= List of accolades received by Chandramukhi (2022 film) =

Chandramukhi awards and nominations
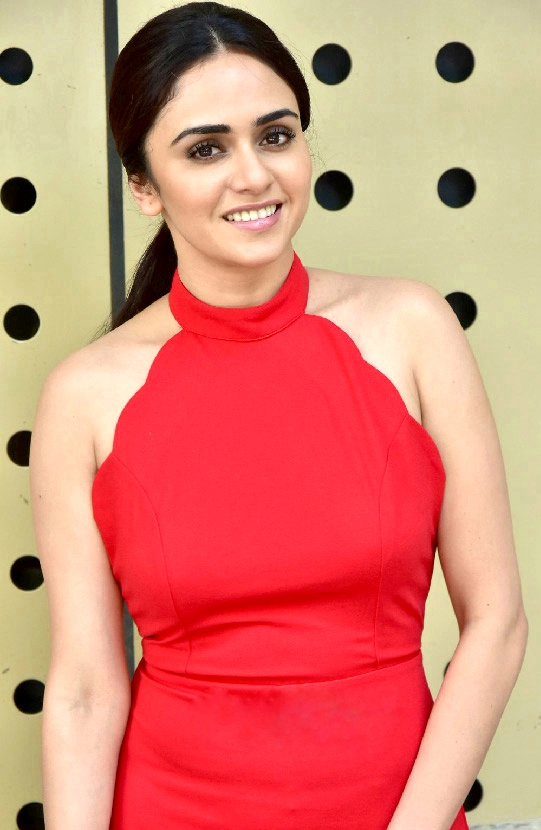
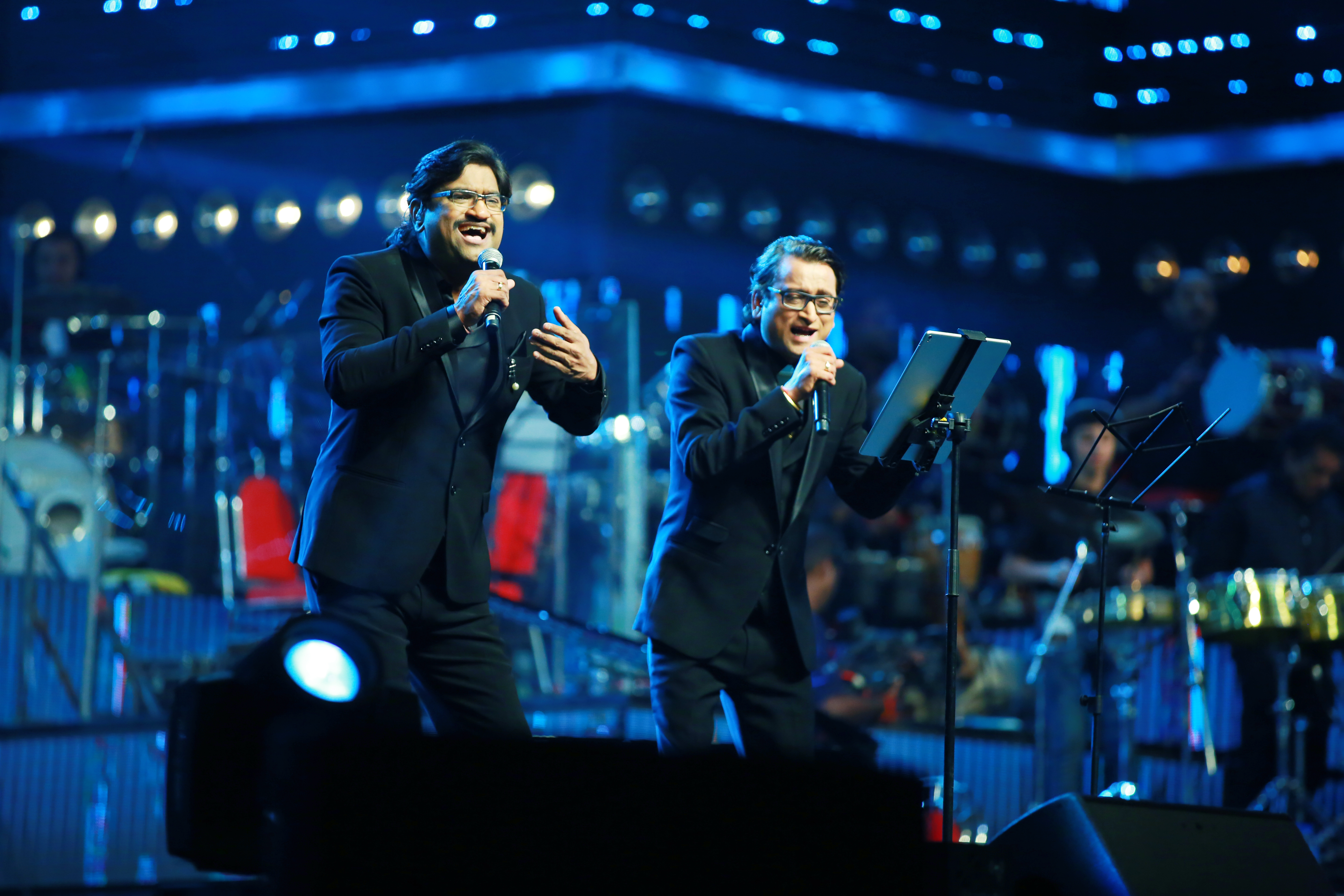
- Amruta Khanvilkar's performance and Ajay-Atul's music, garnered them several awards and nominations respectively.
Awards and nominations
Award	Wins	Nominations
Fakt Marathi Cine Sanman	6	14
Pravah Picture Awards	4	13
Maharashtracha Favourite Kon?	3	7
Lokmat Sakhi Awards	1	1
MATA Sanman	2	8
Zee Chitra Gaurav Puraskar	5	7
Maharashtra Gaurav Sanman	3	3
Filmfare Marathi Awards	3	12
Sakal Premier Awards	1	7
Navarashtra Planet Marathi Film & OTT Awards	9	15
City Cine Awards	1	8
Majja Digital Awards	3	9

Totals (Note: Certain award groups do not simply award one winner. They acknowledge several different recipients, have runners-up, and have third place. Since this is a specific recognition and is different from losing an award, runner-up mentions are considered wins in this award tally. For simplification and to avoid errors, each award in this list has been presumed to have had a prior nomination.)
- Wins: 44
- Nominations: 108

Chandramukhi is a 2022 Indian Marathi-language romantic drama film directed by Prasad Oak. The film stars Amruta Khanvilkar in the title role opposite Adinath Kothare. Mrunmayee Deshpande, Samir Choughule, Rajendra Shisatkar, Mohan Agashe, Surabhi Bhave and Vandana Vaknis appear in supporting roles, while Ashok Shinde, Smita Gondkar and Prajakta Mali make guest appearances in the film. The screenplay and dialogue were written by Chinmay Mandlekar, and it is produced by Akshay Bardapurkar, Piyush Singh, Abhayanand Singh, and Saurabh Gupta under the banners of Planet Marathi, Golden Ratio Films, Flying Dragon Entertainment, and Creative Vibe. The songs were composed by the duo Ajay–Atul, and the lyrics were penned by Guru Thakur. It was edited by Faizal Mahadik and Imran Mahadik, while Sanjay Memane was its cinematographer. Set in 1980s, the film depicts the life story of Tamasha artist who falls in love with a rising politician, and the repercussions that they have to face.

Made on a budget of ₹5 crore (US$520,000), Chandramukhi was released on 29 April 2022, to positive reviews and grossed over ₹24 crore (US$2.5 million) at the box office, becoming a commercial success and one of the highest grossing Marathi films of that year. The film won 41 awards from 104 nominations; the performances of the cast, soundtrack, choreography, and lyrical composition garnered the most attention from various award groups.

Chandramukhi won three awards at the 60th Maharashtra State Film Awards out of four nominations, including Best Actress and Best Supporting Actress. At the 7th Filmfare Awards Marathi, the film received 12 nominations, winning three awards for Best Music Director, Best Playback Singer Female and Best Choreography. It garnered 14 nominations for the Fakt Marathi Cine Sanman and went on to win six awards, including Best Actress, Best Supporting Actress, and Best Actor in a Negative Role. Chandramukhi three awards at Maharashtra Gaurav Sanman 2023 for Best Actress, Best Female Playback Singer and Best Choreography. At Zee Chitra Gaurav Puraskar, it received seven nominations, out of which it won five awards for Best Music Director, Best Playback Singers Female and Best Choreographers. The film also won three awards at the 13th Maharashtracha Favourite Kon? – Favourite Actress, Favourite Song and Favourite Singer – Female.

== Accolades ==
Award	Date of ceremony (Note: Each date is linked to the article about the awards held that year, wherever possible.)	Category	Recipient(s)	Result	Ref.
Fakt Marathi Cine Sanman	27 July 2022	Best Film	Planet Marathi, Golden Ratio Films, Flying Dragon Entertainment, Creative Vibe	Nominated	
Fakt Marathi Cine Sanman	27 July 2022	Best Director	Prasad Oak	Nominated	
Fakt Marathi Cine Sanman	27 July 2022	Best Story	Vishwas Patil	Won	
Fakt Marathi Cine Sanman	27 July 2022	Best Actor in a Lead Role	Adinath Kothare	Nominated	
Fakt Marathi Cine Sanman	27 July 2022	Best Actress in a Lead Role	Amruta Khanvilkar	Won	
Fakt Marathi Cine Sanman	27 July 2022	Best Actress in a Supporting Role	Mrunmayee Deshpande	Won	
Fakt Marathi Cine Sanman	27 July 2022	Best Performance in a Comic Role	Samir Choughule	Nominated	
Fakt Marathi Cine Sanman	27 July 2022	Best Performance in a Negative Role	Rajendra Shisatkar	Won	
Fakt Marathi Cine Sanman	27 July 2022	Best Lyricist	Guru Thakur, Ajay Atul (for song "Bai Ga")	Nominated	
Fakt Marathi Cine Sanman	27 July 2022	Best Playback Singer Female	Shreya Ghoshal (for song "To Chand Rati")	Nominated	
Fakt Marathi Cine Sanman	27 July 2022	Best Playback Singer Female	Aarya Ambekar (for song "Bai Ga")	Won	
Fakt Marathi Cine Sanman	27 July 2022	Best Screenplay	Chinmay Mandlekar	Nominated	
Fakt Marathi Cine Sanman	27 July 2022	Best Dialogue	Chinmay Mandlekar	Nominated	
Fakt Marathi Cine Sanman	27 July 2022	Best Cinematographer	Sanjay Memane	Won	
Pravah Picture Awards	16 September 2022	Best Actress	Amruta Khanvilkar	Nominated	
Pravah Picture Awards	16 September 2022	Best Supporting Actress	Mrunmayee Deshpande	Nominated	
Pravah Picture Awards	16 September 2022	Best Villain	Rajendra Shisatkar	Nominated	
Pravah Picture Awards	16 September 2022	Best Music Director	Ajay Atul (for song "Chandra")	Nominated	
Pravah Picture Awards	16 September 2022	Best Music Director	Ajay Atul (for song "Bai Ga")	Won	
Pravah Picture Awards	16 September 2022	Best Lyricist	Guru Thakur (for song "Bai Ga")	Nominated	
Pravah Picture Awards	16 September 2022	Best Playback Singer – Female	Shreya Ghoshal (for song "Chandra")	Won	
Pravah Picture Awards	16 September 2022	Best Playback Singer – Female	Aarya Ambekar (for song "Bai Ga")	Nominated	
Pravah Picture Awards	16 September 2022	Best Song	Chandra	Nominated	
Pravah Picture Awards	16 September 2022	Best Song	Bai Ga	Won	
Pravah Picture Awards	16 September 2022	Best Cinematography	Sanjay Memane	Nominated	
Pravah Picture Awards	16 September 2022	Best Choreography	Ashish Patil (for song "Bai Ga")	Won	
Pravah Picture Awards	16 September 2022	Best VFX Technician	Golden Square Media Work	Nominated	
Maharashtracha Favourite Kon?	20 January 2023	Favourite Film	Chandramukhi	Nominated	
Maharashtracha Favourite Kon?	20 January 2023	Favourite Director	Prasad Oak	Nominated	
Maharashtracha Favourite Kon?	20 January 2023	Favourite Actor	Adinath Kothare	Nominated	
Maharashtracha Favourite Kon?	20 January 2023	Favourite Actress	Amruta Khanvilkar	Won	
Maharashtracha Favourite Kon?	20 January 2023	Favourite Supporting Actress	Mrunmayee Deshpande	Nominated	
Maharashtracha Favourite Kon?	20 January 2023	Favourite Song	Ajay Atul (for song "Chandra")	Won	
Maharashtracha Favourite Kon?	20 January 2023	Favourite Singer – Female	Shreya Ghoshal (for song "Chandra")	Won	
Lokmat Sakhi Awards	1 February 2023	Best Actor Films	Amruta Khanvilkar	Won	
MATA Sanman	3 March 2023	Best Actress	Amruta Khanvilkar	Nominated	
MATA Sanman	3 March 2023	Best Supporting Actress	Mrunmayee Deshpande	Nominated	
MATA Sanman	3 March 2023	Best Music Director	Ajay Atul	Nominated	
MATA Sanman	3 March 2023	Best Lyricist	Guru Thakur (for song "To Chand Rati")	Nominated	
MATA Sanman	3 March 2023	Best Playback Singer – Female	Shreya Ghoshal (for song "Chandra")	Won	
MATA Sanman	3 March 2023	Best Playback Singer – Female	Aarya Ambekar (for song "Bai Ga")	Nominated	
MATA Sanman	3 March 2023	Best Cinematographer	Sanjay Memane	Won	
MATA Sanman	3 March 2023	Best Art Director	Nilesh Wagh	Nominated	
Zee Chitra Gaurav Puraskar	13 March 2023	Best Actress	Amruta Khanvilkar	Nominated	
Zee Chitra Gaurav Puraskar	13 March 2023	Best Music Director	Ajay Atul	Won	
Zee Chitra Gaurav Puraskar	13 March 2023	Best Playback Singer – Female	Aarya Ambekar (for song "Bai Ga")	Won	
Zee Chitra Gaurav Puraskar	13 March 2023	Best Playback Singer – Female	Shreya Ghoshal (for song "Chandra")	Won	
Zee Chitra Gaurav Puraskar	13 March 2023	Best Lyricist	Guru Thakur	Nominated	
Zee Chitra Gaurav Puraskar	13 March 2023	Best Choreography	Deepali Vichare (for song "Chandra")	Won	
Zee Chitra Gaurav Puraskar	13 March 2023	Best Choreography	Ashish Patil (for song "Bai Ga")	Won	
Maharashtra Gaurav Sanman	26 March 2023	Best Actress	Amruta Khanvilkar	Won	
Maharashtra Gaurav Sanman	26 March 2023	Best Playback Singer	Aarya Ambekar (for song "Bai Ga")	Won	
Maharashtra Gaurav Sanman	26 March 2023	Best Choreography	Ashish Patil (for song "Bai Ga")	Won	
Filmfare Marathi Awards	30 March 2023	Best Film	Chandramukhi	Nominated	
Filmfare Marathi Awards	30 March 2023	Best Director	Prasad Oak	Nominated	
Filmfare Marathi Awards	30 March 2023	Best Actor	Adinath Kothare	Nominated	
Filmfare Marathi Awards	30 March 2023	Best Actress	Amruta Khanvilkar	Nominated	
Filmfare Marathi Awards	30 March 2023	Best Music Director	Ajay-Atul	Won	
Filmfare Marathi Awards	30 March 2023	Best Lyricist	Ajay-Atul, Guru Thakur (for song "Bai Ga")	Nominated	
Filmfare Marathi Awards	30 March 2023	Best Playback Singer – Male	Ajay Gogavale (for song "Kanha")	Nominated	
Filmfare Marathi Awards	30 March 2023	Best Playback Singer – Female	Aarya Ambekar (for song "Bai Ga")	Won	
Filmfare Marathi Awards	30 March 2023	Best Playback Singer – Female	Shreya Ghoshal (for song "Chandra")	Nominated	
Filmfare Marathi Awards	30 March 2023	Best Dialogue	Chinmay Mandlekar	Nominated	
Filmfare Marathi Awards	30 March 2023	Best Choreography	Deepali Vichare (for song "Chandra")	Won	
Filmfare Marathi Awards	30 March 2023	Best Choreography	Ashish Patil (for song "Bai Ga")	Nominated	
Sakal Premier Awards	12 April 2023	Best Actress	Amruta Khanvilkar	Nominated	
Sakal Premier Awards	12 April 2023	Best Supporting Actress	Mrunmayee Deshpande	Nominated	
Sakal Premier Awards	12 April 2023	Best Lyricist	Ajay-Atul, Guru Thakur (for song "Bai Ga")	Nominated	
Sakal Premier Awards	12 April 2023	Best Music Director	Ajay-Atul	Nominated	
Sakal Premier Awards	12 April 2023	Best Playback Singer – Female	Aarya Ambekar (for song "Bai Ga")	Won	
Sakal Premier Awards	12 April 2023	Best Choreography	Deepali Vichare (for song "Chandra")	Nominated	
Sakal Premier Awards	12 April 2023	Best Choreography	Ashish Patil (for song "Bai Ga")	Nominated	
Navarashtra Planet Marathi Film & OTT Awards	5 May 2023	Best Film	Chandramukhi	Nominated	
Navarashtra Planet Marathi Film & OTT Awards	5 May 2023	Best Director	Prasad Oak	Nominated	
Navarashtra Planet Marathi Film & OTT Awards	5 May 2023	Best Actor	Adinath Kothare	Nominated	
Navarashtra Planet Marathi Film & OTT Awards	5 May 2023	Best Actress	Amruta Khanvilkar	Nominated	
Navarashtra Planet Marathi Film & OTT Awards	5 May 2023	Best Supporting Actor (Male)	Sameer Chaughule	Won	
Navarashtra Planet Marathi Film & OTT Awards	5 May 2023	Best Supporting Actor (Female)	Mrunmayee Deshpande	Nominated	
Navarashtra Planet Marathi Film & OTT Awards	5 May 2023	Best Actor in a Negative Role	Rajendra Shisatkar	Won	
Navarashtra Planet Marathi Film & OTT Awards	5 May 2023	Best Lyricist	Ajay-Atul, Guru Thakur (for song "Bai Ga")	Won	
Navarashtra Planet Marathi Film & OTT Awards	5 May 2023	Best Music Director	Ajay-Atul	Won	
Navarashtra Planet Marathi Film & OTT Awards	5 May 2023	Best Singer (Female)	Shreya Ghoshal (for song "Chandra")	Nominated	
Navarashtra Planet Marathi Film & OTT Awards	5 May 2023	Best Singer (Female)	Aarya Ambekar (for song "Bai Ga")	Won	
Navarashtra Planet Marathi Film & OTT Awards	5 May 2023	Best Choreographer	Deepali Vichare (for song "Chandra")	Won	
Navarashtra Planet Marathi Film & OTT Awards	5 May 2023	Best Choreographer	Ashish Patil (for song "Bai Ga")	Won	
Navarashtra Planet Marathi Film & OTT Awards	5 May 2023	Best Screenplay	Chinmay Mandlekar	Won	
Navarashtra Planet Marathi Film & OTT Awards	5 May 2023	Best Makeup	Santosh Gayke	Won	
City Cine Awards	2023	Best Film	Chandramukhi	Nominated	
City Cine Awards	2023	Best Director	Prasad Oak	Nominated	
City Cine Awards	2023	Best Actress	Amruta Khanvilkar	Nominated	
City Cine Awards	2023	Best Lyricist	Guru Thakur (for song "Chandra")	Nominated	
City Cine Awards	2023	Best Music Director	Ajay-Atul	Nominated	
City Cine Awards	2023	Best Singer (Female)	Shreya Ghoshal (for song "Chandra")	Won	
City Cine Awards	2023	Best Singer (Female)	Aarya Ambekar (for song "Bai Ga")	Nominated	
City Cine Awards	2023	Best Screenplay	Chinmay Mandlekar	Nominated	
Majja Digital Awards	17 December 2023	Outstanding Film	Chandramukhi	Nominated	
Majja Digital Awards	17 December 2023	Outstanding Director	Prasad Oak	Nominated	
Majja Digital Awards	17 December 2023	Outstanding Actor In A Lead Role (Female)	Amruta Khanvilkar	Nominated	
Majja Digital Awards	17 December 2023	Outstanding Actor In A Supporting Role (Male)	Samir Choughule	Nominated	
Majja Digital Awards	17 December 2023	Outstanding Music – Lyricist	Guru Thakur (for song "Bai Ga")	Nominated	
Majja Digital Awards	17 December 2023	Outstanding Music – Original Score	Ajay-Atul	Won	
Majja Digital Awards	17 December 2023	Outstanding Music – Male Playback Singer	Ajay Gogavale (for song "Kanha")	Won	
Majja Digital Awards	17 December 2023	Outstanding Music – Female Playback Singer	Shreya Ghoshal (for song "Chandra")	Nominated	
Majja Digital Awards	17 December 2023	Outstanding Music – Female Playback Singer	Aarya Ambekar (for song "Bai Ga")	Won	
Maharashtra State Film Awards	5 August 2025	Best Actress	Amruta Khanvilkar	Won	
Maharashtra State Film Awards	5 August 2025	Best Supporting Actress	Mrunmayee Deshpande	Won	
Maharashtra State Film Awards	5 August 2025	Best Male Playback Singer	Ajay Gogavale (for song "Kanha")	Nominated	
Maharashtra State Film Awards	5 August 2025	Best Female Playback Singer	Aarya Ambekar (for song "Bai Ga")	Won	
