= Fakt Marathi Cine Sanman for Best Story =

Awards for best Story

- Awarded for: Best Performance by a Story Writer
- Country: India
- Presented by: Fakt Marathi
- First award: Vishwas Patil, Chnadramukhi (2022)
- Currently held by: Madhugandha Kulkarni, Paresh Mokashi, Vaalvi (2023)

The Fakt Marathi Cine Sanman for Best Story is given by the Fakt Marathi television network as part of its annual awards for Marathi Cinemas. The winners are selected by the jury members. The award was first given in 2022.

Here is a list of the award winners and the nominees of the respective years.

== Winner and nominees ==
Year	Writer	Film	Ref.
2022	Vishwas Patil	Chandramukhi	
2022	Makarand Mane	Soyrik	
2022	Nikhil Mahajan	June	
2022	Pravin Tarde	Dharmaveer	
2022	Swapnila Gupta, Vishal Furia	Bali	
2023	Madhugandha Kulkarni, Paresh Mokashi	Vaalvi	
2023	Nitin Supekar	Sarla Ek Koti	
2023	Pratap Phad	Ananya	
2023	Shantanu Rode	Goshta Eka Paithanichi	
2023	Nitin Nandan	Baalbhaarti	
2023	Hemant Awtade, Nagraj Manjule	Ghar Banduk Biryani	
