= Filmfare Award for Best Dialogue – Marathi =

Indian award for Marathi language films

Filmfare Marathi Awards for Best Dialogue
- Awarded for: Best Performance by a Dialogue Writer
- Country: India
- Presented by: Filmfare
- First award: Madhugandha Kulkarni, Paresh Mokashi, Elizabeth Ekadashi (2014)
- Website: Filmfare Awards

The Filmfare Marathi Award for Dialogue is given by the Filmfare magazine as part of its annual Filmfare Awards for Marathi films in India, to recognise a writer who wrote a film's dialogue.

== Winner and nominees ==
=== 2010s ===
Year	Recipient(s)	Film
2014	Madhugandha Kulkarni, Paresh Mokashi	Elizabeth Ekadashi
2014	Madhugandha Kulkarni, Sachin Baliram Nagargoje	Taptapadi
2014	Pravin Tarde, Abhijit Panse	Rege
2014	Samruddhi Pore	Dr. Prakash Baba Amte – The Real Hero
2014	Gajendra Ahire	Postcard
2015	Chaitanya Tamhane	Court
2016	Bharat Manjule, Nagraj Manjule	Sairat
2016	Kiran Yadnyopavit, Abhijeet Deshpande	Natsamrat
2016	Rajesh Mapuskar	Ventilator
2016	Dnyanesh Zoting	Half Ticket
2016	Kshitij Patwardhan	YZ
2017	Varun Narvekar	Muramba
2017	Madhugandha Kulkarni, Paresh Mokashi	Chi Va Chi Sau Ka
2017	Makarand Mane	Ringan
2017	Nishant Natharam Dhapse	Halal
2017	Manaswini Lata Ravindra	Ti Saddhya Kay Karte
2017	Sameer Patil	Shentimental

=== 2020s ===
Year	Recipient(s)	Film
2020	Irawati Karnik	Anandi Gopal
2020	Digpal Lanjekar	Fatteshikast
2020	Nitin Supekar	Aatpadi Nights
2020	Upendra Sidhaye	Girlfriend
2020	Sumitra Bhave	Welcome Home
2021	Irawati Karnik	Jhimma
2021	Kshitij Patwardhan	Dhurala
2021	Amar Deokar	Mhorkya
2021	Nikhil Mahajan	June
2021	Prasad Namjoshi	Photo Prem
2021	Shailesh Narwade	Jayanti
2022 (7th)	Pravin Tarde	Dharmaveer
2022 (7th)	Chinmay Mandlekar	Chandramukhi
2022 (7th)	Nipun Dharmadhikari	Me Vasantrao
2022 (7th)	Digpal Lanjekar	Pawankhind
2022 (7th)	Irawati Karnik	Medium Spicy
2022 (7th)	Prajakt Deshmukh	Godavari
2022 (7th)	Shantanu Ganesh Rode	Goshta Eka Paithanichi
2023(8th)	Paresh Mokashi	Aatmapamphlet
2023(8th)	Digpal Lanjekar	Subhedar
2023(8th)	Vaishali Naik	Baipan Bhari Deva
2023(8th)	Makarand Mane, Vitthal Kale	Baaplyok
2023(8th)	Irawati Karnik	Jhimma 2
2024(9th)	Mahesh Manjrekar	Juna Furniture
2024(9th)	Madhugandha Kulkarni, Paresh Mokashi	Nach Ga Ghuma
2024(9th)	Pravin Tarde	Phullwanti
2024(9th)	Aditi Moghe	Sridevi Prasanna
2024(9th)	Chhatrapal Ninawe, Vikas Mudki	Ghaath
2024(9th)	Nitin Dixit	Paani
2025 (10th)	Shivraj Waichal, Omkar Gokhale, Arvind Jagtap	Ata Thambaycha Naay!
2025 (10th)	Guru Thakur	Dashavatar
2025 (10th)	Hemant Dhome	Fussclass Dabhade
2025 (10th)	Jayant Digambar Somalkar	Sthal
2025 (10th)	Rohan Mapuskar, Kunal Pawar	April May 99
2025 (10th)	Santosh Davkhar	Gondhal

== See also ==
- Filmfare Awards Marathi
- Filmfare Awards
- Filmfare Award for Best Screenplay – Marathi
- Filmfare Award for Best Story – Marathi
