= Fakt Marathi Cine Sanman =

Promotional TV awards

- Awarded for: Excellence in the Marathi film industry
- Country: India
- Presented by: Fakt Marathi
- First award: 2022; 4 years ago
- Website: faktmarathitv.com

Television/radio coverage
- Network: Fakt Marathi

Most recent Fakt Marathi Cine Sanman winners
- 2nd Fakt Marathi Cine Sanman
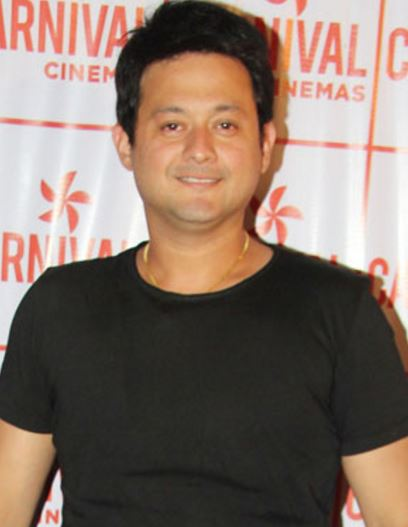

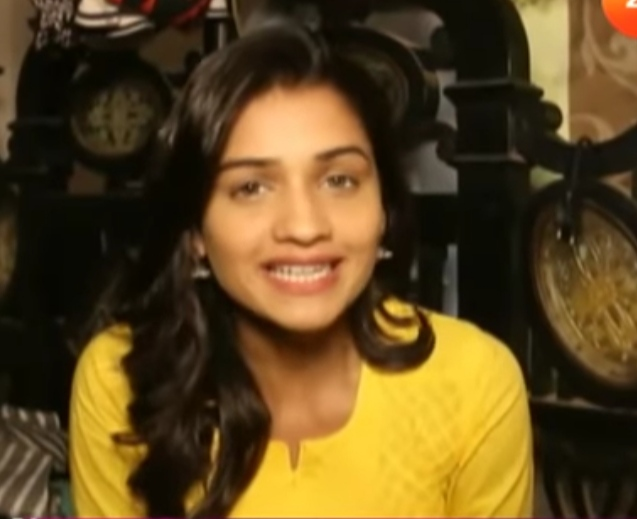

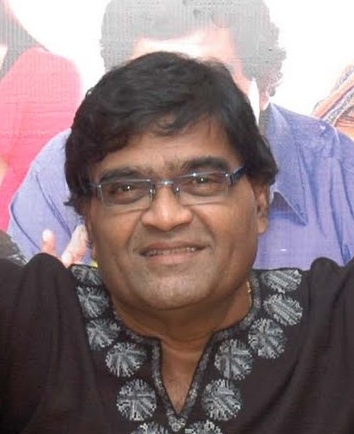
Award	Best Actor in a Lead Role	Best Actress in a Lead Role
Winner	Swapnil Joshi; Vaalvi	Hruta Durgule; Ananya
Award	Best Actor in a Supporting Role	Best Actress in a Supporting Role
Winner	Ashok Saraf; Ved	Kushi Hajare; Ved
Best Film
Vaalvi

The Fakt Marathi Cine Sanman are annual awards presented by the Fakt Marathi television network to honour both artistic and technical excellence in the Marathi-language film industry of India. The Awards were presented for the first time on 27 July 2022, at The Club in Andheri. The members of the jury select the winners. The awards are divided into two categories: popular awards and technical awards. The ceremony is televised on the Marathi television network Fakt Marathi.

== Jury members ==
Year	Members
2022	Vijay Patkar, Sanjay Mone and Satish Kulkarni
2023	Vijay Patkar

== Hosts ==
Year	Hosts
2022	Amey Wagh and Onkar Bhojane
2023	Amey Wagh and Onkar Bhojane

== Award categories ==
=== Popular awards ===
- Best Film
- Best Director
- Best Actor in a Lead Role
- Best Actress in a Lead Role
- Best Actor in a Supporting Role
- Best Actress in a Supporting Role
- Best Performance in a Comic Role
- Best Performance in a Negative Role
- Best Playback Singer Male
- Best Playback Singer Female
- Best Music Director
- Best Lyricist

=== Technical awards ===
- Best Story
- Best Dialogue
- Best Screenplay
- Best Cinematographer

== Fakt Marathi Cine Sanman 2022 ==
The award ceremony was held on 27 July 2022, at The Club in Andheri. The event was hosted by Amey Wagh and Onkar Bhojane and Vidya Balan was the special guest. The event was telecasted on 21 August 2022.

Chandramukhi led the ceremony with 14 nominations, followed by Soyrik and Dharmaveer with 11 nominations each.

Dharmaveer and Chandramukhi won 6 awards each, thus becoming the most-awarded films at the ceremony, with the former winning Best Film, Best Director and Best Actor in a Lead Role, and the latter winning Best Actress in a Lead Role, Best Actress in a Supporting Role and Best Performance in a Negative Role.

Pravin Tarde received five nominations across various categories, winning for Best Director and Best Dialogue, while Makarand Mane received four nominations and won for Best Screenplay.

Anand Shinde and Adarsh Shinde, a father-son duo, both won Best Playback Singer Male awards for different songs.

Best Film	Best Director
Dharmaveer – Zee Studios; Chandramukhi – Planet Marathi, Golden Ratio Films, Flying Dragon Entertainment, Creative Vibe; Jhimma – Chalchitra Company, Crazy Few Films; Sarsenapati Hambirrao – Urvita Productions; Soyrik – 99 Productions, Bahuroopi Productions	Pravin Tarde – Dharmaveer; Aditya Sarpotdar – Zombivli; Dijpal Lanjekar – Pawankhind; Makarand Mane – Soyrik; Prasad Oak – Chandramukhi
Best Actor in a Lead Role	Best Actress in a Lead Role
Prasad Oak – Dharmaveer as Anand Dighe Saheb; Adinath Kothare – Chandramukhi as Daulatrao Deshmane; Pravin Tarde – Sarsenapati Hambirrao as Sarsenapati Hambirrao; Siddharth Menon – June as Neel; Swapnil Joshi – Bali as Shrikant Sathe	Amruta Khanvilkar – Chandramukhi as Chandramukhi (Chandra); Manasi Bhawalkar – Soyrik as Bride Girl; Neha Pendse – June as Neha; Gauri Ingawale – Panghrun as Laxmi; Sai Tamhankar – Pondicherry as Nikita
Best Actor in a Supporting Role	Best Actress in a Supporting Role
Ajay Pukar – Pawankhind as Baji Prabhu Deshpande; Gashmeer Mahajani – Sarsenapati Hambirrao as Chhatrapati Shivaji Maharaj /Chhatrapati Sambhaji Maharaj; Kshitish Date – Dharmaveer as Eknath Shinde; Lalit Prabhakar – Zombivli as Vishwas; Shashank Shende – Soyrik as Police Inspector	Mrunmayee Deshpande – Chandramukhi as Damayanti (Dolly) Deshmane; Chayya Kadam – Soyrik as Police Soldier; Kshitee Jog – Jhimma as Meeta Jahagirdar; Nirmiti Sawant – Jhimma as Nirmala Konde-Patil; Snehal Tarde – Dharmaveer as Anita Birje
Best Performance in a Comic Role	Best Performance in a Negative Role
Siddhartha Jadhav – Locha Zaala Re as Maanav; Bhalchandra Kadam – Pandu as Pandu Hawaldar; Prathamesh Parab – Darling as Tushar; Samir Choughule – Chandramukhi as Battasharao Gangawle; Vandana Gupte – Well Done Baby as Nirmala	Rajendra Sisatkar – Chandramukhi as Nanasaheb Jondhale; Shaurab Gokhale – Adrushya; Mukesh Rishi – Sher Shivraj as Afzalkhan; Pooja Sawant – Bali as Dr. Radhika Shenoy; Sameer Dharmadhikari – Pawankhind as Siddhi Johar
Best Music Director	Best Lyricist
Rahul Deshpande – "Punav Raticha" – Me Vasantrao; Devdutta Manisha Baji – "Yugat Mandli" – Pawankhind; Amitraj – "Jhimma Title Song" – Jhimma; Chinar-Mahesh – "Anand Harpla" – Dharmaveer; Vijay Narayan Gavande – "Kaina" – Soyrik	Mangesh Kangane – "Anand Harpla" – Dharmaveer; Vaibhaiv Deshmukh – "Kaina" – Soyrik; Guru Thakur, Ajay-Atul – "Bai Ga" – Chandramukhi; Kshtij Patwardhan – "Jhimma Title Song" – Jhimma; Vaibhav Joshi – "Punav Raticha" – Me Vasantrao
Best Playback Singer Male	Best Playback Singer Female
Anand Shinde – "Saat Daudale" – Sarsenapati Hambirrao; Adarsh Shinde – "Astami" – Dharmaveer; Avadhoot Gandhi, Haridas Shinde – "Yugat Mandli" – Pawankhind; Rahul Deshpande – "Punav Raticha" – Me Vasantrao; Rahul Deshpande – "Kaivalya Gaan" – Me Vasantrao	Aarya Ambekar – "Bai Ga" – Chandramukhi; Shreya Ghosal – "To Chand Rati" – Chandramukhi; Vaishali Samant, Mugdha Karhade, Aarti Kelkar, Suhas Joshi – "Jhimma Title Song" – Jhimma; Amita Gugari – "Kaina" – Soyrik; Priyanka Barve – "Bindiya Le Gayi" – Me Vasantrao

=== Technical Awards ===
Best Story	Best Dialogue
Vishwas Patil – Chandramukhi; Makarand Mane – Soyrik; Nikhil Mahajan – June; Pravin Tarde – Dharmaveer; Swapnila Gupta, Vishal Furia – Bali	Pravin Tarde – Dharmaveer; Chinmay Mandlekar – Chandramukhi; Ganesh Matkari – Panghrun; Iravati Karnik – Medium Spicy; Makarand Mane – Soyrik
Best Screenplay	Best Cinematographer
Makarand Mane – Soyrik; Chinmay Mandlekar – Chandramukhi; Ganesh Matkari – Panghrun; Pravin Tarde – Dharmaveer; Swapnila Gupta, Vishal Furia – Bali	Sanjay Memane – Chandramukhi; Karan B Ravan – Panghrun; Lawrence Dcunha – Zombivli; Mahesh Limaye – Sarsenapati Hambirrao; Rajan Sohani – Bali

=== Special awards ===
Recipient	Field	Ref
Ajay-Atul	Music Director	
Ashok Saraf	Actor	
Vidyadhar Bhatte	Makeup man	
Sonalee Kulkarni	Vicco Termeric Popular Face of the Year	

== Fakt Marathi Cine Sanman 2023 ==
The nominations were announced on 5 September 2023 and award ceremony was held on 15 September 2023. The event was hosted by Amey Wagh and Onkar Bhojane while Jackie Shroff and Satish Shah were the special guest. The event was telecasted on 28 October 2023.

Best Film	Best Director
Vaalvi; Ananya; Ghar Banduk Biryani; Sarla Ek Koti; Goshta Eka Paithanichi; Ved	Paresh Mokashi – Vaalvi; Hemant Awtade – Ghar Banduk Biryani; Riteish Deshmukh – Ved; Pratap Phad – Ananya; Shantanu Rode – Goshta Eka Paithanichi; Nitin Supekar – Sarla Ek Koti
Best Actor in a Lead Role	Best Actress in a Lead Role
Swapnil Joshi – Vaalvi as Aniket; Riteish Deshmukh – Ved as Satya Jadhav; Amey Wagh – Jaggu Ani Juliet as Jaggu Dada; Onkar Bhojane – Sarla Ek Koti as Bhikaji Vakhre; Nagraj Manjule – Ghar Banduk Biryani as Inspector Raya Patil; Ankush Chaudhari – Autograph – Ek Japun Thevavi Ashi Lovestory as Samar	Hruta Durgule – Ananya as Ananya; Hruta Durgule – Timepass 3 as Pallavi Dinkar Patil; Sayali Sanjeev – Goshta Eka Paithanichi as Indrayani; Genelia Deshmukh – Ved as Shravani Jadhav; Sonalee Kulkarni – Victoria - Ek Rahasya as Ankita; Amruta Khanvilkar – Autograph – Ek Japun Thevavi Ashi Lovestory as Julia
Best Actor in a Supporting Role	Best Actress in a Supporting Role
Ashok Saraf – Ved as Dinkar Jadhav; Vitthal Kale – Ghar Banduk Biryani as George; Suvrat Joshi – Ananya as Dhananjay Deshmukh; Kishor Kadam – BhauBali as Bali Jungam; Paritosh Painter – Aflatoon as Adi; Subodh Bhave – Sahela Re as Vikram	Kushi Hajare – Ved as Kushi; Megha Manjrekar – De Dhakka 2 as Sumati; Umila Kothare – Autograph – Ek Japun Thevavi Ashi Lovestory as Saavni; Chhaya Kadam – Sarla Ek Koti as Bhikaji's mother; Rucha Apte – Ananya as Priyanka Deshpande; Anita Date kelkar – Vaalvi as Avani
Best Performance in a Comic Role	Best Performance in a Negative Role
Sanjay Narvekar – Timepass 3 as Dinkar Patil; Prathmesh Parab – Timepass 3 as Dagdu Shantaram Parab; Siddhartha Jadhav – De Dhakka 2 as Dhanaji Manmode; Parth Bhalerao – Boyz 3 as Dhungraj (Dhungya); Paritosh Painter – Aflatoon as Adi; Namrata Awate Sambherao – Vaalvi as Lady	Upendra Limaye – Chowk; Pravin Tarde – Chowk; Raviraj Kande – Ved as Bhaskar Anna; Yashpal Sarnath – Sarla Ek Koti; Shivani Surve – Vaalvi as Devika; Sayaji Shinde – Ghar Banduk Biryani as Pallam
Best Music Director	Best Lyricist
Ajay-Atul – Maharashtra Shahir; Ajay-Atul – Ved; Amitraj – Ravrambha; A.V. Prafullachandra – Ghar Banduk Biryani; Sameer Saptiskar – Ananya; Vijay Narayan Gavande – Sarla Ek Koti	Ajay-Atul – "Sukh Kalale" – Ved; Jitendra Joshi – "Khal Khal Goda" – Godavari; Guru Thakur – "Gau Nako Kisna" – Maharashtra Shahir; Guru Thakur – "Tuzya Sobatiche" – Phulrani; Vaibhav Deshmukh – "Gun Gun" – Ghar Banduk Biryani; Abhishek Khankar – "Alahida Parawa" – Ananya
Best Playback Singer Male	Best Playback Singer Female
Adarsh Shinde – "Ek Rambha, Ek Raav" – Ravrambha; Vishal Dadlani – "Tu Dhagdhgti Aag" – Ananya; Swapnil Bandodkar – "Tuzya Sobatiche" – Phulrani; Jayesh Khare – "Gau Nako Kisna" – Maharashtra Shahir; Shreyas Puranik – "Kojagiri" – Godavari; Ajay Gogavale – "Ved Tujha" – Ved	Shreya Ghoshal – "Sukh Kalale" – Ved; Anandi Joshi – "Rang Lagala" – Tamasha Live; Shreya Ghoshal – "Baharla Ha Madhumas" – Maharashtra Shahir; Vaishali Mhade – "Gar Gar Bingri" – De Dhakka 2; Aarya Ambekar – "Kevadyacha Paan Tu" – Sarla Ek Koti; Mugda Karhade – "Alahida Parawa" – Ananya

=== Technical Awards ===
Best Story	Best Dialogue
Madhugandha Kulkarni, Paresh Mokashi – Vaalvi; Nitin Supekar – Sarla Ek Koti; Pratap Phad – Ananya; Shantanu Rode – Goshta Eka Paithanichi; Nitin Nandan – Baalbhaarti; Hemant Awtade, Nagraj Manjule – Ghar Banduk Biryani	Hemant Awtade, Nagraj Manjule – Ghar Banduk Biryani; Mrinal Kulkarni – Saheli Re; Pratap Phad – Ananya; Madhugandha Kulkarni, Paresh Mokashi – Vaalvi; Prajakt Deshmukh – Ved; Kalyani Pathare, Aditya Ingle – Butterfly
Best Screenplay	Best Cinematographer
Madhugandha Kulkarni, Paresh Mokashi – Vaalvi; Hemant Awtade, Nagraj Manjule – Ghar Banduk Biryani; Shantanu Rode – Goshta Eka Paithanichi; Pratap Phad – Ananya; Machchindra Bugade, Chandrakant Kanse – Daagadi Chawl 2; Rushikesh Turai, Sandeep Patil, Riteish Deshmukh – Ved	Mahesh Limaye – Jaggu Ani Juliet; Arjun Sarote – Ananya; Sanjay Jadhav – Ravrambha; Vasudeo Rane – Daagadi Chawl 2; Vasudeo Rane – Maharashtra Shahir; Vikram Amladi – Ghar Banduk Biryani

=== Special awards ===
Recipient	Category	Work	Ref
Sanjay Chhabria, Bela Shinde	Best Film Jury	Maharashtra Shahir	
Kedar Shinde	Best Director Jury	Maharashtra Shahir	
Ankush Chaudhari	Best Actor Jury	Maharashtra Shahir	
Genelia Deshmukh	Best Popular Film	Ved	
Genelia Deshmukh	Best Popular Actress	Ved	
Riteish Deshmukh	Best Popular Director	Ved	
Riteish Deshmukh	Best Popular Actor	Ved	
Sachin Pilgaonkar	Contribution to Marathi Cinema	-	
Nikhil Mahajan	69th National Film Awards winner for Best Direction	Godavari	
Saleel Kulkarni, Siddharth Mahadevan, Soumil Shringarpure, Siddharth Khinvasara, Soumendu Kuber, Arundhati Datye, Anoop Nimkar, Nitin Prakash Vaidya	69th National Film Awards winner for Best Feature Film in Marathi	Ekda Kaay Zala	
Ishaan Divecha	69th National Film Awards winner for Best Non-Feature Film Music Direction	Succulent	
Shekhar Bapu Rankhambe	69th National Film Awards winner for Special Jury Award (non-feature film)	Rekha	

== TRP manipulation case ==
A city civil and sessions court granted bail to Shirish Pattanshetty, the owner of the Fakt Marathi channel, in the Television Rating Point (TRP) manipulation case. Pattanshetty maintained his innocence, claiming he never paid any money for rigging rating points. The defense, led by his lawyer, Aniket Nikam, successfully argued for his release.
