= Zee Chitra Gaurav Puraskar for Best Director =

Best director award by Zee Chitra Gaurav Puraskar

- Awarded for: Best Performance by Director
- Country: India
- Presented by: Zee Marathi
- First award: Bipin Nadkarni, Aevdhe Se Aabhaal (2008)
- Currently held by: Shivraj Waichal; Ata Thambaycha Naay! (2026)

The Zee Chitra Gaurav Puraskar for Best Director is chosen by the viewers of Zee Marathi as part of its annual award ceremony for Marathi films, to recognise a director who has delivered an outstanding performance.

== Awards ==
The winners are listed below:

Year	Director(s)	Film
2008	Bipin Nadkarni	Aevdhe Se Aabhaal
2009	Rajiv Patil	Jogwa
2010	Ravi Jadhav	Natarang
2011	Anant Mahadevan	Mee Sindhutai Sapkal
2012	Sujay Dahake	Shala
2013	Ravi Jadhav	Balak-Palak
2014	Abhijeet Panse	Rege
2015	Paresh Mokashi	Elizabeth Ekadashi
2016	Mahesh Manjrekar	Natsamrat
2017	Nagraj Manjule	Sairat
2018	Nachiket Samant	Gachchi
2019	Sudhakar Reddy Yakkanti	Naal
2020	Nitin Supekar	Aatpadi Nights
2021	Not Awarded due to COVID-19	
2022	Nagraj Manjule	Sairat
2023	Nipun Dharmadhikari	Me Vasantrao
2023	Shantanu Rode	Goshta Eka Paithanichi
2023	Nikhil Mahajan	Godavari
2023	Ajit Wadikar	Y
2023	Pratap Phad	Ananya
2023	Riteish Deshmukh	Ved
2024	Makarand Mane	Baaplyok
2024	Aditya Sarpotdar	Unaad
2024	Paresh Mokashi	Vaalvi
2024	Ashish Bende	Aatmapamphlet
2025	Adinath Kothare	Paani
2025	Navjyot Bandiwadekar	Gharat Ganpati
2025	Suhas Desale	Amaltash
2025	Ram Khatmode	Navardev Bsc. Agri
2025	Varun Narvekar	1234
2026	Shivraj Waichal	Ata Thambaycha Naay!
2026	Hrishikesh Gupte	Jarann
2026	Jayant Somalkar	Sthal
2026	Santosh Davakhar	Gondhal
2026	Kshitij Patwardhan	Uttar
