= Fakt Marathi Cine Sanman for Best Dialogue =

Awards for best dialogue

- Awarded for: Best Performance by a Dialogue Writer
- Country: India
- Presented by: Fakt Marathi
- First award: Pravin Tarde, Dharmaveer (2022)
- Currently held by: Hemant Awtade, Nagraj Manjule, Ghar Banduk Biryani (2023)

The Fakt Marathi Cine Sanman for Best Dialogue is given by the Fakt Marathi television network as part of its annual awards for Marathi Cinemas. The winners are selected by the jury members. The award was first given in 2022.

Here is a list of the award winners and the nominees of the respective years.

== Winner and nominees ==
Year	Writer	Film	Ref.
2022	Pravin Tarde	Dharmaveer	
2022	Chinmay Mandlekar	Chandramukhi	
2022	Makarand Mane	Soyrik	
2022	Iravati Karnik	Medium Spicy	
2022	Ganesh Matkari	Panghrun	
2023	Hemant Awtade, Nagraj Manjule	Ghar Banduk Biryani	
2023	Mrinal Kulkarni	Saheli Re	
2023	Madhugandha Kulkarni, Paresh Mokashi	Vaalvi	
2023	Pratap Phad	Ananya	
2023	Prajakt Deshmukh	Ved	
2023	Kalyani Pathare, Aditya Ingle	Butterfly	
