= MFK Award for Favourite Director =

Indian film award

Maharashtracha Favourite Kon? for Best Director
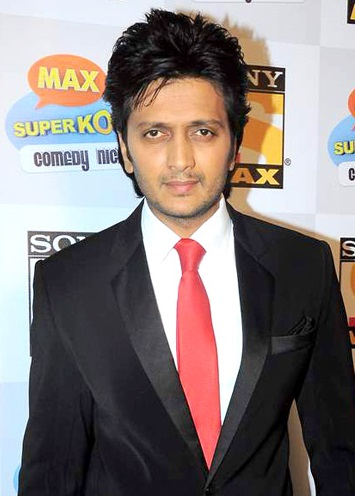
- Awarded for: Best Director
- Country: India
- Presented by: Zee Talkies
- First award: Santosh Manjrekar, Me Shivajiraje Bhosale Boltoy (2010)
- Currently held by: Riteish Deshmukh, Ved (2023)

The Maharashtracha Favourite Kon? Best Director Award is one of the main awards presented by the Zee Talkies each year to recognise directors working in Marathi cinema. Although the awards started in 2009, awards for the Best Director category started in 2010.

== Superlatives ==
Superlatives	Directors	Record
Director with most awards	Mahesh Manjrekar; Sanjay Jadhav; Nagraj Manjule; Pravin Tarde	2
Director with most nominations	Mahesh Manjrekar	8
Director with most nominations	Sanjay Jadhav	7
Director with most nominations without ever winning	Ravi Jadhav	5

== Recipients ==
Year	Photos of winners	Director	Film	Ref.
2010		Santosh Manjrekar	Me Shivajiraje Bhosale Boltoy	
2010		Ravi Jadhav	Natarang	
2010		Mahesh Manjrekar	Shikshanachya Aaicha Gho	
2011		Mahesh Manjrekar	Lalbaug Parel	
2011		Anant Mahadevan	Mee Sindhutai Sapkal	
2011		Ravi Jadhav	Balgandharva	
2011		Sanjay Jadhav	Fakta Ladh Mhana	
2011		Kiran Yadnopavit	Taryanche Bait	
2012		Mahesh Manjrekar	Kaksparsh	
2012		Chandrakant Kulkarni	Tukaram	
2012		Umesh Vinayak Kulkarni	Deool	
2012		Sujay Dahake	Shala	
2012		Avadhoot Gupte	Morya	
2013		Sanjay Jadhav	Duniyadari	
2013		Ravi Jadhav	Balak Palak	
2013		Sachin Pilgaonkar	Ekulti Ek	
2013		Mahesh Kothare	Zapatlela 2	
2013		Mahesh Manjrekar	Kokanastha	
2014		Nishikant Kamat	Lai Bhaari	
2014		Nagraj Manjule	Fandry	
2014		Abhijit Panse	Rege	
2014		Mahesh Limaye	Yellow	
2015		Paresh Mokashi	Elizabeth Ekadashi	
2015		Ravi Jadhav	Timepass 2	
2015		Aditya Sarpotdar	Classmates	
2015		Sanjay Jadhav	Pyaar Vali Love Story	
2015		Avinash Arun	Killa	
2015		Sameer Vidwans	Double Seat	
2016		Nagraj Manjule	Sairat	
2016		Mahesh Manjrekar	Natsamrat	
2016		Subodh Bhave	Katyar Kaljat Ghusali	
2016		Satish Rajwade	Mumbai-Pune-Mumbai 2	
2016		Chandrakant Kanse	Dagadi Chawl	
2016		Sameer Patil	Poshter Girl	
2017		Aditya Sarpotdar	Faster Fene	
2017		Satish Rajwade	Ti Saddhya Kay Karte	
2017		Rajesh Mapuskar	Ventilator	
2017		Paresh Mokashi	Chi Va Chi Sau Ka	
2017		Vishal Devrukhkar	Boyz	
2017		Varun Narvekar	Muramba	
2018		Pravin Tarde	Mulshi Pattern	
2018		Sanjay Jadhav	Ye Re Ye Re Paisa	
2018		Digpal Lanjekar	Farzand	
2018		Sudhakar Reddy Yakkanti	Naal	
2018		Bhaurao Karhade	Baban	
2018		Vishal Devrukhkar	Boyz 2	
2019		Sanjay Jadhav	Khari Biscuit	
2019		Prasad Oak	Hirkani	
2019		Digpal Lanjekar	Fatteshikast	
2019		Hemant Dhome	Ye Re Ye Re Paisa 2	
2019		Sameer Vidhwans	Anandi Gopal	
2019		Milind Kavde	Takatak	
2021		Nagraj Manjule	Sairat	
2021		Santosh Manjrekar	Me Shivajiraje Bhosale Boltoy	
2021		Mahesh Manjrekar	Lalbaug Parel	
2021		Mahesh Manjrekar	Kaksparsh	
2021		Sanjay Jadhav	Duniyadari	
2021		Sanjay Jadhav	Khari Biscuit	
2021		Nishikant Kamat	Lai Bhaari	
2021		Paresh Mokashi	Elizabeth Ekadashi	
2021		Aditya Sarpotdar	Faster Fene	
2021		Pravin Tarde	Mulshi Pattern	
2022		Pravin Tarde	Dharmaveer	
2022		Prasad Oak	Chandramukhi	
2022		Ravi Jadhav	Timepass 3	
2022		Viju Mane	Pandu	
2022		Digpal Lanjekar	Sher Shivraj	
2022		Aditya Sarpotdar	Zombivli	
2022		Mahesh Manjrekar, Sudesh Manjrekar	De Dhakka 2	
2022		Abhijit Deshpande	Har Har Mahadev	
2023		Riteish Deshmukh	Ved	
2023		Kedar Shinde	Baipan Bhaari Deva	
2023		Kedar Shinde	Maharashtra Shahir	
2023		Digpal Lanjekar	Subhedar	
2023		Paresh Mokashi	Vaalvi	
2023		Sudhakar Reddy Yakkanti	Naal 2	
2023		Hemant Dhome	Jhimma 2	
2023		Hemant Jangal Awtade	Ghar Banduk Biryani	
