= Fakt Marathi Cine Sanman for Best Actor in a Supporting Role =

Awards for best supporting actor

- Awarded for: Actor in a Supporting Role
- Country: India
- Presented by: Fakt Marathi
- First award: Ajay Purkar, Pawankhind (2022)
- Currently held by: Ashok Saraf, Ved (2023)

The Fakt Marathi Cine Sanman for Actor in a Supporting Role is given by the Fakt Marathi television network as part of its annual awards for Marathi Cinemas. The winners are selected by the jury members. The award was first given in 2022.

Here is a list of the award winners and the nominees of the respective years.

== Winner and nominees ==
Year	Photos of winners	Actor	Roles(s)	Film	Ref.
2022		Ajay Purkar	Baji Prabhu Deshpande	Pawankhind	
2022		Gashmeer Mahajani	Chhatrapati Shivaji Maharaj / Chhatrapati Sambhaji Maharaj	Sarsenapati Hambirrao	
2022		Kshitish Date	Eknath Shinde	Dharmaveer	
2022		Lalit Prabhakar	Vishwas	Zombivli	
2022		Shashank Shende	Police Inspector	Soyrik	
2023		Ashok Saraf	Dinkar Jadhav	Ved	
2023		Vitthal Kale	George	Ghar Banduk Biryani	
2023		Suvrat Joshi	Dhananjay Deshmukh	Ananya	
2023		Kishor Kadam	Bali Jungam	BhauBali	
2023		Paritosh Painter	Adi	Aflatoon	
2023		Subodh Bhave	Vikram	Sahela Re	
