= Mu. Po. Bombilwaadi =

2025 film by Paresh Mokashi

- Theatrical release poster
- Directed by: Paresh Mokashi
- Written by: Paresh Mokashi
- Produced by: Madhugandha Kulkarni; Bharatt Dilip Shitole
- Starring: Prashant Damle; Anand Ingle; Manmit Pem; Vaibhav Mangle; Geetanjali Kulkarni; Pranav Raorane; Ritika Shrotri
- Cinematography: Satyajeet Shobha Shriram
- Edited by: Abhijeet Deshpande
- Music by: Tanmay Bhide
- Production companies: Vivek Films; Mayasabha Karamanuk Mandali
- Release date: 1 January 2025
- Running time: 140 minutes
- Country: India
- Language: Marathi

Mu. Po. Bombilwaadi, short for Mukkam Post Bombilwaadi, (transl. Address: Post Bombilwaadi) is a 2025 Indian Marathi-language comedy-drama film written and directed by Paresh Mokashi. Produced by Madhugandha Kulkarni and Bharatt Dilip Shitole under the banners of Vivek Films and Mayasabha Karamanuk Mandali, the film features an ensemble cast including Prashant Damle, Anand Ingale, Manmeet Pem, Pranav Raorane, Vaibhav Mangle, Ritika Shrotri and Geetanjali Kulkarni. Set in 1942, the story unfolds in a tranquil Indian village thrown into uproar with the unexpected arrival of Hitler. Amid the chaos of World War II, the villagers, led by their spirited local theater group, unite to take on the dictator in a hilarious and heartwarming battle for freedom.

The film was officially announced in September 2024. The film was originally announced as a Christmas 2024 release, but it was postponed and theatrically released on 1 January 2025. Mu. Po. Bombilwaadi won National Film Award for Best Marathi Feature Film at the 72nd National Film Awards.

== Cast ==
- Prashant Damle as Adolf Hitler
- Anand Ingale as Winston Churchill
- Manmeet Pem as Babban
- Pranav Raorane as Bhaskar
- Vaibhav Mangle as Varvante
- Geetanjali Kulkarni as Varvante Kaku
- Adwait Dadarkar as police inspector Cook
- Ganesh Mayekar as Bhairav
- Sunil Abhyankar as Vaidya Buwa
- Ritika Shrotri as Kundalini
- Deepti Lele as Eva Brown
- Rajesh Mapuskar as Geobbels

== Production ==
Mu. Po. Bombilwaadi was announced in September 2024 with the title "Mu. Po. Bombilwaadi—1942 Eka Bombchi Bomb" and a release date of 25 December 2024. The film is a film adaptation of a theater play. While the cast of the film was announced on 21 September 2024, Prashant Damle's role as Hitler was revealed later, on 16 October 2024, with a special post showcasing his character. Speaking about the casting of Hitler, director Mokashi explained that the decision was influenced by the film's farcical tone, which called for a "cute" portrayal of the dictator. Damle, widely recognized as a "cute" figure in Maharashtra, was the perfect choice. He further noted that the adaptation process reimagined characters to fit the story and actors, leading to a well-suited and brilliant cast. Actress Geetanjali Kulkarni and actor Vaibhav Mangle, who were part of the original play, also play important roles in the film. Damle even trimmed his mustache after 35 years to suit the character.

== Soundtrack ==
Track listing
No.	Title	Lyrics	Music	Singer(s)	Length
1.	"Mukkam Post Bombilwaadi – Title track"	Paresh Mokashi	Tanmay Bhide	Avadhoot Gupte, Vaibhav Mangle	3:46
Total length:					3:46

== Release ==
On 14 November 2024, the title track was released, making it copyright-free calling it "Ladki Janata Yojana" for the audience to help build excitement for the film. The teaser of the film was released on 1 December at PVR Cinemas in Juhu, Mumbai, where entire team was present. Within a week, on 16 December, the trailer was also released.

== Reception ==
Mukkam Post Bombilwaadi received mixed reviews from critics, with praise for its performances and premise but criticism for its execution and failure to fully adapt the theatrical play into a cinematic experience. Ganesh Matkari of The Hollywood Reporter described the film as "entertaining and well-acted" but noted that it "lacks rhythm and cinematic vision," feeling underwhelming despite its strong premise. Sandesh Vahane, writing for Sakal, expressed disappointment, stating that the film failed to meet audience expectations and lacked the spark of Paresh Mokashi's earlier works. Milind Bhanage of The Times of India gave the film a 3/5 rating, calling it "a theatrical farce that's hilarious only in parts" and criticizing its stage-like execution despite a talented cast. Nandini Ramnath of Scroll.in labeled the film "extremely silly and occasionally funny," highlighting Prashant Damle's performance as Hitler but noting that the film remained too theatrical and lacked ambition. Kalpesh Kubal of Maharashtra Times also reviewed the film, describing its comedic elements but echoing sentiments about its limited cinematic appeal.

== Awards ==
- National Film Award for Best Marathi Feature Film at the 72nd National Film Awards in 2026
