= Fakt Marathi Cine Sanman for Best Performance in a Negative Role =

Awards for best actor in a negative role

Fakt Marathi Cine Sanman for Best Actor in a Negative Role
- Awarded for: Best Performance in a Negative Role
- Country: India
- Presented by: Fakt Marathi
- First award: Rajendra Sisatkar, Chandramukhi (2022)
- Currently held by: Upendra Limaye, Cowk (2023)

The Fakt Marathi Cine Sanman for Actor in a Negative Role is given by the Fakt Marathi television network as part of its annual awards for Marathi Cinemas. The winners are selected by the jury members. The award was first given in 2022.

Here is a list of the award winners and the nominees of the respective years.

== Winner and nominees ==
Year	Photos of winners	Actor	Roles(s)	Film	Ref.
2022		Rajendra Sisatkar	Nanasaheb Jondhale	Chandramukhi	
2022		Shaurab Gokhale		Adrushya	
2022		Mukesh Rishi	Afzalkhan	Sher Shivraj	
2022		Pooja Sawant	Dr. Radhika Shenoy	Bali	
2022		Sameer Dharmadhikari	Siddhi Johar	Pawankhind	
2023		Upendra Limaye	Tiger	Chowk	
2023		Pravin Tarde		Chowk	
2023		Raviraj Kande	Bhaskar Anna	Ved	
2023		Yashpal Sarnath		Sarla Ek Koti	
2023		Shivani Surve	Devika	Vaalvi	
2023		Sayaji Shinde	Pallam	Ghar Banduk Biryani	
