= Sarsenapati Hambirrao =

- Directed by: Pravin Tarde
- Written by: Pravin Tarde
- Produced by: Sandeep Mohite Patil; Saujanya Nikam; Darmendra Bora
- Starring: Pravin Tarde; Gashmeer Mahajani; Snehal Tarde; Mohan Joshi
- Cinematography: Mahesh Limaye
- Music by: Narendra Bhide; Avinash-Vishwajeet
- Production company: Urvita Productions
- Distributed by: AA Films
- Release date: 27 May 2022
- Running time: 158 minutes
- Country: India
- Language: Marathi
- Box office: ₹17 crore

Sarsenapati Hambirrao is an Indian Marathi-language historical war film written and directed by Pravin Tarde and produced by Sandeep Mohite Patil, Saujanya Nikam and Darmendra Bora under Urvita Productions. The film stars Pravin Tarde, Gashmeer Mahajani, and Mohan Joshi in lead roles, and is based on the life of Hambirrao Mohite, a military commander of the Maratha Empire. It was released worldwide on 27 May 2022.

== Cast ==
- Pravin Tarde as Sarsenapati Hambirrao
- Gashmeer Mahajani as Shivaji I and Chhatrapati Sambhaji
- Snehal Tarde as Laxmibai Mohite
- Shruti Marathe as Maharani Soyarabai
- Raqesh Bapat as Sarjhah Khan
- Mohan Joshi as Aurangzeb Alamgir
- Upendra Limaye as Bahirji Naik
- Amit Jadhav as Portuguese Viceroy - Francisco de Távora
- Ramesh Pardeshi as Yesaji Kank
- Sunil Abhyankar as Annaji Pant
- Arya Ramesh Pardesi as Tararani
- Rewati Limaye as Yesubai Bhonsale
- Sunil Palwal as Bahadur Khan

== Reception ==
Mihir Bhanage of The Times of India gave the film 3 out of five stars, saying "Gashmeer Mahajani and Praveen Tarde star on screen in this landmark film".

== Awards and nominations ==
=== Fakt Marathi Cine Sanman ===
Won

- Best Playback Singer Male – Anand Shinde – "Saat Daudale"

Nominated

- Best Film – Urvita Productions
- Best Actor in a Lead Role – Pravin Tarde
- Best Actor in a Supporting Role – Gashmeer Mahajani
- Best Cinematographer – Mahesh Limaye

=== 7th Filmfare Awards Marathi ===
Winner

- Filmfare Award for Best Cinematographer – Marathi - Mahesh Limaye

Nominated

- Filmfare Award for Best Costume Design – Marathi - Manasi Attarde
- Filmfare Award for Best Art Direction – Marathi - Madan Mane
- Filmfare Award for Best Supporting Actor – Marathi - Gashmeer Mahajani
- Filmfare Award for Best Director – Marathi - Pravin Tarde
- Filmfare Award for Best Film – Marathi - Urvita Productions
