= Nach Ga Ghuma =

- Theatrical release poster
- Marathi: नाच गं घुमा
- Directed by: Paresh Mokashi
- Written by: Madhugandha Kulkarni; Paresh Mokashi
- Produced by: Madhugandha Kulkarni; Paresh Mokashi; Swapnil Joshi; Sharmishtha Raut; Tejas Desai; Trupti Patil
- Starring: Mukta Barve; Namrata Sambherao; Sarang Sathaye
- Cinematography: Sandeep GN Yadav
- Edited by: Faisal Mahadik
- Music by: Tanmay Bhide
- Production company: Hiranyagarbha Manoranjan
- Distributed by: Panorama Studios
- Release date: 1 May 2024
- Running time: 139 minutes
- Country: India
- Language: Marathi
- Box office: ₹27 crore (US$2.8 million)

Nach Ga Ghuma (transl. Dance, dear woman) is a 2024 Indian Marathi-language drama film co-written and directed by Paresh Mokashi and produced by Swapnil Joshi under the banner of Hiranyagarbha Manoranjan. The film features Mukta Barve, Namrata Sambherao, Sarang Sathaye in the lead roles and Sukanya Mone, Supriya Pathare, Madhugandha Kulkarni, Sunil Abhyankar, and Sharmishtha Raut in other pivotal roles. The film traces the dynamic between the homeowner and their domestic assistant, portraying their humorous and sometimes tumultuous relationship.

The film was released on 1 May 2024 to positive reviews and become the highest grossing Marathi film of the year.

It was remade in Gujarati as Maharani, directed by Viral Shah.

== Plot ==
The story centres on the turbulent relationship between Rani (Mukta Barve), a bank employee, and her domestic help, Asha (Namrata Sambherao).

Asha is habitually late for work and spends much of her time on the phone, which frequently frustrates Rani. Alongside her job at the bank, Rani is also part of an inter-bank yoga team with her colleague Kalyani (Sharmishtha Raut). One day, when Asha fails to arrive on time, Rani loses patience and dismisses her. After some time, however, Rani rehires her.

On another occasion, Rani asks Asha to come early so that she can leave for the yoga competition. Asha arrives late again, causing delays that force Rani's husband to drive hurriedly, leading to an accident. At this point, Rani once more removes Asha from her household.

Meanwhile, Rani and Kalyani progress to the final round of the yoga contest. Just before the event, Kalyani fractures her leg and is unable to perform. The organisers permit a substitute, and Rani realises that Asha is the only suitable replacement. The situation leaves the question of whether Asha will agree to step in and whether Rani will take her back into her service.

== Cast ==
- Mukta Barve as Rani
- Namrata Sambherao as Asha
- Sarang Sathaye as Anand (Gotya): Rani's husband
- Myra Vaikul as Sayali (Chikoo): Rani and Anand's daughter
- Sukanya Kulkarni as Rani's mother
- Supriya Pathare as Anand's mother
- Sunil Abhyankar as Rani's employer
- Sharmishtha Raut as Kalyani: Rani's colleague
- Madhugandha Kulkarni as Vandana: Rani's colleague
- Asha Dnyate as Rani's colleague
- Swapnil Joshi as himself (special appearance)
- Kavita Lad as herself (special appearance)
- Lalit Prabhakar as himself (special appearance)
- Prajakta Mali as herself (special appearance)

== Production ==
=== Development ===
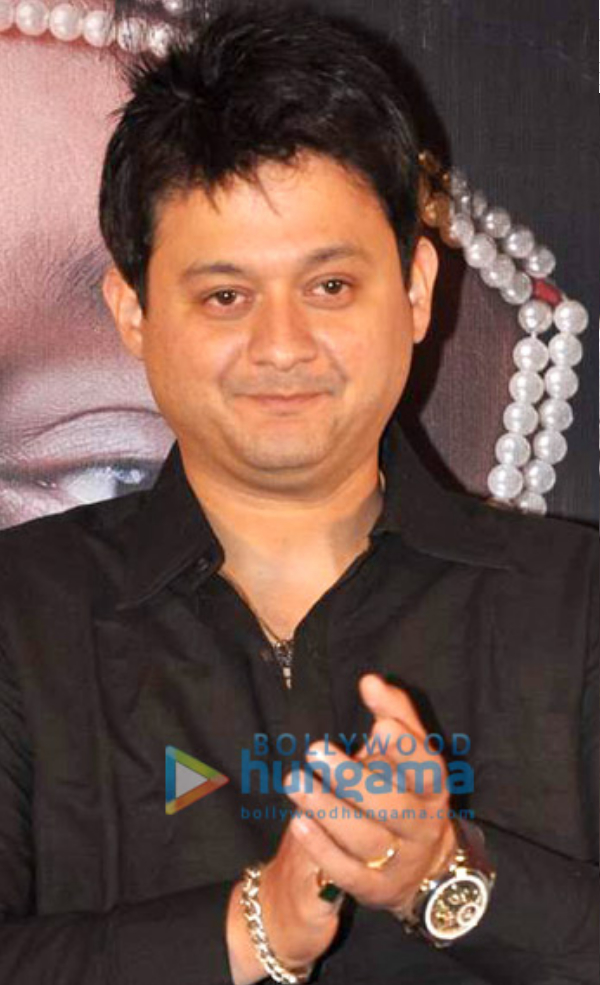
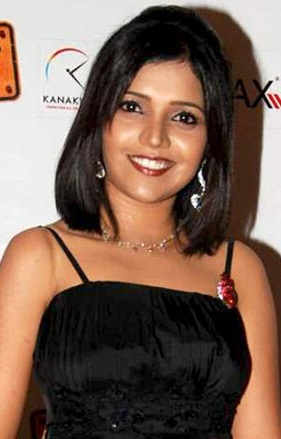
Swapnil Joshi (L), who turned producer, made a guest appearance in the film, starring Mukta Barve in the lead role.

The film's The film was officially announced on 15 October 2023, and Muhurta took place on 15 January 2024, coinciding with Makar Sankranti, in the presence of key actors, producers, and crew members. The first motion poster was revealed on International Women's Day 2024. It is a first Marathi film of Swapnil Joshi as a producer collaborated with Paresh Mokashi and Madhugandha Kulkarni, previously they have worked in Vaalvi together. Mokashi expressed that the screenplay effectively integrates clever and everyday occurrences to provide entertainment, while respecting the dignity of women. He further mentioned, "We've intricately incorporated numerous subtle details pertaining to women in the script, ensuring the nuanced essence of womanhood is portrayed uniquely."

=== Casting ===
Mokashi mentioned that casting discussions commenced after completing the scripting phase. Actresses Mukta Barve and Namrata Sambherao were chosen in pivotal roles. Namrata Sambherao expressing confidence in their portrayal of the significance of housemaids. Alongside them, Sukanya Mone, Supriya Pathare, Sharmishtha Raut, Madhugandha Kulkarni, Asha Gopal, and Sarang Sathe also feature prominently.

=== Filming ===
Principal photography was begun on 15 January 2024.

== Soundtrack ==
Nach Ga Ghuma

Soundtrack album by Tanmay Bhide
- Released: 2024
- Genre: Feature film soundtrack
- Length: 11:42
- Language: Marathi
- Label: Everest Marathi

Official audio
- Nach Ga Ghuma - Full Album on YouTube

All lyrics are written by Paresh Mokashi; all music is composed by Tanmay Bhide.

Track listing
No.	Title	Singer (s)	Length
1.	"Nach Ga Ghuma"	Vaishali Samant, Avadhoot Gupte	3:25
2.	"Gadbadgeet"	Rajeshwari Pawar, Jaydeep Vaidya	4:36
3.	"Bhatukli Geet"	Nandesh Umap	3:22
Total length:			11:42

== Marketing ==
The two-minute and thirty-second trailer was released in April 2024 and showcased at Pune Patrakar Parishad.

== Release ==
=== Theatrical ===
The film was theatrically released on 1 May 2024, coinciding Maharashtra Day. The film garnered a positive response in pre-booking, with a record 20,000 tickets booked before the show began. Notably, reservations on Book My Show were made even before the official booking period started. The film's bookings are generating a tremendous response across Mumbai, Pune, Thane, Navi Mumbai, as well as Nashik, Nagpur, and Pimpri-Chinchwad.

=== Home media ===
The is available for streaming on Prime Video.

== Reception ==
=== Critical reception ===
Santosh Bhingarde of Sakal awarded 3.5/5 and praised the direction, acting, music, and cinematography. He appreciate the seamless incorporation of casual and verbal humor throughout the movie. However, he also observed that some scenes feel exaggerated, though they acknowledge that it adds to the comedic aspect of the film. Kalpeshraj Kubal of The Times of India rated 3.0/5 and wrote "It's straightforward and simple story that is completely predictable." Writing for Scroll.in Nandini Ramnath seems to be critiquing the film for its portrayal of urban life and workplace dynamics, particularly focusing on the characters Rani and Asha. Ramnath praises the performances of Mukta Barve and Namrata Sambherao for adding depth to their characters but ultimately suggests that the film may not leave a lasting impact. Reshma Raikwar of Loksatta praised the film for its portrayal of the emotional world of a woman without getting stuck in overly dramatic scenarios. She appreciated the spontaneity of every character and how no one is portrayed as deliberately evil, but rather as displaying different aspects of human nature beautifully.

=== Box office ===
The film collected ₹2.13 crore (US$220,000) on its opening day making it the third highest opener in Marathi cinema. The film was grossed over ₹7.80 crore (US$810,000) in five days of release. Nach Ga Ghuma earned ₹14.05 crore (US$1.5 million) net collection at the box office in the second weekend. In the third weekend the net collection stands at ₹19.40 crore (US$2.0 million). The film collected ₹19.63 crore (US$2.0 million) on 24th day and netted ₹21.68 crore (US$2.3 million) in the third week. The film grossed ₹27 crore (US$2.8 million) in its final theatrical run.

=== Accolades ===
Year	Award	Category	Nominee (s)	Result	Ref.
2024	Aaryans Sanman	Best Actress	Mukta Barve	Nominated	
2024	Aaryans Sanman	Promising Actor / Actress	Namrata Sambherao	Won	
2024	City Cine Awards	Best Film	Nach Ga Ghuma	Nominated	
2024	City Cine Awards	Best Director	Paresh Mokashi	Nominated	
2024	City Cine Awards	Best Actress	Mukta Barve	Nominated	
2024	City Cine Awards	Best Screenplay	Paresh Mokashi and Madhugandha Kulkarni	Nominated	
2024	City Cine Awards	King of Entertainment	Namrata Sambherao	Won	
2025	Zee Chitra Gaurav Puraskar	Best Actress	Mukta Barve	Nominated	
2025	Zee Chitra Gaurav Puraskar	Best Child Actor	Myra Vaikul	Won	
2025	Zee Chitra Gaurav Puraskar	Best Actress in a Comic Role	Namrata Sambherao	Won	
2025	Zee Chitra Gaurav Puraskar	Best Actress in a Comic Role	Sukanya Kulkarni	Nominated	
2025	Zee Chitra Gaurav Puraskar	Best Actress in a Comic Role	Supriya Pathare	Nominated	
2025	Zee Chitra Gaurav Puraskar	Best Editing	Faisal Mahadik	Nominated	
2025	Zee Chitra Gaurav Puraskar	Best Dialogue	Paresh Mokashi and Madhugandha Kulkarni	Nominated	
2025	NDTV Marathi Entertainment Awards	Best Film	Nach Ga Ghuma	Nominated	
2025	NDTV Marathi Entertainment Awards	Best Director	Paresh Mokashi	Nominated	
2025	NDTV Marathi Entertainment Awards	Best Actress in a Lead Role	Mukta Barve	Nominated	
2025	NDTV Marathi Entertainment Awards	Best Actress in a Supporting Role	Namrata Sambherao	Won	
2025	NDTV Marathi Entertainment Awards	Best Music Album	Sanket Sane	Won	
2025	NDTV Marathi Entertainment Awards	Best Screenplay	Paresh Mokashi and Madhugandha Kulkarni	Won	
2025	Ma Ta Sanman	Best Supporting Actor	Sarang Sathaye	Nominated	
2025	Ma Ta Sanman	Best Supporting Actress	Namrata Sambherao	Won	
2025	Zee24Taas Marathi Sanman	Best Actor in Comedy	Namrata Sambherao	Won	
2026	Maharashtra State Film Awards	Best Film III	Nach Ga Ghuma	Won	
2026	Maharashtra State Film Awards	Best Director III	Paresh Mokashi	Won	
2026	Maharashtra State Film Awards	Best Supporting Actress	Namrata Sambherao	Won	
