= Vaalvi =

- Theatrical release poster
- Marathi: वाळवी
- Directed by: Paresh Mokashi
- Written by: Madhugandha Kulkarni; Paresh Mokashi
- Produced by: Madhugandha Kulkarni
- Starring: Swapnil Joshi; Anita Date Kelkar; Subodh Bhave; Shivani Surve
- Cinematography: Satyajit Shobha Shriram
- Edited by: Abhijeet Deshpande; Saurabh Prabhudesai
- Music by: Mangesh Dhakade
- Production companies: Zee Studios; Mayasabha Karamanuk Mandali
- Distributed by: Zee Studios
- Release date: 13 January 2023
- Running time: 106 minutes
- Country: India
- Language: Marathi
- Box office: est. ₹7.25 crore

Vaalvi (translation: Termites) is a 2023 Indian Marathi-language dark comedy thriller film directed by Paresh Mokashi and produced by Madhugandha Kulkarni under the production banner of Zee Studios. The film stars Swapnil Joshi, Anita Date Kelkar, Subodh Bhave and Shivani Surve and was released theatrically on 13 January 2023 and digitally on ZEE5 on 24 February 2023. In the film, Aniket (Joshi) plans to murder his mentally unstable wife, Avani (Date Kelkar), by faking a double suicide along with his girlfriend, Devika (Surve), but unforeseen circumstances compel them to team up with a psychiatrist, Anshuman (Bhave).

Vaalvi was a major critical and commercial success, it earned over ₹7.25 crore at the Box office and emerging as the year's Sixth highest grossing Marathi film. Vaalvi won the National Film Award for Best Feature Film in Marathi at 70th National Film Awards.

== Plot ==
Aniket, an unhappily married man, plots a vile scheme with his dentist girlfriend Devika to dispose of Avani, his wife of 14 years who has severe mental disorder and threatens to resort to legal means if he ever tries to divorce her, and frame it as a suicide. The main plan involves Aniket lying to Avani about his company's bankruptcy and a possible repossession of their house by debt collectors in order to convince her to make a suicide pact with him. Oblivious to her, Aniket's gun is empty and once Avani shoots herself, Aniket will consume his suicide note, which states that the decision was made of free will. With her death being proven a suicide, Aniket will go scot free and move into a new apartment with Devika. The two go through the plan at her clinic to ensure the plan does not fall through.

After pasting a foreclosure notice on the door, he finds Avani sleeping on the floor, a side effect of the anti-depressants she takes. She has been fostering termites for microbiology experiments, supposedly trying to train them to eat plastic "like the ones in Germany". After Avani expresses her desire to commit suicide that day itself, they settle on writing their notes instead.

The next day, having lied to Avani that he wants to visit his office one last time, Aniket files an FIR for his apparently missing gun, only for him to find out that a crime branch officer must accompany him during the investigation; luckily, there is no officer available at the moment. He then goes to Devika's clinic under the ruse of a scheduled root canal appointment, takes on the guise of a delivery driver (which he can say he wore to throw debt collectors off his trail) and leaves for his house. When Avani does not answer the door, Aniket enters to find her lying on the floor, presumably sleeping after taking her medication. Aniket decides to shoot her himself, planting the gun, a bottle of anti-depressants and her note as evidence.

Aniket goes back home, planning to feign shock at his wife's apparent suicide. However, her corpse and suicide note have mysteriously vanished, prompting Aniket to summon Devika to the scene. They scout the house for clues, finding a positive pregnancy test in the bathroom. A mysterious person calls Aniket, telling him he knows what they did and asks them to meet him at a given location as soon as possible.

Aniket and Devika are perplexed to find that the caller was Dr. Anshuman, Avani's psychiatrist, who somehow has Avani's corpse and suicide note with him. He explains that he had an intimate relationship with Avani during her psychiatric evaluation. After Aniket left the house earlier that day, Avani called Anshuman to inform him that she is pregnant with his baby. Realizing that this could put his reputation in jeopardy, Anshuman immediately visits Avani, later administering her a fatal overdose of anti-depressants. Aniket's arrival prompted Anshuman to hide in a nearby bathroom from where he witnessed the shooting.

As the body sets into rigor mortis, the trio try to find a place to bury it, nearly getting caught by the police and a group of campers. While driving, they come across a car accident, with the police inspector present at the site asking them to drop a woman with minor injuries off to a nearby hospital. The woman realizes that Avani is dead and tries to alert the inspector. In the ensuing scuffle, Aniket strikes her with a steel bottle, killing her instantaneously. On finding the dead bodies in the car, the inspector pulls his gun on Anshuman and Aniket, but is shot dead by Devika before he can take any action.

Realizing it is dawn, Devika, Anshuman and Aniket decide to drive back to Aniket's house and store the bodies there, planning to go back at night to find a place to bury them. Shortly after they have placed the bodies on a couch, a falling chandelier crushes all three of them. As the police investigate the scene, the final shot shows some termites gnawing on a nylon rope.

== Cast ==
- Swapnil Joshi as Aniket
- Anita Date-Kelkar as Avani
- Subodh Bhave as Dr. Anshuman
- Shivani Surve as Dr. Devika
- Namrata Sambherao as Injured woman in clinic and car
- Sandy as Investigating police inspector
- Asha Dnyate as Radhabai (Aniket and Avani's domestic worker)

== Release ==
=== Theatrical ===
The trailer was released on YouTube on 4 January 2023 and the film was theatrically released on 13 January 2023.

=== Home media ===
The film was digitally released on ZEE5 on 24 February 2023.

== Reception ==
=== Critical reception ===
The film received positive reviews from critics. A Reviewer of Scroll.in wrote "The pitch-perfect cast has just the right attitude to a movie that invites us to consider the depth of human depravity and instead gives us an efficient and effective cruel comedy, as bloodless as it is ruthless". Akhilesh Nerlekar of Loksatta wrote "The dialogues, background music, cinematography have all come together well. There are subtle mistakes at some places, but if you ignore them, you can enjoy this movie. The works of Swapnil Joshi, Anita Date, Shivani Surve and Subodh Bhave have been done well". Jaydeep Pathak of Maharashtra Times says "Even though the content of the film is very serious and 'tense', 'dark humor' keeps sneaking in the film from time to time with cheesy dialogues. The 'grey' shade in the content perfectly captures Mangesh Dhakane's background score". Subhash K. Jha of Firstpost wrote "Vaalvi is delightfully iconoclastic in its attitude towards middleclass morality". Ajit Andhare of Deccan Chronicle wrote "Something is happening in every scene and it is enough to keep you hooked to the end, albeit with some cliched cinematic liberties". Mayur Sanap of Rediff.com wrote "It has an original setting with very interesting plot, and its suspenseful pace keeps you riveted from the outset". Shaheen Irani of OTTPlay wrote "Vaalvi has an interesting start. It leaves you curious with the clock ticking and the chandeliers moving".

=== Box office ===
Vaalvi has collected ₹1.88 crore at the box office in its first week. Film collected ₹1.40 crore in 4 days and 2.54 crore in 9 days of its release. The film was collected ₹3 crores in the first 2 weeks. It crossed ₹7 crore at box office in five weeks of theatrical run.

== Accolades ==
Award	Year	Category	Recipient(s)	Result	Ref.
National Film Award	2024	Best Feature Film in Marathi	Vaalvi	Won	
Fakt Marathi Cine Sanman	2023	Best Film	Vaalvi	Won	
Fakt Marathi Cine Sanman	2023	Best Director	Paresh Mokashi	Won	
Fakt Marathi Cine Sanman	2023	Best Actor in a Lead Role	Swapnil Joshi	Won	
Fakt Marathi Cine Sanman	2023	Best Actress in a Supporting Role	Anita Date Kelkar	Nominated	
Fakt Marathi Cine Sanman	2023	Best Performance in a Comic Role	Namrata Sambherao	Nominated	
Fakt Marathi Cine Sanman	2023	Best Performance in a Negative Role	Shivani Surve	Nominated	
Fakt Marathi Cine Sanman	2023	Best Story	Madhugandha Kulkarni, Paresh Mokashi	Won	
Fakt Marathi Cine Sanman	2023	Best Screenplay	Madhugandha Kulkarni, Paresh Mokashi	Won	
Fakt Marathi Cine Sanman	2023	Best Dialogue	Madhugandha Kulkarni, Paresh Mokashi	Nominated	
Maharashtracha Favourite Kon?	2024	Favourite Film	Vaalvi	Nominated	
Maharashtracha Favourite Kon?	2024	Favourite Film Critics'	Vaalvi	Nominated	
Maharashtracha Favourite Kon?	2024	Favourite Director	Paresh Mokashi	Nominated	
Maharashtracha Favourite Kon?	2024	Favourite Director Critics'	Paresh Mokashi	Nominated	
Maharashtracha Favourite Kon?	2024	Favourite Actor	Swapnil Joshi	Nominated	
Maharashtracha Favourite Kon?	2024	Favourite Actor	Subodh Bhave	Nominated	
Maharashtracha Favourite Kon?	2024	Favourite Actor Critics'	Subodh Bhave	Nominated	
Maharashtracha Favourite Kon?	2024	Favourite Actor Critics'	Swapnil Joshi	Nominated	
Maharashtracha Favourite Kon?	2024	Favourite Actress	Shivani Surve	Nominated	
Maharashtracha Favourite Kon?	2024	Favourite Supporting Actress	Anita Date	Nominated	
Maharashtracha Favourite Kon?	2024	Favourite Writer Critics'	Madhugandha Kulkarni, Paresh Mokashi	Won	
Zee Chitra Gaurav Puraskar	2024	Best Film	Vaalvi	Nominated	
Zee Chitra Gaurav Puraskar	2024	Best Director	Paresh Mokashi	Nominated	
Zee Chitra Gaurav Puraskar	2024	Best Actor	Swapnil Joshi	Nominated	
Zee Chitra Gaurav Puraskar	2024	Best Supporting Actor	Subodh Bhave	Nominated	
Zee Chitra Gaurav Puraskar	2024	Best Supporting Actress	Anita Date	Nominated	
Zee Chitra Gaurav Puraskar	2024	Best Story	Madhugandha Kulkarni, Paresh Mokashi	Won	
Zee Chitra Gaurav Puraskar	2024	Best Screenplay	Madhugandha Kulkarni, Paresh Mokashi	Nominated	
Zee Chitra Gaurav Puraskar	2024	Best Background Score	Mangesh Dhakade	Nominated	
Zee Chitra Gaurav Puraskar	2024	Best Editing	Saurabh Prabhudesai, Abhijeet Deshpande	Won	
Filmfare Awards Marathi	2024	Best Film	Vaalvi	Nominated	
Filmfare Awards Marathi	2024	Best Director	Paresh Mokashi	Nominated	
Filmfare Awards Marathi	2024	Best Actor	Swapnil Joshi	Nominated	
Filmfare Awards Marathi	2024	Best Supporting Actor	Subodh Bhave	Nominated	
Filmfare Awards Marathi	2024	Best Supporting Actress	Anita Date-Kelkar	Won	
Filmfare Awards Marathi	2024	Best Story	Madhugandha Kulkarni, Paresh Mokashi	Nominated	
Filmfare Awards Marathi	2024	Best Screenplay	Madhugandha Kulkarni, Paresh Mokashi	Won	
Filmfare Awards Marathi	2024	Best Cinematography	Satyajeet Shobha Shreeram	Nominated	
Filmfare Awards Marathi	2024	Best Editing	Abhijeet Deshpande, Saurabh Prabhudesai	Nominated	
Filmfare Awards Marathi	2024	Best Sound Design	Shishir Chousalkar	Nominated	

== Future ==
Vaalvi 2 was announced at a party on the occasion of Paresh Mokashi's birthday. Madhugandha Kulkarni, Paresh Mokashi and Mangesh Kulkarni of Zee Studios announced that they are coming up with Vaalvi 2 soon.
