= Fakt Marathi Cine Sanman for Best Performance in a Comic Role =

Awards for best actor in comic role

Fakt Marathi Cine Sanman for Best Actor in a Comic Role
- Awarded for: Best Performance in a Comic Role
- Country: India
- Presented by: Fakt Marathi
- First award: Siddharth Jadhav, Lochya Zaala Re (2022)
- Currently held by: Sanjay Narvekar, Timepass 3 (2023)

The Fakt Marathi Cine Sanman for Actor in a Comic Role is given by the Fakt Marathi television network as part of its annual awards for Marathi Cinemas. The winners are selected by the jury members. The award was first given in 2022.

Here is a list of the award winners and the nominees of the respective years.

== Winner and nominees ==
Year	Photos of winners	Actor	Roles(s)	Film	Ref.
2022		Siddhartha Jadhav	Maanav	Lochya Zaala Re	
2022		Bhalchandra Kadam	Pandu Hawaldar	Pandu	
2022		Prathamesh Parab	Tushar	Darling	
2022		Samir Choughule	Battasharao Gangawle	Chandramukhi	
2022		Vandana Gupte	Nirmala	Well Done Baby	
2023		Sanjay Narvekar	Dinkar Patil	Timepass 3	
2023		Prathmesh Parab	Dagdu Shantaram Parab	Timepass 3	
2023		Siddhartha Jadhav	Dhanaji Manmode	De Dhakka 2	
2023		Parth Bhalerao	Dhungraj (Dhungya)	Boyz 3	
2023		Paritosh Painter	Adi	Aflatoon	
2023		Namrata Awate Sambherao	Lady	Vaalvi	
