= June (2021 film) =

2021 Indian Marathi film

- Promotional poster
- Directed by: Vaibhav Khisti; Suhrud Godbole
- Written by: Nikhil Mahajan
- Produced by: Akshay Bardapurkar; Shardul Singh Bayas; Nehha Pendse Bayas; Nikhil Mahajan; Pawan Malu
- Starring: Nehha Pendse Bayas; Siddharth Menon
- Cinematography: Quais Waseeq
- Edited by: Nikhil Mahajan; Hrishikesh Petwe
- Music by: Shalmali Kholgade
- Production companies: Supri Advertising and Entertainment; Blue Drop Films
- Distributed by: Planet Marathi; Planet Entertainment
- Release date: 30 June 2021
- Running time: 94 minutes
- Country: India
- Language: Marathi

June is a Marathi film released in 2021 about emotional healing, starring Neha Pendse and Siddharth Menon in lead roles. The film marked the debut of directors Vaibhav Khisti and Suhrud Godbole, and was written by Nikhil Mahajan. The film deals with various social issues, including bullying, sexism, suicide and the generation gap.

== Plot ==
Neel is an engineering student who has failed his exams and hence has taken a break and returned to Chatrapati Sambhajinagar, his home where his disappointed parents stay. To avoid embarrassment, his father never reveals to other about Neel failing the exams but tells only about his break. Relations with his father are hence tensed.

Neha has married Abhijit and due to some marital issues needs her own space away from Abhijit. She comes to Aurangabad, to stay at Abhijit's childhood home, which is in the same housing society where Neel stays. She meets Neel and they get on wrong foot initially. Other society members also disregard her due to her habits of smoking and drinking. Neel and Neha get close as they get to know each other better. Neel takes Neha on various site seeing within the city which Neha finds amusing and Neel rejects them as boring historic monuments of Mughal era.

As they grow closer, they share their past. While in his hostel days, Neel's roommate was an ambitious fellow who gets bullied by other classmates for his unsophisticated mannerisms. He dreamed for scoring high and making his parents proud. Coming from a vernacular Marathi schooling, Neel promises him to help in his studies. However, fed up with bullying, he commits suicide by hanging to the celling fan and Neel finds himself guilty of it. Neel's girlfriend Nicky is unaware of all this. She is not sure if Neel and she would ever marry since they belong to different castes and her parents would not accept. However, she wants to experience making love with him. While in her bedroom, Neel is haunted by his thoughts as he sees the fan. Nicky feels she did something wrong and that he is disgusted because of her bodily hair. She tries shaving her legs; but cuts herself deeply. Neha is disgusted after knowing that Neel rejected his girlfriend due to such a trivial issue and that Nicky went ahead to the extent of injuring herself.

Neel misunderstand Neha's closeness and love and tries to kiss her; which she stops. She reveals her history of how she and Abhijit tried a lot to conceive a baby. However, due to her smoking and drinking habits, she had a miscarriage. Abhijit is supportive; but she blames herself. Next day, Abhijit comes to pick Neha back and they decide to start afresh. Neel also forgives Nicky and decides to study further dedicatedly. Neha departs with Abhijit, when the month of June begins and brings in fresh monsoon showers in the city, ending the summer.

== Cast ==
- Neha Pendse as Neha
- Siddharth Menon as Neel
- Resham Shrivardhan as Nicky
- Kiran Karmarkar as Neel's father
- Jitendra Joshi as Abhijit, Neha's husband
- Sneha Raikar as Neel's mother
- Nilesh Diwekar as Jaiswal, society member

== Soundtrack ==
Shalmali Kholgade, Bollywood playback singer known for her song "Pareshaan" (Ishaqzaade, 2012), debuted as music composer through the film. New video of the song "Baba" was released on 20 June 2021, i.e. International Father's Day which featured actresses Priya Bapat, Amruta Khanvilkar, Girija Oak Godbole, Gauri Nalawade, Mrinmayee Godbole, Resham Shrivardhan, Parna Pethe, Shalmali Kholgade, Aanandi Joshi, Sanskruti Balgude along with Neha Pendse. The song is sung by Aanandi Joshi with lyrics penned by Mahajan, who also wrote the film.

No.	Title	Lyrics	Singer(s)	Length
1.	"Baba"	Nikhil Mahajan	Aanandi Joshi	3:52
2.	"Ha Vaara"	Jitendra Joshi	Shalmali Kholgade	3:09
3.	"Paar Geli"	Jitendra Joshi	Shalmali Kholgade	3:28
4.	"Baba (reprise)"	Nikhil Mahajan	Aanandi Joshi	4:20
Total length:				14:49

== Release ==
The film June completed its principal photography in October 2019 within 18 days due to a limited budget. Many lead actors, including Menon and Pendse, did not charge for their services and contributed money toward its production. The film was set to release in June 2020. However, due to the COVID-19 pandemic, the film did not release. It screened in various festivals, including the Pune Film Festival, International Film Festival of Kerala, New York Indian Film Festival (NYIFF) and 51st International Film Festival of India. At the NYIFF, the film and Menon received nominations for Best Film and Best Actor; where Menon won the award. June was then publicly released and became the first film on the newly launched OTT platform Planet Marathi.

== Reception ==
News 18 in their review about the film called it "a piercing portrayal of class anxiety, moving on and beginning again" and appreciated the script, acting and face paced nature covering various social issues. IANS appreciated the same but also commented on flaws like how some protagonists are shown unchanged or how some changes of heart are sudden and not believable.

=== Accolades ===
Year	Awards	Category	Recipient	Result	Ref.
2020	New York Indian Film Festival	Best Film	June	Nominated	
2020	New York Indian Film Festival	Best Actor	Siddharth Menon	Won	
2021	National Film Awards	Special Mention (feature film)	Siddharth Menon	Won	
2021	Filmfare Awards Marathi	Best Actress	Neha Pendse; Shared with Sai Tamhankar (film Dhurala)	Won	
2021	Filmfare Awards Marathi	Best Debut Actress	Resham Shrivardhan	Won	
2021	Pune International Film Festival	Best Actress	Neha Pendse	Won	
2022	Fakt Marathi Cine Sanman	Best Story	Nikhil Mahajan	Nominated	
2022	Fakt Marathi Cine Sanman	Best Actor in a Lead Role	Siddharth Menon	Nominated	
2022	Fakt Marathi Cine Sanman	Best Actress in a Lead Role	Neha Pendse	Nominated	
2024	Maharashtra State Film Awards	Best Debut Film Production	June	Won	
2024	Maharashtra State Film Awards	Best Debut Direction	Vaibhav Khisti, Suhrud Godbole	Won	
2024	Maharashtra State Film Awards	Best Actor	Siddharth Menon	Nominated	
2024	Maharashtra State Film Awards	Best Debut Actress	Resham Shrivardhan	Nominated	
