= Dharmaveer =

2022 Indian Marathi-language film

- Theatrical release poster
- Directed by: Pravin Tarde
- Written by: Pravin Tarde
- Based on: Anand Dighe
- Produced by: Mangesh Desai
- Starring: Prasad Oak; Kshitish Date; Makarand Paddhye; Snehal Tarde; Shruti Marathe; Gashmeer Mahajani
- Cinematography: Kedar Gaikwad
- Edited by: Mayur Hardas
- Music by: Chinar–Mahesh; Avinash–Vishwajeet
- Production companies: Zee Studios; Sahil Motion Arts
- Distributed by: Zee Studios
- Release date: 13 May 2022
- Running time: 167 minutes
- Country: India
- Language: Marathi
- Budget: est.₹8 crore
- Box office: est.₹26 crore

Dharmaveer is a 2022 Indian Marathi-language biographical political drama film written and directed by Pravin Tarde and produced by Mangesh Desai under the banner of Zee Studios. It covers the story of late Shiv Sena leader Anand Dighe. The film features Prasad Oak, Kshitish Date, Makarand Paddhye, Snehal Tarde and Shruti Marathe in the lead roles.

The film was theatrically released in Indian cinemas on 13 May 2022 and premiered on ZEE5 on 17 June 2022. The film received positive reviews, praising Prasad Oak's performance as Anand Dighe and Pravin Tarde's screenplay, dialogues and direction. Dharmaveer grossed over ₹26 crore (US$2.7 million) at the box office, becoming the third highest grossing Marathi film of 2022. The film went on to win six awards at the 60th Maharashtra State Film Awards, including Best Film, Best Director and Best Actor.

== Plot ==
A TV news reporter Tanvi Mahapatra (Shruti Marathe) arrives at midnight of 26 August at Thane railway station upset over her current assignment of covering the 20th memorial service of late politician Anand Dighe in Thane which made her miss her first Bollywood party. Moreover, she is unaware of who the great personality was and the new article archives & internet sources show that after his death, locals destroyed Sunitidevi Singhania Hospital. The reporter meets an auto-rickshaw driver Sameer (Gashmeer Mahajani) who decides to drop her to her hotel in Louiswadi and tells her that rather than relying on the internet, she should meet the common Thanekars to whom Anand Dighe Saheb devoted his entire life. The story takes back to the early days of Shiv Sena when a young Anand Dighe Saheb is a party worker. Inspired by his work and dedication, he becomes a prominent member of the party and a very close aide of supremo Bal Thackeray where both share great respect towards one another. At the venue, the reporter meets several people right from his mentees Eknath Shinde, Rajan Vichare, Anita Birje his family of two sisters as well as scores of common Thanekars where she finds that Anand Dighe Saheb was not just a political leader but he was much more to Thanekars and devoted his whole life for them. The great personality met with a tragic end but is still alive in the hearts of Thanekars even after his death.

== Cast ==
- Prasad Oak as Anand Dighe
  - Shivraj Waichal as Young Anand Dighe
- Kshitish Date as Eknath Shinde
- Makarand Padhye as Bal Thackeray
- Shruti Marathe as Tanvi Mahapatra
- Gashmeer Mahajani as Sameer
- Vijay Nikam as Mo. Da. Joshi
- Snehal Tarde as Anita Birje
- Vignesh Joshi as Prakash Paranjape
- Abhijeet Khandkekar as Dadaji Bhuse
- Atul Mahajan as Satish Pradhan
- Mangesh Desai as Reporter
- Mohan Joshi as Sameer's Father
- Sagar Pabbale as Rajan Vichare
- Shubhankar Ekbote as Ravindra Phatak
- Prasad Berde as Naresh Mhaske
- Jaywant Wadkar as Inspector Yeshwant Tawde
- Yogesh Shirsat as Vasant Davkhare
- Shubhangi Latkar as Meenatai Thackeray
- Devendra Gaikwad as Aatmaram Thorat
- Ramesh Pardeshi as Hemant Pawar
- Dushyant Wagh as Dilip Owalkar; Anand Dighe's friend
- Prasad Khandekar as Anant Tare
- Jyoti Malse as Malse; Anand Dighe's sister
- Sayalee Parab as Aruna Dighe; Anand Dighe's sister
- Manoj Kolhatkar as Father of raped girl
- Siddhirupa Karmarkar as Mother of raped girl
- Piyush Parmar as Reporter
- Anuj Prabhu as Raj Thackeray
- Sushant Shelar as Inspector Vijay Shelar
- Anshuman Vichare as Hawaldaar
- Sham Mashalkar as Milind Narvekar
- Shivraj Walvekar as Inspector
- Eknath Bhoir as Karyakarta
- Ashish Warang as Ladies bar owner
- Nandkumar Gorule as Nandu
- Digambar Naik

== Production ==
The film was announced on 27 January 2022, by Eknath Shinde. This film is about late Shiv Sena leader Anand Dighe is based on his life and Marathi film actor Prasad Oak will be seen in the role of Dighe. One of the features of this movie is that the Armada car number 'MH05-G-2013' used by Dighe is used in this film.

== Reception ==
Mihir Bhanage of The Times of India gave a rating of 3 out of 5 and wrote that "Prasad Oak brings Anand Dighe to life in this glorified biopic."

== Box office ==
The film released in 400 theaters and expanded to approximately 10,000 screenings due to positive reception. It collected ₹2.05 crore on its opening day and accumulated ₹13.87 crore in its initial week. It was well-received in cities such as Thane, Kalyan, Dombivli, Pune, Nashik, and Mumbai. Within 10 days, it had grossed ₹18.03 crore. The film's net earnings totaled ₹20 crore, with a gross revenue exceeding ₹22.58 crore by the third week. The film grossed over ₹26 crore in its lifetime run.

== Soundtrack ==
The soundtrack is composed by Chinar–Mahesh and Avinash–Vishwajeet.

| No. | Title | Lyrics | Singer(s) | Length |
|---|---|---|---|---|
| 1. | "Gurupournima" | Manish Rajgire | Manish Rajgire | 07:02 |
| 2. | "Dhanya Wagh" | Shahir Nandesh | Shahir Nandesh | 05:44 |
| 3. | "Ashtami" | Adarsh Shinde | Adarsh Shinde | 06:38 |
| 4. | "Theme of Dharmaveer" | Manish Rajgire | Manish Rajgire | 02:09 |
| 5. | "Anand Harapla" | Saurabh Salunkhe | Saurabh Salunkhe | 05:39 |
| Total length: | | | | 27:39 |

== Accolades ==
| Awards | Year | Category | Recipient | Result | Ref |
|---|---|---|---|---|---|
| Fakt Marathi Cine Sanman | 2022 | Best Film | Zee Studios; Sahil Motion Arts | Won | |
| Fakt Marathi Cine Sanman | 2022 | Best Director | Pravin Tarde | Won | |
| Fakt Marathi Cine Sanman | 2022 | Best Story | Pravin Tarde | Nominated | |
| Fakt Marathi Cine Sanman | 2022 | Best Screenplay | Pravin Tarde | Nominated | |
| Fakt Marathi Cine Sanman | 2022 | Best Dialogue | Pravin Tarde | Won | |
| Fakt Marathi Cine Sanman | 2022 | Best Actor in a Lead Role | Prasad Oak | Won | |
| Fakt Marathi Cine Sanman | 2022 | Best Actor in a Supporting Role | Kshitish Date | Nominated | |
| Fakt Marathi Cine Sanman | 2022 | Best Actress in a Supporting Role | Snehal Tarde | Nominated | |
| Fakt Marathi Cine Sanman | 2022 | Best Playback Singer Male | Adarsh Shinde (song "Astami") | Won | |
| Fakt Marathi Cine Sanman | 2022 | Best Music Director | Chinar-Mahesh (song "Anand Harpala") | Nominated | |
| Fakt Marathi Cine Sanman | 2022 | Best Lyricist | Mangesh Kangane (song "Anand Harpala") | Won | |
| Filmfare Awards Marathi | 2023 | Best Film | Zee Studios; Sahil Motion Arts | Nominated | |
| Filmfare Awards Marathi | 2023 | Best Director | Pravin Tarde | Nominated | |
| Filmfare Awards Marathi | 2023 | Best Actor | Prasad Oak | Won | |
| Filmfare Awards Marathi | 2023 | Best Lyricist | Mangesh Kangane | Nominated | |
| Filmfare Awards Marathi | 2023 | Best Male Playback Singer | Saurabh Salunkhe | Nominated | |
| Filmfare Awards Marathi | 2023 | Best Dialogue | Pravin Tarde | Won | |
| Filmfare Awards Marathi | 2023 | Best Actor Critics' | Prasad Oak | Nominated | |
| Filmfare Awards Marathi | 2023 | Best Choreography | Umesh Jadhav | Nominated | |
| Zee Chitra Gaurav Puraskar | 2023 | Best Actor | Prasad Oak | Won | |
| Zee Chitra Gaurav Puraskar | 2023 | Best Supporting Actor | Kshitish Date | Nominated | |
| Zee Chitra Gaurav Puraskar | 2023 | Best Playback Singer – Male | Manish Rajgire (song "Gurupournima") | Nominated | |
| Zee Chitra Gaurav Puraskar | 2023 | Best Makeup Artist | Vidyadhar Bhatte | Nominated | |
| Sakal Premier Awards | 2023 | Best Actor | Prasad Oak | Won | |
| Sakal Premier Awards | 2023 | Best Dialogue | Pravin Tarde | Won | |
| Sakal Premier Awards | 2023 | Best Choreography | Umesh Jadhav | Won | |
| Sakal Premier Awards | 2023 | Best Supporting Actor | Kshitij Date | Won | |
| Sakal Premier Awards | 2023 | Best Background Music | Avinash-Vishwajeet | Won | |
| Sakal Premier Awards | 2023 | Best Playback Singer Male | Manish Rajgire | Won | |
| Maharashtra State Film Awards | 2025 | Best Film I | Dharmaveer | Won | |
| Maharashtra State Film Awards | 2025 | Best Director I | Pravin Tarde | Won | |
| Maharashtra State Film Awards | 2025 | Best Dialogue | Pravin Tarde | Won | |
| Maharashtra State Film Awards | 2025 | Best Actor | Prasad Oak | Won | |
| Maharashtra State Film Awards | 2025 | Best Supporting Actress | Snehal Tarde | Nominated | |
| Maharashtra State Film Awards | 2025 | Best Playback Singer Male | Manish Rajgire (song "Bhetla Vitthal Majha") | Won | |
| Maharashtra State Film Awards | 2025 | Best Background Music | Avinash–Vishwajeet | Nominated | |
| Maharashtra State Film Awards | 2025 | Best Choreography | Umesh Jadhav (song "Aai Jagdambe") | Won | |

== Sequel ==
A sequel to Dharmaveer, titled Dharmaveer 2, was shortly announced. Directed by Pravin Tarde and produced by Mangesh Desai, the sequel continues the biographical narrative of Shiv Sena leader Anand Dighe. It released on 27 September 2024.
