= Elizabeth Ekadashi =

- Theatrical release poster
- Directed by: Paresh Mokashi
- Screenplay by: Paresh Mokashi
- Story by: Madhugandha Kulkarni
- Produced by: Nitin Keni; Nikhil Sane; Madhugandha Kulkarni
- Starring: Shrirang Mahajan; Sayali Bhandarkavathekar; Pushkar Lonarkar; Nandita Patkar; Vanmala Kinikar
- Cinematography: Amol Gole
- Edited by: Abhijeet Deshpande
- Music by: Anand Modak
- Production companies: Essel Vision; Mayasabha productions
- Distributed by: Essel Vision
- Release date: 14 November 2014
- Running time: 90 minutes
- Country: India
- Language: Marathi
- Budget: ₹1.5 crore (US$160,000)
- Box office: ₹7 crore (US$730,000)

Elizabeth Ekadashi is a 2014 Indian Marathi film directed by Paresh Mokashi and written by Madhugandha Kulkarni. The film, which tells the tale of a child and his set of friends living in Pandharpur, was selected as the opening film of the Indian Panorama section at the International Film Festival of India, 2014. The film had its national release on 14 November 2014.

== Plot ==
Dnyanesh and Mukta are siblings who live in the pilgrim town of Pandharpur, Maharashtra with their mother and grandmother. The title's eponymous 'Elizabeth' is a bicycle that is gifted to the talented Dnyanesh by his father. It is revealed in the film that the bicycle is named 'Elizabeth' and the meaning of the word is translated into Marathi as Tikau(Durable) considering the fact that the Queen Elizabeth II lived a long life.

Following his father's death, Dnyanesh desires to support his mother financially by setting up a shop. His mother, however, urges him to concentrate on his studies rather than business. The family lives in dire financial conditions and on the eve of the holy day of Ashadhi Ekadashi, financial necessity forces Dnyanesh's mother to sell Elizabeth to a pawn-shark.

The film follows Dnyanesh and his friends' efforts to recover Elizabeth. They together set up a stall of bangles on their "Elizabeth" the bicycle all by themselves, unknown to their mother and earn profits enough to repay their loans and in a bid to save Elizabeth from being sold to someone else. In the end, a crisis occurs but all thanks to Vitthal Mauli and his blessings, the matter is solved and the financial condition gets better.

== Cast ==
- Shrirang Mahajan as Dnyanesh
- Sayali Bhandarkavathekar as Mukta
- Pushkar Lonarkar
- Nandita Patkar
- Vanmala Kinikar
- Chaitanya Badve
- Durgesh Badve-Mahajan
- Chaitanya Kulkarni
- Ashwini Bhalekar
- Dhananjay (Prasad) Godbole
- Anil Kamble
- Aniruddha Prasad Kulkarni

== Music ==
One of the songs featured in the film, "Dagad dagad", was composed by the music director Anand Modak and sung by Sharayu Date.

== Release ==
The film was released on India's Children's Day, following which it was well received across Maharashtra.

== Accolades ==
- National Film Award for Best Children's Film
- Government of Maharashtra Sant Tukaram Best International Marathi Film Award, Pune International Film Festival 2015
- Best Film at Zee Chitragaurav Awards 2015
