= Goshta Eka Paithanichi =

Indian Marathi-language film

- Official poster
- Directed by: Shantanu Rode
- Written by: Shantanu Rode
- Produced by: Akshay Bardapurkar; Abhayanand Singh; Piiyush Singh; Saurabh Gupta
- Starring: Sayali Sanjeev; Suvrat Joshi
- Cinematography: Devendra Golatkar
- Edited by: Manish Shirke
- Music by: Susmit Limaye
- Production companies: Planet Marathi; Golden Ratio Films; Films Lakeside Productions
- Distributed by: AA Films
- Release date: 2 December 2022
- Running time: 123 minutes
- Country: India
- Language: Marathi

Goshta Eka Paithanichi (transl. Tale of a Paithani) is a 2022 Marathi language film written and directed by Shantanu Ganesh Rode, produced by Akshay Bardapurkar, Abhayanand Singh, and Piiyush Singh under the banner of Planet Marathi, Golden Ratio Films, and Lakeside Productions. The film stars Sayali Sanjeev, Suvrat Joshi, Milind Gunaji and Mrinal Kulkarni.

The film won the National Film Award for Best Feature Film in Marathi at India's 68th National Film Awards. Sayali won Filmfare award for best actress at Filmfare Awards.

== Cast ==
- Sayali Sanjeev as Indrayani
- Suvrat Joshi as Sujit
- Aarav Shetye as Shree
- Mrinal Kulkarni as Smitatai
- Mohan Joshi as Karandikar
- Milind Gunaji as Inamdar
- Shashank Ketkar as Subodh
- Aditi Dravid as Meena
- Prajakta Hanamghar as Chanda
- Madhura Velankar as Akkasaheb
- Girija Oak as Sheela
- Savita Malpekar as Aaji
- Suhita Thatte as Mai
- Sandeep Redkar as Fatakewala
- Jaywant Wadkar as Driver
- Sunil Holkar as Ashok
- Ganesh Yadav as Thief
- Poornima Ahire Kende
- Nidhi Rasane as Pinki

== Production ==
Principal photography began on 24 November 2019 in Mumbai. Filming also took place in Pune and Bhor. Principal photography wrapped up in February 2020. A official teaser of the film was released on 11 May 2020.

== Soundtrack ==
Track listing
No.	Title	Lyrics	Music	Singer(s)	Length
1.	"Bahar Aala"	Manik-Ganesh	Manik-Ganesh	Shankar Mahadevan	2:42
2.	"Paithani"	Manik-Ganesh	Manik-Ganesh	Bela Shende	2:12
Total length:					4:54

== Release ==
The film was released on 2 December 2022.

== Accolades ==
Awards	Year	Category	Recipient(s)	Result	Ref.
National Film Awards	2020	Best Feature Film in Marathi	Goshta Eka Paithanichi	Won	
Maharashtra State Film Awards	2024	Best Film III	Goshta Eka Paithanichi	Won	
Maharashtra State Film Awards	2024	Best Director III	Shantanu Rode	Won	
Maharashtra State Film Awards	2024	Best Dialogue	Shantanu Rode	Won	
Maharashtra State Film Awards	2024	Best Screenplay	Shantanu Rode	Won	
Maharashtra State Film Awards	2024	Best Story	Shantanu Rode	Won	
Maharashtra State Film Awards	2024	Best Actress	Sayali Sanjeev	Nominated	
Maharashtra State Film Awards	2024	Best Choreography	Sujit Kumar	Nominated	
Maharashtra State Film Awards	2024	Best Editing	Manish Shirke	Won	
Filmfare Awards Marathi	7th Filmfare Awards Marathi	Filmfare Award for Best Actress – Marathi	Sayali Sanjeev	Won	
Filmfare Awards Marathi	7th Filmfare Awards Marathi	Filmfare Award for Best Story – Marathi	Shantanu Rode	Won	
Filmfare Awards Marathi	7th Filmfare Awards Marathi	Filmfare Award for Best dialogue – Marathi	Shantanu Rode	Nominated	
Filmfare Awards Marathi	7th Filmfare Awards Marathi	Filmfare Critics Award for Best Film – Marathi	Shantanu Rode	Nominated	
Filmfare Awards Marathi	7th Filmfare Awards Marathi	Filmfare Critics Award for Best Actress – Marathi	Sayali Sanjeev	Nominated	
2023	Fakt Marathi Cine Sanman	Fakt Marathi Cine Sanman for Best Actress in a Lead Role	Sayali Sanjeev	Nominated	
2023	Fakt Marathi Cine Sanman	Fakt Marathi Cine Sanman for Best Film	Planet Marathi, Golden Ratio Films, Films Lakeside Productions	Nominated	
2023	Fakt Marathi Cine Sanman	Best Director	Shantanu Rode	Nominated	
2023	Fakt Marathi Cine Sanman	Best Story	Shantanu Rode	Nominated	
2023	Fakt Marathi Cine Sanman	Best Screenplay	Shantanu Rode	Nominated	
2023	Sakal Premier Awards	Premier Best Actress	Sayali Sanjeev	Won	
