= Bali (2021 film) =

2021 Marathi horror film by Vishal Furia

- Release poster
- Directed by: Vishal Furia
- Story by: Swapnila Gupta; Vishal Furia
- Produced by: Arjun Singgh Baran; Kartk D Nishandar
- Starring: Swwapnil Joshi; Pooja Sawant
- Cinematography: Rajan Sohani
- Edited by: Abhijeet Deshpande; Sourabh Prabhudesai
- Music by: Score: Ranjan Patnaik; Brince Bora
- Production companies: Global Sports Entertainment and Media Solutions Private Limited
- Distributed by: Amazon Prime Video
- Release date: 9 December 2021
- Running time: 103 minutes
- Country: India
- Language: Marathi

Bali is a 2021 Indian Marathi language horror film directed by Vishal Furia and produced by GSEAMS. The film bankrolled by Arjun Singh Baran and Kartik Nishandar, features Swapnil Joshi and Pooja Sawant in lead roles. The film revolves around widowed father and his seven-year-old son, who starts talking to a mysterious nurse. It was scheduled to be theatrically released on 16 April 2021, but its release was postponed due to the pandemic. The film premiered on Amazon Prime Video on 9 December 2021.

== Synopsis ==
Life of a widowed father turns upside down when his seven-year-old son, faints and taken to hospital for a detailed diagnosis. The son starts talking to a mysterious nurse which he claims is staying in the deserted part of the hospital.

== Cast ==
- Swwapnil Joshi as Shrikant Sathe
- Pooja Sawant as Dr. Radhika Shenoy
- Samarth Jadhav as Mandar Shrikant Sathe, Shrikant's son
- Pritam Kagne
- Rohit Kokate
- Sanjay Ranadive
- Shraddha Kaul
- Abhishek Bachankar
- Mahesh Bodas
- Umesh Ghalsasi

== Production ==
In November 2019, Swapnil Joshi was cast to play lead role in the horror film. The filming was completed in February 2020. The post-production work of the film started in June 2020.

== Reception ==
Pooja Darade of Leisure Byte rated the film with 3 stars out of five and praised the performance of Swapnil Joshi, writing, "he as the caring and worried father, did a fantastic job". Darade appreciated the performance of Samarth Jadhav as Mandar, writing, "[Samarth Jadhav] wowed me the most, he’s highly expressive in scenes and situations that demand only the best." Concluding she wrote, "Overall, Vishal Furia has delivered yet another terrifying and wicked narrative that needs your attention." She further wrote, "The premise is gripping, the screenplay is good in parts, and the performances are fantastic."
