= Soyrik =

- Promotional release poster
- Directed by: Makarand Mane
- Written by: Makarand Mane
- Produced by: Vijay Shinde; Shashank Shende; Makarand Mane
- Starring: Nitish Chavan; Manasi Bhawalkar; Shashank Shende
- Cinematography: Yogesh Koli
- Edited by: Mohit Takalkar
- Music by: Vijay Narayan Gavande
- Production companies: 99 Productions; Bahuroopi Productions
- Release date: 11 February 2022
- Country: India
- Language: Marathi

Soyrik is a 2022 Indian Marathi-language romantic drama film written and directed by Makarand Mane, starring Nitish Chavan, Manasi Bhawalkar and Shashank Shende in the leading roles. The film is produced by 99 Productions and Bahuroopi Productions. It was theatrically released on 11 February 2022.

== Cast ==
- Manasi Bhawalkar
- Nitish Chavan
- Shashank Shende
- Rajshree Nikam
- Chhaya Kadam
- Priyadarshini Indalkar
- Kishor Kadam
- Neeta Shende
- Sanjeevkumar Patil
- Rajendra Kamble
- Yogesh Nikam
- Aparna Kshemkalyani
- Aarav Pawar
- Shanthanu Gangane
- Ovi Tadwalkar
- Praful Kamble
- Chaitanya Deore
- Lara Salunke
- Vanmala Kinikar
- Pratiksha Kote
- Shamraj Bhagavant
- Ishan Godse
- Aparna Gavhane

== Release ==
The film was released on 11 February 2022 in theatres.

== Reception ==
A reviewer from The Times of India rated 3.0/5 and wrote "Soyrik is an offbeat film, compared to mainstream Marathi films. While it's a bit stretched and low on pace in parts, the film presents an important topic that makes you question a lot of things and hope for changes in the society."

== Soundtrack ==
Soyrik

Soundtrack album by Vijay Narayan Gavande
- Released: 2022
- Genre: Feature film soundtrack
- Length: 11:00
- Language: Marathi
- Label: Aditi Music Company

The music is composed by Vijay Narayan Gavande and lyrics is by Vaibhav Deshmukh. The film's songs was performed by Ajay Gogawale, Amita Ghugari and Shamika Bhide.

All lyrics are written by Vaibhav Deshmukh; all music is composed by Vijay Gavande.

Track listing
No.	Title	Singer (s)	Length
1.	"Malvat"	Ajay Gogavale	3:46
2.	"Kaina"	Amita Ghugari	3:23
3.	"Pailteer"	Shamika Bhide, Ashish Deshmukh	4:05
Total length:			11:00
