= Paresh Mokashi =

Indian film director (born 1969)

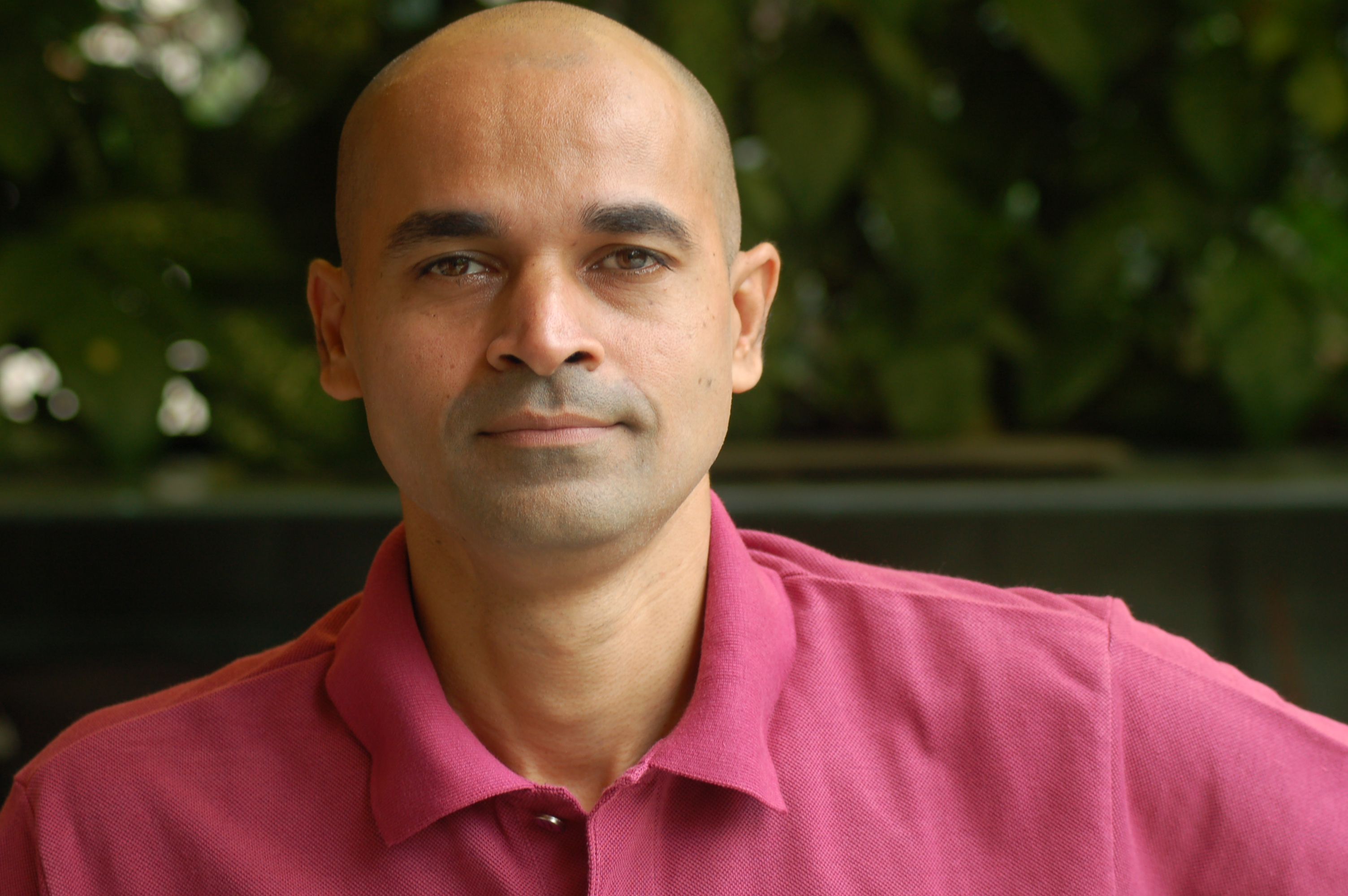
- Mokashi in 2009
- Born: 6 February 1969 (age 57); Pune, Maharashtra, India
- Occupations: Theatre director; Film director; Theatrical producer; Film producer; Screenwriter; Actor
- Years active: 1988–present
- Spouse: Madhugandha Kulkarni

Paresh Mokashi (born 6 February 1969) is an Indian filmmaker, producer, actor and Theatre director-producer; working predominantly in Marathi cinema and Marathi theatre. He started working as a backstage worker for theatre and did few minor roles for plays as well as films. Mokashi made his directorial debut for theatre with the Marathi play, Sangeet Debuchya Mulee in 1999. He continued to work for theatre and made his directorial debut for cinema with the 2009 Marathi feature film, Harishchandrachi Factory. The film depicts the making of India's first full-length feature film, Raja Harishchandra (1913), made by Dadasaheb Phalke. The film was acclaimed critically and won several awards. It was also selected as India's official entry to 82nd Academy Awards in the Best Foreign Language Film category.

== Personal life ==
Paresh Mokashi was born to a Maharashtrian family in Pune and was brought up in Lonavala. He is a grandson of a noted Marathi writer D. B. Mokashi. Mokashi finished his schooling in Lonavla and acquired Bachelor of Arts degree from a Pune-based college. He has also formed his production company, "Mayasabha Productions", which has produced some of his own work including his 2005 Marathi play, Samudra and 2009 Marathi film, Harishchandrachi Factory. He currently lives in Mumbai and is married to theatre actor-writer Madhugandha Kulkarni, who had also done a minor role in Mokashi's debut film, Harishchandrachi Factory. Mokashi's struggle to make the film is included as one of the twenty inspiring stories in the book "Connect the Dots" by Rashmi Bansal, under the title "Truth Shall Prevail" in "Zubaan" section of the book.

== Career ==
=== Theatre ===
"I started doing rounds of Mumbai showbiz industry but soon realized that I cant do this actor's struggle. I left acting long back because to me it was a much more difficult process. I wasn't at ease with the whole idea of acting. I realised that I was happier with behind the camera work."

— Paresh Mokashi on leaving acting as a career.

Mokashi started as a backstage worker for a theatre group in Pune. He has been associated with Marathi theatre since 1988 and worked as an actor in Pune based organisations like Theatre Academy and Maharashtra Cultural Center. He also participated in the plays made for children by a Berlin based theatre group, Grips-Theater. After acting in couple of plays, Mokashi got associated with Prithvi Theatre, Mumbai. While working as an organiser for their theatre festivals, Mokashi directed his first play Sangeet Debuchya Mulee (Debu's Daughters: The Musical) in Marathi for 1999 Prithvi Theatre festival. The play was also written by Mokashi himself. He directed few more plays including Mukam Post Bombilwadi (Bombilwadi: The Village), Sangeet Lagnakallol (The Roaring Marriage: The Musical) and Samudra (The Ocean).

All his plays got critical acclaim and won several awards on release. Sangeet Debuchya Mulee made satirical comments on the current communal harmony in India, through the daughters of a saintly social reformer in Maharashtra, Debuji Zhingraji Janorkar, popularly known as Gadge Maharaj. The play's narrative format used Kirtans, call-and-response chanting or responsory, which were popularised by the 13th-century Hindu saint, Dnyaneshwar and another 16th-century Varkari saint, Tukaram. His 2001 comedy play, Mukam Post Bombilwadi, showcased tumultuous events upon Adolf Hitler's accidental landing in a small village in coastal Maharashtra. The 2004 musical play, Sangeet Lagnakallol, was set in early 1900s referencing the characters and situations from Shripad Krushna Kolhatkar's book, Sudaamyaache Pohe (1910) and Ram Ganesh Gadkari's book, Sampoorna Baalakraam (1925). His other plays like Mangalawarache Mundake (2001) discussed environmental concerns and Samudra (2005), starring Atul Kulkarni, explored a mystery based upon ancient Vedic mythological history.

=== Feature films ===
Mokashi did a few small-time roles for Hindi TV serials and feature films, including Sanjay Leela Bhansali's Hum Dil De Chuke Sanam (1999) but soon he turned to writing and directing. Mokashi came across a biography of Dadasaheb Phalke, also known as the father of Indian cinema, written by Bapu Watve. With an idea of making film on Phalke, Mokashi started his research with the help of National Film Archive of India, Pune and finished the script by March 2005. As Mokashi did not undergo any formal training for film-making and did not assist any other film directors earlier, he found it difficult to find producers for the film and it took three years to raise finances for the film. Declining the suggestions of making the film in Hindi, casting big stars, adding at least one title track, Mokashi decided to produce the film by himself through his production company, "Mayasabha Productions". Made with the budget of ₹40 million (US$420,000), Mokashi had to mortgage his house to complete the film.

Mokashi made directorial debut with his much acclaimed feature film, Harishchandrachi Factory. The film shoot was completed in December 2005 and post production work was finished in eight months in 2008. In an interview with Rediff.com, Mokashi told that the film "had a technical release in the remote places of Maharashtra so [it] could participate in various festivals across the country." The film made in Marathi language depicts the struggle of Dadasaheb Phalke in making of India's first full-length feature film, Raja Harishchandra (1913). Unlike typical biopic films, Mokashi used light humoured adventure style for the film. The film gathered wide critical acclaim and Mokashi was praised for the narrative storyline of the film. The film also participated in several national and international film festivals. It was selected as India's official entry to 82nd Academy Awards in the Best Foreign Language Film category along with 62nd British Academy Film Awards and 66th Golden Globe Awards but was not listed among the final five nominations.

Mokashi's next feature film Elizabeth Ekadashi was released on 14 November 2014. It revolved around kids growing up in poverty who have to sell off their bicycle to make the ends meet. The film received critical acclaim and commercial success and was selected as the opening film of 'Indian Panorama' at The International Film Festival of India (IFFI). Along with the Tamil film Kaaka Muttai, the film won National Film Award for Best Children's Film at the 62nd National Film Awards in 2015. His next directorial, the romantic comedy Chi Va Chi Sau Ka (2017), starred Lalit Prabhakar and Mrinmayee Godbole. Ganesh Matkari of Pune Mirror was unimpressed with the film as "not Paresh Mokashi’s best work till date," but found it "reasonably amusing". Following a 5-year hiatus, Mokashi returned to film with the dark comedy Vaalvi, about a husband (Swapnil Joshi) planning to murder his mentally unstable wife (Anita Date-Kelkar). Nandini Ramnath of Scroll.in was appreciative of Mokashi's direction and wrote, "The pitch-perfect cast has just the right attitude to a movie that invites us to consider the depth of human depravity and instead gives us an efficient and effective cruel comedy, as bloodless as it is ruthless".

== Other work ==
After Mokashi's film competed for Academy Awards, in July 2010, he launched Shailaja Dekhmukh's Marathi book "...And The Oscar Goes To..." about Academy award-winning films and its history. In January 2011, he inaugurated 5th National Book Exhibition at Nagpur and mentioned that if he hadn't read Dadasaheb Phalke's biography in 2005, he would not have made the film. In March 2011, UTV World Movies launched a short film contest, "Premier: The Short Film Festival", for amateur and professional film makers. Mokashi was on the jury panel along with writer-director Sooni Taraporevala and director Raj Kumar Gupta. The top three winners were given a chance to work with Mokashi. In November 2011, Mokashi was made part of Disney and PVR Cinemas' joint initiative "My City My Parks", which focused on encouraging children about urban greenery. Mokashi inaugurated the event along with Bollywood actor Abhay Deol and director Amole Gupte. The child participants of the event were asked to create a project on the topic of environmental conservation, in the form of a film, photo-journal, murals or a theatre performance. Gupte and Mokashi also worked as mentors for the shortlisted participants.

=== Seminars and discussions ===
Mokashi has attended several seminars and discussions about Indian cinema. In August 2010, Film and Television Institute of India in collaboration with Film Writers Association, India organised a two-day seminar on film scripts, "The Uniqueness of the Indian Script", at Pune. Mokashi was part of seminar session, "The Road Ahead: Globalism, the Digital Revolution and Other Attractions", with actor Kamal Haasan as its chairperson. The session also included other filmmakers like Rakeysh Omprakash Mehra, Rohan Sippy and Vikramaditya Motwane. In May 2011, Mokashi was seen explaining and exploring the myths about Indian history in an event organised by actor Nandu Madhav, who had portrayed Dadasaheb Phalke in Mokashi's film. At 84th Akhil Bharatiya Marathi Sahitya Sammelan in December 2011, he opened a discussion about Marathi cinema with fellow participants like actor Mohan Agashe, actress Mrinal Kulkarni, Smita Talwalkar and director Umesh Vinayak Kulkarni. He mentioned that Marathi film industry should experiment with new subjects, however he also said that these experimentations may not guarantee favourable audience responses. In May 2012, Mokashi participated in the centenary of Indian cinema celebration organised by P. L. Deshpande Arts Academy in Mumbai. He was accompanied by another Marathi film director, Chandrakant Kulkarni, and was involved in two discussions, "Dadasaheb Phalke's cinematic journey" and "Hundred Years of Indian Cinema".

== Filmography ==
Key
†	Denotes films that have not yet been released

Year	Title	Credited as				Notes
Year	Title	Actor	Director	Writer	Producer	Notes
1985	Kokaru	Yes				One-act play by Madhavi Purandare
1985	Padgham	Yes				Play; Directed by Jabbar Patel, written by Arun Sadhu
1986	Nako Re Baba	Yes				Play by Grips-Theater
1986	Pahila Paan	Yes				Play by Grips-Theater
1999	Hum Dil De Chuke Sanam	Yes				
1999	Gubbare	Yes				Hindi TV Serial • Episode 7: Dhan-Te-Nan (An East-side Story) • Episode 21: Tie Breaker
1999	Sangeet Debuchya Mulee		Yes	Yes		Play
2001	Mukam Post Bombilwadi		Yes	Yes		Play
2001	Mangalawarache Mundake		Yes	Yes		Play
2004	Sangeet Lagnakallol		Yes	Yes		Play
2005	Samudra		Yes	Yes	Yes	Play
2009	Harishchandrachi Factory	Yes	Yes	Yes	Yes	Feature film
2014	Elizabeth Ekadashi		Yes	Yes	Yes	Feature film
2017	Chi Va Chi Sau Ka		Yes	Yes	Yes	Feature film
2023	Vaalvi		Yes	Yes		Feature film
2024	Nach Ga Ghuma		Yes	Yes		Feature film
2025	Mu. Po. Bombilwaadi		Yes			Feature film
TBA	Bhaykatha Heer Ranjha Ki †		Yes			Feature film
TBA	Vaalvi 2 †		Yes			Feature film

== Awards ==
Year	Award	Category	Nominated work	Result	Ref(s)
2004	Alpha Gaurav Awards	Best Director	Sangeet Lagnakallol	Won	
2008	56th National Film Awards	National Film Award for Best Feature Film in Marathi	Harishchandrachi Factory	Won	
2008	Maharashtra State Film Award	Maharashtra State Film Award for Best Film	Harishchandrachi Factory	Won	
2008	Maharashtra State Film Award	Maharashtra State Film Award for Best Director	Harishchandrachi Factory	Won	
2009	Gollapudi Srinivas Award	Best Debutant Director	Harishchandrachi Factory	Won	
2009	Ahmedabad International Film Festival	Best Feature Film	Harishchandrachi Factory	Won	
2009	18th Aravindan Puraskaram	Best Debutant Director	Harishchandrachi Factory	Won	
2009	Balasaheb Sarpotdar Award	Best Feature Film	Harishchandrachi Factory	Won	
2009	14th International Film Festival of Kerala	Hassan Kutty Award for Best Debut Indian Film	Harishchandrachi Factory	Won	
2009	India's Official entry	Academy Award for Best Foreign Language Film	Harishchandrachi Factory	Not Nominated	
2009	1st International Film Festival Kolhapur	Public Choice Award	Harishchandrachi Factory	Won	
2009	Marathi International Film and Theatre Awards	Best Screenplay	Harishchandrachi Factory	Won	
2009	Pune International Film Festival	Best Director (Marathi Section)	Harishchandrachi Factory	Won	
2010	Indian Film Festival of Los Angeles	Audience Choice Awards	Harishchandrachi Factory	Won	
2015	62nd National Film Awards	National Film Award for Best Children's Film	Elizabeth Ekadashi	Won	
2015	Pune International Film Festival	Sant Tukaram" Best International Marathi Film	Elizabeth Ekadashi	Won	
2024	National Film Award	Best Feature Film in Marathi	Vaalvi	Won	
2024	Filmfare Awards Marathi	Filmfare Award for Best Dialogue – Marathi	Aatmapamphlet	Won	

Other awards

- 2009 – Maharashtra Ratna: Jewel of Maharashtra
- 2010 – Majha Sanman Puraskar: Excellence in art
- 2010 – Acharya Atre Foundation, Pune: Excellence in cinema
- 2011 – P. B. Bhave Memorial Trust: Excellence in cinema
- 2012 – The Maharashtra Chapter of the Federation of Film Society of India: Contribution to the Marathi cinema.
