= Ananya (film) =

2022 film by Pratap Phad

- Directed by: Pratap Phad
- Starring: Hruta Durgule; Amey Wagh; Suvrat Joshi
- Cinematography: Arjun Sarote
- Music by: Sameer Saptiskar
- Release date: 22 July 2022
- Country: India
- Language: Marathi

Ananya is an Indian Marathi-language film directed by Pratap Phad and produced by Ravi Jadhav and Dhruv Das. The film stars Hruta Durgule, Amey Wagh, Chetan Chitnis, Yogesh Soman. Music by Sameer Saptiskar. The film was released on 22 July 2022.

== Synopsis ==
When a spirit-crushing mishap disrupts Ananya's perfect life, she cannot seem to stop sulking over her miseries. However, a whole new world of possibilities opens up after she decides to stand on her own two feet.

== Cast ==
- Hruta Durgule as Ananya Deshmukh
- Amey Wagh as Jay Dixit
- Suvrat Joshi as Dhananjay Deshmukh
- Chetan Chitnis as Shekhar Sarpotdar
- Rucha Apte as Priyanka Deshpande
- Yogesh Soman as Avinash Deshmukh
- Sunil Abhyankar as Nikama Deshpande
- Renuka Daftardar as Rama Deshpande
- Shivraj Walvekar as Madhavrao Sarpotdar
- Leena Pandit as Shalini Sarpotdar

== Production ==
=== Filming ===
Muhurat shot and formal launch was done on 13 January 2020 in Pune, India. Principal photography began that day, as informed by the makers. On 7 February 2020, entire shooting of the film has been wrapped up.

== Soundtrack ==
Ananya

Soundtrack album by Sameer Saptiskar
- Released: 2022
- Recorded: 2022
- Genre: Feature film soundtrack
- Length: 16:04
- Language: Marathi

Official audio
- Ananya – Full Album on YouTube

Track listing
No.	Title	Singer(s)	Length
1.	"Tu Dhagdhgti Aag"	Vishal Dadlani	5:28
2.	"Na Kalata"	Bela Shende	3:56
3.	"Alahida Parawa"	Mugda Karhade	3:23
4.	"Celebration"	Neha Adarsh Shinde	2:54
5.	"A Special Moment"	Mandar Pilwalkar, Radhika Nandey	1:43
Total length:			16:04

== Critical response ==
Ananya film received positive reviews from critics. A reviewer of The Times of India gave the film 3.5 stars out of 5 and wrote "Hruta Durgule’s performance is praiseworthy. Her portrayal of Ananya’s silent frustration will grip you to your core. Amey Wagh comes in as a chaotic character that induces a bit of levity into the story". Salonee Mistry of Pune Mirror gave the film 3 stars out of 5 and wrote "the film makes you smile, cry and feel proud of Ananya. A film that connects with you this well doesn’t get made every day". Suyog Zore of Cinestaan.com gave the film 3 stars out of 5 and wrote "Overall, Ananya is a well-made drama about the girl's struggle to overcome her physical disability with courage and determination". Reshma Raikwar of Loksatta says "On the strength of good production values, story-direction, good acting, background music, 'Ananya' has been successful in portraying a story of stubborn stubbornness effectively". KalpeshRaj Kubal of Maharashtra Times gave the film 3.5 stars out of 5 and Wrote "A discerning viewer will not fail to feel this 'exclusive general interest'. And for those who just want to be entertained, the movie has drama and comedy". Vinod Ghatge of ABP Majha gave the film 3.5 stars out of 5 and Wrote "There is no doubt that 'Ananya' as a movie will surely give you the experience of watching something nice, positive and cool".
