= Pravin Tarde =

Indian film director and screenwriter (born 1974)

Pravin Vittal Tarde
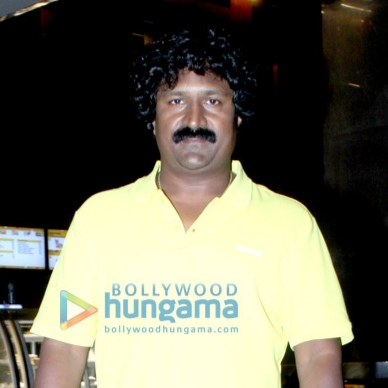
- Born: 11 November 1974 (age 51); Pune, Maharashtra, India
- Education: Bharati Vidyapeeth; Shankarrao More Vidyalaya and Junior College; Yashwantrao Mohite College; ILS Law College
- Occupations: Actor; Film director; Screenwriter; Film producer
- Spouse: Snehal Tarde (m. 2009)

Pravin Vitthal Tarde (born 11 November 1974) is an Indian actor, film director and screenwriter working in the Marathi cinema best known for his Marathi films Deool Band, Mulshi Pattern, Sarsenapati Hambirrao.

== Filmography ==
=== Films ===
Key
†	Denotes films that have not yet been released

- All films are in Marathi, unless mentioned.

Year	Film	Director	Writer	Actor	Ref.
2009	Harishchandrachi Factory	No	No	Yes	
2011	Stand by	No	No	Yes	
2012	Ajinkya	No	No	Yes	
2012	Chinu	No	No	Yes	
2013	Fandry	No	No	Yes	
2013	Rege	No	Yes	Yes	
2015	Deool Band	Yes	Yes	Yes	
2016	Mr. and Mrs. Sadachari	No	Yes	No	
2018	Mulshi Pattern	Yes	Yes	Yes	
2018	Lagn Mubarak	No	No	Yes	
2018	Farzand	No	No	Yes	
2018	Me Shivaji Park	No	No	Yes	
2019	Thackeray	No	No	Yes	
2019	Sur Sapata	No	No	Yes	
2019	Wedding Cha Shinema	No	No	Yes	
2019	Triple Seat	No	No	Yes	
2019	Bandishala	No	No	Yes	
2021	Radhe (Hindi film)	No	No	Yes	
2021	Pandu	No	No	Yes	
2022	Dharmaveer	Yes	Yes	No	
2022	Sarsenapati Hambirrao	Yes	Yes	Yes	
2023	Baloch	No	No	Yes	
2023	Jaggu Ani Juliet	No	No	Yes	
2023	Chowk	No	No	Yes	
2024	Navardev Bsc. Agri.	No	No	Yes	
2024	Lockdown Lagna	No	No	Yes	
2024	Aho Vikramaarka	No	No	Yes	
2024	Dharmaveer 2	Yes	Yes	No	
2025	Sant Dnyaneshwaranchi Muktai	No	No	Yes	
2025	Gotya Gangster	No	No	Yes	
2026	Deool Band 2	Yes	Yes	Yes	
TBA	Love Sulabh †	No	No	Yes	
TBA	Vedat Marathe Veer Daudle Saat †	No	No	Yes	

=== Television ===
Year	Title	Role	Network	Ref
2008-2010	Agnihotra	Ganpat "Tatya" Baviskar	Star Pravah	
2009-2011	Kunku	Dialogue writer	Zee Marathi	
2011-2012	Pinjara	Vishnu (Actor) & Writer	Zee Marathi	
2013-2014	Tuza Maza Jamena	Dialogue Writer	Zee Marathi	
2015	Ase He Kanyadan	Dialogue Writer	Zee Marathi	

== Political career ==
Tarde is an active member of the Rashtriya Swayamsevak Sangh, since his childhood with his close friend Murlidhar Mohol.
