= Madhugandha Kulkarni =

Indian film, theatre and television personality

- Born: 25 December; Pandharpur, India
- Occupations: Actor, screenwriter
- Spouse: Paresh Mokashi

Madhugandha Kulkarni is an Indian film, theatre and television personality.

== Career ==
Madhugandha Kulkarni is an Indian actress and screenwriter. She has done good work in Marathi films. These include Harishchandrachi Factory, Taptapadi (2014), Elizabeth Ekadashi (2014) and Chi Va Chi Sau Ka (2017).

== Personal life ==
Kulkarni's childhood was spent in Pandharpur. She is married to Paresh Mokashi.

== Work ==
- Dialogue, story writer and co-producer of the film Chi Va Chi Sau Ka
- Dialogue, story writer and co-producer of the film Elizabeth Ekadashi, based on her childhood living in Pandharpur.
- Dialogue writer for the film Taptapadi.
- Screenplay co-writer for the film Chi Va Chi Sau Ka.
- Actor in film Pangira.
- Screenplay and dialogues for the television serial Chukbhul Dyavi Ghyavi.
- Actor in short film Baangdya.
- Actor in television serial Julun Yeti Reshimgathi.
- Writer of television serial Honar Soon Mi Hya Gharchi.
- Writer of plays Tya Eka Valnavar and Lagnabambal.
- Actor in plays Eka Kalajachi Goshta and Lali leela.
- Actor in television serial Tuza Maza Breakup
- Actor in Movie Nach Ga Ghuma
- Played role of Advocate Kalindi Dharmadhikari in TV series Lakhat Ek Aamcha Dada, Savalyachi Janu Savali, Paaru and Lakshmi Niwas
- Writer, producer and actor in play Lagna Panchami
