= Filmfare Award for Best Debut Director – Marathi =

Indian award for Marathi language films

Filmfare Award for Best Debut Director
- Awarded for: Best Debut Director
- Country: India
- Presented by: Filmfare
- Currently held by: Subodh Khanolkar, Dashavatar & Rohan Mapuskar, April May 99 (2024)
- Website: Filmfare winners

The Filmfare Award for Best Debut Director is given by Filmfare, an Indian film magazine, as part of its annual Filmfare Awards for Marathi Cinemas to recognise a performance by a director in their debut. Each individual entry in the following list shows the title, followed by the production company and the producer.

== List of winners ==
=== 2010s ===
- 2014 Mahesh Limaye – Yellow & Abhijit Panse – Rege
- 2015 Om Raut – Lokmanya: Ek Yugpurush & Bhaurao Karhade – Khwada
- 2016 Rajesh Mapuskar – Ventilator
- 2017 Makarand Mane – Ringan & Varun Narvekar – Muramba
  - Prasad Oak – Kachcha Limboo
  - Pushkar Shrotri – Ubuntu
  - Vishal Furia – Lapachhapi
  - Vikram Phadnis – Hrudayantar
- 2018 No Ceremony
- 2019 No Ceremony

=== 2020s ===
- 2020 Saleel Kulkarni – Wedding Cha Shinema
- 2021 Amar Deokar – Mhorkya & Naveen Deshaboina – Lata Bhagwan Kare
  - Achyut Narayan – Vegali Vaat
  - Vaibhav Khisti, Suhrud Godbole – June
  - Aditya Rathi, Gayatri Patil – Photo Prem
  - Saurabh Bhave – Bonus
- 2022 Ajit Wadikar – Y & Trushant Ingle – Zollywood
  - Pratap Phad – Ananya
  - Riteish Deshmukh – Ved
  - Sanket Mane – Mann Kasturi Re
- 2023 Devendra Gaikwad – Chowk
- 2024 Rahul Ramachandra Pawar – Khadmod & Navjyot Bandiwadekar – Gharat Ganpati
  - Adinath Kothare – Paani
  - Chhatrapal Anand Ninawe – Ghaath
  - Snehal Tarde – Phullwanti
  - Suhas Desale – Amaltash
  - Vishal Modave – Sridevi Prasanna
- 2025 Subodh Khanolkar – Dashavatar & Rohan Mapuskar – April May 99
  - Jayant Digambar Somalkar – Sthal - A Match
  - Gaurav Patki – Aarpar
  - Rohan Parashuram Kanawade – Sabar Bonda
  - Santosh Davakhar – Gondhal
  - Shivraj Waichal – Ata Thambaycha Naay!
