= Filmfare Award for Best Sound – Marathi =

Indian award for Marathi language films

Filmfare Marathi Awards for Best Sound Design
- Awarded for: Best Performance by a Sound Designer
- Country: India
- Presented by: Filmfare
- First award: Rohit Pradhan, Rege (2014)
- Currently held by: Jayant Dhakan, Gondhal (2025)
- Website: Filmfare Awards

The Filmfare Marathi Award for Best Sound Design is given by Filmfare, an Indian film magazine, as part of its annual Filmfare Awards for Marathi films.

== Winner and nominees ==
=== 2010s ===
Year	Recipient(s)	Film
2014	Rohit Pradhan	Rege
2014	Anmol Bhave	Elizabeth Ekadashi
2014	Sanjay Maurya, Allwyn Rego	Lai Bhaari
2014	Nimish Chheda, Avinash Sonawne, Christopher Harvey	Fandry
2014	Tushar Pandit	Postcard
2015	Mahavir Sabbannwar	Khwada
2016	Sanjay Maurya, Allwyn Rego	Ventilator
2016	Avinash Sonawane	Sairat
2016	Anmol Bhave	YZ
2016	Anmol Bhave	Half Ticket
2016	Rhitwick Raj Pathak, Siddharth Dubey	Kaul: A Calling
2016	Avinash Sonawane, Abhishek Nair	Phuntroo
2017	Baylon Fonseca	Manjha
2017	Kiran Dudwadkar, Rupesh Mayekar	Lapachhapi
2017	Anmol Bhave	Kaasav
2017	Manoj Mochemadkar	Gachchi
2017	Mahavir Sabbanwar	Ringan

=== 2020s ===
Year	Recipient(s)	Film
2020	Nikhil Lanjekar, Himanshu Aambekar	Fatteshikast
2020	Abhishek Nayar, Shijin Melvin Hutton	Baba
2020	Avinash Sonawane	Girlfriend
2020	Bigyna Dahal	Anandi Gopal
2020	Rohit Pradhan	Smile Please
2021	Anita Kushwaha, Naren Chandavarkar	The Disciple
2021	Abhijit Kende	Choricha Mamla
2021	Atul Lanjudkar, Ajinkya Jumale	Mhorkya
2021	Avinash Sonawane	Dhurala
2021	Debraj	Vegali Vaat
2021	Dinesh Uchhil, Shantanu Akerkar	Bhonga
2022	Anmol Bhave	Me Vasantrao
2022	Anita Kushwaha	Pondicherry
2022	Anita Kushwaha	Medium Spicy
2022	Lochan Kanvinde	Zombivli
2022	Sunil Agarwal	Panghrun
2022	Baylon Fonseca	Godavari
2023	Anmol Bhave	Ghar Banduk Biryani
2023	Anthony Ruban	Naal 2
2023	Atul Deshpande	Baipan Bhaari Deva
2023	Pranam Pansare	Unaad
2023	Shantanu Akerkar, Dinesh Uchil	Jhimma 2
2023	Shishir Chousalkar	Vaalvi
2024	Anmol Bhave	Paani
2024	Manas Mali	Amaltash
2024	Manoj M. Goswami	Ghaath
2024	Pranam Pansare	Phullwanti
2024	Roheit Chandraprabha	Khadmod
2024	Shantanu Akerkar, Dinesh Uchil	Ole Aale
2024	Shishir Chousalkar	Naach Ga Ghuma
2025	Jayant Dhakan	Gondhal
2025	Mandar Kamlapurkar	Jarann
2025	Pradyumna Chaware	Ata Thambaycha Naay!
2025	Sanjay Chaturvedi	Sthal
2025	Shishri Chousalkar, Akshay Vaidya	April May 99
2025	Shishir Chousalkar, Akshay Vaidya	Dashavatar

== See also ==
- Filmfare Awards Marathi
- Filmfare Awards
- Filmfare Award for Best Music Director – Marathi
- Filmfare Award for Best Cinematographer – Marathi
- Filmfare Award for Best Background Score – Marathi
