= Filmfare Critics Award for Best Actress – Marathi =

Indian award for Marathi language films

Filmfare Critics Award Marathi for Best Actress
- Awarded for: Best Performance by an Actress in a Leading Role - Critics
- Country: India
- Presented by: Filmfare
- First award: Usha Naik, Ek Hazarachi Note (2014)
- Currently held by: Nandini Chikte, Sthal - A Match (2025)
- Website: Filmfare Awards

The Filmfare Critics Award for Best Actress is given by the Filmfare magazine as part of its annual Filmfare Awards for Marathi Cinema.

== List of winners ==
=== 2010s ===
| Year | Photos of winners | Actress | Role | Film |
|---|---|---|---|---|
| 2014 (1st) | | Usha Naik | Budhi | Ek Hazarachi Note |
| 2015 (2nd) | | Geetanjali Kulkarni | Nutan | Court |
| 2016 (3rd) | | Vandana Gupte | Malati Sabnis | Family Katta |
| 2017 (4th) | | Iravati Harshe | Janaki | Kaasav |
| 2017 (4th) | | Pritam Kagne | Halim | Halal |
| 2017 (4th) | | Sonali Kulkarni | Shaila Katdare | Kachcha Limbo |
| 2017 (4th) | | Ashwini Bhave | Samidha | Manjha |

=== 2020s ===
| Year | Photos of winners | Actress | Role | Film |
|---|---|---|---|---|
| 2020 (5th) | | Sonalee Kulkarni | Hirkani | Hirkani |
| 2020 (5th) | | Bhagyashree Milind | Anandi Gopal Joshi | Anandi Gopal |
| 2021 (6th) | | Sonali Kulkarni | Vimal | Pension |
| 2021 (6th) | | Neena Kulkarni | Maee | Photo Prem |
| 2021 (6th) | | Anaya Phatak | Sonu | Vegli Vaat |
| 2021 (6th) | | Lata Bhagwan Kare | Lata Bhagwan Kare | Lata Bhagwan Kare |
| 2021 (6th) | | Padmini Kolhapure | Lata Inamdar | Prawaas |
| 2022 (7th) | | Sai Tamhankar | Nikita | Pondicherry |
| 2022 (7th) | | Gauri Ingawale | Laxmi | Panghrun |
| 2022 (7th) | | Hruta Durgule | Ananya | Ananya |
| 2022 (7th) | | Mukta Barve | Dr. Aarti Deshmukh | Y |
| 2022 (7th) | | Sayali Sanjeev | Indrayani | Goshta Eka Paithanichi |
| 2023 (8th) | | Rohini Hattangadi | Jaya | Baipan Bhaari Deva |
| 2023 (8th) | | Gauri Deshpande | Yashoda | Shyamchi Aai |
| 2023 (8th) | | Madhura Velankar | Megha Deshpande | Butterfly |
| 2023 (8th) | | Sonali Kulkarni | Tanvi | Sshort And Ssweet |
| 2024 (9th) | | Rajshri Deshpande | Savitribai Phule | Satyashodhak |
| 2024 (9th) | | Pallavi Paranjape | Keerthi Potdar | Amaltash |
| 2024 (9th) | | Rohini Hattangadi | Ranjana Lele | Aata Vel Zaali |
| 2024 (9th) | | Rucha Vaidya | Survana | Paani |
| 2024 (9th) | | Suruchi Adarkar | Kusari | Ghaath |
| 2024 (10th) | | Nandini Chikte | Savita | Sthal - A Match |
| 2024 (10th) | | Ishita Deshmukh | Suman | Gondhal |
| 2024 (10th) | | Renuka Shahane | Uma Bhalerao | Uttar |
| 2024 (10th) | | Rinku Rajguru | Malti | Asha |
