= Filmfare Critics Award for Best Film – Marathi =

Indian award for Marathi language films

Filmfare Critics Award Marathi for Best Film
- Awarded for: Best Film Critics
- Country: India
- Presented by: Filmfare
- Currently held by: Sabar Bonda & Sthal - A Match (2025)
- Website: Filmfare Awards

The Filmfare Critics Award for Best Film is given by Filmfare as part of its annual Filmfare Awards for Marathi Cinema. The award in this category was first presented in 2014.

== List of winners ==
=== 2010s ===
Year	Film	Recipient(s)	Ref.
2014	Elizabeth Ekadashi	Paresh Mokashi	
2014	Postcard	Gajendra Ahire	
2015	Court	Chaitanya Tamhane	
2015	Killa	Avinash Arun	
2016	Natsamrat	Mahesh Manjrekar	
2017	Halal	Shivaji Lotan Patil	
2017	Kaasav	Sumitra Bhave-Sunil Sukhtankar	
2017	Ringan	Makarand Mane	
2017	Nadi Vahate	Sandeep Sawant	
2017	Manjha	Jatin Wagle	

=== 2020s ===
Year	Film	Recipient(s)	Ref.
2020	Baba	Raj Gupta	
2021	The Disciple	Chaitanya Tamhane	
2021	Bhonga	Shivaji Lotan Patil	
2021	Photo Prem	Aditya Rathi, Gayatri Patil	
2021	Vegali Vaat	Achyut Narayan	
2021	Lata Bhagwan Kare	Naveen Deshaboina	
2021	June	Vaibhav Khisti, Suhrud Godbole	
2022	Me Vasantrao	Nipun Dharmadhikari	
2022	Y	Ajit Wadikar	
2022	Panghrun	Mahesh Manjrekar	
2022	Godavari	Nikhil Mahajan	
2022	Pondicherry	Sachin Kundalkar	
2022	Goshta Eka Paithanichi	Shantanu Ganesh Rode	
2022	Zollywood	Trushant Ingle	
2023	Baaplyok	Makarand Mane	
2023	Naal 2	Sudhakar Reddy Yakkanti	
2023	Aatmapamphlet	Ashish Avinash Bende	
2023	Shyamchi Aai	Sujay Dahake	
2023	Unaad	Aditya Sarpotdar	
2024	Amaltash	Suhas Desale	
2024	Ghaath	Chhatrapal Anand Ninawe	
2024	Aata Vel Zaali	Ananth Mahadevan	
2024	Khadmod	Rahul Ramachandra Pawar	
2024	Paani	Adinath Kothare	
2024	Satyashodhak	Nilesh Jalamkar	
2025	Sabar Bonda	Rohan Parashuram Kanawade	
2025	Sthal - A Match	Jayant Digambar Somalkar	
2025	Devmanus	Tejas Prabha Vijay Deoskar	
2025	Gondhal	Santosh Davakhar	
2025	Teen Paayancha Ghoda	Noopur Bora	
2025	Uttar	Kshitij Patwardhan	
