= Filmfare Critics Award for Best Actor – Marathi =

Indian award for Marathi language films

Filmfare Critics Award Marathi for Best Actor
- Awarded for: Best Performance by an Actor in a Leading Role
- Country: India
- Presented by: Filmfare
- First award: Mohan Agashe, Astu (2014)
- Currently held by: Taranath Khiratkar, Sthal - A Match & Bhushaan Manoj, Sabar Bonda (2025)
- Website: Filmfare Awards

The Filmfare Critics Award for Best Actor is given by Filmfare as part of its annual Filmfare Awards for Marathi Cinema. This category was first introduced in 2014.

== List of winners ==
=== 2010s ===
Year	Photos of winners	Actress	Role	Film
2014 (1st)		Mohan Agashe	Dr. Chakrapani Shastri	Astu
2015 (2nd)		Ankush Chaudhari	Amit Naik	Double Seat
2016 (3rd)		Mangesh Desai	Bhagwan Dada	Ekk Albela
2017 (4th)		Shashank Shende	Arjun Magar	Ringan
2017 (4th)		Priyadarshan Jadhav	Kaddus	Halal
2017 (4th)		Alok Rajwade	Maanav	Kaasav
2017 (4th)		Ravi Jadhav	Mohan Katdare	Kachcha Limbo
2017 (4th)		Sumedh Mudgalkar	Vikram (Vicky)	Manjha

=== 2020s ===
Year	Photos of winners	Actress	Role	Film
2020 (5th)		Lalit Prabhakar	Gopal Joshi	Anandi Gopal
2021 (6th)		Aditya Modak	Sharad Nerulkar	The Disciple
2021 (6th)		Siddharth Menon	Neel	June
2021 (6th)		Ashok Saraf	Abhijat Inamdar	Prawaas
2021 (6th)		Ruturaj Wankhede	Santya / Santosh	Jayanti
2021 (6th)		Vikram Gokhale	Chandrakant Deshpande (CD)	AB Aani CD
2022 (7th)		Jitendra Joshi	Nishikant Deshmukh	Godavari
2022 (7th)		Prasad Oak	Anand Dighe	Dharmaveer
2022 (7th)		Rahul Deshpande	Vasantrao Deshpande	Me Vasantrao
2022 (7th)		Siddharth Jadhav	Rahul Desai	Baalbhaarti
2022 (7th)		Sumeet Raghavan	Kiran	Ekda Kaay Zala
2023 (8th)		Ankush Chaudhari	Krishnarao Sable	Maharashtra Shahir
2023 (8th)		Ajay Purkar	Tanaji Malusare	Subhedar
2023 (8th)		Ashitosh Gaikwad	Shubham	Unaad
2023 (8th)		Shashank Shende	Tatya	Baaplyok
2023 (8th)		Nagraj Manjule	Inspector Raya Patil	Ghar Banduk Biryani
2023 (8th)		Om Bhutkar	Shyam / Pandurang Sadashiv Sane	Shyamchi Aai
2024 (9th)		Jitendra Joshi	ACP Nagpure	Ghaath
2024 (9th)		Adinath Kothare	Hanumant Kendre	Paani
2024 (9th)		Dilip Prabhavalkar	Shashidhar Lele	Aata Vel Zaali
2024 (9th)		Meghraj Mallinath Kalshetti	Raju	Khadmod
2024 (9th)		Rahul Deshpande	Rahul Watve	Amaltash
2024 (9th)		Sunil Barve	Sudhir Phadke	Swargandharva Sudhir Phadke
2025 (10th)		Taranath Khiratkar	Daulatrao Wandhare	Sthal - A Match
2025 (10th)		Bhushaan Manoj	Anand	Sabar Bonda
2025 (10th)		Aaryan Menghji	Krushna Kamerkar	April May 99
2025 (10th)		Abhinay Berde	Ninad Bhalerao	Uttar
2025 (10th)		Prasad Oak	Girish Mane	Gulkand
2025 (10th)		Siddharth Bodke	Chatrapati Shivaji Maharaj	Punha Shivajiraje Bhosale
