= 9th Filmfare Awards Marathi =

Indian film awards

9th Filmfare Marathi Awards
- Presented on: 10 July 2025
- Site: Hotel Sahara Star, Mumbai
- Hosted by: Siddharth Chandekar; Amey Wagh

Highlights
- Best Film: Paani
- Best Critic: Amaltash; Ghaath
- Most awards: Phullwanti
- Most nominations: Paani (17)

The 9th Filmfare Marathi Awards is a ceremony, presented by Planet Marathi, honored the best Indian Marathi-language films of 2024.

Paani led the ceremony with 17 nominations, followed by Phullwanti with 16, Gharat Ganpati with 12 and Amaltash with 11 nominations.

Phullwanti emerged as the biggest winner, taking home 7 awards, including Best Actress, Best Music Director and Best Female Playback Singer. Paani followed closely with 6 awards, including Best Film, Best Director, while Ghaath won 4 awards, notably Best Film Critics and Best Actor Critics.

Adinath Kothare received six nominations. Both he and Mahesh Manjrekar were nominated in the Best Director and Best Actor categories. Kothare won Best Director, while Manjrekar took home the Best Actor award. Each won two awards overall.

Atul Parchure and Shanta Shelke received posthumous nominations, with Shelke winning in her category.

== Ceremony ==
The 9th Filmfare Marathi Awards, honoring the best Marathi films of 2024, were held at Hotel Sahara Star in Mumbai. The event was hosted by actors Amey Wagh and Siddharth Chandekar. The ceremony saw the presence of several prominent personalities from Marathi cinema and Bollywood, including Renuka Shahane, Nawazuddin Siddiqui, Jaideep Ahlawat, Varsha Usgaonkar, Isha Koppikar, Rajkummar Rao and Tabu.

== Winners and nominees ==
The nominations were announced by Filmfare on 4 July 2025.

Best Film	Best Director
Paani; Dharmaveer 2; Gharat Ganpati; Juna Furniture; Naach Ga Ghuma; Phullwanti	Adinath Kothare – Paani; Mahesh Manjrekar – Juna Furniture; Navjyot Bandiwadekar – Gharat Ganpati; Paresh Mokashi – Naach Ga Ghuma; Pravin Tarde – Dharmaveer 2; Varun Narvekar – Ek Don Teen Chaar
Best Actor	Best Actress
Mahesh Manjrekar – Juna Furniture; Adinath Kothare – Paani; Gashmeer Mahajani – Phullwanti; Nana Patekar – Ole Aale; Prasad Oak – Dharmaveer 2; Siddharth Chandekar – Sridevi Prasanna	Prajakta Mali – Phullwanti; Vaidehi Parshurami – Ek Don Teen Chaar; Mukta Barve – Naach Ga Ghuma; Priyadarshini Indalkar – Navardev Bsc. Agri.; Sai Tamhankar – Sridevi Prasanna; Sonali Khare – Mylek
Best Supporting Actor	Best Supporting Actress
Kshitish Date – Dharmaveer 2; Ashok Saraf – Navra Maza Navsacha 2; Atul Parchure – Alibaba Aani Chalishitale Chor; Dilip Prabhavalkar – Panchak; Harish Dudhade – Navra Maza Navsacha 2; Milind Shinde – Ghaath; Siddharth Bodke – Sridevi Prasanna	Namrata Sambherao – Naach Ga Ghuma; Ashwini Bhave – Gharat Ganpati; Mrinal Kulkarni – Ek Don Teen Chaar; Nandita Patkar – Panchak; Nirmiti Sawant – Navra Maza Navsacha 2; Sulbha Arya – Sridevi Prasanna
Best Music Director	Best Lyricist
Avinash–Vishwajeet – Phullwanti; Amitraj – Sridevi Prasanna; Bhushan Mate – Amaltash; Gulraj Singh – Paani; Sanket Sane – Gharat Ganpati; Tanmay Bhide – Naach Ga Ghuma	Shanta Shelke – "Sarale Saare" – Amaltash; Dr. Prasad Biware – "Madanmanjiri" – Phullwanti; Mandar Cholkar – "Angai Song" – Ole Aale; Mandar Cholkar – "Phulpakharu" – Ole Aale; Manoj Yadav – "Naachnara" – Paani; Vaibhav Joshi – "Kay Chukle Saang Na" – Juna Furniture
Best Playback Singer – Male	Best Playback Singer – Female
Rahul Deshpande – "Sarale Saare" – Amaltash; Rahul Deshpande – "Hey Sharade" – Phullwanti; Abhay Jodhpurkar – "Navasachi Gauri Mazi" – Gharat Ganpati; Adarsh Shinde – "Naachnara" – Paani; Shankar Mahadevan – "Title Track" – Paani; Avadhoot Gupte – "Zagamaga" – Ole Aale	Vaishali Mhade – "Madanmanjiri" – Phullwanti; Aarya Ambekar – "Phullwanti Title Track" – Phullwanti; Cyli Khare – "Vasarachi Aai" – Gharat Ganpati; Priyanka Barve – "Mrugtrushna" – Hee Anokhi Gaath; Shalmali Kholgade – "Saala Character" – Alibaba Aani Chalishitale Chor; Vaishali Samant – "Naach Ga Ghuma Title Track" – Naach Ga Ghuma
Best Director Debut
Rahul Ramachandra Pawar – Khadmod; Navjyot Bandiwadekar – Gharat Ganpati; Adinath Kothare – Paani; Chhatrapal Anand Ninawe – Ghaath; Snehal Tarde – Phullwanti; Suhas Desale – Amaltash; Vishal Modave – Sridevi Prasanna
Best Actor Debut	Best Female Debut
Dhairya Gholap – Yek Number	Jui Bhagwat – Like Aani Subscribe

Critics' awards

Best Film
Suhas Desale – Amaltash; Chhatrapal Anand Ninawe – Ghaath; Ananth Mahadevan – Aata Vel Zaali; Rahul Ramachandra Pawar – Khadmod; Adinath Kothare – Paani; Nilesh Jalamkar – Satyashodhak
Best Actor	Best Actress
Jitendra Joshi – Ghaath; Adinath Kothare – Paani; Dilip Prabhavalkar – Aata Vel Zaali; Meghraj Mallinath Kalshetti – Khadmod; Rahul Deshpande – Amaltash; Sunil Barve – Swargandharva Sudhir Phadke	Rajshri Deshpande – Satyashodhak; Pallavi Paranjape – Amaltash; Rohini Hattangadi – Aata Vel Zaali; Rucha Vaidya – Paani; Suruchi Adarkar – Ghaath

Technical Awards

Best Story	Best Screenplay
Chhatrapal Anand Ninawe – Ghaath; Aditi Moghe – Sridevi Prasanna; Alok Sutar, Navjyot Bandiwadekar – Gharat Ganpati; Mahesh Manjrekar – Juna Furniture; Suhas Desale, Mayuresh Wagh – Amaltash; Vipul Mehta – Ole Aale	Nitin Dixit – Paani; Aditi Moghe – Sridevi Prasanna; Chhatrapal Anand Ninawe – Ghaath; Mahesh Manjrekar – Juna Furniture; Snehal Tarde – Phullwanti; Varun Narvekar, Nipun Dharmadhikari – Ek Don Teen Chaar
Best Dialogue	Best Editing
Mahesh Manjrekar – Juna Furniture; Aditi Moghe – Sridevi Prasanna; Chhatrapal Anand Ninawe, Vikas Mudki – Ghaath; Madhugandha Kulkarni and Paresh Mokashi – Naach Ga Ghuma; Nitin Dixit – Paani; Pravin Vitthal Tarde – Phullwanti	Mayur Hardas, Adinath Kothare – Paani; Navnita Sen – Ghaath; Ashish Mhatre – Gharat Ganpati; Jitendra K. Shah – Ole Aale; Rahul Bhatankar – Juna Furniture; Suhas Desale – Amaltash
Best Choreography	Best Cinematography
Umesh Jadhav – "Phullwanti Title Track" – Phullwanti	Mahesh Limaye – Phullwanti; Ajit Reddy – Juna Furniture; Arjun Sorte – Paani; Gulam N. S – Ole Aale; Rahul Ramachandra Pawar, Gururaj Bakshi, Akshay Ingle – Khadmod; Shelly Sharma, Prasad Bhende – Gharat Ganpati; Udit Khurana – Ghaath
Best Production Design	Best Sound Design
Eknath Kadam – Phullwanti; Mangesh Bhayde, Rushi Tambe – Amaltash; Dr. Sumeet Patil – Gharat Ganpati; Prashant Bidkar – Paani; Sampada Gejji – Ek Don Teen Chaar; Vijay Mahamulkar – Dharmarakshak Mahaveer Chhatrapati Sambhaji Maharaj	Anmol Bhave – Paani; Manas Mali – Amaltash; Manoj M. Goswami – Ghaath; Pranam Pansare – Phullwanti; Roheit Chandraprabha – Khadmod; Shantanu Akerkar, Dinesh Uchil – Ole Aale; Shishir Chousalkar – Naach Ga Ghuma
Best Background Score	Best Costume Design
Gulraj Singh – Paani; Amol Dhadphale, Johann Mathew, Bhushan Mate – Amaltash; Avinash–Vishwajeet – Dharmaveer 2; Avinash–Vishwajeet – Phullwanti; Hitesh Modak – Juna Furniture	Manasi Attarde – Phullwanti; Aparna Surve-Guram, Mahesh Sherla – Gharat Ganpati; Ganesh Lonare – Dharmarakshak Mahaveer Chhatrapati Sambhaji Maharaj; Rashmi Sawant, Manasi Attarde – Dharmaveer 2; Sachin Lovalekar – Swargandharva Sudhir Phadke; Sneha Nikam – Sridevi Prasanna

Special awards

Lifetime Achievement Award
- Usha Mangeshkar

== Superlatives ==
Multiple nominations
Nominations	Film
17	Paani
16	Phullwanti
12	Gharat Ganpati
11	Amaltash
10	Juna Furniture
10	Sridevi Prasanna
10	Ghaath
8	Naach Ga Ghuma
8	Ole Aale
6	Dharmaveer 2
5	Ek Don Teen Chaar
4	Aata Vel Zaali
3	Khadmod
3	Navra Maza Navsacha 2
2	Satyashodhak
2	Alibaba Aani Chalishitale Chor
2	Dharmarakshak Mahaveer Chhatrapati Sambhaji Maharaj
2	Panchak
2	Swargandharva Sudhir Phadke

Multiple wins
Awards	Film
7	Phullwanti
6	Paani
4	Ghaath
3	Amaltash
2	Juna Furniture
