= Amaltash =

- Theatrical release poster
- Directed by: Suhas Desale
- Screenplay by: Mayuresh Wagh; Suhas Desale
- Story by: Suhas Desale
- Produced by: Mugdha Srikant Desai; Jitendra Joshi
- Starring: Rahul Deshpande; Pallavi Paranjape; Pratibha Padhye; Deepti Mate; Trisha Kunte
- Cinematography: Rushi Tambe
- Music by: Bhushan Mate
- Production companies: Darshan Productions; Medium Strong Productions; One Fine Day
- Distributed by: August Entertainment
- Release date: 8 March 2024
- Running time: 113 minutes
- Country: India
- Language: Marathi

Amaltash is a 2024 Indian Marathi-language musical drama film written and directed by Suhas Desale, from a screenplay by co-writer Mayuresh Wagh. It stars Rahul Deshpande, Pallavi Paranjape, Pratibha Padhye, Deepti Mate, and Trisha Kunte. It is produced by Darshan Productions Pvt. Ltd., Medium Strong Productions and One Fine Day.

The film was theatrically released on 8 March 2024 throughout Maharashtra, open with positive response from critics, praising several aspects of the film, including its refreshing and heartfelt cinematic experience, portrayal of sibling dynamics, acting, music, cinematography, and authentic portrayal of characters connected to music.

== Plot ==
Rahul, a retired pianist residing in Pune, finds his quiet existence disrupted when Keerthi, an NRI, becomes fascinated by his exceptional Absolute Pitch.

== Cast ==
- Rahul Deshpande as Rahul Watve
- Pallavi Paranjape as Keerthi Potdar
- Pratibha Padhye as Ajju, Keerthi's grandmother
- Deepti Mate as Deepti
- Trisha Kunte as Dimple
- Bhushan Marathe as Pawan
- Jacob Panicker as Oak
- Sudhir Phatak as Dr. Deshmukh
- Anil Khopkar as Ramesh
- Sunil Janeja as Old man
- Mayuresh Wagh as Ganu
- Swapnil Patil as Anaesthetist
- Raghunandan Kulkarni as Amol
- Bhushan Mate as Lic
- Sagar Karpe as Barkya
- Sandhya Bade as Assistant doctor

== Production ==
Suhas Desale said that once the decision to create a film is made, the team typically spends the next 2 months crafting the script. Following this, they delve into pre-production, a phase that typically lasts between 4–6 months. Shooting commences 6 months thereafter. Following these initial stages, a month-long break ensues to accommodate jamming sessions integral to the film. During this hiatus, all musicians convene to perform together, with their live performances being recorded. Subsequently, shooting resumes to capture the remaining segments of the film. Post-production, including editing, extends over a year. Additionally, the team opted to shoot the songs in authentic locations for added realism, forgoing the use of playback for the musical sequences.

The major part of the film was shot in Pune, Maharashtra.

== Release ==
The film was theatrically released on 8 March 2024.

== Critical reception ==
Kalpeshraj Kubal of Maharashtra Times awarded 3.5 stars out of 5 stars and believes that Amaltash offers a refreshing and heartfelt cinematic experience, urging viewers to embrace life's uncertainties and continue moving forward. Mihir Bhanage of The Times of India rated 3 stars out of 5 stars and wrote "Amaltash is like breeze of freshness that makes you pause, breathe in, process and move on. Despite its flaws, the film manages to put a smile on your face." Santosh Bhingarde of Sakal praised various aspects of the film, including the dialogue, acting, music, cinematography, and overall plot. She specifically highlight Deepti Mate's performance, the portrayal of sibling dynamics, the music composed by Bhushan Mate, and the quality of cinematography. Reshma Raikwar of Loksatta praised the film for its authentic portrayal of characters who are deeply connected to music, both in their roles and in real life. She highlight the seamless integration of music into the storytelling, creating a genuine and immersive experience for the audience.

== Awards ==
Amaltash won six awards from twenty nominations.

Award	Year	Category	Recipient(s)	Result	Ref.
Zee Chitra Gaurav Puraskar	2025	Best Film	Darshan Productions, Medium Strong Productions, One Fine Day	Nominated	
Zee Chitra Gaurav Puraskar	2025	Best Director	Suhas Desale	Nominated	
Zee Chitra Gaurav Puraskar	2025	Best Actress	Pallavi Paranjape	Nominated	
Zee Chitra Gaurav Puraskar	2025	Best Music Director	Bhushan Mate	Nominated	
Zee Chitra Gaurav Puraskar	2025	Best Playback Singer – Male	Rahul Deshpande	Won	
Zee Chitra Gaurav Puraskar	2025	Best Playback Singer – Female	Deepti Mate	Nominated	
MaTa Sanman	2025	Best Music Director (Note: Shared with Gulraj Singh for Paani.)	Bhushan Mate	Won	
MaTa Sanman	2025	Best Playback Singer – Male	Rahul Deshpande ("Sarale Saare")	Won	
Filmfare Awards Marathi	2025	Best Film (Critics) (Note: Shared with Ghaath.)	Suhas Desale	Won	
Filmfare Awards Marathi	2025	Best Debut Director	Suhas Desale	Nominated	
Filmfare Awards Marathi	2025	Best Story	Suhas Desale, Mayuresh Wagh	Nominated	
Filmfare Awards Marathi	2025	Best Actor (Critics)	Rahul Deshpande	Nominated	
Filmfare Awards Marathi	2025	Best Actress (Critics)	Pallavi Paranjape	Nominated	
Filmfare Awards Marathi	2025	Best Music Director	Bhushan Mate	Nominated	
Filmfare Awards Marathi	2025	Best Lyricist	Shanta Shelke ("Sarale Saare")	Won	
Filmfare Awards Marathi	2025	Best Playback Singer – Male	Rahul Deshpande ("Sarale Saare")	Won	
Filmfare Awards Marathi	2025	Best Background Score	Amol Dhadphale, Johann Mathew, Bhushan Mate	Nominated	
Filmfare Awards Marathi	2025	Best Editing	Suhas Desale	Nominated	
Filmfare Awards Marathi	2025	Best Production Design	Mangesh Bhayde, Rushi Tambe	Nominated	
Filmfare Awards Marathi	2025	Best Sound Design	Manas Mali	Nominated	

== Soundtrack ==
Track listing
No.	Title	Lyrics	Music	Musician (s)	Length
1.	"Trusha"	Mayuresh Wagh	Bhushan Mate	Johann Mathew (Keyboards, Guitar), Madhur Hatiskar (Drums)	3:41
2.	"Sare (Unplugged)"	Shanta Shelke	Bhushan Mate	Shon Pinto (Acoustic & Electric Guitars)
3.	"Trusha (Female version)"	Mayuresh Wagh	Bhushan Mate	Kamalesh Bhadkamkar (Keyboards), Anupam Ghatak (Percussion), Manish Kulkarni (Acoustic & Bass Guitars), Navil Fransco	3:20
4.	"You Liberate Me"	Pallavi Paranjpe	Rahul Deshpande	–	4:05
5.	"Lori"	Mayuresh Wagh	Bhushan Mate	Kamalesh Bhadkamkar (Keyboards), Varad Kathapurkar (Flute), Anupam Ghatak (Percussion), Manish Kulkarni (Acoustic & Bass Guitars)	3:54
6.	"Sarale Sare"	Shanta Shelke	Bhushan Mate	Kamalesh Bhadkamkar (Keyboards), Varad Kathapurkar (Flute), Vinayak Netke (Tabla), Anupam Ghatak (Percussion), Manish Kulkarni (Acoustic & Bass Guitars), Rahul Deo (Acoustic Guitar)	2:57
7.	"Amaltash Theme"	–	Amol Dhadphale, Bhushan Mate, Johann Mathew	–	4:05
8.	"Sarale Sare (ft. Atul Raninga)"	Shanta Shelke	Bhushan Mate	Atul Raninga (Piano)	3:22
9.	"Sing Along"	Mayuresh Wagh	Bhushan Mate	Kamalesh Bhadkamkar (Keyboards), Anupam Ghatak (Percussion), Manish Kulkarni (Acoustic & Bass Guitars), Deepak Sinha (Nylon String Guitar), I. D. Rao (Sexaphone)	2:24
10.	"I Feed Like My Farm"	Mayuresh Wagh	Bhushan Mate	Kamalesh Bhadkamkar (Keyboards), Anupam Ghatak (Percussion), Manish Kulkarni (Acoustic & Bass Guitars), Deepak Sinha (Nylon String Guitar), I. D. Rao (Sexaphone)	1:01
Total length:					37:35
