= Filmfare Award for Best Lyricist – Marathi =

Indian award for Marathi language films

Filmfare Award Marathi for Best Lyricist
- Awarded for: Best Performance by a Lyricist
- Country: India
- Presented by: Filmfare
- First award: Guru Thakur, Lai Bhaari "Maauli Maauli" (2014)
- Currently held by: Manoj Yadav, Ata Thambaycha Naay! "Title Track" (2025)
- Website: Filmfare Awards

The Filmfare Best Lyricist Award is given by the Filmfare magazine as part of its annual Filmfare Awards for Marathi Cinema to the best lyricist of a soundtrack. The award in this category was first presented in 2014. Guru Thakur was the first recipient of this award for his song "Maauli Maauli" from the film Lai Bhaari. Each individual entry shows the title followed by the production company and the producer.

== List of winners and nominees ==
=== 2010s ===
- 2014 Guru Thakur – "Maauli Maauli" – Lai Bhaari
  - Guru Thakur – "Mala Ved Lagale" – Timepass
  - Paresh Mokashi – "Dagad" – Elizabeth Ekadashi
  - Dasu Vaidya – "Mani Achanak" – Dusari Goshta
  - Prakash Holkar – "Don Disachi Sawli" – Tapaal
  - Sudhir Moghe – "Swapani Navhate Disale" – Rama Madhav
- 2015 Mangesh Kangane – "Sur Niragas Ho" from Katyar Kaljat Ghusali
  - Avadhoot Gupte – "Deva Tuzya" from Ek Tara
  - Kshitij Patwardhan – "Man Dhaga Dhaga" from Dagadi Chawl
  - Kshitij Patwardhan – "Ritya Sarya Disha" from Double Seat
  - Spruha Joshi – "Kiti Sangaychay Mala" from Double Seat
  - Ashwini Shende – "Saavar Re" from Mitwaa
- 2016 Ajay-Atul – "Yad Lagla" – Sairat
  - Kshitij Patwardhan – "Rubaab Pahije" – Half Ticket
  - Mandar Cholkar – "Ti Swapnatalya Pari Sarkhi" – Phuntroo
  - Omkar Kulkarni – "Golu Polu" – Vazandar
  - Manoj Yadav – "Baba" – Ventilator
  - Vaibhav Joshi – "Rakhumai" – Poshter Girl
- 2017 Sandeep Khare – "Maze Aai Baba " – Kachcha Limboo
  - Sayed Akhtar & Subodh Pawar – "Maula Mere Maula" – Halal
  - Vaibhav Joshi– "Muramba" – Muramba
  - Sanjay Jamkhandi – "Bhetali Tu Punha" – Bhetali Tu Punha
  - Dasu Vaidya – "Vitthala" – Ringan
  - Vaibhav Deshmukh – "Dev Pahila" – Ringan

=== 2020s ===
- 2020 Kshitij Patwardhan – "Tula Japnar Aahe" – Khari Biscuit
  - Ashwini Shende – "Kay Tu" – Triple Seat
  - Sanjay Patil – "Jagna He Nyaara" – Hirkani
  - Mangesh Kangane – "Haluvar Hak Tu" – Baba
  - Kshitij Patwardhan – "Kode Sope Thode" – Girlfriend
  - Vaibhav Joshi – "Anand Ghana" – Anandi Gopal
- 2021 Guru Thakur – "Kona Maga Bhir Bhirta" – Preetam
  - Avadhoot Gupte – "Bhurum Bhurum" – Pandu
  - Kshitij Patwardhan – "Alvida" – Jhimma
  - Mandar Cholkar – "Manacha Pakharu" – Darling
  - Mangesh Kangane– "Phul Jhulyatla Yelicha" – Basta
- 2022 Vaibhav Joshi – "Kaivalyagaan" – Me Vasantrao
  - Ajay-Atul – "Sukh Kalale" – Ved
  - Guru Thakur, Ajay-Atul – "Bai Ga" – Chandramukhi
  - Jitendra Joshi – "Khal Khal Goda" – Godavari
  - Mangesh Kangane – "Anand Harapla" – Dharmaveer
  - Vaibhav Joshi – "Hi Anokhi Gath" – Panghrun
- 2023 Guru Thakur – "Kshan Kaalche" – Unaad
  - Guru Thakur – "Umgaya Baap Ra" – Baaplyok
  - Kshitij Patwardhan – "Rang Jarasa Ola" – Jhimma 2
  - Aditi Dravid – "Mangalagaur" – Baipan Bhaari Deva
  - Valay Mulgund – "Baipan Bhaari Deva" – Baipan Bhaari Deva
  - Vaibhav Deshmukh – "Aha Hero" – Ghar Banduk Biryani
- 2024 Shanta Shelke – "Sarale Saare" – Amaltash
  - Dr. Prasad Biware – "Madanmanjiri" – Phullwanti
  - Mandar Cholkar – "Angai Song" – Ole Aale
  - Mandar Cholkar – "Phulpakharu" – Ole Aale
  - Manoj Yadav – "Naachnara" – Paani
  - Vaibhav Joshi – "Kay Chukle Saang Na" – Juna Furniture
- 2025 Manoj Yadav – "Title Track" – Ata Thambaycha Naay!
  - Guru Thakur – "Rangpooja" – Dashavatar
  - Jayant Somalkar – "Pahune Yet Aahe Pori" – Sthal - A Match
  - Jitendra Joshi – "Title Track" – Aarpar
  - Kshitij Patwardhan – "Asen Mi" – Uttar
  - Kshitij Patwardhan – "Dis Sarale" – Fussclass Dabhade
