= 2nd Filmfare Awards Marathi =

Indian film awards

2nd Filmfare Marathi Awards
- Presented on: 27 November 2016
- Organized by: Karrm

Highlights
- Best Film: Katyar Kaljat Ghusali
- Best Critic: Court; Killa
- Most awards: Katyar Kaljat Ghusali (8)
- Most nominations: Double Seat (11)

The 2nd Filmfare Marathi Awards is a ceremony, presented by Karrm, honored the best Indian Marathi-language films of 2015.

Double Seat led the ceremony with 11 nominations, followed by Katyar Kaljat Ghusali with 10 nominations.

Katyar Kaljat Ghusali dominated with 8 wins, including Best Film, Best Director, Best Actor, Best Music Director and Best Male Playback Singer, and followed by Court with 4 wins.

== Ceremony ==
It was held at Film City, Goregaon, the 2nd Filmfare Marathi Awards honored the films released in 2015. At a press conference helmed by editor of Filmfare magazine, Karrm was revealed as the title sponsor. Actors Sonalee Kulkarni, Mrunmayee Deshpande, Amruta Khanvilkar, Shibani Dandekar, Pooja Sawant, Avadhoot Gupte and Ganesh Acharya performed during the event. Bollywood actors Alia Bhatt, Anil Kapoor, Sushant Singh Rajput, Vivek Oberoi and Sonali Bendre were also present at the event. It took place on 27 November 2016.

== Winners and nominees ==
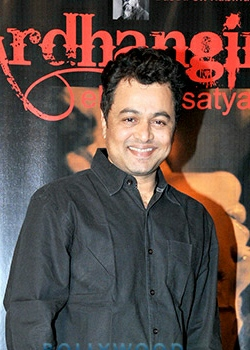
Subodh Bhave – Best Director

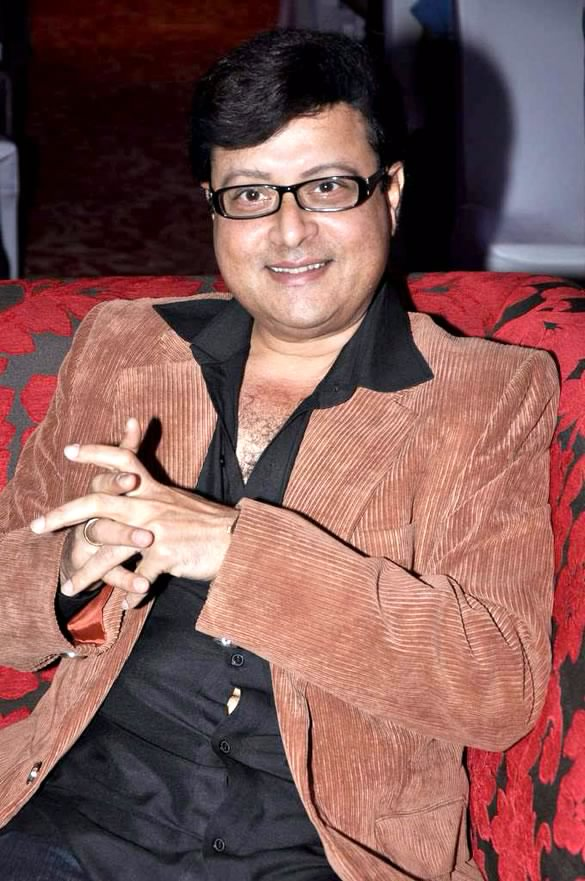
Sachin Pilgaonkar – Best Actor

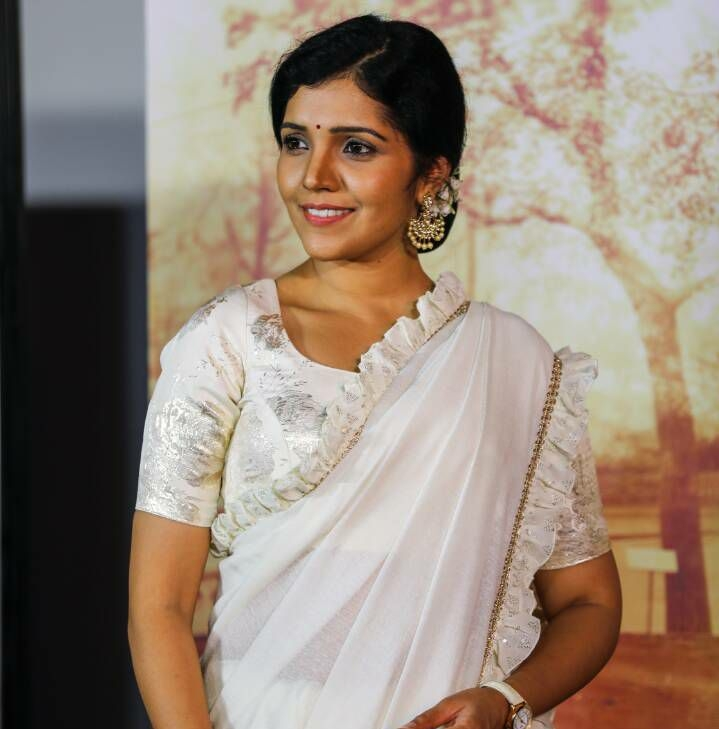
Mukta Barve – Best Actress

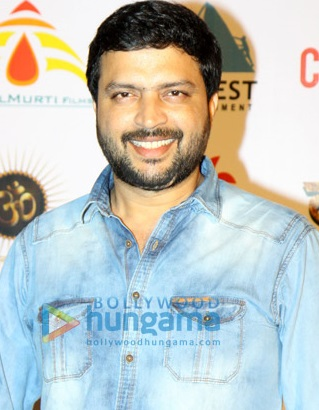
Ankush Chaudhari – Best Actor

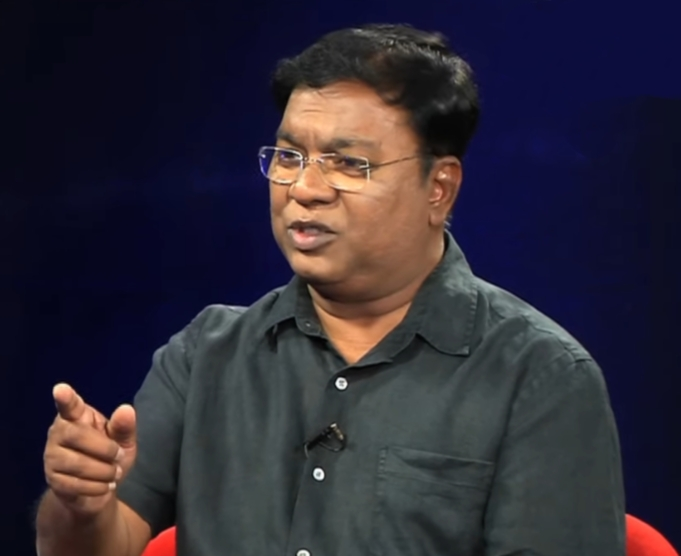
Kishor Kadam – Best Supporting Actor

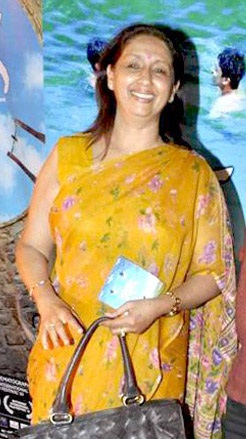
Neena Kulkarni – Best Supporting Actress

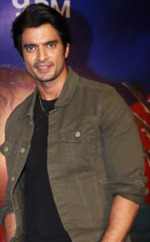
Gashmeer Mahajani – Best Male Debut

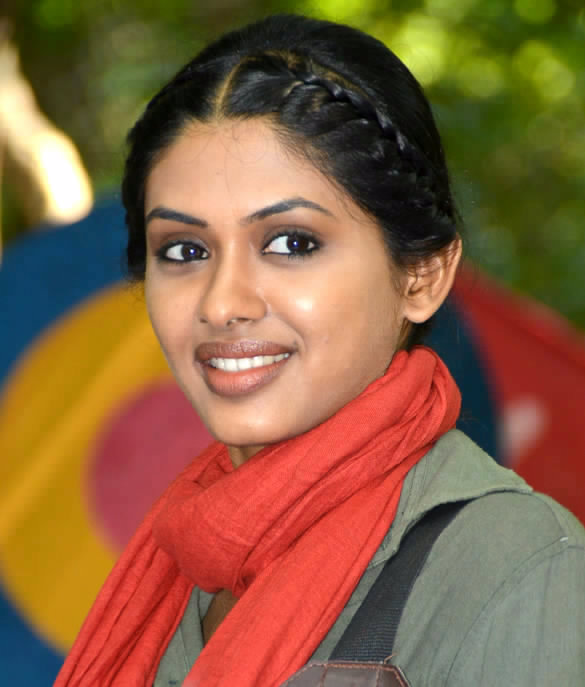
Anjali Patil – Best Female Debut

Best Film	Best Director
Katyar Kaljat Ghusali; Court; Killa; Lokmanya: Ek Yugpurush; Double Seat; Mumbai-Pune-Mumbai 2	Subodh Bhave – Katyar Kaljat Ghusali; Avinash Arun – Killa; Om Raut – Lokmanya: Ek Yugpurush; Chaitanya Tamhane – Court; Sameer Vidwans – Double Seat; Satish Rajwade – Mumbai-Pune-Mumbai 2
Best Actor	Best Actress
Sachin Pilgaonkar – Katyar Kaljat Ghusali as Khansaheb Aftab Hussain Bareliwale; Ankush Chaudhari – Double Seat as Amit Naik; Subodh Bhave – Lokmanya: Ek Yugpurush as Bal Gangadhar Tilak; Swapnil Joshi – Mumbai-Pune-Mumbai 2 as Gautam Pradhan; Sumeet Raghavan – Sandook as Vamanrao Ashtaputre; Sachin Khedekar – Nagrik as Shyam Jagdale	Mukta Barve – Double Seat as Manjiri Naik; Mukta Barve – Mumbai-Pune-Mumbai 2 as Gauri Deshpande; Sonalee Kulkarni – Mitwaa as Nandini; Amruta Subhash – Killa as Aruna Kale; Geetanjali Kulkarni – Court as Nutan
Best Supporting Actor	Best Supporting Actress
Kishor Kadam – Partu; Chinmay Mandlekar – Lokmanya: Ek Yugpurush as Makarand; Makarand Deshpande – Dagadi Chawl as Daddy; Mohan Joshi – Deool Band as Swami Samartha; Pradeep Joshi – Court as Judge Sadavarte; Vidyadhar Joshi – Double Seat as Amit's father	Neena Kulkarni – Bioscope; Amruta Khanvilkar– Katyar Kaljat Ghusali as Zareena; Prarthana Behere – Mitwaa as Avani; Sai Tamhankar – Classmates as Appu; Smita Tambe – Partu; Anjali Patil – The Silence as Maami
Best Male Debut	Best Female Debut
Gashmeer Mahajani – Deool Band, Carry On Maratha	Anjali Patil – The Silence as Maami
Best Music Director	Best Lyricist
Pt. Jitendra Abhisheki, Shankar-Ehsaan-Loy – Katyar Kaljat Ghusali; Avinash-Vishwajeet – Mumbai-Pune-Mumbai 2; Shankar-Ehsaan-Loy, Pankaj Padghan, Nilesh Mohrir – Mitwaa; Hrishikesh-Saurabh-Jasraj – Deool Band; Chinar–Mahesh – Timepass 2	Mangesh Kangane – "Sur Niragas Ho" – Katyar Kaljat Ghusali; Avdhoot Gupte – "Deva Tujya" – Ek Tara; Kshitij Patwardhan – "Man Dhaaga Dhaaga" – Dagadi Chawl; Ashwini Shende – "Savar Re" – Mitwaa; Kshitij Patwardhan – "Ritya Sarya Disha" – Double Seat; Spruha Joshi – "Kiti Sangaycha Mala" – Double Seat
Best Playback Singer – Male	Best Playback Singer – Female
Shankar Mahadevan – "Sur Niragas Ho" – Katyar Kaljat Ghusali; Mahesh Kale – "Aruni Kirani" – Katyar Kaljat Ghusali; Harshavardhan Wavare – "Roz Mala Visrun Mee" – Classmates; Hrishikesh Ranade – "Ritya Sarya Disha" – Double Seat; Jasraj Joshi – "Kiti Sangaycha Mala" – Double Seat; Swapnil Bandodkar – "Savar Re Mala" – Mitwaa	Aanandi Joshi – "Kiti Sangaychay Mala" –Double Seat; Anandi Joshi – "Man Dhaaga Dhaaga" – Dagadi Chawl; Bela Shende – "Roz Mala Visrun Mee" – Classmates; Bela Shende – "Saadh Hi Preetechi" – Mumbai-Pune-Mumbai 2; Janhvi Prabhu Arora – "Savar Re Mala" – Mitwaa

Critics' awards

Best Film
Chaitanya Tamhane – Court; Avinash Arun – Killa
Best Actor	Best Actress
Ankush Chaudhari – Double Seat as Amit Naik	Geetanjali Kulkarni – Court as Nutan

Technical Awards

Best Story	Best Screenplay
Nitin S Adsul – Partu	Ashwini Sidwani, Gajendra Ahire – The Silence
Best Dialogue	Best Editing
Chaitanya Tamhane – Court	Rikhav Desai – Court
Best Choreography	Best Cinematography
Umesh Jadhav – "Dhanak Dhanak" – Urfi	Avinash Arun – Killa
Best Production Design	Best Sound Design
Santosh Phutane – Katyar Kaljat Ghusali	Mahavir Sabbannwar – Khwada
Best Background Score
Santosh Mulekar – Katyar Kaljat Ghusali

Special awards

Best Debut Director
- Bhaurao Karhade – Khwada
- Om Raut – Lokmanya: Ek Yug Purush

== Superlatives ==
Multiple wins
Awards	Film
8	Katyar Kaljat Ghusali
4	Court
3	Double Seat
2	Partu
2	The Silence
2	Killa
2	Khwada
