= 6th Filmfare Awards Marathi =

Indian film awards

6th Filmfare Marathi Awards
- Presented on: 31 March 2022
- Site: St. Andrews, Mumbai
- Hosted by: Siddhartha Jadhav, Amey Wagh
- Organized by: Planet Marathi

Highlights
- Best Film: Jhimma, Karkhanisanchi Waari
- Best Critic: The Disciple; Bhonga
- Most awards: Dhurala (7)
- Most nominations: Dhurala (16)

Television coverage
- Network: Zee Marathi

The 6th Filmfare Marathi Awards is a ceremony presented by Planet Marathi that honored the best Indian Marathi-language films of 2021.

Dhurala led the ceremony with 16 nominations, followed by Jhimma with 11 nominations, Mhorkya with 10 nominations each.

Dhurala earned 7 awards, including Best Actor, Best Actress, Best Supporting Actor and Best Supporting Actress, thus becoming the most-awarded film at the ceremony.

Sonali Kulkarni received dual nominations for Best Actress and Best Actress (Critics) for a single film Pension, winning for Critics choice. Sonalee Kulkarni received dual nominations for Best Actress and Best Supporting Actress for her performances in Pandu and Dhurala respectively, winning for Dhurala.

== Ceremony ==
Held at St. Andrews Auditorium, Bandra, on 31 March 2022, the 6th Filmfare Marathi Awards honored the films released in 2021. A press conference helmed by editor of Filmfare magazine revealed Planet Marathi as the title sponsor. Actors Amey Wagh and Siddhartha Jadhav were announced as the co-hosts, while actors Vaibhav Tatwawadi, Pushkar Jog, Sonalee Kulkarni, Pooja Sawant, Manasi Naik and Mrunmayee Deshpande performed during the event.

== Winners and nominees ==
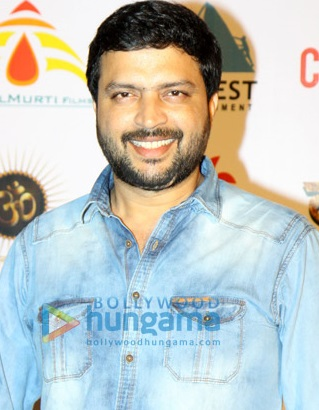
Ankush Chaudhari – Best Actor

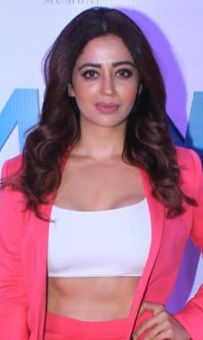
Neha Pendse – Best Actress

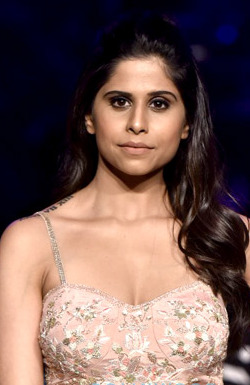
Sai Tamhankar – Best Actress

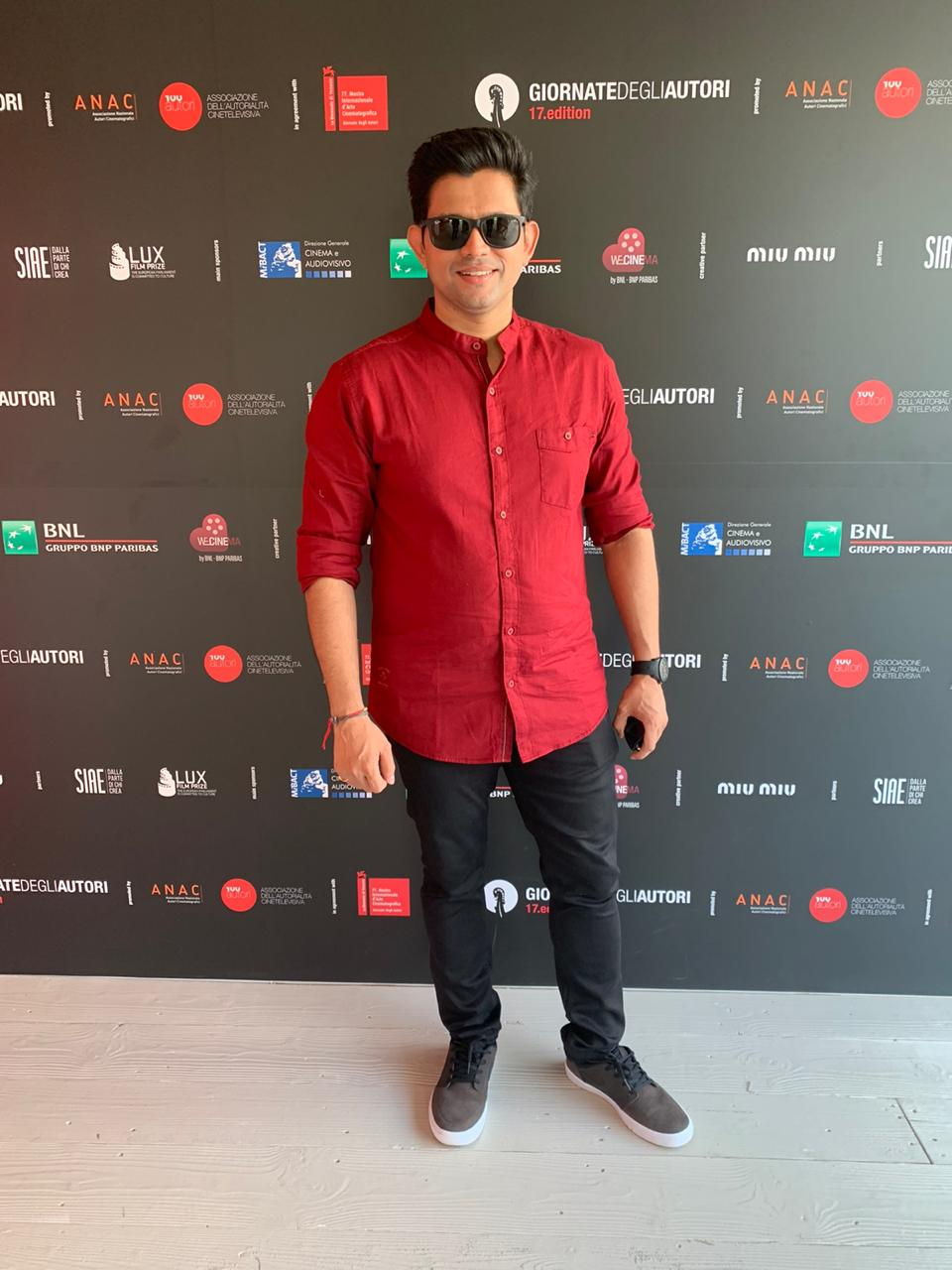
Aditya Modak – Best Actor Critics

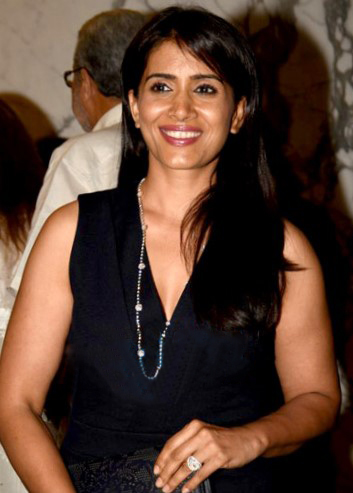
Sonali Kulkarni – Best Actress Critics

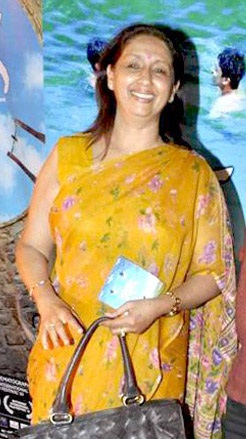
Neena Kulkarni – Best Actress Critics

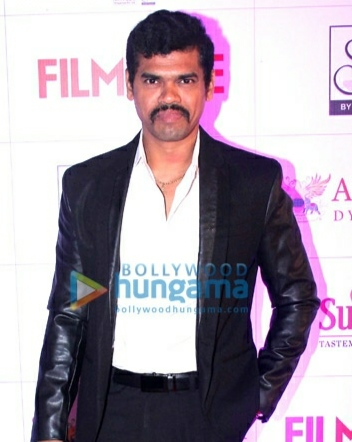
Siddharth Jadhav – Best Supporting Actress

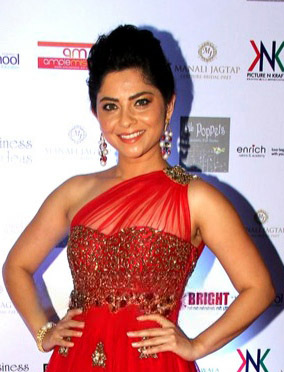
Sonalee Kulkarni – Best Supporting Actress

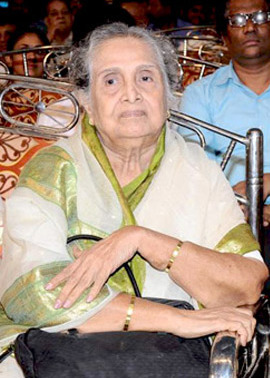
Sulochana Latkar – Lifetime Achievement Award

Best Film	Best Director
Jhimma; Karkhanisanchi Waari; Dhurala; Basta; Jayanti; Vegali Vaat	Mangesh Joshi – Karkhanisanchi Waari; Achyut Narayan – Vegali Vaat; Hemant Dhome – Jhimma; Sameer Vidhwans – Dhurala; Shailesh Narwade – Jayanti; Tanaji Ghadge – Basta
Best Actor	Best Actress
Ankush Chaudhari – Dhurala as Navnath Ubhe (Dada); Bhau Kadam – Pandu as Pandu; Gashmeer Mahajani – Bonus as Aditya Deodhar; Jitendra Joshi – Choricha Mamla as Nandan; Pranav Raorane – Preetam as Preetam; Swapnil Joshi – Bali as Shrikant Sathe	Neha Pendse – June as Neha; Sai Tamhankar – Dhurala as Harshada Ubhe; Anaya Phatak – Vagali Vaat as Sonu; Sayali Sanjeev – Basta as Swati Pawar; Sonalee Kulkarni – Pandu as Usha; Sonali Kulkarni – Pension as Vimal
Best Supporting Actor	Best Supporting Actress
Siddharth Jadhav – Dhurala as Hanumantha Ubhe; Amey Wagh – Karkhanisanchi Waari as Om Karkhanis; Arun Dravid – The Disciple as Guruji; Hemant Dhome – Choricha Mamla as Amarjit Patil; Kushal Badrike – Pandu as Mahadu Havaldar; Mangesh Kadam – Darling as Babli's Father; Shripad Joshi – Bhonga as Bangi	Geetanjali Kulkarni – Karkhanisanchi Waari; Sonalee Kulkarni – Dhurala as Monica Ubhe; Alka Kubal – Dhurala as Jyoti Tai Ubhe (Akka); Kshitee Jog – Choricha Mamla as Anjali Patil; Nirmiti Sawant – Jhimma as Nirmala Konde-Patil; Suhas Joshi – Jhimma as Indumati Karnik (Indu)
Best Male Debut	Best Female Debut
Ruturaj Wankhede – Jayanti as Santya / Santosh; Virat Madake – Kesari as Balram Jadhav	Resham Shrivardhan – June as Nicky
Best Music Director	Best Lyricist
Amitraj – Jhimma; AV Prafullachandra – Dhurala; AV Prafullachandra – Karkhanisanchi Waari; Avdhoot Gupte – Pandu; Chinar–Mahesh – Darling; Chinar–Mahesh and Swapnil-Prafull – Choricha Mamla	Guru Thakur – "Kona Maga Bhir Bhirata" – Preetam; Avdhoot Gupte – "Bhurum Bhurum" – Pandu; Kshitij Patwardhan – "Alvida" – Jhimma; Mandar Cholkar – "Manacha Pakharu" – Darling; Mangesh Kangane – "Phul Jhulatya Yelicha" – Basta
Best Playback Singer – Male	Best Playback Singer – Female
Adarsh Shinde – "Rada Dhurala" – Dhurala; Abhay Jodhpurkar – "Kona Maga Bhir Bhirata" – Preetam; Adarsh Shinde – "Jaanata Raja" – Pandu; Mohan Kanna – "Tu Chal Ra Mana" – Kesari; Pravin Kumar – "Basta Bandhala" – Basta	Apeksha Dandekar – "Maze Gaon" – Jhimma; Devaki Pandit – "Jeevanacha Sohala" – AB Aani CD; Shreya Ghoshal – "Navasa Ishara" – Bonus; Vaishali Samant – "Bhurum Bhurum" – Pandu; Yashita Sharma – "Mann Fakhiraa" – Mann Fakhira

Critics' awards

Best Film
Chaitanya Tamhane – The Disciple; Shivaji Patil – Bhonga; Vaibhav Khisti, Suhrud Godbole – June; Naveen Deshaboina – Lata Bhagwan Kare; Achyut Narayan – Vegali Vaat; Aditya Rathi, Gayatri Patil – Photo Prem
Best Actor	Best Actress
Aditya Modak – The Disciple as Sharad Nerulkar; Siddharth Menon – June as Neel; Ashok Saraf – Prawaas as Abhijat Inamdar; Ruturaj Wankhede – Jayanti as Santya / Santosh; Vikram Gokhale – AB Aani CD as Chandrakant Deshpande (CD)	Sonali Kulkarni – Pension as Vimal; Neena Kulkarni – Photo Prem as Maee; Anaya Phatak – Vegli Vaat as Sonu; Lata Bhagwan Kare – Lata Bhagwan Kare as Lata Bhagwan Kare; Padmini Kolhapure – Prawaas as Lata Inamdar

Technical Awards

Best Story	Best Screenplay
Achyut Narayan – Vegali Vaat; Amar Deokar – Mhorkya; Chaitanya Tamhane – The Disciple; Hemant Dhome – Jhimma; Kshitij Patwardhan – Dhurala; Shivaji Patil – Bhonga	Chaitanya Tamhane – The Disciple; Amar Deokar – Mhorkya; Arvind Jagtap – Basta; Irawati Karnik – Jhimma; Shailesh Narwade – Jayanti; Shivaji Patil, D Nishant – Bhonga
Best Dialogue	Best Editing
Iravati Karnik – Jhimma; Kshitij Patwardhan – Dhurala; Amar Deokar – Mhorkya; Nikhil Mahajan – June; Prasad Namjoshi – Photo Prem; Shailesh Narwade – Jayanti	Abhijit Deshpande, Sourabh Prabhudesai – Bali; Chaitanya Tamhane – The Disciple; Devendra Murdeshwar – Bonus; Faisal-Imran – Dhurala; Nilesh Meena Rasal, Saumitra Dharasuurkar – Mhorkya; Suchitra Sathe – Karkhanisanchi Waari
Best Background Score	Best Cinematography
AV Prafullachandra – Dhurala; Aditya Bedekar – Jhimma; Aditya Bedekar, Rohit Nagbhide – Mhorkya; Honey Satamkar – Bhonga; Ranjan Patnaik, Brianca Bora – Bali; Sarang Kulkarni – Karkhanisanchi Waari	Michał Sobociński – The Disciple; Akash Agarwal – Dhurala; Archana Borhade – Karkhanisanchi Waari; Girish Jambhalikar – Mhorkya; Kedar Phadke – Photo Prem; Shakil Khan – Vegali Vaat
Best Production Design	Best Sound Design
Pooja Talreja, Ravin D Karde – The Disciple; Abhishek Redkar – Bonus; Atul Lokhande – Mhorkya; Macchindra Shinde – Bali; Nilesh Wagh – Dhurala; Sagar Gaikwad – Karkhanisanchi Waari	Anita Kushwaha, Naren Chandavarkar – The Disciple; Abijit Kende – Choricha Mamla; Atul Lanjudkar, Ajinkya Jumale – Mhorkya; Avinash Sonawane – Dhurala; Debraj – Vegali Vaat; Dinesh Uchhil, Shantanu Akerkar – Bhonga

Special awards

Lifetime Achievement Award
- Sulochana Latkar
Best Debut Director
- Amar Bharat Deokar – Mhorkya
- Naveen Deshaboina – Lata Bhagwan Kare
  - Achyut Narayan – Vegali Vaat
  - Vaibhav Khisti, Suhrud Godbole – June
  - Aditya Rathi, Gayatri Patil – Photo Prem
  - Saurabh Bhave – Bonus
Best Child Artist
- Raman Deokar – Mhorkya as Akshya

== Superlatives ==
Multiple nominations
Nominations	Film
16	Dhurala
11	Jhimma
10	Mhorkya
9	Karkhanisanchi Waari
9	Vegali Vaat
9	The Disciple
7	Pandu
6	Basta
6	Jayanti
6	June
6	Bhonga
5	Bonus
5	Choricha Mamla
5	Photo Prem
4	Bali
3	Preetam
3	Darling
3	Lata Bhagwan Kare

Multiple wins
Awards	Film
7	Dhurala
6	The Disciple
4	Jhimma
3	Karkhanisanchi Waari
2	June
2	Mhorkya
