= 3rd Filmfare Awards Marathi =

Indian film awards

3rd Filmfare Marathi Awards
- Presented on: 27 October 2017
- Site: Bombay Convention & Exhibition Centre, Mumbai
- Hosted by: Pushkar Shrotri, Pushkaraj Chirputkar
- Organized by: Jio

Highlights
- Best Film: Sairat
- Best Critic: Natsamrat
- Most awards: Sairat (11)
- Most nominations: Sairat (22)

Television coverage
- Network: Colors Marathi

The 3rd Filmfare Marathi Awards is a ceremony, presented by Jio, honored the best Indian Marathi-language films of 2016.

Sairat led the ceremony with 22 nominations, followed by Ventilator with 16 nominations and Natsamrat with 13 nominations.

Sairat won a record 11 awards, the most awards for a single film in a year, including Best Film, Best Director (for Nagraj Manjule), Best Actress and Best Female Debut (both for Rinku Rajguru), Best Male Debut (for Akash Tosar) and Best Music Director (for Ajay-Atul).

Rinku Rajguru set an unmatched record of Filmfare, becoming the only actress to win both Best Actress and Best Debut Female for her performance in Sairat. Jitendra Joshi received dual nominations for Best Actor and Best Supporting Actor for his performance in Ventilator and Poshter Girl respectively. Sai Tamhankar earned dual nominations for Best Actress and Best Supporting Actress for her performance in Vazandar and Family Katta, winning for latter.

== Ceremony ==
It was held at Bombay Convention & Exhibition Centre, Goregaon, the 3rd Filmfare Marathi Awards honored the films released in 2016. At a press conference helmed by editor of Filmfare magazine, Jio was revealed as the title sponsor. Actors Pushkar Shrotri and Pushkaraj Chirputkar were announced as the co-hosts, while singers Jasraj Jayant Joshi and Priyanka Barve, and actors Sonalee Kulkarni, Bhargavi Chirmule, Manasi Naik, Sanskruti Balgude, Gashmeer Mahajani, Girija Joshi, Abhinay Berde, Mrunmayee Godbole, Vaibhav Tatwawadi, Pooja Sawant, Ankush Chaudhari and Tejaswini Pandit performed during the event. Bollywood actors Jackie Shroff, Deepika Padukone, Aditi Rao Hydari and Madhuri Dixit along with her husband were also present at the event. It took place on 27 October 2017, and was broadcast on Colors Marathi.

== Winners and nominees ==
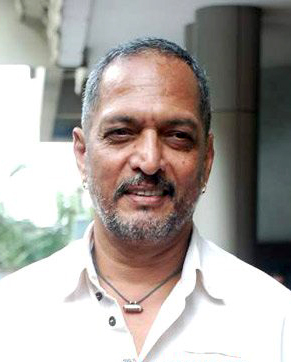
Nana Patekar – Best Actor

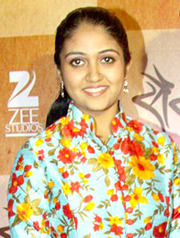
Rinku Rajguru – Best Actress and Best Female Debut

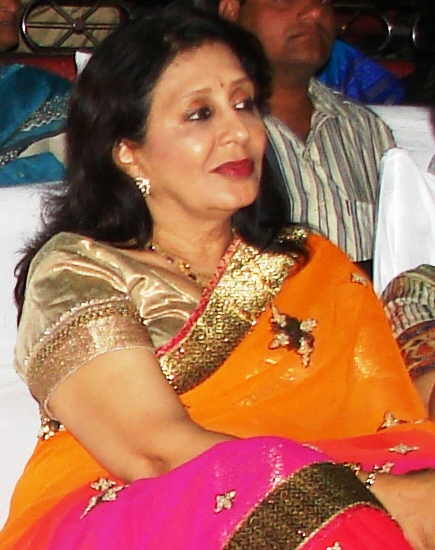
Vandana Gupte – Best Actress Critics

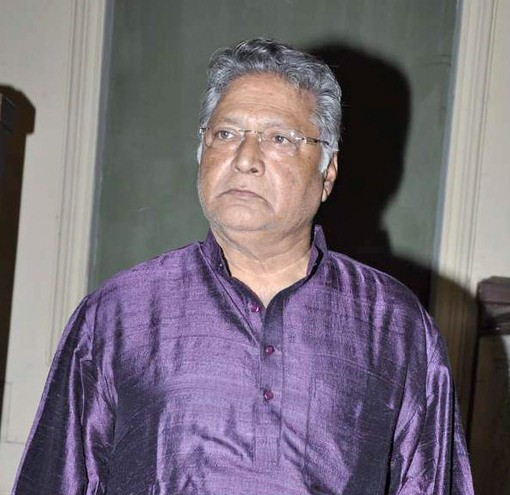
Vikram Gokhale – Best Supporting Actor

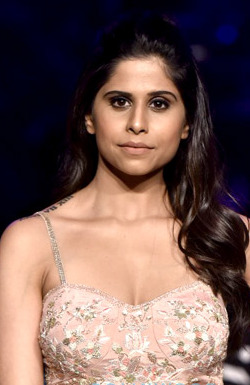
Sai Tamhankar – Best Supporting Actress

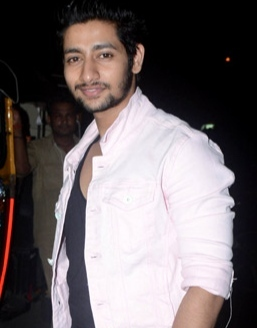
Akash Thosar – Best Male Debut

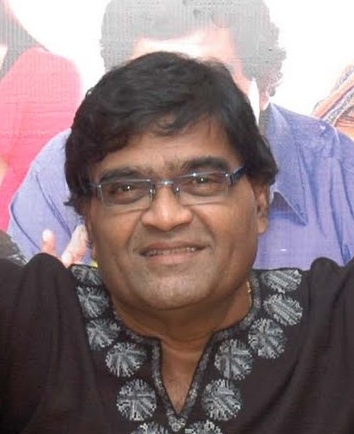
Ashok Saraf – Lifetime Achievement Award

Best Film	Best Director
Sairat; Natsamrat; Ventilator; Family Katta; Vazandar	Nagraj Manjule – Sairat; Mahesh Manjrekar – Natsamrat; Chandrakant Kulkarni – Family Katta; Sachin Kundalkar – Vazandar; Rajesh Mapuskar – Ventilator
Best Actor	Best Actress
Nana Patekar – Natsamrat as Ganpat Ramchandra Belwalkar; Mangesh Desai – Ekk Albela as Bhagwan Dada; Akash Thosar– Sairat as Prashant (Parshya) Kale; Swapnil Joshi – Friends as Neel; Makarand Anaspure – Rangaa Patangaa as Jumman; Jitendra Joshi – Ventilator as Prasanna Kamerkar	Rinku Rajguru – Sairat as Archana (Archi) Patil; Sai Tamhankar – Vazandar as Kaveri; Priya Bapat – Vazandar as Pooja; Medha Manjrekar – Natsamrat as Kaveri Ganpat Belwalkar; Vandana Gupte – Family Katta as Malti Sabnis; Veena Jamkar – Lalbaugchi Rani as Sandhya Parulekar
Best Supporting Actor	Best Supporting Actress
Vikram Gokhale – Natsamrat as Rambhau; Ashutosh Gowariker – Ventilator as Raja Kamerkar; Tanaji Galgunde – Sairat as Pradeep Bansode; Jitendra Joshi – Poshter Girl as Bharatrao Zende; Aniket Vishwasrao – Poshter Girl as Bajrang Dudhbhate; Kishor Kadam – Chaurya	Sai Tamhankar – Family Katta as Manju Sabnis; Mrunmayee Deshpande– Natsamrat as Vidya Ganpat Belwalkar; Chhaya Kadam– Sairat as Suman Akka; Priyanka Bose – Half Ticket as Aai; Sukanya Kulkarni – Ventilator as Sarika; Mrinal Kulkarni – & Jara Hatke as Meera
Best Male Debut	Best Female Debut
Akash Thosar – Sairat as Prashant (Parshya) Kale	Rinku Rajguru – Sairat as Archana (Archi) Patil
Best Music Director	Best Lyricist
Ajay–Atul – Sairat; Amitraj – Poshter Girl; GV Prakash – Half Ticket; Avinash, Vishwajeet – Vazandar; Rohan-Rohan – Ventilator; Hrishikesh-Saurabh-Jasraj – Phuntroo	Ajay–Atul – "Yaad Lagla" – Sairat; Kshitij Patwardhan – "Rubaba Pahije" – Half Ticket; Mandar Cholkar – "Ti Swapnaatalya Pari Saarkhi" – Phuntroo; Manoj Yadav – "Baba" – Ventilator; Omkar Kulkarni – "Golu Polu" – Vazandar; Vaibhav Joshi – "Rakhumai" – Poshter Girl
Best Playback Singer – Male	Best Playback Singer – Female
Ajay Gogavale – "Yaad Lagla" – Sairat; Ajay-Atul – "Zingaat" – Sairat; Anand Shinde, Adarsh Shinde – "Awaaz Vadhav DJ" – Poshter Girl; Jasraj Joshi – "Ti Swapnaatalya Pari Saarkhi" – Phuntroo; Pravin Kuvar – "Pipani" – Photocopy; Swapnil Bandodkar – "Priyankara" – YZ	Chinmayi – "Sairat Zaala Ji" – Sairat; Ketaki Mategaonkar – "Kasa Jeev Guntala" – Phuntroo; Ketaki Mategaonkar – "Priyankara" – YZ; Neha Rajpal – "Tu Jithe" – Photocopy; Shreya Ghoshal – "Aatach Baya" – Sairat; Vibhavari Apte Joshi – "Naatyas Naav Aapulya" – Natsamrat

Critics' awards

Best Film
Mahesh Manjrekar – Natsamrat
Best Actor	Best Actress
Mangesh Desai – Ekk Albela as Bhagwan Dada	Vandana Gupte – Family Katta as Malti Sabnis

Technical Awards

Best Story	Best Screenplay
Rajesh Mapuskar – Ventilator; Chinmay Patankar – Rangaa Patangaa; Hemant Dhome – Poshter Girl; Nagraj Manjule – Sairat; Sachin Kundalkar – Vazandar	Rajesh Mapuskar – Ventilator; Mahesh Manjrekar, Abhijeet Deshpande – Natsamrat; Nagraj Manjule – Sairat; Sachin Kundalkar – Vazandar
Best Dialogue	Best Editing
Nagraj Manjule, Bharat Manjule – Sairat; Dnyanesh Zoting – Half Ticket; Mahesh Manjrekar, Abhijeet Deshpande – Natsamrat; Kshitij Patwardhan – YZ; Rajesh Mapuskar – Ventilator	Rameshwar Bhagat – Ventilator; Faizal-Imran – Half Ticket; Faizal-Imran – YZ; Gorakshnath – Vazandar; Paresh Manjrekar – Natsamrat; Kutub Inamdar – Sairat
Best Choreography	Best Cinematography
Rahul Thombre, Sanjeev Howaladar – "O Kaka" – YZ; Nagraj Manjule – "Zingaat" – Sairat; Siddhesh Dalvi – "Mitra" – Kanha; Subhash Nakashe – "Jagdamba" – Mr. & Mrs. Sadachari; Umesh Jadhav – "Filmy Filmy" – Guru; Umesh Jadhav – "Krishna Janmla" – Kanha	Sanjay Memane – Half Ticket; Ameya Chavan – Kaul: A Calling; Milind Jog – Vazandar; Savita Singh – Ventilator; Sudhakar Yekkanti Reddy – Sairat
Best Production Design	Best Sound Design
Vasu Patil – Half Ticket; Abhishek Redkar – Vazandar; Eknath Kadam – Natsamrat; Siddharth Tatooskar – & Jara Hatke; Siddharth Tatooskar – YZ; Nikhil Kovale – Ventilator	Sanjay Maurya, Allwyn Rego – Ventilator; Avinash Sonawane – Sairat; Avinash Sonawane, Abhishek Nair – Phuntroo; Anmol Bhave – YZ; Anmol Bhave – Half Ticket; Rhitwick Raj Pathak, Siddharth Dubey – Kaul: A Calling
Best Background Score
Ajay–Atul – Sairat; Ajit Parab – Natsamrat; Mannan Munjal – Kaul: A Calling; Rohan-Rohan – Ventilator; Saurabh Bhalerao – YZ; Troy Arif – Half Ticket

Special awards

Lifetime Achievement Award
- Ashok Saraf
Best Debut Director
- Rajesh Mapuskar – Ventilator
Limelight Award
- Mahesh Kothare

== Superlatives ==
Multiple nominations
Nominations	Film
22	Sairat
16	Ventilator
13	Natsamrat
11	Vazandar
9	Half Ticket
8	YZ
6	Poshter Girl
5	Family Katta
5	Phuntroo
3	Kaul: A Calling

Multiple wins
Awards	Film
11	Sairat
5	Ventilator
3	Natsamrat
2	Half Ticket
2	Family Katta
