= 5th Filmfare Awards Marathi =

Indian film awards

5th Filmfare Marathi Awards
- Presented on: 28 February 2021
- Site: St. Andrews, Mumbai
- Hosted by: Siddhartha Jadhav, Amey Wagh
- Organized by: Planet Marathi

Highlights
- Best Film: Anandi Gopal
- Best Critic: Baba
- Most awards: Anandi Gopal (10)
- Most nominations: Anandi Gopal (18)

Television coverage
- Network: Colors Marathi

The 5th Filmfare Marathi Awards is a ceremony, presented by Planet Marathi, honored the best Indian Marathi-language films of 2019.

The ceremony was dominated by Anandi Gopal, which received a leading 18 nominations and 10 wins, including Best Film, Best Director, Best Actor (Critics), Best Actress (Critics) and Best Music Director.

== Ceremony ==
It was held at St. Andrews Auditorium, Bandra, the 5th Filmfare Marathi Awards honored the films released in 2019. At a virtual press conference helmed by editor of Filmfare magazine, Planet Marathi was revealed as the title sponsor. Actors Amey Wagh and Siddhartha Jadhav were announced as the co-hosts, while actors Amruta Khanvilkar, Sonalee Kulkarni, Manasi Naik, Pooja Sawant and Gashmeer Mahajani performed during the event. It took place on 28 February 2021, and was broadcast on 14 March 2021 on Colors Marathi.

== Winners and nominees ==
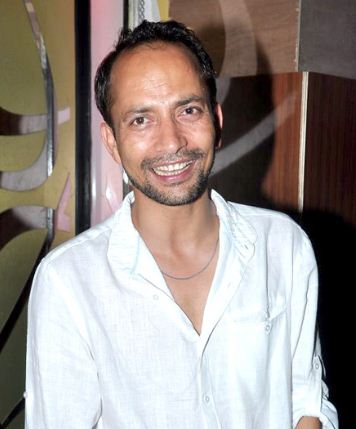
Deepak Dobriyal – Best Actor

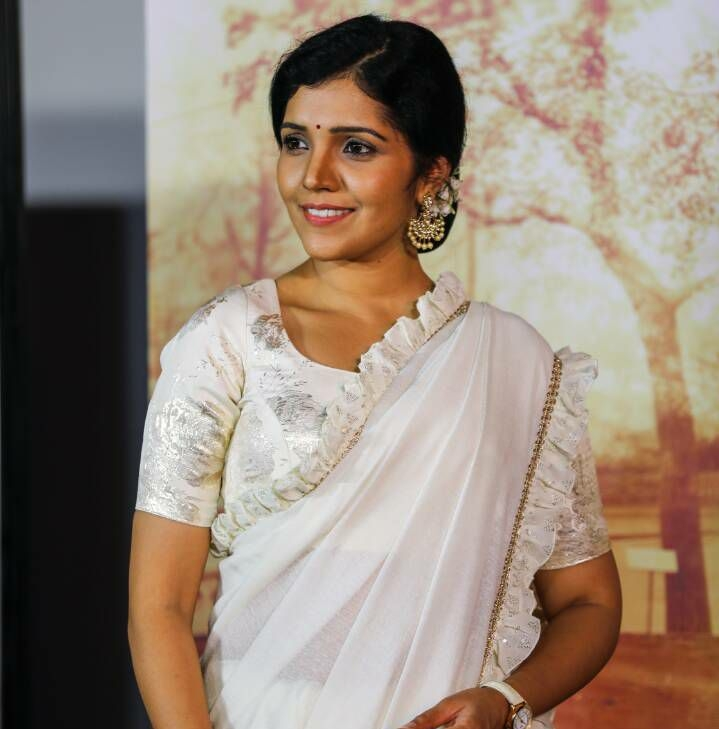
Mukta Barve – Best Actress

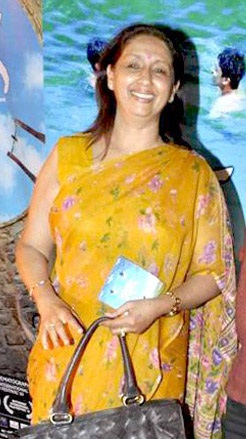
Neena Kulkarni – Best Supporting Actor

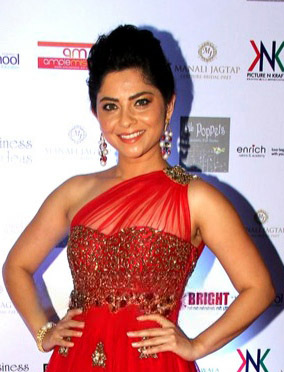
Sonalee Kulkarni – Best Actress Critics

Best Film	Best Director
Anandi Gopal; Fatteshikast; Hirkani; Aatpadi Nights; Girlfriend; Smile Please	Sameer Vidwans – Anandi Gopal; Prasad Oak– Hirkani; Upendra Sidhaye– Girlfriend; Digpal Lanjekar – Fatteshikast; Vikram Phadnis – Smile Please; Nitin Supekar – Aatpadi Nights
Best Actor	Best Actress
Deepak Dobriyal – Baba as Madhav; Amey Wagh– Girlfriend as Nachiket Pradhan; Lalit Prabhakar– Anandi Gopal as Gopalrao Joshi; Ankush Chaudhari – Triple Seat as Krishna; Bhalchandra Kadam – Nashibvaan as Baban; Pranav Raorane – Aatpadi Nights as Vasant Khatmode	Mukta Barve – Smile Please as Nandini; Sonalee Kulkarni – Hirkani as Hirkani; Mrunmayee Deshpande – Miss U Mister as Kaveri; Sayali Sanjeev – Aatpadi Nights as Haripriya; Bhagyashree Milind – Anandi Gopal as Anandi Gopal Joshi; Nandita Patkar – Baba as Anandi
Best Supporting Actor	Best Supporting Actress
Shashank Shende – Kaagar as Guruji / Prabhakar Rao Deshmukh; Sanjay Narvekar – Ye Re Ye Re Paisa 2 as Anna; Chittaranjan Giri – Baba; Upendra Limaye – Sur Sapata as Anna Bhosale; Mangesh Desai – Judgement as Agnivesh Satam	Neena Kulkarni – Mogra Phulaalaa as Aai; Mrinal Kulkarni– Fatteshikast as Rajmata Jijabai; Sonalee Kulkarni – Ti and Ti as Priyanka; Nandita Patkar – Khari Biscuit as Mai; Savita Prabhune – Miss U Mister as Vedha; Chhaya Kadam – Aatpadi Nights
Best Male Debut	Best Female Debut
Shubhankar Tawde – Kaagar as Yuvraj Kadam	Shivani Surve – Triple Seat as Meera
Best Music Director	Best Lyricist
Saurabh-Hrishikesh-Jasraj – Anandi Gopal; Amitraj – Hirkani; Rohan-Rohan – Baba; Avinash and Vishwajeet Joshi – Triple Seat; Rohan-Rohan – Smile Please; Vijay Gavande and Siddharth Dhukate – Aatpadi Nights	Kshitij Patwardhan – "Tula Japnar Ahe" – Khari Biscuit; Kshitij Patwardhan – "Kode Sope Thode" – Girlfriend; Ashwini Shende – "Kay Tu Aahes Mazha" – Triple Seat; Mangesh Kangane – "Haluvar Hak Tu" – Baba; Sanjay Patil – "Jagana He Nyara" – Hirkani; Vaibhav Joshi – "Anand Ghana" – Anandi Gopal
Best Playback Singer – Male	Best Playback Singer – Female
Adarsh Shinde – "Tula Japnar Ahe" – Khari Biscuit; Abhay Jodhpurkar – "Haluvar Haak Tu" – Baba; Avadhoot Gupte – "Thackeray" – Thackeray; Jasraj Joshi – "Querida Querida" – Girlfriend; Rohit Raut – "Manmohini" – Mogra Phulaalaa; Rohit Raut – "Nate He Konte" – Triple Seat	Shalmali Kholgade – "Querida Querida" – Girlfriend; Ketaki Mategaonkar, Sharayu Date – "Ranga Maliyela" – Anandi Gopal; Madhura Kumbhar – "Jagana He Nyara Jhala Ji" – Hirkani; Priyanka Barve – "Waata Waata Waata Waata Ga" – Anandi Gopal; Ronkini Gupta – "Tula Japnar Aahe" – Khari Biscuit; Shreya Ghoshal – "Baghta Tula Me" – Premvari

Critics' awards

Best Film
Raj Gupta – Baba
Best Actor	Best Actress
Lalit Prabhakar – Anandi Gopal as Gopalrao Joshi	Sonalee Kulkarni – Hirkani as Hirkani; Bhagyashree Milind – Anandi Gopal as Anandi Gopal Joshi

Technical Awards

Best Story	Best Screenplay
Manish Singh – Baba; Upendra Sidhaye – Girlfriend; Digpal Lanjekar – Fatteshikast; Vikram Phadnis – Smile Please; Nitin Supekar – Aatpadi Nights	Karan Sharma – Anandi Gopal; Upendra Sidhaye – Girlfriend; Manish Singh – Baba; Vikram Phadnis, Irawati Karnik – Smile Please; Nitin Supekar – Aatpadi Nights
Best Dialogue	Best Editing
Iravati Karnik – Anandi Gopal; Upendra Sidhaye – Girlfriend; Digpal Lanjekar – Fatteshikast; Sumitra Bhave – Welcome Home; Nitin Supekar – Aatpadi Nights	Charushri Roy – Anandi Gopal; Faizal-Imran – Girlfriend; Pramod Kahar – Fatteshikast; Abhijeet Deshpande – Bhai; Apurva Motiwale Sahay, Ashish Mhatre – Khari Biscuit; Apurva Motiwale Sahay, Ashish Mhatre – Hirkani
Best Choreography	Best Cinematography
Rahul Thombre, Sanjeev Howladar – "Majhi Story Cute Wali" – Girlfriend; Rahul Thombre, Sanjeev Howladar – "Premacha Zangadgutta" – Aatpadi Nights; Subhash Nakashe – "Rani Phadakto Lakhoon" – Fatteshikast; Yash, Sapan – "Bol Bol Pakya" – Wedding Cha Shinema	Akash Agarwal – Anandi Gopal; Dhananjay Kulkarni – Welcome Home; Milind Jog – Girlfriend; Arjun Sorte – Baba; Milind Jog – Smile Please; Reshmi Sarkar – Fatteshikast
Best Production Design	Best Sound Design
Sunil Nigvekar & Nilesh Wagh – Anandi Gopal; Ashok Lokare – Girlfriend; Devdas Bhandare – Once More; Sandeep Inamke – Aatpadi Nights; Narendra Haldankar – Bandishala; Satish Chipkar – Khari Biscuit	Nikhil Lanjekar & Himanshu Ambekar – Fatteshikast; Avinash Sonawane – Girlfriend; Bigyna Dahal – Anandi Gopal; Abhishek Nayar, Shijin Melvin Hutton – Baba; Rohit Pradhan – Smile Please
Best Background Score	Best Costume Design
Saurabh Bhalerao – Girlfriend; Abhinay Jagtap – Sur Sapata; Narendra Bhide – Hirkani; Saurabh Bhalerao – Anandi Gopal; Vijay Narayan – Bandishala; Susmit Limaye – Baba	Poornima Oak – Fatteshikast; Poornima Oak – Hirkani; Vikram Phadnis – Smile Please; Namdeo Waghmare – Aatpadi Nights; Sachin Lovalekar – Anandi Gopal

Special awards

Excellence in Marathi Cinema
- Mahesh Kothare
Best Debut Director
- Saleel Kulkarni – Wedding Cha Shinema
Best Child Artist
- Adarsh Kadam – Khari Biscuit as Biscuit
- Vedashree Khadilkar – Khari Biscuit as Khari

== Superlatives ==
Multiple nominations
Nominations	Film
18	Anandi Gopal
15	Girlfriend
12	Aatpadi Nights
12	Baba
10	Fatteshikast
10	Hirkani
9	Smile Please
8	Khari Biscuit
5	Triple Seat

Multiple wins
Awards	Film
10	Anandi Gopal
4	Khari Biscuit
3	Girlfriend
3	Baba
2	Fatteshikast
2	Kaagar
