= Ghaath =

Ghaath may refer to:

- Ghaath (2000 film), an Indian Hindi-language crime drama film
- Ghaath (2023 film), an Indian Marathi-language thriller drama film
