= Filmfare Award for Best Male Debut – Marathi =

Indian award for Marathi language films

Filmfare Marathi Awards for Best Male Debut
- Awarded for: Best Debut Performance by an Actor
- Country: India
- Presented by: Filmfare
- First award: Riteish Deshmukh, Lai Bhaari (2014)
- Currently held by: Kunal Shukla, Teen Paayancha Ghoda & Nishad Bhoir, Gondhal (2025)
- Website: Filmfare winners

The Filmfare Marathi Award for Best Male Debut is given by Filmfare as part of its annual Filmfare Awards for Marathi Cinemas to recognise a male actor in a debut role.

== Winners and nominees ==
=== 2010s ===
- 2014 Riteish Deshmukh – Lai Bhaari as Maauli/Prince
- 2015 Gashmeer Mahajani – Deool Band as Dr. Raghav Shastri
- 2016 Akash Thosar – Sairat as Prashant (Parshya) Kale
- 2017 Abhinay Berde – Ti Saddhya Kay Karte as Anurag
- 2018 No Ceremony
- 2019 No Ceremony

=== 2020s ===
- 2020 Shubhankar Tawde – Kaagar as Yuvraj Kadam
- 2021 Ruturaj Wankhede – Jayanti as Santosh (Santya) & Virat Madke – Kesari as Balram
- 2022 Not Awarded
- 2023 Ashitosh Gaikwad – Unaad as Shubham
- 2024 Dhairya Gholap – Yek Number as Pratap
- 2025 Kunal Shukla – Teen Paayancha Ghoda & Nishad Bhoir – Gondhal
