= Phullwanti =

2024 Marathi film directed by Snehal Tarde

- Theatrical release poster
- Original title: फुलवंती
- Directed by: Snehal Tarde
- Written by: Dialogue: Pravin Tarde
- Based on: Phulwanti by Babasaheb Purandare
- Produced by: Kumar Mangat Pathak; Abhishek Pathak; Mangesh Pawar; Shweta Mali; Prajakta Mali
- Starring: Prajakta Mali; Gashmeer Mahajani
- Cinematography: Mahesh Limaye
- Edited by: Mayur Hardas
- Music by: Avinash–Vishwajeet
- Production companies: Panorama Studios; Mangesh Pawar & Company; Shivoham Creations Pvt. Ltd.
- Distributed by: Panorama Studios
- Release date: 11 October 2024
- Running time: 134 minutes
- Country: India
- Language: Marathi

Phullwanti is a 2024 Indian Marathi-language epic historical drama film directed by actress Snehal Pravin Tarde in her directorial debut, and is produced by Kumar Mangat Pathak, Abhishek Pathak, Mangesh Pawar, Shweta Mali, and Prajakta Mali under the banners of Panorama Studios, Mangesh Pawar & Company, and Shivoham Creations Pvt. Ltd. The film stars Mali in the title role, alongside Gashmeer Mahajani. Based on Babasaheb Purandare's Marathi novel Phulwanti, the film is set in the Peshwa era and narrates the story of the dancer Phullwanti and the renowned Peshwa Pandit scholar Venkat Shastri.

The film was released in theatres on 11 October 2024. The film garnered positive reviews from critics and audiences for its story, music, cinematography, grand presentation, direction, and strong performance by lead actors (especially Mahajani and Mali). The film grossed over ₹7.5 crore (US$780,000) at the box office, becoming a commercial success and the eighth highest-grossing Marathi film of 2024. It won several accolades, including six awards at the Zee Chitra Gaurav Puraskar, among them Best Female Playback Singer. It also won ten awards at the 27th Sanskruti Kala Darpan Awards, including Best Film, Best Actor (Mahajani), Best Actress (Mali), Best Music Director (Avinash–Vishwajeet), and Best Female Playback Singer (Mhade).

== Plot ==
Phulwanti, a renowned Lavani dancer celebrated across India, is invited to perform at a wedding. Initially, she declines; however, upon learning that the wedding is in Pune, she accepts—drawn not by the performance, but by her long-held desire to visit Mastani Mahal. Phulwanti is a great admirer of Mastani, not just as a dancer but as a symbol of courage, grace, and defiance in a world ruled by rigid norms. Her visit to Pune becomes both a personal pilgrimage and an artistic opportunity.

During her time in the city, Phulwanti is also invited to perform on the auspicious occasion of Vasant Panchami at the Peshwa Darbar. She prays to Goddess Saraswati before her performance, blending devotion with dance. Among the many present in the court is Venkat Vishnu Shastri, a respected scholar known for his rigid views and deep-rooted biases. Seeing a Lavani dancer perform in a sacred space irks him, and he prepares to leave—until Phulwanti's graceful tribute to the goddess halts him. Her art moves the audience, but not enough to change Shastri's heart. He murmurs a condescending remark, questioning the purity of Saraswati's presence in the feet of a Lavani dancer. The insult, though veiled, is heard by Phulwanti.

Stung but dignified, Phulwanti challenges Shastri on the spot: he must play the pakhwaj, an instrument he has no skill in, while she dances. The first to make three mistakes will lose—and become a slave to the other. Shock ripples through the court, but Shastri, calmly accepts. Thus begins an unusual competition: intellect versus art, pride versus surrender.

Phulwanti trains rigorously under some of the finest gurus from across India, refining her already masterful technique. Shastri, on the other hand, is reprimanded by his own guru, who warns him that he has not only insulted a true artist, but also the very essence of art. Still, Shastri, bound by his promise, learns the pakhwaj with discipline and humility. As the date nears, the city buzzes with anticipation.

At home, Shastri's wife, Laxmi, quietly suffers. She fears that if her husband loses, their dignity will be crushed, and if he wins, a beautiful, talented woman may enter their home as a slave. Torn between loyalty and insecurity, she continues to support her husband with silent prayers and unwavering strength.

The day of the competition arrives. The court is full, the tension palpable. What unfolds is a breathtaking duel—Phulwanti's dance in perfect rhythm with Shastri's surprising command of the pakhwaj. Both push themselves to the limit. Eventually, Phulwanti makes her third mistake. Shastri wins.

To everyone's shock, Phulwanti smiles. She bows in respect, not in defeat. That night, Phulwanti reveals that she lost purposefully and knowingly. She is least disheartened by her loss. Shastri arrives to claim his reward. But instead of taking her to his home, he brings her to the Peshwa Wada and frees her, declaring that he only wanted to free her from the ego she had unknowingly developed. Phulwanti is moved to tears. She confesses she had fallen in love with him since the day she saw him—not just as a scholar, but as a man of fierce integrity.

Still, she refuses freedom, not out of pride, but love. The next morning, she arrives at Shastri's house, only to find it empty. A lone servant hands her a letter and her ghungroos. The letter reads she is free to keep her house, her art, and her pride. Shastri acknowledges her feelings but affirms his loyalty to his wife.

Elsewhere, on the road leaving Pune, Laxmi quietly asks her husband if her place in his heart was ever shaken. Shastri, caught off guard, begins to speak, but she gently stops him. “Don’t answer,” she says, “because I know you won’t lie… and I’m not ready to hear the truth.” The silence that follows is heavy—not with guilt or betrayal, but with the quiet weight of choices made for love, duty, and honour.

The movie ends with Phulwanti putting on her ghungroos and dancing her heart out in the house of Vishnu Shastri.

== Cast ==
- Prajakta Mali as Phullwanti
- Gashmeer Mahajani as Venkatadhwari Narasimha Shastri
- Snehal Tarde as Lakshmi Venkat Shastri
- Prasad Oak as Bakhre Savkar Naik
- Vaibhav Mangle as Martand Bhairavacharya
- Mangesh Desai as Subhedar Mankar
- Kshitish Date as Shrimant Sawai Madhavrao Peshwa
- Hrishikesh Joshi as Pant Chitnis
- Sukhada Khandkekar as Ragini Devi
- Jaywant Wadkar as Vitthoba
- Savita Malpekar as Radhakka
- Deepti Lele as Peshawinbai
- Sunil Abhyankar as Nana Fadnavis
- Nikhil Raut as Bayja
- Samir Choughule as Wamanrao
- Vibhavari Deshpande as Avanti Devi
- Chinmayee Sumeet as Minakshi Devi
- Vijay Patwardhan as Narayan
- Vanita Kharat
- Gaurav More
- Mir Sarvar as Badshah
- Chetana Bhat
- Siddheshwar Zadbukke as Anand Shastri
- Prithvik Pratap as Chimanrao
- Rohit Mane

== Production ==
The film marks the directorial debut of actress Snehal Tarde and the producing debut of actress Prajakta Mali under her banner, Shivoham Creations Pvt. Ltd. Filming was completed in mid-July 2024. In September 2024, a poster revealed additional cast members, including Prasad Oak, Vaibhav Mangle, Hrishikesh Joshi, Kshitish Date, and Tarde herself.

== Music ==
The first song, the title track, was released on 12 September 2024. The music was compared by Avinash–Vishwajeet

Track listing
No.	Title	Lyrics	Singer(s)	Length
1.	"Phullwanti - Title Track"	Snehal Tarde, Vaibhav Joshi, Vishwajeet Joshi	Aarya Ambekar	2:56
2.	"Madanmanjiri"	Dr. Prasad Biware	Vaishali Mhade	3:38
3.	"Hey Sharade"	Mandar Cholkar	Rahul Deshpande	3:37
4.	"Bho Shambhoo"	Traditional, Vishwajeet Joshi	Rahul Deshpande; Bela Shende	4:44
Total length:				14:55

== Marketing ==
On the occasion of Akshaya Tritiya 2024, the makers officially announced the film with a motion poster. Mali's look was released on her birthday, along with the film's release date. Gashmeer Mahajani's character's motion poster was revealed on 5 September 2024, coinciding with Teachers' Day. The teaser for the film, released on 21 September, captivated audiences with its stunning sets, powerful historical characters, high production values, and sharp dialogues, all of which were highly praised.

== Release ==
The film was theatrically released on 11 October 2024. OTT release on Amazon Prime on November 22, 2024.

== Reception ==
=== Critical reception ===
Anub George from The Times of India rated 3.5 out of 5 stars, commending its stunning sets, effective direction by Snehal Tarde, and excellent cinematography by Mahesh Limaye, all of which enhance the captivating narrative. However, he identified a notable flaw in the dance sequences, mentioning that, despite Mali's dancing talent, the editing and shot choices diminish her character's reputation. While the choreography looks impressive in wide shots, the emotional impact is lost due to the editing. Nevertheless, the reviewer recognises that Mali's strong acting makes up for this shortcoming. Santosh Bhingarde of Sakal rated 3.5 stars out of 5 stars and praised the film's strong, impressive music, performances, beautiful visuals, and applauded the effort to create a grand and elegant portrayal of the Peshwa era. Acknowledged some flaws but suggests that these can be overlooked due to the film's ambition and its rich display of beauty and dance. Kalpeshraj Kunal of Maharashtra Times rated the film 3 stars out of 5 stars, and praised screenplay, dialogues, direction, and cinematography for vividly bringing the Peshwa era to life. He commends Prajakta's dance, Umesh Jadhav's choreography, and Avinash-Vishwajit's music for enhancing the historical atmosphere. The dialogue is noted for its poetic rhythm and sharpness, effectively reflecting the characters' personalities.

=== Box office ===
The film collected ₹8 lakh (US$8,300) on its opening day and ₹1.19 crore (US$120,000) in its opening weekend.

=== Accolades ===
Awards	Year	Category	Recipient	Result	Ref
City Cine Awards	2024	Best Film	Phullwanti	Nominated	
City Cine Awards	2024	Best Director	Snehal Tarde	Won	
City Cine Awards	2024	Best Screenplay	Snehal Tarde	Nominated	
City Cine Awards	2024	Best Actor	Gashmeer Mahajani	Nominated	
City Cine Awards	2024	Best Actress	Prajakta Mali	Nominated	
City Cine Awards	2024	Best Music Director	Avinash–Vishwajeet	Nominated	
City Cine Awards	2024	Best Lyricist	Dr. Prasad Bivare (song "Madanmanjiri")	Nominated	
City Cine Awards	2024	Best Singer Male	Rahul Deshpande (song "Hey Sharada")	Nominated	
City Cine Awards	2024	Best Singer Female	Aarya Ambekar (song "Phulvanti - Title Song")	Nominated	
Zee Chitra Gaurav Puraskar	2025	Best Film	Phullwanti	Nominated	
Zee Chitra Gaurav Puraskar	2025	Best Actor	Gashmeer Mahajani	Nominated	
Zee Chitra Gaurav Puraskar	2025	Best Actress	Prajakta Mali	Nominated	
Zee Chitra Gaurav Puraskar	2025	The Most Natural Performance Of The Year	Prajakta Mali	Won	
Zee Chitra Gaurav Puraskar	2025	Best Supporting Actor	Kshitish Date	Nominated	
Zee Chitra Gaurav Puraskar	2025	Best Supporting Actor	Sunil Abhyankar	Nominated	
Zee Chitra Gaurav Puraskar	2025	Best Supporting Actress	Chinmayee Sumeet	Nominated	
Zee Chitra Gaurav Puraskar	2025	Best Music Director	Avinash–Vishwajeet	Nominated	
Zee Chitra Gaurav Puraskar	2025	Best Background Music	Avinash–Vishwajeet	Nominated	
Zee Chitra Gaurav Puraskar	2025	Best Sound Designer	Pranam Pansare	Nominated	
Zee Chitra Gaurav Puraskar	2025	Best Playback Singer – Female	Aarya Ambekar (song "Phulvanti - Title Song")	Nominated	
Zee Chitra Gaurav Puraskar	2025	Best Playback Singer – Female	Vaishali Mhade (song "Madanmanjiri")	Won	
Zee Chitra Gaurav Puraskar	2025	Best Cinematographer	Mahesh Limaye	Won	
Zee Chitra Gaurav Puraskar	2025	Best Makeup Artist	Mahesh Barate	Won	
Zee Chitra Gaurav Puraskar	2025	Best Custom	Manasi Attarde	Won	
Zee Chitra Gaurav Puraskar	2025	Best Art Director	Eknath Kadam	Nominated	
Zee Chitra Gaurav Puraskar	2025	Best Choreographer	Umesh Jadhav	Won	
NDTV Marathi Entertainment Awards	2025	Best Film	Phullwanti	Nominated	
NDTV Marathi Entertainment Awards	2025	Best Director	Snehal Tarde	Nominated	
NDTV Marathi Entertainment Awards	2025	Best Screenplay	Snehal Tarde	Nominated	
NDTV Marathi Entertainment Awards	2025	Best Actor in a Leading Role	Gashmeer Mahajani	Won	
NDTV Marathi Entertainment Awards	2025	Best Actress in a Leading Role	Prajakta Mali	Won	
NDTV Marathi Entertainment Awards	2025	Best Actor in a Supporting Role	Hrishikesh Joshi	Nominated	
NDTV Marathi Entertainment Awards	2025	Best Actress in a Supporting Role	Chinmayee Sumeet	Nominated	
NDTV Marathi Entertainment Awards	2025	Best Music Album	Avinash–Vishwajeet	Nominated	
NDTV Marathi Entertainment Awards	2025	Best Background Score	Avinash–Vishwajeet	Nominated	
NDTV Marathi Entertainment Awards	2025	Best Playback Singer (Female)	Vaishali Mhade (song "Madanmanjiri")	Won	
NDTV Marathi Entertainment Awards	2025	Best Lyricist	Dr. Prasad Bivare (song "Madanmanjiri")	Nominated	
NDTV Marathi Entertainment Awards	2025	Best Art Director	Eknath Kadam	Won	
NDTV Marathi Entertainment Awards	2025	Best Cinematography	Mahesh Limaye	Won	
NDTV Marathi Entertainment Awards	2025	Best Custom Design	Manasi Attarde	Nominated	
MaTa Sanman	2025	Best Film	Phullwanti	Nominated	
MaTa Sanman	2025	Best Actress	Prajakta Mali	Nominated	
MaTa Sanman	2025	Best Cinematography	Mahesh Limaye	Won	
MaTa Sanman	2025	Best Playback Singer (Female)	Vaishali Mhade (song "Madanmanjiri")	Won	
MaTa Sanman	2025	Best Music Director	Avinash–Vishwajeet	Nominated	
MaTa Sanman	2025	Best Art Director	Eknath Kadam	Nominated	
Sanskruti Kala Darpan Awards	2025	Best Film	Phullwanti	Won	
Sanskruti Kala Darpan Awards	2025	Best Actor	Gashmeer Mahajani	Won	
Sanskruti Kala Darpan Awards	2025	Best Actress	Prajakta Mali	Won	
Sanskruti Kala Darpan Awards	2025	Best Music Director	Avinash–Vishwajeet	Won	
Sanskruti Kala Darpan Awards	2025	Best Female Playback Singer	Vaishali Mhade (song "Madanmanjiri")	Won	
Sanskruti Kala Darpan Awards	2025	Best Cinematography	Mahesh Limaye	Won	
Sanskruti Kala Darpan Awards	2025	Best Dialogue	Pravin Tarde	Won	
Sanskruti Kala Darpan Awards	2025	Best Choreography	Umesh Jadhav	Won	
Sanskruti Kala Darpan Awards	2025	Best Custom Design	Manasi Attarde	Won	
Sanskruti Kala Darpan Awards	2025	Best Art Direction	Eknath Kadam	Won	
Filmfare Awards Marathi	2025	Best Film	Phullwanti	Nominated	
Filmfare Awards Marathi	2025	Best Director Debut	Snehal Tarde	Nominated	
Filmfare Awards Marathi	2025	Best Screenplay	Snehal Tarde	Nominated	
Filmfare Awards Marathi	2025	Best Actor	Gashmeer Mahajani	Nominated	
Filmfare Awards Marathi	2025	Best Actress	Prajakta Mali	Won	
Filmfare Awards Marathi	2025	Best Music Director	Avinash–Vishwajeet	Won	
Filmfare Awards Marathi	2025	Best Background Score	Avinash–Vishwajeet	Nominated	
Filmfare Awards Marathi	2025	Best Lyricist	Dr. Prasad Biware (song "Madanmanjiri")	Nominated	
Filmfare Awards Marathi	2025	Best Playback Singer – Male	Rahul Deshpande (song "Hey Sharade")	Nominated	
Filmfare Awards Marathi	2025	Best Playback Singer – Female	Aarya Ambekar (song "Phullwanti - Title Track")	Nominated	
Filmfare Awards Marathi	2025	Best Playback Singer – Female	Vaishali Mhade (song "Madanmanjiri")	Won	
Filmfare Awards Marathi	2025	Best Dialogue	Pravin Vitthal Tarde	Nominated	
Filmfare Awards Marathi	2025	Best Sound Design	Pranam Pansare	Nominated	
Filmfare Awards Marathi	2025	Best Choreography	Umesh Jadhav (song "Phullwanti - Title Track")	Won	
Filmfare Awards Marathi	2025	Best Cinematography	Mahesh Limaye	Won	
Filmfare Awards Marathi	2025	Best Production Design	Eknath Kadam	Won	
Filmfare Awards Marathi	2025	Best Costume Design	Manasi Attarde	Won	
Zee24Taas Marathi Sanman	2025	Best Director	Snehal Tarde	Won	
Zee24Taas Marathi Sanman	2025	Best Actress	Prajakta Mali	Won	
Zee24Taas Marathi Sanman	2025	Best Playback Singer – Female	Vaishali Mhade (song "Madanmanjiri")	Won	
Lokshahi Marathi Chitra Sanman	2025	Popular Film	Phullwanti	Pending	
Lokshahi Marathi Chitra Sanman	2025	Best Actress	Prajakta Mali	Pending	
Lokshahi Marathi Chitra Sanman	2025	Best Song	Phullwanti (Title Track)	Pending	
Maharashtra State Film Awards	2026	Best Actor	Gashmeer Mahajani	Won	
Maharashtra State Film Awards	2026	Best Choreography	Umesh Jadhav	Won	
Maharashtra State Film Awards	2026	Best Cinematography	Mahesh Limaye	Won	
