= Filmfare Award for Best Music Director – Marathi =

Indian award for Marathi language films

Filmfare Marathi Awards for Best Music Director
- Awarded for: Best Performance by a Music Director
- Country: India
- Presented by: Filmfare
- First award: Shridhar Phadke, Lekroo (1999)
- Currently held by: Gulraj Singh, Saurabh Bhalerao, Ata Thambaycha Naay! (2025)
- Website: Filmfare Awards

The Filmfare Best Music Album Award is given by the Filmfare magazine as part of its annual Filmfare Marathi Awards for Marathi Cinema, to the best composer/arranger of a soundtrack. The award in this category was first presented in 1999. Shridhar Phadke was the first recipient of this award for the film Lekroo.

== Winner and nominees ==
=== 1990s ===
Year	Photos of winners	Music Director	Film
1994		Shridhar Phadke	Varsa Laxmicha
1995		Anand Modak	Mukta
1996		Anand Modak	Raosaheb
1997		Shridhar Phadke	Putravati
1998		Anand Modak	Tu Tithe Mee
1999		Shridhar Phadke	Lekroo

=== 2010 ===
Year	Photos of winners	Music Director	Film
2014		Ajay-Atul	Lai Bhaari
2014		Chinar–Mahesh	Timepass
2014		Anand Modak	Rama Madhav
2014		Ajay Naik	Baavare Prem He
2014		Mahesh Kulkarni	Happy Journey
2015		Shankar-Ehsaan-Loy and Jitendra Abhisheki	Katyar Kaljat Ghusali
2015		Chinar–Mahesh	Timepass 2
2015		Avinash-Vishwajeet	Mumbai-Pune-Mumbai 2
2015		Shankar-Ehsaan-Loy, Nilesh Moharir & Pankaj Padgham	Mitwaa
2015		Hrishikesh-Saurabh-Jasraj	Double Seat
2016		Ajay-Atul	Sairat
2016		Amitraj	Poshter Girl
2016		Avinash-Vishwajeet	Vazandar
2016		Rohan-Rohan	Ventilator
2016		Hrishikesh-Saurabh-Jasraj	Phuntroo
2016		G. V. Prakash Kumar	Half Ticket
2017		Nilesh Moharir, Mandar Apte and Avinash-Vishwajeet	Ti Saddhya Kay Karte
2017		Avadhoot Gupte	Boyz
2017		Avinash-Vishwajeet	Mumbai-Pune-Mumbai 2
2017		Amitraj & Nilesh Moharir	Tula Kalnnaar Nahi
2017		AV Prafullachandra	Zala Bobhata
2017		Praful Karlekar	Hrudayantar

=== 2020s ===
Year	Photos of winners	Music Director	Film
2020		Saurabh-Hrishikesh-Jasraj	Anandi Gopal
2020		Amitraj	Hirkani
2020		Avinash-Vishwajeet	Triple Seat
2020		Rohan-Rohan	Smile Please
2020		Rohan-Rohan	Baba
2020		Vijay Gawande & Siddharth Dhukate	Aatpadi Nights
2021		Amitraj	Jhimma
2021		Chinar–Mahesh	Darling
2021		Chinar–Mahesh & Swapnil-Prafull	Choricha Mamla
2021		Avadhoot Gupte	Pandu
2021		AV Prafullachandra	Dhurala
2021		AV Prafullachandra	Karkhanisanchi Waari
2022		Ajay-Atul	Chandramukhi
2022		Amitraj & Pankaj Padgham	Tamasha Live
2022		Hitesh Modak, Saleel Kulkarni, Ajit Parab & Pawandeep Rajan	Panghrun
2022		Ajay-Atul	Ved
2022		Rahul Deshpande	Me Vasantrao
2022		Souumil Siddharth	Sunny
2023		Ajay-Atul	Maharashtra Shahir
2023		Amitraj	Jhimma 2
2023		AV Prafullachandra	Ghar Banduk Biryani
2023		AV Prafullachandra	Naal 2
2023		Sai-Piyush	Baipan Bhaari Deva
2023		Gulraj Singh	Unaad
2024		Avinash–Vishwajeet	Phullwanti
2024		Amitraj	Sridevi Prasanna
2024		Bhushan Mate	Amaltash
2024		Gulraj Singh	Paani
2024		Sanket Sane	Gharat Ganpati
2024		Tanmay Bhide	Naach Ga Ghuma
2025		Gulraj Singh, Saurabh Bhalerao	Ata Thambaycha Naay!
2025		AV Prafullachandra	Dashavatar
2025		Amitraj	Fussclass Dabhade
2025		Gulraj Singh	Aarpar
2025		Ilaiyaraaja	Gondhal
2025		Rohan-Rohan	April May 99
