= Filmfare Award for Best Editing – Marathi =

Indian award for Marathi language films

Filmfare Marathi Awards for Best Editing
- Awarded for: Best Performance by an Editor
- Country: India
- Presented by: Filmfare
- First award: Dinesh Poojari, Rege (2014)
- Currently held by: Abhijeet Deshpande, Sthal (2025)
- Website: Filmfare Awards

The Filmfare Marathi Award for Best Editing is given by Filmfare, a film magazine in India, as part of its annual Filmfare Awards for Marathi films.

== Winner and nominees ==
=== 2010s ===
Year	Recipient(s)	Film
2014	Dinesh Poojari	Rege
2014	Jayant Jathar	Yellow
2014	Aarif Sheikh	Lai Bhaari
2014	Chandan Arora	Fandry
2014	Rajesh Rao	Sau Shashi Deodhar
2015	Rikhav Desai	Court
2016	Rameshwar Bhagat	Ventilator
2016	Kutub Inamdar	Sairat
2016	Faisal-Imran	YZ
2016	Faisal-Imran	Half Ticket
2016	Gorakshnath	Vazandar
2016	Paresh Manjrekar	Natsamrat
2017	Faisal-Imran	Faster Fene
2017	Faisal-Imran	Baghtos Kay Mujra Kar
2017	Charu Shree Roy	Manjha
2017	Dinesh Poojari	Lapachhapi
2017	Jayant Jathar	Shentimental

=== 2020s ===
Year	Recipient(s)	Film
2020	Charu Shree Roy	Anandi Gopal
2020	Abhijeet Deshpande	Bhai
2020	Faisal-Imran	Girlfriend
2020	Pramod Kahar	Fatteshikast
2020	Apurva Motiwale Sahay, Ashish Mhatre	Hirkani
2020	Apurva Motiwale Sahay, Ashish Mhatre	Khari Biscuit
2021	Abhijeet Deshpande, Sourabh Prabhudesai	Bali
2021	Devendra Murdeshwar	Bonus
2021	Chaitanya Tamhane	The Disciple
2021	Nilesh Meena Rasal, Saumitra Dharasurkar	Mhorkya
2021	Suchitra Sathe	Karkhanisanchi Waari
2021	Faisal-Imran	Dhurala
2022 (7th)	Jayant Jathar	Y
2022 (7th)	Pramod Kahar	Pawankhind
2022 (7th)	Faisal-Imran	Daagadi Chawl 2
2022 (7th)	Vaibhav Dabhade	Zollywood
2022 (7th)	Chandan Arora	Ved
2022 (7th)	Sagar Shinde, Vinay Shinde, Ninad Kaskhedikar	Sher Shivraj
2023 (8th)	Faisal Mahadik, Imran Mahadik	Aatmapamphlet
2023 (8th)	Abhijeet Deshpande, Saurabh Prabhudesai	Vaalvi
2023 (8th)	B. Mahanteshwar	Shyamchi Aai
2023 (8th)	Faisal Mahadik, Imran Mahadik	Unaad
2023 (8th)	Kutub Inamdar	Ghar Banduk Biryani
2023 (8th)	Mayur Hardas	Chowk
2024 (9th)	Mayur Hardas, Adinath Kothare	Paani
2024 (9th)	Navnit Sen	Ghaath
2024 (9th)	Rahul Bhatankar	Juna Furniture
2024 (9th)	Jitendra K. Shah	Ole Aale
2024 (9th)	Ashish Mhatre	Gharat Ganpati
2024 (9th)	Suhas Desale	Amaltash
2025 (10th)	Abhijeet Deshpande	Sthal
2025 (10th)	Abhijeet Deshpande	Jarann
2025 (10th)	Ashish Mhatre	Gondhal
2025 (10th)	Faisal Mahadik	Dashavatar
2025 (10th)	Ninad Khanolkar	April May 99
2025 (10th)	Sanjay Sankla	Ata Thambaycha Naay!

== See also ==
- Filmfare Awards Marathi
- Filmfare Awards
- Filmfare Award for Best Director – Marathi
- Filmfare Award for Best Cinematographer – Marathi
- Filmfare Award for Best Background Score – Marathi
