= Shanta Shelke =

Indian poet & writer

- Born: Shanta Shelke; 12 October 1922; Indapur, Bombay Presidency, British India
- Died: 6 June 2002 (aged 79); Pune, Maharashtra, India
- Occupations: Poet, Writer

Shanta Janardan Shelke (12 October 1922 – 6 June 2002) was an Indian poet and writer in the Marathi language. She was also a noted journalist and academic. Her work included song compositions, stories, translations, and children's literature. She presided over many literary gatherings. Some of her compositions were noted either as stand-alone poetic works or as songs sung

== Background ==
Shanta Shelke was born in Indapur, Pune. She completed her primary education in Mahatma Gandhi Vidyalaya, Rajgurunagar and high school education from Huzurpaga (HHCP High School), Pune. She did her graduation from Pune's S. P. College. She completed her M.A. in Marathi and Sanskrit and stood first in Mumbai University. During this time, she also won the Na. Chi. Kelkar and Chiplunkar awards.

She spent 5 years working as assistant editor of the weekly Navyug run by Acharya Atre. She then moved to Nagpur to work as a professor of Marathi at Hislop College, Nagpur. She eventually retired from Maharshi Dayanand College, (Parel, Mumbai) and settled in Pune.

During her working career in Mumbai, she also served in

- The Central Board of Film Certification
- The Theatre examination board
- The Govt. book award

== Shanta Shelke's work ==
Shanta Shelke contributed to Marathi literature in the form of poems, stories, novels, character sketches, interviews, critiques, and introductions. She also helped translate English cinema and wrote newspaper columns.

=== Newspaper columns ===
Some of her newspaper columns were later converted into books.

- Ek pani (एक पानी)
  - Translation: Single pager
- Madarangi (मदरंगी)
- Janata Ajanata (जाणता अजाणता)
  - Translation: Knowing Unknowingly

=== Lalit Literature ===
- Anandache Jhad (आनंदाचे झाड)
  - Translation: The tree of happiness
- Pavsaadhicha Paus (पावसा आधीचा पाऊस)
  - Translation:The rain before the rains
- Sansmarane (संस्मरणे)
  - Translation:Memories
- DhoolPati (धूळपाटी) – an introspective autobiography.
- Avad Nivad (आवड निवड)
  - Translation: Likes dislikes
- Vadildhari Manase (वडीलधारी माणसे) – a collection of character sketches.
  - Translation: Father figures

=== Novels ===
- Odh (ओढ)
- Dharma (धर्म)
- Punarjanma (पुनर्जन्म)
- Chikkhaldrayancha Mantrik (चिखलदऱ्यांचा मांत्रिक)
- Nararakshas (नरराक्षस)
- Bhishanchaya (भीषण छाया)
- Majha Khel Mandu De (माझा खेळ मांडू दे)
- Vijhti Jyot (विझती ज्योत)

=== Poetical and song collections ===
Though children's literature was her favourite subject, she gained popularity as a poet and music composer.

- Varsha (वर्षा)
- Gondan (गोंदण)
- Rupasi (रूपसी)
- Janmajanhavi (जन्मजाह्नवी)
- Kalyanche divas fulanchya rati (कळ्यांचे दिवस फ़ुलांच्या राती)
- Toch Chandrama (तोच चन्द्रमा)
- Purvasandhya (पूर्वसंध्या)
- Ityartha (इत्यर्थ)

=== Songs ===
Apart from her contributions to Marathi literature, Shanta Shelke was equally famous for writing lyrics for Marathi songs. She penned songs for more than 300 films.

She wrote her first song for the film Ram Ram Pavna (राम राम पाव्हणं) in 1950. Her initial songs captured the imagination of her audience and made her a household name:

- Reshmachya Reghanni (रेशमाच्या रेघांनी) – a Marathi Laavani.(sung by Asha Bhosale)
- Je ved majala lagale (ज़े वेड मज़ला लागले)
- Pavner Ga Mayela Karoo (पावनेर ग मायेला करू)

Some of her memorable creations are:

- Sung by Pandit Jitendra Abhisheki
  - Kaanta Rute Kunala ( a Marathi "Ghazal")

Music composer Kaushal Inamdar composed an entire album of her songs called 'Shubhra Kalya Moothbhar' when Shanta Shelke was elected President of the Akhil Bharatiya Marathi Sahitya Sammelan in 1996. The songs in the CD were:

1) Kalyanche Divas Phulanchya Raati – Sung by Bhagyashree Mule

2) Aaj Avelich Kashi Saanj Zhaali – Sung by Pt. Satyasheel Deshpande

3) Mala Vatate Ga Nava Janma Gheu – Sung by Shobha Joshi

4) Sampale Swapna Te Shodhisi Ka Punha – Sung by Ajit Parab

5) Gharaparatichya Vaatevarati – Sung by Sadhana Sargam

6) Shubhra Kalya Moothbhar – Sung by Shobha Joshi

7) Ranparya – Sung by Pratibha Damle, Shilpa Pai & Suchitra Inamdar

8) Kahi Bolalis Ka – Sung by Rishikesh Kamerkar & Ranjana Jogalekar

9) Disato Tula Ka Sajani – Sung by Pt. Satyasheel Deshpande

10) Vilaya Jag He Jaail Saare – Sung by Ajit Parab & Pratibha Damle

11) Deenanatha Dayasagara – Sung by Omkar Dadarkar

=== Translations ===
She translated the following works:

- Japanese haiku to produce Panyavarchya Paklya (पाण्यावरच्या पाकळ्या).
- The Sanskrit work by poet Kalidasa Meghdoot into Marathi.
- A Novel by Virendra Bhattachrya's Novel into Lokanche Rajya (लोकांचे राज्य)
- A Novel Little Women by Louisa May Alcott into Chaughijani (चौघीजणी)

== Awards and recognitions ==
- Soor Singaar award for her song Mage Ubha Mangesh (मागे उभा मंगेश, पुढे उभा मंगेश)
- Govt. of India award of excellent for song-writing for her cinema Bhujang (भुजंग)
- Ga Di Madgulkar award in 1996.
- Yashvantrao Chawan Pratishan Award in 2001, for her contribution to Marathi literature.

== Death ==
Shanta Shelke died of cancer on 6 June 2002.
