= Ringan =

Rangan رنگان
- Village
- Location within Iran
- Coordinates: 36°12′49″N 58°40′42″E
- Country: Iran
- Province: Razavi Khorasan
- County: Nishapur
- Bakhsh: Central
- Rural District: Mazul

Population (2006)
  - Total: 146
- Time zone: UTC+3:30 (IRST)
  - Summer (DST): UTC+4:30 (IRDT)

Rangan (Persian: رنگان, also Romanized as Rangan; also known as Rangan) is a village in Mazul Rural District, in the Central District of Nishapur County, Razavi Khorasan province, Iran. At the 2006 census, its population was 146, in 38 families.
