= Aata Vel Zaali =

2024 film directed by Ananth Mahadevan

- Theatrical release poster
- English: It's Time to Go!
- Directed by: Ananth Mahadevan
- Written by: Anant Mahadevan; Mahendra Patil
- Produced by: Dinesh Bansal; G K Agrawal; Ananth Mahadevan
- Starring: Dilip Prabhavalkar; Rohini Hattangadi
- Cinematography: Pradeep Khanvilkar
- Edited by: Kush Tripathy; Ananth Mahadevan
- Music by: Sanjoy Chowdhury
- Production companies: Imagine Entertainment and Media; Ananth Mahadevan Films
- Release dates: February 2023 (Pune); 23 February 2024
- Running time: 92 minutes
- Country: India
- Language: Marathi
- Budget: ₹1.40 crore

Aata Vel Zaali (transl. Now it's time) is a 2023 Indian Marathi-language psychological drama film written and directed by Ananth Mahadevan and produced by Dinesh Bansal, G. K. Agrawal, and Ananth Mahadevan under Imagine Entertainment and Media, and Ananth Mahadevan Films. The film stars Dilip Prabhavalkar and Rohini Hattangadi in a story inspired by a true incident, which explores the controversial topic of euthanasia.

Aata Vel Zaali was screened at the Dallas International Film Festival, the Pune International Film Festival, the Rajasthan International Film Festival, the Jagran Film Festival, the 15th Indian Film Festival of Ireland and the LIFE AFTER OIL International Film Festival. The film was theatrically released on 23 February 2024 with English subtitles.

== Plot ==
The true story of an existential crisis in the lives of an elderly couple who feel that they are leading unproductive and obsolete lives and hence seek active euthanasia as an unusual remedy. Shashidhar, a gentleman who has lived happily with his wife Ranjana Lele, wishes to make a dignified, painless exit before two likely calamities can befall them...either being reduced to a vegetative state or living a life deprived of the company of the spouse who passes first. Shashidhar and Ranjana attempt to convince a disbelieving world of their unorthodox outlook towards life and its reality until the universe itself conspires for an unexpected closure.

== Cast ==
- Dilip Prabhavalkar as Shashidhar Lele
- Rohini Hattangadi as Ranjana Lele
- Bhagyashree Limaye as Young Ranjana Lele
- Shivraj Waichal as Young Shashidhar Lele
- Jaywant Wadkar as neighbour
- Bharat Dabholkar as newspaper editor
- Abhinav Patekar
- Guru Thakur as advocate
- Smita Tambe

== Production ==
National Film Awards winner Ananth Mahadevan wrote, directed, co-produced and co-edited the film with Mahendra Patil writing the dialogue.

Principal photography started in 2021. In January 2022 Mahadevan confirmed that Shivraj Waichal and Bhagyashree Limaye will be playing young characters of Prabhavalkar and Hattangadi respectively.

== Release ==
=== Theatrical ===
The film was shortlisted for the 94th Academy Awards. The film was screened at the Dallas International Film Festival, the Pune International Film Festival, the Rajasthan International Film Festival, the Jagran Film Festival, the 15th Indian Film Festival of Ireland, the LIFE AFTER OIL International Film Festival and the Indian Film Festival of Houston.

The film was expected to release in theaters in December 2023, but it was postponed to 23 February 2024. The official poster of the film was released on 1 February featuring Prabhavalkar and Hattangadi with an hour glass seen in the title and the passing of the time, along with the tagline, "If you want a happy ending, you must know where to end the story" Subsequently, a 1-minute and 20 second trailer was released on 9 February 2024, captioned, "Why can't we die with dignity?", which attracted audiences. After the trailer launch, Hema Malini highlighted the importance of this film through a video and appealed viewers to watch the film.

=== Home media ===
The film was available for streaming on Ultra Jhakaas.

== Reception ==
Kalpeshraj Kubal of The Times of India praised the performances of the protagonists, the simple and realistic approach, and concluded "Aata Vel Zaali makes you think hard though, not just on the topic it addresses, but also on the life of elderly people in general. For that, the treatment of the film and for the performances, this one is worth a watch", rating the film 3 out of 5 stars. Deepa Gahlot of Scroll.in wrote "The film ends up making light of a situation that may be vital for some people. Perhaps without intending to, Aata Vel Zaali, like the Japanese classic The Ballad Of Narayama or the more recent Plan 75 and the Malayalam-language Thalaikoothal suggests that the elderly are a burden on society". Sakal wrote "Where advancing age, illness, love for each other and choosing the end of life with dignity come to the fore. Without any pretense, with a subtle and effective setting, the film inspires the audience and becomes a topic of discussion".

== Accolades ==
| Award | Year | Category | Recipient(s) | Result | Ref. |
|---|---|---|---|---|---|
| Pune International Film Festival | 2023 | Best Actor | Dilip Prabhavalkar | Won | |
| Rajasthan International Film Festival | 2023 | Best Regional Film | Aata Vel Zaali (It's Time to Go!) | Won | |
| Rajasthan International Film Festival | 2023 | Best Director | Ananth Mahadevan | Won | |
| Sharjah International Film Festival | 2023 | Honorable Mention Fiction Feature | Aata Vel Zaali (It's Time to Go!) | Won | |
| Indian Film Festival of Houston | 2024 | Special Recognition | Aata Vel Zaali (It's Time to Go!) | Won | |
| Maharashtra State Film Awards | 2024 | Best Debut Film Production | Aata Vel Zaali | Won | |
