= Filmfare Award for Best Background Score – Marathi =

Indian award for Marathi language films

Filmfare Marathi Awards for Best Background Score
- Awarded for: Best Performance by a Background Scorer
- Country: India
- Presented by: Filmfare
- First award: Monty Sharma, Rege (2014)
- Currently held by: Ilaiyaraaja, Gondhal (2025)
- Website: Filmfare Awards

The Filmfare Marathi Award for Best Background Score is given by the Filmfare magazine as part of its annual Filmfare Awards for Marathi films.

== Winner and nominees ==
=== 2010s ===
Year	Recipient(s)	Film
2014	Monty Sharma	Rege
2014	Chaitanya Adkar	Postcard
2014	Kaushal Inamdar	Yellow
2014	Narendra Bhide	Elizbeth Ekadashi
2014	Saket Kanetkar	Astu
2015	Santosh Mulekar	Katyar Kaljat Ghusli
2016	Ajay-Atul	Sairat
2016	Ajit Parab	Natsamrat
2016	Mannan Munjal	Kaul: A Calling
2016	Rohan-Rohan	Ventilator
2016	Saurabh Bhalerao	YZ
2016	Troy Arif	Half Ticket
2017	Utkarsh Dhotekar, Ranjan Pattnayak, Tony Basumatary	Lapachhapi
2017	Saket Kanetkar	Kaasav
2017	Aditya Bedekar	Hampi
2017	Anurag Saikia	Manjha
2017	Gandhaar	Ringan

=== 2020s ===
Year	Recipient(s)	Film
2020	Saurabh Bhalerao	Girlfriend
2020	Saurabh Bhalerao	Anandi Gopal
2020	Susmit Limaye	Baba
2020	Abhinay Jagtap	Sur Sapata
2020	Narendra Bhide	Hirkani
2020	Vijay Narayan Gavande	Bandishala
2021	AV Prafullachandra	Dhurala
2021	Aditya Bedekar	Jhimma
2021	Aditya Bedekar, Rohit Nagbhide	Mhorkya
2021	Sarang Kulkarni	Karkhanisanchi Waari
2021	Ranjan Patnaik, Brianca Bora	Bali
2021	Honey Satamkar	Bhonga
2022 (7th)	AV Prafullachandra	Godavari
2022 (7th)	Debarpito Saha	Pondicherry
2022 (7th)	Sarang Kulkarni, Saurabh Bhalerao	Me Vasantrao
2022 (7th)	Hitesh Modak	Pangharun
2022 (7th)	Saurabh Bhalerao	Medium Spicy
2022 (7th)	Parag Chhabra	Y
2023 (8th)	Gulraj Singh	Unaad
2023 (8th)	Aditya Bedekar	Jhimma 2
2023 (8th)	Advait Nemlekar	Naal 2
2023 (8th)	Saket Kanetkar	Aatmapamphlet
2023 (8th)	Saket Kanetkar, Abha Soumitra	Shyamchi Aai
2023 (8th)	Vijay Narayan Gavande	Baaplyok
2024 (9th)	Gulraj Singh	Paani
2024 (9th)	Hitesh Modak	Juna Furniture
2024 (9th)	Avinash-Vishwajeet	Dharmaveer 2
2024 (9th)	Avinash–Vishwajeet	Phullwanti
2024 (9th)	Amol Dadhphale, Johann Mathew, Bhushan Mate	Amaltash
2025 (10th)	Ilaiyaraaja	Gondhal
2025 (10th)	AV Prafullachandra	Dashavatar
2025 (10th)	AV Prafullachandra	Jarann
2025 (10th)	Jerry Silvester Vincent	April May 99
2025 (10th)	Saurabh Bhalerao	Ata Thambaycha Naay!

== See also ==
- Filmfare Awards Marathi
- Filmfare Awards
- Filmfare Award for Best Male Playback Singer – Marathi
- Filmfare Award for Best Female Playback Singer – Marathi
- Filmfare Award for Best Music Director – Marathi
