= Lata Bhagwan Kare =

2020 Marathi biographical film by Naveen Deshaboina

- Official Poster
- Original title: लता भगवान करे
- Directed by: Naveen Deshaboina
- Written by: Naveen Deshaboina
- Screenplay by: Naveen Deshaboina
- Produced by: Arrabothu Krishna
- Starring: Ajay Shinde; Bhagwan Kare; Lata Kare
- Cinematography: Adithya Sangare, Kamalesh Sangare
- Edited by: Boddu Shiva Kumar
- Music by: Prashant Mahamuni
- Production company: Param Jyothi Creations
- Release date: 17 January 2020
- Running time: 154 minutes
- Country: India
- Language: Marathi

Lata Bhagwan Kare is a 2020 Indian Marathi biographical film directed by Naveen Deshaboina. The film is based on the life of Lata Bhagwan Kare, who participated in a marathon at the age of 65 for her husband's medical treatment. It received the National Film Award – Special Mention at the 67th National Film Awards.

The lead role of Lata was played by Lata Kare herself.

== Plot ==
The film is based on 60-year old woman, who suffers from financial crisis and won a marathon to earn money for the treatment of her husband, who suffers from serious disease.

== Music ==
The film has two songs: Neela Thujala and Jayache Kshitija which are composed by Prashant Mahamuni. The lyrics of the songs are also penned by Prashant.

== Reception ==
Rishabh Deb writing for The Times of India gave 2.5 rating out of 5, and noted that the story of Lata Bhagwan Kare comes through "quite effectively on the silver screen". He further added that "several scenes in the film will have a long-lasting impact on the audience. Since the characters are real, the impact becomes stronger. The struggle, pain and instances from Lata's life are so real that one doesn't mind minor glitches in dubbing and cinematography. Surprisingly, Lata and all other cast have done a convincing job playing and re-living the same emotions on the screen. The film will have a deep impact on the audience and it is a must-watch for those who want to know about the inspiring woman Lata Bhagwan Kare".

== Awards and accolades ==
Year	Award	Category	Result	Ref.
2020	National Film Awards	National Film Award – Special Mention	Won	
2022	Filmfare Marathi Awards	Filmfare Marathi Awards - Best Debut Director	Won	
