= Ghaath (2023 film) =

2023 Marathi thriller drama film

- Theatrical Poster
- Directed by: Chhatrapal Ninawe
- Screenplay by: Chhatrapal Ninawe; Vikas Mudki
- Produced by: Shiladitya Bora; Manish Mundra; Milapsinh Jadeja; Sanyukta Gupta
- Starring: Jitendra Joshi; Milind Shinde; Janardan Kadam; Dhananjay Mandaokar; Suruchi Adarkar
- Cinematography: Udit Khurana
- Edited by: Navnita Sen
- Music by: Madhur Padwal
- Production companies: Platoon One Films; Drishyam Films; PayTamasha; Lighthouse Innoventures; UA Kathachitra
- Release dates: 18 February 2023 (Berlinale); 27 September 2024 (Theatrical)
- Running time: 126 minutes
- Country: India
- Language: Marathi

Ghaath (transl. Ambush) is a 2023 Indian Marathi-language crime thriller film, film written and directed by Chhatrapal Ninawe in his debut feature and starring Jitendra Joshi, Milind Shinde, Janardan Kadam, Dhananjay Mandaokar and Suruchi Adarkar. The film set in India's jungles, occupied by Maoist rebels, and revolves around the tense interplay between guerrillas, civilians and the police.

It is nominated to compete for the Panorama Audience Award at the 73rd Berlin International Film Festival, where it had its world premiere on 18 February 2023. Chhatrapal Ninawe, the first feature director is also nominated for GWFF Best First Feature Award in the festival. The film was released on 27 September 2024 in theatres. At the 9th Filmfare Awards Marathi, the film won 4 awards, notably Best Film Critics and Best Actor Critics for Joshi.

== Cast ==
- Jitendra Joshi as Assistant Commissioner Police
- Milind Shinde as Raghunath
- Janardan Kadam as Perku
- Dhananjay Mandaokar as Falgun
- Suruchi Adarkar as Kusari
- Sangramsingh Thakur as Shiva

== Production ==
In 2020, the film was selected for the National Film Development Corporation of India's (NFDC) 'Work-In-Progress (WIP) Lab' and won the Prasad Lab DI and Qube Moviebuff Appreciation awards presented in January 2021.

Initially produced by Jio Studios and Drishyam Films the film was completed in 2021. It was selected as one of the Panorama titles in 2021, but withdrawn by then producers Jio Studios due to some dispute with co-producer Drishyam Films. Written and directed by Chhatrapal Ninawe in his debut feature, the film is set in Maharashtra's Naxal-affected region. Based on the lives of tribal people, police and Naxalites, it is now jointly produced by Platoon One Films, Drishyam Films, PayTamasha, Lighthouse Innoventures and UA Kathachitra.

== Release ==
The film was selected as one of the Panorama titles in 2021, but it was pulled by then producers Jio Studios due to some dispute with co-producer Drishyam Films. Now, Ghaath had its premiere on 22 February 2023 as part of the 73rd Berlin International Film Festival, in Panorama. It is slated for summer 2023 release.

The film is set to be released in theatres on 27 September 2024.

== Reception ==
William Stottor of Loud and Clear rated the film 3.5 stars out of 5 and wrote, "Ninawe’s screenplay is generally well-structured, although it takes too much time for these characters to finally converge." Writing about the climax he stated, "it is executed in swift, unerring fashion." Stottor then said, "This holds the film back from a true whiplash moment to compound the terror of war, but the underlying currents of despair and death still run strong." Lida Bach of movie break rated the film 6.5 stars out of 10 and wrote, "In pale light and desaturated colors, Chhatrapal Ninawe draws a triptych of unscrupulous depravity that, despite bloody accents, places more value on psychological precision than action." Concluding Bach said, "Subtle symbolism and twists used sparingly, but effectively, increase the smoldering tension of the crime thriller gem played with naturalistic sobriety."

Meenkashi Shedde wrote in Mid day "Indian cinema, especially the parallel cinema movement that peaked in the 1970s and ’80s, has a long history of films dealing with indigenous people, scheduled castes and tribes. These include Satyajit Ray’s Sadgati, Govind Nihalani's Aakrosh and Hazaar Chaurasi Ki Maa, Mrinal Sen’s Mrigayaa, and his trilogy Interview, Calcutta 71 and Padatik (Bengali) that comment on the Naxalite movement; Goutam Ghose’s Paar and Buddhadeb Dasgupta’s Charachar, to more recent films like Lijo Jose Pellissery’s Churuli (Malayalam). But Ghaath is an original voice: the Nagpur-based Ninawe is from the Halba-Koshti indigenous community himself, and so offers us an ‘insider’s’ viewpoint on the community."

Sadia Khalid Reeti of German daily Tagesspiegel wrote "It's a jungle far removed from the fictional plains of Kipling. Even Bagheera couldn't protect these unfortunate man-cubs caught between the battle of ideologies. Characters from both sides are pathologically cruel, executing friends in the blink of an eye, without flinching, in the name of greater good or revenge or simply because their purpose has been served and they know too much to be trusted. We, however, never learn why they are fighting; what is at the root of this ideology that sets them apart, justifies all these killings in their minds." Prathap Nair wrote "The result is a gripping two-hour long tour de force in which the basic human instinct of survival trumps moral or ethical conundrums. As the state machinery languorously labours on, justice in the jungle is often accompanied by brutality. Added to that, sometimes even the jungle as a force of nature metes out justice on its own. Using Ghaath, Ninawe dissects all these themes alongside the perils of lawlessness in guerilla warfare and how it crosses with the plights of ordinary indigenous lives."

== Accolades ==
Award	Date	Category	Recipient	Result	Ref.
Berlin International Film Festival	26 February 2023	Panorama Audience Award for Best Feature Film	Ghaath	Nominated	
Berlin International Film Festival	26 February 2023	GWFF Best First Feature Award	Chhatrapal Ninawe	Nominated	
Berlin International Film Festival	26 February 2023	Best Director, 15th Giuseppe Becce Award	Chhatrapal Ninawe	Won	
Filmfare Marathi Awards	10 July 2025	Best Film: Critics	Chhatrapal Ninawe	Won	
Filmfare Marathi Awards	10 July 2025	Best Original Story	Chhatrapal Ninawe	Won	
Filmfare Marathi Awards	10 July 2025	Best Actor: Critics	Jitendra Joshi	Won	
Maharashtra State Film Awards	9 September 2026	Best Film	Ghaath	Nominated	
Maharashtra State Film Awards	9 September 2026	Best Director	Chhatrapal Ninawe	Nominated	
Maharashtra State Film Awards	9 September 2026	Best Story	Chhatrapal Ninawe	Nominated	
Maharashtra State Film Awards	9 September 2026	Best Screenplay	Chhatrapal Ninawe	Nominated	
Maharashtra State Film Awards	9 September 2026	Best Actor	Milind Shinde	Nominated	
Maharashtra State Film Awards	9 September 2026	Best Actress	Suruchi Adarkar	Nominated	
Maharashtra State Film Awards	9 September 2026	Best Supporting Actor	Dhananjay Mandaokar	Won	
Maharashtra State Film Awards	9 September 2026	Best Supporting Actor	Janardhan Kadam	Nominated	
