= Paani (film) =

Indian Marathi language film by Adinath Kothare

- Theatrical release poster
- Directed by: Adinath M. Kothare
- Written by: Nitin Dixit
- Produced by: Priyanka Chopra Jonas; Madhu Chopra; Neha Barjatya; Rajjat Barjatya; Mahesh Kothare; Siddharth Chopra
- Starring: Adinath Kothare; Rucha Vaidya; Subodh Bhave; Kishor Kadam; Rajit Kapur
- Cinematography: Arjun Sorte
- Edited by: Mayur Hardas; Adinath Kothare
- Music by: Gulraj Singh
- Production companies: Purple Pebble Pictures; Rajshri Entertainment; Kothare Vision
- Release date: 18 October 2024
- Running time: 148 minutes
- Country: India
- Language: Marathi

Paani (transl. Water) is an Indian Marathi-language drama film directed by Adinath Kothare and produced by Priyanka Chopra Jonas and Madhu Chopra under the banner of Purple Pebble Pictures. The film stars Addinath Kothare and Rucha Vaidya in Lead roles, While Subodh Bhave and Kishor Kadam appears in supporting roles. In 2019, the film won the National Film Awards for Best Film on Environment Conservation. Paani was released theatrically on 18 October 2024. The film is based on the real-life efforts of activist Hanumant Kendre to improve the water supply in his drought-prone village in the Marathwada district.

== Plot ==
Addinath aka Hanumant Babu Kendre is an ordinary man living in a Nagderwadi, a village in Nanded, plagued with drought. Paani follows his journey towards making the village independent of water, all while dealing with local goons, a budding romance, and other disruptions of daily life. Hanumant Kendre's marriage got called off by the girl Suvarna's family due to water crisis in his drought prone village. Hanumant promised the girl that he would marry her the day he resolves this crisis in his village. "Will you wait for me?" He asked. What unfolded ahead is a breathtaking true story of human endeavour driven by love.

== Cast ==
- Subodh Bhave as Balaji Kendre
- Kishor Kadam as Tatya
- Adinath Kothare as Hanumant
- Rucha Vaidya as Suvarna
- Rajit Kapur
- Nitin Dixit
- Sachin Goswami
- Mohanabai,
- Shripad Joshi
- Vikas Pandurang Patil.

== Release ==
The film was screened at New York Film Festival in the United States of America and was awarded the Best Film on Environment/Conservation/Preservation at the 66th National Film Awards in 2019. The film was theatrically released on 18 October 2024.

== Soundtrack ==
Track listing
No.	Title	Lyrics	Music	Singer(s)	Length
1.	"Paani - Title Track"	Adinath Kothare	Gulraj Singh	Shankar Mahadevan	3:35
2.	"Tujhya Sathin"	Adinath Kothare	Gulraj Singh	Gulraj Singh; Shashaa Tirupati	2:56
3.	"Nachnar"	Manoj Yadav	Gulraj Singh	Aanandi Joshi; Adarsh Shinde	3:14
Total length:					09:45

== Awards ==
Year	Ceremony	Category	Recipient	Result	Ref.
2019	66th National Film Awards	Best Film on Environment Conservation/Preservation	Producer:Purple Pebble Pictures Director:Adinath Kothare	Won	
2019	New York Indian Film Festival	Best Actor	Adinath Kothare	Won	
2025	Maharashtra Times Sanman Awards	Best Film	Adinath Kothare	Won	
2025	Maharashtra Times Sanman Awards	Best Director	Adinath Kothare	Won	
2025	Maharashtra Times Sanman Awards	Best Writing	Nitin Dixit	Won	
2025	Maharashtra Times Sanman Awards	Best Music	Gulraj Singh	Won	
2025	Filmfare Awards Marathi	Best Film	Paani	Won	
2025	Filmfare Awards Marathi	Best Director	Adinath Kothare	Won	
2025	Filmfare Awards Marathi	Best Editing	Mayur Hardas	Won	
2025	Filmfare Awards Marathi	Best Screenplay	Nitin Dixit	Won	
2025	Filmfare Awards Marathi	Best Background Score	Gulraj Singh	Won	
2025	Filmfare Awards Marathi	Best Sound Design	Amol Bhave	Won	

== Reception ==
=== Critical reception ===
Siddhant Adlakha of Firstpost stated, "On paper, Paani amounts to a linear tale of steely determination overcoming the odds. However, in Adinath Kothare’s hands, it’s a nuanced character piece." Nandini Ramnath of Scroll.in wrote, "Despite being far too long and repetitive for its own good, the 148-minute Paani achieves what it sets out to do: it shows how a village joins forces to defeat a long-standing problem. Nitin Dixit’s screenplay laces a predictable plot with rich local flavour, which is enhanced by the Marathi dialect spoken in Marathwada. Ganesh Matkari of The Hollywood Reporter India called it a "balanced environmental drama." He further wrote, "Paani is largely successful in creating a plausible portrayal of a real-life crisis."

=== Box office ===
The film earned ₹28 lakh net collection in its opening weekend.
