= List of accolades received by Gharat Ganpati =

Gharat Ganpati awards and nominations
Awards and nominations
Award	Wins	Nominations
City Cine Awards	1	4
Filmfare Awards Marathi	1	12
International Film Festival of India	1	1
International Iconic Awards Marathi	1	1
MaTa Sanman	1	10
Maharashtra State Film Awards	2	3
National Film Awards	1	1
NDTV Marathi Entertainment Awards	3	16
Zee 24 Taas Marathi Sanman	2	2
Zee 24 Taas Marathi Sanman	2	16

Totals (Note: Certain award groups do not simply award one winner. They acknowledge several different recipients, have runners-up, and have third place. Since this is a specific recognition and is different from losing an award, runner-up mentions are considered wins in this award tally. For simplification and to avoid errors, each award in this list has been presumed to have had a prior nomination.)
- Wins: 15
- Nominations: 66

Gharat Ganpati is a 2024 Indian Marathi-language family drama film directed by Navjyot Bandiwadekar in his directorial debut, from a story he co-wrote with Alok Sutar. Produced by Kumar Mangat Pathak, Abhishek Pathak, Namrata Bandiwadekar, Navjyot Bandiwadekar and Gauri Kalelkar Choudhari under the banners of Panorama Studios and Navigns Studio, the film features an ensemble cast of Bhushan Pradhan, Nikita Dutta, Ajinkya Deo, Ashwini Bhave, Sanjay Mone, Shubhangi Latkar, Shubhangi Gokhale, Sushma Deshpande and Sharad Bhutadiya. Set in the Konkan, it follows three generations of the Gharat family, who reunite at their ancestral home for the household's annual Gauri Ganpati celebrations and confront the differences that have grown between them. The film's music was composed by Sanket Sane, with cinematography by Shelly Sharma and Prasad Bhende and editing by Ashish Mhatre.

Gharat Ganpati was released theatrically on 26 July 2024 to positive reviews from critics and grossed over ₹4.75 crore worldwide. It went on to receive 66 nominations from ten award ceremonies and festivals, of which it won 15. Playback singer Abhay Jodhpurkar and the song "Navasachi Gauri Mazi" account for the film's most decorated element, while Bandiwadekar's direction, Ashwini Bhave's supporting performance and Nikita Dutta's Marathi debut were the other most frequently cited aspects.

At the 72nd National Film Awards, Jodhpurkar won the Best Male Playback Singer award for "Navasachi Gauri Mazi". The film received three nominations at the 62nd Maharashtra State Film Awards, winning Best Film (second) and Best Director (second) for Bandiwadekar.

Among industry ceremonies, Gharat Ganpati was nominated for a leading 16 awards at the 25th Zee Chitra Gaurav Puraskar and won two Best Supporting Actress for Bhave and Best Art Director for Sumeet Patil. It also received 16 nominations at the NDTV Marathi Entertainment Awards, converting three into wins: Best Debut – Female for Dutta, Best Playback Singer – Male for Jodhpurkar and Best Music Album for Sane. At the 9th Filmfare Awards Marathi, the film earned 12 nominations, including Best Film, with Bandiwadekar winning the Best Debut Director award. Of its ten nominations at the MaTa Sanman, Ashish Mhatre won Best Editing.

The film's other honours include Best Lyricist for Sameer Samant at the City Cine Awards, Best Cinematography for Prasad Bhende at the International Iconic Awards Marathi, and wins for both Dutta and Jodhpurkar at the Zee 24 Taas Marathi Sanman.

== Awards and nominations ==
Award	Year	Category	Nominee (s)	Result	Ref.
City Cine Awards	2024	Best Director	Navjyot Bandiwadekar	Nominated	
City Cine Awards	2024	Best Lyricist	Sameer Samant (song "Navasachi Gauri Mazi")	Won	
City Cine Awards	2024	Best Singer Male	Abhay Jodhpurkar (song "Navasachi Gauri Mazi")	Nominated	
City Cine Awards	2024	Best Singer Female	Sayali Khare (song "Vasarachi Aai")	Nominated	
International Film Festival of India	2024	Best Debut Director	Navjyot Bandiwadekar	Won	
International Iconic Awards Marathi	2024	Best Cinematography	Prasad Bhende	Won	
Zee Chitra Gaurav Puraskar	2025	Best Film	Gharat Ganpati	Nominated	
Zee Chitra Gaurav Puraskar	2025	Best Director	Navjyot Bandiwadekar	Nominated	
Zee Chitra Gaurav Puraskar	2025	Best Supporting Actor	Sanjay Mone	Nominated	
Zee Chitra Gaurav Puraskar	2025	Best Supporting Actress	Ashwini Bhave	Won	
Zee Chitra Gaurav Puraskar	2025	Best Supporting Actress	Shubhangi Gokhale	Nominated	
Zee Chitra Gaurav Puraskar	2025	Best Comedian – Male	Sameer Khandekar	Nominated	
Zee Chitra Gaurav Puraskar	2025	Best Music Director	Sanket Sane	Nominated	
Zee Chitra Gaurav Puraskar	2025	Best Background Music	Sanket Sane	Nominated	
Zee Chitra Gaurav Puraskar	2025	Best Playback Singer – Male	Abhay Jodhpurkar (song "Navasachi Gauri Mazi")	Nominated	
Zee Chitra Gaurav Puraskar	2025	Best Playback Singer – Female	Sayali Khare (song "Vasarachi Aai")	Nominated	
Zee Chitra Gaurav Puraskar	2025	Best Cinematographer	Shelly Sharma, Prasad Bhende	Nominated	
Zee Chitra Gaurav Puraskar	2025	Best Makeup Artist	Rajesh Walve	Nominated	
Zee Chitra Gaurav Puraskar	2025	Best Custom	Aparna Surve, Mahesh Sherla	Nominated	
Zee Chitra Gaurav Puraskar	2025	Best Art Director	Dr. Sumeet Patil	Won	
Zee Chitra Gaurav Puraskar	2025	Best Story	Navjyot Bandiwadekar, Alok Sutar	Nominated	
Zee Chitra Gaurav Puraskar	2025	Best Screenplay	Navjyot Bandiwadekar, Alok Sutar, Vaibhav Chinchalkar	Nominated	
NDTV Marathi Entertainment Awards	2025	Best Film	Gharat Ganpati	Nominated	
NDTV Marathi Entertainment Awards	2025	Best Director	Navjyot Bandiwadekar	Nominated	
NDTV Marathi Entertainment Awards	2025	Best Actor in a Leading Role	Bhushan Pradhan	Nominated	
NDTV Marathi Entertainment Awards	2025	Best Actress in a Leading Role	Nikita Dutta	Nominated	
NDTV Marathi Entertainment Awards	2025	Best Debut – Female	Nikita Dutta	Won	
NDTV Marathi Entertainment Awards	2025	Best Actor in a Supporting Role	Ajinkya Deo	Nominated	
NDTV Marathi Entertainment Awards	2025	Best Actress in a Supporting Role	Ashwini Bhave	Nominated	
NDTV Marathi Entertainment Awards	2025	Best Playback Singer – Male	Abhay Jodhpurkar (song "Navasachi Gauri Mazi")	Won	
NDTV Marathi Entertainment Awards	2025	Best Lyricist	Sameer Samant (song "Navasachi Gauri Mazi")	Nominated	
NDTV Marathi Entertainment Awards	2025	Best Music Album	Sanket Sane	Won	
NDTV Marathi Entertainment Awards	2025	Best Background Score	Sanket Sane	Nominated	
NDTV Marathi Entertainment Awards	2025	Best Story	Navjyot Bandiwadekar, Alok Sutar	Nominated	
NDTV Marathi Entertainment Awards	2025	Best Screenplay	Navjyot Bandiwadekar, Alok Sutar, Vaibhav Chinchalkar	Nominated	
NDTV Marathi Entertainment Awards	2025	Best Art Direction	Dr. Sumeet Patil	Nominated	
NDTV Marathi Entertainment Awards	2025	Best Editing	Ashish Mhatre	Nominated	
NDTV Marathi Entertainment Awards	2025	Best Custom Design	Aparna Guram, Mahesh Sherla	Nominated	
MaTa Sanman	2025	Best Film	Gharat Ganpati	Nominated	
MaTa Sanman	2025	Best Director	Navjyot Bandiwadekar	Nominated	
MaTa Sanman	2025	Best Supporting Actress	Ashwini Bhave	Nominated	
MaTa Sanman	2025	Best Lyricist	Sameer Samant (song "Navasachi Gauri Mazi")	Nominated	
MaTa Sanman	2025	Best Music Director	Sanket Sane	Nominated	
MaTa Sanman	2025	Best Playback Singer (Male)	Abhay Jodhpurkar (song "Navasachi Gauri Mazi")	Nominated	
MaTa Sanman	2025	Best Playback Singer (Female)	Sayali Khare (song "Vasarachi Aai")	Nominated	
MaTa Sanman	2025	Best Cinematography	Shelly Sharma, Prasad Bhende	Nominated	
MaTa Sanman	2025	Best Editing	Ashish Mhatre	Won	
MaTa Sanman	2025	Best Art Direction	Dr. Sumeet Patil	Nominated	
Filmfare Awards Marathi	2025	Best Film	Gharat Ganpati	Nominated	
Filmfare Awards Marathi	2025	Best Director	Navjyot Bandiwadekar	Nominated	
Filmfare Awards Marathi	2025	Best Director Debut	Navjyot Bandiwadekar	Won	
Filmfare Awards Marathi	2025	Best Supporting Actress	Ashwini Bhave	Nominated	
Filmfare Awards Marathi	2025	Best Music Director	Sanket Sane	Nominated	
Filmfare Awards Marathi	2025	Best Playback Singer – Male	Abhay Jodhpurkar (song "Navasachi Gauri Mazi")	Nominated	
Filmfare Awards Marathi	2025	Best Playback Singer – Female	Sayali Khare (song "Vasarachi Aai")	Nominated	
Filmfare Awards Marathi	2025	Best Story	Alok Sutar, Navjyot Bandiwadekar	Nominated	
Filmfare Awards Marathi	2025	Best Editing	Ashish Mhatre	Nominated	
Filmfare Awards Marathi	2025	Best Cinematography	Shelly Sharma, Prasad Bhende	Nominated	
Filmfare Awards Marathi	2025	Best Production Design	Dr. Sumeet Patil	Nominated	
Filmfare Awards Marathi	2025	Best Costume Design	Aparna Surve-Guram, Mahesh Sherla	Nominated	
Zee24Taas Marathi Sanman	2025	Best Debut (Female)	Nikita Dutta	Won	
Zee24Taas Marathi Sanman	2025	Best Playback Singer – Male	Abhay Jodhpurkar (song "Navasachi Gauri Mazi")	Won	
National Film Awards	2026	Best Male Playback Singer	Abhay Jodhpurkar (song "Navasachi Gauri Mazi")	Won	
Maharashtra State Film Awards	2026	Best Film II	Gharat Ganpati	Won	
Maharashtra State Film Awards	2026	Best Director II	Navjyot Bandiwadekar	Won	
Maharashtra State Film Awards	2026	Best Supporting Actress	Sushma Deshpande	Nominated	
