= 1st Filmfare Awards Marathi =

Indian film awards

1st Filmfare Marathi Awards
- Presented on: 20 November 2015
- Site: Thane
- Hosted by: Prasad Oak, Pushkar Shrotri, Kranti Redkar
- Organized by: Ajeenkya DY Patil University

Highlights
- Best Film: Dr. Prakash Baba Amte – The Real Hero
- Best Critic: Elizabeth Ekadashi, Postcard
- Most awards: Lai Bhaari (5)
- Most nominations: Elizabeth Ekadashi, Lai Bhaari (13)

Television coverage
- Network: Colors Marathi

The 1st Filmfare Marathi Awards is a ceremony, presented by Ajeenkya DY Patil University, that honored the best Indian Marathi-language films of 2014.

Elizabeth Ekadashi and Lai Bhaari led the ceremony with 13 nominations each, followed by Fandry with 11 nominations and Rege with 10 nominations.

Lai Bhaari won 5 awards, most in the music category, followed by Elizabeth Ekadashi, Fandry and Rege with 4 awards each. Dr. Prakash Baba Amte – The Real Hero won 3 awards, including Best Film, Best Actor and Best Actress.

== Ceremony ==
It was held at Thane, the 1st Filmfare Marathi Awards honored the films released in 2014. At a virtual press conference helmed by the editor of Filmfare magazine, Ajeenkya DY Patil University was revealed as the title sponsor. Actors Prasad Oak, Pushkar Shrotri and Kranti Redkar were announced as the co-hosts, while singers Vaishali Samant and actors Sachin Pilgaonkar, Amruta Khanvilkar, Nehha Pendse, Adinath Kothare, Sonalee Kulkarni and Manasi Naik performed during the event. Bollywood actors Tabu, Vidya Balan, Varun Dhawan and Urmila Matondkar were also present at the event. It took place on 20 November 2015, and was broadcast on 28 February 2017 on Colors Marathi.

== Winners and nominees ==
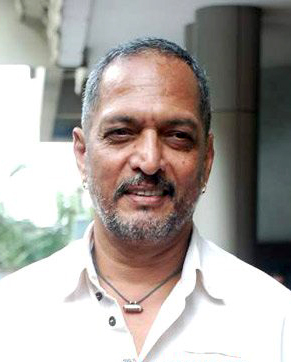
Nana Patekar – Best Actor

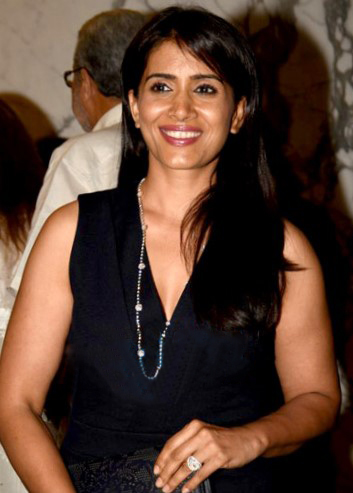
Sonali Kulkarni – Best Actress

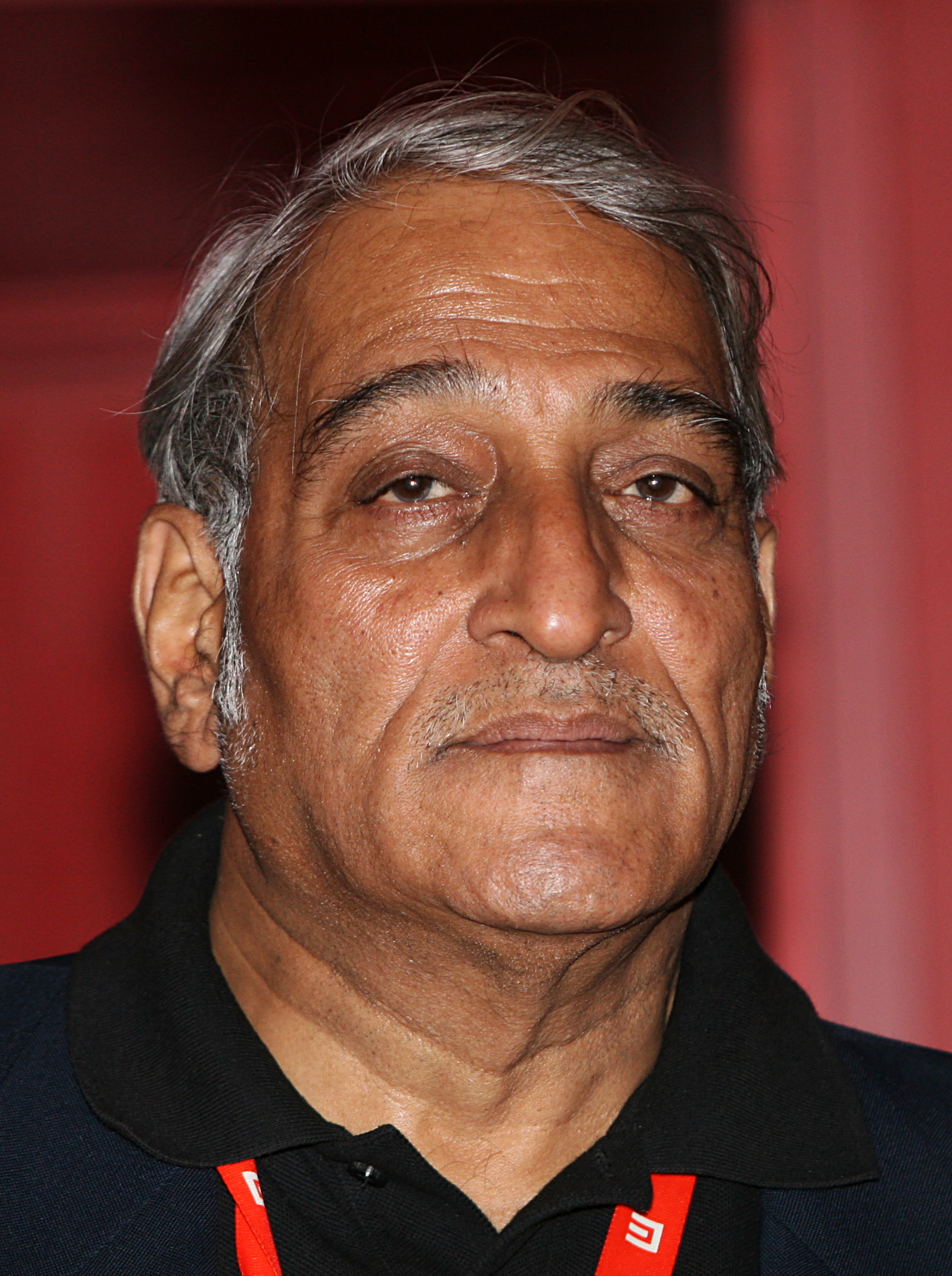
Mohan Agashe – Best Actor Critics

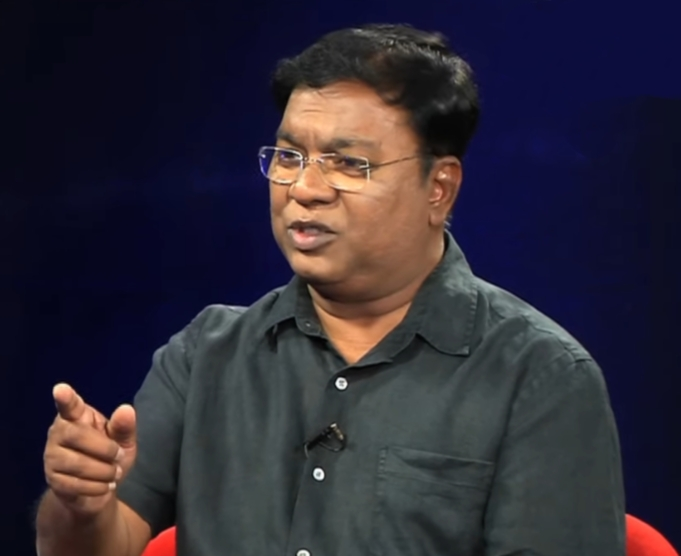
Kishor Kadam – Best Supporting Actor

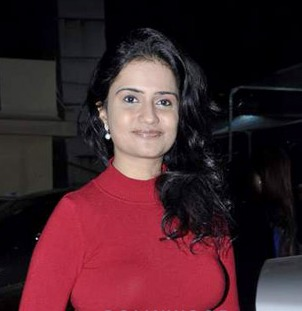
Amruta Subhash – Best Supporting Actress

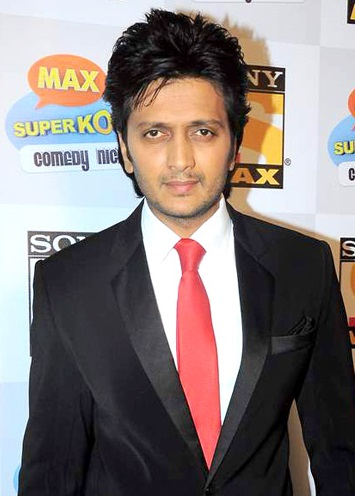
Riteish Deshmukh – Best Male Debut

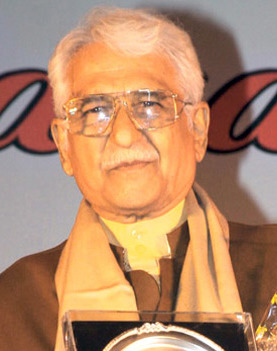
Ramesh Deo – Lifetime Achievement Award

Best Film	Best Director
Dr. Prakash Baba Amte – The Real Hero; Elizabeth Ekadashi; Fandry; Lai Bhaari; Rege; Yellow	Nagraj Manjule – Fandry; Abhijit Panse – Rege; Mahesh Limaye – Yellow; Nishikant Kamat – Lai Bhaari; Paresh Mokashi – Elizabeth Ekadashi; Samrudhi Porey – Dr. Prakash Baba Amte - The Real Hero
Best Actor	Best Actress
Nana Patekar – Dr. Prakash Baba Amte - The Real Hero as Dr. Prakash Baba Amte; Atul Kulkarni – Happy Journey as Niranjan; Girish Kulkarni – Postcard as postman; Mohan Agashe – Astu as Dr. Chakrapani Shastri; Riteish Deshmukh – Lai Bhaari as Mauli / Abhay Singh Nimbalkar	Sonali Kulkarni – Dr. Prakash Baba Amte - The Real Hero as Mandakini Amte; Iravati Harshe – Astu as Ira; Mrinal Kulkarni – Yellow as Mughdha; Priya Bapat – Happy Journey as Janaki; Usha Naik – Ek Hazarachi Note as Budhi; Veena Jamkar – Taptapadi as Meera
Best Supporting Actor	Best Supporting Actress
Kishor Kadam – Fandry as Kachru Mane; Mahesh Manjrekar – Rege as Pradeep Sharma; Pushkar Shrotri – Rege as Sachin Waze; Sharad Kelkar – Lai Bhaari as Sangram; Upendra Limaye – Yellow as Pratap Sardeshmukh	Amruta Subhash – Astu as Channamma; Neena Kulkarni – Taptapadi as Durgabai; Smita Tambe – Candle March as Shabana; Tanvi Azmi – Lai Bhaari as Sumitra Devi; Nandita Dhuri – Elizabeth Ekadashi as Dnyanesh's mother
Best Male Debut	Best Female Debut
Riteish Deshmukh – Lai Bhaari as Mauli / Abhay Singh Nimbalkar	Parna Pethe – Rama Madhav as Ramabai Peshwa; Rajeshwari Kharat – Fandry as Shalini; Aditi Pohankar – Lai Bhaari as Nandini
Best Music Director	Best Lyricist
Ajay-Atul – Lai Bhaari; Chinar–Mahesh – Timepass; Anand Modak – Rama Madhav; Ajay Naik – Baavare Prem He; Mahesh Kulkarni – Happy Journey	Guru Thakur – "Mauli Mauli" – Lai Bhaari; Guru Thakur – "Mala Ved Lagale" – Timepass; Paresh Mokashi – "Dagad" – Elizabeth Ekadashi; Dasu Vaidya – "Mani Achanak" – Dusari Goshta; Prakash Holkar – "Don Disachi Sawli" – Tapaal; Sudhir Moghe – "Swapani Navhate Disale" – Rama Madhav
Best Playback Singer – Male	Best Playback Singer – Female
Ajay Gogavale – "Mauli Mauli" – Lai Bhaari; Hrishikesh Ranade – "Baavare Prem He" – Baavare Prem He; Swapnil Bandodkar – "Mala Ved Lagale" – Timepass; Ajay Gogavale – "Fandry" – Fandry; Mangesh Dhakade – "Mani Achanak" – Dusari Goshta	Ketaki Mategaonkar - "Mala Ved Lagale" - Timepass; Bela Shende – "Baavare Prem He" – Baavare Prem He; Vaishali Samant – "Don Disachi Sawli" – Tapaal; Madhura Datar – "Loot Liyo" – Rama Madhav; Kirti Killedar – "Mani Achanak" – Dusari Goshta

Critics' awards

Best Film
Paresh Mokashi – Elizabeth Ekadashi; Gajendra Ahire – Postcard
Best Actor	Best Actress
Mohan Agashe – Astu as Dr. Chakrapani Shastri	Usha Naik – Ek Hazarachi Note as Budhi

Technical Awards

Best Story	Best Screenplay
Madhugandha Kulkarni – Elizabeth Ekadashi; Kshitij Hitendra Thakur, Ambar Hadap, Ganesh Pandit, Mahesh Limaye – Yellow; Mangesh Hadawale – Tapaal; Nagraj Manjule – Fandry; Sachin Baliram Nagargoje – Taptapadi; Shrikant Bojewar – Ek Hazarachi Note	Paresh Mokashi – Elizabeth Ekadashi; Mangesh Hadawale – Tapaal; Nagraj Manjule – Fandry; Shrikant Bojewar – Ek Hazarachi Note
Best Dialogue	Best Editing
Madhugandha Kulkarni, Paresh Mokashi – Elizabeth Ekadashi; Madhugandha Kulkarni, Sachin Baliram Nagargoje – Taptapadi; Pravin Tarde, Abhijit Panse – Rege; Samruddhi Pore – Dr. Prakash Baba Amte - The Real Hero; Gajendra Ahire – Postcard	Dinesh Poojari – Rege; Jayant Jathar – Yellow; Aarif Sheikh – Lai Bhaari; Chandan Arora – Fandry; Rajesh Rao – Sau Shashi Deodhar
Best Choreography	Best Cinematography
Ganesh Acharya – "Aala Holicha San" – Lai Bhaari; Umesh Jadhav – "Ali Lahar Kela Kahar" – Pyar Vali Love Story; Umesh Jadhav – "Yaha Vaha Sara Jahan" – Pyar Vali Love Story; Saroj Khan – "Loot Liyo" – Rama Madhav	Vikram Amladi – Fandry; Laxman Utekar – Tapaal; Mahesh Limaye – Rege; Amol Gole – Elizabeth Ekadashi; Yogesh Rajguru – Postcard
Best Production Design	Best Sound Design
Nitin Chandrakant Desai – Rama Madhav; Santosh Phutane – Candle March; Sachin Bhilare – Elizabeth Ekadashi; Mahesh Gurunath – Vitti Dandu; Devdas Bhandare – Taptapadi	Rohit Pradhan – Rege; Anmol Bhave – Elizabeth Ekadashi; Sanjay Maurya, Allwyn Rego – Lai Bhaari; Nimish Chheda, Avinash Sonawne, Christopher Harvey – Fandry; Tushar Pandit – Postcard
Best Background Score
Monty Sharma – Rege; Chaitanya Adkar – Postcard; Narendra Bhide – Elizabeth Ekadashi; Kaushal Inamdar – Yellow; Saket Kanetkar – Astu

Special awards

Lifetime Achievement Award
- Ramesh Deo
Best Debut Director
- Abhijit Panse – Rege
- Mahesh Limaye - Yellow
Best Child Artist
- Somnath Awghade – Fandry as Jambuwant Kachru Mane
  - Nishant Bhavsar – Vitti Dandu as Govind
  - Rohit Utekar – Tapaal as Ranga
  - Shrirang Mahajan – Elizabeth Ekadashi as Dnyanesh
  - Gauri Gadgil – Yellow as Gauri
  - Shruti Kalsekar – Rama Madhav

== Superlatives ==
Multiple nominations
Nominations	Film
13	Elizabeth Ekadashi
13	Lai Bhaari
11	Fandry
10	Rege
9	Yellow
7	Rama Madhav
6	Postcard
6	Tapaal
5	Dr. Prakash Baba Amte – The Real Hero
5	Astu
5	Taptapadi
4	Ek Hazarachi Note
4	Timepass
3	Happy Journey
3	Baavare Prem He
3	Dusari Goshta

Multiple wins
Awards	Film
5	Lai Bhaari
4	Elizabeth Ekadashi
4	Fandry
4	Rege
3	Dr. Prakash Baba Amte – The Real Hero
2	Astu
2	Rama Madhav
