= Zee Chitra Gaurav Puraskar for Best Film =

Awards for best film

- Awarded for: Best Film
- Country: India
- Presented by: Zee Marathi
- First award: Bindhaast (2000)
- Currently held by: Ata Thambaycha Naay! (2026)

The Zee Chitra Gaurav Puraskar for Best Film is given by the Zee Marathi television network as part of its annual awards for Marathi Cinemas. The winners are selected by the jury members. The award was first given in 2000.

Here is a list of the award winners and the nominees of the respective years.

== Winners and nominees ==
Table key
‡	Indicates the winner

Year	Film	Production House / Studio	Ref.
2000 (1st)	Bindhaast ‡	Devyani Movies	
2001 (2nd)	Mrugjal ‡	Naveen Upadhyay	
2002 (3rd)	Ek Hoti Vadi‡	Nimbus Motion Pictures	
2003 (4th)	Bhet ‡	Everest Entertainment	
2004 (5th)	Shwaas ‡	Kathi Arts	
2005 (6th)	Uttarayan ‡	Sanjay Shetty Films	
2006 (7th)	Aamhi Asu Ladke ‡	Everest Entertainment	
2007 (8th)	Mission Champion‡	Sai Arts	
2008 (9th)	Aevdhese Aabhal ‡	Bipin Nadkarni	
2009 (10th)	Jogwa ‡	IDream Productions	
2009 (10th)	Mahasata	Pluss Entertainment	
2009 (10th)	Joshi Ki Kamble	Aadishakti Films	
2009 (10th)	Made In China	Elixiar Logics	
2009 (10th)	Gho Mala Asla Hava	KBC Productions	
2010 (11th)	Me Shivajiraje Bhosale Boltoy‡	Everest Entertainment	
2010 (11th)	Rita	Walkwater Media	
2010 (11th)	Natarang	Zee Talkies, Athaansh Communications	
2010 (11th)	Gandha	Sandeep Kankariya	
2011 (12th)	Shikshanachya Aaicha Gho ‡	Satya Films, Ashwami Productions, Everest Entertainment	
2011 (12th)	Mumbai-Pune-Mumbai	Mirah Entertainment	
2011 (12th)	Paradh	Amogh Cinetones	
2011 (12th)	Mee Sindhutai Sapkal	Siddhivinayak Cinevision	
2011 (12th)	Me, Mann Ani Dhruv	Millenium Entertainment	
2012 (13th)	Shala ‡	Great Maratha Entertainment, Navalakha Arts	
2012 (13th)	Taryanche Bait	ALT Entertainment	
2012 (13th)	Fakta Ladh Mhana	Startake Implex	
2012 (13th)	Balgandharva	Iconic Chandrakant Productions	
2012 (13th)	Sadrakshnay	J.J.Films	
2013 (14th)	Balak-Palak‡	Mumbai Film Company	
2013 (14th)	Tukaram	Everest Entertainment	
2013 (14th)	Kaksparsh	Great Maratha Entertainment	
2013 (14th)	Samhita - The Script	Mukta Arts	
2013 (14th)	Aayna Ka Bayna	Akshara Films Division	
2014 (15th)	Avatarachi Goshta‡	Asian Entertainment	
2014 (15th)	Fandry	Essel Vision Productions, Navlakha Arts, Holybasil Productions	
2014 (15th)	Duniyadari	Video Palace, Dreaming 24/7 Productions	
2014 (15th)	Rege	The Artbeat Innovations	
2014 (15th)	Astu	Gaurika Films	
2015 (16th)	Elizabeth Ekadashi‡	Essel Vision Productions, Mayasabha Productions	
2015 (16th)	Lai Bhaari	Mumbai Film Company	
2015 (16th)	Lokmanya: Ek Yugpurush	Neena Raut Films	
2015 (16th)	Happy Journey	Everest Entertainment	
2015 (16th)	Poshter Boyz	Affluence Movies	
2016 (17th)	Katyar Kaljat Ghusali‡	Essel Vision Productions	
2016 (17th)	Natsamrat	Fincraft Media Entertainment	
2016 (17th)	Double Seat	HUGE Productions, Pratisaad Productions	
2016 (17th)	Mitwaa	Minakshi Sagar Productions	
2016 (17th)	Sandook	Orajen Entertainment	
2017 (18th)	Sairat ‡	Zee Studios, Aatpat Productions	
2017 (18th)	Ventilator	Purple Pebble Pictures	
2017 (18th)	Kaasav	Vichitra Nirmiti	
2017 (18th)	Ubuntu	Fable Factory	
2017 (18th)	Take Care Good Night	S.P. Entertainment	
2018 (19th)	Muramba ‡	Dashami Creations, HUGE Productions, Pratisaad Productions	
2018 (19th)	Kachcha Limboo	Teamwork Ultra Creations	
2018 (19th)	Gachchi	Dashami Creations	
2018 (19th)	Ringan	Landmarc Films Representation	
2018 (19th)	Baapjanma	Sixteen by Sixty-four Productions	
2019 (20th)	Naal ‡	Zee Studios, Aatpat Productions	
2019 (20th)	Ani... Dr. Kashinath Ghanekar	Viacom18 Studios	
2019 (20th)	Mulshi Pattern	Genuine Productions, Punit Balan Entertainment	
2019 (20th)	Farzand	Swami Samarth Creations	
2019 (20th)	Nude	Zee Studios, Ravi Jadhav Films	
2020 (21st)	Aatpadi Nights ‡	Maydesh Studio	
2020 (21st)	Anandi Gopal	Zee Studios, Fresh Lime Films, Namah Creations	
2020 (21st)	Girlfriend	HUGE Productions, Pratisaad Productions, Triple Ace Entertainment	
2020 (21st)	Khari Biscuit	Zee Studios, Dreaming 24/7 Productions	
2020 (21st)	Baba	Sanjay Dutt Productions	
2021 (–)	Not Awarded due to COVID-19		
2022 (22nd)	Sairat ‡	Zee Studios, Aatpat Productions	
2023 (23rd)	Me Vasantrao ‡	Movietone Digital Entertainment	
2023 (23rd)	Ved	Mumbai Film Company	
2023 (23rd)	Godavari	Blue Drop Films, Jitendra Joshi Pictures	
2023 (23rd)	Goshta Eka Paithanichi	Planet Marathi	
2023 (23rd)	Y	Ctrln Productions	
2024 (24th)	Baaplyok ‡	99 Productions, Bahuroopi Productions	
2024 (24th)	Baipan Bhaari Deva	Jio Studios	
2024 (24th)	Aatmapamphlet	T-Series, Colour Yellow Productions, Zee Studios	
2024 (24th)	Vaalvi	Zee Studios	
2024 (24th)	Unaad	Jio Studios	
2025 (25th)	Paani ‡	Purple Pebble Pictures, Rajshri Entertainment, Kothare Vision	
2025 (25th)	Gharat Ganpati	Navigns Studio, Panorama Studios	
2025 (25th)	Amaltash	Darshan Productions, Medium Strong Productions, One Fine Day	
2025 (25th)	Juna Furniture	Skylink Entertainment, Satya Saiee Films	
2025 (25th)	Phullwanti	Panorama Studios, Mangesh Pawar & Company, Shivoham Creations Pvt. Ltd.	
2026 (26th)	Ata Thambaycha Naay! ‡	Chalk and Cheese Films, Film Jazz, Zee Studios	
2026 (26th)	Jarann	Anees Bazmee Productions, A & N Cinema's LLP, A3 Events & Media Services	
2026 (26th)	Sthal	Dhun Production	
2026 (26th)	Gondhal	Davakhar Films	
2026 (26th)	Uttar	Zee Studios, Jackpot Entertainmentss	
