= Filmfare Award for Best Costume Design – Marathi =

Indian award for Marathi language films

Filmfare Marathi Awards for Best Costume Design
- Awarded for: Best Performance by a Costume Designer
- Country: India
- Presented by: Filmfare
- First award: Vikram Phadnis, Hrudayantar (2017)
- Currently held by: Sachin Lovalekar, Dashavatar (2025)
- Website: Filmfare Awards

The Filmfare Marathi Award for Best Costume Design is given by the Filmfare magazine as part of its annual Filmfare Awards for Marathi films.

== Winner and nominees ==
=== 2010s ===
Year	Recipient(s)	Film	Ref.
2017	Vikram Phadnis	Hrudayantar	
2017	Pallavi Rajwade	Ti Saddhya Kay Karte	
2017	Nakshatra Dewadikar	Manjha	
2017	Sayli Soman	Hampi	

=== 2020s ===
Year	Recipient(s)	Film	Ref.
2020	Poornima Oak	Fatteshikast	
2020	Poornima Oak	Hirkani	
2020	Vikram Phadnis	Smile Please	
2020	Namdeo Waghmare	Aatpadi Nights	
2020	Sachin Lovalekar	Anandi Gopal	
2021	NOT AWARDED		
2022	Sachin Lovalekar	Me Vasantrao	
2022	Amit Divekar	Pondicherry	
2022	Nachiket Barve	Har Har Mahadev	
2022	Poornima Oak	Sher Shivraj	
2022	Manasi Attarde	Sarsenapati Hambirrao	
2022	Laxman Gollar	Panghrun	
2023	Namdeo Waghmare	Shyamchi Aai	
2023	Kalyani Gugle	Unaad	
2023	Sachin Lovalekar	Aatmapamphlet	
2023	Tanaji Jadhav	Subhedar	
2023	Yugesha Omkar	Maharashtra Shahir	
2024	Manasi Attarde	Phullwanti	
2024	Aparna Surve-Guram, Mahesh Sherla	Gharat Ganpati	
2024	Ganesh Lonare	Dharmarakshak Mahaveer Chhatrapati Sambhaji Maharaj	
2024	Rashmi Sawant, Manasi Attarde	Dharmaveer 2	
2024	Sneha Nikam	Sridevi Prasanna	
2024	Sachin Lovalekar	Swargandharva Sudhir Phadke	
2025	Sachin Lovalekar	Dashavatar	
2025	Sachin Lovalekar	Gondhal	
2025	Devika Kale-Chaudhary	Jarann	
2025	Kshitee Jog	Fussclass Dabhade	
2025	Sneha Nikam	Aarpar	

== See also ==
- Filmfare Awards Marathi
- Filmfare Awards
- Filmfare Award for Best Art Direction – Marathi
- Filmfare Award for Best Screenplay – Marathi
- Filmfare Award for Best Film – Marathi
