= Filmfare Award for Best Screenplay – Marathi =

Indian award for Marathi language films

Filmfare Marathi Awards for Best Screenplay
- Awarded for: Best Performance by a Screenplay Writer
- Country: India
- Presented by: Filmfare
- First award: Paresh Mokashi, Elizabeth Ekadashi (2014)
- Currently held by: Nikhil Mahajan, Prajakt Deshmukh, Godavari (2022)
- Website: Filmfare Awards

The Filmfare Marathi Award for Screenplay is given by the Filmfare magazine as part of its annual Filmfare Awards for Marathi films to recognise a writer who wrote a film's story.

== Winner and nominees ==
=== 2010s ===
Year	Recipient(s)	Film
2014	Paresh Mokashi	Elizabeth Ekadashi
2014	Mangesh Hadawale	Tapaal
2014	Nagraj Manjule	Fandry
2014	Shrikant Bojewar	Ek Hazarachi Note
2015	Ashwini Sidwani, Gajendra Ahire	The Silence
2016	Rajesh Mapuskar	Ventilator
2016	Mahesh Manjrekar, Abhijeet Deshpande	Natsamrat
2016	Nagraj Manjule	Sairat
2016	Sachin Kundalkar	Vazandar
2017	Kshitij Patwardhan	Faster Fene
2017	Varun Narvekar	Muramba
2017	Vikram Phadnis, Saurabh Bhave	Hrudayantar
2017	Jatin Wagle	Manjha
2017	Manaswini Lata Ravindra	Ti Saddhya Kay Karte

=== 2020s ===
Year	Recipient(s)	Film
2020	Karan Sharma	Anandi Gopal
2020	Manish Singh	Baba
2020	Nitin Supekar	Aatpadi Nights
2020	Upendra Sidhaye	Girlfriend
2020	Vikram Phadnis, Irawati Karnik	Smile Please
2021	Chaitanya Tamhane	The Disciple
2021	Amar Deokar	Mhorkya
2021	Arvind Jagtap	Basta
2021	Irawati Karnik	Jhimma
2021	Shailesh Narwade	Jayanti
2021	Shivaji Patil, D Nishant	Bhonga
2022 (7th)	Nikhil Mahajan, Prajakt Deshmukh	Godavari
2022 (7th)	Trushant Ingle	Zollywood
2022 (7th)	Nipun Dharmadhikari	Me Vasantrao
2022 (7th)	Irawati Karnik	Sunny
2022 (7th)	Ajit Wadikar, Swapneel Sojwal, Sandeep Dandwate	Y
2022 (7th)	Mahesh Manjrekar, Ganesh Matkari	Pangharun
2023 (8th)	Madhugandha Kulkarni, Paresh Mokashi	Vaalvi
2023 (8th)	Aditya Sarpotdar, Saurabh Bhave	Unaad
2023 (8th)	Makarand Mane, Vitthal Kale	Baaplyok
2023 (8th)	Paresh Mokashi	Aatmapamphlet
2023 (8th)	Sudhakar Reddy Yakkanti	Naal 2
2023 (8th)	Vaishali Naik	Baipan Bhaari Deva
2024 (9th)	Nitin Dixit	Paani
2024 (9th)	Aditi Moghe	Sridevi Prasanna
2024 (9th)	Chhatrapal Anand Ninawe	Ghaath
2024 (9th)	Mahesh Manjrekar	Juna Furniture
2024 (9th)	Snehal Tarde	Phullwanti
2024 (9th)	Varun Narvekar, Nipun Dharmadhikari	Ek Don Teen Chaar
2025 (10th)	Santosh Davkhar	Gondhal
2025 (10th)	Gaurav Patki	Aarpar
2025 (10th)	Jayant Digambar Somalkar	Sthal
2025 (10th)	Rohan Mapuskar, Kunala Pawar, Bimal Oberoi	April May 99
2025 (10th)	Hrishikesh Gupte	Jarann
2025 (10th)	Shivraj Waichal, Omkar Gokhale, Arvind Jagtap	Ata Thambaycha Naay!
2025 (10th)	Subodh Khanolkar	Dashavtar

== See also ==
- Filmfare Awards Marathi
- Filmfare Awards
- Filmfare Award for Best Director – Marathi
- Filmfare Award for Best Story – Marathi
