= Filmfare Award for Best Story – Marathi =

Annual film writer award in India

Filmfare Marathi Awards for Best Story
- Awarded for: Best Performance by a Story Writer
- Country: India
- Presented by: Filmfare
- First award: Madhugandha Kulkarni, Elizabeth Ekadashi (2014)
- Website: Filmfare Awards

The Filmfare Marathi Award for Best Story is given by Filmfare magazine as part of its annual Filmfare Awards for Marathi films, to recognise a writer who wrote a film's story.

== Winner and nominees ==
=== 2010s ===
Year	Recipient(s)	Film
2014	Madhugandha Kulkarni	Elizabeth Ekadashi
2014	Uttung Hitendra Thakur, Ambar Hadap, Ganesh Pandit, Mahesh Limaye	Yellow
2014	Mangesh Hadawale	Tapaal
2014	Nagraj Manjule	Fandry
2014	Sachin Baliram Nagargoje	Taptapadi
2014	Shrikant Bojewar	Ek Hazarachi Note
2015	Nitin S Adsul	Partu
2016	Rajesh Mapuskar	Ventilator
2016	Chinmay Patankar	Rangaa Patangaa
2016	Hemant Dhome	Poster Girl
2016	Nagraj Manjule	Sairat
2016	Sachin Kundalkar	Vazandar
2017	Makarand Mane	Ringan
2017	Nipun Dharmadhikari	Baapjanma
2017	Rajan Khan	Halal
2017	Varun Narvekar	Muramba
2017	Vikram Phadnis	Hrudayantar
2017	Vishal Furia	Lapachhapi

=== 2020s ===
Year	Recipient(s)	Film
2020	Manish Singh	Baba
2020	Digpal Lanjekar	Fatteshikast
2020	Nitin Supekar	Aatpadi Nights
2020	Upendra Sidhaye	Girlfriend
2020	Vikram Phadnis	Smile Please
2021	Achyut Narayana	Vegali Vaat
2021	Amar Deokar	Mhorkya
2021	Chaitanya Tamhane	The Disciple
2021	Hemant Dhome	Jhimma
2021	Kshitij Patwardhan	Dhurala
2021	Shivaji Patil	Bhonga
2022(7th)	Shantanu Ganesh Rode	Goshta Eka Paithanichi
2022(7th)	Nikhil Mahajan, Prajakt Deshmukh	Godavari
2022(7th)	Tejas Modak, Sachin Kundalkar	Pondicherry
2022(7th)	Hemant Dhome	Sunny
2022(7th)	Dr. Salil Kulkarni	Ekda Kay Zala
2022(7th)	B.B.Borkar	Pangharun
2023 (8th)	Ashish Avinash Bende	Aatmapamphlet
2023 (8th)	Aditya Sarpotdar, Saurabh Bhave	Unaad
2023 (8th)	Madhugandha Kulkarni, Paresh Mokashi	Vaalvi
2023 (8th)	Hemant Dhome	Jhimma 2
2023 (8th)	Vitthal Kale	Baaplyok
2023 (8th)	Sudhakar Reddy Yakkanti	Naal 2
2023 (8th)	Vaishali Naik	Baipan Bhari Deva
2024 (9th)	Chhatrapal Ninawe	Ghaath
2024 (9th)	Mahesh Manjrekar	Juna Furniture
2024 (9th)	Vipul Mehta	Ole Aale
2024 (9th)	Alok Sutar, Navjyot Bandiwadekar	Gharat Ganpati
2024 (9th)	Suhas Desale, Mayuresh Wagh	Amaltash
2024 (9th)	Aditi Moghe	Sridevi Prasanna
2025 (10th)	Jayant Digambar Somalkar	Sthal
2025 (10th)	Kshitij Patwardhan	Uttar
2025 (10th)	Dharam Valia	Ata Thambaycha Naay!
2025 (10th)	Rohan Mapuskar	April May 99
2025 (10th)	Rohan Parashuram Kanawade	Sabar Bonda
2025 (10th)	Hrishikesh Deshpande	Jarann
2025 (10th)	Subodh Khanolkar	Dashavtar
2025 (10th)	Santosh Davkhar	Gondhal

== See also ==
- Filmfare Awards Marathi
- Filmfare Awards
- Filmfare Award for Best Film – Marathi
- Filmfare Award for Best Director – Marathi
