= Filmfare Award for Best Supporting Actress – Marathi =

Indian award for Marathi language films

Filmfare Marathi Awards for Best Supporting Actress
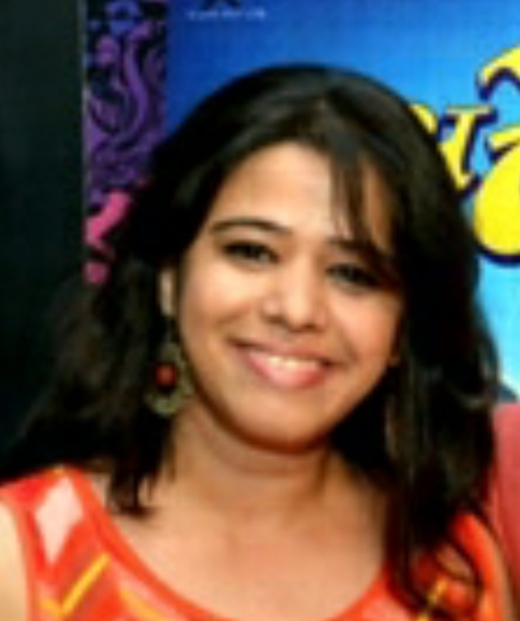
- The 2025 recipient: Anita Date-Kelkar for Jarann
- Awarded for: Best Performance by an Actress in a Supporting Role
- Country: India
- Presented by: Filmfare
- First award: Amruta Subhash, Astu (2014)
- Website: Filmfare Awards

The Filmfare Marathi Award for Best Supporting Actress is an award, which is presented annually at the Filmfare Awards to an actor via a public vote or jury; it is given by Filmfare for Marathi films. Each individual entry shows the title followed by the production company and the producer. The award was first given in 2014.

== Superlatives ==
Superlative	Actor	Record
Actress with most awards	Anita Date-Kelkar	3
Actress with most nominations	Neena Kulkarni	4
Actress with most nominations	Mrinal Kulkarni	4
Actress with most nominations without ever winning	Mrinal Kulkarni	4
Eldest winner	Nirmiti Sawant (2020)	66
Youngest winner	Sai Tamhankar (2016)	30

== Winners and nominees ==
=== 2010s ===
Year	Photos of winners	Actor	Role(s)	Film	Ref.
2014		Amruta Subhash	Channamma	Astu	
2014		Neena Kulkarni	Durgabai	Taptapadi	
2014		Tanvi Azmi	Sumitra Devi	Lai Bhaari	
2014		Smita Tambe	Shabana	Candle March	
2014		Nandita Patkar	Dnyanesh's mother	Elizabeth Ekadashi	
2015		Neena Kulkarni	Nirmaladevi Indori	Bioscope	
2015		Sai Tamhankar	Appu	Classmates	
2015		Amruta Khanvilkar	Zareena	Katyar Kaljat Ghusali	
2015		Prarthana Behere	Avani	Mitwaa	
2015		Anjali Patil	Maami	The Silence	
2015		Smita Tambe	Sugandha	Partu	
2016		Sai Tamhankar	Manju	Family Katta	
2016		Mrunmayee Deshpande	Vidya Belwalkar-Barve	Natsamrat	
2016		Priyanka Bose	Aai	Half Ticket	
2016		Sukanya Kulkarni	Sarika	Ventilator	
2016		Mrinal Kulkarni	Meera	& Jara Hatke	
2016		Chhaya Kadam	Suman Akka	Sairat	
2017		Chinmayee Sumit	Alok's mother	Muramba	
2017		Jyoti Subhash	Satya's Aaji	Chi Va Chi Sau Ka	
2017		Parna Pethe	Aboli	Faster Fene	
2017		Usha Naik	Tulsabai	Lapachhapi	
2017		Kranti Redkar	Radha Bhondve	Karaar	
2017		Kalyani Muley	Manjhi	Ringan	

=== 2020s ===
Year	Photos of winners	Actor	Role(s)	Film	Ref.
2020		Neena Kulkarni	Sunil's mother	Mogra Phulaalaa	
2020		Mrinal Kulkarni	Rajmata Jijabai	Fatteshikast	
2020		Sonalee Kulkarni	Priyanka	Ti & Ti	
2020		Nandita Patkar	Mai	Khari Biscuit	
2020		Savita Prabhune	Varun's mother	Miss U Mister	
2020		Chhaya Kadam	Vashya's mother	Aatpadi Nights	
2021		Sonalee Kulkarni	Monica Ubhe	Dhurala	
2021		Geetanjali Kulkarni	Sadhana Karkhanis	Karkhanisanchi Waari	
2021		Alka Kubal	Jyoti Tai Ubhe	Dhurala	
2021		Kshitee Jog	Anjali Patil	Choricha Mamla	
2021		Nirmiti Sawant	Nirmala Konde-Patil	Jhimma	
2021		Suhas Joshi	Indumati (Indu) Karnik	Jhimma	
2022		Anita Date-Kelkar	Vasantrao's mother	Me Vasantrao	
2022		Amruta Khanvilkar	Manasi	Pondicherry	
2022		Mrinal Kulkarni	Rajmata Jijabai	Sher Shivraj	
2022		Kshitee Jog	Devyani	Sunny	
2022		Neena Kulkarni	Daulatrao Deshmane	Medium Spicy	
2022		Veena Jamkar	Siddhant's mother	Mann Kasturi Re	
2023		Anita Date-Kelkar	Avani	Vaalvi	
2023		Nirmiti Sawant	Nirmala Konde-Patil	Jhimma 2	
2023		Suhas Joshi	Indumati Karnik	Jhimma 2	
2023		Sukanya Kulkarni	Sadhana	Baipan Bhaari Deva	
2023		Shilpa Navalkar	Ketaki Patil	Baipan Bhaari Deva	
2023		Deepti Devi	Parvati	Naal 2	
2024		Namrata Sambherao	Asha	Naach Ga Ghuma	
2024		Ashwini Bhave	Ahilya Sharad Gharat	Gharat Ganpati	
2024		Mrinal Kulkarni	Sayali's mother	Ek Don Teen Chaar	
2024		Nandita Patkar	Kaveri Khot	Panchak	
2024		Nirmiti Sawant	Lamby's mother	Navra Maza Navsacha 2	
2024		Sulbha Arya	Sridevi's grandmother	Sridevi Prasanna	
2025		Anita Date-Kelkar	Ganguti	Jarann	
2025		Priyadarshini Indalkar	Vandana Soman	Dashavatar	
2025		Kiran Khoje	Apsara Jadhav	Ata Thambaycha Naay!	
2025		Prajakta Hanamghar	Jayashree Kamble	Ata Thambaycha Naay!	
2025		Kshitee Jog	Jayashree	Fussclass Dabhade	
2025		Jayshri Jagtap	Suman	Sabar Bonda	
