= Aatmapamphlet =

- Theatrical release poster
- Directed by: Ashish Avinash Bende
- Screenplay by: Paresh Mokashi
- Produced by: Bhushan Kumar; Krishan Kumar; Aanand L. Rai; Kanupriya A. Iyer; Madhugandha Kulkarni; Shariq Patel
- Starring: Om Bendkhale; Pranjalii Shrikant; Chetan Wagh; Manas Tondwalkar; Khushi Hajare; Bhimrao Mude; Ketaki Saraf
- Cinematography: Satyajeet Shobha Shriram
- Edited by: Faisal Mahadik
- Music by: Saket Kanetkar
- Production companies: T-Series; Colour Yellow Productions; Zee Studios
- Release dates: 22 February 2023 (Berlin); 6 October 2023 (India)
- Running time: 90 minutes
- Country: India
- Language: Marathi

Aatmapamphlet (transl. Autobio-Pamphlet) is an Indian Marathi-language coming of age film directed by Ashish Avinash Bende in his debut. Screenplay is by Paresh Mokashi and cinematography is by Satyajit Shobha Sriram. The film is jointly produced by T-Series, Colour Yellow Productions and Zee Studios.

Atmapamplet was screened at the 73rd Berlin International Film Festival, where nominated to compete for the Generation 14plus Award. The film was theatrically released on 6 October 2023.

Ashish Bende received the Best Debut Film Director award at the 71st National Film Awards.

== Plot ==
Aatmapamphlet, a satirical biographical film, unveils 10-year-old Ashish in India of 1990s. His accidental hand-hold with Srushti sparks innocent love. Amidst socio-political shifts, the story navigates personal, familial, and societal transformations. Join Ashish's introspective quest for life's purpose, humorously presented through a child's eyes. A roller-coaster of soul-searching in a nostalgic tale.

== Cast ==
- Om Bendkhale as Ashish
  - Manas Tondwalkar as young Ashish
- Roomani Khare as Srishti
  - Pranjalii Shrikant as younger Srishti
  - Khushi Hajare as youngest Srishti
- Chetan Wagh as Borya
- Bhimrao Mude as Baba
- Ketaki Saraf as Aai
- Deepak Shirke as Aajoba

== Production ==
=== Development ===
The film originated from the personal anecdotes shared by Ashish Avinash Bende, reflecting his experiences as a Dalit boy in Pune. Encouraged by Paresh Mokashi and Madhugandha Kulkarni, Bende translated these stories into a script, spurred by an ultimatum from Kulkarni.

Bende drew inspiration from his own circle of friends, ensuring a genuine representation of the characters' dynamics.

=== Filming ===
Principal-photography was begun in March 2021. Shooting of the film amidst the COVID-19 pandemic posed logistical challenges. Using live streaming technology, Bende remotely supervised the shoot, maintaining real-time communication with the crew. The half of shooting was completed before second lockdown. The film was shot over 36 days around 37 locations.

== Reception ==
In the "Generation 14plus" section, the film was competed for the Crystal Bear and the film prize AG KINO GILDE 14plus.

== Accolades ==
Year	Award	Category	Nominee(s)	Result	Ref.
2023	Asia Pacific Young Audience Award	Young Audience Award	T-Series, Colour Yellow Productions & Zee Studios	Won	
2023	Berlin International Film Festival	Generation 14plus – Best Film	Ashish Avinash Bende	Nominated	
2023	Indian Film Festival of Melbourne	Best Indie Film	T-Series, Colour Yellow Productions & Zee Studios	Nominated	
2023	Indian Film Festival of Melbourne	Best Director	Ashish Avinash Bende	Nominated	
2024	Filmfare Awards Marathi	Best Film	T-Series, Colour Yellow Productions & Zee Studios	Won	
2024	Filmfare Awards Marathi	Best Director	Ashish Avinash Bende	Won	
2024	Filmfare Awards Marathi	Best Story	Ashish Avinash Bende	Won	
2024	Filmfare Awards Marathi	Best Critics Movie	Ashish Avinash Bende	Nominated	
2024	Filmfare Awards Marathi	Best Dialogue	Paresh Mokashi	Won	
2024	Filmfare Awards Marathi	Best Screenplay	Paresh Mokashi	Nominated	
2024	Filmfare Awards Marathi	Best Editing	Faisal Mahadik	Won	
2024	Filmfare Awards Marathi	Best Cinematography	Satyajeet Shobha Shreeram	Nominated	
2024	Filmfare Awards Marathi	Best Art Direction	Baban Adagale	Nominated	
2024	Filmfare Awards Marathi	Best Background Score	Saket Kanetkar	Nominated	
2024	Filmfare Awards Marathi	Best Costume Design	Sachin Lovalekar	Nominated	
