= Dashavatar (2025 film) =

2025 Marathi film by Subodh Khanolkar

- Theatrical release poster
- Directed by: Subodh Khanolkar
- Written by: Subodh Khanolkar
- Produced by: Sujay Hande; Onkar Kate; Subodh Khanolkar; Ashok Hande; Aditya Joshi; Nitin Sahasrabudhe; Mrunal Sahasrabudhe; Sanjay Dubey; Vinayak Joshi
- Starring: Dilip Prabhavalkar; Bharat Jadhav; Sidharth Menon; Abhinay Berde; Priyadarshini Indalkar; Mahesh Manjrekar
- Cinematography: Devendra Golatkar
- Edited by: Faizal Mahadik
- Music by: AV Prafullachandra
- Production companies: Ocean Film Company; Ocean Art House
- Distributed by: Zee Studios
- Release date: 12 September 2025
- Running time: 155 minutes
- Country: India
- Language: Marathi
- Budget: ₹5–12.50 crore
- Box office: ₹29 crore

Dashavatar is a 2025 Indian Marathi-language suspense thriller film directed by Subodh Khanolkar and produced by Ocean Film Company, and Ocean Art House. The film features Dilip Prabhavalkar, Bharat Jadhav, Mahesh Manjrekar, Siddharth Menon, Abhinay Berde, and Priyadarshini Indalkar in the leading roles. The film follows an ageing Dashavatāra performer whose final play turns into a spiritual and cultural battle, blending myth with reality to explore sacrifice, faith, and the struggle to protect heritage and nature.

The film was theatrically released on 12 September 2025. The film received positive response from critics, grossed over ₹29 crore at the box office and emerged as the highest grossing Marathi film of 2025. It was the first Marathi film to be released in a Malayalam version, and it was released on 12 December 2025 in Kerala.

== Plot ==
In the Konkan region of Maharashtra, veteran Dashavtari performer Babuli Mestri (Dilip Prabhavalkar) has dedicated his entire life to preserving the traditional theatre form of Dashavatār. Despite advancing age and failing eyesight, he stubbornly continues to perform, earning both ridicule and affection from the villagers, who call him "half mad". His son Madhav (Siddharth Menon) worries about his health and urges him to retire, but Babuli promises to step away once Madhav secures stable employment.

When Madhav finally gets a job, Babuli agrees to deliver one last performance during the Mahashivratri festival, while Madhav plans to propose to his girlfriend Vandana (Priyadarshini Indalkar) on the same day. However, the night takes an unexpected turn when Babuli, in the middle of the play, appears to embody the fierce Rudra avatar. This blurs the line between performance and reality, leading him into a struggle that reflects both personal sacrifice and the community's battle to protect their natural and cultural heritage.

Structured like a traditional Dashavatār play, the narrative begins with a purva-ranga that introduces the cultural and familial context, and builds into an uttar-ranga where myth and present-day conflicts intertwine. Themes of love, faith, sacrifice, revenge and environmental consciousness are woven into Babuli's journey, emphasising the continued relevance of the Dashavatār tradition as both a spiritual metaphor and a form of resistance in contemporary society.

== Cast ==
- Dilip Prabhavalkar as Babuli Mestri
- Mahesh Manjrekar as Inspector Michael D'Costa
- Siddharth Menon as Madhav Mestri
- Abhinay Berde as Monty Sarmalkar
- Priyadarshini Indalkar as Vandana Soman
- Sunil Tawde as Policeman Parab
- Ravi Kale as Aaba Tandel
- Lokesh Mittal as Mansukhani
- Bharat Jadhav as Laxman Wadekar (Special appearance)
- Aarti Wadagbalkar as Constable Ujjwala Sawant
- Vijay Kenkre as Cabinet Minister Ashok Sarmalkar
- Guru Thakur as Doctor
- Padmakar Oze as Naik Master
- Satish Joshi as Soman Guruji
- Shweta Kudalkar as Vandana's mother
- Vaibhavi Pardeshi as Aaba Tandel's wife
- Akshay Chinchurkar as Young Babuli
- Avaan Prafullachandra as Young Madhav
- Dada Rane Konaskar as Bhajia vendor

== Production ==
Early reports suggested that the lead role in Dashavatar had initially been offered to Rajinikanth, but director Subodh Khanolkar later clarified that these were only rumours. According to him, the role of veteran Dashavatar performer Babuli Mestri was conceived specifically for Dilip Prabhavalkar, and had he declined, the project would have been shelved. Khanolkar added that "for me, Dilip Prabhavalkar is no less than Rajinikanth in Marathi cinema."

The film was shot across multiple locations in the Konkan region, including Kudal, and was completed in 50 days. Khanolkar stated that his vision was to preserve the folk-theatrical essence of Dashavatari plays while making it accessible to modern audiences. To achieve this, the production employed extensive VFX and integrated the traditional performance style with contemporary cinematic techniques.

== Music ==
The music is composed by AV Prafullachandra and lyrics are penned by Guru Thakur.

Track listing
No.	Title	Singer(s)	Length
1.	"Aavshicho Gho"	Onkarswaroop	6:52
2.	"Rutuchakra"	Sahil Kulkarni, Swanandi Sardesai	5:53
3.	"Rangpooja"	Ajay Gogavale	4:07
4.	"Jai Hanuman"	Nakash Aziz	4:55
5.	"Varaha Avatar Stotra"	-	1:08
6.	"Matsya Avatar Stotra"	-	2:26
7.	"Narsinh Avatar Stotra"	-	0:35
8.	"Dashavatar Theme"	-	1:15
9.	"Rangpooja - End Saga"	Ajay Gogavale	4:16
10.	"Paramparik Ganesh Stavan"	Amol Mochemadkar	4:06
Total length:			35:33

== Marketing ==
The trailer was released on 18 August 2025.

== Release ==
=== Theatrical ===
The film was theatrically released on 12 September 2025. The premiere event was attended by several notable personalities including Aaditya Thackeray, which gained media attention. The film was released in twenty cities across the United States and in Australia, making it the first Marathi film to have a theatrical release in Australia.

Dashavatar was earlier scheduled to release in Malayalam on 21 November 2025, but it was released on 12 December 2025.

=== Home media ===
The film was digitally released on 14 November 2025 on ZEE5.

== Reception ==
=== Critical reception ===
Dashavatar received mixed-to-positive reviews from critics. Critics praised the film's cultural authenticity, performances and visuals, while pointing to pacing issues and a less impactful second half.

Kalpeshraj Kubal of Maharashtra Times rated the film 4 out of 5 stars, praising its breathtaking cinematography of Konkan's landscapes and the blend of traditional and modern music. Mihir Bhanage of The Times of India rated the film 3 out of 5, describing it as a "visual spectacle" that effectively captures Konkan's scenic beauty, theatre traditions and spiritual beliefs.

Lokmat offered a more mixed take, acknowledging the film's effective use of local dialect, costumes, music and traditions while pointing out its occasional melodramatic tone and uneven pacing. A review in Sakal commended Subodh Khanolkar's direction for blending Dashavtari folk theatre with contemporary concerns. He described first half as "gripping and engaging," and noted that the second half lost some narrative grip, leading to slight disappointment. Reshma Raikwar of Loksatta wrote "The film's pace changes drastically between the two halves, shifting from a realistic narrative to a more fantasy-driven one."

Amol Karhadkar of The Hindu noted that Dashavatar shows how a story grounded in local culture can speak to universal human emotions. Anupama Gunde of Pudhari highlighted the film's environmental messaging, noting how it connects Konkan's threatened ecology with the personal struggles of its protagonist.

=== Box office ===
On its opening day, the film collected ₹65 lakh. Over the first three days, it grossed more than ₹5.22 crore, marking the biggest opening weekend for a Marathi film in 2025. The film grossed ₹9.25–12 crore in its opening week. It collected ₹15.85 crore by the second weekend.

It collected ₹21.3 crore in its second week, and by the end of the fourth week, its worldwide gross reached ₹26.43 crore. The film earned ₹27.94 crore in thirty nine days.

=== Accolades ===
Awards	Year	Category	Recipient	Result	Ref
Lokshahi Marathi Chitra Sanman	2025	Popular Film	Dashavatar	Pending	
Lokshahi Marathi Chitra Sanman	2025	Best Actor	Dilip Prabhavalkar	Pending	
Zee Chitra Gaurav Puraskar	2026	Blockbuster of the Year	Dashavatar	Won	
Zee Chitra Gaurav Puraskar	2026	Zee5 Most Watched Film	Dashavatar	Won	
Zee Chitra Gaurav Puraskar	2026	Best Actor	Dilip Prabhavalkar	Won	
Zee Chitra Gaurav Puraskar	2026	Best Supporting Actor	Siddharth Menon	Nominated	
Zee Chitra Gaurav Puraskar	2026	Best Music Director	AV Prafullachandra	Nominated	
Zee Chitra Gaurav Puraskar	2026	Best Background Score	AV Prafullachandra	Nominated	
Zee Chitra Gaurav Puraskar	2026	Best Playback Singer Male	Ajay Gogavale (Rangpooja)	Won	
Zee Chitra Gaurav Puraskar	2026	Best Lyricist	Guru Thakur (Rangpooja)	Nominated	
Zee Chitra Gaurav Puraskar	2026	Best Choreographer	Sonia Parchure	Nominated	
Zee Chitra Gaurav Puraskar	2026	Best Story	Subodh Khanolkar	Nominated	
Zee Chitra Gaurav Puraskar	2026	Best Cinematography	Devendra Golatkar	Nominated	
Zee Chitra Gaurav Puraskar	2026	Best Production Design	Sanjeev Rane	Nominated	
Zee Chitra Gaurav Puraskar	2026	Best Makeup	Rohit Mahadik	Won	
Zee Chitra Gaurav Puraskar	2026	Best Custom	Sachin Lovalekar	Won	
Zee Chitra Gaurav Puraskar	2026	Best Sound Recordist	Shishir Chousalkar, Akshay Vaidya	Nominated	
Maharashtra Times Sanman	2026	Best Popular Film	Dashavatar	Won	
Maharashtra Times Sanman	2026	Remarkable Achievement	Dilip Prabhavalkar	Won	
Maharashtra Times Sanman	2026	Best Supporting Actor	Siddharth Menon	Nominated	
Maharashtra Times Sanman	2026	Best Lyricist	Guru Thakur (Rangpooja)	Won	
Maharashtra Times Sanman	2026	Best Music Director	AV Prafullachandra	Nominated	
Maharashtra Times Sanman	2026	Best Playback Singer Male	Ajay Gogavale (Rangpooja)	Won	
Maharashtra Times Sanman	2026	Best Playback Singer Female	Swanandi Sardesai (Rutuchakra)	Nominated	
Maharashtra Times Sanman	2026	Best Art Director	Sanjeev Rane	Nominated	
Indian National Cine Academy	2026	Best Film	Dashavatar	Nominated	
Indian National Cine Academy	2026	Best Debut Producer	Sujay Hande	Nominated	
Indian National Cine Academy	2026	Best Director	Subodh Khanolkar	Won	
Indian National Cine Academy	2026	Best Actor	Dilip Prabhavalkar	Won	
Indian National Cine Academy	2026	Best Actress	Priyadarshini Indalkar	Nominated	
Indian National Cine Academy	2026	Best Cinematographer	Devendra Golatkar	Nominated	
City Cine Awards Marathi	2026	Best Film	Dashavatar	Nominated	
City Cine Awards Marathi	2026	Best Director	Subodh Khanolkar	Nominated	
City Cine Awards Marathi	2026	Best Screenplay	Subodh Khanolkar	Won	
City Cine Awards Marathi	2026	Best Actor	Dilip Prabhavalkar	Won	
City Cine Awards Marathi	2026	Best Supporting Actor – Male	Siddharth Menon	Won	
City Cine Awards Marathi	2026	Best Music Director	AV Prafullachandra	Nominated	
City Cine Awards Marathi	2026	Best Singer – Male	Ajay Gogavale (Rangpooja)	Won	
City Cine Awards Marathi	2026	Best Singer – Female	Swanandi Sardesai (Rutuchakra)	Nominated	
City Cine Awards Marathi	2026	Best Lyricist	Guru Thakur (Rangpooja)	Nominated	
Superhit Marathi film festival	2026	Special Award	Subodh Khanolkar	Won	
Filmfare Awards Marathi	2026	Best Film	Dashavatar	Nominated	
Filmfare Awards Marathi	2026	Best Director	Subodh Khanolkar	Nominated	
Filmfare Awards Marathi	2026	Best Director Debut	Subodh Khanolkar	Won	
Filmfare Awards Marathi	2026	Best Story	Subodh Khanolkar	Nominated	
Filmfare Awards Marathi	2026	Best Screenplay	Subodh Khanolkar	Nominated	
Filmfare Awards Marathi	2026	Best Actor	Dilip Prabhavalkar	Won	
Filmfare Awards Marathi	2026	Best Supporting Actor	Siddharth Menon	Nominated	
Filmfare Awards Marathi	2026	Best Supporting Actress	Priyadarshini Indalkar	Nominated	
Filmfare Awards Marathi	2026	Best Music Director	AV Prafullachandra	Nominated	
Filmfare Awards Marathi	2026	Best Background Score	AV Prafullachandra	Nominated	
Filmfare Awards Marathi	2026	Best Lyricist	Guru Thakur (Rangpooja)	Nominated	
Filmfare Awards Marathi	2026	Best Playback Singer – Male	Ajay Gogavale (Rangpooja)	Nominated	
Filmfare Awards Marathi	2026	Best Playback Singer – Male	Sahil Kulkarni (Rutuchakra)	Nominated	
Filmfare Awards Marathi	2026	Best Playback Singer – Female	Swanandi Sardesai (Rutuchakra)	Nominated	
Filmfare Awards Marathi	2026	Best Dialogue	Guru Thakur	Nominated	
Filmfare Awards Marathi	2026	Best Cinematography	Devendra Golatkar	Nominated	
Filmfare Awards Marathi	2026	Best Editing	Faisal Mahadik	Nominated	
Filmfare Awards Marathi	2026	Best Choreography	Pooja Kale (Aavshicho Gho)	Nominated	
Filmfare Awards Marathi	2026	Best Choreography	Pooja Kale (Jai Hanuman)	Nominated	
Filmfare Awards Marathi	2026	Best Production Design	Sanjeev Rane	Won	
Filmfare Awards Marathi	2026	Best Sound Design	Shishir Chousalkar, Akshay Vaidya	Nominated	
Filmfare Awards Marathi	2026	Best Costume Design	Sachin Lovalekar	Won	
Filmfare Awards Marathi	2026	Best Makeup	Rohit Mahadik	Won	

== Impact ==
The Konkan geoglyphs spread across nearly 900 kilometers from Ratnagiri to Goa are often seen as the footprints of early human civilization and are now protected monuments. In Ratnagiri district alone, over 1,500 carvings have been found at about 70 sites. An agreement has been signed between the Maharashtra Tourism Development Corporation (MTDC) and the Nisargayatri organization for their preservation and conservation in the Konkan region.
