= Baipan Bhari Deva =

- Theatrical release poster
- Directed by: Kedar Shinde
- Written by: Vaishali Naik
- Produced by: Madhuri Bhosale; Bela Shinde; Ajit Bhure
- Starring: Rohini Hattangadi; Vandana Gupte; Sukanya Kulkarni; Suchitra Bandekar; Deepa Parab; Shilpa Navalkar
- Cinematography: Vasudeo Rane
- Edited by: Mayur Hardas
- Music by: Sai–Piyush
- Production companies: Jio Studios; EmVeeBee Media
- Distributed by: PVR Pictures
- Release date: 30 June 2023
- Running time: 137 minutes
- Country: India
- Language: Marathi
- Budget: est.₹5 crore
- Box office: est.₹92 crore

Baipan Bhari Deva (transl. Womanhood is Tough) is a 2023 Indian Marathi-language drama film directed by Kedar Shinde and produced by Madhuri Bhosale, EmVeeBee Media. It stars Rohini Hattangadi, Vandana Gupte, Sukanya Kulkarni, Shilpa Navalkar, Suchitra Bandekar, Deepa Parab.

The film was already titled 'Mangalagauri' till the shooting of the film's title song "Baipan Bhari Deva". Co-producer Ajit Bhure suggested Kedar Shinde and Madhuri Bhosale to change the film title to 'Baipan Bhari Deva'.

The film grossed over ₹92 crore in 50 days of theatrical run globally, emerged as a blockbuster, the biggest Marathi weekend opener and it became the second highest-grossing Marathi film of all time and highest grossing Marathi film of 2023. This film also created a new record of highest single-day collection of more than ₹6.10 crores for Marathi film industry. It is the highest grossing female-centric film in Marathi film industry. Being made with the budget of ₹5 crore, the film is a critical as well as commercial success, praised for its writing, story, songs and its direction. The film was released on OTT platform Disney+Hotstar.

== Plot ==
This is a story of six sisters, each dealing with their own set of problems. Jaya, the oldest one, has been feeling really down lately. The next is Charu, whose husband seems to have put all his issues on her plate, making her life quite a challenge. Shashi's upset because her daughter likes her mother-in-law more than her. Pallavi is in a tough spot, refusing to give her husband a divorce. Ketaki likes to show off her wealth, and Sadhana has to deal with a father-in-law who's been a bit of a dream crusher.

The sisters gather to celebrate Mangala Gauri. The sisters come together in a ceremony where women pray for their partners’ well‑being. The reunion is marked by disagreements and past conflicts. During the ceremony a dance competition brings the sisters together for a moment of harmony.

The story highlights the struggles that women face in life and the resilience that women show when confronting those struggles. During the Mangala Gauri ceremony the sisters find a chance to reconnect and enjoy time together. The happiness that the sisters feel while dancing shows that even though the sisters have differences and hardships the bond, between the sisters remains strong.

== Cast ==
- Rohini Hattangadi as Jaya
- Vandana Gupte as Shashi
- Sukanya Kulkarni as Sadhana
- Shilpa Navalkar as Ketaki Patil
- Suchitra Bandekar as Pallavi
- Deepa Parab as Charu Deshmukh
- Suruchi Adarkar as Chinmayee (Chinu), Shashi's daughter
- Riya Sharma as Madhavi, Sadhana's daughter-in-law
- Satish Joshi as Arun Desai, Jaya's Husband
- Ganesh Jadhav as Avadhoot Kakade
- Sakshi Paranjape as Avadhoot Kakade’s wife
- Varad Chavan as Fitness Trainer
- Sharad Ponkshe as Anna, Sadhana's father-in-law
- Piyush Ranade as Ashutosh Deshmukh, Charu's husband
- Swapnil Rajshekhar as Vaibhav Patil, Ketaki's husband
- Tushar Dalvi as Anirudh (Ani), Pallavi's husband
- Ramakant Dayama as Dr. Jayant, councellor
- Julia Mone as young Sadhana
- Soham Bandekar as Soham, Pallavi's son
- Nutan Aasgaonkar as Chinmayee’s mother-in-law
- Akshay Kulkarni as Chinmayee’s husband
- Arun and Arjun as Charu’s twins
- Bela Shinde as the doctor
- Nayana Nerulkar as the doctor

== Production ==
=== Development ===
On 8 March 2023, on the occasion of International Women’s Day, legendary cricketer Sachin Tendulkar took to his social media accounts and shared the poster of the film. The film's teaser was released on 28 April 2023. Following this the title track was released on 6 June 2023 with the team visiting Mahalakshmi Temple in Mumbai. The film's official trailer was launched on 13 June 2023 with the presence of the whole team and veteran actor Ashok Sharaf at Swatantrya Veer Savarkar Auditorium, Dadar, Mumbai.

Jio Studios announced the film on International Women's Day 2022. Madhuri Bhosale of EmVeeBee Media produced the film.

=== Casting ===
The story of the film is about six sisters and is women-centric, Shinde cast actresses Rohini Hattangadi, Vandana Gupte, Sukanya Mone, Suchitra Bandekar, Deepa Choudhary, Shilpa Navalkar in lead roles.

=== Filming ===
Principal photography had started in February 2020 a month before Lockdown in India, but the shooting was stopped due to the COVID-19 pandemic in Maharashtra. According to Kedar Shinde, 80% shooting of the film was completed before the lockdown. Madhuri Bhosale, the film producer confirmed that the shoot resumed in September 2020 under strict Covid protocol. Post-production was completed after the lockdown.

== Soundtrack ==
Baipan Bhaari Deva

Soundtrack album by Sai–Piyush
- Released: 2023
- Genre: Feature film soundtrack
- Length: 16:02
- Language: Marathi
- Label: Zee Music Company

Official audio
- Baipan Bhaari Deva - Full Album on YouTube

All music is composed by Sai–Piyush.

Track listing
No.	Title	Lyrics	Singer(s)	Length
1.	"Baipan Bhari Deva (Title Track)"	Valay Mulgund	Saiprasad Nimbalkar	05:36
2.	"Mangalagauri"	Aditi Dravid & Traditional	Savani Ravindra	06:14
3.	"Pinga"	Traditional	Manasi Hedaoo	02:14
4.	"Mangalagauri (Traditional)"	Aditi Dravid & Traditional	Chorus	03:17
Total length:				16:01

== Release ==
=== Theatrical ===
Initially, the film was set to be released on 28 May 2021, it was pushed to 28 January 2022 and then to 6 January 2023. Finally, Baipan Bhari Deva was released in theatres on 30 June 2023.

The film was re-released on 7 March 2025.

=== Home media ===
The film released digitally on Disney+Hotstar

== Reception ==
=== Critical reception ===
A reviewer from Rediff.com rated four and half stars out of five stars and write: "Nice movie, but, whilst we must learn to respect our past, we must also learn to adopt to changing times!" A reviewer from The Times of India rated three and half stars out of five and wrote "Baipan Bhari Deva is an important film not only because it's relatable for women, but also because it helps men understand womanhood." Kalpeshraj Kubal reviewed for Maharashtra Times gave three and half stars out of five said: "In the movie, the protagonist tried to understand the man's hearing in the woman's mind and her femininity." Reshma Raikwar of Loksatta wrote "The director has not set up this film in any preachy style and yet he makes us laugh while watching the film, some deep moments and some quick eye watering." Nandini Ramnath of Scroll.in finds harmony amidst acrimony, also acknowledging the unique problems faced by women in domestic situations. Vinod Ghatge of ABP Majha awarded three and half rating, acknowledging the technical strengths of the movie, such as the camera work, music, and editing. However, he also note a flaw in the pacing, particularly after the interval, where the movie seems to slow down or drag on.

=== Box office ===
==== India ====
On its opening day, the film grossed ₹1.25 crore with around 340–350 screens. The first weekend nett collection of the film is ₹5.90 crore and ₹6.45 crore gross, becomes the biggest Marathi weekend opener of 2023. It collects ₹9.75 crore in five days, so that the film surpassed all other Marathi films at that time in terms of earnings and made it the highest grossing Marathi film of 2023. In the first week film earned ₹11.50 crore nett and ₹12.50 crore gross in Maharashtra. On the eighth day of release, the film grossed more than the first day and grossed over ₹2 crore, taking the total to ₹15.20 crore. On the ninth day, the film broke the record of Riteish Deshmukh's Ved by making a one-day collection of ₹5.70 crore. It has earned ₹6.60 crore on the second Sunday, setting a new record of highest one-day collection. Film collected ₹26.19 crore in 10 days. On eleventh day, the film grossed over ₹30 crore in Maharashtra, and ₹34.2 crore nationwide. The film grossed over ₹37.35 crore on fourteenth day and next day it stands at ₹39.85 crore. On the seventeenth day, the film crossed the ₹50 crore mark. News18 reported that the film collected ₹62 crore in 18 days. The film grossed over ₹57.15 crore in 20 days. The film crossed ₹58.59 crore nett collection in three weeks at the box office. On 24th day the film break the record of previous year release Ved lifetime nett box office collection, collected over ₹65 crore. On 30th day, film collected ₹70.20 crore in India. The fourth week collection is ₹10 crore. It collected ₹73.91 crore in 37 days, and ₹76.05 crore net 50 days in India.

==== USA ====
The film collected ₹82 lakh (US$85,000) in USA.

==== Worldwide ====
The film collected ₹12 crores in the first week, ₹24 crores in the second week. The film again collected ₹21 crore in the third week and ₹10 crore in the fourth week. The film collected ₹89.6 crore in 45 days worldwide. As of 13 August 2023 the film grossed over ₹92 crore globally, becoming the second Marathi highest grosser of all time.

== Accolades ==
Award	Year	Category	Recipient(s)	Result	Ref.
TV9 Aapla Bioscope Awards	2023	Best Actress in a Supporting Role	Sukanya Kulkarni	Won	
TV9 Aapla Bioscope Awards	2023	Best Song	Mangalagauri	Nominated	
Maharashtracha Favourite Kon?	2024	Favourite Film	Baipan Bhari Deva	Nominated	
Maharashtracha Favourite Kon?	2024	Favourite Director	Kedar Shinde	Nominated	
Maharashtracha Favourite Kon?	2024	Favourite Actress	Rohini Hattangadi, Vandana Gupte, Sukanya Kulkarni, Shilpa Navalkar, Suchitra Bandekar, Deepa Parab	Nominated	
Maharashtracha Favourite Kon?	2024	Special Award for Actress and Film	Rohini Hattangadi, Vandana Gupte, Sukanya Kulkarni, Shilpa Navalkar, Suchitra Bandekar, Deepa Parab	Won	
Maharashtracha Favourite Kon?	2024	Favourite Song	Mangalagauri	Nominated	
Maharashtracha Favourite Kon?	2024	Favourite Song	Baipan Bhari Deva (Title Track)	Nominated	
Maharashtracha Favourite Kon?	2024	Favourite Female Playback Singer	Savani Ravindra – "Mangalagauri"	Nominated	
City Cine Awards	2024	Best Film	Baipan Bhari Deva	Won	
City Cine Awards	2024	Best Director	Kedar Shinde	Won	
City Cine Awards	2024	Best Actor – Female	Vandana Gupte	Nominated	
City Cine Awards	2024	Best Music Director	Sai-Piyush	Nominated	
City Cine Awards	2024	Best Lyricist	Valay Mulgund – "Baipan Bhari Deva (Title Track)"	Won	
City Cine Awards	2024	Best Singer – Female	Savani Ravindra – "Mangalagauri"	Nominated	
City Cine Awards	2024	Best Screenplay	Vaishali Naik	Nominated	
City Cine Awards	2024	The Game Changer	Sukanya Kulkarni	Nominated	
MaTa Sanman	2024	Best Film	Baipan Bhari Deva	Nominated	
MaTa Sanman	2024	Best Director	Kedar Shinde	Won	
MaTa Sanman	2024	Best Dialogue	Vaishali Naik	Nominated	
MaTa Sanman	2024	Best Lyricist	Valay Mulgund – "Baipan Bhari Deva (Title Track)"	Nominated	
MaTa Sanman	2024	Best Music Director	Sai-Piyush	Nominated	
MaTa Sanman	2024	Special Recognition Award Actress and Film	Rohini Hattangadi, Vandana Gupte, Sukanya Kulkarni, Shilpa Navalkar, Suchitra Bandekar, Deepa Parab	Won	
Zee Chitra Gaurav Puraskar	2024	Best Film	Baipan Bhari Deva	Nominated	
Zee Chitra Gaurav Puraskar	2024	Best Popular Film	Baipan Bhari Deva	Won	
Zee Chitra Gaurav Puraskar	2024	Best Actress	Rohini Hattangadi, Vandana Gupte, Sukanya Kulkarni, Shilpa Navalkar, Suchitra Bandekar, Deepa Parab	Won	
Zee Chitra Gaurav Puraskar	2024	Best Music Director	Sai-Piyush	Nominated	
Zee Chitra Gaurav Puraskar	2024	Best Female Singer	Savani Ravindra – "Mangalagauri"	Nominated	
Zee Chitra Gaurav Puraskar	2024	Best Lyricist	Valay Mulgund – "Baipan Bhari Deva (Title Track)"	Nominated	
Zee Chitra Gaurav Puraskar	2024	Best Story	Vaishali Naik	Nominated	
Zee Chitra Gaurav Puraskar	2024	Best Dialogue	Vaishali Naik	Nominated	
Zee Chitra Gaurav Puraskar	2024	Best Choreography	Subhash Nakashe	Nominated	
Filmfare Awards Marathi	2024	Best Film	Baipan Bhari Deva	Won	
Filmfare Awards Marathi	2024	Best Director	Kedar Shinde	Nominated	
Filmfare Awards Marathi	2024	Best Actress Critics	Rohini Hattangadi	Won	
Filmfare Awards Marathi	2024	Best Actress	Rohini Hattangadi	Nominated	
Filmfare Awards Marathi	2024	Best Actress	Vandana Gupte	Nominated	
Filmfare Awards Marathi	2024	Best Supporting Actress	Shilpa Navalkar	Nominated	
Filmfare Awards Marathi	2024	Best Supporting Actress	Sukanya Kulkarni	Nominated	
Filmfare Awards Marathi	2024	Best Music Director	Sai-Piyush	Nominated	
Filmfare Awards Marathi	2024	Best Lyricist	Aditi Dravid – "Mangalagauri"	Nominated	
Filmfare Awards Marathi	2024	Best Lyricist	Valay Mulgund – "Baipan Bhari Deva (Title Track)"	Nominated	
Filmfare Awards Marathi	2024	Best Playback Singer – Female	Savani Ravindra – "Mangalagauri"	Nominated	
Filmfare Awards Marathi	2024	Best Story	Vaishali Naik	Nominated	
Filmfare Awards Marathi	2024	Best Screenplay	Vaishali Naik	Nominated	
Filmfare Awards Marathi	2024	Best Dialogue	Vaishali Naik	Nominated	
Filmfare Awards Marathi	2024	Best Production Design	Mahesh Kudalkar	Nominated	
Filmfare Awards Marathi	2024	Best Sound Design	Atul Deshpande	Nominated	
International Iconic Awards Marathi	2024	Best Film	Baipan Bhari Deva	Won	
International Iconic Awards Marathi	2024	Best Supporting Actress (Female)	Sukanya Kulkarni	Won	
Maharashtra State Film Awards	2024	Best Film	Baipan Bhari Deva	Nominated	
Maharashtra State Film Awards	2024	Best Director	Kedar Shinde	Nominated	
Maharashtra State Film Awards	2024	Best Comedian Female	Sukanya Kulkarni	Nominated	
Maharashtra State Film Awards	2024	Best Playback Singer Female	Suvarna Rathod – "Ugdya Punha Jivah"	Nominated	
Maharashtra State Film Awards	2024	Best Lyricist	Valay Mulgund – "Baipan Bhari Deva (Title Track)"	Nominated	
Maharashtra State Film Awards	2024	Best Choreographer	Subhash Nakashe – "Mangalagauri"	Nominated	
Maharashtra State Film Awards	2024	Best Screenplay	Vaishali Naik	Nominated	
Maharashtra State Film Awards	2024	Best Sound Mixing	Atul Deshpande	Won	

== Remakes ==
In February 2025, Boney Kapoor acquired the South remake rights of Baipan Bhari Deva for nearly ₹2 crore.

A Punjabi-language language remake Badaa Karara Pudna was released on 7 November 2025.
