= Filmfare Award for Best Art Direction – Marathi =

Indian award for Marathi language films

Filmfare Marathi Awards for Best Art Direction
- Awarded for: Best Performance by a Art Director
- Country: India
- Presented by: Filmfare
- First award: Nitin Chandrakant Desai, Rama Madhav (2014)
- Currently held by: Sanjeev Rane, Dashavatar (2025)
- Website: Filmfare Awards

The Filmfare Marathi Award for Best Art Direction is given by Filmfare, an Indian magazine, as part of its annual Filmfare Awards for Marathi films.

== Winner and nominees ==
=== 2010s ===
Year	Recipient(s)	Film
2014	Nitin Chandrakant Desai	Rama Madhav
2014	Santosh Phutane	Candle March
2014	Sachin Bhilare	Elizabeth Ekadashi
2014	Mahesh Gurunath	Vitti Dandu
2014	Devdas Bhandare	Taptapadi
2015	Santosh Phutane	Katyar Kaljat Ghusli
2016	Vasu Patil	Half Ticket
2016	Abhishek Redkar	Vazandar
2016	Eknath Kadam	Natsamrat
2016	Nikhil Kovale	Ventilator
2016	Siddharth Tatooskar	& Jara Hatke
2016	Siddharth Tatooskar	YZ
2017	Nikhil Kovale	Faster Fene
2017	Santosh Phutane	Kachcha Limboo
2017	Asit Kumar Chhatui, Kuldep Sharma	Hrudayantar
2017	Siddharth Tatooskar	Muramba

=== 2020s ===
Year	Recipient(s)	Film
2020	Sunil Nigvekar, Nilesh Wagh	Anandi Gopal
2020	Ashok Lokare	Girlfriend
2020	Devdas Bhandare	Once More
2020	Sandeep Inamke	Aatpadi Nights
2020	Narendra Haldankar	Bandishala
2020	Satish Chipkar	Khari Biscuit
2021	Pooja Talreja, Ravin D Karde	The Disciple
2021	Atul Lokhande	Mhorkya
2021	Nilesh Wagh	Dhurala
2021	Machhindra Shinde	Bali
2021	Sagar Gaikwad	Karkhanisanchi Waari
2021	Abhishek Redkar	Bonus
2022 (7th)	Ashok Lokare, A. Rucha	Me Vasantrao
2022 (7th)	Ashish Mehta	Medium Spicy
2022 (7th)	Divya Goswami	Pondicherry
2022 (7th)	Prashant Rane	Pangharun
2022 (7th)	Madan Mane	Sarsenapati Hambirrao
2022 (7th)	Pratik Redij	Sher Shivraj
2023 (8th)	Ameya Bhalerao	Shyamchi Aai
2023 (8th)	Baban Adagale	Aatmapamphlet
2023 (8th)	Eknath Kadam	Maharashtra Shahir
2023 (8th)	Mahesh Kudalkar	Baipan Bhari Deva
2023 (8th)	Mahesh Kudalkar	Unaad
2023 (8th)	Pratik Redij	Subhedar
2024 (9th)	Eknath Kadam	Phullwanti
2024 (9th)	Mangesh Bhayde, Rushi Tambe	Amaltash
2024 (9th)	Vipul Mehta	Ole Aale
2024 (9th)	Dr. Sumeet Patil	Gharat Ganpati
2024 (9th)	Prashant Bidkar	Paani
2024 (9th)	Sampada Gejji	Ek Don Teen Chaar
2024 (9th)	Vijay Mahamulkar	Dharmarakshak Mahaveer Chhatrapati Sambhaji Maharaj
2025 (10th)	Sanjeev Rane	Dashavatar
2025 (10th)	Amit Waghchaure	Aarpar
2025 (10th)	Mahesh Kore	Jarann
2025 (10th)	Nikhil Kowale, Apoorva Bhagat	April May 99
2025 (10th)	Sandeep Meher	Gondhal
2025 (10th)	Vikram Singh	Sthal

== See also ==
- Filmfare Awards Marathi
- Filmfare Awards
- Filmfare Award for Best Background Score – Marathi
- Filmfare Award for Best Cinematographer – Marathi
