= Filmfare Marathi Lifetime Achievement Award =

Indian Marathi films awards

Filmfare Marathi Awards for Lifetime Achievement
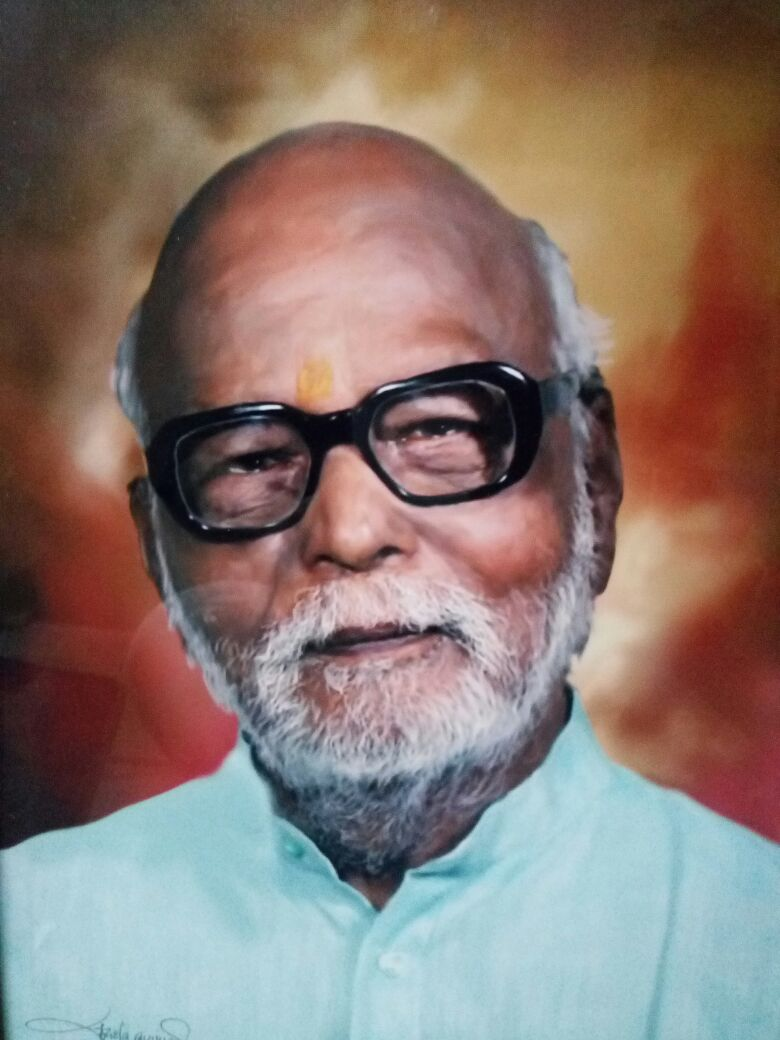
- The 2025 recipient: Rajdutt
- Awarded for: Commemorating an artist's career
- Country: India
- Presented by: Filmfare
- First award: Ramesh Deo (2014)
- Currently held by: Rajdutt (2025)
- Website: Filmfare winners

The Filmfare Marathi Lifetime Achievement Award is given by the Filmfare magazine as part of its annual Filmfare Awards for Marathi films.

== List of honourees ==
Year	Image	Honourees	Nature of work	Age when awarded (in years)
2014		Ramesh Deo	Actor	85
2015		Asha Kale	Actress	67
2016		Ashok Saraf	Actor	69
2017		Hridaynath Mangeshkar	Music Director	80
2018	No ceremony			
2019	No ceremony			
2020	No award			
2021		Sulochana Latkar	Actress	93
2022		Jabbar Patel	Director	80
2023	–	Suhas Joshi	Actress	76
2024		Usha Mangeshkar	Playback Singer	89
2025		Rajdutt	Director	93

== Superlatives ==
- Number of Male recipients – 5
- Number of Female recipients – 4

== See also ==
- Filmfare Awards
- Marathi Cinema
- Filmfare Award Marathi
