= Filmfare Awards Marathi =

Indian films awards

- Awarded for: Excellence in Marathi cinema
- Country: India, Maharashtra
- Presented by: Filmfare
- First award: 1963; Re-started 2014
- Website: www.filmfare.com

Television/radio coverage
- Network: Colors Marathi; Zee Marathi

The Filmfare Awards Marathi are presented annually to both artistic and technical excellence of professionals in the Marathi film industry of India. The ceremony had been sponsored by various private organisations in the past as well as in present provisions. During several years in 1990s, a live ceremony was broadcast to television audiences but was later discontinued for unknown reasons. In 1963 the awards were extended to Marathi, Tamil, Telugu and Bengali languages. The presentation of the awards has been inconsistent throughout its inception. Presently, a recorded and edited version of the awards ceremony is televised.

== History ==
The awards were first given in 1963 and the ceremony used to be held along with Bollywood Filmfare Awards. In 1953, initially recognizing the Hindi film industry. In 1963, awards extended to Best Picture in Marathi, Telugu, Tamil and Bengali, for the awards. In 1974, the awards were extended to Best Actor, Best Actress and Best Director categories.

Mazha Hoshil Ka was the first movie to win the award for Best Film.

== Statuette ==
The statuette, depicting a dancing woman whose arms are raised with her hands touching, is commonly referred to as "Black Lady" (or "The Lady in Black"). Originally designed by N.G. Pansare under the supervision of The Times of India's art director Walter Langhammer, it is generally made of bronze, its height is 46.5 cm and it weighs around five kg.

== The Red Carpet ==
The Red Carpet is a segment that takes place before the beginning of the actual ceremony. This is where actors, actresses, producers, directors, singers, composers, and others that have contributed to Indian cinema are introduced. Hosts question the celebrities about upcoming performances and who they think deserves to take the Black Lady home.

== Records ==
Most awards won by a single film

Film	Year	Awards
Sairat	2016	11
Anandi Gopal	2019	10
Katyar Kaljat Ghusali	2015	8
Ata Thambaycha Naay!	2025	8
Dhurala	2021	7
Me Vasantrao	2022	7
Phullwanti	2024	7
Muramba	2017	6
The Disciple	2021	6
Paani	2024	6
Gondhal	2025	6

Most nominations received by a single film

Film	Year	Nominations
Sairat	2016	22
Dashavatar	2025	22
Ata Thambaycha Naay!	2025	19
Gondhal	2025	19
Anandi Gopal	2019	18
Paani	2024	17
April May 99	2025	17
Ventilator	2016	16
Dhurala	2021	16
Panghrun	2022	16
Baipan Bhaari Deva	2023	16
Unaad	2023	16
Phullwanti	2024	16
Sthal - A Match	2025	16
Muramba	2017	15
Girlfriend	2019	15
Me Vasantrao	2022	15

Most awards won by a male

Recipient(s)	Total awards won	Categories
Ajay Gogavale	8	Best Music Director (4); Best Male Playback Singer (3); Best Background Score (1)
Jabbar Patel	5	Best Director (4); Lifetime Achievement Award (1)
Paresh Mokashi	5	Best Film Critics (1); Best Screenplay (2); Best Dialogue (2)
Ashok Saraf	4	Best Actor (3); Lifetime Achievement Award (1)
Jitendra Joshi	4	Best Film (1); Best Actor Critics (2); Best Supporting Actor (1)

Most awards won by a female

Recipient(s)	Total awards won	Categories
Sonali Kulkarni	4	Best Actress (3); Best Actress Critics (1)
Neena Kulkarni	3	Best Actress Critics (1); Best Supporting Actress (2)
Sai Tamhankar	3	Best Actress (1); Best Actress Critics (1); Best Supporting Actress (1)
Anita Date-Kelkar	3	Best Supporting Actress (3)

== Award categories ==
As of 2017, there are a total of 26 awards given in different categories. There is a separate category of critics awards, decided by noted film-critics rather than popular votes. Awards are given in the following categories. Follow the links for lists of the award winners and nominations, year by year.

=== Merit awards ===
- Best Film
- Best Director
- Best Actor
- Best Actress
- Best Supporting Actor
- Best Supporting Actress
- Best Male Debut
- Best Female Debut
- Best Music Director
- Best Lyricist
- Best Male Playback Singer
- Best Female Playback Singer

=== Critics' awards ===
- Critics Award Best Film
- Critics Award Best Actor
- Critics Award Best Actress

=== Technical awards ===
- Best Story
- Best Screenplay
- Best Dialogue
- Best Art Direction
- Best Background Score
- Best Cinematography
- Best Editing
- Best Choreography
- Best Sound Design
- Best Costume Design

=== Special awards ===
- Lifetime Achievement
- Best Debut Director
- Best Child Actor
- Excellence in Marathi Cinema

== Previous winners ==
Marathi Cinema

1963
Best Film	Mazha Hoshil Ka		
1964
Best Film	Sant Nivrutti Dnyandev		
1965
Best Film	Laxmi Aali Ghara		
1966
Best Film	Gurukilli		
1967
Best Film	Pavna Kathcha Dhondi		
1968
Best Film	Ekti		
1969
Best Film	Jiwhala		
1970
Best Film	Apradh		
1971
Best Film	Shantata! Court Chalu Aahe		
1972
Best Film	Kunku Mazhe Bhagyache		
1973
Best Film	Andhala Marto Dola		
1974
Best Film	Sugandhi Katta	Best Director	
Best Actor	Shriram Lagoo – Sugandhi Katta	Best Actress	Sarala Yeolekar – Sugandhi Katta
1975
Best Film	Samna	Best Director	Jabbar Patel – Samna
Best Actor	Shriram Lagoo – Samna	Best Actress	Sandhya – Chandnachi Choli Ang Ang Jali
1976
Best Film	Aaram Haram Aahe	Best Director	Vasant Joglekar – Ha Khel Sawalyancha
Best Actor	Ravindra Mahajani – Zunj	Best Actress	Asha Kale – Ha Khel Sawalyancha
1977
Best Film	Naav Motha Lakshan Khota	Best Director	Muralidhar Kapdi – Naav Motha Lakshan Khota
Best Actor	Shriram Lagoo – Bhingri	Best Actress	Usha Chavan – Naav Motha Lakshan Khota
Special Award	Ashok Saraf – Ram Ram Gangaram		
1978
Best Film	Devaki Nandan Gopala	Best Director	Jabbar Patel – Jait Re Jait
Best Actor	Yashwant Dutt – Bhairu Pailwan Ki Jai	Best Actress	Smita Patil – Jait Re Jait
1979
Best Film	Sinhasan	Best Director	Jabbar Patel – Sinhasan
Best Actor	Sachin Pilgaonkar – Ashtavinayak	Best Actress	Ranjana – Sushila
1980
Best Film	22 June 1897	Best Director	Nachiket Patwardhan – 22 June 1897
Best Actor	Nilu Phule – Sahkar Samrat	Best Actress	Usha Chavan – Ran Pakhare
1981
Best Film	Umbartha	Best Director	Jabbar Patel – Umbartha
Best Actor	Amol Palekar – Akriet	Best Actress	Smita Patil – Umbartha
1982
Best Film	Shapit	Best Director	Rajdutt, Arvind Deshpande – Shapit
Best Actor	Yashwant Dutt – Shapit	Best Actress	Madhu Kambikar – Shapit
1983
Best Film	Gupchup Gupchup	Best Director	V. K. Naik – Gupchup Gupchup
Best Actor	Ashok Saraf – Gosht Dhamal Namyachi	Best Actress	Ranjana – Savitri
1985
Best Film	Dhoom Dhadaka	Best Director	Mahesh Kothare – Dhoom Dhadaka
Best Actor	Laxmikant Berde – Dhoom Dhadaka	Best Actress	Usha Naik – Devashappath Khare Sangen
1994
Best Actor	Vikram Gokhale – Vazir	Best Actress	Sukanya Kulkarni – Varsa Laxmicha
1995
Best Film	Aai		
Best Actor	Sayaji Shinde – Aboli	Best Actress	Renuka Shahane – Aboli
1996
Best Actor	Ashok Saraf – Suna Yeti Ghara	Best Actress	Sonali Kulkarni – Doghi
1997
Best Actor	Mohan Joshi – Raosaheb	Best Actress	Sukanya Kulkarni – Sarkarnama
1998
Best Film	Tu Tithe Mee		
Best Actor	Mohan Joshi – Tu Tithe Mee	Best Actress	Suhas Joshi – Tu Tithe Mee
1999
Best Film	Bindhaast	Best Director	Chandrakant Kulkarni – Bindhaast
Best Actor	Dilip Prabhavalkar – Ratra Aarambh	Best Actress	Sharvari Jamenis – Bindhaast
Best Music Director	Shridhar Phadke – Lekroo		

== Ceremonies ==
- 1st Filmfare Awards Marathi, was held on 20 November 2015 in Thane, Maharashtra
- 2nd Filmfare Awards Marathi, was held on 28 November 2016 in Mumbai, Maharashtra
- 3rd Filmfare Awards Marathi, was held on 27 October 2017 in Mumbai, Maharashtra
- 4th Filmfare Awards Marathi, was held on 27 September 2018 in Mumbai, Maharashtra
- 5th Filmfare Awards Marathi, was held on 28 February 2021 in Mumbai, Maharashtra
- 6th Filmfare Awards Marathi, was held on 31 March 2022 in Bandra, Mumbai
- 7th Filmfare Awards Marathi, was held on 27 March 2023 in Mulund, Mumbai
- 8th Filmfare Awards Marathi, was held on 18 April 2024 in Mahakavi Kalidas Natyamandir, Mumbai
- 9th Filmfare Awards Marathi, was held on 10 July 2025 in Hotel Sahara Star, Mumbai
- 10th Filmfare Awards Marathi, will held on 6 August 2026 in Hotel Sahara Star, Mumbai

== See also ==
- Filmfare Awards
- Marathi Cinema
- Cinema of India
