= 8th Filmfare Awards Marathi =

Indian film awards

8th Filmfare Marathi Awards
- Presented on: 18 April 2024
- Site: Mahakavi Kalidas Natyamandir, Mumbai
- Hosted by: Amey Wagh, Siddharth Chandekar
- Organized by: R R Kabel Ltd

Highlights
- Best Film: Baipan Bhaari Deva; Aatmapamphlet
- Best Critic: Baaplyok; Naal 2
- Most awards: Aatmapamphlet & Unaad(5)
- Most nominations: Baipan Bhaari Deva & Unaad (16)

The 8th Filmfare Marathi Awards was a ceremony, presented by R R Kabel Ltd, that honored the best Indian Marathi-language films of 2023.

Baipan Bhaari Deva and Unaad led the ceremony with 16 nominations each, followed by Jhimma 2 with 13 nominations and Baaplyok with 12 nominations.

Aatmapamphlet and Unaad dominated the ceremony, each securing 5 awards, former winning the Best Film and Best Director, whereas latter winning in categories like Best Director Debut, Best Lyricist and Best Female Playback Singer. Naal 2 was the runner-up, bagging 4 awards, which included Best Film Critics, Best Supporting Actor and Best Child Artist.

== Ceremony ==
It will be held at Mahakavi Kalidas Natyamandir, the 8th Filmfare Marathi Awards honored the films released in 2023. At a press conference helmed by editor of Filmfare magazine, revealed R R Kabel Ltd as the title sponsor. Actors Amey Wagh and Siddharth Chandekar were announced as the co-hosts, while actor Prajakta Mali, Prarthana Behere, Vaibhav Tatwawadi and Shruti Marathe were announced to be performing during the event. It will take place on 18 April 2024.

== Winners and nominees ==
The nominations were announced by Filmfare on 13 April 2024.

| Best Film | Best Director |
|---|---|
| Baipan Bhaari Deva; Aatmapamphlet; Baaplyok; Jhimma 2; Unaad; Vaalvi | Ashish Avinash Bende – Aatmapamphlet; Aditya Sarpotdar – Unaad; Hemant Dhome – Jhimma 2; Kedar Shinde – Baipan Bhaari Deva; Makarand Mane – Baaplyok; Paresh Mokashi – Vaalvi |
| Best Actor | Best Actress |
| Shashank Shende – Baaplyok; Amey Wagh – Jaggu Ani Juliet; Ankush Chaudhari – Maharashtra Shahir; Onkar Bhojane – Sarla Ek Koti; Swapnil Joshi – Vaalvi | Gauri Deshpande – Shyamchi Aai; Isha Keskar – Sarla Ek Koti; Priyadarshini Indalkar – Phulrani; Rohini Hattangadi – Baipan Bhaari Deva; Vandana Gupte – Baipan Bhaari Deva |
| Best Supporting Actor | Best Supporting Actress |
| Jitendra Joshi – Naal 2; Vitthal Kale – Baaplyok; Pravin Dalimkar – Ghar Banduk Biryani; Sayaji Shinde – Ghar Banduk Biryani; Sandeep Pathak – Shyamchi Aai; Subodh Bhave – Vaalvi | Anita Date-Kelkar – Vaalvi; Nirmiti Sawant – Jhimma 2; Deepti Devi – Naal 2; Suhas Joshi – Jhimma 2; Shilpa Navalkar – Baipan Bhaari Deva; Sukanya Kulkarni – Baipan Bhaari Deva |
Best Director Debut
Devendra Gaikwad – Chowk
| Best Male Debut | Best Female Debut |
| Ashitosh Gaikwad – Unaad | Priyadarshini Indalkar – Phulrani |
| Best Music Director | Best Lyricist |
| Ajay Atul – Maharashtra Shahir; Sai-Piyush – Baipan Bhaari Deva; AV Prafullachandra – Ghar Banduk Biryani; AV Prafullachandra – Naal 2; Amitraj – Jhimma 2; Gulraj Singh – Unaad | Guru Thakur – "Kshan Kaalche" – Unaad; Guru Thakur – "Umagaya Baap Ra" – Baaplyok; Aditi Dravid – "Mangalagaur" – Baipan Bhaari Deva; Valay Mulgund – "Baipan Bhari Deva" – Baipan Bhari Deva; Kshitij Patwardhan – "Rang Jarasa Ola" – Jhimma 2; Vaibhav Deshmukh – "Aaha Hero" – Ghar Banduk Biryani |
| Best Playback Singer – Male | Best Playback Singer – Female |
| Jayesh Khare, Mayur Sukale – "Gau Nako Kisna" – Maharashtra Shahir; Adarsh Shinde – "Marathi Pori" – Jhimma 2; Ajay Gogavale – "Umagaya Baap Ra" – Baaplyok; Ajay Gogavale – "Jay Jay Maharashtra" – Maharashtra Shahir; Jayesh Khare, Master Avan – "Darav Darav" – Naal 2; Gulraj Singh – "Hori Jayee Re" – Unaad | Nandini Srikar – "Kshan Kaalche" – Unaad; Kadubai Kharat – "Bhingori" – Naal 2; Savani Ravindra – "Mangalagaur" – Baipan Bhaari Deva; Shreya Ghoshal – "Baharla Ha Madhumas" – Maharashtra Shahir; Shreya Ghoshal – "Rang Jarasa Ols" – Jhimma 2; Vaishali Samant, Mugdha Karhade – "Marathi Pori" – Jhimma 2 |

Critics' awards

Best Film
Makarand Mane – Baaplyok; Sudhakar Reddy Yakkanti – Naal 2; Ashish Avinash Bende – Aatmapamphlet; Sujay Dahake – Shyamchi Aai; Aditya Sarpotdar – Unaad
| Best Actor | Best Actress |
| Ankush Chaudhari – Maharashtra Shahir; Ajay Purkar – Subhedar; Ashitosh Gaikwad – Unaad; Shashank Shende – Baaplyok; Nagaraj Manjule – Ghar Banduk Biryani; Om Bhutkar – Shyamchi Aai | Rohini Hattangadi – Baipan Bhaari Deva; Gauri Deshpande – Shyamchi Aai; Madhura Velankar – Butterfly; Sonali Kulkarni – Sshort And Ssweet |

Technical Awards

| Best Story | Best Screenplay |
|---|---|
| Ashish Avinash Bende – Aatmapamphlet; Aditya Sarpotdar, Saurabh Bhave – Unaad; Madhugandha Kulkarni, Paresh Mokashi – Vaalvi; Hemant Dhome – Jhimma 2; Vitthal Kale – Baaplyok; Sudhakar Reddy Yakkanti – Naal 2; Vaishali Naik – Baipan Bhaari Deva | Madhugandha Kulkarni, Paresh Mokashi – Vaalvi; Aditya Sarpotdar, Saurabh Bhave – Unaad; Makarand Mane, Vitthal Kale – Baaplyok; Paresh Mokashi – Aatmapamphlet; Sudhakar Reddy Yakkanti – Naal 2; Vaishali Naik – Baipan Bhaari Deva |
| Best Dialogue | Best Editing |
| Paresh Mokashi – Aatmapamphlet; Digpal Lanjekar – Subhedar; Irawati Karnik – Jhimma 2; Makarand Mane, Vitthal Kale – Baaplyok; Vaishali Naik – Baipan Bhaari Deva | Faisal Mahadik, Imran Mahadik – Aatmapamphlet; Abhijeet Deshpande, Saurabh Prabhudesai – Vaalvi; B Mahanteshwar – Shyamchi Aai; Faisal Mahadik, Imran Mahadik – Unaad; Kutub Inamdar – Ghar Banduk Biryani; Mayur Hardas – Chowk |
| Best Cinematography | Best Production Design |
| Lawrence Dcunha – Unaad; Satyajeet Shobha Shreeram – Aatmapamphlet; Satyajeet Shobha Shreeram – Vaalvi; Sudhakar Reddy Yakkanti – Naal 2; Vasudev Rane – Maharashtra Shahir; Vijay Mishra – Shyamchi Aai | Ameya Bhalerao – Shyamchi Aai; Baban Adagale – Aatmapamphlet; Eknath Kadam – Maharashtra Shahir; Mahesh Kudalkar – Baipan Bhaari Deva; Mahesh Kudalkar – Unaad; Pratik Redij – Subhedar |
| Best Sound Design | Best Background Score |
| Anmol Bhave – Ghar Banduk Biryani; Anthony Ruban – Naal 2; Atul Deshpande – Baipan Bhaari Deva; Pranam Pansare – Unaad; Shantanu Akerkar, Dinesh Uchil – Jhimma 2; Shishir Chousalkar – Vaalvi | Gulraj Singh – Unaad; Aditya Bedekar – Jhimma 2; Advait Nemalekar – Naal 2; Saket Kanetkar – Aatmapamphlet; Saket Kanetkar, Abha Soumitra – Shyamchi Aai; Vijay Narayn Gavande – Baaplyok |
Best Costume Design
Namdeo Waghmare – Shyamchi Aai; Kalyani Gugle – Unaad; Sachin Lovalekar – Aatmapamphlet; Tanaji Jadhav – Subhedar; Yugesha Omkar – Maharashtra Shahir

Special awards

Lifetime Achievement Award
- Suhas Joshi
Best Child Artist
- Shrinivas Pokale – Naal 2
- Treesha Thosar – Naal 2

== Superlatives ==
Multiple nominations
| Nominations | Film |
|---|---|
| 16 | Baipan Bhaari Deva |
| 16 | Unaad |
| 13 | Jhimma 2 |
| 12 | Baaplyok |
| 11 | Aatmapamphlet |
| 11 | Naal 2 |
| 10 | Vaalvi |
| 10 | Shyamchi Aai |
| 9 | Maharashtra Shahir |
| 7 | Ghar Banduk Biryani |
| 4 | Subhedar |
| 2 | Sarla Ek Koti |

Multiple wins
| Awards | Film |
|---|---|
| 5 | Unaad |
| 5 | Aatmapamphlet |
| 4 | Naal 2 |
| 3 | Baaplyok |
| 3 | Shyamchi Aai |
| 3 | Maharashtra Shahir |
| 2 | Baipan Bhaari Deva |
| 2 | Vaalvi |
