= Filmfare Award for Best Film – Marathi =

Indian award for Marathi language films

Filmfare Award Marathi for Best Film
- Awarded for: Best Film
- Country: India
- Presented by: Filmfare
- First award: Maza Hoshil Ka (1963)
- Currently held by: Ata Thambaycha Naay! (2025)
- Website: Filmfare Awards

The Filmfare Award for Best Film is given by the Filmfare magazine as part of its annual Filmfare Awards for Marathi Cinemas.

The award was first given in 1963. Following is the complete list of the award winners and nominees. Each individual entry shows the title followed by the production company and the producer.

== Winner and nominees ==
=== 1960s ===
Year	Film	Studio(s)
1963
1963	Maza Hoshil Ka	L.B.Thakur
1963	No Other Nominees	
1964
1964	Sant Nivrutti Dnyandev	Vinayakrao Saraswate and Bal Chavan
1964	No Other Nominees	
1965
1965	Laxmi Ali Ghari	Madhav Shinde
1965	No Other Nominees	
1966
1966	Gurukilli	Raja Paranjape
1966	No Other Nominees	
1967
1967	Pavna Kathcha Dhondi	Vinayak Thakur
1967	No Other Nominees	
1968
1968	Ektee	G. Chaugle
1968	No Other Nominees	
1969
1969	Jiwhala	Atmaram
1969	No Other Nominees	

=== 1970s ===
Year	Film	Studio(s)
1970
1970	Aparadh	Sharad Pilgaonkar
1970	No Other Nominees	
1971
1971	Shantata! Court Chalu Aahe	Satyadev Dubey
1971	No Other Nominees	
1972
1972	Kunku Maze Bhagyache	Shamrao Mane
1972	No Other Nominees	
1973
1973	Andhala Marto Dola	Dada Kondke
1973	No Other Nominees	
1974
1974	Sugandhi Katta	Ram Kadam, Yasil S Ferechal
1974	No Other Nominees	
1975
1975	Samna	Giriraj Pictures
1975	No Other Nominees	
1976
1976	Aaram Haram Aahe	Prem Chitra
1976	No Other Nominees	
1977
1977	Naav Motha Lakshan Khota	Sharad Pilgaonkar
1977	No Other Nominees	
1978
1978	Devaki Nandan Gopala	Daddy Deshmukh
1978	No Other Nominees	
1979
1979	Sinhasan	D.V.Rao and Jabbar Patel
1979	No Other Nominees	

=== 1980s ===
Year	Film	Studio(s)
1980
1980	22 June 1897	Jayoo Patwardhan
1980	No Other Nominees	
1981
1981	Umbartha	Sujata Chitra
1981	No Other Nominees	
1982
1982	Shapit	Troyka Films Combine
1982	No Other Nominees	
1983
1983	Gupchup Gupchup	Shivshakti Productions
1983	No Other Nominees	
1984
1984	Lek Chalali Sasarla	Rasikraj Productions
1984	No Other Nominees	
1985
1985	Dhum Dhadaka	Jenma Films International
1985	No Other Nominees	

=== 1990s ===
Year	Film	Studio(s)
1995
1995	Aai	Mahesh Manjrekar
1995	No Other Nominees	
1996
1996	Doghi	National Film Development Corporation of India, Doordarshan
1996	No Other Nominees	
1997
1997	Raosaheb	K.B.Joshi, Ravindra Surve
1997	No Other Nominees	
1998
1998	Tu Tithe Mee	Asmita Chitra
1998	No Other Nominees	
1999
1999	Bindhaast	Macchindra Chate
1999	No Other Nominees	

=== 2010s ===
Year	Film	Studio(s)
2014
2014	Dr. Prakash Baba Amte – The Real Hero	Essel Vision Productions
2014	Elizabeth Ekadashi	Essel Vision Productions, Mayasabha productions
2014	Fandry	Navlakha Arts
2014	Lai Bhaari	Mumbai Film Company, Cinemantra Production
2014	Rege	Ravi Jadhav Films
2014	Yellow	Mumbai Film Company
2016
2016	Katyar Kaljat Ghusali	Essel Vision Productions
2016	Lokmanya: Ek Yugpurush	Neena Raut Films
2016	Court	Zoo Entertainment
2016	Double Seat	Essel Vision Productions, HUGE Productions, Pratisaad Productions
2016	Mumbai-Pune-Mumbai 2	Yashila Enterprises
2016	Killa	Essel Vision Productions
2017		
2017	Sairat	Zee Studios, Essel Vision Productions, Aatpat Productions
2017	Natsamrat	Fincraft Media and Entertainment Pvt. Ltd., Gajanan Chitra, Great Maratha Entertainment
2017	Ventilator	Purple Pebble Pictures
2017	Vazandar	Landmarc Films
2017	Family Katta	Sister Concern
2018
2018	Kachcha Limboo	Swaroop Recreation & Media Pvt. Ltd
2018	Faster Fene	Mumbai Film Company, Zee Studios
2018	Ti Saddhya Kay Karte	Zee Studios
2018	Muramba	Dashami Studioz, HUGE Productions, Pratisaad Productions
2018	Lapachhapi	A Midas Touch Movies
2018	Hrudayantar	Vikram Phadnis Productions

=== 2020s ===
Year	Film	Studio(s)
2020
2020	Anandi Gopal	Zee Studios
2020	Hirkani	Irada Entertainment
2020	Aatpadi Nights	Maaydesh Media
2020	Fatteshikast	Almond Creations
2020	Girlfriend	Huge Production, Pratishad Production, Triple Ace Entertainment
2020	Smile Please	Everest Entertainment, Sunshine Studios
2021
2021	Jhimma	Chalchitra Mandalee, Crazy Few Films
2021	Karkhanisanchi Waari	Nine Archers Pictures Company, ABP Studios
2021	Dhurala	Zee Studios, Pratisaad Productions
2021	Jayanti	Meliorist Film Studio
2021	Basta	Shree Ganesh Marketing And Films
2021	Vegli Vaat	Imaginit Productions
2022
2022	Godavari	Blue Drop Films, Jitendra Joshi Productions
2022	Chandramukhi	Planet Marathi, Golden Ratio Films, Flying Dragon Entertainment, Creative Vibe
2022	Dharmaveer	Zee Studios, Mangesh Desai
2022	Me Vasantrao	Jio Studios
2022	Panghrun	Zee Studios, Mahesh Manjrekar Movies
2022	Pawankhind	Almond Creations
2022	Sarsenapati Hambirrao	Urvita Productions
2023
2023	Baipan Bhaari Deva	Jio Studios, EmVeeBee Media
2023	Aatmapamphlet	T-Series, Colour Yellow Productions, Zee Studios
2023	Baaplyok	99 Productions, Bahuroopi Productions
2023	Jhimma 2	Chalchitra Mandalee, Jio Studios, Colour Yellow Productions, Crazy Few Films
2023	Unaad	Jio Studios, Aurora Productions, Artha Creations, Namrata Arts
2023	Vaalvi	Zee Studios
2024
2024	Paani	Purple Pebble Pictures, Rajshri Entertainment, Kothare Vision
2024	Dharmaveer 2	Zee Studios, Sahil Motion Arts
2024	Gharat Ganpati	Panorama Studios, Navigns Studio
2024	Juna Furniture	Skylink Entertainment, Satya Saiee Films
2024	Naach Ga Ghuma	Hiranyagarbha Manoranjan
2024	Phullwanti	Panorama Studios, Mangesh Pawar & Company, Shivoham Creations Pvt. Ltd
2025
2025	Ata Thambaycha Naay!	Chalk and Cheese Films, Film Jazz, Zee Studios
2025	April May 99	Mapuskar Brothers, Fingerprint Films, Nexus Alliance, Think Tank
2025	Dashavatar	Ocean Film Company, Ocean Art House
2025	Fussclass Dabhade	T-Series, Colour Yellow Productions, Chalchitra Mandalee
2025	Jarann	Anees Bazmee Productions, A & N Cinema's LLP, A3 Events & Media Services
2025	Sthal - A Match	Dhun Productions
