= Baapjanma =

- Theatrical release poster
- Directed by: Nipun Dharmadhikari
- Written by: Nipun Dharmadhikari
- Produced by: Sumatilal Shah
- Starring: Sachin Khedekar; Pushkaraj Chirputkar; Sharvari Lohokare; Akash Khurana
- Cinematography: Abhijeet Abde
- Edited by: Suchitra Sathe
- Music by: Gandhaar
- Production company: Sixteen by Sixty-Four Productions
- Release date: 29 September 2017
- Running time: 121 minutes
- Country: India
- Language: Marathi

Baapjanma is a 2017 Indian Marathi social drama directed by Nipun Dharmadhikari. This is Dharamdhikari's second film although it released first. The story revolves around a retired and widowed intelligence officer who is estranged from his married children, who suddenly becomes terminally ill and then sets out to make amends using unconventional methods, with an unexpected ending.

The film stars Sachin Khedekar, Pushkaraj Chirputkar and Akash Khurana. The movie was released on 29 September 2017 in India and received a positive response from both critics and audience.

== Cast ==
- Sachin Khedekar as Bhaskar Pandit
- Pushkaraj Chirputkar as Mauli
- Sharvari Lohokare as Veena
- Satyajeet Patwardhan as Vikram
- Akash Khurana as Ashok Khurana

== Reception ==
A critic from The Times of India wrote that "Every film has a USP [universal selling point] but Baapjanma has more than one. It is a team effort in the true sense of the term. This one is definitely worth a watch". A critic from Cinestaan wrote that "Overall, Baapjanma is a fine entertainer that will move you". A critic from Pune Mirror wrote that "Nipun Dharmadhikari carefully balances the plot, never letting it lose the seriousness of the premise, allowing the moments of laughter and reflection alternately".

== Nominations ==
- 4th Jio Filmfare Awards Marathi 2018 - Best Actor (Male) - Sachin Khedekar
