= Filmfare Award for Best Female Playback Singer – Marathi =

Award in India for Marathi films

Filmfare Award Marathi for Best Female Playback Singer
- Awarded for: Best Performance by a Female Playback Singer
- Country: India
- Presented by: Filmfare
- First award: Ketaki Mategaonkar, Timepass "Mala Ved Lagale" (2014)
- Currently held by: Nihira Joshi, Ata Thambaycha Naay! "Chal Re Mana Jaau" (2025)
- Website: Filmfare Awards

The Filmfare Best Female Playback Singer Award is given by the Filmfare magazine as part of its annual Filmfare Awards for Marathi Cinema to the best male playback singer of a soundtrack. The award in this category was first presented in 2014. Ketaki Mategaonkar was the first recipient of this award for her song "Mala Ved Lagale" from the film Lai Bhaari.

== Superlatives ==
Superlative	Artist	Record
Most nominations	Shreya Ghoshal	8
Most nominations without ever winning	Shreya Ghoshal	8
Most consecutive year nominations	Shreya Ghoshal	4

== List of winners and nominees ==
=== 2010s ===
Year	Photos of winners	Singer	Song	Film	Ref.
2014		Ketaki Mategaonkar	"Mala Ved Lagale"	Timepass	
2014		Bela Shende	"Baavare Prem He"	Baavare Prem He	
2014		Vaishali Samant	"Don Disachi Saawali"	Tapaal	
2014		Madhura Datar	"Loot Liyo"	Rama Madhav	
2014		Kirti Killedar	"Mani Achanak"	Dusari Goshta	
2015		Aanandi Joshi	"Kiti Sangaychay Mala"	Double Seat	
2015		Janhavi Prabhu Arora	"Saavar Re"	Mitwaa	
2015		Aanandi Joshi	"Dhaga Dhaga"	Dagadi Chawl	
2015		Bela Shende	"Saadh Hi Preetichi"	Mumbai-Pune-Mumbai 2	
2015		Bela Shende	"Roz Mala"	Classmates	
2016		Chinmayi Sripada	"Sairat Zaala Ji"	Sairat	
2016		Shreya Ghoshal	"Aatach Baya"	Sairat	
2016		Ketaki Mategaonkar	"Priyankara"	YZ	
2016		Ketaki Mategaonkar	"Kasa Jeev Guntala"	Phuntroo	
2016		Vibhavari Apte Joshi	"Natyas Naav Apulya"	Natsamrat	
2016		Neha Rajpal	"Tu Jithe"	Photocopy	
2017	–	Anuradha Kuber	"Maze Tuze"	Muramba	
2017	–	Aarya Ambekar	"Jara Jara"	Ti Saddhya Kay Karte	
2017	–	Neha Rajpal	"Tula Kalnnaar Nahi"	Tula Kalnnaar Nahi	
2017	–	Rupali Moghe	"Marugelara Ho Raghava"	Hampi	
2017	–	Aanandi Joshi	"Vate Vari"	Hrudayantar	
2018	NO CEREMONY				
2019	NO CEREMONY				

=== 2020s ===
Year	Photos of winners	Singer	Song	Film	Ref.
2020		Shalmali Kholgade	"Querida Querida"	Girlfriend	
2020		Ketaki Mategaonkar & Sharayu Date	"Rang Maliyela"	Anandi Gopal	
2020		Priyanka Barve	"Waata Waata Ga"	Anandi Gopal	
2020		Shreya Ghoshal	"Baghta Tula Me"	Premvari	
2020		Ronkini Gupta	"Tula Japnar Ahe"	Khari Biscuit	
2020		Madhura Kumbhar	"Jagna He Nyara Jhala Ji"	Hirkani	
2021		Apeksha Dandekar	"Maze Gaon"	Jhimma	
2021		Shreya Ghoshal	"Navasa Ishara"	Bonus	
2021		Devaki Pandit	"Jeevanacha Sohala"	AB Aani CD	
2021		Vaishali Samant	"Bhurum Bhurum"	Pandu	
2021		Yashita Sharma	"Mann Fakiraa"	Mann Fakiraa	
2022 (7th)		Aarya Ambekar	"Bai Ga"	Chandramukhi	
2022 (7th)		Shreya Ghoshal	"Chandra"	Chandramukhi	
2022 (7th)		Shreya Ghoshal	"Sukh Kalale"	Ved	
2022 (7th)		Shreya Ghoshal	"Ram Ram"	Me Vasantrao	
2022 (7th)		Priyanka Barve	"Bindiya Le Gayi"	Me Vasantrao	
2022 (7th)		Aanandi Joshi	"Rang Lagala"	Tamasha Live	
2023 (8th)	–	Nandini Srikar	"Kshan Kaalche"	Unaad	
2023 (8th)	–	Savani Ravindra	"Mangalagaur"	Baipan Bhaari Deva	
2023 (8th)	–	Vaishali Samant, Mugdha Karhade	"Marathi Pori"	Jhimma 2	
2023 (8th)	–	Shreya Ghoshal	"Rang Jarasa"	Jhimma 2	
2023 (8th)	–	Shreya Ghoshal	"Baharla Ha Madhumas"	Maharashtra Shahir	
2023 (8th)	–	Kadubai Kharat	"Bhingori"	Naal 2	
2024 (9th)		Vaishali Mhade	"Madanmanjiri"	Phullwanti	
2024 (9th)		Aarya Ambekar	"Phullwanti Title Track"	Phullwanti	
2024 (9th)		Cyli Khare	"Vasarachi Aai"	Gharat Ganpati	
2024 (9th)		Priyanka Barve	"Mrugtrushna"	Hee Anokhi Gaath	
2024 (9th)		Shalmali Kholgade	"Saala Character"	Alibaba Aani Chalishitale Chor	
2024 (9th)		Vaishali Samant	"Naach Ga Ghuma Title Track"	Naach Ga Ghuma	
2025 (10th)	–	Nihira Joshi-Deshpande	"Chal Re Mana Jaau"	Ata Thambaycha Naay!	
2025 (10th)	–	Aanandi Joshi	"Title Track"	Ata Thambaycha Naay!	
2025 (10th)	–	Aanandi Joshi	"Dis Sarale"	Fussclass Dabhade	
2025 (10th)	–	Aarya Ambekar	"Chandana"	Gondhal	
2025 (10th)	–	Ronkini Gupta	"Asen Mi"	Uttar	
2025 (10th)	–	Radhika Bhide	"Ho Aai"	Uttar	
2025 (10th)	–	Swanandi Sardesai	"Rutuchakra"	Dashavatar	
