= Filmfare Award for Best Cinematographer – Marathi =

Indian award for Marathi language films

Filmfare Marathi Awards for Best Cinematography
- Awarded for: Best Performance by a Cinematographer
- Country: India
- Presented by: Filmfare
- First award: Vikram Amladi, Fandry (2014)
- Currently held by: Amalendu Chaudhary, Gondhal (2025)
- Website: Filmfare Awards

The Filmfare Marathi Award for Best Screenplay is given by Filmfare, a magazine in India, as part of its annual Filmfare Awards for Marathi films.

== Winner and nominees ==
=== 2010s ===
Year	Recipient(s)	Film
2014	Vikram Amladi	Fandry
2014	Laxman Utekar	Tapaal
2014	Mahesh Limaye	Rege
2014	Amol Gole	Elizabeth Ekadashi
2014	Yogesh Rajguru	Postcard
2015	Avinash Arun	Killa
2016	Sanjay K. Memane	Half Ticket
2016	Milind Jog	Vazandar
2016	Ameya Chavan	Kaul: A Calling
2016	Sudhakar Reddy Yakkanti	Sairat
2016	Savita Singh	Ventilator
2017	Amalendu Chaudhary	Hampi
2017	Amalendu Chaudhary	Kachcha Limboo
2017	Milind Jog	Muramba
2017	Milind Jog	Faster Fene
2017	Dhananjay Kulkarni	Kaasav
2017	Abhijit Abde	Ringan

=== 2020s ===
Year	Recipient(s)	Film
2020	Akash Agarwal	Anandi Gopal
2020	Arjun Sorte	Baba
2020	Dhananjay Kulkarni	Welcome Home
2020	Milind Jog	Girlfriend
2020	Milind Jog	Smile Please
2020	Reshmi Sarkar	Fatteshikast
2021	Michał Sobociński	The Disciple
2021	Girish Jambhalikar	Mhorkya
2021	Akash Agarwal	Dhurala
2021	Archana Borhade	Karkhanisanchi Waari
2021	Shakil Khan	Vegali Vaat
2021	Kedar Phadke	Photo Prem
2022 (7th)	Mahesh Limaye	Sarsenapati Hambirrao
2022 (7th)	Bhushankumar Jain	Ved
2022 (7th)	Abhimanyu Dange	Me Vasantrao
2022 (7th)	Shamin Kulkarni	Godavari
2022 (7th)	Milind Jog	Pondicherry
2022 (7th)	Karan B. Rawat	Pangharun
2023 (8th)	Lawrence Dcunha	Unaad
2023 (8th)	Satyajeet Shobha Shreeram	Aatmapamphlet
2023 (8th)	Satyajeet Shobha Shreeram	Vaalvi
2023 (8th)	Sudhakar Reddy Yakkanti	Naal 2
2023 (8th)	Vasudev Rane	Maharashtra Shahir
2023 (8th)	Vijay Mishra	Shyamchi Aai
2024 (9th)	Mahesh Limaye	Phullwanti
2024 (9th)	Ajit Reddy	Juna Furniture
2024 (9th)	Gulam N.S	Ole Aale
2024 (9th)	Shelly Sharma, Prasad Bhende	Gharat Ganpati
2024 (9th)	Rahul Ramchandra Pawar, Gururaj Bakshi, Akshay Ingle	Khadmod
2024 (9th)	Arjun Sorte	Paani
2024 (9th)	Udit Khurana	Ghaath
2025 (10th)	Amalendu Chaudhary	Gondhal
2025 (10th)	Apoorva Shaligram	April May 99
2025 (10th)	Devendra Golatkar	Dashavatar
2025 (10th)	Manoj Karmakar	Sthal
2025 (10th)	Milind Jog	Jarann
2025 (10th)	Sandeep J.N. Yadav	Ata Thambaycha Naay!
2025 (10th)	Vikas Urs	Sabar Bonda

== See also ==
- Filmfare Awards Marathi
- Filmfare Awards
- Filmfare Award for Best Background Score – Marathi
- Filmfare Award for Best Editing – Marathi
