= Unaad =

- Official release poster
- Directed by: Aditya Sarpotdar
- Written by: Screenplay and Story: Aditya Sarpotdar; Saurabh Bhave; Dialogues: Kalyani Pandit
- Produced by: Jyoti Deshpande; Ajit Arora; Chandresh Bhanushali; Pritesh Thakkar
- Starring: Abhishek Bharate; Devika Daftardar; Ashutosh Gaikwad; Hemal Ingle; Chinmay Jadhav
- Cinematography: Lawrence D'Cunha
- Edited by: Faisal Mahadik; Imran Mahadik
- Music by: Gulraj Singh
- Production companies: Jio Studios; Aurora Productions; Artha Creations; Namrata Arts
- Distributed by: JioCinema
- Release date: 8 July 2023
- Country: India
- Language: Marathi

Unaad is a 2023 Indian Marathi-language musical drama film directed by Aditya Sarpotdar, starring Abhishek Bharate, Devika Daftardar, Ashutosh Gaikwad, Hemal Ingle and Chinmay Jadhav. The film was released on 8 July 2023 on JioCinema.

The film was chosen for Zlin International Film Festival to compete international competition of feature films. Unaad is screened at MAMI (Mumbai Academy of the Moving Image).

== Plot ==
The film based on the hardships and lifestyles of three young people from the Koli community.

== Cast ==
- Ashutosh Gaikwad as Shubham
- Abhishek Bharate as Bandya
- Devika Daftardar as Bandya's mother
- Hemal Ingle as Swara
- Chinmay Jadhav as Jamil
- Avinash Khedekar as Parag
- Pravin Prabhakar as Haldi song Andhor
- Priyanka Tendolkar as Swara's sister

== Production ==
The filming is completed in Konkan, where casting process was done.

== Release ==
The film digitally premiered on 8 July 2023 on JioCinema.

== Soundtrack ==
Unaad

Soundtrack album by Gulraj Singh
- Released: 2023
- Genre: Feature film soundtrack
- Length: 24:01
- Language: Marathi
- Label: Zee Music Company

Official audio
- Unaad - Full Album on YouTube

All music is composed by Gulraj Singh.

Track listing
No.	Title	Lyrics	Singer (s)	Length
1.	"Yeda Mandola"	Kshitij Patwardhan	Nakash Aziz, Gulraj Singh	2:10
2.	"Halad Vajude"	Guru Thakur	Anand Shinde	2:58
3.	"Mann Taara"	Kshitij Patwardhan	Gulraj Singh, Shashaa Tirupati	4:10
4.	"Kshan Kaalche"	Guru Thakur	Nandini Srikar, Gulraj Singh	6:03
5.	"Hori Jayee Re"	Guru Thakur	Divya Kumar, Gulraj Singh	4:27
Total length:				24:01

== Reception ==
Kalpeshraj Kubal of Maharashtra Times gave three stars out of five stars, praised music, performances and cinematography. A reviewer from Sakal wrote that the film guides and introspects the children who are on the verge of adulthood. Reshma Raikwar of Loksatta observed it is a very different experience, which tries to offer a lot along with smooth, pure entertainment, using the wonderful use of visuals, dialogues, acting, background music, to create a depth of understanding beyond what is shown."

== Awards and nominations ==
Award	Category	Recipient(s) and nominee(s)	Result	Ref.
8th Filmfare Awards Marathi	Best Debut Male	Ashutosh Gaikwad	Won	
8th Filmfare Awards Marathi	Best Film	Jio Studios Aurora Productions Artha Creations Namrata Arts	Nominated	
8th Filmfare Awards Marathi	Best Music Director	Gulraj Singh	Nominated	
8th Filmfare Awards Marathi	Best Lyricist	Guru Thakur for song "Kshan Kaalache"	Won	
8th Filmfare Awards Marathi	Best Male Playback Singer	Gulraj Singh for song "Hori Jayee re"	Nominated	
8th Filmfare Awards Marathi	Best Female Playback Singer	Nandini Srikar for song "Kshan Kaalache "	Won	
8th Filmfare Awards Marathi	Critics Award for Best Film	Aditya Sarpotdar	Nominated	
8th Filmfare Awards Marathi	Best Director	Aditya Sarpotdar	Nominated	
8th Filmfare Awards Marathi	Critics Award for Best Actor	Ashutosh Gaikwad	Nominated	
8th Filmfare Awards Marathi	Best Story	Aditya Sarpotdar and Saurabh Bhave	Nominated	
8th Filmfare Awards Marathi	Best Screenplay	Aditya Sarpotdar and Saurabh Bhave	Nominated	
8th Filmfare Awards Marathi	Best Editing	Faisal Mahadik, Imran Mahadik	Nominated	
8th Filmfare Awards Marathi	Best Cinematography	Lawrence D'Cunha	Won	
8th Filmfare Awards Marathi	Best Production Design	Mahesh Kudalkar	Nominated	
8th Filmfare Awards Marathi	Best Sound Design	Pranam Pansare	Nominated	
8th Filmfare Awards Marathi	Best Costume Design	Kalyani Gugale	Nominated	
