= Filmfare Award for Best Director – Marathi =

Marathi Filmfare Award for Best Director

Filmfare Marathi Award for Best Director
- Awarded for: Best Director
- Country: India
- Presented by: Filmfare
- First award: Jabbar Patel, Samna (1975)
- Currently held by: Shivraj Waichal, Ata Thambaycha Naay! (2025)
- Website: Filmfare Awards

The Filmfare Marathi Best Director Award is one of the main awards given by the annual Filmfare Marathi Awards to recognise directors working in Marathi cinema. It was first presented in 1975.

== Superlatives ==
Superlative	Director	Record
Most awards	Jabbar Patel	4
Most nominations in a single year	Pravin Tarde	2

Jabbar Patel holds the record in the history of the Filmfare Marathi Best Director category, with a total of 4 wins and also the only director to have won the award in two consecutive years. He was also honored with the Lifetime Achievement Award at the 7th Filmfare Awards Marathi. Nagraj Manjule stands out as the only director who has won the award every time he was nominated, with two wins from two nominations. Nachiket Patwardhan has twice received the award, including one joint win with his wife Jayoo Patwardhan.

Among prolific nominees, Mahesh Manjrekar has received four nominations with one win, while Prasad Oak and Chandrakant Kulkarni have one win each from three and two nominations, respectively. Sameer Vidwans was nominated in two consecutive years (2020–2021) and won in 2020 for Anandi Gopal. Vikram Phadnis also earned back-to-back nominations between 2017 and 2020. Paresh Mokashi, despite being nominated three times, including consecutively in 2023 and 2024, has not yet won.

Other directors with two nominations include Satish Rajwade, Aditya Sarpotdar and Digpal Lanjekar. Hemant Dhome has received three nominations without a win and is notable for being nominated for both an original film and its sequel. Remarkably, Pravin Tarde is the only director to achieve two nominations within the same year and, alongside Dhome, shares the distinction of receiving nominations for both an original film and its sequel.

== Winners and nominees ==
=== 1970s ===
- 1975 – Jabbar Patel – Samna
- 1976 – Vasant Joglekar – Ha Khel Sawalyancha
- 1977 – Muralidhar Kapdi – Naav Motha Lakshan Khota
- 1978 – Jabbar Patel – Jait Re Jait
- 1979 – Jabbar Patel – Sinhasan

=== 1980s ===
- 1980 – Nachiket Patwardhan – 22 June 1897
- 1981 – Jabbar Patel – Umbartha
- 1982 – Rajdutt & Arvind Deshpande – Shapit
- 1983 – V. K. Naik – Gupchup Gupchup
- 1984 – N. S. Vaidya – Lek Chalali Sasarla
- 1985 – Mahesh Kothare – Dhoom Dhadaka

=== 1990s ===
- 1994 – Mahesh Manjrekar – Aai
- 1995 – Jayoo Patwardhan and Nachiket Patwardhan – Limited Manuski
- 1996 – Sumitra Bhave–Sunil Sukthankar – Doghi
- 1997 – Shrabani Deodhar – Sarkarnama
- 1998 – Sanjay Surkar – Tu Tithe Mee
- 1999 – Chandrakant Kulkarni – Bindhaast

=== 2010s ===
- 2014 – Nagraj Manjule – Fandry
  - Nishikant Kamat – Lai Bhaari
  - Paresh Mokashi – Elizabeth Ekadashi
  - Abhijit Panse – Rege
  - Mahesh Limaye – Yellow
  - Samruddhi Porey – Dr. Prakash Baba Amte – The Real Hero
- 2015 – Subodh Bhave – Katyar Kaljat Ghusali
  - Avinash Arun – Killa
  - Om Raut – Lokmanya: Ek Yugpurush
  - Chaitanya Tamhane – Court
  - Satish Rajwade – Mumbai-Pune-Mumbai 2
- 2016 – Nagraj Manjule – Sairat
  - Mahesh Manjrekar – Natsamrat
  - Chandrakant Kulkarni – Family Katta
  - Sachin Kundalkar – Vazandar
  - Rajesh Mapuskar – Ventilator
- 2017 – Prasad Oak – Kachcha Limboo
  - Aditya Sarpotdar – Faster Fene
  - Satish Rajwade – Ti Saddhya Kay Karte
  - Vishal Furia – Lapachhapi
  - Vikram Phadnis – Hrudayantar

=== 2020s ===
- 2020 – Sameer Vidwans – Anandi Gopal
  - Prasad Oak – Hirkani
  - Upendra Sidhaye – Girlfriend
  - Digpal Lanjekar – Fatteshikast
  - Vikram Phadnis – Smile Please
  - Nitin Supekar – Aatpadi Nights
- 2021 – Mangesh Joshi – Karkhanisanchi Waari
  - Hemant Dhome – Jhimma
  - Sameer Vidwans – Dhurala
  - Shailesh Narwade – Jayanti
  - Tanaji Ghadge – Basta
  - Achyut Narayan – Vegli Vaat
- 2022 – Nikhil Mahajan – Godavari
  - Digpal Lanjekar – Pawankhind
  - Mahesh Manjrekar – Panghrun
  - Nipun Dharmadhikari – Me Vasantrao
  - Prasad Oak – Chandramukhi
  - Pravin Tarde – Dharmaveer
  - Pravin Tarde – Sarsenapati Hambirrao
- 2023 – Ashish Avinash Bende – Aatmapamphlet
  - Aditya Sarpotdar – Unaad
  - Hemant Dhome – Jhimma 2
  - Kedar Shinde – Baipan Bhaari Deva
  - Makarand Mane – Baaplyok
  - Paresh Mokashi – Vaalvi
- 2024 – Addinath Kothare – Paani
  - Mahesh Manjrekar – Juna Furniture
  - Navjyot Bandiwadekar – Gharat Ganpati
  - Paresh Mokashi – Naach Ga Ghuma
  - Pravin Tarde – Dharmaveer 2
  - Varun Narvekar – Ek Don Teen Chaar
- 2025 – Shivraj Waichal – Ata Thambaycha Naay!
  - Hemant Dhome – Fussclass Dabhade
  - Jayant Digambar Somalkar – Sthal - A Match
  - Rohan Mapuskar – April May 99
  - Rushikesh Gupte – Jarann
  - Subodh Khanolkar – Dashavatar
