= Aatpadi Nights =

2019 film directed by Nitin SinduVijay Supekar

- Theatrical release poster
- Directed by: Nitin SinduVijay Supekar
- Written by: Nitin SinduVijay Supekar
- Produced by: Maaydesh Media
- Starring: Subodh Bhave; Pranav Raorane; Sayali Sanjeev
- Cinematography: Nagraj Divakar; Viru Patil
- Edited by: Nilesh Gavand
- Music by: Vijay Narayan Gavande; Sidharth Dhukate
- Production company: Maaydesh Studio
- Release date: 27 December 2019
- Country: India
- Language: Marathi

Aatpadi Nights is a 2019 Indian Marathi language romantic comedy film directed by Nitin SinduVijay Supekar and produced by the banner of Maaydesh Media. This film presenting by Subodh Bhave and Maaydesh Media. The film starring Subodh Bhave, Pranav Raorane and Sayali Sanjeev. The film was released theatrically on 27 December 2019.

== Cast ==
- Pranav Raorane
- Sayali Sanjeev
- Chhaya Kadam
- Sanjay Kulakarni
- Aarti Wadabgalkar
- Sameer Khandekar
- Jatin Inamdar
- Yogesh Iratkar
- Om Thakur (Child actor)
- Subodh Bhave
- Vivek Rajesh
- Sudhir Nikam
- Vitthal Kale

== Production ==
The film was publicly announced on 2 December 2019, with intensity building official poster of movie with just a closed door with sign of "Do No Disturb" on it and the film title. The film to be directed by Nitin SinduVijay Supekar and produced by Maaydesh Media.

== Soundtrack ==
Aatpadi Nights

Soundtrack album by Vijay Gavande , Sidharth Dhukate
- Released: 2019
- Recorded: 2019
- Genre: Feature film soundtrack
- Length: 3:36
- Language: Marathi

Official audio
- Aatpadi Nights – Full Album on YouTube

The songs for the film are composed by Vijay Narayan Gavande & Sidharth Dhukate and lyrics by Narayan Puri and sung by Adarsh Shinde, Vaishali Mhade and Sanghapal Tayade.

Track list
| No. | Title | Lyrics | Music | Singer(s) | Length |
|---|---|---|---|---|---|
| 1. | "Premacha Jhangadgutta" | Narayan Puri | Vijay Narayan Gavande | Adarsh Shinde, Vaishali Mhade | 3:36 |
| Total length: | | | | | 3:36 |

== Reception ==
Keyur Seta of Cinestaan.com wrote: "The film does suffer from these issues. But it deserves some credit for daring to showcase the stigma faced by people who are considered skinny. A reviewer from ABP Majha wrote: "Standing by the daughter-in-law's side and the realization that finally comes when the wife tells some things are all remarkable. All of them have formed a close-knit family." Ajay Parchure of Lokmat says: "Subodh has brought a great movie to the public. His small role in the movie is also great. Overall, there is no problem in watching this movie, which gives an enjoyable experience on sex education."
