= Muramba =

- Directed by: Varun Narvekar
- Screenplay by: Varun Narvekar
- Produced by: Ranjit Gugle; Anish Jog; Nitin Vaidya; Ninad Vaidya
- Starring: Mithila Palkar; Amey Wagh
- Cinematography: Milind Jog
- Edited by: Vishal Bate
- Music by: Hrishikesh; Saurabh; Jasraj
- Production companies: Dashami Studioz; HUGE Productions; Pratisaad Productions
- Distributed by: Dashami Studioz
- Release date: 2 June 2017
- Country: India
- Language: Marathi
- Box office: ₹7 crore (US$730,000)

Muramba (transl. Sweet and Sour Jam) is a 2017 Marathi-language comedy drama film directed by Varun Narvekar. It stars Amey Wagh and Mithila Palkar. It is directed by a debutant director, Varun Narvekar. The film also features Sachin Khedekar and Chinmayi Sumit in supporting roles. The film portrays the efforts of the parents to fill the generation gap. It is available on Netflix and Sony LIV.

== Plot ==
Alok (Amey Wagh) and Indu (Mithila Palkar) have been dating for three years. Indu works as an executive in an ad agency and is focused on her career. Alok, despite holding a gold medal in the Masters in Business Administration degree works as a substitute accounts teacher at a coaching class. At a party where Indu isn't present, Alok and she break up over the phone. Alok's parents (Sachin Khedekar & Chinmayi Sumit) who are aware and accepting of their relationship, want them to get engaged next year. When Alok informs them of the break-up, they are disturbed and attempt to get him to talk about it, despite his protests. In flashbacks we see Alok feel insecure and jealous when Indu talks of moving to Kerala for a year, befriends male co-workers and is unable to give Alok time and attention because of her job. Alok justifies the break-up by explaining to his parents Indu's changed behaviour, her partying and drinking habits and is firm on not wanting to get back together. His father however, wants to hear Indu's side of the story too. He tricks Alok and his mother into going out to lunch, but also invites Indu, who agrees out of respect towards Alok's parents. In the restaurant things turn awkward when Alok's father gets Indu and Alok to mention each other's best qualities, with Alok saying that Indu is better than him in every way. Later in private, Indu confronts Alok about telling his parents about their break-up and her drinking. She asks Alok why he isn't able to find a steady job, or why he chooses to do random jobs despite having been a gold medallist at college. She leaves abruptly, calling later to apologise to Alok's parents. As they head back home, we see flashbacks to Alok and Indu's last fight, where Indu confronts Alok about not showing up for interviews or leaving jobs half-way. She tells him she has read his emails in an attempt to understand Alok's behaviour and knows that Alok lied to them about why he quit his year-long internship in Boston. She asks him what he's afraid of. Alok, upset and angry at Indu for reading his emails asks her to get out of his house.

In the present day, Alok's parents are preparing for guests to arrive. Alok has completely forgotten that it is his parents' anniversary. When he goes upstairs to fetch his father, Alok catches him listening to an old recording of him talking about Indu. Alok wants to know why his father has been taking Indu's side. Alok's father explains to him that he had seen Alok struggle with fear of failure after his MBA, but was certain that Indu would help him get through it. He explains to Alok that Indu has simply been trying to get Alok out of his comfort zone, but Alok never gave her a chance. Alok realises his mistake and rushes to Indu's house and apologises for the way he treated her. Indu forgives him. The movie ends with Alok and Indu celebrating Alok's parents' anniversary.

== Cast ==
- Mithila Palkar as Indu
- Amey Wagh as Alok
- Sachin Khedekar as Alok's Father
- Chinmayee Sumit as Alok's Mother

== Awards ==
Award	Category	Recipient	Result	Ref
4th Filmfare Awards Marathi	Best Film	Varun Narvekar	Nominated	
4th Filmfare Awards Marathi	Best Director	Varun Narvekar	Nominated	
4th Filmfare Awards Marathi	Best Actor	Amey Wagh	Won	
4th Filmfare Awards Marathi	Best Supporting Actress	Chinmayee Sumeet	Won	
4th Filmfare Awards Marathi	Best Debut Director	Varun Narvekar (share with Makarand Mane)	Won	
4th Filmfare Awards Marathi	Best Female Debut	Mithila Palkar	Won	
4th Filmfare Awards Marathi	Best Male Playback Singer	Jasraj Joshi (for "Muramba")	Nominated	
4th Filmfare Awards Marathi	Best Female Playback Singer	Anuradha Kuber (for "Maze Tuze")	Won	
4th Filmfare Awards Marathi	Best Story	Varun Narvekar	Nominated	
4th Filmfare Awards Marathi	Best Screenplay	Varun Narvekar	Nominated	
4th Filmfare Awards Marathi	Best Dialogue	Varun Narvekar	Won	
4th Filmfare Awards Marathi	Best Production Design	Siddharth Tatooskar	Nominated	
4th Filmfare Awards Marathi	Best Cinematographer	Milind Jog	Nominated	

== Remake ==
The film was remade in 2020 Gujarati film Golkeri.
