= 10th Filmfare Awards Marathi =

Indian film awards

10th Filmfare Marathi Awards
- Presented on: 6 August 2026
- Site: Hotel Sahara Star, Mumbai
- Hosted by: Siddharth Chandekar; Amey Wagh

Highlights
- Best Film: Ata Thambaycha Naay!
- Best Critic: Sabar Bonda; Sthal - A Match
- Most awards: Ata Thambaycha Naay! (8)
- Most nominations: Dashavatar (22)

Television coverage
- Network: Sony Marathi

The 10th Filmfare Awards Marathi is a ceremony presented by Filmfare that will honors the best Indian Marathi-language films of 2025.

The nominations were announced by Amruta Khanvilkar at a press conference held in Mumbai on 18 July 2026. Dashavatar led the nominations with 22, followed by Ata Thambaycha Naay! and Gondhal with 19 each, April May 99 with 17 and Sthal - A Match with 16 nominations.

At the awards ceremony, Ata Thambaycha Naay! emerged as the most-awarded film, securing 8 awards, Best Film and Best Director. It was followed by Gondhal with 6 awards, while Dashavatar and Sthal - A Match won 5 awards each.

Jayant Digambar Somalkar received the most individual nominations with six for Sthal – A Match, winning the Critics Award for Best Film and Best Story. Rohan Mapuskar (April May 99) and Santosh Davakhar (Gondhal) followed with five nominations each, while Subodh Khanolkar (Dashavatar), Shivraj Waichal (Ata Thambaycha Naay!), and Kshitij Patwardhan received four nominations each. Among them, Mapuskar, Davakhar, and Khanolkar won one award each, while Waichal emerged as the most-awarded individual of the ceremony with two awards. AV Prafullachandra earned three nominations across two films.

Among performers, Renuka Shahane received nominations for two different films (Devmanus and Uttar). Kshitee Jog was nominated for both Best Supporting Actress and Best Costume Design. Sajiri Joshi was nominated for Best Actress and Best Female Debut while Bhushaan Manoj, Taranath Khiratkar, Ishita Deshmukh and Nandini Chikte was nominated in both the Critics' acting categories and the debut categories. Joshi and Deshmukh won the Best Female Debut award, while Manoj and Khiratkar shared the Best Actor Critics award. Chikte won the Best Actress Critics award.

== Ceremony ==
The ceremony is scheduled to be held on 6 August 2026 at Sahara Star, Mumbai. The event was hosted by actors Amey Wagh and Siddharth Chandekar.

== Winners and nominees ==
Best Film	Best Director
Ata Thambaycha Naay!; April May 99; Dashavatar; Fussclass Dabhade; Jarann; Sthal - A Match	Shivraj Waichal – Ata Thambaycha Naay!; Hemant Dhome – Fussclass Dabhade; Jayant Digambar Somalkar – Sthal - A Match; Rohan Mapuskar – April May 99; Rushikesh Gupte – Jarann; Subodh Khanolkar – Dashavatar
Best Actor	Best Actress
Dilip Prabhavalkar – Dashavatar; Amey Wagh – Fussclass Dabhade; Siddharth Chandekar – Fussclass Dabhade; Bharat Jadhav – Ata Thambaycha Naay!; Lalit Prabhakar – Aarpar; Mahesh Manjrekar – Devmanus	Amruta Subhash – Jarann; Hruta Durgule – Aarpar; Renuka Shahane – Devmanus; Sai Tamhankar – Gulkand; Sajiri Joshi – April May 99
Best Supporting Actor	Best Supporting Actress
Siddharth Jadhav – Ata Thambaycha Naay!; Anuj Prabhu – Gondhal; Kishor Kadam – Gondhal; Samir Choughule – Gulkand; Siddharth Menon – Dashavatar; Suraaj Suman – Sabar Bonda	Anita Date-Kelkar – Jarann; Jayshri Jagtap – Sabar Bonda; Kiran Khoje – Ata Thambaycha Naay!; Prajakta Hanamghar – Ata Thambaycha Naay!; Kshitee Jog – Fussclass Dabhade; Priyadarshini Indalkar – Dashavatar
Best Music Director	Best Lyricist
Gulraj Singh, Saurabh Bhalerao – Ata Thambaycha Naay!; AV Prafullachandra – Dashavatar; Amitraj – Fussclass Dabhade; Gulraj Singh – Aarpar; Ilaiyaraaja – Gondhal; Rohan-Rohan – April May 99	Manoj Yadav – "Title Track" – Ata Thambaycha Naay!; Guru Thakur – "Rangpooja" – Dashavatar; Jayant Somalkar – "Pahune Yet Aahe Pori" – Sthal - A Match; Jitendra Joshi – "Title Track" – Aarpar; Kshitij Patwardhan – "Asen Mi" – Uttar; Kshitij Patwardhan – "Dis Sarale" – Fussclass Dabhade
Best Playback Singer – Male	Best Playback Singer – Female
Ajay Gogavale – "Title Track" – Ata Thambaycha Naay!; Ajay Gogavale – "Rangpooja" – Dashavatar; Abhijeet Kosambi – "Malhari" – Gondhal; Harshavardhan Wavare – "Dis Sarale" – Fussclass Dabhade; Sahil Kulkarni – "Rutuchakra" – Dashavatar; Sonu Nigam – "Mann Jaie" – April May 99	Nihira Joshi-Deshpande – "Chal Re Mana Jaau" – Ata Thambaycha Naay!; Aanandi Joshi – "Title Track" – Ata Thambaycha Naay!; Aanandi Joshi – "Dis Sarale" – Fussclass Dabhade; Aarya Ambekar – "Chandana" – Gondhal; Ronkini Gupta – "Asen Mi" – Uttar; Radhika Bhide – "Ho Aai" – Uttar; Swanandi Sardesai – "Rutuchakra" – Dashavatar
Best Child Actor	Best Debut Director
Krish More – Khalid Ke Shivaji	Subodh Khanolkar – Dashavatar; Rohan Mapuskar – April May 99; Jayant Digambar Somalkar – Sthal - A Match; Gaurav Patki – Aarpar; Rohan Parashuram Kanawade – Sabar Bonda; Santosh Davakhar – Gondhal; Shivraj Waichal – Ata Thambaycha Naay!
Best Actor Debut	Best Female Debut
Kunal Shukla – Teen Paayancha Ghoda; Nishad Bhoir – Gondhal; Avinash Londhe – Teen Paayancha Ghoda; Bhushaan Manoj – Sabar Bonda; Deepak Joil – Bhera; Taranath Khiratkar – Sthal - A Match	Sajiri Joshi – April May 99; Ishita Deshmukh – Gondhal; Janhavi Sawant – Aarpar; Nandini Chikte – Sthal - A Match; Ria Nalavade – Teen Paayancha Ghoda

Critics' awards

Best Film
Rohan Parashuram Kanawade – Sabar Bonda; Jayant Digambar Somalkar – Sthal - A Match; Tejas Prabha Vijay Deoskar – Devmanus; Santosh Davakhar – Gondhal; Noopur Bora – Teen Paayancha Ghoda; Kshitij Patwardhan – Uttar
Best Actor	Best Actress
Taranath Khiratkar – Sthal - A Match; Bhushaan Manoj – Sabar Bonda; Aaryan Menghji – April May 99; Abhinay Berde – Uttar; Prasad Oak – Gulkand; Siddharth Bodke – Punha Shivajiraje Bhosale	Nandini Chikte – Sthal - A Match; Ishita Deshmukh – Gondhal; Renuka Shahane – Uttar; Rinku Rajguru – Asha

Technical Awards

Best Story	Best Screenplay
Jayant Digambar Somalkar – Sthal - A Match; Dharam Valia – Ata Thambaycha Naay!; Kshitij Patwardhan – Uttar; Rohan Mapuskar – April May 99; Rohan Parashuram Kanawade – Sabar Bonda; Rushikesh Gupte – Jarann; Santosh Davakhar – Gondhal; Subodh Khanolkar – Dashavatar	Santosh Davakhar – Gondhal; Gaurav Patki – Aarpar; Jayant Digambar Somalkar – Sthal - A Match; Rohan Mapuskar, Kunal Pawar, Bimal Oberoi – April May 99; Rushikesh Gupte – Jarann; Shivraj Waichal, Omkar Gokhale, Arvind Jagtap – Ata Thambaycha Naay!; Subodh Khanolkar – Dashavatar
Best Dialogue	Best Editing
Shivraj Waichal, Omkar Gokhale, Arvind Jagtap – Ata Thambaycha Naay!; Guru Thakur – Dashavatar; Hemant Dhome – Fussclass Dabhade; Jayant Digambar Somalkar – Sthal - A Match; Rohan Mapuskar, Kunal Pawar – April May 99; Santosh Davakhar – Gondhal	Abhijit Deshpande – Sthal - A Match; Abhijit Deshpande – Jarann; Ashish Mhatre – Gondhal; Faisal Mahadik – Dashavatar; Ninad Khanolkar – April May 99; Sanjay Sankla – Ata Thambaycha Naay!
Best Choreography	Best Cinematography
Stanley D'Costa – "Takumba" – April May 99; Pooja Kale – "Aavshicho Gho" – Dashavatar; Pooja Kale – "Jai Hanuman" – Dashavatar; Sujit Kumar – "Yellow Yellow" – Fussclass Dabhade	Amlendu Choudhary – Gondhal; Apoorva Shaligram – April May 99; Devendra Golatkar – Dashavatar; Manoj Karmakar – Sthal - A Match; Milind Jog – Jarann; Sandeep G. N. Yadav – Ata Thambaycha Naay!; Vikas Urs – Sabar Bonda
Best Production Design	Best Sound Design
Sanjeev Rane – Dashavatar; Amit Waghchaure – Aarpar; Mahesh Kore – Jarann; Nikhil Kowale, Apoorva Bhagat – April May 99; Sandeep Meher – Gondhal; Vikram Singh – Sthal - A Match	Jayesh Dhakan – Gondhal; Mandar Kamlapurkar – Jarann; Pradyumna Chaware – Ata Thambaycha Naay!; Sanjay Chaturvedi – Sthal - A Match; Shishir Chousalkar, Akshay Vaidya – April May 99; Shishir Chousalkar, Akshay Vaidya – Dashavatar
Best Background Score	Best Costume Design
Ilaiyaraaja – Gondhal; AV Prafullachandra – Dashavatar; AV Prafullachandra – Jarann; Jerry Silvester Vincent – April May 99; Saurabh Bhalerao – Ata Thambaycha Naay!	Sachin Lovalekar – Dashavatar; Devika Kale-Chaudhary – Jarann; Kshitee Jog – Fussclass Dabhade; Sachin Lovalekar – Gondhal; Sneha Nikam – Aarpar
Best Makeup
Rohit Mahadik – Dashavatar

Special awards

Lifetime Achievement Award
- Rajdutt

== Superlatives ==
Multiple nominations
Nominations	Film
22	Dashavatar
19	Ata Thambaycha Naay!
19	Gondhal
17	April May 99
16	Sthal - A Match
12	Jarann
12	Fussclass Dabhade
9	Aarpar
8	Sabar Bonda
7	Uttar
4	Teen Paayancha Ghoda
3	Devmanus
3	Gulkand

Multiple wins
Awards	Film
8	Ata Thambaycha Naay!
6	Gondhal
5	Dashavatar
5	Sthal - A Match
3	April May 99
2	Jarann
2	Sabar Bonda

== See also ==
- List of Marathi films of 2025
