= Filmfare Award for Best Female Debut – Marathi =

Indian award for Marathi language films

Filmfare Marathi Awards for Best Female Debut
- Awarded for: Best Debut Performance by an Actress
- Country: India
- Presented by: Filmfare
- First award: Parna Pethe, Rama Madhav (2014)
- Website: Filmfare winners

The Filmfare Award for Best Female Debut is given by Filmfare as part of its annual Filmfare Awards for Marathi Cinema to recognise a performance by a female actor in a debut role. Each individual entry shows the title followed by the production company and the producer.

== Winners and nominees ==
=== 2010s ===
Year	Photos of winners	Actor	Role(s)	Film	Ref.
2014		Parna Pethe	Ramabai Peshwa	Rama Madhav	
2014		Aditi Pohankar	Nandini	Lai Bhaari	
2014		Rajeshwari Kharat	Shalu	Fandry	
2015		Anjali Patil	Maami	The Silence	
2015		Manasi Moghe	Shubhangi	Bugadi Mazi Sandli Ga	
2015		Surabhi Hande	Shubhangi	Aga Bai Arechyaa 2	
2015		Kashmira Kulkarni	Kusum	Carry On Maratha	
2016		Rinku Rajguru	Archana (Archie) Patil	Sairat	
2016		Anjana Sukhani	Janhavi	Laal Ishq	
2016		Priyanka Bose	Aai	Half Ticket	
2017		Mithila Palkar	Indu	Muramba	
2017		Aarya Ambekar	Tanvi	Ti Saddhya Kay Karte	
2017		Pritam Kagne	Halim	Halal	

=== 2020s ===
Year	Photos of winners	Actor	Role(s)	Film	Ref.
2020		Shivani Surve	Meera	Triple Seat	
2020		Bhagyashree Milind	Anandi Gopal Joshi	Anandi Gopal	
2021		Resham Shrivardhan	Nicky	June	
2021		No Other Nominee			
2022		Hruta Durgule	Ananya	Ananya	
2022		Gauri Ingawale	Laxmi	Panghrun	
2022		Jiya Shankar	Nisha Katkar	Ved	
2022		Tejasswi Prakash	Shruti Sarnaik	Mann Kasturi Re	
2023		Priyadarshini Indalkar	Phulrani	Phulrani	
2023		No Other Nominee			
2024		Jui Bhagwat	Khushi	Like Aani Subscribe	
2024		No Other Nominee			
2025		Sajiri Joshi	Jaie Khedekar	April May 99	
2025		Ishita Deshmukh	Suman	Gondhal	
2025		Janhavi Sawant	Gauri	Aarpar	
2025		Nandini Chikte	Savita	Sthal - A Match	
2025		Ria Nalavade	Chandrika	Teen Paayancha Ghoda	
