= Gondhal =

2025 Indian Marathi-language thriller film

- Theatrical release poster
- Directed by: Santosh Davakhar
- Written by: Santosh Davakhar
- Produced by: Santosh Davakhar; Diksha Davakhar
- Starring: Kishor Kadam; Ishita Deshmukh; Yogesh Sohoni; Nishad Bhoir; Anuj Prabhu
- Cinematography: Amalendu Chaudhary
- Edited by: Ashish Mhatre
- Music by: Ilaiyaraaja
- Production company: Davakhar Films
- Distributed by: AA Films; Custard Apple Pictures (India); Hombale Films (Overseas)
- Release date: 14 November 2025
- Running time: 120 minutes
- Country: India
- Language: Marathi

Gondhal is a 2025 Indian Marathi-language psychological thriller film written, directed and produced by Santosh Davakhar in his feature directorial debut. Produced under the banner of Davakhar Films with Diksha Davakhar as co-producer, the film stars Ishita Deshmukh, Yogesh Sohoni, Kishor Kadam, Suresh Vishwakarma, Nishad Bhoir, Anuj Prabhu, Vitthal Kale in main roles. Set in rural Maharashtra over the course of a single night, the story unfolds during a Gondhal, a traditional night-long devotional ritual performed for a newly married couple, and follows a young bride whose schemes turn the sacred ceremony into a night of betrayal and violence.

The film is noted for its opening sequence, a continuous take of approximately 25 minutes that has been reported as the first of its length in Indian cinema. The score and soundtrack were composed by Ilaiyaraaja.

Gondhal premiered in competition at the 56th International Film Festival of India in Goa, where Davakhar won the Silver Peacock for Best Director, the first time a Marathi film achieved the distinction. The film was theatrically released in India on 14 November 2025 but was a commercial failure, despite later winning awards at several festivals and ceremonies, including six Filmfare Awards Marathi. On 18 September 2026, the Film Federation of India selected it from 33 films as the Indian official entry for the Best International Feature Film at the 99th Academy Awards, making it the fourth Marathi film to be chosen, after Shwaas, Harishchandrachi Factory and Court.

== Plot ==
Bhivaba, a respected and financially well-off Gondhali, sets out to perform a Gondhal (Traditional devotional ritual) at the house of a Patil family. He is accompanied by his grandson, Vishnu, and his fellow performers. As they walk through the dark village night with a lantern, they discuss the disappearance of Bhivaba’s son, which is being investigated by the police. The disappearance is connected to Sarjerao, a member of another branch of the Patil family, and his father, Abasaheb, the elder Patil. The father and son use fear and violence to maintain their control over the village and display their power.

At the Patil house where Bhivaba is going to perform, Suman has recently married Ananda. Sarjerao is deeply in love with Suman, while Suman seems attracted to him because she dreams of becoming a Patlinbai. Although she is married to Ananda, she continues to respond to Sarjerao’s feelings. During the Gondhal ceremony, Sahebrao, the man Suman truly loves, arrives in the village disguised as a Murali to perform in the same Gondhal. His presence creates a complicated relationship between Suman, Sarjerao, and Ananda. Suman wishes to leave Ananda and begin a new life with Sahebrao. To achieve this, Suman takes advantage of Sarjerao’s love and jealousy and convinces him to murder Ananda.

She plans for Sarjerao to be blamed for the crime and sent to prison, after which she intends to escape with Sahebrao. As the Gondhal continues through the night, the hidden relationships and the murder plan lead to a series of violent events. As planned by Suman, Sahebrao halts a Gondhal ritual and directs Ananda to a river nearby telling him that it is the deity's calling to perform a new ritual on the bank of the river. Everyone present there believes Sahebrao should perform the ritual as it is a Gondhali suggesting the new ritual. In the meantime, Sarjerao kills his Aabasaheb in the backyard for always being against his and Suman's union and wears his father's turban implying that he has taken over the reign as the next Patil. However, Bhivaba attacks him from behind mistaking him to be the Patil and ends up killing Sarjerao. Unable to find Sarjerao to send at the river bank to kill Ananda, Suman now passes on the responsibility to Sahebrao to go and kill him for the sake of their love.

A hesitant Sahebrao goes to the river bank and calls out for him, where he is attacked by Ananda, leading to a gruesome fight in the water. It is later that Ananda had learnt about the conspiracy against him and it was him who attacked Sahebrao which ended in Sahebrao's death. The film ends with Ananda surviving the night, while Sahebrao and Sarjerao are dead. The Gondhal ceremony concludes at dawn, contrasting with the violence, betrayal, and power struggles that have taken place during the night.

== Cast ==
- Kishor Kadam as Bhivaba
- Ishita Deshmukh as Suman
- Yogesh Sohoni as Ananda (Aandya)
- Nishad Bhoir as Sarjerao
- Anuj Prabhu as Sahebrao (Murali)
- Suresh Vishwakarma as Patil, Sarjerao's father
- Madhavi Juvekar as Ananda's mother
- Aishwarya Shinde as Ananda's sister
- Kailash Waghmare as Mhorkya
- Poonam Patil as Suman's mother
- Prashant Deshpande as Ananda's father
- Sharad Jadhav as Suman's father
- Vitthal Kale as Mohan
- Pravin Dalimbkar as Vilas
- Dhruv Thoke as Vishnu, Bhivaba's grandson
- Prabhakar Mathapati as Ananda's brother-in-law

== Production ==
=== Development ===
Davakhar previously made short films, including the caste-themed Adnyat (2017), which was screened at the Cannes Short Film Corner, and the pandemic drama Antar-19 (2020). He has said that his time at Cannes, where he watched more than 40 films in 15 days, made him reflect on how Indian cinema is perceived abroad, and that he wanted to move away from the international expectation that award-worthy Indian films must deal with poverty or caste. In 2018 he attended a 45-day screenwriting course conducted by the Film and Television Institute of India in Mumbai, and studied international films such as Roma, Birdman and 1917 before writing Gondhal.

The story of Gondhal was inspired by a ritual that Davakhar experienced during his childhood with his grandfather. He has described his aim as presenting a thriller mystery in an accessible way while also conveying the richness of Maharashtra's rituals, and said that he wanted to explore the human side of folk traditions rather than treating them as mere cultural decoration.

=== Casting ===
To prepare for the role of Sahebrao, Anuj Prabhu took part in a workshop with traditional Gondhal performers, an experience he said changed his understanding of the ritual as an act of faith and responsibility rather than mere performance.

=== Filming ===
The film opens with a single uninterrupted long take that travels from the woods at night, past the village festivities and into Suman's room, introducing the principal characters and the geography of the village along the way. The sequence was rehearsed for seven days by the entire team. According to Davakhar, the take was completed over seven nights of shooting and required more than 300 junior artists each day, a lighting setup stretching over three-quarters of a kilometre, five generators and three tankers of petrol.

The film also contains a second long take of about 13 minutes. Prabhu later recalled that during one of these extended takes he misplaced the sindoor on his forehead and lost focus, forcing the crew to restart a take that had already run for 11 to 12 minutes.

== Music ==
Gondhal

Soundtrack album by Ilaiyaraaja
- Released: 2025
- Genre: Feature film soundtrack
- Length: 13:12
- Language: Marathi
- Label: Davakhar Films

The film's songs and background score were composed by Ilaiyaraaja.

Track listing
No.	Title	Lyrics	Singer(s)	Length
1.	"Chandana"	Ajay Gogavale	Ajay Gogavale, Arya Ambekar	5:08
2.	"Malhari"	Santosh Davakhar	Abhijeet Kosambi	2:22
3.	"Chandana Female Version"	Ajay Gogavale	Arya Ambekar	3.54
4.	"Naman"	Santosh Davakhar	Harilal Ghuge	1.48
Total length:				13:12

== Themes ==
The title carries a double meaning: besides the ritual, gondhal is also a Marathi word for confusion or chaos, which critics noted as a hidden layer of the screenplay. A review in Scroll.in observed that the film's finale functions as a statement on how religious belief can shackle people, particularly women, while claiming to offer them spiritual release. Vague Visages described the film as drawing on folk performance, oral tradition and melodrama only to subvert them from within. In a more critical reading, The Hollywood Reporter India argued that the Gondhal performance is quickly pushed into the background, leaving patriarchy and class dynamics in the foreground, and remarked that "cultural heritage is not a prop."

== Release ==
=== Theatrical ===
The teaser for Gondhal was released on 10 October 2025 and screened alongside Kantara: Chapter 1 in selected cinemas. The film premiered in the international competition section of the 56th International Film Festival of India in Goa in November 2025. It was released theatrically in India on 14 November 2025. The film was also screened at the India Habitat Centre's Habitat Film Festival in May 2026.

=== Re-release and international distribution ===
Following its selection as India's Oscar entry, the makers announced paid preview screenings from 9 October 2026, beginning at four theatres each in Mumbai and Pune before expanding to Delhi, Chennai, Hyderabad and Bengaluru. The previews were held in Marathi and Hindi, ahead of a wider release in Marathi, Hindi, Tamil, Telugu, Malayalam and Kannada in India and overseas. Davakhar described the previews as a chance to return the film to the big screen, saying its atmosphere and sound were meant to be experienced collectively in a theatre.

In October 2026, Hombale Films announced that it would handle the film's overseas theatrical distribution. The film was re-released on 13 November 2026 in Marathi, Hindi, Tamil, Telugu, Malayalam, and Kannada languages.

== Reception ==
=== Box office ===
Davakhar acknowledged that the film did not perform well commercially on its initial release, with the Oscar selection later giving it renewed attention.

=== Critical response ===
Santosh Bhingarde of Sakal awarded the film 3.5 out of 5 stars, describing it as an outstanding portrayal of our folk culture. He wrote, "Davkhar has given a new dimension to this mysterious story by combining his traditional folk art with his witty dialogues." Anupama Gunde of Pudhari rated the film 3 out of 5 stars, noting how "The film symbolically blends darkness, the breaking dawn, and the emergence of truth into bright light." Elizabrth Kerr of Screen Daily observed, "Though the narrative has its share of loose ends (one of which is disturbing for who it involves), Gondhal is immersive and enlightening, but also gleefully pulpy, and a breath of fresh air for Marathi cinema." The Times of India awarded the film 3.5 stars, remarking, "The plot could have been better etched but despite that, the film stands out for attempting something unusual - using a living folk tradition as the pulse around which its entire drama unfolds." Prathyush Parasuraman of The Hollywood Reporter India offered a critical perspective, "It is not that melodrama and realism cannot cohabit in subversive ways, but at some point, it begins to feel like characters are plucked from one genre and force fitted into another." Critic Keyur Seta highlighted the film's long shot, detailing and performances, observing, "Gondhal indirectly presents an irony of dark human intentions even while performing a sacred activity." Shweta Keshri of India Today rated it 3.5 out of 5 stars, praising its performances and unusual setting, "With strong performances and an unusual setting, it makes for an intriguing watch, even if the writing does not always keep pace with its ambition."

=== Academy Award submission ===
On 18 September 2026, the Film Federation of India announced Gondhal as the country's official submission for Best International Feature Film at the 99th Academy Awards. It was chosen from 33 submissions, 14 of them in Hindi, by a jury chaired by Kannada filmmaker P. Sheshadri, who said the decision was unanimous and that the film was the one the committee believed "would resonate with critics and global audiences." Other contenders included both Dhurandhar and Hanuman Ansh. FFI president Abhay Sinha described the film as a blend of family drama, thriller and other genres.

Davakhar called the selection an emotional moment that placed the responsibility of representing the country on the team, and said he believed audiences anywhere could connect with an honest culturally rooted story because "human emotions are not very different." For the campaign, the makers engaged Tatiana Detlofson of the Los Angeles-based publicity firm MediaPlanT, and Davakhar stated that the team also intended to submit the film for Best Picture consideration. Maharashtra Chief Minister Devendra Fadnavis honoured the film's cast and crew following the announcement. The ceremony is scheduled for 14 March 2027.

=== Response from Anurag Kashyap ===
Shortly after the announcement, filmmaker Anurag Kashyap told Variety India that India had historically selected the wrong films for the Oscars, citing The Lunchbox and All We Imagine as Light as missed opportunities, and suggested that eligibility should depend on international festival exposure or American distribution. Kashyap clarified that he had not seen Gondhal and could not comment on its merits. Davakhar responded on social media that he had personally introduced the film to Kashyap on a Bengaluru–Mumbai flight in April 2026, noted that the film had not since been publicly available in Mumbai, and asked audiences to watch it before forming a judgement.

=== Accolades ===
Accolades received by Gondhal
Awards and nominations
Award	Wins	Nominations
International Film Festival of India	1	2
Bengaluru International Film Festival	1	1
Pune International Film Festival	2	2
Zee Chitra Gaurav Puraskar	3	8
Filmfare Awards Marathi	6	19

Totals (Note: Certain award groups do not simply award one winner. They acknowledge several different recipients, have runners-up, and have third place. Since this is a specific recognition and is different from losing an award, runner-up mentions are considered wins in this award tally. For simplification and to avoid errors, each award in this list has been presumed to have had a prior nomination.)
- Wins: 13
- Nominations: 39

Gondhal premiered in competition at the 56th International Film Festival of India, where Santosh Davakhar won the Silver Peacock for Best Director, the first time a Marathi film achieved the distinction. At the 10th Filmfare Awards Marathi, the film received 19 nominations and won six, making it the second most-awarded film of the ceremony after Ata Thambaycha Naay!. It also received eight nominations at the Zee Chitra Gaurav Puraskar and six at the MaTa Sanman. In September 2026, it was selected as India's official submission for the Best International Feature Film at the 99th Academy Awards.

List of awards and nominations received by Gondhal
Award	Date of ceremony	Category	Recipient(s)	Result	Ref.
International Film Festival of India	2025	Golden Peacock	Gondhal	Nominated	
International Film Festival of India	2025	Silver Peacock for Best Director	Santosh Davakhar	Won	
Bengaluru International Film Festival	2026	FIPRESCI Award	Gondhal	Won	
Pune International Film Festival	2026	Best Director	Santosh Davakhar	Won	
Pune International Film Festival	2026	Best Cinematographer	Amalendu Chaudhary	Won	
Zee Chitra Gaurav Puraskar	2026	Best Film	Gondhal	Nominated	
Zee Chitra Gaurav Puraskar	2026	Best Director	Santosh Davakhar	Nominated	
Zee Chitra Gaurav Puraskar	2026	Best Promising Director	Santosh Davakhar	Won	
Zee Chitra Gaurav Puraskar	2026	Best Screenplay	Santosh Davakhar	Nominated	
Zee Chitra Gaurav Puraskar	2026	Best Cinematography	Amalendu Chaudhary	Won	
Zee Chitra Gaurav Puraskar	2026	Best Art Director	Sandeep Meher	Won	
Zee Chitra Gaurav Puraskar	2026	Best Costume Design	Sachin Lovalekar	Nominated	
Zee Chitra Gaurav Puraskar	2026	Best Makeup	Shrikant Desai	Nominated	
Filmfare Awards Marathi	2026	Best Film Critics	Santosh Davakhar	Nominated	
Filmfare Awards Marathi	2026	Best Debut Director	Santosh Davakhar	Nominated	
Filmfare Awards Marathi	2026	Best Story	Santosh Davakhar	Nominated	
Filmfare Awards Marathi	2026	Best Screenplay	Santosh Davakhar	Won	
Filmfare Awards Marathi	2026	Best Dialogue	Santosh Davakhar	Nominated	
Filmfare Awards Marathi	2026	Best Actress (Critics)	Ishita Deshmukh	Nominated	
Filmfare Awards Marathi	2026	Best Female Debut	Ishita Deshmukh	Won	
Filmfare Awards Marathi	2026	Best Actor Debut	Nishad Bhoir	Won	
Filmfare Awards Marathi	2026	Best Supporting Actor	Anuj Prabhu	Nominated	
Filmfare Awards Marathi	2026	Best Supporting Actor	Kishor Kadam	Nominated	
Filmfare Awards Marathi	2026	Best Music Director	Ilaiyaraaja	Nominated	
Filmfare Awards Marathi	2026	Best Background Score	Ilaiyaraaja	Won	
Filmfare Awards Marathi	2026	Best Playback Singer – Male	Abhijeet Kosambi ("Malhari")	Nominated	
Filmfare Awards Marathi	2026	Best Playback Singer – Female	Aarya Ambekar ("Chandana")	Nominated	
Filmfare Awards Marathi	2026	Best Cinematographer	Amlendu Choudhary	Won	
Filmfare Awards Marathi	2026	Best Editing	Ashish Mhatre	Nominated	
Filmfare Awards Marathi	2026	Best Sound Design	Jayesh Dhakan	Won	
Filmfare Awards Marathi	2026	Best Production Design	Sandeep Meher	Nominated	
Filmfare Awards Marathi	2026	Best Costume Design	Sachin Lovalekar	Nominated	

== See also ==
- List of submissions to the 99th Academy Awards for Best International Feature Film
- List of Indian submissions for the Academy Award for Best International Feature Film
