= Filmfare Award for Best Supporting Actor – Marathi =

Indian award for Marathi language films

Filmfare Marathi Awards for Best Supporting Actor
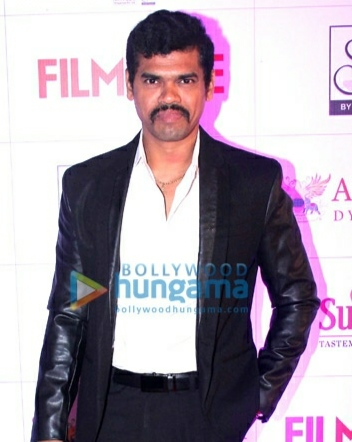
- The 2025 recipient: Siddharth Jadhav for Ata Thambaycha Naay!
- Awarded for: Best Performance by an Actor in a Supporting Role
- Country: India
- Presented by: Filmfare
- First award: Kishor Kadam, Fandry (2014)
- Website: Filmfare Awards

The Filmfare Marathi Award for Best Actor in a Supporting Role is presented annually at the Filmfare Awards to an actor via a public vote or jury; it is given by Filmfare for Marathi films. Each individual entry shows the title followed by the production company and the producer. The award was first given in 2014.

== Superlatives ==
Superlatives	Actor	Record
Actors with most awards	Kishor Kadam	2
Actors with most awards	Siddharth Jadhav	2
Actors with most nominations	Kishor Kadam	4
Actors with most nominations without ever winning	Upendra Limaye	3
Eldest winner	Vikram Gokhale (2016)	71
Youngest winner	Girish Kulkarni (2017); Siddharth Jadhav (2021)	40

== Winner and nominees ==
=== 2010s ===
Year	Photos of winners	Actor	Role(s)	Film	Ref.
2014		Kishor Kadam	Kachru Mane	Fandry	
2014		Mahesh Manjrekar	Pradeep Sharma	Rege	
2014		Pushkar Shrotri	Sachin Vaze	Rege	
2014		Upendra Limaye	Pratap Sardeshmukh	Yellow	
2014		Sharad Kelkar	Sangram Singh	Lai Bhaari	
2015		Kishor Kadam	Laxman	Partu	
2015		Chinmay Mandlekar	Makarand	Lokmanya: Ek Yugpurush	
2015		Makarand Deshpande	Daddy	Dagadi Chawl	
2015		Mohan Joshi	Swami Samarth	Deool Band	
2015		Pradeep Joshi	Judge Sadavarte	Court	
2015		Vidyadhar Joshi	Amit's father	Double Seat	
2016		Vikram Gokhale	Rambhau	Natsamrat	
2016		Ashutosh Gowariker	Raja Kamerkar	Ventilator	
2016		Jitendra Joshi	Bharatrao Zende	Poshter Girl	
2016		Aniket Vishwasrao	Bajrang Dudhbhate	Poshter Girl	
2016		Kishor Kadam	Kishore	Chaurya	
2016		Tanaji Galgunde	Langdya	Sairat	
2017		Girish Kulkarni	Appa	Faster Fene	
2017		Aniket Vishwasrao	Pandurang	Baghtos Kay Mujra Kar	
2017		Chinmay Mandlekar	Maulana	Halal	
2017		Upendra Limaye	PSI Thakur	Shentimental	
2017		Rohit Phalke	Jaideep	Manjha	
2017		Manoj Joshi	Keshav Bhat	Dashakriya	

=== 2020s ===
Year	Photos of winners	Actor	Role(s)	Film	Ref.
2020		Shashank Shende	Guruji Deshmukh	Kaagar	
2020		Sanjay Narvekar	Jagannath (Anna)	Ye Re Ye Re Paisa 2	
2020		Chittaranjan Giri	Maulana	Baba	
2020		Upendra Limaye	Anna	Sur Sapata	
2020		Mangesh Desai	IAS Officer Agnivesh Satam	Judgement	
2021		Siddharth Jadhav	Hanumantha Ubhe	Dhurala	
2021		Amey Wagh	Om Karkhanis	Karkhanisanchi Waari	
2021		Kushal Badrike	Mahadu Havaldar	Pandu	
2021		Arun Dravid	Guruji	The Disciple	
2021		Hemant Dhome	Amarjit Patil	Choricha Mamla	
2021		Mangesh Kadam	Babli's father	Darling	
2021		Shripad Joshi	Bangi	Bhonga	
2022		Nandu Madhav	Dr. Purshottam	Y	
2022		Gashmeer Mahajani	Sambhaji Maharaj	Sarsenapati Hambirrao	
2022		Ashok Saraf	Dinkar Jadhav	Ved	
2022		Priyadarshan Jadhav	Keshav	Godavari	
2022		Rohit Phalke	Madhav	Panghrun	
2022		Ajay Purkar	Baji Prabhu Deshpande	Pawankhind	
2023		Jitendra Joshi	Ajinath	Naal 2	
2023		Vitthal Kale	Sagar	Baaplyok	
2023		Pravin Dalimbkar	Gura	Ghar Banduk Biryani	
2023		Sayaji Shinde	Pallam	Ghar Banduk Biryani	
2023		Sandeep Pathak	Bhaurao	Shyamchi Aai	
2023		Subodh Bhave	Dr. Anshuman	Vaalvi	
2024		Kshitish Date	Eknath Shinde	Dharmaveer 2	
2024		Ashok Saraf	Ticket Collector (TC)	Navra Maza Navsacha 2	
2024		Harish Dudhade	Ranga	Navra Maza Navsacha 2	
2024		Atul Parchure	Doctor	Alibaba Aani Chalishitale Chor	
2024		Dilip Prabhavalkar	Anant Khot (Bhau)	Panchak	
2024		Milind Shinde	Raghunath	Ghaath	
2024		Siddharth Bodke	Rishikesh	Sridevi Prasanna	
2025		Siddharth Jadhav	Maruti Kadam	Ata Thambaycha Naay!	
2025		Kishor Kadam	Bhivaba	Gondhal	
2025		Anuj Prabhu	Sahebrao	Gondhal	
2025		Samir Choughule	Makarand Dhawale	Gulkand	
2025		Siddharth Menon	Madhavi Mestri	Dashavatar	
2025		Suraaj Suman	Balya	Sabar Bonda	
