= Jilabi (2025 film) =

2025 Marathi crime thriller film

- Promotional poster
- Marathi: जिलबी
- Directed by: Nitin Kamble
- Written by: Machhindra Bugde
- Produced by: Anand Pandit; Roopa Pandit
- Starring: Swapnil Joshi; Prasad Oak; Shivani Surve; Ganesh Yadav; Parna Pethe
- Cinematography: Ganesh Utekar
- Edited by: Sadiq Iqbal
- Music by: Amar Mohile
- Production companies: Anand Pandit Motion Pictures; Ultra Media and Entertainment
- Release date: 17 January 2025
- Country: India
- Language: Marathi

Jilabi is a 2025 Marathi-language crime thriller drama directed by Nitin Kamble and produced by Anand Pandit and Roopa Pandit under the banner of Anand Pandit Motion Pictures in collaboration with Ultra Media & Entertainment. It stars Swapnil Joshi, Prasad Oak, Shivani Surve, Ganesh Yadav and Parna Pethe in key roles.

== Premise ==
The story follows a corrupt police inspector who, while exploiting the murder case of a wealthy industrialist for personal gain, becomes entangled in unforeseen complications that spiral his life into deeper turmoil.

== Cast ==
- Swapnil Joshi as ACP Vijay Karmarkar
- Prasad Oak in a double role as
  - Saurav Subhedar
  - Gaurav Subhedar
- Shivani Surve as Janhvi
- Ganesh Yadav as Patil
- Parna Pethe as Rubina
- Pranav Raorane as Pappu
- Rushi Deshpande as DCP Karmarkar
- Rajesh Kamble
- Pankaj Khamkar as Inspector More
- Dilip Karad
- Abhijit Dulgach as Ashutosh
- Ashwini Chavare as Neha
- Harsh Danve
- Priyanka Bhattacharjee as Mishti
- Ruhi Aalve
- Aditya Bhalerao

== Production ==
Filming began in the first week of September 2023. This movie marks a rare change for Swapnil Joshi, as he takes on a role that breaks away from his signature "chocolate boy" image.

== Marketing ==
The official teaser of Jilabi was released on 18 December 2024. The two minute long trailer was released on 6 January 2025.

== Release ==
=== Theatrical ===
The film was released in theatres on 17 January 2025.

=== Home media ===
The film is digitally streaming on Ultra Jhakaas app in Marathi language. It is also available in Hindi dubbed version currently streaming on Ultra Play app.

== Reception ==
Jilabi received varied reviews from critics, with appreciation for the performances of Swapnil Joshi and Prasad Oak but mixed opinions on its narrative and execution. Santosh Bhigarde of Sakal praised the film's attempt to blend humor with emotional depth, highlighting the chemistry between the lead actors, though he noted that the screenplay could have been more engaging. Kalpesh Kubal, writing for Maharashtra Times, described the film as a "light-hearted entertainer" with strong comedic moments but criticized its predictable plot and lack of innovation.

=== Accolades ===
==== Nominations ====
- Lokshahi Marathi Chitra Sanman: Best Villain – Shivani Surve
