= Operation London Cafe =

Indian action drama film

- Poster of Kannada version
- Directed by: Sadagara Raghavendra
- Produced by: Vijay Kumar Shetty Havara; Deepak Pandurang Rane; Ramesh Kotari; Vijay Prakash
- Starring: Kaveesh Shetty; Megha Shetty; Shivani Surve; Virat Madake
- Cinematography: R. D. Nagarjun
- Edited by: K. M. Prakash
- Music by: Pranshu Jha
- Production companies: Indian Film Factory; Deepak Rane Films
- Release dates: 28 November 2025 (Kannada); 6 February 2026 (Marathi)
- Running time: 126 minutes (Kannada); 128 minutes (Marathi)
- Country: India
- Languages: Kannada; Marathi

Operation London Cafe (OLC) is a 2025 Indian action drama film directed by Sadagara Raghavendra. The film stars Kaveesh Shetty, Megha Shetty, Shivani Surve, Virat Madake in the leading roles. The film was simultaneously shot in Kannada and Marathi with the latter version titled as After Operation London Cafe. The Kannada version was released in 2025 and the Marathi version was released in 2026.

== Cast ==
- Kaveesh Shetty as Shaura Satyadev/Keshav
- Megha Shetty as Bhavya
- Shivani Surve
- Virat Madake
- Ashwini Chavare
- Shalaka Pawar
- Arjun Kapikad
- B. Suresha
- Krishna Hebbale
- Arun Sovi

== Release ==
The film was theatrically released on 6 February 2026.

== Reception ==
Yeman S of The Times of India gave 3/5 stars and wrote "Despite its uneven pacing and a dragged-out second half, Operation London Cafe has strong ideas, striking visuals, and compelling performances - making it a film that's definitely worth watching once."

A Sharadhaa of Cinema Express gave 2.5/5 stars and writes "After Operation London Cafe is rich in ideas but uneven in how it chases them. It is ambitious in thought and cautious in execution. It sparks debate and questions and leaves you with the sense that the film’s most compelling chapter is perhaps the one still waiting to be told."

Y Maheswara Reddy of Bangalore Mirror wrote "Though the movie is set against Naxalism, it does not glorify it. The director has tried to convey a message to society, especially misguided youths on how naxals indulge in violence and kill people ruthlessly."
