= Ata Thambaycha Naay! =

2025 Indian Marathi-language film

- Theatrical release poster
- Directed by: Shivraj Waichal
- Written by: Shivraj Waichal; Omkar Gokhale; Arvind Jagtap
- Produced by: Tushar Hiranandani; Dharam Walia
- Starring: Bharat Jadhav; Siddhartha Jadhav; Om Bhutkar; Ashutosh Gowariker; Prajakta Hanamghar; Kiran Khoje; Parna Pethe
- Cinematography: Sandeep Gn Yadav
- Edited by: Sanjay Sankla
- Music by: Gulraj Singh
- Production companies: Chalk and Cheese Films; Film Jazz; Zee Studios
- Distributed by: Zee Studios
- Release date: 1 May 2025
- Running time: 144 minutes
- Country: India
- Language: Marathi
- Box office: ₹8 crore

Ata Thambaycha Naay! (transl. Now, there’s no stopping!) is a 2025 Indian Marathi-language drama film co-written and directed by Shivraj Waichal, and produced by Chalk and Cheese Films, Film Jazz, and Zee Studios. The film stars an ensemble cast including Bharat Jadhav, Siddhartha Jadhav, Ashutosh Gowarikar, Prajakta Hanamghar, Kiran Khoje, Parna Pethe, Om Bhutkar and Rohini Hattangadi. Based on a true incident, the story highlights the dedication and lives of employees of the Mumbai Municipal Corporation. The story has been inspired by an incident that took place in BMC in 2016 where 23 Class IV workers passed the 10th standard board exam that year.

The film was officially announced in December 2024 and was theatrically released on 1 May 2025, coincide with Maharashtra Day.

== Plot ==
A group of municipal workers in Mumbai, most of them sanitation staff, never have had the chance to finish their education. With encouragement from Assistant Municipal Commissioner Udaykumar Shirurkar, they decide to go back to school and attempt the 10th standard exam.

At first, they struggle to balance hard physical jobs during the day and studies at night. Some get discouraged, some fall sick, and others think of giving up. Their night-school teacher Nilesh motivates them to continue, reminding them of the dignity and confidence education can bring.

Slowly, the group learns to support each other. Despite many challenges, they regain faith in themselves and prepare for the exam, showing that it is never too late to learn.

== Cast ==
- Bharat Jadhav as Sakharam Manchekar
- Siddhartha Jadhav as Maruti Kadam
- Ashutosh Gowarikar as Udaykumar Shiroorkar
- Prajakta Hanamghar as Jayashree Kamble
- Kiran Khoje as Apsara Jadhav
- Rohini Hattangadi as Udaykumar's Mother
- Parna Pethe as Seema Mali
- Om Bhutkar as Nilesh Mali
- Pravin Dalimbkar as Pravin Sawant
- Rupa Borgaonkar
- Deepak Shirke as Dattabhau
- Shrikant Yadav as Mr. Kamble

== Production ==
In mid-December, the film was officially launched at an event attended by Mumbai Municipal Commissioner Bhushan Gagrani, Deputy Commissioner Kiran Dighavkar, Zee Studios executives Umesh K. Bansal and Bavesh Janwalekar, producers Nidhi Parmar Hiranandani and Dharam Walia, retired Municipal Officer Udaykumar Shirurkar, and members of the cast, who were also present at the launch.

The story is inspired by the real-life journey of Udaykumar Shirurkar, a retired Assistant Municipal Commissioner (AMC), who motivated 23 Class IV workers of the BMC to complete their basic school education.

The actors Bharat Jadhav and Siddhartha Jadhav, who have previously worked together in several films, are reuniting on screen after many years.

== Soundtrack ==
Track listing
No.	Title	Lyrics	Music	Singer(s)	Length
1.	"Ata Thambaycha Naay - Title Track"	Manoj Yadav	Gulraj Singh	Ajay Gogavale, Aanandi Joshi	3:25
2.	"Chal Re Mana Jaau"	Manoj Yadav	Gulraj Singh	Nihira Joshi Deshpande; Gulraj Singh	2:44
3.	"Saang Saang Bholanath"	Manoj Yadav	Gulraj Singh	Avadhoot Gupte, Shivraj Waichal, Swarmegha Students	2:40
4.	"Garva Tu"	Manoj Yadav	Saurabh Bhalerao	Jasraj Joshi, Mukta Joshi	2:38

== Marketing and release ==
The title motion poster was unveiled on 1 February 2025, featuring the film's title painted in three bold colors on a wall along a busy road. The first look of the film was revealed in the form of a pre-teaser on the occasion of Chhatrapati Shivaji Maharaj Jayanti, prior to which it was launched at the 25th Zee Chitra Gaurav Purashkar ceremony. In the teaser, people are seen joyfully running in one direction, holding leaves in their hands, suggesting a symbolic or significant moment in the film. On Women's Day 2025, a special teaser was released, depicting a woman entangled in responsibilities—someone who puts her family first, finds her identity across fields, and symbolizes non-violence and inspiration. On the occasion of Gudi Padwa, the Marathi New Year, a new poster featuring the entire ensemble cast—with joyful expressions and a sense of triumph—was unveiled during the Shobha Yatra in Dombivli.

A grand premiere was held in Mumbai on 29 April 2025, attended by numerous industry personalities including Mahesh Manjrekar, Anjali Patil, Amey Wagh, Rinku Rajguru, Ankush Chaudhari and Chhaya Kadam. The film was released in theatres on 1 May 2025, coinciding with Labour Day, which is also celebrated as Maharashtra Day.

== Reception ==
=== Critical reception ===
Mihir Bhanage of The Times of India rated it 3.5 out of 5 stars, calling it "a heartfelt story that makes you smile and leaves you teary-eyed too." He added, "On the technical side too, Ata Thambaycha Naay displays a strong case with a good screenplay, camerawork, sound, music and production design. These attributes along with the performances hold the audience’s attention throughout." Nandini Ramnath of Scroll.in wrote, "The 144-minute film isn’t preachy, but it does get a little carried away with its progressive messaging. Some judicious snipping could have created a punchier, more effective result." Kalpeshraj Kubal of Maharashtra Times awarded the film 3 out of 5 stars and noted, "a visual narrative that journeys from 'Vasa' to 'Suvasa' is presented in this film by the trio of writers Shivraj Waichal, Omkar Gokhale and Arvind Jagtap," while commending the direction, casting, and the film's core theme. Reshma Raikwar of Sakal wrote "The film explores the joy of watching a fictional story of superheroes and how different it is to watch a film that tells an inspiring story of a person who becomes a superhero in reality". Santosh Bhingarde of eSakal gave the film 3.5 out of 5 stars and wrote "Although the first half of the film was not very effective, the second half has become very engaging. It is a story that unfolds through emotional events. It is an emotional and positive energy".

=== Box office ===
The film earned ₹45 lakh on its opening day and ₹1.57 crore in the first week. The film collected ₹2.9 crore in nine days. After 13 days, the collection reached ₹3.77 crore and ₹5.67 crore in seventeen days.

The film earned ₹6.77 crore in 31 days, and completed its final theatrical run with ₹7.45 crore.

=== Accolades ===
Year	Award	Category	Nominee (s)	Result	Ref.
2025	Zee24Taas Marathi Sanman	Best Film	Ata Thambaycha Naay!	Won	
2025	Zee24Taas Marathi Sanman	Best Debut Film	Shivraj Waichal	Won	
2025	Zee24Taas Marathi Sanman	Best Actor	Bharat Jadhav	Won	
2025	Zee24Taas Marathi Sanman	Best Supporting Actor	Prajakta Hanamghar	Won	
2025	Lokshahi Marathi Chitra Sanman	Best Film	Ata Thambaycha Naay!	Pending	
2025	Lokshahi Marathi Chitra Sanman	Best Director	Shivraj Waichal	Pending	
2025	Lokshahi Marathi Chitra Sanman	Best Supporting Actor	Bharat Jadhav	Pending	
2025	Lokshahi Marathi Chitra Sanman	Best Supporting Actress	Prajakta Hanamghar	Pending	
2025	Lokshahi Marathi Chitra Sanman	Best Supporting Actress	Kiran Khoje	Pending	
2025	Lokshahi Marathi Chitra Sanman	Best Song	Ata Thambaycha Naay (Title Track)	Pending	
2025	Lokshahi Marathi Chitra Sanman	Best Story	Dharam Walia	Pending	
2025	Lokshahi Marathi Chitra Sanman	Best Screenplay	Shivraj Waichal, Omkar Gokhale, Arvind Jagtap	Pending	
2026	Zee Chitra Gaurav Puraskar	Best Film	Ata Thambaycha Naay!	Won	
2026	Zee Chitra Gaurav Puraskar	Best Director	Shivraj Waichal	Won	
2026	Zee Chitra Gaurav Puraskar	Best Actor	Bharat Jadhav	Won	
2026	Zee Chitra Gaurav Puraskar	Best Supporting Actor	Siddhartha Jadhav	Won	
2026	Zee Chitra Gaurav Puraskar	Best Supporting Actor	Om Bhutkar	Nominated	
2026	Zee Chitra Gaurav Puraskar	Best Supporting Actress	Prajakta Hanamghar	Nominated	
2026	Zee Chitra Gaurav Puraskar	Best Supporting Actress	Kiran Khoje	Nominated	
2026	Zee Chitra Gaurav Puraskar	Best Music	Gulraj Singh, Saurabh Bhalerao	Nominated	
2026	Zee Chitra Gaurav Puraskar	Best Background Score	Saurabh Bhalerao	Won	
2026	Zee Chitra Gaurav Puraskar	Best Lyricist	Manoj Yadav (Ata Thambaycha Naay – Title Track)	Won	
2026	Zee Chitra Gaurav Puraskar	Best Playback Singer Male	Ajay Gogavale (Ata Thambaycha Naay – Title Track)	Nominated	
2026	Zee Chitra Gaurav Puraskar	Best Playback Singer Female	Nihira Joshi (Chal Re Mana Jaau)	Nominated	
2026	Zee Chitra Gaurav Puraskar	Best Sound	Pradyumna Chaware	Nominated	
2026	Zee Chitra Gaurav Puraskar	Best Screenplay	Shivraj Waichal, Omkar Gokhale	Won	
2026	Zee Chitra Gaurav Puraskar	Best Dialogue	Shivraj Waichal, Omkar Gokhale, Arvind Jagtap	Won	
2026	Zee Chitra Gaurav Puraskar	Best Editor	Sanjay Sankla	Nominated	
2026	Zee Chitra Gaurav Puraskar	Best Costume	Sachin Lovalekar	Nominated	
2026	Zee Chitra Gaurav Puraskar	Best Makeup	Riya Maclean	Nominated	
2026	Zee Chitra Gaurav Puraskar	Best Production Design	Ankur Aserkar	Nominated	
2026	Maharashtra Times Sanman	Best Film	Ata Thambaycha Naay!	Won	
2026	Maharashtra Times Sanman	Best Director	Shivraj Waichal	Won	
2026	Maharashtra Times Sanman	Best Actor	Bharat Jadhav	Won	
2026	Maharashtra Times Sanman	Best Supporting Actor	Siddhartha Jadhav	Won	
2026	Maharashtra Times Sanman	Best Supporting Actress	Prajakta Hanamghar	Nominated	
2026	Maharashtra Times Sanman	Best Music Director	Gulraj Singh, Saurabh Bhalerao	Nominated	
2026	Maharashtra Times Sanman	Best Screenplay	Shivraj Waichal, Omkar Gokhale, Arvind Jagtap	Won	
2026	Maharashtra Times Sanman	Best Dialogue	Shivraj Waichal, Omkar Gokhale, Arvind Jagtap	Nominated	
2026	Indian National Cine Academy	Best Film	Ata Thambaycha Naay!	Nominated	
2026	Indian National Cine Academy	Best Director	Shivraj Waichal	Nominated	
2026	Indian National Cine Academy	Best Actor	Bharat Jadhav	Nominated	
2026	City Cine Awards Marathi	Best Film	Ata Thambaycha Naay!	Won	
2026	City Cine Awards Marathi	Best Director	Shivraj Waichal	Won	
2026	City Cine Awards Marathi	Best Actor	Bharat Jadhav	Nominated	
2026	City Cine Awards Marathi	Best Actor	Siddhartha Jadhav	Nominated	
2026	City Cine Awards Marathi	Best Supporting Actor – Male	Om Bhutkar	Nominated	
2026	City Cine Awards Marathi	Best Supporting Actor – Female	Prajakta Hanamghar	Won	
2026	City Cine Awards Marathi	Best Music Director	Gulraj Singh, Saurabh Bhalerao	Won	
2026	City Cine Awards Marathi	Best Singer – Male	Jasraj Joshi (Garv Tu)	Nominated	
2026	City Cine Awards Marathi	Best Singer – Female	Aanandi Joshi (Ata Thambaycha Naay – Title Track)	Nominated	
2026	City Cine Awards Marathi	Best Lyricist	Manoj Yadav (Garv Tu)	Won	
2026	City Cine Awards Marathi	Best Screenplay	Shivraj Waichal, Omkar Gokhale, Arvind Jagtap	Nominated	
2026	Filmfare Awards Marathi	Best Film	Ata Thambaycha Naay!	Won	
2026	Filmfare Awards Marathi	Best Director	Shivraj Waichal	Won	
2026	Filmfare Awards Marathi	Best Debut Director	Shivraj Waichal	Nominated	
2026	Filmfare Awards Marathi	Best Actor	Bharat Jadhav	Nominated	
2026	Filmfare Awards Marathi	Best Supporting Actor	Siddharth Jadhav	Won	
2026	Filmfare Awards Marathi	Best Supporting Actress	Kiran Khoje	Nominated	
2026	Filmfare Awards Marathi	Best Supporting Actress	Prajakta Hanamghar	Nominated	
2026	Filmfare Awards Marathi	Best Music Director	Gulraj Singh, Saurabh Bhalerao	Won	
2026	Filmfare Awards Marathi	Best Background Score	Saurabh Bhalerao	Nominated	
2026	Filmfare Awards Marathi	Best Lyricist	Manoj Yadav (Ata Thambaycha Naay – Title Track)	Won	
2026	Filmfare Awards Marathi	Best Playback Singer – Male	Ajay Gogavale (Ata Thambaycha Naay – Title Track)	Won	
2026	Filmfare Awards Marathi	Best Playback Singer – Female	Aanandi Joshi (Chal Re Mana Jaau)	Won	
2026	Filmfare Awards Marathi	Best Playback Singer – Female	Aanandi Joshi (Ata Thambaycha Naay – Title Track)	Nominated	
2026	Filmfare Awards Marathi	Best Story	Dharam Valia	Nominated	
2026	Filmfare Awards Marathi	Best Screenplay	Shivraj Waichal, Omkar Gokhale, Arvind Jagtap	Nominated	
2026	Filmfare Awards Marathi	Best Dialogue	Shivraj Waichal, Omkar Gokhale, Arvind Jagtap	Won	
2026	Filmfare Awards Marathi	Best Cinematography	Pradyumna Chawar	Nominated	
2026	Filmfare Awards Marathi	Best Editing	Sanjay Sankla	Nominated	
2026	Filmfare Awards Marathi	Best Sound Design	Pradyumna Chaware	Nominated	
