= Aga Aai Aaho Aai =

2026 Indian Marathi-language web series

- Genre: Slice of Life
- Written by: Kalyani Pandit
- Directed by: Varun Narvekar
- Starring: Hruta Durgule; Nirmiti Sawant; Renuka Shahane; Suyog Gorhe
- Country of origin: India
- No. of episodes: 6

Production
- Producers: Jyoti Deshpande; Ranjit Gugle; Anish Joag
- Production companies: Jio Studios; Bahawa Entertainment; Pratisaad Productions

Original release
- Network: ZEE5 (Marathi)
- Release: 24 July 2026

Aga Aai Aaho Aai is an Indian Marathi language family drama web series directed by Varun Narvekar and written by Kalyani Pandit. The series stars Hruta Durgule, Renuka Shahane, Nirmiti Sawant and Suyog Gorhe.

== Premise ==
Set in Pune and Kolhapur, the series focuses on a newly married woman as she adjusts to her husband's family. The core dynamic centres on her relationship with both her own mother and her mother-in-law, exploring the tensions and bonds between the three women.

== Cast ==
- Hruta Durgule as Shreya
- Renuka Shahane as Janaki
- Nirmiti Sawant as Sunita
- Suyog Gorhe as Anish

== Production ==
=== Casting ===
The lead role is played by Hruta Durgule, who takes on a dramatic character role in her first series. Renuka Shahane plays the mother-in-law and has stated that the role fulfils a long-standing personal aspiration to portray complex family dynamics. Nirmiti Sawant rounds out the central trio as the protagonist's mother.

=== Release ===
Aga Aai Aaho Aai is produced by Jio Studios, Bahawa Entertainment and Pratisaad Productions.

The series premiered on ZEE5 on 24 July 2026. The trailer was released on 20 July 2026, five days before the full series launch.
