= Satarcha Salman =

- Theatrical release poster
- Directed by: Hemant Dhome
- Written by: Hemant Dhome
- Produced by: Prakash Singhee; Suresh Pai
- Starring: Suyog Gorhe; Akshay Tanksale; Sayali Sanjeev; Shivani Surve; Makarand Deshpande
- Cinematography: Prasad Bhende
- Edited by: Faisal Mahadik; Imran Mahadik
- Music by: Amitraj
- Production company: Texas Studios
- Distributed by: Reliance Entertainment
- Release date: 3 March 2023
- Country: India
- Language: Marathi

Satarcha Salman (transl. Salman from Satara) is a 2023 Indian Marathi language drama film directed by Hemant Dhome and produced by Texas Studios. It is distributed by Reliance Entertainment, which features Suyog Gorhe, Akshay Tanksale, Sayali Sanjeev and Shivani Surve in pivotal roles. It was theatrically released on 3 March 2023.

== Plot ==
The film is based on the life of an ordinary boy living in Satara who wants to become an actor.

== Cast ==
- Suyog Gorhe as Amit Kalbhor
- Akshay Tanksale as Vicky Dhungane
- Sayali Sanjeev as Madhuri Mane
- Shivani Surve as Dipika Bhosale
- Makarand Deshpande as Arun Kalbhor
- Aniket Vishwasrao as Aniket
- Anand Ingale as Mohan
- Jitendra Joshi as Raj
- Kamlesh Sawant as Bhau
- Madhav Abhyankar as Inspector Bhosle
- Mahesh Manjrekar in a cameo appearance
- Medha Manjrekar in a cameo appearance
- Sai Tamhankar in a cameo appearance

== Production ==
Satarcha Salman is produced by Prakash Singhee under the banner of Texas Studios in association with Suresh Pai and distributed by Reliance Entertainment. The film has been shot in Kenjal village of Satara.

== Release ==
The film was set to release in 2019 but got delayed for unknown reasons and after 4 years of delay finally it was theatrically released on 3 March 2023.

== Soundtrack ==
Music is composed by Amitraj and Adarsh Shinde. Background score is by Aditya Bedekar. Along with the film, the title track was also shot in the villages of Satara.

All lyrics are written by Kshitij Patwardhan; all music is composed by Amitraj.

Track listing
No.	Title	Singer (s)	Length
1.	"Satarcha Salman (Title Track)"	Nagesh Morwekar	3:30
2.	"I Want Turmeric"	Adarsh Shinde	4:16
