= Shivani Surve =

Indian television actress (born 1993)

- Born: 29 August 1993 (age 33); Satara, Maharashtra, India
- Occupation: Actress
- Years active: 2011–present
- Spouse: Ajinkya Nanaware (m. 2024)

Shivani Surve (born 29 August 1993) is an Indian actress who works in Marathi and Hindi television and in Marathi films.

Surve first appeared on screen as a child artist and began working in television in 2011 with supporting roles in the Hindi serials Phulwa and Navya..Naye Dhadkan Naye Sawaal. She had her breakthrough the following year in the title role of the Star Pravah drama Devyani (2012–2013), which established her as a familiar face in Marathi television, and went on to lead Sundar Maza Ghar (2013–2014) and Tu Jivala Guntavave (2015) on the same channel. She returned to Hindi television as Vividha in Star Plus's Jaana Na Dil Se Door (2016–2017), her most widely seen Hindi work, and later appeared in Sony TV's Ek Deewaana Tha (2018). In 2019 she was a contestant on the second season of the reality series Bigg Boss Marathi, finishing as the third runner-up.

She made her first film appearance in the comedy Ghantaa (2016) and took her first leading role in Triple Seat (2019), winning the Filmfare Award Marathi for Best Female Debut. Her later films include the black comedy Vaalvi, the drama Satarcha Salman and the ensemble comedy Jhimma 2 (all 2023), the romantic drama Unn Sawali (2024) and the crime thriller Jilabi (2025). She returned to Marathi television as the lead of Star Pravah's Thoda Tuza Ani Thoda Maza (2024–2025).

== Early life ==
Surve was born on 29 August 1993 in Satara, Maharashtra. She spent her childhood in Dombivli, a suburb of Thane, before moving with her family to Sion during her teenage years, where she attended Sadhana Vidyalaya and completed her higher secondary education through a correspondence course at Guru Nanak Khalsa College in Matunga while pursuing acting assignments.

== Career ==
Surve began her acting career as a child, making her screen debut at the age of seven in the Bhojpuri film Ganga Mili Sagar Se. She subsequently performed in the Marathi play Mangalayacha Lena and joined the Hindi theatre group Karma Kala Manch, through which she began auditioning for television roles. She was initially cast in Agle Janam Mohe Bitiya Hi Kijo in 2009 but was replaced after two or three days of filming. In 2011, she made her television debut in a supporting role in Colors TV's Phulwa, playing the sister of the title character, followed by a character role in Star Plus's Navya..Naye Dhadkan Naye Sawaal.

In 2012, she made her Marathi television debut as the lead in Devyani, which aired on Star Pravah. The series was adapted from the Hindi television show Mann Kee Awaaz Pratigya and followed a young woman navigating life in a joint family. Although Devyani made Surve a household name in Maharashtra, she left the series in 2013 after approximately eighteen months, was replaced in the role, and later stated that she had been removed from the show rather than having resigned. She subsequently joined the Hindi supernatural drama Anamika as a lead following a change in the storyline. Later that year, she appeared alongside Swati Chitnis in ETV Marathi's Sundar Maza Ghar, which explored the relationship between a grandmother and her granddaughter. In 2015, she returned to Star Pravah with Tu Jivala Guntavave.

She made her film debut in 2016 with a role in the Marathi comedy Ghantaa. That same year, she returned to Hindi television as Vividha, the female lead in Star Plus's Jaana Na Dil Se Door, opposite Vikram Singh Chauhan. Her performance and on-screen pairing with Chauhan received attention, and she was nominated for Favourite Jodi at the Star Parivaar Awards. She also criticised the promotion and filming of certain romantic sequences in the series.

In 2018, she joined Sony TV's supernatural thriller Ek Deewaana Tha, reuniting with Vikram Singh Chauhan. The following year, she participated in the second season of Marathi reality show Bigg Boss Marathi, where she was one of the most talked-about contestants and finished as the third runner-up. She made her debut as a leading film actress in the romantic comedy Triple Seat, alongside Ankush Chaudhari and Pallavi Patil. The film, which centres on a love triangle initiated by a wrong telephone call, was a commercial failure, although Surve won the Best Female Debut award at the Filmfare Awards Marathi. Reshma Raikwar of Loksatta stated, "She has portrayed all the shades of Meera's emotions in a very beautiful way."

After a three-year absence from the screen, Surve appeared in four films released in 2023. She played a dentist involved in a murder conspiracy in Paresh Mokashi's black comedy Vaalvi, alongside Swapnil Joshi and Subodh Bhave. The film was a commercial success, earning ₹7.25 crore (equivalent to ₹7.9 crore or US$820,000 in 2026) and becoming the sixth-highest-grossing Marathi film of the year. Mayur Sanap of Rediff wrote, "As a no-nonsense, volatile lady, Shivani Surve proves that she's one to watch out for." She received several Best Actress nominations, as well as a nomination for Best Performance in a Negative Role at the Fakt Marathi Cine Sanman. She also appeared in the ensemble cast of Jhimma 2, the sequel to Hemant Dhome's 2019 film Jhimma along with Rinku Rajguru. Reviewers noted the performances of the cast, with Maharashtra Times particularly praising the acting and training of Rajguru and Surve. The film earned ₹14 crore (equivalent to ₹15 crore or US$1.6 million in 2026) worldwide, making it the third-highest-grossing Marathi film of 2023. Her other releases that year included Dhome's delayed film Satarcha Salman and the Hindi drama Unlock Zindagi.

She returned to Marathi television in June 2024, after a nine-year absence, with Thoda Tuza Ani Thoda Maza. She also appeared in the film Unn Sawali, opposite Bhushan Pradhan. She later starred alongside Swapnil Joshi in the crime thriller Jilabi, for which she received the Best Villain award at the Lokshahi Marathi Chitra Sanman. In 2026, she appeared as a female Naxalite leader in the Kannada–Marathi bilingual film Operation London Cafe, which received negative critical and commercial responses.

== Personal life ==
Surve met actor Ajinkya Nanaware on the set of the Star Pravah serial Tu Jivala Guntavave, and the two began a relationship in 2015, which they kept private for several years before publicly confirming it in February 2022. In 2023, she announced that they planned to marry the following year. The couple became engaged on 31 January 2024 and married the following day, 1 February 2024, in a private ceremony in Thane attended by close family and friends.

== Filmography ==
=== Films ===
Year	Title	Role	Language	Ref.
2002	Ganga Mile Sagar Se	Child artist	Bhojpuri	
2016	Ghantaa	Anagha	Marathi	
2019	Triple Seat	Meera (Tanvi)	Marathi	
2023	Vaalvi	Dr. Devika	Marathi	
2023	Satarcha Salman	Devika Bhosale	Marathi	
2023	Unlock Zindagi		Hindi	
2023	Jhimma 2	Manali	Marathi	
2024	Unn Sawali	Aanvi	Marathi	
2025	Jilabi	Janhvi	Marathi	
2026	Operation London Cafe		Marathi / Kannada	

=== Television ===
Year	Serial	Role	Language	Notes	Ref.
2011	Phulwa	Champa	Hindi		
2011–2012	Navya..Naye Dhadkan Naye Sawaal	Nimisha Vajpayee	Hindi		
2012–2013	Devyani	Devyani Kelkar Vikhepatil	Marathi		
2013	Anamika	Chhavi Gupta Saluja	Hindi		
2013–2014	Sundar Maza Ghar	Sai	Marathi		
2015	Tu Jeevala Guntavave	Ananya Budhwadkar	Marathi		
2016–2017	Jaana Na Dil Se Door	Vividha Kashyap Vashisht	Hindi		
2018	Ek Deewaana Tha	Shivani Bedi	Hindi		
2018	Laal Ishq	Zoya	Hindi	Episodic role	
2019	Bigg Boss Marathi 2	Contestant	Marathi	3rd Runner-Up	
2024–2025	Thoda Tuza Ani Thoda Maza	Manasi Sanas Prabhu	Marathi		

=== Voice artist ===
Year	Show	Role	Language	Ref.
2021	Humari Chhoti Bahu	Mili	Hindi	

=== Theatre ===
- Mangalayacha Lena

== Awards and nominations ==
Year	Awards	Category	Work	Result	Ref.
2013	Sanskruti Kala Darpan Awards	Best Actress	Devyani	Nominated	
2017	Star Parivaar Awards	Favourite Jodi (along with Vikram Singh Chauhan)	Jaana Na Dil Se Door	Nominated	
2019	Maharashtracha Favourite Kon?	Favourite Actress	Triple Seat	Nominated	
2019	Maharashtracha Favourite Kon?	Popular Face of the Year	—N/a	Won	
2020	City Cine Awards	Best Debutant Artist	Triple Seat	Won	
2021	Maharashtracha Favourite Kon?	Popular Face of the Year	—N/a	Nominated	
2021	Filmfare Awards Marathi	Best Female Debut	Triple Seat	Won	
2023	Fakt Marathi Cine Sanman	Best Performance in a Negative Role	Vaalvi	Nominated	
2023	TV9 Aapla Bioscope Awards	Best Actress in a Lead Role	Vaalvi	Won	
2023	TV9 Aapla Bioscope Awards	Best Jodi (along with Swapnil Joshi)	Vaalvi	Nominated	
2024	Maharashtracha Favourite Kon?	Popular Face of the Year	—N/a	Nominated	
2024	Maharashtracha Favourite Kon?	Favourite Actress	Jhimma 2	Nominated	
2024	Maharashtracha Favourite Kon?	Favourite Actress	Vaalvi	Nominated	
2024	City Cine Awards	Best Actor Female	Vaalvi	Nominated	
2024	Zee Chitra Gaurav Puraskar	Best Supporting Actress	Jhimma 2	Won	
2025	Lokshahi Marathi Chitra Sanman	Best Villain	Jilabi	Won	
