= Krutant =

2019 Indian Marathi-language film

- Theatrical release poster
- Directed by: Datta Mohan Bhandare
- Screenplay by: Datta Bhadare; Ravi Lokare
- Story by: Datta Mohan Bhandare
- Produced by: Miiheer Shah; Jitu Ranka (Jolly); Sharad Mishra
- Starring: Sandeep Kulkarni; Suyog Gorhe; Sayli Patil; Vidya Karanjikar; Vaishnavi Patwardhan
- Cinematography: Vijay Mishra
- Edited by: Prachi Rohidas
- Music by: Music: Vijay Narayan Gavande; Lyrics: Guru Thakur; Mandar Cholkar
- Production company: Rain Rose Films
- Distributed by: Pickle Entertainment
- Release date: 18 January 2019
- Running time: 126 minutes
- Country: India
- Language: Marathi

Krutant is a 2019 Indian Marathi-language Psychological thriller film directed by Datta Mohan Bhandare and produced by Miiheer Shah. The film stars Sandeep Kulkarni, Suyog Gorhe and Sayli Patil in lead roles. It was theatrically released on 18 January 2019.

== Plot ==
Samyak is a workaholic who struggles to balance his personal and professional life. However, on the insistence of his friends, he agrees to go a trip to Konkan with his friends. On the way, he meets Baba, a wise old man whose story changes his life.

== Cast ==
- Sandeep Kulkarni as Baba
- Suyog Gorhe as Samyak
- Sayli Patil as Reva
- Vidya Karanjikar as Samyak's mother
- Vaishnavi Patwardhan

== Soundtrack ==
Krutant

Soundtrack album by Vijay Gavande
- Released: 2019
- Genre: Feature film soundtrack
- Length: 13:09
- Language: Marathi
- Label: Zee Music Company

Official audio
- Krutant - Full Album on YouTube

The music is composed by Vijay Narayan Gavande.

Track listing
No.	Title	Lyrics	Singer(s)	Length
1.	"Ye Firuni Bhet Punha"	Mandar Cholkar	Priyanka Barve	5:20
2.	"Tu Aani Mi"	Mandar Cholkar	Hrishikesh Ranade; Amita Ghugari	4:34
3.	"Thamb Kinchit Thamb"	Guru Thakur	Guru Thakur; Santosh Bote	3:06
Total length:				13:09

== Reception ==
=== Critical reception ===
Fim received mixed reviews from critics. Rishab Deb of The Times of India gave 2 stars out of 5 and addressed as the average film. Tejal Gawade of Lokmat gave 2 out of 5 and wrote "Although the content of the movie is very good, the director has not been able to present it properly. The plot of the film feels disjointed at some places. The premise of the film is very boring and feels like a lecture. Philosophy aside, the film again builds suspense as the mystery begins.The attempt to make the movie exciting by giving a twist of suspense to a simple story has failed miserably." ABP Majha gave 2 stars and praised acting and addressed that the film falls a little short of being great. Mukund Kule of Maharashtra Times rated 2.5 out of 5 stars said "Overall the story is good, but the setting is a bit boring and clunky. An attempt has been made to make the movie mysterious by giving a suspenseful twist to the simple story of the movie."
