= Zee Chitra Gaurav Puraskar for Best Supporting Actress =

Award

- Awarded for: Best Performance by an Actress in a Supporting Role
- Country: India
- Presented by: Zee Marathi
- First award: Aditi Deshpande, Jogwa (2009)
- Currently held by: Ashwini Bhave, Gharat Ganpati (2025)

Zee Chitra Gaurav Puraskar for Best Supporting Actress is presented by Zee Marathi as part of its annual Zee Chitra Gaurav Puraskar, for best acting done by an actor in Marathi films, who are selected by the jury. The award was first given in 2010 for films released in 2009.

== Winners ==
Year	Actor	Roles(s)	Film	Ref.
2008	Surekha Kudachi	Zanabai	Aara Aara Aaba Aata Tari Thamba	
2009	Aditi Deshpande	Taanu	Jogwa	
2010	Jyoti Chandekar	Sitabai Gunje	Sukhant	
2011	Vrinda Gajendra	Sister-in-law	Paradh	
2012	Jyoti Chandekar	Godakka	Paulwaat	
2013	Hemangi Kavi	Nanda	Pipani	
2014	Leena Bhagwat	Kaustubh's Mother	Avatarachi Goshta	
2015	Jyoti Chandekar	Sasu	Ticha Umbartha	
2016	Mrunmayee Deshpande	Vidya	Natsamrat	
2017	Priyanka Bose	Mother	Half Ticket	
2018	Jyoti Subhash	Satya's Aaji	Chi Va Chi Sau Ka	
2019	Devika Daftardar	Chaitya's mother	Naal	
2020	Nandita Patkar	Mai	Khari Biscuit	
2021	Not Awarded			
2022	Not Awarded			
2023	Anita Date-Kelkar	Vasantrao's Mother	Me Vasantrao	
2023	Gauri Nalawade	Gautami	Godavari	
2023	Jiya Shankar	Nisha Katkar	Ved	
2023	Shruti Marathe	Maharani Soyarabai	Sarsenapati Hambirrao	
2023	Urmila Kothare	Shruti	Ekda Kaay Zala	
2024	Shivani Surve	Manali	Jhimma 2	
2024	Suhas Joshi	Indumati Karnik	Jhimma 2	
2024	Anita Date-Kelkar	Avani	Vaalvi	
2024	Devika Daftardar	Bandya's mother	Unaad	
2025	Ashwini Bhave	Ahilya Gharat	Gharat Ganpati	
2025	Subhangi Gokhale	Kusum Aatya	Gharat Ganpati	
2025	Chinmayee Sumeet	Minakshi Devi	Phullwanti	
2025	Medha Manjrekar	Suhasini Pathak	Juna Furniture	
