= Ghantaa =

- Promotional poster
- Directed by: Shailesh Shankar Kale
- Screenplay by: Suumit Bonkar; Rahul Yashod
- Story by: Shailesh Shankar Kale
- Produced by: Shailesh Shankar Kale; Rohit Shetty; Nitin Vaidya; Ninad Vaidya; Aparna Padgaonkar; Deepesh Shah
- Starring: Amey Wagh; Atharva Welankar; Saksham Kulkarni; Anuja Sathe; Pushkar Shrotri; Kishor kadam
- Cinematography: Siddhartha More
- Edited by: Pankaj Deepak Hurne
- Music by: Aditya Bedekar
- Production companies: Shloksmit Films; Auruous Avatar; Yellow Inc
- Distributed by: Dashami Studioz
- Release date: 14 October 2016
- Running time: 115 minutes
- Country: India
- Language: Marathi

Ghantaa (Marathi: घंटा) is a 2016 Indian Marathi language comedy film produced and directed by Shailesh Shankar Kale. The movie stars Amey Wagh, Aroh Welankar and Saksham Kulkarni in the lead roles.

The film is based on the antics of three young men who end up in trouble while betting on cricket matches. Ghantaa was released on 14 October 2016 in India.

== Cast ==
- Amey Wagh as Raj
- Aroh Welankar as Angad
- Saksham Kulkarni as Umesh
- Anuja Sathe as Komal Bhabhi
- Pushkar Shrotri as Digya Bhai
- Kishor Kadam as Chintya Bhai
- Shivani Surve as Anagha
- Abhijeet Chavan as Mahesh Kalani
- Murli Sharma as Sanjay Hegde
- Arun Kadam as Pichkya
- Mayur Khandge as Gajju
- Vinod Jadhav as Gajju Gang's member
- Vijay Andalkar as Salman Khan
- Viju Khote as Kalani's grandpa
- Ganesh Mayekar as Khajvya
- Kanchan Pagare as Sanjay
- Amol Parchure as News Reporter
- Sagar Satpute as Punter

== Plot ==
Angad, Raaj and Umesh are three chuddy buddies. They all have their independent personalities but would die for the bonding they share with each other. Everything they do in each other's company and now it is their life taking shape, challenging the friendship.

Umesh is tech-geek, wanting to have his own social media site. He keeps posting the super PJs all the time. Angad struggling to become a dubbing artist and having a studio of his own. Raaj doesn't really know what he would do apart from a modelling agency. But one thing is hard-rock clear for them - they have to earn bucks for their dreams - bending down to the destiny or twicking it, anyway.

The motto of life here is Give it a shot or get - Ghantaa. Ghantaa literally means bells but in colloquial means bollocks. So, try till you get something, at least Ghantaa. Everyone prays for one golden opportunity to ring the bells but when this opportunity appears in front of you, does one really able to grab it ?? Funniest answer to this question is Ghantaa. The rat race in career, pressures for the girl friend's folks to settle as early as possible and the risky temptations luring one around. None can escape the mess- gangsters, police, the wannabe politicians, party workers, businessmen, could the three smart but well meaning youngsters can achieve their dreams through this mess.

== Soundtrack ==
Ghantaa

Soundtrack album by Samir Saptiskar
- Released: 29 September 2016
- Genre: Feature film soundtrack
- Length: 19:18
- Language: Marathi
- Label: Video Palace
External audio
- Audio Jukebox on YouTube

Music for this film is composed by Samir Saptiskar while lyrics are penned by Abhishek Khankar.

Tracklist
No.	Title	Singer(s)	Length
1.	"Ghantaa"	Avdhoot Gupte	03:59
2.	"Unbreakable"	Hariharan & Shannon Donald	04:23
3.	"Jugaad"	Urmila Dhangar & Jasraj Joshi	04:07
4.	"Ghadyal"	Samir Saptiskar, Abhishek Khankar & Snehal Malgundkar	03:46
5.	"Aao Meena"	Rupali Moghe	03:03
Total length:			19:18

== Critical reception ==
Mihir Bhanage of The Times of India gave the film a rating of 3 out of 5 saying that, "Comedy is a risky business; you either make people laugh genuinely or end up evoking helpless guffaws owing to ridiculous jokes. 'Ghantaa', however, falls in between these two extremes. If you are looking for a no-brainer that makes you laugh, 'Ghantaa' is a good bet." Abhay Salvi of Marathi Stars gave the film a rating of 2.5 out of 5 and said that, "Ghantaa is enjoyable & definitely worth a watch, the errors are there but they won’t hit you on the face." Ulhas Shirke of Marathi Movie World gave the film a rating of 2.5 out of 5 saying that, "All in all, ‘Ghantaa‘ has turned out to be neither a family entertainer, nor a sensible film to fit into quality Marathi film. All that it offers is a casual adult comedy." Amol Parchure of Film Companion called the film a brainless comedy but appreciated the graphics, music and the acting performances of Amey Wagh and Anuja Sathe and gave the film a rating of 2.5 out of 5.
