= Unn Sawali =

- Theatrical release poster
- Directed by: Diwakar Naaik
- Screenplay by: Diwakar Naaik and Abhay Vardhan
- Story by: Abhay Vardhan
- Produced by: Sameer A Shaikh
- Starring: Bhushan Pradhan; Shivani Surve; Ajinkya Nanaware
- Cinematography: Fasahat Khan
- Edited by: Jitendra K. Shah
- Music by: Sarthak Nakul
- Production company: Ticket Window Pictures
- Distributed by: Manoj Nandwana, Jai Viratra Entertainment Limited
- Release date: 15 March 2024
- Country: India
- Language: Marathi

Unn Sawali (transl. Sun Shade) is a 2024 Indian Marathi-language romantic film featuring Bhushan Pradhan and Shivani Surve in the leading roles. The film is produced by Sameer A Shaikh under the banner of Ticket Window Pictures.

== Synopsis ==
The film narrates the love story of Pranay and Anvi. Pranay portrayed by Bhushan Pradhan is initially reluctant to get married while Anvi played by Shivani Surve does not want to marry at all. However, both agree to marriage to honor their parents' wishes. The story takes a captivating turn when Pranay falls in love with Anvi at first sight, but Anvi continues to resist setting the stage for a compelling romantic drama.

== Cast ==
- Bhushan Pradhan as Pranay
- Shivani Surve as Aanvi
- Ajinkya Nanaware as Vinay
- Raj Sarnagat as Aditya
- Ankita Bhoir as Swati Ma'am
- Vikas Hande as Pranay's father
- Shweta Kamat as Pranay's Mother
- Priya Tuljapurkar as Avni's Mother
- Manali Nikam as Pranay's Assistant

== Productions ==
The film is produced by Sameer A Shaikh directed by Diwakar Naaik with a story by Abhay Vardhan. The music is composed by Sarthak Nakul. Unn Sawali hit theaters on 15 March 2024.
