= Anaan =

Ardha Nari Nateshwar- Anaan
- Directed by: Rajesh Kushte
- Screenplay by: Rajesh Kushte; Mukesh Jadhav
- Story by: Hemant Bhatia
- Produced by: Raunaq Bhatia; Hemant Bhatia
- Starring: Prarthana Behere; Omkar Shinde; Sukhada Khandkekar; Suyog Gorhe; Uday Nene; Prajakta Mali; Shilpa Tulaskar; Yatin Karyekar; Veena Jagtap; Akshata Tikhe; Rajendra Shisatkar
- Music by: Saurabh-Durgesh
- Production company: Rohan Theatres Pvt. Ltd.
- Release date: 22 September 2017
- Country: India
- Language: Marathi

Anaan is a 2017 Indian Marathi-language film produced by Raunaq Bhatia & Hemant Bhatia under the banner of Rohan Theatres Pvt. Ltd. It is being directed by Rajesh Kushte. The film stars Prarthana Behere along with Omkar Shinde, Sukhada Khandkekar, Suyog Gorhe, Uday Nene, Shilpa Tulaskar, Yatin Karyekar, Prajakta Mali, Uday Sabnis, Veena Jagtap, Rajendra Shisatkar, Sneha Raikar, Akshata Tikhe and Bhumi Dali.

== Cast ==
- Omkar Shinde as Yuvraj
- Prarthana Behere as Neel
- Sukhada Khandkekar as Kris
- Yatin Karyekar
- Shilpa Tulaskar
- Uday Sabnis
- Veena Jagtap
- Rajendra Shisatkar
- Sneha Raikar
- Prajakta Mali
- Uday Nene
- Suyog Gorhe
- Akshata Tikhe
- Bhumi Dali

== Production ==
Raunaq Bhatia and Hemant Bhatia produced this movie, co-produced by Kailash Chumbhale, Shivkumar Sharma, Radheya Malpani. Story by Hemant Bhatia, Screenplay & Dialogues by Rajesh Kushte and Mukesh Jadhav, DOP is Raj Kadur, Editing by Sejal Painter. Music is given by Saurabh Shetye and Durgesh Khot, and songs sung by Sonu Nigam, Aanandi Joshi, Ravindra Sathe, Pooja Gaitonde and Saurabh Shetye.

== Soundtrack ==
No.	Title	Singer(s)	Length
1	"Gandhi Sugandhi"	Sonu Nigam, Aanandi Joshi	4:25
2	"Ek Surya"	Saurabh Shetye, Aanandi Joshi	3:31
3	"Anaan Tandav"	Ravindra Sathe, Saurabh Shetye	3:20
4	"Kaahe Tu"	Pooja Gaitonde	4:48
5	"Naar Nashili"	Rajesh Kushte	3:43
6	"Anaan Tandav" (Trap Mix)	Ravindra Sathe, Saurabh Shetye	3:25
