= Thoda Tuza Ani Thoda Maza =

2024 Marathi language television series

- Genre: Drama
- Screenplay by: Pralhad Kudtarkar
- Story by: Atul Ketkar
- Directed by: Chandrakant Kanse
- Starring: See below
- Composer: Avinash-Vishwajeet
- Country of origin: India
- Original language: Marathi
- No. of episodes: 329

Production
- Producers: Aparna Ketkar; Atul Ketkar
- Production locations: Mumbai, Maharashtra
- Editors: Ashwini Nanda; Ramesh Bagde
- Camera setup: Multi-camera
- Running time: 22 minutes
- Production company: Right Click Media Solutions

Original release
- Network: Star Pravah
- Release: 17 June 2024 – 12 September 2025

Related
- Deivamagal

Thoda Tuza Ani Thoda Maza (transl. A little bit of yours and a little bit of mine) is an Indian Marathi language television series that airs on Star Pravah. It stars Shivani Surve, Sameer Paranjape and Manasi Kulkarni in lead roles. It is produced by Atul and Aparna Ketkar under the banner of Right Click Media Solutions. It premiered from 17 June 2024 by replacing Tuzech Mi Geet Gaat Aahe. It is an official remake of Tamil TV series Deivamagal.

== Plot ==
The story mainly revolves around Tejas, Manasi and Tejas' eldest sister-in-law Gayatri. Gayatri's conspiracies against their families to acquire Tejas' ancestral property. Manasi grows up in rich family in the village. Her parents are loving. She has a younger sister. Her father arranges marriage for her with Ranjit a businessman. Unfortunately, Ranjit and Manasi's wedding is halted. Due to this, Manasi's father dies of a heart attack. After her father's death, Manasi and her family moves to her maternal uncle Kamlakar's house. There Manasi and her family suffer much because of her greedy aunt Shobha. Shobha starts to take revenge on Manasi's family as Manasi's father had rejected her son's marriage proposal with Manasi. Shobha determines to chase Manasi and her family from her house.

== Cast ==
=== Main ===
- Shivani Surve as Manasi Sampat Sanas / Manasi Tejas Prabhu (Lucky Charm)
- Sameer Paranjape as Tejas Prabhakar Prabhu (Rashtrahit)
- Manasi Kulkarni as Gayatri Dixit / Gayatri Dinesh Prabhu; Tejas' sister-in-law

=== Recurring ===
- Amogh Chandan as Dinesh Prabhakar Prabhu; Tejas' elder brother, Gayatri's husband
- Manasi Ghate as Chhaya Dixit; Gayatri's sister
- Rugved Phadke as Vinod; Chhaya's husband
- Pranav Prabhakar as Suraj Prabhakar Prabhu; Tejas' older brother
- Sonal Pawar as Geeta Suraj Prabhu; Suraj's wife
- Madhavi Soman as Sampada Sampat Sanas; Manasi's mother
- Shivshailesh Korde as Sampat Sanas; Manasi's father
- Sharvari Pendharkar as Nidhi Sampat Sanas; Manasi's sister
- Devendra Dodke as Kamlakar; Manasi's maternal uncle
- Purnima Talwalkar as Shobha; Manasi's maternal aunt
- Rutvij Kulkarni as Vineet; Kamlakar and Shobha's son
- Anjali Joglekar as Sunanda Prabhakar Prabhu; Tejas' mother
- Trupti Ravindra / Sakhi Gundaye as Aabha Prabhakar Prabhu; Tejas' sister
- Gargi Phule-Thatte as Rajani Jahagirdar; Ranjeet's mother
- Omprakash Shinde as Ranjeet Jahagirdar; Manasi's fiance
- Priyanka Nar as Manaswi; Manasi's cousin

== Production ==
=== Casting ===
Shivani Surve, who had her last appearance in Bigg Boss Marathi season 2, returned to the Star Pravah after a hiatus of nine years to take on the role of Manasi Sanas, the female lead. Sameer Paranjape was selected to played the role of Tejas Prabhu, the male lead after seeing his role in Sundara Manamadhe Bharli. Manasi Kulkarni was chosen to portray Gayatri Prabhu, the antagonist, while Gargi Phule-Thatte and Omprakash Shinde was chosen to portray the role of mother-son, Rajani Jahagirdar and Ranjit Jahagirdar respectively. Manasi Ghate also played the supporting role of Chhaya.

=== Title song ===
The title song "Thoda Tuza Ani Thoda Maza" features music composed by Avinash-Vishwajeet. The song is sung by Aarya Ambekar and Nachiket Lele.
