= Suyog Gorhe =

Indian actor

- Born: Nashik, Maharashtra, India
- Occupation: Actor
- Years active: 2017–present
- Spouse: Neha Shinde (m. 2021)

Suyog Gorhe is an Indian actor predominantly works in Marathi film industry. He is known for his roles in Satarcha Salman, Shentimental, Krutant and Girlfriend.

== Early life and education ==
Suyog was born and brought up in Nashik, Maharashtra. He has studied from HPT Arts and RYK Science College and graduated as Homeopathy physician from Motiwala Homeopathy Medical College.

== Filmography ==
=== Film ===
- All movies are in Marathi, unless mentioned.

Year	Film	Role	Notes	Ref(s)
2017	Bus Stop	Sumedh	Debut	
2017	Shentimental	Manoj Pandey		
2017	Anaan			
2019	Krutant	Samyak		
2019	Aamhi Befikar			
2019	Safe Journeys	Harman	TV Mini series; 1 episode	
2019	Girlfriend	Sandy		
2019	Senior Citizen			
2023	Satarcha Salman	Amit Kalbhor		
2023	Phakaat	Raju		
2025	Taath Kana			

=== Television ===
Year	Title	Role	Ref(s)
2017–2020	Majhya Navaryachi Bayko	Kunal Kulkarni; Shanaya's husband	
2026	Aga Aai Aaho Aai		

== Personal life ==
He is married to his girlfriend Neha Shinde at hometown.
