= Anita Date-Kelkar =

Indian actress

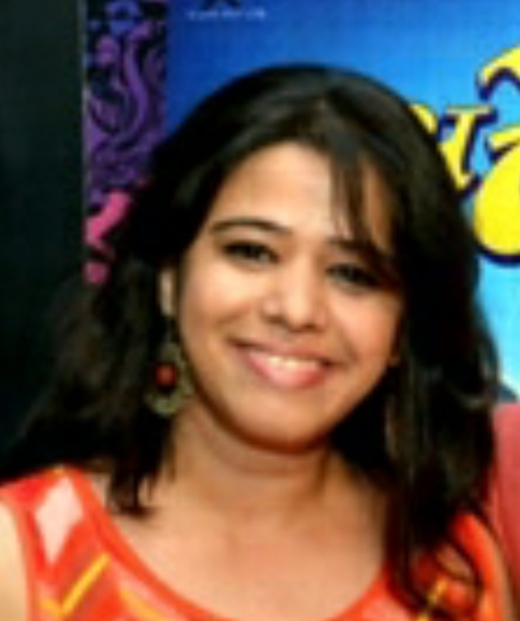
- Born: Anita Date; 31 October 1980 (age 45); Nashik, Maharashtra, India
- Occupation: Actress
- Years active: 2008 – present
- Spouse: Chinmay Kelkar (m. 2008)

Anita Date-Kelkar (née Date) is an Indian actress. She works predominantly in Marathi and Hindi television. She is best known for her role in Zee Marathi television series Majhya Navaryachi Bayko. She is also widely known for her role in the film Me Vasantrao for which she won the Filmfare Award Marathi for Best Supporting Actress at the 7th Filmfare Awards Marathi and Zee Chitra Gaurav Puraskar for Best Supporting Actress. She won another two Filmfare Awards Marathi in the same category for her performances in the films Vaalvi (2023) and Jarann (2025).

== Early life ==
Anita was born on 31 October 1980 in Nashik, Maharashtra. She did her schooling from M. R. Sharda Kanya Vidya Mandir, Nashik and she did Master of Arts from Lalit Kala Kendra, Pune University.

== Career ==
She started her career in 2008 with Marathi film Sanai Choughade. She also appeared in the various Marathi films like Coffee Ani Barach Kahi, Ajoba, Popat, Seema, Gandha, Myna, A Paying Ghost, Jogwa, Adgula Madgula, etc. In 2012, she played a role in Hindi film Aiyyaa. In 2019, she did a role in Tumbbad.

She made her television debut with Marathi serial Daar Ughada Na Gade. She did a supporting role in Agnihotra, Manthan, Anamika and Eka Lagnachi Tisri Goshta and in Hindi serial she played role in Baal Veer, Bandini and Bhai Bhaiya Aur Brother. She played the lead role in Majhya Navaryachi Bayko on Zee Marathi. Currently, she is playing Rama in Nava Gadi Nava Rajya on Zee Marathi since 2022.

== Personal life ==
She got married with Chinmay Kelkar who is also an actor.

== Filmography ==
=== Films ===
| Year | Show | Role | Language | Ref. |
|---|---|---|---|---|
| 2008 | Sanai Choughade | Seema | Marathi | |
| 2009 | Zor Lagaa Ke...Haiya! | | Hindi | |
| 2009 | Jogwa | Saku | Marathi | |
| 2009 | Gandha | Seema | Marathi | |
| 2011 | Adgula Madgula | | Marathi | |
| 2012 | Aiyyaa | Mynah | Hindi | |
| 2013 | Popat | | Marathi | |
| 2014 | Ajoba | Mugdha | Marathi | |
| 2015 | Coffee Ani Barach Kahi | | Marathi | |
| 2015 | A Paying Ghost | Vrunda | Marathi | |
| 2018 | Tumbbad | Vaidehi | Hindi | |
| 2020 | Me Vasantrao | Vasantrao's Mother | Marathi | |
| 2023 | Vaalvi | Avani | Marathi | |
| 2025 | Jarann | Ganguti | Marathi | |

=== Television ===
| Year | Show | Role | Language |
|---|---|---|---|
| 2008 | Daar Ughada Na Gade | Lead role | Marathi |
| 2008 | Agnihotra | Press reporter (Episode 90-93) | Marathi |
| 2009 | Manthan | | Marathi |
| 2009 | Anamika | | Marathi |
| 2010 | Bandini | | Hindi |
| 2012 | Bhai Bhaiya Aur Brother | Member of Patel family | Hindi |
| 2013-2014 | Eka Lagnachi Tisri Goshta | Ashwini Ketkar | Marathi |
| 2013 | Baal Veer | Tabahee | Hindi |
| 2016-2021 | Majhya Navaryachi Bayko | Radhika Subhedar | Marathi |
| 2019 | Kanala Khada | Guest appearance | Marathi |
| 2021 | Chala Hawa Yeu Dya | Contestant | Marathi |
| 2022 | Kitchen Kallakar | Guest appearance | Marathi |
| 2022-2023 | Nava Gadi Nava Rajya | Rama Karnik | Marathi |
| 2024-2026 | Indrayani | Anandibai Digraskar | Marathi |
| 2026 | Sanai Chaughade | Radhika Subhedar | Marathi |

=== Theater ===
- Just Halka Fulka
- Mahasagar
- Uney Pure Shahar Ek
- Kon Mhantay Takka Dila
- Tichi 17 Prakarne
- Necropolice
- Bar Bar
- Cigarette
- Govinda Ghya Kuni Gopal Ghya
- A Bhai Doka Nako Khau
- Bai Ga Kamalach Zhali
- Kirkol Navre
- To Rajhans Ek
- Dagad Ani Mati

== Awards and nominations ==
| Year | Category | Award | Work | Result | Ref. |
|---|---|---|---|---|---|
| 2016 | Best Mother | Zee Marathi Utsav Natyancha Awards | Majhya Navaryachi Bayko | Won | |
| 2016 | Best Actress | Zee Marathi Utsav Natyancha Awards | Majhya Navaryachi Bayko | Nominated | |
| 2016 | Best Character Female | Zee Marathi Utsav Natyancha Awards | Majhya Navaryachi Bayko | Nominated | |
| 2017 | Best Actress | Zee Marathi Utsav Natyancha Awards | Majhya Navaryachi Bayko | Nominated | |
| 2017 | Best Mother | Zee Marathi Utsav Natyancha Awards | Majhya Navaryachi Bayko | Nominated | |
| 2017 | Best Character Female | Zee Marathi Utsav Natyancha Awards | Majhya Navaryachi Bayko | Won | |
| 2018 | Best Actress | Zee Marathi Utsav Natyancha Awards | Majhya Navaryachi Bayko | Won | |
| 2018 | Best Character Female | Zee Marathi Utsav Natyancha Awards | Majhya Navaryachi Bayko | Won | |
| 2018 | Most Strong Character of the Year | Zee Marathi Utsav Natyancha Awards | Majhya Navaryachi Bayko | Won | |
| 2018 | Best Mother | Zee Marathi Utsav Natyancha Awards | Majhya Navaryachi Bayko | Nominated | |
| 2019 | Best Actress | Zee Marathi Utsav Natyancha Awards | Majhya Navaryachi Bayko | Nominated | |
| 2019 | Best Character Female | Zee Marathi Utsav Natyancha Awards | Majhya Navaryachi Bayko | Nominated | |
| 2019 | Best Mother | Zee Marathi Utsav Natyancha Awards | Majhya Navaryachi Bayko | Nominated | |
| 2019 | Most Influential Character of the Year | Zee Marathi Utsav Natyancha Awards | Majhya Navaryachi Bayko | Won | |
| 2021 | Special Mention | Zee Marathi Utsav Natyancha Awards | Majhya Navaryachi Bayko | Honoured | |
| 2023 | Best Supporting Actress | 7th Filmfare Awards Marathi | Me Vasantrao | Won | |
| 2023 | Best Supporting Actress | Zee Chitra Gaurav Puraskar | Me Vasantrao | Won | |
| 2023 | Best Actress in a Supporting Role | Maharashtra Times Sanman Awards | Me Vasantrao | Won | |
| 2023 | Best Actress in a Supporting Role | Sakal Premier Awards | Me Vasantrao | Won | |
| 2024 | Best Supporting Actress | Zee Chitra Gaurav Puraskar | Vaalvi | Nominated | |
| 2024 | Best Supporting Actress | 8th Filmfare Awards Marathi | Vaalvi | Won | |
| 2024 | Best Actress in a Supporting Role | Fakt Marathi Cine Sanman | Vaalvi | Won | |
| 2024 | MFK Award for Favourite Supporting Actress | Maharashtracha Favourite Kon? | Vaalvi | Nominated | |
| 2026 | Best Supporting Actress | Zee Chitra Gaurav Puraskar | Jarann | Won | |
| 2026 | Best Supporting Actress | 10th Filmfare Awards Marathi | Jarann | Won | |
