= A Paying Ghost =

- A Paying Ghost
- Directed by: Sushrut Bhagwat
- Screenplay by: Sanjay D. Mone
- Story by: V.P. Kale
- Produced by: Jayant Lade
- Starring: Umesh Kamat; Spruha Joshi; Pushkar Shrotri; Mahesh Manjrekar; Sharad Kelkar; Sharvani Pillai; Atul Parchure; Samir Choughule; Anita Date Kelkar
- Cinematography: Prasad Bhende
- Edited by: Rajesh Rao
- Music by: Narendra Bhide
- Production company: Lade Bros Film Pvt. Ltd.
- Release date: 29 May 2015
- Running time: 130 minutes
- Country: India
- Language: Marathi

A Paying Ghost (Marathi : अ पेईंग घोस्ट) is a Marathi language supernatural comedy film, released in 2015. The story is based on the novel Badli, by V. P. Kale. It was directed by Sushrut Bhagwat, with a screenplay by Sanjay Mone. It was produced by Lade Bros Films Pvt. Ltd. and was the first Marathi film with 70 minutes of visual effects. The visual effects were designed by Om Kamal.

== Plot ==
The movie is based on a comic novel by Marathi novelist V. P. Kale. It tells the story of a typical Mumbai resident and a family of ghosts who help him to overcome the challenges of daily life.

Madhav is a kind-hearted simpleton. He lives alone in Anand Ashram Chawl as he has no parents or siblings. Vrunda, the girl next door, likes him and is always trying to win his heart. But Madhav is pursuing a co-worker from his office, Madhavi. Madhav's friend Vasant tries to play cupid between Madhav and Madhavi leading to comical situations in the office.

One night Madhav, returning home late from the office, encounters a family of ghosts: Gajanan Ekbote and Gamini Ekbote, and their six daughters. The ghost family have no place to stay and hence make a request to become paying guests at Madhav's house. In return, Gajanan Ekbote promises they will take care of all Madhav's housework and any renovations. Although scared and unsure of the future, Madhav is not used to saying no to anyone, and so he agrees.

Madhav slowly becomes accustomed to living with this new, unconventional family. One day, Vasant tells him that Madhavi is getting married. Knowing Madhav's nature, Gajanan and Gamini set up Madhav with Madhavi; their efforts prove successful and the pair marry. Eventually, Madhavi begins to notice the presence of unseen people in her house and Madhav confesses the truth about the ghost family.

== Releases ==
=== India ===
Prior to A Paying Ghost's public release, Lade Bros. Films PVT LTD hosted private screenings on 28 May 2015 at Mumbai, Aurangabad, Nagpur, Kolhapur, Pune, and other cities. Lade Bros. Films then showed A Paying Ghost to some of the Marathi and Bollywood industry's filmmakers and actors in a first-look screening at the Fun Republic Theatre on 29 May 2015. On the following day, the film was screened at 200 theatres nation-wide.

=== Overseas ===
A Paying Ghost became the first Marathi film to screen overseas in more than 20 cities. It was screened in the UK (London, Birmingham, Leicester, Slough, Manchester), Europe (Germany, Switzerland, Holland), United States (San Francisco, Richmond), Australia (Sydney, Adelaide, Melbourne), New Zealand (Auckland) UAE (Dubai) and Singapore. It was critically and commercially acclaimed by international audiences.

== Home media ==
A Paying Ghost's world television premiere was held on 20 March 2016 on Star Pravah where it set a record for TRP (Television Rating Point) on Star Pravah.

== Cast ==
- Umesh Kamat as Madhav
- Spruha Joshi as Madhavi
- Pushkar Shrotri as Gajanan
- Sharvani Pillai as Gamini
- Samir Choughule as Ganpule
- Anita Date-Kelkar as Vrunda
- Atul Parchure as Vasant
- Mahesh Manjrekar as Sadanand
- Sharad Kelkar
- Samruddhi Salvi

== Music ==
After winning an award for 'Best Background Score' at the Kalyan International Film Festival for the movie 'Rama Madhav', Marathi musician Narendra Bhide was chosen to compose the score and soundtrack for 'Paying Ghost.'

=== Soundtrack ===
S. No.	Song	Singer	Lyricist	Music composer
01	"Go Go Govinda" (Dahi Handi)	Avadhoot Gupte	Vaibhav Joshi	Narendra bhide
02	"Raat Bhar" (romantic)	Hrishikesh Ranade, Anandi Joshi	Vaibhav Joshi	Narendra bhide
