= Saurabh-Durgesh =

Saurabh Durgesh
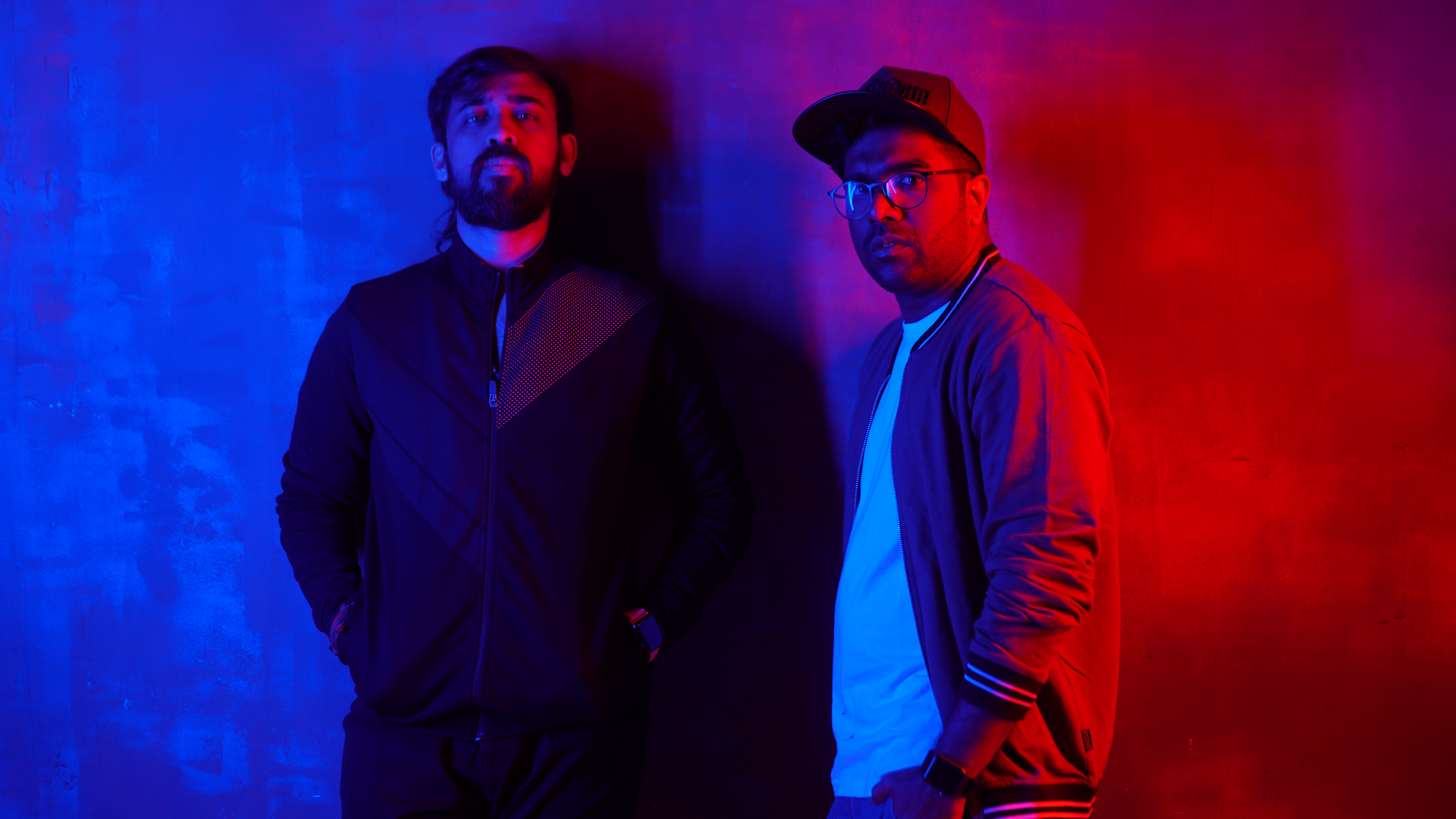
- Saurabh Durgesh

Background information
- Origin: Mumbai, India
- Genres: Indian film music
- Occupation: Music director
- Years active: 2016–present

Saurabh Durgesh is a Chillout/Electronica/Pop Music Producer duo composed of Saurabh Shetye and Durgesh Khot hailing from Mumbai, India.

== Musical career ==
Saurabh and Durgesh defined their musical tenacity with the release of their music video Aag Ka Gola L.A., an International Collaboration with the Step-Up 2 Famed Hollywood Actor Robert Hoffman. They were long-time friends, and having completed Engineering, shifted into the Music Field. They had been performing live for a couple of years from 2011-2014 with the band Indo Gypsies before moving on to the film industry as music directors. The duo has composed music in multiple films including Pappu Ki Pugdandi(2015), Amrita And I(2016), Anaan(2017) and Maza Algaar(2017). They are also behind the music for a variety of TV Commercials for brand campaigns like Jeep Compass, Kelloggs and Eva among others. Saurabh - Durgesh perform their originals in a unique EDM act laced with Live Vocals, Instruments and Samples which gives an edge in the traditional DJ Space as well.

== Music Singles ==
Saurabh - Durgesh have composed, arranged and produced these songs as single releases.

Song name	Singer	Lyrics
Ruk Ja	Saurabh Shetye, Smriti Thakur, Prim4l	Saurabh Durgesh
Na Sata	Saurabh Shetye	Saurabh Durgesh
Dhalti Shaamein Yun Hi	Saurabh Shetye	Saurabh Durgesh
Badarwa	Saurabh Shetye	Saurabh Durgesh
Phir Se Chalo Uss Ore	Saurabh Shetye	Saurabh Durgesh
So Jaa Re	Saurabh Shetye	Saurabh Durgesh
Dream Voyage - EP	Saurabh Shetye	Saurabh Durgesh
Aag Ka Gola L.A.	Saurabh Shetye	Arsala Qureishi
Naino Ki Aarziyaan	Chinmayi Sripada	Dheeraj Kumar
Nee Venakale Nadichi	Chinmayi Sripada	Anantha Sriram
Mandhira Kannilae	Chinmayi Sripada	Kabilan Vairamuthu

== Discography - Movies ==
Film	Director
Tindey	Seema Desai
Ablakh	Anand Chavan
Monsoon Football	Milind Ukey
Maza Algaar	Millind Raghunath Kamble
Anaan	Rajesh Kushte
Amrita Aur Main	Sumit Mishra
Pappu Ki Pugdandi	Seema Pillay Desai

== Awards ==
Award	Nominated work	Category	Result
6th Mirchi Music Awards	Anaan	Best Upcoming Music Composers of the year	Won
7th Indian Cine Film Festival	Happy Birthday	Best Background Score	Won
