= Jhimma 2 =

2023 Marathi film by Hemant Dhome

- Theatrical release poster
- Directed by: Hemant Dhome
- Screenplay by: Irawati Karnik
- Story by: Hemant Dhome
- Produced by: Jyoti Deshpande; Aanand L. Rai; Kshitee Jog
- Starring: Rinku Rajguru; Shivani Surve; Suhas Joshi; Nirmiti Sawant; Suchitra Bandekar; Siddharth Chandekar
- Cinematography: Satyajeet Shobha Shriram
- Edited by: Faisal Mahadik
- Music by: Score; Aditya Bedekar; Soundtrack; Amitraj
- Production companies: Chalchitra Mandalee; Jio Studios; Colour Yellow Productions; Crazy Few Films
- Distributed by: August Entertainment
- Release date: 24 November 2023
- Running time: 137 minutes
- Country: India
- Language: Marathi
- Box office: est.₹14 crore

Jhimma 2 is a 2023 Indian Marathi language drama film directed by Hemant Dhome and the second installment in the Jhimma series. It has an ensemble cast of Suhas Joshi, Nirmiti Sawant, Siddharth Chandekar, Kshitee Jog, Suchitra Bandekar, Sayali Sanjeev, Shivani Surve, Rinku Rajguru. The film continuing the story of the last film, is a reunion of a group of women exploring friendships and celebrating the 75th birthday of Indumati (Joshi) in a trip to London.

Jhimma 2 was theatrically released on 24 November 2023, it received positive reviews from critics upon release. It has grossed over ₹14 crore (US$1.5 million), emerging as the year's third highest grossing Marathi film.

== Plot ==
The women from the first film reunite in the UK for Indu's 75th birthday, where she reveals a surprise. The seven women then go on a trip together in the Lake District.

== Cast ==
- Siddharth Chandekar as Kabir Kulkarni
- Suchitra Bandekar as Vaishali Deshpande
- Nirmiti Sawant as Nirmala Konde-Patil
- Kshitee Jog as Meeta Jahagirdar
- Suhas Joshi as Indumati Karnik (Indu)
- Sayali Sanjeev as Krutika Joshi
- Shivani Surve as Manali, Vaishali's niece
- Rinku Rajguru as Taniya Konde-Patil, Nirmala's daughter-in-law
- Anant Jog as Vasantrao Konde-Patil (Saheb), Nirmala's husband
- Gandhar Babre as Ankush
- Jack Mcginn as Alister, Krutika's brother-in-law
- Orla Cottingham as Shelly, Krutika's Mother-in-Law
- Maithili Patwardhan as Chingu, Meeta's daughter

== Production ==
The film, a sequel to 2021 film Jhimma was announced on 24 January 2023 by the director Hemant Dhome.

Presented under the banner of Jio Studios & Aanand L Rai, Jyoti Deshpande, Aanand L. Rai and Kshitee Jog are the producers of the film. The cast of Jhimma, Suhas Joshi, Nirmiti Sawant, Kshitee Jog, Suchitra Bandekar, Siddharth Chandekar and Sayali Sanjeev is retained, while Rinku Rajguru, Shivani Surve, Jack Mcginn, and Orla Cottingham are added to the cast. Sonalee Kulkarni and Mrinmayee Godbole are not part of this sequel.

== Soundtrack ==
Jhimma 2

Soundtrack album by Amitraj
- Released: 23 November 2023
- Recorded: 2023
- Genre: Feature film soundtrack
- Length: 15:23
- Language: Marathi
- Label: Zee Music Company

Official audio
- Jhimma 2 - Full Album on YouTube

The film's music was composed by Amitraj while lyrics written by Kshitij Patwardhan. The first song "Marathi Pori" was released on 7 November. Second song "Punha Jhimma" was released on 20 November. The full album was released on 23 November one day before the release of the film.

Track listing
No.	Title	Singer(s)	Length
1.	"Butti Maar"	Amitraj, Aanandi Joshi (Chorus: Swar Tambe, Kasturi Kolatkar, Kavya Bhoir, Raj Thakur Desai, Srushti Patankar, Reet Narang)	03:06
2.	"Punha Jhimma"	Amitraj, Vaishali Samant, Apeksha Dandekar	05:05
3.	"Rang Jarasa Ola"	Shreya Ghoshal, Amitraj	03:38
4.	"Marathi Pori"	Adarsh Shinde, Vaishali Samant, Mugdha Karhade, Amitraj	03:34
Total length:			15:23

== Release ==
The film was theatrically released on 24 November 2023 with over 1300 screens globally.

== Reception ==
=== Critical response ===
Kalpeshraj Kubal of The Times of India gave the film 3/5 stars and wrote, "Jhimma 2 is a story of emotions that also shows a mirror to the viewers, presenting a side of their reality and making them think about the things in life that matter." Tanvi Lad of Film Companion gave a positive review writing, "It stands out among most female-centric movies because its powerful storytelling doesn’t come across as a lecture on feminism." Lad opined that the film has humour and "serves a veritable buffet of feelings" and further praised the soundtrack writing, "The music composed by Amitraj is soothing." Concluding Lad lauded the director, crew and cast writing, "Dhome, his crew and the cast deserves a round of applause for telling a story that is compelling without being preachy, which delivers joy and laughter while emphasising the need for us to introspect as a society." Akhilesh Nerlekar of Loksatta also praised the director, crew and cast. Nerlekar wrote, "A very good story, an equally gripping screenplay and without any pretense of teaching people, they have presented a fun, interesting and equally simple yet thought provoking film." He opined that "Satyajit Sriram's cinematography has come together very well". He appreciated the soundtrack by Amitraj, saying, "[music] brings a different life to the film." Concluding Nerlekar said, "If you want to enjoy a unique Marathi masterpiece that is classy, entertaining and brings tears to your eyes, then it must be watched. Film Information in its review praised overall film and believed that the film "is a surefire hit because it offers wholesome entertainment for the old and the young, classes and masses, girls and boys, men and women."

=== Box office ===
The film had a fair first day at the box office, earning around ₹1.01 crore (US$110,000) net. It showed excellent growth on Saturday, netting ₹2.15 crore (US$230,000). In its first weekend, it collected over ₹5.80 crore (US$620,000). In its first week of release, film grossed ₹7.71 crore (US$820,000). The film collected ₹10.62 crore (US$1.1 million) net in its second week. The film earned ₹14 crore (US$1.5 million) in its fifth week.
