= Jarann =

2025 Indian film by Hrishikesh Gupte

- Theatrical release poster
- Directed by: Hrishikesh Gupte
- Written by: Hrishikesh Gupte
- Produced by: Amol Bhagat; Nitin Bhalchandra Kulkarni; Anees Bazmee
- Starring: Amruta Subhash; Anita Date-Kelkar; Kishor Kadam; Jyoti Malshe; Avanee Joshi
- Cinematography: Milind Jog
- Edited by: Abhijeet Deshpande
- Music by: AV Prafullachandra
- Production companies: Anees Bazmee Productions; A & N Cinema's LLP; A3 Events & Media Services
- Distributed by: Panorama Studios
- Release date: 6 June 2025
- Running time: 124 minutes
- Country: India
- Language: Marathi
- Box office: est.₹9 crore

Jarann is a 2025 Indian Marathi-language psychological horror film written and directed by Hrishikesh Gupte. Produced by Anees Bazmee Productions, A & N Cinema's LLP, and A3 Events & Media Services, and stars Amruta Subhash, Anita Date-Kelkar, Kishor Kadam, Jyoti Malshe, and Avanee Joshi.

The film was theatrically released on 6 June 2025, in theaters across India, Jarann explores themes of psychological turmoil, black magic, and ancient superstitions set in a remote village.

The film is praised for its storytelling and performances, particularly by Amruta, and its story.

== Plot ==
Radha (Amruta Subhash) travels with her daughter, Saie (Avanee Joshi), to her ancestral house in the village. There, Radha discovers an old doll, after which she begins to behave strangely. Even after returning home, her unusual behaviour continues. It is revealed that Radha has shown such symptoms since childhood and has long been under the care of psychiatrist Dr. Dhananjay Kulkarni (Kishor Kadam). She later seeks treatment from Dr. Rashmi Pandit (Jyoti Malshe).

Meanwhile, Saie starts playing with the same doll and claims that it speaks to her. The family's house help (Snehal Shidam) also senses something unsettling about it. Dr. Rashmi contacts Dr. Dhananjay after Radha recounts an incident from her childhood, leading to further revelations from Radha's husband Shekhar (Vikram Gaikwad), her parents (Rajan Bhise and Seema Deshmukh), and Dr. Kulkarni.

The backstory reveals that in her childhood, Radha believed she was the victim of black magic performed by a woman named Ganguti (Anita Date-Kelkar), who lived on the upper floor of their ancestral home. Though Radha's condition had temporarily improved, her episodes resurfaced after her marriage to Shekhar. It is also revealed that Saie is not Radha's biological daughter.

The narrative then explores whether Radha is ultimately cured of her recurring condition and what role the mysterious doll plays in her and Saie's lives.

== Cast ==
- Amruta Subhash as Radha
  - Durva Deodhar as young Radha
- Anita Date-Kelkar as Ganguti
- Kishor Kadam as Dr. Dhananjay Kulkarni, Radha's childhood psychiatrist
- Jyoti Malshe as Dr. Rashmi Pandit, Radha's current psychiatrist
- Avanee Joshi as Saie, Radha's daughter
- Amruta Modak as Revati
- Rajan Bhise as Radha's father
- Vikram Gaikwad as Shekhar, Radha's husband
- Seema Deshmukh as Radha's mother
- Prajakta Datar as Priyanka
- Dhananjay Sardeshpande as Upadhye Guruji
- Rama Nadgauda as Priyanka's mother
- Vaishali Rajeghatge as Raut Kaku *Shrikant Prabhudesai as Kaka
- Vedant Prabhudesai as RRadh's cousin
- Snehal Shidam as the house help
- Bhargavi Chirmule in a special appearance in the song "Jarann"
- Sonalee Kulkarni in a special appearance in the song "Jarann"

== Marketing and release ==
The trailer launch event was held on 23 May 2025 in Mumbai. Jarann was released on 6 June 2025, in theaters.

The film was digitally released on 8 August 2025 on ZEE5.

== Reception ==
=== Critical response ===
Jarann received generally positive reviews for its performances, direction, and atmospheric tension, though some criticized its slow pacing and unclear ending. Amruta Subhash's portrayal of Radha was widely praised, with Scroll.in calling her "terrified, terrifying, and terrific," highlighting her ability to convey complex emotions. Aarti Borade of TV9 Marathi wrote "The story of the film, though simple, is very deep while cinematography and background music make the film more terrifying, but the lack of VFX is annoying at some places." Sameer Jawale of Loksatta praised performances by Amruta Subhash (Radha) and Anita Date (Ganguti), music, cinematography and a gripping climax with two surprising twists.

Kalpeshraj Kubal of Maharashtra Times rated 3 stars out of 5 stars and describes Jarann as "a slow-starting film that accelerates into a gripping, psychologically complex horror experience. It uses subtle hints and metaphors, with a disjointed narrative and abrupt character exits, making it unconventional. Ideal for fans of psychoanalytic horror, it may not appeal to those expecting a typical horror movie." Anupama Gunde of Pudhari rated 4 stars out of 5 stars and wrote "If the film had shed light on the motives and mindset of the character who practices black magic like Ganguti, this film would have been more gripping."

=== Box office ===
The film collected ₹1.65 crore in second weekend. The film earned ₹3.5 crore in twelve days. By the end of third week it earned ₹6 crore.

In twenty four days the film collected ₹6.51 crore. The film earned ₹9 crore in its final theatrical run.

=== Accolades ===
Awards	Year	Category	Recipient	Result	Ref
Lokshahi Marathi Chitra Sanman	2025	Best Film	Jarann	Pending	
Lokshahi Marathi Chitra Sanman	2025	Best Actress	Amruta Subhash	Pending	
Lokshahi Marathi Chitra Sanman	2025	Best Supporting Actress	Anita Date-Kelkar	Pending	
Lokshahi Marathi Chitra Sanman	2025	Best Child Actor	Avanee Joshi	Pending	
Lokshahi Marathi Chitra Sanman	2025	Best Story	Hrishikesh Gupte	Pending	
Zee Chitra Gaurav Puraskar	2026	Best Film	Jarann	Nominated	
Zee Chitra Gaurav Puraskar	2026	Best Director	Hrishikesh Gupte	Nominated	
Zee Chitra Gaurav Puraskar	2026	Best Story	Hrishikesh Gupte	Nominated	
Zee Chitra Gaurav Puraskar	2026	Best Screenplay	Hrishikesh Gupte	Nominated	
Zee Chitra Gaurav Puraskar	2026	Best Actress	Amruta Subhash	Won	
Zee Chitra Gaurav Puraskar	2026	Best Supporting Actress	Anita Date-Kelkar	Won	
Zee Chitra Gaurav Puraskar	2026	Best Background Score	AV Prafullachandra	Nominated	
Zee Chitra Gaurav Puraskar	2026	Best Cinematographer	Milind Jog	Nominated	
Zee Chitra Gaurav Puraskar	2026	Best Editor	Abhijeet Deshpande	Nominated	
Zee Chitra Gaurav Puraskar	2026	Best Choreographer	Dheeraj Bhalerao	Nominated	
Zee Chitra Gaurav Puraskar	2026	Best Sound Recordist	Mandar Kamalapurkar	Won	
Zee Chitra Gaurav Puraskar	2026	Best Costume	Devika Kale	Nominated	
Zee Chitra Gaurav Puraskar	2026	Best Makeup	Saurabh Kapade, Girish Shinde	Nominated	
Maharashtra Times Sanman	2026	Best Film	Jarann	Nominated	
Maharashtra Times Sanman	2026	Best Director	Hrishikesh Gupte	Nominated	
Maharashtra Times Sanman	2026	Best Screenplay	Hrishikesh Gupte	Nominated	
Maharashtra Times Sanman	2026	Best Actress	Amruta Subhash	Nominated	
Maharashtra Times Sanman	2026	Best Supporting Actress	Anita Date-Kelkar	Nominated	
Maharashtra Times Sanman	2026	Best Cinematographer	Milind Jog	Nominated	
Maharashtra Times Sanman	2026	Best Editor	Abhijeet Deshpande	Won	
Indian National Cine Academy	2026	Best Film	Jarann	Nominated	
Indian National Cine Academy	2026	Best Director	Hrishikesh Gupte	Nominated	
Indian National Cine Academy	2026	Best Actress	Amruta Subhash	Won	
Indian National Cine Academy	2026	Best Supporting Actor	Kishor Kadam	Nominated	
Indian National Cine Academy	2026	Best Supporting Actress	Anita Date-Kelkar	Nominated	
Indian National Cine Academy	2026	Best Background Score	AV Prafullachandra	Nominated	
Indian National Cine Academy	2026	Best Costume	Devika Kale	Nominated	
Indian National Cine Academy	2026	Best Dance Choreographer	Dheeraj Bhalerao	Nominated	
City Cine Awards Marathi	2026	Best Film	Jarann	Pending	
City Cine Awards Marathi	2026	Best Director	Hrishikesh Gupte	Pending	
City Cine Awards Marathi	2026	Best Screenplay	Hrishikesh Gupte	Pending	
City Cine Awards Marathi	2026	Best Actress	Amruta Subhash	Pending	
City Cine Awards Marathi	2026	Best Supporting Actor – Female	Anita Date-Kelkar	Pending	
