= Sabar Bonda =

2025 film directed by Rohan Parashuram Kanawade

- Indian theatrical release poster
- Directed by: Rohan Parashuram Kanawade
- Written by: Rohan Parashuram Kanawade
- Produced by: Neeraj Churi; Mohamed Khaki; Kaushik Ray; Hareesh Reddypalli; Naren Chandavarkar; Sidharth Meer
- Starring: Bhushaan Manoj; Suraaj Suman
- Cinematography: Vikas Urs
- Edited by: Anadi Athaley
- Production companies: Lotus Visual Productions; Dark Stories; Moonweave Films; Taran Tantra Telefilms; Bridge PostWorks
- Distributed by: Spirit Media (India); Lotus Visual Productions (United Kingdom)
- Release dates: 26 January 2025 (Sundance); 19 September 2025 (India); 19 June 2026 (United Kingdom)
- Running time: 113 minutes
- Countries: India; Canada; United Kingdom
- Language: Marathi
- Box office: $11,500

Sabar Bonda (Marathi for 'Cactus Pears') is a 2025 romantic drama film written and directed by Rohan Parashuram Kanawade, in his feature directorial debut. It follows Anand (Bhushaan Manoj), a man from the city who returns to his hometown following a death in the family, and reconnects romantically with his childhood friend Balya (Suraaj Suman).

The film had its world premiere at the World Cinema Competition of the 2025 Sundance Film Festival on 26 January, where it won the Grand Jury Prize. It was the first Marathi-language film to premiere at the festival.

== Plot ==
Anand, a call-centre employee in his thirties, lives in Mumbai with his mother, Suman. After his father dies following an illness, Anand and Suman travel to the family's ancestral village in rural Maharashtra for the funeral and a ten-day mourning period. Their relatives instruct them to observe a series of customary restrictions. Anand participates in the rituals while coping with his father's death and the end of a recent relationship.

Suman knows that Anand is gay, but his sexuality is not discussed openly with their extended family. During the mourning period, relatives repeatedly ask why he remains unmarried and suggest prospective brides. Anand avoids answering their questions, while Suman attempts to redirect the conversations.

Anand reconnects with Balya, an unmarried childhood friend who works as a farmer and herds his family's animals. Balya also faces pressure from his parents and neighbours to marry. He begins taking Anand with him on his daily trips into the surrounding fields, allowing the two men to spend time away from their families. They discuss their lives, previous relationships and the expectations placed upon them. Their friendship develops into a romantic relationship.

Balya regularly visits Anand's family home, while Anand spends time with Balya's family. Remembering that Anand enjoyed cactus pears as a child, Balya collects the fruit, removes its thorns and sends it to him. Suman receives the gift and does not object to Balya's continued visits.

As the mourning period continues, Anand and Balya consider whether they can remain together after Anand returns to Mumbai. Balya proposes moving to the city and finding work there. His parents oppose his departure and refer to his responsibilities in the village. Anand is uncertain about making decisions while he is still grieving, but Balya remains determined to leave.

When relatives continue to disparage Anand for being unmarried, Suman defends him, noting that he cared for his father during his illness and fulfilled his responsibilities as a son. After the ceremonies are completed, Anand speaks with Balya, asking if he still wants to come with him to Mumbai. Suman tells Anand that she will stay with her father for a few days.

Anand and Balya return to Mumbai. Anand takes out the framed photo of his father and breaks down crying, Balya comforts him. In the final scene, Anand and Balya lie together facing each other on the floor of the home.

== Cast ==
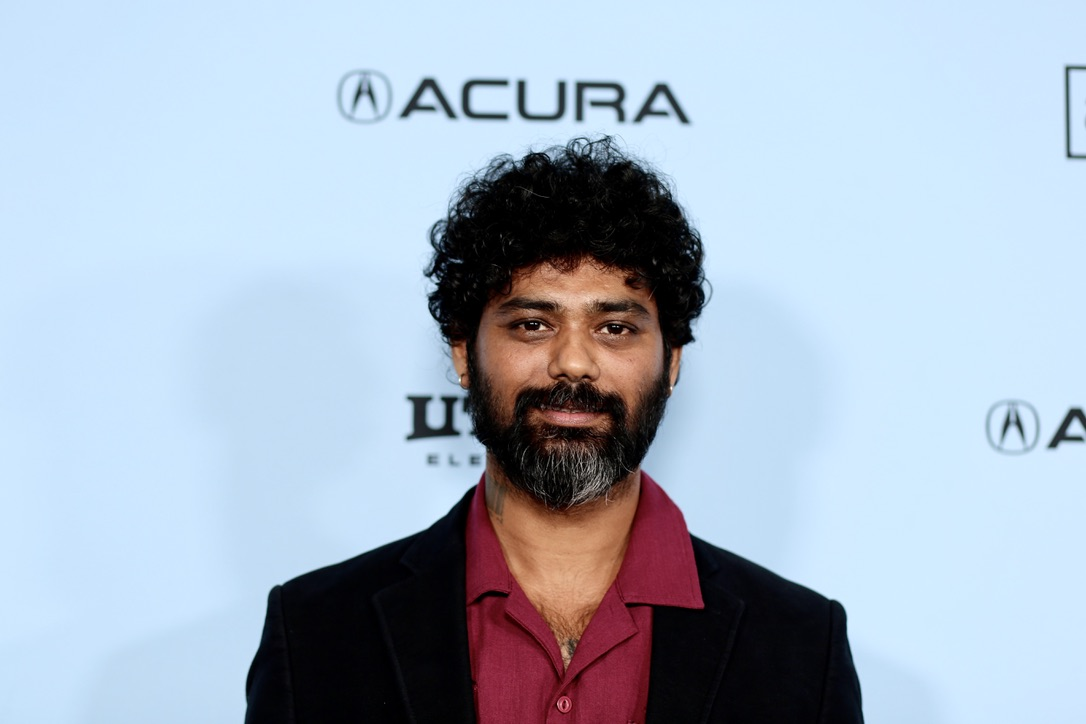
Rohan Parashuram Kanawade

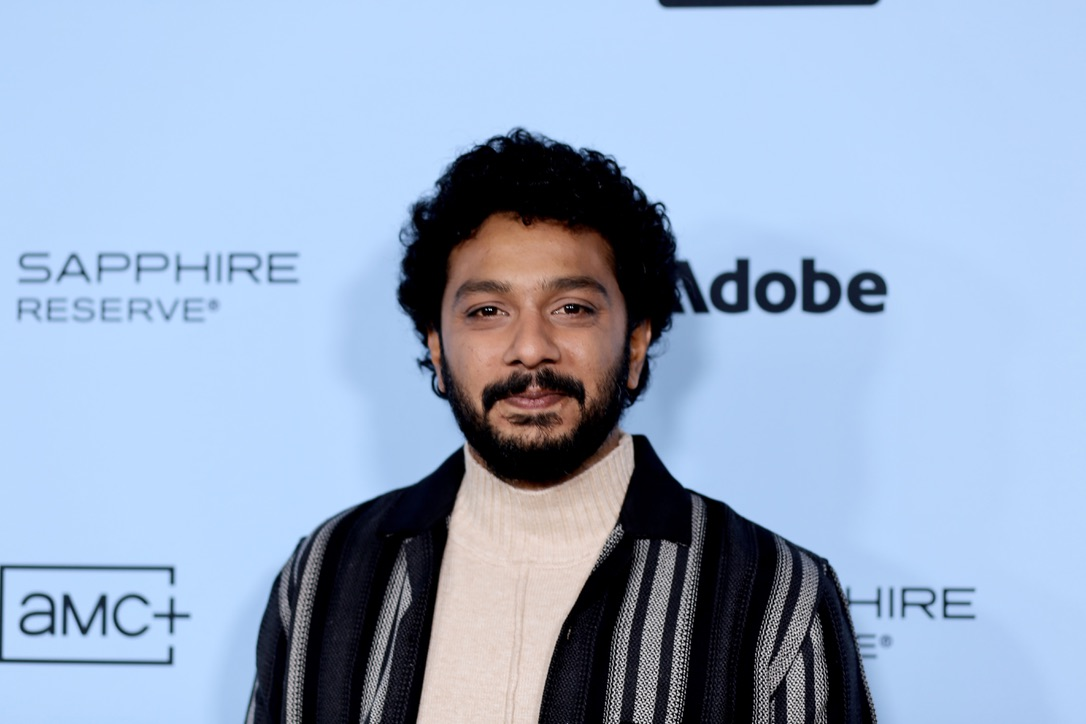
Bhushaan Manoj

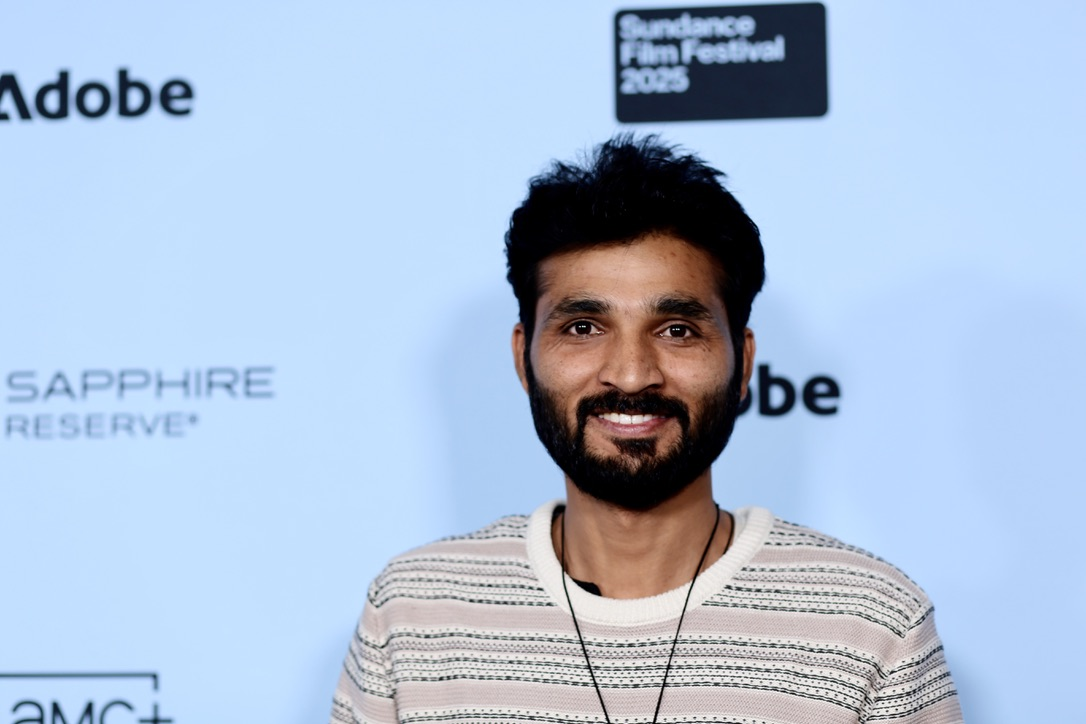
Suraaj Suman

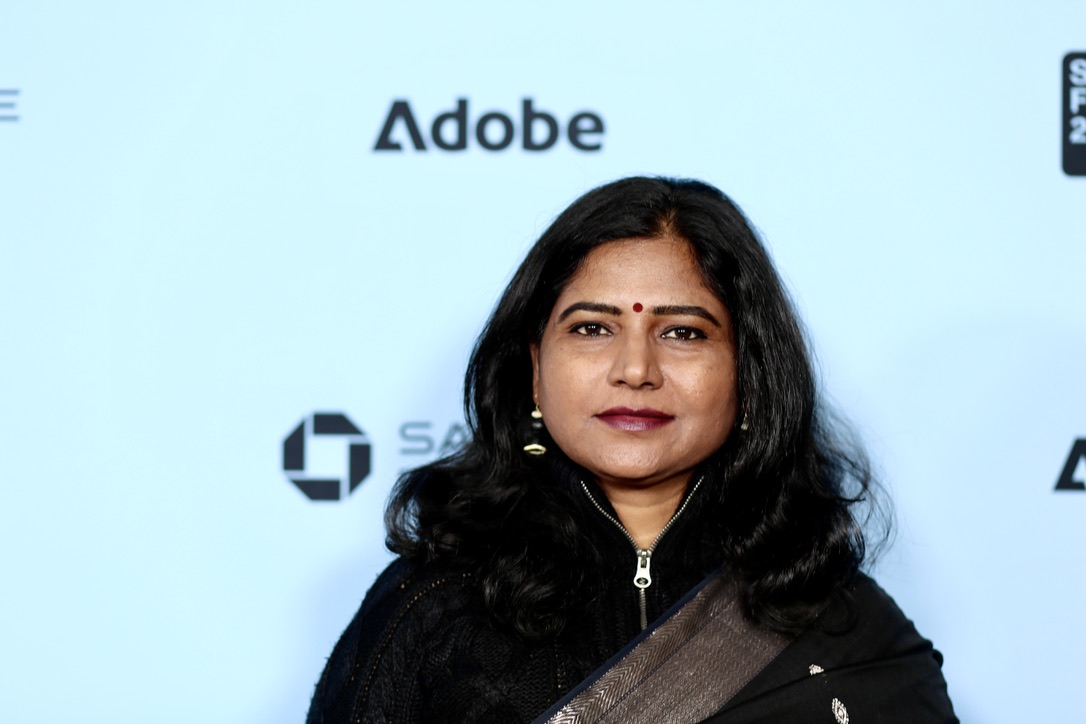
Jayshri Jagtap

- Bhushaan Manoj as Anand
- Suraaj Suman as Balya
- Jayshri Jagtap as Suman

== Release ==
Cactus Pears had its world premiere at the 2025 Sundance Film Festival on 26 January 2025 in the World Cinema Dramatic Competition section, in which it won the Grand Jury Prize Dramatic. It is also slated to screen at the 2025 Göteborg Film Festival. It was the closing film of the 2026 Sands Film Festival in St Andrews, UK.

The film was theatrically released in India on 19 September 2025. The film is scheduled to be released in the United Kingdom on 19 June 2026, by Lotus Visual Productions.

== Reception ==
On the review aggregator website Rotten Tomatoes, 95% of 40 critics' reviews are positive. The website's consensus reads: "Directed with a razor-sharp eye for character by Rohan Kanawade, Cactus Pears is an understated romance that gracefully pulls out the prickles from grief." Metacritic, which uses a weighted average, assigned the film a score of 85 out of 100, based on 9 critics, indicating "universal acclaim".

Wendy Ide of Screen Daily reviewed, "Cactus Pears is a subdued, sensitive study of bereavement and the quietly radical act of being queer in a rural, lower-class Indian community." IndieWire's Ritesh Mehra wrote that the film "is commendable in how it demonstrates the unique silent pains borne by many queer men who, despite their male privilege, have to fight to remain unattached (same sex marriage is illegal in India), to not be infantilized, and to realize relationships longer lasting than quick clandestine sex."

Tatsam Mukherjee at The Wire remarked "Kanawade’s film goes full monty, by addressing queer folks in Indian villages – places often even without the vocabulary for it. But it steers clear of the hostility and venom one might expect to arise from such a situation. Sabar Bonda, in fact, goes in the other direction by shining a light on the cowardice of society – especially while facing someone who owns their sexual identity."

The film won the Audience Award for narrative features, and Bhushaan Manoj won the award for Best Performance, at the 2025 Inside Out Film and Video Festival.
