= Aarpar =

2025 Indian film by Gaurav Patki

- Theatrical release poster
- Directed by: Gaurav Patki
- Written by: Gaurav Patki
- Produced by: Namdev N Katkar; Ritesh M. Chaudhari
- Starring: Lalit Prabhakar; Hruta Durgule
- Cinematography: Rahul Chauhan
- Edited by: Faizal Mahadik
- Music by: Gulraj Singh
- Production company: Leons Media Productions
- Distributed by: PVR Inox Pictures
- Release date: 12 September 2025
- Running time: 128 minutes
- Country: India
- Language: Marathi
- Box office: ₹1.64 crore

Aarpar (transl. This or that) is a 2025 Indian Marathi-language romantic drama film directed by Gaurav Patki. The film stars Lalit Prabhakar and Hruta Durgule in lead roles. The film received mixed reviews with praise towards the performances, cinematography & music but criticism towards the story.

== Cast ==
- Lalit Prabhakar as Amar Randive
- Hruta Durgule as Prachi Dixit
- Madav Abhyankar
- Suhita Thatte
- Snehalata Vasaikar
- Veenah Naair
- Janhavi Uday
- Manyuu Doshi

== Release ==
=== Theatrical ===
The film was released on 12 September 2025, clashing with Dashavatar and Bin Lagnachi Goshta.

=== Home media ===
The film was released on 7 November 2025 on Amazon Prime.

== Critical reception ==
Anub George of The Times of India gave the film 3 out of 5 stars, calling it "a well-paced and beautifully executed love story that examines the intricacies of romance under a microscope." Film Information described the film as "too routine" in its review.

Sakshi Jadhav of Saam TV noted that Aarpaar is not merely a love story, but an exploration that delves deep into the core of human relationships. She further remarked that for young audiences, the film offers a thought-provoking perspective on modern-day relationships.
