= April May 99 =

2025 Marathi film by Rohan Mapuskar

- Theatrical release poster
- Directed by: Rohan Mapuskar
- Written by: Rohan Mapuskar
- Produced by: Rajesh Mapuskar; Madhukar Kotian; Jogesh Bhutani; Maurice Noone
- Starring: Sajiri Joshi; Aaryan Menghji; Shreyas Thorat; Manthan Kanekar
- Cinematography: Apoorva Shaligram
- Edited by: Ninad Khanolkar
- Music by: Rohan-Rohan
- Production companies: Mapuskar Brothers; Fingerprint Films; Nexus Alliance; Think Tank
- Distributed by: AA Films; Sunshine Studios
- Release date: 23 May 2025
- Running time: 129 minutes
- Country: India
- Language: Marathi
- Box office: ₹1.24 crore

April May 99 is a 2025 Indian Marathi-language coming-of-age film directed by Rohan Mapuskar in his directorial debut. The film stars Sajiri Joshi, Aaryan Menghji, Shreyas Thorat, and Manthan Kanekar in lead roles, supported by an ensemble cast. Set in 1999 in Shrivardhan, a coastal village in Maharashtra's Konkan region, the film follows four teenagers whose friendships are tested during a transformative summer in the pre-digital era.

The film was theatrically released on 23 May 2025 and received positive reviews, with praise directed towards its performances, nostalgic themes, and setting.

== Plot ==
Set during the summer of 1999 in Shrivardhan, the film follows three 14-year-old friends—Krushna, Prasad, and Siddhesh—who look forward to their school vacation filled with cycling, games, and carefree exploration. Before the holidays begin, Prasad's father plans to send him to Mumbai for an English-language course, a decision Prasad and his friends strongly resist.

The boys’ plans change when Jaie, a girl from Pune visiting her aunt for the summer, arrives in the village. Prasad's father subsequently cancels the Mumbai plan on the condition that Jaie tutors Prasad in English during the vacation and that he assists her in adjusting to village life. Jaie's presence gradually alters the dynamics of the group, initially causing friction and resistance among the boys.

As the summer progresses, the four adolescents form an unexpected bond, and their interactions begin to test loyalties, challenge assumptions, and shape their emotional growth. Set in a pre-digital era, the film explores friendship, adolescence, and the fleeting innocence of youth through a season that proves transformative for all involved.

== Cast ==
- Sajiri Joshi as Jaie Khedekar
- Aaryan Menghji as Krushna Kamerkar
- Shreyas Thorat as Prasad Vichare
- Manthan Kanekar as Siddhesh Karde
- Ashutosh Gowariker as Jaie's father
- Raviraj Kande as Suresh Vichare
- Soumitra Pote as Prabhakar Kamerkar
- Gauri Kiran as Sushma Vichare
- Shubhangi Bhujbal as Shaila Kamerkar
- Saee Brahme as Shradha Kamerkar
- Smital Chavan as Chaya Tai
- Rajashree Potdar as Bhatin Kaku
- Dr. Pooja Wankhede as Pushpa Sansare
- Sumant Kelkar as Samadhan Sansare
- Ananda Karekar as Pradeep Karde
- Madhuri Bharti as Prachi Karde
- Pragya Dalvi as Swati Karde
- Akshata Kambli as Telma
- Yogesh Bandagale as Sada Mama
- Sanchita Joshi as Neema
- Sachin Kale as Nandu
- Prashant Madpuwar as Wagh Sir
- Gautam Berde as Dr. V. G. Joshi
- Anagha Kakade as Wagh Sir's Wife

== Production ==
=== Development ===
April May 99 marks the directorial debut of Rohan Mapuskar, a casting director with experience in Hindi and Marathi cinema. Mapuskar co-wrote the film with Bimal Oberoi and Kunal Pawar. The screenplay took approximately four years to develop, drawing significantly from Mapuskar's childhood experiences in Shrivardhan during the late 1990s. Discussing the writing process, Mapuskar stated that taking time to develop the screenplay was essential to maintaining authenticity, noting that personal experiences helped make the narrative feel more realistic. The decision to set the film in 1999 was intentional, as Mapuskar explained: "I wanted to show the transformation between the decades, the sense of what it was like to live in pre-digital times. There was barely anything like Video games. The village was still a village, unlike now."

=== Casting ===
The film features an ensemble cast selected by director Rohan Mapuskar. The four teenage protagonists: Aaryan Menghji, Shreyas Thorat, and Manthan Kanekar had previously appeared in films and television, while the film marked Sajiri Joshi's acting debut. Joshi was initially cast by Mapuskar in an earlier project that did not materialise. He later wrote the character of Jaie specifically for her, believing she possessed the presence and screen appeal required for the role.

=== Filming ===
Principal photography took place in 2024 in Shrivardhan, located in Maharashtra's Raigad district. Director Rohan Mapuskar, who moved from Shrivardhan to Mumbai in 2005, chose to return to his hometown to authentically capture the village's landscape and atmosphere. The film's Konkan setting forms an integral part of its narrative and contributes to its nostalgic tone.

== Music ==
The film's music was composed by Rohan–Rohan, while the background score was composed by Jerry Silvester Vincent.

Track listing
No.	Title	Lyrics	Singer(s)	Length
1.	"Mann Jaie"	Prashant Madpuwar, Rohan Pradhan	Sonu Nigam	4:34
2.	"Summer Holiday"	Prashant Madpuwar, Rohan Gokhale	Bhumi Pradhan, Rohan Pradhan	2:29
3.	"Takumba"	Prashant Madpuwar, Rohan Mapuskar	Rohan Pradhan, Rohan Gokhale, Rajshri Potdar	4:13
4.	"Mann Jaie – Sad Version"	Prashant Madpuwar, Rohan Pradhan	Rohan Pradhan, Bhumi Pradhan	3:37
Total length:				14:53

== Marketing and release ==
The film's official poster was unveiled in February 2025 by veteran Marathi director Rajdutt. The following month, the first teaser was released by Riteish Deshmukh. The first song from the film, "Takumba", set in a school environment and featuring the three teenage male leads, was subsequently released. In mid-April, a character teaser introducing Sajiri Joshi in the role of Jaie was unveiled. The trailer was released on 16 May 2025.

April May 99 was theatrically released on 23 May 2025, with English subtitles. A grand premiere of the film was held on 20 May 2025, attended by several notable personalities from the Indian film industry, including Sachin Khedekar, Madhu Chopra, Amruta Khanvilkar, Abhijit Panse, Sai Deodhar, and Mahima Makwana among others.

== Reception ==
=== Critical response ===
April May 99 received generally positive reviews from critics. Film Information described the film as a "breezy entertainer", praising its light-hearted tone, humour, performances, and heartfelt storytelling. Nandini Ramnath of Scroll.in called it "an irresistibly charming account of the comforts of the old clashing with the shock of the new", noting its nostalgic tone, characterisation, and performances.

Chaitali Joshi of Maharashtra Times awarded the film 3.5 out of 5 stars, writing that it "gives us a rewind button, takes us to that time and also gives us a lot of joy", and highlighting its depiction of 1990s childhood. Similarly, a review in Time Maharashtra echoed this sentiment, describing the film as one that "gives us that rewind button, takes us to that time and also gives us a lot of joy", while praising its portrayal of childhood memories, humour, performances, and the Konkan setting. Writing for Sakal, Santosh Bhingarde observed that April May 99 is "a film that makes us look into our past and beautifully captures the pure and innocent friendship of childhood." Meanwhile, Sameer Ahire of Movie Talkies rated the film 3 out of 5 stars, describing it as "a fun-filled revisit to childhood memories of summer holidays", while noting that despite its familiar narrative patterns, the film remains engaging due to its humour, performances, and nostalgic setting.

=== Accolades ===
Awards	Year	Category	Recipient	Result	Ref
Zee Chitra Gaurav Puraskar	2026	Best Breakthrough Debut Actress	Sajiri Joshi	Won	
MaTa Sanman	2026	Best Music Director	Rohan–Rohan	Nominated	
MaTa Sanman	2026	Best Lyricist	Prashant Madpuwar, Rohan Pradhan (Mann Jaie)	Nominated	
MaTa Sanman	2026	Best Playback Singer Male	Rohan Pradhan (Summer Holiday)	Nominated	
MaTa Sanman	2026	Fresh Face	Sajiri Joshi (combined with Baai Tujyapayi)	Won	
Sanskrutik Kaladarpan	2026	Best Film	April May 99	Pending	
Sanskrutik Kaladarpan	2026	Best Director	Rohan Mapuskar	Pending	
Sanskrutik Kaladarpan	2026	Best Story	Rohan Mapuskar	Pending	
Sanskrutik Kaladarpan	2026	Best Supporting Actor	Aaryan Mengji	Pending	
Sanskrutik Kaladarpan	2026	Best Supporting Actress	Rajashree Potdar	Pending	
Sanskrutik Kaladarpan	2026	Best Debut	Sajiri Joshi	Pending	
Sanskrutik Kaladarpan	2026	Best Dialogue	Rohan Mapuskar, Kunal Pawar	Pending	
Sanskrutik Kaladarpan	2026	Best Cinematogher	Apoorva Shaligram	Pending	
Sanskrutik Kaladarpan	2026	Best Editor	Ninad Khanolkar	Pending	
City Cine Awards Marathi	2026	Game Changer	Sajiri Joshi	Pending	
City Cine Awards Marathi	2026	Best Music Director	Rohan–Rohan	Pending	
