= List of Marathi films of 2025 =

This is a list of Marathi (Indian Marathi-language) that have either been released or scheduled to release in 2025.

== Box office collection ==
The highest-grossing Marathi films released in 2025, by worldwide box office gross revenue, are as follows:

*	Denotes film still running in cinemas

Highest worldwide gross of 2025
Rank	Title	Production company	Worldwide gross	Ref.
1	Dashavatar	Ocean Film Company; Ocean Art House	₹29 crore (US$3.0 million)	
2	Jarann	A & N Cinema’s LLP; A3 Event & Media Service	₹8 crore (US$830,000)–₹10 crore (US$1.0 million)	
3	SuSheela SuJeet	Panchsheel Entertainments; Big Brain Productions	₹8 crore (US$830,000)	
3	Gulkand	Everest Entertainment; Wetcloud Productions	₹8 crore (US$830,000)	
4	Ata Thambaycha Naay!	Chalk and Cheese Films; Film Jazz; Zee Studios	₹7.45 crore (US$770,000)	
5	Fussclass Dabhade	T-Series; Colour Yellow Productions; Chalchitra Mandalee	₹3.64 crore (US$380,000)	
6	Uttar	Zee Studios; Jackpot Entertainment	₹3 crore (US$310,000)	
7	Punha Shivajiraje Bhosale	The Great Maratha Entertainment; Satya-Sai Films; Krizolh Films; Zee Studios	₹2.78 crore (US$290,000)	
8	Sangeet Manapmaan	Jio Studios; Shree Ganesh Marketing and Films	₹2.59 crore (US$270,000)	
9	Zapuk Zupuk	Jio Studios	₹1.79 crore (US$190,000)	
10	Aarpar	Leons Media Productions	₹1.64 crore (US$170,000)	

== January–March ==
Opening		Title	Director	Cast	Ref.
J A N	1	Mu. Po. Bombilwaadi	Paresh Mokashi	Prashant Damle; Anand Ingle; Manmit Pem; Pranav Raorane; Vaibhav Mangle; Ritika Shrotri; Geetanjali Kulkarni; Sunil Abhyankar; Advait Dadarkar	
J A N	10	Sangeet Manapmaan	Subodh Bhave	Subodh Bhave; Sumeet Raghavan; Vaidehi Parshurami	
J A N	17	Mangla	Aparna Hoshing	Shivali Parab; Alka Kubal; Shashank Shende	
J A N	17	Jilabi	Nitin Kambale	Swapnil Joshi; Prasad Oak; Shivani Surve; Parna Pethe	
J A N	24	Mission Ayodhya	Sameer Ramesh Surve	Nilesh Deshpande; Tejaswi Patil; Dr. Abhay Kamat; Satish Pulekar; Guruvesh Pandit; Shravani Shinde; Sneha Shinde	
J A N	24	Fussclass Dabhade	Hemant Dhome	Kshitee Jog; Siddharth Chandekar; Amey Wagh	
J A N	31	Ilu Ilu 1998	Ajinkya Bapu Phalke	Elli AvrRam; Nishant Bhavsar; Meera Jagannath; Shrikant Yadav; Veena Jamkar	
J A N	31	Mukkam Post Devach Ghar	Sanket Mane	Myra Vaikul; Mangesh Desai; Usha Nadkarni; Sachin Narkar; Prathamesh Parab; Savita Malpekar	
F E B	7	Sa La Te Sa La Na Te	Santosh Kolhe	Sainkeet Kamat; Richa Agnihotri; Chhaya Kadam; Upendra Limaye	
F E B	7	Ek Radha Ek Meera	Mahesh Manjrekar	Gashmeer Mahajani; Mrunmayee Deshpande; Surbhi Bhosale	
F E B	7	Wahiwat	Sanjay Todkar	Raj Warak; Pranavi Patil	
F E B	28	ChikiChiki BooBoomBoom	Prasad Khandekar	Swwapnil Joshi; Prarthana Behere; Prajakta Mali; Prasad Khandekar; Vanita Kharat	
F E B	28	GauriShankar	Harekrishna Gowda	Harekrishna Gowda; Dakshina Rathod; Rahul Jagtap	
M A R	7	Sthal	Jayant Digambar Somalkar	Nandini Chikte; Taranath Khiratkar; Sangeeta Sonekar; Suyog Dhawas; Sandeep Somalkar	
M A R	14	From China With Love	Aniket Wagh	Aniket Wagh; Ankush Mandekar; Siddheshwar Zadbuke; Gayatri Bansode	
M A R	21	Hardik Shubhechha	Pushkar Jog	Pushkar Jog; Hemal Ingle	
M A R	21	Gaav Bolavato	Vinod Manikrao	Bhushan Pradhan; Madhav Abhyankar; Gauri Nalawade; Shrikant Yadav; Kiran Sharad	
M A R	21	Bhera	Shrikant Prabhakar	Deepak Joil; Shraddha Khanolkar; Pramod Koyande; Akanksha Khot	
M A R	21	Nayan	Ankush More	Siddhesh Pai; Monalisa Bagal; Suhas Palshikar; Anshumala Patil; Rina Liman; Ganesh Yadav, Deepak Shirke; Vijay Patkar; Pranav Raorane; Srinidhi Shetty	
M A R	21	RD	Ganesh Shinde	Ganesh Shinde; Avantika Kavathekar; Rahul Phaltankar	
M A R	21	Follower	Harshad Nalawade	Raghu Basarimarad; Donna Munshi; Harshad Nalawade	
M A R	28	Mi Pathishi Aahe	Parag Sawant	Saksham Kulkarni; Ashwini Chavare; Arun Nalawade; Suhas Paranjape	

== April–June ==
Opening		Title	Director	Cast	Ref.
A P R	10	Ashi Hi Jamva Jamvi	Lokesh Gupte	Ashok Saraf; Vandana Gupte	
A P R	11	Jay Bhim Panther	Nishant Natharam Dhapse	Milind Shinde; Shashank Shende; Jaywant Wadkar; Chinmay Udgirkar; Gaurav More; Abhijeet Chavan; Sonali Patil	
A P R	11	Institute of Pavtollogy	Prasad Namjoshi, Sagar Vanjari	Sayaji Shinde; Girish Kulkarni; Dilip Prabhavalkar; Deepti Devi; Parth Bhalerao	
A P R	18	SuSheela SuJeet	Prasad Oak	Swapnil Joshi; Sonali Kulkarni	
A P R	18	Sant Dnyaneshwaranchi Muktai	Digpal Lanjekar	Manas Bedekar; Ishmita Joshi; Sahil Dharmadhikari; Abhir Gore; Sameer Dharmadhikari; Mrinal Kulkarni; Ajay Purkar; Manoj Joshi	
A P R	25	Devmanus	Tejas Prabha Vijay Deoskar	Mahesh Manjrekar; Subodh Bhave; Renuka Shahane	
A P R	25	Zapuk Zupuk	Kedar Shinde	Suraj Chavan; Jui Bhagwat; Indraneil Kamat; Hemant Pharande; Pushkaraj Chirputkar; Milind Gawali	
M A Y	1	Ata Thambaycha Naay!	Shivraj Waichal	Bharat Jadhav; Siddharth Jadhav; Prajakta Hanamagar; Kiran Khoje; Praveen Dalimbkar; Om Bhutkar; Parna Pethe; Ashutosh Gowariker	
M A Y	1	Gulkand	Sachin Goswami	Prasad Oak; Sai Tamhankar; Samir Choughule; Esha Dey; Jui Bhagwat	
M A Y	9	Majhi Prarthana – Akalpaniya Prem Katha	Padmaraj Rajgopal Nair	Padmaraj Rajgopal Nair; Upendra Limaye	
M A Y	9	P. S. I. Arjun	Bhushan Patel	Ankush Chaudhari	
M A Y	9	26 November	Sachin Urade	Aniket Vishwasrao; Sayaji Shinde; Vijay Patkar	
M A Y	16	Banjara	Sneh Ponkshe	Sharad Ponkshe; Bharat Jadhav; Sunil Barve; Saksham Kulkarni; Sneh Ponkshe; Aditya Dhanraj	
M A Y	16	Khavis	Aniket Ghadage	Amruta Dhongade; Aniket Ghadage; Sameer Sakpal; Akshay Gaikwad; Nitesh Kamble; Hardik Joshi; Shweta Kharat	
M A Y	16	Posco 307	Swaroop Sawant	Swaroop Sawant; Amit Taware; Shashi Thosar; Divya Ghadge	
M A Y	23	Mangalashtaka Returns	Yogesh Pandurang Bhosale	Vrushabh Shah; Sheetal Ahirrao; Saksham Kulkarni; Prasad Oak; Sonal Pawar; Anad Ingale; Kamlesh Sawant; Sunil Godbole; Prasana Ketkar; Sameer Paulaste; Shweta Kharat; Prajakta Navnale; Bhakti Chavan; Sheetal Oswal	
M A Y	23	Vaama: Ladai Sanmanachi	Ashok Kondke	Kashmira Kulkarni; Ganesh Divekar; Mahesh Kumar	
M A Y	23	April May 99	Rohan Mapuskar	Sajiri Joshi; Aaryan Menghji; Shreyas Thorat; Manthan Kanekar	
M A Y	23	Tu Me Ani Amaira	Lokesh Gupte	Sai Godbole; Ajinkya Deo; Pooja Sawant; Rajeshwari Sachdev; Atul Parchure	
M A Y	30	Mhanje Waghache Panje	Swaroop Sawant	Saurabh Gokhale; Nikhil Chavan; Tamanna Bandekar; Sanjay Narvekar; Deepali Sayyed; Chinmay Udgirkar; Prajakta Hanamghar	
M A Y	30	Ashtapadi	Uttkarsh Jain	Santosh Juvekar; Mayuri Kapadane; Abhinay Patekar	
M A Y	30	Dharmarakshak Ahilyadevi Holkar Ek Yug	Sushant Sonawale	Ashwini Mahangade; Anil Nagarkar; Suresh Vishwakarma	
M A Y	30	Mawaali	Sanjay Niranjan	Prakash Dhotre; Ashish Warang; Gavie Chahal; Deepshikha Nagpal	
J U N	6	Jarann	Hrishikesh Gupte	Amruta Subhash; Anita Date; Vikram Gaikwad; Jyoti Malshe; Seema Deshmukh; Rajan Bhise; Kishor Kadam; Avanee Joshi	
J U N	13	Ambat Shaukin	Nikhil Wairagar	Pooja Sawant; Prarthana Behere; Amey Wagh; Bhau Kadam; Parth Bhalerao; Abhijeet Khandkekar; Akshay Tanksale; Monalisa Bagal; Kiran Gaikwad; Gautami Patil	
J U N	13	Shaatir: The Beginning	Sunil Vaykar	Yogesh Soman; Reshma Vaykar; Mir Sarwar; Ramesh Pardeshi; Anil Nagarkar	
J U N	13	Nibaar	Sunilji Shinde	Shashank Ketkar; Sayali Sanjeev; Shashank Shende; Devika Daftardar; Arun Nalawade	
J U N	20	Samsara	Sagar Ladhe	Sayali Sanjeev; Rishi Saxena; Pushkar Shrotri; Girish Oak; Nandita Dhuri; Priyadarshini Indalkar; Tanishka Visheh; Yashraj Dimbule; Kailash Waghmare; Sakshi Gandhi	
J U N	27	Sajana	Shashikant Dhotre	Akash Sarvgod; Trupti More	
J U N	27	All Is Well	Yogesh Jadhav	Priyadarshan Jadhav; Abhinay Berde; Rohit Haldikar; Sayaji Shinde; Abhijit Chavan; Nakshatra Medhekar; Sayali Phatak; Madhav Vaze; Ajay Jadhav; Amyra Goswami; Disha Katkar	

== July–September ==
Opening		Title	Director	Cast	Ref.
J U L	4	Gaadi Number 1760	Yogiraj Gaikwad	Prathamesh Parab; Priyadarshini Indalkar; Shubhankar Tawde; Suhas Joshi; Shashank Shende	
J U L	18	Ye Re Ye Re Paisa 3	Sanjay Jadhav	Sanjay Narvekar; Siddharth Jadhav; Umesh Kamat; Tejaswini Pandit; Vishakha Subhedar; Anand Ingle; Nagesh Bhosale; Vanita Kharat; Jaywant Wadkar	
J U L	25	Dhaap	Yogesh Gadage	Yogesh Gadage; Kiran Sgejal; Ketan Pawar; Madhav Abhyankar; Sunil Godbole	
A U G	1	Avakarika	Arvind Bhosale	Virat Madke; Peeya Kosumbkar; Rohit Pawar; Rahul Phalatankar	
A U G	1	Parinati	Akshay Balsaraf	Amruta Subhash; Sonalee Kulkarni; Akshar Kothari	
A U G	1	Mumbai Local	Abhijeet	Prathamesh Parab; Dnyanada Ramtirthkar	
A U G	8	Satyabhama A Forgotten Saga	Sarang Pekhale; Abhijeet Zadgaonkar	Madhav Abhyankar; Abhijit Amkar; Bhavika Nikam; Jyoti Patil; Sarang Manoj; Dnyaneshwar Shinde	
A U G	8	Jitraab	Tanaji M Ghadge	Suhas Palshikar; Parth Bhalerao; Shivali Parab; Bharat Ganeshpure	
A U G	8	Vaajav Re	Jay Kamlesh Rathod	Santosh Juvekar; Gaurav More; Tanvi Shinde	
A U G	22	Better Half Chi Love Story	Sanjay Amar	Subodh Bhave; Rinku Rajguru; Prarthana Behere; Aniket Vishwasrao	
A U G	22	Hello Kadam	Akash Asha Nitinchandra	Adhish Paigude; Shweta Kamat; Suraj Somvanshi; Pranjali Kanzarkar	
S E P	12	Dashavatar	Subodh Khanolkar	Dilip Prabhavalkar; Bharat Jadhav; Abhinay Berde; Priyadarshini Indalkar; Sidharth Menon; Mahesh Manjrekar	
S E P	12	Aarpar	Gaurav Patki	Lalit Prabhakar; Hruta Durgule	
S E P	12	Bin Lagnachi Goshta	Aditya Ingle	Priya Bapat; Umesh Kamat; Girish Oak; Nivedita Saraf	
S E P	13	Payavatachi Savali	Munnawar Shamim Bhagat	Vije Bhatia; Shalvi Shah; Revati Iyyer; Prasad Mali; Shital Bhosale	
S E P	19	Aatli Baatmi Futli	Vishal P. Gandhi	Rohini Hattangadi; Mohan Agashe; Siddharth Jadhav	
S E P	19	Kurla To Vengurla	Vijay Kalamkar	Pralhad Kudtarkar; Veena Jamkar; Vaibhav Mangle	
S E P	19	Aranya	Amol Digambar Karambe	Hardeek Joshi; Veena Jagtap; Hritika Patil; Vijay Nikam; Suresh Vishwakarma; Chetan Chavda	
S E P	19	Sabar Bonda	Rohan Parashuram Kanawade	Bhushan Manoj; Suraaj Suman; Jayshri Jagtap	
S E P	19	Zing	Amit Koli	Shashank Shende; Rohit Chavan	
S E P	19	Tango Malhar	Saya Date	Nitesh Kamble; Kirti Vishwanathan; Seema Vartak; Akshay Gaikwad; Manish Dharmani; Manisha Mahaldar; Sandesh Suryavanshi; Pankaj Sonawane	
S E P	25	Chhabi	Advait Masurkar	Sameer Dharmadhikari; Makarand Deshpande; Dhruv Chedda; Anagha Atul	

== October–December ==
Opening		Title	Director	Cast	Ref.
O C T	2	Vadapav	Prasad Oak	Abhinay Berde; Gauri Nalawade; Prasad Oak; Savita Prabhune	
O C T	10	Sakaal Tar Hou Dya	Alok Jain	Subodh Bhave; Manasi Naik	
O C T	10	Tu Bol Na	Mrunmayee Deshpande	Mrunmayee Deshpande; Rahul Pethe; Pushkaraj Chirputkar; Karan Parab; Suvrat Joshi; Siddharth Menon; Leena Bhagwat	
O C T	22	Premachi Goshta 2	Satish Rajwade	Lalit Prabhakar; Ridhima Pandit; Rucha Vaidya; Swapnil Joshi; Bhalchandra Kadam	
O C T	31	Punha Shivajiraje Bhosale	Mahesh Manjrekar	Siddharth Bodke; Payal Jadhav; Vikram Gaikwad; Prithvik Pratap; Mangesh Desai; Treesha Thosar; Siddharth Jadhav; Vijay Nikam	
O C T	31	Well Done Aai	Shankar Dhulgude	Vishakha Subhedar; Vijay Nikam; Dattu More; Jaywant Wadkar	
O C T	31	Tu Maza Kinara	Christus Stephen	Bhushan Pradhan; Ketaki Narayan; Keya Ingle	
N O V	7	Abhanga Tukaram	Digpal Lanjekar	Yogesh Soman; Smita Shewale; Sameer Dharmadhikari; Mrinal Kulkarni; Ajay Purkar; Nikhil Raut; Sachin Bhilare; Abhijit Shwetchandra; Virajas Kulkarni; Ajinkya Raut	
N O V	7	Teen Payacha Ghoda	Noopur Bora	Ria Nalavade; Kunal Shukla; Avinash Londhe; Devika Daftardar; Gajanan Paranjape	
N O V	7	Kadhipatta	Vishwaa	Bhushan Patil; Riddhi Kumar; Akshay Tanksale; Sanjay Mone; Shubhangi Gokhale	
N O V	14	Gondhal	Santosh Davkhar	Kishor Kadam; Ishita Deshmukh; Yogesh Sohoni; Anuj Prabhu; Kailash Waghmare; Madhavi Juvekar; Suresh Vishwakarma	
N O V	14	Reel Star	Simmy and Robin	Prasad Oak; Bhushan Manjule; Urrmela J Jagtap; Milind Shinde; Kailash Waghmare	
N O V	14	Sargam	Shiv Kadam	Rutvik Kendre; Disha Pardeshi; Sumeet Pusavale; Yatin Karyekar	
N O V	21	Smart Sunbai	Yogesh Doltade	Santosh Juvekar; Bhau Kadam; Kishori Shahane; Mohan Joshi, Deepak Shirke; Rohan Patil	
N O V	21	Asambhav	Sachit Patil	Sachit Patil; Mukta Barve; Priya Bapat; Sandeep Kulkarni	
N O V	21	Last Stop Khanda	Vineet Parulekar	Shramesh Betkar; Juilee Temkar; Prabhakar More	
N O V	21	Uut	Ram Mallik	Raj Misal; Arya Save	
N O V	28	Taath Kana	Girish Mohite	Umesh Kamat; Sayali Sanjeev; Suyog Gorhe; Shailesh Datar; Deepti Devi; Anupama Takmoge	
N O V	28	Asa Mee Ashi Mee	Amol Shetge	Ajinkya Deo; Tejashri Pradhan	
N O V	28	Nirdhar	Dilip Bhopale	Girish Oak; Saurabh Gogate; Pallavi Patwardhan; Milind Uke; Pragya Kelkar; Dinanath Walawalkar	
D E C	5	Asurvan	Sachin Ambat	Dipti Dhotre; Suraj Nevrekar; Anuj Thakare; Vishwas Patil; Vipul Salunkhe; Vinayak Chavan	
D E C	12	Uttar	Kshitij Patwardhan	Renuka Shahane; Abhinay Berde; Hruta Durgule; Nirmiti Sawant	
D E C	12	Kairee	Shantanu Rode	Sayali Sanjeev; Subodh Bhave; Siddharth Jadhav	
D E C	19	Asha	Deepak Patil	Rinku Rajguru; Sainkeet Kamat; Usha Naik	
D E C	19	Khalid Ke Shivaji	Raj More	Krish More - Priydarshan Jadhav - Bharat Ganeshpure - Sushma Deshpande - Kailash Waghmare - Snehalata Tagde	
D E C	26	Gotya Gangster	Rajesh Pinjani	Prathamesh Parab; Pravin Tarde; Mohan Agashe; Shrikant Yadav; Ashwini Giri; Vinod Vanve; Bhushan Manjule; Aishwarya Shinde	
D E C	26	Savitri Kalyugatali	Pyarelal Sharma	Pavan Choure; Mahak Shekh; Jairaj Nayar; Sweta Bhamre	

== See also ==
- List of Marathi films of 2026
- List of Marathi films of 2024
