= List of Marathi films of 2024 =

This is a list of Marathi (Indian Marathi-language) that have either been released or scheduled to release in 2024.

== Box office collection ==
The List of highest-grossing Marathi films released in 2024, by worldwide box office gross revenue, are as follows.

The rank of the films in the following depends on the worldwide gross.

*	Denotes films still running in cinemas worldwide

The highest worldwide gross of 2024
Rank	Title	Studio(s)	Worldwide gross	Ref
1	Nach Ga Ghuma	Hiranyagarbha Manoranjan	₹27.03 Crore	
2	Navra Maza Navsacha 2	Sushriya Chitra	₹25 Crore	
3	Dharmaveer 2	Zee Studios; Sahil Motion Arts	₹15.47 - ₹16.32 Crore	
4	Juna Furniture	Satya Saiee Films; Skylink Entertainment	₹14 Crore	
5	Shivrayancha Chhava	Malhar Picture Company	₹14 Crore	
6	Dharmarakshak Mahaveer Chhatrapati Sambhaji Maharaj: Chapter 1	Urvita Productions	₹11.90 - ₹12.70 Crore	
7	Ole Aale	Coconut Motion Pictures	₹8.57 Crore	
8	Phullwanti	Panorama Studios; Mangesh Pawar & Company; Shivoham Creations Pvt. Ltd	₹6.70 Crore	
9	Chhatrapati Sambhaji	Perfect Plus Entertainment; FIF Production; AJ Media Corp.	₹5.45 Crore	
10	Gharat Ganpati	Navigns Studio; Panorama Studios	₹4.75 Crore	
11	Alyad Palyad	SMP Productions	₹4.43 Crore	

== January – March ==
Opening		Title	Director	Cast	Ref.
J A N	5	Ole Aale	Vipul Mehta	Nana Patekar; Siddharth Chandekar; Sayali Sanjeev; Makarand Anaspure	
J A N	5	Panchak	Jayant Jathar, Rahul Awate	Adinath Kothare; Dilip Prabhavalkar; Tejashri Pradhan; Bharati Achrekar	
J A N	5	Satyashodhak	Nilesh Jalamkar	Sandeep Kulkarni; Rajshri Deshpande	
J A N	12	Khurchi	Shiv Mane, Santosh Hagavane	Akshay Waghmare; Raqesh Bapat	
J A N	19	8 Don 75	Sushrut Bhagwat	Shubhankar Tawde; Sanskruti Balgude	
J A N	19	Aaichya Gavat Marathi Bol	Omi Vaidya	Omi Vaidya; Sanskruti Balgude; Parth Bhalerao	
J A N	26	Saapala	Nikhil Lanjekar	Chinmay Mandlekar; Sameer Dharmadhikari; Neha Joshi; Dipti Ketkar	
J A N	26	Navardev Bsc. Agri	Ram Khatmode	Kshitish Date; Priyadarshini Indalkar; Makarand Anaspure; Gargi Phule; Ramesh Pardeshi; Hardik Joshi; Neha Shitole; Sandeep Pathak	
F E B	2	Musafiraa	Pushkar Jog	Pushkar Jog; Pooja Sawant; Smrity Sinha; Disha Pardeshi; Pushkaraj Chirputkar	
F E B	2	Sur Lagu De	Pravin Eknath Birje	Vikram Gokhale; Suhashini Mulay; Reena Madhukar	
F E B	2	Chhatrapati Sambhaji	Rakesh Subesingh Dulgaj	Shashank Udapurkar; Pramod Pawar; Rajit Kapur; Dalip Tahil; Mrinal Kulkarni; Mohan Joshi	
F E B	2	Sridevi Prasanna	Vishal Modhave	Sai Tamhankar; Siddharth Chandekar	
F E B	2	Gaafil	Milind Ashok Dhoke	Aditya Raj; Vaishnavi Barde; Rajsi Takale; Nikhil Bahaddarpure	
F E B	9	Delivery Boy	Mohsin Khan	Prathamesh Parab; Prithvik Pratap; Ankita Landepatil; Shreya Kulkarni	
F E B	9	Lokshahi	Sanjay Amar	Tejashree Pradhan; Mohan Agashe; Sameer Dharmadhikari; Bhargavi Chirmule; Ankit Mohan; Girish Oak	
F E B	16	Shivrayancha Chhava	Digpal Lanjekar	Rahul Dev; Sameer Dharmadhikari; Mrinal Kulkarni; Bhushan Patil	
F E B	16	Locha Copycha	Akshay Sutar	Pravin Bhabal; Shraddha Kattimani; Navin Kadam; Omkar Kamble	
F E B	23	Aata Vel Zaali	Ananth Mahadevan	Dilip Prabhavalkar; Rohini Hattangadi	
M A R	1	Lagna Kallol	Mohammed Burma, Mayur Tirmakhe	Siddhartha Jadhav; Bhushan Pradhan; Mayuri Deshmukh	
M A R	1	Hi Anokhi Gaath	Mahesh Manjrekar	Shreyas Talpade; Gauri Ingawale	
M A R	1	Danga	Rameez Raja Murtuza, Vishal Patil	Nagesh Bhosale; Manini Durge	
M A R	1	Man Yedyagat Zala	Yogesh Jadhav	Sumedh Mudgalkar; Swanandi Berde	
M A R	8	Kanni	Sameer Joshi	Hruta Durgule; Shubhankar Tawde; Ajinkya Raut; Vallari Viraj; Rishi Manohar	
M A R	8	Amaltash	Suhas Desale	Rahul Deshpande; Pallavi Paranjape	
M A R	8	Terav	Harish Ethape	Sandeep Pathak; Kiran Khoje; Kiran Mane; Neha Dandale	
M A R	8	Lockdown Lagna	Sumit Sanghamitra	Hardeek Joshi; Pravin Tarde; Pritam Kagne; Prajakta Gaikwad; Kshitish Date	
M A R	8	Bhagirathi Missing	Sachin Wagh	Shilpa Thakre; Abhishek Avachat; Suresh Vishwakarma; Pooja Pawar Salunkhe	
M A R	15	Unn Sawali	Diwakar Naaik	Bhushan Pradhan; Shivani Surve; Ajinkya Nanaware	
M A R	15	Shishyavrutti	Akhil Desai	Dushyant Wagh; Nikita Patil; Rudra Dhore; Kamlesh Sawant; Uday Sabnis; Anshuman Vichare; Aniket Kelkar; Prashant Nagare	
M A R	22	Morrya	Jitendra Barde	Umesh Jagtap; Jitendra Barde; Sanjay Bhadane	
M A R	22	Janma Runn	Kanchan Adhikari	Manoj Joshi; Niharica Raizada; Sukanya Kulkarni; Anagha Bhagare; Sushant Shelar	
M A R	29	Alibaba Aani Chalishitale Chor	Aditya Ingale	Subodh Bhave; Mukta Barve; Atul Parchure; Anand Ingale; Madhura Welankar; Umesh Kamat; Shruti Marathe	

== April – June ==
Opening		Title	Director	Cast	Ref.
A P R	19	MyLek	Priyanka Tanwar	Sonali Khare; Sanayaah Anand; Umesh Kamat	
A P R	19	Rajkaran Gela Mishit	Makarand Anaspure	Makarand Anaspure; Prajakta Hanamghar Prakash Bhagwat	
A P R	26	Juna Furniture	Mahesh Manjrekar	Mahesh Manjrekar; Medha Manjrekar; Bhushan Pradhan; Anusha Dandekar; Sachin Khedekar	
A P R	26	Lek Asavi Tar Ashi	Vijay Kondke	Gargi Datar; Yatin Karyekar; Shubhangi Gokhale; Kamlesh Sawant; Surekha Kudchi; Abhijeet Chavan; Nayana Apte; Onkar Bhojane; Savita Malpekar	
A P R	26	Parampara	Pranay Nishakant Telang	Milind Shinde; Veena Jamkar; Janardhan Parab; Machindra Gadkar; Prakash Dhotre; Prashant Neman; Kishor Ravrane; Arun Kadam; Jayraj Nayar	
M A Y	1	Naach Ga Ghuma	Paresh Mokashi	Mukta Barve; Namrata Sambherao; Sukanya Kulkarni; Sarang Sathaye; Supriya Pathare; Myra Vaikul	
M A Y	1	Swargandharva Sudhir Phadke	Yogesh Deshpande	Sunil Barve; Mrunmayee Deshpande; Sukhada Khandkekar; Sharad Ponkshe; Avinash Narkar; Milind Pathak	
M A Y	3	Rudra	Ashok Kamle, Sunil Motwani	Siddhant More; Apurva Kawade; Pradeep Rawat; Deepali Sayed; Thakur Anoop Singh; Nishigandha Wad; Madhuri Pawar; Veena Jagtap	
M A Y	10	Apsara	Chandrakant Pawar	Vitthal Kale; Megha Ghadge; Shashank Shende; Vijay Nikam; Sachin Kumavat, Rajesh Bhosale, Suyash Zunjurke, Mayuri Avhad	
M A Y	10	Manomani	Sanjay Deokar	Rohit Parshuram; Pranjali Kajharkar; Supriti Shivalkar; Milind Jadhav; Sanjay Deokar; Chaitrali Jadhav	
M A Y	17	Karmavirayan	Dhananjay Bhavalekar	Kishor Kadam; Suhas Shirsat; Upendra Limaye; Devika Daftardar; Usha Naik	
M A Y	17	Bhundis	Vaibhav Supekar	Bharat Shinde; Yashraj Dimbale; Rambhau Jagtap; Manik Kale; Ashutosh Wadekar; Ashwin Tambe	
M A Y	24	Kaasra	Vikas Vilas Misaal	Janmejay Telang; Tanvi Sawant; Smita Tambe; Ram Pawar; Prakash Dhotre; Ganesh Yadav; Dr. Vandana Patel; Vishal Arjun; Kunal Suman	
M A Y	24	Dear Love	Amarnath Kharade, Rushikesh Turai	Amarnath Kharade; Kiran Dhane	
M A Y	24	Shaktiman	Prakash Kunte	Adinath Kothare; Spruha Joshi; Ishan Kunte	
M A Y	31	Hoy Maharaja	Shailesh Shetty	Prathamesh Parab; Sandeep Pathak; Abhijeet Chavan; Samir Choughule; Vaibhav Mangle	
J U N	7	Malhar (Note: Simultaneously released in Hindi.)	Vishal Kumbhar	Shrinivas Pokale; Vinayak Potdar; Sharib Hashmi; Anjali Patil	
J U N	14	Alyad Palyad	Pritam SK Patil	Gaurav More; Makarand Deshpande; Saksham Kulkarni; Bhagyam Jain; Anushka Pimputkar	
J U N	14	Sangharsh Yoddha Manoj Jarange Patil	Shivaji Doltade	Rohan Patil; Mohan Joshi; Sandeep Pathak; Sagar Karande; Arbaz Shaikh	
J U N	14	Bara Varsha Saha Mahine	Ashirwad T. Pipare	Vijay Patkar; Tanvi Ganjawala; Shreehari Abhyankar	
J U N	14	Soham	Pundalik Yashoda Laxman Dhumal	Suhas Palshikar; Pankaj Vishnu; Jyoti Nimse; Mansi Kulkarni	
J U N	21	Gaabh	Anup Jatratkar	Kailash Waghmare; Sayali Bandkar	
J U N	21	Jhaad	Sachin Bansidhar Doiphode	Dilip Doiphode; Prakash Dhotre; Sandeep Waybase; Shivlingappa Bembalkar	
J U N	21	Vitthala Tuch	Prafulla Maske	Supreet Nikam; Usha Bhide; Yogesh Jamaa; Mohan Joshi	
J U N	21	A Valentine's Day	Roheet Rao Narsinge	Ashwini Kulkarni; Suresh Vishwakarma; Sanjay Khapare; Arun Kadam; Abhijeet Chavan	

== July – September ==
Opening		Title	Director	Cast	Ref.
J U L	5	Vishay Hard	Sumit Patil	Parna Pethe; Sumit Patil; Hasan Sheikh; Vipin Borate; Pratap Sonale	
J U L	5	Aamhi Jarange	Yogesh Bhosale	Makarand Deshpande; Ajay Purkar; Prasad Oak; Subodh Bhave; Vijay Nikam; Bhushan Patil	
J U L	12	Bai Ga	Pandurang Jadhav	Swapnil Joshi; Sukanya Mone; Prarthana Behere; Aditi Sarangdhar; Deepti Devi; Namrata Gaikwad; Neha Khan	
J U L	12	Rangada	Ayub Hawaldar	Bhushan Shivtare; Amol Lanke; Rajendra Gunjal; Mayuri Navhate; Pallavi Kumbhar	
J U L	12	Yaari	Chetan Sagade	Pavan Choure; Apeksha Chavan; Arbaz Shaikh; Dhananjay Patale; Ghansham Darode; Pushpa Chaudhari; Sunil Godbole; Pranjali Pawar; Anuradha Doke; Vaishnavi Janrao; Yash Patil; Tanishka Chavan	
J U L	19	Danka Hari Namacha	Shreyash Jadhav	Aniket Vishwasrao; Priyadarshan Jadhav; Kiran Gaikwad; Sayaji Shinde; Rasika Sunil; Akshaya Gurav; Kabir Singh Duhan; Nikhil Chavan; Avinash Narkar; Mahesh Jadhav; Mayur Pawar; Kiran Bhalerao	
J U L	19	Ek Don Teen Chaar	Varun Narvekar	Nipun Dharmadhikari; Vaidehi Parashurami	
J U L	26	Gharat Ganpati	Navjyot Narendra Bandiwadekar	Nikita Dutta; Bhushan Pradhan; Ajinkya Deo; Ashwini Bhave; Sanjay Mone; Shubhangi Latkar; Shubhangi Gokhale	
J U L	26	Google Aai	Govind Varaha	Pranav Raorane; Prajakta Gaikwad; Saee Rewadikar; Madhav Abhyankar	
A U G	2	Raghu 350	Ashish Madke	Vijay Gite; Chinmay Udgirkar; Tanaji Galgunde; Sanjay Khapare; Shivraj Walvekar	
A U G	2	Life Line	Saahil Shirwaikar	Madhav Abhyankar; Ashok Saraf; Bharat Dabhodkar; Hemangi Kavi; Jaywant Wadkar	
A U G	2	Babu	Mayur Shinde	Ankit Mohan; Neha Mahajan; Ruchira Jadhav; Smita Tambe; Sanjay Khapare	
A U G	23	Raghuveer	Nilesh Kunjir	Vikram Gaikwad; Rujuta Deshmukh; Navin Prabhakar; Shailesh Datar; Rahul Mehendale; Vignesh Joshi; Ninad Kulkarni; Bhushan Telang; Varsha Dandale; Mausumi Tondwalkar; Anushree Phadnis; Dev Nikharge; Ganesh Mane	
A U G	23	Yuvaneta	Yogesh Ramesh Jadhav	Ankur Kshirsagar; Sanjay Khapre; Kamlesh Sawant; Madhav Abhyankar; Teja Deokar; Mira Jagannath; Milind Jadhav	
A U G	30	Neta Geeta	Sudhanshu Budukh	Shivani Baokar; Sudhanshu Budukh	
S E P	6	Shriyut Non Maharashtrian	Ajinkya Upasani	Gaurav Upasani; Sayali Vaidya; Atharva Deshpande; Sampada Gaikwad; Vaibhav Randhawe; Sarvesh Joshi	
S E P	13	Fauji	Ghanshyam Yede	Saurabh Gokhale; Prajakta Gaikwad; Ashwini Kasar; Pragnya Nayan; Janvhi Vyas; Manjusha Khatri	
S E P	20	Navra Maza Navsacha 2	Sachin Pilgaonkar	Sachin Pilgaonkar; Supriya Pilgaonkar; Swapnil Joshi; Hemal Ingle; Ashok Saraf; Siddharth Jadhav; Vaibhav Mangle; Nirmiti Sawant; Santosh Pawar	
S E P	27	Dharmaveer 2	Pravin Tarde	Prasad Oak; Kshitish Date; Makarand Date; Snehal Tarde	
S E P	27	Ghaath	Chhatrapal Ninawe	Jitendra Joshi; Milind Shinde; Suruchi Adarkar	

== October – December ==
Opening		Title	Director	Cast	Ref.
O C T	4	Ek Daav Bhutacha	Sandeep Manohar Naware	Makarand Anaspure; Siddharth Jadhav; Nagesh Bhonsle; Akshay Kulkarni; Harshad Naybal; Mayuri Deshmukh; Ashwini Kulkarni; Nandini Vaidya; Varsha Dandale	
O C T	10	Yek Number	Rajesh Mapuskar	Tejaswini Pandit; Dhairya Gholap; Sayli Patil	
O C T	11	Phullwanti	Snehal Pravin Tarde	Prajakta Mali; Gashmeer Mahajani	
O C T	18	Like Aani Subscribe	Abhishek Merukar	Amey Wagh; Amruta Khanvilkar; Jui Bhagwat	
O C T	18	Paani	Adinath Kothare	Adinath Kothare; Subodh Bhave; Kishor Kadam; Girish Joshi; Kunal Gajbhare; Shripad Joshi; Rucha Vaidya	
O C T	18	Raja Rani	Shivaji Doltade	Rohan Patil; Vaishnavi Shinde	
O C T	25	Karmayogi Abasaheb	Altaf Dadasaheb Shaikh	Aniket Vishwasrao; Hardik Joshi; Devika Daftardar; Prithvik Pratap; Vijay Patkar; Pradeep Velankar; Tanaji Galgunde	
O C T	25	The A.I. Dharma Story	Pushkar Jog	Pushkar Jog; Deepti Lele; Smita Gondkar	
O C T	25	Gaarud	Pratap Vitthalrao Sonale	Girish Kulkarni; Shashank Shende; Payal Pande; Sachin Valanju; Dhananjay Sardesh Pande	
N O V	8	Hya Goshtila Navach Nahi	Sandeep Sawant	Jaideep Kodolikar; Prathamesh Atre; Chaitanya Khebekar; Anuradha Dhamane; Avadhoot Potdar; Seema Makote; Pratikas Khasnis	
N O V	8	Mushak Aakhyan	Makarand Anaspure	Makarand Anaspure; Bharat Sawale; Prakash Bhagwat; Nitin Kulkarni; Raju Sonawane; Amar Sonawane; Swati Deshmukh; Ruchira Jadhav	
N O V	8	Manmauji	Sheetal Shetty	Bhushan Patil; Sayali Sanjeev; Ria Nalavade; Bhalchandra Kadam; Sanjay Mone; Sunil Tawde; Nishigandha Wad; Jaywant Wadkar	
N O V	15	Panipuri	Ramesh Chaudhary	Sayali Sanjeev; Makarand Deshpande; Vishakha Subhedar; Rishikesh Joshi; Bharat Ganeshpure; Prajakta Hanamgar; Kailash Waghmare; Shivali Parab; Pratiksha Jadhav; Sachin Bangar; Anushka Pimputkar; Abhay Gite	
N O V	15	Naad	Prakash Pawar	Kiran Gaikwad; Sapna Mane; Yashraj Dimbale; Abhinay Jagtap	
N O V	22	Dharmarakshak Mahaveer Chhatrapati Sambhaji Maharaj: Chapter 1	Tushar Shelar	Thakur Anoop Singh; Amruta Khanvilkar; Pradeep Rawat; Sanjay Khapre; Kamlesh Sawant; Kishori Shahane; Bhargavi Chirmule; Raj Zutshi	
N O V	22	Raanti	Samit Kakkad	Sharad Kelkar; Shanvi Srivastava; Santosh Juvekar; Sanjay Narvekar	
N O V	22	Gulaabi	Abhyangh Kuvalekar	Shruti Marathe; Ashwini Bhave; Mrunal Kulkarni	
N O V	29	Journey	Sachin Dabhade	Shubham More; Nikhil Rathod; Shantanu Moghe; Sharvari Jemnis; Anjali Ujwane	
D E C	20	Hashtag Tadev Lagnam	Anand Dilip Gokhale	Subodh Bhave; Tejashri Pradhan; Sharmishtha Raut; Archana Nipankar; Sanjay Khapare; Pradeep Welankar	
D E C	20	Shri Ganesha	Milind Kavde	Shashank Shende; Prathamesh Parab; Sanjay Narvekar; Megha Shinde	
D E C	27	Rukhwat	Vikram Pradhan	Santosh Juvekar; Priyadarshini Indalkar	

== See also ==
- List of highest-grossing Marathi films
- List of Marathi films of 2025
- List of Marathi films of 2023
