= 2025 in Marathi cinema =

2025 in Marathi cinema refers to an overview of Marathi-language films produced and released during the year, including their commercial performance, and industry developments. The industry witnessed a notable decline in box-office performance, with total collections dropping to ₹99.46 crore from approximately ₹177 crore in the previous year. Despite the downturn, numerous films achieved critical appreciation and gained international visibility, with multiple films being screened and recognised at domestic and international film festivals.

== Overview ==
A total of 110 Marathi films were released theatrically in 2025. The year considered challenging and characterised by a significant decline in box office performance alongside continued creative experimentation. According to Ormax Media, the main reason for the downturn of Marathi cinema was the absence of any successful franchise films. Industry observers attributed the downturn to increasing competition from large-scale Hindi and international productions, and structural issues related to distribution and screen allocation. The recovery of Marathi theatre was also a factor in the decline in attendance at theatres. During the year, Dashavatar, Jarann, SuSheela SuJeet, Gulkand and Ata Thambaycha Naay! emerged as some of the biggest commercial successes. Social dramas, thriller and family-oriented narratives and comedies continued to dominate Marathi cinema during the year. Several Marathi films secured screenings and accolades at domestic and international film festivals during the year.

=== Genres and trends ===
In 2025, Marathi cinema saw a notable presence of thrillers and horror films. Jarann examined supernatural beliefs, mental sicknesses and other fearful occurrences while Dashavatar used folk art and folklore to create mystery. Crime thrillers like P. S. I. Arjun, Jilabi and Asambhav successfully appealed to urban audiences, marking a diversification of genres away from the traditionally popular light-hearted narrative and family dramas. Several romantic dramas explored different dimensions of relationships were released in 2025. For example, Zapuk Zupuk, Majhi Parthana, Aarpar, Sajana, Bin Lagnachi Goshta, Ek Radha Ek Meera, Tu Bol Na and Premachi Goshta 2 represent different aspects of loving relationships.

At the same time, family comedies and emotional dramas occupied a large number of release dates in Marathi Cinema. Fussclass Dabhade issued its impetus toward family relationships and wedding celebrations, whereas Gulkand used comedy to convey the good and bad sides of marriage life. SuSheela SuJeet created situation comedies using closed sets.

In addition to mainstream commercial releases, Marathi cinema in 2025 reflected thematic diversity across genres. Sabar Bonda, an LGBTQ-themed film, became the first Marathi film to be screened at the Sundance Film Festival. The film was also featured among the best Indian films of the year by publications such as Scroll.in, The Hollywood Reporter India, Rediff.com, and The Telegraph. (Note: Multiple references) Social dramas such as Sthal, Sa La Te Sa La Na Te and Asha further expanded the industry's narrative scope by addressing contemporary social concerns.

=== Notable performances ===
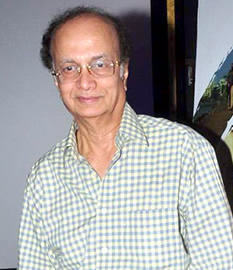
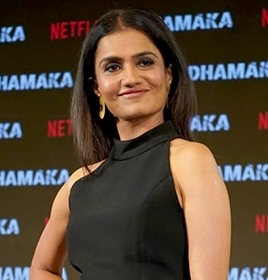
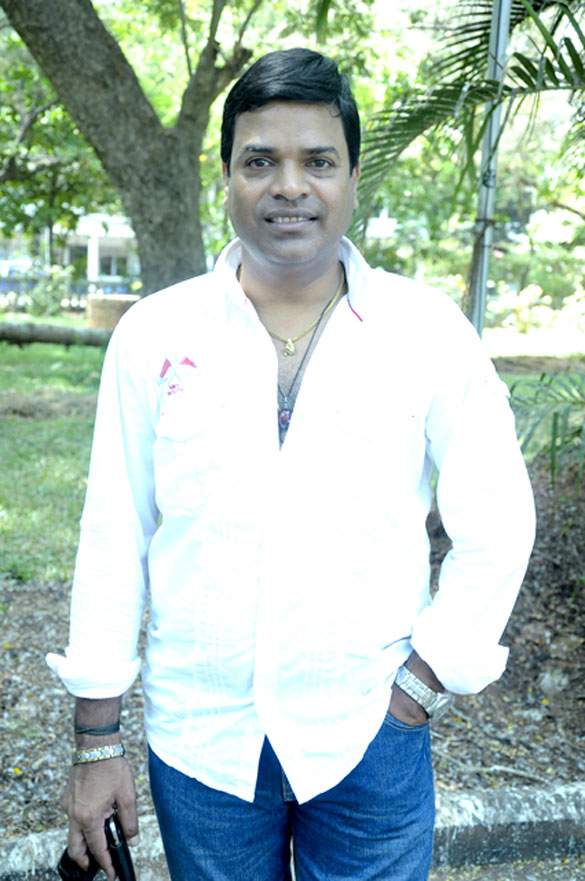
(Left to right): Dilip Prabhavalkar, Amruta Subhash, and Bharat Jadhav

Dilip Prabhavalkar received critical acclaim for his portrayal of Babuli Mestry in Dashavatar. Reviewers praised his nuanced performance at the age of 81, emotional depth, and strong screen presence, considering it one of the standout performances of the year. Alongside Prabhavalkar, several veteran actors appeared in Marathi films, including Ashok Saraf and Vandana Gupte (Ashi Hi Jamva Jamvi), Mahesh Manjrekar and Renuka Shahane (Devmanus), Nivedita Saraf (Fussclass Dabhade), and Prashant Damle (Mu. Po. Bombilwaadi).

The year further featured notable performances by Amruta Subhash and Anita Date appeared in Jarann, with Scroll.in describing Subhash as “terrified, terrifying, and terrific.” Subhash won Zee Chitra Gaurav Puraskar for Best Actress for his role Radha. Bharat Jadhav and Siddharth Jadhav in Ata Thambaycha Naay! also praised for their roles. In its review, The Times of India wrote, "Bharat Jadhav takes a role that's in complete contrast to his well-known comic characters and shows why more filmmakers need to look beyond comedy when it comes to casting him. Ditto for Siddharth Jadhav, who doesn't go off-track even once in his portrayal."

Sai Tamhankar, Samir Choughule and Esha Dey in Gulkand, Siddharth Bodke (Devmanus, Punha Shivajiraje Bhosale) also received appreciation for their performances. Hruta Durgule and Lalit Prabhakar (Aarpar), Abhinay Berde (Uttar), and Rinku Rajguru (Asha) were among other actors noted during the year. Sajiri Joshi, who appeared in April May 99, won Best Debut Actress at the Zee Chitra Gaurav Puraskar.

== Events ==
=== January ===
- 10 January – 10th Ajanta Ellora Film Festival was held at the Rukmini Auditorium of MGM University, Chhatrapati Sambhajinagar.

=== February ===
- 10 February – Maharashtra Cultural Affairs Minister Ashish Shelar announced plans to establish a grand museum at Kolhapur Film City dedicated to preserving the cultural heritage of Marathi cinema.
- 13 February – The Pune International Film Festival (PIFF) commenced with a theme celebrating the 100th birth anniversary of Raj Kapoor.
- 14 February – At PIFF, Swati Mhase Patil of Film City, Mumbai announced major initiatives to boost Marathi cinema, including the Grand Film City in Goregaon, the Single Window Scheme, the ‘Kalasetu’ portal for writers, financial grants and subsidies for filmmakers, the launch of IICT training institute, green initiatives, and plans to promote Marathi films at international platforms.

=== March ===
- 28 March – Following the delay in obtaining censor certification for Mee Pathishi Aahe, its release was postponed. The film's team met Amey Khopkar, who directly demanded the establishment of a separate censor board for Marathi films, citing recurring certification delays affecting the industry.

=== April ===
- 23 April – From April 21–24, Chitrapataka—the first International Marathi Film Festival in Maharashtra—will be held at the PL Deshpande Maharashtra Kala Academy, Mumbai, featuring 41 films and related events.

=== May ===
- 1 May – The Maharashtra government granted industry status to the Marathi film sector and announced the restart of the Translation Academy.

=== July ===
- 25 July – The second NAFA Marathi Film Festival was held in San Jose from 25 to 27 July.

=== August ===
- 5 August –
  - The 60th and 61st Maharashtra State Film Awards held in Sardar Vallabhbhai Patel Indoor Stadium, Worli, Mumbai.
  - Maharashtra Deputy Chief Minister Eknath Shinde announced the formation of a government committee to address issues affecting Marathi cinema.
- 9 August – The 14th Goa Marathi Film Festival was held at INOX and Maquinez Palace in Panaji.

=== September ===
- 23 September – The 71st National Film Awards ceremony was held in New Delhi, presenting awards for films and artists from the year 2023. Marathi films and artists received five awards at the ceremony.

=== October ===
- 9 October – The Maharashtra government has approved the creation of a film industry in Igatpuri, Nashik on the lines of Goregaon Chitranagari under the Nashik Division Development Program 2009.

=== December ===
- 18 December – The two-day Orange City Marathi film festival organised Orange City Cultural Foundation (OCCF), Nagpur Municipal Corporation, Nagpur University, NFDC, Mukta Arts, Cine Montage, Saptak, and Persistent Systems started in Nagpur.

== International screenings and accolades ==
In 2025, Marathi films received critical acclaim and recognition at domestic and international film festivals.

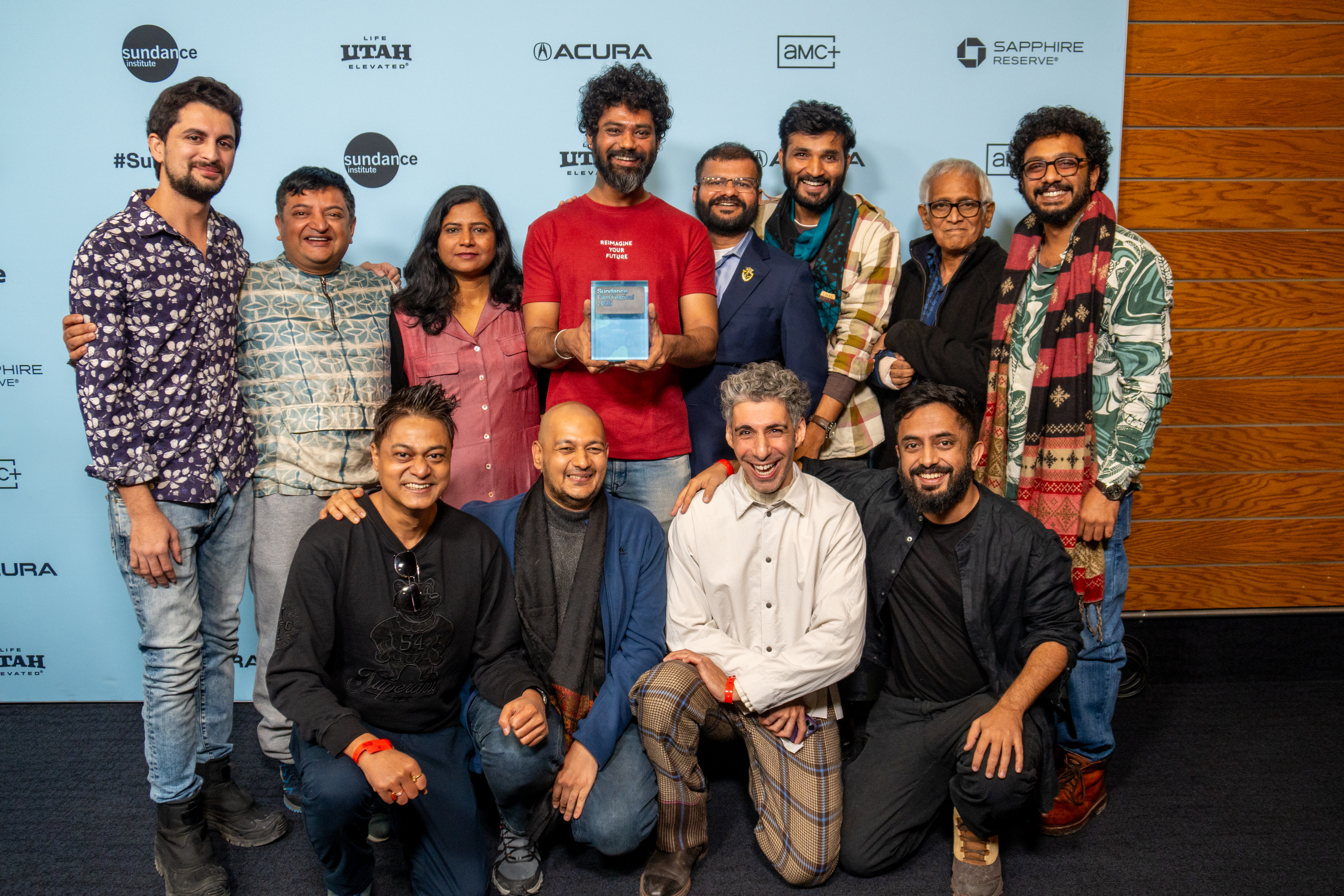
Sabar Bonda (Cactus Pears) at the 2025 Sundance Film Festival.

In January 2025, the 22nd Third Eye Asian Film Festival was held in Mumbai, where eleven Marathi films were screened in the Marathi Competition section. The selected films included April May 99, Gondhal, Sabar Bonda and Uttar. Other films that were theatrically released in 2025 and had been selected for the same festival in the previous year included Asha and Bhera. Bhera was also screened at the Chennai International Film Festival, the Pune International Film Festival, as well as the Cannes Film Festival in 2024. Ria Nalwade's starrer film Teen Payancha Ghoda (Three-Legged Horse), which received a theatrical release in 2025, was also recognized at the Indian Film Festival of Melbourne.

The film Sthal premiered at the 48th Toronto International Film Festival, it become the only Marathi film that was selected under the Discovery Programme. It was subsequently screened at 29 Indian festivals, including the 22nd Pune International Film Festival (where it was presented as the opening film at the Habitat Film Festival), the 46th Moscow International Film Festival, the 25th Jeonju International Film Festival, and the 28th International Film Festival of Kerala. Sthal also secured a screening slot at the Cannes Film Festival, alongside other Marathi films such as Snow Flower, Khalid Ka Shivaji, and Juna Furniture.

The Ram Malik directorial film Uut was also featured at several domestic and international film festivals, including the Malaysia Film Festival, Eastern Europe Film Festival, East Village New York Film Festival, Cincine Film Festival, Sri Lanka International Film Festival, Manchester Film Festival, Ahmedabad International Film Festival and the Cannes Film Festival. In November 2025, the films Ata Thambaycha Naay! and Gondhal were officially selected at the 56th International Film Festival of India. Gondhal was featured in the Indian Panorama (Golden Peacock) section, and its director won the Best Director award at the festival.

=== Notable accolades ===
Award	Year (Note: Some awards listed were conferred prior to 2025; however, the films were theatrically released in 2025.)	Category	Recipient(s)/Film	Result	Ref.
Sundance Film Festival	2025	World Cinema Grand Jury Prize: Dramatic	Sabar Bonda	Won	
Inside Out Film and Video Festival	2025	Best Narrative Feature	Sabar Bonda	Won	
Bengaluru International Film Festival	2024	Second Best Film (Asian Film Competition)	Sthal	Nominated	
New York Indian Film Festival	2024	Best Film	Sthal	Nominated	
New York Indian Film Festival	2024	Best Debut Film	Jayant Digambar Somalkar	Nominated	
New York Indian Film Festival	2024	Best Actress	Nandini Chikte	Nominated	
Pune International Film Festival	2024	Best International Marathi Film (Marathi Competition)	Sthal	Won	
Pune International Film Festival	2024	Best Screenplay (Marathi Competition)	Jayant Digambar Somalkar (Sthal)	Won	
Third Eye Asian Film Festival	2024	Best Film (Marathi Competition)	Sthal	Won	
Third Eye Asian Film Festival	2026	Best Film (Marathi Competition)	Sabar Bonda	Won	
Third Eye Asian Film Festival	2024	Best Actress (Marathi Competition)	Nandini Chikate (Sthal)	Won	
Third Eye Asian Film Festival	2025	Best Actress (Marathi Competition)	Shraddha Khanolkar (Bhera)	Won	
Third Eye Asian Film Festival	2026	Best Actress (Marathi Competition)	Renuka Shahane (Uttar) (Note: Shared with Bhakti Ghogare (Giran))	Won	
Third Eye Asian Film Festival	2026	Best Director	Rohan Kanawade (Sabar Bonda), Santosh Davakhar (Gondhal)	Won	
Third Eye Asian Film Festival	2026	Best Actor	Suraj Suman, Bhushan Manoj (Sabar Bonda)	Won	
Toronto International Film Festival	2023	NETPAC Award	Jayant Digambar Somalkar (Sthal)	Won	
Srilanka International Film Festival	2025	Best Feature Film	Uut	Won	
International Film Festival of India	2025	Best Director	Gondhal	Won	

== Commercial performance ==
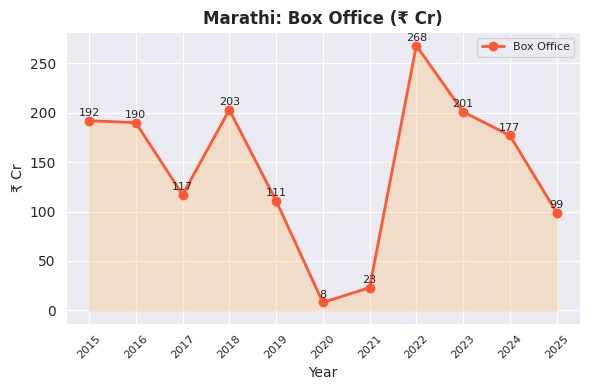
A decade marked by fluctuations and a sharp pandemic dip, followed by a strong rebound in 2022 that was not sustained, as collections gradually declined in the subsequent years.

In 2025, the industry recorded one of its worst box office performances, with overall revenue of ₹99 crore and footfalls of 70 lakh — the lowest figures in the last ten years of recorded data, excluding the COVID-19 pandemic period. Only 10 films constituted 9 percent of the total, earned approximately 75 percent of the total box office revenue, which was ₹74.46 crore. The Marathi film industry recordethehue compared to other major Indian language industries. Around 10 average-performing Marathi films, which earn between Rs 1 and 2 crore each, collectively earned ₹14 crore. In contrast, the remaining 90 films collectively earned just ₹11 crore, resulting in an average of ₹12 lakh per film. The revenue dropped by 46 percent compared to 2024, when the industry had earned ₹177 crore.

The highest-grossing Marathi film of 2025 was Dashavatar which grossed ₹29 crore worldwide. It was the only Marathi film in 2025 to cross ₹10 crore in its opening week and was produced/financed with a budget of ₹12.50 crore making it one of the expensive projects in Marathi cinema. Another high-budget production during the year was Punha Shivajiraje Bhosale, made on budget of ₹13 crore. However, the film underperformed at the box office and failed to recover its production costs, ultimately emerging as a commercial failure. Other successful commercial box office releases this year included Jarann (₹9 crore–₹10 crore), Gulkand (₹8.14 crore), SuSheela SuJeet (₹8.76 crore), and Ata Thambaycha Naay! (₹7.45 crore). The majority of releases struggled to sustain theatrical runs, with revenues largely concentrated among the top-performing films.

Several films achieved sustained theatrical runs, including Ata Thambaycha Naay!, Gulkand and Fussclaas Dabhade all of which ran in the theatres for more than 50 days. The debutant Rohan Mapuskar's coming-of-age film April May 99 also achieved a significant milestone by successfully running for 30 consecutive days. Similarly films like Jarann, Devmanus, Mukkam Post Devach Ghar, Ashi Hi Jamva Jamvi and Sant Dnyaneshwaranchi Muktai bringing audiences to the theatres in the first six months of this year.

== Challenges ==
=== Structural and Economic Challenges ===
Marathi cinema faced many problems that are structural and economic in nature. During panel discussions organised by Loksatta, which included Kedar Shinde, Sanjay Jadhav, Kshitij Patwardhan, and Bavesh Janavlekar (from Zee Studios), at the University of Mumbai, said that there were box office sustainability issues, differences in marketing for movies and availability of distribution opportunities. According to the data presented during discussion, only six films earned more than ₹3 crore at the box office and even fewer of these films earned back their cost of production and marketing expenses. Participants expressed concerns about the impact of big-budget Hindi films, particularly regarding digital marketing expenditure, as well as discussing challenges with some parts of Maharashtra having limited access to theatres. It was noted that Marathi audiences contribute approximately ₹600–900 crore to the collections of Hindi films, with Chhaava alone earning over ₹300 crore just from Maharashtra.

=== Screen allocation and pricing reforms ===
The Government of Maharashtra made an effort in 2025 to resolve issues brought forward by Marathi film producers and distributors about how many screens were available for their films and how those films were being displayed in multiplex cinemas across the state. The Deputy Chief Minister, Eknath Shinde, decided after receiving complaints against multiplexes across the state for not showing enough film shows or for taking films out of multiplexes too early after their initial release date that he would establish a committee to make recommendations to the state government to improve the viability of making Marathi feature films available in theatres through long-term and sustainable development practices.

Further to the announcement, a meeting was held in October 2025 with representatives of the Marathi Film Industry and the State Government to reach an agreement regarding the price that should be charged for cinema tickets and the way they will be exhibited in cinemas. After the Government of Karnataka set a maximum cinema ticket price of ₹200, many of the industry bodies in Maharashtra proposed that a maximum cinema ticket price of between ₹150 and ₹200 be used in multiplex cinemas and single screen theatres. The meeting was chaired by the State Secretary for Home Affairs and included filmmakers, distributors, exhibitors and film association representatives. Among the issues that were discussed included the regulation of cinema ticket prices, the cost of food or beverages in cinemas and how to allocate additional screening times for Marathi Feature Films. A committee has been set up to look at these proposals, with a decision announced at an upcoming State Legislative session. Cinema exhibitors, however, expressed concerns regarding the financial viability of operations under a reduced pricing model.

=== Marathi theatre resurgence ===
In 2025, Marathi theatre recorded significant growth in ticket sales and audience attendance. BookMyShow, who provide statistics for ticket sales for various forms of entertainment, reported an increase in ticket sales for Marathi plays of 50%, compared to the prior year. Some large-scale productions (i.e., Sangeet Devbabhali) saw repeated advance sell-outs throughout major venues in Mumbai and Thane. The resurgence of theatre and live performance experienced during this time was also in the face of ongoing box office performance challenges for Marathi cinema. Audiences are increasingly valuing strong content, storytelling, and emotional depth over star power, making these factors central to box office outcomes.

=== Industry Reactions ===
In interview in February 2025 with NDTV Marathi, filmmaker Nipun Dharmadhikari stated that Marathi cinema has historically embraced experimentation and does not adhere to rigid commercial formulas. He noted that the industry is increasingly adapting to a box office model driven by opening weekend performance, contrasting it with southern film industries where strong first-week theatrical culture prevails. He also expressed optimism about the future of Marathi cinema despite financial and distribution challenges. In September 2025, Veteran actor Makarand Anaspure stated during his Pune visit "Marathi cinema is not affordable in multiplexes. The rulers should try for this. The facility of watching Marathi cinema for ₹100 rupees should be made available across the state. By doing this, Marathi cinema will see good days."

In an interview with India Today, film director Mahesh Manjrekar stating “Content-wise, Malayalam and Marathi are the only industries which give content, otherwise it is all commerce.” He also suggested that producers should prioritise quality over quantity and consider collaborative investments to mount higher-budget films capable of wider, pan-India reach. Similarly actor Gashmeer Mahajani raised the same issue, stating "Rather than increasing ticket prices, we should think about improving the quality of film production. First, make good films and then think about money; it's simple math." According to Kshitij Patwardhan, who spoke with The Hindu, Marathi films in general have trouble securing adequate showtimes for major Hindi films as well as internationally produced films. He cited the example of his feature film Uttar, which was released alongside the Hindi film Dhurandhar and the international film Avatar: Fire and Ash. Due to simultaneous high-profile releases, Uttar reportedly faced difficulties in securing sufficient screens across Maharashtra.

== Controversies ==
In February 2025, actor Rahul Solapurkar resigned as a trustee of the Bhandarkar Oriental Research Institute (BORI) after controversy erupted over his statement about Chhatrapati Shivaji Maharaj. During a podcast interview, Solapurkar stated that Shivaji Maharaj escaped from Agra Fort in 1666 by bribing Mughal officials of Aurangzeb, rather than hiding in sweet baskets as described in the popular narrative.

His statement triggered protests by Maratha groups in Pune, who demanded his resignation. Following public backlash and political criticism — including condemnation from BJP MP Udayanraje Bhosale — Solapurkar issued a public apology, saying his words were taken out of context and that he never intended to insult Shivaji Maharaj. Amid rising tensions, police protection was deployed at BORI and outside his residence. BORI accepted his resignation shortly after.

In March 2025, Harshad Nalawade's film Follower faced protests in Belagavi after members of the Karnataka Rakshana Vedike (Shivaramegouda faction) objected to its alleged portrayal of the Kannada–Marathi linguistic dispute. Activists disrupted a screening at an Inox theatre and sought a ban, claiming the film could disturb law and order. Police intervened and appealed for calm, while the filmmakers stated that the film was a creative work centered on friendship and denied that it promoted division.

In July 2025, after multiplexes reduced the screenings of the Marathi film Ye Re Ye Re Paisa 3 to accommodate the Hindi film Saiyaara. Leaders of the Maharashtra Navnirman Sena and Shiv Sena alleged discrimination against regional films and staged protests demanding strict implementation of the policy of reserving screens for Marathi films. The issue has reignited the debate over cultural representation and linguistic politics in Maharashtra.

Khalid Ka Shivaji was one of the most hotly debated problems by National Award-winning Director Raj Pritam More; prior to release, they faced multiple allegations about altering the history surrounding them ultimately garnering national attention when several organizations and other individuals raised objections and these were brought before the state legislature.

The other film controversy involves Manache Shlok, directed by Mrunmayee Deshpande. Followers of Samarth Ramdas Swamiy protested against their use of the title and public screenings in Pune were shut due to this growing objection. The producers ultimately agreed to change the title due to this growing level of opposition.

On 4 October 2025, Leaders of the Maharashtra Navnirman Sena objected to the discontinuation of the Marathi film Chhabi at Miraj Cinemas, Ambarnath, demanding its immediate reinstatement and warning the management of consequences if screenings were not resumed.

In October 2025, Everest Entertainment LLP filed a case in the Bombay High Court against Mahesh Manjrekar, alleging copyright infringement and breach of contract over sequel rights related to Mi Shivajiraje Bhosale Boltoy!. The court initially ordered a special screening of the film.

However, the High Court later refused to stay the release of Punha Shivajiraje Bhosale, observing that Everest had approached the court at the “eleventh hour.” Justice Amit S. Jamsandekar held that there was no substantial reproduction of the earlier film and that common phrases and references to Chhatrapati Shivaji Maharaj cannot be monopolised. The film was allowed to release on October 31.

== Debuts ==
=== Direction ===
- Sthal – Jayant Somalkar
- Ata Thambaycha Naay! – Shivraj Waichal
- Banjara – Sneh Ponkshe
- April May 99 – Rohan Mapuskar
- Sajana – Shashikant Dhotre
- Dashavatar – Subodh Khanolkar
- Kurla To Vengurla – Vijay Kalamkar
- Sabar Bonda – Rohan Kanawade
- Gondhal – Santosh Davakhar
- Teen Payancha Ghoda – Noopur Bora (Note: The film was theatrically released in 2025.)
- Uttar – Kshitij Patwardhan
- Malhar Tango – Saya Date
- Follower – Harshad Nalawade

=== Acting ===
- April May 99 – Sajiri Joshi
- Premachi Goshta 2 – Ridhima Pandit
- Avakarika – Rohit Pawar
- Asurvan – Sachin Chandwade
- Chhabi – Srushti Bahekar
- Tu Maza Kinara – Keya Ingle
- Ye Re Ye Re Paisa 3 – Ishan Khopkar
- Follower – Raghu Prakash

=== Production ===
- Jarann – Anees Bazmee
- Tango Malhar – Saya Date

=== Cinematography ===
- April May 99 – Apoorva Shaligram

=== Music ===
- Uttar – Radhika Bhide

== Deaths ==
=== April ===
- 28 April – Prakash Bhende (83), actor, producer

=== May ===
- 10 May – Vikram Gaikwad (61), makeup artist
- 17 May – Ashish Ubale (58), writer and director

=== June ===
- 19 June – Vivek Lagoo (74), actor
- 20 June – Tushar Ghadigaonkar (34), actor

=== August ===
- 16 August – Jyoti Chandekar (69), actress
- 18 August – Achyut Potdar (90), actor
- 28 August – Bal Karve (95), actor
- 31 August – Priya Marathe (38), actress

=== October ===
- 4 October – Sandhya Shantaram (94), actress
- 24 October – Sachin Chandwade (25), actor

=== November ===
- 3 November – Daya Dongre (85), actress

== Awards ==
- Zee Chitra Gaurav Puraskar 2025
- 9th Filmfare Awards Marathi
- 60th Maharashtra State Film Awards
- 61th Maharashtra State Film Awards
- Zee Marathi Awards 2025
