= List of Indian films of 2025 =

Indian Films
- Previous: List of Indian films of 2024; Next: List of Indian films of 2026

This is a list of the highest grossing Indian films released in 2025.

== Box office collection ==
Background shading indicates that a film is currently showing in theatres worldwide.

The following is the list of highest-grossing Indian films released in 2025. The rank of the films in the following table depends on the estimate of worldwide collections as reported by reliable sources. There is no official tracking of domestic box office figures within India.

Highest grossing Indian films of 2025
Rank	Title	Language	Worldwide gross	Ref.
1	Dhurandhar	Hindi	₹1,350.83–1,428 crore	
2	Kantara: Chapter 1	Kannada	₹850−852 crore	(Note: Kantara: Chapter 1's reported worldwide grosses vary between ₹850 crore (Deccan Chronicle, Cinema Express, The New Indian Express, and DNA India) – ₹852 crore (Deccan Herald and News18))
3	Chhaava	Hindi	₹797.34–809 crore	(Note: Chhava's reported worldwide grosses vary between ₹797.34 crore (Bollywood Hungama) – ₹800 crore (India Today) – ₹804.85 crore (The Economic Times) – ₹808 crore (DNA India, The Hollywood Reporter) – ₹809 crore (Hindustan Times))
4	Saiyaara	Hindi	₹579 crore	
5	Coolie	Tamil	₹514–675 crore	(Note: Coolie's reported worldwide grosses vary between ₹514 crore (The Hans India; Filmfare; Network18 Group) – ₹515 crore (OTTPlay) – ₹675 crore (The Indian Express; Zee News))
6	Mahavatar Narsimha	Hindi; Kannada; Tamil; Telugu	₹300–327 crore	(Note: Mahavatar Narsimha's reported worldwide grosses vary between ₹300 crore (Hindustan Times, Cinema Express, News18) – ₹324.5 crore (The Economic Times) – ₹325 crore (DNA India) –₹327 crore (The Hollywood Reporter))
7	Lokah Chapter 1: Chandra	Malayalam	₹302–304 crore	(Note: Lokah Chapter 1: Chandra's reported worldwide gross is from ₹301.98 crore (The Telegraph) to ₹302.5 crore (ThePrint) to ₹303.2 crore (The Week) – ₹304 crore (The Hollywood Reporter))
8	L2: Empuraan	Malayalam	₹268.05 crore	
9	War 2	Hindi	₹240–250 crore	
10	They Call Him OG	Telugu	₹233.65–240 crore	(Note: They Call Him OG grossed ₹233.65 crore (News18; The Telegraph) – ₹234 crore (Daily News and Analysis) – ₹200 crore (The Economic Times))

== Lists of Indian films of 2025 ==
- List of Bengali films of 2025
- List of Bhojpuri films of 2025
- List of Gujarati films of 2025
- List of Hindi films of 2025
- List of Kannada films of 2025
- List of Malayalam films of 2025
- List of Marathi films of 2025
- List of Odia films of 2025
- List of Punjabi films of 2025
- List of Tamil films of 2025
- List of Telugu films of 2025
- List of Tulu films of 2025

== See also ==
- List of Indian films of 2026
- List of Indian films of 2024
- 2025 in Marathi cinema
- List of 2025 box office number-one films in India

== Notes ==
Preceded by 2024	Indian films 2025	Succeeded by 2026
