= Tendulkar Out =

- Theatrical release poster
- Directed by: Swapnil Jaykar
- Produced by: Anaya Mhaiskar
- Starring: Aniket Vishwasrao; Santosh Juvekar; Sai Tamhankar; Sayaji Shinde
- Cinematography: Amalendu Chaudhary
- Edited by: Rajesh Rao
- Music by: Amar Mohile
- Production company: Zee Talkies
- Release date: 15 November 2013
- Country: India
- Language: Marathi

Tendulkar Out is a 2013 Indian Marathi-language film directed by Swapnil Jaykar. The film stars Aniket Vishwasrao, Santosh Juvekar, Sai Tamhankar and Sayaji Shinde. It was theatrically released on 15 November 2013.

== Cast ==
- Aniket Vishwasrao
- Santosh Juvekar
- Vijay Maurya
- Sai Tamhankar
- Sayaji Shinde
- Neelam Shirke
- Atul Parchure

== Reception ==
=== Critical response ===
A reviewer of Loksatta wrote "For any purpose, this film has successfully proved that entertainment can be done without being a masala film". Saumitra Pote from Maharashtra Times opined, "In the first part, it seems that he is a little shaky or something. But, the second part is an antidote to it. So ultimately the result of the movie is positive". A reviewer of Lokmat wrote "He has mastered the flow of the story by adding cricket commentary and action replays to the story".
