= Shivrayancha Chhava =

2024 Indian Marathi-language film

- Theatrical release poster
- Directed by: Digpal Lanjekar
- Written by: Digpal Lanjekar
- Produced by: Vaibhav Bhor; Kishore Patkar; Madhu
- Starring: Bhushan Patil; Chinmay Mandlekar; Mrinal Kulkarni; Trupti Toradmal; Sameer Dharmadhikari; Rahul Dev
- Cinematography: Priyanka Mayekar
- Edited by: Sagar Shinde; Vinay Shinde
- Music by: Devdutta Manisha Baji
- Production companies: Malhar Picture Company; Everest Entertainment
- Distributed by: AA Films
- Release date: 16 February 2024
- Running time: 145 minutes
- Country: India
- Language: Marathi
- Box office: ₹14 crore

Shivrayancha Chhava is a 2024 Indian Marathi-language historical drama film written and directed by Digpal Lanjekar and produced by Malhar Picture Company. The film stars Bhushan Patil, Chinmay Mandlekar, Mrinal Kulkarni, Ayesha Madhukar, Sameer Dharmadhikari, and Rahul Dev. The film revolves around Chhatrapati Sambhaji Maharaj, the son of Chhatrapati Shivaji Maharaj and the second Chhatrapati of the Maratha Empire, who ruled from 1681 to 1689.

The film was theatrically released on 16 February 2024 and grossed over ₹14 crore at the box office and become the fifth highest-grossing Marathi film of the year.

== Plot ==
The second Chhatrapati of the Maratha Empire Sambhaji Maharaj, commonly known as Shambhuraje, ruled from 1681 to 1689 and is the subject of the movie. Chhatrapati Shivaji Maharaj, the Maratha Empire's founder, had him as his eldest son.

== Cast ==
- Bhushan Patil as Chatrapati Sambhaji Maharaj
- Chinmay Mandlekar as Chatrapati Shivaji Maharaj
- Mrinal Kulkarni as Jijabai
- Trupti Toradmal as Maharani Yesubai
- Sameer Dharmadhikari as Aurangazeb
- Rahul Dev as Kakar Khan
- Ravi Kale as Bahirji Naik
- Isha Keskar as Gojau
- Prasanna Ketkar as Sarsenapati Hambirrao
- Abhijeet Shwetachandra as Jotyaji Kesarkar
- Vikram Gaikwad as Kavi Kalash
- Dnyanesh Wadekar as Asad Khan
- Dipti Lele as Bakula
- Sachin Bhilare as Bhavya
- Bipin Surve as Aurangazeb's messenger
- Avdhoot Gandhi as Ramchandra Pant Amatya
- Sagar Sant as Nilopant Peshwe
- Amit Deshmukh as Kondaji Farzand
- Bhushan Shivtare as Yesaji Kank
- Sagar Jadhav as Rupaji Bhosale
- Nikhil Jogdand as Manaji More
- Ashutosh Wadekar as Marwari trader

== Production ==
The makers wrap up the production in June 2023 and film was officially announced in September of same year.

== Release ==
The film was released on more than 400 theaters and more than 1200 shows on 16 February 2024.

=== Marketing ===
The first motion poster unveiled by Eknath Shinde on 3 October 2023.

== Reception ==
=== Critical response ===
Santosh Bhingarde of Saam TV rated 3.5 stars out of 5 stars and wrote "Amar Mohile's background music makes the movie more interesting and the special thing is that the music of the movie is melodious, for that Devdutt Manisha Baji has to be appreciated. However, there are some illogical elements in the film that do not make sense." Anub George of The Times of India rated 3.0 out of 5 stars and wrote "An action-packed recreation of Chhatrapati Sambhaji Maharaj's times." Prerana Janham of Sakal gave 3 stars and wrote "Watching the fiery history of Shambhuraj through the medium of this film is an enriching experience." Jaideep Pathkaji of Maharashtra Times rated 3/5 and wrote "Even if the movie does not give a very 'great' experience showing the life of Shambhuraj, it is definitely worth watching once."

Devendra Jadhav of Lokmat rated 3 out of 5 stars and wrote "The songs and music in the movies create excitement on the occasion of the battle. It seems that the movie is too long before the interval. So there is no doubt that if the length had been reduced a little, Shivarayancha Chhava would have been more effective." Jyoti Venkatesh of Cine Blitz awarded 3 stars out of 5 and wrote "It is no wonder that the film manages to recreate the opulence and intrigue in the halls of both the Mughal and the Maratha courts." Reshma Raikwar of Loksatta wrote "The film has become an immersive experience as the director has emphasized more on the strategic decisions taken by him as the king of the Ryotas, the exploits of his valiant chieftains than merely presenting the history."

=== Box office ===
The film earned ₹1.02 crore (US$110,000) on its first day of release. The film earned over ₹14 crore (US$1.5 million) in its final theatrical run.

== Soundtrack ==
Shivrayancha Chhava

Soundtrack album by Devdutta Manisha Baji
- Released: 2024
- Genre: Feature film soundtrack
- Length: 17:11
- Language: Marathi
- Label: Everest Marathi

Official audio
- Shivrayancha Chhava - Full Album on YouTube

The music is composed by Devdutta Manisha Baji and Background music is by Amar Mohile, while lyrics are written by Digpal Lanjekar.

All lyrics are written by Digpal Lanjekar.

Track listing
No.	Title	Singer (s)	Length
1.	"Sinhasani Baisale Shambhu Raje"	Kailash Kher	5:26
2.	"Vaara Ga Mandi Vaar"	Vaishali Samant, Srujan Kulkarni	6:04
3.	"Chatrapati Sambhaji Maharaj Mudra"	Amar Mohile	2:19
4.	"Udo Bola Ambabaicha"	Nidhi Hegde	3:30
Total length:			17:11
