= MFK Award for Favourite Male Debut =

Maharashtra Film Award

Maharashtracha Favourite Kon? for Favourite Male Debut
- Awarded for: Best Debut Performance by a Male Actor
- Country: India
- Presented by: Zee Talkies
- First award: Gashmeer Mahajani, Deool Band (2015)
- Currently held by: Shreenivas Pokale, Naal (2018)

Maharashtracha Favourite Kon? Award for Favourite Male Debut is given by Zee Talkies as part of its annual Maharashtracha Favourite Kon? ceremony for Marathi films.

Although the MFK Awards started in 2009, awards for the best debut actor category started in 2015. In 2015 and 2016, both the female and male debut competed for a single award, after which separate categories were created for female and male debut.

== Winners and nominees ==
Year	Photos of winners	Actor	Role(s)	Film	Ref.
2015		Gashmeer Mahajani †	Dr. Raghav Shastri	Deool Band	
2015		Dharam Gohil		Aga Bai Arechyaa 2	
2015		Shivraj Vaichal		Aga Bai Arechyaa 2	
2015		Manasi Moghe	Shubhangi	Bugadi Maazi Sandli Ga	
2015		Pallavi Patil	Heena	Classmates	
2015		Neha Mahajan	Yashoda	Nilkanth Master	
2016		Aakash Thosar †	Prashant (Parshya) Kale	Sairat	
2016		Amitriyan Patil	Vikram Rajwade	Rajwade & Sons	
2016		Akshay Tanksale	Shyamsundar (Battees) Paarijaatak	YZ	
2017		Abhinay Berde †	Anurag (Anya)	Ti Saddhya Kay Karte	
2017		Lalit Prabhakar	Satyaprakash / Satya	Chi Va Chi Sau Ka	
2017		Sumedh Mudgalkar	Vikram (Vicky)	Manjha	
2017		Sumedh Mudgalkar	Karan	Ventilator	
2017		Ravi Jadhav	Mohan Katdare	Kachcha Limboo	
2018		Shrinivas Pokale †	Chaitanya (Chaitya) Bhosale	Naal	
