= Dhishkyaoon =

- Theatrical release poster
- Directed by: Pritam SK Patil
- Written by: Sanjay Navgire
- Produced by: Mohammad Deshmukh; Umesh Mohalkar; Pritam SK Patil
- Starring: Prathamesh Parab; Sandeep Pathak; Ahmed Deshmukh; Suresh Vishwakarma; Megha Shinde
- Cinematography: Yogesh Koli
- Edited by: Saumitra Dharsurkar
- Music by: Sanmit Waghmare; Shreyash Deshpande
- Production companies: Act Planet Productions; Zatpat Film Productions
- Distributed by: Filmastra Studios
- Release date: 10 February 2023
- Country: India
- Language: Marathi

Dhishyaoon is a 2023 Indian Marathi-language comedy drama film directed by Pritam SK Patil, written by Sanjay Navgire. It is produced by Act Planet Productions and distributed by Filmastra Studios. The film stars Prathamesh Parab, Sandeep Pathak, Ahmed Deshmukh, Suresh Vishwakarma, Megha Shinde. It was theatrically released on 10 February 2023.

== Cast ==
- Prathamesh Parab
- Sandeep Pathak
- Ahmed Deshmukh
- Suresh Vishwakarma
- Mahesh Ghag
- Siddeshwar Zadbukke
- Megha Shinde
- Sakshi Tonde
- Asawari Nitin
- Harsh Rajput
- Madhu Kulkarni
- Pranav Pimpalkar
- Somnath Giri
- Swati Ghatkar
- Vinaya More
- Prasad Khaire

== Production ==
The first look poster was unveiled in February 2021 by Pritam SK Patil and teaser is released in January 2023, while trailer was released on 29 January 2023. The film is presented by AVK Entertainment and produced by Mohammad Deshmukh, Umesh Mohalkar and Pritam SK Patil. Preksha Gandhi Soni is responsible for the costumes in the film, and Kumar Magare is for the make-up.

== Release ==
The film was theatrically released on 10 February 2023 in Maharashtra.

== Reception ==
A reviewer from The Times of India gave 2.0/5 rating and wrote "A disappointment as it skimps out on the story and the comedy." Film Information gave flop verdict to the film in review.
