= Hoy Maharaja =

2024 Indian film by Shailesh Shetty

- Theatrical release poster
- Directed by: Shailesh Shetty
- Written by: Sanchit Bedre
- Produced by: Mahesh Shetty; Lalita Shetty; Ajesh Shetty; Mohsin Khan
- Starring: Prathamesh Parab; Sandeep Pathak; Ankita Landepatil; Abhijeet Chavan; Samir Choughule
- Cinematography: Vasudeo Rane
- Edited by: Nilesh Navnath Gavand
- Music by: Chinar–Mahesh
- Production company: LMS Films Private Limited
- Distributed by: Cinépolis
- Release date: 31 May 2024 (Maharashtra)
- Running time: 142 minutes
- Country: India
- Language: Marathi

Hoy Maharaja is a 2024 Indian Marathi-language comedy-drama film directed by Shailesh Shetty and produced by LMS Films Private Limited. The film stars Prathamesh Parab, Sandeep Pathak, Ankita Landepatil, Abhijit Chavan, Samir Choughule.

== Cast ==
- Prathamesh Parab as Ramya
- Sandeep Pathak as Rashid Bhai
- Ankita Lande as Aisha
- Abhijeet Chavan as Mama
- Samir Choughule as Jignes
- Vaibhav Mangle as Anna
- Sanika Kashikar as Sania
- Neha Waze Paranjpe as Mami
- Sandeep Redkar as Sashikant Jadhav
- Sandeep Juwatkar as Uday
- Amir Tadwalkar as Abbas Bhai
- Shraddha Joshi as Inspector Shahane

== Marketing ==
The trailer was released on 23 May 2024.

== Release ==
The film was theatrically released on 31 May 2024 in all over Maharashtra.

== Reception ==
Kalpeshraj Kubal of Maharashtra Times rated 3 stars out of 5 stars, he suggests that the film will appeal to a specific audience, and they highlight elements such as the music by Chinar–Mahesh, Savani Ravindra's songs, dancing sequences, and the talents of the comedians as contributing positively to the movie. Jyoti Venkatesh of Cine Blitz also gave 3 stars out of 5 stars, she points out some weaknesses in storytelling and opinioned that the story lacks entertainment and engagement, possibly due to the introduction of too many characters, which can be exhausting for the viewers.

== Soundtrack ==
Track listing
No.	Title	Singer (s)	Length
1.	"Kahitari De Ishara"	Harshwardhan Wavare	2:48
2.	"Ka Mann Vede"	Hrishikesh Ranade & Savani Ravindra	4:33
