= Mumbai Local =

2025 Indian film by Abhijeet

- Directed by: Abhijeet
- Written by: Abhijeet
- Produced by: Nilesh Rathi; Prachi Raut; Sachin Agrawal; Tanvi Maheshwari; Trayambak Daga
- Starring: Prathamesh Parab; Dnyanada Ramtirthkar; Prithvik Pratap; Manmeet Pem; Vanita Kharat
- Cinematography: Yogesh Koli
- Music by: Harshavardhan Wavre; Dev Ashish; Suchir Kulkarni
- Release date: 1 August 2025
- Country: India
- Language: Marathi

Mumbai Local is a 2025 Indian Marathi-language romantic drama film directed and written by Abhijeet. The film features Prathamesh Parab, Dnyanada Ramtirthkar, Prithvik Pratap, Manmmet Pem and Vanita Kharat in leading roles.

The film was theatrically released on 1 August 2025.

== Plot ==
In the heart of bustling Mumbai, two lives collide on a local train, sparking an unexpected journey of love.

== Cast ==
- Prathamesh Parab as Aashish
- Dnyanada Ramtirthkar as Ms. Naigaon
- Prithvik Pratap as Jeet
- Manmeet Pem as Darshan
- Vanita Kharat as Shobha
- Abhijeet Chavan as Police Inspector Vinayak Vichare
- Aniket Kelkar as Sub-inspector Kelkar
- Sanjay Kulkarni as Aashish's Father
- Smita Dongre as Aashish's Mother
- Sanjay Khapre as Sarpanch
- Rajkumar Kanojiya as Pathak
- Javed Khan as Javed
- Vinod Shinde as Manager

== Release ==
The film released across India on 1 August 2025.

== Critical reception ==
Santosh Bhingarde of Sakal awarded 3.5 stars out of 5 stars and wrote "The film beautifully portrays the emotional bonds and love that bloom between couples during everyday Mumbai local journeys, making it engaging and entertaining."

Anub George of The Times of India rated 2 out of 5 stars and wrote "A refreshing twist to the usual romance genre, Mumbai local shines light on the love story of an entirely normal middle class couple."
