= Bamboo (2023 film) =

- Theatrical release poster
- Directed by: Vishal Devrukhkar
- Written by: Ambar Hadap
- Produced by: Santosh Kher; Tejaswini Pandit
- Starring: Abhinay Berde; Tejaswini Pandit; Parth Bhalerao; Shivaji Satam; Samir Choughule
- Cinematography: Yogesh M Koli
- Edited by: Guru Patil
- Music by: Samir Saptiskar
- Production company: Creative Vibe Productions
- Distributed by: Filmastra Studios
- Release date: 26 January 2023
- Country: India
- Language: Marathi

Bamboo is a 2023 Indian Marathi-language drama film directed by Vishal Devrukhkar and produced by Creative Vibe Productions. It stars Abhinay Berde, Vaishnavi Kalyankar Parth Bhalerao, Shivaji Satam and Samir Choughule. The film was theatrically released on 26 January 2023.

== Cast ==
- Abhinay Berde as Chintamani Bhasme
- Vaishnavi Kalyankar as Zuluk
- Parth Bhalerao as Madan
- Shivaji Satam as M.N. Bhasme
- Samir Choughule as Shashikant Prabhulkar
- Atul Kale as Babu Bhasme

== Release ==
The film was theatrically released on 26 January 2023, coinciding Republic day.

== Soundtrack ==
All music is composed by Samir Saptiskar

Track listing
No.	Title	Length
1.	"Mi Tula Tya Najrene"	3:30
