= Delivery Boy (film) =

2024 Indian film by Mohsin Khan

- Theatrical release poster
- Directed by: Mohsin Khan
- Written by: Ram Khatmode; Vinod Vanve
- Produced by: David Nadar
- Starring: Prathamesh Parab; Prithvik Pratap; Ankita Landepatil; Ganesh Yadav
- Cinematography: Tanveer Reyaz Syed Ravi k yadav
- Edited by: Deven Murdeshwar
- Music by: Chinar–Mahesh; L. K. Lakshmikant
- Production company: Lucia Entertainment
- Distributed by: Cinépolis
- Release date: 9 February 2024 (Maharashtra)
- Running time: 130 minutes
- Country: India
- Language: Marathi

Delivery Boy is a 2024 Indian Marathi-language comedy-drama film directed by Mohsin Khan and produced by Lucia Entertainment. The film stars Prathamesh Parab, Prithvik Pratap, Ankita Landepatil, Ganesh Yadav.

The film was theatrically released on 9 February 2024. It was dubbed in Hindi titled Mamta Child Factory and was released digitally on 10 December 2025 on Ultra OTT.

== Plot ==
A young doctor Amrita Deshmukh comes to Digya to look at a bungalow for a hospital. Digya shows her the bungalow. Amrita starts a Mamta fertility center in a bungalow with the idea of giving the joy of motherhood to women who cannot experience motherhood. Digya prepares women for surrogacy in return for a commission. While doing this work, he gradually realizes that he is also doing a kind of social work, but there are some obstacles.

== Cast ==
- Prathamesh Parab as Digambar "Digyabhau" Kantode
- Prithvik Pratap as Chochya
- Ankita Landepatil as Dr. Amrita Deshmukh
- Ganesh Yadav as MLA Sanjay Bhosle
- Shreya Kulkarni as Shalan

== Critical reception ==
Kalpeshraj Kubal of Maharashtra Times rated 2.5 stars out of 5 stars compared it unfavorably to Munna Bhai M.B.B.S, suggesting that it falls short in delivering its intended message due to superficial storytelling as well as criticized screenplay is for not fully exploring the potential of the story, leading to a lack of impact on the audience. A reviewer from Sakal is acknowledge the film's effort to address a sensitive social issue but feel it fell short in some areas. Sanjay Ghaware of Lokmat awarded 2.5 stars out of 5 observed that while the plot lacks innovation and suffers from long scenes interrupting the flow, the acting, lyrics, cinematography, and dialogues are commendable.
