= Hardik Shubhechha =

2025 Marathi film directed by Pushkar Jog

- Directed by: Pushkar Jog
- Written by: Pushkar Jog
- Produced by: Anand Pandit; Roopa Pandit; Pushkar Jog
- Starring: Pushkar Jog; Hemal Ingle
- Cinematography: Yogesh M. Koli
- Edited by: Sunil Dahifale
- Music by: Rohan-Rohan
- Production companies: Anand Pandit Motion Pictures; Goosebumps Entertainment Production
- Distributed by: Panorama Studios
- Release date: 21 March 2025
- Running time: 100 minutes
- Country: India
- Language: Marathi

Hardik Shubhechha... Pan Tyancha Kay? (transl. Heartfelt Greetings… but what about them?), also abbreviated as Hardik Shubhechha, is a 2025 Indian Marathi-language romantic comedy film written and directed by Pushkar Jog, starring Jog and Hemal Ingle. Produced by Anand Pandit Motion Pictures in association with Goosebumps Entertainment, the film explores the sensitive subject of sexual compatibility in marriage through a light-hearted approach. Upon release the film received mixed reviews and failed commercially.

== Plot ==
Madhav Joshi is a man who struggles to find a suitable bride for marriage. After considerable difficulty, he marries Radhika Pathak. On their wedding day, Madhav's friend Ravi gifts him a box of sex toys as a wedding present.

The complications begin on their first night when Radhika discovers the box. Having had a traumatic past experience with her ex-boyfriend who had used sex toys forcibly, she becomes uncomfortable and fearful that her new husband might behave similarly. This discovery creates a significant rift between the newly married couple, and for five months, they are unable to consummate their marriage. Radhika confides in her friend Sapna about her past trauma and her fears regarding her husband, though she doesn't reveal that she had seen the box of sex toys. Meanwhile, the tension in their relationship continues to mount as both partners struggle with unspoken fears and misunderstandings.

After five months of marital discord, Madhav travels to Amsterdam and Paris for a work assignment. During his time in Amsterdam, he befriends Natasha, a divorcee who helps him understand the importance of communication in relationships. She advises Madhav to have an honest conversation with his wife to resolve their differences. Back in India, Sapna explains to Radhika that using intimacy aids to enhance marital relationships is considered normal and healthy. Realizing her mistake and understanding that her fears were based on past trauma rather than her husband's intentions, Radhika decides to make amends. She travels to Paris where Madhav is staying and apologizes to him, leading to the resolution of their marital issues.

== Cast ==
- Pushkar Jog as Madhav Joshi
- Hemal Ingle as Radhika Pathak
- Purvi Mundada as Natasha
- Abhijeet Chavan as Madhav's father
- Vishakha Subhedar as Madhav's mother
- Prithvik Pratap as Ravi
- Anushka Sarkate as Sapna
- Vijay Patkar
- Kishori Ambiye as Radhika's mother

== Production ==
The principal photography took place at various locations abroad, including Amsterdam, Paris, and Dubai, making it the first Marathi film to be shot in Amsterdam and Paris.

== Soundtrack ==
The first romantic song, O Bawari, was unveiled on February 14, 2025, coinciding with Valentine's Day.

Track listing
No.	Title	Lyrics	Music	Singer(s)	Length
1.	"O Bawari"	Manndar Cholkar	Rohan-Rohan	Sonu Nigam	3:15
2.	"Dokyala Shot"	Pushkar Jog, Varun Likhate	Salil Amrute	Varun Likhate	1:53
Total length:					5:08

== Release and reception ==
The motion poster was released in February 2025 followed by the trailer on 27 February 2025. Hardik Shubhechha was released theatrically across India on 21 March 2025 and was distributed by Panorama Studios. The film received mixed to positive reviews from critics who praised Pushkar Jog's bold approach to addressing sexual compatibility in marriage.
