= Karmayogi Abasaheb =

2024 Indian Marathi-language biographical film based on Ganpatrao Deshmukh

- Theatrical release poster
- Directed by: Altaf Dadasaheb Sheikh
- Written by: Dialogues: Altaf Dadasaheb Sheikh
- Screenplay by: Altaf Dadasaheb Sheikh
- Story by: Altaf Dadasaheb Sheikh
- Based on: Ganpatrao Deshmukh
- Produced by: Maruti Tulsiram Bankar; Balasaheb Mahadev Erande
- Starring: Aniket Vishwasrao; Hardeek Joshi; Devika Daftardar
- Cinematography: Kumar Dongre
- Edited by: Kumar Dongre
- Music by: Avdhoot Gupte
- Production companies: Reliance Entertainment; Mayaka Mouli film production; Mumbai creation entertainment
- Distributed by: Reliance Entertainment
- Release date: 25 October 2024
- Running time: 120 minutes
- Country: India
- Language: Marathi

Karmayogi Abasaheb is a 2024 Marathi-language biographical drama film produced by Mayaka Mouli Film Production and Mumbai Creation Entertainment. The movie is directed by Altaf Dadasaheb Sheikh.

== Plot ==
The movie revolves around the life of Abasaheb Ganpatrao Deshmukh, a dedicated public servant. Abasaheb, who served as an eleven-time MLA and a two-time cabinet minister from the Sangola constituency, is remembered for his contributions to society and his unwavering service to the common people. The film explores his inspiring journey and impact on the lives of those he served.

== Cast ==
- Aniket Vishwasrao as MLA Ganpatrao Deshmukh
- Hardeek Joshi
- Devika Daftardar
- Prithvik Pratap
- Vijay Patkar
- Pradeep Velankar
- Suresh Vishwakarma
- Arbaaz Sheikh
- Tanaji Gulgunde
- Ahmed Deshmukh
- Vrindabal
- Nikita Sukhdev
- Ali Shaikh
- Altaf Dadasaheb Sheikh

== Production ==
The film Karmayogi Abasaheb is produced by Mayaka Mouli Film Production and Mumbai Creation Entertainment, with Maruti Tulsiram Bankar and Balasaheb Mahadev Erande as the producers. It is directed by Altaf Dadasaheb Sheikh, who has also written the story, screenplay, and dialogues. The music for the film is composed by Avdhoot Gupte, with lyrics penned by Altaf Dadasaheb Sheikh. Singers like Kunal Ganjawala and Manish Rajgiri have lent their voices to the film's songs. AmjadKhan Shaikh and Safar Shaikh serve as the executive producers, while Kumar Dongre has handled both the cinematography (DOP) and editing.
