= SuSheela SuJeet =

2025 Indian film by Prasad Oak

- Theatrical release poster
- Directed by: Prasad Oak
- Written by: Story: Prasad Oak; Screenplay and dialogue: Ajay Kamble
- Produced by: Prasad Oak; Manjiri Oak; Sanjay Memane; Nilesh Rathi; Swapnil Joshi
- Starring: Swapnil Joshi; Sonali Kulkarni
- Cinematography: Sanjay Memane
- Music by: Varun Likhate
- Production companies: Panchsheel Entertainments; Big Brain Productions
- Distributed by: Panorama Studios
- Release date: 18 April 2025
- Running time: 92 minutes
- Country: India
- Language: Marathi
- Box office: ₹8 crore

SuSheela SuJeet is a 2025 Indian Marathi-language suspense drama film directed and written by Prasad Oak. He also co-produces the film along with Manjiri Oak, Swapnil Joshi, Sanjay Memane, and Nilesh Rathi under the banner of Panchsheel Entertainments and Big Brain Productions. The film stars Swapnil Joshi and Sonali Kulkarni in the title roles. It is a story about two unlikely individuals who embark on a journey of self-discovery, exploring the unpredictable nature of life with humor, emotion, and surprises.

The film was announced in September 2024 and is released in theaters on April 18, 2025. Upon release, it received mixed to positive reviews, with some critics praised the direction and performances, others felt the film did not fully meet expectations.

== Plot ==
Susheela Sujeet revolves around an unexpected situation that brings together two strangers—a married woman and a plumber—for a few hours. Susheela lives with her husband Ramakant on the 36th floor of a high-rise apartment in Ambernath. One day, when their bathroom shower starts leaking and the bedroom door also requires fixing—since once locked, it cannot be opened from inside—Ramakant calls a plumber named Sujeet and then leaves for work. As Sujeet begins his repairs, a sudden gust of wind accidentally slams the bedroom door shut, locking Susheela and Sujeet inside. With both their mobile phones and the intercom left in the other room, they find themselves unable to call for help. Trapped on the 36th floor, with no way to alert anyone below, the two must navigate the awkward and unexpected predicament together.

== Cast ==
- Swapnil Joshi as Sujeet
- Sonali Kulkarni as Susheela Paranjape
- Prasad Oak as Nakate (astrologer)
- Sunil Tawde as Ramakant Paranjape
- Renuka Daftardar as Sujeet's mother
- Sunil Godbole as Joshi Kaka
- Radha Sagar
- Rajendra Shisatkar as Police Inspector
- Ajay Kamble
- Atharva Sudame (cameo as content creator)
- Namrata Sambherao (cameo as content creator)
- Amruta Khanvilkar as Aarti & Chiu Tai, cameo appearance in the song "Chiu Tai Chiu Tai Daar Ughad"
- Gashmeer Mahajani as Shana Kawala, cameo appearance in the song "Chiu Tai Chiu Tai Daar Ughad"

== Production ==
SuSheela SuJeet was officially announced on 24 September 2025, with the star cast kept under wraps. This marks the third collaboration between director Prasad Oak and cinematographer Sanjay Memane after Hirkani (2019) and Chandramukhi (2022). In November 2024, the lead cast was revealed, marking the first on-screen collaboration between Swapnil Joshi and Sonali Kulkarni. Principal photography began in the first week of November with the blessings of Shrimant Dagdusheth Halwai Ganpati in Pune. On 14 February 2025, coinciding with Valentine's Day, it was announced that Amruta Khanvilkar would also be part of the film, though details about her role remained undisclosed. A special item song, choreographed by Mehul Gadani, was shot in a single day. It marks Khanvilkar's first item number in her career, as she had previously only performed Lavani dance sequences in films.

== Soundtrack ==
The film's background score and music are composed by Varun Likhate. The first song, "Chiu Tai Chiu Tai Daar Ughad," featuring Amruta Khanvilkar and Gashmeer Mahajani, was released on 3 March 2025. The song received positive reviews, with a critic from Bollywood Hungama praised the duo's chemistry as the "highlight of the song," adding that "it promises to be a foot-tapping number, and Amruta's energetic performance will undoubtedly leave audiences spellbound." Another track, "Aata," was released on 7 April 2025, showcasing Prasad Oak in the style of a rapper alongside Omkar Nawate, Mandar Mokashi, Akshay Mhaske, Bhakti Shravan, Hrithik Dhanve, and others.

Track listing
No.	Title	Lyrics	Singer(s)	Length
1.	"Chiu Tai Chiu Tai Daar Ughad"	Mandar Cholkar	Pravin Kunwar, Kavita Raam	3:10
2.	"Naughty Naughty"	Mandar Cholkar	Mugdha Karhade, Abhay Jodhpurkar	4:00
3.	"Aata"	Mandar Cholkar	Prasad Oak, Varun Likhate	2:33
4.	"Aata – Susheela's Version"	Mandar Cholkar	Chetana Bhat	2:33
Total length:				12:16

== Marketing and release ==
The worldwide distribution and music rights of the film have been acquired by Panorama Studios. The first-look poster, along with the release date, was unveiled on 19 December 2024. The poster features the two leads visible through a keyhole. A special event was held at Ramnarain Ruia College in Mumbai for the launch of the song "Chiu Tai Chiu Tai Daar Ughad," attended by the cast and crew.

== Reception ==
=== Critical Response ===
Santosh Bhingarde of Sakal gave the film a more generous 3.5 stars out of 5 and commended Oak's direction and the ensemble cast, stating, "This is one such film that gives a good message while entertaining the audience." Kalpeshraj Kubal from Maharashtra Times awarded it 3 out of 5 stars, lauding the film's overall impact and added, "This film is a journey from 'silence' to 'acceptance' of oneself. A person is trapped in deep depression, confusion, and self-doubt; then why is it important for every 'Sushil Sujeet' to recognize the 'Sheelajeet' within himself?" Mihir Bhanage of The Times of India rated Susheela Sujeet 2.5 out of 5 stars, calling it a "decent attempt" and remarked, "After the premise of Susheela and Sujeet being locked in a room is established, the film suffers from a bad case of hum tum ek kamre mein band ho... aur story kho jaaye," pointing to the narrative's loss of momentum after a promising start. Chinmay Nakhwa appreciated the conviction behind the film, especially praising Sonali Kulkarni's standout performance and noted, "Such humour, a stunning act by Sonali Kulkarni and some spark in writing and execution by Prasad Oak make Susheela Sujeet a harmless affair," giving it a rating of 2.5 out of 5. A reviewer from Film Information summed it up succinctly: "Susheela Sujeet is a fair entertainer for its comedy."

=== Accolades ===
Awards	Year	Category	Recipient	Result	Ref
Lokshahi Marathi Chitra Sanman	2025	Best Comic Actor	Sunil Tawde	Pending	
Indian National Cine Academy	2026	Best Actress	Sonali Kulkarni	Nominated	
