= Punha Shivajiraje Bhosale =

2025 Marathi-language film

- Theatrical release poster
- Directed by: Mahesh Manjrekar
- Written by: Mahesh Manjrekar
- Produced by: Rahul Puranik; Rahul Sugandh
- Starring: Siddharth Bodke; Treesha Thosar; Prithvik Pratap; Siddharth Jadhav; Nityashree Dnyanlaxmi; Bhargav Jagtap; Shashank Shende; Sayaji Shinde; Mangesh Desai
- Cinematography: Abhimanyu Dange
- Edited by: Rahul Bhatankar
- Music by: Hitesh Modak
- Production companies: The Great Maratha Entertainment; Satya-Sai Films & Krizolh Films; Zee Studios
- Release date: 31 October 2025
- Running time: 163 minutes
- Country: India
- Language: Marathi
- Budget: ₹13 crore

Punha Shivajiraje Bhosale (transl. Shivajiraje Bhosale Once Again) is a 2025 Indian Marathi-language socio-political drama film directed by Mahesh Manjrekar. The film follows a young girl's fight for justice after her farmer father's suicide, which awakens the spirit of Chhatrapati Shivaji Maharaj. Returning to modern Maharashtra, he confronts corruption and inspires people—especially farmers and youth—to rise up and restore the ideals of Swarajya.

The film was theatrically released on 31 October 2025 and received a positive response from critics, but it underperformed at the box office and emerged as a box-office bomb. Made on a budget of ₹13 crore, it became the third most expensive Marathi film of all time.

== Cast ==
- Siddharth Bodke as Chatrapati Shivaji Maharaj
- Treesha Thosar as Rakhma
- Bhargav Jagtap as Krushna
- Vikram Gaikwad as MLA Bhagwan Popte
- Mangesh Desai as Dinkar Jagtap
- Shashank Shende as Tatya, Rakhma's grandfather
- Siddharth Jadhav as Usman Khillare
- Sandeep Juwatkar as Kanhoji
- Vijay Nikam as Manik
- Sayaji Shinde as Inspector Chavan
- Rohit Mane as Anwar
- Prithvik Pratap as Rakhma's father
- Nityashree Dnyanlaxmi as Rakhma's mother
- Medha Manjrekar
- Sanchi Bhoyar
- Payal Jadhav
- Nayan Jadhav
- Aakash Gharat as Vinay
- Gauri Ingawale

== Release ==
The film was theatrically released on 31 October 2025.

== Reception ==
=== Critical reception ===
Anub George of The Times of India gave 3 out of 5 stars and noted that the first half is emotional, whereas the second half features power-packed action and impactful dialogues. However, he felt the narrative becomes unfocused in the latter half due to the introduction of multiple antagonists, which detracts from the central issue and a solution-oriented resolution. Aunupama Gunde Pudhari gave the film 3 out of 5 stars and noted that, despite a slight excess in director Mahesh Manjrekar's creative liberties, the film effectively portrays the emotional reality of farmers. Santosh Bhingarde of Sakal awarded the film 4 out of 5 stars stars, praising Hitesh Modak's music and background score, Abhimanyu Dange's cinematography, and Mahesh Manjrekar's direction for maintaining a brisk narrative pace. Despite a few flaws, he described it as an engaging film that evokes Marathi pride while addressing the struggles of farmers.

Devendra Jadhav of Lokmat gave the film 3 out of 5 stars, stating that while the action scenes are thrilling, their length weakens the film's core theme. He also noted pacing issues and some technical flaws, adding that Hitesh Modak’s music supports the scenes but the songs are not very memorable. Kalpeshraj Kubal of Maharashtra Times gave the film 4 out of 5 stars, praising Siddharth Bodke’s portrayal of Chhatrapati Shivaji Maharaj and the performances of Trisha Thosar, Mangesh Desai, Vikram Gaikwad, and Siddharth Jadhav. He also highlighted the film’s strong symbolism and sharp commentary on Maharashtra's socio-political situation and farmers’ struggles. Reshma Raikwar of Loksatta praised the film's action sequences, brisk narrative, cinematography by Abhimanyu Dange, and sharp dialogues. She noted that the film reflects Mahesh Manjrekar's strong command over production and technical aspects, making it a grand film in his style.

== Controversy ==
Everest Entertainment LLP accused the makers of copying their 2009 blockbuster Mi Shivajiraje Bhosale Boltoy!. Everest claimed it owned the full intellectual property rights of the 2009 film after a 2013 agreement with director Mahesh Manjrekar, which allegedly transferred the rights to create prequels, sequels, or other derivative works to Everest. The company also issued a public legal notice in June 2025, asserting that it held the sole ownership of the film's intellectual property, including the script, music, negatives, and other underlying works, with rights valid worldwide for 60 years. The notice warned that no individual or company, including Manjrekar or other producers, had the authority to enter into agreements related to the film's rights without Everest's permission. The dispute arose in the context of the release of Manjrekar's Punha Shivajiraje Bhosale, intended as a spiritual sequel to Mi Shivajiraje Bhosale Boltoy. Everest Entertainment indicated it would pursue legal action in case of infringement.

Based on these claims, Everest approached the Bombay High Court seeking to stop the release of the new film. However, the Bombay High Court refused to halt the film's release on 31 October 2025. Justice Amit S. Jamsandekar ruled that Everest had delayed filing the case, even though it had known about the project since April 2025, and had approached the court only at the last moment before the film's release. The court observed that such last-minute attempts to restrain a film's release should be discouraged.

After reviewing the material presented by both sides, the court also held that there was no substantial reproduction of the earlier film. It noted that the two films differed in theme and concept, with the 2009 film focusing on the identity crisis of a common Maharashtrian man in Mumbai, while the new film dealt with issues such as farmers’ struggles and corruption. The court further stated that commonly used Marathi phrases and references to Chhatrapati Shivaji Maharaj could not be monopolised under copyright, as they form part of the region's shared cultural heritage. Consequently, the court declined to restrain the release of the film.
