= Abhinay Berde =

Indian actor (born 1997)

- Born: Abhinay Laxmikant Berde; 3 November 1997 (age 28); Mumbai, Maharashtra, India
- Education: Mithibai College
- Occupation: Actor
- Years active: 2017–present
- Parents: Laxmikant Berde (father); Priya Arun (mother)
- Family: Berde family

Abhinay Laxmikant Berde (born 3 November 1997) is an Indian actor who works in Marathi films. The son of Marathi actor Laxmikant Berde, he made his debut with Ti Saddhya Kay Karte and won the Filmfare Award Marathi and the MFK Award for best debut (male).

== Early life and family ==
Abhinay Berde was born on 3 November 1997 in Mumbai to Marathi film actor Laxmikant Berde and his wife Priya Arun. His sister Swanandi, is also an actress. He studied at Mithibai College in Vile Parle, Mumbai.

== Career ==
Abhinay Berde started his acting career in 2017 with Ti Saddhya Kay Karte and won a Filmfare Award for Best Male Debut at the Filmfare Awards Marathi for his performance. His next film Ashi Hi Aashiqui release after three years in 2019, made by Sachin Pilgaonkar, also done Rampaat same year. Close To You was the first film directed by him, produced under the banner of Shrimant Entertainment, starring actress Rutuja Shinde. The film received positive response from audience.

In 2022, he collaborate with Tejasswi Prakash in Mann Kasturi Re. Shristi Srivastav of DNP India praised his work in the film said "Abhinay Berde has a good appearance and performs well within the situation. He is yet to play a difficult role in his career, therefore the wait is still on." In 2023 he was seen in Bamboo as Chitamani Bhasme, alongside Vaishnavi Kalyankar, Shivaji Satam and Parth Bhalerao. He is joined Vishal Devrukhkar's Boyz franchise with Boyz 4. He was seen with Prathamesh Parab in Single, making their first film together. In April 2024, Berde made his Marathi theatre debut through Aajibai Jorat.

In 2025, he starred in Subhodh Khanolkar's Dashavatar film. Then he acted in Vada Paav, and Uttar.

== Filmography ==
=== Film ===
Key
†	Denotes films that have not yet been released

- Note: All movies are in Marathi, unless mentioned.

Year	Film	Role	Notes	Ref(s)
2017	Ti Saddhya Kay Karte	Anurag (young)	Debut	
2019	Ashi Hi Aashiqui	Swayam Deshmukh		
2019	Rampaat	Mithun Nagargoje		
2020	Close To You	—N/a	Director; Short film	
2022	Mann Kasturi Re	Siddhant Sawant		
2023	Bamboo	Chitamani "Chintya" Bhasme		
2023	Boyz 4	Kunal		
2023	Single	Abhinay		
2025	All Is Well	Amar Jagtap		
2025	Dashavatar	Monty Sarmalkar		
2025	Vadapav	Arjun Deshmukh		
2025	Uttar	Ninad Bhalerao		
TBA	Dishabhool †	TBA	Filming	
TBA	Kadhi Prem Kadhi Gondhal †	Raja Solkar		

=== Theatre ===
Year	Title	Director	Ref.
2024	Aaji Bai Jorat	Kshitij Patwardhan	

== Awards ==
Year	Award	Category	Work	Result	Ref(s)
2017	Filmfare Awards Marathi	Best Male Debut	Ti Saddhya Kay Karte	Won	
2017	Maharashtracha Favourite Kon?	Favourite Male Debut	Ti Saddhya Kay Karte	Won	
