= Mukkam Post Devach Ghar =

Indian Marathi-language film

- Theatrical release poster
- Directed by: Sanket Mane
- Written by: Sanket Mane; Sumit Giri
- Produced by: Maahesh Kumar Jaiswal; Kirti Jaiswal
- Starring: Myra Vaikul; Spruha Parab; Kalyani Mulye; Mangesh Desai; Usha Nadkarni
- Cinematography: Rohan Madkaikar
- Edited by: Dinesh Pujari
- Music by: Chinar - Mahesh; Background score: Aditya Bedekar
- Production companies: Keemaya Productions; Vadapav Films; ACDCAT
- Release date: 31 January 2025
- Country: India
- Language: Marathi

Mukkam Post Devach Ghar (transl. Destination: God's Home) is a 2025 Indian Marathi-language drama film directed and co-written by Sanket Mane. The film stars child actor Myra Vaikul in the lead role, supported by an ensemble cast including Spruha Parab, Mangesh Desai, Kalyani Mulye, Usha Nadkarni, Savita Malpekar and Prathamesh Parab. The story follows Jija, a young village girl on a heartfelt mission to send a letter to "God's Home," whose journey, filled with humor and emotions, unites her family and community in meaningful ways.

The film was released on 31 January 2025.

== Cast ==
- Myra Vaikul as Jija
- Spruha Parab as Shubhi
- Kalyani Mulye as Kalpana
- Mangesh Desai as Postman
- Usha Nadkarni as Sarpanch Aaji
- Madhavi Juvekar as Shubhi's Mother
- Prathamesh Parab as Ganya
- Savita Malpekar as Jija's Grandmother
- Resham Shrivardhan as Sangi
- Kamlesh Sawant as Police Inspector
- Rukmini Sutar as Aajibai
- Sachin Narkar as Bapya
- Pooja Sawant in a special appearance

== Production ==
The film was announced officially on 19 December 2024 with a poster unveiled at Siddhivinayak Temple in Mumbai.

== Soundtrack ==
The first song from the film, featuring Myra Vaikul and Spruha Parab, was released on 10 January 2025.

Track listing
No.	Title	Lyrics	Singer(s)	Length
1.	"Sundar Pariwani"	Chinar - Mahesh	Swara Bansode	2:45

== Release ==
The teaser of the film was launched on 6 January 2025. Several famous Marathi celebrities, like Milind Gawali, Sanju Rathod, Subodh Bhave, Amruta Khanvilkar and Prasad Khandekar, helped promote it. The trailer was unveiled on 17 January 2025, in the presence of actor-director Sachin Pilgaonkar.

== Reception ==
Mukkam Post Devach Ghar garnered positive reviews from critics, who lauded its emotional storytelling, Myra Vaikul's performance, and its poignant exploration of grief through a child's perspective, though some noted its slower pacing as a drawback. Chaitrali Joshi of Maharashtra Times called the film a "touching and heartfelt narrative" that effectively portrays a child's emotional journey, praising Vaikul's nuanced performance, but remarked that the film's pacing could feel sluggish at times. Santosh Bhigarde, writing for Sakal, described the film as a "sensitive and moving tale" that showcases Vaikul's ability to anchor the story, though he noted that its deliberate pace might not appeal to all viewers. Reshma Raikwar of Loksatta praised the film's unique premise and emotional depth, particularly highlighting Vaikul's expressive acting and the director's delicate handling of the subject, but suggested that tighter editing could have strengthened its impact.
