= Bhushan Patil =

Indian actor (born 1985)

- Born: Bhushan Patil; 3 January 1985 (age 41); Jalgaon, Village Velhane Kh
- Education: Civil Engineering
- Occupation: sports man
- Years active: 2014–present

Bhushan Patil (born 3 January 1996) is an Indian actor who appears in Marathi films

== Career ==
Bhushan Patil is a Marathi actor. Bhushan’s debut happened with the Balaji Telefilms Reality Show Kaun Jitega Bollywood Ka Ticket. Bhushan Patil was the winner of ETV Marathi reality show ‘Perfect Bachelor’ Bhushan Patil made his film debut with Marathi Film Olakh My Identity (2015) He has also done the music album with Sonu Kakkar, song – Akhiyan Nu Rehn De and Isheta Sarckar – Pyaar Ka Hangover

== Films ==
Year	Title	Notes
2014	Olakh My Identity	Lead Role
2016	Bernie	Lead Role
2016	Visarjan	Lead Role, Not Released Yet
2024	Shivrayancha Chhava	Lead Role
2024	Manmauji	Lead Role

== Music Albums ==
- Sonu Kakkar, song – Akhiyan Nu Rehn De
- Isheta Sarckar – Pyaar Ka Hangover

== Media image ==
Most Desirable Men of Maharashtra
Sponsor	Year	Rank	
Sponsor	Year	Film	Ref.
The Times of India, Maharashtra Times	2017	18	
The Times of India, Maharashtra Times	2019	9	
The Times of India, Maharashtra Times	2020	2	
