= Ti Saddhya Kay Karte =

2017 Marathi film

- Theatrical release poster
- Directed by: Satish Rajwade
- Screenplay by: Manaswini Lata Ravindra
- Story by: Satish Rajwade
- Produced by: Nikhil Sane; Arvind Jog; Pallavi Rajwade
- Starring: Ankush Chaudhari; Tejashree Pradhan; Abhinay Berde; Aarya Ambekar; Hruditya Rajwade; Nirmohi Agnihotri
- Cinematography: Suhas Gujrathi
- Edited by: Rahul Bhatnakar
- Music by: Avinash–Vishwajeet; Nilesh Moharir; Mandar Aapte
- Production company: Zee Studios
- Distributed by: Zee Studios
- Release date: 6 January 2017
- Country: India
- Language: Marathi
- Budget: est.₹4.5 crore
- Box office: est. ₹15−23 crore

Ti Saddhya Kay Karte (transl. What does she do these days) is a 2017 Marathi-language romantic drama film which is produced by Zee Studios and directed by Satish Rajwade. It stars Ankush Chaudhari and Tejashree Pradhan in lead roles. Abhinay Berde, son of actor Lakshmikant Berde and Aarya Ambekar play younger versions of the characters played by Ankush and Tejashree. The film was theatrically released on 6 January 2017.

Ti Saddhya Kay Karte's trailer attached with Aamir Khan's Dangal was released in cinemas in Maharashtra.

== Plot ==
A middle-aged Anurag wonders about his first love Tanvi, whom he has not seen in years. Back in college, he had wanted to confess his love for her. But they had a small quarrel where he yelled at her. She moved to Delhi and then to Boston. They marry different people. Anurag names his daughter after her. She comes to visit him after many years. They meet and he apologizes for his behaviour in college. They part after making a promise to stay friends and in touch.

== Cast ==
- Ankush Chaudhari as Anurag (Anya)
  - Abhinay Berde as young Anurag (Anya)
  - Hruditya Rajwade as kid Anurag (Anya)
- Sumitkumar as Abhinav (Abhi dada)
- Tejashri Pradhan as Tanvi
  - Aarya Ambekar as young Tanvi
  - Nirmohi Agnihotri as kid Tanvi
- Urmila Kanitkar as Radhika
- Prasad Barve as Pavya
- Sanjay Mone as Anurag's Father
- Sukanya Kulkarni-Mone as Anurag's mother
- Tushar Dalvi as Tanvi's father
- Anuradha Rajadhyaksha as Tanvi's mother
- Isha Phadke as Mohini
- Nitesh Kalbande as young Pavya
- Rajas Bakshi
- Tanvi Joshi

== Release ==
Ti Saddhya Kay Karte released on 6 January 2017 with English subtitles in Maharashtra, Gujarat, Goa, Madhya Pradesh, Delhi, Karnataka, Andhra Pradesh and Telangana.

== Box office ==
The film collected around ₹6 crore (US$620,000) in first weekend. The film has grossed around ₹15 crore (US$1.6 million) within 14 days and surpassed ₹20 crore (US$2.1 million) mark within 3 weeks. The film ended up grossing ₹22.54 crore (US$2.3 million) at the box office.

== Soundtrack ==
Ti Saddhya Kay Karte

Soundtrack album by Various
- Released: 16 December 2016
- Genre: Feature film soundtrack
- Length: 30:35
- Language: Marathi
- Label: Zee Music Company

The songs for the film were composed by various artists like Nilesh Moharir, Avinash-Vishwajeet and Mandar Aapte.

No.	Title	Lyrics	Music	Singer(s)	Length
1.	"Hrudayat Vaje Something"	Vishwajeet Joshi	Avinash-Vishwajeet	Vidhit Patankar	04:40
2.	"Parikatha"	Ashwini Shende	Nilesh Moharir	Kaushik Deshpande	03:55
3.	"Jara Jara"	Ashwini Shende	Nilesh Moharir	Hrishikesh Ranade, Aarya Ambekar	04:55
4.	"Kitida Navyane"	Devyani Karve-Kothari	Mandar Aapte	Mandar Aapte, Aarya Ambekar	03:45
5.	"Hrudayat Vaje Something (Female Version)"	Vishwajeet Joshi	Avinash-Vishwajeet	Aarya Ambekar	04:40
6.	"Jara Jara (Reprise)"	Ashwini Shende	Nilesh Moharir	Aarya Ambekar	04:00
7.	"Hrudayat Vaje Something (Male Version)"	Vishwajeet Joshi	Avinash-Vishwajeet	Rohit Raut	04:40
Total length:					30:35

== See also ==
- Highest grossing Marathi films
- List of most expensive Indian films
