= Prithvik Pratap =

Indian actor and comedian

- Born: Prithvik Pratap Kamble; 30 November 1991 (age 34)
- Education: Kirti M. Doongursee College
- Occupations: Actor; comedian
- Years active: 2007–present
- Known for: Maharashtrachi Hasyajatra
- Spouse: Prajakta Waikul (m. 2024)

Prithvik Pratap Kamble (born 30 November 1991) is an Indian film, television, and theatre actor, and comedian. He is best known for the Marathi-language television comedy show Maharashtrachi Hasyajatra.

== Career ==
Prithvik Pratap has worked in Marathi serials, films, plays, short films, and web series, portraying pivotal roles in various experimental and commercial dramas. He has been a part of Marathi serials such as Aambat Goad, Jaago Mohan Pyare, H.M. Bane T.M. Bane. Prithvik was a ground breaking performer in the show Maharashtrachi Hasyajatra on Sony Marathi, where he won the second season. Additionally, he has featured in web series like Back Benchers and Lakhon Mein Ek–2. In 2014, he appeared in Pyaar Vali Love Story.

Prithvik was seen in a pivotal role in Red Chillies Entertainment's venture, Class of '83, directed by Atul Sabharwal. Prithvik Pratap is collaborating with Prathamesh Parab in Delivery Boy, a 2024 comedy-drama film that depicts Dr. Amrita Deshmukh's quest to start a fertility center in a bungalow, providing surrogacy for hopeful mothers. He also played a supporting role in Phullwanti. He was played role of Advocate Prithviraj Chavan in Karmayogi Abasaheb. In 2025, he acted in Hardik Shubhechha, Mumbai Local and Punha Shivajiraje Bhosale.

== Personal life ==
He was born on 30 November 1991 in Mumbai. He is married on 25 October 2024 to long time girlfriend Prajakta Waikul after 11 year's of dating.

== Filmography ==
=== Film ===
Key
†	Denotes films that have not yet been released

Year	Title	Role	Language	Notes	Ref(s)
2014	Pyaar Vali Love Story	Unknown	Marathi		
2016	Back Benchers	Ganya	Marathi	TV Mini series	
2018	Wake Up		—N/a	Short film	
2019	Lakhon Mein Ek	Raja Babu's Chela	Hindi	TV series	
2020	Class of '83	Janardan Surve	Hindi		
2024	Delivery Boy	Chochya	Marathi		
2024	Phullwanti	Chimanrao	Marathi		
2024	Karmayogi Abasaheb	Adv. Prithviraj Chavan	Marathi		
2024	Despatch	Jeethu Vishwas	Hindi		
2025	Hardik Shubhechha	Ravi	Marathi		
2025	Mumbai Local	Jeet	Marathi		
2025	Punha Shivajiraje Bhosale	Rakhma's father	Marathi		
TBA	Taboo †	TBA	Marathi		

=== Television ===
Year	Title	Role	Notes	Language	Ref(s)
2012–2014	Aambat Goad			Marathi	
2017–2018	Jaago Mohan Pyare	Rahul Patil		Marathi	
2019–present	Maharashtrachi Hasyajatra	Contestant	2019 winner	Marathi	

=== Music video ===
Year	Title	Language	Singer(s)	Ref(s)
2024	"Pori Tujhya Navacha Go"	Marathi	Sonali Sonavane; Pravin Done	
