= Uttar (film) =

2025 Indian Marathi-language film

- Directed by: Kshitij Patwardhan
- Written by: Kshitij Patwardhan
- Produced by: Bavesh Janavlekar; Umesh Kumar Bansal; Mayur Hardas; Sampada Wagh
- Starring: Abhinay Berde; Renuka Shahane; Hruta Durgule; Nirmiti Sawant
- Cinematography: Amalendu Chaudhary
- Edited by: Mayur Hardas
- Music by: Amitraj; Tejas Joshi; Aseem Kurhekar; Prateek Kelkar
- Production companies: Zee Studios; Jackpot Entertainmentss
- Release date: 12 December 2025
- Running time: 118 minutes
- Country: India
- Language: Marathi
- Box office: ₹3 crore

Uttar is a 2025 Indian Marathi-language drama film written and directed by Kshitij Patwardhan and produced by Zee Studios and Jackpot Entertainmentss. The film stars Abhinay Berde, Renuka Shahane, Hruta Durgule and Nirmiti Sawant in prominent roles.

Uttar was theatrically released on 12 December 2025 in Maharashtra. It is streaming on Zee5 from 13 Feb 2026. It reflections on how artificial intelligence can impact the relationship of a mother and child.

== Release ==
The film was theatrically released on 12 December 2025. and digitally released on13 February 2026 on ZEE5.

== Reception ==
Santosh Bhingarde of Sakal gave 3.5/5 stars and says "the film has light, pleasant dialogues, good cinematography, and despite a few flaws, it’s a fresh, relevant story about the gentle, loving bond between a mother and son." Rasika Shinde-Paul of Kalakruti Media gave 4/5 stars and placed a high value on emotional impact and acting by Renuka Shahane and Hruta Durgule and expressed that this film had a very powerful and emotional impact on him. Among other elements, she noted that this film ahd excellent music and excellent direction. The film's representation of human motherhood versus AI motherhood; the emotional story of this film should not be missed, even though the concepts surrounding AI could have been explained in a more simplified manner. Nandini Ramnath of Scroll.in says "Uttar is slow to take off and a bit self-conscious at times. However, Patwardhan’s patience with his actors and his tendency to let scenes roll out in full does produce a fair share of moist-eyed moments." Anupama Gunde of Pudhari gave 4/5 stars and says "the film is a deeply emotional story, showing how technology cannot replace a mother’s love. The performances are strong, and the film is a touching reminder for today’s generation to value emotions over tech."

== Soundtrack ==
No.	Title	Singers	Composers	Lyrics	Length
1	Ho aai!	Radhika Bhide	Amitraj	Kshitij Patwardhan	3:31
2	Asen mi	Ronkini Gupta	Tejas Joshi	Kshitij Patwardhan	2:49
3	Mechanical Nanya	—N/a	Aseem Kuhekar, Prateek Kelkar	—N/a	4:35

== Awards ==
Year	Awards	Category	Recipient	Results	Notes
2026	Filmfare Awards Marathi	Best Film (Critics')	Uttar	Nominated	
2026	Filmfare Awards Marathi	Best Actor (Critics')	Abhinay Berde	Nominated	
2026	Filmfare Awards Marathi	Best Actress (Critics')	Renuka Shahane	Nominated	
2026	Filmfare Awards Marathi	Best Story	Kshitij Patwardhan	Nominated	
2026	Filmfare Awards Marathi	Best Playback Singer (Female)	Ronkini Gupta	Nominated	For song "Asen Mi"
2026	Filmfare Awards Marathi	Best Playback Singer (Female)	Radhika Bhide	Nominated	For song "Ho Aai"
2026	Filmfare Awards Marathi	Best Lyrics	Kshitij Patwardhan	Nominated	
