= Aniket Vishwasrao =

Indian film actor (born 1981)

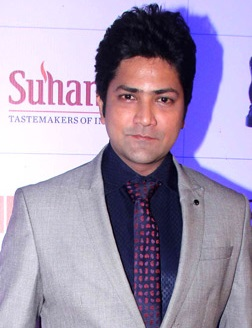
- Aniket Vishwasrao at Marathi filmfare awards
- Born: Aniket Vishwasrao; 7 May 1981 (age 45); Mumbai, Maharashtra, India
- Occupation: Actor
- Years active: 2004–present
- Spouse: Sneha Chavan (m. 2018)

Aniket Vishwasrao is an Indian actor. He is best known for his work in Marathi Cinema. He made his screen debut in Sudhir Mishra's Chameli and first appeared in Marathi cinema with Lapoon Chhapoon (2007). In 2011, he achieved popularity with the release of Fakt Ladh Mhana.

== Personal life ==
Vishwasrao was educated at St. Francis High School, Borivali in Mumbai and continued his studies at M. L. Dahanukar College. For many years, he was in a relationship with Marathi actress Pallavi Subhash. In December 2014, Subhash confirmed their split.

== Career ==
Vishwasrao has appeared in both TV serials and films, though he is best known for his role as Alex in Mahesh Manjarekar's Fakt Ladh Mhana, which was directed by cinematographer Sanjay Jadhav. Aniket has also done a role in film Story Hai Pan Khari Hai.

== Filmography ==
Year	Title	Language	Role	Notes
2003	Chameli	Hindi	Raja	Hindi Debut
2004	Hava Aney Dey	Hindi	Arjun	Lead Role
2007	Lapoon Chhapoon	Marathi	Aniket	Marathi Debut
2008	Guilty	Marathi	Anish	
2008	Saavariya.Com	Marathi	Jayesh Prabhu Desai	
2009	Rangee Berangi	Marathi	Ganesh Choudhary	
2010	Aaghaat	Marathi	Amol	
2010	Ladigodi	Marathi	Anil	
2011	Fakt Ladh Mhana	Marathi	Alex	
2012	Spandan	Marathi		
2012	No Entry Pudhe Dhoka Aahey	Marathi	Sunny	
2012	Aghor	Marathi		
2013	Yeda	Marathi		
2013	Tendulkar Out	Marathi	Lefty	
2014	Dhamak	Marathi		
2014	Bhakarkhadi 7 km	Marathi		
2014	Bol Baby Bol	Marathi	Rahul	
2014	Aandhali Koshimbir	Marathi	Ranga	
2014	Poshter Boyz	Marathi	Arjun	
2015	Story Hai Pan Khari Hai	Marathi		
2015	Hum Baja Bajaa Denge	Hindi film	Neil	
2016	Poshter Girl	Marathi	Bajrang Dudhbhate	Nominated Filmfare Award for Best Supporting Actor – Marathi
2017	Baghtos Kay Mujra Kar	Marathi	Pandurang Shinde	Nominated Filmfare Award for Best Supporting Actor – Marathi
2017	Bus Stop	Marathi	Deven	
2020	Choricha Mamla	Marathi	Abhinandan	
2024	Danka Hari Namacha	Marathi	Jana	
2024	Karmayogi Abasaheb	Marathi	MLA Ganpatrao Deshmukh	
2025	Better Half Chi Love Story	Marathi	Bhagwan Kale	

=== Television ===
Year	Title	Role
	Super Women	Anchor
	Nayak	Rohan (young)
	Oon Paus	Sagar
	Kalat Nakalat	Gaurav
	Eka Peksha Ek	Anchor
	Maharashtracha Superstar	Anchor
	Bigg Boss Marathi (season 2)	Guest

=== Theatre ===
- Love Bird
- Suryachi pille
- Nakalat Saare Ghadale
- A Perfect Murder
- Kon Mhanta Takka Dila
- Don wajun Bavis Minitanni
