= Follower (film) =

2023 Marathi-language movie

- Theatrical release poster
- Directed by: Harshad Nalawade
- Written by: Harshad Nalawade
- Produced by: Vinay Mishra; Raghavan Bharadwaj; Preety Ali; Harshad Nalawade; Charulata Maitra; Pratik Moitro; Anubhav KR; Pallavi Rohatgi; Maulik Sharma
- Starring: Raghu Prakash; Donna Munshi; Harshad Nalawade
- Cinematography: Saket Gyani
- Edited by: Maulik Sharma
- Production companies: Orangepixel Studios; Visica Films; A HumaraMovie; Causality Films production
- Release dates: 29 January 2023 (International Film Festival Rotterdam); 21 March 2025 (India)
- Running time: 100 minutes
- Country: India
- Languages: Marathi; Hindi; Kannada; English
- Budget: ₹22 lakh

Follower is a 2023 Indian Marathi (Note: The film is primarily in Marathi, with some dialogues in Kannada, Hindi, and English.) drama film written and directed by Harshad Nalawade in his feature film debut. The film features Raghu Prakash, Donna Munshi, and Nalawade in leading roles. The film follows a Marathi-speaking youth in Belagavi who becomes increasingly radicalised while working for a Marathi political leader amid the border dispute between Karnataka and Maharashtra. His political beliefs eventually create tensions with his close friends.

The film was premiered on 29 January 2023 in International Film Festival Rotterdam and many other domestic and international film festivals and was theatrically released on 21 March 2025. The film was produced on a modest budget of ₹22 lakh but could not recover its investment.

== Plot ==
The film follows Raghu, a young Marathi-speaking man living in Belagavi, a city at the center of the long-running border dispute between Karnataka and Maharashtra. Raghu works in the IT cell of a Marathi political leader, spreading online propaganda about the alleged mistreatment of Marathi speakers.

As political tensions and language-based identity issues grow, Raghu becomes increasingly radicalised. His strong ideological beliefs begin to strain his friendship with two close friends, creating emotional and ideological conflicts. The film explores themes of identity, friendship, political polarisation, and the feeling of alienation within one's own homeland.

== Cast ==
- Raghu Prakash as Raghavendra "Raghu" Pawar
- Donna Munshi as Parveen Mujawar
- Harshad Nalawade as Sachin Sanikop

== Release ==
=== Film festivals ===
Follower was officially selected for several domestic and international film festivals in 2023. The film was screened at the International Film Festival Rotterdam, the International Festival of Independent Cinema Off Camera in Krakow, the New York Indian Film Festival, and the Noordelijk Film Festival in the Netherlands. It was also selected for major Indian festivals including the JIO MAMI Mumbai Film Festival, the Dharamshala International Film Festival, and the International Film Festival of Kerala.

=== Theatrical ===
The film was theatrically released on 21 March 2025.

== Reception ==
=== Critical reception ===
Saibal Chatterjee of NDTV gave 4 out of 5 stars and wrote "Follower is a finely textured, gentle essay, even non-judgmental in a way that such 'argumentative' films rarely are, but the statement that it makes about the perils of radicalisation is unwaveringly firm and pointed." Sneha Bengani of CNBC TV18 praised Follower for its sharp social commentary and realistic portrayal of everyday harassment and social hypocrisy, highlighting its multilingual setting and symbolic storytelling.

Mihir Bhanage of The Times of India gave the film 3.5 out of 5 stars, describing it as a portrayal of contemporary social realities, particularly how youth can be influenced by baseless allegations from those in power. He noted that Harshad Nalawade connects multiple subplots to build a cause-and-effect narrative that culminates in the climax. Debanjan Dhar of Outlook gave the film 4 out of 5 stars, praising Harshad Nalawade's balanced storytelling and Raghu Prakash's nuanced performance, describing Follower as a focused and confident debut that examines the protagonist's ideological transformation.

Alaka Sahani of The Indian Express gave the film 3.5 out of 5 stars, noting that it portrays how unemployed youth in small towns can be drawn into hate-driven narratives on social media. She praised Harshad Nalawade's mature storytelling, the film's multilingual setting in Belagavi, and the performances of Raghu Prakash and Donna Munshi.

== Controversy ==
In March 2025, Members of the Karnataka Rakshana Vedike halted a screening of Follower at an INOX Cinema in Belagavi, alleging that the film could disturb peace due to its depiction of the Kannada–Marathi linguistic dispute. Some activists also demanded a ban on the film, claiming it misrepresented facts and could provoke tensions between Kannada and Marathi-speaking communities. Director Harshad Nalawade and the film's associates responded by urging critics to watch the film before forming an opinion, stating that it is a work of fiction centered on the lives of three friends.
