= Zapuk Zupuk =

- Theatrical Release Poster
- Directed by: Kedar Shinde
- Written by: Omkar Mangesh Datt; Rushikesh Turai
- Produced by: Jyoti Deshpande; Bela Kedar Shinde
- Starring: Suraj Chavan; Jui Bhagwat; Indraneil Kamat; Hemant Pharande
- Cinematography: Udaysingh Mohite
- Edited by: Mayur Hardas
- Music by: Kratex; Kunal-Karan; Chandan Kamble; Akshay Garadkar
- Production companies: Jio Studios; Kedar Shinde Productions
- Release date: 25 April 2025
- Country: India
- Language: Marathi
- Box office: ₹1.24 crore

Zapuk Zupuk is a 2025 Indian Marathi-language comedy-drama film directed by Kedar Shinde and produced by Jyoti Deshpande and Bela Kedar Shinde. It stars Suraj Chavan, Jui Bhagwat, Indraneil Kamat, Hemant Pharande. The film was theatrically released on 25 April 2025.

== Cast ==
- Suraj Chavan as Suraj
- Jui Bhagwat as Narayani Mohite
- Indraneil Kamat as Shekhar
- Hemant Pharande as Rajkumar
- Milind Gawali as Punjabrao Mohite
- Deepali Pansare as Vrundha Mohite
- Pushkaraj Chirputkar
- Payal Jadhav

== Production ==
=== Development ===
The concept for the film was originally developed by Kedar Shinde in 2004. While serving as Head of Programming at Colors Marathi in 2024, Shinde identified a narrative device in the real-life figure of Suraj Chavan, whom he encountered during Bigg Boss Marathi Season 5. The film was formally announced on 7 October 2024 by Nikhil Sane of Jio Studios and Kedar Shinde during the grand finale of Bigg Boss Marathi Season 5, in which Suraj Chavan was declared the winner.

=== Filming ===
Principal photography commenced in late December 2024. The film was shot in a single schedule in Wai, a town in the Satara district of Maharashtra. Filming concluded on 6 March 2025.

=== Marketing ===
The motion poster of the film was released on 1 February 2025. This was followed by the release of the official teaser on 18 March 2025. The theatrical trailer was unveiled by actor Riteish Deshmukh on 11 April 2025.

== Soundtrack ==
Track List
No.	Title	Music	Singer(s)	Length
1.	"Zapuk Zupuk"	Kratex	Patya The Doc	02:35
2.	"Poracha Bajar Uthala Ra"	Kunal-Karan	Karan Sawant	03:19
3.	"Vajiv Dada"	Chandan Kamble	Chandan Kamble & Dnyaneshwari Kamble	03:37

== Release ==
Zapuk Zupuk released in theatres on 25 April 2025.
