= Samir Choughule =

Indian actor & comedian (born 1973)

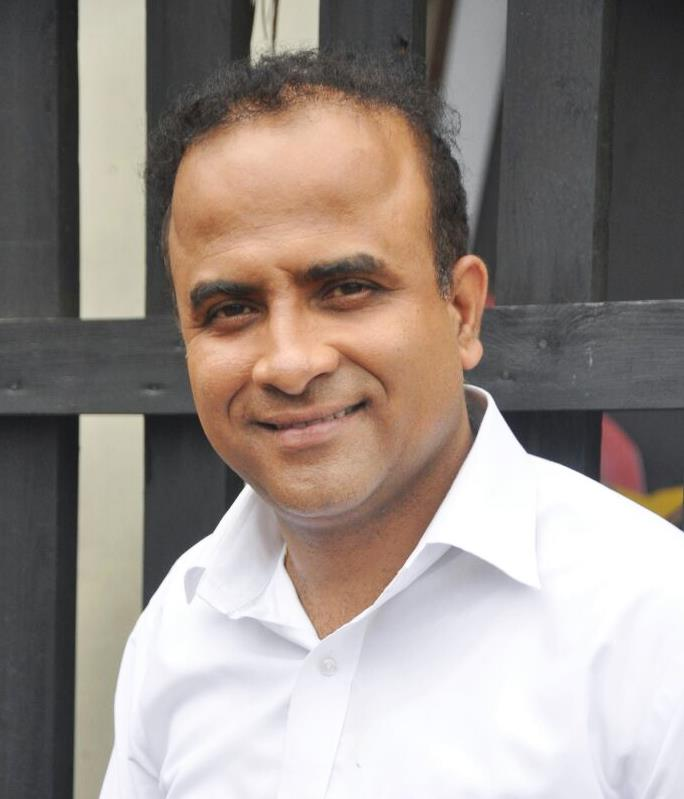
- Choughule in 2016
- Born: Samir Diwakar Choughule; 29 June 1973 (age 53); Bombay (now Mumbai), Maharashtra, India
- Occupations: Actor; writer; comedian
- Years active: 1993–present
- Known for: Various roles in Maharashtrachi hasya jatra
- Spouse: Kavita Choughule (m. 1997)

Samir Diwakar Choughule (born 29 June 1973) is an Indian actor and writer from Mumbai. He is better known for his comedy roles, style and slapstick performance. From daily soaps to comedy shows, from theater plays to movies, Samir has acted in Marathi, Hindi and English shows. He is currently known for his role in Maharashtrachi Hasyajatra being telecasted on Sony Marathi.

== Life and career ==
Choughule did his schooling in Shailendra Education Society and later completed his graduation from M L Dahanukar College of Commerce in 1993. He was interested in sports, but started acting after his acting adventures in school and college gave him success and encouragement. After completing his education, Samir worked in Mumbai and later took a full-time acting career in 2002. Since then has acted in various dramas, TV serials and movies. He is a team lead on Maharashtrachi Hasya Jatra comedy show.

Choughule is also a regular contributor to Saamana e-paper under the column "Fulora" where he writes about the various flavors of life.

== Personal life ==
Choughule grew up in Virar–Nallasopara area. He is married to Kavita and the couple lives in the same area.

== Filmography ==
Samir has appeared in lead role as well as special appearance in a few marathi Indian movies:

| Year | Film | Language | Role | Notes |
|---|---|---|---|---|
| 2005 | Kaydyacha Bola | Marathi | Thambi | Special appearance |
| 2008 | Mumbai Meri Jaan | Hindi | | |
| 2013 | Aajcha Divas Majha | Marathi | Satam | |
| 2015 | Vakratunda Mahakaaya | Marathi | Secretary | |
| 2015 | A Paying Ghost | Marathi | Ganpule | |
| 2016 | Mumbai Time | Marathi | | |
| 2019 | Vikun Taak | Marathi | | |
| 2021 | Pandu | Marathi | | Dialogue writer |
| 2022 | Chandramukhi | Marathi | Battasha | |
| 2023 | Bamboo | Marathi | Shashikant Prabhulkar | |
| 2023 | Jaggu Ani Juliet | Marathi | Mr. Nimkar | |
| 2024 | Hoy Maharaja | Marathi | Jignes | |
| 2024 | Phullwanti | Marathi | Wamanrao | |
| 2025 | Gulkand | Marathi | Makrand Dhawale | |

== Theater work ==
Samir is an actor in Marathi Theater and below are a few plays where he has acted in:

1. Asa Mi Asa Mi
2. Varya Varchi varat
3. Vyakti Ani Valli
4. Yada kadachit
5. Chalre Bhoplya Tunuk Tunuk
6. Balak Palak
7. Shri Bai Samartha
8. Carry On Heavens (Hinglish drama by Bharat Dabholkar)
9. Best of Bottoms Up (English Drama)
10. Hyancha Kaay Karaaycha
11. Samya Samya Maifilit Mazya

== TV appearances ==
Samir has also acted in a few TV serials:

1. Tikal te Political (Political satire by Chandrakant Kulkarni)
2. Aambat God (Star Pravah)
3. Honar Soon Mi Hya Gharchi (Zee Marathi)
4. Comedychi Bullet Train (Colors Marathi)
5. Kunku (Zee Marathi)
6. Eka Lagnachi Dusri Goshta (Sameer)
7. Aajke Shriman Shrimati (Hindi TV Serial)
8. Maharashtrachi Hasyajatra (Sony Marathi)
9. Saare Tujhyachsathi (Sony Marathi)
10. Assa Maher Nako Ga Baai! (Dhongi Baba)
11. Post Office Ughade Aahe (Nirgudkar)

== Awards and recognition ==
1. Sanskruti Kaladarpan Natya Vibhag – 2016
2. Zee Natya Gourav Puraskar 2015 – Best Comedy Actor for drama – Balak-Palak
