= Prathamesh Parab =

Indian actor (born 1993)

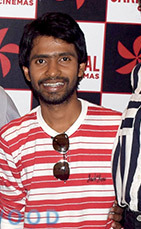
- Born: 29 November 1993 (age 32); Mumbai, Maharashtra, India
- Occupation: Actor
- Years active: 2012–present
- Known for: Timepass; Timepass 2
- Spouse: Kshitija Ghosalkar (m. 2024)

Prathamesh Parab (born 29 November 1993) is an Indian actor who works primarily in Marathi-language films. He made his acting debut with Balak-Palak in 2013 before stepping into the lead role in Timepass. The following year, he clinched the Star-Studded Annual Life Ok Screen Awards in 2014.

== Education ==
Parab did his schooling at the M.L Dahanukar College of Commerce in Mumbai where he graduated with a Bachelor in Banking and Insurance.

== Personal life ==
In February 2024, he married long time girlfriend Kshitija Ghosalkar.

== Filmography ==
=== Feature films ===
Year	Title	Role	Language	Ref(s)
2013	Balak Palak	Vishu	Marathi	
2014	Timepass	Dagdu Shantaram Parab	Marathi	
2015	Timepass 2	Dagdu Shantaram Parab	Marathi	
2015	Drishyam	Jose	Hindi	
2015	Urfi	Deva	Marathi	
2016	35% Kathavar Pass	Sairaj	Marathi	
2016	Lalbaugchi Rani	Andy	Marathi	
2017	Ziprya	Aslam	Marathi	
2018	Khajoor Pe Atke	Rocky Dilwala	Hindi	
2019	Khichik	Loafer	Marathi	
2019	Takatak	Thoke	Marathi	
2020	Doctor Doctor	Keshav (Kishya)	Marathi	
2021	OMG	Jaggu	Marathi	
2021	Darling	Tushar	Marathi	
2021	Ek Number Super	Baburao (Babya)	Marathi	
2022	Timepass 3	Dagdu Shantaram Parab	Marathi	
2022	Anya	Sartaj	Marathi; Hindi	
2022	Takatak 2	Ganesh (Ganya)	Marathi	
2022	Drishyam 2	Jose	Hindi	
2023	Taaza Khabar	Raja Chaturvedi aka Peter	Hindi	
2023	Dhishkyaoon	Sanya	Marathi	
2024	Delivery Boy	Bhau	Marathi	
2024	Hoy Maharaja	Ramya	Marathi	
2024	Shri Ganesha	Tiklya	Marathi	
2025	Mukkam Post Devach Ghar	Ganesh (Ganya)	Marathi	
2025	Gadi No. 1760	Abhi	Marathi	
2025	Mumbai Local	Ashish	Marathi	
2025	Mamta Child Factory	Digambar Kantode	Marathi	
2025	Gotya Gangster	Gotya	Marathi	

== Awards ==
Year	Awards	Category	Work	Result	Ref.
2014	20th Annual Life OK Screen Awards	Most Promising Newcomer	Drishyam	Won	
2023	2023 Filmfare OTT Awards	Best Supporting Actor (Male)	Taaza Khabar	Nominated	
2015	Maharashtracha Favourite Kon?	MFK Award for Favourite Actor	Timepass	Nominated	
2019	Maharashtracha Favourite Kon?	MFK Award for Favourite Actor	Takatak	Nominated	
2023	Maharashtracha Favourite Kon?	MFK Award for Favourite Actor	Timepass 3	Nominated	
