= Abhijeet Chavan =

Indian actor

- Born: 23 April 1975 (age 50); Lalbaug, Mumbai, Maharashtra, India
- Occupation: Actor
- Notable work: Role of "Master", Comedy Express series
- Spouse: Sayogeeta Chavan
- Children: 2

Abhijeet Chavan is a Marathi and Hindi film, television and stage actor, notable for his comic roles in Marathi theatre, film and television industry in India. He played the role of Shridhar Mahajan in the Colors Marathi's daily soap Asa Saasar Surekh Bai. He also works in the web series known as Struggler Saala, available on YouTube.

== Career ==
=== Television ===
He is famous for the character "Master", supported by Ashish Pawar who plays "Bandu" the student and many more in the Marathi comedy series, Comedy Express. His punch line, "Benchvar.... Bench var ubha Karen", is famous with viewers.

=== Marathi movies ===
He appeared in the movies Shan (2006), Gojiri (2007) and Majha Naav Shivaji (2016). He Also appeared in Marathi Movie Lek Asavi Tar Ashi (2024) and Hoy Maharaja (2024).

=== Hindi movies ===
He played a bouncer in the movie Split Wide Open (1999). He also played an auto rickshaw driver in the scene which included three Mumbai auto rickshaws that show up in Germany and jump on a police car to rescue / save Himesh Reshammiya in Aap Kaa Surroor: The Moviee – The Real Luv Story (2007).
