= Maharashtra Times =

Marathi language newspaper in India

- Type: Daily newspaper
- Format: Broadsheet
- Owner: The Times Group
- Publisher: The Times Group
- Editor: Parag Karandikar
- Founded: 18 June 1962; 63 years ago
- Language: Marathi
- Headquarters: Mumbai, Maharashtra
- Circulation: 1,000,000 daily
- Sister newspapers: The Economic Times; Navbharat Times; The Times of India; Ei Samay; Mumbai Mirror; Vijaya Karnataka
- Website: maharashtratimes.com

Maharashtra Times (Marathi: महाराष्ट्र टाइम्स), colloquially referred to as 'Ma Ta' (मटा) from its Marathi initialism, is a Marathi newspaper based in Mumbai, India. It is one of the largest selling daily Marathi newspapers in the country and part of The Times of India group.

According to the IRS 2005 survey, Maharashtra Times enjoys the second largest readership in Mumbai. Other than The Times of India, Maharashtra Times is the only newspaper in Mumbai which has more than one million readers in the city.

== Editions ==
Edition	Started	Closed	Supplements
Ahmednagar	21 November 2013	13 May 2020	Ahmednagar Times
Jalgaon	20 August 2013	13 May 2020	Jalgaon Times
Kolhapur	21 August 2012	31 May 2020	Kolhapur Times
Chhatrapati Sambhajinagar	9 December 2011	Ongoing	Chhatrapati Sambhajinagar Times
Mumbai	18 June 1962	Ongoing	Mumbai Times; Vasai-Virar Plus
Nagpur	12 June 2012	Ongoing	Nagpur Plus
Nashik	8 June 2011	Ongoing	Nashik Plus
Pune	7 January 2011	Ongoing	Pune Plus; Pimpri-Chinchwad Plus
Thane	18 February 2015	Ongoing	Thane Plus; Navi Mumbai Plus

== Supplements ==
1. MATA Wealth (Monday)
2. Times Property (Saturday)
3. Maifal (Saturday)
4. Samvad (Sunday)

=== Discontinued supplements ===
1. Pune Times, Nashik Times, Nagpur Times, Thane Vishesh (superseded by newer supplements)

=== Ongoing supplements ===
Supplement	Started	Days
Mumbai Times	18 June 1962	Mon-Sat
C. Sambhajinagar Times	9 December 2011	Mon-Sat
Nagpur Plus	1 April 2016	Mon-Sat
Nashik Plus	1 April 2016	Mon-Sat
Vasai-Virar Plus	16 March 2020	Mon-Sat
Navi Mumbai Plus	16 March 2020	Daily
Pimpri-Chinchwad Plus	9 December 2024	Daily
Pune Plus	8 January 2018	Daily
Thane Plus	14 April 2016	Daily
