= List of Marathi films of 2026 =

This is a list of Marathi (Indian Marathi-language) films that are scheduled to be released in the year 2026.

== Box office collection ==
The highest-grossing Marathi films released in 2026, by worldwide box office gross revenue, are as follows:

*	Denotes film still running in cinemas

#	Implies that the film is multilingual and the gross collection figure includes the worldwide collection of the other simultaneously filmed version.

Highest worldwide gross of 2026
Rank	Title	Production company	Worldwide gross	Ref.
1	Raja Shivaji (Note: The film was produced in Marathi and Hindi simultaneously.)	Mumbai Film Company; Jio Studios	₹130 crore #	
2	Deool Band 2	Vatvruksha Production	₹100.50 crore	
3	Krantijyoti Vidyalay Marathi Madhyam	Chalchitra Mandalee	₹32 crore	
4	Tumbadchi Manjula	Zee Studios	₹19.34 crore	
5	Aga Aga Sunbai! Kay Mhantay Sasubai?	Zee Studios; Sunflower Studios	₹10.23 crore	
6	Ghabadkund	Icon De Style Pvt. Ltd.	₹8.43 crore	
7	Jayanti 2	Meliorist Film Studio	₹6.24 crore	
8	Super Duperr	99 Productions; Siddhivinayak Productions	₹3.85 crore	
9	Bhootam Bhayyam	Kyra Kumar Creations	₹3.75 crore	
10	Aadi Anant *	Panorama Studios	₹2.71 crore	

== January–March ==
Opening		Title	Director	Cast	Studio (production house)	Ref.
J A N	1	Krantijyoti Vidyalay Marathi Madhyam	Hemant Dhome	Sachin Khedekar, Amey Wagh, Siddharth Chandekar, Kshitee Jog, Kadambari Kadam, Harish Dudhade, Pushkaraj Chirputkar, Prajakta Koli	Chalchitra Mandalee	
J A N	1	Magic	Ravindra Karmarkar	Jitendra Joshi, Jui Bhagwat, Siddheerupa Karmarkar	Tutri Ventures	
J A N	2	Rappata	Premsagar Suryawanshi	Vikas Koravi, Prachi Karoshi, Sanket Mali, Yashwant Jadhav, Vaibhav Gavade, Vivek Kesarkar, Shital Bhosale, Ketki Gawade	A.P. Communications	
J A N	16	Aga Aga Sunbai! Kay Mhantay Sasubai?	Kedar Shinde	Nirmiti Sawant, Prarthana Behere, Rajan Bhise, Nakul Ghanekar	Zee Studios, Sunflower Studios	
J A N	16	Sud Shakarambh	Shoaib Khatib	Manisha More, Ayush Ulghade, Om Panskar, Sunil Suryavanshi, Anil Rabade, Aishwarya Mallikarjun, Sonali Ghadge, Saloni Lokhande, Raj Sane, Maruti Kengar	Rajneel Film Production	
J A N	30	Gandhi Talks	Kishor Pandurang Belekar	Vijay Sethupathi, Arvind Swamy, Aditi Rao Hydari, Siddharth Jadhav	Zee Studios, Kyoorius, Moviemill, Jumping Tomato Studios	
F E B	6	Rubaab	Shekhar Bapu Rankhambe	Sambhaji Sasane, Sheetal Patil, Vishal Shirtode, Abhijeet Sakate, Simran Khedkar	Zankar Films, Zee Studios	
F E B	6	Ranapati Shivray: Swari Agra	Digpal Lanjekar	Abhijeet Shwetachandra, Mrinal Kulkarni, Puneet Issar, Ajay Purkar, Sameer Dharmadhikari, Digpal Lanjekar, Prasanna Ketkar, Rishi Saxena, Sachin Deshpande, Nikhil Raut, Yogesh Soman, Smita Shewale, Nupur Daithankar	Panorama Studios	
F E B	6	Case No. 73	Dr. Milind Mukteshwar Apte	Ashok Shinde, Rajasi Bhave, Shailesh Datar, Nandita Patkar, Piyush Apte	Lailack Motion Pictures, Dusk Studios	
F E B	6	Jabraat	Pragati Kolage	Ayush Sanjeev, Anushka Sarkate, Vanita Kharat	Tara Karamnuk	
F E B	6	Lagnacha Shot	Akshay Gore	Abhijeet Amkar, Priyadarshini Indalkar	Mahaparva Films, Jija Film Company	
F E B	6	After Operation London Cafe (Note: The film was produced in Marathi and Kannada languages.)	Sadagara Raghavendra	Kaveesh Shetty, Megha Shetty, Shivani Surve, Virat Madake	Indian Film Factory, Deepak Rane Films	
F E B	13	Man Aatle Manatale	Abhijeet Mujumdar	Manasi Naik, Suren Mahapatra, Upendra Limaye, Ruturaj Phadke, Sandeep Gaikwad, Kamlesh Sawant, Arun Nalawade, Yatin Karyekar, Siya Patil, Rajesh Aher, Vinit Bhonde	Surya Film World	
F E B	13	Punha Ekda Sade Made Teen	Ankush Chaudhari	Ashok Saraf, Bharat Jadhav, Makarand Anaspure, Siddharth Jadhav, Rinku Rajguru, Sanket Pathak	Usha Kakade Productions, EOD Media Official, Udaharnarth Nirmit, Ameya Vinod Khopkar Pictures	
F E B	27	Maya	Aditya Ingle	Mukta Barve, Siddharth Chandekar, Rohini Hattangadi, Girish Oak	Shalini Cinema, Nitin Vaidya Productions	
M A R	6	Tighee	Jeejivisha Kale	Bharati Achrekar, Neha Pendse, Sonalee Kulkarni	Coquelicot Pictures, Supri Advertising and Entertainment	
M A R	6	Bhidewada	Shivani Rajeshirke, Ajit Shirole	Prajakta Gaikwad, Madhav Abhyankar, Vaibhav Chavan, Rituraj Wankhede, Neha Sonawane, Samrat Shirole, Pradeep Kothmire, Anand Pimpalkar	Shivmudra Studios	
M A R	13	Dukan	Gajendra Ahire	Seema Biswas, Neha Joshi, Govind Namdev, Parth Bhalerao, Namrata Sambherao, Swapnil Rajshekhar	Shree Ganesh Marketing & Films	

== April–June ==
Opening		Title	Director	Cast	Studio (production house)	Ref.
A P R	3	Super Duperr	Sameer Asha Patil	Lalit Prabhakar, Vidhula Choughule, Nirmiti Sawant, Namrata Sambherao, Hrishikesh Joshi, Shashank Shende	99 Productions, Siddhivinayak Productions	
A P R	3	Sakhe Ga Saajani	Abhishek Javekar	Pooja Sawant, Prarthana Behere, Abhijeet Khandkekar	Redbulb Studios	
A P R	10	The Trap	Amol Khapre	Hardeek Joshi, Sujit Jadhav, Mohan Joshi, Sanjay Khapre, Shyam Mohite, Swati Limaye	Mast Punekar	
A P R	10	Toh Ti Ani Fuji	Mohit Takalkar	Lalit Prabhakar, Mrinmayee Godbole	Platoon One Films'	
A P R	17	Phula	Abhishek Javeer	Priyantika, Aarohi Gade, Manjusha Khetri, Santosh Shinde, Deva Gadekar, Ravikiran Javeer, Sunny Kadam, Chhaya Adat, Sharad Landge	Shivsharvil Movie, Bodhi Cinema	
A P R	17	Salbardi	Ramesh Sahebrao Choudhary	Pooja Sawant, Bharat Ganeshpure, Omkar Bhojane, Anshuman Vichare, Pravin Dalimbkar, Chittaranjan Giri, Madhav Abhyankar, Shashank Shende, Anik Nagarkar, Rohit Kokate	Nebula Films	
A P R	24	Bhagubai	Sanjay Amar	Nirmiti Sawant, Bhargavi Chirmule, Shashank Shende, Mangesh Desai, Vijay Patkar, Nagesh Bhonsle, Nikhil Chavan	Ultra Media & Entertainment	
M A Y	1	Raja Shivaji	Riteish Deshmukh	Riteish Deshmukh, Sanjay Dutt, Abhishek Bachchan, Mahesh Manjrekar, Sachin Khedekar, Bhagyashree, Fardeen Khan, Jitendra Joshi, Amole Gupte, Genelia Deshmukh	Mumbai Film Company, Jio Studios	
M A Y	15	Baapya	Sameer Tiwari	Girish Kulkarni, Rajshri Deshpande, Devika Daftardar, Shrikant Yadav, Aryan Menghji	Workingifilms	
M A Y	15	Picture Boyz	Nileshsingh Rajput	Pratik Lad, Hansraj Jagtap, Arbaz Shaikh, Ghanshyam Darwade	Trimurti Films	
M A Y	15	Mumbai Mission	Chandrakant Vispute	Ajay Sharma, Vijay Patkar, Anant Jog, Shanti Bavkar, Surekha Kudachi	Revikanta Films, Aakat Distribution	
M A Y	15	Ladki Bahin	Shital Shinde	Smita Tambe, Surekha Kudachi, Usha Nadkarni, Gautami Patil	Shubham Film Production, Shanidev Films	
M A Y	15	Triangle	Vickey Suryawanshi	Arjun Kare, Poonam Kapse, Vickey Suryawanshi, Alok Beske, Bhakti Sadhu	Vaishnavi Films	
M A Y	21	Deool Band 2	Pravin Tarde	Mohan Joshi, Snehal Tarde	Vatvruksha Entertainment	
J U N	5	Tumbadchi Manjula	Vividh Korgaonkar	Jitendra Joshi, Om Bhutkar, Makarand Anaspure, Sai Tamhankar, Usha Nadkarni	Zee Studios	
J U N	12	The Maharashtra Files	Sanjivkumar Rathod	Usha Nadkarni, Mangesh Desai, Veena Jamkar, Sayaji Shinde, Nagesh Bhonsle	Jai Jagdamba Productions	
J U N	19	Cup Bashi	Vaibhav Chinchalkar	Pooja Sawant, Nirmiti Sawant, Rishi Manohar	Sukalp Chitra, Big Brain Productions	
J U N	19	Ghabadkund	Pritam SK Patil	Devdatta Nage, Kushal Badrike, Shashank Shende, Prajakta Hanamghar, Sahil Annaldewar, Sandeep Pathak, Rocky Deshmukh, Smitaa Paygude Anjute, Vaishnavi Kalyankar, Pravin Dalimkar	Icon De Style Pvt. Ltd.	
J U N	19	Drushya Adrushya	Milind Lele	Pooja Sawant, Ashok Samarth, Suvrat Joshi, Hardeek Joshi, Akshay Gurav, Vidyadhar Joshi, Kea Ingle	RST Canvas Production	
J U N	25	Bewaras	Vijay Rane; Ria Kumar	Vikram Gokhale, Tejaswini Pandit, Rohini Hattangadi, Usha Naik, Nihar Gite, Rutuja Bagwe, Uday Tikekar, Shreejit Marathe, Aditya Deshmukh	Harini Productions	

== July–September ==
Opening		Title	Director	Cast	Studio (production house)	Ref.
J U L	3	Mardini	Ajay Mayekar	Prarthana Behere, Abhijeet Khandkekar, Jitendra Joshi, Rajesh Bhosale	Affluence Motion Pictures, ODI Group	
J U L	3	Out of Syllabus	Navin Deshboina	Ajinkya Raut, Advayee, Milind Shinde, Abhijeet Shwetchandra, Kamlesh Sawant	Adu-Tishu Production and music	
J U L	10	Tula Pahata	Mayura Pradhan	Satish Pulekar, Ela Bhate, Nachiket Lele, Mansi Patil, Nishigandha Wad, Anand Kale, Deepali Vichare	Brave Wheels Productions	
J U L	10	Frame	Vikram Patwardhan	Nagraj Manjule, Amey Wagh, Mugdha Godse, Akshaya Gurav	Aatpat, Zee Studios	
J U L	17	Bol Bol Rani	Sid Vinsurkar	Sai Tamhankar, Chinmay Mandlekar, Subodh Bhave, Sambhaji Sasane	New Zealand Motion Pictures LTD	
J U L	24	Swapnasundari	Akshay Shinde	Bhushan Pradhan, Sayli Patil	Redbell Media	
J U L	24	Bhootam Bhayyam	Ramchandra Gaonkar	Chhaya Kadam, Karan Sonawane, Neel Salekar, Saurabh Ghadge, Siddhant Sarfare, Shubham Jadhav, Pushkaraj Chirputkar, Manmeet Pem	Kyra Kumar Creations	
J U L	24	Ek Hota Malin	Dattatray Gaikar; Raju Rane	Prashant Mohite, Ashwini Kasar, Abhijit Shwetchandra, Siddhi Patne	Dream Dot Creation Production	
J U L	31	Mamachya Govyala Jauya	Viju Mane	Abhijeet Chavan, Kushal Badrike, Santosh Juvekar, Ankush Chaudhari	Vijumania Private Limited	
A U G	14	Sammarth	Yogesh Phulphagar	Bhushan Pradhan, Pushkaraj Chirputkar, Isha Keskar, Sharvari Jamenis, Prasad Khandekar	Thermaline Marketing Private Limited, A3 Events and Media Services	
S E P	4	Dwidha	Nilesh Naik	Mansi Kulkarni, Satish Pulekar	Spinning Wheel Productions	
S E P	11	Jayanti 2	Shailesh Narwade	Ruturaj Wankhede, Priyadarshini Indalkar, Payal Jadhav, Rohini Hattangadi, Devika Daftardar	Meliorist Film Studio	
S E P	11	Bhata	Bharatraj Yadav	Mohan Joshi, Arun Nalawade, Vijay Kadam, Anil Nagarkar, Laxman Devbhat, Prashant Mohite, Rupali Jadhav, Prema Kiran, Tanishka Jadhav	V. D. Entertainment, Morya Udyog Samuh	
S E P	11	Adkitta	Ashutosh Parandkar	Sai Tamhankar, Siddharth Chandekar, Sakhi Gokhale	Mangesh Pawar & Co., Jackpot Entertainmentss, Loka Loka Motion Pictures	
S E P	18	Manjar	Sushil Mahadev	Siddharth Menon, Onkar Bhojane, Tejas Raut, Bhagyashree Limaye	H3 Motion Pictures, Just Right Films	
S E P	18	Case No. 99	Ajay Purkar	Ajay Purkar, Mrunmayee Deshpande, Chinmay Mandlekar, Swapnali Patil	Chitrakathi Creations	
S E P	24	Bandkhor	Mahesh Manjrekar	Mrinal Kulkarni, Chhaya Kadam, Priyadarshini Indalkar, Titeeksha Tawde, Pooja Katurde, Nityashree Dnyanlaxmi	Vinsan Graphic Production	
S E P	25	Tujhya Aaila	Sujay Dahake	Rajshri Deshpande, Rohini Hattangadi, Sambhaji Bhagat	Panorama Studios	
S E P	25	Devghar On Rent	Swaroop Sawant	Garuda Ram, Shravan Raghvendra, Nikhil Chavan, Ankit Mohan, Bhau Kadam, Ashwini Chaware, Shashank Shende, Gautami Patil	Radhakrishna Productions	
S E P	25	Psycho Ranga	Devendra Chougule	Subodh Bhave, Milind Shinde, Pushkar Jog, Anand Kale, Smita Gondkar, Janhavi Killekar	Maharashtra Films	

== October–December ==
Opening		Title	Director	Cast	Studio (production house)	Ref.
O C T	2	Gaman	Manoj Naiksatam	Narayan Jadhav, Shraddha Khanolkar	Naiksatam Arts	
O C T	2	Aali Mothi Shahani	Anand Gokhale	Hruta Durgule, Sarang Sathaye	Fine Brew Productions, True Hope Film Works	
O C T	9	Paach Futacha Bachchan	Kaustubh Deshpande	Shruti Madhudeep, Gauri Nalawade, Shashank Shende, Chinmayee Sumit, Kishor Kadam, Pushkaraj Chirputkar	Orpheus Films	
O C T	9	Afratafri	Milind Kavde	Mohan Agashe, Sanjay Narvekar, Shashank Shende, Asavari Joshi, Prajakta Hanamghar, Kiran Mane, Onkar Bhojane, Neha Khan	Skyline Cinematic, YEN Movie Studios	
O C T	9	Sahal	Mukund Khuperkar	Devika Daftardar, Siddhesh Mukund, Kalyani Adsul	K Swamini Film Production	
O C T	9	Dhappa	Raviraj Wavhole	Sagar Bhandare, Pratiksha Atram	Vrindavan Entertainment & Films	
O C T	16	Sohla	Saaikat Bagbaan	Pravin Dalimbkar, Vaishnavi Ghodke, Devdatta Ghone	Rose Audio Visuals, Carryon Fiilms	
O C T	23	Kapuskonda	Sachin Mohite	Sachin Pilgaonkar, Madhurani Gokhale, Akshata Padgaonkar, Janhavi Tambat, Bhushan Patil	Jaswand Entertainment	
O C T	23	Magazine	Shubham Shevade	Raghav Vartak, Dr. Nilesh Mane, Sudarshan Deshmukh, Vedika Kulkarni, Atul Parchure, Kishor Kadam, Shivaji Satam	Roots Back Home, Home Cook Films	
O C T	23	Dashami	Yogesh Bhosale	Makarand Anaspure, Gauri Ingawale, Ravi Prakash	KNK Box	
O C T	23	Lagna Aani Barach Kahi	Vedanti Dani	Pooja Sawant, Abhijeet Khandkekar	Avyaan Arts, Mahalasa Entertainment	
O C T	23	Mrutyuchakra	Vilas Waghmode	Shashank Shende, Akshaya Gurav, Pushkaraj Chirputkar, Aastad Kale, Krutika Tulaskar	Adhyaansh Motion Pictures	
O C T	23	Sarpanch: The Power Man	Prashant Jadhavar	Mahadev Jadhavar, Kashish Patil, Balasaheb Kate	Aniket Film Productions	
O C T	23	Dharau	Manish Suresh Shinde	Shaurya Kalidas Wanjale, Shlok Atul Mehkarkar	Buldhana Urban Media House, Hindchitra Films	
O C T	30	Sunday 1996	Rajendra Chavan	Ganesh Yadav, Pankaj Vishnu, Onkar Raut	V. R. K. Films	
N O V	12	Aadi Anant	Mahesh Limaye	Ashok Saraf, Sankarshan Karhade, Sakhi Gokhale	Panorama Studios	
N O V	13	Janak	Abhishek Kanwar	Sayali Sanjeev, Avinash Narkar, Suresh Vishwakarma	Rose Trailblazer Films	
N O V	19	Chikeezing	Rajendra Bagate	Krishnaraj Waingade, Prabhakar More, Sejal Kore	Theme Team Studios, KeyFrame Productions	
N O V	20	Bandhu	Nitin Supekar	Upendra Limaye, Jitendra Joshi	JSD Studios & Tryflix Studios	
N O V	20	Maitreyaa	Kranti Redkar	Samar Khalatkar, Sky, Aayushi Bhave, Ruchi Jail	Samar Times Production	
N O V	20	Patri Sarkar 1942	Manish Ansurkar	Anil Rabade, Siddharth Badi, Shubham Gawai, Rashmi Salvi	Bhagirathi Motion Pictures	
N O V	20	Jijai	Trushant Ingle	Rinku Rajguru, Kishore Kadam	Zee Studios, Coconut Films	
N O V	27	Gana Dhaav Re	Kedar Shinde	Pranali Ghogare, Bharat Jadhav, Bhargavi Chirmule, Sulabha Arya	Be-live Productions, Kalash Entertainment Private Limited	
N O V	27	Fauji	Ghanshyam Yede	Saurabh Gokhale, Arun Nalawade, Prajakta Gaikwad	Eklavya Pratishthan	
N O V	27	Miranda Warning	Sachin Dhotre	Adinath Kothare, Janhavi Killekar	Satnam Films Studio, Open Gate Movies	
D E C	11	Columbus	Ravindra Shivaji	Ankur Vadhave, Rohit Mane, Kiran Mane	S. S. R. Films	

== Upcoming releases ==
Title	Director	Production company	Ref.
Natmastak	Mahesh Raosaheb Kale	R. S. Golden Group	
Papyachya Pinkichi Lovestory	Gajendra Ahire	Akshar Films Private Limited	
Sahwas	Shivaji Doltade	Sonai Film Creation	
Kalawati	Sanjay Jadhav	MergeXR Studio, AVK Entertainment, Fifth Horizon	
Mogalmardini Chhatrapati Tararani	Rahul Jadhav	Planet Marathi, Mantra Vision	
Veer Murarbaji	Ajay - Anirudh	Almondss Creationss	

== See also ==
- List of Marathi films of 2025
