= Chalchitra Mandalee =

Indian film production company

- Type: Private
- Industry: Entertainment
- Founded: 2021; 5 years ago
- Founder: Kshitee Jog; Hemant Dhome
- Headquarters: Mumbai, India
- Products: Films

Chalchitra Mandalee (also styled as Chalchitra Company) is an Indian film production company based in Mumbai, Maharashtra, founded by actress-producer Kshitee Jog and her husband, filmmaker Hemant Dhome. The banner operates primarily in Marathi-language cinema and is known for producing family dramas and ensemble comedies that centre on themes of relationships, cultural identity, and women's empowerment. Since its first production in 2021, Chalchitra Mandalee has emerged as one of the notable independent production houses in contemporary Marathi cinema.

== Background ==
The name Chalchitra Mandalee is a Marathi phrase roughly meaning "film circle" or "cinema ensemble," reflecting the founders' commitment to collaborative, ensemble-driven storytelling rooted in Marathi culture.

== History ==
Chalchitra Mandalee was founded by actor-producer Kshitee Jog and actor-director-writer Hemant Dhome as a platform for their collaborative work.

In early 2021, the company announced its maiden production, Jhimma, though its release date remained uncertain due to government-imposed 50 percent occupancy restrictions in cinema halls following the COVID-19 pandemic in India. The film had completed principal photography in mid-2019 in London and was among the early Marathi films to be extensively shot there. Originally scheduled for release in April 2021, Jhimma was postponed because of the second wave of the pandemic and eventually premiered on 19 November 2021. Despite the uncertainty surrounding theatrical exhibition, the film emerged as a major commercial success, running for over 100 days in cinemas and grossing ₹15.7 crore worldwide against a reported budget of around ₹3 crore.It became one of the highest-grossing Marathi films of the year and received widespread critical acclaim. At the 6th Filmfare Awards Marathi, the film received 11 nominations and won four awards, including Best Film. In 2025, it was remade in Gujarati as Umbarro.

Following the success of Jhimma, the company’s second production, Sunny, was released in 2022. Starring Lalit Prabhakar in the title role alongside Chinmay Mandlekar and Jog, the film drew from Dhome’s own experiences of studying abroad, its story follows a privileged young man sent to the United Kingdom for higher studies, where he undergoes a personal transformation. Co-produced with Planet Marathi, Creative Vibe Productions, and Crazy Few Films, Sunny was released on 18 November 2022. Although it received positive reviews, its theatrical performance was affected by competition from Drishyam 2 and widespread show cancellations across Maharashtra.

On 24 January 2023, Chalchitra Mandalee announced its third production, Jhimma 2, a sequel to Jhimma and the company’s first collaboration with filmmaker Aanand L. Rai’s Colour Yellow Productions, Jio Studios also joined as co-producer. The film reunited much of the original cast while introducing new characters portrayed by Rinku Rajguru and Shivani Surve. Released in November 2023 amid competition from major Hindi releases such as Animal, Sam Bahadur, and Salaar: Part 1 – Ceasefire, Jhimma 2 emerged as another commercial success, grossing over ₹14 crore worldwide and becoming the third-highest-grossing Marathi film of the year.

Both Sunny and Jhimma 2 received nominations for Best Film at the 60th and 61st Maharashtra State Film Awards, respectively.

The company’s next production, Fussclass Dabhade,was notable for being the first project written solely by Hemant Dhome, without the creative involvement of Irawati Karnik. Announced in September 2024, the film brought together Chalchitra Mandalee, Colour Yellow Productions, and T-Series as co-producers. After being postponed from its original Diwali 2024 release window, it was released on 24 January 2025. The film received mixed-to-positive reviews, with praise for its performances and emotional warmth, although some critics noted its lengthy runtime. Commercially, however, it underperformed at the box office.

On Maharashtra Day, 1 May 2025, Chalchitra Mandalee and Colour Yellow Productions announced their third consecutive collaboration with Krantijyoti Vidyalay Marathi Madhyam. Written and directed by Dhome, the film explores the decline of Marathi-medium schools in Maharashtra, a subject of cultural and political significance in the state. It marked the Marathi film debut of digital creator Prajakta Koli alongside an ensemble cast. Principal photography took place in Alibaug and was completed by September 2025. Upon release, the film received widespread critical acclaim and strong audience response, grossing ₹32 crore worldwide, with an India net collection of ₹27.35 crore. It became the banner’s highest-grossing production, one of the most profitable Marathi films of 2026, and among the third highest-grossing Marathi film of all time.

Later in 2025, Jog and Dhome announced Jhimma 3 as well as a sequel to Krantijyoti Vidyalay Marathi Madhyam.

== Films produced ==
Key
†	Denotes films that have not yet been released

Title	Release Date	Director	Writer	Cast	Notes	Ref.
Jhimma	19 November 2021	Hemant Dhome	Irawati Karnik, Hemant Dhome	Suhas Joshi, Nirmiti Sawant, Sonalee Kulkarni, Siddharth Chandekar, Kshitee Jog, Suchitra Bandekar, Mrinmayee Godbole, Sayali Sanjeev	co-produced by AVK Entertainment and Crazy Few Films	
Sunny	18 November 2022	Hemant Dhome	Irawati Karnik, Hemant Dhome	Lalit Prabhakar, Kshitee Jog, Chinmay Mandlekar	co-produced by Crazy Few Films, Planet Marathi and Creative Vibe	
Jhimma 2	24 November 2023	Hemant Dhome	Irawati Karnik, Hemant Dhome	Suhas Joshi, Nirmiti Sawant, Siddharth Chandekar, Kshitee Jog, Suchitra Bandekar, Sayali Sanjeev, Shivani Surve, Rinku Rajguru	co-produced by Jio Studios and Colour Yellow Productions	
Fussclass Dabhade	24 January 2025	Hemant Dhome	Hemant Dhome	Amey Wagh, Siddharth Chandekar, Kshitee Jog	co-produced by Colour Yellow Productions and T-Series	
Krantijyoti Vidyalay Marathi Madhyam	1 January 2026	Hemant Dhome	Hemant Dhome	Sachin Khedekar, Amey Wagh, Siddharth Chandekar, Prajakta Koli, Kshitee Jog, Harish Dudhade, Kadambari Kadam, Pushkaraj Chirputkar	co-produced by Crazy Few Films	
