= Sunny (2022 film) =

- Theatrical release poster
- Directed by: Hemant Dhome
- Screenplay by: Irawati Karnik
- Story by: Hemant Dhome
- Produced by: Akshay Bardapurkar; Kshitee Jog; Viraj Gawas; Urfi Kazmi; Santosh Kher; Tejaswini Pandit
- Starring: Lalit Prabhakar; Kshitee Jog; Chinmay Mandlekar
- Cinematography: Satyajeet Shobha Shriram
- Edited by: Faisal Mahadik; Imran Mahadik
- Music by: Souumil-Siddharth
- Production companies: Crazy Few Films; Planet Marathi; Creative Vibe; Chalchitra Company
- Distributed by: Sunshine Studios
- Release date: 18 November 2022
- Country: India
- Language: Marathi

Sunny is a 2022 Marathi-language drama film directed by Hemant Dhome and produced by Akshay Bardapurkar, Kshitee Jog, Viraj Gawas and Urfi Kazmi. Screenplay and dialogues written by Irawati Karnik. The film stars Lalit Prabhakar in the title role, Kshitee Jog, Chinmay Mandlekar, Abhishek Deshmukh.

== Cast ==
- Lalit Prabhakar as Sunny
- Kshitee Jog
- Chinmay Mandlekar as Vishwajeet
- Abhishek Deshmukh
- Amey Barve
- Parth Ketkar
- Nandini Joag
- Ameeta Kulkarni
- Paulo Andre Argao as Dikembe
- Megan Liberty Edmunds
- Michelle Callcut as Lydia
- Andrew Forbs
- Jack McGinn as Roy
- Pedro Bosnich as Oliver

== Release ==
Sunny was theatrically released on 18 November 2022 all over Maharashtra.

== Reception ==
=== Critical reception ===
Mihir Bhanage of The Times of India gave 3.5 out of 5 and wrote "The film makes us realize how we take for granted the things we have in abundance, including love and care. It is a film about a hero who finds himself in the stories of the people around him. You will leave the theater with a sweet aftertaste."
