= Lalit Prabhakar =

Indian actor working in Marathi films

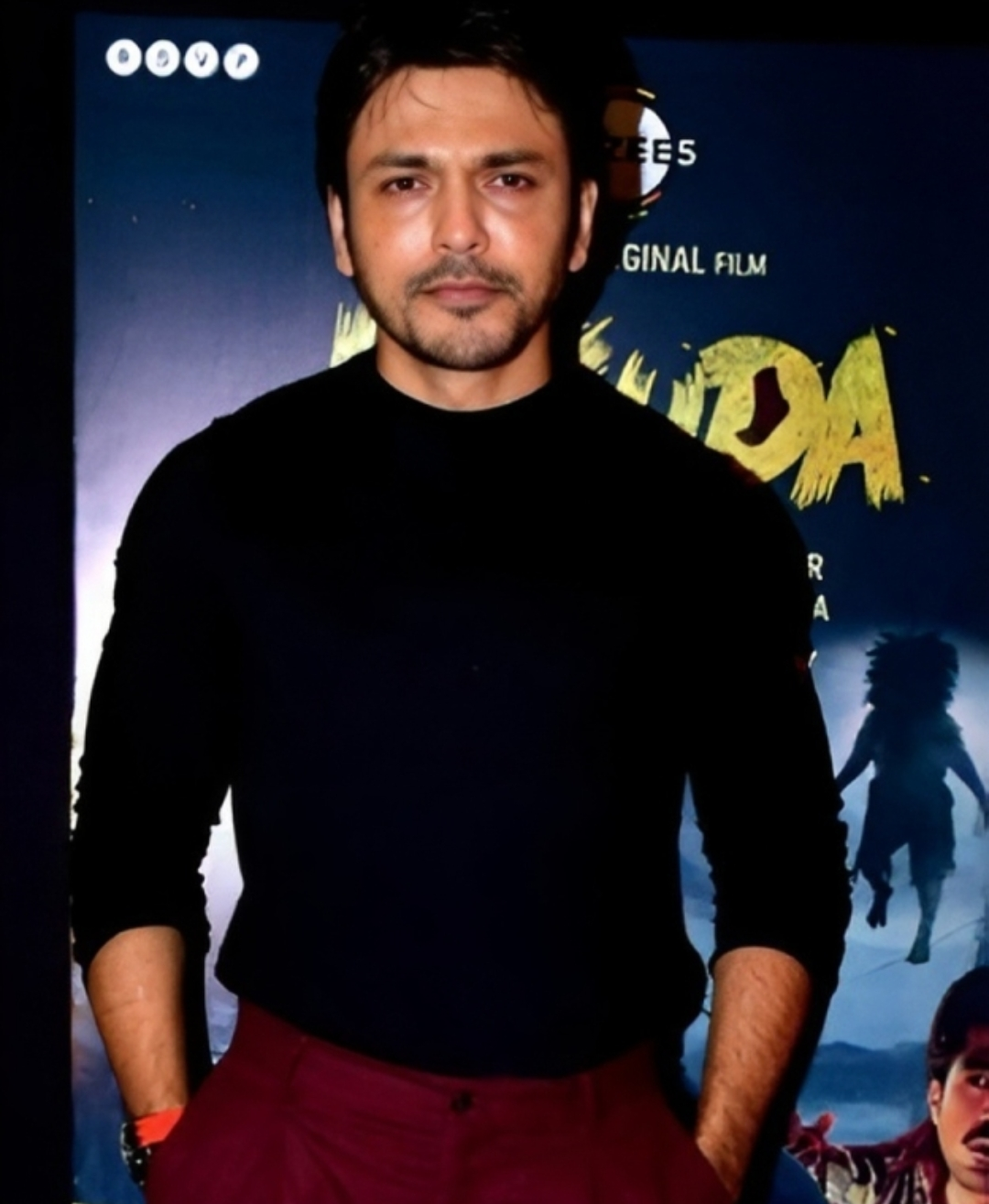
- Prabhakar in 2024
- Born: Lalit Bhadane; 12 September 1987 (age 39); Kalyan, Maharashtra, India
- Occupations: Actor; director
- Years active: 2008 – present

Lalit Prabhakar Bhadane (12 September 1987), known professionally as Lalit Prabhakar is an Indian actor and director known for his work primarily in Marathi film and television, alongside Hindi film and streaming projects. He is regarded as one of the leading contemporary actors of Marathi cinema and has received numerous accolades, including a Maharashtra State Film Award, a Filmfare Award Marathi, and two Zee Marathi Award.

He began his career in Marathi theatre before making his television debut around 2008, and rose to prominence with the daily soap Julun Yeti Reshimgathi. He made his film debut as a lead in Paresh Mokashi's Chi Va Chi Sau Ka (2017), for which he won the State Film Award. He went on to establish himself as a leading man through films such as Hampi (2017) and Smile Please (2019).

Prabhakar received critical acclaim for his portrayal of Gopalrao Joshi in the biographical drama Anandi Gopal (2019), a performance that won him the Filmfare Award and earned him a nomination for the Maharashtra State Film Award for Best Actor. He subsequently expanded into the digital streaming space with series such as Shantit Kranti (2021) and Pet Puraan (2022), and took on dual roles in the Marathi horror-comedy Zombivli (2022).

Alongside continued work in Marathi film, including Medium Spicy (2022), Sunny (2022), and Super Duperr (2026), Prabhakar has appeared in Hindi productions such as Ground Zero (2025) and One Two Cha Cha Chaa (2026). He has also featured multiple times on The Times of India's list of the Most Desirable Men of Maharashtra.

== Early life ==
Prabhakar was born as Lalit Prabhakar Bhadane on 12 September 1987 in Kalyan, Maharashtra, into a family originally from Samode, a village in Dhule district. His father worked as a professor at an Industrial Training Institute, while his mother was a schoolteacher. Owing to his father's transfers, Prabhakar spent his childhood in several towns across Maharashtra. He began his schooling at Yashwant Vidyalaya in Ulhasnagar, where his family lived in Camp No. 4, and studied there until the second standard. After the family moved to Badlapur, he attended Katrap Vidyalaya up to the fifth standard and later studied from the sixth to the eighth standard at Jawahar Navodaya Vidyalaya in Dahanu, before returning to Badlapur to complete the ninth and tenth standards at Bal Vikas Mandir School. He pursued his higher secondary education at Vani Junior College in Mulund and subsequently graduated with a Bachelor of Science degree in Computer Science from Birla College of Arts, Commerce and Science in Kalyan.

Prabhakar developed an early interest in the performing arts and, as a teenager, joined the Kalyan-based experimental theatre group Mitee-Chaar. Working under theatre director Ravindra Lakhe, he performed in a several one-act and full-length Marathi plays, his involvement with the group also provided him with experience in stagecraft, improvisation, and production work. From 2010 to 2012, Prabhakar was awarded the Young Artiste Scholarship by the Ministry of Culture, an honour extended to only around thirty artists across the country each year.

== Career ==
=== Television and theatre beginnings (2008–2016) ===
Prabhakar made his television debut around 2008, taking on supporting roles such as that of Mohit in Zee Marathi's serial Kunku. During his fellowship years, he also appeared in Avinash Narkar's experimental play Takshakyag.

His breakthrough came with the Zee Marathi daily soap Julun Yeti Reshimgathi (2013–2015), in which he played the male lead, Aditya Desai, opposite Prajakta Mali. The on-screen pairing of the two lead actors proved highly popular with audiences, and the serial became one of the top-rated Marathi television shows of its time. The performance earned him the Best Actor award at the Zee Marathi Awards in 2014. In the same period, he drew attention for his portrayal of the antagonist Lakhnya in the ETV Marathi serial Gandh Phulancha Gela Sangun (2015). He also directed and starred in Adrushya Nagaritlya Katha (2015), a Marathi-language adaptation of Italo Calvino's novel Invisible Cities. Prabhakar went on to play Kabir, a filmmaker and love interest of the female lead, in the serial Dil Dosti Duniyadari (2015), and co-hosted the chat show Talkies Light House (2016) alongside Neha Mahajan on Zee Talkies. During this time, he also directed the experimental play Aswastha Samudravar Bail Melay (2016) and appeared in the stage productions Dhol Tashe (2016) and Pati Gele Ga Kathewadi (2017).

=== Film debut and breakthrough (2017–2019) ===
He made his film debut as a lead actor in Paresh Mokashi's romantic comedy-drama Chi Va Chi Sau Ka (2017), playing an environmentalist. The film won him the Zee Talkies Comedy Award for Best Actor and the Maharashtra State Film Award for Best Debut Actor, along with several other nominations, and critics singled out the "realistic" quality of his performance. His next film, Tujha Tu Majha Mi, followed a similar storyline, in which he played a traveler reluctant to marry. His third release that year, the romantic drama Hampi, co-starred Sonalee Kulkarni and Prajakta Mali; reviewing the film for The Times of India, Mihir Bhanage observed that "Lalit is so much at ease in the charming Kabir’s shoes that his acting feels natural and not forced."

His most notable role came in 2019 with the biographical drama Anandi Gopal, directed by Sameer Vidwans, in which he played Gopalrao Joshi, the supportive husband of Anandibai Joshi, one of India's first women physicians. The film was widely praised; writing for Scroll.in, Nandini Ramnath noted that "Prabhakar deftly conveys Gopal's unlikely heroism," with the character's tough-love approach read as a reaction to the social structures that kept women from education and employment. The film was among the highest-grossing Marathi releases of the year and went on to win the National Film Award for Best Film on Other Social Issues. Prabhakar's performance earned him the Best Actor Critics' award at the 5th Filmfare Awards Marathi, together with a nomination in the Best Actor category and the Maharashtra State Film Award for Best Actor. That year, he also appeared in Vikram Phadnis' Smile Please, opposite Mukta Barve.

=== Streaming and continued success (2020–2026) ===
In 2020, Prabhakar made his debut in the digital space with the Hindi ensemble murder-mystery series The Raikar Case, playing Eklavya, one of several look-alike suspects. In its review, SpotboyE wrote that "Prabhakar also deserve a special mention for shining out in this ensemble star cast." He then appeared in the series Shantit Kranti, playing a man on the verge of fatherhood as his youth comes to an end; the series was well received and was renewed for a second season in 2023.

In 2022, he took on dual roles in Aditya Sarpotdar's horror-comedy Zombivli, one of the first zombie-themed films in Marathi cinema, alongside Amey Wagh and Vaidehi Parshurami; the film and its lead performances were both well received. He then played an introverted chef in Medium Spicy, opposite Parna Pethe and Sai Tamhankar. Reviewing the film, Pune Mirror wrote that "Prabhakar does justice to the role in every way," portraying an indecisive, overthinking character who largely reacts to the events unfolding around him rather than driving them. His final release of the year was Hemant Dhome's Sunny, in which he played the title role, a troublemaking younger brother to a character played by Chinmay Mandlekar. Writing in The Times of India, Mihir Bhanage observed that "Sunny belongs to its leading man Lalit Prabhakar, who slips into the character so well that character’s screen presence dominates that of the star." Although the film did not match the commercial success of other Chalchitra Mandalee productions, it earned Prabhakar nominations for Best Actor at the Filmfare Awards Marathi and the Maharashtra State Film Awards. Beyond these films, he also appeared in the slice-of-life web series Pet Puraan, about pet ownership, on Sony LIV, and made a cameo in the YouTube series B.E. Rojgaar; both alongside Sai Tamhankar.

Prabhakar's only release of 2023 was the action drama Tarri, which underperformed both critically and commercially. He reunited with director Prakash Kunte and actor Sai Tamhankar for the romantic drama Colorphool, about a man troubled by his past who meets a filmmaker in a village and whose relationship with her deepens after her accident. Originally slated for a 2021 release, the film was delayed and finally released in 2024, where it went largely unnoticed.

In 2025, his performance as an assistant commandant and colleague to Narendra Nath Dhar Dubey (played by Emraan Hashmi) in the Hindi action film Ground Zero was well received. That year also brought two Marathi film releases: the romantic drama Aarpar, opposite Hruta Durgule, about two lovers whose relationship is tested by an unexpected obstacle. The film drew a mixed critical response, though the lead pair's on-screen chemistry was widely praised, and the two went on to win the Zee Chitra Gaurav Puraskar for Best Jodi. Writing in Maharashtra Times, Kalpeshraj Kubal observed that "Lalit shows the inner turmoil of the character so meticulously that the restlessness in his eyes reaches the hearts of the audience." He then took the lead in Satish Rajwade's Premachi Goshta 2, a sequel to Rajwade's acclaimed film of the same name, playing a disillusioned man alongside Ridhima Pandit, Rucha Vaidya, Swapnil Joshi and Bhalchandra Kadam. Sakal critic Santosh Bhingarde wrote that "He has depicted all the aspects of Arjun's mind, emotions, love, friendship and anger on the screen perfectly." Neither film performed well commercially.

The following year, he starred in the Hindi ensemble comedy One Two Cha Cha Chaa, which critics described as "a riot." His next release, the Marathi ensemble comedy-drama Super Duperr, was well received by critics and audiences alike, going on to earn a worldwide gross of ₹3.85 crore. He was then paired again with Mrinmayee Godbole in the romantic drama Toh Ti Ani Fuji, directed by Mohit Takalkar and released directly on Sony LIV. Rahul Desai of The Hollywood Reporter wrote, "Prabhakar does well to let both versions of one man bleed into each other, but without letting our impression of one influence the other." The role earned him a Special Mention award at the Pune International Film Festival.

Prabhakar later portrayed the role of Pakistani militant Ajmal Kasab, the lone surviving gunman in the 2008 Mumbai attacks captured by police in Prahaar: The Untold Story of Ujjwal Nikam opposite Rajkummar Rao. He stated in an interview that the role was very challenging, and Prahaar received positive reviews upon release, with both Prabhakar and Rao receiving critical acclaim for their portrayal.

== Media image ==
Prabhakar was ranked sixth on The Times of India's list of the Top 20 Most Desirable Men of Maharashtra in 2017, seventh in 2018, and twelfth in 2020.

== Personal life ==
Prabhakar has largely kept his personal life away from media attention and, as of 2026, remains unmarried. During the run of Julun Yeti Reshimgathi, his on-screen pairing with co-star Prajakta Mali led to media speculation about an off-screen romance; both actors denied the rumours, describing their relationship as professional. In an interview, Prabhakar stated that he preferred to stay away from love, marriage, and relationships, and has continued to avoid publicly discussing his romantic life in subsequent interviews.

== Filmography ==
=== Films ===
Year	Title	Role	Notes	Ref.
2017	Chi Va Chi Sau Ka	Satyaprakash (Satya)	Debut Film	
2017	TTMM – Tujha Tu Majha Mi	Jay		
2017	Hampi	Kabir		
2017	Khidkee	Ashween	Short film	
2019	Anandi Gopal	Gopalrao Joshi		
2019	Smile Please	Viraj		
2020	Dots	Shakti	English film	
2022	Zombivli	Vishwas / Jaggu		
2022	Medium Spicy	Nissim Tipnis		
2022	Sunny	Indraneel (Sunny)		
2023	Tarri	Sangram (Tarri)		
2024	Colorphool	Karan		
2024	Nach Ga Ghuma	Himself	Cameo appearance	
2024	Dil Abhi Bhara Nahi...	Rohan	Short film	
2025	Ground Zero	Praveen	Hindi film	
2025	Aarpar	Amar Randive		
2025	Premachi Goshta 2	Arjun Mapuskar		
2026	One Two Cha Cha Chaa	Sanjeev Jaiswal	Hindi film	
2026	Super Duperr	Rohit		
2026	Toh Ti Ani Fuji	Toh		
2026	Prahaar: The Untold Story of Ujjwal Nikam	Ajmal Kasab	Hindi film	
2026	Dhasal	Namdeo Dhasal		

=== Television ===
Year	Title	Role	Channel	Ref.
2008	Jeevlaga	Vallabh Desai	Star Pravah	
2011	Aabhas Ha	Rohan	Zee Marathi	
2011	Kunku	Mohit	Zee Marathi	
2013-2015	Julun Yeti Reshimgathi	Aditya Desai	Zee Marathi	
2015	Gandh Phulancha Gela Sangun	Lakhnya	ETV Marathi	
2015	Dil Dosti Duniyadari	Kabir	Zee Marathi	
2016	Talkies Light House	Host	Zee Talkies	
2017	Prem He		Zee Marathi	
2017	Naktichya Lagnala Yaycha Ha	Satyaprakash Solarputra	Zee Marathi	

=== Plays ===
Year	Play	Ref.
2014	Takshakyag	
2015	Adrushya Nagaritlya Katha	
2016	Aswastha Samudravar Bail Melay	
2016	Dhol Tashe	
2017	Pati Gele Ga Kathewadi	
2018	Backstage Wala Koni	
2018	Durustya ani Dekhbhal	

=== Web series ===
Year	Title	Role	Ref.
2020	The Raikar Case	Eklavya Rane	
2022	Pet Puraan	Atul Kokne	
2022	B.E. Rojgaar		
2021	Shantit Kranti	Prasanna (Pashya)	

== Awards and nominations ==
Year	Award	Category	Work	Result	Ref.
2014	Zee Marathi Utsav Natyancha Awards	Best Actor	Julun Yeti Reshimgathi	Won	
2014	Zee Marathi Utsav Natyancha Awards	Best Siblings	Julun Yeti Reshimgathi	Won	
2017	Maharashtra State Film Awards	Best Debut Actor	Chi Va Chi Sau Ka	Won	
2018	Zee Chitra Gaurav Puraskar	Best Actor	Chi Va Chi Sau Ka	Nominated	
2018	Zee Talkies Comedy Awards	Best Actor	Chi Va Chi Sau Ka	Won	
2018	Maharashtracha Favourite Kon?	Favourite Actor	Chi Va Chi Sau Ka	Nominated	
2018	Maharashtracha Favourite Kon?	Favourite Male Debut	Chi Va Chi Sau Ka	Nominated	
2019	Maharashtracha Favourite Kon?	Style Icon of the Year	—N/a	Nominated	
2019	Maharashtra State Film Awards	Best Actor	Anandi Gopal	Nominated	
2020	Pune International Film Festival	Best Actor	Anandi Gopal	Won	
2020	Filmfare Awards Marathi	Best Actor	Anandi Gopal	Nominated	
2020	Filmfare Awards Marathi	Best Actor Critics	Anandi Gopal	Won	
2020	Zee Chitra Gaurav Puraskar	Best Actor	Anandi Gopal	Won	
2020	Zee Chitra Gaurav Puraskar	Most Natural Performance Special Award	Smile Please	Won	
2020	Maharashtracha Favourite Kon?	Favourite Actor	Anandi Gopal	Won	
2021	Maharashtracha Favourite Kon?	Favourite Actor	Anandi Gopal	Nominated	
2022	Filmfare Awards Marathi	Best Actor	Sunny	Nominated	
2022	Maharashtra State Film Awards	Best Actor	Sunny	Nominated	
2022	Fakt Marathi Cine Sanman	Best Actor in a Supporting Role	Zombivli	Nominated	
2023	Maharashtracha Favourite Kon?	Favourite Actor	Zombivli	Nominated	
2023	Maharashtracha Favourite Kon?	Style Icon of the Year	—N/a	Nominated	
2024	Maharashtracha Favourite Kon?	Style Icon of the Year	—N/a	Nominated	
2026	Zee Chitra Gaurav Puraskar	Best Actor	Aarpar	Nominated	
2026	Zee Chitra Gaurav Puraskar	Best Jodi	Aarpar	Won	
2026	Pune International Film Festival	Jury Special Mention Award	Toh Ti Ani Fuji	Won	
2026	Filmfare Awards Marathi	Best Actor	Aarpar	Nominated	
