= Jhimma =

2021 Marathi film by Hemant Dhome

- Theatrical release poster
- Directed by: Hemant Dhome
- Written by: Irawati Karnik
- Story by: Hemant Dhome
- Produced by: Kshitee Jog; Ajinkya Dhamal; Viraj Gawas; Urfi Kazmi; Sunny Shah
- Starring: Suhas Joshi; Nirmiti Sawant; Sonalee Kulkarni; Siddharth Chandekar; Kshitee Jog
- Cinematography: Sanjay K. Memane
- Edited by: Faisal Mahadik; Imraan Mahadik
- Music by: Aditya Bedekar
- Production companies: Chalchitra Company; Crazy Few Films
- Release date: 19 November 2021
- Country: India
- Language: Marathi
- Box office: est. ₹15.7 crore

Jhimma is a 2021 Indian Marathi-language drama film directed by Hemant Dhome for Chalchitra Company. The film, written by Irawati Karnik and based on a story by Dhome, has an ensemble cast of Suhas Joshi, Nirmiti Sawant, Sonalee Kulkarni, Siddharth Chandekar, Kshitee Jog, Suchitra Bandekar, Mrinmayee Godbole, and Sayali Sanjeev. The story of the film revolves around a group of seven women travelling to London and discovering themselves. It was theatrically released on 19 November 2021, and grossed ₹15.7 crore (US$1.7 million) at the box office, becoming the second highest grossing Marathi film of 2021.

== Synopsis ==
Seven women from different age groups and different socio-cultural backgrounds come together on a vacation with a tour company to London. During the course of this trip these women unfold their journey. This trip turns into an opportunity to mend fences, heal wounds, fall in love with themselves, combat their worst fears and celebrate life.

== Cast ==
- Siddharth Chandekar as Kabir Kulkarni
- Sonalee Kulkarni as Maithili Deshpande
- Suchitra Bandekar as Vaishali Deshpande
- Nirmiti Sawant as Nirmala Konde-Patil
- Mrinmayee Godbole as Rama Lele-Shah
- Kshitee Jog as Meeta Jahagirdar
- Suhas Joshi as Indumati Karnik
- Sayali Sanjeev as Krutika Joshi
- Hemant Dhome as Nikhil
- Anant Jog as Saheb
- Tyler Baylis as Steve
- Mugdha Karnik as Anjali
- Namrata Anap as Namrata
- Priyanka Mayekar as Priyanka
- Sagar Nimbalkar as Dhiraj
- Chatrali Gupte as Meghana
- Maithili Patwardhan as Chingu
- Seema Chandekar as Kabir's mother
- Akshata Apte as Kabir's sister
- Sugandha Dalvi as Kabir's grandmother
- Amruta Todarmal as Rama's househelp
- Tabrez Patel as Indumati's son
- Michael Barclay
- George Nicol
- Simon Gibbons
- Florian Ghebac
- Maria Luz Tremsal
- Charlotte Dunnico

== Production ==
Principal photography of the film began on 9 July 2019. The London schedule of filming was wrapped in the end of July 2019. The dubbing of the film started on 24 June 2020. The release of the film was held up due to COVID-19 pandemic. In November 2020, the director Hemant Dhome, announced that the film will be released in theatres only.

== Release ==
The film was scheduled to be theatrically released on 23 April 2021, but due to surge in COVID-19 pandemic the release was postponed. It was then released theatrically on 19 November 2021.

== Reception ==
Mihir Bhanage of Times of India rated the film with 4 stars out of 5 and praised the performance of ensemble, writing, "Each one delivers beautiful performances, but it is Suhas Joshi and Nirmitee Sawant who steal the show. You have one life and you should live it to the fullest. This is the point Jhimma drives home beautifully, making it a must-watch for everyone, especially amid the pandemic." The Free Press Journal, Bobby Sing rated the film with three and a half stars and praised the performances of ensemble cast and music and wrote, "watch it as a must and have a great evening with this entertaining family film in the present testing times."

=== Box Office ===
The film was collected ₹2.98 crore in first week and ₹4.71 crore in ten days. In the second week film stand at ₹5.83 crore. As of 16 December 2021 the film has grossed ₹10.48 crore. Jhimma completed 50 days in theatres with many records, grossed over ₹14.07 crore and earned ₹15.7 crore in its final theatrical run.

== Soundtrack ==
Jhimma

Soundtrack album by Amitraj
- Released: 3 November 2021
- Recorded: 2021
- Genre: Feature film soundtrack
- Length: 10:21
- Language: Marathi
- Label: Zee Music Company

Official audio
- Jhimma - Full Album on YouTube

The film's music was composed by Amitraj while lyrics written by Kshitij Patwardhan.

Track listing
No.	Title	Singer(s)	Length
1.	"Jhimma Title Song"	Vaishali Samant, Mugdha Karhade, Aarti Kelkar, Suhas Joshi	2:50
2.	"Maze Gaon"	Apeksha Dandekar	3:39
3.	"Alvida"	Harshwardhan Wavare	3:52
Total length:			10:21

== Accolades ==
Awards	Year	Category	Recipient	Result	Ref
Filmfare Marathi Awards	2021	Best Film	Jhimma	Won	
Filmfare Marathi Awards	2021	Best Director	Hemant Dhome	Nominated	
Filmfare Marathi Awards	2021	Best Supporting Actress	Nirmiti Sawant	Nominated	
Filmfare Marathi Awards	2021	Best Supporting Actress	Suhas Joshi	Nominated	
Filmfare Marathi Awards	2021	Best Playback Singer – Female	Apeksha Dandekar - "Maze Gaon"	Won	
Filmfare Marathi Awards	2021	Best Music Director	Amitraj	Won	
Filmfare Marathi Awards	2021	Best Lyricist	Kshitij Patwardhan - "Alvida"	Nominated	
Fakt Marathi Cine Sanman	2022	Best Film	Chalchitra Company, Crazy Few Films	Nominated	
Fakt Marathi Cine Sanman	2022	Best Actress in a Supporting Role	Nirmiti Sawant	Nominated	
Fakt Marathi Cine Sanman	2022	Best Actress in a Supporting Role	Kshitee Jog	Nominated	
Fakt Marathi Cine Sanman	2022	Best Playback Singer Female	Vaishali Samant, Mugdha Karhade, Aarti Kelkar, Suhas Joshi - "Jhimma Title Song"	Nominated	
Fakt Marathi Cine Sanman	2022	Best Music Director	Amit Raj - "Jhimma Title Song"	Nominated	
Fakt Marathi Cine Sanman	2022	Best Lyricist	Kshtij Patwardhan - "Jhimma Title Song"	Nominated	
Maharashtra State Film Awards	2024	Best Supporting Actress	Kshitee Jog	Nominated	
Maharashtra State Film Awards	2024	Best Comedian Female	Nirmiti Sawant	Won	
Maharashtra State Film Awards	2024	Best Music Director	Amit Raj	Won	

== Sequel and remake ==
On 24 January 2023, a sequel of the film was announced titled as Jhimma 2. The sequel will be produced by Aanand L. Rai's Colour Yellow Productions and Chalchitra Mandalee. Hemant Dhome and Irawati Karnik would return as the director and writer respectively. It was released on 24 November 2023.

It was remade in 2025 Gujarati film Umbarro directed by Abhishek Shah.
