= Anandi Gopal =

2019 Marathi-language biographical film

- Theatrical release poster
- Directed by: Sameer Vidwans
- Written by: Karan Sharma; Irawati Karnik
- Based on: The life of Anandi Gopal Joshi
- Produced by: Akash Chawla; Shareen Mantri Kedia; Kishore Arora; Arunava Joy Sengupta
- Starring: Bhagyashree Milind; Lalit Prabhakar; Yogesh Soman; Kshitee Jog
- Cinematography: Akash Agarwal
- Edited by: Charu Shree Roy
- Music by: Hrishikesh-Saurabh-Jasraj
- Production companies: Zee Studios; Fresh Lime Films; Namah Pictures
- Release date: 15 February 2019
- Running time: 134 min
- Country: India
- Language: Marathi

Anandi Gopal is a 2019 Indian Marathi biographical film directed by Sameer Vidwans and written by Karan Sharma and Irawati Karnik. The film follows the life of Anandi Gopal Joshi. It was jointly produced by Akash Chawla with Shareen Mantri Kedia. Bhagyashree Milind played the role of Anandi Gopal Joshi whereas Lalit Prabhakar played the role of Gopalrao Joshi.

== Plot ==
The story revolves around the Anandi Gopal Joshi and her husband Gopalrao Joshi. Her birth name was Yamuna Joshi. She was born raised and married in Kalyan where her family had previously been landlords before experiencing financial losses. Due to pressure from her mother, she was married at the age of nine to Gopalrao Joshi, a widower almost twenty years her senior. After marriage, Gopalrao renamed her 'Anandi'. Gopalrao Joshi worked as a postal clerk in Kalyan. Later, he was transferred to Alibaug and then finally, to Kolhapur. He was a progressive thinker, and supported education for women.

At the age of fourteen, Anandibai gave birth to a boy, but the child lived only for a total of ten days due to lack of medical care. This proved to be a turning point in Anandi's life and inspired her to become a physician. After Gopalrao tried to enroll her in missionary schools and not working out, they moved to Calcutta. There she learned to read and speak Sanskrit and English.

Her husband encouraged her to study medicine. In 1880 he sent a letter to Royal Wilder, a well-known American missionary, stating his wife's interest in studying medicine in the United States and inquiring about a suitable post in the US for himself. Wilder published the correspondence in his Princeton's Missionary Review. Theodicia Carpenter, a resident of Roselle, New Jersey, happened to read it while waiting to see her dentist. Impressed by both Anandibai's desire to study medicine, and Gopalrao's support for his wife, she wrote to Anandibai. Carpenter and Anandibai developed a close friendship and came to refer to each other as "aunt" and "niece." Later, Carpenter would host Anandibai in Rochelle during Joshi's stay in the U.S.Pripas-Kapit, Sarah. Educating Women Physicians of the World: International Students of the Woman's Medical College of Pennsylvania, 1883-1911 (PhD). University of California, Los Angeles.

While the Joshi couple was in Calcutta, Anandibai's health was declining. She suffered from weakness, constant headaches, occasional fever, and sometimes breathlessness. Theodicia sent her medicines from America, without results. In 1883, Gopalrao was transferred to Serampore, and he decided to send Anandibai by herself to America for her medical studies despite her poor health. Though apprehensive, Gopalrao convinced her to set an example for other women by pursuing higher education.

A physician couple named Thorborn suggested that Anandibai apply to the Woman's Medical College of Pennsylvania. On learning of Anandibai's plans to pursue higher education in the West, orthodox Indian society censured her very strongly.

Anandibai addressed the community at Serampore College Hall, explaining her decision to go to America and obtain a medical degree. She discussed the persecution she and her husband had endured. She stressed the need for female doctors in India, emphasizing that Hindu women could better serve as physicians to Hindu women. Her speech received publicity, and financial contributions started pouring in from all over India.

Anandibai travelled to New York from Kolkata (Calcutta) by ship, chaperoned by two female English missionary acquaintances of the Thorborns. In New York, Theodicia Carpenter received her in June 1883. Anandibai wrote to the Woman's Medical College of Pennsylvania, asking to be admitted to their medical program, which was the second women's medical program in the world. Rachel Bodley, the dean of the college, enrolled her.

Anandibai began her medical training at age 19. In America, her health worsened because of the cold weather and unfamiliar diet. She contracted tuberculosis. Nevertheless, she graduated with an MD in March 1886; the topic of her thesis was "Obstetrics among the Aryan Hindoos." The thesis utilized references from both Ayurvedic texts and American medical textbooks. On her graduation, Queen Victoria sent her a congratulatory message.

== Cast ==
- Bhagyashree Milind as Anandi Gopal Joshi
- Ankita Goswami as young Anandi Gopal Joshi
- Lalit Prabhakar as Gopalrao Joshi
- Kshitee Jog as Anandibai's mother
- Yogesh Soman as Anandibai's father
- Geetanjali Kulkarni as Vimaltai; Gopalrao's mother-in-law
- Scott Knox as Dr. Andrew Lockhart
- Sonia Albizuri as Miss Macy
- Jayant Sawarkar as Soman Bhatj
- Atharva Kulkarni as Gopalrao's son
- Pradeep Patwardhan as Pandit
- Asmita Kale as Mrs. Godse
- Pratap Sonale as Shankar Bhandari
- Tushar Gaware as Extremist brahmin

== Production ==
Bhagyashree Milind was selected for the title role of Anandi Gopal in the film who previously seen in Balak-Palak and Ubuntu. The character of Gopalrao Joshi was played by Lalit Prabhakar.

== Soundtrack ==
Anandi Gopal

Soundtrack album by Hrishikesh-Saurabh-Jasraj
- Released: 22 January 2019
- Recorded: 2019
- Genre: Feature Film Soundtrack
- Language: Marathi
- Label: Zee Music Company
External audio
- Audio jukebox on YouTube

The songs were composed by Hrishikesh-Saurabh-Jasraj while lyrics written by Vaibhav Joshi. The album was released on 22 January 2019. The sound design was done by Bignya Dahal

All tracks are written by Vaibhav Joshi.

Track listing
No.	Title	Lyrics	Music	Singer(s)	Length
1.	"Rang Maliyela"	Vaibhav Joshi	Hrishikesh-Saurabh-Jasraj	Sharayu Date; Ketaki Mategaonkar	5:15
2.	"Anand Ghana"	Vaibhav Joshi	Hrishikesh-Saurabh-Jasraj	Hrishikesh Ranade; Aanandi Joshi	4:36
3.	"Waata Waata Ga"	Vaibhav	Hrishikesh-Saurabh-Jasraj	Priyanka Barve	2:48
4.	"Ghondal - Majhe Maauli"	Vaibhav Joshi	Hrishikesh-Saurabh-Jasraj	Jasraj Joshi	3:43
5.	"Tu Aahes Na"	Vaibhav Joshi	Hrishikesh-Saurabh-Jasraj	Rahul Deshpande, Adarsh Shinde, Rohit Raut, Avadhoot Gupte, Jasraj Joshi	4:30
6.	"Anthem - Tu Aahes Na"	Vaibhav Joshi	Hrishikesh-Saurabh-Jasraj	Rohit Raut, Adarsh Shinde, Rahul Deshpande, Jasraj Joshi	4:11
Total length:					25:23

== Reception ==
The film received positive reviews from critics. Mihir Bhanage from The Times of India gave it 4 out of 5 stars and concluding that, "This one is a must-watch for everyone and when you go to the cinema hall, make sure you stay for the end credits to roll. You won’t regret it."

Ganesh Matkari from Pune Mirror gave it 3.5 rating out of 5 and writes "Anandi Gopal could have ended on a sweeter note, avoiding the spoon-feeding bordering on propaganda. But ignore that, and you have a strong film that caters to your heart and mind."

== Accolades ==
Award	Category	Nominee	Result	Ref.
Pune International Film Festival	Sant Tukaram Best International Marathi Film	Sameer Vidhwans	Won	
Pune International Film Festival	Best Actor	Lalit Prabhakar	Won	
Zee Chitra Gaurav Puraskar 2020	Best Film	Sameer Vidhwans	Nominated	
Zee Chitra Gaurav Puraskar 2020	Best Director	Sameer Vidhwans	Nominated	
Zee Chitra Gaurav Puraskar 2020	Best Actress	Bhagyashree Milind	Nominated	
Zee Chitra Gaurav Puraskar 2020	Best Actor	Lalit Prabhakar	Won	
Zee Chitra Gaurav Puraskar 2020	Best Music Director	Hrishikesh-Saurabh-Jasraj	Won	
Zee Chitra Gaurav Puraskar 2020	Best Playback Singer	Anandi Joshi	Won	
Zee Chitra Gaurav Puraskar 2020	Best Lyricist	Vaibhav Joshi	Won	
Zee Chitra Gaurav Puraskar 2020	Best Makeup	D. N. Yerekar	Won	
Filmfare Marathi Awards 2020	Best Film	Sameer Vidhwans	Won	
Filmfare Marathi Awards 2020	Best Director	Sameer Vidhwans	Won	
Filmfare Marathi Awards 2020	Best Actress Critics	Bhagyashree Milind	Won	
Filmfare Marathi Awards 2020	Best Actor Critics	Lalit Prabhakar	Won	
Filmfare Marathi Awards 2020	Best Music Album	Hrishikesh-Saurabh-Jasraj	Won	
Filmfare Marathi Awards 2020	Best Screenplay	Karan Sharma	Won	
Filmfare Marathi Awards 2020	Best Dialogue	Irawati Karnik	Won	
Filmfare Marathi Awards 2020	Best Production Design	Nilesh Wagh	Won	
Filmfare Marathi Awards 2020	Best Cinematography	Akash Agarwal	Won	
Filmfare Marathi Awards 2020	Best Editing	Charu Shree Roy	Won	
67th National Film Awards	Best Film on Other Social Issues	Sameer Vidhwans	Won	
67th National Film Awards	Best Production Design	Sunil Nigwekar; Nilesh Wagh	Won	
Mata Sanman 2021	Best Film	Sameer Vidhwans	Won	
Mata Sanman 2021	Best Director	Sameer Vidhwans	Won	
Mata Sanman 2021	Best Actress	Bhagyashree Milind	Won	
Mata Sanman 2021	Best Playback Singer - Female	Priyanka Barve	Won	
Mata Sanman 2021	Best Lyricist	Vaibhav Joshi	Won	
Mata Sanman 2021	Best Production Design	Sunil Nigvekar; Nilesh Wagh	Won	
57th Maharashtra State Film Awards	Best Social Film	Sameer Vidhwans	Won	
57th Maharashtra State Film Awards	Best Director	Sameer Vidwans	Won	
57th Maharashtra State Film Awards	Best Art Director	Sunil Nigvekar; Nilesh Wagh	Won	
57th Maharashtra State Film Awards	Best Dialogue	Iravati karnik	Won	
57th Maharashtra State Film Awards	Best Actor	Lalit Prabhakar	Nominated	
57th Maharashtra State Film Awards	Best Actress	Bhagyashree Milind	Nominated	
57th Maharashtra State Film Awards	Best Female Playback Singer	Aanandi Joshi	Nominated	
57th Maharashtra State Film Awards	Best Male Playback Singer	Hrishikesh Ranade	Nominated	
