= Shrikrishna Janardan Joshi =

Indian writer (1915–1989)

Shrikrishna Janardan Joshi (1915–1989) was a Marathi novelist from Maharashtra, India.

== Career ==
He wrote several novels, short stories, and essays, including award-winning novel Anandi Gopal, which is a fictional account of the life of Anandi Gopal Joshi. The novel was later adapted into an award-winning play Anandi Gopal. In his writings, he harshly depicted Pune, where he lived, as a hub of Brahmin orthodoxy,.

He also authored a biography of R. D. Karve titled ' Raghunathachi Bakhar '.
