= Baai Tujhyapayi =

2025 Marathi-language web series

- Promotional poster
- Genre: Drama
- Created by: Nipun Dharmadhikari
- Written by: Mukta Bam; Nikhil Khaire
- Directed by: Nipun Dharmadhikari
- Starring: Kshitee Jog; Sajiri Joshi
- Country of origin: India
- Original language: Marathi
- No. of episodes: 7

Production
- Producers: Keyur Godse; Neeraj Biniwale
- Production company: Sixteen by Sixty-Four Productions PVT. LTD

Original release
- Network: ZEE5
- Release: 31 October 2025

Baai Tujhyapayi is a 2025 Indian Marathi language web series directed by Nipun Dharmadhikari and produced for the streaming platform ZEE5. It is a remake of 2023 Tamil web series Ayali. Set in rural Maharashtra in 1990, the period drama follows the story of a young girl who battles superstition and social restrictions in her pursuit of becoming a doctor. The series stars Sajiri Joshi and Kshitee Jog in the lead roles and premiered on 31 October 2025.

== Premise ==
The series is set in the 1990s in the fictional village of Vesaich Vadgaon, Maharashtra. It centers on Ahilya, a teenage girl who dreams of studying medicine and becoming a doctor. Her ambitions clash with the village’s orthodox customs and gender-based restrictions. When Ahilya attains puberty, she is forced to conceal it to avoid an early marriage, while continuing to challenge the social taboos that attempt to limit her education.

== Cast ==
- Kshitee Jog as Laxmi
- Sajiri Joshi as Ahilya
- Siddhesh Dhuri as Aaba
- Shivraj Waichal as Jaysingh
- Vibhawari Deshpande as Mangal Bai
- Anil More as Gopal Master
- Anil Kamble as Tatya Saheb
- Gautami Kachi as Saraswati

== Production ==
The series is directed by Nipun Dharmadhikari and written by Mukta Bam and Nikhil Khaire. It was developed as a Marathi original for the OTT platform ZEE5. Promotional materials describe it as a rural-period drama exploring themes of patriarchy, education, and superstition. The production design and costumes recreate the socio-cultural setting of a 1990s Maharashtrian village.

=== Release ===
The series was premiered on ZEE5 on 31 October 2025. The official trailer was released in October 2025.

== Episodes ==
No.	Title	Directed by	Original release date
1	"Vesai"	Nipun Dharmadhikari	31 October 2025
In a village that has married off girls at puberty for centuries, a schoolgirl named Ahilya sets her sights on becoming a doctor instead.
2	"Saraswati"	Nipun Dharmadhikari	31 October 2025
Ahilya devises a way to stay in school without revealing that she has come of age, worried about what will happen if the deception is discovered.
3	"Lakshmi"	Nipun Dharmadhikari	31 October 2025
Ahilya's mother grows suspicious, forcing her to weigh her daughter's ambitions against the customs she has always followed.
4	"Sharada"	Nipun Dharmadhikari	31 October 2025
Ahilya reaches the tenth grade, an unprecedented achievement for a girl in the village, and word of her situation begins to circulate among the residents.
5	"Pujarin"	Nipun Dharmadhikari	31 October 2025
The death of a young woman during childbirth pushes Ahilya to intervene when another villager faces the same danger.
6	"Mangal"	Nipun Dharmadhikari	31 October 2025
A storm following the rescue is blamed on divine anger, and Ahilya gives up something of her own to counter the accusation.
7	"Ahilya"	Nipun Dharmadhikari	31 October 2025
The women of the village, moved by Ahilya's example, join together against the tradition that has governed their lives.

== Reception ==
Reviews of Baai Tujhyapayi were mixed. Several critics praised its lead performances while raising concerns about the writing's reliance on melodrama and its faithfulness to the Tamil original.

M9 News gave the series a mixed-to-negative review, describing it as a largely faithful, scene-for-scene remake of Ayali that lacked the regional specificity that made the original distinctive, and calling its treatment "too simplistic, soapy, and old-fashioned to be memorable." The review praised Sajiri Joshi's performance as Ahilya as bright and vivid and Kshitee Jog's as moving, but was critical of Sarang Kulkarni's background score, calling it melodramatic, and found the cinematography and production design unable to bring the setting to life.

Shubham Kulkarni, writing for OTTplay, rated the series 3 out of 5, calling it an artful retelling that confronts patriarchy at its roots. He praised the show's visual language and cinematography as stunning, and found Kshitee Jog's performance as Laxmi outstanding, though he wrote that the story's pacing grew inconsistent in places, with some complex situations resolving too easily and certain character transitions feeling rushed.

Mihir Bhanage of The Times of India gave the series 3.5 out of 5, describing it as a well-executed and encouraging exploration of the difference between faith and blind faith. He praised the acting, sound and production design, and singled out Jog and Joshi's performances, but noted that the early episodes felt stretched, with some scenes over-explained.

Reviewing the series for Scroll.in, Nandini Ramnath wrote that the show successfully localises its Tamil source material and lays out the difference between blind faith and rational thought through sharply written scenes, praising the central relationship between Ahilya and her mother as one of its most memorable aspects. She found the show's early episodes carried their message lightly, but that the later episodes bordered on the fantastic and lost plausibility, ultimately concluding that the series had enough well-written scenes and a convincing setting to overcome the weaknesses of its ending.

Vinamra Mathur of Firstpost rated the series 3 out of 5, praising its cinematography for immersing viewers in the show's setting and comparing its atmosphere to Tumbbad. He wrote that the series was both heartwarming and heartbreaking, and noted that the ensemble cast, rather than any single star performance, allowed the story to come through.
