= Dwidha =

2025 Indian Marathi-language drama film

- Directed by: Nilesh Naik
- Written by: Nilesh Naik
- Produced by: Vidula Ajagaonkar
- Starring: Satish Pulekar; Manasi Kulkarni
- Cinematography: Simarjeet Suman; Ashwin Pakhrot; Sridhar Alle
- Edited by: Nilesh Naik
- Music by: Nilotpal Bora; Shailendra Barve
- Production company: Spinning Wheel Productions
- Release dates: 13 November 2025 (Jagran Film Festival); 4 September 2026
- Running time: 99 minutes
- Country: India
- Language: Marathi

Dwidha (transl. Dilemma) is a 2025 Indian Marathi-language drama film written, directed and edited by Nilesh Naik and produced under the banner of Spinning Wheel Productions. The film stars Manasi Kulkarni and Satish Pulekar in the lead roles, with Renuka Daftardar, Nimish Kulkarni, and Astad Kale in supporting roles. The film revolves around a woman torn between keeping her promise to her ailing father and returning to America with her husband for the future of her unborn child.

The film premiered at the 2025 Jagran Film Festival. It was theatrically released on 4 September 2026 on a limited number of screens and received a positive response, particularly for its subject matter, direction, and performances.

== Plot ==
Shravani, a woman who returns to her family home in Vasai after spending five years in the United States with her husband, hopes to start a new chapter in her life after enduring the emotional trauma of a previous miscarriage. She dreams of becoming a mother again, but her return takes an unexpected turn when she discovers that her father, with whom she shares a deep bond, is seriously ill.

Having lost her mother at a young age, Shravani was raised by her father, who made numerous sacrifices for her. As a child, she had promised him that she would never abandon him, making her decision to stay by his side during his final days deeply personal.

Meanwhile, her husband urges her to return to the US, believing that giving birth there would provide better opportunities and citizenship benefits for their child. Shravani is therefore caught between two equally important responsibilities, the promise she made to the father who devoted his life to her and the future she hopes to build for her unborn child. Caught between love, duty, marriage and family, Shravani struggles to make a choice without losing someone she deeply loves.

== Cast ==
- Manasi Kulkarni as Shravani Naik
  - Ovi Tanavade as young Shravani
- Satish Pulekar as Manohar Naik (Dada), Shravani's father
  - Pushkar Sarad as young Manohar
- Renuka Daftardar as Bebi Aatya
- Nimish Kulkarni as Aditya, Aatya's son
- Tanvi Kulkarni as Grace, Shravani’s friend
- Astad Kale as Kaustubh, Shravani's husband
- Vishal Navare as Dr. Kelkar
- Swapna Durve as Shravani's mother
- Prafulla Samant as Shravani's father-in-law
- Hemangi Velankar as Shravani's mother-in-law
- Anushree Vadhavkar
- Varsha Gawand as Caretaker
- Bhushan Kadu as Datta, Manohar's house help
- Arun Pandarkar as Satish, Kaustubh’s friend
- Karishma Desale as Sayaali
- Vishwas Navare
- Shantanu Ambadekar
- Siddhesh Salokhe
- Raj Kasurde
- Dnyanesh Wadekar

== Production ==
Manasi Kulkarni's real-life daughter portrays her character's younger self in the film. The film also marks the acting debut of Nimish Kulkarni, who is known for his appearances on Maharashtrachi Hasyajatra.

== Sountrack ==
Track listing
No.	Title	Lyrics	Music	Singer(s)	Length
1.	"Kallol"	Mandar Cholkar	Shailendra Barve	Mayuri Patwardhan	3:03
2.	"Baba"	Mangesh Kangane	Nilotpal Bora	Hansika Pareek	3:00
Total length:					6:03

== Release and reception ==
The film showed at the Jagran Film Festival, Pune International Film Festival, Indo-German Film Week and NAFA Film Festival.

Madhavi Wadkar of Navarashtra gave the film 4 out of 5 stars, describing it as "not just a film about a decision faced by a girl, but a film about the conflict between relationships, duty, parental love and practical decisions made for the future." Kalpeshraj Kubal of Maharashtra Times gave the film 3 out of 5 stars, praising its direction, cinematography, and performances, and observed, "What is special is that there are many scenes in the film where silence speaks louder than dialogue." Santosh Bhingarde of Sakal also rated the film 3 out of 5 stars, noting, "Along with the conflicts in the relationship, emotional warmth, duty and loyalty, he [Nilesh Naik] has beautifully depicted the aspects of love, intimacy and affection."

== See also ==
- List of Marathi films of 2026
