= Hemant Dhome =

Indian filmmaker, screenwriter and actor (born 1986)

- Born: 21 March 1986 (age 40); Pune, Maharashtra, India
- Occupations: Actor; screenwriter; film director
- Years active: 2010–present
- Spouse: Kshitee Jog (m. 2012)
- Family: Jog family

Hemant Dhome (born 21 March 1986) is an Indian filmmaker and actor known for his works in Marathi cinema.

== Personal life ==
Dhome was born on 21 March 1986 in Pune, to a Marathi family. He fell in love with actress Kshitee Jog while on Saavdhaan Shubhamangal play rehearsals. The couple got married in a private ceremony on 10 December 2012 at their home in Pune.

== Career ==
Dhome began his acting career in 2010 with a role in the Marathi ensemble romantic family drama film Kshanbhar Vishranti, directed by Sachit Patil, where he starred opposite Kadambari Kadam. The film was not received well at the box office but gained popularity through repeated television broadcasts. After a gap of a year, in 2012, he played the lead opposite Anushka Dandekar in the drama Jai Jai Maharashtra Majha. While the film had a patriotic theme, The Times of India review was critical of Dhome's performance. That same year, he began his journey as a writer with Aditya Sarpotdar's romantic musical Satrangi Re, marking his first major contribution off-screen.

The following year he played a brief role in Mangalashtak Once More, a romantic drama that explored the intricacies of married life.

In 2014, he featured in two comedy films—Hututu and Aandhali Koshimbir. In Kanchan Adhikari's Hututu, he portrayed a carefree, irresponsible youth who prioritized pleasure over responsibility, often clashing with his father's values and resisting the idea of sacrificing his freedom for family happiness. Aandhali Koshimbir, which revolved around the generational gap between parents and children, was critically acclaimed. The Times of India reviewer praised Dhome's performance, noting that "Hemant delivers punch lines with ease."

Dhome took on a negative role in 2025 romantic comedy Online Binline, a love triangle featuring Siddharth Chandekar and Rutuja Shinde. The film explored the dynamics of modern relationships and digital romance, focusing on how two friends fall for the same girl through online interactions. Mihir Bhanage of The Times of India wrote, "Dhome finally gets a role that not just gives him scope to display his comic timing (which, he does remarkably well) but also gives him the opportunity to show his acting acumen."

== Filmography ==
=== Films ===
†	Denotes Upcoming films

Year	Title	Actor	Director	Writer	Role	Notes	Ref.
2010	Kshanbhar Vishranti	Yes	No	Yes	Abhijeet		
2012	Jai Jai Maharashtra Majha	Yes	No	No	Vishal Singh Mohite		
2012	Satrangi Re	No	No	Yes			
2013	Mangalashtak Once More	Yes	No	No			
2014	Hututu	Yes	No	No	Aishwarya		
2014	Aandhali Koshimbir	Yes	No	No	Vashya		
2015	Kaay Raav Tumhi	Yes	No	No	Chaitanya		
2015	Online Binline	Yes	No	No	Idya		
2016	Poster Girl	Yes	No	Yes	Suraj		
2016	Fuddu	Yes	No	No		Hindi film	
2017	Baghtos Kay Mujra Kar	Yes	Yes	Yes	Samsher Patil		
2017	Fugay	No	No	Yes			
2017	Bus Stop	Yes	No	No	Keshav		
2019	Ye Re Ye Re Paisa 2	No	Yes	No			
2019	Hirkani	Yes	No	No	Shahir		
2020	Choricha Mamla	Yes	No	No	Amarjit Patil		
2021	Jhimma	Yes	Yes	Yes	Nikhil		
2022	Sunny	No	Yes	Yes			
2023	Satarcha Salman	No	Yes	Yes			
2023	Phakaat	Yes	No	No	Saleem		
2023	Date Bhet	Yes	No	No	Rohan		
2023	Jhimma 2	No	Yes	Yes			
2025	Fussclass Dabhade	No	Yes	Yes			
2026	Krantijyoti Vidyalay Marathi Madhyam	No	Yes	Yes			

=== Television ===
Year	Title	Role	Channel	Notes	Ref.
2020	Chandra Aahe Sakshila	Nanna	Colors Marathi		

=== Theatre ===
- Nava Gadee Nave Rajya
- Saavdhaan Shubhamangal

== Frequent artist collaborations as director ==
†	Collaborated as artist in the film

Artist(s)	Baghtos Kay Mujra Kar (2017)	Ye Re Ye Re Paisa 2 (2019)	Jhimma (2021)	Sunny (2022)	Satarcha Salman (2023)	Jhimma 2 (2023)	Fussclass Dabhade (2025)	Krantijyoti Vidyalay Marathi Madhyam (2026)	Total
Actor
Akshay Tanksale	Yes				Yes				2
Amey Wagh							Yes	Yes	2
Anant Jog			Yes			Yes		Yes	3
Aniket Vishwasrao	Yes	Yes			Yes				3
Harish Dudhade							Yes	Yes	2
Jitendra Joshi	Yes				Yes			Yes	3
Kshitee Jog			Yes	Yes		Yes	Yes	Yes	5
Mrinmayee Godbole		Yes	Yes						2
Nirmiti Sawant			Yes			Yes		Yes	3
Sayali Sanjeev			Yes		Yes	Yes		Yes	4
Shivani Surve					Yes	Yes			2
Siddharth Chandekar			Yes			Yes	Yes	Yes	4
Sonalee Kulkarni	Yes		Yes						2
Suchitra Bandekar			Yes			Yes			2
Suhas Joshi			Yes			Yes			2
Suyog Gorhe					Yes		Yes		2
Music composer
Aditya Bedekar			Yes			Yes	Yes	Yes	4
Amitraj	Yes				Yes	Yes	Yes		4
Writer
Irawati Karnik			Yes	Yes		Yes			3
Cinematographer
Satyajeet Shobha Shriram				Yes		Yes	Yes	Yes	4
Sanjay K. Memane		Yes	Yes						2
Editor
Faisal Mahadik		Yes	Yes	Yes	Yes	Yes	Yes		6
Imran Mahadik		Yes	Yes	Yes	Yes				4

== Awards and nominations ==
Year	Award	Nominated work	Category	Result	Ref.
2017	Filmfare Awards Marathi	Poshter Girl	Best Story	Nominated	
2018	Maharashtracha Favourite Kon?	Baghtos Kay Mujra Kar	Favourite Villain	Nominated	
2020	Maharashtracha Favourite Kon?	Ye Re Ye Re Paisa 2	Favourite Director	Nominated	
2020	Zee Talkies Comedy Awards	Choricha Mamla	Best Supporting Actor	Nominated	
2022	City Cine Awards	Jhimma	Best Director	Won	
2022	Filmfare Awards Marathi	Jhimma	Best Director	Nominated	
2022	Filmfare Awards Marathi	Jhimma	Best Story	Nominated	
2022	Filmfare Awards Marathi	Choricha Mamla	Best Supporting Actor	Nominated	
2022	Majja Digital Awards	Jhimma	Outstanding Director	Won	
2022	Majja Digital Awards	Jhimma	Outstanding Writer	Won	
2023	Filmfare Awards Marathi	Sunny	Best Story	Nominated	
2024	Maharashtracha Favourite Kon?	Jhimma 2	Favourite Director	Nominated	
2024	Filmfare Awards Marathi	Jhimma 2	Best Director	Nominated	
2024	Filmfare Awards Marathi	Jhimma 2	Best Story	Nominated	
2025	Maharashtra State Film Awards	Sunny	Best Social Film Director	Nominated	
2026	Filmfare Awards Marathi	Fussclass Dabhade	Best Director	Nominated	
2026	Filmfare Awards Marathi	Fussclass Dabhade	Best Dialogue	Nominated	

== See also ==
- Chalchitra Mandalee
