= One Two Cha Cha Chaa =

2026 Indian action adventure comedy film

- Theatrical release poster
- Directed by: Abhishek Raj; Rajneesh Thakur
- Produced by: Sajan Gupta; Vijay Lalwani; Ntasha Sethi
- Starring: Nyrraa M Banerji; Lalit Prabhakar; Anant Joshi; Ashutosh Rana; Abhimanyu Singh; Mukesh Tiwari; Harsh Mayar
- Cinematography: Amol Gole
- Edited by: Ranjit Bahadur
- Production company: Pellucidar Production
- Release date: 16 January 2026
- Running time: 160 minutes
- Country: India
- Language: Hindi

One Two Cha Cha Chaa is a 2026 Indian Hindi-language action adventure comedy film directed by Abhishek Raj and Rajneesh Thakur. The film stars Nyrraa M Banerji, Ashutosh Rana, Lalit Prabhakar, Abhimanyu Singh, Mukesh Tiwari, Harsh Mayar, and Anant V. Joshi. It was theatrically released on 16 January 2026.

== Cast ==
- Nyrraa M Banerji as Shoma
- Lalit Prabhakar as Sanjeev
- Anant Joshi as Sadda
- Ashutosh Rana as Ved Prakash Jaiswal
- Abhimanyu Singh as Bhura Singh
- Mukesh Tiwari as Inspector Yadav
- Harsh Mayar as Lappu
- Hemal Ingle as Mishty
- Ashok Pathak
- Chittaranjan Giri as Chaube

== Production ==
The film is directed by Abhishek Raj and co-directed by Rajneesh Thakur. It is produced by Sajan Gupta, Vijay Lalwani and Ntasha Sethi. The film's production design is handled by Bijon Dasgupta, cinematography by Amol Gole, and choreography by Chinni Prakash and Adil Shaikh.

== Release ==
The film is released on 16 January 2026.

== Reception ==
Archika Khurana of The Times of India gave 2.5 stars out of 5 and writes that "One Two Cha Cha Chaa is loud, messy, and over-the-top without being consistently funny. While Ashutosh Rana’s wholehearted embrace of silliness adds charm, it isn’t enough to salvage a film that overstays its welcome." Simran Singh of DNA observed that "Overall, One Two Cha Cha Cha is an honest attempt at character-based comedy. It may not aim for non-stop laughter, but it offers a pleasant, easy-going experience. For viewers looking for controlled humour and light entertainment without overthinking, this film makes for a decent watch on the big screen."

Vinamra Mathur of Firstpost gave 3 stars out of 5 and said that "Directors Abhishek Raj Khemka and Rajneesh Thakur make a conscious effort to keep the film rooted in situational comedy." Amit Bhatia of ABP News rated it 3.5/5 stars and writes that "It is a riotous entertainer from start to finish, blending laugh-out-loud comedy with heartfelt moments. Strong performances and tight pacing make it a must-watch."

Zoom gave it 3 stars out of 5 and said that "One Two Cha Cha Chaa is not a film that seeks to impress with depth or nuanced storytelling. Instead, it proudly offers loud, chaotic entertainment driven by Ashutosh Rana’s standout performance and a lively ensemble cast."
