= MFK Award for Style Icon of the Year =

Indian film award

Maharashtracha Favourite Kon? for Style Icon of the Year
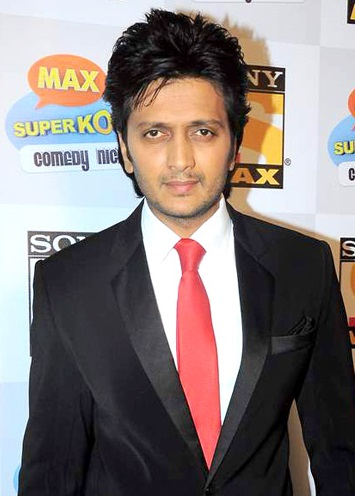
- Awarded for: Style Icon of the Year
- Country: India
- Presented by: Zee Talkies
- First award: Ankush Chaudhari
- Currently held by: Riteish Deshmukh

The Style Icon of the Year is a film award in India given by Zee Talkies as part of its annual Maharashtracha Favourite Kon? ceremony for Marathi films. The award was first given in 2009.

== Winners and nominees ==
Year	Photos of winners	Actor	Ref.
2009		Ankush Chaudhari	
2009		Sachin Pilgaonkar	
2009		Shreyas Talpade	
2010		Ankush Chaudhari	
2010		Atul Kulkarni	
2010		Mahesh Manjrekar	
2011		Aniket Vishwasrao	
2011		Jitendra Joshi	
2011		Santosh Juvekar	
2012		Ankush Chaudhari	
2012		Santosh Juvekar	
2012		Adinath Kothare	
2013		Swapnil Joshi	
2013		Ankush Chaudhari	
2013		Adinath Kothare	
2013		Umesh Kamat	
2013		Sushant Shelar	
2013		Aniket Vishwasrao	
2014		Riteish Deshmukh	
2015		Ankush Chaudhari	
2015		Riteish Deshmukh	
2015		Swapnil Joshi	
2015		Shreyas Talpade	
2015		Vaibhav Tatwawadi	
2015		Gashmeer Mahajani	
2016		Aakash Thosar	
2016		Swapnil Joshi	
2016		Ankush Chaudhari	
2016		Vaibhav Tatwawadi	
2016		Gashmeer Mahajani	
2016		Siddharth Chandekar	
2017		Amey Wagh	
2017		Abhinay Berde	
2017		Swapnil Joshi	
2017		Aakash Thosar	
2017		Ankush Chaudhari	
2017		Vaibhav Tatwawadi	
2017		Gashmeer Mahajani	
2018		Swapnil Joshi	
2018		Lalit Prabhakar	
2018		Amey Wagh	
2018		Ankush Chaudhari	
2018		Siddharth Chandekar	
2018		Umesh Kamat	
2019		Ankush Chaudhari	
2019		Swapnil Joshi	
2019		Amey Wagh	
2019		Siddharth Jadhav	
2019		Adinath Kothare	
2019		Aakash Thosar	
2021		Ritesh Deshmukh	
2021		Ankush Chaudhari	
2021		Aniket Vishwasrao	
2021		Swapnil Joshi	
2021		Aakash Thosar	
2021		Amey Wagh	
2022		Ritesh Deshmukh	
2022		Ankush Chaudhari	
2022		Swapnil Joshi	
2022		Siddharth Jadhav	
2022		Amey Wagh	
2022		Lalit Prabhakar	
2023		Ritesh Deshmukh	
2023		Swapnil Joshi	
2023		Ankush Chaudhari	
2023		Lalit Prabhakar	
2023		Siddharth Chandekar	
2023		Amey Wagh	
2023		Siddharth Jadhav	
