= Anandi Gopal Joshi =

One of the first female Indian doctors

Anandibai Gopal Joshi
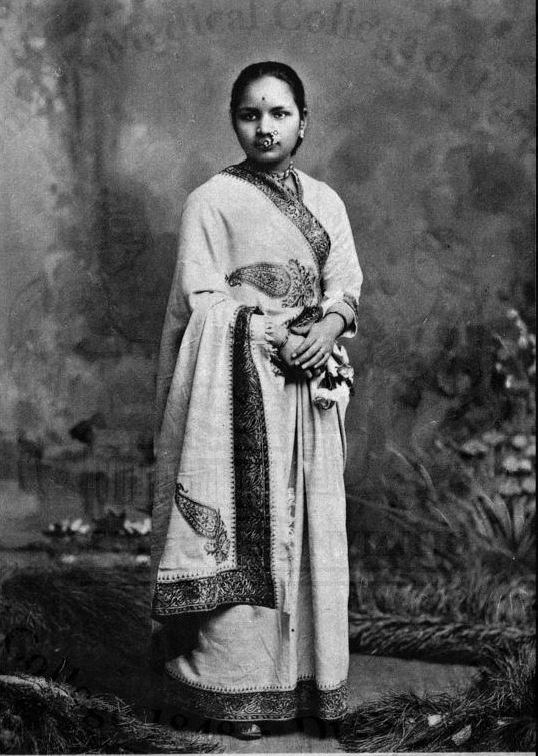
- A portrait photo of Anandibai Joshi
- Born: Yamuna Joshi; 31 March 1865; Kalyan, Bombay Presidency, British India
- Died: 26 February 1887 (aged 21); Poona, Bombay Presidency, British India
- Resting place: Poughkeepsie, New York, United States
- Education: Woman's Medical College of Pennsylvania
- Spouse: Gopalrao Joshi
- Relatives: Pandita Ramabai (cousin)

Anandibai Gopalrao Joshi (Marathi: आनंदीबाई गोपाळराव जोशी; 31 March 1865 – 26 February 1887) was the first certified Indian female doctor of western medicine while Kadambini Ganguly was the first Indian female doctor who actually practiced. Both got their degree in western medicine in 1886.

Anandibai travelled to New York from Kolkata (Calcutta) by ship, chaperoned by two female English missionary acquaintances of the Thorborns. The George Robinson the Viceroy of India had funded her education. She was the first woman from the erstwhile Bombay presidency of British India to study and graduate with a two-year degree in western medicine in the United States. She was also referred to as Anandibai Joshi and Anandi Gopal Joshi (where Gopal came from Gopalrao, her husband's first name).

== Early life ==
Anandi Baii Joshi's birth name was Yamuna and she was born in Kalyan, on 31 March 1865, the fifth of nine children. She was raised in a Marathi Chitpavan Brahmin family Keeping with the traditions of the time and under the pressure from her mother, she was married at the age of nine to Gopalrao Joshi, who was a widower and twenty years older than her. After marriage, Yamuna's husband renamed her 'Anandi'. Gopalrao Joshi worked as a postal clerk in Kalyan. Later, he was transferred to Alibag, and then, finally, to Kolhapur. He was a progressive thinker, and, unusually for that time, supported education for women. During the nineteenth century, most girls in India were expected to marry young and focus on responsibilities at home instead of education. Support for women's education was uncommon at the time. Historians have noted that Gopalrao Joshi encouraging Anandibai to study was unusual for the time and played a major role in her decision to pursue medicine later in life. Anandibai was also a cousin of Pandita Ramabai (1858–1922), an Indian social reformer, educator, and advocate for women's rights.

At the age of fourteen, Anandibai gave birth to a boy, but the child lived only for a total of ten days due to lack of medical care. This proved to be a turning point in Anandi's life and inspired her to become a physician. After Gopalrao tried to enroll her in missionary schools but failed, they moved to Calcutta. There she was able to learn how to read and speak Sanskrit and English.

== Academic life ==
Her husband encouraged her to study medicine despite societal opposition. In 1880, he wrote a letter to Royal Wilder, a well-known American missionary, expressing his wife's interest in studying medicine and inquiring about opportunities in the United States Wilder published the correspondence in his Princeton's Missionary Review. Theodicia Carpenter, a resident of Roselle, New Jersey, happened to read it while waiting to see her dentist. Impressed by both Anandibai's desire to study medicine, and Gopalrao's support for his wife, she wrote to Anandibai. Carpenter and Anandibai developed a close friendship and came to refer to each other as "aunt" and "niece." Later, Carpenter would host Anandibai in Rochelle during Joshi's stay in the U.S.

Before leaving for America, Anandibai addressed the community at Serampore College Hall in 1883, explaining her decision to go to America and to pursue a medical degree. She discussed the persecution she and her husband had endured. She stressed the need for female doctors in India. She argued that Hindu women, constrained by cultural norms, would feel more comfortable receiving medical care from female doctors rather than male physicians.

== Married life ==
In the 1800s, it was very unusual for husbands to focus on their wives' education. Gopalrao was obsessed with the idea of Anandibai's education and wanted her to learn medicine and create her own identity in the world. But this obsession turned out to be abusive. One day, he came into the kitchen and found her cooking with her grandmother and proceeded to go into a raging fit. It was very uncommon for husbands to beat their wives for cooking instead of reading. As Gopalrao's obsession with Joshi's education grew, he sent her with Mrs Carpenter, a Philadelphian missionary, to America to study medicine. Before her voyage, she addressed a public hall in 1883. She addressed the lack of women doctors and said "I volunteer myself as one."

== In the United States ==
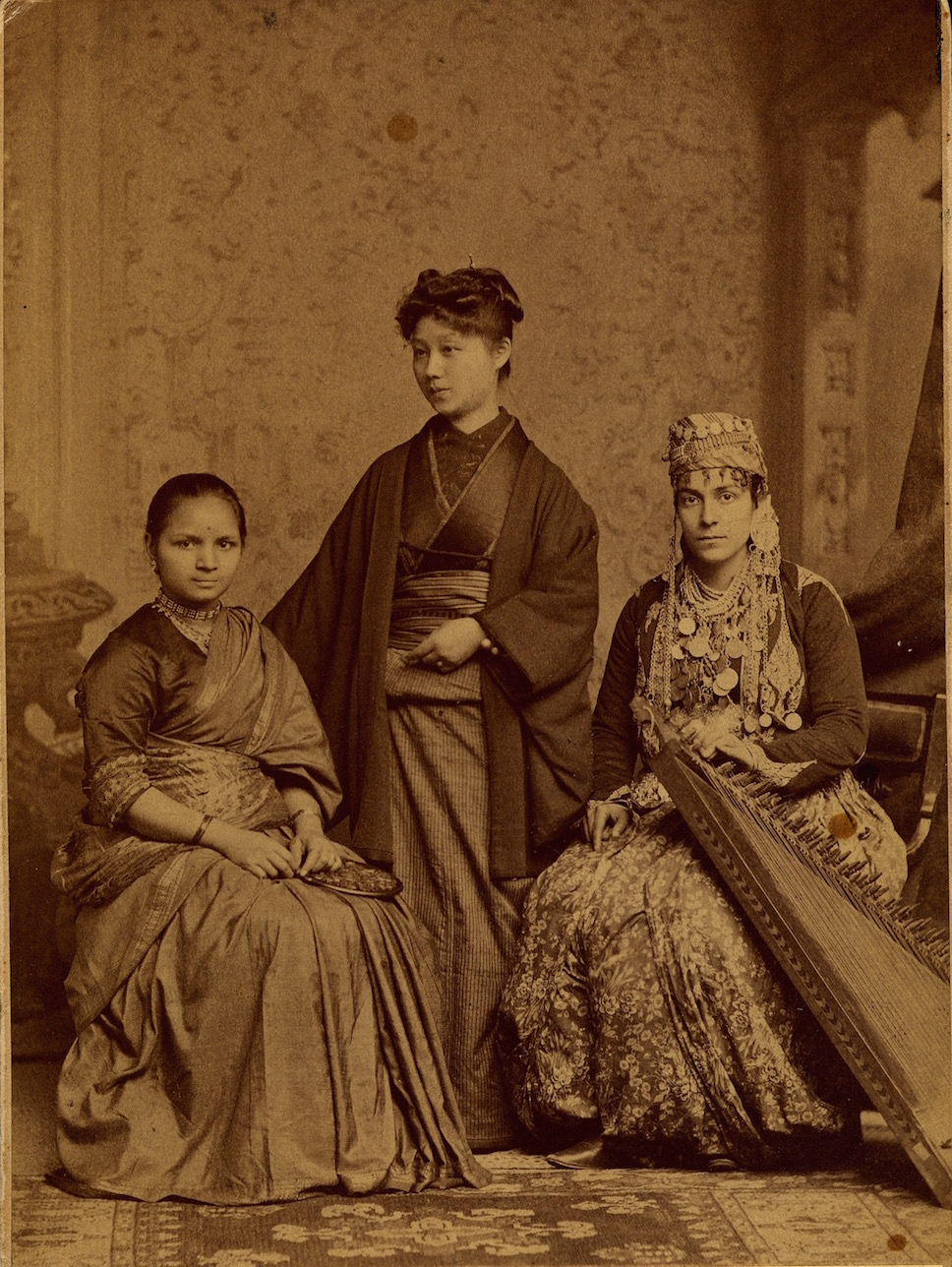
Anandibai Joshee graduated from Woman's Medical College of Pennsylvania (WMCP) in 1886. Seen here with Kei Okami (center) and Sabat Islambooly (right). All three completed their medical studies and each of them was among the first women from their respective countries to obtain a degree in Western medicine.

Anandibai travelled to New York from Kolkata (Calcutta) by ship, chaperoned by two female English missionary acquaintances of the Thorborns. They helped her arrange her travel and ensured she would have appropriate chaperones with her for the journey. The Viceroy of India had contributed a total of 200 rupees to fund her education. In New York, Theodicia Carpenter, her American host, received her in June 1883. Anandibai wrote to the Woman's Medical College of Pennsylvania in Philadelphia, which was the second women's medical program in the world. She asked to be admitted to the school, indicating that she wanted to earn a medical degree because her "poor suffering country women...would rather die...than accept [medical aid] at the hands of a male physician”. Rachel Bodley, the dean of the college, enrolled her.

Anandibai began her medical training at age 19, making her one of the first Indian women to formally train in Western medicine. While studying in the United States, Anandibai faced many challenges adjusting to life abroad. She struggled with the cold climate, different food, and being far away from home. Even while studying Western medicine, she continued following many Hindu traditions. Researchers later described this balance between traditional Indian beliefs and Western education as an important part of her identity. Modern scholars have described Anandibai's journey to America an important moment in the history of women in medicine. At a time when very few Indian women were able to travel abroad for education, her decision to study medicine in the United States inspired many generations of women. Recent scholarship have studied the letters she wrote to India while studying in America. In her letters, she struggled with embracing the Western education versus maintaining her Hindu identity. Joshi remained committed to her Hindu traditions and values, choosing not to fully adopt Western customs despite societal pressure.

In America, her health worsened because of the cold weather and unfamiliar diet. She contracted tuberculosis. Nevertheless, she graduated with her medical degree on 11 March 1886 at twenty-one years old. Pandita Ramabai also came as a guest of honor. The topic of her thesis was "Obstetrics among the Aryan Hindus." The thesis incorporated references from classic Ayurvedic texts and American medical textbooks, showing her effort to bridge Indian and Western medical knowledge. Her achievement caught international attention, and even Queen Victoria sent Anandibai a congratulatory message on her graduation.

== Return to India ==
On November 16, 1886, Anandibai returned to India and was welcomed with great admiration and celebration for her achievements. Her return was seen as a moment of national pride, especially for advocates of women's education and healthcare reform, Soon after, she was appointed as the physician-in-charge the female ward of the local Albert Edward Hospital.

== Death ==
Before she had the opportunity to begin her medical practice, Anandibai's health continued to deteriorate due to tuberculosis, which she contracted while in the United States. Anandibai died on 26 February 1887 in Pune, just weeks before turning 22. Years preceding her death, she was fatigued and felt constant weaknesses. Medicine was sent to her from America but there were no results so she kept studying medicine until her final days. Her death was mourned throughout India. Her ashes were sent to Theodicia Carpenter, who placed them in her family cemetery at the Poughkeepsie Rural Cemetery in Poughkeepsie, New York. The inscription states that Anandi Joshi was a Hindu Brahmin girl, the first Brahmin woman to receive education abroad and to obtain a medical degree.

== Modern views on Anandibai Joshi ==
In recent years, historians and researchers have continued studying Anandibai Joshi's life and accomplishments. Many scholars believe her story is important because she challenged traditional expectations for women during the nineteenth century. Historian Meera Kosambi wrote that Anandibai's speeches and letters showed early ideas about women's independence and education during a period when women's voices were often ignored.

Researchers have also studied the way Anandibai has been represented in biographies over time. Some biographies focused mainly on her marriage and personal life, while others highlighted her achievements in education and medicine. Some researchers believe the different ways Anandibais's stories were told reflected changing views on women's rights and feminism in India over time.

Some historians have also connected Anandibai's experiences to larger discussions about colonialism and the roles women were expected to have in India at the time. Researchers believe her decision to study medicine challenged traditional expectations for women during the colonial period. Wanting an education and a medical career was considered very unusual then, especially for women with more traditional families.

Modern researchers also recognize Anandibai as one of the early women who helped shape the history of medicine in South Asia. Even though she died at a young age, many scholars believe her accomplishments inspired future generations of women to pursue higher education and careers in healthcare.

== Legacy ==
In 1888, American feminist writer Caroline Wells Healey Dall wrote Joshi's biography. Dall was acquainted with Joshi and admired her greatly. However, certain points in the biography, particularly its harsh treatment of Gopalrao Joshi, sparked controversy among Joshi's friends.

Doordarshan, an Indian public service broadcaster aired a Hindi series based on her life, called "Anandi Gopal," directed by Kamlakar Sarang. Shrikrishna Janardan Joshi wrote a fictionalized account of her life in his Marathi novel Anandi Gopal, which was adapted into a play by Ram G. Joglekar.

Dr. Anjali Kirtane has extensively researched the life of Dr. Anandibai Joshi and has written a Marathi book entitled "डॉ. आनंदीबाई जोशी काळ आणि कर्तृत्व" ("Dr. Anandibai Joshi: her times and accomplishments") which contains rare photographs of Dr. Anandibai Joshi.

The Institute for Research and Documentation in Social Sciences (IRDS), a non-governmental organization from Lucknow, has been awarding the Anandibai Joshi Award for Medicine in honour of her early contributions to the cause of advancing medical science in India. In addition, the Government of Maharashtra has established a fellowship in her name for young women working on women's health.

Modern feminist scholars continue to study Anadibai Joshi's life because of her influence on women's education and healthcare in India. Her story is often connected to more discussions about women's rights, medical education, and social reform during the nineteenth century.

On 31 March 2018, Google honored her with a Google Doodle to mark her 153rd birth anniversary.

Anandi Gopal, an Indian biographical film on her life in Marathi by Sameer Vidwans released in 2019. It stars Bhagyashree Milind in the titular role, Lalit Prabhakar as her husband - Gopalrao Joshi and Yogesh Soman as her father - Ganpatrao Amriteshwar Joshi. In 2017, a Gujarati-language play titled Dr. Anandibai Joshi, directed by Manoj Shah, premiered at the National Centre for the Performing Arts.

Recent scholarship highlights Joshi as an early feminist thinker who challenged the oppression of women and advocated for their education and healthcare. Historian Meera Kosambi describes her writings as evidence of an emerging, though fragmented, feminist consciousness in a time when women's voices were often marginalized.

== Bibliography ==
- Mrs. Caroline Healey Dall (1888). The Life of Dr. Anandabai Joshee. Roberts Brothers, Boston.
- Eron, Carol (1979). "Medicine and Health Care". In O'Neill, Lois Decker (ed.). The Women's Book of World Records and Achievements. Anchor Press. p. 204. ISBN 0385127332. "First Hindu Woman Doctor"
- Kosambi, Meera, "Caste and Outcast (review)". Journal of Colonialism and Colonial History – Volume 4, Number 1, Spring 2003, The Johns Hopkins University Press
- Anandibai Joshi: India’s first woman doctor (1865–1887)
- Between the Lines, an 18-minute English documentary on the life of Anandi Joshi
- Madhukar Vasudev Dhond, "Jalyatil Chandra" (Marathi) (Rajhans Prakashan, 11993)
- Documents at the Drexel University College of Medicine Archives and Special Collections on Women in Medicine and referencing Anandi Gopal Joshi
