= Fakt Marathi Cine Sanman for Best Music Director =

Awards for Best Music Director

- Awarded for: Best Music Director
- Country: India
- Presented by: Fakt Marathi
- First award: Rahul Deshpande, Me Vasantrao (2022)
- Currently held by: Ajay-Atul, Maharashtra Shahir (2023)

The Fakt Marathi Cine Sanman for Music Director is given by the Fakt Marathi television network as part of its annual awards for Marathi Cinemas. The winners are selected by a jury. The award was first given in 2022.

The following lists the award recipients (in bold text) and the nominees of the respective years.

== Recipients and nominees ==
| Year | Photos of recipients | Nominees | Film | Ref. |
|---|---|---|---|---|
| 2022 | | **Rahul Deshpande** | **Me Vasantrao** **– "Punav Raticha"** | |
| 2022 | | Devdutta Manisha Baji | Pawankhind – "Yugat Mandli" | |
| 2022 | | Amitraj | Jhimma – "Jhimma Title Song" | |
| 2022 | | Vijay Narayan Gavande | Soyrik – "Anand Harpla" | |
| 2022 | | Chinar-Mahesh | Dharmaveer – "Kaina" | |
| 2023 | | **Ajay-Atul** | **Maharashtra Shahir** | |
| 2023 | | Ajay-Atul | Ved | |
| 2023 | | Amitraj | Ravrambha | |
| 2023 | | A.V. Prafullachandra | Ghar Banduk Biryani | |
| 2023 | | Vijay Narayan Gavande | Sarla Ek Koti | |
| 2023 | | Sameer Saptiskar | Ananya | |
