= Premachi Goshta 2 =

2025 Indian Marathi-language film by Satish Rajwade

- Theatrical release poster
- Directed by: Satish Rajwade
- Written by: Abhijeet Guru
- Produced by: Sanjay Chhabria; Amit Bhanushali
- Starring: Lalit Prabhakar; Ridhima Pandit; Rucha Vaidya; Swapnil Joshi; Bhau Kadam
- Cinematography: Prasad Bhende
- Edited by: Faisal Mahadik
- Music by: Avinash–Vishwajeet
- Production company: Everest Entertainment
- Distributed by: PVR Inox Pictures
- Release date: 21 October 2025
- Country: India
- Language: Marathi

Premachi Goshta 2 is an Indian Marathi-language romantic film directed by Satish Rajwade and written by Abhijeet Guru. The film stars Lalit Prabhakar, Ridhima Pandit, Rucha Vaidya, Swapnil Joshi, and Bhau Kadam in lead roles. The film was released on 21 October 2025 in theatres, coinciding Diwali.

== Plot ==
Arjun Mapuskar (Lalit Prabhakar), a disillusioned man struggling to come to terms with his failed marriage, believes that the saying “marriages are made in heaven” is nothing more than a cruel joke. Once deeply in love with his childhood best friend, Mary (Rucha Vaidya), Arjun now finds himself questioning the very idea of destiny and divine will. However, when the universe intervenes in mysterious ways, Arjun is unexpectedly offered a second chance at the life he always desired. As he navigates this extraordinary turn of events, he soon discovers that even miracles come with conditions and that fate's generosity often carries a hidden price.

== Cast ==
- Lalit Prabhakar as Arjun Mapuskar
- Ridhima Pandit as Priya
- Rucha Vaidya as Mary
- Swapnil Joshi as Aburao (God)
- Bhau Kadam as Baburao (God's Assistant)
- Prasad Barve as Vinay
- Avinash Narkar as Mr. Mhapuskar
- Rajesh Mapuskar
- Mohitt Anand
- Ramakant Dayama
- Gautami Patil as Special appearance in the song “Disla Ga Bai Disla”

== Soundtrack ==
=== Track listing ===
Premachi Goshta 2
No.	Title	Lyrics	Music	Singer(s)	Length
1.	"Olya Sanjveli 2.0"	Ashwini Shende	Avinash–Vishwajeet	Bela Shende, Kaavir	4:42
2.	"Ye Na Punha"	Vishwajeet Joshi	Avinash–Vishwajeet	Rohit Raut	3:13
3.	"Disla Ga Bai Disla 2.0"	Jagdish Khebudkar, Vishwajeet Joshi	Ram Kadam, Avinash–Vishwajeet	Radha Khude, Adarsh Shinde, Vishwajeet Joshi	3:45

== Release ==
The film was released on 21 October 2025 in theatres.

== Reception ==
Reshma Raikwar of Loksatta wrote "Rajwade blends emotions well, but the miracle-based plot makes the love story feel less realistic."

Santosh Bhingarde of Sakal rated 4 stars out of 5 stars and stated Rajwade deliver a unique, lively, and refreshing story. He noted a few disturbing elements, the film's warm friendship, love, and emotions stand out.
