= Ye Re Ye Re Paisa 2 =

2019 Indian Marathi-language film

- Theatrical release poster
- Directed by: Hemant Dhome
- Story by: Hrishikesh Koli
- Produced by: Om Prakash Bhatt; Swati Khopkar; Kumar Mangat Pathak; Sujay Shankarwar
- Starring: Sanjay Narvekar; Anand Ingle; Prasad Oak
- Cinematography: Sanjay K. Memane
- Edited by: Faisal – Imran
- Music by: Troy – Arif
- Production companies: Ameya Vinod Khopkar Entertainment; Panorama Studios; Trance VFX Studios Pvt Ltd; Purple Bull Entertainment
- Distributed by: AVK Entertainment & Distribution and Panorama Studios
- Release date: 9 August 2019
- Country: India
- Language: Marathi

Ye Re Ye Re Paisa 2 (lit. 'Let money come 2') is a 2019 Indian Marathi language comedy drama film directed by Hemant Dhome and produced by Ameya Vinod Khopkar, Purple Bull Entertainment, Trance VFX Studios Pvt Ltd and Panorama Studios. The film stars an ensemble cast of Sanjay Narvekar, Anand Ingle, Pushkar Shrotri, Mrinal Kulkarni, Aniket Vishwasrao, Mrinmayee Godbole, Prasad Oak and Smita Gondkar. It was released on 9 August 2019. The movie is the sequel of 2018 film Ye Re Ye Re Paisa.

== Cast ==
- Sanjay Narvekar as Anna
- Aniket Vishwasrao as Harsh Patil
- Mrinmayee Godbole as Sara Desai
- Pushkar Shotri as Niraj Shah
- Anand Ingle as Pradumna/Tenya
- Mrinal Kulkarni as Janhavi Muzumdar
- Prasad Oak as Inspector Sharad Shinde
- Priyadarshan Jadhav as Jango
- Rohit KaduDeshmukh as Diamond merchant
- Smita Gondkar as Kavya
- Mahesh Manjrekar as JK
- Vishakha Subhedar as Ranjana

== Release ==
It was theatrically released on 9 August 2019. The threequel, Ye Re Ye Re Paisa 3, was theatrically released on 18 July 2025.

== Soundtrack ==
Ye Re Ye Re Paisa 2

Soundtrack album by Troy – Arif
- Released: 31 July 2019
- Recorded: 2019
- Studio: Soundideaz Studio and Headroom Studio
- Genre: Feature film soundtrack
- Language: Marathi
- Label: Video Palace
- Producer: Joel Crasto
External audio
- Audio Jukebox on YouTube

The soundtrack of the film is composed by Troy - Arif and lyrics are written by Kshitij Patwardhan. The chorus in song "Un Dos Tres" are by Vivek Naik, Rahul Chitnis, Suchitra Dalvi and Sonal Naik, and Spanish vocals are by Murishka D’cruz and Arif Syed. The song "Ashwini Ye Na" originally sung by Kishore Kumar and Anuradha Paudwal composed by Arun Paudwal on lyrics of Shantaran Nandgaonkar from 1987 film Gammat Jammat under label of T-Series has been recreated.

Track listing
No.	Title	Lyrics	Music	Singer(s)	Length
1.	"Un Dos Tres"	Kshitij Patwardhan	Troy - Arif	Shalmali Kholgade	3:10
2.	"Paisa Paisa Ye Re Ye Re Paisa"	Kshitij Patwardhan	Troy - Arif	Mika Singh	2:41
3.	"Ashwini Ye Na" (recreated)	Shantaram Nandgaonkar	Troy - Arif	Avadhoot Gupte and Mugdha Karhade	3:10

== Critical reception ==
Mihir Bhanage of The Times of India wrote "There are loopholes in the story and a lot of cinematic liberty is taken. However, that’s in sync with other films in the genre. If you are looking for meaningful cinema, better avoid this one."
