= Fussclass Dabhade =

2025 film by Hemant Dhome

- Theatrical release poster
- Directed by: Hemant Dhome
- Written by: Hemant Dhome
- Produced by: Bhushan Kumar; Krishan Kumar; Aanand L. Rai; Kshitee Jog
- Starring: Amey Wagh; Siddharth Chandekar; Kshitee Jog
- Cinematography: Satyajeet Shobha Shriram
- Edited by: Faisal Mahadik
- Music by: Amitraj; Aditya Bedekar
- Production companies: T-Series; Colour Yellow Productions; Chalchitra Mandalee
- Release date: 24 January 2025
- Country: India
- Language: Marathi
- Box office: ₹9.64 crore

Fussclass Dabhade is a 2025 Indian Marathi-language family-drama film written and directed by Hemant Dhome Produced by Bhushan Kumar, Krishan Kumar, Aanand L. Rai and Kshitee Jog under the banners of T-Series, Colour Yellow Productions and Chalchitra Mandalee, the film stars Amey Wagh, Siddharth Chandekar and Kshitee Jog in lead roles, alongside a supporting cast that includes Nivedita Saraf, Harish Dudhade, Usha Nadkarni, and Rajan Bhise. The story follows three siblings, exploring their humorous and emotional bond.

The film was officially announced on 5 September 2024.

== Plot ==
The Dabhade family gathers for Prashant’s (Amey Wagh) wedding with Komal (Rajasi Bhave). Like many family occasions, long-buried conflicts resurface, creating tension, drama, and emotional outbursts.

Elder sister Jayashree (Kshitee Jog) arrives with her husband, Sachin (Harish Dudhade). She is deeply frustrated, struggling with infertility and the failure of her first IVF attempt. Younger brother Kiran (Siddharth Chandekar) returns home after two years. His heartbreak lingers from a failed romance with his cousin Madhuri (Mitali Mayekar), a marriage that never happened due to Jayashree’s opposition. Kiran, however, blames his father, Sadanand (Rajan Bhise), for the break-up.

As the wedding festivities proceed, tensions bubble beneath the surface. Prashant privately struggles with intimacy issues involving protection during sex with Komal. Meanwhile, Kiran unexpectedly meets Madhuri and her husband, Vaibhav (Suyog Gorhe). Though Madhuri is happily married, her candid advice helps Kiran to heal and move forward.

Gradually, reconciliation takes place within the family. Jayashree finds peace, Prashant understands and overcomes his hesitation, and Kiran lets go of his resentment. By the end, the siblings resolve their conflicts, restoring harmony in the Dabhade household.

== Cast ==
- Amey Wagh as Prashant Dabhade (Sonu)
- Siddharth Chandekar as Kiran Dabhade (Pappu)
- Kshitee Jog as Jayashree (Taidi)
- Nivedita Saraf as Sulochana Dabhade
- Harish Dudhade as Sachin
- Usha Nadkarni as Shanta Akka
- Rajasi Bhave as Komal (Komu)
- Rajan Bhise as Sadanand Dabhade
- Mitali Mayekar as Madhuri
- Suyog Gorhe as Vaibhav
- Trupti Shedge as Manju
- Kalabai Nakti as Mothi Aai

== Soundtrack ==
Track listing
| No. | Title | Lyrics | Music | Singer(s) | Length |
|---|---|---|---|---|---|
| 1. | "Yellow Yellow" | Kshitij Patwardhan | Amitraj | Nakash Aziz | 4:10 |
| 2. | "Dis Sarale" | Kshitij Patwardhan | Amitraj | Harshavardhan Wavare, Aanandi Joshi | 3:25 |
| 3. | "Manala Lighting" | Kshitij Patwardhan | Amitraj | Amitraj | 3:15 |
| 4. | "Tod Sakhli" | Kshitij Patwardhan | Amitraj | Shahir Ramanand Ugale |
| Total length: | | | | | 10:50 |

== Release ==
In September 2024, the film was announced with a poster featuring the three lead actors, along with its release date set for 15 November 2024. However, during Diwali 2024, the makers unveiled a new poster featuring the extended cast and announced that the release had been postponed to 24 January 2025.

== Reception ==
Fussclass Dabhade received mixed to positive reviews from critics, with praise for its performances and emotional depth but criticism for its pacing and narrative coherence. Nandini Ramnath of Scroll.in described the film as a "bittersweet saga" about three siblings, appreciating the performances of Amey Wagh, Siddharth Chandekar, and Kshitee Jog, but noted that the film struggles to balance its comedic and dramatic elements. Devendra Jadhav, writing for Lokmat, lauded the film’s heartfelt portrayal of sibling dynamics and Hemant Dhome’s direction, though he pointed out that the screenplay occasionally feels overstretched. Kalpesh Kubal of The Times of India gave the film a 3.5/5 rating, commending the chemistry among the leads and the film’s emotional resonance, but criticized its uneven pacing. Santosh Bhigarde of Sakal highlighted the film’s relatable themes and strong ensemble cast, but felt that the narrative could have been tighter to maintain audience engagement.
