= Super Duperr =

2026 Indian Marathi-language film

- Theatrical release poster
- Directed by: Sameer Asha Patil
- Written by: Sameer Asha Patil
- Produced by: Vijay Shinde; Naresh Borde; Umesh Kumar Bansal; Bavesh R. Janavlekar
- Starring: Lalit Prabhakar; Vidula Chougule; Nirmiti Sawant; Kushal Badrike; Namrata Sambherao; Hrishikesh Joshi; Shashank Shende
- Cinematography: Sanjay Jadhav
- Edited by: Abhijeet Deshpande
- Music by: Abhinay Jagtap; Kunal Karan
- Production companies: 99 Productions; Siddhivinayak Productions
- Distributed by: Zee Studios
- Release date: 3 April 2026
- Running time: 133 minutes
- Country: India
- Language: Marathi
- Box office: ₹3.85 crore

Super Duperr is a 2026 Indian Marathi-language comedy-drama film written and directed by Sameer Asha Patil. It was produced by Vijay Shinde and Naresh Borde under the banners of 99 Productions and Siddhivinayak Productions, in association with Zee Studios. The film stars Lalit Prabhakar, Vidula Chougule, Nirmiti Sawant, Shashank Shende, Kushal Badrike, Namrata Sambherao and Hrishikesh Joshi. It was theatrically released on 3 April 2026 and received a positive response from critics and audiences, particularly for its subject, direction, and performances.

== Plot ==
Rohit and his girlfriend Isha are aspiring professionals in the film industry living together in Mumbai. After purchasing a flat through a broker, Babubhai, they discover that the same property has been sold to the Jadhav family, a large, traditional household that has recently migrated from a village to the city. A court order mandates that both parties share the flat until a legal verdict is reached. Forced into uneasy cohabitation, the modern couple and the conservative joint family must navigate generational differences, cultural clashes, and conflicting lifestyles, all of which lead to a series of comedic and emotional situations.

== Cast ==
- Lalit Prabhakar as Rohit
- Vidula Chougule as Isha
- Shashank Shende as Namdev Jadhav
- Nirmiti Sawant as Laxmi, Namdev's wife
- Hrishikesh Joshi as Balasaheb, the Jadhavs' elder son
- Kushal Badrike as Kailash, the Jadhavs' younger son
- Namrata Sambherao as Suman, Balasaheb's wife
- Pratiksha Kote as Rupali, Kailash's wife
- Jagruti Datir as Shubhangi, the Jadhavs' daughter
- Kanchan Pagare as Babubhai, the property agent
- Umesh Jagtap as police inspector
- Abir Surve as Prince, Balasaheb's and Suman's son
- Meera Deshmukh as Kaau, Balasaheb's and Suman's daughter
- Sunil Deo as Balasaheb’s maternal uncle
- Rohini Hattangadi as Judge
- Vanita Kharat as Sona

== Production ==
Nirmiti Sawant, who portrayed a village woman in the film, sought assistance from actor Makarand Anaspure to perfect the language and accent, as he comes from a similar rural background and setting.

== Music ==
Super Duperr

Soundtrack album by Abhinay Jagtap and Kunal-Karan
- Released: 7 April 2026
- Genre: Feature film soundtrack
- Length: 17:08
- Language: Marathi
- Label: Zee Music Company

The film's music was composed by Abhinay Jagtap, while the song Angai was composed and written by the duo Kunal-Karan, with the remaining lyrics penned by Sameer Asha Patil. The background score was composed by Abhinay Jagtap. The music rights were acquired by Zee Music Company. The Ahirani-language song Kukdu Ku was sung by Anshuman More, a Class 8 student from Jalgaon district. He was selected after an audition conducted across Maharashtra.

Tracklisting
No.	Title	Singer(s)	Length
1.	"Nacha Danana"	Adarsh Shinde, Aanandi Joshi	4:10
2.	"Sutta Roll"	Rohit Raut, Juilee Joglekar, Abhinay Jagtap	3:38
3.	"Kukdu Ku"	Anshuman More, Abhinay Jagtap	4:08
4.	"Angai"	Swanand Kirkire	5:12
Total length:			17:08

== Release and reception ==
The teaser of Super Duperr was released in February 2026. The film was theatrically released on 3 April 2026, while its trailer had been unveiled earlier on 18 March 2026. The film had a grand premiere at Bharat Mata Cinema Hall in Parel, which reopened after a gap of six years. The event was attended by Ashish Shelar, Minister of Cultural Affairs of Maharashtra, Joint Managing Director of Film City Corporation Prashant Sajanikar, Chief Business Officer of Zee Studios Umesh Kumar Bansal, Business Head of Zee Studios Marathi Bavesh Janwalekar, along with the film’s producers and other dignitaries. It was distributed by Zee Studios and received a UA certificate from the Central Board of Film Certification.

=== Critical response ===
Super Duperr opened to generally positive responses from audiences, particularly family viewers.

Kalpeshraj Kubal of Maharashtra Times awarded the film 3.5 out of 5 stars and wrote, “It conveys big meaning through small incidents. It makes you laugh, engages you and makes you realize the value of relationships.” Critic Aparna Kad of Mumbai Tarun Bharat described it as an “entertainment package” and wrote, “The film not only contains humor, but also attempts to effectively handle emotional and social aspects,” giving it 3 out of 5 stars. Santosh Bhingarde of Sakal gave the film 4 out of 5 stars, praising how “the conflict between a modern couple and a family that preserves old traditions, their jealousy, differences in ideas, and the sweetness of the relationship that slowly blossoms between them is beautifully captured.” Anup George of The Times of India gave the film 3 out of 5 stars, calling it “a wild ride filled with laughter and emotion,” and wrote, “While it could have benefitted from adding more inter-family interactions.” Ashish Ningunkar of My Mahanagar also awarded 4 stars and wrote, “Overall, everyone's work is so beautiful that the movie does not feel boring.”

However, Sameer Ahire of Movie Talkies offered a more mixed review, writing, “There is nothing particularly ‘super’ about it—except perhaps how supremely silly it appears at its core. The heart is there, but the body is missing,” while rating the film 2.5 out of 5 stars. Keyur Seta of The Common Man Speaks gave the film 2.5 out of 5 stars and described it as “a decent entertainer on the conflict between modernism and traditionalism, which could have been better.”

== See also ==
- List of Marathi films of 2026
