= Krantijyoti Vidyalay Marathi Madhyam =

2026 Indian film by Hemant Dhome

- Theatrical release poster
- Marathi: क्रांतिज्योती विद्यालय मराठी माध्यम
- Directed by: Hemant Dhome
- Written by: Hemant Dhome
- Story by: Hemant Dhome
- Produced by: Kshitee Jog; Viraj Gawas; Urfi Kazmi; Ajinkya Dhamal
- Starring: Sachin Khedekar; Amey Wagh; Siddharth Chandekar; Prajakta Koli; Kshitee Jog; Kadambari Kadam; Harish Dudhade
- Cinematography: Satyajeet Shobha Shriram
- Edited by: Bhavesh Todankar
- Music by: Harsh-Vijay; Background score: Aditya Bedekar
- Production companies: Crazy Few Films; Chalchitra Mandalee
- Distributed by: Chalchitra Mandalee; Sunshine Studios
- Release date: 1 January 2026
- Running time: 149 minutes
- Country: India
- Language: Marathi
- Budget: ₹4–6 crore
- Box office: ₹32 crore

Krantijyoti Vidyalay Marathi Madhyam (transl. Krantijyoti Vidyalaya, Marathi Medium School) is a 2026 Indian Marathi-language social drama film written and directed by Hemant Dhome. The film stars an ensemble cast of Sachin Khedekar, Amey Wagh, Siddharth Chandekar, Prajakta Koli (Marathi debut), Kshitee Jog, Harish Dudhade and Kadambari Kadam in pivotal roles. The film highlights the significance of Marathi medium and depicts the challenges faced by Marathi schools in contemporary society.

The film was theatrically released on 1 January 2026 and opened to positive reviews. It was huge commercial success.

== Plot ==
The narrative focuses on a Marathi medium school facing closure due to declining student numbers and societal preference for English medium education. Former students and teachers reunite to save the institution, rediscovering their shared memories, camaraderie, and cultural values. The film weaves nostalgic moments with a broader commentary on preserving regional language education.

== Cast ==
- Sachin Khedekar as Dinkar Shirke, school principal
- Amey Wagh as Baban Mhatre
- Siddharth Chandekar as Kuldeep Nagavkar
- Prajakta Koli as Anjali Rane
- Kshitee Jog as Salma Hasina Aantule
- Kadambari Kadam as Suman Bhoir, Vishal's wife
- Harish Dudhade as Rakesh Gharat
- Pushkaraj Chirputkar as Vishal Bhoir, Suman's husband
- Nirmiti Sawant as Mrs. Narvekar
  - Sayali Sanjeev as Young Ms. Narvekar
- Dhananjay Sardeshpande as Balu Mama
- Anant Jog as Mr. Jagtap
- Jitendra Joshi as Vishvajeet Deshmukh, Education minister
- Chinmayee Sumeet as Mrs. Rane, Anjali's mother
- Uday Sabnis as Patties Kaka
- Rajendra Shisatkar as Old education minister
- Sairaj Kendre as Prince Mhatre, Baban's son

== Production ==
The film was announced on 1 May 2025 by director Hemant Dhome. During promotion, Prajakta Koli described her role in the film as a "coming home" experience, marking her debut in Marathi cinema.

The principal photography commenced in Raigad district. The film shot across Konkan division and wrapped up filming in the mid September 2025 in Alibag.

== Release ==
=== Theatrical ===
The official teaser and trailer were released in late 2025, and the film was theatrically released on 1 January 2026.

=== Home media ===
The film was digitally released on 27 February 2026 on ZEE5.

== Reception ==
=== Critical reception ===
Aavishkar Gawande, a popular film critic and journalist gave 4 out of 5 stars and tweeted that film is heartwarming, fun and deeply nostalgic, just like our school memories. Kalpeshraj Kubal of Maharashtra Times gave 3.5 out of 5 stars and noted that the film effectively highlights the importance of Marathi medium education while evoking nostalgia associated with school life. The review appreciated the film's emotional narrative and performances, while also observing that its treatment remains rooted in social realism rather than melodrama.

Nandini Ramnath of Scroll.in wrote "The 149-minute movie takes too long to spell out its intent and then keeps wandering off after it has done so. The lack of tight, focused and coherent writing render an enjoyable film about a bunch of affable characters into a slog."

Shreyas Pande of The Hindu wrote "The plot often feels like two films, where the thread about the reunion of friends doesn’t quite merge with the social drama that it also aims to be. The co-existence is jarring, as some of these exchanges end up becoming didactic without resolve. An extended discussion takes place early on between the bunch about the practicality of having Marathi schools and the directness in the dialogues lessens the charm." He further adds that "the intensity of the music takes the film to an almost epic-like quality."

Payal Naik of Sakal writes that the film addresses the important issue of preserving the mother tongue and connects with the audience through its story, dialogues, and performances. The pace is good but the story feels slightly stretched at times. Sachin Khedekar stands out in his performance.

Anupama Gunde of Pudhari News awarded 4/5 stars and praised the film for "presenting sensitive topic in a nuanced way" and observed that the film feels very slow-paced, especially in the first half."

=== Box office ===
The film grossed ₹78.43 lakh on its opening day. During its first weekend, the film experienced significant growth and grossed over ₹3.91 crore. The six-day collection stood at ₹4.96 crore, rising to ₹6.14 crore by the end of its first week.

By the eleventh day, the film had collected ₹11.40 crore. Its second-week earnings reached ₹14.90 crore, while the net collection stood at approximately ₹16.95 crore, with a domestic gross of around ₹18.25 crore by the eighteenth day. In its third week, the film crossed ₹23 crore, and by the end of its fourth weekend, the total collection reached approximately ₹25 crore.

Krantijyoti Vidyalay Marathi Madhyam delivered returns of nearly 500 per cent within four weeks and crossed 600 percent returns by 50 days. The film concluded its theatrical run with ₹27.35 crore in India net collections and around ₹32 crore gross worldwide. Made on a budget of ₹4 crore, the film achieved 583.75 per cent ROI, making it the years most profitable Marathi film at the time.

== Sequel ==
The sequel was announced by the makers at the honours ceremony on 5 February 2026.
