= Toh Ti Ani Fuji =

2026 Indian Marathi-language romantic drama film

- Directed by: Mohit Takalkar
- Written by: Irawati Karnik
- Produced by: Shiladitya Bora
- Starring: Lalit Prabhakar; Mrinmayee Godbole
- Cinematography: Rahul Chauhan; John Donica
- Edited by: Mohit Takalkar
- Music by: Hrishikesh Datar; Jasraj Jayant Joshi; Background score: Saurabh Bhalerao
- Production company: Platoon One Films
- Release date: 10 April 2026
- Country: India
- Language: Marathi

Toh, Ti Ani Fuji (lit. Him, Her and Fuji) is a 2026 Indian Marathi-language romantic drama film directed by Mohit Takalkar and written by Irawati Karnik. The film is produced by Shiladitya Bora under the banner of Platoon One Films and stars Lalit Prabhakar and Mrinmayee Godbole in the lead roles.

The film had its world premiere at the 24th Pune International Film Festival (PIFF) in January 2026, where it competed in the Marathi Feature Film section. It released directly on Sony LIV on 10 April 2026.

== Plot ==
Set in contemporary Pune, the film follows a couple who become deeply involved in an intense romantic relationship. What begins as a passionate and urgent connection gradually unravels as conflicting priorities, contrasting personalities, and unmet expectations begin to strain their bond, ultimately leading to a painful separation.

Seven years later, the former lovers unexpectedly reunite near Mount Fuji in Japan. Having grown older and shaped by their separate journeys, they find themselves carrying different lives and emotional scars. Their reunion forces them to confront unresolved feelings and the memories of a relationship that continues to linger in their lives.

The narrative unfolds through a non-linear structure, interweaving flashbacks of their time together in Pune with their present-day encounter in Japan. As the story progresses, each timeline is gradually recontextualized, revealing the complexities of their relationship and exploring whether love can endure the weight of its own past.

== Cast ==
- Lalit Prabhakar as Toh
- Mrinmayee Godbole as Ti
- Omprakash Shinde
- Kabir Jueelee Deven
- Fubito Yamano
- Natsuko Fuji

== Release ==
=== Festival premiere ===
Toh, Ti Ani Fuji had its world premiere at the 24th Pune International Film Festival (PIFF), held from 15 to 22 January 2026 in Pune, Maharashtra. The film was screened as part of the Marathi Feature Film competition section.

=== OTT release ===
The worldwide streaming rights for the film were acquired by Sony Pictures Networks India and it was released exclusively on Sony LIV on 10 April 2026. The film is also available under the Hindi title Main, Woh Aur Fuji.

== Reception ==
=== Critical response ===
Toh Ti Ani Fuji received generally positive reviews from critics, with praise directed towards its performances, cinematography, and its portrayal of a complex and toxic romantic relationship.

Writing for Outlook India, Sakshi Salil Chavan rated the film 4 out of 5 stars and described it as “a radiantly choreographed dance between codependency and incompatibility”, praising its nuanced depiction of a volatile relationship and its refusal to judge either character. Nandini Ramnath of Scroll.in described the film as “the kind of grown-up, intimate and sexually frank drama that's rarely available in Marathi cinema”, while commending the lead performances. Rahul Desai of The Hollywood Reporter India noted that the film “resists the conventional relationship between love and storytelling”, highlighting its exploration of emotional contradictions and realism within romantic narratives.
