= Suchitra Bandekar =

Indian actress and producer

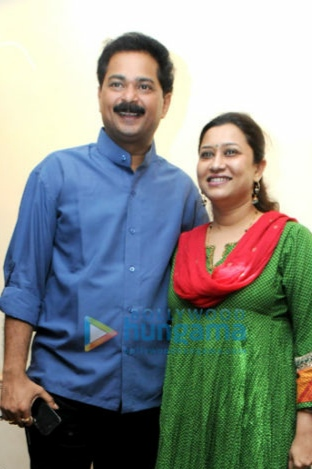
- Bandekar with husband Aadesh Bandekar in 2013
- Born: Suchitra Gudekar; 10 October 1972 (age 53); Nashik, Maharashtra
- Occupations: Actress; Producer
- Years active: 1994–present
- Spouse: Aadesh Bandekar (m. 1990)
- Children: Soham Bandekar
- Family: Bandekar family

Suchitra Bandekar is an Indian actress. She mainly works in Hindi and Marathi films and Television.

== Early life and education ==
She was born and brought up in Mumbai, Maharashtra. She attended school in Balmohan Vidya Mandir and college in D. G. Ruparel College of Arts, Science and Commerce, Dadar.

== Personal life ==
Suchitra got married with her long time boyfriend Aadesh Bandekar in 1990. She has a son, named Soham Bandekar.

== Filmography ==
Year	Title	Role	Ref.
1990	Paradeshi Chadhei	Mona Choudhury, Mr.Choudhury (Sr.)'s great grand daughter, Gagan Chodhury's daughter	Odia film
1994	Jazbaat	Jagdish's Employee	
2008	Full 3 Dhamaal	Saudamini Pradhan	
2008	Shirdi Saibaba		
2009	Mi Shivajiraje Bhosale Boltoy!	Sumitra Bhosale	
2011	Mala Aai Vhhaychy!	Deshpande Madam	
2011	Singham	Savita Bhosale	
2014	Amrutham Chandmamalo	Santha	
2014	Ishq Wala Love		
2014	Rama Madhav		
2018	Ranangan	Kalandi	
2018	Simmba	Mrs. Mohile	
2021	Jhimma	Vaishali	
2023	Baipan Bhari Deva	Pallavi	
2023	Jhimma 2	Vaishali	

== Television ==
=== Actor ===
Year	Title	Role	Notes
1994-1995	Tehkikaat	Episodic role	
1997	Byomkesh Bakshi	Deepa	credited as Suchitra Gudekar
1995-1999	Hum Paanch	Babli	
1999-2001	Don't Worry Ho Jayega	Manju	
2002-2005	Avantika	Urmila	
2002	Raat		
2006-2007	Ghar Ki Lakshmi Betiyann	Phulki Garodia	
2007-2009	Vahinisaheb	Yamini (Akkasaheb)	
2010	Do Hanson Ka Jodaa		
2011-2012	Aabhas Ha	Arjun's mother	
2011	Don Kinare Doghi Aapan	Sadhana	
2012–2013	Mujhse Kuchh Kehti...Yeh Khamoshiyaan	Sumitra Bhosle	
2012-2014	Pyaar Ka Dard Hai Meetha Meetha Pyaara Pyaara	Manorama Manik Deewan (Chachi ji)	
2014-2015	Mere Rang Mein Rangne Waali	Ishaani Chaturvedi	
2025	Manpasand Ki Shaadi	Sharda Shinde	

=== Producer ===
- Lakshya on Star Pravah
- Nanda Saukhya Bhare on Zee Marathi
- Tharala Tar Mag! on Star Pravah
- Lalit 205 on Star Pravah
- Almost Sufal Sampurna on Zee Yuva
- Nave Lakshya on Star Pravah
- Shabbas Sunbai on Sun Marathi
