= Kshitee Jog =

Indian television actress (born 1983)

- क्षिती जोग
- Born: 1 January 1983 (age 43); Mumbai, Maharashtra, India
- Occupation: Actress
- Years active: 2001–present
- Spouse: Hemant Dhome (m. 2012)
- Family: Jog family

Kshitee Jog (born 1 January 1983) is an Indian actress who mainly works in Hindi television along with Hindi and Marathi film productions. She is best known for her role as Saraswati, one of the main characters in the Zee TV daily soap Ghar Ki Lakshmi Betiyann. Besides, she is known for the portrayal of Dr. Devyani Singhania (Naitik's step-mother and Naira's step-grandmother), for 7 years in the longest-running soap Yeh Rishta Kya Kehlata Hai

She played a role in Sony TV's Maan Rahe Tera Pitaah. She was also part of comedy sitcom Sarabhai vs Sarabhai until replaced by Shital Thakkar.

She also acted in TV series Navya which ended on 29 June 2012.

== Family ==
She is the daughter of Marathi actor Anant Jog and Marathi actress Ujjwala Jog. She married Marathi actor-director Hemant Dhome in 2012.

== Filmography ==
=== Films ===
Year	Title	Role	Ref.
2005	Saha September		
2013	Sanshay Kallol	Chaitra	
2013	Mai	Mai's Daughter	
2015	Timepass 2	Chanda	
2018	Home Sweet Home		
2019	Anandi Gopal	Anandi's Mother	
2019	Hirkani		
2020	Choricha Mamla	Anjali	
2020	Mismatched	Simple Ahuja	
2021	Jhimma	Meeta Jahagirdar	
2021	Rashmi Rocket	Dr. Jagdish Mahatre	
2022	Pawankhind	Badi Begum	
2023	Rocky Aur Rani Kii Prem Kahaani	Poonam Randhawa	
2023	Jhimma 2	Meeta Jahagirdar	
2025	Fussclass Dabhade	Taidi	
2026	Krantijyoti Vidyalay Marathi Madhyam	Salma Hasina Aantule	
2026	Tu Yaa Main	Mrs. Kadam	
2026	Daayra	Parvati Pujari	

== Television ==
Year	Serial	Role	Notes
2001-2005	Shriyut Gangadhar Tipre	Nikita	
2004-2006	Sarabhai vs Sarabhai	Sonya Painter née Sarabhai	
2006-2009	Ghar Ki Lakshmi Betiyann	Saraswati Garodia / Gandhi	Lead role
2004-2007	Vadalvaat	Alandi Chatre	
2010	Aapki Antara	Antara's stepmother, Vidya (elder)	
2010	Damini	Police	
2010	Maan Rahe Tera Pitaah	Kaliprasad's wife; Madhav's mother	
2011-2012	Navya	Neeta Mishra; Navya's Mother	
2012	Tu Tithe Me	Advocate	
2013	Gandh Phulancha Gela Sangun	Durga Aai	Best Actress
2010-2013	Fu Bai Fu	Contestant	
2014–2021	Yeh Rishta Kya Kehlata Hai	Dr. Devyani Singhania	won the award for Best Mother
2019	Yeh Rishtey Hain Pyaar Ke	Dr. Devyani Singhania	
2019-2020	H.M. Bane T.M. Bane	Meghna Sawant	
2020-2022	Mismatched	Dimple's Mother	Netflix Series
2021	Bigg Boss Marathi season 3	Herself	Guest appearance
2023	Baatein Kuch Ankahee Si	Sumitra Karmarkar	
2025	Tharala Tar Mag!	Advocate Damini Deshmukh	
2025	Baai Tujhyapayi	Laxmi	Lead role

== See also ==
- Chalchitra Mandalee
