= Mrinmayee Godbole =

Indian film actress

- Born: 6 February; Pune, Maharashtra, India
- Occupation: Actress
- Years active: 2011–present
- Spouse: Nikhil Mahajan (m. 2017)
- Father: Shrirang Godbole

Mrinmayee Godbole is an Indian actress who appears in Marathi movies. She is most appreciated for her role in the Marathi film Chi Va Chi Sau Ka directed by Paresh Mokashi. She has received the prestigious Maharashtra State Film Award for Best Actress for film GodaKaath at 58th Maharashtra State Film Awards.

== Career ==
Godbole started her career with the Marathi movie Rajwade and Sons. She later played roles in other movies like Chintoo and Chi Va Chi Sau Ka. She played the lead actress in the latter film, of a vegan veterinarian for which she learned kung fu she also Nominated for Zee Chitra Gaurav Puraskar for Best Actress.

== Filmography ==
Year	Title	Role	Language	Notes	Ref
2011	Teecha Baap Tyacha Baap	Monica Deshmukh	Marathi		
2012	Chintoo	Chimanee	Marathi		
2013	Pradosh	Latika	Marathi	Short film	
2015	Rajwade and Sons	Ananya Vaibhav Joshi	Marathi		
2015	Baji	Herself	Marathi	In the song "Aala Re Aala Baji"	
2016	Vees Mhanje Vees	Shailaja Vaidya	Marathi		
2016	CRD	Persis	Hindi & English	Lead role	
2017	Chi Va Chi Sau Ka	Savitri/Savi	Marathi	Lead role	
2018	Pad Man	Sonali Chauhan	Hindi	Supporting role	
2019	Ye Re Ye Re Paisa 2	Sara Desai	Marathi	Parallel lead	
2019	Kanyadaan	Jyoti Athavle	Marathi		
2019	Smile Please	Herself	Marathi	In the song "Chal Pudhe"	
2021	Awwanchit	Aashima	Marathi		
2021	Jhimma	Rama Lele-Shah	Marathi		
2021	June	Herself	Marathi	Special appearance	
2022	Aye Zindagi	Manjula Nair	Hindi		
2022	Vishu	Arvi	Marathi		
2022	Dear Molly	Anita	Hindi		
2023	GodaKaath	Preeti	Marathi	Won Maharashtra State Film Award for Best Actress	
2023	Toh Ti Ani Fuji	Ti	Marathi		
2023	Animal	Dr. Amrita	Hindi	Cameo appearance	
2026	Tighee	Young Hemlata Ranade	Marathi	Cameo appearance	

== Television ==
Year	Title	Platform	Role	Notes
2008-2010	Agnihotra	Star Pravah	Vaidehi Chintamani Agnihotri	Marathi TV Debut

== Web series ==
Year	Title	Platform	Role	Notes
2019	Once A Year	MX Player	Raavi	
2020	High	MX Player	Ashima Chauhan	
2021	Kaali Peeli Tales	Amazon Prime Video	Karuna	
2023	Farzi	Amazon Prime Video	Adv. Stuti Das	
2023	Shantit Kranti	SonyLIV	Nishi	
