= List of Marathi films of 2023 =

This is a list of Marathi (Indian Marathi-language) films that were released in 2023.

The Marathi film industry experienced a decline in box-office earnings, with total collections dropping to ₹201 crore in 2023 from ₹268 crore in the previous year.

== Box office collection ==
The highest-grossing Marathi films released in 2023, by worldwide box office gross revenue, are as follows.

*	Denotes films still running in cinemas worldwide

Highest worldwide gross of 2023
Rank	Title	Production company	Worldwide gross	Ref.
1	Baipan Bhari Deva	Jio Studios; EmVeeBee Media	₹92 crore (US$9.6 million)	
2	Subhedar	Mulakshar Productions; Raajwarasa Productions; Prithviraj Productions; Rajau Productions; Parampara Productions	₹18 crore (US$1.9 million)	
3	Jhimma 2	Chalchitra Mandalee; Jio Studios; Colour Yellow Productions; Crazy Few Films	₹14 crore (US$1.5 million)	
4	Aflatoon	Saha & Sons Studios; Ideas The Entertainment Company	₹10.01 crore (US$1.0 million)	
5	Ekda Yeun Tar Bagha	Ideas The Entertainment Company; Gold Mountain Pictures; SR Enterprises; Swarna Pat Katha	₹8 crore (US$830,000)	
6	Vaalvi	Zee Studios	₹7.25 crore (US$750,000)	
7	Ravrambha	Shashikant Pawar Productions; Devi Sateri Productions	₹6.25 crore (US$650,000)	
8	Maharashtra Shahir	Everest Entertainment; Kedar Shinde Productions	₹5.68 crore (US$590,000)	
9	Ghar Banduk Biryani	Zee Studios; Aatpat Production	₹5 crore (US$520,000)	
10	Raundal	Bhoomika Films and Entertainment; Rise Entertainment	₹5 crore (US$520,000)	

== Box office records ==
- Baipan Bhaari Deva set several records for a Marathi film.
  - It became the first female-centric Marathi movie to reach the ₹92 crore (US$9.6 million) mark at the box office.
  - It set the record for the highest one day collection for a Marathi film, grossing ₹6.10 crore (US$630,000), earlier this record was held by Ved, which earned 5.70 crores in a single day.

== January – March ==
Opening		Title	Director	Cast	Ref.
J A N	6	Surya	Hasnain Hyderabadwala	Prasad Mangesh; Akhilendra Mishra; Hemant Birje; Ruchita Jadhav; Uday Tikekar; Pradeep Patwardhan; Arun Nalawade	
J A N	6	Tiffin Time	Mhalsakant Kausadikar	Suhani Chavan; Pradnya Phadtare	
J A N	13	Saath Sobat	Ramesh More	Sangram Samel; Mohan Joshi; Mrunal Kulkarni; Anil Gawas	
J A N	13	Victoria - Ek Rahasya	Virajas Kulkarni	Sonalee Kulkarni; Pushkar Jog; Akshay Kulkarni; Heera Sohal; Mikaila Telford	
J A N	13	Vaalvi	Paresh Mokashi	Swapnil Joshi; Subodh Bhave; Anita Date-Kelkar; Shivani Surve	
J A N	20	Sarla Ek Koti	Nitin Vijay Supekar	Onkar Bhojane; Isha Keskar; Chhaya Kadam; Kamlakar Satpute; Ramesh Pardeshi; Suresh Vishwakarma	
J A N	26	Bamboo	Vishal Devrukhkar	Abhinay Berde; Vaishnavi Kalyankar; Parth Bhalerao; Shivaji Satam	
J A N	26	Piccolo	Abhijeet Mohan Warang	Pranav Raorane; Ashwini Kasar; Kishore Choughule; Abhay Khapadkar; Namita Gaonkar; Vivek Walake	
J A N	27	Tuch Maza Kalij	Balasaheb Rathod	Usman Nadab; Rahul Chaure; Pawan Maske; Amol Maske; Priyanka Bhalerao	
F E B	3	Gadad Andhar	Pradnyesh Kadam	Neha Mahajan; Jay Dudhane; Shubhangi Tambale; Akash Kumbhar; Aarti Shinde; Chetan Mule; Astha Thombare	
F E B	10	Jaggu Ani Juliet	Mahesh Limaye	Amey Wagh; Vaidehi Parshurami; Manoj Joshi; Pravin Tarde; Avinash Narkar; Sameer Dharmadhikari; Upendra Limaye; Sameer Choughule	
F E B	10	Dhishkyaoon	Pritam SK Patil	Prathamesh Parab; Sandeep Pathak; Megha Shinde	
F E B	10	Alay Mazya Rashila	Rajkumar Santoshi	Chinmay Mandlekar; Alka Kubal; Mohan Joshi; Nirmiti Sawant	
F E B	17	Tarri	Mahesh Kale	Lalit Prabhakar; Gauri Nalwade; Yogesh Dimbale; Anil Nagarkar; Shashank Darne; Sneha Joshi; Rajesh Nanaware	
F E B	17	Ghoda	T Mahesh	Kailash Waghmare; Archana Mahadeo; Rahul Belapurkar; Vajra Pawar	
F E B	17	Ragil	Yogesh - Rakesh	Pranav Raorane; Premakiran Bhat; Shivani Kothale; Prashant Bodgire; Akshay Gavas; Sudarshan Bodke	
M A R	3	Raundal	Gajanan Nana Padol	Bhausaheb Shinde; Neha Sonwane	
M A R	3	Satarcha Salman	Hemant Dhome	Suyog Gorhe; Sayali Sanjeev; Shivani Surve; Akshay Tanksale; Makarand Deshpande	
M A R	17	I Prem U	Niteen Gokul Kaher	Abhijit Amkar; Kayadu Lohar; Sanjay Mone; Pratibha Bhagat; Aanand Sarjerao Wagh; Rushikesh Wanburkar; Samadhan Murtdak; Saishri Gursal	
M A R	22	Phulrani	Vishwas Joshi	Subodh Bhave; Priyadarshini Indalkar; Ashwini Kulkarni; Gaurav Ghatnekar; Vaishnavi Andhale; Milind Shinde; Vikram Gokhale	

== April – June ==
Opening		Title	Director	Cast	Ref.
A P R	7	Ghar Banduk Biryani	Hemant Awtade	Akash Thosar; Sayali Patil; Sayaji Shinde; Nagraj Manjule; Tanaji Galgunde; Somnath Awghade	
A P R	7	Circuitt	Aakash Pendharkar	Vaibhav Tatwawadi; Hruta Durgule; Ramesh Pardesi	
A P R	14	Sarja	Dhananjay Manohar Khandagale	Anil Nagarkar; Rohit Chavan; Tushar Nagargoje; Aishwarya Bhalerao	
A P R	14	School College Ani Life	Vivaan Suryawanshi	Tejasswi Prakash; Karan Parab; Jitendra Joshi	
A P R	14	Urmi	Rajesh Jadhav	Chinmay Udgirkar; Sayli Sanjeev; Nitish Chavan	
A P R	14	Jaitar	Ghanshyam Pawar	Sangram Salvi; Rajat Gawali; Sayali Patil; Arun Gite; Smita Prabhu; Gayatri Soham	
A P R	28	Maharashtra Shahir	Kedar Shinde	Ankush Chaudhari; Sana Shinde; Atul Kale; Mrunmayee Deshpande; Amit Dolawat; Nirmiti Sawant	
A P R	28	TDM	Bhaurao Karhade	Pruthviraj Thorat; Kalindi Nistane	
M A Y	5	Baloch	Prakash Pawar	Pravin Tarde; Ashok Samarth; Smita Gondkar; Tejashree Jadhav; Vishal Nikam	
M A Y	5	Sari	K. S. Ashoka	Ajinkya Raut; Ritika Shrotri; Pruthvi Ambaar; Mrinal Kulkarni	
M A Y	5	Tendlya	Sachin J Jadhav; Nachiket Waikar	Adwaita Jadhav; Sambhaji Tangde; Ankita Yadav; Vitthal Nagnath Kale; Ketan Visal; Firoz Shaikh	
M A Y	12	Marathi Paul Padate Pudhe	Swapnil Mayekar	Chirag Patil; Siddhi Patne; Anant Jog; Satish Pulekar; Satish Salagare; Sanjay Kulkarni	
M A Y	14	Autograph – Ek Japun Thevavi Ashi Lovestory	Satish Rajwade	Ankush Chaudhari; Amruta Khanvilkar; Urmila Kothare; Manasi Moghe	
M A Y	19	Chowk	Devendra Gaikwad	Kiran Gaikwad; Akshay Tanksale; Pravin Tarde; Upendra Limaye; Sanskruti Balgude	
M A Y	19	Raghuveer	Nilesh Arun Kunjir	Rujata Deshmukh; Vikram Gaikwad; Rahul Mehendale	
M A Y	19	Dil Bedhund	Santosh Funde	Hansraj Jagtap; Sakshi Chaudhary; Jayesh Chavan; Aarti Kuthe	
M A Y	26	Naad Ekach Fakt Bailgada Sharyat	Chetan Sagade	Adityaraje Marathe; Aishwarya Daund; Pooja Pardhe; Anil Nagarkar; Ajay Varpe	
M A Y	26	Get Together	Sachin Suresh Dhotre	Eknath Gite; Trishaa Kamlakar	
M A Y	26	Ravrambha	Anup Jagdale	Om Bhutkar; Monalisa Bagal; Ashok Samarth; Shantanu Moghe	
M A Y	26	Django JD	Hardeep Sachdev	Abhinav Sawant; Gauri Nalawade; Aditya Ambre	
J U N	2	Phakaat	Shreyash Jadhav	Hemant Dhome; Avinash Narkar; Suyog Gorhe	
J U N	2	Butterfly	Meera Welankar	Madhura Velankar; Abhijeet Satam; Pradeep Velankar; Mahesh Manjrekar	
J U N	9	Musandi	Shivaji Doltade	Rohan Patil; Gayatri Jadhav; Suresh Vishwakarma; Tanaji Galgunde	
J U N	9	Umbrella	Manoj Vishe	Hemal Ingle; Abhishek Sethiya; Arun Nalawade	
J U N	23	Vitthal Maza Sobati	Sandeep Naware	Sandeep Pathak; Arun Nalawade; Rajendra Shisatkar; Aashay Kulkarni	
J U N	23	Aadharwad	Suresh Zade	Rohit Hanchate; Samruddhi Shimge; Sayaji Shinde; Atul Parchure	
J U N	30	Baipan Bhaari Deva	Kedar Shinde	Rohini Hattangadi; Vandana Gupte; Sukanya Kulkarni; Shilpa Navalkar; Suchitra Bandekar; Deepa Parab	

== July – September ==
Opening		Film	Director	Cast	Ref(s)
J U L	7	Aathvani	Siddhant Sawant	Mohan Agashe; Suhas Joshi; Suhrud Wardekar; Vaishnavi Karmarkar	
J U L	8	Unaad	Aditya Sarpotdar	Ashutosh Gaikwad; Abhishek Bharte; Hemal Ingle; Chinmay Jadhav; Devika Daftardar	
J U L	14	Date Bhet	Lokesh Gupte	Santosh Juvekar; Sonalee Kulkarni; Hemant Dhome	
J U L	21	Aflatoon	Paritosh Painter	Siddharth Jadhav; Johnny Lever; Tejaswini Lonari; Shweta Gulati; Vijay Patkar; Paritosh Painter	
J U L	28	Aani Baani	Dinesh Jagtap	Upendra Limaye; Sayaji Shinde; Pravin Tarde; Sanjay Khapare; Veena Jamkar; Usha Naik	
A U G	4	Pahije Jatiche	Kabaddi Narendra Babu	Vikram Gajre; Sanjana Kale; Sayaji Shinde	
A U G	25	Subhedar	Digpal Lanjekar	Chinmay Mandlekar; Mrinal Kulkarni; Ajay Purkar	
S E P	1	Territory	Sachin Shriram	Kishor Kadam; Sandeep Kulkarni	
S E P	1	Baap Manus	Yogesh Phulphagar	Pushkar Jog; Anusha Dandekar; Kushal Badrike	
S E P	1	Baaplyok	Makarand Mane	Shashank Shende; Vitthal Kale; Payal Jadhav; Neeta Shende	
S E P	15	Khalga	Shivaji Doltade	Madhvi Juvekar; Kartik Doltade; Sultan Shikalgar; Roshni Kadam	
S E P	29	Teen Adkun Sitaram	Hrishikesh Joshi	Vaibhav Tatwawadi; Alok Rajwade; Prajakta Mali; Sankarshan Karhade	

== October – December ==
Opening		Title	Director	Cast	Ref.
O C T	6	Ankush	Nishant Dhapse	Deepraj; Ketaki Mategaonkar; Sayaji Shinde; Mangesh Desai; Chinmay Udgirkar; Shashank Shende; Rutuja Bagwe	
O C T	6	Aatmapamphlet	Ashish Avinash Bende	Om Bendkhale; Pranjali Srikanth Bhimrao Mudey; Ketaki Saraf	
O C T	6	Sasubai Jorat	Siddharth Dhage	Mohan Joshi; Vijay Patkar; Usha Naik; Sandeep Pathak; Asha Birajdar; Shivaji Shinde	
O C T	13	Daak	Mahesh Nene	Ashwini Kalsekar; Aniket Kelkar; Sanjeevani Jadhav; Vedangi Kulkarni; Guru Divekar	
O C T	13	Journey	Sachin Dabhade	Shantanu Moghe; Sharwari Gemenis; Shubham More	
O C T	13	Dil Dosti Deewangi	Shirish Rane	Smita Gondkar; Veena Jagtap; Chirag Patil; Vijay Patkar; Smita Jaykar; Vidyadhar Joshi	
O C T	20	Boyz 4	Vishal Devrukhkar	Parth Bhalerao; Ritika Shrotri; Girish Kulkarni; Abhinay Berde; Pratik Lad	
O C T	27	Gadkari	Anurag Rajan Bhusari	Rajul Chopda; Aishwarya Dorle; Abhilash Bhusari; Trupti Kalkar	
O C T	27	International Falamfok	Dhiraj Dilip Gurav	Tanaji Galgunde; Suresh Vishwakarma; Yogesh Khilare	
N O V	3	Single	Chetan Chavada; Sagar Pathak	Prathamesh Parab; Abhinay Berde; Prajakta Gaikwad; Rajeshwari Kharat	
N O V	3	Sshort And Ssweet	Ganesh Dinkar Kadam	Sonali Kulkarni; Harshad Atkari; Sridhar Watsar; Rasika Sunil	
N O V	3	Aatur	Shivaji Lotan Patil	Preeti Mallapurkar; Chinmay Udgirkar; Yogesh Soman; Pranav Raorane	
N O V	3	Rangile Funter	Nishant Dhapse	Hansraj Jagtap; Rupesh Bane; Yash Kulkarni; Jeevan Karhalkar; Milind Shinde; Kishore Chowghule; Sia Patil; Danny Adsul; Vaishali Dabhade; Arun Geete	
N O V	10	Naal 2	Sudhakar Reddy Yakkanti	Shrinivas Pokale; Nagraj Manjule; Jitendra Joshi; Devika Daftardar	
N O V	10	Shyamchi Aai	Sujay Dahake	Gauri Deshpande; Sharva Gadgil; Om Bhutkar; Sandeep Pathak	
N O V	17	Salman Society	Kailash Kashinath Pawar	Gaurav More; Vinayak Poddar; Shubham More; Pushkar Loankar; Vanita Kharat; Namrata Sambherao; Upendra Limaye	
N O V	24	Jhimma 2	Hemant Dhome	Suhas Joshi; Nirmiti Sawant; Kshitee Jog; Suchitra Bandekar; Siddharth Chandekar; Sayali Sanjeev; Shivani Surve; Rinku Rajguru	
D E C	8	Ekda Yeun Tar Bagha	Prasad Khandekar	Girish Kulkarni; Tejaswini Pandit; Vishakha Subhedar; Sayaji Shinde; Namrata Sambherao; Bhau Kadam; Onkar Bhojane; Prasad Khandekar	
D E C	8	London Misal	Jalindar Kumbhar	Bharat Jadhav; Rutuja Bagwe; Ritika Shrotri; Gaurav More; Madhuri Pawar	
D E C	15	Pillu Bachelor	Tanaji Ghadge	Parth Bhalerao; Sayali Sanjeev; Mohan Agashe; Shashank Shende; Akshaya Devdhar; Akshay Tanksale	
D E C	15	Songya	Milind Inamdar	Ajinkya Nanaware; Rutuja Bagwe; Ganesh Yadav; Aparna Kakirde	
D E C	15	Chhapa Kata	Sandeep Manohar Naware	Makarand Anaspure; Tejaswini Lonari; Mohan Joshi; Arun Nalawade; Reena Madhukar	
D E C	15	Club 52	Amit Koli	Hardeek Joshi; Bharat Thakur; Radha Sagar; Shashank Shende	
D E C	15	Lai Jhakaas	Babu Bhatt	Mukesh Bhatt; Manisha Singh; Neesha Parulekar; Uday Tikekar; Nishigandha Wad; Sunil Tawde; Sachin Gawali; Bhau Kadam	

== See also ==
- List of highest-grossing Marathi films
- List of Marathi films of 2024
- List of Marathi films of 2022
