= ChikiChiki BooBoomBoom =

2025 Marathi film by Prasad Mahadev Khandekar

- Theatrical release poster
- Directed by: Prasad Khandekar
- Written by: Prathamesh Shivalkar; Prasad Mahadev Khandekar
- Produced by: Sunil Narkar; Sejal Dipak Painter; Prasad Mahadev Khandekar
- Starring: Swapnil Joshi; Prarthana Behere; Prajakta Mali; Prasad Mahadev Khandekar; Vanita Kharat
- Cinematography: Ganesh Utekar
- Edited by: Nilesh N. Gavand
- Music by: Rohan-Rohan
- Production companies: Narkar Films & Entertainment; Swarna Pat Katha; Prajakar Production
- Release date: 28 February 2025
- Country: India
- Language: Marathi

ChikiChiki BooBoomBoom is a 2025 Indian Marathi-language comedy thriller film directed, co-written and co-produced by Prasad Khandekar under the banner of Prajakar Production, along with Narkar Films & Entertainment and Swarna Pat Katha. The film features an ensemble cast, including Swapnil Joshi, Prarthana Behere, Prajakta Mali, Khandekar, Rohit Mane, Prathamesh Shivalkar, Namrata Sambherao and Vanita Kharat. The story revolves around the reunion of college backbenchers, filled with fun, excitement, and chaos. The music is composed by the duo Rohan-Rohan.

== Cast ==
- Swapnil Joshi as Vaibhav
- Prarthana Behere as Dhanashree
- Prajakta Mali as Ravee
- Prasad Khandekar as Bhaiyya
- Rohit Mane as Tumdev
- Prathamesh Shivalkar as Aditya
- Namrata Sambherao
- Vanita Kharat as Babli
- Onkar Raut as Anush
- Priyadarshani Indalkar as Sweety
- Sachin Goswami as Abadan
- Abhijeet Chavan as Insp. Vitthal Manjrekar
- Aishwarya Badade as Shambhavi
- Chetna Bhat as Vinodini Padhye
- Nikhil Ratnaparkhi as Vikas Padhye
- Aparna Kshemkalyani as Aayela
- Prabhakar More as Naren Appa
- Shyam Rajput
- Nikhil Bane as Gulab
- Pramod Bansode
- Shlok Khandekar as Johnny Lever Padye

== Soundtrack ==
The music for the film is composed by Rohan-Rohan. The first song, "Boom Boom Boom", based on a party theme, was unveiled on 8 February 2025, and is choreographed by Rahul Thombre.

Track listing
No.	Title	Lyrics	Singer(s)	Length
1.	"Boom Boom Boom"	Prashant Madpuwar	Rohan Pradhan	3:40
2.	"Karbhaari"	Mandar Cholkar	Kavita Raam	3:11
3.	"Mitra"	Mandar Cholkar	Rohit Raut, Juilee Joglekar, Rohan Pradhan, Rohan Gokhale	3:00
Total length:				9:51

== Release ==
The teaser was released on 1 February 2025, and the film was released on 28 February 2025. The trailer was released on 19 February 2025.
