= Planet Marathi =

Indian film production company

- Type: Private
- Industry: Entertainment
- Founded: May 2017; 9 years ago
- Founder: Akshay Bardapurkar
- Headquarters: Mumbai, Maharashtra
- Key people: Akshay Bardapurkar
- Products: Film production; Streaming television
- Owner: Akshay Bardapurkar
- Subsidiaries: Planet Marathi Talent; Planet Bharat
- Website: planetmarathi.org

Planet Marathi an Indian film production company founded by Akshay Bardapurkar in 2017, is based in Mumbai and is solely focused on producing Marathi language films and web series. Within a short span, it has emerged as one of the most prominent and prolific production houses in the industry.

== History ==
Planet Marathi was established in May 2017 by entrepreneur Akshay Bardapurkar with a focus on global dissemination of Marathi films, arts, and culture. Before venturing into film production, Bardapurkar launched Planet Marathi Talent, a talent management hub that collaborated with several notable celebrities, including Shivani Baokar, Kranti Redkar, Nikhil Chavan, Amruta Khanvilkar, Siddharth Jadhav and Sayali Sanjeev. The company's debut production was AB Aani CD, directed by Milind Lele, featuring Vikram Gokhale and Amitabh Bachchan (marking his Marathi film debut). The film's theatrical release was disrupted by the COVID-19 pandemic in India but was later made available on Amazon Prime Video. Additionally, Prasad Oak’s directorial venture Chandramukhi, produced by Planet Marathi, was the first big-budget Marathi film to commence shooting post-pandemic, which marked a significant milestone for the industry. In June 2021, June was the first film to be release directly on Planet Marathi OTT.

In 2021, the company launched Planet Marathi OTT, India's first subscription-based video-on-demand streaming platform dedicated to Marathi content. On 31.10.2025, the NCLT, Mumbai admitted a Petition declaring the company bankrupt. Planet Marathi is now under CIRP.

== Production ==
†	Denotes films that have not yet been released

=== Films ===
Year	Title	Director	Cast	Producer(s)	Notes	Ref.
2020	AB Aani CD	Milind Lele	Vikram Gokhale, Amitabh Bachchan	Co-produced by Golden Ratio Films, KVR Persaud Production	Amitabh Bachchan's Marathi film debut	
2021	June	Vaibhav Khisti, Suhrud Godbole	Neha Pendse, Siddharth Menon	Produced by Supri Advertising & Entertainment Pvt. Ltd, Blue Drop Films	Presented by Planet Marathi	
2022	Pondicherry	Sachin Kundalkar	Sai Tamhankar, Vaibhav Tatwawadi, Amruta Khanvilkar	Co-produced by Creative Vibe Productions	One of India's first films to be shot on smartphone	
2022	Chandramukhi	Prasad Oak	Amruta Khanvilkar, Adinath Kothare	Co-produced by Golden Ratio Films, Flying Dragon Entertainment, Creative Vibe		
2022	Tamasha Live	Sanjay Jadhav	Sachit Patil, Sonalee Kulkarni, Siddharth Jadhav, Hemangi kavi	Co-produced by Maooli Productions		
2022	Sahale Re	Mrinal Kulkarni	Mrinal Kulkarni, Subodh Bhave, Sumeet Raghavan			
2022	Sunny	Hemant Dhome	Lalit Prabhakar, Kshitee Jog, Chinmay Mandlekar	Co-produced by Chalchitra Company, Crazy Few Films, Creative Vibe		
2022	Goshta Eka Paithanichi	Shantanu Rode	Sayali Sanjeev, Suvrat Joshi	Co-produced by Golden Ratio, Films Lakeside Productions		

=== Streaming shows ===
Premiere	Title	Director	Cast	Producer(s)	Seasons	Notes	Ref.
December 2021	Anuradha	Sanjay Jadhav	Tejaswini Pandit, Sachit Patil, Sonali Khare	Co-produced by Diamond Entertainment Studio	1 season, 7 episodes		
20 May 2022	Raanbaazaar	Abhijit Panse	Prajaktta Mali, Tejaswini Pandit, Mohan Agashe, Sachin Khedekar, Mohan Joshi	Co-produced by Ravan Future Productions	1 season, 10 episodes		

== See also ==
- Planet Marathi OTT
