= AB Aani CD =

Indian Marathi comedy film by Milind Lele

AB Anni CD
- Theatrical release poster
- Directed by: Milind Lele
- Written by: Hemant Edlabadkar
- Produced by: Abhayananad Singh; Akshay Bardapurkar; Arvind Reddy; Krishna Persaud; Piyush Singh
- Starring: Vikram Gokhale; Subodh Bhave
- Cinematography: Suresh Deshmane
- Edited by: Mayur Hardas
- Music by: Rahul Ranade
- Production companies: Planet Marathi; Golden Ratio Films; KV Reddy Productions
- Distributed by: Amazon Prime Video
- Release date: 1 May 2020
- Running time: 153 minutes
- Country: India
- Language: Marathi

AB Aani CD (transl. AB and CD) is a 2020 Indian Marathi-language comedy film directed by Milind Lele, produced by Abhayananad Singh, Akshay Bardapurkar, Arvind Reddy, Krishna Persaud and Piyush Singh under banner of Planet Marathi, Golden Ratio Films and KCR Reddy Production. The film starring Vikram Gokhale, Subodh Bhave, Sayali Sanjeev and Akshay Tanksale The film also has a cameo by Amitabh Bachchan as himself.

The principal photography began on 20 May 2019 and wrapped up on 7 August 2019. The film was released on 13 March 2020 and also on Amazon Prime Video on 1 May 2020.

== Cast ==
- Amitabh Bachchan as Himself (AB; cameo appearance)
- Vikram Gokhale as Chandrakant Deshpande (CD)
- Akshay Tanksale as Sunny Deshpande (CD's grandson)
- Sayali Sanjeev as Gargi (Sunny's Pune-based girlfriend)
- Subodh Bhave as owner of Planet Marathi (Gargi's employer)
- Sakshi Satish as Shravni Deshpande (CD's granddaughter)
- Lokesh Gupte as Govind Deshpande (CD's older son)
- Sharvari Lokohare as Radha Deshpande (CD's older daughter-in-law)
- Sagar Talashikar as Gopal Deshpande (CD's younger son)
- Seema Deshmukh as CD's younger daughter-in-law
- Jayant Sawarkar as Shivalkar (CD's friend)
- Sunil Godbole as Sawant (CD's friend)
- Milind Shintr as Tailor (Special Appearance)
- Prashant Tapasvi as Canteen Owner (Special Appearance)
- Devaki Pandit as Herself (Cameo Appearance)

== Production ==
=== Filming ===
Principal photography began on 20 May 2019 at Mumbai. Filming also took place at Pune. Principal photography wrapped on 7 August 2019.

This Marathi Feature Film is produced by Abhayanand Singh & Piyush Singh from Golden Ratio Films, Arvind Reddy & Krishna Persaud from KV Reddy Productions and Akshay Bardapurkar from Planet Marathi

=== Release ===
The film was released on 13 March 2020 but was pulled out of theaters because of COVID-19 pandemic lockdown in India. Later the film was released on Amazon prime on 1 May 2020.

== Soundtrack ==
AB Aani CD

Soundtrack album by Mayuresh Pai, Ashish Mujumdar
- Released: 2 March 2020
- Recorded: 2020
- Genre: Feature film soundtrack
- Length: 8:03
- Language: Marathi
- Label: Zee Music Company
External audio
- Audio Jukebox on YouTube

Soundtrack of the film was composed by Mayuresh Pai and Ashish Mujumdar whereas lyrics were penned by Vaibhav Joshi. The music was arranged by Anand Sahastrabuddhe.

Track listing
No.	Title	Lyrics	Music	Singer(s)	Length
1.	"Asa Haath Haati"	Vaibhav Joshi	Mayuresh Pai	Mekhala Khadikar	3:40
2.	"Jeevanacha Sohala"	Vaibhav Joshi	Ashish Mujumdar	Devki Pandit	4:23
Total length:					8:03
