= Kalawati =

Upcoming Indian film directed by Sanjay Jadhav

Kalaawati
- First look poster
- Directed by: Sanjay Jadhav
- Screenplay by: Mathew Fresche
- Story by: Nishant A Bhuse; Anuja Karnik
- Produced by: Prajay Kamat; Ayden Correia; Tabrez Patel; Praveen Mehta; Ethan Mendes; Naveen Kohli
- Starring: Owen Bodyul; Sanjay Narvekar; Tejaswini Lonari; Harish Dudhade; Onkar Bhojane
- Cinematography: Sanjay Jadhav
- Edited by: Jackson Cale
- Music by: John Taylor
- Production companies: MergeXR Studio; AVK Entertainment; Fifth Horizon
- Country: India
- Language: Marathi

Kalaawati is an upcoming Marathi-language horror comedy film directed by Sanjay Jadhav. The film stars Amruta Khanvilkar in the titular role, alongside an ensemble cast of Sanjay Narvekar, Tejaswini Lonari, Onkar Bhojane, Harish Dudhade, and Neel Salekar.

The film was officially announced in February 2023. Principal photography began in February 2023. The music is composed by Pankaj Padghan, while the cinematography is handled by Jadhav himself.

== Cast ==
- Amruta Khanvilkar as Kalaawati
- Sanjay Narvekar as Santosh
- Tejaswini Lonari as Neha
- Onkar Bhojane as Ambadas
- Harish Dudhade as Akhil
- Dipti Dhotre as Rekha
- Abhijit Chavan as Ninad
- Neel Salekar as Abhay
- Sanjay Shejwal as Arav
- Rutuja Bagwe

== Production ==
Kalaawati will be the first film by director Jadhav in the horror comedy genre.

On 26 February 2023, Jadhav announced the film through a graphic poster featuring Khanvilkar in a mysterious look behind the curtain. The same day, the muhurta ceremony was concluded at Ajivasan Studios in Mumbai, where, along with the cast and crew, famous music composer and film director Avadhoot Gupte was present as a chief guest.

The principal photography commenced in late February 2023. The majority of the film was shot in and around London, including Meidenhead. Khanvilkar had wrapped up her first schedule portions in March. and shot her remaining scenes at Film City, Mumbai, in early November 2023. The last filming schedule was completed on 17 November 2023.

== Sequel ==
In mid-March 2023, writer Anuja Karnik and Nishant A Bhuse revealed that they had already written the sequel idea and were waiting for Kalaawati to be complete first.
