= Chikeezing =

2026 Marathi-language film

- चिकीझिंग
- Directed by: Rajendra Bagate; Vaibhav Kulkarni
- Screenplay by: Vaibhav Kulkarni
- Story by: Rajendra Bagate
- Produced by: Supriya Bagate – Producer; Shabbir Sabuwala – Co-producer; Rachna Vora – Co-producer; Karan Chavan – Co-producer; Hrishikesh Deshmukh – Co-producer; Sid Vinsurkar – Co-producer; Umesh Kulkarni - Co-producer
- Starring: Krushnaraj Waingade; Prabhakar More; Sejal Kore; Amruta Suresh; Gayatri Deshpande; Aditya Ghanshyam; Rahul Kulkarni; Sonali Ghatnekar
- Cinematography: Pravin Sonawane
- Edited by: Shekhar Gurav; S. Shankar
- Music by: Srinidhi Venkat; Hrishikesh Kulkarni
- Production companies: Theme Team Studio Production; Keyframe Production
- Release date: November 19, 2026 (India)
- Running time: 96 minutes
- Country: India
- Language: Marathi

Chikeezing is an upcoming Indian Marathi-language film directed by Rajendra Bagate and Vaibhav Kulkarni. The film is produced by Supriya Bagate and stars Krushnaraj Waingade, Prabhakar More, Sejal Kore and Amruta Suresh.

The film is scheduled for theatrical release on 19 November 2026.

== Plot ==
The film follows Chikya, a young boy from a financially disadvantaged family living in a hill village. Every Saturday, he accompanies his mother to the residential school where she works. Fascinated by the school's surroundings and its facilities, he develops a desire to enter the institution. The story follows his experiences, family circumstances and efforts to pursue his aspiration.

== Cast ==
- Krushnaraj Waingade as Chikya
- Prabhakar More
- Sejal Kore
- Amruta Suresh
- Gayatri Deshpande
- Aditya Ghanshyam
- Rahul Kulkarni
- Dr. Sonali Ghatnekar

== Production ==
The film was produced by Theme Team Studio Production in association with Keyframe Production. Supriya Bagate served as the producer. Dippak Wani and Jaiprakash Bhande presented the film.

Rajendra Bagate wrote the story, while Vaibhav Kulkarni handled the screenplay and dialogues. Pravin Sonawane served as the cinematographer, and Shekhar Gurav and S. Shankar worked on the editing. The music was composed by Srinidhi Venkat and Hrishikesh Kulkarni.

== Film festival screenings ==
Chikeezing was included in the feature-film programme of the 24th Riverside International Film Festival in April 2026. It was listed in the festival's schedule for 10 April 2026.

== Release ==
The film received a U certificate from the Central Board of Film Certification on 25 November 2025. The certified runtime was 96 minutes.

The film was scheduled to be released theatrically in India on 19 November 2026.
