= Sur Lagu De =

2024 Indian Marathi-language film

- Directed by: Pravin E Birje
- Written by: Ashish Deo
- Produced by: Nitin Upadhyaya; Abhishek Kumar
- Starring: Vikram Gokhale; Suhasini Mulay; Reena Madhukar
- Cinematography: Lawrence Alex DCunha; Ravi Parcha
- Music by: Pankaj Padghan
- Production company: Oddball Motion Pictures
- Release date: 2 February 2024
- Country: India
- Language: Marathi

Sur Lagu De is a 2024 Indian Marathi-language family drama film directed by Pravin E. Birje and produced by Abhishek Kumar and Nitin Upadhyaya starring Vikram Gokhale and Suhasini Mulay. It was reportedly considered as the last film of veteran actor Vikram Gokhale before his death. The film was released on 2 February 2024 in theatres.

== Plot ==
An ageing man Mr. Mohan Damle is a retired accountant, who lost his son and daughter-in-law in a tragic accident and left with two grandsons and a wife. On an unfortunate day, his grandson is diagnosed with blood cancer and urgently requires a costly bone marrow transplant. What will he do?

== Cast ==
- Vikram Gokhale
- Suhasini Mulay
- Reena Madhukar
- Sunil Godabole
- Nitin Jadhav
- Siddheshwar Zadbuke
- Meghna Naidu
- Reema agarwal

== Release ==
The film was scheduled for release on 12 January 2024 but was postponed and film was released on 2 February 2024 and opened to mixed reviews.

== Music ==
The music is composed by Pankaj Padghan.
