= Priyadarshini Indalkar =

Indian Actress (born 1997)

- Born: 19 June 1997 (age 29); Sangli, Maharashtra, India
- Education: Bachelor of Engineering
- Occupation: Actor

Priyadarshini Indalkar is an Indian actress who works predominantly in Marathi films and television. Known for her comic timing on the Sony Marathi sketch-comedy show Maharashtrachi Hasyajatra, she went on to lead several Marathi feature films and is a recipient of a Filmfare Award.

Born in Sangli and raised in Pune, Indalkar trained in Bharatanatyam and began performing as a child on the ETV Marathi talent show Aflatoon Little Masters before working in Marathi theatre in plays. She had a recurring part in the television series Assa Maher Nako Ga Bai and a brief role in the film Photoprem (2021), but achieved wider recognition as a regular performer on Maharashtrachi Hasyajatra. Her breakthrough in films came with the romantic drama Phulrani (2023) opposite Subodh Bhave, for which she won the Filmfare Award for Best Female Debut – Marathi.

Indalkar has since appeared as a lead in Navardev Bsc. Agri. (2024) and Lagnacha Shot (2026), and in the web series Shantit Kranti (2023). In 2025 she featured in Subodh Khanolkar's Dashavatar, the highest-grossing Marathi film of the year.

== Early life and education ==
Priyadarshini Indalkar was born on 19 June 1997 in Sangli, Maharashtra, and grew up in Pune. She attended Renuka Swarup Memorial Girls High School and went on to completed her Bachelor of Engineering in Information Technology from Pune Vidhyarthi Griha's College of Engineering and Technology in Pune. After completing her Bachelors, she briefly worked as an engineer, before resigning in anticipation of joining the National School of Drama, where she cleared the entrance process but narrowly missed admission, ranking twenty-seventh among twenty-six selected candidates.

== Career ==
As a child she participated in Aflatoon Little Masters, a stand-up comedy competition programme for children on ETV Marathi, where she emerged as the winner. While studying at college in Pune, Indalkar participated in several intercollegiate one-act play competitions, including the Maunantar Karandak, Purushottam Karandak, Sarpotdar Karandak, Firodiya Karandak and Loksatta Ekankika competition. She received second place in the acting category at the Firodiya Karandak in 2016. During this period, she also began undertaking dubbing and voice-over assignments.

After completing her studies, she moved to Mumbai to pursue a career in acting. She began performing professionally in Marathi theatre and continued working in dubbing and voice-over projects. During this period, she became friends with actress Vanita Kharat, with whom she later appeared on the Sony Marathi sketch-comedy series Maharashtrachi Hasyajatra. Indalkar has stated that she was initially rejected during the show's selection process before eventually being cast. She made her film debut with a brief role in Photoprem (2021), followed by a supporting role in Soyrik (2022). She subsequently appeared in the comedy-drama BhauBali (2022), which received positive reviews.

In 2023, Indalkar made her streaming debut in the Hindi-language web series Farzi, in which she played a receptionist, alongside Shahid Kapoor and Vijay Sethupathi. She then played the titular role of a florist in Phulrani, a Marathi romantic drama adapted from George Bernard Shaw's play Pygmalion. Starring opposite Subodh Bhave, the film follows a beauty-pageant coach who takes on the challenge of transforming a florist from a Koli fishing community into a pageant winner. Writing for Sakal, critic Devendra Jadhav praised Indalkar's performance as the film's biggest strength, noting that she had already made her mark as an actress and that audiences would take to her "rowdy style" on screen. She won Best Female Debut and received a nomination for Best Actress at the Filmfare Awards Marathi. Later that year, she joined the cast of Shantit Kranti for its second season.

The following year, she played the female lead in Navardev Bsc. Agri., which follows a B.Sc. Agriculture graduate who returns to his village to modernise farming and falls in love with a woman while facing rejection from prospective brides because he is "just a farmer". Her performance earned her nominations for Best Actress at the Zee Chitra Gaurav Puraskar, MaTa Sanman and Filmfare Awards Marathi. She also appeared in the supernatural thriller Rukhwat, opposite Santosh Juvekar, portraying dual roles as Mahima and Nishigandha, her counterpart from a previous life. Indalkar described the film as depicting a couple's relationship as a bond spanning seven births, while the film received unfavorable reviews from critics.

In 2025, she was cast in Dashavatar, a suspense thriller written and directed by Subodh Khanolkar, in which she played Vandu, the girlfriend of Madhav (Siddharth Menon) who becomes part of his family and ultimately carries forward their cultural and environmental cause. Set in the Konkan region, the film follows an ageing performer of the traditional Dashavatar folk theatre whose final performance blurs the boundary between ritual and reality. Indalkar said that the role developed differently on set from how she had imagined it, and that convincing audiences that she belonged to the Konkan region without relying on the local dialect was the central challenge of the part. Dashavatar became the highest-grossing Marathi film of 2025, grossing over ₹29 crore worldwide, and was the first Marathi film to be submitted for the general competition category of the Academy Awards. Indalkar received a nomination for Best Supporting Actress at the Filmfare Awards Marathi. That year, she also appeared in the films Samsara and Gaadi Number 1760.

== Filmography ==
=== Films ===
Year	Title	Role	Notes	Ref
2021	Photoprem	Unnamed		
2022	Soyrik	Unnamed		
2022	BhauBali	Chinmayee Aawalaskar (Chinu)		
2023	Phulrani	Shevanta Tandel (Phulrani)		
2023	Anurup	Pooja	Short film	
2024	Navardev Bsc. Agri	Sukanya		
2024	Rukhwat	Mahima / Nishigandha		
2025	ChikiChiki BooBoomBoom	Sweety		
2025	Woong Woong	Wife	Short film	
2025	Samsara	Bhanvi		
2025	Gaadi Number 1760	Chinu		
2025	Love By Chance	Shalmali	Short film	
2025	Dashavatar	Vandana Soman (Vandu)		
2026	Lagnacha Shot	Krutika		
2026	Gandhi Talks	Journalist		
2026	Jayanti 2	Tanuja Shinde		
2026	Bandkhor	Meera		

=== Television ===
Year	Title	Role	Notes	Ref
2010	Aflatoon Little Masters	Contestant	Winner	
2020–2021	Assa Maher Nako Ga Baai!	Sunaina		
2022–present	Maharashtrachi Hasyajatra	Contestant		

=== Web series ===
Year	Title	Role	Network	Notes	Ref
2023	Farzi	Ishwari Patil	Amazon Prime Video		
2023	Shantit Kranti	Samruddhi	SonyLIV	Season 2	

=== Play ===
- Maunaantar
- Khamoshi
- Parana

== Awards ==
Year	Awards	Category	Film	Result	Ref.
2023	Kashish Social Foundation	Global Icons of India Award	–	Honoured	
2024	Filmfare Awards Marathi	Best Actress	Phulrani	Nominated	
2024	Filmfare Awards Marathi	Best Female Debut	Phulrani	Won	
2024	Akhil Bharatiya Marathi Natya Parishad	Indira Chitnis Memorial Comedienne Award	–	Honoured	
2024	Vinodottam Karandak	Vinodveer Award	–	Honoured	
2024	Sakal Premier Award	Best Debut Face	Phulrani	Won	
2025	City Cine Awards	Best Actress	Navardev Bsc. Agri.	Nominated	
2025	Filmfare Awards Marathi	Best Actress	Navardev Bsc. Agri.	Nominated	
2025	Zee Chitra Gaurav Puraskar	Best Actress	Navardev Bsc. Agri.	Nominated	
2025	MaTa Sanman	Best Actress	Navardev Bsc. Agri.	Nominated	
2026	Savitribai Phule Pune University	Yuva Gaurav Puraskar	–	Honoured	
2026	Indian National Cine Academy	Best Actress	Dashavatar	Nominated	
2026	Filmfare Awards Marathi	Best Supporting Actress	Dashavatar	Nominated	
