= Ye Re Ye Re Paisa =

- Film poster
- Directed by: Sanjay Jadhav
- Written by: Sanjay Jadhav; Arvind Jagtap
- Produced by: Om Prakash Bhatt; Swati Khopkar; Ameya Khopkar; Sujay Shankarwar; Rajesh Banga
- Starring: Umesh Kamat; Siddharth Jadhav; Tejaswini Pandit
- Cinematography: Pushpank Gawade
- Edited by: Apurva Motiwale; Ashish Mhatre
- Music by: Amitraj; Pankaj Padghan
- Production companies: Zee Studios; Ameya Vinod Khopkar Entertainment; Trance FX Studios; Purple Bull Entertainment
- Distributed by: Zee Studios
- Release date: 5 January 2018
- Country: India
- Language: Marathi

Ye Re Ye Re Paisa (lit. 'Let money come') is a 2018 Indian Marathi language comedy-drama film directed by Sanjay Jadhav. The film stars Umesh Kamat, Siddharth Jadhav and Tejaswini Pandit in the lead roles. It also stars Sanjay Narvekar and Mrinal Kulkarni in supporting roles. It was released on 5 January 2018.

== Plot ==
The story starts with Sunny (Siddhartha Jadhav) who beats the man who sells the film tickets in black to see Bubli (Tejaswini Pandit) is a side dancer but want to become an actress. A famous director then enters the sets where Bubli was present. He argues that he wants a black old-fashioned car and then Bubli remembers that Sunny wanted to give the same car to Babli which she refuses. Then, Sunny gives the car to Bubli, but the problem occurs when it is revealed that the director wanted to explode the car. Sunny realizes that the car was of Anna (Sanjay Narvekar) who is a gangster whose real name is Jaggu. Then, we see that a construction worker (Umesh Kamat) ask a man to carry a flag and later it is revealed that the man was pranked for carrying a flag to carry a campaign. Later, it is revealed that worker was none other than Aditya who is big fan of Shahrukh Khan and wants to become actor like him. Aditya then becomes involved in the problem when he pranked Anna as police inspector with his friends but one of his friend double-crossed him as he runs away with Anna's money carried in same black car and then Aditya seeks help from a businessman who claims he have to steal a diamond worth Anna's money from Janhavi Mujumdar (Amogh Kulkarni). Bubli and Sunny (believing their friend's misunderstanding of Aditya being a son of famous businessman.) kidnaps Aditya but after learning the truth, the three form a team and vows to steal the diamond by making Janhavi believe that Aditya was possessed by the dead husband of Janhavi who was the owner of this diamond but during the robbery, they end up sharing fake diamonds against themselves and hence, fooled each other in the process, making Anna angry. The rest of film shows the chase behind police, the team and Anna. At the end, Janhavi was arrested, Aditya, Bubli and Sunny resumed their normal lives and Anna married a gay African.

== Cast ==
- Umesh Kamat as Aditya
- Siddharth Jadhav as Sunny
- Tejaswini Pandit as Bubli
- Sanjay Narvekar as Anna
- Vishakha Subhedar as Ranjana
- Bijoy Anand as Vijay Mehra
- Mrinal Kulkarni as Janhavi Mujumdar
- Tushar Dalvi as Harsh
- Anand Ingle as Pradyuman
- Kishore Kumar as Aditya's Ajobas

== Sequel ==
A sequel to the film, Ye Re Ye Re Paisa 2 was theatrically released on 4 January 2019. A threequel to the film, Ye Re Ye Re Paisa 3, was theatrically released on 18 July 2025.
