= Ye Re Ye Re Paisa 3 =

2025 Marathi film

- Directed by: Sanjay Jadhav
- Written by: Sanjay Jadhav
- Produced by: Sudhir Kolte; Onkar Sushama Mane; Amey Khopkar; Swati Khopkar; Om Prakash Bhatt; Nasir Sharif; Ninad Nandkumar Battin; Giridhar Dhumal
- Starring: Sanjay Narvekar; Siddharth Jadhav; Umesh Kamat; Tejaswini Pandit
- Cinematography: Prasad Bhende
- Edited by: Apurva Motiwale Sahai
- Music by: Amitraj; Pankaj Padghan
- Production companies: Ameya Vinod Khopkar Films; Udaharnarth Nirmit; Nuclear Arrow Pictures
- Distributed by: Dharma Productions
- Release date: 18 July 2025
- Running time: 139 minutes
- Country: India
- Language: Marathi

Ye Re Ye Re Paisa 3 is a 2025 Indian Marathi-language comedy-drama film directed by Sanjay Jadhav. It is the third instalment in the Ye Re Ye Re Paisa film series. The film stars Sanjay Narvekar, Siddharth Jadhav, Umesh Kamat, and Tejaswini Pandit in the lead roles, with Vishakha Subhedar, Anand Ingle, Vanita Kharat, and Nagesh Bhonsle appearing in supporting roles.

The film was announced in May 2024 The film was released on 18 July 2025. It was theatrically released on 18 July 2025 and is presented by Dharma Productions, marking the banner's return to Marathi cinema after Bucket List (2018).

== Cast ==
- Sanjay Narvekar as Anna / Jaggu
- Siddharth Jadhav as Sunny
- Umesh Kamat as Aditya
- Tejaswini Pandit as Bubbly
- Vishakha Subhedar as Ranjana
- Anand Ingale as Pradyumna Farande / Tenya
- Nagesh Bhosale as Inspector Vijay Dinanath Rane
- Vanita Kharat as Esha Danve Patil
- Jaywant Wadkar as Raghuveer Danve Patil
- Mira Jagannath as Mona
- Bijay Anand
- Sonali Khare as herself; cameo appearance in the song "Udat Gela Sonya"
- Ishan Khopkar as himself; cameo appearance in the song "Udat Gela Sonya"

== Production ==
Principal photography began in July 2024 in Mumbai, with the muhurat shot attended by Yogesh Tilekar, Abhijit Panse, Sandeep Deshpande, and Nanubhai Jaisinghani. Siddharth Jadhav, Umesh Kamat, and Tejaswini Pandit returned to the franchise after appearing in the first instalment, while Sanjay Narvekar, Anand Ingle, and Vishakha Subhedar featured in all three instalments of the series.

The film also marks the acting debut of Ishaan Khopkar, son of producer Amey Khopkar.

== Music ==
Track listing
No.	Title	Lyrics	Music	Singer(s)	Length
1.	"Ye Re Ye Re Paisa 3 – Title Track"	Sachin Pathak	Amitraj	Adarsh Shinde, Vaishali Samant, Amitraj	4:09
2.	"Udat Gela Sonya"	Dr. Vinayak Pawar	Pankaj Padghan	Sayalie Pankaj, Ravindra Khomne, Radha Khude, Saurabh Salunke, Munavvar Ali, Apurva Nisshad and Savni Bhatt & chorus	4:34
3.	"Aali Re Aali Gulabachi Kali"	Sachin Pathak	Pankaj Padghan	Bela Shende & chorus	2:45
Total length:					11:28

== Release and reception ==
Following the success of the first two instalments, the filmmakers announced the third film in May 2024, initially scheduling its release for 1 November 2024. The release was later postponed to 3 January 2025, before finally being theatrically released on 18 July 2025. The film was presented by Karan Johar's Dharma Productions.

The title song was released in June 2025 in the presence of Mahesh Manjrekar and Salman Khan. The trailer was launched by Rohit Shetty along with Maharashtra Navnirman Sena leader Raj Thackeray. A special screening was held ahead of the release, attended by several Marathi film industry personalities, including Priya Bapat, Sharad Kelkar, Adinath Kothare, Laxman Utekar, and Ahmed Khan.

The film was released alongside Saiyaara, Tanvi the Great, and Sant Tukaram. Although it received a positive initial response from audiences, the film was removed from several multiplexes within a week, reportedly to accommodate screenings of Saiyaara. This decision led to protests from the MNS and Shiv Sena (UBT) leader Sanjay Raut. As a result, the film underperformed at the box office.

=== Critical response ===
Kalpeshraj Kubal of Maharashtra Times rated the film 3 out of 5 stars, called it “a ‘pissi’ of coloured cards” and noted its confusing narrative. Writing for The Times of India, Anub George awarded the film 2.5 out of 5 stars, citing uneven pacing, editing issues, and lost humour despite strong performances, and stated that it “fulfills its titular promise but misses its mark for the audience”, with 2.5 stars. Anupama Goons of Pudhari gave the film 3.5 out of 5 stars, observing that while it conveys the message that “without hard work and trust, love or money does not last”, its roundabout storytelling and conventional treatment reduce its overall impact.
