= Maharashtrachi Hasyajatra =

Indian Marathi-language comedy reality show

- Genre: Comedy
- Written by: Rishikant Raut; Sachin Mote; Prathamesh Shivalkar; Shramesh Betkar; Vinayak Purushottam; Abhijeet Pawar; Prasad Khandekar; Samir Choughule
- Directed by: Sachin Goswami
- Presented by: Prajakta Mali
- Judges: Sai Tamhankar; Prasad Oak; Alka Kubal; Makarand Anaspure; Mahesh Kothare; Siddhartha Jadhav; Sonali Kulkarni; Pushkar Shrotri
- Country of origin: India
- Original language: Marathi
- No. of seasons: 5
- No. of episodes: 803

Production
- Executive producer: Dashrath Shirsat
- Producers: Sachin Goswami; Sachin Mote
- Camera setup: Multi-camera
- Running time: 45-90 minutes
- Production company: Wet Cloud Production

Original release
- Network: Sony Marathi
- Release: 22 August 2018 – present

Maharashtrachi Hasyajatra (transl. Comedy fair of Maharashtra) is an Indian Marathi-language comedy show which premiered on Sony Marathi on 22 August 2018. It is produced by Sachin Goswami and Sachin Mote under the banner of Wet Cloud Production. It is hosted by Prajakta Mali.

== Season summary ==
Year	Season	Host	Judges	Winners
2018	Maharashtrachi Hasyajatra 1	Prajakta Mali	Sai Tamhankar; Prasad Oak	Gaurav More; Vanita Kharat
2019	Maharashtrachi Hasyajatra 2	Prajakta Mali	Sai Tamhankar; Prasad Oak; Mahesh Kothare	Prithvik Pratap; Sheetal Kulkarni
2020	Maharashtrachi Hasyajatra – Vindoacha Nava Hangam	Prajakta Mali	Sai Tamhankar; Prasad Oak; Alka Kubal; Makarand Anaspure	Shramesh Betkar; Prathamesh Shivalkar
2021	Maharashtrachi Hasyajatra - Navya Korya Vinodacha Punha Hangam	Prajakta Mali	Sai Tamhankar; Prasad Oak	

== Concept ==
It is a Marathi language stand up comedy reality show where popular Marathi actors and professional comedians perform skits on stage. Skits' duration is around 12 to 15 minutes. First of all host of show (Prajakta Mali) briefly introduces subject of skit to audience & Judges (Prasad Oak, Sai Tamhankar). Then all comedians perform their act (skit). Judges give them comments as per their performances. As this show has been extremely popular, many celebrities too use this platform for promoting their films, dramas and webseries & they also take part in skit as guest performer.

== Judges ==
Judges	Season 1	Season 2	Season 3	Season 4
Sai Tamhankar	Main (2018–present)			
Prasad Oak	Main (2018–present)			
Sonali Kulkarni			Main (2022-present)	
Mahesh Kothare		Main (2019)		
Alka Kubal			Main (2020)	
Makarand Anaspure			Main (2020)	
Siddharth Jadhav		Recurring (2019-2021)		
Pushkar Shrotri		Recurring (2019-2020)		

=== Guest Judge ===
- Sunil Barve
- Usha Nadkarni
- Swapnil Joshi
- Bharti Achrekar
- Johnny Lever
- Anu Malik
- Nirmiti Sawant
- Mahesh Manjrekar
- Shivaji Satam
- Ashwini Bhave

== Cast ==
Color key
Hasya Khurda
Hasya Budruk

Team	Cast	Season 1	Season 2	Season 3	Season 4
	Prasad Khandekar	Captain (2018–present)			
	Namrata Sambherao	Captain (2018)	Quit	Captain (2019–present)	
	Samir Choughule	Captain (2018–present)			
	Vishakha Subhedar	Captain (2018 - 2022)			
	Gaurav More	Winner (2018)	Performer (2019–2025)		
	Vanita Kharat	Winner (2018)	Performer (2019)	Performer (2019) and Captain (2019)	Performer (2019–present)
	Shramesh Betkar	Runner-up (2018)	Performer (2019)	Winner (2019)	Performer (2022-present)
	Prathamesh Shivalkar	Runner-up (2018)	Performer (2019)	Winner (2019)	Performer (2022-present)
	Rasika Vengurlekar	2nd Runner-up (2018)	Performer (2019–present)		
	Mukesh Jadhav	2nd Runner-up (2018)	Not Participated		Not Participated
	Anvita Phaltankar	3rd Runner-up (2018)	Quit		
	Mandar Mandavkar	3rd Runner-up (2018)	Quit		
	Sayali Parab	4th Runner-up (2018)	Performer (2019)		
	Nitin Jadhav	4th Runner-up (2018)	Quit		
	Ajay Kamble	4th Runner-up (2018)	Quit		
	Bhakti Ratnaparkhi	5th Runner-up (2018)	Performer (2019)	Quit	Quit
	Ashutosh Wadekar	5th Runner-up (2018)	Quit	Quit	Quit
	Shailesh Korde	6th Runner-up (2018)	Quit	Quit	Quit
	Mahendra Khillare	6th Runner-up (2018)	Quit	Quit	Quit
	Ankit Mhatre	7th Runner-up (2018)	Quit	Quit	Quit
	Mayuri Mohite	7th Runner-up (2018)	Quit	Quit	Quit
	Pandharinath Kamble	Guest Performer (2018)	Captain (2019–2022)		
	Arun Kadam	Guest Performer (2018)	Captain (2019–present)		
	Anshuman Vichare	Guest Performer (2018)	Captain (2019–2022)		
	Prabhakar More	Guest Performer (2018)	Performer (2019–present)		
	Suhas Paranjape	Guest Performer (2018)	Performer (2019-2021)		
	Sandesh Upashyam	Guest Performer (2018)	Performer (2019-2020)		Quit
	Rohit Chavan	Guest Performer (2018)	Performer (2019-2020)		Quit
	Shyam Rajput	Guest Performer (2018)	Performer (2019–present)		
	Prithvik Pratap	Not Participated	Winner (2019)	Quit	Performer (2021–present)
	Sheetal Kulkarni	Not Participated	Winner (2019)	Quit	Quit
	Shivali Parab	Not Participated	Runner-up (2019)	Performer (July 2020 – present)	
	Shivali Parab	Not Participated	Runner-up (2019)	Performer (2019)	Quit
	Sachin Gavade	Not Participated	Runner-up (2019)	Performer (2020)	Quit
	Nimish Kulkarni	Not Participated	2nd Runner-up (2019)	Performer (July 2020 – June 2022)	
	Nimish Kulkarni	Not Participated	2nd Runner-up (2019)	Performer (2019)	Quit
	Chetana Bhat	Not Participated	2nd Runner-up (2019)	Performer (2019–present)	
	Renuka Bodhankar	Not Participated	3rd Runner-up (2018)	Quit	Quit
	Akshay Joshi	Not Participated	3rd Runner-up (2018)	Quit	Quit
	Kiran Dange	Not Participated	4th Runner-up (2018)	Quit	Quit
	Niyati Ghate	Not Participated	4th Runner-up (2018)	Quit	Quit
	Akshay Dhamal	Not Participated	5th Runner-up (2018)	Quit	Quit
	Pranita Salunkhe	Not Participated	5th Runner-up (2018)	Quit	Quit
	Ashish Pawar	Not Participated	Quit	Performer (July 2020 - 2021)	Quit
	Onkar Bhojane	Not Participated	Performer (2019–2022)		
	Bhushan Kadu	Not Participated	Quit	Performer (July 2020 - 2021)	

- Priyadarshini Indalkar (2020–present)
- Nikhil Bane (2018–present)
- Dattu More (2022-present)
- Viraj Jagtap (2022-present)
- Ashish Pawar (2022)
- Rohit Mane (2022-present)
- Onkar Raut (2022-present)
- Esha Dey (2023-present)

=== Guests Comedians ===
- Sulekha Talwalkar
- Anupama Takmoghe
- Atul Todankar
- Prajakta Hanamghar
- Anand Ingale
- Surekha Kudachi
- Chinmayee Sumeet
- Suvedha Desai
- Rujuta Deshmukh
- Bhargavi Chirmule
- Bharat Jadhav
- Meghana Erande
- Jyoti Subhash
- Apurva Nemlekar
- Subodh Bhave
- Prasad Jawade
- Sudhir Nikam
- Mahesh Manjrekar
- Lalit Prabhakar
- Rohit Raut
- Subhash Ghai
- Rohit Haldikar
- Sonali Parchure
- Vijay Patkar
- Atul Gogavale
- Bhuvan Bam
- Akshay Tanksale
- Ranveer Singh
