= RaanBaazaar =

2022 Indian web series

- Official release poster
- Genre: Thriller
- Created by: Akshay Bardapurkar
- Screenplay by: Abhijeet Panse; Amol Bhor
- Directed by: Abhijeet Panse
- Starring: Tejaswini Pandit; Prajakta Mali; Urmilla Kothare; Sachin Khedekar; Mohan Agashe; Makarand Anaspure; Mohan Joshi; Anant Jog; Madhuri Pawar
- Music by: AV Prafullachandra
- Country of origin: India
- Original language: Marathi
- No. of seasons: 1
- No. of episodes: 10

Production
- Producers: Akshay Bardapurkar; Abhijeet Panse; Anita Palande
- Production location: India
- Cinematography: Sandeep Yadav
- Editor: Nilesh Gavand
- Running time: 45 mins
- Production companies: Planet Marathi; Raavan Future Productions

Original release
- Network: Planet Marathi
- Release: 20 May 2022

RaanBaazaar is an Indian Marathi-language thriller-drama web series written and directed by Abhijeet Panse. The show features Tejaswini Pandit, Prajakta Mali, Mohan Agashe, Makarand Anaspure, Sachin Khedekar. The series was launched on 20 May 2022, garnered acclaim across Maharashtra due to its compelling narrative rooted in real-life events.

== Plot ==
In a state government, things get all shaky because two people doing an old job accidentally become super important in a mix of politics, power, and secret plans. The choices these two make mess up the political world, making the stable government start wobbling because of unexpected problems and how people relate to each other.

As the story goes on, the government machine that used to run smoothly now struggles with the results, and the state government is almost falling apart. This interesting story shows how personal decisions mix up with big government stuff, showing a lively picture where power structures and people's lives come together in a story that goes beyond what society expects.

== Cast ==
- Tejaswini Pandit as Ayesha Singh
- Prajakta Mali as Ratna
- Urmilla Kothare as Nisha Jain
- Sachin Khedekar as Yusuf Patel
- Mohan Agashe as Satish Naik
- Makarand Anaspure as Appa Divekar
- Mohan Joshi as Sayajirao Patil
- Anant Jog as Joint CP Bantya Raosaheb
- Madhuri Pawar as Prerna Patil-Sane aka Taisaheb
- Abhijeet Panse as Inspector Charudatta Mokashi
- Vaibhav Mangle as Sub-Inspector Palande
- Vanita Kharat as Bina Singh
- Surekha Kudachi as Akka
- Prabhakar More as Palande's friend
- Vandana Vaknis as Sayajirao's wife
- Niranjan Javir as Rupesh Varde
- Chaitali Kohli as P. A. Gaikar
- Kirti Mahadik as Ayesha Singh

== Series overview ==
No.	Title	Directed by	Written by	Original release date
1	"Kaand"	Abhijeet Panse	Abhijeet Panse; Amol Bhor	20 May 2022
Appa Divekar, a wise retired journalist, shares the tale of Maharashtra's government downfall with two young reporters. In a quiet newsroom corner, he unfolds the story of political twists, corruption, and power struggles that shook the state. Through his experienced eyes, the young journalists glimpse the past, inheriting the torch of journalistic legacy as they absorb the turbulent narrative of Maharashtra's political history.
2	"Karma"	Abhijeet Panse	Abhijeet Panse; Amol Bhor	20 May 2022
Chaos ensues as the leader of the opposition, Sayajirao Patil, is discovered dead in a hotel room, sending shockwaves through the political landscape.
3	"Gurudakshina"	Abhijeet Panse	Abhijeet Panse; Amol Bhor	30 May 2022
Under mounting pressure, the Chief Minister of Maharashtra instructs the Joint Commissioner of Police to locate Ayesha. Faced with limited options, the Jt. CP is compelled to seek assistance from the suspended officer, Charudutt Mokashi, in a desperate bid to unravel the mystery.
4	"Moksha"	Abhijeet Panse	Abhijeet Panse; Amol Bhor	20 May 2022
As the search for Ayesha intensifies, the name of casting director Farooq surfaces. Despite relentless efforts, Mokashi finds himself unable to reach or apprehend Farooq in the pursuit of crucial information.
5	"Chakva"	Abhijeet Panse	Abhijeet Panse; Amol Bhor	30 May 2022
The suspense reaches a climax as Mokashi captures a waiter attempting to conceal a hidden camera in Ayesha's room, unraveling a colossal scandal that shakes the foundations of the unfolding mystery. The revelation adds a new layer of intrigue to the unfolding drama.
6	"Shodh"	Abhijeet Panse	Abhijeet Panse; Amol Bhor	30 May 2022
Under pressure, Sayajirao's family compels Mokashi to halt the investigation and close the case swiftly. Simultaneously, Sub-Inspector Palande uncovers intriguing evidence, adding a new twist to the unfolding narrative.
7	"Pita"	Abhijeet Panse	Abhijeet Panse; Amol Bhor	30 May 2022
S.I. Palande's discoveries prompt Raosaheb to urge Satish Naik to abandon the investigation, but Naik refuses. In a parallel effort, Mokashi establishes contact with Ayesha through her sister, Bina, weaving a complex web of intersecting paths in the unfolding story.
8	"Nirvan"	Abhijeet Panse	Abhijeet Panse; Amol Bhor	30 May 2022
Mokashi discovers Mokashi learns about Ayesha's history while investigating. At the same time, Raosaheb discovers evidence that might change the political situation in Maharashtra unexpectedly.
9	"Ghubad"	Abhijeet Panse	Abhijeet Panse; Amol Bhor	30 May 2022
Prerna Patil Sane assumes office as the new Chief Minister of Maharashtra, bringing a fresh dynamic to the political landscape. Meanwhile, in a significant turn, Mokashi uncovers buried evidence during the ongoing investigation, potentially reshaping the course of the narrative.
10	"RaanBaazaar"	Abhijeet Panse	Abhijeet Panse; Amol Bhor	30 May 2022
Mokashi deals with past hurts resurfacing, making things personal. The series wraps up with the Maharashtra government falling apart in a big finale.

== Production ==
=== Promotion ===
On 18 May 2022, Planet Marathi released the teaser for RaanBaazaar on YouTube and other social media platforms announcing the release of the series on 20 May 2022. It garnered 1 Million views in just one day. The show will consist of 10 episodes. It is one of the high budget web series of Marathi ever.

=== Success ===
It is one of the successful webseries of Marathi industry.

== Music ==
RaanBaazaar

Soundtrack album by AV Prafullachandra
- Released: 19 May 2022
- Genre: Web Series Music
- Language: Hindi
- Label: Planet Marathi

The song composed and written by AV Prafullachandra. Yeh Andheri Nagari was sung by Aanchal Tyagi and Kundi Lagalo sung Dr. Pallavi Shyam Sundar. Kundi Lagalo song is become popular in reels due to its Hindi lyrics.

Tracklist
No.	Title	Lyrics	Singer(s)	Length
1.	"Yeh Hai Andheri Nagari"	AV Prafullachandra	Aanchal Tyagi	2.18
2.	"Kundi Lagalo"	AV Prafullachandra	Dr. Pallavi Shyam Sundar	2.30
Total length:				4:48

== Reception ==
Upon release, Chitrali Chogale-Anavkar of Lokmat rated the show 4 out of 5 and said, "In short, the storm in politics created by the two ladies is definitely a must watch and equally entertaining. For Prajakta's acting, Abhijeet Panse's direction, a boldly different story and an entertaining experience, definitely watch 'Raanbazaar..."

Shaheen Irani from OTTplay reviewed that "Raanbaazaar finale is so worth the time it took. The episode comes a full circle, in a way that you would barely expect it to. It is not your happy ending kind of a show but the real elements and how everything is dealt with, is what makes this series so special. Watch this one without fail."

Salonee Mistry of Pune Mirror rated it 4 stars and stated that the series is clutter breaking and promises edges of the seat thriller and powerful performance.
