= Navardev Bsc. Agri. =

- Theatrical release poster
- Directed by: Ram Khatmode
- Written by: Ram Khatmode; Vinod Vanve
- Starring: Kshitij Date; Priyadarshini Indalkar
- Cinematography: Sanjivkumar Hilli
- Edited by: Vinay Shinde; Mayuresh Bavare
- Music by: Kunal–Karan; Rocksun; Chinar–Mahesh
- Production company: Aaryans Entertainment
- Distributed by: August Entertainment
- Release date: 26 January 2024
- Country: India
- Language: Marathi

Navardev Bsc. Agri. (transl. Groom Bsc. Agri.) is a 2024 Indian Marathi-language drama film directed and co-written by Ram Khatmode and produced by Aaryans Entertainment. The film stars Kshitij Date, Priyadarshini Indalkar in the leading roles while Makarand Anaspure, Pravin Tarde, Sandeep Pathak, Hardeek Joshi, Tanaji Galgunde in the supporting roles. The film centres on a young farmer Rajvardhan (Kshitij Date). After returning to the hamlet, he continues farming and helps other people grow more crops. He starts wooing ladies simultaneously, but because he is a farmer, he gets rejected.

The film was released on 26 January 2024 in theatres throughout Maharashtra.

== Plot ==
Rajvardhan is a young, intelligent farmer. Returning to the hamlet, he carries on farming and assists others in increasing their crops. He begins courting women concurrently, but is turned down since he is a farmer.

== Cast ==
- Kshitij Date as Rajvardhan "Raja"
- Priyadarshini Indalkar as Sukanya
- Makarand Anaspure as Bhausaheb, Raja's father
- Gargi Phule as Raja's mother
- Pravin Tarde as Nana
- Tanaji Galgunde as Sunny
- Hardeek Joshi as Mahadev, Police Sub–inspector
- Sandeep Pathak as marriage agent
- Neha Shitole as Raja's sister-in-law
- Vinod Vanve as Ganya
- Aniruddha Khutwad as Sukanya's father
- Sangeeta Kulkarni as Sukanya's mother
- Ramesh Pardeshi as Raja's brother

== Release ==
The film was theatrically released on 26 January 2024, coinciding Republic Day.

== Reception ==
Mihir Bhanage of The Times of India rated 2.5 stars out of 5 and wrote "Navardev Bsc. Agri is a genuine attempt at highlighting why farming and farmers shouldn't neglected, but it tries to pack in a lot in its running time, thereby not keeping the audience engaged throughout."

== Accolades ==
Year	Award	Category	Nominee (s)	Result	Ref.
2024	Aaryans Sanman	Best Supporting Actor	Makarand Anaspure	Nominated	
2024	Aaryans Sanman	Best Supporting Actress	Gargi Phule	Nominated	
2024	Aaryans Sanman	Best Music	Kunal–Karan	Nominated	
2024	Aaryans Sanman	Best Lyricist	Kunal–Karan, Ramchandra Khatmode	Nominated	
2024	Aaryans Sanman	Best Singer Male	Divya Kumar	Won	
2024	Aaryans Sanman	Best Singer Male	Rocksun	Nominated	
2024	City Cine Awards	Best Actress	Priyadarshini Indalkar	Nominated	
2024	City Cine Awards	Best Lyricist	Rocksun (song "Lal Chikhal")	Nominated	
2025	MaTa Sanman	Best Director	Ram Khatmode	Nominated	
2025	MaTa Sanman	Best Actress	Priyadarshini Indalkar	Nominated	
2025	MaTa Sanman	Best Supporting Actor	Makarand Anaspure	Nominated	
2025	MaTa Sanman	Best Screenplay	Ram Khatmode, Vinod Vanve	Nominated	
2025	Filmfare Awards Marathi	Best Actress	Priyadarshini Indalkar	Nominated	
2026	Maharashtra State Film Awards	Best Rural Film	Navardev Bsc. Agri.	Won	
2026	Maharashtra State Film Awards	Best Rural Film Director	Ram Khatmode	Won	
2026	Maharashtra State Film Awards	Best Lyricist	Rocksun (song "Lal Chikhal")	Won	
2026	Maharashtra State Film Awards	Best Dialogue	Ram Khatmode, Vinod Vanve	Won	
