= Nanda Saukhya Bhare =

2015 Indian Marathi language TV series

- Genre: Drama; Soap opera
- Story by: Sampada Jogalekar Kulkarni
- Directed by: Vaibhav Chinchalkar
- Starring: See below
- Country of origin: India
- Original language: Marathi
- No. of episodes: 389

Production
- Producer: Aadesh Bandekar
- Camera setup: Multi-camera
- Running time: 22 minutes
- Production company: Soham Productions

Original release
- Network: Zee Marathi
- Release: 20 July 2015 – 1 October 2016

Nanda Saukhya Bhare is an Indian Marathi language TV series that aired on Zee Marathi. The show premiered on 20 July 2015, replacing Ase He Kanyadan, and ended its run on 1 October 2018. It was produced by Aadesh Bandekar under the banner of Soham Productions. It starred Rutuja Bagwe, Chinmay Udgirkar and Suhas Paranjape in lead roles.

== Cast ==
=== Main ===
- Rutuja Bagwe as Swanandi Deshpande / Swanandi Indranil Jahagirdar
- Chinmay Udgirkar as Indranil Jahagirdar (Neel)
- Suhas Paranjape as Lalita Jahagirdar

=== Recurring ===
- Reshma Shinde as Sampada Deshpande
- Akshata Naik as Nilima Jahagirdar
- Sandeep Gaikwad as Niranjan Jahagirdar
- Varsha Dandale as Vatsala (Vachchhi)
- Uma Gokhale as Swanandi's mother
- Yogesh Soman as Swanandi's father
- Prajakta Gaikwad as Sayali Deshpande
- Samruddhi Salvi as Juilee Deshpande
- Vijay Patwardhan as Swanandi's uncle
- Rugvedi Pradhan as Swanandi's aunt
- Ragini Samant as Swanandi's grandmother

== Reception ==
=== Special episodes ===
==== 1 hour ====
- 30 August 2015
- 27 September 2015
- 25 October 2015
- 14 February 2016

==== 2 hours ====
- 13 December 2015 (Neel-Swanandi's marriage)

=== Ratings ===
Week	Year	BARC Viewership		Ref.
Week	Year	TRP	Rank	Ref.
Week 22	2016	1.5	2	
Week 23	2016	1.6	3	
Week 24	2016	1.6	5	
Week 28	2016	2.1	1	
Week 29	2016	2.2	1	
Week 31	2016	2.0	4	
Week 35	2016	2.3	3	
Week 38	2016	2.7	2	
