= Jyoti Chandekar =

Indian actress (1957–2025)

- Born: May 2, 1957
- Died: August 16, 2025 (aged 68)

Jyoti Chandekar (2 May 1957 – 16 August 2025) was an Indian actress.

== Career ==
Chandekar began acting at the age of 12 in the theatre. She worked primarily in Marathi theatre and film, including Mee Sindhutai Sapkal (2010), Dholki (2015) and Shyamchi Aai (2023).

She won the Maharashtra State Film Award for Best Supporting Actress in 1999 for her role in Gabhara. In 2015, she received a Zee Gaurav Award for Best Supporting Actress, alongside her daughter Tejaswini who won Best Actress for their roles in Ticha Umbartha. Chandekar won more than 200 awards in her career.

== Personal life and death ==
Chandekar was married to late Ranjit Pandit. She was the mother of actress Tejaswini Pandit and Poornima Pandit.

Chandekar died in Pune on 16 August 2025, at the age of 68.
