= Jayanti 2 =

Indian Marathi-language film

- Theatrical release poster
- Directed by: Shailesh Narwade
- Written by: Shailesh Narwade
- Starring: Ruturaj Wankhede; Priyadarshini Indalkar; Payal Jadhav
- Cinematography: Sanjivkumar Hilli
- Edited by: Faisal Mahadik
- Music by: Omkarswaroop; Background score: Mangesh Dhakde
- Production company: Meliorist Film Studio
- Distributed by: Sunshine Studios
- Release date: 11 September 2026
- Running time: 153 minutes
- Country: India
- Language: Marathi
- Budget: ₹3 crore
- Box office: ₹6.24 crore

Jayanti 2 is a 2026 Indian Marathi-language drama film directed and written by Shailesh Narwade and produced by Meliorist Film Studio. It is a sequel to the 2021 film Jayanti. The film follows a tribal college student who faces discrimination and is unjustly suspended, prompting a struggle against institutional bias, college politics and political pressure to restore her dignity and education. It stars Ruturaj Wankhede, Priyadarshini Indalkar and Payal Jadhav in the lead roles, while Rohini Hattangadi and Devika Daftardar appear in pivotal roles.

The film was theatrically released on 11 September 2026.

== Plot ==
A tribal student joins a college in Pune, where she faces discrimination from her classmates. After confronting the students over their treatment of her, she is suspended by the college administration. A former student and one of her college friends take up her case and campaign for her reinstatement and dignity. Their efforts bring them into conflict with the college administration, political influence and social prejudice. As they investigate the circumstances surrounding the suspension, they face pressure from various sections of the institution and society while attempting to expose the discrimination she has faced. Meanwhile, the student returns to her hometown and focuses on developing an innovative variety of rice. The struggle eventually becomes a wider fight against institutional discrimination, political interference and social inequality.

== Cast ==
- Ruturaj Wankhede as Santosh
- Priyadarshini Indalkar as Tanuja Shinde
- Payal Jadhav as Payal Markam
- Rohini Hattangadi as Principal Saraswati Tilak
- Devika Daftardar as Prof. Girija
- Vijay Nikam as Manohar Pant
- Kiran Kashinath as Prof. Hemant Mane
- Sharad Jadhav as Prof. Chavan
- Rajkumar Jarange as Pratap
- Mansi Subhash as Payal 's friend
- Nitin Bansode as Prof. Javed
- Yogini Pophale as Prof. Pratibha Thorat
- Shubham Gautam as Shubham
- Saurabh Biramwar as Saurabh
- Akshay Khobragade as Chhotu

== Production ==
The film was announced as a sequel to Jayanti. Ruturaj Wankhede, who appeared in the first film, reprises his role as Santya, while Priyadarshini Indalkar portrays the female lead.

The Central Board of Film Certification certified the film as UA 16+.

== Soundtrack ==
The music was composed by Onkarswaroop, while the background score was composed by Mangesh Dhakde.

Track listing
No.	Title	Lyrics	Singer(s)	Length
1.	"Rang Navya Natyacha"	Suhas Munde	Onkarswaroop	4:58
2.	"Ae Bhava"	Saurabh Guru	Onkarswaroop, Saurabh Salunke, Rajeshwari Pawar, Srujan Kulkarni, Nagesh Bhosekar, Manasee Dixit, Saurabh Guru	3:36
Total length:				8:34

== Release ==
The poster of the film featuring the three main leads was revealed in the first week of August 2026. The official trailer of Jayanti 2 was released on 1 September 2026, and the film was theatrically released on 11 September 2026.

=== Critical response ===
Anub George of The Times of India gave the film 3 out of 5 stars, observing, "Jayanti 2 stands strong in its topic and dialogue but wobbles in the execution of the scenes." Santosh Bhingarde of Sakal also gave the film 3 out of 5 stars, noting, "However, the pace of the film's story is somewhat slow. Nevertheless, this is a film that strongly raises the issue of reservation in the education sector while commenting on issues such as politics in the education system, caste discrimination, the relationship between teachers and students, discrimination in the education system, etc." Kalpeshraj Kubal of Maharashtra Times gave the film 3 out of 5 stars, stating, "However, no matter how important the subject, the film also fails at the level of dialogue writing and direction in giving it a full-fledged cinematic embodiment." He appreciated the screenplay. Reshma Raikwar of Loksatta commented, "Apart from these few crude links in the plot, there is no doubt that Shailesh Narwade has tackled an important subject."
