= Kurrr =

Play by Prasad Khandekar

- Official release poster
- Original title: कुर्रर्रर्रर्र
- Original language: Marathi
- Written by: Prasad Khandekar
- Music by: Amir Hadkar
- Lyrics by: Tejas Ranade
- Chorus: Gotya Sawant
- Characters: Akshar (husband); Pooja (wife); Vandana (mother)
- Subject: Family drama
- Genre: Comedy; Satyr

Premiere
- Directed by: Prasad Khandekar
- Original run: 150 minutes

Kurrr (subtitled with Yenar Yenar Ga; transl. Will definitely come) is a Marathi-language comedy theatre play written and directed by Prasad Khandekar. Produced by Vishakha Subhedar and Poonam Jadhav under the banner of V. R. Production, Pragyas Creations respectively.

The play was originally released on 4 December 2021 in theatres. Prasad Khandekar and Namrata Sambherao left the drama in 2023, replaced by Priyadarshan Jadhav and Mayura Ranade.

== Synopsis ==
Akshar, a writer, and his wife, Pooja, have been married for five years but have not been able to have a child. They live with Pooja’s mother, Vandana, whose husband left her years earlier; Vandana repeatedly pressures the couple about having a baby, while Pooja herself longs to become a mother. Amid the resulting domestic tension, a man known as “Paddy” enters the household, triggering a series of unexpected turns and comic complications.

== Characters ==
- Prasad Khandekar as Akshar
  - Replaced by Priyadarshan Jadhav
- Namrata Sambherao as Pooja
  - Replaced by Mayura Ranade
- Vishakha Subhedar as Vandana
- Pandharinth Kambale

== Crew ==
- Ulhesh Khandare – dress up
- Amogh Phadke – lighting
- Archana Thawre – costume

== Reception ==
Gayatri Devrukhkar of Rangbhoomi.com in its review wrote "The perfection of props and lighting are so beautifully matched that the beauty of the drama is increasing moment by moment."

A reviewer from Mumbai Tak wrote "Set Design of Bendre, Lighting of Amogh Phadke, and Music by Amir Hadkar are the soul of this play." Praised choreography called "excellent".

== Accolades ==
| Year | Award | Category | Nominee | Nominated work | Result | Ref(s) |
|---|---|---|---|---|---|---|
| 2023 | Zee Talkies Comedy Awards | Best Comedy Actress | Namrata Sambherao | Kurrr | Won | |
| 2023 | Zee Natya Gaurav Puraskar | Best Comedy Actress | Namrata Sambherao | Kurrr | Won | |
| 2023 | Zee Natya Gaurav Puraskar | Best Comedy Actress | Vishakha Subhedar | Kurrr | Won | |
| 2023 | Zee Natya Gaurav Puraskar | Best Music | Amir Hadkar | Kurrr | Won | |
