= Mee Sindhutai Sapkal =

- Film poster
- Directed by: Anant Mahadevan
- Screenplay by: Anant Mahadevan; Sanjay Pawar
- Produced by: Bindiya Khanolkar; Sachin Khanolkar
- Starring: Tejaswini Pandit; Jyoti Chandekar; Upendra Limaye; Neena Kulkarni
- Cinematography: K. Rajkumar
- Edited by: Anant Mahadevan
- Music by: Ashok Patki
- Release date: 30 October 2010 (South Asian Film Festival)
- Running time: 120 minutes
- Country: India
- Language: Marathi
- Budget: ₹1 crore

Mee Sindhutai Sapkal (trans. I Am Sindhutai Sapkal) is an Indian Marathi-language biographical film. It was directed by Anant Mahadevan. The film stars Tejaswini Pandit, Jyoti Chandekar, Upendra Limaye and Neena Kulkarni in leading roles.

== Plot ==
The film is a biographical account of Sindhutai Sapkal, a woman who became a social activist after a traumatic life. Born in a poor, cattle grazing family in Wardha as Chindi (Ragamuffin), Sindhutai was first married off at the age of 10 to a man who was 20 years elder to her and then abandoned by her husband on charges of infidelity.

Traveling through the backwaters of Maharashtra, Sindhutai never abandoned hope and courage and ended up in San Jose on a fund-raising mission for her orphanage, which still provides shelter to homeless kids.

== Cast ==
- Tejaswini Pandit as Sindhu (23 to 40 year old)
- Jyoti Chandekar as Sindhu (60 year old)
- Upendra Limaye as Shreehari Sapkal
- Neena Kulkarni as Bai

== Awards ==
Winner:

- National Film Award – Special Jury Award - Bindiya and Sachin Khanolkar, Anant Mahadevan
- National Film Award for Best Male Playback Singer - Suresh Wadkar
- National Film Award for Best Screenplay (Best Adapted Screenplay) - Anant Mahadevan, Sanjay Pawar
- National Film Award for Best Screenplay (Best Dialogues) - Sanjay Pawar
- Maharashtra State Film Award for Best Film
- MFK Award for Favourite Film
