= Candle March =

2014 Indian film

- Directed by: Sachin Deo
- Written by: Sachin Darekar
- Produced by: Anjali Thatte-Gawde; Nilesh Gawde
- Starring: Manva Naik; Smita Tambe; Tejaswini Pandit; Sayali Sahastrabuddhe
- Cinematography: Raja Satankar
- Edited by: Imran Mahadik
- Music by: Amitraj
- Release date: 5 December 2014
- Country: India
- Language: Marathi

Candle March is an Indian Marathi language film directed by Sachin Deo and produced by Anjali Thatte-Gawde and Nilesh Gawde. The film stars Manva Naik, Smita Tambe, Tejaswini Pandit and Sayali Sahastrabuddhe. The film was released on 5 December 2014.

== Synopsis ==
Inspired by true events, Candle March follows the struggles of four young women who were sexually harassed, charting out the events that connected and empowered them to fight injustice and a biased system.

== Cast ==
- Manva Naik as Vidya
- Smita Tambe as Shabana
- Tejaswini Pandit as Anurata
- Sayali Sahastrabuddhe as Sakshi
- Nilesh Diwekar
- Ashish Kulkarni
- Ashish Patode
- Chandrakant Lokare

== Soundtrack ==
Candle March

Soundtrack album by Amitraj
- Released: 2014
- Recorded: 2014
- Genre: Feature film soundtrack
- Length: 6:20
- Language: Marathi

Official audio
- Candle March – Full Album on YouTube

Track listing
No.	Title	Singer(s)	Length
1.	"Kahi Kelya"	Aanandi Joshi	1:37
2.	"Nikhare"	Shankar Mahadevan	1:38
3.	"Saher saher"	Adarsh Shinde	3:05
Total length:			6:20

== Critical response ==
Candle March received positive reviews from critics. Mihir Bhanage of The Times of India rated the film 3 out of 5 stars and says "Because of these two elements the film doesn’t feel lengthy. The final monologue by Tejaswini Pandit hits all the right chords and is worth pondering upon". Ganesh Matkari of Pune Mirror wrote "the film has a capacity to disturb and the issues are very real. For this fact, and this fact alone, I will not hesitate in recommending it". A reviewer from Divya Marathi wrote "The candle march at the end of the film is not given much importance. Even so, while presenting the sensitive topic forcefully, there is not only the empty optimism that the mentality of the society should be changed, but also the direction of what and what changes should be made". Soumitra Pote of Maharashtra Times rated the film 2.5 out of 5 stars and wrote "The overall effort for this film is sincere. Due to increase in length, it crawls in the middle. His behavior makes him very childish at times. One thing is for sure that this movie is not just entertaining. The film makes its point firmly".
