= Takatak (film) =

- Theatrical release poster
- Directed by: Milind Kavde
- Written by: Story and screenplay: Ajay Thakur; Milind Kavde; Dialogues: Sanjay Navgire
- Produced by: Om Prakash Bhatt; Sujay Shankarwar; Ravi Bahri; Inderjeet Singh; Ajay Thakur; Dhananjay Singh Masoom; Rabindra Choubey
- Starring: Prathamesh Parab; Ritika Shrotri; Abhijit Amkar; Pranali Bhalerao
- Cinematography: Hazarath Shaikh (Vali)
- Edited by: Pranav Patel
- Music by: Varun Likhate
- Production company: Purple Bull Entertainment
- Release date: 28 June 2019
- Running time: 144 minutes
- Country: India
- Language: Marathi
- Box office: ₹14.27 crore

Takatak is a 2019 Indian Marathi-language adult comedy film directed by Milind Kavde and produced by Purple Bull Entertainment. The film starring Prathamesh Parab, Ritika Shrotri, Abhijit Amkar and Pranali Bhalerao in the leading roles. The film was a commercial success grossed over ₹14.27 crore (US$1.5 million) in three weeks.

== Plot ==
Calm and experienced Kamakshi's marriage to a porn addict and Minakshi's involvement in a romantic triangle set her and her wild and impetuous younger sister on a roller coaster trip.

== Cast ==
- Prathamesh Parab as Ganya
- Ritika Shrotri as Minakshi
- Abhijit Amkar as Chandu
- Pranali Bhalerao as Kamakshi
- Milind Bhagwat as Kamakshi's father
- Vassu Bhagwat as Vashya
- Umesh Bolke as Ganya's father
- Bharat Ganeshpure as Chandu's father
- Ananda Karekar as Dinesh
- Sanket Korlekar as Aditya
- Vijaya Mahajan as Chandu's mother
- Prabhakar More as Baban
- Narendra Mudholkar as Government officer 2
- Pragati Naik as Dinesh's wife
- Shubhda Naik as Ganya's mother
- Sanjay Navgire as Government officer 1
- Achala Panchal as Chandu's grandmother
- Akash Patel as Pitya

== Release ==
The film was theatrically released on 28 June 2019 throughout Maharashtra.

== Critical reception ==
Mihir Bhanage of The Times of India said, "Takatak has more dreambaks than plus points. The climax (no pun intended) comedy with a message of taking it easy and not jumping the gun (again, no pun intended) when it comes to physical relationships. But it build up is a task to endure, unless you are a fan of this genre". A reviewer from Just Marathi wrote "The film is not suitable for a watch to watch as it has a number of third-grade double meaning humor, which remains the part and parcel of the story".

== Soundtrack ==
Track listing
No.	Title	Lyrics	Music	Singer (s)	Length
1.	"Aapla Haat Jagannath"	Jai Atre	Varun Likhate	Anand Shinde	3:18
2.	"Ye Chandrala"	Jai Atre	Varun Likhate	Shruti Rane	4:23

== Sequel ==
The sequel of the film Takatak 2 was released on 28 August 2022.
