= Angarki =

- Theatrical release poster
- Directed by: Chandrakant Dudhgaokar
- Written by: Sanjay Pawar
- Starring: Makarand Anaspure; Tejaswini Pandit; Gargi Patel; Sharad Ponkshe
- Music by: Harsshit Abhiraj
- Release date: 13 December 2013
- Country: India
- Language: Marathi

Angarki is a 2013 Indian Marathi-language directed by Chandrakant Dudhgaonkar, Starring Makarand Anaspure, Tejaswini Pandit And Sharad Ponkshe. It was theatrically released on 13 December 2013.

== Cast ==
- Makarand Anaspure
- Tejaswini Pandit
- Gargi Patel
- Sharad Ponkshe
- Sameer Deshpande
- Sadeep Gaikwad
- Avtar Gill
- Narayan Jadhav
- Sanjay Mohite
- Anil Nagarkar
- Swapnil Rajshekhar
- Vilas Rakte
- Deepak Rege,
- Dr. Vilas Ujawane
- Dharmesh Yelande
- Avinash Mohite

== Production ==
Principal photography began on 21 May 2013. The shoot wrapped up on 7 June 2013

== Reception ==
A reviewer of Loksatta wrote "It can only be said that Makarand Anaspure, Tejaswini Pandit and Avtar Gill in the lead roles have played unimaginative and not detailed characters in the plot. This attempt of the writers-directors to discuss the issue of secularism has to be said to be a total waste". Jaydip Pathakji from Maharashtra Times wrote "Sanjay Pawar should be congratulated for writing a good film. However, we should also keep in mind that a film that is strong on paper is not always strong on screen".
