= Lochya Zaala Re =

- Theatrical release poster
- Directed by: Paritosh Painter
- Based on: Pati Sagle Uchapati by Suresh Jairam
- Produced by: Paritosh Painter; Shantaram Manve; Nitin Keni; Naveen Chandra
- Starring: Ankush Chaudhari; Siddhartha Jadhav; Vaidehi Parashurami; Sayaji Shinde; Vijay Patkar; Prasad Khandekar
- Cinematography: Sanjay K. Memane
- Edited by: Nilesh Gavand
- Music by: Chinar–Mahesh
- Production companies: Ideas The Entertainment Company; Mumbai Movie Studios Pvt. Ltd.
- Distributed by: UFO Moviez
- Release date: 4 February 2022
- Country: India
- Language: Marathi

Lochya Zala Re is a 2022 Indian Marathi-language drama film directed by the duo Paritosh Painter and Ravi Adhikari based on Suresh Jairam's play Pati Sagle Uchapati. The film stars Ankush Chaudhari, Siddhartha Jadhav, Vaidehi Parashurami, Sayaji Shinde, Vijay Patkar. It was theatrically released on 4 February 2022.

The entire shooting of the film has been held in London, the film was released in the Indian states of Maharashtra, Goa, Gujarat, Delhi and at the same time internationally in United States, UAE, Canada, and Australia. The film received mixed reviews from critics.

== Plot ==
In order to increase his allowance, Aditya, who settled in Birmingham has written to his uncle staying in Satara, that he is married although he is a bachelor. One-day uncle drops in unexpectedly in Birmingham. And Aditya is drawn into the vertex of intrigue when Uncle mistakes Pooja, Aditya's Best friend Manav's wife, as Aditya's wife & the neighbor's Ruby as Manav's wife. Aditya is basically honest and does not wish to deceive his uncle but.. does he have a choice. The Uncle is impressed by Pooja and also decides to steps up Aditya's allowance for choosing a pretty & sweet girl like Pooja to be his wife. Uncle also promises Pooja that he will step up the allowance further if they have a baby. This leaves Aditya with no choice but to carry on this act, very much to Manav Patel's discomfort.

Further complications arise when Ruby, the neighbor PK's wife drops in at the house, and Uncle mistakes her for Manav's wife. Complications keep tumbling when the nightfall's, and it's time to retire. Who goes to bed with whom? Manav is irked when Aditya suggests that since the Uncle is home, he (Aditya) will have to spend the night with Pooja and is further annoyed when he (Manav) has to spend the night in the Maid's room.

The situation reaches its climax when Uncle nearly catches Manav sneaking into Aditya & Pooja's room. But the plot becomes more hilarious when the next-door drunkard neighbor P.K. drops in the bed with Uncle and is mistaken for someone else. The indescribable confusion that follows builds into a rich complexity of mistaken identities, splendid farcical situations, and a climax of comic wizardry.

From here on the permutations become so intricate that it seems impossible that Aditya, Pooja & Manav can ever sort them out. But miraculously they do, so hilariously that the audience will keep rolling with laughter till the movie ends. A fast, funny plot makes this rip-roaring farce easy & enjoyable for the entire family.

== Cast ==
- Ankush Chaudhari as Aditya (Adi) Ghorpade
- Siddhartha Jadhav as Maanav
- Vaidehi Parashurami as Dimple/Pooja
- Sayaji Shinde as Shambhunath Ghorpade (Kaka)
- Vijay Patkar as Dimple's father
- Resham Tipnis as Ruby
- Prasad Khandekar as Sandy

== Production ==
It is an adaptation of the Suresh Jairam's play 'Pati Sagle Uchapati'. The entire film has been shot in London. It is produced by Mumbai Movie Studios, Idea The Entertainment Company and Abhinaya Mumbai Productions, and distributed by UFO Moviez.

== Release ==
=== Theatrical ===
The film was theatrically released on 4 February 2022. Released in Maharashtra, Goa, Gujarat, Delhi domestically and USA, Canada, UAE and Australia abroad.

=== Home media ===
The digital streaming rights of the film was acquired by Amazon Prime Video and it was premiered on 1 April 2022.

== Reception ==
=== Critical reception ===
Preeti Atulkar of The Times of India rates 3.5 out of 5 praised editing, songs, performances while founded errors in comedy sequences. Kalpeshraj Kubal of Maharashtra Times gave 3 stars while Keyur Seta of Cinestaan gave 2 stars out of 5 and gave mixed response.

=== Box office ===
The film collected ₹0.29 crore (US$30,000) on its opening day. In 10 days film crossed ₹6.31 crore (US$660,000) in India.
