= Planet Marathi OTT =

Marathi OTT platform

- Company type: OTT platform
- Available in: Marathi; English
- Founded: 2021
- Headquarters: Mumbai, Maharashtra, India
- Area served: 100+ countries
- Owner: Planet Marathi Group
- Founders: Akshay Bardapurkar; Soumya Vilekar
- Key people: Akshay Bardapurkar (CEO); Aditya Oke (COO)
- Industry: Entertainment
- Products: Streaming media; Video on demand; Digital distribution
- Total assets: ₹200 crore
- Subsidiaries: Planet Bharat; Planet Goem
- Website: planetmarathi.com
- Commercial: Yes
- Registration: Optional
- Users: 1 million (January 2024)
- Current status: Active

Planet Marathi OTT is an Indian subscription video on-demand over-the-top streaming media service which is India's first digital platform provide content in Marathi. Planet Marathi claims to have over 550,000 installs and over 24 million video plays since its launch.

Planet Marathi had appointed Marathi actress Mrinal Kulkarni to its board of founders. Director of content, Abhijit Panse, was appointed by the company.

In November 2023, the Planet Marathi Group and Vistas Media announced the launch of Planet Bharat, an over-the-top platform. The company had also launched a news vertical and a Konkani-language digital entertainment platform, Planet Goem. Soumya and her son, Anitya Vilekar, who held positions as directors within the company, have stepped down in 2024 from their roles on the board of directors.

== Launch ==
The platform was launched in Mumbai by Madhuri Dixit in the presence of popular Marathi film personalities including Amruta Khanvilkar, Tejaswini Pandit, Sanjay Jadhav, Sonalee Kulkarni, Prasad Oak, Siddharth Jadhav.

== Availability ==
The platform is available on Android, and iOS worldwide.
