= Maharashtra's Best Dancer =

- Also known as: MBD
- Genre: Dance; Reality Television
- Presented by: Sankarshan Karhade; Namrata Sambherao
- Judges: Dharmesh Yelande; Pooja Sawant
- Country of origin: India
- Original language: Marathi
- No. of episodes: 31

Production
- Producers: Hemant Ruprell; Ranjeet Thakur
- Running time: 60 Minutes
- Production company: Frames Production

Original release
- Network: Sony Marathi
- Release: 30 November 2020 – 14 March 2021

Maharashtra's Best Dancer is the Marathi-language version of the reality television programme India's Best Dancer and the show aired on Sony Marathi. Actress Pooja Sawant and Choreographer Dharmesh Yelande are the Judges and the hosts are Sankarshan Karhade and Namrata Sambherao. Prathamesh Mane is the winner of season 1.

== Concept ==
Maharashtra's Best Dancer will showcase the people of some of the best dancing talent, who with their solo performances, will compete to win the show. In the Grand Premiere, the judges announced the Top 14 contestants who will have a respective mentor in the journey ahead. Week-on-week these 14 contestants will have to impress the judges and audience alike to move closer to winning the most coveted title of Maharashtra's Best Dancer.

== Top 13 contestants ==
Contestants	City	Choreographers	Status	Date of Elimination
Prathamesh Mane	Satara	Akash Shetty	Won	—
Prachi Prajapati	Nagpur	Shweta Warrier	1st Runner-up	—
Apeksha Londhe	Pune	Ashutosh Pawar	2nd Runner-up	—
Aditi Jadhav	Mumbai	Rutuja Junnarkar	3rd Runner-up	—
Arya Dongre	Pune	Pratiksha Sutar	Eliminated	2 March 2021
Shweta Tukrul	Mumbai	Vaibhav Ghuge	Eliminated	23 February 2021
Sameep Dhakne	Mumbai	Rupesh Soni	Eliminated	16 February 2021
Akash Tambedkar	Mumbai	Sagar Bora	Eliminated	26 January 2021
Deepak Hulsure	Latur	Bharat Ghare	Eliminated	26 January 2021
Shweta Kadam	Mumbai	Swapnil Mandavkar	Eliminated	19 January 2021
Shubham Revankar	Mumbai	Ajinkya Kalokhe	Eliminated	5 January 2021
Chinmay Borkar	Goa	Rutuja Parekh	Eliminated	29 December 2020
Mansi Sharma	Nagpur	Minakshi Poshe	Eliminated	22 December 2020

== Guests ==
Date	Guest	Featured	Ref.
21-22 December	Govinda	Guest appearance	
11-12 January	Ankush Chaudhari	Guest appearance	
8-9 February	Remo D'Souza	Through Video Call	
15-16 February	Amol Kolhe	For Shivaji Maharaj Jayanti	
22-23 February	Vishakha Subhedar, Arun Kadam, Namrata Sambherao	Marriage Week Special	
8-9 March	Geeta Kapoor	For Women's Day	
Grand Finale	Sachin Pilgaonkar, Supriya Pilgaonkar	Guest appearance	

== Judges and hosts ==
Judges of Maharashtra's best dancer are:

- Dharmesh Yelande
- Pooja Sawant

Hosts of Maharashtra's best dancer are:

- Sankarshan Karhade
- Namrata Sambherao
