= Songya =

- Directed by: Milind Inamdar
- Written by: Dipak Yadav
- Produced by: Nishant Kakirde; Rahul Patil
- Starring: Rutuja Bagwe; Ajinkya Nanaware; Ganesh Yadav; Anil Gawas; Aparna Kakirde; Dipali Jadhav; Pradeep Doiphode; Yogesh Chikatgaokar
- Cinematography: Arvind Kumar
- Edited by: Nilesh Gawand
- Music by: Vijay Narayan Gavande
- Production company: Nirami Films
- Release date: 15 December 2023
- Country: India
- Language: Marathi

Songya is a 2023 Indian Marathi-language film based on real events in modern India. It is directed by Milind Inamdar and produced by Nirami Films. It features Rutuja Bagwe, Ajinkya Nanaware, Ganesh Yadav, Anil Gawas, Aparna Kakirde, Pradeep Doiphode, Dipali Jadhav, and Yogesh Chikatgaokar. Vijay Narayan Gavande composed music for the film and Guru Thakur wrote the lyrics for songs.

== Plot ==
The film is presented as based on real-life events in modern India. Shubhra is a well-educated young girl, who financially supports her poor parents and family. She falls in love with Yashraj. As their relationship deepens, they decide to get married. Yashraj is also well-educated in London and is from a wealthy political family. By age-old traditions, the marriage proposal gets finalized in the presence of village leaders who want to make sure all religious and cultural traditions are followed. Both families agree on almost all conditions, except one that Shubhra opposes, a Virginity Test! A bride, on the first night after the wedding, must prove to society that she is a virgin. Her opposition to the test puts her against powerful village leaders, who ostracize her family. After a lot of suffering, she decides to stand up to them and educate villagers to drop this and many other oppressive traditions against women with the help of "Songi Bharud", a live street performance on social issues.

== Cast ==
- Rutuja Bagwe as Shubhra
- Ajinkya Nanaware as Yash
- Ganesh Yadav as Bhau Saheb
- Aparna Kakirde as Tai Saheb
- Anil Gawas as Ramdev
- Pradeep Doiphode as Sar Panch
- Deepali Jadhav as Sareeta
- Yogesh Chikatgaokar as Devaa

== Reception ==
Virat Verma from FlickonClick rate 3.5 out of 5 and wrote "Songya is a thought-provoking Marathi film that tackles relevant social issues with sincerity and courage. Rutuja Bagwe's compelling performance, supported by Ajinkya Nanaware and directed by Milind Inamdar, elevates the film to a level that not only entertains but also leaves a lasting impact. Its a commendable cinematic endeavor that encourages dialogue and reflection on the winds of change sweeping through modern India."

Film Information was very critical of most aspects in the film.
