= Vishakha Subhedar =

Indian actress

- Born: 22 March 1976 (age 50); Thane, Maharashtra, India
- Occupations: Actor; comedian
- Spouse: Mahesh Subhedar (m. 1998)
- Children: 1

Comedy career
- Medium: television, film
- Genres: character comedy; Satire
- Subjects: Bollywood; Marathi cinema; everyday life; Indian culture; popular culture; Marathi television

Vishakha Subhedar (born 22 March 1976) is a Marathi television and film actress. She is known as a comedian, particularly when working in commercial Marathi cinema and drama. She began her acting career in 2004, when she started acting in dramas. She is well known for her roles in Fu Bai Fu & Maharashtrachi Hasyajatra.

== Early life ==
Subhedar was originally from Thane, Maharashtra. She went into New English High School, Thane.

Before finding success as an actress, she worked several other small jobs to support her early career. She was a dance teacher, as well as saleswoman for items such as dress material, nail paint, lipstick, etc.

== Personal life ==
She is married to Mahesh Subhedar since 1998, who is an engineer, dubbing artist as well as actor. They meet during the filming of the natak - Kaksparsh. They also have a son named, Abhinay. For now, she lives in Mulund.

== Filmography ==
=== Films ===
Year	Title	Role	Ref.
2007	Premat Sarech Kahi Maaf		
2008	Bhagam Bhaag	Madam	
2009	Harishchandrachi Factory	Prostitute's mother	
2011	Guldasta		
2011	Fakta Ladh Mhana	Munnibai	
2011	Mast Challay Amcha	Seema	
2012	Yedyanchi Jatra	Anna Patil's wife	
2012	4 Idiots	Shevanta	
2013	Sasubai Gelya Chorila	Ashatai Deodhar	
2013	Are Avaaj Konacha	Tai	
2013	Balak-Palak	Pednekar Kaku	
2013	Zapatlela 2	Champabai	
2013	Thenga		
2014	Super Nani	Ratna	
2015	Dagadabaichi Chawl	Dagadabai	
2015	Sasu Cha Swayamwar	Lalitabai	
2016	1234	Swati Joshi	
2016	Madhu Ithe Ani Chandra Tithe	Madhu's mother	
2017	Hrudayantar	Mrs. Aaglawe	
2018	Ye Re Ye Re Paisa	Ranjana	
2018	Maska	Special appearance	
2019	66 Sadashiv		
2019	Ye Re Ye Re Paisa 2	Ranjana	
2022	Garam Kitali		
2022	Ladoo Ghya Ladoo	Tanu 's mother	
2022	Eka Kaleche Mani	Kale's neighbour	
2023	Ekda Yeun Tar Bagha	Magru	
2024	Panipuri	Maya's mother	
2025	Hardik Shubhechha	Madhav's mother	
2025	Ye Re Ye Re Paisa 3	Ranjana	
2025	Well Done Aai	Shakuntala Mane	

=== Television ===
Year	Title	Role	Ref.
2004	Boogie Woogie	Contestant	
2009-2010	Man Udhan Varyache	Manorama	
2010-2014	Fu Bai Fu	Contestant	
2011	Comedy Circus Ka Naya Daur	Contestant	
2012-2014	Ambat Goad	Daya Vidhwans	
2013-2014	Shejari Shejari Pakke Shejari	Lajwanti (Lajjo)	
2014-2016	Ka Re Durava	Nandini	
2016-2017	Comedychi Bullet Train	Contestant	
2017	Assa Sasar Surekh Baai	Bakula	
2018-2022	Maharashtrachi Hasyajatra	Contestant	
2018-2019	Saare Tujhyachsathi	Shruti's aunt	
2020	Aathashe Khidkya Naushe Dare	Mrs. Saave	
2020	Maharashtra's Best Dancer	Cameo appearance	
2022	Bus Bai Bas	Herself	
2023–2026	Shubhvivah	Ragini Patwardhan	

== Stage works ==
Year	Title	Role
2016	Shantecha Karta Chalu Ahe	Shanta
2019	Yancha Karaycha Kay	Mangal Jadhav
2021	Kurrr	Vandana
2025	The Damyanti Damle	Damyanti Damle
