= Phulrani =

- Theatrical release poster
- Directed by: Vishwas Joshi
- Written by: Guru Thakur; Vishwas Joshi
- Produced by: Jaee Joshi; A Rao; Swanand Kelkar
- Starring: Subodh Bhave; Priyadarshini Indalkar; Vaishnavi Andhale; Vikram Gokhale; Ashwini Kulkarni
- Cinematography: Kedar Gaikwad
- Edited by: Guru Patil; Mahesh Killekar
- Music by: Nilesh Moharir; Varun Likhate
- Production companies: Fincraft Media; Amruta Films; Third Ace Entertainment
- Distributed by: Viacom18 Studios
- Release date: 22 March 2023
- Country: India
- Language: Marathi

Phulrani (subtitled onscreen with Avismarniya Prem Kahani; transl. An Unforgettable Love Story) is a 2023 Indian Marathi-language romantic film co-written and directed Vishwas Joshi. The film is jointly produced by Amruta Films, Third Ace Entertainment and Fincraft Media, it is distributed by Viacom18 Studios. Subodh Bhave and Priyadarshini Indalkar in lead roles. The film is a remake of the 1964 American musical comedy drama My Fair Lady, which is itself an adaptation of the 1913 play Pygmalion. It was theatrically released on 22 March 2023.

== Cast ==
- Subodh Bhave as Vikram Rajadhyaksha
- Priyadarshini Indalkar as Shevanta Tandel alias Phulrani
- Milind Shinde as Hanmya/Phulrani's Father
- Ashwini Kulkarni as Megha
- Gaurav Ghatnekar as Dhruv
- Gaurav Malankar as Pintya
- Vikram Gokhale as Brigadier
- Shushant Shelar as Saurabh
- Dipali Jadhav as Sumi
- Vaishnavi Andhale as Riya
- Sayali Sanjeev in guest appearance

== Release ==
=== Theatrical ===
Phulrani was theatrically released on 22 March 2023 coinciding Gudi Padwa.

=== Home media ===
The film is available for streaming on OTT platform Amazon Prime Video.

== Soundtrack ==
Phulrani

Soundtrack album by Nilesh Moharir and Varun Likhate
- Released: 2023
- Genre: Feature film soundtrack
- Length: 24:12
- Language: Marathi
- Label: Zee Music Company

Official audio
- Phulrani - Full Album on YouTube

Track listing
No.	Title	Lyrics	Music	Singer (s)	Length
1.	"Beautiful Rani"	Mandar Cholkar	Varun Likhate	Avdhoot Gupte, Aanandi Joshi	4:37
2.	"Hirve Hirve"	Balkavi (Tryambak Bapuji Thombare)	Nilesh Moharir	Vaishali Samant	3:39
3.	"Tuzya Sobatiche"	Guru Thakur	Nilesh Moharir	Swapnil Bhandodkar, Anandi Joshi	5:45
4.	"Chadhavila Patta Kamarevari"	Guru Thakur	Nilesh Moharir	Priyanka Barve, Sharayu Date	4:23
5.	"Hirve Hirve (male version)"	Balkavi (Tryambak Bapuji Thombare)	Nilesh Moharir	Hrishikesh Ranade	3:40
Total length:					24:12

== Reception ==
Reshma Raikwar of Loksatta wrote: "There aren't a lot of songs, even though it is a love story, there is only one soft and catchy song like 'Tujya Sobtiche'. This film is a love story that will entertain you".

Devendra Jadhav of Sakal wrote: "Even though everyone has tried to increase the glory of Phulrani by making sincere efforts in acting, something seems to be missing. Overall, there is no doubt that Priyadarshini–Subodh's Phulrani directed by Vishwas Joshi is definitely worth watching once".

Kalpeshraj Kubal of The Times of India wrote: "Though it may not have hit the bull's eye, Phulrani has an engaging story, melodious music and impactful performances that make for a good watch this week."
