= Anant Jog =

Indian actor

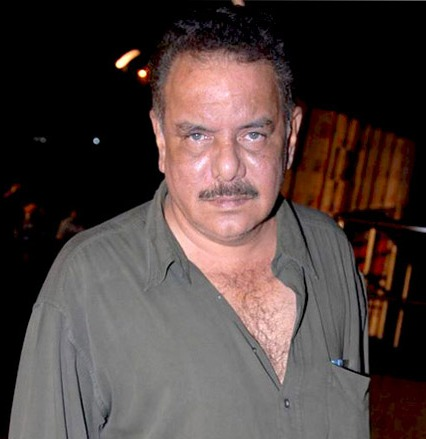
- Jog in 2011
- Born: India
- Occupation: Actor
- Years active: 1988–present
- Spouse: Ujwala Jog
- Children: Kshitee Jog (daughter)
- Family: Jog family

Anant Jog is an Indian film and television actor who acts in Hindi and Marathi films.

== Personal life ==
Jog's daughter, Kshitee Jog, is an actress.

== Filmography ==
Key
†	Denotes films that have not yet been released

=== Films ===
Year	Film name	Role	Notes
1988	Andha Yudh	Sub Inspector	
1991	Saathi	Ragpicker and father of Suraj	Special appearance at the beginning of the movie
1992	Zindagi Ek Juaa	Lobo	
1992	Jaanam		
1993	Hasti	Dr Vinay	
1994	Vijaypath	Bhavani Singh	
1994	Teesra Kaun	Gangster	Special appearance
2002	Lal Salaam		
2003	Waisa Bhi Hota Hai Part II	Ganpat	
2004	Garv: Pride & Honour	Munna Trivedi	
2005	Sarkar	Commissioner	
2006	Kachchi Sadak	Paswan	
2007	Risk	Home Minister Sarang	
2007	Dahek: A Restless Mind	Iqbal Khan	
2010	Khatta Meetha	Ramakant's brother-in-law	
2010	Benny and Babloo	Ratnath Gaikwad	
2011	Lady Dabangg Aaj Bbhi		
2011	Singham	Minister Anant Narvekar	
2012	Aakhari Decision	Commissioner Shyam Singh	
2012	Rowdy Rathore	Minister	Hindi
2012	Shanghai	Jagannath Koli alias Jaggu	
2012	No Entry Pudhe Dhoka Aahey	Minister Kawle	Marathi film
2019	Marjaavaan	Mr. Gaitonde	
2021	Jhimma	Vasantrao. Konde-Patil	Guest appearance in Marathi film
2022	Adrushya	Shreya's Father	Marathi Film
2023	Marathi Paul Padate Pudhe		Marathi film
2023	Jhimma 2	Vasantrao Konde-Patil	Marathi Film
2024	KarmaVirayan		Marathi film
2025	Romeo S3	Leeladhar Sawant	
2026	Krantijyoti Vidyalay Marathi Madhyam	Jagtap	Marathi Film
2026	Cup Bashi	Sudesh Bhosle	Marathi Film

=== Television ===
Year	Serial	Role	Channels	notes
Unknown	Kuchh Khoya Kuchh Paaya	Vyanku Bhauji	DD National	
1994	Dard	Amritram Ji	DD National	
1995	Aahat		SET India	Multiple Characters in various episodes (Seasons 1 and 2)
1997	Shaktimaan		DD National	
1997	Sea Hawks	Pinto	DD Metro	All Seasons
1999	Star Bestsellers			
2003	Vadalvaat	Maharav	Alpha TV Marathi	
2007	Ssshhhh...Phir Koi Hai	Riya & Sunny's father (episode 54)	Star One	
2013	Gandh Phulancha Gela Sangun	Thorle Bhau Sarkar	ETV Marathi	
2022	Aboli	Devdatta Khandkekar	Star Pravah	
2026	Tarini	Bapurao Jamkhande	Zee Marathi	

=== Web series ===
Year	Serial	Role	Notes
2022	RaanBaazaar	Joint CP Raosaheb	
2025	Black, White & Gray - Love Kills		
