= Tejaswini Lonari =

Indian actress

- Born: September 16, 1989 (age 37); Nashik, Maharashtra
- Education: Business of Film Making & Television; Masters in English Literature
- Alma mater: Kishore Namit Kapoor Acting Institute,New Delhi; Pune University
- Occupation: Actress
- Years active: 2005–present
- Known for: Bigg Boss Marathi 4
- Spouse: Samadhan Sarvankar (m. 2025)

Tejaswini Lonari is an Indian film and television actress. She made her film debut with No Problem. She made her television debut with Chittod Ki Rani Padmini Ka Johur as Padmini. She has participated in Bigg Boss Marathi 4 as a contestant.

== Personal life ==
On 27 October 2025, she engaged with Shivsena Youth Leader Samadhan Sarvankar son of Sada Sarvankar.

== Early career ==
Kedar Shinde's brother, Mandar Shinde, collaborated with her for the first film, "No Problem," when she was just 16 in the 2007-08 period. During a photoshoot with Atul Sidhaye, they suggested she try acting. In her debut film, she played the heroine opposite Jitendra Joshi. Trained in acting at Kishore Namit Kapoor Acting School, the initial opportunity was rewarding. However, sustaining success proved challenging. While her first film was well-received, subsequent ones faced difficulties. The movie "Doghat Tisra Aata Sagla Visara" brought some success, and even today, people recognize her as a missed gem in the film industry. Despite a good start, the journey ahead appears uncertain, with no promising projects on the horizon.

== Filmography ==
Key
| † | Denotes films that have not yet been released |

=== Films ===
| Year | Title | Role | Ref. |
|---|---|---|---|
| 2005 | No Problem | Sunanda | |
| 2008 | Madhu Ithe Ani Choughe Tithe | Madhu | |
| 2008 | Baap Re Baap Dokyala Taap | Yuvraj's love interest | |
| 2008 | Doghat Tisra Ata Sagla Vista | Chitra | |
| 2011 | Guldasta | Janhavi | |
| 2012 | Chinu | Chinu | |
| 2015 | Wanted Bayko No. 1 | Neha | |
| 2015 | Saam Daam Dand Bhed | Daulatrao's daughter-in-law | |
| 2016 | Bernie | Bernie | |
| 2023 | Aflatoon | Inspector Alia Sawant | |
| 2023 | Chhapa Kata | Shanaya | |
| TBA | Kalaawati† | Neha | |

=== Television ===
| Year | Title | Role | Language | Ref. |
|---|---|---|---|---|
| 2009 | Chittod Ki Rani Padmini Ka Johur | Rani Padmini | Hindi | |
| 2022 | Devmanus 2 | MLA Devyani Gaikwad | Marathi | |
| 2022 | Bigg Boss Marathi 4 | Contestant (Quit on Day 58) | Marathi | |
| 2023–2024 | Tuzech Mi Geet Gaat Aahe | Monica Rajadhyaksha Kamat | Marathi | |

=== Music video ===
| Year | Title | Singer | Ref. |
|---|---|---|---|
| 2018 | Shy Mora Saiyyan | Monali Thakur and Piyush Mehroliya | |
