= Chhapa Kata =

- Theatrical release poster
- Directed by: Sandeep Navre
- Written by: Sandeep Navre; Prakash Bhagwat
- Produced by: Sushilkumar Agarwal
- Starring: Makarand Anaspure; Mohan Joshi; Arun Nalawade; Vijay Patkar; Tejaswini Lonari; Reena Madhukar
- Cinematography: Gaurav Ponkshe
- Edited by: Minal Mhadnak
- Music by: Gaurav Chati; Mukul Kashikar; Ganesh Surve
- Production company: Ultra Media & Entertainment
- Release date: 15 December 2023
- Running time: 134 minutes
- Country: India
- Language: Marathi

Chhapa Kata (transl. Heads and Tails) is a 2023 Indian Marathi-language comedy drama film co-written and directed by Sandeep Navre and produced by Ultra Media & Entertainment. The film stars Makarand Anaspure, Mohan Joshi, Tejaswini Lonari, Reena Madhukar, Vijay Patkar, Arun Nalawade.

== Cast ==
- Makarand Anaspure as Namdev "Namya"
- Mohan Joshi as Shanaya's grandfather
- Arun Nalawade as the friend of Shanaya's grandfather
- Vijay Patkar as Sameer's maternal uncle
- Tejaswini Lonari as Shanaya
- Reena Madhukar as Archana
- Smita Oak as Namdev's mother
- Ruturaj Phadke as Sameer
- Pankaj Vishnu as Raaj, Shanaya's friend
- Sushrut Mankani as Rahul
- Jairaj Nair as Sameer's father
- Urmila Dange
- Prakash Bhagwat as brothers-in-law of Namdev
- Sandeep Gaikwad as brothers-in-law of Namdev
- Sunayana Kadam
- Pratibha Bhosale
- Ashutosh Wadekar as Ganpat

== Release ==
=== Theatrical ===
The trailer was released on 24 November 2023 and the film was released on 15 December 2023 in theatres throughout Maharashtra.

=== Home media ===
The film is available for streaming on OTT platform Ultra Jhakass.

== Reception ==
=== Critical response ===
Kalpeshraj Kubal of Maharashtra Times rated 2.5 stars out of 5 and wrote "On the silver screen we are watching a drama full of melodrama; Chhapa Kata which gives such an experience is somewhat different from the recent Marathi movies." Film Information opinioned that "Sandeep Manohar Naware's direction is ordinary. Music is nothing to shout about and the same goes for the lyrics. Mukul Kashikar's background music ought to have been better. Gaurav Ponkshe's camerawork is average. Meenal Rakesh Mhadnak's editing is loose."

== Soundtrack ==
The song "Man He Guntale" released on 29 November 2023, sung by Sunidhi Chauhan. The title track "Chhapa Kata" was released on 6 December 2023, sung by Adarsh Shinde. The music of the song has been directed by Gaurav Chati and the lyrics was written by Shivam Barpande.

Track listing
No.	Title	Lyrics	Music	Singer(s)	Length
1.	"Man He Guntale"	Shivam Barpande	Gaurav Chati	Sunidhi Chauhan	2:52
2.	"Chhapa Kata (title track)"	Shivam Barpande	Gaurav Chati	Adarsh Shinde	3:23
3.	"Kuni Samjava Majhya Manala"	Meghana Gore	Mukul Kashikar	Abhay Jodhpurkar, Aarya Ambekar	2:34
