= Ekda Yeun Tar Bagha =

2023 Marathi film directed by Prasad Khandekar

- Theatrical release poster
- Directed by: Prasad Khandekar
- Written by: Story; Paritosh Painter; Screenplay and dialogues Prasad Khandekar
- Produced by: Paritosh Painter; Deepak Krishan Chaudhary; Rajesh Mohanty; Sejal Painter
- Starring: Sayaji Shinde; Girish Kulkarni; Tejaswini Pandit; Bhau Kadam; Prasad Khandekar; Namrata Sambherao; Vishakha Subhedar
- Cinematography: Yogesh Koli
- Edited by: Nilesh Gavand
- Music by: Rohan-Rohan; Kashyap Sompura
- Production companies: Ideas The Entertainment Company; Gold Mountain Pictures; SR Enterprises; Swarna Pat Katha
- Release date: 8 December 2023
- Country: India
- Language: Marathi
- Budget: est.₹4 crore
- Box office: est.₹8 crore

Ekda Yeun Tar Bagha (transl. Come and see once) is a 2023 Indian Marathi-language comedy drama film also known as Ekda Yeun Tar Bagha... Return Janarach Nahi. The film is written and directed by Prasad Khandekar in his directorial debut. The film is produced by Ideas The Entertainment Company, Gold Mountain Pictures, SR Enterprises and Swarna Pat Katha, and it stars an ensemble cast of Girish Kulkarni, Tejaswini Pandit, Prasad Khandekar, Namrata Sambherao, Sayaji Shinde, Bhau Kadam, Vishakha Subhedar and Onkar Bhojane. The film follows the story of three Phulambrikar brothers and their family, who start a hotel business, and their problems with customers.

The film was officially announced in September 2022, along with the title of the film. Principal photography commenced in October 2022. The soundtrack is composed by Rohan–Rohan and Kashyap Sompura.

Ekda Yeun Tar Bagha was theatrically released on 8 December 2023.

== Plot ==
The Phulambrikar family plans on converting their family's ancestral property in the village into a hotel because the village is very soon to be promoted as a tourist destination by the government. However, incidents continue to occur after the "Ekda Yeun Tar Bagha Hotel" is operational. People are dying one after the other in the hotel. To avoid legal complications, the family keeps burying bodies in the land.

== Cast ==
- Girish Kulkarni as Shravan Dada
- Tejaswini Pandit as Rohini
- Prasad Khandekar as Falgun
- Namrata Sambherao as Ashwini
- Sayaji Shinde as Nutan Sheth
- Bhau Kadam as Gulabi Garam Baba
- Vishakha Subhedar as Magru
- Onkar Bhojane as Kartik
- Pandharinath Kamble as Surve
- Rajendra Shisatkar as Inspector Bhosale
- Vanita Kharat as Shrivalli
- Rohit Mane as Bahubali
- Shashikant Kerkar as customer
- Sushil Inamdar as Chavan
- Jay Chaubey
- Rakesh Shalin

== Production ==
In mid-September 2022, producers Paritosh Painter and Rajesh Mohanty announced Ekda Yeun Tar Bagha along with six other films under the banner of Ideas The Entertainment Company and SR Enterprises.

The principal photography started in early October 2022 at Gaganbawada Ghat in Kolhapur. Speaking about the location, Khandekar said, "I often used to travel through Gaganbawda Ghat from Kolhapur to Konkan. So I wanted to capture the natural and scenic beauty of Gaganbawda Ghat and present it to the viewers. Hence, the shoot of the movie was completed at this location instead of in London." This is Sambherao's first film in a leading role and Khandekar's first feature film as a director.

== Soundtrack ==
Track listing
No.	Title	Lyrics	Music	Singer(s)	Length
1.	"Aali Ga Bhagabai"	Manndar Cholkar	Rohan-Rohan	Rohan Pradhan	3:04
2.	"Aiyo"	Manndar Cholkar	Rohan-Rohan	Rahul Vaidya; Vaishali Samant	3:30
3.	"Masti Chi Safar"	Manndar Cholkar	Kashyap Sompura	Sonu Nigam; Sriparna Chatterrjee	3:27
Total length:					10:01

== Release ==
On 18 September 2023, the first official motion poster featuring Girish Kulkarni, Tejaswini Pandit, Prasad Khandekar, Namrata Sambherao, Sayaji Shinde, Onkar Bhojane, Bhalchandra Kadam and Vishakha Subhedar was released, initially slated for release on 24 November 2023. The one-minute-long teaser was released on 20 October 2023. On 13 November 2023, the maker announced the new release date of 8 December 2023 to avoid clashing with other Hindi and Marathi films. The almost three-minute-long official trailer was released two weeks prior to the film. The trailer garnered positive feedback from the audience.

During the promotions, actor-director Khandekar expressed his disappointment that the movie was not getting theatres after its release. The issue was taken up in the winter session of the Legislative Assembly on 7 December 2023, by the leader of the Legislative Council, Pravin Darekar. He said, "There is an artist named Prasad Khandekar from Borivali. His movie, Ekda Yeun Tar Bagha, is releasing on 8th December. But some grandfathers and bosses in the cinema do not allow their Marathi movies to get cinemas. Khandekar is a Marathi youth from an ordinary family. Cinema halls should be made available for his Marathi film immediately. It is requested that the Chief Minister and Deputy Chief Minister look into this." Following that, Deputy Chief Minister Devendra Fadnavis assured that the theatre would be opened, saying, "Prasad Khandekar is a very talented artist. He has consistently ruled the hearts of people through comedy fairs. Legal action will also be taken as necessary if their Marathi movies do not get cinemas."

== Reception ==
=== Critical response ===
Upon its release, Ekda Yeun Tar Bagha received generally mixed to negative reviews from critics.

Anub George of The Times of India gave a negative review, rating it 1.5 out of 5 stars. He mentioned, "While there are definite moments where you laugh out loud, they are few and far between." Sanjay Ghavre of Lokmat gave it 2.5 out of 5 stars, praising its performance and music but criticized its lack of cohesion, stating, "The film does not feel cohesive. It feels like watching a skit in bits and pieces. The climax feels like the screenplay has been stretched and extended." Priya More from SaamTV praised the performances, especially that of Kulkarni, saying, "The film has a good grip till the interval. But in the second half, it is seen that this grip has loosened." A critic from Film Information commented, "Painter has written a story that is exaggerated so much that its comic flavor loses impact."

=== Box office ===
The film had a surprising first day at the box office, earning around ₹90.69 lakh (US$95,000), despite less screens. It showed excellent growth on first weekend grossing over ₹5.03 crore (US$520,000) worldwide. The film grossed ₹8 crore (US$830,000) in its final theatrical run.

=== Accolades ===
Award	Year	Category	Recipient(s)	Result
Sanskruti Kaladarpan	2024	Best Actor	Girish Kulkarni	Pending
Sanskruti Kaladarpan	2024	Best Supporting Actor	Prasad Khandekar	Pending
Sanskruti Kaladarpan	2024	Best Supporting Actress	Namrata Sambherao	Pending
Sanskruti Kaladarpan	2024	Best Actor in Comic Role	Namrata Sambherao	Pending
Sanskruti Kaladarpan	2024	Best Actor in Comic Role	Onkar Bhojane	Pending
Sanskruti Kaladarpan	2024	Best Music	Rohan-Rohan	Pending
