= Reena Madhukar =

Indian actress and model

Reena Madhukar Aggarwal
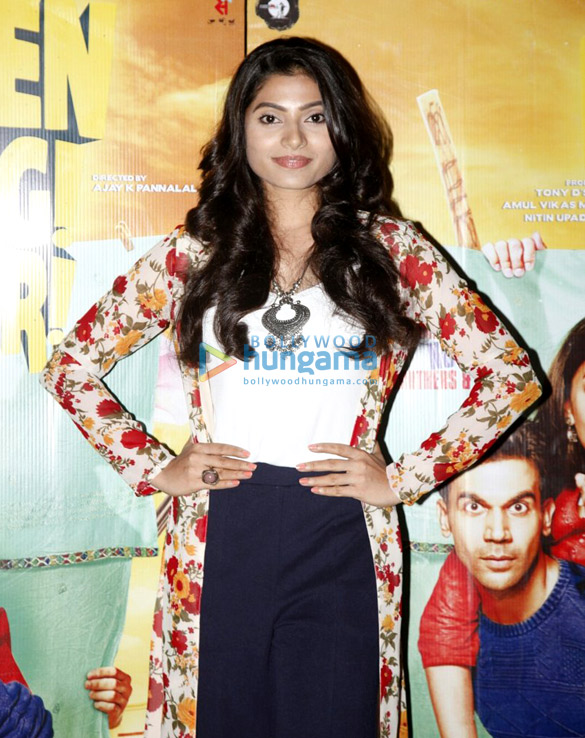
- Aggarwal at the special screening of Behen Hogi Teri in 2017
- Born: Pune, India
- Occupations: Actress, Model
- Years active: 2009–present

Reena Madhukar is an Indian actress who has appeared in feature films, television series and theatre productions.

== Acting career ==
Reena made her television debut with the Disney Channel India show Kya Mast Hai Life in 2009. She then acted in the Marathi film Ajintha in 2012, directed by Nitin Desai, as the second female lead. She also made her Bollywood debut with Talaash: The Answer Lies Within in 2012. She played the role of Savita, a female police constable, in the film. After that, she was seen in the &TV show Agent Raghav - Crime Branch as the Forensic Doctor Aarti Mistry. Her Marathi film Zala Bobhata was released on 6 January 2017. Her later films are Behen Hogi Teri (Hindi) and Dev Devharyat Nahi (Marathi). She has also acted in dramas and stage shows. Her acclaimed theatre drama performances include Mazi Bayko Mazi Mehuni in Marathi and Krishnapriya in Hindi. She also appeared in the promotional advertisement Kon Hoeel Marathi Crorepati 3 and the music video Rang Priticha. In 2018, Reena had a role in the film 31 Divas.

== Filmography ==
=== Films ===
Key
†	Denotes films that have not yet been released

Year	Film	Role	Language	Ref(s)
2012	Ajintha	Kamala	Marathi	
2012	Talaash: The Answer Lies Within	Savita	Hindi	
2017	Zala Bobhata		Marathi	
2017	Behen Hogi Teri	Ritu Arora	Hindi	
2017	Dev Devharyat Nahi	Vidya	Marathi	
2018	31 Divas	Meera	Marathi	
2023	Chhapa Kata	Archana	Marathi	
2024	Sur Lagu De		Marathi	

=== Television ===
Year	Show	Channel	Role
2009-2010	Kya Mast Hai Life	Disney Channel India	Tia
2012-2013	Balika Vadhu	Colors TV	Ashima
2015-2016	Agent Raghav - Crime Branch	& TV	Dr. Aarti Mistry
2021–2022	Man Udu Udu Jhala	Zee Marathi	Sanika Deshpande
2021–2022	Bade Achhe Lagte Hain 2	Sony TV	Vedika
