= Namrata Sambherao =

Indian actress

- Born: Namrata Awate; 29 August 1989 (age 37); Mumbai, Maharashtra, India
- Occupation: Actress
- Spouse: Yogesh Sambherao (m. 2013)
- Children: 1

Namrata Sambherao (née Awate; born 29 August 1989) is an Indian Marathi film, television and theatre actress. She is best known for her various roles in the popular comedy show Maharashtrachi Hasyajatra and has established herself as one of the prominent comedic performers in contemporary Marathi entertainment.

== Filmography ==
=== Films ===
Year	Title	Role	Notes	Ref.
2016	Happiness is...		Short film	
2016	Kiran Kulkarni vs Kiran Kulkarni			
2016	Ventilator	Rashmi		
2021	Altun Paltun	Lajjo Joshi (Lajwanti)		
2023	Vaalvi	Talkative Lady		
2023	Salman Society			
2023	Ekda Yeun Tar Bagha	Ashwini		
2024	Nach Ga Ghuma	Ashatai	Filmfare Award Marathi for Best Supporting Actress	
2026	Super Duperr	Suman		

=== Television ===
Year	Title	Role	Notes	Ref.
2010	Fu Bai Fu	Contestant		
2018–present	Maharashtrachi Hasyajatra	Contestant		
2020	Aathshe Khidkya Naushe Daara	Lalita		
2020–2021	Maharashtra's Best Dancer	Host		
2023	Gemadpanthi	Begum	Web series	

=== Theatre ===
Year	Title	Role	Ref.
2021–2023	Kurrr	Pooja	
