= Prasad Khandekar =

Indian actor, director, writer (born 1984)

- Born: Prasad Mahadev Khandekar; 5 May 1984 (age 42); Mumbai, Maharashtra, India
- Occupations: Actor; writer; director
- Known for: Maharashtrachi Hasyajatra
- Spouse: Alpa Talekar (m. 2013)
- Children: 1

Prasad Khandekar (born 5 May 1984) is an Indian actor and script writer, best known for his work in the Marathi comedy show Maharashtrachi Hasyajatra. He entered the film industry with the 2022 Marathi drama Lochya Zaala Re and made his directorial debut in 2023 with Ekda Yeun Tar Bagha.

== Life and career ==
Prasad Khandekar hails from Mumbai, Maharashtra. His father, Mahadev Khandekar, was the branch chief of Shiv Sena and died when Prasad was 14 years old. Before becoming an actor, Prasad was a sportsperson and was even selected for the Mumbai cricket team from under-14. However, he had to leave cricket due to an accident and was undergoing treatment at KEM Hospital for almost three months.

In 2018, he made his OTT debut with Netflix's first Indian Web Series Sacred Games. In 2022, he made his Marathi feature film debut with Lochya Zaala Re and also appeared in the Hindi web series Miya Biwi Aur Murder, starring Rajeev Khandelwal and Manjari Fadnis.

In 2023, he made his directorial debut with Ekda Yeun Tar Bagha... Return Janarach Nahi. In 2025, he appeared in ChikiChiki BooBoomBoom and also served as the film's director.

== Filmography ==
=== Film ===
Key
| † | Denotes films that have not yet been released |

| Year | Film | Actor | Writer | Director | Language | Notes | Ref(s) |
|---|---|---|---|---|---|---|---|
| 2018 | Liftman | Yes | Yes | No | Marathi | | |
| 2022 | Lochya Zaala Re | Yes | Yes | No | Marathi | | |
| 2022 | Dharmaveer | Yes | No | No | Marathi | Portrayed the role of Anant Tare | |
| 2023 | Ekda Yeun Tar Bagha... Return Janarach Nahi | Yes | Yes | Yes | Marathi | Directorial debut | |
| 2025 | ChikiChiki BooBoomBoom | Yes | Yes | Yes | Marathi | | |

=== Web series ===
| Year | Title | Role | Platform | Notes | Ref(s) |
|---|---|---|---|---|---|
| 2018 | Sacred Games | Chavvan (Bhosale's Pawn) | Netflix | OTT debut | |
| 2022 | Miya Biwi Aur Murder | Inspector Sawant | MX Player | | |

=== Television ===
| Year | Title | Role | Channel | Notes | Ref(s) |
|---|---|---|---|---|---|
| 2018–present | Maharashtrachi Hasyajatra | Various characters | Sony Marathi | Also writer | |

=== Stage work ===
| Year | Title | Role | Language | Notes | Ref(s) |
|---|---|---|---|---|---|
| 2021–2023 | Kurrr | Akshar | Marathi | Also director & writer | |
| 2024 | Thet Tumchya Gharatun | Kadam | Marathi | Director, actor, writer, producer | |

== Awards ==
- Natya Gaurav Puraskar
