= Rutuja Bagwe =

Indian actress

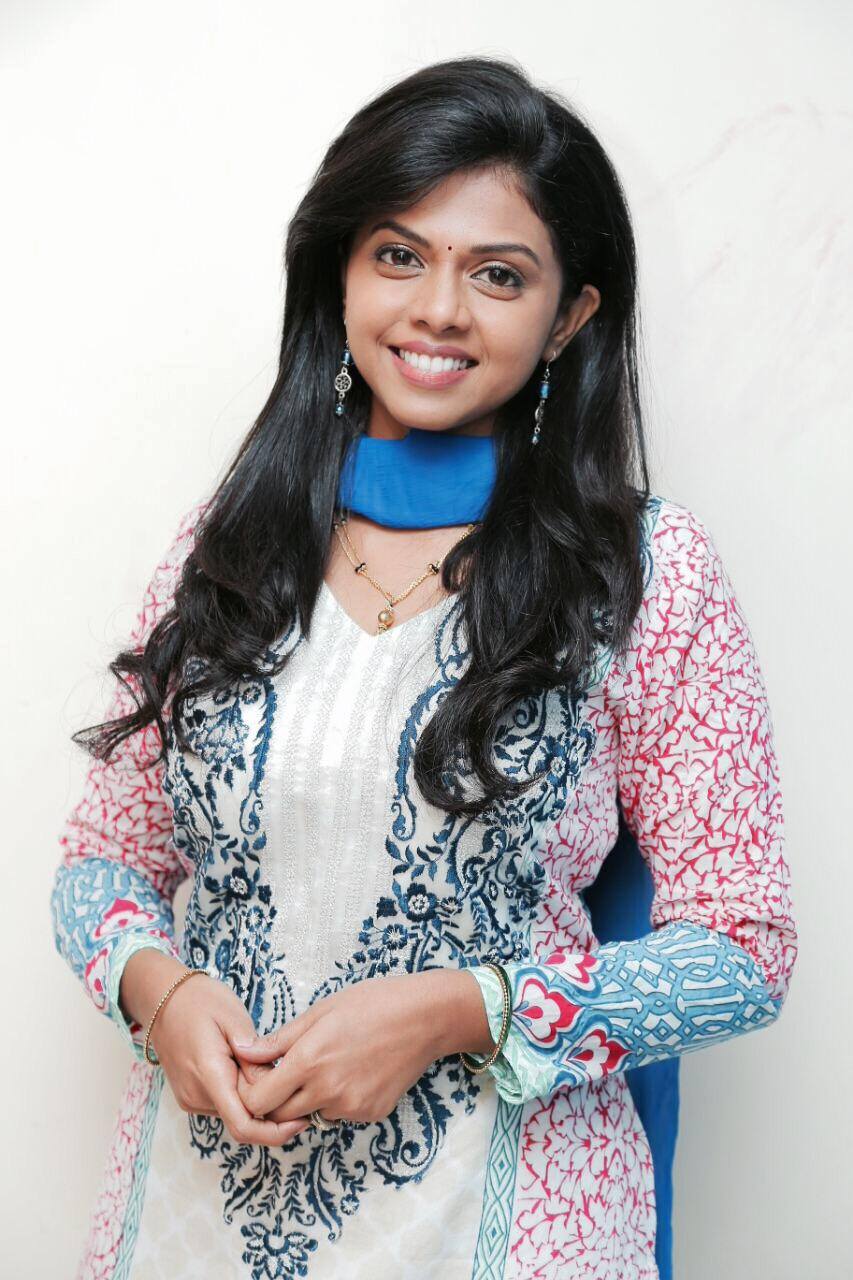
- Born: 9 September 1988 (age 37); Mumbai, Maharashtra
- Occupations: Actress, Dancer
- Years active: 2008-present
- Known for: Ananyaa; Nanda Saukhya Bhare; Chandra Aahe Sakshila; Maati Se Bandhi Dor

Rutuja Bagwe is an Indian actress and dancer. She mainly works in Hindi & Marathi films and television industry. She made her big screen debut with Marathi film Shaheed Bhai Kotwal. She is known for her lead role in Nanda Saukhya Bhare.

== Early life ==
Rutuja has completed her schooling from Parle Tilak Vidyalaya and Raigad Military School and she has done her graduation in B.Sc. Mathematics from Maharshi Dayanand Vidyalaya.

== Filmography ==
=== Television ===
Year	Title	Role	Ref.
2008	Hya Gojirwanya Gharat	Supporting role	
2008	Swamini	Supporting role	
2011	Mangalsutra	Supporting role	
2013	Eka Lagnachi Teesri Goshta	Supporting role	
2014	Pudhcha Paaul	Minakshi	
2014	Tu Majha Saangaati	Rakhma	
2015–2016	Nanda Saukhya Bhare	Swanandi	
2020–2021	Chandra Aahe Sakshila	Swati	
2024–2025	Maati Se Bandhi Dor	Vaijayanti (Hindi debut)	
2024	Jhanak	Vaijayanti (Special appearance)	
2024	Ghum Hai Kisikey Pyaar Meiin	Vaijayanti (Special appearance)	
2024	Udne Ki Aasha	Vaijayanti (Special appearance)	
2024	Yeh Rishta Kya Kehlata Hai	Vaijayanti (Special appearance)	
2025	Andhar Maya	Madhavi	

=== Films ===
Year	Title	Role	Ref.
2020	Respect	Suhas	
2020	Shaheed Bhai Kotwal	Indu Kotwal	
2023	Ankush	Nandini	
2023	London Misal	Aaditi	
2023	Songya	Shubhra	

=== Plays ===
Year	Title	Ref
2008	Gochi Premachi	
2011	Gurgaon Via Dadar	
2012	Silent Cream	
2018-2019	Ananya	

== Awards and nominations ==
Year	Awards	Category	Work	Role	Result	Ref.
2015	Zee Marathi Ustav Natyancha Awards	Best Actress	Nanda Saukhya Bhare	Swanandi Jahagirdar	Nominated	
2015	Zee Marathi Ustav Natyancha Awards	Vaman Hari Pethe Jewellers Best Face of the Year	Nanda Saukhya Bhare	Swanandi Jahagirdar	Won	
2018	Zee Natya Gaurav Puraskar 2018	Best Actress	Ananya	Ananya	Nominated	
2018	Zee Natya Gaurav Puraskar 2018	Natural Performance of the Year	Ananya	Ananya	Won	
2019	Mumbai Gaurav Abhinay Awards	Best Lead Actor in Play	Ananya	Ananya	Won	
