= Vanita Kharat =

Indian actress (born 1994)

- Born: 19 July 1994 (age 32); Mumbai, Maharashtra, India
- Education: Kirti M. Doongursee College
- Occupation: Actress
- Years active: 2010–present
- Spouse: Sumeet Londhe (m. 2023)

Vanita Kharat (born 19 July 1994) is an Indian actress from Mumbai, Maharashtra. She is well known performer in Marathi comedy show Maharashtrachi Hasyajatra. Kharat was featured in Vicky Velingkar and in Bollywood film Kabir Singh.

== Early and personal life ==
Kharat was born on 19 July 1994 in Mumbai, Maharashtra. She got married on 2 February 2023 to Sumeet Londhe.

== Filmography ==
=== Film ===
Key
†	Denotes films that have not yet been released

Year	Film	Role	Language	Notes	Ref(s)
2019	Kabir Singh	Kabir's Maid	Hindi	Bollywood debut	
2019	Vicky Velingkar		Marathi		
2021	Justice For Good Content		Hindi		
2021	Men Will Be Men	Jyoti	Hindi	Short film	
2022	Luckdown Be Positive	Vasu's cousin	Marathi		
2023	School College Ani Life		Marathi		
2023	Salman Society		Marathi		
2023	Ekda Yeun Tar Bagha	Shrivalli	Marathi		
2024	Phullwanti		Marathi		
2025	Ilu Ilu 1998	Jadhav Bai	Marathi		
2025	ChikiChiki BooBoomBoom	Babli	Marathi		
2025	Gulkand	Dhone Bai	Marathi		
2025	Ye Re Ye Re Paisa 3	Esha Danve Patil	Marathi		
2026	Jabraat		Marathi		
2026	Super Duperr	Sona	Marathi		

=== Television ===
Year	Title	Role	Language	Notes	Ref(s)
2018–present	Maharashtrachi Hasyajatra	Contestant	Marathi		
2019	Rang Majha Vegla	Interview Candidate for Job	Marathi		
2021	Sundari	Saheb	Marathi		
2022	RaanBaazaar	Bina Singh	Marathi	Web series	
2022	Tuzech Mi Geet Gaat Aahe	Ranjana	Marathi		
2023	Half CA	Landlady	Hindi		

=== Stage work ===
- Thoda Tujha Thoda Majha
- Shree Bai Samarth
