= Prabhakar More (actor) =

Indian actor and comedian

- Born: February 19, 1966 (age 60); Chiplun, Maharashtra, India
- Occupations: Actor; comedian
- Spouse: Prerna More

Prabhakar More (born 19 February 1966) is an Indian actor and comedian. He currently works in the Marathi language TV show Maharashtrachi Hasyajatra. He played supporting roles in the films Panghrun, Thackeray, Bodkyacha Bajirao, and Varhadi Vajantri.

== Early life ==
Prabhakar More was born in Chiplun and grew up in Wahal-Morewadi, Chiplun taluka of Ratnagiri district. He completed his schooling from Wahal high school, further education was done in DBJ college in Chiplun.

== Career ==
Prabhakar More made his theater debut with the plays of Santosh Pawar. He garnered popularity among the audience with his performances in many dramas. More has played the role of comedian and supporting actor in many serials and films. He acted in the films Kutumb (2012), Katti Batti (2015), Bai Go Bai (2015), Takatak (2019). Prabhakar More's comedy style in programs like Comedychi Bullet Train, Maharashtrachi Hasyajatra got the audience's vogue. He rose to fame after featured in the TV comedy show Maharashtrachi Hasyajatra. Apart from this he worked in the serial Post Office Ughada Aahe alongside Makarand Anaspure and Samir Choughule. He has also acted in Mahesh Manjrekar's biographical film Bhai: Vyakti Ki Valli and Panghrun. In 2022, he was featured in Dhondi Champya - Ek Prem Katha.

== Filmography ==
=== Film ===
Year	Film	Role	Notes	Ref(s)
2008	Bodkyacha Bajirao			
2012	Kutumb	Baban		
2015	Katti Batti		Hindi film	
2015	Bai Go Bai			
2019	Takatak	Baban		
2019	Black Label	Constable	short film	
2019	Bhai: Vyakti Ki Valli		based on Pu La Deshpande	
2019	Thackeray	Wamanrao Mahadik		
2022	Panghrun	Lakhoba		
2022	Varhadi Vajantri			
2022	Dhondi Champya - Ek Prem Katha			
2025	Last Stop Khanda			
2026	Lagnacha Shot	Railway ticket collector		

=== Web series ===
- RaanBaazaar as Palande's friend

=== Television ===
- Maharashtrachi Hasyajatra
- Post Office Ughada Aahe
- Comedychi Bullet Train
- Mi Punha Yein
- Veen Doghantali Hi Tutena

== Other work ==
More joined the Nationalist Congress Party in the presence of Ajit Pawar at the NCP's head office in Mumbai, where he was given the post of Chairman of Cultural Konkan Department. The NCP stated that official gambling is occurring through online rummy. Speaking about this, More stated that "other artists shouldn't do such commercials and that he would not promote rummy."
