= Tejaswini Pandit =

Indian actress

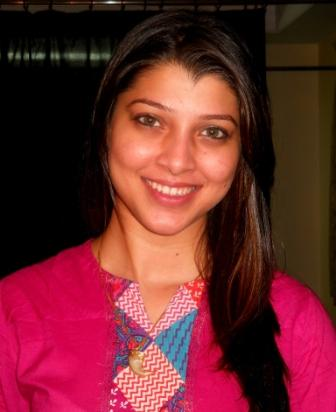
- Born: 23 May 1986 (age 40); Pune, Maharashtra, India
- Occupation: Actress
- Years active: 2004–present
- Spouse: Bhushan Bopche (m. 2012, separated)

Tejaswini Jyoti Ranjit Pandit (pronunciation: [t̪ed͡ʒəsʋiniː pəɳɖit̪]) (born on: 23 May 1986) is an Indian actress in Marathi language film and television. She made her debut with Kedar Shinde's Aga Bai Arrecha! film. She made her television debut with Star Pravah's Tuza Ni Maza Ghar Shrimantacha. She is known for her lead roles in Mee Sindhutai Sapkal, Tu Hi Re and Ye Re Ye Re Paisa.

== Career ==
Pandit played a negative role in Aga Bai Arrecha, directed by Kedar Shinde. After that, she did a theatre play; Rakheli. She next played a role of a woman who gets trapped with a terrorist group in Vavtal. She was also seen in the film Gaiir. She was next seen playing the titular role in the film Mee Sindhutai Sapkal, based on a real story. Her 2013 film Mukti was based on farmer suicide cases. She next played alongside Swapnil Joshi and Sai Tamhankar in director Sanjay Jadhav's film, Tu Hi Re. She plays the role of one of the lead characters of Samantar - an MX Player web series that also stars Swapnil Joshi.

== Personal life ==
Tejaswini is the daughter of late actress Jyoti Chandekar and late Ranjit Pandit. She married her childhood sweetheart Bhushan Bopche on 16 December 2012. Bhushan is the son of industrialist Rameshwar Roopchand Bopche. The marriage ceremony took place in Gondia on 16 December 2012. Later they separated.

== Filmography ==
=== As an actor ===
==== Films ====
Year	Title	Role	Ref (s)
2004	Aga Bai Arrecha	Aapa	
2005	Natha Pure Aata	Natha's wife	
2008	Rakheli	Rakheli	
2008	Foreignchi Patlin	Pushpa Patil	
2009	Gaiir	Netra	
2010	Mee Sindhutai Sapkal	Sindhutai Sapkal	
2010	Target	Sonal	
2010	Ranbhool	Reva	
2010	Vavtal	Juilee	
2011	Pakda Pakdi	Radha	
2012	Bluffmaster	Sanika	
2012	Mukti	Mukti	
2012	Vaishali Cottage	Shivani	Marathi play
2013	Angarki	Shabnam	
2014	Candle March	Anurata	
2015	Ek Tara	Urja	Musical film
2015	Tu Hi Re	Bhairavi	
2015	Yudh: Astitvachi Ladai	Ragini	
2016	7, Roshan Villa	Renu	
2016	Ticha Umbartha	Veebha	
2017	Deva	Maya	
2018	Ye Re Ye Re Paisa	Babali	
2019	Smile Please	Special Appearance In Song "Chal Pudhe"	
2023	Adipurush	Shurpanakha	Hindi; Telugu (bilingual film)
2023	Ekda Yeun Tar Bagha	Rohini	
2024	Aho Vikramaarka	Bhawani Shankar	Telugu film
2025	Ye Re Ye Re Paisa 3	Bubbly	

==== Television ====
Year	Title	Role
2007	Gaane Tumche Amche	Host
2010	Tuza Ni Maza Ghar Shrimantacha	Kaveri
2010–2011	Lajja	Sheetal
2011–2012	Ekach Hya Janmi Janu	Anjali
2013	Kalay Tasmai Namah	Shalaka
2016–2017	100 Days	Rani

==== Web series ====
Year	Serial	Role	Notes
2020	Samantar	Neema Mahajan	
2021	Samantar 2	Neema Mahajan	
2021	Anuradha	Anuradha	
2022	RaanBaazaar	Ayesha Singh	

=== As a producer ===
Year	Serial	Notes
2022	Athang	
2024	Yek Number	

== Awards and nominations ==
Year	Award	Category	Film/serial/play	Result	Ref.
2009	Ma. Ta. Sanman	Best Actress	Wavtal	Won	
2009	Sanskruti Kaladarpan	Best Actress	Wavtal	Nominated	
2010	Sanskruti Kaladarpan	Best Actress	Gaiir	Nominated	
2011	Sanskruti Kaladarpan	Best Actress	Mee Sindhutai Sapkal	Nominated	
2011	Asia Pacific Screen Awards	Best Actress	Mee Sindhutai Sapkal	Nominated	
2011	Ma. Ta. Sanman	Best Actress	Mee Sindhutai Sapkal	Nominated	
2011	Spain (Madrid)	Best Actress	Mee Sindhutai Sapkal	Won	
2011	International Film Festival	Best Actress	Mee Sindhutai Sapkal	Won	
2011	MIFTA	Best Actress	Mee Sindhutai Sapkal	Won	
2011	Zee Gaurav Puraskar	Best Actress	Mee Sindhutai Sapkal	Won	
2011	Maharashtracha Favourite Kon	Best Actress	Mee Sindhutai Sapkal	Won	
2011	Lokmat Times Awards	Best Actress	Mee Sindhutai Sapkal	Won	
2011	Sahyadri Ratna Puraskar	Best Actress	Mee Sindhutai Sapkal	Won	
2011	Big Marathi Rising	Best Actress	Mee Sindhutai Sapkal	Won	
2011	Star Awards	Best Actress	Mee Sindhutai Sapkal	Won	
2011	Zee Marathi Awards	Popular Face of the Year	Ekach Hya Janmi Janu	Won	
2012	Zee Gaurav Puraskar	Best Actress	Vaishali Cottage	Won	
2012	MICTA	Best Actor in Female	Vaishali Cottage	Nominated	
2015	Kolhapur Film Festival	Best Actor in Female	7 Roshan Villa	Won	
2015	Chitradrashtri Film Festival	Best Actress	7 Roshan Villa	Won	
2015	Zee Gaurav Puraskar	Best Actress	Ticha Umbartha	Won	
2015	Sanskruti Kaladarpan	Best Actress	Ticha Umbartha	Won	
2015	NIFF	Best Actress	Ticha Umbartha	Won	
2015	Sangli International Film Festival	Best Actress	Ticha Umbartha	Won	
2015	Chitrapusha Film Festival	Best Actress	Ticha Umbartha	Won	
