= Vedat Marathe Veer Daudle Saat =

Unfinished film by Mahesh Manjrekar

- First look poster
- Directed by: Mahesh Manjrekar
- Written by: Parag Kulkarni
- Produced by: Vaseem Qureshi Mahesh Manjrekar
- Starring: Pravin Tarde; Vishal Nikam; Jay Dudhane; Virat Madke; Utkarsha Shinde; Hardeek Joshi; Satya Manjrekar
- Cinematography: Karan B. Rawat
- Music by: Hitesh Modak
- Production companies: Qureshi Productions Private limited; Mahesh Manjrekar Movies
- Distributed by: Zee Studios
- Country: India
- Language: Marathi

Vedat Marathe Veer Daudle Saat (transl. The Brave Seven Marathas Ran In Madness) is an unreleased Indian Marathi-language period drama film directed by Mahesh Manjrekar and produced by Vaseem Qureshi under the banner of Qureshi Productions. The film stars Pravin Tarde, Hardeek Joshi, Vishal Nikam, Jay Dudhane, Utkarsha Shinde and Virat Madke as the seven great Maratha warriors who playing important role to achieve the dream of Hindavi Swarajya, while Hindi film actor Akshay Kumar in an extended cameo role who marks his Marathi film debut as Chhatrapati Shivaji Maharaj.

Manjrekar developed the story over seven years ago. The official announcement for the film came in November 2022, followed by principal photography starting in December 2022, helmed by cinematographer Karan B. Rawat who previously collaborated in Panghrun with Manjrekar. The filming took place in Mumbai, Panhala, and Kolhapur. The music score will be provided by Hitesh Modak. Initially slated for a Diwali 2023 release, the film was delayed due to production issues. Half of production is completed in June 2024, but filming was ultimately postponed due to financial problems over the higher budget.

The film was initially supposed to be released on Diwali but it was changed to avoid clashing with Tiger 3.

== Premise ==
Vedat Maratha Veer Daudle Saat is based on a story about seven legendary warriors in the Maratha Empire who attempt to achieve independence (swaraj) in 1674.

== Cast ==
- Pravin Tarde as Prataprao Gujar
- Vishal Nikam as Chandraji Kothar
- Virat Madke as Jivaji Patil
- Hardeek Joshi as Malhari Lokhande
- Satya Manjrekar as Dattaji Page
- Utkarsha Shinde as Suryaji Dandkar
- Jay Dudhane as Tulja Jamkar
- Gauri Ingawale
- Nawab Khan
- Jisshu Sengupta
- Akshay Kumar as Chhatrapati Shivaji Maharaj (extended cameo appearance)

== Production ==
=== Development ===
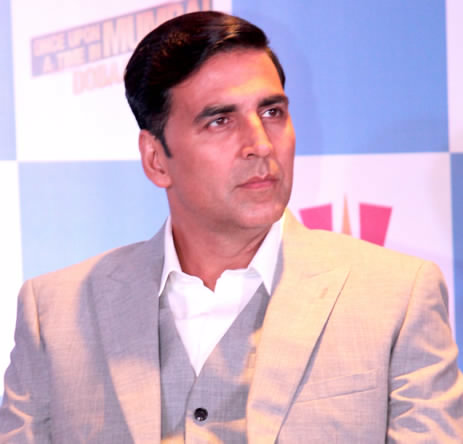
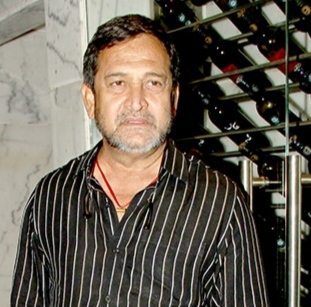
Vedat Marathe Veer Daudle Saat is the first collaboration of Akshay Kumar (left) with Mahesh Manjrekar (right), making a debut in Marathi cinema in an extended cameo.

Manjrekar planned Vedat Marathe Veer Daudle Saat for 7 years. Describing his project, Manjrekar mentioned "This film is my dream project based on the story of seven brave warriors whose sole mission is to realize Shivaji Maharaj's dream of Swaraj by writing one of the most glorious pages in history". In November 2022, the makers revealed that Akshay Kumar will play an extended cameo role as Shivaji Maharaj in the film, following a month later, Kumar released a short video of himself as emperor, which quickly gained attention. Kumar is making his debut in Marathi cinema. (Note: Kumar has previously made a guest appearance in the Marathi film Aadhar.) He spent 20 to 25 days preparing for his role with specialists in body language and diction. At an announcement event, the filmmakers revealed that the film will release on Diwali 2023. It was graced by the Chief minister of Maharashtra Eknath Shinde, MNS president Raj Thackeray and Bollywood actor Salman Khan. In September 2023, there were reports of the film being postponed to avoid clashing with Tiger 3. It was also revealed that the delay in releasing was caused by the team needing extra time to shoot the war scenes.

=== Casting ===
Mahesh Manjrekar revealed the importance of casting for the role of Chhatrapati Shivaji Maharaj, aiming for someone younger and resembling the historical figure. Akshay Kumar was chosen for the role due to his physical resemblance, particularly his nose, which matched the sketches of Shivaji Maharaj according to Manjrekar. At the launch event, alongside Kumar, other pivotal roles were also introduced, including Pravin Tarde, Hardeek Joshi, Vishal Nikam, Utkarsha Shinde, Jai Dudhane, Virat Madke, and Satya Manjrekar. The cast and their costumes were revealed in October 2022. Satya Manjrekar, son of Mahesh Manjrekar, was chosen to play the role of Dattaji Page. According to Satya Manjrekar he has been part of this film since 2018. However, there are discussions indicating his departure from the film, with rumors suggesting that Aroh Velankar will take his place.

=== Filming ===
Principal photography of the film started in December 2022 in Mumbai. A 19-year-old crew member Nagesh Prashant Khobare from Hipparga, Solapur district, fell from the fortifications at Sajja Kothi area of Panhala fort while filming was ongoing. Despite efforts to rescue him, he sustained severe head and chest injuries and died on March 28, 2023, during treatment at a private hospital after battling for ten days. The film has also been filmed in Kolhapur. Originally Akshay Kumar planned to shoot for 7–8 days, but he has only been present for three days of shooting. In June 2024, half of the film's shooting was finished before filming halted due to financial issues stemming from a higher budget, prompting producer Wasim Qureshi to cease production. It was reported that the shooting had been finished by the end of April 2026.

== Release ==
The film originally slated for Diwali 2023, was rescheduled to avoid conflicting with Tiger 3. Additionally, it will be released in Marathi, Hindi, Tamil, and Telugu languages.

== Criticism ==
A descendant of Prataprao Gujar, Suresh Gujar, along with villagers from Nesari and Bhosare in the Satara district, has strongly opposed the film, stating that they will not tolerate Manjrekar's distortion of history with fictitious names instead of real warrior names. Former MP Sambhaji Raje held a press conference in Pune and expressed his opposition to the film.

The film received heavy criticism from several people for its casting, mainly Akshay Kumar as Chhatrapati Shivaji Maharaj due to Kumar's poor performance in historical film Samrat Prithviraj.

== Music ==
The music and background score is composed by Hitesh Modak.
