= MFK Award for Favourite Film =

Indian film award

Maharashtracha Favourite Kon? for Favourite Film
- Awarded for: Best Film
- Country: India
- Presented by: Zee Talkies
- First award: De Dhakka (2009)
- Currently held by: Ved (2023)

Maharashtracha Favourite Kon? Award for Favourite Film is given by Zee Talkies as part of its annual Maharashtracha Favourite Kon? ceremony for Marathi films in India. The award was first given in 2009.

== Winners and nominees ==
Year	Film	Producer(s)	Ref.
2009	De Dhakka	Mahesh Manjrekar	
2009	Sanai Choughade	Shreyas Talpade	
2009	Amhi Satpute	Sachin Pilgaonkar	
2010	Me Shivajiraje Bhosale Boltoy	Mahesh Manjrekar	
2010	Shikshanachya Aaicha Gho	Mahesh Manjrekar	
2010	Natarang	Zee Talkies	
2010	Ek Daav Dhobi Pachhad	Zee Talkies	
2010	Gallit Gondhal, Dillit Mujra	Nagesh Bhonsle, Makarand Anaspure & Sayaji Shinde	
2011	Mee Sindhutai Sapkal	Bindiya Khanolkar & Sachin Khanolkar	
2011	Lalbaug Parel	DAR Motion Pictures	
2011	Taryanche Bait	Balaji Motion Pictures	
2011	Balgandharva	Nitin Chandrakant Desai	
2011	Fakta Ladh Mhana	Mahesh Manjrekar	
2012	Kaksparsh	Medha Manjrekar	
2012	Shala	Mahesh Manjrekar	
2012	Morya	Avadhoot Gupte, Atul Kamble	
2012	Tukaram	Everest Entertainment	
2012	Deool	Devisha Films	
2013	Duniyadari	Dreaming 24×7 Productions	
2013	Balak Palak	Mumbai Film Company	
2013	Ekulti Ek	Sachin Pilgaonkar	
2013	Time Please	Everest Entertainment	
2013	Zapatlela 2	Viacom18 Studios, Kothare Vision	
2014	Lai Bhaari	Mumbai Film Company	
2014	Poshter Boyz	Shreyas Talpade	
2014	Fandry	Navlakha Arts	
2014	Timepass	Zee Talkies	
2014	Rege	Ashwini Darekar	
2015	Dr. Prakash Baba Amte – The Real Hero	Essel Vision Productions	
2015	Timepass 2	Essel Vision Productions	
2015	Double Seat	Essel Vision Productions	
2015	Elizabeth Ekadashi	Essel Vision Productions	
2015	Killa	Essel Vision Productions	
2015	Classmates	Mahalasa Entertainment Media Monks	
2016	Sairat	Zee Studios, Essel Vision Productions & Aatpat Productions	
2016	Katyar Kaljat Ghusali	Essel Vision Productions	
2016	Natsamrat	Nana Patekar & Vishwas Joshi	
2016	Dagadi Chawl	Amol Kale & Suresh Sawant	
2016	Poshter Girl	Viacom18 Studios, Chalo Film Banaye	
2016	Mumbai-Pune-Mumbai 2	Yashila Enterprises	
2017	Faster Fene	Mumbai Film Company	
2017	Ti Saddhya Kay Karte	Zee Studios	
2017	Ventilator	Priyanka Chopra	
2017	Chi Va Chi Sau Ka	Zee Studios	
2017	Muramba	Nitin Vaidya, Ninad Vaidya	
2017	Boyz	Supreme Motion Pictures	
2018	Mulshi Pattern	Punit Balan	
2018	Ye Re Ye Re Paisa	Zee Studios	
2018	Naal	Zee Studios	
2018	Farzand	Swami Samarth Creations LLP	
2018	Baban	Chitraksha Films	
2018	Boyz 2	Everest Entertainment, Supreme Motion Pictures	
2019	Hirkani	Irada Entertainment	
2019	Anandi Gopal	Zee Studios	
2019	Ye Re Ye Re Paisa 2	Panorama Studios	
2019	Fatteshikast	Almond Creations	
2019	Khari Biscuit	Dreaming 24×7 Productions	
2019	Takatak	Supreme Motion Pictures	
2021	Sairat	Zee Studios, Essel Vision Productions & Aatpat Productions	
2021	Me Shivajiraje Bhosale Boltoy	Mahesh Manjrekar	
2021	Mee Sindhutai Sapkal	Bindiya Khanolkar, Sachin Khanolkar	
2021	Kaksparsh	Medha Manjrekar	
2021	Duniyadari	Dreaming 24×7 Productions	
2021	Lai Bhaari	Mumbai Film Company	
2021	Dr. Prakash Baba Amte – The Real Hero	Essel Vision Productions	
2021	Faster Fene	Mumbai Film Company	
2021	Mulshi Pattern	Punit Balan	
2021	Hirkani	Irada Entertainment	
2022	Dharmaveer	Mangesh Desai	
2022	Chandramukhi	Planet Marathi	
2022	Har Har Mahadev	Zee Studios	
2022	Timepass 3	Zee Studios	
2022	Pandu	Zee Studios	
2022	Sher Shivraj	Mulakshar Productions	
2022	Zombivli	Saregama India Ltd.	
2022	De Dhakka 2	Mahesh Manjrekar	
2023	Ved	Mumbai Film Company	
2023	Baipan Bhaari Deva	Jio Studios, EmVeeBee Media	
2023	Subhedar	Mulakshar Productions, Raajwarasa Productions, Prithviraj Productions, Rajau Productions, Parampara Productions	
2023	Maharashtra Shahir	Everest Entertainment, Kedar Shinde Productions	
2023	Vaalvi	Zee Studios	
2023	Jhimma 2	Chalchitra Mandalee, Jio Studios, Colour Yellow Productions, Crazy Few Films	
2023	Naal 2	Aatpat Production, Zee Studios	
2023	Ghar Banduk Biryani	Aatpat Production, Zee Studios	
