= Bandkhor =

2026 film directed by Mahesh Manjrekar

- Directed by: Mahesh Manjrekar
- Written by: Mahesh Manjrekar; Dialogue: Irawati Karnik; Siddharth Salvi
- Produced by: Sanjay Shetye
- Starring: Mrinal Kulkarni; Chhaya Kadam; Priyadarshini Indalkar; Pooja Katurde; Titeeksha Tawde; Nityashree Patil
- Cinematography: Karan B. Rawat
- Edited by: Satish Padwal
- Music by: Hitesh Modak; Piyush–Mahesh
- Production company: Vinsan Graphic Production
- Distributed by: AA Films
- Release date: 24 September 2026
- Running time: 132 minutes
- Country: India
- Language: Marathi

Bandkhor (transl. Rebel) also spelled Bandakhor is a 2026 Indian Marathi-language drama film written and directed by Mahesh Manjrekar and produced by Sanjay Shetye under the banner of Vinsan Graphic Production. The film follows six women from different backgrounds who come together to fight against injustice and societal barriers. It stars Mrinal Kulkarni, Chhaya Kadam, Priyadarshini Indalkar, Pooja Katurde, Titeeksha Tawde and Nityashree Patil in the lead roles.

The film was released theatrically on 24 September 2026.

== Plot ==
Meera, a young woman from Goa who lives in Mumbai, works for a large advertising company. Outspoken, hardworking and independent, she is passionate about her career and refuses to compromise on her professional choices. She is in a relationship with Neil, with whom she plans to celebrate the anniversary of their first meeting. However, when Meera's colleague Abhas unexpectedly joins them, Neil becomes suspicious of their relationship. His doubts create a rift between the couple, eventually leading to their breakup.

Soon after, Meera learns of the death of her grandfather and returns to her family's home in Goa. The death brings several members of the family together, including her grandmother Usha, her mother Seema, Sharda, Urvashi, Rupa and her maternal uncle. As the family gathers to mourn, long-standing tensions, grievances and personal struggles gradually come to the surface. Usha, the family's matriarch, has spent much of her married life accepting Sharda, a woman who was kept by her late husband. Rather than rejecting Sharda after her husband's death, Usha accepts her into the family and supports her claim to the property and wealth she believes she deserves. Her decision challenges the traditional expectations placed on women within the family.

Meera's mother, Seema, has also experienced injustice in her marital home. After rebelling against the treatment she received from her in-laws, she raises Meera as a single mother and establishes herself as a successful businesswoman. Her experiences shape Meera's independent outlook and determination to make her own choices. As Meera spends time with the women in her family, she begins to understand the struggles and compromises that have shaped their lives. Unlike Usha and Seema, who have confronted patriarchal customs through patience and perseverance, Meera adopts a more outspoken and confrontational approach. Her attitude brings her into conflict with her maternal uncle, who represents the family's traditional patriarchal authority.

Meera's courage also influences the younger women in the family. As they witness her willingness to challenge established customs, they begin questioning the roles and restrictions imposed on them. Long-standing differences between the women gradually give way to mutual understanding and solidarity. Their individual struggles eventually converge as the women unite against the injustices imposed by family traditions and patriarchal authority. By supporting one another, they challenge the established order within the family and assert their right to make decisions about their own lives.

== Cast ==
- Mrinal Kulkarni as Sharda
- Chhaya Kadam as Usha
- Priyadarshini Indalkar as Meera
- Pooja Katurde as Rupa
- Titeeksha Tawde as Seema
- Nityashree Gyanalakshmi as Urvashi
- Sanket Pathak as Neil
- Mangesh Desai as Sadanand
- Angad Mhaskar as Namdev
- Mahesh Manjrekar as Rahul
- Siddharth Bodke as Abhas
- Mayur More

== Production ==
Mahesh Manjrekar had written the story approximately ten years before production began, based on an idea he got from his elder daughter, Ashwami Manjrekar. Discussing the casting, he said that rather than choosing actors based on obvious casting choices, he considered their personalities when selecting the cast. Manjrekar also revealed that his wife, actress Medha Manjrekar, was originally set to play the mother of Priyadarshini Indalkar's character, but opted out of the film after being diagnosed with cancer and undergoing treatment.

The film's muhurat shot was held in Goa in the presence of Goa Chief Minister Pramod Sawant and MLA Delilah Lobo, along with members of the cast and crew. The film is produced under the banner of Vinsan Graphic Production, a production house based in Goa.

== Release ==
The teaser for the film was released on 24 August 2026. The trailer was launched at a grand event on 7 September 2026 at the Nita Mukesh Ambani Cultural Centre in Mumbai. The event was attended by Maharashtra Deputy Chief Minister Sunetra Pawar and former Indian cricketer Sunil Gavaskar.

Bandkhor was released theatrically on 24 September 2026 with an "A" certificate from the Central Board of Film Certification (CBFC).

== Reception ==
Reshma Raikwar of Loksatta wrote, "Society may label it as rebellion, but director Mahesh Manjrekar's attempt to convey that it is living for herself is remarkable here." Kalpeshraj Kubal of Maharashtra Times gave the film 3 out of 5 stars, writing, "It could have been more pointed in some places, but the overall effect is still good." Santosh Bhingarde of Sakal gave the film 3 out of 5 stars, stating, "The film is memorable due to its subject matter, emotional scenes, and the effective acting of the actors." A review by Pudhari stated, "Although his [Mahesh Majrekar] attempt to weave many women's issues into a single story is successful, the struggle faced by each of them is not highlighted with the same intensity."
