= Har Har Mahadev =

2022 Marathi-language historical drama film

- Theatrical release poster
- Directed by: Abhijeet Deshpande
- Written by: Abhijeet Deshpande
- Produced by: Zee Studios; Sunil Phadtare
- Starring: Subodh Bhave; Sharad Kelkar; Amruta Khanvilkar; Nishigandha Wad
- Narrated by: Raj Thackeray
- Cinematography: Tribhuvan Babu Sadineni
- Edited by: Kshitija Khandagale
- Music by: Hitesh Modak
- Production companies: Zee Studios; Shree Ganesh Marketing And Films
- Distributed by: Zee Studios
- Release date: 25 October 2022
- Running time: 162 minutes
- Country: India
- Language: Marathi
- Budget: ₹10–15 crore

Har Har Mahadev is a 2022 Indian Marathi-language epic historical action drama film written and directed by Abhijeet Deshpande and produced by Zee Studios along with Sunil Phadtare under the banner of Shree Ganesh Marketing And Films. It stars Subodh Bhave as Shivaji I and Sharad Kelkar as Baji Prabhu Deshpande with Amruta Khanvilkar, Nishigandha Wad, Sayali Sanjeev, Hardeek Joshi, Milind Shinde, Kishore Kadam, Nitish Chavan and Ashok Shinde playing supporting roles. The film is about the Battle of Pavan Khind where Baji Prabhu Deshpande, a general of Shivaji I who, along with his army of 300 soldiers, fought against 12,000 Bijapuri soldiers.

The film was released theatrically on 25 October 2022 and digitally in Hindi on 8 December 2022 on ZEE5. The film collected a gross of ₹25 crore (US$2.6 million), it became the third-highest-grossing Marathi film of 2022. The film won three Maharashtra State Film Awards, including Best Film III and Best Director III, and received two Zee Chitra Gaurav Puraskar, and earned two nominations at the 7th Filmfare Awards Marathi.

== Synopsis ==
The film is about the Battle of Pavan Khind where 300 soldiers, led by Baji Prabhu Deshpande, the commander of Shivaji fought against 12,000 Bijapuri soldiers.

== Plot ==
As the petty feudal lords and Watandars of the region express concerns about Shivaji's expanding dominion, Baji Prabhu is approached to contain the young warrior's ambitions. However, when Shivaji meets Baji Prabhu and presents his vision of establishing a rule that cares for the people, Baji Prabhu gradually shifts his allegiance. The two warriors develop a profound bond of mutual respect, with each becoming willing to sacrifice his life for the other's cause.

Following Shivaji's strategic assassination of Afzal Khan, the feared Adilshahi general, the court of Bijapur grows furious. Siddi Johar, a cunning and shrewd Adilshahi commander, launches a massive military campaign against Shivaji. With an overwhelming force, Siddi Johar lays siege to the Panhala fort, where Shivaji and his soldiers have taken refuge.

Facing the siege, Shivaji resolves to escape to Vishalgad fort under the cover of darkness. On a rain-soaked night, Shivaji and approximately 300 handpicked soldiers, led by Baji Prabhu Deshpande, break through the siege. As they advance toward Vishalgad, Siddi Johar's forces pursue them relentlessly. Realizing the pursuing army will overtake them, Baji Prabhu devises a plan to hold back the enemy at a narrow mountain pass known as Pavan Khind while Shivaji reaches safety. Shivaji is to signal Baji Prabhu's retreat by firing three cannon shots once he arrives at Vishalgad.

At Pavan Khind, Baji Prabhu Deshpande and his 300 warriors engage in a fierce battle against the vastly larger Adilshahi force. Armed with his sword and dandpatta, Baji Prabhu fights with extraordinary valor throughout the confrontation. Despite being outnumbered, his warriors hold their ground for hours. Baji Prabhu is wounded by gunfire but continues fighting, inspiring his soldiers to resist until their final breath. Upon hearing the three cannon shots from Vishalgad, Baji Prabhu realizes his mission is complete. He and his warriors achieve martyrdom, having successfully held back thousands of enemy soldiers. The sacrifice at Pavan Khind becomes a legendary testament to the courage of the Maratha warriors and proves instrumental in the survival and continuation of Shivaji's vision for Hindavi Swarajya.

== Cast ==
- Subodh Bhave as Shivaji I, founder of the Maratha Empire and warrior king who was known for his courage and the strategies to defeat Adilshahi and the Mughals in many of his battles.
- Sharad Kelkar as Baji Prabhu Deshpande, general of Shivaji's army who loses his life during the Battle of Pavan Khind.
- Amruta Khanvilkar as Sonabai Deshpande, wife to Baji Prabhu Deshpande and the homemaker who takes care of the house and passionately supports the warrior.
- Nishigandha Wad as Rajmata Jijau, Shivaji's mother.
- Sayali Sanjeev as Sai Bhonsale, Shivaji's consort.
- Hardeek Joshi as Abaji Vishwanath, the clever, courageous, loyal companion who supported Shivaji till the end in the battle of Swarajya.
- Nitish Chavan as Dhanaji Mhaskar, one of his many loyal, courageous and trustworthy Mavlas, who obeyed Shivaji's order.
- Milind Shinde as Siddi Johar, a traitor for Adil Shah, who has the urge to kill Shivaji.
- Kishor Kadam as Tawji, the most talented and skilled blacksmith who produced weapons for Mavalas fighting Bandal Sena and Swarajya.
- Ashok Shinde as Fulaji Prabhu Deshpande, the elder brother of Baji Prabhu Deshpande and a companion of Shivaji.
- Sharad Ponkshe as Deshmukh
- Mohan Joshi as Dhondiba
- Swapnil Rajshekhar
- Shrikant Yadav
- Atharva Bedekar
- Rohan Ekke
- Surendra Thakur
- Sachin Shinde
- Snigdha Akolkar
- Sonali Patil
- Rajas Sule as Sada

== Soundtrack ==
Har Har Mahadev

Soundtrack album by Hitesh Modak
- Released: 7 October 2022
- Recorded: 2022
- Genre: Feature film soundtrack
- Length: 12:19
- Language: Marathi
- Label: Zee Music Company

Hitesh Modak chronology
Panghrun (2022)	Har Har Mahadev (2022)	Juna Furniture (2024)

Official audio
- Har Har Mahadev - Full Album on YouTube

The music of the film is composed by Hitesh Modak and the lyrics are written by Mangesh Kangane and Mandar Cholkar.

Track listing
No.	Title	Lyrics	Singer(s)	Length
1.	"Wah Re Shiva"	Mangesh Kangane	Sid Sriram	4:06
2.	"Har Har Mahadev - Title Track"	Mangesh Kangane	Shankar Mahadevan, Hitesh Modak	4:12
3.	"Baaji Ra"	Mandar Cholkar	Manish Rajgire	3:47
Total length:				12:19

== Marketing and release ==
The teaser of the film was released on 4 March 2022, which included a voice-over given by Raj Thackeray. The trailer of the film was released on 10 October 2022 and received 5 million views in less than 24 hours on YouTube.

=== Theatrical ===
The film was released theatrically on 25 October 2022. It also became the first Marathi film to be released in Hindi, Tamil, Telugu and Kannada languages.

=== Home media ===
The film was released on 9 December 2022 on ZEE5.

== Reception ==
Har Har Mahadev met with critical acclaim, with emphasis on the direction, the cast's performance, cinematography, visual effects, and emotional weight.

Subhash K Jha of IWM Buzz gave 4 out of 5 stars and wrote, “Go for this disarming tryst with history with open arms. It is an experience of a lifetime. Powerful and persuasive, with some sequences designed to cause goosebumps.” Shalmesh More of Koimoi.com rated the film 3.5 out of 5 stars and wrote “Har Har Mahadev is driven by a story that has already been told but still deserves your watch on the big screen due to its emotional treatment. It's more than a war drama!” Mihir Bhanage of The Times of India gave the film 3 out of 5 stars and said, “The film succeeds in creating a big-screen spectacle, but the repeat value in the story dampens the spirit.”

Shaheen Irani of OTTplay rated 3 out of 5 stars and wrote, “Har Har Mahadev is a cinematic brilliance in the last hour of the film. Up to that point, you are only trying to figure out where the story is headed and where it will lead to. Even then, although the visuals are beyond appealing, the music is not.” Mayur Sanap of Rediff.com calls it an “emotionally-charged war drama” and appreciated the cast. Overall he wrote “Har Har Mahadev is not without flaws and had the potential for much more. But credit to Director Deshpande for attempting to make the tale layered and emotionally moving.” with a rating of 2.5 out of 5 stars.

Sameer Ahire of Movie Talkies criticised the direction but appreciated Kelkar, Khanvilkar, and Sanjeev's performance and wrote, “Sharad Kelkar's Electrifying Act Saves The Mediocre Vision Of Abhijeet Deshpande In This Legendary Tale.” He gave 2.5 stars out of 5. Likewise, Film Information gave positive reviews, noting Deshpande's impactful direction, dialogues, and Sadineni's camerawork but criticised the editing.

== Controversy ==
Following the release of the trailer, the Bandal descendants objected to the trailer and submitted a detailed complaint letter two days before the film's premiere, alleging that the film is based on a false history. Within a week after the film's release, Amol Mitkari of the Nationalist Congress Party and politician Sambhaji Raje, the 13th direct descendant of Shivaji, and their outfit Swarajya Sanghatan criticized it as misleading historical revisionism. On 7 November 2022, MLA Jitendra Awad and NCP workers shut down the film's screening in Thane's Viviana Mall. A fan was also assaulted by an activist. The film's director clarified his position on this matter during a press conference, stating that the film is based on historical sources and has been submitted to the Censor Board.

== Accolades ==
Award	Date of ceremony	Category	Recipient(s)	Result	Ref.
Maharashtracha Favourite Kon?	20 January 2023	Favourite Film	Har Har Mahadev	Nominated	
Maharashtracha Favourite Kon?	20 January 2023	Favourite Director	Abhijeet Deshpande	Nominated	
Maharashtracha Favourite Kon?	20 January 2023	Favourite Actor	Sharad Kelkar	Nominated	
Maharashtracha Favourite Kon?	20 January 2023	Favourite Supporting Actress	Amruta Khanvilkar	Nominated	
Maharashtracha Favourite Kon?	20 January 2023	Favourite Villain	Milind Shinde	Nominated	
Zee Chitra Gaurav Puraskar	13 March 2023	Best Art Director	Satish Chipkar, Rakesh Kadam, Sachin Patil	Won	
Zee Chitra Gaurav Puraskar	13 March 2023	Best Costume	Nachiket Barve	Won	
Filmfare Awards Marathi	30 March 2023	Best Actor	Sharad Kelkar	Nominated	
Filmfare Awards Marathi	30 March 2023	Best Costume	Nachiket Barve	Nominated	
Maharashtra State Film Awards	5 August 2025	Best Film III	Har Har Mahadev	Won	
Maharashtra State Film Awards	5 August 2025	Best Director III	Abhijeet Deshpande	Won	
Maharashtra State Film Awards	5 August 2025	Best Supporting Actor	Subodh Bhave	Nominated	
Maharashtra State Film Awards	5 August 2025	Best Music Director	Hitesh Modak	Nominated	
Maharashtra State Film Awards	5 August 2025	Best Sound Mixing	Lochan Kanvinde	Won	
