= Dashami (film) =

2026 Marathi-language crime thriller film

- Directed by: Yogesh Bhosale
- Written by: Suresh Pandit
- Produced by: Yogesh Bhosale
- Starring: Makarand Anaspure; Gauri Ingawale; Ravi Prakash
- Cinematography: Vikas Singh
- Edited by: Vinay Shinde
- Music by: Suresh Pandit
- Production company: KNK Box
- Distributed by: August Entertainment
- Release date: 23 October 2026
- Running time: 139 minutes
- Country: India
- Language: Marathi

Dashami (lit. 'The Tenth Day') is a 2026 Indian Marathi-language crime mystery thriller film directed and produced by Yogesh Bhosale under the banner of KNK Box. The film stars Makarand Anaspure, Gauri Ingawale and Ravi Prakash in lead roles, with the story and music composed by Suresh Pandit. Set in Pune, it follows a police inspector investigating a string of murders that lead him to revisit a previously closed rape case.

The film was theatrically released on 23 October 2026, during the week of Vijayadashami. It received mixed-to-positive reviews from critics but performed poorly at the box office.

== Plot ==
Prabhakar Desai is a hospital ward boy in Pune who struggles to support his family on a small salary but dreams of seeing his daughter Lakshmi become a doctor. Lakshmi's life is upended when she is raped, and the case collapses after a falsified medical report, leaving her boyfriend Vasu in jail as the accused.

Some time later, the city is shaken by a series of murders. After the third victim, pathology lab owner Dinesh Mehta, is found dead, Inspector Asif Mujavar is assigned to the case. His investigation leads him to reopen Lakshmi's case, in which suspicion falls on Vasu and on Bunty, the son of local MLA Anand Mhatre. As the probe continues, auto rickshaw driver Malhar and Bunty are also killed.

It is eventually revealed that Malhar was the first to assault Lakshmi, after which she was raped by Bunty and two of his friends. Lakshmi, who had been feigning a coma, is revealed to be the killer: she murdered Bunty's two friends, the lab owner who had produced the false report, and finally Bunty and Malhar.

== Cast ==
- Makarand Anaspure as Prabhakar Desai
- Gauri Ingawale as Lakshmi Desai
- Ravi Prakash as Inspector Asif Mujavar
- Mahesh Manjrekar as MLA Anand Mhatre
- Vijay Nikam as Malhar, an auto rickshaw driver
- Devendra Gaikwad as Jawalkar, a suspended police inspector
- Raaj Kundan as Vasu, Lakshmi's boyfriend
- Yogesh Bhosale as Bunty Mhatre
- Prasanna Ketkar as Police Commissioner Sudhanshu Roy
- Sham Mashalkar as Dinesh Mehta, a pathology lab owner
- Sandesh Jadhav
- Shivraj Walvekar
- Sheetal Ahirrao
- Prem Narsale
- Prasad Khaire
- Vivek Yadav

== Production ==
The director linked Vijayadashami's theme of good triumphing over evil with social issues, particularly injustice against women, describing the film as a suspense-crime thriller.

The film marked the second on-screen pairing of Makarand Anaspure and Gauri Ingawale as father and daughter, following De Dhakka 2. Telugu actor Ravi Prakash was cast in a key role, making his debut in Marathi cinema.

== Soundtrack ==
Dashami

Soundtrack album by Suresh Pandit
- Released: 2026
- Genre: Feature film soundtrack
- Length: 13:21
- Language: Marathi
- Label: Video Palace

The music was composed by Suresh Pandit, with Avi Lohar contributing the background score, while choreography was handled by Sujit Kumar and Phulwa Khamkar. The song "Chandika Ho" received a positive response.

Track listing
No.	Title	Lyrics	Singer(s)	Length
1.	"Jagi Ho Ga Maay"	Suresh Pandit	Shanmukha Priya	3:43
2.	"Buri Nazarwale"	Vaibhav Deshmukh	Nakash Aziz	2:59
3.	"Chandika Ho"	Suresh Pandit	Jasraj Jayant Joshi	3:11
4.	"Kalij Dhad Dhadla"	Suresh Pandit	Aarya Ambekar, Onkarswaroop	3:28
Total length:				13:21

== Release ==
The first poster of Dashami was unveiled in August 2026, with the makers announcing an October release. Character details of Makarand Anaspure and Gauri Ingawale were revealed in September, followed by the release of the official trailer in October. The film was released theatrically on 23 October 2026, during the week of Vijayadashami.

== Reception ==
=== Critical response ===
Santosh Bhingarde of Sakal rated the film 3.5 out of 5 stars, writing, "Some things are illogical, but this is a film that gives new strength and new energy to female power to stand against injustice." Critic Kapil Deshpande criticised the film's fast pacing but noted, " Bhosale has blended the present and the past well in the film."

=== Box office ===
Dashami received a limited theatrical release, earning approximately ₹4 lakh net on its opening day and around ₹33 lakh net in its first week.
