= Gauri Ingawale =

Indian actress

Gauri Ingawale is an Indian actress who works in Marathi films. She is known for her films like Panghrun, 3:56 Killari, De Dhakka 2, and Hi Anokhi Gaath.

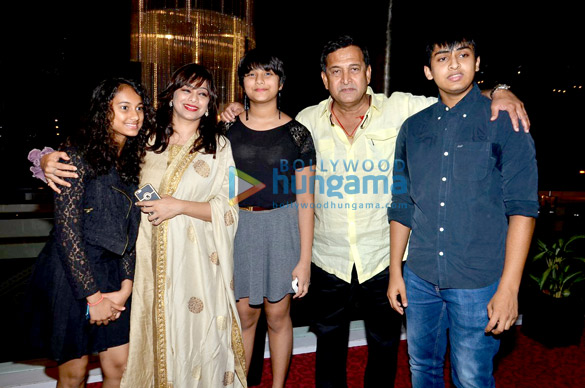
Gauri Ingawale (L) with family

== Early life and family ==
Gauri is the stepdaughter of director Mahesh Manjrekar. She is the daughter of Medha Manjrekar. Because of this, Gauri uses her father's surname. She wanted to pursue a career in dance, but on Mahesh Manjrekar's suggestion, she chose to do acting. She completed her education at Nalanda University. Gauri has one sister from her father, Gargi Kulkarni, and also shares siblings Saiee, Ashwami and Satya from Mahesh Manjrekar.

== Filmography ==
=== Film ===
Key
†	Denotes films that have not yet been released

Year	Title	Role	Notes	Ref.
2012	Kaksparsh			
2012	Kutumb	Laxmi Solkar		
2015	3:56 Killari	Sharayu		
2022	Panghrun	Laxmi	Debut (lead actress)	
2022	De Dhakka 2	Sayali		
2024	Hi Anokhi Gaath	Aamla		
2025	Punha Shivajiraje Bhosale	Cameo		
2026	Dashami	Lakshmi Desai		
2027	Vedat Marathe Veer Daudle Saat †	TBA		
TBA	Niravadhi †	TBA		

=== Theatre ===
Year	Title	Role	Ref.
2018	Ovee	Ovee	

=== Television ===
Year	Title	Role	Ref.
2010	Chak Dhoom Dhoom	Contestant	
2026–present	Pathrakhin	Bhagyshri Vaidya	

== Awards ==
Year	Award	Category	Nominated work	Result	Ref.
2022	Filmfare Awards Marathi	Best Female Debut (Note: Shared with Hruta Durgule)	Panghrun	Won	
