= Nay Varanbhat Loncha Kon Nay Koncha =

2022 Indian Marathi-language film

- Theatrical release poster
- Directed by: Mahesh Manjrekar
- Screenplay by: Mahesh Manjrekar
- Story by: Jayant Pawar
- Produced by: Narendra Hirawat; Shreyans Hirawat; Vijay Shinde
- Starring: Prem Dharmadhikari; Nupur Dudhwadkar; Chhaya Kadam; Ganesh Yadav
- Cinematography: Karan B. Rawat
- Edited by: Mahesh Manjrekar
- Music by: Hitesh Modak
- Production companies: NH Studioz; Nintynine productions
- Release date: 14 January 2022
- Running time: 112 minutes
- Country: India
- Language: Marathi

Nay Varanbhat Loncha Kon Nay Koncha is a 2022 Indian Marathi-language crime film written and directed by Mahesh Manjrekar, produced by Shreyans Hirawat under the banner of NH Studioz. It was theatrically released on 14 January 2022.

== Plot ==
The film starts at late night with two teenagers in their early teens, Digambar (alias Digya) and Illiyas, cornering a drunk man in his fifties, Gupta, and stabbing him. Digya threatens Gupta that he will pull his guts out unless he complies with him. They take him to his home at knifepoint and make him call Shirya and tell him that his rent receipt is ready and he should collect it immediately because he would be leaving the town early morning. Once the call is done, Digya kills him.

Shirya and his wife Supriya are excited that they are finally receiving the rent receipt and immediately reach Gupta's place, where they are trapped by Digya and Illiyas, who brutally murder them. The film then shifts to four months before this event. Digya is a happy-go-lucky boy who likes to fool around with his friend Illiyas while bunking off school. He lives with his grandmother, whom he calls Baye (slang for "lady"), who is a little-educated but sharp-witted and outspoken. She deeply cares for him and also fears that Digya would become like his father, who was a feared gangster and had killed several people and was later killed through betrayal by someone close to him. They live in an impoverished tenement and their source of income is boiled eggs that Baye sells. Her neighbour Babi, who is in his late fifties, is compassionate towards her. However, he has to care for his wife who is mentally ill, and he has to do all her chores. His only daughter had earlier run away with her lover. However, her lover threw her out after he lost his job and, now she lives with her father. Shirya is a nephew of Baye who lives with her with his wife Supriya with the condition that he has to pay for the rent and household expenses. Baye, although fond of Shirya, hates Supriya.

The owner of their tenement has decided to go for a redevelopment project where the existing tenants would get a small apartment of their ownership in the new project. On getting this news, Baye's elder son Mahadev comes to visit him after a long time. Mahadev, unlike his brother, is educated with a white-collar job and had earlier broken all links with his mother and brother and lives a comfortable life with his wife and son Akshu. He demands a share in the new apartment from Baye. However, she admonishes him and tells him that the only person who will inherit the new apartment is Digya.

Meanwhile, Shirya has bribed local Corporator Gawade through a broker, Gupta, with Rs. 2 lakh to change the name on the rent receipt so that he will be eligible for compensation instead of Baye. Gawade treats Baye as his mother as she had raised him in his early days. Moreover, Digya's father Sanjay was his henchman, and it was through him that he achieved political clout and power. The deal with Shirya is that he has to pay 5 lakhs in total to him and relocate Baye to her village home, which Shirya has to renovate. Coincidently, Baye witnesses the deal and, in a scuffle with Gawade, she hits the ground and dies. Gawade covers up Baye's killing as a natural death through a doctor who issues a fake death certificate. After her death, Mahadev and Gawade strike a deal with Shirya in which he has to give some money to Mahadev in return for Mahadev taking care of Digya. At Mahadev's home, he is treated like a servant and faces mental and physical abuse. One day, Digya snaps under pressure and abducts Akshu with the help of his friend Illiyas. He then lures Mahadev to an isolated place and kills them both. No one suspects Digya as he is very young. A few days later, Digya and his aunt enter into a passionate sexual relationship and his aunt treats him like her lover. One day, Digya tells his aunt that he and Illiyas are going to a fair. However, they kill Gupta, Shirya, and Supriya as shown in the first scene.

One day, Gawade trashes his current henchman Bhattya because he has siphoned off money from him. Bhattya gets drunk, confesses everything to Illiyas in a drunk state, and tells him that Gawade had betrayed Digya's father, that he accidentally killed Baye, and that he will cut Gawade into pieces the next day. This news is relayed to Gawade by Digya. Enraged, Gawade goes with him and kills Bhattya; later, Digya and Illiyas kill him.

The next day, Digya leaves his aunt's place as he wants to take a break from the city and move with Babi to his native village along with Illiyas. As they settle at Babi's place, one day, while they are resting, Digya explains to Babi how he and Illiyas killed everyone, with great delight. Babi cannot come to terms with this and is deeply scared of Digya. His voice rings in his ears continuously and he suddenly wakes up in the middle of the night and finds that he is alone. He then witnesses Digya having sex with his daughter and he returns silently. The next day he poisons Digya, Illiyas and his daughter.

== Cast ==
- Prem Dharmadhikari as Digya (Digamber Chalke)
- Rohit Haldikar as Shirya
- Nupur Dudhwadkar as Yakub
- Shashank Shende as Babi
- Savita Malpekar as Laxmi Babi's wife
- Chhaya Kadam as Bay Bikaji Chalke
- Ganesh Yadav as Bhaktya
- Dhananjay Mandrekar as Inspector
- Umesh Jagtap as Shantya Gawade
- Atul Kale as Mahadev Bikaji Chalke
- Kashmera Shah as Supriya
- Ganesh Revdekar as Gupta
- Ashwini Kulkarni as Kaki (Digya Lover & sexual relationship Partner)
- Isha Divekar as Malu (Digya Child Love, Physical Friend & Babi Daughter)

== Reception ==
=== Critical reception ===
Kalpeshraj Kubal of Maharashtra Times rate 3.5 out of five and wrote "Its scenes are very dark and inflammatory; It brings a kind of sadness. But the commentary from it is very important."

Mihir Bhanage of The Times of India gave 2.5 out of five and wrote, "The film takes a Quentin Tarantino-like approach, not just in terms of content and violence, but also with the non-linear treatment it gets. But it reveals more than its able to hide making story predictable.

== Controversy ==
The chairperson of National Commission for Women (NCW) has written to the Ministry of Information and Broadcasting (I&B) to censor the trailer of the film. In a statement, NCW said it had received a complaint from Bharatiya Stree Shakti that the film's trailer contained content that 'depicted women and minors in an offensive manner'.
