= Hi Anokhi Gaath =

2024 Marathi-language film directed by Mahesh Manjrekar

- Theatrical release poster
- Directed by: Mahesh Manjrekar
- Written by: Mahesh Manjrekar; Siddharth Salvi
- Starring: Shreyas Talpade; Gauri Ingawale
- Cinematography: Karan B. Rawat
- Edited by: Satish Padwal
- Music by: Hitesh Modak
- Production companies: Zee Studios; Mahesh Manjrekar Movies
- Release date: 1 March 2024
- Running time: 126 minutes
- Country: India
- Language: Marathi

Hi Anokhi Gaath (transl. This Unique Bond) is a 2024 Marathi-language romantic drama film written and directed by Mahesh Manjrekar and produced under Zee Studios and Mahesh Manjrekar Movies. The film stars Shreyas Talpade and Gauri Ingawale in the lead roles. The film follows the story of a newlywed man who discovers that their marriage was against his wife's will, and she is in love with another man, and decides to unite them.

The film was released in theatres on 1 March 2024 and received a positive to mixed response from critics.

== Plot ==
Shreeniwas (Shreyas Talpade) lives with his mother (Suhas Joshi). His mother is very sick with cancer and wants him to get married quickly. He's supposed to marry Aditi (Deepti Lele), but she dies before the wedding. Aditi's father (Sharad Ponkshe) then suggests that Shreeniwas marry Aditi's younger sister, Aamla (Gauri Ingawale), even though Aamla wants to be an actress and isn't ready for marriage. Aamla and Shreeniwas end up getting married.

Aamla isn't happy in her marriage and often talks to Rohit (Rishi Saxena), a cameraman who loves her. Aamla doesn't love Rohit back, but she thinks he can help her become an actress. When Shreeniwas realizes Aamla isn't happy with him, he decides to let her be with Rohit.

Aamla meets Rohit's parents and convinces them to let her marry Rohit. The day Rohit and Aamla's wedding is planned, Rohit doesn't show up. Aamla in a fit of rage spills wine on Rohit's kurta and goes to Sreenivas's office. Both Sreenivas and Aamla go to Sreenivas' house. Rohit then shows up and tries to win back Aamla but she refuses and slaps him. The movie ends with Sreenivas and Aamla smiling and going inside the house.

== Cast ==
- Shreyas Talpade as Shreeniwas
- Gauri Ingawale as Aamla
- Rishi Saxena as Rohit; Aamla's love interest
- Suhas Joshi as Shreenivas's mother
- Deepti Lele as Aditi; Aamla's elder sister
- Sharad Ponkshe as Aamla and Aditi's father
- Purnima Manohar as Aamla and Aditi's mother
- Isha Divekar as Shweta; Aamla's friend
- Surabhi Bhave as Meenal
- Shailesh Datar as Rohit's father
- Radhika Harshe Vidyasagar as Rohit's mother

== Production ==
This is the first collaboration between Manjrekar and Talpade.

== Soundtrack ==
The soundtrack had lyrics by Vaibhav Joshi and Mandar Cholkar, and music by Hitesh Modak. Voices on the soundtrack include those of Hitesh Modak, Salman Ali, Priyanka Barve, Vijay Prakash, Bela Shende and Vibhavari Apte. The first song "Me RaanBhar" was released on the occasion of Valentine's Day.

Track listing
No.	Title	Singer(s)	Length
1.	"Sakhi Maze Dehbhaan"	Hitesh Modak, Salman Ali	3:56
2.	"Nate Salte Ka"	Hitesh Modak, Vijay Prakash	5:24
3.	"Mrugtrushna"	Hitesh Modak, Priyanka Barve	3:33
4.	"Me RaanBhar"	Hitesh Modak, Bela Shende	3:36
5.	"Mushaphira"	Hitesh Modak, Vibhavari Apte	4:53
Total length:			22:25

== Release ==
Hi Anokhi Gaath was official announced on 2 February 2024. The official trailer of the film was released on 12 February 2024.

== Reception ==
=== Critical response ===
Reviewing the film for Film Information, the critic described it as derivative of Hum Dil De Chuke Sanam and found the screenplay effective only in parts, while praising Gauri Ingawale's performance and dancing. Sanjay Gavare of Lokmat gave the film 3 out of 5 stars, observing, "The story of dramatic twists and turns, with a tangle of relationships, increases the excitement moment by moment."

=== Accolades ===
Award	Date	Category	Recipient	Result	Ref
Zee Chitra Gaurav Puraskar	2025	Best Actor	Shreyas Talpade	Nominated	
Filmfare Awards Marathi	2025	Best Playback Singer – Female	Priyanka Barve (Song: Mrugtrushna)	Nominated	
