= Rohit Phalke =

Indian actor

- Occupation: Actor
- Years active: 2012–present

Rohit Phalke (born 10 October 1997) is an Indian actor. He made his debut with Balak-Palak film in Marathi cinema.

== Career ==
Phalke has acted in Marathi movie Balak-Palak and also in a show on Star Pravah named Be Dune Daha. He has also written and directed a short film named 'Dadu' which is based on a father-daughter relationship.

Rohit has played one of the three leading roles in the Marathi movie Manjha, directed by Jatin Wagle, alongside Ashwini Bhave. He received the Dr. Kashinath Ghanekar Award from the Government of Maharashtra for his role as Jaideep/JD.

He was recently seen in the Marathi Film "Panghrun" released in 2022.

He formerly worked at MIT Vishwashanti Gurukul, an IB School in Pune as an economics, TOK, and integrated humanities teacher and EE Supervisor, before moving to Good Shepherd International School, in Ooty as an IGCSE and IBDP Economics Teacher.

== Filmography ==
Year	Title	Role	Ref.
2012	Balak Palak	Avya/Avinash Gandhe	
2014	Dadu	Writer, director	
2017	Manjha	Jaideep	
2020	Strawberry Shake	Soham	
2021	Antim: The Final Truth	Arun Nanaware	
2022	Panghrun	Madhava	

== Television ==
Year	Title	Role	Channel
2014	Be Dune Daha	Neil Bapat	Star Pravah
2021	Tu Saubhagyawati Ho	Rishabh Jadhav	Sony Marathi

== Mythology ==
On 1 October 2021, Rohit started a research project 'The Purāṇa Project'.
