= De Dhakka =

- VCD cover
- Directed by: Atul Kale; Sudesh Manjrekar
- Written by: Mahesh Manjrekar
- Produced by: Ashwami Manjrekar
- Starring: Makarand Anaspure; Shivaji Satam; Siddarth Jadhav; Medha Manjrekar; Saksham Kulkarni; Gauri Vaidya
- Cinematography: Shailesh Awasthi
- Edited by: Rahul Bhatankar
- Music by: Atul Kale; Ajit Parab; Samir
- Production companies: Satya Films; Zee Talkies
- Release date: 16 May 2008
- Country: India
- Language: Marathi
- Budget: ₹1.2 crore (Note: According to The Economic Times, the film was made on a budget of ₹1.2 crore with an additional ₹45 lakh marketing cost.)
- Box office: ₹10 crore

De Dhakka (transl. Give a push) is a 2008 Indian Marathi-language comedy drama film directed by Atul Kale and Sudesh Manjrekar. It is based on the 2006 American film Little Miss Sunshine, the film's story revolves around a lower-class family. The film stars Makarand Anaspure, Shivaji Satam, Medha Manjrekar, Siddharth Jadhav, Saksham Kulkarni, and Gauri Vaidya.

A sequel to the film, titled De Dhakka 2, digitally premiered on the streaming platform ZEE5 on 24 March 2023.

== Plot ==
The story revolves around the Jadhav family. Makarand, after spending all his wealth, has invented an auto part which he claims will drastically lower the fuel consumption of vehicles. But being from a rural background and having no formal education, he is never taken seriously. Suryabhan, Makarand's father, leaves no opportunity to blame his son for selling all his land on failed pursuits. Sumti is Makarand's humble second wife. Dhanaji is Makarand's petty thief brother-in-law, who is a kleptomaniac. Sayali and Kisna are Makarand's children. While Sayali has a passion for dance, Kisna wishes to be a wrestler. While the family is going through an economic crisis, a golden opportunity is presented when Makarand's daughter Sayali is selected for the final round of a dance competition with a huge prize money. The family scrapes their last resources and leaves on a life changing journey to reach the competition venue. Since railway tickets are not available, Dhanaji arranges for a rickshaw to take the family to Mumbai. While on the way to Mumbai, the family is intercepted by the police who reveal that Dhanaji actually stole the rickshaw and gagged the driver to a tree. Makarand, in a bid to save his family from arrest, snatches the officer's gun and threatens him on gunpoint. The officer reluctantly lets them go after taking an undertaking that they will appear in the police station after their job is done. Further on the way, the rickshaw's clutch plate gets damaged, forcing the gang to push the rickshaw every time it needs to be started. On one such occasion, Kisna falls down unconscious while pushing the rickshaw. After a medical examination, the doctor reveals that he is suffering from asthma. Kisna, in a fit of rage and out of shame, runs out of the rickshaw, claiming that he won't wrestle. Sumi slaps and angrily reprimands her son for being a coward and running away from his weakness. Further during a night halt, the duo of musicians accompanying them angrily leave due to non-payment of their dues. In a heated moment, Makarand blames both Dhanaji and Sumi for being the cause of his troubles but soon realises his mistake and asks for forgiveness. But the biggest calamity befalls on the Jadhav family when Suryabhan gets a heart attack on the way. The family has him admitted in a hospital where the doctors reveal that he has slipped into a coma, due to his heavy alcohol consumption. The family decides to leave for Mumbai instead of weeping in the hospital.

Upon reaching Mumbai, Dhanaji accidentally breaks the harmonium of the musician. Makarand and Kisna, after witnessing the level of competition, try to dissuade Sayali from participating, out of fear of losing. But the makeup artist encourages them to let Sayali participate. Meanwhile Suryabhan awakens from his coma and runs away from the hospital to reunite with his family. Sayali participates in the dance competition and comes in third after a thunderous applause from the audience.

After the family returns home, Makarand is shocked to find out that a client, whom he had offered the auto part to has illegally copied his invention and marketed it as his own. Dhanaji then reveals that he had actually sold that part to arrange for money to buy a new harmonium. The family angrily reprimands Dhanaji for his nature and deed, but Makarand realises that whatever he did was for Sayali's own good. He forgives him and resolves to start life afresh.

Next day, while leaving for work, his friend Amar who had introduced him to that client reveals to him that he had actually got his auto part patented 6 months back. Yesterday when that client proclaimed on TV that he has invented that part, his team contacted him and sent him a legal notice of having stolen the part. The patent documents also proved that Makarand is the real inventor. His friend reveals that the client is coming with the royalty money of Rs 1 crore. The family rejoices as the credits roll.

== Cast ==
- Shivaji Satam as Suryabhan Jadhav
- Makarand Anaspure as Makarand Suryabhan Jadhav
- Siddhartha Jadhav as Dhanajirao (Dhanaji/Dhanya)
- Medha Manjrekar as Sumati Jadhav (Sumi)
- Saksham Kulkarni as Kisna Makrand Jadhav
- Gauri Vaidya as Sayali Makrand Jadhav
- Hrishikesh Joshi as Musician
- Abhijeet Deshpande as Amar
- Sanjay Khapre as Nachya
- Mukta Barve as Special appearance in the song
- Sachit Patil as Dance Show Host (In Mumbai)
- Vineet Kumar Singh as Jai Sinha
- Atul Kale as Dhanaji's Doctor
- Kamlakar Satpute as Makeup Artist
- Dhananjay Mandrekar as Inspector

== Accolades ==
- MFK Award for Favourite Film
- Arati Ankalikar-Tikekar received the Maharashtra State Film Award, the V. Shantaram Award and the Maharashtra Times Award for Best Playback Singer.

== Soundtrack ==
No.	Title	Lyrics	Music	Singer(s)	Length
1.	"De Dhakka"	Shrirang Godbole, Abhijeet Deshpande	Ajit-Atul-Sameer	Arati Ankalikar-Tikekar, Kunal Ganjawala	7:16
2.	"Ugavali Shukrachi Chandani"	Shrirang Godbole, Abhijeet Deshpande	Ajit-Atul-Sameer	Arati Ankalikar-Tikekar	5:03
3.	"Chum Chum Payee"	Shrirang Godbole, Abhijeet Deshpande	Ajit-Atul-Sameer	Arati Ankalikar-Tikekar	3:33
4.	"Aai Ude Ga Ambabai"	Shrirang Godbole, Abhijeet Deshpande	Ajit-Atul-Sameer	Ajay Gogavale	1:53
5.	"Vaat Chalavi Chalavi"	Shrirang Godbole, Abhijeet Deshpande	Ajit-Atul-Sameer	Ajay Gogavale	1:09
Total length:					14:25

== Remakes ==
It was remade in Kannada as Crazy Kutumba (2010). A Hindi remake is under production, with Sanjay Dutt will play the father character.

== Sequel ==
A sequel to the film, titled De Dhakka 2, was announced in 2020. It is directed by Mahesh Manjrekar and Sudesh Manjrekar, under the banner of Ameya Vinod Khopkar Entertainment and Skylink Entertainment.
