= The Power (2021 Indian film) =

2021 film by Mahesh Manjrekar

- Official release poster
- Directed by: Mahesh Manjrekar
- Written by: Mahesh Manjrekar Siddharth Salvi
- Produced by: Vijay Galani; Pratik Galani; Dhaval Jayantilal Gada; Aksshay Jayantilal Gada
- Starring: Vidyut Jammwal; Shruti Haasan; Mahesh Manjrekar; Jisshu Sengupta; Sachin Khedekar; Medha Manjrekar; Zakir Hussain; Prateik Babbar; Yuvika Chaudhary
- Cinematography: Rakesh Rawat
- Edited by: Sarvesh Parab
- Music by: Salim–Sulaiman
- Production companies: Pen Studios; Galani Entertainments
- Distributed by: Zee Plex
- Release date: 14 January 2021 (India)
- Country: India
- Language: Hindi

The Power is a 2021 Indian Hindi-language action thriller film directed by Mahesh Manjrekar and produced by Pen India Limited and Galani Entertainments. It stars Vidyut Jammwal, Mahesh Manjrekar, Shruti Haasan, Zakir Hussain, Sonal Chauhan, Medha Manjrekar, Prateik Babbar, Sachin Khedekar and Jisshu Sengupta.

The Power was released on the online streaming service Zee Plex on 14 January 2021 and received mixed reviews from critics.

== Plot ==
Set in 2004–2007, Devidas "Devi" Thakur is the youngest son of crime lord Kalidas Thakur, who arrives home from Singapore for his mother Uma's birthday. Devi wants nothing to do with the family business and is in love with his childhood friend Parveen alias Pari, who is the daughter of his father's close associate Anwar. When Kalidas refuses to get involved in smuggling drugs with another drug lord, Francis D'costa, an assassination attempt is made on him, and Anwar becomes the suspect. Before proving his innocence, Anwar is killed by Kalidas's son-in-law Ranjeet Venkat Shankarnarayanan. Pari vows to avenge his death and swears on her unborn child that she will wipe out the entire Thakur bloodline, including Devi.

While Kalidas is in a coma, Devi takes over Kalidas' business and shuts down their illegal activities. He kills Francis for attacking his father. Pari sides with Kalidas' rival Vishambhar Rana and sets out to annihilate the Thakur family. Ranjeet, who wants to take over Kalidas' position, sides with Rana to finish Kalidas, Devi and his brother Ramdas Thakur. Ranjeet gets thrashed by Ramdas for thrashing his wife and Ramdas's sister Rathna, where Ranjeet traps and kills Ramdas with a chainsaw. During a resulting gang war, Kalidas fakes his death and learns about Ranjeet and Rana's involvement in Anwar and Ramdas' death.

Rana makes Pari assume that Devi kidnapped her child Ishan, where Pari and Rana heads to the shrine where Devi is completing Kalidas' fake ritual. Despite injuries, Devi finishes Rana and clears the misunderstandings with Pari. Devi soon dies to his injuries, where Pari gets devastated and dies with him. Kalidas, Uma, Rathna and Ranjeet leave for Goa. Kalidas reveals Ranjeet's wrongdoings and Rathna kills him, where they burn down their car and leave to another city to start a new life.

== Cast ==
- Vidyut Jammwal as Devidas Thakur (Kaalidas' 2nd son)
- Shruti Haasan as Parveen / Pari (Devidas' Wife)
- Mahesh Manjrekar as Kaalidas Haridas Thakur
- Jisshu Sengupta as Ramdas Thakur (Kaalidas' 1st son)
- Zakir Hussain as Anwar (Pari's father)
- Sachin Khedekar as Vishambhar Rana
- Sonal Chauhan as Chandini (Devidas' love-interest)
- Medha Manjrekar as Uma Kaalidas Thakur (KAalidas' wife)
- Prateik Babbar as Ranjeet Venkat Shankarnarayanan (Ratna's husband)
- Mrunmayee Deshpande as Ratna Thakur (Kaalidas' daughter)
- Sudhanshu Pandey as Rocky (Thakur families enemy)
- Yuvika Chaudhary as Shaila Thakur (Ranjeet's sister and Ramdas' wife)
- Salil Ankola as Robert (Thakuri families' enemy)
- Sameer Dharmadhikari as Francis Dcosta
- Chetan Hansraj as Fakira
- Aham Sharma as Charlie
- Vidyadhar Joshi as Bhau
- Savita Malpekar as Thakur's Maid
- Ganesh Yadav as Potya
- Ajay Purkar as Anna

== Reception ==
The Power received mixed reviews from critics with praise for its acting, action sequences and technical aspects, but criticised its pace, script and direction.

=== Critical response ===
Pallabi Dey Purkayastha of The Times of India gave 2.5/5 stars and wrote "With a tighter, finer screenplay and more consistent performers, The Power could have been a befitting response of this decade to the Sarkar franchise, but a lacklustre narrative, among other things, brings the power down to level zero." Joginder Tuteja of Rediff gave 2.5/5 stars and noted "If the film had been crisper with solid drama in the second half too, The Power could have been more powerful." Anna M. M. Vetticad of Firstpost gave 1.75/5 stars and wrote "'The Power' is engaging to begin with, but as it rolls along it becomes clear that it falls in the ‘if you’ve seen one, you’ve seen ’em all’ category of underworld dramas." Samrudhi Ghosh of Hindustan Times wrote "The Power, with its creative bankruptcy, brings nothing new to already done-to-death iterations of The Godfather.

== Music ==
The Power

Soundtrack album by Salim–Sulaiman
- Released: 21 January 2021
- Genre: Feature film soundtrack
- Length: 5:47
- Language: Hindi
- Label: Zee Music Company

Salim–Sulaiman chronology
Coolie No.1 (2020)	The Power (2021)

Official audio
- The Power - Full Album on YouTube

The music for the film was composed by Salim–Sulaiman with lyrics written by Kumaar . The single "Oh Saaiyaan" was sung by Arijit Singh and Raj Pandit while the female version was sung by Aishwarya Pandit.

No.	Title	Lyrics	Music	Singer(s)	Length
1.	"Oh Saaiyaan"	Kumaar	Salim–Sulaiman	Arijit Singh, Raj Pandit	3:21
2.	"Oh Saaiyaan (Female Version)"	Kumaar	Salim–Sulaiman	Aishwarya Pandit	2:26
Total length:					5:47
