= Me Shivaji Park =

2018 Marathi language film

- Theatrical release poster
- Directed by: Mahesh Manjrekar
- Written by: Abhiram Bhadkamkar (Dialogues)
- Screenplay by: Mahesh Manjrekar
- Produced by: Dilip Sahebrao Yadav; Siddharth Kevalchand Jain
- Starring: Ashok Saraf; Vikram Gokhale; Dilip Prabhavalkar; Shivaji Satam; Satish Alekar
- Cinematography: Karan B. Rawat
- Edited by: Sarvesh Parab
- Music by: Ajit Parab
- Production companies: Mahesh Manjrekar Movies; Gauri Pictures
- Release date: 18 October 2018
- Running time: 125 minutes
- Country: India
- Language: Marathi

Me Shivaji Park (transl. I am Shivaji Park) is a 2018 Indian Marathi-language crime thriller film directed by Mahesh Manjrekar and produced by Gauri Pictures in association with Manjrekar Movies. The film starring Ashok Saraf, Vikram Gokhale, Shivaji Satam, Satish Alekar, Dilip Prabhavalkar in the leading roles. The film was theatrically released on 18 October 2018.

== Cast ==
- Ashok Saraf as Digambar Sawant
- Shivaji Satam as Rustum Mistry
- Dilip Prabhavalkar as Professor Dilip Pradhan
- Satish Alekar as Satish Joshi
- Vikram Gokhale as Judge Vikram Rajadhyakshya
- Bharti Achrekar as Binny Rustum Mistry
- Manjari Fadnis as Aishwarya Nair
- Sharad Ponkshe as Harshad Vedant
- Suhas Joshi as Mrs. Vikram Rajadhyaksha
- Santosh Juvekar as Harish Vedant
- Uday Tikekar as Balwa Seth
- Savita Malpekar as Savita Joshi
- Dipti Lele as Reporter
- Shushant Shelar
- Abhijeet Satam
- Madhura Velankar as Meena Gawli
- Pravin Tarde as Young Sawant

== Release ==
=== Theatrical ===
Me Shivaji Park was released on 18 October 2018 in theatres.

=== Home media ===
The film is originally available on ZEE5 and Mx Player.

== Reception ==
=== Critical reception ===
Kalpeshraj Kubal of Maharashtra Times gave 3 out of 5 and wrote "first half of the movie seems a little choppy and more dramatic, it keeps the audience glued to their seats. The movie is looks like One time watch." Prajakta Chitnis of Lokmat also rated 3 out of 5 and she too would write that the film holds the audience well till the interval, but after the interval the film becomes too much of a stretch. However, she said that the film is worth watching once. Keyur Seta of Cinestaan gave 4 stars and praised performances of actors. Mayuri Phadnis of The Times of India gave 3 out of 5 and praised performances, incredible story and screenplay.
