= Antim: The Final Truth =

2021 Indian film by Mahesh Manjrekar

- Theatrical release poster
- Directed by: Mahesh Manjrekar
- Written by: Mahesh Manjrekar; Abhijeet Deshpande; Siddharth Salvi
- Story by: Pravin Tarde
- Based on: Mulshi Pattern by Pravin Tarde
- Produced by: Salman Khan
- Starring: Salman Khan; Aayush Sharma; Mahima Makwana; Jisshu Sengupta; Waluscha De Sousa
- Cinematography: Karan B. Rawat
- Edited by: Bunty Nagi
- Music by: Ravi Basrur; Hitesh Modak
- Production company: Salman Khan Films
- Distributed by: Zee Studios
- Release date: 26 November 2021
- Running time: 135 minutes
- Country: India
- Language: Hindi
- Budget: ₹40–48 crore
- Box office: est. ₹59.11 crore

Antim: The Final Truth is a 2021 Indian Hindi action film directed by Mahesh Manjrekar and produced by Salman Khan Films. Distributed by Zee Studios, it is a remake of the Marathi film Mulshi Pattern, and stars Salman Khan, Aayush Sharma, Mahima Makwana and Jisshu Sengupta. The story revolves around the face-off between a Sikh police officer (Salman Khan) and a gangster (Aayush Sharma), and like the original, it explores the hard conditions faced by farmers that pushes some of them towards crime.

The film was theatrically released worldwide on 26 November 2021.

== Plot ==
The narrative is about a common farmer's life, where he is forced to sell his land and work as a farm laborer in his own land. One such story revolves around Rahul "Rahulya" Patil. His father, Dattaram also had sold his land and is living as a watchman in his own land. One day, the landlord, Shinde, beats up Dattaram and Rahulya challenges that he would get back his land. Soon, his family shifts to Pune, where both the father-son duo work as porters in a vegetable market. One day, the local goons forcibly extort money from an old man, Rahulya beats them up and lands in jail. There, he meets Nanya, a powerful gangster with the local MLA's support. Rahulya joins hands with Nanya after being released from jail. Meanwhile, he also falls in love with Manda, a tea seller.

Rahulya soon earns his name after accidentally murdering the Mayor and Nanya bails him out again, by fabricating the murder as suicide with false testimonials from the witnesses. Rahulya, with his new fame, sets out to solve the vegetable vendors's problems by promising that he would buy their products at rates more than the current prices. Though he is appreciated by the vendors, Dattaram rejects him. Soon, Rahulya is a prominent member in Nanya's gang. One day, Pitya and Daya complain to Nanya that they failed to annex land owned by Rahulya's Teacher. Rahulya settles his own personal score and annexes the land by shooting Masterji in front of his family. Nanya bails him out by producing masterji's uncle as the killer. Rahulya is completely disowned by his family and is thrown out of his home. Though Manda is apprehensive of Rahul, she believes that he is innocent. One day, Nanya invites Rahulya to his birthday party; in a twist, Rahulya murders him that night, believing that he sexually predated his mother and sister. SI Rajveer Singh, witnesses the murder and puts Rahulya behind bars after a physical brawl. After several months, he comes out on bail.

Rahulya is now the gangster of the town and everyone fears him. One night, a pre-teenager Siddharth aka Sidhu comes to meet Rahulya for help and Rahulya adopts him as his brother. Meanwhile, Rajveer takes pity on Rahulya's family and constantly warns Rahulya of grave consequences on taking law in his hands, but to no avail. Rajveer now decides to leave the fate of the gangsters to themselves knowing that only one would be left behind upon killing each others's gang. He further intensifies the inter-gang rivalry by killing members of both the gang members without each others's knowledge. Rahulya, though a rich man feels lonely. As he goes to the market place, Dattaram despises him. Manda's father Satya too shouts at Rahulya that he would never marry off his daughter to him. Enraged, Rahulya hits him. Manda then hits Rahulya and breaks up with him. Rahulya becomes even more dreaded gangster: he starts extortions, captures many peoples's lands and turns his eyes on Dattaram's land and gets his vengeance by killing Shinde. An elated Rahulya shares the news to Dattaram, but isn't happy as usual because of Rahulya's coercive methods. During one of the land settlements, he comes across a happy family where the father is proud of his sons's achievements. After hearing this, Rahulya now has a change of heart.

As he returns to the marketplace, he meets Dattaram and asks him to come with him and that he would join politics. Dattaram lashes out that he had many chances to mend his ways but he didn't. As Rahulya is about to leave, The local MLA is informed of Rahulya joining politics and tips Pitya and Daya to murder Rahulya. On the day of Ganesh Chaturthi, Rajveer encounter-kills the MLA and the duo end up chasing Rahulya on Pune roads to murder him. Rahulya quickly phones Sidhu about the happenings and asks him to inform everyone. Sidhu and Rahulya reach the market. Meanwhile, Dattaram also calls and informs Rajveer of the happenings and arrives at the market place. Rahulya now comes out of hiding and both of them confront the Daya-Pitya duo. As the duo are captured, Rahulya surrenders himself to the police. Sidhu takes out his gun and shoots Rahulya, killing him. He reveals that he is masterji's grandson and promised to avenge his death to his dying mother by murdering Rahulya in the marketplace. Rajveer then encounters and kills Pitya-Daya. As Rahulya's dead body is about to be cremated, everybody weeps and Dattaram frantically laughs as he is reminded of Rahulya's words to smile at least once. As Rajveer leaves, he thinks that Rahulya needed only 6 feet of land despite owning 300 acres.

== Cast ==
- Salman Khan as Inspector Rajveer Singh Sandhu
- Aayush Sharma as Rahul 'Rahuliya' Patil
- Mahima Makwana as Manda Vichare, Rahul's love interest
- Mahesh Manjrekar as Satyavan 'Satya' Vichare
- Jisshu Sengupta as Pitya Bagare
- Nikitin Dheer as Daya Bagare
- Sachin Khedekar as Dattaram Patil, Rahul's father
- Chhaya Kadam as Dhurpi Patil, Rahul's mother
- Rohit Haldikar as Ganya Gopal, Rahul's childhood friend
- Siddhi Dalvi as Seema Patil, Rahul's sister
- Prem Dharmadhikari as Siddharth 'Sidhu'
- Upendra Limaye as Nanya Bhau
- Sayaji Shinde as Head constable Uday Nanavare
- Waluscha De Sousa as Chingari
- Lankesh Bhardwaj as Broker at Vegetable Market
- Uday Tikekar as Ramshiv Shinde aka Shinde Seth
- Sharad Ponkshe as MLA Ambir
- Bharat Ganeshpure as Lawyer Soman
- Rohit Phalke as Arun Nanavare
- Varun Dhawan in a special appearance in the song "Vighnaharta"

== Production ==
The film's principal photography commenced with Aayush Sharma on 15 November 2020, and Salman Khan joined the sets in December 2020 and the second schedule in January 2021. Filming was wrapped up in July 2021, but later Khan's some more scenes were added-on to the movie and Khan shot that scenes in the first week of October 2021.

== Soundtrack ==
Antim: The Final Truth

Soundtrack album by Ravi Basrur and Hitesh Modak
- Released: 24 November 2021
- Recorded: 2021
- Genre: Feature film soundtrack
- Length: 23:20
- Language: Hindi
- Label: Zee Music Company

Official audio
- Antim: The Final Truth - Full Album on YouTube

The music of film was composed by Ravi Basrur and Hitesh Modak while the lyrics were written by Vaibhav Joshi, Nitin Raikwar, and Shabbir Ahmed.

Track listing
No.	Title	Lyrics	Music	Singer(s)	Length
1.	"Koi Toh Aayega"	Ravi Basrur, Shabbir Ahmed	Ravi Basrur	Santhosh Venky, Ravi Basrur, Mohan Krishna, Sachin Basrur, Puneeth Rudranag, Vyasaraj Sosale, Chethan Handattu, Krishna Basrur, Nagaprakash Kota, Vijay Basrur, Umesh Karkada, Krishnamurthy Basrur, Nanndhu J K.G.F, Ramakrishna Basrur	3:28
2.	"Bhai Ka Birthday"	Nitin Raikwar	Hitesh Modak	Sajid Khan	4:20
3.	"Hone Laga"	Shabbir Ahmed	Ravi Basrur	Jubin Nautiyal	4:43
4.	"Vighnaharta"	Vaibhav Joshi	Hitesh Modak	Ajay Gogavale	6:04
5.	"Chingari"	Vaibhav Joshi	Hitesh Modak	Sunidhi Chauhan	4:45
Total length:					23:20

== Reception ==
=== Critical reception ===
On the review aggregator website Rotten Tomatoes, 21% of 14 critics' reviews are positive, with an average rating of 3.9/10.

Antim received mixed to positive reviews from critics. Taran Adarsh from Bollywood Hungama gave the film a rating of 3.5 out of 5 stars and described the film as "Power-packed". Ronak Kotecha of The Times of India gave the film 3 out of 5 rating by saying "With intense action and drama (a tad too much), ‘Antim: The Final Truth’ checks some of the boxes for mass entertainment. It also highlights the issue of land grabbing by mafia dons, who successfully manage to bend the law, as they are often hand-in-glove with the politicians. So, if you fancy over-the-top old-school Bollywood films that have an excess of just about everything then ‘Antim: The Final Truth’ may just be your kinda film." Gulf News gave the film 2.5 out of 5 rating and saying that "Director Mahesh Manjrekar as a drunk former small-time criminal is passable, but Khedekar’s (Sharma’s principled father) grief seems more genuine. Actress Mahima Makwana is effective in her part of a fierce woman some of the twists will remind you of an ‘80s Bollywood melodrama. All emotions and violence in this film are exaggerated and heightened, but this is not an unbearable movie. If you are willing to tolerate this film’s obvious need to be woke and loud, you may even enjoy the good vs evil drama." Komal Nahta of Film Information wrote, "Antim has entertainment value but it lacks novelty." Khaleej Times gave the film 3 out of 5 rating and wrote "Antim is a well-made film with a generous dose of superbly shot action sequences offset by some zany dialogues that will make you smile in the midst of all the doom and gloom. Its strength lies in the fact it is a typical Salman Khan film that ends up being more than just another Salman Khan movie as well." India Today gave the film 3 out of 5 rating and saying that "Antim is a small step in the right direction for Salman Khan and a big step for Aayush Sharma whose path of self-discovery as an actor seems to have begun with this film. Overall Antim has enough ammunition to deliver what it set out to promise - an action blockbuster with a massive emotional connect."

=== Box office ===
Antim: The Final Truth earned ₹5.03 crore at the box office on its opening day, and had a total domestic opening weekend collection of ₹18.61 crore. It went on to earn a worldwide gross of ₹59.11 crore.
