= Manjha =

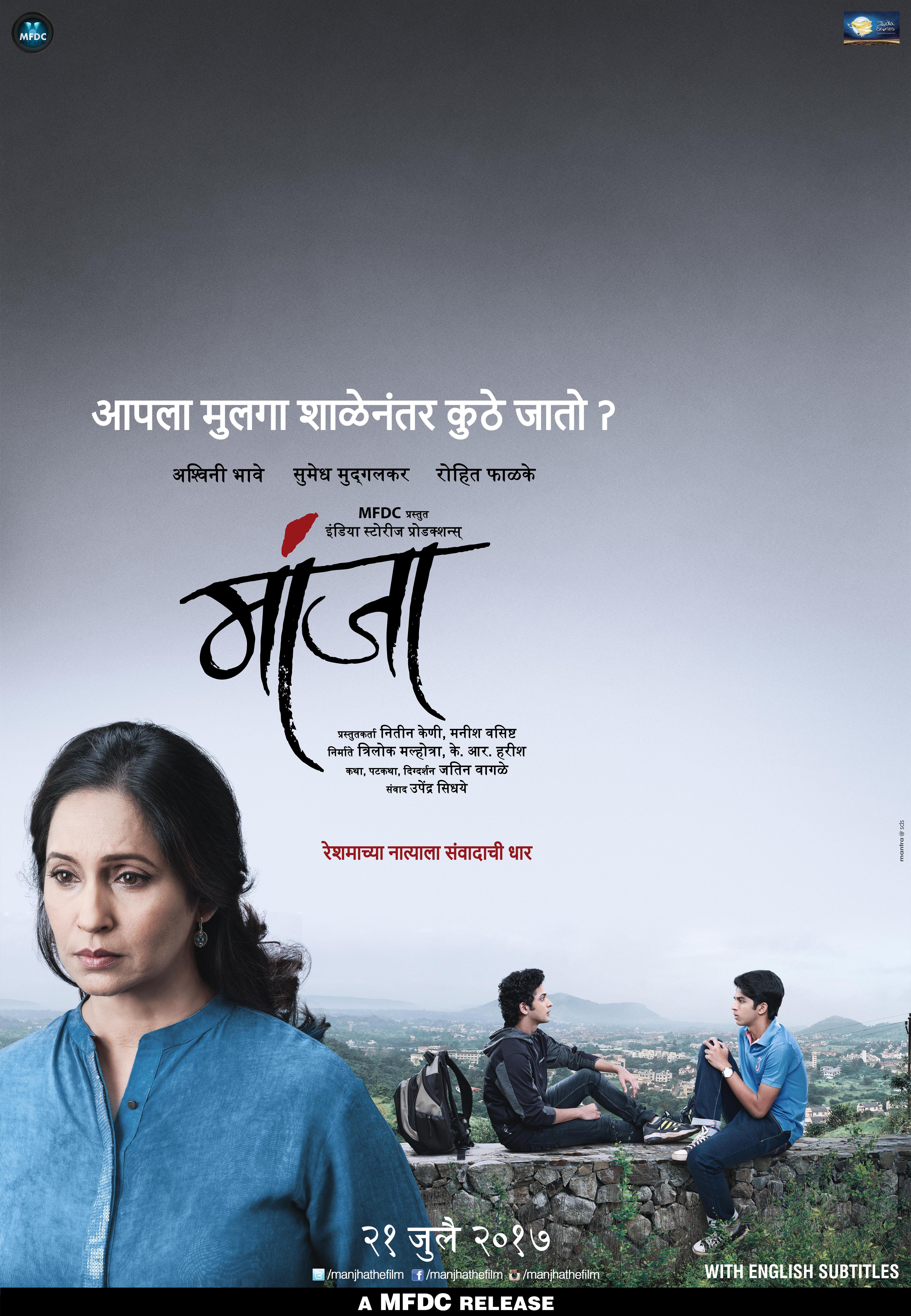
- Official poster of Manjha
- Directed by: Jatin Wagle
- Written by: Jatin Wagle
- Produced by: Trilok Malhotra; K R Harish
- Starring: Ashwini Bhave; Sumedh Mudgalkar; Rohit Phalke; Shivani Tanksale
- Cinematography: Fasahat Khan
- Edited by: Charu Shree Roy
- Music by: Shail-Pritesh
- Production company: India Stories Productions
- Release date: 21 July 2017
- Running time: 119 minutes
- Country: India
- Language: Marathi

Manjha (IPA: /maːɲdʒʱaː/) is a 2017 Indian Marathi-language psychological drama film, directed by Jatin Wagle and produced by Trilok Malhotra and KR Harish under the banner of India Stories Productions. It was released on 21 July 2017.

== Plot ==
The story is set in Lonavala, Maharashtra. Jaideep, a teenage boy and Samidha, his mother arrive in town. Samidha has got a job in a hotel run by her best friend Veena and her husband. They help Jaideep get admission in a school cum hostel. Samidha is divorced and has got away from an abusive relationship.

In the school, Jaideep befriends a boy called Vikram a.k.a. Vicky, who is the school's Prefect and stays at the hostel. Vicky protects Jaideep from being bullied, but he also dominates him. He talks to Jaideep about raping Veena's daughter; when Jaideep tells him not to treat women in that way, Vicky threatens to throw him from a bridge on a highway. Vicky also claims to have killed many people by throwing stones on speeding cars from the bridge. When Jaideep refuses to bring Veena's daughter to a secluded spot for Vicky to have sex with her, Vicky threatens to commit suicide from the same bridge and frame Jaideep.

Samidha notices the change in Jaideep's behaviour and convinces him to tell her what is going on. She reports Vicky's actions to the Principal, who brushes her off, saying that Vicky's character is impeccable. Samidha consults a psychiatrist, who tells her that Jaideep is probably telling the truth.

Samidha decides to leave Lonavala, but changes her mind, telling Jaideep that she does not want to run away from yet another abusive person. Jaideep returns to school as if nothing has happened, and tells Vicky that he will bring the girl to the secluded spot. The girl's father is watching the area to catch Vicky in the act of assaulting his daughter. Vicky doesn't turn up, since he has gone to Samidha's house in order to rape her. She has predicted this, and Veena and the school's principal are in hiding to witness Vicky's behaviour. He is arrested and taken away by the police, and Jaideep and his mother feel that the worst is behind them.

== Cast ==
Name	Role
Ashwini Bhave	Samidha
Sumedh Mudgalkar	Vikram a.k.a. Vicky
Rohit Phalke	Jaideep
Apoorva Arora	Maya
Shivani Tanksale	Veena
Mohan Kapur	Veena's Husband
Denzil Smith	Principal
