= F.U.: Friendship Unlimited =

FU: Friendship Unlimited
- Theatrical release poster
- Directed by: Mahesh Manjrekar
- Written by: Abhijeet deshpande
- Screenplay by: Abhijeet deshpande & Mahesh Manjrekar
- Produced by: Cut2Cut Movies; Bhushan Kumar Krishan Kumar
- Starring: Akash Thosar; Vaidehi Parashurami; Sanskruti Balgude; Satya Manjrekar
- Cinematography: Karan B. Rawat
- Edited by: Satish Patil
- Music by: Vishal Mishra; Sameer Saptiskar
- Production companies: T-Series Films; Cut2Cut Movies; Mahesh Manjrekar Movies
- Distributed by: AA Films
- Release date: 2 June 2017
- Country: India
- Language: Marathi
- Box office: 9 crore

F.U: Friendship Unlimited is a 2017 Marathi-language romantic comedy-drama film starring Akash Thosar, Vaidehi Parashurami, Sanskruti Balgude, Satya Manjrekar, and Mayuresh Pem. It was produced and directed by Mahesh Manjrekar under the banners of T-Series Films, Cut2Cut Movies, and Mahesh Manjrekar Movies. Despite received mixed reviews from critics, the film grossed 9 crore on box office and was commercially successful.

== Plot ==
The story follows five close friends whose carefree and rebellious actions lead them into unexpected challenges, ultimately teaching them valuable lessons about life and friendship.

== Cast ==
- Akash Thosar
- Vaidehi Parashurami
- Satya Manjrekar
- Shubham Kirodian
- Mayuresh Pem
- Nitesh Kalbande
- Sanskruti Balgude
- Isha Koppikar
- Boman Irani
- Mahesh Manjrekar
- Medha Manjrekar
- Chetan Hansraj
- Kashmera Shah
- Anand Ingle
- Bharti Achrekar
- Madhav Deochake
- Sharad Ponkshe
- Sachin Khedekar
- Ashwini Ekbote
- Radhika Vidyasagar
- Pawandeep Rajan

== Soundtrack ==
All the songs from the Marathi album were released under the labels T-Series and Saregama. The music was composed by Vishal Mishra and Sameer Saptiskar.

| No. | Title | Singer(s) | Length |
|---|---|---|---|
| 1. | "Pehli Dafa" | Vishal Mishra |
| 2. | "Ka Watt Te Saare Nave" | Vishal Mishra |
| 3. | "Uff Tuza Ha Jalwa" | Avadhoot Gupte, Prajakta Shukre |
| 4. | "Teri Baaton Ke" | Vishal Mishra |
| 5. | "Teri Baaton Ke" | Iulia Vantur |
| 6. | "Don't Control Us" | Siddharth Basrur |
| 7. | "Darmiyaan" | Vishal Mishra, Shreya Ghoshal |
| 8. | "F.U" | Vishal Mishra, Wrisha Dutta |
| 9. | "Girlfriend" | Visha Mishra |
| 10. | "Tu Auron Ki (Party Version)" | Benny Dayal |
| 11. | "Tujhya Vina O Yara" | Sonu Nigam |
| 12. | "Tere Bin O Yaara" | Sonu Nigam |
| 13. | "Tu Auron Ki (Hindi)" | Mahesh Manjrekar |
| 14. | "Darmiyaan" | Akash Okja, Prakriti Kakar |
| 15. | "Tu Auron Ke (Marathi)" | Mahesh Manjrekar |
| 16. | "Uff Tuza Ha Jalwa" | Sukhwinder Singh, Neeti Mohan |
| 17. | "Diljale" | Vishal Mishra |
| 18. | "Uff Tuza Ha Jalwa" | Aishwarya Nigam, Neeti Mohan |
| 19. | "Diljale (Marathi)" | Vishal Mishra |

== Reception ==
Professional ratings
Review scores
| Source | Rating |
|---|---|
| The Times of India | 3.0/5 stars |
| Maharashtra Times | 3.0/5 stars |
| Mumbai Mirror | 1.5/5 stars |
