= De Dhakka 2 =

2022 Indian comedy-drama film

- Theatrical release poster
- Directed by: Mahesh Manjrekar; Sudesh Manjrekar
- Written by: Pratap Phad
- Produced by: Swati Khopkar; Yatin Jadhav
- Starring: Makarand Anaspure; Medha Manjrekar; Shivaji Satam; Saksham Kulkarni; Gauri Ingawale; Siddhartha Jadhav
- Cinematography: Karan B. Rawat
- Edited by: Satish Padwal
- Music by: Hitesh Modak
- Production companies: Ameya Vinod Khopkar Entertainment; Skylink Entertainment
- Distributed by: Filmastra Studios
- Release date: 5 August 2022
- Country: India
- Language: Marathi

De Dhakka 2 (transl. Give a Push 2) is a 2022 Marathi-language comedy drama film directed by the duo Mahesh Manjrekar and Sudesh Manjrekar and produced by Ameya Vinod Khopkar Entertainment in association with Skylink Entertainment. It is a sequel to the 2008 film De Dhakka, featuring Makarand Anaspure, Medha Manjrekar, Shivaji Satam, Saksham Kulkarni, Siddhartha Jadhav and Gauri Ingawale in lead roles with Pravin Tarde, Sanjay Khapre, Mahesh Manjrekar in supporting roles. The film was theatrically released on 5 August 2022 clash with Saleel Kulkarni's Ekda Kaay Zala.

== Plot ==
After his component was utilised in automobiles all over the world to reduce fuel consumption, Makarand Jadhav, who is currently living the high life in Kolhapur, receives an invitation from London to an event where he will be recognised as an accomplished Indian businessman. Makarand and Sumati are invited to the event, but Makarand believes that everyone who has supported him has contributed equally to his achievement should go with him. When they arrive, a hotel employee insults him and his family for being Indians, which upsets him because he can't bear to have his father be ridiculed. When Mallesh Vijaywada approaches them with an invitation for lunch with the grandson of Lord Mountbatten at his palace after Makarand owns the hotel there on his own and soon after gets interviewed by numerous channels, they discover something is off. He is compelled to admit on camera that he had taken the car component from Dhanaji and Sayli and given it to Makarand while they are being held captive in the palace. Neeraj Dedhia, an Indian scammer, and Vijaywada had organised the entire incident to pay off their debts. Makarand and his family make the decision to do whatever it takes to get Neeraj Dedhia. While Babbar Lahori, a hired killer, is sent by Neeraj Dedhia to murder the family.

== Cast ==
- Makarand Anaspure as Makarand Suryabhan Jadhav
- Medha Manjrekar as Sumati, Makarand's wife
- Shivaji Satam as Suryabhan Jadhav/Tatya, Makarand's father
- Saksham Kulkarni as Kisna Makarand Jadhav
- Gauri Ingawale as Sayali Makarand Jadhav
- Siddhartha Jadhav as Dhanaji Manmode
- Sanjay Khapre as Hemlya
- Vidyadhar Joshi as Neeraj Dedhia
- Anand Ingle as Bobby Deva
- Abhijeet Deshpande as Amar
- Mahesh Manjrekar as Babbar Lahori
- Pravin Tarde as Mallesh Vijaywada
- Bharati Achrekar as Queen Elizabeth (Fake)

== Release ==
=== Theatrical ===
De Dhakka 2 was theatrically released on 5 August 2022.

=== Home media ===
The digital streaming rights of the film was acquired by ZEE5, and it was premiered on 24 March 2023.

== Reception ==
Mihir Bhanage of The Times of India gave 3.0/5 rating, praised performances, comic timing of each actor and criticised predictable storyline. Kalpeshraj Kubal of Maharashtra Times also gave same rating praised music wrote: "While expanding the story of the second part of the story as the writer, Manjrekar has kept the journey of the story interesting." Chitrali Chogle Anawkar of Lokmat, awarded 3 stars out of 5 stars and wrote "The acting side of the movie is solid and the story seems to need a bit of innovation." Pune Mirror criticized cringeworthy humourless jokes, non-realistic extreme cultural hatred and love by foreigners, lack of a basic narrative and utterly irrational situations.

== Music ==
All music is composed by Hitesh Modak.

Track listing
No.	Title	Lyrics	Singer (s)	Length
1.	"Deh Petude"	Neha Shitole	Ria Bhattacharya	4:50
2.	"Gar Gar Bingri"	Mandar Cholkar	Vaishali Mhade	4:42
3.	"Nazar Katyar"	Mandar Cholkar	Ketaki Mategaonkar	4:41
4.	"Punha Dhakka"	Mandar Cholkar & Traditional	Avdhoot Gupte, Shamika Bhide	4:41
