= Juna Furniture =

- Theatrical release poster
- Marathi: जुनं फर्निचर
- Directed by: Mahesh Manjrekar
- Written by: Mahesh Manjrekar
- Produced by: Yatin Jadhav
- Starring: Mahesh Manjrekar; Medha Manjrekar; Anusha Dandekar; Bhushan Pradhan; Sachin Khedekar; Upendra Limaye
- Cinematography: Ajit Reddy
- Edited by: Rahul Bhatankar
- Music by: Hitesh Modak
- Production companies: Skylink Entertainment; Satya Saiee Films
- Distributed by: AA Films
- Release date: 26 April 2024
- Running time: 144 minutes
- Country: India
- Language: Marathi
- Box office: est.₹14 crore (US$1.5 million)

Juna Furniture (transl. Old Furniture) is a 2024 Indian Marathi-language drama film written and directed by Mahesh Manjrekar, who is featured in the leading role. Other cast included Medha Manjrekar, Bhushan Pradhan, Anusha Dandekar, Sameer Dharmadhikari, Sachin Khedekar, and Upendra Limaye in pivotal roles. It is produced by Yatin Jadhav under the banner of Skylink Entertainment.

The film was theatrically released on 26 April 2024 and grossed over ₹14 crore (US$1.5 million) at the box office, becoming the fourth highest grossing Marathi film of the year. The film received generally positive reviews from critics, praised for its portrayal of human emotions, resilience, and societal concerns, particularly regarding the neglect of senior citizens, and criticised for illogical elements and a slight drag in the plot post-interval.

== Plot ==
Once upon a time, there lived Govind Pathak, a senior citizen. His son, Abhay, a prominent IAS officer, tied the knot with Avni, a woman from a wealthy family. Abhay's career soared as he was appointed as the Principal Secretary to the Chief Minister. To secure his father's future, Abhay invested Govind's retirement savings and managed his financial transactions. However, Govind often found himself in need of money, having to repeatedly ask Abhay for it. One fateful day, when Govind urgently needed Abhay's help due to his mother's deteriorating health, Abhay was preoccupied with an anniversary celebration. Despite Govind's attempts to reach out, the message went unanswered until it was too late. Tired of his son's ignorance, Govind decides to file a case against his son demanding the sum of money he had spent on his son's future until now. The movie then shows how Govind fights the case gaining support for other senior citizens but also angering some other people.

== Cast ==
- Mahesh Manjrekar as Govind Shridhar Pathak
- Medha Manjrekar as Suhasini Pathak
- Bhushan Pradhan as Abhay Govind Pathak
- Anusha Dandekar as Avni Abhay Pathak
- Sameer Dharmadhikari as Sameer Joshi, Abhay's father-in-law
- Sachin Khedekar as Sessions Judge
- Shivaji Satam as Magistrate
- Sharad Ponkshe as Advocate
- Upendra Limaye as Prakash Dagdu Bhope alias Pakya bhai
- Girish Oak as Adovocate Bapat
- Ramdas Sawant as Ramdas Sawant
- Makarand Anaspure as Chief Minister
- Onkar Bhojane as Bandya
- Shrirang Deshmukh as Deshmukh
- Prem Dharmadhikari as Vinya
- Shridhar Limaye as Dr. Joshi
- Vijay Nikam as Adovocate Dinkar Pandit
- Alka Parab as Manda Gawde
- Dhananjay Mandrekar as Dr. Veerendra Sharma
- Rajesh Bhosale as Vada Pav stall owner

== Production ==
Mahesh Manjrekar conceived the idea nearly 12 years ago, drawing from a deeply personal space following the loss of his mother. Originally planned as a Hindi film, Manjrekar encountered delays in production due to casting. With no actor available on short notice, Manjrekar took on the central role himself, marking his first lead role in his own directorial venture.

== Soundtrack ==
Track listing
No.	Title	Lyrics	Music	Singer (s)	Length
1.	"Kay Chukle Saang Naa"	Vaibhav Joshi	DH Hrmony, SRM Alien	Mahesh Manjrekar	3:22
Total length:					3:22

== Marketing ==
The teaser of the film was launched at Aaji Ajoba Udhyan at Shivaji Park, Mumbai, where Salim Khan was attended the event.

== Release ==
The film was theatrically released on 26 April 2024.

== Reception ==
=== Critical reception ===
Kalpeshraj Kubal of The Times of India rated 3.5 stars out of 5 stars and wrote "Juna Furniture is a story of human emotions, resilience and a societal concern that is prominently seen today." Nandini Ramnath of Scroll.in called it "A simplistic crusade against the neglect of senior citizens." Priyanka Kulkarni of Sakal awarded 3.5 rating out of 5, the reviewer is praised the film's music and cinematography, acknowledging its excellence. However, she also found that aspects of the film are illogical. Sanjay Ghaware of Lokmat rated 3.5 stars out of 5 stars, noted the mix of poignant and humorous dialogues and praised the gripping first half, though acknowledging a slight drag in the plot post-interval, which eventually recovers.

=== Box office ===
The film collected ₹40 lakh (US$42,000) on its opening day and grossed over ₹1.2 crore (US$120,000) in three days. The film has earned ₹4 crore (US$420,000) in the first week. The film stands at ₹5.75 crore (US$600,000) in five days. On the next day film earned ₹6 crore (US$620,000) mark. The film grossed ₹14 crore (US$1.5 million) in its final theatrical run.

=== Accolades ===
Year	Award	Category	Nominee (s)	Result	Ref.
2024	Aaryans Sanman	Promising Actor / Actress	Mahesh Manjrekar	Nominated	
2024	City Cine Awards	Best Film	Juna Furniture	Nominated	
2024	City Cine Awards	Best Actor	Mahesh Manjrekar	Nominated	
2024	City Cine Awards	Best Screenplay	Mahesh Manjrekar	Won	
2024	City Cine Awards	Best Lyricist	Vaibhav Joshi (song "Kay Chukle Saang Naa")	Nominated	
2024	City Cine Awards	King of Entertainment	Upendra Limaye	Nominated	
2025	NDTV Marathi Entertainment Awards	Best Film	Juna Furniture	Nominated	
2025	NDTV Marathi Entertainment Awards	Best Director	Mahesh Manjrekar	Nominated	
2025	NDTV Marathi Entertainment Awards	Best Actor	Mahesh Manjrekar	Nominated	
2025	NDTV Marathi Entertainment Awards	Best Actress	Medha Manjrekar	Nominated	
2025	NDTV Marathi Entertainment Awards	Best Lyricist	Vaibhav Joshi (song "Kay Chukle Saang Naa")	Won	
2025	Zee Chitra Gaurav Puraskar	Best Film	Juna Furniture	Nominated	
2025	Zee Chitra Gaurav Puraskar	Best Actor	Mahesh Manjrekar	Won	
2025	Zee Chitra Gaurav Puraskar	Best Playback Singer – Male	Mahesh Manjrekar	Nominated	
2025	Zee Chitra Gaurav Puraskar	Best Story	Mahesh Manjrekar	Nominated	
2025	Zee Chitra Gaurav Puraskar	Best Screenplay	Mahesh Manjrekar	Nominated	
2025	Zee Chitra Gaurav Puraskar	Best Dialogue	Mahesh Manjrekar	Won	
2025	Zee Chitra Gaurav Puraskar	Best Supporting Actor	Upendra Limaye	Nominated	
2025	Zee Chitra Gaurav Puraskar	Best Supporting Actress	Medha Manjrekar	Nominated	
2025	Zee Chitra Gaurav Puraskar	Best Editing	Rahul Bhatankar	Nominated	
2025	Mata Sanman	Best Film	Juna Furniture	Nominated	
2025	Mata Sanman	Best Director	Mahesh Manjrekar	Nominated	
2025	Mata Sanman	Best Actor	Mahesh Manjrekar	Won	
2025	Mata Sanman	Best Screenplay	Mahesh Manjrekar	Nominated	
2025	Mata Sanman	Best Dialogue	Mahesh Manjrekar	Won	
2025	Mata Sanman	Best Editor	Rahul Bhatankar	Nominated	
