= Panghrun =

Indian Marathi-language film by Mahesh Manjrekar

- Theatrical release poster
- Directed by: Mahesh Manjrekar
- Screenplay by: Mahesh Manjrekar; Ganesh Matkari
- Story by: Balakrishna Bhagwant Borkar
- Produced by: Mahesh Patel; Umesh Kubal; Paresh Mavani; Umesh Nathani; Virendra Mavani
- Starring: Gauri Ingawale; Amol Bavadekar
- Cinematography: Karan B. Rawat
- Edited by: Satish Padval
- Music by: Hitesh Modak
- Production companies: Zee Studios; Mahesh Manjrekar Movies
- Release dates: 2018 (Mumbai Film Festival); 2020 (Bengaluru International Film Festival); 4 February 2022 (Theatrical)
- Running time: 131 minutes
- Country: India
- Language: Marathi

Panghrun (transl. Blanket) is an Indian Marathi-language period musical drama film directed by Mahesh Manjrekar and produced by Zee Studios, featuring Amol Bhavadekar and Gauri Ingawale in the leading roles.

== Plot ==
This story is set at the time of India's independence in 1947, during which time freedom. The society had to struggle long to accept widow remarriage or prevent underage girls from marrying in the first place. Lakshmi, a widowed woman who is skilled in classical music, is forced to marry a man twice her age who is a kirtankar. He has two children from his previous wife. Lakshmi falls in love with Guruji through the daily routine of life. But Guruji stays away to keep some illusions at bay.

== Cast ==
- Gauri Ingawale as Laxmi
- Amol Bavadekar as Guruji
- Rohit Phalke as Madhav
- Medha Manjrekar as Janaki
- Pravin Tarde as Khot
- Sulekha Talwalkar as Radhakka
- Deepti Lele as Kunda
- Vidhyadhar Joshi as Ramnath
- Prabhakar More as Lakhoba

== Production ==
After the huge success of Kaksparsh (2012) and Natsamrat (2016), Manjrekar started producing the film in 2017, inspired from B.B. Borkar's short-story.

Panghrun was shot in Konkan region and other locations of Maharashtra.

== Marketing and release ==
The teaser was released on 11 February 2022 and trailer on 24 January 2022.

The film was originally scheduled for release on 3 April 2020, but it ultimately premiered in theaters on 4 February 2022.

== Critical reception ==
Preeti Atulkar of The Times of India gave 4 stars out 5 and wrote "With sharp screenplay and strong storyline, the film holds your attention from start to finish. Thus, it is safe to say that Mahesh Manjrekar has once again displayed his cinematic excellence with this one." Chitrali Choghale of Lokmat rated 3.5 stars out of 5 and wrote "A very skilled director speaks volumes for the joy and experience of watching a movie, this movie is very much in his many little things."

== Soundtrack ==
Panghrun

Soundtrack album by Hitesh Modak
- Released: 19 February 2020
- Recorded: 2017–2018
- Genre: Feature film soundtrack
- Length: 41:20
- Language: Marathi
- Label: Zee Music Company

Official audio
- Panghrun - Full Album on YouTube

Track listing
| No. | Title | Singer (s) | Length |
|---|---|---|---|
| 1. | "Hee Anokhi Gath" | Vijay Prakash | 3:28 |
| 2. | "Dhaav Ghali Aai" | Anand Bhate, Prathamesh Laghate | 3:27 |
| 3. | "Satrangi Jhala Re" | Pawandeep Rajan, Aanandi Joshi | 3:16 |
| 4. | "Ilusa Ha Deh (Male version)" | Anand Bhate, Prathamesh Laghate | 3:21 |
| 5. | "Sahvena Anurag" | Ketaki Mategaonkar, Satyam Kumar | 3:24 |
| 6. | "Deve Thevile Taise Rahave" | Anand Bhate | 4:07 |
| 7. | "Jeev Hoto Kasavis" | Anand Bhate | 3:54 |
| 8. | "Ilusa Ha Deh (Female version)" | Ketaki Mategaonkar, Vijay Prakash | 1:04 |
| Total length: | | | 26:01 |

== Awards ==
- 2020:Won:The Best Indian Cinema Award – Bangalore International Film Festival
- 2024:Won:Maharashtra State Film Awards
  - Best Cinematography – Karan B. Rawat
  - Best Story – Balakrishna Bhagwant Borkar
  - Best Supporting Actor - Rohit Phalke
- 2024:Nominated:Maharashtra State Film Awards
  - Best Background Music – Hitesh Modak
  - Best Lyrics – Vaibhav Joshi for "Hee Anokhi Gaath"
