= Karan B. Rawat =

Indian cinematographer

- Born: Karan Bahadur Rawat
- Occupation: Cinematographer
- Notable work: Panghrun (2022)

Karan B. Rawat is an Indian cinematographer who predominantly works in Marathi and Hindi films. In 2024, he won the Maharashtra State Film Award of Best cinematography for Panghrun film.

== Filmography ==
=== Film ===
Key
†	Denotes film or TV productions that have not yet been released

Year	Title	Language	Notes
2013	Ronde Sare Vyah Picho	Hindi	Debut
2014	Koyelaanchal	Hindi	
2014	Titoo MBA	Hindi	
2017	FU: Friendship Unlimited	Marathi	Debut in Marathi cinema
2017	2016 The End	Hindi	
2018	Shikari	Marathi	
2019	Me Shivaji Park	Marathi	
2019	Bhai: Vyakti Ki Valli	Marathi	
2019	Bhai: Vyakti Ki Valli 2	Marathi	
2021	Antim: The Final Truth	Hindi	
2021	1962: The War in the Hills	Hindi	
2022	Nay Varanbhat Loncha Kon Nay Koncha	Marathi	
2022	Panghrun	Marathi	
2022	De Dhakka 2	Marathi	
2024	Hi Anokhi Gaath	Marathi	
2025	Ace	Tamil	Debut in Tamil cinema
2026	Gandhi Talks	Sound	
TBA	Vedat Marathe Veer Daudle Saat †	Marathi	

=== Music videos ===
- "Bollywood Wala Dance" (2021)
- "Vande Matram" (2022)
- "Main Chala" (2022)
- "Dance With Me" (2022)
- "Kya Farak Padta Hai" (2022)

== Awards ==
- 2024:Won:Maharashtra State Film Award Best Cinematography – Panghrun
