= Kaksparsh =

- Poster; Seen are Priya Bapat in white and Medha Manjrekar in red saree with Sachin Khedekar seated.
- Directed by: Mahesh Manjrekar
- Screenplay by: Girish Joshi
- Based on: Kaksparsh by Usha Datar
- Produced by: Medha Manjrekar
- Starring: Sachin Khedekar; Priya Bapat; Medha Manjrekar; Savita Malpekar; Ketaki Mategaonkar; Vaibhav Mangle; Abhijit Kelkar
- Cinematography: Ajith V. Reddy
- Edited by: Rahul Bhatankar
- Music by: Rahul Ranade; Ajit-Sameer
- Distributed by: Zee Talkies
- Release date: 4 May 2012
- Running time: 147 minutes
- Country: India
- Language: Marathi
- Budget: ₹1.4 crore (US$150,000)
- Box office: ₹14 crore (US$1.5 million)

Kaksparsh (transl. The touch of a crow) is a 2012 Indian Marathi period drama film directed by Mahesh Manjrekar and produced by Aniruddha Deshpande and Medha Manjrekar. The film stars Sachin Khedekar, Priya Bapat, Medha Manjrekar, Savita Malpekar and Ketaki Mategaonkar. Based on a short story by Usha Datar by the same name, the film depicts the tumultuous events in a Chitpavan Brahmin family, set around 1930–1950 in Konkan. The film was a commercial success and got critical acclaim for its direction, screenplay by Girish Joshi and also for the performances by its actors, especially Khedekar for his portrayal of Hari Damle as a head of the family.

In 1989, the short story was adapted into a Marathi play Janmagaath with actor-director Vinay Apte playing the lead. Apte had desires to make a film based on it. However, his attempts were not successful. Sachin Khedekar, who went to play the lead in the cinematic adaptation of the story, had seen the play and came across the story again in 2007. Khedekar requested Girish Joshi to complete the adapted screenplay and together approached Manjrekar in 2009 to make a film on the story. Kaksparsh's shooting was completed in 26 days – from 5 to 30 December 2011 and was released on 4 May 2012, on the occasion of centenary of Indian cinema.

The film won several awards on release including Best Film award at Maharashtra State Film Awards, MICTA, and 11th Pune International Film Festival. It is also the first Marathi film to have a home media release in Blu-ray. With the success of Kaksparsh, a Hindi and Tamil remake of Kaksparsh is also being directed by Mahesh Manjrekar with Arvind Swamy and Tisca Chopra as the leads.

== Plot ==
Hari Damle (Sachin Khedekar), head of a Chitpavan Bramhin family, lives in the village Torgaon in Konkan with his wife Tara (Medha Manjrekar), their three children, his younger brother Mahadev (Abhijit Kelkar), and his widowed aunt, Namu Aatya (Savita Malpekar). Hari arranges the marriage of Mahadev with a pre-pubescent girl, Durga (Ketaki Mategaonkar), renamed as Uma after marriage. However, Mahadev dies before the consummation of the marriage. Hari performs death rituals (Śrāddha) for Mahadev but crows (symbolic of the spirit of the deceased in Hinduism) refuse to touch the offerings. Hari mumbles something while offering food after which crow touches the offerings.

The Brahmin community in the village now expects widow Uma to have her head shaved (a ritual). Hari opposes and does not allow any rituals to be performed for her as a widow. Hari stands behind Uma in all her difficulties which raise doubts about his intentions, including that by his wife, Tara. Years later, when Tara is diagnosed of a terminal disease, the now grown-up Uma (now played by Priya Bapat) takes charge of the household. Before Tara dies, she realizes her mistakes and requests Hari to marry Uma which he readily refuses.

In the meantime, Hari gets his son Sankarshan (Saksham Kulkarni) married. Once Hari finds Uma sitting outside the room of the newly married couple, listening to their playful banter. Disgusted by Uma's behaviour, Hari starts avoiding her. Upset by this behaviour, Uma tries to talk her heart out to Hari's friend Balwant (Sanjay Khapre) and requests him to find out the reason. Coincidentally, Hari overhears this and severs his relations with Balwant. Unaware of the reason for Hari's changed behaviour, Uma starts staying aloof, while her health starts degrading. Worried Sankarshan requests his sister Shanti (Manava Naik) to talk to Uma. Frustrated and unknowing of what loss she had throughout her life, Uma opens her heart but situation raises more questions about her relation with Hari.

Uma decides to go on a fast and relents to none of the family member's request to quit. Hari, left with no other option, explains his behavior. Hari reveals to Uma that when he was performing death rituals for Mahadev and offerings were not accepted by crow for a long time, he took a vow that he would not let any other man touch Uma. Thus, he did not allow practiced rituals of shaving her head to be performed and also declined Tara's request of their marriage. When he learned through Tara that Uma has started loving him, he stopped talking to her, in spite of his love towards Uma.

He eventually accepts that he loves Uma and would marry her, breaking his vow. Knowing the truth, Uma forgives Hari and agrees to the proposal. Hari fetches Mangala sutra but finds out that Uma is dead. He realises that Uma has sacrificed her life for his love where she did not want Hari to break his vow.

== Cast ==
- Sachin Khedekar as Hari Dada Damle
- Priya Bapat as Uma Damle, widow of Mahadev Damle
  - Ketaki Mategaonkar as Young Uma Damle/Durga
- Abhijit Kelkar as Mahadev Damle, Hari's younger brother, Uma's deceased husband.
- Savita Malpekar as Namu Aatya, Hari's widow aunt
- Sanjay Khapre as Balwant Phadke
- Vaibhav Mangle as Upadhyay
- Medha Manjrekar as Tara Damle, Hari's wife
- Saksham Kulkarni as Sankarshan Damle, Hari-Tara's son
- Manava Naik as Shanti, Hari-Tara's daughter
- Saiee Manjrekar as Kushi, Hari-Tara's daughter
- Kishor Raorane as Janu

== Production ==
=== Development ===
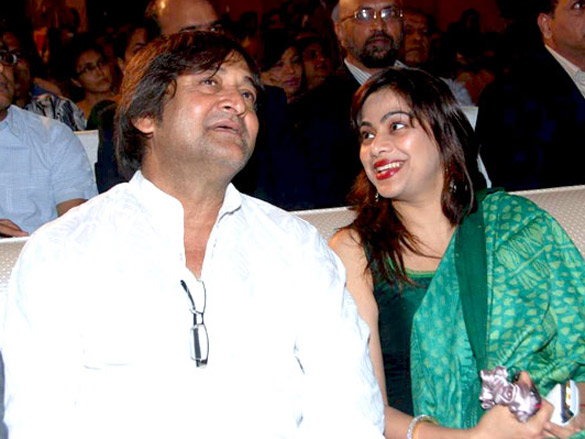
Mahesh Manjrekar with his wife Medha

Based on a short story Kaksparsh written by Usha Datar, a Marathi play Janmagaath premiered on 16 December 1989. Actor-director Vinay Apte had done the role of Hari Damle in the play and Sukanya Kulkarni as Uma. Apte had tried making a film based on the story but was not successful. (Note: Tillu, Rohan (20 May 2012). "ही तो प्रेक्षकांची कृपा!" [With the grace of viewers!]. Loksatta (in Marathi). The Indian Express.) Sachin Khedekar had seen the play and came across the story again in 2007. He showed the story to Girish Joshi (screenplay writer of the film) who then developed a complete adapted screenplay from the story which had a length of 4–5 pages. Later, Khedekar and Joshi approached Mahesh Manjrekar in 2009 to make a film on the story. However, Majrekar was busy with his other projects and could not plan the film. Manjrekar said that when he heard the story for the first time, he considered it to be better than other Indian love stories like Bajirao-Mastani or Salim-Anarkali. (Note: "सोनेरी अनुभूती देणारा 'काकस्पर्श'" ['Kaksparsh' is a golden experience]. Loksatta (in Marathi). The Indian Express.) Manjrekar had to wait as he did not have the copyrights for the story. He said that it "took more than three years to make this film".

=== Casting ===
After Manjrekar finished his projects, he decided to start Kaksparsh and signed Khedekar to portray the lead role of Hari Damle. The director said that there was no compulsion for him to cast Khedekar. He did it "because he was the best to pull it off." Earlier Manjrekar had signed another actress to play the role of Tara Damle, however the actress declined to join the schedule at the last moment, thus Manjrekar was forced to look out for the alternative. His wife, Medha Manjrekar, had done a small role in his debut film Aai (1995) and also made a comeback in another film De Dhakka (2008) written by him. As Medha was working as a producer for Kaksparsh, Mahesh Manjrekar approached her to play the role.

Manjrekar had worked with Priya Bapat in Me Shivajiraje Bhosale Boltoy (2009) and had mentioned about Kaksparsh to her. He desired Bapat to play the lead role of Uma, however the film couldn't start as planned. When Manjrekar planned for the film, he called Bapat again who had married Umesh Kamat in the meantime. Manjrekar had seen 2011 National Award-winning film Shala and was impressed with a teen-aged character played by Ketaki Mategaonkar and decided to cast her as a young Uma. Savita Malpekar was cast to play the role of Khedekar's widowed aunt. Malpekar had to shave her head to prepare for the role. Manjrekar insisted that the film cast including Savita Malpekar should shave the head for their roles and avoid wearing a prosthetic bald patch.

=== Filming ===
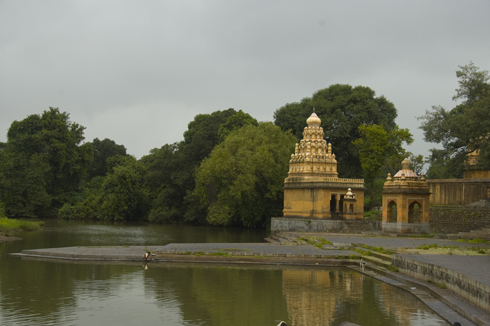
Krishna Ghat, Wai, Maharashtra where all the temple scenes of the films have been shot.

Kaksparsh was shot in the real locations than sets and was mainly shot in Paalshet, a village near Guhagar in Konkan. As the film's story-line was set around 1930–1950, Manjrekar was concerned about the authentic production design for the film. He appointed two production designers, Prashant Rane and Abhishek Vijaykar, who had challenges of depicting pre and post Indian independence era. Rane had worked with Manjrekar earlier for De Dhakka (2008). Kaksparsh's shooting was completed in 26 days; starting from 5 December 2011 till 30 December 2011. The initial shooting scheduled started at Ranade Wada in Pune. The film also had a few scenes in and surrounding the temple but as most of the temples in Konkan region have been restored from their damages over the period of time, Manjrekar feared that the plastering done to repair the damages would not give the desired authentic feel to the film. Thus, the next schedule was shifted to Krishna Ghat, Wai, Maharashtra. (Note: "वाई- भोर शूटिंगचे हाँट स्पॉट" [Wai-Bhor: Hot locations for shooting]. Loksatta (in Marathi). The Indian Express. 10 June 2012.)

As a director, Manjrekar believed that the mansion shown in the film "plays a major character" and was certain that finding the appropriate mansion would be a difficult job. The production designing team had searched for various location across Konkan but most of the mansions had electrical wiring across which was a major obstacle for the shooting as Konkan then did not have electricity. Finally, Manjrekar was introduced to a mansion owned by Avinash Nene near Paalshet which suited the period where third and final schedule of the film was carried out.

== Soundtrack ==
Kaksparsh

Soundtrack album by Rahul Ranade, Ajit-Sameer
- Released: 2012
- Genre: Film soundtrack
- Length: 30:02
- Language: Marathi
- Label: VP

"...after the film got released, many viewers started inquiring about the audio CDs for the songs used in the film. We had no such plans in the beginning but the growing demand compelled us to release the songs officially."

— Mahesh Manjrekar on releasing music later than the film.

The soundtrack for the film is composed by Rahul Ranade and music director duo Ajit Parab and Sameer Mhatre, popularly known as Ajit-Sameer. Poet-Actor Kishor Kadam ("Saumitra") and Mitali Joshi have written the lyrics for the songs. Being a period film set in 1930, soundtrack mainly consists of traditional songs in the form of Ovee, a type of metrical stanza in Marathi poetry by Mrs.Kumudini Pawar. Rahul Ranade used Vibhavari Joshi's voice for all of his compositions except "Janma Baicha". Joshi rendered all her songs without any musical accompaniment.

As most of the songs are in the form of Ovee, Ranade decided to use the traditional musical format. He took help of Mrs. Kumudini Pawar, sister of great folk literate Dr.Sarojini Babar a Marathi writer-politician who had studied the songs of the period depicted in the film. Mrs. Kumudini Pawar introduced Ranade to Babar's, collection of various traditional Ovee. For two situation songs, Ranade requested Kishor Kadam to write the lyrics.

The duo Ajit-Sameer composed two theme tracks and one song ("Kuthe Paath Phiravun") for the film's soundtrack. A noted Hindustani classical vocalist, Rajashree Pathak, rendered the song and was appreciated for "its vocal and soulfulness" and won Best Playback Singer (Female) at 2012 Zee Gaurav Puraskar. The soundtrack also made use of "Are Sansar Sansar", much-quoted couplet from one of the poems written by noted Marathi poet Bahinabai Chaudhari. The song is narrated and rendered by film's lead actors, Sachin Khedekar and Ketaki Mategaonkar respectively and is arranged by Sameer Mhatre. Before taking up acting, Mategaonkar had participated in singing reality show Sa Re Ga Ma Pa Marathi Li'l Champs.

The soundtrack was released after the film's release and was acclaimed for "bringing an authentic and subtle flavour to the period of the film." Kishore Kadam was also appreciated for writing lyrics which suitably noted the traditions followed by women during the period.

No.	Title	Lyrics	Music	Singer(s)	Length
1.	"Janma Baicha"	Kishor Kadam	Rahul Ranade	Chorus	4:42
2.	"Taak Ghusal Ghusal"	Kishor Kadam	Rahul Ranade	Vibhavari Joshi	1:42
3.	"Kuthe Paath Phiravun"	Mitali Joshi	Ajit-Sameer	Rajashree Pathak	3:34
4.	"Tulas Maalan"	Dr.Sarojini Babar	Rahul Ranade	Vibhavari Joshi	1:32
5.	"Ugawala Narayan"	Dr.Sarojini Babar	Rahul Ranade	Vibhavari Joshi	2:00
6.	"Saawalaa Pandurang"	Dr.Sarojini Babar	Rahul Ranade	Vibhavari Joshi	2:36
7.	"Kaksparsh (Love Found)"	Instrumental	Ajit-Sameer	Mrudula Sathe	5:02
8.	"Kaksparsh (Love Lost)"	Instrumental	Ajit-Sameer	Mrudula Sathe	6:18
9.	"Are Sansar Sansar"	Bahinabai Chaudhari	Sameer Mhatre	Sachin Khedekar, Ketaki Mategaonkar	2:36
Total length:					30:02

== Reception ==
Kaksparsh was released on 4 May 2012 which also marked a beginning of the 100th year of Indian cinema. The film received wide critical acclaim and was a commercial success. It got critical acclaim for the direction by Mahesh Manjrekar, its screenplay by Girish Joshi and for the performances by its actors, especially Sachin Khedekar for his portrayal of Hari Dada Damle as the head of the family. Ajit Reddy's cinematography and Ajit-Sameer's music were also praised. The film was said to have brought the "best out of" the director. Manjrekar said that he "expected to it be a hit, but not expected such a landslide hit". The film was noted to have a "strong script" and well presented "a sensitive issue." It was called as "the best love story in Marathi films." It was marketed as a love story, and a review in Maharashtra Times by Saumitra Pote noted that "the film has gone beyond a love story". The film also said to have shown "the mores of the period quite accurately". Aniruddha Bhatkhande of weekly Marathi magazine Lokprabha criticised the film in his review by saying that the actual film is a way different than the "attractive" promos. He further said that the film's costume designs are flawed and as most of the film is shot indoor, it gives a feeling to the viewers that they are watching a recorded theatre play.

Remake

With the success of Kaksparsh, it was reported in June 2012 that Manjrekar is planning a remake in Hindi starring Amitabh Bachchan. However, the director readily clarified that he is not planning for a remake and he did contact Bachchan for the film but not for the remake. Later in January 2014, Manjrekar announced that a Hindi and Tamil remake of Kaksparsh is being directed by himself starring Arvind Swamy, Tisca Chopra, Adinath Kothare and Ketaki Mategaonkar. Swamy will be portraying Khedekar's role whereas Chopra will be seen as Swamy's wife, originally played by Medha Manjrekar. Mategaonkar will reprise her role from the original and Vaidehi Parshurami will be playing the older Uma. Milind Soman is reported to play Swamy's friend and Adinath Kothare will play Mahadev's character which was originally played by Abhijit Kelkar. Murali Sharma will be seen portraying a negative character. The veteran Bollywood actress Tanuja will be portraying the role of widowed aunt, played by Savita Malpekar in the original. The music will be composed by Ilaiyaraaja with Mategoankar and Vibhavari Apte Joshi rendering their first Tamil song. Adinath Kothare's wife Urmila Kanitkar will be doing a guest appearance.

== Awards ==
The film won several awards on release.

- MFK Award for Favourite Film
- 2012 11th Pune International Film Festival
- Government of Maharashtra "Sant Tukaram" Best Marathi Feature Film Award
- Special Jury Award: Sachin Khedekar
- 2012 Maharashtra State Film Awards
- Best Film: Great Maratha Entertainment
- Best Actor: Sachin Khedekar
- Best Makeup Artist: Vikram Gaikwad, Henry Martis
- Best Director: Mahesh Manjrekar
- Best Actress: Priya Bapat
- Best Art Director: Prashant Rane, Abhishek Vijaykar
- 2012 Marathi International Cinema and Theatre Awards (MICTA)
- Best Film: Great Maratha Entertainment
- Best Actor: Sachin Khedekar
- Best Supporting Actor Female: Medha Manjrekar
- Best Art Director: Prashant Rane, Abhishekh Vijaykar
- Best Makeup Artist: Vikram Gaikwad, Henry Martis
- Best Director: Mahesh Manjrekar
- Best Actress: Ketaki Mategoankar
- Best Cinematographer: Ajit Reddy
- Best Costume Designer: Laxman Yellappa Gollar
- 2012 Prabhat Film Awards
- Best Actor (Male): Sachin Khedekar (Shared with Vikram Gokhale for Anumati)
- Best Background score: Ajit-Sameer
- 2012 Screen Awards Marathi
- Best Actress: Priya Bapat
- 2012 Zee Gaurav Puraskar
- Best Actor (Male): Sachin Khedekar
- Best Supporting Actor (Male): Sanjay Khapre
- Best Story: Usha Datar
- Best Sound: Manoj Mochemadkar
- Best Actor (Female): Priya Bapat
- Best Playback Singer (Female): Rajashree Pathak
- Best Dialogues: Girish Joshi

Other Awards

- All India Marathi Film Federation — Yashashree Puraskar
- Majha Awards – Medha Manjrekar
