= Medha Manjrekar =

Indian actress

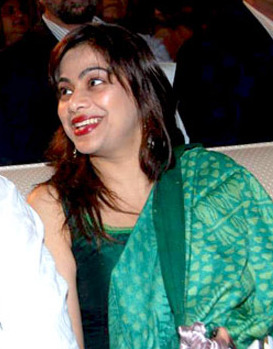
- Born: Medha Panshikar; 28 April 1968 (age 58); Bombay, Maharashtra
- Occupation: Actress
- Spouse: Mahesh Manjrekar (m. 1995)
- Children: Saiee Manjrekar, Gauri Ingawale

Medha Manjrekar (born 28 April 1968) is an Indian actress in Marathi cinema, known for Natsamrat (2016), Kaksparsh (2012) and De Dhakka (2008). She played lead role opposite Nana Patekar in 2016 Marathi film Natsamrat, the highest-grossing film in Marathi cinema at the time.

== Personal life ==
She is married to Mahesh Manjrekar in 1995, with whom she had a daughter named Saiee Manjrekar.

== Filmography ==
| Year | Film | Role | Language | Ref. |
|---|---|---|---|---|
| 1994 | Yadnya | Megha | Marathi | |
| 1995 | Aai | Prajakta Pradhan | Marathi | |
| 2008 | De Dhakka | Sumati Jadhav | Marathi | |
| 2009 | Me Shivajiraje Bhosale Boltoy | Usman's wife | Marathi | |
| 2011 | Fakta Ladh Mhana | Madhusudan's wife | Marathi | |
| 2012 | Kaksparsh | Tara Damle | Marathi | |
| 2016 | Natsamrat | Kaveri/Sarkar | Marathi | |
| 2016 | Bandh Nylon Che | Mangal Raghunath Jogalekar | Marathi | |
| 2016 | FU: Friendship Unlimited | | Marathi | |
| 2019 | Bhai: Vyakti Ki Valli 2 | Sadhana Amte | Marathi | |
| 2019 | Remember Amnesia | Dr. Rani | Hindi | |
| 2019 | Dabangg 3 | Janki | Hindi | |
| 2021 | The Power | Uma Kalidas Thakur | Hindi | |
| 2022 | Panghrun | Janaki | Marathi | |
| 2022 | De Dhakka 2 | Sumati Jadhav | Marathi | |
| 2022 | BhauBali | Ramabai Awalaskar | Marathi | |
| 2024 | Juna Furniture | Suhas Pathak | Marathi | |
| 2025 | Ek Radha Ek Meera | Manasvi's Mother | Marathi | |
