= Mahesh Manjrekar =

Indian actor and filmmaker (born 1958)

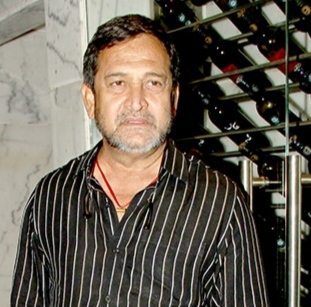
- Manjrekar in 2021
- Born: 16 August 1958 (age 68); Mumbai, Maharashtra, India
- Occupations: Actor; director; screenwriter; producer
- Years active: 1975–present
- Political party: Maharashtra Navnirman Sena
- Spouse: Deepa Mehta (m. 1987; div. 1995); Medha Manjrekar (m. 1995)
- Children: 3 (including Saiee Manjrekar)

Mahesh Vaman Manjrekar (Marathi pronunciation: [məɦeːʃ maːɲd͡zɾekəɾ]; born 16 August 1958) is an Indian actor, film director, screenwriter and producer who works primarily in Hindi, Marathi and Telugu films. He is best known for directing Vaastav: The Reality (1999), Astitva (2000) and Viruddh... Family Comes First (2005). He won a National Film Award, seven Maharashtra State Film Awards, four Filmfare Awards Marathi, a Filmfare Award, four Zee Chitra Gaurav Puraskar, four MFK Awards and two Star Screen Awards. In 2023, He was honoured with the V. Shantaram Award, Maharashtra's highest award in the field of cinema. He was also the host of the reality show, Bigg Boss Marathi from 2018 until 2023.

== Early life ==
Mahesh Manjrekar was born on 16 August 1958 in Mumbai, Maharashtra, India. He completed his schooling at Don Bosco High School in Mumbai and later attended the University of Mumbai for his higher education. He developed an interest in acting from an early age and began performing in theatre while in college. In 1984, he began his acting career with the Marathi stage play Aflatoon.

== Personal life ==
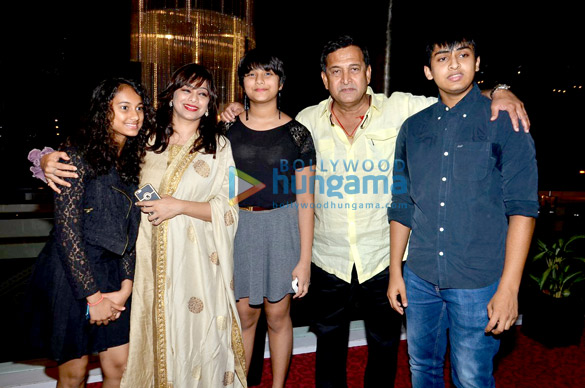
Manjrekar with family

Manjrekar was married to Deepa Mehta, a costume designer, with whom he has two children - Satya and Ashwami.; the couple later divorced. He subsequently married Medha Manjrekar, with whom he has a daughter, actress Saiee Manjrekar. He has a stepdaughter from Medha's first husband, Gauri Ingawale, who is also an actress.

== Career ==
Manjrekar began his acting career with the Marathi film Jeeva Sakha (1991), in which he portrayed Inspector Jamdade. He made his directorial debut with the Marathi film Aai (1995), for which he received the Filmfare Award for Best Director. In 1999, Manjrekar directed Vaastav: The Reality, which became a critical and commercial success and earned him a Filmfare Award. In 2000, he directed Astitva, for which he received National Film Award for Best Marathi Feature Film and the Maharashtra State Film Award for Best Director. He also directed Nidaan, Kurukshetra and Jis Desh Mein Ganga Rehta Hai during this period. In 2002, Manjrekar appeared in Kaante, for which he won IIFA Award for Best Comedian. The same year, he directed Hathyar, a sequel to Vaastav: The Reality. In 2003, he produced and acted in Praan Jaye Par Shaan Na Jaye. In 2004, he appeared in Plan as Sultan, Run as Ganpat and Musafir as Lukka. In 2005, he appeared in the English-language film It Was Raining That Night as Brij Bhushan and made his Kannada film debut in Encounter: Daya Nayak, playing Yousuf Khaleel. He also directed Viruddh... Family Comes First and Vaah! Life Ho Toh Aisi! that year. He wrote the screenplay for the Marathi film Matichya Chuli, for which he received the Maharashtra State Film Award for Best Screenplay. He also participated as a contestant on the dance reality show Jhalak Dikhhla Jaa.

In 2007, he appeared in Dus Kahaniyaan and made his Telugu film debut with Okkadunnadu, in which he played Sona Bhai. He also appeared in Padmashree Laloo Prasad Yadav as Advocate Prasad and Deha as Madhav. In 2008, he appeared in Meerabai Not Out as Manoj Achrekar and in the Academy Award-winning film Slumdog Millionaire as Don Javed. He also appeared in the Telugu film Homam, playing Daddy. In 2009, Manjrekar wrote and starred in the Marathi film Mi Shivajiraje Bhosale Boltoy!, portraying Chhatrapati Shivaji Maharaj. The film became the highest-grossing Marathi film at the time, earning approximately ₹25 crore. He also appeared in the Hindi films Wanted as Talpade and 99 as AGM. In 2010, he appeared in the Telugu film Adhurs as Don Baba, as Teen Patti as Dagdu Sheth, and as Hariya Shetty in Dabangg. He also directed the Marathi comedy Shikshanachya Aaicha Gho. His directorial film Lalbaug Parel received critical acclaim, while he won the Zee Chitra Gaurav Puraskar for his work in Marathi cinema. That year, he also served as a judge on the Zee Marathi's Maharashtracha Superstar.

In 2011, Manjrekar appeared in Ready as Ram Kapoor, the Marathi film Fakta Ladh Mhana as Bababhai, which he also directed, and Bodyguard as Rajan Mhatre. He made his directorial debut in Bengali cinema with Ami Shubhash Bolchi. In 2012, he directed Kaksparsh, for which he received a Maharashtra State Film Award for Best Director. He also produced the Marathi film Shala, which received the National Film Award. As an actor, he appeared in OMG – Oh My God! as Lawyer Sardesai. In 2013, he directed Kokanastha. He also appeared in the Hindi films Mumbai Mirror, Himmatwala, Shootout at Wadala, Once Upon a Time in Mumbai Dobaara! and Rajjo, as well as the film Arrambam. In 2014, Manjrekar appeared in Jai Ho and portrayed Pradeep Sharma in the Marathi film Rege, for which he was nominated for the Filmfare Award for Best Supporting Actor. He also played Chief Minister Vikram Adhikari in Singham Returns In 2015, he portrayed Shahujiraje Bhosale in Bajirao Mastani and appeared in the Telugu film Akhil as Divya's father. In 2016, he returned to directing after a three-year hiatus with the Marathi film Natsamrat, for which he received Filmfare Award Marathi and Zee Chitra Gaurav Puraskar. As an actor, he appeared as Bhanu Pratap Inamdar in Vrundavan, Jackie in the Telugu film Guntur Talkies, and Shyam Vahi in the Bengali film Badsha – The Don. In 2017, Manjrekar directed the youth-oriented film F.U.: Friendship Unlimited. He also appeared in Thank U Vitthala as Vitthal and Dhyanimani as Sadanand Pathak. He made his Tamil film debut with Velaikkaran, in which he played Madhav. In 2018, he appeared as himself in Sanju and played Inspector Pawar in the Marathi film Take Care Good Night. He also directed Me Shivaji Park. That year, he began hosting the first season of the Marathi reality television show Bigg Boss Marathi. In 2019, Manjrekar appeared in Mard Ko Dard Nahi Hota as Ajoba, Total Dhamaal as Chinnappa Swamy, Saaho as Prince, and the Marathi film Mulshi Pattern as Shirpya. He reprised his role as Hariya Shetty in Dabangg 3. He also directed Bhai: Vyakti Ki Valli, a biographical film based on the life of Marathi writer and humorist P. L. Deshpande. He hosted the second season of Bigg Boss Marathi.

In 2020, Manjrekar appeared in the Marathi film Kesari. He also directed the web series 1962: The War in the Hills. In 2021, he directed The Power and Antim: The Final Truth, the latter being a Hindi remake of Marathi film Mulshi Pattern. He also hosted the third season of Bigg Boss Marathi. In 2022, he appeared in the Telugu film Sarkaru Vaari Paata as the Finance Minister, the Marathi film De Dhakka 2 as Babbar Lohri, and the Hindi film Mister Mummy as Dr. Satsangi. He hosted the fourth season of Bigg Boss Marathi. He also directed the Marathi films Panghrun and Nay Varanbhat Loncha Kon Nay Koncha. In 2023, he appeared in the film Butterfly as Sahil and in the web series Taaza Khabar as Kismat Bhai. In 2024, Manjrekar directed and starred in the Marathi film Juna Furniture. He received the Filmfare Award for Best Actor for his performance. He also directed Hi Anokhi Gaath. In 2025, Manjrekar appeared in the Marathi film Devmanus as Keshav. He also appeared in the Tamil films Coolie as Kakkar and Thug Life as Sadanand Yadav, the Marathi film Dashavatar as Inspector D'Costa, and the Kannada film The Devil as Rajashekhar. In 2026, he appeared in the silent film Gandhi Talks as Premnath Gavli. He made cameo appearances in the Marathi films Raja Shivaji as Lakhuji Jadhav and Deool Band 2 as Sai Baba. He is also directing the Marathi film Bandkhor, scheduled for release on 23 September 2026. He is set to appear in the Marathi film Khashaba, scheduled for release on 1 January 2027.

=== Political career ===
He was a MNS candidate from Mumbai North West in the 2014 Lok Sabha Elections but lost to Gajanan Kirtikar of Shiv Sena.

== Filmography ==
=== Actor ===
Year	Films	Role	Language	Ref.
1991	Jeeva Sakha	Inspector Jamdade	Marathi	
1999	Vaastav: The Reality	Himself	Hindi	
2001	Ehsaas: The Feeling	Michael	Hindi	
2002	Kaante	Raja "Balli" Yadav	Hindi	
2003	Pran Jaye Par Shaan Na Jaye	Munna Bhai Hatela	Hindi	
2004	Plan	Sultan	Hindi	
2004	Run	Ganpat Chowdhury	Hindi	
2004	Musafir	Lukka	Hindi	
2005	It Was Raining That Night	Brij Bhushan	English	
2005	Encounter Daya Nayak	Yousuf Khaleel	Kannada	
2006	Zinda	Joy Fernandes	Hindi	
2006	Jawani Diwani: A Youthful Joyride	Chappu Bhai	Hindi	
2007	Dus Kahaniyaan	Mahesh	Hindi	
2007	Okkadunnadu	Sona Bhai	Telugu	
2007	Padmashree Laloo Prasad Yadav	Advocate Prasad Pritam Pradyuman	Hindi	
2007	Deha	Madhav	Hindi	
2008	Meerabai Not Out	Manoj Anant Achrekar	Hindi	
2008	Slumdog Millionaire	Don Javed	English	
2008	Homam	Daddy	Telugu	
2009	Me Shivajiraje Bhosale Boltoy	Chhatrapati Shivaji Maharaj	Marathi	
2009	Wanted	Senior Inspector Daulat R. Talpade	Hindi	
2009	99	AGM (Aatmaram Gyanshekhar Machve)	Hindi	
2009	Fruit and Nut	Khandar Zala	Hindi	
2010	Adhurs	Don Baba	Telugu	
2010	Teen Patti	Dagdu Seth	Hindi	
2010	Dabangg	Hariya Shreshawat	Hindi	
2010	Don Seenu	Mukesh Duggal / Duggal Saab	Telugu	
2011	Ready	Ram Kapoor (Prem's father)	Hindi	
2011	Fakta Ladh Mhana	Bababhai	Marathi	
2011	Bodyguard	Ranjan Mhatre	Hindi	
2012	Tukkaa Fitt		Hindi	
2012	OMG: Oh My God!	Lawyer Sardesai	Hindi	
2012	Jai Jai Maharashtra Majha		Marathi	
2013	Mumbai Mirror	ACP Gaitonde	Hindi	
2013	Himmatwala	Sher Singh	Hindi	
2013	Shootout at Wadala	Inspector Bhinde	Hindi	
2013	Once Upon a Time In Mumbaai Dobara	Local gangster Rawa	Hindi	
2013	Arrambam	Mahadev Rane	Tamil	
2013	Rajjo	Begam	Hindi	
2014	Jai Ho	Auto-Rickshaw Driver	Hindi	
2014	Rege	Pradeep Sharma	Marathi	
2014	Singham Returns	Chief Minister Vikram Adhikari	Hindi	
2014	Ardhangini by Abhishek Mukherjee		Bengali	
2015	Bajirao Mastani	Shahuji Raje Bhosale	Hindi	
2015	Akhil	Divya's father	Telugu	
2016	Vrundavan	Bhanupratap Inamdar	Marathi	
2016	Guntur Talkies	Jakie	Telugu	
2016	Badsha – The Don	Shyam Vhai	Bengali	Scenes reused from Don Seenu
2017	Thank U Vitthala	Vitthala	Marathi	
2017	Dhyanimani	Sadanand Pathak	Marathi	
2017	FU: Friendship Unlimited	Chilly's father	Marathi	
2017	Velaikkaran	Madhav Kurup	Tamil	
2018	Sanju	Himself	Hindi	
2018	Take Care Good Night	Inspector Pawar	Marathi	
2019	Mard Ko Dard Nahi Hota	Ajoba	Hindi	
2019	Vinaya Vidheya Rama	Chief Minister of Bihar	Telugu	
2019	Total Dhamaal	Chinnappa Swamy	Hindi	
2019	Saaho	Prince	Telugu	
2019	Mulshi Pattern	Shirpya	Marathi	
2019	Dabangg 3	Hariya Shreshawat	Hindi	
2019	66 Sadashiv		Marathi	
2020	Kesari	Vastad Mehman	Marathi	
2020	Taxi No. 24		Hindi	
2021	The White Tiger	The Stork	English Hindi	
2021	The Power	Kaalidas Haridas Thakur	Hindi	
2021	Boss	Baba Khan	Bhojpuri	
2021	Mumbai Saga	Chief Minister Bhau	Hindi	
2021	Antim: The Final Truth	Satyavan "Satya" Vichare	Hindi	
2022	Katha Kanchiki Manam Intiki		Telugu	
2022	Sarkaru Vaari Paata	Finance minister	Telugu	
2022	De Dhakka 2	Babbar Lahori	Marathi	
2022	Mister Mummy	Dr. Satsangi	Hindi	
2023	Butterfly	Sahil	Marathi	
2024	Yatra 2	N. Chandrababu Naidu	Telugu	
2024	Juna Furniture	Govind Shridhar Pathak	Marathi	
2025	Thug Life	Sadanand Yadav	Tamil	
2025	Coolie	Kakkar	Tamil	
2025	Devmanus	Keshav	Marathi	
2025	Dashavatar	Inspector Michael D'cousta	Marathi	
2025	The Devil	Rajashekar	Kannada	
2026	Gandhi Talks	Premnath Gavli	Sound	
2026	Raja Shivaji	Lakhuji Jadhav	Marathi; Hindi	
2026	Deool Band 2	Sai Baba	Marathi	
2026	Bandkhor	Rahul	Marathi	
2026	Don't Trouble the Trouble	Mohammed Singh Aslam	Telugu	
2026	Dashami	MLA Anand Mhatre	Marathi	
TBA	Khashaba †	TBA	Marathi	

=== Film credits ===
Year	Title	Director	Producer	Writer	Ref.
1995	Aai	Yes	Yes	Yes	
1999	Vaastav: The Reality	Yes	No	Yes	
2000	Astitva	Yes	No	Yes	
2000	Kurukshetra	Yes	No	Yes	
2000	Nidaan	Yes	No	Yes	
2000	Jis Desh Mein Ganga Rehta Hai	Yes	No	Yes	
2001	Ehsaas: The Feeling	Yes	No	Yes	
2001	Tera Mera Saath Rahen	Yes	No	Yes	
2002	Hathyar	Yes	No	Yes	
2002	Pitaah	Yes	No	Yes	
2003	Pyaar Kiya Nahin Jaatha	Yes	No	Yes	
2003	Pran Jaye Par Shaan Na Jaye	No	Yes	No	
2004	Rakht	Yes	No	Yes	
2005	It Was Raining That Night	Yes	Yes	Yes	
2005	Viruddh... Family Comes First	Yes	No	Yes	
2005	Vaah! Life Ho Toh Aisi!	Yes	No	Yes	
2006	Matichya Chuli	No	No	Yes	
2009	Me Shivajiraje Bhosale Boltoy	No	No	Yes	
2010	Shikshanachya Aaicha Gho	Yes	No	Yes	
2010	City of Gold	Yes	No	Yes	
2011	Ami Shubhash Bolchi	Yes	No	Yes	
2011	Fakt Ladh Mhana	Yes	Yes	Yes	
2012	Kaksparsh	Yes	No	No	
2012	Shala	No	Yes	No	
2013	Kokanastha	Yes	No	Yes	
2016	Natsamrat	Yes	No	Yes	
2017	FU: Friendship Unlimited	Yes	Yes	Yes	
2018	Me Shivaji Park	Yes	Yes	Yes	
2018	Shikari	No	Yes	Yes	
2019	Bhai: Vyakti Ki Valli	Yes	Yes	No	
2021	The Power	Yes	No	No	
2021	Antim: The Final Truth	Yes	No	No	
2022	Panghrun	Yes	Yes	Yes	
2022	Nay Varan Bhat Loncha Kon Nay Koncha	Yes	No	No	
2024	Hi Anokhi Gaath	Yes	Yes	Yes	
2024	Juna Furniture	Yes	No	Yes	
2025	Ek Radha Ek Meera	Yes	No	No	
2025	Punha Shivajiraje Bhosale	Yes	No	Yes	
2026	Bandkhor	Yes	No	Yes	
TBA	Vedat Marathe Veer Dudale Saath †	Yes	No	Yes	
TBA	Niravadhi †	Yes	No	No	

=== Television ===
Year	Show	Role	Ref.
2006	Jhalak Dikhhla Jaa 1	Contestant	
2009	Monica Mogre	Criminal in Case File No. 1	
2009	Specials @ 10	Director of Har Kadam Par Shaque	
2009	Arre Deewano Mujhe Pehchano	Himself (contestant)	
2010	Maharashtracha Superstar 1	Himself (Judge)	
2010	Forest	HD (Harpeez Dongra)	
2015	Agent Raghav – Crime Branch	Dilip Chauhan	
2018	Bigg Boss Marathi 1	Host	
2018	Selection Day	Sir Tommy	
2019	Bigg Boss Marathi 2	Host	
2019	TVF Cheesecake	Mirza	
2020	1962: The War in the Hills	Director	
2021	Bigg Boss Marathi 3	Host	
2022- 2023	Bigg Boss Marathi 4	Host	
2023	Taaza Khabar	Kismat Bhai	

=== Web series ===
Year	Title	Direction	Role	Language	Notes
2019	Kaale Dhande	No	Anna Bhai	Marathi	ZEE5 Originals
2020	Forbidden Love	Yes	Sudha's Husband	Hindi	ZEE5 Originals

== Production ==
In 2011, he launched his own production company with Aniruddha Deshpande called Great Maratha Entertainment LLP Productions.

The first film made under the banner was the Fakta Ladh Mhana which is one of the most expensive Marathi films.

== Awards and nominations ==
Mahesh Manjrekar awards and nominations
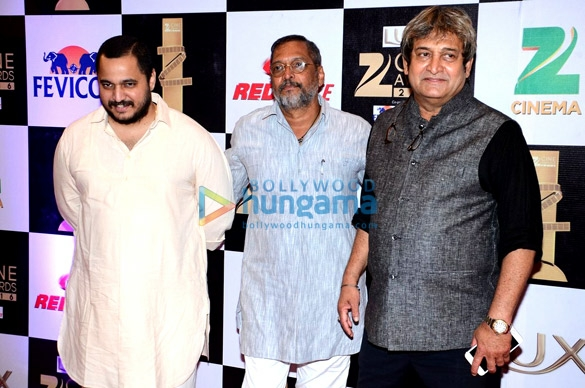
- Manjrekar with Nana Patekar and Malhar Patekar at Zee Cine Awards 2016
Awards and nominations
Award	Wins	Nominations
Filmfare Awards	1	3
IIFA Awards	1	2
Screen Awards	2	3
Zee Cine Awards	1	1
Filmfare Marathi Awards	3	4
National Film Awards	1	1
Zee Chitra Gaurav Puraskar	4	5
Maharashtra State Film Awards	8	10
Pune International Film Festival	1	1
MICTA	1	1
Maharashtracha Favourite Kon?	4	5
Sanskruti Kaladarpan	0	2
Colors Marathi Awards	2	3
Sakal Premier Awards	2	2

Totals (Note: Certain award groups do not simply award one winner. They acknowledge several different recipients, have runners-up, and have third place. Since this is a specific recognition and is different from losing an award, runner-up mentions are considered wins in this award tally. For simplification and to avoid errors, each award in this list has been presumed to have had a prior nomination.)
- Wins: 22
- Nominations: 31

National Film Awards
Year	Work	Category	Result	Ref.
2000	Astitva	Best Feature Film in Marathi	Won	

Filmfare Awards
Year	Work	Category	Result	Ref.
2000	Vaastav: The Reality	Best Director	Nominated	
2000	Vaastav: The Reality	Best Scene of the Year	Won	
2003	Kaante	Best Comedian	Nominated	

IIFA Awards
Year	Work	Category	Result	Ref.
2000	Vaastav: The Reality	Best Director	Nominated	
2003	Kaante	Best Comedian	Won	

Screen Awards
Year	Work	Category	Result	Ref.
2001	Astitva	Best Story	Won	
2001	Astitva	Best Screenplay	Nominated	
2001	Astitva	Special Jury Award	Won	

Filmfare Awards Marathi
Year	Work	Category	Result	Ref.
1994	Aai	Best Director	Won	
2016	Natsamrat	Best Director	Nominated	
2016	Natsamrat	Best Director (Critics)	Won	
2024	Juna Furniture	Best Director	Nominated	
2024	Juna Furniture	Best Actor	Won	

Zee Cine Awards
Year	Work	Category	Result	Ref.
2016	Natsamrat	Best Marathi Film	Won	

Zee Gaurav Puraskar
Year	Work	Category	Result	Ref.
2010	Me Shivajiraje Bhosale Boltoy	Best Story	Won	
2010	Me Shivajiraje Bhosale Boltoy	Best Screenplay	Won	
2012	Kaksparsh	Best Director	Nominated	
2016	Natsamrat	Best Director	Won	
2024	Juna Furniture	Best Actor	Won	

Maharashtra State Film Awards
Year	Work	Category	Result	Ref.
2000	Astitva	Best Second Film	Won	
2000	Astitva	Best Second Director	Won	
2006	Matichya Chuli	Best Screenplay	Won	
2009	Mi Shivajiraje Bhosale Boltoy!	Best Screenplay	Won	
2009	Mi Shivajiraje Bhosale Boltoy!	Best Dialogue	Won	
2012	Kaksparsh	Best Film	Won	
2012	Kaksparsh	Best Director	Won	
2022	Panghrun	Best Film	Nominated	
2022	Panghrun	Best Director	Nominated	
2025	—N/a	V. Shantaram Lifetime Achievement Award	Honoured	

Pune International Film Festival
Year	Work	Category	Result	Ref.
2012	Kaksparsh	Best Marathi Feature Film	Won	

Marathi International Cinema & Theatre Awards
Year	Work	Category	Result	Ref.
2012	Kaksparsh	Best Director	Won	

Maharashtracha Favourite Kon?
Year	Work	Category	Result	Ref.
2010	Me Shivajiraje Bhosale Boltoy	Best Film	Won	
2011	Lalbaug Parel	Best Director	Won	
2012	Kaksparsh	Best Film	Won	
2012	Kaksparsh	Best Director	Won	
2016	Natsamrat	Best Director	Nominated	

Sanskruti Kaladarpan
Year	Work	Category	Result	Ref.
2012	Kaksparsh	Best Director	Nominated	
2016	Natsamrat	Best Director	Nominated	

Colors Marathi Awards
Year	Work	Category	Result	Ref.
2019	Bigg Boss Marathi 1	Best Host	Won	
2021	Bigg Boss Marathi 2	Best Host	Nominated	
2022	Bigg Boss Marathi 3	Best Host	Won	

Sakal Premier Awards
Year	Work	Category	Result	Ref.
2019	Panghrun	Best Film	Won	
2019	Panghrun	Best Director	Won	
