= Hitesh Modak =

- Origin: Mumbai, Maharastra, India
- Occupations: Music Composer, Producer, Arranger
- Years active: 1997–present
- Labels: Yashraj music, Times Music, T-Series

Hitesh Modak is a music composer, arranger and producer from Mumbai. He is the arranger and music producer of the track "Moh Moh Ke Dhaage" from the film Dum Laga Ke Haisha.

== Life ==
He is born in an economically challenged family in Mumbai. Before Bollywood, he played in various bands and performed in international stage shows.

== Career ==
Modak established his identity in Bollywood as an arranger and producer. His song "Moh Moh ke Dhaage" from Dum Laga Ke Haisha won in several categories at the 63rd National Awards. He has written background scores for films like Shaitaan, Ishqzaade, Daawat-e-Ishq, Qaidi Band and Simran. He has arranged and produced songs like "Qareeb Qareeb Single" (Daana Paani), Hichki ( Oye Hichki, Teri Dastaan), Sunder Sushil, Welcome back song ( 20/20), Chadta Sooraj, Ye pal, Indu Sarkar songs, Begum Jaan film songs such as Holi, O re Kaharo, Aazadiya, Murshida, Prem mei tohre and Home ( An ALT Balaji Web Series). Recently Home has been nominated in ITA awards.

He has remade a Yash Raj Films song with Aditya Chopra and Shiv Rawal, "Ni Main Yaar Manana Ni" Dance Mix ft. Vaani Kapoor. Among his upcoming ventures are a Marathi film with Majesh Manjrekar, untitled Bollywood movies and a web series with Ehswar Niwas. Esani Dey was the guitarist and co-arranger of PM Narendra Modi.

Modak was the music composer of the film, PM Narendra Modi, writing the songs "Namo Namo" (lyrics : Lavraj, Parry G ), "Junoon" (lyrics: Lavraj) and "Ishwar Allah" (original lyrics by Javed Akhtar). He has received a Black Swan Award in 2019 for the movie. He was also the composer, arranger and producer in Marathi Big Boss season 2.

== Filmography (as music composer) ==
- Hero Naam Yaad Rakhi (2015)
- Main Yaar Manana Ni Dance Mix ft. Vaani Kapoor (2017)
- Ek Dopahar (short film) (2017)
- Home (2018)
- Yeh Saali Aashiqui (2019)
- PM Narendra Modi (2019)
- Jinde Meriye (2020)
- Antim: The Final Truth (2021)
- Har Har Mahadev (2022)
- Pangharun (2022)
- Jogira Sara Ra Ra (2023)
- Juna Furniture (2024)
- Punha Shivajiraje Bhosale (2025)
- Mardini (2026)
- Bandkhor (2026)
- Vedat Marathe Veer Daudle Saat (TBA)

== As arranger and producer ==
- Dum Laga Ke Haisha ("Moh Moh ke Dhaage", "Sunder Susheel") (2015)
- Welcome Back ("20/20") (2015)
- Daana Paani (2018)
- Indu Sarkar (2017)
- Begum Jaan ("O Re Kaharo", "Aazadiyan", "Murshida", "Prem Mein Tohre") (2017)
- Hichki ("Oye Hichki", "Teri Dastaan") (2018)

== Background score composer ==
- Shaitaan (2011)
- Ishaqzaade (2012)
- Daawat-e-Ishq (2014)
- Qaidi Band (2017)
- Sandeep Aur Pinky Faraar (2021)

== Awards ==
- "Moh Moh Ke Dhaage" from Dum Laga Ke Haisha won a National award. Modak was the arranger and music producer of the song.
- Black Swan Award 2019 for composition in PM Narendra Modi
