= MFK Award for Favourite Villain =

Indian film award

Maharashtracha Favourite Kon? for Favourite Villain
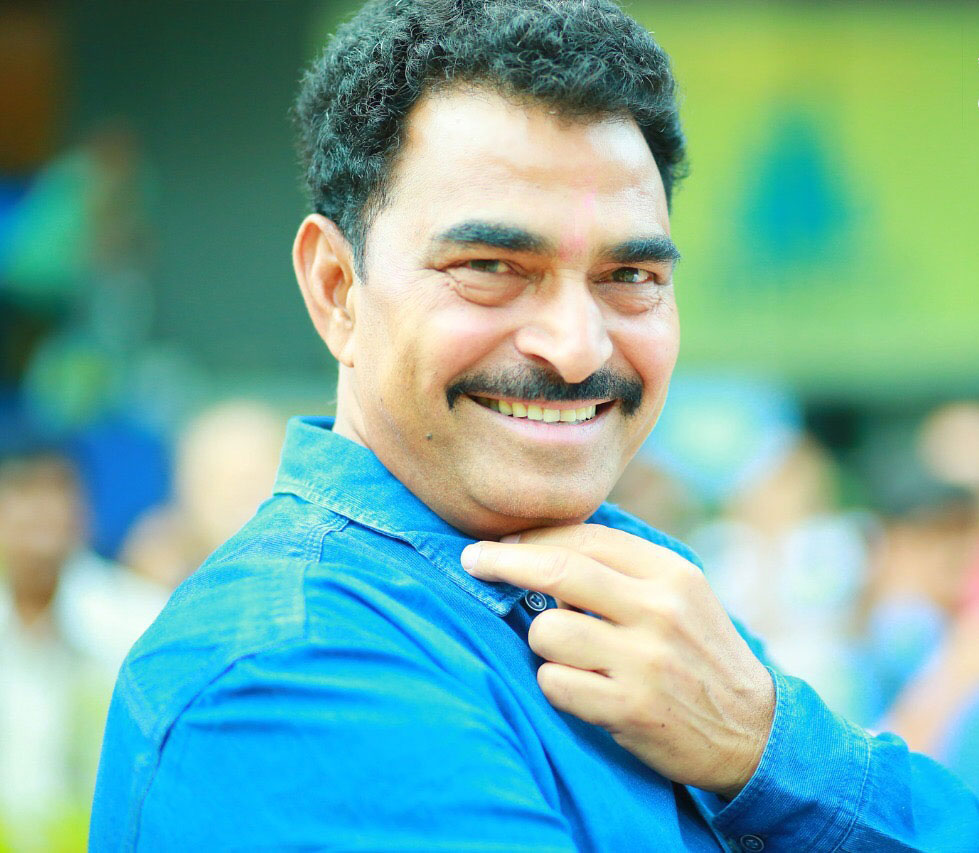
- The 2023 recipient: Sayaji Shinde
- Awarded for: Best Performance by an Actor in a Negative Role
- Country: India
- Presented by: Zee Talkies
- First award: Siddhartha Jadhav, Galgale Nighale (2009)
- Currently held by: Sayaji Shinde, Ghar Banduk Biryani (2023)

Maharashtracha Favourite Kon? Award for Favourite Villain is a film award given by Zee Talkies as part of its annual Maharashtracha Favourite Kon? ceremony for Marathi films. The award was first given in 2009.

== Winners and nominees ==
Year	Photos of winners	Actor	Role(s)	Film	Ref.
2009		Siddhartha Jadhav †	Andya Banjo	Galgale Nighale	
2009		Ramesh Deo		Galgale Nighale	
2009		Lokesh Gupte	Baban	Uladhaal	
2010		Sayaji Shinde †	Chandrakant Tope	Gallit Gondhal, Dillit Mujra	
2010		Ankush Chaudhari	Inspector Abhijit Sardesai	Gaiir	
2010		Ganesh Yadav	Rangrav	Huppa Huiyya	
2011		Sachin Khedekar †	Madhusudan Patil	Fakta Ladh Mana	
2011		Sameer Dharmadhikari	Mahendra	Lalbaug Parel	
2011		Vidyadhar Joshi	Chajed	Haapus	
2012		Vaibhav Mangle †	Upadhyay	Kaksparsh	
2012		Vidyadhar Joshi	Prataprao	Sharyat	
2012		Murali Sharma	Mukhiya	Ajintha	
2013		Jitendra Joshi †	Sainath Dedgaonkar	Duniyadari	
2013		Sharad Ponkshe	Baba	Mokya Swaas	
2013		Murli Sharma	Prakash Jadhav	Vijay Aso	
2013		Kanistha Kamath		Kokanastha	
2013		Ashutosh Rana	Appa Kulkarni	Yeda	
2014		Sharad Kelkar †	Sangram	Lai Bhaari	
2015	Not Awarded				
2016		Sachin Pilgaonkar †	Khansaheb Aftab Hussain Bareliwale	Katyar Kaljat Ghusali	
2016		Suraj Pawar	Prince	Sairat	
2016		Suresh Vishwakarma	Tatya	Sairat	
2016		Sanjay Khapre	Mama	Dagadi Chawl	
2017		Girish Kulkarni †	Appa	Faster Fene	
2017		Kiran Karmarkar	Madhubhai	Kanha	
2017		Hemant Dhome	Samsher Patil	Bagtos Kay Mujhra Kar	
2017		Zhakir Hussain	Fernandez Sir	Boyz	
2018		Pravin Tarde †	Nanya Bhai	Mulshi Pattern	
2018		Omkar Bhojane	Naru Bondwe	Boyz 2	
2018		Manoj Joshi	Keshav Bhatt	Dashakriya	
2018		Devendra Gaikwad	Vikram Dada	Baban	
2019	Not Awarded				
2021		Pravin Tarde †	Nanya Bhai	Mulshi Pattern	
2021		Sayaji Shinde	Chandrakant Tope	Gallit Gondhal, Dillit Mujra	
2021		Sachin Khedekar	Madhusudan Patil	Fakta Ladh Mhana	
2021		Vaibhav Mangle	Upadhyay	Kaksparsh	
2021		Jitendra Joshi	Sainath Dedgaonkar	Duniyadari	
2021		Sharad Kelkar	Sangram	Lai Bhaari	
2021		Sachin Pilgaonkar	Khansaheb Aftab Hussain Bareliwale	Katyar Kaljat Ghusali	
2021		Girish Kulkarni	Appa	Faster Fene	
2022		Prajakta Mali †	Karunatai Pathare	Pandu	
2022		Vaibhav Mangle	Madhav Lele	Timepass 3	
2022		Milind Shinde	Siddi Johar	Har Har Mahadev	
2022		Mukesh Rishi	Afzalkhan	Sher Shivraj	
2022		Vidyadhar Joshi	Neeraj Dedhiya	De Dhakka 2	
