= MFK Award for Favourite Supporting Actor =

Indian film award

Maharashtracha Favourite Kon? for Favourite Supporting Actor
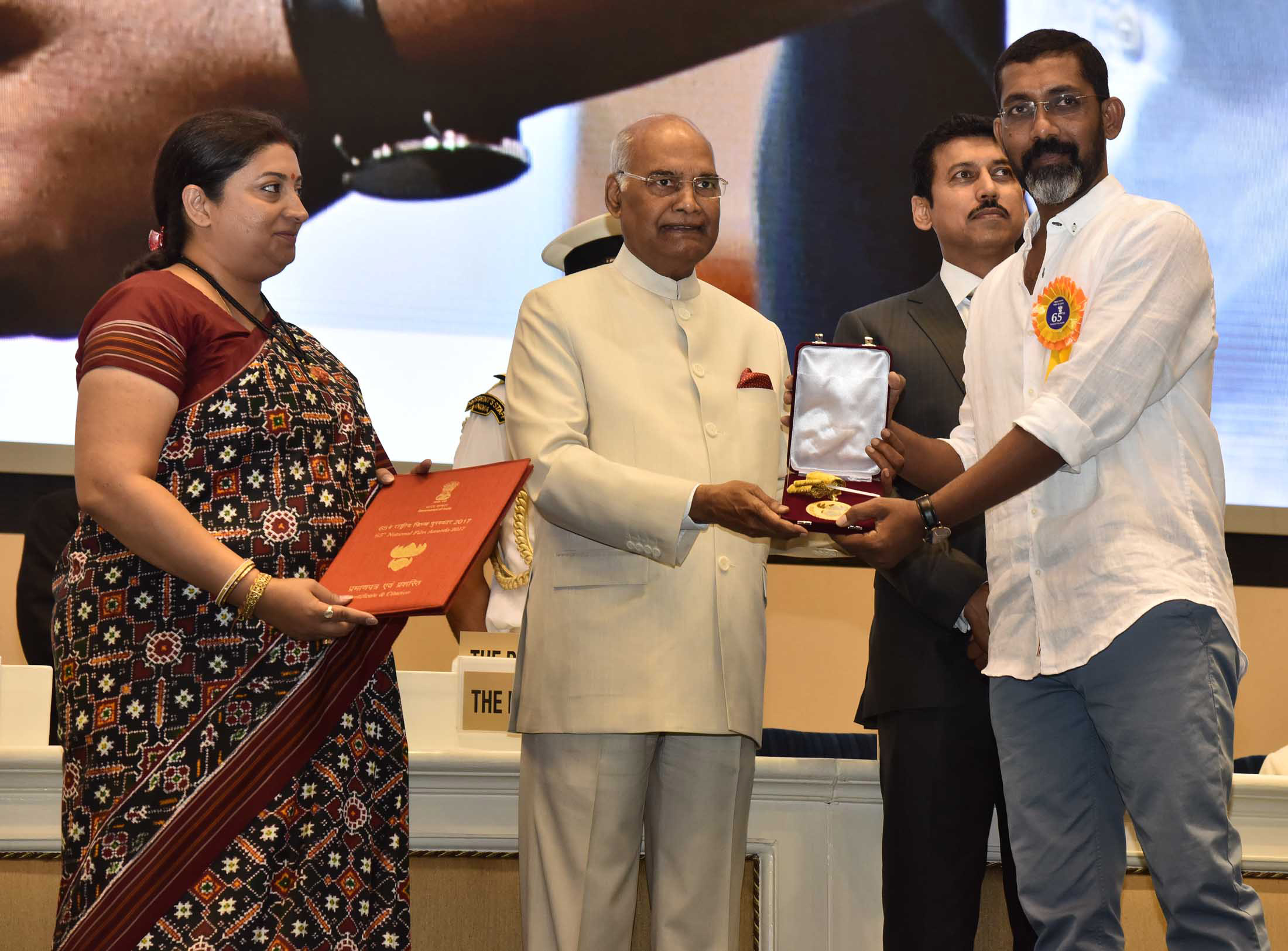
- The 2022 recipient: Nagraj Manjule for Ghar Banduk Biryani
- Awarded for: Best Performance by an Actor in a Supporting Role
- Country: India
- Presented by: Zee Talkies
- First award: Siddharth Jadhav, Lalbaug Parel (2011)
- Currently held by: Nagraj Manjule, Ghar Banduk Biryani (2023)

Maharashtracha Favourite Kon? Award for Favourite Supporting Actor is given by Zee Talkies as part of its annual Maharashtracha Favourite Kon? ceremony for Marathi films. Although the awards started in 2009, awards for the Best Supporting Actress category started in 2011.

== Superlatives ==
Superlatives	Director	Record
Actor with most awards	Siddhartha Jadhav; Ankush Chaudhari	2
Actor with most nominations	Siddhartha Jadhav	6
Actor with most consecutive nominations	Hrishikesh Joshi (2012-2013); Pushkar Shrotri (2014-2015); Dilip Prabhavalkar (2017-2018); Siddhartha Jadhav (2017-2018) (2021-2022); Vaibhav Mangle (2021-2022)	2
Actor with most nominations without ever winning	Bhau Kadam	3

== Winners and nominees ==
Year	Photos of winners	Actor	Role(s)	Film	Ref.
2011		Siddhartha Jadhav †	Speedbreaker	Lalbaug Parel	
2011		Bhau Kadam	Havaldar	Mast Challay Amcha	
2011		Sanjay Narvekar	Kanfatya	Fakta Ladh Mhana	
2012		Jitendra Joshi †	Pankaj	Zhakaas	
2012		Hrishikesh Joshi	Sandesh	Masala	
2012		Pandharinath Kamble	Nayanrao	Yedyanchi Jatra	
2012		Ketan Pawar	Surya Mhatre	Shala	
2012		Anand Ingale	Makad	Badam Rani Gulam Chor	
2013		Ankush Chaudhari †	Digambar Shankar Patil	Duniyadari	
2013		Siddhartha Jadhav	Himmatrao Dondepatil	Time Please	
2013		Upendra Limaye	Gautam	Kokanastha	
2013		Hrishikesh Joshi	PD Shinde	Aajcha Divas Majha	
2013		Subodh Bhave	Shrikant	Anumati	
2014		Pushkar Shrotri †	Sachin Waze	Rege	
2014		Sharad Kelkar	Sangram	Lai Bhaari	
2014		Bhau Kadam	Appa	Timepass	
2014		Manoj Joshi	Rangarao Khot	Narbachi Wadi	
2015		Vaibhav Mangle †	Shakal	Timepass	
2015		Vidyadhar Joshi	Amit's Father	Double Seat	
2015		Siddharth Chandekar	Ani	Classmates	
2015		Pushkar Shrotri	Gajanan	A Paying Ghost	
2015		Sandeep Pathak	Malaria	Timepass 2	
2016		Tanaji Galgunde †	Langdya	Sairat	
2016		Vikram Gokhale	Rambhau	Natsamrat	
2016		Jitendra Joshi	Bharatrao Zende	Poshter Girl	
2016		Prashant Damle	Shekhar Pradhan	Mumbai-Pune-Mumbai 2	
2016		Makarand Deshpande	Daddy	Dagadi Chawl	
2017		Sachin Khedekar †	Alok's Father	Muramba	
2017		Dilip Prabhavalkar	B. R. Bhagwat	Faster Fene	
2017		Siddhartha Jadhav	Ambadas	Faster Fene	
2017		Ashutosh Gowariker	Raja Kamerkar	Ventilator	
2017		Bhau Kadam	Zatkya	Jaundya Na Balasaheb	
2017		Pushkaraj Chirputkar	Mauli	Baapjanma	
2018		Nagraj Manjule †	Chaitya's Father	Naal	
2018		Dilip Prabhavalkar	Patresavkar	Dashakriya	
2018		Siddhartha Jadhav	Sunny	Ye Re Ye Re Paisa	
2018		Sanjay Narvekar	Anna	Ye Re Ye Re Paisa	
2018		Upendra Limaye	Inspector Vitthal Kadu	Mulshi Pattern	
2018		Mohan Joshi	Tatya	Pushpak Vimaan	
2019		Prasad Oak †	Chhatrapati Shivaji Maharaj	Hirkani	
2019		Kushal Badrike	Photographer	Rampaat	
2019		Anand Ingale	Pradhyumna/Tenya	Ye Re Ye Re Paisa 2	
2019		Ankit Mohan	Yesaji Kank	Fatteshikast	
2019		Ajay Purkar	Tanaji Malusare	Fatteshikast	
2021		Ankush Chaudhari †	Digambar Shankar Patil	Duniyadari	
2021		Siddhartha Jadhav	Speedbreaker	Lalbaug Parel	
2021		Jitendra Joshi	Pankaj	Zhakaas	
2021		Pushkar Shrotri	Sachin Waze	Rege	
2021		Vaibhav Mangle	Shakal	Timepass 2	
2021		Tanaji Galgunde	Langdya	Sairat	
2021		Sachin Khedekar	Alok's Father	Muramba	
2021		Nagraj Manjule	Chaitya's Father	Naal	
2021		Prasad Oak	Chhatrapati Shivaji Maharaj	Hirkani	
2022		Siddhartha Jadhav †	Dhanaji	De Dhakka 2	
2022		Kushal Badrike	Mahadu	Pandu	
2022		Vaibhav Mangle	Gopinath Pant Bokila	Sher Shivraj	
2022		Sanjay Narvekar	Dinkar Patil	Timepass 3	
2022		Kshitish Date	Eknath Shinde	Dharmaveer	
2023		Nagraj Manjule †	Chaitya's father	Naal 2	
2023		Jitendra Joshi	Ajinath	Naal 2	
2023		Siddharth Chandekar	Kabir Kulkarni	Jhimma 2	
2023		Subhankar Tawde	Jonty	Ved	
2023		Akash Thosar	Raju Achari	Ghar Banduk Biryani	
