= Amitraj =

Music director

Amitraj Sawant
- Born: 21 February 1979 (age 47)
- Genres: Indian film music
- Occupations: Music director, Composer, Music arranger, Programmer, Conductor, Song writer, Playback singer, Producer
- Years active: 2011–present

Amitraj Sawant is a Marathi music director-composer and singer from Mumbai.

== Career ==
He began his career as an assistant to composer Monty Sharma, known for his work on films like Devdas, Saawariya and Black. He spent over eight years working with Sharma, gaining experience and exposure to Sanjay Leela Bhansali’s grand filmmaking style and understanding of music. After this period, he decided to pursue independent work.

In 2011, he began composing background scores and title tracks for television serials, contributing to over five shows with more than 200 episodes. During this time, he connected with filmmaker Rajiv Patil, who offered him the opportunity to work on the film 72 Miles: Ek Pravas.

He composed a track "Deva Tujhya Gabharyala", from the movie Duniyadari.

Since then, he has composed music for various Marathi films, including Classmates, Mitwaa, Dagadi Chawl, Poshter Girl, Baghtos Kay Mujra Kar, Laal Ishq, Farzand, Hirkani, and the recent success Jhimma and Jhimma 2.

== Discography ==
=== Films ===
Year	Film	Director	Ref.
2013	72 Miles	Rajiv Patil	
2013	Duniyadari	Sanjay Jadhav	
2013	Vijay Aso	Rahul Jadhav	
2013	Asa Mee Ashi Tee	Atul Kale	
2013	Vanshvel	Rajiv Patil	
2014	Pyaar Vali Love Story	Sanjay Jadhav	
2014	Hello Nandan	Rahul Jadhav	
2015	Classmates	Aditya Sarpotdar	
2015	Mitwaa	Swapna Waghmare Joshi	
2015	Welcome Zindagi	Umesh Ghadge	
2015	Tu Hi Re	Sanjay Jadhav	
2015	Dagadi Chawl	Chandrakant Kanse	
2016	Friends	R. Madhesh	
2016	Guru	Sanjay Jadhav	
2016	Bandh Nylonche	Jatin Wagle	
2016	Poshter Girl	Sameer Patil	
2016	Vrundavan	T. L. V. Prasad	
2016	Laal Ishq	Swapna Waghmare Joshi	
2016	1234	Milind Kavde	
2017	Baghtos Kay Mujra Kar	Hemant Dhome	
2017	Fugay	Swapna Waghmare Joshi	
2017	Andya Cha Funda	Santosh Shetty	
2017	Tula Kalnnaar Nahi	Swapna Waghmare Joshi	
2017	Dashakriya	Sandeep Patil	
2017	Deva	Murali Nallappa	
2018	Ye Re Ye Re Paisa	Sanjay Jadhav	
2018	Farzand	Digpal Lanjekar	
2018	Party	Sachin Darekar	
2018	Savita Damodar Paranjpe	Swapna Waghmare Joshi	
2019	Luckee	Sanjay Jadhav	
2019	Premwaari	Rajendra Gaikwad	
2019	Bandishala	Milind Lele	
2019	Hirkani	Prasad Oak	
2021	Befaam	Krishna Kamble	
2021	Jeet	Sagar Chavan	
2021	Jhimma	Hemant Dhome	
2022	Tamasha Live	Sanjay Jadhav	
2022	Daagadi Chawl 2	Chandrakant Kanse	
2022	Timepass 3	Ravi Jadhav	
2023	Satarcha Salman	Hemant Dhome	
2023	Sari	K. S. Ashoka	
2023	Ravrambha	Anup Jagdale	
2023	Jhimma 2	Hemant Dhome	
2024	Satyashodhak	Nilesh Jalamkar	
2024	Sridevi Prasanna	Vishal Modhave	
2024	Like Aani Subscribe	Abhishek Merurkar	
2024	Kavya	Tushar Zagade	
2024	Manmauji	Sheetal Shetty	
2024	Ye Re Ye Re Paisa 3	Sanjay Jadhav	
2025	Fussclass Dabhade	Hemant Dhome	
2025	Ashi Hi Jamva Jamvi	Lokesh Gupte	
2025	Asambhav	Sachit Patil, Pushkar Shrotri	

== Awards and nominations ==
Year	Award	Category	Film	Result
2013	Zee Chitra Gaurav Puraskar	Best Music Director	Duniyadari	Nominated
2013	Maharashtracha Favourite Kon?	Favourite Song	Duniyadari	Nominated
2014	Maharashtra Times Sanman Awards	Best Music Director	Duniyadari	Won
2015	Maharashtracha Favourite Kon?	Favourite Song	Classmates	Nominated
2017	Maharashtra State Film Awards	Best Music Director	Dashakriya	Won
2017	3rd Filmfare Awards Marathi	Best Music Director	Poshter Girl	Nominated
2018	4th Filmfare Awards Marathi	Best Music Director	Tula Kalnnaar Nahi	Nominated
2019	Maharashtracha Favourite Kon?	Favourite Song	Khari Biscuit	Won
2019	Maharashtra State Film Awards	Best Music Director	Hirkani	Won
2020	5th Filmfare Awards Marathi	Best Music Director	Hirkani	Nominated
2021	6th Filmfare Awards Marathi	Best Music Director	Jhimma	Won
2021	Maharashtra State Film Awards	Best Music Director	Jhimma	Won
2022	7th Filmfare Awards Marathi	Best Music Director	Tamasha Live	Nominated
2023	8th Filmfare Awards Marathi	Best Music Director	Jhimma 2	Nominated
