= Noorondu Nenapu =

- Theatrical Poster
- Directed by: Kumaresh M
- Written by: Praveen Sutar
- Produced by: Suraj Desai; Manish Desai
- Starring: Chetan; Meghana Raj; Rajavardan; Sushmita Joshi; Yash Shetty; Archana
- Narrated by: Meghana Raj
- Cinematography: S.K. Rao
- Edited by: Lawrence Kishore
- Music by: Gagan Baderiya
- Production company: 3 Lion Production
- Release date: 9 June 2017
- Country: India
- Language: Kannada

Noorondu Nenapu is a 2017 Indian Kannada romantic drama film set in the 1980s, directed by Kumaresh M. The story of the film was written by Late Shri Suhas Shirvalkar, dialogues rewritten by Praveen Sutar, and screenplay by Chinmay Mandlekar (Marathi). It is produced by Suraj Desai and Manish Desai under the banner of 3 Lion Production. It is the official remake of Sanjay Jadhav's Marathi film, Duniyadari, which was based on the novel of the same name by Suhas Shirvalkar.

Noorondu Nenapu stars Chetan, Meghana Raj, Rajavardan, Sushmita Joshi, Yash Shetty, and debutant Rajavardhan in the lead roles. It portrays the saga of love and the tale of friendship back in the 1980s.

In August 2016, director Kumaresh M took the Mahurat shot and Bengaluru socialite S. K. Rao rolled the cameras. The major parts of the movie were shot in Belagavi for its scenic beauty. The view of the college was taken at the University of Agricultural Sciences, Dharwad. The sensational music was given by Gagan Baderiya. The filming was completed in October 2016, and the first teaser was launched on 1 January 2017.

== Cast ==
- Chetan Kumar as Shreyas Bahadur
- Meghana Raj as Shruthi Aras
- Raj Ninasam as Pritam Aras
- Rajavardan as DSP Digambar Shankar Patil
- Sushmita Joshi as Meenakshi
- Yash Shetty as Sainath Rao
- Archana as Rekha
- Rajesh Nataranga as MK
- Sidlingu Sridhar as Javare Gowda
- Veena Sundar as Rani Ma
- Sunder as Bahadur

== Production ==
3 Lion Production is an Indian production company established by Suraj Desai and Manish Desai. It is indulged in producing movies and is based in Bangalore. In 2017, 3 Lion Productions will release a multiple-star cast movie Noorondu Nenapu which is a Kannada remake of Sanjay Jadhav's Marathi film Duniyadari. 3 Lion Productions has officially announced to be coming up with various projects down the line.

== Soundtrack ==
Gagan Baderiya composed the film's soundtrack which consists of four tracks.

Track list
No.	Title	Lyrics	Singer(s)	Length
1.	"Baaro Baaro Geleya"	Praveen Sutar	Vijay Prakash	02:50
2.	"Kullam Khulla"	Kaviraj	Haricharan	03:56
