= Zhakaas =

Marathi language movie

Zakaas
- Promotional poster
- झकास
- Directed by: Ankush Chaudhari
- Screenplay by: Nitin Dixit; Ankush Chaudhari
- Story by: Deepak Naidu
- Produced by: Zee Talkies
- Starring: Ankush Choudhary; Amruta Khanvilkar; Sai Tamhankar; Pooja Sawant
- Cinematography: Sanjay Jadhav
- Music by: Abhijit Kavathalkar
- Release date: 30 December 2011
- Country: India
- Language: Marathi

Zakaas is a 2011 Marathi comedy film directed by Ankush Chaudhari. It stars Ankush Chaudhari, Amruta Khanvilkar, Sai Tamhankar and Pooja Sawant in lead roles. Upon release film received positive response from audience and critics. The film won three awards at Maharashtracha Favourite Kon?, including Favourite Comedy Film, Favourite Actress for Khanvilkar and Favourite Supporting Actor for Jitendra Joshi.

== Plot ==
Ankush Chaudhari portrays three distinct characters—Subhanya, Sandy, and Suhas—a charming imposter who skillfully juggles romantic relationships with three women: Manjula, Neha and Anagha. As a bachelor adept at playing multiple personas, Ankush finds himself entangled in a web of romance and intrigue. When trouble arises, he turns to his trusted friend Pankaj for help. However, each of the women has admirers of their own—Sachin, Rahul, and Ganpya —who are determined to thwart Ankush's schemes. To keep everyone at bay and maintain his deception, Ankush concocts an elaborate lie, claiming to be a CBI officer on a secret mission, leading to a delightful mix of comedy, chaos, and romance.

== Cast ==
- Ankush Chaudhari as Sandy/ Suhas/ Subhan/ Avinash
- Amruta Khanvilkar as Manjula
- Sai Tamhankar as Neha
- Pooja Sawant as Anagha
- Jeetendra Joshi as Pankaj
- Pushkar Shrotri as Sachin
- Atul Parchure as Inspector Jadhav
- Sanjay Khapre as Rahul
- Vikas Samudre as Ganpya
- Jaywant Wadkar as Bhai Kolhe
