= Ankush Chaudhari =

Indian actor (born 1973)

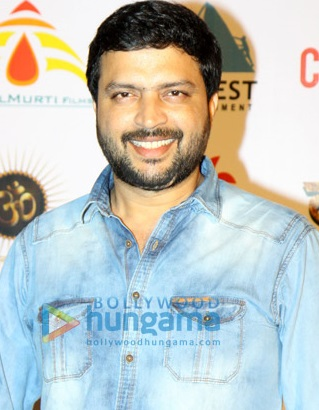
- Born: 31 January 1973 (age 53); Bombay, Maharashtra, India
- Occupations: Actor; director; producer; screenwriter
- Years active: 1995–present
- Spouse: Deepa Parab (m. 2007)
- Children: 1

Ankush Chaudhari (pronounced [əŋkuʃ t͡səu̯dʱəɾiː]; born 31 January 1973) is an Indian actor, screenwriter, director, and producer who works predominantly in Marathi cinema. Regarded as one of the most successful and highest-paid actors in the industry, he has built a career spanning film, television, and theatre over more than three decades. He has received several accolades including three Filmfare Awards Marathi, three MaTa Sanman and eight Maharashtracha Favourite Kon awards.

Born in Pune and raised in a working-class household in the Parel chawls of Mumbai, Chaudhari helped support his family as a boy while nurturing an early interest in performance through school and college cultural events. While studying in College, he took his first steps into stage acting, and in 1990 he joined Maharashtrachi Lokdhara, a folk-theatre production, which drew him toward a full-time career in the performing arts. He made his film debut with Suna Yeti Ghara in 1995 and subsequently appeared in Marathi and Hindi films as well as television productions. He came to wider attention through films including Savarkhed Ek Gaon (2004), Matichya Chuli, Yanda Kartavya Aahe, and Aai Shappath..! (2006) and Checkmate (2008). He also established himself as a filmmaker, directing the commercially successful comedies Saade Maade Teen (2007) and Zhakaas (2011), followed by No Entry Pudhe Dhoka Aahey (2012).

His performance as Digya in Duniyadari (2013) became a significant milestone in his career, and in 2015, he starred in Classmates, Double Seat and Dagadi Chawl, all of which performed strongly at the box office. that consolidated his status as a star of the industry. He subsequently appeared in films including Ti Saddhya Kay Karte (2017), Dhurala (2020) and Maharashtra Shahir (2023). His performance in Dhurala earned him the Filmfare Award for Best Actor, while his portrayal of Krishnarao Sable in Maharashtra Shahir earned him several awards. In 2026, he returned to directing with Punha Ekda Sade Made Teen, a sequel to Saade Maade Teen, and made his digital debut with the psychological crime series Devkhel.

Chaudhari is married to actress Deepa Parab, whom he met in college and later co-starred with in All the Best, and they married in 2007 and have one son. In addition to his work in cinema, Chaudhari has hosted and judged Marathi television programmes, appeared at major award ceremonies, and worked as a brand ambassador for several brands and sporting organisations.

== Early life ==
Chaudhari was born on 31 January 1973 in Pune, Maharashtra. He grew up in modest circumstances in a chawl in the Parel area of Mumbai, and as a boy he sold fruits and vegetables alongside his father to help support the family. Despite the family's financial struggles, his interest in performing never faded; he took part in solo competitions and in cultural programmes at school and college before progressing to dramas and full-fledged theatrical productions.

He studied at Maharshi Dayanand College in Mumbai, where he also began acting on stage. Around 1990, he got an opportunity to perform in Maharashtrachi Lokdhara, a folk stage programme associated with the singer Shahir Sable, an experience that drew him further toward a career in performance. During this period, he grew close to fellow theatre artists Bharat Jadhav, Kedar Shinde and Sanjay Narvekar, with whom he staged the play All the Best in 1993, in which he played a blind character; the play quickly became a success and gave him his first taste of recognition on the Marathi stage. His collaboration with Shinde, in particular, produced several successful one-act plays, including Housefull, which was also well received by audiences that established him in Marathi theatre before he moved into films and television.

== Career ==
=== Early career (1995–2004) ===
Chaudhari made his film debut in 1995 with Suna Yeti Ghara, although the film did not achieve wide popularity. He subsequently moved to television, appearing in supporting and character roles in Raja Aur Rancho (1997–98) on DD Metro, followed by Teesra Dola (1998) on Doordarshan, Aabhalmaya (1999–2000), opposite Harshada Khanvilkar, and Bedhund Manachi Lahar (2002) on Alpha TV Marathi.

In 2000, Chaudhari took a small role in Mahesh Manjrekar's Hindi film Jis Desh Mein Ganga Rehta Hain, playing Ganga's (Govinda) spoiled younger brother, the role brought him wider recognition and made Marathi producers take notice of him. That year, he also appeared in several Marathi family drama films, including Soon Asavi Ashi, Tuch Majhi Bhagya Lakshmi and Asaj Pahije Nav Nav. After a comparatively quiet period, he returned to prominence in 2004 with Savarkhed Ek Gaon, an ensemble thriller in which he portrayed an NRI who investigates mysterious events in his native village, opposite Sonali Khare, and also starred in the romantic drama Mi Tuji Tujhich Re, alongside Sharvari Jamenis and Subodh Bhave, as a loving husband and supportive friend. For Savarkhed Ek Gaon, he received nominations for Best Actor at the Maharashtra State Film Award and Zee Chitra Gaurav Puraskar. This period marked the beginning of his emergence as a leading actor in Marathi film industry.

=== Rise to prominence (2006–2010) ===
The year 2006 marked a major turning point, with five of Chaudhari's films being released. In Matichya Chuli, he portrayed a husband caught between his mother and wife, alongside Madhura Velankar and Vandana Gupte. The film was a commercial success and received praise for its humorous, slice-of-life depiction of family relationships. His chemistry with Smita Shewale was also appreciated in the romance Yanda Kartavya Aahe, in which an arranged-marriage couple gradually falls in love during their honeymoon. Its song "Aabhas Ha" subsequently became a cult classic. He next earned a nomination for Best Supporting Actor at the Zee Chitra Gaurav Puraskar for his performance in Sanjay Surkar's critically acclaimed Aai Shappath..!. He played the guardian of a young woman who wishes to marry him, alongside Manasi Salvi, Reema Lagoo and Shreyas Talpade. He also reunited with Kedar Shinde for the ensemble comedy Majha Navra Tujhi Bayko and made a special appearance in the song "Ye Go Ye Ye Maina" in Shinde's comedy Jatra: Hyalagaad Re Tyalagaad.

Chaudhari subsequently starred opposite Bharat Jadhav in the comedy Ishhya, playing a married man who unexpectedly begins exhibiting symptoms of pregnancy. He then co-directed the comedy Saade Maade Teen with Sachit Patil, a remake of the Hindi classic Chalti Ka Naam Gaadi (1958). The film featured Ashok Saraf, Bharat Jadhav and Makarand Anaspure in roles based on the Ganguly brothers, while Amruta Khanvilkar reprised the role played by Madhubala in the original. It was both a critical and commercial success, grossing ₹4.50 crore (equivalent to ₹15 crore or US$1.6 million in 2026) and becoming one of the highest grossing Marathi film of its time.

In 2008, Chaudhari starred in two commercially and critically successful thrillers: Sanjay Jadhav's Checkmate and Aditya Sarpotdar's Uladhaal. Checkmate earned him his second Maharashtra State Film Award nomination. He later portrayed a culprit posing as an inspector in Satish Rajwade's mystery thriller Gaiir (2009), one of the most expensive Marathi productions of its time. The film was both a critical and commercial success, and Chaudhari received a nomination for Favourite Villain at the Maharashtracha Favourite Kon awards. He experienced a comparatively unsuccessful year in 2010, with Sanjay Jadhav's thriller Ringa Ringa, Mahesh Manjrekar's bilingual political drama City of Gold, and the ensemble crime drama Target failing to perform strongly at the box office. He followed these with Shahanpan Dega Deva and Pratibimb in 2011.

=== Direction and commercial success (2011–2016) ===
He then directed and starred in the comedies Zhakaas and No Entry Pudhe Dhoka Aahey. He also wrote the screenplay for Zhakaas, while No Entry Pudhe Dhoka Aahey was a remake of Anees Bazmee's 2005 film No Entry, with Sai Tamhankar reprising the role originally played by Bipasha Basu. Zhakaas became one of the year's major commercial successes and won three awards at the Maharashtracha Favourite Kon awards, including Favourite Comedy Film. Reviewer Chetana Gavkhadkar Panchal observed that Chaudhari "suits in that character but he has not used any extra ordinary skills in presenting three different roles, except for changing his get ups". No Entry Pudhe Dhoka Aahey achieved moderate commercial success, while Prasanna D. Zore of Rediff praised Chaudhari's work as both actor and director.

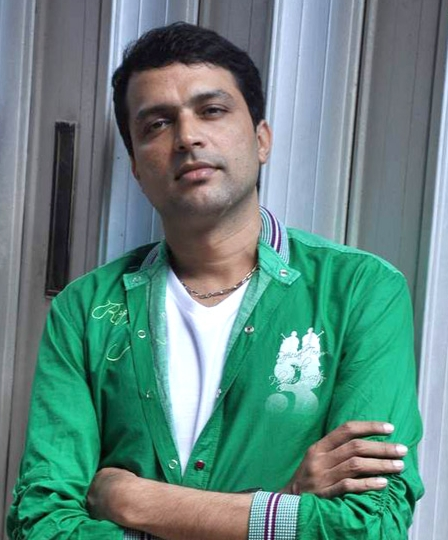
Chaudhari at the press meet of No Entry Pudhe Dhoka Aahey in 2012

In 2013, Chaudhari appeared in six films, with his most prominent performance coming as Digya in Sanjay Jadhav's coming-of-age film Duniyadari, based on the novel of the same name by Suhas Shirvalkar. He portrayed a rowdy but fiercely loyal college student who becomes one of Shreyas's (Swapnil Joshi) closest friends and supports him through his romantic and personal struggles. Aparna Phadke of The Times of India praised Chaudhari's screen presence, describing it as "truly riveting". Duniyadari grossed ₹32 crore (equivalent to ₹59 crore or US$6.3 million in 2026), becoming the highest grossing Marathi film at the time, while Chaudhari's performance earned him several Best Supporting Actor honours, including the MaTa Sanman. He next starred opposite Bhojpuri actress Madhu Sharma in Vaadhdivsachya Haardik Shubhechcha and took on his first outright negative role in Por Bazaar, directed by actress Manava Naik.

His first release of 2015 was Aditya Sarpotdar's ensemble college thriller Classmates, a remake of the 2006 Malayalam film of the same name. The film was both critical and commercial successful, grossing ₹21 crore (equivalent to ₹35 crore or US$3.7 million in 2026). He next starred opposite Mukta Barve in the romantic drama Double Seat, portraying a newly married Mumbai couple as they navigate married life while working towards buying their own home. Maharashtra Times noted the maturity in Chaudhari's performance, particularly compared with his earlier college-oriented roles. His work earned him the Filmfare Award Marathi for Best Actor Critics, along with several other nominations. His final release that year was the action-crime thriller Dagadi Chawl, co-starring Pooja Sawant and Makarand Deshpande. Chaudhari played Surya, a lower-middle-class garage mechanic whose life takes a violent turn after a personal tragedy draws him into Mumbai's criminal underworld. Mihir Bhanage of The Times of India praised Chaudhari's return to action roles, noting that he "performs effortlessly throughout." The film collected ₹37 crore (equivalent to ₹61 crore or US$6.5 million in 2026) making it one of the highest-grossing Marathi films. All three of his 2015 releases ranked among the five highest-grossing Marathi films of 2015.

In 2016, following the success of Duniyadari, Chaudhari reunited with Sanjay Jadhav and Urmila Kanetkar for the romantic action film Guru. He played the titular character, a clever, street-smart conman with a kind heart who becomes a courageous protector of his community. A Pune Mirror critic described his performance as being in "top form", although finding the overall effort out of place. The film achieved moderate success but did not match the commercial impact of Duniyadari.

=== Established career (2017–2023) ===
Chaudhari starred in Zee Studios' romantic drama Ti Saddhya Kay Karte (2017), which follows two former college sweethearts who reunite years later, confront their unresolved past and part with a promise to remain friends. The film received highly positive reviews, developed cult status and became the second-highest-grossing Marathi film of the year, earning ₹22.54 crore (equivalent to ₹35 crore or US$3.7 million in 2026) worldwide. Firstpost praised Chaudhari's "appealing" voice as the narrator and observed that "the adult Anurag could have been reduced to a caricature in some scenes, but Chaudhari holds back just enough to get it right." He also received his fifth Maharashtracha Favourite Kon nomination for Favourite Actor. Later that year, he starred in Deva, in which a struggling writer travels to the Konkan region and becomes fascinated by the mysterious legend of Deva. A remake of the Malayalam film Charlie, it received largely negative reviews. The Times of India critic wrote, "Tejaswini and Ankush put in their heart in their roles but that doesn’t save the film from becoming a tedious watch." His subsequent release was the romantic comedy Triple Seat, co-starring Shivani Surve and Pallavi Patil. Although the film was poorly received, Chaudhari's performance earned him multiple nominations, including at the Filmfare Awards Marathi and Sakal Premier Awards.

In 2020, he won Filmfare Award Marathi for Best Actor for his performance in the ensemble drama Dhurala, which centres on a village election that develops into a bitter power struggle within a family. The film was both a critical and commercial success. He also starred in the family drama Luckdown Be Positive, where his chemistry with Prajakta Mali was praised. He then appeared in the comedy Lochya Zaala Re, an adaptation of the Marathi play Pati Sagle Uchapati, portraying a character caught in a hilarious chain of mistaken identities set in London. The film was commercially successful. Chaudhari also reprised his role as Surya in Daagadi Chawl 2, though the film received critical appreciation, it was only an average performer at the box office.

One of his most anticipated roles came in Kedar Shinde's biographical film Maharashtra Shahir, based on the life of renowned folk singer Krishnarao Sable. Chaudhari portrayed Sable across different stages of his life. Devendra Jadhav of Sakal described his performance as sincere and particularly praised his portrayal of Shahir in his later years, while noting that Chaudhari's body language did not always resemble Sable's. Vinod Ghatge of ABP Majha called him "the backbone of this film". Despite the favourable reviews, Maharashtra Shahir was commercially unsuccessful, grossing ₹7.60 crore (equivalent to ₹8.3 crore or US$890,000 in 2026) worldwide. He won the Fakt Marathi Cine Sanman, MaTa Sanman, Zee Chitra Gaurav Puraskar and his second Filmfare Award Marathi for Best Actor Critics for the performance. In 2023, Chaudhari reunited with Satish Rajwade for the romantic drama Autograph, which explores love, heartbreak and enduring memories. Originally scheduled for a theatrical release in December 2022, the film was eventually premiered directly on Star Pravah in May 2023. He won the International Iconic Awards Marathi for Best Actor for his performance.

=== Recent work (2025–2026) ===
After a brief absence from the screen in 2024, Chaudhari returned in 2025 with the title role in P. S. I. Arjun, a remake of the 2022 Malayalam crime thriller Kooman. The film received a poor critical response.

In 2026, he marked his return to direction after twelve years with Punha Ekda Sade Made Teen, a sequel to his earlier directorial venture Saade Maade Teen. He also co-wrote the film. The sequel received negative reviews and performed poorly at the box office. The same year, he appeared in Viju Mane's ensemble comedy Mamachya Govyala Jauya, which also failed commercially Kalpeshraj Kubal described Chaudhari's portrayal of Mama as "the soul of the film", praising his dialogue delivery and body language. He also made his digital debut in 2026 with the ZEE5 psychological crime series Devkhel. He portrayed Inspector Vishwas Saranjame, a bad-tempered and irreverent rationalist who investigates a series of mysterious annual deaths in a village and challenges the community's belief that they are divine punishments. The series and Chaudhari's performance received a positive response.

== Personal life ==
Chaudhari met actress Deepa Parab, with whom he had also studied at Maharshi Dayanand College, while performing together in the play All the Best. They dated for twelve years before marrying in a traditional Maharashtrian ceremony in November 2007. The couple has one son. Parab later established her own career as an actress in Marathi television and film.

== Other work and media image ==
Beyond film and television, Chaudhari has been a prominent performer and host at major Marathi award ceremonies. In 2014, he was ranked second on The Times of India's list of the Top 10 Hottest Men in the Marathi film industry. He has served as a brand ambassador for the menswear label #Hashtag and endorsed brands including Bagpiper Soda and Rummy Circle. Chaudhari and his wife, Deepa Parab, have also fronted a campaign promoting the education and empowerment of girls. In 2017, a wax statue depicting his Duniyadari character was displayed at wax museum in Devgad, alongside a statue of Amruta Khanvilkar. The same year, he served as a brand ambassador for the Pro Kabaddi League during its fifth season, helping promote the sport in Maharashtra. He later invested an undisclosed amount in the Marathi OTT platform Letsflix.

== Filmography ==
- All films are in Marathi, unless noted otherwise.

=== Films ===
Year	Film	Role	Notes	Ref(s)
1995	Suna Yeti Ghara	Surya		
2000	Jis Desh Mein Ganga Rehta Hain	Rahul Vashisht	Hindi film	
2000	Soon Asavi Ashi			
2000	Tuch Majhi Bhagya Lakshmi	Rajesh Patil		
2000	Tochi Ek Samrat			
2000	Laxmi			
2000	Asaj Pahije Nav Nav			
2002	Aadhaar	Mangesh Deshmukh		
2002	Pitaah	Jr. Doctor Dayal	Hindi film	
2003	Sankalp			
2004	Savarkhed Ek Gaon	Rahul Patil		
2004	Sakshatkar	Sagar		
2004	Mi Tuji Tujhich Re	Mandar		
2004	Aga Bai Arrecha!	—N/a	As assistant director	
2006	Aaila Re	Abhijeet (Abhi) Deshmukh		
2006	Matichya Chuli	Vishal Dandekar		
2006	Yanda Kartavya Aahe	Rahul		
2006	Jatra: Hyalagaad Re Tyalagaad	Himself	Special appearance in the song "Ye Go Ye Ye Maina"	
2006	Aai Shappath..!	Shekhar (Shirya)		
2006	Majha Navra Tujhi Bayko	Vijay Desai		
2007	Ishhya	Vaibhav Rane		
2007	Hyancha Kahi Nem Nahi	Motiram (Moti) Desai		
2007	Saade Maade Teen	—N/a	As director	
2008	Checkmate	Vishal Korgaonkar		
2008	Uladhaal	Vicky		
2009	Me Shivajiraje Bhosale Boltoy	Himself	Special appearance in the song "Masoli"	
2009	Gaiir	Inspector Abhijit Sardesai		
2010	Ringa Ringa	Vishwas		
2010	Irada Pakka	Himself	Special appearance in the song "Iraada Pakka"	
2010	Lalbaug Parel	Giri Dhuri (Baba)	Hindi-Marathi bilingual film	
2010	City of Gold	Giri Dhuri (Baba)	Hindi-Marathi bilingual film	
2010	Target	Anky		
2010	Chitra			
2011	Shahanpan Dega Deva	Ankush		
2011	Pratibimb	Jaysing Raje		
2011	Zhakaas	Sandy / Suhas / Subhan / Avinash	Also director and writer	
2012	Bluffmaster	Nikki		
2012	No Entry Pudhe Dhoka Aahey	Prem	Also director	
2013	Ashach Eka Betavar	Aakash		
2013	Dhating Dhingana	Rahul		
2013	Sanshay Kallol	Jai Sinha		
2013	Duniyadari	Digambar Shankar Patil	Also playback singer	
2013	Jarab	Ajay		
2013	Vanshvel	Patil		
2014	Vaadhdivsachya Haardik Shubhechcha	Subodh Kudmule		
2014	Bol Baby Bol	Himself	Special appearance	
2014	Por Bazaar	Bhurabhai		
2015	Classmates	Satya		
2015	Aabhas	Himself	Special appearance	
2015	Double Seat	Amit		
2015	Dagadi Chawl	Suryakant (Surya) Shinde		
2016	Guru	Guru Desai		
2016	Half Ticket	Himself	Special appearance	
2017	Ti Saddhya Kay Karte	Anurag (Anya) Deshpande		
2017	Deva	Deva		
2019	Rampaat	Himself	Special appearance in the song "Aaichaan Ra"	
2019	Triple Seat	Krushna Surve		
2020	Dhurala	Navnath Ubhe (Dada)		
2021	Luckdown Be Positive	Rahul		
2022	Lochya Zaala Re	Aditya Ghorpade		
2022	Daagadi Chawl 2	Suryakant (Surya) Shinde		
2023	Maharashtra Shahir	Krishnarao Sable		
2023	Autograph	Samar		
2025	P. S. I. Arjun	PSI Arjun Deshmane		
2026	Punha Ekda Sade Made Teen	—N/a	As director and writer	
2026	Mamachya Govyala Jauya	Manik Mahdvani (Mama)		

=== Television ===
Year	Show	Role	Network	Notes	Ref(s)
1997–98	Raja Aur Rancho	Inspector	DD Metro	Episodic role	
1998	Teesra Dola	Assistant detective	Doordarshan 2		
2000–01	Hasa Chakat Fu		ETV Marathi		
1999–2000	Aabhalmaya	Sunny	Alpha TV Marathi		
2002	Bedhund Manachi Lahar		Alpha TV Marathi		
2021–2024	Mi Honar Superstar	Judge	Star Pravah		
2023	Tharla Tar Mag!	Himself	Star Pravah	Special appearance	
2026	Devkhel	Inspector Vishwas Saranjame	ZEE5		

=== Theatre ===
- Maharashtrachi Lokdhara
- All the Best
- Housefull
- Gopala Re Gopala

== Accolades ==
Award	Year	Category	Work	Result	Ref(s)
Aapla Bioscope Awards	2024	Best Actor in a Lead Role	Maharashtra Shahir	Nominated	
City Cine Awards	2020	Best Actor	Triple Seat	Nominated	
Fakt Marathi Cine Sanman	2023	Best Actor Jury	Maharashtra Shahir	Won	
Fakt Marathi Cine Sanman	2023	Best Actor in a Lead Role	Maharashtra Shahir	Nominated	
Fakt Marathi Cine Sanman	2024	Best Actor in a Lead Role	Autograph	Nominated	
Filmfare Awards Marathi	2016	Best Actor	Double Seat	Nominated	
Filmfare Awards Marathi	2016	Best Actor Critics	Double Seat	Won	
Filmfare Awards Marathi	2021	Best Actor	Triple Seat	Nominated	
Filmfare Awards Marathi	2022	Best Actor	Dhurala	Won	
Filmfare Awards Marathi	2023	Best Actor	Daagadi Chawl 2	Nominated	
Filmfare Awards Marathi	2024	Best Actor	Maharashtra Shahir	Nominated	
Filmfare Awards Marathi	2024	Best Actor Critics	Maharashtra Shahir	Won	
International Iconic Awards Marathi	2024	Best Actor	Autograph	Won	
Lokmat Stylish Awards	2017	Most Stylish Actor Marathi	–	Won	
Marathi Achievers and International Awards	2016	Best Actor	Double Seat	Won	
Maharashtra State Film Awards	2004	Best Actor	Savarkhed Ek Gaon	Nominated	
Maharashtra State Film Awards	2008	Best Actor	Checkmate	Nominated	
Maharashtra State Film Awards	2015	Best Actor	Double Seat	Nominated	
MaTa Sanman	2014	Best Actor in a Supporting Role	Duniyadari	Won	
MaTa Sanman	2016	Best Actor in a Leading Role	Double Seat	Nominated	
MaTa Sanman	2022	Best Actor in a Leading Role	Dhurala	Won	
MaTa Sanman	2024	Best Actor in a Leading Role	Maharashtra Shahir	Nominated	
MaTa Sanman	2024	Best Performance (Actor)	Maharashtra Shahir	Won	
Maharashtracha Favourite Kon?	2009	Favourite Actor	Uladhaal	Nominated	
Maharashtracha Favourite Kon?	2009	Favourite Style Icon	–	Won	
Maharashtracha Favourite Kon?	2010	Favourite Style Icon	–	Won	
Maharashtracha Favourite Kon?	2010	Favourite Villain	Gaiir	Nominated	
Maharashtracha Favourite Kon?	2012	Favourite Comedian	Zhakaas	Nominated	
Maharashtracha Favourite Kon?	2012	Favourite Style Icon	–	Won	
Maharashtracha Favourite Kon?	2013	Favourite Style Icon	–	Nominated	
Maharashtracha Favourite Kon?	2013	Favourite Supporting Actor	Duniyadari	Won	
Maharashtracha Favourite Kon?	2015	Favourite Actor	Double Seat	Nominated	
Maharashtracha Favourite Kon?	2015	Favourite Actor	Classmates	Won	
Maharashtracha Favourite Kon?	2015	Favourite Style Icon	–	Won	
Maharashtracha Favourite Kon?	2016	Favourite Style Icon	–	Nominated	
Maharashtracha Favourite Kon?	2016	Favourite Actor	Dagadi Chawl	Nominated	
Maharashtracha Favourite Kon?	2017	Favourite Actor	Ti Saddhya Kay Karte	Nominated	
Maharashtracha Favourite Kon?	2017	Favourite Style Icon	–	Nominated	
Maharashtracha Favourite Kon?	2018	Favourite Style Icon	–	Nominated	
Maharashtracha Favourite Kon?	2019	Favourite Actor	Triple Seat	Nominated	
Maharashtracha Favourite Kon?	2019	Favourite Style Icon	–	Won	
Maharashtracha Favourite Kon?	2021	Favourite Actor	Classmates	Nominated	
Maharashtracha Favourite Kon?	2021	Favourite Supporting Actor	Duniyadari	Won	
Maharashtracha Favourite Kon?	2021	Favourite Style Icon	–	Nominated	
Maharashtracha Favourite Kon?	2023	Favourite Style Icon	–	Nominated	
Maharashtracha Favourite Kon?	2024	Favourite Style Icon	–	Nominated	
Maharashtracha Favourite Kon?	2024	Favourite Actor	Maharashtra Shahir	Nominated	
Sakal Premier Awards	2019	Best Actor	Triple Seat	Nominated	
Sakal Premier Awards	2024	Best Actor	Maharashtra Shahir	Won	
Sanskruti Kaladarpan	2017	Best Actor	Double Seat	Won	
Sanskruti Kaladarpan	2024	Best Actor	Maharashtra Shahir	Nominated	
Sanskruti Kaladarpan	2024	Best Actor	Autograph	Nominated	
Shahir Dada Kondke Awards	2018	Overall Contribution in Marathi cinema	–	Honoured	
Zee Chitra Gaurav Puraskar	2002	Best Actor	Aadhaar	Nominated	
Zee Chitra Gaurav Puraskar	2004	Best Actor	Savarkhed Ek Gaon	Nominated	
Zee Chitra Gaurav Puraskar	2006	Best Supporting Actor	Aai Shappath..!	Nominated	
Zee Chitra Gaurav Puraskar	2015	Best Actor	Por Bazaar	Nominated	
Zee Chitra Gaurav Puraskar	2016	Best Actor	Double Seat	Nominated	
Zee Chitra Gaurav Puraskar	2024	Special Outstanding Performance	Maharashtra Shahir	Won	
