= Mamachya Govyala Jauya =

- Directed by: Viju Mane
- Written by: Viju Mane; Rahul Awate; Kushal Badrike
- Produced by: Viju Mane
- Starring: Ankush Chaudhari; Santosh Juvekar; Abhijeet Chavan; Kushal Badrike
- Cinematography: Shabbir Naik
- Edited by: Jayant Jathar
- Music by: Avadhoot Gupte
- Production companies: Vijumania (OPC) Pvt. Ltd.; Light & Shed
- Release date: 31 July 2026
- Running time: 122 minutes
- Country: India
- Language: Marathi

Mamachya Govyala Jauya (transl. Let’s Go to Uncle’s Goa) is a 2026 Indian Marathi-language comedy film written, produced and directed by Viju Mane. The film stars Ankush Chaudhari, Santosh Juvekar, Abhijeet Chavan and Kushal Badrike in the lead roles, with Vidula Chougule, Neha Khan and Ruchira Jadhav in supporting roles. It was released theatrically in India on 31 July 2026.

The film continues the characters Santya, Baba and Kushya from Mane's web series Struggler Saala, following three struggling actors whose free trip to Goa descends into chaos. It was released theatrically on 31 July 2026, timed to coincide with the week of Friendship Day.

== Plot ==
Three struggling friends get the chance to go on a free trip to Goa, dreaming of a few days of fun and memorable experiences. With an extra ticket available, they invite an old college friend to join them, only to discover that he has brought along an unexpected companion. What begins as a planned getaway gradually turns into a series of mishaps and unexpected situations as their plans repeatedly go wrong.

== Cast ==
- Ankush Chaudhari as Mama
- Santosh Juvekar as Santya
- Abhijeet Chavan as Baba
- Kushal Badrike as Kushya
- Makarand Deshpande as Pablo
- Vidula Chougule as Katrina
- Neha Khan as Tamanna
- Ruchira Jadhav as Alia
- Abir Surve as Bunty
- Yogesh Shirsat as Robert
- Amir Tadwalkar as Gelato
- Pravin Tarde as a police inspector
- Viju Mane
- Mahesh Manjrekar
- Avadhoot Gupte
- Sanjay Jadhav
- Sachin Goswami

== Production ==
The film was written, directed and produced by Viju Mane. Rahul Awate and Kushal Badrike are also credited as writers. Shabbir Naik served as cinematographer, Jayant Jathar as editor, and Avadhoot Gupte as music composer.

The film was announced as a Viju Mane directorial project centred on friendship and a trip to Goa. The principal cast included Kushal Badrike, Abhijeet Chavan and Santosh Juvekar, with Ankush Chaudhari subsequently joining the cast.

== Release ==
Mamachya Govyala Jauya was released theatrically in India on 31 July 2026.

== Reception ==
The film received reviews following its theatrical release. Film Information published a review of the film on 31 July 2026 and discussed the performances of the principal cast.
