= Tula Kalnnaar Nahi =

2017 Marathi language film by Swapna Waghmare Joshi

Tula Kalannar Nahi
- Theatrical release poster
- Directed by: Swapna Waghmare-Joshi
- Written by: Sameer Arora; Shirish Latkar
- Produced by: Arjun Singgh Baran; Kartk D Nishandar; Swwapnil Joshi; Shreea Yogesh Kadam
- Starring: Sonalee Kulkarni; Subodh Bhave; Sushant Shelar; Neeta Shetty
- Cinematography: Prasad Bhende; Sandeep Dhumal
- Edited by: Kshitija Khandagale
- Music by: Amitraj; Nilesh Mohariar
- Production companies: GSEAMS; Saksham Filmz; Cinekorn Entertainment
- Release date: 8 September 2017
- Running time: 112 minutes
- Country: India
- Language: Marathi

Tula Kalnnaar Nahi (transl. You Won't Know) is a 2017 Marathi-language film directed by Swapna Waghmare Joshi. Scripted by Sameer Arora, the film is produced by Saksham Filmz, GSEAMS and Cinekorn Entertainment. Starring Sonalee Kulkarni, Subodh Bhave, Neetha Shetty, Sushant Shelar, Rasika Dhabadgaokar, Sangram Salvi and Uday Tikekar in guest appearances, it was the first time that Sonalee Kulkarni and Subodh Bhave worked together as a lead pair in a film.

The story of the film revolves around love and hate relationship of husband and wife, Anjali and Rahul played by the lead pair. The film was theatrically released on 8 September 2017.

== Cast ==
- Sonalee Kulkarni as Anjali
- Subodh Bhave as Rahul
- Sushant Shelar as Sachin
- Neetha Shetty as Menaka
- Uday Tikekar as Anjali's Father
- Rasika Sunil as Nandini
- Sanghram Salvi As Shekhar aka Babdu

== Plot ==
Rahul And Anjali are a married couple. There nothing is nothing good happening between them. Suddenly Anjali files a divorce case stating that he is not taking a proper care of her and is more into his job in a construction company and he only spends time in it and not on her. Rahul gets a diary from a cupboard from a building which catches fire. He develops more strong hatredness for relationship that wife's usually spoil their life. And decides to travel to Goa to return the diary to Nandini to let her know of her lover Bagdu (or Shekhar) who has written the diary. On the way he finds a vehicle on the road and the driver asking for lift and he agrees to give so but after looking at the person whom he has to give the lift (his wife) he refuses to give her lift then they are made convinced to travel together to Goa. Rahul hands over the divorce papers to her after signing it and then they decided to go on their own way. But his Friend (Sachin) sets up a girl with him for a one-night stand which Rahul is not aware of goes to pick up Menaka who has been sent by his friend Sachin. But his wife watches her and decided to travel together with them till Mumbai. So she begins inquiring about Menaka. And he explains that she is a relative of Sachin's friend. But on the way to Nagpur while they were refilling fuel in the vehicle. They encounter the relatives of Anjali and are taken to their village where her parents are not talking to each other and his father doesn't want to have her as her daughter because she opted for photography when she was given an option of photography or house. They have a good welcome as couples by the mother-in-law of Rahul or mother of Anjali. They stay that day and the next day they decide to leave. But the day before in the night when Anjali's father is upset about her, he makes him understand that she is storing memories forever. And it's not a small job in society. The next morning they leave for Nagpur where they are stopped again. And Anjali's father showers flowers on her and gives her well wishes and tells that -"You left this house that was your biggest mistake but your choice of husband is unmatchable". They finally leave for Nagpur. They decide to go via Nagpur as Nandini had shifted to Nagpur two years ago. And when they reach Nagpur they get to know that she is living in Mumbai near their house. So they start their journey towards Mumbai. But they go to another city to complete the love story of Menaka who is unsuccessful in having a one-night stand. And also Sachin also asked not to have it and come back. But Anjali finds letters in Menaka's purse which she has written to her lover. Later when Rahul and Anjali reunite Menaka and his Lover. Before leaving she tells to Anjali that - "don't leave him ever". Then after reaching Mumbai in the Night they have discussion or argument regarding handing over of diary may effect feelings of Nandini. The next morning they Handover the diary and find that Bagdu is alive. That day later in the night they talk with actions and realize the love and bond between them and their divorce is not a right decision and it may spoil it. But they don't say to each other they sit for eating and Anjali gets call from her Father and he praises Rahul for making him realize of Anjali's Talents. So just like the Doctor say Anjali tells Rahul Thanks. Then she gets a call from mother as usual. She reminds to do things she tends to forget. Then Rahul asks why don't you talk to my mother so she tells I always talk to your mother. So he tells Thanks. To next day they go on a new journey cancelling their divorce. Telling each other Sorry.

== Soundtrack ==
Tula Kalnnaar Nahi

Soundtrack album by Amitraj, Nilesh Moharir
- Released: 28 August 2017
- Recorded: 2017
- Genre: Feature film soundtrack
- Length: 13:39
- Language: Marathi
- Label: Zee Music Company

Amitraj chronology
Deva (2017)	Tula Kalnnaar Nahi (2017)	Party (2018)
External audio
- Audio Jukebox on YouTube

The songs for the film are composed by Nilesh Moharir and Amitraj and lyrics by Kshitij Patwardhan, Ashwini Shende.

Track list
No.	Title	Lyrics	Music	Singer(s)	Length
1.	"Tula Kalnnaar Nahi"	Kshitij Patwardhan	Amitraj	Neha Rajpal, Swapnil Bandodkar	4:45
2.	"Mithit Ye"	Ashwini Shende	Nilesh Moharir	Janvee Prabhu Arora	4:30
3.	"Majha Moshil Ka"	Ashwini Shende	Nilesh Moharir	Nihira Joshi Deshpande, Swapnil Bandodkar	4:24
Total length:					13:39

== Release ==
The official trailer was released by Rajshri Marathi on 29 August 2017.

The film was theatrically released on 8 September 2017.
