= Ringa Ringa =

2010 Indian film by Sanjay Jadhav

- Directed by: Sanjay Jadhav
- Written by: Amol Shetge
- Produced by: Kanchan Satpute; Suresh Pai
- Starring: Sonali Kulkarni; Ajinkya Deo; Bharat Jadhav; Ankush Chaudhari; Aditi Govitrikar
- Cinematography: Sanjay Jadhav
- Edited by: Amit Pawar
- Music by: Ajay-Atul
- Production company: Nishant Audio Visuals Pvt. Ltd.
- Release date: 19 February 2010
- Running time: 106 minutes
- Country: India
- Language: Marathi

Ringa Ringa (Marathi : रिंगा रिंगा) is a 2010 Indian Marathi-language film directed and written by Sanjay Jadhav which released in theatres on 19 February 2010. The music was composed by Ajay-Atul.

Starring Sonali Kulkarni and Ajinkya Deo, Ankush Chaudhari in the lead roles, it also stars Bharat Jadhav, Aditi Govitrikar, Santosh Juvekar, Kamlesh Sawant and others.

== Plot ==
Shrirang Nayak aka Rangarao (Ajinkya Deo) is almost the top leader in Goa, but things get messy when his security guy, Siddharth (Bharat Jadhav), tells the ex-leader about some terrorist connection. The ex-leader, Annasaheb Marathe (Uday Sabnis), tells him to prove it. Siddharth collects proof, but Rangarao sends Johnny (Santosh Juvekar) to get rid of him. Before he goes, Siddharth tells his wife, Mansi (Sonali Kulkarni), about the secret proof.

After Siddharth is gone, Mansi is really sad and starts thinking he's still alive. Rangarao wants to hide the proof, so he tells Vishwas (Ankush Chaudhari) and Johnny to watch Mansi. They need to get that evidence Siddharth left behind. The story gets more complicated as everyone tries to find the truth and win in this political game.

== Cast ==
- Sonali Kulkarni as Mansi Nayak
- Ajinkya Deo as Shrirang Nayak aka Rangarao
- Ankush Chaudhari as Vishwas
- Bharat Jadhav as Siddharth
- Santosh Juvekar as Johnny
- Aditi Govitrikar as Dream Girl
- Uday Sabnis as Chief Minister Annasaheb Marathe
- Kamlesh Sawant as Goa Inspector
- Jayant Savarkar as Mansi's father
- Sanjay Mone as Dr. Shahbagh
- Chandrakant Kanse as Anthony
