= Vrundavan =

2016 Marathi film directed by T.L.V Prasad

- Film poster
- Directed by: T. L. V. Prasad
- Produced by: Sandeep Sharma
- Starring: Raqesh Bapat; Vaidehi Parashurami; Pooja Sawant
- Edited by: Hardik Singh Reen
- Music by: Amitraj
- Release date: 8 April 2016
- Country: India
- Language: Marathi
- Box office: ₹4.2 crore (US$440,000)

Vrundavan is a 2016 Indian Marathi-language film, directed by T. L. V Prasad. It is official remake of Telugu film Brindavanam (2010).

== Plot ==
Krish is the son of a multimillionaire. He has a love interest in Pooja, who has a friend Bhumi. Bhumi's father Bhanupratap Inamdar wants to get her married to her cousin Kalyan, who is a rowdy goon, which Bhumi doesn't like. Naturally, Girdhar Inamdar her paternal grandfather bluffs to the family that she has already fallen in love with a guy in the city. Pooja helps her by renting Krish as her would-be, just to let her escape the wedding situation for the time being. He goes to the village intending to prevent the marriage using tricks. He ends up solving many problems in the village and finally putting an end to the rivalry between Bhanupratap and Bhumi's uncle, leading to a happy ending.

== Cast ==
- Raqesh Bapat as Krish
- Pooja Sawant as Pooja
- Vaidehi Parashurami as Bhumi Inamdar
- Mahesh Manjrekar as Bhanupratap Inamdar (Bhumi's father)
- Sharad Ponkshe as Bhumi's uncle
- Ashok Saraf as Girdhar Inamdar (Bhumi's grandfather)
- Sameer Deshpande as Kalyan
- Bharat Ganeshpure as Daily Kumar
- Uday Tikekar
- Mohan Joshi
- Kumar Hegde
- Aarti Solanki

== Soundtrack ==
Vrundavan

Soundtrack album by Amitraj
- Released: 2016
- Genre: Film soundtrack
- Language: Marathi
- Label: Zee Music Company

Vrundavan's songs were composed by Amitraj and lyrics by Mandar Cholkar. The four-song album featured vocals by Harshavardhan Wavare, Avadhoot Gupte, Kasturi Wavare.

No.	Title	Lyrics	Singer(s)	Length
1.	"Raga Raga"	Mandar Cholkar	Harshavardhan Wavare, Kasturi Wavare	03:17
2.	"Aaj Premachi"	Mandar Cholkar	Harshavardhan Wavare	03:35
3.	"Dashing Govinda"	Mandar Cholkar	Avadhoot Gupte	03:53
4.	"Mana Vede"	Mandar Cholkar	Harshavardhan Wavare	05:04
Total length:				15:49

== Reception ==
Mihir Bhanage from The Times of India stated: "Till last year, remakes of South films were almost unheard of in the Marathi film industry but the trend which was predominantly Bollywood's so far, has caught up with Marathi filmmakers too. Vrundavan, the remake of the Telugu Brindavanam, is the latest to join the bandwagon." He gave 2.0 points out of 5.

Ganesh Matkari of Pune Mirror described the film as "Good Acting Talent" and "Average film".
