= Luckee =

- Official poster
- Directed by: Sanjay Jadhav
- Produced by: Sanjay Kukreja; Suraj Singh; Deepak Pandurang Rane
- Starring: Abhay Mahajan; Deepti Sati; Mayur More; Shubhangi Tamble; Mehul Jangli; Kamesh; Sanika Ghaises; Rutuja Kulkarni
- Cinematography: Vijay Soni
- Edited by: Apurva Motiwale
- Music by: Amitraj; Pankajj Padghan
- Release date: 7 February 2019
- Country: India
- Language: Marathi

Luckee is a 2019 Indian Marathi-language romantic comedy film directed by Sanjay Jadhav. It stars Abhay Mahajan and Deepti Sati in lead roles. It is being produced by Sanjay Kukreja & Suraj Singh's Blive Productions & Music and Deepak Pandurang Rane's Dreaming 24/7 entertainment. It is confirmed for release on 7 February 2019.

This film revolving around four friends is set to make you jump on your feet with laughter, push you back with a little 'aww' for our lead Luckee.

== Plot ==
A 21-year-old comes from a humble background and is ironically named Luckee. He indeed is Luckee but mind you, he is Lucky for people around him. Very naturally, despite being friends with a majority of the girls in his college, he can't get ahead, "the friend-zoned for life" tag! He has a crush on Jiya and continues to hunt for chances to impress his lady-love. But, life is never too easy for Luckee. Amidst Luckee's daily struggles to woo her, college announces its annual trip. On the tour group, there is Jiya, Luckee's love interest. What happens during the college's annual trip forms the crux of the story.

== Cast ==
- Abhay Mahajan as Luckee
- Deepti Sati as Jiya
- Mayur More as Sanket
- Shubhangi Tamble as Shruti
- Mehul Jangli as Gaurav
- Kamesh as Nikhil
- Sanika Ghaises as Prachi
- Rutuja Kulkarni as Rutuja

== Production ==
Principal photography on the film began in September 2017 and wrapped up in April 2018. It is confirmed for release on 7 February 2019.

== Marketing and release ==
The first look official poster of the film released on 3 July 2018 and announced a release date of 7 December 2018. Which later got changed to 7 February 2019.

Two new theatrical posters revealing looks of lead actors of the film unveiled for the public on 9 and 15 January 2019. The Trailer Announcement was made on 14 January 2019. The official trailer of the film was released on 16 January 2019.

== Soundtrack ==
Track listing
No.	Title	Lyrics	Music	Singer(s)	Length
1.	"Introducing Lucky Star Cast"	Sachin Pathak	Pankajj Padghan	Amitraj, Sayali Pankaj, Rohit Raut	1:25
2.	"Kopcha"	Sachin Pathak	Amitraj	Bappi Lahiri, Vaishali Samant	3:15
3.	"Majhya Dila Cho"	Sachin Pathak	Pankajj Padghan	Chaitanya Devadhe	3:32
4.	"Jile Jara"	Sachin Pathak	Pankajj Padghan	Shalmali Kholgade	3:21
5.	"Luckee (Title song)"	Sachin Pathak	Amitraj	Amitraj	3:23
