= Guru (2016 film) =

- Theatrical release poster
- Directed by: Sanjay Jadhav
- Written by: Aashish Pathre
- Produced by: Sunil Lulla; Deepak Pandurang Rane
- Starring: Ankush Choudhary; Urmila Kanitkar; Murali Sharma
- Cinematography: Vijay Soni
- Edited by: Apurva Motiwale; Ashish Mhatre
- Music by: Amitraj; Pankaj Padghan
- Production companies: Eros International; Bagpiper Soda; Dreaming Twenty Four Seven Entertainment
- Distributed by: Eros International
- Release date: 22 January 2016
- Running time: 142 minutes
- Country: India
- Language: Marathi

Guru is a 2016 Indian Marathi-language action film directed by Sanjay Jadhav and produced by Sunil Lulla, Deepak Pandurang Rane and Bagpiper Soda. The film stars Ankush Choudhary and Urmila Kanitkar in lead roles. Film marks the fourth collaboration of actor-director duo Ankush Choudhary and Sanjay Jadhav and first after their blockbuster outing Duniyadari. The film released on 22 January 2016.

Official teaser of the film is released on 18 November 2015. First official poster of the film designed by Sachin Gurav was unveiled in an event while official trailer went online on 30 December.

== Plot ==
Guru – A young and smart smalltime conman, earns his livelihood by manipulating rich people but is also the king of hearts in his neighborhood. However, one fine day, he happens to witness a murder and get trapped in scandal, Guru returns to his village to get away from the scandal. The villagers of his native place are under the threat of being forcefully evicted to make way for a 'Mega City' being planned on their land. A local advocate, along with Guru's brother, vehemently oppose this project and firmly stand in the way of it. The murder he witnessed is part of a larger conspiracy which follows him and has connection with his village which threatens to endanger him, as well as his loved ones. With his brother seriously injured and his newfound sweetheart in considerable danger, how guru overcomes this situations forms rest of the story.

== Cast ==
- Ankush Choudhary as Guru Desai
- Urmilla Kothare as Mango Dolly aka Ovi
- Murali Sharma as Mansingh
- Avinash Narkar as Madhav Desai
- Ravindra Mankani
- Sneha Raikar
- Jyoti Chandekar
- Vicky Mokal
- Chandrakant Yadav as Nagesh

== Soundtrack ==
Guru

Soundtrack album by Amitraj, Pankaj Padghan, Praful Karlekar
- Released: 13 January 2016
- Genre: Feature film soundtrack
- Length: 14:17
- Label: Eros Music
- Directors: Amitraj, Pankaj Padghan & Praful Karlekar

Amitraj, Pankaj Padghan, Praful Karlekar chronology
Friends (2016)	Guru (2016)	Bandh Nylon Che (2016)

Amitraj, Pankaj Padghan and Praful Karlekar composed the music for this film. Kshitij Patwardhan, Mandar Cholkar, Sachin Pathak wrote lyrics for the film. Title song from the movie composed by Amitraj written by Sachin Pathak and sung by Adarsh Shinde was released on 22 December 2015.

Track listing
No.	Title	Artist(s)	Length
1.	"Guru"	Adarsh Shinde	4:17
2.	"Filmy Filmy"	Vijay Prakash	3:21
3.	"Mango Dolly"	Sagar Phadke, Sayali Pankaj	2:36
4.	"Ata Ladhayche"	Adarsh Shinde, Avadhoot Gupte, Nandesh Umap, Amol Bavdekar, Kirti Killedar, Swapnil Godbole	4:43
Total length:			14:17

== Release and reception ==
Film had a theatrical release on 22 January 2016. ABP Majha gave 3.5/5 and india.com gave 4/5 rating in the review.
