= Lapachhapi =

2017 Marathi horror film by Vishal Furia

- Theatrical release poster
- Directed by: Vishal Furia
- Written by: Vishal Furia; Vishal Kapoor
- Screenplay by: Vishal Kapoor
- Story by: Vishal Furia
- Produced by: Jitendra Patil
- Starring: Pooja Sawant; Usha Naik; Vikram Gaikwad
- Cinematography: Chandan Kowli
- Production company: A Midas Touch Movies
- Release date: 14 July 2017 (India)
- Running time: 118 minutes
- Country: India
- Language: Marathi

Lapachhapi (transl. Hide and Seek) is a 2017 Marathi horror film directed by Vishal Furia and produced by Jitendra Patil.

== Synopsis ==
The film opens with a heavily pregnant woman running away to escape an unseen force which appears to be chasing her. However, the force soon catches up with her and forces her to stab herself.

Introduced to the viewers are a young couple, Tushar (Vikram Gaikwad) and 8-month-pregnant Neha (Pooja Sawant) who undertake a trip to a remote village to escape vengeful debtors. They accommodate themselves in a ramshackle house in the midst of a thick sugarcane field, owned by an aged couple Bhaurao (Anil Gawas) and Tulsabai (Usha Naik). Initially, all appears well in the tranquil village, but soon the dark secrets of the family inhabiting the house begin to surface. Tulsa berates and torments her daughter-in-law Lakshmi, always casting disparaging remarks after her. She tells Neha the story of her younger brother-in-law's wife Kaveri, who murdered her own husband and her brothers-in-law (who are still children) in cold blood.

Neha sees visions of the three children and hears the voice of a woman from a tape recorder the children play with. She suspects the woman to be the dead daughter-in-law Kaveri. The visions grow stronger with passing time and in time, reveal the truth to her: Kaveri accidentally stabbed her husband in a scuffle. Tulsabai witnessed the stabbing, and instigated the other villagers to burn her alive. Kaveri's malevolent spirit haunted the house, driving the pregnant women who lived there mad and forcing them to stab themselves.

It is revealed that Bhaurao and Tulsa regularly practice female infanticide, and kill the daughter-in-laws who bear female children. The newborn female babies are then drowned by the couple's son Pratap Rao (who masquerades as Tushar), in accordance with a misguided superstition that calls for human sacrifice to ensure a bountiful harvest. Pratap Rao attempts to kill Neha as well, but is lynched by the spirits of the children who appear in a corporeal form. Neha leaves the home in disgust, and sees a vision of the children, who guide her out of the maze-like sugarcane fields, whereupon she leaves the village, never to return again.

== Cast ==
- Pooja Sawant as Neha
- Usha Naik as Tulsabai
- Vikram Gaikwad as Tushar
- Anil Gawas as Bhaurao
- Hridaynath Rane
- Aparna Ambawane
- Dhanashree Khandkar

== Production ==
This was a directorial debut for Furia. Before the official release on July 14, the movie was premiered in various film festivals around the world. Furia started with the script writing process in 2013 and finished in 2014. Furia said it took him almost a year to find a producer.

== Soundtrack ==
The movie soundtrack had only 2 songs and was released by Zee music in July, 2017. Music was produced by Utkarsh Dhotekar, Tony Deori Basumatary, Shreyas Puranik, and Ranjan Patnaik. Ek Khel Lapachhapi cha (lullaby), written by Swayeshree Shashin, was originally sung by Nandini Borkar, but later recorded by Rekha Bhardwaj. Vaishali Samant sang the other song, Dil Khulas.

== Critical reception ==
The film has received generally positive reviews from critics, who praised the movie for a refreshing take on oft-ignored Indian horror genre. Pooja Sawant and Usha Naik's performances were received positively. Ullhas Shirke of Marathi Movie World called it a horror filled film with the game of illusions. He commended it as a technically well made film that "will surely impress horror film lovers." Mihir Bhanage of The Times of India, rated it 3.5 on a scale of 5, calling it "by far the best Marathi horror film till date" and "something that can be looked at as a beginning for Marathi filmmakers to explore this relatively untapped genre". Mansi Dutta writing for Flickside listed it among the handful of films that thwart genre's poor perception, and praised the director for "eerie" location choices. Ganesh Matkari of Pune Mirror gave it full marks for effort even though " the film has its share of problems and loses its way intermitte". Abhay Salvi writing for MarathiStars.com, wrote that Lapachhapi is a convincing horror movie that could have been much better. A review in Divya Marathi called it a great combination of horror and thriller elements.

== Awards ==
Lapachhapi won the following awards:

- Brooklyn Film Festival 2016 - Official Selection
  - Winner - Spirit Award
- Madrid International Film Festival 2016 - Official Selection
  - Winner - Best New Director
  - Nominations - Best Actress, Best Supporting Actress, Best Original Score, Best Editing
- Spotlight Horror Awards - Gold Award Winner
- Horror Hotel Film Festival, Ohio
  - Official Selection, 4th place Winner
- Indiefest Film Awards 2016
  - Awards of Merit (Special Mention) - Cinematography
- Accolade Global Film Competition Awards 2016
  - Awards of Excellence - Feature Film, Direction, Cinematography, Story/Writing, Original Score, Dramatic Impact

== See also ==
- Chhorii (the Hindi-language remake, also directed by Vishal Furia)
