= Vanshvel =

- Official poster
- Directed by: Rajiv Patil
- Written by: Datta Patil
- Produced by: Sunil Mankar
- Starring: Ankush Chaudhari; Kishor Kadam; Namrata Gaikwad; Sushant Shelar
- Music by: Amitraj
- Release date: 18 October 2013
- Country: India
- Language: Marathi

Vanshvel is a 2013 Marathi language film directed by Rajiv Patil, produced by Sunil Mankar. The film starring Ankush Chaudhari, Kishor Kadam, Namrata Gaikwad, Sushant Shelar, Shantanu Gangane, Manisha Kelkar and Vidya Karanjikar. The film was released on 18 October 2013.

== Cast ==
- Ankush Chaudhari as inspector Vikram Raje
- Kishor Kadam as Dadasaheb
- Namrata Gaikwad as Sayali
- Sushant Shelar as Nilesh
- Shantanu Gangane as Anil
- Manisha Kelkar as Priyanka
- Vidya Karanjikar as Mai
- Usha Naik
- Kranti Redkar as herself (special appearance in song "Ambe Krupa Kari")
- Smita Tambe as herself (special appearance in song "Ambe Krupa Kari")
- Sonali Khare as herself (special appearance in song "Ambe Krupa Kari")
- Purva Pawar as herself (special appearance in song "Ambe Krupa Kari")
- Amruta Khanvilkar as herself (special appearance in song "Ambe Krupa Kari")
- Smita Shewale as herself (special appearance in song "Ambe Krupa Kari")
- Megha Ghadge as herself (special appearance in song "Ambe Krupa Kari")
- Neha Pendse as herself (special appearance in song "Ambe Krupa Kari")
- Deepali Sayed as herself (special appearance in song "Ambe Krupa Kari")
- Pooja Sawant as herself (special appearance in song "Ambe Krupa Kari")
- Teja Devkar as herself (special appearance in song "Ambe Krupa Kari")
- Siya Patil as herself (special appearance in song "Ambe Krupa Kari")
- Samidha Guru as herself (special appearance in song "Ambe Krupa Kari")
- Sai Lokur as herself (special appearance in song "Ambe Krupa Kari")

== Reception ==
Saumitra Pote from Maharashtra Times opined, "On the whole, the movie is riveting because of the shock techniques in the movie. But, in social films like 'Jogwa', 'Pangira' and even the recent '72 Mile Ek Pravas', the director expressed his clear views without any pretense. In comparison, 'Vanshvel' is shaky". A critic of Divya Marathi wrote "Director Rajeev Patil has succeeded in presenting a disturbing x-ray of the social issue of female infanticide and the race's need for light. Not only this, it is always better to go and watch 'Vanshvel' in the theaters, which comments on husband-wife relationship, family system, equality between men and women". Rajesh from Prahaar stated "Since it is directed by Rajeev, every small and big thing has been carefully thought out. There is no name anywhere in it. This movie is a must watch for his direction."
