= P. S. I. Arjun =

2025 Indian action thriller film

- Directed by: Bhushan Patel
- Written by: Sandip Dandawate
- Produced by: Vikram Shankar; Dhruv Das
- Starring: Ankush Chaudhari
- Cinematography: Shakil Khan; Vasudeo Rane
- Edited by: Mansoor Azmi
- Production companies: Vistromax Sports & Entertainment; Dreamweaver Entertainment
- Distributed by: Cinépolis India
- Release date: 9 May 2025
- Running time: 138 minutes
- Country: India
- Language: Marathi

P.S.I. Arjun is a 2025 Indian Marathi language action thriller film directed by Bhushan Patel and starring Ankush Chaudhari in the titular role. The film is a remake of the 2022 Malayalam crime thriller Kooman, directed by Jeethu Joseph and starring Asif Ali. The film follows PSI Arjun Deshmane, a dashing but temperamental police officer who gets involved in solving a series of mysterious murders while dealing with his own psychological issues.

The film was released theatrically on 9 May 2025, and distributed by Cinépolis India. It was both a critical and commercial failure.

== Plot ==
PSI Arjun Deshmane is a skilled yet short-tempered police officer stationed at a rural police station. Though known for his sharp investigative mind and keen observation, his uncontrollable anger often drives him to extremes, especially when provoked or humiliated. His aggressive nature frequently causes friction with colleagues and superiors alike. The tension intensifies when Arjun gets his new Police Inspector, Rajesh Patil, suspended after a heated altercation, an act that exposes Arjun's impulsive and vindictive tendencies. This incident cements his reputation as an officer who bends the rules and uses his authority to settle personal grudges, further alienating him within the department.

The story takes a gripping turn when Arjun encounters a murder case during his routine duties. As the investigation unfolds, more killings emerge, each executed in an identical, methodical manner, suggesting the presence of a serial killer. The precision and pattern behind the murders hint at a calculated, possibly ritualistic motive, pushing Arjun to explore the psychological depth of the crimes. Determined to uncover the truth, Arjun discovers that the murders are interconnected not just by their execution but also by a hidden pattern in the victims’ backgrounds. As he pieces the puzzle together, the case becomes deeply personal. Arjun's own rage and thirst for vengeance start mirroring the mindset of the killer he's chasing, forcing him to confront the darker aspects of his own psyche.

The investigation grows increasingly intense, testing Arjun's ethics and self-control. His greatest strength, his obsession with justice, becomes both his driving force and his downfall. Arjun finally comes face-to-face with the serial killer in a tense confrontation where the boundaries between law enforcer and lawbreaker blur. Using his instincts and relentless pursuit of the truth, he manages to expose the murderer and bring the case to a close. Yet, the ending leaves behind unsettling questions about morality, vengeance, and the psychological cost of policing—raising the haunting thought of whether Arjun's own demons make him any different from the criminal he hunted.

== Cast ==
- Ankush Chaudhari as PSI Arjun Deshmane
- Akshaya Hindalkar as Shraddha
- Kishore Kadam as Chhabya
- Nandu Madhav as PI Vinayak Rane
- Rajendra Shisatkar as PI Rajesh Patil
- Dnyanesh Wadekar as Durga Swami
- Kamlakar Satpute as API Padmakar More
- Shekhar Phadke as PSI Kawale
- Francis Augustine as Kisanrao
- Omprakash Shinde as Baban
- Prajakta Navnale as Constable
- Bhagyeesh Salunke as Durgaswami Sishya
- Makarand Sawant as Constable Patil
- Nitin Dhanduke as Shraddha's father
- Vandana Wakhnis as Shraddha's mother
- Vimal Mhatre as Arjun's mother

== Soundtrack ==
The film's music was composed by Aniruddh Nimkar, with lyrics penned by Jaydeep Marathe, while the background score was created by Sunil Singh. The soundtrack features a single song.

== Release ==
The teaser introduced Ankush Chaudhari in a commanding police officer avatar. The official trailer, released on 2 May 2025, highlighted Arjun's impactful line, "थांब म्हटलं की थांबायचं" ("When I say stop, you must stop"), which became a central promotional tagline. For the trailer launch event, the fictional Navapur Police Station set was recreated, and Chaudhari made a dramatic entry wearing handcuffs.
