= Devkhel =

Indian psychological crime thriller series

- Genre: Psychological thriller; Crime; Mystery
- Written by: Chandrakant Lata Gaikwad; Nikhil Ashok Palande
- Directed by: Chandrakant Lata Gaikwad
- Starring: Ankush Chaudhari; Prajakta Mali; Yatin Karyekar; Arun Nalawade; Mangesh Desai; Veena Jamkar
- Country of origin: India
- Original language: Marathi
- No. of episodes: 7

Production
- Producer: Cine Masters Production Pvt Ltd

Original release
- Network: ZEE5
- Release: 30 January 2026

Devkhel is a 2026 Indian Marathi-language psychological crime thriller series which premiered on the OTT platform ZEE5 on 30 January 2026. Directed by Chandrakant Lata Gaikwad, the series is inspired by the regional folklore of the Konkan region and explores the intersection of traditional superstition and modern criminal investigation.

== Synopsis ==
The narrative is set in the fictional coastal village of Devtali in the Ratnagiri district of Maharashtra. The story follows a chilling recurring pattern: every year, on the night of Holi Pournima (during the Shimga festival), a villager dies under mysterious circumstances.

The local community attributes these deaths to Shankasur, a mythical folk figure worshipped as a divine enforcer of justice. According to local belief, these deaths are divine punishments rather than crimes. The series centers on Inspector Vishwas Saranjame, a rationalist law enforcement officer who arrives in the village to investigate the latest death. Saranjame attempts to debunk the supernatural explanations and uncover the human hand behind the serial killings, leading to a central conflict between faith and reason.

== Cast ==
- Ankush Chaudhari as Inspector Vishwas Saranjame
- Prajakta Mali as Sarika Nimkar
- Yatin Karyekar as Vishwanath Nimkar
- Arun Nalawade as Balkrushna Saranjme
- Mangesh Desai as SP Rangane
- Veena Jamkar as Lakshmi

== Production ==
=== Release ===
The official trailer was unveiled by ZEE5 on January 23, 2026. The series premiered on the platform on January 30, 2026.

=== Reception ===
Devkhel received mixed reviews from critics following its release.

Writing for Scroll.in, the reviewer noted that while the series is built around an intriguing premise, much of the narrative follows a predictable trajectory. The review highlighted Ankush Chaudhari's performance as Inspector Vishwas Saranjame as a key strength, describing him as a disruptive and engaging presence within an otherwise formulaic plot.

A review by OTTplay rated the series 3 out of 5 stars, stating that although Devkhel shows promise through its themes and performances, it struggles with uneven pacing and familiar tropes. The review observed that several moments with emotional and dramatic potential are undercut by conventional storytelling, resulting in an overall mixed viewing experience.
