= Daagadi Chawl 2 =

- Theatrical release poster
- Directed by: Chandrakant Kanse
- Written by: Sanjay Jamkhandi (Dialogues)
- Screenplay by: Machchindra Bugade; Chandrakant Kanse
- Story by: Machchindra Bugade
- Produced by: Sangeeta Ahir
- Starring: Ankush Chaudhari; Makarand Deshpande; Pooja Sawant
- Cinematography: Vasudeo Rane
- Edited by: Faisal Mahadik; Imran Mahadik
- Music by: Amitraj
- Production companies: Sangeeta Ahir Moviez Production; Mangalmurti Films
- Distributed by: AA Films
- Release date: 19 August 2022
- Running time: 130 minutes
- Country: India
- Language: Marathi
- Box office: est.₹4.15 crore

Daagadi Chawl 2 is a 2022 Indian Marathi language action thriller film, a sequel of 2015 film Dagadi Chawl. It is produced by Sangeeta Ahir under the banner of Sangeeta Ahir Moviez and directed by Chandrakant Kanse. The film stars Ankush Chaudhari, Makarand Deshpande, Pooja Sawant in lead roles. The film was theatrically released on 19 August 2022.

== Plot ==
Surya has permanently abandoned the criminal underworld of Mumbai and now lives in peace in Alibaug with his family. His past is still affecting him, though. When Daddy starts to experience issues related to the forthcoming elections, he wants Surya to go back to work.

== Cast ==
- Ankush Chaudhari as Surya aka Suryakant Shinde
- Makarand Deshpande as Daddy
- Pooja Sawant as Sonal
- Yatin Karyekar as Kaala Coat aka Adv. Godbole
- Ambrish Deshpande as Raghu
- Nachiket Purnapatre as Rashid
- Shrikant Yadav as Gulabrao More
- Vijay Nikam as Vilas Kamat
- Milind Phatak as Nana Patil
- Mayur Pawar as Barkya
- Arnav Kalkundri as Anshuman (Surya's son)
- Shivraj Walwekar as Madhavrao
- Daisy Shah in special appearance for song "Raghu Pinjryat Aala"

== Release ==
=== Theatrical ===
The film was theatrically released on 19 August 2022. Previously film was set to be released on 18 August 2022.

=== Home media ===
It was premiered on Amazon Prime Video on 18 September 2022.

== Music ==
Daagadi Chawl 2

Soundtrack album by Amitraj
- Released: 2022
- Genre: Feature film soundtrack
- Length: 11:56
- Language: Marathi
- Label: Everest Marathi

Official audio
- Daagadi Chawl 2 - Full Album on YouTube

Track listing
No.	Title	Lyrics	Music	Singer (s)	Length
1.	"Raghu Pinjryat Aala"	Kshitij Patwardhan	Amitraj	Mugdha Karhade	3:51
2.	"Mann Dhaga Dhaga"	Kshitij Patwardhan	Amitraj	Harshwardhan Wavare	3:42
3.	"Samjun Ghena"	Kshitij Patwardhan	Amitraj	Harshwardhan Wavare	3:10
4.	"Sangava Aalaya"	Kshitij Patwardhan	Amitraj	Adarsh Shinde	2:36
Total length:					11:56

== Reception ==
=== Critical reception ===
A reviewer from ABP Majha gave three and half stars out of five. A reviewer from The Times of India rates three stars out of five.

=== Box office ===
The film collected ₹0.51 crore on its opening day and ₹2.05 crore in the first weekend. In the first week film collected ₹4.15 crore.
