= Savarkhed Ek Gaon =

- Poster
- Directed by: Rajiv Patil
- Produced by: Laxmikant Bhattad; Shankar Bhattad; Rahul Bhattad
- Starring: Ankush Chaudhari; Shreyas Talpade; Vikram Gokhale; Sharvari Jamenis; Sonali Khare; Sadashiv Amrapurkar
- Cinematography: Sanjay Jadhav
- Edited by: Jafar Sultan
- Music by: Ajay-Atul
- Production company: Eera Films
- Release date: 1 April 2004
- Running time: 95 minutes
- Country: India
- Language: Marathi

Savarkhed Ek Gaon (transl. Savarkhed: A village) is a 2004 Indian Marathi-language thriller film directed by Rajiv Patil. Produced by Laxmikant Bhattad, Shankar Bhattad and Rahul Bhattad. The film starring Ankush Chaudhari, Shreyas Talpade, Sharvari Jamenis, Sonali Khare, Vikram Gokhale, Sadashiv Amrapurkar in lead roles and Makarand Anaspure, Upendra Limaye in supporting roles.

== Plot ==
Savarkhed has been awarded as a model village by the government. MLA Patil and Sampatrao More are two politicians who are enmity against each other due to different ideologies. Patil's son Rahul returns to the village after completing his education in Israel. Ajay, Ishwar, Baban, Samita are his friends from the village. Sneha, a reporter from Mumbai, comes to the village and stays with Patil to cover the news of the village, making Rahul feel close to her Jealousy. Things are going well in everyone's lives until Patil leaves on a business trip and some strange things start happening that lead to the death of a few people. Rahul and his friends have been infiltrated in their village by some unknown people who only work in the dark. They decide to stop this but wonder why these people are targeting their village.

== Cast ==
- Vikram Gokhale as Amdar/MLA Patil
- Sadashiv Amrapurkar as Sampatrao More
- Ankush Chaudhari as Rahul Patil
- Sonali Khare as Priya; Rahul's love interest
- Shreyas Talpade as Ajay
- Sharvari Jamenis as Sneha
- Makarand Anaspure as Ishya
- Upendra Limaye as Suresh
- Balkrishna Shinde as Baban
- Sanjyot Hardikar as Sameeta; Ajay's love interest
- Prashant Patil as Ghorpade

== Release ==
The film was theatrically released on 1 April 2004.

== Soundtrack ==
Savarkhed Ek Gaon

Soundtrack album by Ajay-Atul
- Released: 22 April 2014
- Genre: Feature film soundtrack
- Length: 12:03
- Language: Marathi
- Label: Video Palace

Ajay-Atul chronology
Aga Bai Arrecha! (2004)	Savarkhed Ek Gaon (2004)	Gayab (2004)

Official audio
- Savarkhed Ek Gaon - Full Album on YouTube

Music is composed by Ajay-Atul. Background score is by Chandresh, Siddharth and Suhas.

Track listing
No.	Title	Singer (s)	Length
1.	"Varyavarati Gandh Pasarla"	Kunal Ganjawala	4:55
2.	"Aai Bhavani Tuzya Krupene"	Ajay Gogawale	4:06
3.	"Hoshiyaar"	Swapnil Bhandodkar, Yogita Godbole	3:02
Total length:			12:03
