= Por Bazaar =

- Film poster
- Directed by: Manava Naik
- Story by: Parag Kulkarni
- Produced by: Ashwini Ranjit Darekar
- Starring: Ankush Chaudhari; Sai Tamhankar; Swarangi Marathe; Satya Manjrekar; Anurag Worlikar; Dharmaj Joshi; Sakheel Parchure
- Cinematography: Dhananjay Kulkarni
- Edited by: Apurva Ashish
- Music by: Shailendra Barve
- Production companies: ARD Entertainment & Video Palace
- Distributed by: Video Palace
- Release date: 19 September 2014
- Country: India
- Language: Marathi

Por Bazaar (transl. Child Trafficking) is a 2014 Marathi language thriller film which is produced by video Palace and directed by Manva Naik. It stars Sai Tamhankar, Swarangi Marathe, Satya Manjrekar, Anurag Worlikar, Dharmaj Joshi, Sakheel Parchure, and Ankush Chaudhari in negative role. Swapnil Joshi and Farhan Akhtar does a cameo in the film.

== Plot ==
One day, five college friends skip class and come across a house conducting seemingly strange activities. Soon, they find a bunch of innocent kids trapped inside and decide to investigate.

== Cast ==
- Ankush Chaudhari as Bhurabhai
- Sai Tamhankar as Shraddha Madam
- Chitra Nawathe as Bhurabhai's sidekick
- Swanand Kirkire as Manjiri's father
- Chinmayee Sumeet as Vishal's mother
- Prajakta Kulkarni as Manjiri's mother
- Swarangi Marathe as Manjiri
- Satya Manjrekar as Vishal
- Anurag Worlikar as Ajay
- Dharmaj Joshi as Samar
- Sakheel Parchure as Ragini
- Shantanu Gangane as Police Inspector
