= Punha Ekda Sade Made Teen =

2026 Indian film by Ankush Chaudhari

- Theatrical release poster
- Directed by: Ankush Chaudhari
- Written by: Ankush Chaudhari; Sandeep Dandvate
- Produced by: Usha Kakade; Pushkar Yawalkar; Sudhir Kolte; Ameya Khopkar; Swati Khopkar; Ninad Nandkumar Battin
- Starring: Ashok Saraf; Makarand Anaspure; Bharat Jadhav; Siddharth Jadhav; Rinku Rajguru; Samruddhi Kelkar; Sanket Pathak
- Cinematography: Sanjay Jadhav
- Edited by: Ashish Mhatre
- Music by: Gaurav Chati; Aditya Bedekar
- Production companies: Usha Kakade Productions; EOD Media Official; Udaharnarth Nirmit; Ameya Vinod Khopkar Pictures
- Distributed by: PVR Inox Pictures
- Release date: 13 February 2026
- Running time: 130 minutes
- Country: India
- Language: Marathi

Punha Ekda Sade Made Teen (transl. Last and Final Three Once Again) is a 2026 Indian Marathi-language comedy-drama film directed by Ankush Chaudhari. It serves as a sequel to the 2007 film Saade Maade Teen and features Ashok Saraf, Makarand Anaspure, Bharat Jadhav, Siddharth Jadhav, Rinku Rajguru, Samruddhi Kelkar and Sanket Pathak in the lead roles.

The film was theatrically released on 13 February 2026.

== Cast ==
- Ashok Saraf as Ratan
- Makarand Anaspure as Madan
- Bharat Jadhav as Chandan
- Siddharth Jadhav as Baban
- Rinku Rajguru as Kamini
- Samruddhi Kelkar as Supriya Mhatre
- Sanket Pathak as Rohan Mhatre
- Sanjay Narvekar in Baba Khatri

== Production ==
The film was officially announced in August 2024 by Ankush Chaudhari. The muhurta ceremony took place on 15 September 2024, revealing the cast, including Ashok Saraf, Makarand Anaspure, Bharat Jadhav, and Siddharth Jadhav reprising their roles, while Rinku Rajguru plays a key role. Sanjay Jadhav served as film's cinematographer. Filming wrapped up in the starting of March 2025.

== Marketing ==
The teaser was released on 5 January 2026, and trailer was released on 19 January 2026.

== Release ==
The film was initially slated for release on 14 November 2025, later rescheduled to 30 January 2026, and postponed again following the demise of Ajit Pawar in a Baramati Learjet 45 crash. Finally it was released on 13 February 2026.

The film was digitally released on 19 March 2026 on Ultra Jhakaas.

== Reception ==
=== Critical reception ===
Reshma Raikwar of Loksatta writes that the sequel has a new and slightly complex story with good performances and some entertaining moments, but the mystery is predictable, the original trio’s fun is reduced, and overall it delivers only light, average entertainment.

Sandesh Vahane of Sakal notes that weak writing affects the comedy as many punchlines don’t land, and although Siddharth Jadhav and Rinku Rajguru are appreciated, the Kurale Brothers get less screen time than in the first part; still, their chemistry, nostalgic dialogues and fun moments make the film a one-time watch despite it being weaker than the original.

== Soundtrack ==
Track listing
No.	Title	Lyrics	Singer(s)	Length
1.	"Punha Ekda Sade Made Teen"	Vikrant Hirnaik	Avadhoot Gupte	2:04
