= Pooja Sawant =

Indian film actress

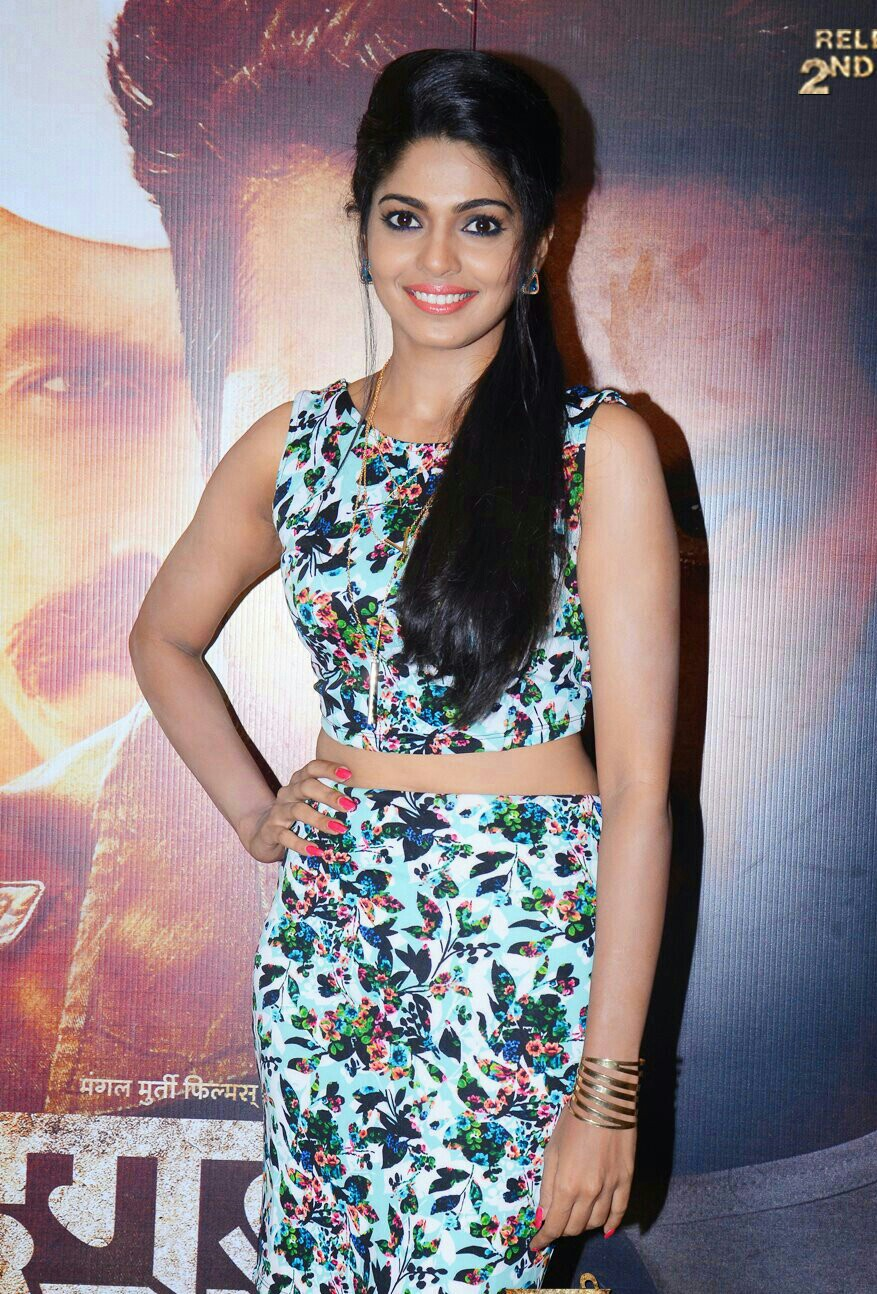
- Sawant in 2015
- Born: 25 January 1990 (age 36); Mumbai, Maharashtra, India
- Occupations: Actress; Dancer; Model
- Years active: 2010 - present
- Spouse: Siddhesh Chavan (m. 2024)

Pooja Sawant (born 25 January 1990) is an Indian actress, dancer and model. She works in Marathi and Hindi movies. She is best known for her role in the 2015 blockbuster hit Dagadi Chawl. She is also recipient of Maharashtra State Film Award for Best Actress for Her Performance in the Movie Bhetali Tu Punha.

== Personal life ==
Pooja Sawant married Siddhesh Chavan on 28 February 2024.

== Career ==
Before starting her career in films, Pooja won a beauty pageant "Maharashtra Times Sharavan Queen" in 2008. She started her career in Marathi Industry with the multistarrer film Kshanbhar Vishranti, which acquired cult status among movie lovers. In 2011, she appeared in Zhakaas opposite Ankush Choudhary, the movie was a blockbuster. Pooja again appeared in another multistarrer movie, Satrangi Re.

In 2014, she appeared in the satire blockbuster movie Poshter Boyz, opposite Aniket Vishwasrao.

As of March 2020, she is appearing in Bali, a horror film by Vishal Furia, director of her 2017 film Lapachhapi, which is slated to release on 16 April. She is set to appear in Daagdi Chawl 2, opposite Ankush Chaudhari, and Luv U Mitra, opposite Gashmeer Mahajani.

Pooja Sawant played a significant role in the popular web series 1962: The War in the Hills.

Apart from films, Pooja has been a part of several Marathi reality shows, including Ek Peksha Ek Jodicha Mamala and Jallosh Suvarnayugacha.

== Filmography ==
=== Films ===
Key
†	Denotes films that have not yet been released

Year	Title	Role	Notes	Ref.
2010	Tum Milo Toh Sahi	Bikramjeet's friend	Debut film	
2010	Kshanbhar Vishranti	Nishita		
2011	Aata Ga Baya	Mani		
2011	Zhakaas	Anagha		
2012	Satrangi Re	Jenny		
2013	Navra Maza Bhavra		Special appearance	
2013	Sanshay Kallol	Kartiki		
2013	Vanshvel	Herself	Special appearance in song "Ambe Krupa Kari"	
2014	Poshter Boyz	Kalpana (Kalpu)		
2014	Gondan	Devyani		
2014	Sanngto Aika	Kshiti		
2015	Sata Lota Pan Sagla Khota	Isha		
2015	Nilkanth Master	Indu		
2015	Dagadi Chawl	Sonal Shinde		
2016	Natsamrat	Stage actress	Special appearance	
2016	Vrundavan	Pooja		
2016	Cheater	Mrudula (Mimo)		
2017	Lapachhapi	Neha		
2017	Bus Stop	Anushka		
2017	Bhetli Tu Punha	Ashwini Sarang		
2019	Bhai: Vyakti Ki Valli 2	Jaymala		
2019	Junglee	Shankara	Hindi film	
2020	Bonus	Minal Bhoir		
2020	Vijeta	Nalini Jagtap		
2021	Bali	Dr. Radhika Shenoy		
2022	Daagadi Chawl 2	Sonal Shinde		
2024	Musafiraa	Megha		
2024	Crakk	Herself	Hindi film; cameo appearance in the song "Rom Rom"	
2025	Mukkam Post Devach Ghar		Special appearance	
2025	Tu Me Ani Amaira	Carol		
2025	Ambat Shaukin	Janhavi		
2026	Sakhe Ga Saajani	Anju		
2026	Salbardi	PO Manorama Pradhan		
2026	Cup Bashi	Amruta Paradkar Karekar		
2026	Drushya Adrushya	Tanvi Pradhan		
2026	Lagna Aani Barach Kahi	Pallavi		

=== Television ===
Year	Title	Role	Network	Ref.
2008	Boogie Woogie	Contestant	Sony TV	
2011	Eka Peksha Ek Jodicha Mamla	Contestant	Zee Marathi	
2012	Jallosh Suvarnayugacha	Contestant	Colors Marathi	
2013	Wajale Ki Bara	Anchor	Zee Talkies	
2020–2021	Maharashtra's Best Dancer	Judge	Sony Marathi	
2021	Metro Park	Guest appearance	Eros Now	
2021	1962: The War in the Hills	Padma	Disney+Hotstar	

=== Music video ===
- Akhiyan (2022)

== Accolades ==
Award	Year	Category	Nominated work	Result	Ref.
Dadasaheb Phalke International Film Festival	2018	Best Actress	Lapachhapi	Won	
Edinburgh International Film Festival	2017	The Golden Calton for Best Actress	Lapachhapi	Won	
Fakt Marathi Cine Sanman	2022	Best Performance in a Negative Role	Bali	Nominated	
Filmfare Awards Marathi	2018	Best Actress	Lapachhapi	Nominated	
Maharashtra State Film Awards	2018	Best Actress	Bhetali Tu Punha	Won	
Maharashtracha Favourite Kon?	2015	Popular Face of the Year	—N/a	Nominated	
Maharashtracha Favourite Kon?	2016	Popular Face of the Year	—N/a	Nominated	
Maharashtracha Favourite Kon?	2018	Lux Diva Award	—N/a	Won	
Maharashtracha Favourite Kon?	2023	Popular Face of the Year	—N/a	Nominated	
Zee Chitra Gaurav Puraskar	2016	Best Actress	Dagadi Chawl	Nominated	
Zee Chitra Gaurav Puraskar	2018	Best Actress	Lapachhapi	Nominated	
