= Deva (2017 film) =

- Directed by: Murali Nallappa
- Written by: Unni R.
- Screenplay by: Unni R., Martin Prakkat
- Based on: Charlie by Martin Prakkat
- Produced by: Prateek Chakravorty
- Starring: Ankush Chaudhari; Tejaswini Pandit; Spruha Joshi; Mohan Agashe; Pandharinath Kamble; Mayur Pawar; Reema Lagoo; Jaywant Wadkar; Vaibhav Mangle
- Cinematography: Vijay Mishra, Bharat R. Parthasarathy
- Edited by: Sanjay Sankla
- Music by: Amitraj
- Production companies: Innovative Films, Pramod Films
- Release date: 22 December 2017
- Country: India
- Language: Marathi

Deva is a 2017 Indian Marathi-language romantic drama film, directed by Murali Nallappa and produced by Prateek Chakravorty. The film stars Ankush Chaudhari, Tejaswini Pandit, Spruha Joshi. It is a remake of 2015 Malayalam adventure drama Charlie.

A 90-second teaser of the film released online on YouTube was not too warmly received by many Malayalam viewers, with some calling it a 'carbon copy' of the original, and a 'dishonor to the [2015] Malayalam movie'.

== Plot ==
Maya Deshmukh (Tejaswini Pandit) is a celebrated author struggling to pen her second novel. When she discovers her mother's plans for an arranged marriage, Maya flees her home, seeking refuge with a friend. This leads her to a secluded retreat in the scenic Konkan region—an ideal sanctuary for a writer chasing lost inspiration.

Upon arrival, she becomes fascinated by the legend of Deva (Ankush Chaudhari), the property's elusive owner. A nomadic soul with a reputation for boundless generosity, Deva lives for a single purpose: bringing joy to others by any means necessary. Captivated by the stories of this mysterious wanderer, Maya sets out on a journey to retrace his footsteps, hoping to uncover the man behind the myth.

== Cast ==
- Ankush Chaudhari as Deva
- Tejaswini Pandit as Maya
- Spruha Joshi as Meera
- Mohan Agashe as Krishnakant
- Vaibhav Mangle as Bhalchandra
- Reema Lagoo as Shalini
- Pandharinath Kamble as Raghu Barve
- Mayur Pawar as Raosaheb / Gotya
- Jyoti Chandekar as Maya's Mother
- Jaywant Wadkar
- Reshma Shinde as Shruti
- Soumya Kulkarni as Tanu
- Anuradha Rajadhyaksh as Maya's mother

== Reviews ==
Times of India gave it 2.5 stars. It wrote " Deva doesn’t hold your attention for long. It falters in executing the story that has potential. Tejaswini and Ankush put in their heart in their roles but that doesn’t save the film from becoming a tedious watch. Even Spruha Joshi’s effort is wasted here. Deva promises entertainment but watch this one strictly if you are a Ankush Chaudhari fan." Abhay Salvi of Marathistars.com wrote "‘Deva’ is one of Ankush Chaudhari's worst films till date. His performance too is plainly single toned. Even if you're his fan it would be really difficult to like this film! Though you can still try if you want to!".

== Soundtrack ==
No.	Title	Singer(s)	Length
1	"Deva Anthem"	Ajay Gogavale	3:03
2	"Roj Roj Navyane"	Sonu Nigam, Shreya Ghoshal	4:42
1	"Jarashi Jarashi"	Harshvardhan Wavare	2:35
