= Dagadi Chawl =

- Theatrical Release Poster
- Directed by: Chandrakant Kanse
- Written by: Ajay Tamhane
- Screenplay by: Adesh K. Arjun; Chandrakant Kanse
- Story by: Suresh B. Sawant; Naresh Pardeshi
- Produced by: Amol D. Kale; Suresh B. Sawant
- Starring: Ankush Chaudhari; Pooja Sawant; Makarand Deshpande
- Cinematography: Aniket Khandagale
- Edited by: Kshitija Khandagale
- Music by: Amitraj
- Production companies: Manglmurti Films.; Sai Pooja Film & Entertainment Production
- Distributed by: Raksha Entertainment
- Release date: 2 October 2015 (Theatrical)
- Running time: 120 minutes
- Country: India
- Language: Marathi
- Box office: ₹37 crore (US$3.9 million)

Dagadi Chawl (Marathi: दगडी चाळ) (also known as Dagdi Chawl) is a 2015 Marathi language action thriller film directed by first-time director Chandrakant Kanse. Presented by Manglmurti films and produced by Sai Pooja Films & Entertainments, Dagadi Chawl features an ensemble cast of Ankush Chaudhari, Makarand Deshpande and Pooja Sawant in lead roles. It is the third release for Ankush Chaudhari in 2015 after back to back films Classmates and Double Seat. Official teaser of the film was released with Tu Hi Re on 4 September 2015 and was published on YouTube on 5 September 2015 which met with very good response.

Official poster and trailer of the film were unveiled on 21 September 2015, which gains praises for dashing style of Ankush Chaudhari, his chemistry with Pooja Sawant and look of Makarand Deshpande as 'daddy' which was kept as a secret for long period of time. Film was released on 2 October 2015.

The movie became an instant hit for Chaudhari After the release of the film, fans poured milk on a big poster of Ankush Chaudhari outside a Bharat mata cinema hall in Mumbai to show their love for him, a first time in history of Marathi Cinema that something of this sort has happened. It has been dubbed into Hindi as Daagdi Chaawl Ek Bagawat. The Marathi and Hindi world television premier were scheduled for 12 June 2016 on Star Pravah and STAR Gold respectively. The movie will be first Marathi film to premiere on STAR Gold UK.

== Plot ==
The movie is inspired from Mumbai's actual Dagdi Chawl which was known for gangster activities during 80's and 90's and was also the official residence of a gangster turned political leader Arun Gawli popularly known as 'Daddy'.

The film begins in 1996, when Mumbai is troubled by frequent gang wars between criminal groups across the city. Chandrakant Parab, also known as Chandu Mama, works as an extortionist for Arun Gawli, known as Daddy, the don of Byculla who operates from Dagdi Chawl. As Daddy prepares to contest upcoming elections, he attempts to eliminate several opposing candidates. During one such attempt, Chandu threatens a former MLA in a shootout in which the latter’s bodyguard and driver are killed. Angry over the incident, Daddy reprimands Chandu and orders him to go underground for some time. Daddy's lawyer Godbole, also known as Kala Coat, asks who will handle the extortion activities in Chandu’s absence, when a young man arrives at Dagdi Chawl. At the same time, DCP Khan takes charge of investigating the case. The police commissioner informs him about a new entrant in the Byculla gang who is known for being calm and having no prior criminal background. Khan is surprised to learn that the man is Suryakant Shinde, also known as Surya, the son of one of Khan’s honest subordinates. Khan then explains to the commissioner how he first became acquainted with Surya. Six months earlier, Khan had laid a trap to capture two members of the Ansari gang. During the encounter, one of the criminals is killed by Inspector Kale, a police officer known for carrying out encounter killings. While the police pursue the second criminal, Surya intervenes and helps rescue a girl who was being held hostage. Khan is impressed by Surya’s courage and presence of mind. Later, during the Ganesh Visarjan celebrations, Surya’s Ganesh mandal faces opposition from a local gang leader named Sattar Memon, who refuses to allow the procession through his area. Surya confronts Sattar and defeats his men when they attempt to attack him. When Sattar later attempts to create a disturbance during the procession, Surya and his group manage to control the situation. Surya is subsequently contacted by Kala Coat to collect protection money from a builder named Desai. Surya settles the matter and delivers the money to Dagdi Chawl. However, Desai files a police complaint against him. Khan orders Surya’s arrest, and Inspector Kale takes him into custody with the intention of staging a fake encounter. Khan arrives in time and prevents the killing. During interrogation, Khan criticises Surya for entering the world of crime despite being the son of a policeman. He offers to help Surya if he explains everything that happened during the previous six months. Surya then narrates the events that led him into the criminal world. Surya, a lower-middle-class resident of Abhyudaya Chawl in Mumbai, works as a garage mechanic after completing an ITI course, along with his friend Mukesh. He is in love with his neighbour Sonal and proposes marriage to her. The situation changes when some local youths harass Sonal during her birthday celebration and are beaten by Surya. Both families react angrily, and Sonal’s parents decide to send her to Nashik for safety. Mukesh advises Surya to lie low in Mahabaleshwar. Surya and Sonal leave Mumbai at night by bus to travel there. During the journey, the bus is stopped by a group of criminals who turn out to be Chandu’s men. Chandu assaults Sonal, leading Surya to stab him in self-defence. Surya and Sonal escape into the forest and later marry in a temple. Surya keeps in touch with Mukesh and his father through phone calls for several days. One day, Mukesh urgently asks Surya to return to Mumbai. When Surya arrives, he learns that his father has been killed. During his father’s cremation, Chandu and his associates attack Surya again. Surya manages to fight them off and escape. Inspector Kale then places police personnel outside the chawl to capture Surya. Mukesh introduces Surya to a corporator named Rane, who in turn connects them with Raju Nepali, a mediator among Mumbai’s criminal groups. Raju informs Daddy about Surya, who asks to meet him at Dagdi Chawl. After hearing Surya’s account, Daddy reprimands Chandu but also realises that Surya’s actions could weaken the authority of his gang. As a test, Daddy orders Surya to collect money from a jeweller named Neminath Shah. Despite Mukesh’s objections, Surya accepts the task. Using his knowledge of Shah’s past crimes and personal affairs, Surya compels him to pay the money. While returning with the cash, Surya is captured by Inspector Kale and tortured to reveal who ordered the extortion. Surya refuses to disclose the information. Kale then takes Surya to Dagdi Chawl, where it is revealed that Kale works for Daddy and that the interrogation was intended to test Surya’s loyalty. Although Daddy offers him a permanent role in the gang, Surya initially declines. A few days later, Surya is attacked by unidentified gunmen and is hospitalised. Kala Coat visits him and asks him to join Daddy’s organisation. Surya eventually agrees and begins assisting Daddy with activities related to the upcoming election campaign. He also succeeds in collecting money from a diamond merchant named Narottam Das. After Surya finishes narrating his story, Khan asks him to testify against Daddy in court in connection with the complaint filed by builder Desai. However, Surya refuses, stating that Daddy had ensured the safety of his family. Before Daddy’s final election rally, Khan informs Surya and Godbole that there is a plot to assassinate Daddy. The police identify three suspects—Wasim Khan, Nawazuddin, and Sayyed Ansari—but believe there is a fourth conspirator involved. During the rally, Surya and Khan’s team locate and apprehend the suspects, who reveal that they were hired by Inspector Kale. Daddy orders his men to find Kale. Surya eventually captures him, and Kale reveals that Chandu was behind the conspiracy to kill Daddy. When confronted, Chandu admits that he orchestrated the entire plot and was responsible for killing Surya’s father. Surya defeats both Chandu and Kale, and Daddy orders him to execute them. After carrying out the order, Surya and Daddy part ways, with Daddy assuring him of help in the future if required. Surya returns to Abhyudaya Chawl, but his past involvement in crime continues to follow him.

== Cast ==
- Ankush Chaudhari as Surya
- Makarand Deshpande as Daddy
- Pooja Sawant as Sonal
- Sanjay Khapre as Mama
- Kamlesh Sawant as Inspector Kale
- Yatin Karyekar as Daddy's Assistant aka Kala Coat
- Sandeep Vasantrao Gaikwad as Mukesh
- Gautam Berde as Desai Builder
- Yogesh Markande as Informer

== Soundtrack ==
Daagdi Chaawl

Soundtrack album by Amitraj
- Released: 14 September 2015
- Genre: Film soundtrack
- Length: 9:03
- Label: Everest Entertainment Pvt. Ltd.

Amitraj chronology
Tu Hi Re (2015)	Daagdi Chaawl (2015)	Guru (2016)

Music for this action film is composed by Amitraj, while lyrics are penned by Mandar Cholkar and Kshitij Patwardhan. Makers of the film released first song "Morya", a devotional track in the voice of Adarsh Shinde, on 15 September on YouTube which became an instant hit. Second song "Dhaga Dhaga" also became popular.

=== Track listing ===
Daagdi Chaawl
No.	Title	Singer(s)	Length
1.	"Morya Morya"	Adarsh Shinde	4:35
2.	"Dhaga Dhaga"	Harshavardhan Wavare, Aanandi Joshi	4:28
Total length:			9:03

== Release ==
Film was set for release on 2 October 2015 in theaters all over Maharashtra, Goa, Gujarat and in selected cities of Karnataka.

== Reception ==
The film has received positive reviews. ABP Majha gave 4 out of 5 stars and declared movie "Fast-paced crime action flick". Pune Mirror gave 3 out of 5 stars and declared movie "Well made, the film keeps you involved". Maharashtra Times gave 3 out of 5 stars and declared movie "As total entertainer". Times of India gave 3 out of 5 stars.

== Box office ==
Daagdi Chaawl collected ₹5.75 crore (US$600,000) net in first week and ₹3 crore (US$310,000) in second week. The film grossed around ₹37 crore (US$3.9 million) at the box office.

== Sequel ==
In June 2022, Daagadi Chawl 2 was announced with teaser to release in theatres on 19 August 2022.

== See also ==
- Killing Veerappan
- Major
- Rakta Charitra
