= Baghtos Kay Mujra Kar =

2017 film by Hemant Dhome

- Directed by: Hemant Dhome
- Screenplay by: Hemant Dhome
- Story by: Hemant Dhome
- Produced by: Gopal Taiwade Patil; Vaishnavi Jadhav
- Starring: Jitendra Joshi; Hemant Dhome; Aniket Vishwasrao; Akshay Tanksale
- Cinematography: Milind Jog
- Edited by: Faisal Mahadik; Imran Mahadik
- Music by: Amitraj
- Production companies: Ganraj Associates; Everest Entertainment
- Distributed by: Eros International
- Release date: 3 February 2017
- Running time: 142 minutes
- Country: India
- Language: Marathi

Baghtos Kay Mujra Kar (transl. What Are You Staring At?, Just Salute!) is a 2017 Indian Marathi-language political comedy-drama film which is directed by Hemant Dhome. It stars Jitendra Joshi, Aniket Vishwasrao and Akshay Tanksale in lead roles. The film was released on 3 February 2017.

== Plot ==
Settled at the foothills of a fort is a quaint village 'Kharbujewaadi'. This village is a land of many a 'Mavla' who served Shivaji Maharaj with great valour. The courage, grit and sacrifice that this village had to offer, played a major role in King Shivaji's fight for 'Hindavi Swarajya'.

But ... those were the days. Today, Kharbujewadi is a much developed modern town. Their eternal loyalty to the Maratha king Shivaji, forever on exhibit, the village is strewn with shops named: Shivaji Vada Pav Centre, Jijamata Saree Corner, Sambhaji Pan Shop, Tanaji Medicals etc. Unfortunately, their love for their beloved king is limited to the signboards, slogans on the cars and saffron coloured tilak on the foreheads.

The most important symbol of the Hindavi Swarajya, the forts of Shivaji are long forgotten. The once majestic fort overlooking this buzzing town lays in ruins, tainted with tobacco laden spit, garbage, empty beer bottles and lovers declaring their love for each other on the same walls where the brave mawlas spilt their blood for Swarajya.

What is this outrageous plan? Is it going to work? Will their dream to restore this fort become a reality?

== Cast ==
- Jitendra Joshi as Nanasaheb Deshmukh
- Aniket Vishwasrao as Pandurang Shinde
- Akshay Tanksale as Shivraj Vahadne
- Hemant Dhome as Samsher Patil
- Parna Pethe as Shivraj's wife
- Rasika Sunil as Pandurang's wife
- Neha Joshi as Nansaheb wife
- Ashwini Kalsekar
- Vikram Gokhale as politician
- Rohit Haldikar as Wanted
- Sonalee Kulkarni as Gauri Bhosale (special appearance)

== Release ==
Baghtos Kay Mujra Kar set to release on 3 February 2017 with English subtitles in Maharashtra, Gujarat, Goa, Madhya Pradesh, Delhi, Karnataka, Andhra Pradesh and Telangana.

== Publicity ==
The trailer of the film is revealed on 5 January 2017 on Sinhagad Fort. This was the first instance when a trailer launch was held on a fort.

== Soundtrack ==
Baghtos Kay Mujra Kar

Soundtrack album by Amitraj
- Released: 22 December 2016
- Genre: Feature film soundtrack
- Length: 21:42
- Language: Marathi
- Label: Everest Entertainment

Amitraj chronology
Laal Ishq (2016)	Baghtos Kay Mujra Kar (2016)	Fugay (2017)

The songs for the film are composed by Amitraj and written by Kshitij Patwardhan.

No.	Title	Singer(s)	Length
1.	"The Promise - Baghtos Kay Mujra Kar (Title Track)"	Siddharth Mahadevan	04:11
2.	"Ti Talwar"	Adarsh Shinde	05:30
3.	"Tu Disate"	Harshavardhan Wavare, Kasturi Wavare	03:33
4.	"Majhya Raja Ra"	Adarsh Shinde	05:59
5.	"Gavran Kombada"	Anand Shinde	02:29
Total length:			21:42
