= Rajiv Patil =

Film director

- Died: 1 October 2013; Mumbai, Maharashtra
- Occupations: Writer, Director
- Notable work: Jogwa

Rajiv Patil was a National Film Awards Winner, Marathi film director, best known for directing the film Jogwa. He was a Nashik based theatre writer and director. He also directed the Marathi movie "Vanshvel" and "72 Miles: Ek Pravas".

Patil died following a heart attack in Mumbai's Bhagwati Hospital on, Oct 1, 2013.

== Filmography ==
- Savarkhed Ek Gaon (2004)
- Jai 18 Bhuja saptshrungimata (2006)
- Blind Game (2006)
- Oxigen (2008)
- Sanai Choughade (2008)
- Jogwa (2008)
- Pangira (2010)
- 72 Miles: Ek Pravas (2013)
- Vanshvel (2013)

== Awards and recognitions ==
- 5 National Film Awards For Jogwa Including National Film Award for Best Film on Social Issues
- Maharashtra State Film Awards For Jogwa Including Best Film, Best Director
- V. Shantaram Best Film Awards For Jogwa
- Sanskruti Kaladarpan Best Film Awards For Jogwa
- MA.TA. Sanman Best Film Awards For Jogwa
