= Suhas Shirvalkar =

Marathi writer

Suhas Shirvalkar (15 November 1948 – 11 July 2003) was a Marathi writer from Maharashtra, India. He is known for his diverse literary works, which include social novels, detective stories, short stories, one-act plays, newspaper columns, and poems.

Throughout his career, Shirvalkar authored more than 300 books, making him one of the most prolific writers in Marathi literature. Among his notable works is the widely acclaimed novel Duniyadari, which is considered a landmark in his writing. This novel delves into the lives of college students and resonated deeply with readers.

Shirvalkar's expertise in the detective-thriller genre is evident in his creation of memorable characters such as Barrister Amar Vishwas (बॅ. अमर विश्वास), Firoz Irani (फिरोज ईराणी), Mandar Patwardhan (मंदार पटवर्धन), and Dara Buland (दारा बुलंद). Additionally, he skillfully explored subjects like medicine and astrology in his writings, showcasing his versatility as an author.

Beyond his novels and detective stories, Shirvalkar also displayed his storytelling prowess in the historical novel Roopmati, which provided readers with a glimpse into the past. One of his short stories, Devaki, was adapted into a Marathi film that received a State award for best story.

Shirvalkar's contributions extended to the realm of journalism as well. His newspaper columns, including "Ityadi-Ityadi," "Vartulatim Mansa," and "Phalashruti," garnered significant praise from readers.

Shirvalkar died in Mumbai due to a cardiac arrest.

== Works ==
=== Social novels ===
- Veshipalikade – वेशीपलीकडे
- Objection your honour – ऑब्जेक्शन, युवर ऑनर
- Wonder Twelve – वंडर ट्वेल्व्ह
- Mukti – मुक्ती
- Kovlik – कोवळीक
- Talkhi – तलखी
- Insaniyat – इन्सानियत
- Saalam – सालम
- Sorry Sir – सॉरी सर
- Jameen-Aasman – जमीन-आसमान
- Vastvik – वास्तविक
- Jai – जाई
- Antim – अंतिम
- Kshanokshani – क्षणोक्षणी
- Swikrut – स्वीकृत
- Thararak – थरारक
- Pahatwara – पहाटवारा
- Duniyadari – दुनियादारी
- Dastan – दास्तान
- Talaash – तलाश
- Barsat Chandnyachi – बरसात चांदण्याची
- Samantar – समांतर
- Asim – असीम
- Kosal – कोसळ
- Pratikar – प्रतिकार
- Prayas – प्रयास
- Bandist – बंदिस्त
- Something – समथिंग
- Rupmati – रूपमती
- Nidan – निदान
- Kateri – काटेरी
- Mhanun – म्हणून
- Sansanati – सनसनाटी
- Tukda Tukda Chandra – तुकडा तुकडा चंद्र
- Jata-Yeta – जाता-येता
- Thodkyat Asa – थोडक्यात असं
- Akher – अखेर
- Mahaparv – महापर्व
- Oh God – ओ गॉsड
- Kshitij – क्षितीज
- Vratasth – व्रतस्थ
- Gadhul – गढूळ
- Kalpant – कल्पांत
- Ammal – अंमल
- Ded End – डेड एन्ड
- SpellBound – स्पेलबाउन्ड
- Hindosta Hamara – हिंदोस्ता हमारा
- Latkanti – लटकन्ती
- Zoom – झूम
- Satr – सत्र
- Rajros – राजरोस
- Madhuchandra – मधुचंद्र
- Nyay-Anyay – न्याय-अन्याय
- Hrudaysparsh – हृदयस्पर्श
- Kshan Kshan Aayushy – क्षण क्षण आयुष्य
- Zal-Gel – झालं-गेलं
- Kalshaar – काळंशार
- Zalak – झलक
- Palmul – पाळंमुळं
- Chuk-Bhul...Dene Ghene – चूक-भूल...देणे घेणे
- Hamkhas – हमखास
- Kramashaa – क्रमश:
- Kalber – काळंबेर
- Savdhaan – सावधाSन
- Sutrabaddha – सूत्रबद्ध
- Nimittmatra -निमित्तमात्र
- Star Hunters – स्टार-हंटर्स
- Varchasv – वर्चस्व
- Kalap – कळप
- Praktan - प्राक्तन

=== Detective stories ===
- Ustad – उस्ताद
- Shally Shally – शॅली शॅली
- Shabdvedh – शब्दवेध
- Jivhari – जिव्हारी
- Solid – सॉलिड
- Afalatun – अफलातून
- Khajina – खजिना
- Chakrvyuah – चक्रव्युह
- Kalank – कलंक
- Khuni Paus – खुनी पाऊस
- Shaitali – शैताली
- Madhyaratrichi Kinkali – मध्यरात्रीची किंकाळी
- GubGub – गुबगुब
- Kill Crazy – किल-क्रेझी
- Maranottar – मरणोत्तर
- Hello-Hello – हॅलो-हॅलो
- Binshart – बिनशर्त
- Janiv – जाणीव
- Matam – मातम
- Madhyam – माध्यम
- Stupid – स्टुपिड
- Jivghena – जीवघेणा
- Atarkya – अतर्क्य
- Silence Please – सायलेन्स प्लीज
- Sanshay – संशय
- Order Order – ऑर्डर-ऑर्डर
- Terrific – टेरेफिक
- Murder House – मर्डर हाऊस
- Adnyat – अज्ञात
- Anubhav – अनुभव
- Yogayog – योगायोग
- Asahya – असह्य
- Nirakar – निराकार
- Saitanghar – सैतानघर
- Challenge – चॅलेंज
- Tharraat – थरराट्
- Bhannat – भन्नाट
- Poladi – पोलादी
- Avadhavya – अवाढव्य
- Ijjat – इज्जत
- Last Bullet – लास्ट बुलेट
- Aakrosh – आक्रोश
- Sannata – सन्नाटा
- Sahaj – सहज
- Dead Shot – डेड शॉट
- Panchali – पांचाली
- Trailer Girl – ट्रेलर गर्ल
- Havyas – हव्यास
- Gafil – गाफील
- Black Cobra – ब्लॅक कोब्रा
- Gold Heaven – गोल्ड हेवन
- Operation Bullet – ऑपरेशन बुलेट
- Safai – सफाई
- To – तो
- Kale Yug – काळे युग
- Bhayanak – भयानक
- Hiravi Nazar – हिरवी नजर
- Not Guilty – नॉट गिल्टी
- Highway Murder – हायवे मर्डर
- Padadyaaad- पडद्याआड
- Dhuk-Dhuk – धुकंधुकं
- Kanakanane – कणाकणाने
- MantraJagar – मंत्रजागर
- Saraeet - सराईत
- Loop Hole – लूप-होल
- Down Level – डाऊन लेव्हल

=== Others ===
- Ek Phakt Ekach – एक ...फक्त एकच
- Thank you Mr Newspaper – थँक यू मि. न्यूज पेपर
- Kathapournima – कथा – पौर्णिमा
- Ithun – Tithun – इथून – तिथून
- Everything So Simple – एवरीथिंग... सोSसिम्पल
- Mahaul – माहौल
- Shads – शेड्स
- Moods – मूड्स
- Ityadi Ityadi – इत्यादी – इत्यादी
- Vartulatil Manas – वर्तुळातील माणसं
- Phalsruti – फलश्रुती
- Aso – असो
- Swargawar Swari – स्वर्गावर स्वारी
- Garvharan – गर्वहरण
- Mattha Aadnyadharak – मठ्ठ आज्ञाधारक
- Murkhancha Pahunchar – मुर्खांचा पाहुणचार
- Haat-Tichya – हाSत-तिच्या
- Maanvay Tasmey Namaha – मानवाय तस्मे नमः
- Aavartan – आवर्तन
- Just Happening – जस्ट हॅपनिंग
- Suhas Shirvalkar Yanchya Kavita – सुहास शिरवळकर यांच्या कविता
