= Dashakriya =

- Directed by: Sandeep Bhalachandra Patil
- Produced by: Kalpana Vilas Kothari
- Starring: Dilip Prabhavalkar; Manoj Joshi; Aditi Deshpande; Nandkishor Chougulep
- Cinematography: Mahesh Aney
- Edited by: Sunil Jadhav
- Music by: Amitraj
- Release date: 17 November 2017
- Country: India
- Language: Marathi

Dashkriya (transl. The tenth-day funeral ritual) is a 2017 Marathi language film directed by Sandeep Bhalchandra Patil, produced by Kalpana Vilas Kothari. The film starring Manoj Joshi, Dilip Prabhawalkar, Aditi Deshpande, Nandkishor Choughule and Milind Shinde. The film won the National Film Award for Best Feature Film in Marathi at India's 64th National Film Awards. The film was released on 17 November 2017.

== Synopsis ==
Amid undercurrents of rebellion, priests like Keshav make money hand over fist by commercializing Dashakriya, a post-cremation ritual. Young coin diver Banya gets acquainted with the tricks of their trade and puts it to good use in an hour of need.

== Cast ==
- Manoj Joshi as Keshav Bhat
- Dilip Prabhawalkar as Patre Savkar
- Aditi Deshpande as Shanta
- Aarya Adhav as Bhanya
- Nandkishor Choughule as Piraji
- Milind Shinde as Milind
- Milind Phatak as Narayan
- Santosh Mayekar as Tukaram
- Uma Sardeshmukh as Savkarinbai
- Vinayak Ghadigaonkar as Kirkirya
- Umesh Mitkari as Avdhoot
- Asha Shelar as Aatyabai

== Soundtrack ==
Dashakriya

Soundtrack album by Amitraj
- Released: 2017
- Recorded: 2017
- Genre: Feature film soundtrack
- Length: 8:13
- Language: Marathi

Official audio
- Dashakriya – Full Album on YouTube

Track listing
No.	Title	Singer(s)	Length
1.	"Gurujicha Mhatara"	Arohi Mhatre, Aarti Kelkar, Kasturi Wavare, Pruthviraj Mali, Swapnil Bandodkar	3:29
2.	"Jagnyache Deva"	Arohi Mhatre, Kasturi Wavare, Pruthviraj Mali, Swapnil Bandodkar	2:24
3.	"Zimma"	Arohi Mhatre, Kasturi Wavare, Pruthviraj Mali, Swapnil Bandodkar	2:20
Total length:			8:13

== Critical reception ==
Dashakriya received Positive reviews from critics. A Reviewer of Divya Marathi gave the film 4 stars out of 5 and says "Dashkriya' exposes the looting in the name of religion". Mukund Kule of Maharashtra Times gave the film 3 stars out of 5 and wrote "The rest of the technical aspects of the movie are also fine. Songs appear here and there. But the content of the movie is strong. That same feeling is consumed". Ganesh Matkari of Pune Mirror wrote "In the end, Dashakriya feels like a missed opportunity, a possibility of a great film, settling merely for an average one".

== Controversy ==
In the movie Dashakriya, Brahmins and Hindu traditions have been defamed. Therefore, the Akhil Bharatiya Brahmin Mahasabha demanded that his exhibition be banned. The Aurangabad bench of the Bombay High Court dismissed the plea seeking a ban on the film. Freedom of speech and expression is inevitable. The High Court expressed the opinion that a creative person should get freedom of expression within the ambit of law through plays, movies etc.
