= Duniyadari =

2013 Marathi romantic comedy drama film

- Theatrical release poster
- Directed by: Sanjay Jadhav
- Screenplay by: Chinmay Mandlekar
- Story by: Duniyadari by Shri Suhas Shirvalkar
- Produced by: Deepak Rane
- Starring: Swapnil Joshi; Ankush Chaudhari; Urmila Kanitkar Kothare; Sai Tamhankar; Jitendra Joshi; Sushant Shelar; Uday Sabnis; Uday Tikekar; Varsha Usgaonkar; Sandeep Kulkarni; Nagesh Bhosale
- Cinematography: Prasad Bhende
- Edited by: Aashish Mhatre; Apurva Motiwale
- Music by: Pankaj Padghan; Amitraj; Sameer Saptiskar
- Production company: Dreaming 24/7 Productions
- Distributed by: Essel Vision Productions
- Release date: 19 July 2013 (Maharashtra)
- Running time: 148 minutes
- Country: India
- Language: Marathi
- Budget: ₹2.5 crore
- Box office: ₹32 crore

Duniyadari (transl. Worldliness ) is a 2013 Indian Marathi-language coming-of-age romantic comedy drama film directed by Sanjay Jadhav and produced by Deepak Rane under Dreaming 24/7 Productions. The features an ensemble cast of Swapnil Joshi, Ankush Chaudhari, Urmila Kanitkar Kothare, Sai Tamhankar, Jitendra Joshi, Sushant Shelar, Uday Sabnis, Uday Tikekar, Varsha Usgaonkar, Sandeep Kulkarni, and Nagesh Bhosle. It is based on the novel of the same name by Suhas Shirvalkar. The film is considered cult film in Marathi cinema.

The film was released theatrically on 19 July 2013 and emerged as a blockbuster, grossed over ₹32 crore (US$3.8 million) at the box office. It became the only Indian film of the decade (2010–2020) to complete a 50-week run in cinemas and was the highest-grossing Marathi film at the time. This record was later surpassed by Timepass. The film was remade in Kannada as Noorondu Nenapu (2017) and in Gujarati as Duniyadari (2023). It won the MFK Award for Favourite Film.

== Plot ==
The film opens with grandmother Shirin with a streak of grey accompanying grandfather Pritam to Pune, grandchildren in tow. The story traces itself back to presumably the late 1970s (seen through the bell-bottom pants on the gentlemen and the polka-dot dresses and "Asha Parekh" salwar kameezes on the ladies). Nothing is spelt out, but each character and its relevance in the plot is unveiled through the narrative that revolves around Shreyas Talwalkar, a youngster in his early 20s from Mumbai, who is caught up in a bitter relationship with his father, Sudhir, and his mother, Rani. After scoring poor passing marks in graduation, Shreyas is forcefully admitted by his mother into the S. P. College in Pune for his post-graduation. After arriving in Pune, Shreyas finds his accommodation in a college hostel and encounters the rowdy and notorious Digambar Shankar Patil, also known as Digya, and his hangout gang consisting of Ashkya, Nitya, Sorry, Shree and Umya, a bunch of hooligans. Digya is in relationship with his long-time neighbourhood friend, Surekha Bhate, who is also a part of the gang. The hangout gang members add vibrant colours to the otherwise disturbed life of Shreyas, who is from a rich family but is deprived of love and friendship. A do-gooder standing tall for friendships, Shreyas becomes the voice of reason for the rustic gang of the creepy Saainath Dedgaonkar, also known as Saai, who is Digya's archrival and the son of a local politician, Diwakarrao Dedgaonkar.

Soon, the hangout gang of Digya comes across the brother and sister duo of Pritam and Shirin Ghatge, who are the children of a renowned MLA from Kolhapur, Vinayakrao Ghatge, who has mercilessly disowned his own daughter. Pritam is also a student of post-graduate studies and becomes friendly with Shreyas and his other friends, while Shirin is a medical student and a frequent visitor to their college. Shreyas falls in love at first sight with Shirin and their friendship grows. After Inspector Ramesh Inamdar slaps Shreyas for misdemeanour, Digya and his friends advise Shreyas to flirt with his beautiful daughter, Meenakshi, also known as Meenu, as a challenge to teach a lesson to her adamant father. However, Meenu falls in love with Shreyas in the process at the expense of Shirin which creates a love triangle. Jealous about the growing friendship between Digya and Shreyas, Ashkya breaks away from the gang and joins Saai's group. On Shirin's birthday, Shreyas is shocked to discover that her father has arranged her marriage with Saai against her wishes. Watching Shreyas coming closer to Meenu, Shirin reluctantly accepts Saai's proposal and brings Meenu closer to Shreyas with the help of Pritam. As Shirin repeatedly rejects his advances, Shreyas faces a dilemma and miserably declares his love for Meenu in the presence of Shirin while wishing neither of them to be unhappy. Meanwhile, Digya is devastated to find Surekha will marry a stranger at the behest of her father, Anna Bhate, who does not approve of Digya.

After his father's untimely death, Shreyas's mother reveals to him that she was deeply in love with his namesake, Shreyas Gokhale, during her college days and that her family arranged her marriage with Shreyas's father against her wishes. Shreyas's mother made a deal with his father that he would reject her proposal and unite her with her true love, but was miserably cheated along with marriage between the two, causing Shreyas's mother to name her son after her former love in revenge. Following this revelation, Shreyas has a sudden change of attitude and returns to Pune with his changed plan. Meanwhile, Meenu's father discovers her relationship with Shreyas and forbids her from meeting him. However, Meenu escapes from home and decides to marry Shreyas, but he worriedly confesses to Meenu that he is not worthy of her, and requests her to leave him and find some suitable life partner for herself. Soon, a dejected Shreyas tries to board a train back to Mumbai, when Shirin arrives at the railway station on time and confronts him over his feelings, but Saai intervenes and teasingly announces that he will marry Shirin in Kolhapur. After his departure from the train, Shreyas encounters MK, a depressed alcoholic, whom he had previously met at a local bar. MK is seemingly trying to recover from the loss of his love and shockingly commits suicide by jumping out from the train right in front of the eyes of Shreyas.

After his dead body is recovered at the next railway station, Shreyas goes through MK's wallet in search of his family's contacts, when he is shocked to come across his mother's photograph in her youth, realising that MK was none other than his namesake and his mother's ex-lover, "Shreyas Gokhale". Shreyas cremates MK's dead body and overcomes his fear and hesitation to unite himself with Shirin, recalling MK's last words in the train that the world is full of love but one should be determined to successfully gain his love at any cost. On the day of Shirin and Saai's marriage, Shreyas arrives at the ceremony in Kolhapur and proposes to Shirin with a heavy heart, causing her father to furiously slap her and Saai to make his henchmen brutally attack Shreyas. However, Pritam, Digya and the reformed Ashkya motivate Shreyas to fight against Saai and his gang and they all manage to defeat Saai. Finally, Shreyas takes Shirin away with him from the marriage ceremony and the two get married. After a few days, Shirin falls pregnant with Shreyas' child and is aware that Shreyas is the patient of a terminal illness (probably blood cancer) and has only few months or a year to live. At this point, Shreyas expresses his last wish to Shirin that all his friends should reunite at their hangout each year on his birthday and recall his memories. The film moves back to the present and ends with a touching scene where Shirin, Pritam, Digya, Meenu and all the other friends, now in their early 50s, meet at the same hangout of their former college campus on Shreyas' birthday and express all their feelings for him.

== Cast ==
- Swapnil Joshi as Shreyas Talwalkar
- Ankush Chaudhari as Digambar Shankar Patil (DSP . Digya)
- Sai Tamhankar as Shirin Ghatge
- Urmila Kanitkar Kothare as Meenakshi Inamdar ( Meenu)
- Jitendra Joshi as Saainath Dedgaonkar as ( Sai)
- Sushant Shelar as Pritam Ghatge (Shirin's brother)
- Uday Sabnis as Inspector Ramesh Inamdar (Meenu's father)
- Uday Tikekar as Sudhir Talwalkar (Shreyas' father)
- Varsha Usgaonkar as Rani Patkar Talwalkar (Shreyas' mother)
- Sandeep Kulkarni as Shreyas Gokhale / MK (Rani's ex-lover)
- Nagesh Bhosale as Vinayakrao Ghatge (Shirin and Pritam's father)
- Shrirang Deshmukh as Diwakarrao Dedgaonkar (Saai's father)
- Richa Parayali as Surekha Bhate (Digya's lover)
- Sunil Godbole as Anna Bhate (Surekha's father)
- Yogesh Shirsat as Shree
- Nitesh Kalbande as Nitesh ( Nitya)
- Ajinkya Joshi as Ashok (Ashkya)
- Pranav Raorane as (Sunil (Bhonsale)
- Rajesh Bhosle as Umesh ( Umya)
- Anand Abhyankar as Dean of S. P. College (voiceover by Girish Oak)

== Production ==
The film was mainly shot in Pune. Director Sanjay Jadhav wanted to use real locations and originally planned to shoot in Sangli and Kolhapur, but due to budget issues, filming was shifted to the Agricultural College in Pune. With support from Nitesh Rane's initiative Maharashtra Kalanidhi and assistance from Videocon, the production was able to complete filming in Pune.

== Release ==
Duniyadari was released on 19 July 2013 in theatres across Maharashtra, Gujarat, Goa and Karnataka. The film had 140 screens across 110 theaters on its opening day, which surged to around 200 within three days following great demand. The film acclaimed great success in and outside Maharashtra, with a record 710 daily shows across 270 theatres.

The film was re-released on 27 May 2024.

== Soundtrack ==
No.	Title	Lyricist	Singer(s)	Length
1	"Zindagi Zindagi"		Sachin Pilgaonkar, Mahesh Manjrekar, Sumeet Raghavan, Sunil Barve, Prasad Oak, Kedar Shinde, Pandharinath Kamble, Siddharth Jadhav, Vaibhav Mangle, Ankush Choudhary, Swapnil Joshi	4:40
2	"Tik Tik Vajate"	Mangesh Kangane	Sonu Nigam, Sayali Pankaj	2:52
3	"Yara Yara"	Mangesh Kangane	Rohit Shyam Raut, Shikha Jain	3:21
4	"Deva Tujhya Gabharyala"		Adarsh Shinde, Kirti Killedar, Aanandi Joshi	4:34

== Reception ==
=== Critical reception ===
Aparna Phadke of The Times of India rated 3.0/5, praised Sanjay Jadhav's adeptness in crafting a friendship film, noting his success in portraying confusion, pathos, sacrifice, and the complexities of love effectively. However, he suggest that reducing the number of twists in the plot would make the film tighter and even more engaging for the audience. Saumitra Pote of Maharashtra Times rated 3/5 expressed that while the movie follows a predictable rhythm and achieves expected results, the ending is the only aspect that stands out as truly shocking. He feel that besides the main characters, the supporting cast seems one-dimensional, possibly due to neglect in costume design, which affects the emotional impact. However, despite these flaws, they still find the movie to be good overall, especially praised the quality of the songs.

=== Box office ===
The film collected ₹1.8 crore (US$190,000) in its opening weekend. It was earned ₹22 crore (US$2.3 million) in 45 days.

Duniyadari was a huge commercial success in Marathi film industry grossed over ₹32 crore (US$3.3 million) and become an all-time blockbuster.

== Accolades ==
Year	Ceremony	Category	Recipient	Result	Ref.
2014	51st Maharashtra State Film Awards	Best Special Appearance Actress	Sai Tamhankar	Won	
2014	51st Maharashtra State Film Awards	Best Screenplay	Chinmay Mandlekar	Won	
2014	51st Maharashtra State Film Awards	Best Costume And Styles	Harshada Khanvilkar; Promita Jadhav	Won	

Year	Award Name	Description	Lyricist	Film	Song
2014	Radio Mirchi Music Awards Marathi	Best Upcoming Lyricist	Mangesh Kangane	Duniyadari	Tik Tik Vajate
2014	Radio Mirchi Music Awards	Best album of the Year		Duniyadari	
2014	Maharashtracha Favorite Kon	Maharashtrache fav geet		Duniyadari	Tik Tik Vajate

== See also ==
- Highest grossing Marathi films
