= Sanjay Jadhav =

Indian film director

- picture of Sanjay jadhav from website sanjayjadhav.com
- Born: 18 July 1970 (age 56)
- Occupations: Cinematographer; film director; producer
- Years active: 2004–present
- Spouse: Promita Jadhav
- Website: imsanjayjadhav.com

Sanjay Jadhav (born 18 July 1970) is an Indian cinematographer and Marathi film director.

== Career ==
Jadhav is an Indian cinematographer and film director in Hindi and Marathi cinema, who is best known for his 2013 film, Duniyadari. The film was produced by the production house Dreaming24Seven along with Deepak Rane and was presented by Video Palace. In 2014, Jadhav directed Pyaar Vali Love Story, a romantic drama set in the 90s. He also directed the 2015 romantic drama film Tu Hi Re starring Swapnil Joshi, Sai Tamhankar and Tejaswini Pandit, as well as the 2016 action film Guru starring Ankush Chaudhari and Urmila Kanitkar. Jadhav has also produced several television shows, including Marathi sitcom Dil Dosti Duniyadari, aired on Zee Marathi, the thriller serial Duheri on Star Pravah, and a show called Freshers on Zee Yuva. He was recently a judge on the dance reality show 2 MAD, along with actress Amruta Khanvilkar and film choreographer Umesh Jadhav. He presently plays the role of a lawyer in the Marathi TV show Kaay Ghadla Tya Ratri?

In November 2023, he served as jury member at the 54th International Film Festival of India for Indian Panorama Feature Films section.

== Filmography ==
- All movies are in Marathi unless otherwise specified.

Key
†	Denotes films that have not yet been released

Year	Film	Director	Screenplay	Writer	Actor	Ref(s)
2008	Checkmate	Yes	No	Yes	No	
2010	Ringa Ringa	Yes	No	No	No	
2011	Fakta Ladh Mhana	Yes	No	No	No	
2013	Duniyadari	Yes	No	No	No	
2014	Pyaar Vali Love Story	Yes	No	Yes	No	
2015	Tu Hi Re	Yes	Yes	No	No	
2016	Guru	Yes	No	No	No	
2018	Ye Re Ye Re Paisa	Yes	No	Yes	No	
2018	Lagna Mubarak	No	No	No	Yes	
2019	Sur Sapata	No	No	No	Yes	
2019	Luckee	Yes	Yes	No	No	
2019	Khari Biscuit	Yes	No	No	No	
2021	Well Done Baby	No	No	No	Yes	
2022	Tamasha Live	Yes	No	Yes	No	
2025	Ye Re Ye Re Paisa 3	Yes	Yes	Yes	No	
TBA	Kalaawati †	Yes	No	No	No	
TBA	Duniyadari 2 †	Yes	No	No	No	

=== Cinematographer ===
Year	Film	Language	Notes
2004	Savarkhed: Ek Gaon	Marathi	
2004	Saatchya Aat Gharat	Marathi	
2005	Pak Pak Pakaak	Marathi	
2005	Dombivali Fast	Marathi	
2006	Aai Shappath..!	Marathi	
2007	Saade Maade Teen	Marathi	
2007	Evano Oruvan	Tamil	
2008	Checkmate	Marathi	
2008	Mumbai Meri Jaan	Hindi	
2008	C Kkompany	Hindi	
2009	Jogwa	Marathi	
2010	Khichdi: The Movie	Hindi	
2010	Ringa Ringa	Marathi	
2011	Stand By	Hindi	
2011	Zakaas	Marathi	
2011	Society Kaam Se Gayi	Hindi	
2011	Fakt Ladh Mhana	Marathi	
2012	Chintoo	Marathi	
2012	Aayna Ka Bayna	Marathi	
2014	A Rainy Day	Marathi	
2014	Pyaar Vali Love Story	Marathi	
2023	Ravrambha	Marathi	
2026	Punha Ekda Sade Made Teen	Marathi	
2026	Super Duperr	Marathi	

== Producer ==
- Dil Dosti Duniyadari Zee Marathi Serial
- Duheri Star Pravah Serial
- Freshers Zee Yuva Serial
- Anjali Zee Yuva Serial
