= Dhurala =

- Theatrical release poster
- Directed by: Sameer Vidwans
- Written by: Kshitij Patwardhan
- Produced by: Anish Jog
- Starring: Ankush Chaudhari; Alka Kubal; Sai Tamhankar; Siddhartha Jadhav; Sonalee Kulkarni
- Cinematography: Akash Agarwal
- Edited by: Faisal Mahadik
- Music by: AV Prafullachandra
- Production companies: Zee Studios; Pratisaad Production
- Release date: 3 January 2020
- Running time: 169 minutes
- Country: India
- Language: Marathi

Dhurala is a 2020 Indian Marathi-language political drama film directed by Sameer Vidwans. It stars an ensemble cast including starring Ankush Chaudhari, Alka Kubal, Sai Tamhankar, Siddhartha Jadhav, Sonalee Kulkarni, Amey Wagh, Umesh Kamat and Prasad Oak. The film is and written by Kshitij Patwardhan and revolves around the story of gram panchayat elections in a small village in Maharashtra.

== Plot ==
Ambegaon is a small village in Maharashtra and the sarpanch Nivrutti "Anna" Ubhe, of the gram panchayat, dies while the new elections are approaching. His eldest son Navnath "Dada" Ubhe runs their family business and considers himself as heir apparent for the sarpanch position and decides to run in the elections. Opposition leader, Harish Gadhwe, is furious over his last loss; but now thinks he has good chance of winning since Dada is new to politics. But the battle gets a new turn when MLA Prithviraj Shinde convinces Jyoti Tai Ubhe to also run in the elections as women empowerment is necessary at grassroot. Jyoti Tai is step-mother of Dada and their relationship has not been very cordial. Dada also inducts his wife Harshada in his newly formed party to give a female face to his team. Hanumantha, the second son of Anna, has a cement business. But his wife Monica sees the power-play going on in the family and persuades Hanumantha also to fight in the elections. The drama continues as the fight for the position intensifies and also disturbs their familial bond.

== Cast ==
- Ankush Chaudhari as Navnath "Dada" Ubhe, eldest son of Anna Ubhe
- Alka Kubal as Jyoti Tai Ubhe (Akka), second wife of Anna Ubhe
- Siddhartha Jadhav as Hanumantha Ubhe, second son of Anna Ubhe
- Amey Wagh as Nilesh Ubhe, youngest son of Anna Ubhe
- Sai Tamhankar as Harshada Ubhe, wife of Dada
- Sonalee Kulkarni as Monica Ubhe, wife of Hanumantha
- Umesh Kamat as Atul
- Prasad Oak as Harish Gadhwe
- Sunil Tawde as Baharmal Kaka
- Sulekha Talwalkar as Sunaina Babar
- Uday Sabnis as Prithviraj Shinde (Bhaiyyasaheb)
- Dnyanada Ramtirthkar as Divya Babar
- Prajakta Hanamghar as Lata Harish Gadhwe
- Priyadarshan Jadhav as PR person in Gadhwe team

== Production ==
The film is directed by Sameer Vidwans based on the story written by Kshitij Patwardhan. They both have earlier collaborated for films: Time Please (2013), Double Seat (2015), YZ (2016) and Mala Kahich Problem Nahi (2017). In 2013, the storyline was adapted as a play by Vidwans and Patwardhan and was presented under the title Saglech Ubhe Aahet. However, due to poor script writing and a low response from the audience, the play did not do well. The script was then re-written and presented in the film.

== Soundtrack ==
All music is composed by AV Prafullachandra.

No.	Title	Singer(s)	Length
1.	"Naad Kara"	Adarsh Shinde, Anand Shinde	2:53
2.	"Rada Dhurala"	Adarsh Shinde, Manish Rajgire, Rupali Moghe	4:07
3.	"Jalmachi Vaari"	Manish Rajgire, Sahil Kulkarni	3:28
4.	"Baari Baari"	Urmila Dhangar	3:10
5.	"Kaakana Kinkin"	Aanandi Joshi	4:04
Total length:			17:42

== Reception ==
=== Critical response ===
In their review, Maharashtra Times compared the films with older Marathi films based on politics like Sinhasan (1979), Vazir (1994), Sarkarnama (1998), Saubhagyavati Sarpanch (1999) and Sattadhish (2000) and appreciated the modernization of politics shown in the film while still keeping the major core same to the old one. The review by Madhura Nerurkar highlights the notable work done in story writing, dialogues, and Tamhankar's portrayal of her lead role. Lokmat compared the film with its play version released in 2013 and noted the tremendous improvement in storyline and scriptwriting.

At the Filmfare Marathi Awards, 2021, the film won seven awards from 16 nominations. Chaudhari won the award in Best Actor category and Tamhankar won award in Best Actress category. She shared the award with Neha Pendse for the film June. The Best Supporting Actor award was presented to Jadhav and Best Supporting Actress award to Kulkarni. She shared the award with Geetanjali Kulkarni for the film Karkhanisanchi Waari. Adarsh Shinde won the award for Best Playback Singer (Male) and AV Prafullachandra received it for Best Background Score. The award for Best Dialogues was shared by Irawati Karnik for Jhimma and Kshitij Patwardhan for Dhurala. The film also received three awards at Ma Ta Sanman ceremony, organized by Maharashtra Times in March 2022.

== Awards and nominations ==
Year	Awards	Category	Recipient	Result	Notes
2021	Filmfare Marathi Awards	Best Film	Dhurala	Nominated	
2021	Filmfare Marathi Awards	Best Director	Sameer Vidhwans	Nominated	
2021	Filmfare Marathi Awards	Best Actor	Ankush Chaudhari	Won	
2021	Filmfare Marathi Awards	Best Actress	Sai Tamhankar	Won	Shared with Neha Pendse (film June)
2021	Filmfare Marathi Awards	Best Supporting Actor	Siddhartha Jadhav	Won	
2021	Filmfare Marathi Awards	Best Supporting Actress	Sonalee Kulkarni	Won	Shared with Geetanjali Kulkarni (film Karkhanisanchi Waari)
2021	Filmfare Marathi Awards	Best Supporting Actress	Alka Kubal	Nominated	
2021	Filmfare Marathi Awards	Best Music Album	AV Prafullachandra	Nominated	
2021	Filmfare Marathi Awards	Best Playback Singer (Male)	Adarsh Shinde	Won	For the song "Rada Dhurala"
2021	Filmfare Marathi Awards	Best Background Score	AV Prafullachandra	Won	
2021	Filmfare Marathi Awards	Best Story	Kshitij Patwardhan	Nominated	
2021	Filmfare Marathi Awards	Best Dialogues	Kshitij Patwardhan	Won	Shared with Irawati Karnik (film Jhimma)
2021	Filmfare Marathi Awards	Best Production Design	Nilesh Wagh	Nominated	
2021	Filmfare Marathi Awards	Best Cinematography	Akash Agarwal	Nominated	
2021	Filmfare Marathi Awards	Best Editing	Faisal Imran	Nominated	
2021	Filmfare Marathi Awards	Best Sound Design	Avinash Sonawane	Nominated	
2022	Ma Ta Sanmaan	Best Film	Dhurala	Won	Shared with film Dithee
2022	Ma Ta Sanmaan	Best Actor	Ankush Chaudhari	Won	Shared with Kishor Kadam (film Dithee)
2022	Ma Ta Sanmaan	Best Supporting Actor	Siddhartha Jadhav	Won	
