= Kshitij Patwardhan =

Indian screenwriter and theatre director

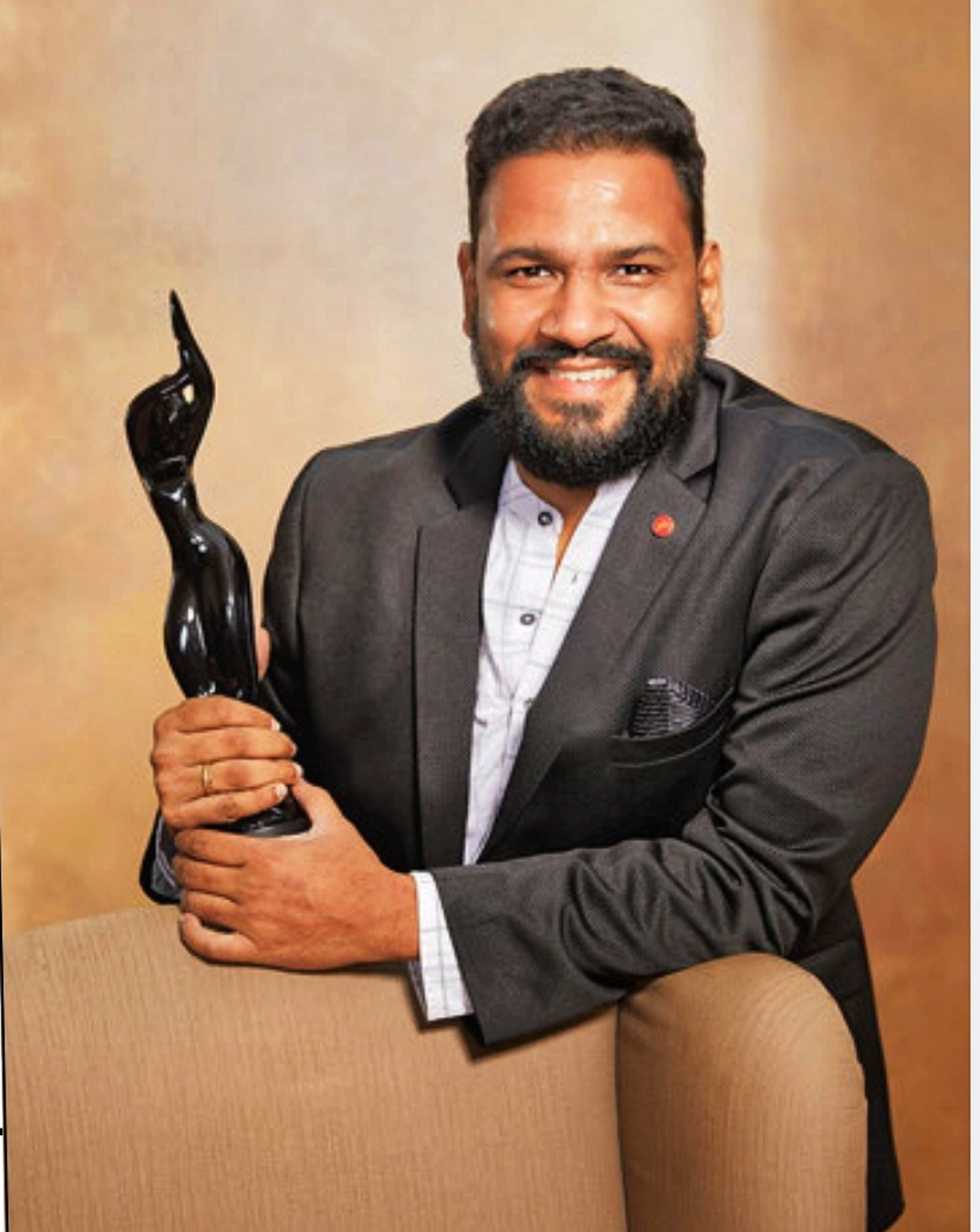
- Born: 11 January 1985 (age 41)
- Education: Bharat Marathi Vidyalaya; Abhinav Marathi Vidyalaya
- Occupations: Director; screenwriter; playwright; lyricist
- Writing career
- Language: Marathi Hindi English
- Notable works: Uttar; Faster Fene; Double Seat
- Website: www.kshitijpatwardhan.in

Kshitij Patwardhan (born 11 January 1985) is an Indian screenwriter, lyricist, playwright and film director who works in Marathi and Hindi cinema He has written screenplays, dialogues, lyrics for films including Double Seat, YZ (film), Faster Fene, Dhurala, Singham Again and Eetha. He received the Filmfare Award for Best Screenplay in 2018, Filmfare Award for Best Lyricist in 2020, and Filmfare Award for Best Dialogue – Marathi for Dhurala. He is also the recipient of multiple Maharashtra State Film Awards, Zee Gaurav Puraskar, MIFTA and Star Pravah Ratna.

== Early life ==
Patwardhan was born in Pune, Maharashtra. He studied in Bharat Marathi Vidyalaya and Abhinav Marathi Vidyalaya. He completed a bachelor's degree in computer science and a master's degree in communication and journalism. During his career in advertising, he received the United Nations Population Fund (UNFPA) - Laadli National Award for Creative Excellence for Social Change for a print advertisement addressing sex selection. He won this award again for a Hindi song that he wrote.

== Theatre ==
Patwardhan wrote his first Marathi commercial play, Nava Gadi Nava Rajya, which ran for 475 performances. The production received several awards.

In 2015, he adapted a short story by Hanumant Moreshwar Marathe into the play Don Special. The play ran for 225 performances and received several awards.

He later wrote and directed Aajjibai Jorat, a Marathi Children's play created using artificial intelligence, featuring Nirmiti Sawant and Abhinay Berde.

He also wrote the Marathi theatre play Bhumika starring Sachin Khedekar, The play has completed more than 175 performances.

== Films and series ==
Patwardhan's made his screenwriting debut with Aaghat (2010), which he wrote with Sameer Vidwans. He then wrote the dialogue of Satrangi Re.

His subsequent film credits include Time Please, Lagna Pahave Karun, Timepass 2 ,Classmates, and Double Seat. He wrote the screenplay and dialogues for Classmates (2015 film) and developed the story and screenplay for Double Seat.

In 2016, he wrote the screenplay for YZ. In 2017, he co-created Faster Fene with director Aditya Sarpotdar, His subsequent credits include, Mauli (2018), Dhurala (2020), Taali (2023), Singham Again (2024), Sajini Shinde Ka Viral Video (2023) and Eetha (2026), He made his directorial debut Uttar (film), for which he wrote the screenplay, dialogues, and song lyrics.

== Songs ==
Patwardhan has written lyrics for Marathi and Hindi films. His credit include "Dhaga Dhaga" from Daagdi Chaawl, "Awaz vadav DJ" from Poshter Girl, "Mohini" from Double Seat, and "Aaya re Toofan" from Chhaava. He also wrote Hindi versionFor the Hindi-dubbed version of the Marathi film Ved he wrote the Hindi lyrics for the dubbed version of Ved (film), including "Phisal Jaa tu" and "Mila tu" from Haseen Dillruba, and songs for musical film Rocket Gang, and Half Ticket.

== Advertising ==
Before working primarily in fillms and theatre, Patwardhan worked in advertising. His advertising work included campaigns for the Pro Kabaddi League, Cadbury Dairy Milk, Chitale Bandhu Mithaiwale, Saraswat Co-operative Bank, and Buldana Urban Cooperative Credit Society.

== Publishing ==
In 2017, Patwardhan produced and published an illustrated novel in Marathi called Darya. It was written by his brother Vikram Patwardhan.

== Filmography ==
=== As screenwriter and director ===
Year	Name	Writer	Director	Ref.
2026	Eetha	Yes		
2025	Uttar	Yes	Yes	
2024	Singham Again	Yes		
2023	Taali	Yes		
2023	Sajini Shinde Ka Viral Video	Yes		
2020	Dhurala	Yes		
2018	Mauli	Yes		
2017	Faster Fene	Yes		
2016	YZ	Yes		
2015	Classmates	Yes		
2015	Double Seat	Yes		
2015	Timepass 2	Yes		
2013	Lagna Pahave Karun	Yes		
2013	Time Please	Yes		
2012	Satrangi Re	Yes		
2010	Aaghaat	Yes		

=== As lyricist ===
Year	Film	Songs	Ref.
2026	Ranabaali	"O Mere Saajan" "Garjana" "Dhairya Dena" "Ranabaali Aa Ja"	
2026	Gondhal	"Chandani" (Hindi Version)	
2026	Adkitta	"Baby Bomb" "Gheun Ye" "Mann Dhavate" "Chandawa"	
2025	Uttar (film)	"Ho Aai" "Asen Mi"	
2025	Asambhav	All songs	
2025	Chhaava	"Aaya Re Toofan" "Rudra"	Co-lyricist for "Aaya Re Toofan" with Irshad Kamil
2025	Ashi Hi Jamva Jamvi	"Mastikhor" "Phulala Phul"	
2024	Like Aani Subscribe	"Limbu Firawla"	
2023	Jhimma 2	"Marathi Pori" "Butti Maar" "Punha Jhimma" "Ranga Jarasa Ola"	
2022	Rocket Gang	"Hawaon Mein" "Har Baccha Hai Rocket" "Duniya hai maa ki godi me"	
2022	Daagadi Chawl 2	"Raghu Pinjryat Aala" "Mann Dhaga Dhaga" "Samjun Ghena" "Sangava Aalaya"	
2021	Haseen Dillruba	"Phisal Jaa Tu" "Mila Tu"	
2021	Jhimma	"Jhimma Title Song" "Maze Gaon" "Alvida"	
2020	Kesari	"Rujala"	
2020	Dhurala	"Rada Dhurala" "Jalmachi Vaari" "Baari Baari"	
2020	Mann Fakiraa	"Ghari Gondhal"	
2019	Khari Biscuit	"Khari" "Tula Japnar Ahe"	
2019	Girlfriend	"Love Story" "Kode Sope Thode" "Querida Querido" "Nacha Got A Girlfriend"	
2019	Ye Re Ye Re Paisa 2	"Paisa Paisa" "Un dos Tres"	
2018	Ani Dr. Kashinath Ghanekar	"Katarweli"	
2018	Youngraad	"Vay Youngraad Zhalay" "Saye"	
2018	Barayan	"Charger Laav"	
2018	Farzand	"Tumhi Yetana Kela Eshara"	
2017	Deva	"Roj Roj Navyane" "Lamana" "Deva Anthem"	
2017	Baapjanma	"Man Shevantiche Phool" "Gandha Ajunahi"	
2017	Fugay	"Party De"	
2017	Baghtos Kay Mujra Kar	"Ti Talwar" "Tu Disate" "Majhya Raja Ra" "Gavran Kombda"	
2016	Poshter Girl	"Awaaj Vadhav DJ" "Simple Dimple"	
2016	Half Ticket	"Chal Chal Chal Chal" "Rubab Pahije" "Bharle Re" "Labbad Gabbad"	
2016	YZ	"Aare Krishna Aare Kanha" "O Kaka" "Priyakara" "Michi Maja Vyalo"	
2015	Daagdi Chaawl	"Dhaga Dhaga"	
2015	Classmates	"Saang Na" "Aala Re Raja" "Swapna Chalun Aale"	
2015	Double Seat	"Mohini"	
2015	Timepass 2	"Dagadu Savdhan"	
2014	Bhatukali	"Tara Tara"	
2013	Time Please	"Nava Gadi Ana Rajya Nava" "Aas Tu" "Kadhi Na Kadhi" "Butterfly Man"	

== Plays ==
=== As director and writer ===
Name	Year	Writer	Director
Nava Gadi Nava Rajya	2010	Yes	
Don Special	2015	Yes	Yes
Aaji Bai Jorat	2024	Yes	Yes
Bhumika	2025	Yes	

== Awards ==
Year	Award	Category	Work	Result	Ref.
2011	MIFTA	Best Playwright	Nava Gadi Nava Rajya	Won	
2015	IMFFA	Best Screenplay and Dialogues	Classmates	Won	
2015	Zee Gaurav Award	Best Theatre Director	Don Special	Won	
2016	Maharashtra State Award	Best Screenplay and Dialogues	Double Seat	Won	
2016	Master Dinanath Mangeshkar Sanman		Don Special	Won	
2018	Filmfare Marathi Awards	Filmfare Award for Best Screenplay – Marathi	Faster Fene	Won	
2019	Sakal Premier	Best Lyricist	"Tula Japnar Ahe"	Won	
2020	Filmfare Marathi Awards	Filmfare Award for Best Lyricist – Marathi	"Tula Japnar Aahe" – Khari Biscuit	Won	
2015	Filmfare Marathi Awards	Filmfare Award for Best Lyricist – Marathi	"Man Dhaga Dhaga" from Dagadi Chawl	Nominated	
2015	Filmfare Marathi Awards	Filmfare Award for Best Lyricist – Marathi	"Ritya Sarya Disha" from Double Seat	Nominated	
2016	Filmfare Marathi Awards	Filmfare Award for Best Lyricist – Marathi	"Rubaab Pahije" – Half Ticket	Nominated	
2020	Filmfare Marathi Awards	Filmfare Award for Best Lyricist – Marathi	"Kode Sope Thode" – Girlfriend	Nominated	
2021	Filmfare Marathi Awards	Filmfare Award for Best Lyricist – Marathi	"Alvida" – Jhimma	Nominated	
2023	Filmfare Marathi Awards	Filmfare Award for Best Lyricist – Marathi	"Rang Jarasa Ola" – Jhimma 2	Nominated	
2026	Filmfare Marathi Awards	Filmfare Award for Best Lyricist – Marathi	"Asen Mi" from Uttar (film)	Nominated	
2026	Filmfare Marathi Awards	Filmfare Award for Best Lyricist – Marathi	"Dis Sarale" from Fussclass Dabhade	Nominated	
2024	Zee Chitra Gaurav Puraskar	Zee Chitra Gaurav Puraskar for Best Lyricist	"Yeda Mandola" – Unaad	Won	
2024	Zee Chitra Gaurav Puraskar	Zee Chitra Gaurav Puraskar for Best Lyricist	"Marathi Pori" – Jhimma 2	Nominated	
2025	Chaitraban Puraskar	For overall contribution to the field		Won	
2026	Filmfare Awards Marathi	Filmfare Award for Best Story – Marathi	Uttar (film)	Nominated	
2026	36th Maharashtra State Marathi Professional Theatre Competition	Best Writer	Bhumika Play	Won	
2026	Ma Ta Sanmaan	Best Writer	Bhumika Play	Won	
