= Mala Kahich Problem Nahi =

- Directed by: Sameer Vidwans
- Starring: Gashmeer Mahajani; Spruha Joshi; Nirmiti Sawant; Kamlesh Sawant
- Release date: 11 August 2017
- Country: India
- Language: Marathi

Mala Kahich Problem Nahi (transl. I have no problem) is a 2017 Indian Marathi-language drama film directed by Sameer Vidwans and produced by Torque, Filmykeeda Productions. The film stars Gashmeer Mahajani, Spruha Joshi, Nirmiti Sawant and Kamlesh Sawant. It was released on 11 August 2017.

== Synopsis ==
Ajay and Ketaki decide to get married in court after the constant clashes of egos between their respective families. Things complicate after their routine lives take a toll on their relationship.

== Cast ==
- Gashmeer Mahajani
- Spruha Joshi
- Nirmiti Sawant
- Kamlesh Sawant
- Vijay Nikam
- Mangal Kenkare
- Sahil Koparde
- Seema Deshmukh
- Arash Godbole
- Snehlata Vasayikar
- Satish Alekar

== Release ==
The film was theatrically released on 11 August 2017. Previously it was set to be released on 28 July 2017.

== Soundtrack ==
Mala Kahich Problem Nahi

Soundtrack album by Saurabh Bhalerao, Hrishikesh Datar, Jasraj Joshi
- Released: 2017
- Recorded: 2017
- Genre: Feature film soundtrack
- Length: 19:18
- Language: Marathi

Official audio
- Mala Kahich Problem Nahi – Full Album on YouTube

Track listing
| No. | Title | Singer(s) | Length |
|---|---|---|---|
| 1. | "Gaaz Yeto Go" | Bela Shende | 3:42 |
| 2. | "Tujyasathi" | Aanandi Joshi, Jasraj Jayant Joshi | 3:55 |
| 3. | "Virlya Kevha" | Abhay Jodhpurkar, Priyanka Barve | 4:32 |
| 4. | "Maunatuni" | Jasraj Jayant Joshi, Shruti Athavale, Jasraj Joshi | 3:32 |
| 5. | "Mala Kahich Problem Nahi" | Avadhoot Gupte and Neeti Mohan | 4:17 |
| Total length: | | | 19:18 |

== Reception ==
Ganesh Matkari of Pune Mirror wrote: "The credit should go to the actor as well as the director, Sameer Vidwans. After three well-crafted films, MKPN marks a slight but not serious dip in Vidwans’s career, in a film that shows us his craftsmanship but falls short when delivering the content".

Suparna Thombre of Cinestaan.com wrote: "In the last scene, the camera zooms out on Ajay and Ketaki, who are sharing a laugh and a drink, and continues to zoom out of the skyscraper to an aerial view of Mumbai — a metaphor for this being just one of the innumerable urban couples trying to navigate their relationship in a big city. For that reason alone, this film will resonate with many".

A reviewer of Loksatta wrote: "This is a film that tries to present this very important topic related to today's generation in a thoughtful way".

Mukund Kule of Maharashtra Times said: "All the actors in the movie have done a great job. Spruha Joshi has done a convincing job as always. But Gashmir's subdued-looking Ajay is better. Nirvana Sawant, Vijay Nikam, Mangal Kenkare, Satish Alekar, Seema Deshmukh are all renowned actors. So the acting side is great. The photography-music side is also fine".
