= Pudachi Vadi =

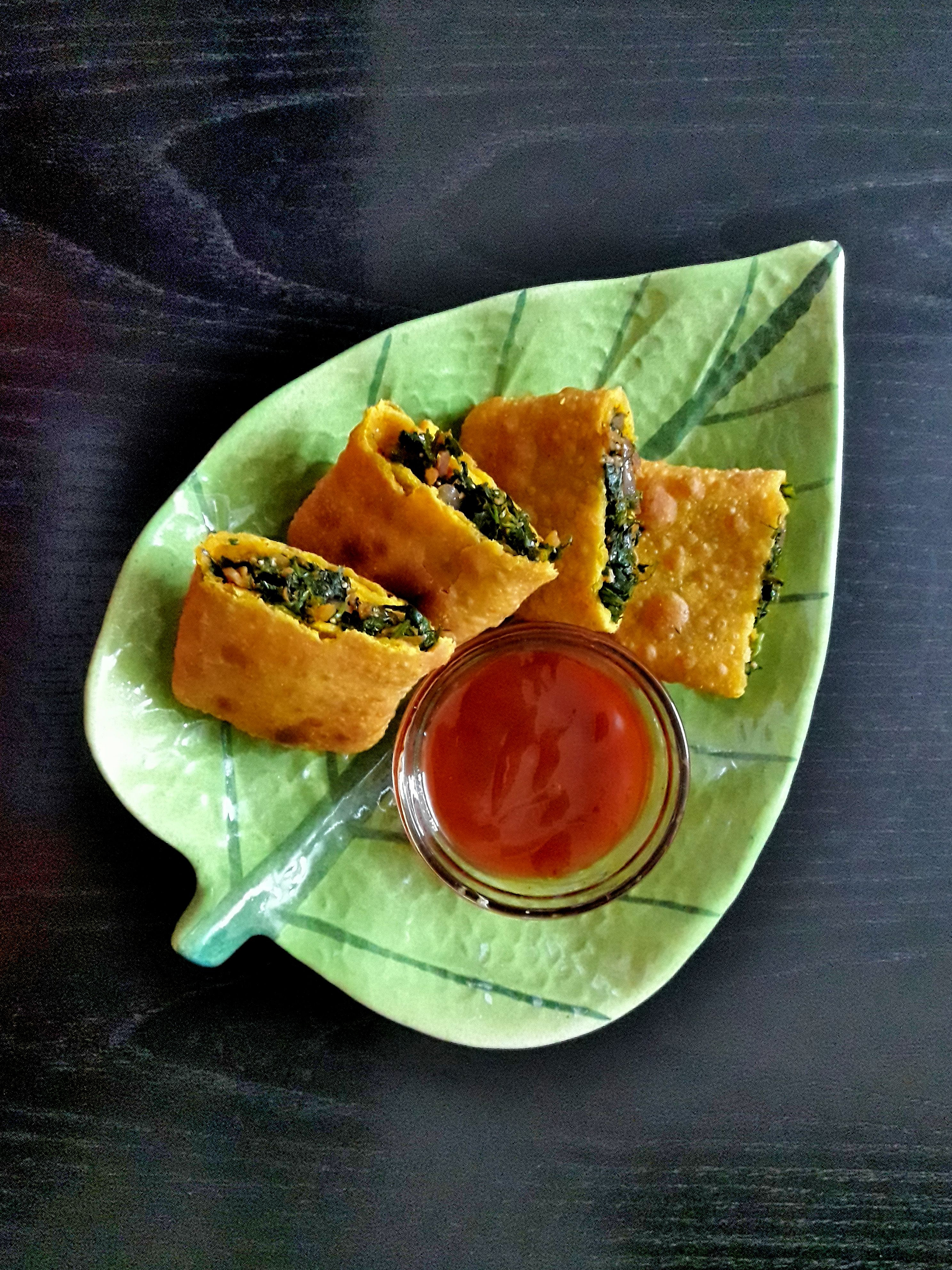
- Alternative names: Sambarvadi
- Type: Snack
- Place of origin: India
- Region or state: Maharashtra
- Main ingredients: Gram flour, coconut, coriander, chili powder, and Indian spices

Pudachi Vadi, also known as Sambarvadi, is a deep-fried snack in the eastern parts of the Maharashtra state of India. The name refers to the fact that the snack is folded like a packet.

== Description ==
Pudachi vadi has an outer covering of Gram flour and is filled with a mixture that can include dried grated coconut, coriander, chili powder, onion, poppy seeds, and Indian spices. It is deep-fried and very crispy.

In the Vidarbha region, the snack tends to be sweet; in the Kolhapur region, it tends to be spicier.

== Availability ==
The dish is often made during winter, as that is when coriander is most available.

In Pune, pudachi vadi is available at Chitale Bandhu Mithaiwale. They have several shops in Pune including in Deccan Gymkhana and on Laxmi Road.

In Kolhapur, there are many places where you get Pudachi Vadi but the most famous place is Gruhini Vastu Bhandar. Gruhini has two branches in the city, one in Shahupuri and the other on Mahadwar Road.
