= Sur Nava Dhyas Nava =

Indian Marathi language Reality show

- Genre: Reality television
- Created by: Viacom18
- Presented by: Tejashri Pradhan (2017-2018); Spruha Joshi (2018-2022); Rasika Sunil (2023)
- Judges: Avadhoot Gupte (2017-2023); Shalmali Kholgade (2018-2019); Mahesh Kale (2017-2023)
- Opening theme: "Sur Nava Dhyas Nava" by Shalmali Kholgade; Avadhoot Gupte; Mahesh Kale
- Country of origin: India
- Original language: Marathi
- No. of seasons: 6
- No. of episodes: 285

Production
- Producer: Avinash Bhanushali
- Production location: Mumbai
- Camera setup: Multi-camera
- Running time: 45-60 minutes
- Production company: Purple Patch Mediaz

Original release
- Network: Colors Marathi
- Release: 13 November 2017 – 31 December 2023

Sur Nava Dhyas Nava (transl. New Tune New Obsession) is an Indian Marathi language singing reality show which is airing on Colors Marathi. It premiered from 13 November 2017 with airing 6 seasons.

== Season summary ==
Year	Season	Host	Judge	Winner	Runner-up
2017-2018	Season 1	Tejashri Pradhan; Pushkaraj Chirputkar	Avadhoot Gupte; Mahesh Kale; Shalmali Kholgade	Aniruddha Joshi	Vishwajeet Borwankar
2018-2019	Chhote Surveer	Spruha Joshi	Avadhoot Gupte; Mahesh Kale; Shalmali Kholgade	Swarali Jadhav	Meera Nilakhe
2019-2020	Season 3	Spruha Joshi; Pushkar Jog	Avadhoot Gupte; Mahesh Kale	Akshaya Iyer	Raju Nadaf
2021	Asha Udyachi (Ladies Special)	Spruha Joshi	Avadhoot Gupte; Mahesh Kale	Sanmita Dhapte-Shinde	Sampada Mane
2022	Parva Ganyache, Marathi Banyache	Spruha Joshi	Avadhoot Gupte; Mahesh Kale	Utkarsh Wankhede	Sanjyoti Jagdale
2023	Aavaj Tarunaicha	Rasika Sunil	Avadhoot Gupte; Mahesh Kale	Gopal Gavande	Antara Kulkarni

== Season 1 ==
Sur Nava Dhyas Nava
- Season 1
- Hosted by: Tejashri Pradhan; Pushkaraj Chirputkar
- Judges: Avadhoot Gupte; Mahesh Kale; Shalmali Kholgade
- No. of contestants: 15
- Winner: Aniruddh Joshi
- Runner-up: Vishwajeet Borwankar
- No. of episodes: 59

Release
- Original network: Colors Marathi
- Original release: 13 November 2017 – 8 April 2018

First season started on 17 November 2017. This season was hosted Tejashri Pradhan & Pushkaraj Chirputkar. The winner of title of the show was Aniruddha Joshi.

=== Team Leaders ===
- Avadhoot Gupte
- Mahesh Kale
- Shalmali Kholgade

=== Teams ===
Avadhoot Team:

- Nihira Joshi
- Shamika Bhide
- Jitendra Tupe
- Shrirang Bhave
- Dipika Jog-Datar
- Shrinidhi Ghatate (Wild Card)

Mahesh Team:

- Aniruddh Joshi
- Madhura Kumbhar
- Vaishali Mhade
- Pralhad Jadhav
- Dnyaneshwar Meshram
- Vishwajeet Borwankar (Wild Card)

Shalmali Team:

- Sharayu Date
- Prasenjit Kosambi
- Jaydeep Bagwadkar
- Juiliee Jogalekar
- Padmanabh Gaikwad

=== Contestants ===
Sr. No.	Contestants	Team	Status
C1	Aniruddha Joshi	Mahesh Team	Winner
C2	Vishwajeet Borwankar	Mahesh Team	1st Runner-up
C3	Sharayu Date	Shalmali Team	2nd Runner-up
C4	Prasenjeet Kosambi	Shalmali Team	3rd Runner-up
C5	Nihira Joshi	Avadhoot Team	4th Runner-up
C6	Shrinidhi Ghatate	Avadhoot Team	Eliminated
C7	Madhura Kumbhar	Mahesh Team	Eliminated
C8	Jaydeep Bagwadkar	Shalmali Team	Eliminated
C9	Vaishali Mhade	Mahesh Team	Quit
C10	Juilee Joglekar	Shalmali Team	Eliminated
C11	Shamika Bhide	Avadhoot Team	Eliminated
C12	Jitendra Tupe	Avadhoot Team	Eliminated
C13	Padmanabh Gaikwad	Shalmali Team	Eliminated
C14	Pralhad Jadhav	Mahesh Team	Eliminated
C15	Dnyaneshwar Meshram	Mahesh Team	Eliminated
C16	Shrirang Bhave	Avadhoot Team	Eliminated
C17	Dipika Jog-Datar	Avadhoot Team	Eliminated

=== Guests ===
- Shounak Abhisheki
- Anand Shinde
- Sadhana Sargam
- Suresh Wadkar
- Taufiq Qureshi
- Ankush Chaudhari
- Sandeep Khare
- Salil Kulkarni
- Hridaynath Mangeshkar
- Vijay Chavan
- Pyarelal
- Veena Jagtap
- Sachit Patil
- Kavita Lad
- Akshaya Gurav
- Vijay Kathin
- Shrinidhi Ghatate
- Nana Patekar
- Sumeet Raghavan
- Sai Tamhankar
- Swapnil Bandodkar
- Vaishali Samant
- Bhagyashree Limaye
- Sukanya Kulkarni
- Atisha Naik
- Ashutosh Gowariker
- Vaibhav Tatwawaadi
- Vandana Gupte
- Shridhar Phadke
- Rani Mukerji
- Sudesh Bhosle
- Hridaynath Mangeshkar
- Sachin Pilgaonkar

== Season 2 - Chhote Surveer ==
Sur Nava Dhyas Nava
- Season 2
- Presented by: Spruha Joshi
- Judges: Avadhoot Gupte; Mahesh Kale; Shalmali Kholgade
- Winner: Swarali Jadhav
- Runner-up: Meera Nilakhe
- No. of episodes: 76

Release
- Original network: Colors Marathi
- Original release: 6 August 2018 – 3 April 2019

Sur Nava Dhyas Nava - Chhote Surveer was started on 6 August 2018. This season was hosted by Spruha Joshi. The winner of title of the show was Swarali Jadhav.

=== Contestants ===
Sr. No.	Contestants	Team	Status
C1	Swarali Jadhav	Mahesh Team	Winner
C2	Meera Nilakhe	Shalmali Team	1st Runner-up
C3	Anshika Chonkar	Shalmali Team	2nd Runner-up
C4	Saee Joshi	Avadhoot Team	3rd Runner-up
C5	Chaitanya Devdhe	Avadhoot Team	4th Runner-up
C6	Utkarsh Wankhede	Mahesh Team	Eliminated
C7	Saksham Sonawane	Shalmali Team	Eliminated
C8	Neha Kene	Avadhoot Team	Eliminated
C9	Vishwaja Jadhav	Shalmali Team	Eliminated
C10	Srushti Pagare	Avadhoot Team	Eliminated
C11	Sahil Pandhare	Avadhoot Team	Eliminated
C12	Abhishek Kamble	Mahesh Team	Eliminated
C13	Aadi Bhartiya	Mahesh Team	Eliminated
C14	Tanmayi Ghadge	Shalmali Team	Eliminated
C15	Gauri Gosavi	Mahesh Team	Eliminated
C16	Nandini Gaikwad	None	Eliminated
C17	Mithila Mali	None	Eliminated
C18	Swarang Watve	None	Eliminated
C19	Omkar Kanitkar	None	Eliminated
C20	Avani Ranade	None	Eliminated
C21	Rashi Pagare	None	Eliminated

=== Guests ===
Date	Guest	Featured
8 October 2018	Swapnil Bandodkar	Guest appearance
16-17 October 2018	Mahesh Manjrekar	Legend Special
16-17 October 2018	Ashok Saraf	Legend Special
22-23 October 2018	Sachin Pilgaonkar	Legend Special
31 October 2018	Kedar Shinde	Special appearance
7 November 2018	Sumeet Raghavan	Special appearance
20 November 2018	Anand Madgulkar	Special appearance
26-27 November 2018	Sandeep Khare	Special appearance
26-27 November 2018	Saleel Kulkarni	Special appearance
4 December 2018	Anand Shinde	Special appearance
10 December 2018	Riteish Deshmukh	Promotion of "Mauli"
1-2 January 2019	Mahesh Manjrekar	Promotion of "Bhai: Vyakti Ki Valli"
1-2 January 2019	Sachin Khedekar	Promotion of "Bhai: Vyakti Ki Valli"
1-2 January 2019	Sagar Deshmukh	Promotion of "Bhai: Vyakti Ki Valli"
14-15 January 2019	Pyarelal	Guest appearance
22 January 2019	Amrita Rao	Promotion of "Thackeray"
22 January 2019	Sanjay Raut	Promotion of "Thackeray"
22 January 2019	Rohan-Rohan	Promotion of "Thackeray"
22 January 2019	Nakash Aziz	Promotion of "Thackeray"
Grand Finale	Asha Bhosle	Special appearance

== Season 3 ==
Sur Nava Dhyas Nava
- Season 3
- Presented by: Spruha Joshi; Pushkar Jog
- Judges: Avadhoot Gupte; Mahesh Kale
- Winner: Akshaya Iyer
- Runner-up: Amol Ghodke
- No. of episodes: 60

Release
- Original network: Colors Marathi
- Original release: 9 September 2019 – 8 March 2020

Sur Nava Dhyas Nava 3 was started on 9 September 2019. This season was hosted by Spruha Joshi & Pushkar Jog. The winner of title of the show was Akshaya Iyer.

=== Contestants ===
Sr. No.	Contestants	Status
C1	Akshaya Iyer	Winner
C2	Raju Nadaf	1st Runner-up
C3	Swarali Jadhav	2nd Runner-up
C4	Amol Ghodke	3rd Runner-up
C5	Ravindra Khomane	4th Runner-up
C6	Shravani Wagle	5th Runner-up
C7	Vicky Kadam	Eliminated; Re-entered; Re-Eliminated
C8	Kanakshree	Eliminated
C9	Munawar Ali	Eliminated
C10	Prashant Kalundrekar	Eliminated
C11	Tejaswi Singh	Eliminated
C12	Nisha Shinde-Temkar	Eliminated
C13	Akash Godambe	Eliminated
C14	Rajeshwari Pawar	Eliminated
C15	Ram Pandit	Eliminated
C16	Madhura Deshpande	Eliminated
C17	Tejashri Deshpande	Eliminated
C18	Harshad Golesar	Eliminated
C19	Medha Paranjape	Eliminated
C20	Suraj Barkuntwad	Eliminated
C21	Rasika Janorkar	Eliminated
C22	Prasad Ulande	Eliminated

== Season 4 - Asha Udyachi ==
Sur Nava Dhyas Nava
- Season 4
- Presented by: Spruha Joshi
- Judges: Avadhoot Gupte; Mahesh Kale
- Winner: Sanmita Dhapte-Shinde
- Runner-up: Sampada Mane
- No. of episodes: 32

Release
- Original network: Colors Marathi
- Original release: 5 April – 13 June 2021

Sur Nava Dhyas Nava - Asha Udyachi was started on 5 April 2021. This season was hosted by Spruha Joshi. It is ladies special season. The winner of title of the show was Sanmita Dhapte-Shinde.

=== Contestants ===
Sr. No.	Contestants	Status
C1	Sanmita Dhapte–Shinde	Winner
C2	Sampada Mane	1st Runner-up
C3	Radha Khude	2nd Runner-up
C4	Rashmi Moghe	3rd Runner-up
C5	Pradnya Sane	4th Runner-up
C6	Shrinidhi Deshpande	5th Runner-up
C7	Dhanashree Korgaonkar	Eliminated
C8	Ishani Patankar	Eliminated
C9	Kishori Murke	Eliminated
C10	Malvika Dixit	Eliminated
C11	Hetvi Sethia-Vishwa	Eliminated
C12	Trupti Damle	Eliminated
C13	Snehal Chavan	Eliminated
C14	Shweta Dandekar	Eliminated
C15	Farin Shaikh	Eliminated
C16	Madhavi Mali	Eliminated

== Season 5 - Parv Ganyache Marathi Banyache ==
Sur Nava Dhyas Nava
- Season 5
- Presented by: Spruha Joshi
- Judges: Avadhoot Gupte; Mahesh Kale
- Winner: Utkarsh Wankhede
- Runner-up: Sanjyoti Jagdale
- No. of episodes: 32

Release
- Original network: Colors Marathi
- Original release: 1 July – 25 September 2022

Sur Nava Dhyas Nava Season 5 was started on 1 July 2022 and ended on 25 September 2022. This season was hosted by Spruha Joshi.

== Season 6 - Aavaj Tarunaicha ==
Sur Nava Dhyas Nava
- Season 6
- Presented by: Rasika Sunil
- Judges: Avadhoot Gupte; Mahesh Kale
- Winner: Gopal Gawande
- Runners-up: Antara Kulkarni & Animesh Thakur

Release
- Original network: Colors Marathi
- Original release: 7 October – 31 December 2023

Sur Nava Dhyas Nava Season 6 premiered from 7 October 2023. This season was hosted by Rasika Sunil.
