= Shameeka =

Shameeka is a given name and may also be spelled Shameka or Shamika. Notable people with the name include:

- Shamika Bhide (born 1994), Indian musical artist
- Shameka Christon (born 1982), American basketball player
- Shamika Cotton, American actress
- Shameeka Fishley (born 1993), English footballer
- Shameka Marshall (born 1983), American long jumper

== See also ==
- "Shameika", a song by Fiona Apple from the album Fetch the Bolt Cutters
