= Zee Chitra Gaurav Puraskar for Best Lyricist =

Award in India

- Awarded for: Best Performance by a Lyricist
- Country: India
- Presented by: Zee Marathi
- First award: Sanjay Patil, "Jeev Rangla"; Jogwa (2009)
- Currently held by: Jitendra Joshi "Khal Khal Goda"; Godavari (2024)

The Zee Chitra Gaurav Puraskar for Best Lyricist is presented by Zee Marathi as part of its annual Zee Chitra Gaurav Puraskar, for best lyrics written by a lyricist in Marathi films, who are selected by the jury. Guru Thakur has won most awards in this category.

== Awards ==
Year	Lyricist	Song	Film	Ref.
2008	Sandeep Khare	"Rani Majhya Malyamandi"	Tula Shikwin Changlach Dhada	
2009	Sanjay Patil	"Jeev Rangla"	Jogwa	
2010	Guru Thakur	"Khel Mandala"	Natarang	
2011	Guru Thakur	"Kalala Na Kadhi Usavala"	Shikshanachya Aaicha Gho	
2012	Sudhir Moghe	"Deva Tula Shodhu Kutha"	Deool	
2013	Dasu Vaidya	"Ganya Manya Tuka"	Tukaram	
2014	Ajay Naik	"Janta Ajanta"	Lagna Pahave Karun	
2015	Guru Thakur	"Maauli Maauli"	Lai Bhaari	
2016	Mangesh Kangane	"Sur Niragas Ho"	Katyar Kaljat Ghusali	
2017	Sameer Samant	"Hich Amuchi Prarthana"	Ubuntu	
2018	Vaibhav Joshi	"Muramba"	Muramba	
2019	Sayali Khare	"Dis Yeti"	Nude	
2020	Vaibhav Joshi	"Anandghan"	Anandi Gopal	
2021	Not Awarded			
2022	Ajay-Atul	"Yad Lagla"	Sairat	
2023	Jitendra Joshi	"Khal Khal Goda"	Godavari	
2023	Sandeep Khare, Saleel Kulkarni	"Re Kshana"	Ekda Kaay Zala	
2023	Ajay-Atul	"Ved Tujha"	Ved	
2023	Guru Thakur	"Bai Ga"	Chandramukhi	
2024	Guru Thakur & Kshitij Patwardhan	"Kshan Kalche" & "Yeda Mandola"	Unaad	
2024	Kshitij Patwardhan	"Marathi Pori"	Jhimma 2	
2024	Guru Thakur	"Gau Nako Kisna"	Maharashtra Shahir	
2024	Guru Thakur	"Umgaya Baap"	Baaplyok	
2024	Valay Mulgund	"Baipan Bhaari Deva"	Baipan Bhaari Deva	
