= Tejashri Pradhan =

Indian actress (born 1988)

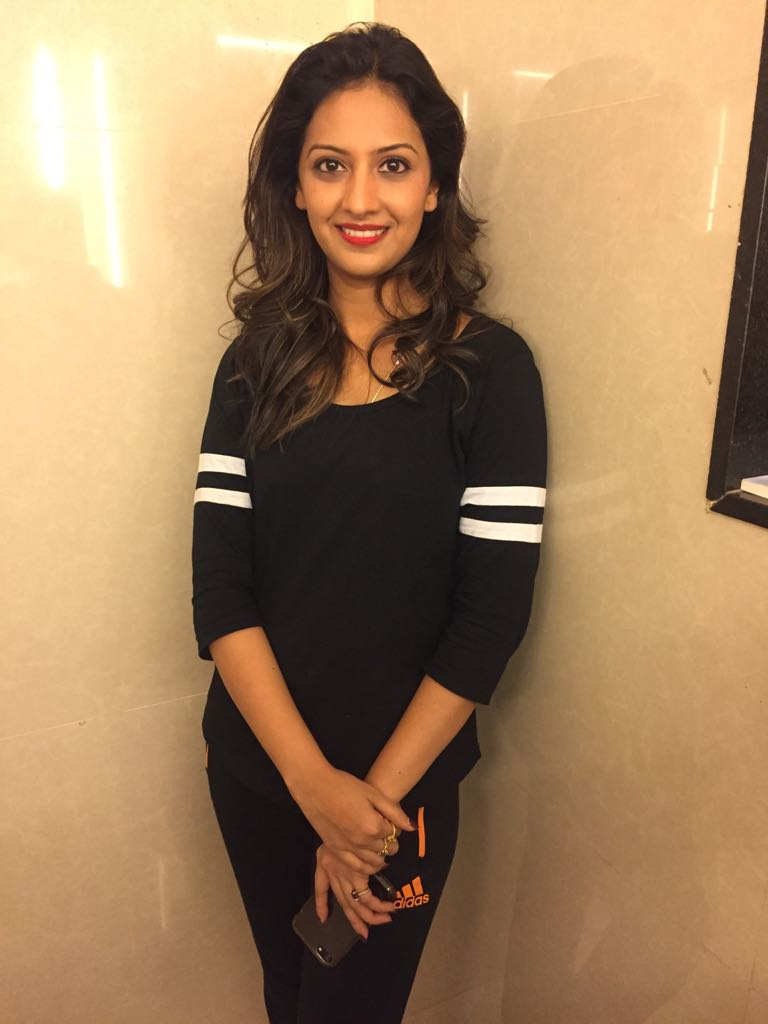
- Pradhan in 2018
- Born: 2 June 1988 (age 38); Mumbai, Maharashtra
- Occupation: Actress
- Years active: 2007–present
- Spouse: Shashank Ketkar (m. 2014; div. 2016)

Tejashri Pradhan (born 2 June 1988) is an Indian television and film actress who has appeared in multiple Marathi films and television serials. She is better known as Shubhra, Janhavi and Swanandi from the Zee Marathi television serials Aggabai Sasubai (2019), Honar Soon Mi Hya Gharchi (2013), and Veen Doghantali Hi Tutena (2025) respectively.

Tejashri also did voice-overs for a mobile application named Go-stories which features various Marathi stories. She has also appeared in a YouTube video Uncomfortable and been a speaker at TED Talks.

== Early life ==
Pradhan was born on 2 June 1988 in a middle class Maharashtrian CKP family. She belongs to the suburb of Dombivli near Mumbai. When she was 15, she decided to enroll in a personality development course that came along with a course in acting. She received the offer of films in her second year at college.

== Personal life ==
She married her co-actor Shashank Ketkar from TV series Honar Soon Mi Hya Gharchi in 2014. The couple divorced in 2016.

== Acting career ==
=== Debut and early work (2007–2013) ===
She made her debut on television with "Hya Gojirvanya Gharat". She also played a small role in "Tuza Ni Maza Ghar Shrimantacha". After that, she played a role of Lakshmi for "Lek Ladaki Hya Gharchi". She debuted in Marathi films with "Zenda" (2010).

=== Success and beyond (2013–present) ===
In 2013, she bagged the role of Janhavi in "Honar Soon Mi Hya Gharchi". She also played roles in various Marathi films such as Sharyat, Lagna Pahave Karun, Dr. Prakash Baba Amte, Judgement, Asehi Ekada Vhave. She is also known for her performance in " Ti Sadhya Kay Karte" (2017). In the same year, she hosted a reality show Sur Nava Dhyas Nava. In 2019, she got big break in Bollywood with Babloo Bachelor. She appeared in "Aggabai Sasubai" as Shubhra.

She also played the role of Mukta in Premachi Gosht. Currently, She is playing the lead role of Swanandi in Veen Doghantali Hi Tutena. She also has a Marathi-English bilingual film called Asa Mee Ashi Mee. Ajinkya Deo is her romantic interest in the film.

== Other works and media image ==
Tejashri has also appeared as a guest in many shows. Her first guest appearance was in Chala Hawa Yeu Dya in 2013 where she promotes her serial Honar Soon Mi Hya Gharchi. After her marriage, she made an appearance in Home Minister with her then husband, Shashank Ketkar. After that, she again appeared in Chala Hawa Yeu Dya for promoting Ti Sadhya Kay Karte (2017). In 2018, she appeared in Tumchyasathi Kay Pan where she promotes Sur Nava Dhyas Nava. In 2019, she appeared as a guest in Kanala Khada. In 2021, she again appeared in Chala Hawa Yeu Dya for promoting Aggabai Sasubai.

In 2020, she was ranked third in The Times of India's Top 15 most desirable women on Marathi television. In 2019, she was ranked ninth among the most popular Marathi TV actresses. In 2021, she ranked first among the "Most Desirable Actresses in Marathi Television". In the same year, she was ranked sixth in "Maharashtra's Stunning & Desirable Beauties".

In addition to her acting career, Pradhan endorses several brands, including Dishwasher bar, ZEE5, Vicco Turmeric, L'Oréal, K-Pra, etc. She also did voice-overs for a mobile application named Go-stories which features various Marathi cine artists.

In 2021, she launched her own production house with Kirti Nerkar called TeK Productions. In 2023, she ranked 10th in the Top 10 Marathi actresses.

== Filmography ==
=== Films ===
Year	Title	Role	Ref.
2009	Zenda	Santya's sister	
2009	Kartavya	Medha	
2010	Chitra	Chitra	
2011	Sharyat	Kanchan	
2013	Lagna Pahave Karun	Aanandi	
2014	Dr. Prakash Baba Amte – The Real Hero	Younger Mandakini Amte	
2017	Oli Ki Suki	Radhika Deshpande	
2017	Ti Sadhya Kay Karte	Tanvi Dev	
2018	Asehi Ekada Vhave	Kiran Paranjape	
2019	Judgement	Rujuta	
2019	Hajari	Swapnali	
2021	Babloo Bachelor	Swati	
2022	Anya	Yamuna	
2024	Panchak	Revati Khot	
2024	Lokshahi	Iravati	
2024	Hashtag Tadev Lagnam	Gayatri Desai	
2026	Asa Mee Ashi Mee	Anagha Deshpande	

=== Television ===
Year	Title	Role	Ref.
2007	Hya Gojirvanya Gharat		
2008	Tuza Ni Maza Ghar Shrimantacha	Aditi	
2011-2013	Lek Ladaki Hya Gharchi	Lakshmi	
2012	Savdhaan India	Jamuna (Episode 286)	
2013-2016	Honar Soon Mi Hya Gharchi	Janhavi Gokhale	
2016	Prem He	Radhika	
2017-2018	Sur Nava Dhyas Nava	Host	
2019-2021	Aggabai Sasubai	Shubhra Kulkarni	
2023-2025	Premachi Gosht	Mukta Koli	
2025-present	Veen Doghantali Hi Tutena	Swanandi Sarpotdar	

==== Special appearances ====
Year	Title	Role	Ref.
2013	Chala Hawa Yeu Dya	Janhavi	
2014	Home Minister	Herself	
2017	Comedy Nights Bachao	Herself	
2018	Tumchyasathi Kay Pan	Herself	
2019	Kanala Khada	Herself	
2020	Chala Hawa Yeu Dya	Shubhra	
2021	Mi Honar Superstar	Herself	
2021	Phulala Sugandha Maticha	Herself	
2022	Jau Nako Dur... Baba	Herself	
2025	Lakshmi Niwas	Swanandi	

=== Web series ===
Year	Title	Role	Ref.
2018	Padded Ki Pushup	Swara	

=== Stage plays ===
Year	Title	Role	Language	Ref.
2011	Fakt Tujhi Saath Haviy	Chhaya Prabhu	Marathi	
2015	Karti Kaljat Ghusli	Kanchan	Marathi	
2016	Mai Aur Tum	Malvika	Hindi	
2019	Tila Kahi Sangaychay	Mitali	Marathi	

=== Music video appearances ===
Year	Title	Singer	Label	Ref.
2011	"Sawali Unhamadhe"	Swapnil Bandodkar	Sagarika Music - Marathi	

== Awards and nominations ==
Year	Award	Categories	Work	Result	Ref.
2013	Zee Marathi Utsav Natyancha Awards	Best Actress	Honar Soon Mi Hya Gharchi	Won	
2013	Zee Marathi Utsav Natyancha Awards	Best Couple	Honar Soon Mi Hya Gharchi	Won	
2014	Zee Marathi Utsav Natyancha Awards	Best Actress	Honar Soon Mi Hya Gharchi	Won	
2014	Zee Marathi Utsav Natyancha Awards	Best Couple	Honar Soon Mi Hya Gharchi	Won	
2014	Zee Marathi Utsav Natyancha Awards	Best Daughter-in-law	Honar Soon Mi Hya Gharchi	Won	
2014	Ma Ta Sanman Awards	Best Supporting Actress	Lagna Pahave Karun	Won	
2018	Sanskruti Kala Darpan	Best Actress	Ti Sadhya Kay Karte	Nominated	
2019	Zee Marathi Utsav Natyancha Awards	Best Actress	Aggabai Sasubai	Nominated	
2019	Zee Marathi Utsav Natyancha Awards	Best Performance of the Year	Aggabai Sasubai	Won	
2020-21	Zee Marathi Utsav Natyancha Awards	Best Actress	Aggabai Sasubai	Nominated	
2020-21	Zee Marathi Utsav Natyancha Awards	Best Daughter in law	Aggabai Sasubai	Won	
2024	Star Pravah Parivar Puraskar	Best Mother	Premachi Gosht	Won	
2025	Radio City Cine Awards Marathi Season 8	Best Actress	Hashtag Tadeva Lagnam	Won	
