= Adkitta =

2026 Indian Marathi-language drama film

- Directed by: Ashutosh Parandkar
- Screenplay by: Ashutosh Parandkar
- Story by: Bhaktiprasad Deshmane
- Produced by: Mangesh Pawar; Sampada Wagh; Mayur Hardas
- Starring: Sai Tamhankar; Siddharth Chandekar; Sakhi Gokhale
- Cinematography: Saumitra Yadnyopavit
- Edited by: Jayant Jathar
- Music by: Hrishikesh Datar
- Production companies: Mangesh Pawar & Co.; Jackpot Entertainmentss; Loka Loka Motion Pictures
- Distributed by: ZEE5
- Release date: 11 September 2026
- Running time: 126 minutes
- Country: India
- Language: Marathi

Adkitta (lit. 'Betel Nut Crackers') is a 2026 Indian Marathi-language drama film written and directed by Ashutosh Parandkar, with the story written by Bhaktiprasad Deshmane. Produced by Mangesh Pawar & Co., Jackpot Entertainmentss and Loka Loka Motion Pictures, it stars Sai Tamhankar, Siddharth Chandekar and Sakhi Gokhale in the lead roles. The film follows a career-oriented couple who hire a nanny to care for their premature son, leading to emotional conflicts involving motherhood, trust and the boundaries of family relationships.

The film premiered on Zee5 on 11 September 2026. Upon release, it received a mixed-to-positive critical response, with particular praise for its performances, story and music.

== Plot ==
Gautam and Kasturi are a career-oriented couple living in an urban city in Maharashtra. When Kasturi discovers that she is pregnant, the couple decides to embrace parenthood despite concerns about balancing their professional and personal lives. During the eighth month of pregnancy, Kasturi learns that she is carrying twins, but one of the babies dies in the womb. Following complications that put both Kasturi's and the surviving baby's lives at risk, she gives birth prematurely to a son named Arjun.

After Arjun's birth, Gautam and Kasturi struggle to balance their careers, household responsibilities and childcare. Unable to manage everything on their own, they decide to hire a nanny. On the recommendation of Gautam's friend Abhay, they employ Mangal, a housekeeper who takes on the responsibility of caring for Arjun.

Mangal's presence initially provides much-needed support to the couple, and she gradually becomes an integral part of their household. As Gautam and Kasturi grow increasingly dependent on her, Mangal develops a close emotional bond with Arjun. Kasturi begins to feel insecure about the growing attachment between her son and Mangal, leading to tensions within the family.

Mangal, who is married to Pratap and has a son of her own, carries the emotional burden of a traumatic past. Her personal struggles and unresolved grief gradually affect her relationship with the family. As the boundaries between Mangal's professional responsibilities and her place within the household become blurred, Gautam and Kasturi are forced to confront questions of trust, dependence and parenthood.

The growing conflict between the couple and Mangal brings their relationships under strain, while the film explores the emotional challenges of motherhood, parental guilt and the complexities of relying on domestic workers to raise a child.

== Cast ==
- Sai Tamhankar as Mangal
- Siddharth Chandekar as Gautam
- Sakhi Gokhale as Kasturi
- Suhas Shirsat as Prataap
- Aashay Kulkarni as Abhay
- Parth Patil as baby
- Aayansh Nalawade as baby
- Rudransh Kate as Mangal's son

== Production ==
The principal photography took place in Pune.

== Soundtrack ==
Track listing
No.	Title	Lyrics	Singer(s)	Length
1.	"Baby Bomb"	Kshitij Patwardhan	Divya Kumar
2.	"Gheun Ye"	Kshitij Patwardhan	Abhay Jodhpurkar
3.	"Ajvar Hote"	Niranjan Parandkar	Aanandi Joshi, Deepika Jog
4.	"Mann Dhavate (Female Version)"	Kshitij Patwardhan	Priyanka Barve
5.	"Mann Dhavate (Male Version)"	Kshitij Patwardhan	Jasraj Jayant Joshi, Priyanka Barve
6.	"Chandawa"	Kshitij Patwardhan	Monali Thakur
7.	"Mazyasave Tu"	Niranjan Parandkar	Ketaki Mategaonkar, Hrishikesh Ranade

== Release ==
The teaser was released in mid-August 2026, while the trailer was released in the first week of September. The film premiered on Zee5 on 11 September 2026 in Marathi with English subtitles.

== Reception ==
Santosh Bhingarde of Sakal found the first half slow-paced, but noted that "the story moves forward according to each incident and gives a shock to the climax." Mayur Sanap of Rediff gave the film 3 out of 5 stars, praising Sakhi Gokhale's performance and the music, and wrote, "Adkitta doesn't have all the answers by the end, and that's okay. It understands that relationships can be messy." Nandini Ramnath of Scroll.in wrote that "Adkitta adequately sets up its topical premise but then loses interest in delving into the intricacies of the employer-employee equation." Bhagyashree Rasal of Maharashtra Times gave the film 3.5 out of 5 stars and described it as "not just a film that comments on motherhood; it is a sensitive slice of life experience that explores love, trust, insecurity, guilt, sorrow and the invisible boundaries between relationships." Athulya Nambiar of Koimoi gave the film 3 out of 5 stars, writing, "The core thought seems heavy but the filmmaker finds a sweet balance between fun and grief." Mihir Bhanage of The Times of India gave the film 3 out of 5 stars, observing that "while it starts well, the film bounces from one thing to another, barely scratching the surface in the sub-plots." Amrita Yadav of Navarashtra found that "the film does not have any major ups and downs or constant shocks. Still, the story moves slowly and keeps the audience engaged."
