= Shashank Ketkar =

Indian television actor (born 1985)

- Born: 15 September 1985 (age 41); Pune, Maharashtra, India
- Occupation: Actor
- Years active: 2012–present
- Spouses: Tejashri Pradhan (m. 2014; div. 2016) Priyanka Dhavale (m. 2017)
- Children: 2

Signature
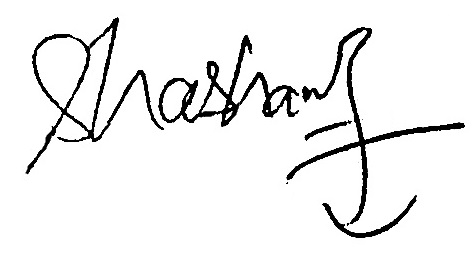

Shashank Ketkar (born 15 September 1985) is a Marathi television and theater actor predominantly working in the Marathi. He is best known for his role as Shree on the daily soap Honar Soon Mi Hya Gharchi.

== Personal life ==
Shashank Ketkar was married to actress Tejashree Pradhan in 2014, but they divorced in 2016. Shashank married again in 2017 to Priyanka Dhavale who is a lawyer by profession and hails from Dombivli, a city near Mumbai.

== Career ==
Ketkar earned a Masters of Engineering Management in Sydney, Australia. He worked as a duty manager at Olympic gold-medalist Ian Thorpe's swimming school in Australia. While in Sydney, he took part in Marathi plays and musical programs organized by cultural groups. Upon completing his education and on returning to India, he decided to indulge in performing arts, which had been only his hobby up till then. He joined "Sudarshan Rangamanch", a theatre group in Pune where he landed his first role in the play Purnaviram, which was directed by Pramod Kale and written by Sachin Kundalkar. He then auditioned for Marathi television shows and debuted as Kailash on ETV Marathi's daily soap Kalay Tasmay Namah, where he played grandson of Vikram Gokhale. He also did a negative character of Aniket Gaydhani in the serial Swapnanchya Palikadle that aired on Star Pravah.

Ketkar's biggest break came in 2013 with the Zee Marathi's daily soap Honar Soon Mi Hya Gharchi where his lead role as Shreerang 'Shree' Gokhale made him popular. In 2013, at the Zee Marathi Awards, Ketkar received the "Best Actor" and "Best Couple" award. In 2015, the show's lead characters Shree and Janhavi started trending on social networks and WhatsApp as Janhavi's famous dialogue in the show "Kahihi ha Shree!", which she regularly repeats, became popular.

In 2014, he played the role of Mangesh Kadam and Leena Bhagwat's son in the play Goshta Tashi Gamtichi, for which he won the Best Supporting Actor (Commercial Plays) at the 2015 Akhil Bhartiya Natya Parishad Awards. In 2015, his first single "Yaara" was released by Sagarika Musics. The romantic-single is co-sung by Deepika Jog and the video also features Ketkar.

== Filmography ==
=== Films ===
Year	Title	Role	Notes	Ref.
2016	One Way Ticket	Aniket	Debut film	
2018	Aaron	Madhav	Indo-French Project	
2018	31 Divas	Makarand Sawant		
2020	Goshta Eka Paithanichi	Subodh		

=== Television ===
Year	Serial	Role	Channel	Ref.
2011–2012	Suvasini	Jayaram	Star Pravah	
2012	Rang Maza Vegla	Sameer	Saam TV	
2012	Kalay Tasmai Namah	Kailash	ETV Marathi	
2013	Swapnanchya Palikadle	Aniket Gaidhani	Star Pravah	
2013–2016	Honar Soon Mi Hya Gharchi	Shrirang "Shree" Gokhale	Zee Marathi	
2016–2017	Ithech Taka Tambu	Kapil Sathe	Zee Yuva	
2017	Naktichya Lagnala Yaycha Ha		Zee Yuva	Zee Marathi
2018–2020	Sukhachya Sarini He Man Baware	Siddharth "Sid" Tatwawadi	Colors Marathi	
2021	Pahile Na Mi Tula	Samar Jahagirdar / Vijay Dhavade	Zee Marathi	
2022–2026	Muramba	Akshay Mukadam	Star Pravah	

=== Music album ===
Year	Album	Song	Composer(s)	Writer(s)	Co-artist(s)
2015	Yaara	Yaara	Hrishikesh Datar, Saurabh Bhalerao, Jasraj Joshi	Vaibhav Joshi	Deepika Jog

=== Plays ===
- Purnaviram
- Goshta Tashi Gamtichi
- Kusum Manohar Lele

=== Web-series ===
- 2023 - Scam 2003 as Jayant Karmarkar aka JK
- 2024 - Showtime as Assistant Director

== Media image ==
Most Desirable Men of Maharashtra
Sponsor	Year	Rank			
Sponsor	Year	TV	Ref.	Film	Ref.
The Times of India, Maharashtra Times	2017	–	–	15	
The Times of India, Maharashtra Times	2018	7		12	
The Times of India, Maharashtra Times	2019	7		24	
The Times of India, Maharashtra Times	2020	8		19	

== Awards ==
Year(s)	Award(s)	Category(s)	Work	Ref.(s)
2013	Zee Marathi Utsav Natyancha Awards	Best Actor	Honar Soon Mi Hya Gharchi	
2013	Zee Marathi Utsav Natyancha Awards	Best Couple (Shree-Jahnavi)	Honar Soon Mi Hya Gharchi	
2013	Zee Marathi Utsav Natyancha Awards	Best Couple (Shree-Janhavi)	Honar Soon Mi Hya Gharchi	
2014	Zee Marathi Utsav Natyancha Awards	Best Couple (Shree-Janhavi)	Honar Soon Mi Hya Gharchi	
2015	MICTA	Best Supporting Actor	Goshta Tashi Gamtichi	
2015	Akhil Bharatiya Marathi Natya Parishad	Best Supporting Actor	Goshta Tashi Gamtichi	
2019	Colors Marathi Awards	Best Couple (Anushri-Siddharth)	Sukhachya Sarini He Man Baware	
2019	Colors Marathi Awards	Best Actor	Sukhachya Sarini He Man Baware	
2021	Zee Marathi Utsav Natyancha Awards 2020-21	Most Influential Character	Pahile Na Mi Tula	
2022	Star Pravah Parivar Puraskar	Best New Member	Muramba	
2022	Star Pravah Parivar Puraskar	Best Husband	Muramba	
2023	Star Pravah Parivar Puraskar	Best Husband	Muramba	
2023	Star Pravah Parivar Puraskar	Best Romantic Couple (Akshay-Rama)	Muramba	
2025	Star Pravah Parivar Puraskar	Best Romantic Couple (Akshay-Rama)	Muramba	
