= Pahile Na Mi Tula =

Indian Marathi series

- Genre: Drama
- Story by: Shekhar Dhavalikar
- Directed by: Manish Khandelwal
- Starring: See below
- Theme music composer: Vaibhav Joshi
- Opening theme: "Pahile Na Mi Tula" by Anandi Joshi
- Composer: Samir Saptiskar
- Country of origin: India
- Original language: Marathi
- No. of episodes: 154

Production
- Producers: Mahesh Kothare; Adinath Kothare
- Camera setup: Multi-camera
- Running time: 22 minutes
- Production company: Kothare Vision

Original release
- Network: Zee Marathi
- Release: 1 March – 28 August 2021

Pahile Na Mi Tula (transl. I didn't see you) is an Indian Marathi-language television series. It premiered from 1 March 2021 and aired on Zee Marathi. The show starred Shashank Ketkar, Tanvi Mundle, Aashay Kulkarni in lead roles.

== Synopsis ==
Manasi, a young woman, works in a company named Lankari Finance where Samar, a business tycoon is the Manager. She loves Aniket, her childhood friend, an MBA graduate but presently working as a taxi driver, due to unavailability of better job. But Samar's constant obsession with her poses a hurdle in their love life but Manasi irrespective of Samar's tortures continues to fight.

== Cast ==
=== Main ===
- Aashay Kulkarni as Aniket; Manasi's husband
- Shashank Ketkar as Samar Pratap Jahagirdar / Vijay Dhavade; Manasi's boss, Lankari Finance's branch manager
- Tanvi Mundle as Manasi Rajan Desai; Aniket's wife, Samar's love interest

=== Recurring ===
- Ram Daund as Rajan Desai; Manasi's father
- Priyanka Tendolkar as Megha Rajan Desai / Megha Satyajeet Wadekar; Manasi's sister
- Sachin Deshpande as Satyajeet Wadekar; Megha's husband
- Iravati Lagoo as Nirmala Rajan Desai; Manasi's mother
- Varsha Dandale as Usha; Aniket's mother
- Santosh Sarode as Mr. Parab; office worker
- Prakash Sawant as Office servant
- Pramod Bansode as Mr. More; office worker
- Sumeet Bhokse as Chaitanya; Aniket's friend
- Manjusha Khetri as Neelam; Manasi's office friend
- Nilpari Khanwalkar as Bharati; Manasi's office friend
- Ananda Karekar as Mr. Bhope; Samar's assistant
- Tejashree Muley as Sangi; Samar's wife
- Sagar Sakpal as Auto driver
- Amit Phatak as Manohar Varghode; Manasi's fiance
- Geetanjali Ganage as Isha; Office Receptionist
  - Sanika Kashikar replaced Geetanjali as Isha

== Production ==
The series premiered on 1 March 2021 and aired on Zee Marathi from Monday to Saturday. The show is produced under the banner of Kothare Vision.

=== Casting ===
Shashank Ketkar first time reprising the negative role as Samar. Tanvi Mundle debutants the role of Manasi and Aashay Kulkarni got the role of Aniket. Sachin Deshpande got the role of Satyajeet and Priyanka Tendolkar got the role of Megha.
