= Assa Sasar Surekh Baai =

Marathi-language TV drama series

- Genre: Family drama
- Directed by: Prasad Gokhale
- Starring: See below
- Theme music composer: Avdhoot Gupte
- Opening theme: "Assa Sasar Surekh Baai" by Avdhoot Gupte, Maithili Panase-Josi, Priyanka Barve and Savaniee Ravindra
- Country of origin: India
- Original language: Marathi
- No. of episodes: 861

Production
- Executive producer: Aniket Mhasvekar
- Producer: Shashank Solanki
- Cinematography: Harsh Sharma
- Camera setup: Multi-camera
- Running time: 22 minutes

Original release
- Network: Colors Marathi
- Release: 27 July 2015 – 31 March 2018

Assa Sasar Surekh Baai (transl. Such a beautiful mother-in-law) is an Indian Marathi language television series which aired on Colors Marathi. The show starred Mrunal Dusanis and Santosh Juvekar in lead roles. The series premiered from 27 July 2015 and ended on 31 March 2018.

== Plot ==
It is a romantic series that proves that an extraordinary love story can blossom in the most ordinary places. Through Jui and Yash, the audience lives a love story so beautiful, that even a non-believer will acknowledge the power of love. Against all odds this young couple manages to create and nurture their own precious little world, where love, is all one ever needs.

=== Ratings ===
Week	Year	BARC Viewership		Ref.
Week	Year	TRP	Rank	Ref.
Week 13	2016	1.6	1	

== Cast ==
=== Main ===
- Mrunal Dusanis as Jui Pruthviraj Inamdar / Jui Yash Mahajan
  - Sayli Patil replaced Mrunal as Jui Yash Mahajan/ Jui Digvijay Mohite
- Santosh Juvekar as Yash Mahajan / Digvijay (Jay) Mohite (Yash's lookalike)

=== Recurring ===
- Shweta Pendse as Vibhavari Pruthviraj Inamdar
- Abhijeet Chavan as Shreedhar Mahajan
- Janhavi Panshikar as Yash's mother
- Rajashri Nikam as Nalini (Nalu) Shreedhar Mahajan
- Yashashri Upasani as Hema Shreedhar Mahajan
- Akanksha Gade as Rekha Shreedhar Mahajan
- Swapnil Kale as Siddhu
- Gautam Jogalekar as Pruthviraj Inamdar
- Avinash Narkar as Hemraj Jahagirdar
- Monika Dabade as Reema Pruthviraj Inamdar
- Ankita Panvelkar as Ketaki
- Ajinkya Nanaware as Vaibhav
- Vishakha Subhedar as Bakula
- Satish Salagare as Mr. Dhamane
