= Sukhachya Sarini He Man Baware =

Marathi Drama series

- Also known as: He Man Baware
- Genre: Romance; Family drama
- Written by: Madhugandha Kulkarni
- Directed by: Mandar Devsthali
- Starring: See below
- Theme music composer: Rohan-Rohan
- Country of origin: India
- Original language: Marathi
- No. of episodes: 555

Production
- Executive producers: Omkar Karambalikar; Vishakha Joshi
- Producer: Mandar Devsthali
- Production locations: Mumbai, Maharashtra, India
- Cinematography: Hrishikesh Mudrale
- Editors: Dinesh Potdar; Abhishek Musale
- Running time: 22 minutes

Original release
- Network: Colors Marathi
- Release: 9 October 2018 – 24 October 2020

Sukhachya Sarini He Man Baware (transl. This mind is filled with showers of happiness) is an Indian Marathi language television series which aired on Colors Marathi. It starred Mrunal Dusanis and Shashank Ketkar in lead roles. It premiered from 9 October 2018 and ended on 24 October 2020.

== Plot ==
It is a story of Siddharth and Anushri. Sid, a business tycoon falls in love with Anu, a widow who only sees him as a best friend. Later, he is successful in making her fall for him but the main struggle is to convince his mother.

== Cast ==
=== Main ===
- Shashank Ketkar as Siddharth Tatwawadi (Sid)
- Mrunal Dusanis as Anushri Dattatray Dixit / Anushri Siddharth Tatwawadi (Anu)

=== Recurring ===
- Sharmishtha Raut as Sanyogita Tatwawadi; Siddharth's sister
- Vandana Gupte / Asha Shelar as Durga Tatwawadi; Siddharth's mother
- Nayana Apte Joshi as Aaji
- Sangram Samel as Samrat Tatwawadi; Siddharth's brother)
- Vidisha Mhaskar as Sanvi Samrat Tatwawadi; Samrat's wife
- Vijay Mishra as Deenanath Tatwawadi; Siddharth's Uncle
- Pradeep Patwardhan
- Ashwini Mukadam
- Madhavi Juvekar
- Sayalee Parab-Shelar
- Shalaka Pawar
- Trushna Chandratre

== Reception ==
It gained fifth position in Week 7 of 2020 with 3.0 TRP in Top 5 Marathi TV Shows.

== Awards ==
Colors Marathi Awards 2019
Year	Category	Recipient	Role
2019	Best Title Song	Rohan-Rohan	Music Director
2019	Best Actor	Shashank Ketkar	Siddharth
2019	Best Actress	Mrunal Dusanis	Anushri
2019	Best Onscreen Couple	Shashank Ketkar-Mrunal Dusanis	Siddharth-Anushri

== Adaptations ==
Language	Title	Original release	Network(s)	Last aired	Notes
Marathi	Sukhachya Sarini He Man Baware सुखाच्या सरींनी हे मन बावरे	9 October 2018	Colors Marathi	24 October 2020	Original
Kannada	Ivalu Sujatha ಇವಳು ಸುಜಾತ	26 August 2019	Colors Kannada	12 June 2020	Remake
