= Maziya Priyala Preet Kalena =

Indian television series

- Genre: Drama; Romance
- Created by: Ekta Kapoor
- Starring: See below
- Theme music composer: "Maziya Priyala Preet Kalena" by Ashwini Shende
- Country of origin: India
- Original language: Marathi
- No. of episodes: 354

Production
- Producers: Ekta Kapoor; Shobha Kapoor
- Production locations: Mumbai, Maharashtra
- Camera setup: Multi-camera
- Running time: 22 minutes
- Production company: Balaji Telefilms

Original release
- Network: Zee Marathi
- Release: 14 June 2010 – 30 July 2011

Maziya Priyala Preet Kalena (transl. My friend doesn't know love) is an Indian Marathi language TV series which aired on Zee Marathi. It is produced by Ekta Kapoor under the banner of Balaji Telefilms. It premiered from 8 June 2010 by replacing Kulvadhu. It starred Mrunal Dusanis and Abhijeet Khandkekar in lead roles.

== Summary ==
The series revolves around an innocent girl Shamika who is NRI and a middle class boy Abhijeet Pendse who falls in love with her. The series explores their lives and the hardships faced but solved with their unconditional love for each other and the emotional journey they undergo.

== Plot ==
Shamika Raje, a beautiful NRI comes to India with her loving step-mother Sandhya and step-sister Riya to seek her partner. Sandhya arranges Shamika's alliance with Jay Prabhu, son of Leena Prabhu, Sandhya's friend. Jay is a playboy hence asks his cousin brother Abhijeet Pendse to receive them. Abhi falls for Shamika but is unaware about his feelings. Abhi tries to establish a relationship between Shamika and Jay. During this Jay unwilling misframes Abhi for his mistakes. Jay's friend Rahul tries to misbehave with Riya and Abhi opposes him. Rahul tries to torture Riya and Shamika but ends up shooting Abhi. Abhi during this reveals his love for Shamika to her. He is saved and Abhi and Shamika clear all the misunderstandings and learn the true colors of Jay. Shamika accepts Abhi's love and they start a relationship.

Elsewhere it is revealed that Sandhya is blackmailing Jay and Leena to get him married to Shamika to transfer all the property to her and Riya. Since Jay was responsible for Ashwini, Shamika's elder sister death, Sandhya blackmails Jay and Leena. It is revealed that Ashwini was actually saved by Abhi and his friends and she was into coma. Riya also meanwhile falls for Abhi. She attempts suicide but is saved by Abhi who learns her feelings and Shamika. Jay is enraged by Abhi's life and Shamika's declining proposal frames Abhi for a fraud with his ex-girlfriend Soniya. Shamika but successfully saves Abhi from this issue. During this, Riya learns that all the assets and property belong to Shamika alone. To avenge this, she joins hands with Jay to separate Abhi and Shamika. Shamika passes all the tests by Abhi's family and gets accepted by them.

During Abhi and Shamika's engagement, Jay reveals that he falsely married Shamika and is the owner of her property. Leena gets disgusted by all this planning and plotting and tries to save Ashu who was kidnapped and kept hidden by Sandhya. Leena learns all the truth and blackmails Sandhya to mend ways for good. But Sandhya kills her by poisoning her.

== Cast ==
=== Main ===
- Mrunal Dusanis as Shamika Raje - Pendse, Sandhya's step- daughter, Ashwini's younger sister, Rita's step-sister
- Abhijeet Khandkekar as Abhijeet Pendse, Vibhavari and Subhash's son, Madhuri and Meghana's brother, Shamika's husband

=== Recurring ===
- Sneha Kulkarni as Riya, Chandu's wife, Abhi's ex-lover, Sandhya's daughter, Ashu and Shamika's step-sister
- Prasad Jawade as Jay Prabhu, Leena's son, Abhi, Meghana and Madhuri's cousin
- Harshada Khanvilkar as Sandhya Raje, Riya's mother, Shamika and Ashwini's step-mother
- Sanjay Mone as Subhash Pendse, Abhi, Meghana, Madhuri's father, Leena's brother
- Suhita Thatte as Vibhavari Pendse, Abhi, Meghana, Madhuri's mother
- Sumukhi Pendse as Leena Pendse - Prabhu, Jay's mother, Subhash's sister, Abhijeet's aunt, Sandhya's best friend
- Dhanashri Kadgaonkar as Meghana Pendse, Abhi and Madhuri's younger sister, Subhash and Vibhavari youngest daughter
- Sankarshan Karhade as Chandu, Abhi's friend, Riya's husband
- Amita Khopkar as Maai, Raje's Caretaker
- Jui Gadkari as Soniya, Jai's ex-girlfriend
- Tanvi Kishore as Namrata

== Awards ==
Zee Marathi Utsav Natyancha Awards 2010
Category	Recipients	Role
Best Family		Pendse Family
Best Actor	Abhijeet Khandkekar	Abhijeet
Best Couple	Abhijeet Khandkekar-Mrunal Dusanis	Abhijeet-Shamika
Best Newcomer Male	Abhijeet Khandkekar	Abhijeet
Best Newcomer Female	Mrunal Dusanis	Shamika
Best Title Song	Ashok Patki	Music Composer
Best Mother	Suhita Thatte	Vibhavari
Best Lyricist	Ashwini Shende	

=== Ratings ===
Week	Year	TAM TVR	Rank		Ref.
Week	Year	TAM TVR	Mah/Goa	All India	Ref.
Week 43	2010	0.7	1	97	
