= Mrunal Dusanis =

Indian television actress

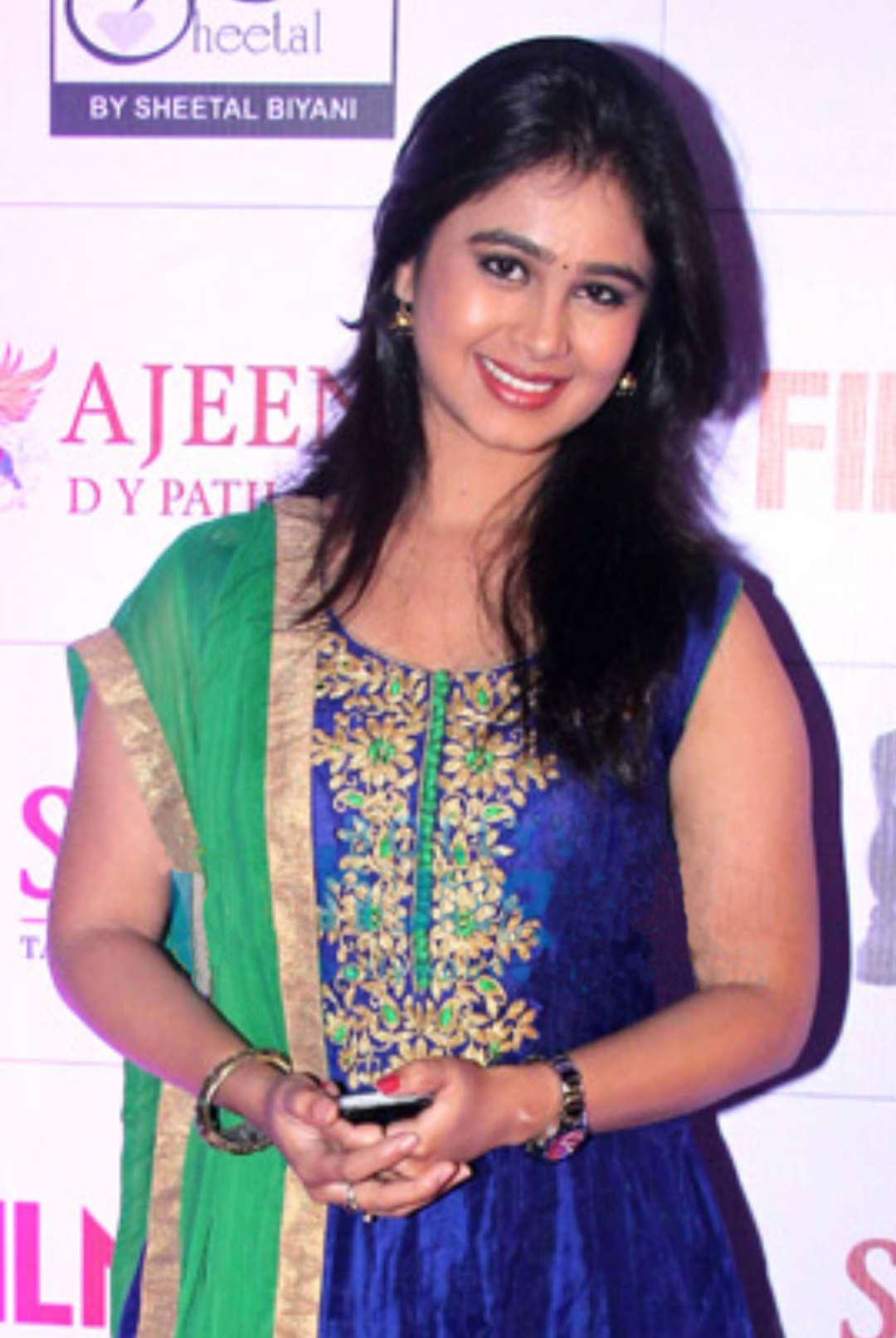
- at Filmfare Marathi Awards 2014
- Born: 20 June 1988 (age 38); Nashik, Maharashtra
- Occupation: Actress
- Years active: 2010–present
- Known for: Maziya Priyala Preet Kalena; Tu Tithe Me; Assa Sasar Surekh Baai; Sukhachya Sarini He Man Baware; Lagnanantar Hoilach Prem
- Spouse: Neeraj More (m. 2016)
- Children: 1

Mrunal Dusanis (born 20 June 1988) is a Marathi actress. She is known for her lead roles in Marathi television programs.

== Early life ==
She was born in Nashik, Maharashtra. She did her schooling from Maratha High School and later went to HPT College, Nashik. She completed a degree in Masters in journalism.

== Personal life ==
She married Neeraj More in 2016 who is a software engineer by profession. In March 2022, she had a baby girl.

== Career ==
She has started her career with Ekta Kapoor's serial Maziya Priyala Preet Kalena. After that, she appeared in Tu Tithe Me on Zee Marathi. In 2015, she appeared in Assa Sasar Surekh Bai serial that aired on Colors Marathi. In 2018, she was seen in Sukhachya Sarini He Man Baware serial as Anushri. Since 2024, she is appearing in Lagnanantar Hoilach Prem as Nandini Jeeva Deshmukh serial that airs on Star Pravah.

== Filmography ==
Television
Year	Title	Role	Channel	Ref.
2010–2011	Maziya Priyala Preet Kalena	Shamika Raje Pendse	Zee Marathi	
2011	Madhu Ethe Ani Chandra Tithe	Avani	Zee Marathi	
2011	Eka Peksha Ek – Apsara Aali	Contestant	Zee Marathi	
2011–2012	Aamhi Saare Khavayye	Host	Zee Marathi	
2012–2014	Tu Tithe Me	Manjiri Sarnaik Mudholkar	Zee Marathi	
2012	Hapta Band	Guest appearance	Zee Marathi	
2014	Remote Majha	Host	ABP Majha	
2015–2017	Assa Sasar Surekh Baai	Jui Inamdar Mahajan	Colors Marathi	
2018–2020	Sukhachya Sarini He Man Baware	Anushri Dixit Tatwawadi	Colors Marathi	
2024-present	Lagnanantar Hoilach Prem	Nandini Jeeva Deshmukh	Star Pravah	

Movies
Year	Title	Role	Ref.
2013	Shrimant Damodar Pant	Suman	

== Awards and nominations ==
Years	Awards	Category	Serial	Result
2010	Zee Marathi Utsav Natyancha Awards	Best Actress	Maziya Priyala Preet Kalena	Nominated
2010	Zee Marathi Utsav Natyancha Awards	Best Couple (as Shamika-Abhijeet)	Maziya Priyala Preet Kalena	Won
2010	Zee Marathi Utsav Natyancha Awards	Best Female Debut	Maziya Priyala Preet Kalena	Won
2012	Zee Marathi Utsav Natyancha Awards	Best Actress	Tu Tithe Me	Won
2012	Zee Marathi Utsav Natyancha Awards	Best Daughter-in-law	Tu Tithe Me	Won
2012	Zee Marathi Utsav Natyancha Awards	Best Couple (as Manjiri-Satyajeet)	Tu Tithe Me	Nominated
2013	Zee Marathi Utsav Natyancha Awards	Best Daughter-in-law	Tu Tithe Me	Won
2013	Zee Marathi Utsav Natyancha Awards	Best Actress	Tu Tithe Me	Nominated
2013	Zee Marathi Utsav Natyancha Awards	Best Couple (as Manjiri-Satyajeet)	Tu Tithe Me	Nominated
2019	Colors Marathi Awards	Best Daughter-in-law	Sukhachya Sarini He Man Baware	Nominated
2019	Colors Marathi Awards	Best Actress	Sukhachya Sarini He Man Baware	Won
2019	Colors Marathi Awards	Best Couple (as Anu-Sidharth)	Sukhachya Sarini He Man Baware	Won
