= Double Seat =

2015 Indian Marathi-language film

- Theatrical release poster
- Directed by: Sameer Vidwans
- Screenplay by: Kshitij Patwardhan; Sameer Vidwans
- Story by: Kshitij Patwardhan; Sameer Vidwans
- Produced by: Ranjeet Gugle
- Starring: Ankush Choudhary; Mukta Barve
- Cinematography: Arjun Sorte
- Edited by: Charu Shree Roy
- Music by: Jasraj, Saurabh, Hrishikesh
- Production companies: Essel Vision Productions; H.U.G.E. Pratisaad Production
- Distributed by: Essel Vision Productions
- Release date: 14 August 2015 (Theatrical)
- Running time: 138 minutes
- Country: India
- Language: Marathi
- Box office: ₹20 crore

Double Seat is a Marathi movie directed by Sameer Vidwans, who had also directed Time Please in 2013. Released on 14 August 2015, it starred Ankush Choudhary and Mukta Barve.

Double Seat has received positive reviews with critics who are praising the performances of Ankush Choudhary and Mukta Barve. Mukta Won Maharashtra State Film Award for Best Actress And Filmfare Awards Marathi Best Actress.

== Synopsis ==
Double Seat portrays the struggles of a recently married couple seeking to move out of their family home and buy an apartment. Born and raised in Metropolitan Mumbai, Amit works in the packing industry with his approach to life reinforced by his father, a horse trainer. Amit's wife, Manjiri, a native of the village of Roha, with a remarkable zest for life, is optimistic about working as an LIC agent despite the difficulties of adjusting to city life.

== Cast ==
- Ankush Choudhary as Amit Naik
- Mukta Barve as Manjiri Naik
- Vidyadhar Joshi as Amit's father
- Vandana Gupte as Amit's mother
- Sandeep Pathak as Traffic Policeman Amit's Friend
- Shivani Rangole as Sapna Sharma, neighbor of Amit & Manjiri
- Jayant Savarkar as Ajoba, grandfather of Chawl
- Pushkar Shrotri as Amit's Friend (Guest Appearance)
- Asawari Joshi as Chakuli Mami (Guest Appearance)

== Release ==
The movie was released in Maharashtra, Karnataka, Goa, Gujarat, Madhya Pradesh, and Delhi on 14 August 2015 with 3,000 shows daily with English subtitles. Essel Vision distributed the film.

The movie had its world television premiere on Zee Marathi 8 November 2015, for which the actors filmed a special promo shoot.

== Soundtrack ==
Double Seat

Soundtrack album by Jasraj, Saurabh, Hrishikesh
- Released: 23 July 2015
- Genre: Film soundtrack
- Length: 22:59
- Label: Video Palace

Jasraj, Saurabh, Hrishikesh chronology
Online Binline (2015)	Double Seat (2015)	Phuntroo (2016)

Spruha Joshi, Kshitij Patwardhan, and Sameer Vidwans wrote lyrics for the film's soundtrack. Jasraj, Saurabh, and Hrishikesh composed the score.

=== Track listing ===
Double Seat
No.	Title	Singer(s)	Length
1.	"Mohini"	Shreya Ghoshal, Jasraj Joshi	4:00
2.	"Man Phiruni"	Abhay Jodhpurkar, Priyanka Barve, Deepika Jog-Datar	6:08
3.	"Kiti Sangaichay Mala"	Jasraj Joshi, Aanandi Joshi	5:26
4.	"Man Suddha Tuza"	Ajay Gogavale, Priyanka Barve, Deepika Jog-Datar	3:28
5.	"Ritya"	Hrishikesh Ranade	3:57
6.	"Man Phiruni (Reprise)"	Abhay Jodhpurkar, Priyanka Barve	4:34
Total length:			22:59

== Reception ==
Pune Mirror, the Times of India, and the Maharashtra Times gave the film 4-star reviews.

== Box Office ==
Double Seat opened on high note collecting more than ₹5 crore (US$520,000) in first 5 days. The film reportedly grossed around ₹20 crore (US$2.1 million) in its full run at the box office.

== Awards ==
Double Seat received five awards at the Maharashtracha Favourite Kon 2015 award ceremony. Anandi Joshi and Jasraj Joshi won the Best Singer awards for "Kiti Sangaychay Mla" which also won the award for Best Song. The lead actors, Ankush Choudhary and Mukta Barve, won awards for Best Actor and Best Actress respectively. Double Seat has been officially selected as the best Marathi film album of 2015 by Apple Music.
