= One Way Ticket (2016 film) =

2016 Marathi-language film

- Directed by: Kamal Nathani; Amol Shetge
- Written by: Amol Shetge
- Produced by: Komal Unawane
- Starring: Sachit Patil; Amruta Khanvilkar; Gashmeer Mahajani; Neha Mahajan; Shashank Ketkar
- Cinematography: Roopang Acharya
- Edited by: Ashish Mhatre; Apurva Motiwale
- Music by: Gaurav Dagaonkar
- Release date: 23 September 2016
- Running time: 93 minutes
- Country: India
- Language: Marathi

One Way Ticket is an Indian Marathi-language mystery film directed by Kamal Nathani and Amol Shetge and produced by Komal Unawane. The film stars Sachit Patil, Amruta Khanvilkar, Gashmeer Mahajani, Neha Mahajan and Shashank Ketkar (in his film debut). The music is composed by Gaurav Dagoankar. The film was released on 23 September 2016 and was successful at the box-office.

== Synopsis ==
Aniket boards a cruise ship using Aditya's passport after he stumbles upon it accidentally. However, Aniket finds out that Shivani, Aditya's girlfriend, is on the cruise and may blow his cover.

== Cast ==
- Sachit Patil as Samar Raj
- Amruta Khanvilkar as Shivani
- Gashmeer Mahajani as Adiatya Rane
- Shashank Ketkar as Aniket
- Neha Mahajan as Urvashi Pradhan
- Aasha Shelar as Aniket's mother
- Rishi Deshpande as Shivani's father
- Roger D'costa

== Production ==
Shooting began on 21 September 2015. The film was shot in 4 European countries.

== Soundtrack ==
One Way Ticket

Soundtrack album by Gaurav Dagaonkar
- Released: 2016
- Recorded: 2016
- Genre: Feature film soundtrack
- Length: 20:30
- Language: Marathi
- Label: Video Palace

Official audio
- One Way Ticket – Full Album on YouTube

The songs are composed by Gaurav Dagaonkar and background score is given by Troy Arif.

Track listing
No.	Title	Singer(s)	Length
1.	"Befikar"	Rohit Raut, Shrinidhi Ghatate	4:44
2.	"Reshami Reshami"	Aanandi Joshi, Gaurav Degaokar	4:36
3.	"Mast Malanga"	Gaurav Degaokar, Savani Ravindra	2:16
4.	"Hura Hura"	Arunima Bhattacharya, Kshitij Wagh	3:29
5.	"One Way Ticket (Title Track)"	Shifa Harris, Orinima, Gaurav Degaokar	2:39
Total length:			17:04

== Critical response ==
One Way Ticket received mixed reviews from critics. Mihir Bhanage of The Times of India gave the film a rating of 2/5 and wrote "OWT could’ve been a very good thriller had more focus been given to developing the script and story instead of innumerable aerial shots of the cruise ship, random songs on the streets of European nations and well, the ‘in-built’ talcum powder ad". Ganesh Matkari of Pune Mirror wrote "If we want to see another country, or go on a cruise, we would be buying a different ticket. In a 93-minute film, one expects a compact screenplay that would keep us occupied in the flow of events. Here, songs and sightseeing take over the film and let the suspense take a back seat". A reviewer from Loksatta wrote "More than a mystery film, Ponds promotion can be a feature of this film. The highly anticipated film is a huge disappointment". Soumitra Pote of Maharashtra Times gave the film 2 stars out of 5 and wrote "The length of the movie is only 93 minutes. If you are a fan of these actors, then watch this movie".
