= Honar Soon Mi Hya Gharchi =

Indian television soap opera

- Genre: Indian soap opera
- Written by: Madhugandha Kulkarni
- Screenplay by: Madhugandha Kulkarni
- Directed by: Mandar Devsthali
- Starring: See below
- Opening theme: Vaishali Made and Shruti Bhave
- Composer: Nilesh Moharir
- Country of origin: India
- Original language: Marathi
- No. of episodes: 808

Production
- Producer: Mandar Devsthali
- Editor: Harishchandra Mistry
- Running time: 22 minutes
- Production company: Teamwork Ultra Creations

Original release
- Network: Zee Marathi
- Release: 15 July 2013 – 24 January 2016

Honar Soon Mi Hya Gharchi (transl. I'll be the daughter-in-law of this house) is an Indian Marathi language television series that aired on Zee Marathi. It starred Tejashri Pradhan and Shashank Ketkar in lead roles. It premiered from 15 July 2013 by replacing Unch Majha Zoka. The story revolves around Shrirang (Shree) who stays with his grandmother and five mothers. When Shree marries Janhavi, then she has trouble dealing with six mothers-in-laws.

== Plot ==
Shrirang lives with his grandmother and five more women whom he equally treats as his mother. He owns a business "Gokhale Gruha Udyog" which his grandmother had established. He falls in love with Janhavi, who lives a modest life with her father, brother and step-mother, and works in a bank. They meet on a bus-stop and develop a beautiful bond. Initially Shri does not let Janhavi know he belongs to a rich family to maintain the simplicity of their relationship. But as they both fall in love, he reveals it to her. Janhavi's stepmother creates several problems in the pair's wedding and extorts the Gokhale family on various occasions. She also arranges her alliance with an aged man called Anil Apte. Before marriage, Shri's grandmother misunderstands Janhavi, especially given her mother's greedy nature. After marriage, Janhavi wins everyone's hearts with her caring nature. She also encourages all women in their home to take up various activities and businesses. She also brings Shri's estranged uncle and father back home.

Janhavi meets a road accident and partially loses her memory, forgetting all about her marriage with Shri. But she still moves back to Shri's home upon knowing the fact. She falls for Shri all over again. Janhavi regains her memory after living with the Gokhale family for a while.

Janhavi's little brother - Rohan, who goes by Pintya - gets in a pandemonium from his boss Kishore. His boss threatens him to do as he says. If he doesn't listen, he would kill his father and Shri. To save his loved ones' lives, he makes Shri's image brutal on social media. Everyone blames Janhavi because of what Pintya did, claiming that she did not take responsibility and stop him. Janhavi, expecting a baby, sobs over and over again, as she is at risk of losing it. No one except Geeta and Janhavi's parents know she is pregnant. Shri is about to give Janhavi a divorce due to misunderstandings created by her stepmother. The women in the house worry about Shri and decide to do his second marriage and leave Janhavi, as they do not know that Janhavi has not done anything, nor that she is pregnant. They find a bride for Shri. Janhavi often tries to stop Shri to tell him the truth, but can't. After some more incidents, Shri's grandmother and uncle also learn of her pregnancy and finally it is revealed to Shri at a function at 'Narmada Yoga Centre', named after Shri's mother who possibly runs the business. Over there Shri and Janhavi reunite, but they have yet to solve Baby Aatya and the five other mothers' misconceptions about Janhavi. As a result, Shri stops talking with his six mothers and then Janhavi overcomes his mothers' misunderstanding by her tricks. Now she must address Pintya's wedding. His mother is trying to hook him up with a rich family, whereas he has fallen for a girl at his office. However, she lives in Dharavi, the biggest slum in Asia. His mother demands him to chuck her out of his life. Shri advises him to run away and get married. On the other hand, Janhavi thinks she can try and explain the situation to her vicious stepmom. Pintya's father agrees with Shri's opinion. Pintya has a little chat with him and comes to a conclusion that he has to take responsibility for his own actions and should leave his pregnant big sister out of his problems.

Pintya marries Sunita against his mother's will. Initially, Kala and Sunita clash, but Sadashiv resolves it forcibly. Saru marries a middle aged man, Pradyumna. Pradyumna's friend is later revealed to be Devendra, Baby Aatya's estranged husband.

On their anniversary, Devendra tries to reconcile with his wife, but Baby insults him and tells him to leave. Devendra explains Baby left him because of an incident which did not happen. Baby apologizes and returns to her husband. The other family members return. With some help from Janhavi, Pintya buys a flat for his family. Janhavi gives birth to a baby girl while Shri adopts another child from an orphanage. The family is delighted by the arrival of two baby girls, as the adopted baby is also a female. The serial ends with the entire family naming the baby "Krushna".

== Cast ==
=== Main ===
- Tejashri Pradhan as Janhavi Shrirang Gokhale / Janhavi Sadashiv Sahastrabuddhe (Janu)
- Shashank Ketkar as Shrirang Ramakant Gokhale (Shree)

=== Recurring ===
Shree's family

- Rohini Hattangadi as Bhagirathi Gokhale (Aai Aaji)
- Manoj Joshi as Ramakant Gokhale (Baba)
- Suhita Thatte as Narmada Ramakant Gokhale (Aai)
- Pournima Talwalkar as Kaveri Gokhale (Baby Aatya)
- Supriya Pathare as Indrayani Umakant Gokhale (Mothi Aai)
- Prasad Oak as Laxmikant Gokhale (Kanta)
- Leena Bhagwat as Sharayu Laxmikant Gokhale (Chhoti Aai)
- Smita Saravade as Saraswati (Saru Mavshi)

Janhavi's family

- Asha Shelar as Shashikala Sadashiv Sahastrabuddhe (Kala)
- Manoj Kolhatkar as Sadashiv Sahastrabuddhe (Baba)
- Rohan Gujar as Rohan Sadashiv Sahastrabuddhe (Pintya)

Others

- Atul Parchure as Sadanand Borkar
- Satish Salagare as Anil Apte
- Vipul Salunkhe as Mahesh Anil Apte
- Smita Oak as Sandhya Shivade
- Radhika Deshpande as Geeta
- Sachin Deshpande as Manish
- Vinod Gaykar as Nandan
- Abhijeet Zunjarrao as Devendra
- Samir Choughule as Pradyumna (Pappu)
- Pournima Ahire as Pappu's mother

== Soundtrack ==
Honar Sun Me Hya Gharchi

Soundtrack album by Nilesh Moharir
- Released: 15 July 2013
- Genre: Romance
- Language: Marathi

The songs were composed by Nilesh Moharir. The three song album featured vocals by Vaishali Made, Shruti Bhave, Madhura Kumbhar, Savani Ravindra, Mangesh Borgaonkar, with lyrics by Mandar Cholkar. It was released in 2013.

No.	Title	Lyrics	Singer(s)	Length
1.	"Honar Sun Me Hya Gharchi"	Mandar Cholkar	Vaishali Mhade, Shruti Bhave	01:14
2.	"Honar Sun Me Hya Gharchi"	Mandar Cholkar	Vaishali Made, Madhura Kumbhar	01:11
3.	"Tujhe Majhe Ek Naav"	Mandar Cholkar	Savani Ravindra, Mangesh Borgaonkar	04:33
4.	"Me Tula Tu Mala"	Mandar Cholkar	Savani Ravindra, Mangesh Borgaonkar	03:54
5.	"Kaljat Khol Khol"	Mandar Cholkar	Mangesh Borgaonkar	03:02
Total length:				12:54

== Production ==
The lead actors Pradhan and Ketkar won best actress and best actor awards respectively at the Zee Marathi Utsav Natyancha Awards in 2013. The show won a total 11 awards in various categories at this award function. The mangalsutra Pradhan wore in the show, with three lines, became a fashion and was also sold on EBay. The actors Pradhan and Ketkar got married in real life on 8 February 2014 at Pune. But, divorced later by 2016. The show completed more than 808 episodes and concluded on 24 January 2016.

=== Seasons ===
- 16 June 2014 (Janhavi's Accident)
- 24 November 2014 (Janhavi's Pregnancy)

=== Special episode ===
==== 2 hours ====
- 20 October 2013 (Shree-Janhavi's Marriage)
- 24 January 2016 (Shree-Janhavi's Child)

== Adaptations ==
Language	Title	Original release	Network(s)	Last aired	Notes
Marathi	Honar Soon Mi Hya Gharchi होणार सून मी ह्या घरची	15 July 2013	Zee Marathi	24 January 2016	Original
Telugu	Neneu Aayana Aruguru Athalalu నేనేయు ఆయన అరుగు అథళాలు	24 February 2014	Zee Telugu	27 September 2014	Remake
Kannada	Shrirasthu Shubhamasthu ಶ್ರೀರಸ್ತು ಶುಭಮಸ್ತು	22 September 2014	Zee Kannada	2 July 2016	Remake
Hindi	Satrangi Sasural सतरंगी ससुराल	3 December 2014	Zee TV	26 March 2016	Remake

== Awards ==
Zee Marathi Utsav Natyancha Awards
Year	Category	Recipient	Role	Ref.
2013	Best Series	Mandar Devsthali	Producer	
2013	Best Family	Gokhale Family		
2013	Best Actor	Shashank Ketkar	Shree	
2013	Best Actress	Tejashri Pradhan	Janhavi	
2013	Best Couple	Tejashri Pradhan-Shashank Ketkar	Janhavi-Shree	
2013	Best Negative Character	Asha Shelar	Shashikala	
2013	Best Father	Manoj Kolhatkar	Sadashiv	
2013	Best Mother	Suhita Thatte	Narmada	
2013	Best Supporting Male	Atul Parchure	Mr. Borkar	
2013	Best Comedy Female	Leena Bhagwat	Sharayu	
2013	Best Mother-in-law		Janhavi's Mother-in-laws	
2014	Best Series	Mandar Devsthali	Producer	
2014	Best Actress	Tejashri Pradhan	Janhavi	
2014	Best Couple	Tejashri Pradhan-Shashank Ketkar	Janhavi-Shree	
2014	Best Negative Character	Asha Shelar	Shashikala	
2014	Best Daughter-in-law	Janhavi	Tejashri Pradhan	
2014	Best Supporting Male	Laxmikant	Prasad Oak	
2015	Best Mother-in-law		Janhavi's Mother-in-laws	
2015	Best Character Female	Rohini Hattangadi	Bhagirathi	
2015	Best Negative Character	Asha Shelar	Shashikala	
