= Sameer Vidwans =

Indian filmmaker

- Born: Sameer Sanjay Vidwans; 24 September
- Occupations: Film director; writer
- Known for: Anandi Gopal; Satyaprem Ki Katha
- Spouse: Juilee Sonalkar (m. 2024)

Sameer Vidwans is an Indian film director and writer known for his work in Marathi cinema. He won the Filmfare Awards Marathi for Best Director for Anandi Gopal. He won the 57th Maharashtra State Film Award for Best Director, and the film also won the National Film Award for Best Film on Other Social Issues.

Vidwans made his directorial debut with the film Time Please and in 2023, he made his Bollywood debut with the romantic drama film Satyaprem Ki Katha starring Kartik Aaryan and Kiara Advani.

== Filmography ==
Key
†	Denotes films that have not yet been released

As director

Year	Work	Genre	Role	Language	Notes / Ref.
2013	Lagna Pahave Karun	Film	Writer	Marathi	
2013	Time Please	Film	Director	Marathi	Directorial debut
2015	Double Seat	Film	Director, Writer	Marathi	
2015	Lokmanya: Ek Yugpurush	Film	Actor as Gopal Ganesh Agarkar	Marathi	
2016	YZ	Film	Director	Marathi	
2016	Pasant Aahe Mulgi	TV series	Writer	Marathi	
2017	Mala Kahich Problem Nahi	Film	Director, Writer	Marathi	
2017	Yolo	Web series SonyLIV	Director	Marathi	
2019	Anandi Gopal	Film	Director	Marathi	National Film Award for Best Film on Other Social Issues; Maharashtra State Film Award for Best Social Film
2020	Dhurala	Film	Director	Marathi	
2020 / 2021	Samanatar; Season 1, 2	Web series MX Player	Director	Marathi	
2023	Satyaprem Ki Katha	Film	Director	Hindi	
2025	Tu Meri Main Tera Main Tera Tu Meri	Film	Director	Hindi	
2026	Waiting Hai	Web series on Amazon MX Player	Director	Hindi	

== Awards ==
Film	Award	Category	Result	Notes	Ref.
Anandi Gopal	Pune International Film Festival	Sant Tukaram Best International Marathi Film	Won		
Anandi Gopal	Zee Chitra Gaurav Puraskar 2020	Best Film	Nominated		
Anandi Gopal	Zee Chitra Gaurav Puraskar 2020	Best Director	Nominated		
Anandi Gopal	Filmfare Marathi Awards 2020	Best Film	Won		
Anandi Gopal	Filmfare Marathi Awards 2020	Best Director	Won		
Anandi Gopal	67th National Film Awards	Best Film on Other Social Issues	Won	Shared with producers Essel Vision Productions	
Anandi Gopal	Mata Sanman 2021	Best Film	Won		
Anandi Gopal	Mata Sanman 2021	Best Director	Won		
Dhurala	Filmfare Marathi Awards	Best Director	Nominated		
