= Oli Ki Suki =

2017 Indian Marathi-language film

- Theatrical release poster
- Directed by: Anand Dilip Gokhale
- Produced by: Vaibhav Uttamrao Joshi
- Starring: Tejashree Pradhan; Sanjay Khapare; Bhargavi Chirmule
- Cinematography: Yogesh Prabhakar Rajguru
- Edited by: Sanket Jyoti Arvind
- Music by: Mayuresh Madhav Joshi
- Release date: 26 May 2017
- Country: India
- Language: Marathi

Oli Ki Suki is a 2017 Indian Marathi-language film directed by Anand Dilip Gokhale. Produced by Vaibhav Uttamrao Joshi, the film stars Tejashree Pradhan, Sanjay Khapare, Bhargavi Chirmule and Sharvari Lokhare. Mayuresh Joshi composed the music with cinematography by Yogesh Rajguru. It was released theatrically on 26 May 2017.

== Synopsis ==
A bunch of underprivileged children invest their time in petty theft. However, their lives change forever when Radhika, a philanthropist, walks into their lives.

== Cast ==
- Tejashree Pradhan as Radhika Deshpande
- Chinmay Sant as Kiran aka Hadkya
- Sanjay Khapare
- Bhargavi Chirmule
- Sharvari Lokhare
- Suhas Shirsat
- Varsha Usgaonkar
- Subodh Bhave

== Release ==
=== Theatrical ===
Oli Ki Sukhi was theatrically released on 26 May 2023.

=== Home media ===
The film was digitally released on 4 January 2024 on Ultra Jhakaas.

== Reception ==
=== Critical response ===
The reviews that the film received were generally not flattering. Ganesh Matkari of Pune Mirror wrote "Perhaps, with a better plot and a lot more grey shades, Oli Ki Suki could have been a much better film". Keyur Seta from Cinestaan.com says "Overall, Oli Ki Suki is a film with good intentions and has a few moving moments. But the few positives are clearly overshadowed by the many negatives". A reviewer from Maharashtra Times says "'Oli Ki Suki' feels like a documentary due to the lack of integration of elements required for cinema. As a result, even if the subject is good, it is wasted simply because the treatment is not good enough". Shalaka Nalawade from The Times of India wrote "'Rest of the established actors are mere caricatures of their characters, including a dying mother, an angry disabled father, as well as a vengeful police inspector. Skip this one".
