= Lagna Pahave Karun =

2013 Marathi film

- Theatrical release poster
- Directed by: Ajay Naik
- Written by: Kshitij Patwardhan; Sameer Vidwans
- Screenplay by: Kshitij Patwardhan; Sameer Vidwans
- Story by: Ajay Naik
- Produced by: Kiran Deshpande; Mohan Damle; Sanjeev Langarkande
- Starring: Mukta Barve; Umesh Kamat
- Cinematography: Abhijeet Abde
- Edited by: Suchitra Sathe
- Music by: Ajay Naik
- Production company: Solariz International
- Distributed by: Sprint Art Creations
- Release date: 4 October 2013
- Running time: 122 minutes
- Country: India
- Language: Marathi

Lagna Pahave Karun (transl. A try on marriage) is a 2013 Indian Marathi-language romantic comedy film directed by Ajay Naik, and produced by Kiran Deshpande and Mohan Damle under the banners of Solariz International and Sprints Arts Creations respectively.

The film stars Umesh Kamat and Mukta Barve; it is the third collaboration between Kamat and Barve after Eka Lagnachi Dusri Goshta (2012) and also features Tejashri Pradhan and Siddharth Chandekar. The film follows Aditi Tilak (Barve) and Nishant Barve (Kamat) who set up a matrimonial agency based on modern principles rather than horoscopes.

The soundtrack and background score were composed by Ajay Naik while the cinematography, art direction, and editing were handled by Abhijeet Abde, Padmanabh Damle and Suchitra Sathe respectively. The film was released on 4 October 2013.

== Plot ==
This tale of love and self-discovery follows the journey of Nishant Barve, an Indian software designer residing in America. Nishant loses his job in the United States during a visit to his homeland, India. Determined to inform his fiancée, Madhura Godbole, about his predicament, Nishant sets out to meet her. However, a chance encounter alters his path when he accidentally bumps into Aditi Tilak, an aspiring entrepreneur with dreams of establishing her own matrimonial agency.

Aditi shares her ambitious plans with Nishant, who becomes captivated by the idea and decides to forgo his scheduled job interview in the US. Meanwhile, Praful Patel and his girlfriend offer their assistance to Aditi in her venture. Nishant and Aditi, along with their newfound associates, brainstorm innovative ideas for helping people find love and companionship, opting not to rely on horoscope matching. Thus, the matrimonial agency "Shubhvivaah" is born.

Through Shubhvivaah, Rahul Kulkarni and Aanandi, two individuals seeking life partners, find each other and decide to marry. The unconventional approach of the agency gains popularity, drawing interest from many. However, on the day of Rahul and Aanandi's wedding, Nalini Dixit, a renowned astrologer and the owner of a successful marriage bureau in Pune, delivers a disheartening prediction: their horoscopes do not align, and their marriage is destined to last no more than six months. Undeterred, Nishant and Aditi remain steadfast in their belief, while secretly falling in love with each other.

Nishant takes a leap of faith and proposes to Aditi, expressing his willingness to sacrifice a promising career and a luxurious life in America for her and her incomplete matrimonial agency proposal. Aditi acknowledges Nishant's unparalleled love but admits that she hasn't contemplated their future together. Meanwhile, Rahul and Aanandi encounter difficulties in their married life due to Aanandi's inflexibility. Despite Nishant and Aditi's efforts to guide Rahul in making Aanandi happy, their attempts prove futile. One fateful day, Rahul and Aanandi have a heated argument, resulting in Rahul getting involved in an accident.

Riddled with guilt over the failure of Rahul and Aanandi's marriage, Aditi decides to shut down her marriage institution. Angered by Aditi's decision, Nishant voices his disappointment and disagreement, ultimately deciding to return to America. However, a transformative moment occurs when Aanandi realizes her mistakes and reconciles with Rahul. In a twist of events, Nishant discovers Aditi's painful past—losing both her parents and experiencing the tragic demise of two prospective grooms. Blamed for these misfortunes, Aditi lives in constant fear and insecurity, hesitant to accept Nishant's marriage proposal out of concern for his well-being.

Realizing the depth of Aditi's emotional turmoil, Nishant urges her to let go of her past and consider embracing marriage, whether with him or someone else, in order to find contentment. The film concludes with Nishant and Aditi sharing a heartfelt embrace, symbolizing Aditi's acceptance of Nishant's proposal, as they embark on a new journey together.

== Cast ==
- Mukta Barve as Aditi Tilak, owner of the matrimonial agency "Shubhvivaah"
- Umesh Kamat as Nishant Barve, Aditi's love interest and partner in ownership of "Shubhvivaah"
- Siddharth Chandekar as Rahul Kulkarni, he gets married with Aanadi through Shubhvivaah
- Tejashri Pradhan as Aanandi Rahul Kulkarni, Rahul's wife
- Swati Chitnis as Nalini "Nallutai" Dixit, an astrologer who is against Shubhvivaah
- Jayant Sawarkar as Aditi's grandfather, he is an astrologer
- Manasi Magikar as Nishant's mother
- Seema Chandekar as Rahul's mother
- Umesh Damle as Nishant's father
- Shrikar Pitre as Praful Patel, Aditi and Nishant's assistant
- Sayali Deodhar as Pinky, Praful's girlfriend, Aditi and Nishant's assistant
- Priyanka Barve as Madhura Godbole, Nishant's ex-fiancé
- Rahul Navel as Vitthhal, Aditi and Nishant's assistant

== Production ==
Lagna Pahave Karun was produced by Kiran Deshpande and Mohan Damle under the banner of Solariz International and Sprints Arts Creations respectively. It was co-produced by Sanjeev Langarkande and Ashish Deshpande and written by Kshtij Patwardhan and Sameer Vidwans based on a story by Ajay Naik.

The film was shot at various locations in Pune and Alibaug.

Umesh Kamat was the first to sign onto the film. Mukta Barve was chosen in as the female lead. Siddharth Chandekar and Tejashree Pradhan were later signed on for pivotal roles. Pradhan and Chandekar play Aanadi and Rahul, respectively. Swati Chitnis also played a vital role in the film.

== Reception ==
Daily News and Analysis wrote about the film "Clever writing, well-etched out characters, witty dialogue and brilliant performances make this film a fun watch". Indian Nerve stated that "Lagna Pahave Karun is the story of enduring and making things work without faltering". The film received 3.5 stars from Marathistars.com. Rajshri Marathi also wrote good reviews about the film.

== Soundtrack ==
Lagna Pahave Karun

Soundtrack album to Lagna Pahave Karun by Bela Shende Shaan Shankar Mahadevan Kunal Ganjawala Akriti Kakar
- Released: 28 August 2013
- Recorded: 2012–2013
- Genre: Feature film soundtrack
- Language: Marathi
- Label: Everest Entertainment Pvt. Ltd.

The music for Lagna Pahave Karun is composed by Ajay Naik. Ajay Naik has also composed the original background score. The lyrics are penned by Ambarish Deshpande, Ajay Naik, Vaibhav Joshi, Kshitij Patwardhan. The soundtrack which included seven songs was released on 28 August 2013 by Everest Entertainment.

Track listing
No.	Title	Lyrics	Music	Singer(s)	Length
1.	"Reshami Bandhane"	Ambarish Deshpande	Ajay Naik	Bela Shende	4:28
2.	"Jaanta Ajaanta (Male)"	Ajay Naik	Ajay Naik	Shaan	4:51
3.	"Majhya Mana"	Vaibhav Joshi	Ajay Naik	Shankar Mahadevan	5:24
4.	"Tu Shwaas Sare (Male)"	Ambarish Deshpande	Ajay Naik	Kunal Ganjawala	5:00
5.	"Jaanta Ajaanta (Female)"	Ajay Naik	Ajay Naik	Bela Shende	4:51
6.	""Kasa Ha Majha Saajna""	Ajay Naik; Kshitij Patwardhan	Ajay Naik	Akriti Kakkar	4:33
7.	"Tu Shwaas Sare (Female)"	Ambarish Deshpande	Ajay Naik	Bela Shende	5:00
Total length:					34:07

== Awards and nominations ==
Year	Award	Category	Nominee	Result
2014	Screen Marathi Awards	Best Actress	Mukta Barve	Nominated
