= YZ (film) =

- Theatrical release poster
- Directed by: Sameer Vidwans
- Written by: Kshitij Patwardhan
- Produced by: Sanjay Chhabria; Anish Joag
- Starring: Sagar Deshmukh; Akshay Tanksale; Parna Pethe; Sai Tamhankar
- Cinematography: Sudhakar Reddy Yakkanti
- Edited by: Faisal-Imran
- Music by: Rishikesh, Saurabh & Jasraj
- Production companies: Everest Entertainment; Pratisaad Productions
- Distributed by: Eros International
- Release date: 12 August 2016
- Running time: 165 minutes
- Country: India
- Language: Marathi

YZ is a 2016 Indian Marathi-language Coming of an age comedy romantic drama film directed by Sameer Vidwans and produced by Sanjay Chhabria and Anish Joag under the Everest Entertainment and Pratisad Productions banner respectively.

The film stars Sagar Deshmukh, Akshay Tanksale, Parna Pethe, Sai Tamhankar and Mukta Barve in lead roles.

== Plot ==
Gajanan Kulkarni (Sagar Deshmukh) a 33-year old history professor from Wai, Maharashtra who is still a virgin and very shy in talking with girls who is due to get married, eventually ends up in Pune for a temporary lecturer in University, Where he befriends 18-Year old student nicknamed Battees (Akshay Tanksale) who is very famous in college for his confident attitude. He opens him up to a new world around him. Battees teaches him about various nautorious things a man should know of his age. While staying with his aunt(mother's sister) in Pune, She arranges a marriage proposal for him with a girl Parnarekha (Sai Tamhankar), Both get involved into each other but soon Gajanan realizes that she is not of his type as she is very devotional and narrow minded. Gajanan breaks-up with Parnarekha saying that she is more bore than him. Meanwhile, he meets Antara (Parna Pethe) who is a best friend of Gaja's cousin sister Aarti. Antara requests Gaja to teach him Sanskrit Language as per her college syllabus. Antara falls for Gajas innocence and proposes him, Awestruck Gaja doesn't know what to do as he has never experienced such feelings for him before from anyone. Though he too has fantasies about Antare. Still confused about Antara, he tries to sort this out. Meanwhile, while visiting Battees place to speak about his problems he meets his childhood friend and love Sayali (Mukta Barve) in the opposite building who is a single mother and is currently with one of her friend after divorce with Rahul. Gaja confesses about his feeling which he had/has for her. Sayali now confused doesn't know what to do. Sayali gives him an old box containing a bucket list of things which Gaja had written when he was a child, realizing that he has done nothing till date from the list. Parnarekha who has now changed after guidance by Battees, she has transformed herself according to Gaja & meets him at his college on his last day. Gaja arranges Sayali's marriage with her friend with whom she was in live-in relationship, which is attended by Parnarekha, Antara, Battees & his beloved people. Gaja tells Parnarekha that he needs to leave. He tells Antara that she is very important to him but he cannot go ahead with their relationship. He says goodbye to Battees. Now a changed man Gajanan sits in the cab for airport concluding that he is going to finish his bucket list. Finally he realises that he can stay happy with what he is and have control over his desires.

== Cast ==
- Sagar Deshmukh as Gajanan Kulkarni
- Akshay Tanksale as Shyamsundar "Battees" Paarijaatak
- Mukta Barve as Sayali
- Parna Pethe as Antara
- Sai Tamhankar as Parnarekha
- Kaumudi Walokar as Arati

== Release ==
The film was released on 12 August 2016.

The film had its world television premier on 11 December 2016 on Star Pravah.
