= Buldana Urban Cooperative Credit Society =

Indian credit union

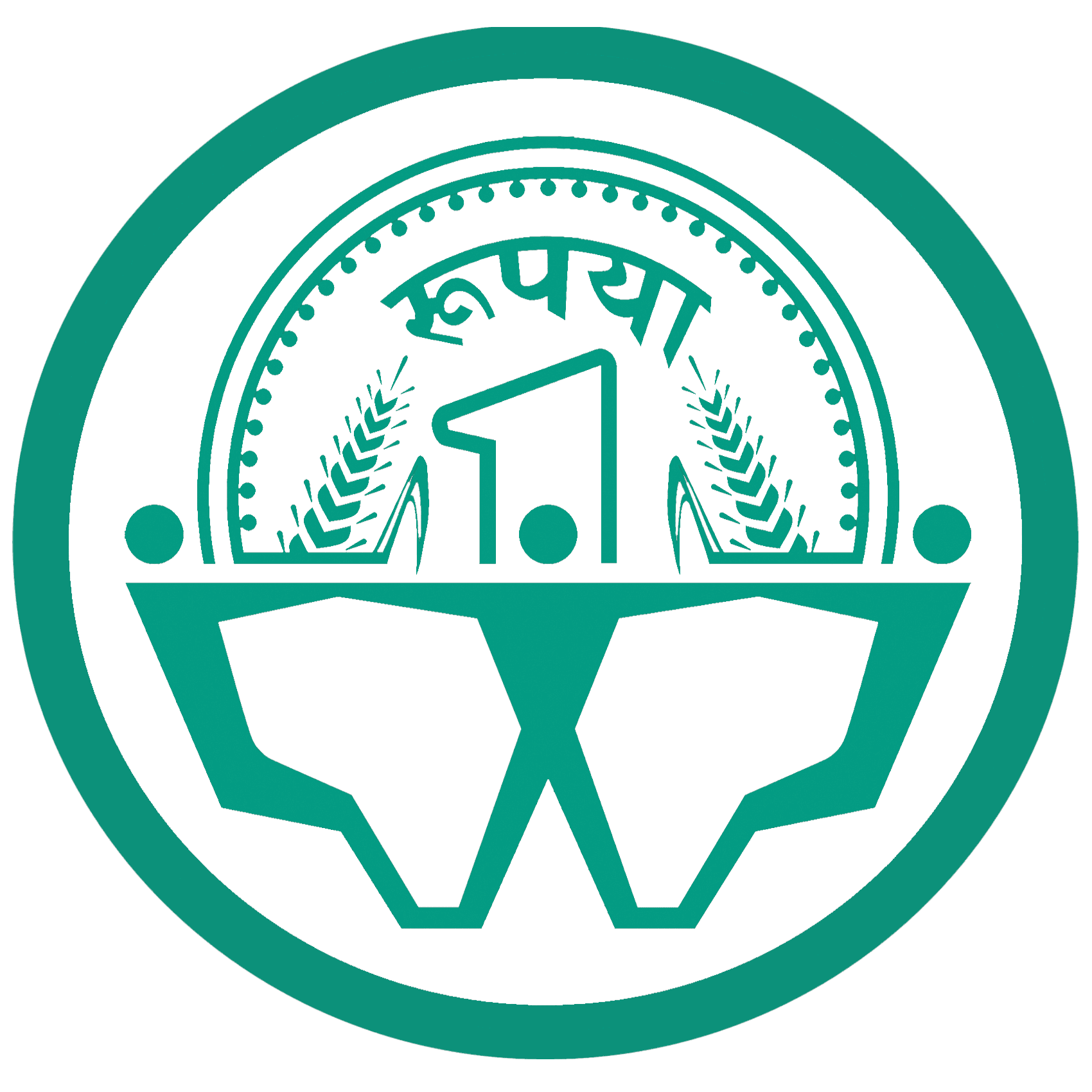
- Buldana Urban Logo
- Type: Credit Union
- Industry: Banking; Financial services
- Founded: 15 August 1986
- Headquarters: Buldana, Maharashtra, India
- Area served: India
- Key people: Sukesh Zamwar (Managing Director)
- Products: consumer banking, corporate banking, finance and insurance, investment banking, mortgage loans, private banking, savings, Securities, asset management, wealth management, credit cards, general insurance
- Revenue: ▲₹64,845,595,458 (US$690 million)(2013)
- Net income: ▲₹516,186,822 (US$5.5 million) (2013)
- Owner: Members of Buldana Urban
- Number of employees: 5000 (2013)
- Website: buldanaurban.net

Buldana Urban Cooperative Credit Society was formed on 15 August 1986. Chairman (Mr.) Radheshyamji Chandak started it with a capital of 210 USD and 72 members. In a span of 27 years and mainly in last decade under managing director Dr Sukesh Zamwar, the Credit Society has grown to size of 1.1 billion dollar business with more than half a million (700,000) membership. The area of operation is mainly in central and western India in four states of India. Now the society has 333 branches and 5000 employee and 300 warehouses. The total build up area for Warehouse is 5,000,000 sq feet and capacity of 435,000 metric tons. It maintains a presence in most of the metro cities of India and also in rural areas.

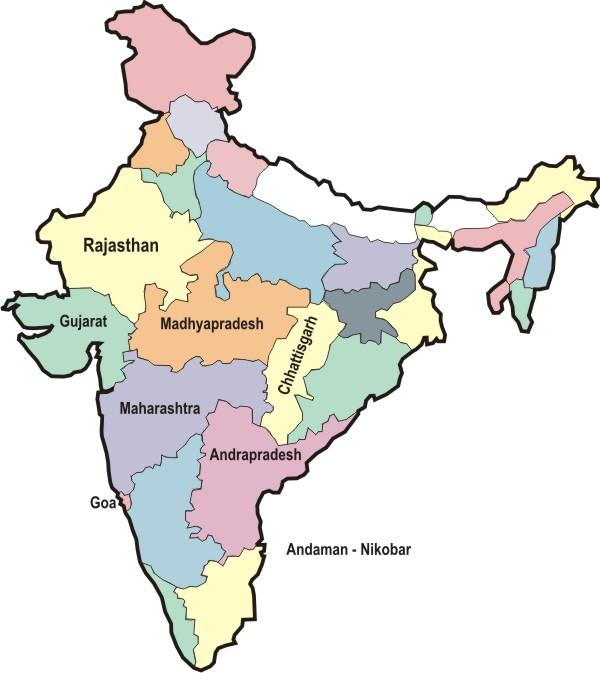
Working area of buldana Urban.

== Awards and achievements ==
- Credit union Micro Finance innovation award given by the Asian Confederation of Credit Union in Manila by International Cooperative Alliance Chairman Pauline Green.
- Best cooperative credit society award by Apex body of Indian cooperative, National Cooperative Union of India in 2008 and in 2013.
- Managing director of Buldana Urban Cooperative Credit Society becomes chairman of International Cooperative Alliance Asia pacific Youth Committee.
- India coordinator of Asian Confederation of Credit Unions.
- World Corporate Excellence Award
- Banking frontiers 2014 – Best Youth CEO Award

== Activities ==
The co-operative society business activities mainly are in warehouse loan business, gold loan business, industrial finance, infrastructure finance business, housing loan and vehicle loans, individual loan business, and education loans. Lending is not to be the sole business of any credit union; it must do something for members.

The Credit Society's principles, or breakout innovations are:

1. Four Pillar System – all the money in the world goes to banks.
2. Social banking – people's money should be utilized for well being of people.

== Technology use ==
To handle business for its 700,000 customers scattered in four states and 5,000 employees, its branches are connected by a core banking network, a data center and core banking software. It provides facilities for debit card, internet banking and mobile valet to customers, as well as real time money transfer and online warehousing. In India, the banking sector is still lagging behind the developed world, so to reach unbanked people in Buldana Urban, it has started a mobile banking van.

The society has a tie up with Yes Bank for a doorstep service, called Nano Teller, through which the society's employee provide customers to deposit or withdraw up to ₹10,000 from their savings account. In 2012, the service was started in Pune.

== Buldana Urban Industries ==
Buldana and its subsidiaries run many industries

1. Pharmaceutical company manufacturing anticancer drugs
2. Mineral water plant
3. Cleaning and grading units at warehouses with day packing facility
4. Sugar factory
5. Milling of pulses
6. Soybean Seed plant
7. Village development programs
8. Buldana Urban Credit Care
9. Safety And Security Company
10. Buldana Urban Charitable Trust
