= Chitale Bandhu Mithaiwale =

Indian snack company

Chitale Bandhu
- Trade name: Chitale Bandhu Mithaiwale
- Company type: Private
- Industry: FMCG | Food Industry
- Founded: Pune, Maharashtra, India in 1950 by Raghunathrao (Bhausaheb) Chitale. Bhilavdi, Sangli, Maharashtra
- Founder: Raghunathrao Chitale
- Products: Sweets, Snacks & Savouries.
- Website: www.chitalebandhu.in

Chitale Bandhu is an Indian snacks enterprise based in Maharashtra. It was founded by Raghunath Bhaskar Chitale and Narsinha Bhaskar Chitale in 1950 as a subsidiary of the Chitale Group of Industries. Its first outlet was set up in Bajirao Road, Pune. Although its outlets are limited to major cities of Maharashtra, the products are distributed all across India. Chitale Bandhu has been known for making namkeen (especially bakarwadis) and sweets. The brand menu consists of over sixty kinds of sweets and forty kinds of namkeen. The enterprise has an average turnover of around 2 billion rupees with around 2,000 to 2,500 customers shopping every day.

== History ==
=== Early years ===
In the mid-1930s, Bhaskar Ganesh Chitale, also known as B.G. Chitale, was an ordinary milk businessman located in a small village of Limbgaon situated in the Satara district of Maharashtra. Due to an unexpected turn of events, his cattle fell prey to an unknown disease resulting in their death. This caused a major loss in the business owned by the Chitale Family.

In 1939, Chitale founded the Chitale Group of industries by starting his first enterprise, Chitale Dairy. The brand quickly gained reputation for its quality after it expanded its reach after Raghunath Rao Chitale aka "Bhau Chitale" (son of B. G. Chitale) set up a shop in Mumbai, Maharashtra in partnership.

In 1946, the partnership came to an end and Raghunath Rao Chitale had to leave Mumbai. He then moved to Pune and along with his brother Narsinha started vending milk supplied to him from Bhilawadi in Palus, Maharashtra. The business became a success in the city and in the year 1950 he bought a 500 square feet shop where he set up a new enterprise, Chitale Bandhu Mithaiwale.

=== Introduction of Bakarwadi ===
Chitale Bandhu started the sale of bakarwadi in 1970. Due to the growth of demand, the enterprise installed machines to maintain the original shape and size of the bakarwadi.

In the early nineties, the sale of bakarwadi was around 300 kg (660 lb) a day. Currently, the enterprise sells about 3,000 kg (6,600 lb) of the snack daily. Introduction of bakarwadi in Chitale Bandhu's shop increased the sales of the enterprise to a great extent. This growing demand for the new snack was fulfilled after Narsinha Chitale toured Japan in the 1970s. With the introduction of new technology, the enterprise adopted a semi-automatic production of bakarwadi in 1989.

In the following years Chitale Bandhu started opening multiple branches around Pune.

== Products ==
=== Snacks and namkeen ===
Chitale Bandhu has over 40 varieties of Namkeen sold at multiple outlets. Some of the common and widely sold Namkeen include: bakarwadi, chivda, farsan, gathi, papri chat, sev, and shankarpali. Chitale Bandhu also sells chaat products such as samosa and kachori.

==== Bakarwadi ====
Chitale Bandhu has been known for selling bakarwadi since the early 1970s. Although this snack was originally made in Gujarat, it gained popularity in Maharashtra when it was introduced. “In 1970, a person from Surat, Gujarat introduced Bhausaheb to the bakarwadi,” said Indraneel Chitale, one of Bhausaheb’s grandsons. It has been a part of traditional west Indian cooking, particularly Gujarati farsaan, for a long time. But without Bhausaheb Chitale and the rapid growth of India’s packaged food industry, bakarwadi may not have been as popular among Indians both in the country and abroad. Many sources, such as NDTV foods, believe that although the enterprise was performing well in the sweets sector, after the introduction of bakarwadi in the menu, its sales increased rapidly. NDTV foods also referred to this snack as a "bronzed snack". With the technological change, the organisation made the production of bakarwadi automatic, which allowed it to boost the production of bakarwadi. This increased the sale of bakarwadis from 300 kilos a day in 1970, to over 3000 kilos a day in 2012.

==== Shev ====
A large variety of shev is available at Chitale Bandhu, such as:

- Tikhat Jad (spicy and thick) Shev
- Sadhi (Normal-sized) Shev
- Zero-sized Shev
- Masala Shev
- Palak (Spinach) Shev
- Tomato Shev

==== Chivda ====
The enterprise has also been known for selling variety of chivda, such as:

- Poha (Flattened rice) Chivda
- Maka (Corn) Chivda
- Potato Chivda
- Namkeen Mix

=== Sweets ===
There are over 60 sweets on the menu of the enterprise. The sweets that are sold include: various types of halva (such as almond and pineapple flavour), burfi, sweet rolls, peda, Laddu and Jalebi (also pronounced as "Jilebi" ).

==== Burfi ====
A list of burfi which are sold at Chitale Bandhu include:

- Kaju Katali
- Anjir (Fig) Burfi
- Pista Burfi
- Malai Burfi

==== Rolls (sweet) ====
The enterprise has various flavours of roll which include: Gulkand, mango, anjir, and cashew-apple.

== Controversy ==
In 2017, the workers of Chitale Bandhu, went on a strike who demanded a hike in their salaries. Following the labor court's order, the workers returned to work on 1 October 2017. However, according to the workers, they were not given a professional treatment after re-joining. Many of them stated that they were made to sit idle in the working hours. One of the employee, Vandana Ughade, claimed that the doors of the workplace were also closed to confine the workers in. Indraneel Chitale, the owner of the enterprise in 2017, countered all the claims by stating that the workers were left idle because the production itself was low due to the preceding strike.
