= Bakarwadi =

Indian savory snack

Bhakarwadi
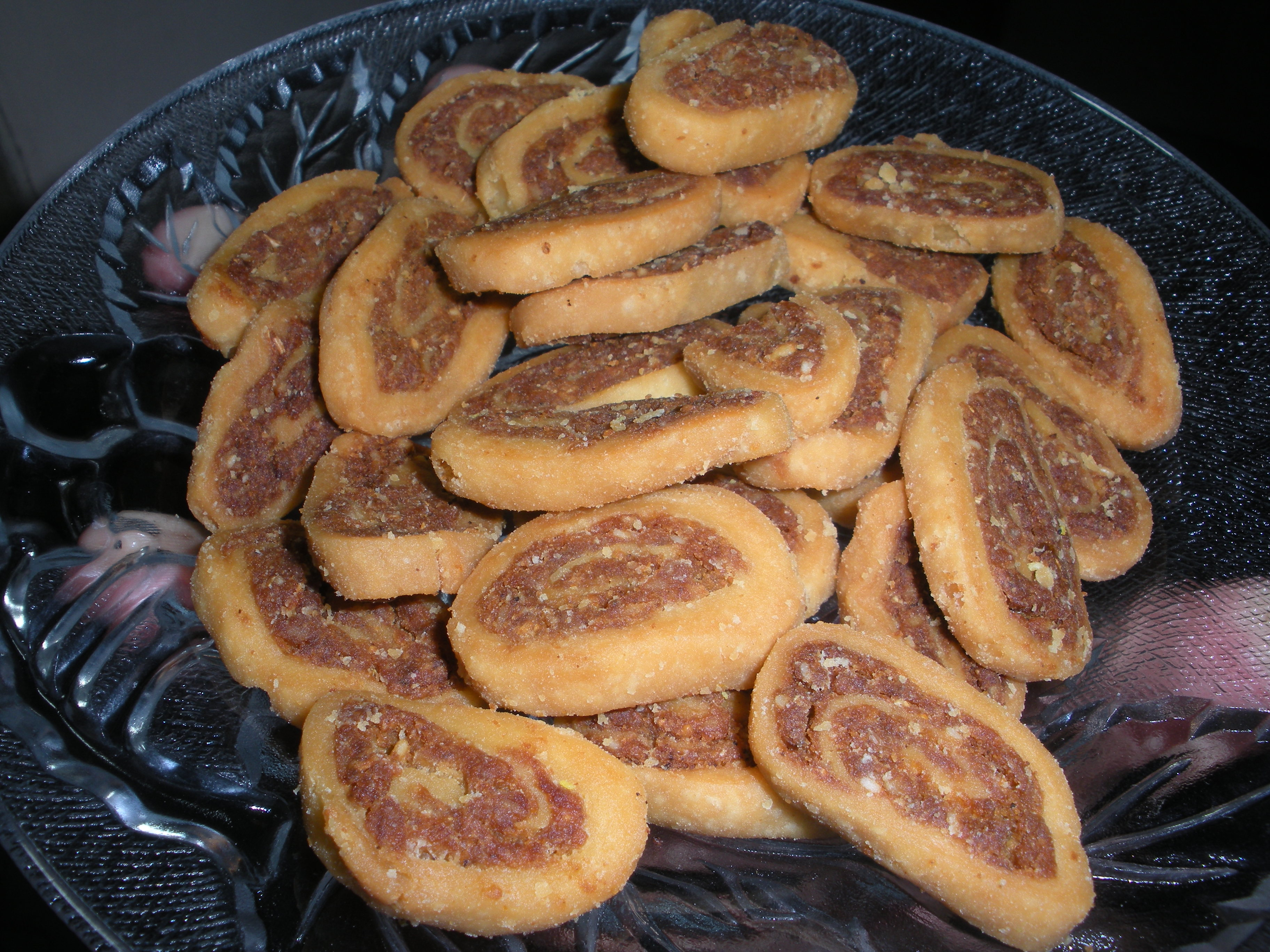
- Serving of bakarwadi
- Alternative names: Bhākarwadi, Bhākharwadi
- Course: Snack
- Place of origin: India
- Region or state: Gujarat and Maharashtra
- Main ingredients: Gram flour, coconut, poppy seeds

Bhakarwadi is a traditional crispy, deep-fried, disc-shaped, sweet and spicy snack popular in the western cities of Pune, Maharashtra and Vadodara, Gujarat in India. It was already popular before 1960 when these were not Gujarat or Maharashtra states; they were both a part of Bombay State, and both cultures added their own flavors to each other's recipes.

== History ==
The only difference was that the neighbor made a "Nagpuri" variant of the snack. Popularly known as pudachi vadi, this "Nagpuri" variant was an extremely spicy roll, whereas the Gujarati staple snack had more garlic and onions. The amalgamation of the spicy pudachi vadi and the shape of Gujarati bakarwadi is the Chitale bakarwadi.

This Chitale-Bakarwadi was launched in the market in 1976.

== Recipe ==
Bakarwadi is made from gram flour dough made into spirals stuffed with a mixture of coconut, poppy seeds and sesame seeds. It is then fried until it gets crispy.

== See also ==
- List of snack foods from the Indian subcontinent
