= Jasraj Jayant Joshi =

Indian playback singer

Jasraj Joshi
- Born: Jasraj
- Genre: Playback singing
- Occupations: Singer, Composer
- Instrument: Vocalist
- Years active: 2012–present

Jasraj Joshi is an Indian playback singer. He has sung songs in Hindi, Marathi and in some other Indian languages, however he is most active in the Marathi film industry.

== Career ==
He won Idea Sa Re Ga Ma Pa 2012, a televised singing contest. The 29-year-old defeated Ludhiana-based Shenaz Akhtar, Jaipur's Mohammad Aman, and Mumbai-based Vishwajeet Borwankar to win the title.

He has made performances in television, and various festivals in the light music and film music for last 9 years.

== Film singing ==
He has sung songs in various films. Some of the films are:

- Majha naav shivaji (Marathi)
- Satrangi Re (Hindi)
- Highway (Marathi)
- Double Seat (Marathi)
- Phuntroo
- Online Binline (Marathi)
- Partu (Marathi)
- Rustom (Hindi)
- Michi Maja Vyalo (Marathi)
- Baap Re Baap (Gujarati; 'Father O Father!')
- Bhootam Bhayyam (Marathi)
- Adkitta (Marathi)
- Dashami (Marathi)

=== Non-film songs ===
Year	Song	Co-singer(s)
2016	Machal Machal Ke	Pankaj Kumar
