= Time Please =

- Theatrical release poster
- Directed by: Sameer Vidwans
- Written by: Kshitij Patwardhan
- Based on: Nava Gadi Nava Rajya by Kshitij Patwardhan
- Starring: Priya Bapat; Siddharth Jadhav; Umesh Kamat; Sai Tamhankar
- Cinematography: Abhijit D. Abde
- Edited by: Suchitra Sathe
- Music by: Hrishikesh Kamerkar
- Production companies: Pratisaad Productions & 24 Carat Entertainment
- Distributed by: Everest Entertainment Pvt. Ltd.
- Release date: 26 July 2013
- Running time: 131 minutes
- Country: India
- Language: Marathi

Time Please is a Marathi romantic comedy drama film released on 26 July 2013. This film is directed by Sameer Vidwans and produced by Pratisaad Productions and 24 Carat Entertainment. It is loosely based on the play Nava Gadi Nava Rajya with Umesh Kamat and Priya Bapat reprising their roles.

== Cast ==
- Umesh Kamat as Hrushikesh Deshpande
- Priya Bapat as Amruta Sane-Deshpande
- Siddhartha Jadhav as Himmatrao Dhondepatil
- Sai Tamhankar as Radhika Dabholkar
- Vandana Gupte as Mandodari Kulkarni
- Seema Deshpande as Shubhada Sane
- Madhav Abhyankar
- Girija Prabhu

== Synopsis ==
Amruta, 24 is a bubbly girl who's married to Hrishi, 30, a matured man. She is lively and loud while he is composed and subtle. Just after the marriage they start to discover the differences between their liking, expressions and views. The real drama starts when Hrishi's colleague Radhika and Amruta's childhood buddy Himmatrao come in the picture.

Instantly the game of love, care, transparency and insecurities start. Undergoing this phase, they learn about their reactions. They understand how some small moments of truth, faith, anger and realization make huge differences to any relationship.

== Soundtrack ==
The music has been directed by Hrishikesh Kamerkar, while the lyrics have been provided by Kshitij Patwardhan.

=== Track listing ===
No.	Title	Length
1.	"Nava Gadi An Rajya Nava"	4:03
2.	"Aas Tu"	4:20
3.	"Butterfly Man"	5:02
4.	"Kadhi Na Kadhi"	5:23

== Accolades ==
Year	Ceremony	Category	Recipient	Result	Ref.
2013	51st Maharashtra State Film Award	Maharashtra State Film Award for Best Comedian	Siddharth Jadhav	Won	
