= Shamika Bhide =

Indian Marathi Singer (born 1994)

- Born: Shamika Shrikant Bhide; 15 February 1994 (age 32)
- Origin: Ratnagiri, Maharashtra, India
- Genres: Indian classical music
- Occupation: singer
- Instrument: Vocal
- Years active: 2008–present
- Label: Universal Music India

Shamika Bhide (born 15 February 1994) was a participant of the first season of the reality show Sa Re Ga Ma Pa Marathi Li'l Champs broadcast on Zee Marathi. She is from Ratnagiri, a district in Maharashtra. She was one of the twelve finalists of this show. During this show, she was most appreciated for 'lavanis', a type of Maharashtrian folk music. In 2010 she featured on the compilation album Aathva Swar.

== Background ==
Shamika was born in Ratnagiri to entrepreneurs Shrikant and Rashmi Bhide. During her school days Shamika competed and won awards in many district-level competitions. She started primary education in classical music under the guidance of Mugdha Bhat-Samant. She has also participated in Prashant Damle foundation contests.

From July 2008 until February 2009, at the age of 14, Shamika participated in the televised competition Sa Re Ga Ma Pa Marathi Li'l Champs on the Indian television channel Zee Marathi.

== Career ==
In 2008, Shamika auditioned for the Sa Re Ga Ma Pa Marathi Li'l Champs, a competitive music reality show broadcast by the Zee Marathi. She was one 50 finalists selected from several thousand children aged between 8 and 14 across Maharashtra. She made her way to the top 10 finalists. Shamika was referred to as the "Konkan Kanya" during the show.

=== Albums ===
- Aathava Swar composed by Varsha Bhave

=== Public appearances ===
- Shaniwarwada Kala Mahotsav, Pune
- Shravandhara by Yash Foundation, Ratnagiri
- Bhide Kul Samelan, Ganpatipule
- Ratnagiri Mahotsav, Ratnagiri
- Ratnagiri Pulotsav, Ratnagiri
- Utkrusht vammay nirmitee rajya purakar sohala, Ratnagiri
- Nashik Road-DevaLali Vyapari Bank, Deepmahotsav, Nashik
- Natya Samelan, Ratnagiri
- Shimagotsava, Goa
- Kojagar, Maharashtra Chitpavan Sangh, Pune
- Raunak City Kalyan live Concert (Diwali Celebration 2018 IGNIGHT)
- Jashn-e-Sukhan 2020
