= List of Marathi films of 2016 =

A list of films produced by the Marathi language film industry based in Maharashtra scheduled for release in the year 2016.

== Box office collection ==
Rank	Film	Production Studio (s)	Worldwide gross	Ref.
1	Sairat	Zee Studios; Aatpat Production; Essel Vision Productions	₹110 crore (US$11 million)	
2	Natsamrat	Fincraft Media and Entertainment Pvt. Ltd.; Gajanan Chitra; Great Maratha Entertainment	₹48 crore (US$5.0 million)–₹50 crore (US$5.2 million)	
3	Ventilator	Purple Pebble Pictures	₹25 crore (US$2.6 million)	

== January – March ==
Opening	Title	Director	Cast	Genre	Source
1 January	Natsamrat	Mahesh Manjrekar	Nana Patekar, Neha Pendse, Vikram Gokhale, Sunil Barve	Drama	
1 January	Mohar	Vijay Patkar	Prasad Oak, Aditi Sarangdhar, Sayaji Shinde, Vijay Arjun, Hemalata Bane, Vijay Kadam, Manasi Naik	Drama	
8 January	Lord Of Shingnapur	Raj Rathod	Milind Gunaji, Manoj Joshi, Varsha Usgaonkar	Drama	
8 January	Sarva Mangal Savadhan	Rahil Khan	Raqesh Vashisth, Manjari Fadnis	Action film, Romance film	
15 January	Friends	Ramana Madhesh	Swapnil Joshi, Sachit Patil, Nitesh Kalbande, Gauri Nalawade	Action, Drama, Romance	
15 January	Shasan	Gajendra Ahire	Makarand Anaspure, Bharat Jadhav, Siddharth Jadhav, Jitendra Joshi, Manava Naik, Vrinda Gajendra, Aditi Bhagwat, Vikram Gokhle, Nagesh Bhosle, Milind Shinde, Anjali Walsangkar, Ravindra Berde, Jayant Savarkar, Dr. Shriram Lagoo, Mohan Joshi, Kiran Karmarkar	Political drama	
15 January	702 Dixit's	Shankh Rajadhyaksha	Gauri Nigudkar, Pallavi Patil	Suspense thriller	
15 January	Chahato Mi Tula	Vishal Puwar	Meghan Jadhav, Shruti Marathe, Prasad Oak	Drama, Romance	
15 January	Chiranjeev	Ramesh More	Bharat Jadhav, Alka Kubal	Drama	
22 January	Guru	Sanjay Jadhav	Ankush Choudhary, Nitesh Kalbande Urmila Kanitkar	Action, Drama	
29 January	Bandh Nylon Che	Jatin Wagle	Subodh Bhave, Mahesh Manjrekar, Sanjay Narvekar, Shruti Marathe, Sunil Barve, Medha Manjrekar	Drama	
29 January	Athang	Milind Gawali	Milind Gawali, Tanvi Hegde	Drama	
29 January	Prem Kahani	Satish Randive	Faisal Khan, Kajal Sharma	Drama	
5 February	Marathi Tigers	Aavdhoot B. Kadam	Amol Kolhe, Ashish Vidyarthi, Nitesh Kalbande Vikram Gokhale, Kiran Sharad, Vidyadhar Joshi	Action, Drama	
5 February	Mumbai Time	Sushrut Bhagwat	Umesh Kamat, Mrunal Dusanis, Mahesh Manjrekar	Crime thriller	
5 February	Police Lines Ek Purna Satya	Raju Parsekar	Santosh Juvekar, Sayali Sanjeev	Drama	
12 February	Poshter Girl	Sameer Patil	Sonalee Kulkarni, Jitendra Joshi, Hrishikesh Joshi, Aniket Vishwasrao, Sandeep Pathak, Akshay Tanksale and Siddharth Menon	Comedy, Satire	
12 February	Jugaad	Mayur Vaishnav	Priya Gamre, Abhinav Paatekar	Comedy	
12 February	Shinma Yeda	Ashraf Khan	Nagesh Bhonsle, Jagdish Yemul, Seema Kulkarni	Comedy	
19 February	Sangharsh Yatra	Sakar Raut	Sharad Kelkar, Shilpa Gandhi, Shruti Marathe, Ashish Wadde, Omkar Karve, Girish Pardeshi	Based On Late Gopinath Munde	
19 February	Mr. and Mrs. Sadachari	Ashish Wagh	Vaibbhav Tatwawdi, Nitesh Kalbande Prarthana Behere	Action, Romance	
19 February	7 Roshan Villa	Akshay Datt	Tejaswini Pandit, Prasad Oak and Sonali Khare	Suspense thriller	
19 February	Ek Hoti Rani	Prasad Appa Tarkar	Aniket Vishwasrao, Minal Ghorpade	Comedy	
19 February	Vighnaharta Mahaganpati	Rajesh Chavan	Sameer Dharmadhikari, Priya Marathe	Drama	
26 February	Ticha Umbartha	Pradeep Ghonsikar	Chinmay Mandlekar, Tejaswini Pandit, Suyash Tilak, Jyoti Chandekar, Sheetal Shukla, Harsha Khandeparkar, Tulika Prakash Nikam, Bharat Sharma, Jayant Patekar, Aditi Sawant	Drama	
26 February	Babanchi Shala	R. Viraj	Sayaji Shinde, Aishwarya Narkar, Shashank Shende	Drama	
26 February	Aamchaya Nadi Lagu Naka	Urvarshi Kotyan	Shahid Tausif Sayyed	Drama	
4 March	Sarpanch Bhagirath	Ramdas Phutane	Mohan Agashe, Upendra Limaye, Veena Jamkar, Kishor Kadam	Drama	
11 March	Phuntroo	Sujay Dahake	Ketaki Mategaonkar, Madan Deodhar	Sci-Fi, Romance, Thriller	
11 March	Anuraag	Ambarish Darak	Mrunmayee Deshpande, Dharmendra Gohil	Drama	
18 March	Pinjra	V. Shantaram	Shriram Lagoo, Sandhya, Nilu Phule	Drama	Re-release in Dolby Digital
25 March	Well Done Bhalya	Nitin Kamble	Nandkumar Solkar, Ramesh Deo, Sanjay Narvekar, Alka Kubal, Sharad Ponkshe	Sports, Drama	

== April – June ==
Opening	Title	Director	Cast	Genre	Source
1 April	Kapus Kondyachi Goshta	Mrunalini Bhosale	Makarand Anaspure, Samidha Guru, Bharat Ganeshpure, Gauri Konge, Mohini Kulkarni, Netra Mali	Drama	
1 April	Rangaa Patangaa	Prasad Namjoshi	Makarand Anaspure, Sandeep Pathak	Drama	
8 April	Vrundavan	TLV Prasad	Raqesh Vashisth, Pooja Sawant, Vaidehi Parshurami, Ashok Saraf, Mahesh Manjrekar	Action, Comedy	
8 April	Reti	Suhas Bhosale	Chinmay Mandlekar, Kishor Kadam, Shashank Shende, Sanjay Khapare, Vidhyadhar Joshi, Gayatri Soham, Suhas Palshikar, Deepak Karanjikar, Mosami Tondwalkar, Bhagyashri Rane	Action, Thriller	
8 April	Sal	Ravindra Honrao, Durgesh Golipkar	Poonam Chavan, Mukesh Gaikwad, Vinita Sancheti, Umesh Mitkari, Prem Narsale, Kunal More, Sikandar Mulani	Drama	
8 April	Marathon Zindagi	Shakir -Inayat	Vikram Gokhale, Sanjay Narvekar, Girish Pardeshi, Anil Nagarkar, Sunil Godbole, Kishor Mahabole, Sushil Bhosale, Seema Kulkarni and Akshay Lonare	Drama	
15 April	Ek Kutub Teen Minar	Sunil Kamble	Bharat Jadhav, Vijay Chavan, Sanchit Yadav, Shyam Thombre, Poornima Vavhal, Amruta Deshmukh, Pooja Kadam Vijay Kadam, Gauri Kendre	Drama	
15 April	Ek Hota Valya	Sharadchandra Jadhav	Sharadchandra Jadhav, Priyanka Sasane	Drama	
22 April	Bho Bho	Bharat Gaikwad	Prashant Damle, Anuja Sathe	Comedy, Suspense thriller	
22 April	Premacha Jhol Jhal	Manoj Kotian	Siddharth Jadhav, Vijay Patkar, Navin Prabhakar, Smita Goondkar, Tejaswi Patil, Priya Berde	Comedy, Drama	
22 April	Mazhi Tapasya	Dr. Raj Mane	Makarand Deshpande, Milind Shinde, Namrata Gaikwad	Drama	
29 April	Sairat	Nagraj Manjule	Rinku Rajguru, Akash Thosar	Romance film, Drama	
20 May	Paisa Paisa	Joji Raechal Job	Sachit Patil, Spruha Joshi	Thriller	
20 May	Aart	Rajendra Sali, Datta Gaikar.	Sheetal Salunke, Santosh Mayekar, Ganesh Yadav, Jairaj Nair and Ajit Bhagat	Drama	
27 May	Majha Naav Shivaji	Pranita Pawar	Chakraborty, Siyaa Patil, Aditi Sarangdhar, Abhijeet Chavan, Ashwini Ekbote, Yogesh Sirshath	Romance film, Drama	
27 May	Laal Ishq	Swapna Waghmare Joshi	Swapnil Joshi, Anjana Sukhani, Sneha Chavan, Samidha Guru	Murder mystery	
3 June	Lalbaugchi Rani	Laxman Utekar	Veena Jamkar, Prathamesh Parab, Neha Joshi, Parth Bhalerao, Ashok Shinde, Nandita Dhuri, Kamlesh Sawant	Drama	
3 June	Youth	Rakesh Kudalkar	Akshay Waghmare, Neha Mahajan, Akshay Mhatre, Meera Joshi, Shashank Jadhav, Ketaki Kulkarni, Satish Pulekar and Vikram Gokhale	Drama, Thriller	
10 June	Vees Mhanje Vees	Uday Bhandarkar	Mrinmayee Godbole, Parth Bhalerao, Mrunal Jadhav, Shrirang Mahajan, Mihir Mule, and Arun Nalawade	Drama	
10 June	Cheater	Ajay Phansekar	Vaibbhav Tatwawdi, Pooja Sawant, Hrishikesh Joshi, Asawari Joshi, Suhas Joshi	Comedy, Horror	
10 June	Duniya Geli Tel Laavat	Pravin Raja Karale	Siddharth Jadhav, Mansee Deshmukh, Sammeer Sumantt, Yuugg, Dr. Girish Oak, Savita Prabhune, Uday Sabnis, Jayant Wadkar, Yogesh Shinde, Geeta Bagde, Priya Dhande and Supriya Nalwade	Drama	
10 June	Mazi Bayko Mazi Mehvani	Deepak Sharma	Siya Patil, Vilas Ujawane	Comedy, Drama	
12 June	Madhu Ithe An Chandra Tithe	Sanjay Zankar	Shashwati Pimplikar, Bhalchandra Kadam, Anand Ingle	Comedy	TV Release
17 June	Pindadaan	Prashant Patil	Siddharth Chandekar, Manava Naik, Paula McGlynn, Prasad Pandit, Sanjay Kulkarni, Madhav Abhyankar, Farida Daadi	Romance	
17 June	Bernie	Neelima Lonari	Tejaswini Lonari, Rajan Tamhane, Bhushan Patil, Girish Pardeshi, Savita Malapekar, Kiran Khoje, Sumukhi Pendase, Mousami Tondawalkar, Chaitrali Dongare, Raj Hasanalale and Radhika Deshpande.	Drama	
17 June	Barad	Tanaji Mahadeo Ghadge	Suhas Palshikar, Rajan Patil, Shahaji Kale, Bharat Ganeshpure, Sanjay Kulkarni, Nandkishor Chaughule	Drama	
24 June	Ganvesh	Atul Jagdale	Mukta Barve, Kishor Kadam and Smita Tambe	Drama	
24 June	Ekk Albela	Shekhar Sartandel	Mangesh Desai, Vidhyadhar Joshi, Prasad Pandit, Swapnil Rajshekhar, Vighnesh Joshi, Shekhar Phadke, Shriram Kolhatkar, Arun Bhadsavle, Vidya Balan	Biopic	
24 June	Damlelya Babachi Kahani	Yogesh Jadhav & Nitin Chavan	Sandeep Khare, Sanskruti Balgude, Kishor Kadam, Astad Kale, Dipti Bhagawat, Pravin Tarade, Jyoti Chandekar	Family drama	

== July – September ==
Opening	Title	Director	Cast	Genre	Source
1 July	Made in Maharashtra	Nitesh Pawar	Arun Nalawade, Jitu Goswami, Pravin Garje, Priya Gamre, Shital Gaikwad and Bhalchandra kadam	Drama	
1 July	Yaaro Ki Yaari	Vinay Bhargav	Ajit Salve, Ashmita Deshpande, Ashwini Bhave	Comedy, Drama	
15 July	Astu	Sumitra Bhave, Sunil Sukthankar	Mohan Agashe, Iravati Harshe, Amruta Subhash and Milind Soman.	Drama	Re-release
15 July	Kiran Kulkarni vs Kiran Kulkarni	Kanchan Adhikari	Subodh Bhave, Kranti Redkar	Comedy	
22 July	Half Ticket	Samit Kakkad	Vinayak Potdar, Shubham More, Priyanka Bose, Usha Naik, Bhalchandra Kadam	Drama	
22 July	And Jara Hatke	Prakash Kunthe	Mrinal Kulkarni, Indraneil Sengupta, Siddharth Menon and Shivani Rangole	Drama	
29 July	Lost and Found	Ruturaj Dhalgade	Siddharth Chandekar, Spruha Joshi, Mohan Agashe and Mangesh Desai	Romance, Drama	
29 July	35% Kathavar Pass	Satish Motling	Prathamesh Parab, Ayli Ghiya, Bhagyashree Shankpal, Yashoman Apte, Sanjay Narvekar, Madhavi Juvekar, Bharat Ganeshpure, Usha Nadkarni, Sushant Shelar, Neha Pendse	Romcom	
5 August	1234	Milind Arun kavade	Bhushan Pradhan, Priya Marathe, Sanjay Narvekar, Vijay Patkar, Pradeep Patwardhan, Ganesh Yadav, Vijay Kadam, Arun kadam, Vijay Maurya, Jaywant Wadkar, Aniket kelkar, Vishakha Subhedar, Teja Deokar, Sanjay Mone, Abhijit Chavan, Kishore Chougule, Anshuman Vichare, Kamalesh Sawant, Guru anand, Pranav Reware	Suspense Thriller	
5 August	Disco Sannya	Niyaz Mujawar	Parth Bhalerao, Sanjay Khapre	Comedy	
5 August	Taleem	Nitin Rokade	Abhijeet Shwetchandra, Vaishali Dabhade, Vishnu Joshilkar	Sports, Drama	
12 August	YZ	Sameer Vidwans	Sai Tamhankar, Parna Pethe, Akshay Tanksale	Comedy, Drama	
19 August	Chaurya	Sameer Asha Patil	Kishor Kadam, Milind Shinde, Ganesh Yadav and Pradeep Velankar	Suspense Thriller	
19 August	Toh Aani Mee Ek Runanubandh	Mukesh Malik	Subodh Bhave, Prasad Oak, Shweta Shinde, Girija Joshi	Drama	
26 August	Kanha	Avdhoot Gupte	Gashmeer Mahajani, Vaibbhav Tatwawdi, Gauri Nalawade	Drama	
26 August	I Am Not Slumdog I Am Indian	Yuugg	Usha Nadkarni, Uday Sabnis, Yuugg	Drama	
2 September	Aata Majhi Hatli	Mahendra Devlekar	Bharat Jadhav, Ruchita Jadhav	Romcom	
2 September	Faqt Tujhyach Sathi	Jaganath Rangdhol	Yash Kapoor, Siya Patil	Drama	
16 September	Photocopy	Vijay Maurya	Parna Pethe, Chetan Chitnis, Vandana Gupte	Romcom	
16 September	Yaari Dosti	Shantanu Anant Tambe	Akash Waghmode, Hansraj Jagtap, Ashish Gade, Mitali Mayekar, Sumit Bhokase, Shreyas, Sandeep Gaikwad, Nisha Parulekar, Namrata Jadhav, Ashok Pawade	Romcom	
23 September	One Way Ticket	Amol Shetge	Gashmeer Mahajani, Sachit Patil, Amruta Khanvilkar, Neha Mahajan, Shashank Ketkar	Suspense, Thriller	
23 September	Mr & Mrs Unwanted	Dinesh Anant	Rajendra Shisatkar, Smita Gondkar	Drama	
30 September	A Dot Com Mom	Meena Nerurkar	Vikram Gokhale, Meena Nerurkar	Drama	

== October – December ==
Opening	Title	Director	Cast	Genre	Source
7 October	Jaundya Na Balasaheb	Girish Kulkarni	Girish Kulkarni, Sai Tamhankar, Manva Naik, Mohan Joshi, Reema Lagoo	Comedy	
7 October	Family Katta	Chandrakant Kulkarni	Vandana Gupte, Sai Tamhankar, Dilip Prabhavalkar, Kiran Karmarkar, Prateeksha Lonkar, Gauri Nalawade, Alok Rajwade, Sachin Deshpande, Sulekha Talwalkar	Comedy, Drama	
7 October	Bole India Jai Bhim	Subodh Nagdeve	Shyam Bhimsaria, Sukanya Kulkarni, Jeetendra Doshi	Drama	
14 October	Ghantaa	Shailesh Shankar Kale	Amey Wagh, Saksham Kulkarni, Aroh Welankar, Shivani Surve, Pushkar Shotri, Murli Sharma, Kishor Kadam	Thriller Comedy	
14 October	Prem Sankat	Datta Mirkute	Raj Surwade, Monalisa Bagal, Rahul Bhise, Ankita Parmar	Romcom	
21 October	Jalsa	Ashutosh Raj	Bharat Ganeshpure, Ashutosh Raj, Nikhil Wairagar, Sagar Karande, Abhijit Chavan, Girija JoshiJoshi	Comedy, Drama	
21 October	Kaul Manacha	Bhimrao Mude	Amruta Patki, Rajesh Shringarpure, Sameer Dharmadhikari, Vijay Gokhale, Vijay Chavan, Jaywant Wadkar, kamlesh Sawant, Shweta Pendse, Maushumi Tondwalkar, Varsha Dandale	Comedy, Drama	
21 October	Nivdung	Munavar Shamim Bhagat	Bhushan Pradhan, Sanskruti Balgude, Sara Shravan, Astaad Kale, Prajakta Dighe and Shekhar Phadke	Drama	
4 November	Ventilator	Rajesh Mapuskar	Ashutosh Gowariker, Jitendra Joshi, Sukanya Kulkarni, Sukanya Kulkarni, Nikhil Ratnaparkhi, Abhijeet Chavan	Drama	
11 November	Vazandar	Sachin Kundalkar	Sai Tamhankar, Priya Bapat, Siddharth Chandekar, Chirag Patil and Chetan Chitnis	Comedy, Drama	
18 November	Kaul - A Calling	Aadish Keluskar	Rohit Kokate, Deepak Parab, Makrand Kajrekar, Saudamini Tikle	Realistic fiction	
2 December	Bhootkaal	Anil Waghmare	Bhushan Pradhan, Hemangi Kavi	Horror	
3 December	Tathastu	Sahil Aabhay Tandel	Sandeep Pathak, Madhavi Nimkar	Silent Horror	TV Release
9 December	Kshitij	Manouj Kadaamh	Upendra Limaye, Vaishnavi Tangde, Manoj Joshi, Vidyadhar Joshi, Sanjay Mone, Kanchan Jadhav, Rajkumar Tangde, Arnav Mandrupkar and Akansha Pingale.	Drama	
9 December	Nagpur Adhiveshan	Nilesh Raosaheb Jalamkar	Ajinkya Deo, Mohan Joshi, Makarand Anaspure, Bharat Ganeshpure, Vinit Bhonde, Chetan Dalvi, Amol Taale, Sankarshan Karale, Dipali Jagtap, Sneha Chavhan	Comedy, Drama	
9 December	Gulmohar	Sandesh Gaikwad	Bhushan Pradhan, Mrunmayee Deshpande	Drama	
9 December	Tu Bold Mee Cold	Rahul Pathak	Anup Belwalkar, Seva More, Shilpa Pathak, Pooja Bhatjire, Siddharth Shah	Romcom	
