= Aanandi Joshi =

Indian playback singer

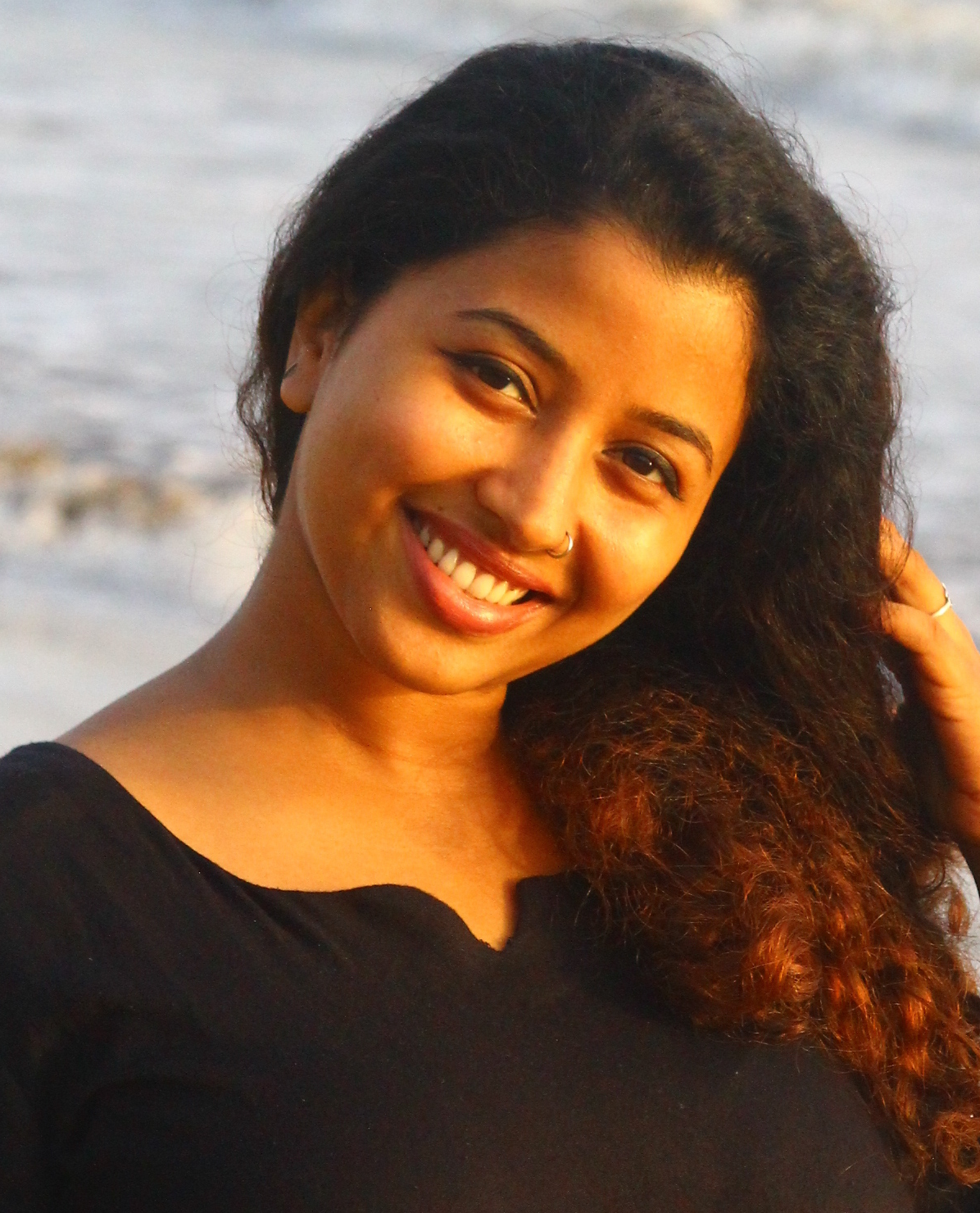
- Joshi in 2018
- Born: Bombay, Maharashtra, India
- Occupation: Playback singer
- Years active: 2006–present
- Spouse: Jasraj Jayant Joshi (m. 2023)
- Musical career
- Genres: classical, pop, filmi
- Instrument: Vocals

Aanandi Joshi is an Indian playback singer who predominantly sings for Marathi films. She has received several awards, including a Filmfare Award Marathi, two Zee Chitra Gaurav Puraskar, a MFK Award and a Maharashtra State Film Award for the best female playback singer.

== Career ==
Her career gained momentum after her participation in Zee Marathi’s music reality show Sa Re Ga Ma Pa Marathi, where her singing talent was noticed by a wider audience. This exposure allowed her to pursue opportunities in playback singing, live performances, and music albums.

She has worked with several composers and singers, contributing to Marathi films, television shows, and theatrical productions. Some of her collaborations include notable music directors such as A. R. Rahman, Hariharan, Ashok Patki, Amitraj, Taufiq Qureshi, Avadhoot Gupte, Nilesh Moharir and Kaushal Inamdar. In 2011, she released her debut solo album Aanandi, which was composed by Mithilesh Patankar, a music arranger and composer.

Joshi has also performed at various cultural and music festivals, including the Maharashtra State Film Awards 2012, Pulotsav in Pune, and the Mumbai Festival. These events have showcased her ability to perform in diverse musical settings, ranging from traditional to contemporary compositions.

Her journey in music began during her college years, where she participated in intercollegiate and inter-university competitions, earning recognition for her performances. She won multiple awards at youth festivals and music competitions, representing Ramnarain Ruia College and the University of Mumbai.

== Discography ==
=== Films ===
No.	Year	Film	Song	Co-singer	Composer	Ref.
1	2006	Anandache Jhaad	"Butkyanchya Deshat"		Ashok Patki	
2	2010	Ved Laavi Jeeva	"Mi Tula"		Bapi–Tutul	
3	2010	Ved Laavi Jeeva	"Dhinchyak Dhinchyak Kara"		Bapi–Tutul	
4	2010	Ved Laavi Jeeva	"Por Parkari"		Bapi–Tutul	
5	2011	Dubhang	"Tu Aanik Mi"		Bapi–Tutul	
6	2011	Dubhang	"He Divas Sukhache"		Bapi–Tutul	
7	2011	Raja Shivchhatrapati	"Zulva Palana"		Ashok Patki	
8	2012	Ajintha	"Chaitacha Rang Sang"	Priyanka Barve	Kaushal Inamdar	
9	2012	Ajintha	"Jari Maza Tuza"		Kaushal Inamdar	
10	2013	Duniyadari	"Deva Tujhya Gabharyala"	Adarsh Shinde; Kirti Killedar	Amitraj	
11	2013	Narbachi Wadi	"Shabay Shabay"	Adarsh Shinde	Mangesh Dhakde	
12	2013	Asa Mee Ashi Tee	"Jind Merie"		Amitraj	
13	2013	Mee Ani U	"Jallosh Talacha"		Avinash–Vishwajeet	
14	2014	Sangharsh	"Aik Jara"		Bapi–Tutul	
15	2014	Misal Pav			Bapi–Tutul	
16	2014	"Zale Ase Kase"			Bapi–Tutul	
17	2014	Priyatama	"Tujhya Roopacha Chandana"	Prasanjeet Kosambi	Chaitanya Adkar	
18	2014	Cappuccino	"Barsun Yeh"		Sahil Kulkarni	
19	2014	Ishq Wala Love	"Tu Disata"	Swapnil Bandodkar	Avinash–Vishwajeet	
20	2014	Ishq Wala Love	"Tu Nasata"	Solo	Avinash–Vishwajeet	
21	2014	Ishq Wala Love	"Bhui Bhijali"		Avinash–Vishwajeet	
22	2014	Pyaar Vali Love Story	"Bawari"	Jaideep Bagwadkar & Sandeep Patil	Amitraj	
23	2014	Candle March	"Sahar Sahar"		Amitraj	
24	2014	Zari	"Hirwya Gara"		Pravin Kunvar	
25	2015	Double Seat	"Kiti Sangaychay Mala"	Jasraj Jayant Joshi	Jasraj-Saurabh-Rishikesh	
26	2015	Wanted Bayko No. 1	"Tujhe Khatyaal Dole"		Pravin Kunvar	
27	2015	Varhadi Vajantri	"Jeev Maza Jaltoy Ha"		Avi Lohar	
28	2015	Online Binline	"Haralo Viralo"	Hrishikesh Ranade	Nilesh Moharir	
29	2015	A Paying Ghost	"Raat Bhar"		Narendra Bhide	
30	2015	Shortcut	"Tuch Tu"		Prem Anand	
31	2015	Dagadi Chawl	"Dhaga Dhaga"		Amitraj	
32	2015	Katyar Kaljat Ghusali	"Sur Niragas Ho"		Shankar–Ehsaan–Loy	
33	2015	Urfi	"Yaar Bas Tu"		Chinar-Mahesh	
34	2015	Mumbai-Pune-Mumbai 2	"Band Baja"		Avinash–Vishwajeet	
35	2016	One Way Ticket	"Reshami Reshami"		Gaurav Dagaonkar	
36	2016	Vrundavan	"Aaj Premachi"		Amitraj	
37	2016	Cheater	"Man Majhe"	Sonu Nigam	Abhijeet Narvekar	
38	2016	Family Katta	"Ek Sohala Nirala"		Mangesh Dhakde	
39	2016	Kanha	"Mitraa"	Adarsh Shinde; Rohit Raut	Avadhoot Gupte	
40	2016	Pindadaan	"He Mann Jhale Tujhe"		Sagar Dhote	
41	2016	1234	"Bolna"		Amitraj	
42	2017	Hrudayantar	"Vate Vari"		Praful Karlekar	
43	2017	Happy Birthday	"Tu Yetana Samori"		Vikrant Warde	
44	2017	Bhetali Tu Punha	"Jaanu Jaanu"		Chinar-Mahesh	
45	2017	Bhetali Tu Punha	"Harvu Jara"		Chinar-Mahesh	
46	2017	Mala Kahich Problem Nahi	"Tuzya Sathi"		Jasraj-Saurabh-Rishikesh	
47	2017	Anaan	"Gandhi Sugandhi"		Saurabh-Durgesh	
48	2017	Maza Algaar	"Thamb Na"		Saurabh-Durgesh	
49	2017	Muramba	"Aga Aik Na"		Shailendra Barve	
50	2018	Atrocity	"Aala Bai Tarunya"		Raamlaxman	
51	2018	Truckbhar Swapna	"Luklukle Swapna"		Shreyashh	
52	2018	Ranangan	"Sakhya Re"		Amar Mohile	
53	2018	Hrudayat Vaje Something	"Tuzi Odh Lagali"	Aniruddha Kale		
54	2018	Bedhadak	"Bedhadak"		Pravin Bandkar	
55	2018	Yuntum	"Gara Gara"		Chinar-Mahesh	
56	2018	Mumbai Pune Mumbai 3	"Kuni Yenar Ga"		Nilesh Moharir	
57	2018	Naal	"He Daryavata"		AV Prafullachandra	
58	2019	College Diary	"Palke"		Niranjan Pedgaonkar	
59	2019	Berij Vajabaki	"Kshan Ha Virala"		Abhijeet Narvekar	
60	2019	Judgement	"Tujhya Sobatila"		Naval Shastri	
61	2019	Thapadya	"Najuk Kaya Attar Faya"		Pankaj Padghan	
62	2019	Thapadya	"Avari Bhavati Chawat"		Pankaj Padghan	
63	2019	Miss U Mister	"Tuzi Aathavan"		Aalap Desai	
64	2019	Malaal	"Zara Suno"		Shail Hada	
65	2020	Online Guru	"Online Guru"		Rohan-Rohan	
66	2020	Bamfaad	"Munasib"		Vishal Mishra	
67	2020	Anandi Gopal	"Anand Ghana"		Jasraj-Saurabh-Rishikesh	
68	2020	Dhurala	"Kaakan Kinkin"		AV Prafullachandra	
69	2021	Meenakshi Sundareshwar	"Mann Kesar Kesar"		Justin Prabhakaran	
70	2021	Hashtag Prem	"Thoda Thoda"		Pravin Kuwar	
71	2022	Tamasha Live	"Rang Lagala"	Amitraj	Amitraj	
72	2022	The Legend	"Hui Meri Raahein"	Solo	Harris Jayaraj	
73	2022	The Ghost	"Jahan Jhukti Hain Baadal"	Solo	Bharatt Saurabh	
74	2022	Tadka	"Ajnabiji"	Solo	Anup Rubens	
75	2022	Panghrun	"Satrangi Jhala Re"	Pawandeep Rajan	Pawandeep Rajan	
76	2022	Bhirkit	"Line De Mala"	Nakash Aziz	Shail-Pritesh	
77	2022	Sita Ramam	"Aise Dhale Raat Re"	Shivam Pathak	Vishal Chandrashekhar	
78	2022	Sita Ramam	"Aaja Sajna"	Solo	Vishal Chandrashekhar	
79	2022	Sita Ramam	"Khwaab Tere"	Neha Shitole	Vishal Chandrashekhar	
80	2022	We2	"We 2"	Solo	Manmaan Mishra	
81	2022	Respect	"Dehatlya Doha Madhe"	Rupali Moghe	Praful Swapnil	
82	2022	Sunny	"Maza Sobati"	Siddharth Mahadevan	Souumil-Siddharth	
83	2023	TDM	"Man Majha Malhari"	Vaibhav Shirole	Vaibhav Shirole	
84	2023	Ravrambha	"Ek Raav, Ek Rambha"	Adarsh Shinde	Amitraj	
85	2023	Ravrambha	"Majhya Davnila"	Solo	Amitraj	
86	2023	Autograph	"Ogha Oghani"	Jasraj Jayant Joshi	Jasraj-Saurabh-Rishikesh	
87	2023	Tuza Durava	"Sparsh Zhala"	Solo	Shridhar Atrayya	
88	2023	Jogira Sara Ra Ra	"Babua"	Suvarna Tiwari	Hitesh Modak	
89	2023	Sari	"Sammohini"	Solo	Amitraj	
90	2023	Phulrani	"Tuzya Sobatiche"	Swapnil Bandodkar	Nilesh Moharir	
91	2023	Phulrani	"Beautiful Rani"	Avadhoot Gupte	Varun Likhate	
92	2023	Rangiley Funter	"Man Zhale Baware"	Solo	Raja Ali	
93	2023	Do Gubbare	"Woh Adhure Khwaab"	Solo	Saurabh Bhalerao	
94	2023	Gadkari	"Tujhyat Pahile Me"	Solo	Radhika Basuri	
95	2023	Jhimma 2	"Butti Maar"	Amitraj	Amitraj	
96	2024	Sridevi Prasanna	"Asech Asel Ka"	Harshvardhan Wavare	Amitraj	
97	2024	Bai Ga	"Chand Thambla"	Abhay Jodhpurkar	Varun Likhate	
98	2024	Ek Daav Bhootacha	"Vajnaar Ga, Gajnaar Ga"	Avadhoot Gupte	Gaurav Chati	
99	2024	Paani	"Nachnaara"	Adarsh Shinde	Gulraj Singh	
100	2025	Fussclass Dabhade	"Dis Sarale"	Harshvardhan Wavare	Amitraj	
101	2025	GauriShankar	"Sukh Aale"	Kunal Ganjawala	Prashant-Nishant	
102	2025	Ata Thambaycha Naay!	"Ata Thambaycha Naay! Title Track"	Ajay Gogavale	Gulraj Singh	
103	2025	Shastra	"Social Media"	Siddharth Bhavsar, Mehul Surti	Mehul Surti	
104	2025	Gulkand	"Chanchal"	Rohit Raut	Avinash–Vishwajeet	
105	2025	Chhaava	Backing vocals	Sumedha Karmahe, Aasa Singh, Sudeep Jaipurwale, Sana Aziz, Nakul Abhyankar, Sarthak Kalyani	A.R. Rahman	
106	2025	Parinati	"Swapna"	Solo	Praful Swapnil	
107	2025	Aarpar	"Hoshil Na"	Solo	Gulraj Singh	
108	2025	Tu Meri Poori Kahani	"Kuch Toh Hai"	Anu Malik, Shweta Bothra	Anu Malik	
109	2025	Asambhav	"Bahar Nava"	Abhay Jodhpurkar	Amitraj	
110	2025	Sirai	"Mannichiru"	Sathyaprakash	Justin Prabhakaran	
111	2026	Gandhi Talks	"Jara Jara Man Khulavate"	Abhay Jodhpurkar	A. R. Rahman	
112	2026	Super Duperr	"Nach Danana"	Adarsh Shinde	Abhinay Jagtap	
113	2026	Salbardi	"Manjula"	Solo	Padmanabh	
114	2026	Tumbadchi Manjula	"Nabh Soneri Soneri"	Solo	Saurabh Bhalerao	
115	2026	Premala Conditions Apply	"Jantar Mantar"	Solo	Nupoora Niphadkar	
116	2026	Ek Hota Malin	"Sajna Ra Sajna"	Solo	Yuvraj Gongle	
117	2026	Batwara 1947	"Dekhiye Jahaan Jaiye Kahin"	Javed Ali, Rabbani Mustafa Khan	A. R. Rahman	
118	2026	Adkitta	"Ajvar Hote"	Deepika Jog	Hrishikesh Datar	

=== Television ===
Year	Title	Composer	Co-artist	Ref.
2007	Lajjatdar	Ashok Patki	Solo	
2012	Great Gruhini	Ashok Patki	Solo	
2013	Tuza Maza Jamena	Sameer Saptiskar	Aarti Shenoi, Mahesh Manjrekar, Sameer Saptiskar	
2013	Durva	Nihar Shembekar	Rohit Raut	
2014	Lagori - Maitri Returns	Nilesh Moharir	Solo	
2014	Jawai Vikat Ghene Aahe	Shashank Powar	Vaishali Samant	
2016	Tujhyat Jeev Rangala	AV Prafullachandra	Solo	
2018	Aamhi Doghi	Nilesh Moharir	Neha Rajpal	
2019	Sindhu	Shashank Powar	Solo	
2019	Rang Majha Vegla	Nilesh Moharir	Solo	
2021	1962: The War in the Hills	Hitesh Modak	Sukhwinder Singh	
2024	Bhumikanya	Kunal-Karan	Solo	
2024	Tu Bhetshi Navyane	Shailendra Barve	Abhay Jodhpurkar	
2024	Lagnanantar Hoilach Prem	Avinash–Vishwajeet	Solo	
2026	Shubh Shravani	Kunal-Karan	Solo	
2026	Pathrakhin	Aashay Parab	Solo	

== Awards and nominations ==
Year	Award	Category	Work	Result
2015	Maharashtracha Favourite Kon?	Favourite Female Singer	Double Seat	Won
2016	Filmfare Awards Marathi	Best Playback Singer - Female	Double Seat	Won
2016	Filmfare Awards Marathi	Best Playback Singer - Female	Dagadi Chawl	Nominated
2016	Zee Chitra Gaurav Puraskar	Best Playback Singer - Female	Double Seat	Won
2017	Filmfare Awards Marathi	Best Playback Singer - Female	Hrudayantar	Nominated
2017	Zee Chitra Gaurav Puraskar	Best Playback Singer - Female	Hrudayantar	Nominated
2017	Maharashtracha Favourite Kon?	Favourite Female Singer	Muramba	Nominated
2020	Zee Chitra Gaurav Puraskar	Best Playback Singer - Female	Anandi Gopal	Won
2021	Filmfare Awards Marathi	Best Playback Singer - Female	Tamasha Live	Nominated
2020	Maharashtra State Film Awards	Best Female Playback Singer	Anandi Gopal	Nominated
2021	Maharashtra State Film Awards	Best Female Playback Singer	Kali Maati	Nominated
2022	Mirchi Music Awards Marathi	Female Vocalist of the Year	Dhurala	Won
2023	Fakt Marathi Cine Sanman	Best Playback Singer - Female	Tamasha Live	Won
2024	Sakal Premier Awards	Best Female Playback Singer	Autograph	Won
2024	Maharashtra State Film Awards	Best Female Playback Singer	Rangiley Funter	Won
