= Paach Futacha Bachchan =

2026 Indian Marathi-language film

- Directed by: Kaustubh Ramesh Deshpande
- Written by: Kaustubh Ramesh Deshpande
- Produced by: Rahul Karnik
- Starring: Shruti Madhudeep; Gauri Nalawade; Kshitish Date; Shashank Shende; Chinmayee Sumeet; Pushkaraj Chirputkar
- Cinematography: Abhishek Shete
- Edited by: Sourabh Prabhudesai
- Music by: Niranjan Pedgaonkar
- Production company: Orpheus Studios
- Distributed by: AA Films
- Release date: 9 October 2026
- Running time: 139 minutes
- Country: India
- Language: Marathi

Paach Futacha Bachchan (transl. The Five-Foot Bachchan) is a 2026 Indian Marathi-language drama film written and directed by Kaustubh Ramesh Deshpande and produced by Rahul Karnik under the banner of Orpheus Studios. An adaptation of Deshpande's experimental one-person stage play of the same name, the film stars Shruti Madhudeep in her feature film debut, reprising her role from the play, alongside Gauri Nalawade, Shashank Shende, Chinmayee Sumit, Kshitish Date and Pushkaraj Chirputkar.

Set against the backdrop of Maharashtra's kirtan and Warkari traditions, it follows a young, five-foot-tall female kirtankar from Kolhapur whose fiery Kolhapuri-dialect discourses earn her the nickname "Paach Futacha Bachchan". The film was theatrically released on 9 October 2026 through AA Films, receiving an overall positive response from critics and audiences.

== Plot ==
Rajlaxmi "Raju" Jadhav, a young woman from a family of kirtankars, becomes a popular kirtan performer in rural Maharashtra. Her knowledge of the abhangas of the Varkari saints, sharp wit and distinctive Kolhapuri dialect earn her widespread recognition. Despite being only five feet tall, she becomes known as "Paach Futacha Bachchan", a nickname referencing Amitabh Bachchan.

Rajlaxmi frequently clashes with Ranga Bagdi Maharaj, a rival kirtankar. She hires Prasad Kumbhar, a videographer, to record her performances and create social media reels, which contribute to her growing popularity. The two eventually fall in love. However, as her career begins to decline, Rajlaxmi ends their relationship and marries Purushottam, the son of an influential family, a decision that helps revive her career. Purushottam subsequently becomes possessive and attempts to control her. Following a quarrel, Rajlaxmi refuses to abandon her kirtans and releases a video publicly alleging that certain people are attempting to prevent her from performing. It follows her struggle against the pressures of fame, wealth, politics and family, as she navigates her personal and professional life.

== Cast ==
- Shruti Madhudeep as Rajlaxmi "Raju" Jadhav
- Gauri Nalawade as Vijaya, Rajlaxmi's sister
- Kshitish Date as Purushottam
- Shashank Shende as Rajlaxmi's father
- Chinmayee Sumeet as Radhabai, Rajlaxmi's mother
- Kishor Kadam as Ranga Bagdi Maharaj
- Pushkaraj Chirputkar as Rajlaxmi's personal assistant
- Aashay Kulkarni as Prasad Kumbhar
- Omprakash Shinde as Santosh
- Sameer Patil as Purushottam's father
- Vinod Vanve as Pran, Rajlaxmi's make-up artist
- Shyamraj Patil as Rajlaxmi's maternal uncle

== Production ==
=== Development ===
The film originated from Paach Futacha Bachchan, an experimental solo play written by Kaustubh Ramesh Deshpande and directed and performed by Shruti Madhudeep. Produced by Rom Rom Rangmanch and Orpheus Studio, the play had its opening performance on 5 February 2023 at Yashwantrao Chavan Natya Gruha. Following the play's positive reception, Deshpande decided to adapt it into a feature film, and according to him, the team paused its stage performances at an appropriate point to begin work on the film.

Madhudeep, a trained Kathak dancer, reprised her role from the play, describing the film adaptation as a dream come true.

=== Filming ===
Principal photography took place over roughly a year at locations including Sangole, Mangalwedhe, Pandharpur, Khadakwasla, Pune and Kolhapur.

== Soundtrack ==
The film's soundtrack was composed by Niranjan Pedgaonkar, with lyrics penned by Pradeep Awate. The soundtrack draws on traditional kirtan and devotional music.

Track listing
| No. | Title | Singer(s) | Length |
|---|---|---|---|
| 1. | "Deva Panduranga" | Aanandi Joshi | 3:25 |
| 2. | "Tadmad Jhala" | Adarsh Shinde | 2:18 |
| 3. | "Any Doubt Ajun Shanka" | Radha Khude | 2:07 |
| Total length: | | | 7:50 |

== Marketing and release ==
The film's first teaser poster was unveiled on social media in July 2026, on the occasion of Ashadhi Ekadashi. The poster featured a young female kirtankar surrounded by Warkari devotees, highlighting the film's association with Vitthal devotion and the kirtan tradition. Shruti Madhudeep was revealed as the lead actor in August 2026, followed by the release of the official teaser on 1 September 2026. The film's approximately two-and-a-half-minute trailer was launched in late September 2026 in the presence of actor Riteish Deshmukh.

Paach Futacha Bachchan was released theatrically on 9 October 2026 and was distributed by AA Films.

== Reception ==
=== Critical response ===
Santosh Bhingarde of Sakal gave the film 3 stars, describing it as "this is a film that comments on the conflict between kirtan, spirituality, and professionalism." Rahul Shelke of Pudhari rated it 4 out of 5 stars, praising the balanced writing and stating, "He has combined the personal journey of Rajalakshmi with the reality of the world of Kirtana, village politics and social issues." Sabi Perera of Loksatta praised the film's theme and the performance of debutant Shruti Madhudeep, writing that she "has taken over the entire screen".

Ashish Ningurkar of Aapla Mahanagar credited the film's subject, screenplay and performances, writing, "This effort to enrich the tradition of content-rich and quality films in the Marathi cinema industry is certainly commendable." Sujit Shirke of Lokmat gave the film 3 out of 5 stars, noting, "The first half of the film is spent on character development, while the second half shows the consequences of 'Bachchan's' decisions."

=== Box office ===
The film had a slow start at the box office, reportedly due to ongoing protests and the Navaratri festival season, but gained momentum in its second week across central Maharashtra, with a release in the United States announced for the following week.
