= Gauri Nalawade =

Indian film actress (born 1987)

- Born: 11 August 1987 (age 39); Bombay, Maharashtra, India
- Occupation: Actress
- Years active: 2008–present

Gauri Nalawade (born 11 August 1987) is an Indian actress who primarily works in Marathi films and television. She is best known for her role as Vaidehi in the Star Pravah daily soap Swapnanchya Palikadle (2010–2014) and for her performance as a supportive wife in the acclaimed drama film Godavari (2021), which earned her the Zee Chitra Gaurav Puraskar for Best Supporting Actress.

She made her film debuth Friends (2016) and has since appeared in films including Kanha (2016), Family Katta (2016), Adham (2019), Tarri (2023), Gaav Bolavato (2025) and Vadapav (2025).

== Early life ==
Nalawade was born on 11 August 1987 in Mumbai, Maharashtra, and was raised in Navi Mumbai. She completed her schooling and later earned a Bachelor of Pharmacy degree from Bharati Vidyapeeth. During her school and college years, she participated in stage plays as well as drama and dance competitions, developing an interest in the performing arts that later led her to a career in acting.

== Career ==
Nalawade began her acting career on television with a supporting role in the Zee Marathi series Avaghachi Sansar, in which she replaced Kadambari Kadam as the sister of the lead female protagonist, played by Amruta Subhash, and also appeared with Sachin Pilgaonkar in a promotional advertisement for the television show Eka Peksha Ek.

Her breakthrough came in 2010, when she was cast in the lead role of Vaidehi in the Star Pravah daily soap Swapnanchya Palikadle. Starring opposite Chinmay Udgirkar, she portrayed a young woman from a wealthy family who marries into a middle-class household against her parents' wishes. The series was among Star Pravah's highest-rated programs during its run and concluded in June 2014. Nalawade's portrayal established her as a prominent name in Marathi television.

Following her success on television, Nalawade made her Marathi film debut in 2016 with Friends, a remake of the 1998 Tamil film Kannedhirey Thondrinal. She appeared alongside Sachit Patil and Swapnil Joshi, where her performance received positive critical attention for her screen presence. The same year she was seen in Avadhoot Gupte's action film Kanha, in which she played a gym instructor, and in Chandrakant Kulkarni's ensemble drama Family Katta, where she portrayed an actress.

After a gap four years, she returned to television with Zee Yuva's serial Sur Rahu De, opposite Sangram Salvi, but left the show within a few months owing to scheduling conflicts. The following year, she played an anti-mining activist who falls in love with a man involved in the mining mafia, played by Santosh Juvekar, in Adham. Her performance, along with Juvekar's, was well received. She also made a special appearance as a journalist in Chaitanya Tamhane's 2020 film The Disciple. Nalawade drew wider recognition for her role as a supportive wife in the drama film Godavari, directed by Nikhil Mahajan. The film was screened at several film festivals before its theatrical release and went on to receive positive reviews. Mihir Bhanage of The Times of India called her the "star of her scenes", adding "Her character is subtle yet strong and Gauri gets the nuances of playing a wife and mother right." For this performance she won the Zee Chitra Gaurav Puraskar for Best Supporting Actress.

In 2023, she was cast as the lead in the action film Tarri, alongside Lalit Prabhakar; it received a mixed response upon release. She was subsequently seen in Django JD (2023), Gaav Bolavato (2025) and Vadapav (2025), all of which met with mixed reviews. Reviewing the last of these, Sameer Ahire of Movie Talkies wrote, "Nalawade, despite the unconventional edge to her character, carries herself with confidence and poise."

== Filmography ==
=== Films ===
Key
†	Denotes films that have not yet been released

- All films are in Marathi unless otherwise noted.

Year	Title	Role	Notes	Ref(s)
2015	ReDraft	Meera	Hinglish short film	
2016	Friends	Bhairavi		
2016	Kanha	Kanni		
2016	Family Katta	Tanvi Sabnis		
2019	Adham	Nandini		
2020	The Disciple	Journalist		
2021	Godavari	Gautami Deshmukh		
2023	The Broken Table	Daughter-in-law	Hindi short film	
2023	Tarri	Sonal		
2023	Django JD	Harshita		
2025	Gaav Bolavato	Manasi		
2025	Vadapav	Gauri		
2026	Paach Futacha Bachchan	Vijaya		

=== Television ===
Year	Title	Role	Channel	Notes	Ref.
2008	Avaghachi Sansar	Antara Raghunath Mohite	Zee Marathi		
2010–2014	Swapnanchya Palikadle	Vaidehi Patkar / Pawani Rajadhyaksha	Star Pravah		
2018	Gulmohar		Zee Yuva	Episodic role	
2018	Sur Rahu De	Arohi	Zee Yuva		

=== Web shows ===
Year	Title	Role	Network	Notes	Ref.
2022	9 TO 5	Nalini	YouTube	Season 2	
2025	Raakh		Ultra Jhakaas		

=== Theatre ===
- Absolute
- Don Fulya Teen Badam

== Accolades ==
Year	Award	Category	Work	Result	Ref.
2017	Zee Natya Gaurav Puraskar	Best Actress	Absolute	Nominated	
2023	MaTa Sanman	Best Supporting Actress	Godavari	Nominated	
2023	Zee Chitra Gaurav Puraskar	Best Supporting Actress	Godavari	Won	
2023	Navrashtra Film & OTT Awards	Best Actress Jury Choice	Godavari	Won	
2024	Maharashtracha Favourite Kon?	Favourite Actress Critics	Godavari	Nominated	
