= Khupte Tithe Gupte =

Marathi language talk show

- Genre: Chat show
- Written by: Avinash Jagtap
- Starring: Avadhoot Gupte
- Country of origin: India
- Original language: Marathi
- No. of episodes: 110

Production
- Camera setup: Multi-camera
- Running time: 45 minutes
- Production company: Ekvira Production

Original release
- Network: Zee Marathi
- Release: 26 November 2010 – 17 September 2023

Khupte Tithe Gupte is an Indian Marathi language television chat show which aired on Zee Marathi. The show is hosted by Avadhoot Gupte.

== Concept ==
The show offers a platform for famous celebrities to express their point of view on the things which they could not do, because of some inevitable reasons. It will also showcase an informal chat with these celebrities about their journey of life and their achievements.

== Season summary ==
Season	Episodes	Originally Broadcast		Days
Season	Episodes	First aired	Last aired	Days
1	62	26 November 2010	25 June 2011	Fri-Sat
2	32	7 November 2012	21 February 2013	Wed-Thu
3	16	4 June 2023	17 September 2023	Sun

== Season 1 ==
- Atul Kulkarni
- Prakash Amte

== Season 2 ==
Episode No.	Guest	Aired date	Ref.
1	Narayan Rane and Neelam Rane	7 November 2012	
2	Vaibhav Mangle and Bhalchandra Kadam	8 November 2012	
3	Aadesh Bandekar and Suchitra Bandekar	14 November 2012	
4	Shounak Abhisheki and Nandesh Umap	15 November 2012	
5	Umesh Kulkarni and Girish Kulkarni	21 November 2012	
6	Amruta Khanvilkar and Urmila Dhangar	22 November 2012	
7	Sumeet Raghavan and Chinmayi Sumeet	28 November 2012	
8	Padmanabh Gaikwad and Ketaki Mategaonkar	29 November 2012	
9	Rakhi Sawant and Sunil Pal	5 December 2012	
10	Spruha Joshi and Vikram Gaikwad	6 December 2012	
11	Varsha Usgaonkar and Rohini Hattangadi	12 December 2012	
12	Kavita Lad and Prashant Damle	13 December 2012	
13	Sai Tamhankar and Alka Kubal	19 December 2012	
14	Vaishali Samant and Ashok Hande	20 December 2012	
15	Prasad Oak and Chinmay Mandlekar	26 December 2012	
16	Shobha Khote and Viju Khote	27 December 2012	
17	Pushkar Shrotri and Anand Ingale	2 January 2013	
18	Gauri Shinde and Abhinay Deo	3 January 2013	
19	Salil Kulkarni and Sandeep Khare	9 January 2013	
20	Avinash Narkar and Aishwarya Narkar	10 January 2013	
21	Vishakha Subhedar and Supriya Pathare	16 January 2013	
22	Siddhartha Jadhav and Trupti Jadhav	17 January 2013	
23	Atul Kulkarni and Geetanjali Kulkarni	23 January 2013	
24	Sonalee Kulkarni and Ravi Jadhav	24 January 2013	
25	Bhargavi Chirmule and Bela Shende	30 January 2013	
26	Nilesh Moharir and Abhijeet Khandkekar	31 January 2013	
27	Ajinkya Deo and Ashwini Bhave	6 February 2013	
28	Girija Oak and Nikhil Ratnaparkhi	7 February 2013	
29	Priya Marathe and Sharmishtha Raut	13 February 2013	
30	Priya Bapat and Umesh Kamat	14 February 2013	
31	Mohan Joshi and Savita Malpekar	20 February 2013	
32	Mahesh Manjrekar and Medha Manjrekar	21 February 2013	

== Season 3 ==
Episode No.	Guest	Aired date	Notes	Ref.
*	Eknath Shinde	—N/a	In promos	
1	Raj Thackeray	4 June 2023	2 Hours Episode	
2	Shreyas Talpade	11 June 2023		
3	Narayan Rane	18 June 2023		
4	Sanjay Raut	25 June 2023		
5	Urmila Matondkar	2 July 2023		
6	Nitin Gadkari	9 July 2023		
7	Devendra Fadnavis	16 July 2023		
8	Amol Kolhe	23 July 2023		
9	Sai Tamhankar	30 July 2023		
10	Sameer Wankhede	6 August 2023		
11	Vandana Gupte	13 August 2023		
12	Subodh Bhave	20 August 2023		
13	Jitendra Joshi	27 August 2023	10 pm	
14	Amruta Khanvilkar	3 September 2023		
15	Abhijit Bichukale	10 September 2023		
16	Supriya Sule	17 September 2023		
