= Vadapav (film) =

2026 Indian Marathi-language romantic comedy film

- Directed by: Prasad Oak
- Written by: Siddharth Salvi
- Produced by: Amit Basnet; Prajay Kamat; Swati Khopkar; Ninad Battin
- Starring: Prasad Oak; Gauri Nalawade; Savita Prabhune; Abhinay Berde; Ritika Shrotri
- Cinematography: Sanjay Memane
- Edited by: Mayur Hardas
- Music by: Kunal-Karan
- Production companies: AB International Films; MergeXR Studios; Victor Movies Ltd.; AVK Entertainment
- Distributed by: Cinepolis India
- Release date: 2 October 2025
- Running time: 108 minutes
- Country: India
- Language: Marathi

Vadapav is a 2025 Indian Marathi-language romantic comedy drama film directed by Prasad Oak and written by Siddharth Salvi. Produced by AB International Films, MergeXR Studios, Victor Movies Ltd. and AVK Entertainment, the film stars Oak, Gauri Nalawade, Abhinay Berde, Ritika Shrotri Savita Prabhune.

It was released theatrically on 2 October 2025. The film is notable as Oak's 100th film as an actor.

== Plot ==
Set against the backdrop of a thriving Vadapav restaurant business run by the Deshmukh family in London, the story follows Jaydev Deshmukh, a widower and single father. Jaydev falls in love with Gauri, a woman considerably younger than him, and the two decide to marry. To manage his family's likely objections to the wide age difference, they concoct an elaborate story. Complications arise when it emerges that Jaydev's adult son, Arjun, is in love with Gauri's younger sister, Kavya, meaning Arjun wishes to marry the younger sister of his prospective stepmother.

== Cast ==
- Prasad Oak as Jaydev Deshmukh
- Gauri Nalawade as Gauri
- Abhinay Berde as Arjun Deshmukh
- Ritika Shrotri as Kavya
- Savita Prabhune as Subhadra, Jaydev's mother
- Rasika Vengurlekar as Anjali, Jaydev's sister
- Siddharth Salvi as Vikas, Anjali's husband
- Sameer Shirwadkar as Akash, Jaydev's brother
- Ashwini Kinhikar as Madhura, Jaydev's sister-in-law
- Shalva Kinjawadekar as Angad, Jaydev's nephew
- Mahesh Patwardhan as the father of Gauri and Kavya

== Production ==
Principal photography began in mid-June 2023 and wrapped in early August 2023. Much of the story is set in London, with the narrative centred on the Deshmukh family's vada pav franchise.

== Music ==
The film's songs were composed by the duo Kunal–Karan and the background score was composed by Sai–Piyush.

Tracklisting
No.	Title	Lyrics	Singer(s)	Length
1.	"Vadapav Title Track"	Kunal-Karan	Nakash Aziz	2:50
2.	"Haravalya Vata"	Mandar Cholkar	Sonu Nigam	3:14
3.	"Julalya Vata"	Kunal-Karan	Harshavardhan Wavare	3:35
4.	"Navribai"	Kunal-Karan	Juilee Joglekar, Rohit Raut	2:37
Total length:				12:16

== Release and reception ==
Vadapav was released theatrically on 2 October 2025, coinciding with Dussehra. The trailer was launched on 22 September 2025 at an event attended by actor Ritesh Deshmukh, who praised the film and congratulated Oak on completing 100 films.

Reviewing the film for Movie Talkies, the critic rated it 2 out of 5 and called it a "missed opportunity", praising its taboo subject but faulting the rushed climax and unconvincing character shifts. Anub George of The Times of India rated the film 2.5 out of 5, praising Oak's performance and the film's costume and set design but faulting the "hammy acting and illogical writing". Film Information called the story unusual but felt it rested on too many coincidences, concluding that the film was "too ordinary to satiate the hunger of the discerning audience". Anupama Gunde of Pudhari rated the film 4 out of 5, calling it "an attempt to strengthen the bonds of relationships" and finding it interesting to watch how a close-knit family resolves its complications.
