= GauriShankar =

2025 Indian Marathi-language film by Harekrishna Gowda

- Theatrical release poster
- Directed by: Harekrishna Gowda
- Produced by: Vishal Pradeep Sampat
- Starring: Harekrishna Gowda; Rahul Jagtap; Dakshina Rathod
- Cinematography: Roshan Khadgi
- Edited by: Amit Javalkar
- Music by: Prashant-Nishant
- Production companies: MovieRoot Productions; Orange Productions
- Release date: 28 February 2025
- Country: India
- Language: Marathi

GauriShankar is a 2025 Indian Marathi-language action drama film directed by Harekrishna Gowda and produced by MovieRoot Productions and Orange Productions. It stars Harekrishna Gowda, Dakshina Rathod, and Rahul Jagtap in pivotal roles, marking their debut. The story revolves around the love between Gauri and Shankar and the challenges they face in their relationship.

The film was released on 28 February 2025.

== Cast ==
- Harekrishna Gowda
- Kavya Suryavanshi Vasani
- Dakshina Rathod
- Rahul Jagtap
- Sushil Bhosale
- Aarya Jaywant Patil

== Soundtrack ==
The music for the film is composed by Prashant-Nishant.

Track listing
No.	Title	Lyrics	Singer(s)	Length
1.	"Sukh Aale"	Sanket Kolambekar	Kunal Ganjawala; Aanandi Joshi	5:05
2.	"Basti"	Sanket Kolambekar	Rohit Raut	4:24
Total length:				9:29

== Release ==
The teaser of the film was released on 8 February 2025, and the 1-minute 20-second trailer was released on 14 February 2025.
