= Gaav Bolavato =

2025 Indian Marathi-language film

- Directed by: Vinod Manikrao
- Written by: Sachin Vitthal Patil
- Produced by: Prashant Narode; Shantanu Bhake
- Starring: Bhushan Pradhan; Gauri Nalawade; Madhav Abhyankar; Shrikant Yadav; Kiran Sharad
- Cinematography: Shakeel B. Khan
- Edited by: Gaurav Meshram
- Music by: Nishad Golambare; Prakash Prabhakar
- Production companies: Sanskar Wahini Productions; Filmitarian Mediaworks LLP
- Distributed by: August Entertainment
- Release date: 21 March 2025
- Running time: 125 minutes
- Country: India
- Language: Marathi

Gaav Bolavato (transl. The Village Calls) is a 2025 Indian Marathi language drama film directed by Vinod Manikrao. The film addresses the critical issue of rural-urban migration and its impact on village development in contemporary Maharashtra. Starring Bhushan Pradhan, Gauri Nalawade, Madhav Abhyankar and Shrikant Yadav in lead roles, the film explores the story of a young man who returns to his village to fulfill his deceased father's dream of transforming it into a model village.

== Plot ==
Sangram Joshi is an educated young man who completes his studies in his native village before moving to Mumbai in search of better career prospects. Meanwhile, his elderly parents, Appasaheb and his mother, continue to live in their ancestral home, patiently awaiting their son's return. The village, however, suffers under the corrupt rule of Sarpanch Sarjerao, who, along with a shrewd businessman named Makhija, terrorizes the locals. The duo coerces farmers into selling their land for the construction of a chemical factory, prioritizing their own greed over the welfare of the villagers. Sarjerao's corruption runs deep—he even orchestrates the killings of those who oppose him, disguising the murders as farmer suicides to escape legal scrutiny. Back home, Sangram's parents wish to see him married to Jhipri, a village girl who has loved him since childhood. However, Sangram's heart belongs to Manasi, a woman he met in Mumbai, creating a clash between his modern outlook and his family's traditional expectations.

Sangram's life takes a tragic turn when he learns of his father's sudden death, prompting him to return to the village to perform the final rites. There, he discovers a poignant letter left behind by Appasaheb, expressing his dream of transforming the village into a clean, progressive, and model community that could serve as an inspiration for rural development across Maharashtra. He entrusts this vision to Sangram, urging him to fulfill it. As Sangram delves deeper into the circumstances surrounding his father's death, he uncovers the horrifying truth, it was not a natural demise but a murder orchestrated by the corrupt Sarpanch Sarjerao, who viewed Appasaheb as an obstacle to his illicit operations. Driven by grief and his father's unfulfilled dream, Sangram resolves to stay in the village and wage a determined fight against corruption. He exposes Sarjerao's crimes and contests the Sarpanch elections, rallying the villagers who have long suffered under tyranny. Through honesty, resilience, and collective effort, Sangram triumphs over Sarjerao and becomes the new Sarpanch. His victory not only restores justice but also symbolizes the return of educated youth to rural India, dedicated to fostering integrity, progress, and sustainable development in their communities.

== Cast ==
- Bhushan Pradhan as Sangram Joshi
- Gauri Nalawade as Manasi
- Madhav Abhyankar as Appasaheb
- Shrikant Yadav as Sarjerao
- Kiran Sharad as Jhipri
- Shubhangi Latkar as Sangram's mother
- Anil Gavas as Jhipri's father
- Pravin Indu as Datta
- Praful Joshi
- Rajesh Bhosle as Sudhakar
- Jagdish Chavan as Satish
- Sachin Patil as Vinay
- Pooja Malekar
- Anjali Jogalekar
- Arvind Parab

== Soundtrack ==
Track listing
| No. | Title | Lyrics | Music | Singer(s) | Length |
|---|---|---|---|---|---|
| 1. | "Gaav Bolavato" | Vaibhav Joshi | Nishad Golambare | Manish Rajgire | 2:14 |
| 2. | "Saada Sopaa" | Vaibhav Joshi | Nishad Golambare | Avadhoot Gupte | 2:33 |
| 3. | "Tujhich Hi Maati" | Prakash Prabhakar | Prakash Prabhakar | Prakash Prabhakar | 3:51 |
| 4. | "Tu Chal Pudha" | Vaibhav Joshi, Mandar Cholkar | Nishad Golambare | Vivek Hariharan | 2:59 |
| Total length: | | | | | 11:37 |

== Release ==
The teaser of the film was unveiled on 13 February 2025, featuring a tagline that highlighted the enduring emotional bond between villages and their people despite changing times. The official trailer followed on 6 March 2025, and the film was released on 21 March 2025. Upon its release, the film received negative reviews. Film Information described it as "predictable," noting "the drama is based on a true story, it appears oft-repeated. There aren’t many scenes of relief in the tension-ridden drama." Maharashtra Times critic Kalpeshraj Kubal rated the film 2.5 stars, calling it "not effective enough." He further remarked that "Due to the shortcomings of a simple plot, a superficial screenplay and a superficial setting, the 'call' of the film is not heard as strongly as it should be."
