= Family Katta =

- Directed by: Chandrakant Kulkarni
- Screenplay by: Prashant Dalvi
- Story by: Prashant Dalvi
- Produced by: Vandana Gupte
- Starring: Dilip Prabhavalkar; Vandana Gupte; Alok Rajwade; Gauri Nalawade; Kiran Karmarkar; Prateeksha Lonkar; Sachin Deshpande; Sulekha Talwalkar; Sanjay Khapre; Sai Tamhankar; Aadesh Shrivastava
- Cinematography: Mahesh Limaye
- Edited by: Jayant Jathar
- Music by: Mangesh Dhakade
- Production company: Sister Concern Entertainment
- Release date: 7 October 2016
- Running time: 124 minutes
- Country: India
- Language: Marathi

Family Katta is a 2016 Indian Marathi-language comedy drama film directed by Chandrakant Kulkarni and produced by Vandana Gupte under the production banner of Sister Concern Entertainment. The film was released on 7 October 2016 and stars an ensemble cast of Dilip Prabhavalkar, Vandana Gupte, Alok Rajwade, Gauri Nalawade, Kiran Karmarkar, Prateeksha Lonkar, Sachin Deshpande, Sulekha Talwalkar, Sanjay Khapre, Sai Tamhankar and Aadesh Shrivastava.

== Plot ==
Family Katta is a story of a dysfunctional family and the way in which the elderly couple at the head of the Sabnis family tries to hold it together. Madhukar (Dilip Prabhavalkar), who is also known as Bhai, and Malti (Vandana Gupte) are the elderly couple based in Pune, who are celebrating their 50th marriage anniversary and have planned to organize a small party at their residence. This is their another effort at reuniting their four children and their extended families. Their children and grandchildren are located in different cities, and the family has lost contact over time due to many unresolved issues from the past, although the grandchildren (the two young cousins) are still close. Their daughter, Manju (Sai Tamhankar), is married to a man from a different community who is older to her (referred as of her father's age in one scene), and will be coming home and meeting the family after six years. It is also meant to be an opportunity for the patriarch Bhai to forgive their daughter.

The couple is shown carrying away daily household chores while anticipating and getting things ready for the big day. There is also a light humour arising out of couple’s arguments over small issues in their day-to-day life. The couple is shown celebrating their anniversary by sharing a private moment and remembering all the memories of their past years in the early morning hours. Meanwhile, the grandchildren create a family WhatsApp group and plan to go to their grandparents' house together against their parents' wishes. However, the film takes an extremely drastic turn in the second half since things do not go as planned and Malti's dream of seeing the family happy together is tested to the limit.

== Cast ==
- Dilip Prabhavalkar as Madhukar Sabnis (Bhai)
- Vandana Gupte as Malti Sabnis
- Alok Rajwade as Siddharth Sabnis (Grandson)
- Gauri Nalawade as Tanvi Sabnis (Granddaughter)
- Kiran Karmarkar as Nishikant Sabnis (Older son)
- Prateeksha Lonkar as Sujata Sabnis (Older daughter-in-law)
- Sachin Deshpande as Deepak Sabnis (Middle son)
- Sulekha Talwalkar as Veena Sabnis (Middle daughter-in-law)
- Sanjay Khapre as Viju Sabnis (Younger son)
- Sai Tamhankar as Manju Sabnis (Daughter)
- Aadesh Shrivastava as Akhilesh Srivastava (Son-in-law)
- Bharati Achrekar as Malti's sister (Special Appearance)
- Kishore Pradhan as Bhai's brother (Special Appearance)

== Soundtrack ==
"Ek Sohlaa Nirala"

Single by Aanandi Joshi

from the album Family Katta
- Language: Marathi
- Released: 10 October 2016
- Length: 3:41
- Label: Sister Concern Entertainment
- Composer: Mangesh Dhakade
- Lyricist: Dasoo

The soundtrack of Family Katta consists of just one song, Ek Sohlaa Nirala, which was sung by Aanandi Joshi, composed by Mangesh Dhakade and written by Dasoo.

== Reception ==
The Times of India rated the film at three and a half stars, stating that "In an industry that is busy following trends most of the times, Family Katta comes as a fresh detour from the usual fare." Loksatta also reviewed the movie, as did the Pune Mirror, which stated that it had a "strong emotional core". The movie received three and half stars by ABP Majha stating this is a Celebration that puts Xrays on Relationships.

== Accolades ==
| Year | Award | Category | Recipient | Result |
|---|---|---|---|---|
| 2017 | Jio Filmfare Awards Marathi | Best Film | Family Katta | Nominated |
| 2017 | Jio Filmfare Awards Marathi | Best Director | Chandrakant Kulkarni | Nominated |
| 2017 | Jio Filmfare Awards Marathi | Best Actress | Vandana Gupte | Nominated |
| 2017 | Jio Filmfare Awards Marathi | Best Actress Critics | Vandana Gupte | Won |
| 2017 | Jio Filmfare Awards Marathi | Best Supporting Actress | Sai Tamhankar | Won |
| 2017 | Maharashtracha Favourite Kon? | Favourite Supporting Actress | Sai Tamhankar | Nominated |
