= Madhurey =

- Theatrical release poster
- Directed by: R. Madhesh
- Screenplay by: Ramana Madhesh
- Dialogues by: Bharathan
- Story by: R. Madhesh
- Produced by: R. Madhesh
- Starring: Vijay; Sonia Agarwal; Rakshita
- Cinematography: S. Saravanan
- Edited by: Anthony
- Music by: Vidyasagar
- Production company: Movie Magic
- Distributed by: Kalasangham Films; Ayngaran International
- Release date: 12 August 2004
- Running time: 146 minutes
- Country: India
- Language: Tamil

Madhurey is a 2004 Indian Tamil-language masala film produced, directed and co-written by Ramana Madhesh (in his directorial debut). It stars Vijay in the main lead role alongside Sonia Agarwal and Rakshita, while Vadivelu, Pasupathy, Seetha, and Tejashree play supporting roles. The music was composed by Vidyasagar with cinematography by S. Saravanan and editing by Anthony. The film was released on Independence Day Weenkend 12 August 2004. The film ran for 150 days and was declared a box office hit.

== Plot ==
Madhuravel works as a vegetable vendor with his friend Pandu. He is a do-gooder and protector of the family of Kamatchi and her two daughters. Madurey eradicates loan sharks and fights "bad guys" in the market. Meanwhile, Anitha has a liking for Madurey and manages to win him over from Maheshwari. One day, while Madhurey is fighting some goons, a goon throws a briefcase, which falls. When the briefcase opens, Kamakshi finds a newspaper with photos of Madurey and her daughter, Susheela, in it. She then shoots Madurey, and he is hospitalised. At the hospital, when Kamakshi questions Pandu about Madhurey, he reveals who Madhurey really is.

The story shifts to a flashback, where Madurey is the district collector of Madurai, with Susheela and Pandu as his assistants. He is the action-packed bureaucrat who takes to the streets to solve the citizens' problems. He does the job of policing and is up against criminals. He does not believe in the IPS and the police force to clean up the city. One such clean-up operation takes him to KTR, a don who is running a parallel law enforcement system with his own court. He doles out justice to all and is God to the ordinary. Madurey does not take lightly to this parallel outfit. A clash takes place, and Susheela is killed in a fight between Madurey and KTR. KTR blames Madurey.

Now, Madurey goes undercover as a vegetable vendor because he aims to pin down KTR. From now on, Madurey is on a rampage until KTR is finished and the murder charge is removed.

== Cast ==
- Vijay as Madhuravel IAS (Madhurey)
- Sonia Agarwal as Susheela
- Rakshita as Anitha
- Tejashree as Maheshwari
- Vadivelu as Pandu
- Seetha as Kamakshi, Susheela's mother
- Pasupathy as KTR
- Hemalatha as Susheela's sister
- Manicka Vinayagam as Madurey's father
- Ilavarasu as Ilango, Anitha's father
- Shanmugarajan as Commissioner
- Yugendran as Jeevan
- Vennira Aadai Moorthy as Anitha's house owner
- Karate Raja as Kumarasamy, KTR's henchmen
- A. V. Ramanan as Officer Karthikeyan
- Bala Singh as Gopal
- Raj Kapoor as Kanthuvatti
- Nellai Siva as KTR's supporter
- Bonda Mani as Waiter
- Vijay Ganesh
- Sridhar as himself in the song "Machan Peru Madhurey"

== Production ==
R. Madhesh, an assistant of director S. Shankar, was initially assigned to direct Jai with Prashanth, However, after filming a song featuring Prashanth and lead actress Simran, he left the project and began work on another film Madhurey, which became his directorial debut. In addition to directing, Madhesh also produced the film. For the character of vegetable seller, Vijay prepared himself by observing real vegetable sellers from Koyambedu.

The set resembling vegetable market designed by Rajeevan was erected on a five-acre land opposite Ponniyamman Kovil, at Saligramam, Chennai. The set which cost around ₹16 crore consisting of a garden, marketplace, fish-market, flower shop, lorry stand, cinema theatre, temple, church, railway line, housing colony and slum, most of the film's shooting was done on that set. The song "Kanden Kanden" was shot at France and Italy especially at lavender gardens while the song "Ice Katti" was shot in a glass dome set with "tinted glass and special paints sprayed on glass from abroad".

== Music ==
The soundtrack was composed by Vidyasagar.

Song title	Singers	Lyrics
"Kandaen Kandaen"	Sadhana Sargam, Madhu Balakrishnan	Yugabharathi
"Bambara Kannu"	Udit Narayan, Srilekha Parthasarathy	Yugabharathi
"Elantha Pazham"	Tippu, Anuradha Sriram	Pa. Vijay
"Ice Katti Ice Katti"	Karthik, Sayanora Philip	Pa. Vijay
"Machan Peru Madhurey"	Shankar Mahadevan	Kabilan

One song " Varanda Varanda", sung by Pushpavanam Kuppusamy, is included only in the screen and not in the audio disc separately.

== Release ==
The film was cleared by the Central Board of Film Certification in late August. Madhesh reportedly sold the film to distributors for the price of ₹1.25 crore (equivalent to ₹4.8 crore or US$500,000 in 2026) despite Vijay warning him not to sell at such a high rate. Despite this, the film was a box office hit and ran for 150 days.

== Reception ==
Ananda Vikatan rated the film 39 out of 100. Malathi Rangarajan of The Hindu wrote that "It isn't just a question of pace — cohesiveness is what is missing in "Madhura". Malini Mannath of Chennai Online noted that "Producing, scripting and directing it, he seems to have concentrated more on the glamour and the frills, alternating action with dance numbers, and missing out on a coherent script". Sify wrote, "After that racy entertainer, Ghilli, everyone anticipated Vijay's next release to be a cracker of a movie, Alas, it turns out to be another assembly-line product, particularly post-interval. Still Vijay makes the film happening with his macho heroism, savvy one-liners and knockout performance. Clearly he is at home, playing this larger-than life character". Visual Dasan of Kalki called it a "chocolate pill" for Vijay's fans. G. Ulaganathan of Deccan Herald called it "a typical Vijay film with all the ingredients that would satisfy his fans".
