= Sandakari =

- Theatrical release poster
- Directed by: R. Madhesh
- Screenplay by: R. Madhesh
- Based on: My Boss by Jeethu Joseph
- Produced by: Jeyabalan Jeyakumar; Sharmiela Mandre
- Starring: Vimal; Shriya Saran
- Cinematography: R. B. Gurudev
- Edited by: Dinesh Ponraj
- Music by: Amresh Ganesh
- Production company: Boss Production Corporation
- Release date: 18 September 2026
- Running time: 141 minutes
- Country: India
- Language: Tamil

Sandakari (transl. Fighter woman) is a 2026 Indian Tamil-language romantic comedy film written and directed by R. Madhesh. It is a remake of the 2012 film Malayalam film My Boss, which itself is based on the American film The Proposal (2009). The film stars Vimal and Shriya Saran as a London-based Indian secretary and executive who fake being engaged as part of the executive's plot to avoid deportation when her work permit expires.

Sandakari was shot in 2019 but remained unreleased for over six years. In early 2026, it won three Tamil Nadu State Film Awards, including Best Film (Third Prize). The film had its theatrical release on 18 September the same year.

== Plot ==
Maya (Shriya Saran), an overbearing London executive, needs her assistant Vetri (Vimal) to pose as her fiancé. It is a workable arrangement for a comedy: both need the lie to survive, and neither particularly enjoys the other’s company.

== Cast ==
- Vimal as Vetri Konda
- Shriya Saran as Maya Azhagan
- Prabhu as Vetri's father
- Punnagai Poo Gheetha as Maya Azhagan's friend
- Sathyan as Kunjumani
- K. R. Vijaya as Vetri's grandmother
- Rekha as Maya Azhagan's mother
- Dev Gill as Matthew
- Uma Padmanabhan as Janaki; Vetri's mother
- Crane Manohar as Bovo
- Mahanadi Shankar as Villager
- Vadivel Balaji as an Auto driver

== Production ==
The film was initially titled Sandakari, My Boss. The first schedule of the film was shot in New York, Venice, and London. The second schedule took place in Goa. The film was being shot in Kerala as of 13 July 2019. A house-like set was erected on an island-like location 20 kilometres (20,000 m) away from Kochi where filming took place for fifteen days from the end of July 2019. By December, the makers had returned to London to film scenes. While filming at the Stansted Airport, Saran was interrogated by local authorities for entering a restricted area without documents until Vimal submitted the documents as proof, allowing production to continue.

== Soundtrack ==
The music was composed by Amresh Ganesh, and the lyrics were written by Kabilan and Vivek. The soundtrack features three songs.

Track listing
No.	Title	Singer(s)	Length
1.	"Natali"	Vicky, Sarath Santosh
2.	"Thakali"	Roshini
3.	"Bit song"	Amresh Ganesh

== Release ==
Sandakari was cleared by the censor board in February 2020, but remained unreleased for six years. In early 2026, the Government of Tamil Nadu announced the Tamil Nadu State Film Awards for films released between 2016 and 2022. Sandakari won in three categories in the 2020 batch: Best Film (Third Prize), Best Male Playback Singer (Amresh Ganesh), and Best Art Director (Ayyappan). This led to netizens questioning under what criteria the film qualified since it had yet to receive a theatrical release. The film eventually released on 18 September the same year.

== Reception ==
News Today wrote, "While the story relies on familiar commercial elements, the London-Tamil Nadu setting and the marriage-of-convenience premise give it enough flavour to keep the proceedings engaging". Akshay Kumar of Cinema Express wrote, "The sloppy manner in stringing together the already regular ideas with poor jokes, ill-conceived scenes and performances hamstrung by writing makes Sandakkari a forgettable fare". Abhinav Subramanian of The Times of India wrote, "[Vimal] and Shriya Saran are decent in the lead roles and share some chemistry. The contrast between the London and village settings also gives the film some welcome visual variety".

Anupama Subramanian of Deccan Chronicle wrote, "While the premise sets up a promising dynamic of a boss dependent on her subordinate, weak writing prevents their evolving relationship from feeling earned. The transition from corporate London to rural Tamil Nadu triggers abrupt character shifts, leaving the core romance lacking warmth and credibility". Ganesh A of Asianet News criticised the weak screenplay and felt the character changes after the interval were unnatural. He felt the weak antagonist, the old-fashioned comedy and suggestive dialogues too were minuses. Maalai Malar appreciated Vimal and Saran's performances but felt the characters were not properly developed. Virakesari too appreciated the cast performances, cinematography and background score but felt the story was outdated and derivative.
