= Rohit Raut =

Indian playback singer

Rohit Shyam Raut
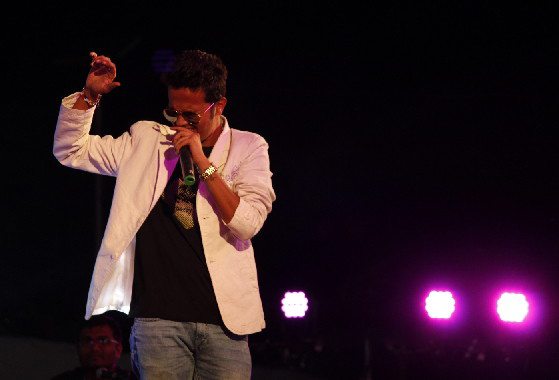
- Raut at live concert
- Born: 18 November 1995 (age 30); Latur, Maharashtra, India
- Occupations: Singer; composer
- Years active: 2013–present
- Known for: Sa Re Ga Ma Pa Marathi Li'l Champs; Indian Idol 11; I-PopStar winner
- Spouse: Juilee Jogalekar (m. 2022)
- Musical career
- Genres: Indian pop playback singing
- Instrument: Vocals

Rohit Shyam Raut (born 18 November 1995) is an Indian singer and music director, who primarily works in the Marathi film industry. He appeared in the Indian singing reality show Indian Idol and was the runner-up of its eleventh season.

== Personal life ==
Rohit Shyam Raut was born on 18 November 1995 in Latur. He completed his secondary education at Shri Deshikendra School. Raut lives with his father Shyam Raut, who works as the cultural head of the Nationalist Congress Party, Latur District, and younger brother Yugal Raut, who owns a sales business. In 2022, Raut married his longtime girlfriend Juilee Joglekar, who is also a singer.

== Career ==
Earlier in his life, Raut started participating in district, state, and national level music competitions. He was selected at Sa Re Ga Ma Pa Marathi Li'l Champs on Zee Marathi and started to gain popularity from the show. He was one of the finalists of the show and was known as "Future Music Director". He made his debut from the song Yaara Yaara in Duniyadari. After that, he appeared in many Marathi films including Triple Seat, Muramba, and Ti Saddhya Kay Karte.

The 2019 film Mogra Phulaalaa, marked Raut's debut as a music director. He has won couple of awards at the Mirchi Music Awards Marathi and was nominated for the best playback singer at the Filmfare Marathi Awards 2020 for the song Manmohini.

He sang most of the title tracks and songs of TV shows like Ka Re Durava, Sang Tu Aahes Ka?, Majha Hoshil Na, Yeu Kashi Tashi Me Nandayla, Pasant Aahe Mulgi, Dil Dosti Duniyadari, etc. Raut participated and became popular from his appearance on the eleventh season of Indian Idol, where he was the runner-up of the show.

== Discography ==
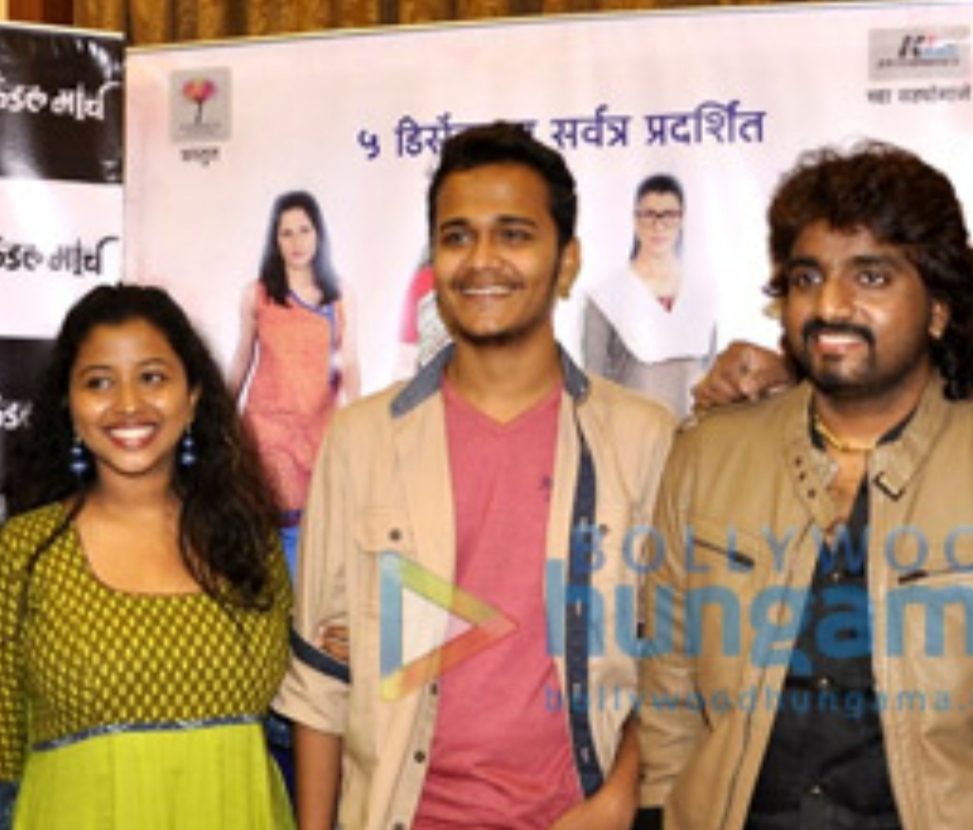
Rohit (in middle)

Year	Film	Song	Composer
2013	Duniyadari	"Yaara Yaara"	Pankaj Padghan
2014	Candle March	"Sehar"	Amitraj
2014	Raakhandaar	"Angai"	Kanakraj
2014	Surajya	"Ha Nava Bahana"	Pankaj Padghan
2014	Pyaar Vali Love Story	"Shutter Ka Tala"	Pankaj Padghan
2015	Prime Time	"Reshmi"	Niranjan Pedgaonkar
2015	Coffee Ani Barach Kahi	"Coffee Ani Barach Kahi"	Aditya Bedekar
2015	Kay Rao Tumhi	"Sod Na Ga Rag Ha"	Sameer Fatarpekar
2015	Shutter	"Jantar Mantar"	Ousepphachan
2015	Shinma	"Asa Kasa"	Varun Likhate
2015	Dabba Ais Paise	"Kaawlaancha Shalet Adda"	Shrihari Vaze
2015	Vajlach Pahije	"Tuch Tu"	Praful Karlekar
2016	Phuntroo	"Ka Watate"	Jasraj-Saurabh-Rishikesh
2016	One Way Ticket	"Befikar"	Gaurav Dagaonkar
2016	Bernie	"Bernie"	Amitraj
2016	Mr. and Mrs. Sadachari	"Mr. & Mrs. Sadachari"	Pankaj Padghan
2016	Vazandar	"Golu Polu"	Avinash–Vishwajeet
2016	Kanha	"Chadh Mitra"	Avadhoot Gupte
2017	Happy Birthday	"Tu Yetana Samori"	Vikrant Warde
2017	Undga	"Mann Zimmad Zhala Ji"	Vikrant Warde
2017	Bus Stop	"Move On"	Jasraj-Saurabh-Rishikesh
2017	Conditions Apply- Ati Lagu	"Kahi Kalena"	Avinash–Vishwajeet
2017	TTMM-Tujha Tu Majha Me	"Kshan Mohare"	Pankaj Padghan
2017	Muramba	"Aga Aik Na"	Jasraj-Saurabh-Rishikesh
2017	Gaon Thor Pudhari Chor	"Name Dharun Mara Shikka"	Nandu Honap
2017	Hrudayantar	"Datlele Dhuke"	Praful Karlekar
2017	Ti Saddhya Kay Karte	"Hrudayat Vaje Something"	Avinash–Vishwajeet
2018	Gat-Mat	"Bindasss Tu"	Sameer Saptiskar
2018	Boyz 2	"Goti Soda Batli Foda"	Avadhoot Gupte
2018	Unch Bharari	"Sona Samjun Ghe Roop"	Nandu Honap
2018	Vantas	"Tipur Tipur"	Pankaj Padghan
2018	Raja	"Raja"	Pankaj Padghan
2018	Mantr	"Zhing Thing"	Avinash–Vishwajeet
2018	Ashi Hi Amchi College Journey	"College Journey- Title Track"	Sai-Piyush
2018	Barayan	"Charger"	Pankaj Padghan
2018	Looose Control	"Bharaari"	Rohit Nagbhide
2018	Kay Zala Kalana	"Kay Zala Kalana - Title Track"	Pankaj Padghan
2018	Odh	"Na Jane Kya Hua Hai"	Pravin Kuwar
2019	Triple Seat	"Naate He Konte"	Avinash–Vishwajeet
2019	Baala	"Duniyadaari"	Mahesh-Rakesh
2019	H2O	"Dil Dosticha Vaada"	Nikhil Vispute
2019	Mogra Phulaalaa	"Manmohini"	Kaushik Deshpande
2019	Amhi Befikar	"Haravale"	Kunal-Karan
2019	Ek Hota Pani	"Bhan Rahil"	Vikas Joshi
2019	Ti and Ti	"Silly Silly"	Sai-Piyush
2019	Anandi Gopal	"Tu Ahes Na"	Jasraj-Saurabh-Rishikesh
2019	Rampaat	"Rampaat- title song"	Chinar-Mahesh
2021	OMG - Oh My Ghost	"Nave Nave Ishare"	Rohit Raut
2021	Befaam	"Porga Vaya Gelay"	Amitraj
2021	Hashtag Prem	"Thoda Thoda"	Pravin Kuwar
2021	Hashtag Prem	"Kahi Tari"	Pravin Kuwar
2022	Coffee	"Coffee Title Track"	Trupti Chavan
2022	Tamasha Live	"Gammat Gadya"	Pankaj Padghan
2023	Himesh Ke Dil Se	"Tu Mera Aitbaarr"	Himesh Reshammiya
2023	Bamboo	"Mi Tula Tya Najrene"	Sameer Saptiskar
2023	Gadad Andhar	"Dariya"	Rohit Raut
2023	Dhishkyaoon	"Dhishkyaoon"	Sanmit Waghmare & Shreyash Deshpande
2023	Aalay Mazya Rashila	"I Love You Baby"	Pravin Kuwar
2023	Tarri	"Kshan Halwa"	Praful-Swapnil
2023	Tarri	"Ye Na Tu Aata"	Praful-Swapnil
2023	School College Ani Life	"Sugandhi Hawa Rock Version"	Pankaj Padghan
2023	School College Ani Life	"Chandanzula"	Pankaj Padghan
2023	Aathvani	"Tu Jara Thamb Na"	Suhit Abhyankar
2023	London Misal	"Bhanda Fod"	Rohit Raut
2023	Pillu Bachelor	"Phulawani Phulawani"	Chinar-Mahesh
2024	Ole Aale	"Phulpakharu"	Sachin–Jigar
2025	ChikiChiki BooBoomBoom	"Mitra"	Rohan-Rohan
2025	GauriShankar	"Basti"	Prashant - Nishant
2025	Mumbai Local	"Radha Krishna"	Dev Aashish
2025	Premachi Goshta 2	"Ye Na Punha"	Avinash–Vishwajeet
