= Chocklet =

2001 Tamil film by A. Venkatesh

- Poster
- Directed by: A. Venkatesh
- Written by: Pattukkottai Prabakar (Dialogue)
- Screenplay by: A. Venkatesh
- Story by: R. Madhesh
- Produced by: R. Madhesh
- Starring: Prashanth; Jaya Re
- Cinematography: S. D. Vijay Milton
- Edited by: B. Lenin; V. T. Vijayan
- Music by: Deva
- Production company: Movie Magic Films
- Distributed by: Movie Magic Films; A. P International
- Release date: 7 September 2001
- Running time: 158 minutes
- Country: India
- Language: Tamil

Chocklet is a 2001 Indian Tamil-language romantic action film directed by A. Venkatesh with the story penned by and produced by R. Madhesh. Starring Prashanth and debutant Jaya Re in the lead roles, the film also has Livingston, Suhasini, Mumtaj (dual role) and Nagendra Prasad in supporting roles, while the score and soundtrack are composed by Deva.

Chocklet was released on 7 September 2001 and became a commercial success.

== Plot ==
Aravindan "Aravind" meets Anjali and falls in love at first sight without knowing her background. When they meet, Anjali tells Aravind she would like to go for a trial-romance for a week, which might lead to a long-term romance, with which he agrees. Anjali is the daughter of assistant Commissioner Jayachandran and Saradha. Aravind maintains a cordial acquaintance with both of them, not knowing Anjali is their daughter. Anjali acknowledges them as her parents. Jayachandran convinces Anjali to dispense with this trial romance and make a deeper commitment as he finds Aravind a gentleman. Aravind convinces Saradha to support him as her suitor, so Saradha makes Aravind marry Anjali.

== Cast ==
- Prashanth as Aravindan
- Jaya Re as Anjali
- Mumtaj in dual role as Nirmala (Nimmi) & 'Bangarapalli' Bhama
- Livingston as ACP Jayachandran, Anjali's father
- Suhasini as Saradha Jayachandran, Anjali's mother
- Nagendra Prasad as Guru, Aravind's friend
- Charle as Sasi, Aravind's friend
- Dhamu as Dhamu, Aravind's friend
- Master Udayaraj as Sasi's son
- Siva Narayana Murthy as Inspector Gopal
- Cool Suresh as College Rowdy
- Minnal Deepa as Anjali and Nirmala's friend

Uncredited

- Chaplin Balu as Babu, Aravind's friend
- Vennira Aadai Moorthy as College Principal
- Ajay Kapoor as Ganesh
- Muthalvan Saran as Iyer
- Boys Rajan as Mortuary Doctor

== Production ==
The film began production in January 2001 and scenes were shot at Mayajaal for three days later that month. At an official launch event held soon afterwards, producer R. Madhesh donated seventy five kilogrammes of chocolate to poor children, equivalent to the weight of the film's lead actor Prashanth. Reema Sen and Richa Pallod were considered to play the heroines, though their high remuneration meant that the makers signed on Avantika, a former Miss Goa pageant winner. For the film, Avantika was given the stagename of Jaya Re. A fight scene was shot at Koyambedu Market Road near Chennai with 16 cameras, while scenes were shot in Japan and a song was shot on a cruise ship between Cambodia and Vietnam.

== Music ==
The music for Chocklet was composed by Deva, with lyrics penned by Vaali. The soundtrack features a mix of romantic and energetic tracks, aligning with the film's youthful theme. The song "Malai Malai" became a popular anthem among audiences during the film's release. Producer R. Madhesh opted against a traditional audio cassette release function, choosing instead to distribute the cassettes to music shops enclosed with Cadbury chocolate.

No.	Song	Singer(s)	Lyricist
1	"Anjumani"	Mathangi	Vaali
2	"Dhuryodhana Dhuryodhana"	Shankar Mahadevan, Mahalakshmi Iyer	Vaali
3	"Hosima Hosima"	Devan Ekambaram, Anupama	Vaali
4	"Kappaleh Kappaleh"	Hariharan, Mahalakshmi Iyer	Vaali
5	"Kokaragiri"	Sabesh–Murali, Mathangi	Vaali
6	"Malai Malai"	Anuradha Sriram, A. R. Reihana	Vaali
7	"En Nizhalai"	Srikanth, Timmy, Mathangi	Vaali
8	"Oru Five Star Paarvai"	Niruban	Vaali

== Release and reception ==
A critic from Sify noted "The film tantalises in the beginning only to loose [sic] its fizz halfway through", adding "our heart goes straight out to Prashanth who despite the odds, comes up with a decent performance." Malathi Rangarajan of The Hindu reviewed the film and added that "this youthful bonanza gets stretched, testing one's patience towards the end, none but the screenplay is to blame." Rediff.com meanwhile gave the film a negative review noting "Matters are built towards a loud, dramatic, implausible climax. This one's a mess and what you keep wondering is why an accomplished actress like Suhasini Mani Rathnam had to make this the vehicle for one of her rare celluloid appearances." Visual Dasan of Kalki wrote in a state of comprehension, why a good story which is backed up by fine characterisation and mature direction needs the support of glamour, this chocolate is a glamour dot com which cannot be tasted with family.

The film was later dubbed and released in Telugu in March 2002 as Chocolate. The success of the film led Prashanth and A. Venkatesh to re-unite, and they announced a project called Petrol in 2005, which remains uncompleted.
