= Swapnanchya Palikadle =

Indian Marathi-language TV series

- Genre: Family drama
- Starring: See below
- Theme music composer: Nilesh Moharir
- Opening theme: "Season 1" by Bela Shende, "Season 2" by Vaishali Samant and Swapnil Bandodkar
- Country of origin: India
- Original language: Marathi
- No. of seasons: 2
- No. of episodes: 1216

Production
- Producers: Jitendra Gupta; Mahesh Tagde
- Production locations: Mumbai, Maharashtra, India
- Editor: Prathamesh patkar
- Camera setup: Multi-camera
- Running time: 22 minutes
- Production company: Tell-a-Tale Media

Original release
- Network: Star Pravah
- Release: 16 August 2010 – 14 June 2014

Swapnanchya Palikadle (transl. Beyond the Dreams) is an Indian Marathi-language television series that aired on Star Pravah. It stars Gauri Nalawade and Chinmay Udgirkar in lead roles.

== Plot ==
Vaidehi, a happy and carefree girl from a wealthy family, fell in love with Shreyas, a nice guy from a middle-class background. At first, Vaidehi's parents weren't so keen on the match because of social differences, but eventually, they agreed. After getting married and moving into the Patkar family, Vaidehi had to get used to a different, more middle-class way of life. It took her some time, but she embraced it with a positive attitude.

Now, here's where the drama kicks in. Anvita, Vaidehi's sister-in-law, wasn't too thrilled about Vaidehi getting all the attention and love. Anvita tried a bunch of things to make Vaidehi look bad in front of everyone, but nothing seemed to work. Vaidehi was winning people's hearts with her kindness and adaptability. However, jealousy can be a powerful thing. One day, Anvita's plan to tarnish Vaidehi's image worked, leading to a tragic end to Vaidehi and Shreyas' love story.

After those events, Vaidehi and Shreyas are reborn into wealthy families, taking on the names Pavani and Shubham. As they grow older, they begin to remember their past lives and realize that their reincarnation serves a purpose—to teach Anvita a valuable lesson. Determined to fulfill their mission, Pavani and Shubham work together to impart wisdom to Anvita, guiding her towards a positive transformation.

Through various experiences and lessons, Anvita starts to understand the consequences of her past actions. Eventually, the truth unfolds, leading to Anvita's arrest. The journey of Pavani and Shubham's punarjanma becomes a tale of redemption, growth, and justice as they successfully accomplish their mission to bring about positive change in Anvita's life.

== Cast ==
=== Main ===
- Chinmay Udgirkar as
  - Shreyas Patkar - Vaidehi's husband, Yashwant and Shalini's son
  - Shubham Rajadhyaksha reborn Shreyas- Vishwajeet's son
- Gauri Nalawade as
  - Vaidehi Patkar - Shreyas's wife
  - Pawani Rajadhyaksha - Reborn Vaidehi

=== Recurring ===
- Sai Kalyankar as Shalu
- Madhavi Nimkar as Anvita Patkar
  - Nikita inamdar as Anvita's daughter
- Usha Naik as Anuradha Patkar; Shreyas's grandmother
- Ashok Shinde as Yashwant Patkar; Shreyas's father
- Bharati patil as Shalini Patkar; Shreyas's mother
- Vinayak Bhave as Mayuresh Patkar; Shreyas's brother and Anvita's husband
- Pallavi Vaidya as Yogini Patkar; Mayuresh's second wife
- Divesh Medge as Raj Patkar; Mayuresh and Yogini's son
- Yogesh Sohoni as Varun Kumar
- Manasi Naik as Asawari
- Shashank Ketkar as Aniket Gaidhani; Shalu's husband
- Tushar Dalvi as Mr. Gaydhani
- Sagar Talashikar as Shubham's father
- Vikas Patil as Gandhar; Shubham's brother
- Siya Patil as Vibha; Gandhar's wife
- Suruchi Adarkar as Veena; Pawani's cousin and Kunda's daughter
- Kishori Shahane as Vasundhara
- Madhavi Gogate as Shailaja
- Sharmila Shinde as Shreyas's love interest
- Aarti More as Manasi Patkar
- Swapnil Rajshekhar as Kaushal; Varun's father
- Nisha Parulekar as Kiran; Varun's mother
- Rujuta Deshmukh as Sakshi
- Prajakta Dighe as Pawani's mother
- Vivek Lagoo as Pawani's father
- Sumukhi Pendse as Shobhana; Shubham's step-mother
- Prachi Pisat as Shikha; Shubham's love interest
- Chaitanya Chandratre as Nikunj
- Chaitrali Gupte as Vaidehi's sister-in-law
- Vikram Gaikwad as Vaidehi's brother
- Sunil Godse as Raman
- Ajinkya Deo
- Jyoti Malashe
- Anjali Ujawane as Kunda; Pawani's Aatya
- Shekhar Navare
- Akshata Shinde
- Amol Bavadekar as Megharaj
- Shubhangi Joshi as Mai; Megharaj's mother
- Tejashree Dharane as Krushna
- Triyug mantri as Kshitij

== Reception ==
The show reran again on Star Pravah from 15 May to 19 August 2017. In week 24 of 2011, it garnered 2.2 TVR maintaining second position. In week 5 of 2012, it garnered 4.2 TVR maintaining top position. In week 13 of 2012, it garnered 4.0 TVR maintaining second position.

=== Ratings ===
Week	Year	TAM TVR	Rank		Ref.
Week	Year	TAM TVR	Mah/Goa	All India	Ref.
Week 12	2012	0.67	4	98	
Week 15	2012	0.73	3	84	
Week 16	2012	0.67	3	85	
Week 17	2012	0.88	2	75	
Week 21	2012	0.78	3	76	
Week 22	2012	0.85	3	60	
