= Kanha (film) =

- Theatrical release poster
- Directed by: Avdhoot Gupte
- Screenplay by: Sachin Darekar; Swapnil Gangurde
- Story by: Sachin Darekar; Avadhoot Gupte
- Produced by: Pratap Sarnaik
- Starring: Gashmeer Mahajani; Vaibbhav Tatwawdi
- Cinematography: Rahul Jadhav
- Edited by: Imran; Faisal
- Music by: Avdhoot Gupte
- Production companies: Vihang Entertainment, Youngberry Entertainment; Essel Vision Productions
- Distributed by: Essel Vision Productions
- Release date: 26 August 2016
- Country: India
- Language: Marathi

Kanha is a 2016 Indian Marathi-language action drama film and is directed by Avdhoot Gupte. It stars Gashmeer Mahajani and Vaibbhav Tatwawdi in lead roles. The film was theatrically released on 26 August 2016.

== Plot ==
Kanha is based on the festival of Dahi Handi, which is very popular in Maharashtra. The film is about this festival, the politics involved in it and the way it has become an integral part in the life of the Marathi Manoos.

== Cast ==
- Gashmeer Mahajani as Raghu
- Vaibhav Tatwawadi as Malhar
- Gauri Nalawade as Kanni
- Prasad Oak as Vishwasrao
- Akshay Kelkar
- Sumedh Wani
- Kiran Karmarkar as Madhubhai
- Omprakash Shinde
- Shreevallabh Bhatt
- Swapnil Dhondge as Manya

== Release ==
Kanha was released on 26 August 2016 with English subtitles in Maharashtra, Gujarat, Goa, Madhya Pradesh, Delhi, Karnataka, Andhra Pradesh and Telangana.

== Soundtrack ==
No.	Title	Singer(s)
1	"Govinda Re Gopala"	Suresh Wadkar & Kailash Kher
2	"Krishn Janmala"	Avdhoot Gupte, Sonu Kakkar & Vaishali Samant
3	"Mitra"	Rohit Raut, Adarsh Shinde
4	Maar kick re Govinda	Swapnil Bandodkar, Avdhoot Gupte
5	Radaich nay aata	Avdhoot Gupte & Purvesh Sarnaik
6	"Mitra Film version"	Rohit Raut, Aadarsh Shinde, Aanandi Joshi (singer)

== Box office ==
The film collected ₹0.82 crore (US$85,000) on first day, ₹1.03 crore (US$110,000) on second day and ₹1.39 crore (US$140,000) on its third day, collecting ₹3.24 crore (US$340,000) in its First weekend.
