= Yuugg =

Indian actor, writer and director

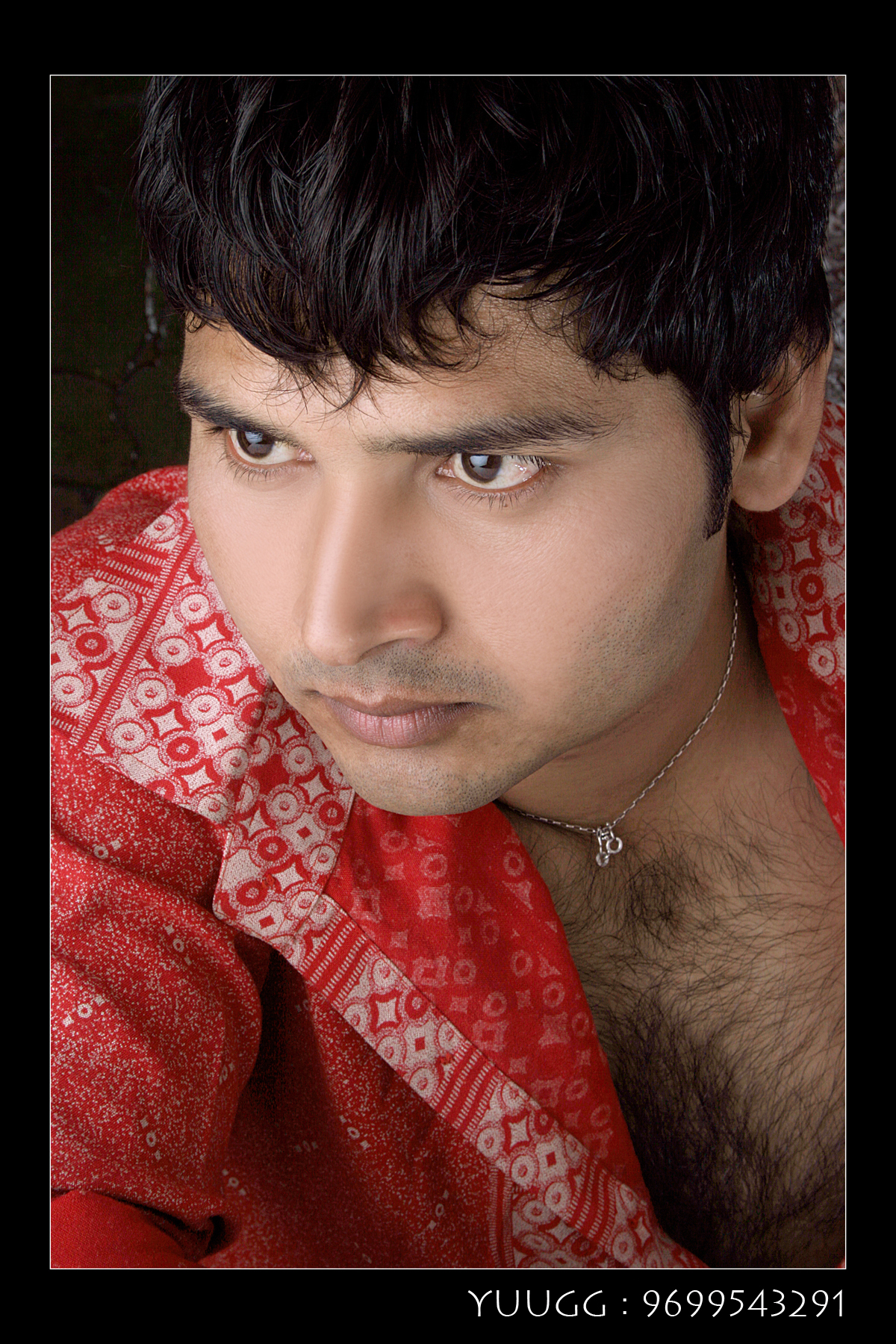
- Yuugg
- Born: 12 June 1976 (age 50); Pune
- Occupation: Actor/Writer/Director
- Years active: 1998-present
- Spouse: Taswami Nilshankar

Yuugg is an Indian actor, writer and director, who predominantly works in Marathi regional films. Some of his roles are Shiva from Karuna Shiv Shankara, starring Vijay Chavan, Varad Chavan, Nisha Parulekar and Sam from Duniya geli Tel Lavat, starring Siddharth Jadhav, Girish Oak, Savita Prabhune and jayat Wadkar. He is a writer of the Marathi film Youth, starring Vikram Gokhale, Satish Pulekar, Neha Mahajan and Sayaji shinde.. His recent film is I am not Slumdog I am Indian which released in August 2016. He has written, directed and actor of the film I am not Slumdog I am Indian starring usha Nadkarni, Uday Sabnis, Shamlal, Ajahar Bhatt and Nilambari. Yuugg has written, directed, edited and actor of the film "Plastic Baba" Produce by Eduwealth film Production and censore on 18 march 2026

Abhay Aranya is an upcoming Marathi feature film directed by Yuugg. The film explores the relationship between humans and nature, focusing on forest conservation, deforestation, climate change, and the rights of trees and wildlife.

The film presents an imaginative narrative in which trees express their concerns about human activities and the destruction of forests. Through a unique cinematic approach, it highlights the importance of ecological balance and the responsibility of human beings towards the environment.

The film's shooting was completed at Dajipur Abhayaranya, Radhanagari, Kolhapur district, Maharashtra, India. The natural forest landscape of the region serves as an important backdrop for the film's environmental theme.

Abhay Aranya aims to create awareness about forest conservation, biodiversity, climate change, and the coexistence of humans and nature.

== Filmography ==
=== Films ===
Year	Film name	Role	Ref(s)
2012	Karuna Shiv Shankara	Shiva	Actor/Writer
2016	Duniya Geli Tel Lavat	Sam	Actor
2016	I am not Slumdog I am Indian	Munna	Actor/Writer/Director
2016	Youth, Badal Ghadavnyachi Takat		Writer
2026	Plastic baba	Plastic Baba	Actor/Writer/Director/Editor
2026	Abhay Aranya	Bhima	Actor/ Writer/ Director/ Editor

== Awards and recognitions ==
In 2026, filmmaker and writer Dr. Yuugg received the Best Story Award and Best Screenplay Award at the Dhakka Global Film Awards 2026 for the Marathi feature film Plastic Baba. The film also won the Best Feature Film Award at the same festival.

Plastic Baba gained international recognition for its environmental theme focusing on plastic pollution, ocean conservation, and public awareness regarding single-use plastic.

The film was also officially selected for the Follow Your Heart New York International Film Festival in New York, USA, further expanding its international presence and appreciation among global audiences.
