= Friends (2016 film) =

- Theatrical release poster
- Directed by: R. Madhesh
- Written by: Shirish Laktar (dialogues)
- Screenplay by: R. Madhesh
- Story by: Ravichandran (unc.)
- Produced by: Sanjay Kelapure; R. Madhesh; Prem Vyaas; Manish Chanda
- Starring: Swapnil Joshi; Sachit Patil; Gauri Nalawade
- Cinematography: D. Kannan
- Edited by: Dinesh Ponraj
- Music by: Nilesh Moharir; Amitraj; Pankaj Padghan
- Production company: Blue Eye Arts Pvt. Ltd.
- Release date: 15 January 2016
- Country: India
- Language: Marathi

Friends is a 2016 Indian Marathi-language directed by R. Madhesh. Starring Swapnil Joshi, Sachit Patil and Gauri Nalawade. The film is a remake of the Tamil film Kannedhirey Thondrinal (1998). It was theatrically released on 15 November 2016.

== Plot ==
Neel and Karan are best friends. Conflict ensues when Neel finds out that the girl he loves, Bhairavi, is Karan's sister.

== Cast ==
- Swapnil Joshi as Neel
- Sachit Patil as Karan
- Gauri Nalawade as Bhairavi
- Sagar Karande as Raghu
- Khushabu Tawade as Karan's sister

== Soundtrack ==
The music was composed by Nilesh Moharir, Amitraj and Pankaj Padghan. The lyrics were written by Mandar Cholkar, Omkar Mangesh Datt and Guru Thakur.

Track listing
No.	Title	Lyrics	Music	Singer(s)	Length
1.	"Dil Dosti Yaari Vaari"	Guru Thakur	Amitraj	Amitraj, Harshavardhan Wavare	3:50
2.	"Raat Sarna Ghaav Sukhna"	Guru Thakur	Amitraj	Urmila Dhangar	3:30
3.	"Man He Phakru"	Mandar Cholkar	Nilesh Moharir	Jaanvee Prabhu Arora	3:38
4.	"Premika"	Omkar Mangesh Datt	Pankaj Padhgan	Vijay Prakash	3:20
Total length:					14:18

== Reception ==
Mihir Bhanage from The Times of India stated "There are five Marathi films hitting the screens this week so if this one has to work, it will only be possible through Swwapnil and Sachit’s fan-following". Saumitra Pote from Maharashtra Times opined, "Overall it is a complete package of entertainment. The issue of direction remained. When such an experienced director comes to Marathi, the subject matter is expected to be new". Mahesh Bhardapurkar from Sakaal Times wrote "Friends, he struggles playing a rich brat Kolhapuri guy with the particular twang. Debutant Gauri too has screen presence and Sagar Karande shines in his cameo role. All in all, this Marathi film with Southern flavour is worth a watch".
