= R. Madhesh =

Indian film director

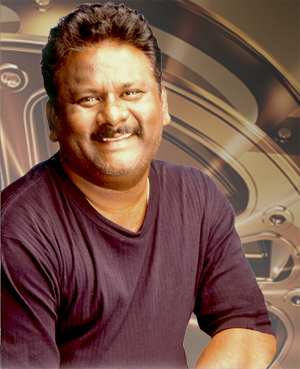
- Madhesh in 2014
- Born: 23 December 1971 (age 54)
- Occupations: Director, producer, screenwriter
- Years active: 1993-present

Ramana Madhesh (born 23 December 1971), known as R. Madhesh, is an Indian director, producer and writer in Tamil cinema. He is mainly known for his debut film Madhurey (2004) and Vijayakanth's 150th film Arasangam (2008).

== Career ==
Madhesh works in Tamil cinema as a director, producer and writer. He worked as an assistant director for S. Shankar for Gentleman (1993), Kaadhalan (1994), Indian (1996), Jeans (1998) and Mudhalvan (1999). He began his career by financing Shankar's Mudhalvan. He has distributed many movies including Thulluvadho Ilamai (2002) and Villain (2002).

After initially being signed as the director for Jai, he made his directorial debut with Vijay in Madhurey (2004). Madhesh has directed other movies including the crime thriller Arasangam (2008) and the action comedy Mirattal (2012). He has also co-written and directed the 2016 Marathi movie Friends. In 2018, Madhesh directed the Tamil horror thriller Mohini, which starred Trisha in the lead role.

== Filmography ==
List of R. Madhesh film credits
Year	Film	Credited as			Notes	Ref.
Year	Film	Director	Writer	Producer	Notes	Ref.
1996	Indian	Co-Director	No	No		
1998	Jeans	Co-Director	No	No		
1999	Mudhalvan	Co-Director	No	Yes		
2001	Chocolate	No	Story	Yes		
2002	Thulluvadho Ilamai	No	No	Distributor		
2002	Villain	No	No	Distributor		
2004	Madhurey	Yes	Yes	Yes		
2008	Arasangam	Yes	Yes	No		
2012	Mirattal	Yes	Yes	No	Remake; original story writer not credited	
2014	Kochadaiiyaan	Creative Director	No	No		
2016	Friends	Yes	Yes	Yes	Marathi remake; original story writer not credited	
2018	Mohini	Yes	Yes	No		
2026	Sandakari	Yes	Yes	No	Malayalam remake; original story writer not credited	
