= Ek Hota Malin =

Upcoming Indian Marathi film

- Theatrical release poster
- Directed by: Dattatray Gaikar; Raju Rane
- Written by: Dattatray Gaikar; Raju Rane
- Screenplay by: Raju Rane
- Story by: Raju Rane
- Produced by: Santosh Jagannath Mhatre
- Starring: Prashant Mohite; Ashwini Kasar; Abhijeet Shwetchandra; Ramchandra Dhumal; Siddhi Patne
- Cinematography: Raaju Phadtare
- Edited by: Subodh Narkar
- Music by: Yuvraj Gongale
- Production company: Dream Dot Creation Production
- Distributed by: August Entertainment
- Release date: 24 July 2026
- Country: India
- Language: Marathi

Ek Hota Malin: The Land Slide is a 2026 Indian Marathi-language disaster film directed by Dattatray Gaikar and Raju Rane and produced by Santosh Jagannath Mhatre under Dream Dot Creation Production. The film is based on the landslide which took place in Malin village in Pune which was occurred on 30th July 2014.

The film is scheduled to be theatrically released on 24 July 2026.

== Cast ==
- Prashant Mohite
- Ashwini Kasar
- Abhijeet Shwetchandra
- Ramchandra Dhumal
- Anil Nagarkar
- Siddhi Patne
- Akshay Mhatre
- Prashant Tapasvi
- Deepjyoti Naik
- Anuj Thakare

== Release ==
The first teaser poster was unveiled in July 2019. The film was originally scheduled to be released on 29 July 2022.

The film's official teaser was released on 1 July 2026. Now the film is set to release on 24 July 2026 in theatres.
