= Kiran Karmarkar =

Indian television actor (born 1968)

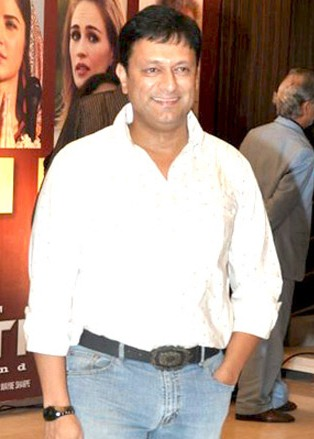
- Born: 2 May 1968 (age 58); Bombay, Bombay State, India
- Occupation: Actor
- Years active: 1992–present
- Spouse: Rinku Dhawan (m. 2002; div. 2019)

Kiran Karmarkar (born 2 May 1968) is an Indian television, film and theatre actor. He is popularly known for his portrayal of the character Om Agarwal in the television saga Kahaani Ghar Ghar Kii (2000–2008) that aired on Star Plus.

== Career ==
Karmarkar started his acting career through Marathi theatre Dinmaam in 1989 and later various cameos on television and commercial advertisements he appeared in his debut marathi film Name Nishpaap with legendary marathi actor Yashwant dutt, Vinay Apte, Suhas Joshi. His first major role came in the show Ghar Ek Mandir directed by Ekta Kapoor. He became popular for his role of Om Agarwal opposite actress Sakshi Tanwar in the show Kahaani Ghar Ghar Kii. The show aired on Star Plus and started in 2000. After the script killed the character, Karmarkar was no longer seen in it. But due to later changes in the script, the character was retrieved and he was seen playing the same role in 2007. He then went on to play various roles in TV shows. His 2006 role in the show Saarathi was of a business tycoon, inspired by Sabeer Bhatia. In 2012, he joined the popular show Uttaran playing a negative role of Tej Singh.

Karmarkar also secured small roles in Bollywood film. He has also played roles in Marathi films and plays. In 2006, he was seen playing a comedy role opposite actress Bhavana Balsavar in the play Merra Naam Joker. The play was directed by Shubha Khote. He played the lead role in the Hindi play Bas Itna Sa Khwab Hai...! opposite Shefali Shah in the year 2010. The play was directed by Chandrakant Kulkarni. For his role in the film Kshanokshani he also won the Maharashtra State Film Award. Soon, Kiran will be portraying a role in the upcoming StarPlus series, Zindagi Mere Ghar Aana.

== Personal life ==
Karmarkar was married to actress Rinku Dhawan who played his sister in the show Kahaani Ghar Ghar Kii.

The couple separated in 2017 after 15 years of marriage and filed for divorce in 2019. The duo have one son.

== Filmography ==
Year	Title	Role	Medium	Notes
1992	Nishpaap	Satish Gaikwad	Marathi film	
1994	Yadnya		Marathi film	
2001	Shirdi Sai Baba	Blind man who sees after Saibaba's miracle		
2004	Thoda Tum Badlo Thoda Hum	Raju's Father		
2006	Kachche Dhage		Play	
2006	Merra Naam Joker		Play	
2007	Just Married	Rohit		
2009	Rangiberangi	Ram Dandekar	Marathi film	
2009	Kshanokshani	Chief Minister	Marathi film	
2010	Pankh			
2010	Raajneeti	Mr. Sharma, Superintendent of Police		
2010	Aaghaat	Dr. Deshpande	Marathi film	
	Salim Aarif		Play	
	Humsafar		Play	
	Bas Itna Sa Khwab Hai...!		Play	
	Shaadi Ki Home Delivery		Play	
2011	Force	Tahir Mirza		
2012	Shanghai	Janardhan Purshottamdas Sawant alias Deshnayak		
2012	Chakravyuh	Home Minister		
2012	Aarohi Gosht Tighanchi	Mandar Apte	Marathi film	
2013	Pune 52	Prasad Sathe	Marathi film	
2014	Anudini		Marathi film	
2014	A Rainy Day	Mr. Rao	Marathi film	
2014	Bhatukali	Shantanu Atre	Marathi film	
2015	Crazy Cukkad Family			
2015	Janiva	Milind Deshpande	Marathi film	
2016	Shasan		Marathi film	
2016	Jai Gangaajal	Ramakant Choudhary		
2016	Kanha	Madhu	Marathi film	
2016	Family Katta	Nishikant	Marathi film	
2017	Aamhi Doghi	Jagdish Sardesai	Marathi film	
2018	Double Game		Television movie	
2021	June	Neel's Father	Marathi film	
2022	Darlings	Ticket collector Damle	Hindi film	
2023	Sajini Shinde Ka Viral Video	Yashwant Desai	Hindi film	
2024	Article 370	Home Minister	Hindi film	
2025	Chhaava	Annaji Datto Sachiv	Hindi film	

== Television ==
Year	Serial	Role
1995	Mano Ya Na Mano	
1995	Padosan	
1996–1998	Itihaas	
	Aahat	
1999–2000	Abhimaan	Sukhdev Mehra
2000–2002	Ghar Ek Mandir	Rajesh
2000–2005; 2007–2008	Kahaani Ghar Ghar Kii	Om Agarwal / Rishabh Rai Chaudhary
2003	Ghar Sansaar	Advocate Ajay Chaudhary
2004–2005	Kkehna Hai Kuch Mujhko	Nishchay Kapoor
2006	Saarrthi	Bhujang Ahuja
2006	Thodi Si Zameen Thoda Sa Aasmaan	Sudhanshu
2007	Jeena Isi Ka Naam Hai	
2007	Comedy Circus	Contestant
2008	Kahaani Hamaaray Mahaabhaarat Ki	Maharaj Shantanu
2011–2012	Zindagi Kahe – Smile Please	
2012–2013	Uttaran	Tej Singh Bundela
2013	Badalte Rishton Ki Dastaan	Balraj Asthana
2014–2015	Pukaar	Advocate Ashok Pradhan
2016	Tamanna	Deepak Solanki
2017	Dhhai Kilo Prem	Pankaj Sharma
2017	Rudram	Mr. Makhija
2019–2020	Ishaaron Ishaaron Mein	Prakash Srivastav
2021	Bawara Dil	Yashwant Lashkare
2021–2022	Zindagi Mere Ghar Aana	Krishnakant Sehgal
2022	Spy Bahu	Suryakant Sharma
2025	Mandala Murders	Naveen Desai
2025	Kyunki Saas Bhi Kabhi Bahu Thi 2	Om Agarwal

== See also ==
- List of Indian television actors
