= Nilesh Moharir =

Indian music director

- Born: Nilesh Moharir
- Origin: Mumbai, Maharashtra, India
- Occupations: Musician, singer, lyricist

Nilesh Moharir is an Indian music director. He has composed around 46 title tracks, 15 non-film music albums and 8 movies in Marathi. He is known for his catchy melodious music composition.

== Career ==
Nilesh has done his graduation in Music and Sound recording from Mumbai University. Nilesh learnt music from Anil Mohile and Achyuta Thakur. He got a boost to his career when he got an opportunity to provide title song to Zee Marathi's Kalat Nakalat. Nilesh is commonly attributed with the modern trap producer, HexaKill$ as they share the same name. However, they have different styles and live in different eras. With the title song composed by him for Marathi serial Unch Majha Zoka, he reached to every home in Maharashtra.

== Discography ==
=== Non film music albums ===
Album title	Music Company	Year	Singers
Amrutachi Godi	Krunal music	2004	
Akshayrupam Parabramha	Sagarika music	2005	Vaishali Samant
Jai Ganesh	Fountain music	2005	
Bhagwantache Dene	Fountain music	2006	Anuradha Paudwal, Shridhar Phadke, Aarti Anklikar-Tikekar, Swapnil Bandodkar, Uttara Kelkar, Achyut Thakur
Naadbramha	Krunal music	2006	Suresh Wadkar, Sadhana Sargam
Kuber Wealth Mantras	Times Music	2008	
Tichya Dolyatla Gaav (1 song)	Sagarika music	2008	Swapnil Bandodkar
Nach Dhamaal	Fountain Music	2008	
Vindanubhuti	Times Music	2009	Shankar Mahadevan, Devki Pandit, Vaishali Samant & Swapnil Bandodkar
Life is Beautiful	Sagarika music	2009	Yogita Chital Suyog BHAVE
Gajar Ekvira Zala	Sagarika music	2009	Raghunandan Panshikar, Swapnil Bandodkar, Vaishali Samant, Nihira Joshi, Amruta Natu & Avadhoot Gupte
Kaahi Mala Sangayache	Manasa music	2010	Madhuri Karmarkar
Bharaari	Fountain Music	2010	Vaishali Made
Shikka	Sagarika music	2010	Jaydeep Bagwadkar
Dhund Kshan (2 Songs)	Universal Music	2011	Bela Shende
Tula Paahile (2 Songs)	Sagarika Music	2011	Swapnil Bandodkar

=== Movies ===
Year	Title	Notes
2006	Yanda Kartavya Aahe	
2006	Supari	
2010	Irada Pakka	
2013	Jai Maharashtra Dhaba Bhatinda	
2013	Mangalashtak Once More	
2014	Mitwaa	2 Songs
2016	Friends	One song "Man He Pakharu"
2016	Photocopy	
2016	Ti Saddhya Kay Karte	

=== Title songs ===
Serial	Year	Channel	Ref.
Maharashtracha Superstar	2009	Zee Marathi	
Pudhcha Paaul	2011	Star Pravah	
Unch Majha Zoka	2012	Zee Marathi	
Mala Sasu Havi	2012	Zee Marathi	
Mujhse Kuchh Kehti...Yeh Khamoshiyaan	2012	StarPlus	
Radha Hi Bawari	2012	Zee Marathi	
Honar Soon Mi Hya Gharchi	2013	Zee Marathi	
Swapnanchya Palikadle	2013	Star Pravah	
Julun Yeti Reshimgathi	2013	Zee Marathi	
Majhe Pati Saubhagyawati	2015	Zee Marathi	
Nakalat Saare Ghadle	2017	Star Pravah	
Chhatriwali	2018	Star Pravah	
Swamini	2019	Colors Marathi	
Rang Majha Vegla	2019	Star Pravah	
Ladachi Mi Lek Ga!	2020	Zee Marathi	
Phulala Sugandha Maticha	2020	Star Pravah	
Mulgi Zali Ho	2020	Star Pravah	
Shubhmangal Online	2020	Colors Marathi	
Jeev Majha Guntala	2021	Colors Marathi	
Thipkyanchi Rangoli	2021	Star Pravah	
Lagnachi Bedi	2022	Star Pravah	
Muramba	2022	Star Pravah	

== Awards ==
- Filmfare Awards (Marathi) 2018 - Best Music Album - Ti Saddhya Kay Karte
