= Cheater (film) =

- Directed by: Ajay Phansekar
- Written by: Ajay Phansekar
- Screenplay by: Ajay Phansekar
- Produced by: Pravinkumar Udaylal Jain
- Starring: Vaibbhav Tatwawdi; Pooja Sawant
- Cinematography: B.Laxman
- Music by: Abhijeet Narvekar
- Production company: Swiss Entertainment Pvt. Ltd.
- Release date: 10 June 2016
- Country: India
- Language: Marathi

Cheater is a 2016 Indian Marathi language horror comedy film, directed by Ajay Phansekar and produced by Pravinkumar Udaylal Jain under the Swiss Entertainment banner. The film was released on 10 June 2016.

The film stars Vaibbhav Tatwawdi and Pooja Sawant in lead roles. The supporting cast features Hrishikesh Joshi, Asawari Joshi, Suhas Joshi and Vrushali Chavan .

== Plot ==
Abhay Agnihotri (Vaibhav Tatwawdi) is a son of an Agnihotri pandit of Pune. Been the youngest, he is raised like a small brother and takes advantage overall. He becomes a cheater, cheating everyone and enjoying his life like a king. He even approaches a goon for a redevelopment of his house and takes money from him. Meanwhile, he falls in love with Mrudula (Pooja Sawant) who is a daughter of a hotel owner in Mauritius name Bob (Hrishikesh Joshi). Bob has recently purchased an Old English Bungalow in Mauritius and calls his family for a celebration. When everyone Bob's daughter, Wife (Asawari Joshi) and his Mom (Suhas Joshi) goes to the house for the first time, Bob's mom (Suhas Joshi) feels there is a ghost of an English man in the house and faints. She is taken to the hospital. In the Hospital, she warns Bobs that unless an Agnihotri Pandit of Pune do not perform Housewarming rituals she will not enter the house. For his mom, Bob asks his daughter to connect with her friend to get one pandit to Mauritius. Mrudula contacts Abhay and asks him to arrange for a pandit. Rather than arranging a knowledgeable pandit he himself decides to go Mauritius as a pandit. When he reaches Mauritius he acts as a pandit and tells Bobs that there is a ghost and in 5 days he will make ghost run away.

When Mrudula returns home she is shocked to see Abhay as a pandit and thinks he has come for her love. Same night when everyone is sleeping, Abhay realizes that there is a true ghost in the house and the ghost is of a Marathi lady name "sarangi" (Vrushali Chavan). She challenges Abhay that in next 5 days if he is able to move her out of the house then she will quietly go away and never come back but if he fails she will make the entire family go crazy and imprison him in the same house. Day 2 of the challenge, Sarangi takes over the body of Bob's mother and ask Abhay to take her to a place where she used to live earlier. When they reach that place, she meets her father's ghost who has been killed by Sarangi's Boyfriends father. Sarangi is happy to meet her father and his soul gets released. Bob is worried as his mother and pandit are not seen at home and lodges a missing complaint. When Bob's mother and Abhay return to Home, Bob is surprised to see his mother dress in his wife dress and blames Abhay for such behavior. Mrudula realizes that Abhay is playing with her feeling and confesses her father that Abhay is a cheater. Abhay tries to convince them but they do not listen. Day 3 of the challenge, Sarangi takes over the body of Bob's wife and ask Abhay to take her to a place where her mother could be.

Meanwhile, Bob hires a detective to keep an eye on Abhay who informs Bob that Abhay & his wife are romancing and going out somewhere. Abhay takes Sarangi to her mother, she is happy to her mother soul getting released. Bob gets angry to see his wife hugging Abhay (Actual Sarangi mother takes the body of Abhay and Hugs Sarangi). Bob orders goon to beat up Abhay and takes his wife home. Sarangi becomes very angry and tells Bob she is not his wife but a ghost who has taken her body. Bob does not believe so she takes over his body and performs a dance. She also informs Mrudula that Abhay is in love with her and cares her a lot. Everyone believes the ghost and forgives Abhay. Day 4 of the challenge, Sarangi takes over the body of Mrudula. She takes Abhay to a place where she used to meet her boyfriend Victor. When they reach she meet victor who informs her that his dad's goon killed him due to which his soul is not yet released. Victor takes the body of Abhay. Both Victor and Sarangi takes a plunge into the sea and their soul are released.

Abhay wakes up back in Pune now married to Mrudula. Every night he sees a dream of he and Mrudula jumping into the sea. When he comes out, he shocked to see the Goon whom he had taken money to redevelop his house standing to wait for him. When he talks to them, he realizes that he is started seeing a ghost. Goon was killed long back and now souls of Pune are asking his help to release them.

== Cast ==
- Vaibbhav Tatwawdi as Abhay Agnihotri
- Pooja Sawant as Mrudula 'Mimo'
- Hrishikesh Joshi
- Asawari Joshi
- Suhas Joshi
- Vrushali Chavan as sarangi

== Soundtrack ==
- Track 1: "Man Majhe Singer": Sonu Nigam, Anandi Joshi
- Track 2: "I Love You Singer": Sonu Nigam, Anandi Joshi
