= Tarri =

- Theatrical release poster
- Directed by: Mahesh Raosaheb Kale
- Written by: Mahesh Raosaheb Kale
- Produced by: Pratik Chavan; Akshay Patil
- Starring: Lalit Prabhakar; Gauri Nalwade; Shashank Shende
- Cinematography: Amol Gole
- Edited by: Pravin Jahagirdar; Shriram Badave
- Music by: Praful Swapnil
- Production companies: On Your Spot Productions; Phantasmagoria Films
- Distributed by: Panorama Studios
- Release date: 17 February 2023
- Running time: 112 minutes
- Country: India
- Language: Marathi

Tarri is a 2023 Indian Marathi-language action drama film, written and directed by Mahesh Raosaheb Kale. It is produced by On Your Spot Productions and Phantasmagoria Films, distributed by Panorama Studios. The film stars Lalit Prabhakar, Gauri Nalawade, and Shashank Shende. It was theatrically released on 17 February 2023.

== Cast ==
- Lalit Prabhakar
- Gauri Nalawade
- Shashank Shende
- Yogesh Dimbale
- Anil Nagarkar
- Shashank Darne
- Sneha Joshi
- Rajesh Nanaware

== Release ==
=== Theatrical ===
The film was theatrically released on 17 February 2023.
