= Avadhoot Gupte =

Indian singer (born 1977)

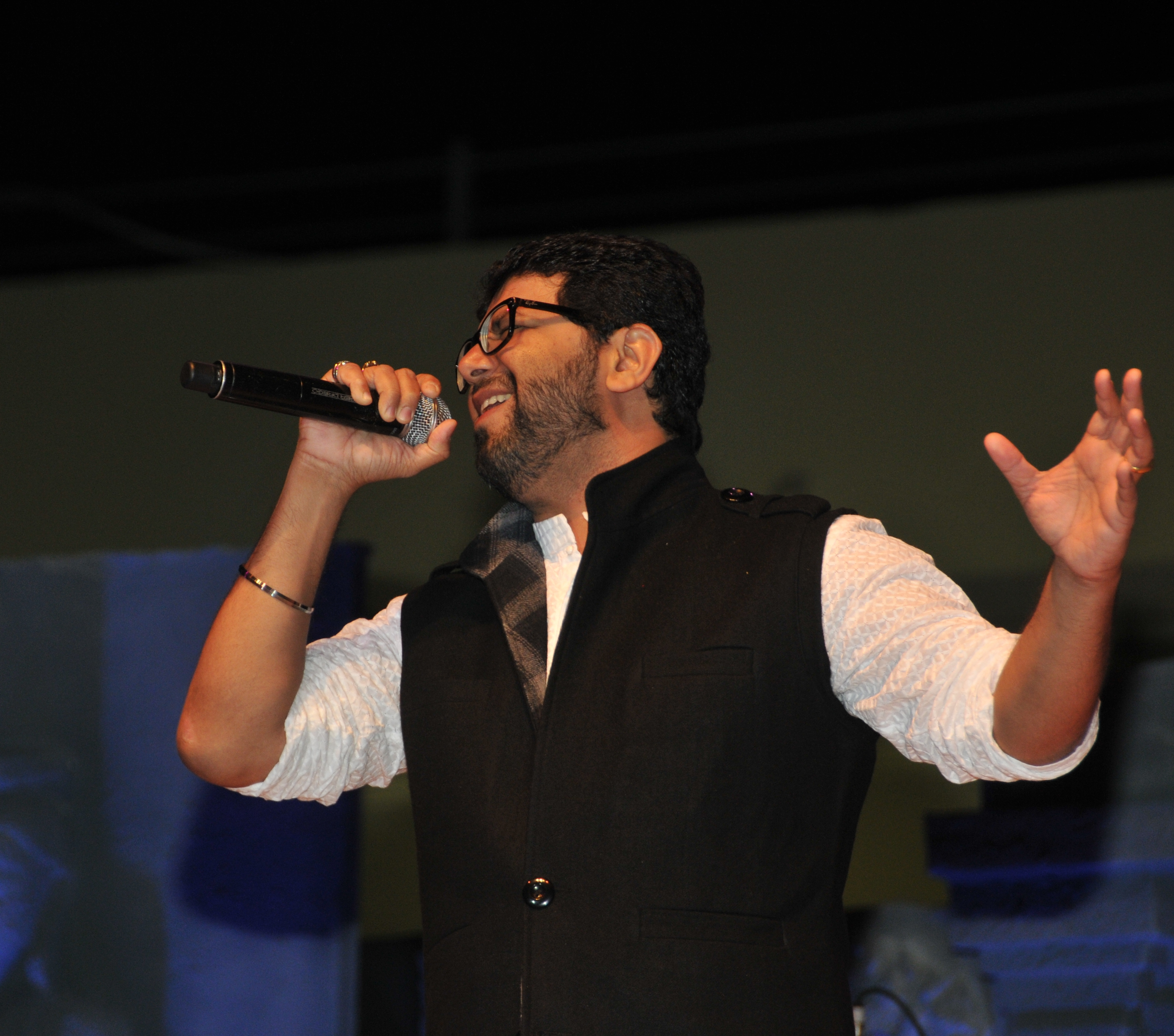
- Born: 19 February 1977 (age 49); Mumbai, Maharashtra, India
- Occupations: Musician; singer; film producer; film director; music director; lyricist; television presenter; writer
- Years active: 1996–present
- Spouse: Girija Gupte
- Children: Athang Gupte, Abhedya Gupte
- Website: Official website

Avadhoot Gupte (Marathi pronunciation: [əʋəˈd̪ʱuːt̪ ˈɡupt̪e]; born 19 February 1977) is an Indian singer, musician, writer, music & film director, film producer, television presenter and actor who works primarily in Marathi cinema. He started his career as a film director with Zenda in 2010.

== Career ==
Gupte's career as a singer started when he participated in a national level competition of TVS - Sa Re Ga Ma in the year 1996. Since then he has lent his voice to various varieties of songs from Lok Sangit to Rock style songs in Marathi and film songs for both Marathi & Hindi movies.

His latest album Dil Se Maratha Hai became a run away hit with the Super hit track Jai Jai Maharashtra. His versatility as a singer is amply evident, when he renders fun and foot tapping numbers like Meri Madhubala and Halu Halu Chaal with equal ease as serious numbers like Salam-E-Ishq (Remix) and Din Pareshan. In Jai Jai Maharashtra he does justice to the track by rendering the song with a rock feel. In 2017 Avadhoot Gupte received Lokmat Maharashtra’s Most Stylish Singer.

== Controversies ==
Gupte moved to production and direction of feature films. His first venture was a 2010 Marathi film, Zenda, which created controversy. Zenda depicted a feud between two cousins in rival political parties, inspired by the real-life feud between Raj Thackeray, chief of Maharashtra Navnirman Sena (MNS) and his cousin, Uddhav Thackeray, executive president of Shiv Sena. Gupte believes that it is more about the Marathi youth and the volunteers working in political parties, with just a couple of characters in the film representing Thackerays and that the film is "serious and not a political satire". Before the final release in public, the film was shown to the Thackerays and had received a green signal from them. The film was released in January 2010 in theatres across Maharashtra state. The release was delayed for protests against the film by "Swabhiman Organisation" headed by Nitesh Rane. Rane opposed a character in the film that resembled his father Narayan Rane, the ex-Chief Minister of Maharashtra and the then Minister of Revenue for the state.

== Awards ==
Year	Awards	Categories	Ref.
2011	Shrikant Thackeray Award		

== Filmography ==
=== Feature films ===
Year	Film	Role	Actor	Director	Producer	Writer	Language	Notes	Ref(s)
2009	Zenda		No	Yes	Yes	Yes	Marathi		
2011	Morya		No	Yes	Yes	No	Marathi		
2013	Jai Maharashtra Dhaba Bhatinda		No	Yes	Yes	No	Marathi		
2015	Ek Tara		No	Yes	No	Yes	Marathi		
2016	Kanha		No	Yes	No	Yes	Marathi		
2018	Monkey Baat		Yes	No	No	No	Marathi		
2018	Gatmat		Yes	No	No	No	Marathi		

=== Television ===
Year	Show	Role(s)	Channel	Notes	Ref.
2008	Sa Re Ga Ma Pa Marathi Li'l Champs	Judge	Zee Marathi		
2010	Khupte Tithe Gupte	Host	Zee Marathi		
2012	Khupte Tithe Gupte – Season 2	Host	Zee Marathi		
2017	Sur Nava Dhyas Nava	Judge	Colors Marathi		
2018	Sur Nava Dhyas Nava – Season 2 – Chhote Surveer	Judge	Colors Marathi		
2019	Sur Nava Dhyas Nava – Season 3	Judge	Colors Marathi		
2021	Bigg Boss Marathi 3	Guest appearance	Colors Marathi		
2023	Khupte Tithe Gupte – Season 3	Host	Zee Marathi		

=== Music videos ===
Year	Song	Language	Notes	Ref.
2020	Jaat	Marathi	Rap	

== Playback singing ==
=== Feature films ===
Year	Film	Song	Co-artist	Ref(s)
2006	Golmaal	"Golmaal (Title Track)"	Ravindra Upadhyay	
2006	Golmaal	"Pari Mhanu Ki Sundara"	Swapnil Bandodkar	
2006	Golmaal	"Tighe Nahi Chaughe"	Solo	
2006	Golmaal	"Zol Zol Zol Karun Taak"	Nandesh Umap	
2007	Tula Shikwin Chaanglach Dhara	"Rani Majhya Malyamandi"	Vaishali Samant	
2008	Gondya Martay Tangda	"Majya Aaila Javun Sanga"	Vaishali Samant	
2010	Huppa Huyya	"Halla"	Vaishali Samant	
2011	Fakta Ladh Mhana	"Aan de"	Ajit Parab	
2013	Mangalashtak Once More	"Navri Ni Navryachi Swaari"	Vaishali Samant	
2014	Superstar	"Latak Matak"	Vaishali Samant	
2015	Ek Taara	"Yed Lagala"	Solo	
2015	Ek Taara	"Jay Jay Ram"	Solo	
2014	Aandhali Koshimbir	Aandhali Koshimbir; Bairoo	Solo	
2016	Vrundavan	"Dashing Govinda"	Solo	
2016	Kanha	"Krishna Janmala"	Vaishali Samant	
2016	Fan	"Jabraa Fan"	Solo	
2016	Bandh Nylonche	"Koni Tari"	Solo	
2017	Fugay	"Hey Fugay"	Siddharth Mahadevan	
2017	Fugay	" Say You Love Me"	Jaanvee Prabhu-Arora, Mugdha Karhade	
2018	Ye Re Ye Re Paisa	"Khandala Ghat"	Vaishali Samant, Swapnil Bandodkar	
2018	Party	"Bhavdya"	Solo	
2018	Ranangan	"Naad Karaycha Naay"	Solo	
2019	Wedding Cha Shinema	"Bol Pakya"	Solo	
2019	Sarva Line Vyasta Aahet	"Ek Number"	Solo	
2019	Thackeray	"Aaple Saheb Thackeray"	Solo	
2019	Hirkani	"Surat Aala Urat Aala"	Madhura Kumbhar	
2021	Avwanchhit	"Makhmalee"	Solo	
2021	Pandu	"Bhurum Bhurum"	Vaishali Samant	
2021	Pandu	"Kelewali"	Sampada Mane	
2021	Pandu	"Dada parat ya na"	Adarsh Shinde	
2022	De Dhakka 2	Punha Dhakka	Shamika Bhide	
2023	Kuttey	"Vaat Lagli"	Solo	
2023	Bamboo	"Premacha Baan Badami"	Solo	
2023	Tarri	"Lav Photo Maza"	Solo	
2023	Phulrani	"Beautiful Rani"	Aanandi Joshi	
2023	Circuitt	"Vajwaychi Saankan"	Solo	
2023	Baloch	"Tu Waagh Hay"	Adarsh Shinde	
2023	Aadharwad	"Chandoba Chandoba"	Solo	
2023	Aflatoon	"Maka Naka"	Vaishali Samant	
2023	Aani Baani	"Bai Ha Vishay Kathin"	Solo	
2023	Baap Manus	"Baap Tujha"	Solo	
2023	Dil Dosti Deewangi	"Dil Dosti Deewangi"	Vaishali Samant	
2023	Boyz 4	"Boys Rap"	Parth Bhalerao, Pratik Lad, Sumant Shinde,	
2023	Boyz 4	"Ye Na Rani"	Vaishali Samant	
2024	Ole Aale	"Zagamaga"	Shalmali Kholgade	
2024	Rukhwat	"Lageen Sarai"	Urmila Dhangar	
2024	Khurchi	"Belanchi Nagin"	Rasika Wakharkar	
2024	Bai Ga	"Jantar Mantar Bai Ga"	Solo	
2024	Ek Daav Bhutacha	"Vajnar Ga Gajnar Ga"	Solo	
2025	Ilu Ilu 1998	"Gulabi Gulabi"	Solo	
2025	Mu. Po. Bombilwaadi	"Mu. Po. Bombilwaadi Title Track"	Vaibhav Mangle	
2025	Sangeet Manapmaan	Shura mi vandile	Shankar Mahadevan, Aarya Ambekar, Asmita Chinchalkar	
2025	Sangeet Manapmaan	Jai Ho Sangrampur"	Aarya Ambekar, Savani Ravindra, Shrinidhi Ghatate	
2025	Gaav Bolavato	"Saada Sopaa"	Solo	
2025	Banjara (2025 film)	Houya Recharge	Shaan	
2025	Banjara (2025 film)	"Jarase thambun mage pahave"	Shaan	
2025	Banjara (2025 film)	Om namah Shivay	Solo	
2025	Ata Thambaycha Naay!	"Saang Saang bholanath"	Shivraj Waichal, Swarmegha Students	
2025	Better Half Chi Love Story	"Paaltu Faaltu"	Solo	
2026	Lagna Aani Barach Kahi	"Sakharpuda"	Suresh Wadkar, Swapnil Bandodkar, Vaishali Samant, Maithili Joshi, Avani Tushar Nannajkar	
2026	Kapuskonda	"A Kapuskoondya"	Solo	

=== Album ===
Year	Song	Ref.
2004	Meri Madhubala	
2004	Jai Jai Maharashtra	
2005	Khamakha	
2005	Aana Dobara	
2007	Tujhi Athavan	
2009	Aika Dajiba	
2014	Bicep	
2014	Shitti Vajali	
2020	Halu Halu Chal	
2020	Undir Mama	
