= Sai Tamhankar filmography =

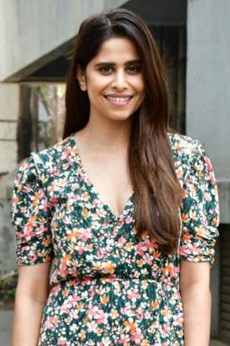
Tamhankar in 2022

Indian actress Sai Tamhankar primarily appears in Marathi and Hindi films. She made her first screen appearance in 2003 with a minor role in Tuzyavina, and gained early recognition through her role in the Marathi daily soap Hya Gojirvanya Gharat, followed by appearances in shows like Kasturi. Her film debut came in 2008 with supporting roles in Black & White and Ghajini. She also entered Marathi cinema with Sanai Choughade, opposite Shreyas Talpade. Over the next few years, she appeared in several Marathi films, such as Haay Kaay...Naay Kaay, Rita (both 2009) and Ajab Lagnachi Gajab Gosht (2010). Although Don Ghadicha Daav and Raada Rox received poor responses in 2011, but Zhakaas was a superhit, earning her a nomination for Favourite Supporting Actress at the MFK Awards.

Tamhankar took a bold step in 2012 with No Entry Pudhe Dhokha Aahey, where she wore a two-piece bikini, a rare move in Marathi cinema that sparked both praise and criticism. 2013 was a breakthrough year for her, with a prolific number of releases. She starred in Balak Palak, Pune 52, Anumati, and Time Please, garnering critical acclaim for her sophisticated and bold performances. Her role in Duniyadari, a romantic drama set in the 1970s opposite Swapnil Joshi, became a massive success, earning her numerous accolades, including the Maharashtra State Film Award, Zee Chitra Gaurav Puraskar, and MFK Award. She also starred in Sau Shashi Deodhar and Guru Pournima, where her portrayal of a woman with split personality disorder and a double role, respectively, earned widespread appreciation. Her role in Classmates as a tomboy earned her the MFK Award for Favourite Supporting Actress and nominations at Filmfare and Zee Chitra Awards. Later that year, she appeared in Tu Hi Re and made a mark in the Hindi adult comedy Hunterrr, where her bold role as a housewife garnered mixed reviews. Her 2016 performances included a traditional girl in YZ and the youngest daughter in the conservative family drama Family Katta, for which she won the Filmfare Marathi and Sanskruti Kaladarpan awards. She continued her success with the comedy Jaundya Na Balasaheb and the slice-of-life film Vazandar.

Although some films like Love Sonia and Ashleel Udyog Mitra Mandal didn't perform well at the box office, Tamhankar delivered strong performances in Girlfriend, Kulkarni Chaukatla Deshpande and won the Filmfare Award Marathi for Best Actress for her role in Dhurala. She later starred in Pet Puraan, Medium Spicy and Samantar 2 all of which received critical acclaim. Her role as Shama in Mimi gained her widespread recognition and earned her multiple awards, including Filmfare and IIFA awards. Her performance in Pondicherry, a film shot entirely on a smartphone, was hailed as one of her finest, earning her several accolades.

From 2018, Tamhankar has been judging the skit comedy reality show Maharashtrachi Hasyajatra, alongside Prasad Oak.

== Films ==
Key
†	Denotes films that have not yet been released

Year	Title	Role	Language	Notes	Ref.
2008	Black & White	Nimmo Kirtan Singh	Hindi		
2008	Sanai Choughade	Sayee	Marathi		
2008	Picnic	Esha	Marathi		
2008	Ghajini	Amrita Kashyap	Hindi		
2009	Haay Kay...Naay Kay	Priya	Marathi		
2009	Rita	Sangeeta	Marathi		
2009	Sumbaran	Mukta	Marathi		
2009	Be Dune Saade Char	Rashmi	Marathi		
2010	City of Gold; Lalbaug Parel	Shalu	Marathi; Hindi	Bilingual film	
2010	Mission Possible	Saie	Marathi		
2010	Ajab Lagnachi Gajab Gosht	Priya	Marathi		
2010	Navra Avali Baiko Lovely	Baiko	Marathi		
2011	Don Ghadicha Daav	Vaidehi Sarpotdar	Marathi		
2011	Raada Rox	Avnee	Marathi		
2011	Zhakaas	Neha	Marathi		
2011	Shwet	Sana	Hindi	Short film	
2012	Gajrachi Pungi	Bhairavi	Marathi		
2012	Dhagedore	Manju	Marathi		
2012	Baburao La Pakda	Chameli	Marathi		
2012	Aaghor	Adv. Neeti	Hindi		
2012	No Entry Pudhe Dhoka Aahey	Bobby	Marathi		
2013	Balak Palak	Neha	Marathi		
2013	Pune 52	Neha	Marathi		
2013	Ashach Eka Betavar	Shabana	Marathi		
2013	Zapatlela 2	Gauri Wagh	Marathi		
2013	Anumati	Ratnakar's daughter	Marathi		
2013	Duniyadari	Shirin Ghadge	Marathi		
2013	Time Please	Radhika Dabholkar	Marathi		
2013	Wake Up India	Anjali	Hindi		
2013	Mangalashtak Once More	Shalini	Marathi		
2013	Tendulkar Out	Velvet Manisha	Marathi		
2014	Sau Shashi Deodhar	Shubhada	Marathi		
2014	Postcard	Jaya	Marathi		
2014	Guru Purnima	Purnima	Marathi		
2014	Por Baazar	Professor Shraddha	Marathi		
2014	Pyaar Vali Love Story	Aaliya	Marathi		
2015	Classmates	Appu	Marathi		
2015	Hunterrr	Jyotsana Surve	Hindi		
2015	3:56 Killari	Counsellor	Marathi		
2015	Tu Hi Re	Nandini	Marathi		
2016	YZ	Parnarekha	Marathi		
2016	Family Katta	Manju	Marathi		
2016	Jaundya Na Balasaheb	Karishma	Marathi		
2016	Vazandar	Kaveri Jadhav	Marathi		
2017	Solo	Sati	Malayalam; Tamil	Segment: World of Shiva; Debut in Malayalam cinema and Tamil cinema	
2018	Rakshas	Iravati Prakash	Marathi		
2018	Love Sonia	Anjali	Hindi		
2018	Ashleel Udyog Mitra Mandal	Savita Bhabhi	Marathi		
2018	Date with Saie	Herself	Marathi		
2019	Girlfriend	Alisha Nerurkar/Payal Mehta	Marathi		
2019	Kulkarni Chaukatla Deshpande	Jaya	Marathi		
2020	Dhurala	Harshada Navnath Ubhe	Marathi		
2020	Cookie	Inspector Babar	Marathi		
2021	Medium Spicy	Chef K. R. Gowri	Marathi		
2021	Colorphool	Meera	Marathi		
2021	Mimi	Shama	Hindi		
2022	Pondicherry	Nikita	Marathi		
2022	India Lockdown	Phoolmati	Hindi		
2023	Satarcha Salman		Marathi	Special appearance	
2024	Sridevi Prasanna	Sridevi	Marathi		
2024	Bhakshak	SSP Jasmeet Kaur	Hindi	Netflix Original	
2024	Agni	Rukmini "Ruku" Surve	Hindi	Amazon Original	
2025	Ground Zero	Jaya Dubey	Hindi		
2025	Devmanus	—	Marathi	Special appearance in the song "Aalech Mi"	
2025	Gulkand	Neeta Dhawale	Marathi		
2026	Tumbadchi Manjula	Shobha	Marathi		
2026	Bol Bol Rani	Maya	Marathi		
2026	Adkitta	Mangal	Marathi	Zee5 Original	

=== Television ===
Year	Title	Role	Channel	Notes	Ref.
2003	Tuzyavina	Sana	Zee Marathi		
2004–2005	Misha	Mugdha	Zee Marathi		
2006	Hya Gojirvanya Gharat	Madhura Paranjpe	ETV Marathi		
2006	Agnishikha		ETV Marathi		
2007	Kasturi	Navneet	Star Plus		
2007	Anubandh	Ashwini	Zee Marathi		
2011	Fu Bai Fu	Host	Zee Marathi		
2018–present	Maharashtrachi Hasyajatra	Judge	Sony Marathi		

=== Web series ===
Year	Title	Role	Platform	Language	Notes	Ref.
2017	YOLO: You Only Live Once	Inspector	SonyLIV	Marathi	Special appearance	
2021	Samantar 2	Meera / Sundara	MX Player	Marathi		
2021	Navarasa	Malli	Netflix	Tamil	In the Edhiri segment	
2022	Pet Puraan	Aditi	SonyLIV	Marathi		
2022	B.E.Rojgaar	Piyu	YouTube	Marathi		
2024	Manvat Murders	Samindri	SonyLIV	Marathi		
2025	The Secret of the Shiledars	Priyal Deshpande	Disney+ Hotstar	Hindi		
2025	Crime Beat	Archana Pandey	ZEE5	Hindi		
2025	Dabba Cartel	SI Preeti	Netflix	Hindi		
2025	Bindiya Ke Bahubali	Ajji Davan	MX Player	Hindi		
2026	Matka King	Barkha Bhatti	Amazon Prime Video	Hindi		
