= List of awards and nominations received by Sai Tamhankar =

Sai Tamhankar awards and nominations
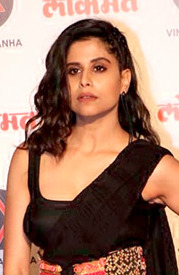
- Tamhankar in 2018
Awards and nominations
Award	Wins	Nominations

Totals (Note: Certain award groups do not simply award one winner. They acknowledge several different recipients, have runners-up, and have third place. Since this is a specific recognition and is different from losing an award, runner-up mentions are considered wins in this award tally. For simplification and to avoid errors, each award in this list has been presumed to have had a prior nomination.)
- Wins: 19
- Nominations: 41

Sai Tamhankar is an Indian actress who has appeared in Marathi and Hindi films and television. She has received several awards and nominations including a Maharashtra State Film Award, a Filmfare Award, three Filmfare Awards Marathi, an IIFA Award, eight Maharashtracha Favourite Kon and two Zee Chitra Gaurav Puraskar.

== Fakt Marathi Cine Sanman ==
The Fakt Marathi Cine Sanman are annual awards presented by the Fakt Marathi television network to honour both artistic and technical excellence in the Marathi-language film industry of India.

Year	Nominated work	Category	Result	Ref.
2022	Pondicherry	Best Actress in a Lead Role	Nominated	

== Filmfare Awards ==
The Filmfare Awards are annual awards that honour artistic and technical excellence in the Hindi-language film industry of India.

Year	Nominated work	Category	Result	Ref.
2022	Mimi	Best Supporting Actress	Won	

== Filmfare Awards Marathi ==
The Filmfare Marathi Awards are presented annually to both artistic and technical excellence of professionals in the Marathi film industry of India.

Year	Nominated work	Category	Result	Ref.
2015	Classmates	Best Supporting Actress	Nominated	
2016	Family Katta	Best Supporting Actress	Won	
2016	Vazandar	Best Actress	Nominated	
2021	Dhurala (tied with Neha Pendse for June)	Best Actress	Won	
2022	Pondicherry	Best Actress	Nominated	
2022	Pondicherry	Best Actress Critics	Won	
2025	Sridevi Prasanna	Best Actress	Nominated	
2026	Gulkand	Best Actress	Nominated	

== IIFA Awards ==
The International Indian Film Academy Awards, is an annual awards ceremony for Bollywood. Produced by Wizcraft International Entertainment Pvt. Ltd, the winners of the awards are decided by fans, who vote online for their favourite actors from the Hindi film industry.

Year	Nominated work	Category	Result	Ref.
2022	Mimi	Best Supporting Actress	Won	

== Lokmat Stylish Awards ==
Lokmat Stylish Awards are Indian awards presented by Lokmat to acknowledge the style statement of leaders in their respective fields including politics, business, sports, lifestyle, and the entertainment industry

Year	Nominated work	Category	Result	Ref.
2017	—N/a	Most Stylish Diva	Won	
2021	—N/a	Contribution to Regional Cinema	Won	

== Maharashtra State Film Awards ==
Maharashtra State Film Awards, one of the prestigious awards of Marathi cinema, are awarded by the Government of Maharashtra to Marathi language films and artists.

Year	Nominated work	Role	Category	Result	Ref.
2014	Duniyadari	Shirin Ghatge	Best Supporting Actress	Won	
2025	Pondicherry	Nikita	Best Actress	Won	

== Maharashtracha Favourite Kon? ==
The Maharashtracha Favourite Kon? Awards are presented by the Marathi television channel Zee Talkies to honour excellence in Marathi cinema.

Year	Nominated work	Category	Result	Ref.
2009	Sanai Choughade	Favourite Actress	Nominated	
2009	—N/a	Popular Face of the Year	Won	
2012	—N/a	Popular Face of the Year	Nominated	
2012	Zhakaas	Favourite Supporting Actress	Nominated	
2013	Duniyadari	Favourite Actress	Won	
2013	Balak Palak	Favourite Supporting Actress	Nominated	
2013	—N/a	Popular Face of the Year	Won	
2014	Sau Shashi Deodhar	Favourite Actress	Nominated	
2015	Pyaar Vali Love Story	Favourite Actress	Nominated	
2015	Classmates	Favourite Supporting Actress	Won	
2015	—N/a	Popular Face of the Year	Nominated	
2016	—N/a	Popular Face of the Year	Nominated	
2017	Jaundya Na Balasaheb	Favourite Actress	Won	
2017	Family Katta	Favourite Supporting Actress	Nominated	
2017	—N/a	Popular Face of the Year	Won	
2018	—N/a	Popular Face of the Year	Nominated	
2019	—N/a	Popular Face of the Year	Nominated	
2021	Duniyadari	Favourite Actress	Nominated	
2021	Jaundya Na Balasaheb	Favourite Actress	Nominated	
2021	Classmates	Favourite Supporting Actress	Won	
2021	—N/a	Popular Face of the Year	Nominated	
2022	—N/a	Popular Face of the Year	Nominated	
2022	—N/a	Favourite Suvarnavati	Won	
2023	—N/a	Popular Face of the Year	Nominated	

== Zee Chitra Gaurav Puraskar ==
Zee Chitra Gaurav Puraskar are annual awards presented by the Zee Marathi television network to honor both artistic and technical excellence in the Marathi-language film industry of India.

Year	Nominated work	Category	Result	Ref.
2014	Duniyadari	Best Actress	Won	
2015	Sau Shashi Deodhar	Best Actress	Nominated	
2015	Classmates	Most Natural Performance of the Year	Won	
2015	Classmates	Best Supporting Actress	Nominated	
2020	Girlfriend	Best Actress	Nominated	
2026	Gulkand	Best Actress	Nominated	

== Other awards ==
Year	Award	Nominated work	Category	Result	Ref.
2022	Indian Television Academy Awards	Mimi	Best Supporting Actress in an Original Film	Nominated	
2025	Maharashtra Times Sanman Awards	Yearly Contribution	Achiever of the Year	Won	
2026	Sanskrutik Kaladarpan	Gulkand	Best Actress	Nominated	
2026	Indian National Cine Academy Awards	Gulkand	Best Actress (Marathi)	Nominated	
