= MFK Award for Favourite Actress =

Indian film award

Maharashtracha Favourite Kon? for Favourite Actress
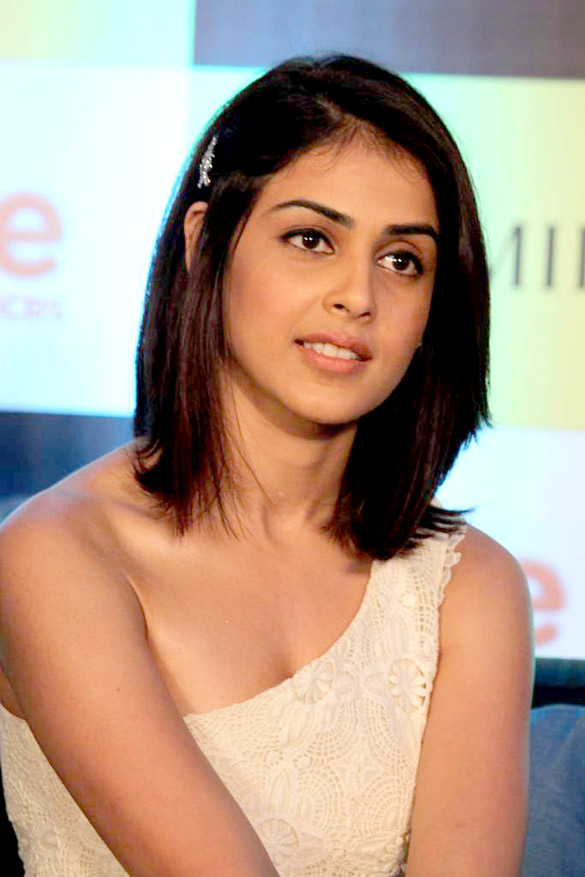
- The 2022 recipient: Genelia Deshmukh for Ved
- Awarded for: Best Performance by an Actress in a Leading Role
- Country: India
- Presented by: Zee Talkies
- First award: Supriya Pilgaonkar, Amhi Satpute (2009)
- Currently held by: Genelia Deshmukh, Ved (2023)

Maharashtracha Favourite Kon? Award for Favourite Actress is given by Zee Talkies as part of its annual Maharashtracha Favourite Kon? ceremony for Marathi films. The award was first given in 2009 for the films released in 2008.

== Superlatives ==
Superlatives	Actor	Record
Actress with most awards	Sonalee Kulkarni; Sai Tamhankar; Amruta Khanvilkar; Rinku Rajguru	2
Actress with most nominations	Mukta Barve	8
Actress with most nominations in a single year	Priya Bapat (2015)	2
Actress with most consecutive year nominations	Mukta Barve (2014-2017)	4
Actress with most nominations without ever winning	Priya Bapat Mrumnayee Deshpande	4
Eldest winner	Madhuri Dixit (2018)	51
Eldest nominee	Tanuja (2014)	71
Youngest winner	Rinku Rajguru (2016)	15
Youngest nominee	Rinku Rajguru (2016)	15

- With two wins each, Sai Tamhankar, Sonalee Kulkarni, Rinku Rajguru and Amruta Khanvilkar have the most awards.
- Sai Tamhankar is the overall most nominated performers in the female acting categories, each with overall 24 nominations, followed by Amruta Khanvilkar with 16, and Sonalee Kulkarni with 14 nominations each.
- Tamhankar has 7 nominations for Favourite Actress, five for Favourite Supporting Actress, and eleven for Popular Face of the Year, while Khanvilkar has 6 nominations for Favourite Actress, one for Favourite Supporting Actress, and nine for Popular Face of the Year, and Kulkarni has 6 nominations for Favourite Actress and eight for Popular Face of the Year.
- Mukta Barve holds the record for the maximum Favourite Actress nominations with 8, followed by Tamhankar with 7, Khanvilkar and Kulkarni with 6 nominations each, and Priya Bapat and Mrunmayee Deshpande with 4 nominations each. Barve also holds the record for most consecutive nominations with 4 between 2014 and 2017.
- Supriya Pilgoankar, Medha Manjrekar, Pallavi Joshi, Urmilla Kothare, Mukta Barve, Amruta Khanvilkar, Mrunmayee Deshpande, Vandana Gupte and Sukanya Kulkarni each received nominations in both categories the Favourite Actress and Favourite Supporting Actress. Sai Tamhankar is the only actress who won this both Awards.
- On five occasions, actresses were nominated for both these awards in the same year: Sai Tamhankar in 2013 (for Duniyadari and Balak Palak), 2015 (for Classmates and Pyaar Vali Love Story), 2017 (for Jaundya Na Balasaheb and Family Katta), Mrunmayee Deshpande in 2016 (for Katyar Kaljat Ghusali and Natsamrat), and Amruta Khanvilkar in 2022 (for Chandramukhi and Har Har Mahadev).
- Priya Bapat and Mrunmayee Deshpande holds the record of maximum nominations without ever winning, with four, followed by Sonali Kulkarni with three nominations.
- Madhuri Dixit, who won the award in 2018 at the age of 51 for Bucket List, is the eldest winner, while Tanuja became the eldest nominee in 2014 at the age of 71 for Pitruroon. Rinku Rajguru, in 2016, became the youngest winner and youngest nominee at the age of 15 for Sairat. Rajguru also became the only actress to win Favourite Female Debut and Favourite Actress for the same film.

== Winners and nominees ==
Year	Photos of winners	Actor	Role(s)	Film	Ref.
2009		Supriya Pilgaonkar †	Annapurna (Purna) Satpute	Amhi Satpute	
2009		Madhura Velankar	Priti	Uladhaal	
2009		Medha Manjrekar	Sumati Jadhav	De Dhakka	
2009		Ketaki Thatte	Gauri	Galgale Nighale	
2009		Sai Tamhankar	Saee	Sanai Choughade	
2010		Sonalee Kulkarni †	Nayana Kolhapurkarin	Natarang	
2010		Amruta Khanvilkar	Neha	Gaiir	
2010		Pallavi Joshi	Rita	Rita	
2010		Girija Oak	Vasanti	Huppa Huiyya	
2011		Tejaswini Pandit †	Sindhutai Sapkal	Mee Sindhutai Sapkal	
2011		Urmilla Kothare	Yashoda	Mala Aai Vhhaychy!	
2011		Amruta Khanvilkar	Anushka	Arjun	
2011		Mukta Barve	Gauri	Mumbai-Pune-Mumbai	
2011		Madhura Velankar	Ankita & Amruta	Haapus	
2012		Amruta Khanvilkar †	Manjula	Zhakaas	
2012		Priya Bapat	Uma Damle	Kaksparsh	
2012		Radhika Apte	Aawalibai	Tukaram	
2012		Bhargavi Chirmule	Suman	One Room Kitchen	
2012		Mukta Barve	Pencil	Badam Rani Gulam Chor	
2013		Sai Tamhankar †	Shirin Ghatge	Duniyadari	
2013		Shriya Pilgaonkar	Swara Deshpande	Ekulti Ek	
2013		Priya Bapat	Amruta Deshpande	Time Please	
2013		Mrunmayee Deshpande	Kusum	Mokala Shwaas	
2013		Kranti Redkar	Kajal	No Entry Pudhe Dhoka Aahey	
2014		Ketaki Mategaonkar †	Prajakta Lele	Timepass	
2014		Mukta Barve	Aarti Pathak	Mangalashtak Once More	
2014		Tanuja	Bhagirathi	Pitruroon	
2014		Sai Tamhankar	Shubhada	Sau Shashi Deodhar	
2014		Urmila Matondkar	Purva	Ajoba	
2014		Radhika Apte	Kavita	Lai Bhaari	
2015		Mukta Barve †	Manjiri Naik	Double Seat	
2015		Priya Bapat	Prajakta Lele	Timepass 2	
2015		Priya Bapat	Janaki	Happy Journey	
2015		Sai Tamhankar	Alia	Pyaar Vali Love Story	
2015		Sonali Kulkarni	Mandakini Amte	Dr. Prakash Baba Amte – The Real Hero	
2015		Amruta Subhash	Aruna Kale	Killa	
2016		Rinku Rajguru †	Archana (Archie) Patil	Sairat	
2016		Amruta Khanvilkar	Zareena	Katyar Kaljat Ghusali	
2016		Mrunmayee Deshpande	Uma	Katyar Kaljat Ghusali	
2016		Mukta Barve	Gauri Pradhan	Mumbai-Pune-Mumbai 2	
2016		Medha Manjrekar	Kaveri Belvalkar	Natsamrat	
2016		Sonalee Kulkarni	Rupali Thorat	Poshter Girl	
2017		Sai Tamhankar †	Karishma	Jaundya Na Balasaheb	
2017		Mithila Palkar	Indu	Muramba	
2017		Mrinmayee Godbole	Savitri	Chi Va Chi Sau Ka	
2017		Sonali Kulkarni	Shaila Katdare	Kachcha Limboo	
2017		Mukta Barve	Samaira Joshi	Hrudayantar	
2017		Parna Pethe	Aboli	Faster Fene	
2018		Madhuri Dixit †	Madhura Sane	Bucket List	
2018		Sonali Kulkarni	Radha Agarkar	Gulabjaam	
2018		Devika Daftardar	Chaitya's mother	Naal	
2018		Tejaswini Pandit	Bubli	Ye Re Ye Re Paisa	
2018		Mrunmayee Deshpande	Kesar	Farzand	
2018		Kalyani Muley	Yamuna	Nude	
2019		Sonalee Kulkarni †	Hirkani	Hirkani	
2019		Mukta Barve	Madhavi Sawant	Bandishala	
2019		Shivani Surve	Meera	Triple Seat	
2019		Mrunmayee Deshpande	Kesar	Fatteshikast	
2019		Ritika Shrotri	Meenakshi	Takatak	
2019		Bhagyashree Milind	Anandi Joshi	Anandi Gopal	
2021		Rinku Rajguru †	Archana (Archie) Patil	Sairat	
2021		Sonalee Kulkarni	Nayana Kolhapurkarin	Natarang	
2021		Sonalee Kulkarni	Hirkani	Hirkani	
2021		Sai Tamhankar	Shirin Ghatge	Duniyadari	
2021		Sai Tamhankar	Karishma	Jaundya Na Balasaheb	
2021		Amruta Khanvilkar	Manjula	Zhakaas	
2021		Ketaki Mategaonkar	Prajakta Lele	Timepass	
2021		Tejaswini Pandit	Sindhutai Sapkal	Mee Sindhutai Sapkal	
2021		Mukta Barve	Manjiri Naik	Double Seat	
2021		Madhuri Dixit	Madhura Sane	Bucket List	
2022		Amruta Khanvilkar †	Chandramukhi (Chandra) Junnarkar	Chandramukhi	
2022		Hruta Durgule	Ananya Deshmukh	Ananya	
2022		Vaidehi Parashurami	Seema Joshi	Zombivli	
2022		Sonalee Kulkarni	Shefali	Tamasha Live	
2022		Ritika Shrotri	Babli	Darling	
2023		Genelia Deshmukh	Shravani Jadhav	Ved	
2023		Rohini Hattangadi, Vandana Gupte, Sukanya Kulkarni, Shilpa Navalkar, Suchitra Bandekar, Deepa Parab	Jaya, Shashi, Sadhana, Ketaki Patil, Pallavi, Charu Deshmukh	Baipan Bhari Deva	
2023		Suhas Joshi, Nirmiti Sawant, Kshitee Jog, Suchitra Bandekar, Sayali Sanjeev, Shivani Surve, Rinku Rajguru	Indumati Karnik, Nirmala Konde-Patil, Meeta Jahagirdar, Vaishali Deshpande, Krutika Joshi, Manali, Taniya Konde-Patil	Jhimma 2	
2023		Shivani Surve	Dr. Devika	Vaalvi	
