= Tu Hi Re =

- Theatrical Release Poster
- Directed by: Sanjay Jadhav
- Screenplay by: Sanjay Jadhav
- Story by: Manaswini Lata Ravindra
- Produced by: Mrudula Padval Oza; Sheetal Manere; Utpal Acharya; Ashish Wagh; Deepak Pandurang Rane
- Starring: Swwapnil Joshi; Sai Tamhankar; Tejaswini Pandit
- Cinematography: Prasad Bhende
- Edited by: Apurva Motiwale; Ashish Mhatre
- Music by: Amitraj; Pankaj Padghan; Shashank Powar
- Production companies: Karan Entertainment; Indian Film Studios; Dreaming Twenty Four Seven Entertainment
- Release date: 4 September 2015
- Country: India
- Language: Marathi
- Budget: 3.5 crore
- Box office: ₹6.51 crore (US$680,000)(3rd Weekend)

Tu Hi Re is a 2015 romantic drama Marathi language film directed by Sanjay Jadhav and stars Swwapnil Joshi, Sai Tamhankar and Tejaswini Pandit in the leading roles. This is the third film by trio of Sanjay Jadhav, Swwapnil Joshi and Sai Tamhankar after Duniyadari and Pyaar Vali Love Story. It is an official remake of the 2006 Tamil film Sillunu Oru Kaadhal starring Jyothika, Suriya and Bhumika.

For this movie Sai Tamhankar and Tejaswini Pandit have first time recorded a song as a playback singers. For the promotion of the movie Tu Hi Re Swwapnil Joshi, Sai Tamhankar and Tejaswini Pandit have appeared in Popular Marathi TV series Dil Dosti Duniyadari.

== Plot ==
Nandini (Sai Tamhankar) is someone who is a staunch believer in love marriages but following her father's orders, she marries Siddharth (Swwapnil Joshi) who is coping with heartbreak. Eight years later, Siddharth and Nandini are leading happy lives in Mumbai with their daughter. Kamlakar Bhanushali (Girish Oak), a politician who has some connection with Siddharth's past, comes to Siddharth's workplace and makes a proposal to him. He tells Siddharth that he's ready to fund Siddharth's work plant with Rs 25 crore provided he gets rid of Nandini. Turns out, Siddharth used to be in a relationship with Bhanushali's daughter Bhairavi (Tejaswini Pandit). How this situation resolves forms the crux of the story.

== Cast ==
- Swapnil Joshi as Siddharth
- Sai Tamhankar as Nandini
- Tejaswini Pandit as Bhairavi Bhanushali
- Girish Oak as MP Kamlakar Bhanushali, Bhairavi's father
- Sushant Shelar as Prasad

== Soundtrack ==
Tu Hi Re

Soundtrack album by Amitraj, Pankaj Padghan and Shashank Powar
- Released: 17 July 2015
- Genre: Film soundtrack
- Length: 22:57
- Label: Video Palace

Amitraj, Pankaj Padghan and Shashank Powar chronology
Classmates (2015)	Tu Hi Re (2015)

Guru Thakur, Mandar Cholkar and Kunthinath Karke wrote lyrics for the film's soundtrack. Amitraj, Pankaj Padghan and Shashank Powar composed the score.

=== Track listing ===
Tu Hi Re
No.	Title	Singer(s)	Length
1.	"Gulabachi Kali"	Vaishali Samant, Urmila Dhangar, Amitraj	4:11
2.	"Sundara"	Adarsh Shinde	3:21
3.	"Tola Tola"	Amitraj, Bela Shende	3:28
4.	"Nako Nako Na Re"	Sayali Pankaj	3:26
5.	"Jeev Ha Sang Na"	Adarsh Shinde	4:25
6.	"Tola Tola (Unplugged)"	Sai Tamhankar, Tejaswini Pandit	4:06
Total length:			22:57

== Reception ==
The film has received positive reviews. Pune Mirror, the Times Of India, and the Maharashtra Times have all given the film a 3-star review.
