= Pallavi Patil =

Indian actress

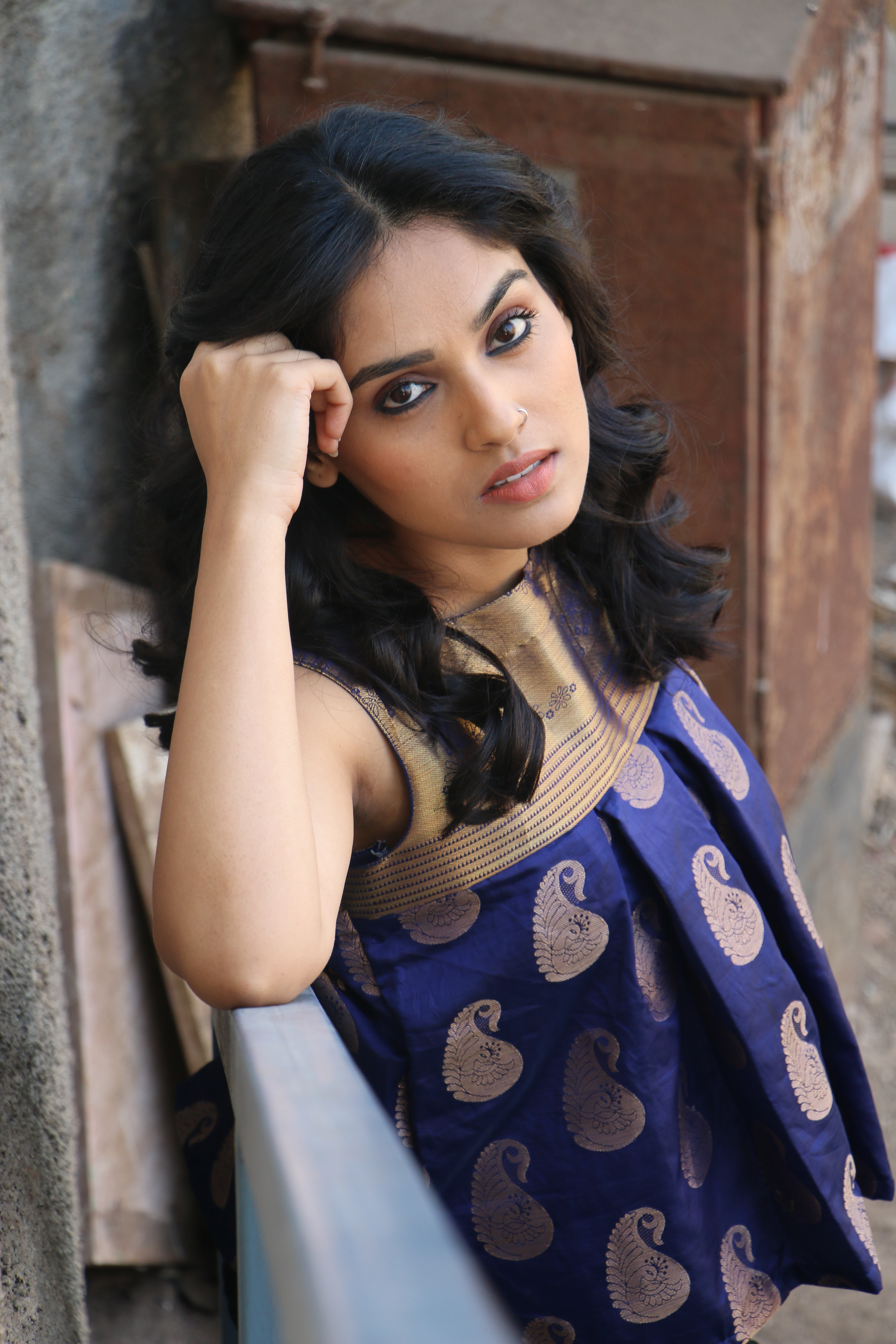
- Born: 4 November; Dhule, Maharashtra, India
- Occupation: Actress
- Years active: 2015–present
- Parent(s): Yashwantrao Bhimrao Patil, Surekha Yashwantrao Patil

Pallavi Patil is an Indian actress. She debuted with the Marathi film Classmates, Patil has starred in several Marathi films including 702 Dixit's, Shentimental, and Tu Tithe Asave and John Abraham's Marathi film production Savita Damodar Paranjpe.

== Early life ==
Patil was born on 4 November in Dhule, Maharashtra and brought up in Jalgaon. She completed schooling from Sarvoday Madhyamik Vidyalaya, Ghude near Bhadgaon and has a degree from D.Y. Patil College of Architecture, Pune.

== Career ==
Patil participated in a beauty pageant organized by 9X Jhakaas channel. Patil was the runner-up and consequentially landed the role of 'Heena' in Aditya Sarpotdar's multi-starrer Classmates alongside Ankush Chaudhari, Sai Tamhankar, and Sonalee Kulkarni. Her performance in Classmates landed here a role in Director Shankh Rajadhyaksha's Marathi suspense thriller 702 Dixits. Patil has also appeared in Abhinay Deo's Hindi TV series 24, starring Anil Kapoor, where she portrayed the character of Mitali. In 2017, Pallavi starred alongside Ashok Saraf, Raghubir Yadav and Pushkar Shrotri in the Marathi comedy film Shentimental.

== Filmography ==
=== Films ===
Year	Film	Role	Ref(s)
2015	Classmates	Heena	
2016	702 Dixits	Riya	
2017	Shentimental	Sunanda	
2018	Savita Damodar Paranjpe	Neetu	
2018	Boyz 2	Devika	
2018	Tu Tithe Asave	Gauri	
2019	Triple Seat	Vrunda	
2021	Basta	Vidya	
2021	Grey	Gayatri	
TBA	Chakravyuh		

=== Television ===
Year	Show	Role	Channel	Ref.
2016	24	Mitali	Colors TV	
2017	Prem He	Pallavi	Zee Yuva	
2020	Jigarbaaz	Dr.Suhani	Sony Marathi	
2022-2023	Nava Gadi Nava Rajya	Anandi Parab Karnik	Zee Marathi	

=== Web series ===
Year	Title	Role	Platform	Notes
2019	Gondya Ala Re	Durgabai	ZEE5	
