= Riya Sisodiya =

Indian actress and model

- Born: 7 October 1995 (age 30)
- Occupations: Actress, Model
- Years active: 2015–present
- Known for: Love Sonia

Riya Sisodiya is an Indian actress and model who appeared in Tabrez Noorani and David Womark's 2018 film Love Sonia. In February 2022, she further gained popularity from a Wild Stone advertisement, due to the modern rendition of the Punjabi folk song "Nasha" playing in the background, which is sung by Amir Jalal and Faridkot.

== Filmography ==
Year	Title	Role	Language
2018	Love Sonia	Preeti	Hindi
2022	Wild Stone Classic Deos for Men - Log Toh Notice Karenge!	Customer	Hindi, Punjabi
