= Savita Damodar Paranjpe =

2018 Indian film by Swapna Waghmare Joshi

- Theatrical release poster
- Directed by: Swapna Waghmare Joshi
- Written by: Shekhar Tamhane
- Screenplay by: Shirish Latkar
- Story by: Shekhar Tamhane
- Based on: Savita Damodar Paranjpe (play) by Shekhar Tamhane
- Produced by: John Abraham
- Starring: Subodh Bhave; Trupti Toradmal; Pallavi Patil; Rakesh Bapat
- Cinematography: Prasad Bhande
- Edited by: Kshitija Khandagale
- Music by: Nilesh Moharir; Amitraj
- Production company: JA Entertainment
- Distributed by: Panorama Studios
- Release date: 31 August 2018 (India)
- Running time: 1h 48min
- Country: India
- Language: Marathi

Savita Damodar Paranjpe is a 2018 Marathi film directed by Swapna Waghmare Joshi and produced by John Abraham. The film is based on Shekhar Tamhane's play of the same name, which starred Reema Lagoo.

== Synopsis ==
After 8 years of marriage, the life of a married couple turns upside down when the wife begins to exhibit alarming behaviour. Her husband tries to find out whether she suffers from a personality disorder or something more sinister.

Sharad and Kussum Abhyankar are a loving couple married for 8 years, and both partners are successful. However, the couple has been childless and Kussum has been complaining of excruciating stomachaches from time to time for the past 8 years.

Eventually, Sharad discovers that Kussum is being possessed by the spectre of Savita Damodar Paranjpe. Flashbacks reveal that Sharad and Savita were great friends. Savita used to flirt with Sharad, but he didn't take it seriously. Sharad fell in love with Savita's best friend Kussum and their parents consented to the marriage. Savita was unable to accept this turn of events and her love for Sharad transformed into an obsession. Sharad vehemently spurned Savita's advances and she immolated herself. Sharad silently blamed himself for Savita's death and since then, remained slightly distant from Kussum, leaving her sexually frustrated.

It is revealed that Kussum's miscarriages are caused by Savita. While possessing Kussum, Savita expressed her desire to sleep with Sharad's friend, Ashok, to sow discord in Sharad's marriage. Kussum, Ashok, and Sharad oppose this. Devastated on learning the whole truth, Kussum decides to immolate herself to end the misery. However, Sharad prevents her and tells Savita that although he acknowledges her love, she must respect his marriage to Kussum. Savita leaves Kussum and everyone rejoices. However, Sharad is suspicious that Savita would give up so easily. The movie ends with Sharad discovering that Savita has possessed his younger sister Neetu, and his troubles are far from over.

== Cast ==
- Subodh Bhave as Sharad Abhyankar
- Trupti Toradmal as Kussum Abhyankar
- Raqesh Bapat as Ashok
- Pallavi Patil as Neetu
- Savita Prabhune as Kusum's Mother
- Angad Mhaskar as Dr. Agnihotri
- Hemangi Kavi as Savita Damodar Paranjpe

== Soundtrack ==
Savita Damodar Parajpe

Soundtrack album by Nilesh Moharir and Amitraj
- Released: 10 August 2018
- Recorded: 2017–18
- Genre: Feature film soundtrack
- Length: 26:46
- Language: Marathi
- Label: T-Series
External audio
- Official Audio Jukebox on YouTube

The movie soundtrack had 5 songs and was released by T-Series on 10 August 2018. Music was produced by Nilesh Moharir and Amitraj. Lyrics were penned by Vaibhav Joshi, Mandar Cholkar and sung by Swapnil Bandodkar, Nishaa Upadhyaya Kapadia, Adarsh Shinde, and Jaanvee Prabhu-Arora.

Track listing
No.	Title	Lyrics	Music	Singer(s)	Length
1.	"Jaadugari"	Vaibhav Joshi	Nilesh Moharir	Swapnil Bandodkar	4:16
2.	"Shri Swami Samarth"	Vaibhav Joshi	Amitraj	Adarsh Shinde, Swapnil Bandodkar	5:30
3.	"Kiti Sawarava"	Mandar Cholkar	Amitraj	Adarsh Shinde, Janvee Prabhu Arora	4:29
4.	"Velhala"	Vaibhav Joshi	Nilesh Moharir	Nishaa Upadhyay Kapadia, Swapnil Bandodkar	6:16
5.	"Velhala" (Male Version)	Vaibhav Joshi	Nilesh Moharir	Swapnil Bandodkar	6:15
Total length:					26:46

== Reception ==
=== Critical reception ===
Mihir Bhanage, writing for The Times of India, Concluded that the movie succeeded in keeping the thrill intact, praising the movie primarily for the interesting story and performances. Keyur Seta of Cinestaan praised the story but criticised the execution, saying "acting Subodh Bhave and Trupti Toradmal does not do justice to its interesting story". Another review from CineCelluloid said that "while the first half of the film was very interesting and engaging, the second half becomes a little dull with early revelation of most of the suspense elements".
