= Vivek Kajaria =

Indian film producer and director

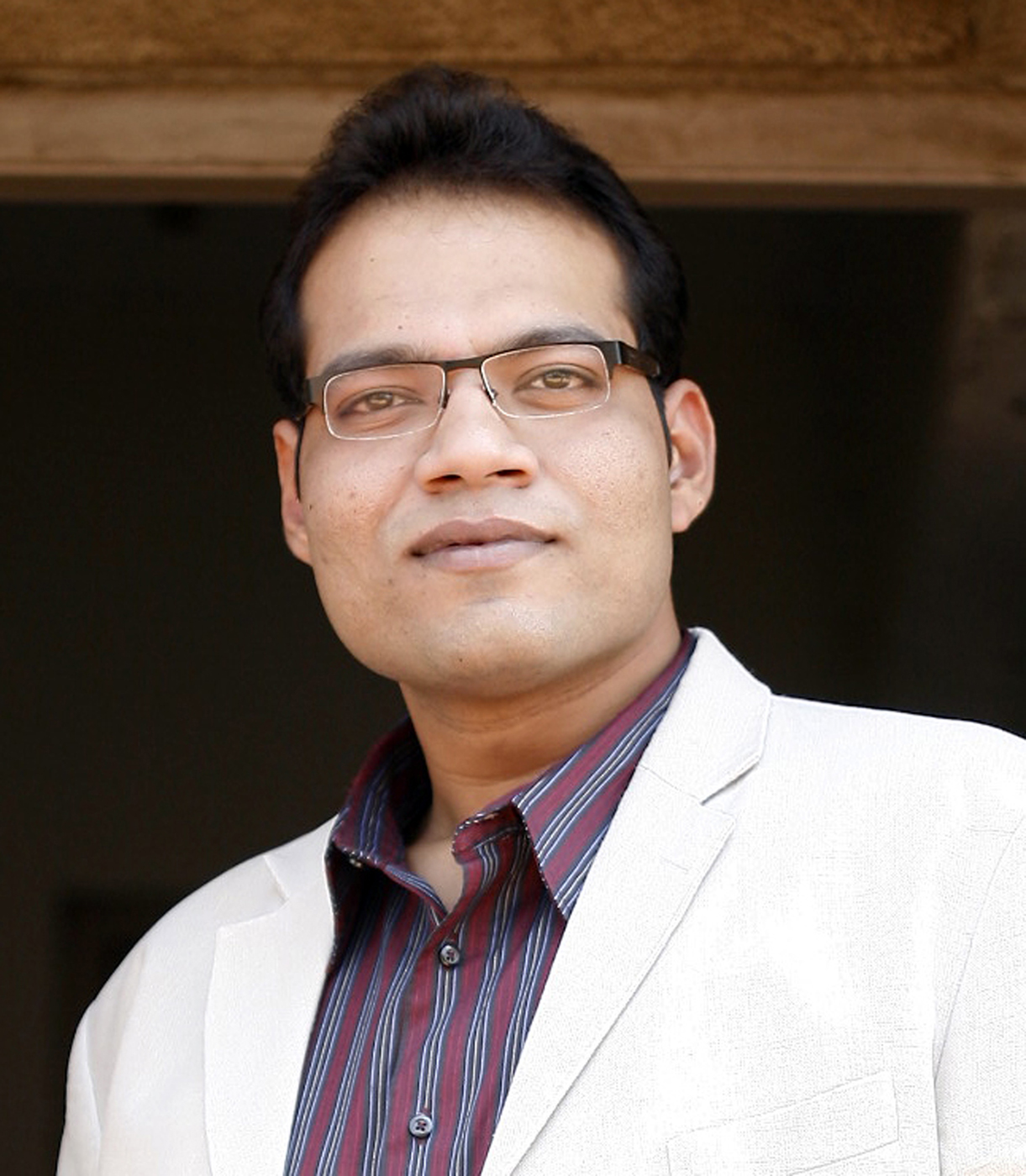
- Occupation: Film producer

Vivek Kajaria (Hindi: विवेक कजारिया), is an Indian film producer and director. He is the founder and managing director of Holy Basil Productions Pvt. Ltd. and a co-founder/partner of NAHB, a joint venture between Holy Basil Productions and Navalakha Arts.

== Early life and education ==
Vivek Kajaria has an MBA, as well as a M.Sc. degree in Computer Science and Applications from Warwick University, UK. He joined his family business of construction and development, subsequently founding the production company Holy Basil Productions.

== Career ==
Kajaria has produced feature films including Shala, Anumati (Presenter), and Fandry.

He directed the short film Durga which was screened at 20 film festivals internationally.

He has also played an active role in fund raising activities for the Mumbai Film Festival, and founded Basil Content Media Pvt Ltd as a film sales and film festival strategies outfit.

== Filmography ==
- Fandry (2013)
- Anumati (2013)
- Siddhant
- Chaurya
- Durga (Short film)
- Rakshas (2018)
