= Esha Dey =

Indian actress, television presenter, and Kathak dancer

- Born: Esha Wadnerkar; 25 May
- Education: Bharati Vidyapeeth; London School of Dramatic Art
- Occupations: Actress; Kathak dancer
- Years active: 2011–present
- Known for: Maharashtrachi Hasyajatra
- Spouse: Abhishek Khankar (m. 2026)

Esha Wadnerkar, professionally known as Esha Dey is an Indian actress, performer, prominently works in Marathi theatre, films, web series, and TV serials. She is known for Marathi television show Maharashtrachi Hasyajatra.

== Career ==
Dey began her professional career in 2011 as a theatre artist and subsequently expanded into working across various mediums including films, web-series and television. She has completed M.A in Kathak dance from Bharati Vidyapeeth Pune and in acting from the London School of Dramatic Art. After finishing her course in London and returning to India, the COVID-19 lockdown began. During this time, actor Sameer Khandekar invited her to create a video for his YouTube channel 'Asowa,' to which she agreed. The video garnered a positive reaction, prompting her to opt for Maharashtrachi Hasyajatra over Vishakha Subhedar.

She has participated in numerous projects under "BhaDiPa" and is also represented by the company "BhaDiPa". In 2024, Esha shared the screen with Ranveer Singh for a Dalmia cement commercial. The following year she acted in Gulkand which emerged as fourth highest Marathi film of 2025.

== Filmography ==
=== Film ===
| Year | Film | Role | Language | Notes |
|---|---|---|---|---|
| 2012 | Aiyyaa | Anju | Hindi | |
| 2024 | Nach Ga Ghuma | | Marathi | Guest appearance |
| 2025 | Gulkand | Ragini Mane | Marathi | |
| 2026 | Bharat Bhhagya Viddhaata | Babita Adsule | Hindi | |

=== Television ===
| Title | Role | Language | Notes |
|---|---|---|---|
| Chukbhul Dyavi Ghyavi | Bandi | Marathi | |
| Sukhi Mansacha Sadara | | Marathi | |
| Maharashtrachi Hasyajatra | Contestant | Marathi | |
| 9 To 5 | Devika | Marathi | TV Mini Series |

=== Web series ===
| Title | Language | Ref. |
|---|---|---|
| Aashram | Hindi | |

== Personal life ==
Esha's real surname is Wadnerkar but when she studied at the London School of Drama, her journey included navigating name pronunciation challenges during auditions, prompting her professional adoption of the name Esha Dey.

She married Abhishek Khankar on 11 March 2026.
