= Filmfare Award for Best Actress – Marathi =

Indian award for Marathi language films

Filmfare Marathi Awards for Best Actress
- Awarded for: Best Performance by an Actress in a Leading Role
- Country: India
- Presented by: Filmfare
- First award: Sandhya Shantaram, Pinjara (1973)
- Currently held by: Amruta Subhash, Jarann & Hruta Durgule, Aarpar (2025)
- Website: Filmfare Awards

The Filmfare Marathi Award for Best Actress is presented annually at the Filmfare Awards to an actor via a public vote or jury; it is given by Filmfare for Marathi films. Each individual entry shows the title, followed by the production company and the producer. The award was first given in 1974.

== Superlatives ==
Superlative	Actor	Record
Actress with most awards	Sonali Kulkarni	3
Actress with most nominations	Sonali Kulkarni	6
Actress with most nominations	Mukta Barve	6
Actress with most nominations in a single year	Mukta Barve (2015)	2
Actress with most nominations without ever winning	Sonalee Kulkarni	5
Eldest winner	Suhas Joshi (1998)	51
Eldest nominee	Vandana Gupte (2016)	71
Youngest winner	Rinku Rajguru (2016)	15
Youngest nominee	Rinku Rajguru (2016)	15
Youngest nominee	Anaya Phatak (2021)	15

- Sonali Kulkarni holds the record for the most wins in the category, having received the Best Actress award three times from a total of six nominations—the highest number of nominations alongside Mukta Barve, who has won the award twice. Other actresses to have won the award twice include Sandhya Shantaram, Usha Chavan, Smita Patil, Ranjana Deshmukh, and Sukanya Kulkarni.
- Notably, Sukanya Kulkarni is the only actress to have maintained a perfect record, winning the award for both of her nominations in 1994 and 1997. Additionally, she (in 1997) and Mukta Barve (in 2015) are the only actresses to have received two nominations in the same year.
- Sayali Sanjeev received three consecutive nominations from 2020 to 2022, ultimately winning in the final year. Several other actresses have been nominated in two consecutive years, including Neena Kulkarni (1994–1995), Priya Bapat (2016–2017), Sai Tamhankar (2021–2022), Priyadarshini Indalkar (2023–2024) and Sai Tamhankar (2024–2025). Among them, Tamhankar has garnered five nominations and one win, while Sonalee Kulkarni has been nominated five times, including four consecutive years, without securing a win.
- Priya Bapat has earned three nominations, and Veena Jamkar, Neena Kulkarni, Vandana Gupte, Alka Kubal and Priyadarshini Indalkar have each been nominated twice.
- Interestingly, Sonalee Kulkarni was once nominated for a role that paid tribute to previous winner Usha Chavan.
- In terms of dual-category recognition, Sai Tamhankar and Amruta Subhash are the actress to win both the Best Actress and Best Supporting Actress awards. Neena Kulkarni have received awards in both categories, clinching a victory in Best Supporting Actress, while Sukanya Kulkarni, Usha Naik, and Suhas Joshi have been nominated for both categories but have won in the Best Actress category.
- Several actresses have received nominations in both Best Actress and Best Supporting Actress categories, including Nandita Patkar, Amruta Khanvilkar, Mrunmayee Deshpande, Mrinal Kulkarni, Sonalee Kulkarni, Geetanjali Kulkarni, Alka Kubal, Veena Jamkar, Ashwini Bhave and Priyadarshini Indalkar.
- On a broader scale, Smita Patil, Sonali Kulkarni, Renuka Shahane, Amruta Subhash, Sai Tamhankar, and Rohini Hattangadi have all received Filmfare nominations in both Hindi and Marathi across various categories. Meanwhile, Genelia Deshmukh stands out as the only actress to have been nominated for Filmfare Awards in both Marathi and South Indian cinema.

== Winners and nominees ==
=== 1970s ===
Year	Photos of winners	Actor	Role(s)	Film
1973		Sandhya Shantaram	Chandrakala	Pinjara
1973		No Other Nominee		
1974		Sarala Yeolekar	Gauri	Sugandhi Katta
1974		No Other Nominee		
1975		Sandhya Shantaram	Devaki	Chandnyanchi Choli Ang Ang Jali
1975		No Other Nominee		
1976		Asha Kale	Indumati (Gomu)	Ha Khel Sawalyancha
1976		No Other Nominee		
1977		Usha Chavan	Savita	Naav Motha Lakshan Khota
1977		No Other Nominee		
1978		Smita Patil	Chindhi	Jait Re Jait
1978		No Other Nominee		
1979		Ranjana Deshmukh	Sushila	Sushila
1979		No Other Nominee		

=== 1980s ===
Year	Photos of winners	Actor	Role(s)	Film
1980		Usha Chavan	Usha	Ran Pakhare
1980		No Other Nominee		
1981		Smita Patil	Sulbha Mahajan	Umbartha
1981		No Other Nominee		
1982		Madhu Kambikar	Bijli	Shapit
1982		No Other Nominee		
1983		Ranjana Deshmukh	Savitri	Savitri
1983		No Other Nominee		
1984		Supriya Pilgaonkar	Chameli Inamdar	Navri Mile Navryala
1984		No Other Nominee		
1985		Usha Naik	Laxmi	Deva Shappath Khara Sangen
1985		No Other Nominee		

=== 1990s ===
Year	Photos of winners	Actor	Role(s)	Film
1994		Sukanya Kulkarni	Laxmi	Varsa Laxmicha
1994		Neena Kulkarni	Bina Karnik	Savat Mazi Ladki
1994		Ashwini Bhave	Kamal Kamble	Vazir
1995		Renuka Shahane	Aboli	Aboli
1995		Sonali Kulkarni	Mukta	Mukta
1995		Nivedita Joshi-Saraf	Yashoda	Majha Chakula
1995		Neena Kulkarni	Sumitra Pradhan	Aai
1996		Sonali Kulkarni	Krishna	Doghi
1996		Adhishree Atre	Anji	Bangarwadi
1996		Alka Kubal	Aai	Suna Yeti Ghara
1997		Sukanya Kulkarni	Renu Salunkhe	Sarkarnama
1997		Sukanya Kulkarni	Swati	Putravati
1997		Madhu Kambikar	Mrs. Raosaheb	Rao Saheb
1998		Suhas Joshi	Usha Date	Tu Tithe Mee
1998		Varsha Usgaonkar	Pooja	Paij Lagnachi
1998		Alka Kubal	Shanti	Navsacha Por
1999		Sharvari Jamenis	Vaijayanti Patil	Bindhaast
1999		Sonali Kulkarni	Vasudha	Gharabaher
1999		Aishwarya Narkar	Aishwarya	Ghe Bharari

=== 2010s ===
Year	Photos of winners	Actor	Role(s)	Film	Ref.
2014		Sonali Kulkarni	Mandakini Amte	Dr. Prakash Baba Amte – The Real Hero	
2014		Iravati Harshe	Ira	Astu	
2014		Mrinal Kulkarni	Mugdha	Yellow	
2014		Priya Bapat	Janaki	Happy Journey	
2014		Usha Naik	Budhi	Ek Hazarachi Note	
2014		Veena Jamkar	Meera	Taptapadi	
2015		Mukta Barve	Manjiri Naik	Double Seat	
2015		Sonalee Kulkarni	Nandini	Mitwaa	
2015		Amruta Subhash	Aruna Kale	Killa	
2015		Mukta Barve	Gauri	Mumbai-Pune-Mumbai 2	
2015		Geetanjali Kulkarni	Nutan	Court	
2016		Rinku Rajguru	Archana (Archie) Patil	Sairat	
2016		Sai Tamhankar	Kaveri	Vazandar	
2016		Priya Bapat	Pooja	Vazandar	
2016		Medha Manjrekar	Kaveri Belwalkar	Natsamrat	
2016		Vandana Gupte	Malati	Family Katta	
2016		Veena Jamkar	Sandhya Parulekar	Lalbaugchi Rani	
2017		Sonali Kulkarni	Shaila Katdare	Kachcha Limboo	
2017		Sonalee Kulkarni	Isha	Hampi	
2017		Mrinmayee Godbole	Savitri (Savi)	Chi Va Chi Sau Ka	
2017		Mukta Barve	Samaira Joshi	Hrudayantar	
2017		Pooja Sawant	Neha	Lapachhapi	
2017		Priya Bapat	Keerti	Gachchi	

=== 2020s ===
Year	Photos of winners	Actor	Role(s)	Film	Ref.
2020		Mukta Barve	Nandini	Smile Please	
2020		Sonalee Kulkarni	Hirkani	Hirkani	
2020		Sayali Sanjeev	Haripriya	Aatpadi Nights	
2020		Mrunmayee Deshpande	Kaveri	Miss U Mister	
2020		Bhagyashree Milind	Anandi Joshi	Anandi Gopal	
2020		Nandita Patkar	Anandi	Baba	
2021		Sai Tamhankar	Harshada Ubhe	Dhurala	
2021		Nehha Pendse	Neha	June	
2021		Sayali Sanjeev	Swati	Basta	
2021		Sonali Kulkarni	Vimal	Pension	
2021		Sonalee Kulkarni	Usha Chavan	Pandu	
2021		Anaya Phatak	Sonu	Vegli Vaat	
2022		Sayali Sanjeev	Indrayani	Goshta Eka Paithanichi	
2022		Amruta Khanvilkar	Chandramukhi (Chandra) Junnarkar	Chandramukhi	
2022		Genelia Deshmukh	Shravani Jadhav	Ved	
2022		Sai Tamhankar	Nikita	Pondicherry	
2022		Mukta Barve	Dr. Aarti Deshmukh	Y	
2022		Sonalee Kulkarni	Shefali	Tamasha Live	
2023		Gauri Deshpande	Yashoda	Shyamchi Aai	
2023		Isha Keskar	Sarla	Sarla Ek Koti	
2023		Priyadarshini Indalkar	Phulrani	Phulrani	
2023		Rohini Hattangadi	Jaya	Baipan Bhaari Deva	
2023		Vandana Gupte	Shashi	Baipan Bhaari Deva	
2024		Prajakta Mali	Phullwanti	Phullwanti	
2024		Vaidehi Parshurami	Sayali	Ek Don Teen Chaar	
2024		Mukta Barve	Rani	Naach Ga Ghuma	
2024		Priyadarshini Indalkar	Sukanya	Navardev Bsc. Agri.	
2024		Sai Tamhankar	Sridevi	Sridevi Prasanna	
2024		Sonali Khare	Sharvari Dixit	Mylek	
2025		Amruta Subhash	Radha	Jarann	
2025		Hruta Durgule	Prachi Dixit	Aarpar	
2025		Renuka Shahane	Laxmi	Devmanus	
2025		Sai Tamhankar	Neeta Dhawale	Gulkand	
2025		Sajiri Joshi	Jaie Khedekar	April May 99	
