= Guru Pournima (film) =

2014 Indian film

- Directed by: Girish Mohite
- Written by: Swapnil Gangurde
- Produced by: Meghna Manoj Caculo
- Starring: Sai Tamhankar; Upendra Limaye; Sulabha Arya
- Cinematography: Santosh Shinde
- Music by: Avinash–Vishwajeet
- Production company: Shrihit Productions
- Release date: 12 September 2014
- Country: India
- Language: Marathi

Guru Pournima is an Indian Marathi language film directed by Girish Mohite and produced by Meghana Manoj Caculo. The film stars Sai Tamhankar, Upendra Limaye and Sulabha Arya. The film was released on 12 September 2014.

== Synopsis ==
Guru Pournima revolves around a love story of a creative director Guru and a struggling actress Pournima, who is ambitious and leaves her parents and family to pursue her acting career.

== Cast ==
- Sai Tamhankar double role as Pournima. aka Akanksha
- Upendra Limaye as Guru
- Sulabha Arya as Guru's mother
- Vidhita Kale
- Rajiv Hede
- Sushant

== Soundtrack ==
Guru Pournima

Soundtrack album by Avinash–Vishwajeet
- Released: 2014
- Recorded: 2014
- Genre: Feature film soundtrack
- Length: 21:26
- Language: Marathi

Official audio
- Guru Pournima – Full Album on YouTube

Track listing
No.	Title	Singer(s)	Length
1.	"Aikavi Watate"	Swapnil Bandodkar, Bela Shende	4:29
2.	"Visaruni Kshana"	Bela Shende	4:27
3.	"Aikavi Watate (Male Version)"	Swapnil Bandodkar	4:30
4.	"Aikavi Watate (Female Version)"	Bela Shende	4:30
5.	"Kalla Masti On The Way"	Swaroop Bhalwankar, Sandip Ubale, Neha Rajpal, Savani Ravindra	4:10
Total length:			21:26

== Critical response ==
Guru Pournima received mixed reviews from critics. Mihir Bhanage of The Times of India rated the film 3 out of 5 stars and wrote "Girish Mohite’s tale is as closely knit as relations should be and in portraying the importance of those, he has come out with flying colours". Ganesh Matkari of Pune Mirror wrote "Everyone including Sulabha Arya, who plays Guru’s mother, has performed admirably. The film looks good and works well in parts. Still, it lacks the overall punch". Paloma Sharma of Rediff rated the film 3 out of 5 stars and wrote " It is an engaging, sensitive and not frills film that deserves at least one watch". Soumitra Pote of Maharashtra Times rated the film 2.5 out of 5 stars and wrote "Overall, it is true that the student has passed. But, there is no situation to beat the marks obtained". A reviewer from Loksatta wrote "The twists required in a love story do not come here. So, if the good acting of the actors is omitted, the film falls short in reaching the audience".
