= The Secret of the Shiledars =

- Promotional release poster
- Genre: Mystery; Thriller
- Based on: Pratipaschandra by Prakāśa Suryakānta Koyāḍe
- Directed by: Aditya Sarpotdar
- Starring: Rajeev Khandelwal; Sai Tamhankar
- Country of origin: India
- Original language: Hindi
- No. of episodes: 6

Production
- Producer: Nitin Vaidya
- Camera setup: Multi-camera
- Running time: 30–42 minutes
- Production company: Dashami Creations

Original release
- Network: JioHotstar
- Release: 31 January 2025

The Secret of the Shiledars is an Indian Hindi-language mystery thriller television series directed by Aditya Sarpotdar. Produced by Nitin Vaidya under Dashami Creations, it stars Rajeev Khandelwal and Sai Tamhankar. The series premiered on 31 January 2025 on JioHotstar.

== Cast ==
- Rajeev Khandelwal
- Sai Tamhankar
- Gaurav Amlani
- Ashish Vidyarthi
- Dilip Prabhavalkar

== Production ==
The series was announced on JioHotstar. It is based on Prakāśa Suryakānta Koyāḍe's Pratipaschandra. Rajeev Khandelwal, Sai Tamhankar, Gaurav Amlani and Ashish Vidyarthi were cast to appear in the series. The filming took place in Badami Caves and Raigad Fort.

== Release ==
The teaser was released on 27 December 2024 and the trailer was released on 20 January 2025.

The series was made available to stream on JioHotstar on 31 January 2025.

== Reception ==
A critic from Eenadu and Hindustan Times reviewed the series.
