= India Lockdown =

2022 film by Madhur Bhandarkar

- Official release poster
- Directed by: Madhur Bhandarkar
- Written by: Amit Joshi; Aradhana Sah
- Produced by: Jayantilal Gada; Madhur Bhandarkar; Pranav Jain
- Starring: Shweta Basu Prasad; Aahana Kumra; Prateik Babbar; Sai Tamhankar; Prakash Belawadi
- Cinematography: Palash Das; Keiko Nakahara
- Production companies: Pen Studios; Bhandarkar Entertainment; PJ Motion Pictures
- Distributed by: ZEE5
- Release date: 2 December 2022
- Running time: 112 minutes
- Country: India
- Language: Hindi

India Lockdown is a 2022 Indian Hindi-language drama film directed by Madhur Bhandarkar and produced by P J Motion Pictures and Pen India Limited along with Bhandarkar Entertainment. The film stars an ensemble cast of Shweta Basu Prasad, Aahana Kumra, Prateik Babbar, Sai Tamhankar, Prakash Belawadi and Saanand Verma. The film was scheduled for a world premiere at the 52nd International Film Festival of India. The film was commercially released on ZEE5 on December 2, 2022. The movie deals with the repercussions of the COVID-19 lockdown in India and how the people of the country struggled through it.

== Plot ==
The film showcases four parallel stories – a father-daughter duo stuck in different cities, a sex worker and her troubles, a migrant worker with bare resources, and a pilot.

== Cast ==
- Shweta Basu Prasad as Mehrunissa
- Aahana Kumra as Moon Alves
- Prateik Babbar as Madhav
- Sai Tamhankar as Phoolmati
- Prakash Belawadi as M Nageshwar Rao
- Tahura Mansuri as Meenu
- Salim Siddiqui as Rafeeq Bhai
- Pankaj Jha Kashyap as Guddu
- Chanchlesh Singh as Kishan
- Zarin Shihab as Palak

== Production ==
The shoot of the film started after the 2020 lockdown. The shoots were wrapped by March 2021. The film secured a certification from the Central Board of Film Certification in October 2021.

== Marketing ==
The teaser trailer of the movie was released on November 8. when it was trending on X, Formerly known as Twitter leading to panic among the netizens in India of another lockdown being imposed by the Indian government.

== Release ==
It was announced in November 2022 that film would have a direct-to-digital release via ZEE5.

== Reception ==
Anuj Kumar for The Hindu wrote, "Madhur's treatment of subjects is usually high-pitched and he paints his scenarios with broad strokes, but here, he has roped in a cast of competent actors to convey what is not there on the page." Shubhra Gupta of The Indian Express rated the movie 1.5/5 and wrote "...an older woman rescues a younger one from the flesh trade. The rest is just banal story-telling, with little new to say." Zinia Bandyopadhyay of India Today gave the film a rating of 2/5 and wrote "Bhandarkar is an excellent director, and there is no doubt about that. But probably in his attempt to weave the story together, he missed other aspects like a compelling background score, or even performances, for that matter!" Ronak Kotecha of The Times of India rated the film 3/5 and wrote "More than 2 years after the first countrywide lockdown in India, director Madhur Bhandarkar and his writers (Amit Joshi and Aradhana Sah) have come up with a compilation of stories that are real and relatable."
