= Manvat Murders =

- Promotional release poster
- Genre: Crime; Thriller
- Written by: Girish Joshi
- Directed by: Ashish Avinash Bende
- Starring: Ashutosh Gowariker; Sai Tamhankar; Makarand Anaspure; Sonali Kulkarni; Kishor Kadam; Mayur Khandge
- Music by: Saket Kanetkar
- Country of origin: India
- Original language: Marathi
- No. of episodes: 8

Production
- Producers: Mahesh Kothare; Adinath Kothare
- Production locations: Maharashtra, India
- Cinematography: Satyajeet Shobha Shriram
- Editor: Faisal Mahadik
- Camera setup: Multi-camera
- Running time: 31-50 mins
- Production company: Storyteller's Nook

Original release
- Network: SonyLIV
- Release: 4 October 2024

Manvat Murders is an Indian crime thriller television series directed by Ashish Avinash Bende and written by Girish Joshi. Produced under Storyteller's Nook, starring Ashutosh Gowariker, Sai Tamhankar, Makarand Anaspure, Sonali Kulkarni, Kishor Kadam and Mayur Khandge. It premiered on SonyLIV on 4 October 2024.

== Cast ==
- Ashutosh Gowariker as Ramakant Kulkarni
- Sai Tamhankar as Samindri
- Makarand Anaspure as Uttamrao Barhate
- Sonali Kulkarni as Rukmini
- Umesh Jagtap as Paranje
- Shardul Saraf as Shukla
- Ketan Karande as Ponkshe
- Sagar Yadav as Ambadas
- Rupesh Jadhav as Kailash Barhate
- Kishor Kadam as Ganpat Salve
- Mayur Khandge as Vakatkar
- Treesha Thosar as Anita Kulkarni
- Vitthal Kale as Kaachu Paaku

== Production ==
The series was announced on SonyLIV. It is adapted from the book Footprints on the Sand of Crime by Ramakant S Kulkarni.

== Reception ==
- Shubhra Gupta of The Indian Express gave the series 2.5 stars out of 5.
- Deepa Gahlot of Rediff.com rated the series 3/5 stars.
- Mihir Bhanage of The Times of India rated the series 3/5 stars, noting that while it promises a lot, it delivers less.
- Saibal Chatterjee of NDTV also rated the series 3/5 stars, mentioning that it is unlikely to knock hardened viewers out of their socks.
- Vaibhavi Mishra of Gadgets 360 described the series as a chilling retelling of real-life occult killings but noted that it avoids the big questions.
