= Sai Tamhankar =

Indian actress (born 1986)

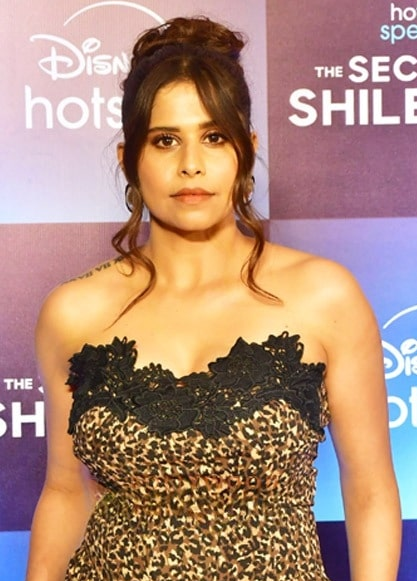
- Tamhankar in 2025
- Born: 25 June 1986 (age 40); Sangli, Maharashtra, India
- Education: Chintaman College of Commerce Sangli
- Occupation: Actress
- Years active: 2008–present
- Works: Full list
- Height: 170 cm (5 ft 7 in)
- Spouse: Amey Gosavi (m. 2013; div. 2015)
- Awards: Full list

Sai Tamhankar (pronunciation: [səiː t̪aːmɦəɳkəɾ]; born 25 June 1986) is an Indian film and television actress known for her work primarily in Marathi, as well as in Hindi films. She has established herself as a prominent figure in Marathi films and is recognised for her versatility and impactful performances. She is one of the highest-paid actresses in Marathi cinema and is the recipient of several awards including two Maharashtra State Film Awards, a Filmfare Award, three Filmfare Marathi Awards, and eight Maharashtracha Favourite Kon awards.

She began her career in television with supporting roles in Marathi series like Tuzyavina (2003) and gained recognition with Ya Gojirvanya Gharat. She later appeared in Hindi daily soap Kasturi and Anubandh (both 2007). She made her film debut in 2008 with minor roles in Subhash Ghai's Black & White and Aamir Khan's Ghajini, followed by her Marathi film debut in comedy Sanai Choughade (2008). Her performance earned her a nomination for Favorite Actress at Maharashtracha Favourite Kon. She continued to gain acclaim with roles in films like Rita (2009) and Ajab Lagnachi Gajab Gosht (2010). Tamhankar's performance as the strong-willed girl Shirin in Sanjay Jadhav's rom-com Duniyadari (2013) marked a significant turning point in her career, earning her several awards including the Maharashtra State Film Award for Best Special Appearance Actress. Her other notable films include the romantic thriller Classmates (2015), the adult comedy Hunterrr (2015), the family drama Family Katta (2016), and the comedy Vazandar (2016).

In 2018, Tamhankar gained recognition in Hindi films with Love Sonia, where she played a prostitute and continued to impress with roles in Marathi films like Girlfriend and Kulkarni Chaukatla Deshpande (2019). She won the Filmfare Award for Best Actress Marathi for Dhurala (2020) and received widespread acclaim for her role in Mimi (2021), for playing a Muslim friend of the title character, earning the Filmfare Award and IIFA Award for Best Supporting Actress. Tamhankar has also ventured into web series, notably Pet Puraan (2021), Manvat Murders (2024) and Matka King (2026). She starred in Sachin Kundalkar's Pondicherry (2022), receiving critical acclaim and awards for her performance as a single parent. Her recent works include India Lockdown (2022), Sridevi Prasanna (2024), Bhakshak (2024), Gulkand (2025) and Tumbadchi Manjula (2026).

In addition to her acting career, Tamhankar hosted the second season of the reality show Fu Bai Fu and has been judging Maharashtrachi Hasyajatra since 2018. She also owns the wrestling team Kolhapuri Maavle in the Zee Maharashtra Kusti Dangal.

== Early life ==
Tamhankar was born on 25 June 1986 in Sangli, Maharashtra, India, and studied at Swatantrya veer Savarkar Pratisthan, Pradnya Prabhodhini Prashala, Vishrambaug, Sangli. She was a state level Kabaddi player and has an orange belt in karate. She got into acting through a play directed by her mother's friend. Her second play, Aadhe Adhure, won her the Best Actress award, at an inter-college theater competition.

== Career ==
=== Television, film debut and breakthrough (2003–2012) ===
After her stint in plays, Tamhankar made her television debut with side roles in Tuzyavina in 2003. But she was recognised in the ETV Marathi daily soap Ya Gojirvanya Gharat. She played a tolerant wife opposite Avishkar Darvhekar. Further, she was seen in a few more daily soaps, including a supporting role in Ekta Kapoor's Kasturi and a surrogate role in Anubandh (both in 2007).

In 2008, she made her film debut with a supporting role in Subhash Ghai's crime thriller Black & White, and the Aamir Khan- starred Ghajini. The same year, she paired opposite Subodh Bhave and Shreyas Talpade in Sanai Choughade. This also marked her debut in the Marathi industry. Critic Ullas Shirke of Marathi Movie World noted, "Twice or thrice Sai’s inexperience can be noticed but in her debut movie she is much promising." She had received Favourite Actress nomination at Maharashtracha Favourite Kon. The following year, she was seen in the ensemble Haay Kaay...Naay Kaay, Sumbaran, and Be Dune Saade Char. Next, she appeared in Renuka Shahane's critically acclaimed Rita. Renuka Vyavahare of The Times of India remarked on her performance as "effective."

In 2010, she portrayed Lady Don opposite Umesh Kamat in the comedy Ajab Lagnachi Gajab Gosht, the plot revolving around Rajeev and Priya, who are diametrically opposite to each other, and their whimsical 'Marriage'. She also had a brief appearance in Mahesh Manjrekar's political thriller bilingual film City of Gold. Tamhankar in 2011 essayed a helpless wife in the suspense comedy Don Ghadicha Daav, the remake of B. R. Chopra's 1973 film Dhund, which was inspired by Agatha Christie's 1958 play The Unexpected Guest. Her next release was Rahul Thackeray directed Raada Rox. Both films were poorly received by critics and audiences. Her final release of that year was Ankush Chaudhari directed and starred Zhakaas. The film was a super hit at the box office. The film gained her an MFK Award for Favourite Supporting Actress nomination.

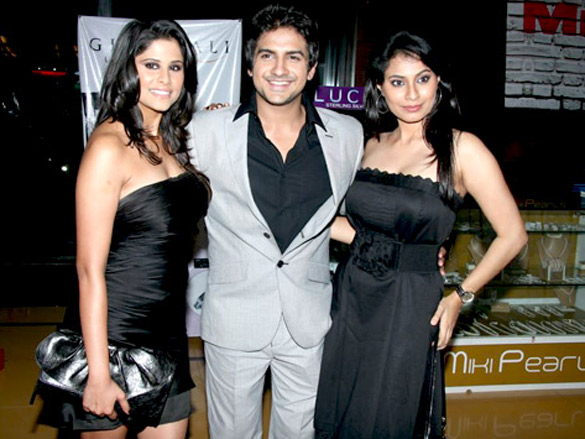
Tamhankar (left), Pushkar Jog (center) and Manisha Kelkar (right) at the premiere of Mission Possible (2010).

Next, she played the role of Bipasha Basu's character from No Entry (2005) in the Marathi remake titled No Entry Pudhe Dhokha Aahey. She played the role of a bargirl who acts as the wife of two men. As per the character requirement, she wore a two-piece bikini in the film, which was new and very rare in the Marathi industry. The Times of India critic called "Tamhankar is the USP of this movie" but criticised her bikini scene and wrote, "She has shown remarkable guts to adorn two piece bikini in Marathi movie, but she lacks the figure and attitude to carry such bold attire." Her other three releases of that year were Dhagedore, Baburao La Pakda and Aaghor.

In 2013, Tamhankar had ten releases, including Balak Palak, Ashach Eka Betavar, and Tendulkar Out. She featured in Nikhil Mahajan's directorial debut thriller film Pune 52, alongside Girish Kulkarni and Sonali Kulkarni. The film was loosely inspired by the 1974 Hollywood classic Chinatown. She appeared as a sexy, sophisticated woman who desired to be free of her cheating spouse. The film and her role were praised by critics, with a review carried by DNA mentioned her as "who surprises with a very crisp, controlled performance." Her next release was the acclaimed Anumati, directed by Gajendra Ahire. Generally, critics had mixed reviews about her not-so-glamorous role. Following this, she was in a supporting role in Mahesh Kothare's horror comedy Zapatlela 2 and Sameer Vidwans' romantic comedy Time Please. Her eighth release of that year was the romantic musical comedy Mangalashtak Once More, she depicted the role of a focused office colleague. Ullas Shirke of Marathi Movie World commented, "Tamhankar appeared as friendly appearance, she has a sizable role and she perfectly fits into that character of career minded Sahlini."

=== Rise to prominence (2013–2017) ===
Tamhankar garnered widespread recognition the same year for her starring role opposite Swapnil Joshi in Sanjay Jadhav's romantic drama Duniyadari. The plot is set against the backdrop of the late 1970s, about college campus, love-hate relationships, and eventually making them realise the true face of life. She portrayed a medical student who falls in love with Joshi's character. Duniyadari emerged as a major success with a cult status and a revenue of ₹30 crore (US$5.12 million), becoming a record of the highest grossing Marathi film of that time which was broke by Timepass (2014). Ullas Shirke of Marathi Movie World described her as "Tamhankar has found an important role to display her real acting skills. Till now, she was being used more as a glamour girl." She won the Maharashtra State Film Awards for Best Special Appearance Actress, the Zee Chitra Gaurav Puraskar for Best Actress and the MFK Award for Favourite Actress. Her last release was the Hindi political drama Wake Up India.

Her first release in 2014 was Sau Shashi Deodhar, a story about a woman struggling in her life due to a car accident. She plays the woman who goes through split personality disorder due to an accident. The critic wrote, "Sai’s confused and troubled state of mind is reflected in her emotions." She once again collaborated with Ahire for Postcard about human relationships. The film had its premier at the Goa Film Festival in 2013 and its theatrical release in April 2014. The Hollywood Reporter ascribed, "The nosy, laughing Tamhankar also surprises: by the end of the film, she’s the mother of two who pens stories as avidly as she once read private mail." She was next featured in the romantic drama Guru Pournima, a love story between a creative director, Guru, and a struggling actress, Pournima. The film had been shot in Goa and had faced controversy due to its title. Mihir Bhanage of TOI observed, "Sai is one actress who does well in whatever role she is given, and she doesn’t disappoint in her double role either" and concluded, "She is charming as the lover interest and effervescent as the daughter of Guru." Paloma Sharma of Rediff wrote, "Tamhankar play both mother and daughter seemed risky at first, the actress manages to pull it off with ease. Her physical transformation for both roles is worth applause." She was awarded the Best Actress Award at Sanskruti Kaladarpan. Next, she portrayed Professor in Manava Naik directed Por Bazaar, based on child trafficking. After the success of Duniyadari, the trio Jadhav, Joshi, and Tamhankar collaborated on the romantic Pyaar Vali Love Story. Upon release, the film received mixed reviews and moderate success at the box office.

In 2015, she appeared in a tomboy look in Aditya Sarpotdar's coming-of-age romantic drama Classmates, the official remake of the 2006 Malayalam film of the same name. The film features an ensemble cast of Choudhary, Sachit Patil, Sonalee Kulkarni, and Siddharth Chandekar. Overall, the film and the performances were well acclaimed. Keyur Seta of The Common Man Speaks praised the film and wrote, "Tamhankar proves to be effective once again in two starkly opposite characters." Jitendra More of Marathi Movie World found, "She suits well in the role of possessive Appu, but her performance is more dependent on the dialogues offered to her." Classmates grossed over ₹21 crore worldwide, becoming one of the highest-grossing Marathi films of the year. Her role won her the MFK Award for Favourite Supporting Actress and nominations at the Filmfare Award for Best Supporting Actress Marathi and the Zee Chitra Gaurav Puraskar for Best Supporting Actress. Her other two Marathi film releases were 3:56 Killari and Tu Hi Re, opposite Jackie Shroff and Joshi, respectively. She was seen as a housewife in the Hindi adult comedy Hunterrr, opposite Gulshan Devaiah. The story revolves around an unassuming sex addict and his lustful journey in life. Raja Sen of Rediff said, "Tamhankar brings power to the role of the attractive neighbourhood bhabhi" Hunterrr earned over ₹11.2 crore worldwide against a production budget of ₹3 crore.

Her first release of 2016 was Sameer Vidwans directed YZ, she played a religiously homely girl in it. Ganesh Matkari of the Pune Mirror noted, "Tamhankar as Parnrekha is cast against type, which helps the character immensely." She next portrayed the youngest daughter of the Sabnis family, who had married a man of a different caste and age, unwilling to her father's wish, in the Vandana Gupte produced family drama film Family Katta. The film was highly acclaimed by critics and the audience. She won the Filmfare Marathi Award and Sanskruti Kaladarpan in the Best Supporting Actress category. The same year, she was seen in Girish Kulkarni's comedy Jaundya Na Balasaheb. For her performance, she won the second MFK Award for Favourite Actress. Her last release was slice-of-life Vazandar, alongside Priya Bapat. Tamhankar took on the role of a newlywed lady who sticks to the traditions of her in-law’s family, portraying beautifully the life of a woman who loves the comfort of her home but also wants to break free and take her own decisions on her own. Amruta Deshpande of Indian Nerve wrote that Sai "does complete justice to her role."

The following year, she had only one release Malayalam-Tamil bilingual anthology film, Solo. She had a brief role in the part featuring Dulquer Salmaan titled World of Siva.

=== Recognition in Hindi films and web series (2018–present) ===
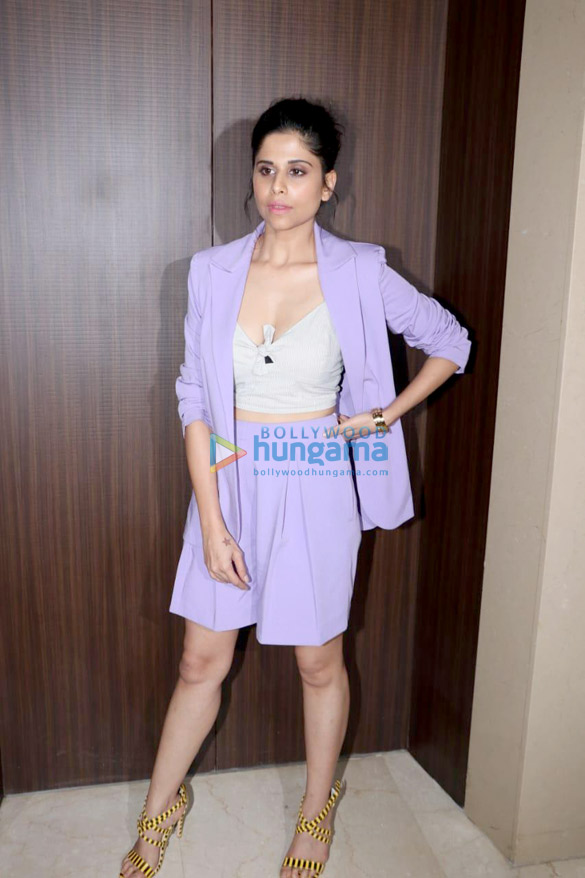
Tamhankar at the special screening of the film Love Sonia (2018).

In 2018, she worked with Sharad Kelkar in the fantasy thriller Rakshas. The plot revolves around a missing documentary filmmaker and his daughter’s quest to bring him back. Mihir Bhanage of The Times of India found Tamhankar's worried wife "fantastic." She next was seen playing Anjali, a pimp in Love Sonia, for which she had to gain 10 kg of weight. Love Sonia had its world premiere at the London Indian Film Festival. Upon release, the film gained positive reviews but failed commercially. Her final release was adult coming-of-age Ashleel Udyog Mitra Mandal, in which she depicted the controversial fictional character Savita Bhabhi. Mihir Bhanage of The Times of India bemoaned that "there’s not much for her to do here." These films were not so well performed at the box office.

Tamhankar had two film releases Girlfriend and Kulkarni Chaukatla Deshpande. Girlfriend is based on the pressure youngsters face when it comes to being in a romantic relationship and plays a title role in Kulkarni Chaukatla Deshpande, who is a rebellious middle-class girl. The film focuses on her relationships and unfolds the journey of different relations on the path of her life. In 2020, she won the Filmfare Award for Best Actress Marathi for the political drama Dhurala, opposite Chaudhari. Abhay Salvi of Marathi Stars wrote, "Tamhankar again hits it out of the park with her extremely sensitive performance!"

In 2021, Tamhankar and Lalit Prabhakar were paired together in three projects, including Sony LIV's web series Pet Puran, Lokmat critics praised the series and commented, "Aditi's role is very well performed by Sai, a different Sai is seen in it" and two films. Their first release was Mohit Takalkar's Medium Spicy. Mihir Bhanage opined that "as Gowri adds yet another interesting and noteworthy character to her repertoire" and Colorphool, a soft-hearted romantic film. She gained widespread recognition for her role as Muslim friend Shama to Kriti's character in Laxman Utekar's comedy drama Mimi. The film is a remake of the 2011 National Award-winning Marathi film Mala Aai Vhhaychy!. For her role, she learned Urdu as well as the Rajasthani dialect for her role. It was directly released on streaming platform Netflix and JioCinema and was highly acclaimed. Taran Adarsh of Bollywood Hungama mentioned, "Tamhankar lends able support and leaves a huge mark as a supportive friend" and Jyoti Kanyal of India Today added, "Sai Tamhankar, who plays Mimi's best friend Shama, plays her part to the T." Mimi won her various accolades, including the Filmfare Award for Best Supporting Actress and the IIFA Award for Best Supporting Actress. That year, she was also seen in the second season of the Marathi web series Samantar 2. Scroll.in reviewer found her most memorable character of the series, and the Tamil language anthological series Navarasa, where she played the wife of Vijay Sethupathi.

Next, she starred alongside Vaibhav Tatwawadi and Amruta Khanvilkar in Sachin Kundalkar's relationship drama Pondicherry. It was the first Marathi and one of the first Indian feature films to be shot completely on a smartphone. Her role as a young widow mother running a homestay at an old family villa in Pondicherry received her Filmfare Critics Award for Best Actress and Pravah Picture Award for Best Actress wins, as well as nominations at the Sakal Premier Awards, Planet Marathi Film & OTT Awards, and Fakt Marathi Cine Sanman. Suyog Zore of Cinestaan called it "the best performance of her career" and wrote, "With just a look, she conveys the emotional turmoil of Nikita—the silent sobs, her sleepless nights and the longing for someone she can share her pain with." Her next release was Madhur Bhandarkar's multi-starrer India Lockdown, showcasing the repercussions of the COVID-19 lockdown in India and how the people of the country struggled through it. Shubhra Gupta of The Indian Express commented on her performance, saying she "immerses herself into the character"

In 2024, Tamhankar alongside Chandekar played the title character in romantic drama Sridevi Prasanna, in which she girl who comes from a filmi family in search of love marriage. Kalpeshraj Kubal of The Times of India noted "Sai's eyes speak a thousand words even in scenes that she has no lines in." She next starred as a supportive police officer in the Netflix crime thriller film Bhakshak which was based on the Muzaffarpur shelter case. Hindustan Times' Monika Kukreja wrote "Tamhankar as SSP Jasmeet Kaur is a very thoughtful addition to the cast, and she brings intensity and gravitas to the story." That same year, she starred alongside Ashutosh Gowariker in the crime-thriller web series Manvat Murders. Based on a true crime case from 1972, the series examined seven brutal murders in a rural Maharashtra town, with Tamhankar playing Samindri, a subdued, emotionally torn young woman entangled in the family’s silence surrounding the crimes. Reviewing the show, Deepa Gahlot of Rediff.com wrote, "Tamhankar, as the reluctantly obedient sister, gets the better scenes and gives an excellent performance." This was followed by action-oriented roles in Aditya Sarpotdar’s mystery thriller series The Secret of the Shiledars and Netflix’s crime drama series Dabba Cartel. She then played the female lead in the Hindi action film Ground Zero, portraying the wife of BSF officer Narendra Nath Dhar Dubey, played by Emraan Hashmi; however, the film underperformed commercially. She also appeared in the Marathi ensemble comedy Gulkand, which emerged as one of the highest-grossing Marathi films of the year, earning ₹8.14 crore worldwide. Santosh Bhingarde of Sakal noted her usual style and wrote, "There is experience and understanding of emotions woven into each of her frames."

== Other work ==
She owns Kolhapuri Maavle, a wrestling team in the Zee Maharashtra Kusti Dangal.

== Personal life ==
Tamhankar got engaged to Amey Gosavi, a visual effects artist, on 7 April 2012. They were married on 15 December 2013 and divorced in 2015.

She later began dating Marathi filmmaker Anish Joag. However, Sai confirmed their breakup in October 2024.
