= Love Sonia =

2018 Indian drama film

- Directed by: Tabrez Noorani
- Written by: Alkesh Vaja
- Produced by: David Womark
- Starring: Mrunal Thakur; Freida Pinto; Demi Moore; Mark Duplass; Manoj Bajpayee; Rajkummar Rao; Richa Chadda; Riya Sisodiya; Anupam Kher; Adil Hussain; Sai Tamhankar; Sunny Pawar
- Music by: A. R. Rahman
- Distributed by: Zee Studios
- Release dates: 21 June 2018 (London Indian Film Festival); 14 September 2018 (India)
- Running time: 120 minutes
- Country: India
- Language: Hindi

Love Sonia is a 2018 Indian Hindi-language drama film directed by Tabrez Noorani and produced by David Womark. The film features newcomer Mrunal Thakur as the title character along with Riya Sisodiya, Freida Pinto, Demi Moore, Manoj Bajpayee, Richa Chadda, Anupam Kher, Adil Hussain, Rajkummar Rao, and Sai Tamhankar. Love Sonia had its world premiere at the London Indian Film Festival on 21 June 2018. The film was released in India on 14 September 2018 and theatrically in the UK on 25 January 2019.

== Synopsis ==
The film follows two sisters as one is sold into prostitution by her debt-ridden father, and the other follows after her in the hope of rescuing her but becomes trapped in the sex trade herself.

== Plot ==
Preeti and Sonia are the daughters of a poor debt-ridden farmer, Shiva, who lives approximately 1400 kms from Mumbai. The sisters love each other deeply and are willing to go to any length to protect each other. A village boy named Amar is deeply in love with Sonia. Amar helps the sisters create their individual email accounts to stay in touch with each other.

Shiva, who is indebted to the local landlord Dada Thakur, agrees to sell Preeti to a prostitute Anjali, to pay off his debt. Sonia desperately attempts to save Preeti from being sold but fails. That night, she mercifully requests Dada Thakur to send her to Mumbai, to meet Preeti. Subsequently, Anjali whisks away Sonia to Mumbai under the pretext of reuniting her with Preeti. Anjali sells her in a brothel owned by Faizal a.k.a. Babu and controlled by the brothel madame Madhuri.

Sonia is terribly scared and traumatized by the atmosphere of the brothel. Another prostitute Rashmi befriends her. While trying to escape from the brothel Sonia is caught by Faizal who threatens to kill her if she tries to run away again. After multiple pleas, Faizal agrees to let Sonia meet Preeti, who has become a drug-addict and a high profile prostitute. Preeti angrily reprimands Sonia for letting their dad sell her and throws her away and she was jealous of her. Meanwhile, Shiva begs Dada Thakur to return Sonia to him. Anjali provides Shiva the address to Kamathipura and directs him to Mumbai. Shiva frantically searches for Sonia in all the red-light areas of Mumbai. Meanwhile, a social worker named Manish approaches Sonia and extracts details about Preeti from her. He raids Faizal's brothel to rescue Sonia and another pre-teen named Asha. However, Sonia refuses to leave. Rashmi severs ties with Sonia when she accuses her of stealing Preeti's anklet, the only souvenir of Preeti left with Sonia. Faizal ships off Madhuri, Sonia and several other girls to Hong Kong in a cargo container. Madhuri, who till that time was hostile towards Sonia, starts looking after her affectionately. Sonia ends up getting raped by an American customer. She forcefully undergoes a hymen reconstruction surgery to appear a virgin. The girls are again shipped to Los Angeles, where a relatively friendly client allows Sonia to get in touch with Amar via email. He also gifts her a mobile phone. At a party, Madhuri commits suicide by slitting her wrist.

Sonia runs away from her handlers, deep into the forests. A destitute Sonia, while trying to eat from a dustbin, is rescued by a social worker Salma who runs a NGO named C.A.S.T. Sonia finally finds peace of mind in the shelter home along with several other rescued girls and women. One day, Salma and Manish surprise her by reconnecting her with Preeti over a video call. Preeti tearfully asks for forgiveness and requests her to return. Six months later, Sonia returns to Manish's shelter home where she shockingly finds out that Preeti has gone back to prostitution due to her drug addiction. Sonia begins her life all over again with a renewed hope in the shelter home. Her parents come to meet her but she refuses to go with them. She also patches up with Amar. Finally, she sends an email to Preeti stating that no matter what happens, she will surely find her someday and Sonia says her sister is the most beautiful girl in the world.

== Cast ==
- Mrunal Thakur as Sonia Singhania
- Richa Chadda as Madhuri
- Anupam Kher as Baldev Singh/Dada Thakur
- Adil Hussain as Shiva Singhania; Sonia and Preeti’s father
- Rajkummar Rao as Manish
- Sai Tamhankar as Anjali
- Mark Duplass as an American expatriate
- Demi Moore as Selma
- Manoj Bajpayee as Faizal/Babu
- Freida Pinto as Rashmi
- Riya Sisodiya as Preeti Singhania
- Abhishek Bharate as Amar Kumar; Sonia’s love interest
- Ankur Vikal as hotel manager
- Sunny Pawar as Bang Bang
- Kiran Khoje as Sonia and Preeti’s mother
- Barbie Rajput as Asha
- Aarti Mann as Jiah
- Abhinav Gupta as Bunty Bhai
- Nikhil Raj as Jeetu

== Production ==
=== Development ===
Tabrez Noorani was inspired to make Love Sonia after he was introduced to the severity of human trafficking in Los Angeles in 2003, when some girls were found in a shipping container from China. One of them was a young Indian girl. The incident inspired Noorani to work with non-governmental organizations focused on trafficking in Los Angeles. He has also participated in several brothel raids. Noorani and Womark met on Ang Lee's Life of Pi and have been working on the project for three years. This film basically revolves around a scenario that depicts the human trafficking of girls in & from the red-light areas of Mumbai on a large scale.

=== Casting ===
Mrunal Thakur was cast in the title role after a year long search from over 2,500 girls.

=== Filming ===
The principal photography started in late April 2016 in India. The project was also filmed in Hong Kong and Los Angeles.

== Awards and nominations ==
Award	Date of ceremony (Note: Date is linked to the article about the awards held that year, wherever possible.)	Category	Recipient(s)	Result	Ref.
Indian Film Festival of Melbourne	10 Aug 2018 – 22 Aug 2018	Best Indie Film	Love Sonia	Won	
Indian Film Festival of Melbourne	10 Aug 2018 – 22 Aug 2018	Best Director	Tabrez Noorani	Nominated	
Indian Film Festival of Melbourne	10 Aug 2018 – 22 Aug 2018	Best Supporting Performance	Richa Chadda	Won	
Indian Film Festival of Melbourne	10 Aug 2018 – 22 Aug 2018	Best Supporting Performance	Freida Pinto	Nominated	
London Indian Film Festival	21 Jun 2018 – 29 Jun 2018	Best Newcomer Award	Mrunal Thakur	Won	
London Indian Film Festival	21 Jun 2018 – 29 Jun 2018	Outstanding Achievement Award	Richa Chadda	Won	
