= 3:56 Killari =

- Theatrical release poster
- Directed by: Deepak Bhagwat
- Written by: Deepak Bhagwat
- Screenplay by: Deepak Bhagwat
- Produced by: Girish Sathe
- Starring: Jackie Shroff, Sai Tamhankar, Gauri Ingawale, Anurag Sharma, Pankaj Vishnu, Shrikant Moghe, Rama Joshi
- Cinematography: Vijay Mishra
- Edited by: Jayant Jathar
- Music by: Chinar - Mahesh
- Production companies: Arbhaat Films, Kharapoos Films
- Release date: 21 August 2015
- Running time: 125 minutes
- Country: India
- Language: Marathi

3:56 Killari (Marathi: ३:५६ किल्लारी) is a Marathi language film directed by Deepak Bhagwat and starring Jackie Shroff, Sai Tamhankar, Gauri Ingawale, Anurag Sharma, Pankaj Vishnu, Shrikant Moghe, Rama Joshi. The film was released on 21 August 2015.

== Plot ==
An adolescent girl Sharayu (Gauri Ingawale) living happily. Her parents are killed but she is saved. She goes to live with her grandparents at Killari, there she experiences mysterious flashes at various places destroyed during the 1993 earthquake, her grandparents send her to a catholic hostel managed by a Catholic Father (Jackie Shroff), who is helped by a counselor (Sai Tamhankar). What happens next is the story.

== Cast ==
- Jackie Shroff
- Sai Tamhankar
- Gauri Ingawale as Sharayu
- Anurag Sharma
- Pankaj Vishnu
- Shrikant Moghe
- Rama Joshi

== Soundtrack ==
The music was composed By Chinar - Mahesh and released by Zee Music Company.

3:56 Killari

Soundtrack album by Chinar - Mahesh
- Released: Jul 31, 2015
- Recorded: 2015
- Genre: Soundtrack
- Length: 19:06
- Label: Zee Music Company
- Producer: Chinar - Mahesh

Chinar - Mahesh chronology
Timepass 2 (2015)	3:56 Killari (2015)	Urfi (2015)

Track list
No.	Title	Lyrics	Singer(s)	Length
1.	"Kovlya Kirnanchi"	Chandrashekhar Sanekar	Rishikesh Kamerkar, Neha Rajpal	4:16
2.	"Tu Ekaki"	Chandrashekhar Sanekar	Hariharan	5:51
3.	"Abhas Ha"	Chandrashekhar Sanekar	Mahalakshmi Iyer	4:25
4.	"Abhas Ha - Instrumental"		Instrumental	4:34
Total length:				19:06
