= Pet Puraan =

Indian Marathi social comedy web series

- Genre: Drama & Family
- Created by: Dnyanesh Zoting
- Written by: Dnyanesh Zoting
- Starring: Sai Tamhankar; Lalit Prabhakar
- Country of origin: India
- Original language: Marathi
- No. of seasons: 1
- No. of episodes: 7

Production
- Cinematography: Pushkar Zoting
- Production company: Huge Productions

Original release
- Network: SonyLIV
- Release: 6 May 2022

Pet Puraan is an Indian Marathi slice of life, social comedy web series streaming on SonyLIV, directed by Dnyanesh Zoting and produced by Huge Production and Ranjit Gugle.

The web series was released on 6 May 2022, exclusively on SonyLIV. It consisted of seven episodes.

== Cast ==
- Sai Tamhankar
- Lalit Prabhakar

== Episodic synopsis ==
Episode 1

Aditi and Atul are attending Anjali’s dohal jevan. Done with their relatives' unwanted bits of advice, the duo leaves the event. While on their way home, a call from Parag makes the couple realize their affection for pets, and they decide to be pet parents.

Episode 2

Atul and Aditi start looking for a pet, and it's during this process they realize that cats and dogs can be ideal pets. They decide to adopt a dog but luck takes them to another place.

Episode 3

The couple visits an NGO, only to find out bad news. To lighten their mood they decide to celebrate their anniversary at the same time, Aditi stumbles upon a kitten and adopts her. Upon receiving an unexpected call, Aditi and Atul take the help of their friends to rearrange the house for a guest. But things take a turn.

Episode 4

Upon wholeheartedly convincing Ms. Dsouza, they get to keep Vyanku (Dog). After a hell of a hard time, Aditi & Atul train their pets with Bhaskar's help. And in no time, the news of them becoming pet parents starts spreading. As the doorbell rings, Atul and Aditi are in shock to find an unwanted surprise.

Episode 5

Atul and Aditi try to explain the thought of becoming pet parents over raising kids of their own, but their mothers refuse to understand. As the couple resumes work, their mothers miraculously agree to look after Baku and Vyanku.

Episode 6

Ashalata and Shamla, unfortunately, change their minds, making Aditi & Atul look for a pet sitter. Mrs. Vyas soon discovers that her son is bonding well with Baku & Vyanku. Meanwhile, Atul’s colleague finds out that he has pets in his house.

Episode 7

After a lot of hard work, Aditi & Atul's search comes to an end. However, the pet sitter is soon fired for his reckless behavior, it's then Mrs. Vyas steps in to help the couple. Well, more troubles await Atul after his boss finds out about Baku & Vyanku.
