= Rakshas (film) =

Raakshas
- Theatrical release poster
- Directed by: Dnyanesh Zoting
- Screenplay by: Dnyanesh Zoting
- Story by: Dnyanesh Zoting; Tanmayee Deo
- Produced by: Nilesh Navalakha; Vivek Kajaria
- Starring: Sharad Kelkar; Sai Tamhankar; Vijay Mourya; Umesh Jagtap; Rujuta Deshpande
- Cinematography: Mayur Hardas (Additional Photography); Rakesh Bhillare; Sayak Bhattacharya
- Edited by: Mayur Hardas (Co-Editor); Charu Shree Roy
- Music by: Andrew Mackay
- Production companies: Navalakha Arts and Holy Basil Productions
- Distributed by: Navalakha Arts and Holy Basil Productions
- Release date: 23 February 2018
- Running time: 119 minutes
- Country: India
- Language: Marathi

Raakshas (English: Monster) is a 2018 Indian Marathi-language fantasy thriller film written and directed by Dnyanesh Zoting, produced by Nilesh Navalakha and Vivek Kajaria. It was the first-time pairing of Sharad Kelkar and Sai Tamhankar, along with Vijay Maurya and Umesh Jagtap. Rujuta Deshpande also portrayed a very important role in the film. The shooting of the film was held in 2015. The film released on 23 February 2018.

== Plot ==
The story revolves around a missing documentary filmmaker and his daughter’s quest to bring him back.

== Cast ==
- Sai Tamhankar
- Sharad Kelkar
- Rujuta Deshpande
- Daya Shankar Pandey
- Vijay Maurya
- Yakub Sayeed
- Purnanand Wandhekar
- Umesh Jagtap
- Vitthal Kale
- Pankaj Sathe
- Anuya Kalaskar
- Anil Kamble
- Makarand Sathe
- Jayesh Sanghavi
- Sakshi Vyavhare
- Abhijeet Zunjarrao
- Somanath Limbarka

== Reception ==
=== Critical reception ===
Mihir Bhanage of The Times of India gave the film a rating of 3.5 out of 5 saying that, "Raakshas explores the unexplored. Shot almost entirely in the jungle, the woods become an integral character in the story. In terms of performances, this film earns brownie points." Shriram Iyengar of Cinestaan gave the film a rating of 2 out of 5 and said that, "Dyanesh Zoting's parable of a jungle monster around the story of land-grabbing conglomerates is a good attempt at magical realism but lacks the finishing touch that could have truly made it magical." Marathi Stars praised the acting performances of Sai Tamhankar and Rujuta Deshpande, direction as well as the technical aspects of the film but criticized the conclusion given to the story. The critic said that, "A better screenplay & a more original ‘fantasy’ world would have made wonders to this film. But still as a director Dnyanesh Zoting makes his presence felt." and gave the film a rating of 2.5 out of 5. Shubhra Gupta of The Indian Express praised the concept of the film and the acting performances. The critic gave the film a rating of 2.5 out of 5 and said that, "The melding of the myth and the real is not as effective, though, and the film becomes repetitive in places. But overall, ‘Raakshas’ holds, and is a welcome step in the direction of making non-Hindi contemporary, inventive cinema accessible to all."
