= Gulkand (film) =

2025 Indian Marathi-language film by Sachin Goswami

- Theatrical release poster
- Directed by: Sachin Goswami
- Written by: Sachin Mote
- Produced by: Sachin Goswami; Sachin Mote; Sanjay Chabria
- Starring: Sai Tamhankar; Samir Choughule; Prasad Oak; Esha Dey
- Cinematography: Udaysingh Mohite
- Edited by: Mayur Hardas
- Music by: Avinash–Vishwajeet; Amir Hadkar
- Production companies: Everest Entertainment; Wetcloud Productions
- Distributed by: PVR Inox Pictures
- Release date: 1 May 2025
- Running time: 146 minutes
- Country: India
- Language: Marathi
- Budget: ₹4 crore
- Box office: ₹8 crore

Gulkand is a 2025 Indian Marathi-language family comedy film directed by Sachin Goswami and written by Sachin Mote. The film stars Sai Tamhankar, Samir Choughule, Esha Dey, Prasad Oak, Vanita Kharat, Mandar Mandavkar, Jui Bhagwat, Tejas Raut and Sarvil Apte in lead roles.

The film was released on 1 May 2025 in theatres, coinciding with Maharashtra Day.

== Plot ==
The film follows Omkar (Tejas Raut) and Minakshi (Jui Bhagwat), two lovers who wish to marry but face unexpected resistance from within their own families.

Years earlier, Minakshi's mother, Neeta Dhawale (Sai Tamhankar), and Omkar's father, Girish Mane (Prasad Oak), had been in love during their college days but were unable to marry. When the two families meet to discuss Omkar and Minakshi's marriage, Neeta and Girish reconnect, and their past feelings begin to resurface.

Ragini Mane (Esha Dey), Omkar's mother, discovers messages exchanged between her husband and Neeta. Suspecting an affair, she alerts Minakshi's father, Makarand Dhawale (Samir Choughule). Together, Ragini and Makarand start monitoring Girish and Neeta. Their frequent interactions, however, create the impression that they themselves are developing a relationship, a misunderstanding that even Omkar begins to believe after finding apparent evidence.

Concerned that Omkar and Minakshi's marriage would give Neeta and Girish more freedom to rekindle their old romance, Ragini and Makarand resort to increasingly unusual schemes to prevent the wedding. The story then examines whether Omkar and Minakshi are ultimately able to marry, and what becomes of the renewed connection between Girish and Neeta.

== Cast ==
- Sai Tamhankar as Neeta Dhawale
- Samir Choughule as Makarand Dhawale
- Prasad Oak as Girish Mane
- Esha Dey as Ragini Mane
- Mandar Mandavkar as Munna
- Jui Bhagwat as Meenakshi Dhawale
- Vanita Kharat as Vanita Dhone Bai
- Tejas Raut as Omkar Mane
- Sarvil Apte as Nakul Dhawale

== Production ==
The principal photography commenced on 11 May 2024.

== Soundtrack ==
=== Track listing ===
Gulkand (film)
No.	Title	Lyrics	Music	Singer(s)	Length
1.	"Chanchal"	Mandar Cholkar	Avinash–Vishwajeet	Aanandi Joshi, Rohit Raut	3:53
2.	"Chal Jau Date Var"	Prashant Madpuwar	Avinash–Vishwajeet	Avadhoot Gupte & Vaishali Samant	3:21
3.	"Premacha Gulkand"	Sachin Mote	Amir Hadkar	Rohit Raut, Saavaniee Ravindra, Ashish Kulkarni	3:43
Total length:					12:35

== Marketing ==
On 30 March 2025, the film's cast participated in the Shobhayatra held in Girgaon as part of their promotional campaign. The trailer was launched on 9 April 2025. As part of the promotional activities, actors Sai Tamhankar, Samir Choughule, Prasad Oak, and Esha Dey made a special appearance in the Marathi television show Lagnanantarach Hoil Prem.

== Release ==
=== Theatrical ===
The film was released on 1 May 2025 in theatres.

=== Home media ===
The digital streaming rights of the film was acquired by Amazon Prime.

== Reception ==
=== Critical reception ===
Santosh Bhingarde of Sakal rated 4 stars out of 5 stars and wrote "This is a story and screenplay that is full of humor and is accompanied by lively and witty dialogues."

Bhagyashree Rasal of Maharashtra Times rated 3 stars out of 5 stars and wrote "Gulkand is not just a family film; it is a mirror that reveals the subtle yet stark contradictions between today's generation's concepts of love, traditional expectations, and relationships."

Anub George of The Times of India rated 3.5 stars out of 5 stars and wrote, "A few dull moments aside, the plot of Gulkand effortlessly progresses from comedy to heartfelt confessions, offering a wholesome family viewing experience that is guaranteed to leave sweet and memorable thoughts in your heart."

=== Box office ===
The film earned ₹55 lakh on its opening day and ₹1.37 crore within the first three days. By the end of its first week, it had collected ₹2.38 crore. On the ninth day, its total earnings crossed ₹3 crore, reaching ₹3.11 crore. After thirteen days, the film had grossed ₹4.45 crore and ₹5.25 crore in seventeen days.

The film collected ₹7.29 crore in thirty one days of release. It finished its theatrical run with ₹8 crore collection.

=== Accolades ===
Awards	Year	Category	Recipient	Result	Ref
Ambarnath Marathi Film Festival	2026	Best Entertaining Film	Gulkand	Won	
Ambarnath Marathi Film Festival	2026	Best Actor in Comedy	Samir Choughule	Won	
Ambarnath Marathi Film Festival	2026	Best Art Director	Santosh Phutane	Won	
Ambarnath Marathi Film Festival	2026	Best Dialogue	Sachin Mote	Won	
Ambarnath Marathi Film Festival	2026	Best Female Playback Singer	Vaishali Samant (Chal Jau Date Var)	Won	
Ambarnath Marathi Film Festival	2026	Best Choreographer	Rajesh Bidwe (Chal Jau Date Var)	Won	
Zee Chitra Gaurav Puraskar	2026	Best Actress	Sai Tamhankar	Nominated	
Zee Chitra Gaurav Puraskar	2026	Best Actor in Comedy	Samir Choughule	Won	
Zee Chitra Gaurav Puraskar	2026	Best Actress in Comedy	Esha Dey	Won	
Zee Chitra Gaurav Puraskar	2026	Best Dialogue	Sachin Mote	Nominated	
Zee Chitra Gaurav Puraskar	2026	Best Screenplay	Sachin Mote	Nominated	
Zee Chitra Gaurav Puraskar	2026	Best Editor	Mayur Hardas	Nominated	
Zee Chitra Gaurav Puraskar	2026	Best Choreographer	Rajesh Bidwe	Nominated	
Ma Ta Sanman	2026	Best Supporting Actress	Esha Dey	Nominated	
Ma Ta Sanman	2026	Best Editor	Mayur Hardas	Nominated	
Indian National Cine Academy	2026	Best Film	Gulkand	Nominated	
Indian National Cine Academy	2026	Best Director	Sachin Goswami	Nominated	
Indian National Cine Academy	2026	Best Actress	Sai Tamhankar	Nominated	
Sanskrutik Kaladarpan	2026	Best Film	Gulkand	Nominated	
Sanskrutik Kaladarpan	2026	Best Director	Sachin Goswami	Nominated	
Sanskrutik Kaladarpan	2026	Best Actress	Sai Tamhankar	Nominated	
Sanskrutik Kaladarpan	2026	Best Actor in Comedy	Samir Choughule	Won	
Sanskrutik Kaladarpan	2026	Best Actress in Comedy	Esha Dey	Won	
Sanskrutik Kaladarpan	2026	Best Actress in Comedy	Vanita Kharat	Nominated	
Sanskrutik Kaladarpan	2026	Best Music Director	Amir Hadkar	Nominated	
Sanskrutik Kaladarpan	2026	Best Playback Singer Male	Rohit Raut (Chanchal)	Won	
Sanskrutik Kaladarpan	2026	Best Playback Singer Male	Avadhoot Gupte (Chal Jau Date Var)	Nominated	
Sanskrutik Kaladarpan	2026	Best Screenplay	Sachin Mote	Won	
Sanskrutik Kaladarpan	2026	Best Dialogue	Sachin Mote	Nominated	
Sanskrutik Kaladarpan	2026	Best Editor	Mayur Hardas	Nominated	
Sanskrutik Kaladarpan	2026	Best Makeup Artist	Digambar Panda	Nominated	
Filmfare Awards Marathi	2026	Best Actress	Sai Tamhankar	Nominated	
Filmfare Awards Marathi	2026	Best Supporting Actor	Samir Choughule	Nominated	
Filmfare Awards Marathi	2026	Best Actor Critic	Prasad Oak	Nominated	
