= Rita (2009 Indian film) =

- Official Poster
- Directed by: Renuka Shahane
- Written by: Shanta Gokhale
- Screenplay by: Renuka Shahane
- Story by: Shanta Gokhale
- Based on: Marathi Novel ‘Rita Welingkar’ by Shanta Gokhale
- Produced by: Aarti Shetty, Pooja Shetty Devara
- Starring: Pallavi Joshi, Jakie Shroff, Renuka Shahane, Dr. Mohan Agashe, Tushar Dalvi, Suhasini Mulay, Sai Tamhankar, Makarand Deshpande, Medha Jambotkar, Tucha Vaidya, Rajashree Nikam
- Cinematography: Sachin Kumar
- Edited by: Jabeen Merchant
- Music by: Taufiq Qureshi
- Production company: Walkwater Media
- Release date: 4 September 2009
- Country: India
- Language: Marathi

Rita (Marathi: रीटा) is a Marathi language film directed by Renuka Shahane starring Pallavi Joshi, Jakie Shroff, Renuka Shahane, Dr. Mohan Agashe, Tushar Dalvi, Suhasini Mulay, Sai Tamhankar, Makarand Deshpande, Medha Jambotkar, Tucha Vaidya, Rajashree Nikam. The film was released on 4 September 2009. It is based on the book, Rita Welingkar, written by Shahane's mother, Shanta Gokhale.

== Cast ==
- Pallavi Joshi as Rita
- Jackie Shroff as Mr. Salvi
- Renuka Shahane as Saraswati
- Mohan Agashe as Shanks
- Tushar Dalvi as Sundaram
- Makrand Deshpande as Eric
- Suhasini Mulay as Nelly
- Gargi as Young Sherry
- Medha Jambotkar as Susheela
- Sai Tamhankar as Sangeeta
- Rucha Vaidya as Young Rita
- Pushkar Shrotri

== Reviews ==
Renuka Vyawahare of The Times of India wrote "Rita is one of those rare films which strikes an instant chord with you, making you deeply connect with it and its central character Rita Welingkar played impeccably well by Pallavi Joshi."
