= Pondicherry (film) =

2022 Indian drama film

- Film poster
- Directed by: Sachin Kundalkar
- Written by: Tejas Modak; Sachin Kudalkar
- Produced by: Akshay Bardapurkar; Neil Patel
- Starring: Sai Tamhankar; Vaibhav Tatwawadi; Amruta Khanvilkar; Neena Kulkarni
- Cinematography: Milind Jog
- Edited by: Abhijit Deshpande
- Music by: Music: Debarpito Saha; Songs: Abhay Jodhpurkar; Mohan Kanan; Lyrics: Tejas Modak; Sunil Suptankar.
- Production companies: Creative Vibe Productions; Planet Marathi
- Distributed by: A.P. Communications
- Release date: 25 February 2022
- Running time: 113 minutes
- Country: India
- Language: Marathi

Pondicherry is a 2022 Indian Marathi-language relationship drama film directed by Sachin Kundalkar and produced by Planet Marathi and Creative Vibe Productions shot entirely on smartphone. The film stars Sai Tamhankar, Vaibhav Tatwawadi and Amruta Khanvilkar are in lead roles. Pondicherry was scheduled to be theatrically release on 25 February 2022. Planet Marathi OTT is the official streaming partner of this film.

== Plot ==
Nikita and her eight-year-old son, Ishan, stay in an old family villa in Pondicherry that Nikita lets out as a homestay for travelers. Nikita is from Maharashtra and her Tamil husband Vishnu who worked in the Merchant Navy has been missing in a maritime accident. A broker specializing in getting people to sell old family homes – through deception or force – to hospitality companies arrives at Nikita's homestay, giving all their lives an unexpected twist.

== Cast ==
- Sai Tamhankar as Nikita
- Vaibhav Tatwawadi as Rohan
- Amruta Khanvilkar as Manasi
- Bhupendra Jadawat as Antonio
- Tanmay Kulkarni as Ishan
- Neena Kulkarni as Aai
- Mahesh Manjrekar
- Gaurav Ghatnekar

== Production ==
In January 2019, Manjrekar joined the cast. The film was entirely shot on iPhone with only 15 crew members.

== Soundtrack ==
The music for the movie was composed by Debarpito Saha, with songs featuring Abhay Jodhpurkar and Mohan Kanan. The lyrics were written by Tejas Modak and Sunil Suptankar.

Track list
No.	Title	Lyrics	Singer(s)	Length
1.	"Tu Jaa Theher"	Sunil Sukthankar	Mohan Kannan	3:07
2.	"Saavali"	Tejas Modak	Abhay Jodhpurkar	2:42
Total length:				5:49

== Reception ==
Mihir Bhange from The Times of India wrote "Pondicherry may not strike the perfect chords with regular viewers. But for those who follow global cinema, this film is a treat to watch". Nandini Ramnath from Scroll.in wrote "Sai Tamhankar, among the few actors who can effortlessly suggest enigma and reserve, is the most compelling member of the cast. Vaibhav Tatwawadi and Amruta Khanvilkar are saddled with uneven and implausible character graphs. Neena Kulkarni is a hoot as the scandal-mongering mother, but there’s nothing in her performance that we haven’t seen before".

== Accolades ==
Award	Year	Category	Recipient(s)	Result	Ref.
Fakt Marathi Cine Sanman	2022	Best Actress in a Lead Role	Sai Tamhankar	Nominated	
Filmfare Awards Marathi	2023	Best Film Critics'	Pondicherry	Nominated	
Filmfare Awards Marathi	2023	Best Actress	Sai Tamhankar	Nominated	
Filmfare Awards Marathi	2023	Best Actress Critics'	Sai Tamhankar	Won	
Filmfare Awards Marathi	2023	Best Supporting Actress	Amruta Khanvilkar	Nominated	
Filmfare Awards Marathi	2023	Best Story	Tejas Modak, Sunil Sukthankar	Nominated	
Filmfare Awards Marathi	2023	Best Production Design	Divya Goswami	Nominated	
Filmfare Awards Marathi	2023	Best Cinematographer	Milind Jog	Nominated	
Filmfare Awards Marathi	2023	Best Background Score	Debarpito Saha	Nominated	
Filmfare Awards Marathi	2023	Best Sound Design	Anita Kushwaha	Nominated	
Filmfare Awards Marathi	2023	Best Costume Design	Amit Divekar	Nominated	
Pravah Picture Puraskar	2022	Best Film	Pondicherry	Nominated	
Pravah Picture Puraskar	2022	Best Director	Sachin Kundalkar	Nominated	
Pravah Picture Puraskar	2022	Best Actress	Sai Tamhankar	Won	
Pravah Picture Puraskar	2022	Best Actor	Vaibhav Tatwawadi	Nominated	
Pravah Picture Puraskar	2022	Best Supporting Actress	Amruta Khanvilkar	Nominated	
Pravah Picture Puraskar	2022	Best Child Actor	Tanmay Kulkarni	Won	
Pravah Picture Puraskar	2022	Best Singer	Mohan Kannan	Nominated	
Pravah Picture Puraskar	2022	Best Background Music	Debarpito Saha	Nominated	
Pravah Picture Puraskar	2022	Best Dialogue	Tejas Modak, Sunil Sukthankar	Nominated	
Pravah Picture Puraskar	2022	Best Story	Tejas Modak, Sunil Sukthankar	Nominated	
Pravah Picture Puraskar	2022	Best Screenplay	Tejas Modak, Sunil Sukthankar	Nominated	
Pravah Picture Puraskar	2022	Best Sound Scheme	Anita Kushwaha	Nominated	
Pravah Picture Puraskar	2022	Best Costume	Amit Divekar	Nominated	
Pravah Picture Puraskar	2022	Best Cinematography	Milind Jog	Nominated	
Pravah Picture Puraskar	2022	Best Editor	Abhijit Deshpande	Won	
Planet Marathi Film and OTT Awards	2023	Best Art Direction	Divya Goswami	Won	
Maharashtra State Film Awards	2025	Best Film II	Pondicherry	Won	
Maharashtra State Film Awards	2025	Best Social Film	Pondicherry	Nominated	
Maharashtra State Film Awards	2025	Best Director II	Sachin Kundalkar	Won	
Maharashtra State Film Awards	2025	Best Social Film Director	Sachin Kundalkar	Nominated	
Maharashtra State Film Awards	2025	Best Screenplay	Tejas Modak, Sunil Sukthankar	Won	
Maharashtra State Film Awards	2025	Best Actor	Vaibhav Tatwawadi	Nominated	
Maharashtra State Film Awards	2025	Best Actress	Sai Tamhankar	Won	

== See also ==
List of films shot on mobile phones
