= Girlfriend (2019 film) =

2019 Marathi language film

- Theatrical release poster
- Directed by: Upendra Sidhaye
- Written by: Upendra Sidhaye
- Produced by: Anish Jog; Ranjit Gugle; Afeefa Suleman Nadiadwala
- Starring: Amey Wagh; Sai Tamhankar; Kavita Lad; Rasika Sunil
- Cinematography: Milind Jog
- Edited by: Faisal and Imran
- Music by: Saurabh Bhalerao
- Production companies: Huge Production; Pratishad Production; Triple Ace Entertainment
- Distributed by: AA Films
- Release date: 26 July 2019
- Country: India
- Language: Marathi

Girlfriend (Marathi: Preyasi) a 2019 Marathi language film is directorial debut of Upendra Sidhaye, starring Amey Wagh, Sai Tamhankar, Isha Keskar, Uday Nene, Yatin Karyekar and Kavita Lad. The film is produced by Anish Joag, Ranjit Gugle, Kaustubh Dhamane, Ameya Patil, Salil Milind Datar and Afeefa Nadiadwala, under the banner of Huge Production, Pratishad Production and Triple Ace Production. It was theatrically released on 26 July 2019.

== Plot Summary ==
The story revolves around Nachiket, a nerdy youngster who wants to get a girlfriend. He finds one in Alisha.

== Cast ==
- Amey Wagh as Nachiket Pradhan
- Sai Tamhankar as Alisha Nerurkar/Payal Mehta
- Kavita Lad as Nachiket's mother
- Yatin Karyekar as Nachiket's father
- Isha Keskar as Kaveri, Nachiket's friend's wife
- Uday Nene as Aditya, Nachiket's friend
- Rasika Sunil as Shweta, Nachiket's colleague
- Suyog Gorhe as Sandy, Nachiket's friend
- Sagar Deshmukh as Nachiket's Boss
- Pratyancha Narale as Baby

== Marketing and release ==
The film was released on 26 July 2019. For promotion of the film, Amey Wagh made a Facebook post asking for name for a girl. He later revealed a poster of the film and stated that the name was for the girlfriend in the movie. The title track for the film, "Nachya Got a Girlfriend" was released on 18 June 2018.

== Soundtrack ==
Girlfriend

Soundtrack album by Hrishikesh – Saurabh – Jasraj
- Released: 18 June 2019
- Recorded: 2019
- Studio: Dawn Studios, Pune
- Genre: Feature film soundtrack
- Length: 18:37
- Language: Marathi
- Label: Video Palace
External audio
- Audio Jukebox on YouTube

The soundtrack of the film is composed by Hrishikesh, Saurabh and Jasraj while lyrics are written by Kshitij Patwardhan. The chorus are by Darshana Jog, Amita Ghugari, Pranjali Barve, Bhagyashree Abhyankar, Poonam Godbole, Yash Gokhale, Hrishikesh Kelkar, Ajit Vispute, Saurabh Daftardar and Sandeep Ubale.

Track listing
No.	Title	Lyrics	Music	Singer(s)	Length
1.	"Nachya Got A Girlfriend"	Kshitij Patwardhan	Hrishikesh, Saurabh and Jasraj	Jasraj Joshi	4:10
2.	"Love Story"	Kshitij Patwardhan	Hrishikesh, Saurabh and Jasraj	Jasraj Joshi, Shruti Athavale	5:48
3.	"Kode Sope Thode"	Kshitij Patwardhan	Hrishikesh, Saurabh and Jasraj	Shruti Athavale	4:34
4.	"Querida Querido"	Kshitij Patwardhan, Jasraj Joshi	Hrishikesh, Saurabh and Jasraj	Shalmali Kholgade, Jasraj Joshi	4:04
Total length:					18:37
