= Sau Shashi Deodhar =

2014 Marathi-language film

- Directed by: Amol Shetge
- Produced by: Shilpa Shirodkar Ranjit; Kushna Shetty
- Starring: Sai Tamhankar; Ajinkya Deo; Tushar Dalvi
- Cinematography: Suresh Deshmane
- Edited by: Rajesh Rao
- Music by: Tubby Parik
- Release date: 21 February 2014
- Country: India
- Language: Marathi

Sau Shashi Deodhar is an Indian Marathi language film directed by Amol Shetge and produced by Shilpa Shirodkar Ranjit and Kushna Shetty. The film stars Sai Tamhankar, Ajinkya Deo and Tushar Dalvi. The film was released on 21 February 2014.

== Synopsis ==
Shubhada meets with an accident involving Dr. Ajinkya's car and loses her identity. She informs the police that she is Shashi Deodhar's wife. However, when police visit Shashi's home, they find out that he is an old man who is already married. When Shashi identifies Shubhada in hospital, he recalls her as one of his students. In the past, Shashi was an art teacher in Shubhada's school. Little Shubhada had a crush on him and used to go for personal coaching to his home in order to get more time with him. However, she found out that Shashi is married and used to idealize him due to his devoting family-man personality. In this chaos, a man named Thakur approaches the police claiming to be Shubhada's husband. Dr. Ajinkya now decides to take matters in his hands. He investigates everyone thoroughly and then calls everyone to announce the decision, where he publicly slaps Mr. Thakur. He then discloses that Mr. Thakur is Subhada's real husband, but due to his infertility, his father—Subhada's Father-in-law—raped her. This traumatic incident left her so broken that she ended up in accident. Due to memory loss, Shubhada picked up from her childhood memories and claimed Shashi as her husband. Thakur and his father are arrested.

== Cast ==
- Sai Tamhankar as Shubhada
- Ajinkya Deo as Dr Ajinkya Vartak
- Tushar Dalvi as Shashi Deodhar
- Shilpa Gandhi
- Avinash Kharshikar
- Aniket Kelkar
- Anoushka Ranjit
- Monalisa Bagal

== Soundtrack ==
Sau Shashi Deodhar

Soundtrack album by Tubby Parik
- Released: 2014
- Recorded: 2014
- Genre: Feature film soundtrack
- Length: 7:52
- Language: Marathi

Official audio
- Sau Shashi Deodhar – Full Album on YouTube

Track listing
No.	Title	Singer(s)	Length
1.	"Rang Tu"	Shankar Mahadevan	3:42
2.	"Hati Tuze"	Mahalakshmi Iyer	4:10
Total length:			7:52

== Critical response ==
Sau Shashi Deodhar received positive reviews from critics. Soumitra Pote of Maharashtra Times rated the film 3 out of 5 stars and wrote, "The planned journey has been completed perfectly by the director with the help of everyone. So he entertains well". The Times of India gave it 3.5 stars out of 5 and similarly found that, "Thrilling, well-crafted and disturbing at the same time, is 'Sau Shashi Deodhar' for you. It is perhaps the only film after 'Pune 52' in this genre that succeeds in playing mind games with the viewers and is a good watch for psychological thriller buffs". Divyamarathi wrote, " It presents the gruesome reality of oppression of women for the lamp of the race. A different topic has been presented before the society by taking care of the human mind". Loksatta wrote, "Complicated and forced to think about what would happen next, 'Mrs. Shashi Deodhar is a one time must watch movie".
