= Sanai Choughade =

- Theatrical release poster
- Directed by: Rajeev Patil
- Produced by: Deepti Shreyas Talpade
- Starring: Sai Tamhankar; Subodh Bhave; Shreyas Talpade; Tushar Dalvi; Santosh Juvekar
- Edited by: Rajesh Rao
- Music by: Avadhoot Gupte
- Release date: 20 June 2008
- Country: India
- Language: Marathi

Sanai Choughade is a 2008 Indian Marathi language film directed by Rajeev Patil and produced by Deepti Shreyas Talpade. The film stars Shreyas Talpade, Subodh Bhave, Sai Tamhankar, Tushar Dalvi, Santosh Juvekar. The film was theatrically released on 20 June 2008.

== Plot ==
Sayee, an orphan, is living with her cousin, Urmila and her husband Shrikant, a childless couple who belong to the upper strata of the society. Taking full responsibility as her guardians they set out to get her married, in the traditional Indian way. Although they have a love marriage, they are new to the circus of arranged marriage in which caste, creed and skin color are of prime importance. Kaande Pohe, a new way of matrimonial search, turns out to be the answer to Sayee's problems. Aditya, a prospective groom, is ready to marry her, but a thunderous revelation sends shock waves through everyone.

== Cast ==
- Shreyas Talpade as Aniket
- Subodh Bhave as Rahul Borgavkar
- Sai Tamhankar as Saee
- Santosh Juvekar as Aditya
- Shilpa Tulaskar as Urmila, Saee' sister
- Tushar Dalvi as Jijaji Shrikant
- Bharti Achrekar
- Chinmay Mandlekar as Amit
- Anita Date-Kelkar as Seema
- Dipti Ketkar as Ananya
- Vidyadhar Joshi as Dada, Amit's father
- Meghana Erande as Ketaki
- Shruti Marathe as Ashwini

== Soundtrack ==
The music is provided by Avadhoot Gupte.

=== Track listing ===
No.	Title	Performer(s)	Length
1.	"Sha Na na"	Avdhoot Gupte Janhavi Prabhu Arora	4:28
2.	"Kande Pohe"	Sunidhi Chauhan	5:18
3.	"Chandra Mi"	Avdhoot Gupte	3:18
