= Sridevi Prasanna =

- Theatrical release poster
- Original title: श्रीदेवी प्रसन्न
- Directed by: Vishal Modhave
- Written by: Aditi Moghe
- Starring: Sai Tamhankar; Siddharth Chandekar; Sulbha Arya; Sanjay Mone; Rasika Sunil
- Cinematography: Arjun Vishwas Sorte
- Edited by: Faisal Mahadik
- Music by: Amitraj
- Production companies: Tips Films; Trisha Studios
- Distributed by: AA Films
- Release date: 2 February 2024
- Country: India
- Language: Marathi

Sridevi Prasanna is a 2024 Indian Marathi-language drama film directed by Vishal Modhave, written by Aditi Moghe and produced by Tips Films and Trisha Studios. The film starring Sai Tamhankar and Siddharth Chandekar in the lead roles and Sulbha Arya, Sanjay Mone and Rasika Sunil in the supporting roles.

The film was theatrically released on 2 February 2024.

== Plot ==
Sridevi and Prasanna defy traditional notions of love and romance, forging a distinctive bond despite familial expectations.

== Cast ==
- Sai Tamhankar as Sridevi
- Siddharth Chandekar as Prasanna
- Siddharth Bodke as Rishikesh
- Rasika Sunil as Neerja
- Sulbha Arya as Sridevi's grandmother
- Sanjay Mone as Sridevi's father
- Sameer Khandekar as Sridevi's brother
- Shubhangi Gokhale
- Vandana Sardesai
- Aakanksha Gade
- Rammakant Daayama
- Rahul Pethe
- Pallavi Paranjape
- Pooja Wankhade
- Siddharth Mahashabde
- Jiyansh Parde

== Soundtrack ==
Sridevi Prasanna

Soundtrack album by Amitraj
- Released: 2024
- Recorded: 2024
- Venues: YRF Studios; RT Studios
- Genre: Feature film soundtrack
- Label: Tips Marathi

Music of the film is composed by Amitraj with lyrics are penned by Kshitij Patwardhan.

The Song Dil me baji guitar recreated by Amitraj, originally composed by Pritam. Songs choreography done by Pappu Maalu and Sagar das.

=== Track listing ===
Sridevi Prasanna
No.	Title	Lyrics	Music	Singer(s)	Length
1.	"Toch Aahe"	Kshitij Patwardhan	Amitraj	Harshavardhan Wavare & Aarya Ambekar
2.	"Dil me baji guitar"	Kshitij Patwardhan	Amitraj	Nakash Aziz, Kasturi Wavre
3.	"Asach Asel ka"	Kshitij Patwardhan	Amitraj	Aanandi Joshi (singer) & Harshavardhan Wavare
4.	"Ajun koni aahe ka"	Kshitij Patwardhan	Amitraj	Kunal Ganjawala, Kasturi Wavre
5.	"Harun gele"	Kshitij Patwardhan	Amitraj	Abhay Jodhpurkar

== Critical response ==
Prerana Jangam of Sakal awarded 4 stars out of 5 and suggests that the movie will appeal more to the younger generation but believes that its interesting story can entertain audiences of any age group. Harshada Bhirvandekar of Hindustan Times praised the film for its exceptional acting, particularly highlighting the performances of Siddharth Chandekar and Sai Tamhankar. In addition she added "They emphasize that the characters feel authentic and well-portrayed thanks to these actors." Kalpeshraj Kubal reviewed for The Times of India rated 3.0/5 and wrote "It will definitely tug your heart's (and guitar) strings."
