= Vazandar =

- Directed by: Sachin Kundalkar
- Screenplay by: Sachin Kundalkar
- Story by: Sachin Kundalkar
- Produced by: Vidhi Kasliwal
- Starring: Sai Tamhankar; Priya Bapat; Siddharth Chandekar; Chirag Patil
- Cinematography: Milind Jog
- Edited by: Gorakshanath
- Music by: Debarpito Saha
- Production company: Landmarc Films
- Release date: 11 November 2016
- Running time: 110 minutes
- Country: India
- Language: Marathi
- Budget: 5 cr.
- Box office: 4.50 cr.

Vazandar (Marathi: "वजनदार") is a 2016 Indian Marathi language slice of life film directed by Sachin Kundalkar and produced by Vidhi Kasliwal. The film stars Sai Tamhankar and Priya Bapat in lead roles. It was released on 11 November 2016.

== Cast ==
- Sai Tamhankar as Kaveri
- Priya Bapat as Pooja
- Siddharth Chandekar as Alok
- Chirag Patil as Omkar
- Sameer Dharmadhikari as Mike Sir (Gym Instructor)
- Aditi Deshpande as Maya (Pooja's Mother)
- Chetan Chitnis as Mohit (Filmmaker)
- Gaurav Ghatanekar as Dr. Milind Jog

== Soundtrack ==
Vazandar

Soundtrack album by Avinash-Vishwajeet
- Released: 25 October 2016
- Genre: Feature film soundtrack
- Length: 15:00
- Language: Marathi
- Label: Zee Music Company
External audio
- Audio Jukebox on YouTube

The soundtrack of Vazandar consists of four songs composed by Avinash-Vishwajeet and written by Omkar Kulkarni and Vishwajeet Joshi.

Tracklist
No.	Title	Lyrics	Singer(s)	Length
1.	"Golu Polu"	Omkar Kulkarni	Rohit Raut; Priya Bapat	03:54
2.	"Diet Diet"	Omkar Kulkarni	Madhura Kumbhar; Anita Date-Kelkar; Shikha Jain	03:57
3.	"Tu Tu Tana"	Vishwajeet Joshi	Shalmali Kholgade	03:45
4.	"Vazandar" (Mash Up)	Omkar Kulkarni; Vishwajeet Joshi	Rohit Raut, Priya Bapat, Madhura Kumbhar, Anita Date-Kelkar, Shikha Jain & Shalmali Kholgade	03:24
Total length:				15:00

== Release ==
Vazandar was released on 11 November 2016 with English subtitles in Maharashtra, Gujarat, Goa, Delhi, Karnataka, Andhra Pradesh and Telangana.

== Critical reception ==
Mihir Bhanage of The Times of India gave the film a rating of 3 out of 5 saying that, "Sachin Kundalkar’s latest offering has everything that you expect from it – aesthetic value, a slice-of-life story, balanced storytelling and good performances as well." Ganesh Matkari of Pune Mirror gave the film a rating of 3 out of 5 and said that, "Vazandar is meant to be a light comedy. It has a simple and straightforward message about inner beauty, which can resonate with anyone, and it has likable characters." Amruta Deshpande of Indian Nerve gave the film a rating of 3.5 out of 5 and said that, "This Marathi Movie Tackling Weight Loss Issues & Body Shaming Is Highly Relatable!" Abhay Salvi of Marathi Stars gave the film a rating of 3 out of 5 saying that, "Watch ‘Vazandar’ for three reasons Sai Tamhankar, Priya Bapat & the overall ‘Youthful’ flavor of the film." Ajay Kulye of Marathi Cineyug gave the film a rating of 2 out of 5 and said that, "Clichéd script and weak second half kills the movie experience. At the end, it is the under-cooked recipe which you might not enjoy." Keyur Seta of Cinestaan gave the film a rating of 3 out of 5 and said that, "Sachin Kundalkar deals with the serious issue of obesity in a heartwarming manner." Amol Parchure of Film Companion praised the concept of the film, performances of Sai Tamhankar & Priya Bapat, cinematography and the music of the film but found the second half of the film to be weak and felt that the film failed to reach the potential that it could have. This critic gave the film a rating of 3.5 out of 5.

== See also ==
- Highest grossing Marathi films
- List of most expensive Indian films
