= Pyaar Vali Love Story =

2014 Indian film by Sanjay Jadhav

- Film poster
- Directed by: Sanjay Jadhav
- Written by: Sanjay Jadhav; Aashish Pathre
- Produced by: Utpal Acharya; Inder Raj Kapoor; Rekha Joshi
- Starring: Swwapnil Joshi; Sai Tamhankar; Urmila Kanitkar; Sameer Dharmadhikari; Upendra Limaye
- Cinematography: Sanjay Jadhav
- Edited by: Apurva Motiwale; Ashish Mhatre
- Music by: Pankaj Padghan; Amitraj; Samir Saptiskar
- Production companies: Cinema Company India Pvt Ltd; Dreaming 24/7 Productions; STV Network & Suvidesh films
- Release date: 24 October 2014
- Running time: 133 minutes
- Country: India
- Language: Marathi
- Budget: ₹7.5 crore (US$780,000)
- Box office: ₹11.5 crore (US$1.2 million) (Lifetime)

Pyaar Vali Love Story (styled as: प्यार वाली Love Story) is a Marathi-language romantic film written and directed by Sanjay Jadhav. Starring Swwapnil Joshi and Sai Tamhankar in the lead roles, it also stars Upendra Limaye, Urmila Kothare, Sameer Dharmadhikari, Nagesh Bhosale and others. The plot of the film is set in the 1990s. The film was released in theatres on 24 October 2014 coinciding Diwali.

== Plot ==
Pyar Vali Love Story presents stories of two lovers, who were of different religions. It is a story of two friends-Kadar and Pashya. Pashya's brother Amar loves Kadar's sister Aliya. Things take a turn after the murder of Inspector Alam. Amar and Aliya face hurdles in their love story because of different religions and also when their brothers became enemies.

== Cast ==
- Swwapnil Joshi as Amar
- Sai Tamhankar as Aliya
- Urmilla Kothare as Nandini
- Upendra Limaye as Kadar
- Sameer Dharmadhikari as Pashya
- Nagesh Bhosale as Aliya's Father
- Ila Bhate as Aliya's mother
- Chinmay Mandlekar as Inspector Alam
- Jitendra Joshi
- Sushant Shelar, Adarsh Shinde in a song "Jahan Jaau"
- Pruthvik Pratap

== Soundtrack ==
No.	Title	Singer(s)
1	"Zara Zara"	Javed Ali & Sayali Pankaj
2	"Aali Lahar"	Ajit Parab & Sayali Pankaj
3	"Shutter Ka Tala"	Rohit Raut, Amitraj & Pankaj Padghan
4	"Zara Zara" (Female)	Sayali Pankaj
5	"Zara Zara" (Male)	Javed Ali
6	"Jahan Jaaun Tujhe Paaun"	Adarsh Shinde, Divya Kumar & Ronkini
7	"Baawari"	Jaideep Bagwadkar, Aanandi Joshi & Sandeep Patil
8	"Zara Zara" (Unplugged)	Javed Ali & Sayali Pankaj

== Box office ==
The movie collected around ₹1.15 crore (US$120,000) on first day, ₹1.05 crore (US$110,000) on second day and ₹1.30 crore (US$140,000) on third day, collecting ₹3.50 crore (US$370,000) in its opening weekend. It fared well on weekdays at the box office, and collected around ₹11 crore (US$1.1 million) nett. in 2 weeks.
