= Classmates (2015 film) =

- Theatrical release poster
- Directed by: Aditya Sarpotdar
- Written by: Kshitij Patwardhan
- Screenplay by: Kshitij Patwardhan; Sameer Vidhwans
- Story by: James Albert
- Produced by: Suresh Pai; Mediamonks
- Starring: Ankush Choudhary; Sai Tamhankar; Tushar Kamble; Sachit Patil; Sonalee Kulkarni; Siddharth Chandekar; Sushant Shelar; Suyash Tilak; Pallavi Patil; Tushar Pawar; Vinita Chavan
- Cinematography: Manoj Kumar Khatoi
- Edited by: Faisal Mahadik; Imran Mahadik
- Music by: Amitraj; Troy–Arif; Avinash–Vishwajeet; Pankaj Padghan
- Production companies: Mahalasa Entertainment; Media Monks
- Distributed by: Video Palace; S. K. Production Films
- Release date: 16 January 2015
- Running time: 175 minutes
- Country: India
- Language: Marathi
- Box office: est.₹21 crore

Classmates is a 2015 Indian Marathi-language romantic thriller film directed by Aditya Sarpotdar and starring Ankush Choudhary, Sai Tamhankar, Sachit Patil, Tushar Kamble, Sonalee Kulkarni, and Siddharth Chandekar. The film is a remake of the 2006 Malayalam film of the same name. It is the fourth highest grossing Marathi Film of the year 2015. And also one of the highest grossing Marathi Film of all time.

== Cast ==
- Ankush Choudhary as Satya
- Sai Tamhankar as Appu
- Sachit Patil as Rohit
- Sonalee Kulkarni as Aditi
- Sushant Shelar as Pratap
- Siddharth Chandekar as Ani
- Suyash Tilak as Amit
- Pallavi Patil as Heena
- Ramesh Deo as Samar Raje Nimbalkar
- Raju Pandit
- Sanjay Mone as Rohit's father
- Kishori Shahane as College Principal and Mother of Ani

== Plot ==
Satya is a last-year student and a college leader from the Yuva Shakti Party. Ani is a freshman who is Satya's friend. Aditi Nimbalkar is the niece of a politician. Appu is a rough girl and Satya's right hand. She loves Satya. Rohit is also a last year student and a swimmer. Ani has an ambition to build music section in college. In the beginning, Satya and Aditi hate each other but later, they fall in love with each other. During this, elections begin and Rohit decides that Aditi is going to oppose Satya in elections. The turning point of the story is Ani's death.

== Soundtrack ==
Classmates

Soundtrack album by Amit Raj, Troy-Arif, Avinash-Vishwajeet & Pankaj Padghan
- Released: 13 January 2015
- Genre: Feature film soundtrack
- Length: 32:12
- Label: Video Palace

Music of the film is composed by Amitraj, Troy Arif, Avinash-Vishwajeet and Pankaj Padghan with lyrics are penned by Mandar Cholkar, Satyajeet Ranade, Guru Thakur and Kshitij Patwardhan.

The first single from the film "Teri Meri Yaariyan" was released on YouTube on 7 November 2014. The second song "Bindhast Bedhadak" was released on 24 November 2014 on 9x Jhakaas.

=== Track listing ===
Classmates
No.	Title	Lyrics	Music	Singer(s)	Length
1.	"Teri Meri Yaariyan"	Mandar Cholkar	Amitraj	Harshavardhan Wavare & Amit Raj	4:11
2.	"Bindhast Bedhadak"	Satyajeet Ranade	Avinash-Vishwajeet	Ashish Sharma, Farhad Bhivandiwala & Hrishikesh Ranade	4:02
3.	"Roz Mala Visrun Me"	Guru Thakur	Amitraj	Bela Shende & Harshavardhan Wavare	3:42
4.	"Aala Re Raja"	Kshitij Patwardhan	Troy-Arif	Adarsh Shinde	3:37
5.	"Swapna Chalun Aale"	Kshitij Patwardhan	Pankaj Padghan	Sonu Nigam & Sayali Pankaj	3:45
6.	"Saang Na"	Kshitij Patwardhan	Troy-Arif	Shekhar Ravjiani	5:14
7.	"Teri Meri Yaariyan (Reprise)"	Mandar Cholkar	Amitraj	Harshavardhan Wavare & Amitraj	5:03
8.	"Roz Mala Visrun Me (Female Version)"	Guru Thakur	Amitraj	Bela Shende	2:23
9.	"Classical Classmates"	Instrumental	Avinash-Vishwajeet	Instrumental; Additional Vocals: Aanandi V. Joshi, Priyanka Barve & Vishwajeet Joshi	1:35
Total length:					32:12

== Reception ==
Mihir Bhanage of The Times of India opined that "On the whole, it wouldn’t be wrong to say that 2015 has started on a high note with the first two releases pulling crowd to theatres and living up to the expectations. We hope the trend continues and we have more gems to watch on the silver screen." Soumitra Pote, writing for the Maharashtra Times, wrote that "The most important thing is the artist. All the artists worked hard. Overall, this movie is made using all kinds of spices. Sufficient expenditure has been made for this. He dyes. But there is not much innovation in it. As Mahashi puts it, when you walk out of the theater, you feel like you have seen per worldliness" Loksatta wrote "All the artists have portrayed their personalities in a good way. Good acting is the strength of this film."
