= Maharashtra State Film Award for Best Director =

Annual award for Marathi cinema

- Awarded for: Award for excellence in direction
- Sponsored by: Ministry of Cultural Affairs (Maharashtra)
- First award: 1962
- Final award: 2023

The Maharashtra State Film Award for Best Director is presented annually at the Maharashtra State Film Awards to the best director in Marathi cinema film. The awards are managed directly by the Government of Maharashtra under the Ministry of Cultural Affairs, Maharashtra. The recipients are selected by a jury appointed by the state government.

The award is presented across three tiers: Director I, Director II, and Director III; following the same structure as the Best Film awards. The Director I award is renamed the Bhalji Pendharkar Award for Best Director, in honour of Bhalji Pendharkar. The Director II award is named the Raja Paranjape Award for Best Director, honouring Raja Paranjape. The Director III award is named the Raja Thakur Award for Best Director, in tribute to Raja Thakur.

== Achievement records ==
=== Multiple wins ===
Total Wins across all categories	Director
13	Rajdutt
7	Raja Thakur
6	Jabbar Patel; Sanjay Surkar; Sumitra Bhave–Sunil Sukthankar
5	Dada Kondke
4	Madhukar Pathak; Raja Paranjape; Anant Mane; Kamlakar Torne; Amol Palekar; Girish Ghanekar; Sachin Pilgaonkar; Chandrakant Kulkarni
3	Madhav Shinde; Babasaheb Fattelal; N. S. Vaidya; Paresh Mokashi
2	Vasant Joglekar; Vasant Painter; Murlidhar Kapadi; V.K. Naik; Bhaskar Jadhav; Shrabani Deodhar; Mahesh Kothare; Ajay Phansekar; Mahesh Manjrekar; Gajendra Ahire; Bipin Nadkarni; Rajiv Patil; Sachin Kundalkar; Paresh Mokashi; Shantanu Rode; Makarand Mane

Wins	Director I
8	Rajdutt
4	Raja Thakur; Sumitra Bhave–Sunil Sukthankar
3	Jabbar Patel; Sanjay Surkar
2	Madhukar Pathak

Wins	Director II
3	Raja Paranjape; Rajdutt; Kamlakar Torne; Sachin Pilgaonkar; Chandrakant Kulkarni
2	Madhukar Pathak; Anant Mane; Raja Thakur; V.K. Naik; Amol Palekar; Bhaskar Jadhav; Ajay Phansekar; Rajiv Patil; Sachin Kundalkar

Wins	Director III
3	Madhav Shinde; Dada Kondke; Girish Ghanekar
2	Anant Mane; Rajdutt; Murlidhar Kapadi; Jabbar Patel; Babasaheb Fattelal; N. S. Vaidya; Sanjay Surkar; Mahesh Kothare; Shantanu Rode

=== Other achievement records ===
- Rajdutt holds the record for the most wins overall with 13 awards, including the most wins in the Director I category with 8. He also holds the distinction of winning the Director I award five consecutive times from 1982 to 1986, the longest winning streak in any single category. Raja Thakur won the same category three times in a row from 1970 to 1972.
- Several directors have won the same category in two consecutive years: Rajdutt (1968–1969), Raja Paranjape (1962–1963), Anant Mane (1965–1966), Madhav Shinde (1969–1970), Kamlakar Torne (1977–1978), and Sachin Pilgaonkar (1989–1990).
- Rajdutt is the only director to have won two categories at the same ceremony on more than one occasion, winning Director I and Director II in 1984, and Director I and Director III in 1986. Other directors to have won two categories at the same ceremony are Sumitra Bhave–Sunil Sukthankar (2002) and Gajendra Ahire (2003).
- Smita Talwalkar, Shrabani Deodhar, Veena Lokur, and Sumitra Bhave (of the duo Sumitra Bhave–Sunil Sukthankar) are the only female directors to have won the award in any of the three categories.
- The award has been tied on only two occasions: in 1964 between Ram Gabale and Raja Paranjape in the Director I category, and in 2011 between Umesh Vinayak Kulkarni and Ravi Jadhav in the Director II category.

== Winners ==
Year, directors and their associated films
Year	Director I (Bhalji Pendharkar Award for Best Director)	Director II (Raja Paranjape Award for Best Director)	Director III (Raja Thakur Award for Best Director)	Refs.
1962	Madhukar Pathak (Prapanch)	Raja Paranjape (Suvasini)	Anant Mane (Shahir Parshuram)	
1963	Raja Thakur (Rangalya Ratri Asha)	Raja Paranjape (Haa Maza Marg Ekla)	Chandrashekhar (Phakira)	
1964	Ram Gabale (Chhota Jawan)	Raja Thakur (Pahu Re Kiti Vaat)	Madhav Shinde (Thoratanchi Kamala)	
1964	Raja Paranjape (Pathlaag)	Raja Thakur (Pahu Re Kiti Vaat)	Madhav Shinde (Thoratanchi Kamala)	
1965	Shantaram Athavale (Vavtal)	Anant Mane (Sawaal Majha Aika!)	Not awarded	
1966	Bhalji Pendharkar (Sadhi Mansa)	Anant Mane (Kela Ishara Jata Jata)	Vasant Joglekar (Shevatcha Malusara)	
1967	Madhukar Pathak (Santh Wahate Krushnamai)	Raja Paranjape (Kaka Mala Vachva)	Chandrawadan (Swapna Tech Lochani)	
1968	Rajdutt (Gharchi Rani)	Kamlakar Torne (Aamhi Jato Amuchya Gava)	Raja Thakur (Ekti)	
1969	Rajdutt (Aparadh)	Madhukar Pathak (Mukkam Post Dhebewadi)	Madhav Shinde (Dharmakanya)	
1970	Raja Thakur (Mumbaicha Jawai)	Vasant Painter (Warnecha Wagh)	Madhav Shinde (Laxmanresha)	
1971	Raja Thakur (Gharkul)	Satyadev Dubey (Shantata! Court Chalu Aahe)	Govind Kulkarni (Songadya)	
1972-73	Raja Thakur (Jawai Vikat Ghene Aahe)	Rajdutt (Bholibhabdi)	Dada Kondke (Andhla Marto Dola)	
1974	Vasant Painter (Sugandhi Katta)	Datta Mane (Kartiki)	Murlidhar Kapadi (Ashi Hi Sataryachi Tarha)	
1975	Dada Kondke (Pandu Havaldar)	Jabbar Patel (Samna)	Dattatray Kulkarni (Bayanno Navre Sambhala)	
1976	Babasaheb Fattelal (Choricha Mamla)	Dada Kondke (Tumcha Aamcha Jamala)	Anant Mane (Pahuni)	
1977	V. Ravindra (Farari)	Kamlakar Torne (Bala Gau Kashi Angai)	Murlidhar Kapadi (Naav Motha Lakshan Khota)	
1978	Rajdutt (Devaki Nandan Gopala)	Kamlakar Torne (Bhairu Pehelwan Ki Jai)	Jabbar Patel (Jait Re Jait)	
1979	Vasant Joglekar (Janaki)	Rajdutt (Ashtavinayak)	Dada Kondke (Bot Lavin Tithe Gudgulya)	
1980	Nachiket Patwardhan (22 June 1897)	Jabbar Patel (Sinhasan)	Babasaheb Fattelal (Paij)	
1981	Jabbar Patel (Umbartha)	V.K. Naik (Gondhalat Gondhal)	Amol Palekar (Akrit)	
1982	Rajdutt & Arvind Deshpande (Shapit)	Ravi Namade (Ek Daav Bhutacha)	Dada Kondke (Aali Angawar)	
1983	Rajdutt (Raghu Maina)	V.K. Naik (Gupchup Gupchup)	Kamlakar Torne (Thorli Jau)	
1984	Rajdutt (Hech Maze Maher)	Rajdutt (Mumbaicha Faujdar)	Satish Randive (Bahurupi)	
1985	Rajdutt (Ardhangi)	Bhaskar Jadhav (Deva Shappath Khara Sangen)	Babasaheb Fattelal (Streedhan)	
1986	Rajdutt (Pudhcha Paaul)	Damu Kenkre (Tuzya Vachun Karmena)	Rajdutt (Aaj Zale Mukta Me)	
1987	Girish Ghanekar (Prem Karuya Khullam Khulla)	Sachin Pilgaonkar (Gammat Jammat)	N. S. Vaidya (Khatyal Sasu Nathal Soon)	
1988	Sachin Pilgaonkar (Ashi Hi Banwa Banwi)	N. S. Vaidya (Nashibwan)	Girish Ghanekar (Rangat Sangat)	
1989	Kanchan Nayak (Kalat Nakalat)	Sachin Pilgaonkar (Atmavishwas)	Purushottam Berde (Hamaal De Dhamaal)	
1990	Ramakant Kavthekar (Aaghat)	Sachin Pilgaonkar (Eka Peksha Ek)	N. S. Vaidya (Kuldeepak)	
1991	Sanjay Surkar (Chaukat Raja)	Pradip Berlekar (Vedh)	Sanjiv Naik (Anpekshit)	
1992	Jabbar Patel (Ek Hota Vidushak)	Sanjay Surkar (Apli Mansa)	Girish Ghanekar (Vaajva Re Vaajva)	
1993	Sanjay Rawal (Vazir)	Smita Talwalkar (Savat Mazi Ladki)	Shrabani Deodhar (Lapandav)	
1994	Jabbar Patel (Mukta)	Madhukar Pathak (Varsa Laxmicha)	Mahesh Kothare (Majha Chakula)	
1995	Sumitra Bhave–Sunil Sukthankar (Doghi)	Amol Palekar (Bangarwadi)	Amol Shedge (Aboli)	
1996	Sanjay Surkar (Raosaheb)	Bhaskar Jadhav (Putravati)	K. Radhaswami (Suna Yeti Ghara)	
1997	Yashwant Bhalkar (Paij Lagnachi)	Shrabani Deodhar (Sarkarnama)	Girish Ghanekar (Navsacha Por)	
1998	Sanjay Surkar (Tu Tithe Mee)	Ajay Phansekar (Ratra Aarambh)	Subhash Phadke (Hasari)	
1999	Rajeev Khandagale (Gabhara)	Chandrakant Kulkarni (Bindhaast)	Sanjay Surkar (Gharabaher)	
2000	Amol Palekar (Dhyaas Parva)	Mahesh Manjrekar (Astitva)	Satish Rajwade (Mrugjal)	
2001	Millind Ukley (Devki)	Ajay Phansekar (Ek Hoti Vadi)	Rajdutt (Zanzavat)	
2002	Sumitra Bhave–Sunil Sukthankar (Dahavi Fa)	Sumitra Bhave–Sunil Sukthankar (Vastupurush)	Chandrakant Kulkarni (Bhet)	
2003	Sandeep Sawant (Shwaas)	Gajendra Ahire (Not Only Mrs. Raut)	Gajendra Ahire (Vitthal Vitthal)	
2004	Bipin Nadkarni (Uttarayan)	Rajiv Patil (Savarkhed Ek Gaon)	Sanjay Surkar (Saatchya Aat Gharat)	
2005	Nishikant Kamat (Dombivli Fast)	Chandrakant Kulkarni (Kaydyacha Bola)	Mahesh Kothare (Khabardar)	
2006	Sumitra Bhave–Sunil Sukthankar (Nital)	Sachin Kundalkar (Restaurant)	Rajendra Talik (Savali)	
2007	Mangesh Hadawale (Tingya)	Bipin Nadkarni (Aevdhese Aabhal)	Sanjay Jadhav (Checkmate)	
2008	Paresh Mokashi (Harishchandrachi Factory)	Rajiv Patil (Jogwa)	Rajendra Patil (Dhudgus)	
2009	Santosh Manjrekar (Me Shivajiraje Bhosale Boltoy)	Nitin Nandan (Jhing Chik Jhing)	Sumitra Bhave–Sunil Sukthankar (Ek Cup Chya)	
2010	Anant Mahadevan (Mee Sindhutai Sapkal)	Amol Palekar (Dhoosar)	Veena Lokur (Platform)	
2011	Sujay Dahake (Shala)	Umesh Vinayak Kulkarni (Deool)	Kiran Yadnopavit (Taryanche Bait)	
2011	Sujay Dahake (Shala)	Ravi Jadhav (Balgandharva)	Kiran Yadnopavit (Taryanche Bait)	
2012	Mahesh Manjrekar (Kaksparsh)	Chandrakant Kulkarni (Tukaram)	Nitin Chandrakant Desai (Ajintha)	
2013	Nitin Dixit (Avatarachi Goshta)	Nitish Bharadwaj (Pitruroon)	Shantanu Rode (Jayjaykar)	
2014	Shrihari Sathe (Ek Hazarachi Note)	Paresh Mokashi (Elizabeth Ekadashi)	Om Raut (Lokmanya: Ek Yugpurush)	
2015	Makarand Mane (Ringan)	Sameer Vidwans (Double Seat)	Chandrakant Kanse (Dagadi Chawl)	
2016	Sumitra Bhave–Sunil Sukthankar (Kaasav)	Sandeep Patil (Dashakriya)	Rajesh Mapuskar (Ventilator)	
2017	Sagar Vanjari (Redu)	Varun Narvekar (Muramba)	Manoj Kadam (Kshitij Ek Horizon)	
2018	Shivaji Lotan Patil (Bhonga)	Milind Lele (Bandishala)	Sachin Jadhav, Nachiket Waikar (Tendlya)	
2019	Ajit Wadikar (Y)	Sameer Joshi (Miss U Mister)	Vikram Phadnis (Smile Please)	
2020	Nipun Dharmadhikari (Me Vasantrao)	Makarand Mane (Baaplyok)	Shantanu Rode (Goshta Eka Paithanichi)	
2021	Mangesh Joshi (Karkhanisanchi Waari)	Vikram Patwardhan (Frame)	Nikhil Mahajan (Godavari)	
2022	Pravin Tarde (Dharmaveer)	Sachin Kundalkar (Pondicherry)	Abhijeet Deshpande (Har Har Mahadev)	
2023	Shrikant Bhide (Bhera)	Mahesh Limaye (Jaggu Ani Juliet)	Sudhakar Reddy Yakkanti (Naal 2)	
2024	Anil Bhalerao (Chabila)	Navjyot Bandiwadekar (Gharat Ganpati)	Paresh Mokashi (Nach Ga Ghuma)	
