= 61st Maharashtra State Film Awards =

Award ceremony for Indian films of 2023

- Awarded for: Best of Marathi cinema in 2023
- Awarded by: Government of Maharashtra
- Announced on: 5 August 2025
- Site: NSCI Dome, Worli, Mumbai
- Hosted by: Prasad Oak and Amruta Subhash
- Official website: www.filmcitymumbai.org

Highlights
- Best Feature Film: Bhera
- Most awards: Gypsy (8)

The 61st Maharashtra State Film Awards, presented by the Government of Maharashtra celebrated excellence in Marathi cinema by honoring the best films released in 2023.

The nominations were announced on 27 June 2025 by the Minister of Cultural Affairs, Ashish Shelar, who also revealed the winners in the technical and child artist categories. The award ceremony took place on 5 August 2025.

The Maharashtra Film, Theatre and Cultural Development Corporation had invited submissions for the awards, with the original deadline set for 16 April 2024 but later extending it to 31 May 2024. In total, 49 entries certified by the Central Board of Film Certification (CBFC) released between 1 January and 31 December 2023, were submitted for the preliminary round of evaluation.

The 60th and 61st ceremonies were held together, with honors in the special categories presented jointly for both years. Anupam Kher received the Raj Kapoor Award, Kajol was honored with the Raj Kapoor Special Contribution Award, Mahesh Manjrekar received the V. Shantaram Lifetime Achievement Award, Mukta Barve was presented the V. Shantaram Special Contribution Award, and Bhimrao Panchale was honored with the Lata Mangeshkar Award.

At the 61st ceremony, Gypsy won the most awards, 8 in total, including Best Film, Best Director, Best Rural Film, and Best Rural Film Director. It was followed by Jaggu Ani Juliet and Naal 2 with 7 awards each.

== Jury members ==
• Vijay Patkar	• Bhargavi Chirmule
• Prasanna Karkhanis	• Sanjay Dharankar
• Kshitija Khandagale	• Atul Deshpande
• Anjali Khobrekar	• Atul Shidhaye
• Ganesh Pandit	• Arun Mhatre
• Ashish Keskar	• Vitthal Patil
• Archana Patkar	• Rajan Bane
• Amit Bhandari

== Awards and nominations ==
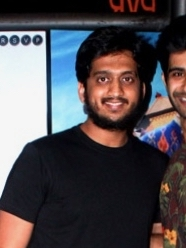
Amey Wagh, Best Actor

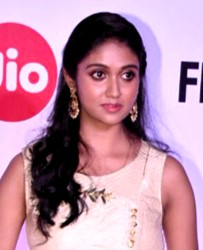
Rinku Rajguru, Best Actress

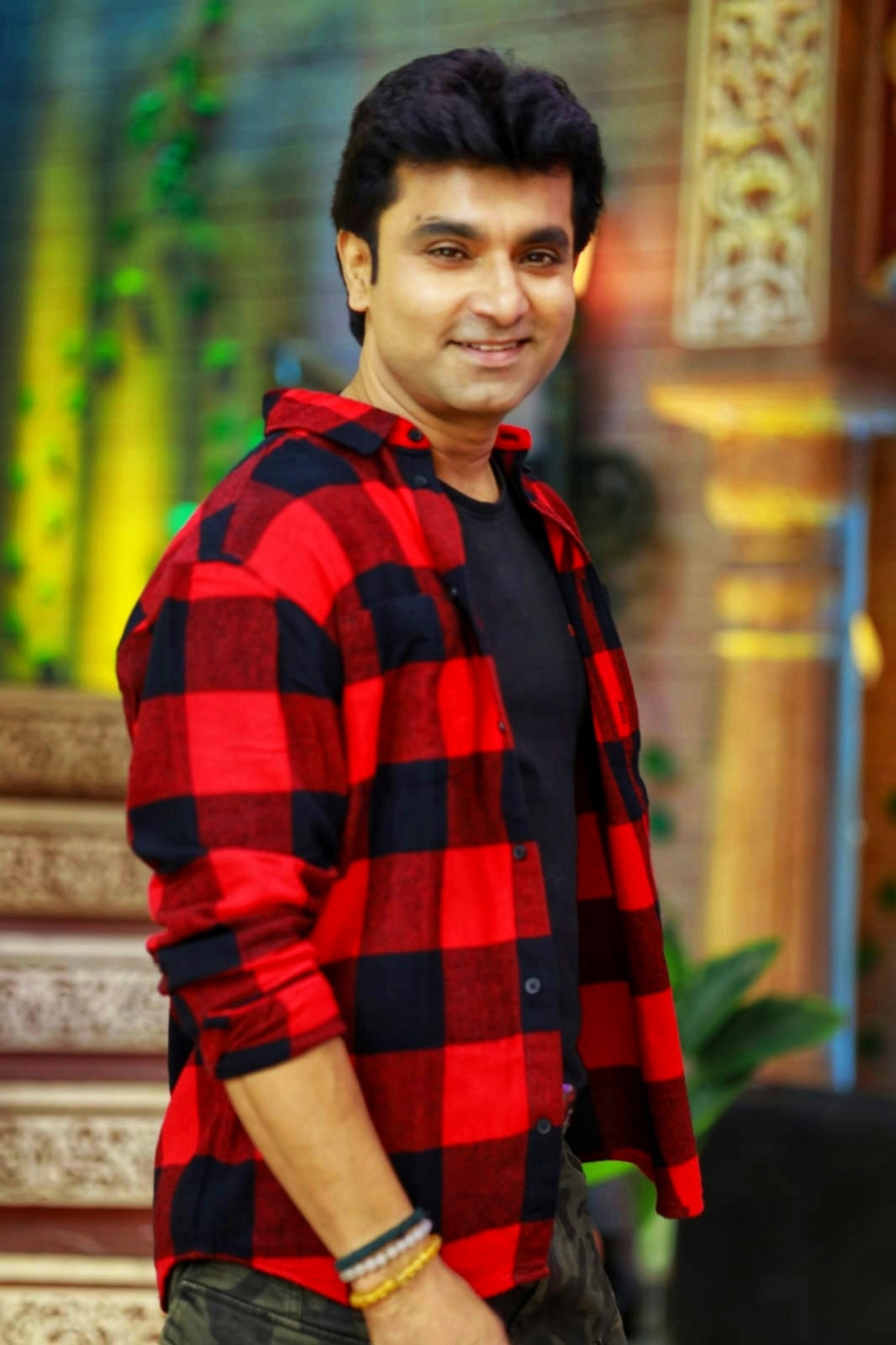
Santosh Juvekar, Best Actor

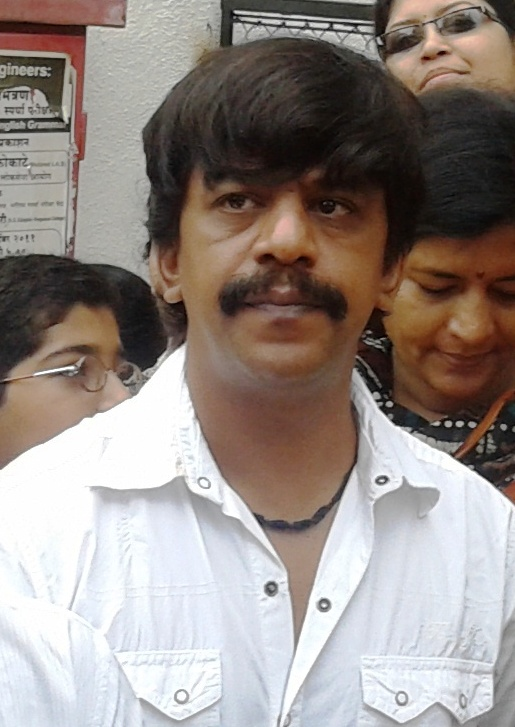
Upendra Limaye, Best Comedian Male

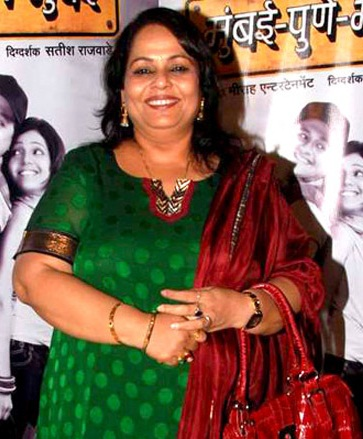
Nirmiti Sawant, Best Comedian Female

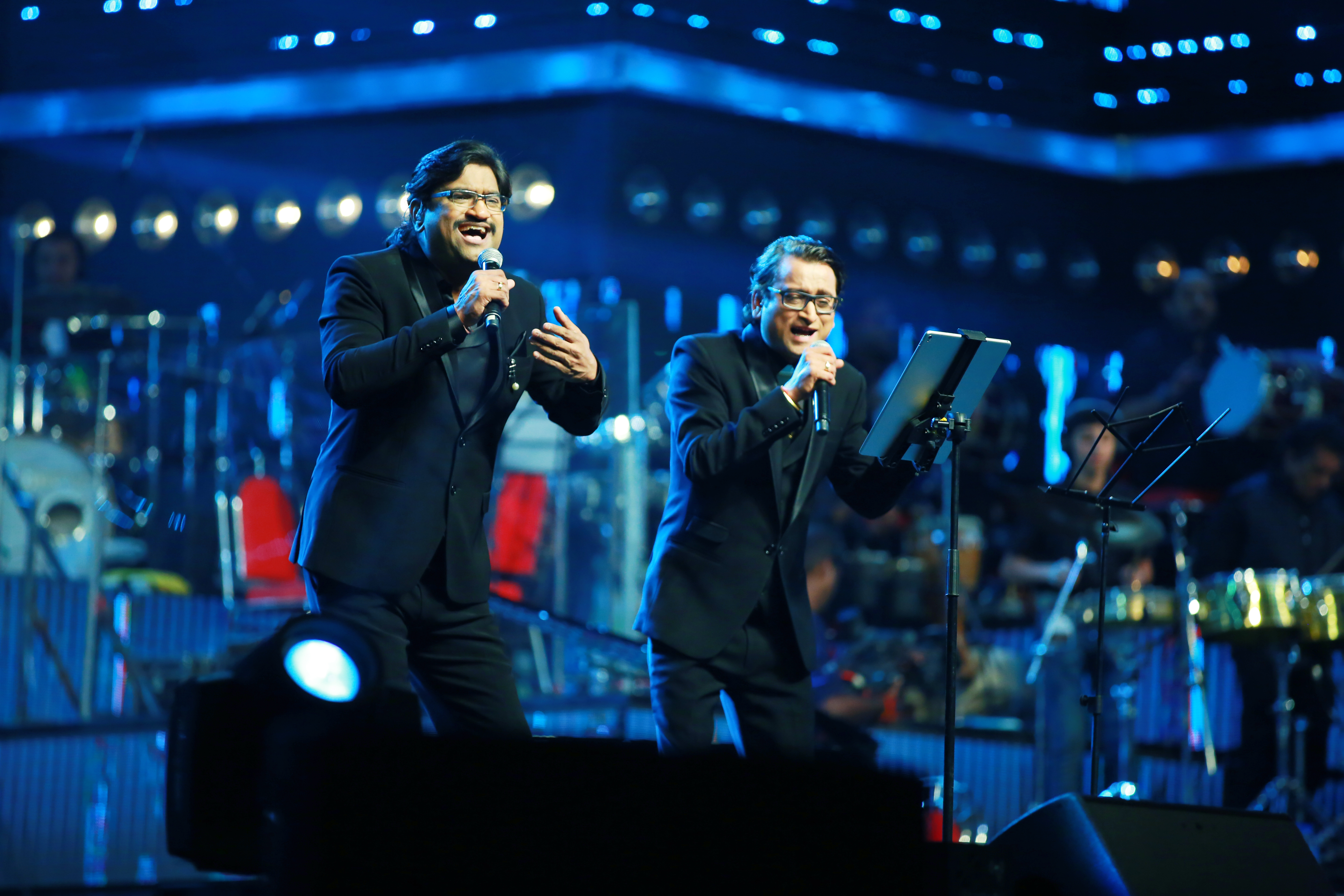
Ajay-Atul, Best Music Director

=== Film and director awards ===
Best Film I	Best Director I
Bhera	Shrikant Prabhakar – Bhera
Best Film II	Best Director II
Jaggu Ani Juliet	Mahesh Limaye – Jaggu Ani Juliet
Best Film III	Best Director III
Naal 2	Sudhakar Reddy Yakkanti – Naal 2
Best Rural Film	Best Rural Film Director
Gypsy	Sashi Khandare – Gypsy
Best Social Film	Best Social Film Director
Asha; Aatmapamphlet; Gypsy; Naal 2; Raundal; Terav; Jaggu Ani Juliet; Bhera; Asha; Jhimma 2; Alibaba Aani Chalishitale Chor	Deepak Balu Patil – Asha; Ashish Bende – Aatmapamphlet; Sashi Khandare – Gypsy; Sudhakar Reddy Yakkanti – Naal 2; Gajanan Padol – Raundal; Harish Ithape – Terav; Mahesh Limaye – Jaggu Ani Juliet; Shrikant Prabhakar – Bhera; Deepak Patil – Asha; Hemant Dhome – Jhimma 2; Aditya Ingale – Alibaba Aani Chalishitale Chor

=== Acting awards ===
Best Actor (Shahu Modak and Sivaji Ganesan Award)	Best Actress (Smita Patil Award)
Amey Wagh – Jaggu Ani Juliet as Jaggu Dada; Shridhar Watsar – Sshort and Ssweet; Siddharth Jadhav – Hajar Vela Shole Pahilela Manus	Rinku Rajguru – Asha as Malti; Vaidehi Parshurami – Jaggu Ani Juliet as Juliet; Kiran Khoje – Terav
Best Supporting Actor (Chintamanrao Kolhatkar Award)	Best Supporting Actress (Shanta Hublikar and Hansa Wadkar Award)
Santosh Juvekar – Ravrambha as Jalindar; Pravin Dalimbkar – Ghar Banduk Biryani as Gura; Subodh Bhave – Alibaba Ani Chalishitale Chor as Parag	Usha Naik – Asha as Rakhma Mai; Ashvini Mahangade – Maharashtra Shahir as Radhabai Sable; Suhas Joshi – Jhimma 2 as Indumati Karnik (Indu)
Best Comedian Male (Damuanna Malvankar Award)	Best Comedian Female (Ratnamala Award)
Upendra Limaye – Jaggu Ani Juliet; Anand Ingale – Alibaba Ani Chalishitale Chor as Varun; Girish Kulkarni – Ekda Yeun Tar Bagha as Shravan Dada	Nirmiti Sawant – Jhimma 2 as Nirmala Konde-Patil; Namrata Sambherao – Ekda Yeun Tar Bagha as Ashwini; Tejaswini Lonari – Aflatoon as Alia Sawant
Best Child Artist (Gajanan Jagirdar Award)
Kabir Khandare – Gypsy; Treesha Thosar – Naal 2

=== Debut awards ===
Best Debut Film Production	Best Debut Direction
Gypsy; Hajar Vela Shole Pahilela Manus; Sshort and Ssweet	Ashish Bende – Aatmapamphlet; Harish Ithape – Terav; Gajanan Padol – Raundal
Best Debut Actor (Kashinath Ghanekar Award)	Best Debut Actress (Ranjana Deshmukh Award)
Deepak Joil – Bhera as Vishnu; Shahu Tukaram – Gypsy; Jayesh Thakkar – Aflatoon as Manav	Shraddha Khanolkar – Bhera as Anibai; Gauri Deshpande – Shyamchi Aai as Yashoda; Gayatri Bansode – Gypsy

=== Music awards ===
Best Playback Singer Male	Best Playback Singer Female
Mohit Chauhan – Ghar Banduk Biryani for "Ghar Banduk Biryani"; Swapnil Bandodkar – Phulrani for "Tujhya Sobatine"; Ajay Gogavale – Maharashtra Shahir for "Paul Thakle Nahi"	Rucha Bondre – Shyamchi Aai for "Bharjari Ga Pitambar"; Shreya Ghoshal – Jhimma 2 for "Rang Ola"; Vaishali Mhade – Raundal for "Man Baharla Ga"
Best Lyrics	Best Background Score
Vaibhav Deshmukh – Naal 2 for "Bhingori"; Vinayak Pawar – TDM for "Ek Phool"; Kshitij Patwardhan – Jhimma 2 for "Rang Ola"	Advait Nemlekar – Naal 2; Ashish Jha – Asha; Virendra Latankar – Terav
Best Music Director (Arun Paudwal Award)	Best Choreographer
Ajay-Atul – Maharashtra Shahir; Virendra Latankar – Terav; AV Prafullchandra – Naal 2	Rahul Thombre, Sanjeev Hovaladar – Jaggu Ani Juliet for "Tu Bi Aan Mi Bi"; Ranju Varghese – Aflatoon for "Maka Naka"; Rahul Thombre, Sanjeev Hovaladar – Jaggu Ani Juliet for "Bhavi Amdar"

=== Writing awards ===
Best Story (Madhusudan Kalelkar Award)	Best Screenplay
Sudhakar Reddy Yakkanti – Naal 2; Paresh Mokashi – Aatmapamphlet; Shashikant Khandare – Gypsy	Shashikant Khandare – Gypsy; Shyam Pethkar – Terav; Paresh Mokashi – Aatmapamphlet
Best Dialogue
Ambar Hadap, Ganesh Pandit – Jaggu Ani Juliet; Vivek Bele – Alibaba Ani Chalishitale Chor; Paresh Mokashi – Aatmapamphlet

=== Technical awards ===
Best Costume Design	Best Make-up
Manasi Attarde – Jaggu Ani Juliet	Hamid Sheikh, Manali Bhosale – Hajar Vela Shole Pahilela Manus
Best Cinematography (Pandurang Naik Award)	Best Editing
Pravin Sonavane – Gypsy	Akshay Shinde – Gypsy
Best Sound Mixing	Best Sound Editing
Vikas Khandare – Gypsy	Kunal Lolsure – Shyamchi Aai
Best Art Direction (Saheb Mama aka Fateh Lal Award)
Amey Bhalerao – Shyamchi Aai

=== Special awards ===
Special Encouragement Award
- Bhargav Jagtap – Naal 2
Jury's Special Award
- Shyamchi Aai

== Superlatives ==
Multiple wins
Awards	Film
8	Gypsy
7	Jaggu Ani Juliet
7	Naal 2
5	Shyamchi Aai
4	Bhera
4	Asha
1	Jhimma 2
1	Aatmapamphlet
1	Ghar Banduk Biryani
1	Maharashtra Shahir
1	Hajar Vela Shole Pahilela Manus
