= Maharashtra State Film Award for Best Supporting Actress =

Indian award for best supporting actress

- Native name: Shanta Hublikar and Hansa Wadkar Award for Best Supporting Actress
- Awarded for: Best performance by an actress in a supporting role
- Sponsored by: Ministry of Cultural Affairs (Maharashtra)
- Reward: ₹50,000
- First award: 1962
- Final award: 2024

Highlights
- First winner: Kusum Deshpande, Prapanch (1962)

The Maharashtra State Film Award for Best Supporting Actress is an honour presented annually at the Maharashtra State Film Awards to recognize an actress for the best performance in a supporting role in a Marathi film. Established in 1962, the recipients are selected by a jury constituted each year by the Government of Maharashtra. Over the course of 62 award ceremonies, accounting for ties and repeat winners, the award has been presented to 54 different actors. The award was later renamed the Shanta Hublikar and Hansa Wadkar Award for Best Supporting Actress, in honour of Shanta Hublikar and Hansa Wadkar, one of the most celebrated actresses of Indian and Marathi cinema. Recipients receive a statuette and a cash prize of ₹50000.

== Achievement records ==
=== Multiple wins ===
Individuals with two or more Best Supporting Actress awards:

| Wins | Actress |
|---|---|
| 3 | Uttara Baokar; Usha Naik |
| 2 | Indira Chitnis; Leela Gandhi; Daya Dongre; Sulabha Deshpande; Deepa Parab; Reema Lagoo; Mrunmayee Deshpande |

- Usha Naik and Uttara Baokar hold the record for the most wins, with three awards each. Naik is also the only actress to have won the award across three different decades; in 1979, 2000, and 2023.
- Indira Chitnis remains the only recipient to win the award in consecutive years, achieving back-to-back victories in 1963 and 1964.
- The award has resulted in a tie on eight occasions. Notably, in 1995 and 1998, both actresses shared the award for performances in the same films, Doghi and Satvapariksha, respectively.

== Winners and nominees ==
List of award recipients, showing the year, role(s) and film(s)
| Year | Photos of winners | Recipient(s) | Role(s) | Work(s) | Refs. |
|---|---|---|---|---|---|
| 1962 | | Kusum Deshpande | Paru's sister-in-law | Prapanch | |
| 1963 | | Indira Chitnis | Mangal's mother | Garibagharchi Lek | |
| 1964 | | Indira Chitnis | Atyasaheb | Thoratanchi Kamla | |
| 1965 | | Shanta Tambe | Bal's wife | Sawaal Majha Aika! | |
| 1966 | | Usha Chavan | Shevanti | Kela Ishara Jata Jata | |
| 1967 | | Sulochana Latkar | Tulsibai | Sant Gora Kumbhar | |
| 1968 | | Surekha | | Ektee | |
| 1969 | | Hansa Wadkar | Parvati Bhatikar | Dharmakanya | |
| 1969 | | Indrani Mukherjee | Asawari | Aparadh | |
| 1970 | | Durga Khote | Aai | Dhartichi Lekara | |
| 1971 | | Jayshree Gadkar | Mrs. Deshpande | Gharkul | |
| 1972 | Not awarded | | | | |
| 1973 | Not awarded | | | | |
| 1974 | | Leela Gandhi | | Kartiki | |
| 1975 | | Jayshree T. | | Bayanno Navre Sambhala | |
| 1976 | | Padma Chavan | | Ya Sukhano Ya | |
| 1977 | | Ratnamala | Sundarabai | Ram Ram Gangaram | |
| 1978 | | Asha Kale | Vachhi | Sasurvashin | |
| 1979 | | Usha Naik | Ratnawali | Haldi Kunku | |
| 1980 | | Leela Gandhi | Aai | Paij | |
| 1981 | | Chitra Palekar | Ruhibai | Akriet | |
| 1982 | | Daya Dongre | Nita Bai | Maaybaap | |
| 1983 | | Priya Tendulkar | Namita | Thorli Jau | |
| 1984 | | Sulabha Deshpande | Ganga Maushi | Hech Mazhe Maher | |
| 1985 | | Bharati Achrekar | Sai Aatya | Ardhangi | |
| 1986 | | Ashalata Wabgaonkar | Mai | Pudhcha Paool | |
| 1987 | | Daya Dongre | Dayabai Ragde | Khatyal Sasu Nathal Soon | |
| 1988 | | Usha Nadkarni | Bairubai | Nashibwaan | |
| 1989 | | Neelkanti Patekar | Rajni Tendulkar / Aarti Mangalkar | Aatmavishwas | |
| 1990 | | Asha Patil | | Thamb Thamb Jau Nako Lamb | |
| 1991 | | Sulabha Deshpande | Durga Maushi | Chaukat Raja | |
| 1992 | | Saroj Kothiwan | Laxmibai | Vaat Pahate Punvechi | |
| 1993 | | Pallavi Ranade | Mugdha | Lapandav | |
| 1994 | | Charusheela Sable | Pare | Bhasma | |
| 1995 | | Uttara Baokar | Aai | Doghi | |
| 1995 | | Renuka Daftardar | Gauri | Doghi | |
| 1996 | | Madhu Kambikar | Raosaheb's wife | Raosaheb | |
| 1996 | | Smita Talwalkar | Doctor Didi | Putravati | |
| 1997 | | Prateeksha Lonkar | Suchitra Patwardhan | Sarkarnama | |
| 1997 | | Manasi Magikar | | Sakharpuda | |
| 1998 | | Smita Jaykar | Kamini Deshmukh | Satvapariksha | |
| 1998 | | Resham Tipnis | Menka / Meera | Satvapariksha | |
| 1999 | | Sukanya Kulkarni | Kamla | Ghe Bharari | |
| 1999 | | Jyoti Chandekar | Amma | Gabhara | |
| 2000 | | Usha Naik | Paro Akka | Barkha Satarkar | |
| 2001 | Not Awarded | | | | |
| 2002 | | Uttara Baokar | Saraswati Deshpande | Vastupurush | |
| 2003 | Not Awarded | | | | |
| 2004 | | Deepa Parab | Janhavi Panse | Chakwa | |
| 2005 | | Deepali Bhosle-Sayed | Sayali | Pailteer | |
| 2006 | | Reema Lagoo | Ramabai Shirodkar | Savalee | |
| 2006 | | Uttara Baokar | Padmakka | Restaurant | |
| 2007 | | Madhavi Juvekar | Tingya's mother | Tingya | |
| 2008 | | Deepa Parab | Gauri | Urus | |
| 2008 | | Amita Khopkar | Shanti Kamble | Joshi Ki Kamble? | |
| 2009 | | Suchitra Bandekar | Sumitra Dinkar Bhosale | Mi Shivajiraje Bhosale Boltoy! | |
| 2009 | | Reema Lagoo | Nandini's Mother | Agnidivya | |
| 2010 | | Urmilla Kothare | Yashoda | Mala Aai Vhhaychy! | |
| 2011 | | Suhita Thatte | Manda Pandit | Sadarakshanaay | |
| 2012 | | Mrunmayee Deshpande | Kusum Jagtap | Mokala Shwaas | |
| 2013 | | Sai Tamhankar | Shirin Ghatge | Duniyadari | |
| 2014 | | Shruti Marathe | Parvatibai | Rama Madhav | |
| 2015 | | Prarthana Behere | Avani | Mitwaa | |
| 2016 | | Ashwini Giri | Sharada's mother | Chitthi | |
| 2017 | | Sharvani Pillai | Revati Vaidya | Asehi Ekada Vhave | |
| 2018 | | Chhaya Kadam | Chandrakka | Nude | |
| 2019 | | Nandita Patkar | Anandi | Baba | |
| 2020 | | Prema Sakhardande | More Aaji | Funral | |
| 2020 | | Neeta Shende | Aai | Baaplyok | |
| 2020 | | Smita Tambe | Savita | Bittersweet | |
| 2021 | | Hemangi Kavi | Meena | Tich Shahar Hona | |
| 2021 | | Kshitee Jog | Meeta Jahagirdar | Jhimma | |
| 2021 | | Sheetal Pathak | | Janani | |
| 2022 | | Mrunmayee Deshpande | Damayanti (Dolly) Daulatrao Deshmane | Chandramukhi | |
| 2022 | | Snehal Tarde | Anita Birje | Dharmaveer | |
| 2022 | | Kshitee Jog | Sunny | Vaidehi | |
| 2023 | | Usha Naik | Rakhma Mai | Asha | |
| 2023 | | Ashvini Mahangade | Radhabai Sable | Maharashtra Shahir | |
| 2023 | | Suhas Joshi | Indumati Karnik (Indu) | Jhimma 2 | |
| 2024 | | Namrata Sambherao | Asha | Nach Ga Ghuma | |
| 2024 | | Sushma Deshpande | Maai Gharat | Gharat Ganpati | |
| 2024 | | Kshitee Jog | Jayashree | Fussclass Dabhade | |
