= Maharashtra State Film Award for Best Second Film =

Indian film award

- Native name: Baburao Painter Award for Best Film
- Awarded for: Best film in Marathi cinema
- Sponsored by: Ministry of Cultural Affairs (Maharashtra)
- First award: 1962
- Final award: 2023
- Most recent winner: Jaggu Ani Juliet (2023)

Highlights
- First winner: Suvaasini (1962)

The Maharashtra State Film Award for Best Second Film is presented annually by the Department of Cultural Affairs, Government of Maharashtra, to recognise the second-best film in Marathi cinema. It is one of the most prestigious honours in the Marathi film industry and is presented during the Maharashtra State Film Awards ceremony. The award was first presented in 1962 and was later renamed the Baburao Painter Award for Best Film. The recipients are selected by a jury appointed by the state government.

The films of directors Raja Paranjape, Kamlakar Torne and Sachin Pilgaonkar have received the award most often, with three wins each. Paranjape's and Torne's winning films were in consecutive years (1962–1963) and (1977–1978) respectively, as were Pilgaonkar's (1989–1990). Films directed by Rajdutt and Chandrakant Kulkarni have each won the award three times, though not in consecutive years.

Films directed by Anant Mane won the award twice, including in two consecutive years. Madhukar Pathak, Jabbar Patel, V. K. Naik, Bhaskar Jadhav, Amol Palekar, Ajay Phansekar, Rajiv Patil and Sachin Kundalkar have each won the award on two occasions. Smita Talwalkar was the first female director whose film won the award.

== Winners ==
List of films, showing the year and director(s)
Year	Film(s)	Director(s)	Refs.
1962	Suvaasini	Raja Paranjape	
1963	Ha Maaza Marg Ekala	Raja Paranjape	
1964	Pahu Re Kiti Vaat	Raja Thakur	
1965	Sawaal Majha Aika!	Anant Mane	
1966	Kela Ishaara Jaata Jaata	Anant Mane	
1967	Kaka Mala Vachva	Raja Paranjape	
1968	Aamhi Jato Amuchya Gava	Kamlakar Torne	
1969	Mukkam Post Dhebewadi	Madhukar Pathak	
1970	Warnecha Wagh	Vasant Painter	
1971	Shantata! Court Chalu Aahe	Satyadev Dubey	
1972	Bholibhadi	Rajdutt	
1973	No award		
1974	Kartiki	Datta Mane	
1975	Samna	Jabbar Patel	
1976	Tumcha Aamcha Jamala	Dada Kondke	
1977	Bala Gau Kashi Angai	Kamlakar Torne	
1978	Bhairu Pehelwan Ki Jai	Kamlakar Torne	
1979	Ashtavinayak	Rajdutt	
1980	Sinhasan	Jabbar Patel	
1981	Gondhalat Gondhal	V.K. Naik	
1982	Ek Daav Bhutacha	Ravi Namade	
1983	Gupchup Gupchup	V.K. Naik	
1984	Mumbaicha Faujdar	Rajdutt	
1985	Deva Shappath Khara Sangen	Bhaskar Jadhav	
1986	Tuzya Vachun Karmena	Damu Kenkre	
1987	Gammat Jammat	Sachin Pilgaonkar	
1988	Nashibwan	N. S. Vaidya	
1989	Aatmavishwas	Sachin Pilgaonkar	
1990	Eka Peksha Ek	Sachin Pilgaonkar	
1991	Vedh	Pradip Berlekar	
1992	Aapli Mansa	Sanjay Surkar	
1993	Savat Mazi Ladki	Smita Talwalkar	
1994	Varsa Laxmicha	Madhukar Pathak	
1995	Bangarwadi	Amol Palekar	
1996	Putravati	Bhaskar Jadhav	
1997	Sarkarnama	Shrabani Deodhar	
1998	Ratra Aarambh	Ajay Phansekar	
1999	Bindhaast	Chandrakant Kulkarni	
2000	Astitva	Mahesh Manjrekar	
2001	Ek Hoti Vadi	Ajay Phansekar	
2002	Vastupurush	Sumitra Bhave–Sunil Sukthankar	
2003	Not Only Mrs. Raut	Gajendra Ahire	
2004	Savarkhed Ek Gaon	Rajiv Patil	
2005	Kaydyacha Bola	Chandrakant Kulkarni	
2006	Restaurant	Sachin Kundalkar	
2007	Aevdhese Aabhal	Bipin Nadkarni	
2008	Jogwa	Rajiv Patil	
2009	Jhing Chik Jhing	Nitin Nandan	
2010	Dhoosar	Amol Palekar	
2011	Deool	Umesh Vinayak Kulkarni	
2011	Balgandharva	Ravi Jadhav	
2012	Tukaram	Chandrakant Kulkarni	
2013	Pitruroon	Nitish Bharadwaj	
2014	Elizabeth Ekadashi	Paresh Mokashi	
2015	Double Seat	Sameer Vidwans	
2016	Dashakriya	Sandeep Patil	
2017	Muramba	Varun Narvekar	
2018	Bandishala	Milind Lele	
2019	Miss U Mister	Sameer Joshi	
2020	Baaplyok	Makarand Mane	
2021	Frame	Vikram Patwardhan	
2022	Pondicherry	Sachin Kundalkar	
2023	Jaggu Ani Juliet	Mahesh Limaye	
2024	Gharat Ganpati	Navjyot Bandiwadekar	
