= Maharashtra State Film Award for Best Third Film =

Indian film award

- Native name: Master Vinayak Award for Best Film
- Awarded for: Best film in Marathi cinema
- Sponsored by: Ministry of Cultural Affairs (Maharashtra)
- First award: 1962
- Final award: 2023
- Most recent winner: Naal 2 (2023)

Highlights
- First winner: Shahir Parshuram (1962)

The Maharashtra State Film Award for Best Third Film is presented annually by the Department of Cultural Affairs, Government of Maharashtra, to recognise the third-best film in Marathi cinema. It is one of the most prestigious honours in the Marathi film industry and is presented as part of the Maharashtra State Film Awards ceremony. The award was first presented in 1962 and was later renamed the Master Vinayak Award for Best Film. The recipients are selected by a jury appointed by the state government.

Films directed by Dada Kondke and Girish Ghanekar have each won the award three times. Films directed by Anant Mane, Murlidhar Kapadi, Babasaheb Phattelal, Rajdutt, N. S. Vaidya, Mahesh Kothare, Sanjay Surkar, and Shantanu Rode have each won the award twice. Madhav Shinde’s films won the award in consecutive years (1969 and 1970). Lapandav directed by Shrabani Deodhar was the first by a female director to win in this category. The award was not presented in 1965.

== Winners ==
List of films, showing the year and director(s)
Year	Film(s)	Director(s)	Refs.
1962	Shahir Parshuram	Anant Mane	
1963	Phakira	Chandrashekhar	
1964	Thoratanchi Kamala	Madhu Shinde	
1965	Not awarded		
1966	Shevatcha Malusara	Vasant Joglekar	
1967	Swapna Tech Lochani	Chandrawadan	
1968	Ekti	Raja Thakur	
1969	Dharmakanya	Madhav Shinde	
1970	Laxman Resha	Madhav Shinde	
1971	Donhi Gharcha Pahuna	Gajanan Jagirdar	
1971	Songadya	Govind Kulkarni	
1972-73	Andhala Marto Dola	Dada Kondke	
1974	Ashi Hi Sataryachi Tarha	Murlidhar Kapadi	
1975	Bayanno Navre Sambhala	Dattatray Kulkarni	
1976	Pahuni	Anant Mane	
1977	Naav Motha Lakshan Khota	Murlidhar Kapadi	
1978	Jait Re Jait	Jabbar Patel	
1979	Bot Lavin Tithe Gudgulya	Dada Kondke	
1980	Paij	Babasaheb Phattelal	
1981	Akrit	Amol Palekar	
1982	Aali Angawar	Dada Kondke	
1983	Thorli Jau	Kamlakar Torne	
1984	Bahurupi	Satish Randive	
1985	Stridhan	Babasaheb Phattelal	
1986	Aaj Zale Mukta Me	Rajdutt	
1987	Khatyal Sasu Nathal Soon	N. S. Vaidya	
1988	Rangat Sangat	Girish Ghanekar	
1989	Hamaal De Dhamaal	Purushottam Berde	
1990	Kooldeepak	N. S. Vaidya	
1991	Anapekshit	Sanjeev Naik	
1992	Vaajva Re Vaajva	Girish Ghanekar	
1993	Lapandav	Shrabani Deodhar	
1994	Majha Chakula	Mahesh Kothare	
1995	Aboli	Amol Shedge	
1996	Suna Yeti Ghara	K. Radhaswami	
1997	Navsacha Por	Girish Ghanekar	
1998	Hasri	Subhash Phadke	
1999	Gharabaher	Sanjay Surkar	
2000	Mrugjal	Satish Rajwade	
2001	Zanzavat	Rajdutt	
2002	Bhet	Chandrakant Kulkarni	
2003	Vitthal Vitthal	Gajendra Ahire	
2004	Saatchya Aat Gharat	Sanjay Surkar	
2005	Khabardar	Mahesh Kothare	
2006	Savali	Rajendra Talik	
2007	Checkmate	Sanjay Jadhav	
2008	Dhudgus	Rajendra Patil	
2009	Ek Cup Chya	Sumitra Bhave–Sunil Sukthankar	
2010	Platform	Veena Lokur	
2011	Taryanche Bait	Kiran Yadnopavit	
2012	Ajintha	Nitin Chandrakant Desai	
2013	Jaijaikar	Shantanu Rode	
2014	Lokmanya: Ek Yugpurush	Om Raut	
2015	Dagadi Chawl	Chandrakant Kanse	
2016	Ventilator	Rajesh Mapuskar	
2017	Kshitij Ek Horizon	Manoj Kadam	
2018	Tendlya	Sachin Jadhav, Nachiket Waikar	
2019	Smile Please	Vikram Phadnis	
2020	Goshta Eka Paithanichi	Shantanu Rode	
2021	Godavari	Nikhil Mahajan	
2022	Har Har Mahadev	Abhijeet Deshpande	
2023	Naal 2	Sudhakar Reddy Yakkanti	
2024	Nach Ga Ghuma	Paresh Mokashi	
