= Maharashtra State Film Award for Best Child Artist =

Indian film award

- Awarded for: Best performance by child actor in a Marathi film
- First award: 1963
- Final award: 2024

Highlights
- Total awarded: 61
- First winner: Sachin Pilgaonkar

Maharashtra State Film Award for Best Child Artist is an award, begun in 1963, presented annually at the Maharashtra State Film Awards of India to the child artist for best performance in a Marathi cinema film. The awardees are decided by a jury constituted every year. The inaugural award was named as "Gajanan Jagirdar Award for Best Supporting Actor" and was awarded to Sachin Pilgaonkar for the film Ha Maza Marg Ekala.

== Winners ==
Year	Recipient(s)	Film	Ref.
1963	Sachin Pilgaonkar	Ha Maza Marg Ekala	
1964	Mahesh Kothare	Chhota Jawan	
1965	Manika Mane	Sawaal Majha Aika!	
1984	Baby Kalpana	Bahurupi	
1985	Milind Holankar	Streedhan	
1986	Baby Neela	Pudhcha Paool	
1987	Master Ninad	Prem Karuya Khullam Khulla	
1988	Master Ninad	Nashibwan	
1989	Mrunmayee Chandorkar	Kalat Nakalat	
1990	Aradhita	Kuldeepak	
1991	Rajasi Behere	Chaukat Raja	
1992	Aseem Deshpande	Ek Hota Vidushak	
1993	Sai Deodhar	Lapandav	
1994	Adinath Kothare	Majha Chakula	
1995	Supriya Nimkar	Oti Khana Narlachi	
1996	Kalpak Joshi	Putravati	
1997	Rui Jadhav	Navsacha Por	
1998	Manasi Bhatawdekar	Hasari	
1999	Nimish Kadhare	Lekroo	
2000	Pushkar Jog	Raju	
2001	Anurag Worlikar	Devki	
2002	Apurva Koregave	Bhet	
2003	Ashwin Chitale	Shwaas	
2004	Not awarded		
2005	Saksham Kulkarni	Pak Pak Pakaak	
2006	Anurag Worlikar	Mission Champion	
2007	Sharad Goekar	Tingya	
2008	Kaumudi Walekar	Tujhya Majhyat	
2009	Chinmay Kambli	Jhing Chik Jhing	
2010	Machindra Gadkar	Champions	
2010	Vivek Chabukswar	Baboo Band Baaja	
2011	Ishan Tambe	Taryanche Bait	
2012	Hansraj Jagtap	Dhag	
2013	Rohit Utekar	Tapaal	
2013	Tejashree Walawalkar	Maat	
2014	Ashutosh Gaikwad	Kaakan	
2015	Rinku Rajguru	Sairat	
2015	Sahil Joshi	Ringan	
2015	Vedashree Mahajan	The Silence	
2016	Aarya Jadhav	Dashakriya	
2016	Onkar Ghadi	Kaasav	
2017	Sahil Joshi	Aa Bb Kk	
2017	Maithili Patwardhan	Pipsi	
2018	Shrinivas Pokale	Naal	
2018	Aman Kamble	Tendlya	
2019	Aryan Menghaji	Baba	
2020	Anish Gosavi	Tak Tak	
2021	Aryan Menghaji	Baalbhaarti	
2022	Shrinivas Pokale	Chhumantar	
2022	Arnav Deshpande	Amhi Butterfly	
2023	Treesha Thosar	Naal 2	
2023	Kabir Khandare	Gypsy	
2024	Dhanashri Bhosle	Savitrichya Leki	
2024	Drushti More	Savitrichya Leki	
2024	Rasika Khandagale	Savitrichya Leki	
2024	Ejal Kalikuri	Savitrichya Leki	

== Multiple wins ==
Individuals with two or more Best child artist awards:

Wins	Recipients
2	Shrinivas Pokale; Anurag Worlikar; Sahil Joshi; Aryan Menghaji; Master Ninad

== See also ==
- Maharashtra State Film Awards
- Maharashtra State Film Award for Best Director
