= Maharashtra State Film Award for Best Cinematography =

Indian film award

- Awarded for: Best cinematography in a Marathi film
- Reward: ₹100,000 (US$1,100)
- First award: 1962
- Final award: 2024

Highlights
- Total awarded: 61
- First winner: K. B. Kamat
- Last winner: Mahesh Limaye; Mahesh Aney

The Maharashtra State Film Award for Best Cinematography is an award, begun in 1962, presented annually at the Maharashtra State Film Awards of India to an actor for best performance in a Marathi cinema. The recipient is chosen by a jury constituted every year. The name is announced by the Minister for Cultural Affairs and receives the award from the Chief Minister.

== Winners ==
Year	Recipient(s)	Film	Ref.
1962	K. B. Kamat	Prapanch	
1963	Arvind Lad	Prem Andhala Asta	
1964	Datta Gorle	Pathlaag	
1965	Arvind Lad	Vavtal	
1966	Arvind Lad	Sadhi Mansa	
1967	E. Mohammad	Suranga Mhantyat Mala	
1968	Ratnakar Lad	Aamhi Jato Amuchya Gava	
1969	Datta Gorle	Aparadh	
1970	Arvind Lad	Mumbaicha Jawai	
1970	Vasant Shinde	Warnecha Wagh	
1971	Datta Gorle	Dev Manoos	
1972-73	Ratnakar Lad	Anolkhi	
1974	E. Mohammad	Sugandhi Katta	
1975	Suryakant Lavande	Samna	
1975	Girish Karve	Bayanno Navre Sambhala	
1976	E. Mohammad	Choricha Mamla	
1976	Manohar Acharya	Ha Khel Sawalyancha	
1977	Maanu Kumbhar	Soyrik	
1977	Manohar Acharya	Farari	
1978	Suryakant Lavande	Sasurvashin	
1978	Pratap Dave	Paradh	
1979	S. Gokul	Sobati	
1979	Datta Gorle	Sunbai Oti Bharun Ja	
1980	Suryakant Lavande	Sinhasan	
1980	Govind Nihalani	Zakol	
1981	Girish Karve	Hich Khari Daulat	
1981	S. D. Devdhar	Nagin	
1982	Ishan Arya	Shapit	
1982	S. Gokul	Laxmichi Paule	
1983	Ratnakar Lad	Thorli Jau	
1983	Suresh Udale	Thinagi	
1984	Debu Deodhar	Hech Maze Maher	
1984	Tyagraj Pendharkar	Chavhata	
1985	Suryakant Lavande	Ardhangi	
1985	V. Bargir	Gad Jejuri Jejuri	
1986	Ishan Arya	Aaj Zale Mukt Me	
1987	Suryakant Lavande	Gammat Jammat	
1988	Vasant Shinde	Bandiwan Mi Ya Sansari	
1988	Manohar Acharya	Bandiwan Mi Ya Sansari	
1989	V. Keshav	Nivdung	
1990	Suryakant Lavande	Ek Ratra Mantarleli	
1991	Nandu Patil	Vedh	
1992	Charudatta Dukhande	Nishpaap	
1993	Suryakant Lavande	Kunku	
1994	Harish Joshi	Yadnya	
1994	Ram Allam	Yadnya	
1995	Debu Deodhar	Bangarwadi	
1996	Adeep Tandon	Raosaheb	
1997	Prakash Jadhav	Paij Lagnachi	
1998	Sharad Chavan	Andhala Sakshidar	
1999	Sameer Athalye	Bindhaast	
2000	Debu Deodhar	Dhyaas Parva	
2001	B. Laxman	Ek Hoti Vadi	
2002	Sanjay Memane	Vastupurush	
2003	Suresh Deshmane	Bapu Biru Vategaonkar	
2004	Sameer Athalye	Aamhi Asu Ladke	
2005	Sanjay Jadhav	Pak Pak Pakaak	
2006	Milind Jog	Restaurant	
2007	Sanjay Jadhav	Checkmate	
2008	Sanjay Memane	Gho Mala Asla Hava	
2008	Chandrashekhar Iyer	Tya Ratri Paus Hota	
2009	Sudhir Palsane	Vihir	
2010	Debu Deodhar	Mani Mangalsutra	
2010	Satish Sahastrabuddhe	Mani Mangalsutra	
2011	Mahesh Limaye	Balgandharva	
2012	Rajan Kothari	Tukaram	
2013	Avinash Arun	Vees Mhanje Vees	
2014	Devendra Golatkar	Nagrik	
2015	Abhijit Abde	Ringan	
2016	Amalendu Chaudhary	Cycle	
2017	Archana Borhade	Idak - The Goat	
2018	Sudhakar Reddy Yakkanti	Naal	
2019	Karan B. Rawat	Panghrun	
2020	Abhimanyu Dange	Me Vasantrao	
2021	Ranjit Mane	Potra	
2022	Abhijeet Chaudhary	4 Blind Men	
2022	Omkar Barve	4 Blind Men	
2022	Priyashankar Ghosh	Hya Goshtila Navacha Nahi	
2023	Pravin Sonavane	Gypsy	
2024	Mahesh Limaye	Phullwanti	
2024	Mahesh Aney	Swargandharva Sudhir Phadke	

== Multiple wins ==
Individuals with two or more Best Editing awards:

Wins	Actress
7	Suryakant Lavande
4	Debu Deodhar; Arvind Lad; Datta Gorle
3	Ratnakar Lad; E. Mohammad; Manohar Acharya
2	Sameer Athalye; Ishan Arya; Sanjay Jadhav; Vasant Shinde; Mahesh Limaye; Sanjay Memane; Girish Karve
