= Maharashtra State Film Award for Best Rural Film =

Indian film award

- Native name: Dada Kondke Award for Best Film
- Awarded for: Best Rural Film in Marathi cinema
- Sponsored by: Ministry of Cultural Affairs (Maharashtra)
- First award: 1993
- Final award: 2023
- Most recent winner: Gypsy (2023)

Highlights
- First winner: Sai Baba (1993)

The Maharashtra State Film Award for Best Rural Film is presented annually at the Maharashtra State Film Awards to the best rural film in Marathi cinema. The awards are managed directly by the Government of Maharashtra under the department of Ministry of Cultural Affairs. The category recognizes Marathi-language films that authentically portray village life, agrarian themes, and the social realities of rural Maharashtra. The Best Rural Film award was first presented in 1993, thirty years after the inaugural Maharashtra State Film Awards ceremony held in 1963. The category was later renamed the Dada Kondke Award for Best Film, in honour of Dada Kondke.

== Winners ==
List of films, showing the year and director(s)
Year	Film(s)	Director(s)	Refs.
1993	Sai Baba	Babasaheb S. Fattelal	
1998	Satva Pariksha	Ramesh Salgaonkar	
1999	Maherchi Pahuni	Prakash Hilage	
2000	Barkha Satarkar	Abhay Kirti	
2001	Tambvyacha Vishnubala	Pitambar Kale	
2003	Bapu Biru Vategaonkar	Pitambar Kale	
2004	Pandhar	Gajendra Ahire	
2005	Kunku Zale Vairi	Nagesh Darak	
2006	Balirajacha Rajya Yeu De	Satish Randive	
2007	Tingya	Mangesh Hadawale	
2008	Gho Mala Asla Hava	Sumitra Bhave–Sunil Sukthankar	
2009	Agnidivya	Ajit Shirole	
2010	Baboo Band Baaja	Rajesh Pinjani	
2011	Jan Gan Man	Ajit Abhyankar	
2012	Dhag	Shivaji Lotan Patil	
2013	72 Miles	Rajiv Patil	
2014	Khwada	Bhaurao Karhade	
2015	Rangaa Patangaa	Prasad Namjoshi	
2016	Bandookya	Rahul Chaudhari	
2017	Idak: The Goat	Deepak Gawade	
2018	Bhonga	Shivaji Lotan Patil	
2019	Taj Mahal	Niyaj Mujawar	
2020	Sumi	Amol Gole	
2021	Ye Re Ye Re Pausa	Shafaq Khan	
2022	Gaabh	Anup Jatratkar	
2023	Gypsy	Shashi Khandare	
2024	Navardev Bsc. Agri	Ram Khatmode	
