= Bhera (film) =

2025 Indian Marathi-language film

- Theatrical release poster
- Directed by: Shrikant Prabhakar
- Written by: Story: Prasad Khanolkar; Screenplay and Dialogues: Prasad Khanolkar; Shrikant Prabhakar
- Starring: Deepak Joil; Shraddha Khanolkar
- Cinematography: Sameer Bhaskar
- Edited by: Smita Phadke
- Music by: Pradyumna Chaware; Pranav Jantikar
- Production company: Shri Vaij-Prabha Chitra
- Release dates: January 2024 (Pune International Film Festival); 21 March 2025
- Running time: 134 minutes
- Country: India
- Language: Marathi (Malvani)

Bhera (transl. The Deaf) is a 2024 Indian Marathi-language drama film directed by Shrikant Prabhakar and produced under the banner Shri Vaij-Prabha Chitra. Set against the backdrop of the COVID-19 pandemic in a remote Konkan village, the film portrays a touching tale of loneliness, love, and resilience through the intertwined lives of two marginalized individuals. It is based on the short story Sakaav by Prasad Khanolkar and is notable for being the first feature film entirely made in the Malvani dialect of Marathi.

The film was officially selected for several film festivals, including the 77th Cannes Film Festival.

== Cast ==
- Deepak Joil as Vishnu
- Shraddha Khanolkar as Anibai
- Akanksha Khot as Rekha
- Pramod Koyande as Dada Sarpanch
- Anand Pandav as Factory Boy
- Vivekanand Valke as Mama
- Gaurav Raul
- Shrikant Prabhakar
- Prajakta Nerurkar

== Production ==
The film was shot completely in the Konkan region of Maharashtra and stars local actors.

== Soundtrack ==
The film's music was composed by Shrikant Prabhakar, while Pradyumna Chaware and Pranav Jantikar created the background score. The sound design was managed by Dhananjay Sathe, and the lyrics were written by Shrikant Prabhakar and Prasad Khanolkar. The film's music was released under the Zee Music label.

Track listing
| No. | Title | Singer(s) | Length |
|---|---|---|---|
| 1. | "Mi Tuka Kay Dilay" | Bhagyashree Athalye, Amita Ghugari | 6:47 |
| 2. | "Gavacho Vangadi" | Shrikant Prabhakar | 3:08 |
| Total length: | | | 9:55 |

== Release ==
=== Film festivals ===
Bhera was officially selected for several film festivals worldwide, including the Chennai International Film Festival, Indian Film Festival Stuttgart, Pune International Film Festival, Third Eye Asian Film Festival (Marathi Competition), and the Chandrapur International Film Festival. The film was also officially selected by the Maharashtra Film, Stage and Cultural Development Corporation Limited for screening at the prestigious Cannes Film Festival 2024.

=== Theatrical ===
The film's teaser was released on 4 February 2025, followed by the official trailer on 7 February 2025. Bhera had special screenings on 28 February 2025 at various locations in Sindhudurg district, including Vengurla, Malvan, Kudal, and Devgad, ahead of its theatrical release on 21 March 2025.

== Accolades ==
| Award | Year | Category | Recipient(s) | Result | Ref. |
|---|---|---|---|---|---|
| Pune International Film Festival | 2024 | Special Mention Certificate – Best Director | Shrikant Prabhakar | Won | |
| Pune International Film Festival | 2024 | Akhil Bharatiy Marathi Chitrapat Mahamandal Best Film Director | Shrikant Prabhakar | Won | |
| Third Eye Asian Film Festival | 2025 | Best Female Actor (Marathi Competition) | Shraddha Khanolkar | Won | |
| Maharashtra State Film Awards | 2025 | Best Film I | Shri Vaij-Prabha Chitra | Won | |
| Maharashtra State Film Awards | 2025 | Best Rural Film | Shri Vaij-Prabha Chitra | Nominated | |
| Maharashtra State Film Awards | 2025 | Best Social Film | Shri Vaij-Prabha Chitra | Nominated | |
| Maharashtra State Film Awards | 2025 | Best Director I | Shrikant Prabhakar | Won | |
| Maharashtra State Film Awards | 2025 | Best Rural Film Director | Shrikant Prabhakar | Nominated | |
| Maharashtra State Film Awards | 2025 | Best Social Film Director | Shrikant Prabhakar | Nominated | |
| Maharashtra State Film Awards | 2025 | Best Debut Actor | Deepak Joil | Won | |
| Maharashtra State Film Awards | 2025 | Best Debut Actress | Shraddha Khanolkar | Won | |
