= Maharashtra State Film Award for Best Sound Design =

Indian film award

- Awarded for: Best Sound design in a Marathi film
- Reward: ₹100,000 (US$1,100)
- First award: 1962
- Final award: 2024

Highlights
- Total awarded: 61
- First winner: B. N. Sharma
- Last winner: Satish Dadas

The Maharashtra State Film Award for Best Sound Design was instituted in 1962, and has been presented annually at the Maharashtra State Film Awards of India to an actor for best performance in a Marathi cinema film. The awardees are decided by a jury constituted every year. They are announced by the Minister for Cultural Affairs and are presented by the Chief Minister.

== Winners ==
Year	Recipient(s)	Film	Ref.
1962	B. N. Sharma	Suvasini	
1963	B. N. Sharma	Ha Maza Marg Ekala	
1963	P. V. Krishna Reddy	Ha Maza Marg Ekala	
1963	B. P. Bharucha	Ha Maza Marg Ekala	
1964	Ramnath Jathar	Pathlaag	
1965	Vishnupant Chavan	Vavtal	
1965	Ramnath Jathar	Vavtal	
1965	A. K. Parmar	Vavtal	
1965	Mangesh Desai	Vavtal	
1966	Baba Lingnurkar	Kela Ishara Jata Jata	
1967	Vishnupant Chavan	Santh Wahate Krishnamai	
1968	Sitaram Kadam	Aamhi Jato Amuchya Gava	
1969	Vishnupant Chavan	Angaai	
1969	Baba Lingnurkar	Angaai	
1970	Baba Lingnurkar	Saticha Vaan	
1971	N. R. Joshi	Shantata! Court Chalu Aahe	
1972-73	Baba Lingnurkar	Kunku Majhya Bhagyacha	
1974	Baba Lingnurkar	Sugandhi Katta	
1975	Ramnath Jathar	Samna	
1975	Baba Lingnurkar	Samna	
1976	Kuldeep Sood	Zunj	
1976	Ramakant Mane	Zunj	
1977	Raghuveer Date	Naav Motha Lakshan Khota	
1978	Raghuveer Date	Paradh	
1979	Baba Lingnurkar	Haldi Kunku	
1980	Madhav Patade	Sinhasan	
1980	Jayoo Patwardhan	22 June 1897	
1981	Ravindra Sathe	Umbartha	
1982	Prakash Nikam	Rakhandar	
1983	Madhav Patade	Thorli Jau	
1984	Manohar Ghanekar	Hech Maze Maher	
1985	Prakash Nikam	Deva Shappath Khar Sangen	
1985	Anup Deo	Deva Shappath Khar Sangen	
1986	Ramnath Jathar	Shabas Sunbai	
1987	K. Dashrath	Sarja	
1988	Manohar Ghanekar	Rangat Sangat	
1989	Pandurang Bolur	Atmavishwas	
1990	Pradeep Deshpande	Shejari Shejari	
1991	Ramnath Jathar	Kal Ratri Bara Vajta	
1992	Raghuveer Date	Patit Pavan	
1993	Nagesh Lingnurkar	Bala Jo Jo Re	
1994	Pramod Purandare	Mukta	
1995	Vijay Bhop	Bangarwadi	
1996	Not Awarded		
1997	Not Awarded		
1998	Anil Nikam	Ashi Dnyaneshwari	
1999	Pradeep Deshpande	Lekroo	
2000	Ganpat Tawde	Jodidaar	
2001	K. V. Pandhare	Pach Shaktiman	
2002	Anita Kushwaha	Vastupurush	
2003	Appa Tarkar	Tu Na Mi	
2004	S. Kumar	Chhadi Lage Cham Cham	
2004	Suresh Munna	Chhadi Lage Cham Cham	
2005	Not Awarded		
2006	Anita Kushwaha	Restaurant	
2007	Avadhoot Wadkar	Checkmate	
2008	Pramod Thomas	Gho Mala Asla Hava	
2009	Shrikant Kamble	Mi Shivajiraje Bhosale Boltoy!	
2009	Manoj Machemadkar	Mi Shivajiraje Bhosale Boltoy!	
2010	Dilip-Satish	Ramabai Bhimrao Ambedkar	
2011	Christopher Harvey	Shala	
2012	Anil Nikam	Yeda	
2012	P. K. Shanil	Yeda	
2013	Resul Pookutty	A Rainy Day	
2013	Amrita Dutt	A Rainy Day	
2014	Pramod Thomas	Happy Journey	
2015	Pramod Thomas	Double Seat	
2016	Mahavir Sabannavar	Dashakriya	
2017	Dinesh Uchil	Palyadvari	
2018	Resul Pookutty	Kshitij - Ek Horizon	
2019	Mandar Kamlapurkar	Trijya	
2020	Rashi Butte	Bittersweet	
2021	Anil Nikam	Bebhaan	
2022	Suhas Rane	Hya Goshtila Navach Nahi	
2023	Kunal Lolsure	Shyamchi Aai	
2024	Satish Dadas	Chabila	

== Multiple wins ==
Individuals with two or more Best Sound designer Awards:

Wins	Actor
6	Baba Lingnurkar
5	Ramnath Jathar
3	Pramod Thomas; Vishnupant Chavan; Raghuveer Date; Anil Nikam
2	Resul Pookutty; B. N. Sharma; Madhav Patade; Prakash Nikam; Pradeep Deshpande; Manohar Ghanekar; Anita Kushwaha
