= Asha (film) =

2025 Indian Marathi film by Deepak Patil

- Theatrical release poster
- Directed by: Deepak Patil
- Written by: Antariksh Srivastava
- Produced by: Kumar Mangat Pathak; Abhishek Pathak; Nilesh Kuwar; Daivata Patil; Deepak Patil
- Starring: Rinku Rajguru
- Cinematography: Sarangam Suresh
- Edited by: Apurva Motiwale
- Music by: Ashish Jha
- Production companies: Panorama Studios, Onjal Arts Productions and Earthnetic Enterprises
- Distributed by: Panorama Studios
- Release date: 19 December 2025
- Country: India
- Language: Marathi

Asha is a 2025 Indian Marathi-language drama film directed by Deepak Patil and produced by Daivata Patil, Nilesh Kuwar, Abhishek Pathak and Kumar Mangat Pathak under the banner of Panorama Studios, Earthnetic Enterprises and Onjal Arts Productions. It stars Rinku Rajguru in lead role, with Sainkeet Kamat, Usha Naik, Shubhangi Bhujbal and Suhas Sirsat in supporting roles. It tells the story of an ASHA health worker navigating personal and social challenges. Centrally themed on patriarchy and the impact of superstitions on women's reproductive rights, body autonomy and her health. At its heart, this is a film about women exercising agency within limited choices.

The film was selected for 21st third eye Asian film festival. The film won Best Social Film award at 61th Maharashtra State Film Awards. The film was theatrically released on 19 December 2025.

== Plot ==
Asha follows the journey of an ASHA health worker who works at the grassroots level in rural Maharashtra. Through her interactions with villagers, healthcare officials and family members, the film portrays the emotional challenges, social resistance and moral strength required to serve as a frontline public health worker. The story focuses on themes of resilience, social responsibility and hope. Set in the interiors of rural Maharashtra, the narrative explores women's reproductive rights, the preference for a male child, gender inequality, and deeply rooted superstitions surrounding childbirth. These issues are not presented as abstract social problems, but as lived realities negotiated daily by women—both those who seek care and those who deliver it. The film is conceived in the language of world cinema, drawing inspiration from Iranian and other international realist traditions. The makers relied on natural performances, silence, and landscape to tell the story. The village is not merely a backdrop, but a living space shaped by belief, routine, and unspoken conflict. The camera observes rather than judges, allowing moments to unfold with honesty and restraint.

== Cast ==
- Rinku Rajguru as Malti
- Sainkeet Kamat as Nilesh
- Usha Naik as Rakhma Mai
- Shubhangi Bhujbal as Kamala
- Suhas Shirsat as Khopdi
- Disha Danade as Jyoti
- Rupesh Khare as Jeeva
- Dilip Ghare as Nilesh's father
- Harsha Gupte as Nilesh's mother

== Production ==
The film was shot in various rural locations in Maharashtra, including parts of Dhule district. Rinku Rajguru also interacted with real ASHA workers to understand their daily responsibilities and challenges, which helped shape her performance in the film.

== Release ==
The teaser and trailer of Asha were released online in late 2025. The film was released on 19 December 2025 in theatres.

== Reception ==
=== Critical reception ===
Janhavi Bhatkar of Maharashtra Times rated three out of five stars, calling it an honest but uneven attempt that raises important questions and draws attention to a vital social issue. Santosh Bhingarde of Sakal gave three stars out of five stars, praising its beautiful locations, effective background score, and Ashish Jha's music, though noting a slow pace due to the screenplay. Nandini Ramnath of Scroll.in wrote "The 125-minute Asha does take the trouble of making its idealised portrayal engaging. Humour, fleshed-out characters, and a clear-eyed view of chauvinist attitudes towards women boost what often feels like an extension of an ASHA recruitment drive." Pudhari gave the film 3 stars out of 5 and described it as drawing attention to the challenges faced by frontline health workers, noting that the narrative emphasises awareness, responsibility, and social change. The report also stated that the film resonated particularly with audiences for its portrayal of grassroots healthcare efforts and the emotional journey of women working in public health services.

== Soundtrack ==
The first song from Asha, titled "Chalat Raha Pudhe" was released on 29 November 2025. The second song "Vaat Hay Kutha" was dropped on 24 December 2025.

All music is composed by Ashish Jha.

Track listing
No.	Title	Lyrics	Singer(s)	Length
1.	"Chalat Raha Pudhe"	Valay Mulgund	Prachi Kelkar	2:12
2.	"Vaat Hay Kutha"	Valay Mulgund	Ankita Joshi	2:39

== Awards and nominations ==
Asha won four awards at the 61st Maharashtra State Film Awards.

Year	Date	Award	Category	Nominee	Result	Ref.
2025	5 August 2025	Maharashtra State Film Awards	Best Social Film	Asha	Won	
2025	5 August 2025	Maharashtra State Film Awards	Best Actress	Rinku Rajguru	Won	
2025	5 August 2025	Maharashtra State Film Awards	Best Supporting Actress	Usha Naik	Won	
2025	5 August 2025	Maharashtra State Film Awards	Best Social Film Director	Deepak Patil	Won	
2025	5 August 2025	Maharashtra State Film Awards	Best Background Music	Ashish Jha	Nominated	
