= Maharashtra State Film Awards =

Award given by Indian state government

- Current: 62nd Maharashtra State Film Awards
- Maharashtra State Film Award Sculpture
- Awarded for: Excellence in cinematic achievements for Marathi cinema
- Country: India
- Presented by: Government of Maharashtra
- First award: 1 May 1962; 64 years ago

Maharashtra State Film Awards, one of the prestigious awards of Marathi cinema, are awarded by the Government of Maharashtra to Marathi language films and artists. They were first awarded in 1962.

The Maharashtra State Film Awards are adjudicated by an independent jury jointly formed by the Department of Cultural Affairs, Government of Maharashtra. The jury typically comprises eminent personalities from the film industry. A separate jury is constituted for the awards recognizing literature on cinema. Films are invited for consideration annually, and the jury evaluates the submissions to select the winners. The awards aim to recognize artistic excellence in cinema and incentivize filmmakers, technicians, and producers. The Minister for Cultural Affairs announces the awardees, who are presented with the prizes by the Chief Minister of Maharashtra.

== History ==
The awards were first instituted by the Government of Maharashtra in 1962. Maharashtra was the first state in India to establish such a system of state-level film awards. The inaugural awards recognised Marathi films made between 1 January 1961 and 1 August 1962. The first prize for Best Film was awarded to Prapanch, directed by Madhukar Pathak.

== Juries and rules ==
The Maharashtra State Film Awards are adjudicated by an independent jury constituted by the Ministry of Cultural Affairs. The jury generally consists of experienced personalities from the Marathi film industry and related fields, including actors, directors, writers, technicians and other professionals. A separate jury is also constituted for awards recognising literature on cinema. Films are invited for consideration each year, following which the submitted films are screened and evaluated by the jury. The jury selects the winners in various artistic and technical categories. The composition of the jury is not permanent and may change from one edition to another.

== Awards ceremonies ==
The "Year" in the table below corresponds to the year of the film certificate issued by the CBFC. The "Date" indicates when the awards were presented to the winners.

Year	Ceremony	Date	Best First Film	Best Second Film	Best Third Film
1962	1st	24 April 1963	Prapanch	Suvasini	Shahir Parshuram
1963	2nd	1 May 1964	Rangalya Ratri Asha	Ha Maza Marg Ekala	Phakira
1964	3rd	1 May 1965	Pathlaag	Pahu Re Kiti Vaat	Thoratanchi Kamala
1964	3rd	1 May 1965	Chhota Jawan	Pahu Re Kiti Vaat	Thoratanchi Kamala
1965	4th	1 May 1966	Vavtal	Sawaal Majha Aika!	—
1966	5th	1 May 1967	Sadhi Mansa	Kela Ishara Jata Jata	Shevatcha Malusara
1967	6th	1 May 1968	Santh Wahate Krushnamai	Kaka Mala Vachwa	Swapna Tech Lochani
1968	7th	30 April 1969	Gharchi Rani	Aamhi Jato Amuchya Gava	Ektee
1969	8th	30 April 1970	Aparadh	Mukkam Post Dhebewadi	Dharmakanya
1970	9th	30 April 1971	Mumbaicha Jawai	Warnecha Wagh	Laxmanresha
1971	10th	30 April 1972	Gharkul	Shantata! Court Chalu Aahe	Songadya
1972-73	11th	30 April 1974	Jawai Vikat Ghene Aahe	Bholi Bhabdi	Andhala Marto Dola
1974	12th	30 April 1975	Sugandhi Katta	Kartiki	Ashi Hi Sataryachi Tarha
1975	13th	30 April 1976	Pandu Havaldar	Samna	Bayanno Navre Sambhala
1976	14th	30 April 1977	Choricha Mamla	Tumcha Aamcha Jamala	Pahuni
1977	15th	30 April 1978	Farari	Bala Gau Kashi Angai	Naav Motha Lakshan Khota
1978	16th	30 April 1979	Devaki Nandan Gopala	Bhairu Pehelwan Ki Jay	Jait Re Jait
1979	17th	30 April 1980	Janaki	Ashtavinayak	Bot Lavin Tithe Gudgulya
1980	18th	30 April 1981	22 June 1897	Sinhasan	Paij
1981	19th	30 April 1982	Umbartha	Gondhalat Gondhal	Akriet
1982	20th	30 April 1983	Shapit	Ek Daav Bhutacha	Aali Angawar
1983	21st	30 April 1984	Raghu Maina	Gupchup Gupchup	Thorli Jau
1984	22nd	30 April 1985	Hech Maze Maher	Mumbaicha Faujdar	Bahurupi
1985	23rd	30 April 1986	Ardhangi	Devashappath Khara Sangen	Streedhan
1986	24th	30 April 1987	Pudhcha Paool	Tuzya Wachun Karmena	Aaj Zale Mukt Mee
1987	25th	30 April 1988	Prem Karuya Khullam Khulla	Gammat Jammat	Khatyal Sasu Nathal Soon
1988	26th	30 April 1989	Ashi Hi Banwa Banwi	Nashibwan	Rangat Sangat
1989	27th	30 April 1990	Kalat Nakalat	Atmavishwas	Hamaal De Dhamaal
1990	28th	9 May 1991	Aaghat	Eka Peksha Ek	Kuldeepak
1991	29th	30 April 1992	Chaukat Raja	Vedh	Anpekshit
1992	30th	30 April 1993	Ek Hota Vidushak	Aapli Mansa	Vaajva Re Vaajva
1993	31st	30 April1994	Vazir	Savat Mazi Ladki	Lapandav
1994	32nd	30 April 1995	Mukta	Varsa Laxmicha	Majha Chakula
1995	33rd	30 April 1996	Doghi	Bangarwadi	Aboli
1996	34th	30 April 1997	Raosaheb	Putravati	Suna Yeti Ghara
1997	35th	30 April 1998	Paij Lagnachi	Sarkarnama	Navsacha Por
1998	36th	30 April 1999	Tu Tithe Mee	Ratra Aarambh	Hasari
1999	37th	30 April 2000	Gabhara	Bindhaast	Gharabaher
2000	38th	30 April 2001	Dhyaas Parva	Astitva	Mrugjal
2001	39th	30 April 2002	Devki	Ek Hoti Vaadi	Zanzavat
2002	40th	30 April 2003	Dahavi Fa	Vastupurush	Bhet
2003	41st	30 April 2004	Shwaas	Not Only Mrs. Raut	Vitthal Vitthal
2004	42nd	30 April 2005	Uttarayan	Savarkhed Ek Gaon	Saatchya Aat Gharat
2005	43rd	30 April 2006	Dombivli Fast	Kaydyacha Bola	Khabardar
2006	44th	30 April 2007	Nital	Restaurant	Savali
2007	45th	30 April 2008	Tingya	Aevdhese Aabhal	Checkmate
2008	46th	30 May 2009	Harishchandrachi Factory	Jogwa	Dhudgus
2009	47th	30 April 2010	Mi Shivajiraje Bhosale Boltoy	Jhing Chik Jhing	Ek Cup Chya
2010	48th	30 April 2011	Mee Sindhutai Sapkal	Dhoosar	Platform
2011	59th	30 April 2012	Shala	Deool	Taryanche Bait
2011	59th	30 April 2012	Shala	Balgandharva	Taryanche Bait
2012	50th	30 April 2013	Kaksparsh	Tukaram	Ajintha
2013	51st	12 August 2014	Avatarachi Goshta	Pitruroon	Jayjaykar
2014	52nd	30 April 2015	Ek Hazarachi Note	Elizabeth Ekadashi	Lokmanya: Ek Yugpurush
2015	53rd	30 April 2016	Ringan	Double Seat	Dagadi Chawl
2016	54th	30 April 2017	Kaasav	Dashakriya	Ventilator
2017	55th	30 April 2018	Redu	Muramba	Kshitij: Ek Horizon
2018	56th	26 May 2019	Bhonga	Bandishala	Tendlya
2019	57th	22 February 2024	Y	Miss U Mister	Smile Please
2020	58th	22 August 2024	Me Vasantrao	Baaplyok	Goshta Eka Paithanichi
2021	59th	22 August 2024	Karkhanisanchi Waari	Frame	Godavari
2022	60th	5 August 2025	Dharmaveer	Pondicherry	Har Har Mahadev
2023	61st	5 August 2025	Bhera	Jaggu Ani Juliet	Naal 2
2024	62nd	9 September 2026	Chabila	Gharat Ganpati	Nach Ga Ghuma

== Current categories ==
The awards are presented in several categories recognising artistic, popular and technical achievements in cinema. The awards broadly comprise Honorary Awards, Popular Awards and Technical Awards, covering various aspects of filmmaking and performances. The Honorary Awards recognise distinguished contributions to the development and growth of cinema. The V. Shantaram Lifetime Achievement Award is presented for an outstanding contribution to Marathi cinema, while the Raj Kapoor Award recognises an outstanding contribution to Hindi cinema. The V. Shantaram Special Contribution Award and Raj Kapoor Special Contribution Award are also presented for significant contributions to Marathi and Hindi cinema, respectively.

The Popular Awards recognise achievements in areas such as acting and other aspects of popular cinema, while the Technical Awards recognise excellence in various technical and creative crafts involved in film production. The awards are intended to recognise and encourage artistic excellence, technical achievement and significant contributions to the development of cinema in Maharashtra. Award recipients are presented with a Statuette and a cash prize.

=== Lifetime Achievement ===
List of current Lifetime Achievement categories by year introduced
Year introduced	Category
1992	Lata Mangeshkar Award
1993	V. Shantaram Lifetime Achievement Award
1997	Raj Kapoor Award

=== Special Contribution ===
List of current Special Contribution categories by year introduced
Year introduced	Category
2008	V. Shantaram Special Contribution Award
2008	Raj Kapoor Special Contribution Award

=== Popular awards ===
List of current Feature film categories by year introduced
Year introduced	Category
Film & direction awards
1962	Dadasaheb Phalke Award for Best Film
1962	Baburao Painter Award for Best Film
1962	Master Vinayak Award for Best Film
1962	Bhalji Pendharkar Award for Best Director
1962	Raja Paranjape Award for Best Director
1962	Raja Thakur Award for Best Director
1984	V. Shantaram Award for Best Social Film
1984	Datta Dharmadhikari Award for Best Social Film Director
1993	Dada Kondke Award for Best Rural Film
1993	Anant Mane Award for Best Rural Film Director
Acting & debut Awards
1962	Shivaji Ganesan & Shahu Modak Award for Best Actor
1962	Smita Patil Award for Best Actress
1962	Chintamanrao Kolhatkar Award for Best Supporting Actor
1962	Shanta Hublikar & Hansa Wadkar Award for Best Supporting Actress
1984	Gajanan Jagirdar Award for Best Child Artist
1984	Best Choreography
1995	Damu Anna Malvankar & Ratnamala Award for Best Comedian
2000	Ranjana Deshmukh Award for Best Debut Actress
2009	Best Debut Director
2009	Best Debut Production
2015	Kashinath Ghanekar Award for Best Debut Actor
Music awards
1962	Arun Paudwal Award for Best Music Director
1962	G. D. Madgulkar Award for Best Lyricist
1962	Best Male Playback Singer
1962	Best Female Playback Singer
2017	Best Background Score
Technical & writing awards
1962	Best Screenplay
1962	Acharya Atre Award for Best Dialogue
1962	Best Editing
1962	Pandurang Naik Award for Best Cinematography
1962	Saheb Mama Urf Fatehlal Award for Best Art Direction
1962	Best Sound Design
1962	Best Costume Design
1962	Best Make-up
1967	Madhusudan Kalelkar Award for Best Story
2015	Best Sound Mixing

== Discontinued and intermittent categories ==
Following are the discontinued Maharashtra State Film Awards category:

== Records ==
List of films with most awards
Film (Year)	No. of awards won
Paij Lagnachi (1997)	13
Ardhangi (1985)	12
Doghi (1995)	12
Raosaheb (1996)	12
Ek Hoti Vaadi (2001)	12
Aamhi Jato Amuchya Gava (1968)	11
Tu Tithe Mee (1998)	11
Aparadh (1969)	10
Sugandhi Katta (1974)	10
Aaghat (1990)	10
Not Only Mrs. Raut (2003)	10
Me Vasantrao (2020)	10
