= Kabir Khandare =

Indian child actor

- Born: Kabir Shashi Khandare
- Occupation: Actor
- Years active: 2021–present
- Known for: Gypsy (2023)
- Parent: Shashi Khandare (father)
- Awards: National Film Award for Best Child Artist (2023)

Kabir Khandare is an Indian child actor who works in Marathi cinema. He is best known for his lead role in the film Gypsy (2023), for which he won the National Film Award for Best Child Artist at the 71st National Film Awards.

== Early life ==
Khandare was born in Pune, Maharashtra. He is the son of Shashi Khandare, a Marathi filmmaker and writer. He made his initial acting appearances in short films directed by his father, most notably the 2021 short Surma.

== Career ==
In 2023, Khandare played the lead role of Jotya in the feature film Gypsy. The film follows a young boy from a nomadic community and his struggle for education and dignity. To prepare for the role, Khandare reportedly spent significant time with nomadic tribes and performed many scenes barefoot in high-temperature outdoor locations to maintain the film's realism.

The film received international attention, being showcased at the 77th Cannes International Film Festival (Marché du Film) and the 55th International Film Festival of India (IFFI).

== Accolades ==
For his performance in Gypsy, Khandare received several awards:

- National Film Awards: National Film Award for Best Child Artist (71st edition, awarded in 2025 for films released in 2023).
- Maharashtra State Film Awards: Best Child Actor (61st edition).
- Pune International Film Festival: Special Jury Award.

== Filmography ==
Year	Title	Role	Notes
2021	Surma	—	Short film
2023	Gypsy	Jotya	Feature debut

== See also ==
- 71st National Film Awards
- List of Marathi films of 2023
