= Maharashtra State Film Award for Best Costume Design =

Indian film award

- Awarded for: Best costume design in a Marathi film
- Reward: ₹100,000 (US$1,100)
- First award: 1984
- Final award: 2024

Highlights
- Total awarded: 39
- First winner: Baliram Patil; Minakshi Korgaonkar
- Last winner: Ganesh Lonare; Shivaji Karde

The Maharashtra State Film Award for Best Costume Design is an award, begun in 1984, presented annually at the Maharashtra State Film Awards of India to an actor for best performance in a Marathi cinema film. The awardees are decided by a jury constituted every year. The recipients' names are announced by the Minister for Cultural Affairs and they are presented by the Chief Minister.

== Winners ==
Year	Recipient(s)	Film	Ref.
1984	Baliram Patil	Mahananda	
1984	Minakshi Korgaonkar	Mahananda	
1985	Shyam Kamble	Dhum Dhadaka	
1986	Digamber Jadhav	Aaj Zale Mukt Mee	
1987	Ratnakar Lingnurkar	Khatyal Sasu Nathal Soon	
1988	Deepak Joshi	Pandharichi Vaari	
1989	Smita Talwalkar	Kalat Nakalat	
1989	Nita Nardekar	Kalat Nakalat	
1990	Pradnya	Aamchyasarkhe Aamhich	
1990	Anil Khanna	Aamchyasarkhe Aamhich	
1991	Anita Berde	Ek Full Chaar Half	
1992	Shripad Pai	Aapli Mansa	
1993	Ganpat Jadhav	Sai Baba	
1994	Avadhoot Sane	Yadnya	
1995	Anita Berde	Jamla Ho Jamla	
1995	Prakash Nimkar	Jamla Ho Jamla	
1996	Not Awarded		
1997	Mahadev Shinde	Soon Ladki Sasarchi	
1998	Sham Kane	Andhala Sakshidar	
1999	Sanyogita Bhave	Gharabaher	
2000	Deepa Manjrekar	Astitva	
2000	Shefali Gupta	Astitva	
2001	Mrunal Khade	Ek Hoti Vadi	
2002	Nerle Guruji	Ovaalni	
2003	Jayoo Patwardhan	Anahat	
2004	Sumitra Bhave	Baadha	
2005	Not Awarded		
2006	Poornima Oak	Kshan	
2007	Geeta Godbole	Jagad Janani Shri Mahalakshmi	
2008	Neha Nupura	Jogwa	
2009	Sudhir Salvi	Agnidivya	
2010	Snigdha Akolkar	Mani Mangalsutra	
2011	Poornima Oak	Rajmata Jijau	
2012	Poornima Oak	Tukaram	
2013	Harshada Khanvilkar	Duniyadari	
2013	Promita Jadhav	Duniyadari	
2014	Bhausaheb Shinde	Khwada	
2015	Nachiket Barve	Katyar Kaljat Ghusali	
2015	Poornima Oak	Katyar Kaljat Ghusali	
2016	Poornima Oak	Doctor Rakhmabai	
2017	Prakash Nimkar	Ziprya	
2018	Chaitrali Gupte	Ek Sangaychay	
2019	Vikram Phadnis	Smile Please	
2020	Sachin Lovalekar	Me Vasantrao	
2021	Shafaq Khan	Ye Re Ye Re Pavsa	
2021	Rohita More	Ye Re Ye Re Pavsa	
2021	Nilesh Bhumre	Ye Re Ye Re Pavsa	
2022	Saurabh Kapde	Tath Kana	
2022	Sumedh Jadhav	Tath Kana	
2023	Manasi Attarde	Jaggu Ani Juliet	
2024	Ganesh Lonare	Dharmarakshak Mahaveer Chhatrapati Sambhaji Maharaj	
2024	Shivaji Karde	Sajna	

== Multiple wins ==
Individuals with two or more Best Sound designer Awards:

Wins	Recipients
5	Poornima Oak
