= Maharashtra State Film Award for Best Debut Production =

Indian film award

- Awarded for: Debut Production in a Marathi film
- Sponsored by: Maharashtra State Film Awards
- First award: 2009
- Final award: 2023

Highlights
- First winner: Kajal Kiran Films
- Latest winner: A Square Group

The Maharashtra State Film Award for Best Debut Production is presented annually at the Maharashtra State Film Awards of India to a production company for their debut in a Marathi cinema film.

== Winners ==
Year	Production company	Film	Ref.
2009	Kajal Kiran Films	Janma	
2010	Kailas Pictures	Karuyat Udyachi Baat	
2011	Boutique Cinema Private Limited	Gajaar: Journey of the Soul	
2012	Eva EN & Ravi Jadhav Films	Balak-Palak	
2012	Mumbai Film Company	Balak-Palak	
2013	Rajendra Talak Creations	A Rainy Day	
2014	Chitraksha Films	Khwada	
2015	My Role Motion Pictures	Ringan	
2016	TranceFX Studios	Karmavirayan	
2017	Shree Mahalaxmi Creation Co.	Copy	
2018	Shantai Motion Pictures	Bandishala	
2019	Wishberry Online Services Private Limited	Zollywood	
2020	Supri Advertising and Entertainment	June	
2020	Blue Drop Films	June	
2021	Imagine Entertainment and Media	Aata Vel Zaali	
2021	Ananth Mahadevan Films	Aata Vel Zaali	
2022	Zenith Films	Aatur	
2023	Bolpat Nirmitee	Gypsy	
2024	A Square Group	Bhundis	
