= Maharashtra State Film Award for Best Film =

Indian film award

- Awarded for: Best film in Marathi cinema
- Sponsored by: Ministry of Cultural Affairs (Maharashtra)
- Reward: ₹400,000 (US$4,300)
- First award: 1962
- Final award: 2024
- Most recent winner: Chabila (2024)

Highlights
- First winner: Prapanch (1962)

The Maharashtra State Film Award for Best Film is presented annually by the Government of Maharashtra to honour outstanding achievement in Marathi-language cinema. It is one of the most prestigious honours in the Marathi film industry and is presented as part of the Maharashtra State Film Awards ceremony.

First presented in 1962, the award was later renamed the Dadasaheb Phalke Award for Best Film. The recipients are selected by a jury appointed by the state government. Along with the award, the winner receives a statuette and a cash prize of ₹4 lakh (US$4,200).

Rajdutt is the most honoured director in this category, with seven winning films to his name, along with a co-directing credit for Shapit (1982) alongside Arvind Deshpande. Raja Thakur and the duo Sumitra Bhave–Sunil Sukthankar follow with four wins each, while Jabbar Patel and Sanjay Surkar have each directed three winning films.

== Winners ==
List of films, showing the year and director(s)
Year	Film(s)	Director(s)	Refs.
1962	Prapanch	Madhukar Pathak	
1963	Rangalya Ratri Asha	Raja Thakur	
1964	Chhota Jawan	Ram Gabale	
1964	Pathlaag	Raja Paranjape	
1965	Vavtal	Shantaram Athavale	
1966	Sadhi Mansa	Bhalji Pendharkar	
1967	Santh Vahate Krushnamai	Madhukar Pathak	
1968	Gharchi Rani	Rajdutt	
1969	Aparadh	Rajdutt	
1970	Mumbaicha Jawai	Raja Thakur	
1971	Gharkul	Raja Thakur	
1972-73	Jawai Vikat Ghene Aahe	Raja Thakur	
1974	Sugandhi Katta	Vasant Painter	
1975	Pandu Havaldar	Dada Kondke	
1976	Choricha Mamla	Babasaheb Fattelal	
1977	Farari	V. Ravindra	
1978	Devaki Nandan Gopala	Rajdutt	
1979	Janaki	Vasant Joglekar	
1980	22 June 1897	Nachiket Patwardhan	
1981	Umbartha	Jabbar Patel	
1982	Shapit	Rajdutt & Arvind Deshpande	
1983	Raghu-Maina	Rajdutt	
1984	Hech Mazhe Maher	Rajdutt	
1985	Ardhangi	Rajdutt	
1986	Pudhcha Paool	Rajdutt	
1987	Prem Karuya Khullam Khulla	Girish Ghanekar	
1988	Ashi Hi Banwa Banwi	Sachin Pilgaonkar	
1989	Kalat Nakalat	Kanchan Nayak	
1990	Aaghat	Ramakant Kavthekar	
1991	Chaukat Raja	Sanjay Surkar	
1992	Ek Hota Vidushak	Jabbar Patel	
1993	Vazir	Sanjay Rawal	
1994	Mukta	Jabbar Patel	
1995	Doghi	Sumitra Bhave–Sunil Sukthankar	
1996	Raosaheb	Sanjay Surkar	
1997	Paij Lagnachi	J.K Patil	
1998	Tu Tithe Mee	Sanjay Surkar	
1999	Gabhara	Rajeev Khandagale	
2000	Dhyaas Parva	Amol Palekar	
2001	Devki	Millind Ukey	
2002	Dahavi Fa	Sumitra Bhave–Sunil Sukthankar	
2003	Shwaas	Sandeep Sawant	
2004	Uttarayan	Bipin Nadkarni	
2005	Dombivli Fast	Nishikant Kamat	
2006	Nital	Sumitra Bhave–Sunil Sukthankar	
2007	Tingya	Mangesh Hadawale	
2008	Harishchandrachi Factory	Paresh Mokashi	
2009	Me Shivajiraje Bhosale Boltoy	Santosh Manjrekar	
2010	Mee Sindhutai Sapkal	Anant Mahadevan	
2011	Shala	Sujay Dahake	
2012	Kaksparsh	Mahesh Manjrekar	
2013	Avatarachi Goshta	Nitin Dixit	
2014	Ek Hazarachi Note	Shrihari Sathe	
2015	Ringan	Makarand Mane	
2016	Kaasav	Sumitra Bhave–Sunil Sukthankar	
2017	Redu	Sagar Vanjari	
2018	Bhonga	Shivaji Lotan Patil	
2019	Y	Ajit Wadikar	
2020	Me Vasantrao	Nipun Dharmadhikari	
2021	Karkhanisanchi Waari	Mangesh Joshi	
2022	Dharmaveer	Pravin Tarde	
2023	Bhera	Shrikant Prabhakar	
2024	Chabila	Anil Amrut Bhalerao	
