= Jaggu Ani Juliet =

2023 film directed by Mahesh Limaye

- Theatrical release poster
- Directed by: Mahesh Limaye
- Written by: Mahesh Limaye; Ambar Hadap; Ganesh Pandit
- Produced by: Punit Balan
- Starring: Amey Wagh; Vaidehi Parashurami; Manoj Joshi; Pravin Tarde
- Cinematography: Mahesh Limaye
- Edited by: Jayant Jathar
- Music by: Ajay–Atul
- Production company: Punit Balan Studios
- Distributed by: AA Films
- Release date: 10 February 2023
- Country: India
- Language: Marathi
- Box office: est.₹2.50 crore

Jaggu Ani Juliet (transl. Jaggu and Juliet) is a 2023 Indian Marathi-language romantic comedy film directed by Mahesh Limaye. It is produced by Punit Balan Studios. The film stars Amey Wagh, Vaidehi Parashurami in leading roles. The film was theatrically released on 10 February 2023.

== Cast ==
- Amey Wagh as Jaggu Dada
- Vaidehi Parshurami as Juliet
- Sameer Dharmadhikari as Madan Shringarpure
- Avinash Narkar as Mr. Ghaisas
- Savita Malpekar as Mrs. Ghaisas
- Sunil Abhyankar as Mr. Karandikar
- Renuka Daftardar as Mrs. Karandikar
- Sameer Chowgule as Mr. Nimkar
- Keyuri Shah as Mrs. Nimkar
- Abhidnya Bhave as Mrs. Gupte
- Angad Mhaskar as Mr. Gupte
- Manoj Joshi as Juliet's father
- Pravin Tarde as Unmarried guy
- Hrishikesh Joshi as Unmarried guy
- Upendra Limaye
- Jaywant Wadkar

== Soundtrack ==
The soundtrack album is composed by Ajay–Atul while lyrics co-written by Guru Thakur.

Track listing
| No. | Title | Lyrics | Singer(s) | Length |
|---|---|---|---|---|
| 1. | "Mana" | Ajay–Atul | Ajay Gogavale | 3:24 |
| 2. | "Bhavi Amdar" | Ajay–Atul | Ajay–Atul | 4:10 |
| 3. | "Kadhi Na Tula" | Guru Thakur | Sid Sriram | 3:29 |
| 4. | "Tu Bi Aan Mi Bi" | Guru Thakur | Armaan Malik; Shalmali Kholgade | 3:24 |
| Total length: | | | | 14:27 |

== Reception ==
=== Box office ===
The film collected ₹0.27 crore (US$28,000) on its opening day. Jaggu Ani Juliet collected ₹1 crore (US$100,000) in three days. The film grossed over ₹2.50 crore (US$260,000) at the box office in India.

=== Accolades ===
==== 2025 Maharashtra State Film Awards ====
Winners:

- Best Film II
- Mahesh Limaye for Best Director II
- Amey Wagh for Best Actor
- Upendra Limaye for Best Comedian Male
- Rahul Thombre, Sanjeev Hovaladar for Best Choreographer
- Ambar Hadap, Ganesh Pandit for Best Dialogue
- Manasi Attarde for Best Costume Design

Nominations:

- Best Social Film
- Mahesh Limaye for Best Social Film Director
- Vaidahi Parshurami for Best Actress
