= Rajdutt =

Indian film director

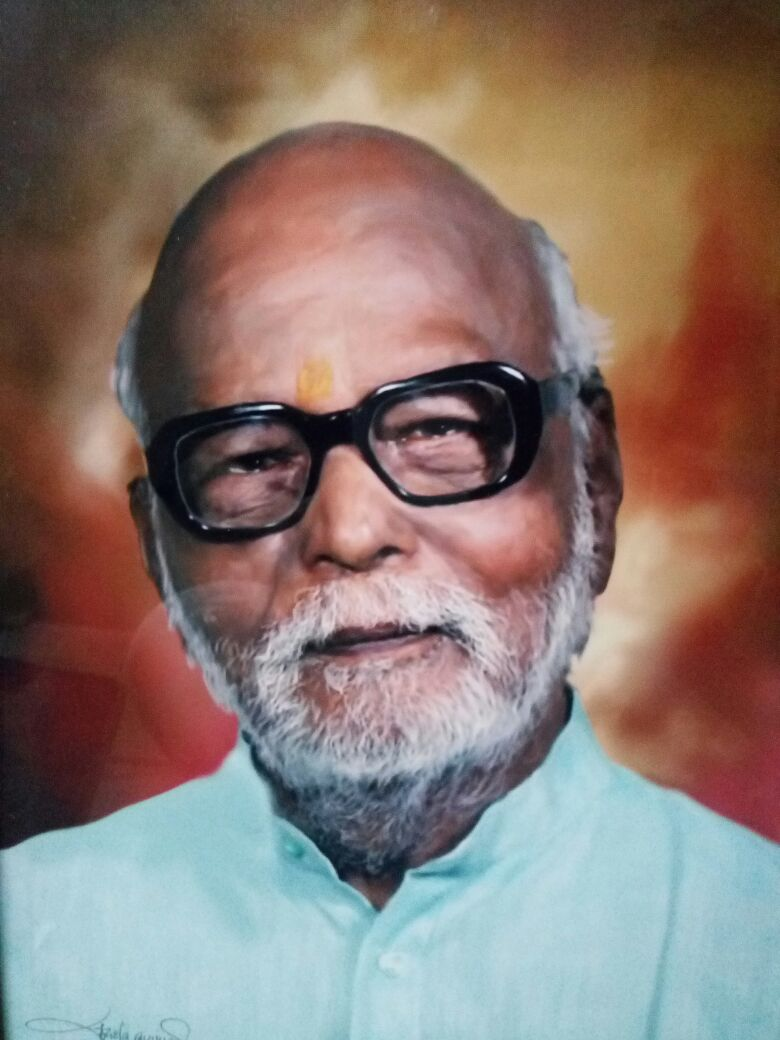
- Born: Dattatray Ambadas Mayalu; 1932 (age 93–94); Dhamangaon, Wardha district, British Raj (now Maharashtra, India)
- Education: GS College of Commerce, Wardha
- Occupations: Actor; director
- Honours: Padma Bhushan (2023)

Dattatray Ambadas Mayalu (born 1932), popularly known as Rajdutt, is an Indian director and producer in the Marathi and Hindi film industries. He directed his first film Madhuchandra in 1967. He is a recipient of three National Film Awards, three Filmfare Award Marathi, twelve Maharashtra State Film Awards, V. Shantaram Award and Zee Gaurav Lifetime Achievement Award for his contribution in Marathi cinema. In 2024, the Government of India, honoured him with Padma Bhushan, India's third highest civilian honour for his contributions to Indian culture through performing arts.

== Early life ==
Rajdutt was born in Dhamangaon, Wardha district studied commerce before working for the Nagpur daily Tarun Bharat as a subeditor and theatre reviewer. Serving as Raja Paranjpe's assistant for twelve years and appearing in a few of his films, he later recreated Pudhcha Paool.

== Career ==
Rajdutt, a prominent figure in Marathi cinema, began his career in Madras, now Chennai, where he established connections with AVM Studios. He ventured into filmmaking in 1967 with Madhuchandra, a successful experiment, and collaborated with Hindi music composer N. Datta for Marathi film music direction.

Following his debut, Rajdutt's career saw ups and downs until Bhalji Pendharkar and Lata Mangeshkar assisted him in producing Gharchi Rani. The film received accolades, including the Maharashtra State Film Award for Best Film, yet Rajdutt never sought personal recognition.

In 1969, Apradh earned him the State Government's First Prize. He went on to direct 28 films, garnering 14 awards in various categories, a unique feat in Marathi cinema.

Rajdutt's work delved into nationalism, societal issues, and philosophical themes, resonating with audiences. His film Devaki Nandan Gopala transcended Maharashtra, reaching Karnataka, Tamil Nadu, England, and the United States, even being showcased at international festivals like Cannes and Venice. Shapit received recognition from the Russian Council.

Furthermore, Rajdutt ventured into Hindi cinema with Eriya, starring Sharmila Tagore and Mark Juber. His contributions earned him esteem nationally and internationally, making him a singular director in Marathi cinema.

== Filmography ==
Year	Film	Notes
1967	Madhuchandra	Debut as a director
1968	Gharchi Rani	Maharashtra State Film Award for Best Director
1969	Aparadh	Filmfare Award for Best Film – Marathi
1970	Dev Manoos	
1970	Dhakti Bahin	
1971	Jhep	
1973	Bholi Bhabadi	Maharashtra State Film Award for Best Director
1973	Varhadi Ani Vajantri	
1975	Ya Sukhano Ya	
1977	Devaki Nandan Gopala	Filmfare Award for Best Film – Marathi
1978	Chandra Hota Sakshila	
1979	Ashtavinayak	Maharashtra State Film Award for Best Second Film
1980	Bhalu	
1981	Are Sansar Sansar	
1982	Aplech Daat Aplech Oth	
1982	Shapit	National Film Award for Best Feature Film in Marathi
1983	Raghu Maina	Maharashtra State Film Award for Best Director
1983	Sasu Varchad Jawai	
1983	Hech Maze Maher	
1984	Mumbaicha Faujdar	Maharashtra State Film Award for Best Second Film
1985	Ardhangi	Maharashtra State Film Award for Best Film
1986	Aaj Zale Mukta Mi	
1986	Maaficha Sakshidar	
1986	Mazhe Ghar Mazha Sansar	
1986	Pudhcha Paool	National Film Award for Best Feature Film in Marathi
1987	Anandi Anand	
1987	Sarja	National Film Award for Best Feature Film in Marathi

== Awards and honours ==
- 1968: Maharashtra State Film Award for Best Director for Gharchi Rani
- 1969: Filmfare Marathi Award for Best Director for Aparadh
- 1969: Maharashtra State Film Award for Best Director for Aparadh
- 1973: Maharashtra State Film Awards for Best Director for Bholi Bhabdi
- 1979: Maharashtra State Film Award for Best Director for Ashtavinayak
- 1982: National Film Award for Best Feature Film in Marathi for Shapit
- 1982: Maharashtra State Film Award for Best Director for Shapit
- 1982: Filmfare Award for Best Director – Marathi for Shapit
- 1983: Maharashtra State Film Award for Best Director for Raghu Maina
- 1984: Maharashtra State Film Award for Best Director for Mumbaicha Faujdar
- 1985: Maharashtra State Film Award for Best Director for Ardhangi
- 1986: Maharashtra State Film Award for Best Director for Aaj Zale Mukta Me
- 2007: V. Shantaram Award
- 2012: Zee Chitra Gaurav Lifetime Achievement Award
- 2025: Filmfare Marathi Lifetime Achievement Award
