= Daya Dongre =

Indian actress (1940–2025)

- Born: Daya Modak; 11 March 1940; Amravati, Central Provinces and Berar, British India
- Died: 3 November 2025 (aged 85); Mumbai, Maharashtra, India
- Occupation: Actress
- Years active: 1982–1993

Daya Dongre (born Daya Modak; 11 March 1940 – 3 November 2025) was an Indian actress.

== Life and career ==
Daughter of Yamunatai Modak, who was an actress, Dongre was born on 11 March 1940 in Maharashtra. After completing school in Dharwad, Karnataka, she pursued her education in Pune and later joined Delhi's National School of Drama (NSD) to formally study theatre. Although she could not complete her training at NSD due to marriage, Sharad, her husband, convinced her to pursue acting.

At 16, Dongre made her stage debut in Rambha by Mo. G. Rangnekar, earning widespread acclaim for her natural acting. She appeared in films such as Umbartha (1982), Navri Mile Navryala (1984) and Atmavishwas (1989).

Dongre died in Mumbai on 3 November 2025, at the age of 85.

== Selected filmography ==
=== Film ===
Year	Film	Role
1982	Umbartha	Chairwoman Sheela Samson
1982	Mai Baap	Nita Bai
1983	Ashray	
1984	Navri Mile Navryala	Maasaheb Inamdar
1986	Jumbish: A Movement - The Movie	Manas' mom
1987	Khatyal Sasu Nataal Soon	Dayabai Ragde
1989	Naqab	Imran's Mother
1989	Atmavishwas	Vasanti 'Chimee' B. Sarpotdar
1990	Kuldeepak	Laxmi Inamdar
1991	Jeene Ki Sazaa	Abhijeet's mom
1991	Akayla	Airport onlooker (uncredited)
1991	Naamcheen	
1992	Shubh Mangal Savdhan	Jaya's Mother
1992	Khulyancha Bazaar	Mai
1992	Daulat Ki Jung	Shanti Chaudhry
1993	Char Divas Sasuche	Vandana Deshmukh
