= Mahesh Limaye =

Indian cinematographer

- Born: Shivkumar Madhukar Limaye
- Occupation: Cinematography
- Spouse: Shama Limaye

Mahesh Limaye is an Indian cinematographer - director known for his work in Hindi and Marathi cinema. He is known for his collaborations with Madhur Bhandarkar, Salman Khan, and Pravin Tarde.

== Early life and education ==
Mahesh was born in Dombivli, Maharashtra. From his young days he always had an inclination towards arts. He graduated from Sir J J School of Art with a degree in commercial arts, with specialization in photography. His love for music videos made him take keen interest in cinematography.

== Career ==
Following graduation, Mahesh assisted Raja Sayed, a well known cinematographer. He also had the opportunity to assist several foreign cinematographers in their advertisement projects.

Mahesh shot his first film as an independent cinematographer with director Marlon Rodrigues in 2005 named CU at 9. Bipin Nadkarni, an advertisement director chose Mahesh to shoot his directorial debut Uttarayan. He shot Bipin's second film Aevdhese Aabhal as well. He had a long partnership with Madhur Bhandarkar with films like Traffic Signal, Corporate, Fashion and Heroine. He shot 3 films for Ravi Jadhav namely Natarang, Balgandharva and Balak Palak. Mahesh rose to fame when he shot Dabaang with Salman Khan. Mahesh shot some portions of Dabangg 2 and collaborated with Prabhudeva for Dabaangg 3. Mahesh shot Marathi features like Rege, Family Katta, Mulshi Pattern. He collaborated with Punit Malhotra for Gori Tere Pyaar Mein produced by Dharma Productions. Other films that he has shot include Freaky Ali, Happy Ending, Bhikari, Shentimental.

In 2014, Mahesh debuted as a director with the Marathi feature film Yellow. At the 61st National Film Awards, the film won the Special Jury Award for feature films and two Special Mention awards for the child actors. He also directed two video shorts, namely Punaragamanayacha and Aashechi Roshnai.

He has recently worked on the Marathi feature film Sarsenapati Hambirrao Mohite.

Mahesh is currently working on his second directorial named Jaggu ani Juliet. The film is produced by Punit Balan and the duo Ajay-Atul are doing the music for the film.

== Filmography ==
Year	Film	Language	Notes
2004	Uttarayan	Marathi	
2005	CU at 9	Marathi	
2006	Corporate	Hindi	
2007	Aevdhese Aabhal	Marathi	
2007	Traffic Signal	Hindi	
2008	Fashion	Hindi	
2010	Natarang	Marathi	
2010	Dabangg	Hindi	
2011	Balagandharva	Marathi	
2012	Heroine	Hindi	
2012	Dabangg 2	Hindi	
2013	Balak Palak	Marathi	
2013	Gori Tere Pyaar Mein!	Hindi	
2014	Yellow	Marathi	Directorial debut
2014	Rege	Marathi	
2014	Happy Ending	Hindi	
2016	Freaky Ali	Hindi	
2016	Family Katta	Marathi	
2017	Shentimental	Marathi	
2017	Bhikari	Marathi	
2018	Mulshi Pattern	Marathi	
2019	Dabangg 3	Hindi	
2020	Punaragamanchya	Marathi	Short documentary
2020	Aashechi Roshnai	Marathi	Short documentary
2021	Jaggu Ani Juliet	Marathi	Also director
2022	Sarsenapati Hambirrao	Marathi	
2024	Heeramandi	Hindustani	Netflix series
2024	Phullwanti	Marathi	
2024	Dharmaveer 2	Marathi	
2026	Ramayana: Part 1	Hindi	
2026	Aadi Anant	Marathi	Also director
2027	Ramayana: Part 2 †	Hindi	

== Awards and recognition ==
- Won – National Award for Yellow as Best Film Jury
- 2025: Won – Maharashtra State Film Award for Best Director II for Jaggu Ani Juliet
