= Prapanch =

- Directed by: Madhukar Pathak
- Screenplay by: G. D. Madgulkar
- Story by: G. D. Madgulkar
- Produced by: Govind Ghanekar
- Starring: Sulochana; Shrikant Moghe; Seema Deo; Kusum Deshpande
- Cinematography: K. B. Kamat Ghanekar
- Edited by: Bhanudas Divekar
- Music by: Sudhir Phadke
- Production company: Indian National Pictures
- Release date: 7 August 1961
- Running time: 100 minutes
- Country: India
- Language: Marathi

Prapanch is a 1961 Indian Marathi- language family drama directed by Madhukar Pathak and produced by Indian National Pictures. The film stars Sulochana, Shrikant Moghe, Seema Deo, Kusum Deshpande, and Amar Sheikh in lead roles. At the 9th National Film Awards Prapanch won All India Certificate of Merit for the Third Best Feature Film. The film also won Best Feature Film at the 1st Maharashtra State Film Awards.

== Plot ==
Deva Kumbhar and his wife Paru have six children. They hope that once Paru's brother Shankar finishes his studies, their financial situation will improve. Shankar completes his education, and Deva and Paru begin to believe their dreams are finally within reach. However, Paru’s frequent pregnancies, Deva’s meager earnings, and mounting debt from a moneylender add to their burdens. When the moneylender learns that Shankar plans to start a ceramic factory, he seizes their house, which devastates Deva, leading to his untimely death. Shankar’s engagement to Champa is postponed, as he now bears the responsibility of caring for his elder brother's family. When Shankar falls ill, Paru calls Champa and decides to leave for Mumbai with her children, determined to live with dignity.

== Cast ==
- Sulochana as Paru Kumbhar
- Seema Deo as Champa
- Shrikant Moghe as Shankar Kumbhar
- Amar Sheikh as Deva Kumbhar
- Kusum Deshpande
- Asha Bhende
- Jayant Dharmadhikari
- Prabhakar Mujumdar
- Bapu Salvi
- Baburao Athane
- Balkoba Gokhale
- Shankar Ghanekar

== Soundtrack ==
Prapanch

Soundtrack album by Sudhir Phadke
- Released: 1961
- Genre: Feature film soundtrack
- Length: 17:30
- Language: Marathi
- Label: Saregama

Official audio
- Manini - Full Album on YouTube

All music is composed by Sudhir Phadke.

Track listing
No.	Title	Lyrics	Singer (s)	Length
1.	"Bail Tuzhe Harnawani"	G. D. Madgulkar	Asha Bhosle	3:40
2.	"Aala Vasant Dehi"	G. D. Madgulkar	Asha Bhosale	3:02
3.	"Mi Bheek Magnari"	G. D. Madgulkar	Asha Bhosle	4:34
4.	"Ivlya Ivlya"	G. D. Madgulkar	Sudhir Phadke	02:47
5.	"Pota Purta Pasa Pahijie"	G.D. Madgulkar	Sudhir Phadke	4:50
6.	"Vitthala Tu Veda Kumbhar"	G. D. Madgulkar	Sudhir Phadke, Chorus	1:30
Total length:				17:30

== Awards ==
Award	Ceremony	Category	Nominee(s)	Result	Ref.
National Film Awards	9th National Film Awards	All India Certificate of Merit for the Third Best Feature Film	Indian National Pictures, Madhukar Pathak	Won	
Maharashtra State Film Awards	1st Maharashtra State Film Awards	Best Feature Film	Indian National Pictures	Won	
Maharashtra State Film Awards	1st Maharashtra State Film Awards	Best Director	Madhukar Pathak	Won	
Maharashtra State Film Awards	1st Maharashtra State Film Awards	Best Actress	Sulochana	Won	
Maharashtra State Film Awards	1st Maharashtra State Film Awards	Best Supporting Actress	Kusum Deshpande	Won	
Maharashtra State Film Awards	1st Maharashtra State Film Awards	Best Music Director	Sudhir Phadke	Won	
Maharashtra State Film Awards	1st Maharashtra State Film Awards	Best Lyricist	G. D. Madgulkar	Won	
