= Raundal =

- Theatrical release poster
- Directed by: Gajanan Nana Padol
- Produced by: Balasaheb Shinde; Purushottam Bhapkar; Pramod Bhaskar Chaudhary; Bhau Shinde
- Starring: Bhausaheb Shinde; Neha Sonwane; Yashraj Dimbale; Surekha Dimbale; Mangesh Bhimraj Jondhale; Shivraj Walvekar
- Cinematography: Aniket Khandagale
- Edited by: Faizal Mahadik
- Music by: Harsshit Abhiraj
- Production companies: Bhoomika Films and Entertainment; Rise Entertainment
- Distributed by: Panorama Studios
- Release date: 3 March 2023
- Running time: 147 minutes
- Country: India
- Language: Marathi
- Box office: est.₹5 crore

Raundal is a 2023 Indian Marathi-language action drama film directed by Gajanan Nana Padol and produced by Bhoomika Films and Entertainment in association with Rise Entertainment. The music is composed by Harsshit Abhiraj, while background score is by Rohit Nagbhide. The two songs of film "Mann Baharal" and "Dhagan Abhal" become popular. The film was theatrically released on 3 March 2023.

== Cast ==
- Bhausaheb Shinde as Shiva
- Neha Sonwane as Nanda
- Yashraj Dimbale as Bittu Sheth
- Surekha Dimbale as Shashikala, Shiva's mother
- Shivraj Walvekar as Anna, Buttu's father
- Gulabrao Sanjay Lakade as Pandurang, Shiva's grandfather
- Ganesh Deshmukh as Shiva's father
- Vinayak Pawar as Sarpanch Ganpat More
- Sagar Lokhande as Tiramak
- Gajanan Padol as Sachin Gaike

== Release ==
The film was theatrically released on 3 March 2023 in Marathi. The film has been released in a total of 320 theaters with 890 shows. After the success at the box office, the makers have announced that Raundal will be released in Hindi.

== Reception ==
=== Critical reception ===
Santosh Bhingarde of Sakal rated 4 out of 5 stars and praised cinematography and criticised length of the film as well as number romantic scenes. Anub George of The Times of India rated 3 out of 5 and writes "The film has good bones, but ends up being a one-time watch". Manjiri Pokharkar of ABP Majha also gave 3 stars and praised performances, cinematography and criticised the number of songs in a movie.

=== Box office ===
The film has grossed over ₹5 crore at the box office in India and becoming one of the highest grossing Marathi film of 2023.

== Soundtrack ==
Raundal

Soundtrack album by Harsshit Abhiraj
- Released: 2023
- Genre: Feature film soundtrack
- Length: Marathi version: 26:59; Hindi version: 26:58
- Language: Marathi; Hindi
- Label: Panorama Music

Harsshit Abhiraj chronology
Dombari (2022)	Raundal (2023)

Official audio
- Raundal - Full Album on YouTube

The music is composed by Harsshit Abhiraj and songs were recorded by Vaishali Mhade, Ganesh Chandanshiv, Javed Ali and Swaroop Khan. Marathi lyrics are provided by Vinayak Pawar and Hindi by Sudhakar Sharma.

=== Track listing ===
All music is composed by Harsshit Abhiraj.

Marathi
No.	Title	Lyrics	Singer (s)	Length
1.	"Man Baharala"	Vinayak Pawar	Vaishali Mhade	5:22
2.	"Bhalari"	Balasaheb Shinde	Ganesh Chandanshiv, Vaishali Mhade, Harsshit Abhiraj	5:49
3.	"Dhagan Aabhal"	Vinayak Pawar	Javed Ali, Vaishali Mhade	4:51
4.	"Baap Gela Dur Deshi"	Vinayak Pawar	Sonu Nigam	5:42
5.	"Tufanachi Gati"	Vinayak Pawar	Divya Kumar	5:17
Total length:				26:59

All lyrics are written by Sudhakar Sharma; all music is composed by Harsshit Abhiraj.

Hindi
No.	Title	Singer (s)	Length
1.	"Aasman Pe Badal"	Javed Ali, Vaishali Mhade	4:51
2.	"Beliya Re"	Swaroop Khan, Vaishali Mhade	5:49
3.	"Man Mein Umang Hai"	Vaishali Mhade	5:21
4.	"Tuta Ek Sitara"	Sonu Nigam	5:42
5.	"Zindagi Khadan Hai"	Divya Kumar	5:17
Total length:			26:58
