= Putravati =

- Theatrical release poster
- Directed by: Bhaskar Jadhav
- Written by: Sadanand Joshi
- Produced by: M.B.Joshi
- Starring: Nilu Phule; Asha Kale; Sukanya Kulkarni; Avinash Narkar
- Music by: Shridhar Phadke
- Release date: 19 April 1996
- Running time: 124 minutes
- Country: India
- Language: Marathi

Putravati is a 1996 Indian Marathi film was produced by M.B. Joshi and directed by Bhaskar Jadhav. It stars Sukanya Kulkarni, Avinash Narkar, Nilu Phule, Asha Kale and Kalpak Joshi in lead roles. It was released in 19 April 1996.

== Plot ==
Police Commissioner Krishnakant Deshmukh and his religious family wish for his son, Kapil, to settle down. Although Kapil falls in love with Swati but his parents oppose the match due to incompatible horoscopes. Despite their objections, Kapil marries Swati.

After their marriage, Swati struggles with infertility. When multiple medical examinations fail to yield results, she consults Dr. Ashwani, a specialist renowned for helping women with similar difficulties. Under Dr. Ashwani's treatment, Swati successfully conceives and gives birth to a son named Mohan, who soon becomes the center of affection for the entire family. However, following an unexpected crisis, the family's attitude toward Mohan changes drastically. The child who was once adored becomes marginalized and rejected by almost everyone in the household, leaving Swati to stand as his principal protector.

== Cast ==
- Nilu Phule as Krishnakant Deshmukh
- Sukanya Kulkarni as Swati Deshmukh
- Asha Kale as Dr. Ashwini
- Avinash Narkar as Kapil Deshmukh
- Kalpak Joshi as Mohan Deshmukh
- Bal Dhuri
- Madhu Apte

== Soundtrack ==
The music was provided by Shridhar Phadke.

== Awards ==
=== Maharashtra State Film Awards ===
- Best Second Film - M. B. Joshi
- Best Social Film - M. B. Joshi
- Best Second Director - Bhaskar Jadhav
- Best Actress - Sukanya Kulkarni
- Best Child Artist - Kalpak Joshi
- Best Art Direction - Satish Bidkar

=== Filmfare Awards ===
- Best Film - M. B. Joshi
- Best Music Director - Shridhar Phadke

=== Screen Awards ===
- Best Film - Putravati
- Best Director - Bhaskar Jadhav
- Best Actress - Sukanya Kulkarni
