= Maharashtra State Film Award for Best Social Film =

Indian film award

- Native name: V. Shantaram Award for Best Film
- Awarded for: Best Social film in Marathi cinema
- First award: 1984
- Final award: Ministry of Cultural Affairs (Maharashtra)
- Most recent winner: Asha (2023)

Highlights
- First winner: Mahananda; Lek Chalali Sasarla (1984)

The Maharashtra State Film Award for Best Social Film is presented annually at the Maharashtra State Film Awards to the best social film in Marathi cinema. The awards are managed directly by the Government of Maharashtra under the Ministry of Cultural Affairs, Maharashtra. The category recognizes Marathi-language films that authentically address social issues, reform, and the everyday realities of contemporary society in Maharashtra. The recipients are selected by a jury appointed by the state government. The Best Social Film award was first presented in 1985, twenty-two years after the inaugural ceremony held in 1963. The category was later renamed the V. Shantaram Award for Best Film, in honour of V. Shantaram, a celebrated pioneer of Indian and Marathi cinema.

== Winners ==
List of films, showing the year and director(s)
Year	Film(s)	Director(s)	Refs.
1984	Mahananda	K. G. Korgaonkar	
1984	Lek Chalali Sasarla	N. S. Vaidya	
1985	Nikhare	Dr. Devdutt Mhatre	
1986	The Purnasatya	Bhaskar Jadhav	
1986	Anyay	Satish Randive	
1987	Vahinisaheb	Raju Phirke	
1988	Pandharichi Vaari	Ramakant Kavthekar	
1989	Suryoday	Bharat Sasane	
1990	Aaghat	Ramakant Kavthekar	
1991	Pratikar	Vilas Rakte	
1992	Patit Pavan	Aruna Raje	
1993	Paisa Paisa Paisa	Kumar Sohoni	
1994	Bhasma	Purushottam Berde	
1995	Neelambari	Satish Randive	
1996	Putravati	Bhaskar Jadhav	
1999	Ghe Bharari	Yashwant Bhalkar	
2001	Sangharsh Jeevanacha	Tapandas	
2003	Not Only Mrs. Raut	Gajendra Ahire	
2004	Devrai	Sumitra Bhave–Sunil Sukthankar	
2005	Pak Pak Pakaak	Gautam Joglekar	
2006	Mission Champion	Sangeet Kulkarni	
2007	Vasudev Balwant Phadke	Gajendra Ahire	
2009	Sukhant	Sanjay Surkar	
2010	Mala Aai Vhhaychy!	Samruddhi Porey	
2011	Dusrya Jagatil	Satish Randive	
2012	Shyamche Vadil	R. Viraj	
2013	Dr. Prakash Baba Amte – The Real Hero	Samruddhi Porey	
2014	Nagrik	Jayprasad Desai	
2015	Halal	Shivaji Lotan Patil	
2016	Oli Ki Suki	Anand Gokhale	
2017	Mantr	Devendra Shinde	
2018	Ek Sangaychay	Lokesh Gupte	
2019	Anandi Gopal	Sameer Vidwans	
2020	Godakath	Gajendra Ahire	
2021	Baalbhaarti	Nitin Nandan	
2022	Samaira	Rishi Deshpande	
2023	Asha	Deepak Patil	
2024	Sthal	Jayant Somalkar	
