= Jayjaykar =

Marathi language movie

- Directed by: Shantanu Rode
- Starring: Dilip Prabhawalkar; Suhita Thatte; Sanjay Kulkarni; Bhushan Borgaonkar; Dhawal Pokale
- Cinematography: Ashutosh Apte
- Edited by: Anil Thorat
- Music by: Abhijit Joshi
- Release date: 13 June 2014
- Country: India
- Language: Marathi

Jayjaykar is an Indian Marathi language film directed by Shantanu Rode. The film starring Dilip Prabhawalkar, Suhita Thatte, Sanjay Kulkarni and Bhushan Borgaonkar. Music by Abhijit Joshi. The film was released on 13 June 2014.

== Synopsis ==
Retired army officer Akhande is a goofy old man notorious among his neighbours for his high jinks. As luck would have it, he ends up bringing about a positive change in the lives of four hijras - Mausi, Rani, Champa and Lajjo.

== Cast ==
- Dilip Prabhawalkar as Major Akhand
- Suhita Thatte
- Sanjay Kulkarni as Mausi
- Bhushan Borgaonkar as Champa
- Dhawal Pokale as Rani
- Akash Shinde as Lajjo

== Soundtrack ==
Jayjaykar

Soundtrack album by Abhijit Joshi
- Released: 2014
- Recorded: 2014
- Genre: Feature film soundtrack
- Length: 3:45
- Language: Marathi

Official audio
- Jayjaykar – Full Album on YouTube

Track listing
No.	Title	Singer(s)	Length
1.	"Majhya Gavachya"	Sonali Patel	3:45
Total length:			3:45

== Critical response ==
Jayjaykar film received positive reviews from critics. A Reviewer of The Times of India gave the film 3 stars out of 5 and wrote "All in all it is a very sensible film that has its heart in place and one that propagates it’s message in a beautiful way without making you feel bad or pitiful about the characters. Definitely worth a watch". Sunil Nandgaonkar of The Indian Express wrote "Rode succeeds in entertaining the audience, as well as in conveying a strong social message through his debut film". A Reviewer of Zee News wrote "The subject has been given special justice due to the accurate selection of artists. Every frame in the film is properly staged". A Reviewer of Divya Marathi wrote "The skill of the director is reflected in the good subject matter, the appropriate setting. This film is a film that deepens the perspective of the third caste, the skills that are seen around the common man, rather than seeing them as individuals". Soumitra Pote of Maharashtra Times gave the film 3 stars out of 5 and wrote "The director has tried to give a good message in this movie. Only in this entire movie, his newness is seen in the middle. However, all this team has tried to make a good piece of art". Amol Parchure of News18 India wrote "But apart from these things, the movie survives on the strength of acting".
