= Shyamchi Aai (2023 film) =

2023 Indiam Marathi film by Sujay Dahake

- Theatrical release poster
- Directed by: Sujay Dahake
- Screenplay by: Sunil Sukthankar
- Based on: Shyamchi Aai by Sane Guruji
- Produced by: Amruta Arun Rao
- Starring: Om Bhutkar; Sandeep Pathak; Mayur More; Sarang Sathaye; Urmila Jagtap; Gauri Deshpande
- Cinematography: Vijay Mishra
- Edited by: B. Mahanteshwar
- Music by: Ashok Patki; Score: Saket Kanetkar, Aabha Soumitra
- Production companies: Amruta Films; Pune Film Company
- Distributed by: Panorama Studios
- Release date: 10 November 2023
- Running time: 140 minutes
- Country: India
- Language: Marathi

Shyamchi Aai (transl. Shyam's mother) is a 2023 Indian Marathi-language drama film directed by Sujay Dahake, based on a famous autobiography of the same name written by writer and social activist Sane Guruji, starring Om Bhutkar, Mayur More, Sandeep Pathak, Sarang Sathye, Urmila Jagtap, Disha Katkar, Gandhar Joshi, Aniket Sagvekar and Jyoti Chandekar. The film was theatrically released on 10 November 2023.

At the 71st National Film Awards (2023), the film won the Best Marathi Film Award.

== Cast ==
- Om Bhutkar as Shyam / Pandurang Sadashiv Sane
  - Sharva Gadgil as Young Shyam
- Sandeep Pathak as Shyam's father Bhaurao
- Gauri Deshpande as Yashoda, Shyam's mother
- Jyoti Chandekar as Durvanchi Aaji
- Urmila Jagtap as Shyam's aunt
- Deesha Katkar as Shyam's aunt
- Rachana Kadam as Shyam's elder sister
- Bhushan Vikas as Balwantrao
- Sunil Abhyankar as Vamanrao
- Sarang Sathaye as Vinoba Bhave

== Production ==
=== Development ===
The film was announced on 19 August 2021 via a promotional poster, with official confirmation that film director Sujay Dahake.

=== Casting ===
Om Bhutkar, Sandeep Pathak and Gauri Deshpande was cast as main lead of the film.

=== Filming ===
Principal photography commenced on 6 April 2022 at Pawas in Konkan. Filming also took place in Panhala, Kolhapur in May 2022 and wrapped up on 30 June 2022, confirmed by Sujay Dahake officially itself.

== Soundtrack ==
Shyamchi Aai

Soundtrack album by Ashok Patki
- Released: 2023
- Recorded: 2023
- Genre: Feature film soundtrack
- Length: 14:21
- Language: Marathi

Official audio
- Shyamchi Aai – Full Album on YouTube

The songs are composed by Ashok Patki. The first song titled "Chadi Lage Cham Cham" was released on 1 November 2023.

Track listing
No.	Title	Singer(s)	Length
1.	"Chadi Lage Cham Cham"	Ashok Patki, Vasant Bapat	2:51
2.	"Bharajari Ga Pitambara"	Rucha Bondre	4:09
3.	"Khara To Ekachi Dharama"	Mahesh Kale	3:31
4.	"Aai Tujhi Angai"	Devika Panshikar	4:30
Total length:			14:21

== Reception ==
=== Critical response ===
Kalpeshraj Kubal from The Times of India wrote "The black and white treatrment takes time for the viewer to get used to, but adds authenticity. The film's editing. background score and cinematography also stand out, making this a sincere team effort that has its roots in a bygone era but is relevant in the contemporary times as well". Devendra Jadhav from Sakal says "Apart from this, if we could have seen the depiction of Sane Guruji's future life, the color would have increased even more. Sujay Dahke's direction is excellent, but it seems that the film needed something more binding". Sanjay Ghavare from Lokmat wrote "Gauri Deshpande has tried to give her life in the title role, but somewhere else. Feels like falling short. Compared to this, Sharva Gadgil, who plays the childhood Shyam, has played an uncompromising Shyam, brilliantly presenting the nuances of his character. Sandeep Pathak has done full justice to the role of father. Om Bhutkar has done the best Sane Guruji look ever seen".
