= Savali =

Figure in Polynesian mythology

In Polynesian mythology (Samoa), Savali is the messenger of Tagaloa.

This name was given to the Samoan-language official gazette launched by the Administration of German Samoa in 1905, pursued during New Zealand administration (1914-1962) and still on print nowadays in independent Samoa.
