= Bahurupi =

- Written by: Shekhar Dhavlikar

Premiere
- Directed by: Mangesh Kadam

Bahurupi is a Marathi language theater play.

Bahurupi stars Prashant Damle and Rama Joshi . Prashant plays a double role - as a village street performer and as himself.

Prashant received the Best Actor - 2010 - Maharashtra State Award for his Bahurupi performance. He also received the Master Dinanath Award for the best drama of the year in 2010. Bahurupi has completed over 200 performances.

== Plot ==
The plot of Bahurupi is set in an old family house of the Mujumdars in Kolhapur, where the family members have gathered to celebrate the annual Navratri Pooja. The gathered family include a Grandmother - Anandi Mujumdar (played by Rama Joshi), her daughter in law and three grand children. The Mujumdars have a family history of having performances by various artists for the annual Navratri Pooja. But, due to some inauspicious proceedings it has been stopped and the goddess has jinxed. The grandmother insists on starting the tradition once again.

While the family members are trying to handle the situation caused as the artist who was supposed to perform this year Panditjee has backed out at the last moment, the local village performer Sadaa (Prashant Damle) enters their house. They misunderstand him to be the famous actor Prashant Damle due to the similarity in their looks and let him stay at their house. Sadaa lets them believe that he is the actor and takes on the character. Meanwhile, he tries to explain them time and again about their misunderstanding. But, the family members ignore him.

The grandmother plans to have the year's Navmi Pooja done by the famous actor and hopes that it would get them out of the year old jinx. The elder son plans to organize a commercial event with the actor and expects to kick start his career. After a series of preaching, song and dances Sadaa finally confesses that he is a street performer and not the actor Prashant Damle. On understanding the truth the elder son hits Sadaa and chases him out of the house. While the things unfold, the story of the Mujumdars starting an event with the famous actor reaches the actor himself. As he is unaware of any such commitment he blasts the producer of the proposed event.

The actor Prashant Damle visits the Mujumdars and inquires about their plan to organize the event. The Mujumdar brothers have already chalked out a plan for TV Reality Show which will have the famous actor and street performer visit various families and the people will have to guess the difference between the original and the duplicate. Prashant agrees to work with them after initial glitches and also agrees to perform the Navmi Pooja. The grandmother realizes that Prashant is more inclined towards monetary gains instead of actual performances and objects the pooja being done by the actor. The elder son thinks that the actor will be annoyed if not given a chance to perform the pooja and might cancel the reality show project.

Sadaa returns to the Mujumdars house to return the shawl presented to him. The grandmother insists him to perform in front of the goddess. Sadaa performs a bharud on Sant Chokhamela. The grandmother realizes that they have been jinxed as they had chased away a prostitute years ago and not allowed her to perform in front of the Goddess. The elder son realizes his fault and refuses Prashant Damle for the reality show and plans to organize an event with Sadaa overseas. The drama ends on a note where Sadaa is felicitated as per the Mujumdars tradition.
