= Mangesh Hadawale =

Indian film director

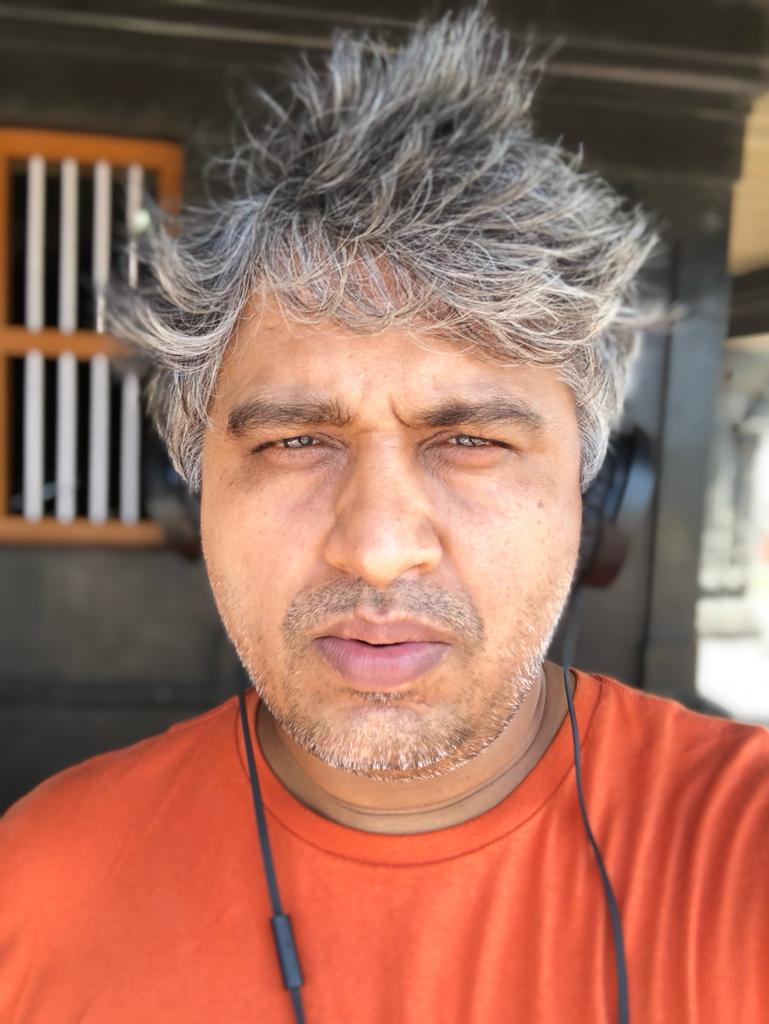
- Born: 2 September 1981 (age 45); Rajuri (Junnar, Pune)
- Occupations: Film Maker, Farmer
- Spouse: Vrushali Hadawale
- Children: Eklavya, Abhiman

Mangesh Hadawale (born 2 September 1981 in Maharashtra, India) is an Indian film writer-director and ad-film maker. His first film Tingya (2008, Marathi) received huge commercial as well as critical acclaim. Dekh Indian Circus, his second film, was in Hindi and won various national and international awards.

== Biography ==
Mangesh Hadawale was born in Rajuri village in Junnar, Maharashtra in a farming family. After completing his schooling in the Government Marathi School, Mangesh moved to Pune. In 2001 he completed graduation in theater from the Center for Performing Arts (also known as Lalit Kala Kendra.), University of Pune. He moved to Mumbai to pursue his passion of films and wrote his first script Tingya. It took him five years and 41 rejections to finally find a production house. Tingya went on to become a huge critical and commercial success.

After Tingya, Mangesh's next project in Hindi language Dekh Indian Circus was produced by Sundial Pictures. The film starring Nawazuddin Siddiqui and Tannishtha Chatterjee premiered at the 16th Busan Film Festival and won the prestigious PSB/KNN Audience Award. Dekh Indian Circus has won many national and international awards.

Mangesh is actively involved with creating multilingual ad and corporate films in the agricultural-rural sector. He has worked with brands like ICICI Bank, ICICI Lombard, MAHYCO, Bayer, UPL, Pesticides India, JU Agri Sciences and most recently Tropical Organic Agro Systems. He also directed Bill Gates Foundation's social awareness TVCs for Sutradhar Media & Communication PVT. LTD. and Pradeep Sarkar's Apocalypso Filmworks.

Mangesh made his foray into production with Tapaal, a Marathi film released in 2014. The film about a childless couple and a kid was written by Mangesh and directed by his close friend and cinematographer Laxman Utekar. He also served as a jury member at the 62nd National Film Awards, India in 2015. In 2016, an exclusive festival of his three films was held in four cities of USA.

While working on malaal, he wrote and directed Chalo Jeete Hain, a short film about a boy and his quest to find purpose of life. Film won National Award for Best Film on Family Values ...chalo jeete hain received unimaginable response and acclaim for a short film in India. The film premiered on ten channels of Star TV network simultaneously on 29 July 2018. Mangesh's 2019 directorial is titled Malaal which is being produced by Sanjay Leela Bhansali's SLB Films.

== Personal life ==
On 18 April 2010, Mangesh married his childhood friend Vrushali in Rajuri. The couple has two sons.

Mangesh enjoys being connected to his roots and has continued farming at his native place. He splits his time between films and farming. He is also part of 'Parashar Agri-tourism' and 'Hachiko Tourism' ventures in Junnar.

== Filmography ==
- Tingya (2008) - Writer-Director
- Dekh Indian Circus (unreleased) - Writer-Director
- Tapaal(2014) Writer-Producer
- Chalo Jeete Hain (2018) - Writer-Director
- Malaal (2019) - Writer-Director
- Thai Massage (2022) - Writer-Director

== Awards and nominations ==
- 2008: MTV PEPSI youth Icon
- 2008: Best Director (Tingya): Mumbai Academy of Moving Images (MAMI) festival
- 2008: Best Director (Tingya): Government of Maharashtra
- 2008: Best Debutant Director (Tingya): G. Aravindan National Award
- 2008: Best Debutant Director (Tingya): P. Lankesh National Award, Bangalore
- 2008: FIPRESCI International Critics Award for Director (Tingya): MAMI International film festival, Mumbai
- 2008: Best story (Tingya): Maharashtra Government award
- 2008: Sant Tukaram Award for Best Marathi Feature Film: Pune International Film Festival, Government of Maharashtra
- 2008: Best Dialogue (Tingya): Late. Acharya Atre Award.
- 2008 : selected in the "Indian Panorama" at International Film Festival of India
- 2011: PSB/KNN Audience Award (Dekh Indian Circus): 16th Busan International Film Festival
- 2011: Golden Plaque Award for Second Best Film (Dekh Indian Circus): International Children's Film Festival, Hyderabad
- 2012: Best Children's Film Golden Reel Award (Dekh Indian Circus): 11th Tiburon International Film Festival, California
- 2012: Opening Film (Dekh Indian Circus): 9th Stuttgart Indian Film Festival
- 2011: Nominated (Dekh Indian Circus): 47th Chicago International Film Festival
- 2011: Nominated (Dekh Indian Circus): 23rd Palm Springs International Film Festival, California
- 2011: Nominated (Dekh Indian Circus): 22nd Stockholm International Film Festival
- 2012: Nominated (Dekh Indian Circus): 12th New York Indian Film Festival
- 2012: Nominated (Dekh Indian Circus): 10th Los Angeles Indian Film Festival
- 2012: Nominated (Dekh Indian Circus): 11th East End Film Festival, London
- 2012: Nominated (Dekh Indian Circus): 3rd London Indian Film Festival
- 2013: Best Children Film (Dekh Indian Circus): National Film Awards 2012
- 2014: Tapaal World Premiere 18th Busan International Film Festival, South Korea
- 2014: Tapaal selected in the "44th Indian Panorama" at International Film Festival of India
- 2014: Official Premiere 12th Pune International Film Festival, India
- 2015: Nominated (Tapaal): Best story, First Marathi Filmfare awards, Mumbai
- 2015: Nominated (Tapaal): Best screenplay, First Marathi Filmfare awards, Mumbai
- 2019: Chalo jeete hain won National Award for the Best Non- Feature Film on Family Values
