= Tingya =

- Directed by: Mangesh Hadawale
- Starring: Sharad Goekar; Shahir Vitthal Umap; Sunil Deo; Chitra Nawathe
- Cinematography: Dharam Gulati
- Release date: March 2008
- Running time: 116 minutes
- Country: India
- Language: Marathi
- Budget: ₹22 lakh
- Box office: ₹5.8 crore (lifetime)

Tingya is a 2008 Marathi-language movie. It is the directorial début of Mangesh Hadawale. The movie is based on a life of a rural boy and his love and friendship with his bull. It concentrates on the hardships faced by the farmers in the state of Maharashtra, India. Tingya was screened at the Pune International Film Festival where it won the Sant Tukaram award for Best Marathi Feature Film. It also won the best film award at Mumbai Academy of Movies Images on 14 March 2008. Child artist (Sharad Geokar) who played the role of the rural boy won the National Film Award for Best Child Artist for the year 2008.

== Accolades ==
| Year | Ceremony | Category | Result | Ref. |
|---|---|---|---|---|
| 2008 | Maharashtra State Film Award | Maharashtra State Film Award for Best Film | Won | |
| 2008 | 55th National Film Awards | National Film Award for Best Child Artist | Won | |
