= Gypsy (2023 film) =

2023 Indian Marathi-language drama film

- Directed by: Shashi Chandrakant Khandare
- Written by: Shashi Chandrakant Khandare
- Produced by: Bolpat Nirmitee; Shraddha Shashi Khandare
- Starring: Kabir Khandare
- Cinematography: Pravin Jalindar Sonavane
- Edited by: Akshay Shinde
- Music by: Vikas Chandrakant Khandare (Sound Design)
- Production company: Bolpat Nirmitee
- Release dates: 22 May 2023 (Cannes); 26 November 2024 (IFFI)
- Running time: 105 minutes
- Country: India
- Language: Marathi

Gypsy (also known as Gypsy: The Nomadic Tribe) is a 2023 Indian Marathi-language drama film written and directed by Shashi Chandrakant Khandare in his feature film debut. The film stars child actor Kabir Khandare as Jotya, a young boy from a nomadic community.

The film received widespread critical acclaim for its depiction of social marginalization and won the National Film Award for Best Child Artist at the 71st National Film Awards. It was also selected for the Indian Panorama section at the 55th International Film Festival of India (IFFI).

== Plot ==
Jotya (Kabir Khandare) is a young boy born into an itinerant nomadic family that wanders aimlessly to survive. The narrative explores the extreme poverty and lack of basic necessities faced by his community. Forced to beg for stale food daily while his pregnant mother struggles, Jotya develops a unique sensory obsession with the smell of fresh, hot food, a luxury he is denied. The film follows his internal and external quest for dignity and a better life amidst a society that largely ignores the plight of nomadic tribes.

== Production ==
The film was the result of a five-year development period by Shashi Khandare. It was shot in the Solapur region of Maharashtra under challenging weather conditions, with temperatures reaching 42 °C (107.6 °F). To maintain authenticity, lead actor Kabir Khandare performed several sequences barefoot. The director intended the film to spark dialogue regarding the illiteracy and "sensory experiences" of marginalized children.

== Release and reception ==
Gypsy premiered at the Marché du Film during the 2024 Cannes Film Festival. It had its Indian premiere at the 55th IFFI in Goa, where it competed for the Silver Peacock for Best Debutant Director.

== Accolades ==
The film was a major winner at both state and national levels:

| Year | Award | Category | Nominee | Result |
|---|---|---|---|---|
| 2025 | 71st National Film Awards | Best Child Artist | Kabir Khandare | Won |
| 2025 | 61st Maharashtra State Film Awards | Best Rural Film | Gypsy | Won |
| 2024 | 55th International Film Festival of India | Best Debut Director | Shashi Khandare | Nominated |
| 2024 | Pune International Film Festival | Special Jury Mention (Acting) | Kabir Khandare | Won |

At the 61st Maharashtra State Film Awards, the film won a total of eight awards, including Best Screenplay, Best Cinematography, and Best Sound Design.
