= Restaurant (2006 film) =

Restaurant is a Marathi language movie. It is the debut film of director Sachin Kundalkar.

== Plot ==
The film is the story of Janhvi (played by Sonali Kulkarni) and Padmakka (played by Uttara Baokar), descendants of a Maharashtrian royal family who run a restaurant. Janhvi is a trained cook who has given up cooking as a reaction to the death of her companion Paul. Sameer (played by Sameer Dharmadhikari), Janhvi's friend who is a cook joins the restaurant in order to assist in modernising the restaurant. However destiny has other things in store. A property dispute complicates the situation.

== Critical review ==
Amrit Gangar in the Routledge Handbook of Indian Cinema considers Restaurant as an example of novelty introduced into Marathi cinema by Marathi film makers since Shwaas. Vidyarthi Chatterjee compliments the film for its pace and for its seasoned handling of the conflict between tradition and modernity, and the motivation created by self-esteem felt by an artist in seeking to be perfect in the practice of his art and the attempt by a person to drown sorrow and the sense of being alone in work.
