= 57th Maharashtra State Film Awards =

Award ceremony for Indian films of 2019

- Awarded for: Best of Marathi cinema in 2019
- Awarded by: Government of Maharashtra
- Announced on: 29 April 2022
- Site: NSCI Dome, Worli, Mumbai
- Hosted by: Amey Wagh and Vaidehi Parashurami
- Official website: www.filmcitymumbai.org

Highlights
- Best Feature Film: Y
- Most awards: Miss U Mister (5)

The 57th Maharashtra State Film Awards, presented by the Government of Maharashtra celebrated excellence in Marathi cinema by honoring the best films released in 2019.

The nominations for the awards were announced on 29 April 2022 by the Minister of Cultural Affairs, Amit Deshmukh, along with winners in the technical and child artist categories. The award ceremony took place on 22 February 2024.

In total, 89 entries certified by the Central Board of Film Certification (CBFC) released between 1 January and 31 December 2019, were submitted for the preliminary round of evaluation. Originally, the ceremony was scheduled to take place in May 2022, but it was postponed due to the 2022 Shiv Sena split.

== Jury members ==
• Ramesh Salgaonkar	• Arun Mhatre
• Kishu Paul	• Prashant Patade
• Shrirang Aras	• Vijay Kadam
• Manohar Achrekar	• Dilip Thakur
• Jaywant Raut	• Pradeep Pednekar
• Nandu Vardam	• Prakash Jadhav
• Ramesh More	• Kumar Sohoni

== Awards and nominations ==
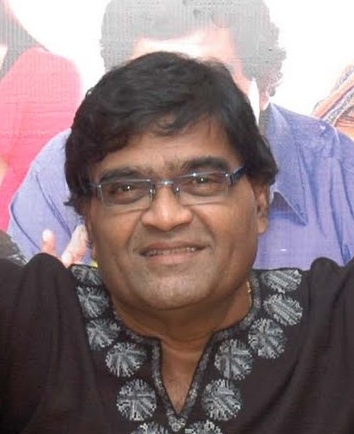
Ashok Saraf, Maharashtra Bhushan

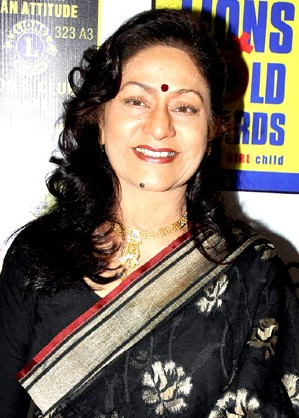
Aruna Irani, Raj Kapoor Award

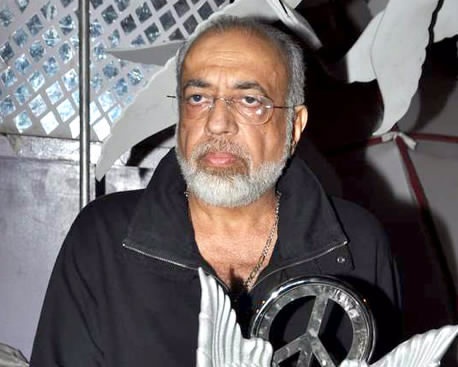
J. P. Dutta, Raj Kapoor Special Contribution Award

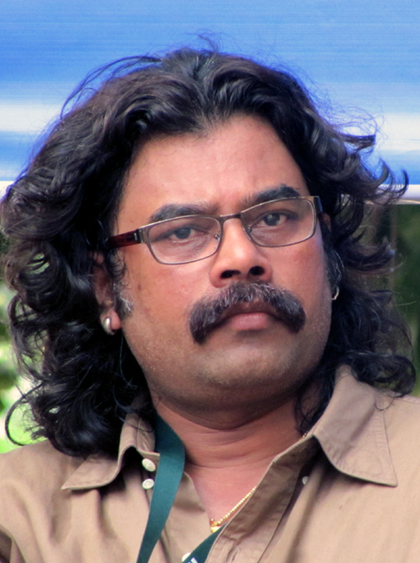
Gajendra Ahire, V. Shantaram Special Contribution Award

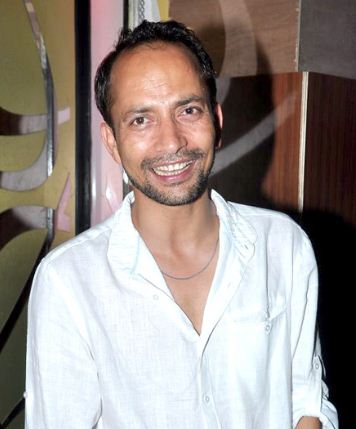
Deepak Dobriyal, Best Actor

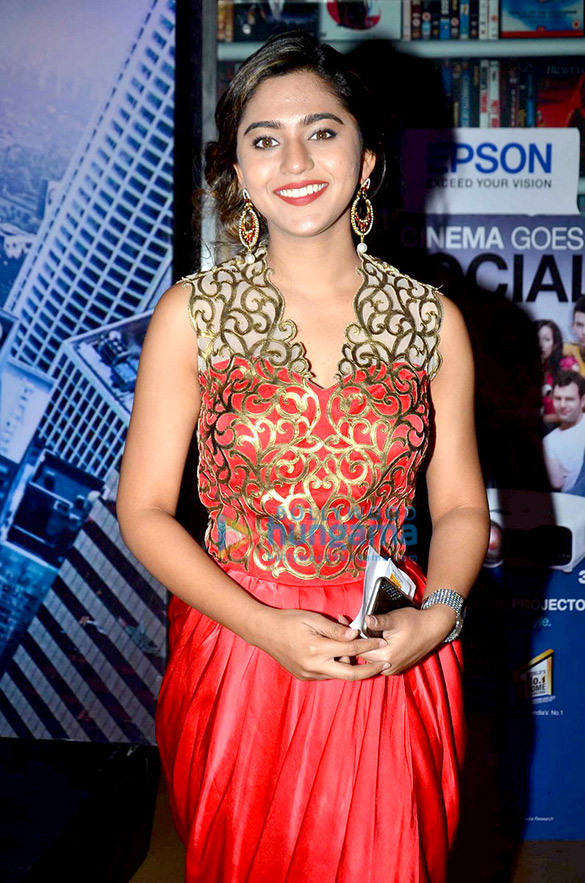
Mrunmayee Deshpande, Best Actress

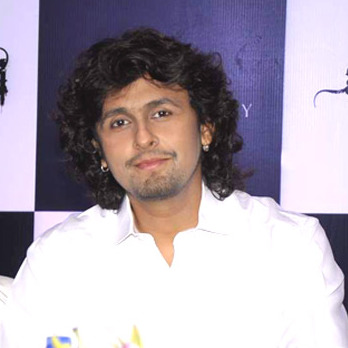
Sonu Nigam, Best Male Playback Singer

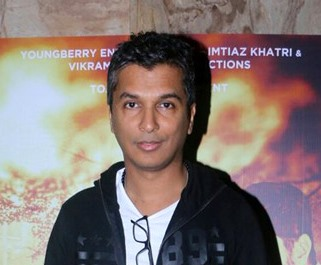
Vikram Phadnis, Best Third Director

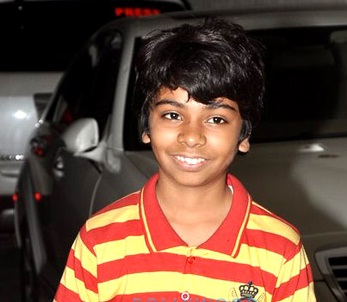
Parth Bhalerao, Best Comedian

=== Film and director awards ===
Best Film I	Best Director I
Y	Ajit Wadikar – Y
Best Film II	Best Director II
Miss U Mister	Sameer Joshi – Miss U Mister
Best Film III	Best Director III
Smile Please	Vikram Phadnis – Smile Please
Best Rural Film	Best Rural Film Director
Tajmahal	Niyaz Mujawar – Tajmahal
Best Social Film	Best Social Film Director
Anandi Gopal; Y; Smile Please; Miss U Mister; Anandi Gopal; Basta; Baba; Bardo; Panghrun; Prawaas	Sameer Vidwans – Anandi Gopal; Ajit Wadikar – Y; Vikram Phadnis – Smile Please; Sameer Joshi – Miss U Mister; Sameer Vidwans – Anandi Gopal; Tanaji Ghadge – Basta; Raj R. Gupta – Baba; Bhimrao Mude– Bardo; Mahesh Manjrekar – Panghrun; Shashank Udapurkar – Prawaas

=== Acting awards ===
Best Actor (Shahu Modak and Sivaji Ganesan Award)	Best Actress (Smita Patil Award)
Deepak Dobriyal – Baba as Madhav; Lalit Prabhakar – Anandi Gopal as Gopalrao Joshi; Kailash Waghmare – Gaabh as Dadu	Mrunmayee Deshpande – Miss U Mister as Kaveri; Sonali Kulkarni – Pension as Vimal; Bhagyashree Milind – Anandi Gopal as Anandi Gopal Joshi
Best Supporting Actor (Chintamanrao Kolhatkar Award)	Best Supporting Actress (Shanta Hublikar and Hansa Wadkar Award)
Rohit Phalke – Panghrun as Madhav; Suhas Palshikar – Basta as Namdev Pawar; Sanjay Khapre – Tajmahal as Bhima	Nandita Patkar – Baba as Anandi; Anjali Patil – Man Fakiraa as Mahi; Kiran Khoje – Tajmahal as Shewanta
Best Child Artist (Gajanan Jagirdar Award)	Best Comedian Male (Damuanna Malvankar Award)
Aryan Menghji – Baba as Shankar	Parth Bhalerao – Basta as Nandya

=== Debut awards ===
Best Debut Film Production	Best Debut Direction
Zollywood; Man Fakiraa; Maighaat	Achyut Narayan – Vegli Vaat; Nitin Supekar – Aatpadi Nights; T. Mahesh – Ghoda
Best Debut Actor (Kashinath Ghanekar Award)	Best Debut Actress (Ranjana Deshmukh Award)
Deepak Kale – Zollywood	Ankita Lande – ''Girlz'' as Mati Desai; Akshaya Gurav – Riwanawayli as Aishwarya; Ashwini Wadekar – Zollywood as Poonam

=== Music awards ===
Best Playback Singer Male	Best Playback Singer Female
Sonu Nigam – Miss U Mister for "Yeshil Tu"; Hrishikesh Ranade – Anandi Gopal for "Mam Pauli"; Jasraj Jayant Joshi – Girlfriend for "Gaar Gaar Thetarat"	Madhura Kumbhar – Hirkani for "Jagana He Nyara Zal Ji"; Aanandi Joshi– Anandi Gopal for "Mam Pauli"; Savani Ravindra – Bardo for "Raan Petala"
Best Lyrics	Best Background Music
Sanjay Krushnaji Patil – Hirkani for "Jagana He Nyara Zal Ji"; Vaibhav Joshi – Panghrun for "Hi Anokhi Gath"; Shweta Pendse – Bardo for "Raan Petala"	Prafull-Swapnil – Smile Please; Saurabh Bhalerao – Anandi Gopal; Hitesh Modak – Panghrun
Best Music Director (Arun Paudwal Award)	Best Choreographer
Amitraj – Hirkani; Hrishikesh-Jasraj-Saurabh – Anandi Gopal; Rohan-Rohan – Smile Please	Subhash Nakashe – Hirkani for "Shivrajyabhishek Geet"; Rahul Thombre, Sanjeev Hovaladar – Girlfriend for "Lovestory"; Chinni Prakash – Once More for "Parineeti Asmanti"

=== Writing awards ===
Best Story (Madhusudan Kalelkar Award)	Best Screenplay
B. B. Borkar – Panghrun; Manish Singh – Baba; Pundalik Dhumal – Pension	Vikram Phadnis, Irawati Karnik – Smile Please; Sameer Asha Patil – Bonsaay; Niyaj Mujawar – Tajmahal
Best Dialogue
Irawati Karnik – Anandi Gopal; Shweta Pendse – Bardo; Niyaj Mujawar – Tajmahal

=== Technical awards ===
Best Costume Design	Best Makeup
Vikram Phadnis – Smile Please	Sanika Gadgil – Fatteshikast
Best Cinematography (Pandurang Naik Award)	Best Editing
Karan B. Rawat – Panghrun	Ashish Mhatre, Apurva Motiwale – Basta
Best Sound Mixing	Best Sound Editing
Mandar Kamlapurkar – Trijya	Anup Dev – Maighaat
Best Art Direction (Saheb Mama aka Fateh Lal Award)
Sunil Nigvekar, Nilesh Wagh – Anandi Gopal

=== Special awards ===
Raj Kapoor Award
- Aruna Irani
Raj Kapoor Special Contribution Award
- J. P. Dutta
V. Shantaram Lifetime Achievement Award
- Ravindra Mahajani
V. Shantaram Special Contribution Award
- Gajendra Ahire
Maharashtra Bhushan
- Ashok Saraf
