= 55th Maharashtra State Film Awards =

Award ceremony for Indian films of 2017

- Awarded for: Best of Marathi cinema in 2017
- Awarded by: Government of Maharashtra
- Presented on: 30 April 2018
- Site: NSCI Dome, Worli, Mumbai
- Hosted by: Aadesh Bandekar, Suchitra Bandekar
- Official website: www.filmcitymumbai.org

The 55th Maharashtra State Film Awards, presented by the Government of Maharashtra celebrated excellence in Marathi cinema by honoring the best films released in 2017.

The nominations for the awards were announced on 4 April 2018 by the Minister of Cultural Affairs, Vinod Tawde, along with winners in the technical and child artist categories. The award ceremony took place on 30 April 2018.

In total, 61 entries certified by the Central Board of Film Certification (CBFC) released between 1 January and 31 December 2017, were submitted for the preliminary round of evaluation.

== Jury members ==
• Ashok Rane	• Kanchan Adhikari
• Arun Mhatre	• Sharad Pol
• Narendra Pandit	• Vijay Kadam
• Satish Randive	• Anant Amembal
• Anjali Khobrekar	• Suresh Khare
• Narendra Kondra	• Sharad Sawant
• Jafar Sultan	• Keshav Pandhare

== Awards and nominations ==
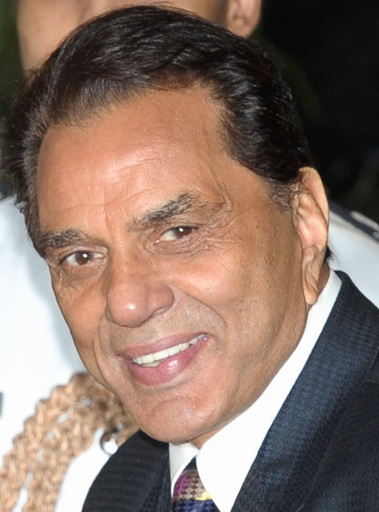
Dharmendra, Raj Kapoor Award

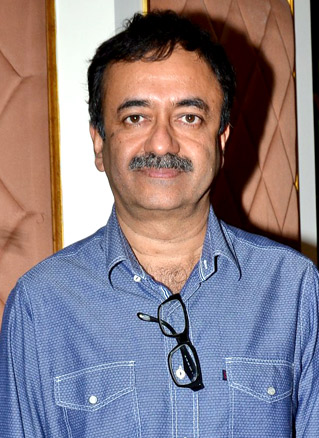
Rajkumar Hirani, Raj Kapoor Special Contribution Award

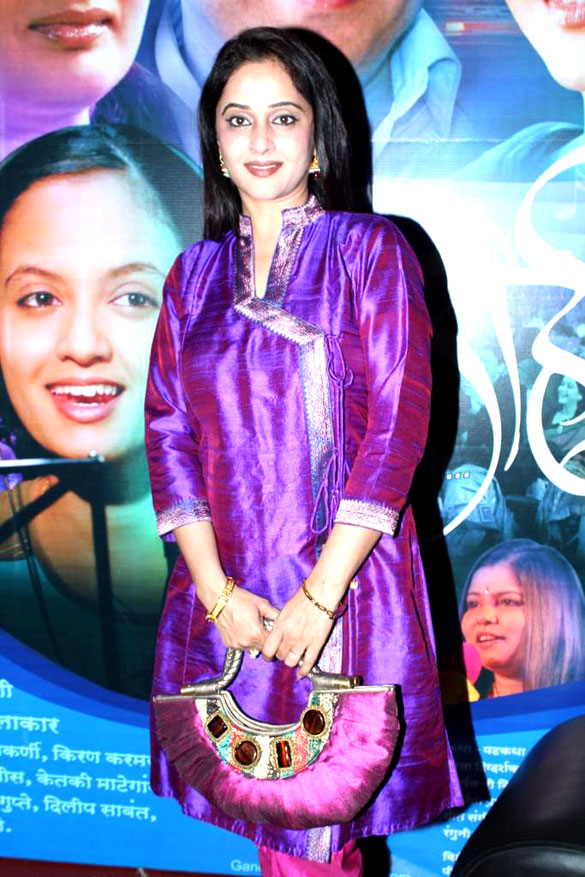
Mrinal Kulkarni, V. Shantaram Special Contribution Award

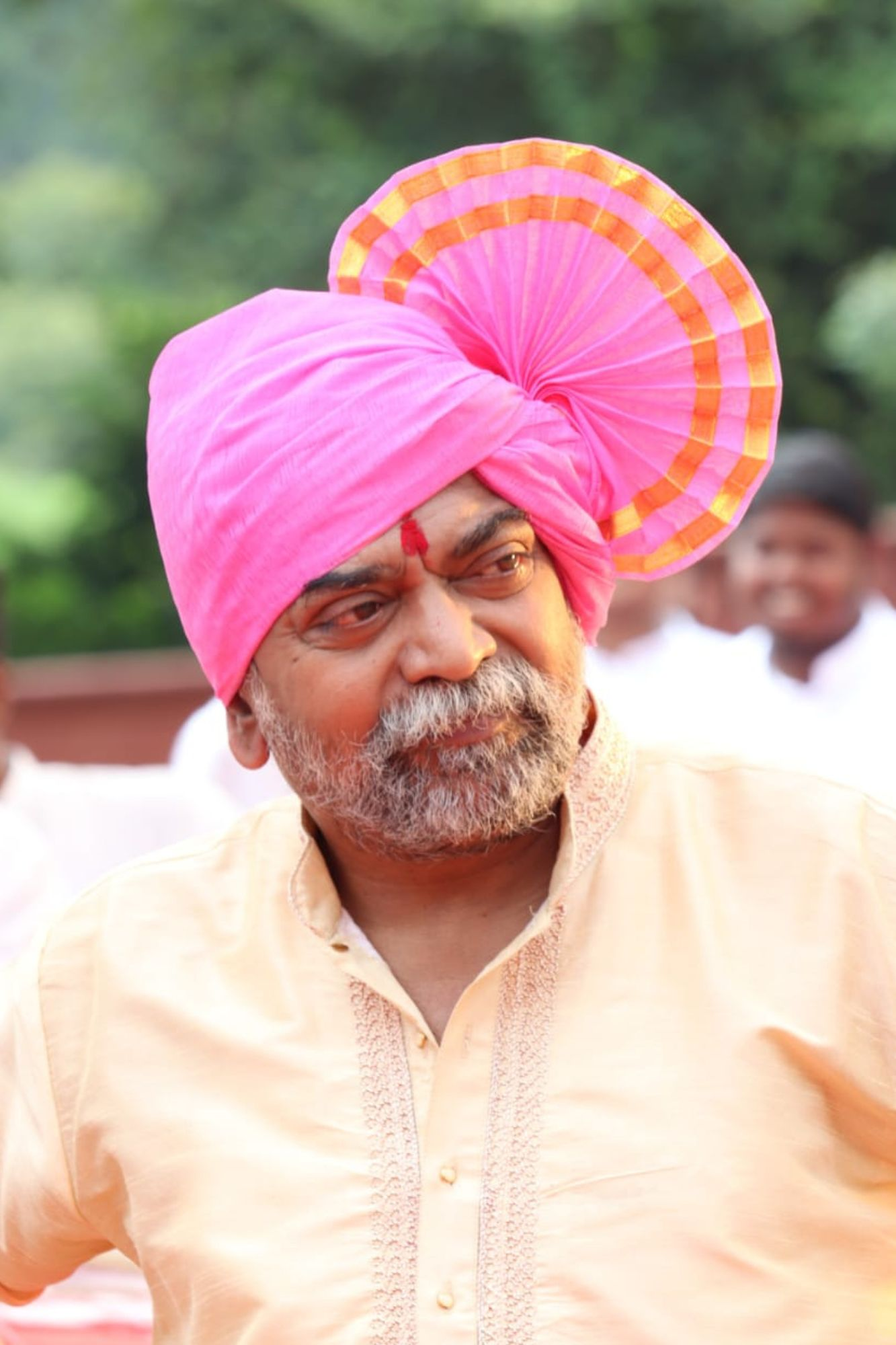
Shashank Shende, Best Actor

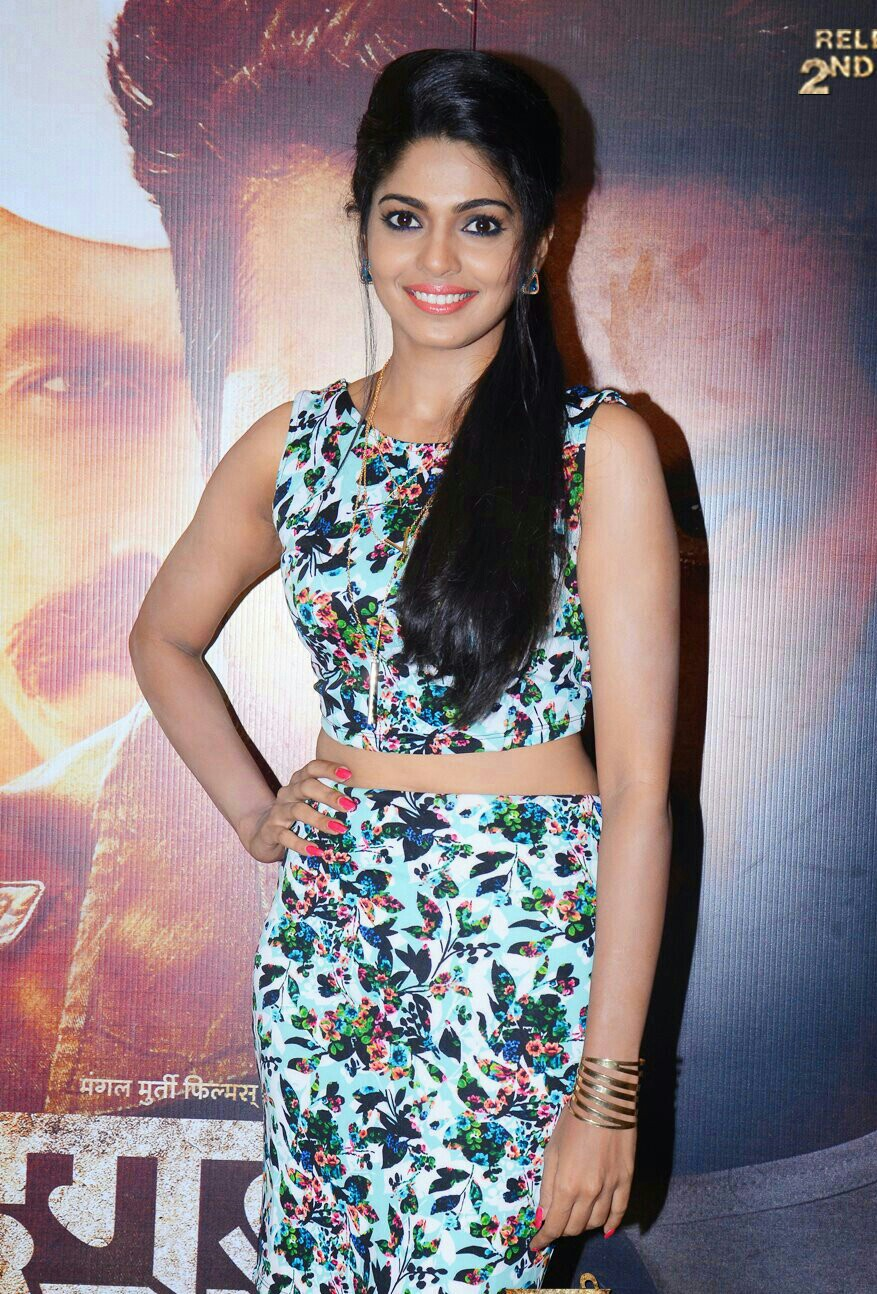
Pooja Sawant, Best Actress

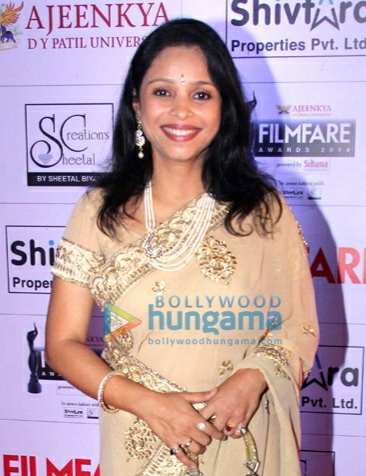
Sharvani Pillai, Best Supporting Actress

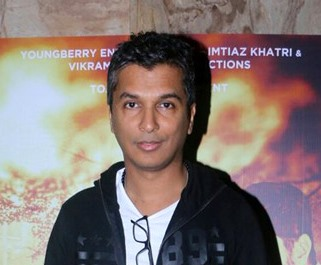
Vikram Phadnis, Best Debut Director

=== Film and director awards ===
Best Film I	Best Director I
Redu	Sagar Vanjari – Redu
Best Film II	Best Director II
Muramba	Varun Narvekar – Muramba
Best Film III	Best Director III
Kshitij Ek Horizon	Manoj Kadam – Kshitij Ek Horizon
Best Rural Film	Best Rural Film Director
Idak: The Goat	Deepak Gawade – Idak: The Goat
Best Social Film	Best Social Film Director
Mantr; Redu; Mala Kahich Problem Nahi; Asehi Ekada Vhave; Muramba; Kshitij Ek Horizon; Bhetali Tu Punha; Nashibvaan; Idak: The Goat; Ziprya	Devendra Shinde– Mantr; Sagar Vanjari – Redu; Sameer Vidwans – Mala Kahich Problem Nahi; Sushrut Bhagwat – Asehi Ekada Vhave; Varun Narvekar– Muramba; Manoj Kadam – Kshitij Ek Horizon; Chandrakant Kanse – Bhetali Tu Punha; Amol Gole – Nashibvaan; Deepak Gawade – Idak: The Goat; Kedar Vaidya – Ziprya

=== Acting awards ===
Best Actor (Shahu Modak and Sivaji Ganesan Award)	Best Actress (Smita Patil Award)
Shashank Shende – Redu as Tatu; Bhau Kadam – Nashibvaan as Baban; Umesh Kamat – Asehi Ekada Vhave as Siddharth	Pooja Sawant – Bhetali Tu Punha as Ashwini; Chhaya Kadam – Redu as Chhaya; Tejashri Pradhan – Asehi Ekada Vhave as Kiran
Best Supporting Actor (Chintamanrao Kolhatkar Award)	Best Supporting Actress (Shanta Hublikar and Hansa Wadkar Award)
Shubhankar Ekbote – Mantr as Sunny; Upendra Limaye – Kshitij Ek Horizon as Shripati; Sachin Khedekar – Muramba as Alok's Father	Sharvani Pillai – Asehi Ekada Vhave as Revati; Chinmayee Sumit – Muramba as Alok's Mother; Mitalee Jagtap Varadkar – Nashibvaan as Geeta
Best Child Artist (Gajanan Jagirdar Award)	Special Jury Award
Sahil Joshi – Aa Bb Kk as Hari; Maithli Patwardhan – Pipsi as Chaani	Chhaya Kadam - Redu as Chhaya

=== Debut awards ===
Best Debut Film Production	Best Debut Direction
Copy; Aa Bb Kk; Prabho Shivaji Raja	Vikram Phadnis– Hrudayantar; Rohan Deshpande – Pipsi; Dhondiba Karande - Palshichi PT
Best Debut Actor (Kashinath Ghanekar Award)	Best Debut Actress (Ranjana Deshmukh Award)
Rohit Phalke – Manjha	Kiran Dhane – Palshichi PT

=== Music awards ===
Best Playback Singer Male	Best Playback Singer Female
Ajay Gogavale – Redu for "Devak Kalji Re"; Javed Ali – Huntash for "Dise Dhoosar Dhoosar"; AV Prafullachandra – Zala Bobhata for "Zunjur Munjur Pahatela"	Savani Shende – Asehi Ekada Vhave for "Savare Rang Mein"; Aanandi Joshi – Autrocity for "Aalabai Tarunya"; Shalmali Kholgade – Nashibvaan for "Sonyachi Pankh Lavun"
Best Lyrics	Best Background Score
Guru Thakur – Redu for "Devak Kalji Re"; Ashwini Shende – Ti Saddhya Kay Karte for "Jara Jara Tipur Chandane"; Vaibhav Joshi – Asehi Ekada Vhave for "Bhetate Ti Ashi"	Nandkumar Ghanekar – Nashibvaan; Vijay Narayan Gavande – Redu; Narendra Bhide – Pimpal
Best Music Director (Arun Paudwal Award)	Best Choreographer
Vijay Narayan Gavande – Redu; AV Prafullachandra – Zala Bobhata; Hrishikesh-Saurabh-Jasraj – Mala Kahich Problem Nahi	Rajesh Bidwe– Shentimental; Umesh Jadhav – Ziprya; Shiamak Davar – Hrudayantar

=== Writing awards ===
Best Story (Madhusudan Kalelkar Award)	Best Screenplay
Deepak Gawade– Idak: The Goat; Devendra Shinde – Mantr; Sanjay Navgire – Redu	Sanjay Navgire– Redu; Paresh Mokashi, Madhugandha Kulkarni– Chi Va Chi Sau Ka; Sanjay Jamkhindi – Bhetali Tu Punha
Best Dialogue
Rohini Ninawe – Hrudayantar; Devendra Shinde – Mantr; Varun Narvekar– Muramba

=== Technical awards ===
Best Costume Design	Best Makeup
Prakash Nimkar – Ziprya	Shrikant Desai– Redu
Best Cinematography (Pandurang Naik Award)	Best Editing
Archana Borhade – Idak: The Goat	Devendra Murdeshwar – Ziprya
Best Sound Mixing	Best Sound Editing
Dinesh Uchil – Palyadvasi	Resul Pookutty, Arnav Datta – Kshitij Ek Horizon
Best Art Direction (Saheb Mama aka Fateh Lal Award)
Vinayak Katkar – Ziprya

=== Special awards ===
Raj Kapoor Award
- Dharmendra
Raj Kapoor Special Contribution Award
- Rajkumar Hirani
V. Shantaram Lifetime Achievement Award
- Vijay Chavan
V. Shantaram Special Contribution Award
- Mrinal Kulkarni
