= 62nd Maharashtra State Film Awards =

Award ceremony for Indian films of 2024

- Awarded for: Best of Marathi cinema in 2024
- Awarded by: Government of Maharashtra
- Announced on: 9 September 2026
- Site: Ravindra Natya Mandir, Prabhadevi
- Hosted by: Suyash Tilak; Gautami Deshpande
- Official website: www.filmcitymumbai.org

Highlights
- Best Feature Film: Chabila
- Most awards: Sthal (6)

The 62nd Maharashtra State Film Awards presented by the Government of Maharashtra, celebrated excellence in Marathi cinema by honoring the best films released in 2024.

The nominations were announced on 26 March 2026 by the Minister of Cultural Affairs, Ashish Shelar, who also revealed the winners in the technical and child artist categories. The award ceremony took place on 9 September 2026.

On 29 July 2026, the special honours were announced. Salim Khan received the Raj Kapoor Award, Rani Mukerji was honored with the Raj Kapoor Special Contribution Award, Hridaynath Mangeshkar received the V. Shantaram Lifetime Achievement Award, and Prasad Oak was presented the V. Shantaram Special Contribution Award. At the ceremony, veteran actress and Salim Khan's wife, Helen, received the award on his behalf as he was unwell.

Sthal went on to dominate the ceremony with six wins, including Best Social Film, while Chabila followed with five wins.

== Jury members ==
• Mitalee Jagtap Varadkar	• Milind Gawali
• Deepak Kadam	• Megha Dhade
• Vijay Khochikar	• Suhas Rane
• Poonam Chalke-Pawar	• Nandu Vardam
• Meera Velankar	• Subodh Pawar
• Udaysingh Mohite	• Kishu Paul
• Narendra Bandwe	• Manoj Kadam
• Ulhas Nandre	• Lahu Panchal

== Awards and nominations ==
Paresh Mokashi, Best Director III

Sunil Barve, Best Actor

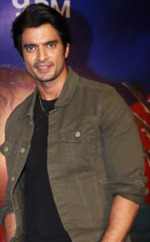
Gashmeer Mahajani, Best Actor

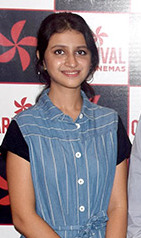
Ritika Shrotri, Best Comedian Female

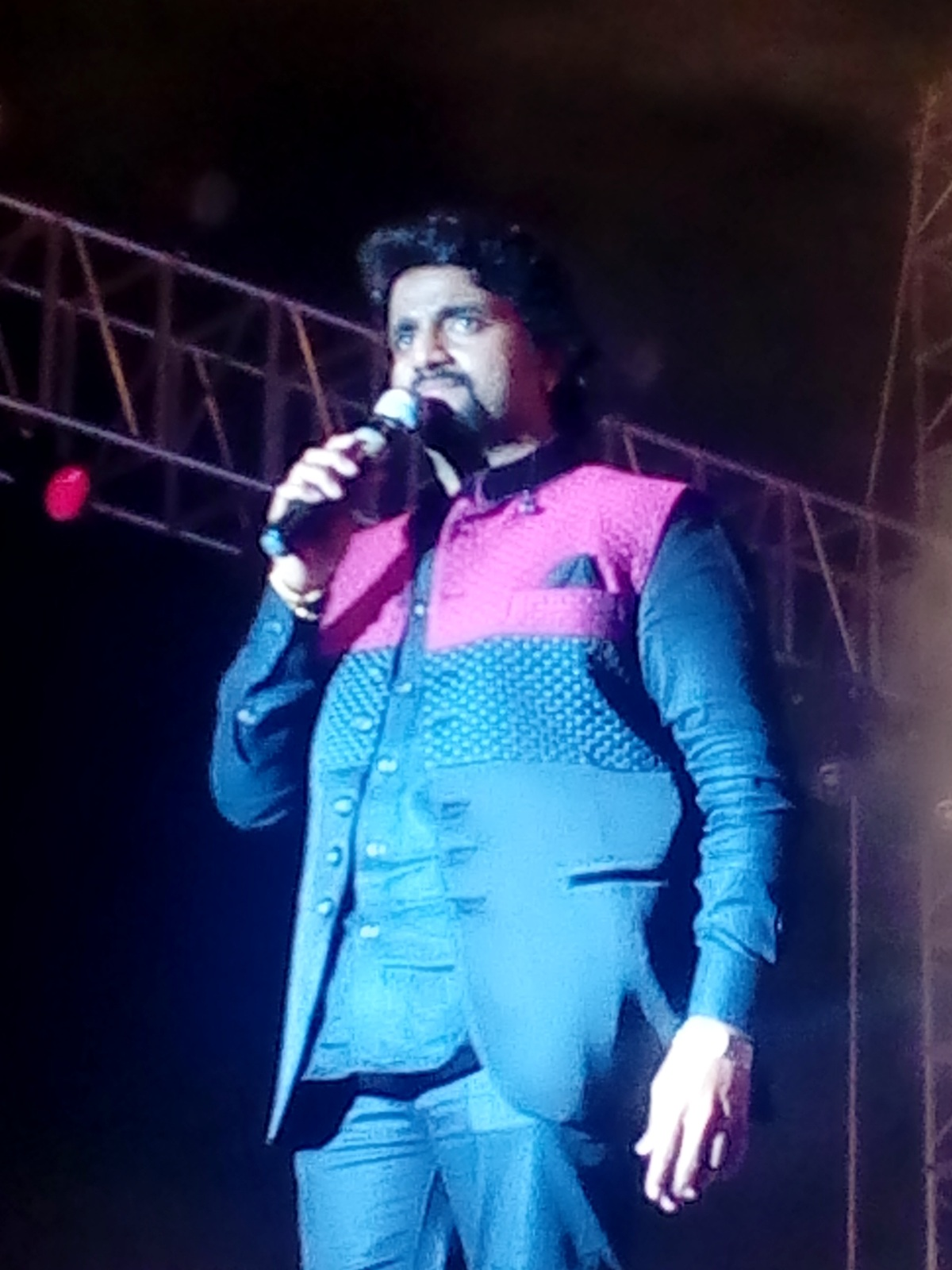
Adarsh Shinde, Best Playback Singer Male

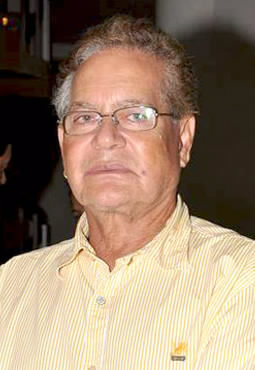
Salim Khan, Raj Kapoor Award

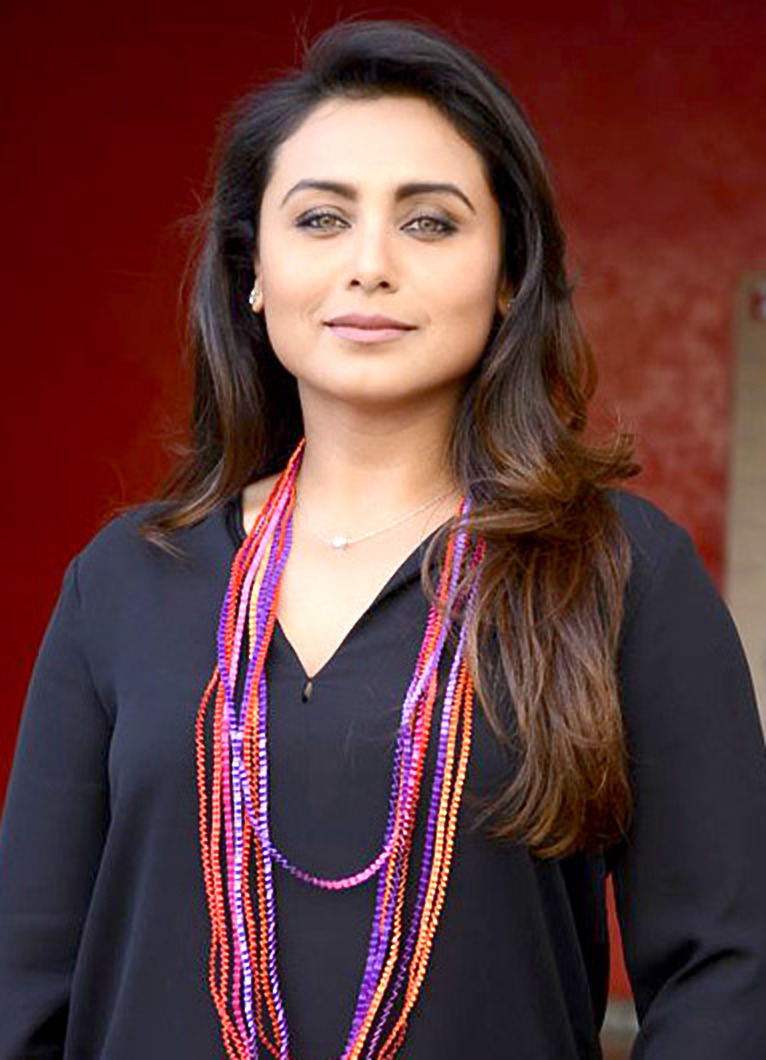
Rani Mukerji, Raj Kapoor Special Contribution Award

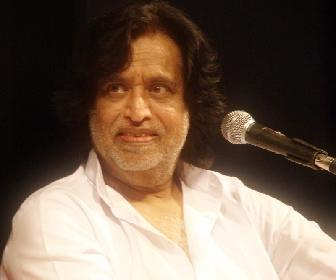
Hridaynath Mangeshkar, V. Shantaram Lifetime Achievement Award

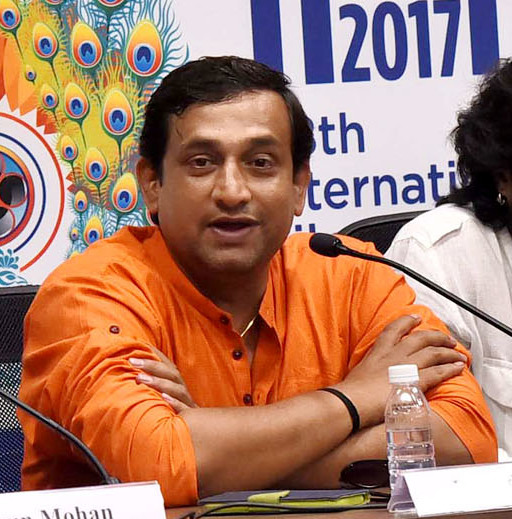
Prasad Oak, V. Shantaram Special Contribution Award

=== Film and director awards ===
Best Film I	Best Director I
Chabila	Anil Amrut Bhalerao – Chabila
Best Film II	Best Director II
Gharat Ganpati	Navjyot Bandiwadekar – Gharat Ganpati
Best Film III	Best Director III
Nach Ga Ghuma	Paresh Mokashi – Nach Ga Ghuma
Best Rural Film	Best Rural Film Director
Navardev Bsc. Agri.	Ram Khatmode – Navardev Bsc. Agri.
Best Social Film	Best Social Film Director
Sthal; Chabila; Kurla To Vengurla; Dharmarakshak Mahaveer Chhatrapati Sambhaji Maharaj; Ghaath; Swargandharva Sudhir Phadke; Gharat Ganpati; Navardev Bsc. Agri.; Nach Ga Ghuma; Mukkam Post Devach Ghar	Jayant Somalkar – Sthal; Anil Amrut Bhalerao – Chabila; Vijay Dhondu Kalamkar – Kurla To Vengurla; Tushar Shelar – Dharmarakshak Mahaveer Chhatrapati Sambhaji Maharaj; Chhatrapal Ninawe – Ghaath; Yogesh Deshpande – Swargandharva Sudhir Phadke; Navjyot Bandiwadwekar – Gharat Ganpati; Ram Khatmode – Navardev Bsc. Agri.; Paresh Mokashi – Nach Ga Ghuma; Sanket Mane – Mukkam Post Devach Ghar

=== Acting awards ===
Best Actor (Shahu Modak and Sivaji Ganesan Award)	Best Actress (Smita Patil Award)
Sunil Barve – Swargandharva Sudhir Phadke as Sudhir Phadke; Gashmeer Mahajani – Phullwanti as Venkatadhwari Narasimha Shastri; Milind Shinde – Ghaath as Raghunath	Swati Gotawale – Chabila as Jana; Nandini Chikte – Sthal as Savita; Suruchi Adarkar – Ghaath as Kusari
Best Supporting Actor (Chintamanrao Kolhatkar Award)	Best Supporting Actress (Shanta Hublikar and Hansa Wadkar Award)
Taranath Khiratkar – Sthal as Daulatrao Wandhare; Dhananjay Mandaokar– Ghaath as Falgun; Janardhan Kadam – Ghaath as Perku	Namrata Sambherao – Nach Ga Ghuma as Asha; Sushma Deshpande – Gharat Ganpati as Maai Gharat; Kshitee Jog – Fussclass Dabhade as Jayashree (Taidi)
Best Comedian Male (Damuanna Malvankar Award)	Best Comedian Female (Ratnamala Award)
Ameya Parab – Kurla To Vengurla; Nitin Kulkarni – Vishay Hard; Prakash Bhagwat – Rajakaran Gela Mishit	Ritika Shrotri – Mu. Po. Bombilwaadi as Kundalini; Shweta Parkhe – Rajkaran Gela Mishit; Trupti Shedge – Fussclass Dabhade as Manju
Best Child Artist (Gajanan Jagirdar Award)
Dhanashree Bhosale – Savitrichya Leki; Hrishi More – Savitrichya Leki; Rasika Khandgale – Savitrichya Leki; Agel Kalikuri – Savitrichya Leki

=== Debut awards ===
Best Debut Film Production	Best Debut Direction
Bhundis; Sajana; Savitrichya Leki	Anil Bhalerao – Chabila; Harshad Nalawade – Follower; Sumit Patil– Vishay Hard
Best Debut Actor (Kashinath Ghanekar Award)	Best Debut Actress (Ranjana Deshmukh Award)
Adish Vaidya – Swargandharva Sudhir Phadke as Young Phadke; Jitendra Barde – Morrya; Sumit Patil – Vishay Hard as Sandya	Bhakti Ghogare – Giran as Guna; Kajal Pardesi – Chabila as Dipi; Anagha Rane – Kurla To Vengurla as Sharmila

=== Music awards ===
Best Playback Singer Male	Best Playback Singer Female
Adarsh Shinde – Lagna Kallol for "Ghaav Lagla"; Ajay Gogavale – Yek Number for "Jahir Zala Jagala"; Harshavardhan Wavare – Rukhwat for "Look Look Chandani"	Rajeshwari Pawar – Sajana for "Zoka"; Aanandi Joshi – Dear Love for "Fitoor Man"; Arya Ambekar – Kaasra for "Mann Paltaya"
Best Lyricist	Best Background Score
Rocksun – Navardev Bsc. Agri. for "Lal Chikhal"; Guru Thakur – Yek Number for "Jahir Zala Jagala"; Amarjeet Amle – Kurla To Vengurla for "Ivalyashya Jaagi"	Santosh Mulekar – Sangeet Manapmaan; Sameer Mhatre – Lifeline; Aditya Bedekar – Mukkam Post Devach Ghar
Best Music Director (Arun Paudwal Award)	Best Choreography
Akshay Khot – Kurla To Vengurla; Amitraj – Fussclass Dabhade; Mohit Kulkarni – Dharmarakshak Mahaveer Chhatrapati Sambhaji Maharaj	Umesh Jadhav – Phullwanti; Rahul Thombre – Like Aani Subscribe; Sujit Kumar – Fussclass Dabhade

=== Writing awards ===
Best Story (Madhusudan Kalelkar Award)	Best Screenplay
Jayant Somalkar – Sthal; Jitendra Barde – Morrya; Chhatrapal Ninawe – Ghaath	Amarjeet Amle – Kurla To Vengurla; Chhatrapal Ninawe – Ghaath; Jayant Somalkar – Sthal
Best Dialogue
Ram Khatmode, Vinod Vanve – Navardev Bsc. Agri.; Ganesh Pandit – Ole Aale; Jayant Somalkar – Sthal

=== Technical awards ===
Best Costume Design	Best Makeup
Ganesh Lonare – Dharmarakshak Mahaveer Chhatrapati Sambhaji Maharaj; Shivaji Karde – Sajana	Sanjay Singh – Mangla; Santosh Gilbile – Dharmarakshak Mahaveer Chhatrapati Sambhaji Maharaj
Best Cinematography (Pandurang Naik Award)	Best Editing
Mahesh Aney – Swargandharva Sudhir Phadke; Mahesh Limaye – Phullwanti	Abhijit Deshpande – Sthal; Vijay Kalamkar – Kurla To Vengurla
Best Sound Mixing	Best Sound Editing
Satish Dadas – Chabila	Sanjay Chaturvedi – Sthal
Best Art Direction (Saheb Mama aka Fateh Lal Award)
Santosh Phutane – Sangeet Manapmaan; Mahesh Kore – Swargandharva Sudhir Phadke

=== Special awards ===
Raj Kapoor Award
- Salim Khan
Raj Kapoor Special Contribution Award
- Rani Mukerji
V. Shantaram Lifetime Achievement Award
- Hridaynath Mangeshkar
V. Shantaram Special Contribution Award
- Prasad Oak
Lata Mangeshkar Award

Chhatrapati Shivaji Maharaj Mahavarsha Award

== Superlatives ==
Multiple wins
Awards	Film
6	Sthal
5	Chabila
4	Navardev Bsc. Agri.
4	Swargandharva Sudhir Phadke
4	Kurla To Vengurla
4	Savitrichya Leki
3	Nach Ga Ghuma
3	Phullwanti
2	Gharat Ganpati
2	Sangeet Manapmaan
2	Dharmarakshak Mahaveer Chhatrapati Sambhaji Maharaj
2	Sajana
