= Kurla To Vengurla =

2025 Indian Marathi-language film

- Directed by: Vijay Kalamkar
- Written by: Amarjeet Amle
- Produced by: Amarjeet Amle; Vijay Kalamkar; Charudatta Soman; Nayana Sonawane; Avinash Sonawane; M. V. Sharatchandra
- Starring: Pralhad Kudtarkar; Veena Jamkar; Sainkeet Kamat; Vaibhav Mangle; Swanandi Tikekar; Sunil Tawade
- Cinematography: Ranganath Babu Gogineni
- Edited by: Vijay Kalamkar
- Music by: Akshay Khot
- Production companies: Cine Katha Kirtan; Chandrabhaga Studios; Aura Productions
- Distributed by: Pickle Entertainment
- Release date: 19 September 2025
- Running time: 118 minutes
- Country: India
- Language: Marathi

Kurla To Vengurla is a 2025 Indian Marathi-language romantic comedy-drama film directed by Vijay Kalamkar in his directorial debut, written by Amarjeet Amle, and produced by Cine Katha Kirtan, Chandrabhaga Studios and Aura Productions. It features an ensemble cast of Pralhad Kudtarkar, Veena Jamkar, Vaibhav Mangle, Sainkeet Kamat, Swanandi Tikekar and Sunil Tawade. Set in Vengurla in Maharashtra's Konkan region, the film follows three couples navigating the conflict between urban aspirations and village traditions while exploring the challenges faced by rural men in finding marriage partners.

The film was released theatrically on 19 September 2025. At the 62nd Maharashtra State Film Awards, it received eight nominations, including Best Film, and won four awards, including Best Music Director and Best Comedian Male.

== Plot ==
Anand and Gauri, a newly married couple living in the Konkan village of Vengurla, begin their married life with Gauri looking forward to moving to Mumbai, believing that Anand has a permanent job there. However, her expectations are dashed when Anand returns to the village after losing what turns out to be a temporary position.

Meanwhile, Anand's sister Sharmila rejects a marriage proposal from a family in Mumbai because she is in love with Nandu, a classmate from her village. When their father discovers the relationship, he prevents her from attending college. Anand's friend Parimal returns to Vengurla after completing his studies in Pune and plans to establish an oil factory in the village. However, his parents oppose the idea, fearing that his decision to settle in Vengurla will make it difficult for him to find a bride, as families in the area are reluctant to marry their daughters to men living in the village.

Gauri eventually accompanies Anand to Mumbai, where they live in a small tenement in a slum in Kurla. As she adjusts to their circumstances, she begins to realise that city life is far less appealing than she had imagined.

== Cast ==
- Pralhad Kudtarkar as Anand
- Veena Jamkar as Gauri
- Sainkeet Kamat as Parimal
- Anagha Rane as Sharmila Joshi
- Amey Parab as Nandu
- Sunil Tawde as Anand's father
- Vaibhav Mangle as Bajirao Tambat
- Swanandi Tikekar as Asmita Dhopeshwarkar
- Shekhar Betkar as Babu
- Kavita Amarjeet as Sharda
- Chandrashekhar Joshi as Anand's grandfather
- Nirmala Tikam as Anand's mother
- Suhas Khanolkar as Trambak Joshi
- Shweta Kudalkar as Renuka Joshi
- Gopal Joshi as Mukund Joshi
- Seema Marathe as Vanita Joshi

== Production ==
The film marks the directorial debut of Vijay Kalamkar, who has polio in both legs and also served as its co-producer and editor, while Amarjeet Amle wrote the story, screenplay and dialogues and contributed as a producer and lyricist.

== Soundtrack ==
The film's music and background score were composed by Akshay Khot, with lyrics written by Chanchal Kale and Amarjeet Amle. Khot composed the film's entire background score while staying in his native village in Malgaon, Sindhudurg district, during the COVID-19 pandemic.

Track listing
| No. | Title | Length |
|---|---|---|
| 1. | "Go Go Go Tuzya Ghovacha Naav Kay" | 3:01 |
| 2. | "Alyad Vihir Palyad Dari" | 3:24 |
| 3. | "Swapni MI Kahi Pahilele" | 3:27 |
| 4. | "Anganat Fulalya Jai Jui" | 1:50 |
| 5. | "Ivalyasha Jaagi – Mumbai" | 4:46 |
| 6. | "Ivalyasha Jaagi – Village" | 3:29 |
| Total length: | | 19:57 |

== Release ==
The film's motion poster was released in July 2025, followed by its teaser in August and trailer in September of the same year. A premiere was held at Plaza Cinema in Mumbai ahead of the theatrical release. The film was released theatrically on 19 September 2025.

In November 2025, the film completed 50 days in theatres, and a special screening was held at a mall in Goregaon, Mumbai, to mark the occasion, attended by Prajakta Mali, Bharat Ganeshpure, Vijay Patkar, Ashish Bende and Rajesh Mapuskar, among others.

== Reception ==
=== Critical response ===
Anub George of The Times of India awarded the film 3 out of 5 stars, stating, "Kurla to Vengurla is an absolute visual treat that breathes life into the coastal village, its traditions and the realities of today’s world. The brilliance of the director – Vijay Kalamkar is in the fact that it manages to do so without once sounding preachy." A critic from Film Information described the screenplay as, "Amle’s screenplay is wholesome because it gives scope for romance, comedy and even a dash of emotions." In his review for Mahanagar, Ashish Ningurkar observed, "While giving a social message, there is no burden anywhere, but it is a light, emotional and cinematic experience that can be watched with family."

=== Accolades ===
| Award | Year | Category | Recipient(s) | Result | Ref. |
|---|---|---|---|---|---|
| Maharashtra Times Sanman | 2026 | Best Supporting Actor | Sunil Tawde | Nominated | |
| Maharashtra Times Sanman | 2026 | Best Dialogue | Amarjeet Amle | Nominated | |
| Maharashtra Times Sanman | 2026 | Best Art Director | Shridhar Mistry, Mandar Pednekar, Tushar Patil | Nominated | |
| Maharashtra State Film Awards | 2026 | Best Film | Kurla To Vengurla | Nominated | |
| Maharashtra State Film Awards | 2026 | Best Director | Vijay Kalamkar | Nominated | |
| Maharashtra State Film Awards | 2026 | Best Comedian Male | Amey Parab | Won | |
| Maharashtra State Film Awards | 2026 | Best Debut Actress | Anagha Rane | Nominated | |
| Maharashtra State Film Awards | 2026 | Best Music Director | Akshay Khot | Won | |
| Maharashtra State Film Awards | 2026 | Best Lyrics | Amarjeet Amle (for "Ivalyasha Jaagi") | Nominated | |
| Maharashtra State Film Awards | 2026 | Best Screenplay | Amarjeet Amle | Won | |
| Maharashtra State Film Awards | 2026 | Best Editing | Vijay Kalamkar | Won | |
