= Sthal =

2025 Marathi drama film

- Theatrical release poster
- Directed by: Jayant Digambar Somalkar
- Written by: Jayant Digambar Somalkar
- Produced by: Shefali Bhushan; Karan Grover; Riga Malhotra; Jayant Digambar Somalkar
- Starring: Nandini Chikte
- Cinematography: Manoj Karmarkar
- Edited by: Abhijeet Deshpande
- Music by: Madhav Agarwal
- Production company: Dhun Production
- Distributed by: August Entertainment; Fiza Films
- Release dates: September 2023 (TIFF); 7 March 2025
- Running time: 107 minutes
- Country: India
- Language: Marathi

Sthal (transl. A Match) is a 2023 Indian Marathi-language drama film written and directed by Jayant Digambar Somalkar and produced under the banner of Dhun Productions while it is presented by Sachin Pilgaonkar. It stars Nandini Chikte in the lead role. The film explores the tradition of arranged marriage in rural India, where a girl's marriage takes precedence over basic survival. Told from the perspective of a young girl, Savita, Sthal highlights deep-rooted patriarchy and the harsh realities, including humiliation and societal pressures, faced by Indian brides.

The film had its world premiere in 2023 at the Toronto International Film Festival, where it won the NETPAC Award for Best Film. It was subsequently screened at several prestigious film festivals, including the Moscow International Film Festival, Cairo International Film Festival, the 15th Chicago South Asian Film Festival, the 64th Zlín Film Festival, and the Durban International Film Festival. The film was released on 7 March 2025 on the occasion of International Woman's Day. The film received widespread critical acclaim for its directorial debut, screenplay, raw authenticity, and the performances of its first-time actors, particularly Nandini Chikte and Taranath Khiratkar.

== Plot ==
Set in Dongargaon, a small town in Maharashtra, Sthal follows Savita, a young woman aspiring to complete her education and pursue a career. However, her father, Daulatrao Wandhare, a struggling cotton farmer, is determined to find her a suitable groom, as societal expectations prioritize her marriage over her ambitions.

The film portrays the deeply ingrained patriarchy and the humiliating experiences women endure in the arranged marriage system. Savita is repeatedly scrutinized based on superficial attributes like skin color, height, and caste, while her opinions remain unheard. Each meeting with a prospective groom's family follows the same degrading ritual—Savita is made to sit on a stool, examined, and judged, while the men of the groom's family hold the power in the decision-making process. The women in her household, including her mother, are reduced to serving food and observing silently.

As Savita navigates these pressures, she finds solace in her college education and shares a quiet, unspoken connection with her lecturer, who teaches about women's empowerment. However, the stark contrast between theory and reality becomes evident as her family's desperation grows. Despite her insistence on completing her studies, her father contemplates selling his land to secure a groom, believing that marriage is the only path for her future. Meanwhile, her brother, Mangya, is also eager for her marriage to be settled so he can introduce his own girlfriend to the family.

With each rejection, the pressure on Savita intensifies, highlighting the societal obsession with marriage as a woman's ultimate destiny. As the narrative unfolds, Sthal critiques the dowry system, caste hierarchy, and gender inequality, shedding light on the harsh realities many women in rural India continue to face.

== Cast ==
- Nandini Chikte as Savita
- Taranath Khiratkar as Daulatrao Wandhare
- Sangita Sonekar as Lilabai
- Suyog Dhawas as Mangya
- Sandip Somalkar as Kale Guruji
- Sandip Parkhi as Khapne sir
- Swati Ulmale as Gauri
- Gauri Badki as Ranju
- Mansi Pawar as Suman
- Sachin Tonge as Ganesh
- Shubham Shete as Pomya
- Vikrant Prakash Shinde as Iqbal
- Onkar Mohitkar as Dasrya
- Vinod Vatekar as Viththal

== Production ==
=== Development and pre-production ===
It marks the feature film debut of director Jayant Digambar Somalkar, who drew inspiration from his personal experiences. Encouraged by his wife, he chose to highlight the realities of arranged marriage after recalling his own experience within his family when he accompanied them to see a prospective bride for his cousin's marriage around 2014. Through Sthal, he aims to challenge the glamorized portrayal of weddings in mainstream media and advocate for a more nuanced perspective on the struggles faced by many Indian women. Somalkar wrote the story for the film in 2017, even before working on Guilty Minds (2022).

=== Casting and filming ===
The film features an entire cast of first-time actors from the village where it was shot. For the lead actress, extensive auditions were conducted in various colleges. Nandini Chikte auditioned on the very first day, confidently telling Somalkar that she could both dance and cry on cue. However, he remained undecided and told her he would get back to her. Determined to prove herself, Nandini auditioned again the following day, this time appearing more prepared, which ultimately convinced Somalkar to cast her in the role. Principal photography took place in the director's native village. Interestingly, the house where the film was shot is the very home where he was born, and the college attended by the protagonist, Savita, is the same one Somalkar studied at. The entire film was completed within 22 days in a single schedule. One of the biggest challenges during filming was using sync sound in a raw village setting, where locals were unfamiliar with the concept. Background noise was a constant issue, as daily village activities carried on uninterrupted. Additionally, the first-time actors, unfamiliar with a structured shooting schedule, would often leave the set to tend to their farms or water their buffaloes, making the filming process even more demanding.

=== Post-production ===
In 2024, when the film was screened at the Napa Valley Film Festival in the U.S., actor-director Sachin Pilgaonkar and his wife, actress Supriya Pilgaonkar, were urged to watch it by their daughter, Shriya Pilgaonkar, who had already seen and appreciated the film at the MAMI Mumbai Film Festival. Impressed by its narrative and impact, they felt it deserved a wider audience and considered distributing the film for a theatrical release.

== Soundtrack ==
The song is sung by Meerabai Yete, a woman from Chandrapur who has a passion for singing but is not a professional singer.

Track listing
No.	Title	Lyrics	Music	Singer(s)	Length
1.	"Pahune Yet Aahe Pori"	Jayant Somalkar	Madhav Agarwal	Meerabai Yete, Ashish Narkhedkar	3:05
Total length:					9:51

== Release ==
Sthal premiered at the 48th Toronto International Film Festival, where it was selected under the Discovery Programme. It was subsequently screened at 29 Indian and international film festivals, including the 22nd Pune International Film Festival, where it was the opening film at the Habitat Film Festival, the 46th Moscow International Film Festival, the 25th Jeonju International Film Festival, and the Cinevesture International Film Festival.

To mark the birth anniversary of Krantijyoti Savitribai Phule, the film's poster was unveiled on 3 January 2025. The theatrical release teaser came out in early February 2025, followed by the trailer in mid-February. The film was released in theaters on March 7, 2025, coinciding with International Women's Day, and opened on 155 screens across Maharashtra.

== Reception ==
=== Critical response ===
Upon its release, Sthal received widespread praise from critics and audiences alike, including well-known personalities such as Avdhoot Gupte, Shriya Pilgaonkar, and Jaya Bachchan, who described it as "true cinema."

Mihir Bhanage from The Times of India gave the film 3.5 out of 5 stars, stating that it "effectively calls out the lip service that society does, without being preachy." He further wrote, "if you rave about the simplicity and impact of Malayalam films, questioning why Marathi cinema doesn’t make such films, you need to head to cinemas and watch Sthal." Praising the film's bold approach, Santanu Das of Hindustan Times wrote, "Somalkar has created a bracingly defiant and powerful film, one that unleashes the broken discussion on arranged marriages in India with compassion and confidence." In her review for Scroll.in, Nandini Ramnath commended the performances, direction, and music, noting, "The movie is neither preachy nor heavy-going. It has honesty and compassion, a deep understanding of social structures, and a clear-eyed view of Savita’s situation." Describing it as the director's “scalding debut,” Outlook’s Debanjan Dhar wrote, "It keeps Savita’s roiling, seething spirit clamped down, all-enduring until the inevitable lashing point in its pummeling ending."

Reviewing the film for The Quint, Prateek Lidhoo lauded its storytelling and performances, stating, "With a story that tugs at your heartstrings, a pace that constantly reminds you of how layered our lives are, and a cast that gives its all to the film, Sthal stays with you." Reshma Raikwar, writing for Loksatta, described Sthal as an "important" film, emphasizing how "the audience remains hooked solely on the strength of its subject and the natural performances of the artists."

Similarly, Mid-Day's Meenakshi Shedde offered high praise for the screenplay, direction, and performances, calling it "a superb follow-up to Nagraj Manjule’s Sairat, which explores women’s agency in marriage and life." Anuj Kumar, writing for The Hindu, described it as "a sensitive exploration of organised social hypocrisy," adding, "Somalkar’s faith in untrained actors imparts the scenario a charming rawness and empathy to the characters. No one puts up an act." Aishwarya Srinivasan from Social Ketchup described the film as "brutally honest," remarking, "the film keeps you hooked from the first frame to the last with some really hard hitting facts."

Additionally, Tatsam Mukherjee of The Wire wrote, "Sthal is not the most novel story to emerge out of India, but Somalkar tells it in a measured way." A review from OTT Play observed, "Just like how details in this system are in the things left unsaid, Sthal too says a lot in its silence and absence." Baradwaj Rangan, in his review, compared the film to the critically acclaimed Malayalam film The Great Indian Kitchen and said, "Her violence against the collective is subtle, board melodramatic points about our society and reframes them from Savita’s point of view—that is the film’s success."

=== Accolades ===
Award	Year	Category	Recipient(s)	Result	Ref.
Ajanta-Ellora International Film Festival	2024	Best Film	A Match	Won	
Ajanta-Ellora International Film Festival	2024	Best Actress	Nandini Chikte	Won	
Aurangabad International Film Festival	2024	Best Film	A Match	Won	
Aurangabad International Film Festival	2024	Best Actress	Nandini Chikte	Won	
Bengaluru International Film Festival	2024	Best Film (Asian Film Competition)	A Match	Nominated	
City Cine Awards Marathi	2026	Game Changer	Nandini Chikte	Pending	
City Cine Awards Marathi	2026	Best Singer – Female	Meerabai Yete (Punha Yet Aahe Pori)	Pending	
City Cine Awards Marathi	2026	Best Lyricist	Jayant Digambar Somalkar (Punha Yet Aahe Pori)	Pending	
Filmfare Awards Marathi	2026	Best Film	Sthal	Nominated	
Filmfare Awards Marathi	2026	Best Film Critics	Jayant Digambar Somalkar	Won	
Filmfare Awards Marathi	2026	Best Director	Jayant Digambar Somalkar	Nominated	
Filmfare Awards Marathi	2026	Best Debut Director	Jayant Digambar Somalkar	Nominated	
Filmfare Awards Marathi	2026	Best Story	Jayant Digambar Somalkar	Won	
Filmfare Awards Marathi	2026	Best Screenplay	Jayant Digambar Somalkar	Nominated	
Filmfare Awards Marathi	2026	Best Dialogue	Jayant Digambar Somalkar	Nominated	
Filmfare Awards Marathi	2026	Best Lyricist	Jayant Digambar Somalkar (Punha Yet Aahe Pori)	Nominated	
Filmfare Awards Marathi	2026	Best Actor Critics	Taranath Khiratkar	Won	
Filmfare Awards Marathi	2026	Best Actor Debut	Taranath Khiratkar	Nominated	
Filmfare Awards Marathi	2026	Best Actress Critics	Nandini Chikte	Won	
Filmfare Awards Marathi	2026	Best Female Debut	Nandini Chikte	Nominated	
Filmfare Awards Marathi	2026	Best Editing	Abhijit Deshpande	Won	
Filmfare Awards Marathi	2026	Best Cinematography	Manoj Karmakar	Nominated	
Filmfare Awards Marathi	2026	Best Production Design	Vikram Singh	Nominated	
Filmfare Awards Marathi	2026	Best Sound Design	Sanjay Chaturvedi	Nominated	
FIPRESCI - India Grand Prix	2024	Top Ten Indian Films	A Match	Nominated	
Indian Film Festival Stuttgart	2024	Best Feature Film	A Match	Won	
Indian National Cine Academy	2026	Best Film	Sthal	Won	
Indian National Cine Academy	2026	Best Director	Jayant Digambar Somalkar	Nominated	
Indian National Cine Academy	2026	Best Debut Director	Jayant Digambar Somalkar	Nominated	
Indian National Cine Academy	2026	Best Actor	Taranath Khiratkar	Nominated	
Indian National Cine Academy	2026	Best Actress	Nandini Chikte	Nominated	
Indian National Cine Academy	2026	Best Production Design	Vikram Singh	Nominated	
Indian National Cine Academy	2026	Best Casting	Ashish Narkhedkar, Chandanshesh Waghmare	Nominated	
Indie Meme Film Festival	2024	Best Narrative Feature – Audience Award	A Match	Nominated	
Indie Meme Film Festival	2024	Best Narrative Feature – Jury Award	A Match	Won	
Indo-German Film Week	2024	Best Feature Film	A Match	Won	
Indo-German Film Week	2024	Best Debut Director	Jayant Digambar Somalkar	Won	
Jaffna International Cinema Festival	2024	Best Debut Feature Film	Jayant Digambar Somalkar	Won	
London Indian Film Festival	2024	Best Film	A Match	Won	
Maharashtra State Film Awards	2026	Best Social Film	Sthal	Won	
Maharashtra State Film Awards	2026	Best Social Film Director	Jayant Digambar Somalkar	Won	
Maharashtra State Film Awards	2026	Best Story	Jayant Digambar Somalkar	Won	
Maharashtra State Film Awards	2026	Best Screenplay	Jayant Digambar Somalkar	Nominated	
Maharashtra State Film Awards	2026	Best Dialogue	Jayant Digambar Somalkar	Nominated	
Maharashtra State Film Awards	2026	Best Actress	Nandini Chikte	Nominated	
Maharashtra State Film Awards	2026	Best Supporting Actor	Taranath Khiratkar	Won	
Maharashtra State Film Awards	2026	Best Editing	Abhijit Deshpande	Won	
Maharashtra State Film Awards	2026	Best Sound Editing	Sanjay Chaturvedi	Won	
Maharashtra Times Sanman	2026	Best Film	Sthal	Nominated	
Maharashtra Times Sanman	2026	Best Director	Jayant Digambar Somalkar	Nominated	
Maharashtra Times Sanman	2026	Best Actress	Nandini Chikte	Nominated	
New York Indian Film Festival	2024	Best Film	A Match	Nominated	
New York Indian Film Festival	2024	Best Debut Film	Jayant Digambar Somalkar	Nominated	
New York Indian Film Festival	2024	Best Actress	Nandini Chikte	Nominated	
Pune International Film Festival	2024	Best International Marathi Film (Marathi Competition)	A Match	Won	
Pune International Film Festival	2024	Best Screenplay (Marathi Competition)	Jayant Digambar Somalkar	Won	
Third Eye Asian Film Festival	2024	Best Film (Marathi Competition)	A Match	Won	
Third Eye Asian Film Festival	2024	Best Actress (Marathi Competition)	Nandini Chikte	Won	
Toronto International Film Festival	2023	NETPAC Award	Jayant Digambar Somalkar	Won	
Zee Chitra Gaurav Puraskar	2026	Best Film	Sthal	Nominated	
Zee Chitra Gaurav Puraskar	2026	Best Director	Jayant Digambar Somalkar	Nominated	
Zee Chitra Gaurav Puraskar	2026	Best Story	Jayant Digambar Somalkar	Nominated	
Zee Chitra Gaurav Puraskar	2026	Best Screenplay	Jayant Digambar Somalkar	Nominated	
Zee Chitra Gaurav Puraskar	2026	Best Dialogue	Jayant Digambar Somalkar	Nominated	
Zee Chitra Gaurav Puraskar	2026	Best Supporting Actor	Taranath Khiratkar	Nominated	
Zee Chitra Gaurav Puraskar	2026	Best Breakthrough Debut Actor	Taranath Khiratkar	Won	
Zee Chitra Gaurav Puraskar	2026	Best Breakthrough Debut Actress	Nandini Chikte	Won	
Zee Chitra Gaurav Puraskar	2026	Best Background Score	Madhav Agarwal	Nominated	
Zee Chitra Gaurav Puraskar	2026	Best Cinematography	Manoj Karmarkar	Nominated	
Zee Chitra Gaurav Puraskar	2026	Best Editor	Abhijeet Deshpande	Nominated	
Zee Chitra Gaurav Puraskar	2026	Best Sound Recordist	Sanjay Chaturvedi	Nominated	
