= Sangeet Manapmaan =

2025 Indian Marathi musical drama film by Subodh Bhave

- Promotional poster
- Directed by: Subodh Bhave
- Written by: Shirish Gopal Deshpande; Urja Deshpande; Prajakt Deshmukh
- Produced by: Jyoti Deshpande; Sunil Phadtare
- Starring: Subodh Bhave; Sumeet Raghavan; Vaidehi Parshurami
- Cinematography: Sudheer Palsane
- Edited by: Ashish Mhatre
- Music by: Shankar–Ehsaan–Loy; Santosh Mulekar
- Production companies: Jio Studios; Shree Ganesh Marketing And Films
- Distributed by: UTV Motion Pictures
- Release date: 10 January 2025
- Running time: 165 minutes
- Country: India
- Language: Marathi

Sangeet Manapmaan (transl. The Musical Honor and Dishonor) is a 2025 Indian Marathi-language epic musical film directed by Subodh Bhave. The film stars Subodh Bhave, Sumeet Raghavan and Vaidehi Parshurami in lead roles, with Nivedita Saraf, Upendra Limaye, Neena Kulkarni and Shailesh Datar in supporting roles. It is jointly produced by Jyoti Deshpande and Sunil Phadtare under their banners, Jio Studios and Shree Ganesh Marketing and Films. Sangeet Manapmaan is an adaptation of the classic play of the same name by Krishnaji Prabhakar Khadilkar, exploring themes of love, jealousy, courage, honor, and humiliation between the trio Dhairyadhar, Bhamini, and Chandravilas.

The film was officially announced on 12 November 2022, initially titled Manapmaan. Principal photography began a year later in September 2023 and wrapped by late November 2023. The film features music composed by the trio Shankar–Ehsaan–Loy, cinematography handled by Sudheer Palsane and editing by Ashish Mhatre.

The film was released worldwide on 10 January 2025 and received reviews from critics and audiences, with mentions of its performances, music, production design, screenplay, and cinematography.

== Cast ==
- Subodh Bhave as Dhairyadhar
- Sumeet Raghavan as Chandravilas
- Vaidehi Parshurami as Bhamini
- Nivedita Saraf as Rani Sarkar Vijayalaxmi
- Upendra Limaye as Khushalpur Naresh Dhiren
- Neena Kulkarni as Chimnabai
- Shailesh Datar as Senapati Kakasaheb
- Archana Nipankar as Kusum
- Jitendra Agarkar as Chakri
- Umesh Bolke as Narsinh
- Priyapal Darshati as Deva
- Amarnath Kharade as Shyama
- Pranav Prabhakar as Baiju
- Akash Mohite as Kanta
- Shubham Govilkar as Raya
- Keya Ingle as Gauri
- Smital Chavan as Gauri's mother
- Niranjan Jabir as Gauri's father
- Amruta Khanvilkar in a guest appearance in the song "Vandan Ho"
- Shankar Mahadevan in a guest appearance in the song "Hrutu Vasant"
- Bela Shende in a guest appearance in the song "Hrutu Vasant"

== Production ==
"My favorite place where I get a lot of positive energy, inspiration and do good work in life is FTII Pune. Katyar Kaljat Ghusali, Ani... Dr. Kashinath Ghanekar and one of my web series muhurat was done here under this very tree."

— Subodh Bhave speaking about the muhurat in an interview with The Times of India

The film marks Bhave's return to direction after nearly a decade, following his acclaimed 2015 debut with the musical drama Katyar Kaljat Ghusali. Initially announced in 2022 on the seventh anniversary of Katyar Kaljat Ghusali under the title Manapmaan, the film's cast was kept under wraps, with only Bhave confirmed to play the lead role. The script for the film took about three and a half years and went through 26 drafts to be finished, making sure the story was perfect. The ceremonial mahurat shot took place at the prestigious Film and Television Institute of India (FTII) in Pune in September 2023. The costumes for the film were designed by the renowned designer Nachiket Barve.

The production later moved to scenic locations across Maharashtra, capturing the beauty of the state in areas such as Bhor, Mahabaleshwar, and Kolhapur. To maintain the serene atmosphere of the era depicted in the story, mobile phones were banned on set, allowing the cast and crew to fully immerse themselves in the calmness of that time period. The fourth schedule wrapped up at the end of November 2023. In mid-November, the trio of singers Shankar Mahadevan, Rahul Deshpande, and Mahesh Kale, who had previously worked together in Bhave's directorial debut film, shot the promotional music video for the song "Vandan Ho" in Mumbai. The film version of "Vandan Ho" was shot over two days in Orchha, Madhya Pradesh.

== Soundtrack ==
The soundtrack album is composed by Shankar–Ehsaan–Loy, marking their second collaboration with Bhave, and lyrics were written by Sameer Samant, while the original songs, written by Krushnaji Prabhakar Khadilkar and originally composed by Govindrao Tembe, were revived for the film. Santosh Mulekar composed the background score. The album features 14 songs, performed by a remarkable lineup of 16 veteran singers, including Shankar Mahadevan, Anand Bhate, Savani Ravindra, Rahul Deshpande, Priyanka Barve, Shounak Abhisheki, Mahesh Kale, Avadhoot Gupte and Arya Ambekar.

== Marketing and release ==
On 12 March 2024, marking the 113th anniversary of the original play's stage debut, the makers announced that the film will release on 1 November 2024, coinciding with Diwali. The first look of Bhave in the film was unveiled through a motion poster on the occasion of Gudi Padwa. However, the release date was later postponed to 10 January 2025, with the new date revealed in a poster featuring the three main leads. The film's teaser was released on 1 November 2024 and was attached to Rohit Shetty's multi-starrer Singham Again in theaters. On 21 November 2024, the team released their first song "Vandan Ho", featuring the three singers Shankar Mahadevan, Rahul Deshpande, and Mahesh Kale. A music launch event was held on 25 November 2024, in the presence of the film's musicians, choreographers, and the cast and crew, at the Lok Shaheer Anna Bhau Sathe Auditorium, Byculla. The event also showcased a harmonium that was over 125 years old, once used by Govindrao Tembe, who had composed the music for the original play. Subsequently, songs "Shura Mee Vandile", "Neet Paha", "Sangu Kasa Me" and "Hrutu Vasant" were released, which generated much hype for the film. On New Year's Day 2025, the grand title track "Vandan Ho," featuring Amruta Khanvilkar and choreographed by Deepali Vichare, was unveiled. Four days before the film's release, a romantic song picturized on the characters Dhairyadhar and Vanmala, sung by Sonu Nigam, was released, further amplifying anticipation for the film.

A grand trailer launch event was held on 23 December 2024 in Mumbai, where the newly elected Chief Minister of Maharashtra, Devendra Fadnavis, was present along with the cast and crew members, including Vaidehi Parshurami, Sumeet Raghavan, Amruta Khanvilkar, Shankar Mahadevan, Nivedita Saraf, Jyoti Deshpande, and others. The three-and-a-half-minute trailer showcased aspects of love, bravery, courage, honor, and humiliation.

== Reception ==
=== Critical acclaim ===
Santosh Bhingarde of ESakal described the film as a "great gift of art" and praised its elements, saying, "This musical love story is beautifully complemented by magnificent, divine sets, strong and effortless acting, exceptional art direction, stunning costumes, and melodious music." Jaydeep Pathakji of The Times of India rated the film 3 out of 5 stars, comparing it to Bhave's directorial debut, Katyar Kaljat Ghusali (KKG), he noted, "One thing that stands out is the mix of new and old songs which happened seamlessly in KKG, but not here. That said, the songs in themselves are beautiful." Summing up his review, he wrote, "This is a film that you can savour with your eyes and ears, albeit with a little amount of patience." Maharashtra Times appreciated the film's production values, performances, music, and technical aspects, stating, "The grandeur of the film is the strong point of the film." Ashish Ningurkar of MyMahanagar praised the film in his positive review, stating, "With a grand ensemble of talented artists and exceptional singers, Sangeet Manapman has the potential to resonate worldwide, much like Baahubali." Reshma Raikwar of Loksatta wrote, "The combined efforts of acting, screenplay, and music make the fairy tale in Sangeet Manapaman, though not perfect, definitely an innovative experience."

Devendra Jadhav of Lokmat Filmy awarded the film 3 out of 5 stars, criticizing its predictability and length, he wrote, "The hard work and creativity are appreciated but somewhere after the movie ends, there is a disappointment in the mind."

Nandini Ramnath of Scroll.in also criticized the film's length but acknowledged its musical strengths, stating, "Bhave leans heavily on composers Shankar-Ehsaan-Loy to bring Sangeet Manapmaan to life on the big screen. However, the overall lack of attention to the fundamentals of period productions is evident."

=== Accolades ===
Year	Award	Category	Nominee (s)	Result	Ref.
2026	Zee Chitra Gaurav Puraskar	Best Actress	Vaidehi Parshurami	Nominated	
2026	Zee Chitra Gaurav Puraskar	Medimix Natural Talent of the Year	Vaidehi Parshurami	Won	
2026	Zee Chitra Gaurav Puraskar	Best Music Director	Shankar–Ehsaan–Loy	Nominated	
2026	Zee Chitra Gaurav Puraskar	Best Playback Singer Female	Aarya Ambekar ("Mala Madan Bhase")	Nominated	
2026	Zee Chitra Gaurav Puraskar	Best Playback Singer Female	Priyanka Barve ("Naahi Me Bolat")	Nominated	
2026	Maharashtra State Film Awards	Best Art Director	Santosh Phutane	Won	
2026	Maharashtra State Film Awards	Best Background Score	Santosh Mulekar	Won	
2026	Indian National Cine Academy Awards	Best Actress – Marathi	Vaidehi Parshurami	Nominated	
2026	City Cine Awards Marathi	Best Singer – Female	Aarya Ambekar ("Mala Madan Bhase")	Pending	
