= Swargandharva Sudhir Phadke =

- Theatrical release poster
- Marathi: स्वरगंधर्व सुधीर फडके
- Directed by: Yogesh Deshpande
- Written by: Yogesh Deshpande
- Produced by: Saurabh Gadgil; Yogesh Deshpande
- Starring: Sunil Barve; Adish Vaidya; Sharad Ponkshe; Mrunmayee Deshpande; Sagar Talashikar; Apurva Modak; Avinash Narkar; Sukhada khandkekar
- Cinematography: Mahesh Aney; Saumitra Yadnyopavit
- Edited by: Faisal Mahadik
- Music by: Sudhir Phadke
- Production company: ReDefine Productions
- Release date: 1 May 2024
- Running time: 169 minutes
- Country: India
- Language: Marathi

Swargandharva Sudhir Phadke is a 2024 Indian Marathi-language musical biographical film based on Marathi Music director and Singer Sudhir Phadke. It is directed by Yogesh Deshpande and produced by ReDefine Productions, featuring Sunil Barve, Adish Vaidya, Sharad Ponkshe, Mrunmayee Deshpande, Sagar Talashikar, Apoorva Modak, Avinash Narkar.

== Plot ==
The film is real life story of Sudhir Phadke.

== Cast ==
- Sunil Barve as Sudhir Phadke
  - Adish Vaidya as young Sudhir Phadke
- Mrunmayee Deshpande as Lalita Phadke
- Sagar Talashikar as G. D. Madgulkar
- Sharad Ponkshe as K. B. Hedgewar
- Milind Phatak as Raja Paranjape
- Sukhada Khandkekar as Manik Varma
- Dheresh Joshi as Vinayak Damodar Savarkar
- Apoorva Modak Asha Bhosle
- Nikhil Raut as Mohammad Rafi
- Nirajan Parandkar as Kishore Kumar
- Nikhil Rajeshirke as young Shridhar Phadke
- Vibhavari Deshpande
- Hrishikesh Joshi as Atal Bihari Vajpayee
- Suraj Kalyankar as Punjabi Swayamsevak
- Prasanna Ketkar as Sangha practitioner
- Chinmay Patwardhan as Nana
- Paritosh Pradhan as Interviewer in show
- Bhushan Telang
- Avinash Narkar as Theatre Director
- Uday Sabnis

== Production ==
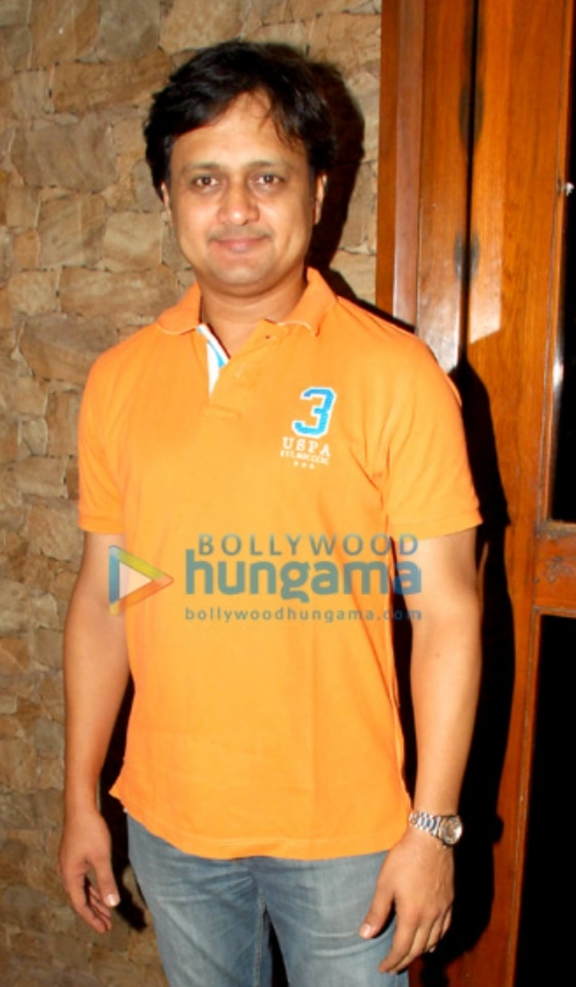
Sunil Barve played the role of Sudhir Phadke.

The film was officially announced on 25 July 2023 on the occasion of Phadke's birth anniversary at an event in the Swatantrya Veer Savarkar Memorial Hall in Mumbai. Former Governor of Uttar Pradesh Ram Naik was present as the Chief Guest. Sunil Barve was confirmed for portraying the role of Babuji (Sudhir Phadke) and the young Babuji is playing by Adish Vaidya making his debut in Marathi cinema with the film.

== Soundtrack ==
Swargandharva Sudhir Phadke

Soundtrack album by Sudhir Phadke
- Released: 2024
- Genre: Feature film soundtrack
- Language: Marathi
- Label: Saregama India limited

Official audio
- Swargandharva Sudhir Phadke - Full Album

All tracks are written by G D Madgulkar, Sudhir Phadke, Shridhar Phadke, Yashwant Deo.

Track listing
| No. | Title | Singer (s) | Length |
|---|---|---|---|
| 1. | "Jivalaga Kadhi Re" | Asha Bhosale, Sudhir Phadke | 2:57 |
| 2. | "Paradhin Aahey" | Sudhir Phadke | 2:31 |
| 3. | "Toch Chandrama Nabhatla" | Sudhir Phadke | 2:00 |
| 4. | "Dev Devhyaryat Nahi" | Sudhir Phadke | 2:06 |
| 5. | "Dhundhi Kalyana" | Asha Bhosale, Sudhir Phadke | 0:56 |
| 6. | "Jag He BandhiShala" | Sudhir Phadke | 1:33 |
| 7. | "Phite Andharache Jale" | Sudhir Phadke; Asha Bhosale | 2:47 |
| 8. | "Ek Dhagaa Sukhacha" | Sudhir Phadke | 3:31 |
| 9. | "Ha Maza Marg" | Sudhir Phadke | 3:34 |
| 10. | "Jyoti Kalash" | Lata Mangeshkar; Sudhir Phadke | 0:58 |
| 11. | "Sant Vahate" | Sudhir Phadke; Datta Davjekar | 2:17 |
| 12. | "Vithala tu Veda" | Sudhir Phadke | 1:33 |
| 13. | "Swar Ale Duruni" | Sudhir Phadke; Prabhakar Jog | 2:04 |

== Release ==
=== Theatrical ===
The film was theatrically released on 1 May 2024, coinciding Maharashtra Day.

=== Marketing ===
The film teaser of the film was released on 21 January 2024, second teaser was revealed on 11 March 2024, makers announced release date with this 1 minute 15 second long teaser.

== Reception ==
=== Critical reception ===
Vaibhav Vaze of Maharashtra Times awarded 3.5 stars out of 5 stars, the reviewer highlighting the unique narrative structure of the film, where different characters take turns narrating the story based on the context. Anub George of The Times of India rated 3 stars out of 5 stars The reviewer is acknowledging that while the story of the film might have its shortcomings, he believe that the exceptional cinematography and production quality compensate for them. Prerana Jangam of Sakal awarded 3 stars out of 5 stars, and she praised the film for providing a great cinematic experience, attributing it to the quality of cinematography and editing. The reviewer also commend the actors' performances, as well as the attention to detail in costumes, makeup, and set design, which effectively recreate the period on screen. However, she acknowledge some flaws, particularly in the effectiveness of certain dialogues and the slow pacing at the beginning of the film. Reshma Raikwar of Loksatta expressed some disorientation with the emphasis on political ideologies over songs and the inconsistency in portraying Babuji's voice. Despite these issues, she observed that the film is seen as providing a satisfying educational experience about Sudhir Phadke's extraordinary talent, compositions, and ideological views. Jyoti Venkatesh of Cine Blitz rated 2 stars out of 5 stars, acknowledged the appeal of Phadke's music and the visual aesthetics provided by the cinematography and points out flaws in the film, such as its slow pace, poor screenplay leading to uneven pacing, and the inclusion of Sudhir Phadke's political inclinations, which may not resonate with all viewers.

=== Box office ===
The film opened with collection of ₹50 lakh (US$52,000).

=== Accolades ===
| Year | Award | Category | Nominee (s) | Result | Ref. |
|---|---|---|---|---|---|
| 2024 | Aaryans Sanman | Best Actor | Sunil Barve | Nominated | |
| 2024 | Aaryans Sanman | Best Actress | Mrunmayee Deshpande | Nominated | |
| 2024 | Aaryans Sanman | Best Art Director | Mahesh Kore | Nominated | |
| 2024 | Aaryans Sanman | Best Makeup Artist | Saurabh Kapde | Won | |
| 2024 | Aaryans Sanman | Best Custom Designer | Sachin Lovalekar | Nominated | |
| 2024 | City Cine Awards | Best Actress | Mrunmayee Deshpande | Nominated | |
| 2025 | Filmfare Awards Marathi | Best Actor Critics | Sunil Barve | Nominated | |
| 2025 | Filmfare Awards Marathi | Best Costume Design | Sachin Lovalekar | Nominated | |
| 2026 | National Film Awards | Best Screenplay (Adapted) | Yogesh Deshpande | Won | |
| 2026 | Maharashtra State Film Awards | Best Film | Swargandharva Sudhir Phadke | Nominated | |
| 2026 | Maharashtra State Film Awards | Best Director | Yogesh Deshpande | Nominated | |
| 2026 | Maharashtra State Film Awards | Best Actor | Sunil Barve | Won | |
| 2026 | Maharashtra State Film Awards | Best Debut Actor | Adish Vaidya | Won | |
| 2026 | Maharashtra State Film Awards | Best Cinematography | Mahesh Aney | Won | |
| 2026 | Maharashtra State Film Awards | Best Art Direction | Mahesh Kore | Won | |
