= Maharashtra State Film Award for Best Lyricist =

Indian film award

Maharashtra State Film Awards for Best Lyricist
- Awarded for: Best Lyricist
- Country: India
- Presented by: Government of Maharashtra
- Reward: ₹50,000
- First award: G. D. Madgulkar, Prapanch (1962)

The Maharashtra State Film Award for Best Lyrics is an honour established in 1962, and presented at the Maharashtra State Film Awards for best lyrics in Marathi-language films. The first recipient of the award was G. D. Madgulkar.

== Winners ==
Year	Recipient	Songs	Film	Ref
1962	G. D. Madgulkar	"Uth Zala Pratahkal"	Shahir Parshuram	
1963	G. D. Madgulkar	"Kadhi Tari Yaave Tumhi Ya Gharat"	Garibagharchi Lek	
1964	G. D. Madgulkar	"Gomu Maherla Jaate Ho Nakhva"	Vaishakh Vanava	
1965	Jagdish Khebudkar	"Kasa Kaay Patil"	Sawaal Majha Aika!	
1966	Jagdish Khebudkar	"Usala Lagal Kolha"	Kela Ishara Jata Jata	
1967	G. D. Madgulkar	"Santh Wahate Krishnamai"	Santh Wahate Krishnamai	
1968	Jagdish Khebudkar	"Dehachi Tijori"	Aamhi Jato Amuchya Gava	
1969	Jagdish Khebudkar	"Jugalbandi"	Gan Gavlan	
1970	G. D. Madgulkar	"Nandini"	Nandini	
1971	Suresh Bhat	"Malmali Tarunya Maze"	Gharkul	
1972	Jagdish Khebudkar	"Savdhan Hoi Vedya"	Bholi Bhabdi	
1974	Jagdish Khebudkar	"Kambar Lachakali"	Sugandhi Katta	
1975	Jagdish Khebudkar	"Ubhi Ashi Trailokya Sundari"	Bayanno Navre Sambhala	
1976	Dada Kondke	"Anjanichya Suta"	Tumcha Aamcha Jamala	
1977	Jagdish Khebudkar	"Sadhi Bholi Meera"	Bala Gau Kashi Angai	
1977	Madhusudan Kalelkar	"Nimbonichya Zadamage"	Bala Gau Kashi Angai	
1978	G. D. Madgulkar	"Chhini Hatodyacha Ghav Kari Dagadacha Dev"	Devki Nandan Gopala	
1979	Sudhir Moghe	"Visaru Nako Shrirama"	Janaki	
1980	Suresh Bhat	"Ushakal Hota Hota"	Sinhasan	
1981	Prof. Vitthal Wagh	"Kalya Matit Matit"	Are Sansar Sansar	
1982	Shanta Shelke	"Maay Dhartichya Daari"	Bhujang	
1983	Sudhir Moghe	"Phulala Sajira Sansar Phulala"	Thorli Jau	
1984	Vandana Vitankar	"Thakle Priya Kadhichi"	Chorachya Manat Chandana	
1985	Shrikant Narule	"Chunnuk Chunnuk Taal Vaajvi"	Fukat Chambu Baburao	
1986	Sudhir Moghe	"Ekach Hya Janmi Janu"	Pudhcha Paool	
1987	Namdeo Dhondo Mahanor	"Chimb Pavasana Raan Zala Abadani"	Sarja	
1988	Sudhir Moghe	"Rin Phitata Phitena"	Nashibwaan	
1989	Suresh Bhat	"Kevha Tari Pahate Ultun"	Nivdung	
1990	Raman Randive	"Ubhe Abhagi Jeevan Gaane"	Aaghat	
1991	Jagdish Khebudkar	"Z.P"	Z.P	
1992	Namdeo Dhondo Mahanor	"Mee Gatana Geet Tula Ladiwala"	Ek Hota Vidushak	
1993	Ramesh Aanavkar	"Saubhagya Kankan"	Saubhagya Kankan	
1994	Namdeo Dhondo Mahanor	"Tya Maziya"	Mukta	
1995	Namdeo Dhondo Mahanor	"Bhui Bhegalali Khol"	Doghi	
1996	Vijay Kuwlekar	"Jeevan Anandache Gaane"	Rao Saheb	
1997	Ajeya Zankar	"Alwar Tujhi Chahool"	Sarkarnama	
1998	Vijay Kuwlekar	"Jal Dahulale Bimb Haraple"	Tu Tithe Mee	
1999	Dasu Vaidya	"Bindhaast Ghe Shwaas"	Bindhaast	
2000	Prakash Holkar	"Sarja Raja"	Sarja Raja	
2001	Sanjay Churmure	"Ek Hoti Vadi"	Ek Hoti Vadi	
2002	Sunil Sukhtankar	"Kanhaiyya Asa Kasa Jashi"	Vastupurush	
2003	Gajendra Ahire	"Savlit Majhya"	Not Only Mrs. Raut	
2004	Graes	"Paus Aala Udhaluni"	Sail	
2005	Shrirang Godbole	"Pak Pak Pakaak"	Pak Pak Pakaak	
2006	Ashok Bagwe	"Gojiri"	Gojiri	
2007	Prakash Holkar	"Maze Aabhar Tula Ghe"	Tingya	
2008	Sanjay Krushnaji Patil	"Jeev Rangla"	Jogwa	
2009	Prakash Holkar	"Asa Kasa Jeev Bai"	Baboo Band Baaja	
2010	Guru Thakur	"Khel Mandala"	Natarang	
2011	Arvind Jagtap	"Ghar Tari Dista Kaay"	Dambis	
2012	Namdeo Dhondo Mahanor	"Shabdat Gothale Dukkha"	Ajintha	
2013	Prakash Holkar	"Man Mohrun Aala"	Tapaal	
2014	Sambhaji Bhagat	"Dhaklat"	Nagrik	
2015	Subodh Pawar & Sayyad Akhtar	"Maula Maula Mere Maula"	Halal	
2016	Sanjay Krushnaji Patil	"Jagnyache Deva"	Dashakriya	
2017	Vaibhav Joshi	"Bhetate Ti Ashi"	Asehi Ekada Vhave	
2018	Sanjay Krushnaji Patil	"Kalokhachya Watevarti"	Bandishala	
2019	Sanjay Krushnaji Patil	"Jagana Hey Nyaar Zala Ji"	Hirkani	
2020	Guru Thakur	"Umgaya Baap Ra"	Baaplyok	
2021	Jitendra Joshi	"Khal Khal Goda"	Godavari	
2022	Abhishek Khankar	"Dhaga Aad Yaa"	Ananya	
2023	Vaibhav Deshmukh	"Bhingori"	Naal 2	
2024	Rocksun	"Lal Chikhali"	Navardev Bsc. Agri.	

== Multiple wins ==
Individuals with two or more Best lyricist awards:

Wins	Recipients
9	Jagdish Khebudkar
6	G. D. Madgulkar
5	Namdeo Dhondo Mahanor
4	Sudhir Moghe; Prakash Holkar; Sanjay Krushnaji Patil
3	Suresh Bhat
2	Guru Thakur; Vijay Kuwlekar; Vandana Vitankar
