= Maharashtra State Film Award for Best Editing =

Indian film award

- Awarded for: Best editing in a Marathi film
- Reward: ₹100,000 (US$1,100)
- First award: 1962
- Final award: 2024

Highlights
- Total awarded: 61
- First winner: Bal Korde
- Last winner: Abhijeet Deshpande; Vijay Kalamkar

The Maharashtra State Film Award for Best Editing is an award, begun in 1962, presented annually at the Maharashtra State Film Awards of India to an actor for best performance in a Marathi cinema. The awardees are decided by a jury constituted every year. Their names are announced by the Minister for Cultural Affairs and they receive their awards from the Chief Minister.

== Winners ==
Year	Recipient(s)	Film	Ref.
1962	Bal Korde	Suvasini	
1963	Bal Korde	Rangalya Ratri Asha	
1964	Bal Korde	Pathlaag	
1965	Chandrashekhar Kamulkar	Vavtal	
1966	Gangaram Matafod	Kela Ishara Jata Jata	
1967	Bal Korde	Kaka Mala Vachva	
1968	V. K. Naik	Ektee	
1969	Ramnath Ghatke	Tila Lavte Mi Raktacha	
1970	N. S. Vaidya	Saticha Vaan	
1971	Babu Shaikh	Shantata! Court Chalu Aahe	
1971	V. K. Naik	Ajab Tujhe Sarkar	
1972-73	P. S. Wagle	Jawai Vikat Ghene Aahe	
1972-73	N. S. Vaidya	Andhala Marto Dola	
1974	Pandurang Khochikar	Sugandhi Katta	
1975	N. S. Vaidya	Pandu Havaldar	
1975	Baburao Bhosle	Ghar Gangechya Kathi	
1976	V. Shantaram	Zunj	
1977	Ramnath Ghatke	Daga	
1978	Ramnath Ghatke	Devkinandan Gopala	
1979	Pandurang Khochikar	Irsha	
1980	Aruna-Vikas	Zakol	
1981	N. S. Vaidya	Umbartha	
1982	Das Dhaimade	Shapit	
1983	Sanjeev Naik	Gupchup Gupchup	
1984	Ashok Patwardhan	Hech Maze Maher	
1985	N. S. Vaidya	Dhum Dhadaka	
1986	S. B. Mane	Aaj Zale Mukt Me	
1987	Ashok Patwardhan	Prem Karuya Khullam Khulla	
1988	Javed Sayyad	Reshimgathi	
1989	Vishwas-Anil	Thartharat	
1990	Ashok Patwardhan	Ek Ratra Mantarleli	
1991	G. G. Patil	Vedh	
1992	Anant Dharmadhikari	Aahuti	
1993	Vishwas-Anil	Savat Mazi Ladki	
1994	Vijay Khochikar	Mukta	
1995	Vijay Khochikar	Nilambari	
1996	Suresh Avadhoot	Raosaheb	
1997	Jafar Sultan	Sarkarnama	
1997	Dilip Kotalgi	Sarkarnama	
1998	Vijay Khochikar	Andhala Sakshidar	
1999	Jafar Sultan	Bindhaast	
1999	Dilip Kotalgi	Bindhaast	
2000	Anand Gurav	Tochi Ek Samarth	
2001	Arun Narvekar	Ek Hoti Vadi	
2002	Vishwas-Anil	Sattesathi Kahihi	
2003	Vyanktesh Rao	Chalu Navra Bholi Bayko	
2004	Shailendra Doke	Kunku Zale Vairi	
2005	Faisal-Imran	Pak Pak Pakaak	
2006	Dilip Kotalgi	Mohatyachi Renuka	
2007	Rajesh Rao	Checkmate	
2008	Vidyadhar Pathare	Savariya Dot Com	
2009	Sarvesh Parab	Mi Shivajiraje Bhosale Boltoy!	
2010	Prakash Jadhav	Ramabai Bhimrao Ambedkar	
2011	Faisal-Imran	Arjun	
2012	Prashant Khedekar	Ajintha	
2013	Deepak Virkut	Ranabhoomi	
2013	Vilas Ranade	Ranabhoomi	
2014	Jayant Jathar	Happy Journey	
2015	Kshitija Khandagale	Dagadi Chawl	
2016	Mahenteshwar Bhosge	Phuntroo	
2016	Anil Gandhi	Machivarla Budha	
2017	Devendra Murdeshwar	Ziprya	
2018	Nachiket Waikar	Tendlya	
2019	Apurva Motiwale	Basta	
2019	Ashish Mhatre	Basta	
2020	Manish Shirke	Goshta Eka Paithanichi	
2021	Paresh Manjrekar	Luckdown Be Positive	
2022	Yash Surve	Kata Kirr	
2023	Akshay Shinde	Gypsy	
2024	Abhijeet Deshpande	Sthal	
2024	Vijay Kalamkar	Kurla To Vengurla	

== Multiple wins ==
Individuals with two or more Best Editing awards:

Wins	Actress
5	N. S. Vaidya
4	Bal Korde
3	Ramnath Ghatke; Ashok Patwardhan; Vishwas-Anil; Vijay Khochikar; Dilip Kotalgi
2	V. K. Naik; Jafar Sultan; Pandurang Khochikar; Faisal-Imran
