= Maharashtra State Film Award for Best Actor =

Indian film award

- Native name: Shahu Modak Award for Best Actor
- Awarded for: Best performance by an actor in a leading role in a Marathi film
- Sponsored by: Ministry of Cultural Affairs (Maharashtra)
- Reward: ₹100,000 (US$1,100)
- First award: 1962
- Final award: 2024

Highlights
- Most awards: Ashok Saraf (5)
- Total awarded: 62
- First winner: Gajanan Jagirdar, Shahir Parshuram (1962)

The Maharashtra State Film Award for Best Actor is an honour presented annually at the Maharashtra State Film Awards to recognize an actor for the best performance in a leading role in a Marathi film. The award was established in 1962, and the recipients are selected by a jury constituted each year by the Government of Maharashtra. They are announced by the Minister for Cultural Affairs and presented by the Chief Minister of Maharashtra. Over the course of 62 award ceremonies, accounting for ties and repeat winners, the award has been presented to 44 different actors. The award was later renamed the Shahu Modak Award for Best Actor, in honour of Shahu Modak, one of the most celebrated actors of Indian and Marathi cinema. Recipients receive a statuette and a cash prize of ₹1 lakh (US$1,000).

== Achievement records ==
=== Multiple wins ===
Individuals with two or more Best Actor awards:

Wins	Actor
5	Ashok Saraf
3	Arun Sarnaik; Nilu Phule; Subodh Bhave; Yashwant Dutt
2	Chandrakant Gokhale; Nana Patekar; Dilip Prabhavalkar; Shivaji Satam; Sachin Khedekar; Shashank Shende

=== Other achievement records ===
Achievement	Actor	Record
Most consecutive wins	Nilu Phule (1974–1976)	3
Eldest winner	Gajanan Jagirdar (1962); Chandrakant Mandare (1968)	age 55
Youngest winner	Sachin Pilgaonkar (1971)	age 14

- Nilu Phule holds the record for the most consecutive Best Actor wins, taking the award three years in a row from 1974 to 1976. Apart from him, Ashok Saraf (1992–1993) and Subodh Bhave (2011–2012) are the only others to have won in back-to-back years.
- A total of 18 actors have received both the Best Actor and Best Supporting Actor awards: Chandrakant Gokhale, Gajanan Jagirdar, Chandrakant Mandare, Sharad Talwalkar, Nilu Phule, Ashok Saraf, Shreeram Lagoo, Mohan Gokhale, Ajinkya Deo, Yashwant Dutt, Vikram Gokhale, Avinash Narkar, Dilip Prabhavalkar, Mohan Joshi, Arun Nalawade, Sandeep Kulkarni, Kishor Kadam and Amey Wagh.
- Ashok Saraf is the most decorated actor in this category with five Best Actor wins, and is the only actor to have won the award across four different decades.
- The award has been won by real-life brothers Suryakant Mandhare and Chandrakant Mandare on separate occasions. It has also been won by the father-son pair of Chandrakant Gokhale and Vikram Gokhale.
- Amol Palekar is among the few to have won both the Best Actor and Best Director awards, including for the same film, Akriet. Sachin Pilgaonkar is the only other actor to have won both awards, along with the Best Child Artist award. Vikram Gokhale later added the Best Debut Director award to his name.
- Dilip Prabhavalkar, Ashok Saraf, Mohan Joshi, Jitendra Joshi and Upendra Limaye have each won both the Best Actor and Best Comedian awards. Mohan Joshi, Sandeep Kulkarni and Umesh Kamat have additionally been honoured with the Special Jury Award.\
- Sachin Pilgaonkar remains the youngest Best Actor recipient, having won the award at the age of 14 for Ajab Tujhe Sarkar (1971). Gajanan Jagirdar and Chandrakant Mandare are the oldest recipients, having won for Shahir Parshuram (1962) and Khandobachi Aan (1968) respectively.

== Winners and nominees ==
List of award recipients, showing the year, role(s) and film(s)
Year	Photos of winners	Recipient(s)	Role(s)	Work(s)	Refs.
1962		Gajanan Jagirdar	Parshuram	Shahir Parshuram	
1963		Arun Sarnaik	Yashwant	Rangalya Ratri Asha	
1964		Kashinath Ghanekar	Balasaheb Panse	Pathlaag	
1965		Arun Sarnaik	Jayawanta	Sawaal Majha Aika!	
1966		Suryakant Mandhare	Gulab	Malhari Martand	
1967		Chandrakant Gokhale	Chandrakant	Swapna Tech Lochani	
1968		Chandrakant Mandare	Shiva	Khandobachi Aan	
1969		Chandrakant Gokhale	Shivram Bhatikar	Dharmakanya	
1970		Arun Sarnaik	Madhav	Dhakti Bahin	
1971		Sachin Pilgaonkar	Uddhav	Ajab Tujhe Sarkar	
1972–73		Sharad Talwalkar	Pant	Jawai Vikat Ghene Aahe	
1974		Nilu Phule	Nilu	Haath Lavin Titha Sona	
1975		Nilu Phule	Hindurao Dhonde Patil	Samna	
1976		Nilu Phule	Chanderrao	Choricha Mamla	
1977		Yashwant Dutt	Maya	Daga	
1978		Shreeram Lagoo	Gadge Baba	Devaki Nandan Gopala	
1979		Ashok Saraf	Avinash	Baeelveda	
1980		Yashwant Dutt	Shrikanth Manohar	Sansar	
1981		Amol Palekar	Mukutrao Shinde	Akrit	
1982		Yashwant Dutt	Bali	Shapit	
1983		Nana Patekar	Raghu	Raghu Maina	
1984		Ashok Saraf	Sawalya (Bhau Kaka)	Bahurupi	
1985		Nana Patekar	Khandu	Gad Jejuri Jejuri	
1986		Mohan Gokhale	Shrikant B. Mahajan	Aaj Zale Mukt Mi	
1987		Ashok Saraf	Bajrang	Prem Karuya Khullam Khulla	
1988		Laxmikant Berde	Sachin Damodar	Gholat Ghol	
1989		Vikram Gokhale	Manohar Desai	Kalat Nakalat	
1990		Pramod Pawar		Aaghat	
1991		Dilip Prabhavalkar	Nandu	Chaukat Raja	
1992		Ashok Saraf	Raghunath	Aapli Mansa	
1993		Ashok Saraf	CM Babasaheb Mohile	Vazir	
1994		Ravindra Mankani	Srirang	Limited Manuski	
1995		Dilip Kulkarni	Avinash Pradhan	Aai	
1996		Mohan Joshi	Rao Saheb	Rao Saheb	
1997		Avinash Narkar	Shambhu	Paij Lagnachi	
1998		Dilip Prabhavalkar	Shridhar Phadke	Ratra Aarambh	
1999		Sachin Khedekar	Vasudha's brother	Gharabaher	
2000		Kishor Kadam	Raghunath Karve	Dhyaas Parva	
2001		Shivaji Satam	Doctor	Ek Hoti Vaadi	
2002		Shreyas Talpade	Deven	Resham Gaath	
2003		Arun Nalawade	Vichare Aajoba	Shwaas	
2004		Shivaji Satam	Raghuvir Rajadhyaksha / Raghu	Uttarayan	
2005		Sandeep Kulkarni	Madhav Apte	Dombivli Fast	
2006		Umesh Kamat	Samar	Samar – Ek Sangharsha	
2007		Ajinkya Deo	Vasudev Balwant Phadke / Kashikar Baba	Vasudev Balwant Phadke	
2008		Upendra Limaye	Tayappa	Jogwa	
2009		Bharat Jadhav	Mouli	Jhing Chik Jhing	
2010		Subodh Bhave	Lokesh Satam (Abhijeet Deshpande)	Ranbhool	
2011		Subodh Bhave	Bal Gandharva	Balgandharva	
2012		Sachin Khedekar	Hari Dada Damle	Kaksparsh	
2013		Ashok Lokhande	Yashwantrao Chavan	Yashwantrao Chavan: Bakhar Eka Vaadalaachi	
2014		Subodh Bhave	Bal Gangadhar Tilak	Lokmanya: Ek Yugpurush	
2015		Shashank Shende	Arjun Magar	Ringan	
2016		Mangesh Desai	Bhagwan Dada	Ekk Albela	
2017		Shashank Shende	Tatu	Redu	
2018		Kay Kay Menon	Malhar Raorane	Ek Sangaychay	
2019		Deepak Dobriyal	Madhav	Baba	
2019		Kailash Waghmare		Ghoda	
2019		Lalit Prabhakar	Gopalrao Joshi	Anandi Gopal	
2020		Rahul Deshpande	Vasantrao Deshpande	Me Vasantrao	
2020		Aroh Welankar	Heera	Funral	
2020		Siddharth Menon	Neel	June	
2021		Jitendra Joshi	Nishikant Deshmukh	Godavari	
2021		Sumeet Raghavan	Kiran	Ekda Kaay Zala	
2021		Sandeep Pathak	Dhanu	Raakh	
2022		Prasad Oak	Anand Dighe	Dharmaveer	
2022		Vaibhav Tatwawadi	Rohan	Pondicherry	
2022		Lalit Prabhakar	Sunny	Sunny	
2023		Amey Wagh	Jaggu Dada	Jaggu Ani Juliet	
2023		Shridhar Watsar	Daddy	Sshort and Ssweet	
2023		Siddharth Jadhav	Khandu	Hajar Vela Shole Pahilela Manus	
2024		Sunil Barve	Sudhir Phadke	Swargandharva Sudhir Phadke	
2024		Gashmeer Mahajani	Venkatdhwari Narsimha Shastri	Phullwanti	
2024		Milind Shinde	Raghunath	Ghaath	
