= Maharashtra State Film Award for Best Debut Actor =

Indian film award

- Awarded for: Debut Actor in a Marathi film
- Sponsored by: Maharashtra State Film Awards
- First award: 2015
- Final award: 2024

Highlights
- First winner: Gashmeer Mahajani
- Latest winner: Adish Vaidya

The Maharashtra State Film Award for Best Debut Actor is an award, presented annually at the Maharashtra State Film Awards of India to an actor for their debut performance in a Marathi cinema film.

== Winners ==
Year	Actress	Film	Ref.
2015	Gashmeer Mahajani	Carry On Maratha	
2016	Sangram Samel	Brave Heart	
2017	Rohit Phalke	Manjha	
2018	Firoz Shaikh	Tendlya	
2019	Ajit Khobragade	Zollywood	
2020	Ruturaj Wankhede	Jayanti	
2021	Yogesh Khilare	International Falamfok	
2022	Jaydeep Kodolikar	Hya Goshtila Navach Nahi	
2023	Deepak Joil	Bhera	
2024	Adish Vaidya	Swargandharva Sudhir Phadke	

== See also ==
- Maharashtra State Film Award for Best Actor
- Maharashtra State Film Award for Best Supporting Actor
