= Chabila =

2026 Marathi film

- Theatrical release poster
- Directed by: Anil Amrut Bhalerao
- Written by: Anil Amrut Bhalerao; Ajay Amrut Bhalerao
- Produced by: Ajay Amrut Bhalerao
- Starring: Swati Gotawale; Vinay Dhakde; Ajay Amrut; Rajkiran Kunkikar; Mahesh Ghungare
- Cinematography: Ajay Amrut Bhalerao
- Edited by: Vrushabh Panchal
- Music by: Rohit Nagbhide
- Production company: Lora Films
- Release date: January 2024 (PIFF)
- Running time: 107 minutes
- Country: India
- Language: Marathi

Chabila (transl. Attractive) is a 2024 Indian Marathi-language social film written and directed by Anil Amrut Bhalerao and produced by Ajay Amrut Bhalerao under the banner of Lora Films. It stars Swati Gotawale, Vinay Dhakde, Aditya Kerepatil, Ajay Amrut in lead roles. The film follows Ganya, a boy from a Laman community, whose mother wants him to study while his father expects him to work in the family’s stone quarry.

The film had its world premiere in 2024 at the Pune International Film Festival, where Swati Gotawale won the Best Actress Award. The film subsequently received recognition at the Asian Third Eye Film Festival. At the 62nd Maharashtra State Film Awards, the film also won six Maharashtra State Film Awards.

== Plot ==
Ganya, a young boy from the Laman community, lives with his family near a stone quarry where they work for their livelihood. While his father expects him to join the work, his mother Jana wants him to study and build a better future. The conflict between the family’s traditional way of life and Ganya’s desire for education forms the central story of the film.

== Cast ==
- Swati Gotawale as Jana
- Vinay Dhakde as Kisan
- Aditya Kerepatil as Ganya
- Kajal Pardesi as Dipi
- Arun Amrut as Anya
- Rajkiran Kunkikar as Ratya
- Mahesh Ghumare as Taru
- Bhagyashree Patil as Taru's wife
- Bhagyashree Malse as Sarla

== Reception ==
The film received positive reviews for its subject, performances and portrayal of the Laman community. Rasika Shinde-Paul from Mumbai Tarun Bharat praised the film for presenting the social and economic difficulties faced by the community and highlighted the performances of the cast. The review also noted that the film uses no songs and has minimal background music, keeping the focus on its story and characters. Tanay Gokhale of India Currents described the film as a “slow burn” set in the stone quarries of rural Maharashtra and praised its portrayal of nomadic labourers and the conflict between education and the need to earn a living.

The film was selected for the Marathi Competition at the 22nd Pune International Film Festival in 2024. It was also screened at the Brahmaputra Valley Film Festival, Third Eye Asian Film Festival, Ajanta-Ellora International Film Festival, Ahmedabad International Film Festival, Kolkata People's Choice Film Festival, Yashwantrao Chavan International Film Festival, Chitrapataka Film Festival, and Goa Film Festival.

== Accolades ==
Year	Award	Category	Recipient(s)	Ref.
2024	22nd Pune International Film Festival	Best Actress	Swati Gotawale	
2025	21st Third Eye Film Festival	Jury Special - Director	Anil Amrut Bhalerao	
2026	62nd Maharashtra State Film Awards	Best Film	Ajay Amrut Bhalerao	
2026	62nd Maharashtra State Film Awards	Best Director	Anil Amrut Bhalerao	
2026	62nd Maharashtra State Film Awards	Best Actress	Swati Gotawale	
2026	62nd Maharashtra State Film Awards	Best Debut Director	Anil Amrut Bhalerao	
2026	62nd Maharashtra State Film Awards	Best Sound Design	Satish Dadas	
