= Malgaon =

Village in Maharashtra

- Village
- Location in Maharashtra, India Malgaon (India)
- Coordinates: 16.86°N 74.71°E
- Country: India
- State: Maharashtra
- District: Sangli district
- Taluka: Miraj

Languages
  - Official: Marathi
- Time zone: UTC+5:30 (IST)
- PIN: 416410

Malgaon is a village in the Miraj taluka of Sangli district located in Maharashtra State, India.
