= Vishay Hard =

Indian romantic comedy film

- Theatrical release poster
- Directed by: Sumit Patil
- Screenplay by: Sumit Patil; Deepak Madekar
- Story by: Sumit Patil
- Produced by: Gitanjali Sarjerao Patil; Sarjerao Baburao Patil; Sumit Patil
- Starring: Sumit Patil; Parna Pethe
- Cinematography: Abhishek Shete; Jay Parikh
- Edited by: Sourabh Prabhudesai
- Music by: Sahil Kulkarni
- Production companies: Birdboy Entertainment; Kolhapur Talkies
- Distributed by: August Entertainment
- Release date: 5 July 2024
- Country: India
- Language: Marathi

Vishay Hard is a 2024 Indian Marathi-language romantic-comedy film directed by Sumit Patil, who co-wrote the screenplay with Deepak Madekar. The film is produced by Birdboy Entertainment and Kolhapur Talkies. The film starring Sumit Patil and Parna Pethe in the leading roles.

== Cast ==
- Sumit Patil as Sandya
  - Nihal Mirajkar as young Sandya
- Parna Pethe as Dolly
  - Adhishri as young Dolly
- Vipin Borate as Hawaldar Kishore
- Nitin Kulkarni as village police chief
- Hassan Sheikh as Shrinya
- Pratap Sonale as Manu driver
- Anand Ballal as Dolly's father
- Atul Savekar as Sandya father
- Rakesh Gath as Amrya
- Sagar Langote as Sashya
- Ravindra Kamat as Sarpanch
- Bhumi Patil as Barki

== Marketing and release ==
The first motion poster of the film was revealed on 16 May 2024. The teaser was released on 14 June 2024 and the trailer was released on 30 June 2024 on social media.

The film was theatrically released on 5 July 2024 across Maharashtra.

== Critical reception ==
Santosh Bhingarde of Sakal rated 3 stars out of 5 stars and acknowledging that while the film's pacing and screenplay falter in the second half, particularly due to its low budget and technical limitations, it still demonstrates the writer and director's effort and potential. Sanjay Ghaware of Lokmat rated 3 stars out of 5 stars and finds the screenplay by Sumit to be precise but slow-paced, and notes that the film's delayed release and title are detrimental. Anub George of The Times of India rated 2.5 stars out of 5 stars and wrote "A few twists and turns, and some comic relief help the film, but it's still not the best one in the genre out there."
