= Namdeo Dhondo Mahanor =

Indian poet (1942–2023)

- Born: 16 September 1942; Palaskhede, Aurangabad, Hyderabad State, British Raj
- Died: 3 August 2023 (aged 80); Pune, Maharashtra, India
- Awards: • Padma Shri (1991) • Sahitya Akademi Award (2000)

Namdeo Dhondo Mahanor (16 September 1942 – 3 August 2023) was an Indian poet, lyricist and farmer from Maharashtra. He was also a nominated member of Maharashtra Legislative Council.

In 1991, Mahanor was awarded the Padma Shri, the fourth-highest civilian honour of India, by the president of India. In addition to writing books, he wrote lyrics for Marathi films such as Jait re Jait, Doghi, and Ek Hota Vidushak.

Mahanor died in Pune on 3 August 2023, at the age of 80.

Poetry
Book name	Publication	Year
अजिंठा	Popular	1984
गंगा वाहू दे निर्मळ	Popular	2007
जगाला प्रेम अर्पावे	Popular	2005
पळसखेडची गाणी	Popular	1980
पक्ष्यांचे लक्ष्य थवे	Popular	1990
पानझड	Popular	1997
रानातल्या कविता	Popular	1967
वही		1970
पावसाळी कविता	Popular	1980
प्रार्थना दयाघाना		1990
तिची कहाणी		1999
गाथा शिवरायाची		1999
पुन्हा कविता		1965
पुन्हा एकदा कविता		1990
गंगा वाहू दे निर्मळ		2007
वाह्टूळ		2013
