= Bardo (2021 film) =

Marathi film

- Directed by: Bhimrao Mude
- Written by: Shweta Pendse
- Produced by: Rutuja Gaikwad Bajaj, Sachin Bajaj, Rohan Gokhale, Dr. Nishad Chimote
- Starring: Makarand Deshpande; Anjali Patil; Ashok Samarth; Shweta Pendse
- Edited by: Sanil Kokate; Prathamesh Patkar
- Music by: Rohan-Rohan
- Production companies: Ritu Films Cut LLP. Panchajanya Productions
- Release date: 2021
- Country: India
- Language: Marathi

Bardo (transl. A Gap) is a 2021 Indian Marathi-language film directed by Bhimrao Mude and produced by Rutuja Gaikwad Bajaj, Sachin Bajaj with Co-producers Rohan Gohkale & Dr. Nishad Chimote under the banners of Ritu Films Cut LLP and Panchajanya Productions. The screenplay and dialogues of the film were written by actress and Shweta Pendse. Rohan Gokhale was one of the music directors. The film starred Makarand Deshpande, Anjali Patil, Ashok Samarth, .

The film was honored with a National Film Award at the 67th National Film Awards for Best Feature Film in Marathi.

== Cast ==
- Makarand Deshpande as Utpal
- Anjali Patil as Ashalata
- Ashok Samarth as Sakharam
- Girish Pardeshi as Buddhisagar
- Gautam Joglekar
- Dr. Shweta Pendse

== Reception ==
In his review for Asian Movie Pulse, Jithin Mohan writes that "Dedicated to Einstein's Theory of Relativity, “Bardo” tries to tell its story being relatable to all kinds of people which makes it more watchable than it could have been."

== Awards ==
- National Film Award for Best Marathi Feature Film
- National Film Award for Best Female Playback Singer - Savaniee Ravindrra
