= Zollywood =

- Film poster
- Directed by: Trushant Ingle
- Screenplay by: Trushant Ingle
- Produced by: Amit Musurkar; Shashwat Singh; Anshulika Dubey; Priyanka Agarwal
- Starring: Ajit Khobragade; Ashwini Ladekar; Dinkar Gawande; Kajal Rangari; Nisha Dhongade; Asawari Naidu
- Cinematography: Yogesh Rajguru
- Edited by: Vaibhav Dabhade
- Production companies: Wishberry Films; Deux Farming Films
- Distributed by: Sunshine Studios
- Release date: 3 June 2022
- Country: India
- Language: Marathi

Zollywood is an Indian Marathi-language drama film directed by Trushant Ingle in his directorial debut. It was produced by Amit Musurkar and Wishberry Films in association with Deux Faming Films. It was theatrically released on 3 June 2022.

== Cast ==
- Ashwini Ladekar as Poonam
- Asawari Naidu as Miss Rajni
- Dinkar Gawande as Narayanrao Modak
- Anil Uttalwar as Aman
- Kajal Rangari as Raja
- Pappu Katre as Manoj
- Rahul Gawande as Roshan
- Yuvraj Pradhan as Sarnath
- Ajit Khobragde as Dipak Kale

== Release ==
The film was theatrically released on 3 June 2022.

== Critical reception ==
Mihir Bhanage of The Times of India gave the film 3 out of 5 stars and wrote: "An unconventional film about a lesser known theatre form." Abhishek Khule of Maharashtra Times gave the same rating and called it a one-time-watch movie.

== Awards ==
- Special Jury Award at Toulouse Indian Film Festival
- Best Director Debut at Filmfare Marathi Awards

== Soundtrack ==
Track listing
Title	Singer(s)	Lyrics	Length
"Shukrachi Chandni"	Nisha Dongade	Asawari Naidu	3:58
"Dandar"	Prakash Rahangdale, Chagan Pardhi, D.T. Rahangdale, Yograj Ambule, Upraj Ambule, Ganesh Ambule	Manraj Patel	2:57
"Natraj (Aarti)"	Yuvraj Pradhan, Asawari Naidu, Ashwini Ladekar, Ajit Khobragde, Dinkar Gawande, Rahul Gawande	Trushant Ingle	1:28
"Mangal Mangal"	Shshwat Pande	Asawari Naidu	3:39
"Hasara Chehra"	Yuvraj Pradhan	Yuvraj Pradhan	4:38
