= Maharashtra State Film Award for Best Background Score =

Indian film award

- Awarded for: Background Score in a Marathi film
- Sponsored by: Maharashtra State Film Awards
- First award: 2017
- Final award: 2024

The Maharashtra State Film Award for Best Background Score is an award instituted in 2000 and presented annually at the Maharashtra State Film Awards of India to a background score performance in a Marathi cinema film.

== Winners ==
Year	Recipients	Film	Ref.
2017	Nandkumar Ghanekar	Nashibvaan	
2018	Vijay Narayan Gavande	Bandishala	
2019	Prafull-Swapnil	Smile Please	
2020	Vijay Narayan Gavande	Baaplyok	
2021	Sarang Kulkarni	Karkhanisanchi Waari	
2022	Honey Satmakar	Aatur	
2023	Advait Nemlekar	Naal 2	
2024	Santosh Mulekar	Sangeet Manapmaan	

== Multiple wins ==
Individuals with two or more Best Background score awards:

Wins	Recipients
2	Vijay Narayan Gavande
