= Mantr (film) =

- Directed by: (Harshwardhan) Devendra Shinde
- Produced by: Sanjay Katkar
- Starring: Saurabh Gogate; Deepti Devi; Manoj Joshi; Shubhankar Ekbote; Pushkaraj Chirputkar
- Cinematography: Pran Shirodkar
- Distributed by: AP Communications
- Release date: 13 April 2018 (India)
- Country: India
- Language: Marathi

Mantr is a 2018 Indian Marathi film directed by Devendra Shinde. The film stars Saurabh Gogate, Deepti Devi, Manoj Joshi, Shubhankar Ekbote, and Pushkaraj Chirputkar in pivo tal roles. The film was jointly produced by Filmart Productions, North East Films, Shri Productions, and Zenyth Media House.

== Plot ==
A boy from a family of Purohits, a family of Preachers, was not keen to take up the family profession. Still, due to a friend's advice, he accepted the Purohit's family job in Germany. The story revolves around him.

== Cast ==
The cast of the film is as follows:

- Saurabh Gogate as Niranjan
- Deepti Devi as Antara
- Manoj Joshi as Shridhar Pant
- Pushkaraj Chirputkar as Kashinath
- Anuradha Marathe as Niranjan's Aaji
- Shubhangi Damle as Antara's Aaji
- Amruta Joshi as Antara's Sister
- Vishwajit Joshi as Mr. Raste
- Siddheshwar Zadbuke as Ambavane
- Shubhankar Ekbote as Sunny
- Sujay Jadhav as David
- Vrushali Katkar as Niranjan's Aai
- Dhiresh Joshi as Rangnath Kaka
- Sunil Abhyankar as Mrdamle. Nadkarni
- Rajesh Katkar as Antara's Father
- Manjusha Vaidya as Antara's Mother
