= Raj Kapoor Award =

Hindi cinema award in Maharashtra, India

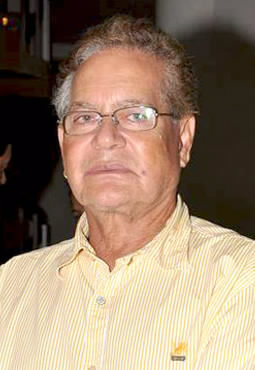
- The 2025 recipient: Salim Khan
- Awarded for: Lifetime achievement
- Location: Maharashtra
- Country: India
- Presented by: Government of Maharashtra
- First award: 1998
- Final award: 2025
- Recent winner: Salim Khan

Highlights
- Total awarded: 27
- First winner: Ramanand Sagar

The Raj Kapoor Award is the highest lifetime achievement award in Hindi cinema, established by the Government of Maharashtra, India. It is presented annually by the Department of Cultural Affairs, Maharashtra. Award instituted in 1998 to recognises individual for their "Lifetime Achievement to Hindi cinema". The recipient is recognized for their exceptional contribution to the Indian cinema and is chosen by a panel of distinguished figures within the Indian film sector. The accolade includes a certificate, a shawl, and a monetary award of ₹5,00,000.

The Government of Maharashtra created the award to commemorate the contribution of Indian actor & filmmaker Raj Kapoor. Kapoor (1924–1988), who is popularly known as greatest and most influential actor and filmmaker of Indian cinema.

The first recipient of the award was filmmaker Ramanand Sagar, who was honoured at the Maharashtra State Film Awards in 1997. As of 2025, there have been 28 awardees.

== Recipients ==
List of award recipients
Year (Ceremony)	Image	Recipient	Work	Notes	Ref.
1997		Ramanand Sagar	Director	Known for his pioneering contribution to Indian cinema & television, Particularly for creating iconic TV series Ramayan.	
1998		Kidar Sharma	Director, screenwriter	Known for his contribution to Hindi cinema as a filmmaker, screenwriter, lyricist & producer, with notable works including Neel Kamal, Chitralekha.	
1999		Bhagwan Dada	Actor, director	A pioneering figure in Hindi cinema, best remembered for his energetic dance style & films such as Albela, Bhabhi & Bhagwan Dada.	
2000		Sandhya Shantaram	Actress	Known for her acclaimed performances in V. Shantaram's films, Particularly Navrang, Jhanak Jhanak Payal Baaje & Do Aankhen Barah Haath.	
2001		Naushad	Music composer	Known for shaping the sound of Hindi films through iconic compositions in Baiju Bawra, Mughal-e-Azam, Mother India & Mere Mehboob.	
2002		Rajesh Khanna	Actor	Remembered as Hindi cinema's first major superstar, with iconic performances in Aradhana, Anand, Kati Patang & Haathi Mera Saathi.	
2003		Pran	Actor	Celebrated for his versatile character portrayals and iconic villainous roles in Hindi cinema.	
2004		Shammi Kapoor	Actor	Renowned as the "Yahoo" star of the Hindi cinema, celebrated his exuberant performances & dance-driven roles in Junglee, Kashmir Ki Kali & Teesri Manzil.	
2005		Rajinikanth	Actor	Celebrated as one of Indian cinema's most influential superstars with landmark performances in South Indian cinema.	
2006		Yash Chopra	Director	Widely regarded for shaping the romantic genre in Hindi cinema through acclaimed films such as Silsila, Chandni, Lamhe & Veer-Zaara.	
2007		Gulzar	Lyricist	Acclaimed for his poetic storytelling & evocative lyrics in Hindi cinema.	
2008		Rekha	Actress	Noted for her versatility & enduring screen presence in films such Umrao Jaan, Silsila, Khoon Bhari Maang & Utsav.	
2009		Manoj Kumar	Actor	Regarded for associated with Patriotic cinema.	
2010		Govind Nihalani	Director	Recognised for India's parallel cinema, acclaimed for hard-hitting films such as Aakrosh, Ardh Satya, Party & Tamas.	
2011		Shyam Benegal	Director, screenwriter	A pioneer of India's parallel cinema, acclaimed for socially grounded films such as Ankur, Nishant, Manthan, Bhumika & Mandi.	
2012		Basu Chatterjee	Director	Credited with giving Hindi cinema a distinct middle-class sensibility through films such as Rajnigandha, Chhoti Si Baat & Khatta Meetha.	
2013		Tanuja	Actress	Admired for her naturalistic performance in Hindi cinema.	
2014		Shashikala	Actress	Noted for her versatile portrayals of supporting & negative characters in Hindi cinema.	
2015		Jeetendra	Actor	Popularly known as "Jumping Jack" of Hindi cinema, with memorable roles in Farz, Himmatwala, Tohfa & Caravan.	
2016		Saira Banu	Actress	Admired for her graceful screen presence & memorable performances in Hindi cinema.	
2017		Dharmendra	Actor	Known for immense contribution to Hindi cinema, earning the beloved title of Bollywood’s “He-Man” through his iconic action roles and enduring screen presence.	
2018		Waman Bhonsle	Editor	Credited with shaping the rhythm and pace of Hindi cinema through acclaimed editing work on Sholay, Don, Mr. India & Kaalia.	
2019		Aruna Irani	Actress	Versatile across comedy, drama & supporting roles, with notable performances in Caravan, Bobby, Beta & Dil To Pagal Hai.	
2020		Mithun Chakraborty	Actor	Celebrated as defining star of 1980s Hindi cinema, acclaimed for his performances in Disco Dancer, Agneepath & Mujhe Insaaf Chahiye.	
2021		Helen	Actress	Known as "Queen of Cabaret", who set the screen with her dazzling dance numbers in Howrah Bridge, Caravan, Don, & Sholay	
2022		Asha Parekh	Actress	Recognised for her contribution to the growth of mainstream female-lead films through Kati Patang, Teesri Manzil, Caravan & Love In Tokyo.	
2023		Anupam Kher	Actor	Known as character actor who brought depth to both dramatic & comic roles in films such as Ram Lakhan, Hum Aapke Hain Kaun, Dilwale Dulhaniya Le Jayenge, & Khosla Ka Ghosla.	
2024		Salim Khan	Screenwriter	Celebrated as the key figure in the evolution of the Hindi action genre, best associated with the screenwriting partnership Salim-Javed & films such as Sholay, Zanjeer, Deewaar, Don & Trishul.	

== See also ==
- V. Shantaram Lifetime Achievement Award
- Dadasaheb Phalke Award
