= Maharashtra State Film Award for Best Art Direction =

Indian film award

- Awarded for: Best art direction in a Marathi film
- Reward: ₹100,000 (US$1,100)
- First award: 1962
- Final award: 2024

Highlights
- Total awarded: 61
- First winner: K. D. Mahajani
- Last winner: Santosh Phutane; Mahesh Kore

The Maharashtra State Film Award for Best Art Direction is an award, begun in 1962, presented annually at the Maharashtra State Film Awards of India to an actor for best performance in a Marathi cinema film. The awardees are decided by a jury constituted every year. They are announced by the Minister for Cultural Affairs and presented by the Chief Minister.

== Winners ==
Year	Recipient(s)	Film	Ref.
1962	K. D. Mahajani	Putra Vhava Aisa	
1963	L. G. Patil	Phakira	
1964	Ram Yedekar	Chhota Jawan	
1965	B. D. Kotwal	Padchhaya	
1966	Sadashiv Gaikwad	Sadhi Mansa	
1967	Baliram Bidkar	Sant Gora Kumbhar	
1968	Dinanath Chavan	Thamb Laxmi Kunku Lavte	
1969	T. K. Desai	Aparadh	
1970	Dada Mahajani	Mumbaicha Jawai	
1971	Baliram Bidkar	Ashich Ek Ratra Hoti	
1972-73	Sadashiv Gaikwad	Ekta Jeev Sadashiv	
1972-73	K. D. Mahajani	Bholi Bhabdi	
1974	Sadashiv Gaikwad	Kartiki	
1975	K. D. Mahajani	Jyotibacha Navas	
1975	Shrikrishna Achrekar	Yashoda	
1976	Pandurang Haval	Choricha Mamla	
1976	C. S. Bhati	Choricha Mamla	
1976	Baburao Jadhav	Ha Khel Sawalyancha	
1976	Sudhir Gaikwad	Ha Khel Sawalyancha	
1977	Dinanath Chavan	Padrachya Savlit	
1977	Sharad Pol	Naav Motha Lakshan Khota	
1978	Dinanath Chavan	Sasurvashin	
1978	K. D. Mahajani	Bhairu Pehlwan Ki Jai	
1979	Sharad Pol	Ashtavinayak	
1979	Pandurang Haval	Irsha	
1980	Pandurang Haval	Sansar	
1980	C. S. Bhati	Zakol	
1981	S. N. Kulkarni	Ghar Jawai	
1981	Ramakant Kavthekar	Nagin	
1982	Sudhir Sase	Malavarcha Ful	
1982	Dinanath Chavan	Laxmichi Paule	
1983	Kishor More	Raghu-Maina	
1983	Baliram Bidkar	Thinagi	
1984	Sharad Pol	Sage Soyare	
1984	Sunil Sawant	Chavhata	
1985	Madhu Patil	Stree Dhan	
1985	Pandurang Haval	Gad Jejuri Jejuri	
1986	Digamber Kulkarni	Pudhcha Paool	
1987	Manohar Achrekar	Prem Karuya Khullam Khulla	
1988	Sharad Pol	Ashi Hi Banwa Banwi	
1989	Purushottam Berde	Hamaal De Dhamaal	
1989	Guruji Bandhu	Hamaal De Dhamaal	
1990	Ramakant Kavthekar	Aaghat	
1991	Ajit Dandekar	Chaukat Raja	
1992	Sharad Pol	Anuradha	
1993	Sharad Pol	Paisa Paisa Paisa	
1994	Sharad Pol	Majha Chakula	
1995	Sumitra Bhave	Doghi	
1996	Satish Bidkar	Putravati	
1997	Satish Bidkar	Navsacha Por	
1998	Ajit Dandekar	Tu Tithe Mee	
1999	Ajit Dandekar	Gharabaher	
2000	Satish Bidkar	Barkha Satarkar	
2001	Sudhir Tarkar	Ek Hoti Vadi	
2002	Sumitra Bhave	Vastupurush	
2003	Nitin Chandrakant Desai	Anahat	
2004	Arun Rahane	Savarkhed Ek Gaon	
2005	Teddy Maurya	Pak Pak Pakaak	
2005	Mahesh Salgaonkar	Pak Pak Pakaak	
2006	Sanjay Ghabde	Maati Maay	
2007	Nitin Chandrakant Desai	Vasudev Balwant Phadke	
2008	Nitin Chandrakant Desai	Harishchandrachi Factory	
2009	Sachin Nevase	Agnidivya	
2010	Eknath Kadam	Mani Mangalsutra	
2011	Nitin Chandrakant Desai	Balgandharva	
2012	Prashant Rane	Kaksparsh	
2012	Abhishek Vijaykar	Kaksparsh	
2013	Santosh Phutane	Maat	
2014	Tejas Modak	Happy Journey	
2014	Prashant Bidkar	Happy Journey	
2014	Ajay Sharma	Happy Journey	
2015	Santosh Phutane	Katyar Kaljat Ghusali	
2015	Mahesh Salgaonkar	Mitwaa	
2016	Baban Adagale	Ekk Albela	
2016	Aman Vidhate	Doctor Rakhmabai	
2017	Vinayak Katkar	Ziprya	
2018	Narendra Haldankar	Bandishala	
2019	Sunil Nigvekar	Anandi Gopal	
2019	Nilesh Wagh	Anandi Gopal	
2020	Ashok Lokare	Me Vasantrao	
2020	A. Rucha	Me Vasantrao	
2021	Bhushan Rahul	Pandu	
2021	Rakesh Kadam	Pandu	
2022	Mahesh Kundalkar	Unaad	
2023	Amey Bhalerao	Shyamchi Aai	
2024	Santosh Phutane	Sangeet Manapmaan	
2024	Mahesh Kore	Swargandharva Sudhir Phadke	

== Multiple wins ==
Individuals with two or more Best Editing awards:

Wins	Actress
7	Sharad Pol
4	Nitin Chandrakant Desai; K. D. Mahajani; Pandurang Haval
3	Sadashiv Gaikwad; Baliram Bidkar; Ajit Dandekar; Dinanath Chavan; Satish Bidkar; Santosh Phutane
2	Sumitra Bhave; Mahesh Salgaonkar; Ramakant Kavthekar; C. S. Bhati
