= Maharashtra State Film Award for Best Comedian =

Indian film award

- Awarded for: Best Comedian
- Sponsored by: Maharashtra State Film Awards
- First award: 1995
- Final award: 2024

Highlights
- First winner: Nandu Madhav

The Maharashtra State Film Award for Best Comedian is an award, presented annually at the Maharashtra State Film Awards of India to an actor for their comic performance in a Marathi cinema film.

== Winner ==
Year	Recipients	Film	Ref.
1995	Nandu Madhav	Bangarwadi	
1996	Dilip Prabhavalkar	Katha Doan Ganpatravanchi	
1997	Vijay Chavan	Kamaal Majhya Baykochi	
1998	Vijay Chavan	Vahinichi Maya	
1999	Ashok Saraf	Sawai Hawaldar	
1999	Nirmiti Sawant	Bindhaast	
2000	Ashok Saraf	Maherchi Pahuni	
2000	Nayana Apte Joshi	Professor Visarbhole	
2001	Not Awarded		
2002	Jaywant Wadkar	Chalu Navra Bholi Bayko	
2002	Kishori Ambiye	Chalu Navra Bholi Bayko	
2003	Surekha Kudachi	Polisachi Bayko	
2004	Sanjay Narvekar	Aga Bai Arrecha!	
2004	Vandana Gupte	Pachhadlela	
2005	Makarand Anaspure	Kaydyacha Bola	
2005	Nirmiti Sawant	Khabardar	
2006	Makarand Anaspure	Bagh Hath Dakhvun	
2007	Siddharth Jadhav	De Dhakka	
2007	Nirmiti Sawant	Hi Porgi Kunachi	
2008	Nikhil Ratnaparkhi	Gho Mala Asla Hava	
2008	Nirmiti Sawant	Valu	
2009	Pushkar Shrotri	Haapus	
2009	Suhas Paranjape	Kon Aahe Re Tikade	
2010	Mohan Joshi	Be Dune Saadechar	
2011	Anand Ingale	Paulwat	
2012	Vijay Patkar	Lavu Ka Lath	
2013	Siddharth Jadhav	Time Please	
2013	Deepali Sayyad	Majhya Navryachi Dusri Bayko	
2014	Dilip Prabhavalkar	Poshter Boyz	
2014	Varsha Usgaonkar	Hututu	
2015	Sumeet Raghavan	Sandook	
2016	Hrishikesh Joshi	Cheater	
2017	Not Awarded		
2018	Not Awarded		
2019	Parth Bhalerao	Basta	
2020	Jitendra Joshi	Choricha Mamla	
2021	Bhau Kadam	Pandu	
2021	Nirmiti Sawant	Jhimma	
2022	Sanjay Narvekar	Timepass 3	
2023	Upendra Limaye	Jaggu Ani Juliet	
2023	Nirmiti Sawant	Jhimma 2	
2024	Ritika Shrotri	Mu. Po. Bombilwaadi	
2024	Ameya Parab	Kurla To Vengurla	

== Multiple wins ==
Individuals with two or more Best Comedian Awards:

Wins	Actor
6	Nirmiti Sawant
2	Ashok Saraf, Makarand Anaspure; Siddharth Jadhav; Dilip Prabhavalkar, Sanjay Narvekar; Vijay Chavan
