= Maharashtra State Film Award for Best Supporting Actor =

Indian film award

- Native name: Chintamanrao Kolhatkar Award for Best Supporting Actor
- Awarded for: Best performance by an actor in a supporting role
- Sponsored by: Ministry of Cultural Affairs (Maharashtra)
- Reward: ₹50,000
- First award: 1962
- Final award: 2024

Highlights
- First winner: Chandrakant Gokhale, Suvasini (1962)

The Maharashtra State Film Award for Best Supporting Actor is an honour presented annually at the Maharashtra State Film Awards to recognize an actor for the best performance in a supporting role in a Marathi film. The award was established in 1962, and its recipients are selected by a jury constituted each year by the Government of Maharashtra. Over the course of 62 award ceremonies, accounting for ties and repeat winners, the award has been presented to 58 different actors. The award was later renamed the Chintamanrao Kolhatkar Award for Best Supporting Actor, in honour of Chintaman Ganesh Kolhatkar, one of the most celebrated actors of Marathi cinema and theatre. Recipients receive a statuette and a cash prize.

== Achievement records ==
=== Multiple wins ===
Individuals with two or more Best Supporting Actor awards:

Wins	Actor
5	Ashok Saraf
2	Chandrakant Gokhale; Sharad Talwalkar; Nilu Phule; Govind Kulkarni; Mohan Gokhale; Prashant Subhedar; Avinash Narkar; Vijay Chavan; Kuldeep Pawar; Suhas Palshikar; Arun Nalawade Kishor Kadam; Sandeep Pathak

- Ashok Saraf is the most celebrated winner in this category with five awards. He is also the only actor to have won across three different decades; the 1970s, 1980s (three times), and 1990s.
- Ashok Saraf, Mohan Gokhale, and Sandeep Pathak are the only actors to win the award in consecutive years: Ashok Saraf in 1981–1982, Mohan Gokhale in 1983–1984, and Sandeep Pathak in 2014–2015.
- Two father-son duos have received this honour: Nana Palshikar and Suhas Palshikar, as well as Chandrakant Gokhale and Vikram Gokhale.
- The award has been shared on 13 occasions. The first tie occurred in 1995, while the most recent was in 2011.

== Winners and nominees ==
List of award recipients, showing the year, role(s) and film(s)
Year	Photos of winners	Recipient(s)	Role(s)	Work(s)	Refs.
1962		Chandrakant Gokhale	Martand Sane	Suvasini	
1963		Nana Palshikar	Phakira's Father	Phakira	
1964		Gajanan Jagirdar	Jawan's Grandfather	Chhota Jawan	
1965		Ganpat Patil	Nachya	Waghya Murli	
1966		Chittaranjan Kolhatkar	Father	Hirwa Chuda	
1967		Chandrakant Mandare	Doctor	Santh Wahate Krishnamai	
1968		Sharad Talwalkar	Sulochana's Father	Ektee	
1969		Ramesh Deo	Shyam Date	Aparadh	
1970		Sharad Talwalkar	Appa Ponkshe	Mumbaicha Jawai	
1971		Nilu Phule	Nilkanth	Ajab Tujhe Sarkar	
1972	Not Awarded				
1973	Not Awarded				
1974		Mohan Kothiwan		Kartiki	
1975		Ashok Saraf	Havaldar Sakharam	Pandu Havaldar	
1976		Govind Kulkarni		Pahuni	
1977		Shreeram Lagoo		Naav Motha Lakshan Khota	
1978		Nilu Phule	Balasaheb	Sasurvashin	
1979		Chandrakant Gokhale	Baba	Irsha	
1980		Govind Kulkarni	Baba	Paij	
1981		Ashok Saraf	Madan Kumar	Gondhalat Gondhal	
1982		Ashok Saraf	Khandoji Farzand	Ek Daav Bhutacha	
1983		Mohan Gokhale	Budha	Sansar Pakhrancha	
1984		Mohan Gokhale	Gopya	Thakas Mahathak	
1985		Ajinkya Deo	Shekhar	Ardhangi	
1986		Yashwant Dutt	Annasaheb	Pudhcha Paool	
1987		Baldev Ingale		Sarja	
1988		Ashok Saraf	Dinkar Luktuke / Bajirao Rangade	Maza Pati Karodpati	
1989		Avinash Kharshikar	Shyam	De Taali	
1990		Prashant Subhedar		Kuldeepak	
1991		Ashok Saraf	Gopinath (Gopu Kaka) Sawant / Gopinath Kirtikar (fake) (Note: Ashok played a single character which had multiple different names.)	Aayatya Gharat Gharoba	
1992		Uday Mhaiskar		Patit Pavan	
1993		Prashant Damle	Dr. Dinesh Kirtikar	Savat Mazi Ladki	
1994		Vikram Gokhale	Gopal (Nanasaheb) Abhyankar	Maza Saubhagya	
1995		Avinash Narkar	Milind Wagh	Mukta	
1995		Suhas Bhalekar		Nilambari	
1996		Vijay Chavan		Ashi Asavi Sasu	
1996		Prashant Subhedar		Raosaheb	
1997		Dilip Prabhavalkar	Minister	Sarkarnama	
1997		Sanjay Narvekar		Navsacha Por	
1998		Kuldeep Pawar		Aali Laxmi Sasarla	
1998		Avinash Narkar		Hasari	
1999		Suhas Palshikar		Gabhara	
2000		Kuldeep Pawar		Sattadhish	
2000		Daji Bhatawadekar		Tochi Ek Samarth	
2001		Sudhir Joshi	Paranjape Aajoba	Devki	
2001		Vikram Gaikwad		Sangharsh Jeevanacha	
2002		Atul Kulkarni	Prabhakar	Bhet	
2002		Arun Nalawade	Anna Smith	Resham Gath	
2003		Sandeep Kulkarni	Dr. Milind Sane	Shwaas	
2003		Milind Shinde	Advocate S. M. Garud	Not Only Mrs. Raut	
2004		Viju Khote	Babu Borkar	Uttarayan	
2005		Mohan Joshi	Mani's Father	Sarivar Sari	
2005		Sandesh Jadhav	Insp. Subhash Anaspure	Dombivli Fast	
2006		Atul Parchure	Bunty Kaka	Mission Champion	
2006		Suhas Palshikar		Supari	
2007		Swapnil Joshi	Mohan Bhave	Checkmate	
2008		Jitendra Joshi	Dr. Bhagwan Satpute	Gulmohar	
2008		Vijay Chavan		Ti	
2009		Kishor Kadam	Pandoba	Natarang	
2009		Kiran Karmarkar	Chief Minister	Kshanokshani	
2010		Prasad Oak	Prakash Chandankar	Tee Ratra	
2011		Vidyadhar Joshi	Ratan Shah	Arjun	
2011		Anand Ingale	Mr. Nene	Paulwat	
2012		Arun Nalawade	Nikhil's Father	Shoor Amhi Sardar	
2013		Kishor Kadam	Kachru Mane (Nana)	Fandry	
2014		Sandeep Pathak	Sudama	Ek Hazarachi Note	
2015		Sandeep Pathak	Popat	Rangaa Patangaa	
2016		Manoj Joshi	Keshav Bhatji	Dashakriya	
2017		Shubhankar Ekbote	Sunny	Mantr	
2018		Swanand Kirkire	Prasanna	Chumbak	
2019		Rohit Phalke	Madhav	Panghrun	
2019		Suhas Palshikar	Namdev Pawar	Basta	
2019		Sanjay Khapre	Bhima Konde	Tajmal	
2020		Vitthal Kale	Sagar	Baaplyok	
2020		Nitin Bhajan	Vasant	Sumi	
2020		Pushkaraj Chirputkar	Purushottam Laxman Deshpande	Me Vasantrao	
2021		Amey Wagh	Siddharth	Frame	
2021		Priyadarshan Jadhav	Tanaji	Shaktiman	
2021		Mohan Agashe	Satish	Karkhanisanchi Waari	
2022		Yogesh Soman	Avinash Deshmukh	Ananya	
2022		Kishor Kadam	Sirtawar	Territory	
2022		Subodh Bhave	Chhatrapati Shivaji Maharaj	Har Har Mahadev	
2023		Santosh Juvekar	Jalindar	Ravrambha	
2023		Pravin Dalimbkar	Gura	Ghar Banduk Biryani	
2023		Subodh Bhave	Parag	Alibaba Ani Chalishitale Chor	
2024		Taranath Khiratkar	Daulatrao Wandhare	Sthal	
2024		Dhananjay Mandaokar	Falgun	Ghaath	
2024		Janardhan Kadam	Perku	Ghaath	
