= Maharashtra State Film Award for Best Debut Director =

Indian film award

- Awarded for: Debut Director in a Marathi film
- Sponsored by: Maharashtra State Film Awards
- First award: 2009
- Final award: 2024

Highlights
- First winner: Sudesh Manjrekar
- Latest winner: Anil Amrut Bhalerao

The Maharashtra State Film Award for Best Debut Director is an award, presented annually at the Maharashtra State Film Awards of India to a director for their debut performance in a Marathi cinema film.

== Winners ==
Year	Actress	Film	Ref.
2009	Santosh Manjrekar	Mi Shivajiraje Bhosale Boltoy!	
2010	Vikram Gokhale	Aaghaat	
2011	Ajit Bhairavkar	Gajaar: Journey of the Soul	
2012	Nikhil Mahajan	Pune 52	
2013	Nagraj Manjule	Fandry	
2014	Sameer Patil	Poshter Boyz	
2015	Makarand Mane	Ringan	
2016	Sandeep Patil	Dashakriya	
2017	Vikram Phadnis	Hrudayantar	
2018	Sachin Jadhav	Tendlya	
2018	Nachiket Waikar	Tendlya	
2019	Achyut Narayan	Vegli Vaat	
2020	Vaibhav Khisti	June	
2020	Suhrud Godbole	June	
2021	Rasika Agashe	Ticha Shahar Hona	
2022	Pratap Phad	Ananya	
2023	Ashish Bende	Aatmapamphlet	
2024	Anil Amrut Bhalerao	Chabila	
