= Mrunmayee Deshpande =

Indian actress and director (born 1988)

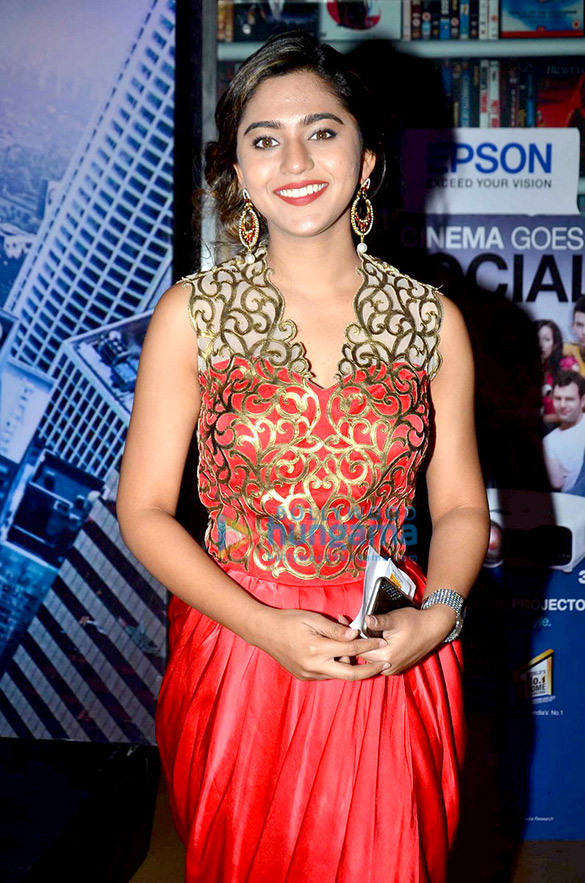
- Deshpande in 2016
- Born: 29 May 1988 (age 38); Pune, Maharashtra, India
- Occupations: Actress; director; writer
- Years active: 2008–present
- Spouse: Swapnil Rao (m. 2016)
- Relatives: Gautami Deshpande (sister)

Mrunmayee Deshpande (pronounced [ˈmɾuɳməjiː d̪eʃpaːɳɖe]; born 29 May 1988) is an Indian actress, director and television host who predominantly works in Marathi cinema and television, with occasional roles in Hindi films. Over a career spanning nearly two decades, she has received several accolades, including four Maharashtra State Film Awards and seven Zee Marathi Awards. She made her television debut with the suspense drama serial Agnihotra (2007) and rose to prominence playing the lead role of Janaki in the long-running Zee Marathi drama Kunku (2009–2012).

Deshpande began her film career with Lek Majhi Gunachi (2010), for which she won the Maharashtra State Film Award for Best Debut Actress. She subsequently appeared in Mokala Shwaas (2012), Pune Via Bihar (2014), Katyar Kaljat Ghusali (2015) and Natsamrat (2016), the latter earning her a nomination for the Filmfare Award Marathi. She later co-wrote the relationship drama Anuraag (2016) and took on roles in the historical drama Farzand (2018) and the period film Fatteshikast (2019). Her other notable release that year was the romantic drama Miss U Mister, for which she won the Maharashtra State Film Award for Best Actress. Her subsequent film credits include Sher Shivraj (2022), the musical drama Chandramukhi (2022) and the biographical film Swargandharva Sudhir Phadke (2024) as well as the Amazon Prime Video series Mumbai Diaries 26/11.

Beyond acting, Deshpande made her directorial debut with Mann Fakiraa (2020), which she also wrote, followed by Tu Bol Na (2025), and has hosted several Marathi television shows, including Sa Re Ga Ma Pa Marathi L'il Champs.

== Early life ==
Deshpande was born on 29 May 1988 into a Marathi family to Vivek Deshpande and Pratibha Deshpande. She has a younger sister, Gautami Deshpande, who is also an actress and singer. She studied at Renuka Swaroop High School and later graduated from Sir Parashurambhau College, both in Pune, in 2007.

During her school and college years, she developed an interest in dance and theatre. During college, she won competitions such as the Purushottam and Firodia Karandak as a director. Deshpande began training in Kathak around the sixth grade under dancer Archana Patwardhan and, after completing her secondary-school examinations, continued her training under Manisha Sathe, where she pursued an advanced-level diploma in the form. She has credited her Kathak training with shaping her approach to performance, particularly the emphasis on expressing emotion through facial expressions, a skill she later applied to her acting, including her early television role in Kunku.

== Career ==
=== 2007–2011: Debut and early work ===
Deshpande made her acting debut in 2007 with a supporting role in the Hindi-language crime drama It's Breaking News, directed by Vishal Inamdar. The following year, she began her television career with the Star Pravah daily soap Agnihotra, an ensemble drama centred on the Agnihotri family, who uncover their forgotten history, mysterious secrets and inherited traditions. In 2008, she made her Hindi film debut in a leading role with Humne Jeena Seekh Liya, opposite Siddharth Chandekar. The film featured several Marathi actors and was based on the Marathi novel Shaala, which explores the experiences of four school friends and the challenges they face. It was a commercial failure.

In 2009, Deshpande appeared in two Marathi films alongside Kishor Kadam. In Sumitra Bhave–Sunil Sukthankar's Ek Cup Chya, she portrayed the daughter of a bus conductor who uses the Right to Information Act to fight an unjust electricity bill. The film was screened at several international film festivals, including the Miami Film Festival and the London Film Festival, where it received critical appreciation. She also received the Maharashtra State Film Award for Best Debut Actress for her performance in Lek Majhi Gunachi, in which she portrayed a courageous young woman who overcomes adversity; although the film was produced earlier, it was released in 2013.

The same year, she was cast as Janaki opposite Sunil Barve, who was around twenty years her senior, in the Zee Marathi television series Kunku. She portrayed a young village girl who is unexpectedly brought into the influential Killedar household and married to politician Narsingh as part of an attempt to avert a prophecy of his death. The role brought her widespread recognition and established her as a household name. Kunku became one of Zee Marathi's highest-rated programmes, and her performance earned her several Zee Marathi Awards, including Best Actress and Popular Face of the Year. In 2011, Deshpande won the dance reality show Eka Peksha Ek.

=== 2012–2017: Rise to prominence ===
Following the success of Kunku, Deshpande expanded her film career, starring in 2012 in Kanchan Adhikari's family drama Mokala Shwas alongside Sharad Ponkshe, Neha Gadre and Pratiksha Lonkar, which explores the struggles of a family whose patriarch is dissatisfied with having three daughters. She portrayed Kusum, the eldest daughter, who attempts to maintain peace within the family while dealing with her father's discriminatory attitude towards his daughters. Her performance earned her the Best Supporting Actress award at the 50th Maharashtra State Film Awards. She subsequently appeared in the ensemble comedy Sanshay Kallol, opposite Pushkar Shrotri. A Prahaar critic noted her serious portrayal, adding that "she has made these situations golden."

In 2014, Deshpande's first release was Pune Via Bihar, alongside Umesh Kamat and Bharat Jadhav, in which she portrayed a Bihari woman who falls in love with a man from Pune. A Maharashtra Times review praised her performance in several scenes, although it noted that her Hindi occasionally sounded more Marathi than Bihari. The same year, she appeared in the comedy Aandhali Koshimbir, the adventurous thriller Mamachya Gavala Jaaoo Yaa, and Shrabani Deodhar's comedy Sata Lota Pan Sagla Khota, which received an average response.

Deshpande appeared in the anthology film Bioscope in 2015, in the segment Mitraa, directed by Ravi Jadhav. The segment was based on Sandeep Khare's poem Atasha Nakoshe Vatate and adapted from Vijay Tendulkar's acclaimed short story Mitra. Exploring the theme of homosexuality, Mitraa received critical acclaim and won the National Film Award for Best Short Fiction Film as well as an award at the KASHISH Pride Film Festival. That same year, she achieved her first major commercial success with the musical drama Katyar Kaljat Ghusali, directed by Subodh Bhave and based on the acclaimed play of the same name. Deshpande portrayed Uma, the daughter of classical singer Bhanu Shankar Shastri, who helps Sadashiv learn her father's musical tradition, alongside Bhave and Shankar Mahadevan. Both the film and her performance were well received by critics and audiences. Katyar Kaljat Ghusali grossed approximately ₹40 crore (equivalent to ₹60 crore or US$6.3 million in 2023), becoming the highest-grossing Marathi film of 2015 and one of the highest-grossing Marathi films of all time. Her performance also earned her several nominations for Best Supporting Actress.

She next appeared in Mahesh Manjrekar's drama Natsamrat, based on the acclaimed play of the same name by playwright Kusumagraj. Starring alongside Nana Patekar, Medha Manjrekar, Sunil Barve and Neha Pendse, she portrayed Vidya, the daughter of a celebrated theatre actor whose struggles with his behaviour strain their relationship. The film received widespread acclaim and earned approximately ₹50 crore (equivalent to ₹72 crore or US$7.5 million in 2023), making it the second highest grossing Marathi film of its time. Mihir Bhanage of The Times of India praised Deshpande's performance, writing that she "shows that she’s got so much untapped potential," and she also received nominations at the Filmfare Awards Marathi and Zee Chitra Gaurav Awards. She later earned a Maharashtra State Film Award for Best Actress nomination for her performance in Anuraag, a relationship drama she co-wrote about a married couple revisiting their past to rediscover their relationship. She played a supporting role in Chandrakant Kulkarni's Dhyanimani (2017), which received moderate success. Ganesh Matkari of Pune Mirror described her performance as "memorable", although he noted that her character disappears in the second half of the film.

=== 2018–2020: Established actress and directorial debut ===
In 2018, Deshpande portrayed Kesar, an informer who secretly helps the Maratha soldiers capture Panhala Fort, in the historical drama Farzand. The film, the first instalment of Digpal Lanjekar's Shri Shivraj Ashtak film series, was a commercial success, grossing approximately ₹10 crore (equivalent to ₹13 crore or US$1.4 million in 2023). She next starred opposite Suhas Joshi in Bogda, a film that explores the complex and deeply emotional bond between a mother and daughter. The film received critical acclaim and was screened at several film festivals. Deshpande also appeared in Viju Mane's Shikari, playing a small-town aspiring actress who dreams of making it big in the showbiz industry. The film received negative reviews for its storyline and adult-oriented comedy.

She had four releases in 2019. She reunited with Mahesh Manjrekar for the biographical drama Bhai: Vyakti Ki Valli, based on the life of Purushottam Laxman Deshpande, in which she appeared briefly as his first wife, who dies a week after their marriage. She subsequently featured in 15 August, produced by Madhuri Dixit and released directly on Netflix, alongside Rahul Pethe and Adinath Kothare. The film received a mixed response. Her other release that year was the romantic drama Miss U Mister, opposite Siddharth Chandekar, which explores the challenges faced by a couple in a long-distance marriage. Preeti Atulkar of The Times of India praised Deshpande for displaying "a gamut of emotions with utmost ease"; her performance earned her the Maharashtra State Film Award for Best Actress and a nomination for Best Actress at the 5th Filmfare Awards Marathi.

In 2020, she made her directorial debut with the romantic comedy Mann Fakiraa, which she also wrote. The film follows a newly married couple who discover that they remain in love with their respective former partners. Her direction and the film's unconventional premise received praise, with Soumitra Pote of ABP Majha calling her choice of a complex subject for a debut "a bold move" and noting that she had "pulled it off". Despite its promotion, the film failed to make a significant impact at the box office.

=== 2021–present: Streaming and supporting roles ===
The following year, she appeared in supporting roles in the Hindi action thriller The Power and the acclaimed Marathi drama Karkhanisanchi Waari. She also made her web-series debut in both Hindi and Marathi with Planet Marathi OTT's Soppa Nasta Kahi, alongside Abhijeet Khandkekar and Shashank Ketkar. Wider recognition followed with her role as Dr. Sujata Ajawale in the medical thriller series Mumbai Diaries, alongside Mohit Raina and Konkona Sen Sharma. Her character, a young doctor confronting caste discrimination and professional adversity while advocating for her patients, appeared in both seasons released on Amazon Prime Video. The performance was particularly praised in the second season, with Mayur Sanap of Rediff describing her as "emotionally volatile" and noting that she made a lasting impact in one of the season's best-written roles.

Deshpande went on to portrayed Dolly, the wife of Daulatrao (Adinath Kothare), in Prasad Oak's romantic political drama Chandramukhi (2022). The film centres on Daulatrao's relationship with Tamasha dancer Chandramukhi, played by Amruta Khanvilkar. It received critical and commercial success, earning about ₹24 crore (equivalent to ₹25 crore or US$2.6 million in 2023) and becoming the fifth highest-grossing Marathi film of 2022. Deshpande's performance was well received, with Shubham Kulkarni of Koimoi describing the role as one she could "cakewalk", while Sameer Ahire of Movie Talkies stated "how effortlessly she does it and how convincing she is in every scene." She won several accolades for the role, including her second Maharashtra State Film Award for Best Supporting Actress.

Alongside these projects, Deshpande continued her association with the Shri Shivraj Ashtak series, reprising Kesar in Sher Shivraj (2022) and Subhedar (2023), following her appearance in Fatteshikast (2019). All three films were critical and commercial successes. In 2023, she portrayed Lata Mangeshkar in Kedar Shinde's musical biographical film Maharashtra Shahir, which received a moderate response. She subsequently played the wife of Sudhir Phadke in the musical biographical film Swargandharva Sudhir Phadke, which had an average theatrical run. She starred in, directed, and wrote the romantic drama Tu Bol Na in 2015, which was initially released under the title Mana Che Shlok. However, the title was later changed following severe backlash and protests, which also affected the film's box-office collection. Santosh Bhingarde of Sakal praised the film, stating, "She has beautifully depicted the complexities of the mind, emotions and morals of the current generation."

== Personal life ==
Deshpande married Swapnil Rao, a businessman, in December 2016 in a traditional Maharashtrian ceremony.

== Filmography ==
Key
†	Denotes films that have not yet been released

Year	Title	Actor	Director	Writer	Role	Notes	Ref.
2007	It's Breaking News	Yes	No	No	Dandekar's daughter	Hindi film	
2008	Humne Jeena Seekh Liya	Yes	No	No	Pari	Hindi film	
2009	Lek Majhi Gunachi	Yes	No	No	Gauri		
2009	Ek Cup Chya	Yes	No	No	Vasanti Sawant		
2012	Mokala Shwas	Yes	No	No	Kusum Jagtap		
2013	Sanshay Kallol	Yes	No	No	Shravani		
2013	Dham Dhoom	Yes	No	No	Madhura (Madhu)		
2013	Navra Majha Bhavra	Yes	No	No	Herself	Guest appearance	
2014	Pune Via Bihar	Yes	No	No	Tara Yadav		
2014	Aandhali Koshimbir	Yes	No	No	Radhika		
2014	Sata Lota Pan Sagla Khota	Yes	No	No	Vasanti		
2014	Mamachya Gavala Jaaoo Yaa	Yes	No	No	Teju		
2015	Bioscope	Yes	No	No	Mitra	In segment "Mitraa"	
2015	Slam Book	Yes	No	No	Aparna		
2015	Katyar Kaljat Ghusali	Yes	No	No	Uma		
2016	Natsamrat	Yes	No	No	Vidya Ganpat Belwalkar		
2016	Anuraag	Yes	No	Yes	Soumya	Also presenter	
2016	Gulmohor	Yes	No	No	Sai		
2017	Dhyanimani	Yes	No	No	Aparna Karandikar		
2018	Farzand	Yes	No	No	Kesar		
2018	Bogda	Yes	No	No	Tejaswini (Teju)		
2018	Shikari	Yes	No	No	Phulwa Gulaabrao Phoolsundar		
2019	Bhai: Vyakti Ki Valli	Yes	No	No	Sundar Divadkar		
2019	15 August	Yes	No	No	Jui		
2019	Miss U Mister	Yes	No	No	Kaveri		
2019	Fatteshikast	Yes	No	No	Kesar		
2020	Mann Fakiraa	No	Yes	Yes	—N/a		
2021	The Power	Yes	No	No	Ratna Thakur	Hindi film	
2021	Karkhanisanchi Waari	Yes	No	No	Madhuri Kalbhor		
2022	Sher Shivraj	Yes	No	No	Kesar		
2022	Chandramukhi	Yes	No	No	Damayanti (Dolly) Deshmane		
2022	Bebhaan	Yes	No	No	Radha		
2023	Maharashtra Shahir	Yes	No	No	Lata Mangeshkar		
2023	Subhedar	Yes	No	No	Kesar		
2024	Swargandharva Sudhir Phadke	Yes	No	No	Lalita Phadke		
2025	Ek Radha Ek Meera	Yes	No	No	Manasvi	Delayed	
2025	Tu Bol Na	Yes	Yes	Yes	Manava		

=== Television ===
Year	Show	Role	Channel	Ref.
2008	Agnihotra	Sai Dinesh Nimbalkar	Star Pravah	
2009–2012	Kunku	Janki Pawar / Killedar	Zee Marathi	
2011	Eka Peksha Ek	Contestant	Zee Marathi	
2014–2017	Comedychi Bullet Train	Anchor	Colors Marathi	
2018	Zee Maharashtra Kushti Dangal	Anchor	Zee Talkies	
2019	Yuva Singer Ek Number	Anchor	Zee Yuva	
2021	Sa Re Ga Ma Pa Marathi Li'l Champs	Anchor	Zee Marathi	
2022	Band Baja Varat	Host	Zee Marathi	
2023	Sa Re Ga Ma Pa Marathi Li'l Champs	Anchor	Zee Marathi	
2026	Sa Re Ga Ma Pa Marathi	Anchor	Zee Marathi	

=== Theatre ===
- A Fair Deal (2015)
- Labhale Amhaas Bhagya (2015)

=== Web series ===
Year	Series	Role	Ref.
2021	Soppa Nasta Kahi	Anuja	
2021–2023	Mumbai Diaries	Dr. Sujata Ajawale	

== Accolades ==
Award	Year	Category	Work	Result	Ref.
Fakt Marathi Cine Sanman	2022	Best Actress in a Supporting Role	Chandramukhi	Won	
Filmfare Awards Marathi	2017	Best Supporting Actress	Natsamrat	Nominated	
Filmfare Awards Marathi	2021	Best Actress	Miss U Mister	Nominated	
Maharashtra State Film Awards	2009	Best Debut Actress	Lek Majhi Gunachi	Won	
Maharashtra State Film Awards	2012	Best Supporting Actress	Mokala Shwas	Won	
Maharashtra State Film Awards	2015	Best Actress	Anuraag	Nominated	
Maharashtra State Film Awards	2019	Best Actress	Miss U Mister	Won	
Maharashtra State Film Awards	2021	Best Actress	Bebhaan	Nominated	
Maharashtra State Film Awards	2022	Best Supporting Actress	Chandramukhi	Won	
Maharashtracha Favourite Kon?	2013	Favourite Actress	Mokala Shwaas	Nominated	
Maharashtracha Favourite Kon?	2016	Favourite Actress	Katyar Kaljat Ghusali	Nominated	
Maharashtracha Favourite Kon?	2016	Favourite Supporting Actress	Natsamrat	Nominated	
Maharashtracha Favourite Kon?	2018	Favourite Actress	Farzand	Nominated	
Maharashtracha Favourite Kon?	2018	Popular Face of the Year	—N/a	Nominated	
Maharashtracha Favourite Kon?	2019	Favourite Actress	Fatteshikast	Nominated	
Maharashtracha Favourite Kon?	2023	Favourite Supporting Actress	Chandramukhi	Nominated	
MaTa Sanman	2023	Best Supporting Actress	Chandramukhi	Nominated	
Planet Marathi Film & OTT Awards	2023	Best Supporting Actor (Female)	Chandramukhi	Nominated	
Pravah Picture Awards	2023	Best Supporting Actress	Chandramukhi	Nominated	
Sakal Premier Awards	2023	Best Supporting Actress	Chandramukhi	Nominated	
Sanskruti Kaladarpan	2016	Best Supporting Actress	Katyar Kaljat Ghusali	Nominated	
SPOTT Awards	2022	Performance in a Supporting Role - Female	Mumbai Diaries	Nominated	
Zee Chitra Gaurav Puraskar	2016	Best Supporting Actress	Natsamrat	Won	
Zee Marathi Utsav Natyancha Awards	2010	Best Actress	Kunku	Won	
Zee Marathi Utsav Natyancha Awards	2010	Best Character – Female	Kunku	Nominated	
Zee Marathi Utsav Natyancha Awards	2010	Best Sibling	Kunku	Won	
Zee Marathi Utsav Natyancha Awards	2010	Popular Face of the Year	Kunku	Won	
Zee Marathi Utsav Natyancha Awards	2011	Best Actress	Kunku	Nominated	
Zee Marathi Utsav Natyancha Awards	2011	Best Character – Female	Kunku	Won	
Zee Marathi Utsav Natyancha Awards	2011	Best Sibling	Kunku	Won	
Zee Marathi Utsav Natyancha Awards	2011	Popular Face of the Year	Kunku	Nominated	
Zee Marathi Utsav Natyancha Awards	2021	Best Anchor	Sa Re Ga Ma Pa Marathi Li'l Champs	Won	
Zee Marathi Utsav Natyancha Awards	2023	Best Anchor	Sa Re Ga Ma Pa Marathi Li'l Champs	Won	
