= Sanshay Kallol =

- Promotional poster
- Directed by: Vishal Inamdar
- Starring: Ankush Chaudhari; Pushkar Shotri; Gauri Nigudkar; Mrunmayee Deshpande
- Cinematography: Suresh Deshmane
- Music by: Kaushal Inamdar
- Release date: 5 April 2013
- Country: India
- Language: Marathi

Sanshay Kallol is a 2013 Indian Marathi-language film directed by Vishal Inamdar. The film stars Ankush Chaudhari, Pushkar Shotri, Gauri Nigudkar, Mrunmayee Deshpande and Kshitee Jog It was theatrically released on 5 April 2013.

== Cast ==
- Ankush Chaudhari as Jaisinha
- Pushkar Shotri as Dhananjay
- Gauri Nigudkar as Asha
- Pooja Sawant as Karthiki
- Mrunmayee Deshpande as Sharavani
- Kshitee Jog as Chaitra
- Reema Lagoo as Dhananjay's mother
- Sulekha Talvalkar as Asha's boutique Vishakha
- Sanjay Khapre as Bhujangrao an informer cum Auto Rickshawala
- Omkar Govardhan as Asha's brother Mithun
- Siddharth Chandekar as Siddharth
- Abhijit Satam as Vrushabh

== Reception ==
Saumitra Pote from Maharashtra Times opined, "In fact, the movie begins with mutual suspicion. So one might even feel this is an overdose of skepticism. But there is no problem watching the movie without much stress". A critic of Loksatta wrote "Newlyweds think ten times before watching this movie! If you want to learn the lesson of 'Do not be suspicious' by watching the movie, then fine! Otherwise your world will not work". jaykrishna from Prahaar stated "This is the doubt that creates doubt in the minds of the audience themselves that why should he have done such a hasty despite having a strong team. If you want to see the performance of your favorite actors and want to laugh out loud, then there is no problem watching it once".
