= Prem Mhanje Prem Mhanje Prem Asta =

- Directed by: Mrinal Dev-Kulkarni
- Screenplay by: Manisha Korde
- Story by: Mrinal Dev-Kulkarni
- Produced by: Sachin Parekar
- Starring: Mrinal Dev-Kulkarni; Sachin Khedekar; Pallavi Joshi; Sunil Barve; Suhas Joshi; Mohan Agashe; Ritika Shrotri
- Cinematography: Amalendu Chaudhary
- Music by: Milind Ingle; Surel Ingle
- Distributed by: Everest Entertainment Pvt. Ltd.
- Release date: 19 April 2013
- Country: India
- Language: Marathi

Prem Mhanje Prem Mhanje Prem Asta (Marathi: प्रेम म्हणजे प्रेम म्हणजे प्रेम असतं) (Translation: Love is love is love) is a Marathi drama film released on 19 April 2013. Produced by Sachin Parekar and directed by Mrinal Dev-Kulkarni. The film is Mrinal Dev-Kulkarni's directorial debut. The film stars are Mrinal Dev-Kulkarni, Sachin Khedekar, Pallavi Joshi, Sunil Barve, Suhas Joshi, Mohan Agashe and Smita Talwalkar. The film's music is by Milind Ingle and Surel Ingle.

The film is based on the connection between love and marriage.

== Plot ==
The movie is a heart-warming story of two different individuals who at one point in their lives were married. A single mother along with her two daughters live with her mother-in-law. Her husband had abandoned them 4 years ago, but staying in the same city had never bothered to check on his family. The only thing he did in those 4 years was to send divorce papers, which his wife has not signed.

Other side of the story revolves around a doctor who is a father to two kids. His ex-wife had to choose between staying home with family or career in USA and she chose career. But she never let the divorce hamper the relation she shares with her ex-husband. But this incident had definitely made her ex-husband depressed and alone.

One eventful day at their kids' school gets them together and a conversation begins, which blooms into something amazing. Until there is a twist in the tale.

== Awards ==
The film was awarded the Best Mainline Film Award for Gender Sensitivity at the fifth National Laadli Media and Advertising Awards held at Tata Theatre, NCPA, Mumbai in January 2017.

== Cast ==
- Mrinal Dev-Kulkarni
- Sachin Khedekar
- Pallavi Joshi
- Sunil Barve
- Suhas Joshi
- Mohan Agashe
- Smita Talwalkar
- Siddharth Chandekar
- Ritika Shrotri

== Crew ==
- Director - Mrinal Dev-Kulkarni
- Story - Mrinal Dev-Kulkarni
- Producer - Sachin Parekar
- Cinematographer - Amlendu Chaudhary
- Art Director - Vinod Gunaji and Nitin Borkar
- Music Director - Milind Ingle and Surel Ingle
- Lyricist - Kishore Kadam

== Soundtrack ==
The music has been directed by Milind Ingle and Surel Ingle, while the lyrics have been provided by Kishore Kadam.

=== Track listing ===
No.	Title	Length
1.	"Prem Mhanaje Prem"	5:14
2.	"Man Bavarate"	4:32
3.	"Ya Rastyavar"	5:24
