= Coffee (2022 film) =

- Film Poster
- Directed by: Nitin Kamble
- Written by: Machindra Bugade
- Screenplay by: Nitin Kamble
- Produced by: Kailash Sorari; Vimla Sorari
- Starring: Siddharth Chandekar; Spruha Joshi; Kashyap Parulekar
- Cinematography: I.Giridharan
- Edited by: Rahul Bhatankar
- Music by: Trupti Chavan
- Production company: Tanvi Films
- Distributed by: Sunshine Studio
- Release date: 14 January 2022
- Running time: 124 minutes
- Country: India
- Language: Marathi

Coffee is a 2022 Indian Marathi-language film directed by Nitin Kamble and produced by Tanvi Films. Story and screenplay is by Machindra Bugade. It stars Siddharth Chandekar, Spruha Joshi and Kashyap Parulekar in lead roles. It was theatrically released on 14 January 2022.

== Plot ==
A happily married woman develops feelings for a charming young man on a business trip. As she does not hide anything from her husband, things get complicated when she explains how she feels to her husband.

== Cast ==
- Siddharth Chandekar as Rohit
- Spruha Joshi as Renuka
- Kashyap Parulekar as Ranjeet
- Mohan Joshi
- Kailash Sorari as Rohit's friend
- Madhura Vaidya as Sneha

== Reception ==
=== Critical reception ===
Coffee received mixed reviews from critics. The Preeti Atulkar of The Times of India rated 2.5 and reviewed as The acting of all the three central characters is good enough. Spruha, however, is in the lead. Siddharth looks handsome, and performs very calmly. But the scenes between Spruha and Kashyap, where they engage in long conversations, are quite interesting. Despite Spruha and Siddharth being seen together more often in the film, the chemistry between the former and Kashyap is pretty good. With a monotonous beginning but an effective climax, this film is worth a one-time watch. Suyog Zore of Cinestaan is rate 2 out of five and written about film "Coffee is a film that squanders an opportunity to deal with complex relationship issues in a realistic manner and would have worked if the writer had given equal importance to all the three characters". Kalpeshraj Kubal of Maharashtra Times rate 2.5 The film is not very flashy. Limitations in production value are felt. The technical side is also fine; But for Spruha-Siddharth there is no problem watching this film. The message in the second half of the film, which is actually a twist, is instructive for today's young couples.

== Soundtrack ==
The music was composed by Trupti Chavan and the lyrics were penned by Nitin Kamble.

Track	Song	Singer(s)
1	"Shwasat Mogarachya"	Suresh Wadkar
2	"Jahala Jeev Ha"	Prasanjeet Kosambi
3	"Urichya Vedanela"	Swapnil Bandodkar
4	"Coffee Title Track"	Rohit Shyam Raut
