= Ajunahi Barsaat Aahe =

Indian Marathi television series

- Genre: Romance; Drama
- Screenplay by: Rohini Ninawe
- Directed by: Kedar Vaidya
- Starring: Mukta Barve; Umesh Kamat
- Theme music composer: Ashok Patki
- Opening theme: "Ajunahi Barsaat Aahe" by Swapnil Bandodkar and Devaki Pandit
- Country of origin: India
- Original language: Marathi
- No. of episodes: 212

Production
- Producer: Vidyadhar Pathare
- Camera setup: Multi-Camera
- Running time: 22 minutes
- Production company: Iris Productions

Original release
- Network: Sony Marathi
- Release: 12 July 2021 – 12 March 2022

Ajunahi Barsaat Aahe (transl. It is still raining) is an Indian Marathi television series that aired on Sony Marathi which was directed by Kedar Vaidya. The show was premiered from 12 July 2021 and stopped on 12 March 2022 which was produced by Vidyadhar Pathare under his own banner Iris Productions. The show starred Mukta Barve and Umesh Kamat in lead roles.

== Summary ==
It is the story of a couple, Meera and Adiraj who were in a relationship ten years ago but broke up due to some reason. They come face-to-face after ten years and now work in the same polyclinic. Will they fall in love again?

== Plot ==
Dr. Meera Desai is an ophthalmologist in Sanjeevan Polyclinic. Dr. Adiraj Pathak, a gynaecologist, has returned to Pune after ten years, coincidentally joins the same polyclinic. Both Adiraj and Meera are 35 years old and are unmarried hence a worrisome reason for their respective families. Adiraj's nephew, Malhar, and Meera's sister Manaswini (Manu), are in a relationship. Manu gets pregnant with Malhar's child.

Adiraj and Meera are shocked by this news and decide to meet each other and sort out the issue created by Malhar and Manu. Due to Malhar's irresponsible behavior, Meera's mother, who was hospitalized, her condition gets critical. When Meera and Manu disclosed this news to their family, they raged earlier but later accepted Manu's child and Malhar. Adiraj's mother visits Meera at her clinic and is impressed by her and hence decides to get her married to Adiraj without knowing their past.

Sulakshana invites Meera and her family on her birthday with a motive of Adiraj and Meera's relationship. Adiraj and Meera see this as an opportunity to introduce Manu to Adiraj's family. Malhar reveals his love for Manu to his parents, which they accept on Sulakshana's insistence with a condition of Adiraj getting married earlier. Meera and Adiraj indicate their reason for a break-up to Mitu and Amol, respectively. Ten years earlier, Adiraj leaked information about his and Meera's intimate and private moments to his friend, disheartening her.

At present, Nikhil proposes to Meera for marriage, but she denies it. On seeing this, Adiraj asks Meera for a patch-up. Adiraj's father wants him to marry his friend Pradeep Vaishampayan's daughter, Sanika Vaishampayan, to expand their hospital business. Sanika and Adiraj decide to try to fake a relationship for the sake of their families. Meera gets jealous seeing the duo. But soon, she starts to get attracted to him. When Ashwini deliberately reveals Manu's pregnancy to Madhura and Sulakshana, they deny the proposal for Manu and Malhar's marriage. Sudhir berates Malhar for his mistakes. Ashwini provokes Manu to elope with Malhar, and they marry. The Desai family accepts the wedding, but the Madhura and Sudhir do not take and accuse the Desai's to be frauds.

Manu enters the Pathak house are welcomed by Amol and Sulakshana but are not accepted by Sudhir and Madhura. Meera also accompanies Manu to the Pathak house for a few days, for which Adiraj, Sulakshana, and Amol get elated. Madhura and Sudhir turn cold towards Manu, Meera, and the Desai's. Meera encourages Sulakshana to get on her feet and leave the support of her wheelchair and succeeds. Amol asks Adiraj to propose to Meera, for which Sulakshana agrees. Adiraj and Meera, under one roof, spend some romantic time.

During the construction of Sudhir's new hospital, a mishap occurs, which causes significant deformation of him. Pradeep asks him to stay underground, and he will cover the matter for him. Meera, along with Adiraj, puts forth an opinion of confronting the media and clears all grounds of misconceptions amongst the press. Sudhir dislikes the approach and asks Meera to leave the Pathak house demeaning her. Meera returns to the Desai's. The same night, Adiraj and Meera confess their love for each other and decide to clear all misunderstandings and start a new relationship. Amol, Malhar, Manu, and Sulakshana help them while Sudhir, Madhura, Pradeep, p and Sanika oppose their unity.

Sanika gets obsessed with Adiraj and declares her desire to marry him to Pradeep. Pradeep starts manipulating the situation and forcing Sudhir and the Pathak's convince Adiraj to marry Sanika. Sudhir secretly meets Meera and manipulates her to break her relationship with Adiraj for his way out. When Police come to arrest Sudhir, he suffers a heart attack and gets admitted into his hospital. Madhura informs Meera about this and holds her responsible. Meera, to clear the situation, decides to break up with Adiraj and chooses to marry Nikhil.

Nikhil tries to double-cross Meera and targets Adiraj. Mitu overhears Pradeep and Nikhil's conversation and plot against Adiraj and Meera, respectively, and records it. On Adiraj and Saniks's engagement day, Meera and Mitu exposes Pradeep's evil plot and stop the engagement. Sudhir also breaks ties with him. Sulakshana convinces him of Adiraj and Meera's alliance. Madhura starts hating Meera, Manu, and the Desai for the past situation and disapproves of Meera and Adiraj's alliance. The duo spends some quality time together and decides to get married. Meera asks Adiraj to reveal the entire past to the Pathak's before their alliance.

When Madhura tries to leave the Pathak house, Adiraj tries to convince her. Sudhir convinces her by saying that he is namesake agreed to the marriage for Adiraj's happiness. Adiraj convinces her to stay, proving her point in a while. Soon the marriage preparations start Adiraj and Meera come closer. On the other hand, Nikhil desperately tries to break the marriage. But fails every time. With many obstacles in their way, finally, Adiraj and Meera get married.

On the second day after the wedding, the Pathak's learns about Adiraj and Meera's past relationship thanks to Nikhil's plot. Madhura, Sudhir, and Sulakshana get immensely angered with the revelation and do not accept Meera as their daughter-in-law. With Manu, Malhar, and Amol's help, they cleared the misunderstandings and accepted Pathak's except Madhura. Nikhil continues to plot against Adiraj and Meera simultaneously. Pradeep starts instigating Sudhir against Meera. With Nikhil's plot and mistake, Adiraj and Meera join Sulakshana Hospital, but their responsibilities make it hard to spend time with each other. When the Pathak's completely accept Manu and Meera, Madhura constantly disrespects and demines them due to misunderstandings.

Saurabh faces poor financial adversities, and Manu wants money for Malhar's start-up, asking Jayant and Shubhangi to sell the Desai residency. When Meera, along with her parents, disagrees with Manu and Saurabh's request, Manu starts growing cold towards Meera due to Madhura and Ashwini's instigation. During a heated argument with Meera, Manu collapses and loses her unborn child. Pradeep misguided Adiraj and tried to keep him away from the situation. Manu and Malhar blame Adiraj and Meera for this and start disrespecting them. Adiraj and Meera slowly started understanding the malpractice at the hospital and began to uncover them.

With growing differences in the family and constant fights, Adiraj and Meera decide to stage fake fights which would temporarily stop the family fights. Madhura senses their plan and even surfaces it to the family. Adiraj and Meera unintentionally pretend to have extra-marital affairs to the family. Finally, Adiraj and Meera are able to get the file of Sudhir and Pradeep's misdeeds.

The duo confront Sudhir who surrenders and blames it on Pradeep. Adiraj and Meera reveals all the secrets to the family and the Pathaks unite in peace.

Few months later

Pathak's have finally moved on leaving the bitter past. Adiraj and Meera introduce the newly evolved. Madhura has got her brand famous and is known as renowned Fashion Designer. Amol has won multiple Acting Awards and has busy schedules with Veteran Actors and Directors. Malhar's gaming app has a booming success. Manu has decided to complete her studies and decided to career oriented. Sudhir has revealed all his crimes but got bailed on his surrender and Pradeep is jailed and now practices Meditation and Yoga. On the other hand, Ashwini is revealed pregnant. Adiraj and Meera have taken over the Sulakshana Hospital and run it efficiently without any crime records. They then enjoy rain of happiness and makes their love immortal. The show ends on a happy note.

== Cast ==
=== Main ===
- Mukta Barve as Dr. Meera Desai Pathak – Ophthalmologist; Jayant and Shubhangi's elder daughter; Saurabh and Manu's sister; Adiraj's wife
- Umesh Kamat as Dr. Adiraj Pathak – Gynaecologist; Sulakshana and Sudhir's son; Madhura's brother; Meera's husband

=== Recurring ===
- Rajan Tamhane as Jayant Desai – Shubhangi's husband; Meera, Saurabh and Manu's father
- Suhita Thatte as Shubhangi Desai – Jayant's wife; Meera, Saurabh and Manu's mother
- Sachin Deshpande as Saurabh Desai – Jayant and Shubhangi's son; Meera and Manu's brother; Ashwini's husband
- Sharmila Rajaram Shinde as Ashwini Desai – Saurabh's wife
- Purva Phadake as Manaswini "Manu" Desai Karnik – Jayant and Shubhangi's younger daughter; Meera and Saurabh's sister; Malhar's wife
- Sanket Korlekar as Malhar Karnik – Madhura and Amol's son; Manu's husband.
- Rajan Bhise as Dr. Sudhir Pathak – Sulakshana's husband; Madhura and Adiraj's father; Malhar's grandfather
- Uma Sardeshmukh as Sulakshana Pathak – Sudhir's wife; Madhura and Adiraj's mother; Malhar's grandmother
- Samidha Guru as Madhura Pathak Karnik – Fashion designer; Sulakshana and Sudhir's daughter; Adiraj's sister; Amol's wife; Malhar's mother
- Mihir Rajda as Amol Karnik – Actor; Madhura's husband; Malhar's father

=== Others ===
- Vidyadhar Joshi as Dr. Pradeep Vaishampayan – Sudhir's friend; Sanika's father
- Prajakta Datar Ganpule as Sanika Vaishampayan – Pradeep's daughter; Adiraj's obsessed lover
- Nikhil Rajeshirke as Nikhil Diwan – Asawari's son; Meera's friend
- Smita Sarode as Asawari Diwan – Nikhil's mother
- Pallavi Vaidya as Dr. Mitali a.k.a. Mitu – Meera's friend
- Dipali Jadhav as Vanita – Sulakshana's care taker
- Siddhesh Prabhakar as Jay – Adiraj's friend

=== Guest appearances ===
- Mugdha Godbole-Ranade
- Priya Bapat as Priya – Meera's friend
