= Asambhav (2025 film) =

2025 Indian film by Sachit Patil

- Directed by: Sachit Patil; Pushkar Shrotri
- Screenplay by: Kapil Bhopatkar; Vishal Inamdar; Sachit Patil
- Story by: Kapil Bhopatkar
- Produced by: Sachit Patil; Nitin Prakash Vaidya; Sharmishtha Raut; Tejas Desai; Mangesh Parulekar; Sanjay Potdar
- Starring: Sachit Patil; Mukta Barve; Priya Bapat; Sandeep Kulkarni
- Cinematography: Prasad Bhende
- Edited by: Faisal Mahadik
- Music by: Score: Suyash Kelkar; Songs: Amitraj
- Production companies: Mumbai Pune Films Entertainment; Ericon Telefilms; P & P Entertainment; Nitin Vaidya Productions
- Distributed by: Panorama Studios
- Release date: 21 November 2025
- Running time: 140 minutes
- Country: India
- Language: Marathi

Asambhav (transl. The Impossible) is a 2025 Indian Marathi-language supernatural thriller film directed by Sachit Patil and co-directed by Pushkar Shrotri. The film stars Sachit Patil, Mukta Barve, Priya Bapat, and Sandeep Kulkarni in lead roles. The film was produced under the banners of Mumbai Pune Films Entertainment, Ericon Telefilms, and P & P Entertainment, and was distributed by Panorama Studios. It is a reincarnation drama that explores the themes of past life regression, mystery, and romance.

It had its gala premiere at the International Film Festival of India (IFFI) 2025 and was released theatrically on 21 November 2025.

== Plot ==
Mansi (Mukta Barve) is a talented architect who is haunted by recurring nightmares in which she witnesses a brutal murder inside a mysterious haveli (mansion). In her dreams, she sees a woman who is her exact double being stabbed to death. Disturbed by these visions, she rejects the marriage proposal of Aditya Deshmukh (Sachit Patil), a wealthy industrialist and her business collaborator.

During a professional assignment to Nainital, Mansi is shocked to discover the very haveli from her nightmares exists in reality. Alarmed by this revelation, Aditya contacts his close friend Dr. Satyajeet (Sandeep Kulkarni), a psychologist who specialises in Past Life Regression (PLR), a therapeutic technique using hypnosis to retrieve memories from previous lives.

Under PLR, Mansi uncovers that she was Urmila in her past life, and Aditya was her husband Madhav, who served as the legal advisor to Sadhana (Priya Bapat), the wealthy owner of the haveli. A scheming character named Vikram (Vineet Sharma) manipulates Urmila against Sadhana, leading to a tragic confrontation. As dark secrets from the past begin to surface, Mansi must choose between love and a terrifying truth that threatens to destroy both her present and future.

== Cast ==
- Sachit Patil as Aditya Deshmukh / Madhav
- Mukta Barve as Mansi / Urmila
- Priya Bapat as Sadhana
- Sandeep Kulkarni as Dr. Satyajeet
- Vineet Sharma as Vikram

== Production ==
Asambhav was conceived and directed by Sachit Patil, who also serves as one of the film's lead actors and producers. The film was co-directed by Pushkar Shrotri. The film was initially announced in October 2024 with Shrotri solely directing and an initial cast comprising Patil, Mukta Barve, Sai Tamhankar, and Satish Rajwade; however, Tamhankar and Rajwade were later replaced by Priya Bapat and Sandeep Kulkarni.

Principal photography ommenced in January 2025 and took place primarily in Nainital, Uttarakhand. The film marks the second collaboration between Barve and Bapat, following their successful venture Aamhi Doghi (2018). Bapat played a 75 years old woman in one of the film sequences, which used to take three and half hours for makeup.

== Soundtrack ==
Asambhav

Soundtrack album by Amitraj
- Released: 20 November 2025
- Genre: Feature film soundtrack
- Length: 8:05
- Language: Marathi
- Label: Zee Music Company

The music was composed by Amitraj. The lyrics were penned by Kshitij Patwardhan.

No.	Title	Singer(s)	Length
1.	"Sawartana"	Harshavardhan Wavare & Shilpa Pai	4:20
2.	"Bahar Nava"	Abhay Jodhpurkar, Aanandi Joshi	3:45
Total length:			8:05

== Release ==
It had its world premiere at the International Film Festival of India (IFFI) 2025 in Goa in November 2025. The film was subsequently released theatrically on 21 November 2025. It later became available on streaming platforms, including Amazon Prime Video and Plex.

== Reception ==
=== Critical Response ===
Asambhav received a mixed-to-positive response from critics.

A reviewer from Loksatta, Reshma Raikwar, praised the direction and locations, stating that "The location chosen by the writer-director for this mysterious story has actually become the biggest strength of this film." Lokmat rated the film 3.5 out of 5 stars, noting that it "Asambhav not only entertains you but also gives you the satisfaction of watching a good movie." Sakal critic Santosh Bhingarde also awarded 3.5 out of 5 stars, describing the film as “thrilling, shocking and somewhat scary,” with a strong layer of mystery.

=== Box Office ===
The film collected approximately ₹1.45 Crore in total gross earnings, with India net collections of around ₹1.34 Crore.
