= Lost and Found (2016 Indian film) =

- Official poster of Lost and Found - Marathi Film.
- Directed by: Ruturaj Dhalgade
- Written by: Ruturaj Dhalgade
- Screenplay by: Ruturaj Dhalgade
- Produced by: Golden Gate Motion Pictures, Vinod Malgewar
- Starring: Siddharth Chandekar; Spruha Joshi; Mangesh Desai; Mohan Agashe
- Cinematography: Ramesh Bhosale.
- Edited by: Jitendra Dongare
- Music by: Shubhankar Shembekar
- Production company: Golden Gate Motion Pictures
- Release date: 29 July 2016
- Country: India
- Language: Marathi

Lost and Found is a Marathi film produced by Vinod Malgewar under banner Golden Gate Motion Pictures. The movie is written and directed by Ruturaj Dhalgade, starring Spruha Joshi, Siddharth Chandekar, Mohan Agashe and Mangesh Desai. It is a love story with a difference of opinions.

== Plot ==
Lost & Found is basically a love story of Manas (Siddharth Chandekar) and Naina (Spruha Joshi) dealing with loneliness in their personal lives. Since loneliness has become a prominent part of our urban lives, Lost & Found empathizes ignored human emotions with a basic motive of bringing happiness in the lives of lonely people. The four characters – Manas, Naina, Maruti (Mangesh Desai) & Shrirang Kaka (Mohan Agashe) take an initiative against loneliness and thereby resurrecting their own lonely lives.

== Cast ==
- Siddharth Chandekar as Manas
- Spruha Joshi as Naina
- Mohan Agashe as Shrirang Kaka
- Mangesh Desai as Maruti
- Tejaswi Patil as Aparna
- Ritika Shrotri as Leena
- Gauri Konge as Mughda
- Shubhangi Damle as Nene Kaku

== Reviews ==
Mihir Bhanage of Times Entertainment gave the movie 2.5 stars and wrote "This is a film that falls in the not-very-good and not-very-bad category. You can give it a try". Pune Mirror wrote "I was happier with the director's (Ruturaj Dhalgade) previous film, "Slambook", which had a problematic ending but was far more enjoyable. This one is neither here nor there. It doesn't discuss the social issues connected with the theme adequately and doesn't make us care for the characters enough. Ultimately, it's just another Marathi film, releasing this week." Rasik Tirodkar of Marathistars.com wrote "A cliche-ridden film with a weak screenplay that makes very little emotional connect."

== Release ==
=== Theatrical ===
The film was theatrically released on 29 July 2016.

=== Home media ===
The film was digitally released on 1 February 2024 on Ultra Jhakaas.

== Soundtrack ==
The film's soundtrack is composed by Shubhankar Shembekar with lyrics penned by Dr.Rahul Deshpande & Spruha Joshi.

No.	Title	Music	Singer(s)	Length
1.	"Tu Saad De"	Shubhankar Shembekar	Hrishikesh Ranade	3:39
2.	"Aas Hi Navi"	Shubhankar Shembekar	Swapnaja Lele, Hrishikesh Ranade	4:33
3.	"Ye Na Zara"	Shubhankar Shembekar	Sonia Mundhe, Shubhankar	4:04
4.	"Saang Na"	Shubhankar Shembekar	Preeti Pillai, Shubhankar	5:12
5.	"Saawalya" (Female)	Shubhankar Shembekar	Priyanka Barve	3:42
6.	"Saawalya" (Male)	Shubhankar Shembekar	Hrishikesh Ranade	3:41
