= Nagarkar =

Nagarkar is a surname. Notable people with the surname include:

- Kiran Nagarkar (1942–2019), Indian novelist, playwright, film and drama critic and screenwriter
- Leela Chitnis (née Nagarkar; 1909–2003), Indian actress
- Rajashree Nagarkar, Indian performing artist and actress
- Ram Nagarkar (born 1995), Indian actor
- Sudeep Nagarkar (born 1988), Indian novelist and fiction writer
- Suman Nagarkar, Indian actress
