= Maharashtra State Film Award for Best Debut Actress =

Indian film award

- Awarded for: Debut Actress of an actress in a Marathi film
- Sponsored by: Maharashtra State Film Awards
- First award: 2000
- Final award: 2023

Highlights
- First winner: Rajashree Nagarkar
- Latest winner: Bhakti Ghogare

The Maharashtra State Film Award for Best Debut Actress is an award, presented annually at the Maharashtra State Film Awards of India since 2000, to an actress for their debut performance in a Marathi cinema film.

== Winners ==
Year	Actress	Film	Ref.
2000	Rajashree Nagarkar	Barkha Satarkar	
2001	Shital Kshirsagar	Ek Hoti Vadi	
2002	Vrinda Gajendra	Krishnakathchi Meera	
2003	Anita Kulkarni	Tu Na Mi	
2004	Mukta Barve	Chakwa	
2005	Veena Jamkar	Bebhaan	
2006	Rajashri Landge	Gadhvacha Lagna	
2007	Sonalee Kulkarni	Bakula Namdeo Ghotale	
2008	Radhika Apte	Gho Mala Asla Hava	
2009	Neha Pendse	Agnidivya	
2010	Mrunmayee Deshpande	Lek Mazi Gunachi	
2011	Sukhada Yash	Gajaar: Journey of the Soul	
2012	Shweta Salve	Kurukshetra	
2013	Shriya Pilgaonkar	Ekulti Ek	
2014	Pallavi Patil	Dhangarwada	
2015	Mugdha Chaphekar	The Silence	
2016	Vasanti Walke	Bandookya	
2017	Kiran Dhane	Palshichi P.T	
2018	Gauri Mahajan	Pushpak Vimaan	
2019	Ankita Lande	Girlz	
2020	Pallavi Patkar	Faas	
2021	Shruti Ubale	Bhramandhwani	
2022	Hruta Durgule	Ananya	
2023	Gauri Deshpande	Shyamchi Aai	
2023	Shraddha Khanolkar	Bhera	
2024	Bhakti Ghogare	Giran	

== See also ==
- Maharashtra State Film Award for Best Actress
- Maharashtra State Film Award for Best Supporting Actress
