= Ajit Parab =

Ajit Ankush Parab
- Genres: Indian film music
- Occupations: Music director, Composer, Music arranger, Programmer, Conductor, Playback singers, Film actor
- Years active: 2005–present

Ajit Parab (Marathi: अजित परब) is an Indian music director and composer and also a film playback singer and an actor. He is the recipient of Maharashtra State Film Award for Best Male Playback Singer.

== Career ==
Parab started his career as music director in the film Huppa Haiyya in Marathi. He composes music for films and has also sung songs in films. He does acting in the Marathi films.

He gave the music to the film Me Shivajiraje Bhosale Boltoy along with Ajay Atul. Recently, he gave the music to the film Natsamrat and also acted in it.

== Discography ==
=== Films ===
| Year | Film | Language | Contribution |
|---|---|---|---|
| 2010 | Huppa Huiyya | Marathi | Soundtrack |
| 2012 | Aayna Ka Bayna | Hindi | Soundtrack |
| 2008 | De Dhakka | Marathi | Soundtrack |
| 2010 | City of Gold | Marathi | Soundtrack |
| 2006 | Matichya Chuli | Marathi | Soundtrack |
| 2009 | Me Shivajiraje Bhosale Boltoy | Marathi | Soundtrack |
| 2016 | Natsamrat | Marathi | Soundtrack |
| 2025 | Bin Lagnachi Goshta | Marathi | Soundtrack |

=== Songs ===
| Song | Year | Film |
|---|---|---|
| Bhooli Bisri Yaadon Mein | 2005 | |
| Maharashtra Geet | 2014 | Mee Shivajiraje Bhosale Boltoy (Original Motion Picture Soundtrack) |
| Dhanadayak Stotra - Rin Mochan Mangal Stotra | 2013 | |
| Aayna Ka Bayna | 2014 | Aayna Ka Bayna (Original Motion Picture Soundtrack) |
| Masuli Wani Tujhi Ga Jwani | 2014 | Mee Shivajiraje Bhosale Boltoy (Original Motion Picture Soundtrack) |
| Moharuni Shwaas Jati | 2014 | Superstar (Original Motion Picture Soundtrack) |
| Kuthliya Indrachi | 2014 | Agadbam (Original Motion Picture Soundtrack) |
| Dhanadayak Stotra - Daridrya Dukh Dahan | 2013 | |
| Dhanadayak Stotra - Satynarayan Ashtakam | 2013 | |
| Dhanadayak Stotra - Ramashtakam | 2013 | |
| Dhanadayak Stotra - Rudrashtakam | 2013 | |
| Daridrya Dukh Dahan Shiv Stotra | 2013 | |
| Punha Din Raat | 2014 | |
| Shikshanachya Aaicha Gho (Original Motion Picture Soundtrack) Tee Nigun Geli Tari | 2012 | |
| Dhanadayak Stotra - Devkrit Lakshmi Stotra | 2013 | |
| Magic Mamu | 2014 | Kutumb (Original Motion Picture Soundtrack) |
| Dhanadayak Stotra - Indrakrit Mahalakshmi Stotra | 2013 | |
| Shiv Dhanadayak Stotra | 2005 | |
| Dhanadayak Stotra - Rin Mochan Lakshmi Nrisimha Stotra | 2013 | |
| He Samjhun Ghe Na Ya Babala | 2014 | Shikshanachya Aaicha Gho (Original Motion Picture Soundtrack) |
| Tu Guru Pita Tu Hi Mata | 2015 | |
| Baaje Dhol | 2014 | Nau Mahine Nau Divas (Original Motion Picture Soundtrack) |
| Jivanaat Tu Daru Nakoos | 2014 | Shikshanachya Aaicha Gho (Original Motion Picture Soundtrack) |
| Rashi Swami Kavach - Budha Kavach | 2013 | |
| Prem Aani Jeevan Donhi Sundar Kititari | 2012 | |
| Mi Gulam Tujha | 2005 | Aashirwad Ha Dattacha |
| Balle Balle | 2014 | Aayna Ka Bayna (Original Motion Picture Soundtrack) |
| Stone Paper Scissor | 2014 | Aayna Ka Bayna (Original Motion Picture Soundtrack) |
| Gheuntak | 2014 | Aayna Ka Bayna (Original Motion Picture Soundtrack) |
| Haath De Javad Ye | 2014 | Teecha Baap Tyacha Baap (Original Motion Picture Soundtrack)Aan De |
| Ase Faatlay | 2014 | Agadbam (Original Motion Picture Soundtrack) |
