= Costao =

Indian Hindi-language biographical crime drama film

- Promotional release poster
- Directed by: Sejal Shah
- Written by: Bhavesh Mandalia; Meghna Srivastava
- Produced by: Vinod Bhanushali; Kamlesh Bhanushali; Bhavesh Mandalia; Sejal Shah; Shyam Sunder; Faizuddin Siddiqui
- Starring: Nawazuddin Siddiqui; Priya Bapat; Kishore Kumar G Hussain Dalal; Mahika Sharma
- Cinematography: Rafey Mahmood
- Edited by: Unnikrishnan Payoor Parameswaran
- Production companies: Bhanushali Studios; Bombay Fables Motion Pictures; Side Hero Entertainment
- Distributed by: ZEE5
- Release date: 1 May 2025
- Running time: 124 minutes
- Country: India
- Language: Hindi

Costao is a 2025 Indian Hindi-language biographical crime drama film directed by Sejal Shah. The film stars Nawazuddin Siddiqui, Priya Bapat, Kishore, Hussain Dalal, and Mahika Sharma. It was written by Bhavesh Mandalia and Meghna Srivastava and produced by Vinod Bhanushali, Kamlesh Bhanushali, Bhavesh Mandalia, Sejal Shah, Shyam Sunder and Faizuddin Siddiqui.

Set in the 1990s, Costao is based on the true story of Costao Fernandes, a Goa Customs officer who sacrificed everything to dismantle a major gold smuggling operation. The film was released on 1 May 2025 on ZEE5.

== Plot ==
The film depicts the efforts of Costao Fernandes (portrayed by Nawazuddin Siddiqui), a customs officer in Goa during the 1990s. His dedication to law enforcement drives him to uncover a gold smuggling syndicate. Working on a tip, he follows the gold smugglers, and in an act of self defence kills Peter, who was running away with gold. Peter happens to be brother of a politician, who soon wins the upcoming state election and uses all state forces to crush Costao and give him an unjust trial.

The narrative follows Costao's actions as he works to expose the smugglers, facing significant personal and professional challenges along the way. His pursuit of justice results in conflict with the smuggling ring, leading to a series of tense events. Eventually, post two convictions in lower courts, the Supreme Court rules in his favour.

== Cast ==
- Nawazuddin Siddiqui as Costao Fernandes
- Priya Bapat as Maria Fernandes
- Kishore Kumar G as D'Mello
- Hussain Dalal as Peter D'Mello
- Mahika Sharma as Cassandra
- Davina Colaço
- Gagan Dev Riar as Sameer Narang, Addnl SP, CBI Officer
- Shravan Fondekar as Young Informer
- Arjun Kumar Shrivastav
- Dilkash Khan as Goon

== Production ==
Costao is produced by Bhanushali Studios Limited and Bombay Fables Motion Pictures, with a screenplay written by Bhavesh Mandalia and Meghna Srivastava. The story of Costao is based on real-life events surrounding a gold smuggling operation in 1990s Goa, and the film highlights the personal and professional challenges faced by Costao Fernandes. Filming took place on location in Goa, with cinematography by Rafey Mehmood and editing by Unnikrishnan Payoor Parameswaran.

== Release ==
Costao was released on 1 May 2025 on the ZEE5 streaming platform. The trailer was released in mid-April 2025.

== Reception ==
Costao received positive reviews from critics, with particular praise for Nawazuddin Siddiqui's performance and the film's storytelling, direction, and pacing:

Pinkvilla called Costao "one of the rare Hindi OTT delights these days" and praised Nawazuddin Siddiqui for playing "a larger-than-life hero most realistically. Lachmi Deb Roy of Firstpost lauded the film as a "delightful movie" with a "terrific performance" by Siddiqui, appreciating its restrained storytelling and honest portrayal of real events. Ronak Kotecha from The Times of India gave a mixed review, stating that Siddiqui's brilliance was evident, but the sluggish pacing and weak script diminished the impact of the real-life story. Firstpost described the film as "a delightful movie" and commended Siddiqui's return to form, noting his "terrific performance" and the film's "beautifully restrained way of storytelling." News9Live referred to Costao as "a powerful blend of emotion, corruption, and Nawazuddin Siddiqui's brilliance," noting his performance as "layered, restrained, and deeply affecting. Moneycontrol highlighted Costao as "a sharp, engaging real-life drama," emphasizing Siddiqui's portrayal as "at his best." Arpita Sarkar of OTTplay gave a positive review, rating it 4.5/5 and commending Siddiqui's natural acting and the film's enthralling narrative through the daughter's perspective, though she noted minor issues with plot execution.
