= Bin Lagnachi Goshta =

2025 Marathi film by Aditya Ingale

- Directed by: Aditya Ingale
- Written by: Aditya Ingale; Sameer Vasant Kulkarni
- Produced by: Nitin Prakash Vaidya
- Starring: Umesh Kamat; Priya Bapat; Girish Oak; Nivedita Saraf
- Cinematography: Amol Salunke
- Edited by: Mayur Hardas
- Music by: Ajit Parab
- Production companies: Nitin Vaidya Productions; Godgift Entertainment Pvt. Ltd.; S.N. Productions LLP
- Distributed by: Panorama Studios
- Release date: 12 September 2025
- Running time: 134 minutes
- Country: India
- Language: Marathi

Bin Lagnachi Goshta (transl. A Story Without Marriage) is a 2025 Indian Marathi-language romantic comedy-drama film directed and co-written by Aditya Ingale. The film stars Umesh Kamat and Priya Bapat in the lead roles, with Girish Oak, Nivedita Saraf, Sukanya Kulkarni, and Sanjay Mone in supporting roles. It was produced by Nitin Prakash Vaidya under Nitin Vaidya Productions, in association with Godgift Entertainment Pvt. Ltd. and S.N. Productions LLP. The film was theatrically released on 12 September 2025, and later premiered on Amazon Prime Video on 24 October 2025.

== Plot ==
Ashay and Ritika are a young couple living together in London, navigating their relationship outside the bounds of traditional marriage and against the expectations of their families. When Ritika becomes pregnant, the couple hires domestic help to manage their responsibilities. Each person they bring into their home arrives with their own quirks, secrets, and emotional complexity, setting off a chain of events that forces Ashay and Ritika to confront questions of love, trust, commitment, and what it truly means to build a life together.

== Cast ==
- Umesh Kamat as Ashay
- Priya Bapat as Ritika
- Girish Oak as Madhav Tambe
- Nivedita Saraf as Uma
- Sukanya Kulkarni as Ashay's mother
- Sanjay Mone as Ashay's father

== Production ==
Bin Lagnachi Goshta was announced in July 2025. The film marks the reunion of lead actors Umesh Kamat and Priya Bapat on the big screen after a gap of 12 years. It also reunited the popular pair of Girish Oak and Nivedita Saraf following their successful television serial Aggabai Sasubai.

== Soundtrack ==
The music for the film is composed by Ajit Parab, while the lyrics are penned by Vaibhav Joshi. The song "Pan Ya Egocha" is sung by actresses Priya Bapat and Bharati Achrekar.

No.	Title	Singer(s)	Length
1.	"Mala Tu Tula Mi"	Rishikesh Kamerkar, Sanjyoti Jagdale	2:04
2.	"Pan Ya Egocha"	Priya Bapat, Bharati Achrekar	2:42
3.	"Aata Re Aata Ga"	Ajit Parab	3:03
Total length:			7:50

== Release ==
Bin Lagnachi Goshta was released theatrically in India on 12 September 2025. Following its theatrical run, the film premiered on Amazon Prime Video on 24 October 2025, with English subtitles. Upon release, director Subhash Ghai, actor-director Riteish Deshmukh, actresses Genelia D'Souza and Shriya Pilgoankar praised the chemistry between the lead actors.

== Reception ==
It received a mixed-to-positive response from audiences and critics.

Santosh Bhingarde of Sakal gave the film 3 out of 5 stars and wrote, "The ethics and thoughts of one generation and an older generation in today's modern era, and the conflict between them, have been beautifully captured."

=== Box office ===
Although the film received a generally positive response, its box office collection was affected by the same-day release of Dashavatar and Aarpar.
