= Gachchi (film) =

- Directed by: Nachiket Samant
- Written by: Yogesh Vinayak Joshi
- Produced by: Vidhi Kasliwal, Nitin Prakash Vaidya
- Starring: Priya Bapat, Abhay Mahajan
- Cinematography: Riju Das
- Edited by: Ninad Khanolkar
- Music by: Yogesh Vinayak Joshi
- Release date: 22 December 2017
- Running time: 102 minutes
- Country: India
- Language: Marathi

Gachchi (also called The Terrace) is a 2017 Indian Marathi-language film directed by Nachiket Samant in his directorial debut. Produced by Nitin Prakash Vaidya and Vidhi Kasliwal. The film stars Abhay Mahajan and Priya Bapat in lead roles. Gachchi was theatrically released on 22 December 2017.

== Cast ==
- Priya Bapat as Keerti
- Abhay Mahajan as Shriram
- Asha Shelar as Shriram's Mother
- Anant Jog as Jagtap
- Mayureshwar Kale as Raju
- Swapnaneel Jaykar as Jagtap's Lawyer

== Soundtrack ==
Gachchi

Soundtrack album by Avinash-Vishwajeet
- Released: December 2017
- Genre: Film soundtrack
- Length: 3:15
- Label: Landmarc Films

The songs were composed by Avinash Vishwajeet with lyrics by Priya Bapat and Abhay Mahajan.

No.	Title	Singer(s)	Lyricist	Length
1	Tu Mi Ani Gachchi	Priya Bapat, Abhay Mahaja	Omkar Kulkarni	3:15
