= Pindadaan =

2016 Indian film

- Directed by: Prashant Patil
- Starring: Siddharth Chandekar; Manava Naik; Paula McGlynn
- Cinematography: Bunty Deshpande
- Edited by: Nilesh Gavand
- Music by: Sagar Dhote
- Release date: 17 June 2016
- Country: India
- Language: Marathi

Pindadaan is an Indian Marathi language film directed by Prashant Patil. The film stars Siddharth Chandekar, Manava Naik and Paula McGlynn. Music by Sagar Dhote. The film was released on 17 June 2016.

== Synopsis ==
When Ashutosh, a London-based director, documents the death rituals in Maharashtra, he falls for Anna, a Briton. Rudrababa, a priest, is surprised to see him and reveals a shocking truth about him.

== Cast ==
- Siddharth Chandekar as Ashutosh
- Manava Naik as Ruhi
- Paula McGlynn as British Girl Anna
- Sanjay Kulkarni as Tukaram

== Soundtrack ==
Pindadaan

Soundtrack album by Sagar Dhote
- Released: 2016
- Recorded: 2016
- Genre: Feature film soundtrack
- Length: 17:48
- Language: Marathi

Official audio
- Pindadaan – Full Album on YouTube

Track listing
No.	Title	Singer(s)	Length
1.	"Hey Mann Jhale Tujee"	Aanandi Joshi	4:42
2.	"Kadhi Ni Kase"	Priyanka Barve, Rohit Raut	3:22
3.	"Niraadhar"	Savani Ravindra, Abhay Jodhpurkar	4:19
4.	"Ka He Ase Sang Na"	Savani Ravindra	3:06
5.	"Majhe Tujhe Nate Ase"	Abhay Jodhpurkar	2:59
Total length:			17:48

== Critical response ==
Pindadaan film received negative reviews from critics. Ganesh Matkari of Pune Mirror wrote "It is painful to see good resources wasted on obviously flawed projects when there is a dearth of funding for meaningful cinema". Soumitra Pote of Maharashtra Times gave the film 2 stars out of 5 and wrote "We were entertained while watching all this. But when we think about things, we get disappointed. Despite the good financial support, expensive costumes, glamorous actors, this 'daan' seems like a hobby only because the 'Daan' required for the film has not been completed". Reshma Raikwar of Loksatta wrote "The last few minutes reveal many things from the first frame of the film. Then we have to be satisfied that what we saw had some meaning".
