= Mi Shivajiraje Bhosale Boltoy! =

Me Shivajiraje Bhosale Boltoy
- Theatrical release poster
- Directed by: Santosh Ramdas Manjrekar
- Written by: Abhijit Deshpande; Mahesh Manjrekar
- Produced by: Sanjay Chhabria; Ashwami Manjrekar
- Starring: Mahesh Manjrekar; Sachin Khedekar; Makarand Anaspure; Suchitra Bandekar; Siddarth Jadhav; Priya Bapat; Abhijeet Kelkar
- Music by: Ajit; Sameer; Atul
- Production company: Everest Entertainment
- Distributed by: Everest Entertainment; Eros International
- Release date: 3 April 2009
- Running time: 120 minutes
- Country: India
- Language: Marathi
- Budget: ₹3 Crore
- Box office: ₹25 Crore

Mi Shivajiraje Bhosale Boltoy (transl. I'm Shivajiraje Bhosale Speaking) is a 2009 Indian Marathi language vigilante action drama film produced by Sanjay Chhabria along with Ashwami Manjrekar and directed by Santosh Ramdas Manjrekar. The film follows an underdog who fights against the evils in society, to re-instate his identity and keep his pride. This film won the Maharashtra State Film Award for Best Film.

== Plot ==
Dinkar Maruti Bhosale is a Maharashtrian bank clerk who feels his Marathi identity is getting lost in cosmopolitan Mumbai. Dinkar feels Mumbai is in Maharashtra but there is no Maharashtra left in Mumbai. He always complains about the lack of respect a Maharashtrian receives in Mumbai and feels he is victimized everywhere because he is a Maharashtrian; little realizing that he has brought this situation upon himself.

In a state of sheer frustration Dinkar gets up one day cursing himself for being born a Marathi. He feels his ancestors must have committed a heinous crime for him to be born a Marathi.

These outbursts of Dinkar reach Pratapgad and the spirit of Chhatrapati Shivaji Maharaj is awakened. Dinkar has to now face a seething Shivaji Maharaj, who is furious at him. Shivaji Maharaj fires Dinkar for his shallow thinking and tells him he has to command respect, not demand it. He blames Dinkar's thinking for the sorry state of Maharashtrians. "Before blaming other communities for your shortcomings, look within and see if you have done anything to keep the Marathi pride intact," he roars.

Dinkar realizes his mistake but does Shivaji Maharaj's thought rouse him to rectify his mistakes? The film ends with Bhonsle gladly returning the sword at the shrine of Shivaji I.

== Cast ==
- Sachin Khedekar as Dinkar Maruti Bhosle
- Mahesh Manjrekar as Chhatrapati Shivaji Maharaj
- Suchitra Bandekar as Sumitra Dinkar Bhosale
- Priya Bapat as Shashikala Dinkar Bhosale / B. Kala
- Abhijeet Kelkar as Rahul Dinkar Bhosle
- Makarand Anaspure as Raiba (Shivaji Maharaj's servant)
- Vidyadhar Joshi as Ramniklal Gosalia (corrupt builder)
- Ganesh Yadav as Nandkumar Chandekar (corrupt politician)
- Siddharth Jadhav as Usmaan Bhai Parkar (Gosalia's goon)
- Pradeep Patwardhan as BMC Head officer
- Medha Manjrekar as Mrs. Usmaan Bhai Parkar (Usmaan Bhai's wife)
- Vineet Kumar Singh as Dubey tenant to Dinkar and Taxi Driver
- Kishore Pradhan as V. Gopalkrishnan (branch manager and Dinkar's employer)
- Meghana Erande as TV journalist
- Kamlesh Sawant as ACP Rege
- Reema Lagoo as Jijabai
- Atul Kale as Gidwani /Gaikwad (film director)
- Jaywant Wadkar as Gosalia's henchman
- Dhananjay Mandrekar as Kadam (BMC inspection officer)
- Vinay Yedekar as Dr. Chitnis
- Sanjay Khapre as Hiroji Indulkar (special appearance)
- Bharat Dabholkar as General Afzal Khan in Powada song (special appearance)
- Bharat Jadhav as Powada presenter (special appearance)
- Ankush Chaudhari as Shashikala's co-actor in song "Masoli" (special appearance)

== Soundtrack ==
The song O Raje marked the debut of Sukhwinder Singh in Marathi film industry. He won Maharashtra State Film Award for Best Male Playback Singer.

No.	Title	Artist(s)	Length
1.	"O Raje"	Sukhwinder Singh	4:20
2.	"Masoli"	Ajit Parab, Bela Shende	4:15
3.	"Maharastra Geet"	Ajit Parab	3:55
4.	"Maharajanchi Keerti Befaam (Powada)"	Nandesh Umap	8:34

== Box office ==
Me Shivajiraje Bhosale Boltoy opened on 9 April 2009 and was a huge blockbuster at the box office, becoming popular even among non-Maharashtrians. The film grossed ₹2.70 crore in its opening week. It collected a total of ₹25.5 Crore in its full theatrical run. It held the record of highest-grossing movie for many years until the release of Duniyadari which broke its record by collecting ₹30 Crore at the box office.

== Remake ==
The film was remade in Bengali as Ami Shubhash Bolchi (2011), directed by the original film's lead actor Mahesh Manjrekar with Mithun Chakraborty and Anindya Banerjee. But the film's main character was replaced and slightly changed with environment.

== Accolades ==
Year	Ceremony	Category	Result	Ref.
2009	Maharashtra State Film Award	Maharashtra State Film Award for Best Film	Won	

== See also ==
- Highest grossing Marathi films
