= Pune Via Bihar =

2014 Indian Marathi-language film

- Theatrical release poster
- Directed by: Sachin Goswami
- Written by: Sachin Mote; Sachin Goswami
- Produced by: Atul Maru; Ketan Maru
- Starring: Bharat Jadhav; Umesh Kamat; Mrunmayee Deshpande; Arun Nalavade; Bhalchandra Kadam; Kishori Ambiye
- Music by: Amir Hadkar
- Release date: 31 January 2014
- Running time: 133 minutes
- Country: India
- Language: Marathi

Pune Via Bihar (Marathi: पुणे व्हाया बिहार) is a 2014 Indian Marathi-language romantic drama film directed by Sachin Goswami and produced by Atul Maru and Ketan Maru. The film stars Umesh Kamat, Mrunmayee Deshpande and Bharat Jadhav in lead roles.

== Cast ==
- Bharat Jadhav as Nishikant Nimbalkar
- Umesh Kamat as Abhijeet Bhosle
- Mrunmayee Deshpande as Tara Yadav
- Sunil Kumar as Baldev
- Arun Nalavade as Abhi's father
- Bhalchandra Kadam

== Reception ==
The Times of India gave 2.5 stars out of 5 stars and saying the story isn't new but feels relevant due to the Bihari–Maharashtrian conflict and the cross-state love story. Maharashtra Times gave 2.5 stars out of 5 stars, noted that the film uses sharp dialogues to highlight Marathi identity and the Bihari influx into Maharashtra, packaging these themes into a lively and entertaining experience.

Divya Marathi wrote Pune Via Bihar is an entertaining love story with crisp, Marathi-flavoured dialogues and a fast-paced screenplay. Umesh Kamat is sincere, Mrunmayee Deshpande fits her role perfectly, while Bharat Jadhav and Arun Nalawade stand out. The music suits the love story, despite a few forced songs.

== Soundtrack ==
S. No.	Title	Singer(s)	Length
1	"Prem Mhanje Prem Aste"	Ranvir, Chang	5:03
2	"Ping Pong Ping Pong"	Neha Rajpal, Avadhoot Gupte, Balchandra Kadam	4:52
3	"Kacchi Kairi Hu"	Sonu Kakkar, Raja Hasan	4:55
4	"Bhid Bhid Bhidu"	Pranil More, Avadhoot Gupte	3:00
