= Aandhali Koshimbir =

2014 film directed by Aditya Ingale

- Theatrical release poster
- Directed by: Aditya Ingale
- Story by: Pratap Deshmukh
- Produced by: Sudha Productions
- Starring: Ashok Saraf; Vandana Gupte; Anand Ingale
- Edited by: Pravin Jahagirdar
- Music by: Narendra Bhide
- Release date: 30 May 2014
- Running time: 148 minutes
- Country: India
- Language: Marathi

Aandhali Koshimbir (Marathi: आंधळी कोशिंबीर) is a 2014 Marathi comedy film directed by Aditya Ingale and starring Ashok Saraf, Vandana Gupte and Anand Ingale.

== Plot ==
Aandhali Koshimbir is about a lonely father Bapu and his son Ranga and about a lonely woman, Shanti, and her landlord Marne, a lawyer and a bad poet who is in love with her.

For monetary reasons, Ranga and his friend, Vashya, decides to bring home Shanti to meet Bapu to get them to start a quarrel. Because she is more powerful in quarrel, Ranga thinks she will win over Bapu in the quarrel, and that Bapu will lose his confidence, and they will therefore have their problem solved by getting money from Bapu. They tell each of Bapu and Shanti both that the other one is mentally out of control and that their lost spouses were exactly same looking as Bapu and Shanti, and if they come and have a big quarrel, the other patient might get cured. As planned, Shanti comes home to have a quarrel with Bapu, and Bapu prepares to quarrel, too. But Bapu and Shanti fall in love instead.

Bapu invites Shanti to stay at his place for a few days, and the situation becomes more complicated for Ranga and Vashya, and Marne too, as he can not recite his poems to Shanti. At the Bapu house, all the lonely characters come together eventually and become a family. But Marne becomes increasingly lonely with his poems and becomes a villain. As he learns of Ranga's plan, he blackmails him and lodges a court case against Bapu and Shanti. While siding with Marne, Ranga still helps Bapu and Shanti to get rid of Marne, who in the end becomes insane.

== Reception ==
Professional ratings
Review scores
Source	Rating
Book My Show	3/5 stars
Marathimovieworld.com	3.5/5 stars

Aandhali Koshimbir was met with favorable reviews. Marathimovieworld gave it 3.5 out of 5 stars, calling it "a neat and clean comedy". Bookmyshow.com gave it 3 out of 5 stars and had the verdict "A quarreling contest gone wrong."

== Cast ==
- Ashok Saraf as Bapu Sadavarte
- Vandana Gupte as Shanti Chitnis
- Anand Ingale as Adv. Marne
- Aniket Vishwasrao as Ranga
- Hemant Dhome as Vashya
- Hrishikesh Joshi as Goraksha
- Priya Bapat as Manju
- Mrunmayee Deshpande as Radhika
