= Humne Jeena Seekh Liya =

- Theatrical Poster
- Directed by: Milind Ukey
- Written by: Milind Ukey
- Screenplay by: Kedar Jape; Milind Ukey
- Story by: School Life
- Based on: Marathi School
- Produced by: Meenakshi Ukey; Kusum Ukey; Amarjeet Amle
- Starring: Siddharth Chandekar; Mrunmayi Deshpande
- Narrated by: Shafiq Sheikh; Vishwas Natek
- Cinematography: Devendra Golatkar
- Edited by: Subodh Narkar
- Music by: Pranit Gedham
- Production company: Ukey Films
- Distributed by: Ukey Films
- Release date: 4 January 2008
- Running time: 123 minutes
- Country: India
- Language: Hindi
- Budget: 70-Lakh
- Box office: 30-Lakh

Humne Jeena Seekh Liya (English: We Have Learned To Live) is a 2008 Indian coming of age drama and comedy film directed by Milind Ukey and starring Siddharth Chandekar, and Mrunmayee Deshpande. It was first released on 4 January 2008.

== Plot ==
Humne Jeena Seekh Liya is adapted from a Marathi novel titled Shaala (School), and is a coming of age story of four school friends.

Ashwin (Siddharth Chandekar), Lochya (Omkar Bhatkar), Vankat and Salman (Pratik Shelar) are inseparable friends at the New English School. They are experiencing the onset of adulthood through teenage crushes, difficult teachers, and social upheavals in the news. They want to be a different generation, but have few clues as to what or how to change the world.

== Cast ==
- Siddharth Chandekar as Ashwin Joshi
- Mrunmayee Deshpande as Pari
- Girish Oak as Manohar Joshi
- Reema Lagoo as Mrs Joshi, Ashwin Mother
- Priya Marathe as Rani Joshi
- Milind Gunaji as Professor Kulkarni.
- Rekha Rao as Ghamadia Teacher
- Shrivallabh Vyas as School Principal
- Raju Kher as Mr Sharma
- Gaurav Chopra as Vijay, Social Activist
- Pratik Shelar as Salman
- Rajsingh Verma as rajmama alias Love Guru
- Rutuja Shinde as Mohini
- Omkar Bhatkar as Lochya
- Ganesh Yadav as Lochya's father

== Soundtrack ==
Humne Jeena Seekh Liya

Soundtrack album by Pranit Gedham
- Released: November 2007

The music of Humne Jeena Seekh Liya was composed by Pranit Gedham

No.	Title	Artist(s)	Length
1.	"Mera Yaar Tu"	Kailash Kher, Sunidhi Chauhan	5:52
2.	"Thoda Sa Kar De Karam"	Kunal Ganjawala
3.	"Oh Priya"	Mahalakshmi Iyer, Pranit	5:58
