= Kshipra Joshi =

Indian rhythmic gymnast

- Full name: Kshipra Joshi
- Born: 1994 (age 31–32)

Gymnastics career
- Discipline: Rhythmic gymnastics
- Country represented: India
- Former coach: Varsha Upadhye
- Retired: Yes

Kshipra Joshi (born 1994) is a former Indian rhythmic gymnast who competed in the 2010 Gymnastics World Championships and 2010 Commonwealth Games. Kshipra now a coach at Premier rhythmic gymnastics academy. She is also recognised as an International level judge by the International Gymnastics Federation. She made and holds a Guinness World Records for 18 rotations in a '180-degree balance position' in one minute, the record was made on 21 March 2011 on the set of Guinness World Records (Indian TV series) in Mumbai. She was awarded the "Shiv Chhatrapati Krida Puraskar" in March 2011 by the Government of Maharashtra.

== Education ==
Kshipra Joshi received her secondary education from the Balmohan Vidyamandir, located in Shivaji Park. Followed by a Bachelor of Arts degree in History from Ramnarain Ruia College, Mumbai.

== See also ==
- Akshata Shete—confrère
- Spruha Joshi—elder sister
