= Ritika Shrotri =

Indian actress (born 2000)

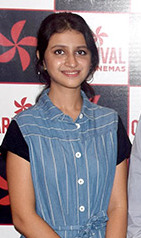
- Shrotri in 2019
- Born: 20 December 2000 (age 25); Pune, Maharashtra
- Occupation: Actress
- Parent(s): Atul Shrotri; Netra Shrotri

Ritika Shrotri is an Indian actress from Pune, Maharashtra. She predominantly appears in Marathi films. She has passed SSC exam from SPM English School, Sadashiv Peth, Alandi and is now attending S P college pune.

== Career ==
She started her career as a child actor and appeared in the serial Guntata Hriday He with Mrinal Kulkarni, Pallavi Subhash, Sandeep Kulkarni in the role of Devi and in the film Prem Mhanje Prem Mhanje Prem Asta directed By Mrinal Kulkarni in the role of Ashu. In 2012, she appeared in Dabba Gul and Be dune 10 TV series. She made her Marathi film debut as a lead actress in Marathi film Slambook which is released in August 2015 with Dilip Prabhavalkar, Kushal Badrike, Usha Nadkarni, Shantanau Ragnekar. She also had a role in Marathi short film Tya Ratri. In 2017, Shrotri performed the role of Grace in the Super-hit Marathi feature film Boyz produced by Avadhoot Gupte playing an item number. After that, she appeared in Bucket List with Madhuri Dixit, Sumeet Raghavan which was released in 2018.

== Filmography ==
Year	Film	Role	Language	Notes	Ref.
2012	Prem Mhanje Prem Mhanje Prem Asta	Ashu	Marathi		
2015	Slam Book	Aparna	Marathi		
2016	Lost And Found	Leena	Marathi		
2017	Boyz	Grace	Marathi		
2018	Bucket List	Radhika Sane	Marathi		
2019	Takatak	Meenakshi	Marathi		
2021	Darling	Babli	Marathi	Nominated for MFK Award for Favourite Actress	
2021	Meenakshi Sundareshwar	Mukai	Hindi	Hindi debut	
2023	Sari	Dia	Marathi		
2023	Boyz 4	Grace	Marathi		
2023	London Misal	Raavi	Marathi		
2025	Mu. Po. Bombilwaadi	Kundalini	Marathi		
2025	Raid 2	Jaya	Hindi		
2025	Vadapav	Kavya	Marathi		

== Television ==
Year	Serial	Role	Channel
2011-2012	Guntata Hriday He	Devi	Zee Marathi
2012	Gunda Purush Dev	–	ETV Marathi
2012	Dabba Gul	Ritika	Zee Marathi
2014	Be Dune Daha	Kavya	Star Pravah
