= Hey Kay Navin? =

Indian Marathi language web series

- Genre: Drama; Slice of life
- Created by: Varun Narvekar
- Directed by: Varun Narvekar
- Starring: Priya Bapat; Umesh Kamat; Shubhangi Gokhale; Uday Tikekar
- Country of origin: India
- Original language: Marathi
- No. of seasons: 2
- No. of episodes: 8

Production
- Production companies: Pratisaad Productions; Bahawa Entertainment

Original release
- Network: ZEE5 (Marathi)
- Release: 31 March 2026

Hey Kay Navin? is an Indian Marathi language drama web series directed by Varun Narvekar. Produced by Pratisaad Productions and Bahawa Entertainment, the series stars real-life couple Priya Bapat and Umesh Kamat in the lead roles. The show was released on ZEE5 on 31 March 2026.

== Plot ==
Rama and Aditya are an urban couple who have been married for ten years and maintain stable corporate careers. The series follows Rama as she takes a four-month sabbatical from her job to launch a clothing brand. As she pursues her new business, the couple navigates professional challenges, societal expectations, and pressure from their in-laws to have children.

== Cast ==
- Priya Bapat as Rama
- Umesh Kamat as Aditya
- Shubhangi Gokhale as Rama's Mother
- Uday Tikekar as Rama's Father
- Suyog Gorhe as Nikhil
- Rajasi Bhave as Sakshi
- Omkar Govardhan as Swapnil
- Tanvi Kulkarni as Gauri
- Payal Jadhav as Rashmi
- Raunak Bhise as Purva
- Sakshi Mokadam as Isha

== Production ==
Hey Kay Navin? is the second digital project featuring Bapat and Kamat, who previously appeared together in the series Aani Kay Hava. Directed and written by Varun Narvekar, the series' trailer was released on 21 March 2026 on ZEE5.

== Episodes ==
Season 1
No. overall	No. in season	Title	Directed by	Original release date
1	1	"Something New"	Varun Narvekar	March 31, 2026
Rama, a corporate professional, decides to take a sabbatical to start her own clothing brand, "Kala," with her husband Aditya's support.
2	2	"Full Throttle"	Varun Narvekar	March 31, 2026
Rama begins setting up her venture, but quickly realizes that entrepreneurship is far more demanding than her previous corporate life.
3	3	"Reality Hits"	Varun Narvekar	March 31, 2026
As business pressures mount, Rama feels an emotional void and begins comparing her child-free life to the milestones of those around her.
4	4	"Nothing's Working"	Varun Narvekar	March 31, 2026
Technical setbacks and creative blocks leave Rama feeling defeated, causing her to deeply question her decision to leave her job.
5	5	"A Fresh Start"	Varun Narvekar	March 31, 2026
Encouraged by Aditya, Rama gains a new perspective and begins collaborating with a young designer to revive her vision.
6	6	"The First Order"	Varun Narvekar	March 31, 2026
The team works intensely on their first official client order, but the stress of a looming deadline begins to strain Rama’s nerves.
7	7	"The Biggest Question"	Varun Narvekar	March 31, 2026
A disastrous fitting trial leads to a major confrontation between Rama and Aditya, forcing them to address long-ignored issues in their marriage.
8	8	"The Turning Point"	Varun Narvekar	March 31, 2026
Following their argument, Rama and Aditya must decide if they are still emotionally aligned as they navigate the future of their relationship.

== Reception ==
The series received generally positive reviews with critics praising its portrayal of long-term marriage. Nandini Ramnath of Scroll.in called it a "seriocomic" exploration of "new-old ideas about marriage and motherhood," particularly praising Priya Bapat's performance. The Hindu noted Varun Narvekar's direction and the series' "slice-of-life" storytelling.
