= Spruha Joshi =

Marathi actress and poet (born 1989)

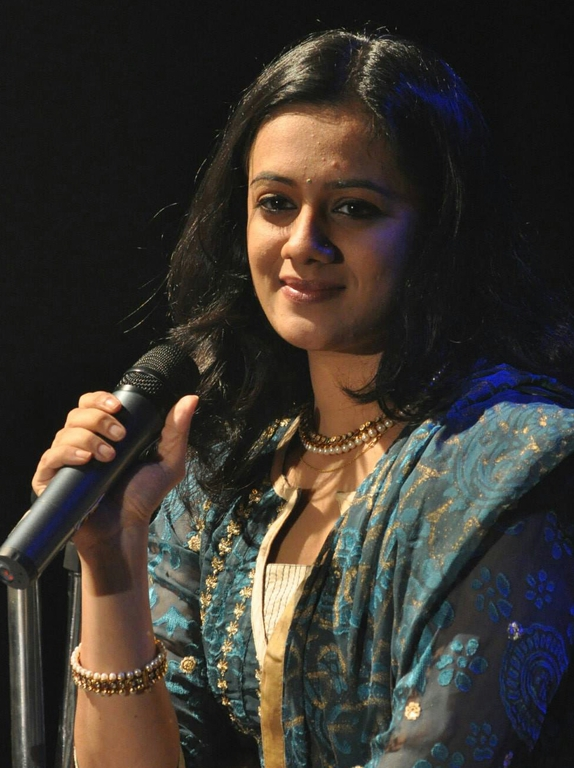
- Born: 13 October 1989 (age 36); Mumbai, Maharashtra, India
- Occupations: Actress; host; lyricist; anchor
- Spouse: Varad Laghate (m. 2014)
- Relatives: Kshipra Joshi (sister)
- Website: www.spruhaniya.com

Spruha Joshi (born 13 October 1989) is an Indian television, film, and theatre actress, the television anchor who works in the Marathi film and television industry. She is also a poet and lyricist for films.

== Early life and education ==
Spruha Joshi was born in Dadar, Mumbai, on 13 October 1989, the first child of Shirish Madhusudan Joshi and Shreeya Shirish Joshi (née Alaka Arvind Terdalkar). She completed her schooling from Balmohan Vidyamandir, Dadar, and then graduated from Ruia College.

== Career ==
She made her film acting debut in the 2004 drama movie Maay Baap. She played the role of a teenage classical music student. After her debut, she took a break from films to complete her graduation. While she was in Ramnarain Ruia College, she acted in many plays like GaMaBhaNa, Yugmak, Ek Aur Maiyyat, Santa, Ek Ashi Vyakti, Koi Aisa, Canvas and Ananyaa. Her first noticeable role on TV was of Uma Band in Agnihotra. In 2011, she was seen in the film Morya directed by Avadhoot Gupte. In the same year, she was seen in the TV show Eka Lagnachi Dusri Goshta as Kuhu starring Mukta Barve and Swapnil Joshi in lead roles. In 2012, she performed the lead role of Ramabai Ranade in Unch Majha Zoka, which was directed by Viren Pradhan. She also played child artist role in Marathi serial De Dhamal on Zee Marathi.

In 2013, Spruha was seen in the show Eka Lagnachi Tisri Goshta as a lead character Advocate Isha Deshmukh. Spruha's next film was A Paying Ghost alongside Umesh Kamat. The film received positive reviews from critics and audience. Spruha's next film Bioscope was released on 17 July 2015. It incorporates four short films directed by four different directors Ravi Jadhav, Gajendra Ahire, Girish Mohite, and Viju Mane – all based on four poems by well-known poets. Spruha will be seen in Viju Mane's Ek Hota Kau, based on poet Kishor Kadam's poem by same name. In addition to acting in films, Spruha also writes poems and lyrics for Marathi albums and movies. Spruha's next film Lost and Found will be releasing on 29 July. The film produced by Golden Gate Motion Pictures is a love story and has Siddharth Chandekar as the male lead. She starred in series Prem He on Zee Yuva in 2017 opposite Siddharth Chandekar, a series that depicted various situations among the journey of various loving couples. She also starred opposite Gashmeer Mahajani in Mala Kahich Problem Nahi in 2017. She also starred opposite Ankush Choudhary in Deva in 2018.

She was the anchor of Colors Marathi musical program Sur Nava Dhyas Nava. In 2019, she appeared in a Marathi thriller film Vicky Velingkar as Vidya. Sonalee Kulkarni is appearing in the film in titular role.

== Filmography ==
=== Films ===
Year	Title	Role	Notes	Ref.
2004	Maybaap	Manjiri	Child Artist	
2011	Morya	Bar Singer	Supporting Role	
2012	Sur Rahu De	Sonali	Lead Role	
2015	A Paying Ghost	Madhavi Mirajkar	Lead Role	
2015	Bioscope	Pakli	Lead Role	
2016	Paisa Paisa	Janhavi	Cameo role	
2016	Lost and Found	Naina	Lead Role	
2017	Mala Kahich Problem Nahi	Ketaki	Lead Role	
2017	Deva Ek Atrangee	Meera	Supporting Role	
2018	Home Sweet Home	Devika	Cameo role	
2019	Vicky Velingkar	Vidya	Supporting role	
2020	Atkan Chatkan	Mohi; Guddu's Mother	Supporting role	
2022	Coffee	Renuka	Lead Role	
2024	Shaktimaan	Seema		

=== Television and web series ===
Year	Title	Role	Channel/Platform	Ref.
2008–2010	Agnihotra	Uma Band	Star Pravah	
2011–2012	Eka Lagnachi Dusri Goshta	Kuhu Kale	Zee Marathi	
2012–2013	Unch Majha Zoka	Ramabai Ranade	Zee Marathi	
2013–2014	Eka Lagnachi Tisri Goshta	Isha Deshmukh	Zee Marathi	
2015	Kitchenchi Superstar	Host	Star Pravah	
2017	Prem He	Shweta Pathak	Zee Yuva	
2018–2022	Sur Nava Dhyas Nava	Host	Colors Marathi	
2019	Rangbaaz Phirse	Rukmini Amarpal Singh	Supporting role ZEE5 originals web series	
2019–present	The Office	Geeta (Chaddha's Broker)	short role Hotstar's new label Hotstar Specials	
2022–2023	Lokmanya	Satyabhama (Tapi) Tilak	Zee Marathi	
2024	Sukh Kalale	Mithila	Colors Marathi	

=== Theatre ===
Year	Title	Role	Ref.
2011	Lahanpan Dega Deva		
2012	Never Mind		
2014	Nandi	Madhavi	
2015	Samudra	Nandini	
2015	Don't Worry Be Happy	Pranoti	
2023	Sankarshan Via Spruha	Spruha	

=== Commercial ===
Year	Brand
2019	Indeed
2019	Wakefit
2019	Rio Fusion Drink
2019	Jeevansathi.com
2019	Maruti Suzuki

=== Songs ===
As a Lyricist
Year	Song	Film	Ref.
2014	"Baavre Prem He"	Baavre Prem He	
2016	"Aas Hi Navi"	Lost and Found	
2016	"Saang Na"	Lost and Found	

== Personal life ==
Her father works in a Trimax Company and her mother is a housewife. Her younger sister Kshipra Joshi is a sportswoman. She is married to Varad Laghate on 28 November 2014. They were in a romantic relationship for five years prior to their marriage.

== Books written ==
1. Lopamudra Marathi: लोपामुद्रा
2. Chandanchura Marathi: चांदणचुरा - A collection of poems
