= Akshata Shete =

Indian rhythmic gymnast

- Full name: Akshata Shete
- Born: 1991 (age 34–35)
- Spouse: Ajinkya Jadhav (m. 2019)

Gymnastics career
- Discipline: Rhythmic gymnastics
- Country represented: India
- Former coach: Sanjeevani Purnapatre

Akshata Shete (born 1991) is an Indian former rhythmic gymnast. She competed at the World Championships in 2009 and 2010 and represented India at the 2010 Commonwealth Games. After she retired, she became a judge and founded the Bombay Physical Culture Association Rhythmic Club in Mumbai. She is a recipient of the Shiv Chhatrapati Award.

== Education ==
She earned her bachelor's degree in commerce (B.Com.) from R.A. Podar College. She then earned her MBA from Amity Global Business School during 2012–2013 and later on went to do a Post Graduation Diploma in Sport Management from International Institute of Sports Management, Mumbai.

== Gymnastics career ==
In 2009, Shete competed at her first World Championships in Mie, Japan as part of the first team of Indian gymnasts to compete at a Rhythmic Gymnastics World Championships. Due to the poor funding of the sport in India, the team's equipment did not meet international standards, and Shete and her teammates bought a set of equipment at the venue to share. Shete finished in 135th place.

In 2010, Shete and several teammates spent a month at a training camp in Moscow ahead of the 2010 World Championships, where she again represented India. She was also selected to compete at the 2010 Commonwealth Games, which took place in Delhi, along with Kshipra Joshi and Pooja Surve.

== Post-gymnastics career ==
After finishing her gymnastics career, Shete opened her own club and works as a coach. She also trained as a judge and has judged at international competitions. In 2019, she was elected for a four-year term to the technical committee of the Asian Gymnastics Union.
