= Don't Worry Be Happy (play) =

- Written by: Mihir Rajada
- Music by: Saiprasad Nimbalkar & Piyush Kulkarni

Premiere
- Directed by: Adwait Dadarkar

Don't Worry Be Happy is a Marathi drama by Mihir Rajda, which was produced on stage in Mumbai, India, in 2016, starring Spruha Joshi and Umesh Kamat in lead roles. Don't Worry Be Happy is produced by Nandu Kadam under the banner of Sonal Productions and directed by Adwait Dadarkar.

Don’t Worry Be Happy is a drama which "tells the problems of E-generation and tries to find solutions to it".

== Plot ==
The story of Don’t Worry Be Happy revolves around Akshay (Umesh Kamat) and Pranoti (Spruha Joshi), a 21st-century typical Marathi couple immersed in their career with proper family planning and a no children policy for five years of marriage. The story unravels as Pranoti is diagnosed with PCOD.

The reason for PCOD is stated as ‘stress’, and the couple try to figure out what exactly is the reason behind this ‘stress’ in their life and how to avoid it with a tinge of humour. The story which unfolds is a tale which is common in many of the households today. Infertility, marriage woes, extended family issues – everything is showcased in a delicate manner in the play.

== Cast ==
- Umesh Kamat as Akshay
- Spruha Joshi as Pranoti
- Mihir Rajada as Chintan
- Swanandi Tikekar

== Production ==
Department	Artists
Music	Saiprasad Nimbalkar & Piyush Kulkarni
Art Director	Pradeep Mulye
Light Designer	Amogh Phadake
Manager	Nandu Panashikar
Production Manager	Prasad Cheulkar

== Reception ==
According to Stylewhack.com, "the drama nevertheless is heart warming, laughter stimulating and of course giving goosebumps during certain scenes. You can feel the audience’s pulse as they laugh, whistle, clap and sob with Akshay and Pranoti."

== Accolades ==
Ceremony	Category	Nominee	Result	Ref.
Sanskruti Kaladarpan Awards 2016	Best Drama	Don't Worry Be Happy	Won	
Sanskruti Kaladarpan Awards 2016	Best Actor	Umesh Kamat	Won	
Sanskruti Kaladarpan Awards 2016	Best Actress	Spruha Joshi	Nominated	
Sanskruti Kaladarpan Awards 2016	Best Director	Adwait Dadarkar	Nominated	
Sanskruti Kaladarpan Awards 2016	Best Actor in supporting role	Mihir Rajada	Nominated	
Sanskruti Kaladarpan Awards 2016	Best Writer	Mihir Rajada	Nominated	
Sanskruti Kaladarpan Awards 2016	Best Lights	Amogh Phadake	Nominated	
Mata Sanmaan Awards 2016	Best Actor	Umesh Kamat	Nominated	
Mata Sanmaan Awards 2016	Best Actress	Spruha Joshi	Won	
Mata Sanmaan Awards 2016	Best Director	Adwait Dadarkar	Nominated	
Mata Sanmaan Awards 2016	Best Writer	Mihir Rajada	Nominated	
28th Maharashtra State Marathi Commercial Drama Competition	Best Drama	Don't Worry Be Happy	Won	
28th Maharashtra State Marathi Commercial Drama Competition	Best Actor	Umesh Kamat	Silver Medal	
28th Maharashtra State Marathi Commercial Drama Competition	Best Actress	Spruha Joshi	Silver Medal	
28th Maharashtra State Marathi Commercial Drama Competition	Best Writer	Mihir Rajada	First Prize	
28th Maharashtra State Marathi Commercial Drama Competition	Best Director	Adwait Dadarkar	Second Prize	
28th Maharashtra State Marathi Commercial Drama Competition	Best Lights	Amogh Phadake	Third Prize	
28th Maharashtra State Marathi Commercial Drama Competition	Best Set	Pradeep Mulye	Second Prize	
28th Maharashtra State Marathi Commercial Drama Competition	Best Costumes	Chaitrali Dongare	Second Prize	
28th Maharashtra State Marathi Commercial Drama Competition	Best Makeup Artist	Mahendra Zagade	Third Prize	
28th Maharashtra State Marathi Commercial Drama Competition	Best Music	Sai-Piyush	Second Prize	
Akhil Bharatiy Marathi Natya Parishad 2016	Best Actor	Umesh Kamat	Nominated	
