= Miss U Mister =

- Theatrical release poster
- Directed by: Sameer Joshi
- Written by: Sameer Joshi
- Produced by: Deepa Trasi; Suresh Mhatre
- Starring: Mrunmayee Deshpande; Siddharth Chandekar
- Cinematography: Kedar Gaikwad
- Edited by: Pravin Jahagirdar
- Music by: Aalap Desai
- Production companies: Mantra Vision Pvt. Ltd. Third Eye Kreative Films
- Release date: 29 June 2019
- Country: India
- Language: Marathi

Miss U Mister is a 2019 Indian Marathi-language romantic drama film directed by Sameer Joshi, It stars Mrunmayee Deshpande and Siddharth Chandekar in the leading roles. The film is produced by Mantra Vision Pvt. Ltd. and Third Eye Kreative Films. It was theatrically released on 29 June 2019.

== Cast ==
- Mrunmayee Deshpande as Kaveri
- Siddharth Chandekar as Varun
- Savita Prabhune as Vedha, Varun's mother
- Rajan Bhise as Varun's father
- Avinash Narkar as Shashank, Kaveri's father
- Radhika Vidyasagar as Nandini' Kaveri's mother
- Dipti Lele as Ruchita
- Hrishikesh Joshi as the friend of Kaveri's father

== Release ==
The film was theatrically released on 29 June 2019.

== Reception ==
=== Critical response ===
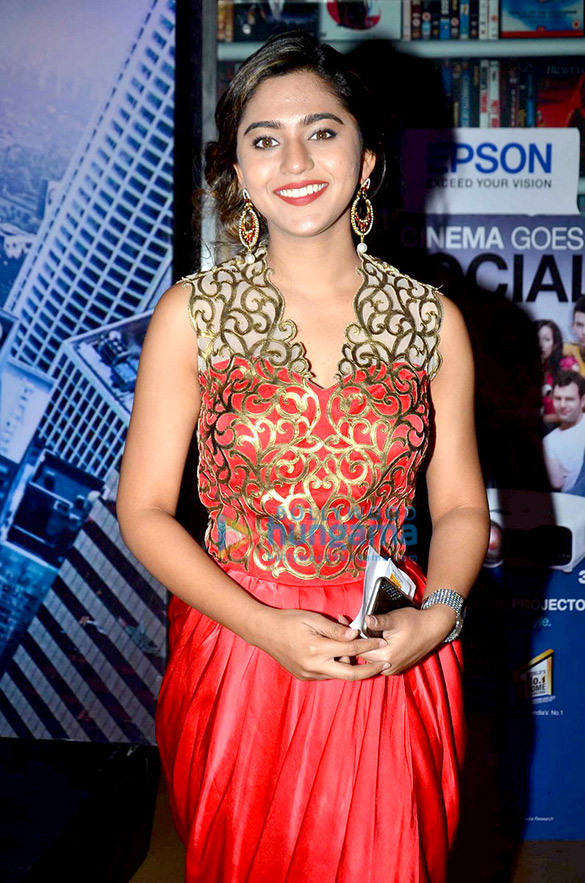
Mrinmayee Deshpande received critical acclaim for her performance in the film. she received her first state award for best actress. Also She Nominated for Filmfare Award for Best Actress – Marathi at Filmfare Marathi Awards 2020.

Mukund Kule of Maharashtra Times rated the film 2.5 stars out of 5, praising the music and performances while criticising the screenplay, saying "The subject matter of the film is serious, but the assurance that should be given to it through the creation of atmosphere, does not happen here." ABP Majha wrote "Although the story is good, its screenplay, if the events were more complex, it feels like these things could have been done easily." Chitrali Chogale of Times Now wrote "The story and subject matter of the film is different and something today's generation can relate to. It's good that the film's premise is well captured. The role of Savita Prabhune is especially noticeable, the bearing of her character is so well done that every scene of hers is truly a blast. So even though there are all these positive aspects, the second half of the movie goes astray."

== Soundtrack ==
The music composed by Alap Desai and lyrics are written by Vaibhav Joshi. "Tuzi Athvan" is sung by Desai and Aanandi Joshi and the second song "Yeshil Tu" is sung by Sonu Nigam, praised by Mihir Bhanage of The Times of India, he wrote "The song is a perfect combination of in-sync music and vocals. To sum up, both songs from this movie are worth playing on loop."

All lyrics are written by Vaibhav Joshi; all music is composed by Alap Desai.

Track listing
No.	Title	Singer (s)	Length
1.	"Tuzi Athvan"	Aanandi Joshi, Alap Desai	2:45
2.	"Yeshil Tu"	Sonu Nigam	2:49
Total length:			5:34
