= Milind Ingle =

- Born: Milind Ingle; Nagpur, Maharashtra, India
- Genres: Indian classical, Bollywood
- Occupations: Singer, Musician

Milind Ingle is a singer and music director from Nagpur, Maharashtra, India.

== Career ==
Milind's songs are mainly in Marathi and Hindi. Milind collaborated with poet/lyricist Saumitra (Kishor Kadam) on his Marathi album, Gaarva (गारवा) meaning "cool" (as in breeze). It is a compilation of six songs (plus one reprise) that describe the advent of the monsoon after a scorching summer. Each song is preceded by Soumitra's poetry, narrated by the poet himself.

The market success of Gaarva prompted the music director/singer/lyricist team to create a second one soon after, titled Saanj Gaarva (सांज गारवा), or "the evening breeze". The poetry reading precedes each song, this time by noted Marathi actor, Sachin Khedekar.

== Discography ==
=== Tuzya Tapor Dolyat Majhe Evlas Gaon (Marathi) ===
1. "Bhardar Kaya"
2. "Galavar Bat"
3. "Gol Gol Gaal"
4. "Kajal"
5. "Oth"
6. "Naak"
7. "Kasa Bolava Ughada"
8. Others

=== Gaarva (Marathi) ===
1. "Gaarva"
2. "Rimjhim Dhun"
3. "Gaar Vara Haa Bharaaraa"
4. "Zaadaakhaali Basalele"
5. "Paaus Daatalela"
6. "Punha Pavsaalaach Saangayche"
7. "Gaarva (Pavasanantarcha)"

=== Saanj Gaarva (Marathi) ===
1. "Ha Asa Saanjgaarva"
2. "Bhet Maajhi Tujhi"
3. "Kadhi Saanjveli"
4. "Eke Diwashi Sandhyakali"
5. "Aathvanichya Phulani Jase"
6. "Paaus Daatalela"
7. "Dis Nakalat Jaai"

=== Yeh Hai Prem – 1998 (Hindi) ===
Yeh Hai Prem is a 1998 Hindi debut album, released in April 1998 by Rajashri Music in collaboration with Sony Music. It was first Indian album to be released in Enhanced CD format which integrated both audio tracks and a data section. The album features one music video, along with some additional software installations, among other content.

Singer & Music Director – Milind M. Ingle
Lyrics – Shyam Anuragi
Supporting Singer – Shikha
Featuring – Abbas & Preeti Jhangiani
Video Director – Kunal Kohli
Video Producer – Rajat Bharjatiya

Track list
1. "Chhuimui Si Tum Lagti Ho"
2. "Yeh Hai Prem"
3. "Kudi Jach Gayi"
4. "Kabse Tera Hai Intezaar"
5. "Meri Juliet Meri Sahiba"
6. "Rimjhim Barso Megh"
7. "Tu Ru Ru"
8. "Main Tumhe Chaha Karun"
9. "You Are The One"
10. "O Priya"
11. "Video of Chhuimui" (Music video)
