= Priya Bapat =

Indian film and television actress (born 1986)

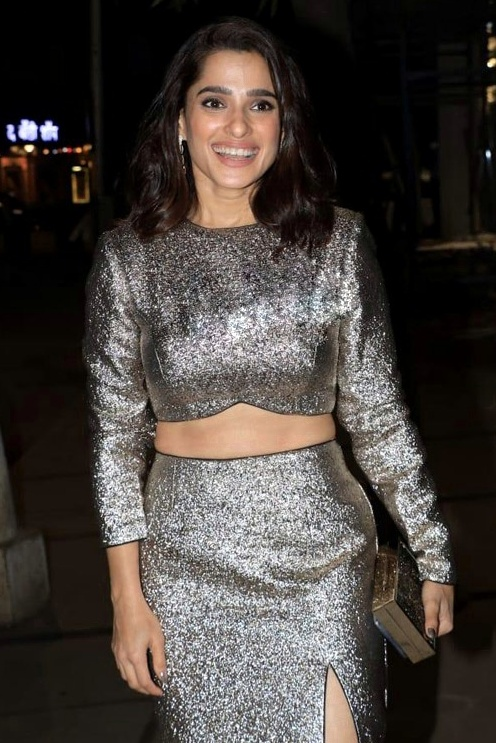
- Born: 18 September 1986 (age 40); Mumbai, Maharashtra, India
- Education: Ramnarain Ruia College Sophia Polytechnic
- Occupation: Actress
- Years active: 2000–present
- Spouse: Umesh Kamat (m. 2011)

Priya Bapat (born 18 September 1986) is an Indian actress who works in Marathi and Hindi films, television, theatre and web series. Known for her versatility across genres, she has received several accolades including two Maharashtra State Film Awards and a Zee Chitra Gaurav Puraskar, in addition to multiple nominations at Filmfare Marathi and other ceremonies.

Bapat began her career as child artist with television dramas and the films such as Dr. Babasaheb Ambedkar (2000) and Munna Bhai M.B.B.S. (2003), before gaining prominence with the Marathi blockbuster Mi Shivajiraje Bhosale Boltoy! (2009). Bapat established herself with acclaimed performances in the period drama Kaksparsh (2012), the drama Happy Journey (2014), the slice of life Vazandar (2016), the phycological drama Pimpal (2017), and the feminist drama Aamhi Doghi (2018).

Beyond films, Bapat has been active in theatre with plays like Nava Gadi Nava Rajya and Jar Tar Chi Goshta, and has found success in digital media her portrayal of Poornima Gaikwad in City of Dreams (2019–2023), which won her several awards and emerged as a defining role. She has also appeared in Hindi films including Chakki (2022), Visfot (2024) and Costao (2025).

In addition to acting, Bapat has engaged in entrepreneurial ventures, co-founding a clothing label with her sister. She married actor Umesh Kamat in 2011, with whom she frequently collaborates on stage and screen.

== Early life and education ==
Priya Bapat was born on 18 September 1986 in Mumbai, Maharashtra, to Sharad and Smita Bapat. She was raised in Dadar, where she spent her childhood in a chawl on Ranade Road.

Bapat studied at Balmohan Vidyamandir, where she developed a keen interest in the performing arts and regularly participated in plays, dramas, and talent competitions. She received training in classical music under Shubhada Dadarkar for two years, with a focus on devotional songs and later trained under vocalist Uttara Kelkar, though she eventually discontinued due to vocal cord issues. After finishing school, Bapat pursued a Bachelor of Arts degree in Economics and subsequently earned a Bachelor’s degree in Mass Communication from Ramnarain Ruia College, Matunga. During her time in college, she also completed a short course in filmmaking.

== Career ==
=== Child artist and early recognition (2000–2010) ===
Priya Bapat stepped into acting as a child artist, appearing in the acclaimed Marathi television shows Damini (2000), Bandini (2000), De Dhamal (2001), and in the theatre production Vatevaratee Kaachaa Ga. Her film debut came the same year with Jabbar Patel’s National Award-winning biographical drama Dr. Babasaheb Ambedkar (2000), where she played young Ramabai Ambedkar.

She next featured as a child actor in Chandrakant Kulkarni’s Bhet (2002). Bapat later grabbed attention in Bollywood through brief but notable appearances in Rajkumar Hirani’s Munna Bhai M.B.B.S. (2003) and its sequel Lage Raho Munna Bhai (2006), both starring Sanjay Dutt. Recalling her audition, she once said, "I went to Hirani's office. I auditioned and I got the part. It was that simple." Between 2004 and 2006, she made a mark on television with Adhuri Ek Kahani, playing a spirited role opposite established actors like Swapnil Joshi, Kishori Godbole and Neena Kulkarni. Her energy on screen was widely appreciated.

Her transition into lead roles began in 2009 with Mi Shivajiraje Bhosale Boltoy!, a story highlighting an underdog’s struggle against social ills. Playing an aspiring actress struggling against stereotypes about Marathi women, she starred opposite Sachin Khedekar, Suchitra Bandekar and Mahesh Manjrekar. The film struck huge at the box office, collecting ₹25 crore worldwide to emerge as the highest grossing Marathi film of that time. For this, she earned a V. Shantaram Annual Film Award nomination for Best Debut Artiste in a Leading Role. In 2010, she appeared in Zee Marathi’s Shubham Karoti, which explored the complexities of a joint family, She simultaneously took on roles in films such as Anandi Anand and Aika Dajiba alongside veterans like Vikram Gokhale, Ashok Saraf, Suhas Joshi, Mohan Joshi and Vandana Gupte.

=== Breakthrough and acclaimed performances (2011–2018) ===
Bapat transitioned back to theatre, starring opposite Umesh Kamat in Nava Gadi Nava Rajya in the 2011, a stage play later adapted into Gujarati and Konkani. The story of a newlywed couple’s emotional journey resonated with audiences, and critics admired the duo’s chemistry. Ambarish Ganesh of Indian Nerve wrote that “Bapat as the childlike Amruta steals hearts”.

A turning point came with her performance as Uma, a young widow, in Mahesh Manjrekar’s Kaksparsh (2012). Set in the 1930s Konkan and based on Usha Datar’s short story, the film explored a Chitpavan Brahmin family’s turbulent fate. The film won widespread acclaim and ran for over 100 days in theatres, collecting ₹14 crore at the box office. making it the top-grossing Marathi film of the year. It is now regarded as a milestone in Marathi cinema. Critics praised her portrayal, with The Times of India noting, "Priya Bapat who played ‘Older Uma’ has more responsibility on her shoulder but she has fulfilled the challenge with her great acting skills," while critic Keyur Seta called her performance “terrific”, adding, "The scenes where she depicts pain and tragedy prove her talent." The role won her the Maharashtra State Film Award for Best Actress and the Zee Chitra Gaurav Puraskar for Best Actress, besides a nomination at the MFK Award for Favourite Actress.

Her 2013 releases included the comedy Aandhali Koshimbir, where critics remarked that she served mostly as the glamour quotient, and Time Please, Sameer Vidwans’ film adaptation of Nava Gadi Nava Rajya, again with Kamat, Siddharth Jadhav and Sai Tamhankar. Critics commented on her dynamic character arc, with Aparna Phadke noting, "She brings about the contrast... When she has to crack emotionally she does so with sadness that reflects in her eyes." The role brought her another nomination at Maharashtracha Favourite Kon. She followed it with Sachin Kundalkar’s drama Happy Journey (2014), co-starring Atul Kulkarni, where she played a ghost reconnecting with her estranged brother. The film grossed ₹4 crore and won her a second Maharashtra State Film Award. For her portrayal, Keyur Seta called her a “scene-stealer”, remarking, "You just can’t stop adoring her due to the manner in which she gets her act right."

In 2015, she featured in Ravi Jadhav’s romantic Timepass 2, opposite Priyadarshan Jadhav, playing the grown-up Prajakta Lele (Praju), the sequel to the 2014 film of the same name. While the film drew mixed reviews, it collected ₹31 crore and ended up the third highest-grossing Marathi film of the year. She also appeared in Lokmanya: Ek Yugpurush the same year, another box-office success.

The following year, she reunited with Sai Tamhankar and Sachin Kundalkar for comedy Vazandar (2016), where both actors gained weight to portray two friends struggling with body image. Bapat not only acted but also lent her voice to two songs. The film’s subject gave it wide attention, including screenings across India and the United States Critics praised her dedication, Mihir Bhanage of The Times of India noted, "Sai and Priya’s physical transformation shows their dedication to the job and their performances speak a thousand words," However, Maharashtra Times critic Rituja Joshi argued that the characters did not appear as overweight as the title suggested. The film earned her a Filmfare Marathi nomination despite only moderate box-office results.

She next collaborated with Gajendra Ahire in the festival-acclaimed Pimpal, opposite Dilip Prabhavalkar, playing a compassionate doctor. The film won honours at the Kolhapur International Film Festival, Pune International Film Festival and Bengaluru International Film Festival. She followed it with Gachchi, a situational comedy. Ullas Shirke wrote, "Bapat has played the lead role of Keerti very convincingly to display her disturbed state of mind." and which earned her another Filmfare nomination. In Pratima Joshi’s family drama Aamhi Doghi (2018), adapted from Gauri Deshpande’s short story Paus Ala Motha, Bapat portrayed a rebellious young woman scarred by emotional neglect. Starring alongside Mukta Barve, she received acclaim, with Film Companion’s Sumedh Natu calling it "arguably her best performance till date,” though questioning Joshi’s choice to cast her as a schoolgirl: “She doesn’t look sixteen.” The film was also screened at International Film Festival of India (IFFI) 2018 under Indian Panorama.

=== Digital success and recent work (2019–Present) ===
Her digital debut came as Poornima Gaikwad, an sharp politician in the political drama City of Dreams (2019), directed by Nagesh Kukunoor. Though the show divided critics, Bapat’s performance stood out, with Rohit Bhatnagar of The Free Press Journal writing, "Bapat steals the show. She very well emotes her depression, breakdowns and return to her political podium as CM." City of Dreams spawned two more seasons and brought Priya multiple awards.

Back in Hindi films, she acted in 2022 comedy drama Chakki, playing the fiancée of an ordinary man battling corruption. While the film failed commercially, critics appreciated her presence. Sameer Ahire of Movie Talkies wrote, "Bapat looks gorgeous as his girlfriend, and she also has a couple of scenes to show her acting talent." Later, she reunited with Umesh Kamat for the web series Aani Kay Hava (2019), a light-hearted take on married life’s “firsts” and the play Jar Tar Chi Goshta, which marked her return to theatre after a decade. The play completed over 100 shows, and Mumbai Theatre Guide noted, "Her character brings most of the emotion to the storyline," adding, "She sings a beautiful song and for a moment, you can feel the breeze blowing through Bapat's long silky hair." At the Zee Natya Gaurav Awards, she earned a Best Actress nomination and, with Kamat, the Best Couple award. Around the same period, she was also seen as a lawyer in the legal drama Rafuchakkar, where her role was described as "impressive".

2024 expanded her Hindi film repertoire with Visfot, a crime thriller where she depicted the role of a pilot’s wife (played by Riteish Deshmukh) entangled in an affair. Released on JioCinema, the film was received positively. Devesh Sharma of Filmfare wrote, "Bapat's portrayal of Tara effectively conveys the tragedy of a conflicted relationship... Priya brings all these layers into her performance with aplomb." She also starred in two series that year, Zindaginama and Raat Jawaan Hai.

Her next Hindi OTT release was Costao, a 2025 biographical crime drama based on Goa customs officer Costao Fernandes. Playing his wife Maria opposite Nawazuddin Siddiqui, Bapat earned praise from The Indian Express' Shubhra Gupta wrote, "Bapat, playing Costao’s wife Maria, comes up with a full-blooded performance, keeping in step with Siddiqui." She played a cop in the supernatural horror series Andhera, which received mixed response. After a seven-year hiatus, Bapat returned to Marathi cinema with Bin Lagnachi Goshta, a comedy-drama centered on live-in relationships and an unexpected pregnancy, where she starred alongside Girish Oak, Nivedita Joshi and Umesh Kamat. She also appeared in the mystery thriller Asambhav, that earned her the MaTa Sanman Award for Best Supporting Actress.

== Personal life ==
She has an elder sister, Shweta Bapat, a costume designer.

Bapat first met actor Umesh Kamat while she was in the 10th grade, at the premiere of Bhet (2002), but it was on the last day of shooting for the Marathi television series Aabhalmaya that the two exchanged numbers, which initiated their relationship. After dating for nearly eight years, Bapat married Kamat on 5 October 2011 in a traditional Marathi wedding ceremony.

Their personal life has frequently drawn media attention, particularly regarding their decision not to have children. Addressing societal expectations, Bapat has questioned the notion that life is considered complete only through "marital bliss" and parenthood. She has emphasized that "having a child is entirely a personal decision" to be made by her, her husband, and their family.

== Other works ==
In 2019, Bapat co-founded the saree label Sawenchi with her sister Shweta, a fashion designer.

Bapat is the brand ambassador for Fastest Health, India’s first on-demand quick service diagnostics platform. She has also been part of campaigns for Ching’s and P. N. Gadgil Jewellers. On the occasion of Gudi Padwa 2026, she endorsed the launch of Tanishq’s Dor mangalsutra collection.

== Filmography ==
=== Films ===
Year	Title	Role	Language	Notes	Ref.
2000	Dr. Babasaheb Ambedkar	Young Ramabai Ambedkar	English	Child artist	
2002	Bhet		Marathi	Child artist	
2003	Munna Bhai M.B.B.S	Meenal	Hindi		
2006	Lage Raho Munna Bhai	Priya	Hindi	Cameo appearance	
2009	Mi Shivajiraje Bhosale Boltoy!	Shashikala Bhosale	Marathi	Lead debut	
2010	Anandi Anand	Anandi	Marathi		
2010	Aika Dajiba	Netra	Marathi		
2012	Kaksparsh	Uma Damle	Marathi		
2013	Aandhali Koshimbir	Manju	Marathi		
2013	Time Please	Amruta Sane Deshpande	Marathi		
2014	Happy Journey	Janaki	Marathi		
2015	Lokmanya: Ek Yugpurush	Sameera	Marathi		
2015	Timepass 2	Prajakta Lele	Marathi		
2016	Vazandar	Pooja	Marathi	Also playback singer	
2017	Pimpal	Meghna	Marathi		
2017	Gachchi	Keerti Sharda	Marathi	Also playback singer	
2018	Gulabjaam	-	Marathi	Cameo appearance	
2018	Aamhi Doghi	Savitri (Savi)	Marathi		
2018	Nava Phool	Priya	Marathi	Short film	
2019	Zehn	Sanaa	Hindi	Short film	
2022	Timepass 3	Prajakta Lele	Marathi	Cameo appearance, in flashback scenes	
2022	Chakki	Reema	Hindi		
2024	Visfot	Tara	Hindi	Released on JioCinema	
2025	Costao	Maria Fernandes	Hindi	Released on ZEE5	
2025	Bin Lagnachi Goshta	Ritika	Marathi		
2025	Asambhav	Sadhana Sehgal	Marathi		
2026	Dalimb		Hindi	ZEE5	

=== Theater ===
Year	Title	Role	Language	Notes	Ref.
2000	Vatevaratee Kaachaa Ga		Marathi / Hindi		
2011	Nava Gadi Nava Rajya	Amruta	Marathi		
2023	Jar Tar Chi Goshta	Radha	Marathi	Also presented and playback singer	
2026	Aamchya Pidhichi Goshtach Vegali		Marathi	Presented	

=== Television ===
Year	Title	Role	Language	Channel	Notes
2000	Damini		Marathi	ETV Marathi	Child artist
2000	Bandini		Marathi	Mi Marathi	Child artist
2001	De Dhamal	Rituja	Marathi	Alpha TV Marathi	Child artist
2001	Kids World	Anchor	Marathi	Alpha TV Marathi	Child artist
2002	Aabhalmaya		Marathi	Alpha TV Marathi	Child artist
2002	Alpha Features	Anchor	Marathi	Alpha TV Marathi	Child artist
2004–2006	Adhuri Ek Kahani	Arpita Deodhar	Marathi	Zee Marathi	
2007	Specials @ 10	Anjali	Hindi	Sony TV	Segment: "Har Kadam Par Shaque"
2009	Vicky Ki Taxi		Hindi	Real Channel	Episodic role
2009	Good Morning Maharashtra	Anchor	Marathi	Zee Marathi	
2010	Shubham Karoti	Kimaya	Marathi	Zee Marathi	
2011	Sa Re Ga Ma Pa	Anchor	Marathi	Zee Marathi	Season 7
2011	Dadasaheb Phalke		Marathi	ETV Marathi	Documentary
2014	Aamhi Travelkar	Anchor	Marathi	Zee Marathi	

=== Web series ===
Year	Title	Roles	Language	Network	Notes	Ref.
2019–present	City of Dreams	Poornima Gaikwad	Hindi	Hotstar		
2019–present	Aani Kay Hava	Jui	Marathi	MX Player		
2023	Rafuchakkar	Ritu Bhandari	Hindi	JioCinema		
2024	Zindaginama	Vaidehi	Hindi	SonyLIV	Segment: "Banwar"	
2024	Raat Jawaan Hai	Suman	Hindi	SonyLIV		
2025	Andhera	Inspector Kalpana Kadam	Hindi	Prime Video		
2026	Hey Kay Navin?	Rama	Marathi	ZEE5		

== Accolades ==
Year	Awards	Category	Work	Result
2009	V. Shantaram Annual Film Award	Best Debut Artiste in a Leading Role	Mi Shivajiraje Bhosale Boltoy!	Nominated
2010	Maharashtracha Favourite Kon	Popular Face of the Year	—N/a	Nominated
2012	Zee Chitra Gaurav Awards	Best Actress	Kaksparsh	Won
2012	Screen Awards Marathi	Best Actress	Kaksparsh	Won
2012	Maharashtra State Film Awards	Best Actress	Kaksparsh	Won
2012	Maharashtracha Favourite Kon	Favourite Actress	Kaksparsh	Nominated
2013	Maharashtracha Favourite Kon	Favourite Actress	Time Please	Nominated
2014	Filmfare Awards Marathi	Best Actress	Happy Journey	Nominated
2014	Maharashtra State Film Awards	Best Actress	Happy Journey	Won
2015	Zee Chitra Gaurav Awards	Best Actress	Happy Journey	Nominated
2015	Zee Talkies Comedy Awards	Best Actress	Aandhali Koshimbir	Nominated
2015	Maharashtracha Favourite Kon	Popular Face of the Year	—N/a	Won
2015	Maharashtracha Favourite Kon	Favourite Actress	Happy Journey	Nominated
2015	Maharashtracha Favourite Kon	Favourite Actress	Timepass 2	Nominated
2016	Zee Chitra Gaurav Awards	Best Actress	Timepass 2	Nominated
2016	Filmfare Awards Marathi	Best Actress	Vazandar	Nominated
2017	Filmfare Awards Marathi	Best Actress	Gachchi	Nominated
2018	Zee Chitra Gaurav Awards	Best Actress	Gachchi	Nominated
2019	Zee Chitra Gaurav Awards	Best Actress	Aamhi Doghi	Nominated
2020	e4m Play Streaming Media Awards	Best Actress in a Leading Role	City of Dreams	Won
2021	Maharashtracha Favourite Kon	Popular Face of the Year	—N/a	Nominated
2023	The Times of India Film Awards (TOIFA)	Best Female Actor in a Web Series	City of Dreams 3	Nominated
2024	Zee Natya Gaurav Awards	Best Actress	Jar Tar Chi Goshta	Nominated
2024	Zee Natya Gaurav Awards	Best Anuroop Jodi	Jar Tar Chi Goshta	Won
2024	International Iconic Awards Marathi	Best Actress (Theatre)	Jar Tar Chi Goshta	Won
2025	Critics’ Choice Awards	Best Supporting Actress (Web Series)	Raat Jawaan Hai	Nominated
2025	e4m Play Streaming Media Awards	Best Actor in a Comic Role ( Female ) Web series	Raat Jawaan Hai	Won
2026	Maharashtra Times Sanman	Best Supporting Actress	Asambhav	Won
2026	City Cine Awards Marathi	Best Supporting Actor – Female	Asambhav	Pending
