= Aamhi Doghi =

- Aamhi Doghi Poster
- Aamhi Doghi
- Directed by: Pratima Joshi
- Screenplay by: Pratima Joshi & Bhagyashree Jadhav
- Based on: Paus Ala Motha by the late Gauri Deshpande
- Produced by: Puja Chhabria
- Starring: Mukta Barve; Priya Bapat; Bhushan Pradhan
- Cinematography: Milind Jog
- Edited by: Jayant Jathar
- Music by: Mangesh Dhakade
- Production company: White Swan Studios
- Distributed by: Everest Entertainment
- Release date: 23 February 2018 (India)
- Country: India
- Language: Marathi

Aamhi Doghi (transl. The both of us) is a Marathi-language feminist drama film starring Mukta Barve and Priya Bapat, directed by Pratima Joshi and produced by Puja Chhabria. It is an adaptation of the short story Paus Ala Motha by the late author Gauri Deshpande.

== Plot ==
Savitri (Priya Bapat) lives in Kolhapur with her father Jagdish Sardesai (Kiran Karmarkar), a well-known lawyer. Jagdish is an emotionally unavailable, distant and cold man, who believes in practical and rational behavior. He is also an authoritarian father. In the absence of a mother and a busy father, Savitri (Savi) is brought up largely by servants and staff of the large house in which they live. Despite refusing to remarry after the death of his wife (Savi's mother), Jagdish brings home a new bride Amla (Mukta Barve) from one of his work trips, when Savi is 15 years old, without consulting or informing her. Although she is upset about this, she eventually develops curiosity and also begins a genial friendship with Amla, who she calls 'Ammi'.

While Savi and Ammi are very different (Ammi is illiterate whereas Saavi is a school-topper, Saavi is hot-headed and stubborn while Ammi is quiet and patient) they both bond and look forward to each other's company. Ammi also tries to bring emotional depth to the cold and distant relationship between father and daughter. However, things between the two come to a head and Savi leaves home to pursue higher studies in Mumbai.

While in Mumbai, Savi completes her Masters, topping the university and gets a fellowship at a research institute of her choice. She also befriends Ram (Bhushan Pradhan) who is enamoured by her outspoken honesty, practicality and straightforwardness. Soon, Savi moves into a rented apartment and begins a relationship with Ram. Despite her father's calls, she does not go back to Kolhapur. One day, as she is leaving to attend an office party thrown for her by her boss, Ammi shows up at her door. She informs Savi that her father died 15 days ago but did not want to inform her. She shows Savi his will, wherein he leaves his entire property to Saavi, on the condition that she allow Ammi to live with her as her mother. Savi is initially angry at her father's actions, but lets Ammi stay with her. Saavi and Ammi once again come close and bond with each other, with Savi even introducing Ammi as her 'mother' instead of 'stepmother', like she would earlier.

In the meanwhile, Ram and Savi start having relationship trouble as Ram is pressured into marrying by his family. He wants to marry Savi, but Savi doesn't believe in the institution of marriage. After an argument, Ram leaves for Nagpur, his family home, for an office project. He tells Savi he doesn't know when he will return. A few weeks later, Savi finds out from mutual friends that Ram has married an old family friend. Savi is upset but doesn't show it, focusing instead on why Ram would choose to marry such an ordinary girl. At this time, Ammi consoles her, telling her she should be happy that Savi and Ram only knew love in their relationship, and not the 'practicalities' of marriage that Savi detested.

As Savi gets back to normal, she comes home to find Ammi shivering in bed. Ammi faints and Savi takes her to the hospital, where she finds that Ammi is in the last stage of leukemia. She is further shocked when the doctor tells her Ammi has known about this all along. Ammi then tells her that their fathers were classmates. Savi's father knew of Ammi's sickness when they married. Ammi came from a very poor family and had nothing. Once when Savi's father came to visit them in Belgaum, Ammi had just lost her father, and had no one else, nor any money. Taking pity on her, and with the assumption that she would make a good companion for Savi, her father married Ammi, however they never had any sexual relations. She tells Savi her father cared for her very well, arranging for medicines, doctors and more whenever necessary.

As she breathes her last, she tells Savi not to bottle up her feelings, to set them free, just as she believes in freedom in relationships. When Ammi dies, Savi finally cries for the first time in her life. Savi sells her childhood home in Kolhapur, choosing to only keep the things that remind her of Ammi and open herself up to others, just as she did with Ammi.

== Cast ==
- Mukta Barve as Amla aka Ammi
- Priya Bapat as Savitri aka Savi
- Bhushan Pradhan as Ram
- Aarti Wadagbalkar as Neha
- Kiran Karmarkar as Adv Jagdish Sardesai

== Production ==
Mukta Barve and Priya Bapat were signed for playing lead roles in November 2017. The film was directed by Pratima Joshi and produced by Puja Chhabria under the banner of White Swan Studios.

The film is the second time the actors Mukta Barve and Priya Bapat have collaborated, after the 2010 film Aika Dajiba.
