= Gauri Deshpande =

Marathi writer (1942–2003)

Dr. Gauri Deshpande
- Born: 11 February 1942; Pune, Bombay Presidency, British India
- Died: 1 March 2003 (aged 60); Pune, Maharashtra, India
- Education: M.A., PhD
- Occupations: Writer, Poet

Gauri Deshpande (11 February 1942 – 1 March 2003) was a novelist, short story writer, and poet from Maharashtra, India. She wrote in Marathi and English.

== Biography ==
Deshpande was born in Pune to Irawati and Dinkar Dhondo Karve, youngest of three children. She is also the granddaughter of the social reformer Maharshi Dhondo Keshav Karve.

Her daughter Urmila Deshpande is also an author and published the novels Kashmir Blues, A Pack of Lies, and Equal to Angels; the short story collection, Slither: Carnal Prose, and edited Madhouse: True stories of the Inmates of Hostel 4.

=== Education ===
Deshpande finished her high school education at Ahilyadevi School in Pune. She then attended Fergusson College to receive an M.A in English Literature. She eventually received her PhD in English from Pune University.

=== Professional life ===
Deshpande taught at the Department of English at Fergusson College and later as a professor at the department of English at the then University of Pune.

=== Death ===
Deshpande died in Pune on 1 March 2003 due to complications arising as a result of alcohol abuse. She is survived by two daughters from her first husband, one daughter from her second husband, three grandsons and a granddaughter.

== Works ==
Deshpande wrote in Marathi and English. Her works include fiction, non-fiction, short stories, articles and translations.

=== Marathi works ===
- Paus Ala Motha (1973)
- Ekek Pan Galawaya (1985) (fiction) ISBN 978-8174868510
  - translated to Gujarati as Ekek aa khare pandadun in 1989 by Jayantilal Mehta
- Teruo Te Ani Kahi Door Paryant (1985) (fiction) ISBN 978-8174868664
- Ahe He Ase Ahe (1986) ASIN B07H57L8RR
- Niragathi Ani Chandrike Ga Sarike Ga (1987) (fiction) ASIN B07NVXCTS6
- Dustar Ha Ghat Ani Thang (1989)(Marathi fiction) ISBN 978-8174867681
- Mukkam (1992) (fiction) ISBN 978-8174867445
- Vinchurniche Dhade (1996)(fiction) ASIN B00P97H35O
- Goph (1999) (fiction) ISBN 978-8174867605
- Utkhanan (2002) (fiction) ISBN 9788184989540
- She also translated Sir Richard Burton's ten-volume English edition of the "Arabian Nights" from English to Marathi. The volumes were published in 1976-77.

=== English works ===
- "Between Births" (1968)
- Lost love (1970)
- The Murder (Article)
- Beyond the Slaughterhouse (1972) (poems)
- The position of women in India (1973) (Pamphlet)
- An anthology of Indo-English poetry (1974)
- Small is beautiful (Article)
- That's the way it is (1982)(Article published in Journal of South Asian literature) ISBN 9780226256092
- Collected Plays of Satish Alekar (1989) co-editor. Within the book, the story The Dread Departure was the english translation of the 1974 Marathi play Mahanirvan by Satish Alekar
- Right on, Sister! (1995) (Article co-authored with Vidyut Aklujkar published in Journal of South Asian literature)
- --and Pine for What Is Not (1995) (translation of Sunita Deshpande's Ahe Manohar Tari...) ISBN 9780863115790
- The Lackadaisical Sweeper (1997) (short story collection) ISBN 9788186852040
- Diary of a decade of agony (translation of Avinash Dharmadhikari's Aswastha dashakachi diary) ISBN 9780863116285
- The female of the Species (a short poem) ISBN 9780062320896

== Influence ==
- In 1989, her book Ekek Pan Galawaya was translated to Gujarati as Ekek aa khare pandadun by Jayantilal Mehta
- In 2010, her book Niragathi Ani Chandrike Ga Sarike Ga was translated to English as Deliverance: a Novella by Shashi Deshpande
- In 2018, her book Paus Ala Motha was adapted into the Marathi film Aamhi Doghi.
