= Slam Book (film) =

- Official poster
- Directed by: Ruturaj Dhalgade
- Story by: Ruturaj Dhalgade
- Produced by: Ruturaj D Productions
- Starring: Shantanu Rangnekar; Ritika Shroti; Dilip Prabhavalkar; Kushal Badrike; Usha Nadkarni; Mrunmayee Deshpande; Siddharth Menon; Mangesh Desai; Supriya Pathare; Yogesh Sirsat
- Cinematography: Anand Pande
- Edited by: Rohit Mhatre
- Music by: Shubhankar
- Release date: August 21, 2015
- Country: India
- Language: Marathi

Slam Book is a 2015 Marathi language drama film which is produced by Ruturaj D Film Productions and directed by Ruturaj Dhalgade. The screenplay by Ruturaj Dhalgade centres on a teenage love story.

== Cast ==
- Shantanu Rangnekar - Hruday
- Ritika Shroti - Aparna
- Dilip Prabhavalkar - Krishna kant Aajoba
- Kushal Badrike - Vishnu
- Usha Nadkarni - Sumi Aaji
- Mrunmayee Deshpande - Grown up Aparna
- Siddharth Menon - Grown up Hruday
- Mangesh Desai - Mama
- Yash Abbad - Friend
- Supriya Pathare
- Yogesh Sirsat
- Kanchi Shinde - Meera
- Ketki Gokhle - Urvashi
