= Umesh Kamat =

Indian actor (born 1978)

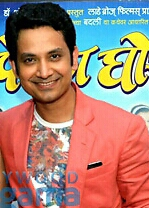
- Born: 12 December 1978 (age 47); Mumbai, Maharashtra, India
- Occupation: Actor
- Spouse: Priya Bapat (m. 2011)

Umesh Kamat (born 12 December 1978) is an Indian actor and model, who predominantly works in Marathi-language regional films, television series, plays and TV commercials. Kamat has been a recipient of Maharashtra State Film Awards for the film Samar - Ek Sangharsh.

He has worked in a series of daily soaps recently, making him a star actor of Marathi television. Some of his memorable roles are Adinath Shastri from Asambhav, Nishad from Shubham Karoti. But, the most popular role of his was that of Adv. Om Chaudhari in Eka Lagnachi Tisri Goshta, aired in 2013, in which he was paired with Spruha Joshi. His recent film was Mumbai Time, which was released in February 2016.

== Personal life ==
Kamat married Priya Bapat in 2011.

== Media image ==
Most Desirable Men of Maharashtra
Sponsor	Year	Rank	
		Film	Ref.
The Times of India (Maharashtra Times)	2017	3	
The Times of India (Maharashtra Times)	2018	14	

== Filmography ==
=== Films ===
Year	Film name	Role	Ref.
2005	Kaydyacha Bola	Abhijit Vaidya	
2007	Samar – Ek Sangharsha	Samar	
2008	Tandala	Keshav	
2008	Patla Tar Ghya	Riteish	
2010	Ajab Lagnachi Gajab Goshta	Rajeeev Phansalkar	
2010	Mani Mangalsutra	Shantanu	
2012	Thodi Khatti Thodi Hatti	Mihir Kamat	
2012	Dhaagedore	Prasad Karnik	
2013	Lek Ladki		
2013	Parees	Ramchandra Dhaigude	
2013	Time Please	Hrishikesh Deshpande	
2013	My Dear Yash	Anshuman Karnik	
2013	Lagna Pahave Karun	Nishant Barve	
2014	Pune Via Bihar	Abhijeet Bhosle	
2015	Balkadu	Balkrishna Patil	
2015	A Paying Ghost	Madhav Mategaonkar	
2016	Mumbai Time	Amar Bhargav Surve	
2018	Ye Re Ye Re Paisa	Aditya	
2018	Asehi Ekada Vhave	Siddharth Vaidya	
2019	Smile Please	Cameo appearance	
2020	Dhurala	Atul (Cameo)	
2024	Alibaba Aani Chalishitale Chor	Abhishek	
2024	MyLek	Vaibhav	
2025	Ye Re Ye Re Paisa 3	Aditya	
2025	Taath Kana		
2025	Bin Lagnachi Goshta	Ashay	

=== Theatre ===
Year	Play Name	Role	Ref.
1988	Sonchafa	Sonchafa	
1989	Swami	Narayanrao Peshwe	
1998	And They Lived Happily Ever After		
1999	ArthNirarth		
2001	Ranangan	Jankoji Shinde	
2002	Investment	Rohit	
2009	Man Udhan Varyache	Mayuresh	
2010	Nava Gadi Nava Rajya	Hrishikesh Deshpande	
2013	Gandhi Aadva Yeto	Lalya	
2015	Don't Worry Be Happy	Akshay	
2018	Dada Ek Good News Aahe	Vineet	
2023	Jar Tar Chi Goshta	Samar	

=== Television ===
Year	Show	Role	Ref.
2002	Aabhalmaya	Bunty	
2003	Runanubandh	Keshav	
2004	Padgham	Anchor	
2004	Vadalvaat	Soham	
2005	Sasu Soon Aflatoon	Anchor	
2006	Hya Gojirvanya Gharat	Sahil	
2007-09	Asambhav	Adinath Shastri	
2010	Shubham Karoti	Nishad	
2011	Madhu Ethe An Chandra Tithe	Bhaskar	
2012	Eka Lagnachi Dusri Goshta	Abir Ranade	
2013-14	Eka Lagnachi Tisri Goshta	Advocate Om Choudhary	
2014	In Sanvidhan serial by Shyam Benegal, acted as H.V.Kamat		
2021-22	Ajunahi Barsaat Aahe	Adiraj Pathak	
2022	Fu Bai Fu	Judge	

=== Web series ===
Year	Show	Role	Platform	Ref.
2019	Aani Kay Hava	Saket	MX Player	
2020	Aani Kay Hava Season 2	Saket	MX Player	
2021	Aani Kay Hava Season 3	Saket	MX Player	
2026	Hey Kay Navin?	Aditya		
