= Rajashree Nagarkar =

Rajashree Nagarkar is a performing artist and award winning film actress from Maharashtra an Indian state. She is a shishya of Babasaheb Mirajkar of Kolhapur. She runs a school: Kalika Kala Kendra for the training of artists in the Lavani-Tamasha art form and a theater at Supa in Ahmednagar district. She belongs to the Kolhati community.

== Awards and achievements ==
- 38th Maharashtra State Film Award for best debut performance as an actress in 2001.
- Sahakar Maharshi Shankarrao Mohite-Patil Lavani Kalavant Puraskar in 2003.
- Mahindra Natraj Puraskar.
- Pandit Jasraj Puraskar.
- Maharashtra Kala Niketan Puraskar.
