= Prahaar (newspaper) =

Marathi language newspaper printed in India

- Owner: Rane Prakashan Pvt Ltd.
- Publisher: Manish Rane
- Editor: Sukrut Khandekar
- Metro chief: Dinesh Kahar
- Language: Marathi
- City: Mumbai, Nashik, Sindhudurg, Ratnagiri
- Country: India
- Website: prahaar.in
- Free online archives: epaper.eprahaar.in

Prahaar (Marathi: प्रहार) is a Marathi language newspaper, printed in India with regional editions in Mumbai, Nashik, Ratnagiri and Sindhudurg. It is owed by Narayan Rane's Rane Prakashan Pvt Ltd., In 2016 its editor was Madhukar Bhave.

== See also ==
- List of Marathi-language newspapers
- List of newspapers in India
