= Siddharth Chandekar =

Indian actor (born 1991)

- Born: 14 June 1991 (age 35); Pune, Maharashtra, India
- Occupation: Actor
- Years active: 2008–present
- Spouse: Mitali Mayekar (m. 2021)
- Parent: Seema Chandekar
- Website: www.facebook.com/siddharth.chandekar

Siddharth Chandekar (born 14 June 1991) is an Indian actor. He is known for his work in Marathi cinema. At the age of 18, he made his debut in Marathi cinema with Avadhoot Gupte's 2010 political drama movie Zenda.

== Career ==
Chandekar started his acting career in 2007 with the Hindi film Hamne Jeena Sikh Liya. However, Siddharth made his debut in Marathi with the popular TV serial Agnihotra, later he appeared in Avadhoot Gupte's ‘Zenda’. Siddharth is best known for his role Ani in the recent blockbuster film Classmates. In 2014 he starred as a lead in Ajay Naik's Baware Prem He opposite Urmila Kanitkar.

He then appeared in Aditya Sarpotdar's 2015 blockbuster movie Classmates. Siddharth was seen opposite debutant Rutuja Shinde in romantic comedy film Online Binline. He subsequently featured in different films like Vazandar co-starring Sai Tamhankar and Priya Bapat to be directed by Sachin Kundalkar, Lost and Found along with Spruha Joshi and Pindadan. Siddharth's next film Lost and Found was released on 29 July 2016. The film produced by Golden Gate Motion Pictures is a love story and has Siddharth Chandekar as the male lead. In 2017 Siddhartha's bus stop movie was released. In 2018, he starred in the film Gulabjamun alongside Sonali Kulkarni which is directed by national award winner director Sachin Kundalkar.

== Personal life ==
Chandekar completed his primary education at S D Katariya High School in his hometown Pune, followed by studies at Sir Parshurambhau College Pune. He uses his mom Seema Chandekar's name as his middle name. He married actress Mitali Mayekar.

== Media image ==
Most Desirable Men of Maharashtra
Sponsor	Year	Rank	
Sponsor	Year	Film	Ref.
The Times of India, Maharashtra Times	2017	2	
The Times of India, Maharashtra Times	2018	2	
The Times of India, Maharashtra Times	2019	18	
The Times of India, Maharashtra Times	2020	11	

He was ranked fourth in The Times of India's Top 15 Most Desirable Men on Marathi Television in 2020.

== Filmography ==
=== Films ===
Key
†	Denotes films that have not yet been released

Year	Title	Role	Notes
2008	Humne Jeena Seekh Liya	Ashwin	Bollywood Debut Hindi film
2010	Zenda	Umesh Jagtap	Debut Marathi film
2011	Balgandharva	Mahadev Abhyankar	
2012	Satrangi Re	Yezdi (Michael Mascarenhas)	
2012	Jai Jai Maharashtra Majha	Rajat	
2013	Sanshaykallol	Siddharth	
2013	Prem Mhanje Prem Mhanje Prem Asta	Himself	Cameo
2013	Lagna Pahave Karun	Rahul Kulkarni	
2014	Dusari Goshta	Prasenjit Shinde	
2014	Baavare Prem He	Neel Rajadhyaksha	
2015	Classmates	Annirudha (Anya)	
2015	Sata Lota Pan Sagla Khota	Virendra	
2015	Online Binline	Sid	
2016	Lost and Found	Manas	
2016	Vazandar	Alok Dixit	
2016	Pindadaan	Ashutosh	
2017	Bus Stop	Vineet	
2018	Gulabjaam	Aditya Naik	
2018	Ranangan	Varad Kulkarni	
2019	Miss U Mister	Varun	
2021	Befaam	Siddharth	
2021	Jhimma	Kabir	
2023	Jhimma 2	Kabir	Nominated Zee Chitra Gaurav Puraskar for Best Supporting Actor
2024	Ole Aale	Aditya Lele	
2024	Sridevi Prasanna	Prasanna	
2025	Fussclass Dabhade	Pappu	
2026	Krantijyoti Vidyalay Marathi Madhyam	Kuldeep Nagavkar	
2026	Maya	Siddharth	
2026	Adkitta	Gautam	
TBA	Congratulations †	TBA	Filming

=== Television ===
- 2019 City of Dreams on Disney+ Hotstar (Webseries)
- 2010 Agnihotra as Neil Agnihotri
- 2011 Kashala Udyachi Baat as Aditya Mahashabde
- 2011 Madhu Ithe An Chandra Tithe - Zee Marathi as Mohan
- 2017 Prem He - Zee Yuva as Shree
- 2019 Jeevlaga - Star Pravah as Nikhil
- 2020-21 Sang Tu Aahes Ka? - Star Pravah as Swaraj
- 2021 Bigg Boss Marathi season 3 - Colors Marathi as Guest
- 2021-2024 Mi Honar Superstar - Star Pravah as Host
- 2025 Mrs. Deshpande – JioHotstar
