= 58th Maharashtra State Film Awards =

Award ceremony for Indian films of 2022

- Awarded for: Best of Marathi cinema in 2020
- Awarded by: Government of Maharashtra
- Announced on: 21 August 2024
- Site: NSCI Dome, Worli, Mumbai
- Hosted by: Girija Oak and Sonali Kulkarni
- Official website: www.filmcitymumbai.org

Highlights
- Best Feature Film: Me Vasantrao
- Most awards: Me Vasantrao (10)

The 58th Maharashtra State Film Awards, presented by the Government of Maharashtra celebrated excellence in Marathi cinema by honoring the best films released in 2020.

The 58th and 59th editions of the awards were held together, with special category honors being presented jointly for both years. The nominations for both ceremonies were announced on 14 August 2024.

Among the winners, Me Vasantrao emerged as the most awarded film, securing 10 awards in total, including Best Film I, Best Director I and Best Actor. It was followed by Baaplyok which won 7 awards, including Best Film II, Best Director II and Best Supporting Actor. Rahul Deshpande achieved a rare feat by winning in all three categories he was nominated for.

== Jury members ==
| • Sharvani Pillai | • Aditi Deshpande |
| • Anil Gavas | • Mahendra Teredesai |
| • Vinayak Pawar | • Milind Ingle |
| • Megha Ghadge | • Manohar Achrekar |
| • Bhakti Mayalu | • Sameer Athalye |
| • Vijay Bhope | • Anita Berde |
| • Sharad Sawant | • Ajit Shirole |
• Mahesh Koli

== Awards and nominations ==
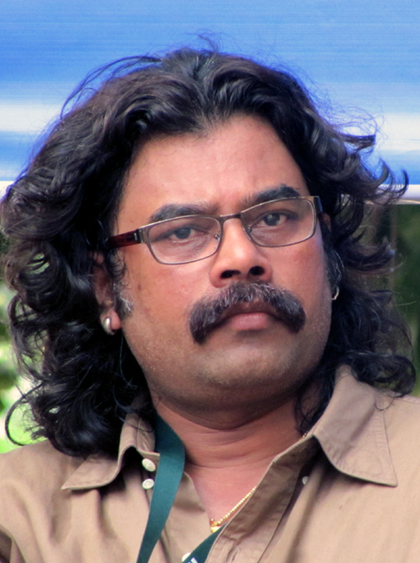
Gajendra Ahire, Best Social Film Director

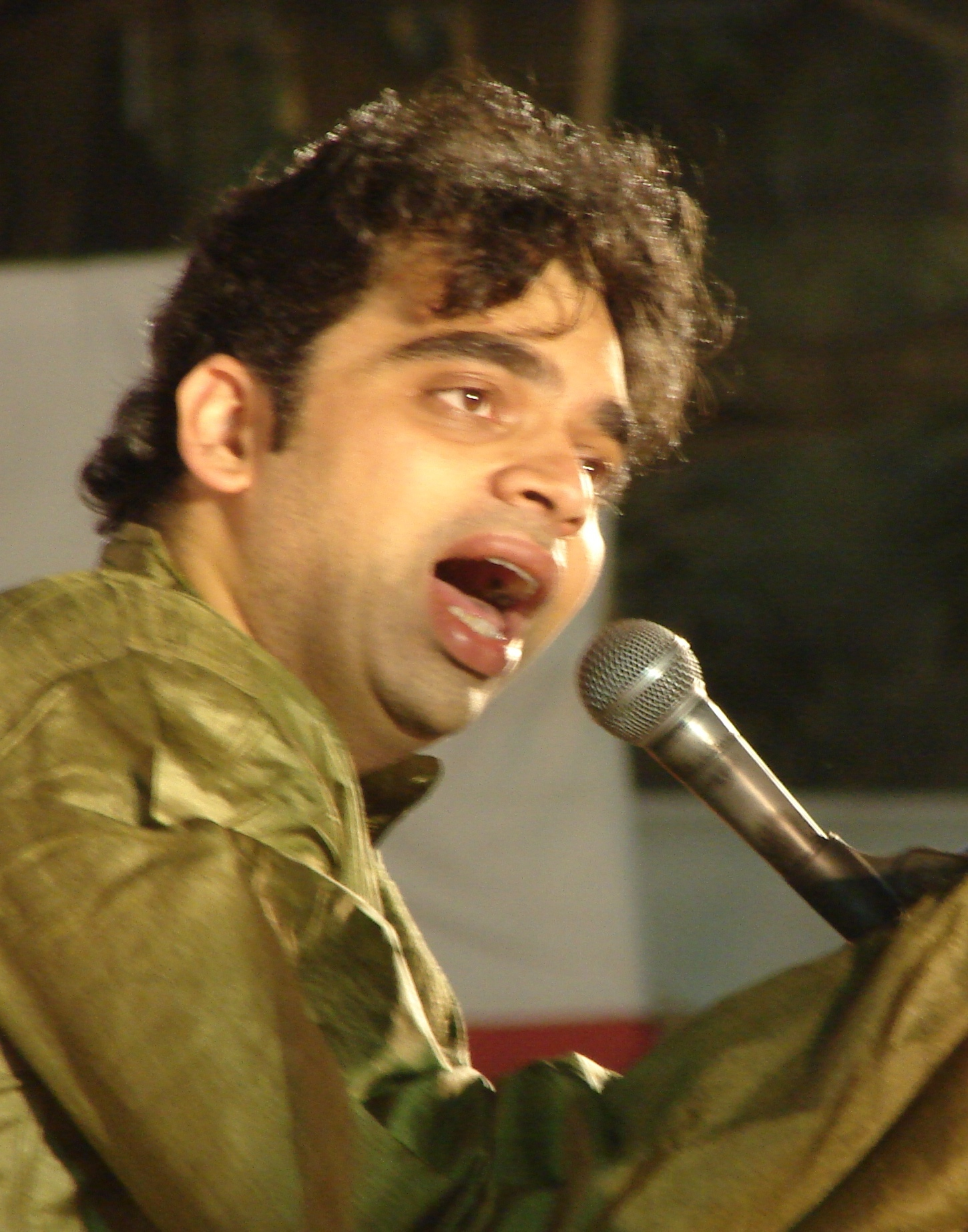
Rahul Deshpande , Best Actor, Best Playback Singer Male and Best Music Director

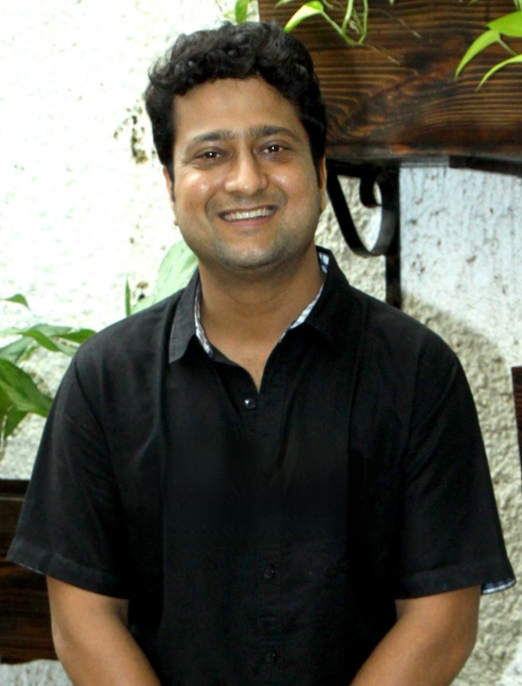
Jitendra Joshi, Best Comedian Male

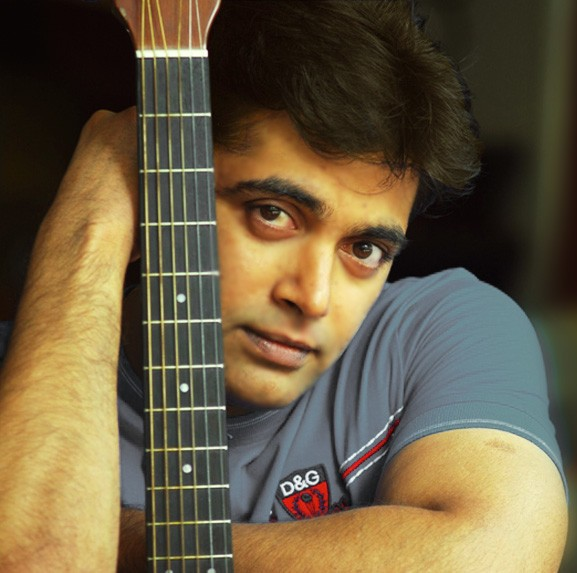
Guru Thakur, Best Lyricist

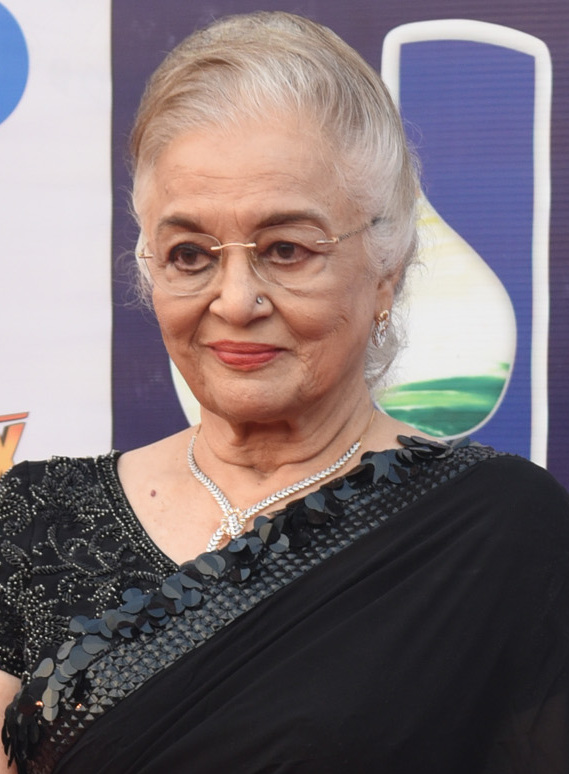
Asha Parekh, Raj Kapoor Award

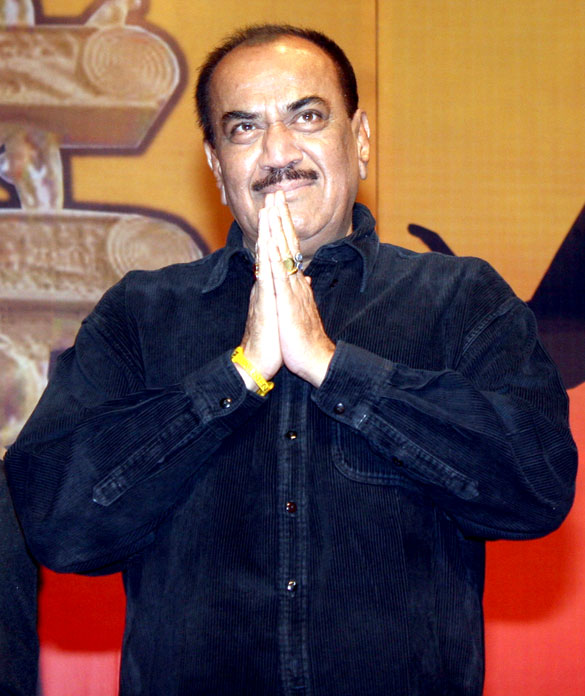
Shivaji Satam, V. Shantaram Lifetime Achievement Award

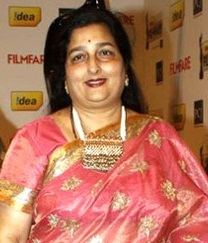
Anuradha Paudwal, Lata Mangeshkar Award

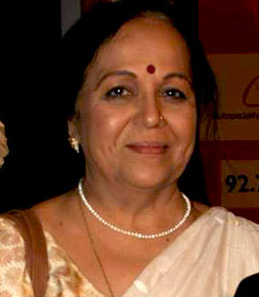
Rohini Hattangadi, Vitthal Smruti Special Contribution Award

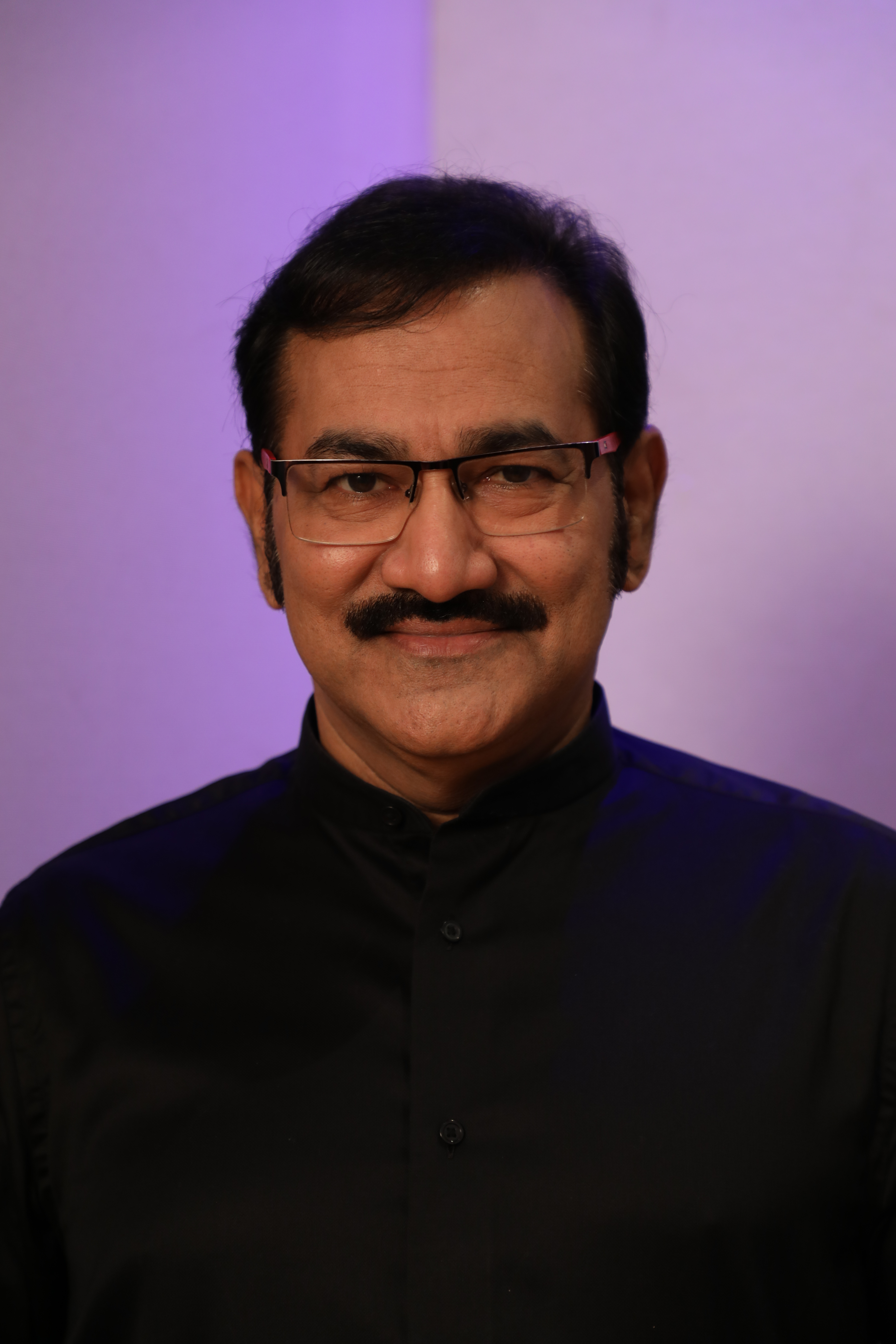
Sudesh Bhosale, Kanth Sangeet Award

=== Film and director awards ===
| Best Film I (Dadasaheb Phalke Award) | Best Director I (Bhalji Pendharkar Award) |
|---|---|
| Me Vasantrao | Nipun Dharmadhikari – Me Vasantrao |
| Best Film II (Baburao Painter Award) | Best Director II (Raja Paranjape Award) |
| Baaplyok | Makarand Mane – Baaplyok |
| Best Film III (Master Vinayak Award) | Best Director III (Raja Thakur Award) |
| Goshta Eka Paithanichi | Shantanu Rode – Goshta Eka Paithanichi |
| Best Rural Film (Dada Kondke Award) | Best Rural Film Director (Anant Mane Award) |
| Sumi | Amol Gole – Sumi |
| Best Social Film (V. Shantaram Award) | Best Social Film Director (Datta Dharmadhikari Award) |
| GodaKaath; Me Vasantrao; Faas; Baaplyok; Goshta Eka Paithanichi; Bittersweet; Jayanti; Choricha Mamla; Sumi | Gajendra Ahire – GodaKaath; Nipun Dharmadhikari – Me Vasantrao; Avinash Kolte – Faas; Makarand Mane – Baaplyok; Shantanu Rode – Goshta Eka Paithanichi; Anant Mahadevan – Bittersweet; Shailesh Narwade – Jayanti; Priyadarshan Jadhav – Choricha Mamla; Amol Gole – Sumi |

=== Acting awards ===
| Best Actor (Shahu Modak and Sivaji Ganesan Award) | Best Actress (Smita Patil Award) |
|---|---|
| Rahul Deshpande – Me Vasantrao as Vasantrao Deshpande; Aroh Welankar – Funral as Heera; Siddharth Menon – June as Neel | Mrinmayee Godbole – GodaKaath as Preeti; Sayali Sanjeev – Goshta Eka Paithanichi as Indrayani; Akshaya Gurav – Bittersweet as Saguna |
| Best Supporting Actor (Chintamanrao Kolhatkar Award) | Best Supporting Actress (Shanta Hublikar and Hansa Wadkar Award) |
| Vitthal Kale – Baaplyok as Sagar; Nitin Bhajan – Sumi as Vasant; Pushkaraj Chirputkar – Me Vasantrao as Purushottam Laxman Deshpande | Prema Sakhardande – Funral as More Aaji; Neeta Shende – Baaplyok as Aai; Smita Tambe – Bittersweet as Savita |
| Best Child Artist (Gajanan Jagirdar Award) | Best Comedian Male (Damuanna Malvankar Award) |
| Anish Gosavi – Tak-Tak | Jitendra Joshi – Choricha Mamla as Nandan; Hemant Dhome – Choricha Mamla as Amarjit Patil |

=== Debut awards ===
| Best Debut Film Production | Best Debut Direction |
|---|---|
| June; Jayanti; Funral | Vaibhav Khisti, Suhrud Godbole – June; Shailesh Narwade – Jayanti; Vivek Dubey – Funral |
| Best Debut Actor (Kashinath Ghanekar Award) | Best Debut Actress (Ranjana Deshmukh Award) |
| Ruturaj Wankhede – Jayanti as Santya; Omprakash Shinde – Kaali Maati as Dr. Dhyaneshwar Bodke; Vaibhav Kale – Kalokhachya Parambya as Aalif | Pallavi Palkar – Faas as Laxmi; Payal Jadhav – Baaplyok as Mayuri; Resham Shrivardhan – June as Sakshi |

=== Music awards ===
| Best Playback Singer Male | Best Playback Singer Female |
|---|---|
| Rahul Deshpande – Me Vasantrao for "Vitthala Darshan Deun Jaa"; Ajay Gogavale – Baaplyok for "Uramandi Maya"; Adarsh Shinde – Firastya for "Aata Nava Surya Pahu De" | Prachi Rege – GodaKaath for "Majya Godabaila Jo Jo Jo"; Aanandi Joshi – Kaali Maati for "Aata Shwas Tu"; Savani Ravindra – Jivanacha Gondhal for "Yendya Hey Kasa Ghondalay" |
| Best Lyricist (G. D. Madgulkar Award) | Best Background Music |
| Guru Thakur – Baaplyok for "Umagaya Baap"; Vaibhav Joshi – Me Vasantrao for "Punav Raticha"; Gajendra Ahire – GodaKaath for "Gay Pathavnyashi" | Vijay Narayan Gavande – Baaplyok; Sarang Kulkarni, Saurabh Bhalerao – Me Vasantrao; Advait Nemlekar – Funral |
| Best Music Director (Arun Paudwal Award) | Best Choreography |
| Rahul Deshpande – Me Vasantrao for "Vitthala Darshan Deun Jaa"; Vijay Narayan Gavande – Baaplyok for "Uramandi Maya"; Rohit Nagbhide – Firastya for "Aata Nava Surya Pahu De" | Sujit Kumar – Choricha Mamla for "Album Kaadhaal Kay"; Sharvari Jamenis – Me Vasantrao for "Punav Raticha"; Sujit Kumar – Goshta Eka Paithanichi for "Tumchyasathi Ready Raya" |

=== Writing awards ===
| Best Story (Madhusudan Kalelkar Award) | Best Screenplay |
|---|---|
| Vitthal Kale – Baaplyok; Ramesh Dighe – Funral; Shantanu Rode – Goshta Eka Paithanichi | Shantanu Rode – Goshta Eka Paithanichi; Makarand Mane, Vitthal Kale – Baaplyok; Gajendra Ahire – GodaKaath |
Best Dialogue (Acharya Atre Award)
Makarand Mane, Vitthal Kale – Baaplyok; Ramesh Dighe – Funral; Shantanu Rode – Goshta Eka Paithanichi

=== Technical awards ===
| Best Costume Design | Best Makeup |
|---|---|
| Sachin Lovalekar – Me Vasantrao | Saurabh Kapade – Me Vasantrao |
| Best Cinematography (Pandurang Naik Award) | Best Editing |
| Abhimanyu Dange – Me Vasantrao | Manish Shirke – Goshta Eka Paithanichi |
| Best Sound Mixing | Best Sound Editing |
| Anmol Bhave – Me Vasantrao | Rashi Butte – Bittersweet |
Best Art Direction (Saheb Mama aka Fateh Lal Award)
Ashok Lokare, A. Rucha – Me Vasantrao

=== Special awards ===
Raj Kapoor Award
- Asha Parekh
Raj Kapoor Special Contribution Award
- N. Chandra
V. Shantaram Lifetime Achievement Award
- Shivaji Satam
V. Shantaram Special Contribution Award
- Digpal Lanjekar
Lata Mangeshkar Award
- Anuradha Paudwal
Vitthal Smruti Special Contribution Award
- Rohini Hattangadi
Kanth Sangeet Award
- Sudesh Bhosale

== Superlatives ==
Multiple wins
| Awards | Film |
|---|---|
| 10 | Me Vasantrao |
| 7 | Baaplyok |
| 4 | Goshta Eka Paithanichi |
| 4 | GodaKaath |
| 2 | Sumi |
| 2 | Choricha Mamla |
| 2 | June |
| 1 | Funral |
| 1 | Tak-Tak |
| 1 | Jayanti |
| 1 | Faas |
| 1 | Bittersweet |
