= Ringan (film) =

- Directed by: Makarand Mane
- Written by: Makarand Mane
- Produced by: Vitthal Patil, Ganesh Phuke, Mahesh Yewale, Yogesh Nikam, Makarand Mane, Vidhi Kasliwal
- Starring: Shashank Shende, Sahil Joshi
- Cinematography: Abhijit Abde
- Edited by: Suchitra Sathe
- Music by: Rohit Nagbhide
- Release dates: May 2015 (Stuttgart); 30 June 2017
- Running time: 106 minutes
- Country: India
- Language: Marathi

Ringan (transl. Arena) is a 2015 Marathi Drama, directed by Makarand Mane. Has won Best Marathi Film at the 63rd National Film Awards, it also received six awards at the 53rd Maharashtra state level in the categories of Best Film, Best Director, Best Debut (Director), Best Actor, Best Cinematography, and Best Child Actor, and was shown at international film festivals in Cannes, Stuttgart, London, and Toronto.

A Landmarc Films Presentation and a My Role Motion Pictures Production, Ringan was released in theatres on 30 June 2017.

== Cast and crew ==
Shashank Shende and Sahil Joshi play the lead roles of father Arjun and son Abhimanyu. The director Mane mentions that Shende was his very first choice for the role of the father as soon as the initial draft of the film was ready. Joshi and other cast members Suhas Sirsat, Umesh Jagtap, Abhay Mahajan, Kalyanee Mulay and Ketan Pawar were selected from auditions. As Joshi had no acting experience, he had to go through a three-month long training before the filming. Mane and executive producer Sanjay Dawra had worked together in Marathi serial Agnihotra when Mane was assistant director. Along with Dawra several other technician friends believed in Mane's vision and ability and backed him on his directorial debut.

== Cast ==
- Shashank Shende as Arjun Magar
- Master Sahil Joshi as Abhimanyu Arjun Magar
- Suhas Sirsat as Babu
- Kayanee Mulay as Manjhi
- Abhay Mahajan as Nilesh
- Vitthal Patil as Conman
- Ketan Pawar as Farooq
- Umesh Jagtap as Raosaheb

== Production ==
The film was shot at various real locations in the crowded city of Pandharpur. Being a notable pilgrimage site for Hindus, the city is crowded with pilgrims and tourists. Mane assembled a fake filming crew to attract attention of audiences and then proceeded with the principal photography on other locations. Mane mentioned that as he grew up in Pandharpur, he had often seen farmers visit the pilgrimage for "seeking help from the almighty" and noticed that "when they left, they looked relieved, like Vithal had personally volunteered to help them through their rough patch". He also mentioned that the simplicity of a farmer's faith inspired him to write the film. Along with Pandharpur, the film was also shot in Akluj, Saswad and Pune. As the film's producers had budget constraints, the team of forty members either rented film-making instruments with reasonable charges or sometimes for free. Ajay Gogavale of Ajay–Atul music director duo rendered a soulful song without any remuneration.

The songs were composed by Rohit Nagbhide with lyrics by Vaibhav Deshmukh and Dasu Vaidya.

No.	Title	Singer(s)	Lyricist	Length
1	Dev Pahila	Ajay Gogavale	Vaibhav Deshmukh	3:18
2	Vitthala	Adarsh Shinde	Dasu Vaidya	3:30

== Reception ==
The film was screened at the Cannes Short Film Corner, London Indian Film Festival. It was adjudged as the Best Feature Film in Marathi for the year 2015 at the 63rd National Film Awards citing; "A heart rending survival story of a father-son duo, who decide to fight and live rather than end their lives". Makarand Mane was awarded with "The Director’s Vision Award" at the 14th Stuttgart Indian Film Festival (2015). The film was an entry in the 19th International Children's Film Festival of India.

== Accolades ==
Year	Ceremony	Category	Result	Ref.
2015	53rd Maharashtra State Film Award	Maharashtra State Film Award for Best Film	Won	
