= Andhar Maya =

Indian webseries

- Promotional poster
- Genre: Horror
- Created by: Pralhad Kudtarkar
- Written by: Pralhad Kudtarkar (Dialogues)
- Screenplay by: Kapil Bhopatkar
- Directed by: Bhimrao Mude
- Starring: Kishor Kadam; Rutuja Bagwe; Shubhankar Tawde; Swapnalee Patil; Shubhangi Bhujbal; Anup Belwalkar; Omprakash Shinde; Pihu Gosavi; Aarav Aeer
- Country of origin: India
- Original language: Marathi
- No. of episodes: 7

Production
- Producers: Sharmishtha Raut; Tejas Desai
- Production company: Ericon Telefilms

Original release
- Network: ZEE5
- Release: 30 May 2025

Andhar Maya is a Marathi language horror web series directed by Bhimrao Mude and produced by Sharmishtha Raut and Tejas Desai under the banner Ericon Telefilms. The story and dialogues are written by Pralhad Kudtarkar, and the screenplay is by Kapil Bhopatkar. The series stars Kishor Kadam in a lead role, along with Rutuja Bagwe, Shubhankar Tawde, Swapnalee Patil, Shubhangi Bhujbal, Anup Belwalkar, Omprakash Shinde, Pihu Gosavi, and Aarav Aeer. It follows the Khatu family, who return to their ancestral home, where they encounter a series of disturbing and unexplained events. The series premiered on ZEE5 on 30 May 2025.

== Premise ==
The series follows the Khatu family as they return to their ancestral home in the Konkan region to perform a final ritual. The mansion, known as a wada, has housed several generations of the family. Upon their return, the family experiences a series of unexplained and unsettling events. A child figure named Antushet is associated with these occurrences. The narrative also focuses on Gonya, a long-time servant of the household who has remained in the house through the years. As events unfold, past and present begin to converge, and members of the family start to go missing.

== Cast ==
- Kishor Kadam as Gonya
- Rutuja Bagwe as Madhavi
- Shubhankar Tawde as Kartik
- Swapnalee Patil
- Shubhangi Bhujbal as Nayna
- Anup Belwalkar as Keshav
- Omprakash Shinde as Manoj
- Pihu Gosavi as Sayli
- Aarav Aeer

== Production ==
=== Release ===
The series is set to premiere on 30 May 2025 on ZEE5. A promotional trailer was released on 19 May 2025.

=== Reception ===
Andhar Maya received mixed reviews from critics, with praise for its atmospheric setting and performances, but criticism for its execution and pacing.

Scroll.in noted that the series is initially overloaded with strange events, jump scares, and wonky camera angles. The ominousness is unrelenting, and the squabbling between the cousins over the fate of the property is enervating.

Loksatta praised the series for its gripping start and the unfolding mysteries within the ancestral home. The review highlighted the performances of Kishor Kadam, Rutuja Bagwe, and Shubhankar Tawde, stating that each episode increases the suspense.

M9 News criticized the series for its weak execution despite having an intriguing concept. The review pointed out that while the show has potential, it fails to deliver a satisfying experience due to its predictable storytelling and lack of impactful horror elements.

== Episodes ==
No.	Title	Directed by	Original release date
1	"The Homecoming"	Bhimrao Mude	30 May 2025
The Khatu family comes together at their old family home to carry out the final rites for Dinushet Khatu. Their caretaker, Gonya, welcomes them warmly, but each family member has a hidden agenda.
2	"Mystery Behind Dinu's Death"	Bhimrao Mude	30 May 2025
While exploring the house, Sayali, the daughter of Manoj and Shalaka, senses something unusual. As tensions rise among the family over what to do with the mansion, secrets surrounding Dinushet’s death begin to come to light.
3	"Where is Nayana"	Bhimrao Mude	30 May 2025
Sayali has an asthma attack just as Manoj and Shalaka’s hidden truths come out. Meanwhile, Keshav looks through his father’s Dashavatar outfits and jewelry. The next morning, both Nayana and the jewelry are gone.
4	"Dare To Leave?"	Bhimrao Mude	30 May 2025
The Khatu family searches desperately for Nayana and makes a startling discovery. Meanwhile, Sayali forms a bond with a roaming spirit named Antushet. In a sudden accident, Manoj and Shalaka lose their lives.
5	"Dance of Death"	Bhimrao Mude	30 May 2025
Keshav promises Gonya that the mansion won’t be sold, but the recent deaths in the family lead Kartik and his wife to decide to leave. Later, Keshav sees someone dressed in his father’s Dashavatar outfit.
6	"Not Without My Child"	Bhimrao Mude	30 May 2025
Kartik hurries to help Sayali during another asthma attack, but he’s unable to save her. He soon discovers that Gonya is responsible for the family’s deaths and tries to flee with Madhavi. Whether they make it out safely remains uncertain.
7	"It Begins Again"	Bhimrao Mude	30 May 2025
Madhavi tries to run from Gonya and the mansion to protect her child, but is confronted by the spirits of the Khatu family. She pleads with Gonya to spare her child’s life and then uncovers a shocking truth.
