= Albert Pinto Ko Gussa Kyoon Aata Hai? =

Albert Pinto Ko Gussa Kyun Aata Hai? may refer to:

- Albert Pinto Ko Gussa Kyoon Aata Hai? (1980 film)
- Albert Pinto Ko Gussa Kyoon Aata Hai? (2019 film)
