= Vitthal Patil =

Indian dancer, choreographer

- Born: 2 March 1975 (age 51); Belgaum, Karnataka, India
- Occupations: Choreographer, Actor, Producer
- Years active: 2004–present
- Spouse: Pallavi Tolye patil
- Children: Divij Patil
- Parent(s): Yallappa Krishna Patil(Father); Ratnabai Yallappa Patil (Mother)

Vitthal Patil is an Indian dancer, choreographer, film actor and producer. He was a former judge on the reality dance show, Halla Bol, shown on ETV Marathi. He has also choreographed for the films Naach, Khoya Khoya Chand, Dus Kahaniyaan, Acid Factory, Hijack and Aa Dekhen Zara. He has also produced the film, Ringan, which received the National Award for Best Marathi Movie. He has also acted in, produced and choreographed the recent film, Youngraad. He has won titles on the TV shows Dance Premier League and Zara Nachke Dikha.

== Early life ==
Vitthal Patil was born into a farming family in Malikwad, Belgaum district, Karnataka. He is the youngest of seven siblings. In his early years, Vitthal spent his time farming and attending school. He studied Arts at Wadai College (Pune). Later, he completed a course to become an electrician from the Industrial Training Institute and went on to work at NCVT Hindustan Antibiotics in Pune for one year. He also completed an internship at TATA Engineering and Locomotive Company (TELCO). He has also represented Maharashtra in athletic meets.

== Career ==
After spending a year working for Hindustan Antibiotics (Pune), Patil visited Mumbai where his friends took him to see film shoots, dance sequences, and the rest of production. This experience encouraged him to take dance seriously and to pursue professional dancing.

Patil started his Bollywood career as a background dancer with choreographers Farah Khan, Saroj Khan, Vaibhavi Merchant, Ahmed Khan and Remo D'Souza, among many others, after which he partnered with Harshall Kamat. He went on to choreograph winners of Nach Baliye, Dance Premier League and other such dance reality shows and music videos. He has also choreographed international stage shows, Bollywood shows, various Hindi, Marathi and South Indian films and also corporate launches, feature films, ad films and music videos. His film Ringan won the 63rd National Award.

He also choreographed recent Netflix film Yeh Ballet.

He has also appeared on the TV shows Nautanki The Comedy Theatre, Comedy Circus Ke Ajoobe, Comedy Circus Ka Naya Daur, Comedy Circus Ke Mahabali, Sab Ki Holi, Comedy Ka Jashn, Screen Awards, Indian Idol, Just Dance and Aaja Mahivey. He also won Zara Nachke Dikha and was a judge on the ETC Marathi show Halla Bol.

== Filmography ==
=== Film ===
Year	Title	Producer	Actor	Choreographer	Language	Role	Notes
2004	Naach			Yes	Hindi		
2004	Santosha			Yes	Kannada		
2004	Aapthudu			Yes	Telugu		Remake of Hindi film Ghatak: Lethal
2004	Shock			Yes	Tamil		
2005	James			Yes	Hindi		
2006	Darna Zaroori Hai			Yes	Hindi		
2006	Shiva			Yes	Hindi		
2006	Asadhyudu			Yes	Telugu		
2006	Aadi Lakshmi			Yes	Telugu		
2007	GO			Yes	Hindi		
2007	Ram Gopal Varma Ki Aag			Yes	Hindi		
2007	Khoya Khoya Chand			Yes	Hindi		
2007	Dus Kahaniyaan			Yes	Hindi		
2007	Anumanaspadam			Yes	Telugu		
2007	Evadaithe Nakenti			Yes	Telugu		
2008	Hijack			Yes	Hindi		
2009	Acid Factory			Yes	Hindi		
2009	Aa Dekhen Zara			Yes	Hindi		
2009	Gallit Gondhal Dillit Mujra			Yes	Marathi		Directed by Nagesh Bhonsle
2010	The Film Emotional Atyachar			Yes	Hindi		
2010	Pankh			Yes	Hindi		
2010	Horn 'Ok' Pleassss			Yes	Hindi		
2010	Tee Ratra			Yes	Marathi		Viju Mane
2012	72 Miles – Ek Pravas			Yes	Marathi		Directed by Rajiv Patil
2012	Vanshvel			Yes	Marathi		Rajiv Patil
2013	Sona Spa			Yes	Hindi		
2013	Oonga			Yes	Hindi		
2014	Baware Premi Hey			Yes	Marathi		Ajay Nayak
2014	Saturday Sunday			Yes	Marathi		Makrand Deshpandey
2014	Rakandar			Yes	Marathi		Mrunali patil unreleased
2015	Kairao Tumi			Yes	Marathi		Mrunali Patil unreleased
2015	Nachom-ia Kumpasar			Yes	Marathi		Bardroy Barretto
2016	Game		Yes		Kannada		
2017	Tu Hai Mera Sunday			Yes	Hindi		
2017	Ringan	Yes	Yes		Marathi		
2018	Shikari			Yes	Marathi		Viju Mane
2018	Monkey baat			Yes	Marathi		Viju mane
2018	Youngraad	Yes	Yes	Yes	Marathi		Directed by Makarand Mane
2019	Kagar			Yes	Marathi		Makarand Mane
2020	Make up			Yes	Marathi		Ganesh Pandit
2020	Yeh Ballet			Yes	Hindi		Sooni Taraporevala

=== Television ===
Year	Show	Network	Role	Notes
2006	Nach Baliye Season 2	Star Plus	Winning Team Choreographer	Tina Kuwajerwala and Hussain Kuwajerwala, Winners
2012	Comedy Ka Welcome	Sony TV		
2017	Lagir Zal Ji	Zee TV		Marathi TV Series

=== Stage appearances ===
- A.R. Rahman's Live Concert
- Directed & Choreographed Ajay Atul's concert
- Walt Disney
- Jai Jai Maharashtra maza

=== Other works ===
- Coles TVC
- Kickapoo TVC
