= Vitthal Kale =

Indian actor

- Born: Vitthal Nagnath Kale; Pangaon, Solapur, Maharashtra, India
- Occupations: Actor; writer
- Children: 1

Vitthal Nagnath Kale is an Indian actor and writer who primarily works in the Marathi film industry. He received two Maharashtra State Film Awards for his work on Baaplyok, winning Best Story and Best Supporting Actor.

== Early life and career ==
Kale was born in Pangaon village in Barshi taluka of Solapur district, Maharashtra. He completed his schooling at Sant Tukaram Vidyalaya and his college education at Shri Shivaji Vidyalaya. During his college years, he developed an interest in acting and actively participated in youth festivals. After completing his bachelor's degree in English, he pursued a Master’s degree in English Literature from Pune.

As he was unable to secure admission to the filmmaking course at Pune University, Kale frequently visited the campus with friends and gained practical exposure to acting and production. He later auditioned for a short film that was shown to veteran director Chandrakant Kulkarni, who cast him in his first significant role as Laxman Lohar in the Marathi film Tukaram, which became a turning point in his career.

After that, Kale performed with actor Shashank Shende in the theatre group Samanvay and participated in theatre festivals such as the Purushottam Karandak and the Thespo at the Prithvi Theatre. Since then, he has acted in many feature films like Hotel Mumbai, The Field, Punashcha Hari Om, Kaagar, Rakshas and Ghar Banduk Biryani, in addition to more than 115 short films through independent and digital cinema.

He also wrote the story for Baaplyok, a film centred on a father–son relationship, starring Shende as the father and Kale as the son, with Payal Jadhav and Neeta Shende in supporting roles. For Baaplyok, Kale received Maharashtra State Film Awards for Best Story and Best Supporting Actor.

== Filmography ==
=== Film ===
Year	Film	Role	Language	Ref.
2012	Tukaram	Laxman Lohar	Marathi	
2018	Hotel Mumbai	DC Kanu	Hindi	
2018	Rakshas	Parsu	Marathi	
2019	Kaagar	Bhavdya	Marathi	
2019	Aatpadi Nights	Parshuram	Marathi	
2019	Kaajro	Tilglya	Konkani	
2020	Kosa	Keshav	Hindi	
2021	Punashchha Hari Om	Ravi Parkar	Marathi	
2022	Jhund	Scorer	Hindi	
2023	Ghar Banduk Biryani	George	Marathi	
2023	Tendlya	Namya	Marathi	
2023	Baaplyok	Sagar	Marathi	
2024	Apsara	Bhaiya Saheb	Marathi	
2024	Like Aani Subscribe	Faisal	Marathi	
2025	Gondhal	Mohan	Marathi	
2026	Frame		Marathi	

=== Web series ===
Year	Title	Role	Language	Ref.
2018	Ek Thi Begum	Iqbal Khan	Marathi; Hindi	
2020	The Missing Stone	Somnath	Hindi	
2024	Manvat Murders	Kaachu Paaku	Marathi	

=== Short film ===
- Aranyak (2015)
- Aushadh (2016)
- The Field (2018)

== Award and nominations ==
Year	Award	Category	Nominated work	Result	Ref.
2024	Maharashtra State Film Awards	Best Supporting Actor	Baaplyok	Won	
2024	Maharashtra State Film Awards	Best Story	Baaplyok	Won	
2024	Maharashtra State Film Awards	Best Screenplay	Baaplyok	Nominated	
2024	Maharashtra State Film Awards	Best Dialogues	Baaplyok	Nominated	
2024	Filmfare Awards Marathi	Best Supporting Actor	Baaplyok	Won	
2024	Zee Chitra Gaurav Puraskar	Best Supporting Actor	Baaplyok	Won	
2025	Goa State Film Festival	Best Actor	Kaajro	Won	
