= Zee Chitra Gaurav Puraskar for Best Supporting Actor =

Award

- Awarded for: Best Performance by an Actor in a Supporting Role
- Country: India
- Presented by: Zee Marathi
- First award: Kishor Kadam; Jogwa (2009)
- Currently held by: Kshitish Date; Dharmaveer 2 (2025)

Zee Chitra Gaurav Puraskar for Best Supporting Actor is presented by Zee Marathi as part of its annual Zee Chitra Gaurav Puraskar, for best acting done by an actor in Marathi films, who are selected by the jury. The award was first given in 2010 for films released in 2009.

== Winners ==
Year	Actor	Roles(s)	Film	Ref.
2009	Girish Kulkarni	Jeevan	Valu	
2009	Kishor Kadam	Yamnya	Jogwa	
2010	Kishor Kadam	Pandoba	Natarang	
2011	Ravi Kale	Vithal	Paradh	
2012	Vidyadhar Joshi	Ratan Shah	Arjun	
2013	Sanjay Khapre	Balwant Phadke	Kaksparsh	
2014	Kishor Kadam	Kachru Mane (Nana)	Fandry	
2015	Hrishikesh Joshi	Sadanand Kulkarni (Master)	Poshter Boyz	
2016	Vikram Gokhale	Rambhau	Natsamrat	
2017	Priyadarshan Jadhav	Kaddus	Halal	
2018	Vijay Nikam	Ketaki's father	Mala Kahich Problem Nahi	
2019	Saksham Kulkarni	Narya	Ziprya	
2020	Satish Alekar	Appa	Smile Please	
2021	Not Awarded			
2022	Not Awarded			
2023	Pushkaraj Chirputkar	Purushottam Laxman Deshpande	Me Vasantrao	
2023	Sanjay Mone	Nishikant's father	Godavari	
2023	Kshitish Date	Eknath Shinde	Dharmaveer	
2023	Gashmeer Mahajani	Chhatrapati Shivaji Maharaj / Chhatrapati Sambhaji Maharaj	Sersenapati Hambirrao	
2023	Amey Wagh	Jay Dixit	Ananya	
2024	Vitthal Kale	Sagar	Baaplyok	
2024	Siddharth Chandekar	Kabir Kulkarni	Jhimma 2	
2024	Subodh Bhave	Dr. Anshuman	Vaalvi	
2024	Akshay Tak	Raja Mayekar	Maharashtra Shahir	
2025	Kshitish Date	Eknath Shinde	Dharmaveer 2	
2025	Kshitish Date	Shrimant Sawai Madhavrao Peshwa	Phullwanti	
2025	Sunil Abhanyankar	Nana Fadnavis	Phullwanti	
2025	Sanjay Mone	Bhau Gharat	Gharat Ganpati	
2025	Upendra Limaye	Prakash Dagdu Bhope (Pakya Bhai)	Juna Furniture	
