= Baaplyok =

- Theatrical release poster
- Directed by: Makarand Mane
- Written by: Vitthal Kale; Makarand Mane
- Produced by: Vijay Shinde; Shashank Shende; Makarand Mane
- Starring: Vitthal Kale; Shashank Shende; Payal Jadhav; Neeta Shende
- Cinematography: Yogesh Koli
- Edited by: Aashay Gatade
- Music by: Vijay Narayan Gavande
- Production companies: 99 Productions; Bahuroopi Productions
- Distributed by: Sunshine Studios
- Release date: 1 September 2023
- Country: India
- Language: Marathi

Baaplyok is a 2023 Indian Marathi-language family drama film co-written and directed by Makarand Mane and produced by 99 Productions and Bahurupi Productions. The film stars Vitthal Kale, Shashank Shende, Payal Jadhav, and Neeta Shende in leading roles. The music and background score are composed by Vijay Narayan Gavande, with lyrics by Guru Thakur and Vaibhav Deshmukh.

It was released in theaters on 1 September 2023.

At the Maharashtra State Film Awards, the film won seven awards, including Best Story and Best Supporting Actor for Vitthal Kale.

== Plot ==
The trip thereon shapes human character, even when the road ahead may be straight and level. Sagar's father and he set out to send wedding invitations to Sagar's distant relatives. However, the task is not as simple. In order to live with his parents in the rural and work as a farmer, Sagar quit his career in Pune. "Farmers are not good suitors," but Sagar has somehow found a wife, and the two are soon to wed. Sagar and his father are constantly at conflict with one another for no apparent reason. Their journey and relationship in the hands of the dust and soil of the road are characterised by this father-son tension. You must take on duties as you get older, yet your family's rules still apply. As you become older, you need to take on more responsibility, but your family also needs to pass that responsibility along. Such a transfer of accountability is depicted in this father-son journey.

== Cast ==
- Vitthal Kale as Sagar
- Shashank Shende as Tatya
- Payal Jadhav as Mayuri
- Neeta Shende as Aai

== Release ==
=== Theatrical ===
The film was theatrically released on 1 September 2023. Nagraj Manjule, an presenter of the film postponed the release from 25 August 2023 to 1 September 2023 to avoid clash with Subhedar.

=== Home media ===
Baaplyok was digitally released on Amazon Prime Video.

== Reception ==
Sanjay Ghavre of Lokmat gave 3.5/5 and wrote "From the screenplay to the dialogues and from the dialect to the acting, this film sheds light on the most important relationships in the life of the village environment at every level."

Kalpeshraj Kubal of Maharashtra Times rated 3.0/5 and gave positive review. Devendra Jadhav of Sakal praised performances, music, and dialogues.

== Awards ==
Year	Award	Category	Nominee (s)	Result	Ref.
2024	Maharashtra State Film Award	Best Story	Vitthal Kale	Won	
2024	Maharashtra State Film Award	Best Dialogues	Vitthal Kale, Makarand Mane	Won	
2024	Maharashtra State Film Award	Best Screenplay	Vitthal Kale, Makarand Mane	Nominated	
2024	Maharashtra State Film Award	Best Lyricist	Guru Thakur for "Umagaya Baap"	Won	
2024	Maharashtra State Film Award	Best Music	Vijay Narayan Gavande for "Uramandi Maya"	Nominated	
2024	Maharashtra State Film Award	Best Background Music	Vijay Gavande	Won	
2024	Maharashtra State Film Award	Best Playback Singer Male	Ajay Gogavale for "Uramandi Maya"	Nominated	
2024	Maharashtra State Film Award	Best Supporting Actress	Nita Shinde	Nominated	
2024	Maharashtra State Film Award	Best Supporting Actor	Vitthal Kale	Won	
2024	Maharashtra State Film Award	Best Debut Actress	Payal Jadhav	Nominated	
2024	Maharashtra State Film Award	Best Film II	Baaplyok	Won	
2024	Maharashtra State Film Award	Best Director II	Makarand Mane	Won	
2024	Zee Chitra Gaurav Puraskar	Best Film	Baaplyok	Won	
2024	Zee Chitra Gaurav Puraskar	Best Director	Makarand Mane	Won	
2024	Zee Chitra Gaurav Puraskar	Best Actor	Shashank Shende	Won	
2024	Zee Chitra Gaurav Puraskar	Best Supporting Actor	Vitthal Kale	Won	
2024	Zee Chitra Gaurav Puraskar	Best Music Director	Vijay Narayan Gavande	Nominated	
2024	Zee Chitra Gaurav Puraskar	Best Lyricist	Guru Thakur for "Umgaya Baap"	Nominated	
2024	Zee Chitra Gaurav Puraskar	Best Playback Singer – Male	Ajay Gogavale for "Umgaya Baap"	Nominated	
2024	Aaryans Sanman	Best Film	Baaplyok	Nominated	
2024	Aaryans Sanman	Best Director	Makarand Mane	Nominated	
2024	Aaryans Sanman	Best Actor	Shashank Shende	Nominated	
2024	Aaryans Sanman	Best Screenplay	Vitthal Kale, Makarand Mane	Nominated	
2024	Aaryans Sanman	Best Story	Vitthal Kale	Nominated	
2024	Aaryans Sanman	Best Supporting Actor	Vitthal Kale	Nominated	
2024	Aaryans Sanman	Best Supporting Actress	Neeta Shende	Won	
2024	Aaryans Sanman	Promising Actor / Actress	Bhagwant Shyamraj	Nominated	
2024	Aaryans Sanman	Best Lyricist	Guru Thakur	Won	
2024	Aaryans Sanman	Best Custom Designer	Anuttama Naikwadi	Nominated	
2024	Aaryans Sanman	Best Background Music	Vijay Narayan Gavande	Nominated	
2024	Aaryans Sanman	Best Music	Vijay Narayan Gavande	Nominated	
2024	Aaryans Sanman	Best Singer Male	Ajay Gogavale	Nominated	
