= Territory (2023 film) =

Territory Marathi Film

- Theatrical release poster
- Directed by: Sachin Shriram
- Written by: Sachin Shriram
- Produced by: Shriram Mullemwar; Leela Mullemwar; Sachin Shriram
- Starring: Sandeep Kulkarni; Kishor Kadam
- Cinematography: Krishna Soren
- Edited by: Mayur Hardas
- Music by: Yash Pagare
- Production company: Divine Touch Productions
- Distributed by: Filmastra Studios
- Release date: 1 September 2023
- Country: India
- Language: Marathi

Territory is a 2023 Indian Marathi-language thriller film based on a cannibal tiger in the village Pandharkaoda situated in district Yavatmal, Maharashtra. The film is written and directed by Sachin Shriram, starring Sandeep Kulkarni and Kishor Kadam in the leading roles. It was theatrically released on 1 September 2023.

The film was screened in several film festivals like Pune International Film Festival, Kolkata International Film Festival, Gangtok International Film Festival and Cannes Film Market. On the occasion of World Tiger Day film poster was unveiled by Minister of Forests of Maharashtra Sudhir Mungantiwar.

== Cast ==
- Sandeep Kulkarni
- Kishor Kadam
