= Shubhankar Tawde =

Indian actor (born 1994)

- Born: 26 October 1994 (age 31); Mumbai, Maharashtra, India
- Occupation: Actor
- Years active: 2017–present
- Father: Sunil Tawde

Shubhankar Tawde (born 26 October 1994) is an Indian actor who works in Marathi films. He is the son of veteran actor Sunil Tawde. In 2019 He made his lead role debut in Kaagar, a romantic political thriller film directed by Makarand Mane Opposite Rinku Rajguru and went on to win the Filmfare Award for Best Male Debut – Marathi.

== Early life and background ==
Tawde was born on 26 October 1994 in Mumbai to Sunil Tawde, a veteran actor in Marathi films, and Sonali Tawde, a homemaker.

== Filmography ==
=== Film ===
Key
†	Denotes films that have not yet been released

Year	Title	Role	Notes	Ref
2019	Kaagar	Yuvraj Kadam	Debut film	
2022	Ved	Jonty	Remake of Majili a Telugu Movie	
2024	8 Don 75	Amol Moghe		
2024	Kanni	Soham Kalsekar		
2024	Like Aani Subscribe	Ravi		
2025	Gaadi Number 1760			
TBA	Thakabai †	TBA		
TBA	The Trap: Daav Pech †	Kabir Soman	Post-production	
TBA	Dil Dosti Duniyadari †	Tharun		

=== Television ===
Year	Title	Role	Notes	Ref
2016–2017	Freshers	Sangram Patil	Debut	
2026–present	Pathrakhin	Alok Suryavanshi	Lead Role	

=== Web Series ===
Year	Title	Role	Notes	Ref
2019	Kaale Dhande	Vicky		

== Awards and nominations ==
Year	Award	Category	Work	Result	Ref.
2022	Best Actor & Director Awards	Best Supporting Actor	8 Don 75	Won	
2022	Birsamunda International Film Festival	Best Supporting Actor	8 Don 75	Won	
2022	DRUK International Film Festival	Outstanding Achievement Award for Best Actor	8 Don 75	Won	
2020	Filmfare Awards Marathi	Best Male Debut	Kaagar	Won	
2022	Gangtok International Film Festival	Best Actor	8 Don 75	Won	
2022	Indo French International Film Festival	Best Actor International & Indian Feature Film	8 Don 75	Won	
2022	South Film and Arts Academy Festival	Honorable Mention Best Lead Actor	8 Don 75	Won	
2022	Wisdom Tree International Film Festival	Best Supporting Actor	8 Don 75	Won	
