= Sasu Cha Swayamwar =

- Directed by: Omkar Mane
- Screenplay by: Omkar Mane
- Story by: Vaibhav Raut
- Produced by: Santosh Parab
- Starring: Pushkar Jog; Teja Deokar; Vishakha Subhedar; Vijay Chavan; Jaywant Wadkar; Satish Tare; Sunil Pal Mayur Lonkar
- Cinematography: Milind Phadnis
- Edited by: ShriVallabh More
- Music by: Vivek – Nakool
- Distributed by: Seven Seas Motion Pictures Pvt.Ltd.
- Release date: 24 April 2015
- Running time: 130 minutes
- Country: India
- Language: Marathi

Sasu Cha Swayamwar is a 2015 Marathi romantic comedy movie written and directed by Omkar Mane. It stars Pushkar Jog, Teja Deokar, Vishaka Subhedar, Vijay Chavan, Satish Tare, Jaywant Wadkar and Sunil Pal. The film is produced by Seven Seas Motion Pictures. The film will be released on 24 April 2015.

== Plot ==
The frustrated Mohan seeks an eligible groom for his interfering Sasu. that he has inherited in his dowry. The unwanted dowry takes his life through various levels of hell so he arranges a swayamwara and story starts happening. To palm off his Sasu he finds three bachelors. This story is all about how the Sasu gets married and lead to an unexpected ending.

== Cast ==
- Pushkar Jog as Mohan Dekhne
- Teja Deokar as Nandini Dekhne
- Vishakha Subhedar as Lalitadevi
- Vijay Chavan as Sartape
- Jaywant Wadkar as Chadda Singh
- Satish Tare as Dr. Belapure
- Sunil Pal as Baji
- Bhargavi Chirmule as Bhargavi Chirmule

== Awards ==
Salam Pune Awards

Best Young Director – Omkar Mane

Best Actress in Comic role – Vishakha Subhedar
