= Kaagar =

- Theatrical release poster
- Directed by: Makarand Mane
- Written by: Sanjay Pawar; Makarand Mane (Dialogue)
- Screenplay by: Makarand Mane
- Produced by: Sudhir Kolte; Vikas Hande
- Starring: Rinku Rajguru; Shashank Shende; Shubhankar Tawde
- Cinematography: Abhijeet Abde
- Edited by: Suchitra Sathe
- Music by: AV Prafullachandra
- Production companies: Viacom18 Studios; Udaharnarth Nirmit; Bahuroopi Productions
- Release date: 26 April 2019
- Running time: 130 minutes
- Country: India
- Language: Marathi

Kaagar is a 2019 Indian Marathi-language Romantic political thriller film directed by Makarand Mane and produced by Viacom18 Studios and Udaharnarth Nirmit in association with Bahuroopi Productions. The film stars Rinku Rajguru, Shashank Shende, Shubhankar Tawde. It was theatrically released on 26 April 2019.

== Plot ==
In a small Maharashtrian town, a woman's rise in the political hierarchy creates ripples across the social-political spectrum. Parallelly, her romance with one of her father's students causes troubles in her personal & professional life.

== Cast ==
- Rinku Rajguru as Rani / Priydarshani Prabhakarrao Deshmukh
- Shubhankar Tawde as Yuvraj Kadam
- Shashank Shende as Guruji/Prabhakar Rao Deshmukh
- Suhas Palshikar as Aabasaheb Gaikwad
- Bharati Patil as Rani's mother
- Umesh Jagtap as Inspector Yogesh Nikam
- Millind Pathak as Shailesh Rao Gupta
- Shatanu Gangane as Bhaiyasaheb/Bhujang Gaikwad
- Vitthal Kale as Bhavdya
- Vitthal Patil as Qawwali performer
- Yogesh Nikam as Kavval
- Mahesh Bhosale as Amar

== Production ==
Kaagar is produced by Viacom18 Studios and Udaharnarth Nirmit in association with Bahuroopi Productions. As the story of the film focuses on rural areas, the film was shot in Akluj and nearby rural areas of town.

== Soundtrack ==
Kaagar

Soundtrack album by AV Prafullachandra
- Released: 19 April 2019
- Genre: Feature film soundtrack
- Length: 24:27
- Language: Marathi
- Label: Zee Music Company

Official audio
- Kaagar - Full Album on YouTube

Kaagar - BGM

Film score by AV Prafullachandra
- Released: 10 June 2021
- Genre: Background score
- Length: 25:23
- Label: Zee Music Company
- Compiler: Ajeeth

Official audio
- Kaagar - BGM - Full Album on YouTube

Music and background score is composed by AV Prafullachandra. Songs are recorded by Kavita Ram, Vivek Naik, Rahul Chitnis, Santosh Bote, Jasraj Joshi, Rucha Bondre, Shashaa Tirupati, Harshavardhan Wavare, Adarsh Shinde, Pravin Kunwar, Amaan Khaan, Jazim Sharma, Amruta Subhash, Manish Rajgire. Lyrics by Vaibhav Deshmukh.

All lyrics are written by Vaibhav Deshmukh; all music is composed by AV Prafullachandra.

Track listing
No.	Title	Singer (s)	Length
1.	"Darval Mavhacha"	Kavita Ram, Vivek Naik, Rahul Chitnis, Santosh Bote	3:39
2.	"Gondan Pirmach"	Jasraj Joshi, Rucha Bondre	3:53
3.	"Lagliya Godi Tujhi"	Shashaa Tirupati, Harshavardhan Wavare	3;18
4.	"Nagin Dance"	Adarsh Shinde, Pravin Kunwar	3:31
5.	"Shah-E-Makhdum Ali Vali"	Amaan Khaan, Jazim Sharma	4:16
6.	"Tula Futu De Kaagar"	Amruta Subhash, Manish Rajgire	4:39
Total length:			24:27

== Release ==
Kaagar was theatrically released on 26 April 2019 and available for streaming on Netflix. Initially film was released on 7 February 2019 but pushed due to production.

== Reception ==
Kaagar received mixed reviews from critics. Shalmesh More of Koimoi rated it 3.5 out of 5 and praised the strong performances and direction. Criticized for trying to retain specific treatment, even explaining that some scenes go over the top. The music of the film is very loud, especially in the action sequences. Also the background score goes overboard. Nandini Ramnath of Scroll.in wrote "The film doesn't know how to deal with Rani and the talented actress for her role. Rani's bitter choice between love and duty falls by the wayside as Kagar runs into a scandal that no one saw coming because in the real world don't things end like that? The opening credits declare that Rinku Rajguru has been "reintroduced" by Kaagar, but despite getting top billing, Rani slips to the bottom of the pile. Rajguru is still at large, but this time there is no clear direction." Ibrahim Afgan of Maharashtra Times gave 2.5 out of 5 and criticised shallowness of characters, ignorance of subject matter, and clumsiness of story limits this movie. From background music to acting, its immaturity makes the film mediocre. A new political leadership in the new era is a good subject, but it needs not only the will but also the right support. This error has made this an artifact common. Chitrali Chogale of Times Now Marathi gave 2.5 out of 5 and wrote "An only daughter of a spacious political family and her lover from a poor house, he is accompanied by his two friends and the difficulties faced by this love, is somewhere back to the plot of Sairat movie, but the movie does not make that much impact. The uniqueness of Rinku's character, the broken story in the film and the stretched story towards the end, at least if these things were played out, the film would have been effective." The Times of India gave 2.5 out of 5 and opined as average experience.
