= Razzakar =

2015 film

- Directed by: Raj Durge
- Produced by: Satish Pillangwad
- Starring: Shashank Shende; Siddhartha Jadhav; Jyoti Subhash; Zakhir Hussian
- Cinematography: Aniket Khandagle
- Edited by: Ganapathy Subramanian
- Music by: Salil Amrute
- Release date: 27 February 2015
- Running time: 137 minutes
- Country: India
- Language: Marathi

Razzakar is an Indian Marathi-language film written and directed by Raj Durge. The film, starring Siddhartha Jadhav, Jyoti Subhash, Shashank Shende, Zakhir Hussian, was released on 27 February 2015.

== Synopsis ==
Razzakar is based on a story about the Hyderabad Liberation Movement (from the Razakars (Hyderabad)) of 1948. The film shows the protagonist's journey from a commoner to that of a freedom fighter.

== Cast ==
- Shashank Shende
- Siddhartha Jadhav as Hari
- Jyoti Subhash
- Zakhir Hussian

== Release ==
The film was theatrically released on 27 February 2015. It was dubbed in Telugu and released in Andhra Pradesh and Telangana.

== Soundtrack ==
Razzakar

Soundtrack album by Salil Amrute
- Released: 2015
- Recorded: 2015
- Genre: Feature film soundtrack
- Length: 12:58
- Language: Marathi

Official audio
- Razzakar – Full Album on YouTube

Track listing
No.	Title	Singer(s)	Length
1.	"Dhyaas Ek Shwaas Ek"	Manoj Desai , Meghana Desai	3:55
2.	"Petaleli Mana"	Meghana Desai	4:44
3.	"Jevha Bhutalavari Matala Daitya"	Sanjeev Chimmalgi	4:59
Total length:			12:58

== Reception ==
=== Critical reception ===
The film received mixed reviews from critics. A reviewer from Divya Marathi gave the film a rating of 3/5 and wrote "The film is well done as the technical skills have a good grip on the screenplay. Every scene from the first frame to the last is very well constructed". A reviewer from The Times of India gave the film a rating of 2.5/5 and wrote "Keeping the narrative crisp and giving more focus on the history bit would have done wonders for this film. Unfortunately, what we get is a half-baked cake that refuses to finish". Ganesh Matkari of Pune Mirror wrote "The actors in Razakar somehow manage this over a very long stretch of time. I only wish they had something to show for their patience and hard work". Jaydeep Pathak of Maharashtra Times gave the film 1.5 stars out of 5 and says "We should read and study this bloody history. Why should you waste your precious time by watching movies in such category only with such efforts?".

== See also ==
- 23rd March 1931: Shaheed
- Kesari
- Mangal Pandey: The Rising
