= Gharat Ganpati =

2024 Indian film directed by Navjyot Narendra Bandiwadekar

- Theatrical release poster
- Directed by: Navjyot Bandiwadekar
- Written by: Alok Sutar; Navjyot Bandiwadekar
- Produced by: Kumar Mangat Pathak; Abhishek Pathak; Namrata Narendra Bandiwadekar; Navjyot Bandiwadekar; Gauri Kalelkar Choudhari
- Starring: Nikita Dutta; Bhushan Pradhan; Ajinkya Deo; Ashwini Bhave; Sanjay Mone; Shubhangi Latkar; Shubhangi Gokhale
- Cinematography: Shelly Sharma; Prasad Bhende
- Edited by: Ashish Mhatre
- Music by: Sanket Sane
- Production companies: Navigns Studio; Panorama Studios
- Distributed by: Panorama Studios
- Release date: 26 July 2024
- Country: India
- Language: Marathi
- Box office: ₹4.75 crore

Gharat Ganpati is a 2024 Indian Marathi-language family drama film co-written and directed by Navjyot Narendra Bandiwadekar under the production and distribution of Panorama Studios in association with Navigns Studio. The film stars an ensemble cast with Nikita Dutta, Bhushan Pradhan, Ajinkya Deo, Ashwini Bhave alongside Sanjay Mone, Shubhangi Latkar and Shubhangi Gokhale. Set in Konkan, the film showcases the Gharat family's annual tradition of welcoming Gauri Ganpati, highlighting how this cherished practice spans three generations and brings the family closer together by navigating generational differences and strengthening their bonds.

Principal photography began in December 2022 and was completed in June 2023, with filming taking place across the states of Maharashtra and Kerala.

Gharat Ganpati was released on 26 July 2024 and received critical acclaim along with a commercial success, grossing over ₹4.75 crore (US$490,000) worldwide. At the 72nd National Film Awards, Abhay Jodhpurkar won Best Male Playback Singer for the song Navasachi Gauri Mazi. At Zee Chitra Gaurav Puraskar the film received 16 nominations and won two awards, including Best Supporting Actor for Bhave, while at 9th Filmfare Awards Marathi it received 12 nomination and won for Best Director Debut for Bandiwadekar.

== Plot ==
The Gharat family gathers at their ancestral home in Konkan to celebrate the Ganesh festival. The reunion brings together three generations, each carrying their own joys, struggles, and unresolved conflicts.

At the centre are Appa (Dr. Sharad Bhutadiya) and Mai (Sushma Deshpande), the family elders. Their elder son Bhau (Sanjay Mone) lives in the ancestral home with his wife Sunanda (Shubhangi Latkar). Their son Jeetu (Ashish Pathode) secretly loves Aashna (Divyalaxmi Maisanam), an Assamese girl, but hides his feelings due to his father's short temper. Jeetu also dreams of starting a tourism business in the village, but his ambitions remain unspoken. His sister, Deepali (Pari Telang), lives there too with her husband, Ashok (Sameer Khandekar).

The younger son, Sharad (Ajinkya Deo), arrives from Mumbai with his wife Ahilya (Ashwini Bhave) and daughter Neha (Rajasi Bhave). Their son, Ketan (Bhushan Pradhan), joins them from Delhi along with his girlfriend, Kriti (Nikita Dutta). Kriti makes every effort to win over the family, but Ahilya remains opposed to her because of cultural differences and her family background. Tensions between mother and son deepen as a result.

Living under the same roof is Appa's daughter, Kusum Aatya (Shubhangi Gokhale), who was once forced into marriage against her will. Now separated, she stays with her son Ninad (Rupesh Bane), carrying the weight of past decisions that still affect her present.

As the festival unfolds, old wounds resurface and new bonds are tested. Bhau and Sunanda's financial limitations contrast sharply with Sharad and Ahilya's comfortable lifestyle, creating subtle friction between the two households. Sharad's suggestion to reduce the Ganpati celebration from seven days to one-and-a-half ignites debates around tradition, modernity, and practicality.

Amidst rituals, confrontations, and moments of reflection, each member of the Gharat family faces a turning point. Jeetu finds the courage to take charge of his own life, Ketan and Kriti confront opposition to their relationship, and Ahilya begins to reassess her rigid stance. In the process, long-standing tensions soften, and the family rediscovers the bonds that hold them together.

== Cast ==
- Nikita Dutta as Kriti Ahuja
- Bhushan Pradhan as Ketan Sharad Gharat
- Ajinkya Deo as Sharad Jayantrao Gharat
- Ashwini Bhave as Ahilya Sharad Gharat
- Sanjay Mone as Bhau Jayantrao Gharat
- Shubhangi Latkar as Sunanda Bhau Gharat
- Shubhangi Gokhale as Kusum
- Sushma Deshpande as Maai Jayantrao Gharat
- Dr. Sharad Bhutadia as Jayantrao (Appa) Gharat
- Sameer Khandekar as Ashok
- Ashish Pathode as Jitu Bhau Gharat
- Pari Telang as Deepali
- Rajasi Bhave as Neha Sharad Gharat
- Rupesh Bane as Ninad
- Divyalaxmi Maisanam as Aashna
- Atul Parchure as the voice of Ganesha
- Chinmay Shintre as Joshi Guruji
- Pradip Mirgal as doctor
- Amol Redij as Khot
- Vidyadhar Karlekar as Gajanan Khade
- Prabhakar Daool as Vinayak Khade
- Sail Kokate as Babu Khade
- Prafulla Ghag as Bank manager
- Akshata Kambali as Patpedhi cashier
- Yogesh Bandagale as coconut seller
- Harak Bharatiya as young Bhau
- Jayesh Bhor as young Sharad
- Sachin Kale as Namya
- Arpita Ghogharde as Kavita
- Sangeeta Joshi as Kavita's mom

== Production ==
Director Navjyot Bandiwadekar announced the film in November 2022 on his Instagram, sharing a photo of himself with Dutta and Pradhan. Additionally, a more than one-minute-long title and cast announcement video was released on YouTube. The film's story is written by Alok Sutar and Navjyot Bandiwadekar, with the screenplay by Bandiwadekar, Sutar, and Vaibhav Chinchalkar. Dialogues are by Chinchalkar and Chaitanya Saindane.

Bhave and Deo reunited after over twenty years, having last appeared together in the successful 1998 political thriller film Sarkarnama. This film also marks Dutta's debut in Marathi cinema. The casting was handled by Rohan Mapuskar, Bandiwadekar mentioned that casting for the film was challenging due to bringing together such prominent names from the industry. Principal photography began in the first week of December 2022 and concluded in June 2023. The majority of the film was shot in the Konkan belt, primarily in Guhagar and Dabhol, with a few portions also filmed in Kochi, Kerala. The team celebrated with a grand wrap-up party attended by numerous notable celebrities from the Marathi industry.

== Soundtrack ==
The songs and background music for the film were composed by Sanket Sane, with lyrics written by Sameer Samant, Alok Sutar, and Shradha Sunket Dalvi. The songs were choreographed by Rahul Thombre. Javed Ali and Vishal Dadlani have also lent their voices to one of the songs in the film. On 19 September 2023, on the occasion of Ganesh Chaturthi, Bandiwadekar posted a video on his Instagram showcasing Ganesha along with a background song sung by Ali.

Track listing
No.	Title	Lyrics	Singer(s)	Length
1.	"Maza Konkan Bhari"	Shradha Dalvi	The Konkan Collective	2:35
2.	"Navasachi Gauri Mazi"	Sameer Samant	Abhay Jodhpurkar	4:34
3.	"Hey Pori"	Alok Sutar	Vishal Dadlani	4:11
4.	"Ganpati Aale"	Sameer Samant	Javed Ali	3:06
5.	"Vasarachi Aai"	Alok Sutar	Sayali Khare	3:56
Total length:				18:22

== Release and reception ==
On 30 April 2024, the release date was announced with a poster featuring the entire cast. The very next day, the makers released the first teaser introducing the film's star cast. On 21 June 2024, the first song titled "Maza Konkan Bhari" was released under the label of Panorama Music. The teaser launch event, attended by the cast and crew, occurred on 24 June. Prior to the teaser's debut, the team visited Mumbai's Siddhivinayak temple.

=== Critical reception ===
Gharat Ganpati was among the top six contenders being considered as Indian entry for Best International Feature Film at the 97th Academy Awards.
