= Kishor Kadam =

Indian actor

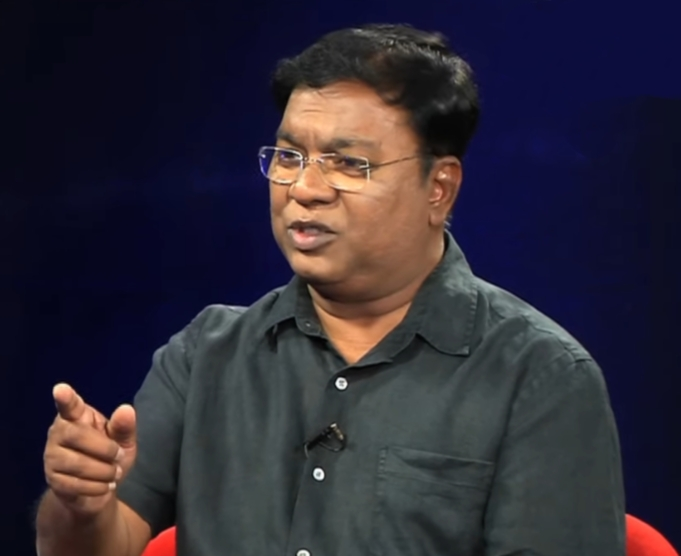
- Kadam in 2021
- Born: 9 November 1967 (age 58); Bombay (now Mumbai), Maharashtra, India
- Occupations: Actor; Poet
- Notable work: Special 26 (2013); Jhund (2022)

Kishor Kadam (born 9 November 1967) is an Indian actor and poet who has acted prominently in Marathi and Hindi movies. He has also acted in Tamil movies and has appeared in some television serials as well. He is a veteran Marathi poet, writing with his pseudonym 'Saumitra'. He is recipient of three Maharashtra State Film Awards, two Filmfare Awards Marathi, two Zee Chitra Gaurav Puraskar.

== Early life ==
Kadam was born and raised in Mumbai, Maharashtra, although his family's ancestral roots trace back to Ahmednagar district in Maharashtra. He grew up in a financially stable household, which allowed him to devote considerable time to developing his craft. He later recalled that, as his family had a home in Mumbai and did not place immediate pressure on him to earn a living, he was able to spend around 16 years studying under various teachers and developing his skills without having to face significant financial hardship. He graduated in commerce before pursuing a career in the performing arts. His training included an intensive period of study under theatre director and thespian Satyadev Dubey, with whom he worked and trained for approximately 12 years.

== Career ==
Kadam began his acting career in television with Shyam Benegal's historical television series Bharat Ek Khoj (1988), in which he played the role of Press Reporter Wagle. He made his Hindi film debut with Benegal's Antarnaad (1991), followed by Mammo (1994). He made his Marathi film debut with Limited Manuski (1994). In 1995, he portrayed Rama in Amol Palekar's Bangarwadi. He subsequently appeared in the Hindi film Is Raat Ki Subah Nahin (1996), in which he played Ganya.

In 1999, Kadam made his debut in an Urdu-language film with Samar, which won the National Film Award for Best Feature Film. In 2000, he portrayed Bhaskar Shetty in the Hindi film Dil Pe Mat Le Yaar!!. The same year, he appeared in the Marathi film Dhyaas Parva, for which he received the Maharashtra State Film Award for Best Actor. In 2004, Kadam portrayed ACP Dangle in Anurag Kashyap's Black Friday. He later appeared as Bhujang in the 2007 Hindi film Ek Chalis Ki Last Local. He returned to television with the Marathi television series Asambhav, which aired on Zee Marathi. In 2009, Kadam played a leading role in the critically acclaimed Marathi film Ek Cup Chya, directed by Sumitra Bhave–Sunil Sukthankar. The same year, he portrayed Yamnya in Jogwa, earning Zee Chitra Gaurav Puraskar for Best Supporting Actor. In 2010, he played Pandoba in Natarang, for which he received the Maharashtra State Film Award for Best Supporting Actor and Zee Chitra Gaurav Puraskar for Best Supporting Actor.

In 2011, Kadam portrayed a reporter in the critically acclaimed Marathi film Deool. He also appeared on television as Professor Nagesh Mahajan in the series Anolkhi Disha. His subsequent film credits included Ravi Jadhav's Balak-Palak (2013), Vanshvel (2013) and Special 26 (2013). In 2014, Kadam appeared in the Marathi film Nati, the English-language film Gandhi of the Month, and Nagraj Manjule's Fandry. His performance in Fandry earned him the Filmfare Award for Best Supporting Actor – Marathi. In 2015, he appeared in Partu, for which he received his second Filmfare Award for Best Supporting Actor – Marathi. Kadam made his Tamil film debut in 2017 with Theeran Adhigaaram Ondru. In 2019, he appeared in the Hindi films Section 375 and Albert Pinto Ko Gussa Kyoon Aata Hai?.

In 2021, Kadam returned to television with Zee Marathi's Kaay Ghadla Tya Ratri?, in which he portrayed the political character Rajan Parvate. In 2022, he appeared in Nagraj Manjule's Jhund. He was also associated with the films Godakaath and Awanchit, for which he received a National Film Award. In 2024, Kadam portrayed Tatya in Paani and Savant Karmarkar in Match Fixing. His 2025 credits included Jarann, in which he played Dr. Dhananjay Kulkarni, P. S. I. Arjun, in which he portrayed Chhabya, and Gondhal, in which he played Bhivaba. He also appeared in the ZEE5 web series Andhar Maya as Gonya. In 2026, Kadam appeared in the television series Matka King, portraying Prashant Bapat.

== Filmography ==
=== Films ===
Year	Film	Role	Notes
1991	Antarnaad	Shiva	Hindi debut
1994	Mammo	Agent Raju	
1994	Limited Manuski	Prakash	Marathi debut
1996	Sanshodhan	Saumitra	
1996	Is Raat Ki Subah Nahin	Ganya	
1997	Jayate	Kulkarni	
1998	Samar	Dalit Nathu	
2000	Dil Pe Mat Le Yaar!!	Bhaskar Shetty	
2000	Dhyaas Parva	Raghunath Dhondo Karve	Maharashtra State Film Award for Best Actor
2004	Pandhar		
2004	Black Friday	Inspector Bhaskar Dangle	
2004	Shobhyatra	Bal Gangadhar Tilak	
2007	Tahaan	Kishya	
2008	Contractor	Inspector Dara	
2008	Phoonk	Devappa	
2009	Samaantar	Dr. Nikumbh	
2009	Jogwa	Yamnya	Zee Chitra Gaurav Puraskar for Best Supporting Actor
2009	Ek Cup Chya	Kashinath Sawant	
2009	Mareparyant Phaashi	Jail Superintendent	
2010	Natarang	Pandoba	Maharashtra State Film Award for Best Supporting Actor
2010	Pratisaad: The Response	Sarjerao Patil	
2011	Shahanpan Dega Deva	Dr. Nair	
2011	Taryanche Bait	Insurance Agent	
2011	Balgandharva	Ganpatrao Bodas	
2011	Deool	Mahasangram	
2011	Paulwaat	Usman Bhai	
2012	Life Ki Toh Lag Gayi	Bhosale	
2012	Ha Bharat Maza	Baba	
2012	Bokad	Munim	
2013	Balak-Palak	Kadam	
2013	Special 26	Iqbal	
2013	Rela Re	Tribal Man	
2013	Tuhya Dharma Koncha	Baba	
2013	Parees	Politician	
2013	Touring Talkies	Raja Rangeela	
2013	Anumati	Ratnakar's friend	
2013	Fandry	Kachru Mane	Filmfare Award for Best Supporting Actor – Marathi
2013	Vanshvel	Dadasaheb	
2013	Rajjo	Dadi Patil	
2014	Postcard	James Kamble	
2014	Manjunath	Manjunath's father	
2014	Bhakar	Bhau	
2014	Anvatt	Saibu	
2014	Gandhi of the Month	Daniel	
2015	Aabhraan	Lakha	
2015	Siddhant	Teacher	
2015	Nilkanth Master	Raosaheb	
2015	Highway Ek Selfie Aarpar	Henpecked husband	
2015	Hero	Shantaram	
2015	Ganvesh	Madhu's father	
2015	Partu	Lakshman	Filmfare Award for Best Supporting Actor – Marathi
2015	Wagherya	Sarpanch	
2016	Chiranjeev	Keshav's uncle	
2016	Sarpanch Bhagirath	Shridhar	
2016	Reti	Kisan	
2016	Damlelya Babachi Kahani	Jagan Bhatkhande	
2016	Chaurya	Kishore	
2016	Ghantaa	Chintya Bhai	
2016	Anna	Appa	
2017	Zindagi Virat	Datta	
2017	Kaasav	Yadu	
2017	Idak: The Goat	Sarpanch	
2017	Theeran Adhigaaram Ondru	Haram Singh	Tamil debut
2017	Ek Maratha Lakh Maratha	Dattu	
2017	Pimpal	Tukaram	
2018	Gavthi	Gajya's father	
2018	Nude	Dean	
2018	Aa Bb Kk	Aajya	
2018	Black Bud	Inspector Kadam	
2019	Chhatrapati Shasan	Psycho	
2019	Albert Pinto Ko Gussa Kyoon Aata Hai?	Pramod Naik	
2019	Purushottam	Sangram Nimbalkar	
2019	Babo	Madan	
2019	Adham	Anna Bhosale	
2019	Dithee	Ramji	
2019	Section 375	Justice Madgaonkar	
2019	Man Udhan Vara	Sarita's uncle	
2019	Rom Com	Father	
2021	Avwanchhit	Madhusudan Gavhane	National Film Award – Special Mention (feature film)
2021	Jayanti	MLA Gondane	
2022	Soyrik	Manasi's father	
2022	Jhund	Football Coach	
2022	Avasaan	Sahebrao Karpe Patil	
2022	Operation Romeo	Kiran Patil	
2022	Dil, Dimag Aur Batti	Baban	
2022	Ghe Double	Bhau's friend	
2022	Har Har Mahadev	Tanoji	
2023	Ghar Banduk Biryani	MLA's PA	
2023	Territory	Daroga Jiddewar	
2024	Bastar: The Naxal Story	Rajendra Karma	
2024	Karmavirayan	Bhaurao Patil	
2024	Gadi	Saumitra	
2024	Paani	Tatya	
2025	Cineman	Anand	
2025	P. S. I. Arjun	Chhabya	
2025	Jarann	Dr. Dhananjay Kulkarni	
2025	Gondhal	Bhivaba	
2025	Match Fixing	Savant Karmarkar	
2026	Paach Futacha Bachchan	Ranga Maharaj	
2026	Hazaar Vela Sholay Pahilela Manus	TBA	

=== Television ===
Year	Serial Name	Character/Role	Channel	Language	Notes
1988	Bharat Ek Khoj	Press Reporter Wagle	DD National	Hindi	Episode No 48 Extremists and Moderates
2007	Asambhav	Yashwantrao Saranjame	Zee Marathi	Marathi	
2011	Anolkhi Disha	Professor Nagesh Mahajan	Star Pravah	Marathi	Episode 7 Patmora
2021	Kaay Ghadla Tya Ratri?	Politician Rajan Parvate	Zee Marathi	Marathi	Marathi
2025	Andhar Maya	Gonya	ZEE5	Marathi	
2025	Crime Beat	Pashupati	ZEE5	Hindi	
2026	Matka King	Prashant Bapat	Amazon Prime Video	Hindi	

== Awards ==
Kishor won critical acclaim for his performance in the lead role in Samar directed by Shyam Benegal, the film won the National Film Award for the best film in 1999. He also has acted in Natrang as Pandoba. In 2010 he won the Zee Gaurav Puraskar for best supporting actor and the Nilu Phule Sanman award.
