= Partu =

2015 Marathi-language film

- Directed by: Nitin Adsul
- Starring: Kishor Kadam; Smita Tambe; Navni Parihar; Saurabh Gokhale
- Cinematography: Sanjay Khanzode
- Edited by: Rajesh Rao
- Music by: Shashank Powar
- Release date: 4 December 2015
- Country: India
- Language: Marathi

Partu is a 2015 Indian Marathi-language film directed by Nitin Adsul starring Kishor Kadam, Smita Tambe, Navni Parihar, Yash Pandey and Saurabh Gokhale. Music by Shashank Powar. The film was theatrically released on 4 December 2015.

== Synopsis ==
A farmer and a child embark on a life-long journey.

== Cast ==
- Kishor Kadam
- Smita Tambe
- Navni Parihar
- Yash Pandey
- Saurabh Gokhale
- Gayatri Deshmukh
- Raja Bundela
- Ravi Bhushan Bhartiya
- Anshuman Vichare

== Soundtrack ==
Partu

Soundtrack album by Shashank Powar
- Released: 2015
- Genre: Feature film soundtrack
- Length: 19:18
- Language: Marathi
- Label: Video Palace

Official audio
- Partu – Full Album on YouTube

Track listing
No.	Title	Singer(s)	Length
1.	"Jeev Pisatala"	Jasraj Jayant Joshi	4:08
2.	"Ghotala Ghotala Zala"	Janvi Prabhu Arora	4:21
3.	"Kon Kuthla"	Shankar Mahadevan	6:50
4.	"Rajaji"	Manish Rajgire, Shikha Ajmera	4:39
Total length:			19:18

== Critical response ==
Partu film received mixed reviews from critics. Mihir Bhanage of The Times of India gave the film a rating of 2.5/5 and wrote "These veer the film away from its main focus and once that happens, there’s no getting back on track. The slow pace makes the acting efforts of the cast go in vain". Ganesh Matkari of Pune Mirror wrote "It suddenly makes the film more palatable, a pleasant reminder that even when things are going wrong, there always exists a possibility for the happy ending we all deserve". Soumitra Pote of Maharashtra Times gave the film 3 stars out of 5 and wrote "Overall, this fact is really shocking. But humanity is constantly glorified by this". Gurav Chaitali of Loksatta wrote "This story of two ordinary families takes many turns in the course of time, but creates a unique vision of humanity".

== Accolades ==
Awards	Year	Category	Result	References
ISAFF	2015	Best Film	Won	
