= 8 Don 75 =

2024 Indian film by Sushrut Bhagwat

- Directed by: Sushrut Bhagwat
- Written by: Sharvani Pillai; Sushrut Bhagwat; Sanjay Mone
- Produced by: Vikas Hande; Lokesh Mangade; Sudhir Kolte
- Starring: Shubhankar Tawde; Sanskruti Balgude; Sanjay Mone; Anand Ingale; Pushkar Shrotri
- Cinematography: Yogesh Rajguru
- Edited by: Rajesh Rao
- Music by: Avadhoot Gupte; Adwait Patwardhan
- Production company: Uddaharnarth Nirmit
- Release date: 19 January 2024
- Country: India
- Language: Marathi

8 Don 75, Fakta Ichchhashakti Havi! (transl. 8 Don 75, All it takes is willpower!) is a 2024 Indian Marathi-language drama film co-written and directed by Sushrut Bhagwat. Produced by Vikas Hande, Lokesh Mangade and Sudhir Kolte under Uddaharnarth Nirmit. The film stars Shubhankar Tawde, Sanskruti Balgude, Sanjay Mone, Sharvari Pillaai and Pushkar Shrotri. The songs were composed by Avadhoot Gupte. The story revolves around the rare subject of body donation.

The film was officially announced in November 2020. The principal photography started in December 2020 and ended in February 2021 during the COVID-19 pandemic in India. The film had its theatrical release on 19 January 2024.

== Plot ==
In a small village in Maharashtra, this is the story of Ramchandra alias Anna Moghe, the son of Kirwant, Amol. Amol, the son of Anna's first wife. Amol's mother died when he was eight or ten years old. In the form of Vatsala in the house, a new home came to the house. As Amol got older, he became obsessed with Vatsala and stopped talking to Vatsala . He started talking less to her as much as he could. This family had a tradition. In fact, this was the problem of this family. Ramchandra Moghe, that is, Anna had to become Kirwant because of the promise he made to his mother. Kirwant Anna Moghe was the third generation in this family. Amol's situation was similar. He decided to become a doctor because of his promise to his mother. Mukund alias Nanu Kulkarni was the fourth angle in the triangular family of Amol, Anna and Vatsala . Around the villages, there was a single shop selling material for last rituals, which was owned by Nanu .Since the last three generations they have been in the business of supplementing each other. Anna was waiting for the results of Amol's 12 th and NEET exams. One day a photoshoot was going on in the village and it was there that Amol saw the Kavita for the first time. From that day onwards, Kavita was all over Amol's mind and within a week, the results of Class XII in the state followed by the results of NEET examinations. Anna talked to Nanu Kulkarni and admitted Amol to a newly started ayurvedic medical college.

Kavita, eldest daughter of MLA Bhaurao Tare. Although Kavita is on the college campus, Bhaurao had set up the college along with Nirmalatai Indurkar on the condition that she should become a doctor. Amol, Kavita is the first batch of this college. With the exception of one and two like Kavita in Resident College, everyone was staying in a hostel on the college campus. College, education started. Nikhil Devrukhkar was elected unopposed as this year's University Student Representative. Along with education, different world of college, hostel, fun and the love triangle of Kavita Amol Sandhya also started. Everything was going well. Love and education go hand in hand, happily rejoicing with each other and in fact one day..... Nikhil went on strike in college. College, lectures all closed. The reason was that there was no cadaver in the college. A cadaver was one important thing which every medical student needed for education. Amol was upset and was in tension with these happenings and strike. He spends most of his time thinking about how he will fulfil his promise to his mother. The aggression of the children's movement begins to grow.

One day Nirmalatai comes to the college and announces that the college will provide free education to the boy who will arrange the cadaver for the college and a competition for arranging the cadaver among the children begins. Amol thinks that he can easily arrange a cadaver, in simple words, a dead body. Since Amol's father is Kirwant, this seemingly easy task becomes more difficult because he is Kirwant. How does every boy in College arrange cadaver i.e. dead body? What does everyone do for that? After all, who can arranges a cadaver? Whose education was declared free? This film is definitely a roller coaster ride of emotions, comedy, drama with a tinge of social message.

== Cast ==
- Shubhankar Tawde as Amol Moghe
- Sanskruti Balgude as Kavita
- Sanjay Mone as Bhaurao Tare
- Pushkar Shrotri
- Anand Ingale as Ramchandra Moghe alias Anna
- Sharvani Pillai as Vatsala
- Nikhil Rajeshirke as Nikhil Devrukhkar
- Radhika Harshe Vidyasagar as Nirmalatai Joglekar (College chairman)
- Shubhangi Damle as Kavita's grandmother
- Vijay Patwardhan as Nanu Kulkarni
- Seema Kulkarni
- Aayushi Bhave
- Chinmay Sant
- Swapnil Kanase
- Ashwini Kulkarni as Moon Moon madame
- Kirtankar Charudatta Aapale
- Vaibhav Mahale
- Vishal Duraphe
- Shreeshail Shelar
- Krushna Bolu
- Siddharth Wagh
- Viraj Tilekar
- Trupti Phadtare
- Sakshi Thopte
- Anushka Pimputkar
- Akshay Mitkal
- Aniket Pote
- Akshay Dhawade
- Shreyas Indapurkar
- Deepa Oak Savargaonkar
- Mayank Ashutosh Hinge
- Rujula Nilesh Dhond

== Production ==
8 Don 75 was officially announced on 19 November 2020 through the title poster. In December 2020, the Mahurat clap was given by Maharashtra Navnirman Sena (MNS) president Raj Thackeray in Pune. The principal photography took place in Pune during the COVID-19 pandemic in India from December 2020 to February 2021. Tawde completed his schedule at the end of January 2021, while Balgude wrapped up her shoot in the second week of February 2021.

== Soundtrack ==
The background score is done by Adwait Patwardhan.

No.	Title	Lyrics	Music	Singer(s)	Length
1.	"Enjoy Enjoy"	Ganesh Nigade	Suhit Abhyankar	Adarsh Shinde; Suhit Abhyankar	3:13
2.	"Kasa Sangayacha Asata"	Vaibhav Joshi	Avadhoot Gupte	Mugdha Karhade	3:27
Total length:					6:40

== Release and reception ==
The first teaser for the film was released on 24 February 2021. The official theatrical release date was announced in October 2023 with the poster. The trailer was released nine days prior to its release.
