= Teja Devkar =

Indian actress

Tejaa Deokar
- Born: Mumbai, Maharashtra
- Occupation: Actress
- Years active: 2005–present
- Parents: Suresh Devkar (father); Neeta Devkar (mother)
- Relatives: Surya Devkar (sister)

Tejaa Devkar (also spelled Deokar) is an Indian actress who has acted in Marathi language television series and films.

== Early life ==
Tejaa was born to Suresh and Neeta Deokar in Mumbai, and she has done her doctorate in English Literature. Suresh is a businessman in Mumbai, and Neeta has produced a couple of Marathi films.

== Acting career ==
Tejaa has worked in many Marathi movies and is associated with many serials aired on different channels. She has won many awards in various categories.

She began her career in 2005 with the Marathi movie Hirwa Kunku, a family drama that did well at the box office, especially in the remote places in Maharashtra. She has acted in many other Marathi movies including Oxygen, Dharpakad, Khandaobacha Lagin, Raadhika, Shambhu Majha Navsacha, Natee and Adla Badli. In Dharpakad she played a kabaddi sportsman, in Khandobacha Lagin she played an adivasi girl, in Shambhu Majha Navsacha she played a negative role, whereas in Adla Badla she played a comic role. In Neeta Devkar's Oxygen, she played a housewife.

== Filmography ==
Year	Film	Role	Notes
2006	Hirwa Kunku	Gouri	Debut
2006	Shambhu Maza Navsacha		
2006	Maa Shakambharicha Mahima	Satakshi	
2006	Sasarchi Ka Maherchi		
2007	Karz Kunkavache		
2007	Mahercha Daivat		
2008	Aar Aar Aaba Aata Tari Thamba	Sayili	
2008	Adla Badli		
2010	Chal Dhar Pakad	Rama	
2010	Mulga		
2010	Oxygen		
2011	Tuch Khari Gharchi Lakshmi		
2013	Nati	Sulakshana Shinde/Resham	
2013	Raadhika		
2013	Boom Boom Bajirav		
2013	Topiwale Kavale		
2014	Bharla Malwat Rakhtaana	Lakshmi	
2014	May Mauli Manudevi		
2015	Sasu Cha Swayamwar	Nandini Dekhne	
2015	Nazar		
2016	Marathi Tigers		
2016	1234		
2017	Zala Bobhata	Rani Saheb	
2017	Thank You Vitthala		
2018	Pani Bani		
2019	Saint Nerry Marathi Medium		
2019	Khandobacha Lagin		
2019	Unch Bharari		
2023	Khel Tamasha		
2023	Jaavai Maazha Navasacha		

== Television ==
Year	Title	Role	Channel
	May Lek		ETV Marathi
	Ek Zhunj Vadalashi		ETV Marathi
	Chimanipankh		DD Sahyadri
2016	Kulswamini		Star Pravah
2021	Vrundavan	Kartiki	Mi Marathi
2023	Amchi Mumbai		TV Series
