= Chal Dhar Pakad =

- Directed by: Aatmaram Dharne
- Produced by: Neeta Laad
- Starring: Nirmiti Sawant; Nagesh Bhosle, Priya Arun, Teja Devkar, Megha Ghadge
- Cinematography: Shyam Chauhan
- Edited by: Saneel Kokate
- Music by: Devidas Parab
- Distributed by: Everest Entertainment Pvt. Ltd.
- Release date: 6 December 2010
- Country: India
- Language: Marathi

Chal Dhar Pakad is a Marathi sports drama film released on 6 December 2010. Produced by Neeta Laad and directed by Aatmaram Dharne, the film stars Nirmiti Sawant, Nagesh Bhosle, Priya Berde, Teja Devkar, and Megha Ghadge. The film's music is by Devidas Parab.

The films is about a woman's fight for self-respect and rights.

== Plot ==
Somewhere in Maharashtra is Vaitagwadi, a small lost village. The village is under serious financial issues, it has a school but no chalks for the black board, there is a Dispensary but no doctors, villagers have land but in the name of Bhujangrao Patil.

Character named Bhujangrao Patil is very passionate about the game of Kabaddi, for which the entire village is under the sage of fear. If any one dares to go against him or refuses to obey his orders, Bhujangrao Patil declares a game of Kabaddi to an ill-fated result.

Bhujangrao Patil's wife Komal used to have the slimmest body before she got married. Today, Bhujangrao has replaced Komal with Champa as he hates even the sight of his obese wife. To regain her self-respect and her rights, Komal takes a vow to challenge and defeat Bhujangrao in the game he is so proud of, Kabaddi.

== Cast ==
- Nirmiti Sawant
- Nagesh Bhosle
- Priya Berde
- Teja Devkar
- Megha Ghadge
- Sanjay Kasbekar
- Hemlata Bane

== Crew ==
- Director - Aatmaram Dharne
- Producer - Neeta Laad
- Cinematographer - Shyam Chauhan
- Art Director - Amar More
- Music Director - Devidas Parab
- Lyricist - Subod Pawar

== Soundtrack ==
The music has been directed by Devidas Parab, while the lyrics have been provided by Subod Pawar.

=== Track listing ===
No.	Title	Length
1.	"Ishquachi Kheluya Kabbadi"	5:34
2.	"Dhar Dhar Pakad"	3:04
3.	"Sakhi Maitrani"	5:14
