= Like Aani Subscribe =

2024 Marathi murder mystery film

- Theatrical release poster
- Directed by: Abhishek Merukar
- Written by: Abhishek Merukar
- Produced by: Nitin Vaidya; Abhishek Merukar
- Starring: Amey Wagh; Amruta Khanvilkar; Shubhankar Tawde; Vitthal Kale; Jui Bhagwat
- Cinematography: Gaurav Kulkarni
- Edited by: Aniket Kale
- Music by: Score: Suyash Kelkar; Songs: Amitraj; Suyash Kelkar
- Production companies: Nitin Vaidya Productions; Abhishek Merukar Productions; Alphaneon Studios
- Distributed by: Panorama Studios
- Release dates: 13 October 2024 (Singapore); 18 October 2024 (India)
- Running time: 142 minutes
- Country: India
- Language: Marathi

Like Aani Subscribe (transl. Like and subscribe) is a 2024 Indian Marathi-language suspense-thriller film written and directed by Abhishek Merukar, and produced by Merukar and Nitin Vaidya under the banners of Abhishek Merukar Productions and Nitin Vaidya Productions. The film stars Amey Wagh, Amruta Khanvilkar and debutant Jui Bhagwat in the lead roles, while Vitthal Kale, Shubhankar Tawde, Rajasi Bhave and Pushkaraj Chirputkar plays pivotal roles. The story follows a youth-centric narrative set in the world of social media, where a vlogger accidentally captures a dead body on camera, leading to a chain of events that entangles other characters as they seek to uncover the truth behind the incident.

The film premiered in Singapore on 13 October 2024, before its theatrical release in India on 18 October 2024. Upon release the film received favourable views from the critics and audience, especially for its plot, performances and direction. Jui Bhagwat won Filmfare Award Marathi for Best Female Debut.

== Cast ==
- Amey Wagh as Rohidas Chavan aka Rohit
- Amruta Khanvilkar as Deepika
- Jui Bhagwat as Khushi
- Shubhankar Tawde as Ravi
- Vitthal Kale as Faisal
- Virat Madake as Inspector Sandeep Inamdar
- Rajasi Bhave as Shruti
- Pushkaraj Chirputkar as Varun
- Shivraj Waichal as Bipin
- Shrikant Yadav as Dadasaheb
- Gautami Patil as the dancer in the item number "Limbu Firawla"

== Production ==
Like Aani Subscribe was officially announced on 15 July 2024, with the release of a short video featuring the tagline, "Are you searching... Who is Rohit Chauhan?" Jui Bhagwat, who previously appeared in the Marathi show Tumchi Mulgi Kay Karte?, makes her feature film debut through this film. Additionally, dancer Gautami Patil has also featured in an item song.

Director Merukar drew inspiration from a strange story he had come across on Twitter, which led him to begin working on the script in 2021. Discussing the film's genre, he remarked, "As a viewer, I felt that filmmakers were not delivering good films, especially when the audience is so knowledgeable, and the actors are incredibly talented." Speaking about the casting, Merukar shared that Bhagwat was chosen through auditions, Wagh was his first choice for the film, and regarding Amruta Khanvilkar, he expressed that her potential had not been fully utilized by filmmakers in the past, so she was selected based on the specific criteria he envisioned for the role. As for Patil's song, several names were considered, but she was ultimately chosen due to her strong fan base. Wagh revealed that rehearsals for the song were completed within four days; he took three and a half days, while Patil only needed half a day to rehearse.

== Soundtrack ==
The soundtrack for the film is composed by Amitraj and Suyash Kelkar, with Kelkar also scoring the background music. The first single, titled "Limbu Firawala," an item song featuring Wagh and Patil, was released on 8 September 2024. The second song, "Upload Karun Tak," which focuses on a youth-oriented theme and showcases the daily activities of Bhagwat's character, Khushi, as she vlogs about them, was released on 24 September 2024. The next two songs were released some days after the movie was released. The third song, "Firki," was released on 25 October 2024 and the fourth and the last song "Afra Tafri," was released on 16 November 2024.

Track listing
No.	Title	Lyrics	Singer(s)	Length
1.	"Limbu Firawla"	Kshitij Patwardhan	Vaishali Samant, Ravindra Khomne	3:54
2.	"Upload Karun Tak"	Kshitij Patwardhan	Kasturi Wavre	4:30
3.	"Afra Tafri"	Valay Mulgund	Swapnil Kulkarni	2:42
4.	"Firki"	Valay Mulgund	Nupoora Niphadkar	2:50
Total length:				13:56

== Marketing and release ==
The poster featuring the three main leads was unveiled on 26 August 2024, along with the announcement of the release date. The poster showcased a selfie of the trio, highlighting a stark contrast between their cheerful poses and their real facial expressions. A short teaser, lasting less than a minute, was released on 12 September. On 3 October, coinciding with the auspicious occasion of Ghatasthapana (the first day of Navratri), the makers launched the film's trailer. An extended trailer followed on 14 October 2024. Prior to that, the film had its premiere on 13 October in Singapore, where it received an overwhelming response from the audience.

== Reception ==
=== Critical response ===
The film received mostly positive reviews for the cast's acting performance, the screenplay and especially for the storyline, which was lauded for its dark humor.

Sameer Ahire of Movie Talkies rated the film 3 out of 5 stars, commending its unpredictable twist, strong performances, and social commentary. He noted, "Jui shines in the emotional Instagram Live scene, and Amruta impresses in her mature role. The second half picks up with a clever twist, but the first half's pacing and forced subplots could have been tighter." Despite some flaws, he regarded the film as a rare and refreshing thriller in Marathi cinema. Santosh Bhingarde of E-Sakal gave Like Aani Subscribe 3.5 stars out of 5, describing it as a "well woven story" and added, "Merukar has given good turns and twists while presenting the story which makes the film engaging till the end." Saurabh More of itsMajja.com also praised the film, acknowledging its slow first half but noting that it gained momentum after the interval. "Wagh easefully painted the dual roles, Khanvilkar does justice to her character and Bhagwat also impresses in her debut," he remarked. Regarding the direction, he commented, "Merukar’s has done a good job in portraying the reality of social media," while giving the film 3 stars. Nandini Ramnath of Scroll.in criticized the film's length, writing that "..too much time is spent on setting up scenes and elaborating on the already obvious. The first-film jitters includes some grace notes. The dark humour lands on target, as do the performances."

Kalpeshraj Kubal of Maharashtra Times rated the film 3 out of 5 stars, appreciating its screenwriting, performances, direction, and cinematography. He noted, "The movie has successfully tried to show the dark side behind the glittering world of social media," concluding that "The plot of everyday life and the good acting of the actors make the movie really attract attention." Sanjay Ghavre of Lokmat Filmy also rated the film 3 stars out of 5, praising the dramatic twists that heighten the excitement and remarked, "Abhishek's success as a writer is that even though the murderer is always in front of his eyes, he is not suspected." Reshma Raikwar of Loksatta described the film as a "fresh and innovative story," stating, "When a completely new story is constructed and presented to the audience in the form of a film, keeping in touch with today's times and with reference to things related to daily life, its uniqueness is definitely noticeable." Saurav Mahind of Urbanly, gave 2.5 out of 5 stars, commenting that "while the plot twist adds intrigue but lacks a strong impact, leaving some questions unanswered."

=== Accolades ===
Year	Award	Category	Nominee (s)	Result	Ref.
2025	MaTa Sanman	Best Supporting Actress	Jui Bhagwat	Nominated	
2025	MaTa Sanman	Best Editing	Aniket Kale	Nominated	
2025	Filmfare Marathi Awards	Best Female Debut	Jui Bhagwat	Won	
2026	Maharashtra State Film Awards	Best Choreography	Rahul Thombre	Nominated	
