= Sarpanch Bhagirath =

2016 Marathi-language fim

- Directed by: Ramdas Phutane
- Produced by: Shivkumar Lad
- Starring: Upendra Limaye; Veena Jamkar; Mohan Agashe; Kishor Kadam
- Cinematography: Charudatt Dukhande
- Edited by: Sarvesh Parab
- Music by: Sambhaji Bhagat
- Release date: 4 March 2016
- Country: India
- Language: Marathi

Sarpanch Bhagirath is an Indian Marathi language film directed by Ramdas Phutane and produced by Shivkumar Lad. The film stars Upendra Limaye, Veena Jamkar, Mohan Agashe and Kishor Kadam. Music by Sambhaji Bhagat. The film was released on 4 March 2016.

== Synopsis ==
The story of how caste politics is played in rural areas is presented. As the sarpanch post of the village is reserved, Bhagirath becomes an OBC youth sarpanch with the help of a leader. The story is about how he has to face the situation, political pressure, caste politics and how he finds a way out of it.

== Cast ==
- Upendra Limaye As Sarpanch Bhagirath Girme
- Veena Jamkar As Bhagirath Wife Rahi
- Mohan Agashe As Sada Kaka
- Kishor Kadam As Bhagirath Friend Shridhar
- Swarangi Marathe As Salma
- Savita Malpekar As Yamuna Tai

== Production ==
Principal photography began on 7 December 2012.

== Soundtrack ==
Sarpanch Bhagirath

Soundtrack album by Sambhaji Bhagat
- Released: 2013
- Recorded: 2013
- Genre: Feature film soundtrack
- Length: 18:11
- Language: Marathi

Official audio
- Sarpanch Bhagirath – Full Album on YouTube

Track listing
No.	Title	Singer(s)	Length
1.	"Ana Baya Pahatechya Ga Pari"	Sambhaji Bhagat	4:23
2.	"Andharalya Dhahi Disha"	Chandan Kamble	2:42
3.	"Mati Uphanalyavar"	Sandeep Ubale	1:39
4.	"Shivraya Re Gandhi Baba"	Sambhaji Bhagat	3:06
5.	"Kasa Ra Dada Jaticha Hyo Kila"	Anand Shinde	4:05
6.	"Kesari Fani Ga Maina"	Mira Umap	2:56
Total length:			18:11

== Critical response ==
Sarpanch Bhagirath received mixed reviews from critics. Ganesh Matkari of Pune Mirror wrote"The film ends rather abruptly at a point more suitable as an intermission rather than climax, and much remains unsaid and unresolved". Soumitra Pote of Maharashtra Times gave the film 3 stars out of 5 and wrote "Though the chosen subject matter is important, the directorial grip seems to be loosened at many places. That's probably why even after the end of the movie, something remains".
