= Nati (film) =

- Directed by: Yogesh Jaadhav
- Produced by: Nita Deokar
- Starring: Teja Devkar; Ajinkya Deo; Subodh Bhave; Priya Arun; Kishor Kadam; Kishori Shahane; Shashank Shende
- Cinematography: Suresh Deshmane
- Release date: 19 September 2014
- Country: India
- Language: Marathi

Nati (Marathi: नटी), (meaning: Actress) is a Marathi film directed by Yogesh Jaadhav, inspired by Bollywood actress Jiah Khan's suicide.

Nati was produced by Nita Deokar, with actress Teja Devkar in lead role.

== Cast ==
- Teja Devkar as Sulakshana Shinde/Resham
- Subodh Bhave as Amit Kumar
- Ajinkya Deo as Mahesh Chandorkar
- Kishori Shahane
- Kishor Kadam as Pratap Shinde
- Shashank Shende
- Neha Joshi as Monica
- Nagesh Bhosale as Umaji Shinde

== Production ==
The movie was shot in the locales of India. It depicts the life of an actress, her rise and fall in fame.

== Soundtrack ==
No.	Title	Singer(s)	Length
1.	"Mee Natee"	Asha Bhosle
2.	"Hur Hur Hee"	Javed Ali, Neha Rajpal
3.	"Chatak Matak"	Anand Shinde, Neha Rajpal
