= Youngraad =

- Directed by: Makarand Mane
- Written by: Makarand Mane
- Screenplay by: Makarand Mane; Shashank Shende; Aziz Madari
- Produced by: Vitthal Patil; Gautam Gupta; Gaurav Gupta; Madhu Mantena
- Starring: Chaitanya Deore; Shireen Patil; Jeevan Karalkar; Saurabh Padvi; Shiv Wagh; Sharad Kelkar; Shashank Shende; Vitthal Patil; Savita Prabhune; Monika Chaudhari; Shantanu Gangane
- Cinematography: Hari Nair
- Edited by: Aashay Gatade
- Music by: Hriday Gattani; Gandhaar
- Production company: Phantom Films
- Distributed by: Reliance Entertainment
- Release date: 6 July 2018
- Country: India
- Language: Marathi

Youngraad is a 2018 Marathi coming of age film directed by Makrand Mane and produced by Phantom Films. Set in Nasik, the film chronicles the life of four youngsters. The film's official trailer was launched on 19 June 2018 and the film was released theatrically on 6 July 2018.

== Cast ==
- Vitthal Patil as Bhallal Bhau
- Chaitanya Deore as Vikya
- Jeevan Karalkar as Bappa
- Saurabh Padvi as Antya
- Shiv Wagh as Monya
- Shireen Patil as Teju
- Sharad Kelkar as Senapati
- Shashank Shende as Naamdev Chavan
- Savita Prabhune as Suryavanshi Bai
- Monika Chaudhari as Jyoti
- Shantanu Gangane

== Plot ==
A story of coming of age in a regular low income middle-class family in India; of vain attempts to swim against the tide; of desperately trying to find a way out once you find yourself being carried by the flow.

== Music ==
No.	Title	Lyrics	Music	Singer(s)	Length
1.	"Vay Youngraad Jhalay"	Kshitij Patwardhan	Hriday Gattani	Hriday Gattani
2.	"Saye"	Kshitij Patwardhan	Hriday Gattani	Hriday Gattani, Shashaa Tirupati
3.	"Goth Ramachi"	Datta Patil	Hriday Gattani	Shankar Mahadevan
