= Bittersweet (2020 film) =

2020 Indian film

- Poster
- Directed by: Anant Mahadevan
- Produced by: Suchhanda ChatterjeeM; Shubha Shetty
- Starring: Akshaya Gurav
- Cinematography: Alphonse Roy
- Edited by: Anant Mahadevan
- Music by: Rohit Kulkarni
- Release date: 20 November 2020
- Country: India
- Language: Marathi

Bittersweet is a 2020 Indian Marathi-language drama film directed by Anant Mahadevan. The film premiered at the Busan International Film Festival.

== Plot ==
Saguna, 22, arrives along with several sugarcane cutters to work in the sugarcane fields in Beed. She is determined to work hard and help her father repay his debt. When she misses work for three days due to menstruation, she is fined heavily. She is advised to undergo a hysterectomy so that her work doesn't stop. She is shocked to learn that this is a commonly followed practice among sugarcane cutters. It's a situation Suguna and her fellow women cutters can neither avoid nor escape.

== Cast ==
- Akshaya Gurav as Saguna
- Suresh Vishwakarma as Mr Nagarkar
- Smita Tambe
- Anil Nagarkar as Karande
- Guru Thakur
- Asit Redij

== Reception ==
A critic from Screen Daily wrote that "But while Mr Nagarkar is able to make a difference in Saguna’s life, the film ultimately paints a bleak picture for the other powerless women who depend on this gruelling work for survival". A critic from The Times of India wrote that "So, if you are looking for a feel-good film to wash off the lockdown hangover, 'Bittersweet' may not be your best bet. But if meaningful cinema is on your agenda, Ananth Mahadevan’s film could be just what you needed".
