= Jayanti (film) =

2021 film directed by Shailesh Narwade

- Directed by: Shailesh Narwade
- Written by: Shailesh Narwade
- Starring: Ruturaj Wankhede; Titeeksha Tawde
- Cinematography: Yogesh M Koli
- Edited by: Rohan Patil
- Music by: Mangesh Dhakde; Ruhi
- Production company: Meliorist Film Studio
- Distributed by: Sunshine Studios
- Release date: 12 November 2021
- Running time: 143 minutes
- Country: India
- Language: Marathi

Jayanti (transl. "The Birth Anniversary") is a 2021 Indian Marathi-language social drama film directed by Shailesh Narwade and produced by Meliorist Film Studio. The film starring Ruturaj Wankhede, Titeeksha Tawde and Milind Shinde and was theatrically released on 12 November 2021 in around 150 screens across Maharashtra and a few cities in other states.

Jayanti was released digitally on 12 July 2022 and is available for streaming on Amazon Prime Video in Marathi and Hindi, with English subtitles.

== Plot ==
Santya, also known as Santosh, is a directionless young man who is manipulated by MLA Gondane. He holds a misguided notion of being a "soldier of Shivaji". His outlook changes after an Adivasi woman from his neighbourhood, whom he considers his sister, is raped and electrocuted by a wealthy businessman, Vikas Kukreja. Santya approaches Gondane for help in seeking justice, but the MLA, with Santya's involvement, suppresses the case in exchange for money. During the anniversary celebrations of Dr. B. R. Ambedkar, Santya attempts to propose to Pallavi, who publicly rejects him and criticises his lack of knowledge about Chhatrapati Shivaji Maharaj and Dr. Ambedkar, whose anniversaries are being commemorated. Shattered and intoxicated, Santya attempts to attack Kukreja but is overpowered and arrested. While in prison, he undergoes a transformation, and after his release, he becomes a successful businessman.

== Cast ==
- Ruturaj Wankhede as Santya aka Santosh
- Titeeksha Tawde as Pallavi
- Milind Shinde as Ashok Mali
- Kishor Kadam as MLA Gondane
- Anjali Joglekar as Vatsala
- Vira Sathidar as Shrikant Mogre
- Amar Upadhyay as Vikas Kukreja
- Pandharinath Kamble as Dinesh Sathe
- Atul Mahale as Shambhu
- Saurabh Biramwar as Rahul
- Shubham Gautam as Shubham
- Akashay Khobragade as Chhotu
- Chetan Gadbail as Surya
- Pushpak Bhat as Rafiq
- Sneha Khandare as Safina
- Vibha Gajbhiye as Vandana
- Chetan Wagh as Munna
- Abhilash Yadav as Gajju
- Pranay Karande as IT Executive

== Soundtrack ==
Jayanti

Soundtrack album by Ruhi and Mangesh Dhakde
- Released: 26 October 2021
- Recorded: 2021
- Genre: Feature film soundtrack
- Length: 18:22
- Language: Marathi
- Label: Zee Music Company

Official audio
- Jayanti - Full Album on YouTube

The soundtrack was composed by Ruhi and Mangesh Dhakde. The "Tula Vandnyachi", sung by Javed Ali, was released in October 2021.

No.	Title	Lyrics	Music	Singer(s)	Length
1.	"Tula Kaay Sangu Kalena"	Vaibhav Choudhari	Ruhi	Javed Ali, Senjuti Das	4.22
2.	"Tujhi Loveship Deshil Ka"	Guru Thakur	Mangesh Dhakde	Suhas Sawant	3.25
3.	"Tula Vandnyachi"	Keshav Gajbhiye	Ruhi	Javed Ali	4.37
4.	"Bhimsainika"	Keshav Gajbhiye	Ruhi	Vikrant Bhartiya	5.58
Total length:					18:22

== Release and reception ==
Jayanti was the first Marathi feature film to release in cinema halls after COVID-19-related lockdown. The film started slow but got momentum in the third and fourth week due to word of mouth and completed 50 days in theatres. After watching the film, thousands of people took to social media to express their liking for the film. A few shows were also organized in United States of America, United Kingdom, Australia and Canada. The film had a week's theatrical run in Kuwait.

=== Critical response ===
Mihir Bhange of The Times of India said Jayanti is a story of human emotions and it conveys it convincingly.

Yogesh Pawar wrote in The Fress Press Journal that it's a Jayanti of solutions!

Yogesh Maitreya wrote in News9Live that Shailesh Narwade's Jayanti is a spiritual successor to Nagraj Manjule's Fandry.

Harish Wankhede wrote in The Quint that Jayanti is a much-needed story in a world of upper-class heroes.
