= Funral =

- Promotional release poster
- Directed by: Vivek Dubey
- Written by: Ramesh Maruti Dighe
- Produced by: Ramesh Maruti Dighe
- Starring: Aroh Welankar; Vijay Kenkare; Pramatai Sakhardande; Sambhaji Bhagat
- Cinematography: Anurag Solanki
- Edited by: Nilesh Navnath Gavand
- Music by: Advait Nemlekar
- Production company: Before After Entertainment
- Distributed by: Panorama Studios
- Release date: 14 June 2022
- Country: India
- Language: Marathi

Funral is a 2022 Indian Marathi-language film directed by Vivek Dubey. Written and produced by Ramesh Maruti Dighe under the banner of Before After Entertainment, Funral won the "Best Film on Social Issues" award at the 68th National Film Awards.

== Cast ==
- Aroh Welankar
- Vijay Kenkare
- Prematai Sakhardande
- Sambhaji Bhagat
- Uday Nirgutkar
- Harshad Shinde
- Siddhesh Pujare
- Parth Gatge
- Tanvi Barve
- Ajit Kelkar
- Upendra Date

== Production ==
Ramesh Dighe started writing the script in 2014 selections from his own life experiences, dedicated to friend Hira, director Dubey said that the project started in 2019 and most of the shooting was completed before the COVID-19 lockdown in India came into force, but it hampered his dubbing and sound score work.

== Reception ==
The Mihir Bhanage of The Times of India wrote "Funral is heartfelt story that cultminates in a very nicely written climax. Though it falls short in the technical aspects, the emotion it conveys is universal and for that, it deserves a watch". Keyur Seta of Cinestaan given 2 out of 5 stars and said "Funral gives the feel and atmosphere of a chawl life and screenplay is looks like serious yet light-hearted way. The film conveys a philosophical message around death in a simple manner. But for some strange reason, while Funral has its heart in the right place, the film feels like an incomplete journey".
