= Albert Pinto Ko Gussa Kyoon Aata Hai? (2019 film) =

2019 Indian Hindi-language film by Soumitra Ranade

Albert Pinto Ko Gussa Kyun Aata Hai?
- Theatrical release poster
- Directed by: Soumitra Ranade
- Written by: Soumitra Ranade
- Produced by: Soumitra Ranade; TempleTree Motion Pictures; PaperBoat Design Studios
- Starring: Manav Kaul; Nandita Das; Saurabh Shukla; Kishor Kadam; Omkar Das Manikpuri
- Cinematography: Rahul De
- Edited by: Aarti Bajaj
- Music by: Avishek Majumder
- Production companies: TempleTree Motion Pictures; PaperBoat Design Studios
- Release date: 12 April 2019
- Running time: 94 minutes
- Country: India
- Language: Hindi

Albert Pinto Ko Gussa Kyun Aata Hai? (transl. What Makes Albert Pinto Angry?) is a 2019 Indian Hindi-language crime drama film written, co-produced and directed by Soumitra Ranade. Inspired by the 1980 film of the same name by Saeed Akhtar Mirza, the film stars Manav Kaul as Albert Pinto and Nandita Das, Saurabh Shukla, Kishor Kadam and Omkar Das Manikpuri in the lead and supporting roles. It was premiered at the Singapore South Asian Film Festival and was released theatrically in India on 12 April 2019.

== Cast ==
- Manav Kaul as Albert Pinto
- Nandita Das as Stella D'Costa
- Saurabh Shukla as Nayyar
- Yusuf Hussain as Jeffery Pinto
- Kishor Kadam as Pramod Naik
- Omkar Das Manikpuri

== Reception ==
The Economic Times wrote: "Ranade never goes overboard with the subject, but he has an idea of its seriousness and effectively portrays the growing anger inside an ordinary middle-class man." Namrata Joshi felt that the film "was persuasive on paper, perhaps, but certainly not on screen." Raja Sen called it a "pointless, witless remake" and further calling it a "mediocre thriller which can’t keep up with its characters — or their indignation." Sanjukta Sharma of Scroll.in said that the film "has an anti-establishment heart, but because of the somewhat outdated execution, it falls flat as a two-hour watch."

Saibal Chatterjee of NDTV said: " This film may not be on par with the work that inspired it, but it does have enough to say to justify its existence." Ajit Duara of Open called it "disappointing", and a film that "promises much, but lives up to its covenant feebly." Aditya Mani Jha of Firstpost said that the film "falls well short of the mark, mostly due to an erratic script that never quite takes off." Gautam Bhaskaran of News18 wrote: "Ranade's work has its flaws. At times, he takes the easy way out by over writing, and in places, Albert lets you lose your grip on the flow." Sukanya Verma of Rediff.com praised Kaul's performance, saying that his "intensity shines and engages even when the subtext to his outburst is poorly established."
