= Sanjay Mone =

Indian actor and writer

- Born: 21 May 1960 (age 66); Bombay, Maharashtra
- Occupation: Film actor
- Years active: 1992–present
- Spouse: Sukanya Kulkarni (m. 1998)
- Children: 1

Sanjay Mone is a veteran Marathi actor, dialogue writer and script writer. He has also written many plays and regularly writes in the newspaper. He worked in a number of TV serials, plays and films.

== TV serials ==
1. Ambat Goad
2. Khulta Kali Khulena
3. Maziya Priyala Preet Kalena
4. Avaghachi Sansar
5. Aabhalmaya
6. Kanala Khada
7. De Dhamaal
8. Shiva

== Filmography ==
- Dhyasparva ध्यासपर्व (2001)
- Pak Pak Pakaak पक पक पकाक (2005)
- Kaydyacha Bola कायद्याचं बोला (2005)
- Matichya Chuli मातीच्या चुली (2006)
- Sade Made Teen साडे माडे तीन (2006)
- It's Breaking News इट्स ब्रेकिंग न्यूज (2007)
- Rakta Charitra रक्त चरित्र (2010)
- Sanshay Kallol संशय कल्लोळ (2013)
- A Paying Ghost अ पेईंग घोस्ट (2015)
- Time Bara Vait टाइम बरा वाईट (2015)
- Classmates क्लासमेट्स (2015)
- Mumbai Time मुंबई टाइम (2016)
- Barayan बारायण (2018)
- Dhagedore धागेदोरे
- Kshitij: A Horizon क्षितिज : अ होरायझन
- LBW (Life Before Marriage) लाईफ बिफोर मॅरेज
- Ringa Ringa रिंगा रिंगा
- Ashach Eka Betavar अशाच एका बेटावर
- A Rainy Day अ रेनी डे
- Investment इन्व्हेस्टमेंट (2012)
- Sanshay Kallol संशय कल्लोळ
- The Strugglers – Aamhi Udyache Hero द स्ट्रगलर - आम्ही उद्याचे हिरो
- Satya सत्या
- Mhais म्हैस
- Savitri ani Satyawan सावित्री आणि सत्यवान
- Bho Bho भो भो
- Shur Aamhi Sardar शूर आम्ही सरदार
- Godavari (2021)
- I Prem U (2023)
- Sridevi Prasanna (2024)
- 8 Don 75 (2024)
- MyLek (2024)
- KarmaVirayan (2024)
- Gharat Ganpati (2024)
- Bin Lagnachi Goshta (2025)
- Tighee 2026

== Dialogue writing ==
- Savitiri ani Satyavan सावित्री आणि सत्यवान (2012)
- Sanshay Kallol संशय कल्लोळ (2013)
- Sade Made Teen साडे माडे तीन
- It's Breaking News इट्स ब्रेकिंग न्यूज (2007)
- Pak Pak Pakak पक पक पकाक (2005)

== Plays ==
- Jhing Chik Jhing (2009)
- Mhais (2013)
- A Rainy Day (2014)
- 1234 (2016)
- Bus Stop (2017)
- 9 Koti 57 Lakh (2017)
- Barayan (2018)

== Awards ==
- Zee TV Award for the play 9 Koti 5.7 million

== Personal life ==
Sanjay Mone is married to actress Sukanya Kulkarni. They are blessed with daughter Julia.
