= Malikwad =

Sainik Malikwad
- Village
- Country: India
- State: Karnataka
- District: Belgaum

Languages
  - Official: Marathi, Kannada, Hindi
- Time zone: UTC+5:30 (IST)
- PIN: 591244

Malikwad is a village which is located in the Belgaum district of Karnataka state, India. It is located on the banks of the Doodhganga River. The river acts as the border between Karnataka and Maharashtra. Due to the border separation, the people in the area are bilingual; many can speak as well as write both Kannada and Marathi languages. Facilities in the village include schools, a library, and public toilets. Agriculture is a major source of income, with the village being one of the top sugarcane producers. In addition to sugarcane, farmers grow various fruits and vegetables, such as tomatoes and bananas. Almost every family has at least one member serving in the Indian Army, earning the village the nickname “Sainik Malikwad,” with “sainik” meaning “soldier.”

The village has very simple infrastructure, with a main road connecting it to the highway. Upon entering, visitors encounter the Ganesh temple, and reflecting the villagers’ devotion, there are a total of eight temples scattered throughout the village. Roads are surfaced and among the traditional village houses stand some larger buildings. In the middle of the village is a wada located upon a hill; this is the house of the sarkar who ruled the village a long time ago, and their family still lives there. There is a society office which distributes grains, rice, and oil to the poor families. At the end of the road is the Gram Panchayat Karyalay, an office which holds all records of villagers. AND GOLDEN KATTA ngo is here
