= Faas (film) =

- Theatrical release poster
- Directed by: Avinash Kolte
- Screenplay by: Avinash Kolte
- Story by: Maheshwari Patil Chakurkar
- Produced by: Maheshwari Patil Chakurkar
- Starring: Upendra Limaye; Kamlesh Sawant; Sayaji Shinde; Pallavi Palkar
- Cinematography: Ramani Ranjan Das
- Edited by: Aashish Mhatre; Apoorva Motiwale Sahay
- Music by: Allen K.P
- Production company: MA Film Entertainment
- Distributed by: Pickle Entertainment
- Release date: 4 February 2022
- Running time: 120 minutes
- Country: India
- Language: Marathi

Faas (transl. Noose) is a 2022 Indian Marathi-language drama film directed by Avinash Kolte and produced by MA Film Entertainment. It stars Upendra Limaye, Kamlesh Sawant, Sayaji Shinde, Pallavi Palkar. The film shows the difficulties and problems in social life faced by a farmer.

The film is produced by Maheshwari Patil Chakurkar and co-produced by Naresh Patil, Pallavi Palkar, Dayanand Avarade, Basavraj Patil, Anil Patil, Vaihali Paddevad.

== Cast ==
- Upendra Limaye
- Kamlesh Sawant
- Sayaji Shinde
- Pallavi Palkar
- Ganesh Chandanshive
- Namdev Patil
- Nikesh Bade
- Dnyanesh Undagavkar
- Umesh Rajhans
- Sharad Kakade
- Ishwar More
- Pawan Vaidya
- Vinay Joshi
- Deva Pandey
- Pooja Tayde

== Soundtrack ==
Faas

Soundtrack album by Amol Deshmukh & Alen K.P
- Released: 2022
- Genre: Feature film soundtrack
- Length: 13:32
- Language: Marathi

Music is composed by Alan K.P and Lyrics is written by Amol Deshmukh. Songs are recorded by Avdhoot Gupte, Sheikh Nishant, Adarsh Shinde, Vaishali Samant and Shubhagi Kedar.

Track listing
No.	Title	Length
1.	"Faas Shirshak Geet(Title track)"	5:03
2.	"Naat Nav Nav"	3:15
3.	"Feeling Zara Zara"	3:40
4.	"Shiv jayanti"	2:34
Total length:		13:32
