= Shashank Shende =

Indian actor, director, producer

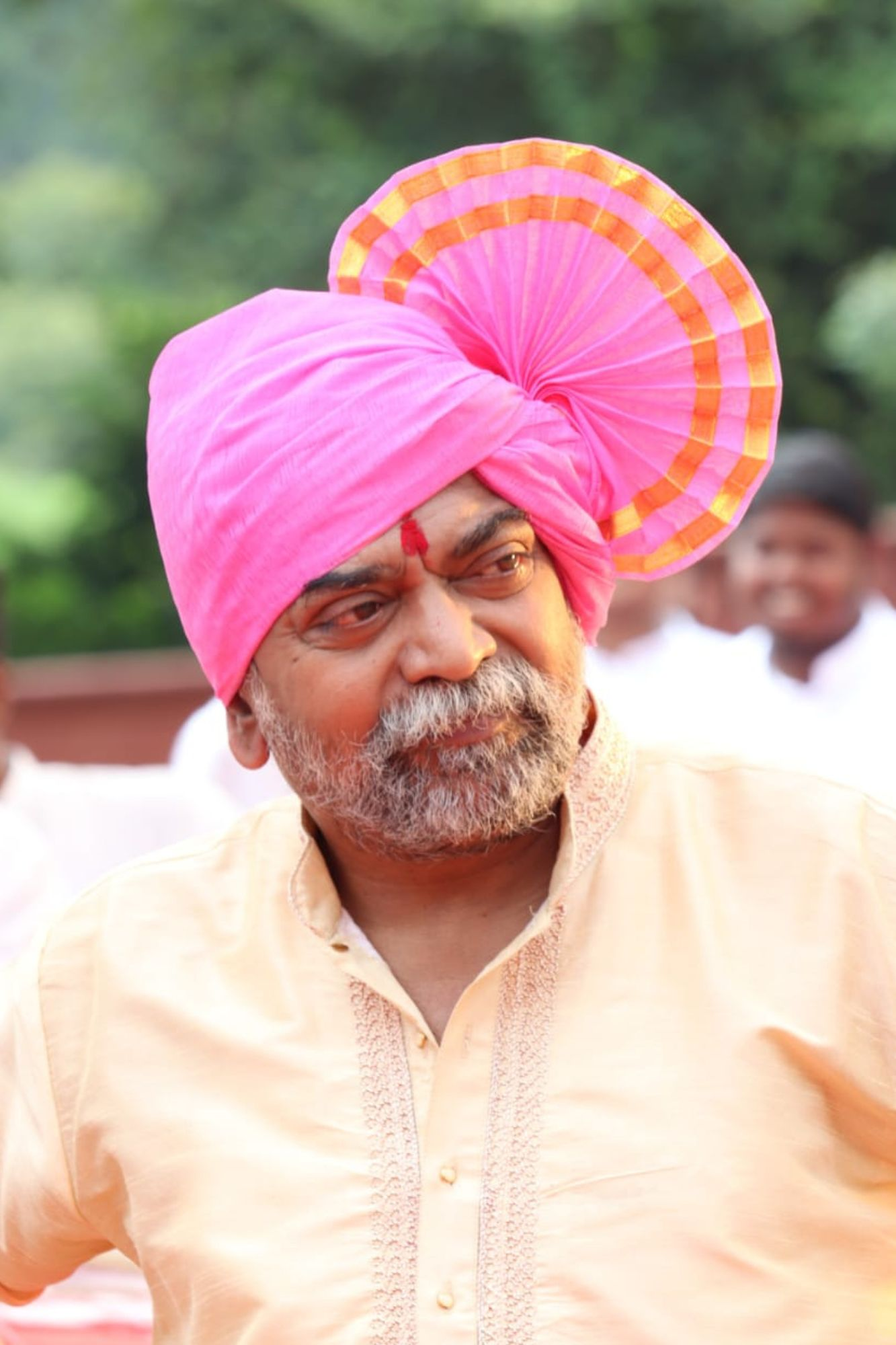
Shashank Shende in Moraya Vinayaka music album.

Shashank Shende is an Indian actor, screenwriter, director and producer who works in Hindi and Marathi films. He received Prestigious Filmfare Award for Best Actor – Marathi For his critically acclaimed movie Baaplyok and also won Zee Chitra Gaurav Puraskar for Best Actor For the same film.

== Early life ==
Shende grew up in Pune till 10th standard, in a middle-class family. He then moved to Ahmednagar for two years before moving back. After college, he started his own business. He got introduced to acting through Satyadev Dubey's workshops and then went on to form his own experimental theatre troupe, Samanvay, with Sandesh Kulkarni, Nikhil Ratnaparkhi, Amruta Subhash and Sonali Kulkarni. He wanted to be a director.

== Career ==
Shende has appeared in various Hindi and Marathi language films.He was awarded Best Actor at the Pune International Film Festival 19th for the film Porga Majetay. He was part of the film Khwada, which received two awards at the 62nd National Film Awards. The film was also shown at the Pune International Film Festival.

He won Filmfare Award for Best Supporting Actor – Marathi for film Kaagar.

He was nominated for the Best Actor Award for Redu at Maharashtra Rajya Chitrapat Mahotsav 2018.

== Filmography ==
Shende was part of films : Ishqiya (as Firoz), City Of Gold, Lalbaug Parel (as Anna), Chillar Party (as Minister Bhide),Chittagong (as Kishorilal), Pangira (as Battasha), Aaghaat (as Dr. Budhkar), Fresh Suicide (as Shivram), Force, Deool, Taryanche Bait, Shala, Bagh Haat Dakhaun (as Krushna) and Maya - The Reality.

Year	Title	Role	Language	Refs
2001	Maya – The Reality			
2006	Bagh Haat Dakhavun	Krushna	Marathi	
2008	Urus	Gana	Marathi	
2009	Kaminey	Ganesh	Hindi	
2010	Aaghaat	Dr.Budhkar	Marathi	
2010	City of Gold	Anna	Marathi, Hindi	
2010	Ishqiya	Shashank	Hindi	
2010	Fresh Suicide	Shivram	Marathi	
2011	Force	Arvind	Hindi	
2011	Chillar Party	Minister Bhide	Hindi	
2011	HE...	Papa	Bhojpuri	
2011	Deool	Ninety (Teacher)	Marathi	
2011	Taryanche Bait	Mahadaa	Marathi	
2011	Shala	Mhatre sheth	Marathi	
2011	Stanley Ka Dabba	Stanley's chacha	Hindi	
2011	Pangira	Battasha	Marathi	
2012	Chittagong	Kishorilal	Hindi, English, Bengali	
2012	Masala	Half Murder		
2012	BMW: Bombay's most wanted	Constable Shinde		
2013	Kurukshetra	Rangrao	Marathi	
2013	Ghanchakkar	Quack Medic	Hindi	
2013	Maunraag	Maundhari	Marathi	
2013	Tuhya Dharma Koncha?	Bija	Marathi	
2013	Rajjo	Gannewala	Hindi	
2014	Bhatukali	Ramesh	Marathi	
2014	Nati		Marathi	
2014	Hate Story 2	Kaka	Hindi	
2014	Ajoba	Mr. Jadhav	Marathi	
2014	Dekh Tamasha Dekh	Lawyer	Hindi	
2014	Vakratunda Mahakaaya		Marathi	
2015	Razzakar	Babban Khan	Marathi	
2015	Khwada	Raghu Karhe	Marathi	
2015	Aabhraan	Bappa	Marathi	
2015	Highway Ek Selfie Aarpar	Shivneri Man	Marathi	
2016	Reti	Mhatre	Marathi	
2016	Ringan	Arjun Magar	Marathi	
2016	Half Ticket	Keshya	Marathi	
2016	Ventilator	Politician Zantey	Marathi	
2016	Babanchi Shala	Mahipati	Marathi	
2017	Happy Birthday		Marathi	
2017	Beyond the Clouds	Rahoul	Hindi	
2017	Biscuit		Marathi	
2017	Bandookya	Dorlya	Marathi	
2017	Ubuntu	Sarpanch	Marathi	
2017	Jay Swachamev Jayte Bola	Aaba	Marathi	
2018	Maska	Yadav	Marathi	
2018	Redu	Tatu	Marathi	
2018	Land 1857		Marathi	
2018	Looose Control	Dattya Bhau	Marathi	
2018	Youngraad	Naamdev Chavan	Marathi	
2018	Zelya	Zelya's uncle	Marathi	
2019	Adham	Datta	Marathi	
2019	Kaagar	Prabhakarrao Deshmukh	Marathi	
2019	Dithee	Shiva	Marathi	
2019	Luckee		Marathi	
2020	Tanhaji	Shelarmama	Hindi	
2020	Chronicle of Space		Marathi	
2020	Online Guru	Kazi	Marathi	
2021	Gast	Hari Bhunge	Marathi	
2021	Befaam	Sarvanand Maharaj	Marathi	
2021	Institute Of Pavtollogy			
2022	Soyrik	Police Inspector	Marathi	
2022	Nay Varanbhat Loncha Kon Nay Koncha	Babi	Marathi	
2022	Irsal	Karyakarta	Marathi	
2022	Bharat Mazha Desh Aahe	Aaba	Marathi	
2022	Palyad	Mahadu	Marathi	
2022	143	Kaalya	Marathi	
2022	Jindagani	Prabhakar	Marathi	
2022	Rivanawayali	Rajaram Desai	Marathi	
2022	Ekdam Kadak	Mama	Marathi	
2023	Tarri	Sangram 's father	Marathi	
2023	Baaplyok	Tatya	Marathi	
2023	Ankush	Avinash Surve	Marathi	
2023	Pillu Bachelor	Aakash's father	Marathi	
2023	Club 52		Marathi	
2023	Sajini Shinde Ka Viral Video	Sadashiv Shinde	Hindi	
2023	Aarya: The daughter of Bharat	Humlo	Hindi	
2023	Dobya		Marathi	
2023	Adbhut	Ramakant Yadav	Hindi	
2024	Gaarud	Gajanan	Marathi	
2024	Shri Ganesha	Bhausaheb Patil	Marathi	
2025	Mangla	Mukund Deshpande	Marathi	
2025	Jay Bhim Panther	Mahadu	Marathi	
2025	Punha Shivajiraje Bhosale	Tatya	Marathi	
2026	Super Duper	Namdev Jadhav	Marathi	
2026	Salbardi	Ganpat Patil	Marathi	
2026	Ladki Bahin	Mohan	Marathi	
2026	Ghabadkund	Baba	Marathi	
2026	Paach Futacha Bachchan	Baba	Marathi	
2026	Mrutyuchakra	Janardan Patait	Marathi	
