= List of Marathi films of 2007 =

A list of films produced by the Marathi language film industry based in Maharashtra in the year 2007.

== January–March ==
	Opening	Title	Director	Cast	Producer	Genre	Source
J A N	4	Dohaa	Pushkaraj Raj Paranjpe	Leena Bhagwat, Abhay Mahajan, Suhas Palshikar	Magic Eye Films	Drama	
F E B	8	Jau Tithe Khau	Abhay Kirti	Makarand Anaspure, Kuldeep Pawar, Dipali Sayyad	Everest Entertainment, Paandav Productions	Comedy	
F E B	23	Bandkhor	Deepak Sawakhande	Sandip Deshmukh, Meena Suryawanshi, Manjusha Mane	Chaturthi Films	Drama	

== April–June ==
	Opening	Title	Director	Cast	Producer	Notes	Genre	Source
A P R	12	Arre... Devaa	Hemant Deokar	Makarand Anaspure, Surekha Kudachi, Arun Nalawade	Everest Entertainment		Drama film	
A P R	23	Lagnacha Dhumdhadaka	Pitambar Kale	Vijay Chavan, Bharat Jadhav, Sanjay Narvekar	Everest Entertainment		Romance	
M A Y	18	Zabardast	Mahesh Kothare	Pushkar Jog, Manasi Naik, Sanjay Narvekar	S J Films		Action, Adventure, Drama	

== July–September ==
Opening	Title	Director	Cast	Producer	Notes	Genre	Source
J U L
A U G
S E P

== October–December ==
	Opening	Title	Director	Writer	Cast	Producer	Notes	Genre	Source
O C T	12	Bakula Namdeo Ghotale	Kedar Shinde		Bharat Jadhav, Siddharth Jadhav, Vijay Chavan	Shemaroo Films	Bharat Jadhav's Negative role	Comedy film	
O C T	23	Bharat Aala Parat	Vijay Gokhale	Anand Mhasvekar	Bharat Jadhav, Ramesh Bhatkar, Vijay Chavan, Anand Mhasvekar			Comedy	
N O V	23	Saade Maade Teen		Ankush Choudhary, Sachit Patil	Ashok Saraf, Makarand Anaspure, Bharat Jadhav, Amruta Khanvilkar, Siddharth Jadhav			Comedy	
D E C	7	Kadachit	Chandrakant Kulkarni		Ashwini Bhave, Sachin Khedekar, Sadashiv Amrapurkar	Kasa Films		Drama, Mystery, Thriller	
D E C	28	Mumbaicha Dabewala	Manohar Sarvankar		Smitha Gondkar, Bharat Jadhav, Deepali Saiyyed	Everest Entertainment		Drama	

== Date unknown ==
A list of Marathi films released in 2007.

Year	Film	Director	Cast	Release Date	Producer	Notes	Source
2007	Nirop	Sachin Kundalkar	Sameer Dharmadhikari, Devika Daftardar, Gauri Kulkarni			National Film Award for Best Feature Film in Marathi in 2007	
2007	Gadhvache Lagna	Raju Phulkar	Makarand Anaspure, Sonalee Kulkarni, Gazhal Dabholkar, Sanjay Khapre		S. B. Pardesi Productions, Sumeet Movies	Sonalee Kulkarni's Marathi Movie debut	
2007	Gojiri	Viju Mane	Sunil Barve, Madhura Velankar, Abhijeet Chavan		Tanvi Productions		
2007	Jinki Re Jinki	Rishi Deshpande	Sharad Mone, Tanay Dighe, Devashis Paranjpe		Vikrant Patil, Rishi Deshpande		
2007	Savalee	Rajendra Talak	Reema Lagoo, Swapnil Bandodkar, Urmila Kanitkar		National Education and Information Films		
2007	Aevdhese Aabhal	Bipin Nadkarni	Prateeksha Lonkar, Hrutvik Nadkarni, Ashok Shinde				
2007	Soor Rahu De	Mohan Jawade, Mangesh Kadam	Sunil Barve, Shubhangi Gokhale, Kshitij Jharapkar		Everest Entertainment		
2007	Maherchi Maaya	Satish Ranadive	Master Abu, Kishori Ambiye, Milind Gawli		Pasayedham Chitra		
2007	Sawar Re	Gajendra Ahire	Mukta Barve, Devika Daftardar, Vandana Gupte, Kamlesh Sawant, Madhu Kambikar		Gajendra Ahire		
