= List of Marathi films of 2010 =

A list of films produced by the Marathi language film industry based in Maharashtra in the year 2010.

== January – March ==
Opening		Title	Director	Cast	Genre	Source
J A N	1	Goshta Lagnanantarchi	Ramesh Deo	Ashok Saraf, Ramesh Deo, Nitesh Khatavkar, Pady Kamble, Aniket Kelkar, Sonalee Kulkarni, Arun Nalawade, Viju Khote	Family / Drama	
J A N	1	Natarang	Ravi Jadhav	Atul Kulkarni, Sonalee Kulkarni, Kishor Kadam, Vibhavari Deshpande, Priya Berde	Musical	
J A N	1	Asa Mi Kay Gunha Kela	Anand Mhasvekar	Anand Abhyankar, Asha Sathe, Arun Nalavade, Ramesh Bhatkar, Pradeep Velankarr, Anand Mhasvekar, Vijay Gokhale, Dr. Girish Oak, Suneel Jadhav, Dhanashree Kshirsagar	Drama	
J A N	15	Shikshanachya Aaicha Gho	Mahesh Manjrekar	Sachin Khedekar, Bharat Jadhav, Saksham Kulkarni, Gauri Vaidya, Siddarth Jadhav, Atul Kale	Children	
J A N	22	Zenda	Avdhoot Gupte	Sachit Patil, Santosh Juvekar, Pushkar Shotri, Sunil Tawade, Chinmay Mandlekar	Politics	
J A N	29	Harishchandrachi Factory	Paresh Mokashi	Nandu Madhav, Vibhavari Deshpande, Mohit Gokhale, Atharva Karve, Vaibhav Mangle	Biographical	
J A N	29	Kshanokshani	Sangeet Kulkarni	Subodh Bhave, Madhura Velankar-Satam, Amruta Subhash, Umesh Kamat, Dilip Prabhawalkar, Kiran Karmarkar, Atul Parchure, Ravindra Mankani, Jayant Wadkar, Uday Sabnis, Abhijeet Chavan, Manjusha Godse, Pushkar Shrotri, Kalyani Mule	Drama	
F E B	19	Ringa Ringa	Sanjay Jadhav	Sonali Kulkarni, Ajinkya Dev, Bharat Jadhav, Ankush Choudhary, Santosh Juvekar, Aditi Gowitrikar	Drama / Thriller	
M A R	26	Me Mann Ani Dhruv	Aditi Deshpande	Mahendra Agashe, Ketaki Thatte, Dhruv Pendse, Smita Tambe, Satish Pulekar	Drama	
M A R	26	Huppa Huiyya	Anil Surve	Siddharth Jadhav, Girija Oak, Mohan Joshi, Usha Nadkarni	Fantasy, Action, Drama	

== April – June ==
Opening		Title	Director	Cast	Genre	Source
A P R	8	Lalbaug Parel	Mahesh Manjrekar	Shashank Shende, Seema Biswas, Ankush Choudhary, Anusha Dandekar, Vineet Kumar, Veena Jamkar, Karan Patel, Siddharth Jadhav, Satish Kaushik, Kashmera Shah, Sameer Dharmadhikari, Ganesh Yadav, Sachin Khedekar, Vinay Apte	Drama	
A P R	9	Kshanbhar Vishranti	Sachit Patil	Bharat Jadhav, Sachit Patil, Siddharth Jadhav, Sonalee Kulkarni, Kadambari Kadam, Shubhangi Gokhale, Jayraj Nair, Nitin Jadhav	Drama	
A P R	23	Irada Pakka	Kedar Shinde	Minal Bal, Siddharth Jadhav, Smita Jaykar, Mohan Joshi, Nirmala Kotnis, Sonalee Kulkarni	Comedy	
A P R	28	Vavtal	Shivaji Patil	Tejaswini Pandit, Ashok Samarth, Mukesh Tiwari, Vinay Apte, Sunil Shinde	Action	
M A Y	7	Anandi Anand	Purushottam Berde	Anandraj, Priya Bapat, Rajan Tamhane, Latika Gore, Chinmay Kolhatkar, Vikram Gokhale, Suhas Joshi, Mohan Joshi, Vandana Gupte, Mangesh Desai, Paddy Kamble, Akshya Bhingarde, Sumit Pawar, Swamini Wadkar	Family / Drama	
M A Y	7	Kon Aahe Re Tikade	Tanaji Gadge	Mohan Aagashe, Subhodh Bhave, Sharad Ponkshe, Sunil Godse, Mohan Joshi, Mangesh Desai, Jayant Bobde, Shubhangi Gokhale, Hemangi Kavi	Comedy	
M A Y	14	Krantiveer Rajguru	Ashok Kamle	Chinmay Mandlekar, Pankaj Vishnu, Vilas Chauhan, Milind Gunaji, Suhasini Mulay, Dhanashree Chavan, Sharad Ponkshe, Anand Abhyankar, Master Ashwin Chitale	Historical	
M A Y	14	Ranbhool	Sanjay Surkar	Subhodh Bhave, Tejaswini Pandit, Mohan Joshi	Drama	
M A Y	14	Umang	Nitinkumar Mohanlala Bora, Pitambar Kale	Ramesh Bhatkar, Prema Kiran, Milind Shinde, Prince Bora, Ram Kajolkar, Kanchan Bora	Drama	
M A Y	21	Most Wanted	Rajan Prabhu	Ashok Saraf, Milind Gawali, Deepak Shirke, Kiran Ronge, Satish Bapat	Comedy	
M A Y	21	Mulga	Devendra Supekar	Dr. Amol Kolhe, Deepa Parab, Sharad Ponkshe, Teja Devkar, Vinod Kamble, Fayaz Shaikh, Ragini Samant, Anjali Ujawane	Drama	
M A Y	28	Pratisaad - The Response	Yogesh Dattatraya Gosavi	Sandeep Kulkarni, Kishor Kadam, Neelam Shirke, Jayant Sawarkar, Suneel Tawade, Pragati Joshi, Aishwarya, Anand Alkunte, Aman Attar, Pratibha Date, Yogesh Dattatraya Gosavi	Drama	Yogesh Dattatraya Gosavi's directorial debut
M A Y	28	Target	Vivek Gore, Rakesh Kholam	Sanjay Narvekar, Ankush Chaudhari, Siddharth Jadhav, Swapnil Joshi, Kranti Redkar, Tejaswini Pandit, Smita Gondkar, Tejas Kulkarni, Vinay Apte, Sanjay Mone, Manasi Naik	Drama	
J U N	4	Asa Mi Tasa Mi	Rakesh Chaturvedi	Makarand Anaspure, Rahul Mehehdale, Shweta Mehendale, Ravindra Berde, Avtar Gill, Shruthi Marathe	Comedy	
J U N	11	Jhing Chik Jhing	Nitin Nandan	Bharat Jadhav, Dilip Prabhavalkar, Madhavi Juvekar, Sanjay Mone, Chinmay Kambli, Arti More	Family / Drama	
J U N	11	Mumbai-Pune-Mumbai	Satish Rajwade	Swapnil Joshi, Mukta Barve	Romance	
J U N	11	Aaya Sawant Jhoom Ke	Rajesh Deshpande	Makarand Anaspure, Ravindra Berde, Vaibhav Mangle	Comedy, Drama	
J U N	25	Haapus	Abhijeet Satam	Makarand Anaspure, Subodh Bhave, Madhura Velankar, Shivaji Satam, Pushkar Shotri, Sulabha Deshpande	Drama	

== July – September ==
Opening		Title	Director	Cast	Genre	Source
J U L	6	Khurchi Samraat	Dattaramm Tawade	Makarand Anaspure, Rutuja Patil, Chetan Dalvi, Kishori Ambiye, Vilas Rakate, Baal Dhuri, Usha Naik, Anuja Ranade, Shanta Tambe, N. Relekar, Surekha Kudachi, Vijay Chavan	Politics / Comedy	
J U L	9	Tata Birla ani Laila	Raju Parsekar	Ashok Saraf, Bharat Jadhav, Sheetal Jadhav, Usha Naik, Vijay Chavan, Vijay Gokhale, Ravindra Berde, Bharat Ganeshpure, Arun Kadam, Sanjay Khapre, Mohan Joshi	Comedy	
J U L	16	Mission Possible	Pushkar Jog	Pushkar Jog, Manisha Kelkar, Sai Tamhankar, Sharad Ponkshe, Niranjan Namjoshi, Astaad Kale, Shantanu Moghe	Action / Romance / Thriller	
J U L	30	Chitra	Raj Kuber	Ankush Choudhary, Nisha Parulekar, Tejashree Pradhan, Mohan Joshi, Kuldeep Pawar	Drama	
A U G	6	Jetaa	Ajinkya Dev, Amol Shetge	Ramesh Dev, Seema Dev, Ajinkya Dev, Sharad Ponkshe, Manava Naik, Sandeep Mehta, Prasad Oak, Ravi Patwardhan	Drama	
A U G	13	Aika Dajiba	Kishori Shahane	Ashok Saraf, Kishori Shahane, Mukta Barve, Prasad Oak, Priya Bapat, Rupesh Patole, Kishori Ambiye, Dipjyoti Naik, Vinay Yedekar, Ravidra Berde and Shakti Kapoor	Comedy	
A U G	13	Tee Ratra	Viju Mane	Prasad Oak, Santosh Juvekar, Aditi Sarangdhar, Subodh Bhave, Mangesh Desai, Vaibhav Mangale	Thriller	
A U G	20	Aai Tujha Aashirwad	Madhura Pandit Jasraj	Milind Gawali, Arun Nalawade	Drama	
A U G	20	Debu	Nilesh Jalamkar	Mohan Joshi, Bharat Ganeshpure, Ashwini Ekbote, Madhu Kambikar, Ravindra Berde, Ravi Patwardhan	Drama	
A U G	27	Navra Avli Baiko Lavli	Sanjeev Naik	Prasad Oak, Siya Patil, Sai Tamhankar, Jeetendra Joshi, Shekhar Phadke, Sunil Tawde, Suhas Parajape, Usha Naik	Romance	
A U G	27	Paradh	Gajendra Ahire	Siddarth Jadhav, Makarand Anaspure, Amogh Talathi, Shahir Vitthal Umap, Ravi Kale, Vrinda Ahire, Vinay Apte	Action / Thriller	
A U G	27	Sa Sasucha	Kishor Pandurang Belekar	Sunil Barve, Sonalee Kulkarni, Shubhangi Gokhale, Vinay Apte	Thriller	
S E P	17	Laadi Godi	Mahesh Tilekar	Bharat Jadhav, Deepali Sayyad, Sanjay Narvekar, Kranti Redkar, Aniket Vishwasrao, Subhodh Bhave	Comedy	
S E P	24	Ajab Lagnachi Gajab Gosht	Shivdarshan-Amit	Sai Tamhankar, Umesh Kamat, Sunil Tawde, Viju Khote, Vaibhav Mangale, Kamalakar Satpute, Vijay Patwardhan, Sanjay Khapre	Comedy	

== October – December ==
Opening		Title	Director	Cast	Genre	Source
O C T	1	Khurchi Samrat	Dattaram Tawade	Makarand Anaspure, Rutuja Patil, Chetan Dalvi, Kishori Ambiye	Comedy / Politics	
O C T	1	Ved Lavi Jeeva	Mahesh Kothare	Adinath Kothare, Vaidehi Parshurami	Romance, Action	
O C T	8	Agadbam	Satish Motling	Makarand Anaspure, Trupti Bhoir, Usha Nadkarni, Chitra Navathe, Vikas Samudre, Narayan Jadhav, Tejaswee Patil, Mahesh Kokate, Mangesh Satpute	Comedy	
O C T	15	Bhairu Pailwan Ki Jai Ho	Pravin Raja Karale	Siddarth Jadhav, Usha Nadkarni, Ashish Pawar, Priyanka Yadav, Sanjay Belose	Comedy / Drama	
O C T	22	Kas	Mahesh Satoskar, Aruna Joglekar	Bhargavi Chirmule, Prasad Oak, Rajesh Shringapure, Anand Abhyankar	Family / Drama	
O C T	22	Mani Mangalsutra	Gauri Karekar Sarwate	Hrishitaa Bhatt, Ravindra Mankani, Anjali Kusre, Lalan Sarang	Family / Drama	
O C T	28	Topi Ghala Re	Umesh Namjoshi	Arun Nalawade, Nirmiti Sawant, Smita Talwalkar, Priya Arun, Mukta Barve, Mangesh Desai, Pushkar Shrotri, Vijay Chavan, Vijay Kadam	Comedy	
O C T	29	Dho Dho Pausatil One Day Match	Nitin Kamble	Suhas Palshikar, Vijay Chavan, Shekhar Phadke, Priyanka Yadav, Madhavi Juvekar, Ravindra Berde	Drama	
O C T	29	Vacation	Deepak Sadashiv Tarker	Satish Pulekar, Ashwini Ekbote, Anand Abhyankar, Shrikant Desai	Drama	
N O V	5	Maher Maza	Abhay Kirti	Nisha Parulekar, Mangesh Desai, Kishore Mahabole, Akshay Pendse	Drama	
N O V	12	Mee Sindhutai Sapkal	Ananth Narayan Mahadevan	Tejaswini Pandit, Jyoti Chandekar, Upendra Limaye, Neena Kulkarni, Suhas Palshikar, Charushila Sable, Ganesh Yadav, Jaywant Wadkar, Pranjal shetye	Biographical	
N O V	19	Sumbaran	Gajendra Ahire	Makarand Anaspure, Shilpa Anaspure, Jitendra Joshi, Mukta Barve, Siddharth Jadhav, Sai Tamhankar, Ravindra Mankani, Vrinda Ahire	Drama	
N O V	26	Agnipariksha	Anil Surve	Alka Kubal, Sanjay Narvekar, Mohan Joshi, Sanjay Khapre	Drama	
D E C	3	Aai Raja Udo Udo	Hemchandra Sawant	Ramesh Bhatkar, Usha Naik, Vijay Chavan	Drama	
D E C	3	Vithu Maza Bhauraya	Sanjiv Kolte	Ashoke Shinde, Minal Ghorpade, Vasant Hankare, Gajanan Gokhale, Swanand Joshi	Devotional	
D E C	10	Aata Pita	Uttung Shelar	Bharat Jadhav, Sanjay Narvekar, Ashwini Apte, Girish Salvi, Pradeep kabre, Mohan Khambete, Pratibha Goregaonkar, Raju Shisadkar, Santosh Patil, Rahul Kulkarni, Rohan Bhalekar, Satish Pulekar	Comedy	
D E C	17	Chandrakala	Nitin Kamble	Vijay Chavan, Kuldeep Pawar, Anjali Joshi	Drama	
D E C	17	Samudra	Gajendra Ahire	Mohan Agashe, Sonalee Kulkarni, Sachit Patil, Sharvari Jamenis, Anand Abhyankar	Suspense	
D E C	24	Aaghaat	Vikram Gokhale	Vikram Gokhale, Mukta Barve, Kadambari Kadam, Suhas Joshi, Arun Nalawade, Madhav Abhyankar	Drama	
D E C	24	Aaji Aani Naat	Subhash Phadke	Sulbha Deshpande, Tejashree Walavalkar, Ashish Kulkarni, Amruta Deshmukh, Ashok Shinde, Prajakta Kelkar	Family	
D E C	24	Chal Dhar Pakad	Atmaram Dharane	Nirmiti Sawant, Nagesh Bhosle, Priya Berde, Teja Devkar, Megha Ghadge, Siya Patil, Shital Bankar, Swati Deval	Comedy	
D E C	24	Hungama	Rohan B. Shivalkar	Anshuman Vichare	Comedy	
D E C	24	Marmabandh (Bonds of Heart)	Dinesh P. Bhonsle	Girish Pardeshi, Kshitij Zarapkar, Mrunal Deshpande, Nandu Madhav, Dr. Vilas Ujawne, Veena Jamkar	Drama	
D E C	24	On Duty 24 Taas	Kedar Shinde	Dr. Amol Kolhe, Kranti Redkar, Vijay Kadam, Sanjivani Jadhav, Minal Baal	Comedy / Drama	
D E C	31	Ideachi Kalpana	Sachin Pilgaonkar	Sachin Pilgaonkar, Ashok Saraf, Mahesh Kothare, Bhargavi Chirmule, Nirmiti Sawant	Comedy	
