= Sonalee Kulkarni =

Indian actress

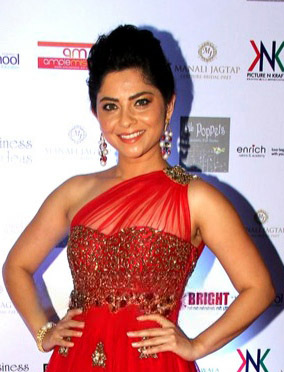
- Kulkarni in 2015
- Born: 18 May 1988 (age 38); Pune, Maharashtra, India
- Occupation: Actress
- Years active: 2005–present
- Spouse: Kunal Benodekar (m. 2021)
- Website: sonaleekulkarni.com

Sonalee Kulkarni Benodekar (née Kulkarni) is an Indian actress working mostly in Marathi cinema. Praised for her versatility and powerful performances, she is one of the highest-paid actresses in Marathi cinema and has received numerous accolades, including two Filmfare Awards Marathi, a Maharashtra State Film Award, four Zee Chitra Gaurav Puraskar and four Maharashtracha Favourite Kon Awards.

Kulkarni began her career as a model and dancer, making her acting debut in the Marathi television series Ha Khel Sanchitacha (2006) and subsequently in the film Gauri (2006). Her breakthrough came with the title role in Kedar Shinde's Bakula Namdeo Ghotale (2007), which earned her the Zee Chitra Gaurav Puraskar for Best Actress and the Maharashtra State Film Award for Best Debut Actress. Her performance in the Tamasha drama film Natarang (2010), where she portrayed the dancer Nayna Kolhapurkarin, earned her widespread recognition and the title "Apsara of Marathi Industry." The film was a critical and commercial success, further solidifying her status in the industry.

Throughout the 2010s, Kulkarni appeared in several notable films, including Nitin Chandrakant Desai's Ajintha (2012), the horror comedy Zapatlela 2 (2013), the ensemble coming-of-age Classmates (2015), the thriller Shutter (2015), and the drama Poshter Girl (2016). Her role as a strong girl in the romantic drama Mitwaa (2015) garnered her a Filmfare Award Marathi nomination for Best Actress. She made her Hindi film debut with the adult comedy Grand Masti (2013) and appeared in a supporting role in Singham Returns (2014). She continued to experiment with various genres in Marathi, earning acclaim for her performances as an unhappy girl in Hampi (2017), the dissatisfied wife in Tula Kalnnaar Nahi (2017), and the brave mother in Hirkani (2019), the latter of which won her the Filmfare Critics Award for Best Actress.

In recent years, Kulkarni has explored unconventional roles, starring in films like Dhurala (2020), Jhimma (2021), Pandu (2021), and Tamasha Live (2022). Her portrayal in Dhurala earned her the Filmfare Award for Best Supporting Actress. She was nominated for Maharashtra State Film Awards in Best Actress category for Tamasha Live. She made her Malayalam debut with Malaikottai Vaaliban (2024), opposite Mohanlal.

Kulkarni married Kunal Benodekar in 2021 in Dubai.

== Early life ==
Sonalee Kulkarni was born to Manohar and Savinder Kulkarni in the army cantonment of Khadki, Pune into a Marathi Brahmin family. Her father Manohar Kulkarni is a retired Army doctor. She studied at Army School, Kendriya Vidyalaya and finished her graduation in mass communication and journalism from Fergusson College, Pune. She also has a post graduation degree in mass communication from Indira School of Communication. Sonalee has a younger brother who owns an event company called Fledgers.

== Acting career ==
=== Early work and recognition (2006–2009) ===
Kulkarni started her career as a model and dancer, and while doing a small role in a docu-drama in FTII, she first witnessed a motion picture camera, which sparked her interest in acting. She made her acting debut with the Marathi daily soap Ha Khel Sanchitacha (2006), alongside veteran Marathi actor Vikram Gokhle. The same year, she made her film debut with a title role in Gauri (2006), where she played an innocent and open-minded girl who falls ill suddenly and undergoes treatment in a shepherd's house. On the sets of Ha Khel Sanchitacha, she was offered Gadhvacha Lagna, where she did a cameo as Apsara Rambha in a dance number called Indra Darbari, Nache Sundari. During this period, she had a meeting with Ankush Chaudhari, for his directorial debut with Saade Maade Teen (2007). Chaudhari then recommended her to Kedar Shinde for his comedy drama Bakula Namdeo Ghotale (2007). This marked her first film as a lead actress. Critic Pradip Patil wrote in his review, "Kulkarni plays her part with confidence." She received Best Actress at the Zee Gaurav Puraskar and also Best Debut Actress at 45th Maharashtra State Film Awards.

In the following years, she starred in the ensemble Hai Kai Nai Kai (2009), the romantic comedy Goshta Lagnanantarchi (2010), and the romantic ensemble Kshanbhar Vishranti (2010). These movies did not have much success at the box office.

=== Rise to prominence (2010–2014) ===
In 2010, Sonalee was seen in Ravi Jadhav's Natarang, a drama based on Anand Yadav's 1978 Marathi novel of the same name, which depicts the journey of a young artist in overcoming hurdles related to gender bias and the sacrifices of an artist for the love of his art. She portrayed Nayna Kolhapurkarin, the young dancer in Guna's (played by Atul Kulkarni) troupe. The film was selected as the opening film at the Asian Film Festival and also screened at the MAMI Film Festival and the Pune International Film Festival. It was one of the highest grossing Marathi films till 2017. Critics were divided over her performance, although they praised her dance in the film. Kulkarni is known as the "Apsara of Marathi Industry" after her performance in the song "Apsara Ali" in the film. Her next release was Kedar Shinde's Irada Pakka where she played the character of Aadya a pre-school teacher opposite Siddharth Jadhav. She ended 2010 with Gajendra Ahire's Samudra where she worked opposite veteran Marathi actor Mohan Agashe. Both the films was received positive reviews from critics and audiences.

After a year's gap, she appeared in Ajintha (2012), directed by Nitin Chandrakant Desai. The film tells a love story between a Marathi Buddhist tribal Paro (played by Kulkarni) and British Major Robert Gill, an artist, while he visited India to paint historical monuments and scriptures. The film was well received by critics, Shakti Salgaokar of DNA wrote, "One can't help but notice that Kulkarni flaunts her body in revealing outfits with much grace." Keyur Seta of The Common Man Speaks, calling it a "picturesque saga," wrote, "Kulkarni moulds herself brilliantly in the role of Paro and expresses every emotion with ease. She impresses with her dancing skills too. This will surely be a talked-about performance from her career, even after decades."

In 2013, Kulkarni was seen in Mahesh Kothare's Zapatlela 2, the sequel to Zapatlela (1993), opposite Adinath Kothare. The film received mixed reviews but was a box office success. The same year, she made her Bollywood debut with Indra Kumar's adult comedy Grand Masti, the second installment of the Masti series. The film garnered negative reviews upon release, although it was one of the highest-grossing Bollywood films of 2013. In 2014, Kulkarni played a supporting roles in Rohit Shetty's Hindi political action film Singham Returns and Mrinal Kulkarni's Marathi historical drama Rama Madhav.

=== Established actress and commercial success (2015–2019) ===
In 2015, she had three releases, the first of all was Aditya Sarpotdar's coming-of-age film Classmates, a remake of the 2006 Malayalam film with the same name, alongside an ensemble cast of Chaudhari, Sai Tamhankar, Sachit Patil, and Siddharth Chandekar. Her role and the film were critically and commercially acclaimed, becoming one of the highest grossing Marathi films of all time. Her next release was the romantic drama Mitwaa, opposite Swapnil Joshi and Prarthana Behere. Mihir Bhanage of The Times of India, for her portrayal, wrote, "Sonalee sans makeup plays her role of a girl trapped between love and marital ties well" The film collected ₹13.5 crore (US$1.7 million) at the box office. She received the nomination at the Zee Chitra Gaurav Puraskar and the Filmfare Awards Marathi in the Best Actress category. Her last release of the year was the thriller Shutter, another remake of the Malayalam film of the same name. The film showcases incidents that happen to four people in 24 hours, and Kulkarni portrayed Hooker, who was played by Sajitha Madathil in the original. Mihir Bhanage of The Times of India described her as "the conniving and manipulative turned soft-hearted prostitute." In 2016, Kulkarni had only one release, Poster Girl, which was average at the box office. She won Sanskruti Kaladarpan Award for Best Actress.

Next she received second Filmfare Best Actress nomination for her portrayal of depressed girl who doesn't believe in love in Prakash Kunte's Hampi (2017), Blessy Chettiar of Cinestaan, remarked, "the character you love to hate. She is fiercely pessimistic and her self-loathing makes you cringe. But the lack of depth to her character limits Kulkarni," and Mihir Bhanage of The Times of India wrote, "Sonalee brings authenticity to her role by underplaying it and yet catching your attention throughout." The film was commercial success. Her next film was Tula Kalnnaar Nahi opposite Subodh Bhave, the story revolves around love and hate relationship of husband and wife. Mihir Bhanage of The Times of India compared their pair to that of Shah Rukh Khan and Kajol from KKHH and concluded, "the lead pair, has enacted the situations so naturally that you end up being hooked."

In 2019, she once again collaborated with director Mrinal Kulkarni for romantic comedy Ti & Ti, which was shot in London and its suburb. She played the other 'Ti' in the story of arranged marriage couple Anay and Sai (played by Pushkar Jog and Behere respectively). Ullhas Shirke of Marathi Movie World ascribed her performance by calling it, "Kulkarni grabs all the attention with her superb performance" Her other two films of that year was Hirkani and Vicky Velingkar, in the both films she performed titular role. Hirkani, the historical drama directed by Prasad Oak about a brave woman and an amazing mother who lived near the Raigad Fort in Maharashtra during the regime Chhatrapati Shivaji Maharaj. Mihir Bhanage of The Times of India asserted, "The one thing that stands out about the film is Sonalee's performance. The actress sheds her glam image and delivers a beautiful performance, so much that you start associating her with the real character that the movie is based on." The film was a huge commercial success with grossing over ₹12 crore at the box office. Kulkarni received Filmfare Critics Award, Sakaal Premier Awards and Maharashtracha Favourite Kon in Best Actress catory. Her next release, Vicky Velingkar, a comic book artist and a clock seller gets entangled in an unexpected mystery and rises against all odds. It got mixed reviews from the critics and was below average at the box office.

=== Experiment with unconventional roles (2020–present) ===
In 2020, Kulkarni played supporting role of youngest daughter-in-law of Uhbe family and her character pretends that she is not behind the struggle of power in Sameer Vidwans' political drama Dhurala, The film won seven Filmfare Awards, including Best Supporting Actress for Kulkarni (shared with Geetanjali Kulkarni for Karkhanisanchi Waari). Kulkarni first release of 2021 was Hemant Dhome's drama film Jhimma, the story about a group of seven women travelling to United Kingdom and discovering themselves, starred alongside an ensemble cast of Suhas Joshi, Nirmiti Sawant, Siddharth Chandekar, Kshitee Jog, Suchitra Bandekar, Mrinmayee Godbole and Sayali Sanjeev. The film was highly acclaimed and grossed ₹14.07 crore (US$1.8 million) at the box office, becoming the second highest grossing Marathi film of 2021. Her next portrayed of Usha, the banana vendor in Zee Studio's Pandu was huge success with grossed ₹59 million at box office. She received Filmfare Award nomination and won Zee Talkies Comedy Awards for Best Actress.

In 2022, she collaborated with Sanjay Jadhav for musical drama Tamasha Live, she played a budding reporter who dreams of working with a popular news anchor. Mihir Bhanage of The Times of India wrote, "Sonalee shines in her scenes and is consistent." The film was a commercial failure, though she received nominations at the Filmfare Awards as well as the Maharashtra State Awards. Kulkarni subsequently appeared in Victoria - Ek Rahasya, a horror-thriller film directed by Virajas Kulkarni. She made her Malayalam debut with Lijo Jose Pellissery directed 2024 period fantasy film Malaikottai Vaaliban opposite Mohanlal. Latha Srinivasan of Hindustan Times wrote that she was "apt as danseuse Rangarani who is captivated by Malaikottai Vaaliban". The film was a commercial failure.

== Personal life ==
In her childhood, she used to live in Pradhikaran, Nigdi, Pune.

Sonalee married Kunal Benodekar on 7 May 2021 in Dubai.

== Filmography ==
Key
†	Denotes films that have not yet been released

=== Films ===
Year	Title	Role	Language	Notes	Ref.
2006	Gauri	Gauri	Marathi		
2007	Gadhvacha Lagna	Apsara Rambha	Marathi	Cameo appearance in the song "Indra Darbari, Nache Sundari"	
2007	Bakula Namdeo Ghotale	Bakula	Marathi		
2008	Baap Re Baap Dokyala Taap	-	Marathi	Cameo appearance in the song "Your Place Or Mine"	
2008	Aba Zindabad	Reshma	Marathi		
2008	Chal Gaja Karu Maja	Gaja's Girlfriend	Marathi		
2009	Hai Kai Nai Kai	Mallika Lokhande	Marathi		
2009	Chal Love Kar	Shyam's girlfriend	Marathi		
2010	Goshta Lagnanantarchi	Radha	Marathi		
2010	Kshanbhar Vishranti	Sanika	Marathi		
2010	Natarang	Nayna Kolhapurkar	Marathi		
2010	Sa Sasucha	Ashiwini	Marathi		
2010	Irada Pakka	Adhya	Marathi		
2010	Samudra	Nanda	Marathi		
2012	Ajintha	Paro	Marathi		
2013	Zapatlela 2	Megha	Marathi		
2013	Grand Masti	Mamta	Hindi	credited as Sonalee	
2014	Singham Returns	Menaka	Hindi		
2014	Rama Madhav	Anandibai	Marathi		
2015	Classmates	Aditi	Marathi		
2015	Mitwaa	Nandini	Marathi		
2015	Shutter	Hooker	Marathi		
2015	Timepass 2	-	Marathi	Cameo Appearance in the song "Madan Pichkari"	
2016	Poshter Girl	Rupali Thorat	Marathi		
2017	Baghtos Kay Mujra Kar	Gauri Bhosale	Marathi	Cameo Appearance	
2017	Tula Kalnnaar Nahi	Anjali	Marathi		
2017	Hampi	Isha	Marathi		
2019	Ti and Ti	Priyanka	Marathi		
2019	Hirkani	Hirkani	Marathi		
2019	Vicky Velingkar	Vicky Velingkar	Marathi		
2020	Dhurala	Monica Ubhe	Marathi		
2021	Jhimma	Maithili	Marathi		
2021	Pandu	Usha Chavan	Marathi		
2022	Tamasha Live	Shefali	Marathi		
2022	Mission Performance	Niyati Sharma	Hindi	Short film	
2023	Victoria - Ek Rahasya	Ankita	Marathi		
2023	Date Bhet	Ananya Pandit	Marathi		
2024	Malaikottai Vaaliban	Rangapattinam Rangarani	Malayalam		
2025	Jarann	Herself	Marathi	Cameo Appearance in the song "Jarann"	
2025	Parinati	Jharna	Marathi		
2026	Tighee	Sarika	Marathi		
2026	Salbardi	Manjula	Marathi	Cameo Appearance in the song "Manjula"	
TBA	Mogalmardini Chhatrapati Tararani †	Tarabai Bhosale	Marathi		
TBA	Raavsaaheb †	TBA	Marathi		
TBA	Rainbow †	TBA			

=== Television ===
Year	Title	Channel	Role	Ref.
2006	Ha Khel Sanchitacha	ETV Marathi		
2018	Apsara Aali	Zee Yuva	Judge	
2019-2020	Yuva Dancing Queen	Zee Yuva	Judge	
2020	Dancing Queen	Zee Marathi	Judge	
2022	Bestseller	Amazon Prime Video	S.I Urmilla Ranade	
2024	Hou De Charcha	Sun Marathi	Anchor	

== Accolades ==
Year	Awards	Category	Film	Result
2008	Maharashtra State Film Awards	Best Debut Actress	Bakula Namdeo Ghotale	Won
2008	Zee Gaurav Puraskar	Best Actress	Bakula Namdeo Ghotale	Won
2010	Maharashtracha Favourite Kon?	Popular Face of the Year	Natarang	Won
2010	Maharashtracha Favourite Kon?	Favourite Actress	Natarang	Won
2015	Zee Chitra Gaurav Puraskar	Best Actress	Mitwaa	Nominated
2015	Sanskruti Kaladarpan	Best Actress in a Leading Role	Poshter Girl	Won
2015	2nd Filmfare Awards Marathi	Best Actress	Mitwaa	Nominated
2017	4th Filmfare Awards Marathi	Best Actress	Hampi	Nominated
2019	Zee Chitra Gaurav Puraskar	Lux Golden Beauty of the Year	Ti & Ti	Won
2020	5th Filmfare Awards Marathi	Best Actress Critics	Hirkani	Won
2020	5th Filmfare Awards Marathi	Best Actress	Hirkani	Nominated
2020	Sakaal Premier Awards	Best Actress	Hirkani	Won
2020	Maharashtracha Favourite Kon?	Favourite Actress	Hirkani	Won
2020	Zee Chitra Gaurav Puraskar	Lux Golden Beauty of the Year	Hirkani	Won
2020	City Cine Awards	Best Actress	Hirkani	Won
2021	Maharashtracha Favourite Kon? Suvarnadashak Sohala	Favourite Actress of the Decade	Natarang & Hirkani	Nominated
2021	Maharashtracha Favourite Kon? Suvarnadashak Sohala	Popular Face of the Decade	Natarang & Hirkani	Won
2021	6th Filmfare Awards Marathi	Best Actress	Pandu	Nominated
2021	6th Filmfare Awards Marathi	Best Supporting Actress	Dhurala	Won
2022	Zee Talkies Comedy Awards	Best Actress	Pandu	Won
2022	City Cine Awards	Best Actress	Pandu	Won
2022	Fakt Marathi Cine Sanman	Popular Face of the Year	Tamasha Live	Won
2023	7th Filmfare Awards Marathi	Best Actress	Tamasha Live	Nominated
2023	Fakt Marathi Cine Sanman	Best Actress in a Lead Role	Victoria - Ek Rahasya	Nominated
2024	Zee Chitra Gaurav Puraskar	Most Influential Actress of the Year	Victoria - Ek Rahasya	Won
2025	Maharashtra State Film Awards	Best Actress	Tamasha Live	Nominated
