= Swapnil Munot =

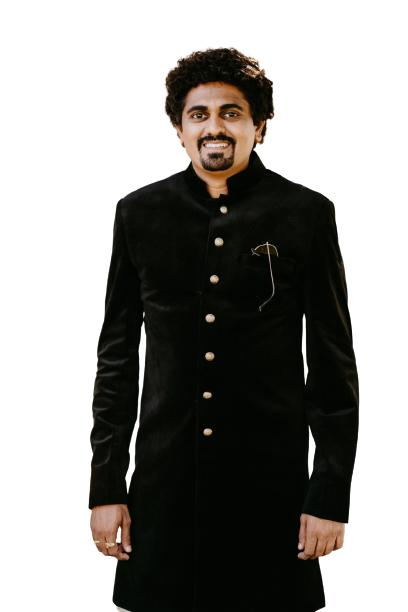
- Triple seat Premier
- Born: 2 November 1988 (age 37); Ahmednagar, Maharashtra, India
- Education: Ahmednagar College
- Occupations: Actor, Producer
- Years active: 2013-present
- Height: 175 cm (5 ft 9 in)
- Spouse: Mayoorii Munot
- Website: https://ahmednagarfilmcompany.com

Swapnil Sanjay Munot is an Indian actor & producer, known for Triple Seat (2019) Kho-Kho (2013) and Aga Bai Arechyaa 2 (2015).

== Early life ==
Swapnil born on 2 November 1988 in Ahmednagar, Maharastra and graduated from Ahmenagar college. He began his career at an early age as a child actor. He continued his interest in acting in school, college and won some awards at the state level in drama competitions.

== Career ==
He started his career in 2013 as an actor in Kedaar Shinde's movie Kho Kho later becomes a producer of Triple Seat & Zee Yuva’s serial Tuza Maza Jamtay. In 2015, he was in the production for movie named Agabai Arechya 2. Later, he started his own film production house Ahmednagar Film Company in 2016. He is the founding member of play competition, Ekankika Ahmednagar Mahakarandak and also have a Youtube channel Kadak Marathi under the banner of Kadak Entertainment.

== Filmography ==
Films
| Year | Film | Role | Credited As |
|---|---|---|---|
| 2013 | Kho Kho (film) | | Actor |
| 2015 | Aga Bai Arechyaa 2 | Devya | Actor |
| 2019 | Triple Seat | Pendru | Actor, Producer |
