= Aga Bai Arechyaa 2 =

- Directed by: Kedar Shinde
- Written by: Dilip Prabhavalkar; Kedar Shinde
- Screenplay by: Omkar Mangesh Datt
- Produced by: Narendra Firodia; Bela Shende; Sunil Lulla
- Starring: Sonali Kulkarni; Bharat Jadhav; Prasad Oak; Dharmendra Gohil; Surabhi Hande
- Cinematography: Suresh Deshmane
- Edited by: Manish Mestri
- Music by: Sai & Piyush
- Production companies: Kedar Shinde Productions; Anushka Motion Pictures & Entertainment
- Distributed by: Eros International
- Release date: 22 May 2015
- Running time: 130 minutes
- Country: India
- Language: Marathi

Aga Bai Arechyaa 2 is a 2015 Indian Marathi language film directed and co-written by Kedar Shinde. It is a sequel to the Marathi movie Aga Bai Arrecha!. The movie was produced by Narendra Firodia, Bela Shende and Sunil Lulla under the banner of Kedar Shinde Productions and Anushka Motion Pictures & Entertainment and was distributed by Eros International. The film features a cast of Sonali Kulkarni, Dharamendra Gohil, Surabhi Hande, Shivraj Waichal, Milind Fatak, Bharat Jadhav, and Prasad Oak, with Siddharth Jadhav making a special appearance. The movie was released worldwide on 22 May 2015.

== Cast ==
- Sonali Kulkarni
- Bharat Jadhav
- Siddharth Jadhav
- Prasad Oak
- Dharamendra Gohil
- Surabhi Hande
- Shivraj Waichal
- Milind Fatak,
- Uma Sardeshmukh
- Vidya Patwardhan
- Swapnil Munot
- Varun Upadhye
- Gauravi Joshi
- Maadhav Deochake
- Rajesh Bhosale
- Rajesh Singh
- Namya Saxena

== Soundtrack ==
Aga Bai Arechyaa 2

Soundtrack album by Nishaad
- Released: 8 May 2015
- Genre: Feature film soundtrack
- Length: 26:27
- Language: Marathi
- Label: Video Palace

The background score was composed by Sai & Piyush, the music composed by Nishaad, and the lyrics written by Ashwini Shende, Omkar Mangesh Datt and Manohar Golambre.

Tracklist
No.	Title	Lyrics	Singer(s)	Length
1.	"Jagnyache Bhaan He"	Ashwini Shende	Shankar Mahadevan	4:47
2.	"Ek Porgi"	Manohar Golambre	Manohar Golambre	5:09
3.	"Majha Dev Kuni pahila"	Omkar Mangesh Datt	Manohar Golambre	5:00
4.	"Full Too Fataka"	Omkar Mangesh Dutt	Adarsh Shinde	5:08
5.	"Dil Mera"	Omkar Mangesh Datt	Vaishali Samant	6:23
Total length:				26:27

== Critical reception ==
Mihir Bhanage of The Times of India gave the film a rating of 2.5 out of 5 and said that, "When you have people like Sonali, Bharat, Prasad and Milind Phatak in the cast, there are certain expectations that you go to watch the film with, considering all of them are good actors. But by the time you get to the second half of the film you are torn between high expectations and mediocre presentation. And by the end of the film, you are thoroughly disappointed." Keyur Seta of Marathi Stars gave the film a rating of 2 out of 5 saying that, "Aga Bai Arechyaa 2 fails due to basic issues. Also, the overall setting and characters appear outdated in today's era."
