= Surabhi Hande =

Indian television actress

- Born: 20 May 1991 (age 35); Jalgaon, Maharashtra, India
- Occupation: Actress
- Years active: 2011–present
- Known for: Jai Malhar
- Spouse: Durgesh Kulkarni (m. 2018)

Surabhi Hande is an Indian actress who mainly works in Marathi industry. She is known for her performance in Jai Malhar. She made her debut in Marathi films with Kedar Shinde's Aga Bai Arechyaa 2.

== Career ==
Surabhi kickstarted her career with the play Swami at a young age of 16. She worked with AIR for the 'Sugam Sangit Karyakram'. She depicted a negative role in Star Pravah's TV show Ambat Goad. Her role of the fiery Mhalsa Devi in Zee Marathi serial Jai Malhar is her most memorable role. She also appeared in the Marathi movie Aga Bai Arechyaa 2 in 2015.

== Personal life ==
Surabhi is from Jalgaon. Her father, Sanjay Hande is a personality in the music field. Surabhi also keeps singing as a hobby. Her height is 5 feet 2 inches and has studied in Jalgaon, Maharashtra state. She got married with Durgesh Kulkarni in 2018.

== Filmography ==
=== Television ===
Year	Title	Role	Notes	Ref.
2012-2013	Aambat Goad	Shraddha	Debut character role	
2014-2017	Jai Malhar	Mhalsa Devi	Lead role	
2015	Home Minister	Herself	Special appearance	
2015	Chala Hawa Yeu Dya	Herself	Guest as Mhalsa Devi	
2018-2019	Lakshmi Sadaiv Mangalam	Aarvi	Lead role	
2018	Bigg Boss Marathi 1	Herself	Guest appearance	
2021	Gatha Navnathanchi	Saptashrungi Devi	Character role	

=== Films ===
Year	Title	Role	Notes	Ref.
2015	Aga Bai Arechyaa 2	Young Shubhangi	Film debut	
2020	Bhootatlela	Shivani	Lead role (Web series)	
2024	Sangharsh Yoddha Manoj Jarange Patil	Jarange's wife	Based on Manoj Jarange Patil	
2024	Mogalmardini Chhatrapati Tararani			

=== Music album ===
Year	Title	label	Notes	Ref.
2020	Kshan He Ka Lamble	Saptsur Music	Song debut	

=== Plays ===
- Swami
