= Dhondi Champya - Ek Prem Katha =

- Theatrical release poster
- Directed by: Dnyanesh Bhalekar
- Screenplay by: Dnyanesh Bhalekar; Sagar Kesarkar
- Story by: Dnyanesh Bhalekar; Sagar Kesarkar
- Produced by: Suunil Jaiin; Aditya Joshi; Venessa Roy; Aditya Shastri
- Starring: Bharat Jadhav; Vaibhav Mangle; Nikhil Chavan; Sayli Patil
- Edited by: Ashish Arjun Gaikar
- Music by: Saurabh Shetye; Durgesh Khot
- Production companies: Fifth Dimension; Cult Digital
- Distributed by: Reliance Entertainment
- Release date: 16 December 2022
- Country: India
- Language: Marathi

Dhondi Champya - Ek Prem Katha is an Indian Marathi language movie. starring Bharat Jadhav and Vaibhav Mangale, Nikhil Chavan, Sayli Patil in the lead. directed by Dnyanesh Bhalekar. Released in theatres on 16 Dec 2022

== Cast ==
- Bharat Jadhav
- Vaibhav Mangle
- Nikhil Chavan
- Sayli Patil
- Sneha Raikar
- Shalaka Pawar
- Kamalakar Satpute
- Sayli Sudhakar
- Prashant Vichare
- Prabhakar More
- Samir Choughule
- Nandkishor Chaughule
