= Dancing Queen (2020 Indian TV series) =

Marathi-language reality dance show

- Starring: Adwait Dadarkar; Sonalee Kulkarni; RJ Malishka
- Country of origin: India
- Original language: Marathi
- No. of episodes: 43

Production
- Executive producer: Sandeep Arjun Kamble
- Camera setup: Multi-camera
- Running time: 22 minutes

Original release
- Network: Zee Marathi
- Release: 24 September – 27 December 2020

Related
- Yuva Dancing Queen

Dancing Queen - Size Large, Full Charge is an Indian Marathi language television reality dance show which aired on Zee Marathi. It was hosted by Adwait Dadarkar and judged by Sonalee Kulkarni and RJ Malishka. The show premiered on 24 September 2020 and ended on 27 December 2020 with the Grand Finale after completing 43 episodes.

== Finalists ==
- Pranali Chavan (Winner)
- Apoorva Undalkar
- Sangeeta Tamata
- Sneha Deshmukh
- Deepali Nemale
- Dipti Nair
