= Rajendra Chawla =

Indian actor

Rajendra Chawla is an Indian actor. He is predominantly known for his roles in the films A Wednesday!, Mumbai Mirror, M.S. Dhoni: The Untold Story, and Paisa Paisa, and the television series Saas Bina Sasural, Ghar Ki Lakshmi Betiyann, Maat Pitaah Ke Charnon Mein Swarg, Sanskaar – Dharohar Apnon Ki, and Bahu Hamari Rajni Kant.

In 2020, he was seen in Sony SAB's Tera Yaar Hoon Main.

== Filmography ==
=== Television ===
List of television appearances, with year, title, and role shown
Year	Title	Role	Notes
1998	Cincinnati Bubblaboo		
1998	Family No.1	Prakash	Episode 41
2002	Kammal	Narayan Jajoo	
2002–2006	Astitva...Ek Prem Kahani	Bhavani Shankar	
2006	Ghar Ki Lakshmi Betiyann	Rasik Bhai	
2007	Sapna Babul Ka...Bidaai	Kamlesh Awasthy	
2007	Aahat	Advocate	Seasons 3–4
2009	Maat Pitaah Ke Charnon Mein Swarg	Chandar	
2011	Devon Ke Dev...Mahadev	Acharya Gyanmurti	
2012	Saas Bina Sasural	Pashupatinath Chaturvedi	
2013	Sanskaar – Dharohar Apnon Ki	Hasmukhlal Dhansukhlal Vaishnav	
2016	Bahu Hamari Rajni Kant	Amrish Kant	
2017	Dhhai Kilo Prem	Dev Mishra	
2018–2019	Yeh Un Dinon Ki Baat Hai	Kamlesh Maheshwari	
2019	Ek Bhram Sarvagun Sampanna	Anupam Chopra	
2019	Mere Dad Ki Dulhan	Dr. Pandey	
2020–2022	Tera Yaar Hoon Main	Pratap Ratan Bansal	
2022–2023	Banni Chow Home Delivery	Devraj Singh Rathore	
2024	Mera Balam Thanedaar	Vardhan Singh	
2024	Freedom at Midnight	Sardar Vallabhbhai Patel	
2025	Crime Beat	NK Rawat	
2025	Pati Brahmachari	Aravind Kumar Singh	
2026	Lakshmi Niwas	Srinivas Jaiswal	

=== Film ===
- All films are in Hindi, unless otherwise noted.

List of film appearances, with year, title, and role shown
Year	Title	Role	Notes
2008	A Wednesday!	Jaishankar Tiwary	
2009	Suno Na.. Ek Nanhi Aawaz	Dr. Rudra Sahani	
2013	Mumbai Mirror		
2016	M.S. Dhoni: The Untold Story	Mr. Somi	
2016	Paisa Paisa		Marathi
2018	Batti Gul Meter Chalu	Janak Khanduri	
2019	Ujda Chaman	Mr. Batra	
2022	Looop Lapeta	Shree Mamlesh Charan Chaddhaji	
2024	Vedaa	Vedaa's father	
