= London Misal =

- Theatrical release poster
- Directed by: Jalindar Kumbhar
- Screenplay by: Omkar Mangesh Datt
- Story by: Jalindar Kumbhar
- Produced by: Amit Basnet; Suresh Govindray Pai; Aaron Basnet
- Starring: Bharat Jadhav; Rutuja Bagwe; Ritika Shrotri; Madhuri Pawar; Gaurav More; Nikhil Chavan; Rituraj Shinde; Sunil Godbole
- Cinematography: Uday Singh Mohite
- Edited by: Manish Shirke
- Music by: Vaishali Samant; Rohit Raut; Vaishnavi Sriram
- Production companies: AB International; Mahalsa Entertainment; London Missal Limited
- Distributed by: Filmastra Studios
- Release date: 8 December 2023
- Country: India
- Language: Marathi

London Misal is an Indian Marathi-language drama film directed by Jalindar Kumbhar, with the screenplay and dialogues written by Omkar Mangesh Dutt. The film stars Bharat Jadhav, Rutuja Bagwe, Ritika Shrotri, Madhuri Pawar, Gaurav More, Nikhil Chavan, Rituraj Shinde, and Sunil Godbole in lead roles. Vaishali Samant, Rohit Raut, Vaishnavi Sriram have composed the music for the film. The duo Sai-Piyush has made the background music, while songs of the film are written by Mandar Cholkar, Mangesh Kangane and Sameer Samant.

== Plot ==
The plot follows the story of two sisters who want to fulfil their father's unfinished dream.

== Cast ==
- Bharat Jadhav as Jagannath
- Rutuja Bagwe as Aditi/Aditya
- Ritika Shrotri as Reva/Ravindra
- Madhuri Pawar as Shivani
- Gaurav More as Madhav
- Nikhil Chavan as Sameer
- Rituraj Shinde as Ranjan
- Sunil Godbole as Kamat
- Sammy Jonas Heaney as Firangi

== Release ==
The film was released theatrically on 8 December 2023 throughout Maharashtra. Initially it was scheduled to be released on 27 October 2023.

== Reception ==
Anub George of The Times of India rated 2.0/5 and wrote "London Misal is a no-brainer that suffers due to a predictable plot." Film Information noted that Jalindar Gangaram Kumbhar's direction is mediocre. The music is unremarkable, with the title song being just decent. Sai-Piyush's background score lacks impact. Uday Singh Mohite's cinematography is considered average, while the art direction is appropriate. Editing by Manish Shirke could have benefited from a tighter approach.
