= Gauri (2006 film) =

- Theatrical release poster
- Directed by: Vijay Bhanu
- Produced by: Gajanan Dongre
- Starring: Sonalee Kulkarni; Kuldeep Pawar; Priya Berde; Pradeep Velankar; Kalpana Sathe; Raghavendra Kadkol; Vikram Gokhale
- Music by: Sanjay Geete
- Release date: 1 December 2006
- Country: India
- Language: Marathi

Gauri is a Marathi movie released on 1 December 2006. The movie has been produced by Gajanan Dongre and directed by Vijay Bhanu.

== Cast ==
The cast includes Sonalee Kulkarni, Kuldeep Pawar, Vikram Gokhale, Priya Berde, Pradeep Velankar, Kalpana Sathe, Raghavendra Kadkol and Others

== Soundtrack ==
The music has been directed by Sanjay Geete.
