= Hirkani =

Marathi language historical drama film

- First look poster
- Directed by: Prasad Oak
- Written by: Chinmay Mandlekar
- Produced by: Falguni Patel
- Starring: Sonalee Kulkarni; Chinmay Mandlekar
- Cinematography: Sanjay K. Memane
- Music by: Amitraj
- Production company: Irada Entertainment
- Distributed by: Sunshine Studios
- Release date: 24 October 2019
- Running time: 99 minutes
- Country: India
- Language: Marathi
- Box office: ₹14 crore

Hirkani (transl. Small diamond) is a 2019 Indian Marathi language historical drama film directed by Prasad Oak and produced by Falguni Patel under the banner of Irada Entertainment with Lawrence D'Souza as co-producer. The film is bankrolled by Rajesh Mapuskar. The film stars Sonalee Kulkarni in title role of 'Hirkani', a brave woman and an amazing mother who lived near the Raigad Fort in Maharashtra during the regime Chhatrapati Shivaji Maharaj. The film also features Chinmay Mandlekar in a cameo role. The film is second directorial of Prasad Oak. The music of the film is composed by Amitraj and the soundtrack includes a devotional song by Asha Bhosle.

The filming of the historical drama began on 2 June 2019. It was theatrically released on 24 October 2019. Hirkani grossed around ₹14 crore at Box office.

== Plot ==
Hirkani was living near Raigad fort. The fort was captured by Chhatrapati Shivaji Maharaj and made its capital in 1674. The fort is situated in the hills of the Western Ghats and is surrounded on all sides by fortified ramparts.

The village at the foot of the hill was a source of daily trade for the citizens living in the fort premises.

The villagers set up a hill near the gate of the fort, which was opened in the morning to sell their wares, and it was closed every evening, and the gates were not to be opened to anyone until the next morning.

Like everyone else, Hirkani used to stand in line at the main entrance every morning. One such day, while preparing to go to the fort, Hirkani was late because of her child. Hirkani was going to the market every day and she was selling milk to her regular customers. Unfortunately, it was too late for her to reach the gate in the evening and the gate was already closed at sunset by Mawla's charge.

She had left her son at home, Hirkani did not try to plead with Mawla, who did not think, and all the value of Chhatrapati's order would have to be weighed. When the baby thought she was alone and hungry, Hirkani did something she had never done before.

She descended the fort and while descending the fort she got itchy and got injured from a rocky outcrop.

The next day Hirkani was at the gate of the fort for the daily market. Mavala was shocked to see the gatekeeper entering the door. He immediately took her to Chhatrapati Shivaji Maharaj for allegedly breaking the rules. Chhatrapati Shivaji Maharaj heard her story and then saw scratches on her hands and face.

Instead of punishing Hirkani, he praised her courage and immediately ordered a wall to be built on the unsafe vertical drop and named it after her.

== Cast ==
- Sonalee Kulkarni as Hirkani
- Makrand Deshpande as Bahirji Naik
- Ameet Khedekar as Jiva
- Prasad Oak as Chhatrapati Shivaji Maharaj
- Jitendra Joshi as Fakir
- Vimal Mhatre as Hirkani's mother in law
- Aishwarya Rajesh as Chandra
- Hemant Dhome as Shahir
- Sakshi Gandhi as Saibai
- Suhas Joshi as Jijabai
- Mehul as Vaal
- Chinmay Mandlekar
- Kshitee Jog
- Siddharth Chandekar
- Priyadarshan Jadhav
- Rajshree Thakur
- Pushkar Shrotri

== Production ==
The film presents the historical story of a mother, from the period of Chhatrapati Shivaji Maharaj, who scaled down the steep edges of the Raigad fort to reach out to her baby, not caring for her own life. Her courage was honoured with the title 'Hirkani'. The director Prasad Oak and writer Chinmay Mandlekar cast Sonalee Kulkarni in title role of Hirkani. The principal photography began on 1 January 2019.

== Release ==
The film was theatrically released on 24 October 2019.

== Soundtrack ==
Hirkani

Soundtrack album by Amitraj
- Released: 22 October 2019
- Recorded: 2019
- Studio: AJIVASAN Sound Studio
- Genre: Feature film soundtrack
- Length: 22:56
- Language: Marathi
- Label: Zee Music Company

Amitraj chronology
Party (2018)	Hirkani (2019)
External audio
- Audio Jukebox on YouTube

The songs for the film are composed by Amitraj and lyrics by Kavibhushan, Sandeep Khare and Sanjay Krishnaji Patil.

Track list
No.	Title	Lyrics	Singer(s)	Length
1.	"Shivrajyabhishek Geet" (Female chorus singers: Aarohi Mhatre, Pragati Joshi, Mrunmayee Dadke, Rucha Soman, Manasi Datare & Sonal Naik and Male chorus singers: Pratap Kalke, Santosh Bote, Vivek Naik, Sagar Lele, Rahul Chitnis & Mangesh Shirke Rythm)	Kavibhushan and Sandeep Khare	Neelambari Kirkire, Vivek Naik, Amitraj, Deepali Desai, Jiya Suresh Wadkar, Gaurav Chati and Santosh Bote	9:43
2.	"Jagana He Nyara Jhala Ji"	Sanjay Krishnaji Patil	Amitraj, Madhura Kumbhar	4:29
3.	"Surat Aala Urat Aala"	Sanjay Krishnaji Patil	Avadhoot Gupte Madhura Kumbhar	3:32
4.	"Aaichi Aarti"	Sandeep Khare	Asha Bhosle	5:12
Total length:				22:56

== Accolades ==
Year	Award	Category	Nominee	Result	Ref.
2021	Filmfare Marathi Awards	Best Film	Prasad Oak	Nominated	
2021	Filmfare Marathi Awards	Best Director	Prasad Oak	Nominated	
2021	Filmfare Marathi Awards	Best Music Director	Amitraj	Nominated	
2021	Filmfare Marathi Awards	Best Lyricist	Sanjay Patil "Jagan he nyaar"	Nominated	
2021	Filmfare Marathi Awards	Best Actress	Sonalee Kulkarni	Nominated	
2021	Filmfare Marathi Awards	Best Actress Critics	Sonalee Kulkarni	Won	
2021	Filmfare Marathi Awards	Best Female Playback Singer	Madhura Kumbhar "Jagan he nyaar"	Nominated	
2021	Filmfare Marathi Awards	Best Editing	Apurva Motiwale Sahay, Ashish Mhatre	Nominated	
2021	Filmfare Marathi Awards	Best Background Score	Narendra Bhide	Nominated	
2021	Filmfare Marathi Awards	Best Costume Design	Poornima Oak	Nominated	
57th Maharashtra State Film Awards	Maharashtra State Film Awards	Best Lyricist	Sanjay Patil "Abhalasang Matich nandan"	Won	
57th Maharashtra State Film Awards	Maharashtra State Film Awards	Best Music Director	Amitraj	Won	
57th Maharashtra State Film Awards	Maharashtra State Film Awards	Best Playback Singer Female	Madhura Kumbhar "Abhalasang Matich nandan"	Won	
57th Maharashtra State Film Awards	Maharashtra State Film Awards	Best Choreography	Subhash Nakashe "Rajyabhishek Geet"	Won	
