= Darling (2021 film) =

2021 Indian romantic film

- Theatrical release poster
- Directed by: Sameer Asha Patil
- Written by: Sameer Asha Patil
- Produced by: Arundhati Dhupe; Amit Dhupe; Vandana Patke Thakur; Ajay Thakur; V. J. Shalaka; Nikhil V. Khajindar; Sameer Asha Patil
- Starring: Prathamesh Parab; Ritika Shrotri; Nikhil Chavan
- Cinematography: M Dhawal
- Edited by: Vaibhaw Pratap Singh
- Music by: Abhinay Jagtap
- Production companies: 7 Horse Entertainment Pvt Ltd; V.Patke Films; Kathakar Motion Pictures
- Distributed by: Pickle Entertainment
- Release date: 10 December 2021
- Running time: 156
- Country: India
- Language: Marathi

Darling is a 2021 Indian Marathi language romantic comedy film written and directed by Sameer Asha Patil under the banner of 7 Horse Entertainment Pvt Ltd., V.Patke Films and Kathakar Motion Pictures. The film starring Prathamesh Parab, Ritika Shrotri and Nikhil Chavan depicts the comic love story of three characters in a village of Maharashtra. It was theatrically released on 10 December 2021.

== Plot ==
Babli, a spirited individual born into a prosperous family, went missing one night, prompting a collective search. In an inebriated state, she found herself outside the residence of her romantic interest, Tushar, expressing her desire for immediate marriage. However, Tushar, apprehensive about familial repercussions, did not appear the following morning. Subsequently, Babli severed contact with him and informed her family of her willingness to marry a suitor of their choosing.

Upon consulting the family astrologer, Aditya from Mumbai emerged as a prospective match, seeking a bride from a rural background. Both families expressed mutual interest, and arrangements were made for a meeting. The astrologer, however, foresaw potential obstacles, identifying not only Tushar but also Rajabhau—a seemingly idle individual with a penchant for a lavish lifestyle.

Despite the foreseen challenges, Babli and Aditya agreed to proceed with their marriage. Tushar attempted to reconcile with Babli through unidentified phone numbers, leading them to contemplate rekindling their relationship and eloping. Simultaneously, Rajabhau, unaware of Tushar's involvement, also reached out to Babli from an unknown number, believing her to be a companion of Tushar seeking his assistance in their elopement. This intricate web of misconceptions set the stage for a complex series of events in the lead-up to Babli and Aditya's impending union.

== Cast ==
- Prathamesh Parab as Tushar
- Ritika Shrotri as Babli
- Nikhil Chavan
- Mangesh Kadam
- Aabha Velankar
- Jaywant Wadkar
- Amey Barve
- Sunil Deo
- Harsha Gupte
- Umesh Bolake
- Santosh Padmini Mane (special appearance)
- Anand Ingale

== Release ==
The film was initially slated to release on 7 January 2021 but pushed to 26 January, which was also postponed due to COVID-19 pandemic. It was released theatrically on 10 December 2021 by Pickle Entertainment.

== Soundtrack ==
Darling

Soundtrack album by Chinar - Mahesh
- Released: 10 November 2020
- Recorded: 2020
- Genre: Feature film soundtrack
- Length: 13:36
- Language: Marathi
- Label: Video Palace
External audio
- Official audio
- Darling - Full Album on Gaana

Soundtrack of the film is composed by Chinar - Mahesh and lyrics are penned by Sameer Samant, Mandar Cholkar, Mangesh Kangane and Mahesh Ogale. The songs are sung by Ravindra Khomne, Shubhangi Kedar, Chinar Kharkar and Sonali Patel.

Track listing
No.	Title	Lyrics	Singer(s)	Length
1.	"Darling Tu" (Chorus : Vivek Naik)	Sameer Samant, Mahesh Ogale	Ravindra Khomne	3:26
2.	"Ye Hai Pyar"	Mangesh Kangane	Sonali Patel, Chinar Kharkar	4:40
3.	"Manacha Pakharu"	Mandar Cholkar	Shubhangi Kedar	5:30
Total length:				13:36
