= RJ Malishka =

Indian radio personality

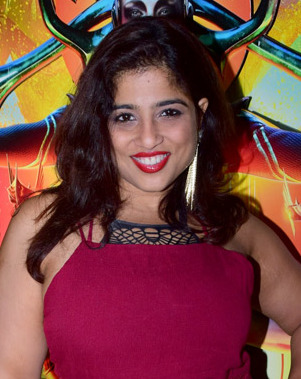
- Born: Malishka Mendonsa; Mumbai, India
- Other name: RJ Malishka
- Education: Sophia College for Women
- Occupation: radio jockey

Malishka Mendonsa, popularly known as RJ Malishka, is an Indian radio personality. She participated in the YouTube Originals series Pretty Fit hosted by Prajakta Koli. Malishka hosts Morning No. 1 with Malishka on the Red FM 93.5 radio station.

== Biography ==
=== Early life ===
Malishka was born and brought up in Mumbai, India. She completed her schooling at St. Charles High School. Having lost her father at an early age, she was raised by her mother Lily Mendonsa. She claims to have gone from "galli" to global." She graduated with a Bachelor of Arts degree in political science from St. Xavier College, University of Mumbai. After a year's break, she did her Master of Arts in Mass Communication at Sophia College for Women in Mumbai.

=== Career ===
Malishka started her career as a radio jockey. Her Red FM 93.5 show "Morning No 1 with Malishka", in particular, won the "Best Breakfast Programme/Show (Hindi) at the Indian Excellence in Radio Awards" in 2010. In 2010 she also hosted a travel show on Fox Traveller titled, It Happens only in India. She has also done shows like Best Breakfast Programme and M Bole Toh. On 13 July 2014, Malishka entered the dance reality show Jhalak Dikhhla Jaa 7 as a wild card contestant but was eliminated in the 9th week of the program. Bollywood actress Vidya Balan was trained by Malishka for playing the role of an RJ in the 2006 Bollywood film Lage Raho Munnabhai. She later played the role of a radio jockey in the 2017 Bollywood film Tumhari Sulu starring Vidya Balan.

Malishka published a song on YouTube about problems people face during Mumbai's monsoon season every year, including potholes, traffic jams, and railway disruptions. The song was themed around the question "Mumbai, do you trust the BMC?" and referred to the Brihanmumbai Municipal Corporation (BMC). With the success of the song, in 2018, she published a new song targeting the BMC. Subsequently, in 2019, the BMC invited Malishka for road inspection where she was explained about the functioning of the civic body and how it takes up efforts to maintain city roads during the monsoons.

In 2020, she participated in Fear Factor: Khatron Ke Khiladi 10; she was eliminated in the 4th week of the program.

== Dubbing roles ==
=== Live action films ===
| Film title | Actress | Character | Dub Language | Original Language | Original Year Release | Dub Year Release |
|---|---|---|---|---|---|---|
| Thor: Ragnarok | Tessa Thompson | Valkyrie / Scrapper 142 | Hindi | English | 2017 | 2017 |
| Avengers: Endgame | Tessa Thompson | Valkyrie | Hindi | English | 2019 | 2019 |
| Thor: Love and Thunder | Tessa Thompson | Valkyrie | Hindi | English | 2022 | 2022 |
| The Marvels | Tessa Thompson | Valkyrie | Hindi | English | 2023 | 2023 |

=== Animated films ===
| Film title | Original Voice(s) | Character(s) | Dub Language | Original Language | Original Year release | Dub Year release |
|---|---|---|---|---|---|---|
| The Incredibles | Elizabeth Peña | Mirage (Mona) | Hindi | English | 2004 | 2004 |
| Inside Out 2 | Maya Hawke | Anxiety (Inside Out) | Hindi | English | 2024 | 2024 |

=== As actress ===
| Year | Name | Role |
|---|---|---|
| 2017 | Tumhari Sulu | RJ Albeli Anjali |

== Filmography ==
=== Television ===
| Year | Name | Role | Channel | Notes |
|---|---|---|---|---|
| 2010 | It Happens only in India | Host | Fox Traveller | |
| 2014 | Jhalak Dikhhla Jaa 7 | Contestant | Colors TV | 9th place |
| 2020 | Fear Factor: Khatron Ke Khiladi 10 | Contestant | Colors TV | 9th place |
| 2020 | Dancing Queen Size Large, Full Charge | Judge | Zee Marathi | |

=== Web series ===
| Year | Name | Role | Platform |
|---|---|---|---|
| 2018 | XXX | Kinky | ALTBalaji |
| 2024 | Freedom at Midnight | Sarojini Naidu | SonyLIV |
