= MFK Award for Popular Face of the Year =

Indian film award

Maharashtracha Favourite Kon? for Popular Face of the Year
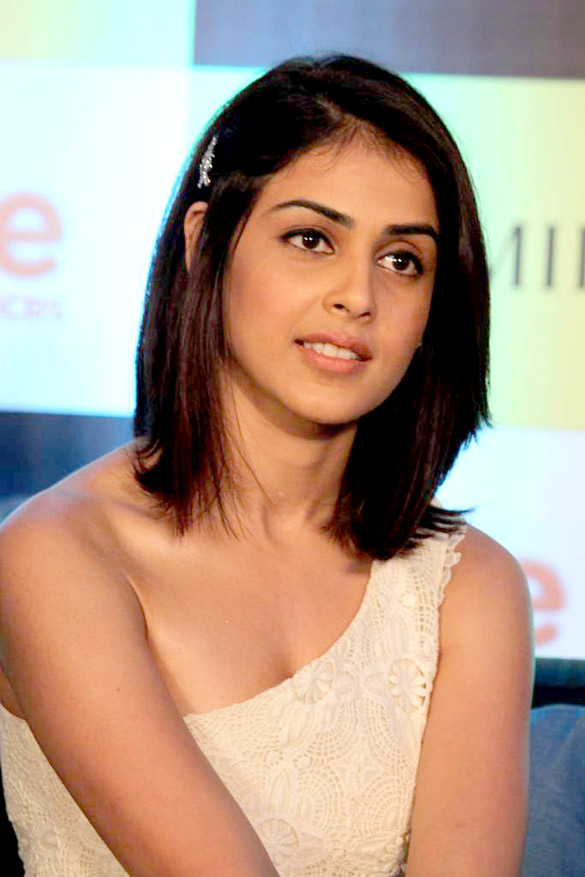
- Awarded for: Popular Face of the Year
- Country: India
- Presented by: Zee Talkies
- First award: Sai Tamhankar
- Currently held by: Genelia Deshmukh

The Popular Face of the Year is an award in India given by Zee Talkies as part of its annual Maharashtracha Favourite Kon? ceremony for Marathi films. The award was first given in 2009.

== Winners and nominees ==
Year	Photos of winners	Actor	Ref.
2009		Sai Tamhankar †	
2009		Hemangi Kavi	
2009		Siyaa Patil	
2010		Sonalee Kulkarni	
2010		Amruta Khanvilkar	
2010		Priya Bapat	
2011		Kranti Redkar	
2011		Tejaswini Pandit	
2011		Urmila Kothare	
2012		Ketaki Mategaonkar	
2012		Amruta Khanvilkar	
2012		Sai tamhankar	
2013		Sai tamhankar	
2014		Amruta Khanvilkar	
2015		Priya Bapat	
2015		Amruta Khanvilkar	
2015		Spruha Joshi	
2015		Sai tamhankar	
2015		Sonalee Kulkarni	
2015		Pooja Sawant	
2016		Rinku Rajguru	
2016		Sonalee Kulkarni	
2016		Amruta Khanvilkar	
2016		Sai tamhankar	
2016		Pooja Sawant	
2016		Spruha Joshi	
2017		Sai Tamhankar	
2018		Vaidehi Parashurami	
2018		Sai tamhankar	
2018		Mithila Palkar	
2018		Mrunal Thakur	
2018		Sonalee Kulkarni	
2018		Mrunmayee Deshpande	
2019		Shivani Surve	
2019		Sai tamhankar	
2019		Amruta Khanvilkar	
2019		Rinku Rajguru	
2019		Sonalee Kulkarni	
2019		Vaidehi Parashurami	
2021		Sonalee Kulkarni	
2021		Kranti Redkar	
2021		Ketaki Mategaonkar	
2021		Amruta Khanvilkar	
2021		Sai Tamhankar	
2021		Priya Bapat	
2021		Rinku Rajguru	
2021		Vaidehi Parashurami	
2021		Shivani Surve	
2022		Hruta Durgule	
2022		Amruta Khanvilkar	
2022		Sonalee Kulkarni	
2022		Pooja Sawant	
2022		Sai Tamhankar	
2022		Vaidehi Parashurami	
2023		Genelia Deshmukh	
2023		Sonalee Kulkarni	
2023		Sai Tamhankar	
2023		Amruta Khanvilkar	
2023		Shivani Surve	
2023		Sayali Sanjeev	
2023		Rinku Rajguru	
2023		Vaidehi Parashurami	
