= Mogalmardini Chhatrapati Tararani =

Marathi-language historical film

- First look poster
- Directed by: Rahul Jadhav
- Written by: Dr. Jaisinghrao Pawar; Dr. Sudhir Nikam
- Based on: "Mogalmardini Maharani Tarabai" by Dr. Jaisinghrao Pawar
- Produced by: Akshay Bardapurkar; Deepa Tracy
- Starring: Sonalee Kulkarni; Aashay Kulkarni; Surabhi Hande
- Cinematography: Rahul Jadhav
- Edited by: Parth Bhatt
- Music by: Avadhoot Gupte
- Production companies: Planet Marathi; Mantra Vision
- Country: India
- Language: Marathi

Mogalmardini Chhatrapati Tararani is an unreleased Indian Marathi-language war drama film directed by Rahul Jadhav in his directorial debut and produced by Akshay Bardapurkar and Deepa Tracy under Planet Marathi and Mantra Vision. The film stars Sonalee Kulkarni in the title role, alongside Aashay Kulkarni and Surabhi Hande. The story of the Maratha queen Maharani Tarabai Bhosale is based on the book Mogalmardini Maharani Tarabai written by author and historian Dr. Jaysingrao Pawar.

The film was scheduled to be released in theaters on 22 March 2024, but has been postponed.

== Cast ==
- Sonalee Kulkarni as Maharani Tarabai Bhosale
- Aashay Kulkarni
- Surabhi Hande

== Production ==
The principal photography was started in mid-August 2022.

== Soundtrack ==
The music is composed by Avadhoot Gupte, and the background music is given by Dr. Ashish More.

== Release and marketing ==
The makers released the teaser for the film in early March 2023. The new poster of the film was unveiled at Ram Mandir in Wadala, Mumbai, during the consecration ceremony of Pran Pratishtha of Ram Mandir in Ayodhya.

The film was initially scheduled to be released on Diwali 2022, then 22 March 2024 and again postponed.
