= Madhyamvarg: The Middle Class =

- First Look Poster
- मध्यमवर्ग - द मिड्डल क्लास
- Directed by: Harry Fernandes
- Produced by: Smt. Lakshmi Babaji Aanjarlekar; Sanjay Gopal Chhabria
- Starring: Siddharth Jadhav; Ravi Kishan; Anant Jog; Nayana Apte; Sujata Joshi; Kashmira Kulkarni; Hemangi Kaaz; Alan Fernandes; Tanwi Gouri Mehta
- Cinematography: Shafeeq Shaikh
- Music by: Gunvant Sen; Salil Amrute
- Release date: 12 December 2014
- Running time: 100 minutes
- Country: India
- Language: Marathi
- Budget: ₹2.43 crore (US$290,000)

Madhyamvarg: The Middle Class (Marathi: मध्यमवर्ग - द मिड्डल क्लास) is a 2014 Marathi film starring Siddharth Jadhav and Ravi Kishan in lead roles. The film is a story about the fight of middle-class people against the bad things in the society. The film marks the debut of Bhojpuri actor Ravi Kishan in Marathi Film Industry.

== Plot ==
The story revolves around a Police Inspector (Siddharth Jadhav) and a journalist (Ravi Kishan) and his family. It tells the fight of middle-class people against injustice and bad things.

== Cast ==
- Siddharth Jadhav as Inspector Vijay Raut
- Ravi Kishan as Yashwant, Journalist
- Anant Jog as Minister
- Raj Khatri as Chandan, Minister's Brother
- Nayana Apte
- Sujata Joshi
- Kashmira Kulkarni as Priya
- Hemangi Kaaj
- Kishore Nandalaskar
- Vasant Anjarlekar
- Ramesh Vani
- Anil Gawas
- Tanwi Gouri Mehta as Tanu
- Allan Fernandes as Manu
- Dr. Dilip Potnis as Chief Editor

== Release ==
The film was released on 12 December 2014 all over Maharashtra. First Look Teaser of the film was released on 13 November 2014 on YouTube. Official Trailer was launched on 27 November 2014. The film clashed with three other Marathi films viz. Love Factor, Mismatch, and Premasathi Coming Suun.

== Soundtrack ==
The music was composed by Gunvant Sen, with lyrics penned by Babasaheb Saudagar, Savta Gavali and Harry Fernandes.

Madhyamvarg – The Middle class

Soundtrack album by Gunvant Sen Salil Amrute
- Released: 15 November 2014
- Genre: Feature film soundtrack
- Language: Marathi
- Label: MGR Music

No.	Title	Singer(s)	Lyrics	Length
1	"Dili Kombadyane Baag"	Bappi Lahiri & Kalpana	Harry Fernandes	4:42
2	"Anandane Ithe Nandate"	Swapnil Bandodkar, P. Ganesh, Anupam Sharma, Vaishali Made, Supriya Pathak & Nayana Apte	Savata Gawali	5:16
3	"Nashibacha Khel"	Shaan, Priya Bhattacharya	Babasaheb Saudagar	5:03
4	"Navawari Saree Mein"	Vaishali Samant	Savata Gawali	4:22
5	"Zhale Shaheed"	Roop Kumar Rathod	Babasaheb Saudagar	6:55
6	"Zhale Shaheed" (Duet)	Roop Kumar Rathod & Sadhna Sargam	Babasaheb Saudagar	7:04
7	"Ha Parivar"	Swapnil Bandodkar	Savata Gawali	5:25
