= Paisa Paisa (2016 film) =

2016 Marathi film directed by Joji Raechal

- Film poster
- Directed by: Joji Reachal Job
- Written by: Sachin Darekar
- Produced by: Shiv Vilash Chaurasiya
- Starring: Sachit Patil; Milind Shinde; Ashish Newalkar; Spruha Joshi; Vinita Joshi
- Cinematography: S Prasad
- Edited by: Nand Kumar
- Music by: Shushmit Limaye; Shoham Pathak
- Production company: The Nine Films
- Distributed by: Indian Film Studios
- Release date: 20 May 2016
- Running time: 110 minutes
- Country: India
- Language: Marathi

Paisa Paisa is a 2016 emotional thriller film directed by Joji Raechal Job and produced by Shiv Vilash Chaurasiya under banner of The Nine Films. The film stars Sachit Patil, Rajendra Chawla and Spruha Joshi. It was released theatrically on 20 May 2016.

== Plot ==
The story takes place in two cities, Mumbai and Nagpur. The film takes place over the course of four hours. Rajiv (Ashish Newalkar) goes to Nagpur for an interview but falls into a trap in the few minutes he leaves the office to make a phone call. Desperate for money, he contacts his friend Ajay for help. Ajay who is in Mumbai, is having troubles with his own wife. She, Janhvi, is returning to him after having divorced. Ajay sets aside his plans to reconcile with his wife to help his friend, but ultimately fails to gather enough money to help Rajiv.

== Cast ==
- Sachit Patil as Ajay
- Ashish Newalkar as Rajiv
- Spruha Joshi as Janhavi
- Vinita Joshi as Neha
- Milind Shinde
- Deepali Stayed as Rickshaw Driver's Wife
- Pushkar Shrotri
- Pankaj Vishnu
- Rajendra Chawla
