= Triple Seat =

Marathi language romantic comedy film

- Theatrical release poster
- Directed by: Sanket Prakash Pavse
- Written by: Abhijit Arvind Dalvi
- Story by: Abhishek
- Produced by: Narendra Shantikumar Firodiya; Swapnil Munot
- Starring: Ankush Chaudhari; Shivani Surve; Pallavi Patil
- Cinematography: Pushpank Gawade
- Edited by: Mayur Hardas
- Music by: Avinash-Vishwajeet
- Production companies: Anushka Motion Pictures & Entertainments; Ahmednagar Film Company
- Distributed by: AA Films
- Release date: 25 October 2019
- Country: India
- Language: Marathi

Triple Seat is a 2019 Indian Marathi language romantic comedy film directed by Sanket Prakash Pavse and produced by Narendra Shantikumar Firodiya under the banner of Anushka Motion Pictures & Entertainment and Ahmednagar Film Company with Swapnil Sanjay Munot as co-producer. The film starring Ankush Chaudhari, Shivani Surve and Pallavi Patil follows the story of a couple (played by Ankush Chaudhari and Shivani Surve) with a third angle (played by Pallavi Patil) to form a love triangle in a cross connection of wireless love.

The music of the film is composed by Avinash-Vishwajeet, the soundtrack was released on 17 October 2019. The film was theatrically released on 25 October 2019.

== Cast ==
- Ankush Chaudhari as Krishna
- Shivani Surve as Meeera
- Pallavi Patil as Vrunda
- Pravin Tarde
- Rakesh Bedi
- Vidyadhar Joshi
- Vaibhav Mangle as Meera's Father
- Swapnil Munot
- Yogesh Shirsath
- Shilpa Thakre
- Poonam Chaudhary - Patil

== Production ==
The film was publicly announced in August 2019, with cast of Ankush Chaudhari, Shivani Surve, Pallavi Patil and Pravin Tarde. The film to be directed by Sanket Prakash Pavse and produced by Narendra Shantikumar Firodiya.

== Release ==
The official teaser was launched by Rajshri Marathi on 21 September 2019. The official trailer was launched by LetsUp Music on 22 October 2019.

The film was theatrically released on 25 October 2019.

== Soundtrack ==
Triple Seat

Soundtrack album by Avinash-Vishwajeet
- Released: 17 October 2019
- Recorded: 2019
- Genre: Feature film soundtrack
- Length: 16:11
- Language: Marathi
- Label: Zee Music Company
External audio
- Audio Jukebox on YouTube

The songs for the film are composed by Avinash-Vishwajeet and lyrics by Avinash-Vishwajeet, Guru Thakur, Ashwini Shende, Madar Cholkar and Vishwajeet Joshi.

Track list
No.	Title	Lyrics	Singer(s)	Length
1.	"Nate He Konte"	Avinash-Vishwajeet	Hargun Kaur, Rohit Raut	4:13
2.	"Roj Wate"	Mandar Cholkar & Vishwajeet Joshi	Bela Shende	4:16
3.	"Kon Jane"	Guru Thakur	Bela Shende, Swapnil Bandodkar	3:58
4.	"Kay Tu"	Ashwini Shende	Sonu Nigam	3:44
Total length:				16:11
