= Lakshmi Sadaiv Mangalam =

2018 Indian Marathi-language TV series

- Genre: Family drama Soap opera
- Starring: See below
- Country of origin: India
- Original language: Marathi
- No. of episodes: 331

Production
- Producers: Rakesh Sarang; Sangita Sarang
- Camera setup: Multi-camera
- Running time: 22 minutes
- Production company: Camps Club Studios

Original release
- Network: Colors Marathi
- Release: 14 May 2018 – 25 May 2019

Related
- Lakshmi Baramma

Lakshmi Sadaiv Mangalam (transl. Lakshmi is always happy) is an Indian Marathi-language television series which aired on Colors Marathi. The show starred Surabhi Hande, Samruddhi Kelkar and Omprakash Shinde in lead roles. The series premiered from 14 May 2018 and ended on 25 May 2019. It is an official remake of Kannada TV series Lakshmi Baramma.

== Plot ==
Treated like a slave by her own family, Laxmi knows no happiness until Malhar enters her life like a knight in shining armour and proposes marriage. But a cruel twist of fate makes Laxmi realise that her marriage is nothing but a sham! Complicating things further, Laxmi will soon be caught in the middle of a love triangle which is sure to leave her questioning everything she knows.

== Cast ==
=== Main ===
- Omprakash Shinde as Malhar
- Samruddhi Kelkar as Laxmi

=== Recurring ===
- Surabhi Hande as Aarvi
- Hrishikesh Shelar as Ajinkya
- Ketaki Chitale as Aboli

== Adaptations ==
Language	Title	Original release	Network	Last aired	Notes
Kannada	Lakshmi Baramma ಲಕ್ಷ್ಮಿ ಬಾರಮ್ಮಾ	4 March 2013	Colors Kannada	25 January 2020	Original
Gujarati	Laxmi Sadaiv Mangalam લક્ષ્મી સદૈવ મંગલમ	29 January 2018	Colors Gujarati	17 April 2021	Remake
Tamil	Vandhal Sridevi வந்தாள் ஸ்ரீதேவி	11 April 2018	Colors Tamil	28 June 2019	Remake
Marathi	Lakshmi Sadaiv Mangalam लक्ष्मी सदैव मंगलम्	14 May 2018	Colors Marathi	25 May 2019	Remake
Hindi	Mishri मिश्री	3 July 2024	Colors TV	3 November 2024	Remake
