= Karbhari Laybhari =

2020 Indian Marathi language TV series

- Genre: Drama; Political thriller
- Story by: Tejpal Wagh
- Directed by: Mukesh Banekar
- Starring: See below
- Theme music composer: Pankaj Padghan
- Country of origin: India
- Original language: Marathi
- No. of episodes: 235

Production
- Producers: Tejpal Wagh; Saroj Wagh; Pravin Gaikwad
- Camera setup: Multi-camera
- Running time: 22 minutes
- Production company: Waghoba Production

Original release
- Network: Zee Marathi
- Release: 2 November 2020 – 21 August 2021

Karbhari Laybhari (transl. Steward is Good) is an Indian Marathi language TV series which aired on Zee Marathi. It premiered on 2 November 2020 and ended on 21 August 2021. It is produced by Tejpal Wagh under the banner of Waghoba Productions. It starred Nikhil Chavan and Anushka Sarkate in lead roles.

== Plot ==
A politician with staunch beliefs must face several obstacles that obstruct his path while trying to maintain his political and love life.

=== Special episode (1 hour) ===
- 13 December 2020
- 7 February 2021

== Cast ==
=== Main ===
- Nikhil Chavan as Rajveer Jaywant Suryavanshi (Veeru)
- Anushka Sarkate as Priyanka Ankushrao Patil / Priyanka Rajveer Suryavanshi (Piyu)

=== Recurring ===
Veeru's family

- Pooja Pawar as Kanchan Yashwant Suryavanshi - Veeru's aunt
- Shrikant KT as Yashwant Suryavanshi - Veeru's uncle
- Radhika Pisal as Sunanda Vasantrao Deshmukh / Sunanda Jaywant Suryavanshi - Veeru's mother
- Shriram Lokhande as Pruthvi Yashwant Suryavanshi - Veeru's brother
- Shrutkirti Sawant as Nisha Pruthvi Suryavanshi - Pruthvi's wife
- Trupti Shedge as Dipali (Deepa) - Suryavanshi's maid

Piyu's family

- Ajay Tapkire as Ankushrao Patil - Piyu's father
- Mahesh Jadhav as Jagdish Ankushrao Patil - Piyu's brother
- Somnath Vaishnav as Somnath Mane - Ankushrao's P.A.

Others

- Rashmi Patil as Sonali Patkure (Shona)
- Dhananjay Jamdar as Mr. Lavhale
- Krishna Jannu as Nagya - Veeru's friend
- Supriya Pawar as Vaishali - Piyu's friend
- Pranit Hate as Ganga - Shona's assistant
- Mayur More as Sanjay - Nisha's brother
- Shekhar Sawant as Mr. Bankar
- Ashok Gurav as Pilaji
- Shivanjali Porje as Mau
- Deepak Sathe
- Vinayak Jadhav
- Mahesh Ambekar
- Anil Jadhav
