= Victoria: Ek Rahasya =

2023 Marathi Horror-thriller film

- Theatrical release poster
- Directed by: Jeet Ashok and Virajas Kulkarni
- Written by: Omkar Gokhale
- Produced by: Anand Pandit; Roopa Pandit; Pushkar Jog
- Starring: Pushkar Jog; Sonalee Kulkarni; Akshay Kulkarni; Heera Sohal
- Cinematography: Sopan Purandare
- Edited by: Bhushan Sahasrabuddhe
- Music by: Nishaad Golambare
- Production companies: Anand Pandit Motion Pictures; Goosebumps Entertainment; Square Elephant Productions
- Release date: 13 January 2023
- Country: India
- Language: Marathi

Victoria: Ek Rahasya (transl. Victoria: A Mystery) is a 2023 Indian Marathi-language Horror-thriller film directed by Virajas Kulkarni and Jeet Ashok. Its producers are Anand Pandit, Roopa Pandit and Pushkar Jog. The film starring Pushkar Jog, Sonalee Kulkarni, Akshay Kulkarni. It was theatrically released on 13 January 2023.

== Cast ==
- Pushkar Jog as Adhiraj
- Sonalee Kulkarni as Ankita
- Aashay Kulkarni as Siddhartha
- Heera Sohal
- Mikaila Telford

== Release ==
The film was initially slated to hit the theaters on 16 December but due to the release of Avatar: The Way of Water on the same day, Victoria Ek Rahasya extended its release date and was released in theaters on 13 January 2023. It was digitally released on Amazon Prime Video in Marathi along with Hindi dubbed version.

== Music ==
Victoria Ek Rahasya

Single album by Nishaad Golambare and Sundaresh Sankrith
- Released: 6 December 2022
- Genre: Theme music
- Length: 2:54
- Label: Video Palace

Track listing
No.	Title	Length
1.	"Theme Music Track"	2:54
Total length:		2:54

== Reception ==
=== Critical reception ===
Anub George of The Times of India gave three out of five stars wrote "Victoria is still a good watch for weekend. Grab your friends and tuck in for night of mild horror." Siraj Syed of Filmfestivals.com gave two stars and wrote "Victoria leaves the first clause vague, goes halfway down the jump hallucination track and fails to explain some key happenings in the climax. No wonder a slick and polished film, shot in the wonderful locales of Scotland, leaves us unsatisfied." Sanjay Ghavre of Lokmat wrote "As two debutant directors have tried their best to give the audience a thrilling experience, this film should be watched once, ignoring the shortcomings."
