= Nikhil Chavan =

Indian film actor (born 1992)

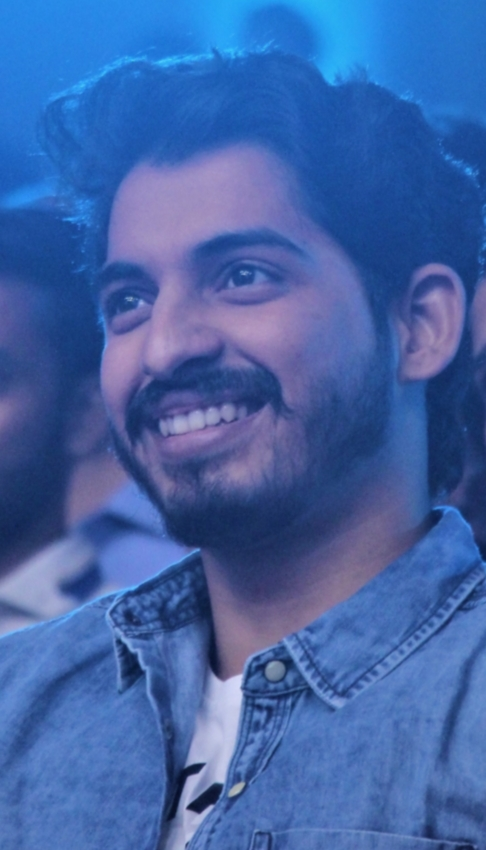
- Chavan in 2018
- Born: 29 May 1992 (age 34); Pune, Maharashtra, India
- Occupation: Actor
- Years active: 2011–present
- Notable work: Lagira Zala Ji; Karbhari Laybhari
- Spouse: Anushka Sarkate (m. 2026)

Nikhil Chavan (born 29 May 1992) is an Indian film actor known for his works in Marathi films and series. He is well known for his Marathi serial Karbhari Laybhari and Lagira Zala Ji for which he won the Zee Marathi Utsav Natyancha Awards 2017 for Best Supporting Actor. Chavan plays the lead in the ZEE5's original webseries Veergati and popular regional series Striling Pulling. He was ranked ninth in The Times of India's Top 20 Most Desirable Men of Maharashtra in 2020.

== Career ==
Nikhil started his career as a backstage artist in commercial theater. He was trying very hard to showcase his acting skills and finally he gained recognition with his supporting role in the Zee Marathi's coming-of-age drama series named Lagira Zala Ji, for which he won the Best Supporting Actor award for his performance in his debut series at Zee Marathi Utsav Natyancha Awards 2017.

In 2018, he acted in Atrocity and host Jallosh Ganrayacha the same year. Nikhil's first lead role was in Strilling Pulling in 2019, written and directed by Sameer Asha Patil, and which has won the Most Popular Regional Web Series Award powered by Brand Equity. He got starred as lead in a ZEE5's patriotic film Veergati. In 2020, he made his first lead role in Marathi series Karbhari Laybhari on Zee Marathi.

He is seen in Vishal Devrukhkar's Girlz in a guest appearance. His next film is Dhondi Champya - Ek Prem Katha starring Sayli Patil, directed by Dnyanesh Bhalekar.

== Filmography ==
=== Films ===
Years	Title	Role	Language	Notes	Ref(s)
2018	Atrocity	Villain	Marathi		
2019	Girlz	Aditya	Marathi	Guest Appearance	
2021	Darling	Rajabhau	Marathi	Main Role	
2022	Dhondi Champya - Ek Prem Katha	Aditya	Marathi		
2022	Tawaal	Aditya	Marathi		
2023	London Misal	Sameer	Marathi		
2024	Danka Hari Namacha	Vakil Singh	Marathi		
2025	Jantar Mantar ChuMantar		Marathi		
2025	Fir 469		Marathi		
2025	Abir		Marathi		
2025	Mhanje Waghache Panje		Marathi		
2025	Devghar On Rent		Marathi		
2026	Bhagubai		Marathi		

=== Web series ===
Years	Title	Role	Language	Platform	Ref(s)
2019	Veergati	Salim Shaikh	Marathi, Hindi	ZEE5	
2019	Striling Pulling	Sachin	Marathi	YouTube by ShudhDesi Marathi	

=== Serials ===
Years	Title	Role	Language	Channel	Ref(s)
2017-2018	Lagira Zala Ji	Vikram "Vikya" Raut	Marathi	Zee Marathi	
2018	Jallosh Ganrayacha	As Host	Marathi	Zee Marathi	
2020–2021	Karbhari Laybhari	Rajveer Suryavanshi	Marathi	Zee Marathi	

=== Plays ===
- Three Cheers
- Raygadala Jevha Jaag Yete
- Pati Sagle Uchapati
- Ithe Oshalala Mrutyu
- Tu Tu Me Me
- All the best

== Awards ==
Award	Category	Serial	Result	Ref(s)
Zee Marathi Utsav Natyancha Awards 2017	Best Supporting Actor	Lagira Zala Ji	Won	
