= Tamasha Live =

2022 Indian Marathi-language drama film

- Original title: तमाशा लाईव्ह
- Directed by: Sanjay Jadhav
- Written by: Sanjay Jadhav; Manish Kadam; Kiran Yadnyopavit
- Produced by: Akshay Vilas Bardapurkar
- Starring: Sonalee Kulkarni; Siddhartha Jadhav
- Cinematography: Sanjay Jadhav; Jay Prakash Gupta
- Edited by: Apurva Motiwale Sahai; Ashish Mhatre
- Music by: Pankajj Padghan; Amitraj
- Production companies: 88 Pictures; 18th May Film Company; Maooli Production Pvt Ltd
- Distributed by: Planet Marathi
- Release date: 15 July 2022
- Country: India
- Language: Marathi

Tamasha Live is an Indian Marathi-language drama film written and directed by Sanjay Jadhav. It stars Sonalee Kulkarni and Siddhartha Jadhav and was released theatrically on 15 July 2022.

== Cast ==
- Sonalee Kulkarni
- Siddhartha Jadhav
- Nagesh Bhonsle
- Pushkar Jog
- Sachit Patil
- Bharat Jadhav
- Hemangi kavi

== Production ==
The film was announced in mid-August 2021, starring Sonalee Kulkarni.

The principal photography of the film started in mid-September 2021. Actor Pushkar Jog announced the wrap of the film schedule on 8 February 2022.

== Soundtrack ==
The film's music composed by Pankaj Padghan.

Tamasha Live

Soundtrack album by Pankajj Padghan
- Released: 2022
- Recorded: 2021
- Genre: film soundtrack
- Length: 42:44
- Label: Planet Marathi

Track list
No.	Title	Singer(s)	Length
1.	"Chitrapatchi Nandi"	Shounak Abhisheki, Anand Bhate, Rahul Deshpande, Anuradha Kuber	5:53
2.	"Rang Lagala"	Amitraj, Aanandi Joshi	4:29
3.	"Batamichi Vari"	Prasenjit Kosambi, Pankajj Padghan, Kartiki Gaikwad	5:46
4.	"Garma Garam"	Amitraj, Vaishali Samant	3:22
5.	"Wagh Aala Wagh"	Amitraj, Adarsh Shinde	3:23
6.	"Zunj Lagali"	Pankajj Padghan, Saurabh Salunkhe	3:38
7.	"Phad Lagalay"	Vaishali Samant, Amitraj, Sajan Bendre	3:43
8.	"Zakham Jahari"	Amitraj, Harshwardhan Wavare, Aanandi Joshi	3:18
9.	"Kadaklakshmi"	Pankajj Padghan, Sonalee Kulkarni	1:25
10.	"Jau Kuthe Maghari"	Sayalie Pankaj, Pankajj Padghan	3:06
11.	"Melyahun Melyagat"	Pankajj Padghan, Siddharth Jadhav	1:51
12.	"Gammat Gadya"	Pankajj Padghan, Rohit Raut, Shilpa Pai	2:38
13.	"Lath Ghanaar"	Pankajj Padghan, Sachit Patil	2:56
14.	"Vasudev Aala"	Pankajj Padghan, Saurabh Salunke, Sayalie Pankaj	3:02
Total length:			42:44

== Marketing and release ==
Official teaser of the film launched on 2 May 2022, on Instagram, and the trailer of the film launched 4 July 2022.

Tamasha Live was scheduled to release theatrically on 24 June 2022 but was pushed to release on 15 July 2022.

== Reception ==
=== Critical response ===
Mihir Bhanage of The Times of India scored the film at 2.5 out of 5 stars and says "Tamasha Live aims to merge news and theatrics to present a current scenario. The film has some clever lines that hit the mark, but it doesn't make the impact that it wants to, ending up being a story with good potential and average execution" Pune Mirror wrote "Overall, the concept and experimentation of the film are exceptional and a positive change of pace, but the direction is so shoddy and lifeless that it ruins the overall experience. Having said that, it is good to see that there is room for experiment within Marathi cinema and one cannot help but laud this risk taken by the cast and crew of Tamasha Live." Suyog Zore of Cinestaan.com scored the film at 2 out of 5 stars and wrote "Overall, the lack of imagination in designing a unique and engaging musical drama ultimately leaves the viewer disappointed"
