= Sakaal Times =

English-language Indian newspaper

Sakal Times was an English-language daily newspaper published from Pune, India. It has recently been renamed as Sakàl Times. It is published by the Sakal Media Group, a media establishment in Pune whose flagship publication is the daily broadsheet Sakal (in Marathi). The paper started circulating in May 2008. The content is generated by staff reporters, writers and photographers. Also, some of the content is sourced from news agencies. Madhav Gokhale was the last editor of Sakal Times and it shut down its print edition in June 2020.
