= Bakula Namdeo Ghotale =

- Theatrical release poster
- Directed by: Kedar Shinde
- Story by: Kedar Shinde
- Produced by: Atul Maroo; Ketan Maroo
- Starring: Bharat Jadhav; Siddharth Jadhav; Sonalee Kulkarni; Vijay Chavan; Kushal Badrike
- Cinematography: Anil Khandekar
- Music by: Devdatta Sable
- Production company: Shemaroo Entertainment
- Release date: 12 October 2007
- Country: India
- Language: Marathi

Bakula Namdeo Ghotale is a 2007 Indian Marathi-language comedy drama film directed by Kedar Shinde, and the debut film of Actress Sonalee Kulkarni. The film stars Bharat Jadhav, Siddharth Jadhav, Sonalee Kulkarni, Vijay Chavan, and Kushal Badrike.

== Synopsis ==
Bhakaspur is the name of a remote town in Maharashtra. Troubled under obligations from their questionable sarpanch "Ghotale", the villagers have no time for something besides trudging and reimbursing their obligations. The tutoring of their youngsters or the advancement of their town is of no worry to them. The whole town is controlled by Ghotale, and every one of the villagers concur and tolerate each guideline given by him as every one of their properties and homes are pawned to Ghotale. The highlight of Ghotale's character is that, as much as his activities appear to be clever, his insidious streak has no limits.

In a similar town, there is a nitwit named "Namdev", who returns to his town in the wake of getting hitched to "Bakula". According to the customs, he goes straight to Ghotale's home with his better half to look for his gifts. Be that as it may, one takes a gander at his significant other and Ghotale is left confused. He is completely amazed by Bakula and falls head over heels in love with her. Without even a second's pause, he chooses in his brain to get hitched to her, by snare or by hooligan. In spite of Namdev being a vital piece of Bakula's life, Ghotale tries to charm her in his own specific manner. Namdev, thus, tries to keep her out of Ghotale's path and in this disarray, all Bakula needs is to lead a glad wedded existence with her better half.

Ghotale's charm, Namdev's straightforwardness and Bakula's one good turn deserve another demeanor with Ghotale provides much comedy.

== Cast ==
- Bharat Jadhav as Ghotale
- Siddharth Jadhav as Namdeo
- Sonalee Kulkarni as Bakula
- Vijay Chavan
- Kushal Badrike
- Ganesh Revdekar
- Ghanashyam Ghorpade
- Prashant Gore
- Rajan Deshmukh
- Varsha Kambli
- Uma Rane
- Gitanjali Kambli
- Archana Gaekwad
- Bhakti Jadhav
- Bimega Khamkar
- Jayraj Nair
- Sandip Sarode
- Manoj Takne
- Machchindra More
- Resham Tipnis

== Soundtrack ==
The music was composed by Devdatta Sable and lyrics were written by Macchindra More.

Song	Artist(s)	Duration
"Aivaj Havali Kela"	Vaishali Samant, Tyagraj Khadilkar	03:33
"Mi Sataryachi Gulchadi"	Vaishali Samant, Devdatta Sable	06:09
"Mann Zurtaya"	Vaishali Samant, Devdatta Sable, Rohan Pradhan	04:18
"Kalla Kalla"	Devdatta Sable	01:10
