= Irada Pakka =

- Theatrical release poster
- Directed by: Kedar Shinde
- Written by: Nimish Datt; Omkar Datt
- Produced by: Smita Meghe
- Starring: Siddharth Jadhav; Sonalee Kulkarni; Mohan Joshi
- Cinematography: Rahul Jadhav; Raja Satankar
- Edited by: Paresh Manjrekar
- Music by: Nilesh Moharir; Pankaj; Pushkar Mahabal
- Production company: Meghe Entertainment
- Release date: 23 April 2010
- Country: India
- Language: Marathi

Irada Pakka is a Marathi film released on 23 April 2010, produced by Smita Meghe under the banner of Meghe Entertainment and directed by Kedar Shinde. Siddharth Jadhav and Sonalee Kulkarni are in lead roles.

== Plot ==
Rohit, a recently married individual managing a software company, enjoys a content life with his wife Aadya, who works as a school teacher. However, seeking to inject some excitement into their seemingly smooth lives, they decide to embark on a game where they engage in playful fights for a week. Unfortunately, what begins as an attempt to add a dash of spice to their routine takes an unexpected turn. The game of constant bickering ends up putting a strain on their relationship, leading to a series of conflicts.

The situation deteriorates to the extent that Rohit and Aadya find themselves contemplating divorce after the week-long experiment. What initially seemed like a lighthearted endeavor to break the monotony turns into a serious test for their relationship. The unintended consequences of their game create a challenging and tumultuous period for the couple, prompting them to consider drastic measures for their future.

== Cast ==
The cast includes

- Siddharth Jadhav as Rohit
- Sonalee Kulkarni as Adhya
- Mohan Joshi as Adhya's father
- Smita Jaykar as Adhya's mother
- Shalaka Pawar as Savitri
- Sneha Raikar as Shalu vahini
- Jaywant Wadkar as Shalu's husband
- Meenal Bal as Sameera
- Kamlakar Satpute as Satyawan
- Atul Todankar as Deepak
- Nirmala Kotnis as Naina
- Vijay Chavan as school principal
- Gauri Konge as Nisha

== Soundtrack ==
The music is provided by Nilesh Mohrir, Pankaj and Pushkar Mahabal. It was launched at Ravindra Natya Mandir Dadar on 29 January 2010.

The album contains six original and three remixed songs. Nilesh Moharir composed the majority of the album and Pankaj & Pushkar joined for title track.

Song	Singer(s)	Duration	Lyrics	Composer
"Aata Maage Na Jane"	Avadhoot Gupte, Vaishali Made	4:47	Sumthi Vangede	Nilesh Moharir
"Bhijun Gela Wara"	Kshitij Tarey, Nihira Joshi	4:41	Ashwini Shende	Nilesh Moharir
"Banda Padaliye Aapli Gaadi"	Avadhoot Gupte, Kshitij Tarey, Nilesh Moharir, Poulami Pete, Pushkar Mahabal	4:41	Ashwini Shende	Nilesh Moharir
"Kadhi Kadhi"	Javed Ali	4:34	Ashwini Shende	Nilesh Moharir
"Kadhi Kadhi" (Lounge Mix)	Javed Ali	4:38	Ashwini Shende	Nilesh Moharir
"Banda Padaliye Aapli Gaadi" (remix)	Avadhoot Gupte	4:41	Ashwini Shende	Nilesh Moharir
"Ek Kolha Bahu Bhukela"	Jaanvee Prabhu Arora	1:38	Nimish Dath	Pankaj - Pushkar
"Irada Pakka"	Hindol Pendse, Pushkar Mahabal	1:38	Nimish Dath	Pankaj - Pushkar
"Irada Pakka" (Hindi)	Hindol Pendse, Pushkar Mahabal	2:31	Tanveer Ghazi	Pankaj - Pushkar
