= Paradh =

2010 Indian film by Gajendra Ahire

- Theatrical release poster
- Directed by: Gajendra Ahire
- Produced by: Anradha S. Talati
- Starring: Makarand Anaspure; Siddharth Jadhav; Ravi Kale; Vrinda Gajendra; Milind Shinde
- Music by: Rahul Ranade
- Release date: 17 August 2010
- Country: India
- Language: Marathi

Paradh is a Marathi movie released on 17 August 2010.The movie was produced by Anuradha S. Talati and directed by Gajendra Ahire.

== Cast ==
The cast includes

- Makarand Anaspure as Ambadas
- Siddharth Jadhav as Yeshwant
- Ravi Kale as Vithal
- Vrinda Gajendra as (sister in law) & others.
- Vinay Apte as Prataprao

== Soundtrack ==
The music is provided by Rahul Ranade.
