= Kshanbhar Vishranti =

2010 Marathi film

- Theatrical release poster
- Directed by: Sachit Patil
- Written by: Sachit Patil
- Story by: Sachit Patil
- Produced by: Sandeep S. Shinde; Maulik Bhatt
- Starring: Bharat Jadhav; Sachit Patil; Sonalee Kulkarni; Siddarth Jadhav; Manwa Naik; Hemant Dhome; Kadambari Kadam; Maulik Bhatt; Pooja Sawant; Shubhangi Gokhale
- Music by: Rishikesh Kamerkar
- Release date: 9 April 2010
- Country: India
- Language: Marathi

Kshanbhar Vishraanti is a Marathi film which was released on 9 April 2010. The movie has been produced by Sandeep S. Shinde along with Maulik Bhatt, and directed by Sachit Patil.

== Cast ==
- Bharat Jadhav as Appa; Neha's uncle, Jiji's brother
- Sachit Patil as Ritvik
- Sonalee Kulkarni as Sanika
- Siddharth Jadhav as Vishnu Pant Jagdale
- Manava Naik as Neha
- Hemant Dhome as Abhijeet
- Kadambari Kadam as Manasi
- Maulik Bhatt as Rahul
- Pooja Sawant as Nishita
- Shubhangi Gokhale as Jiji
- Jayraj Nair as Mhatre; broker

== Soundtracks ==
The music was composed by Hrishikesh Kamerkar. Lyrics were written by Guru Thakur.

Song	Artist(s)	Duration
"Holiday Holiday"	Hrishikesh Kamerkar	05:38
"Tu Sanso Me Hai Tu"	Hrishikesh Kamerkar, Shilpa Pai	05:13
"Bavra"	Hrishikesh Kamerkar, Shilpa Pai, Avadhoot Gupte, Janhavi Prabhu-Arora	04:39
"Sargam"	Shilpa Pai	04:52
"Kshanbhar Vishranti"	Hrishikesh Kamerkar, Shilpa Pai	03:58
"Holiday Holiday" (Remix)	Hrishikesh Kamerkar	04:05
"Tu Sanso Me Hai Tu" (Remix)	Hrishikesh Kamerkar, Shilpa Pai	04:01
