= Saade Maade Teen =

2007 Indian Marathi-language film

- Theatrical release poster
- Directed by: Ankush Chaudhari; Sachit Patil
- Written by: Sanjay Mone
- Based on: Chalti Ka Naam Gaadi by Satyen Bose
- Starring: Bharat Jadhav; Makarand Anaspure; Amruta Khanvilkar; Ashok Saraf
- Cinematography: Sanjay Jadhav
- Music by: Ajit Parab; Rishikesh Kamerkar; Ajay–Atul
- Production company: Anubhuti Art
- Distributed by: Zee Talkies
- Release date: 23 November 2007
- Running time: 125 min
- Country: India
- Language: Marathi
- Box office: ₹4.50 crore

Saade Maade Teen (transl. Last and Final Three) is a 2007 Indian Marathi language comedy film directed by Ankush Chaudhari and Sachit Patil, in their directorial debut, and written by Sanjay Mone. The film is remake of Hindi film Chalti Ka Naam Gaadi. It stars Ashok Saraf, Bharat Jadhav, Makarand Anaspure, Amruta Khanvilkar and Siddharth Jadhav. The film's music was composed by Ajay-Atul. It is one of the breakthrough movie for actor Bharat Jadhav. The film was one of the highest grossing Marathi films of that time.

== Plot ==
The story is of 3 brothers- the family head Ratan Dada and his 2 brothers Madan and Chandan, running their Kurale garage. The younger duo never dares to go against dada's wish. Dada is a character who hates female because of his first love. A girl betrayed him after a marriage proposal.

== Cast ==
- Ashok Saraf as Ratan, the oldest of the three brothers.
- Makarand Anaspure as Madan, the middle brother.
- Bharat Jadhav as Chandan, the youngest of the three brothers.
- Amruta Khanvilkar as Madhura; Chandan's love interest
- Siddharth Jadhav as Baban
- Sujata Joshi as Sharvari; Madan's love interest
- Arun Nalawade as Rao Sahab
- Sukanya Kulkarni as Ratan's girlfriend who suspiciously goes missing, leading Ratan to believe she abandoned him.
- Uday Tikekar as Viredra Saheb
- Sumeet Raghavan as himself (cameo appearance)

== Soundtrack ==
No.	Title	Lyrics	Music	Singer(s)	Length
1.	"777 Rupaye"	Shrirang Godbole	Ajit Parab, Rishikesh Kamerkar	Vaishali Samant, Avadhoot Gupte, Rishikesh Kamerkar	6:46
2.	"Andharachi Raat"	Shrirang Godbole	Ajit Parab, Rishikesh Kamerkar	Rishikesh Kamerkar	4:03
3.	"Saade Maade Teen"	Shrirang Godbole	Ajay–Atul	Kunal Ganjawala	3:36
Total length:					14:25
