= Bharat Jadhav =

Indian actor (Born December 1973)

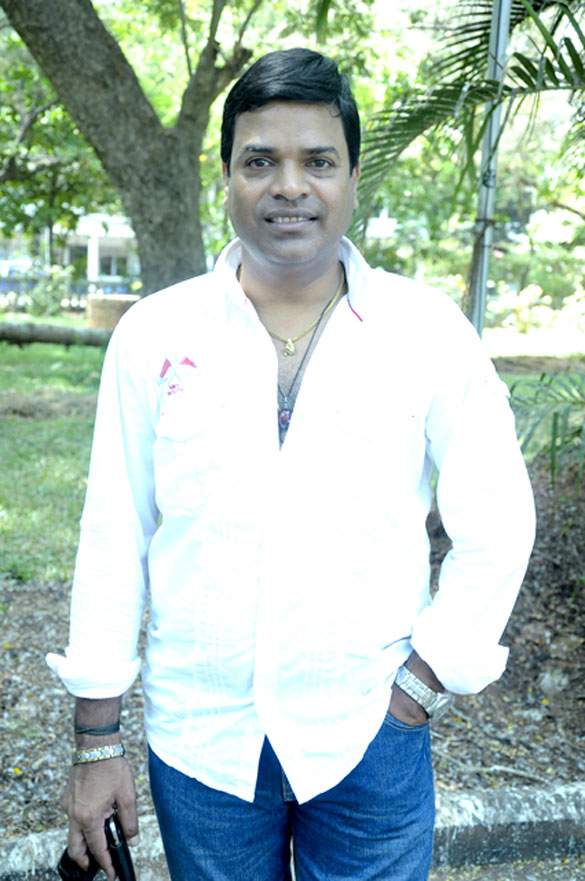
- Born: 12 December 1973 (age 52); Mumbai, Maharashtra
- Occupations: Actor; film and television producer
- Years active: 1985–present
- Spouse: Sarita Jadhav (m. 1998)
- Children: 2
- Honours: V. Shantaram Special Contribution Award

Bharat Jadhav (pronounced [bʱəɾət̪ d͡ʒaːɖʱəʋ]; (born 12 December 1973) is an Indian actor and producer who primarily works in Marathi cinema, theatre, and television. Having appeared in more than 85 films, Bharat is among the highest paid Marathi actors. His accolades include a Maharashtra State Film Award, a Zee Chitra Gaurav Puraskar. He was honoured with V. Shantaram Special Contribution Award in 2019 by the Government of Maharashtra. He is best known for his play Sahi Re Sahi which completed 4444 shows during its run.

Jadhav began his career in the 1980s through cultural programmes, folk performances and stage activities in Mumbai. He was associated with Shahir Sable’s folk troupe Maharashtrachi Lokdhara, where he performed in traditional dance and musical shows across Maharashtra.

He rose to fame through successful Marathi plays such as All The Best and Sahi Re Sahi, which established him as one of the leading actors in Marathi theatre. In the 2000s, he became one of the biggest stars of Marathi cinema with commercially successful films including Pachhadlela, Aga Bai Arrecha!, Jatra: Hyalagaad Re Tyalagaad, Khabardar and Saade Maade Teen. His comic performances and collaborations with director Kedar Shinde and actors Ankush Chaudhari and Sanjay Narvekar played an important role in the revival of Marathi commercial cinema during the decade.

From 2013 onward, Jadhav expanded into production and television while continuing to work in films and theatre. Although several of his later films received mixed commercial responses, he remained an active and respected figure in the industry. In 2024, he appeared in the Hindi film Srikanth alongside Rajkummar Rao, while 2025 marked a successful phase in his later career with films such as Dashavatar, Ata Thambaycha Naay! and Banjara. In 2026, he reprised his popular character Chandan in Punha Ekda Sade Made Teen.

== Early life ==
Bharat Jadhav was born on 12 December 1973 in Mumbai, Maharashtra, India. He was raised in the Lalbaug–Parel area of Mumbai and grew up in the city’s chawl culture. From an early age, he developed an interest in acting, dancing and stage performances, often participating in local cultural programmes and Ganesh festival events.

Jadhav came from a middle-class family with a modest background. His father worked as a driver, and the family lived a simple life in Mumbai. Despite financial limitations, his parents encouraged his participation in cultural and performing arts activities. His upbringing in Mumbai’s working-class neighbourhoods influenced his comic timing and stage presence, which later became significant aspects of his acting career.

== Career ==
=== Debut and early struggles (1985-1992) ===
Jadhav began his career in the mid-1980s through cultural programmes, folk performances and local stage activities in Mumbai. During his early years, he was associated with Shahir Sable’s folk troupe Maharashtrachi Lokdhara, where he participated in traditional dance performances, musical stage shows and touring cultural events across Maharashtra. Performing before live audiences at a young age helped him develop confidence, comic timing and improvisational skills. His exposure to Mumbai’s Ganesh festival cultural competitions and chawl-based stage programmes also played an important role in shaping his interest in acting and comedy.

During the late 1980s and early 1990s, Jadhav struggled to establish himself in Marathi commercial theatre. He initially performed small comic and supporting roles in stage productions while balancing financial difficulties. At the time, Marathi theatre was dominated by established actors, and newcomers found it difficult to gain recognition. However, his energetic stage presence and natural comic style gradually helped him gain attention within theatre circles. Throughout the 1990s, he became active in commercial Marathi plays and developed professional associations with actors such as Ankush Chaudhari, Sanjay Narvekar and Kedar Shinde, who later became frequent collaborators in films and theatre.

=== Theatre recognition (1993-2003) ===
Jadhav gained wider recognition through successful Marathi stage plays, particularly the comedy play All The Best. The play became one of the biggest commercial successes in modern Marathi theatre and significantly increased his popularity among audiences across Maharashtra. His comic performances, expressive body language and ability to connect with live audiences made him one of the leading theatre actors of his generation. Around the same period, he also appeared in several television programmes and Marathi serials, including Prapanch.

In 1999, Jadhav made an appearance in the Hindi film Vaastav: The Reality, directed by Mahesh Manjrekar. Although his role was small, it marked his entry into cinema. During the early 2000s, he became part of the commercially successful wave of Marathi comedy films that helped revive the Marathi film industry after a difficult phase in the 1990s. He frequently collaborated with director Kedar Shinde and actors Ankush Chaudhari and Sanjay Narvekar in comedy-oriented films that appealed to both urban and rural audiences.

=== Established actor (2004-2012) ===
Jadhav achieved major popularity with films such as Pachhadlela (2004), Aga Bai Arrecha! (2004), Jatra: Hyalagaad Re Tyalagaad (2005), Khabardar (2005), Majha Navra Tujhi Bayko (2006) and Saade Maade Teen (2007). These films established him as one of the leading comedy actors in Marathi cinema. His performance in Jatra became especially popular among audiences, and the song “Kombadi Palali” emerged as a cultural phenomenon in Maharashtra. The success of these films contributed to the revival of commercially successful Marathi cinema during the 2000s.

Apart from films, Jadhav continued to dominate Marathi theatre. One of the most successful plays of his career was Sahi Re Sahi, in which he played multiple characters. The play became one of the longest-running and highest-grossing Marathi stage productions and toured extensively across Maharashtra and abroad for Marathi-speaking audiences. He later acted in several other successful plays including Shrimant Damodar Pant and continued to remain one of the biggest crowd-pulling stars in Marathi commercial theatre.

During the late 2000s and early 2010s, Jadhav continued appearing in Marathi films while balancing television and theatre commitments. He acted in films such as Bakula Namdeo Ghotale, Saali Ne Kela Ghotala, Hello! Gandhe Sir, Shikshanachya Aaicha Gho and Fakta Ladh Mhana.

=== Further success and business ventures (2013–present) ===
In 2013, he launched Bharat Jadhav Entertainment Pvt. Ltd., marking his expansion into production and entertainment-related ventures. The launch event was attended by several notable personalities from Marathi cinema and theatre. Around this period, he also focused on live stage tours, comedy events and television appearances. He later hosted entertainment programmes such as Aali Lahar Kela Kahar on Colors Marathi.

In 2013, Jadhav starred in Sat Na Gat, where he played the role of a journalist. The same year, he reunited with director Kedar Shinde for the film Kho-Kho. In 2014, he appeared in Shasan, a political drama that showcased a different side of his acting abilities. He once again collaborated with Kedar Shinde in Aga Bai Arechyaa 2, the sequel to the popular Marathi fantasy-comedy film. Between 2016 and 2022, Jadhav worked in several films including Ek Kutub Teen Minar, Unch Bharari, Appa Ani Bappa, Stepney, Dhondi Champya - Ek Prem Katha, and Tamasha Live. Although these films helped him remain active in the Marathi film industry, most of them failed to achieve major commercial success at the box office. In 2023, he appeared in London Misal, which also did not perform well commercially.

In 2024, Jadhav played the role of a magistrate in the Hindi biographical drama Srikanth starring Rajkummar Rao. The year 2025 proved to be one of the most important phases of his later career. He received appreciation for his performance in Dashavatar, which became both a commercial and critical success. His role was especially praised by audiences and critics alike. The same year, Ata Thambaycha Naay! earned critical acclaim, while Banjara also performed well. In 2026, Jadhav returned to one of his most loved comic characters, Chandan, in Punha Ekda Sade Made Teen, bringing nostalgia to fans of the original film.

== Personal life ==
Jadhav married Sarita in 1998 in an arranged marriage organised by their families. Following their marriage, the couple had two children — a daughter and a son. Unlike their father, both of his children have largely stayed away from the public spotlight and prefer to maintain a private life away from the entertainment industry.

== Filmography ==
=== Feature films ===
Key
†	Denotes films that have not yet been released

Year	Film	Role	Ref(s)
1999	Vaastav :The Reality	Raghu's friend	
2000	Khatarnak	Rangya	
2003	Pran Jaaye Par Shaan Na Jaaye	Mahendra Rathod	
2003	Baap Ka Baap	Mandar	
2004	House Full	Mandar	
2004	Nawryachi Kamaal Baaykochi Dhamaal	Sunita's son	
2004	Chatur Navra Chikni Baiko	Mahesh/Raja	
2004	Aga Bai Arrecha!	Special Appearance in song "Cham Cham Karta"	
2004	Pachadlela	Bharat	
2005	Jatra: Hyalagaad Re Tyalagaad	Mohnya/Ghumya	
2005	Don Fool Ek Doubtful	Mohan	
2005	Sarivar Sari	Sandip	
2005	Khabardar	Press reporter Bharat Bhalerao	
2006	Nana Mama	Driver Nana	
2006	Maza Navara Tuzi Bayako	Vitthal Parab	
2006	Namdaar Mukhyamantri Ganpya Gawde	Ganpat (Ganpya) Gawde	
2006	Chalu Navara Bholi Bayako	Prem	
2006	Golmaal	Dhairyashil Chiplunkar	
2006	Ishhya	Doctor	
2007	Mumbaicha Dabewala	Namdeo Dabewala	
2007	Mukkam post London	Bharat Fakdu Kamble	
2007	Bharat Aala Parat	Bharat	
2007	Saade Maade Teen	Chandan	
2007	Zabardast	Appa Dambis	
2007	Hyancha Kahi Nem Nahi	Hire	
2007	Bakula Namdeo Ghotale	Sarpanch Ghotale	
2008	Galgale Nighale	Galgale	
2008	Gondya Martay Tangda	Gondya	
2008	Uladhaal	Babu	
2009	Me Shivajiraje Bhosale Boltoy	Shahir	
2009	Lagnachi Varat Londonchya Gharat	Ganu	
2010	Aata Pita	Ashutosh Pawar	
2010	Kshanbhar Vishranti	Caretaker Appa	
2010	Tata Birla ani Laila	Birla	
2010	Ringa Ringa	Siddharth	
2010	Houn Jau de	Nandhava Patil	
2010	Shikshanachya Aaicha Gho	Madhukar Rane	
2010	Hello! Gandhe Sir	Gangya	
2010	Javai Bapu Zindabad	Hrishikesh Desai	
2010	Zhak Marli Bayko Keli	Kuldeep	
2010	Ladi Godi	Rajesh	
2011	Mast Challay Amcha	Bhat Saheb	
2011	Jhing Chik Jhing	Mauli	Maharashtra State Film Award for Best Actor
2011	Fakt Ladh Mhana	Tukaram	
2011	Davpech	Venkat Fulpagare	
2011	Kalshekhar Aahet Ka?	Pitambar Lele	
2012	No Entry Pudhe Dhoka Aahey	Kishan	
2012	Amhi Chamakate Tare	Sameer's friend	
2012	Dhava Dhav	Veeru	
2012	Shrimant Damodar Pant	Shrimant Damodar and Damu	
2012	Mazhya Navryachi Bayko	Harishchandra Khare	
2012	Yedyanchi Jatra	Haarya	
2013	Sat Na Gat	Journalist Uttam Vable	
2013	Kho Kho	Shrirang Desai	
2013	Bhootacha Honeymoon	Shankar	
2013	Beed Cha Raaja	Bharat	
2014	Chintamani	Chintamani	
2014	Pune Via Bihar	Nishikant Nimbalkar	
2015	Shasan	Jairaj Patil	
2015	Aga Bai Arechyaa 2	Narendra Keshav Chakve	
2016	Ek Kutub Teen Minar	Kutub	
2018	Unch Bharari	Deva	
2019	Appa Ani Bappa	Govind Kulkarni	
2019	Stepney	Anand	
2022	Dhondi Champya - Ek Prem Katha	Umaji	
2022	Tamasha Live	Chief Minister	
2023	London Misal	Jagannathrao	
2024	Srikanth	Magistrate	Hindi film
2025	Ata Thambaycha Naay!	Sakharam Manchekar	
2025	Banjara	Sameer	
2025	Dashavatar	Laxman Wadekar	
2026	Punha Ekda Sade Made Teen	Chandan	

=== Television ===
Year	Title	Role	Notes
1999-2002	Prapanch	Bharat	Debut
2000	Hasa Chakat Fu	Bharat	
2003	Saheb Bibi Aani Mi	Mohan Ajgaonkar	Zee Marathi Award for Best Comedy Character
2004-2005	Misha	Jr. Alien	
2016	Aali Lahar Kela Kahar	Host	
2020	Sukhi Mansacha Sadra	Chimanrao	

=== Web series ===
- Scam 2003 – Durgesh Bharade
- Matka King – Sub Inspector Eknath Tumbade
- Kon Yashwant Pansare? – Yashwant Pansare

=== Drama ===
- Maharashtrachi Lokdhara
- Aamchya Sarkhe Aamhich
- All The Best
- Sahi Re Sahi
- Shrimant Damodar Pant
- Adhantar
- Saujanyachi Aishi Taishi
- Punha Sahi Re Sahi
- Tu Tu Me Me
- Astitva

== Accolades ==
Year	Awards	Categories	Work	Result
2009	Maharashtra State Film Awards	Best Actor	Jhing Chik Jhing	Won
2009	Zee Chitra Gaurav Puraskar	Best Actor	Jhing Chik Jhing	Nominated
2009	Maharashtra Times Sanman	Best Actor in a Leading Role	Jhing Chik Jhing	Won
2017	Dada Kondke Awards	Dada Kondke Smruti Puraskar	Overall Contribution	Honoured
2018	Maharashtra State Film Awards	V. Shantaram Special Contribution Award	Overall Contribution	Honoured
2018	Zee Natya Gaurav Puraskar	Best Actor	Welcome Zindagi	Won
2018	Sanskruti Kaladarpan	Best Actor	Welcome Zindagi	Won
