= Sachit Patil =

Indian actor, director, writer and theatre director

- Born: Sachit Patil; 27 September 1974 (age 51); Mumbai, Maharashtra, India
- Occupations: Actor, director, writer, play director
- Years active: 2002–present
- Spouse: Shilpa Pai (m. 2009)

Sachit Patil is an Indian actor, director, writer and theatre director. He is known for his work in Marathi cinema. He made his debut in the Bollywood film Kyon? (2003). He made his Marathi film debut with Avdhoot Gupte's Zenda (2010), which was a success at the box office. He made his directorial debut with the superhit Saade Maade Teen.

== Career ==
Sachit began his film career with the 2003 Suspense thriller, Kyon?. He then appeared in Sab Kuch Hai Kuch Bhi Nai (2005) and Raasta Roko (2006).

He made his directorial debut in 2007 with the superhit Saade Maade Teen. He then made his Marathi film debut in 2010 with Avdhoot Gupte's Zenda (2010), which was a superhit at the box office. He then directed and also appeared in Kshanbhar Vishranti, opposite Sonalee Kulkarni, which became a superhit at the box office. He then appeared in the action thriller film Arjun, which also became a superhit at the box office. He was Nominated for MFK Award for Favourite Actor for his Performance in Arjun.

In 2015, he appeared in gray character in the blockbuster film Classmates, directed by Aditya Sarpotdar. In 2017, he got the role in Asa Mee Tashi Ti opposite to Pallavi Subhash. He was appearing on Colors Marathi TV show Radha Prem Rangi Rangli.

== Personal life ==
Sachit Patil Completed his education from D. G. Ruparel College of Arts, Science and Commerce in Mumbai. Sachit married his college friend Shilpa Pai. He belongs to the Somvanshi Kshatriya Pathare Panchkalshi, an ethnic upper caste community of Hindu society in Maharashtra, India.

== Filmography ==
=== Films ===
Year	Title	Language	Actor	Director	Role	Notes
2003	Kyon?	Hindi	Yes		Amar Mathur	
2005	Sab Kuch Hai Kuch Bhi Nahi	Hindi	Yes			
2006	Raasta Roko	Marathi	Yes			
2007	Saade Maade Teen	Marathi		Yes		Directorial Debut; Remake of Chalti Ka Naam Gaadi
2010	Zenda	Marathi	Yes		Aditya Pradhan	
2010	Kshanbhar Vishranti	Marathi	Yes	Yes	Hritvik	
2010	Samudra	Marathi	Yes		Bhargav Ram	
2011	Arjun	Marathi	Yes		Arjun Pawar	Nominated MFK Award for Favourite Actor
2012	Satya, Savitri ani Satyawan	Marathi	Yes		Inspector Gavaskar	
2013	Asa Mee Ashi Tee	Marathi	Yes		Siddharth Kamat	
2015	Classmates	Marathi	Yes		Rohit	remake of the 2006 Malayalam film of the same name
2016	Friends	Marathi	Yes		Karan	Remake of Bengali film Sangee (2003)
2016	Paisa Paisa	Marathi	Yes		Ajay	
2016	One Way Ticket	Marathi	Yes		Samar Raj	
2022	Tamasha Live	Marathi	Yes			
2025	Asambhav	Marathi	Yes	Yes	Aditya Deshmukh / Madhav	
2026	Ravan Calling †	Marathi	Yes	No		

== Television ==
Year	Serial	Role	Channel	Notes
2004	Aakrosh	Shishir Ahuja	DD National	Supporting Role
2017–2019	Radha Prem Rangi Rangli	Prem Deshmukh	Colors Marathi	Lead Role
2021	Tu Chandane Shimpit Jashi	Satyajeet	Sony Marathi	Lead Role
2021–2025	Aboli	Inspector Ankush Shinde	Star Pravah	Lead Role
