= Siddharth Jadhav =

Indian actor, entertainer, and comedian (born 1981)

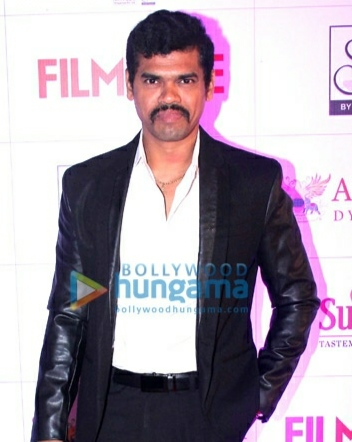
- Jadhav in 2017
- Born: Siddharth Ramchandra Jadhav; 23 October 1981 (age 44); Ratnagiri, Maharashtra, India
- Education: Sewri Municipal School
- Occupations: Actor; comedian; entertainer
- Years active: 2000–present
- Spouse: Trupti Akkalwar (m. 2007)
- Children: 2
- Awards: Yuva Balgandharva Puraskaar (2007)

Siddharth Jadhav (born 23 October 1981) is an Indian actor, entertainer and comedian widely known for his work in several Hindi and Marathi films and stage productions. He has received several awards including three Maharashtra State Film Awards, four Maharashtracha Favourite Kon Awards, and two Filmfare Awards Marathi.

He is from Sewri, Maharashtra. He has acted in television, Marathi and Hindi films. He has acted in several Bollywood movies like Golmaal and Golmaal Returns but he asserts that his first love is Marathi film, TV and stage. Jadhav also acted in a Bengali movie named Ami Shubhash Bolchi with Mithun Chakraborty as the lead. Referred to in the media as the "Comedy King of Marathi Cinema".

== Personal life ==
He is married to Trupti, they have two daughters.

== Career ==
He made his acting debut from DD Sahyadri's Ek Shunya Baburao. Then he was also seen in supporting roles in Hasa Chakat Fu, Ghadlay Bighadlay, Apan Yanna Pahilat Ka?, etc. In 2004, he made his film debut from Kedar Shinde's Aga Bai Arrecha!. Then he received offer of Jatra movie. He made his bollywood debut in 2006 in Rohit Shetty's movie Golmaal: Fun Unlimited as Sattu Supari. In the same year, he did a play named Lochya Zaala Re. Later he has done many notable films including Bakula Namdeo Ghotale, Saade Maade Teen, De Dhakka, Mi Shivajiraje Bhosale Boltoy!, many more. He won the Best Comedian award in Maharashtra State Film Awards in 2008 for the movie De Dhakka. He also made his debut in Bengali movie Ami Shubhash Bolchi. He was a contestant on Sony TV's Comedy Circus Ka Naya Daur, Kahani Comedy Circus Ki, Comedy Circus Ke Ajoobe. He also appeared in Johny Aala Re, Baa Bahoo Aur Baby, Sarabhai vs Sarabhai and Comedy Nights Bachao. He also was a contestant of Nach Baliye 8 with his wife. He also judge many reality shows including Maharashtracha Dancing Superstar, Dance Maharashtra Dance. In 2016, he did a play named Gela Udat. He also part of Simmba as Ganesh Tawde. In 2021, he was seen in Radhe as Ranjeet Mawani.

== Filmography ==
=== Feature films ===
Key
| † | Denotes films that have not yet been released |

List of Siddharth Jadhav film credits
| Year | Title | Role | Language | Ref. |
|---|---|---|---|---|
| 2004 | Aga Bai Arrecha! | Siddhu | Marathi | |
| 2006 | Jatra | Siddhu | Marathi | |
| 2006 | Outsourced | Gola Vendor | Hindi | |
| 2006 | Changbhal | Siddhu | Marathi | |
| 2006 | Majha Navra Tujhi Bayko | Gangya | Marathi | |
| 2006 | Golmaal: Fun Unlimited | Sattu Supari | Hindi | |
| 2007 | Hyancha Kahi Nem Nahi | Siddhu | Marathi | |
| 2007 | Bakula Namdeo Ghotale | Namdev | Marathi | |
| 2007 | Zabardast | Chota Dambis | Marathi | |
| 2007 | Saade Maade Teen | Baban | Marathi | |
| 2008 | De Dhakka | Dhanaji | Marathi | |
| 2008 | Golmaal Returns | Lucky's Assistant | Hindi | |
| 2008 | Uladhaal | Sikander | Marathi | |
| 2008 | Full 3 Dhamaal | Bus Conductor | Marathi | |
| 2008 | Baap Re Baap Dokyala Taap | Hawaldar Nimbalkar | Marathi | |
| 2008 | Galgale Nighale | Andya Banjo | Marathi | |
| 2009 | Sumbaran | Uttam | Marathi | |
| 2009 | Saline Kela Ghotala | Dinya Gadbade | Marathi | |
| 2009 | Gaav Tasa Changala | Jangya | Marathi | |
| 2009 | Me Shivajiraje Bhosale Boltoy | Usman Parkar | Marathi | |
| 2010 | Shikshanachya Aaicha Gho | Ibrahim Bhai | Marathi | |
| 2010 | Huppa Huiyya | Hanmya | Marathi | |
| 2010 | City of Gold | Ganesh 'Ganya' | Marathi | |
| 2010 | Lalbaug Parel: Zali Mumbai Sonyachi | Speed Breaker | Marathi | |
| 2010 | Kshanbhar Vishranti | Vishnu Pant Jagdale | Marathi | |
| 2010 | Paradh | Yashwant | Marathi | |
| 2010 | Irada Pakka | Rohit | Marathi | |
| 2010 | Bhairu Pailvan Ki Jai | Bhairu Pehlwan | Marathi | |
| 2010 | Target | Sattar | Marathi | |
| 2011 | Fakta Ladh Mhana | West Indies | Marathi | |
| 2011 | Superstar | Ranga | Marathi | |
| 2011 | Mamachya Rashila Bhacha | Kishan | Marathi | |
| 2011 | Bhaucha Dhakka | Bhau | Marathi | |
| 2012 | Kutumb | Magic Mamu | Marathi | |
| 2012 | Ami Shubhash Bolchi | Usman Mondal | Bengali | |
| 2012 | Idiots | Qayyum | Marathi | |
| 2013 | Premacha Jhol Jhal | Popat Navre | Marathi | |
| 2013 | Kho-Kho | Adimanav | Marathi | |
| 2013 | Dham Dhoom | | Marathi | |
| 2013 | Time Please | Himmatrao Dhondepatil | Marathi | |
| 2014 | Priyatama | Parsha | Marathi | |
| 2014 | Powder | Raghu Silver | Hindi | |
| 2015 | Gour Hari Dastaan: The Freedom File | Tout | Hindi | |
| 2015 | Dholki | Lala | Marathi | |
| 2015 | Razzakar | Hari | Marathi | |
| 2015 | Dream Mall | Mall Security | Marathi | |
| 2015 | Madhyamvarg: The Middle Class | Inspector Vijay Raut | Marathi | |
| 2015 | Shasan | Mahadeo | Marathi | |
| 2016 | Duniya Geli Tel Lavat | Raja | Marathi | |
| 2017 | Manus Ek Mati | Vijay | Marathi | |
| 2017 | Faster Fene | Ambadas | Marathi | |
| 2018 | Ye Re Ye Re Paisa | Sunny | Marathi | |
| 2018 | Shikari | TK | Marathi | |
| 2018 | Mauli | Kadaknath | Marathi | |
| 2018 | Ghar Hota Menacha | | Marathi | |
| 2018 | Simmba | Sub-Inspector Santosh Tawade | Hindi | |
| 2019 | Khichik | Mithun | Marathi | |
| 2019 | Sarva Line Vyasta Ahet | Babya | Marathi | |
| 2020 | Dhurala | Hanumantha Ubhe (Cement Sheth) | Marathi | |
| 2021 | Radhe | Ranjeet Mawani | Hindi | |
| 2021 | Sooryavanshi | Sub-Inspector Santosh Tawade | Hindi | Cameo appearance |
| 2022 | Zombivli | Special appearance in song 'Angat Alaya' | Marathi | |
| 2022 | Lochya Zaala Re | Maanav | Marathi | |
| 2022 | Tamasha Live | Sutradhar | Marathi | |
| 2022 | De Dhakka 2 | Dhanaji | Marathi | |
| 2022 | Cirkus | Momo | Hindi | |
| 2022 | Ved | Suresh | Marathi | |
| 2022 | Baalbhaarti | Rahul Desai | Marathi | |
| 2023 | Aflatoon | Shree | Marathi | |
| 2024 | Lagna Kallol | Maruti | Marathi | |
| 2024 | Navra Maza Navsacha 2 | Yede-Patil | Marathi | |
| 2024 | Singham Again | Senior Inspector Santhosh Tawade | Hindi | |
| 2024 | Ek Daav Bhootacha | Madan | Marathi | |
| 2025 | Ata Thambaycha Naay! | Maruti Kadam | Marathi | |
| 2025 | Ye Re Ye Re Paisa 3 | Sunny | Marathi | |
| 2025 | Aatli Baatmi Futli | Sachin | Marathi | |
| 2025 | Punha Shivajiraje Bhosale | Usman Khillare | Marathi | |
| 2026 | Gandhi Talks | Mangu | Silent | |
| 2026 | Punha Ekda Sade Made Teen | Baban | Marathi | |
| 2026 | Raja Shivaji | Cameo in "Chatrapati" somg | Marathi; Hindi | |
| 2026 | Jaago Mohan Pyaare † | TBA | Marathi | |
| 2026 | Eetha | | Hindi | |

=== Stage ===
List of Siddharth Jadhav stage credits
| Year | Title | Role | Language | Ref. |
|---|---|---|---|---|
| 2006 | Lochya Zaala Re | Maanav | Marathi | |
| 2010 | Mi Shahrukh Manjarsumbhekar | Shahrukh Manjarsumbhekar | Marathi | |
| 2012 | Jaago Mohan Pyaare | Mohan | Marathi | |
| 2016 | Gela Udat | Maruti | Marathi | |

=== Television ===
List of Siddharth Jadhav television credits
| Year | Title | Role | Channel | Ref. |
|---|---|---|---|---|
| 2004 | Ek Shunya Baburao | Supporting role | DD Sahyadri | |
| 2004 | Hasa Chatak Fu | Supporting role | Zee Marathi | |
| 2004 | Ghadlay Bighadlay | Supporting role | Zee Marathi | |
| 2005 | Apan Yanna Hasalat Ka? | | | |
| 2005 | Teen Tera Pimpalzad | | | |
| 2005 | Daar Ughada Na Gade | | Star Pravah | |
| 2006 | Johny Aala Re | Various | Zee TV | |
| 2006 | Baa Bahoo Aur Baby | Rajja | StarPlus | |
| 2007 | Sarabhai vs Sarabhai | Thief | Star One | |
| 2011 | Comedy Circus Ka Naya Daur | Contestant | SET | |
| 2011–2012 | Kahani Comedy Circus Ki | Contestant | SET | |
| 2012–2013 | Comedy Circus Ke Ajoobe | Contestant | SET | |
| 2014 | Maharashtracha Dancing Superstar | Judge | Star Pravah | |
| 2016 | Comedy Nights Bachao | Contestant | Colors TV | |
| 2017 | Nach Baliye 8 | Contestant | StarPlus | |
| 2018 | Dance Maharashtra Dance | Judge | Zee Yuva | |
| 2021 | Bigg Boss Marathi 3 | Assistant host | Colors Marathi | |
| 2021–2022 | He Tar Kahich Nay | Special Guest | Zee Marathi | |
| 2022–2026 | Aata Hou De Dhingana | Host | Star Pravah | |

== Awards ==
- Filmfare Marathi Awards – Best Supporting Actor – Dhurala
- Sakal Premiere Awards 2019 (Entertainer Of The Year' Award)
- Loksatta Tarun Tejankit award 2021.
- Marathi Paaul Padate Pudhe Puraskaar: Zee Chitra Gaurav Puraskaar – 2021
- Maharashtracha Favourite Kon?: Favourite Comedian − 2013 Film − Kho Kho
- Maharashtracha Favourite Kon?: Favourite Supporting Actor − 2010 Film − Lalbaug Parel
- Yuva Balgandharva Puraskaar 2007
- Maharashtracha Favourite Kon?: Favourite Villain − 2008 Film − Galgale Nighale
- Maharashtracha Favourite Kon?: Favourite Comedian − 2008 Film − De Dhakka
- Best Comedian: Maharashtra State Film Awards −2008-Film- De Dhakka
- Akhil Bhartiya Natya Parishad- Natyasampada Sponsored Shankar Ghanekar Smriti Puraskkar – 2004
- Maharashtra Rajya Professional Natya Spardha " Best Actor Award-2004-05" Play- "Jago Mohan Pyaare"
- Maharashtra Rajya Professional Natya Spardha " Best Actor Award-2003-04" Play- "Lochya Zala Re"
- Ekata Cultural Academy :- V.Shantaram Memorial Acting Award – 2005–06
- Maharashtra Kala Niketan Acting Award 2005–06
- Maharashtra Kala Niketan Acting Award 2005–06
- DD Metro Superstar :- IInd rank Acting Competition
- MANY Awards in Youth Festival Organised by University Of Mumbai – Gold and Silver Medals In Acting / Mime/ Mimicry/ Monoacting
- Ravikiran Balnatya Spardha 1996– Best Actor IIRd Rank
- Maharashtra Kala Niketan Acting Award 2005–06 Indian National Theatre (INT) – Best Comedian Award – 2002–03 – One Act Play "Laxminarayanacha Joda" Writer- Director Devendra Pem

== See also ==
- Swapnil Joshi
- Bharat Jadhav
- Kedar Shinde
- Ankush Chaudhari
