= Kedar Shinde =

Marathi actor and director (born 1973)

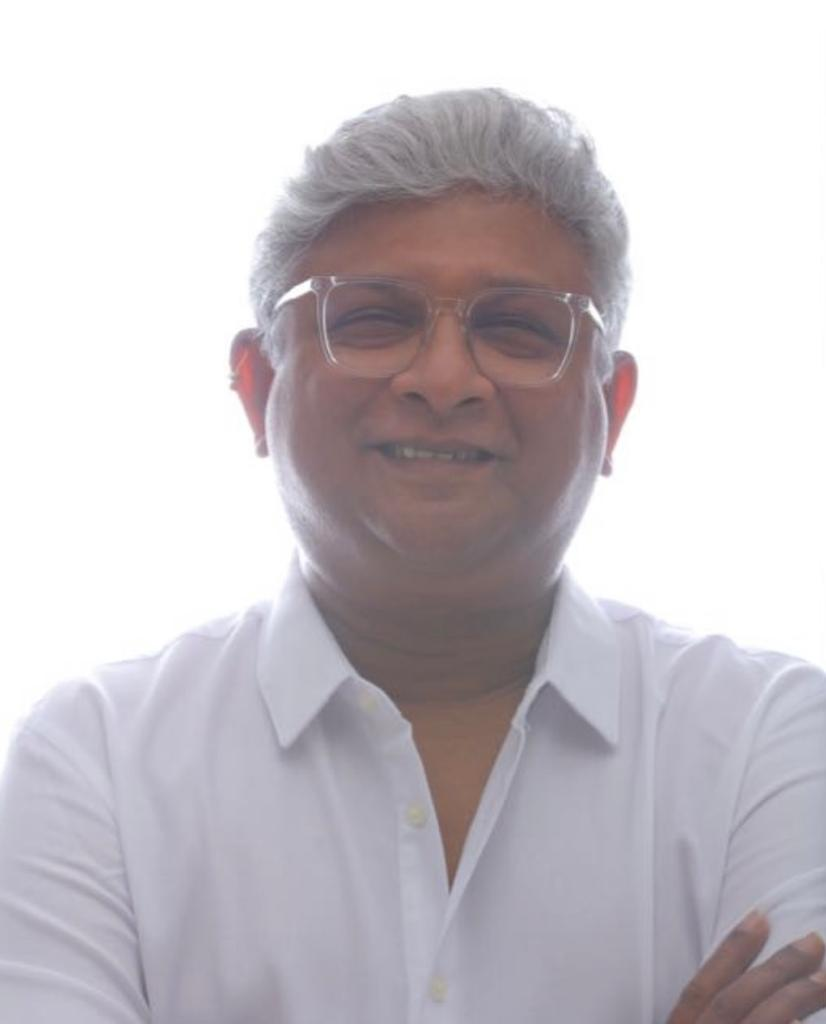
- Born: 16 January 1973 (age 53); Mumbai, Maharashtra, India
- Occupations: Film director; Screenwriter
- Spouse: Bela Shinde (m. 1996)
- Children: Sana Shinde
- Relatives: Shahir Sable (maternal grandfather)
- Website: kedarshinde.com

Kedar Shinde (Marathi pronunciation: [ked̪aːɾ ʃin̪d̪e]; born 16 January 1973) is an Indian film director and screenwriter from Mumbai, India.

== Personal life and family ==
Kedar Shinde was born on 16 January 1973 in Mumbai, India. Shinde completed his school education in Mumbai. He is the maternal grandson of noted Marathi Folk Singer, Shahir Sable. His maternal aunt – Charusheela Sable is a Marathi actor of repute

Shinde married Bela Shinde in 1996. The couple has a daughter, Sana Shinde (born 1998).

== Career ==
He had started his career with Maharashtrachi Lokdhara (Folk dances of Maharashtra). Maharashtrachi Lokadhara had performed all over India as a renowned troupe formed by Shahir Sable showcasing all native dance forms of Maharashtra.

Following the success of Baipan Bhari Deva, he served as the Head of Programming of Colors Marathi channel for Viacom18.

== Filmography ==
=== Films ===
Key
†	Denotes films that have not yet been released

Year	Title	Language	Director	Writer
2004	Aga Bai Arrecha!	Marathi	Yes	Yes
2006	Jatra: Hyalagaad Re Tyalagaad	Marathi	Yes	Yes
2006	Yanda Kartavya Aahe	Marathi	Yes	Yes
2006	Majha Navra Tujhi Bayko	Marathi	Yes	Yes
2007	Mukkam Post London	Marathi	Yes	No
2008	Yancha Kahi Nem Nahi	Marathi	Yes	No
2008	Galgale Nighale	Marathi	Yes	No
2008	Bakula Namdev Ghotale	Marathi	Yes	Yes
2010	Irada Pakka	Marathi	Yes	No
2010	On Duty 24 Taas	Marathi	Yes	No
2010	Toh Baat Pakki!	Hindi	Yes	No
2013	Kho Kho	Marathi	Yes	No
2013	Shrimant Damodar Pant	Marathi	Yes	No
2015	Aga Bai Arrechyaa 2	Marathi	Yes	Yes
2017	Rangeela Rayabaa	Marathi	Yes	No
2023	Maharashtra Shahir	Marathi	Yes	No
2023	Baipan Bhari Deva	Marathi	Yes	No
2025	Zapuk Zupuk	Marathi	Yes	No
2026	Aga Aga Sunbai! Kay Mhantay Sasubai?	Marathi	Yes	No
2026	Gana Dhaav Re †	Marathi	Yes	No
2026	Aaipan Bhari Deva †	Marathi	Yes	No

=== TV shows ===
Title	Language	Channel
Shriyut Gangadhar Tipre	Marathi	Zee Marathi
Ghadalay Bighadalay	Marathi	Zee Marathi
Hasa Chakat Fu	Marathi	Zee Marathi
Saheb Bibi Ani Mi	Marathi	Zee Marathi
Aali Lahar Kela Kahar	Marathi	Colors Marathi
Maharashtrachi Lokdhara (TV)	Marathi	Zee Marathi
Madhu Ithe Aani Chandra Tithe	Marathi	Zee Marathi
Kya Haal, Mr. Paanchal?	Hindi	Star Bharat
Super Sisters	Hindi	SAB TV
Tera Kya Hoga Alia	Hindi	SAB TV
Sukhi Mansacha Sadra	Marathi	Colors Marathi
Sargam Ki Sadhesati	Hindi	Sony Entertainment
Anandiba aur Emily	Hindi	Star Plus
Indrayani	Marathi	Colors Marathi

=== Plays ===
Title	Language	Notes
Sahi Re Sahi	Marathi	
Lochya Jhala Re	Marathi	
Shreemant Damodarpant	Marathi	
Tu Tu Mi Mi	Marathi	
Punha Sahi Re Sahi	Marathi	
Gopala Re Gopala	Marathi	
Amachya Sarakhe Amhich	Marathi	
Dhyan Ta Dhyan	Marathi	
Gela Udat	Marathi	
Raju, Rajaram aur Main	Hindi	Hindi adaptation of Punha Sahi Re Sahi
Phari Ek Vaar - Ame Lai Gaya Tame Rahi Gaya	Gujarati	Gujarati adaptation of Punha Sahi Re Sahi
The Play That Goes Wrong (Adaptation)	English	Indian adaptation of The Play That Goes Wrong
Naatak Nu Naatak Naa Naatak	Gujarati	Gujarati adaptation of The Play That Goes Wrong

== Accolades ==
Kedar Shinde was listed in Forbes India's 2023 Showstoppers, being the only Marathi director to achieve this feat.

Film	Year	Award	Category	Result	Ref
Maharashtra Shahir	2023	Fakt Marathi Cine Sanman	Best Director Critics	Won	
Maharashtra Shahir	2023	TV9 Aapla Bioscope Awards	Best Director	Nominated	
Maharashtra Shahir	2024	Maharashtracha Favourite Kon?	Favourite Director	Nominated	
Baipan Bhaari Deva	2024	City Cine Awards	Best Director	Won	
Baipan Bhaari Deva	2024	MaTa Sanman	Best Director	Won	
Baipan Bhaari Deva	2024	Filmfare Awards Marathi	Best Director	Nominated	
Baipan Bhaari Deva	2024	Maharashtracha Favourite Kon?	Favourite Director	Nominated	
