= Shri Shivraj Ashtak =

Indian film series

- Created by: Digpal Lanjekar
- Years: 2018–present

Films and television
- Films: Farzand (2018); Fatteshikast (2019); Pawankhind (2022); Sher Shivraj (2022); Subhedar (2023); Shivrayancha Chhava(2024); Ranapati Shivray: Swari Agra (2026)

Audio
- Soundtracks: Farzand; Fatteshikast; Pawankhind; Sher Shivraj; Subhedar; Shivrayancha Chhava

Miscellaneous
- Box office: Total (7 films): est. ₹141.26 crore

Shri Shivraj Ashtak is an Indian Marathi-language historical drama film series created by Digpal Lanjekar. The franchise began as an eight-part film series written and directed by Lanjekar, based on the history of the Maratha Empire. The films in the series are Farzand (2018), Fatteshikast (2019), Pawankhind (2022), Sher Shivraj (2022), Subhedar (2023), Shivrayancha Chhava (2024), Ranapati Shivray: Swari Agra (2026).

== Feature films ==
Film	India release date	Directed by	Screenplay by	Story by	Produced by
Farzand	1 June 2018	Digpal Lanjekar	Digpal Lanjekar	Digpal Lanjekar	Swami Samarth Creations LLP
Fatteshikast	15 November 2019	Digpal Lanjekar	Digpal Lanjekar	Digpal Lanjekar	Almonds Creations
Pawankhind	18 February 2022	Digpal Lanjekar	Digpal Lanjekar	Digpal Lanjekar	Almonds Creations
Sher Shivraj	22 April 2022	Digpal Lanjekar	Digpal Lanjekar	Digpal Lanjekar	Mumbai Movie Studios Pvt. Ltd. Raajwarasa Productions Mulakshar Productions
Subhedar	25 August 2023	Digpal Lanjekar	Digpal Lanjekar	Digpal Lanjekar	Mulakshar Productions Raajwarasa Productions Prithviraj Productions Rajau Productions Parampara Productions
Shivrayancha Chhava	16 February 2024	Digpal Lanjekar	Digpal Lanjekar	Digpal Lanjekar	Malhar Picture Company; Everest Entertainment
Ranapati Shivray: Swari Agra	6 February 2026	Digpal Lanjekar	Digpal Lanjekar	Digpal Lanjekar	Panorama Studios

== Overview ==
=== Farzand (2018) ===
The story begins with the fall of Tanaji Malusare, in capturing Kondana fort near Pune from a Mughal garrison in 1670. Three years later, when Shivaji Maharaj's coronation to be held, Shivaji Maharaj wishes that he is crowned only when his kingdom and his people have peace and security. Panhala fort is still under the command of a cruel general, Beshak Khan, of the Adil Shah of Bijapur, whose forces harass the peasantry. The previous attempt to capture the fort in 1666, which he had held briefly in 1660 had failed. To recapture the fort, a mission is planned and Shivaji appoints Kondaji Farzand general for the mission. Farzand picks 60 soldiers for an assault on the fort defended by the 2500-strong garrison. Bahirji Naik, the spy, and an informer Kesar helped in defeating 2500 soldiers of the enemy to win the Panhala fort in just three and half hours.

=== Fatteshikast (2019) ===
The film depicts the historical encounter between Shivaji Maharaj I and the subahdar and general of the Mughal army, Shaista Khan at Lal Mahal in Pune.

=== Pawankhind (2022) ===
The film depicts the historical rearguard last stand that took place on 13 July 1660 at a mountain pass in the vicinity of fort Vishalgad, near the city of Kolhapur, Maharashtra, India between the Maratha Warrior Baji Prabhu Deshpande and Siddi Masud of Adilshah Sultanate, known as Battle of Pavan Khind.

=== Sher Shivraj (2022) ===
It is the story of the great Maratha king, Chhatrapati Shivaji Maharaj, where he defeated Afzal Khan with brilliant tactics and courage. It also focuses on the psychological techniques Maharaj exhibited during the mission.

=== Subhedar (2023) ===
Subedar Tanaji Malusare leaves Raiba's marriage and first goes to battle to conquer Kondhana fort and fights like a lion, after conquering the fort the fort is named Sinhagad.

=== Shivrayancha Chhava (2024) ===
The second Chhatrapati of the Maratha Empire Sambhaji Maharaj, commonly known as Shambhuraje, ruled from 1681 to 1689 and is the subject of the movie. Chhatrapati Shivaji Maharaj, the Maratha Empire's founder, had him as his eldest son.

== Cast and characters ==
Actor	Film						
Actor	Farzand (2018)	Fatteshikast (2019)	Pawankhind (2022)	Sher Shivraj (2022)	Subhedar (2023)	Shivrayancha Chhava (2024)	Ranapati Shivray: Swari Agra (2026)
Chinmay Mandlekar	Chhatrapati Shivaji Maharaj	Chhatrapati Shivaji Maharaj	Chhatrapati Shivaji Maharaj	Chhatrapati Shivaji Maharaj	Chhatrapati Shivaji Maharaj	Chhatrapati Shivaji Maharaj	Chhatrapati Shivaji Maharaj
Abhijeet Shwetchandra	Chhatrapati Shivaji Maharaj	Chhatrapati Shivaji Maharaj	Chhatrapati Shivaji Maharaj	Chhatrapati Shivaji Maharaj	Chhatrapati Shivaji Maharaj	Chhatrapati Shivaji Maharaj	Chhatrapati Shivaji Maharaj
Mrinal Kulkarni	Rajmata Jijabai	Rajmata Jijabai	Rajmata Jijabai	Rajmata Jijabai	Rajmata Jijabai	Rajmata Jijabai	Rajmata Jijabai
Prasad Oak	Bahirji Naik						
Harish Dudhade	Ganoji Kawle	Bahirji Naik	Bahirji Naik				
Digpal Lanjekar				Bahirji Naik	Bahirji Naik	Bahirji Naik	Bahirji Naik
Ankit Mohan	Sardar Kondaji Farzand	Sarsenapati Yesaji Kank	Shrimant Rayajirao Bandal				
Neha Joshi	Kamali						
Mrunmayee Deshpande	Kesar	Kesar		Kesar			
Sameer Dharmadhikari	Sardar Beshak Khan	Naamdar Khan	Siddi Johar	Kanhoji Jedhe	Shelar Mama	Aurangzeb	Aurangzeb
Ganesh Yadav	Tanaji Malusare						
Ajay Purkar	Motyaji Khalekar	Tanaji Malusare	Baji Prabhu Deshpande	Tanaji Malusare	Tanaji Malusare		
Nikhil Raut	Kisna	Kisna					
Pravin Tarde	Martya Ramoshi						
Astad Kale	Gundoji	Kartalab Khan Uzbek	Siddi Masud	Vishwas Dighe	Vishwas Dighe		
Rishi Saxena		Fatteh Khan	Rustam Zaman	Fazal Khan	Kubad Khan		
Rajan Bhise	Hiroji Indulkar		Kanhoji Jedhe				
Ganesh Tidke	Budhaji	Suryaji Malusare					
Anup Soni		Shaista Khan					
Vikram Gaikwad		Sardar Chimnaji Mudgal Deshpande	Netaji Palkar	Netaji Palkar			
Akshay Waghmare		Sardar Koyaji Naik Bandal	Sardar Koyaji Naik Bandal	Pilaji Gole			
Trupti Toradmal		Rai Bagan					
Bhushan Patil						Chhatrapathi Sambhaji Bhosale	
Ruchi Savarn		Soyarabai	Soyarabai				
Prajakta Mali			Shrimant Bhavanibai Bandal				
Surabhi Bhave			Matoshri Sonai Deshpande				
Bipin Surve			Shambu Singh Jadhavrao	Baji Sarjerao Jedhe	Baji Sarjerao Jedhe		
Kshitee Jog			Badi Begum				
Varsha Usgaonkar				Badi Begum			
Dipti Ketkar			Matoshri Dipaiaau Bandal	Matoshri Dipaiaau Bandal			
Kunal Dhumal			Sarjerao Jedhe	Kondaji Kank			

== Release and revenue ==
Film	Release date	Budget	Box office revenue
Farzand	1 June 2018	Not known	₹10 crore
Fatteshikast	15 November 2019	Not known	₹5.65 crore
Pawankhind	18 February 2022	Not known	₹75 crore
Sher Shivraj	22 April 2022	Not known	₹17 crore
Subhedar	25 August 2023	₹10 crore	₹18 crore
Shivrayancha Chhava	16 February 2024	₹8 crore	₹14 crore
Ranapati Shivray: Swari Agra	6 February 2026	₹7 crore	₹1.61 crore
Total			₹141.26 crore
