= List of Marathi films of 2022 =

This is a list of Marathi (Indian Marathi-language) films that are scheduled to release in 2022.

The Marathi cinema recorded its highest-ever box-office earnings in 2022, with total collections of ₹268 crore and footfalls reaching 2.60 crore.

== Box office collection ==
The List of highest-grossing Marathi films released in 2022, by worldwide box office gross revenue, are as follows.

The rank of the films in the following depends on the worldwide gross.

| Rank | Film | Studio (s) | Worldwide gross | Ref. |
|---|---|---|---|---|
| 1 | Ved | Mumbai Film Company | ₹75 crore (US$7.9 million) | |
| 2 | Pawankhind | Almonds Creations | ₹75 crore (US$7.9 million) | |
| 3 | Dharmaveer | Zee Studios; Sahil Motion Arts | ₹26 crore (US$2.7 million) | |
| 4 | Har Har Mahadev | Zee Studios; Shree Ganesh Marketing And Films | ₹25 crore (US$2.6 million) | |
| 5 | Chandramukhi | Planet Marathi; Golden Ratio Films; Flying Dragon Entertainment; Creative Vibe | ₹24 crore (US$2.5 million) | |
| 6 | Sarsenapati Hambirrao | Urvita Productions | ₹17 crore (US$1.8 million) | |
| 6 | Sher Shivraj | Mumbai Movie Studios Pvt. Ltd.; Raajwarasa Productions; Mulakshar Productions | ₹17 crore (US$1.8 million) | |

== January–June ==
| Opening | | Title | Director | Cast | Ref. |
|---|---|---|---|---|---|
| J A N | 14 | Story Of Laagir | Roheet Rao Narsinge | Roheet Rao Narsinge, Chaitali Chavan, Sanjay Khapre | |
| J A N | 14 | Coffee | Nitin Kamble | Spruha Joshi, Siddharth Chandekar, Kashyap Parulekar, Mohan Joshi | |
| J A N | 14 | Nay Varanbhat Loncha Kon Nay Koncha | Mahesh Manjrekar | Chhaya Kadam, Shashank Shende, Kashmera Shah, Umesh Jagtap | |
| J A N | 26 | Zombivli | Aditya Sarpotdar | Amey Wagh, Vaidehi Parshurami, Lalit Prabhakar | |
| F E B | 4 | Faas | Avinash Kolte | Upendra Limaye, Sayaji Shinde, Kamlesh Sawant, Pallavi Palkar | |
| F E B | 4 | Panghrun | Mahesh Manjrekar | Gauri Ingawale, Amol Bavadekar, Rohit Phalke | |
| F E B | 4 | Lochya Zaala Re | Paritosh Painter, Ravi Adhikari | Ankush Chaudhari, Vaidehi Parshurami, Siddarth Jadhav | |
| F E B | 11 | Soyrik | Makarand Mane | Nitish Chavan, Manasi Bhawalkar | |
| F E B | 11 | Ka R Deva | Ranjit Jadhav | Monalisa Bagal, Mayur Lad | |
| F E B | 18 | Pawankhind | Digpal Lanjekar | Chinmay Mandlekar, Mrinal Kulkarni, Ankit Mohan, Ajay Purkar, Prajakta Mali | |
| F E B | 25 | Luckdown Be Positive | Santosh Manjrekar | Ankush Chaudhari, Prajakta Mali | |
| F E B | 25 | Chabuk | Kalpesh Bhandarkar | Sameer Dharmadhikari, Smita Shewale, Milind Shinde | |
| F E B | 25 | Pondicherry | Sachin Kundalkar | Sai Tamhankar, Amruta Khanvilkar, Vaibhav Tatwawadi | |
| M A R | 4 | 143 | Yogesh Bhosale | Sheetal Ahirrao, Vrushabh Shah | |
| M A R | 4 | Jhatka | Ajinkya Upasani | Gaurav Upasani, Purniemaa Dey | |
| M A R | 11 | Ek Number | Milind Zumber Kavde | Prathamesh Parab | |
| A P R | 1 | Vishu | Mayur Madhukar Shinde | Gashmeer Mahajani, Mrinmayee Godbole | |
| A P R | 1 | Me Vasantrao | Nipun Dharmadhikari | Rahul Deshpande, Pushkaraj Chirputkar, Amey Wagh | |
| A P R | 22 | Sher Shivraj | Digpal Lanjekar | Chinmay Mandlekar, Mrinal Kulkarni, Ravindra Mankani, Mukesh Rishi | |
| A P R | 29 | Chandramukhi | Prasad Oak | Amruta Khanvilkar, Adinath Kothare, Mrunmayee Deshpande | |
| M A Y | 6 | Dil Dimag Aur Batti | Hrishikesh Gupte | Dilip Prabhavalkar, Sonali Kulkarni, Vandana Gupte, Pushkar Shrotri, Kishore Kadam, Anand Ingle, Vaibhav Mangle, Mayuresh Pem, Sanskruti Balgude, Sakhi Gokhale, Pushkaraj Chirputkar, Meghana Erande, Vineet Bhonde | |
| M A Y | 6 | Bharat Majha Desh Aahe | Pandurang Jadhav | Rajveersingh Raje Gaikwad, Devanshi Sawant, Mangesh Desai, Shashank Shende, Hemangi Kavi, Chhaya Kadam | |
| M A Y | 13 | Adrushya | Kabir Lal | Manjari Fadnis, Pushkar Jog, Anant Jog, Usha Nadkarni | |
| M A Y | 13 | Dharmaveer | Pravin Tarde | Prasad Oak, Gashmeer Mahajani, Shruti Marathe, Kshitish Date | |
| M A Y | 27 | Sarsenapati Hambirrao | Pravin Tarde | Pravin Tarde, Gashmeer Mahajani | |
| J U N | 3 | Zollywood | Trushant Ingle | Ajit Khobragade, Ashwini Ladekar, Dinkar Gawande, Kajal Rangari | |
| J U N | 3 | Irsal | Aniket Bondre | Vikram Suryakant, Shivani Moze, Mohan Agashe, Shashank Shende, Anil Nagarkar, Madhuri Pawar | |
| J U N | 7 | Bhirkit | Anup Jagdale | Girish Kulkarni, Kushal Badrike, Monalisa Bagal, Tanaji Galgunde | |
| J U N | 10 | Funral | Vivek Dubey | Aroh Welankar, Tanvi Barve | |
| J U N | 10 | Anya | Simmy | Atul Kulkarni, Raima Sen, Prathamesh Parab, Bhushan Pradhan, Tejashree Pradhan | |
| J U N | 10 | Majnu | Shivaji Doltade | Nitish Chavan, Rohan Patil, Shwetlana Ahire | |
| J U N | 17 | Aathva Rang Premacha | Khusboo Sinnha | Rinku Rajguru, Vishal Aanand, Makrand Deshpande | |
| J U N | 17 | Medium Spicy | Mohit Takalkar | Sai Tamhankar, Parna Pethe, Lalit Prabhakar | |
| J U N | 24 | Y | Ajit Suryakant Wadikar | Mukta Barve, Prajakta Mali, Nandu Madhav | |

== July–December ==
| Opening | | Title | Director | Cast | Ref. |
|---|---|---|---|---|---|
| J U L | 15 | Tamasha Live | Sanjay Jadhav | Sonalee Kulkarni, Sachit Patil, Siddharth Jadhav, Hemangi Kavi | |
| J U L | 22 | Ananya | Pratap Phad | Hruta Durgule, Amey Wagh, Suvrat Joshi | |
| J U L | 29 | Timepass 3 | Ravi Jadhav | Hruta Durgule, Prathamesh Parab | |
| A U G | 5 | De Dhakka 2 | Mahesh Manjrekar, Sudesh Manjrekar | Shivaji Satam, Makarand Anaspure, Siddhartha Jadhav, Medha Manjrekar | |
| A U G | 5 | Ekda Kaay Zala | Saleel Kulkarni | Urmilla Kothare, Sumeet Raghvan, Mohan Agashe, Suhas Joshi, Pushkar Shrotri | |
| A U G | 18 | Takatak 2 | Milind Kavde | Prathamesh Parab, Akshay Kelkar, Pranali Bhalerao | |
| A U G | 19 | Daagadi Chawl 2 | Chandrakant Kanse | Makrand Deshpande, Ankush Chaudhari, Pooja Sawant | |
| A U G | 26 | Samaira | Rishi Deshpande | Ketaki Narayan, Ankur Rathee, Satish Pulekar | |
| S E P | 16 | Roop Nagar Ke Cheetey | Vihan Suryavanshi | Karan Parab, Kunal Shukla, Aayushi Bhave, Sana Prabhu, Mugdha Chaphekar, Hemal Ingle | |
| S E P | 16 | Boyz 3 | Vishal Devrukhkar | Parth Bhalerao, Sumant Shinde, Pratik Lad, Vidula Choughule | |
| S E P | 23 | Raada | Ritesh Narwade | Shilpa Thakre, Milind Gunaji, Nishigandha Wad, Sanjay Khapre, Ganesh Acharya | |
| O C T | 5 | Shivpratap Garudjhep | Kartik Kendhe | Amol Kolhe, Prateeksha Lonkar, Yatin Karyekar, Alka Kaushal, Manava Naik, Adi Irani, Shailesh Datar | |
| O C T | 5 | Aapdi Thaapdi | Anand Karir | Shreyas Talpade, Mukta Barve | |
| O C T | 7 | Hawa Hawai | Mahesh Tilekar | Nimisha Sajayan, Siddharth Jadhav, Ankit Mohan, Varsha Usgaonkar | |
| O C T | 25 | Har Har Mahadev | Abhijeet Deshpande | Subodh Bhave, Sharad Kelkar, Amruta Khanvilkar, Sayali Sanjeev | |
| N O V | 4 | Mann Kasturi Re | Sanket Mane | Tejasswi Prakash, Abhinay Berde | |
| N O V | 4 | 36 Gunn | Samit Kakkad | Santosh Juvekar, Vijay Patkar, Purva Pawar, Pushkar Shrotri | |
| N O V | 4 | Palyad | Shailesh Bhimrao Dupare | Shashank Shende, Devika Daftardar, Ruchit Ninave, Gajesh Kamble | |
| N O V | 18 | Sunny | Hemant Dhome | Lalit Prabhakar, Kshitee Jog, Chinmay Mandlekar | |
| N O V | 25 | Jeta | Yogesh Mahajan | Snehal Deshmukh, Nitish Chavan, Sharad Goyekar, Aniket Kelkar | |
| D E C | 2 | Ekdam Kadak | Ganesh Shinde | Parth Bhalerao, Tanaji Galgunde, Bhagyashree Mote, Gayatri Jadhav | |
| D E C | 2 | Baalbhaarti | Nitin Nandan | Siddharth Jadhav, Nandita Patkar, Abhijeet Khandkekar | |
| D E C | 9 | Fatwa | Pratik Gautam | Pratik Gautam, Shraddha Bhagat | |
| D E C | 16 | Dhondi Champya - Ek Prem Katha | Dnyanesh Bhalekar | Bharat Jadhav, Vaibhav Mangle, Nikhil Chavan, Sayli Patil | |
| D E C | 30 | Ved | Riteish Deshmukh | Riteish Deshmukh, Genelia Deshmukh, Jiya Shankar, Ashok Saraf | |
