= V. Shantaram Special Contribution Award =

Honorary film award

- State award for contributions to Marathi cinema
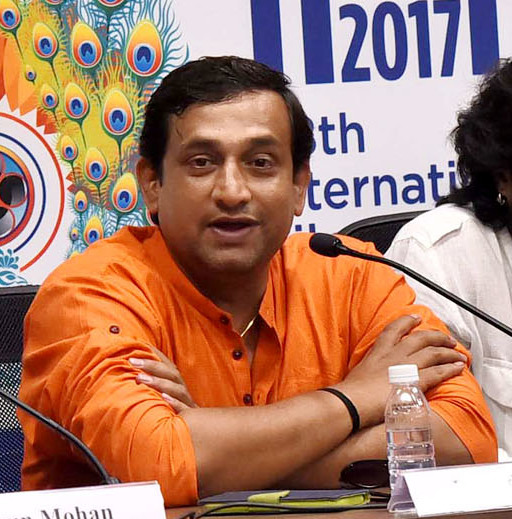
- The 2025 recipient: Prasad Oak
- Awarded for: Contribution to Marathi Cinema.
- Sponsored by: Government of Maharashtra
- Rewards: Gold Medal; ₹ 2,00,000
- First award: 2008
- Final award: 2025
- Most recent winner: Prasad Oak

Highlights
- Total awarded: 15
- First winner: Mahesh Kothare

The V. Shantaram Special Contribution Award, instituted in 2009 for the Maharashtra State Film Awards is an award given by the Government of Maharashtra to long-serving film personalities in Marathi cinema. It was named V. Shantaram in honour of V. Shantaram, one of the successful Marathi filmmaker.

== Recipients ==
Year	Image	Recipient	Field of Work	Notes	Ref.
2008		Mahesh Kothare	Director, actor, writer	Credited with reshaping Marathi commercial cinema through innovative comedy, horror and fantasy films such as Zapatlela, Pachhadlela & Dhadakebaaz, etc. While introducing new filmmaking technologies to the industry.	
2009		Sachin	Director, actor, singer	Instrumental in shaping Marathi commercial cinema through his work as an actor and director with popular films such as Navri Mile Navryala, Gammat Jammat, Ashi Hi Banwa Banwi & Navra Maza Navsacha, etc.	
2010	–	Smita Talwalkar	Director, actress, producer	Known for giving Marathi cinema strong women-centric narratives through her work as an actor, director and producer, with film such as Chaukat Raja, Savat Mazi Ladki & Tu Tithe Mee.	
2011		Dilip Prabhavalkar	Actor	Acclaimed for bringing remarkable depth and versatility to Marathi cinema through memorable roles in Chaukat Raja, Zapatlela, Pachhadlela and Shevri, etc.	
2012		Reema Lagoo	Actress	Recognised for redefining the portrayal of mothers in Marathi and Hindi cinema such as Aapla Manus, Saatchya Aat Gharat, Sinhasan & Reshamgath.	
2013		Ajay-Atul	Music Director	Widely regarded for giving Marathi cinema a contemporary musical identity through their distinctive compositions such as Natarang, Jogwa, Lai Bhaari & Fandry, etc.	
2014		Sonali Kulkarni	Actress	Known for bringing nuanced and unconventional female characters to Marathi cinema through films such as Doghi, Mukta, Devrai and Deool.	
2015	–	Alka Kubal	Actress	Acclaimed for her portrayal of emotionally grounded women in films such as Maherchi Sadi & Lek Chalali Sasarla.	
2016	–	Arun Nalawade	Actor	Noted for bringing authenticity and emotional depth through grounded character roles in film such as Shwaas.	
2017		Mrinal Kulkarni	Actress, director	Recognised for portraying strong historical and literary women in Marathi cinema such as Shiv Chhatrapati, Rama Madhav, Rajwade & Sons, & Farzand.	
2018		Bharat Jadhav	Actor	A major force behind Marathi commercial cinema’s comic resurgence, with popular performances in Pachhadlela, Jatra, Khabardar and Saade Maade Teen, etc.	
2019		Gajendra Ahire	Director, screenwriter	Known for socially conscious and human-centred storytelling through films such as Not Only Mrs. Raut, Shevri, Anumati, The Silence and Paradh.	
2020		Ravindra Sathe	Singer	Admired for enriching Marathi cinema with his versatile acting and powerful voice.	
2021	Usha_Naik,_Actor_and_Shrihari_Sathe,_Producer_of_the_film_‘EK_HAZARACHI’,_at_a_press_conference,_at_the_45th_International_Film_Festival_of_India_(IFFI-2014),_in_Panaji,_Goa_on_November_29,_2014	Nagraj Manjule	Director, screenwriter, actor	Credited with taking Marathi cinema to the ₹100-crore club milestone with Sairat, while bringing caste, class and social inequality into mainstream Marathi filmmaking.	
2022	–	Digpal Lanjekar	Director, actor	Reviving the historical genre in contemporary Marathi cinema through his ambitious Shri Shivraj Ashtak series.	
2023		Mukta Barve	Actress	A prominent voice in contemporary Marathi cinema, recognised for championing women-centric stories through films such as Double Seat, Mumbai-Pune-Mumbai, Bandishala and Jogwa.	
2024		Prasad Oak	Actor	Distinguished by his versatility as an actor and filmmaker, particularly for bringing historical and socially resonant stories to Marathi cinema through Kachcha Limboo, Hirkani, Chandramukhi and Dharmaveer.	

== See also ==
- Maharashtra State Film Awards
