= Abhanga Tukaram =

2025 Indian Marathi-language film by Digpal Lanjekar

- Directed by: Digpal Lanjekar
- Screenplay by: Digpal Lanjekar
- Story by: Yogesh Soman
- Produced by: Kumar Mangat Pathak; Abhishek Pathak; Ajay Purkar; Digpal Lanjekar
- Starring: Smita Shewale; Yogesh Soman; Ajay Purkar; Sameer Dharmadhikari; Mrinal Kulkarni
- Cinematography: Sandip Shinde
- Edited by: Sagar Shinde; Vinay Shinde
- Music by: Score: Mayur Raut; Songs: Avadhoot Gandhi
- Production companies: Chitrakathee Creations; Dithee Productions
- Distributed by: Panorama Studios
- Release date: 7 November 2025
- Running time: 135 minutes
- Country: India
- Language: Marathi

Abhanga Tukaram is a 2025 Indian Marathi-language historical drama film written and directed by Digpal Lanjekar, known for his earlier series of Marathi historical films known as Shri Shivraj Ashtak. The film chronicles the life, teachings, and literary legacy of Sant Tukaram Maharaj, the 17th-century Marathi saint-poet and key figure of the Bhakti movement in Maharashtra. It stars Yogesh Soman in the titular role, with Smita Shewale, Sameer Dharmadhikari, Mrinal Kulkarni, Ajay Purkar and Ajinkya Raut in pivotal roles. The film was produced by Chitrakathee Creations and Dithee Production, and was released theatrically on 7 November 2025.

The music for the film was composed by Avadhoot Gandhi, built primarily around Tukaram's original abhangas.

== Plot ==
The film follows the life of Sant Tukaram Maharaj (Yogesh Soman), a humble shopkeeper from Dehu, Maharashtra, who transforms into one of the greatest spiritual reformers of 17th-century India. The narrative explores Tukaram's personal hardships, including the loss of his first wife and child and the ensuing poverty, and how these trials deepened his spiritual yearning and devotion to Lord Vitthal.

Central to the story is the unflinching support of his second wife Avali (Smita Shewale), who stands by him despite the social and economic consequences of his devotional vocation. It portrays how Tukaram's abhangas challenged the rigid caste hierarchy of his time, bringing him into conflict with orthodox religious authorities.

A pivotal conflict arises when Brahmin scholars, led by Rameshwar Bhatt (Sameer Dharmadhikari), order Tukaram to destroy his Gatha as it is deemed an infringement of the exclusive rights of the upper-caste clergy over scripture. Tukaram's calm, faith-centred response submerging his writings in the Indrayani River and awaiting divine judgment.

It also intersects the parallel story of Chhatrapati Shivaji Maharaj (Ajinkya Raut), who was a devoted admirer of Tukaram. The narrative shows the resonance between the spiritual courage of the saint and the political valour of the warrior king, reflecting Marathi pride in both figures. Jijabai (Mrinal Kulkarni) also features as a revered historical figure who embodied devotion and resolve.

== Cast ==
- Yogesh Soman as Sant Tukaram
  - Rugved Soman as Young Tukaram
- Smita Shewale as Avali (Jijai), Tukaram's wife
- Ajay Purkar as Mambaji
- Sameer Dharmadhikari as Rameshwar Bhatt, Brahmin scholar antagonist
- Mrinal Kulkarni as Jijabai, Chhatrapati Shivaji Maharaj's mother
- Nikhil Raut as Moropant
- Sachin Bhilare as Pantaji
- Abhijeet Shwetchandra as Lord Vitthal
  - Abheer Gore as young Vitthal
- Virajas Kulkarni as Savji Maharaj
- Ajinkya Raut as Chhatrapati Shivaji Maharaj
- Nupur Daithankar as Rukmini
- Avadhoot Gandhi as Kalokhe Patil
- Sunil Godbole as Rameshwar Bhatt's assistant
- Bipin Surve as Baji Sarjerao
- Tejas Barve as Sant Dnyaneshwar
- Sharvari Joshi Ausekar
- Rudra Kolekar as Mhadya, Tukaram's son
- Ishmita Joshi as Bhagirathi, Tukaram's daughter

== Production ==
Ajay Purkar plays the antagonist in the film, having previously been seen in protagonist roles in Digpal Lanjekar's earlier films. Chinmay Mandlekar, who has been part of Lanjekar's Shri Shivraj Ashtak portraying Chhatrapati Shivaji Maharaj, does not play the role in this film; instead, it is portrayed by Ajinkya Raut, as Lanjekar felt Mandlekar would appear older for the role, considering Shivaji was around 17 years old at the time of his meeting with Tukaram.

== Soundtrack ==
The music was composed by Avadhoot Gandhi, who also appears in the film in the role of Kalokhe Patil. The soundtrack is centred on Sant Tukaram's original abhangas.

No.	Title	Lyrics	Music	Singer(s)	Length
1.	"Aamhi Vaikunthvasi"	Sant Tukaram Maharaj	Avadhoot Gandhi	Avadhoot Gandhi	2:55
2.	"Jethe Jato Tethe"	Sant Tukaram Maharaj	Avadhoot Gandhi	Jaydeep Vaidya, Ajit Vispute, Chandrakant Mane, Nutan Parab, Amita Ghugari, Mukta Joshi, Ishwari Baviskar	2:57
3.	"Anandache Dohi"	Sant Tukaram Maharaj	Avadhoot Gandhi	Bela Shende	3:17
4.	"Rajas Sukumar"	Sant Tukaram Maharaj	Anand Modak	Avadhoot Gandhi	4:33
5.	"Bolava Vitthal"	Sant Tukaram Maharaj	Avadhoot Gandhi	Ajay Purkar, Kedar Joshi, Dnyaneshwar Meshram, Chandrakant Mane	3:33
6.	"Bolava Vitthal – Ajay Purkar Version"	Sant Tukaram Maharaj	Avadhoot Gandhi	Ajay Purkar	3:33
7.	"Dnyaniyancha Raja"	Sant Tukaram Maharaj	Avadhoot Gandhi	Avadhoot Gandhi	3:27
8.	"Ved Anant Bolila"	Sant Tukaram Maharaj	Avadhoot Gandhi	Avadhoot Gandhi	1:56
9.	"Aamhi Jato Amuchya Gava"	Sant Tukaram Maharaj	Avadhoot Gandhi	Avadhoot Gandhi	1:57
10.	"Sundar Te Dhyaan"	Sant Tukaram Maharaj	Avadhoot Gandhi	Avadhoot Gandhi	2:42
Total length:					30:49

== Release and reception ==
Abhanga Tukaram was released theatrically across India on 7 November 2025, distributed by Panorama Studios. The grand music launch was held on 15 October 2025 and was attended by Minister of Cultural Affairs Ashish Shelar, while the official trailer was unveiled on 28 October 2025.

=== Critical response ===
Anub George of The Times of India gave the film 3 out of 5 stars and wrote, "Being based on real life events there are definite issues with pacing but devotees are sure to have a heart warming experience watching their beloved Sant." Santosh Bhingarde of Sakal gave 3.5 out of 5 stars, particularly praising the performances and music, and wrote, "Although the pace of the film is a bit slow and the story does not progress much after the interval, the story of Sant Tukaram's Abhangas is presented in a suitable combination of devotion, faith, religion, spirituality and sacrifice."
