= Dnyaneshwar Mauli =

Marathi-language TV series

- Genre: Spirituality
- Directed by: Digpal Lanjekar
- Starring: See below
- Composer: Bela Shende
- Country of origin: India
- Original language: Marathi
- No. of episodes: 566

Production
- Producer: Chinmay Mandlekar
- Camera setup: Multi-camera
- Running time: 22 minutes

Original release
- Network: Sony Marathi
- Release: 27 September 2021 – 18 June 2023

Dnyaneshwar Mauli is a Marathi-language television series which is airing on Sony Marathi. The show premiered from 27 September 2021 hy replacing Tu Saubhagyawati Ho. Varun Bhagwat played the lead role of Saint Dnyaneshwar.

== Plot ==
The show is the depiction of Saint Dnyaneshwar's life and teachings. From his early childhood to his ‘Samadhi’ which he took at the age of only 21 years.

== Cast ==
- Varun Bhagwat as Sant Dnyaneshwar
- Utkarsh Shinde
- Nandesh Umap
- Titeeksha Tawde
- Avadhoot Gandhi
- Ajay Purkar
- Akshay Waghmare
- Vikram Gaikwad
- Smita Shewale
- Sachin Deshpande
- Anuya Kalaskar
- Purnanand Vandhekar
- Rahul More
- Sahil Dharmadhikari
- Suraj Kalyankar
- Nidhi Rasme
