= Prasad Oak =

Indian actor and director

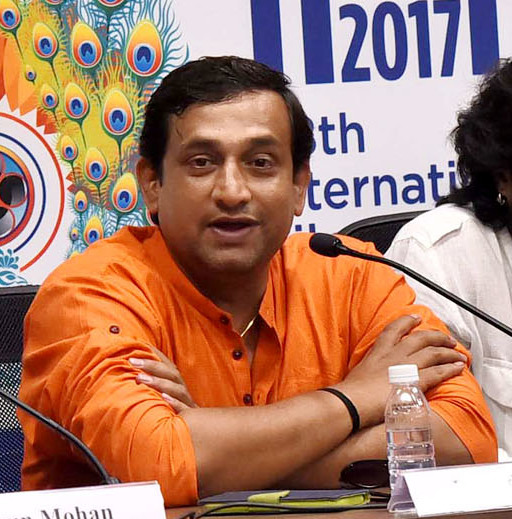
- Prasad in 2017
- Born: 17 February 1975 (age 51); Pune, Maharashtra, India
- Occupations: Actor; director; producer; playback singer
- Years active: 1993–present
- Spouse: Manjiri Oak (m. 1998)
- Children: 2

Prasad Oak (Marathi pronunciation: [pɾəsaːd̪ oːk]; born 17 February 1975) is an Indian actor and film director who works in Marathi films, television and theatre. In a career spanning around three decades, he has received several accolades, including two Filmfare Awards Marathi, two Maharashtra State Film Award and a National Film Award.

Oak began his career in theatre before establishing himself on Marathi television, most notably with the long-running serial Avaghachi Sansar (2006) and won the celebrity edition of the singing competition Sa Re Ga Ma Pa Marathi. He went on to become a prominent film actor, with performances in Tee Ratra (2010), Rama Madhav (2014) and Balkadu (2015), and appeared in commercially successful films including Farzand and Ani... Dr. Kashinath Ghanekar (both 2018), Ye Re Ye Re Paisa 2 (2019) and Dhurala (2020), as well as the critically acclaimed Picasso (2019). His portrayal of Shiv Sena leader Anand Dighe in Dharmaveer (2022) earned him widespread recognition, a role he reprised in its sequel Dharmaveer 2 (2024), both becoming commercial success.

As a director, Oak achieved critical recognition with the drama Kaccha Limbu (2018), which won the National Film Award and Filmfare Award. He subsequently directed Hirkani (2019) and Chandramukhi (2022), both commercial successes, followed by SuSheela SuJeet (2025).

== Early life ==
Prasad Prabhakar Oak was born on 17 February 1975 at Pune, Maharashtra, into a Marathi-speaking family. He was raised in Pune, where he completed his schooling at Bhave High School before graduating from the Brihan Maharashtra College of Commerce (BMCC).

In the late 1990s, he moved to Mumbai to pursue a career in the performing arts, with the ambition of becoming a film director rather than an actor. During his initial years in the city, he experienced financial hardship and was briefly without accommodation, spending several nights sleeping outdoors near Chitra Talkies in Dadar, before being taken in by a relative.

== Career ==
=== Beginnings and television career (1990s–2011) ===
Oak began his career in theatre in the mid-1990s as an assistant director on the Marathi play Premachi Goshta, working alongside the veteran actors Shriram Lagoo and Nilu Phule. He went on to act in several stage productions, including Adhantar, Nandee, Magna Talyakathi, Ranangan, Altun Paltun and Wada Chirebandi.

He made his television debut in Shri Adhikari Brothers' serial Bandini, opposite Mrinal Kulkarni, and drew early notice for his role in Andharyachya Parambya, a serial adapted from the play Barrister. During this period he also took supporting roles in Marathi television serials and films, including Damini, Aabhalmaya and Char Divas Sasuche. In 2004, Oak made his debut as a lead actor in the drama Kunku Lavte Mahercha, opposite Alka Kubal, portraying a wealthy man whose alcoholism and infidelity strain his family. During casting, Kubal was initially reluctant to work with Oak, as he was a newcomer and younger than her, but he remained in the role following discussions with the production team. After the film's release, he appeared in prominent roles in Marathi films such as Kalubaichya Naavan Changbhala (2005), Full 3 Dhamaal, Doghat Tisra Aata Sagala Visara and Ek Daav Dhobi Pachhad (all three released in 2008).

Oak gained wider recognition on television with Avaghachi Sansar, which aired on Zee Marathi in 2006 and became one of the channel's early long-running soap operas. His portrayal of the grey-shaded businessman Harshvardhan Bhosle, opposite Amruta Subhash, made him a household name, and the serial was among the highest-rated shows on Marathi television in 2008. In 2007, he won the celebrity edition of Sa Re Ga Ma Pa Marathi, earning the title Ajinkyatara. He later participated in the comedy skit show Dhinka Chika: Comedycha Navin Formula in 2011 and hosted the counselling-based show Bhanda Saukhya Bhare, presenting more than 1,200 episodes.

=== Transition to film and direction (2012–2016) ===
In 2013, he co-directed, co-produced and acted in the ensemble comedy Hay Kay Nay Kay alongside Pushkar Shrotri under the banner Pops Entertainments; the film was a commercial failure. After the setback, Oak continued his acting career, appearing in Viju Mane's thriller Tee Ratra as a psychiatrist who poses as a serial killer to uncover a woman's hidden past, a performance that earned him the Special Jury Award at the Maharashtra State Film Awards. Over the following years he worked across a range of genres, in films including the critically acclaimed Khel Mandala (2012) and Aamhi Chamakate Taare (2013). He also continued in television, notably the family drama Honar Soon Mi Hya Gharchi from 2013, and made a brief appearance in the Hindi serial Diya Aur Baati Hum.

He played the egoistic Peshwa Raghunath Rao, regent to Madhavrao I, in Mrinal Kulkarni's historical drama Rama Madhav (2014). Reviewing the film for The Indian Express, Namita Nivas described Oak's performance as Raghobadada, stating that he "exudes the perfect angst and hatred towards the system" He next played the antagonist in the political drama Balkadu (2015), loosely based on the ideology of politician Bal Thackeray. Mihir Bhanage of The Times of India remarked, " Oak has a great grip on his villainous role." In Anant Mahadevan's biographical drama Doctor Rakhmabai, he played Sakharam Arjun, the stepfather of Rukhmabai, an eminent physician and social activist. The film was screened at several film festivals but has not had a general release.

=== Critical recognition (2018–2021) ===
Oak returned to direction as sole director with the black-and-white drama Kaccha Limbu (2018), starring Ravi Jadhav, Manmeet Pem and Sonali Kulkarni. Adapted from Jaywant Dalvi's acclaimed novel Runanubandh, the film about a couple raising a child with special needs, marked his critical breakthrough. Nandini Ramnath of Scroll.in wrote, "Oak sensitively handles unthinkable realities of the household", while the reviewer Abhay Salvi praised his decision to cast Jadhav and to shoot much of the film in black and white, writing that "Prasad Oak has hit a six!" The film won the National Film Award for Best Marathi Feature Film and the Filmfare Awards Marathi for Best Film and Best Director. Oak was increasingly cast in prominent film roles. In 2018 he played the spy Bahirji Naik in the historical film Farzand, the first entry in Digpal Lanjekar's Shri Shivraj Ashtak series and the stage actor Prabhakar Panshikar in the biographical drama Ani... Dr. Kashinath Ghanekar.

In 2019 he directed and starred in the period film Hirkani, appearing as Chhatrapati Shivaji Maharaj opposite Sonalee Kulkarni in the title role. Although the film earned ₹14 crore and was a commercial success, critics were less receptive to his direction. Ajay Parchure of Lokmat commented, "Oak has failed to fulfill the expectations raised about this film to a large extent." He received a Filmfare nomination for Best Director and won the MFK Award for Favourite Supporting Actor. He then played a Dashavatari stage actor whose alcoholism and financial struggles threaten his son's ambitions in Picasso, the directorial debut of Abhijeet Mohan Warang. It is the first Marathi film to document Dashavatara, one of the earliest forms of folk theatre in its original format. Reviewing the film, Jaydeep Pathakji of Maharashtra Times felt that "Oak succeeds in expressing the abstract pain of an artist who fills life with countless colours." Before its digital release on Amazon Prime Video in 2021, it premiered at the 10th Jagran Film Festival and the 7th Brahmaputra Valley Film Festival. The same year he had acting roles in Smile Please and Ye Re Ye Re Paisa 2, followed by Dhurala (2020).

=== Established actor and director (2022–present) ===
The year 2022 marked a significant period in Oak's career as both a director and actor. As a director, he helmed Chandramukhi, a musical romance adapted from Vishwas Patil's novel, a project he had sought to adapt for over a decade. Starring Amruta Khanvilkar and Adinath Kothare, the film grossed ₹24 crore in its thetherical run. Shubham Kulkarni of Koimoi described it as Oak's "earnest attempt" and wrote, "He knows which scenes will manipulate emotions and what is to be catered to whom." Oak received several Best Director nominations, including at the Filmfare Marathi Awards and the Fakt Marathi Cine Sanman. As an actor, Oak portrayed Shiv Sena leader Anand Dighe in Pravin Tarde's biographical film Dharmaveer. Reviewing the film for Maharashtra Times, Kalpeshraj Kubal wrote, "Dharmaveer wins half the battle with Prasad Oak's look and his behavior on screen." The film grossed ₹26 crore worldwide and earned him the Filmfare Award Marathi for Best Actor and the Maharashtra State Film Awards for Best Actor. In January 2026, his performance was recognized by the Global Book of Excellence (England) and the India Book of Records for receiving 15 acting awards for a single Marathi film.

He reprised the role of Anand Dighe in the sequel Dharmaveer 2 (2024), and the same year appeared in the period drama Phullwanti as the moneylender Bakhre Savkar Naik. In 2025 he took acting roles in the thriller Jilabi and in the comedy Gulkand.

Oak directed two films in 2025; the first, the suspense drama SuSheela SuJeet, which he also wrote and co-produced, starred Swapnil Joshi and Sonali Kulkarni in the title roles as two strangers thrown together over the course of a few hours; it opened to mixed-to-positive reviews. Both Gulkand and SuSheela SuJeet earned ₹8 crores at the box office becoming the third highest grossing Marathi film of the year. He then directed and played the lead in the family drama Vadapav, portraying a widowed single father who runs a vada pav franchise in London whose intended marriage to a much younger woman complicates his family's relationships. The film received a mixed response from critics and failed commercially.

== Personal life ==
Oak is married to actress and entrepreneur Manjiri Oak, who has also been associated with his directorial ventures The couple have two sons, Sarthak and Mayank. Their younger son, Mayank, made a cameo appearance as Krishna in Oak's directorial film Chandramukhi (2022).

== Filmography ==
Key
†	Denotes projects that have not yet been released

=== Films ===
Year	Title	Actor	Director	Role	Notes	Ref.
2003	Vitthal Vitthal	Yes	No			
2004	Kunku Lavte Mahercha	Yes	No	Shree D. Deshmukh	Lead debut	
2005	Aabhas	Yes	No	Sharad Chitnis		
2005	Zeher	Yes	No	Nihaal	Hindi film	
2005	Kalyug	Yes	No	Anny's uncle	Hindi film	
2005	Kalubaichya Naavan Changbhala	Yes	No	Deepak		
2005	Jay Atharabhuja Saptashrungi Mata	Yes	No	Rahul		
2006	Shambhu Maza Navsacha	Yes	No	Prasad		
2006	Bayo	Yes	No			
2006	Kshan	Yes	No	Vihang Sudhakar Pradhan		
2006	Zakhmi Police 302	Yes	No	Vijay Pawar		
2007	Swapn	Yes	No	Swapnil		
2007	Mi Nahi Tyatla	Yes	No	Prasad		
2007	Balirajache Rajya Yeu De	Yes	No	Kisna		
2008	Full 3 Dhamaal	Yes	No	Rahul Pradhan		
2008	Doghat Tisra Aata Sagala Visara	Yes	No	Samir Rajadhyaksh		
2008	Ek Daav Dhobi Pachhad	Yes	No	Trimbak Joshi		
2008	Ashtarupa Jai Vaibhav Lakshmi Mata	Yes	No	Dr. Sanjay	Television film	
2009	Adi Maaya Adi Shakti	Yes	No	Jaideep		
2009	Hay Kay Nay Kay	Yes	Yes	Prem Pradhan	Co-directed with Pushkar Shrotri; Also producer	
2009	Bandya Ani Baby	Yes	No	Bandya		
2009	Patla Tar Ghya	Yes	No	Shreyas Oak	Also playback snger	
2009	Nirnay	Yes	No			
2010	Kundamauli Malaganga	Yes	No	Prasad		
2010	Tee Ratra	Yes	No	P. Das		
2010	Kas	Yes	No	Sriram Modak		
2010	Jetaa	Yes	No	Sushant Mahashabde		
2010	Navra Avli Baiko Lavli	Yes	No	Banti		
2010	Aika Dajiba	Yes	No	Sharu 's love interest		
2011	Hip Hip Hurray	Yes	No	Kushal		
2011	Pakda Pakdi	Yes	No	Gopal		
2011	Hari Mazhya Ghari	Yes	No	Hari		
2011	2014 Rajkaran	Yes	No	Raj		
2011	Khel Mandala	Yes	No	Sangeet Raje		
2012	Gajrachi Pungi	Yes	No	Director		
2012	Gola Berij	Yes	No	Sonya Baglakar		
2012	Aik	Yes	No	Sandy		
2012	Preet Tujhi Majhi	Yes	No	Namrata's brother		
2012	Aamhi Chamakate Taare	Yes	No	Sameer Mahajan		
2013	Kutha Bolu Naka	Yes	No	Ashutosh		
2013	Vishesh Mhanje Hi Mazi Misses	Yes	No	Siddharth		
2013	Mandali Tumchyasathi Kay Pan	Yes	No	Rakesh		
2013	Mazha Mee	Yes	No	Saurabh		
2013	Dhating Dhingana	Yes	No	Devaa		
2013	Nirmalya	Yes	No			
2014	Rama Madhav	Yes	No	Raghunath Rao		
2014	Headline	Yes	No	Inspector		
2014	Raja Natwarlal	Yes	No	Sub-Inspector Mhatre	Hindi film	
2015	Balkadu	Yes	No	Ram Purkar		
2015	Aga Bai Arechyaa 2	Yes	No	Pralhad Kismise		
2015	Sugar Salt Ani Prem	Yes	No	Ravindra		
2015	Deool Band	Yes	No	Nawadi	Special appearance	
2016	Kanha	Yes	No	Vishwasrao		
2016	Toh Aani Mee Ek Runanubandh	Yes	No	Rohit Vaidya		
2016	7, Roshan Villa	Yes	No	Rajas Javdekar		
2016	Doctor Rakhmabai	Yes	No	Dr. Sarkharam Arjun		
2016	Chiranjeev	Yes	No	Prasad	Special appearance	
2016	Mohar	Yes	No	Nivrutti Bhaledar		
2016	Chahato Mi Tula	Yes	No	Mohan		
2017	22 June	Yes	No	Javed		
2017	Kachcha Limboo	No	Yes			
2018	Satya	Yes	No	Satya		
2018	Shikari	Yes	No	Bharat Leeladhar Bhosle		
2018	Farzand	Yes	No	Bahirji Naik		
2018	Home Sweet Home	Yes	No	Himself	Special appearance	
2018	Ani... Dr. Kashinath Ghanekar	Yes	No	Prabhakar Panshikar		
2019	Smile Please	Yes	No	Shishir Sarang		
2019	Ye Re Ye Re Paisa 2	Yes	No	Inspector Sharad Shinde		
2019	Picasso	Yes	No	Pandurang Gawade		
2019	Hirkani	Yes	Yes	Chhatrapati Shivaji Maharaj		
2020	Dhurala	Yes	No	Harish Gadhwe		
2022	Kaun Pravin Tambe?	Yes	No	Vijay Patil	Hindi film	
2022	Chandramukhi	No	Yes			
2022	Dharmaveer	Yes	No	Anand Dighe		
2023	Alay Mazhya Rashila	Yes	No	Ranjeet		
2024	Blackout	Yes	No	Inspector Patil	Hindi film	
2024	Dharmaveer 2	Yes	No	Anand Dighe		
2024	Aamhi Jarange	Yes	No	Anna Saheb Jawale		
2024	Phullwanti	Yes	No	Bakhre Savkar Naik		
2025	Jilabi	Yes	No	Saurav / Gaurav		
2025	SuSheela SuJeet	Yes	Yes	Nakate	Also producer and playback singer	
2025	Gulkand	Yes	No	Girish Mane		
2025	Mangalashtaka Returns	Yes	No	Sangram		
2025	Vadapav	Yes	Yes	Jaydev Deshmukh		
2025	Reel Star	Yes	No	Sumit		
2026	Deool Band 2	Yes	No	Sripada Sri Vallabha		
2026	Bharat Bhhagya Viddhaata	Yes	No	Kedar Thatte	Hindi film	

=== Television ===
Year	Title	Role	Channel	Notes	Ref.
1993	Bandini		DD Sahyadri		
1995	Gharkul		DD Sahyadri		
1998	Damini		DD Sahyadri		
1998–1999	Pimpalpaan		Alpha TV Marathi		
1998–1999	Andharachya Parambya		Alpha TV Marathi		
2000	Aabhalmaya	Suhas Dani	Alpha TV Marathi		
2002	Char Divas Sasuche	Vivek	ETV Marathi		
2002	The Trap	Vinod Gupte	DD Metro		
2003–2007	Vadalvaat	Bhaskar Chaudhari	Zee Marathi		
2006	Avaghachi Sansar	Harshwardhan Bhosale	Zee Marathi		
2007	Sa Re Ga Ma Pa Marathi	Contestant	Zee Marathi	Winner	
2010–2013	Bhanda Saukhya Bhare	Host	Star Pravah		
2011–2012	Dhinka Chika: Comedycha Navin Formula	Contestant	Star Pravah		
2012	Diya Aur Baati Hum	Jayant Shirke	Star Plus		
2013–2016	Honar Soon Mi Hya Gharchi	Laxmikant Gokhale	Zee Marathi		
2016	Crime Patrol	Ravi Yadav	SET	Episodic role	
2016	Aawaz	Mahatma Jyotirao Phule	Colors Marathi		
2017	Phulpakharu	Anil	Zee Yuva		
2017–2018	Hum To Tere Aashiq Hai	Sangram	Zee Marathi		
2019–present	Maharashtrachi Hasyajatra	Judge	Sony Marathi		

=== Theater ===
- Premachi Goshta (assistant director)
- Bhramacha Bhopala
- Adhantar
- Usna Navra
- Ya Ghar Apalach Ahe
- Lahanapan Dega Deva
- Nandee
- Ranangan
- Altun Paltun
- Wada Chirebandi
- Bechki
- Magna Talyakathi
- Aamcha Private Limited
- Maza Pati Krorepati
- Tu Mhanshil Tasa

== Awards and recognition ==
Awards	Year	Category	Work	Result
City Cine Awards	2023	Best Director	Chandramukhi	Nominated
Fakt Marathi Cine Sanman	2022	Best Actor in a Lead Role	Dharmaveer	Won
Fakt Marathi Cine Sanman	2022	Best Director	Chandramukhi	Nominated
Filmfare Awards Marathi	2018	Best Director	Kachcha Limboo	Won
Filmfare Awards Marathi	2018	Best Debut Director	Kachcha Limboo	Nominated
Filmfare Awards Marathi	2021	Best Director	Hirkani	Nominated
Filmfare Awards Marathi	2023	Best Director	Chandramukhi	Nominated
Filmfare Awards Marathi	2023	Best Actor	Dharmaveer	Won
Filmfare Awards Marathi	2023	Best Actor Critics	Dharmaveer	Nominated
Filmfare Awards Marathi	2025	Best Actor	Dharmaveer 2	Nominated
Filmfare Awards Marathi	2026	Best Actor Critics	Gulkand	Nominated
International Film Festival of India	2017	Best Film	Kachcha Limboo	Nominated
International Film Festival of India	2017	Best Director	Kachcha Limboo	Nominated
Lata Dinanath Mangeshkar Award	2023	Master Dinanath Special Award	Contribution in Field of Film and Drama	Honoured
Maharashtra State Film Awards	2009	Special Jury Award	Tee Ratra	Won
Maharashtra State Film Awards	2022	Best Actor	Dharmaveer	Won
Maharashtra State Film Awards	2026	V. Shantaram Special Contribution Award	Contribution to Marathi Cinema.	Honoured
Maharashtracha Favourite Kon	2019	Favourite Director	Hirkani	Nominated
Maharashtracha Favourite Kon	2019	Favourite Supporting Actor	Hirkani	Won
Maharashtracha Favourite Kon	2021	Favourite Supporting Actor	Hirkani	Nominated
Maharashtracha Favourite Kon	2022	Favourite Director	Chandramukhi	Nominated
Maharashtracha Favourite Kon	2022	Favourite Actor	Dharmaveer	Won
Majja Digital Awards	2023	Outstanding Director	Chandramukhi	Nominated
Majja Digital Awards	2023	Outstanding Actor	Dharmaveer	Won
National Film Awards	2018	Best Marathi Feature Film	Kachcha Limboo	Won
Planet Marathi Film & OTT Awards	2023	Best Director	Chandramukhi	Nominated
Sakal Premier Awards	2023	Best Actor	Dharmaveer	Won
Zee Chitra Gaurav Puraskar	2023	Best Actor	Dharmaveer	Won
Zee Marathi Utsav Natyancha Awards	2004	Best Supporting Character	Vadalvaat	Nominated
Zee Marathi Utsav Natyancha Awards	2007	Best Actor	Avaghachi Sansar	Won
Zee Marathi Utsav Natyancha Awards	2008	Best Actor	Avaghachi Sansar	Won
