= Nikhil Raut =

Indian television actor

- Born: 11 December 1986 (age 39); Pune, Maharashtra
- Occupation: Actor
- Years active: 2002–present
- Spouse: Mayuri Raut (m. 2014)

Nikhil Raut (born 11 December 1986) is an Indian actor known for his work in Marathi television as a theater actor and in Marathi cinema. Raut predominantly working in film and television industry since last 19 years.

== Early life and background ==
Nikhil Raut is from Pune and but staying at Mumbai. He is married to Mayuri Raut since 22 April 2014. Nikhil Raut is studied in Modern High School, Pune. Later, he attended Modern College, Pune.

== Filmography ==
=== Television ===
Show	Role	Channel	Ref.
Chanda Te Banda		ETV Marathi	
Silly Mistakes		Saam TV	
Sujalaam Sufalaam		Saam TV	
Dil Ki Baat		DD National	
Family No.1		DD National	
Hya Gojirwanya Gharat		ETV Marathi	
Raja Shivchhatrapati		Star Pravah	
Abhilasha		Zee Marathi	
Puneri Misal		Saam TV	
Tu Tithe Me	Ashish	Zee Marathi	
Jayostute		Star Pravah	
Crime Diary		ETV Marathi	
Apla Bua Asa Aahe		ETV Marathi	
Asmita		Zee Marathi	
Tu Majha Saangaati		Colors Marathi	
Majhiya Mahera		Colors Marathi	
Kahe Diya Pardes	Vivek (Vicky)	Zee Marathi	
Garja Maharashtra		Sony Marathi	
Success Unlimited	Anchor	Saam TV	
Jagar Mangalagauricha	Anchor	Saam TV	
Jyotibachya Navana Changbhala		Saam TV	
Shri Gurudev Datta		Saam TV	
Thums Up Dhumshan Game Show	Anchor	Zee Marathi	
Good Morning Maharashtra	Anchor	Zee Marathi	
Yeu Kashi Tashi Me Nandayla	Mohit Parab	Zee Marathi	

=== Short film ===
Title	Film Director	Language	Ref.
Anuttarit ( Unanswered)	Pankaj Salunkhe	Marathi	
Who's Next	Abhijit Choudhari	Marathi	
It's Me	Nikhil Raut	Marathi	
Nirnay	Satish Naik	Marathi	
Achman	Vivek Roy	Marathi	

=== Stage ===
Play	Language	Ref.
Gadhvacha Lagna	Marathi	
Sorry Sir	Marathi	
Premachya Gava Jave	Marathi	
Saam Sum	Marathi	
Bayko Palalo Maheri	Marathi	
Savarle Mee	Marathi	
Family Drama	Marathi	
Shevgyachya Shenga	Marathi	
Surkshit Antar Theva	Marathi	
Challenge	Marathi	

=== Feature films ===
Year	Title	Role	Ref(s)
2008	Valu (film)	Ganya	
2008	Tandala		
2008	Aaichi Saath Kari Jagavar Maat		
2010	Mani Mangalsutra		
2012	Bokad		
2012	Zalay Dimag Kharab		
2016	Yala Jeevan Aise Naav		
2016	Page 4		
2018	Farzand	Kisna	
2019	Love Story Majhi Aani Tichi		
2019	Fatteshikast	Kisna	
2019	Who's Next..? The Justice On Its Way	Sameer	
2024	Phullwanti	Bajya	
2025	Abhanga Tukaram	Moropant	
2026	Ranapati Shivray: Swari Agra	Kisna	
