= Ranapati Shivray: Swari Agra =

2026 Indian film by Digpal Lanjekar

- Theatrical release poster
- Directed by: Digpal Lanjekar
- Written by: Digpal Lanjekar
- Produced by: Kumar Mangat Pathak; Abhishek Pathak; Vipul Agrawal; Jenil Parmar; Murlidhar Chhatwani
- Starring: Abhijeet Shwetachandra; Mrinal Kulkarni; Puneet Issar; Ajay Purkar; Sameer Dharmadhikari; Digpal Lanjekar; Prasanna Ketkar; Rishi Saxena
- Cinematography: Sandeep Shinde
- Edited by: Sagar Shinde; Vinay Shinde
- Music by: Avadhoot Gandhi; Mayur Raut
- Production companies: Panorama Studios; Mugafi
- Distributed by: Panorama Studios
- Release date: 6 February 2026
- Running time: 167 minutes
- Country: India
- Language: Marathi

Ranapati Shivray: Swari Agra is a 2026 Indian Marathi-language historical action film written and directed by Digpal Lanjekar. It serves as the sixth installment in the Shri Shivraj Ashtak film series. The film stars Abhijeet Shwetachandra, Mrinal Kulkarni, Puneet Issar, Ajay Purkar, Sameer Dharmadhikari, Digpal Lanjekar, Prasanna Ketkar, Rishi Saxena in lead roles.

The film was theatrically released on 6 February 2026. Despite positive reviews, the film underperformed at the box office

== Cast ==
- Abhijeet Shwetchandra as Chatrapati Shivaji Maharaj
- Mrinal Kulkarni as Rajmata Jijabai
- Puneet Issar as Mirza Raje Jai Singh
- Ajay Purkar as Tanaji Malusare
- Sameer Dharmadhikari as Aurangzeb
- Digpal Lanjekar as Bahirji Naik
- Prasanna Ketkar as Murarbaji Deshpande
- Rishi Saxena as Ram Singh I
- Sachin Deshpande as Kavindra Parmanand
- Amisha Thakur as Zeb-un-Nissa
- Nikhil Raut as Kisna
- Yogesh Soman as Raghunath Pant
- Smita Shewale as Jahanara Begum
- Nupur Daithankar as Soyarabai
- Virajas Kulkarni as Hiroji Farzand
- Amit Deshmukh as Faulad Khan
- Dnyanesh Wadekar as Jafar Khan
- Bipin Surve as Baji Sarjerao
- Abhilash Chaudhary as Aniruddha Singh Ju
- Ayan Karne as Sambhaji
- Akshay Waghmare as Kirat Singh
- Abhyang Kuwalekar as Akhil Khan
- Ashutosh Wadekar as Girdharilal
- Bhushan Shivtare as Prataprao Gujar
- Sanket Oak as Pilaji Shirke

== Release ==
The film was initially slated for release on 19 January 2026, later rescheduled to 30 January 2026, and subsequently postponed to 6 February 2026 due to a clash with Punha Ekda Sade Made Teen and the sudden demise of Ajit Pawar.

The film is available to stream on Amazon Prime Video started from 13 March 2026.

== Reception ==
Komal Khambe of Lokmat gave 3.5 stars out of 5 stars and praised it for its writing, direction, songs, and strong performances, especially Abhijeet Shwetachandra as Shivaji Maharaj, saying that it offers a new thoughtful angle on the Agra incident. However, she noted that viewers expecting heavy action may feel disappointed. Anub George of The Times of India rated 3 stars out of 5 stars and says that although the film has less action and some weak war and crowd scenes, it makes up for it with beautiful sets, costumes and strong visuals, and largely succeeds as a stylish, visually rich retelling of history. Ishaan Zore of Rediff.com, who rated the film 4 stars out of 5 stars, says that the movie is visually and technically strong with powerful songs and action, but it lacks enough raw and realistic historical moments.

Santosh Bhingarde of Sakal rated 3.5 stars out of 5 stars. Reshma Raikwar of Loksatta stated the film has strong performances by all actors, especially Abhijeet Shwetachandra as Shivaji Maharaj, and that the director presents the familiar historical story in a fresh and engaging way while staying true to its core truth. Rasika Shinde-Paul of Kalakruti Media, who rated the film 4/5, said that although some AI-made scenes are visibly artificial and the film is slightly over-emotional, it maintains a good balance of war, strategy and feelings, and is a family-friendly film worth watching in theatres.
