= Ajay Purkar =

Indian actor

- Born: Ajay Ashok Purkar; 16 September 1976 (age 49); Mumbai, Maharashtra, India
- Occupation: Actor
- Notable work: Pawankhind (2022)

Ajay Ashok Purkar is an Indian actor primarily works in Marathi films. He had portrayed the roles of Baji Prabhu Deshpande and Tanaji Malusare in the Shri Shivraj Ashtak film series.

== Filmography ==
=== Film ===
Year	Film	Role	Notes	Ref.
2007	Dhol	Ordinary Goon	Hindi Film Special Appearance/ Cameo Role	
2013	Premachi Goshta	Samit		
2013	Ugly	ACP Godbole	Hindi film	
2014	Sangharsh	Inspector Kalokhe		
2016	Mumbai Time			
2018	Farzand	Motyaji Khalekar		
2018	Mulshi Pattern	Builder Shinde		
2019	Bhai - Vyakti Ki Valli	Pandit Bhimsen Joshi		
2019	Bhai - Vyakti Ki Valli 2	Pandit Bhimsen Joshi		
2019	Bandishala	Advocate Raorane		
2019	Fatteshikast	Subedar Tanaji Malusare		
2021	The Power	Anna	Hindi film	
2021	Collar Bomb	Commander Bhaskar Chandra	Hindi film	
2022	Pawankhind	Baji Prabhu Deshpande		
2022	Sher Shivraj	Tanaji Malusare		
2023	Subhedar	Tanaji Malusare		
2023	Skanda	Rayudu	Telugu film	
2024	Munjya	Balu Kaka	Hindi film	
2024	Amhi Jarange	Annasaheb Patil		
2024	Despatch	Prasad	Hindi film	
2025	Abhanga Tukaram	Mambaji		
2025	Sant Dnyaneshwaranchi Muktai	Changdev		

=== Television ===
Year	Title	Role
2007-2009	Asambhav	Police Inspector Vazalwar
2010	Shubham Karoti	
2012	Tu Tithe Me	
2020	Mulgi Zali Ho	Rajan Deshmukh
2021-2023	Dnyaneshwar Mauli	

=== Web series ===
Year	Title	Role	Language
2020	The Raikar Case	Rajshekhar Apte	Hindi
