= Fatteshikast =

2019 Indian film

- Theatrical release poster
- Directed by: Digpal Lanjekar
- Written by: Digpal Lanjekar
- Produced by: Ajay Arekar; Aniruddha Arekar; Bhausaheb Arekar
- Starring: Chinmay Mandlekar; Mrinal Kulkarni; Harish Dudhade; Ankit Mohan; Sameer Dharmadhikari; Ruchi Savarn; Mrunmayee Deshpande; Trupti Toradmal
- Cinematography: Reshmi Sarkar
- Edited by: Pramod Kahar
- Music by: Devdutta Manisha Baji
- Production company: Almonds Creations
- Distributed by: AA Films
- Release date: 15 November 2019
- Running time: 153 minutes
- Country: India
- Language: Marathi
- Box office: est. ₹5.65 crore (US$590,000)

Fatteshikast (transl. Win by brave efforts) is a 2019 Indian Marathi-language historical drama film directed by Digpal Lanjekar and produced under the banner of Almonds Creations Ajay Arekar and Anirudh Arekar in association with AA Films. The film stars Chinmay Mandlekar, Mrinal Kulkarni, Sameer Dharmadhikari, along with Ankit Mohan and Mrunmayee Deshpande in supporting roles. The music of the film is composed by Devdutta Manisha Baji and the soundtrack includes devotional song of Sant Tukaram. A sequel to Farzand (2018), it is the second film in Lanjekar's Shri Shivraj Ashtak film series in an eight movies series on Maratha Empire. It was followed by the Pawankhind (2022).

== Plot ==
The film depicts the historical encounter between Shivaji I and the subahdar and general of the Mughal army, Shaista Khan at Lal Mahal in Pune.

== Cast ==
- Chinmay Mandlekar as Chatrapati Shivaji Maharaj
- Mrinal Kulkarni as Rajmata Jijabai
- Ajay Purkar as Subhedar Tanaji Malusare
- Sameer Dharmadhikari as Naamdar Khan
- Anup Soni as Shaista Khan
- Rishi Saxena as Fatteh Khan
- Ankit Mohan as Sarsenapati Yesaji Kank
- Mrunmayee Deshpande as Kesar (Phulwanti)
- Vikram Gaikwad as Sardar Chimnaji Mudgal Deshpande
- Nikhil Raut as Kisna
- Prasad Limaye as Sardar Balaji Mudgal Deshpande
- Harish Dudhade as Bahirji Naik (spy)
- Digpal Lanjekar as Sardar Baaji Sarjerao Jedhe
- Akshay Waghmare as Sardar Koyaji Naik Bandal
- Aastad Kale as Kartalab Khan Uzbek
- Trupti Toradmal as Rai Bagan Sahiba
- Ruchi Savarn as Maharani Soyarabai
- Nakshatra Medhekar as Bahubegam (daughter in law of Shaista Khan)
- Ramesh Paradeshi as Amar Singh Rathore
- Ganesh Tidke as Suryaji Malusare

== Production ==
Almonds creations Ajay Arekar & Anirudh Arekar on 30 April 2019.

== Release ==
=== Theatrical ===
Fatteshikast was theatrically released on 15 November 2019.

=== Home media ===
The film is originally available for streaming on ZEE5.

== Box office ==
Fatteshikast had a decent opening at the box office. It reportedly collected around ₹0.65 crore (US$68,000) on first day. The collection rose to ₹1.17 crore (US$120,000) and ₹1.68 crore (US$180,000) on second and third day respectively totalling to ₹3.5 crore (US$370,000) and ₹5.65 crore (US$590,000) in opening week.

== Soundtrack ==
Fatteshikast

Soundtrack album by Devdutta Manisha Baji
- Released: 17 October 2019
- Recorded: 2019
- Studio: Aajivasan Studios
- Genre: Feature film soundtrack
- Length: 37:17
- Language: Marathi
- Label: Zee Music Company

The songs for the film are composed by Devdutta Manisha Baji and lyrics by Sant Tukaram, V. S. Khandekar and Digpal Lanjekar.

Track list
No.	Title	Lyrics	Singer(s)	Length
1.	"Tu Jogawa Wadh Mai" (Chorus singers: Devdutta Manisha Baji, Shantanu Ravindra Pande & Nikhil Modgi)	Digpal Lanjekar	Adarsh Shinde	2:31
2.	"Hechi Yel Deva Naka" (Chorus singers: Ashish Kulkarni, Devdutta Manisha Bsooneraji, Samadhan Vartak, Atharva Kulkarni, Akshay Deshpande, Jeevan Marathe, Homnath Kurkure)	Sant Tukaram	Avadhoot Gandhi and Chorus	3:07
3.	"Akhiyan Yeh Dekho Kanha"	Digpal Lanjekar	Bela Shende	3:16
4.	"Woh Maseeha Aa Gaya"	Digpal Lanjekar	Divya Kumar, Ashish Kulkarni, Devdutta Manisha Baji	5:29
