= Dhai Aakhar =

2024 Indian drama film

- Poster of Dhai Aakhar
- Directed by: Praveen Arora
- Written by: Asghar Wajahat
- Story by: Amrik Singh Deep
- Starring: Mrinal Kulkarni; Harish Khanna (actor); Rohit Kokate; Smriti Mishra
- Cinematography: Sandeep Gn Yadav
- Edited by: V.S. Kannan; Rahul Jaiswal
- Music by: Anupam Roy
- Production companies: Kabir Communications; Aakriti Productions Pvt. Ltd.; S.K. Jain Jamai
- Distributed by: V K Films
- Release dates: November 2023 (IFFI); 22 November 2024
- Running time: 98 minutes
- Country: India
- Language: Hindi

Dhai Aakhar is a Hindi-language family drama film starring Mrinal Kulkarni. It is based on the novel "Teerthatan Ke Baad" by Amrik Singh Deep. Praveen Arora nominated for Best Debut Director at Indian Panorama - Feature Films, Indernational FIlm Festival of India.

== Production ==
The film Dhai Aakhar is produced by Kabir Communications, Aakriti Productions Pvt. Ltd., and S.K. Jain Jamai. It is directed by Praveen Arora, with the screenplay and dialogue written by Asghar Wajahat and the story based on Amrik Singh Deep’s novel. The music for the film is composed by Anupam Roy, with lyrics by Irshad Kamil. The film was shot in various locations across Uttarakhand, including Haridwar, Kankhal, Rishikesh, and Kimsaar. The movie is set to release in theaters on 22 November 2024.

== Synopsis ==
Dhai Aakhar set in the 1980s is based on the novel - "Teerthatan Ke Baad" by Amrik Singh Deep and tells the story of a woman who rebuilds herself after years of being in an abusive marriage when she starts talking to an empathetic writer through letters. The film highlights how abuse is common within patriarchy, so much so it is accepted and normalized within families.

== Cast ==
- Mrinal Kulkarni as Harshita - the protagonist
- Harish Khanna as Sridhar - the writer & lover
- Rohit Kokate as Harshita's husband
- Prasanna Bisht as Bela
- Chandan Anand as Ranjeet
- Smriti Mishra as Sushma
- Neer Raao as Vineet
- Aadya Agrawal as Kanti - Child Artist

== Accolades ==
This film was the official selection in the Indian Panorama and nominated in the competition section of Best Debut Feature Film of a Director, of International Film Festival of India (IFFI) 2023. Dhai Aakhar had its world premiere at the prestigious IFFI 2023 on 25 November 2023. The Film was also the Official Selection at the 21st Chennai International Film Festival (CIFF) 2023, Indian Panorama. The film was screened at the 21st CIFF on 16 December 2023 at PVR Sathyam. This film has won the Special Jury Award at the Cambodia International Film Festival 2024. The film festival is also selected for Tashkent International Film Festival 2024. The film was also officially nominated for the 9th Dehradun International Film Festival 2024.
