= AB LLB =

- Written by: Sami Khan
- Story by: Sami Khan
- Directed by: Sami Khan
- Starring: Sameer Dharmadhikari; Rakesh Bedi; Sami Khan; Shubhangi Latkar
- Country of origin: India
- Original language: Hindi

Production
- Producer: Cineflix Films Productions
- Production company: CineFlix Films Productions

Original release
- Network: MX Player
- Release: 30 April 2023

AB LLB-Iski to degree hi ulti hai is an Indian web series released on 30 April, 2023 on MX Player.

== Production ==
Produced by Cineflix Films production and directed by Sami Khan with the story, screenplay, and dialogue also written by Sami Khan. music by Ravi Raj Koltharkar, lyrics by Sami Khan, and a background score by Raviraj Koltharkar. The executive producers of the series are Milan Desai and Shaziya Khan, with cinematography by Chandrashekhar Nagarkar, editing by Shailesh Darekar, costumes by Milan Desai, and action by Prashant Naik. The series released on MX Player on 30 April 2023. The shooting for the web series was completed in Chiplun, Maharashtra.

== Cast ==
- Sameer Dharmadhikari as Sudama
- Rakesh Bedi as Shri Durgesh Nir ( Me Too Judge )
- Sami Khan as Bablu ( Actor & advocate )
- Shubhangi Latkar as Judge Nadkarni
- Sanjay Khapare as Pushkar Rao
- Sandhya Manik as Zaara
- Rajesh Durge as Producer Jayanti Bhai
- Apoorva Sapkal as Avni]
- Rahul Kulkarni as David
- Amit Lekhwani as Jaiveer
- Amit Shirvastav as Adv Shinde
- Divya Sharma as Saalmi]
- Veena Shirke as Mrs Shinde
- Vaishali Jhadhav as Dhaarmi
- Sakshi Pande as Shivannya
- Manish Wankar as Abhay
- Kalpana Bandekar as Budhi Aurat
- Harshada Patil as Me to Victim actress
- Rehman Memon as Anuj
- Saloni Surve as Ragini
- Shashikant Khanvilkar as Abbu
