= Pawankhind =

2022 Indian film by Digpal Lanjekar

- Theatrical release poster
- Directed by: Digpal Lanjekar
- Written by: Digpal Lanjekar
- Produced by: Ajay Arekar; Aniruddha Arekar; Bhausaheb Arekar
- Starring: Chinmay Mandlekar; Mrinal Kulkarni; Ajay Purkar; Ankit Mohan; Sameer Dharmadhikari; Ruchi Savarn; Prajakta Mali
- Cinematography: Amol Gole
- Edited by: Pramod Kahar
- Music by: Devdutta Manisha Baji
- Production company: Almonds Creations
- Distributed by: AA Films
- Release date: 18 February 2022 (India)
- Running time: 153 minutes
- Country: India
- Language: Marathi
- Box office: est.₹75 crore

Pawankhind (/pɑːvʌnxɪnd/ PAAVANKHIND) is a 2022 Indian Marathi-language historical action drama film directed by Digpal Lanjekar and produced under the banner of Almonds Creations in association with AA Films. The film based on the life of Maratha warrior, Baji Prabhu Deshpande, stars Chinmay Mandlekar, Mrinal Kulkarni, Ajay Purkar, Sameer Dharmadhikari, along with Ankit Mohan, Prajakta Mali and Kshitee Jog in supporting roles.

The film grossed ₹75 crore (US$7.9 million) in box office receipts becoming the fifth highest-grossing Marathi film of all time and second highest-grossing Marathi film of 2022.

== Synopsis ==
The film depicts the historical rearguard last stand that took place in 1660 at a mountain pass in the vicinity of fort Vishalgad, near the city of Kolhapur, Maharashtra, India between the Maratha general Baji Prabhu Deshpande and Siddi Masud of the Adilshah Sultanate, known as Battle of Pavan Khind.

== Plot ==
The film begins in 1674 with the Shivaji Maharaj I telling story of Battle of Pavan Khind to Sambhaji Maharaj. The plot frequently switches flashback to 1660.

Badi Begum asks everyone in the court, ‘’Who would dare to kill Shivaji?’’ with Siddi Johar responding, "I dare to kill Shivaji". Badi Begum gives him a chance to prove himself on one condition that if he killed Shivaji I she would give him a post in Bijapur Sultanate and should he fail in killing Shivaji Maharaj, she would kill him.

At that time Chhatrapati Shivaji Maharaj was encamped at Panhala fort with his forces. Siddi Johar's army besieged the fort of Panhala and cut off the supply of routes to the fort. During the bombardment of Panhala, Siddi Johar purchased grenades from the English at Rajapur and hired some English personalities in their force.

Chatrapati Shivaji Maharaj gave order to Bahirji Naik (Harish Dudhade) to search a secret road of Vishalgad in order to escape. Bahirji found the road and Shivaji maharaj escaped from Panhala by cover of night but here they create a Shivaji's look alike Shiva Kashid (Ajinkya Nanaware), a barber by profession sending him for the meeting with Siddi Johar. Shiva Kashid went to Siddi Johar but when Fazal Khan recognized him, Siddi killed Shiva Kashid.

Here Adilshah's army was in pursuit with an army of 10,000. Then, Shivaji I decided to split his forces. Baji Prabhu Deshpande agreed to face Adilshah's troops with 300 soldiers. Shivaji maharaj told him that he would hear cannons being fired 5 times, signaling Shivaji's safety.

Baji Prabhu occupied Ghodkhind, blocking the path of Adilshah troops. His brother, Fulaji, Rayaji Bandal, Shambusingh Jadhav, Aginya were present with him. Fulaji, Aginya, Rayaji and Shambusingh were killed after fierce fight. Baji Prabhu were wounded but carried on fighting at Ghodkhind. Five hours after starting the battle, the cannons were fired announcing that Shivaji safely returned to Vishalgad.

The plot frequently switches to 1674. Shivaji Maharaj renamed Ghodkhind to Pawankind in honour of the sacrifices of the 300 Maratha troops.

== Cast ==
- Chinmay Mandlekar as Chhatrapati Shivaji Maharaj
- Mrinal Kulkarni as Rajmata Jijabai
- Ajay Purkar as Baji Prabhu Deshpande
- Ruchi Savarn as Matoshri Soyarabai
- Prajakta Mali as Shrimant Bhavanibai Bandal
- Surabhi Bhave as Matoshri Sonai Deshpande
- Kshitee Jog as Badi Begum.
- Madhavi Nimkar as Matoshri Gautamai Deshpande
- Sameer Dharmadhikari as Siddi Johar
- Ujjwala Jog as Bajiprabhu's mother Bayobai Deshpande
- Astad Kale as Siddi Masud
- Rishi Saxena as Rustam Zaman
- Sushrut Mankani as Fazar Khan
- Ankit Mohan as Rayajirao Bandal
- Dipti Ketkar as Dipaiaau Bandal
- Harish Dudhade as Bahirji Naik
- Akshay Waghmare as Koyaji Bandal
- Ajinkya Nanaware as Narvir Shiva Kashid
- Bipin Surve as Shambu Singh Jadhavrao
- Kunaal Dhumal as Sarjerao Jedhe
- Vaibhav Mangle as Gangadharpant
- Sunil Jadhav as Fulajiprabhu Deshpande
- Sachin Bhilare as Aaginya
- Vikram Gaikwad as Netaji Palkar
- Shivraj Waichal as Harpya
- Rajan Bhise as Kanhoji Jedhe
- Santosh Juvekar as Guest appearance in song "Raja Ala Raja Ala"

== Production ==
In December 2019 after Farzand and Fatteshikast, Digpal Lanjekar announced a new film Jungjauhar, his third film on unsung Maratha heroes.

On 11 February 2020, principal photography took place in Raigad Fort, Maharashtra. Filming was completed on 19 March 2020. In February 2021 makers renamed Jungjauhar to Pawankhind.

== Soundtrack ==
Pawankhind

Soundtrack album by Devdutta Manisha Baji
- Released: 5 March 2022
- Recorded: 2021
- Genre: Feature film soundtrack
- Length: 15:13
- Language: Marathi
- Label: Everest Entertainment

Devdutta Manisha Baji chronology
Fatteshikast (2019)	Pawankhind (2022)	Sher Shivraj (2022)

Official audio
- Pawankhind - Full Album on YouTube

Soundtrack of the film is composed by Devdutta Manisha Baji and lyrics written by Digpal Lanjekar. Video of track "Yugat Mandli" sung by Haridas Shinde, Avadhoot Gandhi was released in December 2021.

Track listing
No.	Title	Singer(s)	Length
1.	"Yugat Mandli"	Avadhoot Gandhi, Haridas Shinde	4:21
2.	"Raja Aala"	Avadhoot Gupte	4:21
3.	"Shwasat Raja Dhyasat Raja"	Devdutta Manisha Baji	2:08
4.	"Rani Nighta Shuur"	Devdutta Manisha Baji	4:23
Total length:			15:13

== Release ==
=== Theatrical ===
Pawankhind was originally scheduled to release on 10 June 2021, but was postponed due to the COVID-19 pandemic. The second release date 31 December 2021, but the release was again delayed due to the increasing number of COVID-19 cases, fuelled by the SARS-CoV-2 Omicron variant. The film was released on 18 February 2022.

=== Home media ===
The film was released digitally streamed on Amazon Prime Video from 20 March 2022.

== Reception ==
=== Box office ===
Pawankhind collected ₹10 crore in the opening week of its release.

As of 19 March 2022 the film has grossed ₹16.71 crore. The film ended its theatrical run with a worldwide gross of ₹43–₹75 crore (US$7.9 million).

=== Critical response ===
Pawankhind received positive critical reviews. Mihir Bhanage from The Times of India gave 3.5 stars (out of 5), saying that "Pawankhind excels in storytelling, the technical aspects, though good, could have been better. The background score overpowers dialogues in some important scenes, and the action choreography in some scenes fails to make the cut. However, all said and done, the entire team has done its best to make this a big screen experience. Maybe with a bigger budget, these things can be ironed out in the following films of Lanjekar's series." Shriram Iyengar from Cinestaan.com wrote that "Of course, the drama is heightened. It is important to remember that the film feels coloured by a majoritarian bias. Yet, that was always the style of folk dramatists. They could change the tone to suit the audience. Cinema can claim to be no different. There are moments in the final action sequence when the VFX glitches are visible, but they do not hinder the story in any way." Kalpesh Kubal from Maharashtra Times wrote that "The technical side seems to have faltered somewhat; But that can be ignored. Throughout the story of the film, the director has tried to underline various knights." Lokmat wrote "hard work of the director and the actors can be seen on the screen. To experience an unprecedented history, you must visit this movie theater and watch it at least once."
