= Battle of Pavan Khind =

1660 battle between Maratha and Bijapur in India

Coordinates: 16°52′N 73°50′E

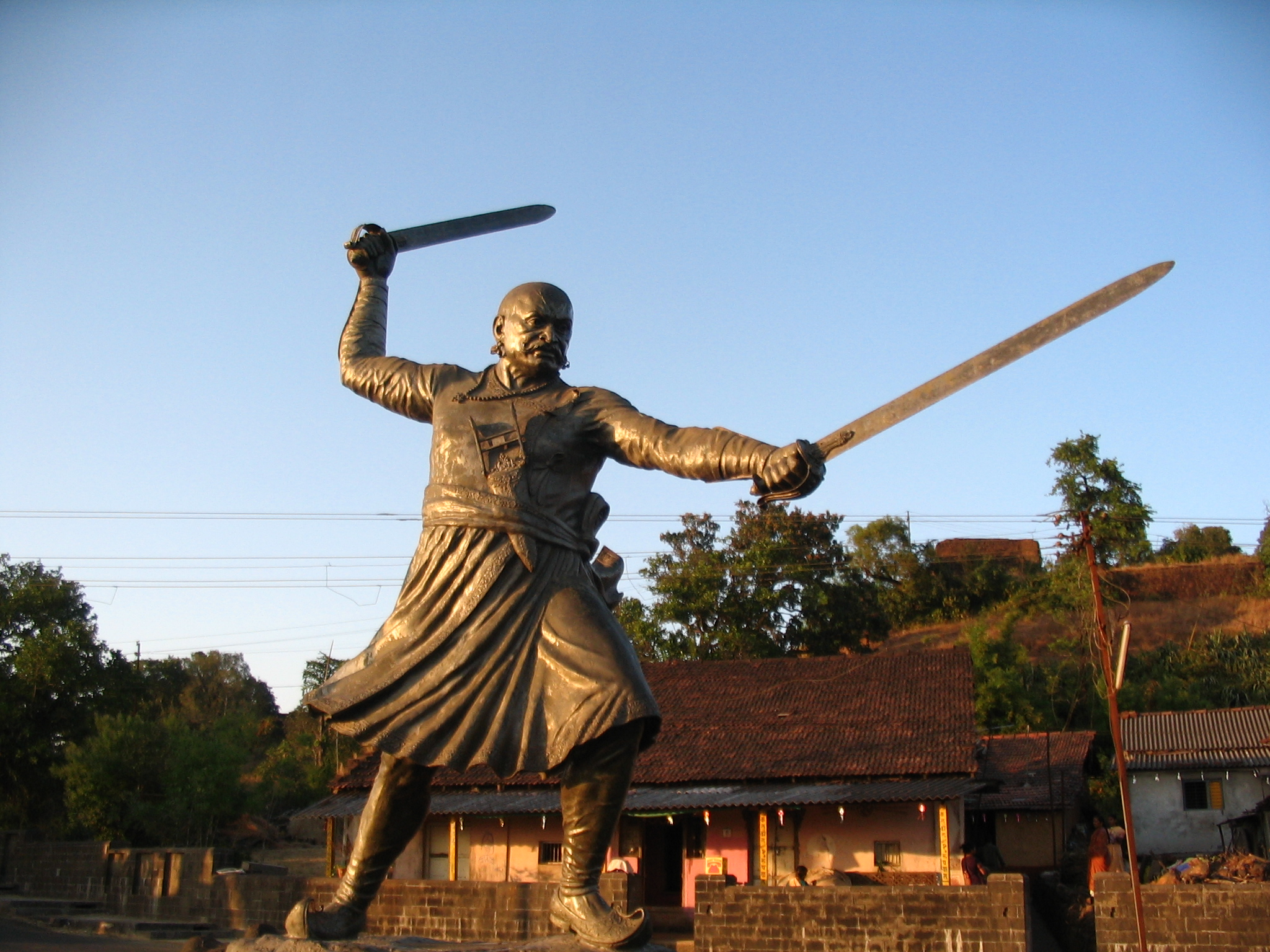
- Statue of Baji Prabhu Deshpande in Panhala Fort
Date	1660
Location	Pavan Khind, Vishalgad, Maharashtra, India
Result	Bijapur victory

Belligerents
Maratha Empire	Bijapur Sultanate

Commanders and leaders
Baji Prabhu Deshpande †; Fulaji Prabhu Deshpande †; Rayaji Bandal †; Shambu Singh Jadhav †	Siddi Masud; Fazl Khan

Strength
5,000	Unknown

Casualties and losses
700	Unknown

The Battle of Pavan Khind (/pɑːvʌnxɪnd/ PAAVANKHIND) was a rearguard last stand that took place in September 1660, at a mountain pass in the vicinity of Vishalgad between the forces of the Maratha and the pursuing Bijapur Sultanate forces.

== Background ==
Shivaji, besieged in Panhala fort by Siddi Jauhar, sent a deceitful letter begging for protection and proposing an alliance. Jauhar agreed to the proposal. He granted Shivaji a safe conduct and assured him of support, hoping to build his own independent kingdom with Shivaji’s help. The next day, Shivaji visited Jauhar at midnight with just a few followers. After exchanging oaths of cooperation, Shivaji quickly returned to the fort, and the fake siege continued. When Ali Adil Shah II learned of Jauhar’s secret dealings with Shivaji, he was furious. He left his capital on 5 August 1660 to punish both rebels. An envoy failed to bring Jauhar back in line. As Ali Adil Shah’s army advanced towards Panhala, Shivaji quietly escaped one night with his family and 5,000–6,000 soldiers. Panhala fell back into Adil Shah’s hands without a fight around 25 August 1660.

== Battle ==
After escaping the Siege of Panhala, Shivaji and his small accompaniment were pursued by Siddi Masud and Fazl Khan of the Bijapur Sultanate with a much larger force. As they reached a narrow ravine, Shivaji made the strategic decision to leave Baji Prabhu Deshpande and 5,000 men behind with a heavy mandate: hold the pass at all costs until the cannons of Vishalgarh signaled his safety. What followed were three brutal, bloody assaults by the Bijapuris, yet the rearguard held their ground, repelling every wave. The signal eventually came, confirming Shivaji was safely within the fort's walls. The heroic Baji Prabhu was mortally wounded, later died with 700 Marathas. The engagement ended with the destruction of the Maratha forces, and a tactical victory for the Bijapur Sultanate but failed to capture Shivaji.

== Aftermath ==
The Bijapuris declined to besiege Vishalgarh, and retired to their own territory, after recovering Pavangarh and some other forts in addition to Panhala.

== In popular culture ==
- The battle was depicted in episodes of Raja Shivchatrapati
- In 2022, Pawankhind, a Marathi-language film depicting the battle directed by Digpal Lanjekar and starring Chinmay Mandlekar as Shivaji and Ajay Purkar as Baji Prabhu Deshpande was released on 21 January.
- Also in 2022, Har Har Mahadev, another Marathi-language film depicting the prior siege and the battle directed by Abhijeet Deshpande and starring Subodh Bhave as Shivaji and Sharad Kelkar as Baji Prabhu Deshpande was released on 25 October.

== See also ==
- Battle of Kolhapur
- Third Battle of Panipat
- List of last stands
