= Saam TV =

Indian Marathi language news channel

- Country: India
- Headquarters: Mumbai, Maharashtra, India

Programming
- Language: Marathi
- Picture format: 576i (SDTV)

Ownership
- Owner: Sakal Media Group
- Sister channels: Kolkata TV; News7 Tamil

History
- Launched: 15 August 2008; 17 years ago

Links
- Website: www.saamtv.com

Saam TV is the Sakal Media Groups's first venture into broadcast media business and today one of the leading news channels in Maharashtra. Dr Nilesh Khare is the Chief Editor— Multimedia Content for Sakal Media Group and COO of Saam TV, he leads editorial strategy and oversees operational management.

== Current broadcast ==
No.	Show	Producer
01	VIRAL SATYA	Sandeep Chavhan-Shivaji Shide
02	BATMICHA 7-12	Mayuresh Kadav
03	SAAM UPDATE	Siddhesh Sawant
04	Agrowon	Farha Khan
05	ETHE NOKARI MILEL	Ashwarya P
06	MEGA PRIME TIME	Santosh Thale
07	AAJ DINANK	Durgesh Sonar
08	SPOTLIGHT	Aniket Pendase
09	36 JILHE 36 REPORTER	
10	SARKARNAMA 360	Mayuresh Kadav
11	Top 50 News	Priyanka Garad
