= Tu Tithe Me =

Indian Marathi show

- Genre: Drama
- Written by: Chinmay Mandlekar
- Starring: See below
- Country of origin: India
- Original language: Marathi
- No. of seasons: 2
- No. of episodes: 670

Production
- Producer: Shashank Solanki
- Production locations: Mumbai, Maharashtra
- Camera setup: Multi-camera
- Running time: 22 minutes

Original release
- Network: Zee Marathi
- Release: 16 April 2012 – 17 May 2014

Tu Tithe Me is an Indian television series that aired on Zee Marathi which is produced by Shashank Solanki. The series premiered on 16 April 2012 from Monday to Saturday at 7 pm by replacing Arundhati.

== Summary ==
It is a story about difficulties of married life. Manjiri and Satyajeet face a lot of ups and downs in their love life. The way they tackle through all of the problems is the main twist.

== Cast ==
=== Main ===
- Chinmay Mandlekar as Satyajeet Mudholkar
- Mrunal Dusanis as Manjiri Pruthviraj Sarnaik / Manjiri Satyajeet Mudholkar
- Priya Marathe as Priya Mohite

=== Recurring ===
Satya's family

- Vandana Sardesai-Waknis as Shalini Mudholkar
- Neha Shitole as Netra Gaurang Mudholkar
- Amol Shirole as Gaurang Mudholkar
- Rajshri Nikam as Charulata Mudholkar
- Sheetal Shukla as Aaji

Manjiri's family

- Ramesh Bhatkar as Pruthviraj Sarnaik
- Vidya Karanjikar as Kishori Pruthviraj Sarnaik
- Ajay Purkar as Shivraj Sarnaik
- Sharvani Pillai as Ankita Sarnaik
- Nehanki Sankhye as Madhura Sarnaik/Madhura vihang Bhosale(dead)

Others

- Angad Mhaskar as Vihang Bhosale
- Milind Shinde as Dada Holkar
- Shreya Bugade as Manjusha Holkar (Dada holakar's ex-wife)/ Manjusha Vihang Bhosale (vihang's 2nd wife)
- Nikhil Raut as Ashish
- Amol Kolhe as Swapnil Wadekar
- Kshitee Jog
- Pratibha Goregaonkar

== Awards ==
Zee Marathi Utsav Natyancha Awards
Year	Category	Recipient	Role	Ref.
2012	Best Daughter-in-law	Mrunal Dusanis	Manjiri Mudholkar	
2012	Best Villain	Priya Marathe	Priya Mohite	
2012	Best Actor	Chinmay Mandlekar	Satyajeet Mudholkar	
2012	Best Actress	Mrunal Dusanis	Manjiri Mudholkar	
2013	Best Character Male	Chinmay Mandlekar	Satyajeet Mudholkar	
2013	Best Daughter-in-law	Mrunal Dusanis	Manjiri Mudholkar	
2013	Best Villain Male	Milind Shinde	Dada Holkar	
