= Tu Majha Saangaati =

2014 Marathi language historical series

- Genre: Historical drama
- Written by: Shirish Latkar
- Directed by: Raghunandan Barve; Sachin Gokhale
- Starring: See below
- Theme music composer: Devaki Pandit; Suresh Wadkar
- Country of origin: India
- Original language: Marathi
- No. of seasons: 2
- No. of episodes: 1299

Production
- Producer: Sangeet Kulkarni
- Production location: Mumbai
- Camera setup: Multi-camera
- Running time: 22 minutes

Original release
- Network: Colors Marathi
- Release: 11 July 2014 – 11 August 2018

Tu Majha Saangaati (transl. You are my Companion) is an Indian Marathi language TV series which aired on Colors Marathi. It premiered from 11 July 2014 and ended on 11 August 2018 completing 1299 episodes. It starred Chinmay Mandlekar in the lead role of Saint Tukaram.

== Plot ==
The story is entirely based on the life of saint Tukaram and his wife Aavli. The first wife of Tukaram dies in child-birth. A heart-broken Tukaram is busy taking care of his children. Tukaram’s parents constantly ask him to get married a second time, but he refuses. Aavli is a vivacious small girl with full of life and joy. However, tradition forces her into a limited domestic life at her parents' house. The series tracks her transition from a young girl quick to anger to a mature and tolerant responsible woman. When Tukaram finally agrees to a second marriage, Aavli is the bride of choice. The series is an intriguing account of these two people coming together.

== Cast ==
- Chinmay Mandlekar as Saint Tukaram
- Mrunmayee Supal as child Aavli
  - Rujuta Deshmukh as young Aavli
    - Pramiti Narke as elder Aavli
- Shreevallabh Bhatt as Vaman
- Mangesh Desai as Goroba
- Apurva Nemlekar as Soyra
- Saurabh Gokhale as Saint Dnyaneshwar
- Shekhar Phadke as Vitthalpant
- Rutuja Bagwe as Rakhma

== Reception ==
=== Ratings ===
Week	Year	BARC Viewership		Ref.
Week	Year	TRP	Rank	Ref.
Week 22	2016	1.4	5	
Week 23	2016	1.6	4	
Week 24	2016	1.8	2	
Week 34	2016	2.2	5	
Week 35	2016	2.0	4	
