= Siddi Masud =

General in the Adilshahi sultanate

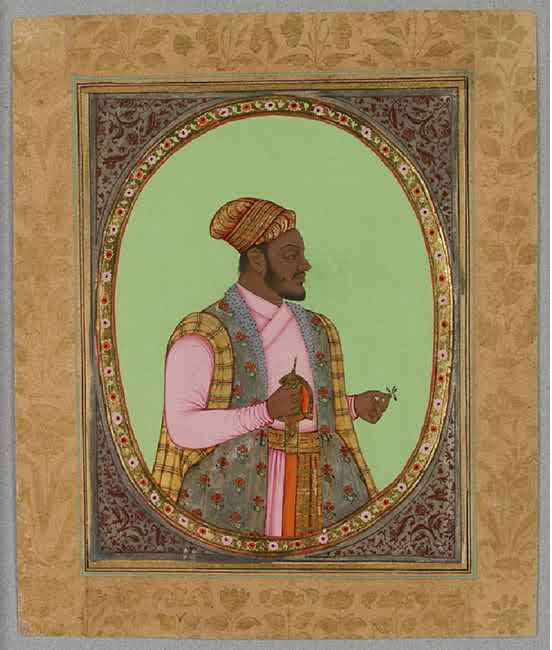
- portrait of Siddi Masud c. 17th century
- Born: 17th century
- Military career
- Allegiance: Bijapur Sultanate later: Golconda Sultanate; Maratha Empire
- Rank: Wazir
- Conflicts: Battle of Pavan Khind

Siddi Masud or Siddi Masood was a general in the Adilshahi sultanate and he was the son-in-law of famous general Siddi Jauhar. He went on to become the Wazir of Bijapur Sultanate during Sikandar Adil Shah's reign.

== Early life and Siege of Panhala ==
Not much is known about his early life. He was the son in law of Siddi Jauhar. He was present at the siege of Panhalgad by Siddi Jauhar. He led the pursuing Adilshahi forces against the Maratha rearguard led by Baji Prabhu Deshpande and Bandal Sena in the Battle of Pavan Khind. Later on he was defeated by Marathas at the base of Vishalgadh and retreated to safer location.

== Later life and Promotion as a Wazir ==
He rose through the ranks in a tumultuous period in a weak Adilshahi's reign. He was the leader of the Deccan faction in the Adilshahi court against the Pathani faction led Bahlolkhan. He was able to subdue his Pathani rivals even though the internal feuds went on. He rose to the position of Wazir sometime around 1676 acting as a regent for the young Sikandar Adilshah. In the 1678, he allied with Chhatrapati Shivaji and Qutub Shah against the Mughals. Not much is known about his later life and death. Adilshahi later on died in 1686.

== In popular culture ==
=== Films and television ===
- In the 2022 Marathi-language Indian historical film Pawankhind, he is portrayed by Astad Kale.
