= Baji Prabhu Deshpande =

Maratha general of 17th century

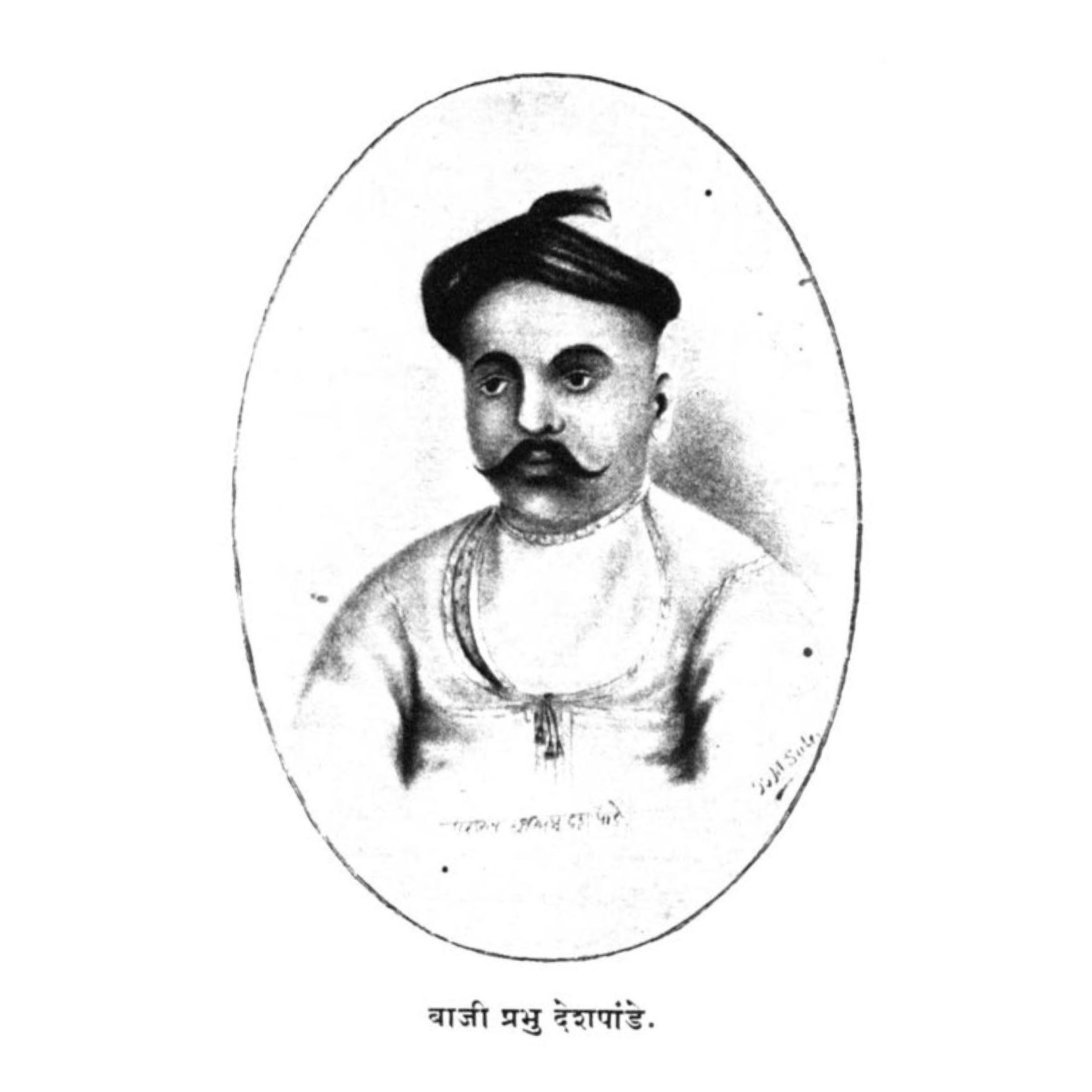
- Posthumous sketch of Baji Prabhu Deshpande
- Born: c. 1615; Shind, Ahmadnagar Sultanate (modern day Pune district, Maharashtra, India)
- Died: 1660 (aged 44–45); Ghod Khind, Bijapur, Mughal Empire (modern day Pavan Khind, Kolhapur district, Maharashtra, India)
- Known for: Battle of Pavan Khind

Baji Prabhu Deshpande (c. 1615 – 1660) was a general of the Maratha army. He is known for his role in the Battle of Pavan Khind, where he sacrificed his life defending Shivaji from Siddi Jauhar's Bijapur forces. He also was a landlord or Vatandar in the Maval region.

== Early life ==
Baji Prabhu was born around 1615 in a Chandraseniya Kayastha Prabhu family. Earlier he worked under Krishnaji Bandal of Rohida near Bhor. After Shivaji defeated Krishnaji at Rohida and captured the Rohida fort, many commanders including Baji Prabhu joined Shivaji.

== Battle of Pavan Khind ==
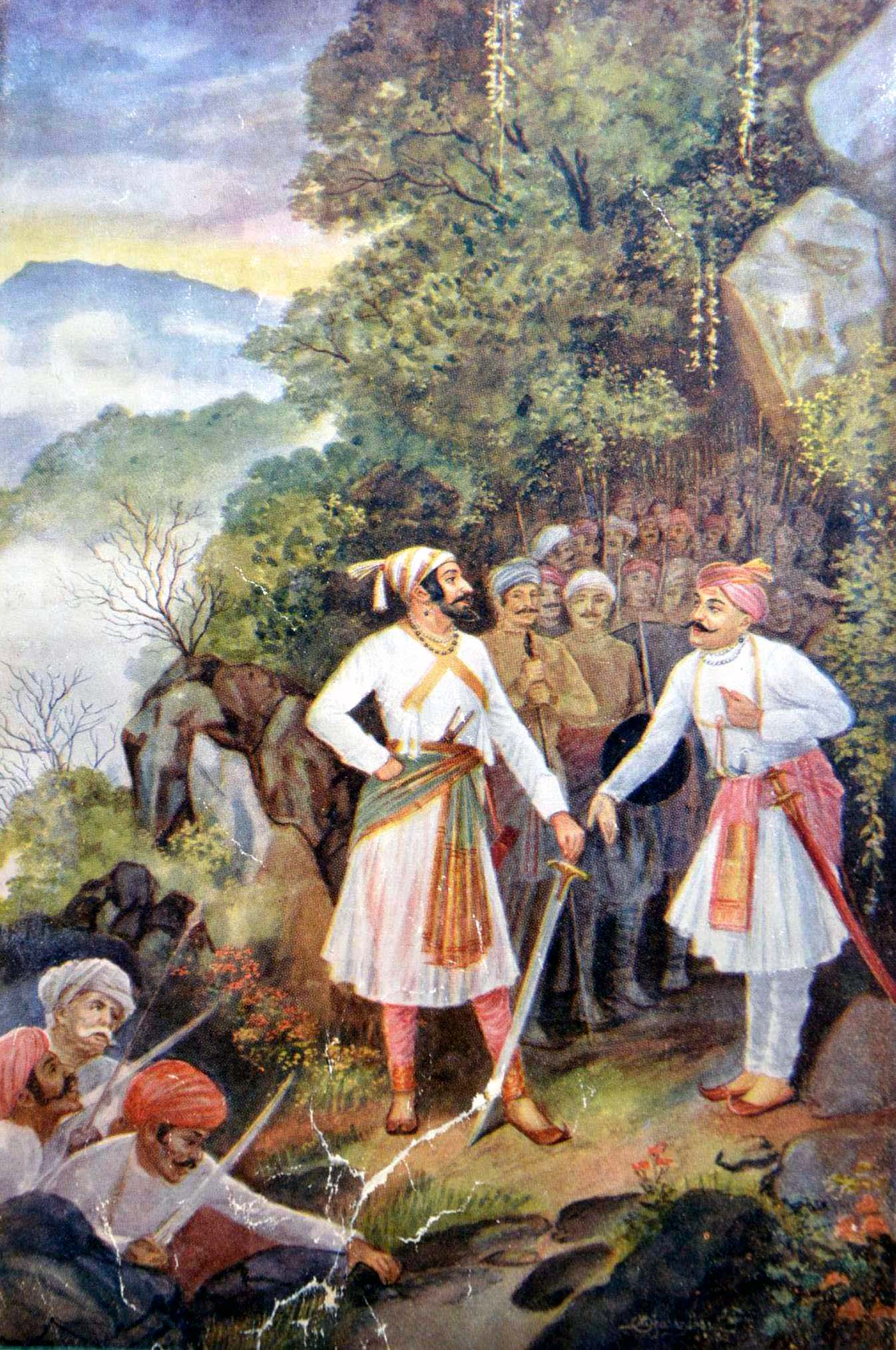
A 20th century depiction of Baji Prabhu with Shivaji at Pavan Khind by M. V. Dhurandhar.

After defeating Afzal Khan and routing the Sultanate of Bijapur army at Pratapgad, Shivaji continued to push into the Bijapur territory. Within a few days, the Marathas captured Panhala. Meanwhile, another Maratha force, led by Netaji Palkar, pushed towards Bijapur. Bijapur forces repulsed this attack, forcing Shivaji, some of his commanders and soldiers to retreat to Panhala fort.

The Bijapur troops were led by Siddi Jauhar, an Abyssinian general. Discovering Shivaji's location, Jauhar laid Siege of Panhala. Netaji Palkar made repeated attempts to break the siege from outside, but these failed.

A risky plan was then put into action: Shivaji, Baji Prabhu Deshpande with a select band of troops would attempt to break through the siege at the night, and make for Vishalgad. In order to deceive the Bijapur forces, to avoid a chase if they found out that Shivaji had broken the siege, Shiva Kashid a barber by profession, had physical resemblance to Shivaji, volunteered to dress like the king and let himself be captured.

At night, Shivaji, broke through the siege. They were pursued by the Bijapur force. As planned, Shiva Kashid allowed himself to be captured and taken back to the Bijapur camp, guessing that he would be put to death once the charade was discovered. This gave the fleeing Maratha force some breathing space.

As soon as the Bijapur force realized their mistake, the chase was on again, led by Siddi Masud, the son-in-law of Siddi Jauhar. Near the pass of Ghodkhind (Horse's Pass), the Marathas made a final stand. Shivaji and half of the Maratha force pushed for Vishalgad, while Baji Prabhu, his brother Phulaji and the remaining Bandal Sena of a few hundred men blocked the pass and fought off the pursuing Bijapur soldiers for more than 18 hours.

Through the battle, Baji Prabhu, continued fighting though grievously injured, inspiring his men to fight on until Shivaji's safe journey to Vishalgad was signaled by the firing cannons.

The Ghod Khind pass was subsequently named Pavan Khind ("Holy Pass") by Shivaji, in honor of the sacrifice of Baji Prabhu and his troops.

== Descendants ==
Baji Prabhu Deshpande was born in Bhor, Maharashtra.

Vishnu Narayan Deshpande, the 10th descendant and former Sarapanch of Parhar Budruk, was a freedom fighter. His wife Latika Deshpande was a relative of the author Ram Ganesh Gadkari. The family has a relationship with the family of Rango Bapuji Gupte. Vishnu Narayan Deshpande had four sons and four daughters. His son Dilip Deshpande helped people displaced by dam building, and farming is their family business. The family conducts social work and is aware of the legacy of Baji Prabhu.

One of Baji Prabhu Despande's descendants, Ramchandra Kashinath Deshpande, was an Indian freedom fighter against the British Raj, an educationalist and a social activist who worked in Dhule and Jalgaon. He participated in the Quit India Movement during the British Raj and was imprisoned for 19 months in the Kolhapur Central Jail. He was congratulated after Independence by the then Prime Minister of India Indira Gandhi. For his social work, he was given the title of 'Special Executive Magistrate' by Government of Maharashtra in 1989.

== In popular culture ==
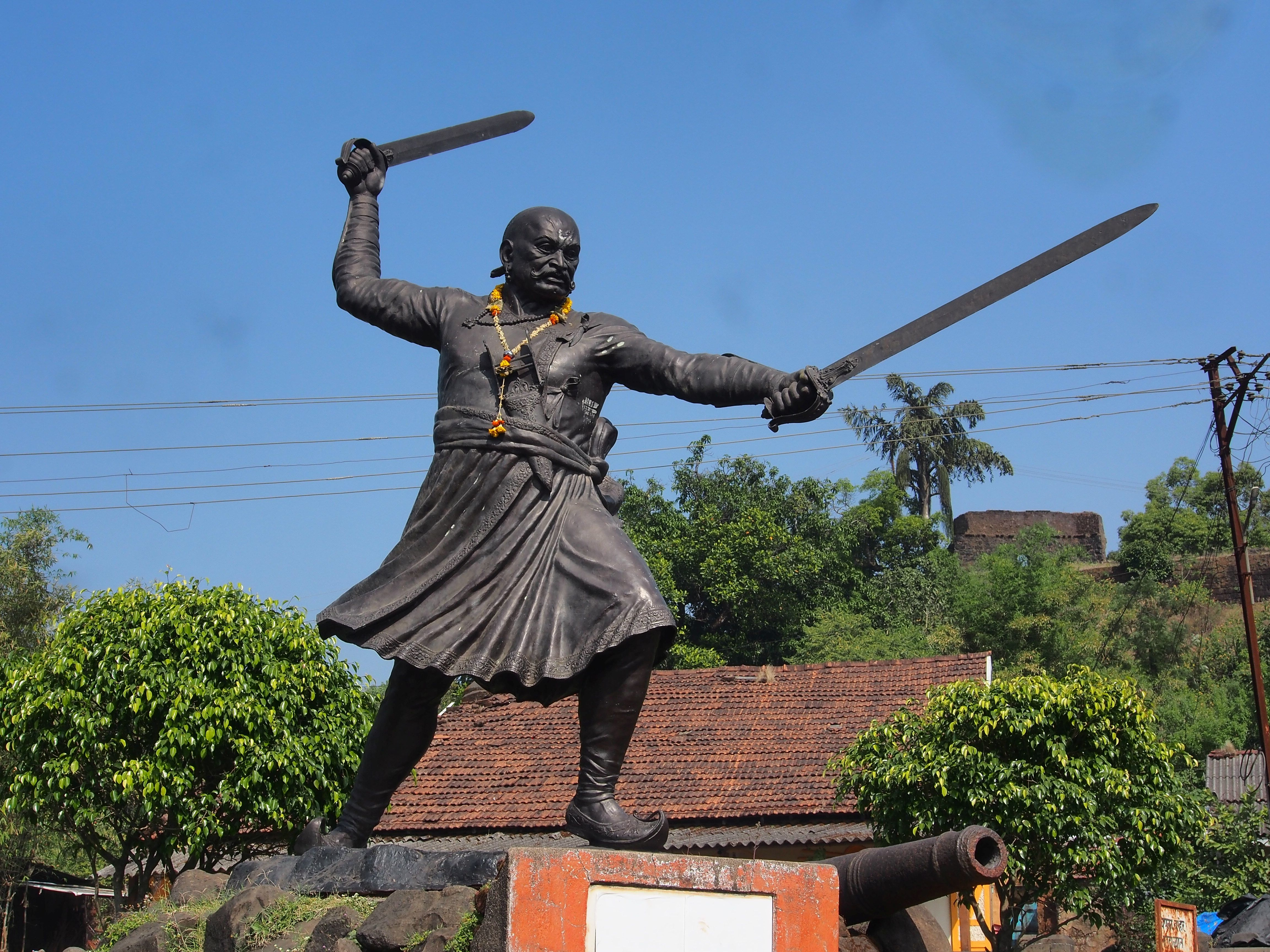
Baji Prabhu Statue, Panhala Fort.

- In 1909, Sri Aurobindo composed an English poem titled Baji Prabhou, describing his heroic sacrifice at the battle at the Panhala Fort.
- Baji Prabhu Deshpande, an Indian silent film about Baji Prabhu was made by Baburao Painter in 1929. Another silent film, Veer Baji, released in the same year and was produced by Omkar Films.
- Indian independence activist and politician Vinayak Damodar Savarkar wrote a ballad about Baji Prabhu but it was banned by the colonial British government. This ban was lifted on 24 May 1946.
- Baji Prabhu's character was played by Prasad Pandit in Raja Shivchhatrapati in the TV series Star Pravah in the 2000s.
- In the 2019-2021 Indian historical TV serial Swarajyajanani Jijamata, he is portrayed by Shripad Panase.
- Ajinkya Deo portrayed Baji Prabhu in 2021 series Jai Bhawani Jai Shivaji which aired on Star Pravah.
- A Marathi-language film, Pawankhind, directed by Digpal Lanjekar and starring Ajay Purkar as Baji Prabhu Deshpande, was released on 18 February 2022.
- Har Har Mahadev, a film directed by Abhijit Deshpande, starring Sharad Kelkar as Baji Prabhu Deshpande and produced by Zee Studios released 25 October 2022 in 5 language (Hindi, Tamil, Telugu and Kannada, along with Marathi).

== See also ==
- Tanaji Malusare, another Sardar known for his bravery at Battle of Sinhagad (1670).
- Netaji Palkar, Sardar Senapati (Commander-in-Chief) of Shivaji.
