= Sameer Dharmadhikari =

Indian television actor

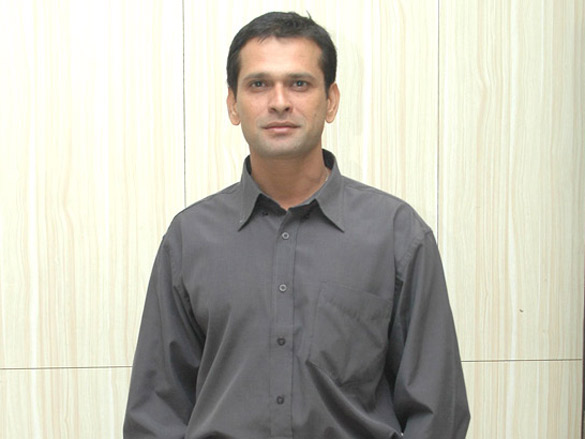
- Born: Pune, Maharashtra, India
- Occupations: Actor, model
- Years active: 1999–present

Sameer Dharmadhikari is an Indian film and television actor and model known for playing the role of Samrat Bindusara Maurya in Chakravartin Ashoka Samrat. He played the male lead in the Marathi film Nirop that won the National Award for the Best Marathi film.

He has worked as a hydraulic machine designer and did theatre in Pune. After moving to Mumbai, he modeled for Vimal Suitings, De Beers, ICICI Bank, Nescafé and was brand ambassador for Raymond Suitings.

== Filmography ==
=== Films ===
Year	Title	Role	Language	Notes
1999	Nirmala Machindra Kamble	Shyamrao 'Guruji' Kamble	Marathi	
1999	Dil Kya Kare	Anand's friend	Hindi	
2002	Quicksand	Handsome Private	English	Directed by Sam Firstenberg
2003	Satta	Vivek M. Chauhan	Hindi	Directed by Madhur Bhandarkar with co-star Raveena Tandon
2004	Agnipankh	Sameer Kelkar	Hindi	
2004	Raincoat	Alok	Hindi	Rituporna Ghosh
2005	Nigehbaan: The Third Eye	Vikram	Hindi	
2006	Katputtli	Dev	Hindi	
2006	Restaurant	Sameer	Marathi	
2006	Manoranjan: The Entertainment	Adbhut Kumar / Saral Kumar	Hindi	
2006	Rafta Rafta – The Speed	Rahul	Hindi	
2007	Game	Ronnie / Rahul	Hindi	
2007	Nirop	Shekhar	Marathi	National award-winning film
2008	Mumbai Meri Jaan	Ajay Pradhan	Hindi	
2008	Rang Rasiya	Sayaji Rao Gaekwad	Hindi	
2009	Lagli Paij		Marathi	
2009	Mata Ekvira Navsala Pavli		Marathi	
2009	For Real	Deepak Choudhury	English	
2009	Samaantar	Keshav's biological son	Marathi	
2010	Lalbaug Paral	Mahendra Seth	Marathi	
2012	Matter	ATS Chief Vikram Pradhan	Marathi	
2012	Baburao La Pakda	Abhay	Marathi	
2013	Maat	Ajay Deshmukh	Hindi	released
2014	Singham Returns	Kishore Kamat	Hindi	
2014	Pyaar Vali Love Story	Prasad Vinayak Bandekar	Marathi	
2015	Prem Ratan Dhan Payo	Raja Dhananjay Maan Singh, King of Pritampur	Hindi	Cameo
2016	Kaul Manacha	Raj's father	Marathi	
2016	Vazandar	Mike, Gym Trainer	Marathi	
2018	Farzand	Beshak Khan	Marathi	
2019	Malaal	Sawant	Hindi	
2019	Fatteshikast	Naamdar Khan	Marathi	
2020	Vajvuya Band Baja	Brother	Marathi	
2021	Nail Polish	DCP Sunil Sachdev	Hindi	A ZEE5 originals film
2021	The Power	Francis Dcosta	Hindi	
2022	Pawankhind	Siddi Johar	Marathi	
2022	Sher Shivraj	Shrimant Kanhoji Raje Jedhe	Marathi	
2023	Jaggu Ani Juliet	Madan Shringarpure	Marathi	
2023	Boyz 4	Kabir's father	Marathi	
2023	Subhedar	Shelar Mama		
2024	Sapala		Marathi	
2024	Lokshahi	Yashwant Chitre	Marathi	
2024	Juna Furniture	Sameer Joshi	Marathi	
2024	Bai Ga	Indra Dev	Marathi	
2024	Sant Dnyaneshwaranchi Muktai	Vithalpant Kulkarni	Marathi	
2025	Abhanga Tukaram	Rameshwar Bhat	Marathi	
2026	Ranapati Shivray: Swari Agra	Aurangzeb	Marathi	

== Television ==
Year	Serial	Role	Notes	References
1997–98	Raja Aur Rancho		Episodic	
2000	Ghar Ek Mandir			
2000–2003	Shree Ganesh	Devraj Indra		
2001	Jap Tap Vrat	PriyaVrat		
2003	Vishnu Puran	Manu		
2011–2012	Yahaaan Main Ghar Ghar Kheli	Raj Singhania		
2008–2009	Main Teri Parchhain Hoon	Siddharth Tyagi		
2009	Jhansi Ki Rani	Gangadhar Rao Newalkar		
2012	Fear Files: Darr Ki Sacchi Tasvirein		Episodic	
2013–14	Buddha	Suddhodana		
2013	Mahabharat	Shantanu	Cameo	
2015–2016	Chakravartin Ashoka Samrat	King Bindusara Maurya		
2016	Adaalat 2	Mr. Gujral		
2017	Iss Pyaar Ko Kya Naam Doon 3			
2017	Peshwa Bajirao	Chhatrapati Shahu		
2019	Yeh Rishtey Hain Pyaar Ke	Mehul Kapadia		
2021	Ghar Ek Mandir – Kripa Agrasen Maharaj Ki	Maharaja Agrasen		
2026–present	Aanandii	Yugandhar Nimbalkar		

=== Web series ===
Year	Title	Role	Platform	Notes
2020	Mum Bhai	Officer Karekar	ALTBalaji, ZEE5	
2022	scam 2003	Tukaram	Sony LIV	
2023	AB LLB	Sudama	MX Player	
