= Bahirji Naik =

Military officer

Bahirji Naik, was a 17th-century great Maratha spy and head of intelligence department in the army of Chatrapati Shivaji Maharaj. Bahirji was honoured with title of "Naik" (transl. Chief) by King Chhatrapati Shivaji Maharaj due to his great work.

As king Chhatrapati Shivaji Maharaj's Chief of Intelligence, he was very successful in his methods. His tomb is currently situated on Bhupalgad (Banurgad) in Khanapur taluka of Sangli district. He was born in the village of Shingave Naik, Ahmednagar.

Not much is or was known about the early life of Bahirji, except that his expeditions and adventures as a spy in king Chhatrapati Shivaji Maharaj's army greatly contributed to the success of the Maratha Empire.

== Role during wars ==
It is said that when a knight from Adil Shah, Afzal Khan, started his journey towards the Maratha Empire in order to capture it, Bahirji poisoned the lead flag-bearing elephants. This led to the enemy abandoning the quest. (The death of a flag-bearing elephant was considered a bad omen.)

In Umbar Khind, a mountain pass near Lonavala, Chhatrapati Shivaji Maharaj ambushed and defeated the 20,000-strong army of Colonel Kartalab Khan, a well-known military officer of Shahiste Khan, in the Battle of Umberkhind. This victory is attributed to Bahirji's intelligence collection. Chhatrapati Shivaji Maharaj captured valuable military equipment and accepted the deserters from Khan's army into his own.

== Role during covert operations ==
Chhatrapati Shivaji Maharaj made a surprise attack on Shahista Khan in Khan's military camp at Pune under the cover of darkness to kill Khan and thus demoralize his army. Khan survived this daring attack but lost three fingers. Chhatrapati Shivaji Maharaj escaped to Sinhagad, while drawing Khan's army into a wild chase to a mountain pass in Katraj. Khan did not die, but he and his army were thoroughly demoralized by the campaign. Within three days of Chhatrapati Shivaji Maharaj’s successful strike, Khan left Pune.

== Role during invasions ==
Bahirji was a key person in Chhatrapati Shivaji Maharaj's many surprise victories and escapes.

Chhatrapati Shivaji Maharaj escaped from Aurangzeb's confinement in Agra, even though the jail itself was surrounded by a 1000-strong army under an able commander, and subsequently traveled 700 miles through Aurangzeb's kingdom to complete his escape.

In a second expedition to Surat, Colonel Ikhlas Khan chased Chhatrapati Shivaji Maharaj’s army to Kanchan Bari (near Nasik), where they engaged in open battle. Khan was unable to maintain the advantage of surprise and lost; Chhatrapati Shivaji Maharaj captured valuable military equipment from Khan due to his victory in the six-hour battle.

== In popular culture ==
- Bahirji Naik, Marathi language film released in 1943
- The second episode of the 2014 Indian Epic TV anthology television series about India's legendary spies, Adrishya, is about Naik.
- His character was significantly depicted in Nitin Desai's serial Raja Shivchhatrapati, it was aired on Star Pravah.
- In the Marathi language film Farzand, the role of Bahirji Naik was played by Prasad Oak
- In Fatteshikast, the role of Bahirji was played by Harish Dudhade.
- In Marathi film Pawankhind, the role of Bahirji Naik was played by Harish Dudhade.
- In film Sher Shivraj, the role of Bahirji Naik was played by its director Digpal Lanjekar
- In films Subhedar and Ranapati Shivray: Swari Agra the role of Bahirji Naik was played by its director Digpal Lanjekar

== See also ==
- Ravindra Kaushik
- Ajit Doval
