= Sher Shivraj (film) =

Marathi language historical drama film

- Theatrical release poster
- Directed by: Digpal Lanjekar
- Written by: Digpal Lanjekar
- Produced by: Nitin Keni; Chinmay Mandlekar; Digpal Lanjekar; Pradyot Pendharkar; Anil Warkhade; Naveen Chandra
- Starring: Chinmay Mandlekar; Mrinal Kulkarni; Mukesh Rishi; Varsha Usgaonkar
- Cinematography: Reshmi Sarkar
- Edited by: Ninad Kaskhedikar; Vinay Shinde
- Music by: Devdutta Manisha Baji
- Production companies: Mumbai Movie Studios Pvt. Ltd.; Raajwarasa Productions; Mulakshar Productions
- Distributed by: UFO Cine Media Network
- Release date: 22 April 2022
- Running time: 153 minutes
- Country: India
- Language: Marathi
- Box office: est.₹17 crore

Sher Shivraj is a 2022 Indian Marathi-language historical action drama film directed by Digpal Lanjekar and produced by Chinmay Mandlekar, Digpal Lanjekar, Nitin Keni, Pradyot Pendharkar and Anil Warkhade. The film based on the life of Maratha king, Shivaji I where he defeated Afzal Khan with brilliant tactics and courage stars Chinmay Mandlekar in title role, Mrinal Kulkarni, Ajay Purkar, Mukesh Rishi along with Bipin Surve and Rohan Mankani in supporting roles. The film was released theatrically on 22 April 2022.

With the launch of trailer of the film through Metaverse, it became the first Marathi film trailer to be shown through Metaverse technology.

== Synopsis ==
It is the story of great Maratha king, Shivaji I where he defeated Afzal Khan with brilliant tactics and courages. It also focuses on psychological techniques Shivaji I exhibited during the mission.

== Cast ==
- Chinmay Mandlekar as Shivaji I
- Mrinal Kulkarni as Rajmata Jijabai
- Ravindra Mankani as Shahajiraje
- Mukesh Rishi as Afzal Khan
- Mrunmayee Deshpande as Kesarbai
- Rohan Mankani as Randullah Khan
- Bipin Surve as Baji Sarjerao Jedhe
- Ajay Purkar as Subhedar Tanaji Malusare
- Varsha Usgaonkar as Badi Begum
- Digpal Lanjekar as Bahirji Naik
- Sameer Dharmadhikari as Kanhoji Jedhe
- Dipti Ketkar as Matoshri Dipaiau Bandal
- Isha Keskar as Queen Saibai
- Madhavi Neemkar as Queen Soyarabai
- Nikhil Lanjekar as Narveer Jivaji Mahale
- Sushruta Mankani as Yesaji Kank
- Astad Kale as Vishwas Dighe
- Akshay Waghmare as Pilaji Gole
- Rishi Saxena as Fazal Khan
- Sangram Salvi as Yakut Khan
- Vaibhav Mangle as Gopinath Pant Bokila
- Vikram Gaikwad as Sarnobat Netaji Palkar
- Sachin Bhilare as Aaginya
- Sachin Deshpande as Moropant
- Alka Kubal as Tulja Bhavani (Guest appearance)
- Kunaal Dhumal as Kondaji Kank

== Soundtrack ==
Sher Shivraj

Soundtrack album by Devdutta Manisha Baji
- Released: April 2022
- Recorded: 2022
- Genre: Feature film soundtrack
- Length: 13:05
- Language: Marathi
- Label: Zee Music Company

Devdutta Manisha Baji chronology
Pawankhind (2022)	Sher Shivraj (2022)	Subhedar (2023)

Official audio
- Sher Shivraj - Full Album on YouTube

Soundtrack of the film is composed by Devdutta Manisha Baji and lyrics are written by Digpal Lanjekar and Santsreshtra Tukaram. In track "He Shaktipeeth Nayike" traditional lyrics have been used.

Track listing
No.	Title	Lyrics	Singer(s)	Length
1.	"Yelkot Devacha"	Digpal Lanjekar	Adarsh Shinde, Juilee Joglekar	3:04
2.	"Shivba Raja"	Digpal Lanjekar	Avadhoot Gandhi	4:13
3.	"He Shaktipeeth Nayike"	Traditional	Avadhoot Gandhi	2:47
4.	"Amhi Veer Jhunzaar"	Santsreshtra Tukaram Maharaj	Avadhoot Gandhi and Chorus	3:01
Total length:				13:05

== Release ==
=== Theatrical ===
The film was released in cinemas on 22 April 2022.

=== Home media ===
The film was digitally streamed on Amazon Prime Video from 30 May 2022.

== Reception ==
=== Critical response ===
Mihir Bhanage of The Times of India gave 3 stars out of 5, and praised the performances of Chinmay Mandlekar, Mukesh Rishi, Sameer Dharmadhikari, Ajay Purkar, Mrinal Kulkarni, Vaibhav Mangle, Isha Keskar and Digpal Lanjekar. He stated, "these actors take the experience of watching this film a notch higher." He also appreciated the songs and special effects. He wrote, "songs are good, particularly Shivba Raja". Concluding the review he wrote "the film is a decent watch, that deserves to be watched on the big screen for the atmosphere it creates."

=== Box office ===
The film collected ₹1.50 crore on its opening day and ₹4.20 crore in its opening weekend. According io Bollywood Hungama, tlm earned 3.25 net in first week. Reportedly the five days collection is around ₹5.44 crore.

== See also ==
- Battle of Pratapgarh
