= Farzand =

2018 Marathi language epic historical drama film

- Theatrical release poster
- Directed by: Digpal Lanjekar
- Written by: Digpal Lanjekar
- Screenplay by: Digpal Lanjekar
- Story by: Digpal Lanjekar
- Produced by: Anirban Sarkar
- Starring: Prasad Oak; Ankit Mohan; Chinmay Mandlekar; Mrinal Kulkarni; Mrunmayee Deshpande; Pravin Tarde
- Cinematography: Kedar Gaekwad
- Edited by: Pramod Kahar
- Music by: Amitraj
- Production company: Swami Samarth Creations LLP
- Distributed by: AA Films
- Release date: 1 June 2018
- Running time: 155 minutes
- Country: India
- Language: Marathi
- Box office: est.₹10 crore

Farzand is a 2018 Indian Marathi-language historical drama War film directed by Digpal Lanjekar and produced by Anirban Sarkar under the banner of Swami Samarth Creations LLP. The film was co-produced by Sandip Jadhav, Mahesh Jaurkar and Swapnil Potdar. The film stars Prasad Oak, Ankit Mohan, Chinmay Mandlekar, Mrinal Kulkarni, Mrunmayee Deshpande, Neha Joshi and Sameer Dharmadhikari. It's the first film of the Shri Shivraj Ashtak film series by Lanjekar in an eight part series based on Maratha Empire. It was followed by Fatteshikast in 2019.

Farzand follows the story of warrior Kondaji Farzand, who along with 60 warriors defeated 2500 soldiers of the enemy to win the Panhala fort in just three and half hours in 1673. The film was released on 1 June 2018. The film received generally positive reviews and was declared a commercial success.

== Plot ==
The story begins with the fall of Tanaji Malusare, in capturing Kondana fort near Pune from a Mughal garrison in 1670. Three years later, when Shivaji Maharaj's coronation is to be held, Shivaji Maharaj wishes that he is crowned only when his kingdom and his people have peace and security. Panhala fort is still under the command of a cruel general, Beshak Khan, of the Adil Shah of Bijapur, whose forces harass the peasantry. The previous attempt to capture the fort in 1666, which he had held briefly in 1660 had failed. To recapture the fort, a mission is planned and Shivaji Maharaj appoints Kondaji Farzand general for the mission. Farzand picks 60 soldiers for an assault on the fort defended by the 2500-strong garrison. Bahirji Naik, the spy, and an informer Kesar helped in defeating 2500 soldiers of the enemy to win the Panhala fort in just three and half hours.

== Cast ==
- Chinmay Mandlekar as Shivaji Maharaj
- Prasad Oak as Bahirji Naik, the spy
- Mrinal Kulkarni as Jijabai
- Ankit Mohan as Sardar Kondaji Farzand (voice dubbed by Sachit Patil)
- Mrunmayee Deshpande as Kesar
- Neha Joshi as Kamali (wife of Kondaji)
- Sameer Dharmadhikari as Sardar Beshak Khan
- Ganesh Yadav as Subhedar Tanaji Malusare
- Nikhil Raut as Kisna
- Pravin Tarde as Martya Ramoshi
- Ajay Purkar as Motyaji Khalekar
- Astad Kale as Gundoji
- Pradhuman Singh as Kamad Khan
- Harish Dudhade as Ganoji Kawle
- Rahul Mehendale as Annaji Datto Sachiv
- Rajan Bhise as Hiroji Indalkar
- Ganesh Tidke as Budhaji

== Production ==
The principal photography began in November 2017.

== Release ==
The film was theatrically released on 1 June 2018.

== Soundtrack ==
Farzand

Soundtrack album by Amitraj
- Released: 16 May 2018
- Recorded: 2018
- Genre: Feature film soundtrack
- Length: 20:12
- Language: Marathi
- Label: Zee Music Company

Amitraj chronology
Deva (2017)	Farzand (2018)	Party (2018)
External audio
- Audio Jukebox on YouTube

The songs for the film are composed by Amitraj and lyrics by Digpal Lanjekar and Kshitij Patavrdhan.

Track list
No.	Title	Lyrics	Music	Singer(s)	Length
1.	"Aai Ambe Jagdambe"	Digpal Lanjekar	Amitraj	Adarsh Shinde	4:17
2.	"Tumhi Yetana Kela Eshara"	Kshitij Patavrdhan	Amitraj	Vaishali Samant	4:20
3.	"Vajrabahu Mahabahu (Kondaji Theme)" (Theme by Kedar Divekar)	Digpal Lanjekar		Chorus	2:14
4.	"Shivaba Malhari" (Theme by Kedar Divekar)	Digpal Lanjekar		Prasad Oak, Ajay Purkar, Nikhil Raut, Astad Kale, Harish Dudhade & Sachin Deshpande	4:19
5.	"Shiv Mudra (Shivaji Theme)" (Theme by Kedar Divekar)	Digpal Lanjekar		Chorus	1:58
6.	"Jijau Saheb (Jijau Theme)" (Theme by Kedar Divekar)	Digpal Lanjekar		Chorus	1:21
7.	"Raigad Prashasti (Raigad Theme)" (Theme by Kedar Divekar)	Digpal Lanjekar		Chorus	0:45
Total length:					20:12

== Reception ==
=== Critical response ===
Renuka Vyavahare of The Times of India rated the film with three and a half stars out of five and praised the casting. She noted that it lent credibility to this Marathi period film. Mentioning Ankit Mohan, Chinmay Mandlekar, Prasad Oak, Mrunmayee Deshpande and Mrinal Kulkarni, she praised their acting. She felt that lack of scale and Visual effects, was made up by performances and intent. Concluding, she said, "Farzand turns out to be more informative than entertaining, but it does manage to fairly engage you, even more if you happen to be a history enthusiast, a vigilante or a rebel with a cause." Ganesh Matkari of Pune Mirror gave the film three stars out of five, concurring with Vyavahare he praised the ensemble. He criticized the clean approach to the film as he noted, "But as we see them entering the fort and even in the middle of a fight, there isn’t a spot of dirt on their bright uniforms." He concluded, "Farzand is an ambitious, but old-school film which promises an engrossing experience, if you are willing to adjust your expectations." Lokmat rated the film with three and half stars out of five. Abhay Salvi of Marathi Stars rated the film with three and half stars out of five and noted, "For all Maharaj devotees Farzand is the film they were waiting for! And for other Marathi audiences too for the first time you could experience a spirited historical epic that has great performances & which also shies away from too much jingoism."

=== Box office ===
The life time collection of the Farzand was ₹10 crores, and the film was declared a commercial success.

== Home video ==
The film was made available as VOD on Hotstar in 2018.
