= Digpal Lanjekar =

Marathi film director and writer

- Occupations: Director; writer
- Years active: 2018–present
- Known for: Shri Shivraj Ashtak

Digpal Lanjekar is an Indian film director and writer who is known for the Shri Shivraj Ashtak.

== Filmography ==
All films are in Marathi, unless mentioned.

Key
†	Denotes films that have not yet been released

Year	Title	Direction	Acting	Screenplay	Story	Lyrics	Production	Notes	Ref
2018	Farzand	Yes	No	Yes	Yes	Yes	No	Debut	
2019	Fatteshikast	Yes	Yes	Yes	Yes	Yes	No	Played role as Shri Sarjerao Jedhe	
2022	Pawankhind	Yes	No	Yes	Yes	Yes	No		
2022	Sher Shivraj	Yes	Yes	Yes	Yes	Yes	No	Played as Bahirji Naik	
2023	Subhedar	Yes	Yes	Yes	Yes	Yes	Yes	Played as Bahirji Naik	
2024	Shivrayancha Chhava	Yes	No	No	No	No	No		
2025	Sant Dnyaneshwaranchi Muktai	Yes	No	Yes	Yes	No	Yes	Based on Muktabai	
2025	Abhanga Tukaram	Yes	No	Yes	No	No	No		
2026	Ranapati Shivray: Swari Agra	Yes	No	Yes	Yes	No	No		
TBA	Bhadrakali †	No	No	No	Yes	No	No	Upcoming film	
