= Mrinal Kulkarni =

Indian actress (born 1968)

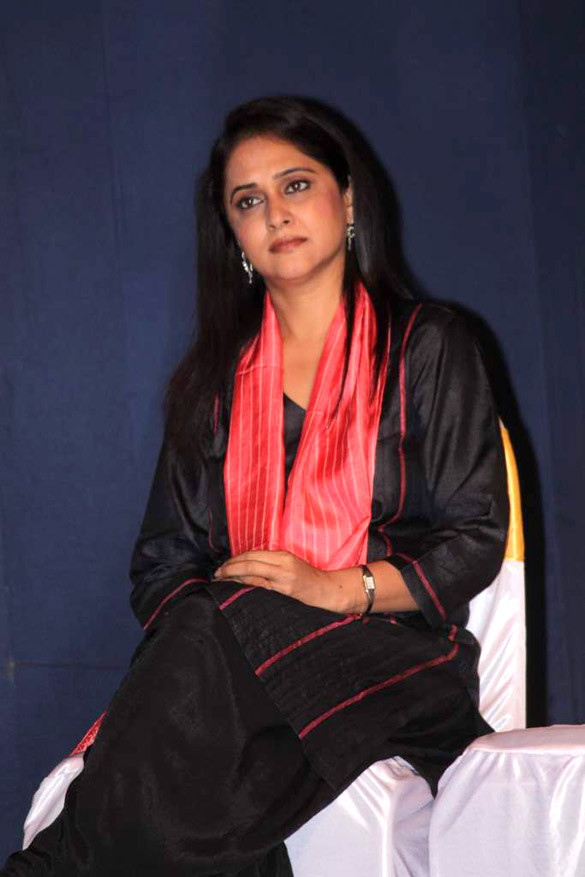
- Kulkarni in 2012
- Born: Mrinal Deo; 21 June 1968 (age 58); Pune, Maharashtra, India
- Occupation: Actress
- Known for: Meerabai; Son Pari
- Spouse: Ruchir Kulkarni (m. 1990)
- Children: Virajas Kulkarni (b. 1992)
- Parent(s): Vijay Deo (father); Veena Deo (mother)
- Relatives: Jairam Kulkarni (Father-in-law)

Mrinal Kulkarni (née Deo; born 21 June 1968) is an Indian actress and director known for her work in several films and television productions. She is best known for her role as Mirabai in Doordarshan's Meerabai and as a fairy on Star Plus's Son Pari.

She has also acted in Marathi language and Hindi TV serials and films.

== Early life, family and education ==
Mrinal was born on 21 June 1968 into a Marathi family in Pune to Dr. Vijay Deo and Dr. Veena Deo. She has a sister named Madhura.

She has a Master's degree in Linguistics from Pune University.

She married her childhood friend Ruchir Kulkarni in 1990 and they have a son, Virajas, who is also a part of Marathi film industry.

She lost her father to illness on 11 April 2019 and her mother died on 29 October 2024.

== Direction ==
Mrinal debuted as a Director with the Marathi film, Prem Mhanje... Prem Mhanje.... Prem Asta. The story of the film was written by herself. After that, she directed Marathi historical drama Rama Madhav.

== Filmography ==
=== Films ===
Year	Title	Role	Language	Notes
1989	Kamla Ki Maut	Charu S. Patel	Hindi	Debut film
1994	Maza Saubhagya	Sumati	Marathi	Marathi film debut & lead role
1995	Jamla Ho Jamla	Sangita Dhurandhar	Marathi	Lead role
1996	Jai Dakshineshwar Kali Maa	Jyoti	Hindi	Lead role
2000	Jodidar	Suniti Deshmukh	Marathi	Zee Chitra Gaurav Puraskar for Best Actress
2000	Dr. Babasaheb Ambedkar	Savita Ambedkar	English, Hindi	Bilingual film
2000	Lekroo	Anu	Marathi	
2001	Aashiq	Sapna Devi	Hindi	Supporting role
2003	Vishwas	Sangeeta	Marathi	Lead role
2004	Uuf Kya Jaadoo Mohabbat Hai	Pari's sister	Hindi	Supporting role
2005	Kuchh Meetha Ho Jaye	Chanchal Chugh	Hindi	Special appearance
2005	Rajkaran	Anna's wife	Marathi	
2006	Quest	Doctor	English, Marathi	Bilingual film
2006	Bayo	Raavi	Marathi	
2006	Raasta Roko	Mrunal	Hindi	
2007	Deha	Young Sandhya Joshi	Marathi	Special appearance
2008	Tuzyat Mazyat	Asmita	Marathi	Lead role
2012	Kashala Udyachi Baat	Sakshi	Marathi	
2012	Shiv Chatrapati	Rajmata Jijau	Marathi	
2012	Aarohi Gosht Tighanchi	Sneha Apte	Marathi	
2012	Jai Jai Maharashtra Majha	Unnamed	Marathi	Guest appearance
2013	Prem Mhanje Prem Mhanje Prem Asta	Anushree	Marathi	
2014	A Rainy Day	Mugdha Pradhan	Marathi	Lead role
2014	Yellow	Mugdha	Marathi	Nominated Filmfare Award for Best Actress – Marathi
2014	Rama Madhav	Gopikabai	Marathi	Parallel lead
2015	Rajwade and Sons	Laxmi Rajwade-Joshi	Marathi	Supporting role
2016	& Jara Hatke	Meera	Marathi	Nominated Filmfare Award for Best Supporting Actress – Marathi
2017	Sambhaji 1689	Rajmata Jijau	Marathi	
2018	Farzand	Rajmata Jijau	Marathi	
2018	Ye Re Ye Re Paisa	Janhavi Mujumdar	Marathi	
2019	Ye Re Ye Re Paisa 2	Janhavi Mujumdar	Marathi	
2019	Fatteshikast	Rajmata Jijau	Marathi	Nominated Filmfare Award for Best Supporting Actress – Marathi
2022	Pawankhind	Rajmata Jijau	Marathi	
2022	The Kashmir Files	Laxmi Dutt	Hindi	
2022	Dear Dia	Adi's mother	Hindi	
2022	Sher Shivraj	Rajmata Jijau	Marathi	Nominated Filmfare Award for Best Supporting Actress – Marathi
2022	Goshta Eka Paithanichi	Smitatai	Marathi	
2023	Saath Sobat	Madhura	Marathi	
2023	Sari	Dr. Laxmi (Lucky)	Marathi	
2023	Subhedar	Rajmata Jijau	Marathi	
2024	Ek Don Teen Chaar	Sayali's Mother	Marathi	
2024	Sant Dnyaneshwaranchi Muktai	Rukmini	Marathi	
2024	Gulaabi	Madhuri Joshi	Marathi	
2024	Dhai Aakhar	Praveen Arora	Hindi	
2024	Mrs.	Richa's Mother	Hindi	
2025	Abhanga Tukaram	Jijabai	Marathi	
2026	Ranapati Shivray: Swari Agra	Jijabai	Marathi	
2026	Aakhri Sawal	Prabha Nadkarni	Hindi	
2026	Bandkhor	Sharda	Marathi	

=== Television ===
Year	Title	Role	Language	Notes
1987	Shrikant	Abhaya	Hindi	Debut series
1988	Swami	Ramabai Peshwa	Hindi	Lead role
1994	The Great Maratha	Ahilyabai Holkar	Hindi	Supporting role
1996	Hasratein	Asmita Trivedi	Hindi	Supporting role
1997	Mirabai	Mirabai	Hindi	Lead role
1997	Saturday Suspense	Mrunal	Hindi	Episode number. 98
1997-1998	Chattan	Purnima Vishal Raj	Hindi	
1998	Teacher	Uma	Hindi	Parallel lead
1998	Rishtey	Mrunal	Hindi	Episodic role
1998-2000	Sparsh	Bhoomika	Hindi	Lead role
2000	Zindagi... Teri Meri Kahani	Rani	Hindi	Episodic role
2000-2001	Noorjahan	Habba Khatoon	Hindi	
2001-2002	Draupadi	Draupadi	Hindi	Lead role
2000-2004	Son Pari	Son Pari	Hindi	Lead role
2002-2005	Avantika	Avantika	Marathi	Lead role
2006	Astitva... Ek Prem Kahani	Dr. Sakshi	Hindi	Cameo appearance
2008-2009	Raja Shivchhatrapati	Rajmata Jijau	Marathi	Parallel lead
2009-2010	Raja Ki Aayegi Baraat	Kalyani Sisodia (Chhoti Rani)	Hindi	
2010-2011	Kaali - Ek Agnipariksha	Sushma Rai/Aditi Choudhary	Hindi	
2011-2012	Guntata Hriday He	Nayana Banarase	Marathi	Lead role
2012-2013	Mujhse Kuchh Kehti...Yeh Khamoshiyaan	Pratiksha Bhosale	Hindi	Supporting role
2020	Mi Honar Superstar	Judge	Marathi	Reality show

=== Web series ===
Year	Title	Role	Platform	Notes
2021	Jeet Ki Zid	Deep's Mother	ZEE5	
2024	Indian Police Force	Rukhsana Malik	Amazon prime video	
2024	Paithani	Godavari	ZEE5	

=== Films written and directed ===
- Rama Madhav - 2014
- Prem Mhanje Prem Mhanje Prem Asta - 2013
- Ti and Ti - 2019

=== Television commercial ===
- Popular TV commercial Vicco Turmeric ayurvedic skin cream

== Awards and nominations ==
Kulkarni has won following awards-

1. 1994 Maharashtra State Film Awards - Maharashtra State Film Award for Best Actress For Film Maajha saubhagya.
2. 2001 Screen Award in the Best Actress category for her role in the Marathi film Jodidar (2000).
- Nominated Filmfare Award for Best Actress – Marathi for film Yellow
- She has received three nominations at the Filmfare Awards Marathi for Best Supporting Actress for her films, & Jara Hatke (2016), Fatteshikast (2019) and Sher Shivraj(2022).
