= Chinmay Mandlekar =

Indian actor, writer and stage director (born 1979)

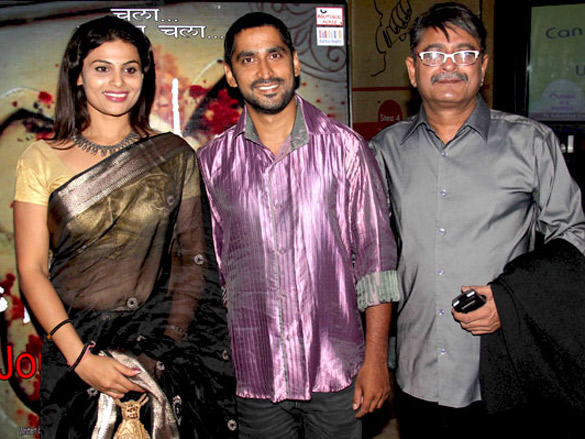
- Mandlekar in the middle
- Born: 2 February 1979 (age 47); Mumbai, Maharashtra, India
- Education: National School of Drama
- Occupations: Actor; producer; stage director; writer; lyricist
- Known for: The Kashmir Files; Tu Majha Saangaati; Tu Tithe Me; Farzand; Fatteshikast; Pawankhind

Chinmay Mandlekar (born 2 February 1979) is an Indian actor, writer and stage director, mostly active in the Marathi entertainment industry. He is known for his work in Zenda, Morya, Farzand (2018), Fatteshikast (2019), The Kashmir Files (2022) and Pawankhind (2022). He has also completed many episodes of a crime series (Crime Patrol) as SI Rajesh Jadhav. Chinmay has been praised as a brilliant actor for the versatility of roles picked by him.

== Biography ==
Chinmay Mandlekar was born in a Marathi speaking Chandraseniya Kayastha Prabhu family. A graduate of the National School of Drama, Mandlekar has written, directed or acted in successful plays such as Bechaki and Sukhanshi Bhandto Aamhi.

In films, Mandlekar is active as an actor and a writer, having starred in Marathi movies like Zenda, Morya or Gajaar: Journey of the Soul. On the small screen, his role opposite Mrunal Dusanis in the hit TV serial Tu Tithe Me turned him into a household name in Maharashtra.

Mandlekar has also had supporting roles in Hindi movies, such as Tere Bin Laden and Shanghai. He is married and has 2 children, a daughter and a son. In 2017, Chimay Mandlekar was a part of Marathi TV Series Sakhya Re on Colors Marathi. He played the lead role of Saint Tukaram in Marathi serial Tu Maza Sangati. From 2020 to 2021, he wrote and produced Marathi series Chandra Aahe Sakshila that aired on Colors Marathi.

== Filmography ==
=== Films ===
Key
†	Denotes films that have not yet been released

Year	Title	Role	Language	Note
2009	Zenda	Avinash Mohite	Marathi	
2009	Jogwa	Sakya	Marathi	
2010	Tere Bin Laden	Usmaan	Hindi	
2010	Krantiveer Rajguru	Shivaram Rajguru	Marathi	
2011	Gajaar	Parth	Marathi	
2011	Morya	Sameer	Marathi	
2012	Shanghai	SSP Chavan	Hindi	
2012	Mokala Shwas	Ad & Filmmaker	Marathi	
2012	Hou De Jarasa Ushir	Sarjerao	Marathi	
2012	Vijay Aso	Shankar Gawde	Marathi	
2013	Mokssh	Parth	Hindi	
2014	Swami Public Ltd.	Siddharth	Marathi	
2014	Pyaar Vali Love Story	Inspector Alam	Marathi	
2015	Lokmanya: Ek Yug Purush	Makarand	Marathi	Nominated Filmfare Award for Best Supporting Actor – Marathi
2015	Mahanayak Vasant Tu	Vasantrao Naik	Marathi	
2016	Ticha Umbartha	Dinesh	Marathi	
2016	Reti	Shankarya	Marathi	
2017	Sameer	Shaheed	Hindi	
2017	Halal	Maulana	Marathi	Nominated Filmfare Award for Best Supporting Actor – Marathi
2018	Farzand	Shivaji I	Marathi	
2018	Bhavesh Joshi Superhero	Sunil Jadhav	Hindi	
2019	Mauli	Preacher in temple	Marathi	
2019	Perfume	Mehak's brother	Marathi	
2019	Smile Please	Guest appearance in song	Marathi	
2019	Hirkani	Guest appearance in song	Marathi	
2019	Fatteshikast	Shivaji I	Marathi	
2022	Pawankhind	Shivaji I	Marathi	
2022	Sher Shivraj	Shivaji I	Marathi	
2022	The Kashmir Files	Farooq Malik "Bitta"	Hindi	
2023	Gandhi Godse – Ek Yudh	Nathuram Godse	Hindi	
2023	Aalay Mazya Rashila		Marathi	
2023	Subhedar	Shivaji I	Marathi	
2023	Sajini Shinde Ka Viral Video	Inspector Ram Pawar	Hindi	
2024	Sapala		Marathi	
2024	Shivrayancha Chhava	Shivaji I	Marathi	
2026	Bol Bol Rani	Malak	Marathi	

=== Television ===
Year	Title	Role	Language	References
2005	Vadalvaat	Samsher Singh	Marathi	
2007	Asambhav	Abhimaan Saranjame	Marathi	
2009	Agnihotra	Sharu Band	Marathi	
2012–2014	Tu Tithe Me	Satyajeet Mudholkar	Marathi	
2014–2018	Tu Majha Saangaati	Tukaram	Marathi	
2020–2021	Ek Thi Begum	Vikram Bhosale	Hindi	
2020–2021	Crime Patrol	SI Rajesh Jadhav	Hindi	
2023	Kaala Paani	Dr. Shashi Mahajan	Hindi	
2024	Maeri	ACP Avinash Khandekar	Hindi	
2026	Daldal	Vikram Sathe	Hindi	
2026	Sanai Chaughade	Satyajeet Pathare	Marathi	

As director

Year	Title	Language	Notes
2025	Inspector Zende	Hindi	Debut
2026	Governor †	Hindi	
