= Zee Chitra Gaurav Puraskar for Best Actress =

Zee Chitra Gaurav Puraskar for Best Actress in a Leading Role
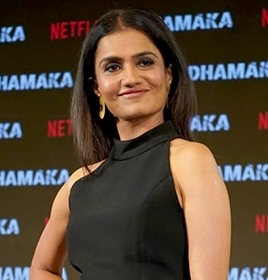
- The 2026 recipient: Amruta Subhash
- Awarded for: Best Performance by an Actress in a Leading Role
- Country: India
- Presented by: Zee Marathi
- First award: Mrinal Kulkarni, Jodidaar (2000)
- Currently held by: Amruta Subhash; Jarann (2026)

The Zee Chitra Gaurav Puraskar for Best Actor – Female is chosen by the viewers of Zee Marathi as part of its annual award ceremony for Marathi films, to recognise a male actor who has delivered an outstanding performance in a leading role.

== List of winners and nominees ==
=== 2000s ===
Year	Photos of winners	Actor	Roles(s)	Film
2000		Mrinal Kulkarni	Suniti Deshmukh	Jodidaar
2000		Sonali Kulkarni	Vasudha	Gharabaher
2000		Sharvari Jamenis	Vaijayanti (Vaiju) Patil	Bindhaast
2002	–	Shital Kshirsagar	Vadi	Ek Hoti Vadi
2002	–	Shilpa Tulaskar	Sujata	Devki
2002	–	Alka Kubal	Vasudha	Devki
2004		Aditi Deshpande	Vidya Raut	Not Only Mrs. Raut
2004		Madhura Velankar	Adv. Swati Dandavate	Not Only Mrs. Raut
2004		Vrunda Gajendra	Saguna	Vitthal Vitthal
2005		Neena Kulkarni	Durgi	Uttarayan
2005		Kartika Rane	Madhura	Saatchya Aat Gharat
2005		Sonali Kulkarni	Seena	Devrai
2005		Mukta Barve	Chhaya	Chakwa
2006	–	Aishwarya Narkar	Sarita	Olakh
2006	–	Nandita Das	Chandi	Maati Maay
2006	–	Neena Kulkarni	Vidya Barve	Shevri
2008		Sonalee Kulkarni	Bakula	Bakula Namdeo Ghotale
2008		Ashwini Bhave	Gayatri	Kadachit
2008		Devika Daftardar	Devi	Sawar Re
2008		Prateeksha Lonkar	Shakun	Aevdhese Aabhal
2008		Pallavi Vaidya	Tai	Dada Fakt Tujhyasathi
2009		Mukta Barve	Suli	Jogwa
2009		Sonali Kulkarni	Vidya	Gulmohar
2009		Nivedita Joshi-Saraf	Savitri	Savitrichya Leki
2009		Leena Bhagwat	Bhiki	Doha
2009		Mrinal Kulkarni	Asmita	Tuzya Mazyat

=== 2010s ===
Year	Photos of winners	Actor	Roles(s)	Film
2010		Pallavi Joshi	Rita	Rita
2010		Amruta Khanvilkar	Neha Shroff	Gaiir
2010		Madhavi Juvekar	Manda	Jhing Chik Jhing
2011		Urmilla Kanitkar	Yashoda	Mala Aai Vhhaychy!
2011		Mukta Barve	Gauri	Mumbai-Pune-Mumbai
2011		Tejaswini Pandit	Sindhutai Sapkal	Mee Sindhutai Sapkal
2011		Vaidehi Parshurami	Rupali	Ved Laavi Jeeva
2011		Mitalee Jagtap Varadkar	Shirmi	Baboo Band Baaja
2012		Sonali Kulkarni	Gauri/Vasumati	Pratibimb
2012		Urmilla Kanitkar	Vishakha	Dubhang
2012		Tejaswini Lonari	Chinu	Chinu
2012		Trupti Bhoir	Durga	Hello Jai Hind!
2012		Manasi Salvi	ACP Vidya Pandit	Sadrakshnay
2013		Priya Bapat	Uma Damle	Kaksparsh
2013		Amruta Subhash	Sarika	Masala
2013		Devika Daftardar	Revati Sathe	Samhita
2013		Supriya Vinod	Prachi	Investment
2013		Veena Jamkar	Ganga	Kutumb
2014		Iravati Harshe	Ira Shastri	Astu
2014		Sonali Kulkarni	Mandakini Amte	Dr. Prakash Baba Amte – The Real Hero
2014		Sai Tamhankar	Shirin Ghadge	Duniyadari
2015		Tejaswini Pandit	Vibha	Ticha Umbartha
2015		Sai Tamhankar	Shubhada	Sau Shashi Deodhar
2015		Priya Bapat	Janaki	Happy Journey
2015		Usha Naik	Budhi	Ek Hazarachi Note
2015		Veena Jamkar	Meera	Taptapadi
2016		Mukta Barve	Manjiri Naik	Double Seat
2016		Medha Manjrekar	Kaveri Belwalkar	Natsamrat
2016		Sonalee Kulkarni	Nandini	Mitwaa
2016		Priya Bapat	Prajakta Lele	Timepass 2
2016		Pooja Sawant	Sonal	Dagadi Chawl
2017		Iravati Harshe	Janaki	Kaasav
2017		Rinku Rajguru	Archana (Archi) Patil	Sairat
2017		Parna Pethe	Madhu/Mala	Photocopy
2018		Sonali Kulkarni	Shaila Katdare	Kachcha Limboo
2018		Mrinmayee Godbole	Savitri (Savi)	Chi Va Chi Sau Ka
2018		Priya Bapat	Keerti	Gachchi
2018		Mukta Barve	Samaira Joshi	Hrudayantar
2018		Pooja Sawant	Neha	Lapachhapi
2019		Kalyani Muley	Yamuna	Nude
2019		Mrinal Kulkarni	Janhavi Majumdar	Ye Re Ye Re Paisa
2019		Gauri Mahajan	Smita	Pushpak Vimaan
2019		Priya Bapat	Savitri (Saavi)	Aamhi Doghi
2020		Sayali Sanjeev	Haripriya Khatmode	Aatpadi Nights
2020		Sai Tamhankar	Alisha/Payal	Girlfriend
2020		Nandita Patkar	Anandi	Baba
2020		Bhagyashree Milind	Anandi Gopal Joshi	Anandi Gopal

=== 2020s ===
Year	Photos of winners	Actor	Roles(s)	Film
2021		Not Awarded		
2022		Mukta Barve	Suli	Jogwa
2022		No Other Nominees		
2023		Hruta Durgule	Ananya	Ananya
2023		Sayali Sanjeev	Indrayani	Goshta Eka Paithanichi
2023		Amruta Khanvilkar	Chandramukhi	Chandramukhi
2023		Genelia Deshmukh	Shravani Jadhav	Ved
2023		Mukta Barve	Dr. Aarti Deshmukh	Y
2023		Sonalee Kulkarni	Shefali	Tamasha Live
2024		Rohini Hattangadi, Vandana Gupte, Sukanya Kulkarni, Suchitra Bandekar, Shilpa Navalkar, Deepa Parab	Jaya, Shashi, Sadhana, Ketaki, Pallavi, Charu	Baipan Bhaari Deva
2024		Madhura Velankar	Megha	Butterfly
2024		Gauri Deshpande	Yashoda	Shyamchi Aai
2025		Vaidehi Parshurami	Sayali	Ek Don Teen Chaar
2025		Prajakta Mali	Phullwanti	Phullwanti
2025		Mukta Barve	Rani	Nach Ga Ghuma
2025		Pallavi Paranjape	Keerthi Potdar	Amaltash
2025		Rucha Vaidya	Suvarna	Paani
2025		Priyadarshini Indalkar	Sukanya	Navardev Bsc. Agri
2026		Amruta Subhash	Radha	Jarann
2026		Renuka Shahane	Uma Bhalerao	Uttar
2026		Hruta Durgule	Prachi Dixit	Aarpar
2026		Sai Tamhankar	Neeta Dhawale	Gulkand
2026		Vaidehi Parshurami	Bhamini	Sangeet Manapmaan
