= The Signature =

Indian drama film

- Official release poster
- Directed by: Gajendra Ahire
- Based on: Anumati (2013 Marathi film)
- Produced by: K. C. Bokadia; Anupam Kher
- Starring: Anupam Kher; Mahima Chaudhry; Ranvir Shorey; Annu Kapoor; Manoj Joshi; Neena Kulkarni
- Cinematography: Krishna Soren
- Edited by: Anant Kamath
- Music by: Rohit Sharma
- Production company: Anupam Kher Studio
- Distributed by: ZEE5
- Release date: 4 October 2024
- Country: India
- Language: Hindi

The Signature is a 2024 Hindi-language drama film directed by Gajendra Ahire and produced by K. C. Bokadia and Anupam Kher Studio. It is a Hindi adaptation of the National Award-winning 2013 Marathi film Anumati, which originally starred Vikram Gokhale. The Hindi remake features Anupam Kher in the lead role, with Mahima Chaudhry, Ranvir Shorey, Annu Kapoor, Manoj Joshi, and Neena Kulkarni in supporting roles. The film was premiered on 4 October 2024, on the streaming platform ZEE5 and had an early screening at the Namaste Vietnam Festival in 2023.

== Plot ==
The Signature centers around an elderly man whose life takes a tragic turn when his wife becomes critically ill and is hospitalized. As her condition worsens, the man faces numerous financial and emotional challenges in his efforts to save her. Despite his growing hopelessness, he finds support from an old college friend who helps him navigate his difficulties.

== Cast ==
- Anupam Kher as Arvind, the elderly husband
- Mahima Chaudhry as Ambu aka Ambika
- Ranvir Shorey
- Annu Kapoor as Arvind's close friend
- Manoj Joshi as hospital owner
- Neena Kulkarni as Madhu, Arvind's wife
- Sneha Paul as Nalini
- Maira Khan as Anjali's daughter
- Harman D'Souza
- Asrar Khan as Jeweller

== Production ==
The film was shot on location in Lucknow, Uttar Pradesh. Principal photography began on 5 June 2022. The title was selected through a social media poll and the first look poster was unveiled in June 2024.

== Release ==
The film was premiered as a ZEE5 original on 4 October 2024, following its world premiere at the Namaste Vietnam Festival 2023.

== Reception ==
Dhaval Roy of the Times of India rated the film 3.5 out of 5, describing it as "a poignant and thought-provoking film that explores the depths of human emotion and the enduring power of love. However, the film's pacing may be slow for some viewers, and the lack of major plot twists might not appeal to those seeking a fast-paced narrative. It's a worthy watch if you appreciate heartfelt storytelling, strong performances, and a nuanced exploration of human relationships." Devesh Sharma from Filmfare rates the film 3/5 stars and notes "The production values leave much to be desired. The cinematography is kind of patchy. But technical glitches aside, the film is buoyed by credible performances. It's a real tearjerker, so keep the tissues handy."

Rishabh Suri from Hindustan Times commends Anupam Kher's performance, noting that it adds depth and emotion to this remake of the Marathi film Anumati. Deepansh Duggal from Money Control rated the film 2.5/5 stars and wrote that "While The Signature isn’t a flawless film, it is an important step towards making conversations around caregivers and compassion fatigue go mainstream. The film shines when it explores the ethical and moral dilemmas around Arvind’s decision and dips when it focuses too much on melodramatic Baghban-style parent-child relationship." India Today rated the film 2/5 stars and opined "The Signature attempts to delve into the emotional and financial turmoil faced by families during medical crises. Although Anupam Kher delivers a compelling performance, the film falters due to its scattered narrative and lack of depth in execution."

Angel Rani of the Deccan Herald rated the film 1.5 stars out of 5 and wrote "It feels more like a documentary — and a dull one at that — on how society treats senior citizens. Often considered “useless” and unworthy of insurance policies." Ganesh Aaglave of Firstpost rated the film 3 out of 5 stars and highlighted "Anupam Kher is simply brilliant as he captures our attention right from the first frame. Mahima Chaudhary and Annu Kapoor provide apt support with their class acts while Ranvir Shorey makes an impact despite having a very brief role. On the whole, The Signature deserves a watch for Kher and Ahire’s sheer brilliance." Amit Bhatia of ABP Live rated the film 4/5 stars and noted "'Signature’ is not just a movie; it's an emotional journey that reminds us of the value of life and relationships. It not only makes you reflect but also reaffirms our good fortune of witnessing the brilliance of actors like Anupam Kher."

Nirali Kanabar of OTTplay rates the film 3 stars out of 5 and writes "The Signature is a film that will move you to tears. From the beginning to the end, the movie keeps you hooked to the screen despite a few bumps here and there. The film also explores the parent-child relationship as the parents grow old, the struggles that the elderly face, and society's perception of them." Risha Gangukly of Times Now rated the film 3.5 out of 5 stars and mentioned "The movie is well fleshed-out despite not even being two hours long. With emotional dramas becoming a rarity, this movie might be the best watch in some time for people who love the genre." Troy Ribeiro from the Free Press Journal rated the film 2.5/5 stars and opined "Overall, the film falls short of the deeply affecting tale it aspires to be. While it tackles weighty themes of love, loss, and healthcare, its narrative is bogged down by weak writing and forced plot devices. The result is a film that feels more concerned with ticking off emotional beats than delivering a truly heartfelt story."
