= Narendra Bhide =

Indian film score composer (1973–2020)

- Born: 1973; Mumbai, Bombay Presidency, British India
- Died: 10 December 2020 (aged 46–47)
- Occupations: Music director, composer
- Years active: 2005–present
- Awards: Maharashtra State Film Award for Best Music Director (2011)

Narendra Bhide (1973 – December 10, 2020, in Pune) was an Indian film score composer, best known for his work on the films Aandhali Koshimbir (2014), Chi Va Chi Sau Ka (2017), Hampi (2017), and Mulshi Pattern (2018). He won a Maharashtra State Film Award in 2011 in the category of Best Music Director.

== Discography ==
| Year | Film | Director | Notes |
|---|---|---|---|
| 2005 | Sarivar Sari | Gajendra Ahire | Background score |
| 2006 | Naatigothi | Gajendra Ahire | Debut as a music director |
| 2006 | Oon Paaus | Smita Talwalkar | TV series |
| 2010 | Ranbhool | Sanjay Surkar | |
| 2010 | Aaghaat | Vikram Gokhale | |
| 2011 | Hip Hip Hurray | Shriprasad Pawar, Ramesh Sharma | |
| 2011 | Paulwaat | Aditya Ingle | Maharashtra State Film Award for Best Music Director |
| 2013 | Kalam 302 | Vipin Nandurdikar | |
| 2013 | Anumati | Gajendra Ahire | |
| 2014 | Salaam | Kiran Yadnopavit | |
| 2014 | Aandhali Koshimbir | Aditya Ingle | |
| 2015 | A Paying Ghost | Sushrut Bhagwat | |
| 2015 | Bioscope | Gajendra Ahire | 3 songs only |
| 2015 | Deool Band | Pravin Tarde, Pranit Kulkarni | |
| 2016 | Shasan | Gajendra Ahire | |
| 2017 | Ranjan | Prakash Pawar | |
| 2017 | Chi Va Chi Sau Ka | Paresh Mokashi | |
| 2017 | Rudram | Bhimrao Mude | TV series |
| 2017 | Hampi | Prakash Kunte | |
| 2017 | Pimpal | Gajendra Ahire | |
| 2018 | Pushpak Vimaan | Vaibhav Chinchalkar | |
| 2018 | Take Care Good Night | Girish Joshi | |
| 2018 | Mulshi Pattern | Pravin Tarde | |
| 2019 | Sohalla | Gajendra Ahire | |
| 2019 | 66 Sadashiv | Yogesh Deshpande | |
| 2019 | Kulkarni Chaukatla Deshpande | Gajendra Ahire | |
| 2019 | Shendur | Aniket Kulthe | Short film |
| 2020 | Ladoo Ghya Ladoo | Vijay Nikam | |
| 2022 | Sarsenapati Hambirrao | Pravin Tarde | |
| 2022 | Ekdam Kadak | Ganesh Shinde, Ajay Waghmare | One song only |
