= Touring Talkies =

Touring Talkies may refer to:

- Touring Talkies (2013 film), an Indian Marathi-language drama
- Touring Talkies (2015 film), an Indian Tamil-language anthology film
