= Sri Rama Rajyam (soundtrack) =

- Album cover

Soundtrack album by Ilaiyaraaja
- Released: 15 August 2011
- Recorded: 2010–2011
- Genre: Feature film soundtrack
- Length: 50:25
- Language: Telugu
- Label: Aditya Music
- Producer: Ilaiyaraaja

Ilaiyaraaja chronology
Snehaveedu (2011)	Sri Rama Rajyam (2011)	HELLO Jai Hind! (2011)

Sri Rama Rajyam is the soundtrack to the 2011 film of the same name directed by Bapu and produced by Yalamanchali Saibabu, starring Nandamuri Balakrishna, Nayanthara, Akkineni Nageswara Rao and Srikanth. The film's musical score is composed by Ilaiyaraaja with lyrics written by Jonnavittula Ramalingeswara Rao. The album was distributed by Aditya Music and released on 15 August 2011 at a launch event held in Bhadrachalam. The music received positive reviews from critics, and Ilaiyaraaja was awarded the Nandi Award for Best Music Director. The album further received two Filmfare Awards and four Mirchi Music Awards, for the song "Jagadananda Karaka".

== Development ==
The musical score is composed by Ilaiyaraaja with lyrics provided by Jonnavittula Ramalingeswara Rao. Even before the production commenced, Ilaiyaraaja had composed eight songs for the film. Ilaiyaraaja worked on traditional Indian instruments that embodied classical music and worked on ancient melodies, so that he could translate the period of Ramayana. The tunes were composed, only after the lyrics were written. Veteran singers S. P. Balasubrahmanyam and K. S. Chithra had recorded the songs, along with Shreya Ghoshal, Tippu, Shweta Mohan, Anitha Karthikeyan, Keertana and Surabhi Sravani. Ilaiyaraaja commenced the re-recording at the Budapest Scoring Orchestra in Budapest, Hungary, and the film was delayed due to the re-recording.

== Release ==
The film's soundtrack was distributed by Aditya Music and the album was released in a soft launch at the Sita Ramachandraswamy Temple, Bhadrachalam on 15 August 2011, with Balakrishna, Bapu, Ilaiyaraaja and Sai Babu in attendance. Another launch event to distribute the audio CDs was held at the open grounds in Government Junior College, with the cast and crew. The Tamil and Malayalam versions of the soundtrack were released, a year later, with lyrics by Piraisoodan and Mankombu Gopalakrishnan respectively.

== Track listing ==
=== Telugu ===
No.	Title	Singer(s)	Length
1.	"Jagadananda Karaka"	S. P. Balasubrahmanyam, Shreya Ghoshal	5:16
2.	"Evadunnadee Lokamlo"	S. P. Balasubrahmanyam	1:32
3.	"Sitarama Charitam"	Shreya Ghoshal, Shweta Mohan	6:35
4.	"Devulle Mechchindi"	K. S. Chitra, Shreya Ghoshal	5:25
5.	"Gali Ningi Neeru"	S. P. Balasubrahmanyam	4:36
6.	"Srirama Lera"	Shreya Ghoshal, Sriram Parthasarathy	4:47
7.	"Ramayanamu"	K. S. Chitra, Shreya Ghoshal	6:30
8.	"Dandakam"	Surabhi Shravani, Keertana	1:13
9.	"Sita Shrimantam"	Shreya Ghoshal	4:59
10.	"Rama Rama"	Shweta Mohan, Anitha Karthikeyan Geetha Madhuri	4:35
11.	"Kalaya Nijama"	Tippu	1:55
12.	"Idi Pattabhi Ramuni"	Shweta Mohan	2:37
13.	"Saptashwarathamarudham"	S. P. Balasubrahmanyam	1:10
14.	"Shankuchakralu Polina"	Shweta Mohan	1:02
15.	"Mangalam Ramunaku"	Anitha Karthikeyan, Keertana	0:53
Total length:			50:25

=== Tamil ===
No.	Title	Singer(s)	Length
1.	"Jagadananda Karaka"	S. P. Balasubrahmanyam, Chinmayi	5:16
2.	"Evan Irukkar"	S. P. Balasubrahmanyam	1:32
3.	"Sitarama Charitam"	Anitha Karthikeyan, Shweta Mohan	6:35
4.	"Devargal Thittikka"	K. S. Chithra, Chinmayi	4:38
6.	"Seethaseemandham"	Chinmayi	4:59
7.	"Kanava Nijama"	Tippu	1.38
8.	"Sree Ramavaarai"	Saketh, Chinmayi	3:41
9.	"Rama Rama"	Shweta Mohan, Anitha Karthikeyan, Chinmayi	3:11
10.	"Divya Soundarya"	Anitha Karthikeyan, Keerthana	2:19
11.	"Kaatru Vaanam"	S. P. Balasubrahmanyam	0.48
12.	"Idhu Pattabhi"	Shweta Mohan	2:37
13.	"Saptashwarathamarudham"	S. P. Balasubrahmanyam	1:10
14.	"Sanguchankrangal"	Shweta Mohan	1:02
15.	"Mangalam Ramanukku"	Anitha Karthikeyan, Chinmayi	0:53
16.	"Ramayaname"	K. S. Chithra, Chinmayi	3:44
Total length:			50:25

=== Malayalam ===
No.	Title	Singer(s)	Length
1.	"Jagadananda Karaka"	Madhu Balakrishnan, Preetha P. V.	5:16
2.	"Aarundivide Ulakathil"	Madhu Balakrishnan	1:32
3.	"Sitarama Charitam"	Preetha P. V., Ranjini Jose	6:35
4.	"Devarkalikichicha"	Preetha P. V., Ranjini Jose	4:38
5.	"Ramaniduvan"	Preetha P. V., Ranjini Jose	3:41
6.	"Seethaseemandham"	K. S. Chithra	4:59
7.	"Vaayuvaanam"	Madhu Balakrishnan	4:38
8.	"Pattabhisheka"	Ganesh Sundaram	0:55
9.	"Rama Rama"	Monisha	3:11
10.	"Thambula Ragangal"	Jyotsna Radhakrishnan	2:19
11.	"Hrudutha Pathaksha"	Madhu Balakrishnan	0.48
12.	"Idhu Pattabhi Rama"	Shweta Mohan	2:37
13.	"Saptashwarathamarudham"	S. P. Balasubrahmanyam	1:10
14.	"Sanguchankrangal"	Monisha	1:02
15.	"Mangalam Raghurama"	Jyotsna Radhakrishnan	0:53
Total length:			50:25

== Reception ==
Karthik Srinivasan of Milliblog wrote "Sri Rama Rajyam is a masterpiece; totally befitting the expectations from the formidable Bapu-Raja combination". Radhika Rajamani of Rediff.com wrote "Ilaiyaraja's music is a great asset. The music is not just mellifluous to the ears with some good lyrics by Jonnavithula but is absolutely in sync with the film. Ilaiyaraja is known for his melody and he's proved he's definitely a master of melody." Serish Nanisetti of The Hindu wrote "The music by Ilayaraja is another plus point with its soothing nature".

Reviewer based at Sify noted "Music by maestro Ilayaraja is remarkable. All tunes are melodious and touch the audiences." CNN-IBN noted "Ilayaraja's music is another major attraction. Dialogues and song lyrics are so good that you do not want to miss them." However, B. V. S. Prakash of Deccan Chronicle noted "Although, music maestro Ilayaraja belts out a few chartbusters, the album is no match to the enchanting compositions of the legendary Ghantasala."

== Accolades ==
Award (Note: Awards, festivals and organizations are in alphabetical order.)	Date of ceremony (Note: Date is linked to the article about the awards held that year, wherever possible.)	Category	Recipient(s)	Result	Ref.
CineMAA Awards	17 June 2012	Best Female Playback Singer	Shreya Ghoshal – ("Jagadananda Karaka") (Note: also for "Chali Chaliga" from Mr. Perfect)	Won	
Filmfare Awards South	7 July 2012	Best Music Director – Telugu	Ilaiyaraaja	Nominated	
Filmfare Awards South	7 July 2012	Best Lyricist – Telugu	Jonnavittula Ramalingeswara Rao – ("Jagadananda Karaka")	Won	
Filmfare Awards South	7 July 2012	Best Male Playback Singer – Telugu	Tippu – ("Kalaya Nijama")	Nominated	
Filmfare Awards South	7 July 2012	Best Female Playback Singer – Telugu	Shreya Ghoshal – ("Jagadananda Karaka")	Won	
Mirchi Music Awards South	4 August 2012	Best Album of the Year	Sri Rama Rajyam	Nominated	
Mirchi Music Awards South	4 August 2012	Best Song of the Year	"Jagadananda Karaka"	Nominated	
Mirchi Music Awards South	4 August 2012	Music Composer of the Year	Ilaiyaraaja – ("Jagadananda Karaka")	Won	
Mirchi Music Awards South	4 August 2012	Lyricist of the Year	Jonnavittula Ramalingeswara Rao – ("Jagadananda Karaka")	Won	
Mirchi Music Awards South	4 August 2012	Male Vocalist of the Year	S. P. Balasubrahmanyam – ("Jagadananda Karaka")	Won	
Mirchi Music Awards South	4 August 2012	Technical – Sound Mixing of the Year	Murali – ("Jagadananda Karaka")	Won	
Nandi Awards	13 October 2012	Best Music Director	Ilaiyaraaja	Won	
South Indian International Movie Awards	21–22 June 2012	Best Music Director – Telugu	Ilaiyaraaja	Nominated	
South Indian International Movie Awards	21–22 June 2012	Best Lyricist – Telugu	Jonnavittula Ramalingeswara Rao – ("Jagadananda Karaka")	Nominated	
South Indian International Movie Awards	21–22 June 2012	Best Male Playback Singer – Telugu	S. P. Balasubrahmanyam – ("Jagadananda Karaka")	Nominated	
