= Ballu Saluja =

Indian film editor

Jaswinder Ballu Saluja
- Occupation: Editor
- Years active: 2001–present

Jaswinder Ballu Saluja is an Indian film editor who works primarily in Hindi films.

== Filmography ==
List of Ballu Saluja credits as an editor
| Year | Film | Notes |
|---|---|---|
| 2001 | Lagaan | Screen Award for Best Editing |
| 2003 | Pinjar | |
| 2004 | Hanan | |
| 2004 | Swades | |
| 2004 | Ab Tumhare Hawale Watan Sathiyo | |
| 2004 | Aabra Ka Daabra | |
| 2008 | Tulsi | |
| 2008 | Jodhaa Akbar | |
| 2008 | Thodi Life Thoda Magic | |
| 2008 | Mehbooba | |
| 2008 | Money Hai Toh Honey Hai | |
| 2008 | God Tussi Great Ho | |
| 2009 | Victory | |
| 2009 | What's Your Raashee? | |
| 2010 | Musaa: The Most Wanted | |
| 2011 | Yeh Dooriyan | |
| 2011 | Hello Jai Hind! | |
| 2012 | Tukaram | |
| 2013 | Touring Talkies | |
| 2013 | R... Rajkumar | |
| 2015 | Nilkanth Master | |
| 2016 | Do Lafzon Ki Kahani | |
| 2016 | Dangal | Screen Award for Best Editing |
| 2017 | Shaadi Mein Zaroor Aana | |
| 2018 | Paltan | |
| 2018 | Mulk | Nominated – Filmfare Award for Best Editor |
| 2019 | Looking Up | Chinese film |
| 2019 | Prassthanam | |
| 2020 | My People, My Homeland | Chinese film |
| 2020 | Shakeela | |
| 2021 | Koi Jaane Na | |
| 2021 | Thalaivii | Tamil-Hindi bilingual film |
| 2022 | Jahaan Chaar Yaar | |
| 2022 | Maarrich | |
| 2023 | Ping Pong: The Triumph | Chinese film |
| 2023 | Tiku Weds Sheru | |
