= Madhura Velankar =

Indian actress

- Born: Madhura Velankar; 8 October 1981 (age 45); Mumbai, Maharashtra
- Occupation: Actress
- Years active: 1997 – Present
- Spouse: Abhijeet Satam (m. 2010)
- Children: 1
- Relatives: Shivaji Satam (father-in-law) Pradeep Velankar (father)

Madhura Velankar (née Satam; born 8 October 1981) is an Indian actress. She appears in Hindi and Marathi films and established herself as one of Marathi cinema's leading actresses. The daughter of actor Pradeep Velankar, she made her acting debut with Gajendra Ahire's Directorial Not Only Mrs. Raut in 2003.

Starring roles in Adhantari (2004), Sarivar Sari (2005), Khabardar (2005), Matichya Chuli (2006), Gojiri (2007), Mi Amrutha Boltey (2008), Ek Daav Dhobi Pachhad (2008), Haapus (2010) established her as one of the top Marathi actresses of the decade. Madhura took a sabbatical from full time acting and worked infrequently over the next decade.

She worked in Marathi television serials also. She performed as a dancer at Rashtrapati Bhavan (Marathi Taarka), Maharashtra State Awards (performed since 2002), Zee Awards, V. Shantaram Awards, and Hirkani Awards. She has given more than 75 stage shows as a dancer and anchor.

== Early life ==
Velankar was born on 8 October 1981 in Mumbai, Maharashtra into a family associated with Marathi theatre and cinema. She is the daughter of actor Pradeep Velankar and Rajni Velankar, who worked as a schoolteacher. Her father was employed with Air India while pursuing acting alongside his professional commitments. She began acting during her Junior Kindergarten years. Her early exposure to theatre came through family activities, as her grandmother wrote stories, her mother directed them and she performed in the productions. Her mother also conducted workshops and taught at her school. She studied in the Marathi-medium education system and later attended Ramnarain Ruia College in Mumbai.

Although she grew up in a family involved in the entertainment industry, Velankar did not initially intend to pursue acting as a career. She was interested in sports and aspired to become an air hostess. She has attributed her entry into theatre partly to an injury sustained while practising rope mallakhamb, following which she participated in a play during her vacation. After completing her Class 10 examinations, she performed in a professional theatre production, where playwright Chetan Datar noticed her work and offered her a role in his play. During her college years, she participated in one-act plays and received a Best Actress award for her first college production. She continued performing in professional theatre while pursuing her education.

== Personal life ==
She married Abhijeet Satam in 2010. Her family includes father-in-law Shivaji Satam (famous for starring in Sony TV’s CID). Her father Pradeep Velankar is a Marathi actor.

== Filmography ==
| Year | Title | Role | Notes |
|---|---|---|---|
| 2003 | Not Only Mrs. Raut | Advocate Swati Dandavate | Debut film |
| 2003 | Jajantaram Mamantaram | Amori | Hindi film |
| 2004 | Adhantari | Pallavi | Maharashtra State Film Award (Special Jury Award) |
| 2005 | Khabardar | Priyanka Garvare | |
| 2005 | Sarivar Sari | Mani | |
| 2005 | Aai No. 1 | Pari | |
| 2006 | Matichya Chuli | Pooja Dandekar | |
| 2006 | Akhand Saubhagyavati | Saii | |
| 2007 | Gojiri | Gojiri | |
| 2008 | Uladhal | Priti | |
| 2008 | Mi Amruta Boltey | Amruta | |
| 2009 | Ek Daav Dhobi Pachad | Sayali | |
| 2009 | Rangiberangi | Neeta Deshpande | |
| 2009 | Made In China | Prachi | |
| 2009 | Canvas | Madhu | |
| 2010 | Haapus | Amruta Ankita | Double Role |
| 2011 | Paulwaat | Madhura | |
| 2012 | Jana Gana Mana | Malti | |
| 2013 | Ashach Eka Betavar | Ameeta | |
| 2017 | Aai Shapath | Aai | |
| 2018 | Me Shivaji Park | Meena Gavli | |
| 2019 | Ek Nirnay | Mukta | |
| 2019 | Bhai: Vyakti Ki Valli 2 | Young Vijaya Joshi | |
| 2022 | Goshta Eka Paithanichi | Akkasaheb | |
| 2023 | Butterfly | Megha | Nominated - Zee Chitra Gaurav Puraskar for Best Actress |
| 2024 | Alibaba Aani Chalishitale Chor | Shalaka | |

=== Television ===
- Mrunmayi (Zee Marathi)
- Chakravyuha (Zee TV)
- Saanj Sawlya (ETV Marathi)
- Aaplach Ghar (ETV Marathi)
- Saata Janmachya Gaathi (ETV Marathi)
- Anamika (ETV Marathi) (Best Actress, Sanskritik Kala Darpan)
- Ladhai Dahavichi (ETV Marathi)
- Aata Bolana (ETV Marathi)
- Star Best Sellers (Star Plus)
- Rishtey (Zee TV)
- Surmai Shaam (ETV Marathi)
- Spandan (ETV Marathi)
- Tumchi Mulgi Kay Karte? (Sony Marathi)
- Aajchi Nayika (Zee Marathi)

=== Plays ===
- Lagnabambaal
- Mr & Mrs
- Ha Shekhar Khosla Kon Aahe?

=== Telefilms ===
- Aham
- Sur Julta Julta (Etv)
- Daav Songaticha

=== Documentary Films ===
- Maharashtra Paryatan Vibhaag

=== Short films ===
- Midnight
- Suicide
- Tyre Ki Hawa Puncture Gayi saab (International award winner)
- Aai Shapat, winner of The Perfect 10 at The Mumbai Film Festival

== Awards and nominations ==
| Award | Year | Category | Nominated work | Result | Ref(s) |
|---|---|---|---|---|---|
| Maharashtra State Film Awards | 2004 | Maharashtra State Film Award (Special Jury Award) | Not Only Mrs. Raut | Won | |
| Maharashtra State Film Awards | 2005 | Maharashtra State Film Award (Special Jury Award) | Adhantari | Won | |
| Maharashtracha Favourite Kon? | 2008 | MFK Award for Favourite Actress | Uladhal | Nominated | |
| Maharashtracha Favourite Kon? | 2010 | MFK Award for Favourite Actress | Haapus | Nominated | |
| Zee Chitra Gaurav Puraskar | 2024 | Zee Chitra Gaurav Puraskar for Best Actress | Butterfly | Nominated | |

== See also ==
- List of Marathi film actresses
