= Maza Agadbam =

- Theatrical release poster
- Directed by: Trupti Bhoir
- Written by: Story and Screenplay: Trupti Bhoir; Sheikh Dawood G Dialogue: Hrishikesh Koli
- Produced by: Trupti Bhoir; T Satish Chakravarthy; Dhawal Jayantilal Gada; Akshay Jayantilal Gada
- Starring: Subodh Bhave; Trupti Bhoir
- Cinematography: Arun Varma
- Edited by: Ballu Saluja
- Music by: T Satish Chakravarthy
- Production companies: Trupti Bhoir Films; Pen Studios
- Release date: 26 October 2018
- Running time: 130 minutes
- Country: India
- Language: Marathi

Maza Agadbam is a 2018 Indian Marathi-language comedy drama film directed by Trupti Bhoir and produced by Pen Studios. It is a sequel of 2010 film Agadbam. The film was theatrically released on 26 October 2018.

== Plot ==
Nazuka wants to fulfill her fathers dream by defeating wrestlers all over the world and make name for herself and her state Maharashtra.

== Cast ==
- Subodh Bhave as Rayba
- Trupti Bhoir as Najuka
- Usha Nadkarni as Rayba's Mother
- Tanaji Galgunde as Vajne
- Jaywant Wadkar Najuka's Father
- Peter Smith as The Wolf
- Mike Wietecha as Yamaha
- Yaser Yazdani

== Release ==
Maza Agadbam was theatrically released on 26 October 2018.

== Soundtrack ==
Maza Agadbam

Soundtrack album by T Satish Chakravarthy
- Released: 2018
- Genre: Feature film soundtrack
- Length: 29:10
- Language: Marathi
- Label: Zee Music Company

Official audio
- Maza Agadbam - Full Album on YouTube

Music is given by T Satish Chakravarthy.

Track listing
No.	Title	Lyrics	Singer (s)	Length
1.	"Aasmaan Ka"	Mangesh Kangane	Apeksha Dandekar, Ajivasan Kids Choir	2:31
2.	"Preeti Sumane"	Mangesh Kangane	Shreya Ghoshal, T Satish Chakravarthy	3:20
3.	"Hil Hil Pori"	Mandar Cholkar	Tarannum Malik, T Satish Chakravarthy	3:15
4.	"Haluwara"	Mangesh Kangane	Shreya Ghoshal	5:11
5.	"Atak Matak"	Mandar Cholkar	Anand Shinde	1:50
6.	"Na Maya Na Vidya"	Mangesh Kangane	Adarsh Shinde	3:12
7.	"Haluwara (Male)"	Mangesh Kangane	T Satish Chakravarthy	5:12
Total length:				29:10

== Reception ==
Professional ratings
Review scores
Source	Rating
The Times of India	2.0/5 stars
Maharashtra Times	2.0/5 stars
Cinestaan	4.0/5 stars
