= Swami Public Ltd. =

- Theatrical release poster
- स्वामी पब्लिक लि.
- Directed by: Gajendra Ahire
- Written by: Gajendra Ahire
- Produced by: Poonam Shende
- Starring: Subodh Bhave; Vikram Gokhale; Chinmay Mandlekar; Vinay Apte; Neena Kulkarni; Milind Shinde; Savita Malpekar; Mukta Patwardhan; Bharat GaneshPure; Vinod Khedkar; Vinod Satav; Saunskruti Kher
- Cinematography: Vikram Amaladi
- Music by: Uttam Singh
- Distributed by: Saarrthi Entertainment
- Release date: 28 November 2014
- Running time: 104 Minutes
- Country: India
- Language: Marathi

Swami Public Ltd. (Marathi: स्वामी पब्लिक लि.) is a 2014 Indian Marathi film starring Vikram Gokhale, Subodh Bhave, Chinmay Mandlekar late Vinay Apte in lead roles. The film is written & directed by Gajendra Ahire, produced by Poonam Shende under the banner Saarrthi Entertainment.

== Plot ==
Siddharth (Chinmay Mandlekar) is a simpleton and socially aware young man. Having been brought up by his grandmother (Neena Kulkarni), he completes his MSW to work for social causes. However, he is taken onthis path by a shrewd businessman Nachiket (Subodh Bhave). Nachiket is a master in marketing and packaging of ideas and concepts. Having understood this need of mental support by the masses, launches Siddharth as a Swami. Systematic & strategic planning, excellent communication and with perfect marketing, this Swami becomes a Brand.

== Cast ==
- Chinmay Mandlekar as Siddharth/Swami
- Subodh Bhave as Nachiket
- Vikram Gokhale
- Vinay Apte
- Milind Shinde

== Release ==
The film will be releasing all over the Maharashtra on 28 November 2014.

== Soundtrack ==
Music of the film was composed by renowned music composer Uttam Singh, with lyrics penned by Gajendra Ahire & Ajay Chakravarty. The background music was scored by Chaitanya Adkar.

Swami Public Ltd.

Soundtrack album by Uttam Singh
- Genre: Feature film soundtrack
- Language: Marathi

No.	Title	Singer(s)	Length
1	"Chahe Kusumbi Chola Pehanoo"	Ajay Chakravarty	
2	"Main Nahi Janata"	Sukhvinder Singh	
3	"Tujhya Chandanyanna"	Prasenjit Kosambi	
