= Dilli Gang =

2013 film

- Directed by: Ashish Tyagi
- Written by: Rajeshwar Tyagi
- Screenplay by: Rajeshwar Tyagi
- Produced by: Rajeshwar Tyagi
- Starring: Darshan Jariwala; Neena Kulkarni; Yashpal Sharma; Aamir Dalvi; Asif Basra; Asif Ali
- Cinematography: Shakeel Abbas Khan
- Edited by: Mansoor Azmi
- Music by: Various Artists
- Production company: Radha Creations
- Distributed by: Radha Creations
- Release date: 25 October 2013
- Running time: 96 minutes
- Country: India
- Language: Hindi

Dilli Gang (transl. Delhi gang) is a 2013 Indian crime film directed by Ashish Tyagi and produced by Rajeshwar Tyagi under the Radha Creations banner. The film was released on 25 October 2013.

== Cast ==
- Darshan Jariwala as Ishambar Prasad
- Neena Kulkarni as Sujata
- Yashpal Sharma as Inspector
- Aamir Dalvi
- Asif Basra
- Asif Ali

== Plot ==
Dilli Gang is the story of an old man targeted by a dangerous gang which preys on senior citizens living alone. The film is based on true incidents of increasing murders of aged men and women staying alone in metropolitan cities.

== Soundtrack ==
No.	Title	Singer(s)	Length
1.	"Jo Tum Pe Deewane The"	Kapil Sibal
2.	"Tamam Umr Ka Rishta"	Javed Ali
3.	"Bangda Shangda Paloji"	Mika Singh
4.	"Dil Ye Hua Palchhin"	Siddhant Madhav Mishra

== Reception ==
Dilli Gang received generally negative reviews from critics. The film was one of the worst movie of 2013. Faheem Ruhani of India Today stated, "Even competent actors such as Jariwala, Kulkarni, Sharma and Dalvi cannot lift this film in which the germ of idea is good one but its execution is rather poor. May be this film sounded great on paper to the above four acting talents. Sadly, none of it shows on screen."
