= Maharashtra State Film Award (Special Jury Award) =

Indian film award

Maharashtra State Film's Special Jury Award
- Awarded for: Special appearance of an actor in a Marathi film
- Sponsored by: Maharashtra State Film Awards
- Final award: 2023

The Maharashtra State Film's Special Jury Award for Special Appearance of an actor is presented annually at the Maharashtra State Film Awards of India to an actor for their performance in a Marathi film.

== Winners and nominees ==
List of award recipients, showing the year, role(s) and film(s)
Year	Photos of winners	Recipient(s)	Role(s)	Work(s)	Refs.
1999		Mohan Joshi	Annasaheb	Gharabaher	
1999		Sukanya Kulkarni	Vishwas Salunkhe's fiance	Sarkarnama	
2001		Madhu Kambikar		Aai Kulswamini Tuljabhavani	
2002		Madhu Kambikar		Sangharsh Jeevanacha	
2003		Madhura Velankar	Adv. Swati Dandavate	Not Only Mrs. Raut	
2004		Sandeep Kulkarni		Adhantari	
2004		Madhura Velankar	Pallavi	Adhantari	
2005		Atul Kulkarni	Shesh Desai	Devrai	
2005		Sharvari Jamenis	Neha	Kaydyacha Bola	
2006		Devika Daftardar	Dr. Neeraja Kaushik	Nital	
2007		Chitra Navathe		Tingya	
2007		Sadashiv Amrapurkar	Gayatri's father	Kadachit	
2008		Nandu Madhav	Dadasaheb Phalke	Harishchandrachi Factory	
2009		Prasad Oak	P. Das	Ti Ratra	
2009		Kadambari Kadam	Sangeeta Pradhan	Aaghaat	
2011		Suhas Shirsat	Audya	Gajaar: Journey of the Soul	
2011		Jyoti Chandekar		Paulvat	
2012		Nandu Madhav	Joshi's Father	Shala	
2012		Umesh Kamat	Ramchandra Dhaigude	Parees	
2012		Hemangi Kavi	Nanda	Pipani	
2013		Mohan Joshi		Rangkarmi	
2013		Samidha Guru	Jyoti	Kapus Kondyachi Goshta	
2014		Hrishikesh Joshi	Sadanand Kulkarni	Poshter Boyz	
2014		Usha Naik	Budhi	Ek Hazarachi Note	
2014		Smita Tambe	Shabana	Candle March	
2015		Smita Tambe		Partu	
2016		Chhaya Kadam	Chhaya	Redu	
2018		Firoz Shaikh		Tendlya	
2018		Gauri Mahajan	Smita	Pushpak Vimaan	
2023		Bhargav Pratap	Mani Lokhande	Naal 2	
2023		Sujay Dahake	-	Shyamchi Aai	
2023		Amruta Rao	-	Shyamchi Aai	
