= Abhidnya Bhave =

Indian actress

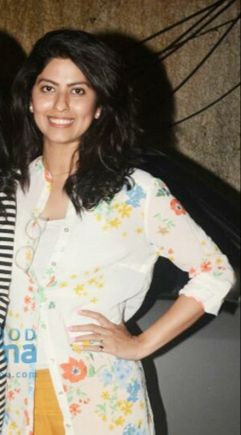
- Born: 13 March 1989 (age 37); Vasai-Virar, Maharashtra, India
- Occupations: Actor; Entrepreneur
- Years active: 2010–present
- Spouses: Varun Vaitikar (m. 2014; div. 2016) Mehul Pai (m. 2020)

Abhidnya Bhave (born 13 March 1989) is an Indian actress, who acts in Marathi, Hindi television and films. She debuted in 2011 with Love U Zindagi. She portrayed Monika in Khulta Kali Khulena in 2016. She was seen in Tula Pahate Re as Mayra. She co-owns a fashion brand with Tejaswini Pandit named Tejadnya

== Early life ==
Abhidnya Bhave was born on 13 March 1989 to parents Uday & Hemangi Bhave (school teacher by profession). She was brought up in Vasai-Virar, Mumbai.

== Personal life ==
Bhave married Varun Vaitikar in 2014; they divorced in 2016. In 2020, she married Mehul Pai, who is an entrepreneur.

== Career ==
Abhidnya Bhave has worked in the Marathi-language serial Khulta Kali Khulena on Zee Marathi where she played a negative and has also worked in serial Lagori - Maitri Returns (Star Pravah). She has also worked in a Web series "Moving Out". Bhave worked with Zee Marathi's TV Show "Tula Pahate Re" starring Subodh Bhave & Gayatri Datar. Bhave co-owns a fashion brand with Tejaswini Pandit named Tejadnya. She was also seen in a Colors TV sitcom Bawara Dil starring Aditya Redij and Kinjal Dhamecha where she made a cameo appearance.

== Filmography ==
=== Television ===
Year	TV serial	Role	Language	Channel	Ref.
2010	Pyaar Kii Ye Ek Kahaani	Cameo	Hindi	Star One	
2011	Love U Zindagi	Samyukta	Hindi	StarPlus	
2014	Bade Achhe Lagte Hain	Cameo	Hindi	SET	
2014-2015	Lagori – Maitri Returns	Mukta Vikram Raut	Marathi	Star Pravah	
2016	Devyani	Veena	Marathi	Star Pravah	
2016-2017	Khulta Kali Khulena	Monica Dalvi	Marathi	Zee Marathi	
2018	Katti Batti	Anushka	Marathi	Zee Yuva	
2018-2019	Tula Pahate Re	Myra Karkhanis	Marathi	Zee Marathi	
2018	Maharashtracha Favorite Dancer	Contestant	Marathi	Sony Marathi	
2020	Rang Majha Vegla	Tanuja Mantri	Marathi	Star Pravah	
2019-2020	Chala Hawa Yeu Dya : Shelibrity Pattern	Contestant	Marathi	Zee Marathi	
2021	Bawara Dil	Jhanvi	Hindi	Colors TV	
2022-2023	Tu Tevha Tashi	Pushpavalli Patwardhan	Marathi	Zee Marathi	
2023-2024	Baatein Kuch Ankahee Si	Anagha Karmarkar	Hindi	StarPlus	
2025-present	Tarini	Kaushiki Khandekar	Marathi	Zee Marathi	

=== Films ===
Year	Title	Language	Role	Ref.
2012	Langar	Marathi	Cameo	
2023	Jaggu Ani Juliet	Marathi	Mrs. Gupte	
2025	Jantar Mantar ChuMantar	Marathi		
