= Postcard (2013 film) =

2014 Indian Marathi film

- Directed by: Gajendra Ahire
- Screenplay by: Gajendra Ahire
- Produced by: Vinay Waman Ganu
- Starring: Girish Kulkarni
- Cinematography: Yogesh Rajguru
- Edited by: Mayur Hardas
- Music by: Gandhar Sangoram
- Release dates: 23 December 2013 (Goa Film Festival); 25 April 2014
- Running time: 116 minutes
- Country: India
- Language: Marathi

Postcard is a 2013 Indian Marathi film written and directed by Gajendra Ahire. It is about a postman who gets involved in the lives of people.

== Synopsis ==
The film opens with a postman in Maharashtra. He tells three stores about his life.

The first story is about an old man who has worked all his life at a saw mill. The postman regularly brings him letters from his children. The postman's pregnant wife reads some of the letters. She believes they are not merely letters; they carry messages and emotions. To the postman the letters are merely his job. He delivers letters and sometimes read them aloud when the recipient cannot read. One day the old man decides to retire from his job and go live peacefully with his children. He asks the owner of the saw mill to settle his dues. The owner, shrewd and deceitful, says the old man is due nothing; in fact the old man must repay his loans, now with interest totaling one thousand rupees. The old man decides he will repay the loan by working it off, and then leave with a clean account. At the end of the month the owner reports that the old man's work just covers the interest accrued in that month. The old man realizes that the loan is usurious; he will not be able to pay it off by working. The old man writes a letter to God. He writes that he has lived an honest life and if God has created a righteous world then God must send him the thousand rupees so he can leave with honor. The postman's wife reads this letter and decides to send the old man her savings, seven hundred rupees. The postman delivers the money but is insufficient and the old man must return to work. A few days later the old man dies at the saw mill. In his last letter, to God, he asks why God has created wicked men like the postman who cruelly stole three hundred rupees from the thousand rupees God had sent him. The postman sorrowfully reads this letter to his wife.

Some years later the postman was assigned to a hill station. His second story is about his job at that hill station. One of his daily tasks is to incinerate letters which cannot be delivered or returned. The postman's wife has gone to her own village to deliver their second child. The postman sometimes reads the dead letters before he incinerates them. One such letter, which arrives frequently, is from a woman to a man, probably her husband. One day when the postman is about to enter a school he is stopped by a man at the school gate. The man introduces himself; the postman recognizes his name immediately as the recipient of the woman's letters. The man hands the postman a letter addressed to the frequent letter writer who, says the man, is his daughter. The man implores the postman to deliver it promptly and directly to his daughter. He is a soldier. He wants to see his daughter. He must see her today because tomorrow he must return to his duty, far away. The postman brings his letter to the school matron. There is no such girl at the school. The matron searches the old registers and uncovers that the girl had graduated and left the school many years ago. They come to the gate but the father has vanished. On the following day the soldier meets the postman again. This time he tells the postman a story. Many years ago, he traveled home to see his daughter at her school. His bus had accidentally tumbled into a valley and everyone (including him) was killed. He only wants to see his daughter. Now the postman realizes that the soldier is a ghost. The postman sets about tracking down the daughter. She runs a bar. The postman meets her and tells her the story. At first she laughs but she gradually realizes, to her shock and grief, that the story is true. She had thought her father had abandoned her. She realizes her father has died, today, because the postman brought her the news. She breaks down and curses at the postman and drives him away.

The third story is about the postman's job at another village. Every day a woman calls out to him, qasim, the bringer of news. She asks, always eagerly, if he has a letter from her lover and sometimes when there is a letter she is overjoyed. She is a dancing girl, a nautch girl. One day her lover comes to see her. He leaves the following morning; he promises to take her with him the next time. He writes letters and, some weeks later, visits her again. She wants to go with him. He says it is not possible today. There is a loud fight. He exclaims that money is required to buy her freedom before he can take her away; he does not have the money yet. Some days later the postman sees a medicine man on the roadside. The medicine man has a mask, a wooden face mask, for sale. It is charmed and it can grant wishes, says the medicine man. The postman recognizes the mask immediately; it was made by the old man of the saw mill as a present for his grandchild. The postman remembers the same mask hanging on the wall of the bar. The medicine man says it costs three hundred rupees. The postman recalls the soldier's daughter had quoted the same sum when the postman had asked about the mask at the bar. The postman contemplates buying the mask but decides not to meddle with forces that may be beyond him. Some days later he finds the dancing girl has bought the mask. That night she wishes it to bring her money so she can buy her freedom and join her lover. In a few days the postman brings her a large sum of money and a letter from her lover's firm. Her lover was caught in the machinery and was mangled to death; this is insurance money which he had willed to her. The postman is disturbed by the turn of events. He leaves the village to his next posting. He sees the girl, now pale and dreadful, going to return the mask.

The film ends when the postman and his family board the bus to his next job. The soldier appears on the bus, smiling and giving sweets to the postman's daughter.

== Cast ==
- Girish Kulkarni as The Postman
- Dilip Prabhavalkar as Bhikaji Kale
- Vibhawari Deshpande as Lisa Kamble
- Radhika Apte as the Gulzar
- Subodh Bhave as Vishwanath
- Kishor Kadam as James Kamble
- Sai Tamhankar as Jaya, Postman's wife

== Awards and nominations ==
- Filmfare Marathi Awards
  - Critics Best Film - Won (along with Elizabeth Ekadashi)
  - Best Actor - Girish Kulkarni - Nominated
  - Best Cinematography - Yogesh Rajguru - Nominated
  - Best Dialogue - Gajendra Ahire - Nominated
  - Best Background Score - Chaitanya Adkar - Nominated
  - Best Sound Design - Tushar Pandit - Nominated
