= Usha Nadkarni =

Indian actress (born 1946)

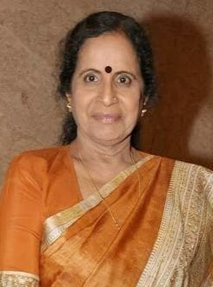
- Nadkarni in 2021
- Born: Usha Kalbag; 27 May 1946 (age 80); Bombay, Bombay Province, British India
- Occupation: Actress
- Years active: 1979–present
- Spouse: Ravindra Nadkarni (m. 1972, separated)
- Children: 1

Usha Nadkarni (née Kalbag; born 27 May 1946) is an Indian actress. She predominantly works in Hindi and Marathi industry. She is best known for her role of Savita Deshmukh in the show Pavitra Rishta.

She participated as a contestant on the Marathi version of Bigg Boss in 2018, becoming one of the oldest contestants to participate in the show. In 2015, she starred in a stage show, Londoncharya Aajibai by Rajiv Joshi, playing the community leader Aajibai Banarase.

== Early life ==
Usha Nadkarni was born on 27 May 1946 as Usha Kalbag. She loved acting since childhood and often took part in cultural events during public Ganesh festivals. However, her mother opposed her pursuit of a career in acting. She started her career in BMC for 9 years and then as a banker in Dena Bank for 25 years.

== Personal life ==
She married Ravindra Nadkarni in the early 70's. After a few years of marriage, they separated. They have a son together.

== Filmography ==
=== Films ===
Year	Film	Role	Language
1979	Sinhasan	Shanta	Marathi
1984	Hech Mazha Maher	Ganga Maushi	Marathi
1986	Musafir	Parvati Pillai	Hindi
1987	Pratighaat	Laxmi's mother-in-law	Hindi
1987	Sadak Chhap	Mai, Blind women	Hindi
1987	Purna Satya	Dr. Ashmita	Marathi
1988	Nashibwan	Bairubai	Marathi
1990	Dhumakul	Maushi	Marathi
1990	Ghanchakkar	Maushi	Marathi
1991	Narsimha	Mrs. Rastogi	Hindi
1991	Love	Guest at Prithvi's show	Hindi
1991	Hafta Bandh	Poor Woman	Hindi
1991	Lakshmanrekha	Madhav's wife	Hindi
1991	Jasa Baap Tashi Pore	Kalavati Savkar	Marathi
1991	Dhadakmaar	Usha	Marathi
1991	Bandalbaaz	Kaikayi Devi	Marathi
1991	Maherchi Saadi	Laxmi's mother-in-law	Marathi
1992	Nishpaap	Kusum Gaikwad	Marathi
1993	Shatranj	Mrs. Verma	Hindi
1994	Purush	Ambika's mother	Hindi
1995	Jamla Ho Jamla	Leela Aatya	Marathi
1995	Gundaraj	Parvati Chauhan	Hindi
1996	Tu Chor Main Sipahi	Daadi	Hindi
1997	Yeshwant	Slum dweller woman	Hindi
1999	Vaastav: The Reality	Dedh Footiya's mother	Hindi
1999	Nirmala Machindra Kamble	Yashwantrao's wife	Marathi
2001	Gang	Gangu's mother	Hindi
2001	Yeh Tera Ghar Yeh Mera Ghar	Saraswati's mother	Hindi
2002	Hathyar	Dedh Footiya's mother	Hindi
2003	Praan Jaye Par Shaan Na Jaye	Suvarna	Hindi
2003	Patth	Avinash's mother	Hindi
2004	Krishna Cottage	Disha's Mom	Hindi
2005	Pak Pak Pakaak	Gaurakka	Marathi
2006	Aai Mala Maaf Kar	Usha's mother	Marathi
2007	Soon Majhi Bhagyachi	Sasu	Marathi
2008	One Two Three	Kanta	Hindi
2008	Urus	Mother	Hindi
2008	Sakhi	Kundatai	Marathi
2010	Agadbam	Raiba's mother	Marathi
2010	Kalshetkar Aahet Ka?	Kaminibai Sangle	Marathi
2010	Huppa Huiyya	Renuka Aaji	Marathi
2010	Bhairu Pehelwan Ki Jai Ho	Bhairu's mother	Marathi
2011	Deool	Sarpanch's mother-in-law	Marathi
2012	Matter	Sulbhatai	Marathi
2013	R... Rajkumar	Old Lady	Hindi
2014	Yellow	Gauri's classmate's mother	Marathi
2014	Bhoothnath Returns	Lolita Singh	Hindi
2015	Janiva	Mrs D'Souza	Marathi
2015	Vakratunda Mahakaaya	Papad seller	Marathi
2015	Slambook	Sumi Ajji	Marathi
2016	Rustom	Rustom's maid	Hindi
2016	Great Grand Masti	Amar's mother-in-law	Hindi
2016	Ventilator	Akka	Marathi
2018	Jaane Kyun De Yaaron	Aaji	Hindi
2018	Yeh Kaisa Tigdam	Barrod's mother	Hindi
2018	Kadke Kamal Ke	Usha Tai	Hindi
2018	Maza Agadbam	Raiba's mother	Marathi
2018	Love Training	Aai	Marathi
2022	Adrushya	Old Lady	Marathi
2022	Love Jaisa Pyaar	Rajan's grandmother	Hindi
2023	Global Aadgaon	Mankaji	Marathi
2025	Fussclass Dabhade	Shanta Akka	Marathi
2025	Mukkam Post Devach Ghar	Sarpanch Aaji	Marathi
2026	Gandhi Talks	Mahadev's mother	Sound
2026	Ladki Bahin	Shital Tai Shinde	Marathi
2026	Tumbadchi Manjula	Aaji	Marathi
2026	The Maharashtra Files	Janabai Rathod	Marathi

=== Television ===
Year	Show	Character	Channel	Language	Ref.
1994-1998	Anhonee - Zee Horror Show	Episodic Role	Zee TV	Hindi	
1999-2001	Rishtey	Episodic role	Zee TV	Hindi	
2003	Vadalvaat		Zee Marathi	Marathi	
2004	Kumkum - Ek Pyara Sa Bandhan	Viju	Star Plus	Hindi	
2006–2007	Thodi Si Zameen Thoda Sa Aasmaan	Girija	Star Plus	Hindi	
2007–2008	Virrudh	Nani	Sony TV	Hindi	
2007–2008	Kuchh Is Tara	Shanta Tai	Sony TV	Hindi	
2009–2014	Pavitra Rishta	Savita Damodar Deshmukh	Zee TV	Hindi	
2012	Kairee	Narrator	Colors TV	Hindi	
2012	Madhubala - Ek Ishq Ek Junoon	Mrs. Dixit (Mukund's mother)	Colors TV	Hindi	
2013	Mrs. Pammi Pyarelal	Kamini Faujdar Dadi	Colors TV	Hindi	
2013	Bh Se Bhade	Inspector Usha Shinde	Zee TV	Hindi	
2015	Rishton Ka Mela	Mela (Fare)'s owner	Zee TV	Hindi	
2016-2017	Khulta Kali Khulena	Parvati Dalvi (Aajji)	Zee Marathi	Marathi	
2016	Nakushi Tarihi Havihavishi		Star Pravah	Marathi	
2018	Bigg Boss Marathi 1	Contestant (Evicted on Day 77)	Colors Marathi	Marathi	
2019	Khatra Khatra Khatra	Herself (Guest)	Colors TV	Hindi	
2019	Ghadge & Suun	Aau Ghadge	Colors Marathi	Marathi	
2019-2020	Molkarin Bai – Mothi Tichi Savali	Durga	Star Pravah	Marathi	
2022	Bus Bai Bas	Guest	Zee Marathi	Marathi	
2022-2023	Ase He Sundar Amche Ghar	Narayani Rajpatil	Sony Marathi	Marathi	
2023	Premas Rang Yave	Aau	Sun Marathi	Marathi	
2023-2024	Kaise Mujhe Tum Mil Gaye	Dnyaneshwari Chitnis	Zee TV	Hindi	
2025	Celebrity Masterchef India	Contestant (7th place)	Sony TV	Hindi	

== Awards ==
Year	Award	Category	Character	Show
2011	Zee Gold Awards	Best Actor In A Negative Role(Female)	Savita Deshmukh	Pavitra Rishta
2011	BIG Television Awards	Favorite Teekha Character	Savita Deshmukh	Pavitra Rishta
2012	Zee Gold Awards	Best Actress In A Negative Role (Critics)	Savita Deshmukh	Pavitra Rishta
2016	Zee Marathi Utsav Natyancha Awards 2016	Best Character Female	Parvati Aaji	Khulta Kali Khulena

== See also ==
- List of Indian film actresses
