= Bhagyashree Mote =

Indian actress

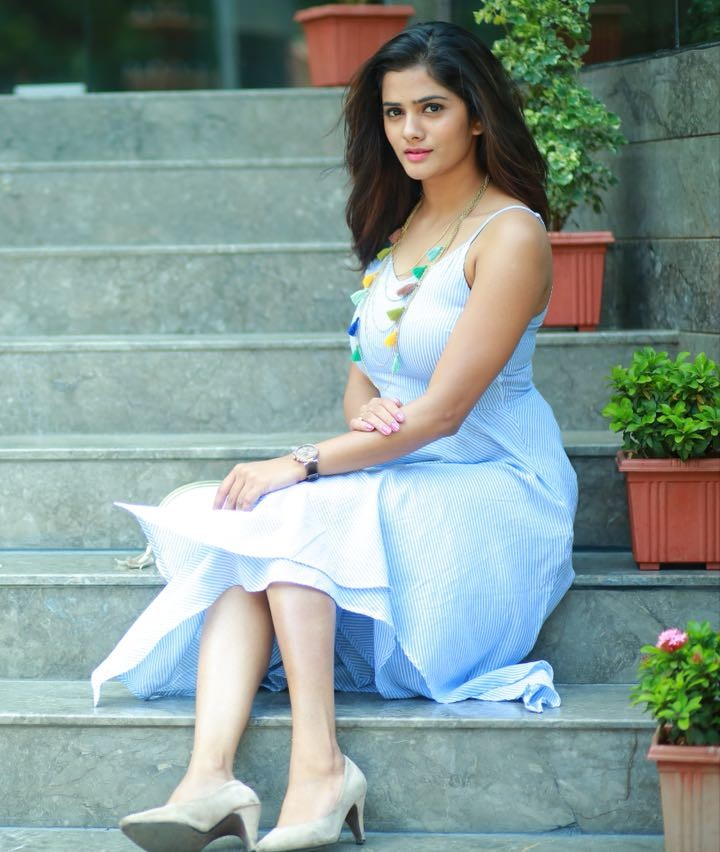
- Born: Pune, Maharashtra, India
- Occupation: Actress
- Years active: 2011–present
- Known for: Devyani

Bhagyashree Mote is an Indian film and television actress. She mainly works in Marathi films and Hindi television shows and also appeared in Telugu film once.

== Early life and career ==
She is originally from Pune, Maharashtra but now lives in Mumbai. She has degree in Economics. She is known for her performance in Devon Ke Dev...Mahadev and Siya Ke Ram. Her marathi debut was with the Devyani serial. At the college, she acted in commercial plays like Vishwagarjana. She was also seen in a Telugu movie.

Bhagyashree Mote first appeared in the Marathi music video Jhakaas Tu (2014), opposite singer-songwriter Vaibhav Londhe, who wrote, composed, and sang the track. The song's visuals highlighted traditional Maharashtrian sari culture and feminine elegance.

== Filmography ==
- Note: all films are in Marathi, unless otherwise noted.

| Year | Title | Role | Notes | Ref(s) |
|---|---|---|---|---|
| 2011 | Shodhu Kuthe | | Debut | |
| 2013 | Mumbai Mirror | Bar dancer | | |
| 2017 | Kaay Re Rascalaa | Vaijanti | | |
| 2018 | Patil | Pushpa | | |
| 2018 | Majhya Baikocha Priyakar | | | |
| 2019 | Chikati Gadilo Chithakotudu | Kavya | Telugu film | |
| 2019 | Shree Kamdev Prasanna | | | |
| 2020 | Vitthal | | | |
| 2021 | Bhavai | Pyaari | Hindi film | |
| 2022 | Ekdam Kadak | | | |
| 2025 | Jantar Mantar ChuMantar | | | |

== Television ==
| Year | Title | Role | Channel | Language | Ref. |
|---|---|---|---|---|---|
| 2013 | Devon Ke Dev...Mahadev | Cameo appearance | Life OK | Hindi | |
| 2014 | Devyani | Devyani Sawant | Star Pravah | Marathi | |
| 2015 | Siya Ke Ram | Shurpanakha | StarPlus | Hindi | |
| 2015 | Jodha Akbar | Cameo appearance | Zee TV | Hindi | |
| 2016 | Prem He... | Episodic role | Zee Yuva | Marathi | |
| 2020 | Jai Deva Shree Ganesha | Parvati Devi | Star Pravah | Marathi | |

== Music Videos ==
| Year | Title | Language | Notes | Ref. |
|---|---|---|---|---|
| 2014 | Jhakaas Tu | Marathi | | |
| 2019 | Jeev Majha Jaeel | Marathi | | |
