= Kulkarni Chaukatla Deshpande =

Marathi language drama film

- First look poster
- Directed by: Gajendra Ahire
- Written by: Gajendra Ahire
- Produced by: Smita Vinay Ganu
- Starring: Sai Tamhankar; Rajesh Shringarpure
- Cinematography: Krishna Soren
- Edited by: Suchitra Sathe
- Music by: Narendra Bhide
- Production company: Smita Film Production
- Distributed by: AA Films
- Release date: 22 November 2019
- Country: India
- Language: Marathi

Kulkarni Chaukatla Deshpande is an Indian Marathi language drama film written and directed by Gajendra Ahire and produced by Smita Vinay Ganu under the banner of Smita Film Production. The film is co produced by Ajit Madhavrao Potdar and Seema Niranjan Alpe. The film stars Sai Tamhankar in title role of 'Kulkarni Chaukatla Deshpande', who is a rebellious middle-class girl, the film focuses on her relationships and unfolds the journey of different relations on the path of her life. The film also features Rajesh Shringarpure, Nikhil Ratnparkhi and Neena Kulkarni in pivotal role. The film was released on 22 November 2019.

== Synopsis ==
Jaya (Sai Tamhankar) scripts a new life for herself after walking out on marriage, challenging outdated norms that a woman should abide by in a marriage. She finds love and a career in Mumbai but faces a new set of challenges when their kids find it difficult to accept their courtship.

== Cast ==
- Sai Tamhankar as Jaya
- Rajesh Shringarpure as Satish
- Nikhil Ratnaparkhi as Jaya's ex-husband
- Rohan Shah
- Narendra Bhide
- Soumil Shringarpure
- Neena Kulkarni as Jaya's mother

== Release ==
Kulkarni Chaukatla Deshpande was released theatrically on 22 November 2019.

== Soundtrack ==
Kulkarni Chaukatla Deshpande

Soundtrack album by Gajendra Ahire, Chaitanya Aadkar, Siddharth & Soumil, Nagendra bhide, Cyli Khare.
- Released: 2019
- Genre: Feature film soundtrack
- Length: 25:14

Music of the film is composed by Gajendra Ahire and Chaitanya Aadkar, Siddharth & Soumil, Narendra Bhide, Cyli Khare with lyrics are penned by Gajendra Ahire.

=== Track listing ===
No.	Title	Lyrics	Music	Singer(s)	Length
1.	"Sundara"	Gajendra Ahire	Gajendra Ahire, Chaitanya Aadkar	Ajay Gogavale	2:58
2.	"Aabhalachya Gavala"	Gajendra Ahire	Soumil & Sidharth	Sunidhi Chauhan	3:58
3.	"Andharachi gaadi"	Cyli Khare	Cyli Khare	Cyli Khare	4:22
4.	"Rangaari"	Gajendra Ahire	Sidharth & Soumil	Shreya Ghoshal	4:11
5.	"Junya Pustakana"	Gajendra Ahire	Nagendra Bhide	Shruti Athawale	4:04
6.	"Aabhalachya Gavala Reprise"	Gajendra Ahire	Siddharth & Soumil	Shankar Mahadevan	5:51
Total length:					25:14
