= Shevri =

- Directed by: Gajendra Ahire
- Written by: Gajendra Ahire
- Produced by: Neena Kulkarni
- Starring: Neena Kulkarni; Dilip Prabhavalkar; Ravindra Mankani
- Cinematography: Imtiaz Bargir
- Edited by: Zafar Sultan
- Music by: Narendra Bhide
- Release date: 2006
- Country: India
- Language: Marathi

Shevri is a Marathi film made in 2006. The film is directed by Gajendra Ahire and produced by Neena Kulkarni.

== Plot ==
Vidya Barve, is a divorced, working woman, sharing a rented flat with a roommate in Mumbai. Our film deals with one single night which Vidya is forced to spend on the streets of this city. As she ambles on the deserted roads waiting for morning, she's frightened, lonely, angry, confused. She keeps recalling her relationships as they stand today - Her estranged husband, her teenaged son staying with her mother in small town Nasik, her boss, her colleague, her roommate. Alternating between her encounters during this night and her past, the film finally sees a visibly confident Vidya coming to terms with her lot. And that is when dawn breaks... The title Shevri suggests an insignificant wisp of cotton, which is Vidya. An ordinary woman with ordinary dreams, leading a life which is now out of the ordinary for her. Her coming to terms with her state today and becoming present to her life is what gives an essence to the film.

"Shevri is an interesting film because of its innovative and intelligent cinematic narration by effective use of flashbacks" - Jury comment at the Pune International Film Festival 2007 where it won the best International Marathi Film Award.

== Cast ==
- Neena Kulkarni as Vidya Barve
- Dilip Prabhavalkar as Mr. Shinde, Vidya's office colleague
- Ravindra Mankani as Sudhir, Vidya's husband
- Mita Vashisht as Maya
- Mohan Agashe as Vidya's boss
- Uttara Baokar as Vidya's mother
- Saksham Kulkarni as Ashish, Vidya's son
- Prasad Oak as transgender
- Mangesh Desai as transgender
- Gauri Joshi
- Megha Ghatge
- Shivaji Satam in a special appearance
- Mukta Barve in a special appearance

== Accolades ==
Year	Award	Category	Nominee (s)	Result
2008	National Film Awards	Best Feature Film in Marathi	Producer: Neena Kulkarni; Director: Gajendra Ahire	Won
2008	National Film Awards	Best Actor in a Supporting Role	Dilip Prabhavalkar	Won
2007	Pune International Film Festival	Sant Tukaram Award for Best International Marathi Film	Neena Kulkarni	Won
2007	Pune International Film Festival	Sant Tukaram Award for Best Director	Gajendra Ahire	Won
