= Bioscope (2015 film) =

- Directed by: Ravi Jadhav; Girish Mohite; Viju Mane; Gajendra Ahire
- Written by: Vijay Tendulkar; Abay Dakhane; Viju Mane; Gajendra Ahire
- Produced by: Abhay Shevade
- Starring: Veena Jamkar; Mrunmayee Deshpande; Mangesh Desai; Smita Tambe; Spruha Joshi; Neena Kulkarni; Neha Pendse
- Cinematography: Vasudeo Rane; Santosh Shinde; Shabbir Naik; Krisha Souren
- Edited by: Manish More; Nilesh Gawand; Satish Patil; Mayur Hardas
- Music by: Salil Kulkarni; Avinash–Vishwajeet; Soham Pathak; Narendra Bhide
- Release date: 17 July 2015
- Country: India
- Language: Marathi

Bioscope is an Indian Marathi-language anthology drama film consisting of four short films directed by Ravi Jadhav, Girish Mohite, Viju Mane and Gajendra Ahire and produced by Abhay Shevade. Narrated by Gulzar. The film was released on 17 July 2015.

== Synopsis ==
An anthology of stories dealing with ambitions of accomplished musicians, insecurities of a shy man who is in love, the frustration of an educated farmer and a young woman's sexuality.

== Cast ==
Mitraa

- Veena Jamkar
- Mrunmayee Deshpande

Bail

- Mangesh Desai
- Smita Tambe
- Uday Sabnis
- Sagar Karande

Ek Hota Kau

- Kushal Badrike
- Spruha Joshi

Dili E Nadaan

- Neena Kulkarni
- Suhas
- Neha Pendse

== Soundtrack ==
Bioscope

Soundtrack album by Salil Kulkarni Avinash–Vishwajeet Soham Pathak Narendra Bhide
- Released: 2015
- Recorded: 2015
- Genre: Feature film soundtrack
- Length: 30:17
- Language: Marathi

Official audio
- Bioscope – Full Album on YouTube

Track listing
No.	Title	singer(s)	Length
1.	"Bioscope Title"	Raghubir Yadav	2:58
2.	"Dil-e-nadaan"	Shubha Joshi	7:41
3.	"Udaseet Ya"	Saleel Kulkarni	3:21
4.	"Pail Toge Kau"	Soham Pathak	4:49
5.	"Raat Isalun"	Prasanajeet Kosambi	4:26
6.	"Bawara mann"	Shubha Joshi	3:02
7.	"Saawariya"	Shubha Joshi	5:00
Total length:			30:17

== Critical response ==
Bioscope received positive reviews from critics. Mihir Bhanage of The Times of India gave the film 4 stars out of 5 and was appreciative "It combines the power of short films with the reputation of the directors to give something that is much needed in the industry; the scope for fearless experimentation. Come what may, don’t miss this one". Soumitra Pote of Maharashtra Times also gave it 4 stars out of 5 and similarly found that "Every Marathi mind should take note of these efforts made by these four directors. This experiment of making a film on poetry should also be appreciated". Ganesh Matkari of Pune Mirror wrote "It is easily accessible and maybe suggests a new direction for Marathi Cinema - the possible merging of the blockbuster with the art-house". A reviewer from Loksatta wrote "All these four short films in Bioscope. Gulzar's poetic description of the bioscope at the beginning of the film seems to be very useful".
