= Sarivar Sari =

- Theatrical release poster
- Directed by: Gajendra Ahire
- Produced by: Lata Narvekar; Bharti Achrekar
- Starring: Madhura Velankar; Neena Kulkarni; Mohan Joshi; Bharat Jadhav; Shreyas Talpade; Milind Gunaji
- Music by: Bhaskar Chandavarkar
- Release date: 20 October 2005
- Country: India
- Language: Marathi

Sarivar Sari is a 2005 Indian Marathi-language drama film directed by Gajendra Ahire. Madhura Velankar played the lead role of a free-spirited girl while Manasi Salvi, Mohan Joshi, and Neena Kulkarni played supporting roles.

== Plot ==
Manisha's independent spirit angers her father, who prefers her sister Vini, a medical student. When Manisha accepts a modeling contract, the tension in her family reaches the breaking point.

== Cast ==
- Madhura Velankar as Mani
- Manasi Salvi as Vini
- Neena Kulkarni as mother
- Mohan Joshi as father
- Bharat Jadhav as Sandip
- Shreyas Talpade
- Milind Gunaji as Piyush
- Sanjay Narvekar
- Pratik Lade as Pratik

== Soundtrack ==
The music is provided by Bhaskar Chandavarkar.

No.	Song	Singers	Length
1	"Onjalit Majhya"	Sadhana Sargam	5:26
2	"Kunya Gaavachi"	Vaishali Samant	4:40
3	"Saanjh Jhali Tari" F	Sadhana Sargam	7:04
4	"Kanth Aani Aabhal"	Shankar Mahadevan	5:23
5	"Saanjh Jhali Tari" M	Hariharan	7:04
