= Haapus =

- Theatrical poster
- Directed by: Abhijeet Satam
- Story by: Saurabh Bhave; Subodh Khanolkar
- Produced by: Sanjay Chhabria; Abhijeet Satam
- Starring: Makarand Anaspure; Subodh Bhave; Madhura Velankar; Shivaji Satam; Pushkar Shrotri
- Cinematography: Rahul Jadhav
- Edited by: Rahul Bhatankar
- Music by: Salil Kulkarni
- Release date: 25 June 2010
- Country: India
- Language: Marathi

Haapus is a Marathi film released on 25 June 2010. The movie has been produced by Sanjay Chhabria along with Abhijeet Satam who has also directed it. It stars Subodh Bhave, Madhura Velankar, Makarand Anaspure, Shivaji Satam and Pushkar Shrotri.

== Plot ==
Haapus throws light on an important aspect of the life of Malwani People. 'Haapus' is a Marathi film based on the farmers who are engaged in the cultivation of Haapus Aamba (Alphonso Mangoes) in the Konkan area of Maharashtra, India. Basically, it is a story about one family from a village where the young son of an astrologer wants to break the vicious circle of the mango-farmers getting peanuts for their produce from a rich business man who earns millions in the market, and to do so he has to contend with his father's immense belief in astrology. It is a light-hearted comedy, which people of all age groups can enjoy.

In Wanarwadi, in the picturesque Konkan, Anna's word is the LAW- because of his command over Astrology. But he is in conflict with Ajit, his only son who has developed a new breed of mangoes – the major bread-earner of this region. The Gurav family also has twin daughters – Amruta, the rebellious one and Ankita, the docile one who is in love with the local rickshaw driver Subhya. Enter school teacher Digamber Kale, from Aambejogai Marathwada, who soon becomes an integral part of the Gurav family.

Ajit wants to break the vicious circle of the mango-farmers getting peanuts from the CHAJED who earns millions in the Market. Anna opposes his view of going into the market himself with the mangoes as Anna's astrology says that this business is not conducive to the Gurav Family.

== Cast ==
- Shivaji Satam as Anna Gurav
- Makarand Anaspure as Digambar Kale
- Subodh Bhave as Ajit
- Madhura Velankar as Ankita and Amruta (Double role)
- Pushkar Shrotri as Subhya
- Sulabha Deshpande as Aaji
- Mrunal Deshpande as Anandi's mother
- Manasi Magikar as Ankita and Amruta's mother
- Vidyadhar Joshi as Chajed
- Swarasha Jadhav as Aanadi
- Amit Abhyankar as Doctor
- Sunil Deo

== Music ==
The music for the film is composed by Salil Kulkarni on lyrics by Sandeep Khare.

No.	Title	Singer(s)	Length
1.	"Asaa Asaawa"	Vibhavari Apte, Amruta Subhash, Anjali Kulkarni, Anuradha Marathe, Suvarna Mategaonkar, Pranjali Barve
2.	"Aamba Pikto Ras Galato"	Urmila Dhangar, Rahul Saxena
3.	"Haapus"	Avdhoot Gupte
