= Mayuri Deshmukh =

Indian actress (born 1992)

- Born: 3 September 1992 (age 33); Dhule, Maharashtra, India
- Occupation: Television actress
- Years active: 2011–present
- Known for: Khulta Kali Khulena; Imlie
- Spouse: Ashutosh Bhakre (m. 2016; died 2020)

Mayuri Deshmukh (born 3 September 1992) is an Indian television and film actress. She is known for portraying Manasi Deshpande in Zee Marathi's Khulta Kali Khulena. In November 2020 (till September 2022), she was playing Prof. Malini Chaturvedi in StarPlus's Imlie.

== Early life ==
Mayuri Deshmukh was born on 3 September 1992 in Dhule, Maharashtra. She belongs to a middle class Hindu family. Prabhakar Deshmukh, Hema More Deshmukh are her parents. She has two brothers Anup Deshmukh and Kunal Deshmukh in the family. Due to her father's government job, she studied in different parts of the country like Pune, Nanded, Mumbai, Visakhapatnam etc.

She completed her schooling from Rishi Vidyalaya Gurukulam in Visakhapatnam and various schools in the country. After which Mayuri completed graduation in BDS (Bachelor of Dental Science) from Navi-Mumbai's Dr. D.Y. Patil Dental College and Hospital.

== Career ==
Mayuri started her formal career with the debut in a Marathi film Dr. Prakash Baba Amte – The Real Hero in 2014. later, she worked in a play named Pleasant surprise.

She rose to fame all over Maharashtra with popular Marathi television show Khulta Kali Khulena, aired on Zee Marathi, where she played lead character of Manasi Deshpande.

Later she played a lead character of Mugdha in a film 31 Divas (2018) the character too, was appreciated by the audience across Maharashtra. In 2018, she played a character of Shanu aka Shanaya in her first written play as a writer, Dear Aajo, for which she got much appreciation. Also, she has played a character of Charu aka Charusheela in a play named Teesre Badshah Hum.

Also, she has worked in films like Grey (2018) and Lagna Kallol (2019) which are to be released soon. From 2020 to 2022, she was portraying Prof. Malini Chaturvedi in StarPlus's Imlie opposite Gashmeer Mahajani, Sumbul Touqeer, and Fahmaan Khan.

== Filmography ==
=== Films ===
Year	Movie	Role	Language	Ref.
2018	Dr. Prakash Baba Amte – The Real Hero	Dhiraj	Marathi	
2018	31 Divas	Mugdha	Marathi	
2020	Grey		Marathi	
2024	Lagna Kallol	Shruti	Marathi	
2024	Ek Daav Bhootacha	Madhumati	Marathi	

=== Television ===
Year	Serial	Language	Role	Notes	Ref.
2016–2017	Khulta Kali Khulena	Marathi	Manasi Deshpande	Lead role	
2020–2022	Imlie	Hindi	Prof. Aditya Chaturvedi	Lead role	
2024	Man Dhaga Dhaga Jodte Nava	Marathi	Sukhada	Lead role	
2025	Bhagya Lakshmi	Hindi	Neha	Supporting Role	

=== Theaters ===
Year	Work	Role	Ref.
2015	June July		
2016	Pleasant Surprise		
2018	Dear Aajo	Shanu/Shanaya	
2018	Teesre Badshah Hum	Charu	
