= Trupti Bhoir =

Indian actress

- Born: 17 May 1980 (age 46); Mumbai, Maharashtra, India
- Occupations: Actress, Film Producer
- Years active: 2000–present

Trupti Bhoir is a Marathi actress. She has worked in many Marathi movies and television serials. She is famous for the role of Najuka in the movie Agadbam. Trupti has always been comfortable with comedy as well as serious types of roles.

== Early life and education ==
Studied in Yashodham High School & Junior College.

== Career ==
Marathi actress Trupti Bhoir is not a new name to the Marathi theatre and film industry. As an actress, she has already had experience on stage, television and films. Young and ambitious Trupti, who hails from Mumbai, was a part of theatre before entering the mainstream cinema. Her journey began with a stage, followed by TV serials and films. While in college, she took part in drama competitions and also learned classical dance. This came to her advantage while venturing into this field.

Trupti has already won state-level awards for best acting, during her college days. Superhit Drama Sahi Re Sahi was her first break in professional Marathi theatre. Three years since then Trupti has been a part of this industry and she has done films like Ishya, Ovalte Bhauraya, Tujhya Majhya Sansarala..., and Paulkhuna, while her television serials include the famous Vadalvaat and Char Divas Sasuche.

Trupti always tries to do experiments with the characters she plays. In the movie Agadbam she played the role of the overweight girl Najuka. Touring Talkies: The film throws light on the culture of touring talkies – film screenings inside tents (tamboo), which is slowly dying. Chandi's touring talkies is one of the rare ones still surviving in Maharashtra. She and her brother Babya (Chinmay Sant) take great pride in showing films in their tent, which has been their family business since decades.

On Rajyasabha TV she was interviewed in the show Guftgoo with Trupti Bhoir. She explained how Touring Talkies is part of Indian Culture and why we should save it. Her film Touring Talkies was shortlisted along with 290 other films in the first round of eligibility for the Best Picture category of the Academy Awards.

== Filmography ==
=== As an actor ===
Year	Films	Director	Role
2000	Bagh Haat Dakhavan	Vishal Bahandari	
2008	Tujhya Majhya Sansarala Aani Kaay Hav	Satish Motling	
2010	Agadbam	Satish Motling	Najuka
2011	Hello Jai Hind!	Gajendra Ahire	Durga
2012	Uchala Re Uchala	Yashwant Chaughule, Amol Bhave	Kamini
2013	Touring Talkies	Gajendra Ahire	Chandi
2018	Maza Agadbam		Najuka

=== As a Film Producer ===
1. Touring Talkies
2. Hello Jai Hind
3. Tujhya Majhya Sansarala Aani Kaay Hav
4. Agadbam
5. Majha Agadbam

=== Television ===
1. Char Divas Sasuche
2. Vadalvaat

== Drama/Theatre/Album ==
1. Indrakshi (Sahyadri Production)
2. Sahi Re Sahi
