= Not Only Mrs. Raut =

- DVD cover
- Directed by: Gajendra Ahire
- Produced by: Aditi Deshpande
- Starring: Aditi Deshpande; Tushar Dalvi; Madhura Velankar
- Music by: Kaushal Inamdar
- Release date: 2003
- Country: India
- Language: Marathi

Not Only Mrs. Raut is a 2003 Indian Marathi social drama film directed by Gajendra Ahire. Aditi Deshpande, who plays the lead role of Mrs. Raut, has produced the film.

The film won National Award for Best Film in Marathi (Rajat Kamal) at the 51st National Film Awards for "its treatment of two women's struggle against male exploitation and domination".

== Plot ==
Mrs. Vidya Raut murders her boss Karkhanis near Juhu Beach and surrenders herself to the police. She also submits the murder weapon, a bloody dagger. Swati Dandavate, a budding scholar advocate decides to fight her case. Her initial meetings with Mrs. Raut are futile as she keeps confessing her crime and is ready for punishment. Convinced that something is being hidden from her, Swati decides to investigate. Swati's husband Aditya, who is also an advocate, is now public prosecutor in this case. He and his elder brother try to convince Swati to drop the case because they think she would obviously lose. But standing against her family, Swati decides to dig out the truth and defend Mrs. Raut.

== Cast ==
- Aditi Deshpande as Mrs. Vidya Raut
- Madhura Velankar as Advocate Swati Dandavate
- Tushar Dalvi as Public Prosecutor Aditya Vishnu Dandavate
- Mohan Joshi as Advocate Dada Vishnu Dandavate
- Vandana Gupte
- Vikram Gokhale as Judge
- Kaushal Inamdar as Witness / Hotel Boy
- Ketaki Karadekar as Sneha
- Ravindra Mankani as Raghuvir Karkhanis
- Milind Shinde as Advocate S.M. Garud

== Awards ==
- The film won the Silver Lotus Award (Rajat Kamal) for Best Film in Marathi.
- Madhura Velankar Won Maharashtra State Film Award (Special Jury Award)
- Zee Chitra Gaurav Puraskar for Best Actress for Aditi Deshpande.
- Aditi Deshpande won the Screen Best Actress - Marathi award for her performance of Mrs. Raut. She won this award jointly with Sonali Bendre, who played the role of Queen Sheelavati in Anahat (2003).
