= Ekdam Kadak =

- Theatrical release poster
- Directed by: Ganesh Shinde; Ajay Waghmare
- Written by: Kalpesh Jagtap, Ganesh shinde(story)
- Produced by: Ganesh Shinde
- Starring: Parth Bhalerao; Tanaji Galgunde; Arbaz Shaikh; Bhagyashree Mote; Gayatri Jadhav; Pranjali Kanzarkar; Chinmay Sant; Manasi Naik
- Cinematography: Baba Lad
- Edited by: Anant Kamath; Kamalakar Sonwane
- Music by: Music: Narendra Bhide; Pankaj Padghan; Umesh Gawali; Score: Vinit Deshpande
- Production company: Om Sai Cine Films
- Release date: 2 December 2022
- Running time: 130 minutes
- Country: India
- Language: Marathi

Ekdam Kadak is a 2022 Indian Marathi-language comedy film directed by Ganesh Shinde and produced by Om Sai Cine Films. It starring Parth Bhalerao, Tanaji Galgunde, Arbaz Shaikh, Bhagyashree Mote, Chinmay Sant, Gayatri Jadhav, Pranjali Kanzarkar. It was theatrically released on 2 December 2022.

== Cast ==
- Parth Bhalerao
- Tanaji Galgunde
- Arbaz Shaikh
- Bhagyashree Mote
- Gayatri Jadhav
- Pranjali Kanzarkar
- Chinmay Sant
- Jayshree Sonwane
- Rajdatt Patankar
- Manasi Naik (cameo)

== Release ==
=== Theatrical ===
The film was theatrically released on 2 December 2022.

== Reception ==
=== Critical reception ===
Saurav Mahind of Urbanly Pune gave only 1 star criticised comedy and addressed as the B grade movie.

== Soundtrack ==
Ekdam Kadak

Soundtrack album by Narendra Bhide, Pankaj Padghan and Umesh Gawali
- Released: 2022
- Genre: Feature film soundtrack
- Length: 11:07
- Language: Marathi
- Label: Video Palace

Music is composed by Narendra Bhide, Pankaj Padghan, Umesh Gawali.

Track listing
No.	Title	Lyrics	Music	Singer (s)	Length
1.	"Madam Kadak Hay"	Ganesh Shinde	Umesh Gawali	Umesh Gawali	3:06
2.	"Dildar Dost"	Mangesh Kangane	Narendra Bhide	Avdhoot Gupte	4:15
3.	"Dis Raat Tujya Maag Maag"	Ganesh Shinde	Pankaj Padghan	Sayali Pankaj, Saurabh Salunke	3:46
Total length:					11:07
