= Devyani (TV series) =

Marathi Television Drama

- Genre: Drama; Romance
- Starring: See below
- Country of origin: India
- Original language: Marathi
- No. of seasons: 2
- No. of episodes: 1314

Production
- Producers: Anuj Saxena (Season 1); Vidhyadhar Pathare (Season 2)
- Camera setup: Multi-camera
- Running time: 22 minutes
- Production companies: Maverick Production (Season 1); Iris Productions (Season 2)

Original release
- Network: Star Pravah
- Release: 19 March 2012 – 28 May 2016

Devyani is a Marathi language television series which aired on Star Pravah. Its second season aired from 27 July 2014 with name Devyani... Ekka Raja Rani. The series re-aired during the COVID-19 pandemic.

== Plot ==
=== Season 1 ===
It is a story of girl named Devyani a college girl whose life gets change after she enters the wedlock with her obsessive and die-hard lover Sangram. Devyani is a girl of her principles that are taught by his father, Sangram is opposite and who always follows his principles in life and is the master of his decisions. The show takes a new turn when Sangram falls head over heels with Devyani and makes all his efforts to let the girl become his wife.

=== Season 2 ===
It is a story about Devyani's journey from her childhood till now. Devyani is a confident girl who believes that the bad can be erased off if wanted. According to Devyani, good always beats bad. Devyani aspires to be a crime reporter and wishes to make the society better place to live in.

== Cast ==
=== Season 1 ===
- Shivani Surve as Devyani Kelkar / Devyani Vikhe-Patil; Sangram's wife, Aabasaheb and Chandrika's daughter-in-law, Ashu's sister, Subhanrao's daughter (2012-2013)
  - Deepali Pansare replacing Shivani as Devyani Kelkar / Devyani Vikhe-patil (2013-2014)
- Sangram Salvi as Sangram Vikhe-Patil; Devyani's husband, Aabasaheb and Chandrika's son, Samrat and Lavanya's brother, Aausaheb's grandson (2012-2014)
- Nagesh Bhonsle as Aabasaheb Vikhe-Patil; Sangram, Samrat and Lavanya's father, Devyani and Vatsala's father-in-law, Chandrika's husband, Aausaheb's son (2012-2014)
- Surekha Kudachi as Chandrika Vikhe-Patil; Sangram, Samrat and Lavanya's mother, Aabasaheb's wife, Aausaheb's daughter-in-law, Devyani and Vatsala's mother-in-law (2012-2013)
  - Sunila Karambelkar replacing Surekha as Chandrika Vikhe-Patil (2013-2014)
- Sai Ranade as Vatsala Vikhe-Patil; Samrat's wife, Aabasaheb and Chandrika's daughter-in-law (2012-2013)
- Devdatta Nage as Samrat Vikhe-Patil; Vatsala's husband, Girija's ex-husband, Aabasaheb and Chandrika's son, Samrat and Lavanya's brother, Aausaheb's grandson (2013-2014)
- Richa Pariyalli as Girija; Samrat's second and ex-wife (2012-2013)
  - Samidha Guru replacing Pariyalli as Girija; Samrat's second wife (2013)
- Prachi Pisat as Lavanya Vikhe-Patil; Sangram and Samrat's sister, Devyani's sister-in-law, Aabasaheb and Chandrika's daughter, Aausaheb's granddaughter (2012)
  - Pooja Kadam replacing Prachi as Lavanya Vikhe-Patil (2012-2014)
- Gauri Kendre as Aausaheb Vikhe-Patil; Sangram, Samrat and Lavanya's grandmother, Chandrika's daughter-in-law, Aabasaheb's mother (2012-2014)
- Maadhav Deochake as Dr. Namit; Devyani's ex-fiancé and best friend (2012)
- Khushboo Tawde as Tara; Sangram's obsessive lover (2013)
- Atul Abhyankar as Tara's father (2013)
- Madhura Godbole as Ashu; Devyani's sister (2012-2013)
- Rajan Tamhane as Subhanrao Kelkar; Devyani's father (2012)
- Namit Godbole as Ashwin Kelkar; Devyani's brother (2012-2013)
- Rama Joshi as Devyani's grandmother
- Vijay Mishra as Devyani's uncle
- Sudhant Shelar
- Vidyadhar Joshi as Hambirrao Vikhe-Patil; Aabasaheb's cousin, Sangram, Samrat and Lavanya's uncle; Manjula's son, Vikram's father (2013)
- Mrunal Chemburkar as Hambirrao's wife, Manjula's daughter-in-law, Vikram's mother, Sangram, Samrat and Lavanya's aunt (2013)
- Neena Kulkarni as Manjula Vikhe-Patil; Hambirrao's mother, Vikram's grandmother, Sangram, Samrat and Lavanya's grandmother (2013)
- Prasad Limaye as Vikram Vikhe-Patil; Hambirrao's son, Manjula's grandson, Sangram, Samrat and Lavanya's cousin (2013)
- Rasika Vengurlekar as Rani; Vikhe-Patil's homemade (2012-2013)
- Smita Saravade as Mandakini; Aabasaheb's sister-in-law (2012)
- Anuj Saxena as Advocate Anuj Daftardari (2013)
- Vibhuti Thakur as Vibhuti Daftardari (2013)
- Kaustubh Diwan as Jay; Lavanya's boyfriend (2013)
- Sushant Shelar as Police Inspector (2012)
- Rashmi Anpat as Pallavi (2013)
- Ravi Patwardhan as Kakasaheb (2013)
- Bharati Patil as Sangram's Kakisaheb (2013)

=== Season 2 ===
- Bhagyashree Mote as Devyani Ekka Sawant; Ekka's wife, Surekha's daughter-in-law, Sara and Yashodhan's sister-in-law (2014-2015)
  - Siddhi Karkhanis replacing Bhagyashree as Devyani Ekka Sawant (2015-2016)
- Vivek Sangle as Ekka Sawant (Baji); Devyani's husband, Surekha's adoptive son, Sara and Yashodhan's adoptive brother (2014-2016)
- Kishori Ambiye as Surekha Sawant; Ekka's adoptive mother, Devyani's mother-in-law, Sara and Yashodhan's mother (2014-2016)
- Shreejit Marathe as Inspector Chittaranjan (Chitta); Devyani's ex-fiancé and obsessive lover (2014-2015)
- Shweta Mahadik as Ekka's Sister-in-law (2014-2015)
- Shraddha Pokhrankar as Radhika; Devyani's childhood friend, Ranjan's obsessive lover (2014-2015)
- Omkar Kulkarni as Yashodhan Sawant; Ekka's adoptive brother, Surekha's son, Sara's brother (2014-2015)
- Abhidnya Bhave as Veena; Ekka's obsessive lover (2015-2016)
- Divesh Medge as Vinayak; Devyani's brother (2015-2016)
- Sara Shravan as Sara; Ekka's adoptive sister, Surekha's daughter, Yashodhan's sister, Devyani's sister-in-law (2014-2016)
- Vinod Gaykar as Taimur; Ekka's sidekick (2014-2016)

== Production ==
=== Casting ===
It is produced by Anuj Saxena under the banner of Maverick Productions. It was airing from 19 March 2012 on Star Pravah by replacing Bandh Reshmache. It starred Shivani Surve, Sangram Salvi, Nagesh Bhonsle as Devyani, Sangram and Aabasaheb respectively. Shivani Surve was removed from the show in 2013 because of her tantrums. She was replaced by Deepali Pansare who played the role of Devyani. In 2014, all casts of the show were changed for new story. Parallel lead Bhagyashree Mote playing New Devyani and recurring one Vivek Sangle. In 2015, Bhagyashree Mote also quit the series and Siddhi Karkhanis was cast in the role.

=== Ratings ===
Week	Year	TAM TVR	Rank		Ref.
Week	Year	TAM TVR	Mah/Goa	All India	Ref.
Week 15	2012	0.81	2	70	
Week 16	2012	0.9	2	66	
Week 17	2012	0.96	1	71	
Week 19	2012	0.94	1	64	
Week 21	2012	1.08	1	51	
Week 22	2012	1.22	1	41	

== Adaptations ==
Language	Title	Original release	Network(s)	Last aired	Notes
Hindi	Mann Kee Awaaz Pratigya मन की आवाज प्रतिज्ञा	7 December 2009	StarPlus	27 October 2012	Original
Kannada	Krishna Rukmini ಕೃಷ್ಣ ರುಕ್ಮಿಣಿ	2 May 2011	Star Suvarna	8 March 2013	Remake
Marathi	Devyani देवयानी	19 March 2012	Star Pravah	28 May 2016	Remake
Tamil	Puthu Kavithai புது கவிதை	18 December 2013	Star Vijay	29 May 2015	Remake
Malayalam	Gouri Shankaram ഗൗരിശങ്കരം	3 July 2023	Asianet	27 December 2024	Remake
Kannada	Gowri Shankara ಗೌರಿ ಶಂಕರ	13 November 2023	Star Suvarna	Ongoing	Remake
Tamil	Sakthivel: Theeyaai Oru Theeraa Kaadhal சக்திவேல்: தீயாய் ஒரு தீராக்காதல்	4 December 2023	Star Vijay	Ongoing	Remake
Telugu	Satyabhama సత్యభామ	18 December 2023	Star Maa	Ongoing	Remake
