= Tumchi Mulgi Kay Karte? =

Marathi-language crime thriller TV series

- Genre: Drama
- Starring: See below
- Country of origin: India
- Original language: Marathi
- No. of episodes: 345

Production
- Producer: Manava Naik
- Production locations: Mumbai, Maharashtra, India
- Camera setup: Multi-camera
- Running time: 22 minutes
- Production company: Strawberry Pictures

Original release
- Network: Sony Marathi
- Release: 20 December 2021 – 15 January 2023

Tumchi Mulgi Kay Karte? (Marathi: तुमची मुलगी काय करते?) (transl. What does your daughter do?) is an Indian Marathi language crime-thriller drama series. It starred Madhura Velankar, Jui Bhagwat and Harish Dudhade in lead roles. It is produced by Manava Naik under the banner of Strawberry Pictures. It premiered on 20 December 2021 on Sony Marathi, replacing Vaidehi - Shatjanmache Apule Nate. The show aired its last episode on 15 February 2023. The show was also dubbed in Bengali language as Tomar Meye Ki Kore? (Bengali: তোমার মেয়ে কী করে?) which premiered on 5 December 2022 and aired on Sony Aath.

Following the success of the serial, a spin-off serial titled Kaaran Gunhyala Maafi Naahi (Marathi: कारण गुन्ह्याला माफी नाही) (transl. Because crime has no forgiveness) was released in 2023 with its final episode airing in 2024.

== Plot ==
In a dangerous and challenging attempt to save her own teenage daughter, a reputed school-teacher named Shraddha Mirajkar who is also trusting mother ends up saving the bunch of vulnerable teenagers who are exposed to the hazardous world of narcotics which results in tarnishing her own reputed image in front of society and her family. It is a story of a simple working mother who is ready to go to any extent to find and instil faith in her lost innocent daughter. Shraddha believes that she has brought up her daughter Savani in the most appropriate way; whereas a teen college-going Savani becomes scapegoat to a vicious narcotics world and suddenly disappears. Shraddha’s nightmare begins with her search to find Savani. With the help of Inspector Vijay Bhosale, she unveils certain facts and truths about Savani and the dark world. She has walked into but decides to tread the same path and enter the dangerous malicious world to trace and bring back her lost daughter.

== Cast ==
=== Main ===
- Madhura Velankar as Shraddha Abhay Mirajkar (née Sawant): A teacher, Savani's mother, Abhay's wife, Wyankat's daughter, Madhav and Kumud's daughter-in-law
- Jui Bhagwat as "Sau" Savani Abhay Mirajkar: Shraddha's and Abhay's daughter, Madhav, Kumud, Wyankat and Varsha's granddaughter, Vaibhavi and Viraj's first cousin, Akshay and Karishma's friend
- Harish Dudhade as "Chiku" Inspector Vijay Bhosale: Rajesh and Sharmila's son

=== Recurring ===
- Chandralekha Joshi as PSI Seema Jamdade
- Nitin Bhajan as ACP Bhushan Sherekar (Super Cop)
- Madhugandha Kulkarni as ACP Vishakha Chaudhari
- Ashish Kulkarni as Abhay Mirajkar: Savani's father, Shraddha's Husband, Kumud and Madhav's son, Wyankat's son-in-law, Ajit's brother
- Satish Pulekar as Madhav Mirajkar: Kumud's husband, Ajit and Abhay's father, Shraddha and Neeta's father-in-law, Savani, Vaibhavi and Viraj's grandfather
- Vidya Karanjikar as Kumud Mirajkar: Madhav's wife, Ajit and Abhay's mother, Shraddha and Neeta's mother-in-law, Savani, Vaibhavi and Viraj's grandmother
- Sanjay Mone as Wyankat Sawant: Shraddha's father, Varsha's husband, Abhay's father-in-law, Savani's grandfather
- Nayana Apte-Joshi as Varsha Sawant: Shraddha's mother, Wyankat's wife, Abhay's mother-in-law, Savani's grandmother
- Surabhi Dhamal as Vaibhavi Mirajkar: Ajit and Neeta's daughter, Savani's first cousin, Viraj's sister, Madhav and Kumud's granddaughter
- Harshal Patil as Ajit Mirajkar: Abhay's brother, Neeta's husband, Madhav and Kumud's son, Vaibhavi and Viraj's father
- Gauri Kulkarni as Neeta Mirajkar: Viraj and Vaibhavi's mother, Madhav and Kumud's daughter-in-law
- Inesh Kotian as Viraj Mirajkar: Ajit and Neeta's son, Savani's first cousin, Vaibhavi's brother, Madhav and Kumud's grandson
- Prashant Sathe as "Kilver" Sanjay Vengsarkar: A cartel leader, IPS Officer
- Sharvari Lohokare as Charu Gala / Lata Karde (Fake "Kilver"): Kilver's operative, Abhay's friend
- Pratima Joshi as "Tai" Vidya Gole: A drug dealer, Kilver's rival
- Kshitee Jog as CBI Officer Kankyakumari Dange (KK Madam): Assigned for the murder case of MLA Mahadik
- Tejas Ghadigaonkar as Shyaam Ji: KK's assistant
- Tushar Ghadigaonkar as Bangdu: Tai's brother
- Jayant Savarkar as Chintu Nana: Wyankat's friend
- Manava Naik as Nilanjana Verma: Savani's psychiatrist
- Meera Joshi as Sonia Mohan: An actress
- Abhinav Kurane as Akshay Vilas Sadavarte: Savani's friend
- Shrushti Bhilare as Karishma Mane: Mahalaxmi's daughter, Rahul's sister, Savani's friend
- Geeta Panchal as Mahalaxmi Mane: Mirajkar's maid
- Sanjana Patil as "Nuts" Natasha Rao: Savani's friend
- Sushrut Mulavekar as "Anky" Ankit: Natasha's step-brother
- Unknown as Himmat Khatri: Natasha's boyfriend
- Suvedha Desai as "Bhaagu" Bhagyashree Dalvi: Savani's collegemate
- Vivek Gore as Prasad Varadkar: Shraddha's colleague
- Megha Pathre as Bhasha Naik: Shraddha's colleague
- Sanjeevkumar Patil as MLA Aamdaar Mahadik
- Aparna Chothe as Vandana Lokhande
- Rutuja Gadre as Neha Tai Shette: Lead reporter of Jagruti.com news channel
- Milind Phatak as Rajesh Bhosale: Vijay Bhosale's father, Sharmila's husband
- Ashwini Mukadam as Sharmila Rajesh Bhosale: Vijay Bhosale's mother, Rajesh's wife
- Srushti Bahekar as Bashundhara Godbole
- Tejas Raut as Vish
- Vishwas Navare as Zele
- Shashank Chandra as Constable "Tawde"
- Mamta Brid as Mayu, prisoner
- Apurva Choudhari as Sangi, prisoner
- Kalyani Gajageshwar as Juley, prisoner
- Unknown as Bhanu Argade: Kilver's ex-operative
- Unknown as Himavanti Gala: Charu Gala's mother

== Dubbed version ==
Language	Title	Original release	Network(s)	Last aired
Marathi (original version)	Tumchi Mulgi Kay Karte? तुमची मुलगी काय करते?	20 December 2021	Sony Marathi	15 January 2023
Bengali (dubbed version)	Tomar Meye Ki Kore? তোমার মেয়ে কী করে?	5 December 2022	Sony Aath	TBA
