= Khulta Kali Khulena =

Marathi-language television program

- Genre: Drama
- Directed by: Hemant Deodhar; Vijay Rane
- Starring: See below
- Theme music composer: Samir Saptiskar
- Opening theme: "Khulta Kali Khulena" by Shreya Ghoshal
- Country of origin: India
- Original language: Marathi
- No. of episodes: 372

Production
- Producer: Santosh Kanekar
- Production locations: Mumbai, Maharashtra, India
- Camera setup: Multi-camera
- Running time: 22 minutes
- Production companies: Atharva Theatre & Events

Original release
- Network: Zee Marathi
- Release: 18 July 2016 – 16 September 2017

Khulta Kali Khulena (transl. The opening bud did not open) is an Indian Marathi language TV series which aired on Zee Marathi. It starred Omprakash Shinde, Mayuri Deshmukh and Abhidnya Bhave in the lead roles. It premiered from 18 July 2016 by replacing Majhe Pati Saubhagyawati.

== Plot ==
Dr. Vikrant Dalvi, who is a renowned gynaecologist by profession, is set to tie the knot with Monica. Vikrant hails from a renowned family of doctors by profession, while Monica and her sister Manasi were orphaned at the ages of five and three, respectively, due to a horrific accident. Ever since, they have been raised by their paternal grandparents. Vikrant shows love toward Monica after she married him despite learning that she is three months pregnant and soon reveals it to Nirmala as well as his new sister-in-law Manasi, but they all keep the nasty truth hidden for the sake of both Monica, the Dalvis' family honour and the aged Deshpandes. Later, Vikrant confronts Monica, but she denies any allegation of a previous affair, and considers her situation an honest mistake. Hence, Vikrant and Monica get along with each other. Monica tries to get an abortion, but Vikrant prevents it due to the health risks to her and the advanced stage of her pregnancy. Soon, Manasi joins Nirmala’s hospital as a pediatrician and later become best friends. Monica becomes jealous seeing their friendship and confronts them from time to time. Vikrant and Manasi swiftly deflect Monica's confrontations. Throughout the marriage, Monica is established as an extremely selfish, manipulative, and ungrateful woman who treats her in-laws with utter disrespect no matter how much tender love and care they give her for her pregnancy and unborn child despite suspecting an inconsistency between the date of her marriage and the stage of her pregnancy. Eventually, Monica is forced to insist that the unborn child's biological father is Vikrant in order to prevent confrontation. The Dalvis earlier turned cold by this revelation, however they get along well with the Deshpandes for the sake of the unborn child.

Later, Vikrant learns that the Monica was aware about her pregnancy before her marriage. Hence, Vikrant confronts her in front of whole family. By this shocking stance of Vikrant, the entire family sides Vikrant about the divorce, but Monica threatens the family to hurt her unborn child. Manasi starts dating Salil Pandit on her grandparents' recommendation. But her mind is focused on and concerned about Vikrant and the unborn child, something gone unnoticed by neither Salil nor her grandparents. During a court hearing on a chilly January morning, Monica collapses and goes into labour pain. Post 8 hours of surgery, her daughter is born and later named Isha. On the day of Isha's naming ceremony, Vikrant confesses to his family that everything was a lie, he is not Isha's biological father, and that the food poisoning Monica encountered was too a lie, because it was really a suicide attempt which got thwarted by Vikrant to save the innocent unborn daughter. Ajji gets salty and slaps both Vikrant and Monica. Due to troubles caused by Monica and her overall neglect towards Isha, Manasi eventually shifts to Delhi with Isha.

3 years later

Later, Isha and Manasi return to Mumbai. Vikrant's Ajji moved back to her native village due to escape the constant conflict within her family. Monica, who lives with Vikrant to fund her expensive lifestyle, gets insecure because of Isha and Manasi. Later, when Vikrant tries to divorce her, she uses Isha as a pawn against Vikrant. Also, Manasi confesses to Salil about her emotional attachment to Vikrant and Isha. Monica's ex-boyfriend and Isha's biological father Rajan returns, and defrauds Monica, leaving her torn and trembling on the road. Finally, Vikrant and Manasi express their love for each other but decide not to marry each other against Isha's will.

== Cast ==
=== Main ===
- Mayuri Deshmukh as Dr. Manasi Shashikant Deshpande
- Omprakash Shinde as Dr. Vikrant Vijay Dalvi
- Abhidnya Bhave as Monica Vikrant Dalvi / Monica Shashikant Deshpande

=== Recurring ===
- Usha Nadkarni as Parvati Sadashiv Dalvi - Vikrant's grandmother
- Savita Prabhune as Alka Vijay Dalvi - Vikrant's mother
- Sanjay Mone as Vijay Sadashiv Dalvi - Vikrant's father
- Lokesh Gupte / Mangesh Salvi as Mohan Sadashiv Dalvi - Vikrant's uncle
- Sharvari Lohokare / Sharvani Pillai as Geeta Mohan Dalvi - Vikrant's aunt
- Manasi Magikar as Malati Govind Deshpande - Manasi and Monica's grandmother
- Arun Mohare as Govind R. Deshpande - Manasi and Monica's grandfather
- Asha Shelar as Dr. Nirmala Sadashiv Dalvi - Vikrant's aunt
- Rutuja Dharmadhikari as Richa - Monica's friend
- Sankarshan Karhade as Salil Gajanan Pandit - Manasi's fiance
- Sunil Godbole as Nanu Ajoba - Vikrant's great-uncle
- Sharvari Patankar as Sai - Deshpandes' paying guest
- Seema Ghogale as Bakula (Bucks) - Monica's personal assistant
- Niranjan Namjoshi as Rajan Manohar Sawant - Monica's boyfriend, Isha's biological father

== Reception ==
=== Special episode (1 hour) ===
1. 21 August 2016
2. 25 December 2016

=== Ratings ===
Week	Year	BARC Viewership		Ref.
Week	Year	TRP	Rank	Ref.
Week 47	2016	2.4	5	
25 December 2016	1 Hour Special	3.2	3	
Week 6	2017	2.0	5	
Week 8	2017	2.7	4	
Week 17	2017	2.3	5	
Week 38	2017	3.1	4	

== Awards ==
Zee Marathi Utsav Natyancha Awards 2016
Category	Recipient	Role
Best Character Female	Usha Nadkarni	Parvati Dalvi
Best Title Song	Shreya Ghoshal	
