= Agadbam =

- Theatrical release poster
- Directed by: Satish Motling
- Produced by: Trupti Bhoir
- Starring: Makarand Anaspure; Trupti Bhoir; Usha Nadkarni; Chitra Navathe; Vikas Samudre; Narayan Jadhav
- Music by: Ajit - Sameer
- Distributed by: Everest Entertainment Pvt. Ltd.
- Release date: 18 December 2010
- Country: India
- Language: Marathi

Agadbam is a Marathi film released on 18 December 2010. This film is directed by Satish Motling and produced by Trupti Bhoir.This movie was inspired from 2006 Telugu movie "Kithakithalu".The movie was reported to be an inspiration for the 2015 Hindi movie Dum Laga Ke Haisha.

== Cast ==
- Makarand Anaspure
- Trupti Bhoir
- Usha Nadkarni
- Tejaswi Patil
- Chitra Navathe
- Vikas Samudre
- Narayan Jadhav

=== Track listing ===
No.	Title	Length
1.	"Babooo Babooo"	4:27
