= Aditi Deshpande =

Indian actress

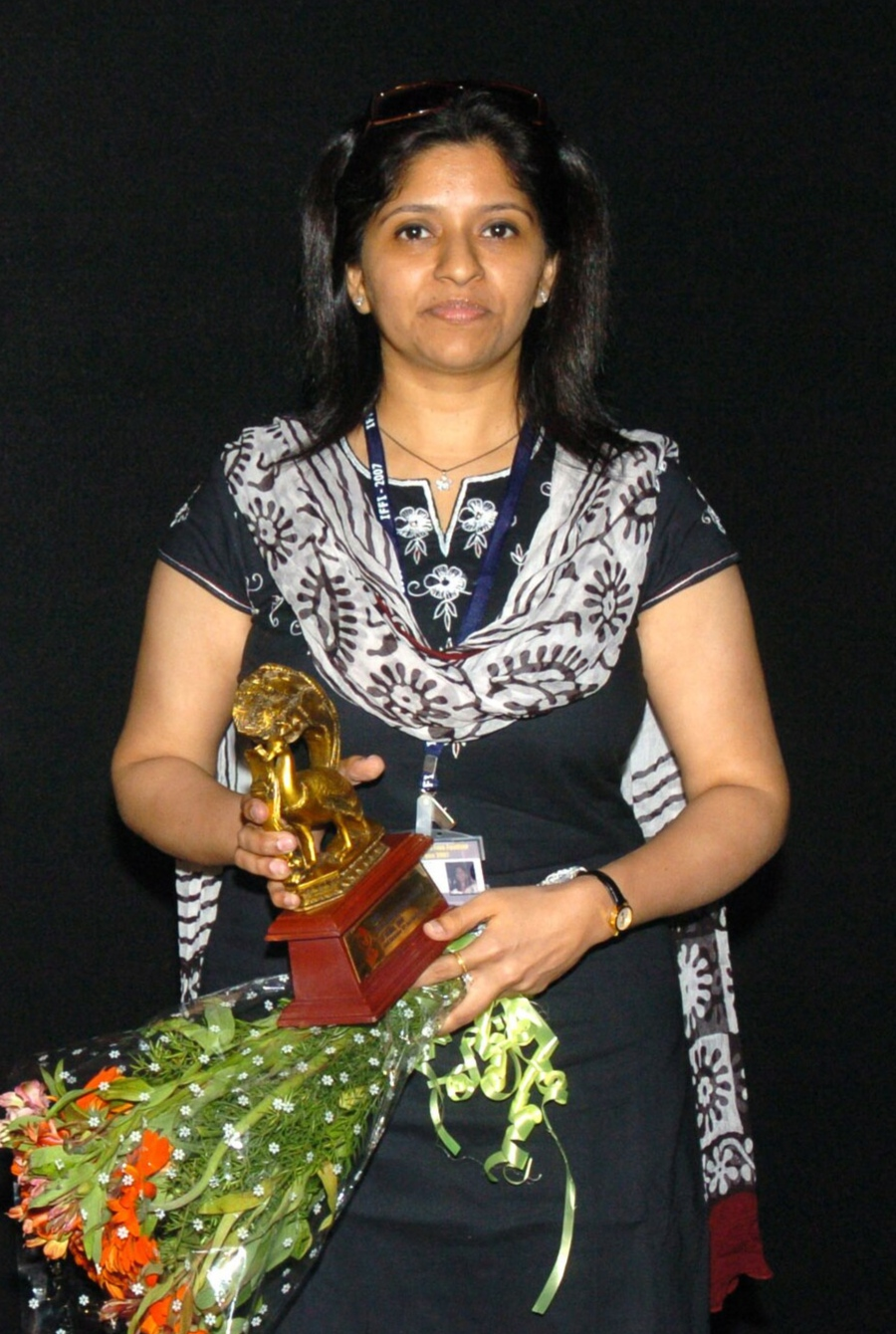
- Deshpande in 2007
- Born: Mumbai, Maharashtra
- Occupation: Actress
- Years active: 1996 – Present
- Spouse: Ninad Deshpande (m. 1997)
- Children: 1
- Relatives: Sulabha Deshpande (mother-in-law); Arvind Deshpande (father-in-law)

Aditi Deshpande is an Indian actress who works in Marathi and Hindi cinema, television, and theatre. She is the daughter-in-law of theatre and film actors Sulabha Deshpande and Arvind Deshpande. She is the recipient of a National Film Award and Maharashtra State Film Award for Best Actress.

== Career ==
Deshpande has worked in the entertainment industry for several decades. Her career includes roles in various Marathi and Hindi language films. In 2003, she appeared in the film Not Only Mrs. Raut. Her subsequent film credits include Pak Pak Pakaak (2005), Maai Baap (2007), Jogwa (2009), Vazandar (2016), and Dashakriya (2017).

In television, she has been cast in several daily soaps. She played a recurring role in the television series Phulala Sugandha Maticha (2020), portraying the character of Jiji Akka. Her other television work includes an appearance in the Sony TV series Main Maike Chali Jaungi Tum Dekhte Rahiyo. Her professional work also includes participation in various theatre productions.

== Personal life ==
Deshpande married Ninad Deshpande in 1997. She is the daughter-in-law of the late, renowned theatre and film personalities Sulabha Deshpande and Arvind Deshpande. In various interviews, Deshpande has frequently spoken about her relationship with her mother-in-law, Sulabha Deshpande, describing her as a significant source of both professional and personal guidance. She has often noted that the supportive environment within her family allowed her to pursue her acting career with independence while balancing her domestic responsibilities. She has one child.

== Filmography ==
=== Films ===
Year	Film	Role	Notes
2003	Not Only Mrs. Raut	Vidya Raut	Debut film
2005	Pak Pak Pakaak	Amba	
2007	Mai Baap	Sudha Sontakke	
2009	Jogwa	Taanu Akka	
2014	Rege	Pradeep's wife	
2016	Vazandar	Maya	
2017	Dashakriya	Shanta	

=== Television ===
Year	Title	Role	Notes
1996-1997	Karamati	Aditi	Debut series
2001	Kharach Maza Chukla Ka?	Kavita	
2017	Pehredaar Piya Ki	Sushma Bhavan Singh	
2017	Rishta Likhenge Hum Naya	Choti Thakurnisa	
2018	Main Maike Chali Jaungi Tum Dekhte Rahiyo	Rama Surana	
2020-2022	Phulala Sugandha Maticha	Jiji Akka	
2023	Meet: Badlegi Duniya Ki Reet	Poonam Chaudhary	
2026	Pathrakhin	Sulakshana Suryavanshi	
