= Butterfly (2023 film) =

- Theatrical release poster
- Directed by: Meera Welankar
- Written by: Dialogues: Kalyani Pathare; Aditya Ingle
- Screenplay by: Vibhavari Deshpande; Meera Welankar
- Story by: Vibhavari Deshpande
- Produced by: Ajit Bhure; Abhijit Satam; Madhura Velankar
- Starring: Madhura Velankar; Abhijit Satam; Mahesh Manjrekar; Pradeep Velankar; Sonia Parchure; Radha Dharne
- Cinematography: Vasudeo Rane
- Edited by: Jayant Jathar
- Music by: Shubhajit Mukherjee
- Production companies: Aseem Entertainment; Approgramme Studios
- Release date: 2 June 2023
- Country: India
- Language: Marathi

Butterfly is a 2023 Indian Marathi-language drama film directed by Meera Welankar in his Directorial Debut and produced by Aseem Entertainment and Approgramme Studios. The film stars Madhura Velankar, Abhijit Satam, Mahesh Manjrekar, Pradeep Velankar, Sonia Parchure, Radha Dharne.

== Cast ==
- Madhura Velankar
- Abhijit Satam
- Mahesh Manjrekar
- Pradeep Velankar
- Sonia Parchure
- Radha Dharne

== Release ==
=== Theatrical ===
The film was theatrically released on 2 June 2023. Previously it was scheduled to be released on 5 May 2023.

== Soundtrack ==
Butterfly

Soundtrack album by Shubhajit Mukherjee
- Released: 2023
- Genre: Feature film soundtrack
- Length: 8:44
- Language: Marathi
- Label: Zee Music Company

Official audio
- Butterfly - Full Album on YouTube

All lyrics are written by Vaibhav Joshi; all music is composed by Shubhajit Mukherjee.

Track listing
No.	Title	Singer (s)	Length
1.	"Kori Kori Zing"	Vaishali Mhade	2:51
2.	"Dhaage"	Hamsika Iyer	5:53
Total length:			8:44

== Reception ==
=== Critical reception ===
A reviewer from Maharashtra Times rated 3.5 stars out of 5 and wrote: "So far there have been many works of art with housewives, women at the center; But the film is a good example of how the subject can be presented beautifully with simplicity without being over-the-top."

A reviewer from The Times of India rated 3.0 out of 5 and wrote: "Butterfly explorers some unique themes without once getting preachy."
