= Touring Talkies (2013 film) =

- Poster
- Directed by: Gajendra Ahire
- Written by: Gajendra Ahire
- Produced by: Trupti Bhoir
- Starring: Subodh Bhave; Trupti Bhoir; Milind Shinde; Kishor Kadam; Vaibhav Mangle; Chinmay Sant, Neha Pendse; Suhas Palshikar
- Narrated by: Vinay Apte
- Cinematography: Mahesh Limaye
- Edited by: Ballu Saluja
- Music by: Ilaiyaraaja
- Production company: Trupti Bhoir Films
- Release date: 19 April 2013
- Country: India
- Language: Marathi

Touring Talkies is a 2013 Indian Marathi-language film directed by Gajendra Ahire and produced by Trupti Bhoir, starring Subodh Bhave, Trupti Bhoir and Neha Pendse.

== Plot ==
The film is based on the concept of roaming cinema which was one of the oldest traditions in the bygone era of Indian cinema where the movies were showcased in tents for the local folks also known as Touring talkies. For the past few decades these films have made a common recurring occurrences in most of the Carnival Fun fair taking place across villages where the Marathi Cinema is adored in a completely distinctive fashion

== Cast ==
- Trupti Bhoir as Chaandi
- Subodh Bhave
- Milind Shinde
- Kishor Kadam
- Suhas Palshikar
- Vaibhav Mangle
- Chinmay Sant
- Neha Pendse

== Music ==
The songs of the film are composed by Ilaiyaraaja.

1. "Title Song" - N/A
2. "Theme"

== Reception ==
Boyd van Hoeij of The Hollywood Reporter wrote, "This broadly played crowd-pleaser pits a no-nonsense female projectionist against an art house director in rural India".
