= Hello Jai Hind! =

- Promotional Poster
- Directed by: Gajendra Ahire
- Produced by: Trupti Bhoir
- Starring: Nitin Chandrakant Desai; Trupti Bhoir
- Cinematography: Amalendu Chaudhary
- Edited by: Ballu Saluja
- Music by: Ilaiyaraaja
- Release date: 25 November 2011
- Running time: 115 minutes
- Country: India
- Language: Marathi

Hello Jai Hind! is a 2011 Marathi-language Indian film directed by Gajendra Ahire, starring Nitin Chandrakant Desai and Trupti Bhoir. The film follows the story of a person and the trouble he faces in the society, when he takes on life only through the right path.

== Cast ==
- Nitin Chandrakant Desai
- Trupti Bhoir
- Kedar Shinde
- Vinay Apte
- Murli Sharma
- Ravindra Mankani
- Amita Khopkar
- Vibhavari Deshpande
- Yatin Karyekar
- Ameya Zare
- Apoorva Kulkarni

== Soundtrack ==
The music for Hello Jai Hind! is composed by Illayaraja. This is Illayaraja's first outing in Marathi films.

- "Lautke Aane De"
- "Ganjyaleela" - Hariharan
- "Dhol Vajato"
- "Jagdish Gharat"
- "Aaganat Umalle"
