= Anumati (film) =

- Directed by: Gajendra Ahire
- Written by: Gajendra Ahire
- Produced by: Vinay Ganu
- Starring: Vikram Gokhale; Neena Kulkarni; Subodh Bhave; Sai Tamhankar; Kishor Kadam; Arun Nalawade; Anand Abhyankar
- Cinematography: Govind Nihalani
- Edited by: Santosh Gotoskar
- Release date: 14 June 2013
- Country: India
- Language: Marathi

Anumati is a 2013 Marathi film directed and written by Gajendra Ahire. The film stars Vikram Gokhale and Neena Kulkarni in the lead roles. The film has received wide critical acclaim. It won the Best Feature Film Award at the New York Indian Film Festival and Gokhale received National Film Award for Best Actor for his role.

Anupam Khers The Signature movie is the remake of Anumati.

== Plot ==
The movie is based on the helplessness of old man whose wife slips into coma and is on ventilator in the hospital. Expenditures of hospitalisation and medicine are beyond his means. One day he wanders into the home of his college days friend and she learns of the situation after seeing the hospital file in his bag. She goes to hospital and deposits the required money but when she returns, she finds him collapsed dead on the dining table.

== Awards ==
National Film Award for Best Actor – Vikram Gokhale

== Song ==
The film includes situational poetry rendered by the lead character Ratnakar played by veteran actor Vikram Gokhale. The movie had melodious song "Phulanchi palakhi nighali" which was sung by Suresh. There is another song "Ghir aai sham" in Hindi rendered by classical singer Prachi Dublay.
