= Neena Kulkarni =

Indian actress

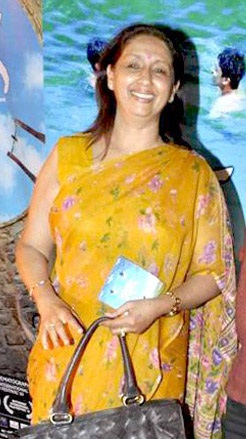
- Born: Neena Joshi; 15 August 1955 (age 71); Pune, Maharashtra
- Occupations: Actress; producer; director
- Years active: 1977–present
- Spouse: Dilip Kulkarni (m. 1980; died 2002)
- Children: 2

Neena Kulkarni (née Joshi; born 15 August 1955) is an Indian actress who is known for her work on Marathi and Hindi films, television and stage productions. She has received several awards including a National Film Award, Maharashtra State Film Awards and three Filmfare Awards Marathi.

== Early life ==
Kulkarni was born in 1955 in Pune. Her parents were both doctors. She attended Canossa Convent High School and Elphinstone College, Mumbai. She was married to Dilip Kulkarni until his death in 2002.

== Career ==
Neena Kulkarni is a celebrated Indian actress, director, and producer known for her remarkable contributions to Marathi and Hindi films, television, theatre, and international cinema. Born in 1955 to a family of doctors, she was educated at Canossa Convent High School and Elphinstone College with a degree in French in Mumbai. She started her career with Modelling and became the first Clearasil Girl in print media in the early 70s. She was married to Dilip Kulkarni until his passing in 2002. They have two children, both are also working in the entertainment industry and often work alongside her, continuing the family’s creative legacy. Neena began her artistic journey in the 1970s, performing in Marathi professional theatre and Hindi experimental theatre. Before that she debuted in a Marathi commercial play- Guntata Hruday He ! Later under the mentorship of the legendary Pt. Satyadev Dubey, she starred in acclaimed plays such as Adhe Adhure, Mayavi Sarovar, and Educating Rita. This was the time when she met husband Dilip Kulkarni, who was also actively involved in direction and acting in experimental and commercial theatre. Neena declined early film offers from renowned directors like V. Shantaram and Shakti Samanta to focus on stage work since she found her passion growing. Her breakthrough in Marathi theatre came in 1978 when Dr. Vijaya Mehta cast her as Shabbo in Hamidabai Chi Kothi, which began her long-standing association with Marathi theatre. Notable stage performances include Mahasagar, Savitri, Akasmat, Dhyani Mani, Vatvat Savitri, Dehabhaan, Prem Patra and now Asen me Nasen Me. As a director, she has helmed acclaimed play recreation called- Mahasagar. some hindi theatre plays like ‘doctor aap bhi’ and its marathi adaptation- doctor tumhi suddha was critically acclaimed. Naagmandal directed by her husband Dilip and matichya gaadaache prakaran were some semi experimental plays she acted in. Her notable work in English theatre is still remembered by theatre enthusiasts– some of those plays were - Educating Rita, Mahatma Versus Gandhi, and Wedding Album. She is currently in My name is Gauhar jaan- the play, as Malka jaan and older Gauhar jaan. Her work in Marathi cinema has been widely recognized. She received the Maharashtra State Film Award for Best Actress for Savat Mazi Ladki, and her performance in the lead role as Aai in Mahesh Manjrekar’s film Aai gained critical acclaim as well as box office hit! In 2005-2006, Neena produced her first film Shevri, which won the National Film Award for Best Feature Film in Marathi. She also played the lead character of Vidya Barve a middle class Marathi middle aged wife/mother/daughter struggling to survive in Mumbai amidst her divorce. She is forced to spend the night on the streets of Mumbai as she recounts her spree of turbulent relationships and decides to start her life afresh. This stands as Neena’s special role and project till date- as mentioned by her in some of her interviews. Neena has won a couple of Filmfare Awards Marathi for her roles in Bioscope and Mogara Phulala as Best Supporting Actress, and a filmfare Critics Award for Best Actress for Photo Prem. In Hindi cinema, she has acted in numerous successful films including Daag the fire, Nayak, Guru, Paheli, Hungama, Rann, Badal, bhootnath, Phir Bhi Dil Hai Hindustani, Hunterrr, Mere Yaar Ki Shaadi Hai, Hasee Toh Phasee, and Ghayal: Once Again. She is also known for her popular role in the television series Yeh Hai Mohabbatein which ran on star plus for 6-7 years at a stretch. she has also done a lot of TV shows in marathi where she played vital roles – one of them being Swarajya Janani Jijamata on sony marathi where she played the lead – Jijamata and the current show Yed Lagla Premache where she is fondly known as Jiji. Neena’s work on TV has been extensive since doordarshan days. She acted in some well known shows like – Chaal naavachi Vachaal Vasti, Saalsood, Nayak, Ank Ajoobe, ados pados. In the digital space, she earned acclaim for her role in the web series Breathe and in short films such as Cuddly, Maa, and Devi. And her latest work in ‘The Royals’ on Netflix. Her international work includes The Best Exotic Marigold Hotel, the French-language series Rani on France Deux, and the French feature film Noces, which premiered in Paris in 2017. In addition to her acting career, Neena Kulkarni is an accomplished writer. She penned a widely-read column titled Antarang in the Marathi daily Loksatta for over three years, which was later compiled into a published book. The book is doing its successful rounds of the 4th edition. Some of her marathi films with her offbeat yet adorable character roles are in the marathi films Kulkarni Chaukatla Deshpande by Gajendra Ahire, Pondicherry, directed by Sachin Kundalkar, and Medium Spicy, directed by Mohit Takalkar. Her lead role in the marathi film Photoprem was an official selection at the Indian Panorama (IFFI) and the Marathi competition at PIFF. Her most loved performances are in marathi films like Uttarayan and Sangeet Manapmaan, and Hindi films like - The signature, shastri Viruddh Shastri and OTT series like Unpaused and The good Karma Hospital season 3. Over her illustrious career, Neena Kulkarni has been honoured with a National Film Award, Maharashtra State Film Awards, and several Filmfare Awards Marathi, along with recognition from Natya Darpan and Jeevan Gaurav and Best actress in 2025 for Akhil bharatiya Natya Parishad. Her enduring contributions and the involvement in the entertainment business makes her a vital part of India's artistic legacy in both traditional and contemporary storytelling.

== Filmography ==
=== Films ===
Year	Title	Role	Language	Notes
1987	Mirch Masala	Pepper factory worker	Hindi	
1992	Hach Sunbaicha Bhau	Suman (Tarde)	Marathi	
1993	Savat Mazi Ladki	Seema Madhukar Hirve	Marathi	Maharashtra State Film Award for Best Actress; Nominated Filmfare Award for Best Actress – Marathi
1993	Ghayaal	Lalita Ramchandra Hire	Marathi	
1993	Taichya Bangdya	Vidya	Marathi	
1994	Purush	Madhura	Hindi	
1995	Aai	Sumitra A. Pradhan	Marathi	Nominated - Filmfare Award for Best Actress – Marathi
1996	Daayraa	Widow	Hindi	
1997	Hasari	Mother	Marathi	
1999	Daag: The Fire	Sushila Singh	Hindi	
2000	Dhaai Akshar Prem Ke	Amrit Y. Grewal	Hindi	
2000	Badal	Soni's mother	Hindi	
2000	Phir Bhi Dil Hai Hindustani	Laxmi	Hindi	
2001	Nayak: The Real Hero	Daksha Rao Gaekwad	Hindi	
2001	Hum Ho Gaye Aapke	Mrs. Gupta	Hindi	
2001	Rahul	Mrs. Sharma	Hindi	
2002	Kehtaa Hai Dil Baar Baar	Kamla Patel	Hindi	
2002	Kuch Tum Kaho Kuch Hum Kahein	Sunanda Singh	Hindi	
2002	Kyaa Dil Ne Kahaa	Esha's mother	Hindi	
2002	Mere Yaar Ki Shaadi Hai	Gayatri Sharma	Hindi	
2002	Ab Ke Baras	Prerna	Hindi	
2002	Kya Yehi Pyaar Hai	Rachna Patil	Hindi	
2003	Hungama	Jeetu's mom	Hindi	
2003	Dum	Saraswati Shinde	Hindi	
2004	Inspector Kiran	Accomplice	Hindi	
2004	Ishq Hai Tumse	Saeda Begum	Hindi	
2004	Pachhadlela	Ravi's mother	Marathi	
2004	Saatchya Aat Gharat	Madhura's mother	Marathi	
2004	Uttarayan	Durgi		Zee Chitra Gaurav Puraskar for Best Actress; Maharashtra State Film Award for Best Actress
2004	Ab... Bas!	Shivani 'Aai'	Hindi	
2005	Sarivar Sari	Aayi	Marathi	
2005	7 1/2 Phere: More Than a Wedding	Rati Pant	Hindi	
2005	Paheli	Mrs. Bhanwarlal	Hindi	
2005	Kyaa Kool Hai Hum	Shanti - Kiran's mom	Hindi	
2005	Yehi Hai Zindagi	Sharda Rao	Hindi	
2005	Aamhi Asu Ladke	Shalini Buddhisagar	Marathi	
2006	Shevri	Vidya Barve	Marathi	Also producer of the film National Film Award for Best Feature Film in Marathi
2006	Shaadi Karke Phas Gaya Yaar	Ayaan's grandma	Hindi	
2006	Humko Deewana Kar Gaye	Amrit H. Malhotra	Hindi	
2006	Ho Sakta Hai!	Shakuntala	Hindi	
2006	Nital	Neeraja's mother	Marathi	
2007	Raqeeb	Sophie's mother	Hindi	
2007	Guru	Sujata's mother	Hindi	
2007	Balirajache Rajya Yeu De	Bali's mother	Marathi	
2008	Bhoothnath	Nirmala Nath	Hindi	Cameo appearance
2009	Gho Mala Asla Hava	Savitri's mother	Marathi	
2009	Gandha	Janaki	Marathi	
2010	Rann	Lata V. Malik	Hindi	
2010	Mission 11 July	Police Commissioner's wife	Hindi	
2010	Ved Laavi Jeeva	Jaggu's mother	Marathi	
2010	Mee Sindhutai Sapkal	Bai	Marathi	
2011	Sahi Dhandhe Galat Bande	Tai	Marathi	
2011	Sharyat	Gayatri Devi	Marathi	
2011	The Best Exotic Marigold Hotel	Gaurika	English	
2012	Uproot	Laxmi	Hindi	Short film
2013	Anumati	Madhu	Marathi	
2013	Chasing the Rainbow	Sita	English	Short film
2013	Dilli Gang	Sujata	Hindi	
2014	Hasee Toh Phasee	Mrs. Bharadwaj	Hindi	
2014	Swami Public Ltd.	Neena	Marathi	
2015	Gour Hari Dastaan: The Freedom File	Mrs. Apte (Freedom Cell)	Hindi	
2015	Hunterrr	Mandar's mother	Hindi	
2015	Cuddly	Mother	Hindi	Short film
2015	Bioscope	Nirmaladevi Indori	Marathi	In segment "Dili E Nadaan"; Filmfare Award for Best Supporting Actress – Marathi
2016	Ghayal Once Again	Mrs. Joe D'souza	Hindi	
2016	A Wedding	Yelda Kazim	French / Urdu	
2017	Vaas	Kamal	Marathi	Short film
2019	Mogra Phulaalaa	Sunil's Mother	Marathi	Filmfare Award for Best Supporting Actress – Marathi
2019	Kulkarni Chaukatla Deshpande	Mother	Marathi	
2019	Bhai: Vyakti Ki Valli	Vijaya Mehta	Marathi	
2020	Devi	Savitri	Hindi	Short film
2020	AB Aani CD	Varsha Deshpande	Marathi	
2020	Raabta	Neena	Hindi	Short film
2020	Dafan	Dr. Vaze	Hindi	Short film
2021	Photo Prem	Maee	Marathi	Filmfare Critics Award for Best Actress – Marathi
2021	Godavari	Bhagirathi Deshmukh	Marathi	
2022	Pondicherry	Aai	Marathi	
2022	Medium Spicy	Meena Tipnis	Marathi	Nominated -Filmfare Award for Best Supporting Actress – Marathi
2022	Dagina	Sasubai	Marathi	Short film
2022	Three of Us	Mrs Kurankar	Hindi	
2023	Shastry Viruddh Shastry	Urmila Shastry	Hindi	
2024	The Signature	Madhu	Hindi	ZEE5 film
2025	Sangeet Manapmaan	Chimnabai	Marathi	

=== Theatre ===
- Guntata Hruday He (1972)
- Dehbhaan
- Hamidabai chi Kothi
- Dhyani Manee
- Naagmandal
- Sambhog Se Sanyas Tak
- Chhapa Kata as Uttara Bhagwat
- Mahatama Vs Gandhi
- Educating Rita
- Mahasagar as Champu
- Vat Vat Savitri
- Aai ch Ghar Unhacha
- Prem Patra
- Doctor Tumhi Suddha
- Asen Me Nasen Me

=== Television ===
- Jeena Isi Ka Naam Hai (2006) as Guest
- Kammal (2002–2003) as Rinni Sanyal/Raina Bose
- Kayamath (2007–2009) as Mrs. Shah / Dadi
- Mathemagic co-host with Benjamin Gilani on Doordarshan
- Baa Bahoo Aur Baby (2007) as Asha Ben (Guest appearance)
- Meri Maa (2011–2012) as Pratibha's mother-in-law
- Ek Packet Umeed (2008) as Ambika Dharamraj
- Devyani (2013) as Manjula Vikhe-Patil
- Yeh Hai Mohabbatein (2013–2019) as Madhavi "Madhu" Iyer
- Adhuri Ek Kahani (2004–2008) as Kalyani Kedarnath Patwardhan
- Ados Pados (1985) as Champakali
- Swarajyajanani Jijamata (2019–2021) as Rajmata Jijabai
- Raja Shivchhatrapati (2008–2009) as Badi Begum
- Saarrthi (2004–2005) as Kumud Goenka
- Breathe (2018) as Juliet Mascarenhas
- The Good Karma Hospital (season 3) (2019)
- The Kapil Sharma Show to promote Devi
- Swamini (2019–2020) as Tarabai
- Unpaused: Naya Safar (2022)
- Yed Lagla Premacha
- Ankakee (2001)
- Lajja (2010–2011) as Vasumati
- Rani (2011) as Queen Mother
- Unch Majha Zoka (2012–2013) as Aaji
- Ank Ajoobe
- Nayak
- Chaal Navachi Vachal Vasti

== Awards and nominations ==
Year	Award	Category	Work	Character	Result	Ref.
1994	Maharashtra State Film Awards	Maharashtra State Film Award for Best Actress	Savat Mazi Ladki	Seema Madhukar Hirve	Won	
1994	Filmfare Awards Marathi	Filmfare Award for Best Actress – Marathi	Savat Mazi Ladki	Seema Madhukar Hirve	Nominated	
1996	Filmfare Awards Marathi	Filmfare Award for Best Actress – Marathi	Aai		Nominated	
2005	Maharashtra State Film Awards	Maharashtra State Film Award for Best Actress	Uttarayan	Kusumawati / Durgi	Won	
2006	54th National Film Awards	National Film Award for Best Feature Film in Marathi	Shevri	Vidya Barve	Won	
2015	Filmfare Awards Marathi	Filmfare Award for Best Supporting Actress – Marathi	Taptapadi	Durgabai	Nominated	
2016	Filmfare Awards Marathi	Filmfare Award for Best Supporting Actress – Marathi	Bioscope		Won	
2020	Filmfare Awards Marathi	Filmfare Award for Best Supporting Actress – Marathi	Mogra Phulaalaa	Sunil's mother	Won	
2021	Filmfare Awards Marathi	Filmfare Critics Award for Best Actress – Marathi	Photo Prem		Won	
2022	Filmfare Awards Marathi	Filmfare Award for Best Supporting Actress – Marathi	Medium Spicy	Nissim' mother	Nominated	
2025	Akhil Bharatiya Marathi Natya Parishad	Lifetime Achievement Award			Won	
