= Gajendra Ahire =

Indian Marathi film maker and screenwriter

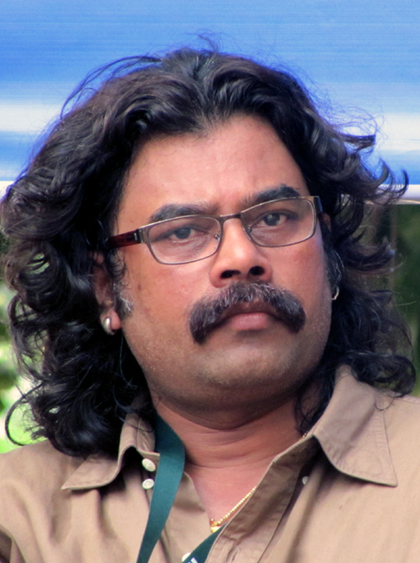
- Born: Gajendra Vitthal Ahire; 16 February 1969 (age 57); Mumbai, Maharashtra, India
- Occupations: Film director, producer, screenwriter, lyricist
- Years active: 1996–present
- Spouse: Vrinda Ahire (Actress)
- Children: Chintamani Ahire

Gajendra Vitthal Ahire is a National Award winner Indian film maker and screenwriter. He is noted for his work in Marathi cinema, theater, and television. He won the Silver Lotus Award at the 51st National Film Awards for his debut film Not Only Mrs. Raut in 2003, and National award for the Best Feature Film in Marathi for Shevri in 2006. He has also worked as a television screenwriter for programs such as Shrimaan-Shrimati.

He is highly active in theater field for which he has been recognized by Government of India, Government of Maharashtra and various Institutions across India and abroad for thirty years.

== Personal life ==
Gajendra Ahire was born on February 16, 1969, in Nashik was brought up in Mumbai. He is married to Marathi cinema actress Vrinda Ahire, with whom he has a son.

== Career ==
He began his career as a playwright at the age of 23. His first play was Aaicha Ghar Unhacha in which he also worked as an actor. After that, he wrote plays like Unch Maza Jhoka Ga, Ek Diwas Yeilach, and Janmasiddha. After 20 years of working in Marathi Cinema, he returned to theater with Shevgyachya Shenga.

After his initial plays, he moved to television and wrote more than 2000 episodes for Hindi and Marathi TV Serials. Out of which 'Shrimaan Shrimati' of Balaji Telefilms is one of his notable works.

Later, he began directing films and appearing in several significant roles in Marathi Feature Films. His first movie was 2002's 'Krishna Katachi Mira' which was not released. However, this movie won 3 Maharashtra State Film Awards for Best Actress, Best Singer (Male) and Best Singer (Female). His first released film was 'Not Only Mrs. Raut' which won numerous awards including Silver Lotus Award and Maharashtra State Film Award.

He also has contributed as music director for his NYIFF award-winning film, Anumati.

In 2019, Gajendra Ahire directed his 50th film Kulkarni Chaukatla Deshpande, a drama starring Sai Tamhankar in titular role.

== Awards ==
=== Filmfare Awards 2014 (Marathi) ===
- 2015 - CRITICS' BEST FILM - Shared with Paresh Mokashi (Elizabeth Ekadashi) for Postcard

=== Stuttgart Indian Film Festival ===
- 2015 - The Director's Vision Award for 'The Silence'

== National Film Awards ==
- 2007 - Best Feature Film in Marathi Shevri

== Silver Lotus Awards ==
- 2003 - Not Only Mrs. Raut
- 2006 - Shevri

== Maharashtra State Film Awards ==
- 17 awards in total for film, writing, direction, lyrics, dialogues
- Best Director to handle 'Social Subject'
- Best Director to handle 'Rural Subject'

== New York Indian Film Festival [Nyiff] ==
- 2013 - 'Anumati' awarded Best Feature Film

== Mama Varerkar Smriti Award ==
- 1994 Marathi Play 'Aaicha Ghar Unhacha'

== Filmography ==
=== Marathi films ===
Year	Film	Contribution	Notes
2003	Krishna Katachi Mira	Director, Story, Screenplay, Dialogue, Lyrics	
2003	Not Only Mrs. Raut	Director, Story, Screenplay, Dialogue, Lyrics	Silver Lotus Award
2003	Vitthal Vitthal	Director, Story, Screenplay, Dialogue, Lyrics	
2004	Pandhar	Director, Story, Screenplay, Dialogue, Lyrics	
2004	Kandobachya Navan	Director, Story, Screenplay, Dialogue, Lyrics	
2005	Sarivar Sari	Director, Story, Screenplay, Dialogue, Lyrics	
2006	Sail	Director, Story, Screenplay, Dialogue, Lyrics	
2006	Diwasen diwas	Director, Story, Screenplay, Dialogue, Lyrics	
2006	Shevri	Director, Story, Screenplay, Dialogue, Lyrics	Silver Lotus Award for Best Film; "Sant Tukaram" Best Marathi Feature Film award at PIFF; Actor Dilip Prabhavalkar won National Film Award for Best Supporting Actor
	Housefull	Director, Story, Screenplay, Dialogue, Lyrics	
2007	Vasudev Balwat Phadke	Director, Story, Screenplay, Dialogue, Lyrics	
2008	Chanda	Director, Story, Screenplay, Dialogue, Lyrics	
2008	Maay Baap	Director, Story, Screenplay, Dialogue, Lyrics	
2008	Summer Days	Director, Story, Screenplay, Dialogue, Lyrics	
2008	Anand Bhuvan	Director, Story, Screenplay, Dialogue, Lyrics	
2008	Bayo	Director, Story, Screenplay, Dialogue, Lyrics	
2008	Chance	Director, Story, Screenplay, Dialogue, Lyrics	
2008	Sawar re	Director, Story, Screenplay, Dialogue, Lyrics	
2009	Popcorn	Director, Story, Screenplay, Dialogue, Lyrics	
2009	Gulmohar	Director, Story, Screenplay, Dialogue, Lyrics	
2009	Sumbaran	Director, Story, Screenplay, Dialog, Lyrics	
2010	Paradh	Director, Story, Screenplay, Dialog, Lyrics	
2011	Hello Jai Hind!	Director, Story, Screenplay, Dialog, Lyrics	
2011	Naati Goti	Director, Story, Screenplay, Dialog, Lyrics	
2011	Tya Ratri Paus Hota	Director, Story, Screenplay, Dialog, Lyrics	
2011	Samudra	Director, Story, Screenplay, Dialog, Lyrics	
2011	Saale Lower Middle Class	Director, Story, Screenplay, Dialog, Lyrics	
2011	Eka Shabdat Sangto	Director, Story, Screenplay, Dialog, Lyrics	
2012	Pipaani	Director, Story, Screenplay, Dialog, Lyrics	
2013	Touring Talkies	Director, Story, Screenplay, Dialog, Lyrics	
2013	Anudini	Director, Story, Screenplay, Dialog, Lyrics	
2013	Postcard	Director, Story, Screenplay, Dialog, Lyrics	
2013	Anvatt	Director, Story, Screenplay, Dialog, Lyrics	
2013	Anumati	Director, Story, Screenplay, Dialog, Lyrics, Music	Best Feature Film at Nyiff; Debut as Music Director
2013	Postcard.	Director, Story, Screenplay, Dialog, Lyrics	Postcard Written & Directed Marathi Nominated For best Director Award at the New York Indian Film Festival
2013	Simhaasan	Director, Story, Screenplay, Dialog, Lyrics	
2014	Swami Public Ltd.	Director, Story, Screenplay, Dialog, Lyrics	
2014	Chuup	Director, Story, Screenplay, Dialog, Lyrics	
2015	Bioscope	Director, Dialogue	
2015	Nilkanth Master	Director, Story, Screenplay, Dialog, Lyrics	
2015	Shasan	Director, Screenplay, Writer	Released on 22 October 2015
2015	The Silence	Director, Story, Screenplay, Dialog, Lyrics	Post-production Winner of The German Star of India 2015 in the category Director's Vision
2019	Kulkarni Chaukatla Deshpande	Director, Story, Screenplay, Dialog, Lyrics	Releasing 22 November
2019	Sohalla	Director, Story	
2021	Bidi Bakda	Director, Story, Screenplay, Dialog, Lyrics	Releasing 2024
2021	Saajinde	Director, Story, Screenplay, Dialog, Lyrics	Released
2021	GodaKaath	Director, Story, Screenplay, Dialog, Lyrics	
2022	Pinga	Director, Story, Screenplay, Dialog, Lyrics	
2022	Vidyapeeth	Director, Story, Screenplay, Dialog, Lyrics	
2022	Dear Molly	Director, Story, Screenplay, Dialog, Lyrics	Released
2022	Shrimati Umbrella	Director, Story, Screenplay, Dialog, Lyrics	
2022	Return Journey	Director, Story, Screenplay, Dialog, Lyrics	
2023	Snow Flower	Director, Story, Screenplay, Dialog, Lyrics	Cast : Chaya Kadam
2024	Portrait	Director, Story, Screenplay, Dialog, Lyrics	Goda
2026	Papyachya Pinkichi Lovestory	Director, Story, Screenplay, Dialog, Lyrics	

=== Hindi films ===
Year	Title	Contribution	Notes
2008.	Chanda	Director, Story, Screenplay, Dialog, Lyrics.	na na
2011	Just 47	Director, Story, Screenplay, Dialog, Lyrics	
2022.	Sadabahar	Director, Story, Screenplay, Dialog, Lyrics	
2023	The Signaure	Director, Story, Screenplay, Dialog, Lyrics	Cast : Aupam Kher
2024	Zindagi Namkeen	Director, Story, Screenplay, Dialog, Lyrics	Cast : Shreyas Talpade
2024	Paro	Director, Story, Screenplay, Dialog, Lyrics	cast : trupti bhoir

== Theater ==
Year	Name	Language	Contribution	Notes
1993-94	Aaicha Ghar Unhacha	Marathi	Writer, actor	Debut as a writer and actor; Mama Varerkar Smruti Award; Actress Neena Kulkarni won Best Actress Award, Pune Gaurav, Nirmata Sangh
94-95	Unch Maza Jhoka Ga	Marathi	Writer	
95-96	Ek Diwas Yeilach	Marathi	Writer	
98-2005	Janmasiddha	Marathi	Writer	
2015	Shevgyachya Shenga	Marathi	Writer, director	

== Television ==
Year	Name	Contribution	Language	Notes
1998	Shrimaan Shrimati	Screenwriting	Hindi	na
