= Deshpande =

Deshpande is a surname native to the Indian states of Karnataka, and Maharashtra. The surname can be also found in some parts of Himachal Pradesh. Deshpande surname is found among the Deshastha Brahmins, Gaud Saraswat Brahmins (GSB) and the Chandraseniya Kayastha Prabhus (CKP).

== Etymology ==
The name Deshpande is believed to be a combination of two words (Desh and Pande). Desh means a country or a territory or a group of villages. Pande means one who maintains records or accounts. So Deshpande means one who maintains accounts or records at a territory level or district level.

== Deshpande as a title for district revenue records ==
Deshpande was a historical title given to a person who was appointed as accountant to a territory of land. The title dates back to medieval Deccan sultanates and Maratha Empire era. It was a title conferred on officers responsible for record keeping at Pargana level. The administrative chief of the pargana was called Deshmukh. Their equivalent at village level were Kulkarni (accountant) and Patil (Village chief). The Deshpande, in collaboration with the Deshmukh, was responsible for collecting revenue and sitting in the judicial assembly, and to write and keep various records at the district level. As literacy was an essential qualification for the work, the office was generally occupied by literate classes such as brahmins. The deshmukhs and Deshpandes had hereditary lands liable to low rates of land revenues. For deshpande's apart from the collection of land revenue, there was a little outside control over the affairs of the village, which were largely managed by panch or council of leading villagers, including the patil, the kulkarni or village accountant, other village officials and leading land holders.

According to Maharashtra State Gazetteers,

The Deshpande was next to the Deshmukh of the district and hence used to keep the entire accounts of the pargana revenue.They used to maintain a register of lands of pargana showing the owner's of the land and the revenue to be paid by them.Sometimes a Deshpande was also called as Deshkulkarni. It is possible that this term preceded the Deshpande so commonly found in the Berar. The important permanent officers in the village were the Patil or the Mokaddam and the Kulkarni. Sometimes despande's duties were similar to those of the Deshmukh in the paragana i.e., collecting land revenue of the village, maintaining law and order, settling petty disputes etc.

== Abolition of Deshpande Watans ==
The Vatandar system was abolished after the independence of India in 1947, when the government confiscated most of the land of the Deshmukhs, Deshpandes, and Patils. In Maharashtra,

All Patil, Kulkarni, Deshmukh and Deshpande Watans and all inferior village Watans were abolished under the Maharashtra revenue patels (abolition of office) Act 1962, Bombay pargana and Kulkarni Watans Abolition Act 1950 and the Bombay inferior village watans abolition act 1958.

== Notable people ==
- Bapuji Mudgal Deshpande – general in the early Maratha Empire, best remembered for his major role during first and second recapturing attempts of "Kondhana" fort in 1647 and 1656 respectively.
- Baji Prabhu Deshpande, general and commander for Shivaji, known for the Battle of Pavan Khind.
- Murarbaji Deshpande, commander of Chhatrapati Shivaji Maharaj, who is immortalized for his valor & bravery at the Battle of Purandar
- C. D. Deshpande (1912–1999), an Indian geographer, author, educationist, and writer.
- Nirmala Deshpande, Indian social activist and a Padmashri award winner (2005).
- P. L. Deshpande (known as Pu. La. Deshpande); Marathi writer, playwright, actor, and songwriter.
- Vasantrao Deshpande – Hindustani classical music vocalist, contributed especially to Hindustani classical and Natya Sangeet.
- Ganesh Trimbak Deshpande – Indian writer, scholar; Winner of Sahitya Akademi Award.
- Arvind Deshpande (1932–1987) – Marathi stage actor. Husband of actress Sulabha Deshpande
- Sulabha Deshpande (1937–2016) -Marathi and Hindi stage and film actor and director
- Gururao Deshpande – known as Gayanacharya, Hindustani classical music singer from Karnataka, India; avid reader, an astrologist.
- Rahul Deshpande – Hindustani classical music vocalist, grandson of late Kai. Pt. Vasantrao Deshpande.
- Satyasheel Deshpande – Hindustani classical music vocalist, a disciple of Pt. Kumar Gandharva and son of Vamanrao Deshpande.
- Ashwini Bhide-Deshpande – Hindustani classical music vocalist of the Jaipur-Atrauli Gharana.
- Gururaj Deshpande – Indian-American businessman, co-founder and chairman of Sycamore Networks and chairman of A123 Systems, founder of Deshpande Foundation.
- Bhavurao Venkatrao Deshpande – a late senior leader of the Bharatiya Janata Party (BJP), one of the founding fathers of BJP in Karnataka.
- Ramakant Krishnaji Deshpande – Indian surgical oncologist, pioneer of thoracoscopic surgery at the Tata Memorial Hospital, awarded with Padma Shri for contributions to medicine.
- Govind Purushottam Deshpande – (known as GoPu or GPD) Marathi playwright and academic, economist, anthologist from Nashik, Maharashtra.
- Gauri Deshpande – novelist, short story writer, and poet from Maharashtra, India.
- Kusumavati Deshpande – (1904–1961) Marathi writer from Amravati, Maharashtra, India.
- Anagha Deshpande – cricketer who has played in 20 women's One Day Internationals and seven Twenty20 internationals for India.
- Arun Deshpande – a coach of the Indian Carrom team.
- V. G. Deshpande – Indian politician, former general secretary of Akhil Bharatiya Hindu Mahasabha.
- Makarand Deshpande – actor, writer, and director in Hindi and Marathi films and theatre, often playing supporting yet pivotal roles.
- Mrunmayee Deshpande – actress of Hindi Bollywood and Marathi films and TV Serials; an established leading actress in Marathi cinema and an accomplished dancer, and writer.
- Tara Deshpande – actress, writer, former model and MTV VJ, known for Is Raat Ki Subah Nahin, Kaizad Gustad's Bombay Boys.
- Sunita Deshpande – Marathi writer, wife of Pu La Deshpande, known for आहे मनोहर तरी... (Ahe Manohar Tari...), प्रिय जी.ए. (Priya G. A.), etc.
- Madhav Kashinath Deshpande – Marathi writer, a renowned professor of English language and literature, known for novel Aadhar (अंधार) (1953), Priya Kavite (प्रिय कविते) (1972).
- Prerana Deshpande – exponents of Kathak dance in India, student of Rohini Bhate, of Lucknow and Jaipur gharanas.
- Shashi Deshpande – writer of novels, essays, and children's books.
- Gangadharrao Deshpande, known for Indian independence movement against British colonial rule
- Anil Deshpande, Indian cricketer
- Priyanka Deshpande, Indian television presenter
- Gautami Deshpande, actress
- Tushar Deshpande, upcoming and talented cricketeer
- Nilendra Ganesh Deshpande, American theoretical physicist and academic

== See also ==
- Marathi people
- Maratha clan system
