= Sinhagad (1923 film) =

- Directed by: V. Shantaram; Baburao Painter
- Written by: Hari Narayan Apte (novel)
- Screenplay by: Baburao Painter
- Starring: Baburao Painter; V. Shantaram; Vithaldas Panchotia
- Cinematography: Sheikh Fattelal
- Production company: Maharashtra Film Company
- Release date: 11 November 1923
- Country: India
- Languages: Silent (Marathi and English intertitles)

Sinhagad is a 1923 Indian silent historical drama film jointly directed by V. Shantaram an Baburao Painter based on Hari Narayan Apte's Marathi novel Gad Aala Pan Sinh Gela, on the legendary Battle of Sinhagad. This film was released on 11 November 1923 under the banner of Maharashtra Film Company.

== Plot ==
The film is based on the 1670 Battle of Sinhagad. Shivaji, leader of the Maratha Empire, tries to recapture the strategic fort of Kondhana from the Mughal forces. His trusted commander Tanaji Malusare lead the battle for Maratha to victory but he was martyed in the battle.

== Cast ==
- Baburao Painter
- V. Shantaram
- Vithaldas Panchotia
- Kamala Devi
- Balasaheb Yadav
- Zunzharrao Pawar
- Keshavrao Dhaiber
