= Subhedar =

- Theatrical release poster
- Directed by: Digpal Lanjekar
- Written by: Digpal Lanjekar
- Based on: Tanaji Malusare
- Produced by: Pradyot Pendharkar; Anil Warkhade; Digpal Lanjekar; Chinmay Mandlekar; Shramik Gojamgude; Vinod Jawalkar; Shruti Daund; Nishid Jawalkar; Aniket Jawalkar
- Starring: Chinmay Mandlekar; Mrinal Kulkarni; Ajay Purkar; Sameer Dharmadhikari; Mrunmayee Deshpande
- Cinematography: Priyanka Mayekar
- Edited by: Sagar Shinde; Vinay Shinde
- Music by: Devdutta Manisha Baji
- Production companies: Mulakshar Productions; Raajwarasa Productions; Prithviraj Productions; Rajau Productions; Parampara Productions
- Distributed by: AA Films; Everest Entertainment
- Release date: 25 August 2023
- Running time: 154 minutes
- Country: India
- Language: Marathi
- Budget: ₹10 crore
- Box office: ₹18 crore

Subhedar is a 2023 Indian Marathi-language historical drama film written and directed by Digpal Lanjekar, a fifth installment of Shivraj Ashtak tracing the life of Subedar Tanaji Malusare starring Chinmay Mandlekar, Mrinal Kulkarni, Ajay Purkar in the leading roles. The film was produced by Mulakshar Productions, Raajwarasa Productions, Prithviraj Productions, Rajau Productions, Parampara Productions, and it was distributed by AA Films and Everest Entertainment.

Subhedar was announced in 2022 by Digpal Lanjekar with a film poster supposed to be released in June 2023. A new release date was announced on 21 June 2023 through a teaser. The first look poster of Ajay Purkar as Tanaji Malusare, revealed by Digpal Lanjekar on 30 June 2023. The film's release was preponed from 25 August to 18 August, but due to technical issues it was released in theaters on its original date.

It was released theatrically on 25 August 2023. It opened to positive reviews from critics as well the audience. The film grossed over ₹18 crore worldwide, becoming the second highest grossing Marathi film of 2023.

== Plot ==
Subedar Tanaji Malusare leaves Raiba's marriage and first goes to battle to conquer Kondhana fort and fights like a lion, after conquering the fort the fort is named Sinhagad.

== Cast ==
- Chinmay Mandlekar as Chatrapati Shivaji Maharaj
- Mrinal Kulkarni as Jijau
- Ajay Purkar as Tanaji Malusare
- Digvijay Rohidas as Udaybhan Rathod
- Smita Shewale as Savitri Malusare
- Uma Sardeshmukh as Matoshri Parvatibai Malusare
- Sameer Dharmadhikari as Shelar Mama
- Abhijeet Shwetchandra as Suryaji Malusare
- Nupur Daithankar as Soyarabai
- Digpal Lanjekar as Bahirji Naik
- Shrikant Prabhakar as Moropant
- Bipin Surve as Baji Sarjerao Jedhe
- Virajas Kulkarni as Jeeva
- Bhushan Shivtare as Yesaji Kank
- Sunil Jadhav as Veer Baji Yashvantrao Pasalkar
- Mrunmayee Deshpande as Keshar
- Purnanand Wadhekar as Navalaji
- Aniket Bandal as Sambhaji Jedhe
- Arnav Pendhrkar as Rayba Malusare
- Shivani Rangole as Yashodabai Malusare
- Astad Kale as Vishwas
- Rishi Saxena as Kubad Khan
- Dnyanesh Wadekar as Achal Singh
- Nikhil Jogdand as Sardar Shilimkar
- Alka Kubal as Jana Garadhin (Guest appearance)

== Production ==
Subhedar was filmed in four weeks and the film wrapped in March 2023.

== Release ==
=== Theatrical ===
The film was theatrically released on 25 August 2023. It received more than 900 shows in more than 350 theaters in the state of Maharashtra and in various cities of the country, it was also released in six other countries.

=== Home media ===
The film was digitally released on 22 September 2023 on Amazon Prime Video.

== Soundtrack ==
All lyrics are written by Digpal Lanjekar; all music is composed by Devdatta Manisha Baji.

Track listing
No.	Title	Singer (s)	Length
1.	"Maval Jaga Zala Ra"	Devdatta Manisha Baji	4:30
2.	"Aale Marathe"	Devdatta Manisha Baji, Suvarna Rathod	4:45
3.	"Halad"	Rohit Raut, Nidhi Hegde	4:10
4.	"Jijau Prashasti"	Poonam Godbole, Bhagyashree Abhyankar, Nidhi Hegde, Manasee Dixit, Shruti Deosthali, Suvarna Koli	3:04
Total length:			16:29

== Reception ==
=== Critical reception ===
Rucha Vaze of Lokmat gave the film four stars out of five praised the Lanjekar's direction said, "once again brilliantly shown the story of another warrior through his eyes". Sayali Koulgekar of Zee 24 Taas also gave same rating, concluded that the magnificence of cinema is understood through the costumes, acting, location. A reviewer from The Times of India rated the film three stars out of five and wrote "the film does stand out for its execution." Shubham Kulkarni of Koimoi said, "Subhedar does get dull." Akhilesh Neralekar of Loksatta wrote, "It is not a perfect historical film but it is a masterpiece that carefully studies the history and presents an interesting plot to the people which should be enjoyed by every audience."

=== Box office ===
The film collected ₹1.5 crore net on its opening day. In the first weekend it grossed ₹5.1 crore. The film collected over ₹8.74 crore in first week. In ten days film crossed ₹10 crore mark. The film was grossed over ₹18 crore at the box office worldwide.

== See also ==
- Battle of Sinhagad
