= Sinhagad (1933 film) =

- Directed by: V. Shantaram
- Written by: Narayan Hari Apte
- Produced by: Prabhat Film Company
- Starring: Master Vinayak; Keshavrao Dhaiber; Baburao Pendharkar; Shankarrao Bhosle
- Cinematography: V. Avadhoot; Keshavrao Dhaiber
- Music by: Govindrao Tembe
- Production company: Prabhat Film Company
- Release date: 1933
- Running time: 134 minutes
- Country: India
- Language: Marathi

Sinhagad is a 1933 Marathi film directed by V. Shantaram. The production company was Prabhat Film Company. The story was based on Hari Narayan Apte's literary classic novel "Gad Ala Pan Sinha Gela" (I Won The Fort But Lost A Lion). Apte was a famous Marathi novelist of the early twentieth century. The story's screenplay and dialogue were written by Narayan Hari Apte. The cinematographers were V. Avadhoot and Keshavrao Dhaiber. The cast included Master Vinayak, Baburao Pendharkar, Keshavrao Dhaiber, Leela Chandragiri, Shinde, Prabhavati, Budasaheb and Shankarrao Bhosle.

The film though based on the classic, followed the schematic pattern of the earlier silent film version by Baburao Painter Sinhagad (1923), and was based on Maratha Emperor Shivaji's Lieutenant, the Koli Maratha warrior Tanaji Malusare The screenplay writer for both films was Narayan Hari Apte.

== Plot ==
Udaybhanu (Baburao Pendharkar) captures Kamlakumari who is planning to commit Sati and brings her to his fort in Kondana. Tanaji Malusare prepares to attack the fort with fifty soldiers. He manages to scale it but is killed in the battle with Udaybhanu. Shivaji arrives and wins the fort but he is despondent on losing his most trusted Lieutenant.

== Cast ==
- Master Vinayak
- Shankarrao Bhosle as Tanaji Malusure
- Baburao Pendharkar as Udaybhanu
- Kamaladevi
- Bazarbattoo
- G. R. Mane
- Vaghya The Dog
- Miss Kamla Devi
- Ibrahim
- Rahim Miyan
- Keshavrao Dhaiber

== Soundtrack ==
The music director of the film was Govindrao Tembe. The popular songs from the film were Mard Maratha Mawalcha and Jyaachi Kirti Saarya Jagaat.
