= Udaybhan Rathod =

Mughal soldier

Udaybhan Rathod was a Mughal commander. He held Purandar Fort following the Treaty of Purandar (1665). He fought in the Battle of Sinhagad against Maratha Confederacy forces led by Maratha warrior Tanaji Malusare. Tanaji and Udaybhan engaged in combat against each other before being killed in the battle.

== In popular culture ==
=== Films and television ===
- In 1933, he was depicted by actor Baburao Pendharkar in the movie Sinhagad.
- In 2020, he was depicted by actor Saif Ali Khan in the movie Tanhaji.
- In 2023, he was depicted by actor Digvijay Rohidas in the movie Subhedar.
