= Tanaji =

Tanaji is a given name. Notable people with the name include:

- Tanaji Malusare (died 1670), military leader of the Maratha Empire
  - Tanhaji, 2020 Indian biographical film on the life of Tanaji Malusare
- Tanaji Sakharamji Mutkule, Indian Marathi politician
- Tanaji Sawant, Indian Marathi politician
