= Battle of Sinhagad =

1670 battle between Maratha and Mughal forces

Battle of Sinhagad (Kondhana)
- Part of The Maratha rebellion
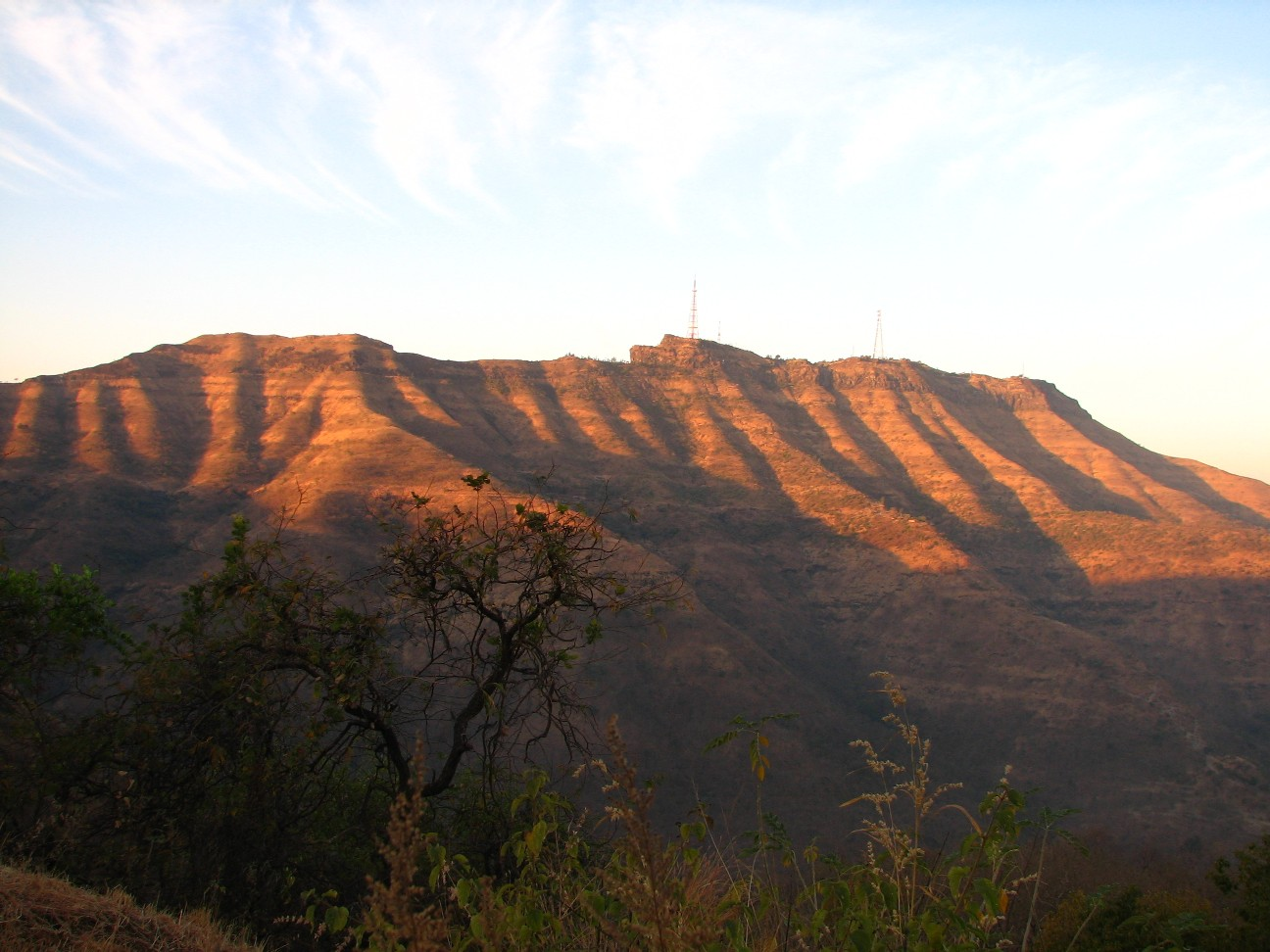
- The Fort of Sinhagad
Date	4 February 1670
Location	Fort Sinhagad, near Pune, India
Result	Maratha victory
Territorial changes	Fort of Sinhagad captured by Marathas

Belligerents
Maratha kingdom	Mughal Empire

Commanders and leaders
Tanaji Malusare †	Udaybhan Rathod †

The Battle of Sinhagad, also known as Battle of Kondhana, involved an attack by Marathas during the night of 4 February 1670 on the Mughal fort of Sinhagad (then Kondhana), near the city of Pune, Maharashtra. The Marathas captured the fort.

== Battle ==
Sinhagad was one of the first forts which Shivaji recaptured from the Mughals following the treaty of Purandar. The capture was made possible by scaling the walls at night with rope ladders. Tanaji Malusare was killed, but the fort was captured by the Marathas. The battle and Tanaji's exploits are the basis of a popular Marathi ballad.

== Aftermath ==
When Shivaji was informed about the victory and the loss of Tanaji's life during the battle, he is said to have exclaimed "गड आला पण सिंह गेला" (IAST: Gaḍa ālā paṇa siṃha gela English: The fort has been captured but we lost the lion). A bust of Tanaji Malusare was installed at the fort in memory of his contribution and sacrifice. On 14 December 1684, Abdul Qadir son-in-law of Mukhlis Khan captured the fort and placed Abdul Karim in charge of it.

== In popular culture ==
- Tanhaji - a Hindi movie of 2020, starring Ajay Devgan, depicted the battle of Kondhana.
- Raja Shivchatrapati - a Marathi TV serial of Star Pravah had episodes about this battle.
- Subhedar - a Marathi movie of 2023, starring Chinmay Mandlekar, depicted the battle of Kondhana
- Sinhagad (1933 film) - a Marathi film based on Battle of Sinhagad directed by V. Shantaram
- Sinhagad (1923 film) - Indian silent film
