= Bapuji Mudgal Deshpande =

Maratha general (1608–1665)

- बापुजी मुदगल देशपांडे
- Born: 1608
- Died: 1665 (aged 56–57)
- Children: Keso Narayan Deshpande (son)
- Military career
- Allegiance: Maratha Empire
- Rank: General
- Conflicts: Capture of Kondhana (1647)

Bapuji Mudgal Prabhu Deshpande (Marathi: बापुजी मुदगल देशपांडे; 1608–1665) was a general who served Chhatrapati Shivaji Maharaj.

== Early life ==
The Deshpande family warriors didn't have firm direction before 1636 and were engaged in battles where they would sometimes ally with Adilshah or with Nizamshah. The Deshpande family had a light infantry of 500 people, consisting of local Mahadev Koli, Ramoshi and Marathas.

It was 1636 when the family met Jijabai, Konde Deshmukh and Dadoji Konddeo, and offered their own Wada for stay to the Bhonsales.

Bapuji Prabhu's father Mudgalrao Prabhu belonged to this family that came from the Chandraseniya Kayastha Prabhu community. The family's original name was Jaywant and its sub-branch being Narhekar, and later obtained the name Deshpande because they were the Deshpandes of Khedebare appointed by Nizam Shahis of Ahmadnagar.

== Shivapur Village ==
This family supported and encouraged idea of new village development of Khed Shivapur.

== First recapturing of Kondhana in 1647 ==
By using force of his military, Bapuji removed Adilshahi, the Kiladar of Kondhana, and started Swarajya’s rule over there. Later, Muse Khan made complaint to Adilshaha about this incident. As a response, Sultan sent small army, headed by the Ghorpades (who used to hate Bhonsale family), but Bapuji Mudgal Deshpande, Dadoji Konddeo and 18-year-old Shivaji convinced Ghorpade about their action, Ghorpades believed to punish Dadoji Konddeo by cutting his one hand as he sided the Bhonsale’s wing in spite of servant of Adilshah.

== Second recapturing of Kondhana in 1656 ==
After giving Kondhana fort to Adilshaha in 1650, Shivaji realized the need to have control of this strategically important fort near Pune. He ordered Bapuji to look on to this matter. Bapuji had unique idea to handle this issue without war, he convinced Muslim Kiladar of Kondhana by offering huge “Inam” tax free land near Khed Shivapur village in return of this fort’s control and thus avoided battle and blood lash. Shivaji got so impressed when he came to know the way by which Bapuji got this fort, he paid good reward to him and kept “Karkhanishi” of fort to Deshpande family.

== Later life and inheritance ==
His son Keso Narayan Deshpande fought in Purandar fort’s battle during 1670 and successfully recaptured this fort but was killed in the battle at the hands of Mirad Khan, the Kiladar of Purandar. Later Shivaji awarded the administrative post Mujumdari of Purandar fort and area from Pune to Baramati to Niliopant Mujumdar of Pune.
