= Suryaji Malusare =

- Subhedar

Subhedar of Maratha Empire
- Reign: 1670–?
- Predecessor: Tanaji Malusare
- Allegiance: Maratha Empire
- Monarch: Shivaji
- Religion: Hinduism
- Occupation: Subhedar
- Military career
- Conflicts: Battle of Sinhagad; Recapture of Purandar; Dakshina Digvijaya

Suryaji Malusare was the younger brother of Tanaji Malusare. He is known for his contribution after the death of Tanaji in the Battle of Sinhagad. He was made Subhedar of Mavala forces after the death of Tanaji Malusare.

== Early life ==
Suryaji Malusare was the younger brother of Tanaji Malusare born to his father Kaloji Malusare. Just like Tanaji, Suryaji also helped Shivaji in his revolt and was a prominent sardar under him.

== Military career ==
=== Battle of Sinhagad ===
In 1670, a force consisting of five hundred Mavala soldiers launched a surprise night assault on the fort, defended by twelve hundred Rajput soldiers under Udaybhan Rathod's command. During the battle, Tanaji, and Udaybhan fought with swords and both perished in the duel. After Tanaji was killed, his brother Suryaji commanded the remaining Mavalas since Tanaji was dead. A signal flame was lighted on high upon the fort to inform Shivaji of their victory from Rajgad.

=== Later career ===
After the Fall of Sinhagad, the Marathas captured Purandar and other lost fortresses under Suryaji Malusare. Suryaji also accompanied Shivaji Maharaj in this southern Campaign.

== In popular culture ==
=== Films and television ===
- He was portrayed by Ramesh Paradeshi in the 2019 Indian Marathi-language historical film Fatteshikast.
- He was portrayed by Abhijeet Shwetchandra in the 2023 Indian Marathi-language historical film Subhedar.

== See also ==
- Tanaji Malusare
- Battle of Sinhagad
- Maratha Empire
