= Nag Nayak of Sinhagad =

Rana of Sinhagad until 1328

Nag Nayak
- Rana

Rana of Sinhagad
- Reign: late 13th century–1328
- Successor: Muhammad bin Tughluq
- Died: 1328; Sinhagad
- Issue: Mai Nayak
Names
- Rana Nag Nayak Koli of Sinhagad
- Religion: Hinduism

Nag Nayak (died 1328) was an Indian monarch who lived and reigned from the late 13th century to the early 14th century, achieving the title of Rana. He hailed from Sinhagad, an ancient mountain fortress previously known as Kondhana, located roughly 35km southwest of the city of Pune, India

Nag Nayak was worshipped as a symbol of strength and held power over the strategically important mountain fortress Sinhagad. It is said that he resisted an eight month attack from the Delhi Sultanate, which stretched over large parts of the Indian subcontinent. Under the orders of Sultan Muhammad bin Tughluq of the Delhi sultanate, the attack raged until Nag Nayak's death in 1328, at which point Tughluq seized the fortress.
