= Tanhaji =

2020 Indian film by Om Raut

- Directed by: Om Raut
- Written by: Prakash Kapadia; Ajay Devgn
- Produced by: Ajay Devgn; Bhushan Kumar; Krishan Kumar
- Starring: Ajay Devgn; Kajol; Saif Ali Khan
- Narrated by: Sanjay Mishra
- Cinematography: Keiko Nakahara
- Edited by: Dharmendra Sharma
- Music by: Score: Sandeep Shirodkar; Songs: Ajay–Atul; Sachet–Parampara; Mehul Vyas; Prasenjit Kosambi
- Production companies: T-Series Films; Ajay Devgn FFilms
- Distributed by: AA Films
- Release date: 10 January 2020 (India)
- Running time: 135 minutes
- Country: India
- Language: Hindi
- Budget: ₹150 crore
- Box office: est. ₹367.65 crore

Tanhaji: The Unsung Warrior is a 2020 Indian Hindi-language epic historical action film directed by Om Raut and produced by Bhushan Kumar, Krishan Kumar and Ajay Devgn under T-Series Films and Ajay Devgn FFilms. Tracing the life of Maratha warrior Tanaji Malusare, it stars Ajay Devgn as the eponymous lead, Kajol and Saif Ali Khan. It also features Neha Sharma, Sharad Kelkar and Luke Kenny in supporting roles. Set in the 17th century, it revolves around Tanaji's attempts to recapture the Kondhana fortress once it passed on to Mughal emperor Aurangzeb who transfers its control to his trusted guard Udaybhan Singh Rathod. It marks as Devgn's 100th film since joining Bollywood 20 years ago.

The film was originally named Taanaji: The Unsung Warrior but the name was later changed to Tanhaji. The film was launched on 20 July 2017, with Raut making his directorial debut in Bollywood. Raut previously directed Lokmanya: Ek Yug Purush (2015), for which he received acclaim. The film was simultaneously dubbed in Marathi following popular demand. Principal photography commenced on 25 September 2018, and completed within May 2019. Filming took in mostly across the Film City in Mumbai, and few scenes shot at Pune. The cinematography and editing were handled by Keiko Nakahara and Dharmendra Sharma. The background score was composed by Sandeep Shirodkar; the soundtrack album was composed by Ajay–Atul, Sachet–Parampara and Mehul Vyas and released under the label T-Series.

Tanhaji was released in India in 3D, 2D and conventional formats on 10 January 2020. The film received wide critical and public praise for Devgn and Khan's performances, the visual effects, cinematography, action sequences, art direction, music, score, and editing. The film grossed ₹387.65 crore (equivalent to ₹498 crore or US$52 million in 2026) worldwide and was declared a major success at the box office, thus becoming the highest grossing Hindi film of 2020 as well as highest grossing Indian film of 2020. The film was selected as one of the Best Foreign Film to be screened at the 78th Golden Globe Awards. At the 68th National Film Awards, the film won the awards for Best Popular Film Providing Wholesome Entertainment, Best Actor (Devgn) and Best Costume Design. At the 66th Filmfare Awards, Tanhaji received 13 nominations, including Best Film and Best Actor (Devgn), and won four awards, including Best Director (Raut) and Best Supporting Actor (Khan).

== Plot ==
In 1647, young Tanhaji Malusare is trained in swordsmanship by his father, Kaloji Malusare, who is later killed during a Mughal raid on their village of Umrat. Seventeen years later, in 1664, Tanhaji, now a military commander in the service of Shivaji Maharaj, leads forces alongside his younger brother Suryaji in defeating a Mughal cavalry detachment.

In 1665, the Mughal Emperor Aurangzeb dispatches his uncle, the Maharaja of Amber Jai Singh I, to check Shivaji’s territorial expansion in the Deccan Plateau. Following the Battle of Purandar, Shivaji is compelled to cede control of 23 forts to the Mughal Empire, including the strategic Kondhana Fort. Subsequently, the Mughal general Beshak Khan insults Shivaji’s mother, Jijabai, who vows to remain barefoot until Kondhana is recaptured.

By 1670, Shivaji’s spies report Aurangzeb’s plan to place Kondhana under the command of Rajput general Udaybhan Rathod, who will use it as a base for Mughal advances in southern India. Udaybhan is transporting a massive cannon, ‘‘Naagin’’, intended to target Maratha positions. Shivaji formulates a plan to retake Kondhana but withholds the details from Tanhaji, whose son Rayba’s wedding is imminent. During the Holi festival, Tanhaji visits Rajgad Fort to invite Shivaji and Jijabai to the wedding. However, Maratha noble Chandraji Pisal, secretly allied with Udaybhan, informs Tanhaji of the planned campaign in an attempt to draw him into a trap. Tanhaji insists on leading the mission, postponing his son’s wedding despite Shivaji’s initial reluctance.

Pisal warns Udaybhan of the Maratha strategy. Using this intelligence, Udaybhan deceives Tanhaji into attacking Maratha soldiers disguised as Mughals. Udaybhan reaches Kondhana unopposed, positions ‘‘Naagin’’ toward Rajgad, and reinforces the fort’s defenses. Tanhaji infiltrates Kondhana through a concealed passage and rallies local villagers to resist Mughal control. During Shivratri celebrations, he kills Pisal’s nephew Chultya for treachery but is captured and tortured by Udaybhan. Jagat Singh, Udaybhan’s subordinate and the brother of captive Kamal Devi, secretly frees Tanhaji and informs him of Udaybhan’s intention to marry Kamal Devi by force. Tanhaji vows to rescue her and reclaim Kondhana.

On the night of 4 February 1670, coinciding with Ashtami, Tanhaji leads a surprise assault on Kondhana. His forces scale the fort’s steep walls and engage the Mughal garrison in fierce combat. Amid the chaos, Jagat Singh and Kamal Devi escape. As Udaybhan prepares to fire ‘‘Naagin’’ at Rajgad, Tanhaji intercepts him. In the ensuing duel, Tanhaji loses an arm but kills Udaybhan, pushing him and the cannon over a cliff. Mortally wounded, Tanhaji plants the Bhagwa Dhwaj on Kondhana before succumbing to his injuries.

When Shivaji arrives, the fort is back under Maratha control. Mourning his fallen commander, Shivaji remarks, “’‘Gad aala, pan sinh gela’’” (“The fort has been captured, but the lion is lost”). Shivaji personally oversees Rayba’s wedding, while Savitribai, Tanhaji’s widow, fulfills her promise to dress as a bride in private as she awaits his return. Aurangzeb’s plan to consolidate Mughal control in southern India is delayed for another eighteen years until he personally campaigns in the Deccan.

== Cast ==
- Ajay Devgn as Subhedar Tanaji Malusare
- Kajol as Savitri Bai
- Saif Ali Khan as Udaybhan Singh Rathore
- Sharad Kelkar as Chatrapati Shivaji Maharaj
- Neha Sharma as Kamla Devi
- Luke Kenny as Emperor Aurangzeb
- Vipul Gupta as Jagat Singh
- Padmavati Rao as Rajmata Jijabai
- Elakshi Gupta as Soyarabai
- Sanjay Mishra as Narrator
- Shashank Shende as Shelaar Mama
- Devdatta Nage as Suryaji Malusare
- Ajinkya Deo as Chandraji Pisal
- Yuri Suri as Jai Singh I
- Jagannath Nivangune as Kaloji Malusare
- Trisha Patil as Parvati Bai
- Hardik Sangani as Gondya
- Nissar Khan as Beshak Khan
- Prasanna Ketkar as Ghersarnaik
- Kailash Waghmare as Chultiya
- Harsh Sharma as Young Tanaji
- Ranav Sharma as Young Suryaji
- Arush Nand as Rayaba Malusare
- Dhairyasheel Gholap as Shrubhau
- Nilesh Lalwani as Tatya
- Pramod More as Leader of Gondia
- Bhagyashree Nhalve as Suryaji's wife
- Devendra Gaikwad as Rayaba's father-in-law
- Rajesh Ahir as Raja Sangram Singh
- Angad Mhaskar as Pant
- Nikhat Khan as Udaybhan's mother
- Antima Sharma as Nafeesa
- Niranjan Jadhao as Trimbak Rao
- Shivraj Walvekar as Pratap Rao
- Rajveer Ankur Singh as Khaibar Khan
- Ramchandran Singh as Raja Kaka
- Myrah Dandekar as Rayaba's wife
- Tufali Khan as Munawar Khan
- Mridul Kumar as Noor Khan Baig
- Sandeep Juwatkar as Gujar
- Ajay Kumar Nain as Rajput Vakil
- Rakesh Bhavsar as peshwa
- Nitesh Kalbande as Divya Malusare
- Tareeq Ahmed Khan as Mughal Soldier

== Production ==
=== Development ===
After completing his work on the directorial venture Shivaay (2016), Ajay Devgn, announced his next film on 29 July 2016, titled Sons of Sardaar: Battle of Saragarhi, a big-budget war film based on the 1897 Saragarhi battle between 21 Sikhs and 10,000 Afghans. Made on a huge scale, Devgn planned to start the production work in late 2016, and decided to release the film on Diwali next year; However, when Karan Johar announced Kesari, another film based on the battle of Saragarhi, Devgn decided to postpone the project after September 2017. In late February 2019, it was reported that Devgn had shelved the project.

Meanwhile, Ajay Devgn, decided to do another period film with Om Raut, based on the life of Maratha warrior Tanaji Malusare, which was titled officially as Taanaji: The Unsung Warrior. The first look of Taanaji was released on 20 July 2017, through Devgn's official Twitter account, and pre-production work commenced the following day. In August 2017, a report from Asian Age, claimed that the film will also be made simultaneously in Marathi language, due to the demand of the story, and also Raut's popularity in Marathi, after the success of Lokmanya: Ek Yug Purush (2015).

A source claimed that the film's pre-production work would go on for 6–8 months, and Ajay Devgn would start the shoot of the film in March 2018. However, the team undertook heavy VFX works for the film for 6–8 months, and Devgn's NY VFXWAALA was brought on board for the film, whereas filmmakers planned to release the film in 3D formats, thus delaying the film's shoot to September 2018. On 2 August 2018, Bhushan Kumar of T-Series, undertook the project in collaboration with Ajay Devgn's production company and planned to start the shoot in end of September. In March 2019, the film's title Taanaji: The Unsung Warrior was changed to Tanhaji, due to numerological reasons.

=== Casting ===
In October 2018, Kajol was reported to play the role of Taanaji's wife in the film. In January 2019, Saif Ali Khan was reported to play the role of Udaybhan Singh Rathore, one of the main antagonists of the film. For his role, Khan had to practise sword fighting and horse-riding, as part of the character. In an interview with Mid-Day, he stated "A chunk of the research has been done by Om, who has done a thorough job. Since it is an action-packed film, I was required to look leaner. I had to be adept in horse riding. The fact that I was coming straight off Navdeep's [Singh] film (Laal Kaptaan) made it easier. The physical prep has been rigorous for this film."

=== Filming ===
Principal photography began on 25 September 2018, with a muhurat shot given by Om Raut. The film's first schedule was commenced in October 2018, with Kajol filming her portions in Mumbai.

Tanhaji was filmed mainly at the Film City in Mumbai. Director Om Raut claimed that in the movie, visual effects played a major part. The director also said that making the Sandhan Valley set was the biggest challenge for them. The makers had to create a 300-foot (91 m) long set to make it look like the Sandhan Valley. In the making video of the film, Raut stated: "Creating the 300-foot (91 m) long gorge inside a theatre was extremely difficult," adding that the production designers "went and took moulds of the stones and rocks which are there in the valley and they built a wall. And what we did in the effects after that is we put in effects on it."

The team of the film also shot some parts at Chitrakoot Ground in Andheri. Some parts of the film were also filmed at Pune. In January 2019, the team kicked off a song shoot which has been mounted on a lavish scale and that a special set was erected for this number. Kajol, however, shot for this number last year, in the last week of December. As the song was so elaborate that the shooting schedule for the same was as long as a week and the number will feature some amazing diya and rangoli setup representing that era. Keeping in the mind the period that the film is set up in, Kajol sported wearing a traditional Maharashtrian outfit in the song.

In March 2019, a source claimed that 60% of the shoot was completed, and the team took a break, after Devgn being busy for the promotions of his film Total Dhamaal (2019). In April 2019, a climax shoot featuring Devgn and Khan was filmed in a huge scale, and the stunt sequence was choreographed by Ramazan Bulut, who worked in the stunt department for Hollywood films Rush (2013) and Inferno (2016). The principal photography wrapped up in May 2019.

== Soundtrack ==
Tanhaji

Soundtrack album by Ajay–Atul, Sachet–Parampara Mehul Vyas and Prasenjit Kosambi
- Released: 8 January 2020
- Recorded: 2018–2019
- Genre: Filmi
- Length: 17:27
- Language: Hindi
- Label: T-Series
External audio
- Official Audio Jukebox on YouTube

The film's soundtrack album was composed by Ajay–Atul, Sachet–Parampara Mehul Vyas and Prasenjit Kosambi with lyrics written by Swanand Kirkire Anil Verma and Abhijit Kosambi. The background score of the film is composed by Sandeep Shirodkar. The album features four tracks with vocals by Mehul Vyas, Adarsh Shinde, Sukhwinder Singh, Shreya Ghoshal, Sachet Tandon, Parampara Thakur, Ganesh Chandanshive, Harshdeep Kaur and Prasenjit Kosambi. It was released on 20 December 2019 by T-Series. The soundtrack album for the Marathi version had reused the same set of vocals, excluding for some songs, whose vocals were provided by Avadhoot Gupte and Kirti Killedar.

Debarati Sen of The Times of India, writing for the soundtrack album in her review, praised "Maay Bhavani" stating "Ajay-Atul has excelled in the beautiful merging of different tempos, and deftly woven in the varied nuances of classical and folk in one single package." Vipin Nair, in his review for The Hindu, stated "With three hummable numbers, the film's music is enjoyable but nothing out of the ordinary." Joginder Tuteja of Bollywood Hungama reviewed "The soundtrack of Tanhaji – The Unsung Warrior delivers as expected. Though there aren't many memorable songs out there, they do well enough to keep the film's narrative engaging."

Track listing
No.	Title	Lyrics	Music	Singer(s)	Length
1.	"Shankara Re Shankara"	Anil Verma	Mehul Vyas	Mehul Vyas	3:31
2.	"Maay Bhavani"	Swanand Kirkire	Ajay–Atul	Sukhwinder Singh, Shreya Ghoshal, Ajay Gogavale	4:18
3.	"Ghamand Kar"	Anil Verma	Sachet–Parampara	Sachet Tandon, Parampara Thakur	4:42
4.	"Tinak Tinak"	Anil Verma	Sachet–Parampara	Harshdeep Kaur	3:54
5.	"Asa Mard Maratha Tanhaji"	Abhijit Kosambi	Prasenjit Kosambi	Prasenjit Kosambi	1:02
Total length:					17:27

== Marketing and release ==
Tanhaji, considered to be one of the most anticipated Hindi films of the year, was initially scheduled to release on 29 November 2019, post-Diwali, but the release was postponed to the necessity of VFX works in a large scale needed for the film. On 28 March 2019, the makers rescheduled the release date to 10 January 2020.

Prior to the release of the film, the Sambhaji Brigade faced objection of some scenes from the trailer which released in November 2019. In a letter written to the crew members, dated 20 November 2019, the organization had alleged that the film has intentionally tried to erase Shivaji Maharaj's secular image. They had also taken objection to the dialogues of Kajol who plays the role of Savitribai Malusare. The organization had also demanded a special screening of the film ahead of its release. Later, Nationalist Congress Party leader Jitendra Ahwad, threatened the makers of the film to make several changes to the trailer of the film, also accused filmmaker Om Raut of depicting history inaccurately and unethically and showing the Maratha warrior Tanaji Malusare in a wrong way. The Akhil Bhartiya Kshatriya Koli Rajput Sangh had filed a petition in Delhi High Court on 13 December 2019, claiming that its director Om Raut has concealed the true lineage of the great warrior Tanaji Malusare in the movie. In January 2020, the Central Board of Film Certification deleted controversial references in the film, and ensured multiple disclaimers in the beginning to avoid controversies.

Tanhaji opened up to 4,540 screens worldwide, which included 3,880 screens in 3D and conventional formats in Hindi and Marathi versions and 660 screens overseas. A day before its release, the makers premiered a special screening of the film on 9 January, featuring Devgn and his family, along with the cast and crew. Later on 13 January, Devgn hosted special screening of the film, for 600 school children at the Inox Megaplex in Mumbai, to know about the history of Tanaji Malusare. Another special screening was held on 20 January for the army and navy officials. The Maharashtra Tourism Development Corporation had tied up an association with the Directorate of Tourism and the film's team to attract tourists to know about the history of Tanaji Malusare and its legacy. The film was declared tax-free in Uttar Pradesh, Haryana and Maharashtra. This film was also released dubbed in Marathi-language following popular demand.

Tanhaji's world television premiere took place on 26 July 2020 at Star Plus, and registered 1.2 crore impressions on its first airing. The film released on Disney+ Hotstar on 6 March 2020.

== Reception ==
=== Critical response ===
On the review aggregator website Rotten Tomatoes, 75% of 12 critics' reviews are positive, with an average rating of 6/10.

A review over the Hindustan Times noted it to be a magnificent work, which had exceptional individual performances, a captivating story-line and excellent virtual effects. Namrata Joshi of The Hindu noted of the film to have started off well, before floundering in the middle but regaining brilliance at the end, delivering a catharsis and adrenaline rush. Uday Bhatia of The Mint noted it to be a silly cartoon history, which borrowed its physics from Prince of Persia, but nonetheless consisted of fluent actions and interesting individual performances. Saibal Chatterjee of NDTV noted it to be a historically inauthentic work that ironed out any and all nuances in its portrayal of a saffronized Hindu-Muslim binary; however, he noted the overall production to be crisp and backed by powerful individual performances. Tanul Thakur of The Wire noted it to be a work that had excellent cinematography but was intensely buoyed down by its ahistorical religio-nationalist propaganda, catering to the overall saffronization of India.

Shubhra Gupta over The Indian Express noted it to offer a "simplistic, dressed-up slice of the past" that painted hyperbolic tales of Maratha bravery with a Hindu fervor. Sukanya Verma of Rediff noted it to be a mythical retelling of history with a bout of saffron fervor; individual performances and choreography of combat sequences were praised. Rajeev Masand noted it to be a dubiously stereotyped fictional work, which appealed to the hyper-nationalistic climate but had robust filmography, visceral battle scenes, and superb individual performances. A critic from The Economic Times praised the visual effects, computer graphics and editing of the film, making it a must-watch film. Stutee Ghosh of The Quint noted it to be a visually stunning film with strong individual performances, despite its broad liberties with historical accuracy and problematic prejudices. Jyoti Kanyal of India Today gave two-and-a-half out of five stars stating "Tanhaji: The Unsung Warrior is an exaggerated and slow-paced ode to the great Maratha warrior Tanaji Malusare."

Writing for the Firstpost, Devanesh Sharma gave two-and-a-half out of five stars and praised Kajol and Khan's performance while criticizing Devgn's characterization as the review stated "The leading man, though undoubtedly an unsung warrior, as the title suggests, comes across as rather one-dimensional, as Devgn fails to take his character beyond the written word." Harshada Rege of The Times of India gave four out of five stars and stated "Tanhaji: The Unsung Warrior scores on various counts – superior performances, powerful action, visual impact, and most of all, it unfolds a story from the pages of history that deserved to be told, with just this kind of intensity, passion and vigor." Sify gave the film 3 out of 5 stars stating "Tanhaji is substantially enriched by its technical crew that has worked to create a splendid canvas for the cast to shine upon. It tells the story of a lesser known hero from the chapters of Indian history, which makes this an intriguing film."

Monika Rawal Kukreja of Hindustan Times wrote in her review stating "Tanhaji is a complete package. It’s magnificent, high on visual effects and has powerful action backed by rock solid performances." Rohit Vats of News18 gave three-and-a-half out of five stars stating "Devgn and Khan ensure that the viewers get enough dose of high-voltage dialogues, along with fascinating action scenes." Nandini Ramnath of Scroll stated "Tanhaji loudly sings its hero’s praises, creating a spectacle that is thrilling when in battle mode and troubling when considering the dynamic between the Marathas and the Mughals."

Avinash Ramachandran of The New Indian Express gave three out of five stars stating "In Tanhaji: The Unsung Warrior, we get to see iconic warriors of India shed tears copiously. We get to see jingoism masked as Maratha valor. There are a lot of things going for Tanhaji, but, deep inside, it is unsettling to see such polarizing historical dramas." A critic from Bollywood Hungama rated four out of five stars and stated Tanhaji is an entertaining and a paisa-vasool film that would be loved by the masses as well as classes. Suparna Sharma of Deccan Chronicle gave three out of five stars stating "Tanhaji: The Unsung Warrior, whose plot is essentially a march towards the battle, is not a bad film. It is, in fact, quite entertaining when it is at war." A critic from Daily News and Analysis gave three out of five stars stating "Watch it for the magnificent performances by Kajol and Khan who clearly outshine this Devgn-led vehicle."

=== Box office ===
Tanhaji earned ₹15.10 crore (US$2.04 million) at the domestic box office on its opening day. On the second day, the film collected ₹20.57 crore (US$2.78 million). On the third day, the film collected ₹26.26 crore (US$3.54 million), taking total opening weekend collection to ₹619.3 million ₹61.93 crore (US$8.36 million). On the fourth day (13 January), the film collected ₹13.75 crore (US$1.86 million), and film's collection stood at ₹75.63 crore (US$10.21 million). On the fifth day (14 January), the collection stood much higher after the long holiday weekend owing to Makar Sankranti and the film collected ₹15.28 crore (US$2.06 million), totalling the first five-day collection to ₹90.96 crore (US$12.28 million). On 15 January, the film hit the ₹100-crore mark, as the six-day collections stood up to ₹107.68 crore (US$14.53 million). At the end of the first week (16 January), the film collected ₹118.91 crore (US$16.05 million). The film collected ₹128.97 crore (US$17.4 million), on the eighth day of its release, with a strong opening on the second Friday.

The film crossed the ₹150 crore mark on the tenth day of its release. On 25 January, the film crossed the ₹200 crore mark, as the overall collection stood up to ₹202.83 crore (US$27.37 million). On 3 February, the film collected ₹250 crore (US$33.74 million) at the box office. At the end of its seventh week, the film collected ₹276.90 crore (US$37.37 million). The film managed to earn ₹279.60 crore (US$37.73 million), at the domestic box office, within 50 days of its release. As of 13 March 2020, with theatres closure due to the COVID-19 pandemic, the film had accumulated ₹332.8 crore (US$44.91 million), in India and ₹34.85 crore (US$4.7 million) overseas, thus collecting ₹367.65 crore (US$49.62 million) worldwide, it became the highest-grossing Bollywood film of 2020.

== Historical accuracy ==
In the final fight against Udaybhan Rathod,Tanhaji lost his shield,not his arm. Tanhaji's brother Suryaji Malusare also fought bravely. Tanhaji never threw a stick at Chhatrapati Shivaji Maharaj as depicted in this film. In 17th century Maratha warriors used shields made up of the back of tortoise, they did not use shields made up of metals as shown in this movie.In one scene a barber helps Udaybhan but this incident has no historical truth.Tanhaji was never captured and held captive by Udaybhan Rathod as depicted in this film.Moreover, contemporary sources reveal that Tanhaji was killed by Udaybhan and consequently Udaybhan was killed by Shelar Mama, and not by Tanhaji as depicted in the movie.

== Accolades ==
Award (Note: Awards, festivals and organizations are in alphabetical order.)	Date of ceremony (Note: Date is linked to the article about the awards held that year, wherever possible.)	Category	Recipient(s)	Result	Ref.
Filmfare Awards	27 March 2021	Best Film	Ajay Devgn FFilms, T-Series	Nominated	
Filmfare Awards	27 March 2021	Best Director	Om Raut	Won	
Filmfare Awards	27 March 2021	Best Actor	Ajay Devgn. Nominated		
Filmfare Awards	27 March 2021	Best Supporting Actor	Saif Ali Khan	Won	
Filmfare Awards	27 March 2021	Best Screenplay	Prakash Kapadia, Om Raut	Nominated	
Filmfare Awards	27 March 2021	Best Dialogue	Prakash Kapadia	Nominated	
Filmfare Awards	27 March 2021	Best Cinematography	Keiko Nakahara	Nominated	
Filmfare Awards	27 March 2021	Best Production Design	Sriram Kannan Iyengar, Sujeet Sawant	Nominated	
Filmfare Awards	27 March 2021	Best Costume Design	Nachiket Barve, Mahesh Sheria	Nominated	
Filmfare Awards	27 March 2021	Best Action	Ramazan Bulut, Rp Yadav	Won	
Filmfare Awards	27 March 2021	Best Choreography	Ganesh Acharya – ("Shankara Re Shankara")	Nominated	
Filmfare Awards	27 March 2021	Best Special Effects	Prasad Sutar	Won	
Filmfare Awards	27 March 2021	Best Background Score	Sandeep Shirodkar	Nominated	
IIFA Awards	4 June 2022	Best Film	Ajay Devgn FFilms, T-Series	Nominated	
IIFA Awards	4 June 2022	Best Supporting Actor	Saif Ali Khan	Nominated	
IIFA Awards	4 June 2022	Best Sound Design	Lochan Kanvinde	Won	
National Film Awards	22 July 2022	Best Popular Film Providing Wholesome Entertainment	Ajay Devgn FFilms	Won	
National Film Awards	22 July 2022	Best Actor	Ajay Devgn (Note: shared with Suriya for Soorarai Pottru (2020).)	Won	
National Film Awards	22 July 2022	Best Costume Design	Nachiket Barve & Mahesh Sherla	Won	

=== Legacy and social impact ===
Tanhaji became the highest-rated film of the year. A report from Google Trends stated that the film is the third most searched film on Google. The film was selected as one of the Best Foreign Film to be screened at the 78th Golden Globe Awards in January 2021.
