= Pan Lakshat Kon Gheto =

1890 novel by Hari Narayan Apte

- Cover of English translation
- Author: Hari Narayan Apte
- Original title: पण लक्षात कोण घेतो?
- Translator: Santosh Bhoomkar
- Language: Marathi
- Genre: Social novel, autobiographical novel
- Publication date: 1890
- Publication place: India
- English publication date: 2015
- OCLC: 922565313

Pan Lakshat Kon Gheto (Marathi: पण लक्षात कोण घेतो?, English: But Who Cares...) is an 1890 Marathi-language novel by Hari Narayan Apte. Written in autobiographical style, the novel tells the story of Yamuna, a young Hindu middle-class woman, who dies after suffering the injustices of a society where child marriage is customary. It is considered to be a classic novel in Marathi literature.

== Background ==
Pan Lakshat Kon Gheto was first published in 1890. Prior to this work, novels were written and read for "entertainment and instruction." Pan Lakshat Kon Gheto, which unveiled the lives of child widows, was a significant departure from this methodology.

== Plot ==
The novel was written in the form of an autobiography from the perspective of a young widow, Yamuna. The story spans the life of Yamuna and the reader is introduced to the many people in her life—nearly 40 characters.

Yamuna's story begins with a short-lived but idyllic childhood. Although happy, it was darkened by the fear Yamuna's mother and grandmother shared over their insecurity as dependents. At twelve she is married to a young man, Raghunathrao. He is liberal and wants to make Yamuna but he is unable to change her family circumstances. Yamuna is tortured by her in-laws and denied freedom of any kind.

When Yamuna's mother dies, her father promptly remarries, this time to a twelve-year-old girl. Her brother's stupid wife makes a hell of Yamuna's married life and although Yamuna and her brother, Ganpatrao, are very affectionate towards each other, there is no happiness in their father's house. Yamuna and her husband move to Bombay where they both find some happiness. In Bombay she meets some reformist families who show her what it's like to have freedom. While there, Yamuna frees her friend Durga from her depraved husband and her brother comes to stay with her to continue his education.

Yamuna's husband dies after a brief illness and her happiness and freedom are suddenly over. Yamuna is forced to return to her father-in-law in Shanker, who has now married a young girl of twelve. Yamuna's in-laws rob her of her gold and forcefully shave her head in the name of sacred custom (tonsure). Her brother cannot do anything to protect her. She dies some time after having written her life story.

== Reception ==
The novel is considered to be a classic, sometimes referred to as a feminist classic, in Marathi literature and had a major effect on Hindu reform movements.

Pan Lakshat Kon Gheto? This novel is the first of its kind and still remains unsurpassed in many ways. It is cast in the form of the autobiography of a widow. It is written in a style which is appropriately womanly, and chaste, if also meandering. For the first time in Marathi fiction a character is portrayed dynamically and in all its dimensions.

— Kusumawati Deshpande, M.V. Rajadhyaksha, A History of Marathi Literature, 1988

Pan Lakshat Kon Gheto was translated into English by Santosh Bhoomkar as But Who Cares... (2015), published by Sahitya Akademi. P. V. Narasimha Rao translated it into Telugu as Abala Jeevitam. Leela Karanth also translated the novel into Kannada. The Gujarati translation by Gopalrao Vidwans was published in 1975 under the title Mari Karamkathani.
