= Nilendra Ganesh Deshpande =

American theoretical physicist and academic

Nilendra Deshpande Professor Emeritus
- Born: 1938 (age 87–88); Karachi, Pakistan
- Other name: "Desh"
- Citizenship: American
- Children: Two sons

Academic background
- Education: Presidency College; University of Pennsylvania

Academic work
- Discipline: Physics
- Institutions: Northwestern University; University of Texas at Austin; University of Oregon
- Main interests: High energy particle physics theory

Nilendra Ganesh Deshpande (born 1938) is an American theoretical high-energy physicist and professor emeritus at the University of Oregon. His interests include theories of electroweak interactions, grand unification, and neutrino physics.

== Early life and education ==
Deshpande was born in 1938 in Karachi, Pakistan. He studied at Presidency College in Madras, India, from 1954 to 1960. In 1960 he married Kanchanmala Karnik. They moved to the United States in 1962, and they had two sons.

Deshpande earned a Ph.D. in 1965 at the University of Pennsylvania, with his dissertation, Compositeness Conditions and Broken Symmetry in a Model Field Theory, advised by Sidney A. Bludman.

== Career ==
Deshpande was on the faculty at Northwestern University from 1967 to 1973, and the University of Texas at Austin from 1973 to 1975. He joined the faculty at the University of Oregon in 1975, where is research has included weak interaction phenomenology, including models beyond the Standard Model, the Higgs boson, as well as CP violation and phenomenology of the B Meson.

At Oregon, Deshpande has served as physics department head and also has served as associate dean for the Sciences.

== Selected publications ==
- Nilendra G. Deshpande, Ernest Ma. "Pattern of Symmetry Breaking with Two Higgs Doublets." DOI: 10.1103/PhysRevD.18.2574, Phys.Rev.D 18 (1978), 2574.
- Abdelhak Djouadi (ed.) et al. "International Linear Collider Reference Design Report Volume 2: Physics at the ILC", ILC Collaboration (Sep, 2007) e-Print: 0709.1893.
- N.G. Deshpande, P. Lo, J. Trampetic, G. Eilam, P. Singer.. "B ---> K* gamma and the Top Quark Mass" (Jan 20, 1987) Phys.Rev.Lett. 59 (1987) 183-185
- N.G. Deshpande, J.F. Gunion, Boris Kayser, Fredrick I. Olness. "Left-right symmetric electroweak models with triplet Higgs" (May, 1990) Phys.Rev.D 44 (1991) 837–858.

== Awards, honors ==
- 1981-1986: Outstanding Junior Investigator, United States Department of Energy.
- 1987: Fellow of the American Physical Society, cited "For numerous contributions to electro-weak phenomenology, especially CP violation, one loop flavor changing processes and properties and mass limits of new gauge bosons from grand unification."

== See also ==
- Theoretical physics
