= Anil Deshpande =

Indian former first-class cricketer

Personal information
- Full name: Anil Prabhakar Deshpande
- Born: 2 August 1952 (age 74); Nagpur, Maharashtra, India
- Role: All-rounder

Domestic team information
- Years: Team
- 1970/71–1982/83: Vidarbha

Career statistics
| Competition | FC | List A |
|---|---|---|
| Matches | 62 | 6 |
| Runs scored | 3,157 | 116 |
| Batting average | 32.21 | 23.20 |
| 100s/50s | 4/19 | 0/0 |
| Top score | 164* | 48 |
| Balls bowled | 5,227 | 48 |
| Wickets | 88 | 1 |
| Bowling average | 29.67 | 49.00 |
| 5 wickets in innings | 1 | 0 |
| 10 wickets in match | 0 | n/a |
| Best bowling | 6/45 | 1/7 |
| Catches/stumpings | 32/– | 1/0 |
- Source: ESPNcricinfo, 6 February 2016

Anil Deshpande (born 2 August 1952) is an Indian former first-class cricketer who played for Vidarbha. He worked as a selector for the Indian team from 1998 to 2000.

== Career ==
Deshpande played as an all-rounder for Vidarbha across 13 seasons. He made 62 first-class appearances, scoring more than 3000 runs and taking 88 wickets. He was a regular member of Central Zone cricket team during his career and made 21 first-class appearances for the team. Although he did not play international matches, Deshpande represented Central Zone against visiting Australian, English, Pakistani, Sri Lankan and West Indies teams in first-class matches.

In 1998, Deshpande became a member of the Indian team selection panel, representing Central Zone. He resigned from the position in 2000, citing personal reasons. Later in his career, he also stood as an umpire in cricket matches.
