= C. D. Deshpande =

Indian geographer, author and educator

Chandrashekhar Dhundiraj Deshpande
- Born: 14 January 1912; Kolhapur, Kolhapur State
- Died: 14 November 1999 (aged 87); Pune, Maharashtra
- Other names: C. D. Deshpande; Dada; Bhai
- Education: University of Mumbai; University of California
- Occupations: author, geographer, educationist, teacher

Chandrashekhar Dhundiraj Deshpande (14 January 1912 – 14 November 1999) was an Indian geographer, educationist and author

== Life ==
Deshpande was born in a Marathi-speaking Deshastha Rigvedi Brahmin family of Sanskrit scholars on 14 January 1912 in Kolhapur, a city then in Kolhapur State. He studied economics, politics, and history as his basic subjects for his degree in the University of Mumbai. Subsequently, he did a diploma in geography from the University of California.

An academic innovator and teacher he worked on many fronts to improve the status of Geography as an independent science and discipline in India. For this purpose, he gathered ideas from the principal centres of geographical teaching and research in the United Kingdom. His work in the field of Geography may be divided into three spheres – schools, universities, and geographical societies. Deshpande made vigorous efforts for the teaching of geography in schools and colleges in Maharashtra. He laid particular stress on the nature of the subject. Deshpande's own personal efforts were also crucial in the establishment of an independent department of geography at the University of Bombay. He raised the question of founding an All-India geographical Organization, and efforts in that direction led to the establishment of the National Association of Geographers, India.

== Works ==
- Urbanisation, Development, and Environment: C.D. Deshpande Memorial Volume. Rawat Publications. 2007. ISBN 978-8131600566.
- India : A Regional Interpretation. South Asia Books. 1992. ISBN 978-8172110185.
- Impact of a metropolitan city on the surrounding region : a study of South Kolaba, Maharashtra. Concept Publishing Company. 1980.
- Geography of Maharashtra. National Book Trust, India. 1971.
- Strategy for integrated area development : case study of North Kanara District, Karnataka. Concept Publishing Company. 1988. ISBN 978-8170221982.
- Western India; a regional geography. Students' Own Book Depot. 1948.
- A Survey of research in physical geography. Concept Publishing Company. 1983.
- Śahare : bhaugolika abhyāsa. Mahārāshṭra Vidyāpīṭha Grantha Nirmitī Maṇḍaḷāsāṭhī Kôṇṭineṇṭala Prakāśana. 1980.
- Zapadnai︠a︡ Indii︠a︡ : geograficheskiĭ obzor. Izd-vo inostrannoĭ lit-ry. 1956.

== Honours ==
- D.Litt., 1958: University of Mumbai, Mumbai, India
