= Madhav Kashinath Deshpande =

Indian Marathi writer

- Born: 1910; British India
- Died: 1974 (aged 63–64)
- Writing career
- Language: English
- Notable works: Aadhar, Priya Kavite, Dhoomra Taranga

Madhav Kashinath Deshpande (1910–1974) was a Marathi writer from Maharashtra, India and a renowned professor of English language and literature of his times. He was unique for his facility both in English and Marathi, making studious efforts to apply his experience of English literature to creative and critical writing in Marathi.

His writings include:

- A novel Aadhar (अंधार) (1953)
- A collection of his poems Priya Kavite (प्रिय कविते) (1972)
- Personal essays compiled in Dhoomra Taranga (धूम्रतरंग) (1939)
- Literary critiques compiled in Sahitya Sadhana (साहित्य साधना)
- Critiques of the works of Pralhad Keshav Atre, Narayan Sitaram Phadke, Narasimha Chintaman Kelkar, and Vishnu Sakharam Khandekar
- A Marathi-English Dictionary (1967)
- Sant Aani Science (Marathi saint poets and science) (1970, reprinted 2010)
