= Arun Deshpande =

Arun Deshpande is a coach of the Indian Carrom team. He is from Thane, in Maharashtra. He has also coached the Maharashtra Carrom team.

== As Player ==
As a player, he was a seven time state champion (a record since 1976) and a national champion. He is an Indian National champion in Singles, Doubles, Mixed doubles and veteran singles.

== As Coach ==
He coached the Indian national Carrom team on 44 occasions, including the 1st and 3rd World Carrom Championship. He has written 3 books on Carrom: Two for players and the other for coaches. He has produced two CDs namely, Carrom Technique and Carrom Treasure. These contain huge knowledge, tips, tricks, and techniques on Carrom.

He also coached Pierre Dubois, the winner of Euro Open Carrom Tournament.

In 2006, the first Carrom Dron was presented to Arun Deshpande, when India won the Carrom World Cup.

He has coached players from India, Sri Lanka, Maldives, Switzerland, Germany, Italy, France, UK, Spain. USA and Canada.

== As a Writer ==
He has written three books namely "Carrom Skill and Technique", "Players Guide" and "Coaches Guide".

He has produced four DVDs/VCDs "Carrom Technique", "Carrom Treasure"., "Amazing Strokes" and "Stress Release"

He has produced 4 vcds 1)Carrom Technique 2)Carrom Treasure 3) Amazing Strokes 4) Exhibition strokes for stress relief He has Facebook page namely Arun Carrom He has YouTube channel namely Arun Deshpande

He has developed a website carromcoaching.com There are three levels of courses 1) Beginners - 12 videos 2) Intermediate - 25 videos 3) Champion - 32 videos
