= Tanaji Malusare =

Army leader in Shivaji's Army (?-1670)

Tanaji Kaloji Malusare
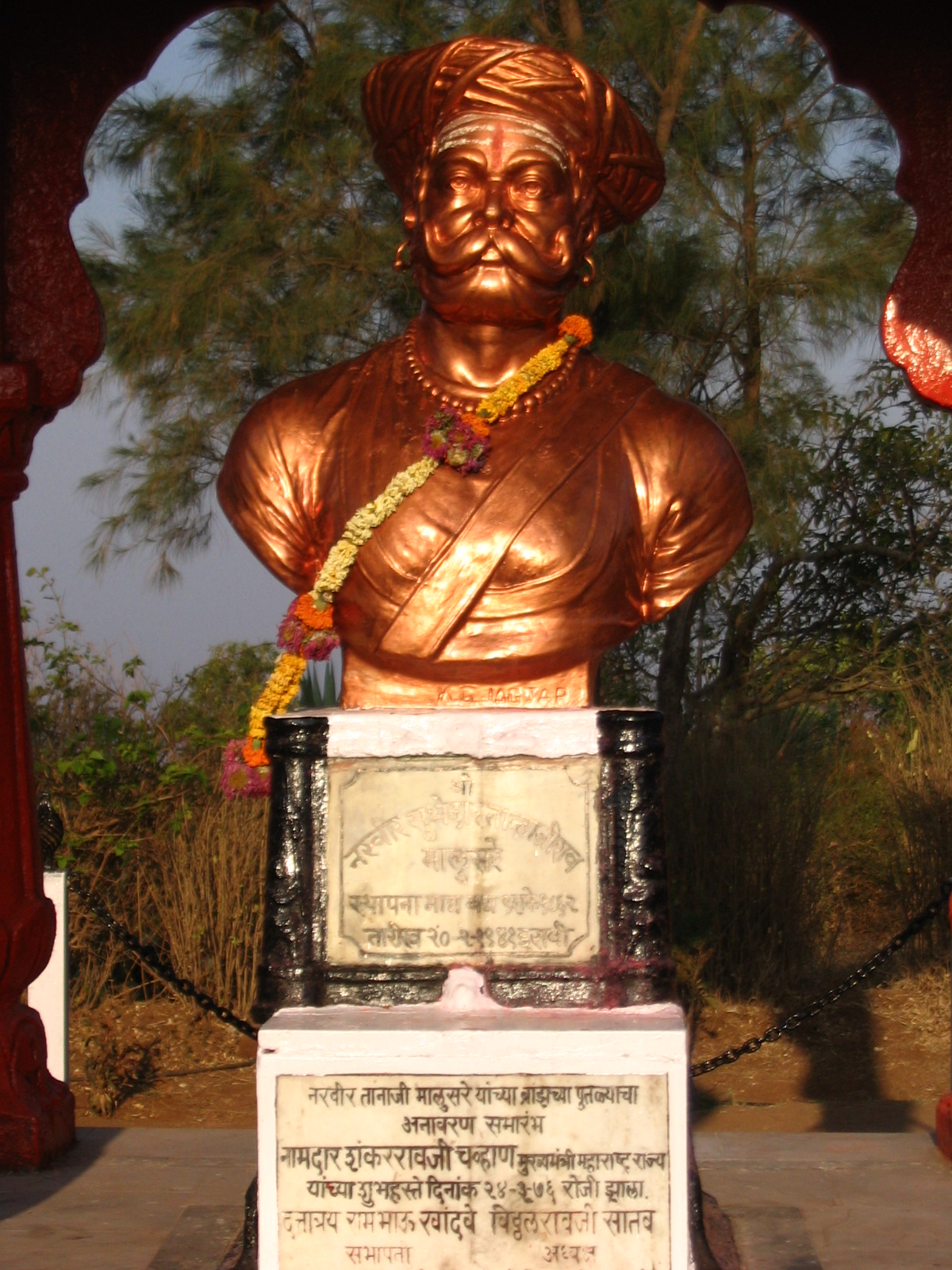
- Bronze bust of Subhedar Tanaji Malusare at Sinhagad
- Born: Godavli, Mahabaleshwar taluka, Satara, Maharashtra
- Died: 4 February 1670; Sinhagad, Maharashtra, India
- Relatives: Kaloji Malusare (father); Savitri Bai (wife); Raybaji Malusare (son)
- Military career
- Allegiance: Maratha Empire
- Branch: Maratha Army
- Service years: c. 1646–1670
- Rank: Subedar
- Known for: Battle of Sinhagad
- Conflicts: Capture of Torna fort Battle of Pratapgarh; Battle of Jawali; Battle of Sinhagad †

Tanaji Kaloji Malusare or Subedar Tanaji Malusare was a military commander of the Maratha kingdom and a companion of Shivaji Maharaj.

local poet Tulsidas, (Note: not to be confused with Goswami Tulsidas) wrote a powada describing Subhedar Tanaji's heroics and sacrifice of life in the Battle of Sinhagad, which has since made him a popular figure in Indian folklore. (Note: The text has not been dated conclusively. It is popularly accepted to be written not long after the Battle; however, some scholars have claimed the text to have been written in the eighteenth century.)

== Background ==
According to the historian David Hardiman, Kolis were the early helpers of Shivaji in a revolt. Tanaji Malusare is one such prominent example whose name is memorizalized due to his act of capturing the fort of Singhad and handing it to Shivaji. Tanaji's father's name was Kaloji Malusare.

== In popular culture ==
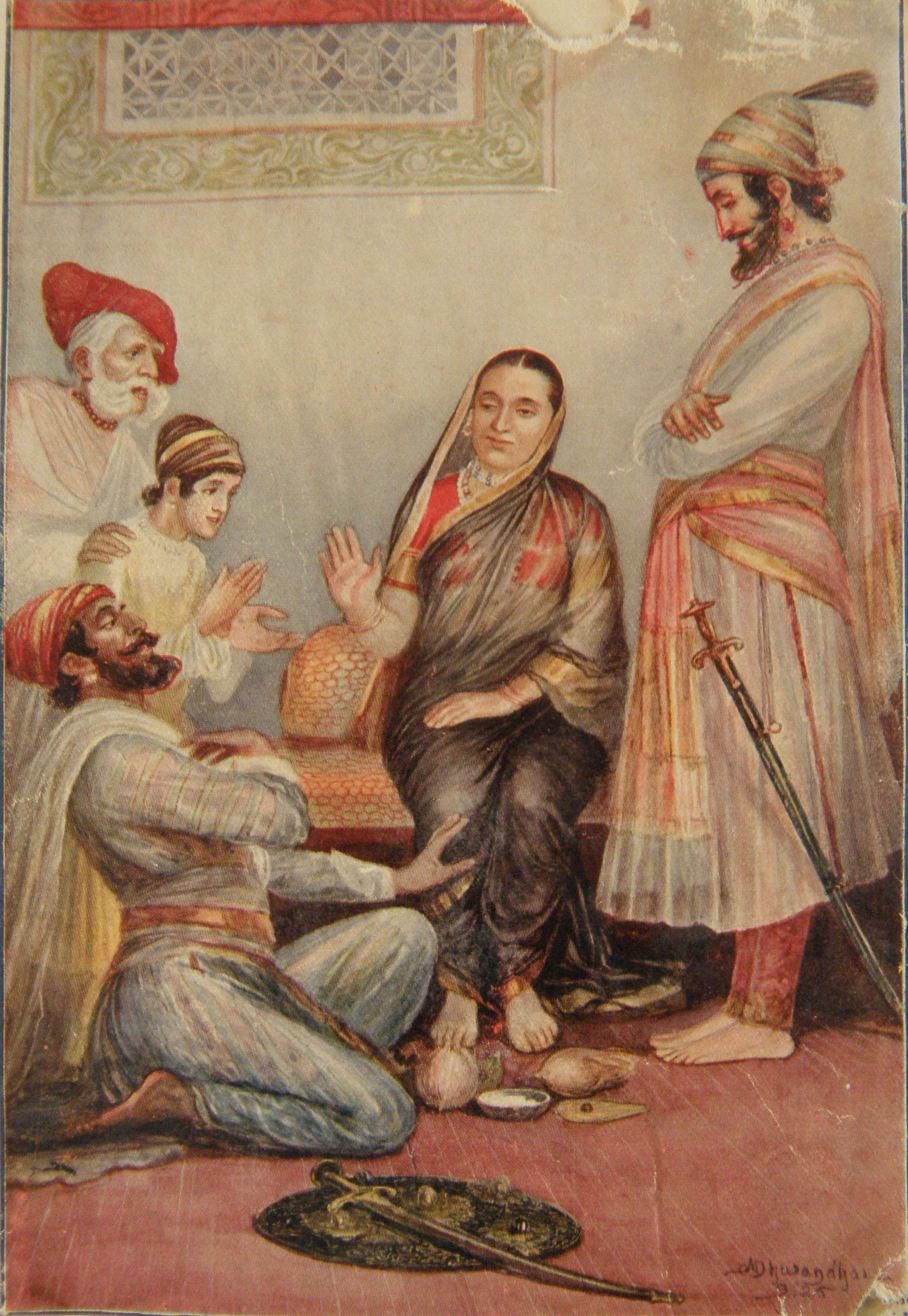
An early 20th century depiction by M.V. Dhurandhar of Tanaji's vow to Shivaji and Jijabai in the presence of his son and uncle before the campaign for Kondana fort.

- Vinayak Damodar Savarkar had written a ballad on him, which was banned by the colonial British government.
- Gad aala pan sinh gela (Marathi: गड आला पण सिंह गेला) (transl. We won the fort but we lost the lion) a Marathi novel by Hari Narayan Apte was written in 1903, based on his life.
- In 1922 Bengali poet Jatindramohan Bagchi wrote a poem named Singhagarh stating the heroic death of Tanaji Malusare while recapturing the fort.
- Sinhagad (1923 film)
- Sinhagad, a 1933 Marathi film was produced by Baburao Painter, based on the 1903 novel.
- Bengali writer Saradindu Bandyopadhyay wrote the Sadashib series where the younger version of Tanaji was mentioned as a close associate of Shivaji.
- In 1971 Amar Chitra Katha released a comic book called Tanaji, written by Meena Talim and illustrated by Vasant B. Halbe.
- Tanaji's character is portrayed by an actor in Raja Shivchhatrapati serial of Star Pravah.
- In the 2011-2012 Indian historical TV serial Veer Shivaji, he is portrayed by Devdatta Nage.
- In the 2018 Marathi-language epic Farzand, Tanaji Malusare is portrayed by Ganesh Yadav.
- In the 2019 Marathi-language epic Fatteshikast, Tanaji Malusare is portrayed by Ajay Purkar.
- Bollywood actor Ajay Devgn produced and played the role of Tanaji Malusare in Tanhaji. It was based on the Battle of Kondhana, Tanhaji film theatrically released on 10 January 2020. It was a box-office hit.
- In the 2022 Marathi-language film Sher Shivraj, Tanaji Malusare is portrayed by Ajay Purkar.
- In the 2023 Marathi-language epic Subhedar, Tanaji Malusare is portrayed by Ajay Purkar.
- In the 2026 Marathi-language film, Raja Shivaji, Tanaji Malusare is portrayed by Mayur More in childhood, and Rahul Mahajan in adulthood.

== See also ==
- Baji Prabhu Deshpande
- Murarbaji
- Bahirji Naik
- Suryaji Malusare
