= Khed Shivapur =

Village in Maharashtra

Khed Shivapur Shivapur
- village
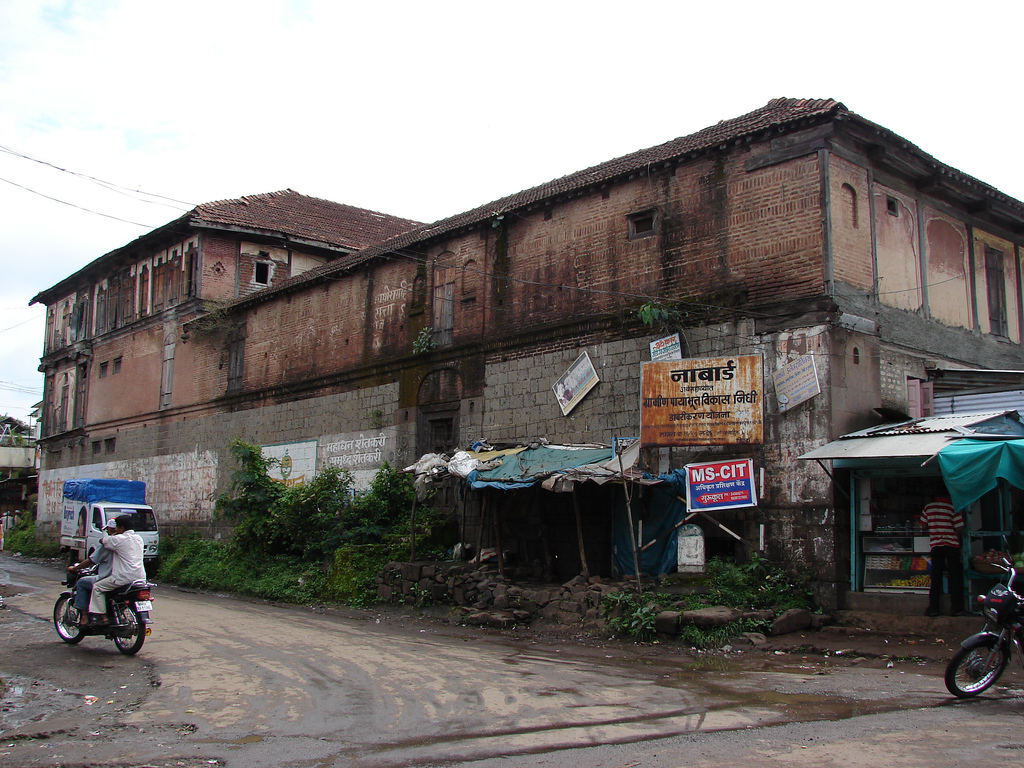
- Shivapur Vada bus stop

- Location in Maharashtra, India Khed Shivapur (India)
- Coordinates: 18°19′41.56″N 73°51′6.53″E
- Country: India
- State: Maharashtra
- District: Pune

Government
  - Body: Gram Panchayat

Languages
  - Official: Marathi
- Time zone: UTC+5:30 (IST)
- Postal code: 412205
- Vehicle registration: MH-
- Nearest city: Pune

Khed Shivapur is a village in the Pune district of Maharashtra, India, along National Highway 48. It is located 23 kilometres (14 mi) south of Pune.

The dargah of Hazrat Qamar Ali Darvesh is the major cultural heritage of the region attracting pilgrims from diverse religions.
