= Hari Narayan Apte =

Indian author

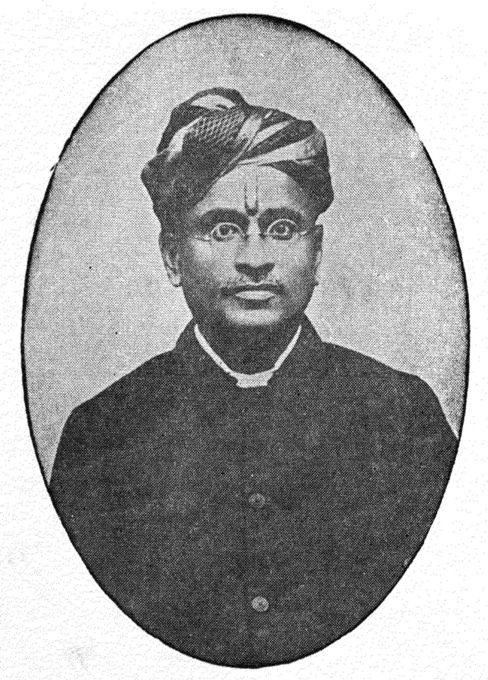
- Born: 8 March 1864; Parola, Bombay Presidency, British India
- Died: 3 March 1919 (aged 54)
- Occupations: Writer, novelist
- Writing career
- Language: Marathi
- Notable works: Gad Aala Pan Sinha Gela (historical novel); Pan Lakshat Kon Gheto

Hari Narayan Apte (8 March 1864 – 3 March 1919) was an Indian Marathi language writer.

Through his writings, he provided an eminent example to future Marathi fiction writers in respect of writing effective novels and short stories which faithfully reflect different aspects of contemporary society. Before him, novelists wrote novels like Gulabakawali with fantastic themes unrelated to realistic social situations.

Apte presided over Marathi Sahitya Sammelan in Akola in 1912.

== Early life ==
Apte was born in 1864 in the town of Parola in Khandesh district of Bombay Presidency, British India (now in Maharashtra) Currently Located in Jalgaon District. Shortly thereafter, his family moved to Bombay (now Mumbai) to stay there for a few years and then in 1878 to Poona (now Pune). According to the social custom of his times, his family married him off the next year at his age 15. (His wife died when he was 27. He remarried the next year.) Until his death in 1919, Apte spent the rest of his life in Pune.

British Raj ruled over India in the lifetime of Apte. Highly learned and first-rate social and political leaders in Maharashtra Vishnushastri Krushnashastri Chiplunkar , VasudevShastri Khare, Vaman Shivram Apte, Bal Gangadhar Tilak, and Gopal Ganesh Agarkar started in 1880 New English School in Pune with nationalistic fervor. During 1880–1883, Apte attended that school.

In 1883, Apte joined Deccan College. When, in 1885, Bal Gangadhar Tilak and Gopal Ganesh Agarkar newly started Fergusson College, Apte immediately shifted to that college. He was a brilliant student in all subjects except mathematics. Being unable to pass mathematics tests for three consecutive years, he disappointingly terminated his formal education in 1886 without receiving a college degree.

Apte voraciously read Marathi, Sanskrit, and English literature in his high school and college days, the last including plays of Shakespeare and Molière, novels of Walter Scott and George W. M. Reynolds, and poetry of John Keats and Percy Shelley. He also read the works of John Stuart Mill, Herbert Spencer, Edmund Burke, Francis Bacon, Thomas Macaulay and Samuel Johnson.

== Career ==
While Apte was in high school, in 1882, his teacher Gopal Ganesh Agarkar published a translation of Shakespeare's Hamlet into Marathi, naming it Wikar Wilasita (विकारविलसित). Apte wrote a 72-page critique of the translation, the critique receiving publication in the reputed literary magazine of those times Nibandh Chandrika (निबंध-चंद्रिका). Agarkar heartily congratulated Apte for his scholarly critique.

While in college, Apte wrote to high acclaim of Marathi readership his first novel Madhali Sthiti (मधली स्थिति) with reference to the then social life in Maharashtra. (The novel was an adaptation of George W.M. Reynold's Mysteries of London.)

Mhaisuracha Wagh (म्हैसूरचा वाघ) was Apte's first historical novel. (It was based on Meadows Taylor's English novel about Tipu Sultan.)

Apte wrote 8 novels concerning contemporary society and 10 historic novels. Powerful use of unadorned, everyday language and captivating description of apparently "mundane" social events formed the hallmark of his social novels.

== Magazine ==
In 1890, at his age 26, Apte founded weekly Karamanuk (करमणूक). The first chapter of his serialised novel Pan Lakshyat Kon Gheto (पण लक्षात कोण घेतो?) appeared in the inaugural issue of the weekly. He edited the weekly for 27 years, presenting to Marathi readership a vast body of literature which included novels, short stories, poems, thought-provoking essays, biographical sketches, translations, and adaptations.

== Other works ==
=== Social service ===
In an early article, Apte announced promotion of social reform in Maharashtra besides Marathi readers' entertainment as the important objective of his writings. He passionately promoted women's education when, in his days, the orthodox society discouraged it. He had once said that there is not a "single character in my social novels which I have not witnessed in the society.”

During 1897–1907, there was a plague epidemic in India, and Apte selflessly volunteered for the welfare of suffering public in Maharashtra. The ruling British government honoured his services with a Kaiser-i-Hind medal. In 1918, while he was working as a mayor of Pune municipality, there was an influenza epidemic in Maharashtra. Once again, Apte served the city's public with dedication.

== Bibliography ==
=== Social novels ===
- Madhali Sthiti (मधली स्थिति) (1885)
- Ganapatrao (गणपतराव) (1886)
- Pan Lakshyat Kon Gheto (पण लक्षात कोण घेतो?) (1890)
- Par Dhyan Kon Deta Hai (Hindi)
- Mee (मी) (1895)
- Jag He Ase Aahe (1899)
- Yashawantrao Khare (यशवंतराव खरे)
- Ajach (आजच)
- Bhayankar Diwya (भयंकर दिव्य)

=== Historic novels ===
- Mhaisuracha Wagh (म्हैसूरचा वाघ) (1890)
- Ushahkal (उषःकाल) (1896)
- Gad Ala Pan Simha Gela (गड आला पण सिंह गेला: (Gad ala pan sinh gela, a Marathi novel by Hari Narayan Apte was written in 1903)
- Sooryoday (सूर्योदय)
- Sooryagrahan (सूर्यग्रहण)
- Kewal Swarajyasathi (केवळ स्वराज्यासाठी)
- Madhyahna (मध्याह्न)
- Chandragupta (चंद्रगुप्त)
- Wajraghat (वज्राघात)
- Kalkut (कालकूट)
