= Sinhagad =

Hill Fort in Maharashtra, India

- Pune District, Maharashtra, India
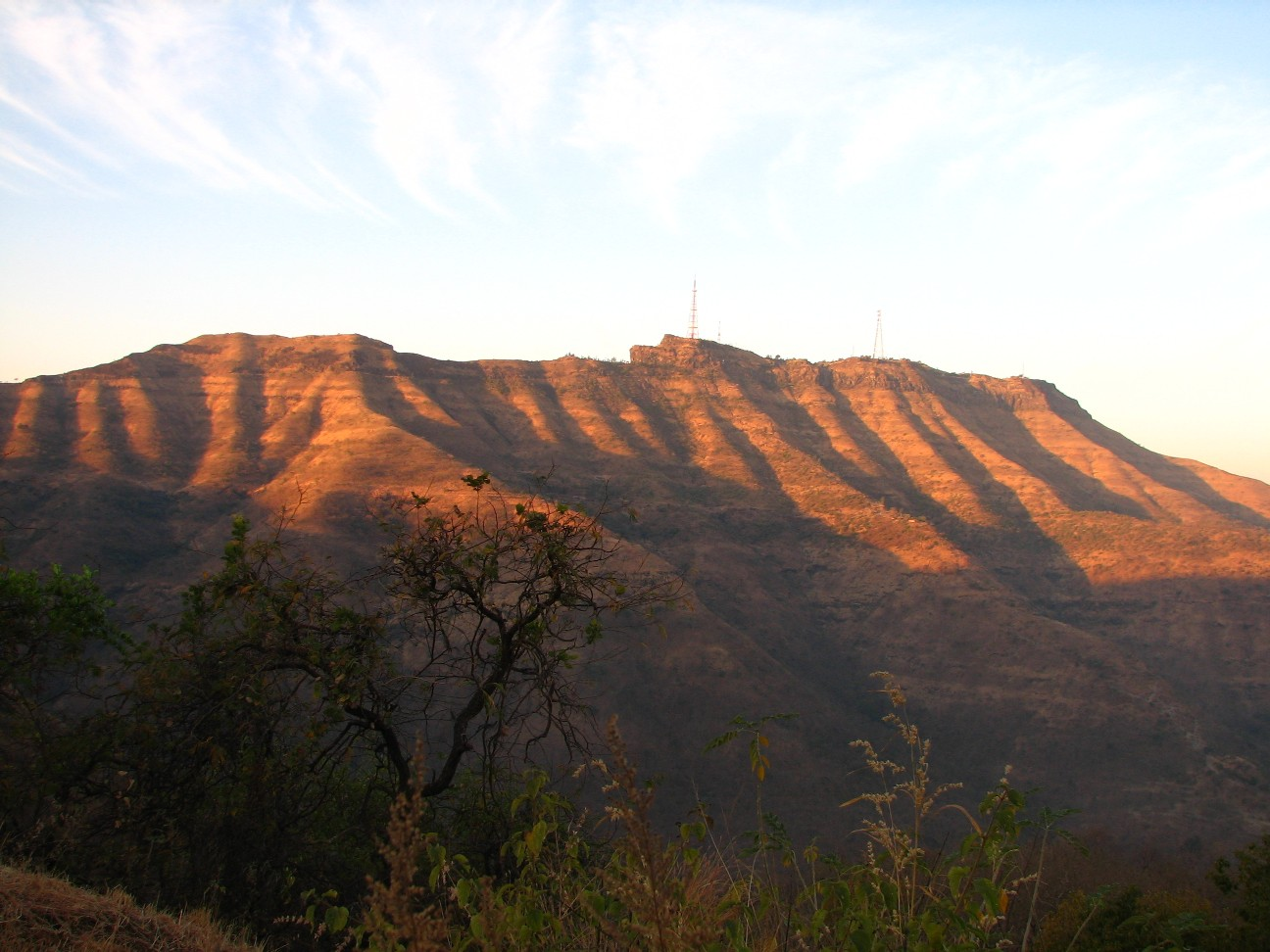
- Sinhagad Fort

Site information
- Type: Fort

Location
- Shown within Maharashtra
- Coordinates: 18°21′56.39″N 73°45′18.97″E
- Height: 1,317 metres (4,321 ft)

Sinhagad (also known as the Lion's Fort) is an ancient hill fortress located at around 28 kilometres southwest of Pune, India. Previously known as Kondhana, the fort has been the site of many battles, most notably the Battle of Sinhagad in 1670.This is the highest peaks of Pune.

The fort is a popular weekend destination for the residents of Pune. A road directly leads up to the summit of the fort. Hikers can get access to the summit from the base of the fort, with the trek involving a one-way walk of 2.7 km (1.6 miles), gaining approximately 600 metres (1950 feet) in elevation. Shared taxi services to the base as well as the summit are also available.

== Layout ==
Perched on an isolated cliff of the Bhuleswar range in the Sahyadri Mountains, the fort is situated on a hill about 760 metres (2,490 ft) above ground and 1,317 metres (4,321 ft) above mean sea level. On clear day, other forts associated with the Maratha empire, such as Rajgad, Purandar and Torna, can be seen from Sinhagad.

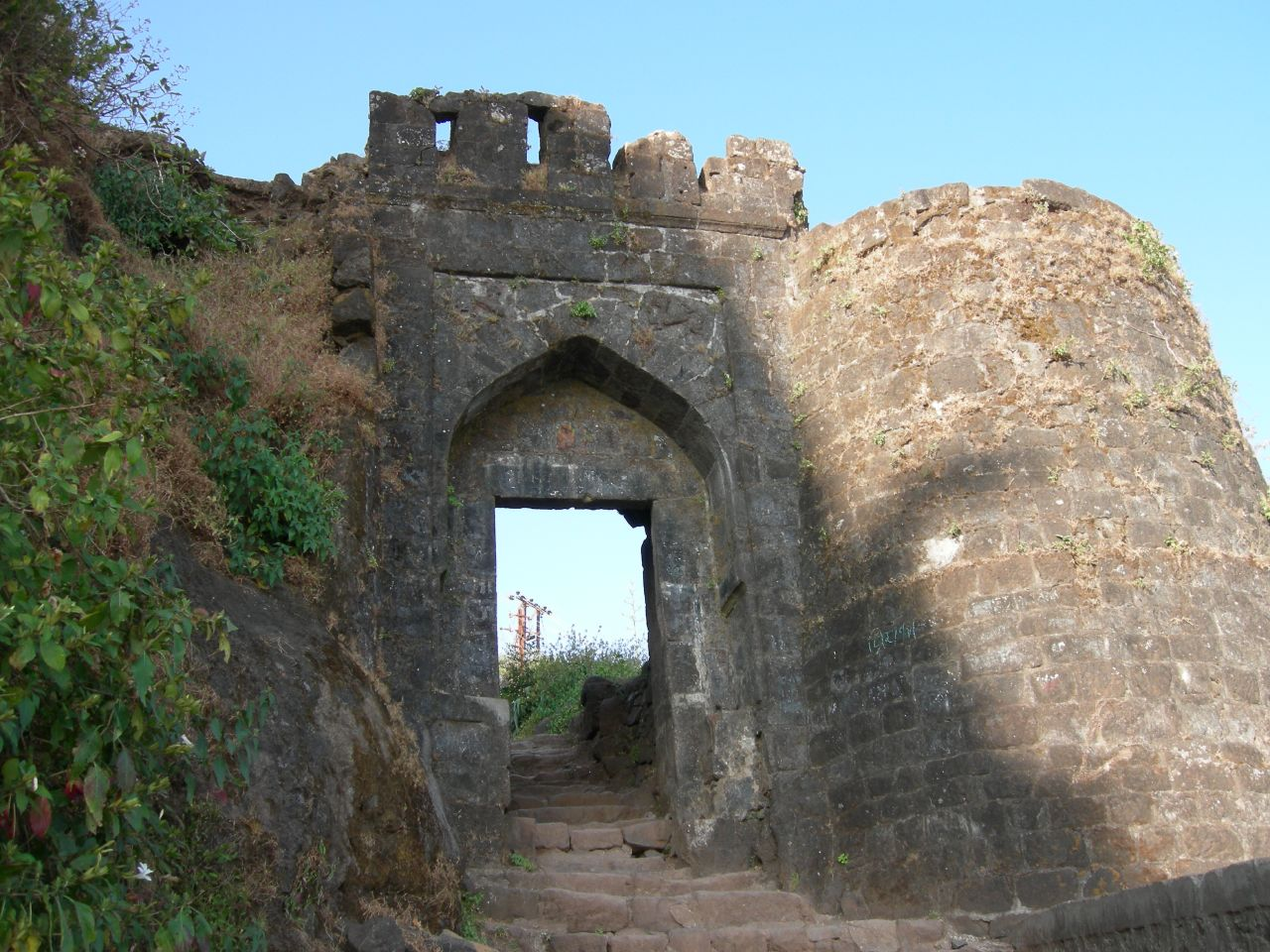
Pune Darwaja of Sinhagad fort

Sinhagad was strategically built to provide natural protection from the enemies due to the very steep slopes of the hill it was built upon. There are two entry gates called Pune darwaja and Kalyan darwaja to get into fort. Pune darwaja is towards north east while the Kalyan darwaja is towards the southeast.

The fort houses memorials of the Maratha general, Tanaji Malusare as well as that of Rajaram I, the third Maratha Chhatrapati. The original commemorative memorial of Tanaji Malusare was unearthed by the restoration workers in February 2019. The stone structure was found buried under cement, concrete, and layers of oil paint and is believed to be around 350 years old. There is military stable, a brewery and a temple of the goddess Kali along with a Hanuman statue to the right side of the temple.

The fort also houses a television relay tower set up in 1973 for relaying signals from Mumbai Doordarshan TV to Pune.

== History ==
=== Early history ===
The Sinhagad was initially known as "Kondhana" after the sage Kaundinya.

Until 14th century, the fort was held by Nag Naik. Nag Nayak was worshipped as a symbol of strength and held power over the strategically important mountain fortress. The fort was captured by forces of Muhammad bin Tughluq in 1328 from Koli chieftain Nag Naik after a siege of eight months and became part of Delhi Sultanate. It later became part of Bahmani Kingdom in mid 1300s followed by the Ahmadnagar Sultanate in late 1400s and Sultanate of Bijapur in late 1500s.

=== Medieval history ===
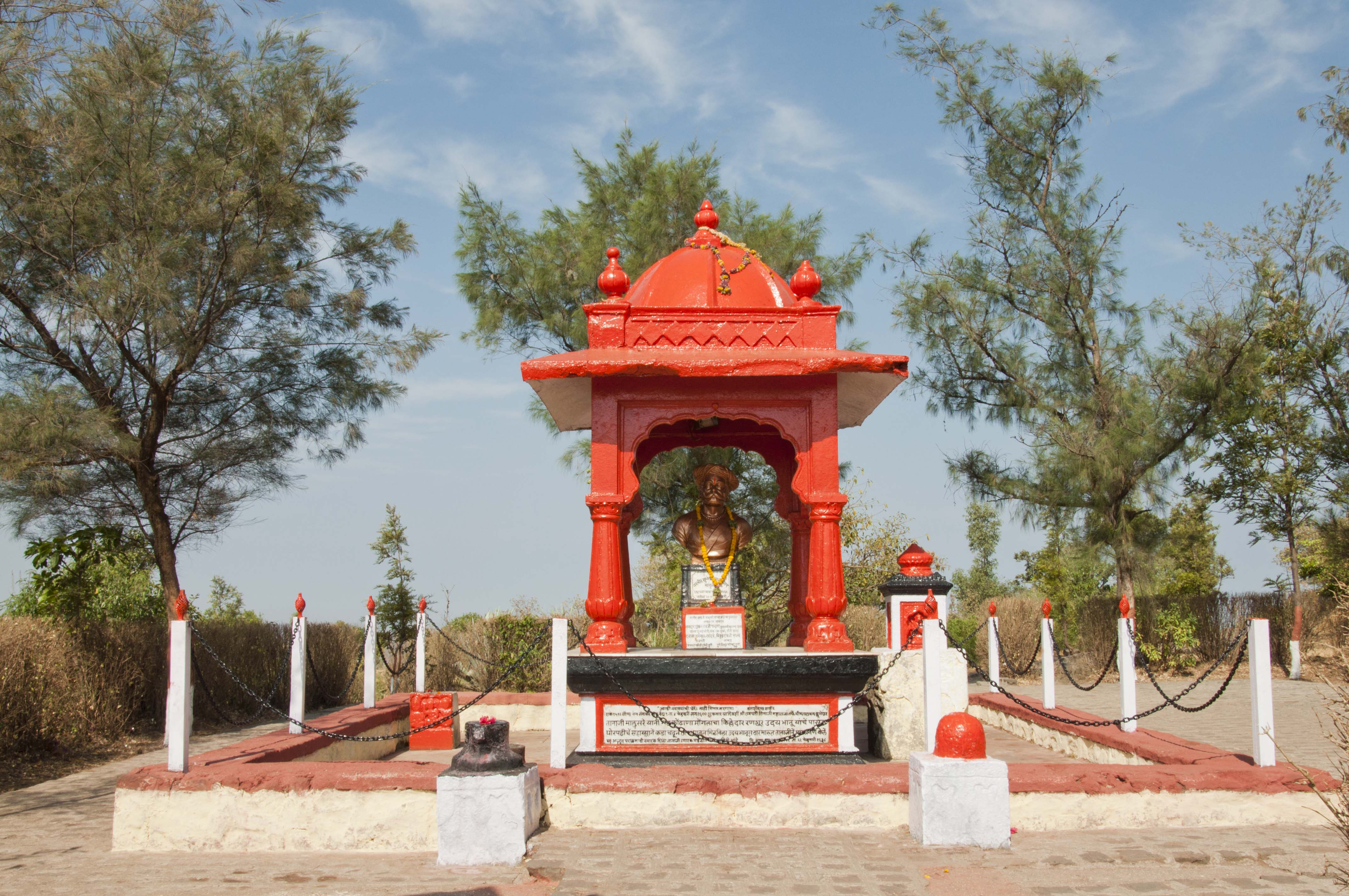
A memorial commemorating Tanaji Malusare atop the Sinhagad Fort. Despite being vastly outnumbered against the Mughal Army, this Maratha Sardar led his forces to a decisive victory in the Battle of Sinhagad (1670 CE)

Shahaji, as the commander of Ibrahim Adil Shah II of Sultanate of Bijapur was entrusted with the control of the Pune region. His son Shivaji, refused to accept the Sultanate of Bijapur and initiated the task of setting up Hindavi Swarajya. Shivaji gained control of Kondana in 1647 by convincing Siddi Amber, the Adilshahi Sardar who controlled the fort, that he, the son of Shahaji Bhosale, could manage the fort's defences optimally. Bapuji Mudgal Deshpande played a key role in this activity. Adil Shah jailed Siddi Amber for this treasonous act and schemed to get it back. He imprisoned Shahaji Bhosale for a concocted crime and informed Shivaji. In 1649, Adil Shah traded the fort for Shahaji's release.

Shivaji recaptured it in 1656 again with the help of Bapuji Mudgal Deshpande who convinced the Fort commander by giving land in the newly created Khed Shivapur village and peacefully gained control of the fort.

This fort saw attacks by Mughals in 1662, 1663, and 1665. In 1664, Shaista Khan, a Mughal general, tried to bribe the people of the fort to hand it over to him but was unsuccessful. Through the Treaty of Purandar (1665), that Shivaji entered into with Mughal general Mirza Raja Jai Singh I, the fort passed into the Mughal hands.

In 1670, Shivaji reconquered the fort for the third time through his Koli Subedar, Tanaji Malusare in Battle of Sinhagad, and the fort came and stayed under Maratha rule till 1689 A.D. A steep cliff leading to the fort was scaled in the dead of the night with the help of a tamed monitor lizard named "Yashwanti", colloquially known as a Ghorpad. Thereafter, a fierce battle ensued between Tanaji and his men versus the Mughal army headed by Udaybhan Singh Rathod, a Rajput Sardar who had control of the fort. Tanaji Malusare lost his life, but his brother Suryaji took over and captured the Kondana, now known as Sinhagad. There is an anecdote that upon hearing of Tanaji's death, Shivaji expressed his remorse with the words, "Gad ala, pan Sinha gela" - "The Fort is conquered, but the Lion is lost". Thus the fort was named as Sinhagad. A bust of Tanaji Malusare was established on the fort in memory of his contribution to the battle.

After the death of Sambhaji, the Mughals regained control of the fort. The Marathas headed by "Sardar Balkawade", recaptured it in 1693. Rajaram I took asylum in this fort during a Mogul raid on Satara. He died at the Fort on 3 March 1700 A.D. In 1703, Aurangzeb re-conquered the fort. In 1706, it once again went into the hands of the Marathas. Panaji Shivdev of Sangole, Visaji Chafer, and Shankar Narayan, the Pant Sachiv played a key role in this battle.

The fort remained under Maratha's rule till the year 1817. The more than one century of the Maratha rule saw the fort serving as a refuge from hostile forces attacking Pune, or as a place of confinement for rebels.

During the Third Anglo-Maratha War in 1817, the East India Company General Pritzler laid siege to the fort on the orders of Mountstuart Elphinstone, the company resident in Pune, and it passed into the British hands. The British retained it until 1947 post which it became part of India.

=== Modern history ===
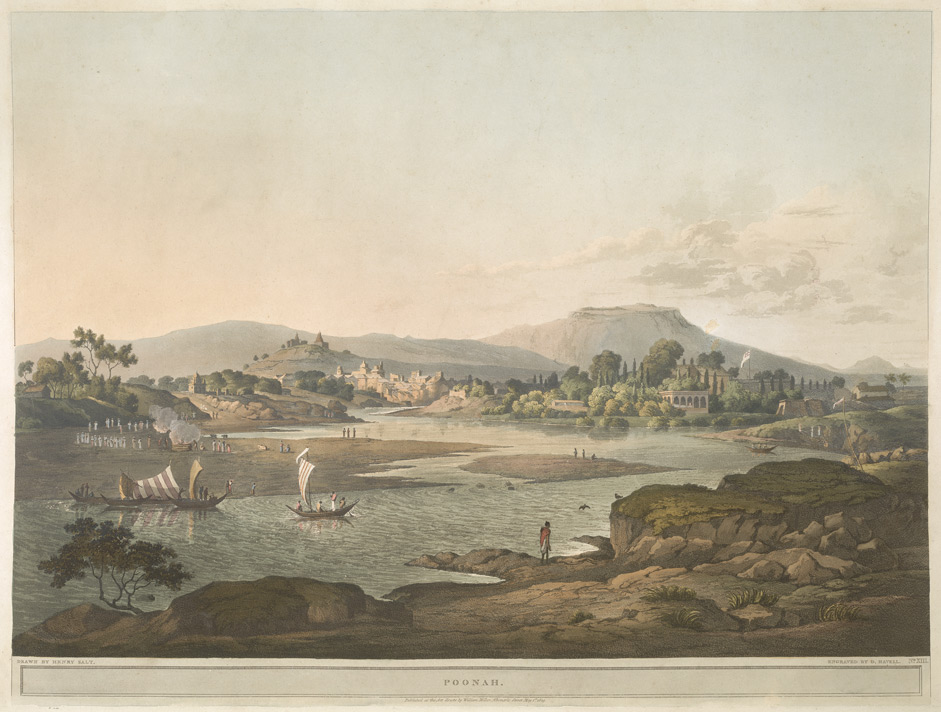
A watercolor painting of Pune dating back to the late Peshwa era by British artist, Henry Salt. The picture clearly depicts the towering Sinhagad fort in the background

The fort has played a vital role in India's freedom struggle. Bal Gangadhar Tilak also known as 'The Father of Indian Unrest', used the fort as a summer retreat. It is here where Mahatma Gandhi had a historic meeting with Tilak after his return from South Africa. The bungalow has his bust at the entrance.

A television relay station tower was set up in 1973 for broadcasting the Doordarshan TV to the Pune.

== Gallery ==
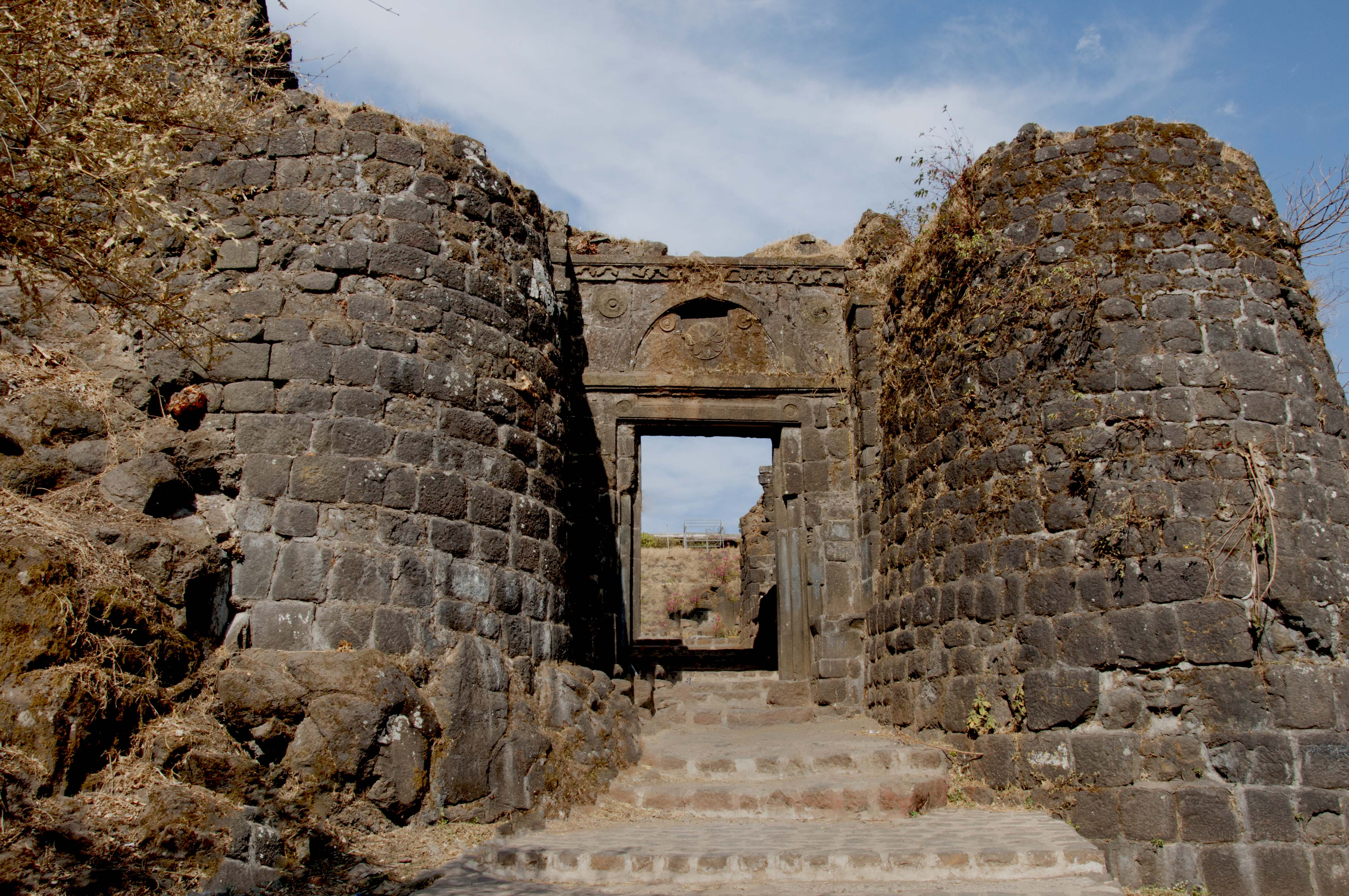
Pune Darwaja

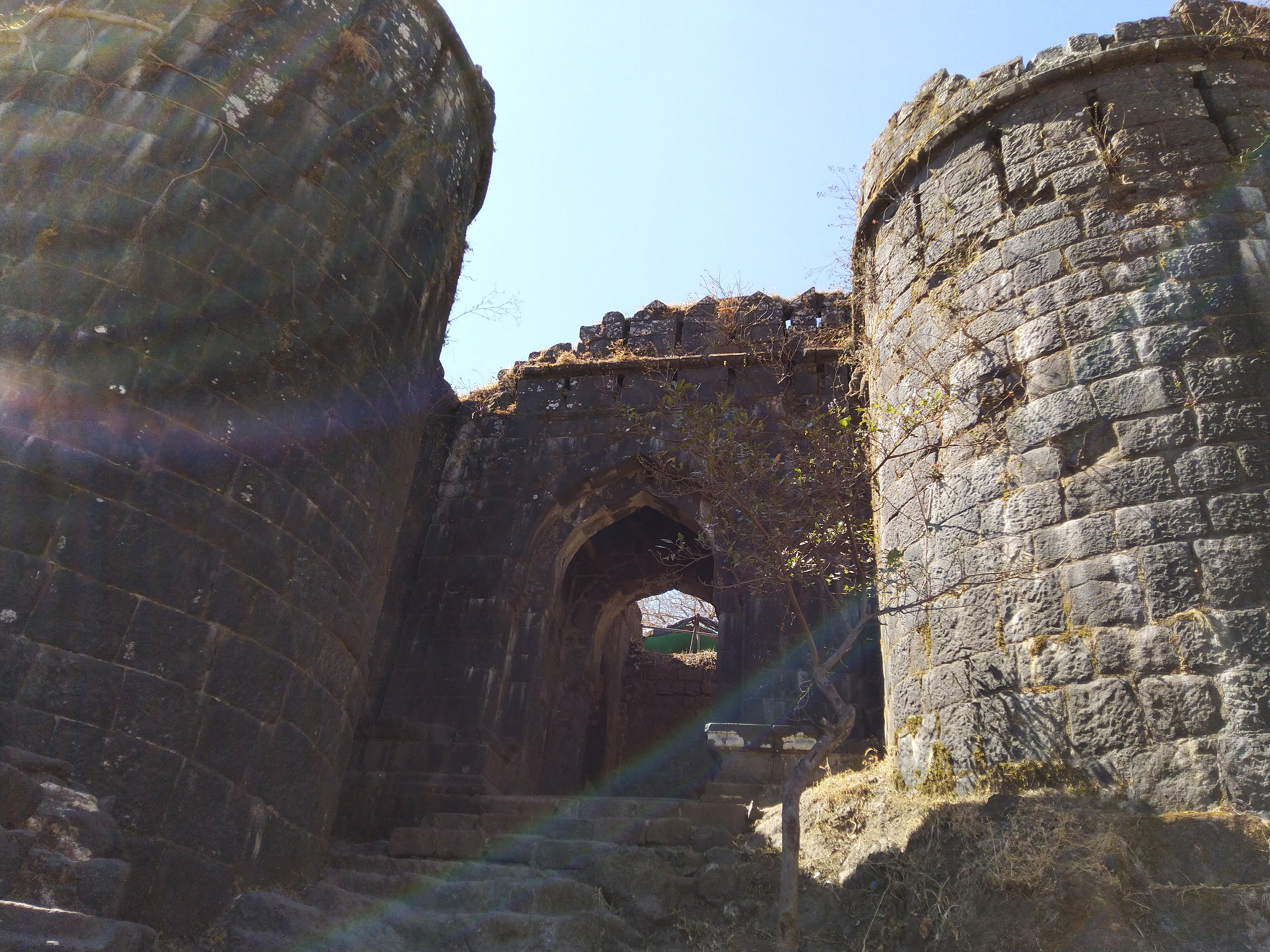
Kalyan Darwaja

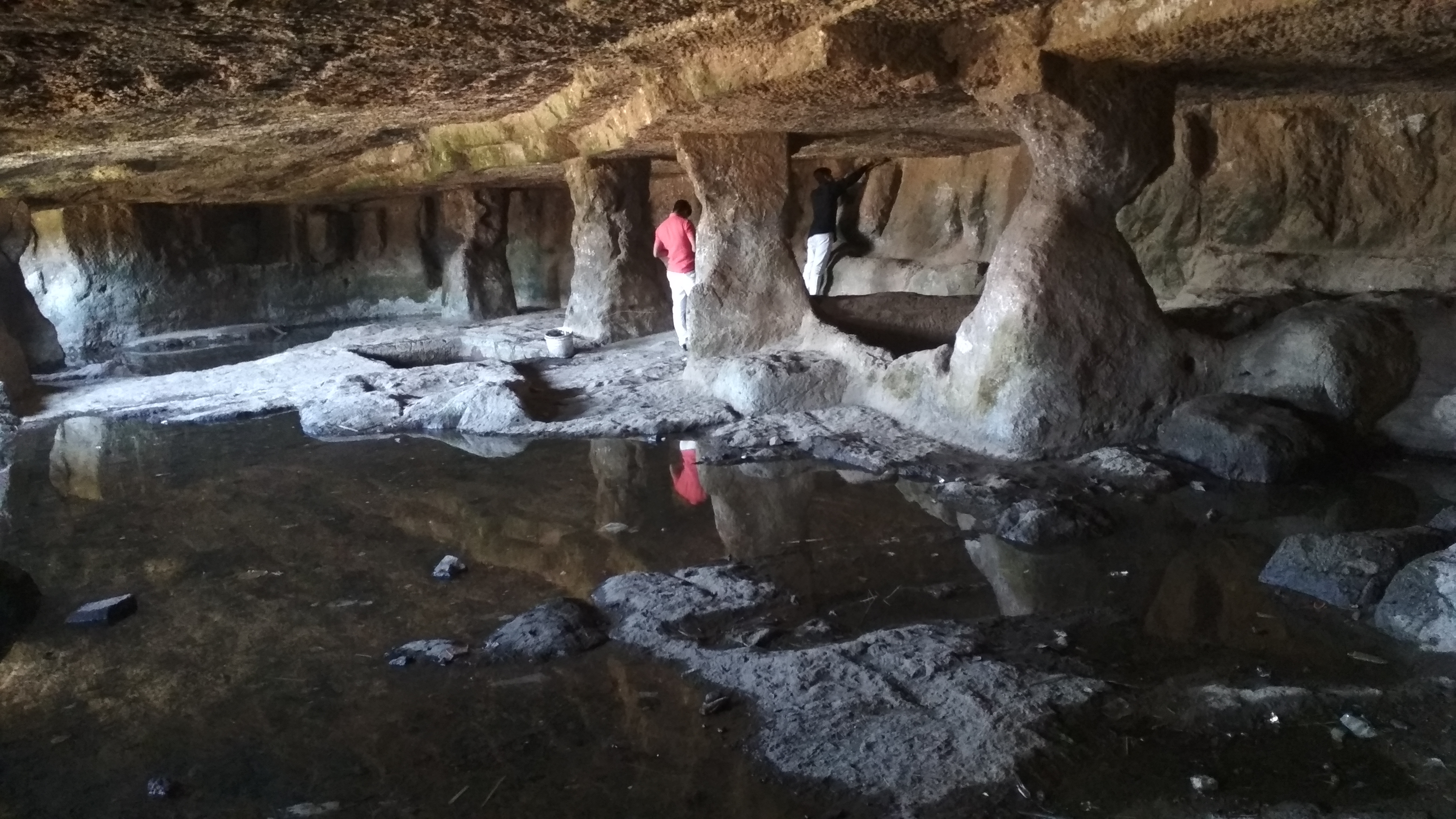
Horse and Elephant stables

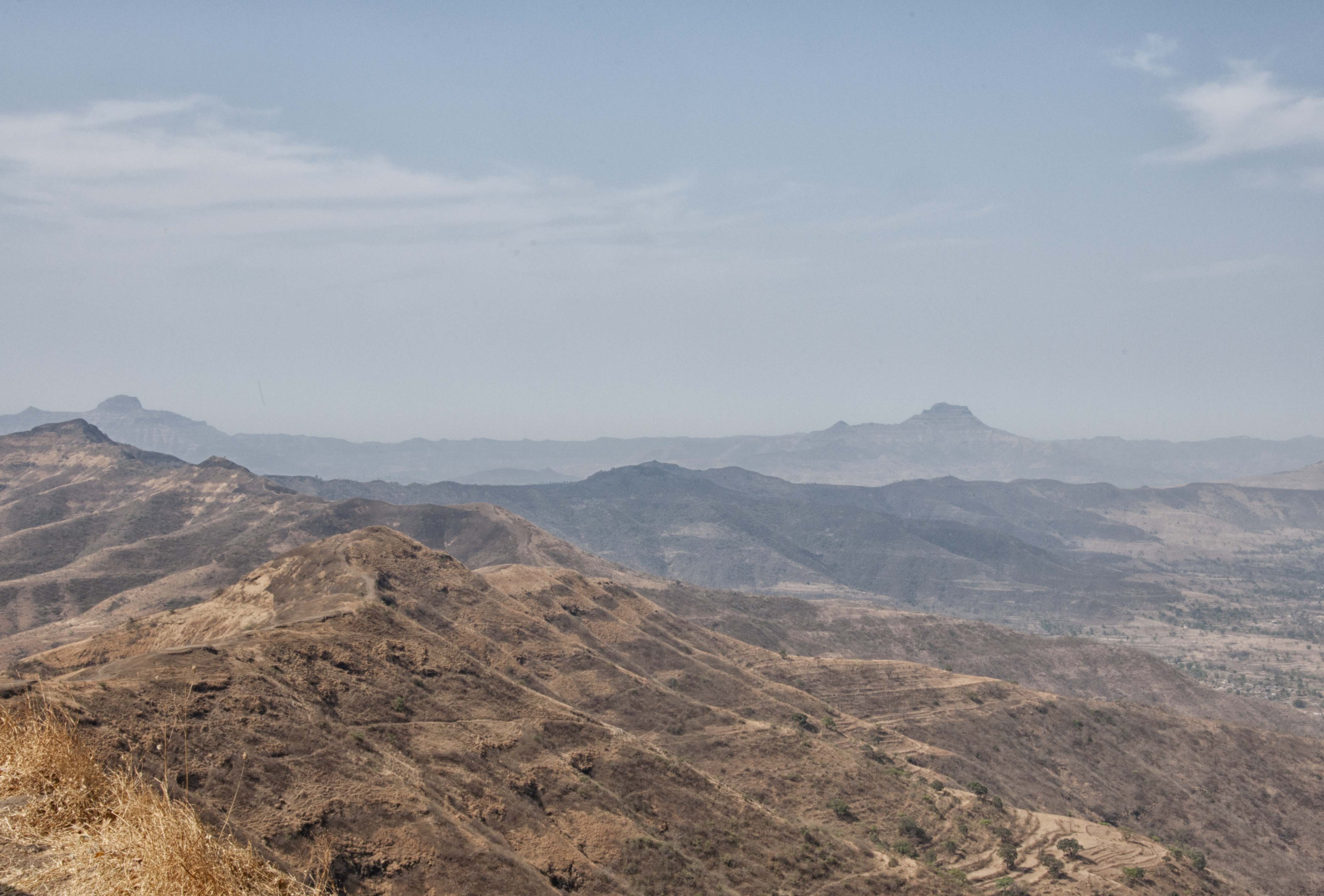
View of Torna Fort & Rajgad Forts from Sinhagad

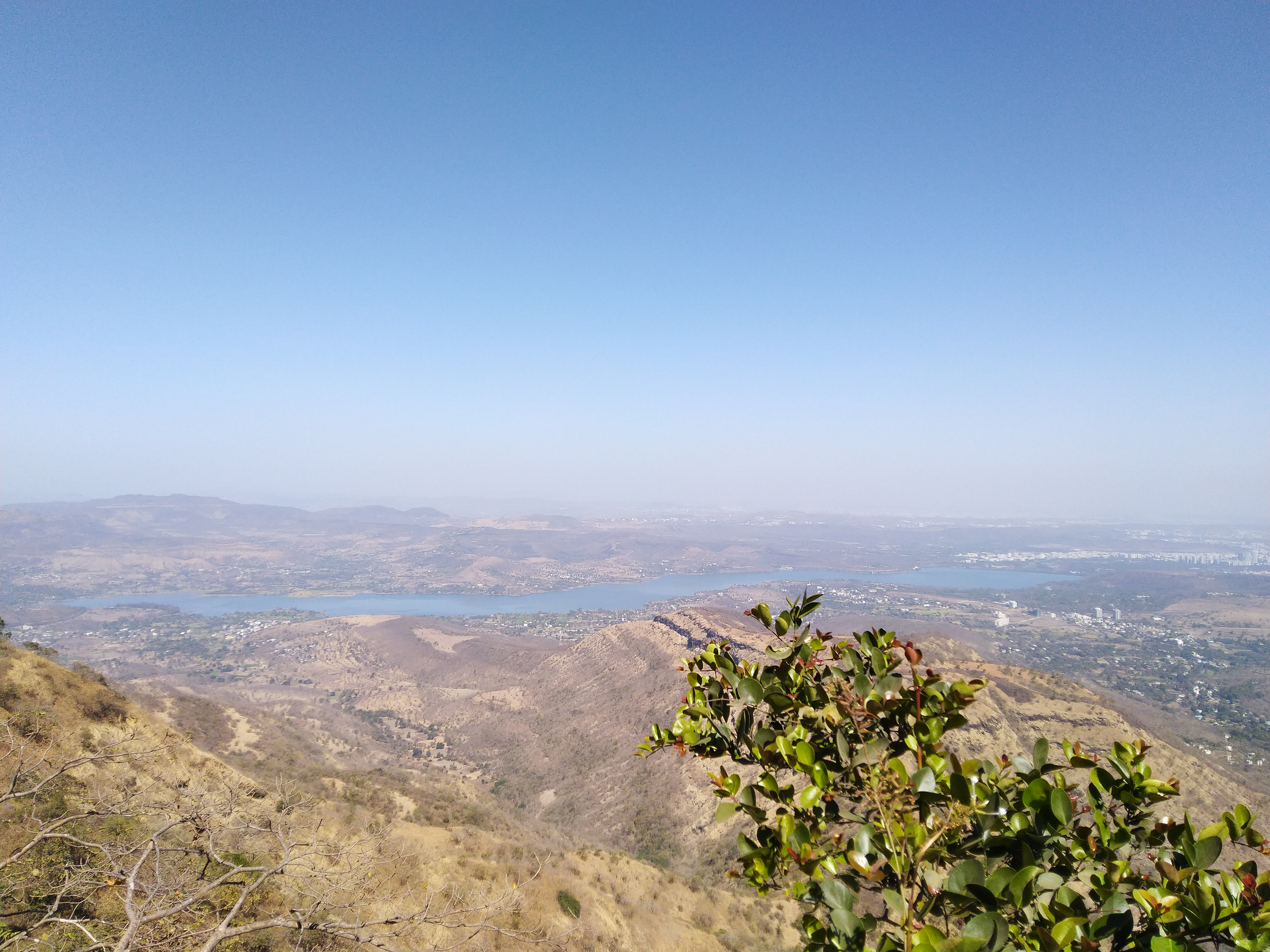
View of Khadakwasla Dam from Sinhagad

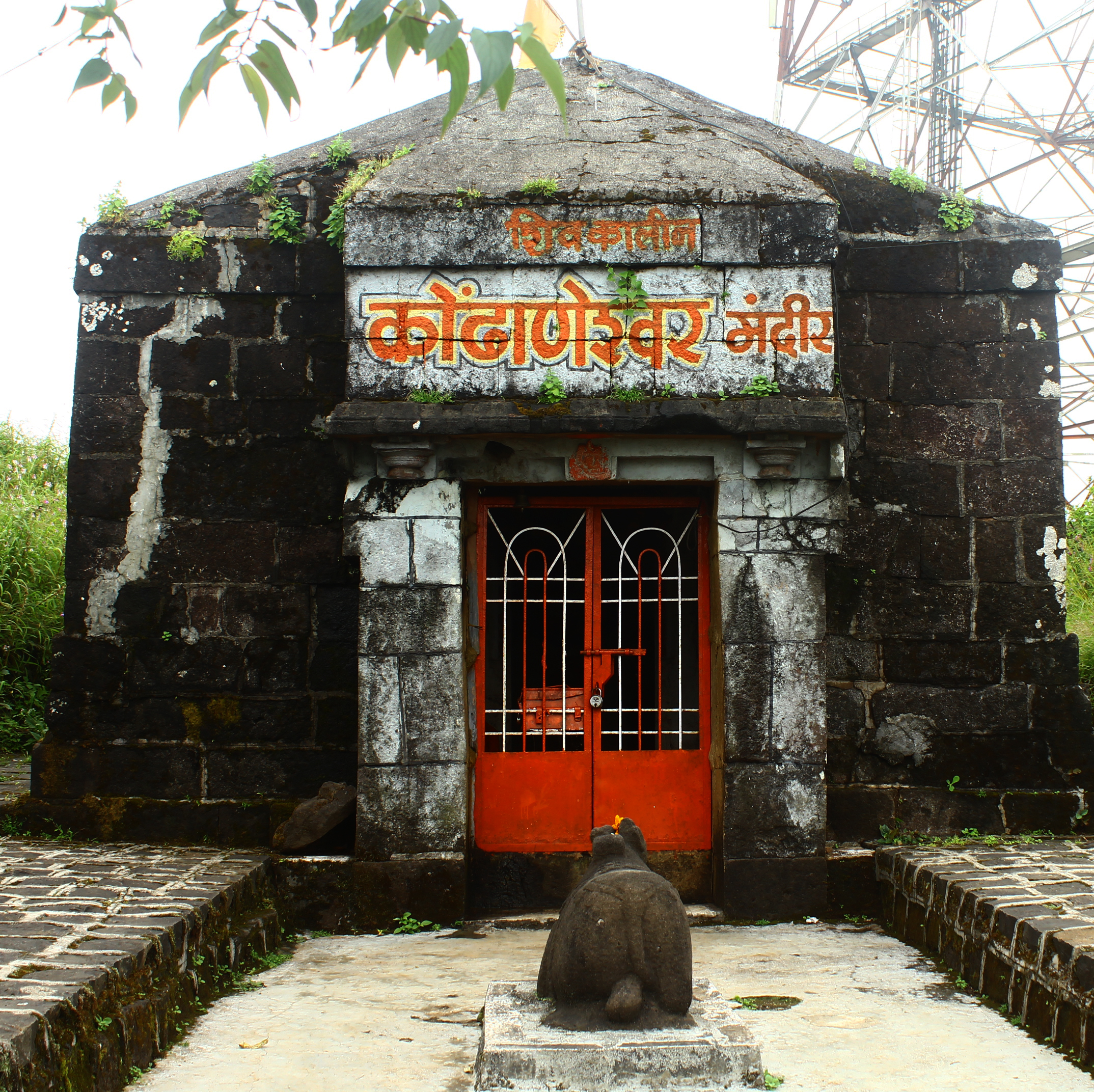
Kondhaneshwar Temple

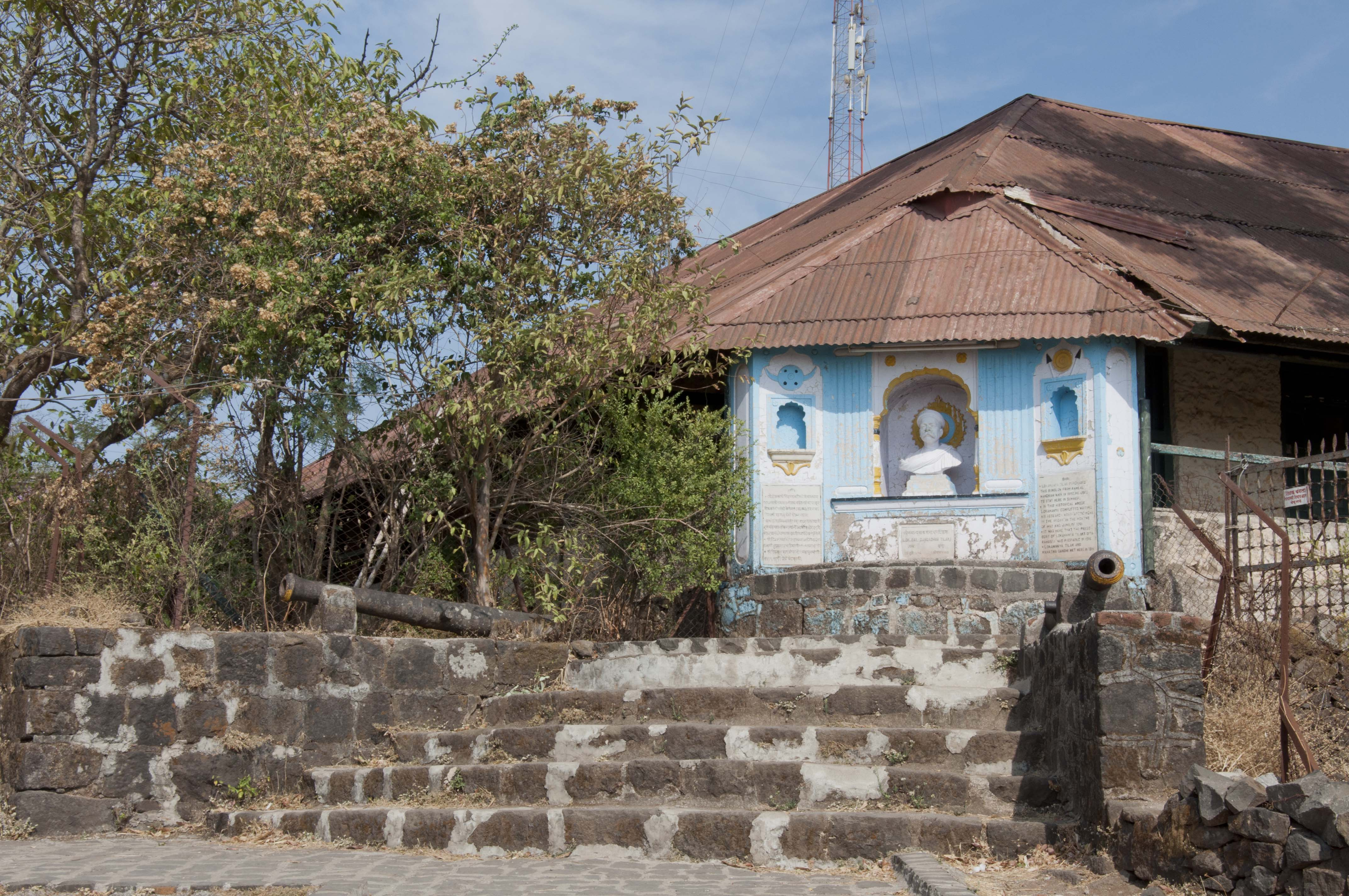
Lokmanya Tilak's Bungalow

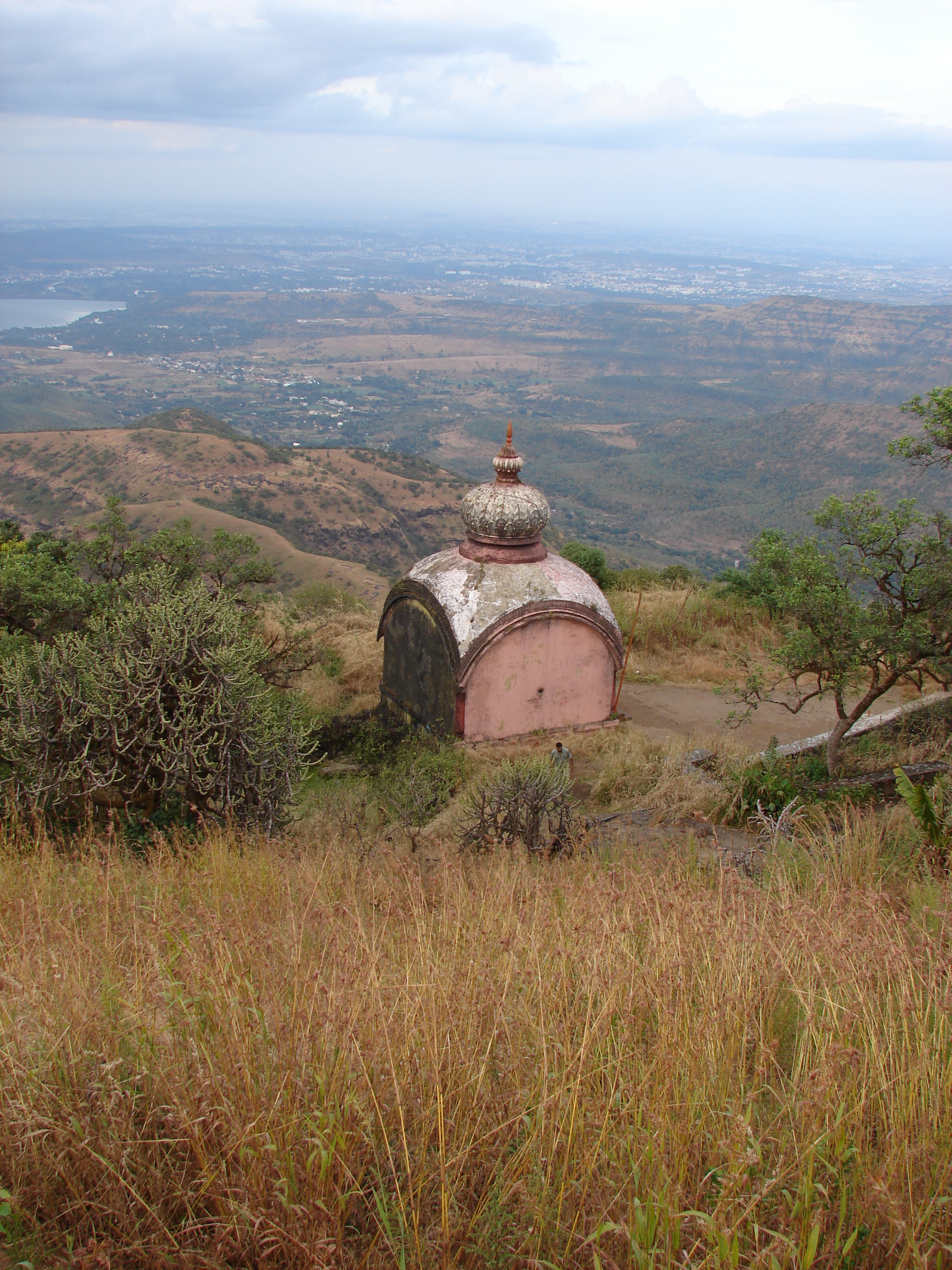
Rajaram cenotaph

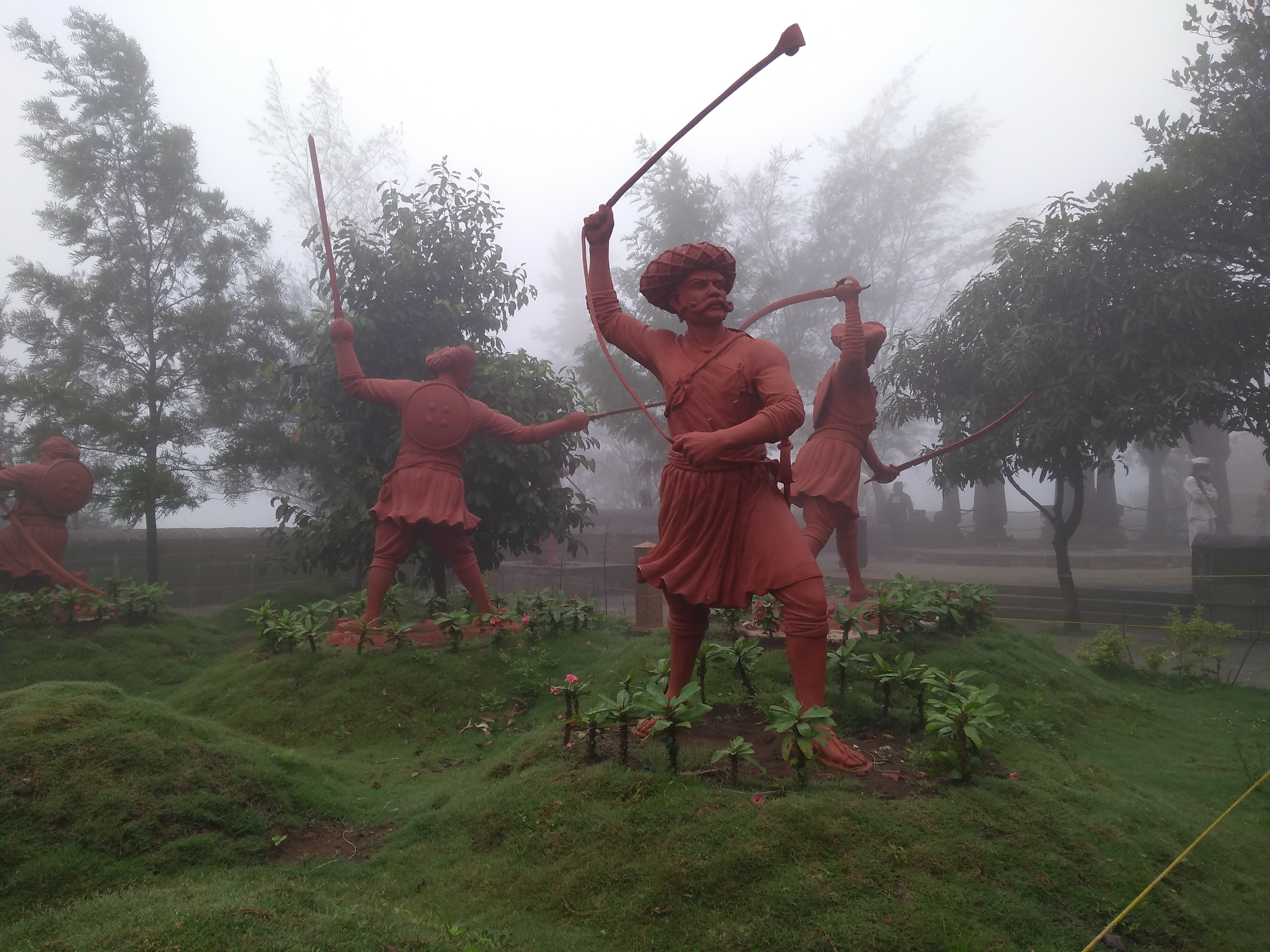
A memorial for Tanaji and his soldiers

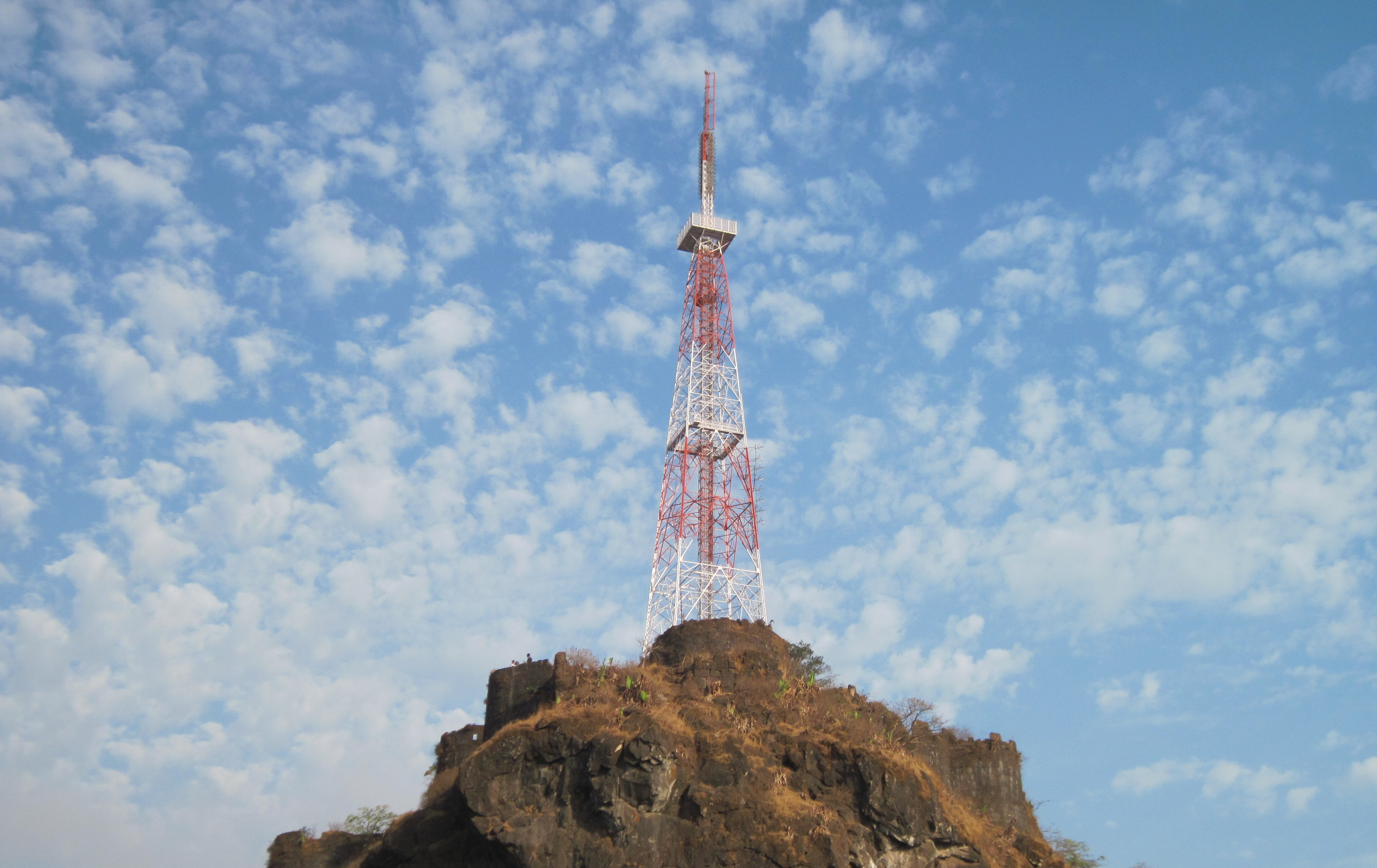
Sinhagad TV tower

== See also ==
- List of forts in Maharashtra
- Nag Nayak of Sinhagad
- Tanaji Malusare
- Shivaji
