= Sairat Zaala Ji =

- Official song cover

Song by Chinmayi Sripaada, Ajay Gogavale

from the album Sairat
- Language: Marathi
- Released: 11 April 2016
- Recorded: 2015–2016
- Studio: Sony Scoring Stage, Culver City, California
- Length: 6:17
- Label: Zee Music Company
- Songwriters: Ajay-Atul; Nagraj Manjule
- Composer: Ajay-Atul
- Producer: Ajay-Atul

Sairat track listing
- 1. "Yad Lagla"; 2. "Aatach Baya Ka Baavarla"; 3. "Sairat Zaala Ji"; 4. "Zingaat"

Music video
- Sairat Zaala Ji on YouTube

"Sairat Zaala Ji" (Note: Also spelled as Sairat Jhala Ji or Sairat Zala Ji.) is the title song of the 2016 Marathi-language Sairat, directed by Nagraj Manjule. It is composed and co-written by Ajay-Atul and sung by Chinmayi Sripaada alongside Ajay Gogavale. The song is portrayed by film leads Akash Thosar and Rinku Rajguru. The Times of India included a song in their list of the top 10 Marathi romantic songs.

== Credits ==
- Ajay-Atul – composer, producers, co-writers
- Chinmayi Sripaada – vocals
- Ajay Gogavale – vocals
- Nagraj Manjule – lyricist
- Sudhakar Reddy Yakkanti – cinematographer
- Kutub Inamdar – editor
- Vijay Dayal – recording and mix
- Avinash B. Sonwane – sound design

== Music video ==
The track is filmed on Akash Thosar (Parshya) and Rinku Rajguru (Archi). The song depicts the primary couple's romantic moments and their love tale.

Several scenes from the song's picturization were later deleted by the Censor Board. These scenes can be seen in the censored copy of this song. But while showing this song in theatres, many of its scenes were deleted.

== Critical reception ==
Mihir Bhanage of The Times of India wrote "Ajay and Chinmayi Sripada sing this duet which has a breezy quality to it."

Sujan Sengupta of Daily News and Analysis wrote "Sairat Jhala Ji, uses more Marathi elements and hints at being influenced by the great Ilayaraja. The song is majestic, with Gogavale partnering with Chinmayi Sripada. In fact, the only song in the soundtrack that bears any resemblance to the run-of-the-mill commercial film music of today is Zingaat, in which Ajay-Atul have used modern elements such as synthesizers and electronic drums."

== Awards and nominations ==
Year	Award	Category	Recipient (s) and Nominee (s)	Result	Ref.
2017	Filmfare Awards Marathi	Best Playback Singer – Female	Chinmayi	Won	
2023	Mirchi Music Awards Marathi	Composer of the Year	Ajay-Atul	Won	
2023	Mirchi Music Awards Marathi	Song Recording and Mixing of the Year	Vijay Dayal	Won	
2016	Maharashtracha Favourite Kon?	Favourite Song	"Sairat Zaala Ji"	Nominated	
2016	Maharashtracha Favourite Kon?	Favourite Male Playback Singer	Ajay Gogavale	Nominated	
2016	Maharashtracha Favourite Kon?	Favourite Female Playback Singer	Chinmayi	Nominated	
