= Dhadak (soundtrack) =

Soundtrack album by Ajay–Atul
- Released: 2 July 2018
- Recorded: 2017–2018
- Genre: Feature film soundtrack
- Length: 17:01
- Language: Hindi
- Label: Zee Music Company

Ajay–Atul chronology
Brothers (2015)	Dhadak (2018)	Thugs of Hindostan (2018)
External audio
- Audio Jukebox on YouTube

Dhadak is the soundtrack album to the 2018 film of the same name directed by Shashank Khaitan and produced by Dharma Productions and Zee Studios. A remake of the Marathi film Sairat (2016), the film stars Ishaan Khatter and Janhvi Kapoor in their film debuts. The soundtrack album featured four songs composed by Ajay–Atul and written by Amitabh Bhattacharya. The album was released through Zee Music Company on 2 July 2018.

== Background ==
Ajay–Atul, who composed music for the original film Sairat, returned to score music for Dhadak. They wanted the film's music to be cinematic and dramatic and utilized international soundscape and wanted to appeal listeners across all ages, resulting in a variety of genres from classical to pop and having a bigger sound than the original. The duo had composed two original songs—the title track "Dhadak" and "Vaara Re"—and also sampled two songs from Sairat: "Zingaat" and "Yad Lagla" being remade as "Zingaat" and "Pehli Baar". The vocals were primarily recorded by the duo, except for the title track which Ajay had recorded it with Shreya Ghoshal.

== Release ==
The title track was released as a single on 19 June 2018. The song received nine million views within 24 hours of its release and subsequently topped the music charts, particularly at the Mirchi Music Top 20 Countdown and Jio Music weekly Top 20 for five consecutive weeks. The second single "Zingaat" was released on 27 June 2018. The third song "Pehli Baar" was released on 2 July, along with the soundtrack album.

== Track listing ==
No.	Title	Singer(s)	Length
1.	"Dhadak"	Ajay Gogavale, Shreya Ghoshal	4:03
2.	"Zingaat"	Ajay Gogavale, Atul Gogavale	3:46
3.	"Pehli Baar"	Ajay Gogavale	5:15
4.	"Vaara Re"	Ajay Gogavale	3:57
Total length:			17:01

== Reception ==
Devansh Sharma of Firstpost wrote "Johar’s move to stick to Ajay-Atul for the Dhadak album turns out to be a wise decision. They retain the sanctity of the original album, while not completely resting their laurels on the same. Besides minor yet creative tweaks to the two adapted songs, they unite their energies with Bhattacharya and Ghoshal to come up with a title song that is at par with the original album." Debarati S Sen of The Times of India wrote "The combination of composers Ajay-Atul and lyricist Amitabh Bhattacharya, is a win-win one and you end up rooting for not just the melodious music, but also the heartfelt words. And that is why 'Dhadak's' original tracks touch you to the core." Dhaval Roy of Daily News and Analysis wrote "One cannot talk about the album and ignore the fine job that Amitabh Bhattacharya has done with the lyrics" adding that "[Bhattacharya] displays finesse almost everywhere." Joginder Tuteja of Bollywood Hungama wrote "Dhadak is a very good soundtrack and has the entire package of composition, writing and singing coming together. As a matter of fact one just wishes that there were a couple of more songs in there. This is a kind of album that grows on you after repeated hearing. If and when the film emerges successful, expect the songs to become all the more popular."

Kennith Roasario of The Hindu wrote "The music finds its origins in Sairat, barring Dhadak's title track, which manages to stand out, both in impact and picturisation." Rahul Desai of Film Companion wrote "Its music, Ajay-Atul's readjustment of their own Sairat score, is more of a soundtrack than a feeling." A reviewer from Indo-Asian News Service stated "The music is a highlight of the film and "Pehli Baar", is beautifully picturised. The title song "Dhadak" is soulful and sets the mood of their life. The sheer beat and pace of "Zingaat" makes it a treat to watch as well."

== Accolades ==
Award (Note: Awards, festivals and organizations are in alphabetical order.)	Date of ceremony (Note: Each date is linked to the article about the awards held that year, wherever possible.)	Category	Recipient(s)	Result	Ref.
Filmfare Awards	23 March 2019	Best Music Director	Ajay–Atul	Nominated	
International Indian Film Academy Awards	18 September 2019	Best Lyricist	Amitabh Bhattacharya – "Dhadak"	Won	
Mirchi Music Awards	16 February 2019	Music Composer of The Year	Ajay–Atul – "Dhadak"	Nominated	
Mirchi Music Awards	16 February 2019	Male Vocalist of The Year	Ajay Gogavale – "Dhadak"	Nominated	
Mirchi Music Awards	16 February 2019	Female Vocalist of The Year	Shreya Ghoshal – "Dhadak"	Nominated	
Mirchi Music Awards	16 February 2019	Best Background Score of The Year	John Stewart Eduri	Nominated	
Mirchi Music Awards	16 February 2019	Best Song Producer (Programming & Arranging)	Ajay–Atul – "Dhadak"	Won	
Mirchi Music Awards	16 February 2019	Listeners' Choice Song of the Year	"Zingaat"	Nominated	
Screen Awards	16 December 2018	Best Music Director	Ajay–Atul	Nominated	
Zee Cine Awards	19 March 2019	Best Music Director	Ajay–Atul	Nominated	
Zee Cine Awards	19 March 2019	Best Lyricist	Amitabh Bhattacharya – "Dhadak"	Nominated	
Zee Cine Awards	19 March 2019	Best Male Playback Singer	Ajay Gogavale – "Dhadak"	Nominated	
Zee Cine Awards	19 March 2019	Best Female Playback Singer	Shreya Ghoshal – "Dhadak"	Nominated	
Zee Cine Awards	19 March 2019	Song of the Year	"Zingaat"	Nominated	
