= Sairat (soundtrack) =

- Soundtrack album cover for Sairat

Soundtrack album by Ajay–Atul
- Released: 1 April 2016
- Recorded: 2015–2016
- Studios: Sony Scoring Stage, Culver City, California
- Genre: Film soundtrack
- Length: 20:55
- Language: Marathi
- Label: Zee Music Company
- Producer: Ajay–Atul

Ajay–Atul chronology
Nilkanth Master (2015)	Sairat (2016)	Jaundya Na Balasaheb (2016)

Sairat is the soundtrack album composed and written by Ajay–Atul, to the 2016 Marathi film Sairat, directed by Nagraj Manjule that stars Rinku Rajguru and Akash Thosar in lead roles. The film was produced by Nitin Keni, Nikhil Sane and Nagraj Manjule under the productions Zee Studios, Essel Vision Productions and Aatpat Productions. The four-song soundtrack was released under the Zee Music Company label on 1 April 2016, to critical acclaim and fetched numerous accolades. Sairat notably the first Indian film to record the musical score at the Sony Scoring Stage in California.

== Development ==
The soundtrack to Sairat featured four songs composed and written by Ajay–Atul and featured vocals by Ajay Gogavale, Shreya Ghoshal and Chinmayi; the duo had previously associated with Manjule on Fandry (2013). The music consisted of Western classical, though the lyrics were "rustic", with a "rural lingo". Manjule added that the language and songs in the film differ from other films where characters inexplicably become poets.

Most of the compositions were emphasized on melody, with the folk elements (which had been the duo's signature) is also prominent throughout the soundtrack. The orchestral symphonies were used and blended throughout the soundtrack as according to the duo, "the authenticity of the symphonies will work like a cherry on the cake".

The duo recorded the musical score at Sony Scoring Stage in Culver City, California, a first for an Indian film. The 66-person orchestra – including a 45-piece string section, six-piece woodwind section, 13-piece brass section, six-piece horn section and a harp – was conducted by Mark Graham. The duo added that recording the score at Hollywood made the technical standards at high calibre which attributed to the quality of the film's music and listening pleasure of the songs.

== Track listing ==
No.	Title	Lyrics	Singer(s)	Length
1.	"Yad Lagla"	Ajay–Atul	Ajay Gogavale	05:14
2.	"Aatach Baya Ka Baavarla"	Ajay–Atul	Shreya Ghoshal	05:34
3.	"Sairat Zaala Ji"	Ajay–Atul, Nagraj Manjule	Chinmayi, Ajay Gogavale	06:09
4.	"Zingaat"	Ajay–Atul	Ajay–Atul	03:46
Total length:				20:43

== Reception ==
=== Critical response ===
Mihir Bhanage of The Times of India called the film's music a "rarity" and "addictive": "It makes you fall in love with the songs from the word go." Sankhyana Ghosh of The Hindu also gave the album a positive review: "With joyous melodies and stirring orchestral touches, Sairat is an example of old-fashioned film music done right." Lalitha Suhasini of The Indian Express wrote that the score was "audacious" and "makes you laugh, cry and want to fall in love." Vipin Nair of Music Aloud described the soundtrack as "brilliant", and Karthik Srinivasan of Milliblog described that the duo are on "a staggering high".

=== Commercial response ===
Sairat's soundtrack was streamed over 1.2 billion times on music streaming services, becoming the first and only Marathi album to achieve this feat. "Zingaat" became the most-viewed Marathi song on YouTube, garnering around 450 million views as of June 2021. Ajay–Atul described on the soundtrack's success, saying:

"It is very overwhelming to see the audiences appreciating and loving the music album even today. We have now been able to cross the benchmark that this album has set not only in Marathi cinema, but in the entire Indian film industry. We are grateful to our audiences who have showered the soundtrack with so much love and have helped make this an industry trendsetter."

== Accolades ==
Award	Category	Recipient(s) and nominee(s)	Result	Ref.
Filmfare Awards Marathi	Best Music Director	Ajay–Atul	Won	
Filmfare Awards Marathi	Best Lyricist	Ajay–Atul – ("Yad Lagla")	Won	
Filmfare Awards Marathi	Best Playback Singer – Male	Ajay Gogavale – ("Yad Lagla")	Won	
Filmfare Awards Marathi	Best Playback Singer – Male	Ajay–Atul – ("Zingaat")	Nominated	
Filmfare Awards Marathi	Best Playback Singer – Female	Chinmayi – ("Sairat Zaala Ji")	Won	
Filmfare Awards Marathi	Best Playback Singer – Female	Shreya Ghoshal – ("Aatach Baya")	Nominated	
Filmfare Awards Marathi	Best Background Score	Ajay–Atul	Won	
Mirchi Music Awards Marathi	Album of the Year	Sairat	Won	
Mirchi Music Awards Marathi	Song of the Year	"Yad Lagla"	Won	
Mirchi Music Awards Marathi	Male Vocalist of the Year	Ajay Gogavale – ("Yad Lagla")	Won	
Mirchi Music Awards Marathi	Composer of the Year	Ajay–Atul – ("Sairat Zaala Ji")	Won	
Mirchi Music Awards Marathi	Programmer and Arranger of the Year	Ajay–Atul – ("Yad Lagla")	Won	
Mirchi Music Awards Marathi	Song Recording and Mixing of the Year	Vijay Dayal – ("Sairat Zaala Ji")	Won	
