= Yad Lagla =

- Official song cover, featuring Akash Thosar and Rinku Rajguru

Song by Ajay Gogavale

from the album Sairat
- Language: Marathi
- English title: I've gone insane
- Released: 20 April 2016
- Recorded: 2015–2016
- Studio: Sony Scoring Stage, Culver City, California
- Genre: Indian music
- Length: 5:19
- Label: Zee Music Company
- Songwriter: Ajay-Atul
- Composer: Ajay-Atul
- Producer: Ajay-Atul

Sairat track listing
- 1. "Yad Lagla"; 2. "Aatach Baya Ka Baavarla"; 3. "Sairat Zaala Ji"; 4. "Zingaat"

Music video
- Yad Lagla – The Official Song – Sairat on YouTube

"Yad Lagla" is a 2016 Indian Marathi-language song from the soundtrack album of the film Sairat, directed and co-written by Nagraj Manjule. The song is written and composed by Ajay-Atul, sung by Ajay Gogavale. The music video of the track features actors Akash Thosar and Rinku Rajguru. "Yad Lagla" was remade in Hindi as "Pehli Baar" for the Sairat's Hindi remake Dhadak, starred Ishaan Khatter and Janhvi Kapoor. The Times of India included song in their list of Top 10 Marathi romantic songs.

== Background ==
The song is composed by Ajay-Atul, dominated by operatic Western musical instruments such as the violin and the cello. It was recorded at the Sony Scoring Stage in California.

== Music video ==
The song is picturised on Akash Thosar and Rinku Rajguru. The song depicts the early moments of Parshya and Archi's blossoming romance, as she falls madly in love.

== Release ==
The song was digitally released on 20 April 2016 on YouTube and became an instant hit after release, the soundtrack album crossed 1.2 billion views.

== Critical reception ==
The Hindu wrote "Yad Lagla is a soaring pine-fest of an Ajay-Atul composition, manifests the entire euphoric timeline of puppy love between its notes. Sweeping novels, epic musicals and towering three-hour-long cinematic extravaganzas have waxed giddy about the complexities of this phase; 'love-at-first-sight' has long been art's most prolific breeder. But arguably, no evanescent sound has storyboarded its essence the way this does." Sujan Sengupta of Daily News and Analysis wrote "It brings out the duo’s [Ajay-Atul] compositional skill and musical expertise, with Ajay’s vocals emphasising these aspects." Mihir Bhanage of The Times of India wrote "Ajay variates from low to high pitch and back with ease throughout the song and one can't get enough of the song despite playing it in repeat mode."

== Accolades ==
Year	Award	Category	Recipient (s) and Nominee (s)	Result	Ref.
2016	Filmfare Awards Marathi	Best Lyricist	Ajay-Atul	Won	
2016	Filmfare Awards Marathi	Best Playback Singer – Male	Ajay Gogavale	Won	
2023	Mirchi Music Awards Marathi	Song of the Year	"Yad Lagla"	Won	
2023	Mirchi Music Awards Marathi	Male Vocalist of the Year	Ajay Gogavale	Won	
2023	Mirchi Music Awards Marathi	Programmer and Arranger of the Year	Ajay-Atul	Won	
2016	Maharashtracha Favourite Kon?	Favourite song	"Yad Lagla"	Nominated	
2022	Zee Chitra Gaurav Puraskar	Zee Chitra Gaurav Puraskar for Best Lyricist	Ajay-Atul	Won	
