= MFK Award for Favourite Song =

Indian film award

Maharashtracha Favourite Kon? for Favourite Song
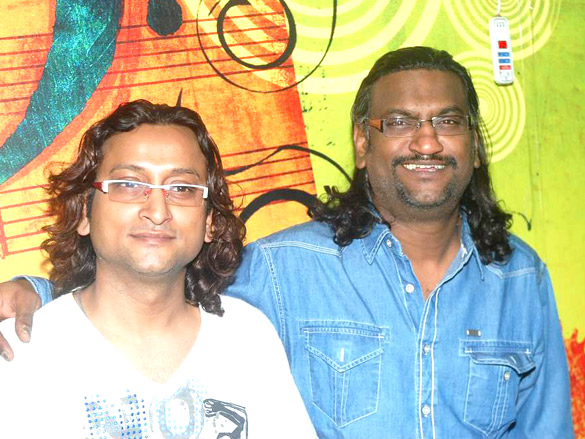
- The 2022 recipient: Ajay-Atul for "Sukh Kalale" from Ved
- Awarded for: Best Song of the Year
- Country: India
- Presented by: Zee Talkies
- First award: Ajay-Atul, for "Morya Morya" from Uladhaal (2009)
- Currently held by: Ajay-Atul, for "Sukh Kalale" from Ved (2023)

Maharashtracha Favourite Kon? Award for Favourite Song is given by Zee Talkies as part of its annual Maharashtracha Favourite Kon? ceremony for Marathi films in India. The award was first given in 2009.

== Superlatives ==
Superlatives	Music director	Record
Most awards	Ajay Atul	6
Most nominations	Ajay Atul	13
Most nominations	Amitraj	9
Most nominations in a single year	Ajay Atul (2016)	4
Most consecutive year nominations	Amitraj (2018–2022)	4

== Winners and nominees ==
Year	Photos of winners	Actor	Song	Film	Ref.
2009		Ajay Atul †	Morya Morya	Uladhaal	
2009		Ajit-Atul-Sameer	De Dhakka	De Dhakka	
2009		Ashok Patki	Gori Gauri	Galgale Nighale	
2010		Ajay Atul †	Wajle Ki Bara	Natarang	
2010		Atul, Ajit	O Raje	Me Shivajiraje Bhosale Boltoy	
2010		Avadhoot Gupte	Vitthala Konta Zenda	Zenda	
2011		Ashok Patki †	Hey Bhaskara	Mee Sindhutai Sapkal	
2011		Kaushal Inamdar	Chinmaya Sakal Hridaya	Balgandharva	
2011		Avinash-Vishwajeet	Kadhi Tu	Mumbai-Pune-Mumbai	
2012		Avadhoot Gupte †	Ganadhisha	Morya	
2012		Mangesh Dhakade	Deva Tula Shodhu Kutha	Deool	
2012		Ashok Patki	Jaganyacha Paya	Tukaram	
2013		Pankaj Padghan †	Tik Tik Vajate Dokyaat	Duniyadari	
2013		Amitraj	Deva Tujhya Gabharyala	Duniyadari	
2013		Amitraj	Zindagi Zindagi	Duniyadari	
2013		Vishal-Shekar	Karuya Aata	Balak Palak	
2013		Vishal-Shekar	Haravali Pakhare	Balak Palak	
2014		Ajay Atul †	Mauli Mauli	Lai Bhaari	
2015		Hrishikesh-Saurabh-Jasraj †	Kiti Sangaychay Mala	Double Seat	
2015		Hrishikesh-Saurabh-Jasraj	Man Suddha Tuzha	Double Seat	
2015		Amitraj	Teri Meri Yariyan	Classmates	
2015		Anand Modak	Dagad Dagad	Elizabeth Ekadashi	
2015		Chinar - Mahesh	Waou Waou	Timepass 2	
2015		Chinar - Mahesh	Sunya Sunya	Timepass 2	
2016		Ajay Atul †	Zingaat	Sairat	
2016		Ajay Atul	Yad Lagla	Sairat	
2016		Ajay Atul	Sairat Zaala Ji	Sairat	
2016		Ajay Atul	Aatach Baya Ka Bavarla	Sairat	
2016		Shankar–Ehsaan–Loy	Sur Niragas Ho	Katyar Kaljat Ghusali	
2016		Amitraj	Awaaz Vadhav Dj	Poshter Girl	
2017		Avinash-Vishwajeet †	Hrudayat Vaje Something	Ti Saddhya Kay Karte	
2017		Rohan-Rohan	Baba	Ventilator	
2017		Rohan-Rohan	Ya Re Ya	Ventilator	
2017		Ajay Atul	Baby Bring It On	Jaundya Na Balasaheb	
2017		Ajay Atul	Dolby Walya	Jaundya Na Balasaheb	
2017		Avadhoot Gupte	Lagnalu	Boyz	
2018		AV Prafullachandra †	Jau De Nav	Naal	
2018		Avadhoot Gupte	Goti Soda	Boyz 2	
2018		Amitraj	Khandala Ghat	Ye Re Ye Re Paisa	
2018		Amitraj	Ye Re Ye Re Paisa	Ye Re Ye Re Paisa	
2018		Narendra Bhide	Ararara	Mulshi Pattern	
2018		Vijay Narayan Gavande	Devak Kalji Re	Redu	
2019		Amitraj †	Tula Japnar Aahe	Khari Biscuit	
2019		Suraj-Dhiraj	Khari	Khari Biscuit	
2019		Amitraj	Shivrajyabhishek Geet	Hirkani	
2019		Devdutta Manisha Baji	Reni Fadkti Lakho Zende	Fatteshikast	
2019		Devdutta Manisha Baji	Tu Jogwa Vaad Mai	Fatteshikast	
2019		Hrishikesh-Saurabh-Jasraj	Rang Maliyela	Anandi Gopal	
2021		Ajay Atul †	Zingaat	Sairat	
2021		Ajay Atul	Wajle Ki Baara	Natarang	
2021		Ajay Atul	Mauli Mauli	Lai Bhaari	
2021		Ashok Patki	Hey Bhaskara	Mee Sindhutai Sapkal	
2021		Avadhoot Gupte	Ganadhisha	Morya	
2021		Pankaj Padghan	Tik Tik Vajate Dokyaat	Duniyadari	
2021		Hrishikesh-Saurabh-Jasraj	Kiti Sangaichay Mala	Double Seat	
2021		Avinash–Vishwajeet	Hrudayat Vaje Something	Ti Saddhya Kay Karte	
2021		AV Prafullachandra	Jau De Nav	Naal	
2021		Amitraj	Tula Japnar Aahe	Khari Biscuit	
2022		Ajay Atul †	Chandra	Chandramukhi	
2022		Devdutta Manisha Baji	Shivba Raja	Sher Shivraj	
2022		Rohan-Rohan	Angaat Aalaya	Zombivli	
2022		Avadhoot Gupte	Kelewali	Pandu	
2022		Avadhoot Gupte	Bhurum Bhurum	Pandu	
2022		Avinash-Vishwajeet	Guru Pournima	Dharmaveer	
2022		Amitraj	Sai Tujha Lekaru	Timepass 3	
2022		Hitesh Modak	De Punha Dhakka	De Dhakka 2	
