= Sneha Shankar =

Indian singer )

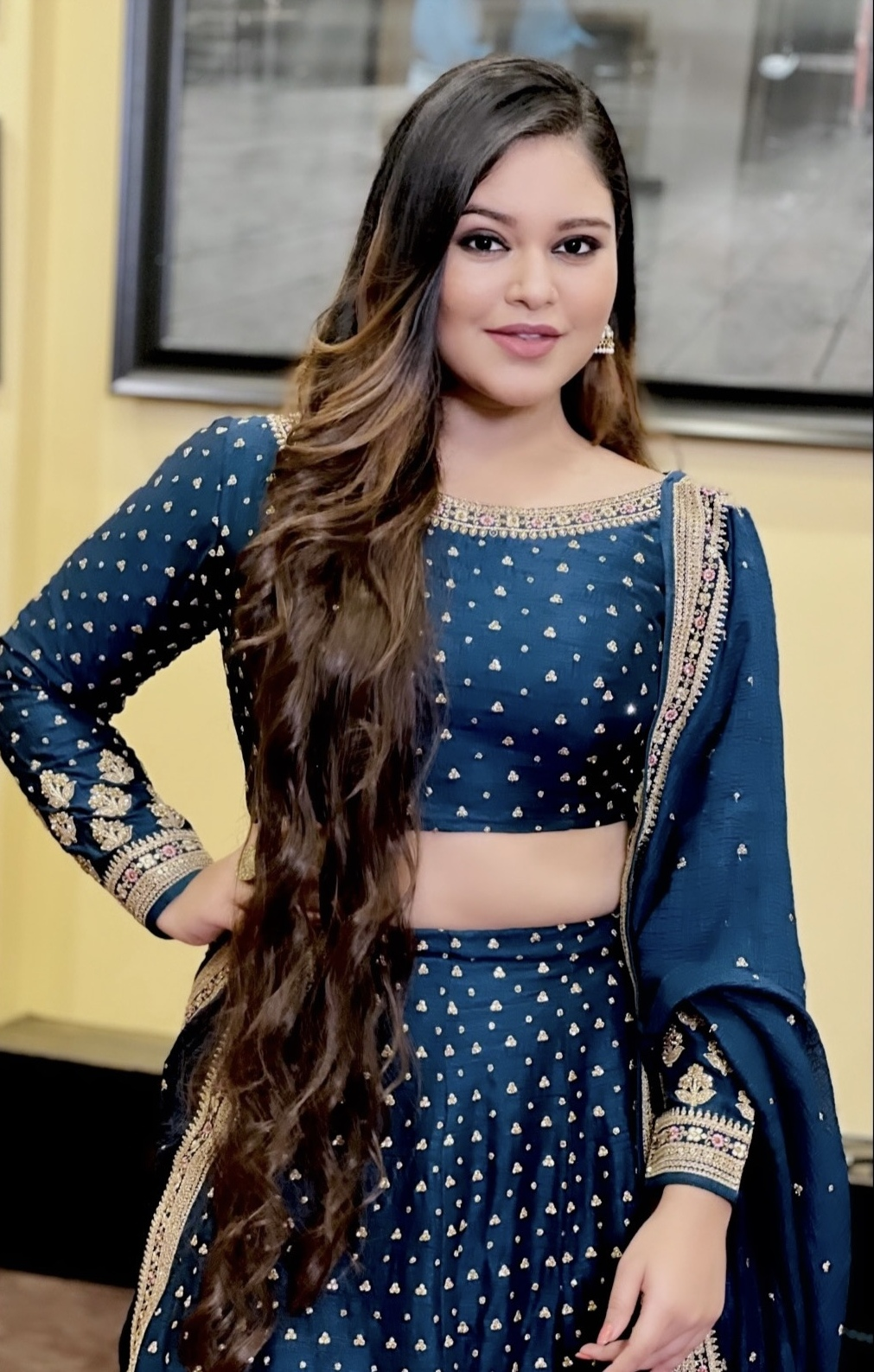
- Sneha Shankar in 2024
- Born: 1 February 2006 (age 20); Mumbai, Maharashtra, India
- Occupations: Playback singer; live performer
- Years active: 2012–present
- Father: Ram Shankar
- Musical career
- Genres: Bollywood; Sufi; ghazal; pop; Hindustani classical music; filmi
- Instrument: Vocals
- Labels: T-Series; Zee Music; Saregama

Sneha Shankar is an Indian playback singer.

== Early life ==
Sneha is the daughter of singer and music director Ram Shankar, and granddaughter of Shankar of the Sufi singers duo Shankar-Shambhu. At the age of six she appeared in a TV show MTV Sound Trippin on MTV India.

== Career ==
Sneha participated in various singing reality shows including Superstar Singer and Indian Idol - Season 15.

In 2019 she sang for the Hindi version of a Hollywood movie The Lion King.

She has worked with various music composers including Himesh Reshammiya, Sneha Khanwalkar, Amit Trivedi, and Jeet Gannguli.

== Discography ==
=== Film songs ===
Denotes films that have not yet been released

Year	Film	Song	Music	Lyrics	Note	Ref.
2017	Hanuman: Da' Damdaar	"Hanuman Chalisa"	Sneha Khanwalkar		credited as Sneha Pandit	
2019	The Lion King	"Main Banoon Raja Aaj Hi"				
2022	Chup: Revenge of the Artist	"Yeh Duniya Agar Mil Bhi Jaye"	Sneha Khanwalkar	Sahir Ludhianvi		
2025	Thug Life	"Chand Ke Tukde"	A. R. Rahman	Mehboob	Hindi version	

=== Non-film songs ===
Year	Song	Music	Lyrics	Co-singer(s)	Note	Ref.
2022	"Irada Kar Liya Hai Humne"	Dushyant	Alok Srivastava	Shaan	Education anthem of the Government of Delhi by Aam Admi Party	

=== Television appearances ===
Year	Show	Song	Channel	Note	Ref.
2017	MTV Sound Trippin	"Nain Matakka"	MTV India	season 2, episode 1	

=== Singles ===
Year	Song	Music	Co-singer(s)	Ref.
2020	"Yaad Piya Ki Aaye"	Aditya Shankar	Salman Ali	
2023	"Adhoore Khwaab"	Himesh Reshammiya	—N/a	
2023	"Choodiyaan Khanke"	Himesh Reshammiya	Ankush Bhardwaj	
2023	"Har Justajoo"	Himesh Reshammiya	Tabish Ali	
2024	"Mera Mehboob"	Himesh Reshammiya	—N/a	

=== TV serial songs ===
Year	Film	Song	Music	Lyrics	Co-singer(s)	Ref.
2016	Naamkarann	"Aa Leke Chalu Tujhko"	Jeet Ganguly	Vijay Vijawatt	Palak Muchhal	
2018	Meri Durga	Tittle track	Sneha Khanvilkar			
2020	Ek Duje Ke Vaaste 2	Tittle track	Aadil Prashant		Abhishek Gaur	

== Awards ==
=== Indian Television Academy Awards ===
Year	Nominee / work	Category	Result	Ref.
2018	Meri Durga	Best Singer	Nominated	
