= MFK Award for Favourite Female Debut =

Maharashtra Film Award

Maharashtracha Favourite Kon? for Favourite Female Debut
- Awarded for: Best Debut Performance by a Female Actor
- Country: India
- Presented by: Zee Talkies
- First award: Rinku Rajguru, Sairat (2016)
- Currently held by: Kalyanee Mulay, Nude (2018)

Maharashtracha Favourite Kon? Award for Favourite Actress is given by Zee Talkies as part of its annual Maharashtracha Favourite Kon? ceremony for Marathi films.

Although the MFK Awards started in 2009, awards for the best debut actor category started in 2015. In 2015 and 2016, both the female and male debut competed for a single award, after which separate categories were created for female and male debut actors.

== Winners and nominees ==
Year	Photos of winners	Actor	Role(s)	Film	Ref.
2016		Rinku Rajguru †	Archana (Archi) Patil	Sairat	
2016		Mitali Mayekar	Amruta	Urfi	
2016		Kritika Deo	Shweta Vidyadhar Rajwade	Rajwade & Sons	
2017		Aarya Ambekar †	Tanvi	Ti Saddhya Kay Karte	
2017		Mithila Palkar	Indu	Muramba	
2017		Rucha Inamdar	Madhu	Bhikari	
2018		Kalyanee Mulay †	Yamuna	Nude	
