= Pavsacha Nibandh =

- Official poster
- Directed by: Nagraj Manjule
- Written by: Nagraj Manjule
- Produced by: Balkrishna Manjule; Sheshraj Manjule; Gargee Kulkarni; Nagraj Manjule
- Starring: Meghraj Shinde; Gargee Kulkarni; Sheshraj Manjule; Rahi Manjule
- Cinematography: Sudhakar Reddy Yakkanti
- Edited by: Kutub Inamdar
- Music by: Avinash Sonwane
- Production company: Aatpat Production
- Distributed by: ZEE5
- Release dates: 13 April 2018 (IFFLA); 15 July 2020 (India)
- Running time: 25 minutes
- Country: India
- Language: Marathi
- Budget: est.₹35–40 lakh

Pavsacha Nibandh (transl. An Essay Of The Rain) is an Indian Marathi-language short film directed by Nagraj Manjule. It is produced by Balkrishna Manjule, Sheshraj Manjule, and Gargee Kulkarni. The film won the Best Director in Non-Feature Film and Best Audiography in Non-feature Film categories at the 65th National Film Awards in 2018. It depicts the challenges faced by the child's mother as she endeavors to bring her intoxicated husband back home.

The film was premiered at the National Film Archive of India in Pune on 2 September 2018. It was released on 15 July 2020 and available for streaming on ZEE5.

== Plot ==
A small boy is given a school assignment to write an essay on monsoons and all its numerous rewards. On his way back to his thatched-roof house at one end of this small village in the Western Ghats, he runs into his father lying drunk on the road. There, is seen his family struggle to get through this day, despite him having to finish his essay in time for school the next day.

== Cast ==
- Meghraj Shinde as Raja
- Gargee Kulkarni as Mangal
- Sheshraj Manjule Raja's father
- Rahi Manjule as Pari

== Production ==
=== Development ===
Pavsacha Nibandh is a Majule's second short film, following Pistulya, commenced production in 2017 and wrapped up post-production in 2018.

=== Filming ===
Pavsacha Nibandh was filmed over seven and a half days in Pavana and Mulshi of Pune district in Maharashtra, along with some spots in the Western Ghats. Several scenes were filmed in villages within a 40 km range. While artificial showers are utilized by some, the majority of on-screen rainfall is authentic.

== Release ==
Pavsacha Nibandh was released on ZEE5 on 15 July 2020.

== Reception ==
Anupam Kant Verma of Firstpost praised Nagraj Manjule's directing skills, highlighting his ability to bring out compelling performances from the actors and extract drama from everyday moments. Specifically appreciate how Manjule uses sound, such as the sound of leaking water, to enhance the storytelling and create atmosphere. Overall, the reviewer is impressed by Manjule's attention to detail, particularly in sound design, which adds depth and life to the film.

Rahul Desai of Film Companion praised the film for its visually stunning portrayal of rural life, akin to the aesthetic of a monsoon chai, while also highlighting its subversion of cultural perceptions. He appreciate how the director uses genre conventions to deliver unexpected narratives, comparing it to the technique employed in the film Sairat.

== Awards ==
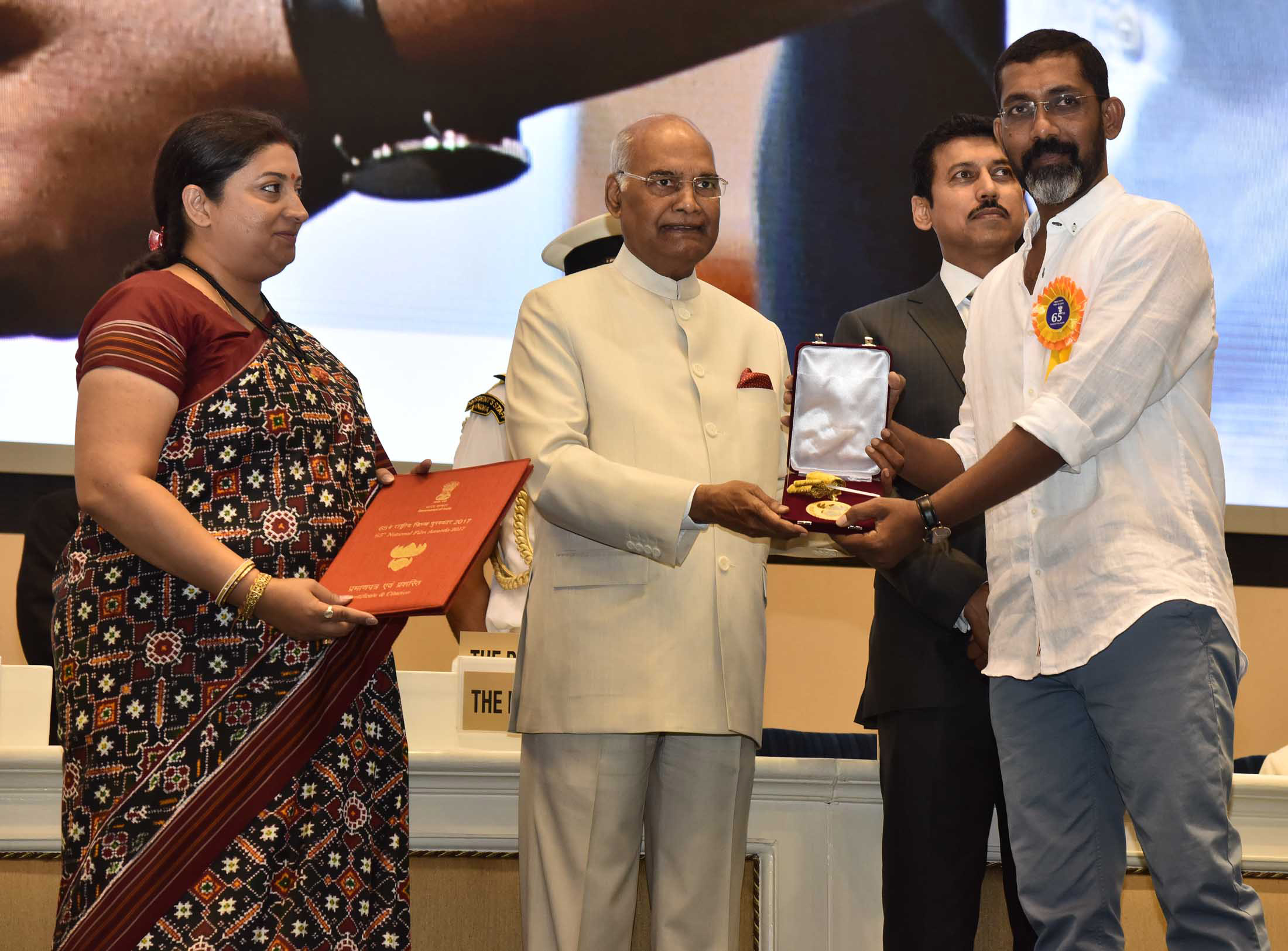
Former president Ram Nath Kovind (middle) presenting the Swarna Kamal Award to Nagraj Manjule (right) (Best Direction) for the film at the 65th National Film Awards, in New Delhi.

Year	Award	Category	Nominee	Result	Ref(s)
2018	65th National Film Awards	Best Director in Non-Feature Film	Nagraj Manjule	Won	
2018	65th National Film Awards	Best Audiography	Avinash Sonwane	Won	
2018	Indian Film Festival of Los Angeles	Audience Award for Best Short Film	Pavsacha Nibandh	Won	
