= Kal: Yesterday and Tomorrow =

- Directed by: Ruchi Narain
- Written by: Ruchi Narain
- Produced by: Sudhir Mishra
- Starring: Chitrangda Singh; Ram Kapoor; Shiney Ahuja
- Cinematography: Prakash Kutty
- Edited by: Ranjeet Bahadur
- Music by: Shantanu Moitra; Sneha Khanwalkar
- Release date: 16 September 2005
- Running time: 131 minutes
- Country: India
- Language: Hindi
- Budget: ₹1 crore
- Box office: est.₹35 lakh

Kal: Yesterday and Tomorrow is a 2005 Indian Hindi-language drama-thriller film written and directed by Ruchi Narain. Produced by Sudhir Mishra under Sudhir Mishra Productions, the film features an ensemble cast of Chitrangda Singh, Shiney Ahuja, Smriti Mishra, Ram Kapoor, Malaika Shenoy, Sarika and Boman Irani. Shantanu Moitra composed the soundtrack and Sneha Khanwalkar composed the title track and the background score. Prakash Kutty and Ranjeet Bahadur handled the cinematography and editing respectively. The film was premiered at 7th Osian's Cinefan Festival of Asian and Arab Cinema in July 2005. It was theatrically released on 16 September 2005.

== Plot ==
Bhavna Dayal and Maya Jalan had been fellow collegians and close friends, both come from very wealthy families. Bhavna is in love with another ex-fellow collegian, Tarun Haksar, who also comes from a wealthy family, and is also in love with Bhavna. Their respective families' expect both to marry each other. However, Tarun and Maya suddenly announce their engagement, and get married, leaving a shocked and heart-broken Bhavna to deal with this situation on her own. She eventually breaks off all contact with her former lover and friend respectively. One night, several months later, a disturbed Tarun returns to her life and apartment, and stays there overnight. The next day she is shocked to find out that Maya has been shot dead, and the police suspect Tarun of killing her. The question remains if Tarun had spent the entire night with Bhavna, then who killed Maya, and further why did Tarun decide to return to Bhavna's life all of a sudden?

== Cast ==
- Chitrangada Singh as Bhavana Dayal
- Shiney Ahuja as Tarun Haksar
- Smriti Mishra as Maya Jalan
- Ram Kapoor as Rohan Sehgal
- Murad Ali as Teji Rathore
- Malaika Shenoy as Sangeeta Nair
- Sarika as Ira Haksar
- Boman Irani as Yashwant Dayal
- Saurabh Shukla as Rajesh Jalan
- Deepak Qazir as Lakshmi Narayan Jalan
- Nazanin Boniadi as Simmi
- Vivek Madan as Anju Jalan
- Gopi Desai as Sajida Dayal
- Arbaaz Ali Khan as Sameer Dayal
- Murali Sharma as Shekhar
- Yusuf Hussein as Madan Haksar

== Reception ==
Taran Adarsh writing for Bollywood Hungama gave 1 out of 5 stars stating, "Ruchi has a different style of narrating a story, but cinema such as KAL - YESTERDAY & TOMORROW is not everybody's cup of tea. It gets too complicated as it unfolds!".
