= Hanuman: Da' Damdaar =

- Theatrical release poster
- Directed by: Ruchi Narain
- Written by: Ruchi Narain
- Produced by: R.A.T Films; Ashustosh Shah; Taher Shabbir; Ruchi Narain
- Starring: Salman Khan; Javed Akhtar; Raveena Tandon; Vinay Pathak; Makrand Deshpande; Saurabh Shukla; Chunky Pandey; Kunal Khemu; Sneha Khanwalkar; Hussain Dalal; Prasad Barve; Rajesh Kava
- Music by: Sneha Khanwalkar
- Production companies: R.A.T Films (IP: Percept Pictures)
- Release date: 2 June 2017
- Country: India
- Language: Hindi
- Box office: ₹2 crore

Hanuman: Da’ Damdaar (transl. Hanuman, the powerful) is a 2017 Indian mythological-adventure animated film, directed by Ruchi Narain, presented by RNB Films in association with R.A.T Films. It is a story of a boy, Hanuman set in 'mythological' times. The concept of the film is for children to have fun and learn something. Salman Khan unveiled the motion poster of the film on the occasion of Hanuman Jayanti on 11 April 2017. The film was released on 2 June 2017. Film Editor Hemanshu Rathod

== Voice cast ==
- Salman Khan as Hanuman
- Arnav Nathani as Maruti
- Hussain Dalal as Garuda
- Raveena Tandon as Anjani
- Saurabh Shukla as Kesari
- Javed Akhtar as Maharishi Valmiki
- Kunal Khemu as Indra
- Viraf Patel as Vishnu
- Makarand Deshpande as Vishrava
- Rajesh Kava as Narad
- Chunky Pandey as Naazuk Tourist Guide
- Vinay Pathak as Popat Sharma
- Sneha Khanwalkar as Seeti
- Prasad Barve as Pig 1, Pig 3, Chotu

== Plot ==
Anjani has not forgotten how her son almost lost his life. Now to protect him, she shelters him in a bid to keep him from harming himself again. She doesn't even allow him to go out of the house.

When his father Senapati Kesari returns from war, he is upset to find that his brave son has become a scared little boy.

Maruti feels bad that his father isn't proud of him, and prays to God to make him the 'bravest kid in the world'.

God answers his prayers and leads Maruti into a series of jungle adventures. His experiences and new friends lead him to metamorphose from a 'Bhola-Bhala Bajrangi' to... HANUMAN DA' DAMDAAR!!

== Music ==
The music for film is composed by Sneha Khanwalkar and lyrics are penned by Abhishek Dubey. The background score is given by Shruti Kumar-Jessica Weiss and Bapi-Tutul. The soundtrack album is released by T-Series. The song "Lakdi Ki Kaathi" is a recreated version of the original song from the 1983 film Masoom which was originally composed by R. D. Burman and written by Gulzar. The music for recreated version is given by Abhishek Arora with additional lyrics by Abhishek Dubey.

All music is composed by Sneha Khanwalkar.

No.	Title	Singer(s)	Length
1.	"Bhai O Bhai"	Saagar Kendurkar	4:24
2.	"Hanuman Chalisa"	Sneha Pandit, Taher Shabbir	5:01
3.	"The Maa Song"	Swanand Kirkire, Meenal Jain	4:02
4.	"Lakdi Ki Kaathi (Recreated)"	Rashi Salil Harmalkar, Vea Kumar, Arhaan Hussain	2:39

== See also ==
- List of Indian animated feature films
