= Aathva Rang Premacha =

2022 Marathi film

- Theatrical release poster
- Directed by: Khushboo Sinha
- Written by: Samir Karnik; Khushboo Sinha
- Produced by: Samir Karnik; Rakesh Raut; Ashish Bhalerao
- Starring: Rinku Rajguru; Makarand Deshpande; Vishal Aanand
- Cinematography: Duleep Regmi
- Edited by: Sumit Dhole
- Music by: Prini Siddhant Madhav; Marc D Muse
- Production companies: Adinath Pictures; Rakesh Raut Production; Top Angle Productions
- Distributed by: AA Films
- Release date: 17 June 2022
- Country: India
- Language: Marathi

Aathva Rang Premacha is a 2022 Indian Marathi-language romantic drama film directed by Khushboo Sinha in her directorial debut, starring Rinku Rajguru in the leading role. It is produced by Adinath Pictures, Rakesh Raut Production and Top Angle Productions.

== Cast ==
- Rinku Rajguru as Krutika
- Vishal Aanand
- Makarand Deshpande Krutika's father
- Anshuman Ram Tripathi as Albert
- Aditi Patil as Aditi
- Kanchan Jadhav as Raj Laxmi
- Tushar Kawale as Amey
- Digvijay Rohidas as Patil
- Divya Sinha
- Ashish Warang as Waghmare

== Release ==
The film was theatrically released on 17 June 2022.

== Reception ==
=== Critical reception ===
A reviewer from The Times of India rated three stars out of five stars said 'Aathva Rang Premacha' has a great plot, backed by some solid performances.

A reviewer from Lokmat wrote, "Even if a closeted lover in the society refrains from committing an acid attack after watching this film, the effort will be worth it. Therefore, one should watch this movie at least once, ignoring the errors and shortcomings."
