= Kutub Inamdar =

Indian film editor

- Occupations: Film editor; cinematographer
- Years active: 2009–present
- Notable work: Pistulya (2009); Sairat (2016); Jhund (2022)

Kutub Inamdar is an Indian film editor and cinematographer mostly edited Marathi films. He is best known for Sairat (2016), Jhund (2022), Ghar Banduk Biryani (2023). He was nominated for Best Editing at the 3rd Filmfare Awards Marathi for Sairat.

== Career ==
Kutub Inamdar began his career in 2009 with a short film, Pistulya, his first collaboration with Nagraj Manjule before Sairat.

In 2022 Kutub Inamdar was the editor of the miniseries Unpaused: Naya Safar (a sequel to Unpaused). Nandini Ramnath of Scroll.in stated "Writers Manjule and Sudhir Kulkarni, cinematographer Harshvardhan Waghdhare and editor Kutub Inamdar build up a hypnotic rhythm before opening out the story to Vikas’s worst fears."

== Filmography ==
Key
†	Denotes films that have not yet been released

Year	Film	Notes	Ref(s)
2009	Pistulya	short film; also cinematoghrapher	
2016	Sairat		
2016	Paywat: The Road Less Travelled	short film; cinematographer	
2017	Pimpal		
2020	Pavsacha Nibandh	short film	
2022	Jhund	Hindi film	
2022	Unpaused Naya Safar	Miniseries	
2023	Ghar Banduk Biryani	Released in Marathi, Hindi, Tamil and Telugu	
2026	Frame		
2027	Khashaba †		

== Accolades ==
Year	Award	Category	Nominated work	Result	Ref(s)
2015	Filmfare Awards Marathi	Best Editing	Sairat	Nominated	
