= Hundred (TV series) =

Indian web series streaming on Hotstar

- Promotional poster
- Genre: Action comedy
- Created by: Ruchi Narain; Ashutosh Shah; Taher Shabbir; Abhishek Dubey
- Written by: Abhishek Dubey; Ruchi Narain; Ashutosh Shah
- Directed by: Ruchi Narain; Ashutosh Shah; Taher Shabbir
- Starring: Lara Dutta; Rinku Rajguru; Karan Wahi; Sudhanshu Pandey; Parmeet Sethi; Makarand Deshpande; Arun Nalawade
- Composer: The Salvage Audio Collective
- Country of origin: India
- Original language: Hindi
- No. of seasons: 1
- No. of episodes: 8

Production
- Producers: Ruchi Narain; Ashutosh Shah; Taher Shabbir; Neelesh Bhatnagar
- Production location: India
- Cinematography: Volker Schellbach
- Editor: Tushar Parekh
- Running time: 31-46.5 min
- Production company: R.A.T. Films

Original release
- Network: Hotstar
- Release: 25 April 2020

Hundred is an Indian action comedy series starring Lara Dutta and Rinku Rajguru in lead roles which is directed by Ruchi Narain, Ashutosh Shah and Taher Shabbir streaming from April 25, 2020 on Hotstar's label Hotstar Specials.

== Premise ==
Netra Patil (Rinku Rajguru) learns that she has only hundred days left to live because of her terminal illness meets an ambitious ACP Saumya Shukla (Lara Dutta) and becomes an undercover agent. The duo tries to accomplish their goals in the next hundred days. The series contains suspense, emotional rollercoasters, action scenes, and subtle comedy too.

== Cast ==
- Lara Dutta as Soumya Shukla, the ambitious ACP who wants to be like James Bond but ends up being treated as "Downgraded Cop" by her department.
- Rinku Rajguru as Netra Patil, a woman with many dreams who was forced to re-evaluate her life, as she found out that she can only live for one hundred days.
- Karan Wahi as Manohar Dahiya alias Maddy
- Sudhanshu Pandey as Pravin Shukla, Soumya's husband
- Parmeet Sethi as Anshuman Goswami
- Rajeev Siddhartha as Shantanu Jha
- Jayant Gadekar as Diwakar Asole
- Rohini Hattangadi
- Makarand Deshpande as Satyendra Ahir alias Sattu Uncle
- Arun Nalawade
- Taher Shabbir
- Suyash Zunjurke
- Sushil Kumar as Sumit

== Episodes ==
No.	Title	Directed by	Written by	Original release date
1	"Ab Judge Karo Mujhe"	Ruchi Narain; Ashutosh Shah; Taher Shabbir	Abhishek Dubey; Ruchi Narain; Ashutosh Shah	April 25, 2020
Netra a small time Government employee who wants to travel to Switzerland. On the other hand, Saumya ACP is persistently taken of the cases she is working in favour of making her department's face for women who is married to DCP of Narcotics and cheating with Maddy.Netra gets to know she has stage four brain tumor and has just 100 days left for her and goes to bar as she was not able Convey that to her family. Waiter mistakes Netra for a girl with drug racket calls Saumya. Saumya stops a small mishap by Netra with a taxi driver and gives her lift and learns of her cancer. Saumya tells her to live hee life on her own terms. Netra leaves her family behind and reaches Saumya's house where Maddy is living.
2	"Hawa Hawai"	Ruchi Narain; Ashutosh Shah; Taher Shabbir	Abhishek Dubey; Ruchi Narain; Ashutosh Shah	April 25, 2020
3	"Chance Pe Dance"	Ruchi Narain; Ashutosh Shah; Taher Shabbir	Abhishek Dubey; Ruchi Narain; Ashutosh Shah	April 25, 2020
4	"Meri Blacklist"	Ruchi Narain; Ashutosh Shah; Taher Shabbir	Abhishek Dubey; Ruchi Narain; Ashutosh Shah	April 25, 2020
5	"Disco Deewane"	Ruchi Narain; Ashutosh Shah; Taher Shabbir	Abhishek Dubey; Ruchi Narain; Ashutosh Shah	April 25, 2020
6	"Chor Aur Chowkidaar"	Ruchi Narain; Ashutosh Shah; Taher Shabbir	Abhishek Dubey; Ruchi Narain; Ashutosh Shah	April 25, 2020
7	"Main Bhi Item Girl"	Ruchi Narain; Ashutosh Shah; Taher Shabbir	Abhishek Dubey; Ruchi Narain; Ashutosh Shah	April 25, 2020
8	"Khel Khiladi Ka"	Ruchi Narain; Ashutosh Shah; Taher Shabbir	Abhishek Dubey; Ruchi Narain; Ashutosh Shah	April 25, 2020

== Production ==
The series was filmed in location and around Mumbai. Dutta expressed she chose the part because she hasn't portrayed cop in her career and Rajguru debuting in webspace expressed that she chose the part as bindaas Marathi mulgi in which she came to portray something different in each episode.

== Release ==
The series was released on April 25, 2020 by Hotstar on its label Hotstar Specials.

=== Promotion ===
The first look and the trailer were released on April 21, 2020, revealing the release date by Hotstar.

== Reception ==
Divyanshi Sharma, in her review for India Today, said that "In all, despite a few hiccups, the show is an entertaining ride and deserves to be on your watch-list this weekend". Nandini Ramnath writing for, Scroll.in, said that "the show belongs to Lara and Rinku despite of its flaws". Saibal Chatterjee writing for NDTV said that "Lara Dutta and Rinku Rajguru hold Hundred together with consistent performances. Rajguru is full of beans, Dutta is steady and sedate.", giving 2.5 out of 5 stars.
