= Chup: Revenge of the Artist =

2022 Indian film by R. Balki

Chup
- Theatrical release poster
- Directed by: R. Balki
- Screenplay by: R. Balki; Raja Sen; Rishi Virmani
- Story by: R. Balki
- Produced by: Rakesh Jhunjhunwala; Anil Naidu; Jayantilal Gada; Gauri Shinde
- Starring: Sunny Deol; Dulquer Salmaan; Shreya Dhanwanthary; Pooja Bhatt
- Cinematography: Vishal Sinha
- Edited by: Nayan Bhadra
- Music by: Score: Aman Pant; Songs: Amit Trivedi; Sneha Khanwalkar; S. D. Burman
- Production companies: Pen Studios; Hope Productions
- Distributed by: Pen Marudhar Cine Entertainment
- Release date: 23 September 2022
- Running time: 135 minutes
- Country: India
- Language: Hindi
- Budget: ₹10 crore
- Box office: ₹13 crore

Chup: Revenge of the Artist is a 2022 Indian Hindi-language crime thriller film written and directed by R. Balki. The film stars Sunny Deol, Dulquer Salmaan, Shreya Dhanwanthary and Pooja Bhatt. Set in Mumbai, the film focuses on a serial killer targeting corrupt film critics and a police officer assigned to catch the killer. Chup was released on 23 September 2022 to highly positive reviews from critics and was a modest success at the box office.

== Plot ==
In Mumbai, a film critic named Nitin Srivatsav is found dead at his residence. An IPS officer, IGP Arvind Mathur, is assigned to investigate the case. Arvind deduces that the killer mutilated Nitin's body with a surgical knife and drew a symbol on his forehead, which he is unable to decipher.

Danny is a florist who meets Nila Menon, an entertainment reporter, and the two fall for each other. A few days later, another film critic, Irshaad Ali, is also found dead with his body being crushed under a train. Meanwhile, Danny and Nila grow close. Danny surprises her on her birthday, which happens to fall on the same day as the birth anniversary of famous actor and director Guru Dutt. He gifts her "Kaagaz Ke Phool" (Flowers made of paper). After a week, another film critic, Parikshit Prabhu, is found dead in a cricket stadium with his body parts and organs removed and scattered around. Arvind deduces that the killer reads the reviews written by the critics and targets only those who give negative reviews to films.

Arvind summons all the major film critics in Mumbai and ask them to cooperate in their investigation, but they refuse, fearing for their lives. The next day, another critic, Govind Pandey, is found dead and it is revealed (to the audience) that the killer was none other than Danny. Pandey had given a positive review to a mediocre film, as the film's makers had paid him money to do so. Danny brutally killed him, mutilating his body and painting the walls with his blood. After this, Arvind is allotted a two-week deadline to solve the case. For assistance, he consults the criminal psychologist, Zenobia Shroff, a close friend since their college days. Zenobia suggests that the killer might have a connection with the film industry.

Arvind soon checks the list of film directors, who retired after their films were panned by film critics and tanked at the box office, where they learn about Guru Dutt, whose last film Kaagaz Ke Phool was panned by critics. Realizing that the killer is connected to Guru Dutt, Arvind decides to catch him by asking some critics to post their reviews in the same way like the previous critics, but they all refuse. Nila is asked to review a newly released film, to which she reluctantly agrees. Later, Danny reads Nila's review and, finding it dishonest and uninformed, gets enraged. Danny kidnaps Nila. Arvind arrives just as Danny is about to murder Nila, saving her, and subsequently subdues and arrests Danny.

Later, the police finds a cassette named Chup and finds that the film is actually Danny's biopic. Danny's real name was Sebastian Gomes, and he was a fan of Guru Dutt since childhood. Sebastian's father used to physically abuse his mother and had killed his dog, also named Danny. Having grown up, Sebastian punished his father, by locking him inside the room, killing him, and later, his mother died as well. After this, Sebastian wrote and directed the film Chup, which was panned by critics, which led Sebastian to become mentally scarred and he becomes a serial killer, punishing the critics who give dishonest reviews to films. Chup later gets recognition and is regarded as a masterpiece just like Kaagaz Ke Phool.

== Cast ==
- Sunny Deol as IGP Arvind Mathur - An IPS officer
- Dulquer Salmaan as Sebastian Gomes / Danny - A florist, Nila's boyfriend
- Shreya Dhanwanthary as Nila Menon – An entertainment reporter, Danny's girlfriend
- Pooja Bhatt as Dr. Zenobia Shroff – A criminal psychologist, Arvind's close friend
- Saranya Ponvannan as Nila's mother
- Amitabh Bachchan (cameo appearance) as Amit
- Rajeev Ravindranathan as DCP Srinivas Shetty
- Adhyayan Suman as Purab Kapoor
- Raja Sen as Senior Critic
- Dhruv Hiena Lohumi as Kartik
- Bipin Nadakarni DGP of Crime Branch
- Zahir Mirza as Nikhil
- Rea Malhotra Mukhtyar as Richa
- Pravishi Das as Reshma nandu
- Priyanka Karekar as Danny's mother
- Pyarali Nayani as Nitin Srivastav – A film critic
- Veenu Khatri as Nitin Srivastav's wife
- Dhanesh Dogra as Parikshit Prabhu
- Amit Chakravarthy as Irshaad Ali
- Nilesh Ranade as Govind Pandey
- Chandrakant Parulekar as Kaleem Bhai
- Abeer Jain as Kinu Malhotra
- Prajakta Parab as the mother (featured in the film Chup)

== Production ==
In July 2021, R. Balki confirmed he would be directing a film based on Guru Dutt and his tragic film career, to be produced again by Hope Production. The project is produced by Rakesh Jhunjhunwala, Jayantilal Gada and Gauri Shinde. Filmmaker R. Balki said that Guru Dutt was the perfect reference point for Chup: Revenge of the Artist, his thriller which depicts the pain of an artist who suffers from "wrong criticism" which happened with Guru Dutt in real time. A teaser of Chup unveiled over the weekend to mark Dutt's 97th birth anniversary, pays homage to the late director's film Kaagaz Ke Phool.

== Music and soundtrack ==
Chup: Revenge of the Artist (Original Motion Picture Soundtrack)

Soundtrack album by Amit Trivedi, Sneha Khanwalkar and S. D. Burman
- Released: 15 September 2022
- Recorded: 2022
- Genres: Motion Picture Soundtrack, Filmi
- Length: 13:45
- Language: Hindi
- Label: Saregama Music

The music for the film's songs was composed and recreated by Amit Trivedi and Sneha Khanwalkar, over the original music previously composed for a couple of songs by S. D. Burman. The lyrics of the songs were written by Swanand Kirkire and a couple of old songs were used whose lyrics were previously penned by Sahir Ludhianvi.

The background score of the movie was done by Aman Pant.

No.	Title	Lyrics	Music	Singer(s)	Length
1.	"Mera Love Main"	Swanand Kirkire	Amit Trivedi	Amit Trivedi	3:29
2.	"Gaya Gaya Gaya"	Swanand Kirkire	Amit Trivedi	Rupali Moghe, Shashwat Singh	4:05
3.	"Ye Duniya Agar Mil Bhi Jaye"	Sahir Ludhianvi	S. D. Burman, Sneha Khanwalkar (recreation)	Sneha Shankar	6:11
Total length:					13:45

== Release ==
Chup: Revenge of the Artist was released on 23 September 2022. The streaming rights of the film were acquired by ZEE5. The film was digitally released on 25 November 2022.

== Reception ==
=== Critical response ===
On the review aggregator website Rotten Tomatoes, 40% of 15 critics' reviews are positive, with an average rating of 5.5/10.

==== India ====
Roktim Rajpal of India Today rated the film 3.5 out of 5 stars and wrote, "Chup is a highly watchable and layered thriller that may 'silence' its critics, courtesy of its refreshing concept. It is Sunny Deol who proves to be the scene stealer here. The veteran actor delivers a beautifully restrained performance. He packs a punch without even flexing his muscles. The natural intensity that he brings to the table in Chup may remind one of his work in the underrated Ghayal 2". Ronak Kotecha of The Times of India rated the film 3 out of 5 stars and wrote, "Even though the story maintains the suspense behind the invisible entity until the end, it neither surprises nor shocks when it unfolds. The songs are easily forgettable, though the background music is still okay". Avinash Lohana of Pinkvilla rated the film 3 out of 5 stars and wrote, "R Balki's Chup: Revenge of the Artist is a unique film, but is not critic proof". Sukanya Verma of Rediff rated the film 3 out of 5 stars and wrote, "Chup's bias is reserved for disgruntled creators at the receiving end of nasty appraisals of their efforts". She also pointed out that the story of Chup is quite like the British film Theatre of Blood. Bollywood Hungama rated the film 3 out of 5 stars and wrote, "CHUP is a unique tale of a serial killer that boasts of some fine performances". Stutee Ghosh of The Quint rated the film 2.5 out of 5 stars and wrote, "Chup remains an interesting, intriguing idea that couldn't quite execute what it ambitiously set out to achieve".

Anna M. M. Vetticad of Firstpost rated the film 2.5 out of 5 stars and wrote, "Chup's story of a serial killer who targets critics is spun into a tribute to Guru Dutt. The idea is interesting but the film fails to grasp the essence of the late legend's magic". Shubhra Gupta of The Indian Express rated the film 2 out of 5 stars and wrote, "This film, about dream-makers and those who destroy those dreams, is less satisfactory than it should have been". Saibal Chatterjee of NDTV rated the film 2 out of 5 stars and wrote that Chup was "a muddle but certainly not of monumental proportions. That it ventures into uncharted territory is undeniably commendable. But it needed something more to be elevate itself above a mere idiosyncratic concept". Bohni Bandyopadhyay of News 18 rated the film 2 out of 5 stars and wrote, "Chup works in parts thanks to the premise and some taut moments of suspense. The rich texture, wonderful use of real locations, and flavourful camerawork help the plot appear more mythic than it actually is".'Chup' is a one-time watchable film that has an intriguing yet crisp storyline, except for a few predictable sequences says Onmanorama.

==== International ====
Phil Houd of The Guardian rated the film 4 out of 5 stars and wrote that "Chup successfully skewers not just the tense film-maker/critic relationship, but knows perfectly where to put its finger to best needle Film Twitter: it calls out hot-take merchants, overly positive and corrupt reviewers, and this exalted calling's self-importance...it's a caustic and tasty film for the most part." Manjusha Radhakrishnan of Gulf News rated the film 3 out of 5 stars and wrote, "R Balki shines the spotlight on a dark and twisted mind in his sobering thriller Chup.

=== Box office ===
Chup: Revenge of the Artist earned ₹3.06 crores at the domestic box office on its opening day. On the second day, the film collected ₹2.07 crore. On the third day, the film collected ₹2.25 crore. The film collected ₹13 crore as its worldwide in its lifetime.
