= Jeur =

Village in Maharashtra

Jeur जेऊर
- village
- Location in Maharashtra, India Jeur (India)
- Coordinates: 18.25°N 75.15°E
- INDIA: KARMALA India
- State: MAHARASHTRA Maharashtra
- District: Solapur district
- Sub District Headquarters: Karmala Taluka

Government
  - Type: Gram Panchayat
  - Body: Panchayat

Area 66
  - Total: 11.09 km^{2} (4.28 sq mi)
  - Rank: 57th:Karmala Taluka
- Elevation: 552 m (1,811 ft)

Population (2025)
  - Total: AROUND 15 THOUSAND
  - Rank: 2nd:Karmala Taluka
  - Density: 620/km^{2} (1,600/sq mi)
- Demonym: Jeurkar

Languages
  - Official: Marathi
- Time zone: UTC+5:30 (IST)
- PIN: 413202
- Vehicle registration: MH 45
- Literacy Rate: 86%
- Nearest city: Karmala

Jeur is a village in the Karmala taluka of Solapur district in Maharashtra state, India.

Sairat, the controversial and highest-grossing Marathi film of all time based on the theme of forbidden love based on caste hierarchy was set and shot in Jeur village.

== Climate ==
Climate data for Jeur (1991–2020)
Month	Jan	Feb	Mar	Apr	May	Jun	Jul	Aug	Sep	Oct	Nov	Dec	Year
Record high °C (°F)	37.4 (99.3)	40.1 (104.2)	42.9 (109.2)	46.4 (115.5)	46.6 (115.9)	44.6 (112.3)	42.1 (107.8)	40.5 (104.9)	38.6 (101.5)	38.2 (100.8)	35.8 (96.4)	35.4 (95.7)	46.6 (115.9)
Mean daily maximum °C (°F)	31.8 (89.2)	34.4 (93.9)	38.8 (101.8)	41.6 (106.9)	41.0 (105.8)	36.0 (96.8)	32.4 (90.3)	31.6 (88.9)	32.8 (91.0)	33.4 (92.1)	32.5 (90.5)	31.0 (87.8)	35.0 (95.0)
Mean daily minimum °C (°F)	12.0 (53.6)	13.2 (55.8)	16.9 (62.4)	20.4 (68.7)	21.3 (70.3)	19.7 (67.5)	18.8 (65.8)	17.7 (63.9)	17.6 (63.7)	15.4 (59.7)	14.3 (57.7)	11.0 (51.8)	16.6 (61.9)
Record low °C (°F)	2.2 (36.0)	5.0 (41.0)	10.1 (50.2)	9.0 (48.2)	12.0 (53.6)	10.6 (51.1)	10.1 (50.2)	10.1 (50.2)	10.0 (50.0)	9.1 (48.4)	4.8 (40.6)	4.2 (39.6)	2.2 (36.0)
Source: India Meteorological Department

== Demographics ==
Covering 1,109 hectares (2,740 acres) and comprising 1491 households at the time of the 2011 census of India, Jeur had a population of 6880. There were 3602 males and 3278 females, with 818 people being aged six or younger.

== Notable people ==
- Award-winning Marathi movie director, and actor Nagraj Manjule was born and brought up in Jeur
