= Zingaat =

Indian Marathi-language song by Ajay-Atul

- Official song cover

Single by Ajay-Atul

from the album Sairat
- Language: Marathi
- Released: April 14, 2016
- Studio: Sony Scoring Stage, Culver City, California
- Length: 3:52
- Label: Zee Music Company
- Songwriter: Ajay-Atul
- Composer: Ajay-Atul
- Producer: Ajay-Atul

Music video
- Zingaat on YouTube

"Zingaat" is an Indian Marathi-language song from the 2016 film Sairat, directed by Nagraj Manjule. Composed and written by the musical duo Ajay-Atul, the song became a cultural phenomenon in India, known for its high-energy beats and catchy rhythm. It is performed by Ajay Gogavale and Atul Gogavale and has garnered over 450 million views on YouTube as of June 2021, making it the most-watched Marathi song on the platform at that time. The song's popularity led to its adaptation in other Indian languages, including Hindi for the 2018 film Dhadak and Kannada for the 2017 film Manasu Mallige.

== Production ==
"Zingaat" was recorded at the Sony Scoring Stage in Culver City, California, featuring an orchestra of 66 musicians. The production included a 45-piece string section, a 13-piece brass section, six woodwind instruments, a six-piece horn section, three trumpets, three trombones, a tuba, and a harp, conducted by Mark Graham. According to The Times of India, no choreographer was assigned, and the actors, including Akash Thosar and Rinku Rajguru, were encouraged to dance freely as they would to an energetic track, resulting in a raw and authentic performance.

== Lyrics and themes ==
The lyrics of "Zingaat," written by Ajay-Atul, celebrate the exuberance of young love and carefree joy. Nandini Ramnath of Scroll.in described the song as "one of the greatest earworms ever composed," noting its "difficult-to-translate lyrics that speak of the raucous joys of young love" and its fusion of traditional drums with a brass section. The Marathi lyrics, such as "Urat hoti dhad dhad lali galavar ali" and "Jhalay zing zing zing zing zing zing zingat," are playful and rhythmic, enhancing the song’s danceability.

== Reception ==
Upon its release, "Zingaat" became a nationwide sensation, played at festivals, weddings, and social gatherings across India. Mihir Bhanage of The Times of India praised its catchy tune, stating, "High on beats, this catchy tune is impossible to stop humming and it's sure to be a hit on the dance floor soon enough."

As of June 2021, the official music video for "Zingaat" had amassed over 450 million views on YouTube.

== Accolades ==
Award	Category	Recipient(s) and nominee(s)	Result	Ref.
Filmfare Awards Marathi	Best Playback Singer – Male	Ajay–Atul	Nominated	
Filmfare Awards Marathi	Best Choreography	Nagraj Manjule	Nominated	

== Adaptations ==
=== Hindi version (Dhadak, 2018) ===
The Hindi remake of Sairat, titled Dhadak and directed by Shashank Khaitan, featured a version of "Zingaat" with lyrics by Amitabh Bhattacharya. Performed by Ajay Gogavale and Atul Gogavale, the song was released on June 27, 2018, and choreographed by Farah Khan. However, some fans felt the Hindi version lacked the "desi flavor" of the original Marathi track.

=== Kannada version (Manasu Mallige, 2017) ===
The song was adapted for the Kannada remake of Sairat, titled Manasu Mallige. Retitled "Ayyayyappo," it was composed by Ajay-Atul with lyrics by Yogaraj Bhat.
