= Thugs of Hindostan (soundtrack) =

Soundtrack album by Ajay–Atul
- Released: 25 October 2018
- Recorded: 2017–2018
- Genre: Feature film soundtrack
- Length: 15:36
- Language: Hindi
- Label: YRF Music
- Producer: Ajay–Atul

Ajay–Atul chronology
Dhadak (2018)	Thugs of Hindostan (2018)	Zero (2018)
External audio
- Audio Jukebox on YouTube

Thugs of Hindostan is the soundtrack album to the 2018 film of the same name directed by Vijay Krishna Acharya and produced by Aditya Chopra for Yash Raj Films starring Amitabh Bachchan, Aamir Khan, Katrina Kaif and Fatima Sana Shaikh. The soundtrack featured four songs composed by Ajay–Atul, with lyrics by Amitabh Bhattacharya. The soundtrack was released under the YRF Music label on 25 October 2018.

== Background ==
In late 2016, the trio Shankar–Ehsaan–Loy was brought on board to compose music for the film. But the team opted out of the project, a year later, due to scheduling conflicts and script changes, resulting in the demand of newer songs. Shankar Mahadevan added "It was a never-ending schedule with the film, and they were increasing it [even further]. First they said [that] the shooting would be for six months. Then, they made some changes in the script, and then they increased it to a year, and then a year and a half. We couldn’t afford to take out that much time for it." As the trio were also working on the music of Manikarnika: The Queen of Jhansi (2019), they felt it difficult to handle two high-profile projects simultaneously, resulting in their exit from the project. They recommended Ajay–Atul's name to the producers and Aamir, as the composers had a highly successful career post Sairat (2016) and has been a part of high-profile projects, including Shah Rukh Khan's Zero (2018). The duo then composed four songs for the film, written by Amitabh Bhattacharya. John Stewart Eduri composed the film score.

== Release ==
The first song "Vashmalle" was released as a single on 11 October 2018. It is a dance number pictured on Aamir Khan and Amitabh Bachchan; Aamir noted that he "was so excited to do a song with Mr Bachchan, that for the 1st time in my career I have enjoyed dancing!" The song "Suraiyya" was released on 17 October 2018. It is a dance number pictured on Katrina Kaif. The third song "Manzoor-e-Khuda" was released on 25 October 2018, along with the soundtrack album.

== Reception ==
Vipin Nair of The Hindu wrote "The Thugs of Hindostan soundtrack — barring ‘ Vashmalle ’ where the composers really get going — is sadly a mish-mash of an album. Given that the composers and lyricist Bhattacharya are collaborating with the same director who got Vishal-Shekhar to deliver the brilliant Tashan ten years ago (yes yes, he also did Dhoom 3 after that), I had higher expectations for the film’s score." Joginder Tuteja of Bollywood Hungama wrote "For a biggie like this, one expected an epic score. However, leave aside being epic; there isn't much to even celebrate quantity wise since there are just three songs in there. A disappointing score."

Rachit Gupta of The Times of India called the music the most disappointing aspect of the film, stating, "The songs just don't have the spark you'd expect from a film featuring Aamir Khan, Katrina Kaif and Amitabh Bachchan." Saibal Chatterjee of NDTV wrote "both the musical score (Atul-Ajay) and the dance moves smack more of kitschy Bollywood rather than evoking any sense of genuine time and place." Ananya Bhattacharya of India Today wrote "The songs in the film exist only because Katrina Kaif exists. Ajay-Atul's music is thoroughly underwhelming." Hannah Rachel Abraham of The Week wrote "The repetitive, soap opera-esque score by John Stewart Eduri and mostly forgettable music by Ajay-Atul do not help much either."

== Track listing ==
=== Hindi ===
No.	Title	Singer(s)	Length
1.	"Vashmalle"	Sukhwinder Singh, Vishal Dadlani	4:36
2.	"Suraiyya"	Shreya Ghoshal, Vishal Dadlani	4:20
3.	"Manzoor-e-Khuda"	Shreya Ghoshal, Sunidhi Chauhan, Sukhwinder Singh	5:05
4.	"Lori"	Amitabh Bachchan	1:35
Total length:			15:36

=== Tamil ===
No.	Title	Singer(s)	Length
1.	"Vasamaakku"	Divya Kumar, Nakash Aziz	4:36
2.	"Suraiyya"	Shreya Ghoshal, Nakash Aziz	4:20
3.	"Mannaa Kaetkudhaa"	Shreya Ghoshal, Sunidhi Chauhan, Divya Kumar	5:06
Total length:			14:02

=== Telugu ===
No.	Title	Singer(s)	Length
1.	"Vashamayye"	Divya Kumar, Nakash Aziz	4:36
2.	"Suraiyya"	Shreya Ghoshal, Nakash Aziz	4:20
3.	"Majjaare Khudhaa"	Shreya Ghoshal, Sunidhi Chauhan, Divya Kumar	5:06
Total length:			14:02
