= Manasu Mallige =

2017 film by S. Narayan

- Theatrical film poster
- Directed by: S. Narayan
- Written by: Nagraj Manjule
- Screenplay by: S. Narayan
- Produced by: Rockline Venkatesh; Akash Chawla
- Starring: Rinku Rajguru; Nishanth
- Cinematography: Manohar Joshi
- Edited by: Srikanth
- Music by: Songs & Score: Ajay–Atul; Additional Song: S. Narayan
- Production companies: Rockline Productions; Zee Studios
- Release date: 31 March 2017
- Country: India
- Language: Kannada

Manasu Mallige (transl. The heart is a jasmine flower) is an Indian Kannada-language romantic drama film directed by S. Narayan and produced by Rockline Venkatesh and Akash Chawla. The film, a remake of Nagraj Manjule's Marathi film Sairat (2016), features Rinku Rajguru, reprising her role from the original, and Nishanth (Nataraj). The original soundtrack by Ajay–Atul has been re-used with Kannada lyrics, and the cinematography is by Manohar Joshi.

== Plot ==
The film depicts a love story between a girl of an upper caste and a boy from a lower caste; thus it comments on the caste system in India. This commentary culminates into honour killing; honour killing is prevalent in few parts of rural India as well as urban India.

== Cast ==
- Rinku Rajguru as Sanjana "Sanju" Patil
- Nishanth as Parashu
- Tanaji Galgunde
- Sourabh Kulakarni

== Soundtrack ==
Manasu Malligey

Soundtrack album by Ajay–Atul
- Released: 31 March 2017
- Recorded: 2017
- Genre: Film soundtrack
- Language: Kannada
- Label: Zee Music South
- Producer: Rockline Venkatesh

The songs and background score for the film are composed by composer duo Ajay–Atul, who had scored for the original Marathi film. This marks their debut in the Kannada cinema. One additional song was composed by S. Narayan. The music was officially released on the Valentine's Day on 14 February 2017. Minister of Water Resources, M. B. Patil officially released the audio at Chamundeshwari Studios in Bengaluru.

Ajay–Atul kept the original score and just added Kannada lyrics in place of the original Marathi ones. All songs have been sung by the same singers who rendered the original songs, except an additional song which has been rendered by Sonu Nigam.

No.	Title	Lyrics	Music	Singer(s)	Length
1.	"Yaare Neenu Parivaala"	V. Nagendra Prasad	Ajay–Atul	Ajay Gogavale
2.	"Adaviyolage"	Kaviraj	Ajay–Atul	Shreya Ghoshal
3.	"Ayyayyappo"	Yogaraj Bhat	Ajay–Atul	Ajay–Atul
4.	"Thangaliya Roopa"	Pradyumna Narahalli	Ajay–Atul	Chinmayi, Ajay Gogavale
5.	"Ee Lokavella"	K. Kalyan	S. Narayan	Sonu Nigam

== Reception ==
A critic from The Times of India rated the film three out of five and wrote that "If you are a fan of romantic tales that deal with young love and the perils they face to keep it alive, this could fancy your taste. Go ahead, watch it once if you are looking for a weekend watch option". A critic from The New Indian Express wrote that "A film comes with good visuals, but the music by Ajay-Atul certainly retains the flavour of the original and can be the USP of Manasu Mallige, catering to the youth". A critic from Deccan Chronicle wrote that "As a whole, it has what a decent, good film should have - a sensible story, decent making, lovely performances, and soothing music. All is well, if it ends well!". A critic from Bangalore Mirror wrote that "Manasu Mallige is not a bad film. It has a relevant subject which makes up for its over-dependence on the original".
