= Taar (film) =

- Official release poster
- Directed by: Pankaj Sonawane
- Written by: Pankaj Sonawane
- Produced by: Sandeep Patil; Abhijeet Mhetre; Namita Gogate
- Starring: Nagraj Manjule; Pooja Dolas; Bhushan Manjule
- Cinematography: Benjamin Burghartz
- Edited by: Makarand Bharat Shinde
- Music by: Ankush A. Boradkar
- Production company: Illusion Ethereal Studios
- Distributed by: Mumbai Film Company
- Release date: 7 November 2020
- Running time: 19 minutes
- Country: India
- Language: Marathi

Taar (transl. Telegram) is a 2020 Indian Marathi-language drama short film written and directed by Pankaj Sonawane featuring Nagraj Manjule, Pooja Dolas, Bhushan Manjule. It is produced by Illusion Ethereal Studios. The film was released on 7 November 2020 on YouTube.

== Plot ==
The story is set during the Indo-Pakistani War of 1971. War has had serious effects on countries. Many soldiers have lost their lives protecting their country and loved ones. Before the introduction of technology, telegram was the only means of communication for these soldiers with their families. These telegrams conveyed many good and bad messages from soldiers to their families. Thus, Telegram tells the story of a postman who carries a bundle of such telegrams and delivers the messages of these soldiers to their families. But these messages also contain some bad news such as the deaths of soldiers who fought in wars like 1971.

== Cast ==
- Nagraj Manjule as Postman
- Pooja Dolas
- Jyoti Joshi
- Ramchandra Dhumal
- Bhushan Manjule

== Marketing ==
The teaser of the film was released on 31 October 2020 by Riteish Deshmukh's production house Mumbai Film Company. Deshmukh promoted the short film by sharing the teaser on his other social media handles.

== Release ==
The film was released on 7 November 2020 on Mumbai Film Company's YouTube channel.
