= Sneha Khanwalkar =

Indian music director (born 1983)

- Born: 28 April 1983 (age 43); Indore, Madhya Pradesh, India
- Occupation: Film score composer
- Years active: 2004–present
- Spouse: Kanu Behl (m. 2019)

Sneha Khanwalkar (born 28 April 1983) is an Indian music director who works in Hindi films. She is best known for her score for the film, Oye Lucky! Lucky Oye!, and also for Gangs of Wasseypur Part 1 and Part 2. She was nominated in Best Music Director category at the 58th Filmfare Awards for Gangs of Wasseypur Part 1 & Part 2 (credited as the music director of Gangs of Wasseypur). She is only the second woman to gain a nomination in this category 28 years after Usha Khanna.

== Early life and education ==
Khanwalkar was born and brought up in Indore, where her mother's family was entrenched in the Gwalior gharana of Hindustani classical music, through which she learned music as a child.

During her HSC vacations, she did an animation course and art direction course. In 2001, her family moved to Mumbai, with an aim of her joining an engineering college, but instead she started working in animation followed by art direction before deciding on music direction as a career, after rediscovering her childhood passion for music.

== Career ==
In 2004, she scored the film The Hope, which competed at the Internationales Filmfest Emden in Germany. Meanwhile, she also did the title track for Ruchi Narain's film, KAL – Yesterday and Tomorrow (2005), though her big break came when she composed music for the 2007 film Go, produced by Ram Gopal Varma, and also got to compose a song for Sarkar Raj (2008).

In 2008, she won accolades for her score for the film, Oye Lucky! Lucky Oye! for which she travelled through rural North India, especially Haryana, where she visited the Raagini music festival, while researching for the film's music, eventually she created a hit soundtrack, embellished with Haryanvi musical influences.

She was the music director of Anurag Kashyap's celebrated duology Gangs of Wasseypur & Gangs of Wasseypur Part 2, for which she was nominated in Best Music Director category at the 58th Filmfare Awards.

=== Sound Trippin ===
She was also the host of a popular music-based MTV mini-series called Sound Trippin in which she traveled to places like Punjab, Banaras, Yellapur (North Canara, Karnataka), Goa, Leh, etc. collecting local and ambient sounds from everyday singers to local musicians, and creating a final piece of music that resonates with the feel and the sounds from that location. The show was shot by Babble Fish Productions. She hosted the first season as well as the first 6 episodes of the second season.

== Discography ==
=== Film ===
Year	Film	Note(s)
2006	Undisputed	Short film
2005	Kal: Yesterday and Tomorrow	One song
2007	Go	All songs
2008	Oye Lucky! Lucky Oye!	All songs
2010	Love Sex Aur Dhokha	All songs
2011	Bheja Fry 2	One song
2012	Gangs of Wasseypur	All songs Nominated - Filmfare Award for Best Music Director (for the music of both parts)
2012	Supermen of Malegaon	Documentary
2014	Dishkiyaoon	Two songs
2014	Youngistaan	Two songs
2014	Khoobsurat	Four songs
2015	Detective Byomkesh Bakshy!	One song along with Dibakar Banerjee
2015	Singh is Bling	One song, a remix version of the song made in MTV Sound Trippin episode 1
2017	Hanuman Da' Damdaar	All songs Also provided the voice for the character "Seeti"
2018	Manto Beyond the Boundaries	Four songs All Songs
2020	Ghoomketu	Two songs
2020	Trance	As a playback singer for one track Malayalam film
2020	Raat Akeli Hai	All songs
2022	Sharmaji Namkeen	All songs
2022	Chup: Revenge of The Artist	One song
2022	Mister Mummy	Four songs
2024	Love Sex Aur Dhokha 2	One song
2024	CTRL	All songs
2024	Monkey Man	Five songs

=== Web series ===
Year	Title	Platform	Notes
2020	REJCTX	ZEE5	Theme Music
2021	Dhindora	YouTube	Original track
2022	London Files	Voot	Original & Background Score
2023	Cinema Marte Dum Tak	Amazon Prime Video	"Psuedo Saiyaan"
2023	Star Wars: Visions	Disney+	Episode: "The Bandits of Golak"

=== Television ===
- 2012 - MTV Sound Trippin
