= Ruchi Narain =

Indian director, screenwriter, and producer

- Occupation: Filmmaker
- Notable work: Hazaaron Khwaishein Aisi and Kal: Yesterday and Tomorrow

Ruchi Narain is an Indian film director, screenwriter, and producer widely known as the writer for the critically acclaimed film Hazaaron Khwaishein Aisi (2003). She has also directed and wrote films like Kal: Yesterday and Tomorrow (2005), Hanuman: Da' Damdaar (2017) and Netflix original film Guilty (2020).

== Early life and education ==
Her family is originally from New Delhi, however, she has never lived there. She spent her early years in Calcutta, Dubai, Sri Lanka, and Muscat, Oman where she attended the Sultan's School, The Woodstock School in Mussoorie, and Qatar. She moved to Mumbai for College and has lived there ever since.

== Career ==
She started her career as an assistant director to Sudhir Mishra in Is Raat Ki Subah Nahin (1996). Subsequently, she was associate director, Second Unit Director and Screenplay writer and edited the film Hazaaron Khwaishein Aisi for which she won the Best Story Filmfare Award, Zee Cine Award and Star Screen Award. It was a love story set against the political backdrop of India in the 1970s.

She was the writer-director of the contemporary urban thriller Kal: Yesterday and Tomorrow (2005), which also won her the Osian's Cinefan Film Festival Critics Award. She raised the financing for this film by making a business plan and bringing together a consortium of 14 investors'.

Subsequently, she started the production company R.A.T Films with two partners Ashutosh Shah and Taher Shabbir which has done over a hundred commercials for a variety of products as well as produced the animation film Hanuman: Da' Damdaar (2017) which she wrote and directed. It was the biggest animation film release in India ever, voiced by the superstar Salman Khan and featuring a litany of Bollywood stars; Raveena Tandon, Javed Akhtar, Kunal Khemu, Vinay Pathak, Chunky Pandey, Saurabh Shukla and Makrand Deshpande.

Her film Guilty (2020) on Netflix starring Kiara Advani has met with a lot of success and acclaim. It is set in an elite Delhi College and centers around an allegation of rape during the #MeToo Movement in India.

She was the showrunner and the lead director for the 2020 8-part comedy series 'Hundred' on the platform Disney+ Hotstar which she and her partners created, wrote and produced. The show is a light and irreverent take on two very different women who struggle to do what they want to do in the city of Mumbai. One of them is played by Lara Dutta as a policewoman who feels she can't break the glass ceiling. The other is a young girl, played by Rinku Rajguru who discovers she has only a hundred days to live. Together, they try and make their lives count.

She has also been the showrunner and director of the primetime drama thriller series Karmma Calling, produced by R.A.T. Films. Her other works include producing two documentaries, In the Pink and The last dance. Further, a notable AD film she directed was "The Divide: A social experiment" for Paytm.

== Personal life ==
Narain is the single mother of her daughter Vira who she adopted in 2019.

== Filmography ==
Year	Film	Director	Writer	Producer	Note
2000	Snip!	No	story	No	
2003	Calcutta Mail	No	Yes	No	Credit as Ruchi Narayan
2003	Hazaaron Khwaishein Aisi	No	Yes	No	
2005	Kal: Yesterday and Tomorrow	Yes	Yes	No	
2006	In The Pink	No	No	Yes	Wildlife documentary
2007	The Last Dance	No	No	Yes	Wildlife documentary
2017	Hanuman Da' Damdaar	Yes	Yes	Yes	Animation film
2020	Guilty	Yes	Yes	No	Netflix film
2020	Hundred	Yes	Yes	Yes	Web series
2024	Karmma Calling	Yes	Yes	Yes	Web series

As Assistant Director

- Khoya Khoya Chand (2007) - also editor
- Hazaaron Khwaishein Aisi (2003) (associate director)
- Is Raat Ki Subah Nahin (1996)

== Awards ==
- Filmfare Award
  - Best Story: Hazaaron Khwaishein Aisi
- Osian's Cinefan Film Festival of Asian and Arab Cinema Critics' Award
- In the Pink Finalist at Wildscreen Awards 2008
- The Last Dance Finalist at Wildscreen Awards 2008
