= Filmfare Award for Best Male Playback Singer – Marathi =

Filmfare Award Marathi for Best Male Playback Singer
- Awarded for: Best Performance by a Male Playback Singer
- Country: India
- Presented by: Filmfare
- First award: Ajay Gogavale, Lai Bhaari "Maauli Maauli" (2014)
- Currently held by: Ajay Gogavale, Ata Thambaycha Naay! "Title Track" (2025)
- Website: Filmfare Awards

The Filmfare Best Male Playback Singer Award is given by the Filmfare magazine as part of its annual Filmfare Awards for Marathi Cinema, to the best male playback singer of a soundtrack. This award category was first presented in 2014. Ajay Gogavale was the first recipient of this award for his song "Maauli Maauli" from the film Lai Bhaari.

== Superlatives ==
Superlative	Artist	Record
Most Awards	Adarsh Shinde	3
Most Awards	Ajay Gogavale	3
Most Nominations	Ajay Gogavale	10
Most consecutive wins	Adarsh Shinde	3
Most nominations without ever winning	Swapnil Bandodkar	4
Most consecutive year nominations	Swapnil Bandodkar	4

== Winners and nominees ==
=== 2010s ===
Year	Photos of winners	Singer	Song	Film	Ref.
2014		Ajay Gogavale	"Maauli Maauli"	Lai Bhaari	
2014		Ajay Gogavale	"Fandry"	Fandry	
2014		Hrishikesh Ranade	"Baavare Prem He"	Baavare Prem He	
2014		Swapnil Bandodkar	"Mala Ved Lagale"	Timepass	
2014		Mangesh Dhakade	"Mani Achanak"	Dusari Goshta	
2015		Shankar Mahadevan	"Sur Niragas Ho"	Katyar Kaljat Ghusali	
2015		Swapnil Bandodkar	"Saavar Re"	Mitwaa	
2015		Mahesh Kale	"Aruni Kirani"	Katyar Kaljat Ghusali	
2015		Jasraj Joshi	"Kiti Sangaychay Mala"	Double Seat	
2015		Hrishikesh Ranade	"Ritya Sarya Disha"	Double Seat	
2015		Harshavardhan Wavre	"Roz Mala"	Classmates	
2016		Ajay Gogavale	"Yad Lagla"	Sairat	
2016		Ajay-Atul	"Zingaat"	Sairat	
2016		Swapnil Bandodkar	"Priyankara"	YZ	
2016		Jasraj Jayant Joshi	"Ti Swapnatalya"	Phuntroo	
2016		Adarsh Shinde, Anand Shinde	"Awaaz Vadhav DJ"	Poshter Girl	
2016		Pravin Kuvar	"Pipani"	Photocopy	
2017		Adarsh Shinde	"Vitthala"	Ringan	
2017		Ajay Gogavale	"Dev Pahila"	Ringan	
2017		Swapnil Bandodkar	"Vate Vari"	Hrudayantar	
2017		Jasraj Jayant Joshi	"Muramba"	Muramba	
2017		Hrishikesh Ranade	"Jara Jara"	Ti Saddhya Kay Karte	
2017		Nikhil Modgi	"Bhetali Tu Punha"	Bhetali Tu Punha	
2018	NO CEREMONY				
2019	NO CEREMONY				

=== 2020s ===
Year	Photos of winners	Singer	Song	Film	Ref.
2020		Adarsh Shinde	"Tula Japnar Aahe"	Khari Biscuit	
2020		Avadhoot Gupte	"Thackeray"	Thackeray	
2020		Jasraj Jayant Joshi	"Querida Querida"	Girlfriend	
2020		Rohit Raut	"Manmohini"	Mogra Phulaalaa	
2020		Rohit Raut	"Nate He Konte"	Triple Seat	
2020		Abhay Jodhpurkar	"Haluvar Hak Tu"	Baba	
2021		Adarsh Shinde	"Rada Dhurala"	Dhurala	
2021		Abhay Jodhpurkar	"Kona Mag Bhir Bhirta"	Preetam	
2021		Adarsh Shinde	"Jaanata Raja"	Pandu	
2021		Mohan Kanna	"Tu Chal Re Mana"	Kesari	
2021		Pravin Kuwar	"Basta Bandhashala"	Basta	
2022 (7th)		Rahul Deshpande	"Kaivalyagaan"	Me Vasantrao	
2022 (7th)		Ajay Gogavale	"Kanha"	Chandramukhi	
2022 (7th)		Ajay Gogavale	"Ved Tujha"	Ved	
2022 (7th)		Avadhoot Gupte	"Raja Aala"	Pawankhind	
2022 (7th)		Rahul Deshpande	"Khal Khal Goda"	Godavari	
2022 (7th)		Anand Bhate, Prathamesh Laghate	"Ilusa Ha Deh"	Panghrun	
2022 (7th)		Sagar Salunke	"Anand Harapla"	Dharmaveer	
2023 (8th)		Jayesh Khare, Mayur Sukale	"Gau Nako Kisna"	Maharashtra Shahir	
2023 (8th)		Adarsh Shinde	"Marathi Pori"	Jhimma 2	
2023 (8th)		Ajay Gogavale	"Umgaya Baap Ra"	Baaplyok	
2023 (8th)		Ajay Gogavale	"Jay Jay Maharashtra Maza"	Maharashtra Shahir	
2023 (8th)		Jayesh Khare, Master Avan	"Darav Darav"	Maharashtra Shahir	
2023 (8th)		Gulraj Singh	"Hori Jayee Re"	Unaad	
2024 (9th)		Rahul Deshpande	"Sarale Saare"	Amaltash	
2024 (9th)		Rahul Deshpande	"Hey Sharade"	Phullwanti	
2024 (9th)		Abhay Jodhpurkar	"Navasachi Gauri Mazi"	Gharat Ganpati	
2024 (9th)		Avadhoot Gupte	"Zagamaga"	Ole Aale	
2024 (9th)		Adarsh Shinde	"Naachnara"	Paani	
2024 (9th)		Shankar Mahadevan	"Paani - Title Track"	Paani	
2025 (10th)		Ajay Gogavale	"Title Track"	Ata Thambaycha Naay!	
2025 (10th)		Ajay Gogavale	"Rangpooja"	Dashavatar	
2025 (10th)		Sahil Kulkarni	"Rutuchakra"	Dashavatar	
2025 (10th)		Harshavardhan Wavare	"Malhari"	Gondhal	
2025 (10th)		Avadhoot Gupte	"Dis Sarale"	Fussclass Dabhade	
2025 (10th)		Sonu Nigam	"Mann Jaie"	April May 99	
