= MTV Sound Trippin =

Music television show on MTV India

MTV Sound Trippin is a music television docuseries on MTV India, part of the channel's strategy to place focus on original music.

== Format ==
The show follows Hindi film music director Sneha Khanwalkar, who travels to ten cities across the country to record unusual sounds and create ten songs, one for each place she visits, that capture the spirit of the places. Many of the artists who record for the show "have never before recorded in a studio".

== Reception ==
The show has been well received. Amitava Sanyal of Hindustan Times called it a "remarkable experiment". Sneha Mahadevan of DNA said that "The shoots, crisp edits, refreshingly new visuals take this show to a new level altogether".
