= Karmala =

- City
- Location in Maharashtra, India
- Coordinates: 18.42°N 75.2°E
- Country: India
- State: Maharashtra
- District: Solapur

Government
  - Body: Karmala Municipal Council
  - Mayor: Vacant
  - MLA: Shri. Narayan Patil
  - MP: Shri. Dhairyashil Mohite-Patil
- Elevation: 562 m (1,844 ft)

Population (2018)
  - Total: 45,000

Languages
  - Official: Marathi
- Time zone: UTC+5:30 (IST)
- PIN: 413203
- Telephone code: 02182
- Vehicle registration: MH-45

Karmala is a taluka of Solapur district in the Indian state of Maharashtra. Karmala is a city with municipal council. Karmala is famous for the temple of Shri. Kamaladevi. There is a significance of no. 96 for the temple. The Kamala Bhavani Temple was built by Rao Raje Nimbalkar in 1727. It is considered to be the second seat of Tulajapur Tulaja Bhavani. Built in Hemdpanthi style, the temple has entry doors in East South and North directions. The uniqueness of this temple architecture is, the temple is having well of 96 steps. The temple is constructed with 96 pillars. The temple top consists of 96 pictures and 96 ‘overyas’. Navaratra festival is celebrated with great devotion. The annual festival (yatra) is held during Kartik porrnima to Chaturthi.

== Geography ==
Karmala is the headquarters of the taluka bearing the same name. It is located about 12 miles (19 km) to the north of the Jeur railway station and about 82 miles (132 km) from the Solapur railway station. It has an average elevation of 562 metres (1,844 ft).

== Demographics ==
According to the 1971 Census the population was 14,051.

At the 2011 India census, Karmala had a population of 21,928. Karmala had an average literacy rate of 71%, higher than the national average of 50%.

Languages: Marathi-98% (official language), Hindi-1.5%, English-0.5%.

== Facilities ==
This municipal town, being the headquarters of a taluka, has the offices of the Mamlatdar and the Block Development Officer besides that of the Court of the Civil Judge, Junior Division. There is also a police station the jurisdiction of which extends over 96 villages. It has a post and telegraph office. The water-supply to the town is piped and protected. The town has been electrified. The educational facilities are provided by five primary schools conducted by the municipality, the Mahatma Gandhi Vidyalaya conducted by the Karmala Taluka Co-operative Education Society and Yashwantrao Chavan College of Arts and Commerce conducted by the Vidyavikas, Karmala. The Government basic training college is also located at Karmala. The Samaj Seva Mandal governs the Karmaveer Annasaheb Jagtap Vidyalaya. A Government resthouse is also located at Karmala.

Prior to 1902 only wells formed the main source of water-supply to the town. In 1902, attempts were made to store the water in four small tanks constructed for the purpose and was supplied to the town populace. In 1928 four bores were drilled and three more were drilled subsequently. However, water shortage was always felt. The new Sina scheme was therefore taken up in 1960 from where the town now gets ample water-supply. Underground drainage system has not been introduced in the town. There are stone-lined gutters. The municipality makes the arrangement for the removal of night-soil.

The municipality provides facilities for primary education and conducts five primary schools, two for boys and one for girls and one each for boys and girls with Urdu as a medium of instruction. The municipality also maintains a dispensary with four cots.

Many other facilities are provided by the municipality which has constructed a vegetable market known as Jagdamba Bhaji Market at a cost of Rs. 50.243. It was declared open on 28 June 1962. There are a number of dharmashalas in the town and the municipality undertakes the maintenance of the same. The municipality conducts a free reading room and a library.
