= Rinku Rajguru =

Indian actress (born 2001)

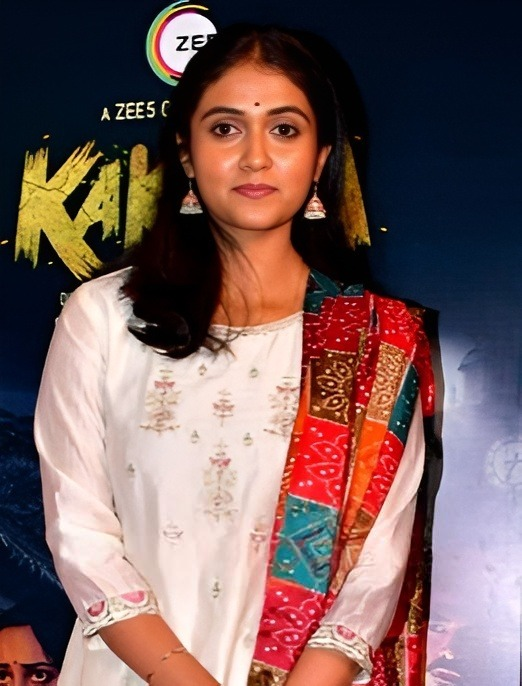
- Rajguru in 2024
- Born: Prerana Mahadev Rajguru; 3 June 2001 (age 25); Akluj, Maharashtra, India
- Occupation: Actress
- Years active: 2016–present

Prerana Rajguru (born 3 June 2001), professionally known as Rinku Rajguru, is an Indian actress who works primarily in Marathi films, with occasional appearances in Hindi films. She made her acting debut at the age of fifteen as Archi in Nagraj Manjule's Sairat (2016), which established her as a prominent figure in Marathi cinema. She has received several accolades, including a National Film Award, two Maharashtra State Film Awards and two Filmfare Awards Marathi.

Born and brought up inAkluj, Maharashtra, she rose to prominence following the success of Sairat and subsequently reprised her role in its Kannada remake, Manasu Mallige (2017). She later appeared in the Marathi films Kaagar (2019), Aathva Rang Premacha (2022), Jhimma 2 (2023) and Asha (2025). Her Hindi-language work includes the anthology film Unpaused (2020), as well as 200: Halla Ho (2021), Ankahi Kahaniya (2021) and Jhund (2022). She made her streaming debut opposite Lara Dutta in the action-comedy series Hundred (2020).

== Early life and family ==
Rajguru was born on 3 June 2001 in Akluj, a town in the Solapur district of Maharashtra, and was named Prerana Mahadev Rajguru; "Rinku" is a family nickname that she has used professionally. Her father, Mahadev Rajguru, teaches at the Sadashiv Mane Vidyalaya in Akluj, and her mother, Asha Rajguru, teaches at a Zilla Parishad school. She has a younger brother, Siddharth.

She attended the Jijamata Kanya Prashala in Akluj. The attention that followed Sairat made regular schooling impractical, and she sat the Class 10 state board examination as a private candidate in 2017, scoring 66.40 per cent. She was subsequently enrolled in the arts stream at the Jai Tuljabhavani Arts and Science Junior College at Tembhurni in Madha taluka, and passed the Class 12 examination in 2019 with 82 per cent. She went on to read for an arts degree through distance education, telling Scroll.in in 2021 that she had "never experienced college life" and studied between shoots.

Rajguru had wanted to become a veterinary doctor before she was cast in Sairat, and took part in dance competitions during her school years. She continued to live with her parents and brother in Akluj after becoming a public figure, describing the town as offering the privacy and quiet that Mumbai does not.

== Career ==
=== 2016–2019: Breakthrough and Early Roles ===
Rajguru met director Nagraj Manjule in 2013, at age twelve while in Class 7, and after auditioning for him was cast as Archana “Archi” Patil about a year later, having come from the same part of Solapur district. To prepare for the role, she learned to ride a motorcycle, drive a tractor and ride a horse, and performed several of her own stunts. Sairat, a romantic drama about two college students from different castes whose relationship faces opposition from their families, premiered at the 66th Berlin International Film Festival before its theatrical release in India on 29 April 2016. Rajguru's performance received widespread critical acclaim. Pratik Ghosh of Daily News and Analysis wrote, "Rinku shows uncommon maturity in handling a complex role, overshadowing Akash Thosar in the process." Critic Baradwaj Rangan described her as "simply wonderful at conveying Archie's journey." The film became a major commercial success, grossing around ₹110 crore (equivalent to ₹173 crore or US$18 million in 2026) against a budget of approximately ₹4 crore (equivalent to ₹6.3 crore or US$670,000 in 2026) and holding the record as the highest-grossing Marathi film until 2026. At the 63rd National Film Awards, Rajguru received a Special Mention in the feature film category, making her one of the youngest performers to receive national recognition. She also won Best Child Artist at the 53rd Maharashtra State Film Awards, as well as Best Actress and Best Female Debut at the 3rd Filmfare Awards Marathi, where Sairat took eleven awards in all.

In 2017 she reprised her role in Manasu Mallige, the Kannada remake of Sairat, becoming one of the few performers to portray the same character in a remake of their own debut film. Directed by S. Narayan, the film achieved moderate success. Although Rajguru's Kannada received some criticism, The Hindu critic Archana Nathan praised her performance, writing, "Rinku, despite drawing attention to her Kannada, delivers a powerful performance."

Three years passed before her next Marathi release. She said the delay was deliberate, as most of the scripts she was offered were variations of Sairat. She returned in Makarand Mane's political drama Kaagar (2019), playing Rani, a young woman drawn into rural power politics. Rajguru said she chose the role because it was distinctly different from Archi. The film drew mixed reviews, though her performance was generally well received.

=== 2020–present: Hindi Projects and Return to Marathi Cinema ===
In 2020, she made her streaming debut in the Disney+ Hotstar action-comedy series Hundred, directed by Ruchi Narain, in which a terminally ill government clerk becomes an informant for a police officer played by Lara Dutta. India Today critic Divyanshi Sharma praised her performance, writing, "With her intense expressions, appropriate body language and flawless portrayal of the carefree Netra, Rinku steals the show in various segments." Rajguru was subsequently nominated for Best Actress in Comedy at the Filmfare OTT Awards. Her first Hindi screen appearance came in the Amazon Prime Video anthology Unpaused (2020), in the segment "Rat-A-Tat", directed by Tannishtha Chatterjee, in which she starred opposite Lillete Dubey. She led the ZEE5 film 200: Halla Ho playing a young Dalit woman who organises her neighbourhood against a serial rapist; the character was loosely based on activist Usha Narayane, while the film was inspired by the 2004 lynching of Akku Yadav in Nagpur. She appeared alongside Amol Palekar and Barun Sobti, with reviewers praising her natural and engaging performance while noting that the script offered her limited scope. Later that year, Rajguru appeared in the Netflix anthology Ankahi Kahaniya, in the 1980s-set segment directed by Abhishek Chaubey, for which she learned embroidery.

Rajguru made her theatrical Hindi debut in 2022 with Manjule's sports biopic Jhund, based on the life of Vijay Barse, reuniting with both Manjule and Akash Thosar. The film, which starred Amitabh Bachchan, received critical acclaim but was unsuccessful at the box office. After a three-year gap, she returned to Marathi cinema with the romantic drama Aathva Rang Premacha. In 2023 she joined the ensemble of Hemant Dhome's comedy drama Jhimma 2, as the daughter-in-law of Nirmiti Sawant's character, who travels to the United Kingdom with a group of women. Sameer Ahire of Movie Talkies praised her performance, stating, "Rajguru finally gets a good role after Sairat, and you are gonna love her for sure." The film grossed over ₹14 crore (equivalent to ₹15 crore or US$1.6 million in 2026), making it one of the highest-grossing Marathi releases of the year.

Rajguru starred alongside Subodh Bhave and Prarthana Behere in the supernatural romantic comedy Better Half Chi Love Story in 2025. She played a possessive wife whose spirit occupies half of her widower husband's body. The film received negative reviews, with Anub George of The Times of India rating it two stars out of five, although several critics praised the lead performances. She next played Malti, an Accredited Social Health Activist working in rural Maharashtra, in Deepak Patil's social drama Asha, for which she spent time with serving ASHA workers to prepare for the role. Reviewing the film for Maharashtra Times, Janhvi Bhatkar observed, "She effectively conveys the restraint on her face, the determination in her eyes and the determination boiling inside." Asha won four awards at the 61st Maharashtra State Film Awards, including Best Actress Award for Rajguru. She also received a nomination for the Filmfare Award Marathi for Best Actress Critics.

Rajguru appeared in 2026 in Ankush Chaudhari's comedy Punha Ekda Sade Made Teen, a sequel to Saade Maade Teen (2007), starring Ashok Saraf, Bharat Jadhav and Makarand Anaspure. Although reviewers found the film uneven, they generally praised Rajguru's energetic performance despite her underwritten role. The film, however, failed commercially and could not replicate the success of its predecessor.

== Other work and public image ==
Rajguru appeared in “Toofan Aala,” the 2017 anthem for the Satyamev Jayate Water Cup, organised by Aamir Khan’s Paani Foundation. Composed by Ajay-Atul and directed by Nagraj Manjule, the video featured farmers from drought-affected villages alongside several Marathi actors. She has spoken publicly about caste and gender in interviews tied to her work, telling Firstpost that silence on social issues affects art, and arguing that atrocities against Dalit women need to be discussed openly.

Her debut is frequently cited as an example of Marathi cinema casting outside conventional star conventions. With no acting training or industry connections, Rajguru was praised by director Sujay Dahake for her ability to portray young love naturally. Rajguru has consistently resisted being identified with her character Archi, saying that she works “as Rinku, not Archi,” and that changes in her appearance are based on her roles rather than pressure to conform to conventional heroine standards. She has also said that she does not understand stardom and prefers to remain as she is.

== Filmography ==
Key
†	Denotes films that have not yet been released

=== Films ===
Year	Title	Role	Language	Notes	Ref.
2016	Sairat	Archana (Archi) Patil	Marathi		
2017	Manasu Mallige	Sanju	Kannada		
2019	Kaagar	Rani / Priydarshani Deshmukh	Marathi		
2020	Makeup	Purvi	Marathi		
2020	Unpaused	Priyanka	Hindi	In "Rat A Tat" Segment	
2021	200: Halla Ho	Asha Surve	Hindi	ZEE5 film	
2021	Ankahi Kahaniya	Manjari	Hindi	Netflix film	
2022	Jhund	Monica	Hindi		
2022	Aathva Rang Premacha	Krutika	Marathi		
2023	Jhimma 2	Taniya Konde Patil	Marathi		
2025	Better Half Chi Love Story	Sonia Patil	Marathi		
2025	Asha	Malti	Marathi		
2026	Punha Ekda Sade Made Teen	Kamini	Marathi		
2026	Jijai	Jija	Marathi		
TBA	Khillar †	TBA	Marathi		
TBA	Pinga †	TBA	Marathi		
TBA	Thappa †	TBA	Marathi		

=== Web series ===
Year	Title	Role	Network	Ref.
2020	Hundred	Netra Patil	Hotstar	

=== Music Video ===
- Baap Vithuraya (2026)

== Awards and nominations ==
Awards	Year	Category	Work	Result	Ref.
Maharashtra State Film Awards	2016	Best Child Artist	Sairat	Won	
Maharashtra State Film Awards	2023	Best Actress	Asha	Won	
Maharashtracha Favourite Kon?	2016	Favourite Actress	Sairat	Won	
Maharashtracha Favourite Kon?	2016	Favourite Debut Actress	Sairat	Won	
Maharashtracha Favourite Kon?	2016	Favourite Face Of The Year	—N/a	Won	
Maharashtracha Favourite Kon?	2019	Favourite Face Of The Year	—N/a	Nominated	
Maharashtracha Favourite Kon?	2021	Favourite Face Of The Year	—N/a	Nominated	
Maharashtracha Favourite Kon?	2021	Favourite Actress	Sairat	Won	
Maharashtracha Favourite Kon?	2024	Favourite Actress	Jhimma 2	Nominated	
Maharashtracha Favourite Kon?	2024	Favourite Face Of The Year	—N/a	Nominated	
National Film Awards	2016	Special Mention (feature film)	Sairat	Won	
Filmfare Awards Marathi	2017	Best Female Debut	Sairat	Won	
Filmfare Awards Marathi	2017	Best Actress	Sairat	Won	
Filmfare Awards Marathi	2026	Best Actress Critics	Asha	Nominated	
Filmfare OTT Awards	2020	Best Actress in Comedy Series	Hundred	Nominated	
Zee Cine Awards	2016	Best Marathi Actor (Female)	Sairat	Won	
Zee Chitra Gaurav Puraskar	2017	Best Actress	Sairat	Nominated	
Zee Chitra Gaurav Puraskar	2017	Perfromance of the Year	Sairat	Won	
