= Akash Thosar =

Indian actor

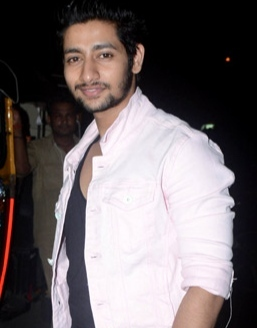
- Thosar in 2021
- Born: 24 February 1993 (age 33); Karmala, Maharashtra, India
- Occupation: Actor
- Years active: 2016–present
- Known for: Sairat; Lust Stories; 1962: The War in the Hills

Akash Thosar (born 24 February 1993) is an Indian actor who appears in Marathi and Hindi films. He is best known for his role as Parshya in the 2016 Marathi film Sairat for which he won a Filmfare Award Marathi Best Male Debut. He was ranked eighth in The Times of India's Top 20 Most Desirable Men of Maharashtra in 2019.

== Career ==
Akash Thosar was born and raised in Karmala, Maharashtra. A former wrestler, he made a debut in the film industry with the Sairat movie in 2016 which was directed by Nagraj Manjule and received immense success with this film. Thosar later starred in the lead role in Mahesh Manjrekar's Marathi movie FU: Friendship Unlimited in 2017.

In 2018, he starred in Netflix original Lust Stories, an anthology film, paired opposite Radhika Apte in the segment directed by Anurag Kashyap. In 2022, he was seen in Jhund directed by Nagraj Manjule. He was also cast in 1962: The War in the Hills as an army officer. In 2023 he was starred a role of chef in Ghar Banduk Biryani, alongside Sayaji Shinde and Nagraj Manjule. He will next portray Shivaji in the historical film Bal Shivaji.

== Filmography ==
=== Films ===
Key
†	Denotes films that have not yet been released

Year	Title	Role	Language	Notes	Ref.
2016	Sairat	Prashant "Parshya" Kale	Marathi	Debut	
2017	FU: Friendship Unlimited	Sahil Mahajan	Marathi		
2018	Lust Stories	Tejas Bhave	Hindi	Anurag Kashyap's Segment	
2022	Jhund	Sambhya	Hindi		
2023	Ghar Banduk Biryani	Raju	Marathi	Released in four languages	
TBA	Bal Shivaji †	Shivaji	Marathi	Filming	

=== Web series ===
Year	Title	Role	Language	Ref.
2021	1962: The War in the Hills	Sepoy Kishan Yadav	Hindi	

== Awards and nominations ==
Year	Award	Category	Film	Result	Ref.
2016	Maharashtracha Favourite Kon?	Favourite Actor	Sairat	Won	
2016	Maharashtracha Favourite Kon?	Favourite Style Icon	Sairat	Won	
2017	Zee Marathi Awards	Best Male Debut	Sairat	Won	
2017	Zee Cine Award	Best Marathi Actor	Sairat	Won	
2017	Zee Chitra Gaurav Puraskar	Best Actor	Sairat	Nominated	
2017	Zee Chitra Gaurav Puraskar	Best Debut – Male	Sairat	Won	
2017	3rd Filmfare Awards Marathi	Best Actor	Sairat	Nominated	
2017	3rd Filmfare Awards Marathi	Best Male Debut	Sairat	Won	
