= Sairat =

2016 Indian film by Nagraj Manjule

- Theatrical release poster
- Directed by: Nagraj Manjule
- Written by: Nagraj Manjule; Bharat Manjule
- Produced by: Nitin Keni; Nikhil Sane; Nagraj Manjule
- Starring: Rinku Rajguru; Akash Thosar
- Cinematography: Sudhakar Reddy Yakkanti
- Edited by: Kutub Inamdar
- Music by: Ajay–Atul
- Production companies: Zee Studios; Aatpat Production; Essel Vision Productions
- Distributed by: Zee Studios
- Release date: 29 April 2016
- Running time: 174 minutes
- Country: India
- Language: Marathi
- Budget: ₹4 crore
- Box office: est. ₹110 crore

Sairat (transl. Wild) is a 2016 Indian Marathi-language social romantic tragedy film directed and co-produced by Nagraj Manjule under his banner Aatpat Production, along with Nitin Keni and Nikhil Sane under Essel Vision Productions and Zee Studios. Starring Rinku Rajguru and Akash Thosar in their debuts, it tells the story of two young college students from different castes who fall in love, sparking conflict between their families.

Nagraj Manjule conceived the story in 2009, basing it on his experiences of caste discrimination, but scrapped it when he decided that it was boring. After making Fandry (2013), he revisited the story and completed its script the following year. The screenplay was written by Manjule, and his brother Bharat penned the dialogues. The film was shot in Manjule's village, Jeur in Karmala Taluka of Solapur district in Maharashtra. Sudhakar Reddy Yakkanti was the director of photography, and Kutub Inamdar edited the film.

Sairat premiered at the 66th Berlin International Film Festival, where it received a standing ovation. It was released on 29 April 2016 in Maharashtra and several other locations in India, receiving positive reviews from critics. The film grossed over ₹110 crore at the box office emerged as sleeper hit, and remained the highest-grossing Marathi film until it was surpassed by Raja Shivaji in 2026. Rajguru received the National Film Award – Special Mention at the 63rd National Film Awards. Sairat received 11 awards at the 2017 Filmfare Marathi Awards, including Best Film, Best Director (Manjule), Best Actress (Rajguru) and Best Music Album. Rajguru and Thosar won in the Best Debut female and male categories. The film was remade in several languages: Manasu Mallige (2017) in Kannada, Channa Mereya (2017) in Punjabi, Laila O Laila (2017) in Odia, Noor Jahaan (2018) in Bengali and Dhadak (2018) in Hindi.

== Plot ==
Prashant "Parshya" Kale is a talented lower-caste student and cricket captain whose father works as a local fisherman. He crosses paths with Archana "Archi" Patil, the headstrong, academically gifted daughter of a wealthy, upper-caste landlord and influential politician. Despite the rigid societal barriers separating them, the two fall deeply in love while attending college together and begin meeting in secret.

During a birthday celebration for Archi's younger brother, Prince, the couple is caught together in the family's backyard. Archi's powerful father, Tatya, brutally assaults Parshya and his friends. Realizing the imminent danger, the lovers attempt to elope but are quickly intercepted and detained by the local police. Tatya uses his political clout to force the authorities to file a fabricated gang-rape charge against Parshya and his companions. Defiant, Archi tears up the false complaint and demands their release. When Tatya's henchmen launch another violent assault on the boys, Archi snatches a pistol from one of the goons, holding them at gunpoint until Parshya and his friends are freed. She and Parshya then board a moving train, fleeing their hometown for Hyderabad.

Arriving in the city completely broke, the couple faces immediate hardship. Turned away from a local lodge due to lack of funds, they are forced to sleep at the railway station. One night, a group of predatory men rouse them under the guise of taking them to a police station. The encounter turns violent as the men attack Parshya and attempt to assault Archi. Suman Akka, a benevolent woman from a nearby slum, courageously intervenes and rescues the young couple from tragedy.

Suman Akka provides them with a modest shack in the slums and helps them find stability; Archi secures a job at a bottling factory, while Parshya assists Akka at her dosa stall. As they adjust, Archi struggles heavily with homesickness, language barriers, and the harsh realities of slum life, causing tension and bitter arguments between the couple. Following a particularly severe fight, Archi leaves for the railway station to go home. A distraught Parshya attempts suicide, but Archi, having a change of heart, returns just in time to save him. The two reconcile, legally marry at a registrar's office, and Archi soon becomes pregnant.

Years later, Parshya and Archi have achieved financial stability and moved into a comfortable apartment. Hoping to mend broken ties, Archi places a phone call to her mother, letting her young son, Aakash, speak to his grandmother. Shortly after the call, Prince and a few relatives arrive at the apartment, ostensibly offering gifts from Archi's mother as a gesture of family reconciliation. While little Aakash visits a neighbor, Archi and Parshya warmly welcome the visitors inside and serve them tea. The neighbor later brings Aakash back to the apartment, leaving him at the threshold. Walking inside, the young boy discovers the horrific sight of his parents' bloody bodies lying on the floor, brutally hacked to death in an act of honor killing.

== Cast ==
- Rinku Rajguru as Archana "Archi" Patil
- Akash Thosar as Prashant "Parshya" Kale
- Tanaji Galgunde as Pradeep Bansode (Langdya/Balya)
- Arbaz Shaikh as Salim Shaikh (Salya)
- Suresh Vishwakarma as Tatya, Archi's father
- Geeta Chavan as Archi's mother
- Jyoti Subhash as Saguna Aatya
- Chhaya Kadam as Suman Akka
- Anuja Muley as Annie
- Rubina Inamdar as Sapna
- Dhananjay Nanavare as Mangesh (Mangya)
- Suraj Pawar as Prince, Archi's younger brother
- Sambhaji Tangde as Parshya's father
- Vaibhavi Pardeshi as Parshya's mother
- Nagraj Manjule as a cricket commentator
- Pratik Kore as Parshya's Friend
- Bhushan Manjule as Shahi

== Production ==
=== Development ===
Writer-director Nagraj Manjule wrote Sairat as a "classic love story" and a "story of impossible love", based on his own experiences of caste discrimination. He chose his own village, Jeur in Karmala Taluka of Solapur district, Maharashtra as the setting. Over two years, Manjule worked on 50 drafts of the screenplay before "intuition took over as the muse". Manjule said that the film is about "the challenges of an inter-caste romance, but in a mainstream format." He had begun working on the story of Sairat in 2009, but left it after he found it "boring". After writing the script, he read it to his family and friends and saw how it "moved people". Manjule finished the script in December 2014. The dialogue was written by his brother, Bharat.

Manjule then directed Fandry (2013), which was also based on caste discrimination. While editing it, he came across the story of Sairat after he realised that many people did not watch Fandry because of its lack of songs, and decided to make a more commercial film. He said that he wrote the script after much deliberation: "I will tell my story, but I will tell it your way and then you will watch it." Manjule decided to tell the story from a woman's perspective, since he was "fed up of the male-dominated culture and the films" with a "muscular hero saving the damsel in distress". He added "colour" to the character, making her strong because he also wanted to address gender bias in society. Manjule made Archi do what men do, and made Parshya "sensible and capable", "imbibing good qualities of women in men." Several scenes, such as Parshya jumping into a well, were drawn from Manjule's life. He called the film's title self-explanatory that might imply "freedom of thought, liberation and progressive ideas" for some and "sheer wildness and recklessness" for others. According to Manjule, the film's "takeaway" is that "lovers shouldn't be subjected to violence."

=== Casting ===
Manjule chose students with no acting background for the lead roles. 15 year old Rinku Rajguru went with her mother to see Manjule shoot a film in Akluj, her village in Solapur district. Her mother knew him, since he is from Solapur. Rajguru was introduced to Manjule, and was asked to audition. She auditioned with dialogue and dancing, and was selected as the female lead. Manjule gave her a year to work on her personality. She played the role of Archana Patil, an upper-caste girl who is the daughter of a wealthy village politician. Twenty-year-old graduate student Akash Thosar was cast as Prashant Kale after he met Bharat Manjule at a railway station and showed him some of his photos. It was shown to Nagraj; Thosar was summoned for auditions and eventually selected for the role of a lower-caste fisherman's son. Tanaji Galgunde and Arbaz Shaikh played supporting roles in the film, and Manjule made a cameo appearance as a cricket commentator.

=== Filming ===
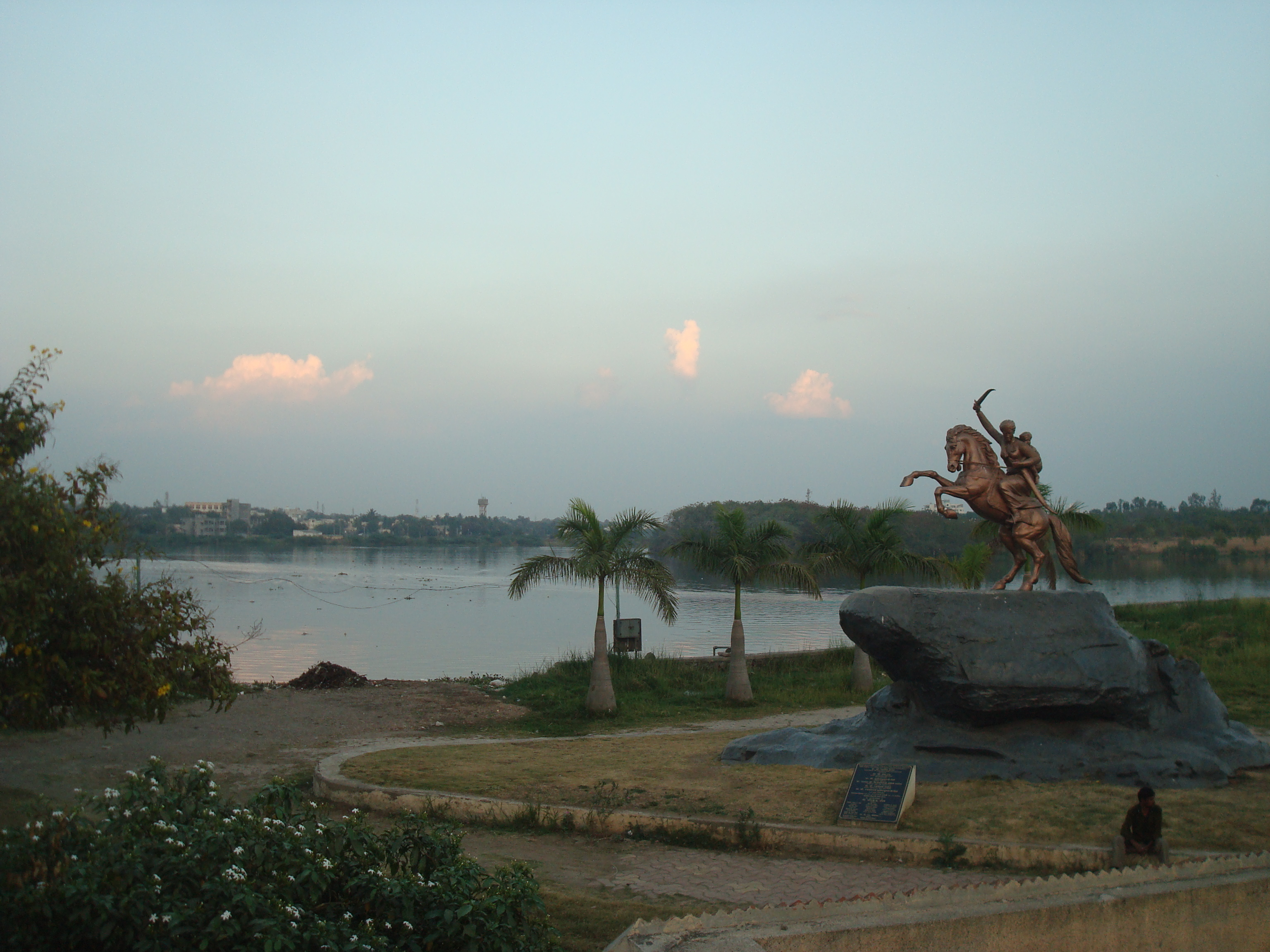
Sairat was filmed in Solapur.

Filming began in February 2014, and ended in May 2015; several portions were shot in Hyderabad. It took nearly 70 days for the entire shoot, unusually long for a Marathi film. Manjule cited the reasons being a "lot of locations, a huge number of characters and many complicated crowd scenes" in the film. Thosar had difficulty crying on cue during the audition, and was tense filming the crying scene. Rajguru and Thosar lived with Manjule at his home in Pune for two to three months before filming, where they would discuss the script and rehearse scenes daily. Manjule said that they did not use glycerine, and actually cried while filming the emotional scenes; he made them understand the "layers in their characters".

Manjule occasionally asked the actors what they would say they in a similar situation, prompting improvisation. The director of photography was Sudhakar Reddy Yakkanti and Kutub Inamdar served as the editor. Sairat was produced by Nagraj Manjule's AatPat Productions and Zee Studios. Rajguru, in grade 10, left school for the duration of filming. About the film's ending, Manjule said that he used silence to demonstrate that "two people who are in love and happy can die suddenly." He shot the ending without dialogue or background score, because he wanted "the violence in the scene to hit the audience." Thosar was a bodybuilder, and had to lose weight for the role. Rajguru lost 13 kilograms (29 lb), and worked on her voice for the role. Thosar said that he was like the character of Prashant. Rajguru admired Archana, and said that she was "inspired to be as dashing as Archie."

== Soundtrack ==
Sairat's songs and background score were composed and written by the Ajay–Atul duo, who previously associated with Manjule on Fandry. The four-song soundtrack includes Western classical music recorded at Sony Scoring Stage in Hollywood, California, a first for an Indian film. It was released on 1 April 2016 on the Zee Music Company label.

== Release ==
Sairat premiered at the 66th Berlin International Film Festival as a part of the Generation 14plus section, where it received a standing ovation. The jury was composed of teenagers. The film was released domestically on 29 April 2016 in about 200 screens. It was released with English subtitles in Maharashtra, Gujarat, Goa, Madhya Pradesh, Delhi, Kolkata, Bhilai, Raipur, Bhiwadi, Karnataka, and Telangana. The film screened at more than 450 theatres, over 50 of which were outside Maharashtra. Due to Sairat's popularity, additional shows at midnight and 3:00 am were introduced at a theatre in Rahimatpur in Satara district. The film was also screened at the India Habitat Centre Film Festival, the Brahmaputra Valley Film Festival, the International Film Festival of India and the Indian Film Festival in The Hague post its theatrical release. It was the first Marathi film released in the United Arab Emirates and South Korea.

In April, Manjule filed a complaint with the Mumbai Police after the film was leaked online two days before its theatrical release. The film had a watermark indicating that it was a censor copy, intended for censorship-board officials to review before release. In May 2016, a mobile-shop owner in Pune was arrested for piracy. Cybercrime police arrested a Byculla (Mumbai)-based cable operator for broadcasting the pirated version of Sairat on his network. The film was released on DVD on 1 September 2016, and is also available on Netflix.

The film is set to be re-released on 21 March 2025 in Maharashtra.

== Reception ==
=== Box office ===
Sairat earned ₹3.60 crore on its opening day at the box office. It earned ₹3.95 crore on its second day and ₹4.55 crore on its third day, with a total of ₹12.10 crore on its opening weekend. The film earned ₹25.50 crore in its first week. Its screen count was increased from 400 to 450 in the second week, earning an additional ₹15.61 crore. It earned a total of ₹41.11 crore in its second weekend. The film earned more than ₹65 crore in three weeks, and entered its fourth week at more than 525 screens. In addition to Maharashtra, it was released with subtitles in parts of Madhya Pradesh, Karnataka, Delhi and Goa. Sairat also did well on the overseas market. It earned a total of ₹14.58 lakh (US$15,000) at the US box office in four weeks. It grossed ₹80 crore in five weeks. The film earned ₹82.95 crore in Maharashtra. Made on a budget of ₹4 crore, Sairat earned a total of ₹110 crore at the end of its theatrical run and was the highest-grossing Marathi film until it was surpassed by the 2026 film Raja Shivaji.

=== Critical response ===
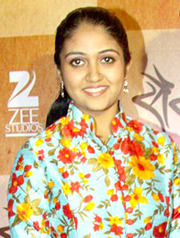
Rajguru's performance was particularly praised by critics.

Sairat received critical acclaim, with particular praise for Rajguru's performance. Meenakshi Shedde of Forbes India called the film "one of the great triumphs of Indian cinema this year", and a rare example of an "Indian director addressing caste issues from first-hand, lived experience, as distinct from that of a privileged, if empathetic, director." Pratik Ghosh of Daily News and Analysis called it a "gem" which "enriched Marathi cinema". He praised Rajguru: "Sairat's remarkable find is the dusky Rinku Rajguru who is sterling as the fearless Archi." Mihir Bhanage gave a positive review: "The film can be divided into two parts; the first one, a dream and the second one, reality and both strike a chord. But the masterstroke of Manjule the story-teller and director, is the climax."

Harish Wankhede in his review in Tehelka called the film 'a radical entry in the populist-fantasy ‘love story’ genre. However he argues that from the very beginning of the film, the female character takes a dynamic lead and gives the story a feminist-heroic tilt. Archi's courage and power is more male-like, vocal and aggressive than Parshya and his two friends. Her heroic posturing and confident outlook make her the lead hero of the film while pushing others to the periphery as dependent characters. The director allows Archi's character to break the stereotypes of a village girl but on the other hand asserts the power of her feudal-upper caste lineage. However, similar considerations are partially applied to her counterpart Dalit characters.

Ganesh Matkari of Pune Mirror described the film as "significant", and not easy to "make or to grasp". Matkari expressed reservations about its length. Divya Unny from OPEN wrote: "The three-hour-long film draws the audience in with plenty of songs and slow-mos, emotion and drama, and then serves us reality right when we aren’t expecting it." Suprateek Chatterjee of HuffPost described it as "soaring" and "gut-wrenching", defying convention "even while sticking to established tropes". J. Hurtado of ScreenAnarchy called the film a "singular, astonishing, breathtaking achievement": "You owe it to yourself to experience the beauty, exhaltation, and pain that Sairat has to offer". Sowmya Rajendran of The News Minute cited it as a "brave film that gets to the root of the matter": "It could have been just another film made on the subject of forbidden teenage love but the maturity with which Nagraj Manjule has crafted his characters and narrative is breath-taking." Uday Bhatia of Mint compared the film to Michael Haneke's Funny Games; "both derive their sting from the way they play with audience expectations—raising hopes, dashing them, then raising them again."

Shweta Parande of India.com called Rajguru's performance "impressive". Rochona Majumdar of The Indian Express wrote a positive review: "To describe it as a story of inter-caste love that ends brutally would be to do grave injustice to Manjule’s portrayal of a slice of contemporary India." Suhas Bhasme of The Wire noted that Sairat positions the issues of "caste discrimination and caste-based violence centre stage, which have often been denied or overlooked by mainstream Marathi movies." Baradwaj Rangan called the film a master class in "how to make the audience laugh, cry, swoon, eat out of your hand": "Sairat talks not just about the realities of caste and class, but of gender too." According to Ranjib Mazumdar of The Quint, the film refreshingly changes gender roles with its strong female character: "[Archie] is like a body of free water, unaware of limits and customs, flowing with a convinced passion we rarely see in our heroines." S. Shivakumar of The Hindu gave the film a positive review, praising Rajguru's performance and Manjule's direction: "Nagraj excels in making the dramatic scenes look realistic, effortlessly manipulating your emotions."

=== Awards and nominations ===
Award	Category	Recipient(s) and nominee(s)	Result	Ref.
Filmfare Awards Marathi	Best Film	Sairat	Won	
Filmfare Awards Marathi	Best Director	Nagraj Manjule	Won	
Filmfare Awards Marathi	Best Actor	Akash Thosar	Nominated	
Filmfare Awards Marathi	Best Male Debut	Akash Thosar	Won	
Filmfare Awards Marathi	Best Actress	Rinku Rajguru	Won	
Filmfare Awards Marathi	Best Female Debut	Rinku Rajguru	Won	
Filmfare Awards Marathi	Best Supporting Actor	Tanaji Galgunde	Nominated	
Filmfare Awards Marathi	Best Supporting Actress	Chhaya Kadam	Nominated	
Filmfare Awards Marathi	Best Music Director	Ajay–Atul	Won	
Filmfare Awards Marathi	Best Lyricist	Ajay–Atul – ("Yad Lagla")	Won	
Filmfare Awards Marathi	Best Playback Singer – Male	Ajay Gogavale – ("Yad Lagla")	Won	
Filmfare Awards Marathi	Best Playback Singer – Male	Ajay–Atul – ("Zingaat")	Nominated	
Filmfare Awards Marathi	Best Playback Singer – Female	Chinmayi – ("Sairat Zaala Ji")	Won	
Filmfare Awards Marathi	Best Playback Singer – Female	Shreya Ghoshal – ("Aatach Baya")	Nominated	
Filmfare Awards Marathi	Best Story	Nagraj Manjule	Nominated	
Filmfare Awards Marathi	Best Screenplay	Nagraj Manjule	Nominated	
Filmfare Awards Marathi	Best Dialogue	Nagraj Manjule, Bharat Manjule	Won	
Filmfare Awards Marathi	Best Editing	Kutub Inamdar	Nominated	
Filmfare Awards Marathi	Best Choreography	Nagraj Manjule – ("Zingaat")	Nominated	
Filmfare Awards Marathi	Best Cinematography	Sudhakar Yekkanti Reddy	Nominated	
Filmfare Awards Marathi	Best Sound Design	Avinash Sonawane	Won	
Filmfare Awards Marathi	Best Background Score	Ajay–Atul	Won	
Mirchi Music Awards Marathi	Album of the Year	Sairat	Won	
Mirchi Music Awards Marathi	Song of the Year	"Yad Lagla"	Won	
Mirchi Music Awards Marathi	Male Vocalist of the Year	Ajay Gogavale – ("Yad Lagla")	Won	
Mirchi Music Awards Marathi	Composer of the Year	Ajay–Atul – ("Sairat Zaala Ji")	Won	
Mirchi Music Awards Marathi	Programmer and Arranger of the Year	Ajay–Atul – ("Yad Lagla")	Won	
Mirchi Music Awards Marathi	Song Recording and Mixing of the Year	Vijay Dayal – ("Sairat Zaala Ji")	Won	
National Film Awards	Special Mention – Best Actress	Rinku Rajguru	Won	

== Home media ==
Sairat was premiered first on Zee Marathi on the occasion of Gandhi Jayanti (2 October 2016), that was preceded with a promotional interview Chat with Sairat Stars, featuring the lead cast and director, broadcast before the premiere. According to the Broadcast Audience Research Council, Sairat garnered a TRP rating of 13.74 and ranked at the first place for the week of 1–7 October 2016; the promotional television show also ranked on the second place with a rating of 4.31. It is currently available on ZEE5.

== Remakes ==
After Sairat's success, the film was remade in several Indian languages. Its first remake was the Punjabi film Channa Mereya (2017), directed by Pankaj Batra. It received mixed reviews from critics. Rinku Rajguru reprised her role in the Kannada version, entitled Manasu Mallige (2017). The Odia version, Laila O Laila (2017) was directed by Susant Mani. The film was also remade in Bengali (a Bangladesh-India joint venture) as Noor Jahaan (2018), directed by Abhimanyu Mukherjee. The Hindi remake, Dhadak (directed by Shashank Khaitan and produced by Karan Johar), was released on 20 July 2018. As of July 2016, Rockline Venkatesh held the remake rights for Tamil, Telugu and Malayalam-language films.

Year	Film	Language	Cast	Director	Notes
2016	Sairat	Marathi	Akash Thosar, Rinku Rajguru	Nagraj Manjule	Original
2017	Manasu Mallige	Kannada	Rinku Rajguru, Nishanth	S. Narayan	Remake
2017	Channa Mereya	Punjabi	Ninja, Payal Rajput, Amrit Maan	Pankaj Batra	Remake
2017	Laila O Laila	Odia	Swaraj Barik, Sunmeera	Sushant Mani	Remake
2018	Noor Jahan	Bengali	Adrit Roy, Puja Cherry, Aparajita Adhya	Abhimanyu Mukherjee	Remake
2018	Dhadak	Hindi	Ishaan Khatter, Janhvi Kapoor	Shashank Khaitan	Remake

== Impact ==
According to Smitha Verma of The Financial Express, Sairat was a turning point for the Marathi film industry which restored faith in distributors of regional cinema. Its lead actors, Rinku Rajguru and Akash Thosar, became overnight celebrities; in January 2017, the Election Commission of India made them brand ambassadors for National Voters' Day to encourage citizens to vote. In addition, Karmala, where the film was shot, was visited by nearly 20,000 tourists within three weeks of its release.

Furthermore, upon release, Sairat caused a major shift in societal values, mainly due to the content of love marriages crossing the lines of caste. Three family reconciliations were reported in Mumbai after the film's release, including that of Sachin Lokhande (who married a Muslim girl and waited 12 years for both families to agree). His parents approved his marriage after watching Sairat. Several fans of the film formed the Sairat Marriage Group, an organisation with nearly 100 volunteers across Maharashtra, to help runaway couples.
