= Nagraj Manjule =

Indian film director (born 1978)

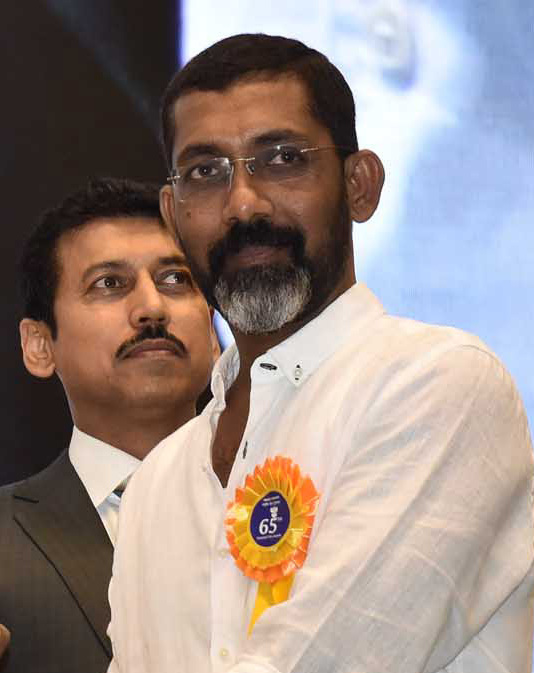
- Manjule at the 65th National Film Awards Function in New Delhi
- Born: Nagraj Popatrao Manjule; 24 August 1978 (age 48); Jeur, Maharashtra, India
- Occupations: Actor; director; producer; poet; scriptwriter
- Spouse(s): Sunita Manjule (m. 1997; div. 2014) Gargee Kulkarni (m. 2017)
- Children: 2
- Awards: National Film Award, First Non-Feature Film 2010 Pistulya; Indira Gandhi Award, Best Debut Film 2013 Fandry

Nagraj Popatrao Manjule (born 24 August 1978) is an Indian film director, actor, producer, scriptwriter, poet, screenwriter, and filmmaker. He works in Marathi cinema, and is best known for Sairat and Pistulya—the latter for which he received National Film Award in the National Film Award for Best Debut Film of a Director (non-feature film). He made his Hindi Cinema debut in 2022, with a film called Jhund, starring Amitabh Bachchan.

At the 61st National Film Awards, Fandry won the Indira Gandhi Award for Best Debut Film of a Director. In 2018, Manjule published a book of poetry in Marathi titled Unhachya Katavirudhha which won the Bhairuratan Damani Sahitya Puraskar.

== Early life and education ==
Manjule grew up in Jeur village in the Solapur district of Maharashtra. Baburao Manjule, who is the brother of Nagraj's father Popatrao Manjule, adopted Nagraj due to financial hardships. However, Nagraj decided early on that if he achieved anything significant, he would honor his biological father, Popatrao Manjule. Since starting his career in the film industry, he has been known by the name 'Nagraj Popatrao Manjule' in all his professional endeavors. He belongs to the traditionally-nomadic Waddar community, a Dravidian tribe.

He earned his M.A. in Marathi literature from Savitribai Phule Pune University, followed by a master's in communication studies from New Arts, Science and Commerce College, Ahmednagar.

== Career ==
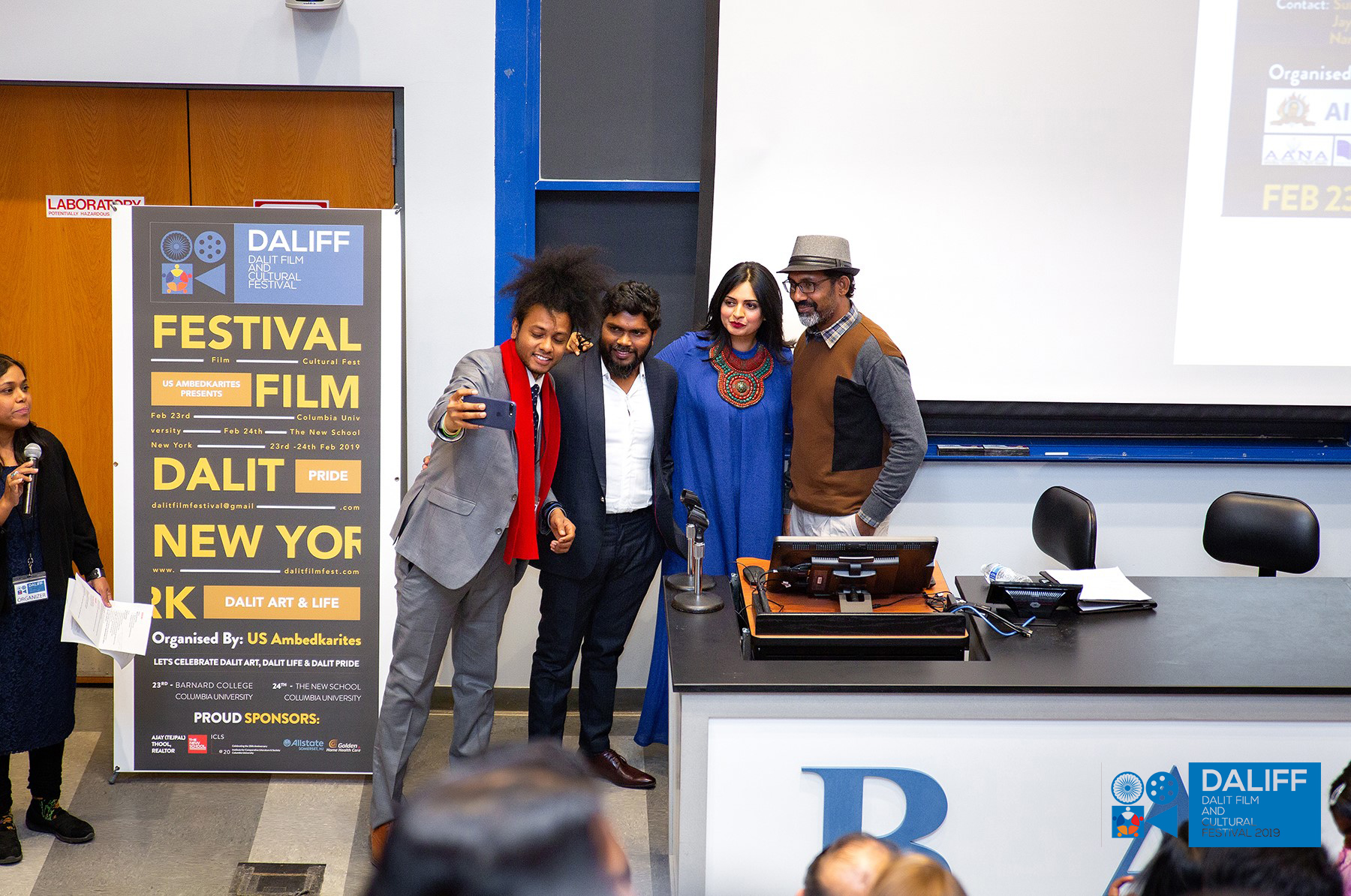
(L to R) Suraj Yengde, Pa. Ranjith, Niharika Singh, and Nagraj Manjule taking a selfie at the Dalit Film Festival in New York City, USA in 2019.

Manjule is strongly inspired by B. R. Ambedkar, the emancipator of downtrodden and the drafting chairman of the Constitution of India. His films are deeply rooted in his own experience growing up as a Dalit in rural Maharashtra. His films have focused on the plights faced by members of these communities, including social discrimination at the hands of high-caste communities as well as the resulting economic hardships.

His first National Award-winning short film Pistulya is a reflection of his 'felt experience'. The film focuses on the desire of a Dalit boy to attend school, and his inability to do so because of his family's poverty and a deep-seated disdain for formal education within his community.

His debut feature film, Fandry, was released in February 2014; the word means "pig" in the Kaikadi language, which is a metaphor for the dehumanizing treatment of the Dalit community in rural India. This film also addresses caste discrimination. This film won the Indira Gandhi Award for Best Debut Film of a Director.

Manjule's second film, Sairat, premiered at the 66th Berlin International Film Festival. Like Fandry and Pistulya, it deals with caste discrimination and honour killing, a practice still widespread in parts of India. Sairat also seeks to address the role of women in society, with the character of Archie (Archana Patil), the female protagonist of Sairat, garnering both popular and critical acclaim. Sairat is one-off the highest grossing Marathi film of all time. In 2019, Manjule hosted Marathi Kaun Banega Crorepati. Manjule made his directorial debut in Hindi films with Jhund starring Amitabh Bachchan.

In 2023, Manjule appeared in Ghar Banduk Biryani, playing the role of a police officer. This film marked his first collaboration with Sayaji Shinde and his third with Akash Thosar.

== Filmography ==
=== Film ===
Key
†	Denotes films that have not yet been released

- All films are in Marathi, unless mentioned.

Year	Film	Actor	Director	Writer	Producer	Role	Notes	Ref.
2010	Pistulya	Yes	Yes	Yes	Yes	Ambadas	National Film Award for Best First Non-Feature Film of a Director	
2013	Fandry	Yes	Yes	Yes	No	Chankeshwar "Chankya" Sathe	Indira Gandhi Award for Best Debut Film of a Director	
2015	Baji	Yes	No	No	No	Inspector Mahesh		
2015	Highway	Yes	No	No	No			
2016	Sairat	Yes	Yes	Yes	Yes	Cricket commentator	Selected For 66th Berlin International Film Festival	
2016	The Silence	Yes	No	No	No	Uncle		
2018	Pavsacha Nibandh	No	Yes	Yes	Yes		Short film	
2018	Naal	Yes	No	No	Yes	Chaitya's father	Indira Gandhi Award for Best Debut Film of a Director	
2020	Taar	Yes	No	No	No	Postman	Short film	
2022	Unpaused: Naya Safar	Yes	Yes	Yes	Yes		Hindi film	
2022	Jhund	Yes	Yes	Yes	Yes	Hitler Bhai	Hindi film (Bollywood Debut)	
2023	Ghar Banduk Biryani	Yes	No	Yes	Yes	Raya Patil	Dubbed in Hindi, Tamil, Telugu	
2023	Naal 2	Yes	No	No	Yes	Chaitya's father		
2026	Frame	Yes	No	No	Yes	Chandu Pansare		
2027	Khashaba †	Yes	Yes	Yes	Yes		Based on K.D. Jadhav	
TBA	Macho †	No	No	No	Yes			

=== Television ===
Year	Title	Language	Notes	Ref.
2026	Matka King	Hindi	Prime Video series	

== Personal life ==
Manjule was married to Sunita Manjule in 1997 when he studied in 12th, but later divorced on November 10, 2014. He gave Sunita ₹7 lakh as permanent alimony. It was revealed that the allegations were false and Manjule found innocent. In 2017, Manjule married Gargi Kulkarni and has two children Raya and Shahu.

== Books ==
- Unhachya Kataviruddha – poetry.

== Awards ==
Year	Awards	Categories	Work	Result	Ref.
2010	58th National Film Awards	Best First Non-Feature Film	Pistulya	Won	
2013	61st National Film Awards	Best Debut Film of a Director	Fandry	Won	
2014	1st Filmfare Awards Marathi	Best Director	Fandry	Won	
2017	65th National Film Awards	Best Director in Non-Feature Film	Pavsacha Nibandh	Won	
2017	Maharashtracha Favourite Kon?	Favourite Director	Sairat	Won	
2017	3rd Filmfare Awards Marathi	Best Director	Sairat	Won	
2017	Zee Chitra Gaurav Puraskar	Best Director	Sairat	Won	
2019	66th National Film Awards	Best Debut Film of a Director	Naal	Won	
2022	Maharashtracha Favourite Kon?	Favourite Director of the Decade	Sairat	Won	
2023	Fakt Marathi Cine Sanman	Fakt Marathi Cine Sanman for Best Actor in a Lead Role	Ghar Banduk Biryani	Won	
2023	14th MFK Awards	Favourite Supporting Actor	Naal 2	Won	
2023	14th MFK Awards	Favourite Actor	Ghar Banduk Biryani	Nominated	
2017	3rd Filmfare Awards Marathi	Filmfare Award for Best Screenplay – Marathi	Sairat	Nominated	
2017	3rd Filmfare Awards Marathi	Filmfare Award for Best Story – Marathi	Sairat	Nominated	
