= Kitchen Kallakar =

Indian television cookery game show

- Genre: Cookery game show
- Starring: See below
- Country of origin: India
- Original language: Marathi
- No. of episodes: 65

Production
- Producer: Parth Shah
- Camera setup: Multi-camera
- Running time: 45 minutes
- Production company: Endemol Shine Group

Original release
- Network: Zee Marathi
- Release: 15 December 2021 – 14 July 2022

Kitchen Kallakar is an Indian Marathi language television cookery game show which premiered from 15 December 2021 aired on Zee Marathi. It was hosted by Sankarshan Karhade and judged by Prashant Damle.

== Cast ==
- Hosted by :- Sankarshan Karhade, Shreya Bugade
- Judged by :- Prashant Damle, Nirmiti Sawant
- Rajchef :- Jayanti Kathale, Madhura Bachal
- Sheth of Peth :- Pranav Raorane

== Contestants ==
| Episodes | Guests | Recipe | Winner | Prize |
|---|---|---|---|---|
| 1 | Tejaswini Pandit | Pakatale Chirote | Prarthana Behere | Refrigerator |
| 1 | Adinath Kothare | Ukdiche Modak | Prarthana Behere | Refrigerator |
| 1 | Prarthana Behere | Puran poli | Prarthana Behere | Refrigerator |
| 2 | Akash Thosar | Kothimbir Wadi | Sonalee Kulkarni | Oven |
| 2 | Sonalee Kulkarni | Misal pav | Sonalee Kulkarni | Oven |
| 2 | Nagraj Manjule | Thalipeeth | Sonalee Kulkarni | Oven |
| 3 | Jaywant Wadkar | Sawji Chicken | Anand Ingale | Television |
| 3 | Vandana Gupte | Vangyache Bharit | Anand Ingale | Television |
| 3 | Anand Ingale | Fansachi Bhaji | Anand Ingale | Television |
| 4 | Usha Nadkarni | Pudachi Vadi | Usha Nadkarni | Dishwasher |
| 4 | Bharat Ganeshpure | Bread Pakoda | Usha Nadkarni | Dishwasher |
| 4 | Shreya Bugde | Kanda Bhaji | Usha Nadkarni | Dishwasher |
| 5 | Abhijeet Sawant | Narayndas Ladoo | Abhijeet Sawant | Dishwasher |
| 5 | Aditi Sarangdhar | Telpoli | Abhijeet Sawant | Dishwasher |
| 5 | Subodh Bhave | Kanole | Abhijeet Sawant | Dishwasher |
| 6 | Sandeep Pathak | Tilgul | Sandeep Pathak | Gas Stove |
| 6 | Mrinal Kulkarni | Tilache Gajak & Tilpapadi | Sandeep Pathak | Gas Stove |
| 6 | Vijay Patkar | Tilachi Bhakari & Tilacha Bharit | Sandeep Pathak | Gas Stove |
| 7-8 | Pankaja Munde | Chicken curry | Pankaja Munde | Refrigerator |
| 7-8 | Rohit Pawar | Tea & Kanda Pohay | Pankaja Munde | Refrigerator |
| 7-8 | Praniti Shinde | Usal & Bhakri | Pankaja Munde | Refrigerator |
| 9 | Vaishali Made | Ragda pattice | Mugdha Vaishampayan | Electric Chimney |
| 9 | Saleel Kulkarni | Dahi vada | Mugdha Vaishampayan | Electric Chimney |
| 9 | Mugdha Vaishampayan | Paratha | Mugdha Vaishampayan | Electric Chimney |
| 10 | Vaibhav Tatwawadi | Prawns Biryani | Santosh Juvekar | Oven |
| 10 | Shruti Marathe | Bangada Fry | Santosh Juvekar | Oven |
| 10 | Santosh Juvekar | Ukad Shengale | Santosh Juvekar | Oven |
| 11 | Makarand Deshpande | Gulpoli | Makarand Deshpande | Refrigerator |
| 11 | Shweta Shinde | Bhogichi Bhaji & Tilachi Vadi | Makarand Deshpande | Refrigerator |
| 11 | Devdatta Nage | Shengapoli | Makarand Deshpande | Refrigerator |
| 12 | Mrunmayee Deshpande | Puran Karanji | Mrunmayee Deshpande | Gas Stove |
| 12 | Bhalchandra Kadam | Chakali | Mrunmayee Deshpande | Gas Stove |
| 12 | Kartiki Gaikwad | Matar Kachori | Mrunmayee Deshpande | Gas Stove |
| 13 | Siddharth Jadhav | Tambda- Pandhra Rassa | Siddharth Jadhav | Food Processor |
| 13 | Sayali Sanjeev | Chicken Sagoti | Siddharth Jadhav | Food Processor |
| 13 | Suyash Tilak | Paplet Fry | Siddharth Jadhav | Food Processor |
| 14 | Ujjwal Nikam | Jalebi | Krishna Prakash | Gas Stove |
| 14 | Rahi Sarnobat | Palak Puri& Gul Papdi | Krishna Prakash | Gas Stove |
| 14 | Krishna Prakash | Kheer | Krishna Prakash | Gas Stove |
| 15 | Lalit Prabhakar | Masurche Pedve | Vaidehi Parshurami | Refrigerator |
| 15 | Vaidehi Parshurami | Mutton Pattice | Vaidehi Parshurami | Refrigerator |
| 15 | Amey Wagh | Pav Bhaji | Vaidehi Parshurami | Refrigerator |
| 16 | Swara Joshi | Biscuit Ladoo & Kokam Sherbet | Vedashree Khadilkar | Tablet |
| 16 | Myra Vaikul | Beetroot Pattice & Limboo Sherbet | Vedashree Khadilkar | Tablet |
| 16 | Vedashree Khadilkar | Pohay & Taak | Vedashree Khadilkar | Tablet |
| 17 | Siddharth Jadhav | Anarse | Sayaji Shinde | Dishwasher |
| 17 | Vaidehi Parshurami | Santra Barfi | Sayaji Shinde | Dishwasher |
| 17 | Sayaji Shinde | Shirwale | Sayaji Shinde | Dishwasher |
| 18-19 | Mahesh Manjrekar | Rava-Besan Ladoo | Gauri Ingawale | Refrigerator |
| 18-19 | Gauri Ingawale | Doodhi Halwa | Gauri Ingawale | Refrigerator |
| 18-19 | Vidyadhar Joshi | Bhoplyache Gharge | Gauri Ingawale | Refrigerator |
| 20-21 | Amruta Fadnavis | Kombdi Vade | Amruta Fadnavis | Refrigerator |
| 20-21 | Swapnil Bandodkar | Matan Handi | Amruta Fadnavis | Refrigerator |
| 20-21 | Smita Jaykar | Sungatache Human | Amruta Fadnavis | Refrigerator |
| 22 | Rukmini Sutar | Golabhat & Chinchani | Asmita Deshmukh | Dishwasher |
| 22 | Kiran Gaikwad | Vadabhat & Mattha | Asmita Deshmukh | Dishwasher |
| 22 | Asmita Deshmukh | Masalebhat & Kadhi | Asmita Deshmukh | Dishwasher |
| 23 | Pushkar Shrotri | Nakhulyachi Kheer | Priyadarshan Jadhav | Refrigerator |
| 23 | Anita Date-Kelkar | Gulshel | Priyadarshan Jadhav | Refrigerator |
| 23 | Priyadarshan Jadhav | Gajar Halwa | Priyadarshan Jadhav | Refrigerator |
| 24-25 | Jhund Team | Jowar Bhakari & Bharleli Bhendi | Jhund Team | Dishwasher |
| 24-25 | Sairat Team | Tandlachi Bhakari & Bharli Karali | Jhund Team | Dishwasher |
| 24-25 | Fandry Team | Bajari Bhakari & Bharli Vangi | Jhund Team | Dishwasher |
| 26 | Rohini Hattangadi | Suka Mutton | Rohini Hattangadi | Refrigerator |
| 26 | Kushal Badrike | Malwani Chicken | Rohini Hattangadi | Refrigerator |
| 26 | Meghana Erande | Khekda Masala | Rohini Hattangadi | Refrigerator |
| 27 | Vinamra Babhal | Ghawan & Hirwi Chutney | Vinamra Babhal | Water Purifier |
| 27 | Hruta Durgule | Dhirda & Khobra Chutney | Vinamra Babhal | Water Purifier |
| 27 | Ajinkya Raut | Panagi & Chinch Chutney | Vinamra Babhal | Water Purifier |
| 28 | Gashmeer Mahajani | Patwady | Gashmeer Mahajani | Dishwasher |
| 28 | Spruha Joshi | Maswadi | Gashmeer Mahajani | Dishwasher |
| 28 | Sudesh Bhosale | Shevbhaji | Gashmeer Mahajani | Dishwasher |
| 29 | Isha Keskar | Sheera | Isha Keskar | Electric Chimney |
| 29 | Kranti Redkar | Motichoor Ladoo | Isha Keskar | Electric Chimney |
| 29 | Girija Oak | Shrikhand Vadi | Isha Keskar | Electric Chimney |

== Seasons ==
| Season | Episodes | Originally Broadcast | | Name | Ref. |
| Season | Episodes | First aired | Last aired | Name | Ref. |
|---|---|---|---|---|---|
| 1 | 29 | 15 December 2021 | 12 March 2022 | Mast Majedar Kitchen Kallakar | |
| 2 | 36 | 16 March 2022 | 14 July 2022 | Masaledar Kitchen Kallakar | |

=== Special episode ===
- 9 January 2022
