= Asmita (TV series) =

2014 Indian Marathi-language crime series

- Genre: Mystery; Crime; Drama
- Directed by: Sangeet Kulkarni
- Starring: See below
- Country of origin: India
- Original language: Marathi
- No. of seasons: 2
- No. of episodes: 468

Production
- Producer: Ruhi Films
- Production locations: Mumbai, Maharashtra, India
- Camera setup: Multi-camera
- Running time: 45 minutes

Original release
- Network: Zee Marathi
- Release: 5 February 2014 – 13 January 2017

Asmita is an Indian Marathi language crime show which aired on Zee Marathi. It starred Mayuri Wagh, Yogesh Sohoni, Ashwini Mahangade, Raju Athawale, Yatin Karyekar, Pooja Pawar, Piyush Ranade, Sulabha Deshpande and Ajay Purkar.

== Plot ==
It is a story of Asmita, a private detective lady, where she solve crime cases with her partners.

== Cast ==
=== Main ===
- Mayuri Wagh as Asmita Prabhakar Agnihotri / Asmita Abhiman Saranjame
  - Jui Bhagwat as Child Asmita Agnihotri
- Piyush Ranade as Abhiman Dadasaheb Saranjame

=== Asmita's Assistants ===
- Yogesh Sohoni as Siddheshwar Patwardhan (Sid)
- Ashwini Mahangade as Manali Patil (Manakka)
- Vikas Patil as Bandoji Naik (Bandu)
- Raju Athawale as Dajiba Ghorpade (Daji)

=== Asmita's Family ===
- Yatin Karyekar as Prabhakar Agnihotri - Asmita, Subodh and Purva's father, Asha's husband
- Pooja Pawar / Shama Ninave as Asha Prabhakar Agnihotri
- Dhanashree Satam as Purva Agnihotri
- Unknown as Subodh Agnihotri
- Unknown as Vishaka Subodh Agnihotri - Subodh's wife

=== Abhimaan's Family ===
- Sulabha Deshpande as Abhiman's grandmother
- Ajay Purkar as Amrut (Dadasaheb) Saranjame - Abhiman and Vaidehi's father
- Leekha Mukund / Shaila Kanekar as Anuradha Saranjame - Abhiman and Vaidehi's mother
- Amruta Deshmukh as Vaidehi Saranjame - Abhiman's sister
- Unknown as Keshav Kaka
- Vinod Shinde as Pandhari - Saranjame's Servant
- Kavita Amarjeet as Radha - Saranjame's Maid

=== Others ===
- Jaywant Pandurang Wadkar as Wadkar - Prabhakar's Assistant
- Gayatri Soham / Sayali Joshi as Inspector Shikha, Asmita's friend
- Sameer Vijayan as ACP Jayesh Sawant
- Sneha Chavan / Ketaki Palav as Rashmi - Abhiman's ex-fiancé
- Siddhi Karkhanis as Vrunda Mahadik - Angad's daughter
- Pankaj Vishnu as Bhuvan
- Abhidnya Bhave as Tanaya Patil - Bhuvan's ex-fiancé
- Sanjay Borkar as Nishad Andhare
- Unknown as Surendra Vategaonkar (V. Surendra)
- Hrudaynath Rane as Angad Mahadik (Raju Dada)
- Mayur Khandage as Indrajeet Mukadam (Jeet Sir)
- Raseek Raj as Inspector Mohite
- Mandar Devasthali as Naagesh Rao
- Jyotsna Wilson Dass as Mhatre Bai - Asmita's favorite school teacher

=== Guest Appearances ===
- Nikhil Raut (Ep 1)
- Shilpa Tulaskar as Swati Karkhanis (Ep 4)
- Sanskruti Balgude as Mukta Sabnis / Janhavi Purandare (Ep 8)
- Vikas Patil as Akshay Sabnis (Ep 8)
- Anshuman Vichare as Shekhar Shinde (Ep 43)
- Pushkar Shrotri as Sahil Poddar (Ep 46)
- Suruchi Adarkar as Rashmi (Ep 34)
- Poorvi Bhave as Anjali (Ep 34)
- Jayant Savarkar as Vishnukant Ramchandra Bhatavde (Anna) (Ep 65)
- Hemangi Kavi as Pallavi Kerkar (Ep 70)
- Pradip Velankar and Smita Oak as Mr. and Mrs. Samant (Ep 71)
- Veena Jagtap as Kshaama (Ep 72)
- Vidya Karanjikar and Prasad Jawade as Sheetal Deshpande and Pancham Deshpande (Ep 83)
- Gaurav Ghatnekar as Vikram (Ep 88)
- Snehalata Vasaikar as Amruta Birje (Ep 89)
- Madhav Abhyankar (Ep 94)
- Makarand Deshpande as Deshmukh Saaheb (Ep 97) - Secretary of Home Minster
- Shreya Bugade as Vaidehi Kirtane (Ep 98)
- Atul Parchure as Harshal (Ep 111)
- Apurva Nemlekar as Tanishqa (Ep 127)
- Manoj Kolhatkar as Raghunath Karnik
- Avinash Narkar and Aishwarya Narkar as Girish and Uma (Ep 179)
- Rutuja Bagwe as Shalaka (Ep 185)
- Sharvani Pillai as Archana Mhatre (Ep 190) / Poonam Ji (Ep 395)
- Reshma Shinde as Meghana (Ep 197)
- Sanjay Shejwal as Ninad (Ep 200)
- Astad Kale and Neha Shitole as Manoj Padhye and Neeta Padhye (Ep 206)
- Shubhangi Gokhale as Goda Patil
- Shubhangi Joshi as Aaji (Ep 225)
- Sayali Deodhar as Swati Sudhir Achrekar (Ep 227)
- Sankarshan Karhade as Salil (Ep 238)
- Madhav Abhyankar, Suhita Thatte (Vasanti), Rohan Gujar, Saksham Kulkarni (Ep 240)
- Minal Bal as Lady Constable Shalaka Rane (Ep 244)
- Hardeek Joshi as Shaunak (Ep 142) / Rajan Ambekar (Ep 259)
- Madhugandha Kulkarni as Madhuri Pradhan, Sagar Talashikar (Ep 291)
- Sharvari Lohokare as Pallavi Dharap (Ep 299)
- Deepti Lele as Devi (Ep 347)
- Mandar Devasthali as himself (Ep 347)

== Reception ==
=== Seasons ===
1. Asmita Shodhala Ki Sapadtacha (5 February 2014)
2. Asmita Gunhyala Mafi Nahi (20 January 2016)

=== Ratings ===
Week	Year	BARC Viewership		Ref.
Week	Year	TRP	Rank	Ref.
Week 28	2015	0.5	5	
Week 28	2016	1.5	5	

=== Airing history ===
No.	Airing Date	Days	Time (IST)
1	5 February – 24 May 2014	Wed-Sat	9.30 pm
2	28 May 2014 – 13 January 2017	Wed-Fri	9.30 pm (1 hour)

== Awards ==
Zee Marathi Utsav Natyancha Awards 2014
Category	Recipient	Role	Ref.
Best Character Female	Mayuri Wagh	Asmita Agnihotri	

== Adaptations ==
Language	Title	Original release	Network(s)	Last aired	Notes
Marathi	Asmita अस्मिता	5 February 2014	Zee Marathi	14 January 2017	Original
Bengali	Goyenda Ginni গোয়েন্দা গিন্নি	7 September 2015	Zee Bangla	25 December 2016	Remake
Kannada	Pattedari Pratibha ಪಟ್ಟೇದರಿ ಪ್ರತಿಭಾ	3 April 2017	Zee Kannada	28 May 2018	Remake
