= Gaurav More =

Indian actor

- Born: 30 January 1987 (age 39); Powai, Maharashtra, India
- Education: S. K. Somaiya College, Mumbai
- Occupations: Actor; comedian
- Years active: 2009–present
- Spouse: Priyanka Karekar (m. 2026)

Gaurav More is an Indian actor known for his work in the Marathi-language television show Maharashtrachi Hasyajatra. He appeared as supporting actor in several notable Marathi and Hindi films such as Balkadu (2015), Sanju (2018), and Vicky Velingkar (2019)

== Early life ==
Gaurav More was born in the slums of Filterpada, Powai, Mumbai. He is a Buddhist. Gaurav More shared that he faced financial struggles early in his career, living in challenging conditions across several areas including Ulhasnagar, Vithalwadi, Kalyan, and Bhandup. Eventually settling in Filterpada, he recalled the difficulty of managing water seepage during monsoons, which required constant effort from the family.

== Career ==
Along with attending one-act festivals, he studied at S. K. Somaiya College, Ambedkar College in Mumbai and finally CKT College Panvel. In addition, he was performing in the drama "Jalu Bai Halu" as an actor Ananda Karekar's stand-in. Gaurav began contributing to Prasad Khandekar's one-act play "Padadyaaad" when he was working on this drama, for which he was acknowledged. As a result of their bonding, Gaurav began performing in plays and sketches that Prasad Khandekar wrote.

He made his television debut in 2010 with the serial Maziya Priyala Preet Kalena, and Maharashtrachi Hasyajatra helped him gain notoriety. From 2015 to 2020, he acted as a supporting actor in many films including Balkadu (2015), 2018's Gavthi, Sanju, Mauli, 2019's Sarva Line Vyasta Ahet, The Zoya Factor, Vicky Velingkar and 2020's Kaamyaab. He also appeared in television programmes such as Hasyasamrat and The Great Indian Laughter Challenge.

He made an appearance in Hawa Hawai in 2022 alongside Siddhartha Jadhav. In 2023, he featured in Ankush, Boyz 4, and Salman Society. In 2024, the comedy horror Alyad Palyad, directed by Pritam SK Patil, was led by Gaurav More, and supported by Saksham Kulkarni, Sandeep Pathak, Anushka Pimputkar, Bhagyam Jain, and Suresh Vishwakarma.

His first release in 2025 was Sangee, along with the actors Sharib Hashmi, Vidya Malvade, Sanjay Bishnoi. The same year he appeared in Jay Bhim Panther and he will next portray in Mahaparinirvan.

== Filmography ==
Key
†	Denotes films that have not yet been released

Year	Film	Language	Ref(s)
2009	Thoda Pyaar Thoda Magic	Hindi	
2015	Balkadu	Marathi	
2018	Gavthi	Marathi	
2018	Sanju	Hindi	
2018	Mauli	Marathi	
2019	Sarva Line Vyasta Ahet	Marathi	
2019	The Zoya Factor	Hindi	
2019	Vicky Velingkar	Marathi	
2020	Kaamyaab	Hindi	
2022	Hawa Hawai	Marathi	
2023	Ankush	Marathi	
2023	Boyz 4	Marathi	
2023	Salman Society	Marathi	
2023	London Misal	Marathi	
2024	Alyad Palyad	Marathi	
2024	Phullwanti	Marathi	
2025	Sangee	Hindi	
2025	Deva	Hindi	
2025	Jay Bhim Panther	Marathi	
2025	Vaajav Re	Marathi	
2025	MahaParinirvaan †	Marathi	
TBA	Thappa †	Marathi	

== Television ==
- Maziya Priyala Preet Kalena
- The Great Indian Laughter Challenge
- Hasya Samrat
- Maharashtrachi Hasyajatra
- Madness Machayenge – India Ko Hasayenge
- Chala Hawa Yeu Dya
