= Chala Hawa Yeu Dya =

Indian television show

- Genre: Sketch comedy Chat show
- Written by: Nilesh Sable; Yogesh Shirsat
- Directed by: Nilesh Sable
- Starring: See below
- Country of origin: India
- Original language: Marathi
- No. of seasons: 10
- No. of episodes: 1177

Production
- Producers: Nitin Keni; Akash Chawla
- Camera setup: Multi-camera
- Running time: 45–60 minutes
- Production company: Zee Studios

Original release
- Network: Zee Marathi
- Release: 18 August 2014 – 14 December 2025

Chala Hawa Yeu Dya (transl. Let the wind blow) is an Indian Marathi language TV reality show which aired on Zee Marathi. It was Zee Marathi's fourth longest running Indian television show in Marathi language.

The show opens with Nilesh Sable's topical comic monologue, then transitions into guest interviews featuring celebrity guests typically from the Marathi film and theatre industry followed by comedic sketches by recurring performers Bhalchandra Kadam, Kushal Badrike, Bharat Ganeshpure, Shreya Bugde, Sagar Karande, Ankur Vadhave, Yogesh Shirsat, Tushar Deol, Umesh Jagtap, Snehal Shidam. It premiered from 18 August 2014 by replacing Fu Bai Fu.

This show was stopped first time for shooting of new season on 7 November 2017 and from 8 January 2018, the show again started with the extended title Jagbhar Chala Hawa Yeu Dya consisting of the comedian's World Tour journey, sponsored by Veena World Tours. However, third and eighth season received negative response from the audience stating that it was gaudy comedy. This show was stopped second time due to the COVID-19 pandemic on 24 March 2020 and restarted from 13 July 2020. Due to negative response and decrease in TRP, they stopped their eight-season Ladies Jindabad from April 2021 without a finale.

== Seasons ==
=== Chala Hawa Yeu Dya ===
| No. | Airing Date | Days |
|---|---|---|
| | 18 August 2014 – 8 December 2015 | Mon-Tue |
| | 2 April – 24 August 2018 | Mon-Tue |
| | 13 July – 15 September 2020 | Mon-Tue |
| | 3 May – 15 June 2021 | Mon-Tue |
| | 21 June – 1 December 2021 | Mon-Wed |
| | 1 August – 25 October 2022 | Mon-Tue |
| | 31 October – 14 December 2022 | Mon-Wed |
| | 19 December 2022 – 9 May 2023 | Mon-Tue |
| | 25 September – 21 November 2023 | Mon-Tue |
| | 27 November 2023 – 17 March 2024 | Mon-Sat |
| | 26 July – 14 December 2025 | Sat-Sun |

=== Other seasons ===
| Season | Originally Broadcast | | Days | Name |
| Season | First aired | Last aired | Days | Name |
|---|---|---|---|---|
| 1 | 14 December 2015 | 25 April 2017 | Mon-Tue | Maharashtra Daura |
| 2 | 1 May 2017 | 7 November 2017 | Mon-Tue | Bharat Daura |
| 3 | 8 January 2018 | 27 March 2018 | Mon-Tue | Jagbhar Chala Hawa Yeu Dya |
| 4 | 27 August 2018 | 6 November 2018 | Mon-Tue | Hou De Viral |
| 4 | 26 November 2018 | 23 April 2019 | Mon-Tue | Hou De Viral |
| 4 | 12 November 2018 | 23 November 2018 | Mon-Fri | Hou De Viral |
| 5 | 29 April 2019 | 25 June 2019 | Mon-Tue | Shelibrity Pattern |
| 5 | 5 August 2019 | 24 March 2020 | Mon-Tue | Shelibrity Pattern |
| 5 | 1 July 2019 | 1 August 2019 | Mon-Thu | Shelibrity Pattern |
| 6 | 5 August 2020 | 19 September 2020 | Wed-Sat | Utsav Hasyacha |
| 7 | 21 September 2020 | 28 April 2021 | Mon-Wed | Ladies Jindabad |
| 8 | 6 December 2021 | 26 July 2022 | Mon-Tue | Varhad Nighalay Americala |
| 9 | 15 May 2023 | 19 September 2023 | Mon-Tue | Lahan Tondi Motha Ghas |
| 10 | 26 July 2025 | 14 December 2025 | Sat-Sun | Comedycha Gangwar |

=== Special episode (Sunday) ===
1. 3 March 2019 (Finale of Hou De Viral)
2. 16 February 2020 (Jalesh Cruise Safar)
3. 8 March 2020 (Finale of Shelibrity Pattern)
4. 8 August 2021 (Hou Dya Zingat)
5. 27 February 2022 (Jhund film special)
6. 7 May 2023 (Tendlya film special)
7. 31 December 2023 (New Year special)

== Sketch comedy ==
The show follows a recurring theme in sketch comedy. The premise of the sketch is the fictional village of Thukaratwadi where host Nilesh Sable, playing himself, invites the celebrity guests at his café. Nilesh is the writer of most of these comedy sketches with improv acts by the actors. The format of the show begins with introductions of the celebrity guests that is mostly tied up with upcoming promotions of a film or theatre release. Nilesh plays himself as the owner of the café of Thukratwadi. The interview is interspersed with comedic bits that include Bharat Ganeshpure who is the Sarpanch (village chief) making formal introductions of the guests.

== Cast ==
=== Chala Hawa Yeu Dya ===
- Nilesh Sable - He is the owner of the café of Thukaratwadi where their guests are invited.
- Bhalchandra Kadam as Pappa is Nilesh's father. He is known to confuse people's names and ends up in comedic situations as a result.
- Kushal Badrike as Nilesh's twin brother. He is a big movie buff and obsessed with pursuing acting as a career.
- Bharat Ganeshpure as Sarpanch. The Sarpanch is the traditional village chief who welcomes Nilesh's guests to Thukaratwadi. He repeatedly mispronounces names of the guests and frequently blames the writers for bad handwriting or writing in English instead of Marathi. His token gesture of welcoming guests includes gifting a flower bouquet to each guest just for the sake of the official photograph and then taking it back, citing shortage of bouquets.
- Shreya Bugde as Sarpanch's daughter. She is a close friend of Kushal's and often barges into the café with the hope of finding her Prince Charming. Shreya also plays various characters on the series.
- Sagar Karande as the Lavani queen, Postman kaka, Puneri baai.
- Vinit Bhonde as various characters.
- Manasi Naik as the neighborhood of Nilesh.
- Priyadarshan Jadhav as the Ajoba of Nilesh.

=== Maharashtra Daura ===
- Nilesh Sable as Sadanad Buche
- Shreya Bugde as Various Characters
- Bharat Ganeshpure as judge at celebrity courtroom trials, Prashant Amle, Vandekar Bhauji, Police Inspector
- Bhalchandra Kadam as Jyotish Baaskar, Shantabai, Daya
- Kushal Badrike as Various Characters
- Sagar Karande as the lavani queen, Postman kaka, Puneri baai
- Vinit Bhonde as Various Characters
- Ramesh Wani as Various Characters
- Shashikant Kerkar as Various Characters
- Sandeep Redkar as Various Characters

=== Bharat Daura ===
- Nilesh Sable as Host, Sadanad Buche
- Bharat Ganeshpure as Judge, Prashant Amle, Vandekar Bhauji, Police Inspector
- Bhalchandra Kadam as Jyotish Baaskar, Shantabai, Daya
- Kushal Badrike as Various Characters
- Shreya Bugde as Various Characters
- Sagar Karande as the lavani queen, Postman kaka, Puneri baai, Lawyer
- Vinit Bhonde as various characters

=== Jagbhar Chala Hawa Yeu Dya ===
- Nilesh Sable as Host, Sadanad Buche
- Bharat Ganeshpure as Judge, Prashant Amle, Vandekar Bhauji, Police Inspector
- Bhalchandra Kadam as Jyotish Baaskar, Shantabai, Daya
- Kushal Badrike as various characters
- Shreya Bugde as various characters
- Sagar Karande as the Lavani queen, Postman kaka, Puneri baai, Lawyer
- Ankur Wadhave as various characters

=== Hou De Viral ===
This is the fifth season by the show where contestants were chosen from auditions taken in different parts of Maharashtra. The top five contestants of this season are:-

1. Snehal Shidam (Winner)
2. Pravin Tikhe
3. Pooja Sadamate-Nagral
4. Arnav Kalkundri
5. Gauravi Vaidya

=== Shelibrity Pattern ===
This is the sixth season by the show, where television celebrities compete with each other through performing comedy skits on stage. The top 7 contestants of this season are:

1. Umesh Jagtap (Winner)
2. Sharmila Shinde
3. Adwait Dadarkar
4. Rahul Magdum
5. Abhidnya Bhave
6. Raj Hanchnale
7. Pravin Dalimbkar

=== Utsav Hasyacha ===
- Nilesh Sabale
- Bhalchandra Kadam
- Bharat Ganeshpure
- Kushal Badrike
- Shreya Bugde
- Sagar Karande
- Snehal Shidam
- Ankur Wadhave
- Yogesh Shirsat
- Umesh Jagtap

=== Ladies Jindabad ===
This is the eighth season by the show, where ten female celebrities are taken for contestants.

1. Gayatri Datar (Winner)
2. Monalisa Bagal
3. Mayuri Wagh
4. Suruchi Adarkar
5. Shivani Baokar
6. Sarita Mehendale-Joshi
7. Purva Shinde
8. Bhakti Ratnaparkhi
9. Sanjivani Sathe
10. Snehlata Tawde-Vasaikar

== Awards ==
Zee Marathi Utsav Natyancha Awards
| Year | Category | Recipient |
|---|---|---|
| 2014 | Best Anchor | Nilesh Sable |
| 2015 | Best Non-fiction Show | Essel Vision Productions |
| 2015 | Best Comedy Character | Bhalchandra Kadam |
| 2015 | Best Anchor | Nilesh Sable |
| 2016 | Best Comedy Character | Bhalchandra Kadam |
| 2016 | Best Anchor | Nilesh Sable |
| 2016 | Best Non-fiction Show | Essel Vision Productions |
| 2017 | Best Anchor | Nilesh Sable |
| 2017 | Best Non-fiction Show | Essel Vision Productions |
| 2017 | Best Comedy Character | Bhalchandra Kadam |
| 2018 | Best Non-fiction Show | Essel Vision Productions |
| 2021 | Best Non-fiction Show | Essel Vision Productions |
| 2022 | Best Non-fiction Show | Essel Vision Productions |
| 2023 | Best Non-fiction Show | Essel Vision Productions |
| 2025 | Best Anchor | Abhijeet Khandkekar |
| 2025 | Best Non-fiction Show | Essel Vision Productions |

== Reception ==
| Week | Year | BARC Viewership | | Ref. |
| Week | Year | TRP | Rank | Ref. |
|---|---|---|---|---|
| Week 22 | 2016 | 2.3 | 1 | |
| Week 23 | 2016 | 2.7 | 1 | |
| Week 23 | 2016 | 1.6 | 5 | |
| Week 24 | 2016 | 2.9 | 1 | |
| Week 28 | 2016 | 2.0 | 2 | |
| Week 29 | 2016 | 1.8 | 3 | |
| Week 31 | 2016 | 2.2 | 2 | |
| Week 34 | 2016 | 2.3 | 4 | |
| Week 35 | 2016 | 2.7 | 1 | |
| Week 38 | 2016 | 1.9 | 3 | |
| Week 42 | 2016 | 2.7 | 3 | |
| Week 47 | 2016 | 2.5 | 4 | |
| Week 12 | 2017 | 2.7 | 4 | |
| Week 15 | 2017 | 2.3 | 5 | |
| Week 23 | 2017 | 2.5 | 3 | |
| Week 27 | 2017 | 3.0 | 3 | |
| Week 30 | 2017 | 3.6 | 3 | |
| Week 30 | 2017 | 2.1 | 5 | |
| Week 37 | 2017 | 2.6 | 4 | |
| Week 15 | 2018 | 2.4 | 5 | |
| Week 34 | 2018 | 4.7 | 3 | |
| Week 35 | 2018 | 5.5 | 2 | |
| Week 38 | 2018 | 3.4 | 4 | |
| Week 40 | 2018 | 4.4 | 5 | |
| Week 41 | 2018 | 4.0 | 5 | |
| Week 43 | 2018 | 4.4 | 5 | |
| Week 45 | 2018 | 3.4 | 5 | |
| Week 46 | 2018 | 4.5 | 4 | |
| Week 47 | 2018 | 4.0 | 5 | |
| Week 49 | 2018 | 3.5 | 5 | |
| Week 50 | 2018 | 3.9 | 5 | |
| Week 52 | 2018 | 4.8 | 3 | |
| Week 1 | 2019 | 4.1 | 5 | |
| Week 2 | 2019 | 4.3 | 5 | |
| Week 3 | 2019 | 4.5 | 5 | |
| Week 4 | 2019 | 4.4 | 4 | |
| Week 5 | 2019 | 4.0 | 4 | |
| Week 14 | 2019 | 3.7 | 3 | |
| Week 16 | 2019 | 3.1 | 3 | |
| Week 17 | 2019 | 3.1 | 3 | |
| Week 21 | 2019 | 3.8 | 2 | |
| Week 23 | 2019 | 4.0 | 3 | |
| Week 25 | 2019 | 2.9 | 5 | |
| Week 26 | 2019 | 3.8 | 5 | |
| Week 27 | 2019 | 3.1 | 5 | |
| Week 29 | 2019 | 4.5 | 3 | |
| Week 30 | 2019 | 4.3 | 3 | |
| Week 31 | 2019 | 3.9 | 4 | |
| Week 34 | 2019 | 4.2 | 4 | |
| Week 35 | 2019 | 3.8 | 4 | |
| Week 36 | 2019 | 3.6 | 4 | |
| Week 37 | 2019 | 3.2 | 5 | |
| Week 38 | 2019 | 3.6 | 5 | |
| Week 39 | 2019 | 3.6 | 5 | |
| Week 48 | 2019 | 3.8 | 3 | |
| Week 50 | 2019 | 3.9 | 3 | |
| Week 1 | 2020 | 3.7 | 2 | |
| Week 2 | 2020 | 3.3 | 4 | |
| Week 3 | 2020 | 3.9 | 4 | |
| Week 4 | 2020 | 3.5 | 2 | |
| Week 5 | 2020 | 3.5 | 2 | |
| Week 6 | 2020 | 3.7 | 2 | |
| Week 7 | 2020 | 3.2 | 4 | |
| Week 8 | 2020 | 4.0 | 2 | |
| Week 9 | 2020 | 3.3 | 2 | |
| Week 10 | 2020 | 3.4 | 3 | |
| Week 13 | 2020 | 2.6 | 1 | |
| Week 15 | 2020 | 1.3 | 2 | |
| Week 16 | 2020 | 1.3 | 2 | |
| Week 17 | 2020 | 1.1 | 2 | |
| Week 18 | 2020 | 1.0 | 2 | |
| Week 19 | 2020 | 0.9 | 2 | |
| Week 20 | 2020 | 0.9 | 2 | |
| Week 21 | 2020 | 0.9 | 2 | |
| Week 22 | 2020 | 0.9 | 2 | |
| Week 28 | 2020 | 2.1 | 5 | |
| Week 36 | 2020 | 3.4 | 2 | |
| Week 36 | 2020 | 3.0 | 5 | |
