= Supriya Pathare =

Indian actress

- Born: 8 April 1973 (age 53); Umarkhadi, India
- Occupation: Actress
- Years active: 1995–present
- Spouse: Minesh Pathare (m. 1995)
- Relatives: Archana Nevrekar (sister)

Supriya Pathare is a Marathi television, theatre, and film actress. She is known for her portrayal in Pudhcha Paaul as Kanchanmala & Honar Soon Mi Hya Gharchi as Mothi Aai. She had participated in Fu Bai Fu as a contestant. Currently, she is playing the character of Maai in Thipkyanchi Rangoli.

== Personal life ==
Pathare is married and has two children, a boy and a girl. Settled in Thane. Her son has returned from United States after completion of study then he started Pav bhaji truck named as 'Maharaj'(मharaj) in Thane.

== Career ==
Pathare was born at Umarkhadi in Sandhurst Road, Mumbai. There was no background of acting in her family. She was extremely active in theatre from school days and also wrote a script when in the 7th Standard. Tin Paishancha Tamasha was a play where many amateur actors tried their luck and Supriya used this opportunity to fine tune her acting skills with the help of her Guru Waman Kendre. Kickstarting her career with the Marathi Play Darling, Darling. Darling, Darling was Supriya's first commercial play. Over sixteen years, Supriya performed in a number of plays and has made a mark in the acting fraternity.

Supriya has also managed to show her talent as comedian by acting in a comedy reality show Fu Bai Fu. She has played different role types, negative characters, loving motherly characters as well as comedy standup actor in Fu Bai Fu, which she won with Bhau Kadam in one year. Supriya was appearing in a Marathi serial, Honar Soon Mi Hya Gharchi. She also acted in and is famous for her cast in Pudhcha Paaul as "Kanchanmala Randive" or Kanchanmala Bai as Akkasaheb called her. This was a negative role.

Supriya Pathare claimed that she was held "captive" for three months by a producer in Rajasthan during the shooting of a film and was rescued at the intervention of late Shiv Sena chief Bal Thackeray.

== Filmography ==
=== Films ===
Year	Title	Role	Notes
2004	He Aapla Asach Chalaycha	Kanchan Mohite	Debut film
2006	Golmaal	Gajra Tai's Henchwoman	Cameo appearance
2008	Dili Supari Baikochi	Baiko	Debut lead role
2009	Anolkhi He Ghar Majhe	Nazuka	
2011	Morya	Mrs. Ghorpade	Supporting role
2011	Fakta Ladh Mhana	Savkar's wife	Supporting role
2011	Karooya Udyachi Baat		Supporting role
2012	Balak-Palak	Mrs. Puranik	Supporting role
2013	Balkadu	Baalkrishna's mother	Supporting role
2014	Mardaani	Sarla Kulkarni	Cameo appearance
2014	Timepass	Prajakta's aunt	Cameo appearance
2015	Timepass 2	Prajakta's aunt	Cameo appearance
2015	Slam Book	Aparna's Aai	Supporting role
2017	Chi Va Chi Sau Ka	Satya's mother	Parallel lead
2017	Kay Re Rascalaa	Andalu	Parallel lead
2024	Nach Ga Ghuma	Anand's mother	
2026	Maitreyaa		

=== Television ===
Year	Title	Role	Channel	Ref.
2001-2005	Shriyut Gangadhar Tipre	Tipre's neighborhood	Zee Marathi	
2008-2010	Kulvadhu		Zee Marathi	
2011	Pinjara	Anandi's mother	Zee Marathi	
2012-2015	Pudhcha Paaul	Kanchanmala Randive	Star Pravah	
2012-2014	Fu Bai Fu	Contestant	Zee Marathi	
2013-2016	Honar Soon Mi Hya Gharchi	Indrayani Gokhale (Mothi Aai)	Zee Marathi	
2017-2018	Jaago Mohan Pyare	Shobha Mhatre	Zee Marathi	
2019-2020	Molkarin Bai – Mothi Tichi Savali	Ambika	Star Pravah	
2020-2021	Assa Maher Nako Ga Baai!	Anusaya Upasane	Sony Marathi	
2021	Shreemantagharchi Suun	Devika	Sony Marathi	
2021-2023	Thipkyanchi Rangoli	Madhavi (Maai) Kanitkar	Star Pravah	
2024–present	Sadhi Manasa	Satya's mother	Star Pravah	

== Plays ==
- Darling, Darling
- Hich Majhi Rani

== Awards ==
- Natya Darpan Puraskar for play Darling Darling
- Best Mother-in-law in Zee Marathi Utsav Natyancha Awards 2015
