= Ranjan (film) =

- Directed by: Prakash Pawar
- Story by: shubham sanjiv patil
- Starring: Yash Kulkarni, Gauri Kulkarni, Pushkar Lonarkar, Anil Nagarkar, Bhalchandra Kadam, Bharat Ganeshpure, Vidyadhar Joshi
- Cinematography: Shivaji Kale
- Edited by: Mayur Hardas
- Music by: Narendra Bhide
- Release date: 2017
- Country: India
- Language: Marathi

Ranjan is a Marathi feature film released on 17 February 2017. Written and directed by Prakash Pawar, Ranjan explores the teenage love story of a school going boy and girl.

== Cast ==
- Yash Kulkarni
- Gauri Kulkarni
- Pushkar Lonarkar
- Anil Nagarkar
- Kishor salvi
- Bhalchandra Kadam
- Bharat Ganeshpure

== Reception ==
The film received a very negative review in the Pune Mirror, where the reviewer called it "so arbitrary and meaningless, it is almost beyond serious discussion".
