= Kanala Khada =

Marathi language talk show

- Genre: Chat show
- Starring: Sanjay Mone
- Country of origin: India
- Original language: Marathi
- No. of episodes: 56

Production
- Camera setup: Multi-camera
- Running time: 45 minutes

Original release
- Network: Zee Marathi
- Release: 30 November 2018 – 29 June 2019

Kanala Khada is an Indian television chat show in Marathi language originally aired on Zee Marathi. It was hosted by Sanjay Mone and premiered from 30 November 2018.

== Concept ==
The show invited celebrity guests every week to talk about their personalities, controversies, relations and they share their special experiences which made them to remember as "Kanala Khada".

== Celebrity Guests ==
- Rakhi Sawant
- Shreya Bugade
- Swapnil Joshi
- Bhalchandra Kadam
- Anita Date-Kelkar
- Rohini Hattangadi
- Abhijeet Khandkekar
- Surekha Punekar
- Amruta Khanvilkar
- Anand Shinde
- Vaibhav Mangle
- Ashok Saraf
- Sonalee Kulkarni
- Tejashri Pradhan
- Sanjay Narvekar
- Jitendra Joshi
- Sai Tamhankar
- Ravindra Kolhe
- Priya Arun
- Renuka Shahane
- Kishori Shahane
- Tejaswini Pandit
- Abhinay Berde
- Shreegauri Sawant
- Makrand Deshpande
- Jagannath Dixit
