= Sangee (2025 film) =

2025 Hindi Feature Film

- Theatrical release poster
- Directed by: Sumit Kulkarni
- Written by: Thopte Vijaysinh Sarjerao
- Produced by: Rohhan Bhosale; Arun Prabhudesai; Pintu Saw; Pratik Thakur
- Starring: Sharib Hashmi; Vidya Malvade; Gaurav More
- Cinematography: Sopan Purandare
- Edited by: Hemant Vansh
- Music by: Manoj More
- Production companies: Yantrana Films; Armoks Films
- Distributed by: August Entertainment
- Release date: 17 January 2025
- Running time: 103 minutes
- Country: India
- Language: Hindi

Sangee is a 2025 Indian Hindi-language comedy film directed by Sumit Kulkarni and written by Thopte Vijaysinh Sarjerao. The film was produced by Yantrana Films and Armoks Films. It stars Sharib Hashmi, Sanjay Bishnoi, Gaurav More, Vidya Malvade, and Shyamraj Patil and was theatrically released on 17 January 2025.

== Plot ==
A middle-aged unsettled Baman has a bad reputation of borrowing money from his well-settled classmates. He is once again on his mission of acquiring the interest free funds for his new venturer. He tries to get the much-needed money from his three classmates Arun, Ayyappa and Shailesh. He fails miserably due to his own past bad reputation. Finally, Baman approaches his two best friends - Akhil and Karan. He wants the required funds from them by hook or by crook. However, his friends are adamant this time. They have decided not to give him anything come what may. Baman finally wins it and gets the required funds, but after going through a lot of turmoil.

== Cast ==
- Sharib Hashmi as Baman
- Sanjay Bishnoi as Karan
- Gaurav More as More
- Vidya Malvade as Mohini
- Shyamraj Patil as Akhil
- Martin Jishil as Ayyappa
- Mira Jagannath as Brinda
- Arun Prabhudesai as Arun

== Release ==
Sangee was theatrically release on 17 January 2025.

== Reception ==
ABP Live rated 3/5 stars, stating that everyone can connect with the film due to the relationship of friends and money. Dhaval Roy, of The Times of India rated 3/5 stars and wrote "Sharib Hashmi shines in this fun buddy comedy." Bollywood Hungama rated 2/5 and wrote "Sangee stands out for Sharib Hashmi's highly entertaining performance". The Nav Bharat Times rated 3/5 stars, saying it will remind you of friends who have a habit of asking you for money.
