= Ankush (2023 film) =

- Official release poster
- Directed by: Nishant Natharam Dhapse
- Screenplay by: Nishant Natharam Dhapse; Namdeo Murkute
- Story by: Namdeo Murkute
- Produced by: Rajabhau Apparao Ghule
- Starring: Deepraj; Ketaki Mategaonkar
- Cinematography: Nagraj M. D.
- Edited by: Nilesh Navnath Gavand
- Music by: Amitraj; Chinar–Mahesh
- Production company: Omkar Films Creations
- Distributed by: Filmastra Studios
- Release date: 6 October 2023
- Country: India
- Language: Marathi

Ankush is a 2023 Indian Marathi-language action drama film directed by Nishant Natharam Dhapse in his directorial debut and produced by Rajabhau Apparao Ghule under the banner of Omkar Films Creations. The film stars debutant Deepraj in a title role, alongside Ketaki Mategaonkar, Sayaji Shinde, Mangesh Desai, and Chinmay Udgirkar. It also features Shashank Shende, Rutuja Bagwe, Gaurav More, Bharat Ganeshpure and Nagesh Bhosale in supporting roles.

It was theatrically released on 6 October 2023.

== Plot ==
Ankush is very intelligent and loved by all. Being a middle-class family, the family has high expectations from Ankush. It is everyone's dream that he should study hard and become successful. But his financial situation is not good so he gets bullied by rich kids in college. However, he handles them with his loving nature. Due to this nature, a girl named Ravi falls in love with him. Ankush comes under the influence of Bhosle bhai, who helps the poor, and aspires to be like him. Ankush doesn't know how many snacks he has to eat to become like them. Ankush has a fight in college and the boys belong to Sajan Bhai's gang. Sajan Bhai decides to kill Ankush as a revenge. Ankush falls in between both goons to save his own life.

== Cast ==
- Deepraj as Ankush Surve
- Ketaki Mategaonkar as Raavi
- Sayaji Shinde as Rana Pardeshi
- Mangesh Desai as Sajan Bhai
- Chinmay Udgirkar as Bhosale Bhai
- Shashank Shende as Avinash Surve
- Rutuja Bagwe as Nandini
- Gaurav More as Mangya
- Bharat Ganeshpure as Police Inspector
- Puja Ashok Nayak as Ankush's mother
- Nagesh Bhosale as Pradhyapak

== Production ==
Rajabhau Apparao Ghule making debut with the film as producer named Omkar Films Creations to the Studio. The film was officially announced on Dussehra 2022 via poster. This is debut film for Deepraj as an actor and Nishant Natharam Dhapse as director. The film's action scenes have been created by Vikram Mor, choreography by Ganesh Acharya and art direction by Girish Kolpakar.

== Release ==
The film was released on 6 October 2023 in Maharashtra.

== Reception ==
Anub George of The Times of India rated 1.5 out of 5 stars and wrote "The action-drama fails to capture the imagination on account of poor execution."

== Soundtrack ==
The music is composed by Amitraj and Chinar–Mahesh, background score is provided by Amar Mohile, while the lyrics is written by Mangesh Kangane and Mandar Cholkar.
