= Mamachya Gavala Jaaoo Yaa =

- Theatrical release poster
- मामाच्या गावाला जाऊ या
- Directed by: Sameer Hemant Joshi
- Written by: Sameer Hemant Joshi
- Produced by: Punkaj Challani
- Starring: Abhijeet Khandkekar; Mrunmayee Deshpande; Saahil Malge; Shubhankar Atre; Arya Bhargude; Devendra Gaikwad; Ninad Mahajani; Saniya Godbole; Shaunak Joshi
- Cinematography: Abhijit D. Abde
- Edited by: Suchitra Sathe
- Music by: Prashant Pillai
- Distributed by: Punkaj Challani Films
- Release date: 21 November 2014
- Running time: 103 minutes
- Country: India
- Language: Marathi

Mamachya Gavala Jaaoo Yaa (transl. Let's Go To Uncle's Village) is a 2014 Indian Marathi-lanquage adventurous thriller film directed by Sameer Hemant Joshi and produced by Pankaj Challani Films. It stars Abhijeet Khandkekar and Mrunmayee Deshpande in lead roles. The film was theatrically released on 21 November 2014.

== Plot ==
The story of the film is about the uncle(Mama) we all look up to. He is a friend, a partner in crime, and someone your mother adores, a guy who you look up to, but who lives far away! But distance often bringhearts closer, and that's why one of the most adorable of the relationships keeps growing stronger with our Mama! Mamachya Gavala Jaaoo Yaa is about this quintessential Mama and his world-apart nephews and niece on an adventurous journey!

== Cast ==
- Abhijeet Khandkekar as Nandu Devkar
- Mrunmayee Deshpande
- Saahil Malge
- Shubhankar Atre
- Arya Bhargude
- Devendra Gaikwad
- Ninad Mahajani
- Saniya Godbole
- Shaunak Joshi

== Soundtrack ==
Music of the film was scored by Prashant Pillai, while the lyrics were written by Sandip Khare and Avdhoot Gupte.

== Release ==
The film was released all over the Maharashtra on 21 November 2014.
