= Mayuri Wagh =

Indian actress

- Born: 1 December 1988 (age 37); Dombivli, Maharashtra
- Occupation: Actress
- Spouse: Piyush Ranade (m. 2018, separated)

Mayuri Wagh is a Marathi television and film actress. She is known for her performances in Asmita and in Ti Phulrani.

== Career ==
Mayuri is originally from the town of Dombivli near Mumbai. She started her career as a side dancer and theater artist. Mayuri Wagh debuted in Marathi television with the serial Vachan Dile Tu Mala Star Pravah. Later she played the role "Detective Asmita" in the Zee Marathi crime-based series Asmita. She has also appeared in reality shows such as Housefull, and Sugaran & Mejwani Paripoorna Kitchen.

== Filmography ==
=== Television ===
| Year | Show | Channel | Role | Ref. |
|---|---|---|---|---|
| 2009 | Vachan Dile Tu Mala | Star Pravah | Rama | |
| 2010-2011 | Hi Vaat Door Jate | Saam TV | Lead role | |
| 2011-2012 | Ya Valnawar | ETV Marathi | Renuka's sister | |
| 2011 | Comedy Express | ETV Marathi | Contestant | |
| 2011 | Mejwani Paripoorna Kitchen | ETV Marathi | Host | |
| 2013 | Sugran | Saam TV | Host | |
| 2014-2017 | Asmita | Zee Marathi | Asmita Agnihotri | |
| 2017-2018 | Love Lagna Locha | Zee Yuva | Rutu | |
| 2018-2019 | Ti Phulrani | Sony Marathi | Manju | |
| 2020 | Chala Hawa Yeu Dya | Zee Marathi | Contestant | |
| 2022 | Aashirvad Tuza Ekvira Aai | Sony Marathi | Ekvira Aai | |
| 2023-2024 | Aboli | Star Pravah | Shivangi Deshmane | |
| 2026 | Yed Lagla Premacha | Star Pravah | Gargi | |

=== Film ===
- Manyaa-The Wonder Boy

=== Theater ===
- Sohala Gosht Premachi
- Mangalyach Lena
