= Vicky Velingkar =

Marathi language thriller film

- First look poster
- Directed by: Saurabh Verma
- Written by: Swapnil Warke
- Produced by: Anuya Chauhan Kudecha; Ritesh Kudecha; Sachin Lokhande; Atul Tarkar
- Starring: Sonalee Kulkarni; Spruha Joshi
- Edited by: Prachi Rohidas
- Production companies: GSEAMS; Loki's Studio; Dancing Shiva
- Release date: 6 December 2019
- Country: India
- Language: Marathi

Vicky Velingkar is an Indian Marathi-language thriller film directed by Saurabh Verma and produced by Anuya Chauhan Kudecha, Ritesh Kudecha, Sachin Lokhande and Atul Tarkar under the banner of Dancing Shiva, GSEAMS, Loki's Studio and Pranay Chokshi. The film is bankrolled by Arjun Singgh Baran and Kartk D Nishandar. The film stars Sonalee Kulkarni in title role of 'Vicky Velingkar', who is a comic book artist and a clock seller. She gets entangled in an unexpected mystery and rises against all odds. The film also features Spruha Joshi in pivotal role.

Vicky Velingkar was released theatrically on 6 December 2019.

== Plot ==
Vicky is a young lady who is staying with her Granny in Mumbai and runs a watch store from her home. She has a friend Lucky who loves her, but she is in a relationship with another guy. Lucky is a skilful hacker but does not misuse his skills. One day she gets a call from a cop who informs her that she should immediately visit her friend Shrusti's home. Shrusti is a brilliant scientist and Vicky is very fond of her and calls her "Rocket Tai". Vicky has also written a comics book for her with the same title. Vicky tries calling Shrusti, but no one answers. In a panic, she gets a cab to her place. On the way she notices specifics incidents like guys fighting, kids playing, etc. When she reaches the place, the cop informs her that Shrusti has committed suicide by shooting herself. There she meets Vidya, a neighbour of Shrusti. Vicky does not agree because her laptop is missing.

She calls Lucky to inform him of Shruti's death and he tells her that he received a cryptic email from Shrusti just before she died. He is sitting at an abandoned construction site, a place of party her boyfriend had earlier decided for. She meets him there and Lucky tells Vicky that someone is following him and they should first escape to a safer place. As they are about to leave, they sense a stranger chasing them. After a brief chase, they are both shot dead by a stranger with a fearsome mask. Next, we see Vicky waking up at her home in the same situation at the beginning of this sequence. She thinks of it as a bad dream. She then receives a call from the same cop and the same sequence of events reoccur right from the cab driver to the crime scene. She thinks of Deja Vu and tries to alert Lucky. She cannot reach him because of bad network and decides to visit him. She tries to alert him, but again suffers the same fate and both are shot dead by the same stranger. Again she wakes up at her home in the same position at the beginning of this sequence.

Vicky is confused as these events repeat like a loop and every time she tries to avert the killings she is rendered unsuccessful. In the 6th iteration, she decides she would not answer the call and meets Lucky at a cafe instead and tells him about these events. Lucky tries to associate these events with Shrusti's death and start looking for a clue. He finds that Vicky is wearing the same watch that was with Shrusti earlier and concludes that this watch has some relation with these events. Later they visit the cop and narrate to him everything. The cop does not believe her, but she predicts the fate of an ongoing match correctly which forces the cop to believe her. He visits with them to the construction site to catch the masked stranger. After a few minutes of chaos, the masked stranger appears and they are both killed again. In the subsequent iteration, Vicky concludes runs through events of the last iteration for clues and figures out that the cop is the stranger. Later both visit the home of Shrusti and enter after the cops leave. They are searching for clues and finally find a recorded message by Shrusti. In the message she tells Vicky that the watch has put her in a time loop and every time she dies, she would be sent back to the beginning of the loop, but this can happen for 10 iterations. After the message, they run into the stranger and Vicky identifies him. With this, the stranger removes his mask and it is revealed that it is indeed the same cop. However, both die again.

In between, she tries to change her fate but reaches the last iteration unsuccessful. She decides to do a live recording of the event as the only way to change her fate and tells Lucky and her granny not to worry about her and leaves alone. She asks Vidya to record her live session and places herself as bait for the cop. On confrontation with him, she tells him that he is on a live streaming event. It seems that the cop has finally given up, but suddenly she is hit on her head from behind.

Later we see Vicky is tied up and Vidya revealed to be the mastermind of this whole event. She spied on Shrusti for months and finally discovers what she has achieved. She asks the cop who is her boyfriend to threaten her and recover the watch from her. The cop losses his patience in between and ends up shooting Shrusti. In this case, only Vicky knows that this is her last iteration but plays on their mind. She tells them in her previous iteration she saw the cop shooting dead Vidya. Vidya is led to believe this because the cop is trigger happy person and she shoots him dead. Vicky tells Vidya that killing her would be futile as she would be transported back to the beginning of the sequence and now that her face is exposed in this iteration she would stay away from her in the future. In case she gets the watch in the next iteration she still doesn't know how to use it. Vicky smartly talks Vidya into shooting herself to use the watch. Vidya shoots herself dead and Vicky unties her and returns home.

== Cast ==
- Sonalee Kulkarni as Vicky Velingkar
- Spruha Joshi as Vidya
- Sangram Samel as Lucky Lokhande
- Kettan Singh as Sankarsh Salunkhe
- Gaurav More as taxi driver Parshuram
- Jui Pawar as Srushti
- Rama Joshi as Vicky's grandmother

== Release ==
The film was released theatrically on 6 December 2019.
