= Jai Maharashtra Dhaba Bhatinda =

- Directed by: Avadhoot Gupte
- Produced by: Atul Kamble; Avadhoot Gupte
- Starring: Abhijeet Khandkekar; Tushar Kamble; Prarthana Behere; Vikram Gokhale; Avadhoot Gupte
- Music by: Nilesh Moharir
- Release date: 14 February 2013
- Running time: 122 minutes
- Country: India
- Language: Marathi

Jai Maharashtra Dhaba Bhatinda, also known by the abbreviated form JMDB, is a 2013 Indian Marathi-language romantic film directed by Avadhoot Gupte. Produced by Ekvira Productions, A Square Entertainment and Black Gold Films. It starring debutant Abhijeet Khandkekar, Tushar Kamble and Prarthana Behere. It was theatrically released on 14 February 2013.

== Plot ==
A young Maharashtrian man from Kolhapur migrates to Punjab and launches a Maharashtrian dhaba. Then he falls in love with a Punjabi girl. There is also curiosity about a song with fusion of Marathi Powada and Punjabi Bhangra.

== Cast ==
- Abhijeet Khandkekar as Sayaji Nimbalkar (Saya)
- Prarthana Behere as Jaspinder Kaur (Jas)
- Vikram Gokhale as Prataprao Nimbalkar
- Puneet Issar as Jas' father
- Monika Dabade as Gurpreet
- Priyadarshan Jadhav
- Janhavi Prabhu-Arora as cameo role
- Avadhoot Gupte
- Kanwalpreet Singh

== Music ==
The music director was Nilesh Moharir, and the music was composed by Nilesh Moharir and lyrics were written by Guru Thakur. Before the film was released, there was a special launch for the music, sung by veteran singer Suresh Wadkar, and distributed on audio cassettes. The event was attended by Moharir, Thakur, singers Swapnil Bandodkar, Vaishali Samant and Janhavi Prabhu-Arora, producer Atul Kamble, co-producer Rahul Kamble, and lead actors Abhijit Khandkekar and Prarthana Behere. The music received good reviews.

=== Track listing ===
No.	Title	Artist(s)	Length
1.	"Na Kale Kadhi"	Swapnil Bandodkar, Janhavi Prabhu-Arora, Kalpana Khan	05:20
2.	"Awakhalase Sparsh Te"	Rahul Vaidya, Vaishali Samant, Krishna Beura, Ronkini Gupta	05:17
3.	"Dil Hareya Oye"	Janhavi Prabhu-Arora	03:00
4.	"Ga Saajani"	Swapnil Bandodkar, Janhavi Prabhu-Arora, Jawar Dildar	04:19
5.	"Bolto Jithe Chaughada"	Swapnil Bandodkar, Avadhoot Gupte	04:19
6.	"Avakhalase Rehash"	Swapnil Bandodkar	04:30
7.	"Avakhalase Reprise"	Vaishali Samant, Krishna Beura	05:15
Total length:			31:20

== Reception ==
=== Critical reception ===
A reviewer of Loksatta wrote "Abhijit Khandkekar and Prarthana Behere both look cool. Prayer has worked very well. She has shown many shades like hatred, impulse, anger, love, impudence very well". A reviewer of The Times of India wrote "Vikram Gokhale, Shubhangi Latkar, Priyadarshan Jadhav justify their characters. Nilesh Mohrir’s music suits the script. Though the title generates curiosity, the story deflates it!!".
