= Maharashtracha Superstar =

Indian Marathi reality show

- Genre: Reality
- Presented by: Season 1: Amruta Khanvilkar; Aniket Vishwasrao; Season 2: Abhijeet Khandkekar
- Judges: Season 1: Mahesh Manjrekar; Supriya Pilgaonkar; Season 2: Sanjay Jadhav; Makarand Deshpande
- Theme music composer: Nilesh Moharir
- Country of origin: India
- Original language: Marathi
- No. of episodes: 53

Production
- Production locations: Mumbai, Maharashtra
- Camera setup: Multi-camera
- Running time: 45 minutes
- Production company: Essel Vision Productions

Original release
- Network: Zee Marathi
- Release: 17 December 2009 – 23 July 2020

Maharashtracha Superstar is an Indian Marathi language talent hunt show which aired on Zee Marathi. The show returned for its second season in 2020. The series premiered from 17 December 2009 by replacing Hapta Band.

== Concept ==
Maharashtracha Superstar focuses on acting. The show hunts for aspiring artists who can do drama, performing a series of task to test their creativity, spontaneity and acting capabilities. It is a platform for every maharashtrian youth who dreams of making it in the acting. It was feature participants from various cities of Maharashtra. The aim of the show is to find potential Maharashtracha Superstar.

== Season summary ==
Year	Season	Host	Judges	Winner
2009–2010	Season 1	Amruta Khanvilkar; Aniket Vishwasrao	Mahesh Manjrekar; Supriya Pilgaonkar	Nilesh Sable; Yogini Chouk
2020	Season 2	Abhijeet Khandkekar	Sanjay Jadhav; Makarand Deshpande	Atharva Karve

=== Season 1 ===
The winners of the first season were Nilesh Sable and Yogini Chouk.

Name	City
Nilesh Sable	Pune
Yogini Chouk	Mumbai
Nikhil Raut	Pune
Namrata Sambherao	Mumbai
Sneha Kulkarni	Mumbai
Vivek Raut	Mumbai
Abhijeet Khandkekar	Pune
Sankarshan Karhade	Parbhani
Tejpal Wagh	Wai
Dhanashri Kadgaonkar	Pune
Chinmay Udgirkar	Mumbai
Reshma Shinde	Mumbai
Prasad Jawade	Pune
Suparna Kharde	Pune
Yogesh Shirsat	Aurangabad

=== Season 2 ===
The winner of the second season is Atharva Karve and runner ups are Ruchika Khot and Sonam Mhasvekar.
