= Kushal Badrike =

Indian actor and comedian

- Born: 20 July 1982 (age 44); Kolhapur, Maharashtra
- Occupation: Actor
- Years active: 2005–present
- Known for: Chala Hawa Yeu Dya; Fu Bai Fu
- Spouse: Sunaina Badrike (m. 2009)

Kushal Badrike (born 20 July 1982) is a Marathi film, television and stage actor along with being a Hindi television actor, notable for his comic roles in India. He is best known for his comedy skits in Chala Hawa Yeu Dya. He played role of Shridhar Mahajan in the Colors Marathi's serial Asa Saasar Surekh Bai. He also works in the web series known as Struggler Saala, on YouTube.

== Personal life ==
Kushal married to Sunaina Badrike, a Kathak dancer.

== Career ==
Kushal has started his career from Marathi plays like Jaago Mohan Pyare and Lali Leela. Some of his hit movies like Jatra: Hyalagaad Re Tyalagaad, Maza Navra Tuzi Bayko, Huppa Huiyya, Bhaucha Dhakka, etc. He also played a role in a web series Struggler Saala. He participated in the comedy reality show Fu Bai Fu which was aired on Zee Marathi. He working in comedy talk show Chala Hawa Yeu Dya from 2014.

=== Hindi Television ===
He is starring in Madness Machayenge – India Ko Hasayenge comedy show on Sony Entertainment Television which premiered on 9 March 2024 alongside Huma Qureshi, Harsh Gujral, Kettan Singh, Paritosh Tripathi, Gaurav Dubey, Siddharth Sagar, Hemangi Kavi, Snehil Mehra, Inder Sahni, and Ankita Shrivastav.

== Filmography ==
=== Films ===
- Friendship Dot Com -2006
- Jatra: Hyalagaad Re Tyalagaad - 2006
- Waras Sarech Saras - 2006
- Bakula Namdeo Ghotale - 2007
- Majha Navra Tujhi Bayko - 2006
- Huppa Huiyya - 2010
- Davpech - 2010
- Bhaucha Dhakka - 2011
- Khel Mandala - 2012
- Eka Varchad Ek - 2012
- Ek Hota Kau - 2014
- Love Factor - 2014
- Bioscope - 2015
- Slam Book - 2015
- Barayan - 2018
- Loose Control - 2018
- Hichyasathi Kay Pan - 2018
- Gavthi - 2018
- Rampaat - 2019
- Zol Zaal - 2020
- Pandu - 2021
- Bhirkit - 2022
- Ravrambha - 2023
- Baap Manus - 2023
- Super Duperr - 2026
- Ghabadkund - 2026
- Mamachya Govyala Jauya - 2026

=== Television ===
- Fu Bai Fu as various role
- Chala Hawa Yeu Dya as various role
- Shubham Karoti
- Malwani Days
- Tujhyat Jeev Rangala as Guest Appearance
- Struggler Sala
- Paaru as Appearance

=== Theater ===
- Jaago Mohan Pyare
- Laali Leela
- Sare Prawasi Ghadiche
