= Dili Supari Baikochi =

Marathi stage play

- Original language: Marathi

Premiere
- Place: India

Dili Supari Baikochi is a Marathi play directed by Santosh Pawar. The cast includes Supriya Pathare, Pradeep Patwardhan, Preeti Rajwade, and Kamlakar Satpute.

== Synopsis ==
A clerk is married to a very dominating woman. A few days before their wedding anniversary, she demands an expensive necklace which he has to get no matter what. But on the day of the anniversary the necklace is stolen. His furious wife throws him out of the house.

A notorious jewel thief is married to a woman who works at a dance bar and coincidentally it is their anniversary on the same day. But in this case, once he reaches home, his wife notices that it is a fake. She too throws him out of the house.

These two men coincidentally meet each other at a bar and start pouring their heart out and decide to "contract" each other to "fix" their wives.

== Cast ==
- Supriya Pathare
- Pradeep Patwardhan
- Preeti Kelkar
- Kamlakar Satpute

== Crew ==
- Director - Santosh Pawar
