= Sarva Line Vyasta Ahet =

- Theatrical release poster
- Directed by: Pradip Mestry
- Written by: Pradip Mestry
- Screenplay by: Ganesh Pandit; Shripad Joshi
- Produced by: Amol Shivram Utekar; Anjali Panchal; Minakshi Nimbalkar
- Starring: Siddhartha Jadhav; Mahesh Manjrekar; Sanskruti Balgude
- Cinematography: Sameer Athalye
- Edited by: Ashish Mhatre; Apurva Motiwale
- Music by: Music: Udhav Ojha; Score: Pankajj Padghan
- Production company: Stellaria Studios
- Distributed by: AA Films
- Release date: 1 February 2019
- Running time: 126 minutes
- Country: India
- Language: Marathi

Sarva Line Vyasta Ahet (transl. All lines are busy) is a 2019 Indian Marathi-language comedy film written and directed by Pradip Mestry, produced by Stellaria Studios. It starring Siddhartha Jadhav, Saurabh Gokhale, Mahesh Manjrekar, Sanskruti Balgude in lead roles. It was theatrically released on 1 February 2019.

== Cast ==
- Siddhartha Jadhav as Babya
- Sanskruti Balgude as Tanvi
- Saurabh Gokhale as Sameer
- Smita Shewale as Arpita
- Rani Aggarwal as Jigna
- Neetha Sheety as Sayli
- Satish Agashe as Sameer's father
- Madhavi Soman as Sameer's mother
- Hemangi Kavi as Priyanka
- Sandhya Kute as Jigna's mother
- Mahesh Manjrekar as Baba Gadbade
- Gaurav More as Tikku
- Shivaji Redkar as Babya's father
- Priyanka Mungekar as Babya's mother
- Hitesh Sampat as Jigna's father
- Kamlakar Satpute as Jhapadwale Munna

== Release ==
=== Theatrical ===
The film was theatrically released on 1 February 2019.

=== Home media ===
It was OTT released on Amazon Prime Video, available for streaming from 15 April 2020.

== Reception ==
=== Critical reception ===
A reviewer from The Times of India rated the film 1.5 out of 5, and wrote: "The film is faulty on so many levels that its not even funny." Kalpeshraj Kubal of Maharashtra Times also praised music and criticised story, screenplay.

== Music ==
Sarva Line Vyasta Ahet

Soundtrack album by Udhav Ojha, Pankajj Padghan
- Released: 2019
- Genre: Feature film soundtrack
- Length: 15:10
- Language: Marathi
- Label: Zee Music Company

Official audio
- Sarva Line Vyasta Ahet - Full Album on YouTube

The music is composed by Udhav Ojha and background score is provided by Pankajj Padghan. The lyrics of the songs are by Shrikant Bojewar and Valay Mulgund.

Track listing
| No. | Title | Singer (s) | Length |
|---|---|---|---|
| 1. | "Ek Number" | Avdhoot Gupte | 2:39 |
| 2. | "Dillachi Taar" | Adarsh Shinde | 2:50 |
| 3. | "Ya Re Ya Re" | Udhav Ojha, Ankita Bramhe, Ragini Kavthekar, Sagar Phadke | 2:31 |
| 4. | "Tu Morpankhi" | Swapnil Bhandodkar, Madhura Patkar | 3:06 |
| Total length: | | | 15:10 |
