= Nikhil Wairagar =

Indian film actor, and singer (born 1991)

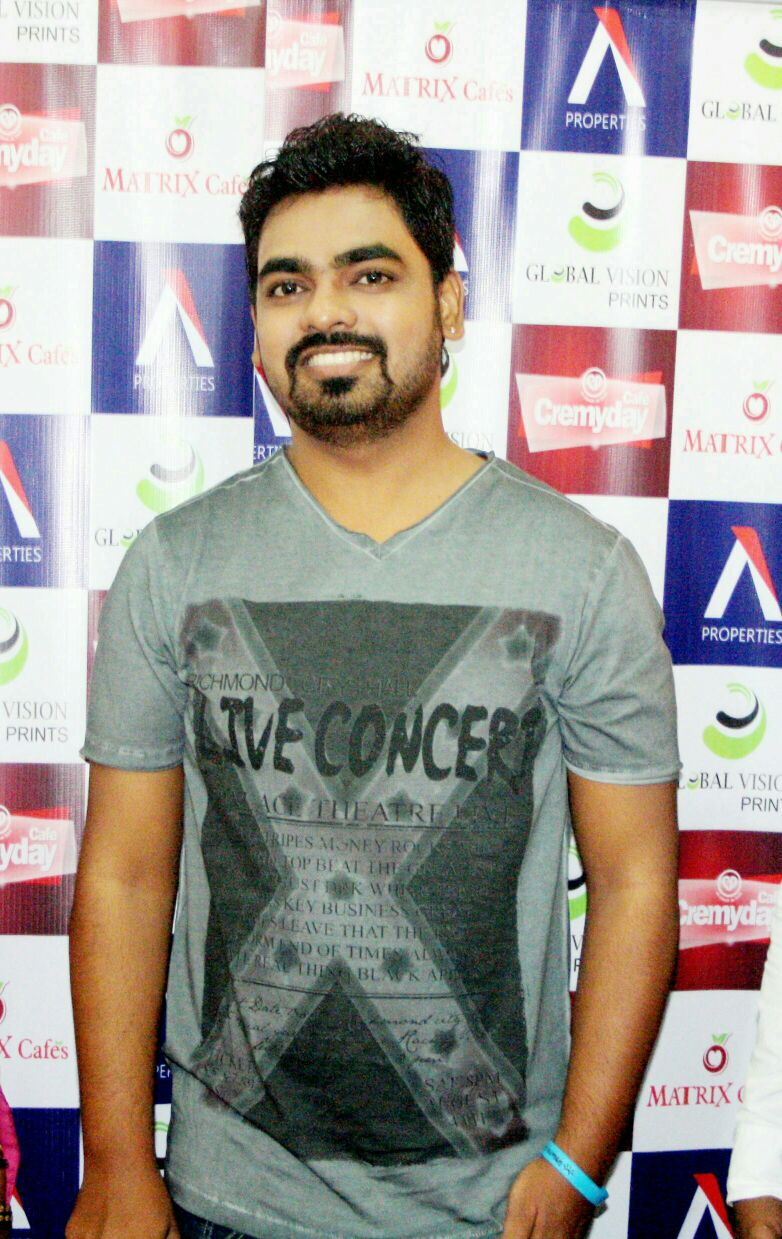
- Born: 12 February 1991 (age 35); Pune, Maharashtra, India
- Education: B.com.
- Alma mater: MMCC
- Occupation: Actor
- Years active: 2012 – present
- Known for: Movies- Headline, Ek Thriller Night & Jalsa
- Parent: Manoj Wiragar
- Relatives: Priyanka Wairagar & Nilesh Abraham
- Family: Wairagar

Nikhil Wairagar (born 12 February 1991) is an Indian actor and singer who is popularly known for his hit song "Bai Wadyawer Ya" from the feature film Jalsa.

== Early life ==
He was born in Pune on 12 February 1991. After completing his schooling in AW Sindhu Vidya Bhavan he pursued a commerce degree in Marathwada Mitra Mandal College of Commerce.

== Career ==
Wairagar started his career with English-language plays such as Fiddler on the Roof. He also did Marathi plays and eakankika from various colleges. He made his first Marathi film, Headline, which was based on youth issues such as good and bad uses of social media. The film included other actors such as Prasad Oak, Shashwati Pimplikar, and Pooja Pawar.

== Filmography ==
Year	Title	Role	Notes
2018	Gatmat		Post-Production
2016	Jalsa	Prem	
2015	Ek Thriller Night	Gautam	
2014	Headline	Nikhil	
2025	Ambat Shaukin	Lalit	Also director
