= Babo (2019 film) =

2019 Indian Marathi language film

- Directed by: Ramesh Chaudhary
- Story by: Arvind Jagtap
- Produced by: Sachin Baburao Pawar; Trupti Sachin Pawar
- Starring: Bharat Ganeshpure; Sayaji Shinde; Pratiksha Mungekar; Amol Kagne
- Cinematography: Veerdhaval Patil
- Edited by: Siddhesh More
- Release date: 31 May 2019
- Country: India
- Language: Marathi

Babo is a 2019 Indian Marathi language film written by Arvind Jagtap and directed by Ramesh Chaudhary. The background soundtrack was composed by Veerdhaval Patil and the soundtracks were composed by Harsh Karan Aditya (Trineeti Bros), Rohit Nagbhide, Atul Lohar. Mangesh Kangane penned the lyrics for the songs.

== Plot synopsis ==
People of a small hilly village find out in the news that a missile fire by Korea is heading towards their village and it could be their last day of living. Will the villagers let go of their internal difference and work together and solve the situation?

== Cast ==
- Manjiri Yashwant as Pintya's wife
- Kishore Chougule
- Madhu as Nandkishor Chougule
- Bharat Ganeshpure
- Kishore Kadam as Madan
- Vijay Kadam
- Amol Kagne as Bablu
- Pratiksha Mungekar as Munni
- Vijay Nikam as Astrologer
- Nisha Parulekar
- Shreya Pasalkar
- Sayaji Shinde as Bhaskar
- Vinod Shinde as Sanju
- Jaywant Wadkar as Father Of Pintyaa

== Reception ==
The Times of India said, "The story is based in a village where word spreads about a missile from Korea headed to crash in the area. The inhabitants fear their well-being and thinking it to be their last day alive, each one wants to spend it in the way they want to. However, in trying to explore this central plot, Babo opens up 15 sub-stories and all of them merely scratch the surface. Had it just focused on the geographical divide, the movie would have touched upon the issue of casteism effectively, with the treatment of a dark comedy."

== Soundtrack ==
Track listing
No.	Title	Singer(s)	Length
1.	"Myad Re"	Harwardhan Wavre, Kasturi Wavre	3:44
2.	"Babo title track"	Atul Lohar	2:37
3.	"Nachkam"	Nagesh Morvekar	4.14
Total length:			9:95
