= Pak Pak Pakaak =

2005 Indian film by Gautam Joglekar

- Theatrical release poster
- Directed by: Gautam Joglekar
- Written by: Sanjay Mone (Dialogue)
- Story by: Gautam Joglekar
- Produced by: Aashish Rego
- Starring: Saksham Kulkarni; Narayani Shastri; Nana Patekar; Jyoti Subhash
- Cinematography: Sanjay Jadhav
- Edited by: Imaran Khan; Faisal Khan
- Music by: K. C. Loy; Aashish Rego
- Production company: SOC Films Private Limited
- Release date: 15 April 2005
- Running time: 138 minutes
- Country: India
- Language: Marathi

Pak Pak Pakaak is a 2005 Indian Marathi-language children's adventure comedy-drama film directed by debutant Gautam Joglekar and produced by Aashish Rego under the banner of SOC Films. The film stars Nana Patekar, Saksham Kulkarni, Narayani Shastri, Jyoti Subhash in lead roles.

== Plot ==
A young mischievous boy Chikhluoo/Chiklu goes to a big forest which is haunted by a demon called Bhutya. Through many encounters, Chiklu befriends a ghost and their lives change forever.

== Cast ==
- Saksham Kulkarni as Chikhloo
- Nana Patekar as Sakharam Vaidya / Ganpatrao Kalbhor (Bhutya)
- Narayani Shastri as Saloo
- Jyoti Subhash as Chikhloo's grandmother
- Nandu Pol as Sarpanch
- Jitendra Joshi as Sarpanch's son
- Vijay Patwardhan as Chikhloo's schoolteacher
- Usha Nadkarni as Gaurakka
- Vidhyadhar Joshi as Exorcist
- Jyoti Joshi as Shanta
- Aaditi Deshpande as Amba
- Prachi Shah as Bhutya's wife
- Rekha Kamat as Tribal old woman

== Soundtrack ==
Songs

- "Title track" – Ravindra Sathe, Vinod Rathod, Yash Narvekar
- "Bhutyachye Naman" – Sudesh Bhonsale
- "Kashaa Paai" – Nana Patekar, Ravindra Sathe
- "Naanachi Taang" – Nana Patekar, Yash Narvekar, K. C. Roy
- "Aaji Mhanati" – Shreya Ghoshal
- "Tujh Lageen Saalu" – Vaishali Samant, Yash Narvekar

Lyrics

- K. C. Roy, Shrirang Godbole, Jeetendra Joshi
