= Jalsa (2016 film) =

- Marathi: जलसा
- Directed by: Ashutosh Raj
- Story by: Abhiram Bhadkamkar; Ashutosh Raj
- Produced by: Studio 9 Entertainment; Ashutosh Raj
- Starring: Bharat Ganeshpure; Ashutosh Raj; Nikhil Wairagar; Sagar Karande; Abhijit Chavan; Girija Joshi; Shital Ahirrao
- Release date: 21 October 2016
- Country: India
- Language: Marathi

Jalsa (transl. Fun) is a 2016 Marathi language comedy film directed by Ashutosh Raj. The film stars Bharat Ganeshpure, Sagar Karande, Abhijit Chavan, Ashutosh Raj, Nikhil Wairagar, Girija Joshi and Shital Ahirrao in pivotal roles. The story of the film is written by Ashutosh Raj and Abhiram Bhadkamkar. The film is produced by Studio 9 Entertainment and Ashutosh Raj. In this film, Mansi Naik will be seen performing the song "Bai Vadyavar Ya" as a tribute to legendary Marathi actor Nilu Phule. This song is composed by Sameer Saptiskar, choreographed by Rajesh Bidve and sung by Anand Shinde.

== Plot ==
The story of this film is about two youngsters Amar (Ashutosh Raj) & Prem (Nikhil Wairagar) from Pune from a rich family, who are keen on taking up acting as their career, much against the wish of their parents. But their maternal uncle (Bharat Ganeshpure) encourages and helps them.

== Cast ==
- Bharat Ganeshpure as Mama
- Ashutosh Raj as Amar
- Nikhil Wairagar as Prem
- Sagar Karande as Sangram Vetole
- Abhijeet Chavan as Nageshrao Vetole
- Girija Joshi as Karuna
- Shital Ahirrao as Nidhi
- Manasi Naik – Special appearance in song "Bai Vadyavar Ya"

== Soundtrack ==
No.	Title	Singer(s)	Length
1.	"Ba Wadyavar Ya"	Anand Shinde
2.	"Paul Panda Chorich"	Adarsh Shinde, Madhura Datar
