= Alyad Palyad =

- Theatrical release poster
- Directed by: Pritam SK Patil
- Screenplay by: Sanjay Navgire
- Story by: Pritam SK Patil
- Produced by: Shailesh Jain; Mahesh Nimbalkar
- Starring: Makarand Deshpande; Gaurav More; Saksham Kulkarni; Bhagyam Jain; Anushka Pimputkar; Sandeep Pathak; Suresh Vishwakarma; Chinmay Udgirkar
- Cinematography: Yogesh Koli
- Edited by: Saumitra Dharasulkar; Titiksha Bagul
- Music by: V R Rugved; Baji Amit
- Production company: SMP Productions
- Distributed by: Filmastra Studios
- Release date: 14 June 2024
- Running time: 129 minutes
- Country: India
- Language: Marathi
- Box office: ₹4.43 crore

Alyad Palyad is a 2024 Indian Marathi-language comedy horror film directed by Pritam SK Patil and produced by SMP Productions. The film starring Makarand Deshpande, Gaurav More, Sandeep Pathak, Saksham Kulkarni, Bhagyam Jain, Anushka Pimputkar, Suresh Vishwakarma, and Chinmay Udgirkar in lead roles.

== Cast ==
- Makarand Deshpande as Sidhayogi Sadhu
- Gaurav More as Chatur
- Saksham Kulkarni as Kishya
- Bhagyam Jain as Pankya
- Anushka Pimputkar as Nidhi
- Sandeep Pathak as Dilya
- Suresh Vishwakarma as Sarpanch
- Sunil Godbole as Guruji
- Pritam SK Patil as Chelushya
- Madhuri Pawar as Aamna (special appearance in the song "Raangda Naach")
- Chinmay Udgirkar as Sarkar
- Pooja Wagh as Possessed women

== Soundtrack ==
Alyad Palyad

Soundtrack album by V R Rugved, Baji Amit
- Released: 19 June 2024
- Genre: Feature film soundtrack
- Length: 10:01
- Language: Marathi
- Label: Panorama Music

Official audio
- Alyad Palyad - Full Album on YouTube

Track listing
No.	Title	Lyrics	Music	Singer (s)	Length
1.	"Raangda Naach"	Shardul	V R Rugved	Shardul, Rucha Kulkarni	3:06
2.	"Kalokhachi Ratra"	Nayum Pathan	Baji Amit	JayHari, Mahesh Nimbalkar	3:53
3.	"Alyad Palyad (Title track)"	Nayum Pathan	V R Rugved	V R Rugved, Mahesh Nimbalkar	3:25
Total length:					10.01

== Release ==
=== Theatrical ===
The film was theatrically released on 14 June 2024. It was released in more than 200 theaters.

=== Marketing ===
The trailer was released on 27 May 2024 on social media.

== Reception ==
=== Critical reception ===
Shrikant Bhosale of ABP Majha rated 3.0/5 and wrote "The premise of the film feels a bit slow as the background of the story is being built. In comparison, the second half is fast paced and gripping. If the film had picked up speed in the first half, the second half could have been painted more." Kalpeshraj Kubal of Maharashtra Times rated 3.0/5 and praised actors performances, mentioning their ability to evoke laughter, scares, and deliver their roles confidently and beautifully. However criticizes certain aspects of the movie, such as inconsistencies in dialogues, dialects, tone, and setting. Santosh Bhingarde of Sakal rated 3.0/5 and describes "despite the slow start, the movie as an engaging horror film, indicating that it successfully captures and maintains the audience's interest in the latter part of the story." Jyoti Venkatesh of Cine Blitz rated 2/5 and expressing dissatisfaction with the film despite acknowledging its well-executed cinematography that aligns with its genre or style (dark locales). However, the main critique revolves around the film being perceived as bland and tacky. He feels that the lack of significant plot twists or turns makes the viewing experience monotonous and not engaging. He find the film to be uninspiring and tedious due to its predictable nature and absence of gripping plot developments. Reshma Raikwar of Loksatta wrote "All the sarcasm made for horror is wasted on comedy. Therefore, it should be seen as a comedy horror film without going too far."

=== Box office ===
The film was collected ₹20 lakh on its opening day and earned ₹1.075 crore in three days, and surpassed the ₹1 crore mark by the fourth day. By the end of the seventh day, its collection reached ₹2.19 crore, and it earned an additional ₹1.81 crore by the eighth day. In total, the film amassed ₹4.60 crore.

=== Accolades ===
Year	Award	Category	Nominee (s)	Result	Ref.
2024	Aaryans Sanman	Best Art Director	Yogesh Ingale	Nominated	
2024	Aaryans Sanman	Best Makeup Artist	Abhishek Pawar	Nominated	
2024	Aaryans Sanman	Best Sound Designer	Swarup Joshi	Nominated	

== Sequel ==
Producers of the movie Shailesh Jain, Mahesh Nimbalkar announced the sequel Alyad Palyad 2 in July 2024.
