= Sakhe Ga Saajani =

2026 Indian Marathi-language romantic drama film

- Directed by: Abhishek Jawkar
- Written by: Abhishek Jawkar
- Produced by: Abhishek Jawkar; Aditya Vasudev Gharat; Abhijeet Khandkekar; Shreyash Vilas Sawant
- Starring: Prarthana Behere; Pooja Sawant; Abhijeet Khandkekar
- Cinematography: Abhishek Jawkar
- Edited by: Abhishek Jawkar
- Music by: Vijay Bhate
- Production company: Red Bulb Studios
- Distributed by: Cinepolis India
- Release date: 3 April 2026
- Running time: 130 minutes
- Country: India
- Language: Marathi

Sakhe Ga Saajani (transl. Dear Friend) is a 2026 Indian Marathi-language romantic drama film written, directed, edited, and co-produced by Abhishek Jawkar. The film was produced under Red Bulb Studios and stars Prarthana Behere, Pooja Sawant, and Abhijeet Khandkekar in the lead roles.

It was theatrically released on 3 April 2026 and distributed by Cinepolis India.

== Plot ==
Namita Bhave is a 32-year-old doctor who has decided against marriage. Her parents, however, have selected a prospective groom based in the United States. Her close friend Anju takes her to Thailand on what Namita believes is a leisure trip. There, they encounter Siddharth, who is, unknown to Namita, the same man her parents have chosen for her. As the trip unfolds, Namita realises that Anju has developed feelings for Siddharth, setting off a conflict between friendship, love, and sacrifice.

== Cast ==
- Prarthana Behere as Namita Bhave
- Pooja Sawant as Anju
- Abhijeet Khandkekar as Siddharth
- Shriram Pendse as Namita's father
- Shubhangi Gokhale as Namita's mother
- Daksha Nagarkar as Kavya

== Production ==
The film was written, directed, and co-produced by Abhishek Jawkar, who also served as cinematographer and editor. Jawkar, a Mumbai-born filmmaker, previously co-produced the Marathi film Dabba Ais Paise (2015) and directed the Hindi film Missing on a Weekend (2016) under his production banner Red Bulb Studios, which he founded after working in film distribution and documentary production.

Principal photography took place partly in Thailand.

== Soundtrack ==
The music is composed by Vijay Bhate, while the lyrics are penned by Lakhan Chaudhari. Abhijeet Sawant has made his comeback to Marathi cinema after 13 years by singing the title track.

No.	Title	Singer(s)	Length
1.	"Sakhe Ga Saajani (Title Track)"	Abhijeet Sawant	3:06
2.	"DJ Cha Bass"	Karan Sawant, Shweta Thakur	2:20

== Release and reception ==
Sakhe Ga Saajani was announced in July 2025 with a poster featuring the film's three lead actors, though their names and faces were not disclosed at the time. The lead cast was officially unveiled in February 2026. The film was theatrically released on 3 April 2026.

=== Critical response ===
The film received mixed-to-negative reviews from critics.

Anub George of The Times of India gave the film 2 out of 5 stars, calling it an "extended advertisement for Thai tourism" and stating that it "provides a twist on the love triangle which takes some time to ramp up, but ultimately unravels into twists on twists." Kalpeshraj Kubal of Maharashtra Times gave the film 2.5 stars and wrote, "Despite the hard work of the actors, the sweetness of relationships and the concept of travel, the film cannot reach the desired heights due to weak screenplay and inadequate technical presentation."
