= Shreya Bugde =

Indian television actress (b. 1988)

Shreya Bugade-Sheth
- Born: 2 February 1988 (age 38); Pune, Maharashtra
- Occupation: Actress
- Known for: Chala Hawa Yeu Dya; Fu Bai Fu; Tu Tithe Me
- Spouse: Nikhil Sheth (m. 2015)

Shreya Bugade-Sheth (born 2 February 1988) is an Indian television actress. She is known for her comedy skits in Chala Hawa Yeu Dya.

She honored with Newsmakers Achievers Awards 2022.

== Early life ==
Shreya was born on 2 February 1988 in Pune, but brought up in Mumbai. Her mother's name is Nutan Bugade. She did her schooling from St. Xavier High School and completed college from Mithibai College, Mumbai.

== Career ==
She started her career in acting as a child artist from the Marathi drama Vatevarti Kacha Ga. She acted lots of plays in various languages. She made her debut with Tu Tithe Me serial in 2012. She also acted in many serials like Asmita, Tu Tithe Me, Fu Bai Fu, etc. She rose to prominence after her appearance in Chala Hawa Yeu Dya. She is a sole female lead in the show.

== Personal life ==
In 2015, she married Nikhil Sheth, the Associate Creative Head of Zee Marathi.

== Television ==
Year	Title	Role	Language
2010	Bairi Piya	Chandana	Hindi
2010	Thoda Hai Bas Thode Ki Zaroorat Hai	Sangana	Hindi
2011	Chhuta Chheda		Gujarati
2011	Ekach Hya Janmi Janu	Shrikant's Sister	Marathi
2012-2013	Tu Tithe Me	Manjusha Holkar	Marathi
2013	Majhe Man Tujhe Jhale	College Professor	Marathi
2013-2014	Fu Bai Fu	Contestant	Marathi
2014	Asmita	Episodic Role	Marathi
2014-2025	Chala Hawa Yeu Dya	Various Characters	Marathi
2015-2016	Albeli - Kahani Pyaar Ki	Geet's wife	Marathi
2019	Tujhyat Jeev Rangala	Guest	Marathi
2019	Zing Zing Zingat	Guest	Marathi
2019	Kanala Khada	Guest	Marathi
2020	Dancing Queen	Guest	Marathi
2022	Kitchen Kallakar	Host	Marathi
2022	Bus Bai Bas	Guest	Marathi
2024	Drama Juniors	Host	Marathi

== Stage works ==
Work	Language	Notes
Jo Bhi Hoga Dekha Jayega	Hindi	
Samudra	Marathi	
Medha & Zoombish	English	
Rabdi	Hindi	
