= Ambat Shaukin =

2025 Marathi film by Nikhil Wairagar

- आंबट शौकीन
- Directed by: Nikhil Wairagar
- Written by: Akshay Tanksale; Amit Bendre
- Produced by: Ranjana Mohit Lakhotia; Prafful Kakani; Anagh Bhutada; Nilesh Rathi
- Starring: Pooja Sawant; Akshay Tanksale; Kiran Gaikwad; Nikhil Wairagar; Bhau Kadam; Parth Bhalerao
- Cinematography: Madhuram J Solanki
- Edited by: Rohaan Pattil
- Music by: Sai-Piyush
- Production companies: Hexvision Entertainment; Labros Entertainment; SS and KL Brothers Productions; Big Brain Productions
- Distributed by: Panorama Studios
- Release date: June 13, 2025
- Country: India
- Language: Marathi

Ambat Shaukin (transl. Tangy Desires) is a 2025 Indian Marathi-language comedy drama directed by Nikhil Wairagar. The film stars Pooja Sawant, Akshay Tanksale, Kiran Gaikwad, Nikhil Wairagar, Bhau Kadam and Parth Bhalerao.

The film addresses the issue of sextortion and digital deception through a comedic narrative. It was released theatrically on 13 June 2025. Upon release, the film received mostly negative reviews.

== Plot ==
Three quirky and close friends simultaneously develop feelings for the same mysterious girl. What begins as a lighthearted rivalry among friends quickly spirals into chaos when the trio unknowingly falls into a cleverly laid honey trap. Amid the laughs and confusion, the film exposes the dangers of digital deception, exploring themes of trust, friendship, and online safety.

== Cast ==
- Pooja Sawant as Janvi
- Akshay Tanksale as Varun
- Kiran Gaikwad as Reddy
- Nikhil Wairagar as Lalit
- Prarthana Behere as Asmita
- Amey Wagh as Amey
- Bhau Kadam as Bhau
- Parth Bhalerao as Digya
- Abhijeet Khandkekar as PI Bhamre
- Monalisa Bagal
- Shrikant Yadav
- Manini Durge as Neha
- Chinmay Sant as Pavya
- Rahul Magdum as Phadke
- Aashay Kulkarni
- Gautami Patil
- Shubhankar Ekbote
- Sviya Londhe
- Pratibha Bhagat
- Prachi Palave
- Pittya Pradeshi
- Daya Gaikwad
- Akya Jadhav
- Aaryak Pathak
- Vinod Khedekar
- Sagar Dhamale
- Vaishnavi Loyare
- Kedar Damodar Soman

== Release and reception ==
Ambat Shaukin trailer was released in May 2025. It had theatrical release on 13 June 2025. The film was later made available for digital streaming on Amazon Prime Video.

=== Critical response ===
The Times of India critic Mihir Bhanage gave the film 2 out of 5 stars and wrote, "It deserves full marks for the effort and passion, but half of that for its execution."

== Soundtrack ==
| No. | Title | Lyrics | Music | singer(s) | Length |
|---|---|---|---|---|---|
| 1. | "Tambu Pirmacha Petla" | Sandesh Raut | Sai-Piyush | Piyush Kulkarni, Onkarswaroop Bagde, Ajit Vispute | 3:40 |
