= Gavthi =

- Theatrical release poster
- Directed by: Anand Kumar Konnar (Anddy)
- Story by: Siva Kumar. R
- Produced by: Siva Kumar. R
- Starring: Shrikant Patil; Yogita Chavan; Nagesh Bhosale; Vandana Waknis; Gaurav More; Kishor Kadam; Kushal Badrike; Kishor Chougule; Ankur Wadhave; Pankaj Vishnu; Sadanand Yadav
- Cinematography: Ajeeth (Yuvasamrat)
- Edited by: Sanjay Ingle
- Music by: Ashwin Bhandare
- Production company: RB Productions
- Release date: 30 March 2018
- Running time: 152 min
- Country: India
- Language: Marathi

Gavthi is a 2018 Indian Marathi-language drama film directed by Anand Kumar Konnar. The film stars Shrikant Patil, Yogita Chavan, Nagesh Bhosale in the lead roles. The film was released on 30 March 2018.

== Cast ==
- Shrikant Patil as Gajanan aka Gajya
- Yogita Chavan as Gauri
- Nagesh Bhosale as Gauri's father
- Vandana Waknis
- Gaurav More
- Kishor Kadam as Gajanan's father
- Kushal Badrike
- Kishor Chougule
- Ankur Wadhave
- Pankaj Vishnu
- Sadanand Yadav
