= Chaandi =

- Directed by: Sameer Naik
- Written by: Anil Pawar
- Based on: MHAIS by Pu. La. Deshpande
- Produced by: Dnyaneshwar Govekar; Anil Pawar
- Cinematography: Sameer Athalye
- Music by: Praveen Kuwar
- Release date: 14 June 2013
- Country: India
- Language: Marathi

Chaandi is a 2013 Indian film based on the 1957 short story, "Mhais", by Marathi writer Purushottam Laxman Deshpande. Chaandi shows the chaos created by a buffalo, when she comes under a street bus which is going to Mumbai from a small village in Konkan. What follows is a chaotic drama comedy, between the owners of the buffalo and the passengers in the bus, which depicts typical demeanour, nature and attitude of the Marathi manoos in konkan and local politics.

== Casting ==
- Ramesh Deo
- Rupali Bhosale
- Vaibhav Mangle
- Deepak Shirke
- Chetan Dalvi
- Kishore Nandlaskar
- Sanjivani Jadhav
- Ganessh Divekar
- Bhalchandra Kadam
- Prabhakar More
- Pradeep Patwardhan
- Rajashree nikam
- Santosh Pawar
- Vikas Samudre
- Sandesh Upashyam
- Chetana Bhat
- Anil Sutar
- Uday Sabnis

== Premiere ==
The movie was officially released on 1 June 2013, all over Maharashtra, India.

== Production ==
The original short story of Mhais is based on an incident of a buffalo being knocked down by a State transport Bus, on its way to Mumbai from a village in Konkan. This results in a big show, as the real owner of the buffalo not allowing the Bus to proceed further, till police party arrives for investigation. The situation goes on to show the reactions of the stranded bus passengers and their arguments with villagers, coming in support of the owner of the buffalo.

To present this film in cinematic format, the director duo Sameer Naik & Dnyaneshwar Govekar have taken the liberties to add some more characters, which were not in the original story and hence clearly deviating from the original story. The film begins well with the three characters from a village Savarde, off Chiplun, on Mumbai Goa highway . So, we find Gaja Khot (Bhau kadam) and Sane (Pradeep Patwardhan) trying to overpower the buffalo owned by Dharma Mandavkar (Prabhakar More), which goes out of control.

In the meantime, we watch the scene at another village, where a senior citizen and well known personality from the village Bapusaheb More(Ramesh Deo) getting ready to proceed to Mumbai, to begin his indefinite fast, over his demand of reviving the Marathi schools in villages. He hires a ST Bus and looks for support from other villagers.

Taking advantage of this situation, different people from the village, take a free ride on the bus to Mumbai to attend to their personal work . So, we find a big team of characters led by Bapusaheb More, followed by chatterbox Dattu(Vaibhav Mangale), his flirt young sister Keshar ( Rupali Bhosale) and a forced character of Gampu, played by Santosh Pawar, to create a place for hero in this film. Writer Anil Pawar has thus taken unnecessary liberties to show the affair of Gampu, besides Keshar also being crazy after him. Finally, the big troupe leave by bus, till it comes to a halt, after knocking down Dharma's buffalo on the road off. Savarde.
