= Shreemantagharchi Suun =

Marathi-language drama TV series

- Genre: Drama
- Directed by: Kedar Vaidya
- Starring: See below
- Country of origin: India
- Original language: Marathi
- No. of episodes: 208

Production
- Producer: Vidyadhar Pathare
- Production locations: Mumbai, Maharashtra, India
- Camera setup: Multi-camera
- Running time: 22 minutes
- Production company: Iris Production

Original release
- Network: Sony Marathi
- Release: 26 October 2020 – 10 July 2021

Shreemantagharchi Soon (transl. Daughter-in-law of a rich family) is an Indian Marathi language drama series which aired on Sony Marathi. It starred Yashoman Apte and Rupal Nand in lead roles. It is produced by Vidyadhar Pathare and directed by Kedar Vaidya under the banner of Iris Production. It premiered from 26 October 2020 and ended on 10 July 2021 completing 208 episodes.

== Plot ==
This show challenges the general social notion ‘Marry daughters in rich families but have daughters-in-law from a poor family’. This notion has been followed since generations and it show peeps into the truth of this ideology. The show conveys that people should not be judged by their class and family backgrounds. A kind-hearted person can belong to any class of the society. The story is set on the backdrops of Mumbai. The Karnik family is a joint family residing in Mumbai. Financially they are well to do but not very rich. The protagonist of the show Atharva Karnik is the youngest among 2 brothers. The family consist of father (Sudhir Karnik), mother (Aruna Karnik), 2 sons, Shekhar karnik (Atharva’s uncle) and Devika karnik (Atharva’s aunt). Atharva is in love with Ananya who hails from a rich family. Atharva’s mother is already tolerating the tantrums of rich daughter in law and co-sister in law and the above mentioned social notion seems to be true from her perspective. Atharva and Ananya’s relation is put to test on every front and Atharva’s family find themselves in situations where the age-old claim seems to come true. But Ananya stands tall by the family and faces every of the situation trying to prove that rich girls do make good daughter in laws.

== Cast ==
- Yashoman Apte as Atharv
- Rupal Nand as Ananya
- Aishwarya Narkar as Aruna
- Falguni Rajani / Supriya Pathare as Devika
- Avinash Narkar
- Manasi Singh
- Mugdha Godbole
- Shrirang Deshmukh
- Siddhesh Prabhakar
- Sudesh Mhashalikar as Jagdish
- Dipali Jadhav as Simran
