= Piya Ka Aangan =

- Genre: Drama
- Created by: Green Communications Pvt Ltd
- Written by: Bobby Khan- Akashaditya Lama
- Directed by: Manoj Nautiyal
- Starring: see below
- Opening theme: "Piya Ka Aangan"
- Country of origin: India
- Original language: Hindi
- No. of seasons: 1
- No. of episodes: 192

Production
- Producer: Jagmohan Bhanver
- Camera setup: Multi-camera
- Running time: 30 minutes

Original release
- Network: DD National
- Release: 16 February 2009

Piya Ka Aangan is an Indian drama series based on the story of Shlok and Swati falling in love. Swati was initially married to Shlok's elder brother Sameer, who was killed by the main antagonist Vicky Bajaj. Due to circumstances Shlok had to marry Swati without her consent to save her from Vicky Bajaj. The story deals with how they fall in love with each other and how they face their families. The series premiered on 16 February 2009.

== Cast ==
- Hemangi Kavi (Swati)
- Akshat Gupta (Samir)
- Sunny Gujral (Ranavir)
- Rajeev Verma (Udai Dabral)
- Amita Nangia (Nandini)
- Yusuf Hussain (Sherawat)
- Vineeta Malik (Dadi)
- Akashaditya Lama (Vicky Bajaj)
- Ankita Shrivastav (Mantasha)
- Tanima Bhattacharya (Christina)
- Raunaq Ahuja (Shlok)
- Nissar khan ( virendra pratap dabral)
