= Krishna Prakash Bahadur =

Indian writer (1924–2000)

Krishna babu Agarwal
- Born: 21 February 1924; Allahabad, Uttar Pradesh
- Died: 10 December 2000; Lucknow
- Occupation: Writer

Krishna Prakesh Bahadur (K.P. Bahadur) (1924–2000) was an Indian writer from Allahabad, India who authored a large number of books, including many works of history, philosophy and poetry.

== Biography ==
Krishna Prakash Bahadur was born on 21 February 1924 in Allahabad. He attended St Joseph's and St Mary's and La Martiniere in Lucknow, and later received his M.A. degree from the University of Allahabad. He married Prem Lata Bahadur, also an author.

Bahadur is the author of over fifty works of religion, philosophy, history, sociology, fiction, humour, and translation, as well as children's books.

Bahadur died in Lucknow on 10 December 2000.

== Awards ==
- Vidya Visharada
- Vidya Ratmakara
- "Proud Past Alumnus" of the University of Allahabad.

== Major works (incomplete) ==
- Folk tales of Uttar Pradesh, New Delhi: Sterling Publishers, 1972, 117pp.
- Rāmacaritmānasa: a Study in Perspective. Delhi: Ess Ess Publications, 1976, 365pp.
- The wisdom of Yoga: a study of Patanjali's Yoga Sutra, New Delhi: Sterling Publishers, 1977, 116pp. ISBN 0-8002-0185-X
- Population Crisis in India, New Delhi : National Publishing House, 1977, 180pp.
- Castes, Tribes and Cultures of India, 7 vols, Delhi: Ess Ess Publications, 1977–1985. (Vols 8–9 by Sukhdev Singh Chib)
- The Wisdom of Nyaaya, New Delhi: Sterling, c1978, 246pp.
- The Wisdom of Saankhya, New Delhi: Sterling Publishers, 1978, 222pp. ISBN 0-8002-0186-8.
- Upaniṣads: Hindu scriptures of spiritual truth (ed), New Delhi: Heritage, 1979, 308pp.
- The Wisdom of Vaisheshika, New Delhi : Sterling Publishers, c1979, 207pp.
- The Seen and the Unseen, Lucknow : Anuj Publications, 1980, 116pp.
- A History of Indian Civilisation, 7 vols, New Delhi: Ess Ess Publications, 1979–1983.
- The Wisdom of Vedanta, New Delhi: Sterling Publishers, c1983, 412pp.
- Rajiv Gandhi: Man with Destiny, New Delhi: Ess Ess Publications, 1985, 154pp. ISBN 81-7000-004-1
- History of the Freedom Movement in India, 5 Vols, New Delhi: Ess Ess Publications, 1986–1989.
- The Wisdom of Yoga: a Study of Patanjali's Yoga Sutra, Sterling Publishers Private Ltd 1988 ISBN 81-207-0330-8
- A Source Book of Hindu Philosophy, New Delhi: Ess Ess Publications, 1995, 403pp. ISBN 81-7000-174-9
- The Raj and After, New Delhi: Ess Ess Publications, 1996, 244 pp. ISBN 81-7000-170-6
- A New Look at Kabir. New Delhi: Ess Ess Publications, 1997, 288pp. ISBN 81-7000-205-2
- Sufi Mysticism, New Delhi: Ess Ess Publications, 1998, 265pp. ISBN 81-7000-250-8.
- The Poems of Suradusa by Suradusa, Knishna Prakash Bahadur Abinhay publications. ISBN 81-7017-369-8

=== Translations into English ===
- The Rasikapriyā of Keshavadāsa, Delhi: Motilal Banarsidass, 1972, 248pp.
- Selections from Rāmacandrikā of Keśavadāsa, Delhi: Motilal Banarsidass, 1976, 177pp.
- Love poems of Ghananand, Delhi: Motilal Banarsidass, 1977. 202pp. ISBN 81-208-0836-3
- The Parrot and the Starling Delhi: Motilal Banarsidass, 1977, 183pp. ISBN 0-8426-1034-0
- One Hundred Songs of India, Delhi: Motilal Banarsidass, 1978, 198pp.
- Bangla Love Poems. Dreamland Publications, 1978, 97pp. (A collection of medieval Vaishnavite poems)
- The Satasaī/ Bihārī , London: Penguin/Unesco, 1992, 404pp. ISBN 0-14-044576-5
- Mīrā Bāī and her Padas, New Delhi: Munshiram Manoharlal, 1998, 115
