= Nilesh Sable =

Indian actor

Dr. Nilesh Sable
- Born: 30 June 1983 (age 43); Kolhapur, Maharashtra
- Occupations: Actor; television host
- Years active: 2010–present
- Known for: Maharashtracha Superstar; Fu Bai Fu; Chala Hawa Yeu Dya
- Spouse: Gauri Sable (m. 2013)

Nilesh Sable is a Marathi TV presenter and film actor from Maharashtra, India. He is known for Marathi TV show Chala Hawa Yeu Dya.

== Early life ==
He has completed his secondary school from Mahatma Gandhi Vidyalaya, Dahiwadi and Junior college from Mahatma Gandhi Vidyalaya Junior college, Dahiwadi. He has a Masters of Science in Ayurveda.

== Personal life ==
Nilesh was married with his college friend Gauri Sable in 2013.

== Career ==
Nilesh Sable began his acting career after winning the Zee Marathi reality series, Maharashtracha Superstar in 2010. He then appeared on series such as Home Minister and Fu Bai Fu. He made Marathi film debut in Navra Majha Bhavra. He is the host of Zee Marathi comic Show Chala Hawa Yeu Dya. He is also part of Hastay Na Hasaylach Pahije Comedy Show on Colors Marathi.

== Filmography ==
=== Films ===
Year	Title	Role	Director	Ref.
2011	Dubhang	Tapashya	Mahesh Kothare	
2004	Navra Majha Bhavra	Reporter	Kamlakar Gujal	

=== Television ===
Year	Title	Role	Channels	Ref.
2010	Maharashtracha Superstar	Contestant	Zee Marathi	
2010-2014	Fu Bai Fu	Host	Zee Marathi	
2011	Home Minister	Host	Zee Marathi	
2012	Ek Mohor Abol	Negative role	Colors Marathi	
2014–2024	Chala Hawa Yeu Dya	Director / Host	Zee Marathi	
2020	Lav Re Toh Video	Host	Zee Yuva	
2024	Hastay Na Hasaylach Pahije	Host	Colors Marathi	
2024	Bigg Boss Marathi 5	Host	Colors Marathi	

== Awards ==
Year	Awards	Category	Role	Show	Ref.
2010	Zee Marathi Utsav Natyancha Awards	Best Anchor	Host	Fu Bai Fu	
2014	Zee Marathi Utsav Natyancha Awards	Best Anchor	Host	Chala Hawa Yeu Dya	
2015	Zee Marathi Utsav Natyancha Awards	Best Anchor	Host	Chala Hawa Yeu Dya	
2016	Zee Marathi Utsav Natyancha Awards	Best Anchor	Host	Chala Hawa Yeu Dya	
2017	Zee Marathi Utsav Natyancha Awards	Best Anchor	Host	Chala Hawa Yeu Dya	
