= Abhijeet Khandkekar =

Indian actor and host (born. 1986)

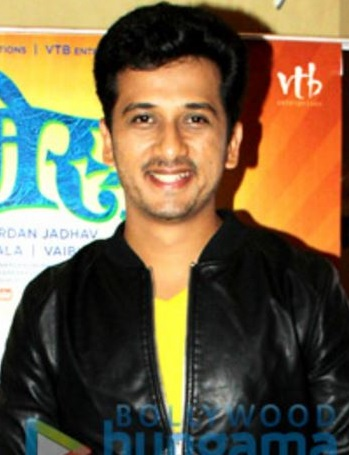
- Abhijeet in 2015
- Born: 7 July 1986 (age 40); Nashik, Maharashtra, India
- Occupations: Actor; RJ; Host
- Years active: 2010 - present
- Known for: Maziya Priyala Preet Kalena; Majhya Navaryachi Bayko; Maharashtracha Superstar
- Spouse: Sukhada Deshpande (m. 2013)

Abhijeet Khandkekar is a RJ, anchor and Marathi television and film actor, known for Majhya Navaryachi Bayko, Maziya Priyala Preet Kalena and Tuzech Mi Geet Gaat Aahe.

== Personal life ==
Abhijeet married Sukhada Khandkekar in 2013, who is also an actor.

== Media image ==
He was ranked twentieth in The Times of India's Top 20 Most Desirable Men of Maharashtra in 2017. He was ranked eleventh in The Times of India's Top 15 Most Desirable Men on Marathi Television in 2018. He was ranked twentieth in The Times of India's Top 30 Most Desirable Men of Maharashtra in 2019.

== Career ==
Abhijeet was born on 7 July 1986 in Nashik, Maharashtra and got his first break in Maziya Priyala Preet Kalena which was aired on Zee Marathi in 2010–2011. He made his debut in film with Jai Maharashtra Dhaba Bhatinda film. He has also played various roles in Bhay, Baba, Me Pan Sachin, Mamachya Gavala Jaaoo Yaa, etc. He was last seen in Zee Marathi serial Majhya Navaryachi Bayko from 2016-2021.

== Filmography ==
=== Television ===
| Year | Title | Role | Ref. |
|---|---|---|---|
| 2009 - 2010 | Maharashtracha Superstar: Season 1 | Contestant | |
| 2010 - 2011 | Maziya Priyala Preet Kalena | Abhijeet Pendse | |
| 2012 | Madhu Ethe Ani Chandra Tithe | Akash | |
| 2016 - 2021 | Majhya Navaryachi Bayko | Gurunath Subhedar | |
| 2018 | Zee Marathi Utsav Natyancha Awards | Host | |
| 2018 | Kanala Khada | Himself as a Guest | |
| 2019 | Zee Marathi Utsav Natyancha Awards | Host | |
| 2020 | Maharashtracha Superstar: Season 2 | Host | |
| 2021 - 2022 | Criminals: Chahul Gunhegaranchi | Host | |
| 2022 - 2024 | Tuzech Mi Geet Gaat Aahe | Malhar Kamat | |
| 2022 | Aata Hou De Dhingana | Contestant | |

=== Films ===
| Year | Title | Role | Ref. |
|---|---|---|---|
| 2013 | Jai Maharashtra Dhaba Bhatinda | Sayaji Nimbalkar | |
| 2014 | Mamachya Gavala Jaaoo Yaa | Nandu | |
| 2015 | Dhol Taashe | Amey Karkhanis | |
| 2017 | Dhyanimani | Sameer | |
| 2018 | Bhay | Gokul | |
| 2019 | Baba | Rajan | |
| 2019 | Me Pan Sachin | Raja | |
| 2020 | Idiot Box | | |
| 2022 | Dharmaveer | Dadaji Bhuse | |
| 2023 | Phakaat | Siddharth Thakur | |
| 2024 | Dharmaveer 2 | Dadaji Bhuse | |
| 2025 | Devmanus | Vilas Jedhe | |
| 2025 | Ambat Shaukin | Bhamre | |
| 2026 | Sakhe Ga Saajani | Siddharth | |
| 2026 | Mardini | Inspector Vikrant Surve | |
| 2026 | Lagna Aani Barach Kahi | Aniruddha Patil | |

=== Web series ===
| Year | Title | Role | Platform | Ref. |
|---|---|---|---|---|
| 2021 | Soppa Nasta Kahi | Siddharth | Planet Marathi | |
| 2022 | Duranga | Vikas Sarode | ZEE5 | |

== Awards and nominations ==
| Year | Awards | Category | Role | Show | Result | Ref. |
|---|---|---|---|---|---|---|
| 2010 | Zee Marathi Utsav Natyancha Awards | Best Actor | Abhijeet Pendse | Maziya Priyala Preet Kalena | Won | |
| 2010 | Zee Marathi Utsav Natyancha Awards | Best Newcomer Male | Abhijeet Pendse | Maziya Priyala Preet Kalena | Won | |
| 2010 | Zee Marathi Utsav Natyancha Awards | Best On-screen Couple | Abhijeet-Shamika (as Abhijeet Khandkekar - Mrunal Dusanis | Maziya Priyala Preet Kalena | Won | |
| 2017 | Zee Marathi Utsav Natyancha Awards | Best Character - Male | Gurunath Subhedar | Majhya Navaryachi Bayko | Nominated | |
| 2017 | Zee Marathi Utsav Natyancha Awards | Best Negative Role - Male | Gurunath Subhedar | Majhya Navaryachi Bayko | Won | |
| 2016 | Zee Marathi Utsav Natyancha Awards | Best Character - Male | Gurunath Subhedar | Majhya Navaryachi Bayko | Nominated | |
| 2018 | Zee Marathi Utsav Natyancha Awards | Best Negative Role - Male | Gurunath Subhedar | Majhya Navaryachi Bayko | Nominated | |
| 2019 | Zee Marathi Utsav Natyancha Awards | Best Negative Role - Male | Gurunath Subhedar | Majhya Navaryachi Bayko | Nominated | |
| 2020 | 2nd Majja Digital Awards | Majjedar Digital Kalakar | Gurunath Subhedar | Majhya Navaryachi Bayko | Won | |
| 2021 | Zee Marathi Utsav Natyancha Awards | Special Mention | Gurunath Subhedar | Majhya Navaryachi Bayko | Honored | |
