= Fu Bai Fu =

Indian Marathi-language Comedy TV show

- Written by: Nilesh Sable; Sachin Mote
- Directed by: Sachin Goswami
- Presented by: Sai Tamhankar (season 2); Nilesh Sable (seasons 1-8); Vaidehi Parshurami (season 9)
- Country of origin: India
- Original language: Marathi
- No. of seasons: 9

Production
- Camera setup: Multi-camera
- Running time: 45-60 minutes
- Production company: Frames Production

Original release
- Network: Zee Marathi
- Release: 14 April 2010 – 17 December 2022

Fu Bai Fu is an Indian Marathi language comedy reality show which aired on Zee Marathi from 2010 to 2014.

== Seasons ==
| Season | Name | Originally Broadcast | | Days | Host | Judges | Winner |
| Season | Name | First aired | Last aired | Days | Host | Judges | Winner |
|---|---|---|---|---|---|---|---|
| 1 | Fu Bai Fu | 14 April 2010 | 15 August 2010 | Wed-Thu | Nilesh Sable | Nirmiti Sawant; Swapnil Joshi; Smita Talwalkar | Vaibhav Mangle; Vishakha Subhedar |
| 2 | Fu Bai Fu | 25 August 2010 | 26 December 2010 | Wed-Thu | Nilesh Sable; Sai Tamhankar | Nirmiti Sawant; Swapnil Joshi | Anshuman Vichare; Atul Todankar |
| 3 | Fu Bai Fu | 11 May 2011 | 25 September 2011 | Wed-Thu | Nilesh Sable | Nirmiti Sawant; Renuka Shahane | Kishori Ambiye; Santosh Pawar |
| 4 | Fu Bai Fu | 13 February 2012 | 13 May 2012 | Mon-Tue | Nilesh Sable | Mahesh Kothare; Swapnil Joshi | Satish Tare; Vijay Patwardhan |
| 5 | Fu Bai Fu | 13 August 2012 | 4 November 2012 | Mon-Tue | Nilesh Sable | Ashwini Kalsekar; Jitendra Joshi | Team Kushal Badrike |
| 5 | Fu Bai Fu -Dhoom Dhadaka | 5 November 2012 | 11 December 2012 | Mon-Tue | Nilesh Sable | Ashwini Kalsekar; Jitendra Joshi | Team Kushal Badrike |
| 6 | Fu Bai Fu -Comdeycha Aadharcard | 18 March 2013 | 23 June 2013 | Mon-Tue | Nilesh Sable | Ashwini Kalsekar; Swapnil Joshi | Bhalchandra Kadam; Supriya Pathare |
| 7 | Fu Bai Fu - Toll Free Comedy | 14 October 2013 | 12 January 2014 | Mon-Tue | Nilesh Sable | Ashwini Kalsekar; Swapnil Joshi | Bharat Ganeshpure; Sagar Karande |
| 8 | Fu Bai Fu - Naya Hain Yaha | 21 April 2014 | 9 August 2014 | Mon-Tue | Nilesh Sable | Ashwini Kalsekar; Sanjay Jadhav | Bharat Ganeshpure; Sagar Karande |
| 9 | Fu Bai Fu - Jithe Asal, Tithe Hasal | 3 November 2022 | 17 December 2022 | Thu-Sat | Vaidehi Parshurami | Nirmiti Sawant; Umesh Kamat | —N/a |

== Cast ==
=== Contestants ===
- Anand Ingale
- Anand Abhyankar
- Aditi Sarangdhar
- Bhalchandra Kadam
- Vaibhav Mangle
- Supriya Pathare
- Ashwini Ekbote
- Sudesh Mhashilkar
- Surekha Kudachi
- Ajinkya Joshi
- Aarti Wadabgalkar
- Aarti Solanki
- Bharat Ganeshpure
- Sagar Karande
- Kushal Badrike
- Girish Oak
- Shreya Bugade
- Sharvari Patankar
- Sunil Tawde
- Shashikant Kerkar
- Sankarshan Karhade
- Priyadarshan Jadhav
- Pandharinath Kamble
- Vishakha Subhedar
- Vikas Samudre
- Namrata Sambherao
- Neha Shitole
- Digamber Naik
- Prajakta Hanamghar
- Ajay Jadhav
- Leena Bhagwat
- Madhvi Juvekar
- Kishori Ambiye
- Kishori Godbole
- Satish Tare
- Kshitee Jog
- Santosh Mayekar
- Priya Berde
- Bhargavi Chirmule
- Bhakti Desai
- Santosh Pawar
- Hemangi Kavi
- Atul Todankar
- Snehlata Tawde-Vasaikar
- Atisha Naik
- Mangesh Desai
- Sharmishtha Raut
- Anshuman Vichare
- Onkar Bhojane

=== Judges ===
- Nirmiti Sawant
- Renuka Shahane
- Swapnil Joshi
- Ashwini Kalsekar
- Sanjay Jadhav
- Smita Talwalkar
- Jitendra Joshi
- Mahesh Kothare
- Umesh Kamat

== Awards ==
Zee Marathi Utsav Natyancha Awards
| Year | Category | Recipient |
|---|---|---|
| 2010 | Best Anchor | Nilesh Sable |
| 2010 | Best Reality Show | Essel Vision Productions |
| 2012 | Best Reality Show | Essel Vision Productions |
| 2013 | Best Non-fiction show | Essel Vision Productions |
| 2013 | Best Judge | Swapnil Joshi |

== Summary ==
=== Season 1 ===
==== Host ====
- Nilesh Sable

==== Judges ====
- Nirmiti Sawant
- Swapnil Joshi
- Smita Talwalkar

==== Contestants ====
- Vaibhav Mangle (Winner)
- Vishakha Subhedar (Winner)
- Aarti Solanki
- Anand Abhyankar
- Surekha Kudachi
- Ajinkya Joshi
- Digambar Naik
- Girish Oak
- Sharvari Patankar
- Sunil Tawde
- Vikas Samudre
- Neha Shitole
- Namrata Sambherao
- Satish Tare
- Bhaktee Desai
- Santosh Pawar

=== Season 2 ===
==== Host ====
- Nilesh Sable
- Sai Tamhankar

==== Judges ====
- Nirmiti Sawant
- Swapnil Joshi

==== Contestants ====
- Anshuman Vichare - Atul Todankar (Winner)
- Kishori Ambiye - Anand Ingale
- Sagar Karande - Sunil Tawde
- Vikas Samudre - Aarti Solanki
- Vaibhav Mangle - Kshitee Jog
- Supriya Pathare - Purnima
- Anand Ingale - Digambar Naik

=== Season 3 ===
==== Host ====
- Nilesh Sable

==== Judges ====
- Nirmiti Sawant
- Renuka Shahane

==== Contestants ====
- Kishori Ambiye - Santosh Pawar (Winner)
- Bhau Kadam - Satish Tare
- Kushal Badrike - Hemangi Kavi
- Bhargavi Chirmule - Mangesh Desai
- Santosh Mayekar - Priya Berde
- Atul Todankar - Snehlata Tawde-Vasaikar
- Sunil Tawde - Atisha Naik

==== Special appearance ====
- Vaibhav Mangle - Anand Ingale

=== Season 4 ===
==== Host ====
- Nilesh Sable

==== Judges ====
- Mahesh Kothare
- Swapnil Joshi

==== Contestants ====
- Vijay Patwardhan - Satish Tare (Winner)
- Digambar Naik - Hemangi Kavi
- Anand Abhyankar -
- Kushal Badrike - Purnima
- Amita Khopkar - Jaywant Wadkar
- Anand Ingale - Supriya Pathare

=== Comedycha Aadharcard ===
==== Host ====
- Nilesh Sable

==== Judges ====
- Ashwini Kalsekar
- Swapnil Joshi

==== Contestants ====
- Bhau Kadam (Winner)
- Supriya Pathare (Winner)
- Leena Bhagwat
- Hrishikesh Joshi
- Kushal Badrike
- Santosh Pawar
- Vijay Patwardhan
- Priyadarshan Jadhav
- Kshitee Jog
- Sharmishtha Raut
- Hemangi Kavi
- Rajan Bhise

==== Special appearance ====
- Mohan Joshi

=== Toll Free Comedy ===
==== Host ====
- Nilesh Sable

==== Judges ====
- Ashwini Kalsekar
- Swapnil Joshi

==== Contestants ====
- Bharat Ganeshpure (Winner)
- Sagar Karande (Winner)
- Bhau Kadam
- Supriya Pathare
- Vijay Patwardhan
- Madhavi Juvekar
- Sunil Tawde
- Priyadarshan Jadhav
- Anshuman Vichare
- Atul Todankar
- Hemant Dhome
- Sudesh Mhashilkar
- Avinash Narkar

=== Naya Hain Yaha ===
==== Host ====
- Nilesh Sable

==== Judges ====
- Ashwini Kalsekar
- Sanjay Jadhav

==== Contestants ====
- Bharat Ganeshpure - Sagar Karande (Winner)
- Anand Ingale - Vaibhav Mangle
- Bhau Kadam - Supriya Pathare
- Sudesh Mhashilkar - Surekha Kudachi
- Ajinkya Joshi – Aarti Wadagbalkar
- Sunil Tawade - Shashikant Kerkar
- Sankarshan Karhade - Shreya Bugade
- Priyadarshan Jadhav - Vishakha Subhedar

=== Jithe Asal, Tithe Hasal ===
==== Host ====
- Vaidehi Parshurami

==== Judges ====
- Nirmiti Sawant
- Umesh Kamat

==== Contestants ====
- Onkar Bhojane
- Sagar Karande
- Pandharinath Kamble
- Kamlakar Satpute
- Ashish Pawar
- Madhavi Juvekar
- Neha Khan
- Sneha Majgaonkar
- Pranav Raorane
- Shashikant Kerkar
- Nandkishor Choughule

== Reception ==
| Week | Year | TAM TVR | Rank | | Ref. |
| Week | Year | TAM TVR | Mah/Goa | All India | Ref. |
|---|---|---|---|---|---|
| Week 17 | 2010 | 0.68 | 1 | 90 | |
| Week 20 | 2010 | 0.8 | 1 | 80 | |
| Week 21 | 2010 | 0.76 | 1 | 77 | |
| Week 22 | 2010 | 0.83 | 1 | 66 | |
| Week 24 | 2010 | 0.76 | 2 | 95 | |
| Week 26 | 2010 | 0.86 | 1 | 80 | |
| Week 31 | 2010 | 0.87 | 2 | 72 | |
| Week 32 | 2010 | 0.78 | 1 | 80 | |
| Week 48 | 2010 | 0.7 | 1 | 97 | |
