= Bhindi fry =

Stir fried okra dish

Bhindi Fry
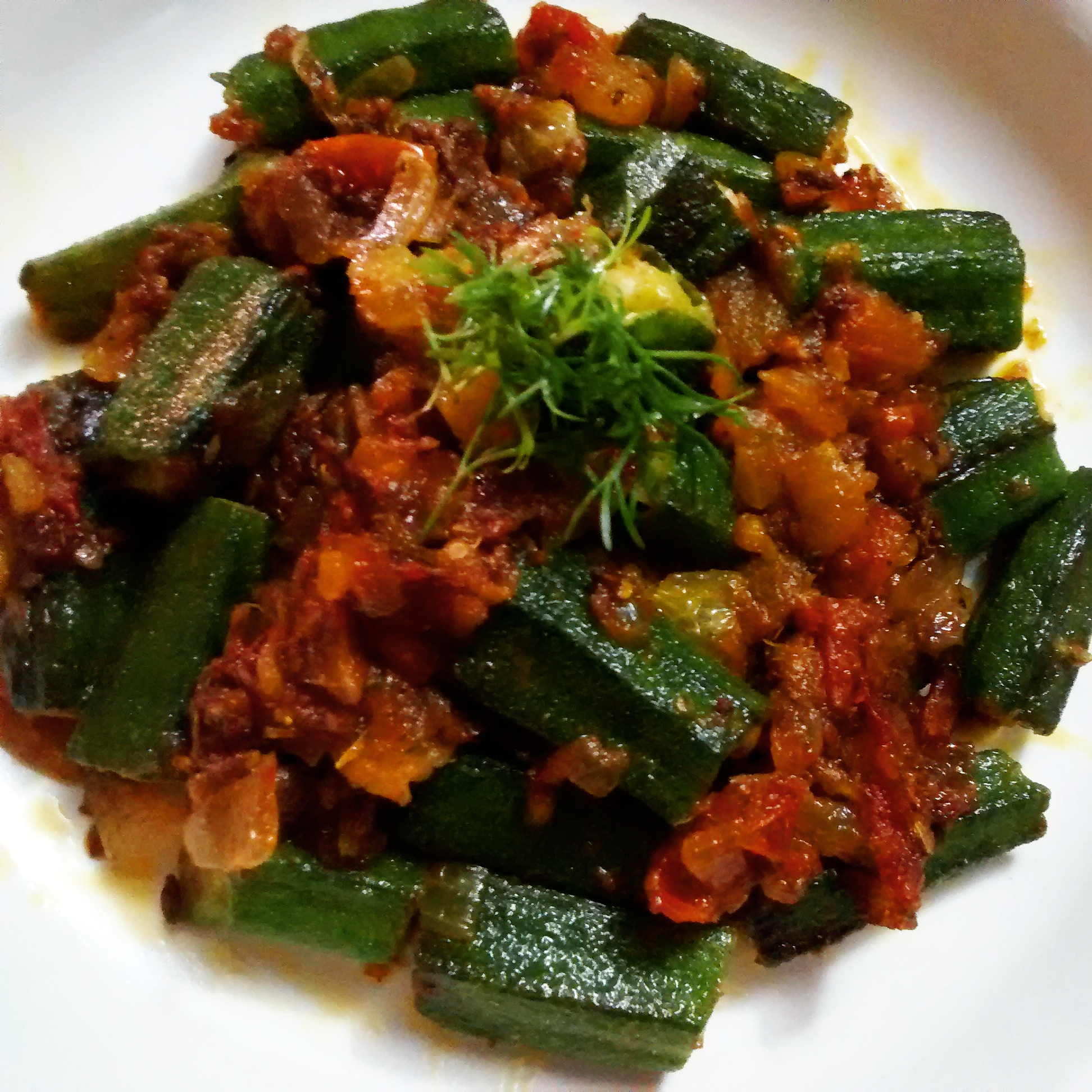
- Bhindi Masala
- Place of origin: India, Nepal, Pakistan, Bangladesh, Trinidad and Tobago
- Region or state: Indian subcontinent and Caribbean
- Main ingredients: Okra, Oil, Spices

Bhindi Fry (also called okra fry, fry ochro, bhendi fry, bhindi masala or bharwan bhindi) is stir-fried okra (ladies' finger) that is slit and stuffed with spice mix such as garam masala and other locally available ground spices.

This dish is stir-fried or sautéed slightly, which is distinct from batter-fried okra, which involves deep frying.

It can be served as a side dish in accompaniment with steamed rice and dal or with chapati as a form of sabzi.

== See also ==
- List of Indian dishes
- List of stuffed dishes
- List of Pakistani dishes
