= Jagannath Dixit =

Indian professor

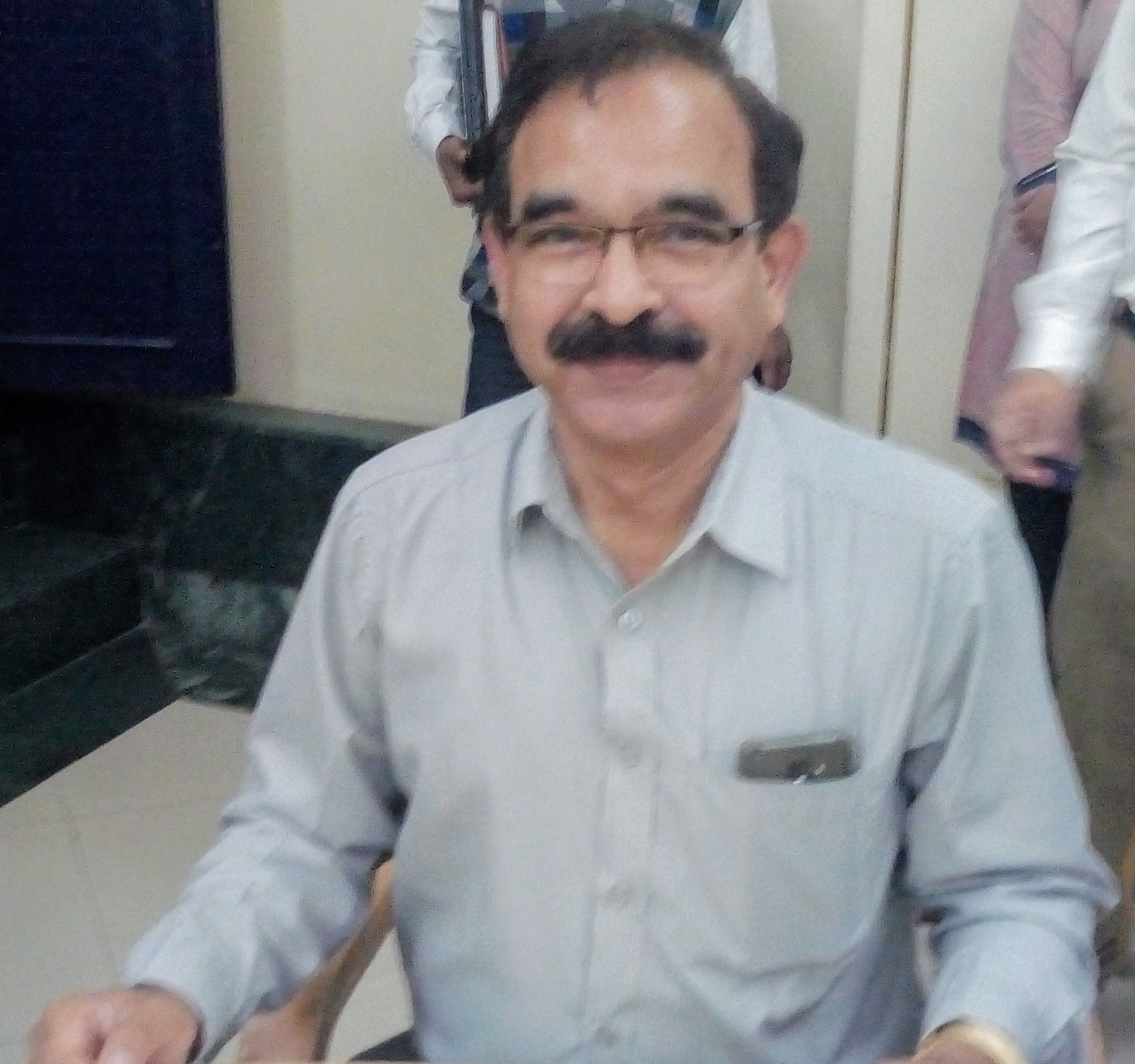
Jagannath Dixit

Jagannath Dixit is an Indian professor who is known for propounding a diet plan to reverse obesity and type 2 diabetes. Physicians, diabetologists, and experts from the Indian Medical Association have said that the diet is not supported by scientific evidence. But new evidence supports some of his views such as lifestyle modification can reduce HbA1c (signifying extent of diabetes) in patients. Dixit is a professor at the B J Medical College, Pune, and he was named the brand ambassador for the Government of Maharashtra's anti-obesity campaign in Maharashtra in 2018.

The Dixit diet plan, where a person eats two meals a day, was originally conceived by Shrikant Jichkar. However, Dixit's claims have been challenged for lacking scientific validation, and he has been accused of providing potentially harmful advice to those with diabetes. The Indian Medical Association has noted that Dixit is neither a dietician nor a diabetologist. A 2018 article at the JAMA Internal Medicine journal concluded that the hypothesis of carbohydrate stimulated insulin secretion being the primary cause of common obesity, was difficult to reconcile with available evidence.
