= Bharat Ganeshpure =

Indian comedian

- Born: 15 August 1969 (age 57); Daryapur, Amravati, Maharashtra
- Occupation: Actor
- Years active: 2001–present
- Style: Comedy
- Spouse: Archana Ganeshpure (m. 2000)
- Children: Dhruv

Bharat Ganeshpure is an Indian actor and comedian. He is best known for his comical performances in the Marathi television shows Fu Bai Fu and Chala Hawa Yeu Dya. Bharat Ganeshpure rose to fame with his performance in Chala Hawa Yeu Dya.

The typical Varhadi dialect, is Bharat's specialty. Bharat has also played supporting roles in several Marathi films, most recently, Chi Va Chi Sau Ka. Bharat also played a pivotal role in Marathi comedy film Jalsa.

== Personal life ==
Ganeshpure married Archana Ganeshpure on 20 February 2000. They have a son named, Dhruv Ganeshpure. He studied BSc Agriculture from Dr. Panjabrao Deshmukh Krishi Vidyapeeth, Akola.

== Filmography ==
=== Television ===
Year	Title	Role	Ref.
2001	Aabhalmaya	Episodic role	
2005	CID	Episodic role	
2005–2007	Vadalvaat	Baban Ghodghate	
2011	Mrs. Tendulkar	Mr. Ramdas Pagare	
2012	Crime Patrol	Vijay Jadhav	
2013-2014	Shejari Shejari Pakke Shejari	Popatrao Landage	
2013-2014	Fu Bai Fu	Contestant	
2014–2025	Chala Hawa Yeu Dya	Various roles	

=== Films ===
Though Bharat has always played more supporting roles in the movies, but his roles in the movies Ek Daav Dhobi Pachhad, Nishani Dava Angatha, and Kapus Kondyachi Goshta were well-praised by the audience. In Kapus Kondyachi Goshta, he performed the role of villain, which is exactly opposite to his image of being a comedian. In the movie Jalsa, he was seen in a pivotal role.

Marathi

Year	Title	Role
2026	Salbardi	
2025	Khalid Ke Shivaji	
2024	Panipuri	
2024	Raja Rani	
2023	Pillu Bachelor	Police Inspector
2023	Ankush	
2022	Jhund	Local MLA
2022	Takatak 2	Chandu's father
2020	Basta	Police Head Constable Chintamani Rokade
2019	Takatak	Chandu's father
2019	Babo	
2018	Odh- Maitritil Avyakt Bhavna	
2018	Hichyasathi Kay Pan	
2018	Dr. Tatya Lahane	
2018	Shikari	
2017	Ek Maratha Lakh Maratha	
2017	TTMM – Tujha Tu Majha Mi	
2017	Khopa	
2017	Chi Va Chi Sau Ka	Marriage registrar
2016	Jalsa	Mama
2016	Barad	land dealer
2017	Ranjan	
2017	Shoor Amhi Sardar	
2016	Rangaa Patangaa	
2016	Kapus Kondyachi Goshta	
2016	Vrundavan	
2015	Shegavicha Yogi Gajanan	
2014	Swami Public Ltd.	
2014	Dr. Prakash Baba Amte – The Real Hero	Police officer
2014	Bhakarkhadi 7 km	
2014	Poshter Boyz	District Health Officer
2013	Sadrakshanay	
2013	Ek Daar Bhangadi Faar	
2013	Gajrachi Pungi	
2012	Langar	
2012	Uchala Re Uchala	
2011	Pratibimb	
2011	Sagala Karun Bhagla	
2011	Fakta Ladh Mhana	
2010	Chal Dhar Pakad	
2010	Debu	
2010	Tata Birla Ani Laila	
2010	Kon Aahe Re Tikade	
2009	Mata Ekvira Navsala Pavli	Subhash
2009	Ek Daav Dhobi Pachhad	Bhagwan
2009	Nishani Dava Angatha	School Teacher
2008	Checkmate	
2008	Sakhkha Savatra	
2006	Aai Shappath..!	Visu Mama
2004	Saatchya Aat Gharat	

Hindi

Year	Title	Role
2001	Tamboo Mein Bamboo	
2004	Black Friday	
2010	Aakrosh	CBI Inspector Rakesh
2012	Bhoot Returns	Police Inspector
2013	Meridian Lines	
2021	Hello Charlie	Doctor
2025	Inspector Zende	Bhalchandra Patil

Hindi Web series

Year	Title	Role
2026	Pritam and Pedro	Sathe (Secretary of Minister)
