= Hemangi Kavi =

Indian television actress and model

- Born: 26 August 1980 (age 45); Mumbai, Maharashtra, India
- Occupation: Actress
- Years active: 2003–present
- Spouse: Sandeep Dhumal (m. 2007)

Hemangi Kavi (born 26 August 1980) is an Indian actress and model who works primarily in Marathi films and marathi as well as hindi television.

== Early life ==
Hemangi Kavi hails from Mumbai and was brought up in Kalwa, Thane. She attended Sahakar Vidya Prasarak Mandal Secondary School in Kalwa, Thane. She then went to the JJ School of Arts and graduated with a Bachelor of Fine Arts. She also completed a diploma in web designing, and started working as a web designer. Considering her interest in acting, she began a career in the theatre.

== Career ==
She debuted in Marathi films with Rangee Berangee (2008) and, the same year, Dhudgus (2008). Since then, she has appeared in numerous films, which include Manatlya Manat (2010), Kon Aahe Re Tikade (2010), Paradh (2010), Davpech (2010), Paach Naar Ek Bejaar (2010), Pangira (2011), Fakt Ladh Mhana (2011), Swarajya (2011), Gola Berij (2012), Pipaani (2012), and Gadad Jambhal (2012).

Her appearances on television include Fu Bai Fu and Mrs. Mukhyamantri, which aired on Zee Marathi, Phulpakharu on Zee Yuva, and the comedy TV series Maddam Sasuani Dhaddam Sun, which was telecasted in Mi Marathi.

== Filmography ==
Year	Title	Role	Notes	Ref
2008	Rangee Berangee	Aarti	Debut	
2008	Dhudgus			
2010	Manatlya Manat	Amol		
2010	Paach Naar Ek Bejar			
2010	Davpech	Shevanta		
2010	Paradh	Indu		
2010	Kon Aahe Re Tikade	Devaki		
2011	Fakt Ladh Mhana			
2011	Pangira			
2012	Pipaani	Nanda	Zee Chitra Gaurav Puraskar for Best Supporting Actress	
2012	Gola Berij	Subak Thengani		
2012	Gadad Jambhal	Bhangi		
2014	Vaadhdivsachya Haardik Shubhechcha	Vinita		
2014	Jai Shankar			
2015	Chuk Bhul Dyavi Ghyavi			
2016	Bhootkaal			
2016	School Chalega...?			
2018	Savita Damodar Paranjpe	Savita Damodar Paranjpe		
2019	Bandishala	Ruksana		
2019	Sarva Line Vyasta Ahet	Priyanka		
2021	Pandu	Sangita Mahadu Mahagade		
2022	Bharat Maza Desh Ahe			
2022	Tamasha Live	Sutradhar		
2022	Varhadi Vajantri			
2023	Ticha Shahar Hona		Maharashtra State Film Award for Best Supporting Actress	
2024	Life Line			

== Television ==
Year	Title	Role	Language	Channel	Ref.
2003-2007	Vadalvaat	Shravani Chaudhari	Marathi	Zee Marathi	
2004-2005	Hasnyavari Gheu Naka		Marathi	DD Sahyadri	
2006-2010	Avaghachi Sansar	Sakshi Sabnis	Marathi	Zee Marathi	
2009	Piya Ka Aangan	Swati	Hindi	DD National	
2010-2014	Fu Bai Fu	Contestant	Marathi	Zee Marathi	
2012	Maddam Sasu Dhaddam Sun	Sneha	Marathi	Mi Marathi	
2014	Crime Patrol	Episodic role	Hindi	SET	
2017-2019	Phulpakharu	Shalmali	Marathi	Zee Yuva	
2019-2020	Mrs. Mukhyamantri	Ragini Shinde	Marathi	Zee Marathi	
2021	Teri Laadli Main	Urmila Kumar	Hindi	Star Bharat	
2022	Lek Majhi Durga	Vaiju Jagtap	Marathi	Colors Marathi	
2022	Guilty Minds	Sundar Maniram's wife	Hindi	Amazon Video	
2023–2024	Kaise Mujhe Tum Mil Gaye	Bhavani	Hindi	Zee TV	
2023-2024	Man Dhaga Dhaga Jodte Nava		Marathi	Star Pravah	
2023	Taali	Sister of Shreegauri Sawant	Hindi	JioCinema	
2024	Madness Machayenge – India Ko Hasayenge		Hindi	Sony Entertainment Television	
2026	Tu Anolakhi Tari Sobati		Marathi	Sun Marathi	

== Awards ==
- Maharashtra State Film Award for Best Supporting Actress For Film Tich shahar hone
- Zee Chitra Gaurav Puraskar for Best Supporting Actress for film Pipani
