= Saksham Kulkarni =

Indian actor

- Born: Mumbai, Maharashtra, India
- Occupation: Actor
- Years active: 2005–present
- Known for: De Dhakka; Pak Pak Pakaak

Saksham Kulkarni is an Indian film and television actor who works in Marathi film industry.

== Filmography ==
- Pak Pak Pakaak (2005)
- Shevri (2006)
- De Dhakka (2008)
- Lonavala Bypass (2009)
- Shikshanachya Aaicha Gho (2010)
- Allah Ke Banday (2010)
- Fakta Ladh Mhana (2011)
- Kaksparsh (2012)
- Life Mein Hungama Hai (2013)
- Amhi Bolato (2014)
- Ghantaa (2016)
- Laden Ala Re Ala (2017)
- Ziprya (2018)
- Bhai: Vyakti Ki Valli (2019)
- De Dhakka 2 (2022)
- Alyad Palyad (2024)
- Mi Pathishi Aahe (2025)
- Banjara (2025)

== Television ==
- Ambat Goad (2012-2014)
- Love Lagna Locha (2016-2018)
- Padded Ki Pushup (2018)
- Paaru (2025)
