= Bhalchandra Kadam =

Indian Marathi actor

Bhau Kadam
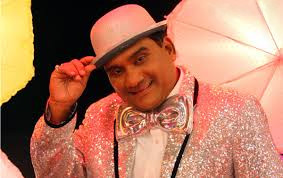
- Born: 3 March 1972 (age 54); Thane, Maharashtra, India
- Other name: Bhau Kadam
- Occupations: Actor; comedian
- Spouse: Mamata Kadam (m. 2000)
- Notable work: Fu Bai Fu; Chala Hawa Yeu Dya; Timepass

Comedy career
- Medium: television, film
- Genres: character comedy; Satire
- Subjects: Bollywood; Marathi cinema; everyday life; Indian culture; popular culture; Marathi television

Bhalchandra Kadam (born 3 March 1972), popularly known as Bhau Kadam, is a Marathi theatre and film actor. He is Famous Awards 2025 winner known as a comedian, particularly when working in commercial Marathi cinema and drama. He began his acting career in 1991, when he started acting in dramas. He is well known for his roles in Fu Bai Fu. He has acted in more than 9 serials and has been involved in more than 500 drama shows.

== Personal life ==
Bhalchandra Kadam was born and brought up in Dombivli since childhood & now resides in Thane. Kadam has a wife named Mamata. They have three daughters and a son.

== Career ==
He is one of the best comedy actors in Marathi. He is well known for his skits in Fu Bai Fu, a Marathi standup comedy TV show on Zee Marathi. He also plays the main role, along with Nilesh Sable, in the comedy show Chala Hawa Yeu Dya, also aired on Zee Marathi. In this serial, he plays the character of Pappa, Jyotishi and many more characters. In almost every character, Bhau has been unique with his brilliant comic timing. His innocence while putting up hilarious comedy has earned him immense popularity among millions of Marathi fans. He also worked in a shows like Tuza Maza Jamena, Mala Sasu Havi and participated in almost every Zee Marathi Utsav Natyancha Awards show by performing his skits. Bhau also appeared as a guest on the Zee Marathi show Kanala Khada hosted by Sanjay Mone.

He was part of many Marathi movies. Timepass 2, Timepass, Sanngto Aika, Miss Match, Pune Via Bihar, Narbachi Wadi, Kokanastha, Chaandi, Mast Challay Aamcha and Balkadu are some of the successful movies in which he played an important role. He was also present in the Hindi movie Ferrari Ki Saawar. He will be appearing as a lead actor in the upcoming Marathi movie VIP Gadhav which is expected to be a hit considering mix of comedy, story with rural background and songs written by poet/lyricist Bashir Momin Kavathekar. He is now part of Hastay Na Hasaylach Pahije Comedy Show on Colors Marathi.

=== Marathi play career ===
Kadam has played a number of roles in Marathi plays in his career. Some of the important plays are Shantecha Karta Chalu Ahe, Yada Kadachit, Charlie, and Karun Gelo Gaon.

=== Awards ===
On 22 June 2025 Bhau Kadam has received Famous Awards 2025 for his outstanding performance by Shri. Nitin Gadkari. Union Minister of Road Transport and Highways. At orange city Nagpur.

== Filmography ==
| Year | Title | Role | Language | Notes | Ref. |
|---|---|---|---|---|---|
| 2005 | Dombivli Fast | Havaldar Jadhav | Marathi | | |
| 2010 | Harishchandrachi Factory | Deaf and dumb actor | Marathi | | |
| 2011 | Fakta Ladh Mhana | Cameo appearance | Marathi | | |
| 2011 | Mast Challay Aamcha | Havaldar (Police) | Marathi | | |
| 2011 | Davpech | | Marathi | | |
| 2012 | Ferrari Ki Sawaari | Shamshu Bhai | Hindi | | |
| 2012 | Kutumb | Bhau | Marathi | | |
| 2012 | Gola Berij | | Marathi | | |
| 2013 | Narbachi Wadi | Dr. D'souza | Marathi | | |
| 2013 | Chaandi | | Marathi | | |
| 2013 | Ek Cutting Chai | | Marathi | | |
| 2013 | Kokanastha-Taath Kana Haach Baana | | Marathi | | |
| 2014 | Miss Match | Bhau | Marathi | | |
| 2014 | Sanngto Aika | Kharade | Marathi | | |
| 2014 | Pune Via Bihar | | Marathi | | |
| 2014 | Aamhi Bolto Marathi | | Marathi | | |
| 2014 | Balkadu | Peon | Marathi | | |
| 2014 | Timepass | Dagadu's father (Appa) | Marathi | | |
| 2015 | Vaajlaach Paahije: Game Ki Shinema | Bhau Kamdar | Marathi | | |
| 2015 | Time Bara Vait | Auto Wala | Marathi | | |
| 2015 | Timepass 2 | Shantaram Parab | Marathi | | |
| 2016 | Jaundya Na Balasaheb | Zatkya | Marathi | | |
| 2016 | Half Ticket | Tutti Frutti | Marathi | | |
| 2016 | Made In Maharashtra | | Marathi | | |
| 2017 | Zindagi Virat | Anna (Sarpanch) | Marathi | | |
| 2017 | Boyz | Baban | Marathi | | |
| 2017 | Zala Bobhata | Dinu | Marathi | | |
| 2017 | Ranjan | | Marathi | | |
| 2018 | Cycle | Gajya | Marathi | | |
| 2018 | Jaga Vegali Antyatra | Nadau Kaka | Marathi | | |
| 2018 | Liftman | Liftman | Marathi | Web series, released on ZEE5 | |
| 2018 | Shikari | Bhau Mama | Marathi | | |
| 2018 | Loose Control | Raskar | Marathi | | |
| 2018 | Yuntum | | Marathi | | |
| 2019 | Wedding Cha Shinema | Madan | Marathi | | |
| 2019 | VIP Gadhav | Gangaram | Marathi | | |
| 2019 | Nashibvaan | Baban | Marathi | | |
| 2021 | Puranpoli | | Marathi | | |
| 2021 | Pandu | Pandu Hawaldar | Marathi | Maharashtra State Film Award for Best Comedian | |
| 2021 | DAV | Aanna | Marathi | | |
| 2021 | Aaltun Paltun | Yashwant | Marathi | | |
| 2022 | Timepass 3 | Shantaram Parab | Marathi | | |
| 2022 | Majhi Aashiqui | Raja Koli | Marathi | | |
| 2022 | Phulpakharu | Kamaliya | Marathi | | |
| 2022 | Benwad | Sanjya | Marathi | | |
| 2023 | Ekda Yeun Tar Bagha | Gulabi Garam Baba | Marathi | | |
| 2023 | Lai Jhakaas | Politician | Marathi | | |
| 2023 | Club 52 | Gambler | Marathi | | |
| 2023 | Manmauji | Shree's Father | Marathi | | |
| 2025 | Inspector Zende | Bhalchandra Patil | Hindi | | |
| 2025 | Premachi Goshta 2 | Baburao | Marathi | | |
| 2025 | Ambat Shaukin | Bhau | Marathi | | |
