= List of Marathi films of 2021 =

This is a list of Marathi (Indian Marathi-language) films that are scheduled to release or released in 2021.

== January - June ==
Opening		Title	Director	Cast	Ref.
J A N	22	Peter	Amol Arvind Bhave	Manisha Bhor, Amol Pansare	
J A N	29	Basta	Tanaji Ghadge	Sayali Sanjeev, Parth Bhalerao	
F E B	12	Oh My Ghost	Wasim Khan	Prathamesh Parab, Kajal Sharma, Pankaj Vishnu	
F E B	12	Ek Ti	Amar Parkhe	Vijay Kadam, Prema Kiran, Rupali Jadhav	
F E B	19	Kaanbhatt	Aparana S Hosing	Bhavya Shinde, Rugved Mule, Sanjeev Tandel, Vipin Borate	
F E B	19	Preetam	Sijo Rocky	Pranav Raorane, Nakshatra Medhekar, Upendra Limaye, Ajit Devle	
F E B	26	Befaam	Krishna Kamble	Siddharth Chandekar, Sakhi Gokhale, Vidhyadhar Joshi	
F E B	27	Pension	Pundalilik Y.L Dhumal	Sonali Kulkarni, Sumit Gutte, Nilambari Khamkar, Narayan Jadhav	
F E B	28	Gast	Amit Koli	Tanaji Galgunde, Monalisa Bagal, Shashank Shende	
M A R	19	Hashtag Prem	Rajesh Jadhav	Mitali Mayekar, Suyash Tilak	
A P R	9	Well Done Baby	Priyanka Tanwar	Pushkar Jog, Amruta Khanvilkar, Vandana Gupte	
A P R	30	The Disciple	Chaitanya Tamhane	Aditya Modak, Arun Dravid	
J U N E	30	June	Vaibhav Khisti Suhrud Godbole	Nehha Pendse Siddharth Menon	

== July - December ==
Opening		Title	Director	Cast	Ref.
N O V	12	Jayanti	Shailesh Narwade	Ruturaj Wankhede, Titeeksha Tawde, Milind Shinde	
N O V	19	Jhimma	Hemant Dhome	Nirmiti Sawant, Siddharth Chandekar, Sonalee Kulkarni	
D E C	3	Godavari	Nikhil Mahajan	Neena Kulkarni, Jitendra Joshi, Vikram Gokhale	
D E C	3	Pandu	Viju Mane	Bhalchandra Kadam & Kushal Badrike	
D E C	9	Bali	Vishal Furia	Swapnil Joshi, Pooja Sawant, Samarth Jadhav	
D E C	10	Darling	Sameer Asha Patil	Prathamesh Parab, Ritika Shrotri and Nikhil Chavan	
D E C	17	Free Hit Danka	Sunil Govind Magare	Somnath Avghade, Apurva Shelgaongkar, Tanaji Galgunde and Arbaz Shaikh	

== See also ==
- List of Marathi films of 2020
