= Aaha Hero =

- Official song cover

Single by Pravin Kuwar

from the album Ghar Banduk Biryani
- Language: Marathi
- Released: 28 February 2023
- Studio: TSM Studios; Studio 504
- Venue: Mumbai, India
- Genre: Soundtrack
- Length: 5:34
- Label: Zee Music Company
- Composer: AV Prafullachandra
- Lyricist: Vaibhav Deshmukh
- Producer: AV Prafullachandra

Ghar Banduk Biryani track listing
- 1. "Gun Gun"; 2. "Aaha Hero"; 3. "Haan Ki Badiv (halgi version)" 4. "Ghar Banduk Biryani"; 5. "Mariya"; 6. "Haan Ki Badiv"

Music video
- Aaha Hero on YouTube

"Aaha Hero" is a 2023 Indian Marathi song from the soundtrack album of Ghar Banduk Biryani, composed by AV Prafullachandra and sung by Pravin Kuwar. The lyrics are penned by Vaibhav Deshmukh. The music video for the track features Sayaji Shinde and Akash Thosar. It was released on 28 February 2023, as the second single from the album after "Gun Gun" through Zee Music Company.

The video song features scenes directly from the film and was choreographed by Ganesh Acharya, with filming taking place at Gaganbawada. The song was arranged by composer AV Prafullachandra, who also handled the mixing. It was recorded in Mumbai by Dhananjay Sathe, Rahul Sharma, and Samir Dharap, and mastered at Newedge Studio by Shadab Rayeen. In addition to the original Marathi version, the song was released in Hindi, Tamil, and Telugu.

== Composition ==
It was composed by AV Prafullachandra; he also handled the arranging and mixing. The song was recorded by Dhananjay Sathe at TSM Studios, Rahul Sharma and Samir Dharap at Studio 504 in Mumbai, and mastered at Newedge Studio, Mumbai, by Shadab Rayeen. Prafullachandra emphasizes that a song within a film is more than just a musical piece; it encapsulates a journey of life, filled with emotions. Working with Nagraj sir previously, he appreciates his meticulous attention to every aspect of the film, including the music. Consequently, all these elements seamlessly align to create a cohesive and impactful cinematic experience.

"At the time of Sairat, when I used to hear the songs, I used to tell myself that Maharashtra is going to love this. Before the song release, we used to carry those songs discreetly like bombs in our cell phones – only mine and Kutub's. We used to lock ourselves in the cars and discreetly listen to the songs. This time around too, we had to follow the same routine. So this is basically the second bomb that we are presenting."

— Nagraj Manjule said at the launch of the song in Pune

Lyrics of the song was written by Vaibhav Deshmukh and sung by Pravin Kuwar.

== Marketing and release ==
The teaser of the music video was released on 22 February 2023, and the full song was released on 28 February 2023.

The song was officially released on 28 February 2023, on digital platforms. The song was launched in Pune in the presence of the entire cast of the film, where the making video of the film was showcased.

The song was also released in Hindi, Tamil, and Telugu with the same title. On 20 March 2023, the Hindi version of "Aaha Hero" was released. It was sung by Pravin Kuwar and written by Jai Atre. The Tamil version was also released on the same day, sung by Mathichiyam Bala, with lyrics penned by Yugabharati. The Telugu version was released on 27 April 2023, sung by Sai Charan and written by Anantha Sriram.

== Credits ==
- AV Prafullachandra – composer, arranger and producer, mix (AV's Music Lab, Mumbai)
  - Vishal Sadaphule – assistant to composer, associate mix engineer
- Pravin Kuwar – singer
- Vaibhav Deshmukh – lyricist
- Ganesh Acharya – choreographer
- Vivek Naik, Rahul Chitnis, Santosh Bote, Mangesh Shirke – vocal
- Sayaji Shinde, Charan Jadhav, Pravin Chavan, Sudhir Kulkarni, Pravin Dalimbkar, Vishal & Sahil – additional Vocalists
- Jeromi Meghlayi, Mesalanga – pots
- Karthik Vamsi – percussions
- Tapas Roy – strokes
- Shadab Rayeen – mastering (Newedge Studio, Mumbai)
- Dhananjay Sathe – recording engineer (TSM Studios)
- Rahul Sharma & Samir Dharap – recording engineers (Studio 504, Mumbai)

== Music video ==
The music video is taken directly from scenes in Ghar Banduk Biryani and was mainly shot by Sayaji Shinde and Akash Thosar. It also features actors Somnath Awghade and Pravin Dalimkar. The choreography was by Ganesh Acharya, and the video was shot at Gaganbawada.

== Reception ==
The song received positive response from audience.

== Track listing ==
Marathi
No.	Title	Lyrics	Singer (s)	Length
1.	"Aaha Hero"	Vaibhav Deshmukh	Pravin Kuwar	5:34

Hindi
No.	Title	Lyrics	Singer (s)	Length
1.	"Aaha Hero"	Jai Atre	Pravin Kuwar	5:33

Tamil
No.	Title	Lyrics	Singer (s)	Length
1.	"Aaha Hero"	Yugabharathi	Mathichiyam Bala	5:21

Telugu
No.	Title	Lyrics	Singer (s)	Length
1.	"Aaha Hero"	Anantha Sriram	Sai Charan	5:33
