= Ghar Banduk Biryani =

- Theatrical release poster
- Directed by: Hemant Jangal Awtade
- Written by: Hemant Jangal Awtade; Nagraj Manjule
- Produced by: Nagraj Manjule; Bhushan Manjule
- Starring: Akash Thosar; Nagraj Manjule; Sayaji Shinde; Sayli Patil
- Cinematography: Vikram Amladi
- Edited by: Kutub Inamdar
- Music by: AV Prafullachandra
- Production companies: Zee Studios; Aatpat Production
- Release date: 7 April 2023
- Running time: 161 minutes
- Country: India
- Language: Marathi
- Budget: est.₹8–10 crore
- Box office: est.₹5 crore

Ghar Banduk Biryani (transl. Home, Gun, Biryani), abbreviated as GBB, is a 2023 Indian Marathi-language action comedy film directed by Hemant Jangal Awtade in his directorial debut, starring Akash Thosar, Sayaji Shinde, Nagraj Manjule, and Sayli Patil in the lead roles. It was jointly produced by Zee Studios and Aatpat Production. The film centres on Pallam, the leader of an who insurgency in the fictional town of Kolagad, where Raju meets Lakshmi. Lakshmi's father insists Raju has a house, but he can't comply. Meanwhile, Inspector Raya Patil's duty in Pune causes issues, leading to his transfer to Kolagad.

Principal photography started in Dussehra in 2021. The majority of the shooting took place in Gaganbawada, along with sporadic scenes filmed in Pune. The score is provided by Vaibhav Deshmukh, and AV Prafullachandra composed the soundtrack album. The film's makers held several events in college and universities throughout Maharashtra to promote the film.

Ghar Banduk Biryani was theatrically released on 7 April 2023. The film received positive reviews from critics and grossed over ₹5 crore (US$520,000) worldwide, became the ninth highest grossing Marathi film of 2023. Despite positive reviews, the film underperformed at the box office. It was released on OTT platform ZEE5 on 2 June 2023, along with Hindi, Tamil, Telugu dubbed versions.

== Plot ==
In the Kolagad region, dacoits led by Commander Pallam terrorise the area with the aim of assassinating the village MLA. However, the situation becomes personal when Pallam's lover, Maria, who is also a dacoit, is fatally shot. Inspector Raya Patil, known for his integrity, is transferred to the region after confronting the sons of a senior minister for harassing women. Raya's wife, Namrata, unhappy with his frequent transfers and unwavering honesty, decides to separate from him. Meanwhile, Raju, a chef at a small dhaba, falls in love with Laxmi, but her father insists that he must own a house within a few months, an impossible task as Raju is an orphan. Pallam's associate, George, suggests a temporary separation due to increased police scrutiny and food shortages, but Pallam, driven by revenge for Maria's death, refuses. Pallam's gang kidnaps Raju from his workplace along with food supplies after recognising that his biryani resembles Maria's cooking. As Raya takes charge of the Kolagad police station, he struggles to balance his personal life, while Raju seeks a gun to pose as a dacoit, hoping to surrender to the police and claim a reward so that he can be with Laxmi. Pallam, consumed by grief over Maria and her culinary skills, wants Raju to join his gang.

== Cast ==
- Akash Thosar as Raju Achari, a Chef
- Sayaji Shinde as Pallam, the leader of Naxalite
- Nagraj Manjule as Police Inspector Raya Patil
- Deepti Devi as Namrata, Raya Patil's wife
- Sayli Patil as Lakshmi
- Shwetambari Ghute as Mariya
- Vitthal Nagnath Kale as George
- Tanaji Galgunde as Vishnu
- Somnath Awghade as Soma
- Pravin Dalimbkar as Gura
- Priyanshu Chetri as Babu Gavas
- Subhash Kambale as Kaka Kero
- Niraj Jamgade as Michael
- Santosh Vhadgir
- Suraj Pawar
- Arbaz Shaikh
- Lalit Matale
- Kiran Pralhad Thoke
- Kishore Nilewad
- Girish Krishnat Koravi
- Charan Jadhav
- Ashish Khachane
- Ashok Kangude
- Kishor Kadam as MLA's PA

== Production ==
=== Development ===
Before the onset of the COVID-19 lockdown in India, Manjule possessed the script for the film, originally titled solely as "Biryani". At that juncture, Manjule harbored reservations about the narrative's efficacy. However, encouraged by Awtade, the storyline underwent a significant overhaul, culminating in the finalized title, "Ghar Banduk Biryani". Zee Studios made an official announcement regarding the film on Dussehra 2021, accompanied by a teaser release.

=== Casting ===
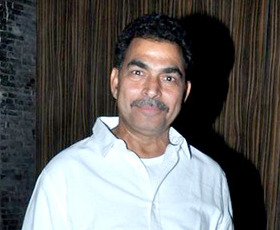
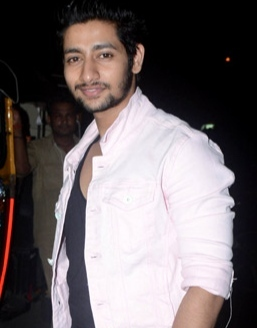
Sayaji Shinde (left) played the character of naxal commander and Akash Thosar (right) secured the central role of chef.

Akash Thosar and Sayli Patil, who previously starred together in Jhund, take on the lead roles in the film. Nagraj Manjule and Sayaji Shinde also join in pivotal roles. Initially, Manjule intended to portray the Naxalite commander, a role eventually taken on by Sayaji Shinde. Supporting roles feature Tanaji Galgunde, Deepti Devi, Shwetambari Ghute, Vitthal Kale, and Arbaz Shaikh. The poster released in March 2023 introduces Somnath Awghade and Suraj Pawar, both of whom previously appeared in Fandry alongside Manjule. Several of Nagaraj Manjule's colleagues from the police force portray cops in the film.

=== Filming ===
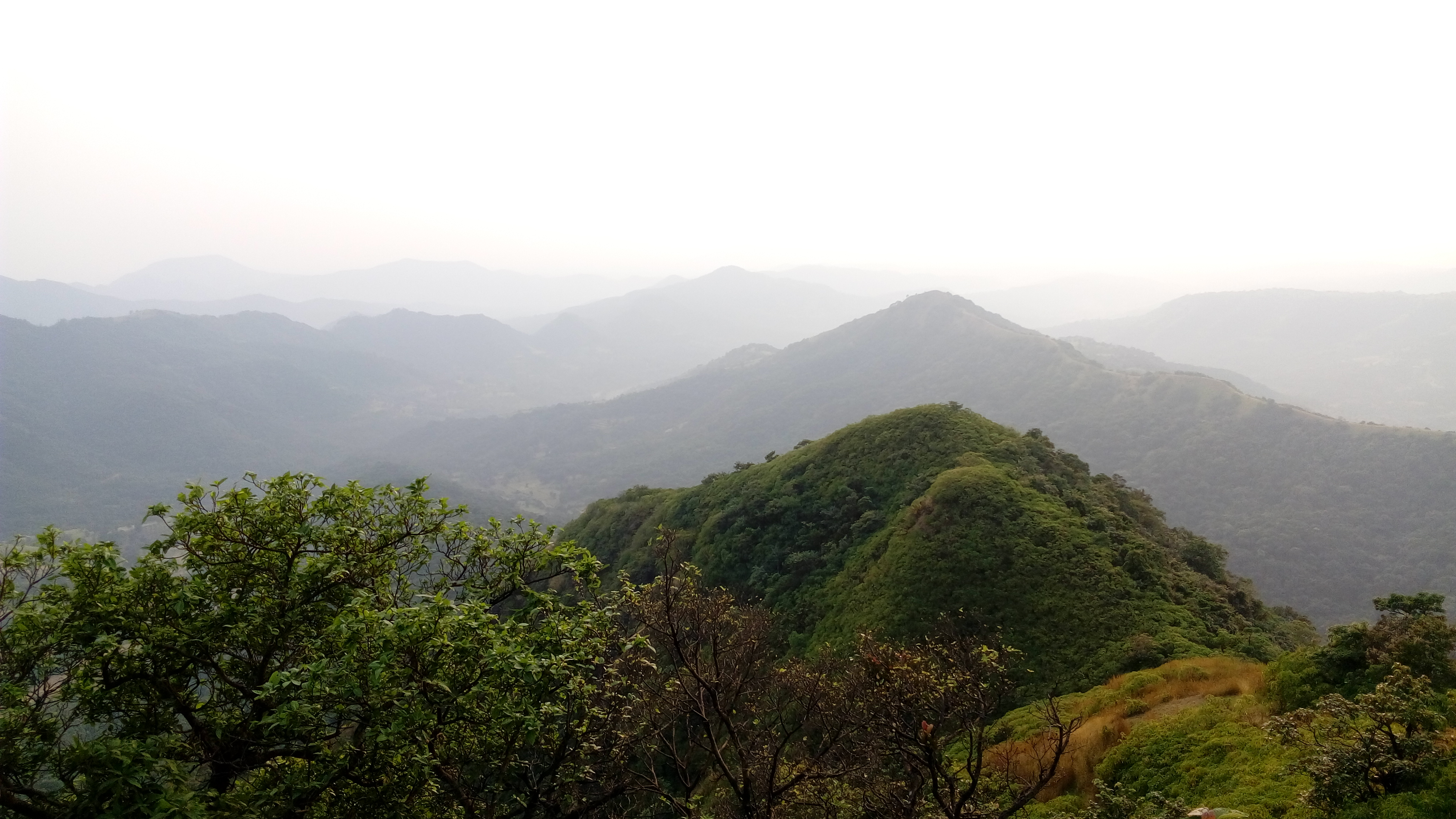
The film was majorly shot at Gaganbawada

A major part of the film takes place in the forest, so the location was very important. The makers visited the forests of Khopoli, Bhor, Nagpur, Madhya Pradesh etc. Gaganbawada in Sahyadri mountain ranges of Kolhapur district was decided for filming. 80 percent of the film was shot at Gaganbawada.

=== Post-production ===
Post-production was wrapped up in December 2022.

== Marketing ==
Sand Art by Jayesh Borse; In the painting, Sayaji Shinde (left), Nagraj Manjule (centre), Akash Thosar (right).

The first teaser of Ghar Banduk Biryani was released on YouTube on 15 October 2021 by Aatpat Production, followed by the second teaser on 25 October 2022 by Zee Studios. The film’s official trailer was unveiled on 15 March 2023.

Promotional activities for the film began on 14 March 2023, with a statewide tour across Maharashtra, covering cities such as Baramati, Islampur, Kolhapur, Jalna, Mumbai, Nagpur, Nashik, Chandrapur, Chhatrapati Sambhajinagar, Pune, Navi Mumbai, Solapur, Pandharpur, and Mangalwedha. (Note: Multiple references) The campaign concluded in Mumbai with a visit to the Siddhivinayak Temple.

== Release ==
=== Theatrical ===
Ghar Banduk Biryani was theatrically released on 7 April 2023 in Marathi, along with dubbed versions in Hindi, Tamil and Telugu. Initially scheduled for 30 March 2023, the film's release was postponed to avoid clashing with Bholaa. Manjule announced the new release date as 7 April 2023, on 11 February 2023.

=== Home media ===
The digital streaming rights of the film are acquired by ZEE5 and was premiered on 2 June 2023.

== Reception ==
=== Critical reception ===
Yugandhar Tajne of Sakal gave the film 4 stars out of 5 stars, praising director Hamant Jangal Awtade for his skillful storytelling, effective dialogue delivery, strong performances, musical score, composition, and cinematography. Mihir Bhanage of The Times of India rated it 3.5 stars, describing it as a perfect big-screen entertainer and noting the refreshing presence of a Marathi film in the action drama genre.

Madhura Nerurkar of Maharashtra Times gave 3 out of 5 rating and write "This artwork excels in storytelling, action sequences, and background music, yet certain scenes linger unnecessarily. The actors deliver commendable performances, alongside impressive cinematography and captivating background music, enhancing the overall narrative flow." Shrikrishna Iyer of Koimoi gave 3 rating praised performances of Sayaji Shinde and Nagraj Manjule while criticised old cliché action scenes, said "Despite a few oversights in the story, debutante director Hemant Awtade made an entertaining film to watch. If you like dark humour and action films, Ghar Banduk Biryani is a good watch." Shaheen Irani of OTT Play rated 3/5 and wrote "Even if loud, the film is entertaining for most parts. The music is rare and does not disturb your viewing experience."

Scroll.in writes "Ghar Banduk Biryani, featuring a lovable rebel commander, an expert biryani cook and a principled police officer, may be the world's first song-and-dance Maoist comedy film. Debutant director Hemant Jangal Awtade anticipates almost black humour, elaborately choreographed action scenes and minor subplots." Akhilesh Neralekar of Loksatta gives a positive review and writes "Ghar Banduk Biryani will certainly be considered as a different experiment for the exciting setting of a simple story, but in terms of business, we sincerely feel that Nagaraj Manjule should not be subjected to a Jhund-like situation again." Pratikshya Mishra of The Quint wrote "Ghar Banduk Biryani portrays the good and bad of an otherwise gray world." Rutuja Deshmukh from Film Companion wrote "Ghar Banduk Biryani is a rare commercial Marathi film to delve into the Maoist issue and engage with the humane side of a political turmoil that is complicated by oppressive tactics on part of the government and administration, as well as caste atrocities."

=== Box office ===
The film collected ₹62 lakh (US$64,000) on its opening day and weekend collection is ₹2.23 crore (US$230,000). The film earned ₹2.25 crore in five days. The film grossed over ₹5 crore (US$520,000) in its final theatrical run.

== Music ==
Ghar Banduk Biryani

Soundtrack album by AV Prafullachandra
- Released: April 10, 2023
- Venues: Mumbai, India
- Studios: Recording: TSM Studios; Studio 504; Mix: AV's Music Lab; Master: NewEdge Studio
- Genre: Feature film soundtrack
- Length: 35:37
- Language: Marathi
- Label: Zee Music Company

AV Prafullachandra chronology
Godavari (2021)	Ghar Banduk Biryani (2023)	Naal 2

Official audio
- Ghar Banduk Biryani - Full Album on YouTube

AV Prafullachandra has given music and background score for this film. The song "Gun Gun" was released first, all versions of this song crossed 4 million plus views on YouTube. The second featured song "Aaha Hero" is choreographed by Ganesh Acharya. The "Title track" is sung by Bollywood singer Mohit Chauhan and written by Vaibhav Deshmukh. The final released song was "Haan Ki Badiv" sung by AV Prafullachandra, Manish Rajgire and Sahil Kulkarni, entirely filmed on Nagraj Manjule.

=== Track listing ===
Marathi
No.	Title	Lyrics	Singer (s)	Length
1.	"Gun Gun"	Vaibhav Deshmukh	Ashish Kulkarni, Kavita Raam	7:24
2.	"Aaha Hero"	Vaibhav Deshmukh	Pravin Kuwar	5:34
3.	"Haan Ki Badiv (halgi version)"	Vaibhav Deshmukh	AV Prafullachandra, Manish Rajgire	5:55
4.	"Ghar Banduk Biryani"	Vaibhav Deshmukh	Mohit Chauhan	6:01
5.	"Mariya"	AV Prafullachandra	AV Prafullachandra	4:21
6.	"Haan Ki Badiv"	Vaibhav Deshmukh	AV Prafullachandra, Manish Rajgire	5:48
Total length:				35:37

Hindi
No.	Title	Lyrics	Singer (s)	Length
1.	"Gun Gun"	Jai Atre	Anurag Kulkarni, Deepali Sathe	7:24
2.	"Aaha Hero"	Jai Atre	Pravin Kuwar	5:33
3.	"Maar Dhanaadan"	Jai Atre	Nakash Aziz, AV Prafullachandra	5:48

Tamil
No.	Title	Lyrics	Singer (s)	Length
1.	"Usurula Usurula"	Yugabharathi	Anurag Kulkarni, Aditi Bhavaraju	7:22
2.	"Aaha Hero"	Yugabharathi	Mathichiyam Bala	5:21
3.	"Vararay Vararay"	Yugabharathi	Tippu	5:50

Telugu
No.	Title	Lyrics	Singer (s)	Length
1.	"Gun Gun"	Chandrabose	Anurag Kulkarni, Aditi Bhavaraju	7:22
2.	"Aaha Hero"	Ananta Sriram	Sai Charan	5:33
3.	"Ichchipadey"	Ananta Sriram	Nakash Aziz	5:50
