= Somnath Awghade =

Indian actor

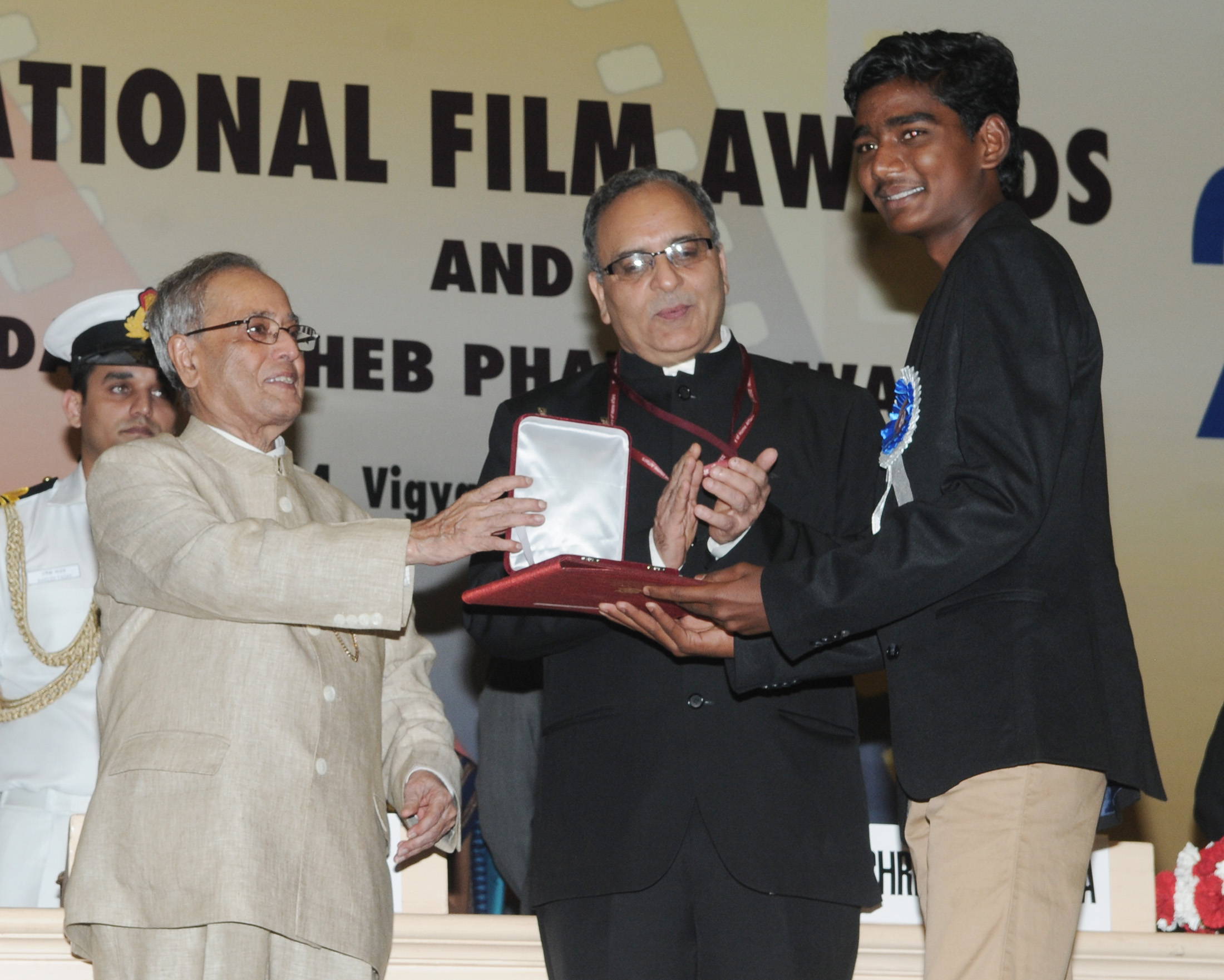
- Awghade (right) at the 61st National Film Awards function, in New Delhi
- Born: Somnath Laxman Awghade; Kem, Solapur district, Maharashtra, India
- Occupation: Actor
- Years active: 2013–present
- Known for: Fandry (2013)
- Awards: See below

Somnath Awghade is an Indian actor known for his role in the 2013 Marathi film Fandry, for which he earned the National Film Award for Best Child Artist. He also appeared in Free Hit Danka (2021), Jhund (2022) and Ghar Banduk Biryani (2023).

== Early life ==
Somnath Awghade is from Kem village, Karmala Taluka, Solapur district, Maharashtra. He belongs to a family of Halgi performers, and has an elder brother named Ravi and a sister named Ambika. Awghade received his education in a public school in Kem.

== Career ==
Awghade began his career with Fandry as the lead character Jambuwant (nicknamed Jabya) and became famous for his performance in the film. The director of Fandry, Nagraj Manjule received the National Award in 2011 for his short film Pistulya. During the felicitation ceremony in Kem village, he noticed Somnath Awghade playing the halgi. This encounter led to Manjule offering the lead role in Fandry to Awghade. Awghade was initially afraid to act and would hide under his village's water tank, but Manjule and his team eventually convinced Awghade to accept the role.

After Fandry, Awghade starred in Free Hit Danka in 2021 co-starring Arbaz Shaikh and Tanaji Galgunde. The following year, Awghade made his Bollywood debut in Jhund with Amitabh Bachchan, marking his second collaboration with Manjule. In 2023, Manjule again cast him in the Hemant Awtade's Ghar Banduk Biryani. In 2024, he starred in Sangharsh Yoddha Manoj Jarange Patil, which is based on the real-life story of Maratha activist Manoj Jarange Patil.

== Filmography ==
Year	Film	Role	Notes	Ref(s)
2013	Fandry	Jambuwant "Jabya" Kachru Mane	Debut	
2021	Free Hit Danka	Santosh		
2022	Jhund	Imran	Hindi film	
2023	Ghar Banduk Biryani	Soma		
2024	Sangharsh Yoddha Manoj Jarange Patil	Kisna		

== Awards ==
Year	Award	Category	Nominated work	Result	Ref(s)
2013	61st National Film Awards	Best Child Artist	Fandry	Won	
2013	Pune International Film Festival	Best Actor	Fandry	Won	
