= Rishi Saxena =

Indian actor

- Born: 3 March 1990 (age 36); Jaipur, Rajasthan, India
- Occupation: Actor
- Years active: 2016–present
- Known for: Kahe Diya Pardes
- Partner: Isha Keskar (2018–present)

Rishi Saxena (born 3 March 1990), is an Indian actor who primarily works in Marathi and Hindi television and films. He is best known for his lead role in Zee Marathi's Kahe Diya Pardes as Shivkumar Shukla.

== Personal life ==
Rishi Saxena and Isha Keskar are currently in a live-in relationship. Their relationship was first hinted at when Rishi posted a picture with Isha on his Instagram story in 2018. The couple initially met on the set of Chala Hawa Yeu Dya, where Isha was impressed by Rishi's calm demeanor during their first meet. Later, they began conversing at the Zee Marathi Utsav Natyancha Awards, with Isha taking the initiative to approach Rishi.

== Career ==
Saxena started his career in 2016 with Zee Marathi's Kahe Diya Pardes as Shivkumar Shukla. He also starred in Colors Marathi's Ghadge & Suun. He mostly appeared in Digpal Lanjekar's movie such as Fatteshikast, Pawankhind, Sher Shivraj, Subhedar.

In 2023, he appeared in Colors TV's Saavi Ki Savaari as Manav Jain. From 2023 to 2024, he has been playing ACP Bajirao Rane in StarPlus's Ghum Hai Kisikey Pyaar Meiin.

== Filmography ==
=== Films ===
Year	Title	Role	Notes
2017	PFA: Love Mom & Dad	Son	Short film
2018	Yours Truly Roohani	Rishi Chauhan	Short film
2018	Aakhri Baar Hi Sahi	Shiva	Short film
2019	Fatteshikast	Fatteh Khan	
2021	Gud Boy	Pranav Kulkarni	
2021	The Right One	Dishant	Short film
2022	Pawankhind	Rustam Zaman	
2022	Sher Shivraj	Fazal Khan	
2023	Subhedar	Kubad Khan	
2024	Hi Anokhi Gaath	Rohit	
2024	Malhar	Laxman	
2026	Ranapati Shivray: Swari Agra	Ramsingh	
2026	Aali Mothi Shahani		

=== Television ===
Year	Title	Role	Language	Notes
2016–2017	Kahe Diya Pardes	Shivkumar Shukla (Shiv)	Marathi	Debut & lead role
2017	Prem He	Rishi	Marathi	Episodic role
2018	Ghadge & Suun	Rishi	Marathi	Cameo appearance
2019	#Movingout	Reva's boyfriend	Marathi	
2023	Saavi Ki Savaari	Manav Jain	Hindi	
2023–2024	Ghum Hai Kisikey Pyaar Meiin	ACP Bajirao Rane	Hindi	
2024	Aai Kuthe Kay Karte!	Mihir Sharma	Marathi	
2025–2026	Itti Si Khushi	Inspector Sanjay Bhosale	Hindi	
2026-present	Krushnaichya Leki	Shiv	Marathi	

=== Music video ===
Year	Title	Co-actor	Notes	Ref.
2018	Ishkkachi Nauka	Pranjal Palkar	Debut	
2020	Lajira	Sayali Sanjeev	Lead	
