= Sayali Sanjeev =

Indian film and TV actress (born 1993)

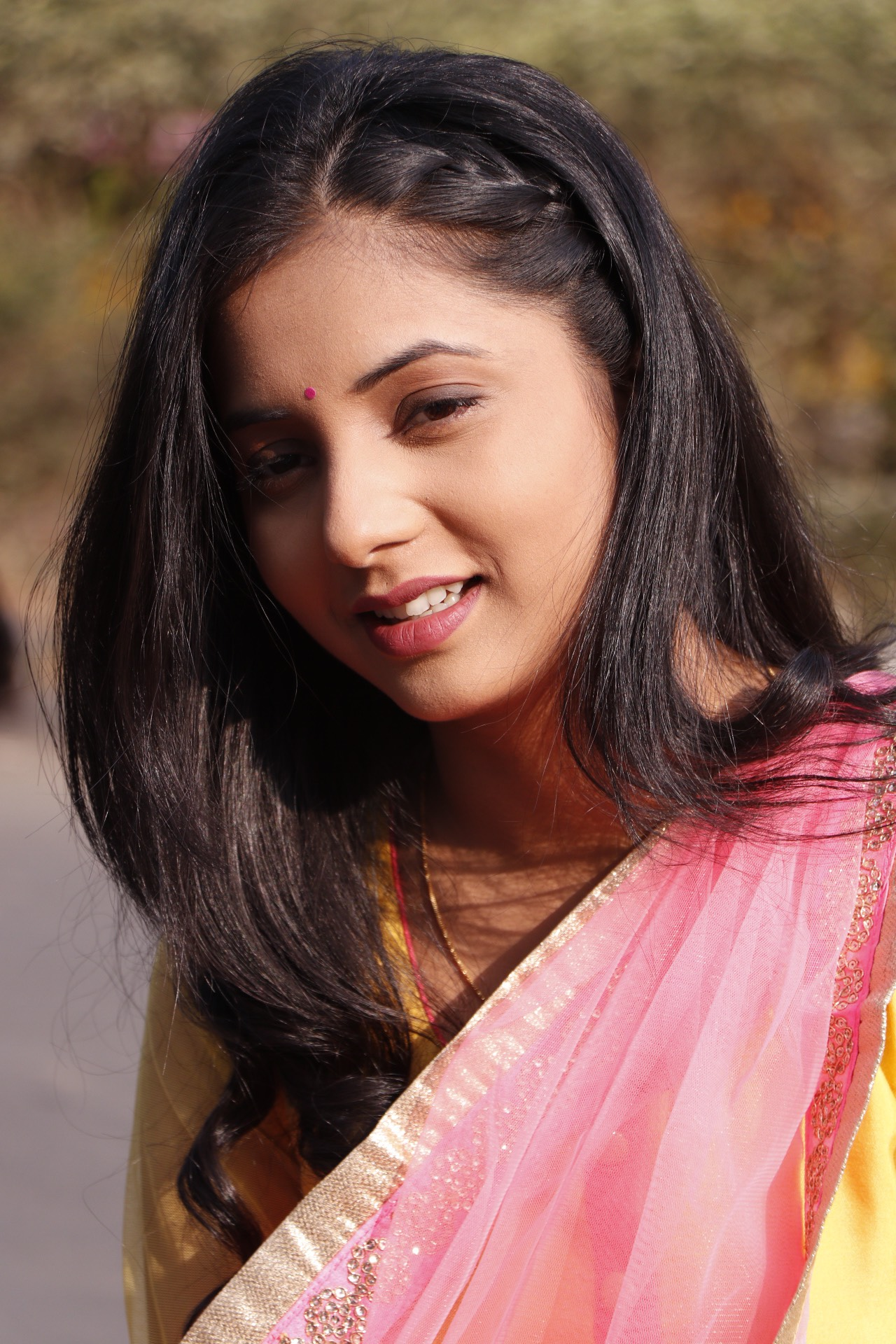
- Born: Sayali Chandsarkar; 31 January 1993 (age 33); Dhule, Maharashtra, India
- Occupation: Actress
- Years active: 2016 - present
- Notable work: Kahe Diya Pardes

Sayali Sanjeev (born 31 January 1993) is an Indian film and television actress from Mumbai who works in Marathi films and television serials. She has received awards including a Filmfare Award for Best Actress in Marathi. She made her debut in the Marathi film Police Line and over the years she has appeared in numerous Successful films including Aatpadi Nights (2019), Basta (2020), Jhimma (2021), Goshta Eka Paithanichi (2022), Har Har Mahadev (2022), Jhimma 2 (2023) and Ole Aale (2024).

== Career ==
Sayali Sanjeev began her career on the television soap opera Kahe Diya Pardes on Zee Marathi and her film career with Police Line, both in 2016. She landed her breakout role in 2019 in Aatpadi Nights for which she earned her first nomination for Best Actress at the 5th Filmfare Awards Marathi. In 2019, she made her OTT debut with 'Rajshri Marathi's 5 episode webseries, U Turn.

In 2021 she starred in the Tanaji Ghadge-directed, Basta, for which she earned her second consecutive nomination of Best Actress at the 6th Filmfare Awards Marathi. She made her television comeback with Shubhmangal Online in 2021 as well. The year ended on a high note with the critically acclaimed and box office successful film Jhimma which was second highest grossing Marathi film of 2021.

In 2022 she started in Shantanu Rode's National Award winning Goshta Eka Paithanichi where she plays a simple woman and the film tells of her struggle that gets more complex at every step. For her performance in the film, she won the Filmfare Award for Best Actress at the 7th Filmfare Awards Marathi and earned a nomination for the Maharashtra State Film Award for Best Actress. Her other release of the year was Har Har Mahadev an epic historical action drama film proved to be a major commercial success earning more than ₹25 crore (US$2.6 million) at the box office and become her highest grossing film. also it became the third highest-grossing Marathi film of 2022.

2023 started with a four year-delayed release, Satarcha Salman, and subsequently she appeared in Urmi. She collaborated with Hemant Dhome for a third time in Jhimma 2 which earned critical praise and was successful at the box office. Following the success of Jhimma 2 she starred across from Siddharth Chandekar in the critically and commercially successful Ole Aale in 2024.

== Other works ==
Maharashtra Navnirman Sena (MNS) appointed her as a deputy president of their film labour wing.

== Filmography ==
=== Television ===
Year	Serial	Role	Channel	Notes
2016 - 2017	Kahe Diya Pardes	Gauri Madhusudan Sawant / Gauri Shivkumar Shukla	Zee Marathi	
2018 - 2019	Perfect Pati	Vidhita Rathore	& TV	
2020 - 2021	Shubhmangal Online	Sharvari Gawaskar	Colors Marathi	

==== Special appearances ====
Year	Title	Role	Channel
2017	Chala Hawa Yeu Dya	Guest as Gauri	Zee Marathi
2018	Chhatriwali	Guest appearance	Star Pravah
2022	Kitchen Kallakar	Guest appearance	Zee Marathi
2022	Bus Bai Bas	Guest appearance	Zee Marathi
2022	Bigg Boss Marathi 4	To promote Goshta Eka Paithanichi	Colors Marathi
2022	Chala Hawa Yeu Dya	To promote Goshta Eka Paithanichi	Zee Marathi

==== Web series ====
Year	Name	Role	Platform	Notes
2019	U Turn	Mukta	YouTube	

=== Films ===
Year	Title	Role	Notes	Ref
2016	Police Line	Divya Deshmukh	Debutant	
2019	Aatpadi Nights	Haripriya	Zee Chitra Gaurav Puraskar for Best Actress	
2020	AB Aani CD	Gargi		
2020	Mann Fakira	Riya		
2020	Daah - Ek Marmsparshi Katha	Disha		
2021	Basta	Swati Pawar		
2021	Jhimma	Krutika Joshi		
2022	Goshta Eka Paithanichi	Indrayani	National Film Award for Best Feature Film in Marathi	
2022	Har Har Mahadev	Sai Bhonsale		
2023	Satarcha Salman	Madhuri Mane		
2023	Phulrani	Pretty Princess Host	Guest appearance	
2023	Urmi	Manasi		
2023	Jhimma 2	Krutika Joshi		
2023	Pillu Bachelor	Swati		
2024	Ole Aale	Kayra Hirve		
2024	PaniPuri	Nima		
2024	Manmauji	Ms. Superstar		
2025	Samsara	Vidhi		
2025	Nibaar	Sangita Deshmukh		
2025	Taath Kana	Vidya		
2025	Kairee	Kairee		
TBA	Yervada Return	TBA		

=== Music video ===
Year	Title	Co-actor	Notes	Ref.
2020	Lajira	Rishi Saxena	Debut	

== Awards and nominations ==
Year	Awards	Category	Work	Role	Result
2016	Zee Marathi Utsav Natyancha Awards 2016	Best Actress	Kahe Diya Pardes	Gauri Sawant	Won
2016	Zee Marathi Utsav Natyancha Awards 2016	Popular Face of the Year	Kahe Diya Pardes	Gauri Sawant	Won
2016	Zee Marathi Utsav Natyancha Awards 2016	Best Couple	Kahe Diya Pardes	Gauri Sawant	Won
2016	Zee Marathi Utsav Natyancha Awards 2016	Best Daughter-in-law	Kahe Diya Pardes	Gauri Sawant	Won
2020	Zee Chitra Gaurav Puraskar	Best Actress	Aatpadi Nights	Haripriya	Won
2020	Zee Chitra Gaurav Puraskar	Natural Performance of the Year	Aatpadi Nights	Haripriya	Nominated
2020	5th Filmfare Awards Marathi	Best Actress	Aatpadi Nights	Haripriya	Nominated
2020	Colors Marathi Awards	Best Actress	Shubhmangal Online	Sharvari Gawaskar	Nominated
2020	Colors Marathi Awards	Best Daughter-in-law	Shubhmangal Online	Sharvari Gawaskar	Won
2021	6th Filmfare Awards Marathi	Best Actress	Basta	Swati	Nominated
2022	7th Filmfare Awards Marathi	Best Actress	Goshta Eka Paithanichi	Indrayani	Won
2022	7th Filmfare Awards Marathi	Best Actress Critics	Goshta Eka Paithanichi	Indrayani	Nominated
2023	Maharashtra Times Sanmaan	Best Actress	Goshta Eka Paithanichi	Indrayani	Won
2023	Zee Chitra Gaurav Puraskar	Best Actress	Goshta Eka Paithanichi	Indrayani	Nominated
2024	TV9 Aapla Bioscope Awards	Best Actress in a Leading Role	Goshta Eka Paithanichi	Indrayani	Won
2024	Zee Chitra Gaurav Puraskar	Most Natural Performance of the Year	Jhimma 2	Krutika Joshi	Won
2024	Maharashtra State Film Awards	Best Actress	Goshta Eka Paithanichi	Indrayani	Nominated
2023	Fakt Marathi Cine Sanman	Fakt Marathi Cine Sanman for Best Actress in a Lead Role	Goshta Eka Paithanichi	Indrayani	Nominated
2023	Sakal Premier Awards	Best Actress	Goshta Eka Paithanichi	Indrayani	Won
