= Vijay Barse =

Indian social worker (born 1946)

- Born: 2 May 1948 (age 78); Bhandara, India
- Occupations: Social worker, Sports Teacher
- Known for: Slum Soccer

Vijay Barse (born 5 February 1946) is a social worker from Nagpur. He is known for having founded Slum Soccer (Krida Vikas Sanstha), an organisation which uplifts underprivileged children through football. His efforts have led to upliftment of underprivileged children from Nagpur using football as a source.

== Career ==
Barse worked as a sports teacher in Hislop College, Nagpur. In 2001, he founded the Slum Soccer organisation after spotting a couple of underprivileged children playing with a makeshift football, inspiring him to start a soccer club. He established the Krida Vikas Sanstha Nagpur (KSVN) with his wife, Ranjana Barse, and son, Abhijeet Barse.

Vijay Barse's story was also unveiled in Season 3's 1st episode of TV show Satyamev Jayate which was hosted by Aamir Khan.

== In popular culture ==
Barse's as well as Slum Soccer's life has been depicted in the 2022 sports film, Jhund, written and directed by Nagraj Manjule, in which, Barse was portrayed by Amitabh Bachchan.
