= Kahe Diya Pardes =

Indian television series

- Genre: Drama; Soap opera
- Written by: Jitendra Gupta
- Screenplay by: Archana Joshi
- Directed by: Ajay Mayekar
- Starring: See below
- Opening theme: "Kahe Diya Pardes" by Mandar Pilvalkar and Madhura Datar
- Country of origin: India
- Original languages: Marathi; Hindi
- No. of episodes: 478

Production
- Producers: Jitendra Gupta; Mahesh Tagde
- Camera setup: Multi-camera
- Running time: 22 minutes
- Production company: Tell-A-Tale Media

Original release
- Network: Zee Marathi
- Release: 28 March 2016 – 23 September 2017

Kahe Diya Pardes (transl. Why gave me abroad?) is an Indian bilingual Marathi and Hindi television series which aired on Zee Marathi. It premiered on 28 March 2016, replacing Ka Re Durava. It starred Rishi Saxena and Sayali Sanjeev in lead roles.

== Plot ==
Shiv Shukla, a kind-hearted North Indian, comes to Mumbai after his promotion. He becomes neighbor to Gauri, a sweet Maharashtrian girl. He falls in love with her, but does not confess. Gauri's father is attached to Marathi language. He later befriends Shiv due to his kind gestures. Later, Gauri also falls in love with Shiv and they confess their feelings to each other, but don't disclose it to anyone else due to cultural differences. Shiv's parents come to Mumbai to look after him. Shiv's father learns about his relationship with Gauri and accepts it but his mother is against it. Shiv and Gauri disclose their relationship to their families. Due to cultural differences, their families try to separate them, but they win against all odds. Shiv, Gauri, and her family go to Varanasi to seek permission from Shiv's grandmother, who accepts Gauri for her kind nature. Later, Shiv and Gauri finally tie the knot and go to Varanasi after marriage. Gauri faces difficulty adjusting to old-fashioned customs. Due to her inability to get used to North Indian culture, Shiv's grandmother asks her to get comfortable in her Marathi outfit and culture. This irks Shiv's mother and she creates hurdles for Gauri. Gauri gets hurt by her actions and returns to Mumbai. Later, Shiv comes to Mumbai to get her back to Varanasi. Later, Gauri gets pregnant with Shiv's children. She learns about her twin babies and decides to give one to her sister-in-law as she cannot conceive. Soon, Gauri gives birth to twins and her in-laws accept her.

== Cast ==
=== Main ===
- Rishi Saxena as Shivkumar Mataprasad Shukla (Shiv)
- Sayali Sanjeev as Gauri Madhusudan Sawant / Gauri Shivkumar Shukla

=== Recurring ===
Shiv's family

- Shahnawaz Pradhan as Mataprasad Shukla; Shiv's father
- Madhuri Sanjeev as Narmada Mataprasad Shukla; Shiv's mother
- Archana Damohe as Shiv's paternal grandmother
- Akhil Pratap Gautam as Ramkumar Mataprasad Shukla (Ram); Shiv's brother
- Teyana Ashnita as Sarla Ramkumar Shukla; Ram's wife
- Bhavya Mishra as Urmila Mataprasad Shukla; Shiv's sister

Gauri's family

- Mohan Joshi as Madhusudan Sawant; Gauri's father
- Shubhangi Gokhale as Sarita Madhusudan Sawant; Gauri's mother
- Shubhangi Joshi as Gauri's maternal grandmother
- Sachin Deshpande as Nachiket Madhusudan Sawant; Gauri's brother
- Neelam Sawant as Nisha Nachiket Sawant; Nachiket's wife

Others

- Mrunal Chemburkar as Nisha's mother
- Sameer Khandekar as Venugopal Kamath (Venu); Shiv's friend
- Nikhil Raut as Vivek (Vicky); Gauri's fiancé
- Karishma Shekhar as Mitali (Mitu); Gauri's friend
- Leena Palekar as Mangesh's mother

== Soundtrack ==
The songs were composed by Samir Saptiskar and lyrics written by Abhijit Gaikwad.

No.	Title	Lyrics	Singer(s)	Length
1.	"Kahe Diya Pardes"	Abhijit Gaikwad	Madhura Datar	01:01
2.	"Chane Laga Madhoshi Ka Sama"	Abhijit Gaikwad	Mandar Pivalkar	06:05
Total length:				07:06

== Reception ==
=== Special episodes ===
1 hour

- 17 July 2016
- 8 October 2016

2 hours

- 9 October 2016 (Shiv-Gauri's Marriage)

=== Ratings ===
Week	Year	BARC Viewership		Ref.
Week	Year	TRP	Rank	Ref.
Week 31	2016	2.1	3	
Week 34	2016	2.4	3	
Week 35	2016	2.4	2	
Week 38	2016	2.8	1	
Week 42	2016	2.6	4	
Week 47	2016	3.0	2	
Week 12	2017	3.3	3	
Week 15	2017	2.9	3	
Week 17	2017	2.3	4	
Week 23	2017	2.1	4	
Week 27	2017	2.6	4	
Week 37	2017	2.3	5	

== Awards ==
Zee Marathi Utsav Natyancha Awards 2016
Category	Recipient	Role
Best Series	Mahesh Tagde	Director
Best Family		Sawant Family
Best Actor	Rishi Saxena	Shiv
Best Actress	Sayali Sanjeev	Gauri
Best Daughter-in-law	Sayali Sanjeev	Gauri
Best Siblings	Sayali Sanjeev-Sachin Deshpande	Gauri-Nachiket
Best Couple	Rishi Saxena-Sayali Sanjeev	Shiv-Gauri
Best Father	Mohan Joshi	Madhusudan
Best Father-in-law	Mohan Joshi	Madhusudan
Best Mother-in-law	Shubhangi Joshi	Aaji
