= Kunku Tikali Ani Tatoo =

Marathi-language TV drama series

- Genre: Family drama
- Starring: See below
- Voices of: Sunidhi Chauhan
- Country of origin: India
- Original language: Marathi
- No. of episodes: 166

Production
- Camera setup: Multi-camera
- Running time: 22 minutes
- Production company: Uphoria Productions

Original release
- Network: Colors Marathi
- Release: 2 April – 8 October 2018

Kunku Tikali Ani Tatoo (transl. Kumkum Bindi and Tatoo) is an Indian Marathi language television series which aired on Colors Marathi. The show starred Adish Vaidya, Shweta Pendse and Sarika Nilatkar in lead roles. The series premiered from 2 April 2018 and ended on 8 October 2019.

== Plot ==
Vibhatai Kulkarni believes the happiness of her home, her husband and her children is the primary responsibility of a woman. But her traditional home is about to get shaken up by the outspoken Rama Prabhudesai. When a young basketball player, who doesn't even believe in the concept of marriage, becomes a part of the Kulkarni clan.

== Cast ==
- Adish Vaidya as Rajwardhan (Raj) Vishnupant Kulkarni
- Shubhangi Joshi as Jiji
- Sarika Nilatkar-Nawathe as Vibha Vishnupant Kulkarni
- Gururaj Avadhani as Vishnupant Kulkarni
- Bhagyashree Nhalve as Rama Rajwardhan Kulkarni
- Prashant Choudappa as Mahadev Kulkarni
- Rajashri Nikam as Subhadra Mahadev Kulkarni
- Shweta Pendse as Kamini Kulkarni
- Rajesh Deshpande as Kedar Kulkarni
- Amol Bawdekar
