= Gagangad =

Fort in Maharashtra, India

Coordinates: 16.5432°N 73.8185°E

Gagangad is a fort situated in Gaganbawada tehsil of Kolhapur district in Maharashtra, India. It was built in 1190.

This fort is situated 55 km west of Kolhapur city. There is below Fort Mahadev temple and Gagangiri Maharaj math. This fort is situated at very thick rain forest of Maharashtra's Western Ghats. You can reach the fort by your vehicle and then you can walk for about one hour for reach the top of the fort.
