= Shubhangi Joshi =

Indian actress (1946–2018)

- Born: 4 June 1946; Bombay, Bombay State, India
- Died: 5 September 2018 (aged 72); Mumbai, Maharashtra, India
- Occupation: Actress,
- Years active: 1999–2018 (her death)

Shubhangi Joshi (4 June 1946 – 5 September 2018) was an Indian theatre and television actress.

== Career ==
Joshi started her acting career on Marathi stage. She received wider recognition with roles in television serials.

== Television ==
Joshi also had a fairly successful career as a television actor in both Hindi and Marathi languages. She played roles in many television series.

=== Television series ===
- Aabhalmaya
- Kahe Diya Pardes
- Kunku Tikali Ani Tatoo
- Tumcha Aamcha Same Asta
- Vadalvaat
- Swapnanchya Palikadle

== Personal life ==
Shubhangi Joshi is survived by her husband Manohar Joshi, son Sameera and daughter-in-law Sarita Joshi, daughter Medha Sane and her grandchildren.

=== Death ===
Shubhangi Joshi died on 5 September 2018 in Mumbai due to age and health issues.
