= Sangharsh Yoddha Manoj Jarange Patil =

- Theatrical release poster
- Directed by: Shivaji Doltade
- Screenplay by: Sudhir Nikam
- Story by: Govardhan Doltade
- Produced by: Govardhan Doltade
- Starring: Rohan Patil; Mohan Joshi; Sandeep Pathak; Gayathri Jadhav; Suresh Vishwakarma; Shubhangi Latkar; Sagar Karande; Shrinivas Pokale
- Cinematography: Krishna Naikar
- Production company: Sonai Films Creation
- Release date: 14 June 2024 (Maharashtra)
- Country: India
- Language: Marathi
- Budget: ₹4 crore
- Box office: ₹62 lakh (US$65,000)

Sangharsh Yoddha Manoj Jarange Patil (transl. The Struggle Warrior Manoj Jarange Patil) is a 2024 Indian Marathi-language biographical film on the life of Manoj Jarange Patil, a prominent activist for Maratha quota rights. The film is directed by Shivaji Doltade and produced by Govardhan Doltade under Sonai Films Creation, the film features Rohan Patil in the titular role. The cast includes Gayathri Jadhav, Mohan Joshi, Sandeep Pathak, Suresh Vishwakarma, Sagar Karande, Shubhangi Latkar, Shrinivas Pokale.

The filming took place in Jarange's village Antarwali Sarathi, Jalna and Mumbai. The film was theatrically released on 14 June 2024 throughout Maharashtra. The film is underperforming at the box office grossed over ₹62 lakh (US$65,000) in eleven days.

On 18 June 2024, during a press conference at Chhatrapati Sambhajinagar, the film's team declared that the entire profit from the film would be allocated to the Maratha community.

== Plot ==
Manoj Jarange Patil, who has continuously engaged in a number of Maratha social fields, is the main character of the film. It is believed that the film centres on his life's battle with the pressing problem of reservation.

== Cast ==
- Rohan Patil as Manoj Jarange Patil
- Mohan Joshi as Raosaheb Jarange
- Gayathri Jadhav
- Suresh Vishwakarma
- Shubhangi Latkar
- Sandeep Pathak as Janya
- Sagar Karande as Sagar
- Arbaz Shaikh as news reporter
- Shrinivas Pokale as Jarange's son
- Shivaji Doltade as Adovocate Gunratna Sadavarte
- Sanjay Kulkarni as Chhagan Bhujbal
- Surabhi Hande as Jarange's wife
- Madhavi Juvekar
- Vijay Mishra
- Vineet Bonde
- Sunil Godbole
- Madhav Abhyankar
- Somnath Awghade as Kisna
- Kishor Choughule
- Siddeshwar Zadbuke
- Jaywant Wadkar

== Production ==
=== Development ===
Discussions began in 2023 among the producers, actors, and the entire team during the release of Khalaga. Following that, within two or three days, the makers resolved to create a biopic detailing the life of Manoj Jarange Patil. The team subsequently met Jarange Patil, informed them about the film, and obtained permission.

=== Casting ===
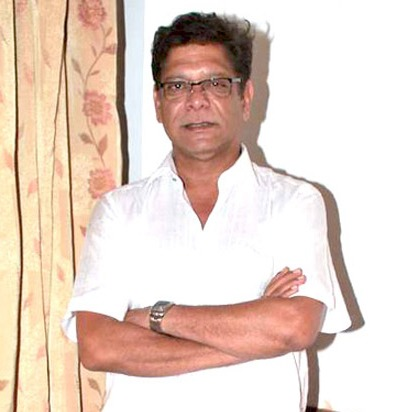
Mohan Joshi is playing the role of Jarange's father.

Doltade chose actors based on their linguistic flair, crucial for engaging with Marathwada audiences. Rohan Patil was selected for the key role of Manoj Jarange Patil, supported by Sandeep Pathak, Sagar Karande, Arbaz Shaikh, and Shrinivas Pokale. Mohan Joshi portrays Jarange Patil's father. Doltade mentioned that during casting, Joshi was unwell and had difficulty communicating. Despite this, after hearing the story, Joshi was captivated and agreed to work on the project."

=== Filming ===
The principal photography was begun on 19 January 2024 in Antarwali Sarathi. The film was majorly filmed in Jalna district of Maharashtra. The film shooting was also done in Mumbai. The filming was completed in February 2024 at Antarwali Sarathi.

== Release ==
Originally scheduled for release on 26 April 2024, the film received approval from the Censor Board without any objections to its scenes. However, due to Election Commission guidelines, it couldn't be screened during the Lok Sabha election period due to concerns about the electoral code of conduct and ongoing voting processes. The movie is now slated for release in theaters on 21 June 2024, but it was ultimately moved up to 14 June 2024.

== Box office ==
The movie earned more than ₹8 lakh on its opening day, ₹9 lakh on the second day, and ₹16 lakh over the first weekend. Overall, it grossed more than ₹42 lakh in four days at the box office. The film earned ₹53 lakh in the first week. Next day film takes a big dip and earns only ₹3 lakhs, seventh and eighth day collection is ₹2 lakhs. The film earned 62 lakh in 11 days.

== Soundtrack ==
Track listing
No.	Title	Lyrics	Music	Singer(s)	Length
1.	"Udhalin Jeev"	Vaibhav Deshmukh	Vijay Narayan Gavande	Ajay Gogavale	4:14
2.	"Mard Mavala Shivrayancha Wagh"	Mangesh Kangane	Chinar–Mahesh	Divya Kumar	4:29
3.	"Jai Dev Jai Dev Jai Shivraya"	Mangesh Kangane	Chinar–Mahesh	Adarsh Shinde	3:52
