= Kairee =

Indian Marathi-language romantic thriller film

- Theatrical release poster
- Directed by: Shantanu Ganesh Rode
- Written by: Swara Mokashi
- Produced by: Naveen Chandra; Nandita Karnad; Swati Khopkar; Ninad Battin
- Starring: Sayali Sanjeev; Subodh Bhave; Siddharth Jadhav; Shashank Ketkar; Arun Nalawade; Sulbha Arya
- Cinematography: Pradeep Khanvilkar
- Edited by: Manish Shirke
- Music by: Nishaad Golambare
- Production companies: 91 Film Studios; AVK Pictures
- Release date: 12 December 2025
- Country: India
- Language: Marathi

Kairee is a 2025 Indian Marathi-language romantic thriller film directed by Shantanu Ganesh Rode and written by Swara Mokashi. The film stars Sayali Sanjeev, Subodh Bhave, Siddharth Jadhav, Shashank Ketkar, Arun Nalawade and Sulbha Arya in prominent roles. It is scheduled for theatrical release on 12 December 2025.

== Plot ==
The story follows relationships, emotional journeys, and turning points in the lives of its central characters, set against scenic backdrops and dramatic moments typical of the romantic thriller genre.

== Cast ==
- Sayali Sanjeev as Kairee
- Subodh Bhave as inspector Kamalakar
- Siddharth Jadhav as Gopal
- Shashank Ketkar as Akash
- Arun Nalawade
- Sulbha Arya

== Production ==
Kairee was produced by Naveen Chandra, Nandita Karnad, Swati Khopkar and Ninad Battin under the banners of 91 Film Studios and AVK Pictures. Principal photography took place in various locations across Maharashtra, particularly in the Konkan region. Additional portions of the film were shot in London. The production was wrapped up in May 2023 in London.

== Music ==
Music for the film was composed by Nishaad Golambare and Pankaj Padghan, with lyrics written by Manohar Golambare and Manik Ganesh. The background score was composed by Sai–Piyush.

== Release ==
Kairee premiered in Indian theatres on 12 December 2025. As part of the pre-release promotions, Bollywood actor Suniel Shetty shared the poster on social media. Trailers were released on 30 November 2025.

== Reception ==
Devendra Jadhav of Lokmat reviewed the movie praising its scenic portrayal of the Konkan region and the performances of Sayali Sanjeev and Shashank Ketkar.

Kimaya Narayan of Sakal gave 3 stars out of 5 stars and praised the film's presentation and melodious music but felt the second half slows down.
