= Naad (film) =

Indian romantic action film

Naad The Hard Love
- Theatrical release poster
- Directed by: Prakash Pawar
- Screenplay by: Vinayak Pawar
- Story by: Santosh Dabholkar; Deepak Pawar
- Produced by: Sanjay Pagare; Rupesh Dinkar
- Starring: Kiran Gaikwad; Sapna Mane; Yashraj Dimble; Vijay Patkar
- Cinematography: Amit Singh
- Music by: Pankaj Padghan
- Production companies: Shakuntala Creation Production; Jijau Creation Maker
- Release date: 15 November 2024
- Country: India
- Language: Marathi

Naad The Hard Love is a 2024 Indian Marathi-language film romantic action film directed by Prakash Pawar and produced by Shakuntala Creation Production and Jijau Creation Maker. The film starring Kiran Gaikwad in the leading role, and debutants Yashraj Dimble, Sapna Mane, and Vijay Patkar in key roles.

Principal photography was commenced in January 2024.

The film was theatrically released on 15 November 2024.

== Cast ==
- Kiran Gaikwad as Uday
- Yashraj Dimble as Ajinkya.
- Sapna Mane as Shubhra
- Vijay Patkar
- Jaywant Wadkar
- Tanaji Galgunde
- Kiran Mane
- Kamlesh Sawant
- Tisha Sanjay Pagare
- Suraj Pawar
- Vinayak Pawar
- Srikanth Gaikwad
- Ganesh Padmale
- Ashish Warang
- Ishwar Satling Boramani

== Production ==
The costumes were designed by Nigar Shaikh, while choreography is handled by Siddesh Dalvi. Ramesh Shetty served as the casting director. Kiran Gaikwad stars as the lead, with debutant Sapna Mane opposite him. Filming began in Bhor in January 2024.

== Marketing ==
The first look poster revealed on 10 April 2024, coinciding Gudi Padwa. A music launch event took place on 5 September, with Prasad Oak as the chief guest. The teaser revealed on 26 September, followed by the trailer on 11 October 2024.

== Release ==
The film was originally set to be released on 11 October 2024, then rescheduled to 25 October 2024, and ultimately released in theatres on 15 November 2024.
