= Akolner =

Village in Maharashtra

- Village
- Location in Maharashtra, India Akolner (India)
- Coordinates: 18°59′N 74°40′E
- Country: India
- State: Maharashtra
- District: Ahmednagar
- Time zone: UTC+5:30 (IST)

Akolner is a village near Ahmednager in Maharashtra, India. Akolner is 16 km from its District Main City Ahmednagar. It is 105 km away from Pune and 250 km from the state capital, Mumbai.

The National award-winning Marathi film Fandry, released on 14 February 2014, was shot in Akolner. In its pre-independence era, Akolner was governed by Dabholkars after 1920s.

== Economy ==
Oil depots belonging to Indian Oil and Bharat Petroleum are situated in the village, which is accessible by railway and by road. It is also famous for milk production, peacocks found in farms & floriculture.

== Notable people ==
Akolner is the birthplace of Das Ganu, a follower of Sai Baba of Shirdi.
