= Man Jhala Bajind =

2021 Indian Marathi language TV series

- Genre: Drama; Romance
- Directed by: Aniket Sane
- Starring: See below
- Country of origin: India
- Original language: Marathi
- No. of episodes: 261

Production
- Producer: Tejpal Wagh
- Camera setup: Multi-Camera
- Running time: 22 minutes
- Production company: Waghoba Production

Original release
- Network: Zee Marathi
- Release: 23 August 2021 – 11 June 2022

Man Jhala Bajind (transl. My Mind Went Crazy) is an Indian Marathi language Romance Drama television series which aired on Zee Marathi. It is directed by Aniket Sane and produced by Tejpal Wagh under the banner of Waghoba Production. It starred Shweta Kharat and Vaibhav Chavan in lead roles. It premiered from 23 August 2021 by replacing Karbhari Laybhari.

== Plot ==
A highly educated Krushna accidentally marries Raya, who hails from a less educated family. They dislike each other, but not for long.

== Cast ==
=== Main ===
- Vaibhav Chavan as Rayban (Raya) Bhausaheb Vidhate
- Shweta Kharat as Krishna Govind Phule / Krishna Rayban Vidhate

=== Recurring ===
Raya's family

- Riyaz Mulani as Hritik
- Kalyani Chaudhari as Guli Mavshi
- Sanika Kashikar as Antara Pradeep Borate
- Vaishali Raje-Ghatge as Ranjana Bhausaheb Vidhate
- Rajesh Aher as Bhausaheb Vidhate
- Vikas Hande as Dadasaheb Vidhate
- Kalpana Sarang as Phui Aaji

Others

- Arbaz Shaikh as Papya
- Tanaji Galgunde / Gajanan Kambale as Manoj (Munjya)
- Beena Kalekar as Asha Sopan Raut
- Bharat Shinde as Sopan Raut
- Yogesh Deshpande as Vishwajeet Dharmadhikari
- Surendra Sathe as Pradeep Borate
- Suvarna Chothe as Sarika Pradeep Borate
- Bhakti Zanzane as Munjya's mother
- Ankita Narvanekar as Gauri
- Sachin Hagvane-Patil as Madan
- Dhananjay Jamdar as office worker
- Nilima Kamane as Minty's mother
- Rajbhushan Sahastrabuddhe as Astrologer

== Reception ==
=== Special episodes ===
==== 2 hours ====
- 17 October 2021 (Raya-Krishna's marriage)

==== 1 hour ====
- 21 November 2021
- 19 December 2021
- 2 January 2022
- 20 February 2022
- 6 March 2022
- 10 April 2022
