= Rajeshwari Kharat =

Indian actress

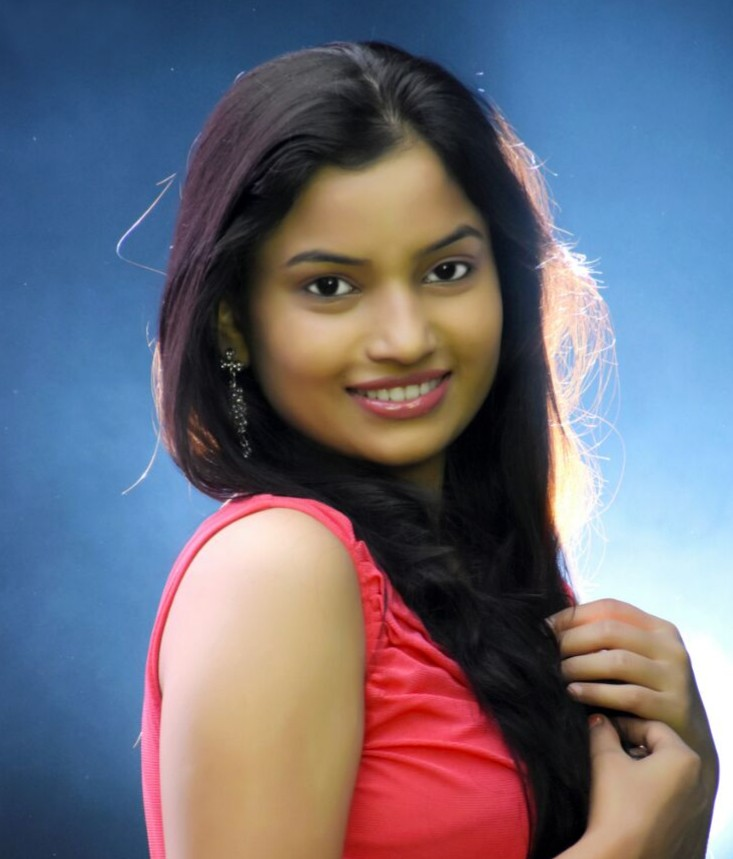

Rajeshwari Kharat is Marathi actress and social media personality best known for her roles in the films Fandry (2013), Pune to Goa, and Itemgiri (2017). She is from the city of Pune in Maharashtra, India.

== Early life ==
Rajeshwari was born on 8 April 1998 in Christian family. She was baptized on Easter Sunday 20 April 2025.

== Career ==
Rajeshwari made her debut as the lead upper-caste love interest named in Fandry (2016). Her roles since Fandry have included Pune to Goa and Itemgiri (2017). She has also starred in music videos, including the 2020 hit Marathi song Mann Unad.
