= Musandi (film) =

- Theatrical release poster
- Directed by: Shivaji Doltade
- Written by: Govardhan Doltade
- Produced by: Govardhan Doltade; Kartik Doltade
- Starring: Rohan Patil; Gayatri Jadhav; Suresh Wishwakarma
- Cinematography: M B Allikatti
- Music by: Sachin Awaghade
- Production company: Sonai Films Creation
- Release date: 9 June 2023
- Country: India
- Language: Marathi

Musandi is a 2023 Marathi-language romantic drama film was released on June 9, 2023. The film is directed by Shivaji Doltade and produced by Govardhan Doltade. The story is written by Govardhan Doltade who also penned the lyrics for the film. The film sheds light on the issues faced by MPSC-UPSC aspirants and candidates, and follows the story of a selfless youth who helps talented individuals achieve their dreams.

== Plot ==
The film revolves around selfless youth who wants to ensure that talented individuals meet their destinies. The film sheds light on the issues faced by MPSC-UPSC aspirants and candidates, and how the system sometimes fails to recognize their potential.

== Cast ==
- Rohan Patil
- Gayathri Jadhav
- Suresh Vishwakarma
- Shubhangi Latkar
- Tanaji Galgunde
- Pranav Raorane
- Arbaz Shaikh
- Shivaji Doltade

== Production ==
After the success of the film Majnu, the same team immediately announced the next outing. The poster of the film was released by Eknath Shinde, who is the Chief Minister of Maharashtra. The film is directed by Shhivaji Doltade, who previously helmed the Marathi film Majnu. The film is produced by Govardhan Doltade, who is also credited as the writer and lyricist for the film. The film's music is composed by Sachin Awghade.
