= Police Line =

2016 Marathi-language film

- Directed by: Raju Parsekar
- Produced by: Rupali Dipak Pawar; Vaishali Nitin Pawar
- Starring: Santosh Juvekar; Sayali Sanjeev; Jayant Savarkar; Satish Pulekar; Pradeep Patwardhan
- Cinematography: Nilesh Dhamale
- Edited by: Satish Patil
- Music by: Pravin Kunwar; Abhishek Shinde
- Release date: 5 February 2016
- Country: India
- Language: Marathi

Police Line is an Indian Marathi language film directed by Raju Parsekar and produced by Rupali Dipak Pawar and Vaishali Nitin Pawar. The film stars Santosh Juvekar, Sayali Sanjeev, Jayant Savarkar, Satish Pulekar, Pradeep Patwardhan and Nisha Parulekar. Music by Pravin Kunwar and Abhishek Shinde. The film was released on 5 February 2016.

== Synopsis ==
Police officer Karad is posted to a new area, where he is visited by a gang of goons who bully him. When his senior appears there, the thugs run away and Karad is reprimanded by him.

== Cast ==
- Santosh Juvekar as Bala
- Sayali Sanjeev as Divya Deshmukh
- Jayant Savarkar
- Satish Pulekar
- Pradeep Patwardhan
- Nisha Parulekar
- Pramod Pawar
- Vijay Kadam
- Jaywant Wadkar
- Manasi Naik

== Soundtrack ==
Police Line

Soundtrack album by Pravin Kunwar Abhishek Shinde
- Released: 2016
- Recorded: 2016
- Genre: Feature film soundtrack
- Length: 8:34
- Language: Marathi

Official audio
- Police Line – Full Album on YouTube

Track listing
No.	Title	Singer(s)	Length
1.	"Akhha Cinema Pahun Ghe"	Bharati Madhavi, Pravin Kunwar	3:51
2.	"Theme Song"	Adarsh Shinde	4:43
Total length:			8:34

== Critical response ==
Police Line film received mixed reviews from critics. Ganesh Matkari of Pune Mirror wrote "Police Line would have worked far better if it had been conceived more as film and less as a petition for the betterment of the police force". Soumitra Pote of Maharashtra Times wrote "Overall, the intention of presenting the life of the police has been achieved in this movie. But if these shortcomings were removed, this movie would have been more successful". A Reviewer of Lokmat wrote "This is a positive film about the police; But if its setting was more powerful, this film would have been more memorable".
