= Jhund (film) =

2022 Indian film by Nagraj Manjule

- Theatrical release poster
- Directed by: Nagraj Manjule
- Written by: Nagraj Manjule
- Produced by: Bhushan Kumar; Krishan Kumar; Sandip Singh; Raaj Hiremath; Savita Raj Hiremath; Nagraj Manjule; Gargee Kulkarni; Meenu Arora
- Starring: Amitabh Bachchan; Ankush Gedam; Akash Thosar; Rinku Rajguru
- Cinematography: Sudhakar Reddy Yakkanti
- Edited by: Kutub Inamdar; Vaibhav Dabhade
- Music by: Songs: Ajay–Atul; Score: Saket Kanetkar
- Production companies: T-Series; Tandav Films Entertainment Pvt.Ltd; Aatpaat Films; Cloud 9 Pictures
- Distributed by: Zee Studios
- Release date: 4 March 2022
- Running time: 176 minutes
- Country: India
- Language: Hindi
- Budget: ₹22 crore
- Box office: est. ₹15.16 crore

Jhund (transl. Herd, unorganised group) is a 2022 Indian Hindi-language biographical sports film based on the life of Vijay Barse, the founder of NGO Slum Soccer. It is produced by Bhushan Kumar, Krishan Kumar, Sandip Singh, Raaj Hiremath, Savita Hiremath, Nagraj Manjule, Gargee Kulkarni and Meenu Arora under the banner of T-Series, Tandav Films Entertainment Pvt.Ltd and Aatpat Films. The filming began in December 2018 in Nagpur. The film starring Amitabh Bachchan, Akash Thosar, Rinku Rajguru and Ankush Gedam, is written and directed by Nagraj Manjule.

The film was released in theatres on 4 March 2022. It was a flop at the box office.

== Plot ==
Based on the life of Vijay Barse, the film is about a sports teacher, who, on the edge of retirement, makes a football team of children from a slum area, and how it changes their lives.

== Cast ==
- Amitabh Bachchan as Vijay Borade (based on Vijay Barse)
- Ankush Gedam as Ankush Masram/Don
- Akash Thosar as Sambhya
- Rinku Rajguru as Monica
- Sayli Patil as Bhavana
- Somnath Awghade as Imran
- Rajiya Suhel as Rajiya
- Angel Anthony as Angel
- Karthik Uikey as Kartik
- Priyanshu Thakur as Babu Chitre
- Jaspreet Singh Randhawa as Aman
- Tanaji Galgunde as Saajan
- Arbaj Shaikh as Raju
- Kiran Thoke as OK
- Chhaya Kadam as Ranjana Borade, Vijay Borade's Wife
- Arjun Radhakrishnan as Arjun Borade, Vijay's son
- Nagraj Manjule as Hitler Bhai
- Kishor Kadam as College Football Team Coach
- Bharat Ganeshpure as Local MLA
- Ramdas Phutane as Principal
- Vitthal Kale as "Scorer"

== Production ==
The filming of Jhund began in December 2018 at Nagpur. The story of the film is based on the life of Vijay Barse, founder of Slum Soccers. Bachchan plays a professor who motivates the street children to form a football team. This is Akash, Rinku, and Nagraj's second collaboration after their 2016 Marathi film Sairat. The film was wrapped up on 31 August 2019.

== Release ==
The film was scheduled for release on 20 September 2019, the date was tweeted by film critic and trade analyst Taran Adarsh. It was later postponed to 13 December 2019. On 21 January 2020, the film release date was announced to be 8 May 2020. The film was further postponed due to the COVID-19 pandemic. In October 2020, the film's released was put on hold while filmmakers work to resolve copyright issues in the courts. The film was released on 4 March 2022.

=== Home media ===
The film became available for streaming on ZEE5 on 6 May 2022, However 26 June 2022 World TV has been released and it has been acquired by Sony Max .

== Soundtrack ==
Jhund

Soundtrack album by Ajay–Atul
- Released: 19 February 2022
- Recorded: 2019
- Genre: Feature film soundtrack
- Length: 14:58
- Language: Hindi
- Label: T-Series

Ajay–Atul chronology
Tanhaji (2020)	Jhund (2022)	Ram Setu (2022)

Official audio
- Jhund - Full Album on YouTube

The music of the film is composed by Ajay–Atul with lyrics written by Amitabh Bhattacharya and Ajay–Atul (noted).

Track listing
No.	Title	Singer(s)	Length
1.	"Aaya Ye Jhund Hai" (Lyrics by Ajay–Atul)	Ajay–Atul, Jay, Mallhar, Sarja	3:18
2.	"Lafda Zhala"	Ajay Gogavale	3:55
3.	"Laat Maar"	Sid Sriram, Sourabh Abhyankar	3:45
4.	"Baadal Se Dosti"	Sid Sriram	4:00
Total length:			14:58

== Box office ==
Jhund is estimated to have collected a total of ₹14.76 crore by the end of the third week in India. In the end, the film stopped running with a collection of ₹29.6 crores.

== Reception ==
The film received highly positive reviews from critics praising the performance of ensemble cast, first half, humour, social message and visuals while the pacing in latter half was criticized. On the review aggregator website Rotten Tomatoes, 81% of 16 critics' reviews are positive, with an average rating of 6.6/10.

Saibal Chatterjee of NDTV gave the film a rating of 4.5/5 and wrote, "It upends the Bollywood sports biopic template and uses the game of football and an altered narrative form to craft an incisive and deeply felt commentary on the reality of the systemic oppression." Revathi Krishnan of The Print gave the film a rating of 4.5/5 and wrote, "Everyone should watch Jhund and question inner prejudices, what is talent, 'merit' and access. It evokes laughter and makes you cry as well." Taran Adarsh of Bollywood Hungama gave the film a rating of 4/5 and wrote, "With writing, direction and performance being its major strengths, JHUND makes for a superb entertainer." Stutee Ghosh of The Quint gave the film a rating of 4/5 and wrote, "Jhund is special for its determined eagerness to not please and to not treat Bachchan as the star. The veteran actor radiates warmth and a deep sense of humanity, making no concessions to commercial filmmaking." Sanjana Jadhav of Pinkvilla gave the film a rating of 4/5 and wrote, "The film keeps you invested in this team's journey through its heartbreaking climax, Manjule's social commentary, great acting and tugs right at your heart with its emotions."

Rachana Dubey of The Times Of India gave the film a rating of 3.5/5 and wrote, " There is a smattering of some colourful characters in the first half which adds to the energy and even includes humour.The pre-interval is high on energy but the pace slackens in the latter half." Tushar Joshi of India Today gave the film a rating of 3.5/5 and wrote, "Jhund is a rock-solid effort by director Nagraj Manjule, with Amitabh Bachchan towering over it all." Roktim Rajpal of Deccan Herald gave the film a rating of 3.5/5 and wrote, "Jhund has no scope for commercial elements like item songs and romance. The makers, fortunately, don't force these aspects into the narrative." Sukanya Verma of Rediff gave the film a rating of 3.5/5 and wrote, "Hands in pocket, eyes firmly focused on his mission, conviction inks his speech while his serene, sensitive, portrayal has a calming effect on the kids and Jhund." Shantanu Ray Chaudhuri of The Free Press Journal gave the film a rating of 3.5/5 and wrote, "One of the pleasures of the film is its unconventional structure – a heady, almost wilfully haphazard first half, followed by a leisurely paced and painstakingly detailed second one."

The Hans India gave the film a rating of 3/5 and wrote, "On the whole, the movie is worth watching as Amitabh Bachchan aka Vijay delivered his best and trains the slum boys with all his dedication!" Mayank Shekhar of Mid-Day gave the film a rating of 3/5. Shubhra Gupta of Indian Express gave the film a rating of 2/5 and wrote, "This Nagraj Manjule film can never quite make up its mind whether it wants to treat Amitabh Bachchan's Borade as a hero, or focus the spotlight on the hardscrabble lives of the slum kids." Anna M. M. Vetticad of Firstpost gave the film a rating of 2/5 and wrote, "Jhund, despite its grand ambitions and good intentions, it fails to click as a cohesive, gripping whole."

In the trailer of the movie Jhund, there is a photo frame of Dr. Babasaheb Ambedkar which is being discussed on social media. Along with B. R. Ambedkar, Shivaji Maharaj, Shahu Maharaj and Mahatma Phule are also in this frame. Director Nagraj Manjule said in an interview about the Jhund, "The Jhund is the story of a group which is far from easy opportunities. It's a group that is on the path to success or far from where the opportunity arises. It's a group that is self-defeating, and that's the thing about it."
