= Fandry =

2013 Marathi film

- Film poster
- Directed by: Nagraj Manjule
- Produced by: Navalakha Arts; Holy Basil Productions
- Starring: Kishor Kadam; Somnath Awghade; Suraj Pawar; Chhaya Kadam; Nagraj Manjule; Rajeshwari Kharat
- Cinematography: Vikram Amladi
- Edited by: Chandan Arora
- Music by: Songs: Ajay–Atul; Score: Alokananda Dasgupta
- Distributed by: Reliance Media Works; Zee Entertainment
- Release dates: 17 October 2013 (MIFF); 14 February 2014 (India)
- Running time: 104 minutes
- Country: India
- Language: Marathi
- Budget: ₹1.75 crore
- Box office: ₹7 crore

Fandry (The Pig) (Note: This word is from Kaikadi, a language related to Tamil (Pandry is the equivalent term in Tamil).) is a 2013 Indian Marathi-language film, written and directed by Nagraj Manjule, in his directorial debut. It stars Somnath Awghade, Suraj Pawar, and Rajeshwari Kharat. The story focuses on a young boy's love amidst caste-based discrimination. The film, set in Akolner, a village near Ahmednagar, revolves around the issue of discrimination in India's caste system and narrates the story of a teenager from a Dalit family who lives at the village fringe, and falls in love with an upper-caste girl.

The film won the Grand Jury Prize at the MAMI Film Festival. The film was released theatrically on Valentine's Day 2014. At the 61st National Film Awards, it won the Indira Gandhi Award for Best Debut Film of a Director.

== Plot ==
In the village of Akolner, a pre-teen named Jambhuvant Kachru Mane, nicknamed Jabya (Somnath Awghade), lives in a makeshift house on the outskirts of a caste-segregated village with his parents and two older sisters (one a widow with a toddler). The family belongs to the Kaikadi community, an oppressed caste, and earns a living by doing menial jobs. Owing to the caste-ridden power structure of the village society, the boy's father has a fearful and submissive personality which is exploited by upper-caste villagers.

Jabya is disillusioned by the predicament of his family and shows interest in school where he has also fallen in one-sided love with a forward caste girl named Shalini, nicknamed Shalu (Rajeshwari Kharat), who he has never talked to but tries desperately to get her to notice him. His upper caste classmate bullys him as if a lower caste boy has no right to secretly love an upper caste girl. Jabya along with his school friend Pirya (Suraj Pawar) and armed with a slingshot, spends time after school trying to catch a black sparrow in the wilderness. However, the bird call that punctuates the film is that of the red-wattled lapwing (titawi), which is supposed to bring bad luck. The black sparrow, with its distinctive forked tail, and the call of the red wattled lapwing occur repeatedly throughout the film.

Jabya also befriends a bicycle mechanic named Chankya (Nagraj Manjule) who sees his young self in the boy. Chankya had once married a wealthy, upper-caste girl, but she was soon forcefully taken away by her brother, who beat him very badly. Since then he has renounced family life and taken up refuge in spirituality, mysticism and liquor. Jabya seeks support from Chankya in his quest to obtain his love, which Chankya readily extends.

Back in the village, Jabya's family members comply as they are exploited and dehumanized by the villagers over and over again. A marriage proposal arrives for Jabya's sister and his father agrees to pay a ₹20,000 dowry to the groom's family, placing further financial stress on the family. He is eventually contracted to kill a pig that has been rampaging the village by its upper-caste members, who see it as a bad omen. Kachru is initially hesitant to catch the pig, but later agrees to. This requires the help of the whole family, deeply embarrassing Jabya as they have to chase the pig in front of his classmates, including Shalu.

The embarrassment too much to bear, he hides in an alley, refusing to help his family. There, he finally spots the black sparrow, and his objective becomes clear: according to a local legend, it is believed that when the ash obtained by burning the black sparrow is sprinkled on someone, it hypnotizes them to fall in love with the person sprinkling it. The idea, however, is executed only in Jabya's dream—his father finds him and chases away the bird, then beats him publicly.

In the film's climax, the family catches the pig as they are jeered at and harassed. In the procession following immediately, the taunts and insults towards Jabya intensify, including calling him "fandry", meaning pig in the Kaikadi language. Generally composed up to this point, he finally explodes in rage, dropping the pig and starting to throw rocks at his oppressors. In the final shot of the film, he throws a rock directly at the camera, subtly breaking the fourth wall.

== Cast ==
- Somnath Awghade as Jambuwant Kachru Mane (Jabya), the protagonist, a dalit teenager, fighting his societal expectations while harboring his impossible love with a classmate of another caste.
- Suraj Pawar as Piraji (Pirya), Jabya's loyal and compassionate friend through the film.
- Chhaya Kadam as Nani, Jabya's mother, focused on tradition and stern affection, often clashing with Jabya's dreams
- Kishor Kadam as Kachru Mane (Nana),
- Rajeshwari Kharat as Shalini (Shalu), Jabya's love interest, she is a sweet and kind girl, who symbolizes his want for a better life beyond the restrictions of caste.
- Bhushan Manjule as Dada Patil, is a demanding and powerful figure in the village, that perpetuates the social hierarchies and caste system.
- Nagraj Manjule as Chankeshwar Sathe (Chankya)
- Sohail Shaikh as Sangram
- Sanjay Chaudhri as Teacher
- Vikas Pandurang Patil as Navhi
- Prashant Kamble
- Jyoti Subhash
- Suhas Sirsat
- Moinuddin Inamdar as the Principal
- Pooja Dolas as Vedant's mother
- Shruti Awate as Rani
- Sakshi Vyavhare as Dhurpa
- Pravin Tarde as Sarpanch, the village head
- Suresh Vishwakarma as Patil
- Aishwarya Shinde as Surki

== Release ==
The film released all over Maharashtra on 14 February 2014 and it was released in Gujarat, Madhya Pradesh and Goa along with 12 states on 28 February 2014.Fandry was released in the United States, the United Kingdom, and the Gulf Countries; subsequently, it was released digitally in 110 countries.

== Soundtrack ==
The soundtrack album of Fandry received positive reviews from critics globally. The composers, a duo of brothers called Ajay-Atul, specialize in Indian film scores and are from Maharashtra.

Track listing
No.	Title	Artist	Length
1.	"Tuzya Priticha Vinchu Chawla"	Ajay–Atul	5:10
2.	"Fandry Theme Song"	Ajay–Atul	3:11
Total length:			8:21

== Awards ==
Festival / Awards	Category	Result
Pune International Film Festival	Best Film, Best Film (Audience), Best Director, Best Cinematography, Best Actor	Won
Indian Film Festival of Los Angeles	National Bank Best First Feature Film Award	Won
National Award	Best Debut (Director), Best Child Actor	Won
