= Free Hit Danka =

- Theatrical release poster
- Directed by: Sunil Magare
- Screenplay by: Sanjay Navgire; Sunil Magare
- Story by: Sunil Magare
- Produced by: Umesh Narke; Dharmendra Singh; Prasad Shetty; Vikas Kamble; Praveen Jadhav; Sunil Magare
- Starring: Somnath Awghade; Tanaji Galgunde; Arbaz Shaikh; Suresh Vishwakarma
- Cinematography: Veerdhaval Patil; Shaikh Hazarath Vali
- Edited by: Parag Sawant
- Music by: Baban Adagle; Ashok Kamble
- Production company: SGM Films
- Distributed by: Sunshine Studios (Ankit Chandiramani)
- Release date: 17 December 2021
- Country: India
- Language: Marathi

Free Hit Danka is a 2021 Indian Marathi-language comedy drama film directed by Sunil Magare. The film stars Somnath Awghade, Tanaji Galgunde, Arbaz Shaikh and Suresh Vishwakarma. It was theatrically released on 17 December 2021.

== Plot ==
A man and a woman fall in love, but their relationship is complicated by the fact that they come from two villages that have been feuding for years over a cricket tournament.

== Cast ==
- Somnath Awghade as Santosh
- Tanaji Galgunde as Rangya
- Arbaz Shaikh as Vikas
- Suresh Vishwakarma
- Anil Nagarkar
- Apurva Shelgaokar
- Ganesh Deshmukh
- Sudhir Nikam
- Pratibha Wale
- Chitra Kulkarni
- Pranali Dhaware

== Release ==
The film was theatrically released on 17 December 2021.

== Soundtrack ==
Free Hit Danka

Soundtrack album by Baban Adagle, Ashok Kamble
- Released: 2021
- Genre: Feature film soundtrack
- Length: 13:56
- Language: Marathi
- Label: Zee Music Company

Official audio
- Free Hit Danka - Full Album on YouTube

Music is given by Baban Adagle and Ashok Kamble.

All lyrics are written by Sanjay Navgire; all music is composed by Baban Adagle and Ashok Kamble.

Track listing
No.	Title	Singer (s)	Length
1.	"Hoil Dandi Gul"	Anand Shinde, J-Subodh, Ray Marshall	3:21
2.	"Rang Pirticha Bawara"	Jasraj Joshi, Soumee Sailesh	2:17
3.	"Ha Rang Chadhu De"	Rahul Deshpande	3:10
Total length:			13:56
