= Gast (film) =

2021 Indian Marathi-language film

- Directed by: Amit Koli
- Written by: Kalpesh Jagtap
- Produced by: Anvay Naykodi; Bhavesh Janavlekar
- Starring: Tanaji Galgunde; Monalisa Bagal; Shashank Shende
- Cinematography: Kaushal Goswami
- Edited by: Anant Kamath
- Music by: Aditya Bedekar
- Production company: Rush Media
- Distributed by: Zee Talkies
- Release date: 28 February 2021
- Running time: 107 minutes
- Country: India
- Language: Marathi

Gast is a 2021 Indian Marathi-language romantic drama film directed by Amit Koli and produced by Anvay Naykodi, Bhavesh Janavlekar. The film stars Tanaji Galgunde, Monalisa Bagal, Shashank Shende and Arbaz Sheikh. It was theatrically released on 28 February 2021.

== Plot ==
When thieves attack a village, the residents decide to rigorously patrol the area to avoid future robberies. Unfortunately, this causes problems with the romance between youngsters Amar and Sujatha.

== Cast ==
- Tanaji Galgunde as Amar
- Monalisa Bagal as Sujata
- Shashank Shende as Hari Bhunge
- Arbaz Shaikh as Chinya
- Jayant Sawarkar as Vamanrao

== Production ==
It is produced by Rush Media in association with Zee Talkies. The film was shot in locations of Kolhapur district.

== Home media ==
The digital streaming rights of the film are acquired by Zee Talkies and was directly premiered on Zee Talkies on 28 February 2021. It is also available for streaming on ZEE5.
