= Arbaj Shaikh =

Indian actor

Arbaj Shaikh (Note: Also spelled as Arbaz Shaikh) is an Indian actor known for his work in Marathi cinema, primarily known for portraying supporting roles. He made his debut in the 2016 film Sairat and has since appeared in several films, including Free Hit Danka (2021), Jhund (2022), Ghar Banduk Biryani (2023), Musandi (2023), Sangharsh Yoddha Manoj Jarange Patil (2024).

== Filmography ==
=== Film ===
Note: All movies are in Marathi, unless mentioned.

Year	Film	Role	Notes	Ref.
2016	Sairat	Salim Shaikh "Salya"	Debut	
2021	Basta			
2021	Gast	Chinya		
2021	Free Hit Danka	Vikas		
2022	Jhund	Raju	Hindi film	
2022	Ekdam Kadak	Vashya		
2023	Ghar Banduk Biryani			
2023	Musandi			
2024	Sangharsh Yoddha Manoj Jarange Patil	News reporter		
2024	Yaari			
2026	Picture Boyz			

=== Web series ===
Year	Title	Role	Language	Ref.
2026	Matka King		Hindi	

=== Television ===
Year	Title	Role	Ref.
2017	Comidichi GST Express	Krishna	
2021–2022	Man Jhala Bajind	Papya	

=== Music video ===
Year	Title	Director	Notes
2022	"Do or Die"	Samarth Londhe	

== Personal life ==
Arbaj Shaikh opened his own café, 'Bake Buddies,' on 8 February 2024. He shared details about it on social media, and the café was inaugurated on 11 February 2024. It is situated at Ambegaon Budruk in Pune.

He married his girlfriend Simran in May 2026; they had been in a relationship for 4–5 years.
