= Gaganbawada =

- town
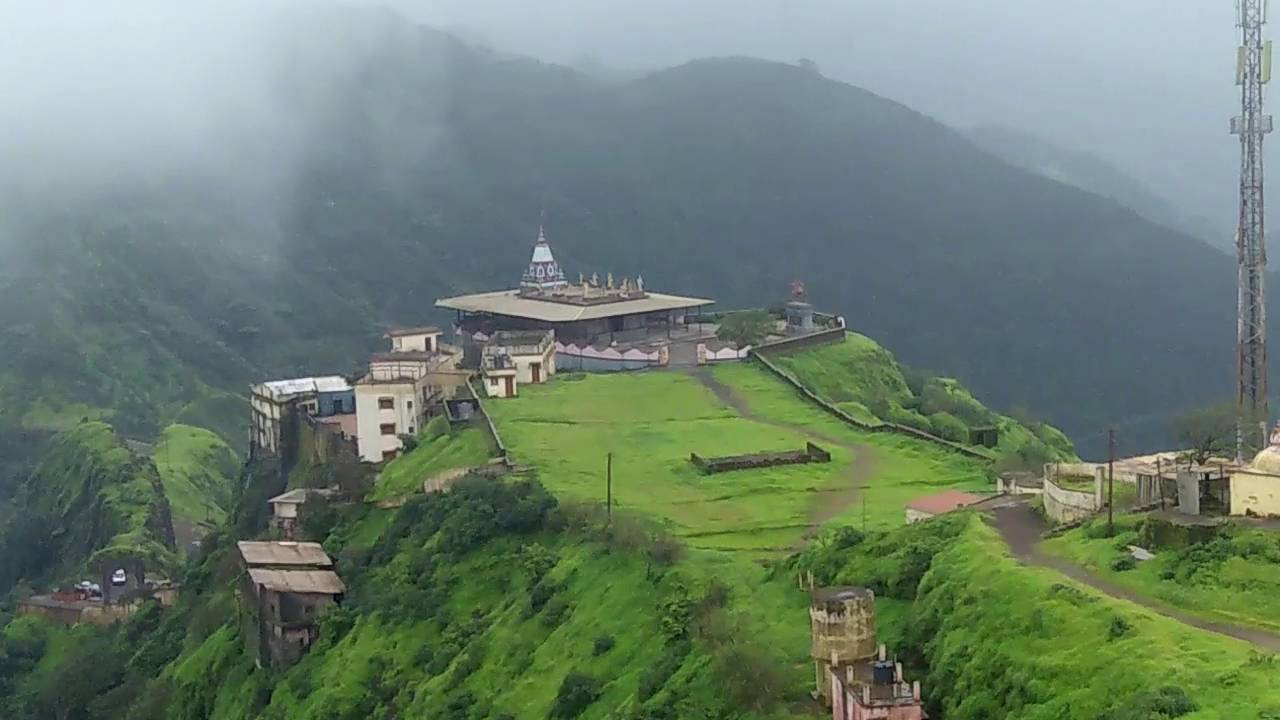
- Gagangad

- Location in Maharashtra, India
- Coordinates: 16.5457904°N 73.8311296°E
- Country: India
- State: Maharashtra
- District: Kolhapur

Government
  - Type: Panchayat Raj
  - Body: Gram Panchayat

Population (2001)
  - Total: 4,000

Languages
  - Official: Marathi
- Time zone: UTC+5:30 (IST)
- Postal code: 416206
- Telephone code: 02326
- Vehicle registration: MH-09
- Nearest city: Kolhapur/Kankavali/Rajapur
- Civic agency: Gram Panchayat
- Climate: Cool, Heavy rainfall area (Köppen)

Gaganbawada is a town situated in the district of Kolhapur in Maharashtra, India. It is located 55 km by road from Kankavli. It is one of the taluka headquarters in Kolhapur district.

== History ==
Gaganbawada used to be called Bawada Mahal and comprise the current Gaganbawada tehsil of Kolhapur district and the current entire Vaibhavwadi taluka of Sindhudurg district. In 1981, Sindhudurg became the independent district. The entire Vaibhavwadi area which used to be a part of Gaganbawada Tehsil was at the foothills of Sahyadri and it was very tedious for people living at the foothills to come to Gaganbawaba for their daily needs. So the portion of Sahyadri foothills was separated from Gaganbawada tehsil of Kolhapur District and joined to the Sindhudurg District. At that time the villages called Vaibhavwadi, Karul, Bhuibawada, Umbarde, Tithavali, Achirne, etc. became a part of Sindhudurg district and Vaibhavwadi became the tehsil headquarters.

During the rule of the Marathas and British Raj], the Bavda estate was 243 sq.mi in extent.

The Gagangiri Ashram and fort is only 1 km from Gaganbawada of Kolhapur district above Sahyadri range but geographically it is a part of Vaibhavwadi Tehsil of Sindhudurg district which is at the foothills of Sahyadri range.

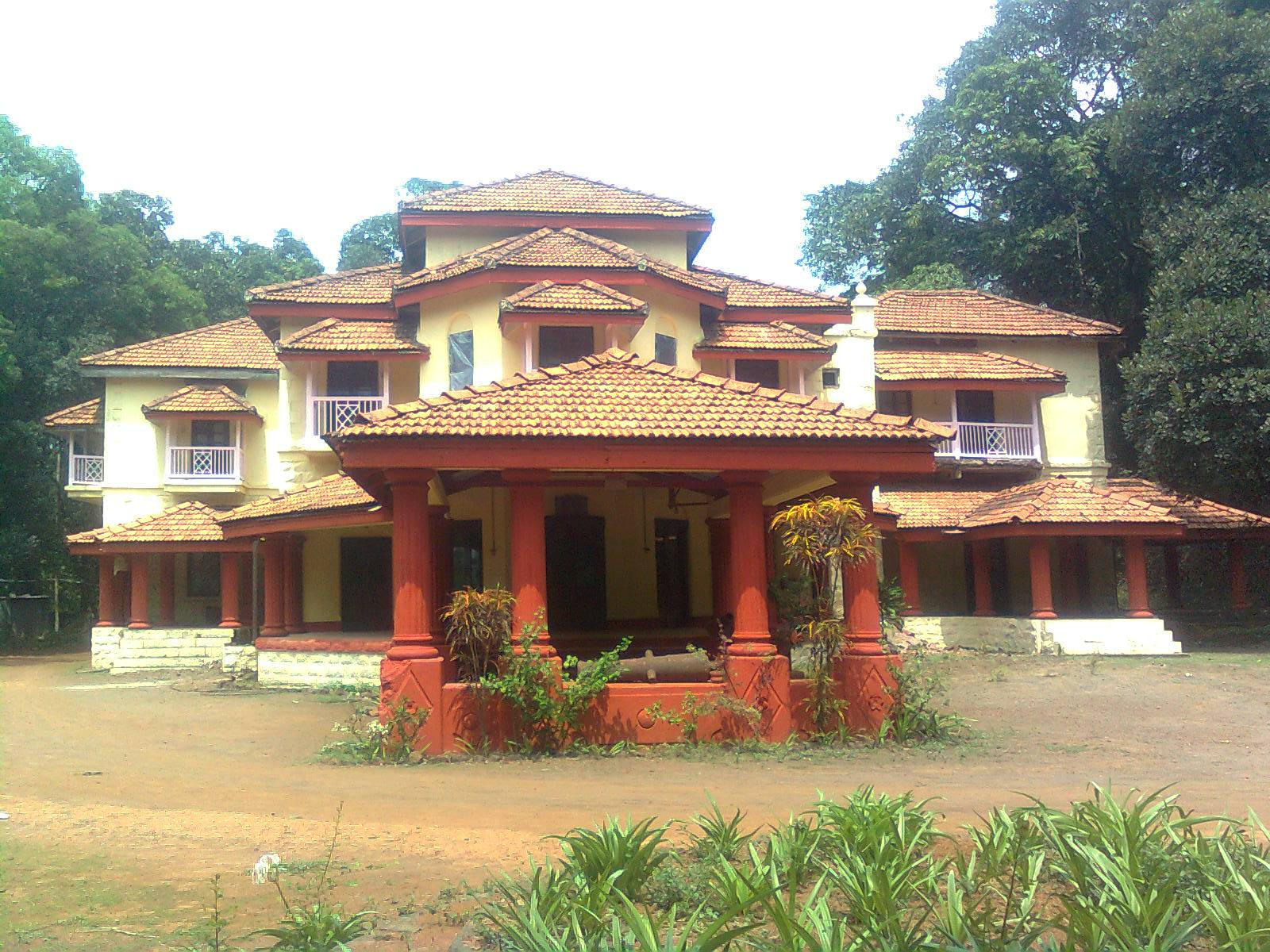
amatya wada palasambe

=== Jahagirdars of Bavda ===
- Meherban Shrimant Madahvrao Moreshwar Pant Amatya

== Geography ==
Gaganbawada, situated on the Sahyadri range or the Western ghats also has the famous fort Gagangad near it. Though only 55 km from Kolhapur, it is a non developed, rural area. This place gets the maximum rainfall during rainy season. It is on the threshold of the famous Karul Ghat & Bhuibawada Ghat. Perhaps this is the only place with two ghats originating at a single place but going towards different directions, one towards Talere-Kankavali (Karul Ghat) and another towards Kharepatan-Rajapur (Bhuibawada Ghat). The Kolhapur district boundary ends immediately after Gaganbawada and Sindhudurg District starts just at the beginning of Karul Ghat and Bhuibawada Ghat. From Gaganbawada bus stand, road to the left will take one to the Karul Ghat and road to the right will take you to the Bhuibawada Ghat. The Karul Ghat starts immediately after Gaganbawada village (1 km from bus stand). Karul Ghat goes towards Northern part of Sindhudurg District. Tha quality of road is good. Length of Karul Ghat is 11 km. The entire ghat comes under the administration of Vaibhavwadi Tehsil of Sindhudurg. This ghat is beautiful and very scenic in monsoon. This ghat ends just before Vaibhavwadi and the state highway ends at Talere village (NH 17). The other ghat called Bhuibawada Ghat starts at the right turn from Gaganbawada Bus stand. This entire ghat also comes in Vaibhavwadi Tehsil of Sindhudurg. The ghat is of 10 km length with medium quality road and useful for people going towards southern part of Ratnagiri District's Rajapur area. This ghat ends at Bhuibawada and this road will further take one to Kharepatan Town (NH 17).

== In popular culture ==
The famous Marathi movies called Pachadlela (2004) and Kaal Ratri Bara Vajta (1991) were shot in the village of Palsambe just 7 km before Gaganbawada on Kolhapur-Gaganbawada road. The wada (bungalow) shown in these movies is very scenic place. Kumbhi river flows behind it. Hemant Jangal Awtade's directorial 2023 action comedy film Ghar Banduk Biryani was filmed in the town.

== Points of interest ==
Gaganbawada offers views of the mountain ranges of Western Ghats which change each season. It has a rich historical and mythological background and is home to a range of biodiversity. The flora and fauna in the forests around Gaganbawada will mesmerise any nature lover.

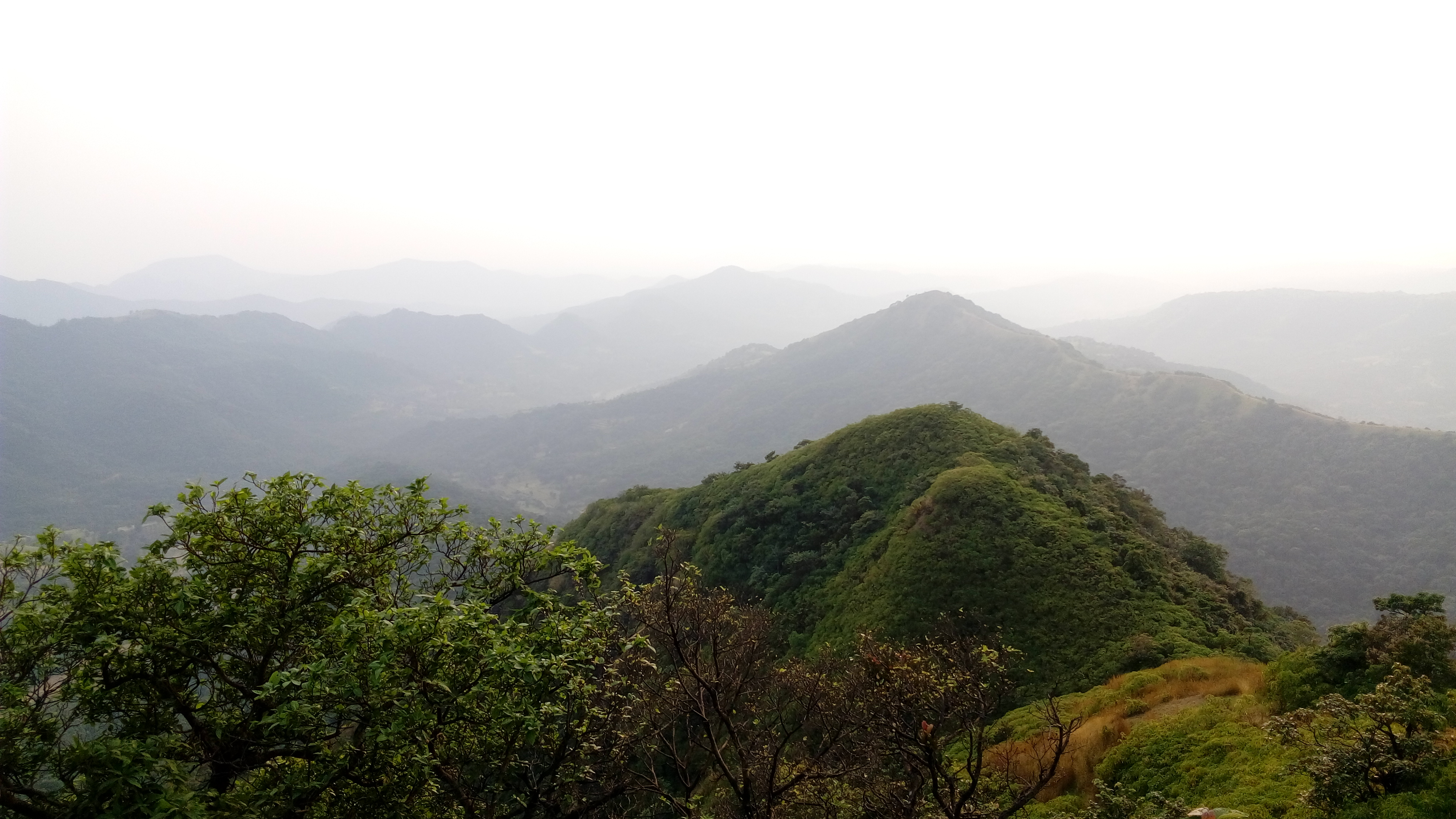
View from Karul Ghat

Karul Ghat & Bhuibawada Ghat - These two ghats are one of the most scenic routes which originate from Gaganbawada and connect the Deccan Plateau to coastal region, Konkan, of Maharashtra. Karul Ghat descends towards Vaibbhavwadi and is 19 km in length. The road condition is pretty good. This route further goes up to Talere and meets NH17 (Mumbai-Goa highway). Bhuibawada Ghat is smaller compared to Karul and descends towards Bhuibawada Village. This ghat is of 11 km but road is narrow and not in good condition. Both The ghats have scenic views of valleys and hills. At the start of both the ghats near Gaganbawada there are view points from where one can enjoy the sun set.

Gagangad Fort and Gagangiri Ashram - 1 km from Gaganbawada town lay ruins of Gagangad Fort. During British rule it was the headquarters of Gaganbawada tehsil, comprising around 243 square miles now known as Sidhudurg District. There are a small mosque and Bhavani temple in the fort. The guarding walls of the fort can be seen at some places. During his early penance days Shri Gagangiri Maharaj settled in a cave known as Garbhagiri near the fort and perfected his tantrik techniques. Now there is a temple of Gurudatta and ashram of devotees of Shri Gagangiri Maharaj. During Datta jayanti, a large number of devotees visit the place and it is one of the main festivals of Gaganbawada town.

Morjai Temple and Plateau - For a hiking enthusiasts Morjai Plateau near Gaganbawada is Must visit. 8 km from the town at height of 980 MSL this laterite plateau is perfect example of "Sada Ecosystem". One can drive down till the base of plateau and then hike up. The hike is moderate and generally takes about 45 minutes to reach the top. At the end of the plateau stands a unique cave temple of Morjai goddess. Morjai is known as the goddess of peace and people come here to solve their disputes in front of her. A local pujari Mr Gurav 72 years of age does the hike twice a day to light a lamp and clean the temple. As the monsoon comes to an end the plateau becomes a carpet of wildflowers. Some nature enthusiasts call it "Kaas" of Kolhapur district.

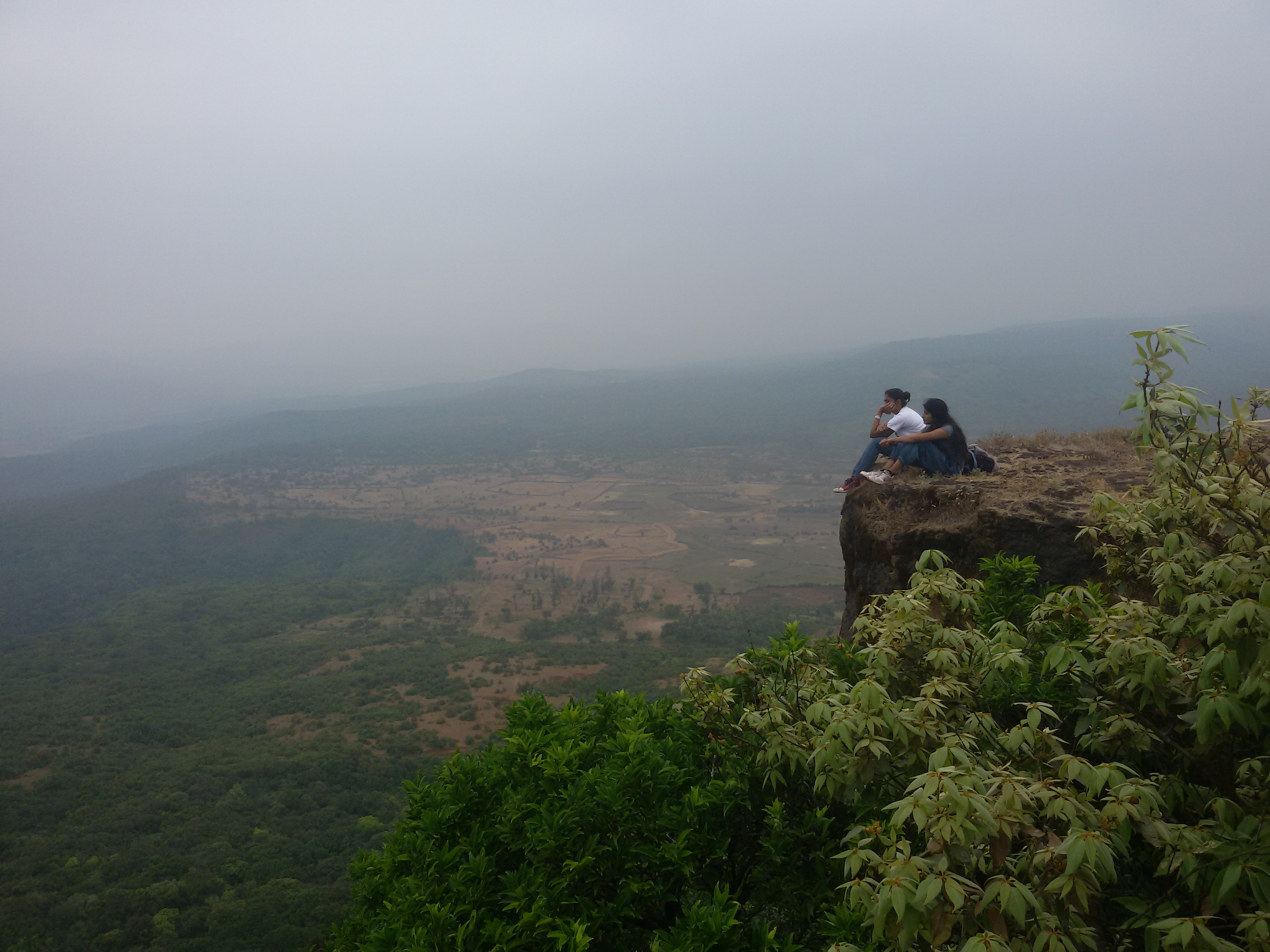
Morjai Plateau

Lakhmapur Dam - On the way to Morjai from Gaganbawada one can also visit to a Lakhmapur Dam. This 1.6 TMC capacity dam is one of the largest water bodies in the area. Water is mainly used for irrigation of farms. It also has a small hydro-electricity generation unit.

Pandav Caves - Pandav Caves, commonly known as Ramling are 8 km from Gagagnbawada. These caves are located near small village called Palsambe. Situated in a small gorge created by stream these caves are believed to be carved by Bhima in one night. There are three monolithic structures, "Sadhana Ghar", which were used as places of meditation during ancient days. the references of these caves are even found in the literature dating back to 5th century.

D. Y. Patil Sugar Factory - D. Y. Patil Sugar Factory is the only big industry in this area and provides a guided tour of the sugar making process.

Bavdekar Bungalow - Next to the sugar factory stands this magnificent bungalow once inhabited by then Jahagirdar of Gaganbawada Shri Madhavrao Pandit Pant Amatya. Though used rarely by the descendants of Pant Amatya the bungalow is well maintained and has been featured in few movies and serials, its featured in the 2004 Marathi horror-comedy film Pachadlela directed by Mahesh Kothare. The heirs of Shri Madhavrao are planning to start a small museum in this bungalow soon.

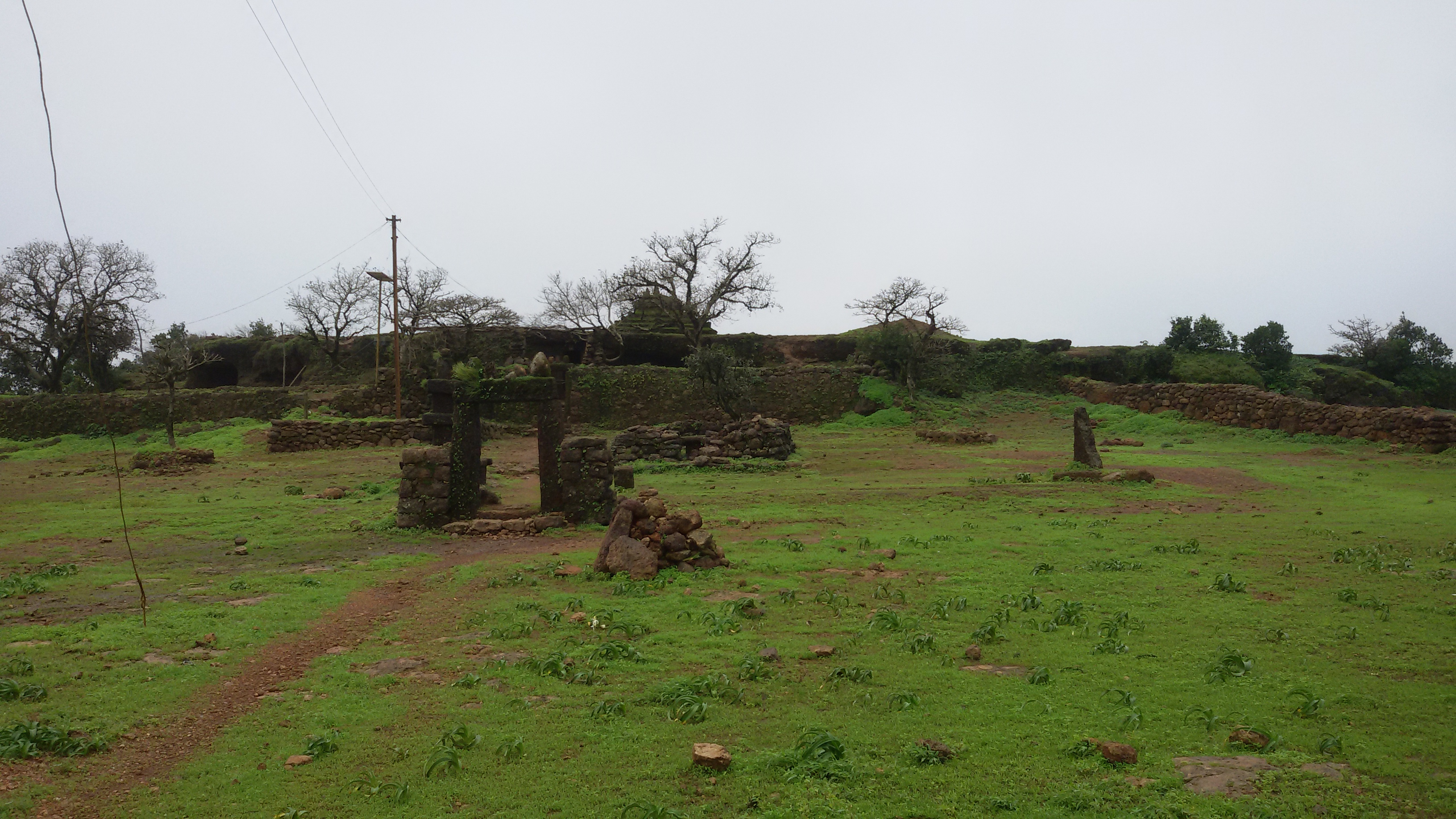
Morjai Temple

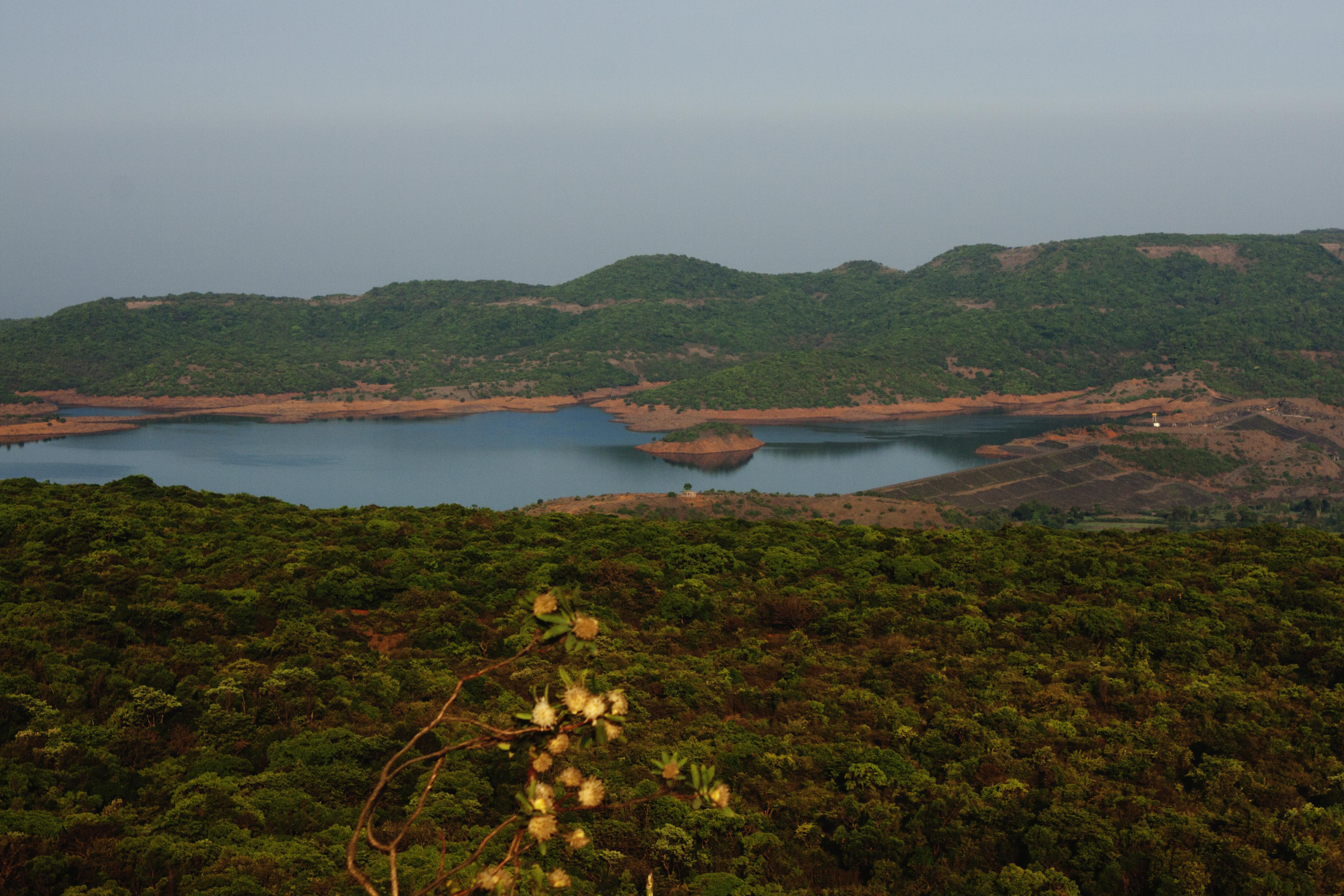
Aerial view of Lakhmapur Dam

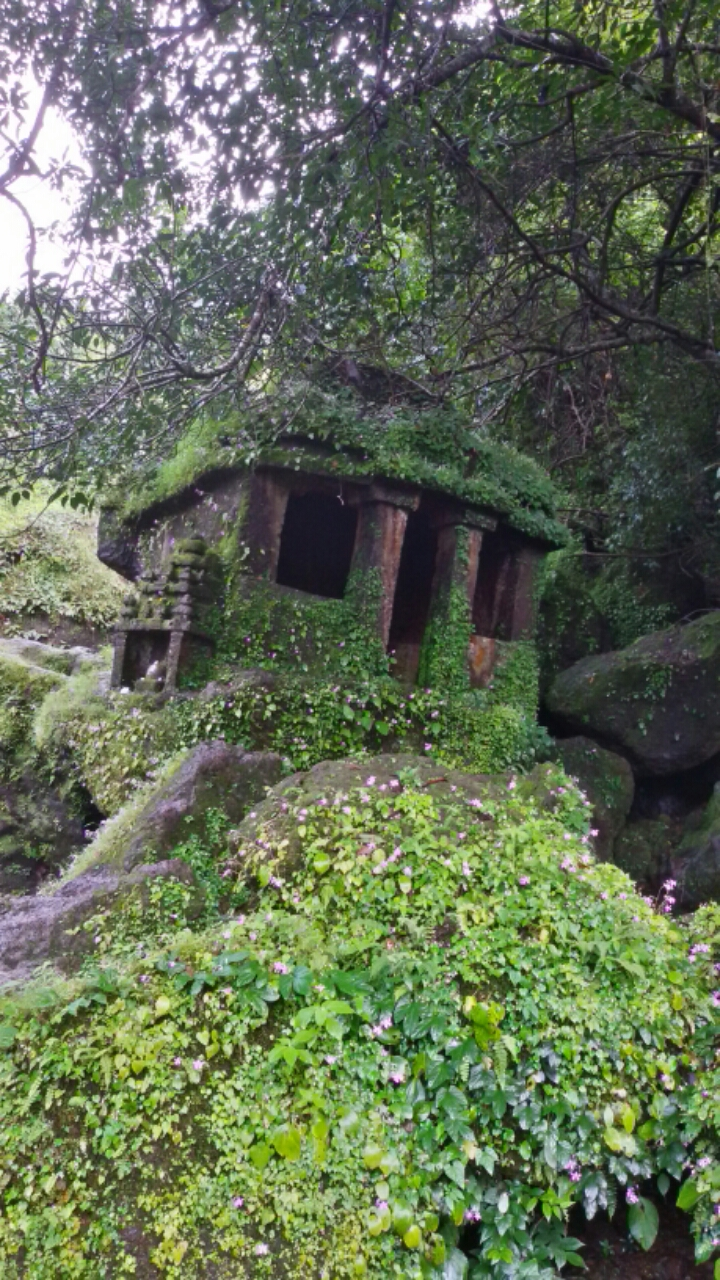
Pandav Caves

Biodiversity - The forests around Gaganbawada are extremely rich in biodiversity. For nature enthusiasts Gaganbawada has many surprises. More than 120 species of birds, 50 species of butterflies, 21 species of mammals inhabit the forests of Gaganbawada. These forests are also home to many medicinal plants and herbs.

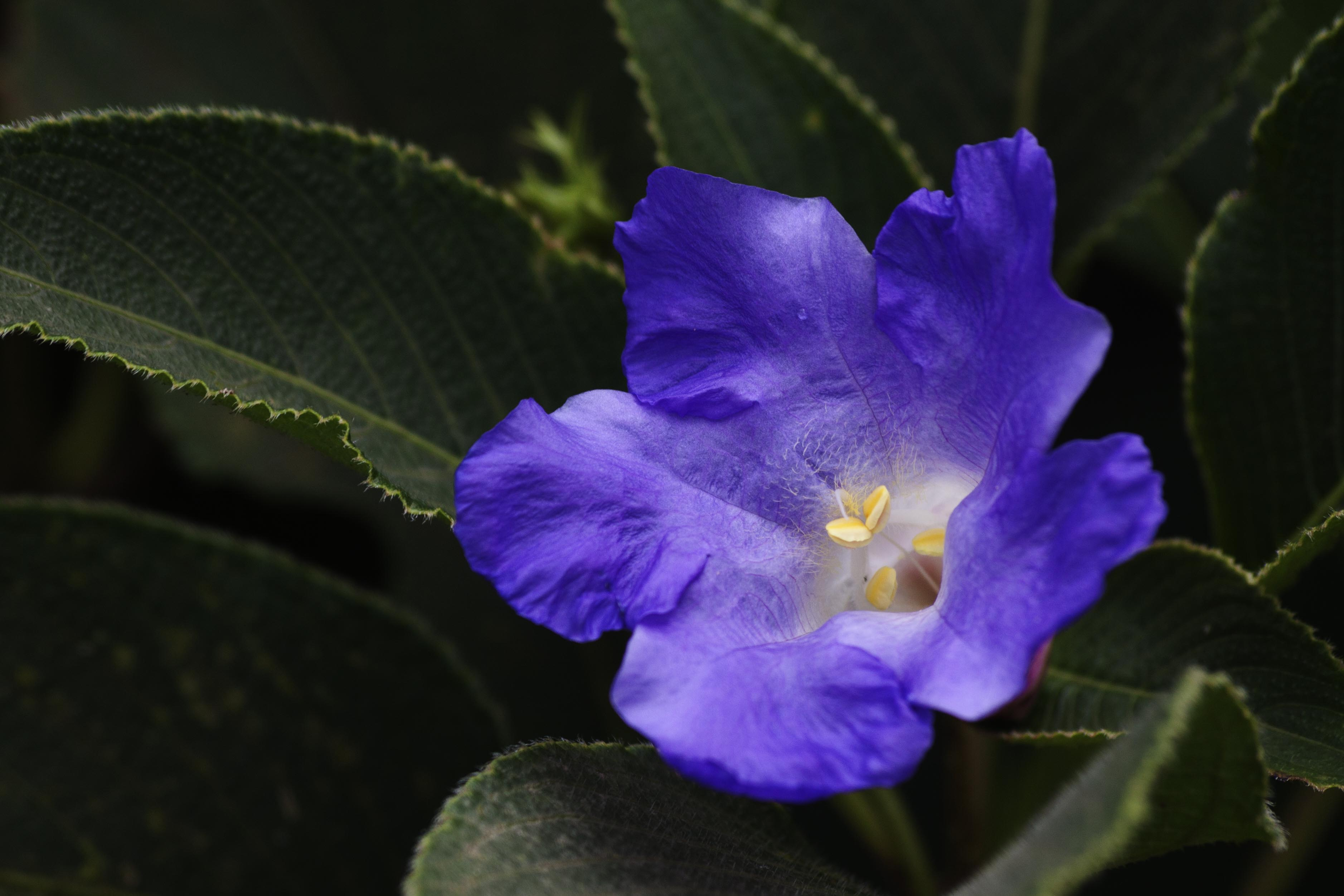
Karvi Flower

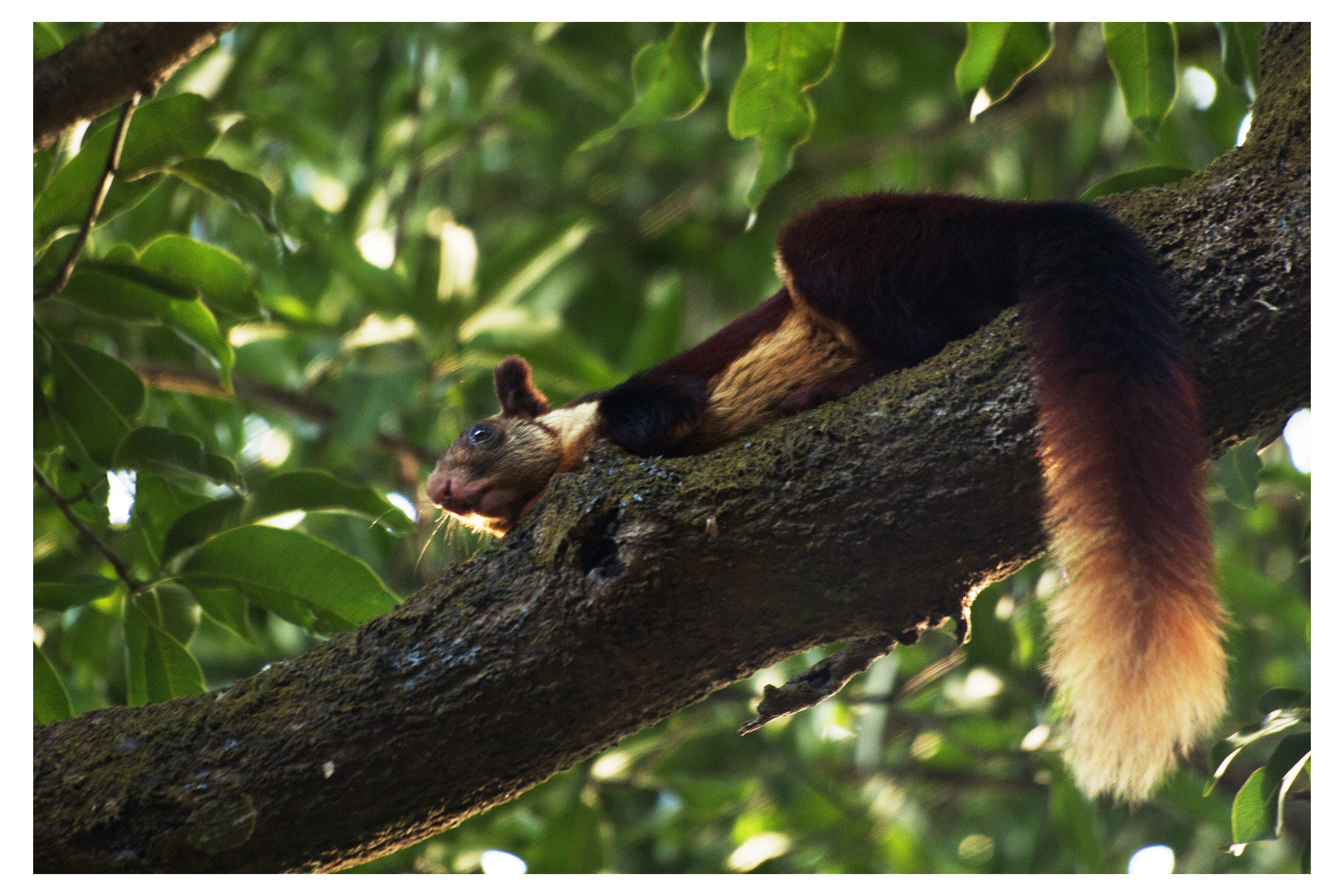
Malabar Giant Squirrel near The Camp

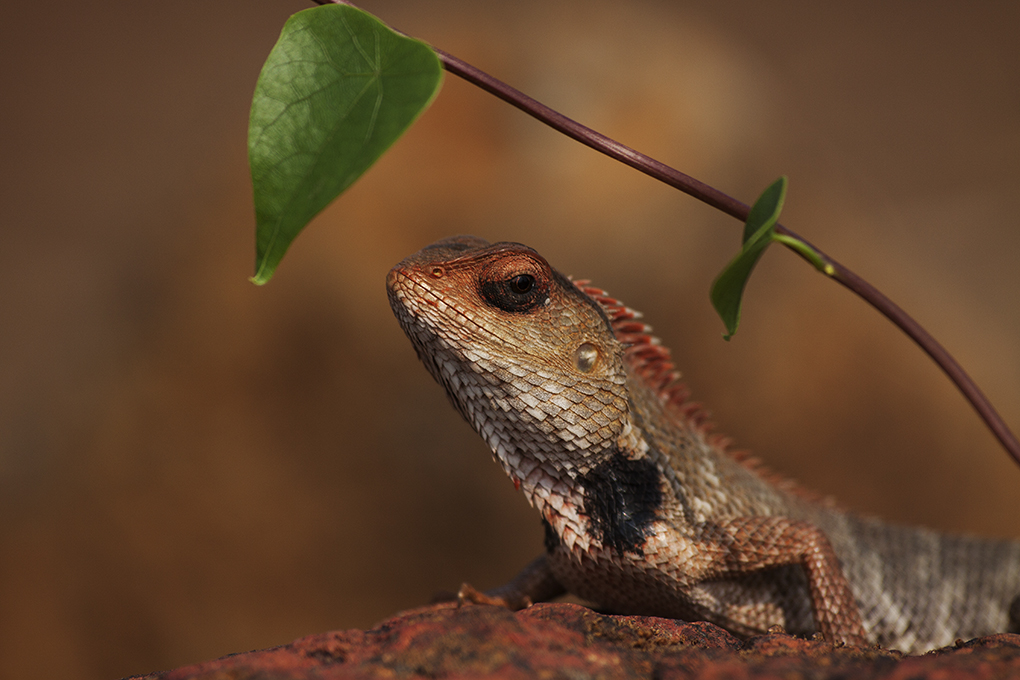
Calotes Versicolor

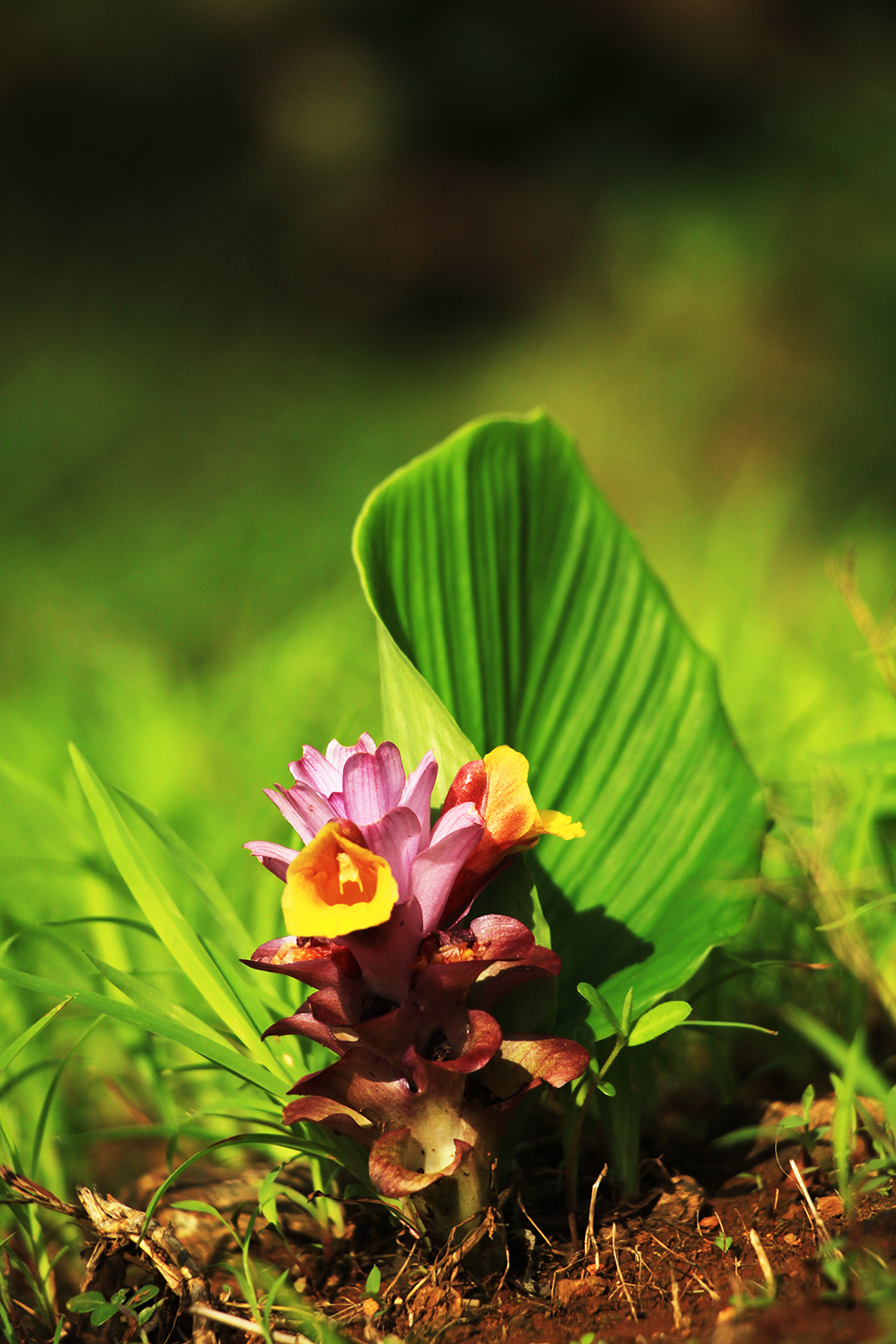
Wild Turmeric flowers of Gaganbawada

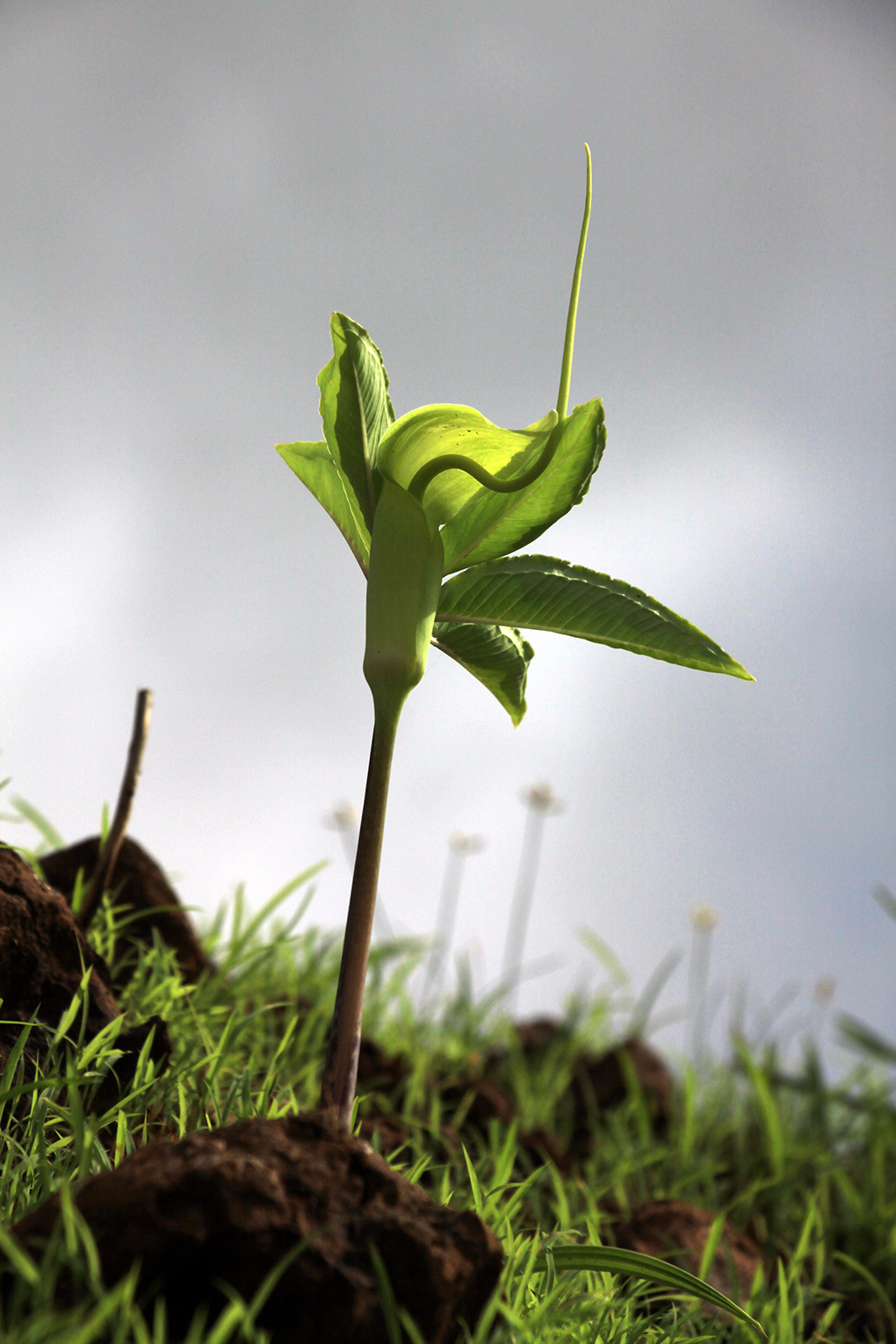
Wildflowers of GB

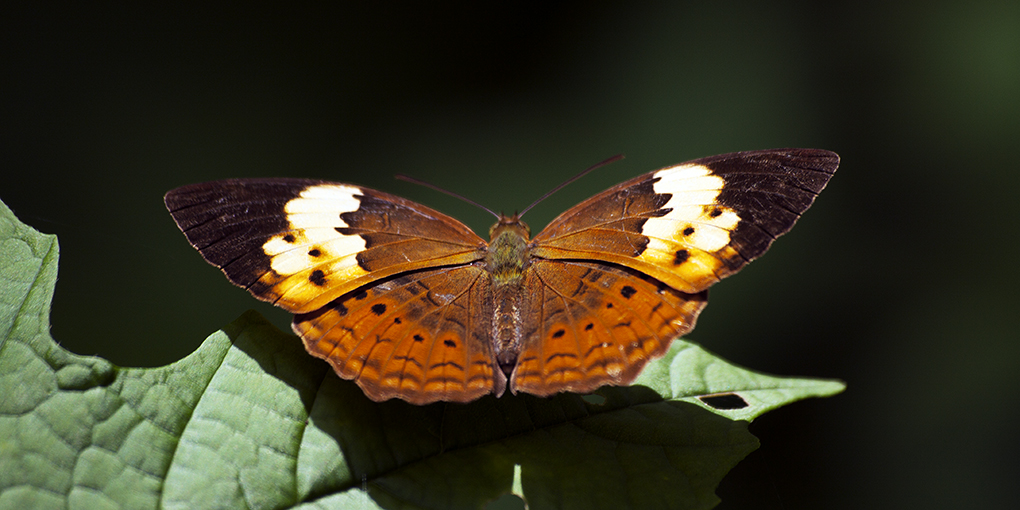
Rustic Butterfly
