= Basta (film) =

- Theatrical release poster Concept _tanaji ghadage
- Directed by: Tanaji Ghadge
- Written by: Arvind Jagtap
- Produced by: Sunil Phadtare
- Starring: Sayali Sanjeev; Subodh Bhave; Parth Bhalerao; Suraj Pawar; Jyoti Subhash; Shubhangi Gokhale
- Cinematography: Surya Mishra; Krishna Soren
- Edited by: Ashish Mhatre; Apurva Motiwale
- Music by: Santosh Mulekar
- Release date: 29 January 2021
- Running time: 120 minutes
- Country: India
- Language: Marathi

Basta is a 2021 Indian Marathi-language comedy drama film directed by Tanaji Ghadge and produced by Sunil Phadtare. The film stars Sayali Sanjeev, Subodh Bhave and Parth Bhalerao. It was released in India on 29 January 2021.

== Plot ==
The story of this film is about families of a bride and groom who goes shopping (Marathi: बस्ता) for their wedding. During the shopping various comedy drama events takes place.

== Cast ==
- Sayali Sanjeev
- Subodh Bhave
- Parth Bhalerao
- Bharat Ganeshpure
- Shubhangi Gokhale
- Suhas Palshikar
- Pallavi Patil
- Suraj Pawar
- Arbaz Shaikh
- Jyoti Subhash
- Prajakta Hanamghar
- Kalpana Jagtap
- Madhavi Juvekar
- Rohit Chavan
- Kishore Chougule
- Sagar Karande
- Sanjay Kulkarni
- Kishor Mahabole
- Neeta Shende
- Yogesh Shirsat
- Akshay Tanksale

== Release ==
=== Theatrical ===
The film was theatrically released on 29 January 2021.

=== Home media ===
It is available for streaming on ZEE5.

== Accolades ==
Year	Award	Category	Nominee	Result	Ref.
57th Maharashtra State Film Awards	Maharashtra State Film Awards	Best Editor	Ashish mhatr Apoorva motiwale	Won	
57th Maharashtra State Film Awards	Maharashtra State Film Awards	Best Comedian	Parth Bhalerao	Won	
57th Maharashtra State Film Awards	Maharashtra State Film Awards	Best Supporting Actress	Suhas Palshikar	Nominated	
