= Tanaji Galgunde =

Indian actor

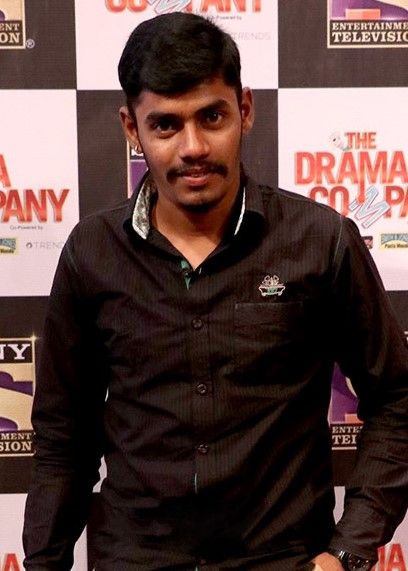
- Galgunde in 2017
- Born: Solapur, Maharashtra, India
- Occupation: Actor
- Years active: 2016–present
- Known for: Sairat (2016)
- Television: Man Jhala Bajind; The Drama Company
- Spouse: Pratiksha Shetty (m. 2024)

Tanaji Galgunde is an Indian actor primarily works in Marathi cinema best known for role in Sairat, which he was nominated for Filmfare Marathi Award for Best Actor in a Supporting Role. He made his Bollywood debut in 2022 with the film Jhund.

== Early and personal life ==
Tanaji Galgunde is from Solapur, Maharashtra. Before working in films, he was doing farming along with his college studies. He married his girlfriend Pratiksha Shetty in December 2024.

== Career ==
Tanaji Galgunde made his debut in the 2016 film Sairat in a supporting role. Later he played various roles in the films Bhirkit, Maza Agadbam and the film Gast.

He made his TV debut with the Marathi romance drama Man Jhala Bajind. Then he worked in few episodes of comedy TV show The Drama Company.

In 2022, he made his Bollywood debut with the Jhund.

In July 2025, Galgunde launched a YouTube channel titled Bhataktana (Marathi for "While Wandering"), through which he shares videos on rural lifestyle and traditional cuisine, including recipes for regional dishes.

== Filmography ==
=== Films ===
Key
†	Denotes films that have not yet been released

Year	Film	Role	Notes	Ref(s)
2016	Sairat	Pradeep Bansode "Langadya/Balya"	Debut	
2017	Manasu Mallige		Kannada film	
2018	Maza Agadbam	Vajne		
2021	Gast	Amar		
2021	Free Hit Danka	Rangya	Parallel lead role	
2022	Jhund	Saajan	Hindi debut	
2022	Bhirkit	Machya		
2022	Ekdam Kadak	Tilya		
2023	Ghar Banduk Biryani	Vishnu		
2023	Musandi			
2023	International Falamfok			
2024	Navardev Bsc. Agri	Sunny		
2024	Raghu 350	Bandya		
2024	Naad	Banti		
2024	Raja Rani	Pinya		
2025	Khavis	Bichkya		
TBA	13 Leela Villa †	TBA		

=== Television ===
Year	Title	Genre	role	Language	Ref(s)
2017	The Drama Company	Comedy	Different characters	Hindi	
2021	Man Jhala Bajind	Romance	Manoj/Munjya	Marathi	

=== Web series ===
Year	Title	Role	Language
2026	Makta King	Raftaar	Hindi

=== Music video ===
Year	Title	Director	Singer (s)	Language	Ref(s)
2022	"Pirim Ghaval"	Ganesh Krishnadev Vhatkar	Keval Walanj, Sonali Sonawane	Marathi	

== Accolades ==
Year	Award	Category	Nominated work	Result	Ref(s)
2017	Filmfare Marathi Awards	Best Actor in supporting role (Male)	Sairat	Nominated	
