= 13th MFK Awards =

Maharashtra film awards

13th Maharashtracha Favourite Kon? Awards
- Presented on: 20 January 2023
- Hosted by: Amey Wagh, Priyadarshan Jadhav
- Organized by: Zee Talkies

Highlights
- Best Film: Dharmaveer
- Best Direction: Pravin Tarde for Dharmaveer
- Best Actor: Prasad Oak for Dharmaveer
- Best Actress: Amruta Khanvilkar for Chandramukhi
- Most awards: Dharmaveer (5)
- Most nominations: Pandu (12)

Television coverage
- Network: Zee Talkies

The 13th Maharashtracha Favourite Kon? Awards ceremony, presented by the Marathi television channel Zee Talkies, honored the best Marathi-language Indian films of 2022. The ceremony was held on 20 January 2023, and was hosted by Amey Wagh and Priyadarshan Jadhav.

Pandu led the ceremony with 12 nominations, followed by De Dhakka 2 and Timepass 3 with 10 nominations each.

Dharmaveer earned 5 awards, including Favourite Film, Favourite Director, and Favourite Actor, making it the most-awarded film of the ceremony, whereas Chandramukhi earned 3.

Avadhoot Gupte got 3 nominations in Favourite Singer – Male category but lost to Adarsh Shinde. Prasad Oak, Amruta Khanvilkar, and Vaibhav Mangle each received 2 nominations in different categories, with the former two winning Favourite Actor and Favourite Actress, respectively.

== Winners and nominees ==
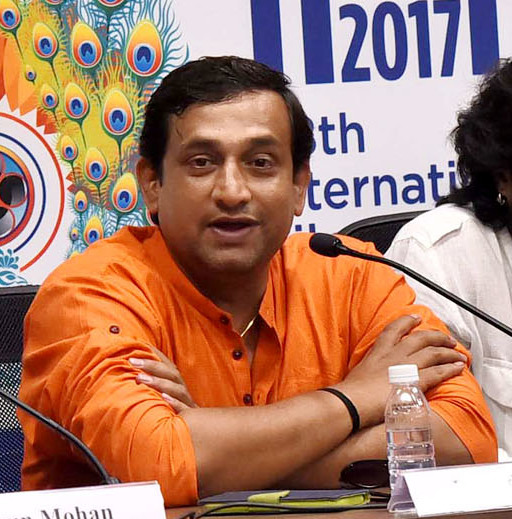
Prasad Oak, Favourite Actor

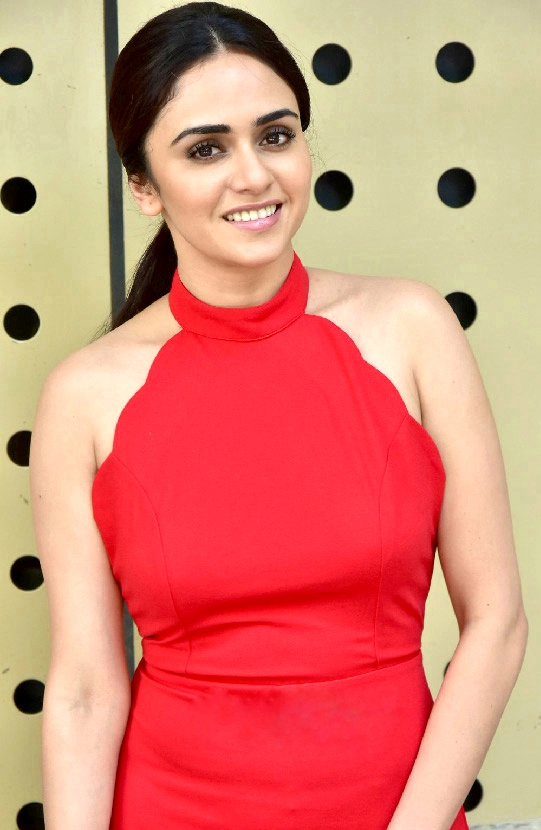
Amruta Khanvilkar, Favourite Actress

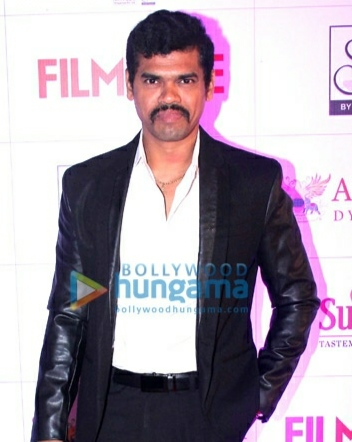
Siddhartha Jadhav, Favourite Supporting Actor

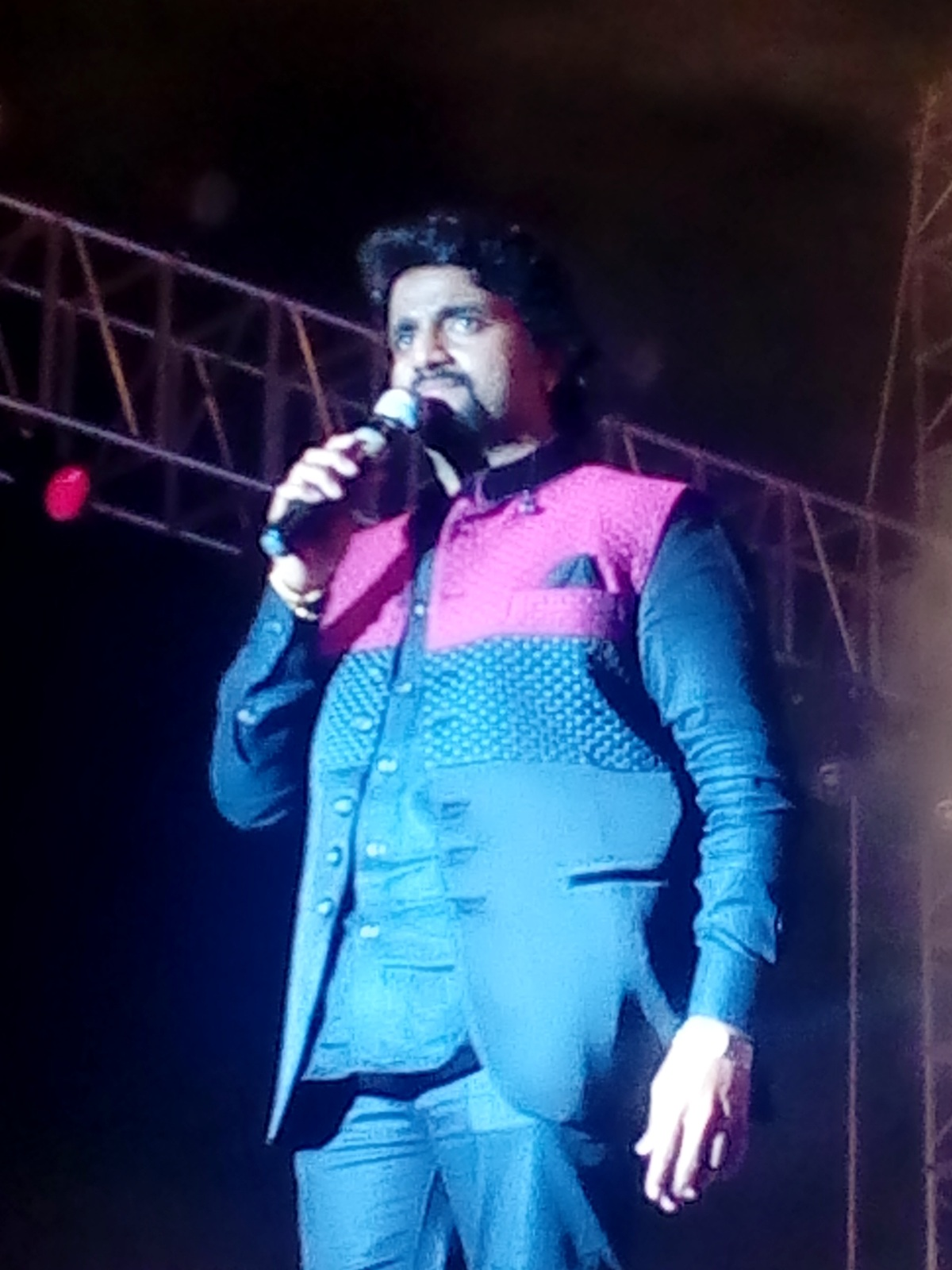
Adarsh Shinde, Favourite Male Singer

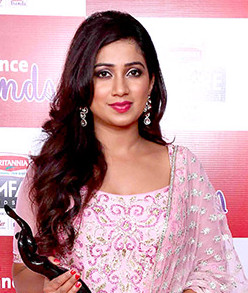
Shreya Ghosal, Favourite Female Singer

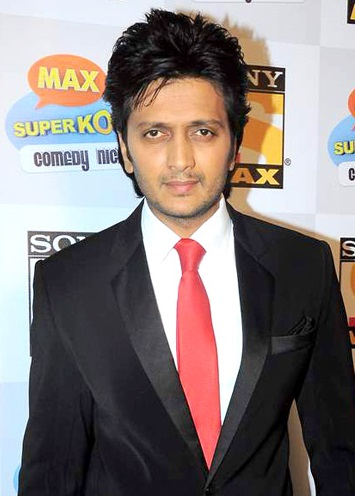
Riteish Deshmukh, Favourite Style Icon

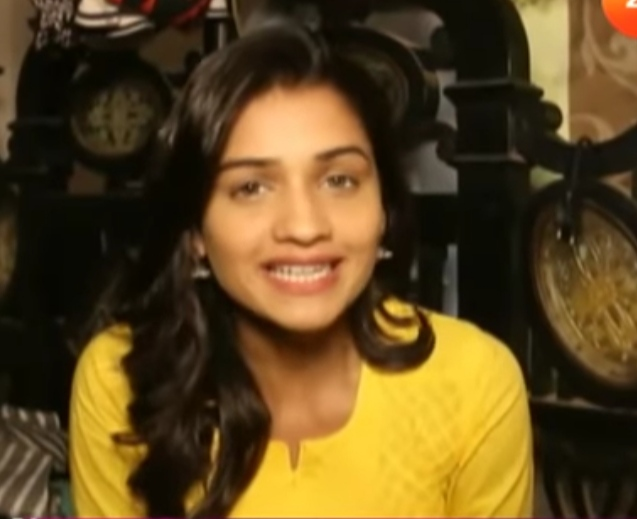
Hruta Durgule, Favourite Popular Face of the Year

| Favourite Film: Dharmaveer; Chandramukhi; De Dhakka 2; Har Har Mahadev; Timepass 3; Pandu; Sher Shivraj; Zombivli | Favourite Director: Pravin Tarde – Dharmaveer; Prasad Oak – Chandramukhi; Viju Mane – Pandu; Abhijit Deshpande – Har Har Mahadev; Mahesh Manjrekar, Sudesh Manjrekar – De Dhakka 2; Digpal Lanjekar – Sher Shivraj; Ravi Jadhav – Timepass 3; Aditya Sarpotdar – Zombivli |
| Favourite Actor: Prasad Oak – Dharmaveer; Adinath Kothare – Chandramukhi; Bhalchandra Kadam – Pandu; Sharad Kelkar – Har Har Mahadev; Makarand Anaspure – De Dhakka 2; Lalit Prabhakar – Zombivli; Amey Wagh – Zombivli; Prathamesh Parab – Timepass 3 | Favourite Actress: Amruta Khanvilkar – Chandramukhi; Sonalee Kulkarni – Pandu; Ritika Shrotri – Darling; Vaidehi Parshurami – Zombivli; Hruta Durgule – Timepass 3 |
| Favourite Supporting Actor: Siddhartha Jadhav – De Dhakka 2; Kshitish Date – Dharmaveer Dharmaveer; Kushal Bhadrike – Pandu; Vaibhav Mangle – Sher Shivraj; Sanjay Narvekar – Timepass 3 | Favourite Supporting Actress: Snehal Tarde – Dharmaveer; Mrunmayee Deshpande – Chandramukhi; Amruta Khanvilkar – Har Har Mahadev; Medha Manjrekar – De Dhakka 2; Mrinal Kulkarni – Sher Shivraj; Trupti Khamkar – Zombivli |
| Favourite Villain: Prajakta Mali – Pandu; Milind Shinde – Har Har Mahadev; Vaibhav Mangle – Timepass 3; Mukesh Rishi – Sher Shivraj; Vidyadhar Joshi – De Dhakka 2 | Favourite Song: "Chandra" – Chandramukhi; "Shivba Raja" – Sher Shivraj; "Gurupurnima" – Dharmaveer; "Sai Tujha Lekaru" – Timepass 3; "De Punha Dhakka" – De Dhakka 2; "Angaat Aalaya" – Zombivli; "Bhurum Bhurum" – Pandu; "Kelewali" – Pandu |
| Favourite Singer – Male: Adarsh Shinde – "Ashtami" – Dharmaveer; Adarsh Shinde – "Sai Tujha Lekaru" – Timepass 3; Avadhoot Gupte – "De Punha Dhakka" – De Dhakka 2; Avadhoot Gandhi – "Shivba Raja" – Sher Shivraj; Avadhoot Gupte – "Kelewali" – Pandu; Rohan Pradhan – "Angaat Aalaya" – Zombivli; Avadhoot Gupte – "Bhurum Bhurum" – Pandu; Manish Rajgire – "Gurupurnima" – Dharmaveer | Favourite Singer – Female: Shreya Ghosal – "Chandra" – Chandramukhi; Vaishali Samant – "Bhurum Bhurum" – Pandu; Shamika Bhide – "De Punha Dhakka" – De Dhakka 2; Sampada Mane – "Kelewali" – Pandu; Shalmali Kholgade – "Cold Drink" – Timepass 3; Vaishali Mhade – "Gar Gar Bhingri" – De Dhakka 2; Vaishali Samant – "Waghachi Darkali" – Timepass 3 |
| Favourite Style Icon: Riteish Deshmukh; Ankush Chaudhari; Swapnil Joshi; Siddharth Jadhav; Lalit Prabhakar; Amey Wagh | Favourite Popular Face of the Year: Hruta Durgule; Amruta Khanvilkar; Sonalee Kulkarni; Pooja Sawant; Sai Tamhankar; Vaidehi Parashurami |
| Special Award – Trend Setter: Ritesh Deshmukh | Favourite Suvarnavati: Sai Tamhankar |

== Superlatives ==
Multiple nominations
| Nominations | Film |
|---|---|
| 12 | Pandu |
| 10 | De Dhakka 2 |
| 10 | Timepass 3 |
| 8 | Dharmaveer |
| 8 | Zombivli |
| 7 | Chandramukhi |
| 7 | Sher Shivraj |
| 5 | Har Har Mahadev |

Multiple wins
| Awards | Film |
|---|---|
| 5 | Dharmaveer |
| 3 | Chandramukhi |

== See also ==
- Maharashtracha Favourite Kon?
