= Chandramukhi (disambiguation) =

Chandramukhi is a 2005 Indian Tamil-language horror comedy film, a remake of the Kannada film Apthamitra (2004).

Chandramukhi may also refer to

- Chandramukhi (character), a fictional character in the 1917 Indian novel Devdas and its adaptations
- Chandramukhi Chautala, a fictional character in the Indian TV series F.I.R.
- Chandramukhi Basu, Indian educationist
- Chandramukhi (2005 soundtrack), for the 2005 film by Vidyasagar
- Chandramukhi (TV series), a 2007 Indian TV series
- Chandramukhi (1960 film), a 1960 Indian Hindi-language film
- Chandra Mukhi, a 1993 Indian Hindi-language fantasy drama
- Bhool Bhulaiyaa, working title Chandramukhi, a 2007 Indian horror comedy film by Priyadarshan, a remake of Manichitrathazhu (1993) which was also remade as Apthamitra
- Chandramukhi (2022 film), an Indian Marathi-language musical romantic drama by Prasad Oak
  - Chandramukhi (2022 soundtrack), its soundtrack by Ajay–Atul

== See also ==
- Chandramukhi 2, a 2023 sequel to the 2005 film
- Chandramukhi 2, working title of the 2010 Indian Telugu-language film Nagavalli, a spin-off to Chandramukhi (2005) and a remake of the 2010 Kannada film Aptharakshaka (which was a sequel to Apthamitra)
- Chandramukhi Devdas, or Vaazhvey Maayam, a 1982 Indian film
- Chandramukhi Pranasakhi, a 1999 Indian film
- Chandramukhavarman, king of Kamarupa in India
