= Ka R Deva =

- Theatrical release poster
- Directed by: Ranjit Dashrath Jadhav
- Written by: Ranjit Dashrath Jadhav
- Produced by: Prasad Shingate
- Starring: Monalisa Bagal; Mayur Lad
- Cinematography: Ansaar Khan
- Edited by: Yash Surve
- Music by: Sandeep Bhure
- Production company: Sahyadri Film Production
- Distributed by: Sunshine Studios
- Release date: 11 February 2022
- Running time: 124 minutes
- Country: India
- Language: Marathi

Ka R Deva is a 2022 Indian Marathi-language romantic drama film directed by Rajit Dasharath Jadhav and produced Sahyadri Film Production, featuring Monalisa Bagal, Mayur Lad, Jaywant Wadkar, Arun Nalawade and Nagesh Bhosale. The film was theatrically released on 11 February 2022.

== Plot ==
Om and Jaanvi fall in love, but because of their different backgrounds, Janhavi's family breaks off their relationship. Now, Om and Jhanvi must overcome the challenge of parental opposition.

== Cast ==
- Monalisa Bagal as Janhavi
- Mayur Lad as Om
- Jaywant Wadkar
- Arun Nalawade
- Nagesh Bhosale as Sampatrao

== Release ==
=== Theatrical ===
Ka R Deva was theatrically released on 11 February 2022.

=== Home media ===
The film is available on Amazon Prime Video and released on 19 January 2023.

== Reception ==
=== Critical reception ===
Preeti Atulkar of The Times of India rated 2.0/5 and reviewed as "The film's story is based on the cliched formula of the rich girl-poor boy romance. Director Ranjit Jadhav has tried to make it a hard hitting tale, but it becomes a failed attempt."

== Music ==
Ka R Deva

Soundtrack album by Sandeep Bhure
- Released: 2022
- Genre: Feature film soundtrack
- Length: 21:48
- Language: Marathi
- Label: Zee Music Company

Official audio
- Ka R Deva - Full Album on YouTube

All music is composed by Sandeep Bhure.

Track listing
| No. | Title | Singer (s) | Length |
|---|---|---|---|
| 1. | "Waju De Dj Dankyat" | Anand Shinde | 3:15 |
| 2. | "Mana Madhe Man Guntla" | Madhur Shinde, Supriya Sorte | 2:32 |
| 3. | "Durava Nako Deau" | Neha Rajpal | 2:37 |
| 4. | "Ka R Deva" | Adarsh Shinde | 3:42 |
| Total length: | | | 21:48 |
