= Fakt Marathi Cine Sanman for Best Playback Singer Male =

Awards for Best Playback Singer Male

- Awarded for: Best Playback Singer Male
- Country: India
- Presented by: Fakt Marathi
- First award: Anand Shinde, "Saat Daudale"; Sarsenapati Hambirrao & Adarsh Shinde, "Astami"; Dharmaveer (2022)
- Currently held by: Adarsh Shinde, "Ek Rambha, Ek Raav"; Ravrambha (2023)

The Fakt Marathi Cine Sanman for Male Playback Singer is given by the Fakt Marathi television network as part of its annual awards for Marathi Cinema. The winners are selected by a jury. The award was first given in 2022.

Here is a list of the award winners and the nominees of the respective years.

== Winner and nominees ==
Year	Photos of winners	Singer	Song	Film	Ref.
2022		Anand Shinde	"Saat Daudale"	Sarsenapati Hambirrao	
2022		Adarsh Shinde	"Astami"	Dharmaveer	
2022		Avadhoot Gandhi, Haridas Shinde	"Yugat Mandli"	Pawankhind	
2022		Rahul Deshpande	"Punav Raticha"	Me Vasantrao	
2022		Rahul Deshpande	"Kaivalya Gaan"	Me Vasantrao	
2023		Adarsh Shinde	"Ek Rambha, Ek Raav"	Ravrambha	
2023		Vishal Dadlani	"Tu Dhagdhgti Aag"	Ananya	
2023		Swapnil Bandodkar	"Tuzya Sobatiche"	Phulrani	
2023		Jayesh Khare	"Gau Nako Kisna"	Maharashtra Shahir	
2023		Shreyas Puranik	"Kojagiri"	Godavari	
2023		Ajay Gogavale	"Ved Tujha"	Ved	
