= Fakt Marathi Cine Sanman for Best Cinematographer =

Awards for best cinematographer

- Awarded for: Best Performance by a Cinematographer
- Country: India
- Presented by: Fakt Marathi
- First award: Sanjay Memane, Chandramukhi (2022)
- Currently held by: Mahesh Limaye, Jaggu Ani Juliet (2023)

The Fakt Marathi Cine Sanman for Best Cinematographer is given by the Fakt Marathi television network as part of its annual awards for Marathi Cinemas. The winners are selected by the jury members. The award was first given in 2022.

Here is a list of the award winners and the nominees of the respective years.

== Winner and nominees ==
Year	Cinematographer	Film	Ref.
2022	Sanjay Memane	Chandramukhi	
2022	Karan B Ravan	Panghrun	
2022	Lawrence Dcunha	Zombivli	
2022	Mahesh Limaye	Sarsenapati Hambirrao	
2022	Rajan Sohani	Bali	
2023	Mahesh Limaye	Jaggu Ani Juliet	
2023	Vasudeo Rane	Maharashtra Shahir	
2023	Vasudeo Rane	Daagadi Chawl 2	
2023	Arjun Sarote	Ananya	
2023	Sanjay Jadhav	Ravrambha	
2023	Vikram Amladi	Ghar Banduk Biryani	
