= Dr. Babasaheb Ambedkar – Mahamanvachi Gauravgatha =

Indian historical & biographical television series

- Genre: Biopic; Historical drama
- Written by: Aparna Padgaonkar; Shilpa Kamble
- Directed by: Ganesh Rasane
- Starring: See below
- Country of origin: India
- Original language: Marathi
- No. of episodes: 343

Production
- Producers: Ninad Vaidya; Nitin Vaidya
- Camera setup: Multi-camera
- Running time: 22 minutes
- Production company: Dashami Creations

Original release
- Network: Star Pravah
- Release: 18 May 2019 – 17 October 2020

Dr. Babasaheb Ambedkar – Mahamanvachi Gauravgatha (Translation: Dr. Babasaheb Ambedkar – Glory Saga of Great Man) is a Marathi television series aired on Star Pravah. The drama is based on life of B. R. Ambedkar was released on 18 May 2019 on the occasion of Buddha Purnima.

== Plot ==
B. R. Ambedkar studying in Columbia University library and is approached by Lala Lajpat Rai to join his home rule league but Ambedkar refuses to do so as he is at the University on the scholarship of his highness Sayajirao Gaekwad III of Baroda State. Ambedkar is unable to afford studying in America so he also works part-time jobs washing plates and cleaning.

He passed his M.A. exam in June 1915, majoring in economics, and other subjects of sociology, history, philosophy and anthropology. He presented a thesis, Ancient Indian Commerce. Ambedkar was influenced by John Dewey and his work on democracy. In 1916 he completed his second thesis, National Dividend of India - A Historic and Analytical Study for another M.A. In October 1916, he enrolled for the Bar course at Gray's Inn, and at the same time enrolled at the London School of Economics where he started working on a doctoral thesis. 1917 The term of his scholarship from Baroda ended, so that he was obliged to go back to India in June with his work unfinished; he was, however, given permission to return and finish within four years. He sent his precious and much-loved collection of books back on a steamer—but it was torpedoed and sunk by a German submarine Ambedkar went to Baroda State to work as a probationer in the Accountant General's Office. A scholarship of 11.50 British pounds a month, for three years, was awarded to the young Ambedkar and per the agreement he has to serve baroda for 10 years after the completion of his studies. However, upon arriving in Baroda, he realized that none of the Hindu hotels would allow his to stay due to his lower caste. He found a Parsi inn, but here, non-Parsis were not allowed to stay. He and the Parsi inn-keeper reached a compromise, where by Ambedkar gave his name as a Parsi, and was allowed to stay.

After joining the new office as a new senior officer (Probationary officer) being an untouchable the peon of the office doesn't give him file in his hand he throw files on his table, Ambedkar feel thirsty and ask for a glass of water, the peon says there is no water when he goes on to drink water from the pot, Upper caste people finds this very uncomfortable and insult him and he is not allowed to drink water from that pot as they think by his touch it will pollute the water so they tell him to bring his own water and call him dirty and untouchable. After a few days of stay in Baroda it is discovered by other Parsis, that he is not Parsi and on the eleventh day of his stay, a group of angry Parsi men, armed with sticks, arrived to remove him from the inn. He had to leave the inn that very day, and not having a place to stay, was forced to leave Baroda and return to Bombay to find work elsewhere.

In Bombay, Ambedkar applies for the post of professorship as professor of political economy in Sydenham College of Commerce and Economics. On the first day of his job the students makes fun of him thinking what this untouchable will teach them does he know how to speak English. In the staff room when Ambedkar approaches towards water pot to drink water a professor named Trivedi doesn't like it and insults him. Ambedkar is approached by Shri Shahu Maharaj of Kolhapur and Ambedkar starts a newspaper called Mooknayak in the year 1920. Ambedkar took a conference in Mangaon in Kolhapur it was attended by Shri Shahu Maharaj. The Maharaj declared in a prophetic vein "You have found your saviour in Ambedkar and I am confident that he will break your shackles".

== Cast ==
- Sagar Deshmukh / Sanjay Jadhav as B. R. Ambedkar
  - Amrut Gaikwad as small Ambedkar
  - Sanket Korlekar as young Ambedkar
- Shivani Rangole as Ramabai Ambedkar; Ambedkar's wife
  - Mrunmayee Supal as Young Ramabai Bhimrao Ambedkar
- Milind Adhikari as Ramji Sakpal; Ambedkar's father
- Aditi Dravid as Tulsa Sakpal; Ambedkar's sister
- Srushti Deshmukh as Manjula Sakpal; Ambedkar’s sister
- Neelam Sawant as Jijabai Sapkal; Ambedkar's step-mother
- Chinmayee Sumeet as Bhimabai Sakpal; Ambedkar's biological mother
- Prathamesh Divate as Anand Sakpal; Ambedkar's brother
- Pooja Nayak as Meerabai Sakpal; Ambedkar's paternal aunt
- Shivani Sonar as Laxmi Sakpal; Anand's wife
- Aditya Beedkar as Balaram Sakpal; Ambedkar's brother
- Rahul Solapurkar as Shahu Maharaj
- Ritesh Tiwari as Nama
- Kiran Mane as Keluskar Guruji
- Bhagyashree Pane as Nama's mother
- Richard Bhakti Klein as Professor Edward Cannan

== Production ==
=== Development ===
The series produced by Dashami Creations, directed by Ganesh Rasane. The first episode was aired on 18 May 2019 on the occasion of Buddha Purnima. The entire biography of Ambedkar from his childhood to Parinirvana has been sketched through the series. His work in various fields such as social, political, economic, educational, journalism, law has been reviewed in the series. It is based on the biographical book "Dr. Bhimrao Ramji Ambedkar" (vol. 1 to 12) of historian Changdev Bhavanrao Khairmode, however more than 800 books in Marathi, Hindi, English, etc. have been collected for this series.

Satish Rajwade, Content Head and Star-Director of Star Pravah, who was instrumental in the decision to make a series on Ambedkar, said, "As a story teller, I personally think that Millions of people from all over the country come to places like Deekshabhoomi in Nagpur. People say that only Babasaheb has the right to our bread, our life, so think about how great the power of that person will be. Even today, if one asks the common man, many people do not know much about Babasaheb beyond the man who wrote Constitution of India. His struggles, the ups and downs of his life, his sacrifices and his work for the country as a whole are so great that it is our concern that his biography should be shared with all. With the same obsession, it's all going on. Babasaheb, let everyone know, this is our sincere wish." The series is popular in Maharashtra and the other parts of India. It was also seen abroad in Europe and United States.

=== Casting ===
Director Satish Rajwade selected Sagar Deshmukh to played young version of B. R. Ambedkar. & kid version played by Amrut Gaikwad. Mrunmayee Supal was selected to play the kid version of Ramabai Ambedkar & Shivani Rangole was cast as the young version of Ramabai Ambedkar.

=== Airing history ===
No.	Airing Date	Days	Time (IST)
1	18 May 2019 – 25 March 2020	Mon-Sat	9 pm
2	13 July – 21 August 2020	Mon-Sat	9 pm
3	22 August – 17 October 2020	Mon-Sat	10.30 pm

== Soundtrack ==
The title song is composed and written by two brothers Adarsh Shinde and Utkarsh Shinde, while the singing is done by Adarsh Shinde. Adarsh and Utkarsh have written the words after much study and reading of this title song. This is the first time the duo has written a title song for a series.
