= Shahu of Kolhapur =

Indian ruler and social reformer (1894 to 1922)

His Highness Rajarshi Shri Shahu Chhatrapati Maharaj
- Chhatrapati; Maharaja; Kshatriya Kulavantas
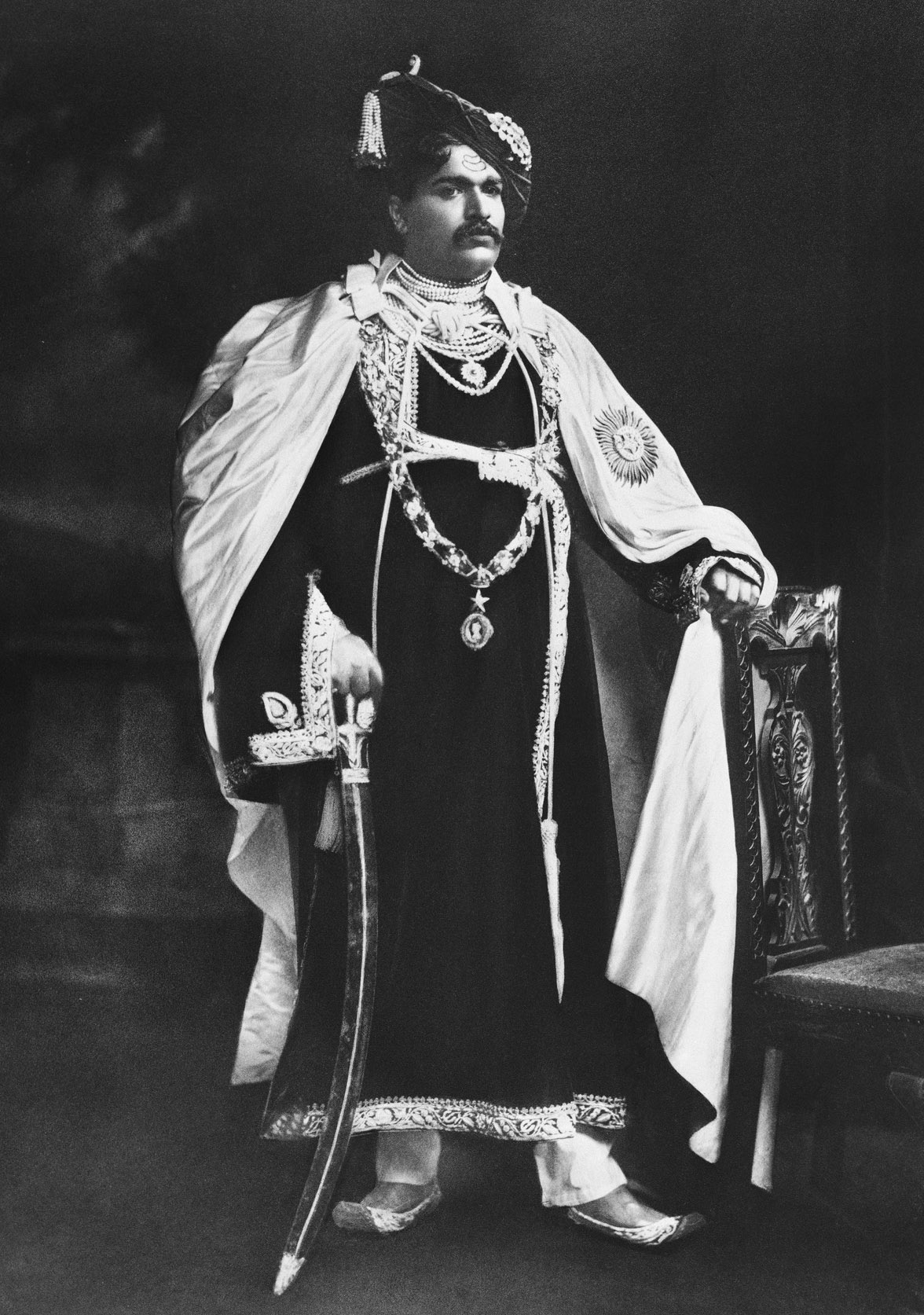
- Shrimant Rajarshi Shri Shahu Chhatrapati Maharaj c. 1912

Maharaja of Kolhapur
- Reign: 2 April 1894 - 6 May 1922
- Predecessor: Shivaji IV of Kolhapur
- Successor: Rajaram II of Kolhapur
- Born: Yashwantrao Ghatge; 26 June 1874; Kagal, Kolhapur State, British India, (Present-day Kagal, Kolhapur district, Maharashtra, India)
- Died: 6 May 1922 (aged 47); Bombay, Bombay Presidency, British India (Now Mumbai)
- Spouse: Rani Laxmibai Chhatrapati
Names
- Yashwantrao Jaisingrao Ghatge
Era name and dates
- British Era: 2 April 1894 - 6 May 1922
Regnal name
- Rajarshi Shahu Chhatrapati Maharaj
- House: Kolhapur
- House: Bhosale
- Dynasty: Maratha
- Father: Jaisingrao (Aabasaheb) Ghatge
- Mother: Radhabai
- Religion: Hinduism

Shahu Maharaj (26 June 1874 – 6 May 1922), also known as Chhatrapati Rajarshi Shahu or Shahu IV, was the ruler of the princely state of Kolhapur in British India from 1894 to 1922. Born Yeshwantrao Ghatge into the Ghatge Maratha family of Kagal, he was adopted by the Kolhapur royal family on 17 March 1884 following the death of the childless Raja Shivaji IV. He received his education at Rajkumar College in Rajkot and was tutored in administrative affairs by Sir Stuart Fraser before ascending to the throne on 2 April 1894.

During his 28-year reign, Shahu Maharaj implemented social and educational reforms aimed at improving conditions for lower-caste communities. His administration issued a reservation order on 26 July 1902 that provided 50% reservation in government jobs and education for backward classes, establishing one of India's earliest affirmative action policies. He established numerous educational institutions including hostels for various caste and religious communities, and made primary education compulsory and free in his state in 1917. In recognition of his educational initiatives, the University of Cambridge conferred upon him an honorary Doctor of Laws degree on 10 June 1903.

Shahu maharaja's government enacted several pieces of social legislation addressing caste and gender discrimination. These included laws permitting widow remarriage (1 January 1917), legalizing inter-caste and inter-religious marriages (12 July 1919), and prohibiting the Devadasi system (11 November 1920). He pursued economic development through the establishment of cooperative societies, textile mills including the Shahu Chhatrapati Spinning and Weaving Mill (1906), and agricultural institutions. A major infrastructure project undertaken during his reign was the Radhanagari Dam on the Bhogawati River, initiated in 1907 and completed posthumously in 1935, which enabled irrigation of approximately 15,000 hectares of land. He maintained an association with B. R. Ambedkar between 1917 and 1921, providing financial support for Ambedkar's newspaper Mooknayak and collaborating on issues of caste discrimination. A patron of traditional wrestling, Shahu established numerous training facilities throughout Kolhapur and built Khasbag Stadium.

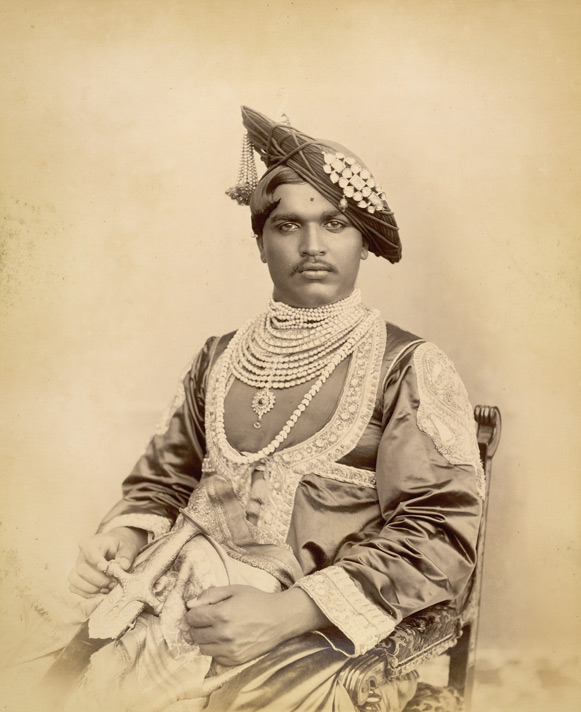
Maharaja of Kolhapur in 1894

== Early life ==
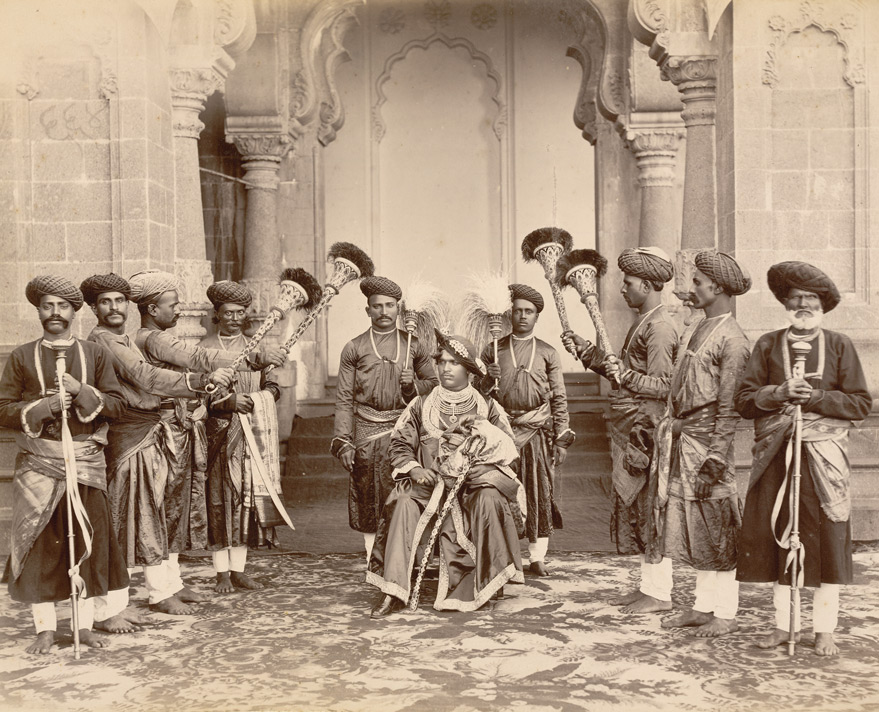
H.H. Shahu Maharaj seated with palace servants

He was born as Yeshwantrao in the Ghatge Maratha family, of Kagal (Sr.) jagir in the Kolhapur district as Yeshwantrao Ghatge to Jaisingrao (Aabasaheb) and Radhabai on 26 June 1874. Jaisingrao Ghatge was the Chief of the Kagal (Sr.) estate and the regent of Kolhapur State, while his mother Radhabai hailed from the royal Ghorpade family of Mudhol. Young Yeshwantrao lost his mother when he was only three. His education was supervised by his father till he was 10 years old. In that year, he was adopted by Maharani Saheb Anandibai Chhatrapati, widow of King Shivaji VI Chhatrapati Maharaj, of the princely state of Kolhapur. He completed his formal education at the Rajkumar College, Rajkot and took lessons of administrative affairs from Sir Stuart Fraser, a representative of the Indian Civil Services. He ascended the throne in 1894 after coming of age, prior to which a regency council appointed by the British Government took care of the state affairs. During his accession Yeshwantrao was renamed as Shahuji Maharaj. Shahu was over six feet five inches in height and displayed a regal and majestic appearance. Wrestling was one of his favourite sports and he patronised the sport throughout his rule. Wrestlers from all over the country would come to his state to participate in wrestling competitions.

He was married to Lakshmibai Khanvilkar ( Maharani Saheb Shrimant Laxmibai Chhatrapati ) urf (Aaisaheb Maharaj ), daughter of a nobleman from Baroda in 1891. The couple had four children, two sons and two daughters.

== Vedokta controversy ==
A Brahmin priest Narayan Bhat of the royal family refused to perform the particular Vedokta rites for Shahu maharaja's implying that he belonged to Shudra varna later claiming that there were no real Kshatriyas and that in the present Kali Yuga or epoch of Kali, only two varnas existed, Brahmins and Shudras which led to Shahu Maharaj to fight for the rights of the Maratha community. Shahu Maharaj revitalised the Patgaon tradition, a monastic lineage founded in the 17th century by Mouni Maharaj, a Maratha yogi. As part of this revival, he appointed Sadashivrao Lakshmanrao Sankpal Patil Benadikar, a Maratha and noted Sanskrit scholar, as the Kshatra-Jagadguru.

== Social reform ==
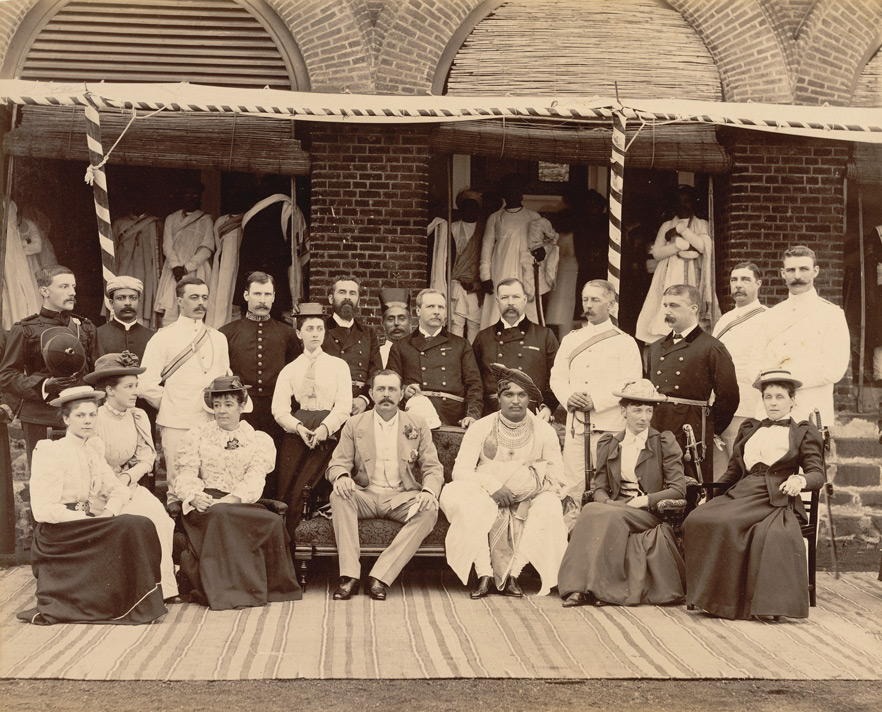
The 19-year-old Shahu Maharaj with the then British resident for Kolhapur state and the latter's staff in 1894

Shahu Chhatrapati Maharaj occupied the throne of Kolhapur for 28 years, from 1894 to 1922; during this period he initiated numerous social reforms in his empire. He is credited with doing much to improve conditions for the lower castes. He also ensured suitable employment for students thus educated, thereby creating one of the earliest affirmative action (50% reservation to weaker sections) programs in history. Many of these measures came in to effect in the year 1902. He started Shahu Chhatrapati Weaving and Spinning Mill in 1906 to provide employment. Rajaram College was built by Shahu Maharaj, and later was named after him. His emphasis was on education, his aim being to make learning available to the masses. He introduced a number of educational programs to promote education among his subjects. He established hostels for different ethnicities and religions, including Panchals, Devadnya, Sonars, Shimpi, Dhor-Chambhar communities as well as for Muslims, Jains and Christians. He established the Miss Clarke Boarding School for the socially quarantined segments of the community. Shahu introduced several scholarships for poor meritorious students from backward castes. He also initiated compulsory free primary education for all in his state. He established Vedic Schools which enabled students from all castes and classes to learn the scriptures, thus propagating Sanskrit education among all. He also founded special schools for village heads or 'patils' to make them better administrators.

On 10 June 1903, in recognition of his work in educational and cultural fields, the University of Cambridge conferred upon him the honorary degree of Doctor of Laws (LL.D.)

Shahu Chhatrapati Maharaj was a strong advocate of equality among all strata of society. He appointed a young Maratha scholar in the post and bestowed him the title of Kshatra Jagadguru (the world teacher of the Kshatriyas). This incident together with Shahu's encouragement of the non-Brahmins to read and recite the Vedas led to the Vedokta controversy in Maharashtra. He established the Deccan Rayat Association in Nipani during 1916. The association sought to secure political rights for non-Brahmins and invite their equal participation in politics.

Shahu Maharaj pioneered progressive legislation to reform oppressive social customs affecting women and marginalized communities. On 1 January 1917, he legally sanctioned widow remarriage in Kolhapur State, becoming one of the first Indian rulers to institutionalize this reform through law. This groundbreaking act allowed Hindu widows, who traditionally faced lifelong social ostracism and restrictions, to remarry with full legal recognition and protection. Building on this momentum, on 12 July 1919, Shahu Maharaj enacted the Inter-caste and Inter-religion Marriage Act, which legalized marriages between different castes and religions within his state. This legislation directly challenged the rigid caste hierarchy that had dominated Indian society for centuries, providing legal sanction and state protection to couples who chose to marry outside their caste or religious community. These acts were revolutionary for their time and demonstrated Shahu maharaja's commitment to dismantling social barriers through legislative reform.

On 11 November 1920, Shahu Maharaj introduced the Rights of Illegitimate Hindu Children and Jogtini Act, commonly known as the Jogtini Act or Devadasi Prohibition Act. This landmark legislation banned the Devadasi system, a religious practice wherein young girls, often from lower-caste families, were ceremonially "married" to deities and dedicated to temple service. While presented as a religious tradition, the practice frequently led to sexual exploitation of these girls and women by temple priests, effectively turning them into a hereditary class of temple prostitutes. Shahu's act not only prohibited the dedication of girls as Devadasis but also granted legal rights and inheritance protections to children born to Devadasis, who had previously been denied social legitimacy. This legislation made Kolhapur one of the first Indian princely states to outlaw this exploitative practice, predating similar legislation in British India and other princely states by several years. The act reflected Shahu maharaja's determination to use state power to protect vulnerable women and children from religiously sanctioned exploitation.

== Economic and agricultural development ==
Shahu Maharaj introduced a number of progressive economic projects designed to enable his subjects to achieve self-sufficiency in their chosen professions and reduce exploitation by predatory middlemen. On 8 March 1906, he laid the foundation stone for the Shahu Chhatrapati Maharaj Spinning and Weaving Mill, which was officially inaugurated on 27 September 1906. This textile mill provided employment opportunities to thousands of workers and made quality cloth available to common citizens at affordable prices. The mill was initially established as a joint venture with Gujarati merchants, but recognizing its strategic importance, Shahu nationalized it in 1918 to ensure its sustainability and protect workers' interests. To support agricultural livelihoods, he established dedicated marketplaces and co-operative societies for farmers, freeing them from exploitative middlemen in trading. The Kolhapur Urban Co-operative Society, founded on 30 September 1913, was among the first such initiatives in princely India.

Recognizing that agricultural modernization was essential for economic development, Shahu Maharaj made credit facilities available to farmers seeking to purchase modern equipment and adopt improved cultivation techniques. To provide systematic agricultural education, he established the King Edward Agricultural Institute in 1912–13, which trained farmers in scientific methods to increase crop yields and productivity. Perhaps his most ambitious infrastructural project was the Radhanagari Dam on the Bhogawati River. He initiated the project on 18 February 1907, and the foundation stone was laid in 1909. The dam was completed in 1935, and since 1938 has been operating at full capacity for both irrigation and hydroelectric power generation. This visionary project transformed Kolhapur's agricultural landscape, enabling year-round irrigation of approximately 15,000 hectares of land and making the region self-sufficient in water resources. The dam's construction demonstrated Shahu maharaja's foresight in addressing the long-term developmental needs of his subjects, particularly the farming community that formed the backbone of Kolhapur's economy.

His seminal contribution in social, political, educational, agricultural and cultural spheres earned him the title of Rajarshi, which was bestowed upon him by the Kurmi community of Kanpur.

== Patronage of arts, culture, and sports ==
Shahu Maharaj was a transformative patron of arts, culture, and sports, whose support transformed Kolhapur's cultural landscape. He championed classical music and performing arts, providing crucial backing to institutions like the Karveer Gayan Samaj (established 1883) and Deval Club (established 1893). His patronage attracted renowned artists from across India and made classical arts accessible to common citizens, establishing Kolhapur as a major center for Hindustani classical music.

Wrestling held a special place in Shahu maharaja's heart. An accomplished wrestler himself, he viewed kushti (traditional Indian wrestling) as essential for building physical fitness, discipline, and social equality among youth. He built hundreds of taleems (wrestling training centers) throughout Kolhapur during his reign. Many of these, including the Gangavesh Taleem, Shahupuri Taleem, and Motibag Taleem, remain active today.

Shahu maharaja's most ambitious project was Khasbag Stadium, completed around 1912. Inspired by the Roman Colosseum he had seen during his 1902 European tour, this massive wrestling arena features a sunken central pit surrounded by seating for over 60,000 spectators. The ingenious design provides unobstructed views from every angle, making it India's largest and most iconic wrestling venue. Shahu Maharaj organized regular tournaments with substantial prizes, inviting legendary wrestlers from across undivided India to compete. This royal support made Kolhapur India's wrestling capital, a reputation the city proudly maintains today.

Beyond arts and athletics, Shahu Maharaj supported writers, scholars, and researchers while establishing gymnasiums and sports facilities to promote health consciousness. His vision was clear: true social progress required not only educational reform and social justice but also cultural enrichment and physical vitality.

== Association with Dr. Babasaheb Ambedkar (1917-1921) ==
Dr. B.R. Ambedkar met Shahu Maharaj with the help of artists Dattoba Pawar and Dittoba Dalvi. The Maharaja was greatly impressed by the intellect of young Ambedkar and his ideas regarding untouchability. The two met a number of times during 1917–1921 and went over possible ways to abolish the negatives of caste segregation by providing "caste-based reservation" to selected people. They organised a conference for the betterment of the untouchables during 21–22 March 1920 and the Shahu Maharaj made Ambedkar the Chairman as he believed that Ambedkar was the leader who would work for the amelioration of the segregated segments of the society. He even donated Rs. 2,500 to Ambedkar, when the latter started his newspaper 'Mooknayak' on 31 January 1921, and contributed more later for the same cause. Their association lasted till the Shahu Maharaj's death in 1922.

== Personal life ==
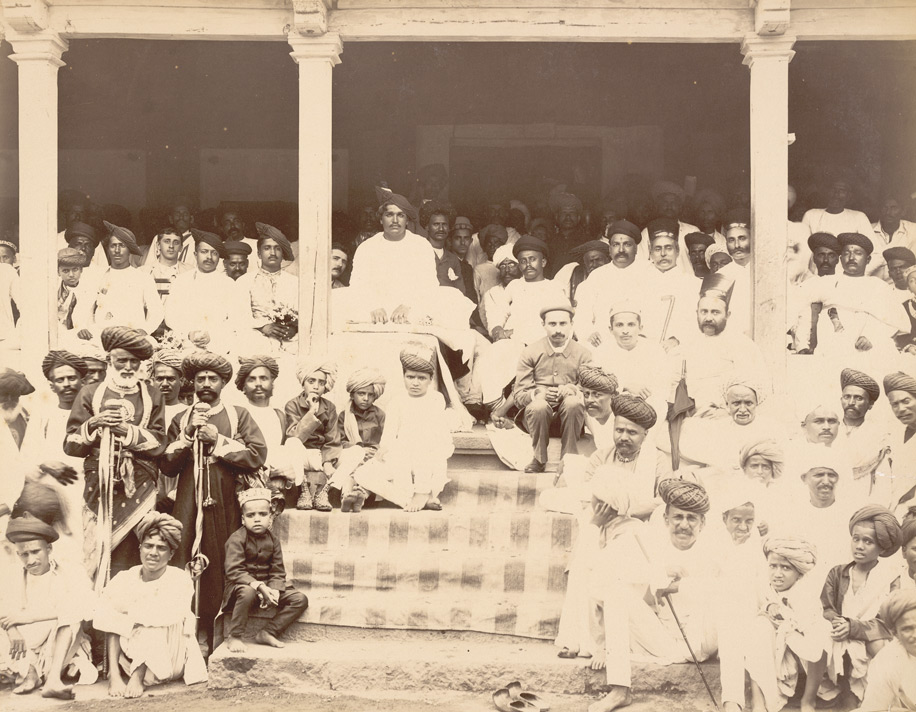
H.H.Shahu Chhatrapati Maharaj sitting amongst crowds watching wrestling match.

In 1891, Shahu Maharaj married Lakshmibai Khanvilkar and renamed Maharani Saheb Laxmibai Chhatrapati (Aaisaheb Maharaj) (1880–1945), daughter of a Maratha nobleman from Baroda. They were the parents of four children:

- Rajaram III, who succeeded his father as Maharaja of Kolhapur.
- Radhabai 'Akkasaheb' Pawar, Maharani of Dewas (1894–1973) who married Raja Tukojirao III of Dewas and had issue:
  - Vikramsinhrao Pawar, who became Maharaja of Dewas in 1937 and who later succeeded to the throne of Kolhapur as Chhatrapati Shahaji II Maharaj.
- Sriman Maharajkumar Shivaji (1899–1918)
- Shrimati Rajkumari Aubai (1895)

== Death ==
Rajarshi Shri Shahu Chhatrapati Maharaj died on 6 May 1922 in Girgaon, Bombay (Now Mumbai). He was succeeded by his eldest son, Rajaram III as the Maharaja of Kolhapur. The reforms initiated by Shri Shahu Chhatrapati Maharaj gradually began to fade for the lack of able leadership to carry on the legacy.

== Full name and titles ==
His full official name was: Colonel His Highness Kshatriya-Kulaawatans Sinhasanaadheeshwar, Shreemant Rajarshi Sir Shahu Chhatrapati Maharaj Sahib Bahadur, GCSI, GCIE, GCVO.

During his life he acquired the following titles and honorific names:

- 1874–1884: Meherban Shrimant Yeshwantrao Sarjerao Ghatge
- 1884–1895: His Highness Kshatriya-Kulaawatans Sinhasanaadheeshwar, Shreemant Rajarshi Shahu Chhatrapati Maharaj Sahib Bahadur, Raja of Kolhapur
- 1895–1900: His Highness Kshatriya-Kulaawatans Sinhasanaadheeshwar, Shreemant Rajarshi Sir Shahu Chhatrapati Maharaj Sahib Bahadur, Raja of Kolhapur, GCSI
- 1900–1903: His Highness Kshatriya-Kulaawatans Sinhasanaadheeshwar, Shreemant Rajarshi Sir Shahu Chhatrapati Maharaj Sahib Bahadur, Maharaja of Kolhapur, GCSI
- 1903–1911: His Highness Kshatriya-Kulaawatans Sinhasanaadheeshwar, Shreemant Rajarshi Sir Shahu Chhatrapati Maharaj Sahib Bahadur, Maharaja of Kolhapur, GCSI, GCVO
- 1911–1915: His Highness Kshatriya-Kulaawatans Sinhasanaadheeshwar, Shreemant Rajarshi Sir Shahu Chhatrapati Maharaj Sahib Bahadur, Maharaja of Kolhapur, GCSI, GCIE, GCVO
- 1915–1922: Colonel His Highness Kshatriya-Kulaawatans Sinhasanaadheeshwar, Shreemant Rajarshi Sir Shahu Chhatrapati Maharaj Sahib Bahadur, Maharaja of Kolhapur, GCSI, GCIE, GCVO

== Honours ==
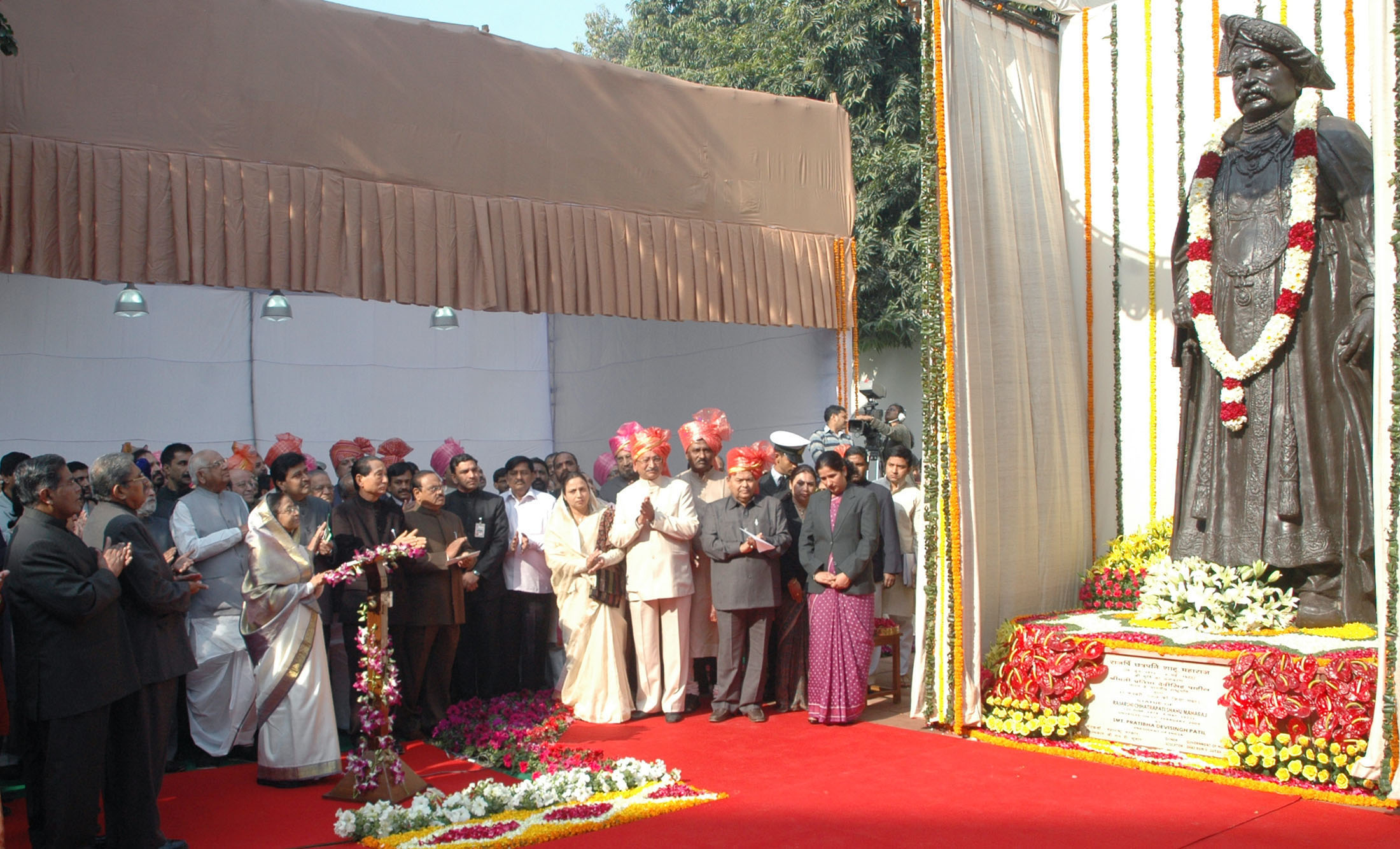
President, Smt. Pratibha Devisingh Patil unveiling the statue of Rajarshi Chhatrapati Shahu Maharaj, at Parliament House, in New Delhi on 17 February 2009.

- Knight Grand Commander of the Order of the Star of India (GCSI), 1895
- King Edward VII Coronation Medal, 1902
- Knight Grand Cross of the Royal Victorian Order (GCVO), 1903
- Hon. LLD (Cantabrigian), 1903
- Delhi Durbar Gold Medal, 1903
- King George V Coronation Medal, 1911
- Knight Grand Commander of the Order of the Indian Empire (GCIE), 1911
- Delhi Durbar Gold Medal, 1911

=== Memorials ===
- An eight-foot tall statue of Shahu Chhatrapati Maharaj was installed at the Parliament House, in New Delhi. Then the President, Pratibha Patil unveiled the statue on 17 February 2009.
- President of India unveiled the statue of Shahu Maharaj in Pune on 28 December 2013

== Legacy ==
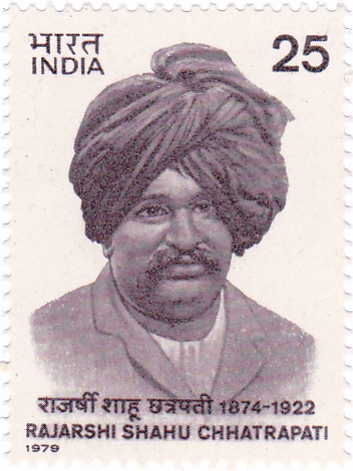
Shahu of Kolhapur 1979 stamp of India

- In 1995, under the Uttar Pradesh Chief Minister Mayawati, Kanpur University was renamed to Chhatrapati Shahu Ji Maharaj University.
- In 2006 Government of Maharashtra announced Shahu Maharaj's birthday as Samajik Nyay Din (lit. 'Social Justice Day').
- Textbook lessons based on Shahu, Balbharti included in its Marathi language books for some Marathi school's classes. An incident in which Shahu Maharaj granted farm to a poor farmer couple was included in class fourth's Marathi school textbook's lesson in 2009.

=== In media ===
Shahu IV was portrayed in Star Pravah's Dr. Babasaheb Ambedkar – Mahamanvachi Gauravgatha serial. It was about B. R. Ambedkar and run on Star Pravah in 2019.

== See also ==
- Bhosale Family
- Reservation in India
- Dalit

Shahu of Kolhapur Bhosale Dynasty (Kolhapur line) Born: 26 July 1874 Died: 6 May 1922
Regnal titles
Preceded by Himself (as Raja of Kolhapur)	Maharaja of Kolhapur; 1900–1922	Succeeded by Rajaram III
Preceded by Shivaji VI (as Raja of Kolhapur)	Raja of Kolhapur; 1884–1900	Succeeded by Himself (as Maharaja of Kolhapur)
