= Total Hublak =

Marathi-language comedy series

- Genre: Comedy
- Starring: See below
- Country of origin: India
- Original language: Marathi
- No. of episodes: 24

Production
- Producer: Tejpal Wagh
- Production locations: Satara, Maharashtra, India
- Camera setup: Multi-camera
- Running time: 22 minutes
- Production company: Waghoba Production

Original release
- Network: Zee Marathi
- Release: 15 June – 11 July 2020

Total Hublak is an Indian Marathi language comedy series aired on Zee Marathi from 15 June 2020 during lockdown period. It starred Kiran Gaikwad and Monalisa Bagal in lead roles. It is produced by Tejpal Wagh under the banner of Waghoba Production.

== Cast ==
- Kiran Gaikwad
- Monalisa Bagal
- Rahul Magdum
- Purva Shinde
- Amarnath Kharade
- Sachin Hagavane-Patil
- Nilima Kamane
- Mahesh Jadhav
- Kiran Mane
