= Balkrishna Shinde =

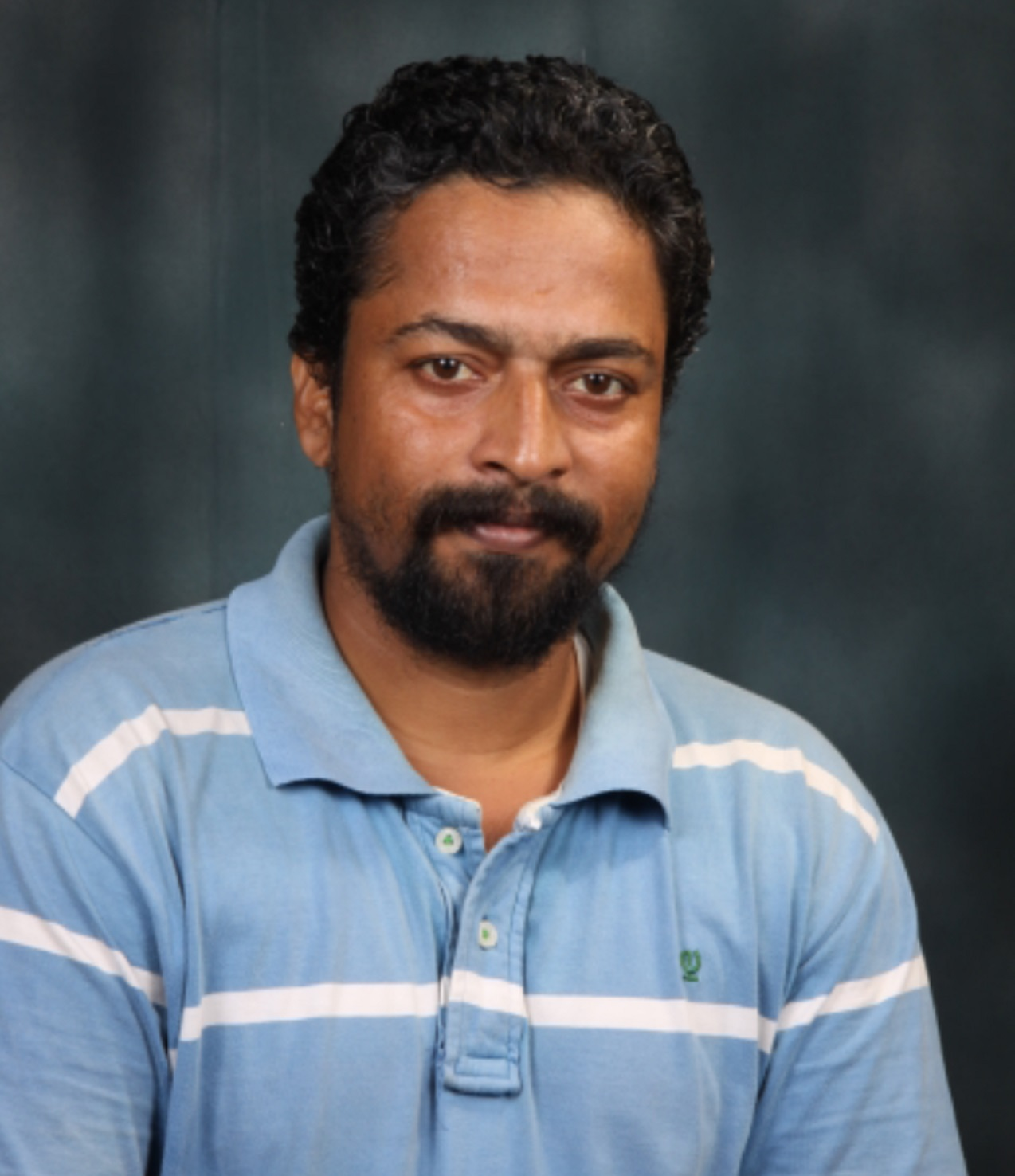
- Born: 14 July 1970 (age 56); Satara, Maharashtra, India
- Occupation: Actor
- Years active: 2000–present
- Spouse: Shobha Shinde
- Children: Rutuja & Mrunal
- Parent(s): Bajarang Shinde & Kantabai Shinde

Balkrishna Shinde is an Indian film actor and director. He is best known for his work in Marathi cinema. He came to limelight in Rajiv Patil's film Savarkhed Ek Gaon for his role as Baban.

== Education ==
Balkrishna Shinde did his schooling at Anant English School, Satara. Later, he completed his B.Com from Lal Bahadur Shastri College, Satara. He also has his bachelor's and master's in journalism and holds a diploma in software management from Aptech.

== Career ==
Balkrishna Shinde has appeared in both TV serials and films, though he is best known for his role as Patangrao Nangare Patil in Star Pravahas's Premacha Game Same To Same, which was produced by Sobo Films. His 2005 film, Dombivali Fast, received the Marathi Cinema Award at the 4th PIFF, 2006.

== Filmography ==
Year	Title	Language	Role	Notes
2001	EK Hoti Wadi	Marathi	Shankar lohar (Dholya)	as a villain
2004	Savarkhed Ek Gaav	Marathi	Baban	as a supporting actor
2005	Dombivli Fast	Marathi	guest appearance	guest appearance
2006	Supari	Marathi	Walya	as a protagonist
2008	Dhudgus	Marathi	Sambha	as a supporting actor
2009	Thanks Maa	Hindi	Tatya langada	as a special villain
2012	Jaagran	Marathi	Pahelwan	as a supporting actor
2015	Police Line	Marathi	Aanaji	as a supporting actor
2015	Mungla	Marathi	Item Boy	-
2016	Ganvesh	Marathi	Hawaldar Shinde	as a supporting actor
2017	Zala Bobhata	Marathi	Balu	as a supporting actor
Upcoming	Bhikit	Marathi	Bhagya	as a supporting actor
Upcoming	Habbadi	Marathi	ventriloquist	as a supporting actor
Upcoming	Jagran	Marathi	Pehelwan	as a supporting actor

=== Television ===
Title	Role	Notes
Julta Julta Jultay Ki	Shankar Shet	Sony Marathi
Premacha Game Same To Same	Patangrao Nangare Patil	Star Pravah
Tujhyat Jeev Rangala	ACP Mohite	Zee Marathi

=== Direction ===
Film	Release year
Punha Gondhal Punha Mujra	2014

== Books written (Drama) ==
Book Title	Category	Notes
Amavasecha Chandra aani itar ekankika	One act play book	Maharashtra state Mama varerkar best one act play book award 2010
Teen Phulya Teen badam	Two act play	
