= Monalisa Bagal =

Indian film actress

- Born: Monalisa Bagal; 10 February 1996 (age 30); Lonavala, Maharashtra, India
- Occupation: Actress
- Years active: 2014–present

Monalisa Bagal (born 10 February 1996) is an Indian actress who works predominantly in Marathi cinema. She made her acting debut with the film Sau Shashi Deodhar (2014), directed by Sandeep Bhalachandra Kulkarni. Bagal gained wider recognition with her role in Zala Bobhata (2017), where her performance was critically appreciated.

Over the years, she has appeared in several Marathi films, including Prem Sankat (2016), Dry Day (2018), Sobat (2018), and Bhirkit (2022). Known for her expressive performances and versatility, Bagal has established herself as a rising talent in the Marathi film industry. In addition to her work in cinema, she has also appeared in television shows and short films. Her career continues to expand with upcoming projects across various genres.

As of 2025, Monalisa Bagal's public relations and digital presence are managed by Zielotech Software Private Limited.

== Career ==
Monalisa Bagal begun career with the Sai Tamhankar starrer film Sau Shashi Deodhar and marked best role in Zala Bobhata. She also appeared in Prem Sankat, Dry Day, Sobat, Perfume and Bhirkit. In 2023, she is playing lead role in Anup Jagdale's period drama film Ravrambha.

== Filmography ==
All movies are in Marathi, unless mentioned.

=== Films ===
Key
†	Denotes films that have not yet been released

Year	Film	Role
2014	Sau Shashi Deodhar	
2016	Prem Sankat	
2017	Zala Bobhata	Priya
2017	Dry Day	
2018	Sobat	Gauri
2019	Perfume	
2021	Gast	Sujata
2021	Current	
2022	Ka R Deva	Janhavi
2023	Ravrambha	Rambha
2025	Ambat Shaukin	
TBA	Kakul †	TBA

=== Television ===
Year	Show	Role	Ref.
2020	Total Hublak	Bhagyashree	
2020-2021	Chala Hawa Yeu Dya Ladies Zindabad	Contestant	
