= Jaanata Raja =

- Official song cover

Song by Adarsh Shinde, Aaboli Girhe

from the album Pandu
- Language: Marathi
- Released: 11 November 2021
- Studio: Audio Art, Thane
- Genre: Soundtrack
- Length: 2:50
- Label: Zee Music Company
- Composer: Avadhoot Gupte
- Lyricist: Sameer Samant
- Producer: Zee Studios

Pandu track listing
- 1. "Bhurum Bhurum"; 2. "Kelewadi"; 3. "Dada Parat Ya Na"; 4. "Badluck Kharab Hay"; 5. "Jaanata Raja"

Music video
- Jaanata Raja on YouTube

"Jaanata Raja" (transl. Enlightened king) is a 2021 Indian Marathi-language song by Adarsh Shinde, and Aaboli Girhe. It is composed by Avadhoot Gupte and written by Sameer Samant for the soundtrack album of the comedy drama film Pandu, features Bhau Kadam, Kushal Badrike, Pravin Tarde, Prajakta Mali, and Sonalee Kulkarni.

== Background and release ==
The song tells the story of Shivaji's significance, Pravin Tarde portrays a political figure who holds Chhatrapati Shivaji Maharaj in high regard.

"Jaanata Raja" was released on 11 November 2021 on all digital audio platforms.

== Credits ==
Credits adapted from YouTube.

- Singers – Adarsh Shinde and Aaboli Girhe
- Music – Avadhoot Gupte
  - Assistant Music Composer – Nitin Dhole
- Lyricist – Sameer Samant
- Arrangers/Programmers – Kamalesh Bhadkamkar
- Live Rhythm – Prabhakar Mosamkar /Aadesh More /Manish Thumbare
- Trumpet – Walter Dias
- Chorus – Vivek Naik & Group
- Recording Studio – Audio Art, Thane
  - Recorded by Ganesh Pokale
- Mixed And Mastered By Vijay Dayal
- Choreographers – Ganesh Raut & Saurabh Shelar

== Accolades ==
Year	Award	Category	Recipient (s) and Nominee (s)	Result	Ref.
2021	Filmfare Awards Marathi	Best Male Playback Singer	Adarsh Shinde	Nominated	
2022–2023	Radio City Cine Awards	Best Music Director	Avadhoot Gupte	Nominated	
2022–2023	Radio City Cine Awards	Best Singer Male	Adarsh Shinde	Won	
2022–2023	Radio City Cine Awards	Best Lyricist	Sameer Samant	Nominated	
