= Chandramukhi (2022 soundtrack) =

Soundtrack album by Ajay–Atul
- Released: 28 April 2022
- Recorded: 2020–2021
- Genre: Feature film soundtrack
- Length: 30:05
- Language: Marathi
- Label: Everest Entertainment
- Producer: Ajay–Atul

Ajay–Atul chronology
Jhund (2022)	Chandramukhi (2022)	Ram Setu (2022)
External audio
- Official Audio Jukebox on YouTube

Singles from Chandramukhi
- 1. "Chandra" Released: 30 March 2022; 2. "To Chand Rati" Released: 8 April 2022; 3. "Bai Ga" Released: 14 April 2022; 4. "Sawaal Jawaab" Released: 24 April 2022

Chandramukhi is the soundtrack to the 2022 Marathi film of the same name directed by Prasad Oak starring Amruta Khanvilkar in the titular role alongside Adinath Kothare and Mrunmayee Deshpande. The film's musical score and six-song soundtrack is composed by Ajay–Atul with lyrics written by Guru Thakur. With four songs preceded the album, the soundtrack to the film released on 28 April 2022 through Everest Entertainment, to positive response from critics and audience and received numerous accolades. The songs "Chandra" and "Bai Ga" were chartbusters.

== Development ==
Chandramukhi marks Ajay–Atul's return to Marathi cinema after four years, since their previous release Mauli (2018). Khanvilkar said that she had been a fan of the duo's work and has felt "a strong emotional connection with them as I have worked with them earlier. (Note: Khanvilkar earlied starred in Natarang (2010) which was composed by Ajay–Atul.) They have always been around to bless me on every important milestone of my life". The COVID-19 pandemic halted the film's production process, which led that the duo had more time to work on sketching the compositions and tunes.

The songs were recorded during December 2020–February 2021, with Priyanka Barve, Aarya Ambekar and Shreya Ghoshal recording their vocals for the songs in this period. The title track "Chandra" was recorded within three days, while Ghoshal recorded her vocals in a single day. The duo composed threelavani numbers based on Chandramukhi's character.

== Marketing and release ==
The first song from the film—the title track "Chandra"—was released as a music video on 29 March 2022, followed by an official single that released a day later. Prior to the release, Khanvilkar performed the song at an event held at the Royal Opera House to launch her 35-foot tall cut out in Chandra's look. It was subsequently followed by the singles: "Tu Chand Rati", "Bai Ga" and "Sawaal Jawaab" released on 8, 14 and 24 April 2022, respectively. The music generated much anticipation among audiences. Khanvilkar and Kothare performed musical numbers while promoting the film at the Chhatrapati Shivaji Maharaj International Airport for advertising the posters on the SpiceJet plane and in the Pune Metro train. The album featuring six-songs were released by Everest Entertainment on 28 April 2022.

== Track listing ==
All lyrics are written by Guru Thakur; all music is composed by Ajay–Atul.

No.	Title	Singer(s)	Length
1.	"Chandra"	Shreya Ghoshal	05:15
2.	"Bai Ga"	Aarya Ambekar	06:10
3.	"To Chand Rati"	Shreya Ghoshal	03:28
4.	"Sawaal Jawaab"	Priyanka Barve, Madhura Datar, Vishwajeet Borvankar	07:40
5.	"Chirabharni"	Chorus	03:26
6.	"Kanha"	Ajay Gogavale	04:03
Total length:			30:05

== Reception ==
Shubham Kulkarni of Koimoi stated that "Ajay–Atul create an album that is rooted in the story and folk and doesn’t really follow their USP structure". Critic-based at Pune Mirror called Ajay–Atul's music as "the hero in the film" and the songs "catchy". Mihir Bhanage of The Times of India said that Ajay–Atul's music "adds the required rustic touch to the songs and elevates the experience". the songs are "a tribute to Maharashtra's folk culture". The Week's review praised the soundtrack as "amazing". Outlook India called the album as a "mesmermising, enthralling and immersive experience".

== Accolades ==
Award	Date of ceremony (Note: Each date is linked to the article about the awards held that year, wherever possible.)	Category	Recipient(s)	Result	Ref.
Fakt Marathi Cine Sanman	27 July 2022	Best Lyricist	Guru Thakur and Ajay–Atul (for song "Bai Ga")	Nominated	
Fakt Marathi Cine Sanman	27 July 2022	Best Playback Singer – Female	Shreya Ghoshal (for song "To Chand Rati")	Nominated	
Fakt Marathi Cine Sanman	27 July 2022	Best Playback Singer – Female	Aarya Ambekar (for song "Bai Ga")	Won	
Pravah Picture Awards	16 September 2022	Best Music Director	Ajay–Atul (for song "Chandra")	Nominated	
Pravah Picture Awards	16 September 2022	Best Music Director	Ajay–Atul (for song "Bai Ga")	Won	
Pravah Picture Awards	16 September 2022	Best Lyricist	Guru Thakur (for song "Bai Ga")	Nominated	
Pravah Picture Awards	16 September 2022	Best Playback Singer – Female	Shreya Ghoshal (for song "Chandra")	Won	
Pravah Picture Awards	16 September 2022	Best Playback Singer – Female	Aarya Ambekar (for song "Bai Ga")	Nominated	
Pravah Picture Awards	16 September 2022	Best Song	"Chandra"	Nominated	
Pravah Picture Awards	16 September 2022	Best Song	"Bai Ga"	Won	
Pravah Picture Awards	16 September 2022	Best Choreography	Ashish Patil (for song "Bai Ga")	Won	
Maharashtracha Favourite Kon?	20 January 2023	Favourite Song	Ajay–Atul (for song "Chandra")	Won	
Maharashtracha Favourite Kon?	20 January 2023	Favourite Singer – Female	Shreya Ghoshal (for song "Chandra")	Won	
MATA Sanman	3 March 2023	Best Music Director	Ajay–Atul	Nominated	
MATA Sanman	3 March 2023	Best Lyricist	Guru Thakur (for song "To Chand Rati")	Nominated	
MATA Sanman	3 March 2023	Best Playback Singer – Female	Shreya Ghoshal (for song "Chandra")	Won	
MATA Sanman	3 March 2023	Best Playback Singer – Female	Aarya Ambekar (for song "Bai Ga")	Nominated	
Zee Chitra Gaurav Puraskar	13 March 2023	Best Music Director	Ajay–Atul	Won	
Zee Chitra Gaurav Puraskar	13 March 2023	Best Playback Singer – Female	Aarya Ambekar (for song "Bai Ga")	Won	
Zee Chitra Gaurav Puraskar	13 March 2023	Best Playback Singer – Female	Shreya Ghoshal (for song "Chandra")	Won	
Zee Chitra Gaurav Puraskar	13 March 2023	Best Lyricist	Guru Thakur	Nominated	
Zee Chitra Gaurav Puraskar	13 March 2023	Best Choreography	Deepali Vichare (for song "Chandra")	Won	
Zee Chitra Gaurav Puraskar	13 March 2023	Best Choreography	Ashish Patil (for song "Bai Ga")	Won	
Maharashtra Gaurav Sanman	26 March 2023	Best Playback Singer	Aarya Ambekar (for song "Bai Ga")	Won	
Maharashtra Gaurav Sanman	26 March 2023	Best Choreography	Ashish Patil (for song "Bai Ga")	Won	
Filmfare Marathi Awards	30 March 2023	Best Music Director	Ajay–Atul	Won	
Filmfare Marathi Awards	30 March 2023	Best Lyricist	Ajay–Atul, Guru Thakur (for song "Bai Ga")	Nominated	
Filmfare Marathi Awards	30 March 2023	Best Playback Singer – Male	Ajay Gogavale (for song "Kanha")	Nominated	
Filmfare Marathi Awards	30 March 2023	Best Playback Singer – Female	Aarya Ambekar (for song "Bai Ga")	Won	
Filmfare Marathi Awards	30 March 2023	Best Playback Singer – Female	Shreya Ghoshal (for song "Chandra")	Nominated	
Filmfare Marathi Awards	30 March 2023	Best Choreography	Deepali Vichare (for song "Chandra")	Won	
Filmfare Marathi Awards	30 March 2023	Best Choreography	Ashish Patil (for song "Bai Ga")	Nominated	
Sakal Premier Awards	12 April 2023	Best Lyricist	Ajay–Atul, Guru Thakur (for song "Bai Ga")	Nominated	
Sakal Premier Awards	12 April 2023	Best Music Director	Ajay–Atul	Nominated	
Sakal Premier Awards	12 April 2023	Best Playback Singer – Female	Aarya Ambekar (for song "Bai Ga")	Won	
Sakal Premier Awards	12 April 2023	Best Choreography	Deepali Vichare (for song "Chandra")	Nominated	
Sakal Premier Awards	12 April 2023	Best Choreography	Ashish Patil (for song "Bai Ga")	Nominated	
Navarashtra Planet Marathi Film & OTT Awards	5 May 2023	Best Lyricist	Ajay–Atul, Guru Thakur (for song "Bai Ga")	Won	
Navarashtra Planet Marathi Film & OTT Awards	5 May 2023	Best Music Director	Ajay–Atul	Won	
Navarashtra Planet Marathi Film & OTT Awards	5 May 2023	Best Playback Singer – Female	Shreya Ghoshal (for song "Chandra")	Nominated	
Navarashtra Planet Marathi Film & OTT Awards	5 May 2023	Best Playback Singer – Female	Aarya Ambekar (for song "Bai Ga")	Won	
Navarashtra Planet Marathi Film & OTT Awards	5 May 2023	Best Choreographer	Deepali Vichare (for song "Chandra")	Won	
Navarashtra Planet Marathi Film & OTT Awards	5 May 2023	Best Choreographer	Ashish Patil (for song "Bai Ga")	Won	
City Cine Awards	2023	Best Lyricist	Guru Thakur (for song "Chandra")	Nominated	
City Cine Awards	2023	Best Music Director	Ajay–Atul	Nominated	
City Cine Awards	2023	Best Playback Singer – Female	Shreya Ghoshal (for song "Chandra")	Won	
City Cine Awards	2023	Best Playback Singer – Female	Aarya Ambekar (for song "Bai Ga")	Nominated	
City Cine Awards	2023	Best Screenplay	Chinmay Mandlekar	Nominated	
Majja Digital Awards	17 December 2023	Outstanding Music – Lyricist	Guru Thakur (for song "Bai Ga")	Nominated	
Majja Digital Awards	17 December 2023	Outstanding Music – Original Score	Ajay–Atul	Won	
Majja Digital Awards	17 December 2023	Outstanding Music – Male Playback Singer	Ajay Gogavale (for song "Kanha")	Won	
Majja Digital Awards	17 December 2023	Outstanding Music – Female Playback Singer	Shreya Ghoshal (for song "Chandra")	Nominated	
Majja Digital Awards	17 December 2023	Outstanding Music – Female Playback Singer	Aarya Ambekar (for song "Bai Ga")	Won	
Maharashtra State Film Awards	5 August 2025	Best Male Playback Singer	Ajay Gogavale (for song "Kanha")	Nominated	
Maharashtra State Film Awards	5 August 2025	Best Female Playback Singer	Aarya Ambekar (for song "Bai Ga")	Won	
