= Ararara =

- Official song cover

Single by Adarsh Shinde

from the album Mulshi Pattern
- Language: Marathi
- Released: 19 September 2018
- Studio: Dawn Studios
- Genre: Soundtrack
- Length: 3:51
- Label: Zee Music Company
- Composer: Narendra Bhide
- Lyricist: Pranit Kulkarni
- Producer: Abhijit Bhosale Genuine Productions

Music video
- Ararara on YouTube

"Ararara" is an Indian song, composed by Narendra Bhide, sung by Adarsh Shinde and lyrics are penned by Pranit Kulkarni for the soundtrack album of the 2018 Marathi-language film Mulshi Pattern. It was released on 19 September 2018 as the first single from the album, through Zee Music Company.

The song become viral on social media, specially the dance steps of Pravin Tarde. Song crossed over 90 million views in YouTube. It was remade in Bollywood as "Bhai Ka Birthday" for the soundtrack of Antim: The Final Truth.

== Credits ==
Credits adapted from YouTube.

- Adarsh Shinde – singer
- Narendra Bhide – music
- Pranit Kulkarni – lyrics
- Tushar Pandit – mix
- Ishaan Devastalli – mix
- Umesh Jadhav – choreographer
- Zee Music Company – label

== Music video ==
The song is picturised on Pravin Tarde, who is a director of the film. The song featured gangsters Amol Shinde and Vitthal Shelar, which later embroiled the song in a controversy. It was choreographed by Umesh Jadhav. Punit Balan and Abhijeet Bhosale also appeared in the song.

== Reception ==
It was crossed over 1 million views in YouTube just in 10 days. Later song gained 50 million views.

== Controversy ==
Controversy emerged over the inclusion of criminals Amol Shinde and Vitthal Shelar in a song. Shelar, from Botarwadi in Mulshi, has a criminal record for extortion and kidnapping, leading to two deaths. Shinde, the uncontested Sarpanch of Watunde village, faces multiple charges, including murder, robbery, and rioting.
