= Bhurum Bhurum =

- Official song cover

Song by Avdhoot Gupte, Vaishali Samant

from the album Pandu
- Language: Marathi
- Released: 15 November 2021 (video song)
- Genre: Soundtrack
- Length: 3:47
- Label: Zee Music Company
- Songwriter: Avadhoot Gupte
- Composer: Avadhoot Gupte
- Producer: Zee Studios

Pandu track listing
- 1. "Bhurum Bhurum"; 2. "Kelewadi"; 3. "Dada Parat Ya Na"; 4. "Badluck Kharab Hay"; 5. "Jaanata Raja"

Music video
- Bhurum Bhurum on YouTube

"Bhurum Bhurum" is a Marathi song from the soundtrack album of the 2021 comedy drama film Pandu, directed by Viju Mane. Written and composed by Avadhoot Gupte, who also sung the song with Vaishali Samant. The music video of the track is picturised on actors Bhau Kadam and Sonalee Kulkarni.

== Credits ==
Credits adapted from YouTube.

- Singer – Avadhoot Gupte & Vaishali Samant
- Composer – Avadhoot Gupte
- Assistant Music Composer – Nitin Dhole
- Lyricist – Avadhoot Gupte
- Arranger/Programmer – Avinash Lohar
- Live Rhythm – Prabhakar Mosamkar
- Recording Studio – Ajivasan Sounds/Audio Art
- Recording – Avdhut Wadkar/Ganesh Pokale
- Mixed And Mastered By Vijay Dayal

== Critical reception ==
Shaheen Irani of OTTPlay called it commercial song that comes as a welcome surprise after a dramatic moment. How he gets into trouble with the mother and wife fighting is well explored in the film.

== Accolades ==
Year	Award	Category	Recipient (s) and Nominee (s)	Result	Ref.
2021	Filmfare Awards Marathi	Best Lyricist	Avadhoot Gupte	Nominated	
2021	Filmfare Awards Marathi	Best Female Playback Singer	Vaishali Samant	Nominated	
2021	Maharashtracha Favourite Kon?	Favourite Song	"Bhurum Bhurum"	Nominated	
2021	Maharashtracha Favourite Kon?	Favourite Singer – Male	Avadhoot Gupte	Nominated	
2021	Maharashtracha Favourite Kon?	Favourite Singer – Female	Vaishali Samant	Nominated	
20a23	Zee Chitra Gaurav Puraskar	Best Playback Singer – Male	Avadhoot Gupte	Nominated	
2022	Radio City Cine Awards	Best Lyricist	Avadhoot Gupte	Nominated	
