= Chandra (song) =

2022 Marathi song from the film Chandramukhi

- Official song cover, featuring actress Amruta Khanvilkar

Song by: Shreya Ghoshal

from the album Chandramukhi
- Language: Marathi
- Released: 29 April 2022
- Genre: Filmi; Lavani
- Length: 5:41
- Label: Everest Marathi
- Composer: Ajay-Atul
- Lyricist: Guru Thakur

Music videos
- "Chandra" on YouTube

"Chandra" is the title song of the 2022 Indian Marathi period romantic drama film Chandramukhi, directed by Prasad Oak. The song was composed by Ajay-Atul, with lyrics penned by Guru Thakur and sung by Shreya Ghoshal. The song was picturised with Amruta Khanvilkar as the lead along with Adinath Kothare. The song got widespread praise from reviewers and audiences alike, and it quickly became a blockbuster.

== Development ==
Ajay-Atul was approached by Amruta Khanvilkar and Prasad Oak to compose the music for the film. This marked the duo's comeback to the Marathi film industry after a four-year absence. Deepali Vichare choreographed the dance, while Guru Thakur wrote the lyrics. Shreya Ghosal recorded her portion of the song in a single day, whereas the entire song took three days to record. The song was shot in three days. Khanvilkar described the song as "one of the most challenging song sequences" she has ever performed. Khanvilkar's look for the Chandra song features a 9.5 metre-long Kaashtha saree which was stitched around her while draping, and she wore intricate real gold jewellery designed by P. N. Gadgil Jewellers featuring Nath, Thushi, and Kolhapuri Saaj, which are traditional Maharashtrian ornaments. Additionally, she also wore ghungroo weighing up to 3 kg on each leg.

== Picturization ==
The song's music video features Amruta Khanvilkar and Adinath Kothare. The song depicts Chandramukhi's introduction in the film, and Daulatrao's first glance at her occurs as she is performing a private lavani in front of him in a beautiful hall. The song portrays Chandramukhi's characteristics from the inside out.

== Release ==
The song was officially released on 29 March 2022 on the Everest Marathi YouTube channel. Before the release, Khanvilkar had performed the song at an event held at the Royal Opera House to unveil Chandramukhi's face. The song was released on almost all online streaming platforms on 31 March 2022. For promotions, Khanvilkar and Kothare performed songs at Chhatrapati Shivaji Maharaj International Airport during the grand poster release of Chandramukhi on the SpiceJet plane and in the Pune Metro train. The full audio album was released on 30 April 2022.

== Receptions ==
The song became extremely popular and topped the charts. By October 2022, the official music video had crossed over 100 million views on YouTube. Due to popularity and high demand, the actress of the song, Amruta Khanvilkar, performed this number in many concerts in India. The music composition by Ajay-Atul, the performance by Khanvilkar and Guru Thakur's lyrics were highly applauded.

== Accolades ==
Award	Category	Recipient(s)	Result
City Cine Awards	Best Lyricist	Guru Thakur	Nominated
City Cine Awards	Best Playback Singer – Female	Shreya Ghoshal	Won
Filmfare Awards Marathi	Best Playback Singer – Female	Shreya Ghoshal	Nominated
Filmfare Awards Marathi	Best Choreography	Deepali Vichare	Won
Maharashtracha Favourite Kon?	Favourite Song	Ajay-Atul	Won
Maharashtracha Favourite Kon?	Favourite Singer – Female	Shreya Ghoshal	Won
Majja Digital Awards	Outstanding Music – Female Playback Singer	Shreya Ghoshal	Nominated
MATA Sanman	Best Playback Singer – Female	Shreya Ghoshal	Won
Navarashtra Planet Marathi Film & OTT Awards	Best Playback Singer – Female	Shreya Ghoshal	Nominated
Navarashtra Planet Marathi Film & OTT Awards	Best Choreography	Deepali Vichare	Won
Pravah Picture Awards	Best Music Director	Ajay-Atul	Nominated
Pravah Picture Awards	Best Singer – Female	Shreya Ghoshal	Won
Pravah Picture Awards	Best Song	Chandra	Nominated
Sakal Premier Awards	Best Choreography	Deepali Vichare	Nominated
Zee Chitra Gaurav Puraskar	Best Playback Singer – Female	Shreya Ghoshal	Won
Zee Chitra Gaurav Puraskar	Best Choreography	Deepali Vichare	Won

== See also ==
- Chandramukhi
- List of accolades received by Chandramukhi (2022 film)
- Chandramukhi (2022 soundtrack)
