= Prahlad Shinde =

Singer from Maharashtra

- Born: Prahlad Bhagvanrao Shinde; 1933; Mangalwedha, Solapur, Maharashtra
- Died: 23 June 2004 (aged 70–71)
- Occupations: Singer, Tabla Player
- Children: Anand Shinde; Milind Shinde; Dinkar Shinde

Prahlad Bhagvanrao Shinde (1933 – 23 June 2004), was a Marathi singer from Maharashtra. He was famous for devotional songs, Ambedkarite songs, and Qawwalis.

== Early life ==
Shinde was born on 1933 in Mangalwedha village of Solapur to Bhagvanrao and Sonabai Shinde. He was the youngest child and had two elder brothers. He was introduced to music when he started accompanying his parents to do Kirtan and street singing to make the ends meet due to abject poverty. During his young age, he worked as a tabla player and chorus in Ismail Azad's Troupe and even got a chance to sing a small part in song Haider Ki Talvar. His Master's Voice gave a break to him when they release his first album which had four devotional songs. He went on to sing many Devotional and Folk songs which made him famous in Maharashtra. He also sang few Qawwalis.

== Shinde family ==
Shinde married Rukminibai. Singers Anand Shinde, Milind Shinde and Dinkar Shinde are his sons. Adarsh Shinde, Utkarsh and Harshad, son of Anand, are his grandsons.

== Selected discography ==
His selected filmography is as below.

- Ashiqana Aur Nasihat Aamez Qawwali - 1975
- Ismail Azad Qawwal Ki Char Yaadgaar Qawwaliyan - 1990
- Pratham Namu Gautama - 1991
- Sai Mauli - 1995
- Mere Sai - 1996
- Tyagi Bheemraao - 1996
- Bheem Jwalamukhi - 1997
- Paule Chalati Pandharichi Vaat - 1997
- Vitthalachi Vaari - 1999
- Topiwalyan Ishara Kela - 2000
- Trisaran Ka Tika (Bheem Geet) - 2000
- Sampoorna Jagran - 2001
- Jejuricha Raja - 2001
- Mahima Mothaya Mahadevaacha - 2001
- Chala Jaau Aalandila - 2001
- Sanwalya Vitthla - 2001
- Pandhrila Jauni Yeto - 2001
- Bappa Moraya Re
