= Zala Bobhata =

Zhala Bobhata
- Directed by: Anup Ashok Jagdale
- Screenplay by: Arvind Jagtap
- Story by: Anup Jagdale
- Produced by: Sainath Rajadhyaksha
- Starring: Dilip Prabhavalkar; Kamlesh Sawant; Sanjay Khapre; Bhalchandra Kadam
- Cinematography: Krishna Soren
- Edited by: Faisal Mahadik
- Music by: AV Prafullachandra
- Production company: Kings Creation Digitechno Enterprise
- Release date: 6 January 2017
- Country: India
- Language: Marathi

Zhala Bobhata (झाला बोभाटा) is a 2017 Marathi comedy movie starring veteran actor Dilip Prabhavalkar, Kamlesh Sawant, Sanjay Khapre, Bhalchandra Kadam. The film is written and directed by Anup Ashok Jagdale and its screenplay and dialogues are written by Chala Hawa Yeu Dya writer Arvind Jagtap. It had its theatrical release on 6 January 2017.

== Plot ==
The villagers try to heal an ill man so he can reveal the name of a cheating wife.

== Cast ==
- Dilip Prabhavalkar
- Kamlesh Sawant
- Sanjay Khapre
- Bhalchandra Kadam
- Reena Aggarwal
- Mayuresh Pem
- Monalisa Bagal
- Balkrishna Shinde
