= Adarsh Shinde =

Indian playback singer (born 1988)

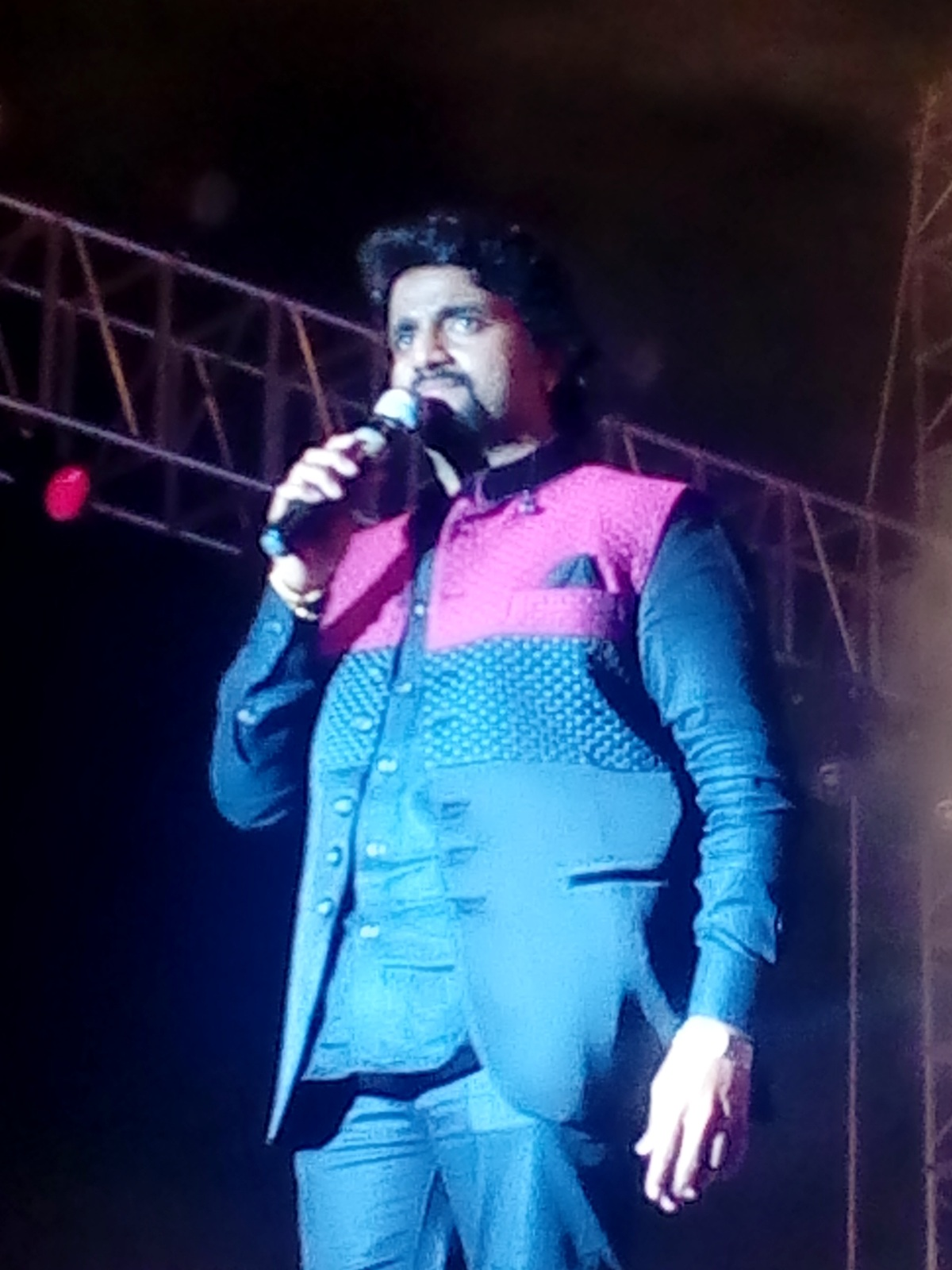
- Adarsh in 2018
- Born: 7 March 1988 (age 38); Mumbai, Maharashtra, India
- Occupation: Playback singer
- Years active: 2014–present
- Spouse: Neha Lele (m. 2015)

Adarsh Anand Shinde (born 7 March 1988) is an Indian playback singer. He records Ambedkarite songs and Marathi language film songs.

== Early life ==
Adarsh Shinde comes from a family of singers. His father, Anand Shinde, and grandfather, Prahlad Shinde, were also singers. Shinde started learning to sing at the age of ten. He had lessons in classical music from Suresh Wadkar. The Shinde family is influenced by B. R. Ambedkar and follows Buddhism.

Shinde married Neha Lele on 27 May 2015 in a Buddhist marriage held in Mumbai.

== Career ==
Adarsh Shinde is a notable Ambedkarite singer. He has sung many songs about B. R. Ambedkar and Buddhism. He started his career by singing on an album with his father and uncle Milind Shinde. He appeared on the television reality show "Let It Go!"

In 2014, the Shinde family sang together for the film Priyatma, which was the first such incident of three generations singing together in the Marathi film industry. Bhimraya Majha Bhimraya is the title song of the Dr. Babasaheb Ambedkar series composed by Adarsh Shinde and his brother Utkarsh Shinde, while sung by Adarsh Shinde.

Adarsh Shinde has sung more than 1500 songs in both Marathi and Hindi languages.

== Discography ==
Year	Film	Song	Co-singer	Ref.
2013	Narbachi Wadi	"Gazaal Khari Kay"	Solo	
2013	Narbachi Wadi	"Shabay Shabay"	Aanandi Joshi	
2013	Duniyadari	"Deva Tujhya Gabharyala"	Kirti Killedar; Aanandi Joshi	
2015	Dagadi Chawl	"Morya Morya"	Solo	
2015	Mitwaa	"Dur Dur"	Swapnil Bandodkar; Bela Shende	
2015	Tu Hi Re	"Sundara, Jeev Ha Saang Na"	Solo	
2015	Timepass 2	"Sunya Sunya"	Ketaki Mategaonkar	
2015	Classmates	"Aala Re Raja"	Solo	
2016	Laal Ishq	"Chimani"	Amitraj, Swwapnil Joshi, Jaywant Wadkar, Piyush Ranade	
2016	Photocopy	"Mora Piya"	Solo	
2016	Disco Sanya	"Sadh Majh Roop"	Solo	
2016	Disco Sanya	"Chinga Bhunga"	Solo	
2016	Kaul Manacha	"Kaul Niyatishi"	Solo	
2016	Poshter Girl	"Awaaj Vadhav DJ"	Anand Shinde	
2016	YZ	"O Kaka"	Solo	
2017	Baghtos Kay Mujra Kar	"Ti Talwar"	Solo	
2017	Baghtos Kay Mujra Kar	"Majhya Raja Ra"	Solo	
2017	Ichak	"Dashing Maina"	Solo	
2017	Ichak	"Shivray Aarti"	Solo	
2017	Thank you Vitthala	"Vithalla"	Solo	
2017	Nagarsevak Ek Nayak	"Halad Lagali"	Anand Shinde	
2017	Zala Bobhata	"Bujgavna"	Solo	
2017	Undga	"Khelatuya Khel"	Solo	
2018	Mulshi Pattern	"Ararara"	Solo	
2018	Savita Damodar Paranjpe	"Kiti Savarav; Shri Swami Samarth"	Swapnil Bandodkar; Jhanvi Prabhu Arora	
2018	Gavthi	"Saaksh"	Solo	
2018	Mithun	"Prem Tu Majh"	Solo	
2018	Boyz 2	"Goti Soda"	Rohit Raut	
2018	Farzand	"Aai Ambe Jagdambe"	Solo	
2018	Fandi	"Deva Tu Sang Na Kuthe Gela Harauni"	Solo	
2018	Mumbai Pune Mumbai 3	"Aali Thumkat Naar"	Solo	
2018	Lagna Mubarak	"Once More Laav"	Solo	
2018	Lagna Mubarak	"Deva Tujhya Naavach"	Solo	
2018	Truckbhar Swapna	"Deva Tujha Deulat"	Solo	
2019	Khari Biscuit	"Tula Japnar Aahe"	Ronkini Gupta	
2019	Dhumas	"Bhaan Sutal"	Kavita Raam	
2019	Sarva Line Vyasta Ahet	"Dilachi Taar"	Solo	
2019	Rom Com	"Gondhal"	Solo	
2019	Kaagar	"Nagin Dance"	Pravin Kunvar	
2019	Adham	"Aala Re Bhai Aala"	Solo	
2019	Fatteshikast	"Tu Jogwa Wadh May"	Solo	
2019	Malaal	"Udhal Ho"	Solo	
2020	Dhurala	"Naad Kara, Rada Dhurala"	Solo	
2020	Tanhaji	"Shankara Re Shankara"	Solo (Dubbed)	
2021	Pandu	"Jaanata Raja"	Aaboli Girhe	
2021	Pandu	"Dada Parat Yena"	Avadhoot Gupte	
2022	Samrat Prithviraj	"Hari Har"	Solo	
2022	Story Of Laagir	"Ishqach Laagir"	Solo	
2022	Jiddari	"Kaljachi Vaat Lagali"	Solo	
2022	Sarsenapati Hambirrao	"Hambir Tu"	Solo	
2022	Faas	"Faas Shirshak Geet (Title track)"	Solo	
2022	Vishu	"Majha Dev Pathi Hay"	Solo	
2022	Sher Shivraj	"Yelkot Devacha"	Juilee Joglekar	
2022	Timepass 3	"Sai Tujh Lekroo"	Solo	
2022	Timepass 3	"Nazar Kadh Deva"	Solo	
2022	Roop Nagar Ke Cheetey	"Houn Jau De"	Saurabh Salunkhe	
2022	Tamasha Live	"Wagh Aala Wagh"	Amitraj	
2022	Daagadi Chawl 2	"Sangava Aalay"	Solo	
2022	Ananya	"Celebration"	Neha Shinde	
2022	Dharmaveer 2	"Ashtami"	Solo	
2023	Jhimma 2	"Marathi Pori"	Vaishali Samant, Mugdha Karhade, Amitraj	
2023	Surya	"Berang Jawani"	Solo	
2023	Aalay Mazya Rashila	"Ambecha Gondhal"	Solo	
2023	Satarcha Salman	"I Want Turmeric; Satarcha Salman (Title Track)"	Solo	
2023	Baloch	"Tu Waagh Hay"	Avadhoot Gupte	
2023	Ravrambha	"Ek Rambha Ek Rao"	Aanandi Joshi	
2023	Ravrambha	"Haan Marda"	Solo	
2023	Sari	"Badalli Varyane Disha"	Solo	
2023	Aani Baani	"Gondhalala Ye"	Solo	
2023	Ankush	"Aala Re Aala Govinda"	Solo	
2024	Navardev Bsc. Agri	"Bhetnar Kadhi Navardeva"	Sonali Sonawane	
2024	Raghu 350	"Waghacha Pathivar Haath"	Solo	
2024	Kaasara	"Bhauchi Hawa"	Solo	
2024	Man Yedyagat Zal	"Darshan De Ganraya"	Solo	
2024	8 Don 75	"Enjoy Enjoy"	Suhit Abhyankar	
2024	Khurchi	"Ekach Raja Hya Khurchicha Haay"	Solo	
2024	Rangada	"Jivacha Maitar"	Solo	
2024	Danka Hari Namacha	"Danka Waju De"	Solo	
2024	Lagna Kallol	"Jhanjhanalya Kaljavarati"	Solo	
2024	Bhundis	"Malhar Bolato"	Solo	
2024	Aho Vikramaarka	"Aho Vikramaarka " (Title Track) (From Aho Vikramaarka)(Marathi)	Solo	
2024	Navra Maza Navsacha 2	"Dum Dum Dum Dum Damroo Waje"	Sachin Pilgaonkar	
2024	Dharmaveer 2	"Aali Shivsena"	Avinash–Vishwajeet	
2024	Naad	"Naad Khula Dance"	Anand Shinde	
2024	Naad	"Sapan Watate Ga"	Bela Shende	
2024	Paani	"Nachnar Ga"	Aanandi Joshi	
2024	Raja Rani	"Bung Bung Bungaat"	Solo	
2024	Manmauji	"Manmauji Title Track"	Solo	
2024	Hashtag Tadev Lagnam	"Nakarghanta"	Solo	
2024	Shri Ganesha	"Savar Ha Zoka"	Solo	
2025	Gadi No. 1760	"Gadi No. 1760"	Solo	
2025	Dhaap	"Sapan Kaljacha Tutla"	Solo	
2025	Ye Re Ye Re Paisa 3	Title Track "Ye Re Ye Re Paisa 3"	Vaishali Samant, Amitraj & Sachin Pathak	
2025	Aarpar	"Navsana Zalay Patch-up"	Vaishali Samant	
2025	Premachi Goshta 2	"Disla Ga Bai Disla 2.0"	Radha Khude, Vishwajeet Joshi	
2025	Reel Star	"Dhav Ghe Jara Ra"	Nayansee Sharma	
2025	Uut	"Kal Pudhe Khechto"	Solo	
2026	Case No. 73	"Deva Dev"	Solo	
2026	Super Duperr	"Nacha Danana"	Aanandi Joshi	
2026	Deool Band 2	"Mauli Swami Samarth"	Solo	
2026	Mardini	"Aai Mardini"	Solo	
2026	Maitreyaa	"Nighali Radha Soduni Gokula"	Vaishali Samant	

=== Marathi Album songs ===
Year	Song	YouTube Channel	Composer(s)	Writer(s)	Co-singer(s)
2021	"Mi Naadkhula"	Prashant Nakti	Prashant Nakti	Prashant Nakti	Sonali Sonawane
2021	"Fitoor"	VSSK Production	Ashish Khadal/Vijay Bhate	Ashish Khadal/Vijay Bhate	
2021	"Aapli Yaari"	Naadkula Music	Prashant Nakti	Prashant Nakti	Sonali Sonawane
2021	"Gulawani Gwad"	Off Beat Production	Shubam Dhadve	Kabeer Shakya	Sonali Sonawane

=== Serial title songs ===
Year	Title	Channel	Composer	Notes
2014	Jai Malhar	Zee Marathi	Pankaj Padghan	
2017	Vithu Mauli	Star Pravah	Gulraj Singh	
2018	Chhoti Malkin	Star Pravah	Devendra Bhome	
2019	Dr. Babasaheb Ambedkar – Mahamanvachi Gauravgatha	Star Pravah	Adarsh-Utkarsh Shinde	
2020	Aai Majhi Kalubai	Sony Marathi	Prakash Chavan	
2020	Dakkhancha Raja Jotiba	Star Pravah	Gulraj Singh	
2023	Ude Ga Ambe	Star Pravah	Gulraj Singh	
2026	Mi Savitribai Jotirao Phule	Star Pravah	Himself	

== Awards and nominations ==
- Filmfare Award for Best Male Playback Singer – Marathi for song Vitthala from film Ringan
- Filmfare Award for Best Male Playback Singer – Marathi for song Tula Japnar Aahe from film Khari Biscuit
- Filmfare Award for Best Male Playback Singer – Marathi for song rada Dhurala from film Dhurala
- Nominated - Filmfare Award for Best Male Playback Singer – Marathi for song Marathi Pori from film Jhimma
- Nominated - Filmfare Award for Best Male Playback Singer – Marathi for song Jaanata Raja from film Pandu
- Nominated - Filmfare Award for Best Male Playback Singer – Marathi for song Aawaz Wadhav DJ from film Poshter Girl
- Nominated - Maharashtra State Film Award for Best Male Playback Singer
- Fakt Marathi Cine Sanman for Best Playback Singer Male for song Ashtami from film Dharmaveer
- Fakt Marathi Cine Sanman for Best Playback Singer Male for song ek Rambha Ek Raav from film Ravrambha
- Nominated - Zee Chitra Gaurav Puraskar for Best Playback Singer – Male for song Marathi Pori from film Jhimma 2
- Nominated - Zee Chitra Gaurav Puraskar for Best Playback Singer – Male for song Tula Japnar Aahe from film Khari Biscuit
- Nominated - Zee Chitra Gaurav Puraskar for Best Playback Singer – Male for song Ae Sanam from film Rangaa Patangaa
- Sakaal Premier Awards - Best Male Playback Singer for song Tula Japnar Aahe from film Khari Biscuit.

== Filmography ==
=== Television ===
Year	Show	Language	Role	ref(s)
2015	Dholkichya Talavar	Marathi	Anchor	
2018	Sangeet Samrat Season 2	Marathi	Judge	
2019	Ekdam Kadak	Marathi	Host	
2024	Mi Honar Superstar	Marathi	Judge	
