= Pandu (2021 film) =

- Theatrical release poster
- Directed by: Viju Mane
- Written by: Story and Screenplay: Viju Mane; Kushal Badrike; Dialogue: Rajesh Deshpande; Samir Choughule
- Produced by: Zee Studios
- Starring: Bhalchandra Kadam; Kushal Badrike; Sonalee Kulkarni; Pravin Tarde; Prajakta mali Savita malpekar
- Cinematography: Shabbir Naik
- Edited by: Pratik S Patil
- Music by: Avdhoot Gupte
- Production company: Zee Studios
- Release date: 3 December 2021
- Running time: 118 minutes
- Country: India
- Language: Marathi

Pandu is a 2021 Indian Marathi-language comedy drama film written and directed by Viju Mane and produced by Zee Studios. The film stars Bhalchandra Kadam, Kushal Badrike, Sonalee Kulkarni and Pravin Tarde in lead roles. It was theatrically released on 3 December 2021.

== Plot ==
Pandu and Mahadu, two aspiring comedians from a village in Maharashtra, attract the attention of politician Babasaheb Pathare after performing in a comedy sketch as police officers. In need of employment, they accept his offer to join the Mumbai Police and complete the required training. After becoming constables, they develop contrasting reputations: Mahadu engages in corruption, while Pandu earns recognition for his honesty and successful arrests. Pandu also falls in love with Usha Keliwali, whom he marries. However, their lives take an unexpected turn when they discover a conspiracy to assassinate Babasaheb, in which Pandu is being used as an unwitting pawn.

== Cast ==
- Bhalchandra Kadam as Pandu
- Kushal Badrike as Mahadu Mahagade/Mahadu Havaldar
- Sonalee Kulkarni as Usha
- Pravin Tarde as Balasaheb Pathare
- Prajakta Mali as Karunatai Pathare
- Sachin Goswami as Commissioner
- Shahbaz Khan as Parvez Khan
- Anand Ingale as Inspector Gondhale Patil
- Hemangi Kavi as Sangita Mahadu Mahagade
- Savita Malpekar as Pandu's mother
- Uday Sabnis as Mantri
- Sandy as Balasaheb Bodyguard

== Release ==
=== Theatrical ===
The film was theatrically released on 3 December 2021 and premiered on 30 January 2022 on Television.

=== Home media ===
It is available for streaming on ZEE5.

== Reception ==
=== Critical reception ===
Pandu film received positive reviews from critics. Mihir Bhanage of The Times of India gave 3 out of 5 stars. Kalpeshraj Kubal of Maharashtra Times also awarded 3 out of 5 stars. Shaheen Irani of OTT Play rated 3.5 out of 5 and wrote "Pandu, is not your regular story. It has a political setup, which shows how Pandu (Pandya) became Pandu (traffic police) after being an entertainer for so long."

=== Box office ===
The film collected ₹19.1 million on its first weekend. The 10-day's net collection of movie is ₹50 million. Film grossed ₹52.9 million in two weeks. The film grossed ₹59 million at Box office collection in India.

== Soundtrack ==
Pandu

Soundtrack album by Avdhoot Gupte
- Released: 2021
- Genre: Feature film soundtrack
- Length: 22:58
- Language: Marathi
- Label: Zee Music Company

Official audio
- Pandu – Full Album on YouTube

Music is composed by Avdhoot Gupte and background score is by Anurag Godbole.

All music is composed by Avdhoot Gupte.

Track listing
No.	Title	Lyrics	Singer (s)	Length
1.	"Bhurum Bhurum"	Avdhoot Gupte	Avdhoot Gupte, Vaishali Samant	3:47
2.	"Kelewadi"	Viju Mane	Avdhoot Gupte, Sampada Mane	4:05
3.	"Dada Parat Ya Na"	Avdhoot Gupte	Avdhoot Gupte, Adarsh Shinde	3:03
4.	"Badluck Kharab Hay"	Vaibhav Joshi	Ramanand Ugale	3:48
5.	"Jaanata Raja"	Sameer Samant	Adarsh Shinde, Aaboli Girhe	2:50
Total length:				22:58

== Accolades ==
=== 2024: Maharashtra State Film Awards ===
Winners:

- Best Comedian Male – Bhalchandra Kadam
- Best Art Direction – Bhushan Rahul, Rakesh Kadam

Nominations:

- Best Choreographer – Vitthal Patil for "Bhurum Bhurum"
