= Mooknayak =

Marathi newspaper

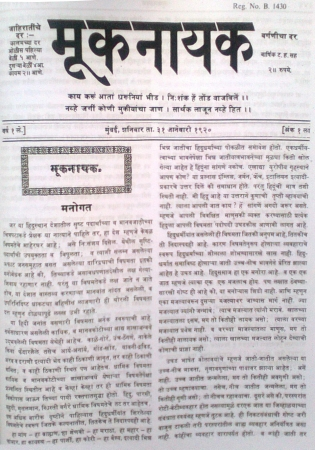
- The masthead of the first issue of ‘Mooknayak’
- Type: Weekly newspaper
- Founder(s): B. R. Ambedkar
- Founded: 31 January 1920
- Language: Marathi
- Ceased publication: April 1923
- Headquarters: Mumbai, India

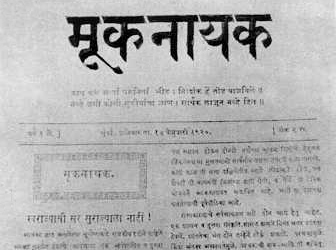
Mooknayak Cover, First Issue

Mooknayak (Marathi: मूकनायक; lit. "the Leader of Voiceless" or "The Hero of the Dumb") was a Marathi fortnightly newspaper founded by B. R. Ambedkar in 1920. The newspaper aimed to reveal the pain and rebellion of society. The first issue of Mooknayak was published on 31 January 1920. This paper was published from Mumbai. An educated youth of Mahar caste named Pandurang Nandram Bhatkar edited this Newspaper. Because Ambedkar was working as a professor in Sydenham College. Therefore, he could not work as an editor openly. So he appointed Gyandev Dhruvanath Gholap as the manager of Mooknayak. Ambedkar himself wrote the foreword in the first issue titled 'Manogat'. He also wrote articles in the next thirteen issues. Chhatrapati Rajarshi Shahu of Kolhapur had given financial assistance of Rs 2,500 for Mooknayak. Ambedkar published Mooknayak in the Marathi language, Because Marathi language was the common language or folk language of that time and B. R. Ambedkar's area of work was Maharashtra. Also at that time the Dalit people of Maharashtra were not very educated, they could only understand Marathi.

The main objective of this Newspaper was to raise the voice of Dalit, poor and oppressed people to the government and other public. For that, B. R. Ambedkar in his writings highlighted the injustice being done to the excluded untouchable community and suggested some measures to the then British government for the upliftment of that community. He always felt that for the salvation or development of the untouchables, it was necessary for the untouchables to acquire political power and educational knowledge. On 5 July 1920, Ambedkar left for London for further education. Then from 31 July 1920, the post of editor of Mooknayak came to Dnyaneshwar Dhruvanath Gholap.

Currently 19 issues of Mooknayak are available. Ambedkar wrote ideologically in it. Mooknayak created awareness that the untouchables should create a stronger position in the political sphere as well as in the social and religious spheres. 'Mooknayak' newspaper had various thoughts, current affairs, excerpts from selected letters, Kshem, Samachar, Kushal question, and Shela Pagot. Mooknayak closed in April 1923.

== First Issue ==
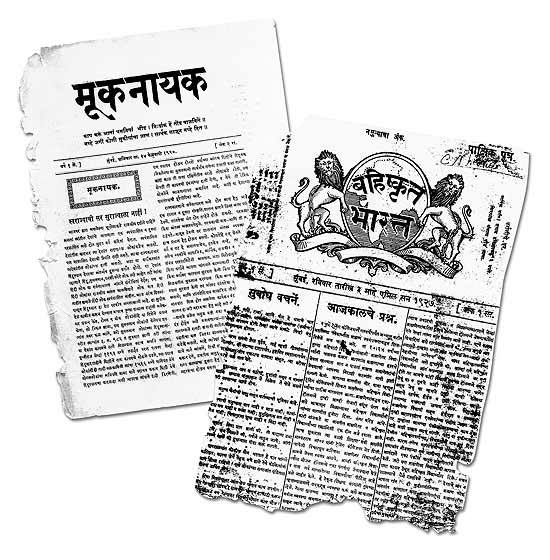
The two fortnights started by Babasaheb Mooknayak and Behishkrit Bharat

Babasaheb Ambedkar said, "For any movement to succeed, it must have a newspaper. A movement without a newspaper is like a wingless party." This newspaper created awareness among the untouchables and made them aware of their rights. The following verses of Sant Tukaram were printed on it as titles to explain the mission policy of Mooknayak.

काय करून आता धरुनिया भीड |
निःशक हे तोड वाजविले ||१||
नव्हे जगी कोण मुकियाचा जाण |
सार्थक लाजोनी नव्हे हित ||२||
