= Kolhapuri saaj =

Necklace named after Kolhapur, India

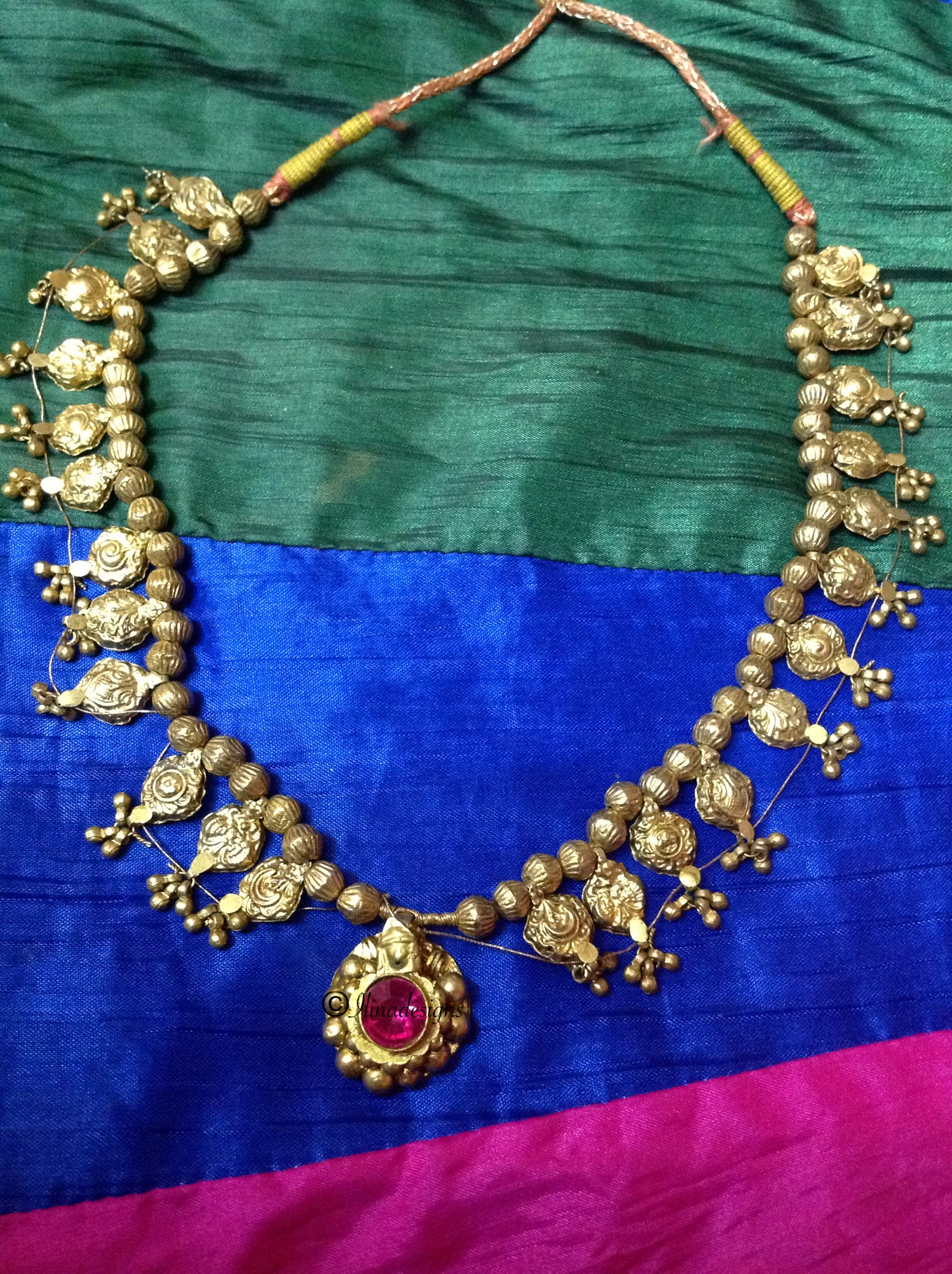
Gold necklace made in Kolhapur, Maharashtra, India

Kolhapuri saaj is a type of necklace named after Kolhapur, a city in Maharashtra, India.

Traditionally the necklace is made of 21 leaves or pendants but contemporary wearers prefer 10 to 12. Customarily the necklace is handmade, taking a week to make. A shortage of skilled manpower and its high cost have prompted the attempt to mechanise its production.
