= Viju Mane =

Indian film director

- Born: 26 July
- Occupations: Actor; Director
- Years active: 2007–present
- Known for: Bioscope, Rege
- Children: 1

Viju Mane is a Marathi film screenwriter, director, lyricist, producer, and actor from Maharashtra, India who is well known for his movies such as Shikari, Bioscope, Pandu, Monkey Baat, and Rege. Apart from direction and writing, Viju has also acted in many films such as Regeand Prabho Shivaji Raja.

== Film career ==
Viju Mane's directorial debut Gojiri (2007) starred Sunil Barve, Abhijeet Chavan, Arun Nalawade and Madhura Velankar. In 2012, he tackled a sensitive subject in Khel Mandala which addressed human relationships, disability, and the manipulative nature of the media starring Mangesh Desai and Urmila Kanetkar.

He made his acting debut in Abhijit Panse's crime drama Rege (2014). It starred Viju Mane, Mahesh Manjrekar and Santosh Juvekar. The Mahesh Manjrekar produced Shikari (2018) - a tribute to Dada Kondke and his adult comedies were directed by him. It marked the debut of Neha Khan and Survat Joshi.

== Filmography ==
- All films are in Marathi, unless otherwise mentioned.

Year	Film	Director	Actor	Writer	Producer	Notes
2026	Mamachya Govyala Jauya	Yes	Yes	Yes	No	
2021	Pandu	Yes	No	Yes	No	
2018	Monkey Baat	Yes	No	No	No	
2015	Shikari	Yes	No	No	No	
2015	Bioscope	Yes	No	Yes	Yes	
2013	Daughter	Yes	No	No	No	Hindi film
2011	Khel Mandala	Yes	No	No	No	
2011	Sharyat	Yes	No	No	No	
2010	Tee Ratra	Yes	No	No	No	
2007	Gojiri	Yes	No	No	No	

=== Television ===
Year	TV Series	Actor	Director	Writer	Producer	Language	Notes	Ref.
2016-2019	Struggler Saala	Yes	Yes	Yes	Yes	Marathi		
