= Ravrambha =

- Theatrical release poster
- Directed by: Anup Jagdale
- Written by: Pratap Gangawane
- Produced by: Shashikant Pawar
- Starring: Monalisa Bagal; Om Bhutkar; Shantanu Moghe; Ashok Samarth; Kushal Badrike; Santosh Juvekar
- Cinematography: Sanjay Jadhav
- Music by: Amitraj
- Production companies: Shashikant Pawar Productions; Devi Sateri Productions
- Release date: 26 May 2023
- Running time: 123 minutes
- Country: India
- Language: Marathi
- Budget: est.₹6−10 crore
- Box office: est.₹6.25 crore

Ravrambha is a 2023 Indian Marathi-language period romance film directed by Anup Jagdale and produced by Shashikant Pawar under the banner of Shashikant Pawar Productions in association with Devi Sateri Productions. The film stars Om Bhutkar, Monalisa Bagal, Ashok Samarth, Shantanu Moghe. It was theatrically released on 26 May 2023.

Principal photography was held in Ajinkyatara of Satara district. The music is composed by Amitraj and cinematography is by Sanjay Jadhav. The film grossed over ₹6.25 crore at the box office in India, and becoming one of the highest grossing Marathi film of 2023.

== Cast ==
- Monalisa Bagal as Rambha
- Om Bhutkar as Ravji
- Ashok Samarth as Sarnobat Prataprao Gujar
- Shantanu Moghe as Chatrapati Shivaji Maharaj
- Apurva Nemlekar as Shahin Aapa
- Kiran Mane as Hakim Chacha
- Kushal Badrike as Kurbat Khan
- Santosh Juvekar as Jalindar
- Mayuresh Pem as Ali Adil Shah II
- Rohit Chavan as Gulabya
- Ashwini Bagal as Shalu
- Shashikant Pawar as Dinkar Pawar
- Adarsh Jadhav as Antaji
- Vinayak Chaughule as Khashaba

== Production ==
The film is produced by Shashikant Pawar under the banner of Shashikant Pawar Productions. It is marked to be Anup Jagdale's first historical film. Principal photography commenced in March 2022 in Ajinkyatara.

== Release ==
Ravrambha was theatrically released on 26 May 2023. Previously film was set to be released on 7 April 2023, then it was pushed to 12 May 2023.

== Reception ==
=== Critical reception ===
Anub George of The Times of India gave 3.0 out of 5 rating praised acting performances, powerful writing and VFX. Kalpeshraj Kubal of the Maharashtra Times also rated 3 stars out of 5 stars, praised cinematography of Sanjay Jadhav, music and costume, while founded fault in Om Bhutkar's acting performance saying: failed to make the expected impression.

=== Box office ===
The film collected ₹50 lakh (US$52,000) on its opening day. The first week collection of the film is crossed ₹3.14 crore (US$330,000). It was crossed ₹6.25 crore in its third week of release.

== Soundtrack ==
Track listing
No.	Title	Singer (s)	Length
1.	"Ek Rambha, Ek Raav"	Adarsh Shinde, Aanandi Joshi	4:29
2.	"Saat Saat"	Ravindra Khomne	2:02
3.	"Haan Marda"	Adarsh Shinde	2:06
