= Chandramukhi (2022 film) =

2022 Marathi film directed by Prasad Oak

- Theatrical release poster
- Directed by: Prasad Oak
- Written by: Vishwas Patil
- Based on: Chandramukhi by Vishwas Patil
- Produced by: Akshay Bardapurkar; Piiyush Singh; Abhayanand Singh; Saurabh Gupta
- Starring: Amruta Khanvilkar; Adinath Kothare; Mrunmayee Deshpande
- Cinematography: Sanjay K. Memane
- Edited by: Faizal Mahadik; Imran Mahadik
- Music by: Ajay–Atul
- Production companies: Planet Marathi; Golden Ratio Films; Flying Dragon Entertainment; Creative Vibe
- Distributed by: Planet Marathi
- Release date: 29 April 2022
- Running time: 164 minutes
- Country: India
- Language: Marathi
- Budget: ₹5 crore
- Box office: est.₹24 crore

Chandramukhi (transl. Moon-faced or As beautiful as the moon) is a 2022 Indian Marathi-language musical romantic drama film written by Chinmay Mandlekar and directed by Prasad Oak, produced under Planet Marathi, Golden Ratio Films, Flying Dragon Entertainment & Creative Vibe. Based on a novel of the same name, written by Vishwas Patil, the film follows an intense musical love story between leading Tamasha singer and dancer Chandramukhi and a rising politician Daulatrao and its repercussions. The film stars Amruta Khanvilkar in the titular role alongside Adinath Kothare and Mrunmayee Deshpande. The songs were composed by the duo Ajay–Atul.

Chandramukhi was originally announced as a Diwali 2021 release, but it was postponed due to the COVID-19 pandemic in India and finally had its theatrically released on 29 April 2022. It received positive reviews from critics, with praise directed to the cinematography, theme, music, and performances by its lead actors, especially Khanvilkar for her portrayal of Chandra. The film received various accolades; it won three awards at the 60th Maharashtra State Film Awards out of four nominations, including Best Actress (Khanvilkar) and Best Supporting Actress (Deshpande). It received 12 nominations at the Filmfare Marathi Awards, including Best Film, Best Director (Oak), Best Actor (Kothare), and Best Actress, and won 3 awards, including Best Music Director (Ajay-Atul) and Best Female Playback Singer (Ambekar). At the Fakt Marathi Cine Sanman, it received 14 nominations and won six, including Best Actress, Best Supporting Actress, and Best Cinematography. Additionally, it won five Zee Chitra Gaurav Puraskar, four Pravah Picture Awards, and three Maharashtracha Favourite Kon Awards. The film was a commercial success, grossing ₹24 crore (US$2.5 million) at the worldwide box office, becoming the fourth highest-grossing Marathi film of 2022 and the nineteenth highest grossing Marathi film of that time.

== Plot ==
In the 1980s, former Minister of Industry Jamnalal Tripathi died, leaving a vacant seat in the Central Cabinet. This is exactly the opportunity Dadasaheb, erstwhile chief minister of Maharashtra and now a political adviser to the central government's ruling party has been waiting for. Dadasaheb has two daughters who are married to politicians. Daulat Rao Deshmane, the younger son-in-law and a virtuous minister and a potential next Minister of Industry candidate, decides to go on a pilgrimage with his wife Dolly and his father-in-law before things start. During the pilgrimage, there is an uproar in central political circles when a photo of Daulat with a lady makes the front page of a newspaper, exposing him to an extramarital liaison.

The story goes back a few months, when Daulat, contrary to his will, was taken to the door of a famous dancer by Nanasaheb Jondhale, a corrupt MLA and Dadasaheb's older son-in-law. He tried to escape but heard the voices of Ghungroo and Dholki. Curiosity gets the best of him, and he is mesmerised by Chandramukhi's beauty with the first exchange of eyes. The next morning, he misses a meeting in Delhi and travels to meet Chandramukhi with Batasharao, a former Songadya (clown). Subsequently, he began meeting Chandramukhi on a regular basis, and the two fell in love.

While spending a romantic evening in a suburb near the lakeshore, Daulat asks Chandramukhi about her past life. She tells him that she is the daughter of a famous theatre artist, Shahir Umajirao Junnarkar. One day, her father collapses from a heart attack on stage during his performance. So, her mother and she continued the troupe, which became famous in a short time. Everything was going well until one day, her entire life was turned upside down when the theatre caught fire. She later discovered that they had amassed a debt of Rs 2.5 lakh. The lender blackmails her mother by threatening to take Chandramukhi with him. At that time, Lalan solves the financial problem and takes Chandramukhi to her brothel, where she tries to pressurise her into prostitution against her will, but Chandramukhi refuses, and she doesn't turn into a prostitute. However, Lalan had tried to perform Chirabharni, a ritual that has been carried on in the most despicable oblivion (deflowering). On that specific day, a cruel stranger raped her, which she never told anyone about. But she confronted Daulat about it that evening, and they became more closer.

One fine day, Dolly finds a ghungroo (ankle bell) in her bedroom and gets suspicious of her husband, asking him to stop before things get worse. Despite being warned, Daulat keeps Chandramukhi at Panvel farmhouse so that no one suspects their relationship. Dolly finds out about this during a Diwali party and arrives at the farmhouse to humiliate Chandramukhi and ask her to get out of his life. Dolly fell ill in the process, and it was later discovered that she had a hole in her heart. Nevertheless, Daulat was unable to suppress his feelings and his love for Chandramukhi.

The story then returns to the present, Nanasaheb exposes that photo of Daulat and Chandramukhi on the front page. During a meeting with the Prime Minister in Delhi, Daulat is surprised to see Bhattasharao there, claiming that he brought Chandramukhi as Daulat messaged him. On the other hand, Nanasaheb reaches Chandramukhi's hotel room and forces her to confess that Daulat raped her, but she refuses, so Nanasaheb threatens to kill her mother. Dadasaheb realised that someone was doing this to his son-in-law on purpose, so he organised a meeting to admit that Dolly was in the picture with Daulat and that Daulat claim he has never seen Chandramukhi. To everyone's shock, Chandramukhi enters the room and reveals that she was raped by Nanasaheb, not Daulat, and she has never met Daulat. She concluded by thanking the reporters, who showed her such respect and requesting them to make some effort to peek into Tamasha artists' lives in the future as well.

At the end of the tale, Daulat and Chandramukhi meet, where she assures him that they will never meet again, though she does not tell him that she is pregnant.

== Cast ==
- Amruta Khanvilkar as Chandramukhi (Chandra) Umajirao Junnarkar
- Adinath Kothare as Daulatrao Deshmane
- Mrunmayee Deshpande as Damayanti (Dolly) Daulatrao Deshmane
- Samir Choughule as Battasharao Gangawle
- Mohan Agashe as Dadasaheb Saswadkar
- Rajendra Shisatkar as Nanasaheb Jondhale
- Radha Sagar as Shevanta
- Vandana Vaknis as Hirabai Umajirao Junnarkar
- Sachin Goswami as Chief Minister Sawant
- Surabhi Bhave as Meera; Dolly's sister
- Neha Dandale as Lalan
- Deepak Alegaonkar as Nakhwa Sheth
- Sanjay Jadhav as Patel
- Sathvik Takar as Pardeshi
- Sanjay Kadam as Reporter Nithin
- Ajith Redekar as Dr. Patnakar
- Lenoj Chungath as Suvarnan
- Madhuri Konde as Ranibai
- Nisar Shaikh as Bhangadi Sheth
- Uttara Mone as Lady Reporter
- Riya Jail as Gardbai
- Avinash Umap as Sure
- Ashok Shinde as Shahir Umajirao Junnarkar (cameo appearance)
- Prajakta Mali as Nayana Chandrapurkar (cameo appearance)
- Smita Gondkar as Mansi Prakash (cameo appearance)
- Mayank Oak as Krishna (cameo appearance)
- Shivali Parab as Young Chandra (cameo appearance)

== Production ==
=== Development ===
The story of the film is based on Vishwas Patil's novel of the same name Chandramukhi.

Actor-director Prasad Oak first read the novel in 2004 and was inspired to adapt Chandramukhi into a feature film due to his love for folk artists and thought it will be his first film as a director. He was trying to acquire the rights to the story for more than a decade, but the author Vishwas Patil was not ready for it. Meanwhile, Oak went on to direct two feature films Kachcha Limboo (2017) and Hirkani (2019).

Around 2019 Patil agreed with the idea and the development of the film started. Khanvilkar and Oak approached producer Akshay Bardapurkar, Piyush Singh, Abhayanand Singh, and Saurabh Gupta to produce the film under the banner of Planet Marathi, Golden Ratio Films, Flying Dragon Entertainment, and Creative Vibe. Oak hired Ajay–Atul for music and Chinmay Mandlekar for the screenplay, and also dialogue. Mandlekar took seven to eight months to develop the script from book. The cinematography was handled by Sanjay Memane. Nilesh Wagh, who previously worked on Court (2014), Anandi Gopal (2019) and Dhurala (2020) was in charge of the production design. National award-winning costume designer Sachin Lovalekar designed the costumes and the jewellery was provided by P. N. Gadgil Jewellers. Oak was certain from the beginning that he wanted to cast Khanvilkar as Chandramukhi though Khanvilkar and other star cast were not revealed.

=== Filming ===
Principal photography began on 8 November 2020. The mahurat shot was filmed at Masina Hospital in Byculla. The second schedule started on 7 December 2020 and ended on 18 December 2020. The various shooting locations were Bhor, Saswad, Satara and Mumbai, including Film City. The filming was completed within 45 days. The post-production of the film was wrapped towards the end of February 2021.

== Soundtrack ==
The songs were composed by duo Ajay–Atul and the lyrics were penned by Guru Thakur. This was the first collaboration of the duo with Prasad Oak. The vocals were provided by Shreya Ghoshal, Ajay Gogavale, Priyanka Barve, Madhura Datar, Vishwajeet Borvankar and Aarya Ambekar, while Mangesh Dhadke did the background score. Deepali Vichare and Ashish Patil choreographed the songs. The album was released on 30 April 2022 by Everest Marathi.

In one scene the song 'Aaj he aabhaal aahe' plays on LP. This original song is written by Mangesh Padgaonkar, sung by Mandar Apte, playback singer & music director.

Chandramukhi's soundtrack received a positive response from critics and the audience; the title track "Chandra" hit the chartbuster. The song "Bai Ga" has been listed as "the best songs of 2022" by The Indian Express.

== Marketing and release ==
The film was one of the most anticipated Marathi films of the year, and the audience's expectations were high. The film was announced in January 2020, and a short official teaser of the film was released on 13 April 2021. The first look of the poster was unveiled with a Lavani Dancer seen in political attire, but the face of the actress was under wraps. Chandramukhi was initially slated for release on 5 November 2021, coinciding with Diwali. Owing to a delay in production caused by the COVID-19 pandemic, it was postponed to 29 April 2022. Chandramukhi's makers promoted the film on a grand scale. Appropriate care was taken to avoid leaks during production. The second teaser was released on 10 February 2022. The teaser did not reveal the actors', instead making the audience puzzle about the actors from behind. The film was promoted with the tagline, "तो ध्येय धुरंधर राजकारणी… ती तमाशातली शुक्राची चांदणी… लाल दिवा आणि घुंगरांच्या गुंतावळीची… राजकीय रशिली प्रेमकहाणी…"

On 16 March 2022, Adinath Kothare was revealed as Daulat Deshmane with a 48-second teaser. A star-studded event was hosted at the Royal Opera House, the first-ever Marathi film event to be held at this heritage theatre in Mumbai on 22 March 2022. Where makers announced Chandra by unveiling Amruta Khanvilkar's 35-foot-tall cut-out in Chandra's look and she even performed Lavani on a song from the film. Subsequently, songs "Chandra", "To Chand Rati" and "Bai Ga" were released, which generated much hype for the film. Following this, the cast of Samir Choughule as Battasha, Mohan Agashe as Dadasaheb Saswadkar, and Rajendra Shisatkar as Nana Jondhale were unveiled through teasers. The almost three-minute long official trailer was released eight days prior to the film. The trailer was well received by the audience. Along with the Marathi stars, Bollywood dhak dhak girl Madhuri Dixit and global icon Priyanka Chopra Jonas had praised the trailer. Mrunmayee Deshpande was not revealed as part of the cast. A poster of her as Damayanti Daulatrao Deshmane was unveiled after the trailer, as they intended for the trailer to do so instead. The "Sawal Jawab" song, featuring Prajakta Mali and Khanvilkar, was released three days before the film's release.

The poster of Chandramukhi appeared on the SpiceJet plane, for the first time in the world of the Marathi Industry movie poster flashed on the plane. The event took place at Mumbai's Chhatrapati Shivaji Maharaj International Airport just a day before the film's release. As part of promotion, Khanvilkar was featured on the cover of Filmfare Magazine, becoming the first Marathi actor to grace the cover.

The film was released digitally on Amazon Prime Video from 20 June 2022.

== Reception ==
=== Critical reception ===
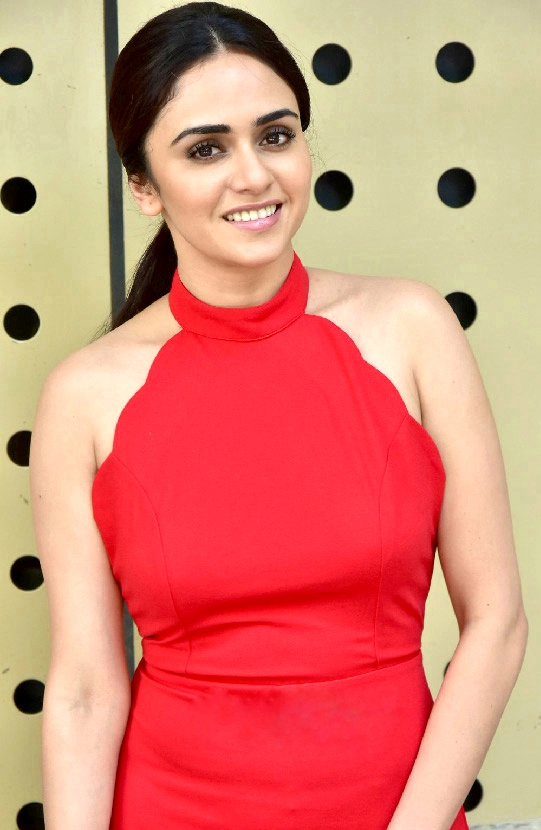
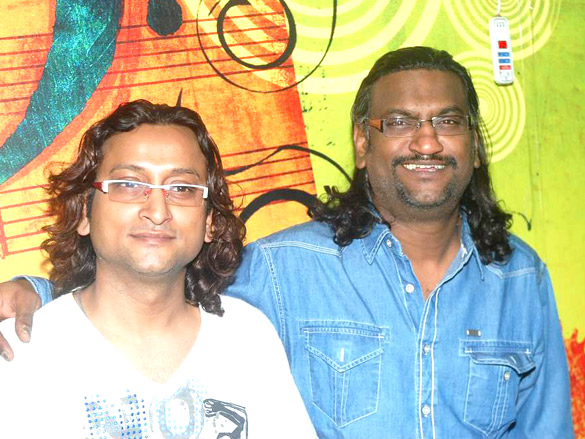
Khanvilkar and Ajay-Atul garnered widespread praise and several accolades for their respective performances.

Upon release, the film met with positive critical acclaim, with most critics applauding the cinematography, music, theme, and performances by its lead actors (especially Khanvilkar). Mihir Bhanage of The Times of India gave Chandramukhi 3 out of 5 stars, concluding, "To cut a long story short, Chandramukhi is a decent watch. With crisper editing, it could’ve been even better. A special mention to Ajay-Atul's music, that adds the required rustic touch to the songs and elevates the experience". Ruchika Bonsode of Cinetalkers rated the film 4 out of 5 stars, saying, "Overall, the film is a perfect narration of a love story that will make you emotional and respect the folk artist." Shubham Kulkarni of Koimoi, calls it a "Mixed Bag Of A Film". He praised Ajay–Atul's music and Khanvilkar's hard work and her expressive eyes. Overall, he said, "She calls him her Krishna, he calls her Goddess of her own temple, I wish that same poetry stayed alive throughout making the aching heartbeat clearer" with rating of 3 out of 5 stars.

The Week review applauds the magnum opus drama, calling it "Set against the backdrop of top-notch cinematography, screenplay and an amazing soundtrack, the cast takes audiences through a whirlwind of emotions only through a trailer. Chandramukhi lives up to the hype." Suyog Jore of Cinestaan rated 2 out of 4 stars and described Chandramukhi as "not just the love story of two unlikely people, but it is also a tribute to Maharashtra's old and rich culture of lavani and poetry." He praised Khanvilkar for her performance and noted, "the film belongs to Khanvilkar. The actress has simply poured herself into the character. If only the makers had given Chandramukhi a bit more depth, Khanvilkar's performance would have been a tour de force."

In contrary to this, Sameer Ahire wrote, "Chandramukhi is a moon-plated film which looks beautiful but lacks the gravity that could have brought it down on earth." Although he appreciated its cinematography, music and performances. Johnson Thomas of Filmibeat comparing it with Oak's previous work, he gave it 2.5 out of 5 and wrote" It's only in the final throes of the runtime that Oak manufactures a telling moment-as Chandramukhi has her final confrontation...".

Film Companion named Amruta Khanvilkar and Adinath Kothare in their "Best Performances Of May 2022" list for the scorching chemistry between them.

=== Box office ===
Chandramukhi opened on a favorable note at the box office. It collected ₹1.21 crore (US$160,000) on the first day. It collected around ₹7.42 crores (US$960,000) at the box office in five days. It collected ₹18 crores (US$2.3 million) in its opening week. The film was released with two big Hindi films, Heropanti 2 and Runway 34, on the eve of Eid on 29 April 2022. Chandramukhi not only did well at the Indian box office but also garnered attention in the foreign market. It had a successful run in UAE theatres.
