= List of awards and nominations received by Mukta Barve =

Mukta Barve awards and nominations
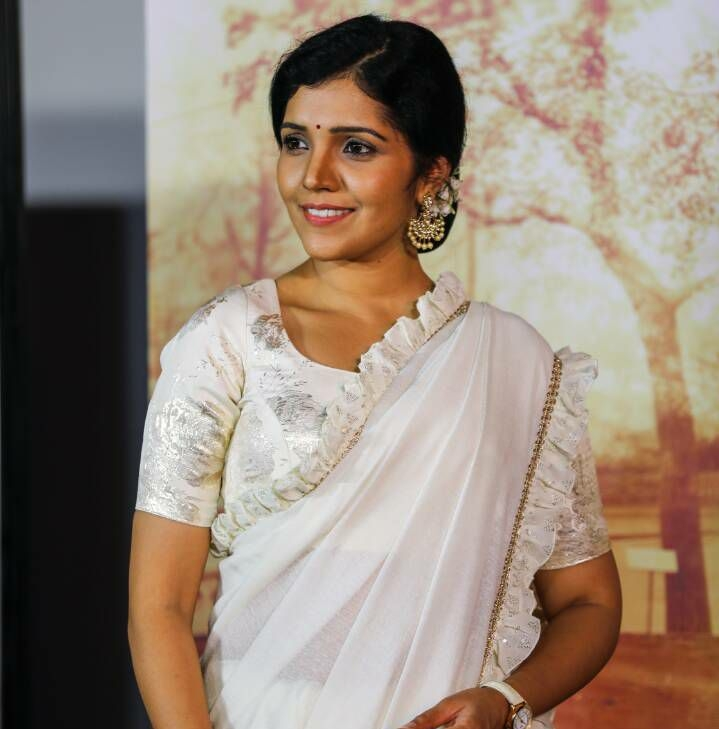
- Barve in 2017
Awards and nominations
Award	Wins	Nominations
Filmfare Marathi Awards	2	7
Maharashtra State Film Awards	7	7
Maharashtra Times Sanman	3	4
Maharashtracha Favourite Kon?	1	9
Sanskruti Kala Darpan Awards	6	7
Screen Marathi Awards	0	1
Zee Chitra Gaurav Puraskar	2	3
Zee Natya Gaurav Puraskar	7	9
Sakal Premier Awards	0	2

Totals (Note: Certain award groups do not simply award one winner. They acknowledge several different recipients, have runners-up, and have third place. Since this is a specific recognition and is different from losing an award, runner-up mentions are considered wins in this award tally. For simplification and to avoid errors, each award in this list has been presumed to have had a prior nomination.)
- Wins: 43
- Nominations: 67

Mukta Barve is an Indian actress and producer who appears primarily in Marathi films, television and theatre. She has received several awards, including seven Maharashtra State Film Awards, two Filmfare Marathi Awards, six Sanskruti Kala Darpan Awards, two Zee Chitra Gaurav Puraskar and seven Zee Natya Gaurav Puraskar.

Barve started her career through Marathi stage plays and television serials. For her play Dehbhan, she earned the Zee Natya Gaurav Puraskar for Most Promising Newcomer of the Year in 2003 and Best Supporting Actress in 2005. In 2004, she made her film debut with Chakwa, for which she received the Maharashtra State Film Awards for Most Promising Newcomer of the Year. The following years, she went on to win three Best Actress in a Commercial Play awards at the State Awards for Hum To Tere Aashiq Hain, Final Draft and Kabaddi Kabaddi, respectively. Her portrayal of a student who is unable to grasp the academic teaching in Final Draft won her much acclaim and even Best Actress Awards at the Sanskruti Kala Darpan Awards, the Maharashtra Times Sanman and two Zee Natya Gaurav Puraskar. Barve played the role of a jogtin in the film Jogwa (2009), dealing with religious superstitions in rural India, she was awarded her first Maharashtra State Film Awards for Best Actress, along with Sanskruti Kala Darpan Awards, Zee Chitra Gaurav Puraskar and MIFTA.

In 2011, Barve received Best Actress at the Pune International Film Festival for her portrayal of a physician in Aaghaat. She started her production house in 2013 with the play Chhapa Kata, in which she even acted and won Deenanath Mangeshkar Awards and Sanskruti Kala Darpan Awards for Best Play. Her role as a straightforward, middle-class insurance agent in Double Seat (2015) earned her Filmfare Marathi Awards, Maharashtra State Film Awards and Zee Chitra Gaurav Puraskar. The film even won her first Maharashtracha Favourite Kon for Best Actress, alongside eight nominations. She won her second Filmfare Best Actress for Smile Please and went on to win her seventh State Award for Bandishala in 2019.

In addition to these awards, Barve was honoured by the Sangeet Natak Akademi with the Ustad Bismillah Khan Yuva Puraskar for achievement in Marathi theatre.

== Filmfare Marathi Awards ==
The Filmfare Marathi Awards are presented annually by The Times Group for excellence of cinematic achievements in Marathi cinema.

Year	Nominated work	Category	Result	Ref.
2016	Double Seat	Best Actress	Won	
2016	Mumbai-Pune-Mumbai 2	Best Actress	Nominated	
2018	Hrudayantar	Best Actress	Nominated	
2019	Smile Please	Best Actress	Won	
2022	Y	Best Actress	Nominated	
2022	Y	Best Actress (Critics)	Nominated	
2025	Nach Ga Ghuma	Best Actress	Nominated	

== Maharashtra State Film Awards ==
The Maharashtra State Film Awards are presented annually by the Government of Maharashtra for excellence of cinematic achievements in Marathi cinema.

Year	Nominated work	Category	Result	Ref.
2005	Chakwa	Best Newcomer	Won	
2006	Hum To Tere Aashiq Hain	Best Actress in a Commercial Play	Won	
2007	Final Draft	Best Actress in a Commercial Play	Won	
2007	Kabaddi Kabaddi	Best Actress in a Commercial Play	Won	
2009	Jogwa	Best Actress	Won	
2016	Double Seat	Best Actress	Won	
2019	Bandishala	Best Actress	Won	
2025	Overall Contribution	V. Shantaram Special Contribution Award	Honoured	

== Maharashtra Times Sanman ==
Year	Nominated work	Category	Result	Ref.
2006	Final Draft	Best Actress in a Commercial Play	Nominated	
2007	Kabaddi Kabaddi	Best Actress in a Commercial Play	Won	
2017	Codemantra	Best Play	Won	
2023	Y	Best Actress	Won	

== Maharashtracha Favourite Kon ==
The Maharashtracha Favourite Kon? are presented by the Marathi television channel Zee Talkies to honour excellence in Marathi cinema.

Year	Nominated work	Category	Result	Ref.
2011	Mumbai-Pune-Mumbai	Favourite Actress	Nominated	
2012	Badam Rani Gulam Chor	Favourite Actress	Nominated	
2014	Mangalashtak Once More	Favourite Actress	Nominated	
2015	Double Seat	Favourite Actress	Won	
2016	Mumbai-Pune-Mumbai 2	Favourite Actress	Nominated	
2017	Hrudayantar	Favourite Actress	Nominated	
2018	Aamhi Doghi	Favourite Supporting Actress	Nominated	
2019	Bandishala	Favourite Actress	Nominated	
2021	Double Seat	Favourite Actress	Nominated	

== Planet Marathi Film & OTT Awards ==
Year	Nominated work	Category	Result	Ref.
2023	Y	Best Actress	Nominated	

== Sakal Premier Awards ==
Year	Nominated work	Category	Result	Ref.
2019	Smile Please	Best Actress	Nominated	
2023	Y	Best Actress	Nominated	

== Sanskruti Kala Darpan Awards ==
The Sanskruti Kala Darpan Awards are presented annually by the Archana Nevrekar Foundation to honour film, television and theatre in the Marathi film industry.

Year	Nominated work	Category	Result	Ref.
2007	Final Draft	Best Actress in a Commercial Play	Won	
2009	Jogwa	Best Actress	Won	
2014	Chhapa Kata	Best Play	Won	
2014	Chhapa Kata	Best Actress	Won	
2016	Double Seat	Best Actress	Nominated	
2017	Codemantra	Best Play	Won	
2017	Codemantra	Best Actress	Won	

== Screen Marathi Awards ==
Year	Nominated work	Category	Result	Ref.
2014	Lagna Pahave Karun	Best Actress	Nominated	

== Zee Chitra Gaurav Puraskar ==
Year	Nominated work	Category	Result	Ref.
2009	Jogwa	Best Actress	Won	
2011	Mumbai-Pune-Mumbai	Best Actress	Nominated	
2016	Double Seat	Best Actress	Won	
2022	Jogwa	Best Actress	Won	
2023	Y	Best Actress	Nominated	

== Zee Natya Gaurav Puraskar ==
Year	Nominated work	Category	Result	Ref.
2003	Dehbhan	Most Promising Newcomer of the Year	Won	
2005	Dehbhan	Best Supporting Actress	Won	
2005	Final Draft	Best Actress in an Experimental Play	Won	
2007	Final Draft	Best Actress in a Commercial Play	Won	
2008	Kabaddi Kabaddi	Best Actress in a Commercial Play	Won	
2017	Codemantra	Best Play	Nominated	
2017	Codemantra	Special Recognition Play	Won	
2017	Codemantra	Best Actress	Nominated	
2017	Codemantra	Most Natural Performance of the Year	Won	

== Other awards and recognitions ==
Year	Nominated work	Award/Organisation	Category	Result	Ref.
2009	Jogwa	Marathi International Film and Theatre Awards	Best Actress	Won	
2009	—N/a	Sangeet Natak Akademi	Ustad Bismillah Khan Yuva Puraskar	Won	
2011	—N/a	Raja Paranjape Festival Awards	Tarunai Sanman Award	Won	
2011	Aaghaat	Pune International Film Festival	Best Actress	Won	
2012	—N/a	Ad Fizz	Special Achievement Award	Won	
2014	—N/a	IBN-Lokmat	Udyachi Prerna Award (Natak and Cinema)	Won	
2014	Chhapa Kata	Deenanath Mangeshkar Awards	Mohan Wagh Puraskar (Best Play)	Won	
2016	—N/a	Maharashtra One	Savitri Sanman	Won	
2016	Chhapa Kata	Lokmat Maharashtrian of the Year Awards	Theatre	Won	
2016	—N/a	Nilu Phule Sanman 2016	Intelligent actress of the year	Won	
2016	—N/a	P.L. Awards	Tarunai Sanman Puraskar	Won	
2017	Codemantra	Lokmat Maharashtrian of the Year	Theatre	Nominated	
2018	—N/a	Loksatta Tarun Tejankit	Art/Film	Won	
2018	—N/a	Priyadarshini Academy Global Awards	Smita Patil Award for Best Actress	Won	
2020	—N/a	Savitribai Phule Pune University	Yuva Gaurav Puraskar	Won	
2024	Charchaughi	Majha Puraskar	Best Actress	Won	
2025	Contribution to Marathi Cinema	Government of Maharashtra	V. Shantaram Special Contribution Award	Honoured	
