= List of Marathi films of 2006 =

A list of films produced by the Marathi language film industry based in Maharashtra in the year 2006.

== January–March ==
	Opening	Title	Director	Cast	Producer	Notes	Genre	Source
J A N
F E B	9	The Truck of Dreams	Arun Kumar	Peeya Rai Chowdhary, Chaitanya Deshpande, Sharad Deshpande	Percept Picture Company, Sahara One Motion Pictures		Drama	
M A R	26	Maati Maay	Chitra Palekar	Mukta Barve, Nandita Das, Kshitij Gavande	DNYA Films	Nandita Das's Marathi cinema Debut	Drama	

== April–June ==
	Opening	Title	Director	Cast	Producer	Notes	Genre	Source
A P R	10	Matichya Chuli	Atul Kale, Sudesh Manjrekar	Ankush Choudhary, Madhura Velankar, Sudhir Joshi, Vandana Gupte, Anand Abhyankar	Ashwami Films, Everest Entertainment		Comedy, Drama	
A P R	14	Kshan	Mandar Devasthali	Subodh Bhave, Deepa Parab, Prasad Oak	Amol Production		Drama, Romance	
A P R	14	Hee Porgi Kunachi	Girish Mohite	Kadambari Kadam, Arun Nalawade, Nirmiti Sawant, Swati Chitnis	Amol Production		Drama, Romance	
A P R	20	Yanda Kartavya Aahe	Kedar Shinde	Ankush Choudhary, Smita Shewale, Mohan Joshi	Everest Entertainment, Nova Advertising Palace		Comedy, Romance	
M A Y
J U N	11	Shubha Mangal Saavadhan	Mahesh Kothare	Urmila Kanitkar, Niranjan Namjoshi, Ashok Saraf, Makarand Anaspure	Everest Entertainment, Mangal Sandhya Pictures		Drama, Comedy	

== July–September ==
	Opening	Title	Director	Cast	Producer	Notes	Genre	Source
J U L
A U G	1	Raasta Roko	Devashish Shedge	Mrinal Kulkarni, Sanjay Mone, Sachit Patil	Anubhuti Arts		Drama	
A U G	5	Quest	Amol Palekar	Mukta Barve, Rishi Deshpande, Mrinal Kulkarni	Drama			
S E P	30	Sawal Majha Premacha	Kumar Sohni	Ashok Saraf, Madhu Kambikar				

== October–December ==
	Opening	Title	Director	Cast	Producer	Notes	Genre	Source
O C T	13	Anandache Jhaad	Sanjay Surkar	Sunil Barve, Prashant Damle, Suhas Joshi	Everest Entertainment		Drama	
O C T	26	Hee Shrinchi Ichha	Madhusudan Kalekar	Nayan Joshi, Vijay Joshi, Ravindra Mankani	Everest Entertainment		Drama	
N O V	17	Majha Navra Tujhi Bayko	Kedar Shinde	Bharat Jadhav, Ankush Choudhary, Kranti Redkar	Shemaroo Films		Comedy	
D E C	1	Gauri	Vijay Bhanu	Priya Bhende, Raghavendra Kadkol, Kuldeep Pawar	Everest Entertainment	Sonalee Kulkarni's debut film	Drama	

== Date unknown ==
A list of Marathi films released in 2006.

Year	Film	Director	Cast	Release date	Producer	Notes	Source
2006	Golmaal	Dnyanesh Bhalekar	Bharat Jadhav, Jitendra Joshi, Amruta Khanvilkar, Atul Parchure, Savita Malpekar, Sunil Tawde	January 2006		Amruta Khanvilkar's debut film	
2006	Shevri	Gajendra Ahire	Neena Kulkarni, Mohan Agashe, Uttara Baokar	November 2006 (India)	Upstage Film Co.	National Film Award for Best Feature Film in Marathi in 2006	
2006	Bayo	Gajendra Ahire	Vikram Gokhale, Mrinal Kulkarni, Shreyas Talpade	March 2006 (India)			
2006	Sawal Majha Premacha	Kumar Sohoni	Vijay Chavan, Ajinkya Deo, Madhu Kambikar	September 2006(India)	Everest Entertainment		
2006	Pahili Sher, Dusri Savvasher, Navara Pavsher	Pitambar Kale	Ashok Saraf, Surekha Kudachi, Sarika Nilatkar		Sumeet Movies		
2006	Jatra: Hyalagaad Re Tyalagaad	Kedar Shinde	Bharat Jadhav, Kranti Redkar, Siddharth Jadhav, Priya Arun		Sri Sai Productions		
2006	Badha	Sumitra Bhave, Sunil Sukthankar	Uttara Baokar, Renuka Daftardar, Amruta Subhash				
2006	Sail	Gajendra Ahire	Sandip Jadhav, Mohan Joshi, Reema Lagoo				
2006	Restaurant	Sachin Kundalkar	Hemu Adhikari, Uttara Baokar, Sameer Dharmadhikari		Ascem Entertainment		
2006	Blind Game	Rajeev Patil	Anant Jog, Mangesh Desai, Prashant Patil, Upendra Limaye, Mukta Barve, Santosh Juvekar		Rajeev Patil		
2006	Chashme Bahaddar	Vijay Patkar	Sanjay Narvekar, Dipali Sayyad, Rasika Joshi, Vijay Chavan	September 2006	Shardul Films, Video Palace		
2006	Nana Mama	Sameer Kulkarni	Bharat Jadhav, Makarand Anaspure, Vijay Chavan		A.V. Telefilms		
2006	Aai Shappath..!	Sanjay Surkar	Mansi Salvi, Shreyas Talpade, Ankush Choudhary	July 2006	Omkar Entertainments		
2006	Aaila Re!!	Deepak Naidu	Ankush Choudhary, Jitendra Joshi, Pallavi Subhash		Fine Lines Creations		
2006	Nital	Sumitra Bhave, Sunil Sukthankar	Devika Daftardar, Shekhar Kulkarni, Uttara Baokar		Shweta Association		
2006	Lapun Chapun	Kumar Sohoni	Vikram Gokhale, Bharat Jadhav, Kavita Lad	October 2006 (India)	Everest Entertainment		
2006	Divasen Divas	Gajendra Ahire	Bharati Achrekar, Sunil Barve, Vandana Gupte		Saaransh Ads		
2006	Naatigothi	Gajendra Ahire	Mangesh Desai, Vrunda Gajendra, Alka Kubal, Smita Tambe		Badris Films		
2006	Devashappath Khote Sangen	Sanjeev Kolte	Priya Arun, Vijay Chavan		Apratim Film		
2006	Manthan: Ek Amrut Pyala	Mrunalinni Patil	Padmini Kolhapure, Milind Gunaji				
