= Pyarge Aagbittaite (film) =

- Directed by: Kevin Bala
- Written by: Keshavaditya (dialogues)
- Screenplay by: Kevin Bala
- Based on: Mumbai-Pune-Mumbai by Parag Kulkarni and Satish Rajwade
- Produced by: Shoba Prakash
- Starring: Komal Kumar; Prathana Prabhu
- Cinematography: Balabharani
- Edited by: Suresh Urs
- Music by: Dharma Teja
- Release date: 5 September 2013
- Country: India
- Language: Kannada

Pyarge Aagbittaite is a 2013 Indian Kannada-language romantic drama film directed by Kevin Bala and starring Komal and Prathana Prabhu. The film's title is based on the song of the same name and it is a remake of Mumbai-Pune-Mumbai (2010). The film was a box office failure.

== Plot ==
A girl from Bangalore meets a boy from Mysore.

== Cast ==
- Komal as Sot Somappa Hebbet Mane
- Prathana Prabhu
- Akul Balaji
- Tennis Krishna
- Master Anand
- Sathyajith
- Honnavalli Krishna
- Rachana Maurya (special appearance in the song "Aata Samanu")

== Production ==
The film was initially had a different title but reverted to the current title after the original title had been registered under someone else's name. Mangalore-based dancer Prathana Prabhu made her debut with this film after the director saw one of her dances. She initially rejected the film but accepted after watching Mumbai-Pune-Mumbai (2010). The muhurat shot of the film took place in May 2013. The director, who worked as an assistant director for Singam (2010), only knew Tamil and had to have a Kannada translator. Komal wrote some of his dialogues for the film. The film was shot in a single schedule in Bangalore, Kasargod, Mysore, and Sakleshpur. The film was reportedly in the top ten of a microblogging website. The film finished production and was ready for release a hundred days after it entered production.

== Soundtrack ==
The music for the film was composed by Dharma Teja. An audio launch was held in Bangalore with Ambareesh in attendance. Two songs "Cheluve" and "Yenidu Maya" were reused from Made In Vizag (2013), the Telugu remake of Mumbai-Pune-Mumbai, respectively.

Track listing
No.	Title	Lyrics	Singer(s)	Length
1.	"Aata Samanu"	K. Kalyan	Shashank, Sunitha
2.	"Cheluve" (based on "Bahushaa" from Made In Vizag)	Jayanth Kaikini	Santhosh
3.	"Yenidu Maya" (based on "Kaalame Thanu" from Made In Vizag)	Ramnarayan	Rajesh Krishnan, Anuradha Bhat

== Reception ==
A critic from The Times of India wrote that "Komal has proved that he can shine in serious roles too with a neat performance. Prarthana is good. Akul Balaji is a waste. Music by Dharmateja and camera by Balabharani are average".
