= Vikram Phadnis =

Indian fashion designer and film director

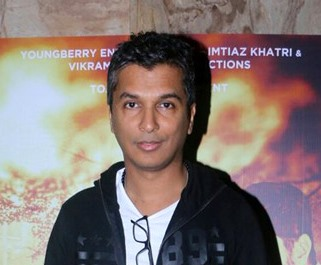
- Phadnis in 2017 at screening of his film Hrudayantar
- Born: 1968/69
- Occupations: Fashion designer Film director
- Website: www.vikramphadnis.com

Vikram Phadnis is an Indian fashion designer and film director. He started his career in Bollywood as a choreographer and established himself as a fashion designer with his main highlights being Indian traditional wear. He has designed clothes for various celebrities like Naomi Campbell, Amitabh Bachchan, Sridevi, Sushmita Sen, Malaika Arora and more. He has directed two Marathi films Hrudayantar (2017) and Smile Please (2019).

== Career ==
=== Fashion ===
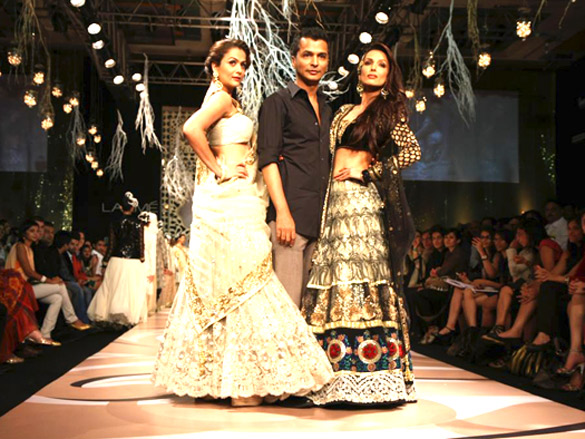
Amrita Arora (l) and Malaika Arora (r) at the 2012 Lakme Fashion Week along with Phadnis (c) showcasing his designer lehengas.

Phadnis comes from a family of doctors and his parents wanted him to be a doctor as well. However, he had inclination towards the entertainment industry and started dance choreography in his college days. He worked in one of the fashion shows as designer and was encouraged by other designers to take this professionally. In 1991, Phadnis showcased his first collection. In 2005, he showcased his collection with international cricketers like Jonty Rhodes, Glenn McGrath and Wasim Akram. In 2009, he designed for Naomi Campbell when she participated in the charitable show "Mai Mumbai" which was organized to raise funds for the 2008 Mumbai 26/11 terrorist attack.

Phadnis credits actor Salman Khan for supporting him in his early career days stating that he "selflessly gave me a standing in the industry and the opportunity". He has worked as costume designer for various Bollywood films like Biwi No.1 (1999), Mujhse Shaadi Karogi (2004), Golmaal: Fun Unlimited (2006), Salaam-e-Ishq (2007), Namastey London (2007), Golmaal Returns (2008), Dulha Mil Gaya (2010) and more. For the film Salaam-e-Ishq, he designed around 800 costumes for all the on-screen characters from lead actors to background dancers.

In 2005, he won IIFA award in Best Costume Design category for the film Mujhse Shaadi Karogi along with Global Indian Film Award.

=== Film direction ===
In 2017, Phadnis directed his first Marathi film Hrudayantar which was followed by Smile Please in 2019. Plots of both the films were written by Phadnis.

Phadnis was working on a Hindi film, writing the plot and screenplay; but the film never materialized. His debut film Hrudayantar was about the struggle of a woman dealing with a troubled marriage while also handling her daughter who was diagnosed of cancer. At the 2018 Filmfare Marathi Awards, it received nomination in twelve categories of which Phadnis won the award in Best Costumes category. The Best Film and Best Director awards; for which Phadnis was nominated, were both presented to Kaccha Limbu and its director Prasad Oak.

The film Smile Please is about a young photographer who is diagnosed with dementia. The story is based on life of Phadnis' mother. Phadnis was nominated for Best Director at the Filmfare Marathi Awards 2020. The film was also nominated for Best Film and music directors Rohan-Rohan received nomination for Best Music Album. The lead actress Mukta Barve received the award for Best Actor In A Leading Role (Female) for her performance.
