= Khushi Hajare =

Indian child actress

- Born: Khushi Siddhanth Hajare
- Occupation: Actress
- Years active: 2016–present
- Known for: Ved (2022)
- Awards: Filmfare Award Marathi (2022); Zee Chitra Gaurav Puraskar (2023)

Khushi Hajare is an Indian child actress who primarily works in Marathi and Hindi films. She is known for her role in Ved (2022), for which she earned the Filmfare Award Marathi. She has also appeared in films such as Aapdi Thaapdi (2022), Atmapamphlet (2023), Dashmi (2024), Munjya (2024), and recently appeared in the Hindi series Mrs. Deshpande (2025).

== Filmography ==
=== Film ===
| Year | Film | Role | Language | Ref. |
|---|---|---|---|---|
| 2016 | Sarbjit | Swapan Kaur (5 yrs old) | Hindi | |
| 2016 | Vazandar | Daughter of Kaveri | Marathi | |
| 2017 | The House Next Door | Sarah D'Cousta | Tamil; Hindi | |
| 2018 | Manto | Nighat 3 | Hindi | |
| 2019 | Khandaani Shafakhana | Young Baby Bedi | Hindi | |
| 2020 | Prawaas | Disha | Marathi | |
| 2020 | Bhoot – Part One: The Haunted Ship | Megha | Hindi | |
| 2022 | Aapdi Thaapdi | Tulshi | Marathi | |
| 2022 | Maja Ma | Kinjal | Hindi | |
| 2022 | Mili | Young Mili | Hindi | |
| 2022 | Ved | Khushi | Marathi | |
| 2023 | Atmapamphlet | Young Srishti | Marathi | |
| 2024 | Dashmi | Dashmi | Hindi | |
| 2024 | Munjya | Young Geeta | Hindi | |
| 2024 | Dharmarakshak Mahaveer Chhatrapati Sambhaji Maharaj | Sumi | Marathi | |
| 2025 | War 2 (Cameo) | Young Sita Kaul | Hindi | |
| 2026 | Alpha | Young Sita Kaul | Hindi | |
| 2026 | Batwara 1947 | Tanvir Mirza / Tanno | Hindi | |

=== Television ===
| Year | Title | Role | Language | Ref. |
|---|---|---|---|---|
| 2024 | Waack Girls | Parinita | Hindi | |
| 2025 | Mrs. Deshpande | Young Seema Deshpande | Hindi | |

== Awards ==
| Year | Award | Category | Nominated work | Result | Ref. |
|---|---|---|---|---|---|
| 2022 | 7th Filmfare Awards Marathi | Best Child Actor | Ved | Won | |
| 2023 | Zee Chitra Gaurav Puraskar | Best Child Artiste | Ved | Won | |
