= Aapdi Thaapdi =

2022 Indian film

- Theatrical release poster
- Directed by: Anand Arun Karir
- Written by: Anand Arun Karir
- Story by: Sunila Anand Karir; Anand Arun Karir
- Starring: Shreyas Talpade; Mukta Barve; Sandeep Pathak; Navin Prabhakar; Nandu Madhav
- Cinematography: Suman Sahu
- Edited by: Vaibhav Parab
- Music by: Anand Bhaskar; Hasn; Rohan-Vinayak
- Production company: K Silent Productions
- Release date: 5 October 2022
- Country: India
- Language: Marathi

Aapdi Thaapdi is a 2022 Indian Marathi-language drama film written and directed by Anand Karir. It stars Shreyas Talpade, Mukta Barve, Sandeep Pathak and Navin Prabhakar and was released theatrically on 5 October 2022.

== Plot ==
The story is about friendship between a girl and a goat, revolving around Sakharam Patil (Shreyas Talpade), a very miserly but intelligent farmer living in a village, his wife Parvati (Mukta Barve), daughter Tulshi (Khushi Hazare) and his friend Sandeep Pathak (Damu) who lives in the house.

== Cast ==
- Shreyas Talpade as Sakharam Patil
- Mukta Barve as Parvati Patil
- Khushi Hajare as Tulshi aka Mau
- Sandeep Pathak as Damu
- Navin Prabhakar as Yuvraj Bhosale
- Nandu Madhav
- Aman Gupta
- Anup Kendre

== Production ==
The film was announced and principal photography of the film started in January 2022.

== Soundtrack ==
Aapdi Thaapdi

Soundtrack album by Anand Bhaskar
- Released: 2022
- Recorded: 2022
- Genre: Feature film soundtrack
- Length: 10:13
- Language: Marathi

Official audio
- Aapdi Thaapdi – Full Album on YouTube

Track listing
No.	Title	Singer(s)	Length
1.	"Apadi Thapadi title"	Anand Bhaskar	4:28
2.	"Ayushya Hey"	Abhay Jodpurkar	3:50
3.	"Ludbud Karto"	Swara Joshi	2:35
Total length:			10:13

== Reception ==
=== Critical response ===
Aapdi Thaapdi received positive reviews from critics. Anub George of The Times of India gave the film three and a half stars out of five and was appreciative of all major aspects of production, opining that it "'Aapdi Thaapdi' feels like a warm hug. It is a simple story of simple people that ends up teaching the audience several small lessons". Jaideep Phatak of Maharashtra Times also gave it three stars out of five and similarly found that "if you look at it through a different lens, savor it, it gives you the satisfaction of seeing something different." Reshma Raikwar of Loksatta felt the film was "A small story, a small incident explains a big story in life. Similarly, the film 'Apadi Thapdi' directed by Anand Karir should be mentioned as a film that gives a somewhat pure experience."
