= Mukta Barve =

Indian actress (born 1979)

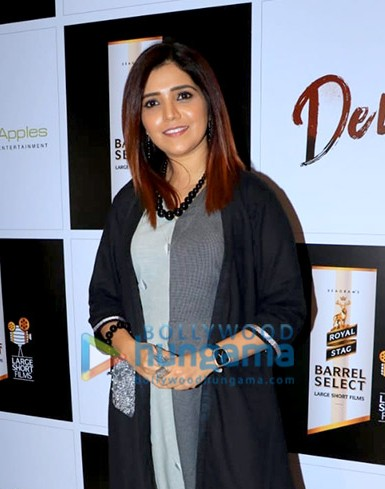
- Barve at the special screening of the short film Devi in 2020
- Born: 17 May 1979 (age 47); Chinchwad, Maharashtra, India
- Education: Savitribai Phule Pune University
- Occupations: Actress; producer; presenter
- Years active: 1999–present
- Awards: Full list

Signature
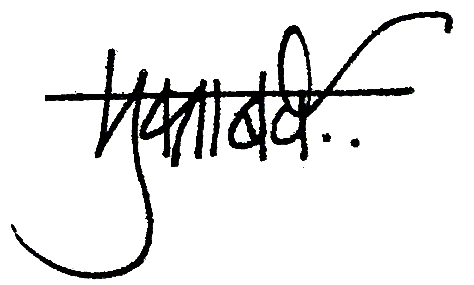

Mukta Barve (pronounced [mʊkt̪a bərʋeː]; Marathi:) is an Indian film, television, and theatre actress and a producer. One of the most popular Marathi celebrities, she has established a career in Marathi films. She is a recipient of seven Maharashtra State Film Awards one for Best Debut and other six for Best Actress in different plays and films.

In 1998, she made her debut to Marathi television with the show Ghadlay Bighadlay. She made her debut in Marathi theatre with Aamhala Vegle Vhayache (2001), a Marathi play. In 2002, she debuted into Marathi films with Chakwa. Her work was appreciated in the films Thang (2006), Maati Maay (2007), Sawar Re (2007), Saas Bahu Aur Sensex (2008), Sumbaran (2009) and Ek Daav Dhobi Pachhad (2009). The 2009 film, Jogwa became a turning point in her career, giving her back-to-back hit films: Mumbai-Pune-Mumbai (2010), Aaghaat (2009), Badam Rani Gulam Chor (2012), Lagna Pahave Karun (2013), Mangalashtak Once More (2013), Double Seat (2015) and Mumbai-Pune-Mumbai 2 (2015). The shows Agnihotra (2009–2010) and Eka Lagnachi Dusri Goshta (2012) are an important part of her television career. In her theatre career, Final Draft (2005), Dehbhaan (2005), Kabaddi Kabaddi (2008) and Chhapa Kata (2013) are some of her famous plays. In 2015, she became a part of three successful films which include Highway, Double Seat and Mumbai-Pune-Mumbai 2. In 2016, she appeared in two Marathi films YZ and Ganvesh.

Barve also owns a production house named Rasika Productions, under which she has produced the plays: Chhapa Kata, Lovebirds (2015) and Indira (2015), a theatre-based poetry programme, Rang Nava, in which she presents some poetry of her own and some of the others. Currently, she is acting and producing a play named CodeMantra (2016) under the banner of Rasika Productions.

== Life and family ==
Mukta Barve was born 17 May 1979 in Chinchwad near Pune, Maharashtra, India. Her father worked at a telecom company and her mother was a school teacher. She also has a brother, Debu Barve who is a commercial artist. In her school, she participated in many plays. After completing her Standard 10, Barve decided to take up acting as her profession. Barve completed her 11 and 12th standard from Sir Parshurambhau College, Pune. Later, she graduated from Savitribai Phule Pune University in Theatre and earned a bachelor's degree with Drama from Lalit Kala Kendra. Barve has admitted to being socially awkward as a child and did not have many friends. Later, she moved to Mumbai to focus completely on her acting career and stayed at a girls hostel in Kurla.

== Acting career ==
=== 1999-2007: Television, film and theatre debut ===
Barve had her first acting role in the play Ghar Tighancha Hava, just after having completed school. Later, when she moved to Mumbai, she got her first commercial play, Suyog's Aamhala Vegle Vhayache in 2001. She made her debut in Marathi television in 1998 with the TV series Ghadlay Bighadlay, in which she played the character named Champa in rural style. She later played small roles in TV series such as Pimpalpan (1998), Bandhan (1998), Buwa Aala (1999), Chitta Chor (1999), Me Ek Bandu (1999), Aabhalmaya (1999), Shriyut Gangadhar Tipre (2001) and Indradhanush (2003). In 2004, she made her debut in the Marathi film industry with the film Chakwa, for which she received the Maharashtra State Film Awards for Most Promising Newcomer of the year. In 2005, Barve played a cameo role in Amol Palekar's bilingual film Thang and also worked in the commercial plays Dehbhaan and Final Draft. In Final Draft she played a student who is unable to grasp what the professor teaches at the academy. For Dehbhaan, she received the award of Most Promising Newcomer of the year at the Alpha Gaurav Puraskar 2003 and award of Best Supporting Actress of the year at Alpha Gaurav Puraskar 2005 for the play Final Draft. Also, Barve was honoured with the awards of Best Actress in the Experimental Theatre of the year at Alpha Gaurav Puraskar 2005, Best Actress in Commercial Play of the year at Maharashtra Times Awards 2006 and Best Actress in Commercial Play of the year at Zee Gaurav Puraskar 2008.

Barve next played cameo roles in the films Shevri (2006), Blind Game (2006) and Maati Maay (2006). In 2006, Barve worked in the Marathi TV series Agnishikha, in which she played the title role. Also in the same year, she did the commercial play Hum To Tere Aashiq Hain, in which she played a Muslim girl, Ruksana Saahil, who falls for a Hindu man Anil Pradhan (played by Jitendra Joshi) and marries him. For her work in the play, she received the Maharashtra State Film Award for Best Actress in a Commercial Play. Barve's next release was Sawar Re (2007), in which she played Mukta. Barve's next commercial play was Jitendra Patil's debut play Kabaddi Kabaddi, in which she played a girl who wants to be a Kabaddi champion like her ostracised uncle, but her father (played by Vinay Apte) wants her to settle down like his other daughters in the United States. For her work in the play Kabaddi Kabaddi, she was given the award for Best Actress in a Commercial Play at the Zee Gaurav Puraskar (2008), Maharashtra Times Awards (2007) and Maharashtra State Film Awards (2007).

=== 2008-2011: Jogwa and success ===
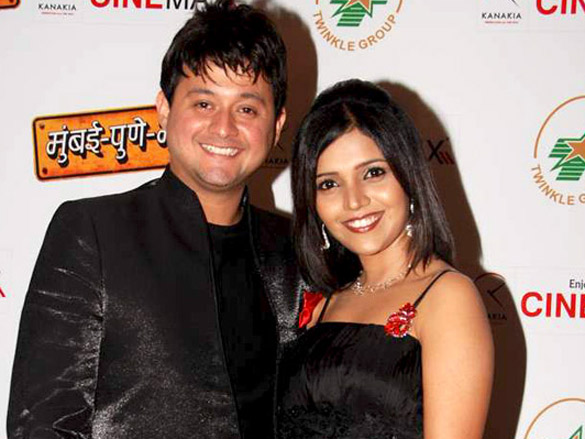
Barve with co-star Swwapnil Joshi at premiere of Marathi film Mumbai-Pune-Mumbai

In 2008, Barve made a special appearance in the film De Dhakka and played a cameo role of Parimal Bhosle in the Hindi film Saas Bahu Aur Sensex. Saas Bahu Aur Sensex grossed ₹2.7 million (US$29,000) domestically. In 2009, Barve featured in the Ashok Saraf's producer debut Ek Daav Dhobi Pachhad (2009), a comedy romance in the role of Sulakshana, who has feelings for her father's enemy's son and lies to her father that she is pregnant in order to visit the U.S. Her next appearance was in Gajendra Ahire's film Sumbaran (2009), in which she played a Dhangar girl named Kalyani. Barve's final appearance of 2010 was opposite Upendra Limaye in the National Award winning film Jogwa, dealing with religious superstitions in rural India. She played Suli, a Jogtin, a happy and innocent girl who is forced into a lifetime of servitude to the local deity, who enters a relationship with Tayappa, a forced eunuch. To prepare for the role, Barve studied the life of a Jogtin through photographs and by observing day-to-day rural behaviour. For this portrayal, Barve won the awards for Best Actress at Maharashtra State Film Awards (2009) and at Marathi International Film and Theatre Awards (2010). In 2009, Barve was honoured by the Sangeet Natak Akademi with the Ustad Bismillah Khan Yuva Puraskar for achievement in Marathi theatre.

Barve's next release was the Bollywood film Thanks Maa (2010); she played a cameo role of Lakshmi, a prostitute. Taran Adarsh of entertainment portal of Bollywood Hungama wrote of her performance, "Mukta Barve; effective". Thanks Maa grossed ₹1.1 million (US$12,000) domestically. In 2010, Barve also starred in Satish Rajwade's romantic film Mumbai-Pune-Mumbai, opposite Swwapnil Joshi. Her character was a girl based in Mumbai, going to Pune and lands up meeting Joshi's character. The chemistry between Barve and Swwapnil Joshi was compared with that of Bollywood's actors Kajol and Shah Rukh Khan. Her next appearance was in the TV show Agnihotra (2010), in which she played Manjula Shripad Agnihotri. Her next release was Aika Dajiba (2010), where she played Sharu, a girl who falls for a Gujarati grocer's son in the village. Barve next featured in Vikram Gokhale's directorial debut, Aaghaat (2010) as Dr. Smita Deshmukh. For this, Barve won the award for Best Actress at the Pune International Film Festival (2011). In 2010, she also played Adv. Meera Patwardhan in the TV show Lajja, alongside Girija Oak and Piyush Ranade. At the Raja Paranjape Film Festival 2011, she was honoured with the Tarunai Sanmaan Award for her contribution to the Marathi film industry. In 2011, she featured in an episode of the Marathi show Madhu Ethe Ani Chandra Tithe, opposite Swwapnil Joshi. In the episode, she played Gauri, a village belle who is married to a city boy, Siddhanth (played by Swwapnil Joshi).

=== 2012-2014: ELDG and other films ===
Barve's next appearance was opposite Swwapnil Joshi in Satish Rajwade's TV show Eka Lagnachi Dusri Goshta (popularly known as ELDG) (2012). She portrayed the character of Radha Desai, an artist working in an ad agency who does contract marriage with Joshi's character due to parental pressure. Her portrayal was highly appreciated by the audiences. The show received great applause and high TRPs because of the love story between the protagonists - Radha and Ghanshyam. In 2012, Barve worked in Satish Rajwade's Badam Rani Gulam Chor, an adaptation of the Marathi play Makadachya Hati Champagne, alongside Upendra Limaye, Pushkar Shrotri and Anand Ingale. This film was Barve's second venture with actor Upendra Limaye after Jogwa. Barve played Pencil in the film, her character was named according to its characteristics. The Times of India wrote of her performance, "Mukta Barve (Pencil) has done a fantastic job. Mukta has shown 'Pencil's' bold attitude flawlessly". In 2012, Barve also featured in the film, Gola Berij, an adaptation of the Marathi book with the same title. She played a cameo role of Nandini Chaubal in the film. The film also had a cast of senior actors like Prashant Damle, Mohan Agashe, Subodh Bhave to name a few.

In 2013, Barve visited Toronto for the show of her critically acclaimed play Final Draft, along with her co-star Girish Joshi. In 2013, Barve worked in two back-to-back hit films, becoming one of the top performers of the year. In 2013, Barve worked in her self-produced commercial play Chhapa Kata, alongside Reema Lagoo, later Lagoo was replaced by Neena Kulkarni. Barve played Maitreyi Bhagwat, who runs a boutique to support the family, and lives a life where she has suppressed all her desires to be able to take care of her mother. For the play Chhapa Kata, Barve won the awards for Best Play at Deenanath Mangeshkar Awards (2014) and the awards for Best Play and Best Actress at Sanskruti Kaladarpan Awards (2014). Ajay Naik's directorial debut, a romantic musical love story, Lagna Pahave Karun was Barve's next film release. Co-starring Umesh Kamat, Siddharth Chandekar and Tejashree Pradhan Ketkar, Barve was cast as Aditi Tilak, a wedding planner who wants to start her own marriage bureau. Indian Nerve reviewed her performance as: "Performance wise, Mukta as a strong and determined Aditi who is scared of failing is the best character of them all. She pulled off the role very aptly." Her next appearance in 2013, was opposite Swwapnil Joshi and alongside Sai Tamhankar and Kadambari Kadam in Renu Desai's Mangalashtak Once More . She played the character Aarti Pathak, romantic, shy girl who surrenders to love. The Times of India reviewed her performance as "Mukta too excels with her comic timing and dialogue delivery". In 2014, she acted in a Konkani film, Gunaaji in the role of a shepherd alongside Upendra Limaye. In 2014, she also acted in a short film, Shot, directed by Ratnakar Matkari.

=== 2015-present: Films and television comeback ===
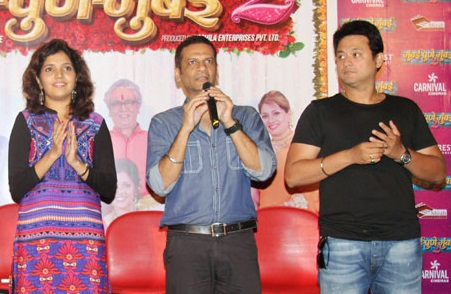
Barve with Satish Rajwade (center) and Swapnil Joshi at MPM 2 Trailer Launch

In 2015, she worked opposite Ankush Chaudhari in Sameer Vidwans' Double Seat. Barve was cast as Manjiri Naik, an insurance agent and a straightforward, middle-class Maharashtrian girl. The Times of India reviewed her performance as "Mukta, who too makes a return after two years, is brilliant as ever as the strong-willed, caring and accommodative wife". For her work in the film, she bagged the awards for Best Actress at Maharashtracha Favourite Kon 2015 and at Zee Chitra Gaurav 2016. Barve also bagged the most prestigious Maharashtra State Film Award for Best Actress in 2016, she received a nomination for Best Actress award at Sanskruti Kala Darpan 2016 and she also bagged the award for Best Actress in a Lead Role at Marathi Filmfare Awards 2016 for her work in Double Seat. Barve's next release was Amit Trivedi's road drama film, Highway, alongside many actors where she played a sex worker. Her next appearance was in her self-produced commercial play Lovebirds, in which she played a character with many grey shades who is a housewife, Devika. Her final release of 2015 was opposite Swwapnil Joshi in Mumbai-Pune-Mumbai 2, the sequel of the hit film Mumbai-Pune-Mumbai, in which she reprised her role from the first part, Gauri Deshpande a bad tempered and confused girl to be dealt with. For her work in Mumbai-Pune-Mumbai 2, Barve received positive reviews from the critics as well as the viewers. For her work in the film, she earned a nomination for the award of Best Actress in a Lead Role at Marathi Filmfare Awards 2016.

In 2016, she was honoured with the Lokmat Maharashtrian of the Year Award in Theatre category for her work in Marathi theatre. In July 2016, she was honoured with the Chaturastra Abhinetri Award at Nilu Phule Sanman 2016. In 2016, Barve appeared in Atul Jagdale's Ganvesh, co-starring Kishor Kadam, Dilip Prabhavalkar, Smita Tambe, Guru Thakur and many more in which she played a tough police inspector, Meera Patil, who is torn between following her duty to respect the khaki uniform and following her seniors' orders. The Times of India wrote of her performance in Ganvesh, "Barve (who is an absolute pleasure to watch) delivers her usual balanced performance. In 2016, she acted in and produced a play titled Codemantra, an engaging courtroom drama set up against the background of the Indian Army under the banner of Rasika Productions. In this play, Barve played Ahilya Deshmukh, a military law expert. Through this play, Barve won many honours which include Most Natural Performer of the Year and Special Recognition Play at Zee Natya Gaurav 2017, Best Play at Maharashtra Times Sanman Awards 2017 and Best Play and Best Actress at Sanskruti Kaladarpan Awards 2017. In mid 2016, Barve featured in Sameer Vidwans' YZ, alongside Sai Tamhankar and others. The Times of India wrote of her performance in the film as " In a small role too, Mukta drives the point home with her expressions." In November 2016, she was honoured with the Tarunai Sanman Puraskar at Pulotsav 2016. In 2017, Barve, under her own production house, produced five shows of the iconic play Sakharam Binder, specially for her backstage people. Barve also acted in the play along with some other actors of Lalit Kala Kendra, wherein she played the lead role of Champa. In December 2016, Barve signed for Vikram Phadnis' directorial debut film, Hrudayantar, opposite Subodh Bhave, which released on 9 July 2017 under the banner of Vikram Phadnis Productions. The Times of India wrote about Barve's performance in the film as "Mukta, as always, is brilliant". For the film Barve also received nomination in Marathi Filmfare Awards for Best Actor in a Leading Role (Female).

As of August 2017, she has started featuring in a Marathi television show named Rudram, a thriller which airs on Zee Yuva as Ragini, a woman exacting her revenge on many people. She is seen alongside many popular Marathi artists like Satish Rajwade, Mohan Agashe, Sandeep Pathak, Kiran Karmarkar and Vandana Gupte. In February 2018, she acted in Pratima Joshi's directorial debut Aamhi Doghi, alongside Priya Bapat. The Times of India reviewed her performance as "Mukta lends authenticity to Amala with her restrained portrayal and makes you feel for her". In March 2018, she was honored with the Loksatta Tarun Tejankit award in the film category. She was seen opposite Swapnil Joshi in December 2018 in the film Mumbai-Pune-Mumbai 3 which is the sequel of Mumbai-Pune-Mumbai 2. The film released on 7 December 2018. Her performance in the film was reviewed by The Times of India as "For Mukta, this is a cakewalk, but she gives it her all. Nothing seems forced in her portrayal". In the year 2019 Barve acted in three films. Firstly she was seen in Saleel Kulkarni's directorial debut Wedding Cha Shinema alongside Rucha Inamdar, Shivaraj Vaychal and others. She played the role of Urvi, an aspiring filmmaker, who wants to make films on serious topics. Ibrahim Afghan from The Times of India reviewed her performance in the film as "Mukta, has performed sincerely and does well in her role". Subsequently, she acted in the film Bandishala directed by Milind Lele alongside Sharad Ponkshe, Pravin Tarde and many others. In the film she played the role of Madhavi Sawant, a tough police officer, who incurs the wrath of several powerful enemies who plan to get rid of her. Her performance was critically acclaimed as "The whole responsibility of taking the story forward lies on the shoulders of Mukta, who handles it like a pro." For the film Barve bagged Best actress title at Maharashtra State Film Awards 2019. Her third film in the year was Vikram Phadnis' Smile Please wherein she played the role of Nandini Joshi, a photographer, who is diagnosed with an early-onset dementia, to find sense of purpose and dignity opposite Lalit Prabhakar and Prasad Oak. Mihir Bhanage from The Times of India wrote about her performance "Mukta portrays the strong-headedness and vulnerability of Nandini with aplomb".

Mukta Barve starred in a short film called Devi, which showcased the lives of nine women belonging to different societal backgrounds, who were forced to form a bond due to their circumstances. The film depicted their struggles with abuse and how they came together to share their stories. Mukta's co-stars in the film included Neha Dhupia, Neena Kulkarni, Shivani Raghuvanshi, Yashaswini Dayama, Sandhya Mhatre, and Rama Joshi. In 2022, Mukta Barve starred in the Marathi-language thriller film Y, directed by Ajit Suryakant Wadikar and written by Swapneel Sojwal and Ajit Wadikar. The movie also features Nandu Madhav, Prajakta Mali, Omkar Govardhan, Sandeep Pathak, Rohit Kokate, and Suhas Sirsath. Mukta Barve starred in the Indian Marathi-language drama film Aapdi Thaapdi, written and directed by Anand Karir. She costarred Shreyas Talpade, Sandeep Pathak, Navin Prabhakar, and Khushi Hazare in the film. Mukta's character, Parvati, is married to the protagonist, Sakharam Patil (played by Shreyas Talpade), a farmer who develops a unique friendship with a goat.

== Production and other work ==
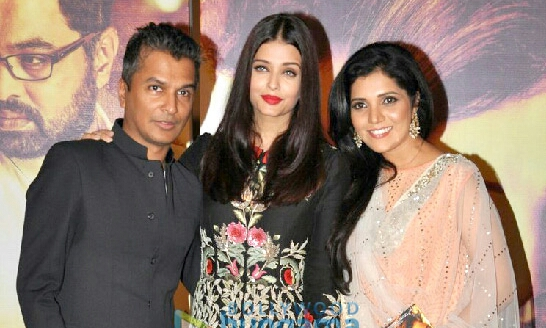
Barve with Aishwarya Rai Bachchan and Vikram Phadnis at music launch of Hrudayantar

In the same year, 2010, Barve hosted Amhi Marathi Pora Hushar, a game show. In 2012, Barve hosted Zee Gaurav Puraskar, alongside Swwapnil Joshi. In 2012, she also became the brand ambassador of Suyog Group along with Swwapnil Joshi. In 2013, Barve turned producer with her own production house named after her friend Rasika Joshi. In 2014, Barve produced a poetry based theatre program, Rang Nava, with composer Milind Joshi, in the program, Barve also recited her own written poetry. Along with Rang Nava, she has also produced two plays Chhapa Kata and Lovebirds, in which she has also acted. On 7 December 2014, the first death anniversary of Vinay Apte, Barve wrote an article reviving memories of Apte for the Marathi daily newspaper, Loksatta. In 2014, she performed a scene from her play Kabaddi Kabaddi in the TV special program Vinay Ek Vadal. In 2015, she became a judge for 9X Jhakaas' Jhakaas Heroine (season 2). In 2015, she produced one more play, Indira under Rasika Productions, her production house. In 2015, Barve, along with some other actors, took initiative in an expedition, "Pakshi Vachva" started by the NGO Animals Matter To Me, for the protection of birds. Barve has written a poetry named "Shodh", which was published by Loksatta on 8 February 2016. Barve recently inaugurated a special two-day seminar Badalta Maharashtra, organised by the Marathi daily Loksatta International Women Day, 8 March 2016. She also shared her thoughts about the importance of women in Maharashtra in the special segment Karti Karviti of the same seminar inaugurated by her. Due to the demonetisation of Rs. 500 and Rs. 1000 notes in India, theatre enthusiasts were not able to pay for and watch shows as the new notes of Rs. 500 and Rs. 2000 had just started to print. As a producer, Barve installed credit card and online payment systems for her theatre shows. In October 2016, Barve produced a yet another Marathi play, Deepsthamb under the banner of Rasika Productions and in association with Anamika Productions. In 2017, Barve turned into a radio jockey with a radio show named The Mukta Barve Show, which is a women-centric show and focuses on the issues faced by women. The income which Barve earns from the shows of her play CodeMantra is given to the Indian army's welfare fund. In August 2017, Barve posted photographs of unclean toilets at Pune Municipal Corporation-run Yashwantrao Chavan Sabhagurha and blamed the PMC for it, the civic body has finally woke up to the complaint by saying, that it will clean the toilets at its auditoriums every day.

== Filmography ==
Note: Unless otherwise noted, below works are in Marathi language.

=== Films ===
Key
†	Denotes films that have not yet been released

Year	Film	Role	Notes	Ref(s)
2004	Chakwa	Chhaya	Debut film	
2005	Thang	Unnamed	Bilingual film	
2006	Shevri	Unnamed	Cameo appearance	
2006	Blind Game	Detective	Supporting role	
2006	Maati Maay	Yashoda	Supporting role	
2007	Sawar Re	Mukta	Supporting role	
2008	De Dhakka	Unnamed	Dancer in a song	
2008	Saas Bahu Aur Sensex	Parimal G. Bhosle	Cameo appearance, Hindi film	
2009	Ek Daav Dhobi Pachhad	Sulakshana	Supporting role	
2009	Sumbaran	Kalyani (Kalli)	Supporting role	
2009	Jogwa	Suli	Lead role	
2009	Topi Ghala Re	Mukta	Supporting role	
2010	Thanks Maa	Lakshmi - the prostitute	Cameo appearance, Hindi film	
2010	Mumbai-Pune-Mumbai	Mumbai	Lead role	
2010	Aika Dajiba	Sharu	Supporting role	
2010	Aaghaat	Dr. Smita Deshmukh	Pune International Film Festival award	
2012	Badam Rani Gulam Chor	Pencil	Lead role	
2012	Gola Berij	Nandini Chaubal	Supporting role	
2013	Lagna Pahave Karun	Aditi Tilak	Lead role	
2013	Mangalashtak Once More	Aarti Pathak	Lead role	
2014	Gunaaji	Shepherd	Lead role, Konkani film	
2014	Shot	Shruti	Short film	
2015	Double Seat	Manjiri Naik	Lead role	
2015	Highway	Sex worker	Supporting role	
2015	Mumbai-Pune-Mumbai 2	Gauri Ashok Deshpande	Lead role	
2016	Ganvesh	Inspector Meera Patil	Lead role	
2016	YZ	Sayali	Supporting role	
2017	Hrudayantar	Samaira Joshi	Released	
2017	22 June	Malti	Released	
2018	Aamhi Doghi	Amla Sardesai	Released	
2018	Mumbai Pune Mumbai 3	Gauri Pradhan	Released	
2018	Ranangan	Kavita Sabnis	Cameo	
2019	Wedding Cha Shinema	Urvi	Released	
2019	Bandishala	Madhavi Sawant	State Film Award	
2019	Smile Please	Nandini	Released	
2020	Devi	Arzu	Short film	
2022	Ekda Kaay Zala	Dr. Saniya	Supporting role	
2022	Y	Dr. Aarti Deshmukh	Lead role	
2022	Aapdi Thaapdi	Parvati Patil		
2024	Alibaba Aani Chalishitale Chor	Sumitra		
2024	Nach Ga Ghuma	Rani		
2024	Raavsaheb			
2025	Asambhav	Mansi / Urmila		
2025	Aananddoh †	TBA		

=== Television ===
Year	Show	Role	Notes	Ref(s)
1999	Ghadlay Bighadlay	Champa	Debut Show	
1999	Pimpal Paan		Supporting role	
1999	Bandhan	Rupashri	Supporting role	
1999	Buwa Aale		Supporting role	
1999	Chitta Chor		Supporting role	
1999	Me Ek Bandu		Supporting role	
1999	Aabhalmaya	Varsha Nimkar	Supporting role	
2001	Shriyut Gangadhar Tipre	Yogita	Supporting role	
2003	Indradhanushya		Supporting role	
2006	Agnishikha	Kalika	Lead role	
2009-10	Agnihotra	Manjula Shripad Agnihotri	Lead role	
2008	Aamhi Marathi Pora Hushar	Host	Game show	
2010-11	Lajja	Adv. Meera Patwardhan	Supporting role	
2010-11	Madhu Ethe An Chandra Tithe	Gauri	Episodic role	
2012	Zee Gaurav Puraskar	Host	TV awards	
2012	Eka Lagnachi Dusri Goshta	Radha Desai-Kale	Lead role	
2014	Vinay Ek Vadal	Performer	TV special	
2015	Jhakaas Heroine (season 2)	Judge	Reality show	
2017	Rudram	Ragini Desai	Thriller show	
2021–2022	Ajunahi Barsaat Aahe	Meera Desai-Pathak	Lead role	

=== Theatre ===
Year	Play	Role	Notes	Ref(s)
1996	Ghar Tighancha Asava		Debut play	
2001	Aamhala Vegle Vhayache		Supporting role	
2005	Dehbhaan		Supporting role	
2005	Final Draft	Student	Lead role	
2006	Hum To Tere Aashiq Hain	Ruksana Saahil	Lead role	
2008	Kabaddi Kabaddi	Purva	Lead role	
2013	Chhapa Kata	Maitreyi Bhagwat	Lead role and producer	
2014	Rang Nava	—N/a	Poetry based theatre program, Producer	
2015	Lovebirds	Devika	Lead role and producer	
2015	Indira	—N/a	Producer	
2016	Codemantra	Ahilya Deshmukh	Lead role and Producer	
2016	Deepsthamb	—N/a	Producer	
2017	Sakharam Binder	Champa	Producer	
2017	Dhai Akshar Prem Ke	—N/a	Producer	
2018	Challenge	—N/a	Producer	
2022	Priya Bhai, Ek Kavita Havi Aahe	Sunitabaai	Lead role	
2022	Charchaughi	Vidya	Lead role	

=== Radio ===
Year	Show	Role	Notes	Ref(s)
2017	The Mukta Barve Show	Radio Jockey	Debut as RJ	
