= List of Marathi films of 2013 =

A list of films produced by the Marathi language film industry based in Maharashtra in the year 2013.

== Box office collection ==
Rank	Film	Director	Studio (s)	Worldwide gross	Ref.
1	Duniyadari	Sanjay Jadhav	Dreaming 24/7 Productions	₹32 crore	
2	Balak-Palak	Ravi Jadhav	Mumbai Film Company	₹12 crore	
3	Zapatlela 2	Mahesh Kothare	Kothare and Kothare Vision; Viacom 18 Motion Pictures	₹12 crore	

== January – March ==
Month	Opening	Title	Director	Cast	Genre	Source
J A N	4	Balak-Palak	Ravi Jadhav	Prathamesh Parab, Shashwati Pimplikar, Madan Devdhar, Kishor Kadam	Drama	
J A N	4	Gadya Aapla Gaon Bara	Dharmanand Vernekar	Makarand Anaspure, Sayaji Shinde, Mohan Agashe, Savita Malpekar, Shilpa Anaspure	Drama	
J A N	11	Ajinkya	Tejas Deoskar	Sandeep Kulkarni, Kadambari Kadam, Sarika Nilatkar	Drama	
J A N	11	Kutha Bolu Naka	Ashok Karlekar, Rajan Prabhu	Prasad Oak, Lata Andhare, Anjali Khantval, Dipak Shirke, Vijay Gokhale, Kishor Nandalaskar, Suhashini Deshpande, Rajan Prabhu, Kiran Ronge, Santosh Satav, Megha Pathak, Anil Nagarkar	Romance	
J A N	18	Bhootachi Shala	Ramesh Namdeo Shirke	Atul Todankar, Bhushan Kadu, Prashant Nigde	Drama	
J A N	18	Ek Aas Antarichee	Darshan Lolienkar	Suneel Pednekar, Sonam Morajkar, Uday Salkar	Drama	
J A N	18	Hou De Jarasa Ushir	Wasim Maner	Aditi Sarangdhar, Sadashiv Amrapurkar, Aishwarya Narkar, Sharvari Jamenis, Chinmay Mandlekar	Drama	
J A N	18	Pune 52	Nikhil Mahajan	Girish Kulkarni, Sonali Kulkarni, Sai Tamhankar	Thriller	
F E B	1	Premachi Goshta	Satish Rajwade	Atul Kulkarni, Sagarika Ghatge, Rohini Hattangadi, Sulekha Talvalkar, Meera Welankar, Satish Rajwade, Ajay Purkar	Romance	
F E B	8	Ashach Eka Betavar	Sanjay Hinge	Sanjay Narvekar, Ankush Chaudhari, Madhura Velankar, Sai Tamhankar, Sanjay Mone, Yatin Karyekar, Mangesh Desai, Sharad Ponkshe, Kamlesh Sawant, Punam Jadhav	Suspense	
F E B	14	Jai Maharashtra Dhaba Bhatinda	Avadhoot Gupte	Abhijeet Khandkekar, Prarthana Behere, Vikram Gokhale, Puneet Issar, Priyadarshan Jadhav, Janhavi Prabhu-Arora, Avadhoot Gupte	Drama	
F E B	14	Love is Vaat	Rohaan Satghare	Amit Bhanushali, Vijay Chavan, Kranti Redkar	Comedy	
F E B	14	Sasubai Gelya Chorila	Dnyaneshwar Aangane	Vishakha Subhedar, Kuldeep Pawar, Arun Kadam, Girish Pardeshi, Amit Bhanushali, Ashlesha Patil, Tejaswi Patil	Comedy	
M A R	3	Dhating Dhingana	Mandar Devasthali	Ankush Choudhary, Prasad Oak, Aditi Sarangdhar, Neelam Shirke, Atul Parchure, Shweta Shinde, Anand Abhyankar, Digamber Naik, Arun Nalawade, Vandana Gupte, Uday Sabnis, Smita Talwalkar, Savita Malpekar	Comedy	
M A R	15	Aakant	Mansingh Pawar	Milind Shinde, Aditi Sarangdhar, Anvay Bendre, Deepa Chaphekar, Rajeet Govilkar, Santosh Bhosale, Gajanan Bhise, Arun Khandagale, Dilip Raj	Romance	
M A R	15	Tuhya Dharma Koncha?	Satish Manwar	Upendra Limaye, Vibhawari Deshpande, Suhas Palshikar, Ramesh Medhekar, Kishor Kadam	Drama	
M A R	29	Aajcha Divas Majha	Chandrakant Kulkarni	Sachin Khedekar, Ashwini Bhave, Mahesh Manjrekar, Rishikesh Joshi, Pushkar Shrotri, Anand Ingle	Drama	
M A R	29	Navra Maza Bhavra	Kamlakar Gujal	Dr. Nilesh Sable, Tamanna Nayar, Bhushan Kadu, Pradeep Patwardhan, Vijay Chavan, Kishori Ambiye, Kirti Chaudhary, Deepa Chaphekar, Satish Taare, Viju Khote, Mrunmayee Deshpande, Girija Oak, Aditi Sarangdhar	Comedy	

== April – June ==
Month	Opening	Title	Director	Cast	Genre	Source
A P R	5	Dankyavar Danka	Kanchan Nayak	Makarand Anaspure, Suvarna Kale, Vijay Patkar, Ashwini Ekbote, Pravin Tarade, Prakash Dhotre, Mukta Patwardhan	Comedy	
A P R	5	Sanshay kallol	Vishal Inamdar	Ankush Choudhary, Pushkar Shrotri, Gauri Nigudkar, Mrunmayee Deshpande, Sanjay Khapre, Omkar Govardhan, Kshitee Jog, Reema Lagoo, Vijay Patwardhan, Sulekha Talvalkar	Comedy	
A P R	12	Parees	Ramesh Saalgaonkar	Umesh Kamat, Kishor Kadam, Vijay Chavhan, Arun Nalawade, Nisha Parulekar, Uday Sabanis, Pradip Patvardhan, Siddhesh Prabhakar, Vivek Chabukswar, Indrajeet More, Hrishikesh Shelar	Drama	
A P R	19	Chintoo 2	Shrirang Godbole		Children / Thriller	
A P R	19	Kurukshetra	Milind Lele	Mahesh Manjrekar, Sharad Pongse, Shweta Salve	Drama	
A P R	19	Prem Mhanje Prem Mhanje Prem Asta	Mrinal Kulkarni	Mrinal Kulkarni, Sachin Khedekar, Pallavi Joshi, Sunil Barve, Suhas Joshi, Mohan Agashe, Smita Talwalkar, Neha Joshi, Siddharth Chandekar	Romance	
A P R	19	Touring Talkies	Gajendra Ahire	Subodh Bhave, Trupti Bhoir, Kishor Kadam, Suhas Palshikar, Milind Shinde, Vaibhav Mangale, Neha Pendse, Chinmay Sant	Drama	
A P R	19	Yeda	Kishore Belekar	Ashutosh Rana, Kishori Shahane Vij, Satish Pulekar, Reema Lagoo, Aniket Vishwasrao, Pradhyna Shastri	Thriller	
A P R	22	Khel Tamasha	Ashish Pujari	Teja Devkar, Sanjay Khapre, Milind Shinde, Prakash Dhotre, Rohit Chavan, Sanjay Mohite, Prashant Tapaswi, Varsha Ghatpande, Milind Oak, Suresh Vishwakarma, Chinmay Kulkarni, Praful Kamble	Drama	
A P R	26	We are On - Houn Jau de	Amol Palekar, Sandhya Gokhale	Ashok Saraf, Nivedita Saraf, Vandana Gupte, Dilip Prabhawalkar, Makarand Anaspure, Manoj Joshi, Satish Alekar, Ajit Kelkar, Satish Pulekar, Upendra Limaye, Pushkar Shrotri, Anand Ingale, Ramesh Bhatkar, Shreeram Pendse, Gautam Joglekar, Sandeep Pathak	Drama	
A P R	26	Lek Laadki	Yashwant Bhalkar	Prateeksha Lonkar, Mohan Joshi, Milind Gunaji, Umesh Kamat, Priyanka Yadav, Swapnil Rajshekhar, Supriya Karnik, Ashalata Wabgaonkar, Suhasini Deshpande	Family	
M A Y	3	Tendalya Nighala Oscarla	Dr. Shashikant Doiphode	Vinod Revale, Disha Pardeshi, Shraddha Sangavkar, Devendra Ghavre, Saroj Rao, Suyash Gajanand, Sachin Bidwai, Rajesh Choudhary, Nilesh Konde, Yashodhan Mavlankar, Prashant Satardekar	Comedy	
M A Y	10	Kasa Kai Mama, Bara Hai Kaa			Family	
M A Y	10	Kokanastha-Taath Kana Haach Baana	Mahesh Manjrekar	Sachin Khedekar, Medha Manjrekar, Upendra Limaye, Jitendra Joshi, Sonali Kulkarni, Vaibhav Mangle, Savita Malpekar, Priya Bapat	Drama	
M A Y	17	Ashi Hoti Sant Sakhu	Subhash Sharma	Nisha Parulekar, Subha Deshpande	Epic	
M A Y	17	Taani	Sanjeev Kolte	Ketaki Mategaonkar, Arun Nalawade, Vatsala Polkamvar Ambone, Dr. Vilas Ujavne, Devendra Dodke, Madan Gadkari	Family	
M A Y	17	Tifan - Ek Kinchali	Kailash Mali	Aniket Kelkar, Vilas Ujavne, Prajakta, Shivaji Shinde	Drama	
M A Y	24	Ekulti Ek	Sachin	Sachin, Shriya Pilgaonkar, Supriya Pilgaonkar, Siddharth Menon, Ashok Saraf, Kishori Shahane, Nirmiti Sawant	Family	
M A Y	24	Kalakaar	Sakar Raut	Bhushan Pradhan, Amruta Deshmukh	Drama	
M A Y	31	Kho Kho	Kedar Shinde	Bharat Jadhav, Prajakta Mali, Vijay Chavan, Siddharth Jadhav, Kranti Redkar, Uday Tikekar	Comedy	
M A Y	31	Power	Vijay Rane	Nagesh Bhosle, Smita Shewale, Vijay Patkar, Pratiksha Jadhav, Uday Tikekar, Anant Jog, Shreyash Paranjpe, Seema Singh	Action / Drama	
J U N	7	Bhootacha Honeymoon	Raj Mohite	Bharat Jadhav, Ruchita Jadhav, Pratiksha Jadhav, Madhu Kambikar, Santosh Malekar	Drama	
J U N	7	Zapatlela 2	Mahesh Kothare	Adinath Kothare, Sonalee Kulkarni, Sai Tamhankar, Makarand Anaspure, Dilip Prabhavalkar	Comedy / Thriller	
J U N	14	Anumati	Gajendra Ahire	Vikram Gokhale, Reema Lagoo, Neena Kulkarni, Subodh Bhave, Anand Abhyankar, Sai Tamhankar, Kishor Kadam, Arun Nalavde, Rohan Mankani, Neha Pendse	Family	
J U N	14	Chaandi	Sameer Naik	Ramesh Deo, Vaibhav Mangale, Deepak Shirke	Comedy	
J U N	14	Chabu Palali Sasarla	Anil Surve	Ashok Shinde, Maithili Javkar, Prasad Oak, Vijay Patkar, Atul Parchure, Vijay Chavan, Viju Khote, Deepak Shirke, Shantanu Moghe, Shanshak Udharpurkar	Romance	
J U N	14	Yoddha	Prasad Inamdar	Saurabh Gokhale, Sharmishta Raut, Nagesh Bhosale, Priya Berde, Devendra Bhagat, Shivangi Valvekar, Anvay Bendre, Sunil Godbole, Poorva Barve, Atharva Kane	Action / Drama	
J U N	21	Premsutra	Tejas Deoskar	Sandeep Kulkarni, Pallavi Subhash, Lokesh Gupte, Shruthi Marathe, Shubha Khote, Shishir Sharma, Ila Bhat, Meenakshi Martins, Prasad Pandit	Romance	
J U N	28	Majhi Shaala	Shantanu Anant Tambe	Arun Nalawade, Alka Kubal, Akash Waghmode, Jayant Savarkar, Devendra Dodke, Deepjyoti, Ashok Pawade, Baban Joshi, Sanchit Yadav, Poornima Vawhal	Drama	

== July – September ==
Month	Opening	Title	Director	Cast	Genre	Source
J U L	19	Duniyadari	Sanjay Jadhav	Swapnil Joshi, Ankush Choudhary, Urmila Kanitkar, Sai Tamhankar, Sandeep Kulkarni, Varsha Usgaonkar, Jitendra Joshi, Sushant Shelar, Richa Pariyalli, Uday Tikekar, Uday Sabnis	Drama	
J U L	26	Shreemant Damodar Pant	Kedar Shinde	Bharat Jadhav, Vijay Chavan, Alka Kubal	Drama	
J U L	26	Time Please	Sameer Vidwans	Umesh Kamat, Priya Bapat, Siddharth Jadhav, Sai Tamhankar	Drama	
J U L	26	72 Mile - Ek Pravas	Rajiv Patil	Chinmay Sant, Smita Tambe, Shravani Solaskar, Chinmay Kambli, Esha Mane	Drama	
A U G	23	Popat	Satish Rajwade	Atul Kulkarni, Amey Wagh, Siddharth Menon	Comedy	
A U G	30	Sutradhar	Pratik Kadam	Chinmay Mandlekar, Vinay Apte, Alka Kubal-Athlye, Aditi Sarangdhar, Sushant Shelar, Purva Pawar, Aby Fizardo, Bhushan Ghadi, Nayan Jadhav, Poonam Jadhav, Sunil Deo, Pradeep Patwardhan, Kamlesh Sawant, Shekhar Phadke, Swapnil Jadhav, Janmejay Patil	Drama	
S E P	6	Jarab	Prakash Panchal, Ankush Choudhary	Ankush Choudhary, Sai Lokur	Action	
S E P	13	Sat Na Gat	Raju P	Bharat Jadhav, Pakhi Hegde, Manjarekar		
S E P	20	Investment	Ratnakar Matkari	Tushar Dalvi, Supriya Vinod, Sulbha Deshpande, Sanjay Mone, Sandeep Pathak, Praharsh Naik, Bhagyashri Pane, Parharsh Naik, Soham Kolvankar, Milind Pathak	Drama	
S E P	20	Narbachi Wadi	Aditya Ajay Sarpotdar	Dilip Prabhavalkar, Atul Parchure, Nitin Ratnaparakhi, Manoj Joshi, Manoj Patwardhan, Kishori Shahane	Drama	

== October – December ==
Month	Opening	Title	Director	Cast	Genre	Source
O C T	4	Lagna Pahave Karun	Ajay Naik	Mukta Barve, Umesh Kamat, Siddharth Chandekar, Tejashri Pradhan	Romance	
O C T	11	Samhita	Sumitra Bhave, Sunil Sukthankar	Milind Soman, Devika Daftardar, Rajeshwari Sachdeva, Uttara Baokar, Jyoti Subhash, Sarang Sathye, Ashwini Giri, Dr. Sharad Bhutadia, Dr. Shekhar Kulkarni, Neha Mahajan	Drama	
O C T	12	Gangoobai	Priya Krishnaswamy	Sarita Joshi, Purab Kohli, Mita Vashisht	Drama	
O C T	18	Vanshvel	Rajeev Patil	Ankush Chaudhary, Kishore kadam, Namrata Gaikwad, Sushant Shelar, Shantanu Gangane, Manisha Kelkar, Vidya Karanjikar, Usha Naik	Drama	
O C T	18	Maunraag	Vaibhav Abnave	Ashwini Giri, Devashish Paranjape, Gajanan Paranjape	Drama	
O C T	18	Are Avaaj Konacha	Hemant Deodhar	Dr, Amol Kolhe, Udas Tikekar, Tushar Dalvi	Political	
O C T	25	Premacha Jhol Jhal	Manoj Kotian	Siddharth Jadhav, Navin Prabhakar, Smita Gondkar, Tejaswi Patil, Vijay Patkar, Priya Berde	Romance	
N O V	8	Mandali Tumchyasathi Kay Pan	Anil Surve	Bharat Jadhav, Aditi Sarangdhar, Prasad Oak, Shekhar Phadke, Ravindra Berde, Ashok Shinde	Comedy	
N O V	8	Laal Chuda	Narendra Shinde	Mohan Joshi, Dr. Vilas Ujawane, Aditi Saranghar	Romance	
N O V	15	Tendulkar Out	Swapnil Jaykar	Sai Tamhankar, Sayaji Shinde, Santosh Juvekar	Drama	
N O V	22	Mangalashtak Once More	Sameer Joshi	Mukta Barve, Swapnil Joshi, Sai Tamhankar, Kadambari Kadam, Hemant Dhome, Vijay Patvardhan	Romance	
D E C	6	Pitruroon	Nitish Bharadwaj	Tanuja, Sachin Khedekar, Suhas Joshi, Sudha Murthy	Suspense, Drama	
D E C	20	Vijay Aso	Rahul Jadhav	Namrata Gaikwad, Chinmay Mandlekar, Murli Sharma	Action, Drama	
D E C	27	Rangkarmi	Sanjiv Kolte	Amol Kolhe, Mohan Joshi	Drama	
