= List of Marathi films of 2012 =

A list of films produced by the Marathi language film industry based in Maharashtra in the year 2012.

== January – March ==
Opening		Title	Director	Cast	Source
J A N	6	Spandan	Vegitha Reddy, Aman Tripathi	Aniket Vishwasrao, Arun Nalawade, Saii Ranade	
J A N	20	Ya Gol Gol Dabyatla	Raju Parsekar	Smita Talwalkar, Santosh Juvekar, Madhav Abhyankar, Ashok Saraf, Vijay Chavan	
J A N	20	Shala	Sujay Dahake	Anshuman Joshi, Ketaki Mategaonkar, Dilip Prabhavalkar, Ashwini Giri, Jitendra Joshi, Santosh Juvekar, Amruta Khanvilkar and Nandu Jadhav	
J A N	20	Uday	Jitendra Shikerkar	Avinash Narkar, Sampada Kulkarni, Sharad Ponkshe	
J A N	26	31 December			
J A N	26	Jana Gana Mana	Amit Abhyankar	Nandu Madhav, Santosh Juvekar, Madhura Velankar-Satam	
F E B	3	Satrangi Re	Aditya Sarpotdar	Adinath Kothare, Amruta Khanvilkar, Siddharth Chandekar, Pooja Sawant, Bhushan Pradhan, Soumil Shringarpure, Uday Tikekar, Vidyadhar Joshi, Supriya Matkari, Madhav Abhyankar	
F E B	3	Yedyanchi Jatra	Milind Arun Kawade	Bharat Jadhav, Sneha Kulkarni, Mohan Joshi, Vinay Apte	
F E B	10	Gola Berij	Kshitij Zarapkar	Nikhil Ratnaparkhi, Neha Deshpande, Dilip Prabhawalkar	
F E B	17	Bluffmaster	Kishor Saav	Ankush Choudhary, Tejaswini Pandit, Pushkar Shrotri	
F E B	24	Aai Mala Maru Nako (3D)	Satyaprakash Mangtani	Avinash Jadhav, Mrunalni, Manojanand, Komal Dhillon, Jayshree T., Viju khote, Baby Muskan, Shailesh Pitambre, Suhas D. Joshi, Mukesh Khanna	
F E B	24	Sambha - Aajcha Chava	Sanjay Todkar	Devendra Chougule, Milind Gunaji, Mohan Joshi, Madhu Kambikar, Kuldeep Pawar	
M A R	2	Kuni Mulgi Deta Ka Mulgi	Ashok Karlekar	Ashutosh Kulkarni, Sheetal Maulik, Jaywant Patekar, Megha Ghadge	
M A R	2	Matter	Satish Motling	Santosh Juvekar, Jitendra Joshi	
M A R	9	Chinu			
M A R	16	Kay Karu N Kasa Karu	Vinay A. Lad	Bharat Jadhav, Deepali Sayyad, Aditi Sarangdhar	
M A R	23	Bhanamati			
M A R	23	Thodi Khatti Thodi Hatti	Sachin Wagh	Umesh Kamat, Urmila Kanitkar-Kothare, Vidyadhar Joshi	
M A R	23	Teen Bayka Fajiti Aika	Raju Parsekar	Makarand Anaspure, Kranti Redkar, Nisha Parulkar, Tejashree Khele, Surekha Kudachi, Vijay Chavan, Kuldeep Pawar, Swapnil Rajshekhar, Varad Chavhan, Digambar Naik	
M A R	30	Chirgut	Pradeep Ghonshikar	Upendra Limaye, Chinmay Mandlekar, Siya Patil	

== April – June ==
Month	Opening	Title	Director	Cast	Source
A P R	6	Karuna Shiv Shankara	C.Vishal	Vijay Chavan, Nisha Parulekar, Deepjyoti Naik, Varad Chavhan, Yuugg, Pranali Londhe, Umesh Bolke, Prashant Neman	
A P R	13	Baboo Band Baaja	Rajesh Pinjani	Mitalee Jagtap Varadkar, Vivek Chabukswar, Milind Shinde	
A P R	13	Kashala Udyachi Baat	Pramod Joshi	Sachin Khedekar, Anupam Kher, Mrinal Kulkarni	
A P R	13	Raja Shivchattrapati	Hemant Devdhar	Dr. Amol Kolhe, Mrinal Kulkarni, Avinash Narkar	
A P R	13	Uchala Re Uchala	Yashwant Chaughule, Amol Bhave	Vaibhav Mangale, Trupti Bhoir, Anand Ingle	
A P R	20	Aarohi Gosht Tighanchi	Pramod Joshi	Ketaki Mategaonkar, Kiran Karmarkar, Mrinal Kulkarni	
A P R	20	Masala	Sandesh Kulkarni	Girish Kulkarni, Amruta Subhash, Shriram Lagoo	
A P R	27	Khel Mandala	Viju Mane	Mangesh Desai, Ananya Devre, Uday Sabnis, Kushal Badrike	
A P R	27	Zalay Dimag Kharab	Abhijeet Guru	Nikhil Raut, Sanjay Mohite, Akshaya Bhingarde	
M A Y	4	Ha Bharat Mazha	Sumitra Bhave, Sunil Sukhtankar	Vikram Gokhale, Uttara Baokar, Renuka Daftardar	
M A Y	4	Kaksparsh	Mahesh Manjrekar	Sachin Khedekar, Priya Bapat, Medha Manjrekar, Savita Malpekar, Ketaki Mategaonkar	
M A Y	11	Ajintha	Nitin Chandrakant Desai	Sonalee Kulkarni, Philip Scott Wallace, Manoj Kolhatkar	
M A Y	18	Atmabodh			
M A Y	18	Chintoo	Shrirang Godbole	Subhankar Atre, Suhani Deshpande, Animesh Padhye, Subodh Bhave, Vibhawari Deshpande, Shriram Pendse, Dilip Prabhavalkar, Bharti Aacharekar	
M A Y	18	Swapna Tujhe Ni Majhe	Ashok Kambli	Neha Joshi, Omkar Karve, Milind Gunaji	
M A Y	25	Jay Jay Maharashtra Majha	Gautam Joglekar	Hemant Dhome, Anusha Dandekar, Mahesh Manjrekar	
M A Y	25	Mala Ek Chanas Hava	Baal Mohite	Makarand Anaspure, Deepali Sayyad, Kuldeep Pawar, Chetan Dalvi	
M A Y	25	Saheb	K. Vilas	Dr. Amol Kolhe, Mohan Joshi, Aniket Kelkar	
J U N	1	Aamhi Ka Tisre	Ramesh More	Milind Gawali, Sandesh Jadhav, Mangesh Mokashi	
J U N	1	Dhagedore	Akshay Yashwant Datt	Umesh Kamat, Sai Tamhankar, Bhargavi Chirmule	
J U N	1	Lau Ka Laath	Vijay Patkar	Vijay Patkar, Hemlata Bane, Vijay Kadam	
J U N	8	Baburao La Pakdaa	Ashish Ubale	Sanjay Narvekar, Bharat Jadhav, Makarand Anaspure, Sameer Dharmadhikari, Nisha Parulekar, Sai Tamhankar	
J U N	8	Tukaram	Chandrakant Kulkarni	Jitendra Joshi, Padmanabh Gaikwad, Prateeksha Lonkar, Radhika Apte, Veena Jamkar, Sharad Ponkshe, Yatin Karyekar	

== July – September ==
Month	Opening	Title	Director	Cast	Source
J U L	13	Aik (Listen)	Pratik Kadam	Swapnil Jadhav, Aditi Sarangdhar, Prasad Oak, Suhas Palshikar, Chinmay Mandlekar, Shekhar Phadke, Tanishq Sonawane, Prashant Neman, Poonam Jadhav	
J U L	20	Badam Rani Gulam Chor	Satish Rajwade	Upendra Limaye, Mukta Barve, Pushkar Shrotri	
J U L	27	Har Har Mahadev	Subhash Phadke	Sanjay Narvekar, Arun Nalawade, Amita Khopkar	
J U L	27	Satya, Savitree ani Satyawan	Sarvesh Parab	Amruta Patki, Sachit Patil, Shruti Marathe	
A U G	10	Bharatiya	Girish Mohite	Subhodh Bhave, Jeetendra Joshi, Meeta Sawarkar	
A U G	10	Dusarya Jagatali	Satish Randive	Rajdutt, Vaishanavi Ranadive, Madhu Kambikar	
A U G	17	Yedpat Gaon	S. Vikram	Bajrang Badshah, Megha Ghadage, Milind Gunaji, Chetan Dalvi	
A U G	24	Aaghor	Salim Sheikh	Santosh Juvekar, Aniket Vishwasrao, Sai Tamhankar	
A U G	24	Hridayanath	Amar Gupte	Jackie Shroff, Aditya Pancholi, Swarangi Marathe	
A U G	31	Champions	Ramesh More	Shantanu Ranganekar, Machindra Gadkar, Avinash Narkar, Aishwarya Narkar, Arun Nalawde, Uday Sabnis, Hridaynath Rane, Mrunal Chemburkar, Savita Goswami, Bhagyashree Pane, Rajesh Ambole, Ashok Parab	
A U G	31	Kutumb	Sudesh Manjrekar	Jitendra Joshi, Veena Jamkar, Gauri Ingawlae	
A U G	31	Yere Yere Paisa	Shailesh Shankar Kale	Makarand Anaspure, Satish Taare, Dr. Vilas Ujawne	
S E P	7	No Entry Pudhe Dhoka Aahey	Ankush Choudhary	Ankush Choudhary, Bharat Jadhav, Aniket Vishwasrao, Sai Tamhankar, Kranti Redkar, Manwa Naik, Sai Lokur, Pady Kamble	
S E P	21	4 Idiots	Milind Arun Kawade	Bharat Jadhav, Siddarth Jadhav, Guru Anand	
S E P	28	Dum Asel Tar	Vijay Gokhale	Shankar Shingare, Smita Shewale, Manava Naik	

== October – December ==
Month	Opening	Title	Director	Cast	Source
O C T	5	Saad	Hemant Dhabde	Analesh Desai, Avantika Salian, Arun Nalawade	
O C T	12	Pipanee	Gajendra Ahire	Makarand Anaspure, Chandrakant Kulkarni, Ravi Kale	
O C T	19	Langar	Sandeep Navare	Manava Naik, Ravi Kale, Kishori Shahane	
O C T	19	Preet Tujhi Majhi	Anand Shishupal	Ashok Saraf, Nisha Parulkar, Prasad Oak	
O C T	19	Soon Sambhala Patleenbai	Devendra Lute	Seema Godbole, Sadanand Borkar, Devendra Lute	
O C T	24	Shree Partner	Sameer Ramesh Surve	Padmanabh Bind, Shweta Pagar, Lalan Sarang	
O C T	26	Fakta Saatvi Pass	Prakash Panchal	Sanjay Narvekar, Sharad Ponkshe, Kuldeep Pawar	
N O V	2	Hi Vaat Jeevanachi	Harbans Sidhu	Alka Kubal, Dr. Vilas Ujawne, Pooja Nayak	
N O V	2	Night School	Mansingh Pawar	Sandeep Kulkarni, Prasad Pandit, Shrikant Yadav	
N O V	2	The Strugglers - Amhi Udyache Hero	Vijay Shinde	Chinmay Mandlekar, Deepali Mandavkar, Sanjay Mone	
N O V	30	Aayna Ka Bayna	Samit Kakkad	Amruta Khanvilkar, Sachin Khedekar, Raqesh Bapat, Ganesh Yadav, Siddhesh Pai	
N O V	30	Eka Varchad Ek	Rajesh Patole	Milind Gawali, Chetan Dalvi, Gauri Kadam, Vijay Chavan, Sandesh Kulkarni, Milind Gawali, Kushal Badrike, Varsha Bhonsle, Tanvi Kale, Ujwala Gaikwad	
D E C	7	Mokala Shwas	Kanchan Adhikari	Mohan Joshi, Sharad Ponkshe, Mrunmayee Deshpande	
D E C	12	Shyamche Vadil	R.Viraj	Tushar Dalvi, Reema Lagoo, Sulekha Talwalkar, Chinmay Udgirkar	
D E C	14	Sukanya	Mangesh Nehre	Ravindra Mahajani, Vimal Mhatre, Siya Patil, Shrikant Kamat	
D E C	14	Shivaji the Real Hero	Shakti Shankar Jaju	Bharat Jadhav, Sidharth Jaju, Kamlakar Satpute	
D E C	28	Vijay Aso	Rahul Jadhav	Chinmay Mandlekar, Ganesh Yadav, Murli Sharma, Namrata Gaikwad, Amita Khopkar, Janardan Parab, Priyadarshan Jadhav, Rohan Gujar, Mangesh Kawade, Vishnu Kokane	
D E C	28	Aamhi Chamakate Taare	Prakash Jadhav	Bharat Jadhav, Prasad Oak, Nisha Parulekar, Indrajeet More, Reema Lagoo, Satish Pulekar, Sneha Raikar, Sanyogita Bhave, Anand Abhyankar	
