= Rasika Productions =

- Company type: Private
- Industry: Entertainment
- Founded: Mumbai, Maharashtra
- Founder: Mukta Barve
- Headquarters: Mumbai, Maharashtra, India
- Key people: Mukta Barve (chairwoman)
- Products: Plays

Rasika Productions is an Indian Marathi play production and distribution company based in Mumbai as part of the Marathi theatre industry. The company was founded by Mukta Barve in 2013.

== History ==
Mukta Barve who impressed her fans through her performances in plays, television and films, debuted as a producer in Marathi theatre with her production house named after late actress Rasika Joshi. Barve's first production as a producer was the play titled Chhapa Kata, which saw her play the lead role along with veteran actress Reema Lagoo. According to Barve, this production house is her tribute to her friendship with Rasika. Later she produced two plays Lovebirds (2015), Indira (2015) and Rang Nava (2014), a poetry based theatre program.

== Productions ==
Title	Year	Director	Cast	Ref(s).
Chhapa Kata	2013	Sameer Vidwans	Mukta Barve, Reema Lagoo, Neena Kulkarni, Ashish Kulkarni	
Rang Nava	2014	Mukta Barve	Mukta Barve	
Lovebirds	2015	Girish Joshi	Mukta Barve, Vidyadhar Joshi	
Indira	2015	Ratnakar Matkari	Supriya Vinod, Vikram Gaikwad, Purva Subhash, Nakul Ghanekar	
Code Mantra	2016	Rajesh Joshi	Mukta Barve, Ajay Purkar	
Deepsthamb	2016	Jayant Jathar	Nandita Dhuri and Harish Dudhade	
