= Sumbaran =

- Theatrical release poster
- Directed by: Gajendra Ahire
- Produced by: Anil Phatdare
- Starring: Makarand Anaspure; Vrinda Ahire; Jeetendra Joshi; Mukta Barve; Siddharth Jadhav; Sai Tamhankar; Ravindra Mankani; Ravi Kale; Aditi Bhagwat
- Cinematography: Surya Mishra
- Music by: Vishwanath More
- Production company: Everest Entertainment
- Release date: 19 November 2009
- Country: India
- Language: Marathi

Sumbaran is a 2009 Indian Marathi-language film released on 19 November 2009. The film was produced by Anil Phatdare and directed by Gajendra Ahire.

== Cast ==
- Makarand Anaspure as Vasant Deshmukh Patil
- Jeetendra Joshi as Veeru Deshmukh Patil
- Mukta Barve as Kalyani
- Siddhart Jadhav as Uttam
- Sai Tamhankar as Mukta
- Ravindra Mankani as Deshmukh Patil
- Vrinda Ahire as Vasanta's Wife
- Ravi Kale as Biroba
- Ashwini Kalsekar as Kamli Aai
- Swarali Patil as Shaku

The cast includes Seema Deshmukh, Makarand Anaspure, Vrinda Ahire, Jeetendra Joshi, Mukta Barve, Siddharth Jadhav, Sai Tamhankar, Ashwini Kalsekar, Ravindra Mankani Ravi Kale and Jayant Savarkar.

== Soundtrack ==
The music is provided by Rahul Ranade.

- Dongarachya Potamadhe - Shaan, Janvi Arora
- Punvechya Chandnyat - Nandesh Umap
- Rutu Yetil Jatil - Shaan, Janvi Arora
- Punvechya Chandnyat Jazz - Ajit Parab
- Deva Tuzhe Sumbaran - Nandesh Umap
