= Thanks Maa =

2010 film by Irfan Kamal

- Film poster
- Directed by: Irfan Kamal
- Written by: Irfan Kamal; Vishal Vijay Kumar
- Starring: Master Shams Patel; Master Salman; Master Fayaaz; Baby Almas; Ravi Mahashabde; Master Jaffer; Baby Sakshi; Barry John
- Cinematography: Ajayan Vincent
- Edited by: Amit Saxena
- Music by: Ranjit Barot
- Production company: Quantum Films Limited
- Distributed by: SPE Films India
- Release date: 5 March 2010
- Country: India
- Language: Hindi

Thanks Maa (transl. Thanks mother) is a 2009 Indian Hindi language drama film, directed by Irfan Kamal, distributed by Sony Pictures Entertainment India. The film focuses on child abandonment in India. It has been officially selected to be screened at the Edinburgh International Film Festival, the Pusan International Film Festival, the Montreal World Film Festival, the Cannes Film Festival, the International Film Festival of India and the Palm Springs International Film Festival. The debut child actor Master Shams Patel has also won Best Child Artist for the film, at the 56th National Film Awards.

== Plot ==
A 12-year-old street kid named Municipality, while on the run from the reformatory, finds and saves a two-day-old abandoned child from being prey to a ferocious street dog. Failing to find any takers among the people he deemed responsible and respectable, Municipality takes up the onus of finding the child's mother himself. Here onwards ensues his struggle in the urban jungle of Mumbai with just four of his friends from the streets: Soda (15), Sursuri (10), Cutting (8), and Dhed-shaana (6).

Municipality's rock-steady determination ultimately helps him emerge a winner against all odds as he reaches the child's mother. In the bargain, he loses his 'God like' and flawless image of a mother he used to anticipate in his dreams. A mother, who he hoped, would come searching for him someday at the Municipality Hospital, where he was abandoned 12 years ago.

The film ends by showcasing some of the real-life issues of abandoned children and the misery they face in their day-to-day lives.

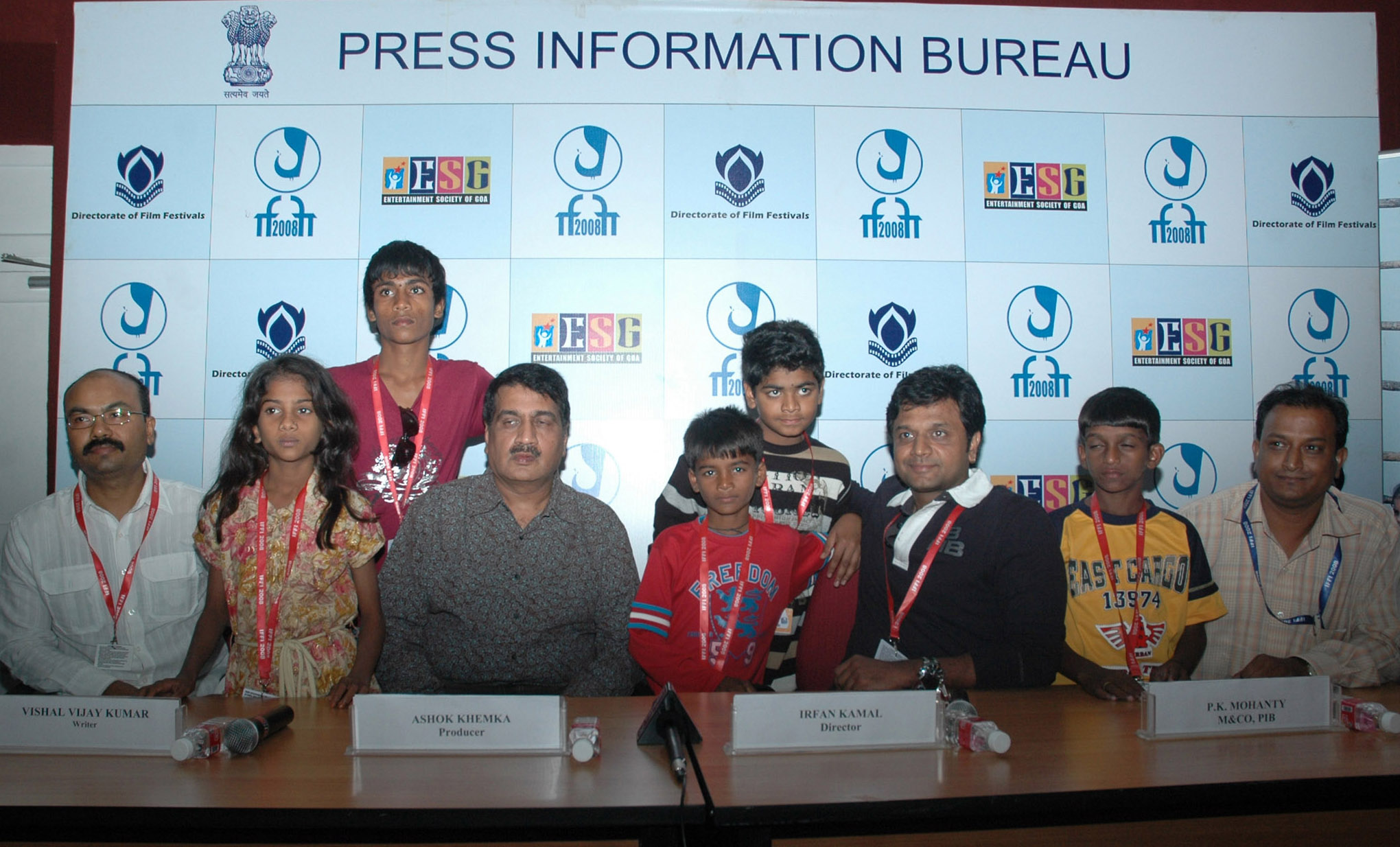
Film crew at IFFI (2008)

== Cast ==
- Master Shams as Municipality Ghatkopar (W)
- Master Salman as Soda
- Master Fayyaz as Cutting
- Baby Almas as Sursuri
- Master Jaffer as Dhed-Shaana
- Baby Sakshi as Krish
- Alok Nath as Warden of the Reformatory
- Raghubir Yadav as Peon of the Municipality Hospital
- Barry John as Priest at the Church
- Sanjay Mishra as The Cab Driver
- Ranvir Shorey as Mr.Motwani
- Mukta Barve as Lakshmi The Prostitute
- Jalees Sherwani as Head Eunuch
- Bikramjeet Kanwarpal
- Subrat Dutta
- Balkrishna Shinde as Tatya langada
- Ayesha Raza as Motwani's wife
- Rasika Dugal as Krish's biological mother
- Yatin Karyekar as Krish's biological father
- Rukhsar Rehman as Municipality's biological mother
