= Ganvesh =

2016 Marathi-language film

- Promotional poster
- Directed by: Atul Jagdale
- Written by: Tejas Ghadge
- Produced by: Atul Jagdale; Sachin Deshmukh
- Starring: Kishor Kadam; Mukta Barve; Dilip Prabhavalkar; Smita Tambe
- Cinematography: Atul Jagdale
- Edited by: Rajesh Rao
- Music by: Music: Nihar Shembekar; Score: Mangesh Dhakde
- Production company: Vijayate Entertainment
- Distributed by: Eros International
- Release date: 24 June 2016
- Running time: 130 minutes
- Country: India
- Language: Marathi

Ganvesh (transl. The Uniform) is an Indian Marathi-language drama film directed by Atul Jagdale. The film stars Kishor Kadam, Mukta Barve, Dilip Prabhavalkar and Smita Tambe. Music by Nihar Shembekar. The film was released on 24 June 2016.

== Synopsis ==
A poor couple who work in a brick manufacturing company struggles to provide their child with a new uniform as it becomes necessary before he gives a speech in front of a minister.

== Cast ==
- Kishor Kadam as Madhu's father
- Mukta Barve as Meera Patil
- Dilip Prabhavalkar as education minister
- Smita Tambe
- Guru Thakur
- Nagesh Bhosale
- Suhas Palshikar
- Ganesh Yadav
- Sharad Ponkshe
- Tanmay Mande as Madhu

== Soundtrack ==
Ganvesh

Soundtrack album by Nihar Shembekar
- Released: 2016
- Genre: Feature film soundtrack
- Length: 9:56
- Language: Marathi
- Label: Zee Music Company

Official audio
- Ganvesh – Full Album on YouTube

All music is composed by Nihar Shembekar.

Track listing
No.	Title	Singer(s)	Length
1.	"Mol"	Nandesh Umap	4:33
2.	"Kaarbhaari"	Urmila Dhangar, Nandesh Umap	5:23
Total length:			9:56

== Reception ==
=== Critical reception ===
Ganvesh film received positive reviews from critics. Mihir Bhanage of The Times of India gave the film 3.5 stars out of 5 and wrote "Ganvesh is a heart-warming film that strikes the right chords. It teaches you a few life lessons and is definitely worth a watch". Ganesh Matkari of Pune Mirror wrote "Realist films exploring the social situation have a tendency to end on a negative note underlining the futility of the situation. Ganvesh ends on a marginally positive note but doesn’t feel like a compromise". A Reviewer of The Hollywood Reporter Wrote "The real hero of the tale emerges only gradually and it is Suryesh, the poor but proud father who searches high and low for the small amount needed to buy his beloved son a school uniform". Jaydeep Pathak of Maharashtra Times gave the film 3.5 stars out of 5 and wrote "This is the story of many uniforms created by the system. An attempt is made here to impress upon the audience the content of the fight given in their own way against the system. However, there are some 'threads' of this uniform too. This 'uniform' should be seen as a positive effort". A Reviewer of Loksatta wrote "In terms of acting, this movie is right. Some of the scenes in the film are very well put together. The comparison of Madhu's Independence Day speech between the Patri government's fight to oust the British and his father's struggle for uniform is truly heart-wrenching".
