= Devi (2020 film) =

2020 Indian short film by Priyanka Banerjee

- Digital release poster
- Directed by: Priyanka Banerjee
- Written by: Priyanka Banerjee
- Produced by: Niranjan Iyengar; Ryan Ivan Stephen
- Starring: Kajol; Shruti Haasan; Neha Dhupia; Neena Kulkarni; Mukta Barve; Shivani Raghuvanshi; Sandhya Mhatre; Rama Joshi; Yashaswini Dayama
- Cinematography: Savita Singh
- Edited by: Sanjeev Sachdeva
- Music by: Yash Sahai
- Production company: Electric Apples Entertainment
- Distributed by: Royal Stag Barrel Select Large Short Films
- Release date: 2 March 2020
- Running time: 13 minutes
- Country: India
- Language: Hindi

Devi (transl. Goddess) is an Indian Hindi-language suspense drama short film directed by first-time director Priyanka Banerjee and produced by Niranjan Iyengar and Ryan Ivan Stephen, whose production company operates as Electric Apples Entertainment. Featuring Kajol and Shruti Haasan in their first digital project, Devi depicts nine women from distinct strata of society forced into a sisterhood due to circumstances in which they are compelled to share their stories of abuse. The film also stars Neha Dhupia, Neena Kulkarni, Mukta Barve, Shivani Raghuvanshi, Yashaswini Dayama, Sandhya Mhatre and Rama Joshi.

== Plot ==
A group of women, who are all dead, from different walks of life are living together in a small room. They are all busy with their own errands: a Hindu woman, Jyoti, performing prayers; a medical student in a lab coat studying; three older Marathi women playing cards, Sandhya Mhatre, Rama Joshi; a career oriented woman in a suit rocking on a chair; a modern woman, Maya, drinking alcohol; a burqa-clad Muslim woman, Arzu, waxing her legs and a mute girl trying to fix the TV set. She manages to get the TV working, a breaking news of a horrific case which has "shaken up the conscience of the country" is being broadcast but before the details of the case are revealed, the TV loses signal again. All the women look at each other scared as if they know what had happened.

A few moments later, the doorbell rings which results in arguments among the women about the room being too small to take anymore people and some of women think that the girl outside should be allowed in as she has nowhere else to go. The medical student suggests that not everyone can stay in the room, someone will have to go outside to make room for the new arrival. While trying to decide who leaves to make space, they all reveal their history of abuse, and who and how old their rapist was. Arzu reveals she was burnt to death. Jyoti reveals that she had been strangled and Maya says that her rapist had rammed a beer bottle into her and then threw her on the highway. They all had one thing in common: they were all raped and murdered excluding the career oriented woman who reveals she committed suicide after the tragedy. With no decision made and the arguments getting out of hand, Jyoti manages to calm them down and announces that no one will leave, and that it will be better to stay in a crowded room than go back to a life of abuse.

Before opening the door, reminds them all how scared they were when they first came in the room. She opens the door and brings a child in - this leaves all the women shocked, embarrassed and teary-eyed. The child runs to Savitri and hugs her while a reporter on the TV talks about there being no safety of women in India. The film ends with a caption listing rape statistics in India and how women are being raped in a country which worships goddesses, alluding to the film's name - Devi.

== Cast ==
- Kajol as Jyoti
- Shruti Haasan as Maya
- Neha Dhupia
- Neena Kulkarni as Savitri
- Mukta Barve as Arzu
- Shivani Raghuvanshi Yashu
- Yashaswini Dayama as Zooni
- Sandhya Mhatre as Lakshmi
- Rama Joshi as Baby

== Release ==
The film was released by Royal Stag Barrel Select Large Short Films on 2 March 2020. A special screening event was held on the day of the release.

== Reception ==
=== Accolades ===
Devi garnered 2 Million+ views in 24 hours and 10 Million+ in a week which was the highest for a short film in recent times. It went on to win the Best Short Film award at the Filmfare Awards 2021.

=== Critic reviews ===
At release, the film received mostly positive reviews from critics. Tanmayi Savadi from Peeping Moon wrote, "While a number of projects have addressed rape and sexual harassment against women, but Devi stands apart. A perfect balance of empowerment and emotions, the film is relevant, layered and surely a masterpiece that deserves attention." She also praised the performances of all the actresses as well as Priyanka Banerjee for creating a film on a topic so important in such a "subtle and effective manner". She especially praised the performances of Kajol and Neena Kulkarni. She believes Kajol as always has done "a phenomenal job" and emotions, such as strength, fear and disgust are shown by her very well. As for Neena Kulkarni she wrote, "Neena's expressions towards the end are hard to miss and her experience added to the magic."

== Controversy ==
Filmmaker Abhishek Rai accused the short film's makers of copying the concept of his short film FOUR, which is also available on YouTube. Rai's film was also about three rape victims talking in a room after their death. “Here’s something I’d like to bring to everybody’s notice. We at AndaKurry Productions, made a short film when we were in film school, two years back called ‘FOUR’ that dealt with a premise of rape victims sitting together in a room when a new victim arrives,” he had written in his post. “And yesterday, a film named ‘Devi’ was uploaded to LargeShortFilms's YouTube channel that has heavy resemblance and the premise is also of the film we made,” Rai said in a Facebook post. He said it is “ruthless” on the part of Devi makers to claim his work as theirs."

In an exclusive interview with IndiaToday.in, Abhishek Rai talked about his first reaction after watching Devi, his failed attempts to contact the makers and more. According to Rai, "I tried to contact Priyanka Banerjee (director of Devi) through Instagram, seeking some explanation. I got no response from her or any of the makers. Then I reached out to people on Twitter and Facebook and shared the link of my film so that they can themselves spot the similarities." Rai added: "They should have, at least, notified me about the film. I deserve some credit or an acknowledgement for Devi. To be honest, now I need a public apology. We are waiting for their response, we really want to listen to their side. We will move ahead legally with the support of our college if they don't give us an explanation.".

When asked about plagiarism by Anupama Chopra during an interview on the Film Companion YouTube channel, "Devi actor Kajol and producer Niranjan Iyengar dodged questions on the plagiarism charges against their film. Producer Niranjan Iyengar told Film Companion’s Anupama Chopra that it’s for the audience to decide what they feel about the two films....When Anupama pressed further, Niranjan declined to talk about it anymore."

"Fans were left disappointed by Niranjan and Kajol’s response to the controversy. “You people have copied the entire concept. Better accept it. Rather than trying to escape the allegations. You should learn to acknowledge the original thought and creativity then only people will respect your work,” read a comment on Film Companion's video. “I just saw ethics being butchered. What a shameless man.” ‘He would not like to comment anymore’ read another comment."
