= Smile Please (2019 film) =

2019 Indian Marathi language drama film

- Directed by: Vikram Phadnis
- Written by: Vikram Phadnis
- Screenplay by: Vikram Phadnis & Iravati Karnik
- Produced by: Nisha Sujan; Saanika Gandhi; Hashtag Film Studios; Krtyavat Production
- Starring: Mukta Barve; Lalit Prabhakar; Prasad Oak
- Cinematography: Milind Jog
- Edited by: Imran- Faisal
- Music by: Rohan-Rohan
- Production companies: Everest Entertainment; Sunshine Studios
- Distributed by: Sunshine Studios
- Release date: 19 July 2019
- Running time: 134 minutes
- Country: India
- Language: Marathi

Smile Please is an Indian Marathi language drama film directed by Vikram Phadnis. The film follows Nandini Joshi (played by Mukta Barve) a photographer who is diagnosed with early-onset dementia and struggles to find a sense of purpose and dignity.

The film was released on 19 July 2019. Hrithik Roshan gave muhurat's first clap for the film, whereas Riteish Deshmukh launched the first poster and Karan Johar unveiled the first teaser. Later on, Shahrukh Khan launched another trailer.

== Plot ==
Nandini is a young woman who is an acclaimed and well-known photographer. But after she is diagnosed with early-onset dementia, she meets Viraj, who becomes her friend and gives her hope. The film focuses on Nandini and Viraj as she struggles with dementia and tries to find a purpose in life.

== Cast ==
- Mukta Barve as Nandini
- Lalit Prabhakar as Viraj
- Prasad Oak as Shishir Sarang, Nandini's ex husband and Nupur's father
- Satish Alekar as Appa, Nandini's father
- Aditi Govitrikar as Anju, Nandini's psychologist
- Trupti Khamkar as Jyoti
- Vedashree Mahajan as Nupur‘Napa’, Nandini and Shishir's daughter
- Bijay Anand as Jatin, Nandini's boss
- Mayuresh Wadkar

== Release ==
The official teaser of the film was unveiled on 11 June 2019 by Karan Johar and the trailer was released on 26 June 2019 by Shah Rukh Khan. The film was released on 19 July 2019.

== Critical response ==
Devesh Sharma, reviewing for Filmfare, rated the film 3.5/5 stars, praising the performance of Barve and the supporting cast. He wrote, "Mukta Barve makes you experience all the stages through her heartfelt performance." He recommended watching the film for its positive message, and concluded, “Watch this well-meaning film for its positive message about a disease which has been affecting around four million people in our country alone." Mihir Bhanage of The Times of India rated the film 3/5 stars, praising the performances of Mukta Barve, Prasad, Satish Alekar. However, he felt that a 'crisper editing' would have been better for film. In the conclusion, he wrote "Smile Please has its highs and lows, the latter overshadowing the former at times, but as a complete film, this one is definitely better than Phadnis’ first. And true to its title, the climax brings a smile to your face."

Barve received the Filmfare Marathi Awards 2020 in Best Actress category for the film, and she dedicated the award to Phadnis' mother; whose life served as an inspiration for the film. She had received an award in the same category for the film Hrudayantar (2017), which was also directed by Phadnis.

== Accolades ==
Year	Award	Category	Nominee	Result	Ref.
57th Maharashtra State Film Award	Maharashtra State Film Award	Best Costume Design	Vikram Phadnis	Won	
57th Maharashtra State Film Award	Maharashtra State Film Award	Best Screenplay	Vikram Phadnis and Iravati Karnik	Won	
57th Maharashtra State Film Award	Maharashtra State Film Award	Best Music Director	Rohan-Rohan	Nominated	
57th Maharashtra State Film Award	Maharashtra State Film Award	Best Background Score	Prafful - Swapnil	Won	
57th Maharashtra State Film Award	Maharashtra State Film Award	Best Film Third	Vikram Phadnis	Won	
2021	Filmfare Marathi Awards	Best Film	Vikram Phadnis	Nominated	
2021	Filmfare Marathi Awards	Best Director	Vikram Phadnis	Nominated	
2021	Filmfare Marathi Awards	Best Story	Vikram Phadnis	Nominated	
2021	Filmfare Marathi Awards	Best Costume Design	Vikram Phadnis	Nominated	
2021	Filmfare Marathi Awards	Best Actress	Mukta Barve	Won	
2021	Filmfare Marathi Awards	Best Music Director	Rohan-Rohan	Nominated	
2021	Filmfare Marathi Awards	Best Screenplay	Vikram Phadnis And Iravati Karnik	Nominated	
2021	Filmfare Marathi Awards	Best Cinematographer	Milind Jog	Nominated	
2021	Filmfare Marathi Awards	Best Sound	Rohan Pradhan	Nominated	

== Soundtrack ==
Smile Please

Soundtrack album by Rohan-Rohan
- Released: 17 July 2019
- Recorded: 2019
- Genre: Feature film soundtrack
- Length: 12:35
- Language: Marathi
- Label: Everest Entertainment LLP
External audio
- Audio Jukebox on YouTube

The soundtrack is composed by music composer duo Rohan-Rohan, with lyrics by Manndar Cholkar. The song "Shwaas De" is sung by Singer Rohan Pradhan. "Chal Pudhe Chal Tu" (Anthem Song) is sung by Avadhoot Gupte, Mugdha Karhade, Bela Shende, Rohan Pradhan, Sachin Pilgaonkar and Gwen Dias. The song "Anolkhi" is sung by Sunidhi Chauhan.

Track listing
No.	Title	Lyrics	Music	Singer(s)	Length
1.	"Shwaas De"	Manndar Cholkar	Rohan-Rohan	Rohan Pradhan	3:47
2.	"Chal Pudhe Chal Tu ( Anthem Song)"	Manndar Cholkar	Rohan-Rohan	Avadhoot Gupte, Mugdha Karhade, Bela Shende, Rohan Pradhan, Sachin Pilgaonkar, Gwen Dias	3:33
3.	"Anolkhi"	Manndar Cholkar	Rohan-Rohan	Sunidhi Chauhan	5:15
Total length:					12:35
