= Rudram (TV series) =

- Genre: Thriller; Drama
- Created by: Potadi Entertainment
- Written by: Girish Joshi
- Directed by: Bhimrao Mude
- Starring: See below
- Theme music composer: Narendra Bhide
- Country of origin: India
- No. of episodes: 74

Production
- Executive producers: Nikhil Seth; Vinod Lavekar; Sandesh Kulkarni
- Editors: Prathmesh Patkar, Ashwini bagde
- Running time: 22 minutes

Original release
- Network: Zee Yuva
- Release: 7 August – 16 November 2017

Rudram is a Marathi thriller television series was directed by Bhimrao Mude, written by Girish Joshi and produced by Nikhil Sheth, Vinod Lavekar, Sandesh Kulkarni under the production house Potadi Entertainment. The series starred Mukta Barve, Vandana Gupte, Satish Rajwade, Mohan Agashe among others and debuted on Zee Yuva on 7 August 2017. The final episode was broadcast on 16 November 2017.

== Plot ==
Ragini (Mukta Barve) is an ordinary young woman living an ordinary life. Her life is turned up side down when her husband, only child and her father are killed in a car accident, but luckily she survives. Dealing with the following guilt and mental trauma, with the help of her physciatrist (Mohan Agashe) and accompanied by her mother (Vandana Gupte) she discovers that the accident was a premediated murder. This sets her on a journey of investigation and revenge, while struggling with personal and emotional challenges.

== Cast ==
- Mukta Barve as Ragini Desai
- Vandana Gupte as Ragini's mother
- Kiran Karmarkar as Makheeja
- Anand Alkunte as Inspector Sadanand Dhurat
- Satish Rajwade
- Mohan Agashe
- Sandeep Pathak
- Aniruddha Joshi
- Suhas Palshikar
- Vivek Lagoo
- Suhas Shirsat
- Mitali Jagtap
- Sai Ranade
- Milind Phatak
- Sunil Abhyankar
- Kiran Khoje
- Ashish Kulkarni
- Prathmesh Gurav

== Graphics series on social media ==
To help viewers keep up with the progress of the series, a weekly graphic series was published by Zee Yuva's digital team on their social media channels (Facebook and Instagram).
