= Mumbai-Pune-Mumbai =

- Theatrical release poster
- Directed by: Satish Rajwade
- Screenplay by: Parag Kulkarni; Satish Rajwade
- Story by: Parag Kulkarni; Satish Rajwade
- Produced by: Mirah Entertainments Pvt. Ltd.
- Starring: Swapnil Joshi; Mukta Barve
- Cinematography: Suhas Gujrati
- Edited by: Rajesh Rao
- Music by: Avinash-Vishwajeet
- Production company: Mirah Entertainment Pvt. Ltd
- Distributed by: Twinkle Group
- Release date: 11 June 2010
- Running time: 101 minutes
- Country: India
- Language: Marathi

Mumbai-Pune-Mumbai is a 2010 Indian Marathi-language romantic comedy film directed and co-written by Satish Rajwade. Released on 11 June 2010, the film stars Swapnil Joshi and Mukta Barve as the only two unnamed characters from different cities of Pune and Mumbai, respectively, and the film is about how their competitive spirits bring them together. The film was critically and commercially successful at the box office, and is the first installment of the Mumbai-Pune-Mumbai film series before its two sequels titled Mumbai-Pune-Mumbai 2 (2015) and Mumbai-Pune-Mumbai 3 (2018). The film was remade in Hindi by Rajwade himself as Mumbai Delhi Mumbai (2014), in Kannada as Pyarge Aagbittaite, in Telugu as Made in Vizag and in Punjabi as Chandigarh Amritsar Chandigarh. In Gujarati, it is remade as Taari Saathe.

== Plot ==
The film revolves around two young unnamed characters: a girl (Mukta Barve) from Mumbai and a boy (Swapnil Joshi) from Pune. "Ms. Mumbai" is portrayed to be travelling all alone to Pune dressed in a long red skirt and a white top to meet a prospective groom (who is referred to as Hridaymardam after the name of his residential colony, and whom she has already decided to reject). After passing from one junction to another searching for the address, Ms. Mumbai finally reaches the destination point where a group of friends is playing cricket. She chooses none other than "Mr. Pune", the batsman dressed in Bermuda shorts, an overcoat and sports shoes, to know the exact location of the house, causing him to lose his concentration and get clean bowled by the bowler. Despite this, Mr. Pune directs Ms. Mumbai to the location in the typical Puneite manner, which she has a bit trouble understanding due to the same language being spoken differently in two major cities of Maharashtra. After reaching the location, Ms. Mumbai is surprised to find the door locked, and checks the neighbouring houses to get Hridaymardam's whereabouts, only to be turned away rudely by his neighbors. Ms. Mumbai is unable to contact Hridaymardam as her mobile phone has run out of battery, so she contacts her sister in Mumbai via public telephone to inform her about his non-availability. At this point, Ms. Mumbai bumps into Mr. Pune again. The two of them instantly argue, but end up bonding over each other's attachment for their native cities. She shares her experience at Hridaymardam's residence with his neighbour, commenting that people from Mumbai should learn "how to insult" from Pune locals. As a result, Mr. Pune gets defensive about his city, stating that an "ideal homemaker" in Pune is busy in the home, so she would naturally turn a stranger at her door away. Ms. Mumbai proceeds to request Mr. Pune for directions to the nearest coffee shop. He instead takes her for a ride on his scooter, to which she agrees, only to avoid the hassle of searching for an address and missing him again.

In the coffee shop, the duo continues to debate about their respective hometowns and constantly try to boast about their own city. Ms. Mumbai also informs Mr. Pune that she has travelled so long to meet Hridaymardam only on her mother's insistence, and that she herself does not trust the "marriage institution", much to Mr. Pune's surprise. At the end of their conversation, Ms. Mumbai bluntly states that she would only pay for her own coffee. Mr. Pune reveals that he has no money and requests Ms. Mumbai to pay for his coffee too for the moment, promising that he will repay her later. She asks him whether he has any money in his bank account, and an offended Mr. Pune answers that he does, offering her to keep his expensive watch as mortgage until he gives the money to her. After withdrawing and repaying her money from a nearby ATM, Mr. Pune sarcastically states that Ms. Mumbai is excellent at bookkeeping and that she must be a chartered accountant the way she managed the situation. Ms. Mumbai responds by informing that she is a successful fashion designer, which provides Mr. Pune with an excuse to continue the conversation by requesting for her opinion on Pune's fashion. Ms. Mumbai states that Pune is immature and outdated when it comes to fashion, causing Mr. Pune to argue again and present his local rings and accessories to her. Ms. Mumbai is exasperated due to Mr. Pune's talkative nature, but the duo shares a begrudging, curious chemistry nevertheless.

Between bouts of incessant but playful culture-bashing, Ms. Mumbai states to Mr. Pune that now she will meet Hridaymardam at her own leisure since the latter has forced her to wait for him. Thus, Mr. Pune accompanies her to visit famous landmarks in Pune like the garden-temple of Sarasbaug, the crowded market of Tulshibaug, the ancient Sinhagad Fort, and finally the grand Shri Dagadusheth Halwai Ganapati Temple. Gradually but definitely, the duo begins understanding each other, sharing intimate details about their respective love lives and cultural upbringing. Through all of this, Mr. Pune never leaves Ms. Mumbai's company and vice versa, despite many scenarios where they could both have gone their separate ways. At one point, Ms. Mumbai tries to contact Hridaymardam from Mr. Pune's mobile phone, but the phone number is engaged. Thinking nothing of it, Ms. Mumbai spends the rest of the day with Mr. Pune, eventually deciding to return to Mumbai without meeting Hridaymardam. Finally, Mr. Pune drops Ms. Mumbai off back at the Pune Junction Railway Station where she hands a written letter (which explains her reasons for her disinterest in marrying Hridaymardam) over to him, requesting Mr. Pune to deliver the letter to Hridaymardam. They both bid their farewells and, for the first time, ask the names of each other. As Mr. Pune identifies himself as just "Pune", Ms. Mumbai befittingly replies "Mumbai". When she requests for his phone number, Mr. Pune mysteriously refuses, stating that she will forget it and they will never meet again nevertheless, so they should just remember this day instead.

As Mr. Pune exits the railway station, Ms. Mumbai, at last, receives a phone call on her mobile phone from Hridaymardam, who requests her to meet her outside the railway station before her train leaves. She agrees and walks out to find Mr. Pune (who is unable to start his scooter), with no sign of Hridaymardam around. When Ms. Mumbai explains why she is outside instead of waiting for her train, Mr. Pune expresses surprise and teases her over her eagerness to meet Hridaymardam despite her earlier refusals for marriage, and states that he is certain that she has changed her opinion about Hridaymardam, making her blush. However, as Hridaymardam does not show up, Ms. Mumbai requests Mr. Pune for his mobile phone to contact him again. He instructs her to search the second entry below her own phone number in the outgoing call list. Ms. Mumbai dials it and receives a busy signal again. Thus, decides to leave, already having left the explanation letter in Mr. Pune's possession. However, in a moment of realisation, she turns back and questions him how he had her number in his outgoing call list when she never ever gave it to him in the first place. Here, in a twisted ending, it is revealed that Mr. Pune is himself, in fact, Hridaymardam, the one who she had originally arrived to meet and ended up unknowingly spending the entire day with. As Ms. Mumbai digests this surprising information, Mr. Pune explains to her how she coincidentally approached him in the morning and requested him for directions to his own address, and how he decided to complicitly play along to get to know her. Mr. Pune proceeds to not only confess his love for Ms. Mumbai, but also propose to her for marriage. She responds by stating that she will let him know her decision after she discusses this matter with her mother (though her blushes and coy behaviour clearly indicate that the answer is a "yes"), and runs away to the railway platform for her train. The film ends with Ms. Mumbai trying to board her moving train and Mr. Pune running behind her to ensure that she boards safely as the credits roll.

== Cast ==
- Swapnil Joshi as Mr. Pune / Hridaymardam
- Mukta Barve as Ms. Mumbai
- Mohit Gokhale as Chhotya (one of Mr. Pune's friends with whom he plays cricket)

Mr. Pune and Ms. Mumbai's names are later revealed to be "Gautam Shekhar Pradhan" and "Gauri Ashok Deshpande", respectively, in the first sequel, Mumbai-Pune-Mumbai 2 (2015).

== Production ==
The shooting of the film is done at various locations in Pune and around. Popular tourist attractions like Tulshibaug, Mahatma Phule Mandai, Sarasbaug, Sinhagad Fort, Dagadusheth Halwai Ganapati Temple, Pune Railway Station, and various streets like Z Bridge, JM (Jangli Maharaj) road, City Pride Kothrud, and Necklace road Pashan in Pune are witnessed in the film. Another interesting fact is that in the complete film, Joshi and Barve exceptionally wear the same costume. There are no different costumes as it is the story of a day in the life of "Ms. Mumbai" (i.e. Barve) and "Mr. Pune" (i.e. Joshi). Later, Joshi stated in an interview that although Mumbai-Pune-Mumbai was a romantic film, it had no characteristics of a classical romantic film.

== Soundtrack ==
Mumbai-Pune-Mumbai

Soundtrack album by Avinash-Vishwajeet
- Released: May 2010
- Genre: Film soundtrack
- Length: 17:58
- Label: Everest Talkies

Avinash-Vishwajeet chronology
Aaicha Gondhal (2008)	Mumbai-Pune-Mumbai (2010)	Sambha - Aajcha Chhavaa (2012)

The lyrics for the film were penned by Shrirang Godbole, with music composed by Avinash-Vishwajeet

No.	Title	Singer(s)	Length
1	"Kadhi Tu"	Hrishikesh Ranade	5:41
2	"Ka Kalena" (Duet)	Swapnil Bandodkar, Bela Shende	4:09
3	"Ka Kalena" (Male Version)	Swapnil Bandodkar	4:03
4	"Ka Kalena" (Female Version)	Bela Shende	4:05

== Sequels ==
A sequel of the film titled Mumbai-Pune-Mumbai 2 was released on 12 November 2015. The third installment of the film Mumbai-Pune-Mumbai 3 was released on 7 December 2018. It has Swapnil Joshi and Mukta Barve in the lead roles.

== Remakes ==
It was remade in Hindi in 2014 as Mumbai Delhi Mumbai, in Kannada as Pyarge Aagbittaite, in Telugu as Made in Vizag and in Punjabi as Chandigarh Amritsar Chandigarh. In Gujarati, it is remade as "Taari Saathe".

== See also ==
- Mumbai-Pune-Mumbai 2
- Avinash–Vishwajeet
