= Shivani Raghuvanshi =

Indian actress (born 1991)

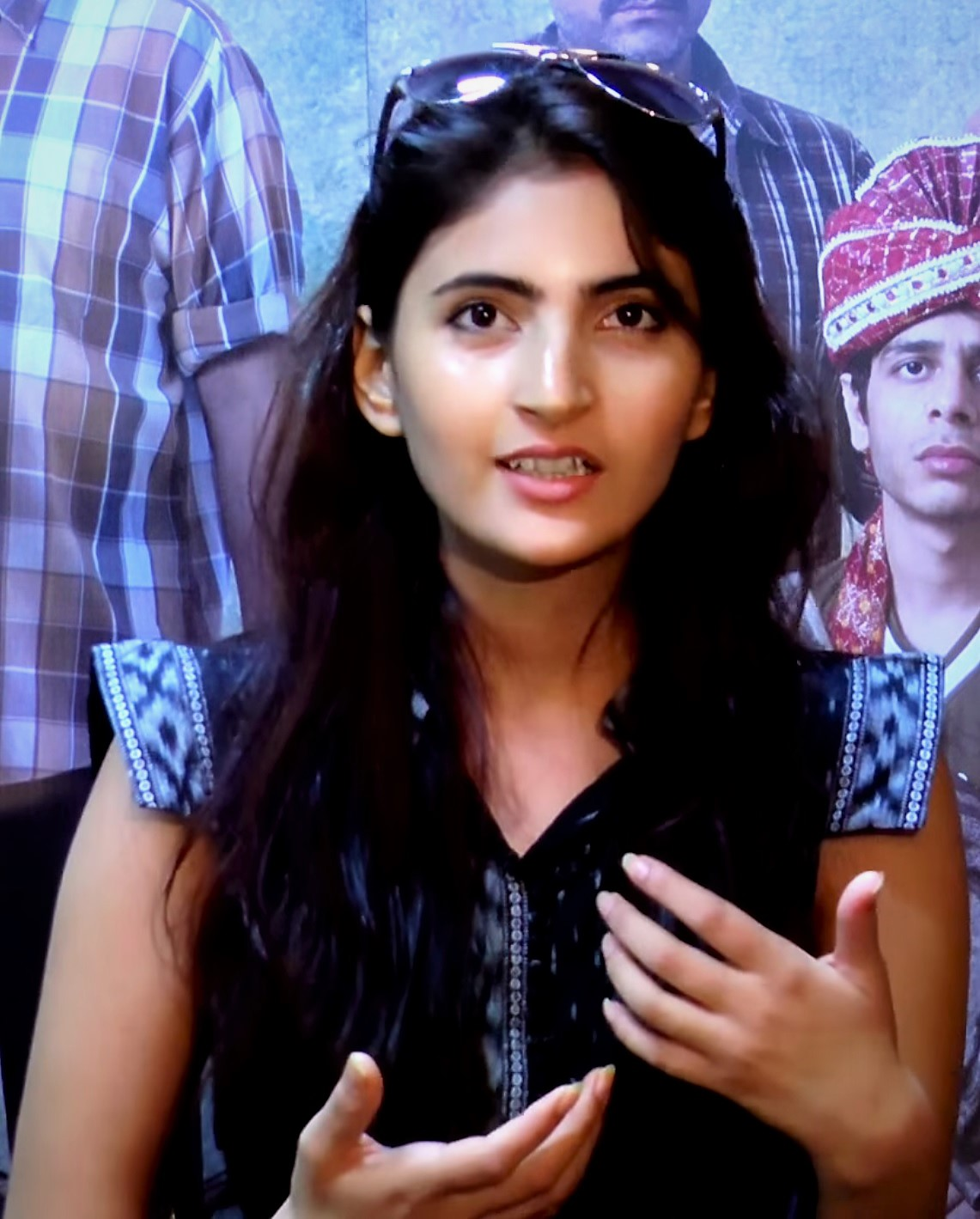
- Shivani Raghuvanshi interviewed in 2015
- Born: 19 June 1991 (age 35); Delhi, India
- Education: Sri Guru Tegh Bahadur Khalsa College
- Occupation: Actor

Shivani Raghuvanshi is an Indian actress. She made her acting debut in the 2014 dark comedy Titli, she earned wider recognition for her role in the webseries Made in Heaven.

== Filmography ==
- Shockers (TV Series)
- Jaan The Jigar (Short Movie)
- Jutti, The Shoe (Short Movie) (2018)
- Angrezi Mein Kehte Hain
- Titli (2014)
- Posham Pa (2019)
- Devi (Short movie)
- Baatein (short film)
- Comedy Circus (2018)
- Made in Heaven (2019) (TV Series) as Jaspreet "Jazz" Kaur
- Raat Akeli Hai (2020)
- Murder In Mahim (2024)
- Zindaginama (2024)
- Dupahiya (2025) (TV Series) as Roshni Jha

== Awards ==
- Most Promising Newcomer Female (22nd Screen Awards)
