= Mumbai-Pune-Mumbai 2 =

2015 film by Satish Rajwade

- Theatrical release poster
- Directed by: Satish Rajwade
- Written by: Satish Rajwade
- Screenplay by: Ashwini Shende (also dialogues)
- Produced by: Yashila Enterprises Pvt. Ltd.
- Starring: Swapnil Joshi; Mukta Barve; Prashant Damle; Mangal Kenkre; Vijay Kenkre; Savita Prabhune; Asawari Joshi; Shruti Marathe; Suhas Joshi; Angad Mhaskar
- Cinematography: Suhas Gujarathi
- Edited by: Rajesh Rao
- Music by: Avinash-Vishwajeet
- Production company: Yashlita Enterprises Pvt. Ltd.
- Distributed by: Mirah Entertainment; Everest Entertainment; Eros International
- Release date: 12 November 2015
- Running time: 152 minutes
- Country: India
- Language: Marathi
- Budget: ₹4 crores
- Box office: ₹18 crores

Mumbai-Pune-Mumbai 2: Lagnala Yaychach! (translation: Mumbai-Pune-Mumbai 2: You have to attend the marriage!) is a 2015 Indian Marathi-language romantic comedy drama film directed by Satish Rajwade and distributed by Eros International. The film is the second installment of the Mumbai-Pune-Mumbai film series before its prequel titled Mumbai-Pune-Mumbai (2010), and was followed by a sequel titled Mumbai-Pune-Mumbai 3 (2018). Released on 12 November 2015, the film stars an ensemble cast of Swapnil Joshi, Mukta Barve, Prashant Damle, Mangal Kenkre, Vijay Kenkre, Savita Prabhune, Asawari Joshi, Shruti Marathe, Suhas Joshi, and Angad Mhaskar. The screenplay and the dialogues were written by Ashwini Shende. The score and soundtrack album of the film are composed by Avinash-Vishwajeet with lyrics are penned by Shrirang Godbole, Ashwini Shende and Vishwajeet Joshi and cinematography by Suhas Gujarathi. Subhash Nakashe is the film's choreographer while the editing was done by Rajesh Rao. The principal photography began in February 2015 and the film marks as the most awaited film in the Marathi cinema. It is remade in Telugu as Happy Wedding (2018).

== Synopsis ==
The film begins where the first part ended. Gautam and Gauri, the polar opposites from Pune and Mumbai, are the most unusual of couples - Gautam is ice, while Gauri is fire; Gautam is calm in the most distressing situations, while Gauri has a bad temper and confused mind to deal with; Gautam is a Punekar, while Gauri is a Mumbaikar. Considering all the differences, this marriage of fire and ice seems to be the most unlikely thing, but Gautam and Gauri begin treading the path. On the way, they learn more about each other and each other's families. While marriage preparations are in full swing for Gautam and Gauri, there is a lingering doubt in Gauri's mind though. Gauri is still uncertain whether she wishes to go further with the relationship due to the misunderstandings between them. This adds to the arrival of Gauri's ex-boyfriend, Arnav, whereas Gautam has made his mind that he is ready for big day. Will this marriage succeed?

== Cast ==
- Swapnil Joshi as Gautam Shekhar Pradhan
- Mukta Barve as Gauri Ashok Deshpande / Gauri Gautam Pradhan
- Prashant Damle as Shekhar Amar Pradhan (Gautam's father)
- Mangal Kenkre as Mrs. Shekhar Pradhan (Gautam's mother)
- Vijay Kenkre as Ashok Deshpande (Gauri's father)
- Savita Prabhune as Sunanda Ashok Deshpande (Gauri's mother)
- Asawari Joshi as Neerja Mavshi (Gauri's maternal aunt)
- Suhas Joshi as Suhasini "Suhas" Amar Pradhan (Gautam's grandmother)
- Angad Mhaskar as Arnav (Gauri's boyfriend)
- Shruti Marathe as Tanuja (Gauri's cousin)
- Rupal Nand as Rashmi Ashok Deshpande (Gauri's sister)

== Production ==
=== Development ===
“Some stories deserve a sequel and they say that true love stories never have a happy ending... because they never end! Mumbai-Pune-Mumbai is a story which we all feel deserves a sequel, deserves to be told further”."

— Amit Bhanushali, Producer of the film posted on social media

Following the positive response to Mumbai-Pune-Mumbai post release in June 2010, the makers considered creating a sequel in order to carry the story forward portraying the next chapter of their marriage. The lead couple Mukta Barve and Swapnil Joshi reprises their roles from original, while Prashant Damle, Mangal Kenkre, Vijay Kenkre, Savita Prabhune, Asawari Joshi, Shruti Marathe, Suhas Joshi, and Angad Mhaskar are all new additions to the cast.

== Soundtrack ==
Mumbai Pune Mumbai 2

Soundtrack album by Avinash-Vishwajeet
- Released: 2 November 2015
- Genres: Feature film soundtrack, Gazal
- Length: 24:04
- Language: Marathi
- Label: Everest Entertainment

Avinash-Vishwajeet chronology
Classmates (2015)	Mumbai Pune Mumbai 2 (2015)

Singles from Mumbai-Pune-Mumbai 2
- 1. "Saath De" Released: 9 October 2015.

Avinash-Vishwajeet, the composers for Mumbai-Pune-Mumbai, will return to compose music and background score for the sequel with lyrics were written by Shrirang Godbole, Ashwini Shende, Sangeeta Barve, and Vishwajeet Joshi.

The single song "Saath De Tu Mala" released as a teaser on 30 September 2015 and the full track was released on 13 October 2015. The song was sung by Hrishikesh Ranade and Bela Shende, and written by Ashwini Shende and Vishwajeet Joshi.

The second song "Band Baaja Varaat Ghoda" was released as a teaser on 26 October 2015 and published on YouTube. and the full track was released on 27 October 2015. The song was sung by Bela Shende, Aanandi Joshi, Suresh Wadkar, and Hrishikesh Ranade and lyrics are penned by Sangeeta Barve, Srirang Godbole, and Vishwajeet Joshi. The third song "Mala Sanga Sukh Mhanje Nakki Kaay Asta" was released on 2 November 2015. The song is original from a Marathi play "Eka Lagnachi Goshta" and it is used in the film, the song is considered as one of the famous songs in Marathi theatre. The song is originally sung by Prashant Damle, while the lyrics were penned by Shrirang Godbole and composed by Ashok Patki.

Track list
No.	Title	Lyrics	Music	Singer(s)	Length
1.	"Saath De Tu Mala"	Ashwini Shende, Vishwajeet Joshi	Avinash-Vishwajeet	Hrishikesh Ranade, Bela Shende	4:03
2.	"Band Baaja Varaat Ghoda"	Sangeeta Barve, Srirang Godbole, Vishwajeet Joshi	Avinash-Vishwajeet	Bela Shende, Aanandi Joshi, Suresh Wadkar and Hrishikesh Ranade	5:52
3.	"Mala Sanga Sukh Mhanje Nakki Kay Asta"	Shrirang Godbole	Ashok Patki	Prashant Damle	1:35
4.	"Saadh Hi Preetichi"	Spruha Joshi	Avinash-Vishwajeet	Bela Shende, Swapnil Bandodkar	5:10
5.	"Let's Go Baby"	Vishwajeet Joshi, Farhad Bhiwandiwala	Avinash-Vishwajeet	Shikha Jain	3:08
6.	"Kaisi Ye Teri Preet"	Vishwajeet Joshi	Avinash-Vishwajeet	Javed Ali	5:32
Total length:					24:04

== Release ==
=== Marketing ===
The first look of the film's official motion logo released on 17 July 2015 on YouTube. The films official small teaser released on YouTube on 24 July 2015. The official trailer released on 15 September 2015. The video song of the track "Saath De Tu Mala" was premiered on 13 October 2015. The "Band Baja" song video premiere was released on 27 October 2015. The "Mala Sanga" video song was released on 2 November 2015.

=== Distribution ===
The film was released in Maharashtra, Karnataka, Goa, Gujarat, Madhya Pradesh and in international circuits like San Francisco on 12 November 2015 with English subtitles with 587 screens which after tremendous response increased to 680. The film is distributed by Eros International. The makers are planning to release the film in Qatar, Dubai, United States, England and Australia soon.

== Reception ==
The film has received positive reviews. ABP Majha gave 3.5 out of 5 stars and declared movie 'A light-hearted romantic movie'. Pune Mirror gave 3.5 out of 5 stars and declared movie 'Back with a welcome change'. Maharashtra Times gave 4 out of 5 stars and declared movie 'emotional joyride'. Times of India gave 3 out of 5 stars. Wedding Planning MarketPlace Website marketforshaadi.com also provided positive review appreciating the movie story.

== Box office ==
It collected ₹3 crore (US$310,000) in first 3 days and collected ₹4.02 crore (US$420,000) in its 4-days extended weekend. It collected ₹7 crore (US$730,000) nett in first week. The film was loved by local Marathi crowd in many parts of Mumbai and Pune because of this movie's connection with these two cities.

== See also ==
- Highest grossing Marathi films
