= Y (2022 film) =

- Theatrical release poster
- Directed by: Ajit Suryakant Wadikar
- Written by: Ajit Wadikar; Swapneel Sojwal; Sandip Dandawate
- Starring: Mukta Barve; Prajakta Mali; Sandeep Pathak
- Cinematography: Rakesh K Bhilare
- Edited by: Jayant Jathar
- Music by: Parag Chhabra
- Production company: Ctrln Production Pvt.Ltd
- Distributed by: AA Films
- Release date: 24 June 2022
- Running time: 153 minutes
- Country: India
- Language: Marathi

Y is a 2022 Indian Marathi-language thriller film directed by Ajit Suryakant Wadikar, written by Ajit Wadikar, Swapneel Sojwal and Sandip Dandawate. Executive Producer of the film is Viraj Vinay Munot It features Mukta Barve, Nandu Madhav, Prajakta Mali, Omkar Govardhan, Sandeep Pathak, Sandeep Dandawate, Rohit Kokate, Suhas Sirsath. The film was screened at MAMI Festival in 2019 and was released in theatres on 24 June 2022. Ajit Wadikar won Bhalji Pendharkar Best Director award and The film won the Maharashtra State Film Award for Best Film at 57th Maharashtra State Film Awards.

== Plot ==
Story of the film Dr. Aarti Deshmukh revolves around a medical officer. Aarti, a mother of a daughter, is tasked with investigating the medical systems involved in female foeticide. In front of the conscientious Aarti who does his job well, Dr. Purushottam stands as a challenge. Despite many attempts, Aarti does not find any evidence against Purushottam. Purushottam eventually uses his powers to transfer Aarti, but in the days remaining before the transfer, Aarti takes up the task of gathering evidence.

== Cast ==
- Mukta Barve as Dr. Aarti Deshmukh
- Prajakta Mali as Reema
- Omkar Govardhan as Arjun
- Sandeep Pathak as Siddhu
- Nandu Madhav as Dr. Purshottam
- Sandip Dandawate as Dinesh
- Rohit Kokate as Bashir
- Rasika Chavan
- Pradeep Bhosale
- Suhas Sirsat as Munna Mauli
- Nitin Bansode as Naresh

== Reception ==
=== Critical reception ===
Y film received positive reviews from critics. Kalpeshraj Kubal of The Times of India gave the film 3 stars out of 5 and wrote "Y, which derives its name from the Y is a film that conveys an important message and should be watched for that". Keyur Seta of Cinestaan.com also gave it 3 stars out of 5 and similarly found that "But what really stops this good film from being superlative is the abrupt climax. In fact, when the end credits start rolling, it becomes difficult to believe that the film has ended". A reviewer from Maharashtra Times gave the film a rating of 3/5 and wrote "This movie will surely enlighten you. The movie is also satisfactory in technical terms. The background score is especially good". Vishal Ghatge of ABP Majha also gave it 3 stars out of 5 and wrote "It would have worked even if it had not been told from the very first frame that this movie is a commentary on a serious topic. Without simplifying everything, some things should have been left for the audience to understand".

== Awards ==
- 2024: Won – Maharashtra State Film Award for Best Film
- 2023: Won – Aaryans Sanman for Best Film
- 2023: Won – Aaryans Sanman for Best Screenplay – Ajit Wadikar, Swapneel Sojwal
- 2023: Won – Aaryans Sanman for Best Actor (Special Mention) – Nandu Madhav
- 2023: Won – Aaryans Sanman for Best Editor – Jayant Jathar
- 2023 6TH MAJJA DIGITAL AWARD - Best Supporting Actress - Prajakta Mali.
