= Maati Maay =

Maati Maay (A Grave-Keeper's Tale) is a Marathi social drama film directed and produced by Chitra Palekar based on Baayen, a story by Bengali novelist Mahasweta Devi. This film was released on 17 March 2007 under the banner of Dnya Films. This was Nandita Das's Marathi cinema Debut and she received Maharashtra State Film Awards as best actress in 2007.

== Plot ==
The movie revolves around the story of human relationships and the superstitions of a patriarchal society. Chandi is a young woman from a lower caste, whose family has traditionally been in charge of a children's graveyard. After the death of her father Chandi inherits the job in the graveyard. She performs the unpleasant task of burying the village's children which affects her body and mind. Her husband, Narsu, fails to understand Chandi's state of mind; society forces her to continue the job. Finally, Chandi rebels and her community become extremely hostile to her.

== Cast ==
- Nandita Das as Chandi
- Mukta Barve as Yashoda
- Atul Kulkarni as Narsu
- Kshitij Gavande as Bhagirath
