= Satish Rajwade =

Indian film director and writer (Born January 1973)

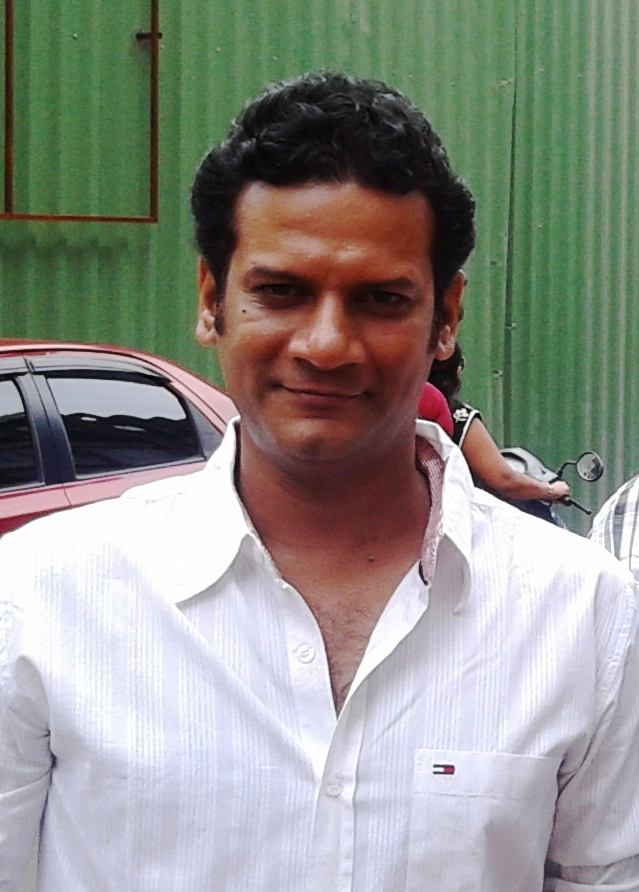
- Born: 9 January 1973 (age 53)
- Occupations: director, writer, actor
- Spouse: Pallavi Rajwade
- Children: Hruditya Rajwade, Yohana Rajwade

Satish Rajwade (born 9 January 1973) is an Indian Marathi film and television director and writer. He has also acted in few Hindi films and Marathi television series.

== Career ==
Rajwade started his career with acting in various Hindi and Marathi films along with theatre. He then moved to television as a director and writer. He has also worked as an assistant to director Govind Nihalani.

Rajwade got interested in acting after mother sent him to an acting workshop for kids during his summer. To pursue a career in acting, he joined Mithibai College, Vile Parle. During his college years, he acted in 75 one-act plays for his college in Marathi, Hindi, English as well as Gujarati for which he won many awards including the INT Best Actor in a Comic Role award for a Marathi one-act play Aambaa. The Best Comic Actor award fetched Satish Rajwade a role in his first professional play Tur Tur by Kedar Shinde. But his first big break came when he was spotted by Mahesh Manjrekar and Mohan Wagh and was offered a role in All The Best, which had 890 shows. A casting director spotted Satish Rajwade during one of these performances and offered him a role in a Hindi film. Rajwade then went on to play small roles in various Hindi Films like Sanshodhan, Hazaar Chaurasi Ki Maa, Nidaan, Vaastav and Josh. Rajwade then started working in the editing studios of B.R.Chopra without a salary for almost a year. Soon he wanted to be a director. Along with his friend Naveen Upadhyay, he directed his first pilot episode starring Mohan Joshi and Reema Lagoo. Blaze Music Company liked their work and offered him to direct a music video Na Jaane Kyun starring model Sameer Dharmadhikari which became an instant hit on the music charts.

Pleased with the success of the music video, Blaze Music Company CEOs offered to let Satish Rajwade direct the marathi movie, Mrugjal, which went on to bag 23 awards.

Rajwade went on to direct his first serial Duniyadari, for Zee Marathi, which was followed by Kinara and Reshim Gaathi. He co-directed Oon Pawus for which he also won the Ma. Ta. Sanmaan Best Director award. He then directed Asambhav and later went on to direct the first 30 episodes of Weg on Saam Marathi. He later directed Agnihotra on Star Pravah and Guntata Hriday He & Eka Lagnachi Dusri Goshta on Zee Marathi. He has also worked on many projects with actress Mukta Barve.

His latest film Badam Rani Gulam Chor is based on popular Marathi play Makdachya Haati Champagne (literally: Champagne in the hands of a monkey) and features Upendra Limaye, Mukta Barve, Pushkar Shotri and Anand Ingale in lead roles. His last release was Preamachi Goshta. He has also acted in movie Bhay and Time Barvait.

== Filmography ==
- Note: all work is in Marathi, unless otherwise noted.

=== As film director ===
Year	Title	Notes
2000	Mrugjal... Ek Naslela Astitva	Also editor and lyricist
2009	Ek Daav Dhobi Pachhad	
2009	Gaiir	
2010	Mumbai-Pune-Mumbai	
2012	Badam Rani Gulam Chor	
2013	Premachi Goshta	
2013	Popat	
2014	Sanngto Aika	
2014	Mumbai Delhi Mumbai	Hindi film
2015	Mumbai-Pune-Mumbai 2	
2017	Ti Saddhya Kay Karte	
2018	Aapla Manus	
2018	Mumbai-Pune-Mumbai 3	
2022	Autograph – Ek Japun Thevavi Ashi Lovestory	
2025	Premachi Goshta 2	

=== As an actor ===
Year	Title	Role	Notes
1998	Hazaar Chaurasi Ki Maa		Hindi film
1999	Vaastav: The Reality	Satya	Hindi film
2018	A Perfect Murder		Marathi Drama
2025	Asambhav †		

== Television ==
Year	Title	Notes
2009	Asambhav	As director
2010	Agnihotra	As director
2011	Guntata Hriday He	As director
2012	Eka Lagnachi Dusri Goshta	As director
2017	Rudram	
2019	Jeevlaga	As director
2020	Samantar	As director
