= Hrudayantar =

- Official poster
- Directed by: Vikram Phadnis
- Written by: Vikram Phadnis
- Screenplay by: Vikram Phadnis
- Produced by: Young Berry Entertainment; Imtiaz Khatri; Vikram Phadnis Productions; in association with TOABH Entertainment
- Starring: Subodh Bhave; Mukta Barve
- Cinematography: V. A. Dilshad
- Edited by: Ajit Devle
- Music by: Praful Karlekar
- Production company: Vikram Phadnis Productions
- Distributed by: AA Films
- Release date: 7 July 2017
- Running time: 135 mins
- Country: India
- Language: Marathi

Hrudayantar is an Indian Marathi-language drama film directed by Vikram Phadnis, produced by Young Berry Entertainment, Imtiaz Khatri, Purvesh Sarnaik and Vikram Phadnis Productions in association with TOABH Entertainment. The film stars Subodh Bhave and Mukta Barve in the lead roles.

This film also marks the directorial debut of Bollywood fashion designer Vikram Phadnis. It is the third collaboration of Barve and Bhave as previously they have worked together in the film Ek Daav Dhobi Pachhad and in the 2006 Marathi show Agnishikha. The film released on 7 July 2017. The film was Hrithik Roshan's debut Marathi film which he makes a guest appearance.

== Plot ==
Hrudayantar is an emotional drama that explores the marital crisis of a couple Shekhar Joshi (Subodh Bhave) and Samaira Joshi (Mukta Barve) married for over 12 years. They have two beautiful daughters Nitya (Trushnika Shinde) and Nysha (Nishtha Vaidya) who have been the glue to their brittle marriage all these years. Shekhar, a hotelier is a workaholic. With hardly any time to spare for his family, he believes that he can either give his family a luxurious life or spend quality time with them. Samaira on the other hand is also a working woman but being disciplined task master, manages her responsibilities towards her house, daughters and work with utmost skill. Her life mainly revolves around her daughters. Nitya, the elder between the two sisters loves to dance. Dancing is not only her passion but it means the world to her. Nysha on the contrary is an athlete in the making. Her love for outdoor sports makes her participate in every sport event at school. Hrudayanatar is the journey of the family and how through turbulent times the family learns and values relationships. Hrudayantar is about celebrating life.

== Cast ==
- Subodh Bhave as Shekhar Joshi
- Mukta Barve as Samaira Joshi
- Trushnika Shinde as Nitya Joshi
- Nishtha Vaidya as Nysha Joshi
- Meena Naik as Mrs. Deshmukh
- Sonali Khare as Ashwini
- Ameet Khedekar as Dr. Gaurang
- Meher Acharia Dar as Sister Jenny
- Monika Dharankar as Dr. Tanvi Godbole
- Atul Parchure as Mr. Aaglawe
- Vishakha Subhedar Mrs. Aaglawe
- Amol Bawdekar as Karthik
- Sonia Mann as Sonia

=== Guest appearances ===
- Hrithik Roshan as Krishna Mehra aka Krrish / Himself
- Shiamak Davar as himself
- Manish Paul as himself

== Production ==
The pre-production of the film started in November 2016. Mukta Barve and Subodh Bhave were cast as the leads. The film will be directed and produced by Vikram Phadnis under the banner of Vikram Phadnis Productions. This film is Phadnis' directorial debut in Marathi film industry. The film's cinematography will be by Dilshad V.A. The music direction of the film will be by Praful Karlekar and the lyrics will be penned by Mandar Cholkar.

== Reception ==
At the 2018 Filmfare Marathi Awards, the film received nomination in twelve categories: Best Film, Best Actor (Subodh Bhave), Best Actress (Mukta Barve), Best Director, Best Music (Praful Karlekar), Best Male Singer (Swapnil Bandodkar), Best Female Singer (Anandi Joshi), Best Costume, Best Art Direction, Best Debut Director, Best Story, and Best Screenplay; of which only Phadnis won the award in Best Costumes category.
