= Swapnil Bandodkar =

- Born: 17 May; Maharashtra, India
- Genres: Indian pop, playback singing
- Occupations: singer and Music Director
- Years active: 1999–present

Swapnil Bandodkar is a Marathi playback singer from India, popular for playback singing Marathi film and television world. He learnt music from Kunda Vaishampayan, Vasantrao Kulkarni and Suresh Wadkar. He won Maharashtra State Film Award for Best Male Playback Singer At 54th Maharashtra State Film Awards.

== Career ==
Swapnil was born in a Goan family in Mumbai. He has given performances in television, and various festivals in light and film music. He got nominated for Gadbad Gondhal in Ambarnath Film Festival in 2017 as Best Singer (Male). He was a contestant and winner of the first season of Sa Re Ga Ma in 1996.

== Film singing ==
- Chashme Bahaddar (2006)
- Yanda Kartavya Aahe
- Photocopy
- Kshan (2006)
- Timepass
- Lai Bhaari (2014)
- Zabardast
- Morya
- Jai Maharashtra Dhaba Bhatinda
- Zenda
- Sharyat
- Zapatlela 2
- Happy Journey
- Premachi Goshta
- Mitwaa
- Poshter Boyz
- Gadbad Gondhal
- Panipat
- The Kashmir Files

== Popular songs ==
- राधा हि बावरी Radha Hi Bavari
- गालावर खळी Galavar khali
- ओल्या सांजवेळी उन्हे Olya Sanjveli Unhe
- आला होळीचा सण लई भारी Aala Holicha San Lai Bhari
- का कळेना कोणत्या Ka Kalena Konatya
- मंद मंद करी धुंद धुंद हा Mand Mand kari Dhund Dhund Ha
- गणाधीशा Ganadhisha
- बाप्पा मोरया मोरया रे Bappa Moraya re
- घन आज बरसे मनावर Ghan Aaj Barse Manavar
- परी म्हणू की सुंदरा Pari Mhanu Ki Sundara
- मला वेड लागले प्रेमाचे Mala Ved Lagale Premache
- लख लख चंदेरी Lakh Lakh Chanderi
- वादळवाट Vadalvaat
- सारेगमप SaReGaMaPa
- सांग ना रे मना Sang Na Re Mana
- हा चंद्र तुझ्यासाठी Ha Chandra Tujhya Sathi
- दुर दुर चालली Dur dur chalali
- जीव गुंतला तुझ्यात Jeev guntala tuzyat
- उनाड पाऊस Unad paus
- स्वप्नातली तू परी Swapnatali Tu Pari
- जुळून येती रेशीमगाठी Julun Yeti Reshimgathi
- सावर रे एकदा, सावर रे Savar Re Ekda, Savar Re
- का सांग ना Ka Sang na
- ऐकावी वाटते स्पर्शातली Aikavi Vatate Sparshatali
- तू जिथे मी तिथे Tu Jithe Mi Tithe
- मला सांग ना रे मना Mala Sang Na Re Mana
- ही तुझी जादूगरी Hi Tujhi Jadugiri
- हे काय होते Hey Kay Hote

== Marathi songs ==
Year	Film	Songs	Composer	Co-singer(s)
2001	Akleche Kande	"Kshanokshani Tujhi Aathavan"	Sarang Ranade	Vaishali Samant
2004	Manini	"Tu Niragas Chandrama"	Ashok Patki	Bela Sulakhe
2004	Savarkhed Ek Gaon	"Hoshiyaar"	Ajay-Atul	Yogita Godbole
2005	Khabardar	"Dhumshyan Angat Aala"	Ashok Patki	Vaishali Samant
2005	Khabardar	"Payal Baje Cham Cham"	Ashok Patki	Vaishali Samant
2005	Khabardar	"Dil Ko Diya"	Ashok Patki	Hrishikesh Kamerkar
2006	Hee Porgi Kunachi	"Tula Nazar Na Lago"	Ashok Patki	Solo
2006	Yanda Kartavya Aahe	"Shwas Ha Tujha'	Nilesh Moharir	Solo
2006	Golmaal	"Pari Mhanu Ki Sundara"	Avadhoot Gupte	
2006	Kshan	"Fulane Rusave"	Kishor Ranade	Solo
2006	Kshan	"Kadhi Kase Kuthe"	Kishor Ranade	Solo
2006	Chashme Bahaddar	"Chala Holicha Khelala Rang"	Jitendra Kulkarni	Solo
2006	Akhand Saubhagyawati	"Aali Aali Ho Diwali Aali"	Padmaja Phenany Joglekar	Sadhana Sargam, Padmaja Phenany Joglekar, Mandar Parkhi
2007	Zabardast	"Aaicha Gho"	Ajay-Atul	Ajay Gogavale
2007	Zabardast	"Hum Aaye Hain"	Ajay-Atul	Amruta Natu
2007	Zabardast	"Ye Na Priye"	Ajay-Atul	Amruta Natu
2007	Nasheebachi Aishi Taishi	"Din Bandhu"	Pravin Kunvar	Solo
2008	Madhu Ithe Choughe Tithe	"Madhu Ithe Choughe Tithe"	Aniruddha Kale	Kavita Joshi-Manik
2009	Houn Jau De	"Vitthal Vitthal"	Pravin Kunvar	Ravindra Sathe
2010	Zenda	"Sang Na Re Mana"	Avadhoot Gupte	Nihira Joshi
2010	Zenda	"Antari Vajati"	Avadhoot Gupte	Nihira Joshi
2010	Mumbai-Pune-Mumbai	"Ka Kalena"	Avinash–Vishwajeet	Bela Shende
2010	Mumbai-Pune-Mumbai	"Ka Kalena Male Version"	Avinash–Vishwajeet	Solo
2010	Popat	"Ka Shwaas Ha"	Avinash–Vishwajeet	Solo
2010	Durga Mhantyat Mala	"Swapnat Rang Bhartana"	Pravin Kunvar	Vaishali Samant
2010	Huppa Huiyya	"Huppa Huiyya Jai Bajranga"	Ajit-Sameer	Solo
2010	Huppa Huiyya	"Vakada Tikda"	Ajit-Sameer	Neha Rajpal
2011	Mohan Aawatey	"Mohan Aawatey"	Aniruddha Kale	Solo
2011	Mohan Aawatey	"Sajuni Ashi Tu"	Aniruddha Kale	Neha Rajpal
2011	Sharyat	"Mala Sang Na"	Chinar-Mahesh	Mahalakshmi Iyer
2011	Morya	"Tuch Majhi Aai Deva"	Avadhoot Gupte	Avadhoot Gupte, Dnyaneshwar Meshram
2011	Morya	"Hey Lambodar"	Avadhoot Gupte	Avadhoot Gupte, Farid Sabri, Janhavi Prabhu Arora
2011	Morya	"Govinda Re Gopala"	Avadhoot Gupte	Avadhoot Gupte
2011	Morya	"Utsavatla Raja"	Avadhoot Gupte	Avadhoot Gupte, Santosh Juvekar
2011	Fakta Ladh Mhana	"Tu Manat Tu"	Ajit-Sameer	Neha Rajpal, Ajit Parab
2012	Satrangi Re	"Swapnatali Tu Pari"	Ajay Naik	Swapnaja Lele
2012	Shree Partner	"Dayaghana"	Nilesh Moharir	Solo
2013	Jai Maharashtra Dhaba Bhatinda	"Avakhalse Rehash"	Nilesh Moharir	Solo
2013	Jai Maharashtra Dhaba Bhatinda	"Na Kale Kadhi"	Nilesh Moharir	Janhavi Prabhu Arora, Kalpana Shah
2013	Jai Maharashtra Dhaba Bhatinda	"Bolo Jithe Chaughada"	Nilesh Moharir	Avadhoot Gupte
2013	Jai Maharashtra Dhaba Bhatinda	"Ga Saajani"	Nilesh Moharir	Janhavi Prabhu Arora, Jawar Dildar
2013	Mangalashtak Once More	"Divas Olya Paklyanche"	Nilesh Moharir	Bela Shende
2013	Premachi Goshta	"Olya Saanj Veli"	Avinash-Vishwajeet	Bela Shende
2014	Timepass	"Mala Ved Lagale"	Chinar-Mahesh	Ketaki Mategaonkar
2014	Timepass	"Phulpakharu"	Chinar-Mahesh	Solo
2014	Lai Bhaari	"Aala Holicha San Lai Bhari"	Ajay–Atul	Yogita Godbole
2014	Poshter Boyz	"Deva Deva Kamal Bhari"	Milind Joshi	Bela Shende, Nandesh Umap
2014	Happy Journey	"Ka Sang Na"	Karan Kulkarni	Shreya Ghoshal
2014	Guru Pournima	"Aikavi Vatate"	Avinash-Vishwajeet	Bela Shende
2014	Guru Pournima	"Aikavi Vatate Male Version"	Avinash-Vishwajeet	Solo
2014	Ishq Wala Love	"Tu Dista Duet"	Avinash-Vishwajeet	Anandi Joshi, Mayur Jadhav
2014	Ishq Wala Love	"Tu Dista Male Version"	Avinash-Vishwajeet	Solo
2014	Ishq Wala Love	"Jeev Guntala"	Avinash-Vishwajeet	Bela Shende
2015	Mitwaa	"Dur Dur"	Avinash-Vishwajeet	Adarsh Shinde Bela Shende
2015	Mitwaa	"Savar Re Mana"	Avinash-Vishwajeet	Janhavi Prabhu Arora
2015	Sandook	"Chand Tu Nabhatla"	Ajit-Sameer	Solo
2015	Bhootacha Honeymoon	"Sari Rimzim Rimzim"	Pravin Kunvar	Solo
2015	Mumbai-Pune-Mumbai 2	"Saad Hi Preetichi"	Avinash–Vishwajeet	Bela Shende
2015	Kaakan	"Wedyancha Ghar Unhat"	Ajay Singha	Solo
2016	Nivdung	"Vitthala"	Rafique Shaikh	Solo
2016	Kanha	"Maar Kick Re Govinda"	Avadhoot Gupte	Avadhoot Gupte
2016	Laal Ishq	"Chand Matla"	Nilesh Moharir	Vaishali Samant
2016	Photocopy	"Tu Jithe Me Tithe"	Nilesh Moharir	Neha Rajpal
2017	Dashakriya	"Jagnyache Deva"	Amitraj	Solo
2017	Tula Kalnnaar Nahi	"Tula Kalnnaar Nahi"	Amitraj	Neha Rajpal
2017	Chi Va Chi Sau Ka	"Man He"	Narendra Bhide	Shreya Ghoshal
2017	Bhetali Tu Punha	"Harvu Jara"	Chinar-Mahesh	Aanandi Joshi
2017	Manus Ek Mati	"Sakhya Re Sajana"	Prashant-Amar	Neha Rajpal
2017	Fugay	"Kahi Kale Tula"	Nilesh Moharir	Janhavi Prabhu Arora
2018	Savita Damodar Paranjpe	"Velhala"	Nilesh Moharir	Solo
2018	Savita Damodar Paranjpe	"Jaadugiri"	Amitraj	Adarsh Shinde
2018	Ye Re Ye Re Paisa	"Khandala Ghat"	Amitraj	Avadhoot Gupte, Vaishali Samant
2019	Triple Seat	"Kon Jaane"	Avinash-Vishwajeet	Bela Shende
2019	Panipat	"Mard Maratha"	Ajay-Atul	Sudesh Bhosale, Kunal Ganjawala, Priyanka Barve, Padmanabh Gaikwad
2020	Make Up	"Laagena"	AV Prafullachandra	Solo
2022	The Kashmir Files	"Hum Dekhenge"	Swapnil Bandodkar	Salman Ali, Meghana Mishra, Shehzad Ali, Anaya Wadkar
2022	Coffee	"Urichya Vednela"	Trupti Chavan	Solo
2022	Ye Re Ye Re Pavsa	"Kaay Bi Kaay Bi"	Sushant Pawar, Kishor Pawar	Solo
2023	Phulrani	"Tuzya Sobatiche"	Nilesh Moharir	Aanandi Joshi
2026	Lagna Aani Barach Kahi	"Sakharpuda"	Vaishali Samant	Suresh Wadkar, Avdhoot Gupte, Vaishali Samant, Maithili Joshi, Avani Tushar Nannajkar
2026	Lagna Aani Barach Kahi	"Sobat Fifty Fifty"	Vaishali Samant	Vaishali Samant

== Awards ==
- Maharashtra State Film Award for Best Male Playback Singer for his song "Jagnyache deva" from film Dashakriya.
- Nominated - Fakt Marathi Cine Sanman for Best Playback Singer Male Tujhya Sobariche from film Phulrani
- The best singer award for his solo song 'Phulpakharu' from the movie Timepass

== Albums ==
- Jai Shri Krishna
- Mazhi Gaani – Swapnil Bandodkar vol 1
- Mazhi Gaani – Swapnil Bandodkarvol 2
- Bedhund
- Swapnanchya Gavi Java
- Tula Pahatana
- Mannmor
- Tichya Dolyatal Gaav
- Deep Chilo
- Tu Mazha Kinara
- Prasanna Ho Ambikem
- Sang Sang Ho Tum
- Tula Pahile
- Bappa Moraya re
