= Karaar =

- Directed by: Manoj Kotian
- Screenplay by: Hemant Edlabadkar
- Story by: Sanjay Jagtap
- Produced by: Poonam Sivia and Neelam Sivia
- Starring: Subodh Bhave; Urmila Kanitkar; Kranti Redkar
- Music by: Vijay Narayan Gavande and Paresh Shah
- Release date: 26 May 2017
- Country: India
- Language: Marathi

Karaar is a 2017 Marathi feature film directed by Manoj Kotian, and starring Subodh Bhave, Urmila Kothare, Kranti Redkar, Suhasini Mulay and Aarti More. The songs from the film are sung by Avdhoot Gupte, Shreya Ghoshal, Bela Shende, Sonu Kakkar, Jasraj Joshi, Neha Rajpal and Vaishali Samant.

== Cast ==
- Subodh Bhave
- Urmila Kanitkar
- Kranti Redkar
- Suhasini Mulay
- Aarti More

== Soundtrack ==
No.	Title	Singer(s)	Length
1.	"Sajana Re"	Shreya Ghoshal, Jasraj Joshi	5:24
2.	"Chuklya Wata"	Avadhoot Gupte, Sonu Kakkar	4:06
3.	"Tu Nave Sur"	Bela Shende	5:24
4.	"Wajati Tulaal"	Neha Rajpal	3:14
5.	"Mitha Halwa"	Vaishali Samant	3:53
