= Shikshanachya Aaicha Gho =

Shikshanacha Aaicha Gho
- Theatrical release poster
- Directed by: Mahesh Manjrekar
- Written by: Mahesh Manjrekar
- Produced by: Sanjay Chhabria; Ashwami Manjrekar; Satya Manjrekar
- Starring: Sachin Khedekar; Bharat Jadhav; Saksham Kulkarni; Gauri Vaidya; Siddharth Jadhav; Kranti Redkar; Vidyadhar Joshi; Vaibhav Mangle; Kamlakar Satpute; Kishore Pradhan; Sandeep Pathak; Vijay Kenkre; Atul Kale; Dhananjay Mandrekar; Rajdev Jamdade; Rajiv Rane
- Music by: Ajit-Atul-Sameer
- Production companies: Satya Films; Ashwami Productions; Everest Entertainment
- Distributed by: Everest Entertainment
- Release date: 15 January 2010
- Country: India
- Language: Marathi

Shikshanacha Aaicha Gho (transl. : To Hell With Studies) is a 2010 Indian Marathi comedy drama film directed by Mahesh Manjrekar starring Sachin Khedekar, Bharat Jadhav, Saksham Kulkarni, Gauri Vaidya, Siddharth Jadhav and Kranti Redkar. The film was released on 15 January 2010. The film's music was composed by the trio Ajit-Atul-Sameer. After Astitva with 10-year gap Mahesh Manjrekar directed the Marathi film. This film was later remade in Tamil and Telugu as Dhoni and in Punjabi as Son of Manjeet Singh.

== Synopsis ==
Shrinivas Rane is an average student, born with average academic intelligence, but when it comes to cricket he is a born genius. His extraordinary talent was lost on his father who like millions of other parents believed that a child's intellect is only reflected in their mark sheet, which eventually will give them a "secure future". So he begins his quest to make his son the brightest and best student in the world. But Shree can't handle this pressure and it reflects on his psyche deteriorating the relationship between father and son, upon which the father in a fit of anger does something that makes him repent later.

== Cast ==
- Sachin Khedekar as the Chief Minister
- Bharat Jadhav as Madhukar Rane
- Saksham Kulkarni as Shrinivas Rane
- Gauri Vaidya as Durga Rane
- Siddharth Jadhav as Ebrahim Bhai
- Kranti Redkar as Nalini
- Mahesh Manjrekar as Doctor

== Production ==
Shikshanacha Aaicha Gho was released in India on 15 January 2010.

== Music ==
Marathi music trio Ajit-Atul-Sameer scored the music. The soundtrack was released on 5 December 2009.

== Controversy ==
Maratha Mahasangh took an objection over the name "aaiycha". According to them, it was abusive and would hurt children. Later Manjrekar agreed to make a particular announcement before starting of film and the dispute ended.

== Remakes ==
Year	Film	Language	Cast	Director
2011	Cholo Paltai	Bengali	Prosenjit Chatterjee, Aryann Bhowmik, Tathoi Deb, Rajatava Dutta, Mouli Ganguly	Haranath Chakraborty
2012	Dhoni	Tamil and Telugu	Prakash Raj, Akash Puri, Radhika Apte, Brahmanandam, Nassar	Prakash Raj
2018	Son of Manjeet Singh	Punjabi	Gurpreet Ghuggi, B.N. Sharma, Karamjit Anmol, Japji Khaira, Tania	Vikram Grover
