= Vaishali Samant =

Indian playback singer

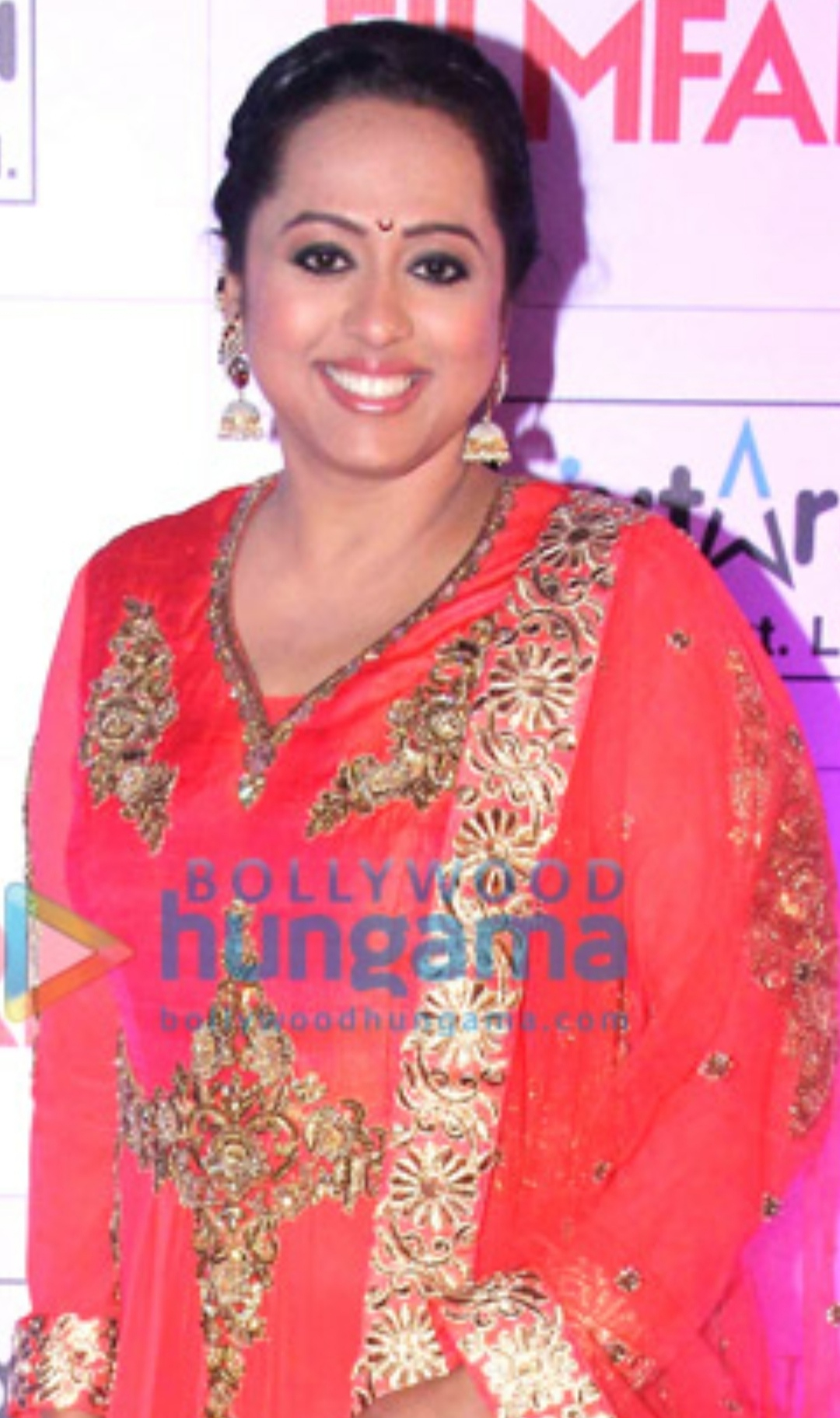
- Samant in 2014
- Born: 25 April 1974 (age 52); Bombay, Maharashtra, India
- Occupations: Singer, composer
- Years active: 1999 - present
- Spouse: Dattatreya Samant (m. 2000)
- Children: 1

Vaishali Samant is an Indian music composer, lyricist and playback singer who is popularly known for her work in the Marathi film and music industry. Her career on television has included being a judge on the reality singing competition shows. She has sung in Hindi, Bengali, Gujarati, Bhojpuri, Assamese, Tamil and Telugu languages. She has sung over 2000 songs in Marathi.

== Career ==
She has sung for music composers like A. R. Rahman in Lagaan, Taal, Saathiya and Chhaava. She has also sung for bollywood films like Padmashree Laloo Prasad Yadav, Girlfriend, Eight, Malamaal Weekly, Tujhe Meri Kasam, Chetna, Dil Jo Bhi Kahey..., Traffic Signal, Chamku, Mirch. Her most well known song is Chalka Re from Saathiya by A. R. Rahman. She was nominated for the Favorite Artist, India at the MTV Asia music awards in 2004. She was nominated for Gadbad Gondhal in Ambarnath Marathi Film Festival in 2017 as Best Singer (Female).,

She also sang several playback songs for Marathi films, composed by Marathi music directors including Ashok Patki, Bhaskar Chandavarkar, Anil Mohile, Ajay-Atul, Bal Palsule, Ajit Parab, Amitraj, Avadhoot Gupte, Nilesh Moharir and herself. she recorded duets with Swapnil Bandodkar, Anand Shinde, Suresh Wadkar, Sudesh Bhosale, Avadhoot Gupte and Adarsh Shinde.

== Filmography ==
=== Television ===
Year	Title	Role	Ref.
2006-2008	Sa Re Ga Ma Pa Marathi	Judge	
2008	Sa Re Ga Ma Pa Marathi Li'l Champs	Judge	
2020-2024	Mi Honar Superstar	Judge	

== Discography ==
=== Film songs ===
Year	Film	Language	Song	Co-singer
1999	Taal	Hindi	"Kya Dekh Rahe Ho Tum"	Shoma
2000	Alai Payuthey	Tamil	"Yaro Yarodi"	Mahalakshmi Iyer, Richa Sharma
2001	Lagaan	Hindi	"Radha Kaise Na Jale"	Asha Bhosle, Udit Narayan
2002	Saathiya	Hindi	"Chhalka Chhalka Re"	Mahalakshmi Iyer, Richa Sharma
2003	Kaise Kahoon Ke... Pyaar Hai	Hindi	"Kaise Kahoon Ke Pyaar Hain"	Udit Narayan, Kavita Krishnamurti
2003	Tujhe Meri Kasam	Hindi	"Mein Rok Loo"	Solo
2004	Girlfriend	Hindi	"Suno To Jaana Jaana"	Sunidhi Chauhan
2004	Pachhadlela	Marathi	"Rupaan Dekhni"	Rishikesh Kamerkar
2004	Aga Bai Arrecha!	Marathi	"Cham Cham Karta Hain"	Solo
2004	Soon Asavi Ashi	Marathi	"Sai Tujhe Naam"	Solo
2004	Soon Asavi Ashi	Marathi	"Aa Kareeb Aaja"	Solo
2004	Soon Asavi Ashi	Marathi	"Door Door Ya Lata Sange"	Solo
2005	Dil Jo Bhi Kahey...	Hindi	"C'est La Vie"	Sudesh Bhosale
2005	Home Delivery	Hindi	"Mere Tumhare Sabke Liye Happy Diwali"	Suraj Jagan, Sunidhi Chauhan
2005	Sarivar Sari	Marathi	"Kunya Gavachi "	Solo
2005	Jatra: Hyalagaad Re Tyalagaad	Marathi	"Kombadi Palali"	Anand Shinde
2005	Khabardar	Marathi	"Dhumshyan Angaat Aala"	Swapnil Bandodkar
2005	Khabardar	Marathi	"Payal Baje Cham Cham"	Swapnil Bandodkar
2005	Pak Pak Pakaak	Marathi	"Tujh Lageen Saalu"	Yash Narvekar
2005	Padmashree Laloo Prasad Yadav	Hindi	"Chidiya Chidiya"	Mahesh Manjrekar
2005	Padmashree Laloo Prasad Yadav	Hindi	"Aaunga Na Peeche Peeche"	Abhijeet Bhattacharya
2006	Malamaal Weekly	Hindi	"Kismat Se Chalti Hai"	Nitin Raikwar
2006	Malamaal Weekly	Hindi	"Hansini O Meri Hansini Remix"	Solo
2006	Gadhvacha Lagna	Marathi	"Mi Chhattis Nakhrewali"	Solo
2006	Sasarchi Ka Maherchi	Marathi	"Aarshat Mi Baghte"	Solo
2006	Sasarchi Ka Maherchi	Marathi	"Jhali Najra Nazar"	Solo
2006	Sasarchi Ka Maherchi	Marathi	"Maitrinino Navrila Halad Lawa"	Solo
2006	Golmaal	Marathi	"Hi Gulabi Hawa"	Swapnil Bandodkar
2006	Yanda Kartavya Aahe	Marathi	"Aabhaas Ha"	Rahul Vaidya
2007	Bakula Namdeo Ghotale	Marathi	"Aivaj Hawali Kela"	Tyagraj Khadilkar
2007	Bakula Namdeo Ghotale	Marathi	"Mi Sataryachi Gulchadi"	Devdatta Sable
2007	Bakula Namdeo Ghotale	Marathi	"Man Jhurtay"	Devdatta Sable, Rohan Pradhan
2007	Saade Maade Teen	Marathi	"777 Rupaye"	Avadhoot Gupte, Rishikesh Kamerkar
2007	Bharat Aala Parat	Marathi	"Main Nasheeli Naar"	Madhava Bhagwat
2007	Tula Shikwin Changlach Dhada	Marathi	"Rani Majhya Malyamandi"	Avadhoot Gupte
2007	Nana Mama	Marathi	"Majhi Lakhachi Daulat"	Solo
2007	Karz Kunkuvache	Marathi	Aag Petli Aag	Solo
2007	Traffic Signal	Hindi	"Aai Ga"	Solo
2008	Full 3 Dhamaal	Marathi	"Tandoori Paaplet"	Solo
2008	Gondya Martay Tangda	Marathi	"Premacha Vara Angat Shirlay Ga"	Avadhoot Gupte
2008	Gondya Martay Tangda	Marathi	Nashib Aamcha Khotta	Sadhna Sargam
2008	Galgale Nighale	Marathi	"Navri Mandwakhali "	Anand Shinde
2008	Sakhha Savatra	Marathi	"Mohile Majha Man Tu	Suresh Wadkar
2008	Sakhha Savatra	Marathi	"Aala Holicha Re San"	Suresh Wadkar
2008	Sakhha Savatra	Marathi	"Ha Shahari Chavat Bhunga"	Solo
2008	Oxygen Jeev Gudmartoy	Marathi	"Turuturu Chalu Nako"	Anand Shinde
2008	Oxygen Jeev Gudmartoy	Marathi	"Navachi Gojiri"	Solo
2008	Chamku	Hindi	"Gola Gola"	Abhijeet Bhattacharya
2009	Zenda	Marathi	"Nakhwa"	Solo
2009	Zenda	Marathi	"Patil Aala"	Solo
2009	Master Eke Master	Marathi	"Naadkhula"	Solo
2010	Mirch	Hindi	"Zindagi Tu Hi Bata"	Kunal Ganjawala
2010	Durga Mhantyat Mala	Marathi	"Swapnat Rang Bhartana"	Swapnil Bandodkar
2010	Huppa Huiyya	Marathi	"Halla Halla"	Avadhoot Gupte
2011	Arjun	Marathi	"Majhya Dolyatil Kajal"	Solo
2012	Teen Bayka Fajiti Aika	Marathi	"Ishkachi Batli"	Solo
2012	Teen Bayka Fajiti Aika	Marathi	"Ek Chumma De Na Gade"	Anand Shinde
2012	Mokala Shwaas	Marathi	"Ek Hirava Hirava Swapna"	Solo
2013	Zapatlela 2	Marathi	"Kaljat Mukkam Kela"	Solo
2013	Zapatlela 2	Marathi	"Gajmukha Version 1"	Avadhoot Gupte
2013	Zapatlela 2	Marathi	"Gajmukha Version 2"	Avadhoot Gupte, Swapnil Bandodkar
2013	Mangalashtak Once More	Marathi	"Navri Ni Navryachi Swaari"	Avadhoot Gupte
2013	Superstar	Marathi	"Latak Matak"	Avadhoot Gupte
2014	Ishq Wala Love	Marathi	"Ase Koni"	Vishwajeet Joshi
2014	Ishq Wala Love	Marathi	"Bhui Bhuijali"	Aanandi Joshi
2014	Raakhandaar	Marathi	"Tujhya Mule"	Rohit Raut
2015	Tu Hi Re	Marathi	"Gulabachi Kali"	Amitraj, Urmila Dhangar
2015	Bhootacha Honeymoon	Marathi	"Sari Rim Zim Rim Zim"	Swapnil Bandodkar
2015	Dholki	Marathi	"Dhin Tang"	Adarsh Shinde
2015	Aga Bai Arechyaa 2	Marathi	"Dil Mera"	Solo
2016	Majha Naav Shivaji	Marathi	"Dil Yeh Mera"	Solo
2016	Laal Ishq	Marathi	"Chaand Matla"	Swapnil Bandodkar
2016	Chahato Mi Tula	Marathi	"Nave Janma Ghyave"	Sairam Iyer
2016	Photocopy	Marathi	"Pipani"	Pravin Kuvar
2016	Kanha	Marathi	"Krishna Janmala"	Avadhoot Gupte
2017	Thank U Vitthala	Marathi	"Mobile"	Avadhoot Gupte
2017	Chhand Priticha	Marathi	"Sawaal Jawaab"	Bela Shende
2018	Gadbad Gondhal	Marathi	"Sang Na"	Solo
2018	Gadbad Gondhal	Marathi	"Alis Tu"	Solo
2018	Kalari	Tamil	"Kedaya"	Prasanna
2018	Farzand	Marathi	"Tumhi Yetana Kela Ishara"	Solo
2018	Ye Re Ye Re Paisa	Marathi	"Khandala Ghaat"	Swapnil Bandodkar, Avadhoot Gupte
2019	Girlz	Marathi	"Aaichya Gaavat"	Kavita Raam, Mugdha Karhade
2019	Bandishala	Marathi	"Petla Laal Diva"	Solo
2019	Luckee	Marathi	"Kopcha"	Bappi Lahiri
2021	Jhimma	Marathi	"Jhimma Title Song"	Mugdha Karhade, Aarti Kelkar, Suhas Joshi
2021	Pandu	Marathi	"Bhurum Bhurum"	Avadhoot Gupte
2022	Timepass 3	Marathi	" Waghachi Darkali "	Solo
2022	Faas	Marathi	"Feeling Zara Zara"	Solo
2023	Jhimma 2	Marathi	"Marathi Pori"	Adarsh Shinde, Mugdha Karhade, Amitraj
2023	Jhimma 2	Marathi	"Punha Jhimma"	Apeksha Dandekar, Amitraj
2023	Phulrani	Marathi	"Hirawe Hirawe"	Solo
2023	Urmi	Marathi	"Priya Rup Tuze He Ase"	Swapnil Bandodkar
2023	Urmi	Marathi	"You're Crazy Boy"	Solo
2023	Aadharwad	Marathi	"Najres Hya Prashna Pade"	Solo
2023	Aflatoon	Marathi	"Maka Naka"	Avadhoot Gupte
2023	Dil Dosti Deewangi	Marathi	"Ashi Lajri Gojiri"	Solo
2023	Boyz 4	Marathi	"Ye Na Rani"	Avadhoot Gupte
2023	Ekda Yeun Tar Bagha	Marathi	"Aiyo"	Rahul Vaidya
2023	London Misal	Marathi	"London Misal"	Bharat Jadhav
2024	Nach Ga Ghuma	Marathi	"Nach Ga Ghuma"	Avadhoot Gupte
2024	Raghu 350	Marathi	"Mi Ga Tujhyat"	Solo
2024	Baabu	Marathi	"Majha Sappan"	Solo
2024	Satyashodhak	Marathi	"Lagin Ghatika"	Solo
2024	Shivrayancha Chhava	Marathi	"Vara Ga Mandi Vara"	Srujan Kulkarni
2024	Lek Asavi Tar Ashi	Marathi	"Saang Pori Saang"	Solo
2024	Lek Asavi Tar Ashi	Marathi	"I Love You"	Avadhoot Gupte
2024	Lek Asavi Tar Ashi	Marathi	"Lek Asavi Tar Ashi"	Suresh Wadkar
2024	Mushak Aakhyan	Marathi	"Nusta Naav Kay Pusta Daji"	Solo
2024	Like Aani Subscribe	Marathi	"Limbu Firawla"	Ravindra Khomane
2024	Maidaan	Hindi	"Ranga Ranga"	MC Heam
2025	Chhaava	Hindi	"Aaya Re Toofan"	A. R. Rahman
2025	Thug Life	Tamil	"Jinguchaa"	Shakthisree Gopalan, Adhitya R. K.
2025	Thug Life	Telugu	"Jinguchaa"	Mangli, Sri Krishna, Aashima Mahajan
2025	Thug Life	Hindi	"Jinguchaa"	Sukhwinder Singh, Ronkini Gupta, Aashima Mahajan
2026	Aga Aga Sunbai! Kay Mhantay Sasubai?	Marathi	"Aga Aga Sunbai Kay Mhanata Sasubai"	Kunal Karan; Devdutta Baji; Suraj Dhiraj
2026	Phula	Marathi	"Kanha Tujhya Basrichi"	Solo
2026	Out Of Syllabus	Marathi	"Dham Dham Dhol"	Solo
2026	Lagna Aani Barach Kahi	Marathi	"Mala Lagnachi Jhaliya Ghai"	Solo
2026	Lagna Aani Barach Kahi	Marathi	"Sakharpuda"	Suresh Wadkar, Avdhoot Gupte, Swapnil Bandodkar, Maithili Joshi, Avani Tushar Nannajkar
2026	Lagna Aani Barach Kahi	Marathi	"Sobat Fifty Fifty"	Swapnil Bandodkar
2026	Maitreyaa	Marathi	"Nighali Radha Soduni Gokula"	Adarsh Shinde

=== Non-film songs ===
Year	Album	Song	Composer	Language	Co-singer
2002	Sajana Hain Mujhe	"Sajana Hain Mujhe"	Ravindra Jain	Hindi	Solo
2002	Aika Dajiba	"Aika Dajiba"	Avadhoot Gupte	Marathi	Solo
2003	Aika Dajiba	"Aika Dajiba 2"	Avadhoot Gupte	Marathi	Avadhoot Gupte
2004	Mazhi Gaani	"Kusumita"	Avadhoot Gupte	Marathi	Solo
2005	Meri Madhubala	"Undirmama Aailo"	Avadhoot Gupte	Konkani	Avadhoot Gupte
2006	Aika Dajiba	"Mera Dadla	Herself	Hindi	Solo
2006	Aika Dajiba	"Ghotala Ghotala"	Herself	Marathi	Solo
2007	Kalat Nakalat	"Kalat Nakalat"	Nilesh Moharir	Marathi	Solo
2010	Mazhi Gaani	"Konkanchi Chedwa"	Avadhoot Gupte	Marathi	Solo
2010	Kunku	"Majha Kunku"	Nilesh Moharir	Marathi	Solo
2011	Ekach Hya Janmi Janu	"Ekach Hya Janmi Janu"	Nilesh Moharir	Marathi	Solo
2012	Eka Lagnachi Dusri Goshta	"Tujhya Vina"	Nilesh Moharir	Marathi	Mangesh Borgaonkar
2015	Are Vedya Mana	"Are Vedya Mana"	Nilesh Moharir	Marathi	Hrishikesh Ranade
2015	Durchya Ranat	"Durchya Ranat"	Harsshit Abhiraj	Marathi	Solo
2015	Tujhya Paayi Thevi Matha	"Bappa Morya Re"	Nilesh Moharir	Marathi	Avadhoot Gupte, Swapnil Bandodkar
2016	Mazhi Gaani	"Mast Challay Amcha"	Herself	Marathi	Solo
2016	Paus	"Angani Majhya"	Avadhoot Gupte	Marathi	Solo
2018	Prem Geet	"Sur Jhankarle"	Pravin Kunwar	Marathi	Solo
2019	Jeevlaga	"Jeevlaga"	Nilesh Moharir	Marathi	Swapnil Bandodkar, Hrishikesh Ranade, Aarya Ambekar
2020	Vesaavchi Paaru	"Vesaavchi Paaru"	Prashant Nakti	Marathi	Solo
2021	Hudhudi	"Hudhudi"	Nilesh Moharir	Marathi	Solo
2021	Vaatevari Mogara	"Vaatevari Mogara"	Nilesh Moharir	Marathi	Swapnil Bandodkar
2022	Tujhya Paayi Thevi Matha	"Ganpatiche Naav Adhi"	Nilesh Moharir	Marathi	Avadhoot Gupte, Swapnil Bandodkar
2022	Nakhwa	"Nakhwa Re Nakhwa"	Avadhoot Gupte	Marathi	Solo
2022	Sang Na	"Sang Na"	Ashwin Bhandare	Marathi	Solo
2022	Kanyakumari	"Kanyakumari"	Chinar-Mahesh	Marathi	Solo
2024	Nana Chhand	"Hirava Halva Paus Aala"	Nilesh Moharir	Marathi	Solo
2024	Bhoomi 2024	"Morya"	Karan Kanchan	Hindi	Saurabh Abhyankar
2024	Stree 2	"Aajchi Ratra"	Sachin–Jigar	Hindi	Divya Kumar

== Awards ==
Feature films

  - 2025 - Filmfare Award for Best Female Playback Singer – Marathi for song naach ga ghuma from film Nach Ga Ghuma.
- Zee Chitra Gaurav Puraskar nominations
  - 2005 – Pachhadlela for the song "Bhutana Zapatla"
  - 2006 – Jatra: Hyalagaad Re Tyalagaad for the song "Kombadi Palali"
  - 2007 – Golmaal for the song "Hi Gulabi Hawa"
  - 2008 - Tula Shikwin Changlach Dhada for the song "Rani Majhya Malyamandi"
  - 2019 - Ye Re Ye Re Paisa for the song "Khandala Ghat"
  - 2024 - Jhimma 2 for the song "Punha Jhimma"
- Fakt Marathi Cine Sanman nominations
  - 2022 – Jhimma for the song "Jhimma"
- Maharashtra Times Sanman nominations
  - 2006 - Golmaal for the song "Hi Gulabi Hawa" - won
