= Teen Bayka Fajiti Aika =

- Theatrical release poster
- Directed by: Raju Parsekar
- Produced by: Shankar Mitkari
- Starring: Makarand Anaspure; Nisha Parulekar; Surekha Kudachi; Kranti Redkar
- Edited by: Manoj Mishra
- Music by: Vaishali Samant; Anand Shinde; Tyagraj Khadilkar
- Production company: Shree Shankar Films
- Release date: 23 March 2012
- Running time: 128 minutes
- Country: India
- Language: Marathi

Teen Bayka Fajiti Aika is a 2012 Indian Marathi-language comedy film directed by Raju Parsekar and produced by Shankar Mitkari. It starring Makarand Anaspure, Nisha Parulekar, Kranti Redkar, Tejashree Khele, Surekha Kudachi and Vijay Chavan in lead roles. The story revolves around a husband troubled by three wives.

== Plot ==
Vishwasrao Dhoke, a married man for five years, so far without a single Descendant; His mother taunts him every time he wants to have a son. One day, the family attends a wedding where the bride is left for dowry, for which the mother suggests her son marry the bride. After second wife Pari enters Vishwasrao's life and claims to be his third wife.

== Cast ==
- Makarand Anaspure as Vishwasrao Dhoke
- Surekha Kudchi as Vishwasrao's Mother
- Nisha Parulekar as Prajakta
- Kranti Redkar as Madhvi
- Tejashree Khele as Pari
- Vijay Chavan as Vishwasrao's Father
- Mansi Naik Special appearance in "Baghtoy Rikshawala" song
- Shrishti Marathe

== Soundtrack ==
Teen Bayka Fajiti Aika

Soundtrack album by Pravin Kunwar
- Released: 2012
- Genre: Feature film soundtrack
- Length: 18:08
- Language: Marathi
- Label: Video Palace

Singles from Teen Bayka Fajiti Aika
- 1. "Wat Mazi Baghtoy Rikshawala"

Track listing
No.	Title	Lyrics	Singer(s)	Length
1.	"Ek Chumma De Na Gade"	Eknath Mali	Anand Shinde; Vaishali Samant	3:07
2.	"Nustya Navala Teen Teen Bayaka"	Eknath Mali	Tyagraj Khadilkar	2:42
3.	"Majhya Ladachya Teen Teen Bayaka"	Eknath Mali	Tyagraj Khadilkar	2:08
4.	"Nustya Navala Kelya Mi Bayka"	Eknath Mali	Tyagraj Khadilkar	2:42
5.	"Ishkachi Batli"	Eknath Mali	Vaishali Samant	3:24
6.	"Wat Mazi Baghtoy Rikshawala"	Reshma Sonwane	Anand Shinde; Reshma Sonwane	4:45
Total length:				18:08
