= Isay (disambiguation) =

Isay is an uninhabited island in the Inner Hebrides of the west coast of Scotland.

Isay may also refer to:

- Isay (surname)
- Isay, the Russian-language version of the given name Isaiah
  - Isay Davydov (1927–2020), Russian writer and journalist
  - Isay Khurgin (1924–1925), Soviet politician and diplomat, the first directpr of Amtorg
  - Isay Izrailevich Prezent, better known as Isaak Prezent (1902–1969), Soviet philosopher of biology

== See also ==
- Isay reaction, or Gabriel-Isay condensation, in organic chemistry
- Isai (disambiguation)
