= Isai (disambiguation) =

Isai is an Indian film.

Isai may also refer to:

== Given name ==
- Isai Rodriguez (born 1998), American runner
- Isai Scheinberg, Canadian businessman
- Isai Thorne (born 2004), West Indies cricketer

== Other ==
- Isai, Ukraine, village
- Isai (album), 2005 studio album by Indian band S5
- Isai (soundtrack) of the film

== See also ==
- Isay (disambiguation)
- Isaia
