= Atul Kale =

Indian actor, singer, musician and directot

Atul Kale is an Indian actor, singer, musician and director. He directed Matichya Chuli, De Dhakka and Shahanpan Dega Deva. He has won MATA Sanman and Zee Gaurav awards for his work. He is best known for Me Shivajiraje Bhosale Boltoy.

== Early life ==
Kale was born in Girgaon, Mumbai. During his college days he was drawn towards experimental theater. He acted in several Marathi and English plays like Katha Mastaramachi, Farsh- Babulchya Premacha, Anamay and Planchet. He won several awards for his portrayal with Devendra Pem.

Upon the death of his father, he took up his father's position at The Oriental Insurance Company. An associate at Oriental offered for him to sing professionally, where he shared the stage with Mahendra Kapoor and Johnny Lever. During this time, Atul was offered an English version of a commercial play called All the Best, directed by his friend Devendra Pem. He later received a call from Mahesh Manjrekar, which led to an acting career.

== Acting ==
Atul Kale worked in commercial plays including All the Best with Mahesh Manjrekar and Devendra Pem, Oh No Not Again, Monkey Business, Carry On Heaven and Funny Thing Called Love with Bharat Dabholkar.

He has appeared in international commercials including for Visa card with Richard Gere, HSBC Bank and Ashoka Foods. He has also acted in the Hindi and Marathi TV serials Ghar Jamai, Mrs. Mathur, Main (with Shekhar Suman), Vedh, Sherlock Bond, Sincenati Babla Boo and CID

With Mahesh Manjrekar, Kale had lead roles in the films Vaastav, Ehsaas, Hathyar, Pitaah, Virrudh, Tera Mera Saath Rahen, Lalu Prasad Yadav, Life Ho toh Aisi and Pran Jaye Par Shaan Na Jaye. He also acted inSam Bahadur (2023) in special appearance. He also acted in unconventional films like Nidan (story on AIDS) and Struggler. While acting, Atul also got an opportunity to assist Mahesh on films like Life Ho Toh Aisi, Struggler, Viruddh, Dear Zindagi and Rakt.

Kale portrayed the character of Yashwantrao Chavan in Maharashtra Shahir (2023).

== Music ==
He has sung in Marathi and Hindi films including Vaastav, Jis Desh Mein Ganga Rehta Hai, Tera Mera Saath Rahe, Pyar Kiya Nahi Jata Hai and Astitva. He won the Maharashtra Times Sanman Award for his heart wrenching number in Astitva. Atul has also sung in an English film directed by Bharat Dabholkar. He has composed music for films like Matichya Chuli, De Dhakka and Mi Shivaji Raje Bhonsle Boltoy.

== Direction ==
When the Marathi film industry was running through troubled times, Atul Kale co-directed with Sudesh Manjrekar the Marathi film De Dhakka. He later collaborated with Manjrekar on the film Mathichya Chuli, followed by Shahanpan Dega Deva. Kale released his first independent film Teecha Baap Tyacha Baap with DAR Motion Pictures, followed by 'Asa Mee Ashi Tee', 'Balkadu' & 'Sandook'.
