= Kho-Kho (2013 film) =

2013 Marathi-language film

- Theatrical release poster
- Directed by: Kedar Shinde
- Written by: Kedar Shinde; Omkar mangesh datt Siddharth salvi
- Produced by: Shobhna Desai
- Starring: Bharat Jadhav; Kranti Redkar; Prajakta Mali; Siddhartha Jadhav
- Cinematography: Suresh Deshmane
- Edited by: Manish Mistry
- Music by: Shashank Powar
- Production company: Shobhana Desai Productions
- Release date: 31 May 2013
- Country: India
- Language: Marathi

Kho-Kho is an Indian Marathi language film directed by Kedar Shinde and produced by Shobhna Desai. The film starring Bharat Jadhav, Kranti Redkar, Prajakta Mali and Siddhartha Jadhav. Music by Shashank Powar. The film was theatrically released on 31 May 2013.

== Synopsis ==
A school teacher goes back to his village to settle in his ancestral house, but a builder troubles him to sell it so that a mall can be built. The teacher is then haunted by the spirits of his ancestors that are waiting to be liberated.

== Cast ==
- Bharat Jadhav as Shrirang Deshmukh
- Kranti Redkar as Koynabai Deshmukh
- Prajakta Mali as Suman
- Siddhartha Jadhav
- Kamlakar Satpute as Pakya
- Vijay Chavan as Ghatpade
- Uday Tikekar as builder Mehta

== Soundtrack ==
Kho-Kho

Soundtrack album by Shashank Powar
- Released: 2013
- Recorded: 2013
- Genre: Feature film soundtrack
- Length: 19:34
- Language: Marathi

Track listing
No.	Title	Singer(s)	Length
1.	"Hey Ranga"	Adarsh Shinde, Neha Rajpal	5:49
2.	"Udo Udo"	Adarsh Shinde	3:34
3.	"Halkech Nazar"	Neha Rajpal	3:23
4.	"Kadhi Hanste"	Arati Ankalikar-Tikekar	3:41
5.	"Life Is Kho"	Usha Uthup	3:47
Total length:			19:34

== Critical response ==
Kho-Kho received mixed reviews from critics. A reviewer of The Times of India gave the film 3 stars out of 5 and wrote "With so much going for this film, there are some twists and turns in the second half and a Marathi asmita awakening dialogues, which though are justified and in parts fun too, they remind you of the film Mee Shivaji Raje Boltoy". Jaydeep Pathak of Maharashtra Times gave the film 3.5 stars out of 5 and wrote "The mansion created using high production values, the polygonal lighting scheme used to underline the mystique of the mansion and the special effects all make Srirang's entanglement with his ancestors handsome on screen. Sudhakar Manjrekar's art direction has to be specially appreciated". A reviewer of Loksatta wrote "The use of graphics, the film based on the plot of the drama, strong actors like Bharat, Siddharth, Kranti, all of them are not very good. This play, staged in the frame of the stage, is clearly messed up from the camera's point of view".
