= Maitreyaa =

Upcoming Marathi film directed by Kranti Redkar

- Directed by: Kranti Redkar
- Written by: Kranti Redkar
- Produced by: Manoj Khalatkar; Aman Khalatkar
- Starring: Samar Khalatkar; Sky; Aayushi Bhave; Ruchi Jail
- Cinematography: Devendra Golatkar
- Edited by: Ashish Mhatre
- Music by: Pankajj Padghan
- Production company: Samar Times Production
- Distributed by: AA Films
- Release date: 20 November 2026
- Running time: 161 minutes
- Country: India
- Language: Marathi

Maitreyaa is a 2026 Indian Marathi-language romantic drama film written and directed by Kranti Redkar and produced by Manoj Khalatkar under the banner of Samar Times Productions. The film stars Samar Khalatkar, Sky, Aayushi Bhave, and Ruchi Jail in their respective leading-role debuts. It follows two childhood best friends whose bond is tested when new relationships enter their lives, exploring the evolving dynamics between friendship, love, and unspoken feelings.

== Cast ==
- Samar Khalatkar as Nirwan
- Sky as Jay
- Aayushi Bhave as Arjoyee
- Ruchi Jail as Saajiri
- Rutwij Kulkarni
- Vipul Khandale
- Rashmi Shetye
- Jaywant Wadkar
- Supriya Pathare
- Kamlakar Satpute
- Mrunal Deshpande
- Reva Kharade
- Umesh Thakur
- Siddhi Vinayak Kamath
- Sandhya Sawant
- Shital Kalhapure
- Jyoti Apte
- Amit Jambhekar
- Prem
- Bhakti Kadam
- Kranti Redkar as herself in a special appearance in the song "Tujhe Naav Gheta"
- Urmila Kanetkar as herself in a special appearance in the song "Tujhe Naav Gheta"

== Production ==
Maitreyaa marks actress Kranti Redkar's second film as a director, following Kaakan (2015).

== Soundtrack ==
The music is composed by Pankajj Padghan. For the title track, the rap was written and sung by Redkar for the first time.

Track listing
| No. | Title | Lyrics | Singer(s) | Length |
|---|---|---|---|---|
| 1. | "Maitreyaa Title Track" | Omkar Mangesh Datt | Siddhant Bhosle, Kranti Redkar | 3:27 |
| 2. | "Tujhe Naav Gheta" | Guru Thakur | Shivam Singh, Apurva Nisshad | 3:24 |
| 3. | "Nighali Radha Soduni Gokula" | Omkar Mangesh Datt | Adarsh Shinde, Vaishali Samant | 3:18 |
| Total length: | | | | 10:09 |

== Release ==
The film was officially announced on 2 August 2026, coinciding with Friendship Day. The teaser was released on 21 September 2026 and featured the tagline, “एकीकडे प्रेम, एकीकडे मैत्री अन् एकीकडे मैत्रीत गोंधळलेलं प्रेम…” The film was initially scheduled for release on 23 October 2026 but was later postponed by a month and was released on 20 November 2026.
