= Jhunj Marathmoli =

Indian reality and stunt television series

- Native name: Ladha Swabhimanacha, Majhya Marathi Asmitecha
- Starring: See Below
- Presented by: Shreyas Talpade
- No. of contestants: 16
- Winner: Vikram Gaikwad
- Runner-up: Pushkar Jog
- No. of episodes: 25

Release
- Original network: ETV Marathi
- Original release: 26 May – 17 August 2014

Jhunj Marathmoli (transl. Battle of Marathi culture) is an Indian reality and stunt television series which aired on ETV Marathi. It was anchored by Shreyas Talpade. The celebrity contestants travel to 12 different cities across Maharashtra and participate in challenging tasks that put to test courage, willpower and determination. It premiered from 26 May 2014 and ended on 17 August 2014.

== Status ==
Contestant	Occupation	Status	Place	Exit episode
Vikram Gaikwad	Actor	Winner	1st	Episode 25
Pushkar Jog	Actor	1st Runner-up	2nd	Episode 25
Manisha Kelkar	Actress	2nd Runner-up	3rd	Episode 25
Pandharinath Kamble	Comedian	Finalist	4th	Episode 25
Parag Kanhere	Chef	Finalist	5th	Episode 25
Aarti Solanki	Comedian	Eliminated	6th	Episode 24
Ruchi Savarn	Actress	Eliminated	7th	Episode 22
Neha Shitole	Actress	Eliminated	8th	Episode 20
Deepti Devi	Actress	Eliminated	9th	Episode 19
Tyagraj Khadilkar	Singer	Eliminated	10th	Episode 18
Vidya Sagar	Choreographer	Eliminated	11th	Episode 15
Swapnil Rajshekhar	Actor	Eliminated	12th	Episode 12
Hemlata Bane	Actress	Eliminated	13th	Episode 10
Abhijit Thakur	Choreographer	Eliminated	14th	Episode 8
Megha Sampat	Choreographer	Eliminated	15th	Episode 6
Megha Dhade	Actress	Eliminated	16th	Episode 4

== Contestants ==
=== Main entrants ===
- Pandharinath Kamble - Comedian. Known for participating in Comedy Express and Fu Bai Fu.
- Aarti Solanki - Comedian. Known for participating in Fu Bai Fu.
- Megha Sampat - Choreographer.
- Swapnil Rajshekhar - Actor. Known for playing negative roles in television shows and films.
- Parag Kanhere - Chef.
- Megha Dhade - Film actress. Known for playing the character in films such as Maan Sanmaan, Superstar.
- Vikram Gaikwad - Actor and Makeup artist. Known for playing Mahadev Govind Ranade in Unch Majha Zoka.
- Hemlata Bane - Actress. Known for appearance in Mala Retiwala Navra Pahije song.
- Satish Dede - Choreographer. Also known as Vidya Sagar. He is upcoming choreographer of the industry.
- Deepti Devi - Actress. Known for playing role in the Mala Sasu Havi.
- Ruchi Savarn - Actress. Known for playing lead roles in Hindi television shows.
- Tyagraj Khadilkar - Singer.
- Manisha Kelkar - Film actress.
- Abhijit Thakur - Choreographer.

=== Wild card entrants ===
- Neha Shitole - Actress. Known for playing comedy and negative roles in film and television shows.
- Pushkar Jog - Actor and dancer. Known for playing lead roles in Marathi films.
