= Lagna Aani Barach Kahi =

2026 Marathi-language romantic comedy film

- Directed by: Vedanti Dani
- Written by: Vedanti Dani; Dialogue; Sharvari Pethkar
- Story by: Yashashri Masurkar
- Produced by: Anjali Tushar Nannajkar; Sanjana Suresh Pai
- Starring: Pooja Sawant; Abhijeet Khandkekar
- Cinematography: Smita Nirmal
- Edited by: Bhakti Mayaloo
- Music by: Vaishali Samant
- Production companies: Naad Studios; Avyaan Arts; Mhalsa Entertainment
- Distributed by: Pickle Entertainment
- Release date: 23 October 2026
- Running time: 113 minutes
- Country: India
- Language: Marathi

Lagna Aani Barach Kahi (transl. Marriage and Much More) is a 2026 Indian Marathi-language romantic comedy drama film directed by Vedanti Dani from a story by Yashashri Masurkar. Presented by Naad Studios and produced by Avyaan Arts and Mhalsa Entertainment, the film stars Pooja Sawant and Abhijeet Khandkekar in the lead roles. The film follows a modern, independent woman who meets her partner through an online dating platform and struggles to adjust to the expectations placed on her after marriage.

The music of the film was composed by Vaishali Samant. Lagna Aani Barach Kahi was theatrically released on 23 October 2026.

== Plot ==
Pallavi, a young, independent woman living in a world where women have moved beyond traditional roles, finds a partner in Aniruddha Patil, a man from Kolhapur, after the two connect online. As their romance leads to marriage, Pallavi finds it difficult to conform to the fixed rules of married life, and the couple must work out whether they can build a marriage on their own terms while navigating the roles that society and family expect of them.

== Cast ==
- Pooja Sawant as Pallavi
- Abhijeet Khandkekar as Aniruddha Patil
- Sukanya Gurav as Anita
- Akshaya Naik
- Himanshu Raj Talreja
- Bharati Patil
- Anuj Nayak

== Production ==
The film marked actress Yashashri Masurkar's writing debut and was conceived as a contemporary Marathi romantic story written and directed by women from a woman's perspective, with women leading every department of the production. Abhijeet Khandkekar described his character, as a responsible man whose portrayal challenges conventional notions of masculinity. The filmmakers also discussed their approach to addressing a serious subject through the romantic comedy genre. The film marked the Marathi film debut of television actress Akshaya Naik.

== Marketing ==
The film's official poster was unveiled on 19 August 2026 at Mantralaya, Mumbai, by Deputy Chief Minister Sunetra Pawar and Women and Child Development Minister Aditi Tatkare. In October 2026, the theatrical trailer and two songs, "Mala Lagnachi Zaliya Ghai" and "Sakharpuda", were released on Aditya Nair Productions YouTube Channel at an event attended by singer and composer Vaishali Samant.

== Soundtrack ==
Lagna Aani Barach Kahi

Soundtrack album by Vaishali Samant
- Released: 2026
- Genre: Feature film soundtrack
- Length: 10:36
- Label: Aditya Nair Productions

The film's music was composed by Vaishali Samant, while Jay Mehta composed the background score.

Track listing
No.	Title	Lyrics	Singer(s)	Length
1.	"Mala Lagnachi Jhaliya Ghai"	Vaishali Samant	Vaishali Samant	3:10
2.	"Sakharpuda"	Prajakta Mandke	Suresh Wadkar, Avdhoot Gupte, Swapnil Bandodkar, Vaishali Samant, Maithili Joshi, Avani Tushar Nannajkar	3:36
3.	"Sobat Fifty Fifty"	Vaishali Samant, Sharmila Ranade	Vaishali Samant, Swapnil Bandodkar	3:50
Total length:				10:36

== Release ==
Lagna Aani Barach Kahi was released theatrically on 23 October 2026, distributed by Pickle Entertainment. It was one of six Marathi films released on the same day, alongside Kapuskonda, Dashami, Magazine, Mrutyuchakra and Sarpanch – The Power Man.

== Reception ==
Komal Nahta of Film Information gave the film a negative review, describing the story as routine and the screenplay as predictable, and found that its progressive themes felt dated. He praised Pooja Sawant's performance and called Abhijeet Khandkekar very good, but rated the direction as mediocre and concluded that the film was neither entertaining nor novel enough to draw audiences. He also described the film's publicity and opening as dull.
