= Avinash–Vishwajeet =

Avinash-Vishwajeet
- Also known as: Avinash-Vishwajeet
- Born: Avinash Chandrachood and Vishwajeet Joshi
- Occupation: Film composer
- Years active: 2007–present

Avinash–Vishwajeet are a Marathi film composer duo consisting of Avinash Chandrachood and Vishwajeet Joshi. They have written the scores for films such as Sanngto Aika…!, Popat, Premachi Goshta, Badam Rani Gulam Chor, Mumbai-Pune-Mumbai. Avinash–Vishwajeet is their professional name and appears on the covers of their music CDs and DVDs. Apart from music direction, Vishwajeet Joshi is also a lyricist.

== Early life ==
Avinash Chandrachud and Vishwajeet Joshi began their careers independently in the music industry. They first met while working on the same album, unaware of each other's contributions. When the album was completed, they realized their musical styles and creative visions were remarkably aligned. This realization led to their decision to collaborate as a duo, officially forming Avinash-Vishwajeet. Their shared vision and mutual respect for each other's creativity have been the foundation of their long-standing partnership.

== Musical career ==
They began their career in 2007, composing music for many Marathi movies. The duo has composed music for numerous Marathi films and television shows. They have also created original scores and jingles, working across multiple languages and genres.

Avinash-Vishwajeet’s international breakthrough came during the COVID-19 lockdown. Their journey into Hollywood began when a relative from Paris approached them to create an instrumental rhythm track. This collaboration gained attention in France, leading to an opportunity to compose a Punjabi wedding song for Murder Mystery 2.

"The Great Indian Wedding" was crafted to suit a narrative involving an Indian Maharaja’s wedding, incorporating traditional Punjabi beats while aligning with the film's storyline. The song was launched at the Eiffel Tower in Paris and received global acclaim.

== Discography ==
=== Film songs ===
Year	Film	Director	Notes
2007	Tula Shikavin Changalach Dhada	Girish Mohite	Background score
2008	Oxygen: Jeev Gudmartoy	Rajiv Patil	Background score
2008	Ek Daav Dhobi Pachhad	Satish Rajwade	Background score
2008	Aaichcha Gondhal	Sangita Pusalkar	Background score & Music Director
2008	Sanai Choughade	Rajiv Patil	Background score
2009	Male Barali Manju Irali	Vijayalakshmi Singh	Background score
2009	Gaiir	Satish Rajwade	Background Music & Music Director
2010	Mumbai-Pune-Mumbai	Satish Rajwade	Music Director
2010	Vaare Vah	Vijayalakshmi Singh	Music Director
2011	Pratibimb	Girish Mohite	Background Music
2012	Bluffmaster	Kishor Sav	Background Music
2012	Lau Ka Laath	Vijay Patkar	Background Music & Music Director
2012	Daaghedore	Akshay Yashwant Datt	Background Music & Music Director
2012	Bharatiya	Girish Mohite	Background Music
2012	Badam Rani Gulam Chor	Satish Rajwade	Music Director
2012	Sambha - Aajcha Chhavaa	Sanjay Todkar	Music Director
2013	Premachi Goshta	Satish Rajwade	Background Music & Music Director
2013	Dhating Dhingana	Mandar Devsthali	Background Music
2013	Popat	Satish Rajwade	Music Director
2014	Sanngto Aika	Satish Rajwade	Music Director
2014	Aandhali Koshimbir	Aditya Ingle	Background Music & Music Director
2014	Cappuccino	Shiv Kadam	Music Director
2014	Guru Pournima	Girish Mohite	Music Director
2014	Classmates	Aditya Sarpotdar	Music Director (Shared)
2014	Ishq Wala Love	Renu Desai	Music Director (Shared)
2015	Mumbai-Pune-Mumbai 2	Satish Rajwade	Music Director
2015	Bioscope	Girish Mohite	Music Director
2015	7, Roshan Villa	Akshay Mahadik	Music Director
2016	Vazandar	Sachin Kundalkar	Music Director
2017	Ti Saddhya Kay Karte	Satish Rajwade	Music Director (Shared)
2017	Conditions Apply - Ati Lagu	Girish Mohite	Music Director
2017	Gachchi	Nachiket Samant	Music Director (1 song)
2018	Mantr	Devendra Shinde	Music Director
2018	Mumbai Pune Mumbai 3	Satish Rajwade	Music Director (shared)
2019	Readymix	Jalindar Kumbhar	Music Director
2019	Triple Seat	Sanket Pavse	Music Director
2021	Kaali Maati	Hemantkumar Mahale	Music Director
2022	Dharmaveer	Pravin Tarde	Music Director (Shared)
2022	Sarsenapati Hambirrao	Pravin Tarde	Music Director
2022	Luckdown Be Positive	Santosh Manjrekar	Music Director
2023	Murder Mystery 2	Jeremy Garelick	Music Director (1 song)
2024	Aaichya Gavat Marathi Bol	Omi Vaidya	Music Director
2024	Dharmaveer 2	Pravin Tarde	Music Director (Shared)
2024	Phullwanti	Snehal Tarde	Music Director
2025	Gulkand	Sachin Goswami	Music Director
2025	Premachi Goshta 2	Satish Rajwade	Music Director
2025	Tath Kana	Girish Mohite	Music Director
2026	Aadi Anant	Mahesh Limaye	Music Director

=== Television songs ===
Year	Title	Channel	Notes
2016	Majhya Navaryachi Bayko	Zee Marathi	Music Director
2022	Tuzech Mi Geet Gaat Aahe	Star Pravah	Music Director
2025	Mauli Maharashtrachi	Star Pravah	Music Director
2025	Lapandav	Star Pravah	Music Director

== Awards ==
Year	Award	Category	Film	Result
2013	Mirchi Music Awards Marathi	Album of the Year	Premachi Goshta	Nominated
2018	Mirchi Music Awards Marathi	Album of the Year	Ti Saddhya Kay Karte	Won
2018	Zee Chitra Gaurav Puraskar	Best Music Director	Ti Saddhya Kay Karte	Nominated
2018	4th Filmfare Awards Marathi	Best Music Director	Ti Saddhya Kay Karte	Won
2018	Maharashtracha Favourite Kon?	Favourite Song of the Year	Ti Saddhya Kay Karte (Hrudayat Vaje Something)	Won
2021	Five Continents International Film Festival	Best Original Score Feature Film	Kaali Maati	Won
2021	South Films and Arts Academy Festival	Best Original Score	Kaali Maati	Won
2021	Screen Power Film Festival	Best Music	Kaali Maati	Won
