= Fakta Ladh Mhana =

- Theatrical release poster
- Directed by: Sanjay Jadhav
- Written by: Sanjay Jadhav
- Produced by: Great Maratha Entertainment Company; Twinkle Group & Mirah Entertainment
- Starring: Bharat Jadhav; Sachin Khedekar; Siddharth Jadhav; Sanjay Narvekar
- Cinematography: Sanjay Jadhav
- Edited by: Rahul Bhatnakar
- Music by: Ajit - Sameer
- Release date: 5 August 2011
- Country: India
- Language: Marathi
- Budget: ₹4 crores
- Box office: ₹12 crores

Fakta Ladh Mhana (transl. Just say fight) is a 2011 Indian Marathi-language multi-starrer action-thriller film directed by Sanjay Jadhav. It is produced and written by Mahesh Manjrekar. The film is led by Aniket Vishwasrao, Siddharth Jadhav, Sanjay Narvekar, Santosh Juvekar, Bharat Jadhav, Mahesh Manjrekar, Sachin Khedekar and Vaibhav Mangle. It is notable for being one of the costliest Marathi films.

== Plot ==
The story revolves around a gang that consists of Tukaram, Westindies (a dark guy), Kanphatya (who has hearing problems), Salim, Alex (an aggressive guy), Paanikam (a small boy) and Baba Bhai (leader of the gang). The story of the film is about the suicides of farmers.

They threaten Kulkarni and take him into police custody. But owing to Madhusudhan Patil's power, Kulkarni is saved, and the five boys are arrested. They are ordered by Bababhai to come back to Mumbai. While going to Mumbai, they discover that Bhaskarrao had killed Paanikam. Alex is very angry, and they decide to stay back and avenge his death. They threaten Madhusudhan Patil, Bhaskarrao and Kulkarni that they will kill them in 13 days. They hide at Madhusudhan Patil's farmhouse. They capture Kulkarni and get the evidence of Madhusudhan Patil's illegal work. They also kill Lokesh Dharne, a journalist who was responsible for the death of Milind Master. Madhusudhan Patil calls his goons to kill the five boys. One-night Madhusudhan Patil realizes that the five boys are hiding in his farmhouse. They fight with them there and in the fight Salim and Kanfatya die. Afterwards West Indies, Tukaram and Alex kill Bhaskarrao. Somehow Madhusudhan Patil manages to kill them with the help of Bababhai but as he cremates them, they come out of their pyres and attack Madhusudhan Patil and his men. In the end Madhusudhan Patil is burnt to death by the boys and Bababhai and they proudly walk away.

== Cast ==
- Sachin Khedekar as Madhusudan Patil
- Bharat Jadhav as Tukaram
  - Jitendra Joshi as voiceover of Tukaram
- Sanjay Narvekar as Kanfatya
- Siddharth Jadhav as West Indies
- Vaibhav Mangle as Sawkar Kulkarni
- Aniket Vishwasrao as Alex
- Mahesh Manjrekar as Bababhai
- Kranti Redkar as Shalini (Tukaram's love interest)
- Santosh Juvekar as Salim
- Saksham Kulkarni as Vithoba
- Sanjay Khapre as Bhaskarrao Patil
- Dhananjay Mandrekar as Chief Minister
- Medha Manjrekar as Madhusudan's wife
- Vishakha Subhedar as Brothel Madam
- Umesh Tonpe as Sam
- Satish Pulekar as Gangadhar
- Bharat Ganeshpure
- Amruta Khanvilkar as Special Appearance in song
- Manasi Naik as Special Appearance in song

== Production and promotion ==
The film's promotion caught audiences as it aroused curiosity through poster. The poster only showed five men holding another person at gunpoint. The actors were not seen in this poster. The film also caught many eyes for being one of the most costliest Marathi film. The budget of the film went above ₹4 crore.

== Soundtrack ==
The music of Fakta Ladh Mhana is composed by the duo of Ajit-Sameer while the lyrics are penned by Guru Thakur, Kaushal Inamdar, Pravin Kunvar & Jeetendra Joshi.

No.	Title	Singer(s)	Length
1	"Fakta Ladh Mhana" Title Song	Ajit Parab, Mahesh Manjrekar, Chorus	3:52
2	"Aan De"	Avadhoot Gupte, Ajit Parab	4:21
3	"Tu Manat Tu" (Kawawali)	Neha Rajpal, Swapnil Bandodkar, Ajit Parab, Chorus	5:44
4	"Daav Ishqacha" (Laavni)	Urmila Dhangar, Chorus	5:20
