= Truckbhar Swapna =

- Directed by: Pramod Pawar
- Produced by: Nitin Chandrakant Desai
- Starring: Makarand Deshpande; Kranti Redkar; Aditi Pohankar; Mukesh Rishi; Smita Tambe
- Cinematography: Rajiv Jain
- Edited by: Prashant Khedekar
- Music by: Shreyashh Angane
- Release date: 24 August 2018
- Country: India
- Language: Marathi

Truckbhar Swapna is an Indian Marathi language film directed by Pramod Pawar and produced by Nitin Chandrakant Desai. The film starring Makarand Deshpande, Kranti Redkar, Aaditi Pohankar, Mukesh Rishi and Smita Tambe.The film was released on 24 August 2018.

== Synopsis ==
An honest taxi driver in Mumbai plans to extend his house to provide better for his family. However, he is forced to deal with corrupt officials and a lecherous contractor along the way.

== Cast ==
- Makarand Deshpande as Raja Kadam
- Kranti Redkar-Wankhede as Rani
- Smita Tambe
- Aditi Pohankar as Kajal
- Mukesh Rishi as Civil contractor RK

== Production ==
Principal photography began on 13 April 2016.

== Soundtrack ==
Truckbhar Swapna

Soundtrack album by Shreyashh
- Released: 2018
- Recorded: 2018
- Genre: Feature film soundtrack
- Length: 16:05
- Language: Marathi

Official audio
- Truckbhar Swapna – Full Album on YouTube

Track listing
No.	Title	Singer(s)	Length
1.	"Dhadak Dhadak"	Javed Ali	4:04
2.	"Luklukle Swapna"	Sonu Nigam, Anandi Joshi	4:17
3.	"Selfie Wali"	Mamta Sharma	3:23
4.	"Deva Tujha Deulat"	Adarsh Shinde	4:21
Total length:			16:05

== Critical response ==
Mukund Kule of The Times of India gave the film 2.5 stars out of 5 and wrote "In the technical aspects, the film is just alright and there is nothing that helps make it stand out. Had it been given a better treatment and a little more thought, Truckbhar Swapna could've been a good watch". Ganesh Matkari of Pune Mirror wrote "The film neatly writes the message down in case you have not understood it after watching the entire film. That’s a big help, as I am not sure you will get it otherwise". Keyur Seta of Cinestaan.com gave the film 1 stars out of 5 and wrote "While he shows some maturity in his act, you can’t help but wonder what made him choose Truckbhar Swapna as his comeback film". A Reviewer of Maharashtra Times gave the film 2.5 stars out of 5 and wrote "Makarand falls a bit short for this role. Because he looks like 'Makarand Deshpande' even in the role of a Raja. Both Kranti Redkar and Smita Tambe have done exceptionally well". Prajakta Chitnis of Lokmat gave the film 2.5 stars out of 5 and says "While watching the movie, it feels like a real slum in Mumbai. Also, the colors and costumes of the characters in the film have been put together very well".
