= U, Bomsi n Me =

U, Bomsi & Me
- Directed by: Jairaj Padmanabhan
- Produced by: Bobby Bahal
- Starring: Gautam Rode; Sonal Sehgal; Vivek Madan; Kranti Redkar; Bobby Bahl; Vidya Malvade
- Cinematography: Hari Nair
- Edited by: Rajveer Tewari
- Music by: Deepak Pandit
- Production company: Angel Movies Enterprise
- Release date: 21 October 2005
- Running time: 172 minutes
- Language: Hindi

U, Bomsi & Me is a Hindi language film released in 2005.

== Plot ==
The film is based on three married men and how they face their problems.

Raghavan, also known as Raga, is from Tamil Nadu and is a clumsy guy. He loves to watch cricket with beer and is married to Raji, who is a lecturer, hates cricket, and is obsessed with cleanliness.

Bomsi, a Parsi and an avid smoker, just wants to be rich and wants to buy a house in a big Parsi colony. He is married to Shenaaz, who is a salesgirl in a fashion magazine and wants a child, but so far the couple has been unable to conceive.

Sam Mac Patel, a half Gujarati and half Punjabi boy, is a radio jockey and wants to be a famous writer. His wife is Monica, an air hostess who is always away from him. They spend most of their time apart, leading both to be suspicious of the other person.

== Cast ==
- Gautam Rode as Sam Mac Patel
- Sonal Sehgal as Monica
- Vivek Madan as Raghavan
- Kranti Redkar as Raji
- Bobby Bahl as Bomsi
- Vidya Malvade as Shehnaz

== Reception ==
Patcy N of Rediff.com wrote, "The film is obviously a comedy, but has few true comic moments. The actors struggle through some very poor dubbing. Vivek Madan manages a South Indian accent all right, but Bobby Bahal's Parsi diction keeps slipping. Gautam Rode pulls off a couple of sequences, but none of these kids can be called good actors." Taran Adarsh of IndiaFM gave the film 1.5 out of 5, writing, "On the whole, U, BOMSI N ME is more for the elite/metro viewer than the commoner."

== Soundtrack ==
The soundtrack was composed by Deepak Pandit while lyrics were penned by Manoj Muntashir and Aseem Arora.

U Bomsi N Me

Soundtrack album by Deepak Pandit
- Released: 2005
- Genre: Feature film soundtrack
- Label: Universal Music Group
- Producer: Deepak Pandit

=== Track listing ===
No.	Title	Artist(s)	Length
1.	"Kahan Ho Tum (Album Version)"	Bombay Vikings	3:41
2.	"Josh Naal (Album Version)"	Josh (band)	4:26
3.	"Aankhon Mein"	Sonu Nigam & Shreya Ghoshal	5:12
4.	"Yeh Zindagi Hai"	Vasundhara Das	5:03
5.	"Halki Halki"	KK (singer)	4:59
6.	"Dil Kahin Kho Gaya"	Hariharan (singer)	5:22
7.	"Halki Halki"	Shreya Ghoshal	4:59
8.	"Tu Kahan Kho Gaya"	Shreya Ghoshal	5:20
9.	"Dil Kahin Kho Gaya (Instrumental)"	Deepak Pandit	5:21
Total length:			44:28
