= Shart: The Challenge =

- Directed by: Puri Jagannadh
- Written by: Puri Jagannadh
- Based on: Badri by Puri Jagannadh
- Produced by: T. Trivikrama Rao
- Starring: Tusshar Kapoor; Gracy Singh; Amrita Arora; Prakash Raj; Anupam Kher; Rajpal Yadav
- Cinematography: Madhu Ambat
- Edited by: Kotagiri Venkateswara Rao
- Music by: Anu Malik
- Production company: Vijayalakshmi Art Pictures
- Release date: 13 August 2004
- Country: India
- Language: Hindi

Shart: The Challenge is a 2004 Indian Hindi-language romantic drama film written and directed by Puri Jagannadh. This film stars Tusshar Kapoor, Gracy Singh, Amrita Arora, Prakash Raj, and Anupam Kher. It is a remake of his Telugu film, Badri.

== Plot ==
Karan has a habit of involving himself in all types of challenges. While Karan and Sonam go out singing and dancing, there comes a moment when an argument develops between them regarding love. Sonam believes in love at first sight while Karan opposes vehemently, stating that love at first sight is nothing but a mere infatuation. Sonam challenges Karan to befriend and propose to a girl of her choice. If he succeeds, she will accept defeat and present Karan with a gift, which he has to accept. Karan accepts the challenge.

Immediately after, a beautiful girl steps down the temple stairs. Sonam notices her and points at her as the target for their challenge. The girl is Saryu. Adopting different methods, Karan ultimately strikes a chord of friendship with Saryu. One day, Saryu's brother Nanda sees them together. Nanda and his goons beat people black and blue if they dare to cast an evil eye on Saryu. He goes to Karan's office with his henchmen. After a scuffle, Nanda warns Karan to stay away from his sister. Seeing their rough behavior, Sonam expresses her wish to withdraw her challenge but Karan is now more determined to face Nanda at any cost.

Saryu learns about the confrontation and decides to reveal everything to her brother. While he is in a jolly mood, she confesses her love for Karan. Nanda gets enraged and disapproves of Karan. A depressed Saryu attempts suicide. Karan learns about the suicide attempt and runs to the hospital to meet her but Nanda confronts him again. Nanda tells Saryu that Karan is in love with another girl, and they are planning to marry shortly. When Saryu questions Karan about it, he reveals the truth about the challenge with Sonam. Saryu feels betrayed. Sonam observes all this and tells Karan that he has won the challenge, for which her gift to him is Saryu's hand in marriage.

== Cast ==
- Tusshar Kapoor as Karan Kapoor
- Gracy Singh as Sonam Kapoor
- Amrita Arora as Saryu
- Prakash Raj as Nandu
- Anupam Kher as Dr. Mathur
- Shakti Kapoor as Kamlesh Kapoor, Karan's uncle
- Asrani as Khairatlal
- Vrajesh Hirjee as Sunil
- Rajpal Yadav as Bhoothnath
- Narsing Yadav as Chaurangi
- Snehal Dabi as Vinay
- Ghazar Khan as Balvinder

== Soundtrack ==
Lyricist: Sameer

#	Title	Singer(s)
1	"I Am An Indian"	Sonu Nigam
2	"Yeh Chiquita Komastaas"	Poornima, Asha Bhosle
3	"Hum Pyar Kar Baithe"	Sonu Nigam, Alka Yagnik
4	"Dil To Awara Hai"	Sonu Nigam, Shreya Ghoshal
5	"Dil Mera Badmaash"	Sonu Nigam, Poornima
6	"Dil Mein Mere Toofan Hai"	Sonu Nigam, Alka Yagnik
7	"Hansati Hai Rulati Hai"	Abhijeet
8	"Miskaas"	Abhijeet

== Reception ==
Taran Adarsh of IndiaFM gave the film 1 out of 5, writing "Director Poori Jagannath has handled a few dramatic sequences well, but he ought to know that mere remaking of a South hit is no guarantee that the audiences in the North would take to it as well. Anu Malik's music is average. Cinematography is just about okay. Tusshar Kapoor tries hard to infuse life in his character. Gracy Singh does her part convincingly. Amrita Arora has her moments. On the whole, SHART is a weak fare in all respects."
