= Kranti Redkar =

Indian actress (born 1982)

Kranti Redkar-Wankhede
- Born: 17 July 1982 (age 44); Mumbai, Maharashtra, India
- Occupations: Actress; filmmaker
- Years active: 2003–present
- Spouse: Sameer Wankhede (m. 2017)
- Children: 2

Kranti Redkar-Wankhede (née Redkar; born 17 August 1982) is an Indian film actress, director, and writer who primarily worked in Marathi films.

After making her acting debut in 2000 in Soon Asavi Ashi, she gained recognition for the "Kombadi Palali" song from the movie Jatra: Hyalagaad Re Tyalagaad (2005). She established herself with roles in the dramas Majha Navra Tujhi Bayko (2006), Sakkha Savatra (2008), Shikshanachya Aaicha Gho (2010) and On Duty 24 Taas (2010). She also worked in the American biographical film The Letters (2014). Further praise came for her performances in the romantic drama Teen Bayka Fajiti Aika (2012), No Entry: Pudhe Dhoka Aahey (2012), the comedy Kho-Kho (2013), the ensemble drama Sugar Salt Ani Prem (2015), and the comedy mystery Murder Mestri (2015).

Redkar made her directorial debut with the romantic Kaakan in 2015, for which she won the Best Director Award at the Nashik International Film Festival. She next gained acclaim for portraying fraudsters in Kiran Kulkarni vs Kiran Kulkarni (2016) and a surrogate maid in Karaar (2017). The latter received a nomination for Best Supporting Actress at the 4th Filmfare Awards Marathi. In addition to this, she launched her own clothing brand, ZiyaZyda, in 2019. Redkar is married to Zonal Director of the NCB, Sameer Wankhede, with whom she has twin daughters.

== Early life ==
Kranti Redkar was born on 17 August 1982 into a Marathi Bhandari family in Mumbai to Dinanath and Urmila Redkar. She has two sisters, Hridaya Banerjee and Sanjana Wavhal. Redkar received her primary education at Cardinal Gracias High School in Bandra and later completed her graduation from Ramnarain Ruia College.

== Career ==
=== Career beginnings and recognition (2000–2009) ===
During her college days, she began participating in college plays and also worked in a few Marathi productions. She made her film debut with Soon Asavi Ashi, opposite Ankush Chaudhari, in 2000. She then appeared in a small role as a kidnapped girl, Apurva Kumari, in Prakash Jha's 2003 critically acclaimed Gangaajal.

In 2005, she was seen in critical and commercial failure U, Bomsi n Me. Her next release was the 2006 Marathi comedy film Jatra: Hyalagaad Re Tyalagaad, directed by Kedar Shinde with an ensemble cast of Bharat Jadhav, Siddhartha Jadhav, Vijay Chavan, and Priya Berde. It was a huge success, especially since she became a household name through the superhit song "Kombadi Palali". It was the first film where Redkar and Jadhav paired opposite each other. Following the success of Jatra, she once again collaborated with Jadhav and Shinde on the romantic comedy Majha Navra Tujhi Bayko. The story is about two couples and their complicated married lives. It was commercially well performed.

Redkar starrer in two films in 2007, first the romantic drama Soon Majhi Bhagyachi and the drama Ghartyasathi Sar Kahi. This was followed by the 2008 super-hit family drama film Sakkha Savatra, a remake of the 1992 Hindi film Beta, which itself was a remake of the Tamil film Enga Chinna Rasa. The story revolving around a wicked stepmother and her innocent son, where she portrayed the smart daughter-in-law who understands and makes her husband aware of the odd goings, alongside Makarand Anaspure and Berde. Her next film was Mahesh Tilekar's comedy Gaon Tasa Changala, alongside Nilu Phule, Sanjay Narvekar, and Siddharth Jadhav. She played the glamorous role of US-return-educated teacher.

Her only release in 2009 was Mata Ekvira Navsala Pauli, directed by her father, Dinanath Redkar. She portrayed a devotee of the goddess Ekvira and showcased her unwavering faith.

=== Critical and commercial success (2010–2014) ===
Mahesh Manjrekar's Shikshanachya Aaicha Gho was her first release in 2010, which was based on our education department. The film was highly praised by critics and audiences, mainly calling it a must-watch film and was also remade in four languages: Bengali, Tamil, Telugu and Punjabi. Ulhas Shirke of Marathi Movie World found she has been cleverly used to complete the requirement of a female lead and wrote, "'she has played her part well." Next, she played brave cop Bansi Kolvalkar opposite Amol Kolhe in the comedy drama revolving around the Maharashtra police in On Duty 24 Taas. Prasanna Hulikavi of Marathi Movie World commented, "Redkar has done a good job as the sub-inspector." Her other two releases of that year were the custom comedy drama Ladi Godi and the thriller drama Target, both opposite Sanjay Narvekar.

In 2011, her first release was the biggest multi-starrer, Shahanpan Dega Deva, which performed moderately at the box office. Marathi Movie World's Ulhas Shirke thought that three girls were just show pieces and were rightly used in the climax scene as item girls. Her next release was Sanjay Jadhav's Fakta Ladh Mhana. It was one of the most anticipated and costliest movies made in Marathi cinemas at the time. Critics found her role totally different in this film.

Redkar next co-starrer in Raju Parsekar's Teen Bayka Fajiti Aika, a romantic comedy film about a husband's complications with his three wives, while she played the second wife to Anaspure's character. A DNA reviewer wrote, "Redkar’s ‘Ingrazi-speaking’ Madhavi is clearly the soul of the film, peppy and refreshing." Under the direction of Ankush Choudhary, she starred in No Entry: Pudhe Dhoka Aahey, the remake of the 2005 Hindi film No Entry. She acted as a suspicious wife to her faithful husband, which was originally played by Lara Dutta. The film received mixed reviews upon release and received her MFK Award for Favourite Actress nomination. Her last release in 2012 was Pipani, directed by Gajendra Ahire. The plot revolves around a Hollywood film maker making a feature film to invite the attention of the world to the tragic state of farmers in the Vidarbha region and the reality behind it. Ulhas Shirke of Marathi Movie World describes her as, "finding the best opportunity to display her talent as an actress in search of a role to win a national award."

She next worked in the romantic drama Love is Vaat and the romantic comedy Kuni Ghar Deta Ka Ghar in 2013. Both films gained mixed responses. Redkar next teamed with Bharat Jadhav and Kedar Shinde for the ninth and fourth time, respectively, in the Kho-Kho, in which she portrayed a ghost, a dancer ancestor who belongs to the Peshwa era and has royal roots. The film was an adaptation of the Shinde comic play Lochya Zhala Re. It was critically and commercially well received.

In 2014, she appeared in the American biographical drama film The Letters, directed by William Riead. The film is based on Mother Teresa’s letters, where Redkar portrayed the role of Deepa Ambereesh, who transforms into Sister Gertrude. For her part, she observed nuns and learned their body language and behaviour. The film premiered at the Sedona Film Festival in February 2014.

=== Unconventional roles and direction (2015 – present) ===
In 2015, her first film was Yudh: Astitvachi Ladai, where she played a psychiatrist who goes against the system and interviews rape victims to bring the rich businessman under the light. The film got negative reviews on release. Her next release was the ensemble relationship drama Sugar Salt Ani Prem. Mihir Bhanage of The Times of India found the three ladies a show stealer. She then appeared alongside Dilip Prabhavalkar, Vandana Gupte, Sanjay Khapare and Manasi Naik in Murder Mestri. It was highly praised by critics and audiences. Murder Mestri won the Best Actress Award at Zee Talkies Comedy Awards.

The same year, she made her directorial debut with period romance Kaakan. The story about a poor guy and rich girl essayed by Jitendra Joshi and Urmila Kothare, respectively. She even wrote the story of the film. Upon release, Kaakan gained a positive response. Ulhas Shirke of Marathi Movie World, calling it a good attempt, further wrote, "Redkar has expertly narrated the story with the present happenings, using flashbacks to show the love story of a girl from a rich family and boy from poor family. She has also tried to show the after effect of a train blast by the terrorists through the character of Wasim, a hard-working tea boy." She received the Golden Camera Award for Best Direction at the Nashik International Film Festival.

Following this in 2016, she starred opposite Subodh Bhave in Kanchan Adhikari's Kiran Kulkarni vs Kiran Kulkarni, the story about the art of living happily while catching the thread of cybercrime. She portrayed a fraudster involved in credit card scams who believes in living the good life and does what she has to in order to get what she wants. Critics found her performance the strength of the film and compared it to Kareena Kapoor from Jab We Met. Jaydeep Pathak of the Maharashtra Times described her as "a surprise package" and wrote that " her graceful, natural acting throughout the film is definitely admirable. This will be an important milestone in her career." She won the Best Actress Award at the AFFA.

In 2017, she once again worked with Bhave and Kothare in the drama Karaar. She depicted the de-glamourized role of a window house help who turns surrogate to a couple who can't get pregnant. Shalaka Nalawade of The Times of India opined, "Kranti happens to be a delight in the scenes she gets, getting the poor but emotional and honest Radha just right" and Mukund Kule of Maharashtra Times appreciated the leads performances but commented that Redkar has to be mentioned separately here and concluded, "Apart from the costumes, her role and acting have got a good combination." For her performance, she won Best Supporting Actress at the Sanskriti Kaladarpan Awards and was nominated for the Filmfare Award for Best Supporting Actress Marathi.

Her next release was Nitin Chandrakant Desai's Truckbhar Swapna, revolving around a taxi driver (played by Makarand Deshpande) who migrates from Konkan village to Mumbai slums along with his wife and two kids for their better education. Mukund Kule of The Times of India commented, "She shines in this film." The next year, she was seen as a police officer in Rocky and as a mother of a cricket aspirant in Baalaa.

== Personal life ==
Redkar and Sameer Wankhede, Zonal Director of the Narcotics Control Bureau (NCB), knew each other from the age of 17, as they were classmates at Ramnarain Ruia College. They didn't keep in touch after graduation, but in 2010, they unintentionally met again at the airport when Redkar was returning from an award show and Wankhede was on duty. They subsequently started dating within a few years, and on 29 March 2017, they got married in a private ceremony. A year later, on 3 December 2018, she gave birth to twin girls, Ziya and Zyada, at Surya Hospital in Mumbai.

== Filmography ==
Key
†	Denotes films that have not yet been released

=== Films ===
==== Acting roles ====
Year	Title	Role	Notes	Ref.
2000	Soon Asavi Ashi	Soonbai		
2003	Gangaajal	Apoorva Kumari	Hindi film	
2005	U, Bomsi n Me	Raji	Hindi film	
2006	Majha Navra Tujhi Bayko	Mohini/Pooja		
2006	Jatra: Hyalagaad Re Tyalagaad	Shevanta		
2006	Ishhya	Herself	Special appearance in the song "Bhamta"	
2007	Soon Majhi Bhagyachi	Vibha		
2007	Ghartyasathi Sar Kahi	Laxmi		
2008	Full 3 Dhamaal	Herself	Special appearance in the song "Tandoori Paaplet"	
2008	Sakkha Savatra	Vijaya Ram Patil		
2008	Gaon Tasa Changala	Sundara		
2009	Mata Ekvira Navsala Pauli	Manjula		
2010	Shikshanachya Aaicha Gho	Nalini		
2010	On Duty 24 Taas	Bansi Kolvalkar		
2010	Ladi Godi	Hema		
2010	Target	Komal		
2011	Shahanpan Dega Deva	Bharat's love interest		
2011	Fakta Ladh Mhana	Shalini		
2011	Morya	Herself	Special appearance in the song "E-mail Kal Internet Var Kela"	
2012	Teen Bayka Fajiti Aika	Madhavi Dhoke		
2012	No Entry: Pudhe Dhoka Aahey	Kaajal	Nominated – MFK Award for Favourite Actress	
2012	Pipaani	Kranti		
2013	Love is Vaat	Sakshi		
2013	Kho-Kho	Koynabai Deshmukh		
2013	Kuni Ghar Deta Ka Ghar	Natasha Patil		
2013	Vanshvel	Herself	Special appearance in song "Ambe Krupa Kari"	
2014	The Letters	Deepa Ambereesh	English film	
2015	Yudh.. Astitvachi Ladai	Dr. Sarangi		
2015	Sugar Salt Ani Prem	Soumya		
2015	Murder Mestri	Saraswati Mestri		
2016	Kiran Kulkarni vs Kiran Kulkarni	Kasturi/Kiran Kulkarni		
2017	Karaar	Radha	Nominated – Filmfare Award Marathi for Best Supporting Actress	
2018	Truckbhar Swapna	Rani		
2019	Rocky	Kalpana		
2019	Baalaa	Nandini Rane		

==== As filmmaker ====
Year	Film	Director	Writer	Notes	Ref.
2015	Kaakan	Yes	Yes		
2026	Maitreyaa	Yes	Yes		
TBA	Rainbow	Yes	Yes		

=== Television ===
Year	Title	Role	Channel	Notes	Ref.
2007-2008	Simply Sapney		Zee Next		
2007	Humsafar The Train	Shivani Gaurav Verma	DD National	Lead Role	
2009	Chittod Ki Rani Padmini Ka Johur	Nagmati	Sony TV		
2017	Sangeet Samrat	Judge	Zee Yuva		
2022	Bus Bai Bus	Special Appearance	Zee Marathi		
2023	Dholkichya Talavar	Judge	Colors Marathi		
2025	Baipan Zindabaad	Manasi	Colors Marathi	In the segment: "Shirt"	

=== Theatre ===
- Shrimant Damodar Pant (2004)
