= Ishq Wala Love =

2014 Indian Marathi romantic drama film

- Theatrical release poster
- Directed by: Renu Desai
- Written by: Renu Desai
- Produced by: Renu Desai
- Starring: Adinath Kothare; Sulagna Panigrahi
- Cinematography: Binod Pradhan
- Edited by: Antara Lahiri
- Music by: Avinash-Vishwajeet; S. J. Surya; Sagar-Madhur
- Production company: Akira Films
- Distributed by: Shree Aadya Films
- Release date: 10 October 2014
- Running time: 175 minutes
- Country: India
- Language: Marathi

Ishq Wala Love is a 2014 Indian Marathi-language romantic drama film written, directed and produced by Renu Desai under the Akira Films and Shree Aadya Films banners. It is the directorial debut film of Desai and stars Adinath Kothare and Sulagna Panigrahi in lead roles, with Suchitra Bandekar, Leena Bhagwat, Bhargavi Chirmule, Sukanya Kulkarni, Apurva Nemlekar, and Vijay Pushkar in supporting roles. The film was released in theatres on 10 October 2014.

== Cast ==
- Adinath Kothare as Ajinkya
- Sulagna Panigrahi as Ovi
- Suchitra Bandekar
- Leena Bhagwat
- Bhargavi Chirmule
- Sukanya Kulkarni- Mone
- Apurva Nemlekar
- Swapnil Bandodkar
- Guru Thakur
- Mangesh Borgaonkar
- Vishwajeet Joshi
- Yogesh Jagam
- Prashant Tapasvi
- Mangesh Desai
- Vijay Pushkar as Neel
- Shrikar Pitre
- Satish Pulekar
- Ravi kumar

== Production ==
Ishq Wala Love is produced by Renu Desai under her home banner Akira Films and was presented by Shree Aadya Films. It is the second production venture of Desai after her Marathi film Mangalashtak Once More. The film marks the directorial debut of Desai.

=== Casting ===
Amruta Khanvilkar was the first choice opposite Adinath Kothare, but then was replaced by Sulagna Panigrahi. Sulagna Panigrahi has previously acted in a few Hindi television serials and the Hindi movie Murder 2. This is Sulagna's debut in the Marathi film industry with Ishq Wala Love.

== Soundtrack ==
Ishq Wala Love

Soundtrack album by Avinash-Vishwajeet, S. J. Surya and Sagar-Madhur
- Released: 22 July 2014
- Genre: Feature film soundtrack
- Length: 44:06
- Label: Shree Aadya Films
- Producer: Renu Desai

Avinash-Vishwajeet chronology
Sanngto Aika (2014)	Ishq Wala Love (2014)	Classmates (2015)

S. J. Surya chronology
Ishq Wala Love (2014)	Isai (2014)

The soundtrack comprises 11 tracks. The film's songs were composed by Avinash-Vishwajeet, Sagar-Madhur and S. J. Suryah (two songs are reused from the delayed film Isai), with lyrics penned by Guru Thakur, Shrirang Godbole, Tanishk Nabar, Sandeep Khare and Sangeeta Barve. The soundtrack was released on 22 July 2014.

=== Track listing ===
Ishq Wala Love
No.	Title	Lyrics	Music	Singer(s)	Length
1.	"Ishq Ho Gaya"	Tanishk Nabar	Sagar-Madhur	Prashant Patil	3:59
2.	"Ase Koni"	Sandeep Khare	S. J. Suryah	Vishwajeet Joshi, Vaishali Samant	5:05
3.	"Tu Nasata"	Guru Thakur	Avinash-Vishwajeet	Aanandi Joshi	1:23
4.	"Tu Dista Man Maze (Duet)"	Guru Thakur	Avinash-Vishwajeet	Swapnil Bandodkar, Aanandi Joshi, Mayur Jadhav	4:02
5.	"Tu Dista"	Guru Thakur	Avinash-Vishwajeet	Swapnil Bandodkar	4:17
6.	"Maze Tuze"	Guru Thakur	Avinash-Vishwajeet	Ketaki Mategaonkar, Mangesh Borgaonkar	3:39
7.	"Jeev Guntala"	Guru Thakur	Sagar-Madhur	Swapnil Bandodkar, Bela Shende	4:21
8.	"Hello Kashi Ahes Tu"	Shrirang Godbole	Avinash-Vishwajeet	Mohit Chauhan	4:53
9.	"Bolto Te"	Sandeep Khare	Avinash-Vishwajeet	Hrishikesh Ranade	5:08
10.	"Bhui Bhuijali"	Sangeeta Barve	Avinash-Vishwajeet	Vaishali Samant, Maithili Joshi, Anandi Joshi	4:52
11.	"Beating Beating"	Guru Thakur	S. J. Suryah	Abhijeet Sawant, Neha Rajpal, Kriti Killedar	4:27
Total length:					44:06

== Release ==
The film was released on 10 October 2014 in theaters of Maharashtra.
