= Yudh: Astitvachi Ladai =

2015 Marathi-language film

- Directed by: Rajiv S. Ruia
- Starring: Rajesh Shringarpure; Tejaswini Pandit; Kranti Redkar
- Cinematography: Suresh Beesaveni
- Edited by: Asif Pathan
- Music by: Vivek Kar
- Release date: 15 May 2015
- Country: India
- Language: Marathi

Yudh: Astitvachi Ladai (transl. War: The battle of existence) is an Indian Marathi language film directed by Rajiv S. Ruia. The film stars Rajesh Shringarpure, Tejaswini Pandit and Kranti Redkar. The film was released on 15 May 2015.

== Synopsis ==
When Ragini's editor declines to publish a rape case report against a rich businessman, she quits her job and meets police officer Guru Nayak. Learning about her story, Guru decides to help her.

== Cast ==
- Rajesh Shringarpure as Guru Nayak
- Tejaswini Pandit as Ragini
- Kranti Redkar as Dr. Sarangi
- Pankaj Vishnu as Ujjwal
- Varsha Usgaonkar
- Smita Oak
- Sanjay Kulkarni
- Somnath Tadwalkar
- Sheetal Mantri

== Soundtrack ==
Yudh: Astitvachi Ladai

Soundtrack album by Vivek Kar
- Released: 2015
- Recorded: 2015
- Genre: Feature film soundtrack
- Length: 20:30
- Language: Marathi

Official audio
- Yudh: Astitvachi Ladai – Full Album on YouTube

Track listing
No.	Title	Singer(s)	Length
1.	"Chal Door Door"	Adarsh Shinde, Swati Sharma	4:08
2.	"Deva Sangna"	Adarsh Shinde	3:51
3.	"Deva Ganesha"	Adarsh Shinde, Dev Negi, Pratap	4:58
4.	"Chal Door Door (unplugged)"	Adarsh Shinde, Swati Sharma	3:31
Total length:			15:48

== Critical response ==
Yudh: Astitvachi Ladai film received negative reviews from critics. Mihir Bhanage of The Times of India gave the film a rating of 2/5 and wrote "To sum it up, Yudh could’ve been a good film but just about manages to be an average one". Ganesh Matkari of Pune Mirror wrote "Ultimately, there is no reason to question the intentions of the film, although it refuses to push the envelope, and ends up delivering a confused and convoluted message". Soumitra Pote of Maharashtra Times gave the film 1 stars out of 5 and wrote "At no level does this film show its solid existence". A reviewer from Loksatta wrote "This Yudh should be called a stray because it did not happen despite having a good scope".
