= Popat (film) =

- Directed by: Satish Rajwade
- Written by: Suhas Shirwalkar
- Screenplay by: Chinmay Kelkar
- Story by: Suvidesh Shingade
- Produced by: Mirah Entertainment Pvt. Ltd and Citrus Check Inns
- Starring: Atul Kulkarni; Siddharth Menon; Ketan Pawar; Amey Wagh
- Cinematography: Samalabhasker
- Edited by: Rajesh Rao
- Music by: Avinash–Vishwajeet
- Production companies: Mirah Entertainment Pvt. Ltd; Citrus Check Inns
- Distributed by: Everest Entertainment Pvt. Ltd.
- Release date: 23 August 2013
- Running time: 160 minutes
- Country: India
- Language: Marathi

Popat (Marathi: पोपट; translation: Parrot) is a Marathi drama film released on 23 August 2013. Produced by Mirah Entertainment Pvt. Ltd and Citrus Check Inns and directed by Satish Rajwade. The film stars Atul Kulkarni, Siddharth Menon, Ketan Pawar, Amey Wagh. The film's music is by Avinash - Vishwajeet.

The film is a journey of young men who explore on the topic of HIV/AIDS and realize that it is not a matter of joke.

== Plot ==
Popat is a movie based in a village, where four friends usually hang out together. One day, they wanted to find out what specialized skills do they possess.

One of them had an experience of being a junior actor, so these guys decide to make a movie on HIV/AIDS. Another one of them owned a camera, which is enough for them to venture onto making their movie. Topic of the movie was chosen as a joke and what they expected to be a rib tickling journey turns out to be one of the most moving experience of their lives.

== Cast ==
- Atul Kulkarni as Janya
- Siddharth Menon as Balya
- Amey Wagh as Raghya
- Ketan Pawar
- Anita Date-Kelkar
- Neha Shitole

== Crew ==
- Director - Aditi Popat
- Story - Satish Rajwade
- Producer - Mirah Entertainment Pvt. Ltd and Citrus Check Inns
- Music Director - Avinash–Vishwajeet
- Cinematographer - Samalabhasker

== Soundtrack ==
Popat

Soundtrack album by Avinash–Vishwajeet
- Released: July 2013
- Genre: Film soundtrack
- Length: 13:56
- Label: Everest Talkies

Avinash–Vishwajeet chronology
Premachi Goshta (2013)	Popat (2013)	Cappuccino (2014)

The songs was composed by Avinash-Vishwajeet with lyrics by Saumitra, Vishwajeet Joshi and Ashwini Shende.

No.	Title	Singer(s)	Length
1	"Karuya Full To Dhingana"	Bela Shende, Prasanajeet Kosambi	4:18
2	"Jara Daba Ki Button Mobilech"	Maithali Panse-Joshi	5:22
3	"Ka Shwaas Ha"	Swapnil Bandodkar	4:36
