= Sugar Salt Ani Prem =

2015 Marathi film

- Directed by: Sonali Bangera
- Starring: Sonali Kulkarni; Sameer Dharmadhikari; Ajinkya Dev; Shilpa Tulaskar; Prasad Oak; Kranti Redkar
- Cinematography: Rahul Jadhav
- Music by: Siddharth Mahadevan
- Release date: 12 June 2015
- Country: India
- Language: Marathi

Sugar Salt ani Prem is an Indian Marathi language film director, writer and produced by Sonali Bangera. The film stars Sonali Kulkarni, Sameer Dharmadhikari, Ajinkya Dev, Shilpa Tulaskar, Prasad Oak and Kranti Redkar. Music by Siddharth Mahadevan. The film was released on 12 June 2015.

== Synopsis ==
When tragedy strikes Soumya, she meets two like-minded women, Ananya and Aditi, who are struggling in their lives. When their bond strengthens, they decide to overcome their problems together.

== Cast ==
- Sonali Kulkarni As Aditi
- Sameer Dharmadhikari as Rahul
- Ajinkya Deo as Ajay
- Kranti Redkar as Soumya
- Shilpa Tulaskar as Ananya
- Prasad Oak as Ravindra

== Soundtrack ==
Sugar Salt ani Prem

Soundtrack album by Siddharth Mahadevan
- Released: 2015
- Recorded: 2015
- Genre: Feature film soundtrack
- Length: 15:35
- Language: Marathi

Official audio
- Sugar Salt aani Prem – Full Album on YouTube

Track listing
| No. | Title | Singer(s) | Length |
|---|---|---|---|
| 1. | "Disha Milali Aaj" | Akriti Kakar, Siddharth Mahadevan | 4:21 |
| 2. | "Mann Mazhey" | Nihira Joshi-Deshpande | 5:07 |
| 3. | "Saangto Goshta Hi" | Shivam Mahadevan | 6:07 |
| Total length: | | | 15:35 |

== Critical response ==
Sugar Salt aani Prem film received positive reviews from critics. Mihir Bhanage of The Times of India gave the film a rating of 3/5 and wrote "The film is a classic example of how a simple story can be turned into something that grips you and gives you a lesson in morality and empowerment". Ganesh Matkari of Pune Mirror wrote "Maybe this is all unimportant for the filmmaker. Maybe these days people believe that doing a good Marathi film is as simple as designing an AI chair. All you need is finance". Abhijeet Thite of Maharashtra Times gave the film 2.5 stars out of 5 and wrote "Although acting and cinematography are good, I feel that more attention should have been paid to the screenplay".
