= Shahanpan Dega Deva =

Shahanpan Dega Deva - Marathi Movie
- Theatrical release poster
- Directed by: Sudesh Manjrekar
- Story by: The story follows five inmates from a mental asylum who accidentally escape and enter the city. They soon discover that the "sane" outside world is not much different from the one they left behind. Upon learning of a conspiracy to destroy the city and an attack on their guardian, Dr. Subodh, the five men take it upon themselves to save him and protect the city.
- Produced by: Mirah Entertainment Pvt. Ltd
- Starring: Mahesh Manjrekar; Bharat Jadhav; Ankush Choudhary; Siddharth Jadhav; Santosh Juvekar; Vaibhav Mangle; Kranti Redkar; Manava Naik
- Music by: Ajit-Sameer
- Release date: 21 January 2011
- Running time: 115 min
- Country: India
- Language: Marathi
- Budget: Estimated 1 Cr

Shahanpan Dega Deva is a 2011 Indian Marathi-language film directed by Sudesh Manjrekar and produced by Mirah Entertainment Pvt. Ltd. It was released on 21 January 2011.

== Cast ==
The cast includes Mahesh Manjrekar as Dr. Subodh, Bharat Jadhav as Dr.patient, Ankush Chaudhari as Actor patient, Siddharth Jadhav as patient, Santosh Juvekar as Himesh, Dhananjay Madrekar as Reshmiya, Vaibhav Mangale as patient, Sanjay Narvekar as Cricketer patient also spacial investigating officer, Kranti Redkar as Bharat Jadhav's wife, Manava Naik as Ankush's Girlfriend, Purva Pawar, Bhalchandra Kadam (Bhau Kadam) as CBI patint, Digambar Naik as patient, Jayraj Nair as patient, Ganesh Revdekar as patient, Ganesh Mayekar as patient, Vidyadhar Joshi as Mental Hospital Doctor Joshi, Kishor Kadam as Mental Hospital Doctor Nayar, Sandeep Pathak as Bumchik Baba, Kamlakar Satpute as Mr. Paden, Vinit Bonde as Dagad, Girish Joshi as Dhonde, Ramesh Vani as Police, Rajdev Jamdade as Police, Atul Kale,Prashant Rane, Sanjeev Rane, Raju Rane, Babu Javkar, Sandeep Desai, Prasanna Bapat, Sudhir Komurlekar, Henry Martis, Shashank Sawant,

== Soundtrack ==
The music is provided by Ajeet and Sameer.
