= Renu Desai =

Indian actor and film director

- Occupations: model; actress; stylist; film director; producer
- Years active: 2000–2003; 2021–present
- Spouse: Pawan Kalyan (m. 2009; div. 2012)
- Children: 2

Renu Desai is an Indian actress, stylist, director, producer and former model known for her works in Telugu cinema.

== Personal life ==
Renu Desai was born in Pune to a Gujarati father and a Marwari mother, and speaks Marathi at home. She has a son, born in 2004 with Telugu actor Pawan Kalyan, whom she married on 28 January 2009. The couple also has a daughter born in 2010. They filed for divorce in 2011, which was finalised in 2012. In 2018, Desai announced that she was engaged, but didn't reveal her fiancé's identity. Later, she decided not to marry anyone and cancelled the marriage plans.

== Career ==
Before her entry into Telugu films, Desai was a model and appeared in the music video of Shankar Mahadevan's song "Breathless".

She starred with her future husband in the films Badri and Johnny. Renu returned to her hometown and is active in Marathi films now. In 2013, she turned producer with Mangalashtak Once More and turned director with Ishq Wala Love in 2014.

== Filmography ==
=== As actress ===
Year	Film	Role	Language	Notes
2000	Badri	Vennela	Telugu	
2000	James Pandu	Renu	Tamil	
2003	Johnny	Geetanjali aka "Geetha"	Telugu	
2023	Tiger Nageswara Rao	Lavanam	Telugu	
2026	O.M: Operation Mole	Amala	Tamil	

==== Television ====
Year	TV Serial	Role	Language	Channel	Notes
2021	Radhamma Kuthuru	Goddess Parvathi	Telugu	Zee Telugu	Guest appearance

=== As director ===
Year	Film	Language	Notes
2014	Ishq Wala Love	Marathi	Also producer

=== As costume designer ===
Year	Film
2001	Kushi
2003	Johnny
2004	Gudumba Shankar
2005	Balu
2006	Annavaram

=== As editor ===
Year	Film	Song
2001	Kushi	"Ye Mera Jaha"
2005	Balu	"Hut Hutja"

=== As producer ===
Year	Film
2012	Mangalashtak Once More
2014	Ishq Wala Love
