= Girish Mohite =

Indian film personality (born 1971)

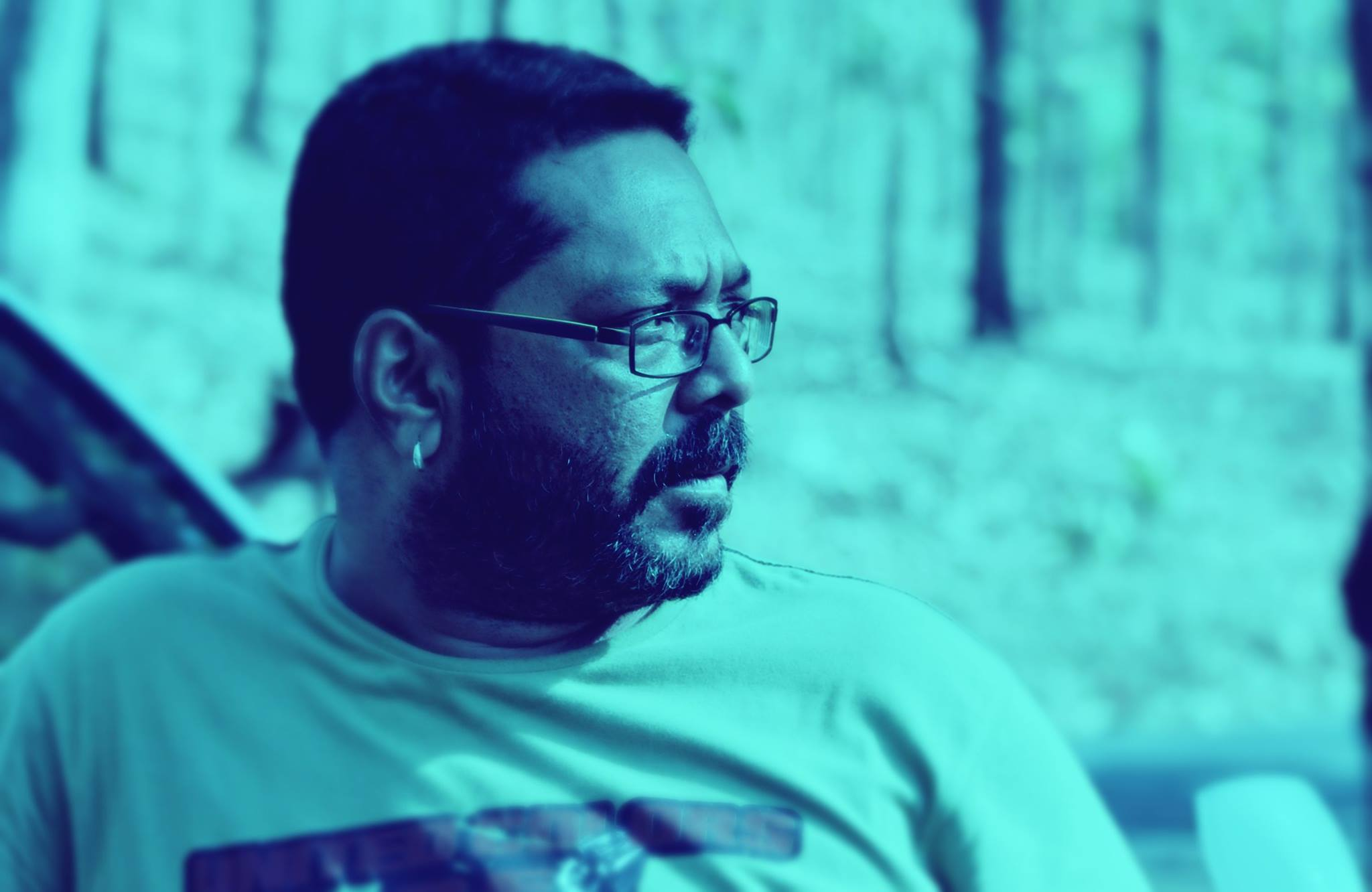
- Born: 8 January 1971 (age 55)
- Occupation: Filmmaker
- Spouse: Shalaka
- Children: Atharva

Girish Mohite (Marathi: गिरीश मोहिते) is an Indian film personality. He is famous for his film Bharatiya and TV serial Ya Gojirvanya Gharat. His latest film Guru Pournima stars Bollywood actor Upendra Limaye and Sai Tamhankar. Girish Mohite's upcoming segment, Bail in 'Bioscope' which was showcased at the Goa Marathi Film Festival. The story is about farmers’ suicides, but through the eyes of an ox. His last release film was Conditions Apply, starring Subodh Bhave and Dipti Devi. And the film Sarvanaam, starring Mangesh Desai.

Girish was Jury member for Indian panorama n national award in year '16. He was winner of Best Director award for his film 'Guru Pournima' in 8th Goa State Film Festival(2014-2015), Marathi feature film category.

His film "Sarvanaam" English title "pale blue dot" was the biggest achieved film showcased in mami piff n international film feststival.
