= Isai (soundtrack) =

Soundtrack album by S. J. Suryah
- Released: 31 October 2014
- Recorded: 2012–2014
- Genre: Feature film soundtrack
- Length: 33:19
- Language: Tamil
- Labels: SS Audio; Divo
- Producer: S. J. Surya

S. J. Suryah chronology
Ishq Wala Love (2014)	Isai (2014)

Singles from Isai
- 1. "Isai Veesi" Released: 17 October 2014

Isai is the soundtrack album to the 2014 film of the same name written and directed by S. J. Suryah, who also composed the film score and soundtrack. The album featured five songs and three instrumentals, with lyrics written by Madhan Karky, Pop Shalini and Georgina Singh. The album was released at a launch event on 31 October 2014 and was distributed through SS Audio and Divo, two days later.

== Development ==
Isai marked the film composition debut of S. J. Suryah. Initially A. R. Rahman was reported to compose music for the film but opted out due to scheduling conflicts. Rahman eventually suggested Suryah to compose music for the film, after being impressed by his knowledge in music. Suryah spent nearly ten hours learning piano and guitar from veteran pianist Abdul Sattar and guitarist Steve Vatz. Deepak, Suryah's nephew, also helped him to learn about chords, while F. S. Faizal, who had scored Suryah's Newtonin Moondram Vidhi (2009), also being his tutor. He took six months for learning music, in order to prepare for the role as well as compose the tunes as well. Since music felt natural for him, besides composing the songs, he also scored the background music as well.

Vaali was initially credited as the lyricist in the film's posters. But later Madhan Karky was signed on after Suryah being impressed with his lyrics. Except for the song "Nee Poiyyaa" sung by Vijay Yesudas, the lyrics were written after the tunes were composed. Citing Rahman's influence, he adopted the technique of arranging the songs after the singers recorded the vocals and allowed them to experiment, which Rahman does.

Suryah further sung the introductory track "Puthandin". He called "Nee Poiyyaa" as the interesting track to compose, as he refrained from the traditional structure of the song by having three continuous pallavis. Singer Vijay Yesudas worked with Suryah to modify the voice mixing for the track. The melody song "Isai Veesi" was recorded by Chinmayi, who also worked on the duet song "Atho Vaanile" with Karthik and Deva and provided background voices for the instrumentals. While recording the song "Isai Veesi", Chinmayi spotted a tonal change in the music, while singing, which Suryah assured that he had done deliberately. The song "Isai Veesi" was also recorded in Marathi as "Ase Koni" from Ishq Wala Love (2014). Pop Shalini wrote and sung the item number "Dirty Dancing", with Georgina Singh as co-lyricist. The song was reused in the same Marathi film as "Beating Beating". The album was recorded and mixed at AM Studios and mixing was handled by Grammy Award-winning sound engineer P. A. Deepak, a collaborator in Rahman's films.

== Release ==
The film's music rights were initially sold to Gemini Audios, but was later released under SS Audio, the subsidiary label of the production company SS Productions, with Divo as the digital partner. Initially, the album was scheduled to be released on 14 February 2014, coinciding with Valentine's Day but was postponed. Later, it was reported that the film's music would be scheduled to be launched in September, which did not happen. A single from the film "Isai Veesi" sung by Chinmayi was released on 17 October 2014. The film's track list was released on 27 October 2014. The soundtrack album was released at the office of Sun TV Network in Chennai on 31 October 2014, with the presence of actors Vijay and Dhanush. However, the album was released to public on 2 November 2014. The audio launch was aired on Sun TV on 9 November 2014.

== Track listing ==
No.	Title	Lyrics	Singer(s)	Length
1.	"Puthaandin"	Madhan Karky	S. J. Suryah, Roshini, Maria Roe Vincent	4:43
2.	"Isai Veesi"	Madhan Karky	Chinmayi	5:20
3.	"Atho Vaanile"	Madhan Karky	Karthik, Chinmayi, Deva	6:01
4.	"Nee Poiyyaa"	Madhan Karky	Vijay Yesudas	6:07
5.	"Dirty Dancing"	Georgina Singh, Pop Shalini	Pop Shalini	4:36
6.	"Lip Lock" (Theme)	—	Chinmayi	1:50
7.	"She Is His Piano" (Theme)	—	Chinmayi	2:19
8.	"Baby" (Theme)	—	Chinmayi	2:21
Total length:				33:19

== Reception ==
Siddharth K. of Sify called it a "very decent attempt by SJ Surya as a composer and his hardwork has paid off big time as songs like 'Isai Veesi', 'Atho Vaanile' has turned out to be good listens." S. Saraswathi of Rediff.com called the music "brilliant". Anupama Subramanian of Deccan Chronicle wrote "Since, Isai is all about music, as a composer also, his music be it songs or BGM, he delivers brilliantly." However, Baradwaj Rangan of The Hindu noted "a film about musicians could have used better music."

== Album credits ==
- Composed and programmed by: S. J. Suryah
- Additional programming: Yadhu Krishnan, Prem
- Harmonies: P. Arun Pandian
- Guitar: Steve Vatz
- Chorus: Santhosh Hariharan, Sreenivas, Deepak, Maalavika Sundar, Veenaa-Murali, Soundarya Bala Nandakumar
- Recorded at: AM Studios (Chennai), Voice Store (Chennai), Enzy Studios (Mumbai)
- Recording engineers: Karthik Sekaran, Subu Shiva
- Mixing: P. A. Deepak, S. Sivakumar
- Mastering: S. Sivakumar
- Music production in-charge: B. Velavan
