= Isay (surname) =

Isay is a surname. Notable people with the surname include:

- David Isay (born 1965), American radio producer
- Richard Isay (1934–2012), American psychiatrist, psychoanalyst, author, and gay activist

== See also ==
- Isa (name)
