= Sandook =

2015 Marathi Comedy thriller film

- Directed by: Atul Kale
- Written by: Atul Kale
- Screenplay by: Ashish Raikar
- Story by: Atul Kale
- Produced by: Vishwajit Gaikwad, Mandar Keni
- Starring: Sumeet Raghavan; Bhargavi Chirmule; Sharad Ponkshe; Arun Nalawade; Rahul Mehendale
- Edited by: Sarvesh Parab
- Music by: Ajit-Samir
- Release date: 5 June 2015
- Running time: 160 minutes
- Country: India
- Language: Marathi

Sandook is a Marathi comedy thriller film starring Sumeet Raghavan and Bharagavi Chirmuley in the lead roles. Sumeet Raghavan is acting for the first time in a Marathi feature film. Sandook is a satirical comic thriller set in pre independence era in a small town. The protagonist Wamanrao Ashtaputre is a simple honest man who always dreams of getting rid of the British Raj. The film was released on 5 June 2015.

== Cast ==
- Sumeet Raghavan as Vamanrao Ashtaputre
- Bhargavi Chirmule as Rukmini Ashtaputre
- Sharad Ponkshe as Shyamrao
- Arun Nalawade as Dinkar rao
- Rahul Mehendale as Bhatkande
- Utpal Sawant as Rajaram
- Ramesh Vani as Murkute
- Rahul Gore as Rana
- J. Brandon Hill as Scott
- Shantanu Gangane as Banya
- Mangesh Satpute as Deven
- Siddhesh Prabhakar as Ganu
- Divesh Medge as Bharat
- Nandkumar Patil as Bharat
- Ajit Parab as Tatu
- Firdaus Mewawala as Billimoria

== Plot ==
Sandook is a satirical comic thriller set in pre independence era in a small town called Sambalgarh. The protagonist Vamanrao Ashtaputre is a simple honest man who always dreams of getting rid of the British Raj. How the underdog that is Vamanrao becomes a revolutionary albeit accidentally is the core story of Sandook which is a comedy film.
