= Kaakan =

- Directed by: Kranti Redkar
- Written by: Kranti Redkar; Omkar Mangesh Datt
- Produced by: Hridaya Banerjee; Sachiin Shinde
- Starring: Jitendra Joshi; Urmila Kanitkar
- Cinematography: Bithin Das
- Edited by: Ashish Mhatre; Apurva Motiwale
- Music by: Ajay Singha
- Production companies: Mangorange Productions; Sachiin Shinde Productions
- Distributed by: Om Rajat Enterprises
- Release date: 10 April 2015
- Running time: 140 minutes
- Country: India
- Language: Marathi

Kaakan (transl. Bangle) is a Marathi language romantic drama film released in 2015 directed by Kranti Redkar starring Jitendra Joshi and Urmila Kanitkar in lead roles. While the film was not a huge success, it became a cult favourite and is considered one of the finest romances in Marathi cinema.

== Plot ==
The movie starts with some boys talking about an old and shabby man named 'Kesu' who lives near a deserted fort. A brave and naughty boy named 'Gopi' goes to the old man's hut to tease the old man but sees the sad emotions in his eyes and returns home. One day when Gopi is trying to catch a fish near the river, he slips and falls in the river. After some time he wakes up unconsciously lying on the river bank.He remembers he was saved by Kishu. Thereafter Gopi and Kesu become friends, after which Gopi tries to know about Kesu from the villagers. Kesu was in love with Sudha and they both wanted to marry each other, but due to the poor economic conditions of Kesu, Sudha's parents were against their love. One day when they both were sitting on a boat, Sudha falls in the lake. Kesu saves her but in the attempt, her gold bangle falls in the lake. Sudha's mother scolds her for the lost bangle which she informs Kesu and he promises to return it to her. Kesu sells all his land and goes to the city to buy a bangle for her. Meanwhile, Sudha's parents marry her off to a rich man against her will. Kesu heartbroken finds a married Sudha in the city but Sudha refuses to see him. Heartbroken Kesu never comes out of this shock and roams his village like a beggar. Gopi feels bad for Kesu hearing the story. Kesu's health worsens and Gopi promises to search for Sudha so Kesu could fulfill his last wish to see and gift her the bangle. Gopi goes to the city and finds Sudha but she refuses to return to the village but nevertheless comes to the village with her husband. Sudha meets Kesu and tells him to put the bangle in her hand. Kesu takes his last breath in the arms of his loving Sudha.

== Cast ==
- Jitendra Joshi as Kesu
- Urmila Kanitkar as Sudha
- Ashutosh Gaikwad
- Ashok Shinde as Sudha's husband
- Madhavi Juvekar
- Priyal Naik

== Release and reception ==
Kaakan was released on 10 April 2015. Pune Mirror rated the movie with two and a half star saying that Kaakan would be only appealing to a specific type of audience, which prefers a quick dose of emotional melodrama.

== Music ==
Soundtracks for Kaakan is composed by debut music director Ajay Singha.

No.	Title	Artist(s)	Length
1.	"Kaakan"	Shankar Mahadevan & Neha Rajpal	4:48
2.	"Wedyancha Ghar Unnhat"	Swapnil Bandodkar	4:32
3.	"Athya Pathya"	Shriram Iyer Anish	3:16
4.	"Kaakan (Reprise)"	Raman Mahadevan & Neha Rajpal	5:26
5.	"Suki Poli"	Shriram Iyer Anish	3:56
6.	"Saajana"	Hamsika Iyer	3:57
