= Rakt =

Village in the Netherlands

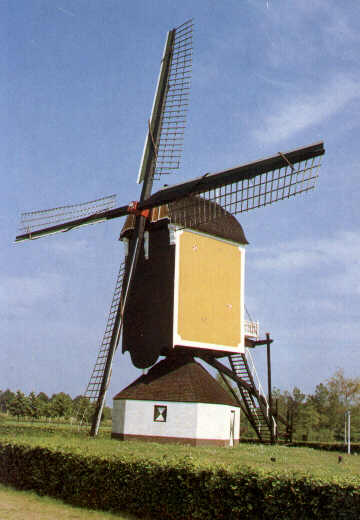
Molen van Jetten

Rakt 51°40′35″N 5°34′55″E is a village in the former municipality of Uden, North Brabant, the Netherlands. Since 2022 it has been part of the new municipality of Maashorst.

The site of a famous windmill, Molen van Jetten (built in 1811 and moved to its current location in 1900), Rakt is also home to FC de Rakt, an amateur football club founded in 1968 with its homeground at the Moleneind, below the mill. Each year the club organises a football tournament in the fields surrounding the mill.

== FC de Rakt ==
In September 2008 the local amateur women's football team FC de Rakt (FC de Rakt DA1) made international headlines by swapping their old kit for a new one featuring skirts and fitted shirts. The reason being the team felt the kits were more comfortable, since women's teams often had to use clothes designed for men's bodies, rather than women's shorts and women's shirts.
