= Premachi Goshta (film) =

- Theatrical release poster
- Directed by: Satish Rajwade
- Written by: Satish Rajwade (story); Chinmay Kelkar (dialogues)
- Screenplay by: Chinmay Kelkar
- Produced by: Ihita Enterprises Pvt. Ltd.
- Starring: Atul Kulkarni; Sagarika Ghatge
- Cinematography: Suhas Gujrati
- Edited by: Rajesh Rao
- Music by: Avinash-Vishwajeet
- Production company: Ihita Enterprises Pvt. Ltd
- Distributed by: Citrus Check Inns; Mirah Entertainment Pvt. Ltd
- Release date: 1 February 2013
- Running time: 135 minutes
- Country: India
- Language: Marathi

Premachi Goshta (transl. Story of Love) is a 2013 Indian Marathi-language film directed by Satish Rajwade. The film released on 1 February 2013. The film features Atul Kulkarni and Sagarika Ghatge in lead roles and Sulekha Talwalkar, Satish Rajwade and Rohini Hattangadi in supporting roles.

The film marks the debut of actress Sagarika Ghatge in Marathi. A dialogue in the film hints that the story could be inspired from A Midsummer Night's Dream, a play by William Shakespeare. The first look promo of the film was released on 18 December 2012 in an event organized at the Citylight Cinema, Mahim.

== Plot ==
The story of the film is of two strangers, Ram and Sonal, who meet at the marriage counsellor's office, start talking with each other and get to know each other. Ram is in the office trying to maintain his marriage with Ragini, who is an aspiring actress. Ram believes that she would return to him. Whereas Sonal has lost all faith in marriage and is here to get divorced from Samit. They both meet again in very strange situation. Sonal was trying to get a job and come to Ram's office without knowing that she'll be interviewed by Ram himself. Eventually Sonal gets a job as Ram's associate. Sonal develops feelings for Ram. But Ram, the man with values, still hopes that his wife will return. After reading Ram's story about Love, Sonal suggests Ram that he should tell his story to producers because anybody would fall in Love after reading his story. He does that and eventually he gets the offer from a producer because the producer likes the story very much. Just when Ram was about to propose Sonal, her husband comes into the picture, and Ram starts staying away from Sonal. At the same time, Ram's wife realizes her mistake of leaving Ram and comes back to his life, but Ram is now deeply in love with Sonal. They both face very difficult phase as they realize they can't confess their love due to their mutual misunderstanding. Finally, Ram's wife realizes that Ram no longer loves her and he loves Sonal instead, she tells Ram to go to Sonal and confess his feelings. At the same time, Sonal realizes that her husband is good for nothing and decides to come back to Ram. After so much hustle, they both meet at the office again and confess their true feelings and here ends the tale of a simple yet beautiful love story between Ram and Sonal.

== Cast ==
Atul Kulkarni, who is the two times winner of the National Film Award for Best Supporting Actor and has played various character roles, would be seen for the first time in a romantic role. Sagarika Ghatge who is known for her role of the hockey player Preeti Sabarwal in the 2007 Bollywood film Chak De! India makes her debut in Marathi cinema through this film. Also the film marks comeback of BAFTA Award winner Rohini Hattangadi in Marathi cinema after a long duration. The film is directed by Satish Rajwade whose previous Marathi film Mumbai-Pune-Mumbai was quite successful.

- Atul Kulkarni as Ram Subramanyam
- Sagarika Ghatge as Sonal
- Rohini Hattangadi as Ram's mother
- Sulekha Talwalkar as Ragini
- Meera Welankar
- Ajay Purkar as Samit
- Satish Rajwade as Swaraj

== Soundtrack ==
Premachi Goshta

Soundtrack album by Avinash-Vishwajeet
- Released: January 2013
- Genre: Film soundtrack
- Length: 15:00
- Label: Everest Talkies

Avinash-Vishwajeet chronology
Dhaaghedore (2012)	Premachi Goshta (2013)	Popat (film) (2013)

The lyrics for the film were penned by Ashwini Shende and Vishwajeet Joshi with music and background score composed by the duo Avinash-Vishwajeet.

No.	Title	Singer(s)	Length
1	"Olya Sanjveli" (Duet)	Bela Shende, Swapnil Bandodkar	5:19
2	"Olya Sanjveli" (Unplugged)	Ashish Sharma	4:32
3	"Haravto Sukhacha"	Bela Shende, Hrishikesh Ranade & Kailash Kher	5:49

== Promotion and reception ==
The film was promoted by the lead actors in a unique way, by organizing a kite festival on 14 January 2013, the day of Makar Sankranti. More than 1500 kites were flown, which had film's name on them. Although the film has a clichéd love-story plot, the film has been appreciated for putting forth "love beyond relationship". The Times of India gave the film 3 out of 5 stars and wrote "In short, this is a simple, sweet love story. It is young at heart at the same time mature in presentation. This movie can offer you a ‘sweet break’!!
