= Manjrekar =

Manjrekar is a surname. Notable people with the surname include:

- Mahesh Manjrekar (born 1953), Indian film director, actor, writer, and producer
- Minad Manjrekar (born 1996), Indian cricketer
- Sanjay Manjrekar (born 1965), Indian cricketer
- Vijay Manjrekar (1931–1983), Indian cricketer
