= Neha Rajpal =

Indian singer, anchor and producer

Nehha Rajpal
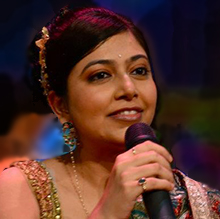
- Spouse: Akash Rajpal
- Musical career
- Born: Neha Chandna; 23 June 1978 (age 48)
- Origin: Dombivli, Maharashtra, Maharashtra, India
- Genres: Ghazal, Filmi, Hindustani classical music
- Occupations: Singer, Producer, Composer
- Instrument: Vocals
- Years active: 1995–present
- Website: www.neharajpal.com

Neha Rajpal (née Chandna) (born 23 June 1978) is a producer, singer and anchor in the Indian music industry, Hindi films, and especially the Marathi regional music industry. Winner of the prestigious Hindi Zee TV reality Music show – Saregamapa in 2004 Neha has also performed in various other Indian languages including Bengali, Kannada, Telugu, Sindhi, Gujarati and Chhattisgarhi. Neha spells her name as 'Nehha'. Neha has produced her maiden Marathi film PhotoCopy under the banner "Neha Rajpal Productions" in association with Viacom18. The film written by national award winner Vijay Maurya and Yogesh Vinayak Joshi released in 2016. Its music was highly appreciated and it went on to win the best music album of the year (Listeners Choice) against blockbuster like Sairat. She sang the 'Sridevi' Hindi dubbed song of Telegu movie Waltair_Veerayya composed by Pushpa movie director Devi_Sri_Prasad and picturised on Superstar Cheeranjivi and Shruti Hassan

== Education ==
She was born on 23 June 1978 in Dombivli, Maharashtra, India, and did her schooling in Model English School, Pandurangwadi and went on to become a medical professional. She is an MBBS doctor by qualification.

She did her medical schooling from MGM Medical College, Kamothe, Navi Mumbai.

She was trained in classical vocals by Guru Vibhavari Bandhavkar of Kirana gharana.

She was trained in light music by music director Anil Mohile.

== Career ==
- Her first playback song was 'Din Din Diwali' from Marathi Film 'Manus' under the music direction of Mr. Anil Mohile.
- Her major Hindi film song was 'Ek Baicheni' from Nayee Padosan of Shankar–Ehsaan–Loy.
- Her single 'Bekarar' in Hindi was penned by her husband Akash Rajpal who is a writer in the Indian film industry and a healthcare professional. The song had been released digitally by Strawberry Records India.
- Her famous songs include:
  - Mann He Bavare a single made by her own production house "Neha Rajpal Productions"
  - 'Fulnara Mausam from Mukkam Post London'
  - Tu Manat from Fakt Ladha Manha
  - Oth Olavle from Shubh Mangal Savadhan
  - De-Dhakka from De-Dhakka
  - Maharashtra Geet from Mee Shivaji Raaje Boltoe'
  - Madaalasa me tujhi menaka from Satya Savitree Satyawan
  - Khamoshiyan TV Serial Title Track on Star Plus
  - Anubhuti concert
  - Ganesh Dudu Dudu dhavat ye (Mangal Murti Ashtavinayak Album on T-series)
  - Madalasa (Satya Savitri Satyavan film)
  - Film Nati
  - Mann he bavare Featured in Gaane Manatale section of Maharashtra Times
  - Film Campus Katta
  - Dhinchyack Bollywood songs in Marathi on Tseries
  - Navara Majha Bhavara film song
  - Khamoshiyaan title track
  - Collegechya kattyawar
  - Pune via Bihar
  - Arre Awaz konacha film
  - Me Shivaji Raje bhosale bolatoy
  - Balak Palak
  - Diwali pahat prog with Anil Mohile n Pandit Hridaynath Mangeshkar
  - Ek hazarachi note
  - Tujhi majhi lovestory
  - Bhatukali
  - Vatsalya
  - Time please
- She has sung a song 'Ek Bechainee'in Shankar Ehsaan Loy's Hindi Film Nayee Padosan.
- Nehha performed live at the Ashwamedh Marathi Fusion Concert where she sang yesteryear Marathi melodies on modern fusion arrangements created by noted Indian classical instrumentalist Abhijit Pohankar
- Nehha performed during the Diwali Pahat along with other sinor industry colleagues like Padmaja Fenade and other. The event was performed live in front of eminent personalities like the Mayor of Mumbai and political leaders. The event was conducted by Music Director Anil Mohile.
- Neha has sung various songs in the Marathi Ganpati Albums 'Ganesha dudu dudu dhavat ye (गणेशा दुडू दुडू धावत ये) and Mangalmurtir Ashtavinayak (मंगलमूतीर् अष्टविनायक)
- Various songs of Nehha can be heard on a music aggregation site
- Various live musical performances of Nehha can be viewed on video aggregation sites
- She launched her maiden production venture "Neha Rajpal Productions" through a song titled "Mann He Bavare", a Marathi Single with its video on 14 February 2014. The song launched on 9x Jhakaas and Radio City (Indian radio station) on the same day.
- Her "Neha Rajpal Productions" has produced the popular poetry section called "Jhakaas Kavita" on 9x Jhakaas

=== Awards and Trophies ===
- Neha's route to fame was winning the prestigious Hindi Zee TV reality Music show – Saregamapa in 2004.
- Neha has won several awards including the prestigious Zee Gaurav Puraskar for best Female Playback Singing in year 2008 for her song "Fulnara Mausam" from film "Mukkam post London".

=== Judge / Anchor / Host ===
- Nehha is a longest-serving anchor of a popular Marathi TV show on the Doordarshan Sahyadri channel, hosting the popular musical game show 'Antakshari'. She has had different co- anchors over a period of time including the veteran Prashant Damle, and comedian Atul Parchure.
- She judged the first season of "Gaurav Maharashtracha" of saibaba telefilms for ETV Marathi along with Swapnil Bandodkar and Abhijit Pohankar.

== Marathi songs ==
Year	Film	Song name	Composer	Co-singer(s)
2010	Huppa Huiyya	"Vakda Tikda"	Ajit Parab	Swapnil Bandodkar
2011	Fakta Ladh Mhana	"Tu Manat Tu"	Ajit Parab	Swapnil Bandodkar, Ajit Parab
2013	Nati	"Hur Hur Hi" "Chatak Matak"	Nikhil Mahamuni	Javed Ali; Anand Shinde
2014	Ishq Wala Love	"Beating Beating"	S.J Suryah	Abhijeet Sawant; Kirti Killedar
2015	Kaakan	"Kaakan"	Ajay Singha	Shankar Mahadevan
2016	Photocopy	"Tu Jithe Mi Tithe"	Nilesh Moharir	Swapnil Bandodkar
2017	Tula Kalnnaar Nahi	"Tula Kalnnaar Nahi"	Amitraj	Swapnil Bandodkar

== Honours ==
- She was given the opportunity to inaugurate the Maharashtra Times Carnival along with a well known celebrity Mr Abhishek Bachchan
- She has inaugurated the release of a music compilation 'Nile Akash' of poet Shankar Pandit
- Marathi Abhimaangeet
  - Nehha was part of the historic Marathi song (created by Eminent Music director Kaushal Inamdar) where more than 450 accomplished singers come together to single song to make this song a collage of melodious voices.
- Nehha was given the opportunity to inaugurate the prestigious Marathi Vishwakosh (Third Edition) (Marathi language encyclopaedia) along with prominent dignitaries like Former Mumbai University Vice-Chancellor Dr. Snehalata Deshmukh and others
- Nehha was featured in a leading newspaper among prominent playback singers of Marathi Music Industry. The article speaks about the changing trends in Marathi music and how the singers like Nehha have shaped it with experimentation
- Nehha got the honour of composing a song "माझी मराठी मराठी... तिचे कौतुक कौतुक" written for the Marathi Encyclopedia Project of Government of India.
- Nehha got the honour of being a guest editor of Lokmat news papers on occasion of women's day on 8 March 2013 .
- Release of Third khand of Vishwakosh
- MaharashtraTimes celebrity female cricket

== Movie production ==
Neha Rajpal has produced the movie Photocopy under her banner "Neha Rajpal Productions" which got released in partnership with Viacom18.

== Others ==
- Nehha participated in the World AIDS Day Rally organised by Dr L H Hiranandani Hospital at Powai, Mumbai to spread awareness on HIV and AIDS. She performed live at the event along with Indian Idol Winner Abhijeet Sawant and 2005 Sa Re Ga Pa Ma finalists
- Nehha is a Director in a Social Enterprise organisation called "Ekohealth"
- Nehha Rajpal has also sung famous serial's title song Yeh Aap Beeti hai of Aap Beeti Serial.

== Awards ==
- Maharashtra State Film Award for Best Female Playback Singer at the 52nd Maharashtra State Film Awards, for the song "Kakan" from the film Kaakan.
- Zee Chitra Gaurav Puraskar for Best Playback Singer – Female For Song Phulnara Masum tu From the Movie Mukkam Post London.
- Zee Chitra Gaurav Puraskar for Best Playback Singer – Female For Song Kaakan From the Movie Kaakan.
- Zee Chitra Gaurav Puraskar for Best Playback Singer – Female For Song Tu jithe mi tithe From the Movie Photocopy.
- Chitra padarpan Puraskar 2016 - Best Lyricist (Photocopy)
- Chitra padarpan Puraskar 2016 - Best Music Composer(Photocopy)
