= Photocopy (film) =

- Directed by: Vijay Maurya
- Screenplay by: Vijay Maurya; Yogesh Joshi
- Story by: Akash Rajpal; Omkar Mangesh Datt
- Produced by: Neha Rajpal; Akash Rajpal
- Starring: Vandana Gupte; Parna Pethe; Chetan Chitnis
- Cinematography: Manoj Kumar Khatoi
- Edited by: Ninad Khanolkar
- Music by: Nilesh Moharir; AV Prafullachandra; Praful Karlekar; Rohan Rohan; Shreyas Puranik; Neha Rajpal
- Production companies: Neha Rajpal Productions; Viacom 18 Motion Pictures
- Distributed by: Viacom 18 Motion Pictures
- Release date: 16 September 2016
- Country: India
- Language: Marathi

PhotoCopy is a 2016 Marathi language Indian romantic comedy film directed by Vijay Maurya and produced by singer and first-time producer Neha Rajpal. The film is based on a story written by Indian entrepreneur Akash Rajpal and Omkar Mangesh Datt. The movie debuts Chetan Chitnis and Parna Pethe in the lead roles. Parna plays a double role in the film, portraying the characters of identical twin sisters falling in love with the same boy played by Chetan. Filming began in April 2015 & released on 16 September 2016 in partnership with Viacom 18 Motion Pictures. The movie was extensively shot in Lavasa. Movie's music was well acclaimed, & it won the popular Radio Mirchi's best music album of the year (Listeners Choice) award.

== Synopsis ==
Identical twin sisters fall in love with the same boy. The boy till the end due to various circumstances does not realise that he is actually dating two sisters and the sisters do not know that either. The plot is a romantic comedy with drama and humour set in a college backdrop.

== Plot ==
Madhu & Mala (Parna Pethe) are identical twin sisters who live with their granny (Vandana Gupte). Madhu is an extrovert & fun-loving girl, while Mala is introverted, studious and studying medicine. Troubled by Madhu's prankster antics, the Principal of her college nominates her for the inter-college quiz competition, which basically is a trap to punish her for inevitable failure in competition as Madhu is not smart enough to face the competition. Madhu pleads to Mala to go in her place to the competition which she accepts. In the competition, Mala meets Sameer Wankhede and both fall in love. The next day Sameer comes across Madhu thinking she is Mala & asks for her phone number. Madhu realizing the confusion gives Mala's phone number without giving much of a thought to romantic sparks between the two.

Mala wants to date Sameer but her friend warns her that Sameer is thinking that he is dating Madhu & she would have to take her avatar to date him and consequence of it. Mala doesn't have much of sense of fashion while Madhu is very trendy with her get-up. Once randomly when she comes across Sameer, he fails to notice her in a simplistic get-up the way she is. Mala then comes to terms with the fact that she has to present herself as Madhu in order to date Sameer. He quickly adapts to Madhu's lifestyle & starts dating Sameer.

On the other hand, Madhu is swayed by the fancy bikes & cars that Sameer owns & falls for him. One fine day there is a minor tiff between Mala & Sameer so she cuts herself from Sameer for a while. The next day Sameer comes to her home and hands over an invitation for his b'day party, but since Mala has locked herself in her room he hands it to her granny. Madhu accidentally reads it & goes to the party with her friends. As Sameer is anxiously waiting for Mala to arrive at his party he calls her on phone. Mala is overjoyed & goes to the party as well. Since Madhu has arrived before Mala, Sameer proposes to Madhu thinking she is Mala. Mala is heartbroken & leaves the party. Now Madhu starts dating Sameer & deftly changes the Mala's number to her number on his phone. Mala's friend seeing this tries to bond Sameer with Mala with help of friends of Madhu, but Madhu vehemently opposes any such effort. A few days later Sameer proposes to Madhu for marriage and she accepts his proposal without consulting anyone. Her grandmother is concerned since Madhu is involved in casual dating in past & she may not be truly in love with Sameer. However, Madhu is firm on her decision without giving any thought to this. Mala is concerned about the same and warns her not ruin life of Sameer & they have a big verbal fight over this.

Their granny on the day of engagement catches Madhu pretending to be Mala & learns about the whole story, their fight & how Mala had left home 25 days back to attend a medical camp, an escape from all this emotional turnmoil. She is heartbroken but decides to let Madhu take decision for her own. As Sameer is about to put the engagement ring in her finger, her guilt finally catches with her & she confesses to everything in front of everyone. Sameer then quickly drives to Mala's medical camp & reconciles with her.

== Cast ==
- Vandana Gupte plays the character of a fun-loving grandmother of the twin sisters
- Parna Pethe plays a double role as Identical Twin Sisters Madhu and mala
- Chetan Chitnis as the lead male actor
- Manmeet Pem as Babanrao urf Babya, Madhu's friend
- Anshuman Joshi as Devashish
- Ashay Kulkarni as Madhu’s friend
- Manasi Bhawalkar as the male leads sister
- Yashoman Apte as unknown

== Production ==
- Neha Rajpal – producer
- Akash Rajpal – producer
- Ranjit Gugle – executive producer
- Neha is producing Photocopy under her production banner "Neha Rajpal Productions". The Film is slated to be released in 2016
- Screen Play & Dialogues is written by Vijay Maurya and Yogesh Vinayak Joshi.
- The story is written by Omkar Mangesh Datt and Akash Rajpal.
- The film's casting is being done by Rohan Mapuskar.
- Vandana Gupte is playing a fun loving grand mother of the identical twin sisters.

== Announcements ==
The making and title of PhotoCopy was teased by the producers right from who the director could be, title of the movie and the cast. Various news channels and print media have been unfolding the key aspects of the film as and when it is revealed.
