= Tyagraj Khadilkar =

Indian singer and music composer

- Birth name: Tyagraj
- Born: 11 June 1967
- Occupation: Singer
- Instrument: Vocalist
- Years active: 1993–present

Tyagraj Khadilkar is an Indian singer, music composer, actor and host in Marathi film industry. He was the contestant of Bigg Boss Marathi 1 and was Evicted on Day 56.

== Childhood ==
Tyagraj Khadilkar is from the musical family of Krushnaji Prabhakar Khadilkar in Kolhapur. He is also the brother of Amruta Natu who is a well known play back singer in Marathi music industry. He completed his initial schooling in Kolhapur and then moved to Pune. He completed his schooling at Modern High School, Pune and graduated from PES Modern College of Engineering Pune. He received music education from his mother Manjushri Khadilkar and Indirabai Khadilkar and Gangadhar buva Pimpalkhare.

== Career ==
Tyagraj has sung more than 52 title tracks of Marathi TV shows. He has worked with few music composers like Datta Davjekar, Anil Mohile, Shridhar Phadke, Ram-Lakshman, Ashok Patki and Avadhoot Gupte. He has given a play back to more than 35 Marathi movies.

He has also worked as a TV host of programs including Aarahi, Geetakshri, Naman Natawara, Tikal Te Political and Sher-E-Nagma.

He has sung more 60 title songs of TV serials including Hamm Panch, Tutaki Bajake and Tikal Te Political.

=== Play back singer and Composer ===
- Shodh 2003
- Limited Manusaki 1995
- Shivarayachi Soon Taratani 1993
- Thaiman 2007
- Chalu Navra Bholi Bayko
- Kay Dyacha Bola
- Jau Tethe Khau 2007

=== Television ===
- Bigg Boss Marathi 1 as Contestant (evicted on day 56)

== Awards ==
- Manik Verma award by Sur Singer Sansad and All India Natya Parishad
- Voice Choice award for Sa Re ga Ma Hindi on Zee TV Hindi

== Personal life ==
Tyagraj is married to Veena Khadilkar. They have a daughter and a son. His sister Amruta is also a singer. She had participated in Sa re ga ma musical program on Zee TV.
