= List of Marathi films of 2017 =

A list of films produced by the Marathi language film industry based in Maharashtra, released in the year 2017

== Box office collection ==
| Rank | Film | Worldwide gross | Ref. |
|---|---|---|---|
| 1 | Sachin: A Billion Dreams | ₹76.86 crore (US$8.0 million) | |
| 2 | Ti Saddhya Kay Karte | ₹22.54 crore (US$2.3 million) | |
| 3 | FU: Friendship Unlimited | ₹9 crore (US$930,000) | |
| 4 | Boyz | ₹8.40 crore (US$870,000) | |
| 5 | Faster Fene | ₹8 crore (US$830,000) | |
| 6 | Muramba | ₹7 crore (US$730,000) | |
| 7 | Fugay | ₹4 crore (US$420,000) | |

== January – March ==
| Opening | Title | Director | Cast | Genre | IMDb | Source |
|---|---|---|---|---|---|---|
| 6 January | Ti Saddhya Kay Karte | Satish Rajwade | Ankush Chaudhari, Tejashree Pradhan Ketkar, Abhinay Berde | Romance Drama | | |
| 6 January | Zala Bobhata | Anup Jagdale | Dilip Prabhavalkar, Bhalchandra Kadam | Comedy Drama | | |
| 13 January | Vajra | Mayur Karambalikar | Rahul Solapurkar, Ulhas Adhav, Abhineet Pange, Meera Patharkar | Suspense | | |
| 20 January | Veeda Ek Sangharsh | Vijay Shinde | Anil Mali, Shubhangi Latkar, Anant Jog | Drama | | |
| 3 February | Baghtos Kay Mujra Kar | Hemant Dhome | Jitendra Joshi, Aniket Vishwasrao, Akshay Tanksale | Drama | | |
| 10 February | Dhyanimani | Chandrakant Kulkarni | Mahesh Manjrekar, Ashwini Bhave | Thriller | | |
| 10 February | Fugay | Swapna Waghmare Joshi | Swwapnil Joshi, Subodh Bhave, Prarthana Behere, Neeta Shetty | Romcom | | |
| 17 February | Gaon Thor Pudhari Chor | Pitambar Kale | Digambar Naik, Prema Kiran, Chetan Dalvi, Siya Patil, Kishor Nandalskar, Kanchan Bhor | Political Satire | | |
| 17 February | Ranjan | Prakash Janardan Pawar | Yash Kulkarni, Gauri Kulkarni, Bhalchandra Kadam, Bharat Ganeshpure | Romance, Drama | | |
| 17 February | Hakk | Gorakh Jogdande | Milind Gawali, Smita Shewale, Tanvi Hegde | Action, Drama | | |
| 17 February | Zenda Swabhimanacha | Vishwas Ranjane | Teshwani Vetal, Akshay Kharat | Drama | | |
| 24 February | Shyamchi Shala | Prakash Jadhav | Arun Nalawade, Vijay Patkar, Vijay Kadam, Milind Shinde | Drama | | |
| 3 March | Premaya Namah | Jagdish Watharkar | Devendra, Rupali Krishnarao | Romance | | |
| 10 March | Talav | Jaibhim Kamble and Pramod Shrivastav | Saurabh Gokhale, Sanjay khapre, Priyanka Raut, Navneet Phondke and Varsha Pawar | Romance, Action | | |
| 10 March | Journey Premachi | Amol Bhave | Abhishek Sethiya, Kashmira Kulkarni, Madhav Deochakke, Atul Abhyankar, Parag Bandekar, Pradeep Patwardhan, Neelu Pathak, Deepjyoti Naik, Sunny Charls | Romance | | |
| 17 March | Garbh | Subhash Ghorpade | Sushant Shelar, Siya Patil, Nishigandha Wad, Anant Jog | Drama | | |
| 24 March | Manus Ek Mati | Suresh Shankar Zade | Siddharth Jadhav, Harsha Gupte, Ruchita Jadhav | Drama | | |
| 31 March | Kanika | Pushkar Manohar | Sharad Ponkshe, Smita Shewale | Horror, Revenge | | |
| 31 March | Nagarsevak Ek Nayak | Deepak Kadam | Upendra Limaye, Neha Pendse, Sayaji Shinde, Ganesh Yadav, Sunil Tawde, Sanjay Khapre | Action, Drama | | |

== April – June ==
| Opening | Title | Director | Cast | Genre | IMDb | Source |
|---|---|---|---|---|---|---|
| 7 April | Marathon Zindagi | Shakir and Inayat Shaikh | Sushil Bhosale, Vikram Gokhale, Sanjay Narvekar, Girirsh Pardeshi, Anil Nagarkar, Sunil Godbole and Sangram Surdeshmukh | Drama | | |
| 7 April | Brave Heart | Das Babu | Sangram Samel, Dhanshree Kadgaonkar, Ashish Wadde, Rohan Ubhe, Abhay Kulkarni, Arun Nalawade, Atul Parchure | Drama | | |
| 14 April | Rubik's Cube | Mahesh Manjrekar | Gashmeer Mahajani, Mrunmayee Deshpande, Surabhi Bhosale, Pooja Muley & Sidhaant Muley | Romance | | |
| 14 April | Saha Gunn | Kiran Gawade | Sunil Barve, Amruta Subhash, Archit Deodhar | Drama | | |
| 14 April | Sangharsh Yatra | Sakar Raut | Sharad Kelkar, Shruti Marathe, Aashish Wadde, Girish Pardeshi, Rajesh Kulkarni | Drama | | |
| 14 April | Ichak | Ganesh Dharmadhikari | Avinash Kshirsagar, Rutuja Lawand, Priyanka Patil, Bhagyashree Shinde | Drama, Thriller | | |
| 21 April | Shivya | Sakar Raut | Bhushan Pradhan, Sanskruti Balgude | Drama, Thriller | | |
| 21 April | Gopya | Raj Paithankar | Kamlesh Sawant, Ajay Jadhav, Uday Sabnis | Drama | | |
| 21 April | Shoor Amhi Sardar | Prakash Jadhav | Mohan Joshi, Shantanu Moghe, Bharat Ganeshpure, Sayaji Shinde | Drama, Action | | |
| 5 May | Rairand | Ramesh Nanaware | Anant Jog, Ranjeet Kamble, Anand Wagh, Ashish Nigurkar | Drama | | |
| 19 May | Chi Va Chi Sau Ka | Paresh Mokashi | Lalit Prabhakar, Mrinmayee Godbole | Romance | | |
| 19 May | Great My India | Shashikant Doiphode | Dharmendra Yadav, Aarya Ghare, Shirish Khedkar | Drama | | |
| 26 May | Sachin: A Billion Dreams | James Erskine | Sachin Tendulkar, Mayuresh Pem | Biographical film | | |
| 26 May | Oli Ki Suki | Anand Gokhale | Subodh Bhave, Tejashree Pradhan, Bhargavi Chirmule | Drama, Thriller | | |
| 26 May | Karaar | Manoj Kotiyan | Subodh Bhave, Urmila Kanitkar, Kranti Redkar | Drama | | |
| 26 May | Khopa | Sudhir Nikam | Sankarshan Karhade, Aishwarya Tupe, Bharat Ganeshpure, Asha Tare, Ketan Pawar, Vikram Gokhale | Drama, Thriller | | |
| 26 May | Tatva | Arun Nalawade | Sanjay Shejwal, Gauri Konge | Drama | | |
| 2 June | FU: Friendship Unlimited | Mahesh Manjrekar | Akash Thosar, Satya Manjrekar, Vaidehi Parshurami, Sanskruti Balgude | Comedy, Action | | |
| 2 June | Muramba | Varun Narvekar | Amey Wagh, Mithila Palkar, Sachin Khedekar, Chinmayee Sumeet | Romance | | |
| 2 June | Sur Sapata | Mangesh Kanthale | | Sports, Drama | | |
| 9 June | Itemgiri | Pradeep Tonge, Mangesh Shendge | Rajeshwari Kharat, Hansraj Jagtap, Dhanashri Meshram, Manani Durge, Suraj Takke, Shashi Thosar, Chhaya Kadam, Amit Taware & Milind Shinde | Romance, Thriller | | |
| 9 June | Dhondi | Monish Pawar | Sayaji Shinde, Pooja Pawar, Vivek Chabukswar | Drama | | |
| 9 June | Zari | Raju Meshram | Namrata Gaikwad, Milind Shinde, Anant Jog | Drama, Thriller | | |
| 16 June | Tujha Tu Majha Mi | Kuldip Jadhav | Lalit Prabhakar, Neha Mahajan | Romance | | |
| 16 June | Machiwarla Budha | Vijaydatta | Suhas Palshikar, Smita Gondkar | Drama | | |
| 30 June | Andya Cha Funda | Santosh Shetty | Atharva Bedekar, Subham Parab, Mrunal Jadhav | Comedy, Thriller | | |
| 30 June | Ringan | Makarand Mane | Shashank Shende, Sahil Joshi | Drama | | |

== July – September ==
| Opening | Title | Director | Cast | Genre | IMDb | Source |
|---|---|---|---|---|---|---|
| 7 July | Conditions Apply: Ati Lagu | Girish Mohite | Subodh Bhave, Deepti Devi | Romcom | | |
| 7 July | Hrudayantar | Vikram Phadnis | Subodh Bhave, Mukta Barve, Sonali Khare, Manish Paul | Drama | | |
| 14 July | Lapachhapi | Vishal Furia | Pooja Sawant, Usha Naik, Vikram Gaikwad | Horror | | |
| 14 July | Kaay Re Rascala | Giridharan Swamy | Gaurav Ghatnekar, Supriya Pathare | Comedy | | |
| 21 July | Bus Stop | Sameer Joshi | Siddharth Chandekar, Aniket Vishwasrao, Hemant Dhome, Amruta Khanvilkar, Pooja Sawant, Suyog Gorhe, Rasika Sunil, Akshay Waghmare, Madhura Deshpande | Romcom | | |
| 21 July | Manjha | Jatin Wagle | Sumedh Mudgalkar, Rohit Phalke, Ashwini Bhave | Psycho thriller | | |
| 21 July | Ti Ani Itar | Govind Nihalani | Subodh Bhave, Sonali Kulkarni, Amruta Subhash, Ganesh Yadav | Thriller | | |
| 21 July | Toh Ek Awaz - Black Night | Adeeth Bhandarre | Girish Marwadi, Adeeth Bhandarre, Ipsita Priyadarshini, Ankita Chaudhary | Horror | | |
| 28 July | Shentimental | Sameer Patil | Ashok Saraf, Pallavi Patil, Suyog Gorhe | Political Satire | | |
| 28 July | Bhetali Tu Punha | Chandrakant Kanse | Vaibbhav Tatwawdi, Pooja Sawant | Romcom | | |
| 4 August | Bhikari | Ganesh Acharya | Swapnil Joshi, Rucha Inamdar | Thriller | | |
| 4 August | Undga | Vikrant Warde | Chinmay Sant, Swapnil Kanse, Shivani Baokar, Sharvari Gaikwad | Romcom | | |
| 11 August | Kaccha Limbu | Prasad Oak | Ravi Jadhav, Sonali Kulkarni, Manmeet Pem | Comedy, Drama | | |
| 11 August | Mala Kahich Problem Nahi | Sameer Vidhwans | Gashmeer Mahajani, Spruha Joshi | Romcom | | |
| 18 August | Aarti - The Unknown Love Story | Sarika Mene | Roshan Vichare, Ankita Bhoir | Biographical film, Romance | | |
| 1 September | Bandookya | Rahul Chaudhari | Shashank Shende, Namdeo Murkute, Atisha Naik | Thriller | | |
| 8 September | Boyz | Vishal Devrukhkar | Parth Bhalerao, Sumant Shinde, Pratik Lad, Ritika Atul, | Comedy, Drama | | |
| 8 September | Tula Kalnnaar Nahi | Swapna Waghmare Joshi | Subodh Bhave, Sonalee Kulkarni | Drama, Romance | | |
| 15 September | Ubuntu | Pushkar Shrotri | Shashank Shende, Sarang Sathaye, Bhagyashree Shankpal | Drama | | |
| 15 September | Vitthala Shappath | Chandrakant Pawar | Vijay Sairaj, Krutika Gaikwad, Mangesh Desai, Anuradha Rajadhyaksha, Sanjay Khapre, Vidyadhar Joshi, Uday Sabnis | Comedy, Action | | |
| 22 September | Anaan | Rajesh Kushte | Omkar Shinde, Prarthana Behere, Sukhada Khandkekar, Suyog Gohre, Uday Nene, Yatin Karyekar, Shilpa Tulaskar, Uday Sabnis, Veena Jagtap, Rajendra Shisatkar, Sneha Raikar, Prajakta Mali | Drama, Thriller | | |
| 22 September | Nadi Vahate | Sandeep Sawant | Vasant Josalkar, Poonam Shetgaonkar, Asha Shelar | Drama, Social | | |
| 29 September | Baapjanma | Nipun Dharmadhikari | Sachin Khedekar, Pushkraj Chirputkar, Sharvari Lohkare, Akarsh Khurana | Comedy, Drama | | |
| 29 September | Zindagi Virat | Sumit Sanghamitra | Om Bhutkar, Bhalchandra Kadam, Kishor Kadam | Comedy, Drama | | |
| 29 September | Ghuma | Mahesh R. Kale | Sharad Jadhav, Poonam Patil, Adesh Aware, Pramod Kasbe, Teshwani Vetal, Shashank Darne | Drama | | |

== October – December ==
| Opening | Title | Director | Cast | Genre | IMDb | Source |
|---|---|---|---|---|---|---|
| 6 October | Kaasav | Sumitra Bhave, Sunil Sukthankar | Iravati Harshe, Alok Rajwade, Kishor Kadam, Mohan Agashe, Devika Daftardar | Drama, Social | | |
| 6 October | Halal | Shivaji Lotan Patil | Priyadarshan Jadhav, Chinmay Mandlekar, Pritam Kagne, Vijay Chavan, Amol Kagne | Drama, Social | | |
| 6 October | The Silence | Gajendra Ahire | Anjali Patil, Nagraj Manjule, Raghuvir Yadav, Mugdha Chaphekar, Kadambari Kadam, Vedashree Mahajan | Drama | | |
| 6 October | Laden Aala Re Aala | Nazim Rizvi | Azim, Aarti Sapkal | Comedy, Drama | | |
| 6 October | Nirbhaya | Anand Bachhav | Yogita Dandekar, Smita Jaykar, Kishore Mahabole, Aniket kelkar, Abhijit Kulkarni | Drama | | |
| 6 October | Bhavishyachi Aishi Taishi | Shirish Rane, Surinder Verma | Manasi Naik, Ruchita Jadhav, Harshali Zine, Varsha Usgaonkar, Asawari Joshi, Kishor Nandlaskar, Ananda Karekar | Drama, Thriller | | |
| 6 October | Aadesh - Power of Law | Suvahhdan Angre | Suvahhdan Angre, Mukesh Tiwari, Anant Jog, Ashok Shinde, Mithila Naik | Drama | | |
| 13 October | Waakya | Deepak Kadam | Raj Dutta, Ganesh Yadav, Kishori Shahane, Master Panshul Kamod and Priyanka Dnyanlaxmi | Drama | | |
| 13 October | Pramanik Ek Satya Katha | Santosh Ambade | Namrata Jadhav, Kunal Shirole | Drama | | |
| 13 October | Chumbak | Sandeep Modi | Swanand Kirkire | Drama | | |
| 27 October | Faster Fene | Aditya Sarpotdar | Amey Wagh, Parna Pethe | Detective, Thriller | | |
| 3 November | Thank U Vitthala | Devendra Jadhav | Makarand Anaspure, Mahesh Manjrekar, Deepak Shirke, Kamlesh Sawant | Comedy, Drama | | |
| 3 November | Narya | Jalindar Khandagale | Anuj Gurav, Aakanksha Pingale, Mansi Khulpe | Drama | | |
| 10 November | Rangeela Rayaba | Kedar Shinde | Alhad Andore, Radhika Muthukumar | Romcom | | |
| 10 November | Chhand Priticha | N Relekar | Subodh Bhave, Suvarna Kale, Harsh Kulkarni | Drama | | |
| 10 November | Maza Algaar | Milind Kamble | Aishwarya Rajesh, Swapnil Rajshekhar, Yash Kadam, Amol Redij, Archana Joshi, Rucha Apte, Gangadhar Joshi, Prafull Ghag, Rajkiran Dali, Gopal Joshi, Sachin Surve, Nitin Jadhav, Pooja Joshi & Vaidehi Patwardhan | Drama | | |
| 10 November | Huntash | Ankush Thakur | Kishor Nandalskar, Arun Nalawade, Vijay Chavan, Usha Nadkarni | Romcom | | |
| 10 November | Dry Day | Pandurang Jadhav | Ritwikk Kendre, Monalisa Bagal, Parth Ghadage, Ayli Ghiya, Chinmay Kambali, Yogesh Sohoni, Kailash Waghmare, Arun Nalawade | Drama | | |
| 17 November | Dashakriya | Sandeep Patil | Dilip Prabhavalkar, Manoj Joshi, Aditi Deshpande | Drama, Thriller | | |
| 17 November | Hampi | Prakash Kunthe | Sonalee Kulkarni, Lalit Prabhakar, Priyadarshan Jadhav | Romcom | | |
| 24 November | Biscuit | Ravindra Shewale | Shashank Shende, Pooja Nayak, Jayant Savarkar, Ashok Samarth, Devesh Medge | Comedy, Drama | | |
| 24 November | Happy Birthday | Narayan Gondal | Shashank Shende, Arun Nalawade | Drama | | |
| 15 December | Ghaat | Raj Gorde | Yash Kulkarni, Dattatray Dharme, Mitali Jagtap, Umesh Jagtap, Riya Gavli | Drama | | |
| 15 December | Chalu Dya Tumcha | Rajesh Jadhav | Milind Gunaji, Vijay Kadam, Vijay Patkar, Umesh Mitkari, Megha Gadge, Swapnil Borkar | Comedy | | |
| 15 December | Rang He Premache Rangeele | Kiran Harchande | Kunal Devalkar, Siddhi Dalvi | Drama, Romance | | |
| 22 December | Deva | Murali Nallappa | Ankush Chaudhari, Tejaswini Pandit, Spruha Joshi | Drama, Thriller | | |
| 22 December | Gachchi | Nachiket Samant | Priya Bapat, Abhay Mahajan | Romcom | | |
