= 4th Filmfare Awards Marathi =

Indian film awards

4th Filmfare Marathi Awards
- Presented on: 27 September 2018
- Site: Bombay Convention & Exhibition Centre, Mumbai
- Hosted by: Amey Wagh, Suvrat Joshi
- Organized by: Jio

Highlights
- Best Film: Kachcha Limboo
- Best Critic: Halal
- Most awards: Muramba (6)
- Most nominations: Muramba (15)

The 4th Filmfare Marathi Awards is a ceremony, presented by Jio, honored the best Indian Marathi-language films of 2017.

Muramba led the ceremony with 15 nominations, followed by Ringan with 14 nominations, Hrudayantar with 12 nominations, and Ti Saddhya Kay Karte with 11 nominations.

Muramba won 6 awards, including Best Actor, Best Supporting Actress, Best Female Debut and Best Debut Director, followed by Ringan with 5 awards, and Kachcha Limbo and Faster Fene with 4 awards each.

Prasad Oak received dual nominations for Best Director and Best Debut Director for Kachcha Limbo, winning for the former.

== Ceremony ==
It was held on 27 September 2018 at Bombay Convention & Exhibition Centre, Goregaon, the 4th Filmfare Marathi Awards honored the films released in 2017. At a press conference helmed by editor of Filmfare magazine, Jio was revealed as the title sponsor. Actors Amey Wagh and Suvrat Joshi were announced as the co-hosts, while singers Bela Shende, Swapnil Bandodkar, and actors Prajakta Mali, Vaidehi Parashurami and Amruta Khanvilkar performed during the event. Bollywood actors Bhumi Pednekar, Kartik Aaryan and Urmila Matondkar were also present at the event.

== Winners and nominees ==
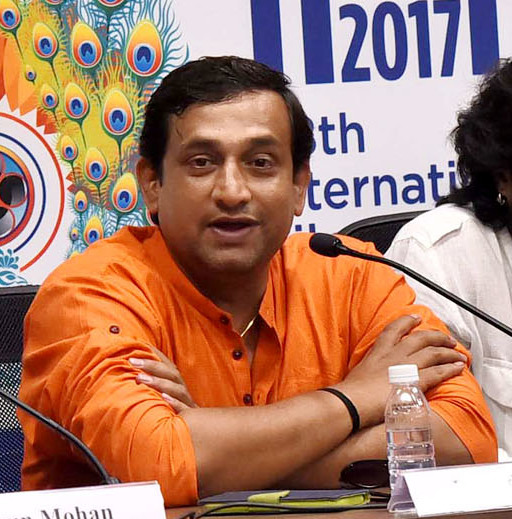
Prasad Oak – Best Director

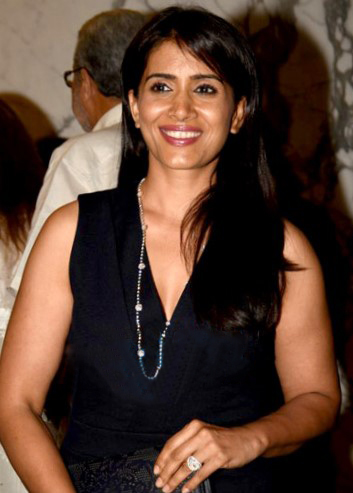
Sonali Kulkarni – Best Actress

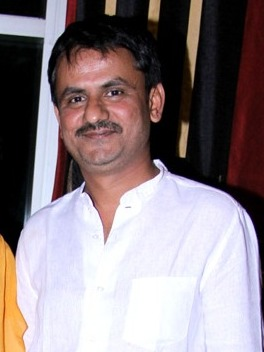
Girish Kulkarni – Best Supporting Actor

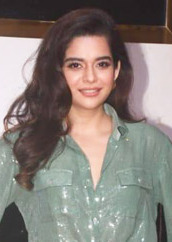
Mithila Palkar – Best Female Debut

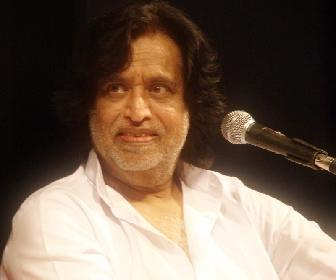
Hridaynath Mangeshkar – Lifetime Achievement Award

Best Film	Best Director
Kachcha Limboo; Faster Fene; Ti Saddhya Kay Karte; Lapachhapi; Muramba; Hrudayantar	Prasad Oak – Kachcha Limboo; Aditya Sarpotdar – Faster Fene; Satish Rajwade – Ti Saddhya Kay Karte; Vishal Furia – Lapachhapi; Vikram Phadnis – Hrudayantar; Varun Narvekar – Muramba
Best Actor	Best Actress
Amey Wagh – Muramba as Alok; Ashok Saraf– Shentimental as PSI Pralhad Ghodke; Sachin Khedekar– Baapjanma as Bhaskar Pandit; Subodh Bhave – Hrudayantar as Shekhar Joshi; Sumedh Mudgalkar – Manjha as Vikram (Vicky)	Sonali Kulkarni – Kachcha Limboo as Shaila Katdare; Mrinmayee Godbole – Chi Va Chi Sau Ka as Savitri Kulkarni; Priya Bapat – Gachchi as Keerti; Sonalee Kulkarni– Hampi as Isha; Mukta Barve – Hrudayantar as Samaira Joshi; Pooja Sawant - Lapachhapi as Neha
Best Supporting Actor	Best Supporting Actress
Girish Kulkarni – Faster Fene as Appa; Aniket Vishwasrao – Baghtos Kay Mujra Kar as Pandurang Shinde; Chinmay Mandlekar – Halal as Maulana; Manoj Joshi – Dashakriya as Keshav Bhatji; Rohit Phalke – Manjha as Jaideep; Upendra Limaye – Shentimental as API Dilip Thakur	Chinmayee Sumeet – Muramba as Alok's Mother; Jyoti Subhash– Chi Va Chi Sau Ka as Aaji; Kranti Redkar – Karaar as Radha; Parna Pethe – Faster Fene as Aboli; Usha Naik – Lapachhapi as Tulsabai; Kalyani Muley – Ringan as Manjhi
Best Male Debut	Best Female Debut
Abhinay Berde – Ti Saddhya Kay Karte as young Anurag; Ravi Jadhav – Kachcha Limbo as Mohan Katdare; Sangram Samel – Brave Heart as Nikhil Kharkhanis	Mithila Palkar – Muramba as Indu; Aarya Ambekar – Ti Saddhya Kay Karte as young Tanvi; Pritam Kagne – Halal as Halim
Best Music Director	Best Lyricist
Nilesh Moharir, Mandar Apte, Avinash-Vishwajeet – Ti Saddhya Kay Karte; AV Prafulchandra – Zala Bobhata; Avadhoot Gupte – Boyz; Chinar-Mahesh, Vivek Deulkar – Bhetali Tu Punha; Nilesh Moharir, Amitraj – Tula Kalnnaar Nahi; Praful Karlekar – Hrudayantar	Sandeep Khare – "Maze Aai Baba" – Kachcha Limbo; Dasu Vaidya – "Vithalla" – Ringan; Sanjay Jamkhandi – "Bhetali Tu Punha" – Bhetali Tu Punha; Sayed Akhtar, Subodh Pawar – "Maula Mere Maula" – Halal; Vaibhav Deshmukh – "Dev Pahila" – Ringan; Vaibhav Joshi – "Muramba" – Muramba
Best Playback Singer – Male	Best Playback Singer – Female
Adarsh Shinde – "Vitthala" – Ringan; Ajay Gogavale – "Dev Pahila" – Ringan; Hrishikesh Ranade – "Jara Jara" – Ti Saddhya Kay Karte; Jasraj Joshi – "Muramba" – Muramba; Nikhil Modgi – "Bhetali Tu Punha" – Bhetali Tu Punha; Swapnil Bandodkar – "Vate Vari" – Hrudayantar	Anuradha Kuber – "Maze Tuze" – Muramba; Anandi Joshi – "Vate Vari" – Hrudayantar; Anuradha Kuber – "Maze Tuze" – Muramba; Aarya Ambekar – "Jara Jara" – Ti Saddhya Kay Karte; Rupali Moghe – "Marugelara O Raghava" – Hampi; Neha Rajpal – "Tula Kalnnaar Nahi" – Tula Kalnnaar Nahi

Critics' awards

Best Film
Halal – Shivaji Patil; Kaasav – Sumitra Bhave-Sunil Sukhtankar; Ringan – Makarand Mane; Nadi Vahate – Sandeep Sawant; Manjha – Jatin Wagle
Best Actor	Best Actress
Shashank Shende – Ringan as Arjun Magar; Priyadarshan Jadhav – Halal as Kaddus; Alok Rajwade – Kaasav as Maanav; Ravi Jadhav – Kachcha Limbo as Mohan Katdare; Sumedh Mudgalkar – Manjha as Vikram (Vicky)	Iravati Harshe – Kaasav as Janaki; Pritam Kagne – Halal as Halim; Sonali Kulkarni – Kachcha Limbo as Shaila Katdare; Ashwini Bhave – Manjha as Samidha

Technical Awards

Best Story	Best Screenplay
Makarand Mane – Ringan; Nipun Dharmadhikari – Baapjanma; Rajan Khan – Halal; Vishal Furia – Lapachhapi; Vikram Phadnis – Hrudayantar; Varun Narvekar – Muramba	Kshitij Patwardhan – Faster Fene; Jatin Wagle – Manjha; Manaswini Lata Ravindra – Ti Saddhya Kay Karte; Vikram Phadnis, Saurabh Bhave – Hrudayantar; Varun Narvekar – Muramba
Best Dialogue	Best Editing
Varun Narvekar – Muramba; Madhugandha Kulkarni, Paresh Mokashi – Chi Va Chi Sau Ka; Makarand Mane – Ringan; Nishant Natharam Dhapse – Halal; Sameer Patil – Shentimental; Manaswini Lata Ravindra – Ti Saddhya Kay Karte	Faizal-Imran – Faster Fene; Faizal-Imran – Baghtos Kay Mujra Kar; Dinesh Poojari – Lapachhapi; Jayant Jathar – Shentimental; Charu Shree Roy – Manjha
Best Choreography	Best Cinematography
Phulwa Khamkar – "Apne Hi Rang Main" – Hampi; Rahul-Sanjeev – "Deva Ho Deva" – Bhikari; Ganesh Acharya – "Kutha Kutha" – Boyz; Sujit Kumar – "Janu Janu" – Bhetali Tu Punha; Sujit Kumar – "Lagnalu" – Boyz; Vrushali Chavan – "Parikatha " – Ti Saddhya Kay Karte	Amalendu Chaudhary – Hampi; Amalendu Chaudhary – Kachcha Limboo; Abhijit Abde – Ringan; Dhananjay Kulkarni – Kaasav; Milind Jog – Faster Fene; Milind Jog – Muramba
Best Production Design	Best Sound Design
Nikhil Kovale – Faster Fene; Asit Kumar Chhatui, Kuldeep Sharma – Hrudayantar; Santosh Phutane – Kachcha Limboo; Siddharth Tatooskar – Muramba	Baylon Fonseca – Manjha; Anmol Bhave – Kaasav; Kiran Dudwadkar, Rupesh Mayekar – Lapachhapi; Manoj Mochemadkar – Gachchi; Mahavir Sabbanwar – Ringan
Best Background Score	Best Costume Design
Utkarsh Dhotekar, Ranjan Pattnayak, Tony Basumatary – Lapachhapi; Aditya Bedekar – Hampi; Anurag Saikia – Manjha; Gandhaar – Ringan; Saket Kanetkar – Kaasav	Vikram Phadnis – Hrudayantar; Nakshatra Dewadikar – Manjha; Pallavi Rajwade – Ti Saddhya Kay Karte; Sayli Soman – Hampi

Special awards

Lifetime Achievement Award
- Hridaynath Mangeshkar
Best Debut Director
- Varun Narvekar – Muramba
- Makarand Mane – Ringan
  - Prasad Oak – Kachcha Limboo
  - Pushkar Shrotri – Ubuntu
  - Vishal Furia – Lapachhapi
  - Vikram Phadnis – Hrudayantar
Best Child Artist
- Sahil Joshi – Ringan as Abhimanyu Arjun Magar

== Superlatives ==
Multiple nominations
Nominations	Film
15	Muramba
14	Ringan
12	Hrudayantar
11	Ti Saddhya Kay Karte
10	Kachcha Limbo
10	Manjha
9	Lapachhapi
8	Faster Fene
8	Halal
6	Hampi
6	Kaasav
4	Shentimental
4	Bhetali Tu Punha
3	Chi Va Chi Sau Ka
3	Boyz

Multiple wins
Awards	Film
6	Muramba
5	Ringan
4	Kachcha Limbo
4	Faster Fene
2	Ti Saddhya Kay Karte
2	Hampi
