= Ram Kondilkar =

Indian film publicist

- Born: 06-01-1976; Karjat
- Occupation: Publicist
- Years active: 1996 -till
- Spouse: Tejashree Ram Kondilkar
- Children: Gargee Ram Kondilkar

Ram Kondilkar is a Marathi publicist based in Mumbai, India. He specializes in plays, television, and feature film publicity. He has represented actors Girish Pandurang Kulkarni, Ashok Samarth, Anshuman Vichare, Milind Gawali, Ajinkya Deo, Directors Sanjay Surkar, Sumitra Bhave, Sunil Sukhtankar, Chandrakant Kulkarni, Gajendra Ahire, Rajiv Patil, Umesh Vinayak Kulkarni, Kedar Shinde, Aditya Sarpotdar, Jayprad Desai, Satish Manvar, Nikhil Mahajan, Kiran Yadnyopavit, Sachin Kundalkar, Shivaji Lotan Patil, and others. He has also represented musicians such as Pt. Jasraj, Ratan Mohan Sharma, Tripti Mukharjee, and Gaurav Bangia. He has publicized more than 125 films.

== Life and career ==
Ram Kondilkar was born in 1976 at Karjat, near Mumbai, India, and was raised in Mumbai.

Ram Kondilkar first worked in air conditioning repair. He joined film publicist Nilay Vaidya to assist him on various projects early in his entertainment career. He handled Marathi films and music as well as regional popular dramas, personalities, and celebrity profiles. In 2010, he was part of the re-launch of the Mi Marathi television channel of HDIL Business Group, followed by the SaamTv Marathi Channel of Sakal Publication House.

He has worked closely with director Kedar Shinde among several others. He has also been executive producer for Khandobachya Navane and Sail films. He produced the album Gandh Gaarva, which received positive reviews among fans.

Ram kondilkar became known in the Marathi film industry for such films as Sawarkhed Ek Gaon and Laxmikant Berde’s Last Lele Virudh Lele.

== Ram Publicity ==
He founded Ram Publicity in 2002, specializing in Marathi entertainment. Ram Kondilkar does corporate publicity for some of India's leading entertainment production houses like Balaji telefilms, AB Corp, I Dream Productions, Shemaroo Entertainment, and Mukta Arts, as well as public sector companies and other non-government organizations.

== Filmography ==
| Year | Title | Role | Language | Notes |
|---|---|---|---|---|
| 2001 | Bhet | Publicist | Marathi | |
| 2002 | Not Only Mrs. Raut | Publicist | Marathi | |
| 2003 | Savarkhed Ek Gaon | Publicist | Marathi | |
| 2003 | Vitthal Vitthal | Publicist | Marathi | |
| 2004 | Pandhar | Publicist | Marathi | |
| 2004 | Saatchya Aat Gharat | Publicist | Marathi | |
| 2005 | Vaah! Life Ho Toh Aisi! | Publicist | Marathi | |
| 2005 | Housefull | Publicist | Marathi | |
| 2005 | Khandobachya Navana | Executive Producer & Publicist | Marathi | |
| 2005 | Yanda Kartve Ahe | Publicist | Marathi | |
| 2006 | Majha Navara Tujhi Bayko | Publicist | Marathi | |
| 2006 | Sail | Executive Producer & Publicist | Marathi | |
| 2006 | Shevri | Publicist | Marathi | |
| 2006 | Anandache Jhaad | Publicist | Marathi | |
| 2006 | Restaurant | Publicist | Marathi | |
| 2006 | Kaydyacha Bola | Publicist | Marathi | |
| 2007 | Maai Baap | Publicist | Marathi | |
| 2007 | Sarivar Sari | Publicist | Marathi | |
| 2007 | Aawahan | Publicist | Marathi | |
| 2007 | Bandh Premache | Publicist | Marathi | |
| 2007 | Gojiri | Publicist | Marathi | |
| 2007 | Mukkam Post London | Publicist | Marathi | |
| 2007 | Bakula Namdev Ghotale | Publicist | Marathi | |
| 2008 | Foreignchi Patlin | Publicist | Marathi | |
| 2008 | Aai Shappat..! | Publicist | Marathi | |
| 2008 | Jogwa | Publicist | Marathi | |
| 2008 | Dhudgus | Publicist | Marathi | |
| 2008 | Ara Ara Aaba Aata Tari Thamba | Publicist | Marathi | |
| 2009 | Mumbaicha Dabewala | Publicist | Marathi | |
| 2009 | Aadla Badli | Publicist | Marathi | |
| 2009 | Valu | Publicist | Marathi | |
| 2009 | Checkmate | Publicist | Marathi | |
| 2009 | Taryanche Bait | Publicist | Marathi | |
| 2009 | Gandha | Publicist | Marathi | |
| 2009 | Jhing Chik Jhing | Publicist | Marathi | |
| 2009 | Made in China | Publicist | Marathi | |
| 2009 | The Damned Rain (Gabhricha Paus) | Publicist | Marathi | |
| 2009 | Rangiberangi | Publicist | Marathi | |
| 2010 | Chintoo | Publicist | Marathi | |
| 2010 | Vihir | Publicist | Marathi | |
| 2010 | Tee Ratra | Publicist | Marathi | |
| 2010 | Vavtal | Publicist | Marathi | |
| 2010 | Jetaa | Publicist | Marathi | |
| 2011 | Stand By | Publicist | Marathi | |
| 2011 | Pangira | Publicist | Marathi | |
| 2011 | Platform | Publicist | Marathi | |
| 2011 | Paulwaat | Publicist | Marathi | |
| 2011 | Superstar | Publicist | Marathi | |
| 2011 | Sanai Choughade | Publicist | Marathi | |
| 2011 | Khel Mandala | Publicist | Marathi | |
| 2011 | Deool | Publicist | Marathi | |
| 2012 | Ya Gol Gol Dabyatla | Publicist | Marathi | |
| 2012 | Laathi | Publicist | Marathi | |
| 2012 | Narbachi Wadi | Publicist | Marathi | |
| 2012 | Masala | Publicist | Marathi | |
| 2012 | Bharatiya | Publicist | Marathi | |
| 2013 | Kho-Kho | Publicist | Marathi | |
| 2013 | Shrimant Damodar Pant | Publicist | Marathi | |
| 2013 | Samhita | Publicist | Marathi | |
| 2013 | Tendulkar Out | Publicist | Marathi | |
| 2013 | Pune 52 | Publicist | Marathi | |
| 2014 | Dhag | Publicist | Marathi | |
| 2014 | Aamhi Bolato Marathi | Publicist | Marathi | |
| 2014 | Zentalman | Publicist | Marathi | |
| 2015 | Court | Publicist | Marathi | |
| 2015 | Nagrik | Publicist | Marathi | |
| 2015 | Highway | Publicist | Marathi | |
| 2015 | Khwada | Publicist | Marathi | |
| 2015 | Shalee | Publicist | Marathi | |
| 2015 | Chaandi | Publicist | Marathi | |
| 2016 | Bernie | Publicist | Marathi | |
| 2016 | Athang | Publicist | Marathi | |
| 2016 | Ganavesh | Publicist | Marathi | |
| 2016 | A Dot Com Mom | Creative head | Marathi | |
| 2017 | Dashakriya | Executive Producer & Publicist | Marathi | |
| 2019 | Readymix | Publicist | Marathi | |
| 2019 | Bandishala | Executive Producer & Publicist | Marathi | |
| 2021 | Avwanchhit | Publicist | Marathi | |
| 2021 | Picasso | Publicist | Marathi | |
| 2021 | Mai Ghat: Crime No 103/2005 | Publicist | Marathi | |
| 2022 | Varhadi Vajantri | Publicist | Marathi | |
| 2023 | Bunny | Publicist | Marathi | |
| 2023 | Morrya | Publicist | Marathi | |
| 2023 | Chhapa Kaata | Publicist | Marathi | |
| 2023 | Dhh Lekacha | Publicist | Marathi | |
| 2023 | Bol Hari Bol | Publicist | Marathi | |
| 2023 | Hira Pheri | Publicist | Marathi | |
| 2024 | Lokshahi | Publicist | Marathi | |
| 2024 | Janma Runna | Publicist | Marathi | |
| 2024 | Ghaath | Publicist | Marathi | |
| 2025 | Mission Ayodhya | Publicist | Marathi | |
| 2026 | Toh, Ti ani Fuji | Publicist | Marathi | |
| 2026 | Kirtan | Publicist | Marathi | |
