= Sachdev =

Indian surname

Sachdev is a Hindu and Sikh Arora surname.

== Origin ==
That is originated from Sanskrit Satya 'true' + deva 'god, lord'.

== Notables ==
Notable people with the surname include:

- Achala Sachdev (1920–2012), Indian film actress
- Asha Sachdev (born 1956), Indian film actress
- Avinash Sachdev (born 1986), Indian television actor
- Gireesh Sahdev, Indian television actor
- G. S. Sachdev (1935–2018), Indian bansuri performer
- Kiran Bala Sachdev, stage name Tabassum (1944–2022), Indian actress
- Kunwer Sachdev (born 1962), Indian entrepreneur
- Mahipal S. Sachdev, Indian ophthalmologist
- Manoj Sachdev, Canadian engineer
- M. R. Sachdev (1903–1964), Indian civil servant
- Padma Sachdev (1940–2021), Indian poet and novelist
- Perminder Sachdev (born 1956), Indian neuropsychiatrist
- Piyush Sahdev, Indian television actor
- Pranav Sachdev, Indian actor
- Prashant Raj Sachdev (born 1984), Indian actor and model
- Rajeshwari Sachdev (born 1975), Indian film actress and singer
- Sai Sachdev (born 2005), English football player
- Shashwat Sachdev, Indian composer
- Shivshakti Sachdev (born 1993), Indian television actress
- Sonali Sachdev, Indian actress
- Subir Sachdev (born 1961), physics professor
- Sumeet Sachdev (born 1975/76), Indian actor
- Tania Sachdev (born 1986), Indian chess player
- Taruni Sachdev (1998–2012), Indian actress

== See also ==
- Sachdeva
