= Kon Yashwant Pansare? =

Indian crime thriller series

- Kon Yashwant Pansare?
- Genre: Courtroom Drama; Thriller
- Written by: Anand Dilip Gokhale; Niranjan Parandkar
- Directed by: Anand Dilip Gokhale
- Starring: Bharat Jadhav; Shivani Rangole; Sharvari Jamenis; Ujwala Jog; Pushkar Shrotri; Milind Phatak
- Country of origin: India
- Original language: Marathi
- No. of episodes: 7

Production
- Producer: Manjiri Subodh Bhave

Original release
- Network: ZEE5

Kon Yashwant Pansare? is a 2026 Indian Marathi-language courtroom drama crime thriller series scheduled to premiered on ZEE5 on 16 October 2026. It is directed by Anand Dilip Gokhale and features Bharat Jadhav as the protagonist. Other members of the cast include Shivani Rangole, Sharvari Jamenis, Ujwala Jog and Pushkar Shrotri.

The show is an official remake of successful Tamil series Sattamum Neethiyum.

== Synopsis ==
Yashwant Pansare, a once-dedicated lawyer, loses his faith in the legal system and abandons his law practice. However, a sudden, suspicious death forces him out of retirement, awakening his forgotten drive for truth and pushing him back into court to fight for justice.

This is the time Bharat Jadhav is seen in the role of a lawyer.

== Cast ==
- Bharat Jadhav as Advocate Yashwant Pansare – A formerly idealistic defense attorney reduced to working as a notary who returns to active legal practice after a personal tragedy.
- Pushkar Shrotri as Advocate Sarada – A formidable public prosecutor who serves as Pansare's primary antagonist inside the courtroom.
- Shivani Rangole as Janhavi – A fearless, unconventional young attorney who joins forces with Pansare to help him investigate the case.
- Sharvari Jamenis as Ranjana Pansare – Yashwant Pansare's supportive wife.
- Ujwala Jog as Pansare's mother-in-law.
- Vidyadhar Joshi as Pramod Jagdale - MLA of Saswad
- Milind Phatak as Sadashiv Mapari – An elderly father who sets himself on fire outside the court after the authorities fail to investigate his daughter Alka's disappearance, driving Pansare out of retirement.
- Pallavi Ajay

== Episodes ==
No. overall	No. in season	Title	Directed by	Written by	Original release date
1	1	"Forgive Me"	Anand Dilip Gokhale	Anand Dilip Gokhale & Niranjan Parandkar	October 16, 2026
Following the tragic death of Sadashiv Mapari, a guilt-ridden Yashwant Pansare decides to end his self-imposed retirement. Motivated by personal remorse, he resolves to step back into the legal arena to fight for justice on behalf of the victim.
2	2	"The Beginning of the End"	Anand Dilip Gokhale	Anand Dilip Gokhale & Niranjan Parandkar	October 16, 2026
Pansare officially initiates his return to the courtroom, navigating initial systemic hurdles. He lays down the strategic foundation for the upcoming trial, signaling the start of a intense legal battle against corrupt institutions.
3	3	"The Chase"	Anand Dilip Gokhale	Anand Dilip Gokhale & Niranjan Parandkar	October 16, 2026
Pansare and his legal team uncover a critical lead regarding the whereabouts of a missing girl. However, their momentum faces a major setback when Sandeep dies under sudden and mysterious circumstances, throwing the investigation into disarray.
4	4	"The Delusion"	Anand Dilip Gokhale	Anand Dilip Gokhale & Niranjan Parandkar	October 16, 2026
Advancing further down the investigative trail, Pansare uncovers key clues connected to Alka. Just as a breakthrough seems within reach, a dying witness leads the case down a complex dead end, stalling their progress.
5	5	"Tit for Tat"	Anand Dilip Gokhale	Anand Dilip Gokhale & Niranjan Parandkar	October 16, 2026
While Pansare manages to unearths a crucial, dark lead regarding Alka, his progress is undermined inside the courtroom. The formidable prosecutor, Advocate Sarada, pulls off a calculated legal maneuver that successfully turns the case against Pansare.
6	6	"Race Against Time"	Anand Dilip Gokhale	Anand Dilip Gokhale & Niranjan Parandkar	October 16, 2026
Bound by a strict deadline imposed by the court, Pansare races against the clock to track down Alka. Meanwhile, powerful external forces mobilize against him, leaving him entirely unaware of the physical danger closing in.
7	7	"Me.. Yashwant Pansare"	Anand Dilip Gokhale	Anand Dilip Gokhale & Niranjan Parandkar	October 16, 2026
With all legal avenues seemingly exhausted and the case on the verge of collapse, Pansare arrives for the final court session. He introduces a surprise witness whose presence dramatically alters the trajectory of the trial and exposes the final truth.

== Reception ==
Much of the commentary on the series revolves around Bharat Jadhav's performance as Yashwant Pansare. News18 Marathi wrote, "The biggest highlight of this series on ZEE5 is Bharat Jadhav's portrayal of Yashwant Pansare." Masala Manoranjan rated the series 3 out of 5 and wrote, "The story keeps the audience engaged enough to watch it in one sitting." FilmiBeat rated it 3.5 out of 5 and states, "The narrative explores institutional apathy, political influence and the challenges faced by ordinary citizens seeking justice, giving the courtroom proceedings a larger social context.

== See also ==
- Sattamum Neethiyum
