= Sachdeva =

Sachdeva is a Punjabi surname used by Hindus and Sikhs of the Arora community, derived from the Sanskrit words Satya 'true' + deva 'god, lord'.

Notable people with the surname include:

- Akhil Sachdeva, Indian musician, singer and composer
- Anuj Sachdeva (born 1986), Indian actor and model
- Ashok Masti, stage name of Ashok Sachdeva, Indian playback singer
- Atul Sachdeva (born 1980), English cricketer
- Harry Sachdeva (born 1977), Indian businessman and film director
- Moulshree Sachdeva, Indian film and television actress
- Rachna Sachdeva Korhonen, American diplomat
- Sanjeev Sachdeva (born 1964), Indian judge
- Saurabh Sachdeva, Indian actor and acting coach
- Som Nath Sachdeva, Indian professor, civil engineer and university administrator
- Subhash Sachdeva (born 1956), Indian politician, leader of Bharatiya Janata Party
- Yogesh Sachdeva (born 1982), Indian cricketer

== See also ==
- Old Sachdeva railway station, Patna district, Bihar
- Murder of Aditya Sachdeva, 2016 murder of a college student in Patna, Bihar
- Sachdeva Institute of Technology, educational institute in India
