= Harry Sachdeva =

Indian film director (born 1977)

- Born: Harpreet Sachdeva; 17 November 1977 (age 48); Delhi, India
- Education: Delhi University
- Known for: Working with International Brands
- Notable work: Launched Hell Energy in India, Got San Miguel Of Spain into India, 31st October (Film)
- Website: https://nysaluxuryhomes.com/index.html

Harry Sachdeva (born 17 November 1977) is an Indian businessman and works in the film industry as a writer, director and film-producer.

== Early life ==
Sachdeva was born on 17 November 1977 in Delhi. He studied Chemistry Honors from Delhi University and completed his MBA also from Fore School of Management.

== Work ==
Prior to his entry into the film industry, Sachdeva worked in the import and distribution industry and helped introduce international brands to the Indian market, such as San Miguel, Krombacher, Kafer, Andes, Hell Energy. Currently, Sachdeva heads several companies, including Magical Dreams Productions, Hotel Goodtimes, Gr8 Future Brands, Allied Spirits, Montage Distillery, and Jes & Ben Groupo.

In August 2016, Sachdeva established Jes & Ben Groupo. The company has also brought the third most sold, Hell Energy Drink, to India and has sold over 10 million cans.

In the real estate industry, Sachdeva completed projects in Delhi, Gurgaon, Rajasthan. He is the founder and CEO of Nysa Luxury Infra, a luxury living company. Sachdeva is set to launch premium villas under his company in Goa.

== Film career ==
Sachdeva made his debut with the film "31st October." The movie, released on 21 October 2016, depicts the true story of a family's survival during the 1984 anti-Sikh riots. It features actors Soha Ali Khan and Vir Das in lead roles and was well received at various international film festivals, including the London International Film Festival, Toronto International Film Festival, and Sikhhi International Film Festival.

Sachdeva worked with renowned industry professionals, such as Shivaji Lotan Patil, Ramani Ranjan Das.

== Filmography ==
| Title | Release dates | Language | Status | | |
|---|---|---|---|---|---|
| 31st October | 21 October 2016 | Hindi | Released | 2023| Hindi | Pre-Production |
| I-Witness | 2023 | March Past | 2024 | Hindi English | Pre-Production |
