= Carry On Deshpande =

- Directed by: Vijay Patkar
- Starring: Pushkar Shrotri; Hemlata Bane; Sagar Karande; Sanjay Khapre; Manasi Naik
- Cinematography: Shabbir Naik
- Edited by: Satish Patil
- Music by: Chinar–Mahesh
- Release date: 11 December 2015
- Country: India
- Language: Marathi

Carry On Deshpande is an Indian, Marathi-language film directed by Vijay Patkar. The film, released on 11 December 2015, stars Pushkar Shrotri, Hemlata Bane, Sagar Karande, Sanjay Khapre and Manasi Naik, with music by Chinar–Mahesh.

== Synopsis ==
The film centres on casanove Shashi Deshpande and his two wives, who are suspicious of his activities. Conflict arises when he meets a third love interest, Mallika.

== Cast ==
- Pushkar Shrotri as Shashi Deshpande
- Manasi Naik as Mallika (pole dancer)
- Sagar Karande as Detective
- Seema Kadam as Prathama Deshpande
- Hemlata Bane as Dwitiya Deshpande
- Sanjay Khapre as Sunny
- Snehal Gore
- Jaywant Wadkar
- Vijay Kadam
- Savita Malpekar
- Jayraj Nair
- Ankur

== Soundtrack ==
Carry On Deshpande

Soundtrack album by Chinar–Mahesh
- Released: 2015
- Recorded: 2015
- Genre: Feature film soundtrack
- Length: 13:32
- Language: Marathi

Official audio
- Well Carry On Deshpande – Full Album on YouTube

Track listing
No.	Title	Singer(s)	Length
1.	"Carry on Deshpande"	Chinar Kharkar, Crystal Sequeira	3:54
2.	"Naughty Girl"	Shalmali Kholgade	3:36
3.	"Baan Gulabi Gulabi"	Rishikesh Kamekar	3:04
4.	"Lagnoba"	Kirti Kelledar, Rishikesh Kamekar, Savani Ravindra	3:38
Total length:			13:32

== Critical reception ==
Carry On Deshpande received negative reviews from critics.

Mihir Bhanage of The Times of India gave the film 2 stars out of 5, writing "it has been made with a particular set of audience in mind and perhaps would also strike a chord with item-song enthusiasts".

Ganesh Matkari of Pune Mirror remarked that "just like we invented the new serious Marathi cinema, maybe it’s time to evolve a new comedy — something that pleases all, but which won’t be a rehash of the tired old routines".

Soumitra Pote of Maharashtra Times gave the film 2 stars out of 5, stating "the movie starts with the song 'Mai Hoon Naughty Naughty Girl..' This song is catchy. Mansi Naik has done it with his dancing skills. There is only so much to notice in this movie".

Chaitali Gaurav of Loksatta wrote that "this story could have been presented in a better way, almost like a farce. But watching the movie, it feels like everything is planned by deciding to show only apathy".
