= Banjara (2025 film) =

Indian Marathi-language adventure drama film

- First look poster
- Directed by: Sneh Ponkshe
- Written by: Sneh Ponkshe
- Produced by: Rohini Vijaysingh Patwardhan; Sharad Ponkshe
- Starring: Bharat Jadhav; Sharad Ponkshe; Sunil Barve; Saksham Kulkarni; Sneh Ponkshe; Aditya Dhanraj
- Cinematography: Gaurav Ponkshe
- Edited by: Gaurav Rai
- Music by: Music: Avadhoot Gupte; Score: Avadhoot Gupte; Anurag Godbole
- Production companies: V. S. Productions; Morya Productions
- Distributed by: Panorama Studios
- Release date: 16 May 2025
- Country: India
- Language: Marathi

Banjara (transl. Wanderers) is a 2025 Indian Marathi-language buddy adventure drama film written and directed by Sneh Ponkshe, marking his directorial debut. The film is produced by his father, Sharad Ponkshe, marking his debut as a producer, along with Rohini Vijaysingh Patwardhan under the banners of V. S. Productions and Morya Productions. It stars Sharad Ponkshe, Bharat Jadhav, Sunil Barve, Saksham Kulkarni, Sneh Ponkshe, and Aditya Dhanraj in prominent roles.

Banjara is the first Indian film to be shot at an altitude 14,800 feet. The film was released on 16 May 2025 in theatres.

== Plot ==
The film introduces a diverse group of friends and acquaintances, each carrying personal struggles and ambitions. Their decision to travel together sets the stage for a journey filled with humor, conflict, and reflection. he road trip becomes more than just travel—it’s a metaphor for life’s unpredictability. Along the way, the group encounters challenges that force them to confront their past choices, cultural differences, and generational gaps.

== Cast ==
- Sharad Ponkshe as Avinash
  - Sneh Ponkshe as young Avinash
- Bharat Jadhav as Sameer
  - Saksham Kulkarni as young Sameer
- Sunil Barve as Vivek
  - Aditya Dhanraj as young Vivek
- Frankie J. Mitchell as Amanda
- Sanjay Mone as Aghori Baba

== Production ==
=== Development ===
In late June 2024, Sharad Ponkshe unveiled a brief glimpse of the project, marking his debut as a film producer alongside his son Sneh Ponkshe's directorial debut. The official poster was unveiled during a special launch event at Plaza Cinema in Dadar in mid-October 2024, with Mahesh Manjrekar attending as a guest. Speaking at the event, Sharad Ponkshe shared, "This journey reflects the essence of everyone's life. Sneh has treated the subject with great sensitivity. The story of these three friends promises to be a thought-provoking experience for the audience."

=== Casting ===
Sharad Ponkshe, Bharat Jadhav, and Sunil Barve take on the lead roles as the trio of friends. Saksham Kulkarni, Sneh Barve, and Aditya Dhanraj portrayed young version of trio.

=== Filming ===
A significant portion of the film was shot in Sikkim, marking it as the first Marathi film to be filmed in the state. Some sequences was filmed at an altitude of approximately 14,800 feet, making it the first Indian film to shoot at such a height. Due to the low oxygen levels, the crew used oxygen spray, the shooting schedule spanned nine days and involved a team of 150 crew members, with over 100 local residents also participating in the production.

== Soundtrack ==
=== Track listing ===
No.	Title	Lyrics	Singer(s)	Length
1.	"Houya Recharge"	Guru Thakur	Shaan, Avadhoot Gupte	2:54
2.	"C'mon Lets Dance"	Guru Thakur	Sonu Nigam	04:12
3.	"Banjara Title Track"	Guru Thakur	Vishal Dadlani	05:01
4.	"Om Namah Shivay"	Guru Thakur	Avadhoot Gupte	4:23
5.	"Jarase Thambun Maage Pahave"	Guru Thakur	Shaan and Avadhoot Gupte	02:06
Total length:				19:37

== Release ==
The film was theatrically released on 16 May 2025. It was originally planned for release on 25 December 2024 to coincide with Christmas.
