= Dholkichya Talavar =

- Genre: Reality television
- Based on: Lavani
- Developed by: Vipul Mehta
- Written by: Chinmay Kulkarni
- Directed by: Santosh Kolhe
- Presented by: Subodh Bhave; Hemant Dhome; Adarsh Shinde; Nandesh Umap; Akshay Kelkar
- Judges: Vishwas Patil; Manasi Naik; Dipali Sayyad; Shakuntala Nagarkar; Jitendra Joshi; Phulwa Khamkar; Kranti Redkar; Ashish Patil; Abhijeet Panse
- Country of origin: India
- Original language: Marathi
- No. of seasons: 6
- No. of episodes: 154

Production
- Cinematography: Sukhvinder Singh Chauhan
- Camera setup: Multi-camera
- Running time: 45 minutes
- Production companies: Logical Thinkers; Ramesh Dev Productions

Original release
- Network: Colors Marathi
- Release: 21 March 2011 – 1 October 2023

Dholkichya Talavar (transl. To the beat of the drummer) is a Marathi language dance reality show, where dancers compete to win the title of "Lavani Samradyni". The first two seasons were produced by Logical Thinkers and Ramesh Dev Production. The third season was produced by Logical Thinkers in July 2015. The fourth season was aired from March 2016 and the fifth season was aired from May 2017. The sixth season is airing from 1 July 2023.

It is directed and produced by Santosh Kolhe, written by Chinmay Kulkarni and directed by Sukhvinder Singh Chauhan. The project was held by Vipul Avinash Mehta. It was a special season of the show as entertainment rather than competition shown on Colors Marathi in March 2016. Foreign artists like Suzanne Bernert have also taken part in this reality show.

== Contestants ==
=== Season 1 ===
- Vaishali Jadhav - Winner
- Sneha Wagh
- Sonali Khare
- Suzanne Bernert Semi Finalist

=== Season 3 ===
- Manava Naik
- Neha Pendse
- Shweta Salve
- Narayani Shastri
- Shruti Marathe
- Bhargavi Chirmule
- Ritika Shrotri
- Gayatri Soham
- Ashwini Kasar

=== Season 4 ===
The fourth season started on 21 March 2016. The episodes featured flash mobs, fusion with western dances, a property round and a live music round. Dipali Sayyad, Vishwas Patil, Shakuntala Nagarkar and Manasi Naik are the jury for this season. The anchor of the show is actor Subodh Bhave.

- Mrunmayee Gondhalekar = Winner
- Vaishnavi Patil = 1st Runner-up
- Sayali Paradkar = 2nd Runner-up
- Richa Agnihotri = Finalist
- Shuchika Joshi = Finalist
- Meera Joshi = Eliminated
- Nazneen Shaikh = Eliminated
- Aishwarya Badade = Eliminated
- Sharmila Shinde = Eliminated
- Chani = Eliminated
- Akshaya Malvankar = Eliminated
- Sanika Abhyankar = Eliminated

=== Contestants in 2016 are ===
- Minakshi Poshe = Winner
- Palak More = Winner
- Rutuja Junnarkar = 1st Runner-up
- Ishwari Nimbore = 1st Runner-up
- Samruddhi Kelkar = 2nd Runner-up
- Dhanishthha Katkar = 2nd Runner-up
- Chinmayi Salvi = Eliminated; Re-entered as a Wild Card; Finalist
- Samruddhi Shendage = Eliminated; Re-entered as a Wild Card; Finalist
- Dhanashree Dhhomase = Finalist
- Anushka Deshpande = Finalist
- Snehal Patil = Eliminated
- Tanaya Acharekar = Eliminated
- Ankita Tare = Eliminated
- Arya Angre = Eliminated
- Dipali Naigaonkar = Eliminated
- Siddhi Tambe = Eliminated
- Apurva Undalkar = Eliminated
- Joya Khan = Eliminated
- Prachiti Kulkarni = Eliminated
- Bhumika Gauda = Eliminated
- Tejashree Gugale = Eliminated
- Chahat Shaikh = Eliminated
- Asmita Surve = Eliminated
- Shambhavi Bharekar = Eliminated

=== Season 6 ===
- Neha Patil = Winner
- Shubham Borade = 1st Runner-up
- Namrata Sangule = 2nd Runner-up
- Kajal Shekhar Gosavi
- Yadnya Sawant
- Bhairavi Mistry
- Aditi Jadhav
- Dhanishtha Katkar
- Tanuja Shinde
- Samtaa Aamne
- Purva Salekar
- Sanjana Seria
- Priya Naskar
- Sanika Bhagwat

== Reception ==
Week	Year	TAM TVR	Rank		Ref.
Week	Year	TAM TVR	Mah/Goa	All India	Ref.
Week 12	2012	0.74	2	81	
15 April 2012	Grand Finale	0.65	4	89	
