= Dhag =

- Theatrical poster
- Directed by: Shivaji Lotan Patil
- Screenplay by: Nitin Dixit
- Story by: Nitin Dixit; Shivaji Patil
- Produced by: Vishal Gavare
- Starring: Usha Jadhav; Upendra Limaye; Nagesh Bhosale
- Cinematography: Nagraj M Diwakar
- Edited by: Nilesh Gavand
- Music by: Aadi Ramchandra
- Production company: Jayashree Motion Pictures
- Distributed by: DAR Motion Pictures
- Release dates: January 2012 (Pune Film Festival); 7 March 2014 (India)
- Running time: 143 minutes
- Country: India
- Language: Marathi

Dhag (Marathi: धग, meaning Blaze) is an Indian Marathi film directed by Shivaji Lotan Patil. The story of the film is of a young boy wanting to break the successions of traditional jobs in his low caste family. The film was released on 7 March 2014, by DAR Film Distributors. Initial Public Relation activity was done by Ram Kondilkar then its marketing and PR for the film was done by Newsmax Multimedia Pvt. Ltd. The film was released in national and international film festivals.

The film has won in a total of 47 awards which includes 3 awards at the 60th National Film Awards : Best Director, Best Actress for Usha Jadhav and a Special Jury mention for performance by a child actor for Hansraj Jagtap.

== Plot ==
Dhag is the story of Krishna, his mother and their seemingly ambitious aspirations for Krishna, against the backdrop of their socio-economic standing.

Raised by a father who cremated people for a living, Krishna’s mother always wanted him to pave a path for himself that takes him away from the sorrows and hardship of his legacy. While his father’s untimely death opens the gates of opportunity for young Krishna, the plight of his widowed helpless mother reels him back to his origins. Dhag captures the moments, trials and tribulations of young Krishna along the journey.

== Cast ==
- Usha Jadhav as Yashoda, Krishna's mother
- Hansraj Jagtap as Krishna
- Upendra Limaye as Shripati, Krishna's father
- Nagesh Bhosale
- Suhasini Deshpande
- Neha Dakhinkar

== Awards ==
- National Film Awards - 60th National Film Awards
  - Best Director - Shivaji Lotan Patil
  - Best Actress - Usha Jadhav
  - Special Jury mention - Hansraj Jagtap
- Maharashtra Times Sanmaan Awards
  - Best Director (film) - Shivaji Lotan Patil
  - Best Actress (film) - Usha Jadhav
  - Best Supporting Actor (film) - Upendra Limaye
  - Best Child Actor (film) - Hansraj Jagtap
  - Best Screenplay - Nitin Dixit
