= Sakal Tar Hou Dya =

2025 Indian drama film

- Directed by: Aalok Jain
- Written by: Aalok Jain
- Story by: Aalok Jain
- Produced by: Namrata Sinha
- Starring: Subodh Bhave; Manasi Naik
- Cinematography: Sunil Patel
- Music by: Rohit Raut
- Production company: Shrey Picture Company
- Release date: 10 October 2025
- Country: India
- Language: Marathi

Sakal Tar Hou Dya is a 2025 Indian Marathi-language film directed by Aalok Jain. The film stars Subodh Bhave and Manasi Naik in the lead roles. The film was released theatrically in Maharashtra on 10 October 2025.

== Plot ==
The film focuses on interpersonal relationships in an urban family setting.

== Cast ==
- Subodh Bhave as Abhay Purandare
- Manasi Naik as Niyati

== Production ==
The film Sakal Tar Hou Dya was announced with Subodh Bhave and Manasi Naik in the lead roles, marking their first collaboration in a Marathi feature. The project is produced by Namrata Sinha under the Shrey Picture Company banner, with writing and direction by Aalok Jain, who has previously worked in Hindi cinema.

Principal photography for the film began in Madhya Pradesh in February 2025, as reported during the early phase of production.

== Marketing ==
The teaser of the film was released prior to its theatrical release. The official trailer was released through digital platforms ahead of the film's release.

== Music ==
The song "Nach Mora" from the film Sakal Tar Hou Dya was released ahead of the film's theatrical release. The song features the lead actors Subodh Bhave and Manasi Naik and was launched as part of the film's promotional activities prior to its release date of 10 October 2025.

== Reception ==
Santosh Bhingarde of Sakal reviewed the film and noted its conventional storyline, slow initial pacing, and a dramatic turn by the interval. The review referred to the director's handling of drama within a limited setting and the focus on two central characters, along with the performances of Subodh Bhave and Manasi Naik. Reshma Naikwar, writing for Loksatta, reviewed the film with reference to its relationship-driven themes, restrained direction, and reliance on performances and dialogue to advance the narrative. Sanjay Ghavare of Lokmat reviewed the film and referred to its relationship-centred subject matter, measured pacing, and emphasis on the lead performances within a limited dramatic framework.

=== Accolades ===
==== Winners ====
- 2026: Ambernath Marathi Chitrapat Mahotsav for Best Debut Producer – Namrata Sinha
- 2026: Ambernath Marathi Chitrapat Mahotsav for Best Debut Director – Aalok Jain
- 2026: Ambernath Marathi Chitrapat Mahotsav for Best Actor – Subodh Bhave
- 2026: Ambernath Marathi Chitrapat Mahotsav for Best Actress – Manasi Naik
- 2026: Sanskrutik Kaladarpan for Best Actor – Subodh Bhave
- 2026: Sanskrutik Kaladarpan for Best Actress – Manasi Naik
