= 31st October (film) =

2016 Indian Hindi-language historical action drama film

- Promotional release poster
- Directed by: Shivaji Lotan Patil
- Written by: Amit Tuli; Harry Sachdeva
- Produced by: Harry Sachdeva
- Starring: Soha Ali Khan; Vir Das; Lakha Lakhwinder Singh; Pritam Kagne
- Cinematography: Ramani Ranjan Das
- Release dates: 29 September 2015 (Vancouver); 21 October 2016 (India)
- Country: India
- Language: Hindi

31st October is an Indian Hindi-language historical action drama film directed by Shivaji Lotan Patil and written by Amit Tuli and Harry Sachdeva and produced by Sachdeva. The film, based on a true story, focuses on the aftermath of Indira Gandhi's assassination which occurred on 31 October 1984.

Starring Vir Das and Soha Ali Khan, it was released on 21 October 2016.

== Plot ==
On 31 October 1984, the Prime Minister of India was assassinated by her Sikh Security Guards. Politicians used this incident to spark public hatred towards the Sikhs, labelling them as traitors. Devender Singh and his family are stuck in their house as their city plummets. In 24 hours of uncertain oscillations, helplessness, and with their relatives dying and neighbours turning hostile, Devender's family seeks help from their Hindu friends who live across town. As Pal, Tilak and Yogesh travel to save Devender's family, they come face-to-face with the destruction of humanity. They witness the carnage and the moral corruption that makes men turn into savages. In their attempt to ferry Devender's family to safety, Pal, Tilak and Yogesh must face their own demons first.

== Cast ==
- Soha Ali Khan as Tajinder Kaur
- Vir Das as Davinder Singh
- Akshat R Saluja as Luvleen
- Lakha Lakhwinder Singh as Yogesh
- Deepraj Rana as Pal
- Vineet Sharma as Tilak
- Nagesh Bhonsle as Inspector Dahiya
- Daya Shankar Pandey
- Pritam Kagne
- Maneet Vaghadia as Gudia
- Sezal Sharma

== Release ==
31st October had its official screening at the London Indian Film festival on 18 and 20 July 2015. It released in theatres on 21 October 2016.

== Soundtrack ==
All the songs of 31st October are composed by Vijay Verma, while the lyrics are penned by Mehboob and Moazzam Azam. The album was released on 14 September 2016 under the Zee Music Company music label. The soundtrack consists of 8 tracks.

"Umeed" - Reprise Version - Babbu Maan

"Yaqeen" - Sonu Nigam

"Andhere" - Asha Bhosle

"Rabb De Bande" - Harshdeep Kaur

"Umeed" - Javed Ali

"Maula" - Vijay Verma, Ustad Ghulam Mustafa Khan

"Andhere" - Male Version - Vijay Verma

"Yaqeen" - Reprise Version - Mohammad Salamat
