= Chintamani (2014 film) =

2014 Indian film

- Directed by: Sangeeta Balchandran
- Starring: Bharat Jadhav; Amruta Subhash; Tejashree Walawalkar; Ruchita Jadhav
- Cinematography: Suresh Suvarna
- Music by: Sanjeev Kohli
- Release date: 31 October 2014
- Country: India
- Language: Marathi

Chintamani is an Indian Marathi language film directed by Sangeeta Balchandran. The film stars Bharat Jadhav, Amruta Subhash, Tejashree Walawalkar and Ruchita Jadhav. Music by Sanjeev Kohli. The film was released on 31 October 2014.

== Synopsis ==
The story of a common man, who shares a normal life with his wife and daughter. But at the same time, he is tired of being mocked by others for being a nobody. His life takes a sharp turn when he gets involved in a get-rich-quick scheme and must fight for his survival.

== Cast ==
- Bharat Jadhav as Chintamani
- Amruta Subhash as Aarti
- Tejashree Walawalkar as Kimaya
- Ruchita Jadhav as Neha
- Uday Tikekar
- Hemangee Rao
- Milind Shinde
- Kamlesh Sawant
- Jayraj Nair
- Kishor Pradhan
- Shobha Pradhan
- Maadhav Deochake

== Soundtrack ==
Chintamani

Soundtrack album by Sanjeev Kohli
- Released: 2014
- Recorded: 2014
- Genre: Feature film soundtrack
- Length: 14:16
- Language: Marathi

Official audio
- Chintamani – Full Album on YouTube

Track listing
No.	Title	Singer(s)	Length
1.	"Mala Pahtana"	Swapnil Bandodkar	5:08
2.	"Ikde Ye Javal Ye na"	Vaishali Samant	5:07
3.	"Kadhitari Kuthetari"	Amruta Subhash, Mugdha Vaishampayan	4:01
Total length:			14:16

== Critical response ==
Chintamani film received negative reviews from critics. Mihir Bhanage of The Times of India gave the film 2 stars out of 5 and wrote "Clichéd dialogues and a predictable storyline are the major drawbacks in this film. The loose ends and unexplained addition of characters only adds to the woes". Ganesh Matkari of Pune Mirror wrote " A pity because the failure of the film is not in the genre itself but the poor treatment it receives here". A Reviewer of Maharashtra Times Wrote "The dialogue seems dull. The rest is 'thank you' on the levels of music and songwriting. The worst part is the length of the movie". A Reviewer of Loksatta says "I don't understand the intention of the writer-director for showing such irrationality. Many pre-interval scenes make the movie boring and ridiculous".
