= Murder Mestri =

- मर्डर मेस्त्री
- Directed by: Rahul Jadhav
- Screenplay by: Prashant Loke
- Story by: Neha Kamat
- Produced by: Abrar I. Nadiadwala; Vaibhav Bhor
- Starring: Vandana Gupte; Dilip Prabhavalkar; Kranti Redkar; Sanjay Khapre; Manasi Naik; Vikas Kadam; Hrishikesh Joshi
- Cinematography: Rahul Jadhav
- Edited by: Imran Mahadik; Faisal Mahadik
- Music by: Amar Mohile
- Production company: Nadiadwala GenNext Productions
- Release date: 10 July 2015
- Country: India
- Language: Marathi

Murder Mestri (lit. 'Murder Mystery') is a 2015 Marathi film directed by Rahul Jadhav. Starring Vandana Gupte, Dilip Prabhavalkar, Kranti Redkar, Sanjay Khapre, Manasi Naik, Vikas Kadam, and Hrishikesh Joshi. The movie was released on 10 July 2015.

== Plot ==
Prabhakar, a postman by profession lives with his family in a village in Konkan. The most important in Prabhakar's life is his adorable daughter Pari. Prabhakar is a simple person with no dreams but a weird nature. He is very honest with his duty but has got a strange habit. This strange habit of him not only creates chaos in his & others life but also puts their lives in danger. Will Prabhakar manage to rectify his mistake or people will have to sacrifice their lives for his mistake. That you need to check in the theaters. Come Enjoy the mystery.

== Cast ==
- Vandana Gupte as Mrs. Malini
- Dilip Prabhavalkar as Doctor
- Kranti Redkar as Saraswati
- Sanjay Khapare as Sarpanch
- Manasi Naik as Hemlata
- Vikas Kadam as Madhav
- Hrishikesh Joshi as Prabhakar
- Kamlakar Satpute as Janardan

== Soundtrack ==
Murder Mestri

Soundtrack album by Pankaj Padghan
- Released: 10 July 2015
- Genre: Feature film soundtrack
- Length: 9:30
- Language: Marathi
- Label: Zee Music Company
External audio
- Audio Jukebox on YouTube

The soundtrack of Murder Mestri consists of 3 songs composed by Pankaj Padghan.

Tracklist
| No. | Title | Lyrics | Singer(s) | Length |
|---|---|---|---|---|
| 1. | "Alimili" | Mandar Cholkar | Asha Bhosle | 03:03 |
| 2. | "Sanshyacha Kida" | Guru Thakur | Adarsh Shinde | 02:49 |
| 3. | "Jivala Laglay Ghor" | Guru Thakur | Adarsh Shinde | 03:42 |
| Total length: | | | | 9:30 |

== Critical reception ==
Prasanna D Zore of Rediff gave the film a rating of 4 out of 5 saying that, "The comedy is clean, simple, silly. Yet, you long for more. And it does keep coming." Keyur Seta of Marathi Stars gave the film a rating of 2.5 out of 5 saying that, "Murder Mestri is an average, one-time watch comedy."
