= Khurchi =

2024 Marathi-language film

- Directed by: Shiv Mane; Santosh Hagavane
- Written by: Santosh Hagavane
- Produced by: Santosh Hagavane; Yogita Gawli; Pradeep Natthisingh Nagar
- Starring: Raqesh Bapat; Akshay Waghmare; Aryan Hagavane
- Cinematography: Yogesh M. Koli
- Edited by: Rohan Patil; Rahul Lokahnde
- Music by: Sanmeet Waghmare; Abhishek Kate; Devdutta Manisha Baji
- Production companies: Aaradhya Motion Films; Yogasha Films
- Release date: 12 January 2024
- Running time: 111 minutes
- Country: India
- Language: Marathi

Khurchi (transl. Chair) is a 2024 Indian Marathi language political drama film directed by Shiv Dharmaraj Mane and Santosh Kusum Hagavane and produced under Aaradhya Motion Films and Yogasha Films. The film features an ensemble cast of Raqesh Bapat, Akshay Waghmare, Aryan Hagavane, and Pritam Kagne. The plot revolves around power, chair, murder, fights and blood.

It was released theatrically on 12 January 2024.

== Cast ==
- Raqesh Bapat
- Akshay Waghmare as Samrat
- Aryan Hagavane as Rajveer Rajaram Desai
- Pritam Kagne
- Shreya Pasalkar
- Mahesh Ghag
- Kalyani Nandkishor
- Suresh Vishwakarma as Sarjerao
- Meghraj Raje Bhosale in a special appearance
- Aaradhana Sharma in a special appearance

== Production ==
The motion poster was released in mid-June 2020 with a strong voice of the child in the background. The poster of the film was released in 2021 with the tagline 'आता खुर्ची आपलीच'. Child actor Aryan Hagavane, who plays a pivotal role in this films makes his debut. Waghmare gained 5 kg weight to fit in his role.

== Soundtrack ==
The songs in the film are written by Prashant Madpuvar, Saurabh and Somnath Shinde and music is composed by Sanmit Waghmare, Abhishek Kate. Adarsh Shinde, Avadhoot Gupte, Abhay Jodhpurkar, Rasika Vakherkar, Amita Ghugri and Aryan have sung the songs. The background music is done by Devdutt Manisha Baji.

Track listing
No.	Title	Lyrics	Music	Singer(s)	Length
1.	"Gungala Assa"	Prashant Madpuwar	Abhishek Kate	Abhay Jodhpurkar, Amita Ghugari	4:50
2.	"Ekach Raja Hya Khurchicha Haay"	Sanki Swarrbh	Sanmeet Waghmare	Adarsh Shinde	4:20
3.	"Belanchi Nagin"	Sanjay Shinde	Sanmeet Waghmare	Avadhoot Gupte, Rasika Wakharkar	4:26
4.	"Khurchi Rap"	Sanki Swarrbh	Sanmeet Waghmare	Aarayan Hagavane, Sanmeet Waghmare	3:37
Total length:					17:25

== Release and reception ==
The film release date was announced on 16 October 2023. The teaser and trailer of the Khurchi was released on 7 December 2023 and 2 January 2024.
