= Love Lagna Locha =

Indian Marathi language TV series

- Genre: Sitcom; Romance
- Written by: Sunil Harishchandra; Sukhada Ayare
- Directed by: Shailesh Kale; Jayant Pawar
- Starring: See below
- Country of origin: India
- Original language: Marathi
- No. of episodes: 416

Production
- Producer: Vidyadhar Pathare
- Camera setup: Multi-camera
- Running time: 22 minutes

Original release
- Network: Zee Yuva
- Release: 22 August 2016 – 17 February 2018

Love Lagna Locha is an Indian Marathi language TV series which is produced by Vidyadhar Pathare. It aired on Zee Yuva from 22 August 2016 and ended on 17 February 2018. It stars Omkar Govardhan, Saksham Kulkarni and Vivek Sangle in lead roles.

== Plot ==
It is a story of group of friends; Sumeet, Vinay and Raghav. Sumeet is career-minded, Raghav is flirty and Vinay is struggling to find a wife. The other friends are their colleagues and neighbours.

== Cast ==
=== Main ===
- Omkar Govardhan as Sumeet
- Saksham Kulkarni as Vinay
- Vivek Sangle as Raghav (Raghvendra)

=== Recurring ===
- Ruchita Jadhav as Kavya
- Shrikar Pitre as Abhiman
- Siddhi Karkhanis as Shalmali
- Sameeha Sule as Akansha
- Akshaya Gurav as Soumya
- Anuja Prabhukeluskar as Puja
- Mayuri Wagh as Rutu
- Pallavi Patil as Rucha
- Vijay Nikam as Mr. More
- Sneha Raikar as Mrs. More
- Sameer Khandekar as Shrikant More
- Ramesh Wani as Harishchandra Nagpurkar
- Pournima Ahire as Vinay's mother
- Shubhangi Latkar as Maasaheb
- Rohan Gujar as Vinay's friend
- Sneha Kate as Rupmati Vinay
- Sonal Pawar as Radhika
- Hrishikesh Shelar as Vighnesh
- Vinesh Ninnurkar as Shital

=== Guest appearance ===
- Prarthana Behere
- Neetha Shetty
- Kranti Redkar
- Adarsh Shinde
