= Dholki (2015 film) =

India film

- Directed by: Raju Desai; Vishal Desai
- Produced by: Shirish Pattanshetty
- Starring: Siddhartha Jadhav; Manasi Naik; Sayaji Shinde
- Cinematography: Rahul Jadhav
- Edited by: Godfrey Gonsalves
- Music by: Tubby Parikh
- Release date: 28 August 2015
- Country: India
- Language: Marathi

Dholki is an Indian Marathi language film directed by Raju Desai and Vishal Desai. The film stars Siddhartha Jadhav, Manasi Naik, Kashmira Kulkarni and Sayaji Shinde. Music by Tubby Parikh. The film was released on 28 August 2015.

== Synopsis ==
Lala, who happens to find his late father's 'dholki', realises that he has a talent for playing it. However, his mother is worried that his passion would lead him to trouble with the village head.

== Cast ==
- Siddhartha Jadhav as Lala
- Manasi Naik
- Kashmira Kulkarni
- Sayaji Shinde as Patil
- Jyoti Chandekar as Lala's Mother
- Sanjay Kulkarni
- Dr Vilas Ujawane
- Vijay Nikam

== Soundtrack ==
Dholki

Soundtrack album by Tubby Parikh
- Released: 2015
- Recorded: 2015
- Genre: Feature film soundtrack
- Length: 25:01
- Language: Marathi

Official audio
- Dholki – Full Album on YouTube

Track listing
No.	Title	Singer(s)	Length
1.	"Dhin Tang"	Adarsh Shinde, Vaishali Samant	4:38
2.	"Keshava Majala"	Adarsh Shinde	2:51
3.	"Keshava Majala Tujhya"	Adarsh Shinde	2:17
4.	"Je Je Ure Jagaat"	Adarsh Shinde	10:46
5.	"Asa Wajwa Ki"	Bela Shende	5:09
Total length:			25:01

== Critical response ==
Dholki film received mixed reviews from critics. Mihir Bhanage of The Times of India gave the film a rating of 2.5/5 and wrote "Dholki subsequently slips into nothing more than a formulaic film that will enthrall the front-row audience at single screens". Soumitra Pote of Maharashtra Times gave the film a rating of 2.5/5 and wrote "Overall, This is a movie for a small audience. If you want to watch a movie as a time pass without getting kick in the head, there is no problem in taking a chance".
