= Usha Jadhav =

Indian actress

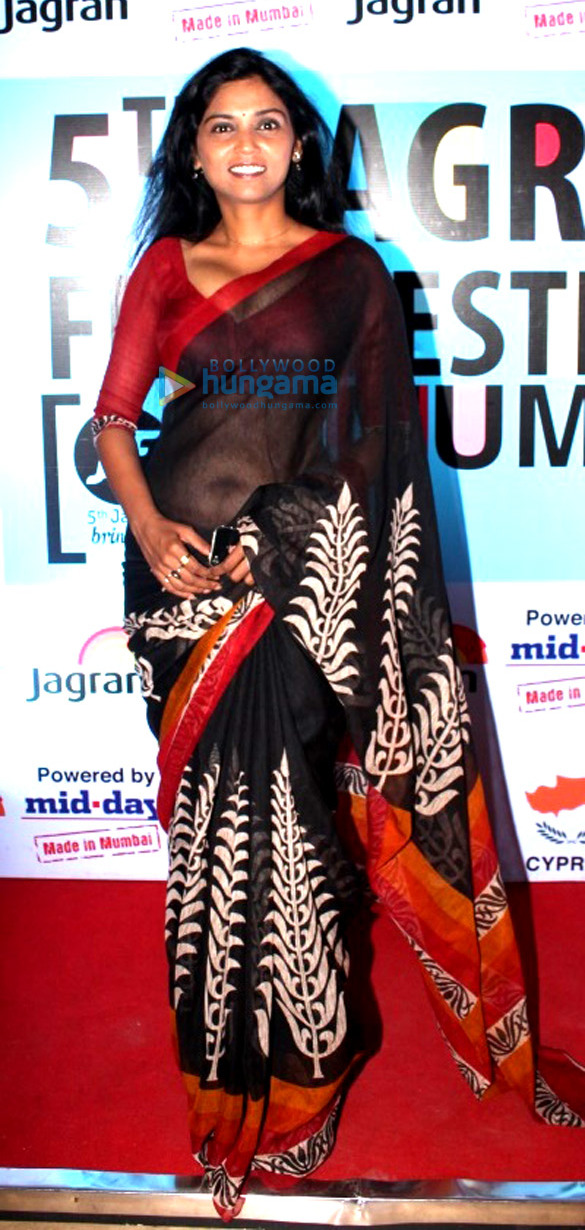
- Usha Jadhav at 5th Jagran Film Festival
- Born: Kolhapur, Maharashtra, India. Lives in Spain
- Occupation: Actress
- Partner: Alejandro Cortés Calahorra
- Website: http://www.ushajadhav.com/

Usha Jadhav is an Indian actress who predominantly works in Hindi , Marathi and Spanish language films. First Indian Actor to be the Member of the Academy of Cinematographic Arts and Sciences of Spain (Spanish: Academia de las Artes y las Ciencias Cinematográficas de España). She is best known for her role in the 2012 Marathi film Dhag for which she won National Film Award for Best Actress at the 60th National Film Awards. In 2019, she received the IFFI Best Actor Award (Female) at the 50th International Film Festival of India for her work in Mai Ghat : Crime No 103/2015.

== Career ==
Born and brought up in Kolhapur, Maharashtra, Jadhav moved to Pune for her job in a travel agency. Following her passion for art, she moved to Mumbai in search of various roles while still continuing her job.

Her journey from an ethnic group called Kaikadi which is a nomadic Tribe in Kolhapur to Mumbai, starring in cinemas and have showed a steady commitment to her professional work.

Jadhav got various opportunities in commercial advertisements like that for Tata DoCoMo, Fevicol, Head & Shoulders, ICICI Bank and more. Her first break in films came with the 2007 Hindi film Traffic Signal, directed by Madhur Bhandarkar, where she was cast in a small role of a girl selling goods at the traffic signal. She also played another small role in the 2009 film Do Paise Ki Dhoop, Chaar Aane Ki Baarish, which was the directorial debut of film actress Deepti Naval starring Manisha Koirala and Rajit Kapur in lead roles.

In 2012, Jadhav was seen alongside Amitabh Bachchan in the advertisements of the 6th season of Kaun Banega Crorepati. She also played the lead role in one episode of the television show Lakhon Mein Ek that aired on Star Plus. The show narrated inspirational fictional stories of common people who brought change in the society. Guest-directed by Anant Mahadevan, the episode featured Jadhav as a young bride who is discriminated for her dark complexion by her in-laws.

"I have just tried to be natural in my own way and would love to play such characters. I am just passionate about acting in films."

— Jadhav speaking about her role in Dhag.

Later the same year, her film Dhag was released, where Jadhav played the lead role of Yashoda. Mother of a teenager, Yashoda wishes that her son should get a good education and not fall into the traditional job of her family, of running the local crematorium. This role of a poor mother fighting the social norms laid on them for their lower caste status got Jadhav various appreciations. The film featured in many film festivals and she was compared with the actress Smita Patil for her acting. Jadhav said that she admired Patil, but refused to admit that she had emulated her. She won the National Film Award for Best Actress for this role.

Usha Jadhav considers Babasaheb Ambedkar as her inspiration. "We all know that Babasaheb wrote the constitution of our country. But the work done by Babasaheb for women at that time when women were considered secondary is very important and for me, it is very inspiring. Dr. Babasaheb Ambedkar has given women various legal rights as well as equal rights through the Constitution. He also raised his voice against various atrocities against women. The message of equality he has given to the world, I follow it and we should all follow it. That's why Babasaheb is my role model" said Usha Jadhav.

== Filmography ==
Year	Title	Role	Language	Notes
2007	Traffic Signal	Mala	Hindi	Feature Film
2009	Do Paise Ki Dhoop, Chaar Aane Ki Baarish		Hindi	Feature Film
2010	Striker	Rajni	Hindi	Feature Film
2010	Ashok Chakra: Tribute to Real Heroes	Machchiwali	Hindi	Feature Film
2010	Gaali		Hindi	Short film
2012	The Mumbai Trilogy		Hindi	Short film
2012	Gubbare		Hindi	Short film
2012	Lakhon Mein Ek		Hindi	TV serial aired on Star Plus; One episode
2012	Dhag	Yashoda	Marathi	National Film Award for Best Actress
	Cinema Ki Aankh		Hindi	Short film
	My Naughty Wife		Hindi	short film
2014	Bhoothnath Returns	Meena	Hindi	Feature Film
2016	Veerappan	Muthulakshmi	Hindi	Feature Film
2018	Firebrand	Sunanda	Marathi	Feature Film
2019	Be Happy	Avni	Spanish	Feature Film
2019	Mai Ghat: Crime No 103/2015	Prabha	Marathi	IFFI Best Actor Award (Female)
2020	RESET ( La Nueva Normalidad chapter)	Mai	Spanish	Feature Film
2024	El Salto	Asma	Spanish	Feature Film

== Awards ==
Year	Award	Category	Film	Result	Ref.
2013	National Film Award (India)	Best Actress	Dhag	Won	
2013	Maharashtra Times Sanmaan Award	Best Actress	Dhag	Won	
2013	Maharashtra State Film Award	Best Actress	Dhag	Won	
2013	BIG Marathi Entertainment Award 2013	Big Entertaining Actor of the year (Female)	Dhag	Won	
2014	The Loreal Paris Femina Women Awards	The Loreal Paris Femina Women Awards for achievement in cinema.	Various	Won	
2019	NYC South Asian International Film Festival	Best Actress	Mai Ghat : Crime No 103/2015	Won	
2019	International Film Festival of India IFFI GOA	Silver Peacock for the Best Actor Award (Female)	Mai Ghat : Crime No 103/2015	Won	
2020	IndoGerman Film Week International Film Festival, Berlin	Best Actress	Mai Ghat : Crime No 103/2015	Won	
