= Deepak Kadam =

Indian director

- Born: 5 January 1981 (age 45); Mumbai, India
- Occupations: Film actor, director, producer
- Years active: 1990–present

Deepak Kadam (born 5 January 1981) is director of various video albums, ad films, TV serials and Marathi feature films as well as an actor and producer. Born and brought up in Mumbai, Maharashtra, he received a Bachelor of Arts degree from Mumbai University. He became a director and actor who has accumulated many years of experience on Marathi stage and feature films. His movie Waakya was screened at Navi Mumbai International Film Festival.

== Filmography ==
=== Early life ===
- Worked with one of the media ad agency, Hindustan Thomsion Associates – Falcrum Division; in Commercial Dept. (1995 to 2000)
- Shiv Communication As Marketing Partner (2000 to 2001)
- Proprietor of On Air Entertainment, which deals into event management, AD Making, production & media marketing (2000)

=== Theater ===
- Karmabhog(For Marathi Rajya Natya Spardha award-winning drama)
- Tujhi Ti Majhi(comedy play)

=== Director ===
- "PURASHA"

Award winning film as a Director

- "ATROCITY" as a Director
- "NAGARSEVAK Ek Nayak" as a Director
- Indian Premacha Lafda (as a director)
- Waakya (as a director and producer at Maooli Nirmit)
- Laxmi Tuzyavina (as a director)
- Mee Ek Saudamini (as a director for Rama Arts pvt.ltd)
- Eka Lagnachi Gost (as a director for Geetvinod Chitralaya)
- verdict (Hit all over maharashtra)
- Ashi Hi Fasava Fasavi (As a Director for Shree Varadvinayak )
- Bhandara premacha (As a director for sagar barseriya films. Pvt.Ltd.)
- Sansarachi Maya (As a Director For 21ts Century films pvt.ltd.)
- Khurchila lagali Mirchi (as a Director)
- Gol maal Premacha (as a Director shree varad vinayak)
- Sangu nighali Samsung (as a director for Erawat chitra pvt.ltd)
- Chabu Palali Sasarla (as a director for Dilipraj Chitra pvt.ltd)
- Saat bara kasa badalala (as a director for s.p.Vision pvt.ltd)
- Sawadhan babachi kathi aali (as a director for Navkiran films)
- Maherche Toran Sasarala as an associate director for Sunanda Chitra, Pune

=== Television ===
Production house	Serial	channel	episode
Niranjan Deoras Production	Sargam	DD 1 Mumbai	52
Apple Production	Rang Birangi	DD 1 Mumbai	52
Niranjan Deoras Production	Gammat Jammat	DD 1 Mumbai	75
Swapnil Films	Hasanysathi Janma Apula	DD 1 Mumbai	13
Icon Pictures Pvt.Ltd	Abhal Toltana	DD 1	20
Varad vinayak chitra nirmit	Haa khel sanchitacha	DD 1 Mumbai	30
N.v.Deoras production	Pratishodh	DD 1 Mumbai	25
Sainath communication pvt.ltd	Aho pappa Jara Japun	DD 1	20
Sun Production	Eka Peksha Ea	DD 1 Mumbai	45
Radaan Films Pvt.Ltd.	Hi Waat Dur Jate	ETV – Marathi	13
Vasundhara Ent. Pvt. Ltd. Niranjan deoras producyion	Matruchhaya	DD Sayadri	20

=== TV AD film director ===
- working for hindusthan lever with H.T.A.(Fulcrum)
- Body Line Lingerie For M/S Suresh Parmar(Undergarments Products)
- Pinch Non Alcoholic Beer For M/S Pinch Botteling Company Pvt.Ltd(2000)
- Jatra Hotels Pvt.Ltd.Nasik(2001 )
- Sha Dhanaji Poonamchand Jewellers Pvt.Ltd(2000)

=== Video album director ===
- Marathi Remix Lavanya (For Padmini Cassettes Pvt.Ltd.)
