= Zenda Swabhimanacha =

- झेंडा स्वाभिमानाचा
- Directed by: Vishwas Ranjane
- Story by: Vishwas Ranjane
- Produced by: Ganesh Ranjane
- Starring: Teshwani Vetal, Akshay Kharat, Prakash Dhotre, Sonal Godbole, Ramchandra Dhumal, Sikandar Mulani, Subhash Khude, Ankush Mandekar, Mauli Purane, Dilip Shende, Nandkishor Gore.
- Edited by: Shrivallabh More
- Music by: Pradip Kadam
- Release date: 17 February 2017
- Country: India
- Language: Marathi

Zenda Swabhimanacha (Marathi: झेंडा स्वाभिमानाचा) is a 2017 Marathi language drama film which is directed by Vishwas Baban Ranjane. The screenplay highlights the current education system.

== Cast ==
- Teshwani Vetal
- Akshay Kharat
- Prakash Dhotre
- Sonal Godbole
- Ramchandra Dhumal
- Sikandar Mulani
- Subhash Khude
- Ankush Mandekar
- Mauli Purane
- Dilip Shende
- Nandkishor Gore
