= Ruchita Jadhav =

Indian actress

- Born: Pune, Maharashtra, India
- Occupations: Actress; Model
- Years active: 2010–present
- Spouse: Anand Mane (m. 2021)

Ruchita Jadhav is an Indian film and television actress who predominantly works in Marathi cinema and television.

== Early life ==
Ruchita Jadhav was born in Pune, Maharashtra. She attended St. Joseph's Convent Girls High School in Pune. She pursued a bachelor's degree in fashion technology and a master’s degree in English literature from Fergusson College in Pune, Maharashtra.

== Career ==
Ruchita debuted in Marathi cinema with Are Baba Pure (2011). She went on to appear in numerous Marathi films, including Fekam Faak (2013), Bhootacha Honeymoon (2013), Vatsalya (2014), Chintamani (2014), Manatlya Unhat (2015), and Manus Ek Mati (2017).

She played the role of Soyarabai Bhosle in the Hindi language historical drama series Veer Shivaji (2011). She starred in the television series Love Lagna Locha (2016), playing Kavya, which was well received by the audience. Other television appearances include Laut Aao Trisha (2014) and Yeh Un Dinon Ki Baat Hai (2017).

== Personal life ==
She married Anand Mane, a Mumbai-based businessman.

== Filmography ==
Year	Title	Role	Notes	Ref
2011	Aare Baba Pure	Aarti	Debut	
2013	Mee Aani U			
2013	Fekam Faak			
2013	Welcome to Jungle	Anushka		
2013	Bhootacha Honeymoon			
2014	Vatsalya	Seema		
2014	Chintamani	Neha		
2015	Goa 350 KM			
2015	Manatlya Unhat			
2016	Aata Majhi Hatli	Neha		
2017	Manus Ek Mati	Vidya		
2017	Bhavishyachi Aishi Taishi	Priya		
2021	Enigma - The Fallen Angel	Richa Kapoor	Short	
2021	Jivan Sandhya	Pratibha Abhyankar		
2023	Surya			

== Television ==
Year	Title	Role	Language	Channel	Ref.
2010	Maziya Priyala Preet Kalena		Marathi	Zee Marathi	
2011	Veer Shivaji	Soyarabai Bhosle	Hindi	Zee TV	
2014-2015	Laut Aao Trisha	Neha	Hindi	Life OK	
2015	Yek Number		Marathi	Star Pravah	
2016-2018	Love Lagna Locha	Kavya	Marathi	Zee Yuva	
2017-2019	Yeh Un Dinon Ki Baat Hai	Vanitha	Hindi	Sony TV	
2019	Fomo	Divya	Marathi	Web Series	
2023	Mi Punha Yein		Marathi	Web Series	
