= Manus Ek Mati =

- Directed by: Suresh Shankar Zadhe
- Written by: Suresh Shankar Zadhe
- Produced by: Sharda Vijaykumar Kharat
- Starring: Siddharth Jadhav, Ruchita Jadhav, Ganesh Yadav, Swapnil Rajshekhar, Vilas Ujawne, Harsha Gupte, Varad Chavan
- Cinematography: Sandeep Shinde
- Edited by: Vijay Wamanrao
- Music by: Prashant Hedau, Amar Desai
- Production company: Shivam Entertainment India Limited
- Distributed by: Sunshine Studio
- Release date: 24 March 2017
- Running time: 130 minsutes
- Country: India
- Language: Marathi

Manus Ek Mati is a Marathi film released theatrically on 24 March 2017. This film is presented by Shivam Saheli Pariwar and is produced under the banner Shivam Entertainment India Ltd by Sharda Vijaykumar Kharat. The film is directed by Suresh Shankar Zade. Vijaykumar Kharat and Dilip Nimbekar are the co-producers and Deva Pande is the executive producer of this film.

== Cast ==
- Siddharth Jadhav
- Ruchita Jadhav
- Ganesh Yadav
- Swapnil Rajshekhar
- Vilas Ujawane
- Harsha Gupte
- Heena Panchal as an item number

== Soundtrack ==
No.	Title	Singer(s)	Lyrics	Music	Length	Reference
1.	"Sakhya Re Sajana"	Swapnil bandodkar, Neha Rajpal	Prashant Hedaoo	Prashant Hedaoo	3:54	
2.	"India Dance Karega"	Adarsh Shinde	Prashant Hedaoo, Vinod Dhotre	Prashant Hedaoo	3:20	
3.	"Tumchyasathi Pavhan"	Bela Shende	Prashant Hedaoo	Prashant Hedaoo	2:34	
4.	"Bebo Bebo"	Adarsh Shinde, Sheenz Arora	Arun Patekar	Prashant Hedaoo	3:59	

== Production ==
Manus Ek Mati is set on the backdrop of today's busy lifestyle which makes people forget their relationship with others. In this film Siddharth Jadhav will be seen in a new look. Siddharth is playing an old man in this film. His character will be a person who does something visionary or important in the story of this film. Actress Smita Gondkar will be seen in a lavani song while Indra Kumar, Heena Panchal and Milind Gunaji will be seen in item song.

The film's music is directed by Mr. Prashant Hedaoo and film's Background score is done by Mr. Salil Amrute. The poster of this film was launched in Mumbai.
