= Bhavishyachi Aishi Taishi =

- Directed by: Surendra Verma
- Written by: Chandra Talware
- Produced by: Ramesh Talware
- Starring: Varsha Usgaonkar; Manasi Naik; Ruchita Jadhav; Karol Zine
- Music by: Salil Amrute
- Release date: 6 October 2017
- Country: India
- Language: Marathi

Bhavishyachi Aishi Taishi - The Prediction is an Indian Marathi language film releasing on 6 October 2017. It is a story of three young Maharashrian girls working and staying together with different views on life in general. All is well in their small world until a fateful day when an encounter with an astrologer changes their lives forever.

== Cast ==
- Varsha Usgaonkar
- Sundeep Kochar
- Manasi Naik as Megha
- Ruchita Jadhav as Priya
- Karol Zine as Nishigandha
- Asawari Joshi
- Kishor Nandlaskar
- Ananda Karekar

== Media Mentions ==
- Ozee
- Mega Marathi
- Now Running
- Bollywood Trade
- Gomolo
