= Sattamum Neethiyum =

2025 Indian television series

- Promotional poster
- Genre: Courtroom drama
- Created by: Sooriya Prathap S.
- Written by: Sooriya Prathap S.
- Directed by: Balaji Selvaraj
- Starring: Saravanan; Namritha MV
- Music by: Vibin Baskar
- Country of origin: India
- Original language: Tamil
- No. of seasons: 2
- No. of episodes: 13

Production
- Producer: Sasikala Prabhakaran
- Cinematography: S. Gokulakrishnan
- Editor: Raavanan
- Production company: 18 Creators

Original release
- Network: ZEE5

Sattamum Neethiyum (transl. Law and justice) is a 2025 Indian Tamil-language courtroom drama web series directed by Balaji Selvaraj in his directorial debut. The series is written and created by Sooriya Prathap S. and produced by Sasikala Prabhakaran under the banner 18 Creators. It stars Saravanan and Namritha MV in lead roles and premiered on 18 July 2025.

Following the success of the first season, Zee 5 renewed the show for a second season, which released on 23 October 2026.

== Premise ==
The series follows Sundaramoorthy, a notary public who has stayed away from active legal practice due to past experiences. His life changes when Kuppusamy, a man seeking justice for his missing daughter, self-immolates in front of a courthouse. The incident prompts Sundaramoorthy to file a public interest litigation, leading him to return to courtroom proceedings. He is joined by Aruna, a junior lawyer, as they take on a case involving political influence and institutional challenges. The narrative explores legal and moral issues within the judicial system through the lens of an individual pursuing justice.

== Cast and characters ==
- Saravanan as Sundaramoorthy
- Namritha MV as Aruna
- Aroul D. Shankar as Viswanath
- Shanmugham as Kuppusamy
- Iniya Ram as Vennila
- Mahadev Payyakkal as Judge 1
- Thiruselvam as Adhi
- Vijayashree as Valli
- Dhanishtan as Councillor
- Nishanth as Hari
- Salem Pugazhenthi as Head Constable Thirupathi
- Aaryan as Sub-Inspector Tamizh
- Deva as Varadhan
- Jayashree Binuraj as Indira
- Sai Varsha Seetharaman as Keerthi
- Gokul S as Chezhiyan
- Varalaxmi Sarathkumar as Chandra
- Prem Kumar (Tamil actor) as Kanagavel

== Episodes ==
=== Series overview ===
| Series | Episodes | Originally released | Network |
|---|---|---|---|
| 1 | 7 | 18 July 2025 | Zee 5 |
| 2 | 6 | 23 October 2026 | Zee 5 |

==== Season 1 ====
| No. | Title | Directed by | Original release date |
|---|---|---|---|
| 1 | "Flames of Justice" | Balaji Selvaraj | 18 July 2025 |
Sundaramoorthy, a quiet yet astute lawyer, files a public interest litigation following the self-immolation of Kuppusamy within the court premises. He is supported in the case by Aruna, a determined junior lawyer.
| 2 | "Sparks of Change" | Balaji Selvaraj | 18 July 2025 |
Sundaramoorthy looks into the abduction of Vennila, Kuppusamy’s daughter, but his efforts with Aruna at various police stations lead to no breakthrough.
| 3 | "Breaking Point" | Balaji Selvaraj | 18 July 2025 |
Sundaramoorthy and Aruna are taken aback to learn that Kuppusamy has been undergoing psychiatric treatment for several years. They decide to change the case from a public interest litigation to a habeas corpus petition, with Vishwanath representing the prosecution.
| 4 | "Surmount the Challenge" | Balaji Selvaraj | 18 July 2025 |
As Sundaramoorthy and Aruna delve deeper into Kuppusamy’s case, they begin to uncover complexities that challenge their initial assumptions. The courtroom is stunned when Vishwanath unexpectedly produces Vennila before the judge.
| 5 | "The Hunt for the Truth" | Balaji Selvaraj | 18 July 2025 |
Sundaramoorthy and Aruna uncover the involvement of influential individuals in the case, leading to Vishwanath’s active role. As the truth behind Vennila’s disappearance begins to emerge, Sundaramoorthy is taken into custody.
| 6 | "The Concealed Reality" | Balaji Selvaraj | 18 July 2025 |
Sundaramoorthy and Aruna come across Varadhan, who appears to be connected to Vennila’s disappearance. They eventually find the real Vennila, who is grief-stricken over her father’s death but reluctant to come forward publicly.
| 7 | "The Truth Unveiled" | Balaji Selvaraj | 18 July 2025 |
As Vishwanath delivers his closing arguments, Sundaramoorthy watches on, powerless. In a pivotal moment, Vennila steps into the courtroom to honour her father’s sacrifice and disclose the truth.

==== Season 2 ====
| No. | Title | Directed by | Original release date |
|---|---|---|---|
| 1 | "The Resolution" | Balaji Selvaraj | 23 October 2026 |
Chandra's quest for justice in Kanagavel's death leads to a legal clash with Sundaramoorthy.
| 2 | "The Question of Death" | Balaji Selvaraj | 23 October 2026 |
Kanagavel's case intensifies as Chandra and Sundaramoorthy clash for justice.
| 3 | "Beyond the Statement" | Balaji Selvaraj | 23 October 2026 |
Conflicting accounts cast doubt on the evidence against the accused.
| 4 | "A Trial of Lies" | Balaji Selvaraj | 23 October 2026 |
Witness accounts uncover inconsistencies in the case surrounding Kanagavel's death.
| 5 | "The Bitter Victory" | Balaji Selvaraj | 23 October 2026 |
Sundaramoorthy challenges the Special Investigation Team's case against the accused officers.
| 6 | "A Twist In The Truth" | Balaji Selvaraj | 23 October 2026 |
New clues emerge as the search for truth in Kanagavel's death reaches a turning point.

== Release ==
The series premiered on 18 July 2025 on ZEE5.

== Reception ==
=== Season 1 ===
Cinaminbox rated the series 3/5 and wrote "Although the story by writer Surya Pratap S. resembles some of the courtroom dramas that have already been released, he has interestingly moved it in a different style through the screenplay and twists." Mari S of Tamil.Filmibeat rated the series 2.5/5, noting that Saravanan delivers a convincing performance and is the main reason to stay engaged. While Namritha and others perform decently, the acting falls short in parts due to a largely new cast. Angusam News awarded the series a score of 45 out of 100 praising its authenticity in depicting legal workflows, but notes it doesn’t deliver the high-stakes drama viewers might expect.

=== Season 2 ===
Sattamum Needhiyum Season 2 received generally positive-to-mixed reviews from critics, with several reviewers describing it as a more polished and engaging continuation than the first season.

Cinema Express reviewer Avinash Ramachandran wrote that the legal and investigative portions were handled with restraint rather than melodrama, creating a “solid procedural without bells and whistles.” He also praised the alternating structure between police investigation and courtroom proceedings, while arguing that the resolution felt rushed and that the investigators were portrayed too simplistically. The Times of India similarly found the season efficient and consistently watchable, noting that the case was resolved through forensic and testimonial evidence rather than action sequences. Its review, however, observed that the recurring hearing-flashback pattern made the narrative feel overly scheduled and that the central twist was foreseeable.
