= Jhing Chik Jhing =

- Jhing Chik Jhing poster
- Directed by: Nitin Nandan
- Written by: Nitin Nandan
- Produced by: Shishir Kulkarni; Shirish Raut; Harini Calamur; Pushpank Gawde
- Starring: Bharat Jadhav; Chinmay Kambli; Madhavi Juvekar; Dilip Prabhavalkar; Aarti More; Sanjay Mone; Uday Sabnis
- Cinematography: Amalendu Choudhary
- Edited by: Rajendra Surve
- Music by: Rahul Ranade
- Production company: Cogito Entertainment Private Limited
- Release date: 11 June 2010
- Running time: 116 minutes
- Country: India
- Language: Marathi

Jhing Chik Jhing is a 2010 Marathi-language film directed by Nitin Nandan and produced by Cogito Entertainment Private Limited. It stars Bharat Jadhav, Dilip Prabhavalkar, Madhavi Juvekar, and Chinmay Kambli, Aarti More and Pratik Dalvi.

It tells the story of a boy growing up in a debt ridden part of India, where farmers routinely commit suicide - sometimes with their families - to escape the debt trap. It tells the story of a boy who dares to hope and dream, and who has ambitions of becoming 'someone' in his life. A boy who refuses to let adversity defeat him.

Jhing Chik Jhing is the debut film for both Nitin Nandan and Cogito Entertainment and has won awards in all major award ceremonies held in Maharashtra

== Plot ==
Shyam (Chinmay Kambli) is a typical 10-year-old boy, mischievous and very inquisitive. His world is made up of his father, Mouli- Bharat Jadhav - mother Manda (Madhavi Juvekar), sister Dipti (Aarti More) & his best friend Gautam (Pratik Dalvi).The family lives in a small house on their cotton farm, somewhere in Central Maharashtra.

The family earns its meagre living by growing cotton, which is sold at the local Government Cotton Mill. The family is in debt to the local money lender Shiva (Uday Sabnis), to the local shopkeeper, and to the fertilizer shop. There is no money, even for essentials. But, Shyam is least concerned with all this. Most of his time is spent in exploring, discovering & playing with Gautam.

The major concerns in his life are the state of his school uniform (a hole in his pants) and whether his mother will make bhajjis (fritters) for dinner. Shyam's idyllic life is thrown asunder when he realises that his family is reeling under debt and his father has all but given up hope of ever getting his farm lands out of mortgage. All dreams of a new school uniform & bhajjis come crashing down.

After overcoming his initial dejection, Shyam takes it upon himself to save his family. He is not so easily overcome by his parents’ sense of impending doom. The lessons he has learnt at school give him reason to hope. One day in school, he comes across an announcement that might just do the trick – a sack race that carries a Winner's Prize of Rupees 10,000/- (approximately US$250).

With the help of Dipti and Gautam, he begins practising with the sack for the big day. Mouli is at first perplexed by Shyam's antics but later joins in enthusiastically. After all he wants to see his family happy in its last few days. Meanwhile, our little hero is hard at practice (sack racing is tougher than it looks), with a single-minded aim of saving his family.

Come D-day, Shyam runs the race of his life – literally! But can he save his family?

== Cast ==
Actor	Character
Bharat Jadhav	Mouli
Chinmay Kambli	Shyam
Madhavi Juvekar	Manda
Aarti More	Dipti
Dilip Prabhavalkar	Kavi
Uday Sabnis	Shiva
Sanjay Mone	Teacher

== Themes ==
Jhing Chik Jhing is based in rural Maharashtra (a western state of India), and its background is the very emotive problem of marginal ownership of land, agrarian debt and the rising problem of farmer suicide. The film looks at these issues through the eyes of a 10-year-old.

Unlike other films that have been made with this backdrop, this film does not descend into bleakness or the loss of hope. On the other hand, it looks at how people can overcome the most trying circumstances.

Shyam, played by Chinmay Kambli in this film, is inspired by the line "if you ask the universe for something, it will conspire to grant you your wish." It helps him break out of the depression and the sense of hopelessness that grips his entire family - when they realise that they are going to lose their farm to the moneylenders because they are unable to repay the debt owed.

The other theme that is woven through the film is the concept of being in balance with nature. The character Kavi - played by Dilip Prabhavalkar, extorts the villagers to give up fertilizer intensive techniques of farming - because they not only pollute the environment, but also render the land fallow and increase costs of farming.

== Production & publicity ==
=== Pre-production and casting ===
Bharat Jadhav is the reigning superstar of Marathi cinema, and has hitherto been known for his roles in slapstick comedy be it on screen or on stage. In Jhing Chik Jhing he plays a hapless marginal farmer - who has nowhere to go, nowhere to run, nowhere to hide. Bharat's character - Mouli - that has won him the Best Actor Award at both MaTa Sanman and the 47th Maharashtra State Awards - is a good man, a good father, a good husband - but is defeated by circumstances. He is in grave danger of losing his land to the money lenders.

Bharat in multiple press conferences has mentioned that he asked the producers and directors - if they were sure they wanted him for this role. But once Bharat agreed to perform this role - he slipped into the character with ease.

The film also marks the appearance of Bharat Jadhav and Dilip Prabhavalkar on screen after almost 6 years. Their last appearance together was in the film Pachadlela.

=== Filming and post-production ===
Production of Jhing Chik Jhing took place in the town of Dhule, in North Western Maharashtra, and adjoining villages. A number of local community members had walk on roles in the film. The film was shot over a 29-day period. Filming took place over two schedules. The first towards the end of 2008, and the other in the first quarter of 2009.

The film had to be shot, keeping the cotton harvest in mind. Most locations used were live locations. These included the Cotton Mill, Schools, Shops, Market and the like.

Post-production took place in Mumbai at Film Labs.

The film has a single song that runs in three different moods through the film. Music and Background Score are by Rahul Ranade, lyrics by Shrirang Godbole.

== Awards ==
The film has won awards in all major Award ceremonies in Maharashtra . It won 7 major awards at the prestigious 47th Maharashtra State Film Awards, including Best Film, and Best Actor.

Chinmay Kambli – best child actor – Maharashtra State Awards, 2010

Bharat Jadhav – best actor – Maharashtra State Awards, 2010

Madhavi Juvekar– best actor – Maharashtra State Awards, 2010

Nitin Nandan– best director (2) – Maharashtra State Awards, 2010

Nitin Nandan – best director for a film with a rural theme – Maharashtra State Awards, 2010

Cogito Entertainment – best film (2) – Maharashtra State Awards, 2010

Cogito Entertainment – best film with a rural theme – Maharashtra State Awards, 2010

Jhing Chik Jhing has also won awards at other Award Ceremonies. These include

Nitin Nandan – best story – Zee Gaurav, 2010

Bharat Jadhav – best Actor – MaTa Sanman 2010

Chinmay Kambli – best child Actor – MaTa Sanman 2010

Madhavi Juvekar – best actor – Sanskruti Kala Darpan, 2010

Chinmay Kambli – best child actor – Sanskruti Kala Darpan, 2010

== Studio ==
Cogito Entertainment is an Independent Production House, based out of Mumbai. It has made a number of television shows and documentaries. Jhing Chik Jhing is Cogito Entertainment's maiden Feature Film.
