= Manasi Naik =

Indian film actress

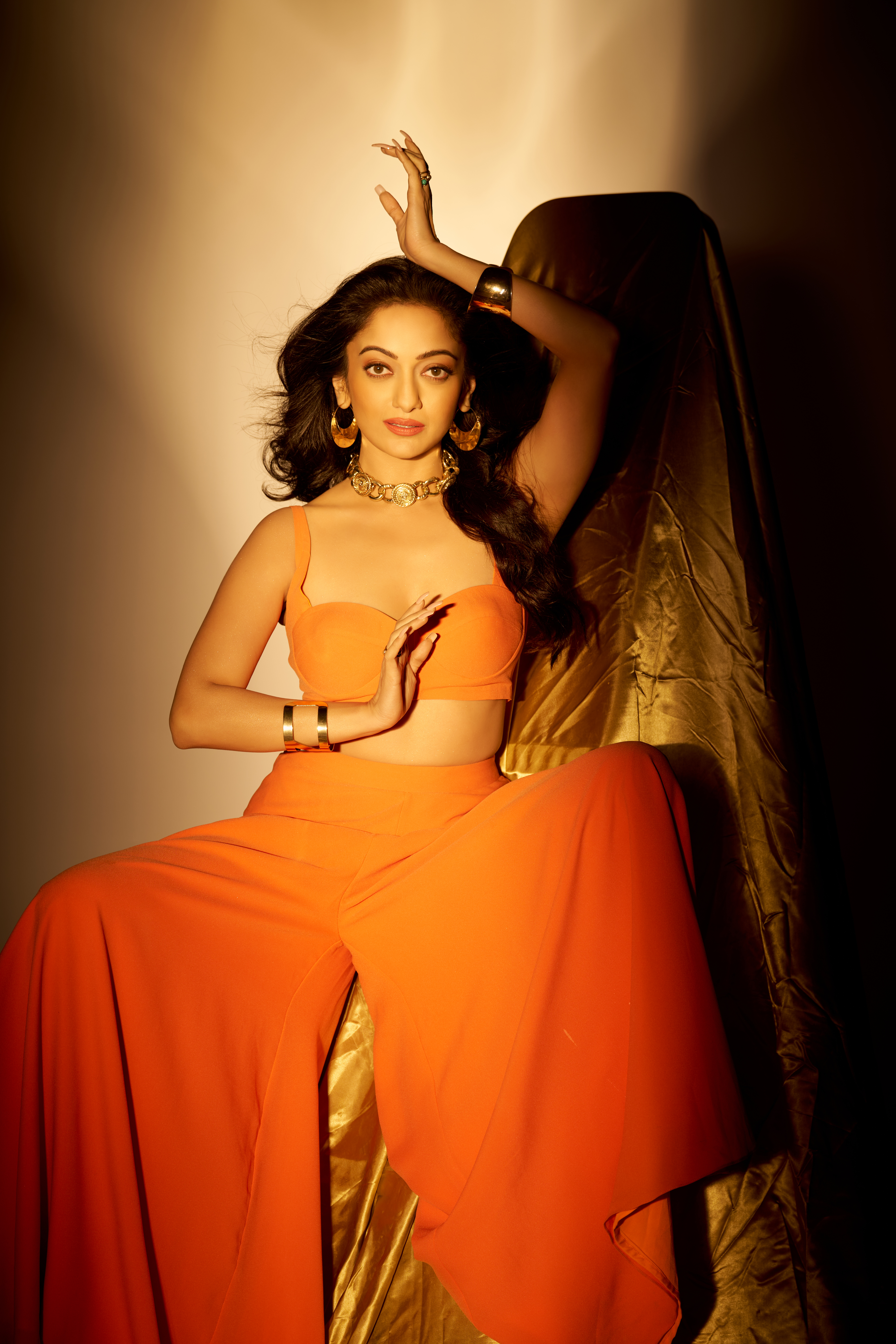
- Naik in 2023
- Born: 3 February 1987 (age 39); Pune, Maharashtra, India
- Occupations: Actress; dancer
- Years active: 2006–present
- Spouse: Pradeep Kharera (m. 2021; div. 2024)

Manasi Naik (born 3 February 1987) is an Indian actress and dancer known for her work in Marathi cinema and television. Raised in Pune, she began her on-screen career in 2006 with a role in the television series Char Divas Sasuche, and made her film debut in 2007 with the commercially successful Zabardast. She rose to prominence dance performances, most notably the item number “Baghtoy Rickshaw Wala” from Teen Bayka Fajiti Aika (2012). Despite success and critical acclaim, Naik experienced periods of fluctuating film opportunities, her leading role in Murder Mestri (2015), earning her the Zee Talkies Comedy Award for Best Actress. She is also known for her performances in HuTuTu (2014), Dholki (2015), and her appearances in popular Marathi item numbers and music videos.

Beyond films, Naik has appeared on television shows such as Chala Hawa Yeu Dya and served as a judge on Dholkichya Talavar Season 4. She was seen portraying 33 iconic roles from Indian cinema in the unreleased Nitin Chandrakant Desai's Bollywood project Jee Lo Apni Filmy Khwaishen. Known for her glamorous screen presence and vibrant dance style, her personal life also drew public attention and therefore remains a recognizable figure in the Marathi entertainment industry.

== Early life ==
Naik was born on 3 February 1987 in Pune, Maharashtra, into a Marathi family with a strong academic background. Her father, Dr. Rajan Naik, is a scientist who worked at the National Chemical Laboratory while her mother, Asha Naik, is a retired senior auditor. As a child, Naik aspired to become a doctor and went on to graduate from Ferguson College. During her college years, she was actively involved in theatre and also began modeling, appearing on several magazine covers. Although she initially dreamed of a medical career, she eventually chose to follow her passion for dance and acting, which led her to relocate to Mumbai.

== Career ==
=== Debut and mainstream success (2006–2014) ===
Naik began her acting career in 2006 with a brief role in the popular Marathi television series Char Divas Sasuche. She made her film debut in 2007 with Zabardast, a Marathi drama directed by Mahesh Kothare, centered around college life and youthful exuberance, was a commercial success. Her performance, particularly her dance sequences, garnered attention and helped establish her as a promising newcomer in Marathi cinema.

In 2009, she appeared as the romantic lead opposite Pushkar Jog in Tukya Tukvila Nagya Nachvila, where their on-screen chemistry received praise from critics. Over the next few years, Naik made notable cameo appearances in dance numbers, such as a pub dancer in the suspense-comedy Target, and a qawwali performer in Mahesh Manjrekar’s action film Fakta Ladh Mhana.

In 2012, she played a supporting role as a Muslim girl in the family drama Kutumb alongside Siddharth Jadhav, which achieved both critical and commercial success. That same year, she gained widespread recognition for her item number “Baghtoy Rickshaw Wala” from the comedy Teen Bayka Fajiti Aika. Though the film received mixed reviews, DNA critic Blessy Chettiar noted, “Mansi Naik’s ‘Vaat Baghtoy Rickshawala’ item song is the only treat, with well-choreographed moves set to the famous Koli folk song.”

Between 2013 and 2014, Naik expanded her filmography with roles in Cappuccino and HuTuTu, both of which were met with positive responses. Despite a successful debut, she received relatively few film offers, a fact she addressed publicly by stating she had “no fear of being labelled as an item girl.” In 2014, she worked in the popular Marathi comedy reality show Chala Hawa Yeu Dya.

=== Career fluctuation and cameo appearances (2015–present) ===
Her first lead role in 2015 was the comedy Murder Mestri, in which she played Hemlata Mestri. The film was both a critical and commercial success, earning her the Zee Talkies Comedy Award for Best Actress. Later that year, she portrayed a seductive character in Vijay Patkar's Carry On Deshpande, though the film was panned by critics and failed at the box office. She followed this with a praised performance in Dholki, with The Times of India’s Mihir Bhanage commenting, “Naik finally gets a role that is a little bigger than a song.” That same year, she played the lead in the suspense-horror film The Shadow, portraying a protective mother who confronts mysterious supernatural events in a farmhouse. This marked the first time she played a mother on screen, moving away from her earlier glamorous image.

In the years that followed, Naik made notable special appearances in dance numbers across films like Police Line Ek Purna Satya, Jalsa, Smile Please and Ekdam Kadak, and also featured in several Marathi music videos She also served as a judge on the dance reality show Dholkichya Talavar Season 4.

Naik was also part of Jee Lo Apni Filmy Khwaishen, a unique project directed by late Nitin Chandrakant Desai, in which she portrayed 33 iconic characters from Indian cinema, both male and female. The film was intended to mark her Bollywood debut, but it remained unreleased.

After a brief hiatus, she returned to the screen in 2025 as the leading lady in the romantic drama Sakaal Tar Hou Dya, opposite Subodh Bhave. The film, featuring only two characters throughout its narrative, tells the story of a broken man whose life takes an unexpected turn after a mysterious prostitute enters his darkest moment. Ashish Ningurkar of My Mahanagar writing, "Through her eyes, her words and her movements, the audience feels the harmony of darkness and hope in her life." Although the film failed commercially, Naik earned the Best Actress Award at the 2026 Ambernath Marathi Chitrapat Mahotsav and Sanskrutik Kaladarpan Awards.

== Personal life ==
Naik was in a relationship with professional boxer Pradeep Kharera for a year before the couple married in a traditional Maharashtrian ceremony in Pune on 19 January 2021. Later that year, they began living separately, and in November 2022, Naik publicly confirmed that she had filed for divorce, citing her mental health and self-respect as key reasons. Their divorce was finalized in February 2024.

In early 2024, speculation about a new relationship emerged after Naik shared photos from Paris with author and space scientist Rahul Khismatrao.

== Filmography ==
=== Films ===
Year	Title	Role	Notes	Ref.
2007	Zabardast	Nupur		
2009	Tukya Tukvila Nagya Nachvila	Nagya's love interest		
2010	Target	Dancer	Cameo appearance in the song "Hawa Hawa"	
2011	Fakta Ladh Mhana	-	Cameo appearance in the song "Tu Manat Tu Spandanat"	
2012	Kutumb	Saira		
2012	Teen Bayka Fajiti Aika	-	Cameo appearance in the song "Baghtoy Rickshaw Wala"	
2013	Kokanastha	Jenny		
2014	Cappuccino	Alifia		
2014	HuTuTu	Priya		
2014	Ekta Ek Power	-	Cameo appearance in the song "Pandhra To Ho Gaya"	
2015	Murder Mestri	Hemlata Mestri		
2015	Carry On Deshpande	Mallaika		
2015	Dholki	Lala's love interest		
2015	The Shadow	Ramaya		
2015	Prem Kahani		Cameo appearance in the song "Ye To Trailor Zakki Hai"	
2016	Mohar	Lavani dancer	Cameo appearance	
2016	Police Line Ek Purna Satya	-	Cameo appearance in the song "Akkha Cinema Pahun Ghe"	
2016	Jalsa	-	Cameo appearance in the song "Bai Wadyavar Ya"	
2017	Bhavishyachi Aishi Taishi	Megha		
2017	Vajra	Lavani dancer		
2018	Jee Lo Apni Filmy Khwaishen	various roles	Unreleased	
2019	Smile Please	-	Cameo appearance in the song "Chal Pudhe Chal Tu"	
2019	Jawani Zindabad		Cameo appearance in the song "Aana Re"	
2020	Tribhanga	Anchor	Cameo appearance	
2022	Tu Fakt Ho Mhan	-	Cameo appearance in the song "Zhingnag Chiknang hotay"	
2022	Ekdam Kadak		Cameo appearance in the song "Madam Kadak Ahe"	
2025	Sakaal Tar Hou Dya	Niyati		
2026	Man Aatle Manatale	Pari		

=== Television ===
Year	Title	Role	Notes	Ref.
2006-2008	Char Divas Sasuche	Priyanka		
2014	Chala Hawa Yeu Dya	Performer		
2016	Dholkichya Talavar	Judge		

=== Music videos ===
- Hello!
- Mast Challay Amcha
- Ramanna
- Mala Lagin Karayichy (2017)
- Gulabi Note (2017)
- Aaplya Love Storycha Hindi Picture (2018)
- Sunday Marketla (2020)
- HudHudi (2021)
- Vatewari Mogra (2021)
- Bai Wadyavar 2.0 (2022)
- Swami Samarth Mauli (2023)
- Rim Zim (2024)

== Accolades ==
- Won: 2015, Zee Talkies Comedy Award for Best Actress – Murder Mestri
- Won: 2016, Sanskruti Kaladarpan Award for Style Icon
- Won: 2023, Sanskruti Kaladarpan Award for Style Icon
- Won: 2026, Ambernath Marathi Chitrapat Mahotsav for Best Actress – Sakaal Tar Hou Dya
- Won: 2026, Sanskrutik Kaladarpan for Best Actress – Sakaal Tar Hou Dya
