= Zabardast (2007 film) =

2007 film by Mahesh Kothare

- Theatrical release poster
- Directed by: Mahesh Kothare
- Screenplay by: Mahesh Kothare; Shekhar Dhavalikar
- Story by: Mahesh Kothare
- Produced by: Suhas Jog
- Starring: Pushkar Jog; Manasi Naik; Sanjay Narvekar; Makarand Anaspure
- Cinematography: Shyam Chavan
- Edited by: Sanjay Dabke
- Music by: Ajay–Atul
- Production company: S.J. Films Productions
- Release date: 18 May 2007
- Running time: 134 minutes
- Country: India
- Language: Marathi
- Box office: ₹10 million

Zabardast (transl. Fantastic) is a 2007 Indian Marathi-language science fiction film directed by Mahesh Kothare and produced by Suhas Jog. It is distributed by Video Palace. It stars Pushkar Jog, Manasi Naik, Sanjay Narvekar and Makarand Anaspure. In addition to writing the story, Mahesh Kothare also wrote the screenplay with Shekhar Dhavalikar.

Zabardast focuses on Pushkar (Pushkar Jog), who discovers a magical jacket that grants wishes when worn. Eager to win over the girl of his dreams, he decides to showcase his affection by joining a dance competition alongside her.

== Plot ==
Once upon a college campus, Professor Kashyap, a wizard of sorts, was dabbling in experiments involving a mystical coat. His guinea pigs? None other than his own students, with Chiplya being his top choice. Now, Chiplya was not only a former student but also the college's go-to choreographer and bosom buddy of Pushkar.

Enter Nupur, a fresh face in the college scene, eager to showcase her dance prowess. Seeing an opportunity to impress her, Pushkar convinced Chiplya, despite his lack of dance skills, to let him join the dance crew. Little did they know, their world was about to get a sprinkle of magic.

On the darker side of campus life, we had Chota Dambis, a local thug, collecting "protection money" for the infamous gangster, Appa Dambis. Now, Professor Kashyap, frustrated by his magical experiments going south, decided to chuck the enchanted coat away.

In a twist of fate, during Pushkar's attempt to dazzle Nupur, he managed to mess up a crucial dance competition. This misstep triggered a pursuit by Sandy and his gang, who were out for some disciplinary action.

In the heat of the chase, Pushkar stumbled upon the forgotten magical coat, and as luck would have it, a lightning bolt brought it back to life. Now armed with wish-granting powers, Pushkar spilled the secret to Chiplya, and the duo hatched a plan to win over Nupur.

However, our story takes a darker turn when Appa and Chota Dambis caught wind of the coat's extraordinary abilities. Their devious minds instantly schemed to exploit its powers for their own malicious purposes. Little did they know, the college campus was about to witness a showdown between the forces of good and the mischievous intentions of those who sought to misuse the magical coat.

== Cast ==
=== Main ===
- Pushkar Jog as Pushkar
- Manasi Naik as Nupur
- Sanjay Narvekar as Chiplya
- Makarand Anaspure as Prof. Kashyap
- Siddhartha Jadhav as Chota Dambis
- Bharat Jadhav as Appa Dambis
- Rasika Joshi as Pushkar's mother
- Aditya Redij as Shantanu (Shanty)
- Yohana Vachhani as Monica

=== Guest appearances ===
- Mahesh Kothare as Prof. Brahmanand Bhardwaj
- Vijay Chavan as Chamya
- Priya Arun as Judge of Jodi Zabardast
- Abhiram Bhadkamkar as Judge of Jodi Zabardast
- Kishori Ambiye as Judge of Jodi Zabardast
- Sunil Tawde as Judge of Jodi Zabardast
- Sanjiv Talpade as Judge of Jodi Zabardast

== Soundtrack ==
Zabardast

Soundtrack album by Ajay-Atul
- Released: April 2007
- Genre: Feature film soundtrack
- Length: 21:30
- Label: Video Palace

Ajay-Atul chronology
Shock (2006)	Zabardast (2007)	Saade Maade Teen (2007)

The film's soundtrack was composed by Ajay-Atul, with lyrics penned by Shrirang Godbole.The film's title theme track was composed by Ajay-Atul.

=== Track list ===
No.	Title	Singer(s)	Length
1	"Aaicha Gho"	Ajay Gogavale, Swapnil Bandodkar	4:15
2	"Zabardast"	Ajay Gogavale	3:13
3	"Zabardast Funda"	Ajay Gogavale	2:42
4	"Hum Aaye Hain"	Swapnil Bandodkar, Amruta Natu	3:57
5	"Ye Na Priye"	Swapnil Bandodkar, Amruta Natu	3:32
6	"Baby Bol Bol"	Ajay Gogavale	3.52
