= Pushkar Shrotri =

Indian actor

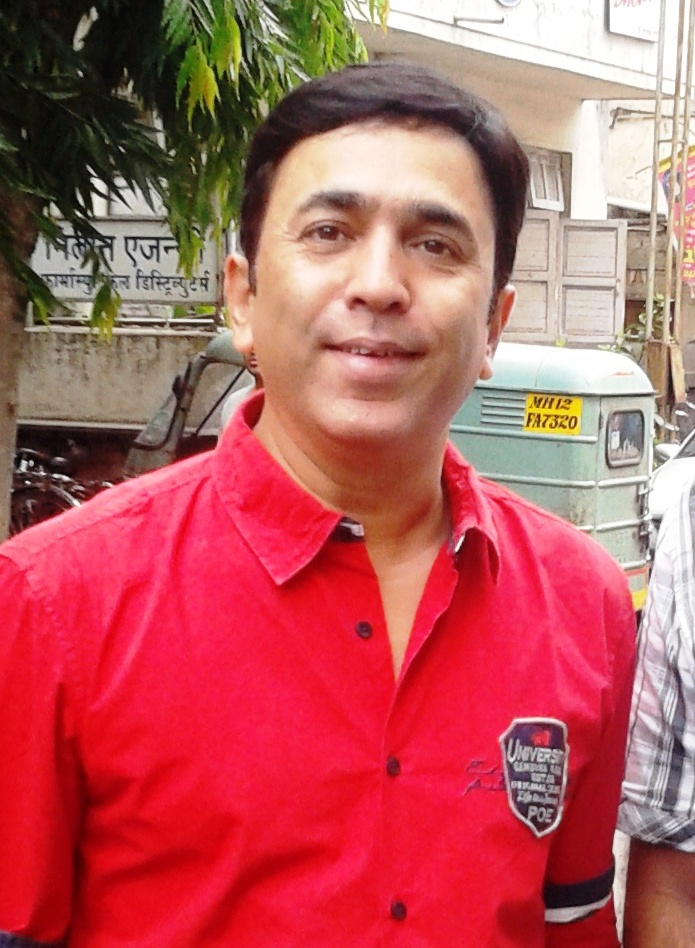
- Pushkar Shrotri in 2012.
- Born: 30 April 1970 (age 56); Mumbai, Maharashtra, India
- Citizenship: Indian
- Education: Graduation (B.Com.)
- Alma mater: Dahanukar College
- Occupations: Actor, Director, Producer

Pushkar Sudhakar Shrotri is a Marathi, Hindi film & theatre actor, producer, and director.

== Early life and education ==
Shrotri was born in Mumbai in 1970. He graduated with a commerce degree from M. L. Dahanukar College in Mumbai.

== Career ==
Pushkar has also acted in a Marathi theater play Hasva Fasvi in which he has played 6 distinctively different character roles.

He has acted in over 25 movies in Hindi and Marathi languages and is particularly known for the comic roles and timing. In 2014 movie Rege, he played the role of real life cop Sachin Waze.

He directed the Marathi film Ubuntu, which was released on 15 September 2017.

== Awards ==
Pushkar has received the 'Favourite Sahayak Abhineta' (Favourite Supporting Actor) award of "Maharashtracha Favourite Kon" (2014) for his role in movie Rege.

== Filmography ==
=== Television ===
| Year | Title | Role | Notes |
|---|---|---|---|
| 2000 | Pimpalpaan | | Alpha TV Marathi |
| 2001 | Hasa Chakat Fu | | Zee Marathi |
| 2002-2005 | Avantika | Avinash Patil | Alpha TV Marathi |
| 2003-2007 | Vadalvaat | Pratap Khandagale | Zee Marathi |
| 2008 | Avaghachi Sansar | Chinmay | Zee Marathi |
| 2012 | Madhali Sutti | Guest | Zee Marathi |
| 2015-2016 | Tumcha Aamcha Same Asta | | Star Pravah |
| 2017-2018 | Hum To Tere Aashiq Hai | Pushkar Gupte | Zee Marathi |
| 2021 | Sun Sasu Sun | | Star Pravah |

=== Films ===
Director
| Year | Title | Notes |
|---|---|---|
| 2009 | Haai Kaai Naay Kaay | Marathi Film directed by Prasad Oak, Pushkar Shrotri |
| 2017 | Ubuntu | Marathi Film directed by Pushkar Shrotri |
| 2025 | Asambhav | Marathi Film directed by Pushkar Shrotri |

Actor
| Year | Title | Role | Notes |
|---|---|---|---|
| 2003 | Munna Bhai M.B.B.S. | Professor in Murli's medical college | Hindi |
| 2005 | Kay Dyache Bola | Advocate Godbole | Marathi |
| 2006 | Lage Raho Munna Bhai | Professor No. 3 | Hindi |
| 2006 | Labad Kuthali | Suresh | Marathi |
| 2006 | Londoncha Jawai | Krishna | |
| 2007 | Zabardast | Unnamed | Marathi |
| 2008 | Ek Daav Dhobi Pachhad | Babu | Marathi |
| 2008 | Sakhi | Sakhi's husband | Marathi |
| 2009 | Anolkhi Hey Ghar Maze | Siddharth Deshmukh | Marathi |
| 2009 | Billu | Rikku, Sahil's Assistant | Hindi |
| 2009 | Jawai Baapu Zindabad | Nandan | Marathi |
| 2009 | Rita | Sangeeta's husband | Marathi |
| 2009 | Hai Kai Nai Kai | Sadashiv Dhapne | |
| 2010 | Bandya aani Baby | Bandya | Marathi |
| 2010 | Haapus | Subhya | Marathi |
| 2010 | Kshanokshani | | Marathi |
| 2010 | Mirch | Kaushal Bhatt | Marathi |
| 2010 | Topi Ghala Re | Pushkar | Marathi |
| 2010 | Zenda | Prashant Sarpotdar | Marathi |
| 2011 | Hip Hip Hurray | Pushki | Marathi |
| 2011 | Morya | Danawade | Marathi |
| 2011 | Zhakaas | Sachin | Marathi |
| 2012 | Badam Rani Gulam Chor | Pustak | Marathi |
| 2012 | Bluffmaster | Deepak | Marathi |
| 2012 | Gola Berij | Antya Kulkarni | Marathi |
| 2012 | Kay Karu N Kasa Karu | | Marathi |
| 2012 | Preet Tujhi Majhi | | Marathi |
| 2014 | Rege | Sachin Waze | Marathi Nominated Filmfare Award for Best Supporting Actor – Marathi |
| 2014 | Sata Lota Pan Sagla Khota | Rokde | Marathi |
| 2014 | Vadhdiwsachya Hardik Shubbhechha | Samar | Marathi |
| 2015 | Balkadu | Nandu Patil (Special appearance) | Marathi |
| 2015 | A Paying Ghost | Gajanan | Marathi |
| 2015 | Katyar Kaljat Ghusali | Banke Bihari, the royal poet | Marathi |
| 2015 | Carry On Deshpande | Shashi Deshpande | Marathi |
| 2016 | Paisa Paisa | Viju | Marathi |
| 2019 | Ye Re Ye Re Paisa 2 | Niraj Shah | Marathi |
| 2022 | Ekda Kaay Zala | Jay | Marathi |
| 2024 | 8 Don 75 | | Marathi |

=== Web Series ===
| Year | Title | Role | Notes |
|---|---|---|---|
| 2026 | Kon Yashwant Pansare? | | Marathi |

=== Drama ===
- Hasva Fasavi
- Suryachi Pille
- A Perfect Murder
- Aaji Bai Jorat
