= Pritam Kagne =

Indian film actress

- Education: Asst. Audiologist & Speech pathologist
- Occupation: Actress
- Years active: 2013—present
- Known for: Award winning film Halal
- Parents: Laxman Kagne (father); Surekha Kagne (mother)
- Relatives: Amol Kagne, brother

Pritam Kagne (born 29 August) is an Indian actress who appears in Bollywood, South Indian films and Marathi movies. Pritam Kagne recently appeared in India Today Magazine.

== Career ==
Kagne made her debut in acting with Malayalam Film Mr Bean in (2013). She debuted in to Marathi films with Navra Maza Bhavra in (2013) And she has also acted in upcoming feature Bollywood film 31st October releasing in 2016.

She has also appeared in Marathi feature film Halal (2015) with director Shivaji Lotan Patil, Chinmay Mandlekar and Priyadarshan Jadhav, produced by Amol Kagne which was screened at the Cannes Film Festival and Goa Film Festival Pune International Film Festival and Godrej Film Festival

== Filmography ==
=== Films ===
Year	Title	Notes
2011	Bokad	Supporting Actress
2013	Mr Bean	Lead role
2013	Navra Majha Bhovra	Lead role
2013	Mile Jab Chora Chori	Lead role
2014	Rangel	Lead role
2014	Rangel	Lead role
2015	Halal	Lead role
2015	Sangharshyatra	Lead role
2015	Bajaar	
2016	31st October	
2016	Aata Majhi Hatli	
2019	Monsoon Football	Lead
2019	Ahilya	Lead
2019	Tujha Majha Arrange Marriage	Lead
2019	Vajavuya Band Baja	Lead
2020	Vijeta	Sunanda Gujjar
2021	Bali	
2021	Tujha Majha Arrange Marriage	Post-production
2024	Khurchi	
2024	Lockdown Lagna	Completed

=== Drama ===
- Ajab Lagnachi Gajab Goshta
- Natsamrat

=== Halal ===
Halal is the first Marathi film produced by Amol Kagne under the Amol Kagne Films banner. The film deals with the theme of loyalty, love and the institution of marriage that is deemed to be pious by society. It is a story of human emotions, which depicts the trials and tribulations that women in our society have gone through. Halal (film) was screened at the Cannes and Goa Film Festivals.
