= Murder of Aditya Sachdeva =

2016 incident where a college student was shot dead

The Aditya Sachdeva murder case refers to a high-profile incident that occurred in Gaya, Bihar, India, on 7 May 2016. Aditya Sachdeva, an 18-year-old college student, was allegedly shot dead by Rocky Yadav during a road rage incident.

== Background ==
Aditya Sachdeva was driving with his friends when his car overtook a sport utility vehicle (SUV) driven by Rocky Yadav, the son of a local politician. This led to an altercation between the two parties, during which Rocky Yadav allegedly shot Aditya Sachdeva, resulting in his death.

== Investigation and legal proceedings ==
Rocky Yadav was arrested shortly after the incident and charged with murder, among other offenses. The case gained significant media attention and public outcry due to the involvement of Rocky Yadav, whose mother, Manorama Devi, was the serving MLC from Janata Dal (United) party.

The case proceeded through the legal system, with hearings and trials taking place over the subsequent years. In September 2017, the Gaya District Court convicted Rocky Yadav of murder and sentenced him to life imprisonment.

== Acquittal by Patna High Court ==
However, on 20 July 2023, the Patna High Court acquitted Rocky Yadav and two other accused individuals due to lack of evidence. This decision was met with controversy and public debate, raising questions about the effectiveness of the investigation and the administration of justice.
