= Waakya =

- Directed by: Deepak Kadam
- Produced by: Deepak Kadam
- Starring: Raj Dutta, Ganesh Yadav, Kishori shahane, Master Panshul Kamod; Priyanka Dnyanlaxmi; Abhijeet Kulkarni; Prema Kiran
- Cinematography: Triloki Caudhary
- Music by: Dev Ashish
- Release date: 13 October 2017

Waakya is a 2017 Indian Marathi-language film. The story focuses on a tribal area in need of education, and was written and directed by Deepak Kadam. It stars Master Panshul Kamod and Priyanka Dnyanlaxmi as the eponymous leads. The film Waakya was chosen out of 280 Films from 35 countries for screening at the Mumbai International Film Festival. The film is expected to be released theatrically .
