= Halal (film) =

2016 film by Shivaji Lotan Patil

- Theatrical release poster
- Directed by: Shivaji Lotan Patil
- Written by: Rajan Khan
- Screenplay by: Nishant Dhapse
- Based on: Halal by Rajan Khan
- Produced by: Amol Kagne; Laxman Kagne
- Starring: Chinmay Mandlekar; Priyadarshan Jadhav; Pritam Kagne; Vijay Chavan; Amol Kagne
- Cinematography: Ramani Ranjan Das
- Edited by: Nilesh Gavand
- Music by: Vijay Gatlewar
- Production company: Amol Kagne Films
- Release dates: January 2016 (PIFF); 6 October 2017
- Running time: 148 Minutes
- Country: India
- Language: Marathi

Halal (Marathi: हलाल) is 2017 Marathi language social drama film, directed by national award-winning director Shivaji Lotan Patil and produced by Amol Kagne, Laxman Kagne under the banner of Amol Kagne Productions. It is their first film, and it deals with the theme of loyalty, love and the institution of marriage that is deemed to be pious by the society. Portraying the family system of Indian Muslims, the film depicts human emotions, and the trials and the tribulations that women in our society go through. The film features Chinmay Mandlekar, Priyadarshan Jadhav, Pritam Kagne and Vijay Chavan in pivotal roles.

Halal was premiered at the Pune International Film Festival 2016. It was also screened at the 2016 Aurangabad International Film Festival. The film was screened at the Cannes Film Festival and at Goa Marathi Film Festival 2016.

The film was theatrically released on 6 October 2017.

== Synopsis ==
Halim is divorced by her husband, but he comes back deciding to remarry her. As per religion Halim has to undergo halala, that she has to marry another man, consummate relationship, divorce him and then marry her first husband. A Maulana offers to do that. Maulana showers her with love and care and she gets confused between staying and leaving the current marriage.

== Cast ==
- Chinmay Mandlekar
- Priyadarshan Jadhav
- Pritam Kagne
- Vijay Chavan
- Amol Kagne
- Chhaya Kadam
- Vimal Mhatre

== Production ==
Amol Kagne and Laxman Kagne produced this movie. Story and dialogues written by Nishant Dhapse, DOP is Ramani Ranjandas, editing by Nilesh Gavand. Music given by Vijay Gatlewar and songs sung by Adarsh Shinde and Vijay Gatlewar.

== Release ==
The official trailer of the film was unveiled by Rajshri Marathi on 14 September 2017.

The film was theatrically released on 6 October 2017.

=== Reception ===
Halal was screened at the Pune International Film Festival, the Yashvantrao Chavan International Film Festival and the Aurangabad International Film Festival. The film has received highly positive reviews from audience, critics & media. Screenplay writer Nishant Dhapse won the "Best Marathi Screenplay Award" at Pune International Film Festival. Halal was also screened at the Cannes Film Festival, scheduled between 11 and 22 May 2016. Halal was also screened at the Goa Film Festival, receiving overwhelming response.There were about 20 films screened during this film festival, including one Konkani film. Halal was screened at the Godrej International Film Festival 2016 on 12 August 2016. Halal was screened at the 47th International Film Festival of India was held during 20 to 28 November 2016 at Goa. Halal was screened at the Delhi International Film Festival 2016 held between 3 and 9 December at Central Park and NDMC Convention Centre, Connaught Place New Delhi. The film is also scheduled to screen at Asian Film Festival.

== Soundtrack ==
Halal

Soundtrack album by Vijay Gatlewar
- Released: 13 September 2017
- Recorded: 2017
- Genre: Feature film soundtrack
- Length: 8:35
- Language: Marathi
- Label: Zee Music Company
External audio
- Audio Jukebox on YouTube

The songs for the film are composed by Vijay Gatlewar and lyrics by Subodh Pawar and Sayed Akhtar.

Track list
No.	Title	Lyrics	Singer(s)	Length
1.	"Maula Maula Mera Maula"	Subodh Pawar and Sayed Akhtar	Adarsha Shinde, Vijay Gatlewar	5:19
2.	"Saiya Mera Saiya"	Subodh Pawar	Vijay Gatlewar	3:16
Total length:				8:35

== Accolades ==
Halal film garnered many awards and nominations in several categories with praise for Shivaji Lotan-Patil's direction, cinematography, production design, costumes, and cast's performances. At the Maharashtra State Film Awards 2016, the film won 6 awards. It was also nominated for Sanskruti Kaladarpan Awards 2016.

Ceremony	Category	Nominee	Result	Ref.
53rd Maharashtra State Film Awards	Best Film in social issue category	Halal	Won	
	Best debut Film Production	Amol Kagne Films	Won	
	Best Social Issue Director	Shivaji Lotan-Patil	Won	
	Best Writer	Rajan Khan	Won	
	Best Background Music	Honey Satamkar	Won	
	Best Lyricist	Sayeed Akhtar	Won	
Sanskruti Kala Darpan Awards 2016	Best Feature Film	Halal	Nominated	
	Best Debut Actor	Pritam Kagne	Nominated	
	Best Writer	Rajan Khan	Nominated	
4th Indian Cine Film Festival-2016	Best Social Film	Halal	Won	
Sahyadri Cine Awards 2016	Best Social Film	Halal	Nominated	
	Best Supporting Actor	Chinmay Mandalekar	Nominated	
	Best Actress	Pritam Kagne	Nominated	
	Best Story	Rajan Khan	Nominated	
	Best Lyricist	Subodh Powar, Sayyad Akhtar	Nominated	
Zee Gaurav 2017	Best Supporting Actor	Priyadarshan Jadhav	Won	
	Best Story	Rajan Khan	Won	

== See also ==
- List of Marathi films
