= Shivaji Lotan Patil =

Indian film director

- Born: 16 April 1970 (age 56)
- Occupations: Director; producer; scriptwriter

Shivaji Lotan Patil is an Indian film director. He received the 60th National Award for Best Director for his Marathi film Dhag.

His film 31st October received positive feedback at its screening at the July 2015 London Indian Film Festival. Shivaji Lotan Patil directed Marathi film Halal produced by Amol Kagne.

== Filmography ==
Year	Film	Actor	Director	Producer	Writer	Language	Notes	Ref(s)
2014	Dhag		Yes			Marathi	60th National Film Awards - National Film Award for Best Direction(Golden Lotus Award)	
2015	31st October		Yes			Hindi		
2017	Chandrabhaga	Yes	Yes			Marathi		
2017	Halal		Yes			Marathi	Maharashtra State Film Award for Best Social Film	
2017	Lafda sadan		Yes			Marathi		
2020	Vajvuya Band Baja		Yes			Marathi		
2021	Bhonga		Yes	Yes	Yes	Marathi	66th National Film Awards - Best Feature Film in Marathi Maharashtra State Film Award for Best Director	
2023	Aatur		Yes			Marathi		
