= List of roles and awards of Subodh Bhave =

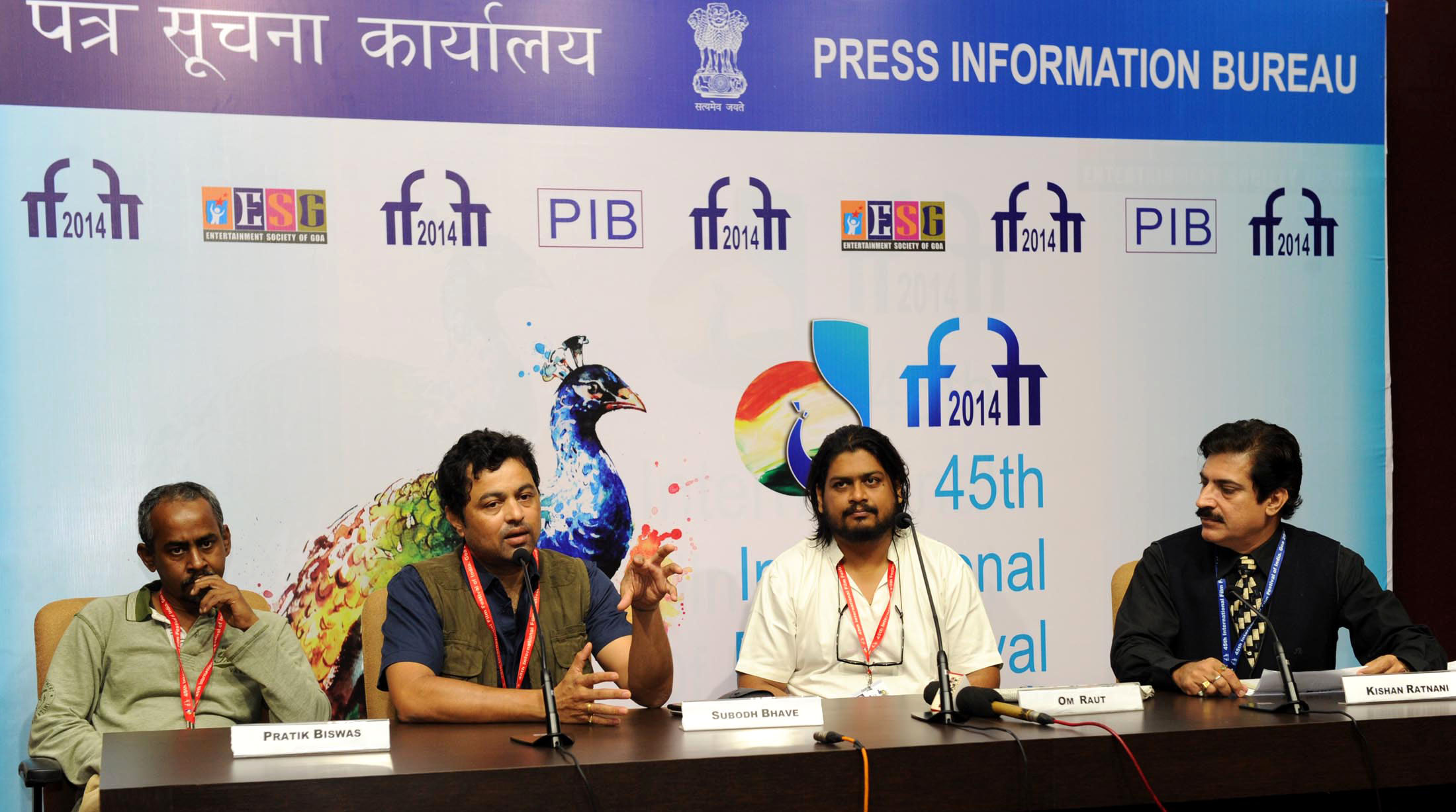
Bhave in 2014 at the 45th International Film Festival of India.

Subodh Bhave is an acclaimed Indian actor, writer, director, and theatre producer, widely regarded as one of the most influential figures in Marathi cinema, television, and theatre. Known for his versatility and dedication to his craft, Bhave has received numerous prestigious awards and nominations across both popular and technical categories. His accolades include five Maharashtra State Film Awards, seven Zee Chitra Gaurav Puraskars, five Zee Marathi Utsav Natyancha Awards, and a Filmfare Marathi Award. He has also been recognized on national and international platforms for his contributions to the performing arts.

Bhave began his artistic journey through theatre, both acting in and directing stage plays, earning early accolades for performances in productions such as Asach Ek Divas, which brought him his first award, and Kalaa Yaa Lagalya Jeeva, which won him seven Best Actor awards, including the State Award’s silver medal. Simultaneously venturing into television and film, he played prominent roles in celebrated series like Geet Ramayan, Damini, and Kavadase, the latter earning his first Zee Chitra Gaurav Puraskar for Best Actor nomination. His roles in Avantika and Vadalvaat gained him two Zee Marathi Utsav Natyancha Awards. His film performances in Aamhi Asu Ladke (2005), Sakhi (2008), Sanai Choughade (2008), Ek Daav Dhobi Pachhad (2009), and Anumati (2013) received critical acclaim, with Aamhi Asu Ladke and Ranbhool (2010) earning several awards at the Maharashtra State Awards, MaTa Sanmaan, and Zee Chitra Gaurav Puraskar. Notably, he also won a Best Playback Singer award for Ranbhool.

Bhave has earned the moniker "Biopic King" for his compelling portrayals in historical dramas such as Balgandharva (2011), Lokmanya: Ek Yugpurush (2015), Ani... Dr. Kashinath Ghanekar (2018), Har Har Mahadev (2022) and Sant Tukaram (2025). His roles in Lokmanya: Ek Yugpurush, Hrudayantar (2017), and Vaalvi (2023) earned him further nominations at the Filmfare Awards. As a director, Bhave made a significant impact with his debut film adaptation of Katyar Kaljat Ghusali, a critical and commercial triumph that won him a Filmfare Award for Best Director, as well as accolades from the International Film Festival of India, Sanskruti Kala Darpan Awards and two Chitra Gaurav Purashkar. His diverse filmography also includes notable works such as Aiyyaa (2012), Touring Talkies (2013), Fugay (2017), Savita Damodar Paranjpe (2018), Phulrani (2023), His Story of Itihaas (2025), along with award-winning television roles in series like Kulvadhu, Tula Pahate Re and Chandra Aahe Sakshila.

== Films ==
Key
†	Denotes films that have not yet been released

Year	Name	Role	Notes	Ref.
2002	Satte Sathi Kahihi	Subya	Marathi debut	
2004	Kavadase	Janardhan		
2004	Mi Tuji Tujhich Re	Rahul		
2005	Aamhi Asu Ladke	Abhijeet Buddhisagar		
2006	Mohatyachi Renuka	Seeta's husband		
2006	Kshan	Nikhil Adhikari		
2006	Aai Shappath..!	Shrirang		
2006	Lalbaugcha Raja	Subodh		
2007	Mission Champion	Mahesh		
2007	Life is Beautiful	Subodh	Documentary film	
2007	Shri Siddhivinayak Mahima	Unnamed	Cameo	
2008	Uladhaal	Guru		
2008	Sakhi	Ravi Desai		
2008	Man Pakharu Pakharu	Nilay Raje		
2008	Majhi Aai	Ramesh		
2008	Sanai Choughade	Rahul Borgaokar		
2009	Tya Ratri Paus Hota	Avinash (Avi)		
2009	Ek Da Kaay Zale Baiko Udali Bhurrr	Kalyan		
2009	Agnidivya	Achyut		
2009	Ek Daav Dhobi Pachhad	Prof Parkhadkar		
2009	Katha Tichya Lagnachi	Shankar		
2010	Kon Aahe Re Tikade	Malhar Shirke		
2010	Ladi Godi	Jitendra (Jeetu)		
2010	Zale Mokale Aakash	Samir Adhikari		
2010	Ti Ratra	Sabnis		
2010	Ranbhool	Lokesh Satam (Abhijeet Deshpande)		
2010	Haapus	Ajit		
2011	Balgandharva	Bal Gandharva		
2011	Paulwaat	Anant Deo		
2011	Morya	Qawali Singer	Special appearance	
2012	Gajrachi Pungi	Chinmay		
2012	Bhartiya	Abhay Sardeshmukh		
2012	Gola Berij	Nanda		
2012	Aiyyaa	Madhav Rajadhyaksha	Hindi debut	
2012	Chintoo	Chintoo's father		
2013	Balak-Palak	Avya		
2013	Chintoo 2: Khajinyachi Chittarkatha	Chintoo's father		
2013	Touring Talkies	Avinash		
2013	Anumati	Shrikant		
2014	A Rainy day	Aniket Pradhan	Marathi and Konkani film	
2014	Postcard	Vishwanath		
2014	Nati	Amit		
2014	Swami Public Ltd.	Nachiket		
2015	Lokmanya: Ek Yugpurush	Bal Gangadhar Tilak		
2015	Aawhan	Madhav Godbole	Delayed release	
2015	Katyar Kaljat Ghusali	Sadashiv Gurav	Also director	
2015	Laathi	Not released	Delayed release	
2016	Bandh Nylon Che	Devdatta Raghunath Jogalekar		
2016	Bho Bho	Vinayak Bhandarkar		
2016	Ardhangini Ek Ardhsatya	Nikhilesh	Hindi film	
2016	Kiran Kulkarni vs Kiran Kulkarni	Kiran Kulkarni		
2016	Pinneyum	Anand Sharma (Purushothaman Nair)	Malayalam debut	
2016	Toh Aani Mee Ek Runanubandh	Subodh Kamat		
2017	Fugay	Hrushikesh (Hrushya) Deshmukh	Also story writer	
2017	Oli Ki Suki		Special appearance	
2017	Karaar	Sunil Mokashi		
2017	Conditions Apply: Ati Lagu	Abhay		
2017	Hrudayantar	Shekhar Joshi		
2017	Ti Ani Itar	Aniruddha Godbole		
2017	Tula Kalnnaar Nahi	Rahul		
2017	Chhand Priticha	Rajaram		
2018	Pushpak Vimaan	Vilas		
2018	Savita Damodar Paranjpe	Sharad Abhyankar		
2018	Shubh Lagna Savdhan	Aniket		
2018	Maza Agadbam	Raiba		
2018	Ani... Dr. Kashinath Ghanekar	Kashinath Ghanekar		
2019	Ek Nirnay... Swatahacha Swatasathi	Ishaan		
2019	Kahi Kshan Premache	Sundar Shinde		
2019	Welcome Home	Rajendra (Raj) Joshi		
2019	Appa Ani Bappa	Vinayak (Bappa)		
2019	Aatpadi Nights	-	Also presenter; Special appearance	
2020	Bhaybheet	Shekhar		
2020	Vijeta	Soumitra Deshmukh		
2020	AB Aani CD	JD	Extended special appearance	
2021	Basta	Inspector Rokade		
2022	Antahakaran	-	Hindi Short film	
2022	Sahela Re	Vikram		
2022	Har Har Mahadev	Chhatrapati Shivaji Maharaj		
2023	Vaalvi	Dr. Anshuman		
2023	Phulrani	Vikram Rajadhyaksha		
2023	Sajini Shinde Ka Viral Video	Suryakant Shinde	Hindi film	
2024	Swatantrya Veer Savarkar	Vinayak Damodar Savarkar	Voice actor	
2024	Alibaba Aani Chalishitale Chor	Parag		
2024	Amhi Jarange	Mr. Bhosale		
2024	Hashtag Tadev Lagnam	Athashree Mahajan		
2024	Paani	Balaji Kendre		
2024	Saltat Reshimgathi	Sahiba		
2024	Gulaabi	Ajay		
2025	Sangeet Manapmaan	Dhairyadhar	Also director	
2025	Devmanus	Inspector Ravi Deshmukh		
2025	His Story of Itihaas	Namit Bharadwaj	Hindi film	
2025	Sant Tukaram	Tukaram	Hindi film	
2025	Better Half Chi Love Story	Ajay Patil		
2025	Sakal Tar Hou Dya	Abhay		
2025	Kairee	Inspector Kamalakar		
2026	Shree Baba Neeb Karori Maharaj	Baba Maharaj	Hindi film	
2026	Bol Bol Rani	Aabhas		
2026	Aali Mothi Shahani	Kiran Borkar		
2027	Fauzi †	Netaji Subhash Chandra Bose		

== Director ==
- Katyar Kaljat Ghusali (2015)
- Sangeet Manapmaan (2025)

== Television ==
Year	Name	Role	Channel	Ref.
1999	Rimzim	Inspector Meghnad	Alpha TV Marathi	
2000	Damini	Kaushal	DD Sahyadri	
2000	Geet Ramayan	Rama	Alpha TV Marathi	
2000	Aabhalmaya	Inspector Mohan	Alpha TV Marathi	
2001	Manachiye Gunti	Doctor Rohan	Doordarshan	
2002-2005	Avantika	Salil Dixit	Alpha TV Marathi	
2002	Bandhan	Ashutosh	Alpha TV Marathi	
2002	Pimpalpan - Story: Zhumbar	Raghav	Alpha TV Marathi	
2002	Nandadeep	Sant Nivrutinath	ETV Marathi	
2002	Akalpit	Inspector Mohan	ETV Marathi	
2002	Akashjhep	Krishnakant Harshe / Raghunandan	ETV Marathi	
2003	Runanubandh	Mangesh Deshmukh	Alpha TV Marathi	
2003-2004	Bedhund Manachya Lahari	Episodic role	ETV Marathi	
2003–2007	Vadalvaat	Jaysingh Rajput	Zee Marathi	
2003–2004	Peshwai	Bajirao	Zee Marathi	
2006	Agnishikha	Unmesh Subhedar	ETV Marathi	
2006	Hya Gojirvanya Gharat	Swapnil	ETV Marathi	
2006-2007	Avaghachi Sansar	Raj Sharangpani	Zee Marathi	
2007	Abhilasha	Phiroz Rangoonwala	Zee Marathi	
2007	Hya Gojirwanya Gharat	Swapnil	ETV Marathi	
2007-2009	Kalat Nakalat	Bhushan	Zee Marathi	
2008-2010	Kulvadhu	Vikramaditya Rajeshirke	Zee Marathi	
2009	Maylek	Shankar	ETV Marathi	
2010	Jhunj	Sangram Shelar	Star Pravah	
2011	Madhu Ethe Ani Chandra Tithe	Episodic role	Zee Marathi	
2014–2016	Ka Re Durava	Avinash Dev	Zee Marathi	
2014	Crime Diary	Anchor	ETV Marathi	
2016	Dholkichya Talavar	Host	Colors Marathi	
2017	Naktichya Lagnala Yaycha Ha	Episodic role	Zee Marathi	
2018	Namune		Sony SAB	
2018-2019	Tula Pahate Re	Vikrant Saranjame / Gajendra Patil	Zee Marathi	
2020	Jai Jai Maharashtra Majha	Host	Sony Marathi	
2020-2021	Chandra Aahe Sakshila	Shridhar Kale	Colors Marathi	
2022	Bus Bai Bas	Host	Zee Marathi	
2024	Mann Suddha Tujha: Season 2	Dr. Salil Desai	ABP Majha	
2024	Tu Bhetashi Navyane	Abhimanyu / Mahi	Sony Marathi	
2025–present	Veen Doghantali Hi Tutena	Samar Rajwade	Zee Marathi	

== Theatre ==
- Chandrapurchya Jangalaat
- Asach Ek Divas
- Kalaa Yaa Lagalya Jeeva
- Maitar
- Safar
- Vahato Hi Durvanchi Judi
- Lekure Udand Zaali
- Yelkot
- Aata De Taali
- Lagnabambaal
- Katyar Kaljat Ghusali
- Dhukyat Haravali vaat
- Sthal Snehamandir
- Ashroonchi Zhali Phule

== Web series ==
Year	Name	Role	Notes	Ref.
2023	Taj: Divided by Blood	Birbal		

== Awards and nominations ==
Award	Year	Category	Work	Result	Ref(s)
Aaryans Sanman	2024	Best Supporting Actor	Alibaba Aani Chalishitale Chor	Nominated	
Ambernath Marathi Film Festival	2026	Best Actor	Sakal Tar Hou Dya	Won	
Chitraleelaniketan	2007	Best Actor	Kalaa Ya Laglyaa Jeeva	Won	
Colors Marathi Awards	2021	Best Villain	Chandra Aahe Sakshila	Won	
Filmfare Marathi Awards	2015	Best Actor	Lokmanya: Ek Yugpurush	Nominated	
Filmfare Marathi Awards	2015	Best Director	Katyar Kaljat Ghusali	Won	
Filmfare Marathi Awards	2017	Best Actor	Hrudayantar	Nominated	
Filmfare Marathi Awards	2024	Best Supporting Actor	Vaalvi	Nominated	
Indradhanu–Yuvonmesh Puraskar	2008	Best Actor	Man Pakharu Pakharu	Won	
International Film Festival of India	2015	ICFT-UNESCO Fellini Award	Katyar Kaljat Ghusali	Won	
International Iconic Awards Marathi	2024	Most Versatile Actor	Vaalvi	Won	
Kala Gaurav Puraskar	2005	Best Actor	Aata De Taali & Kalaa Ya Lagalya Jeeva	Won	
Lokmat Maharashtrian of the Year	2019	Best Actor	Ani... Dr. Kashinath Ghanekar	Won	
MIFTA	2011	Best Actor	Balgandharva	Won	
MaTa Sanmaan	2011	Best Actor	Ranbhool	Won	
Maharashtra State Film Awards	2004	Best Supporting Actor	Mi Tuji Tujhich Re	Nominated	
Maharashtra State Film Awards	2005	Best Actor	Aamhi Asu Ladke	Won	
Maharashtra State Film Awards	2007	Best Actor	Kshan	Nominated	
Maharashtra State Film Awards	2007	Silver Medal	Kalaa Ya Laglyaa Jeeva	Won	
Maharashtra State Film Awards	2008	Best Actor	Sanai Choughade	Nominated	
Maharashtra State Film Awards	2009	Best Actor	Ranbhool	Won	
Maharashtra State Film Awards	2011	Best Actor	Balgandharva	Won	
Maharashtra State Film Awards	2014	Best Actor	Lokmanya: Ek Yugpurush	Won	
Maharashtra State Film Awards	2019	Best Actor	Ani... Dr. Kashinath Ghanekar	Nominated	
Maharashtra State Film Awards	2025	Best Supporting Actor	Har Har Mahadev	Nominated	
Maharashtra State Film Awards	2025	Best Supporting Actor	Alibaba Ani Chalishitale Chor	Nominated	
Maharashtracha Favourite Kon?	2010	Favourite Character	Ek Daav Dhobi Pachhad	Nominated	
Maharashtracha Favourite Kon?	2011	Favourite Actor	Balgandharva	Nominated	
Maharashtracha Favourite Kon?	2013	Favourite Supporting Actor	Anumati	Nominated	
Maharashtracha Favourite Kon?	2016	Favourite Actor	Katyar Kaljat Ghusali	Nominated	
Maharashtracha Favourite Kon?	2016	Favourite Director	Katyar Kaljat Ghusali	Nominated	
Maharashtracha Favourite Kon?	2018	Favourite Actor	Pushpak Vimaan	Won	
Maharashtracha Favourite Kon?	2021	Favourite Actor	Pushpak Vimaan	Nominated	
Maharashtracha Favourite Kon?	2024	Favourite Actor	Vaalvi	Nominated	
Maharashtracha Favourite Kon?	2024	Favourite Actor Critics'	Vaalvi	Nominated	
Mama Warerkar Puraskar	2007	Best Actor	Kalaa Ya Laglyaa Jeeva	Won	
Marathi Natyaparishad Award	2007	Best Couple in Marathi Theatre	Kalaa Ya Laglyaa Jeeva	Won	
New York Indian Film Festival	2011	Best Actor	Balgandharva	Nominated	
Sakal Premier Award	2023	Best Supporting Actor	Vaalvi	Nominated	
Sanskruti Kala Darpan Awards	2016	Best Director	Katyar Kaljat Ghusali	Won	
Sanskruti Kala Darpan Awards	2026	Best Actor	Sakal Tar Hou Dya	Won	
Star Screen Marathi Awards	2007	Best Actor	Mission Champion	Won	
Zee Chitra Gaurav Puraskar	2003	Best Actor	Kavadase	Nominated	
Zee Chitra Gaurav Puraskar	2008	Best Actor	Man Pakharu Pakharu	Won	
Zee Chitra Gaurav Puraskar	2011	Best Actor	Ranbhool	Won	
Zee Chitra Gaurav Puraskar	2011	Best Male Playback Singer	Ranbhool	Won	
Zee Chitra Gaurav Puraskar	2012	Best Actor	Balgandharva	Won	
Zee Chitra Gaurav Puraskar	2016	Best Director	Katyar Kaljat Ghusali	Nominated	
Zee Chitra Gaurav Puraskar	2016	Best Director (Jury)	Katyar Kaljat Ghusali	Won	
Zee Chitra Gaurav Puraskar	2016	Best Supporting Actor	Katyar Kaljat Ghusali	Nominated	
Zee Chitra Gaurav Puraskar	2018	Best Actor	Hrudayantar	Nominated	
Zee Chitra Gaurav Puraskar	2019	Best Actor	Ani... Dr. Kashinath Ghanekar	Nominated	
Zee Chitra Gaurav Puraskar	2020	Best Film	Aatpadi Nights	Won	
Zee Chitra Gaurav Puraskar	2022	Best Actor	Katyar Kaljat Ghusali	Won	
Zee Chitra Gaurav Puraskar	2024	Best Supporting Actor	Vaalvi	Nominated	
Zee Marathi Utsav Natyancha Awards	2004	Best Supporting Character	Avantika	Won	
Zee Marathi Utsav Natyancha Awards	2004	Best Character Male	Avantika	Nominated	
Zee Marathi Utsav Natyancha Awards	2005	Best Character Male	Vadalvaat	Won	
Zee Marathi Utsav Natyancha Awards	2009	Best Couple	Kulvadhu	Won	
Zee Marathi Utsav Natyancha Awards	2009	Best Actor	Kulvadhu	Won	
Zee Marathi Utsav Natyancha Awards	2018	Best Actor	Tula Pahate Re	Won	
