= List of Marathi films of 2020 =

This is a list of Marathi (Indian Marathi-language) films that were released in 2020.

== January - December ==
Opening		Title	Director	Cast	Genre	Ref.
J A N	3	Dhurala	Sameer Vidwans	Ankush Chaudhari, Sai Tamhankar, Sonalee Kulkarni, Siddhartha Jadhav, Amey Wagh, Alka Kubal, Prasad Oak	Drama	
J A N	17	Lata Bhagwan Kare	Naveen Deshaboina	Lata Kare, Bhagwan Kare	Drama	
J A N	24	Miss U Miss	Shyam Nimbalkar	Mohan Joshi, Ashwini Ekbote	Drama	
J A N	31	Kaaal	D. Sandeep	Satish Gejage, Sanket Viswasrao	Horror thriller	
J A N	31	Choricha Mamla	Priyadarshan Jadhav	Jitendra Joshi, Amruta Khanvilkar	Comedy	
F E B	7	Vegali Vaat	Achyut Narayan	Yogesh Soman, Sharad Jadhav, Geetanjali Kulkarni	Drama	
F E B	7	Mhorkya	Amar Bharat Deokar	Raman Deokar and Amar Deokar	Drama	
F E B	14	Vikun Taak	Sameer Patil	Chunky Pandey, Shivraj Waichal	Comedy	
F E B	14	Prawaas	Shashank Udapurkar	Ashok Saraf, Padmini Kolhapure	Drama	
F E B	28	Kesari	Sujay Dahake	Virat Madake, Mahesh Manjrekar	Drama	
F E B	28	Sweety Satarkar	Shabbir Naik	Amruta Deshmukh, Sangram Samel	Comedy	
F E B	28	Bonus	Saurabh Bhave	Gashmeer Mahajani, Pooja Sawant	Drama	
M A R	6	Man Fakira	Mrunmayee Deshpande	Suvrat Joshi, Sayali Sanjeev, Anjali Patil, Ankit Mohan, Renuka Daftardar	Romantic comedy	
M A R	6	Ashleel Udyog Mitra Mandal	Aalok Rajwade	Abhay Mahajan, Parna Pethe	Drama	
M A R	12	Vijeta	Amol Shetge	Subodh Bhave, Pooja Sawant	Sports drama	
M A R	13	AB Aani CD	Milind Lele	Vikram Gokhale, Subodh Bhave	Drama	
M A R	13	Khel Ayushyacha	Prakash Jadhav	Prema Kiran, Surekha Kudchi and Pratiksha Jadhav	Drama	
M A R	20	Neighbours	Vinay Gholap	Chetan Chitnis, Krutika Gaikwad	Drama	
O C T	29	Doctor Doctor	Pritam Sk Patil	Amol Kagne, Prathamesh Parab, Parth Bhalerao, Antara Patil	Comedy	
N O V	20	Bittersweet	Anant Mahadevan	Akshaya Gurav, Suresh Vishwakarma, Anil Nagarkar	Drama	
