= Zee Chitra Gaurav Puraskar for Best Playback Singer – Male =

Zee Chitra Gaurav Puraskar for Best Male Playback Singer
- Awarded for: Best Performance by a Male Playback Singer
- Country: India
- Presented by: Zee Marathi
- First award: Ajay Gogavale, "Morya Morya"; Uladhaal (1998)
- Currently held by: Rahul Deshpande, Amaltash (2025)

The Zee Chitra Gaurav Puraskar for Best Playback Singer - Male is chosen by the jury of Zee Marathi as part of its annual award ceremony for Marathi films, to recognise a male playback singer. Following its inception in 2009.

== Winners and nominees ==
=== 2000s ===
| Year | Photos of winners | Singer | Song | Movie |
|---|---|---|---|---|
| 2008 | | Avadhoot Gupte | "Rani Majhya Malyamandi" | Tula Shikwin Changlach Dhada |
| 2008 | | Shankar Mahadevan | "Chimb Bhijlele" | Bandh Premache |
| 2008 | | Ajay Gogavale | "Aaicha Gho" | Zabardast |
| 2009 | | Ajay Gogavale | "Morya Morya" | Uladhaal |
| 2009 | | Shankar Mahadevan | "Navya Prakashe" | Marmbandh |
| 2009 | | Yadneshwar Limbekar | "Eka Mandirat Eka Pujaryale" | Vavtal |
| 2010 | | Ajay Gogavale | "Khel Mandla" | Natarang |
| 2010 | | Sukhwinder Singh | "O Raaje" | Me Shivajiraje Bhosale Boltoy |
| 2010 | | Dnyaneshwar Meshram | "Vitthala" | Zenda |

=== 2010s ===
| Year | Photos of winners | Singer | Song | Movie |
|---|---|---|---|---|
| 2011 | | Subodh Bhave | "Ranbhool" | Ranbhool |
| 2011 | | Hrishikesh Ranade | "Kadhi Tu" | Mumbai-Pune-Mumbai |
| 2011 | | Ajit Parab | "He Samjun Ghena Ya Babala" | Shikshanachya Aaicha Gho |
| 2012 | | Anand Bhate | "Chinmaya Sakal" | Balgandharva |
| 2012 | | Hrishikesh Ranade | "Kadhi Hasat Khelat" | Paulvat |
| 2012 | | Dayanand Mali | "Deva Tula Shodhu Kutha" | Deool |
| 2013 | | Shekhar Ravjiani | "Haravali Pakhare" | Balak-Palak |
| 2013 | | Suresh Wadkar | "Shabdat Gothale" | Ajintha |
| 2013 | | Aniruddha Joshi | "Vrukshvalli Aamha Soyare" | Tukaram |
| 2014 | | Nandesh Umap | "Khajinyachi Chittarkatha" | Chintoo 2 |
| 2014 | | Swapnil Bandodkar | "Olya Sanjveli" | Premachi Goshta |
| 2014 | | Swapnil Bandodkar | "Na Kale Kadhi" | Jai Maharashtra Dhaba Bhatinda |
| 2015 | | Ajay Gogavale | "Maauli Maauli" | Lai Bhaari |
| 2015 | | Swapnil Bandodkar | "Aikavi Vatate" | Guru Pournima |
| 2015 | | Hrishikesh Ranade | "Baware Prem He" | Baware Prem He |
| 2015 | | Amitraj, Harshvardhan Wavare | "Nave Nave Geet Hai Manache" | Classmates |
| 2015 | | Mangesh Dhakade | "Mani Achanak" | Dusari Goshta |
| 2016 | | Shankar Mahadevan | "Sur Niragas Ho" | Katyar Kaljat Ghusali |
| 2016 | | Hrishikesh Ranade | "Ritya Sarya Disha" | Double Seat |
| 2016 | | Jasraj Joshi | "Kiti Sangaychay" | Double Seat |
| 2016 | | Swapnil Bandodkar | "Savar Re Mana" | Mitwaa |
| 2016 | | Harshvardhan Wavare | "Dhaga Dhaga" | Dagadi Chawl |
| 2017 | | Ajay Gogavale | "Yad Lagla" | Sairat |
| 2017 | | Adarsh Shinde | "Ae Sanam" | Rangaa Patangaa |
| 2017 | | Gaurav Dhagavkar | "Magan Masta" | One Way Ticket |
| 2018 | | Jasraj Joshi | "Muramba" | Muramba |
| 2018 | | Rahul Deshpande | "Apanehi Rang Mein" | Hampi |
| 2018 | | Avadhoot Gupte | "Maze Aai Baba" | Kachcha Limboo |
| 2019 | | Jayateerth Mevundi | "Deh Pandurang" | Pushpak Vimaan |
| 2019 | | Jayas Kumar | "Jau De Na Va" | Naal |
| 2019 | | Nakash Aziz | "Lalya" | Ani... Dr. Kashinath Ghanekar |
| 2020 | | Jasraj Joshi | "Querida Querida" | Girlfriend |
| 2020 | | Hrishikesh Ranade | "Anandghan" | Anandi Gopal |
| 2020 | | Adarsh Shinde | "Tula Japnar Aahe" | Khari Biscuit |

=== 2020s ===
| Year | Photos of winners | Singer | Song | Movie |
|---|---|---|---|---|
| 2021 | | Not Awarded | | |
| 2022 | | Ajay Gogavale | "Yad Lagla" | Sairat |
| 2022 | | No other nominees | | |
| 2023 | | Rahul Deshpande | "Khal Khal Goda" | Godavari |
| 2023 | | Shankar Mahadevan | "Re Kshana" | Ekda Kaay Zala |
| 2023 | | Avadhoot Gupte | "Bhurum Bhurum" | Pandu |
| 2023 | | Rahul Deshpande | "Kaivalya Gaan" | Me Vasantrao |
| 2023 | | Manish Rajgire | "Guru Pournima" | Dharmaveer |
| 2024 | – | Jayesh Khare | "Gau Nako Kisna" | Maharashtra Shahir |
| 2024 | – | Ajay Gogavale | "Paula Thakla Nahi" | Maharashtra Shahir |
| 2024 | – | Ajay Gogavale | "Umgaya Baap" | Baaplyok |
| 2024 | – | Mahesh Kale | "Khara Toh Ekachi Dharma" | Shyamchi Aai |
| 2024 | – | Adarsh Shinde | "Marathi Pori" | Jhimma 2 |
| 2025 | | Rahul Deshpande | – | Amaltash |
| 2025 | | Shankar Mahadevan | "Paani (Title Track)" | Paani |
| 2025 | | Adarsh Shinde | "Naachnara" | Paani |
| 2025 | | Abhay Jodhpurkar | "Navasachi Gauri Mazi" | Gharat Ganpati |
| 2025 | | Mahesh Manjrekar | "Kay Chukle Saang Naa" | Juna Furniture |
