= Chougule =

Chougule is a surname. Notable people with the surname include:

- Deepak Chougule (born 1984), Indian cricketer
- Devendra Chougule (born 1975), Indian actor
- Dnyanraj Chougule, Indian politician
- Sangram Chougule (born 1979), Indian bodybuilder
- Vijay Chougule, Indian politician
