= Itihaas =

Itihaas or Itihas (lit. 'History' in Sanskrit) may refer to:

- Indian epic poetry or Itihasa
- Itihasa-Purana, historical portions of the Brāhmaṇas
- Itihaas (1987 film), a 1987 Indian Hindi-language drama film by Joshiy, starring Raaj Kumar, Shabana Azmi, Anil Kapoor, Rati Agnihotri, Mohnish Behl, Suresh Oberoi and Danny Denzongpa
- Itihaas (TV series), an Indian TV series by Balaji Telefilms (1996–1997)
- Itihaas (1997 film), a 1997 Indian Hindi-language romantic action thriller film by Raj Kanwar, starring Ajay Devgn and Twinkle Khanna
- Itihas (1995 film), a 1995 Indian Assamese-language family drama film by Bhabendra Nath Saikia and starring Nikumoni Barua, Tapan Das and Biju Phukan
- Itihas (2002 film), a 2002 Bangladeshi film
- Ithihasa, 2014 Indian Malayalam-language fantasy comedy film by Binu Sadanandan, starring Anusree and Shine Tom Chacko
- His Story of Itihaas, a 2025 Indian Hindi-language drama film by Manpreet Singh, starring Subodh Bhave, Yogendra Tikku and Ankur Vikal
