= Pramod Ranade =

- Born: Pramod; 1 February 1955 (age 70)
- Genres: playback singing,
- Occupation: Singer
- Instruments: Vocalist, violinist and music arranger
- Years active: 1980–present

Pramod Ranade is an Indian playback singer, violinist and music arranger in Marathi industry.

== Career ==
Ranade started his career as singer and harmonium player and is performing stage shows for Programmes.

== Programs ==
- Mantarlelya Chaitrabanat
- Smaranyatra
- Smarangaani
- Rang Sare Tujhe
- Ranga-Taranga
- Mi Niranjanatil Vaat
- Majhe Jeevan Gaane
- Suvarna-Sangeet
- Geetramayan’.

== Film singing ==
- Tu Tithe Mee
- Murali

== Musical work ==
- Singer, Violinist and provided administrative assistance for the E-TV (Now Colors Marathi) and Alpha Marathi (Now Z Marathi) channel programmes : 'Devachiye Dwari','Jeevan Gane', and 'Sur-Taal'.
- Technical Assistance for Sudhir Moghe's Programme 'Kavita Panopani'
- Singer, Violinist and music arranger for the cable network programme 'Maiboli' in Pune.
- Singer, violinist and music arranger for the programme and audio-video cassettes of 'Mee Niranjanatil Vaat' and 'Amrutachi Godi'
- Contributed as a Violinist for the Audio-Video Project 'Smaranyatra'

== Awards and recognition ==
- Regional Filmfare award for film 'Tu Tithe Mee'

== Personal life ==
Pramod Ranade has son. Hrishikesh Ranade is an Indian playback singer in Marathi film industry. Hrishikesh is married to singer Prajkta Ranade
