= Om Raut =

Indian filmmaker (born 1981)

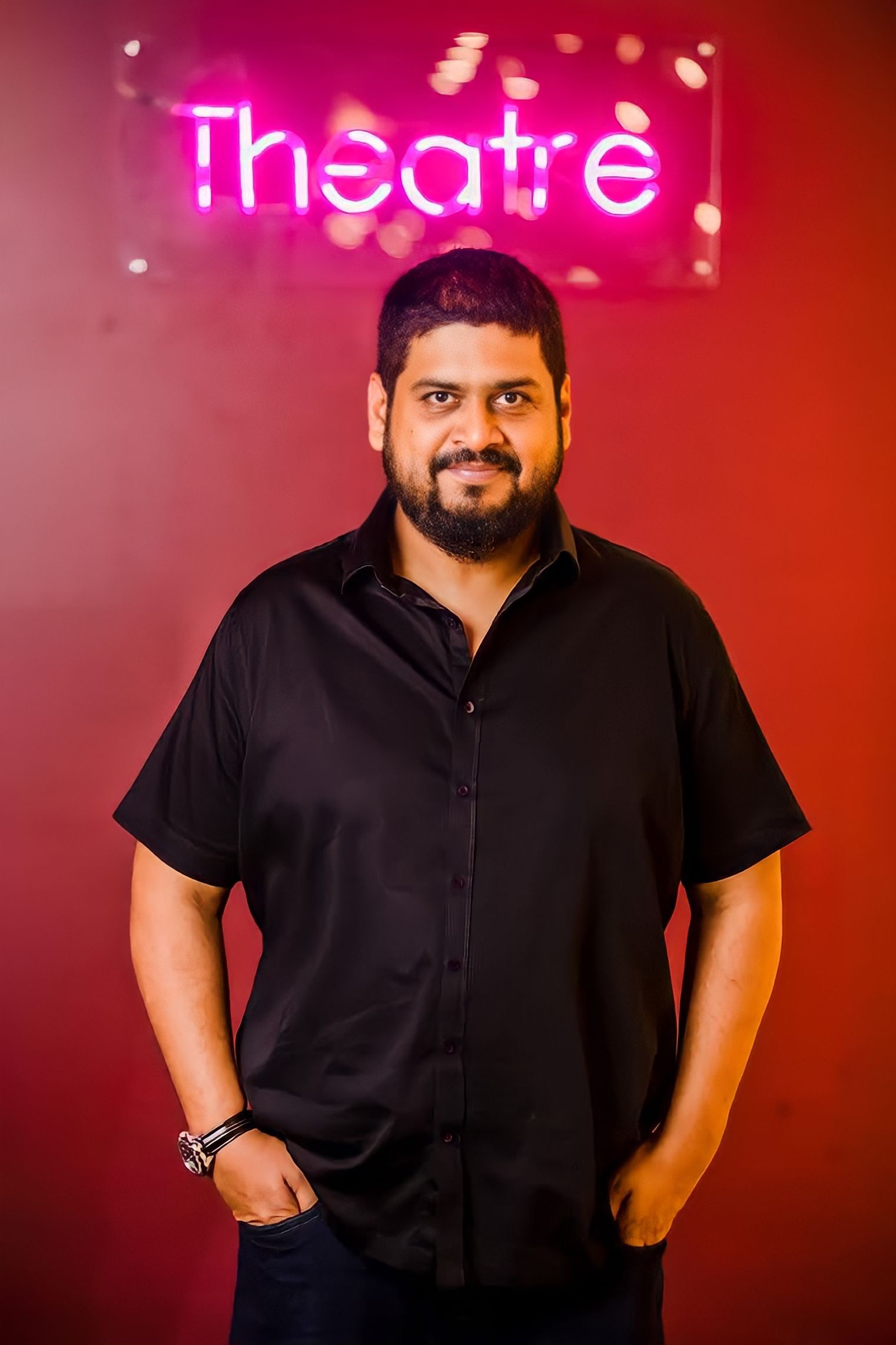
- Raut in 2022
- Born: 21 December 1981 (age 44); Mumbai, Maharashtra, India
- Education: Syracuse University
- Occupations: Film director; Film producer; Screenwriter; former child actor
- Years active: 2011–present

Om Raut (born 21 December 1981) is an Indian film director, writer, former child actor and producer. He has received the 68th National Film Awards for Best Popular Film for the film Tanhaji. He received Maharashtra State Awards for his 2015 film Lokmanya: Ek Yug Purush.

His 2023 film, Adipurush, an adaptation of the Ramayana, starring Prabhas in the title role of Lord Rama, received mostly unfavourable reviews from both the critics and audience, alike. The direction, dialogues, and faithfulness to the source material were deemed not evident. It also got labelled with controversies owing to visual effects and portrayal of Lord Rama, Hanuman and Ravana. The movie has one of the lowest ratings on Rotten tomatoes.

== Early life ==
Om was born in Mumbai to Bharat Kumar and Neena Raut. His mother is a television producer and his father is a senior journalist, well-known author, and successful Rajya Sabha member. Raut's grandfather, J. S. Bandekar, (1925–2017) was a documentary filmmaker and editor.

After working as a child artist in several theatre plays and ad films, Raut's feature film acting debut came with a lead role in Karamati Coat, in 1993.

Raut attended Junior college at D.G. Ruparel college in Matunga and also holds a bachelor's degree in Electronics Engineering from the Shah & Anchor College of Engineering in Mumbai. He joined Syracuse University's College of Visual and Performing Arts in New York State to study film and television.

== Career ==
After completing his education, Raut worked as a writer & director for MTV Network in New York City. He moved back to India and later became the creative head of DAR Motion Pictures, before he produced City of Gold and Haunted – 3D.

Raut's directorial debut was the Marathi film Lokmanya: Ek Yug Purush (2015), the first production of Neena Raut Films, which he had co-founded with his mother. It earned him the Filmfare Award for Best Debut Director. The 2020 Hindi period action film Tanhaji, marked the first Hindi directorial venture of Raut. His latest film is Adipurush starring Prabhas and Saif Ali Khan which released on June 16, 2023. The film received mostly negative reviews from both the critics and audience, alike. The direction, dialogues, and faithfulness to the source material were severely panned. It also generated multiple controversies owing to the subpar visual effects and portrayal of Lord Rama, Hanuman and Ravana. However, it was a major commercial failure.

in May 2025, his next project Kalam: The Missile Man of India was announced at Cannes Film Festival.

== Controversy ==
In 2015, Raut posted on Twitter, "Was God Hanuman Deaf? People around my building think so. Playing loud music like 'really loud' on Hanuman Jayanti. Plus all irrelevant songs". He reportedly deleted the tweet after it went viral. Amid the widespread negative critical and audience response to his 2023 film Adipurush, the tweet resurfaced.

== Filmography ==
Year	Title	Director	Writer	Producer	Actor	Language
2011	Haunted – 3D	No	No	Yes	No	Hindi
2015	Lokmanya: Ek Yugpurush	Yes	Yes	No	No	Marathi
2020	Tanhaji	Yes	Yes	No	No	Hindi
2023	Adipurush	Yes	Yes	Yes	No	Hindi; Telugu
2025	Inspector Zende	No	No	Yes	No	Hindi

== Awards ==
- Filmfare Award 2016: Best Debut Director for Lokmanya: Ek Yug Purush
- 52nd Maharashtra State Awards 2015: Best Director for Lokmanya: Ek Yug Purush
- 66th Filmfare Awards 2021: Best Director for Tanhaji: The Unsung Warrior
- 68th National Film Awards 2022: Best Popular Film for Tanhaji: The Unsung Warrior
