= Tuzech Mi Geet Gaat Aahe =

Indian television series

- Genre: Family drama
- Written by: Chetan Saidane; Anil Deshmukh
- Directed by: Kedar Vaidya
- Starring: See below
- Voices of: Swara Bansode; Swapnil Bandodkar; Hrishikesh Ranade; Saurabh Salunke; Kaushal Inamdar
- Theme music composer: Avdhoot Gupte
- Opening theme: "Tuzech Mi Geet Gaat Aahe" by Aarya Ambekar
- Composers: Nilesh Moharir; Pankaj Padghan; Kaushal Inamdar; Avinash-Vishwajeet; Rohan-Rohan; Chinar-Mahesh
- Country of origin: India
- Original language: Marathi
- No. of episodes: 579

Production
- Producer: Sarita Tejendra Neswankar
- Production locations: Mumbai, Maharashtra
- Camera setup: Multi-camera
- Running time: 22 minutes
- Production company: Trrump Carrd Production

Original release
- Network: Star Pravah
- Release: 2 May 2022 – 16 June 2024

Related
- Potol Kumar Gaanwala

Tuzech Mi Geet Gaat Aahe (transl. I Am Singing Your Song) is an Indian Marathi language television series directed by Kedar Vaidya. It premiered on 2 May 2022 on Star Pravah. It stars Avani Taywade, Abhijeet Khandkekar, Priya Marathe and Urmilla Kanetkar in lead roles.

== Plot ==
Malhar Kamat, a promising singer, falls in love with Vaidehi, a simple village girl. Their secret marriage takes a twist when Malhar is compelled to choose between his passion for music and Vaidehi. Regrettably, he opts for music, abandoning Vaidehi, and later marries the wealthy Monika Rajadhyaksha, unaware of Vaidehi's pregnancy.

Monika gives birth to Pihu, a spoiled youngster, while Vaidehi welcomes Swara into the world. Pihu's behavior contrasts sharply with Swara, who inherits her father's love for music. Vaidehi faces hardship, living with her unsupportive brother Niranjan and sister-in-law Shyamala. Swara, an ardent fan of Malhar, meets him, but tragedy strikes when Vaidehi passes away after a car accident.

Devastated, Swara, dressed up as a boy, reaches Malhar's family, earning their admiration for her musical talent. Vijay and Kshama, Malhar's brother and sister-in-law, decide to adopt Swara. However, Monika exposes Swara's true identity, creating tension. Shyamala, realizing her mistakes, joins the Malhar's city household as a housemaid, earning Swara's recognition and support.

The storyline unfolds with Swara navigating life in this new home, navigating complex relationships, including the evolving dynamic between Swara and Pihu. As Swara and Malhar grow closer, the revelation of their familial connection brings a new layer of complexity. Swara and Pihu's relationship also deepens, creating a compelling narrative of family, music, and intertwined destinies.

== Cast ==
=== Main ===
- Avani Taywade as Swara Kamat – Malhar and Vaidehi's daughter; Monika's step-daughter; Pihu's step-sister
- Abhijeet Khandkekar as Malhar Kamat – A famous musician and singer; Seema's younger son; Vijay's brother; Vaidehi's ex-husband; Monika's husband; Swara's father; Pihu's step-father
- Urmilla Kanetkar as Vaidehi Gattewad Kamat – Niranjan's sister; Manjula's twin sister; Malhar's ex-wife; Swara's mother; Manjula Satarkar (fake identity)
  - Manjula Gattewad - Niranjan's sister; Vaidehi's twin sister (dead)

=== Recurring ===
- Priya Marathe / Tejaswini Lonari as Monika Rajadhyaksha Kamat – Vikram and Eela's daughter; Malhar's wife; Pihu's mother; Swara's step-mother; Shubhankar's ex-girlfriend
- Avanee Joshi as Priya "Pihu" Kamat – Shubhankar and Monika's daughter; Malhar's step-daughter; Swara's step-sister
- Hardeek Joshi as Shubhankar (Sunny) Thakur – Monika's ex-boyfriend; Pihu's father
- Vikram Gokhale as Pandit Mukund Narayan
- Usha Naik as Sagunabai Satarkar - Manjula's adoptive mother
- Sachin Deshpande as Vijay Kamat – Seema's elder son; Malhar's brother; Kshama's husband
- Pallavi Vaidya as Kshama Kamat – Vijay's wife
- Kanchan Gupte as Seema Kamat – Vijay and Malhar's mother; Swara's grandmother; Pihu's step-grandmother
- Umesh Bane as Niranjan Gattewad – Vaidehi and Manjula's brother; Shyamala's husband
- Deepti Joshi as Shyamala Gattewad – Niranjan's wife
- Shailesh Datar as Vikram Rajadhyaksha – Eela's husband; Monika's father; Pihu's grandfather
- Sunila Karambelkar / Shubha Godbole as Eela Rajadhyaksha – Vikram's wife; Monika's mother; Pihu's grandmother
- Dhanashri Bhalekar as Suhani – Monika's friend
- Vanita Kharat as Ranjana
- Abhijeet Kelkar as Sahebrao

== Production ==
=== Casting ===
Abhijeet Khandkekar selected for the role of Malhar Kamat. Urmilla Kanetkar selected for the role of Vaidehi. Avani Taywade made debut role as Swara. Priya Marathe also featured in the series.

== Adaptations ==
| Language | Title | Original release | Network(s) | Last aired | Notes |
|---|---|---|---|---|---|
| Bengali | Potol Kumar Gaanwala পটল কুমার গানওয়ালা | 14 December 2015 | Star Jalsha | 10 September 2017 | Original |
| Malayalam | Vanambadi വാനമ്പാടി | 30 January 2017 | Asianet | 18 September 2020 | Remake |
| Tamil | Mouna Raagam மௌன ராகம் | 24 April 2017 | Star Vijay | 17 March 2023 | Remake |
| Hindi | Kullfi Kumarr Bajewala कुल्फ़ी कुमार बाजेवाला | 19 March 2018 | StarPlus | 7 February 2020 | Remake |
| Marathi | Tuzech Mi Geet Gaat Aahe तुझेच मी गीत गात आहे | 2 May 2022 | Star Pravah | 16 June 2024 | Remake |
| Kannada | Namma Lacchi ನಮ್ಮ ಲಚ್ಚಿ | 6 February 2023 | Star Suvarna | 6 April 2024 | Remake |
