= Taptapadi =

2014 film inspired by Rabindranath Tagore's short story Drustidaan

- तप्तपदि
- Directed by: Sachin Baliram Nagargoje
- Screenplay by: Sachin Baliram Nagargoje
- Produced by: Hemant Bhailal Bhavsar; Sachin Baliram Nagargoje
- Starring: Kashyap Parulekar; Veena Jamkar; Shruti Marathe; Neena Kulkarni; Sharad Ponkshe; Ashwini Ekbote
- Cinematography: Santosh Suvarnakar
- Edited by: Sanjev Gill
- Music by: Sumeet Bellari; Rohit Nagbhide
- Release date: 28 March 2014
- Country: India
- Language: Marathi

Taptapadi is an Indian period film inspired by Rabindranath Tagore's short story Drustidaan. It is directed by Sachin Balram Nagargoje and stars Kashyap Parulekar, Veena Jamkar, Shruti Marathe, Neena Kulkarni, Sharad Ponkshe, Ambarish Deshpande, and Ashwini Ekbote in lead roles. The film was released 28 March 2014.

== Plot ==
Meera falls in love with her cousin and even marries him. Their marital bliss, however, is dampened when she suffers a miscarriage and begins to lose her eyesight.

== Cast ==
- Kashyap Parulekar as Madhav
- Veena Jamkar as Meera
- Shruti Marathe as Sunanda
- Neena Kulkarni as Durgabai
- Sharad Ponkshe
- Ambarish Deshpande
- Ashwini Ekbote

== Critical reception ==
Taptapadi movie received negative reviews from critics. A Reviewer of Loksatta says "Atya, played by Neena Kulkarni, is also a bit emotional. Veena Jamkar's performance is the strength of this film". Soumitra Pote of Maharashtra Times wrote "Overall.. We should expect good movies from this director in future. In the very first film, he has taken up a very heavy and fluid subject. He has a lot to learn from this experience. Not a bad start for him". A Reviewer of Divya Marathi wrote "This is a magnificent failed attempt in Marathi. Veena Jamkar, except for the portrayal skills, there is not much in the film to hold the audience".
