= Hrishikesh Ranade =

Indian playback singer (born 1981)

- Born: Hrishikesh; 18 October 1981 (age 44); Pune, Maharashtra, India
- Genres: playback singing,
- Occupation: Singer
- Instrument: Vocalist
- Years active: 2000–present

Hrishikesh Ranade (born 18 October 1981) is an Indian playback singer in Marathi film industry. He has sung songs in Marathi, Hindi, Konkani and in some other Indian languages. He won Idea Sa Re Ga Ma Pa Maharashtracha Ajacha Awaaj. He is the recipient of Maharashtra State Film Award for Best Male Playback Singer.

== Childhood ==
Hrishikesh is from the music family and his father Pramod Ranade is also a well-known Marathi singer. He took initial training from Pandit Vijay Koparkar and Shekhar Kumbhojkar.

== Career ==
He has made performances in television, and various festivals in the light music and film music. Along with singer Shreya Ghoshal he made a stage performance during the 18th annual day celebration of Airports Authority of India in 2013 and sang some of hit songs. Later in 2013, he accompanied Shreya Ghoshal in UK and Europe tour in which they sang at various places in Europe, as a celebration of 100 years of Bollywood. Both gave a tribute to many legendary playback singers of Bollywood. They had a grand performance at the Royal Albert Hall in Westminster, London. On 17 May 2013 both performed at the Sharjah Cricket Association Stadium in United Arab Emirates.

- He accompanied Shreya Ghoshal in the live concert in Infosys DC Pune on 10 January 2015.
- Shaniwarwada festival
- Mirchi Music Awards Marathi award function

== Film singing ==
He has sung songs in various films. Some of them are -

- Mumbai-Pune-Mumbai
- Tuzya Mazya Sansarala Aani Kay Hava
- Ajintha
- Gadhvacha Lagna
- Premachi Goshta
- Ishq Wala Love
- Cheers Marathe
- Ritya Sarya Disha, Double Seat
- Mumbai-Pune-Mumbai 2
- Online Binline
- Double Seat
- What's Up Lagna
- Kadhi Tu
- Mumbai-Pune-Mumbai 3

== Popular songs ==
- कधी गौर बसंती Kadhi Gaur Basanti
- कधी तू रिमझिम Kadhi Tu Rimzim
- जमेल तेव्हा जमेल त्याने Jamel Tevha Jamel Tyane
- त्या पैलतिरावर मिळेल मजला Tya Pailtiravar Milel Majala
- मनातल्या मनात मी तुझ्या Manatlya Manat Mi Tujhya
- या व्याकुळ संध्यासमयीं Tya Vyakul Sandhya Samayi
- स्वर्ग हा नवा Swarg Ha Nava
- हे तारांगण गूढ गहन He Tarangan Goodh Gahan
- Tu aanI mi - Krutant

== Awards and recognition ==
- 2009: Idea Sa Re Ga Ma Pa Maharashtracha Ajacha Awaaj
- Maharashtra State Film Award for Best Male Playback Singer for song "Tujhya Aathavaniche" from film What's Up Lagna
- Nominated - Filmfare Award for Best Male Playback Singer – Marathi for song "Baavare Prem" He from film Baavare Prem He
- Nominated - Filmfare Award for Best Male Playback Singer – Marathi for song Ritya Saarya Disha from film Double Seat
- Nominated - Filmfare Award for Best Male Playback Singer – Marathi for song "Jara Jara" from film Ti Saddhya Kay Karte
- Nominated - Zee Chitra Gaurav Puraskar for Best Playback Singer – Male for song "Aanandghan" from film Anandi Gopal
- Nominated - Zee Chitra Gaurav Puraskar for Best Playback Singer – Male for song Kadhi tu from film Mumbai-Pune-Mumbai
- Nominated - Zee Chitra Gaurav Puraskar for Best Playback Singer – Male for song Hasat Khelat from film Paulwat
- Nominated - Zee Chitra Gaurav Puraskar for Best Playback Singer – Male for song Baavare Prem He from film Baavare Prem He
- Nominated - Zee Chitra Gaurav Puraskar for Best Playback Singer – Male for song Ritya Saarya Disha from film Double Seat

== Personal life ==
Hrishikesh Ranade is the elder son of Marathi singer Pramod Ranade. He is married to singer Prajakta Joshi- Ranade and has a daughter.
