= Lata Narvekar =

- Born: Lata; 28 July 1940 (age 86); Girgaon
- Occupation: Producer

Lata Narvekar is a popular Marathi drama producer who produced popular plays like 'Sahi Re Sahi', 'Amchyasarkhe Amhich' and 'Lochya Jhala Re'. Lata Narvekar's Chintamani Productions is a premier Marathi theatre production house in Maharashtra.

She has also produced two Marathi films in partnership with her friend Bharati Achrekar – Sarivar Sari and Sakhi.
