= Zee Chitra Gaurav Puraskar for Best Actor =

- Awarded for: Best Performance by an Actor in a Leading Role
- Country: India
- Presented by: Zee Marathi
- First award: Subodh Bhave, Man Pakharu Pakharu (2007)
- Currently held by: Bharat Jadhav, Ata Thambaycha Naay! & Dilip Prabhavalkar, Dashavatar (2026)

The Zee Chitra Gaurav Puraskar for Best Actor is chosen by the viewers of Zee Marathi as part of its annual award ceremony for Marathi films, to recognise a male actor who has delivered an outstanding performance in a leading role.

== List of winners and nominees ==
=== 2000s ===
Year	Photos of winners	Actor	Roles(s)	Film
2008		Subodh Bhave	Nilay Raje	Man Pakharu Pakharu
2008		Ashok Shinde	Shakun	Aevdhese Aabhal
2008		Bharat Jadhav	Ghotale	Bakula Namdeo Ghotale
2008		Sachin Khedekar	Shekhar	Kadachit
2009		Upendra Limaye	Tayyappa	Jogwa
2009		Makarand Anaspure	Makarand Jadhav	De Dhakka
2009		Girish Kulkarni	Kisna	Gabhricha Paus
2009		Avinash Narkar	Avya	Mahasatta
2009		Girish Pardeshi	Jaywant	Marmabandh

=== 2010s ===
Year	Photos of winners	Actor	Roles(s)	Film
2010		Sachin Khedekar	Dinkar Bhosale	Me Shivajiraje Bhosale Boltoy
2010		Atul Kulkarni	Guna Kagalkar	Natarang
2010		Bharat Jadhav	Mauli	Jhing Chik Jhing
2011		Subodh Bhave	Lokesh	Ranbhool
2011		Swapnil Joshi	Gautam	Mumbai-Pune-Mumbai
2011		Bharat Jadhav	Madhukar Rane	Shikshanachya Aaicha Gho
2011		Adinath Kothare	Jagdish (Jaggu)	Ved Laavi Jeeva
2011		Ranjit Agashe	Inspector Chulbul Pandey	Me, Mann Ani Dhruv
2012		Subodh Bhave	Bal Gandharva	Balgandharva
2012		Girish Kulkarni	Keshav Rambhol	Deool
2012		Sachin Khedekar	Shridhar	Taryanche Bait
2012		Chinmay Mandlekar	Parth	Gajaar: Journey of the Soul
2012		Mangesh Desai	Dasu	Khel Mandla
2013		Sachin Khedekar	Hari Dada Damle	Kaksparsh
2013		Jitendra Joshi	Tukaram	Tukaram
2013		Girish Kulkarni	Rewan	Masala
2013		Vikram Gokhale	Ratnakar	Anumati
2013		Tushar Dalvi	Madhav	Shyamche Vadil
2014		Mohan Agashe	Dr. Chakrapani Shastri	Astu
2014		Nana Patekar	Prakash Amte	Dr. Prakash Baba Amte – The Real Hero
2014		Adinath Kothare	Amod	Avatarachi Goshta
2014		Swapnil Joshi	Shreyas Talwalkar	Duniyadari
2015		Riteish Deshmukh	Prince/Mauli	Lai Bhaari
2015		Bharat Jadhav	Chintamani	Chintamani
2015		Atul Kulkarni	Niranjan	Happy Journey
2015		Sachin Khedekar	Jitya Bhau	Shutter
2015		Ankush Chaudhari	Bhurabhai	Por Bazaar
2016		Nana Patekar	Ganpat Belwalkar	Natsamrat
2016		Ankush Chaudhari	Amit Naik	Double Seat
2016		Swapnil Joshi	Shivam Sarang	Mitwaa
2016		Kishor Kadam	Laxman	Partu
2016		Sumeet Raghavan	Vamanrao Ashtaputre	Sandook
2017		Girish Kulkarni	Balasaheb	Jaundya Na Balasaheb
2017		Akash Thosar	Prashant (Parshya) Kale	Sairat
2017		Makarand Anaspure	Jumman	Rangaa Patangaa
2018		Sachin Khedekar	Bhaskar Pandit	Baapjanma
2018		Lalit Prabhakar	Satyaprakash (Satya)	Chi Va Chi Sau Ka
2018		Amey Wagh	Banesh Fene	Faster Fene
2018		Subodh Bhave	Shekhar Joshi	Hrudayantar
2018		Vaibhav Tatwawadi	Alok	Bhetali Tu Punha
2019		Om Bhutkar	Rahul (Rahulya) Patil	Mulshi Pattern
2019		Subodh Bhave	Kashinath Ghanekar	Ani... Dr. Kashinath Ghanekar
2019		Nagraj Manjule	Chaitya's father	Naal
2020		Lalit Prabhakar	Gopalrao Joshi	Anandi Gopal
2020		Amey Wagh	Nachiket Pradhan	Girlfriend
2020		Deepak Dobriyal	Baba	Baba
2020		Bhau Kadam	Baban	Nashibvaan
2020		Pranav Raorane	Vasant Khatmode	Aatpadi Nights

=== 2020s ===
Year	Photos of winners	Actor	Roles(s)	Film
2022		Subodh Bhave	Sadashiv Gurav	Katyar Kaljat Ghusali
2022		Upendra Limaye	Tayappa	Jogwa
2022	No Other Nominees			
2023		Prasad Oak	Anand Dighe	Dharmaveer
2023		Riteish Deshmukh	Satya Jadhav	Ved
2023		Jitendra Joshi	Nishikant Deshmukh	Godavari
2023		Sumeet Raghavan	Kiran	Ekda Kaay Zala
2023		Rahul Deshpande	Vasantrao Deshpande	Me Vasantrao
2024		Shashank Shende	Tatya	Baaplyok
2024		Swapnil Joshi	Aniket	Vaalvi
2024		Ashutosh Gaikwad	Shubham	Unaad
2025		Mahesh Manjrekar	Govind Shridhar Pathak	Juna Furniture
2025		Adinath Kothare	Hanumant Kendre	Paani
2025		Kshitish Date	Rajvardhan (Raja)	Navardev Bsc. Agri
2025		Gashmeer Mahajani	Venkatadhwari Narasimha Shastri	Phullwanti
2025		Shreyas Talpade	Shreeniwas	Hi Anokhi Gaath
2026		Bharat Jadhav	Sakharam Manchekar	Ata Thambaycha Naay!
2026		Dilip Prabhavalkar	Babuli Mestri	Dashavatar
2026		Lalit Prabhakar	Amar Randive	Aarpar
2026		Mahesh Manjrekar	Keshav	Devmanus
2026		Abhinay Berde	Ninad Bhalerao	Uttar
