= Kiran Kulkarni vs Kiran Kulkarni =

- Directed by: Kaanchan Adhikari
- Written by: Ashish Pathre
- Screenplay by: Ashish Pathre
- Produced by: Kaanchan Adhikari; Om Gehlot
- Starring: Subodh Bhave; Kranti Redkar; Aavishkar Darwhekar; Priya Marathe
- Edited by: Anand Diwan
- Music by: Vaishali Samant
- Release date: 15 July 2016
- Country: India
- Language: Marathi

Kiran Kulkarni vs Kiran Kulkarni is an Indian Marathi language film directed by Kaanchan Adhikari. The film stars Subodh Bhave, Kranti Redkar, Aavishkar Darwhekar and Priya Marathe. Music by Vaishali Samant. The film was released on 15 July 2016.

== Synopsis ==
A con artist, Kiran Kulkarni, tries to reap benefits by taking on the identity of a man with the same name as hers, but things do not go down too well for her.

== Cast ==
- Subodh Bhave as Kiran Kulkarni (1)
- Kranti Redkar as Kiran Kulkarni (2)
- Aavishkar Darwhekar
- Priya Marathe
- Mohan Joshi
- Namrata Sambherao
- Madhavi Gogate
- Urmika Godbole

== Soundtrack ==
Kiran Kulkarni vs Kiran Kulkarni

Soundtrack album by Vaishali Samant
- Released: 2016
- Recorded: 2016
- Genre: Feature film soundtrack
- Length: 6:31
- Language: Marathi

Official audio
- Kiran Kulkarni vs Kiran Kulkarni – Full Album on YouTube

Track listing
No.	Title	Singer(s)	Length
1.	"Surya Jhakala"	Jasraj Jayant Joshi	3:50
2.	"Lootla"	Subodh Bhave, Sumeet Raghvan, Sonali Kulkarni, Vaidehi Parashurami, Prajakta Mali, Amruta Khanvilkar	2:41
Total length:			6:31

== Critical reception ==
Kiran Kulkarni vs Kiran Kulkarni movie received mixed reviews from critics. A Reviewer of Divya Marathi gave the film 3 stars out of 5 and wrote "This attempt to draw attention to things that are disappearing from real life seems artificial in some places. Does Kiran Kulkarni catch Janaki aka Bhargavi aka Kasturi? However, one must watch the movie to see the exact colors of life that she shows him". Jaydeep Pathak of Maharashtra Times gave the film 3 stars out of 5 and wrote "the story of two 'I' is told by Kiran Kulkarni vs. Kiran Kulkarni. Ignoring its shortcomings, it manages to pass the time quite well". Mihir Bhanage of The Times of India gave the film 2 stars out of 5 and says"Like its name, 'Kiran Kulkarni v/s Kiran Kulkarni' is a long and tedious watch. If you want to watch it, don't expect anything logical and be ready to face some really lame jokes as well".
