= Bus Bai Bas =

Indian television talk show

- Genre: Talk show
- Directed by: Pratik Kolhe
- Starring: Subodh Bhave
- Country of origin: India
- Original language: Marathi
- No. of episodes: 27

Production
- Executive producer: Sandeep Arjun Kamble
- Camera setup: Multi-camera
- Running time: 45 minutes

Original release
- Network: Zee Marathi
- Release: 29 July – 22 October 2022

Bus Bai Bas (transl. Sit Lady in Bus) is an Indian Marathi language television talk show hosted by actor and filmmaker Subodh Bhave which aired on Zee Marathi.

== Concept ==
The show invited women celebrity guests every week to talk about their personalities, bond, controversies, relations, etc.

== Celebrity guests ==
Episode No.	Guest	Aired date	Notes	Ref.
1	Supriya Sule	29 July 2022		
2	Amruta Khanvilkar	30 July 2022		
3	Amruta Fadnavis	5 August 2022		
4	Medha Manjrekar	6 August 2022		
5	Pankaja Munde	12 August 2022		
6	Pankaja Munde	13 August 2022		
7	Shruti Marathe and Anita Date-Kelkar	14 August 2022	Promotion of Nava Gadi Nava Rajya	
8	Kranti Redkar	19 August 2022		
9	Pooja Sawant	20 August 2022		
10	Hruta Durgule	26 August 2022		
11	Kishori Pednekar	27 August 2022		
12	Surekha Punekar	2 September 2022		
13	Amruta Subhash	3 September 2022		
14	Sai Tamhankar	9 September 2022		
15	Usha Nadkarni	10 September 2022		
16	Shreya Bugde	16 September 2022		
17	Sonalee Kulkarni	17 September 2022		
18	Rinku Rajguru	23 September 2022		
19	Vishakha Subhedar	24 September 2022		
20	Priya Bapat	30 September 2022		
21	Shreegauri Sawant	1 October 2022		
22	Sonali Kulkarni	7 October 2022		
23	Shubhangi Gokhale	8 October 2022		
24	Prarthana Behere	14 October 2022	Promotion of Majhi Tujhi Reshimgath	
25	Prarthana Behere	16 October 2022	Promotion of Majhi Tujhi Reshimgath	
26	Sayali Sanjeev	21 October 2022	Promotion of Har Har Mahadev	
27	Sayali Sanjeev	22 October 2022	Promotion of Har Har Mahadev	
