= Chandra Aahe Sakshila =

2020 Indian TV soap opera

- Genre: Soap opera Drama; Thriller
- Screenplay by: Chinmay Mandlekar; Vinita Ainapure; Dialogues; Tushar Joshi
- Directed by: Raghunandan Barve; Vaibhav Kelkar
- Starring: See below
- Voices of: Bela Shende
- Composer: Devdatta Baji
- Country of origin: India
- Original language: Marathi
- No. of episodes: 138

Production
- Producers: Chinmay Mandlekar; Digpal Lanjekar
- Editors: Pramod Kahar, Vinay Shinde, Sagar shinde
- Running time: 22 Minutes
- Production company: Mulakshar Productions

Original release
- Network: Colors Marathi
- Release: 11 November 2020 – 17 April 2021

Chandra Aahe Sakshila (transl. The moon is witness) is an Indian Marathi language television soap opera which aired on Colors Marathi. It starred Subodh Bhave, Rutuja Bagwe and Nakshatra Medhekar in lead roles. The series is based on the famous Marathi play Kusum Manohar Lele.

== Synopsis ==
It is a story of love, deceit and betrayal. Swati is an educated working woman in her early 30s, who meets a seemingly innocent and naive man named Shridhar and falls love with him. He lures her into traps of a various kinds. Her life is picture perfect until she finds out the truth.

== Plot ==
Swati falls in love with a man named Shridhar Kale and marries him. However, mysterious incidents occur, which seemingly point to Shridhar. It is revealed that Shridhar is already married to a woman named Suman and eloped with her. This displeased their families, who caused Suman to miscarry, and she was no longer capable of bearing children. Obsessed with having a biological child, Shridhar tricked Swati into marrying him and bearing his child. In a series of strange events, Swati is kicked out of the house, and she eventually marries a man named Sangram. Sangram is aghast after discovering that Swati is pregnant with Shridhar's child and kicks her out of the house.

In the climax, Sangram sees through Shridhar's mind games and confronts him. He reveals that he never had any intention of disowning Swati and pretended to banish her from the house to lure Shridhar. In order to ruin Shridhar's marriage with Suman, Sangram convinced Suman that Shridhar had planned her miscarriage. Sangram scolds Shridhar for exploiting Swati to fulfil his selfish desire for a biological child. He also reveals that he was adopted by his parents and reminds Shridhar that there are thousands of orphans in need of a family. Sangram curses Shridhar, saying that although Swati will give birth to Shridhar's child, Shridhar will never be able to claim the child as his. For the rest of his life. Shridhar will never be able to meet his biological child. However, Sangram vows to fulfil his paternal duty towards Swati's child. In the end, Suman reconciles with Shridhar, and the two decide to adopt a child. Shridhar accepts Sangram's punishment and says that if he is fortunate to spend a few moments with his biological child before his death, he will feel exonerated.

== Cast ==
=== Main ===
- Subodh Bhave as Shridhar Kale
- Rutuja Bagwe as Swati Gulwani / Swati Shridhar Kale / Swati Sangram Jagtap
- Nakshatra Medhekar as Suman Shridhar Kale
- Aastad Kale as Sangram Jagtap

=== Recurring ===
- Kunjika Kalwit as Priya
- Uma Sardeshmukh as Uma
- Surekha Kudachi as Meena Atya
- Isha Deshpande as Mumu
- Bipin Surve as Ashwin
- Vinita Kale as Madhavi
- Vaishali Bhosale as Mitali Achrekar
- Hemant Dhome as Nanna
- Yash Pradhan as Dr. Parag Jagtap
- Surabhi Bhave-Damale as Pournima Raikar
- Tushar Joshi

== Production ==
=== Development ===
The show is being under the banner of Mulakshar Productions. It is produced by well known actor and director Chinmay Mandlekar with Digpal Lanjekar.

=== Casting ===
Subodh Bhave was selected to play the role of Shridhar Kale. Rutuja Bagwe grabbed opportunity to play Swati Kale. Vaishali Bhosale comeback television after 3 years to play Mitali Achrekar (Shridhar's sister). Aastad Kale also selected for the role of Sangram Jagtap. Nakshatra Medhekar was selected to play the role of Suman Kale i.e. Shridhar's wife.
