= Priya Marathe =

Indian actress (1987–2025)

- Born: 23 April 1987; Thane, Maharashtra, India
- Died: 31 August 2025 (aged 38); Mira Road, Maharashtra, India
- Other name: Priya Shantanu Moghe
- Occupations: Actor, comedian
- Years active: 2005–2025
- Known for: Ya Sukhano Ya; Tu Tithe Me; Pavitra Rishta; Tuzech Mi Geet Gaat Aahe
- Spouse: Shantanu Moghe (m. 2012)
- Relatives: Subodh Bhave (cousin); Shrikant Moghe (father-in-law)

Priya Marathe (23 April 1987 – 31 August 2025) was an Indian actress, who was best known for her roles in Marathi and Hindi television series like Pavitra Rishta, Ya Sukhano Ya, Tu Tithe Me, and Tuzech Mi Geet Gaat Aahe.

== Career ==
Priya Marathe made her television debut with Ya Sukhano Ya and eventually went on to appear in several other Marathi serials including Char Divas Sasuche. Her first Hindi series appearance was in Kasamh Se where she played Vidya Bali, and eventually appeared in a season of Comedy Circus. She played Varsha in the TV series Pavitra Rishta. She also appeared briefly in Bade Achhe Lagte Hain as Jyoti Malhotra. She also worked in a Marathi serial Tu Tithe Me in a negative role of Priya Mohite. In February 2017, she joined the cast of Saath Nibhaana Saathiya. She played the role of Bhavani Rathod in the show, an evil natured woman who has killed her husband.

She impressed viewers across both Marathi and Hindi television for her adaptability, poise and dedication, building a career that ranged from regional serials to mainstream Hindi shows.

== Personal life ==
Priya Marathe married her longtime friend, actor Shantanu Moghe, son of actor Shrikant Moghe, on 24 April 2012.

== Death ==
On 31 August 2025, Marathe died from cancer at her residence in Mira Road, Maharashtra. She was 38. She made her last television appearance in the Marathi TV series Tu Bhetashi Navyane in 2024.

Her family and colleagues said she had been battling cancer for over two years. Marathe is survived by her husband, actor Shantanu Moghe.

Many co-actors including her cousin and fellow actor Subodh Bhave, Pavitra Rishta co-star Usha Nadkarni, Anurag Sharma, Swati Anand condoled her death.

== Filmography ==
=== Films ===
Year	Title	Role	Note
2008	Humne Jeena Seekh Liya	Rani Joshi	
2011	Dil Toh Baccha Hai Ji	Swati Paranjape	Milind's fresh company at the airport
2017	Ti Ani Itar	Madhavi	

=== Television ===
Year	Title	Channel	Role
2005–2007	Ya Sukhanno Ya	Zee Marathi	Pavani Avinash Adhikari
2007–2011	Char Divas Sasuche	ETV Marathi	Sona Ashok Deshmukh
2008–2009	Kasamh Se	Zee TV	Vidya Bali
2009–2013	Pavitra Rishta	Zee TV	Varsha Satish Deshpande / Jhumri Balan Singh
2010	Comedy Circus Ke SuperStars	Colors TV	Contestant
2011–2012	Uttaran	Colors TV	Ruby
2011	Sasural Simar Ka	Colors TV	Hema
2012	Bade Achhe Lagte Hain	SET	Jyoti Malhotra
2012–2014	Tu Tithe Me	Zee Marathi	Priya Mohite
2014–2015	Bharat Ka Veer Putra – Maharana Pratap	SET	Rani Saubhagaywati
2014–2015	Jayostute	Star Pravah	Pragati Rajwade
2015	Savdhaan India	SET	Sapna / Reshma (Episode 21 – Episode 25)
2015–2016	Bhaage Re Mann	Zindagi	Sneha Awasthi
2017	Saath Nibhaana Saathiya	StarPlus	Bhavani Rathod
2017	Ayushman Bhava	Star Bharat	Sudha Mehra
2017–2020	Swarajyarakshak Sambhaji	Zee Marathi	Godavari
2018	Kaun Hai? – The Spirit Of Kamli	Colors TV	Kavya (Episode 33)
2019	Saath De Tu Mala	Star Pravah	Kanchan
2020–2021	Almost Sufal Sampoorna	Zee Yuva	Iravati
2021	Swarajyajanani Jijamata	Sony Marathi	Raibagan
2021	Yeu Kashi Tashi Me Nandayla	Zee Marathi	Maithili
2022–2023	Tuzech Mi Geet Gaat Aahe	Star Pravah	Monika
2022	Aata Hou De Dhingana	Star Pravah	Contestant
2024	Tu Bhetashi Navyane	Sony Marathi	Ragini

=== Theatre ===
- Kon Mhanta Takka Dila
- A Perfect Murder
- Tila Kahi Sangaychay
