= Bho Bho =

- Directed by: Bharat Gaikwad
- Starring: Prashant Damle; Subodh Bhave; Sharad Ponkshe; Ashwini Ekbote
- Cinematography: Anil Chandel
- Music by: Parth Bharat Thakkar
- Release date: 22 April 2016
- Country: India
- Language: Marathi

Bho Bho is a 2016 Indian Marathi-language film directed by Bharat Gaikwad, the film stars Prashant Damle, Subodh Bhave, Sharad Ponkshe and Ashwini Ekbote. Parth Bharat Thakkar composed the music with cinematography by Anil Chandel. It was released theatrically on 22 April 2016.

== Synopsis ==
After Professor Vinayak's wife is killed, their dog, Sandy, is found guilty. However, the wife's insurance company hires a private detective, Venkatesh Bhonde, to find the truth behind the murder.

== Cast ==
- Prashant Damle
- Subodh Bhave
- Sharad Ponkshe
- Ashwini Ekbote
- Saurabh Gokhale
- Sanjay Mone
- Kishore Chougule
- Anuja Sathe

== Reception ==
=== Critical response ===
A reviewer of Loksatta Wrote "There are many things in the film that are logically flawed. Bhonde's easy entry into Bhandarkar's house, easy stealing of Vikram's mobile and taking away the data from it, sudden appearance of the suit used during the murder to the children playing does not meet the level of logic. Therefore, it would be appropriate to watch 'Bho Bho' from this point of view, a film that tells a different story of dog love against the backdrop of a mysterious fold". Ganesh Matkari from Pune Mirror Says "In spite of the theme being unusual in Marathi films, Bho Bho is extremely predictable as far as the mysteries go, even based on the character types". Saumitra Pote from Maharashtra Times wrote "Overall, the story is the backbone of the film. If only the script and dialogues had been written instead of the straight path and taken a roundabout way, the shock technique would have been more effective". Mihir Bhanage from The Times of India wrote "The film scores brownie points in its concept and the portrayal of cute dogs, but with a more gripping narrative, 'Bho Bho' could’ve been much better".
