= A Rainy Day (2014 film) =

2014 Indian Marathi language film

- Directed by: Rajendra Talak
- Produced by: Priyanka Bidaye Talak
- Starring: Mrinal Kulkarni; Subodh Bhave; Ajinkya Deo
- Cinematography: Sanjay Jadhav
- Edited by: Vidyadhar Pathare
- Music by: Ashok Patki
- Release date: 31 January 2014
- Country: India
- Language: Marathi

A Rainy Day is an Indian Marathi language film directed by Rajendra Talak and produced by Priyanka Bidaye Talak. The film stars Mrinal Kulkarni, Subodh Bhave and Ajinkya Deo. Music by Ashok Patki. The film was released on 31 January 2014.

== Synopsis ==
Successful professional Aniket is willing to go to any length to achieve his dreams. However, things take a turn when his pregnant wife, Mugdha, learns about the ill deeds that he committed in childhood and he is clueless about her source.

== Cast ==
- Mrinal Kulkarni as Mugdha
- Subodh Bhave as Aniket
- Ajinkya Deo
- Kiran Karmarkar as Mr. Rao
- Harsh Chhaya
- Manoj Joshi
- Meenacshi Martins
- Neha Pendse
- Prince Jacob
- Sanjay Mone
- Shaila Kamat
- Sulabha Arya

== Soundtrack ==
A Rainy Day

Soundtrack album by Ashok Patki
- Released: 2014
- Recorded: 2014
- Genre: Feature film soundtrack
- Length: 4:57
- Language: Marathi

Official audio
- A Rainy Day – Full Album on YouTube

Track listing
No.	Title	Singer(s)	Length
1.	"Bhairavi Gau Kashi"	Arati Ankalikar-Tikekar	4:57
Total length:			4:57

== Critical response ==
A Rainy Day film received positive reviews from critics. A Reviewer of The Times of India gave the film 3.5 stars out of 5 and wrote "Although the build up to the climax is well developed, the pace gets affected at a few places. But a gripping story combined with all other well-executed elements of cinema makes the film a worth watch". Swapnil Ghangale of Maharashtra Times wrote "It would have been more fun if things had been resolved logically". A Reviewer of Loksatta wrote "The director has used the rain which is sometimes shimmering and sometimes misty in a very appropriate way". Shubhangi Palve of Zee News wrote "By restraining the unnecessary things in the film, the film leaves an impression on the audience in a mysterious way".
