= Ti Ani Itar =

- Directed by: Govind Nihalani
- Produced by: Prakash Tiwari; Punit Singh; Dayal Nihalani; Dhanajay Singh
- Starring: Subodh Bhave; Sonali Kulkarni; Amruta Subhash; Priya Marathe; Bhushan Pradhan
- Cinematography: Govind Nihalani
- Edited by: Pradip Prabhakar Panchal
- Music by: Vasuda Sharma
- Release date: 21 July 2017
- Country: India
- Language: Marathi

Ti Ani Itar is an Indian Marathi-language film directed by Govind Nihalani. The film starring Subodh Bhave, Sonali Kulkarni, Amruta Subhash, Priya Marathe and Bhushan Pradhan. The film was released on 21 July 2017.

== Synopsis ==
A couple Anirudh and Naina Godbole are stuck in a dilemma whether to tell the world, the police or not about the atrocities happening before their eyes. An album of Naina's ghazals has been released. Since there is a celebration at home, only a few close friends and relatives will come. In it, Naina's brother is a couple and a friend who is a journalist. Everyone starts drinking and this time Naina is urged to sing a ghazal of course and she sings a ghazal. So while she is singing, suddenly a woman's screams are heard from outside and so goes the story.

== Cast and characters ==
- Subodh Bhave as Aniruddh
- Sonali Kulkarni as Naina
- Amruta Subhash as Janaki
- Priya Marathe as Madhavi
- Bhushan Pradhan as Bhaskar
- Ganesh Yadav
- Aavishkar Darvhekar as Mohan

== Soundtrack ==
Ti Ani Itar

Soundtrack album by Vasuda Sharma
- Released: 2017
- Recorded: 2017
- Genre: Feature film soundtrack
- Length: 3:12
- Language: Marathi

Official audio
- Ti Ani Itar – Full Album on YouTube

Track listing
No.	Title	Singer(s)	Length
1.	"Badal jo"	Ankita Joshi, Aditi Paul	3:12
Total length:			3:12

== Critical reception ==
Ti Ani Itar received mixed reviews from critics. Madhura Nerurkar of Loksatta wrote "This movie makes you think introspectively. This is a movie that makes us rethink what we are and what we want to be. This movie is a thought provoking movie for any sensitive person. This movie will definitely be a treat for those who watch a content-rich movie". Suparna Thombare of Cinestaan.com wrote "Ti Ani Itar is flawed, but it will make you think about your own values after you have stepped outside the theatre: how would you react if a crime were to happen right before your eyes? It will also make you ponder over the difference between your thoughts and actions (or the lack of it) when it comes to violence against women". Ibrahim afghan of Maharashtra Times wrote "The film's impact is limited by the fact that the end of the film is a long monologue like a play rather than a visual one, and that too in voice-over form. Acting has all the ready teams, so there is satisfaction on that front". Ganesh Matkari of Pune Mirror says "It will be best if the audience keeps in mind that the choices made by the filmmaker are deliberate, and not accidental or compromised. Having said that, it must also be said that Ti Ani Itar works best as theatre on screen, rather than a complete cinema". Mihir Bhanage of The Times of India says "'Ti Aani Itar' is an unconventional film with a strong message. But it needs to be watched from a different perspective to be understood and not like a regular film".
