= Sant Tukaram (2025 film) =

Indian Hindi-language film

- Theatrical release poster
- Directed by: Aditya Om
- Written by: Aditya Om
- Produced by: B Gautham
- Starring: Subodh Bhave; Sheena Chohan; Arun Govil; Sanjay Mishra
- Cinematography: Madhusudhan Kota
- Edited by: Prakash Jha
- Music by: Nikhil Kamath; Ravi Tripathi; Veeral-Lavan
- Production companies: Curzon Films; Puroshattam Studios
- Release date: 18 July 2025
- Country: India
- Language: Hindi

Sant Tukaram is a 2025 Indian Hindi-language biographical film written and directed by Aditya Om. It is based on 17th century poet Sant Tukaram.

== Plot ==
The film is a biography about the 17th-century poet and well-known religious figure, Sant Tukaram.

== Cast ==
- Subodh Bhave as Sant Tukaram
- Shiva Suryavanshi as Mamba ji
- Sheena Chohan as Avali
- Arun Govil as Lord Vitthal
- Twinkle Kapoor as Bahinabai
- Shwetank Jha as Sawa Ji
- Mannveer Choudharry as Gangadhar Mawal
- Mohdfaraz Khan as Chhatrapati Shivaji Maharaj
- Gauri Shankar as Balhoba
- Akbar Sami
- Shishir Sharma
- Dwaipayan Das
- Brijeshwar Singh
- Mukesh Khanna as Narrator (voice)

== Release ==
The film is released on 18 July 2025.

== Reception ==
Ganesh Aaglave of Firstpost rated 3 stars out of 5 stars and described it as "one of the finest period/historical movies of the year that beautifully showcases the life and journey of the great Sant Tukaram ji Maharaj." Simran Singh of DNA India awarded 3 stars out of 5 stars and praised Subodh Bhave's performance as Sant Tukaram, strong direction, and cinematography, while noted that the film feels slightly stretched with some weak characters and predictable scenes.
