= Lokmanya: Ek Yugpurush =

2015 Indian film by Om Raut

- Theatrical film poster
- Directed by: Om Raut
- Written by: Om Raut; Kaustubh Savarkar
- Produced by: Neena Raut
- Starring: Subodh Bhave; Chinmay Mandlekar; Priya Bapat
- Narrated by: Nana Patekar
- Cinematography: Prasad Bhende
- Edited by: Ashish Mhatre; Apurva Motiwale
- Music by: Ajit-Sameer
- Production company: Neena Raut Films
- Distributed by: Essel Vision Productions
- Release date: 2 January 2015
- Running time: 139 min
- Country: India
- Language: Marathi
- Budget: ₹9 crore
- Box office: ₹13 crore (US$1.4 million)

Lokmanya: Ek Yugpurush is a 2015 Indian Marathi-language biographical film directed by Om Raut and produced by Neena Raut Entertainment. The film is based on the life story of Bal Gangadhar Tilak, a social reformer and the freedom fighter of the Indian independence movement. The film stars Subodh Bhave, Chinmay Mandlekar, and Priya Bapat in pivotal roles. Subodh Bhave plays the title role of Indian nationalist and social reformer Bal Gangadhar Tilak. The film is the directorial debut of Om Raut and is produced by Neena Raut. The screenplay is written by Om Raut and Kaustubh Savarkar and the music is composed by duo Ajit-Sameer.

The film was released on 2 January 2015 and received positive reviews from audience as well as critics.

== Plot ==
The film is a biopic of legendary leader Baal Gangadhar Tilak, respectfully addressed as Lokamanya, meaning "Approved of People", also called "Father of Indian Unrest". The story begins with an ambitious boy making his way into bigger stage of nationalism. Tilak, a man of strong will, runs his newspapers as a mission, and writes books. His speeches thrill and provoke the audiences against British rulers. He suffers imprisonments and writes his own philosophy there. Every day brings him new challenges and he faces them. Every situation looks like an opportunity for his nation, his dream of a powerful Indian state.

== Cast ==
- Subodh Bhave as Bal Gangadhar Tilak
- Shweta Mahadik as Satyabhamabai (wife of Lokmanya Tilak)
- Chinmay Mandlekar as Makarand
- Priya Bapat as Sameera
- Angad Mhaskar as Daji Khare
- Sameer Vidwans as Gopal Ganesh Agarkar
- Prashant Uthale as Damodar Hari Chapekar
- Bharat Dabholakar as British Police Officer Mr. Bruin
- Dipesh Shah as Mahatma Gandhi
- Sahil Koparde as Dharap
- Uma Bapat as Sameer's Mother
- Bharat Dabholkar as Mr. Burns
- J. Brandon Hill as Walter Charles Rand
- Rohit Batwal as Nandargikar
- Ashish Mhatre as Khudiram Bose
- Noel as Lord Curzon
- Marco Bojic as British Officer
- Alex Gabriel as Judge Arthur Strachey
- Swati Chaudhary as Shewanta Bai
- Nana Patekar as Narrator

== Production ==
The filmmakers spent nearly 1.3 crore on visual effects.

== Critical reception ==
The film was praised by audience as well as critics. A reviewer for Divya Marathi wrote "A lot of footage is wasted trying to combine the current state. Nevertheless, it is good to experience this burning embers of popular thoughts on screen". A reviewer for Loksatta wrote "Subodh Bhave has mastered the challenge of portraying the character of Lokmanya Tilak on screen. Chinmoy Mandlekar has played the difficult role of showing how confused Makarand is. The director has got the best support in the departments of costumes, music, background score, acting. Soumitra Pote of Maharashtra Times wrote "In summary, showing such a Himalaya comes out if its surrounding shadows are as strong. However, today Om Raut has met the unimaginable challenge of making a film on popular Tilak in Marathi. It seems that he has worked honestly on this movie". Mihir Bhanage of The Times of India wrote "'Lokmanya – Ek Yugpurush' raises many questions that get you thinking whether we have forgotten the sacrifices that got us freedom and more importantly, are we really free? Probably the power has changed but we are still being ruled and exploited".

== Box office ==
Lokmanya:Ek Yug Purush fared well over the first weekend, collecting ₹2.5 crore (US$270,000). The collections rose to ₹13 crore (US$1.4 million) after 5 weeks, making it one of the highest grossers in Subodh Bhave's career.

== Awards and nominations ==
- Official Selection in Indian Panorama Section at International Film Festival of India (2015)
- Official Selection at 17th London Asian Film Festival (2015)
- 52nd Maharashtra State Awards 2015: Best Film
