= Ashwini Ekbote =

Indian actress and dancer

- Born: Ashwini Katkar; 22 March 1972; Solapur, Maharashtra, India
- Died: 22 October 2016 (aged 44); Pune, Maharashtra, India
- Occupations: Actress, Dancer
- Years active: 2000–2016 (her death)
- Spouse: Pramod Ekbote
- Children: Shubhankar Ekbote

Ashwini Ekbote (22 March 1972 – 22 October 2016) was an Indian theatre and screen actress and a classical dancer. She began her acting career in the Marathi theatre.

== Career ==
Ekbote had done several Marathi plays and had been a part of many regional language based entertainment serials. She made her film debut in 2001 with the movie Akleche Kande and went on to star in Dumkata (2007) and Baavare Prem He (2014). Ashwini was also actively involved in women's empowerment and environmental issues. She ran dance training classes and very often conducted free of charge shows.

== Personal life ==
Ekbote was born as Ashwini Katkar. She was married to Pramod Ekbote, a senior radio technician with 25 years experience working for the Pune Fire Brigade. They had one son together named Shubhankar who is also making a career in the film industry. Shubhankar made his debut with the film Mantr. Ekbote's brother is also a stage and film actor.

== Death ==
Ekbote died on 22 October 2016 after collapsing on stage during a performance in Pune at Bharat Natya Mandir.

== Filmography ==
=== Marathi movies ===
- Mahasatta महासत्ता
- Debu डेबू
- Vacation वेकेशन
- Dankyavar Danka डंक्यावर डंका
- Taptapadi तप्तपदी
- Majha Naav Shivaji माझं नाव शिवाजी
- Bho Bho भो भो
- FU: Friendship Unlimited एफयू: फ्रेंडशिप अनलिमिटेड
- Coffee Ani Barach Kahi कॉफी आणि बरंच काही
- Radio Nights 6.06 रेडिओ नाइटस् ६.०६
- Mahaguru महागुरु
- Baware Prem He बावरे प्रेम हे (2017)
- Aarambh आरंभ
- Kshan Ha Mohacha क्षण हा मोहाचा (2008)
- Bhulwa (2007) as Ria
- Ek Pal Pyaar Ka (Hindi) एक पल प्यार का
- Sant Janabai संत जनाबाई

=== Marathi Plays ===
- Tighanchi Gosht तिघांची गोष्ट
- Eka Kshanat एका क्षणात
- Nandi नांदी

=== Television ===
- Duheri दुहेरी
- Durva दुर्वा
- Radha Hi Bawari राधा ही बावरी
- Tu Bhetshi Navyane तू भेटशी नव्याने
- Ahilyabai Holkar अहिल्याबाई होळकर
- Arundhati अरुंधती
- Unch Majha Zoka उंच माझा झोका
- Asambhav असंभव
- Man Udhan Varyache मन उधाण वाऱ्याचे
- Tujvin Sakhya Re तुजवीण सख्या रे
- Fu Bai Fu फू बाई फू
- Vahinisaheb वहिनीसाहेब
