= Vijeta (2020 film) =

Indian Marathi sports drama film

- Theatrical release poster
- Directed by: Amol Shetge
- Written by: Amol Shetge
- Produced by: Rahul Puri
- Starring: Subodh Bhave; Pooja Sawant
- Cinematography: Udaysingh Mohite
- Edited by: Ashish Mhatre
- Music by: Rohan-Rohan
- Production companies: Subhash Ghai; Mukta Arts
- Release date: 12 March 2020
- Running time: 122 minutes
- Country: India
- Language: Marathi

Vijeta (Winner) is a 2020 Indian Marathi language, sports drama film directed by Amol Shetge and produced by Rahul Puri under the banner of Subhash Ghai's Mukta Arts with Suresh Pai as co-producer. The film starring Subodh Bhave, Sushant Shelar and Pooja Sawant follows the story of a sport coach Soumitra and his athletes teammates, who are all set to win gold for Maharashtra. Subodh encourages them to focus more on their mental strength rather than physical.

In the inaugural ceremony of the 12th Goa Marathi Film Festival in June 2019, the presenter of the film, Subhash Ghai announced the film by unveiling the first look poster. The principal photography began in August 2019. The film was theatrically released on 12 March 2020.

== Cast ==
- Subodh Bhave as Soumitra Deshmukh (mind coach)
- Sushant Shelar as Bhatkal (head coach)
- Pooja Sawant as Nalini Jagtap (Triathlon)
- Pritam Kagne as Sunanda Gujjar (runner)
- Manasi Kulkarni as Varsha Kanbinde (Dean)
- Maadhav Deochake as Rahul Thorat (weight lifter)
- Devendra Chougule
- Tanvi Kishore as Sonia Karnik (Boxer)
- Dipti Dhotre
- Krutika Tulaskar
- Gaurish Shipurkar

== Release ==
The film was released on 12 March 2020.

== Soundtrack ==
Vijeta

Soundtrack album by Rohan Rohan
- Released: 4 March 2020
- Recorded: 2020
- Studio: Ajivasan Studios
- Genre: Feature film soundtrack
- Length: 12:21
- Language: Marathi
- Label: Zee Music Company
- Producer: Avi Lohar
External audio
- Audio Jukebox on YouTube

Soundtrack of the film was composed by Rohan Rohan whereas lyrics were penned by Manndar Cholkar, Amol Shetge and Mandar Satpute

Track listing
No.	Title	Lyrics	Singer(s)	Length
1.	"Vijeta Title Track"	Manndar Cholkar	Avadhoot Gupte	3:54
2.	"Ladh re" (Chorus: Umesh Joshi, Pragati Joshi)	Amol Shetge, Mandar Satpute	Adarsh Shinde, Arohi Mhatre	4:05
3.	"Jinkuya"	Mandar Satpute	Shalmali Kholgade	4:27
Total length:				12:21
