= Alibaba Aani Chalishitale Chor =

Marathi film directed by Aditya Ingale

- Directed by: Aditya Ingale
- Screenplay by: Vivek Bele
- Based on: Alibaba Aani Chalishitale Chor (play)
- Produced by: Nitin Prakash Vaidya; Vaishali Viraj Londhe; Nikhil Varadkar; Sandeep Deshpande
- Starring: Subodh Bhave; Atul Parchure; Neel Deshpande; Umesh Kamat; Mukta Barve; Madhura Welankar; Shruti Marathe
- Cinematography: Amol Salunke
- Edited by: Pravin Jahagirdar
- Music by: Ajit Parab, Agnel Roman
- Production company: Mrudgandh Films LLP
- Distributed by: Nitin Vaidya Productions
- Release date: 29 March 2024
- Running time: 125 minutes
- Country: India
- Language: Marathi

Alibaba Aani Chalishitale Chor (transl. Alibaba and Thieves in their Forties) is an Indian Marathi-language comedy drama film based on a play by the same name. Directed by Aditya Ingale, the film features an ensemble cast of Subodh Bhave, Atul Parchure, Anand Ingale, Umesh Kamat, Mukta Barve, Madhura Welankar Satam and Shruti Marathe. The plot revolves around seven friends who have been together for about 25 years and meet again in their forties.

The film was released on 29 March 2024, with positive reviews.

== Plot ==
There are three married couples and one bachelor who are all friends. Parag works as an executive and his wife, Aditi, is a boutique owner and fashion designer. Sumitra is a homemaker, while her husband works as a radiologist. Varun is a physics professor, and his wife, Shalaka, teaches chemistry. Abhishek is an unmarried artist. They all attend a party at the doctor's farmhouse, but an unexpected event prompts them to leave early. During the party, the lights go out, and everyone hears the sound of a kiss followed by a slap. It becomes clear that someone in their group forcefully kissed someone else, resulting in a slap in return. The story revolves around uncovering who was involved in this incident, exploring various possibilities and scenarios.

== Cast ==
- Subodh Bhave as Parag
- Atul Parchure as Doctor
- Anand Ingale as Varun
- Umesh Kamat as Abhishek
- Mukta Barve as Sumitra
- Madhura Welankar-Satam as Shalaka
- Shruti Marathe as Aditi

== Production ==
The original Marathi play Alibaba Aani Chalishitale Chor was also written by Vivek Bele, although it was directed by Ajit Bhure. Varun is played by actor Anand Ingale, who was also in the original play.

== Soundtrack ==
The music was composed by Ajit Parab and Agnel Roman, while the background score was done by Roman.

Track listing
No.	Title	Lyrics	Music	Singer(s)	Length
1.	"Saala Character"	Vaibhav Joshi	Ajit Parab	Shalmali Kholgade	4:42
Total length:					4:42

== Release and marketing ==
The film was officially announced on 22 February 2024, along with the release date. It was announced with a teaser featuring all the lead actors holding a black board on which their names, crimes, and ages were displayed. The poster was dropped on 28 February 2024, and the artists' weird, inquiring expressions suggest that something is wrong. The teaser was dropped during the second week of March, followed by the first song. On 18 March 2024, the official trailer was released.

After a successful week in theaters, the film was impacted by online piracy as it became available on pirate sites and illicit movie streaming services.

== Reception ==
Kalpesh Raj Kubal of The Times of India rated it 3 out of 5 stars and wrote, "Alibaba Ani Chalishitale Chor promises is an engaging watch. With relatability and humour, the film also touches upon issues like suppressed desires, extramarital affairs, jealousy and more." Keerti Kadam for CineBuster praised the screenplay, dialogue and performance, while saying, "The 'suspense' around the kiss and the slap is built successfully without giving away anything till the climax," giving 3.5 out of 5 stars. Cine Blitz critic Jyothi Venkatesh gave 3 out of 5 stars and noted, "What is interesting about the film is that though it is verbose to a large extent, and extremely dialogue-heavy as it has been adapted from the stage, where visual representations take centre stage, dealing with the way the director has tackled the intertwined relations, midlife crisis etc, the story is as relevant as it was when it was first executed on stage."

== Accolades ==
Year	Award	Category	Nominee (s)	Result	Ref.
2024	Aaryans Sanman	Best Film Critics	Alibaba Aani Chalishitale Chor	Nominated	
2024	Aaryans Sanman	Best Story	Vivek Bele	Won	
2024	Aaryans Sanman	Best Screenplay	Vivek Bele	Nominated	
2024	Aaryans Sanman	Best Dialogue	Vivek Bele	Won	
2024	Aaryans Sanman	Best Supporting Actor	Subodh Bhave, Atul Parchure, Anand Ingale, Umesh Kamat	Nominated	
2024	Aaryans Sanman	Best Sound Designer	Piyush Shah	Won	
2024	Aaryans Sanman	Best Cinematography	Amol Salunke	Nominated	
