= Pinneyum =

2016 film by Adoor Gopalakrishnan

- Theatrical release poster
- Directed by: Adoor Gopalakrishnan
- Written by: Adoor Gopalakrishnan
- Produced by: Adoor Gopalakrishnan; Baby Mathew Somatheeram
- Starring: Dileep; Kavya Madhavan; Vijayaraghavan; Indrans; Subodh Bhave
- Cinematography: M. J. Radhakrishnan
- Edited by: B. Ajithkumar
- Music by: Bijibal
- Distributed by: Kalasangham Films
- Release date: 18 August 2016
- Country: India
- Language: Malayalam

Pinneyum (Malayalam: പിന്നെയും, Once Again) is a 2016 Indian Malayalam-language Biographical crime drama film written, co-produced, and directed by Adoor Gopalakrishnan. Businessman Baby Mathew Somatheeram co-produced the film. The film portrays a love story where Dileep and Kavya Madhavan (in her final acting credit before marriage to Dileep) star in the lead roles. This film was loosely inspired by the murder incident in Kerala during 1984 by Sukumara Kurup, a wanted criminal.

Saibal Chatterjee, eminent film critic, wrote that "Pinneyum is clearly the work of a maestro who has nothing to prove: undemonstrative but staggeringly impactful." The film thus received mixed reviews from critics. This movie was only a moderate success at the box office compared to earlier Adoor films. Nevertheless, it was released simultaneously in around 100 cinema theatres in Kerala and another 30 outside, including five in Mumbai.

== Plot ==
A man, Anand Sharma, is found dead in a hotel room. Then the story changes to Purushothaman Nair, a graduate who has been unemployed for the past eight years, lives with his wife Devi, daughter Revathi, his father-in-law Pappu Pillai, and his sickly brother-in-law Kuttan in Pillai's house. In his free time, Nair enjoys reading detective novels. He gets a call back for a job in the Gulf. From then on, people's attitudes toward him change. He is well respected in his village and freely offers assistance to people who come to him for help, but he begins to become greedy.

In an effort to make more money he devises a plan to fake his death to get insurance money. Along with his father-in-law and Devi's uncle, Nair decides to put a dead body in his car and then burn it to make it appear as though he was burned along with the car. Because the trio cannot find a body, they decide to kill a man and use his body. Driving at night, they come across a man who asks for a ride to the next junction where he could get a cab to take his wife to the hospital for her first delivery. He gets into the front passenger seat. Devi's uncle, sitting behind him, strangles the man to death and the three of them place him in the driver's seat and proceed to burn the car. Everyone (except Devi, to whom Nair had told the whole plan) considers Nair dead, while Nair disappears. Forensic reports, however, soon reveal that the man killed in the car was not Nair but an unidentified person. Police arrest Kuttan, Pillai, and Devi's uncle for questioning, where Kuttan is thrashed. The other two fall into a well-laid trap by the police and confess to having killed the man.

Seventeen years pass, and it is revealed that Kuttan remains bedridden from the thrashing, Pillai refuses to see anyone in jail, Devi's uncle has died in jail, and Nair is still missing. One night, a man comes to Devi's window and calls out to her. When he sees that she is frightened, he reveals that he is Nair. He had undergone plastic surgery to escape from authorities and now lives under the alias Anand Sharma. He claims to have made a lot of money and wants to live elsewhere with Devi and their daughter under a false identity. Frightened and not believing him, Devi threatens to call the police, prompting him to leave. He returns for two more nights. Devi finally confirms that he is her husband, especially after seeing the improvement in the financial life of her sister in law, who was earlier perpetually in debt. She refuses to join him in his new life, however, claiming that he destroyed her and her family's life and does not want to see him again. Her brother had become an invalid, uncle had committed suicide, and her father was unwilling to take parole or even meet them when they visit the jail. Nair returns the next night, tells her that he will not come into her life again, and leaves.

The first scene of the movie continues where the police find a suicide note under Sharma's bed in the hotel room in which he had written, "I have one request. Do not go in search of who I am. I, myself, do not know who I am." This leaves everyone puzzled.

== Cast ==
- Dileep as Purusothaman Nair
- Subodh Bhave as Anand Sharma (Purushothaman Nair after plastic surgery)
- Kavya Madhavan as Devi. Purusothaman Nair's wife
- Nedumudi Venu as Pappu Pillai, Devi's father, and former school teacher.
- Vijayaraghavan as Manikandan Nair, Devi's uncle, and former armyman.
- Akshara Kishor as Revathi. Purusothaman Nair's daughter
- Indrans as Kuttan Pillai
- K. P. A. C. Lalitha, Pappu Pillai's former colleague
- Nandu as Ayyappan Kurup
- Sudheer Karamana as Sub Inspector
- Sathi Premji
- Srinda Ashab as Sharada
- Meera Nallur
- Krishnan Balakrishnan
- Arun Benny as Poovarasan Eetrajavum
- Krishna Prasad as Photographer

== Production ==
Adoor Gopalakrishnan announced Pinneyum after eight years with Dileep in a press meeting on 23 March 2016. Filming started on 11 May 2016 in Sasthamkootta, the main location. Pinneyum was Gopalakrishnan's first digital film.
