= Sakhi (2008 film) =

- Theatrical release poster
- Directed by: Sanjay Surkar
- Produced by: Lata Narvekar; Bharti Achrekar
- Starring: Ashok Saraf; Sonali Kulkarni; Subodh Bhave; Usha Nadkarni
- Music by: Ashok Patki
- Release date: 16 May 2008
- Country: India
- Language: Marathi

Sakhi is a Marathi movie released on 16 May 2008. Produced by Lata Narvekar along with Bharti Achrekar and, directed by Sanjay Surkar.

== Cast ==
The cast includes

- Ashok Saraf as Suryankant Jagdale
- Sonali Kulkarni as Nishi Surve
- Subodh Bhave as Ravi Desai
- Usha Nadkarni as Kunda Tai & others

== Soundtrack ==
The music is provided by Ashok Patki.
