= Devendra Chougule =

Indian actor

Devendra Baburao Chougule
- Born: Kolhapur
- Occupation: Actor
- Years active: 2000–present
- Notable work: Sambha; Welcome to Jungle
- Website: devendrachougule.com

Devendra Chougule is a Marathi actor, who has acted in numerous Marathi dramas, movies and television serials for over 9 years. He has been associated with Marathi Theatre since 2000 and till date has performed in 6 different plays and variety of roles. In the journey of 9 years of performing arts, he has been honoured with many prestigious awards. Till date he has received Vocational Award from RCO Kolhapur Heritage in his name. He has also performed in 2 Marathi Feature Films and 4 Marathi serials.

== His Work ==
After the first few stage performances during his school years and college years he got an opportunity to act in the Marathi play named "Somwar Ka Yeto". That proved to be a major breakthrough for him and thus he ventured into the commercial Marathi theater. He proved his excellence in comedy. Then followed the play "Manubhai cha bhacha". He got his first break into films through the film "Sambha — Ajcha Chava" by director Mr. Sanjay Todkar and thus marked his first entry into the world of Marathi films, where his performance and name reached to a larger audience, further stabilising his presence in the acting arena.

Having done a numerous Marathi shows, Devendra has also worked in the film media. He has worked in television serials and Marathi films. He has worked in some of the all-time famous movies like — PASANT AAHE MULAGA, MADHUCHANDRACHI RATRA, WAAJVA RE WAAJVA, SAMBHA, WELCOME TO THE JUNGLE, PREMAAY NAMAHA and most recent 'Vijeta' movie by Subhash Ghai.

== Personal ==
Devendra is Kolhapur City-based Marathi actor-filmmaker-Businessman, who is seen in the sci-fi Marathi film, Welcome To Jungle, says that more opportunities should be given to talent from Kolhapur according to him

"It's a city that has given many gems to the film industry. The youth here is very talented. But people lack a proper platform. The city used to have two studios but they don't exist now. Thus the basic requirements for shooting a film cannot be met and hence we have to travel to Pune or Mumbai for the editing and post-production process. I wish the city administration takes some effort to put up a studio in Kolhapur which will then give a boost to the local talent," he says.

Devendra says that his passion for acting and films helps him experiment with projects. "Acting is my passion and hobby. Till my graduation, I was never into it. I was always drawn to acting but never dared to take it up nor did I get a proper platform to showcase my talent," he says. His first film Sambha- Aajcha Chava didn't do that well at the BO last year. "But at least we tried doing something different," he says, adding, "Even in Welcome To Jungle, we have endeavoured to give something new to the audiences. This conscious effort by filmmakers has resulted in innovative film experiments."
