= Subodh Bhave =

Indian actor and filmmaker (born 1975)

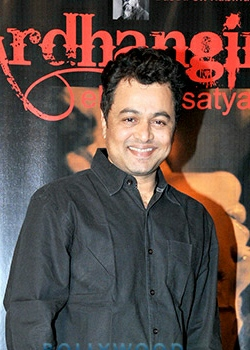
- Bhave in 2016
- Born: 9 November 1975 (age 50); Pune, Maharashtra, India
- Other name: Subodh Suresh Bhave
- Occupations: Actor; director; producer
- Years active: 1997–present
- Works: Full list
- Spouse: Manjiri Deshpande (m. 2001)
- Children: 2
- Relatives: Priya Marathe (cousin)
- Awards: Full list
- Website: subodhbhave.com

Subodh Bhave (pronounced [sʊboːd̪ʱ bʱaːʋeː]; born 9 November 1975) is an Indian actor, writer, director and theatre producer who works in Marathi cinema, television, and theatre. He is the recipient of numerous awards, including five Maharashtra State Film Awards, eight Zee Chitra Gaurav Puraskar, a Filmfare Award Marathi and Maharashtracha Favourite Kon Award.

Bhave’s journey began in the late 1990s with a series of acclaimed theatre productions, after which he transitioned to television in 2000 and gained recognition for his portrayal of a mythological character in GeetRamayan, followed by notable roles in Avantika, Vadalvaat and Kulvadhu. He made his feature-film debut in 2002, but it was roles in Kavadase (2004) and Aamhi Asu Ladke (2005) that first garnered critical notice, the latter earning him a State Film Awards. Over the years, he gained prominence with standout performances in films such Man Pakharu Pakharu (2008), Ranbhool (2010),Anumati (2013), Fugay (2017) and Hrudayantar (2017). He earned widespread acclaim for his portrayals of iconic personalities, including Bal Gandharva in Balgandharva (2011), Bal Gangadhar Tilak in Lokmanya: Ek Yugpurush (2015), Kashinath Ghanekar in Ani... Dr. Kashinath Ghanekar (2018) and Chhatrapati Shivaji Maharaj in Har Har Mahadev (2022). He made a successful directorial debut with Katyar Kaljat Ghusali (2015), a musical drama that became one of the highest-grossing Marathi films and earned him the Filmfare Award for Best Director.

Subsequent notable projects include Sakhi (2008), Kiran Kulkarni VS Kiran Kulkarni (2016), Ti Ani Itar (2017), Pushpak Vimaan (2018), Vijeta (2020), Vaalvi (2023) and Hashtag Tadev Lagnam (2024).Beyond Marathi, Bhave has also appeared in Hindi and Malayalam films such as Aiyyaa (2012), Pinneyum (2016), His Story of Itihaas (2025) and Sant Tukaram (2025). On television, he starred in popular dramas like Tula Pahate Re and Chandra Aahe Sakshila, and hosted the talk show Bus Bai Bas: Ladies Special. In theatre, he directed a revival of Katyar Kaljat Ghusali in 2010 and played the iconic role of Lalya in Ashroonchi Zhali Phule in 2019.

== Early life and family ==
Bhave was born on 9 November 1975 in Pune, Maharashtra, to Suresh Bhave and Snehal Bhave. He completed primary and secondary schooling at Nutan Marathi Vidyalaya in Pune, where he also pursued athletic interests such as Mallakhamba, gymnastics, and swimming. After failing three subjects in his 12th-grade board examinations, a setback that he later credited with driving him toward his passion for acting. He graduated with both a Bachelor of Commerce and a Master of Commerce from Symbiosis College, Pune. During his postgraduate studies, Bhave worked as a salesman at Inika Technologies, an IT company in Koregaon Park, before transitioning full-time into theatre and film.

== Career ==
=== Early career and rise in theatre and television (late 1990s–2005) ===
Bhave left his job in Pune to pursue his passion for acting and began performing in theatre in the late 1990s. He actively participated in prestigious competitions such as Purushottam Karandak and Firodiya Karandak, where he won several awards for his performances. His breakthrough came with the experimental play Chandrapurchya Jangalaat, which earned him widespread recognition in the theatre circuit, while his role in Asach Ek Divas earned him his first important acting award. Over these early years, Bhave acted in and directed several plays such as Maitar, Kalaa Yaa Lagalya Jeeva, with the latter winning him seven Best Actor awards. Other noteworthy plays from this period included Lekure Udand Zaali by Vasant Kanetkar, Aata De Taali by Milind Gadgil, and Yelkot by Sham Manohar.

Bhave’s screen journey began with supporting roles in the television shows like Rimzim (1999), where he portrayed an inspector, and in Damini (2000), one of the first Marathi daily soaps. His major breakthrough on TV came in 2000 with GeetRamayan on Alpha TV Marathi, in which he portrayed Shri Ram, the central character of the Hindu epic Ramayana. He went on to appear in several prominent television productions, including Avantika (2002-2005), Vadalvaat (2003-2007) and Peshwai (2003-2005) all of which aired on Zee Marathi. His performances in Avantika and Vadalvaat were especially praised, earning him the Best Supporting Character and Best Character Male awards at the Zee Marathi Utsav Natyancha Awards in 2004 and 2005.

In films, Bhave made his debut in 2002 with Ravindra Mahajani's Satte Sathi Kahihi. He received his first Zee Gaurav Puraskar Best Actor nomination for Kavadase (2004), which was based on a novel by Jaywant Dalvi. However, it was Aamhi Asu Ladke (2005), directed by Abhiram Bhadkamkar, that marked his most notable early film role. In this film, Bhave played an artist who becomes a teacher for special children and, through their world, discovers the real meaning of life, a performance that won him the Maharashtra State Film Award for Best Actor.

=== Film career: establishment and biographical roles (2006–2014) ===
In 2006, he played the second lead in the romantic drama Kshan, alongside Deepa Parab and Prasad Oak, portraying a wealthy man who, due to his wife's illness, selflessly attempts to reunite her with her former lover. The next year, he played a thief in Uladhaal, a film by Aditya Sarpotdar, earning praise from critics for his "strong performance." Bhave continued to take on diverse and challenging roles, he played a music composer in Sanjay Surkar's Sakhi, a compassionate doctor in Man Pakharu Pakharu, a professor in Satish Rajwade's Ek Daav Dhobi Pachhad, and a journalist in Gajendra Ahire's Tya Ratri Paus Hota, co-starring Ashok Saraf, Sachin Pilgaonkar, Sonali Kulkarni and Amruta Subhash. Amidst these serious portrayals, he also delivered a comic performance in Sanai Choughade, playing the quirky owner of a marriage bureau named "Kande-Pohe." Critic Ulhas Shirke remarked that "Bhave catches maximum attention through amazing facial expressions." His portrayal of a struggling musician who descends into crime in Surkar's psychological thriller Ranbhool earned him widespread acclaim and multiple accolades, including the MaTa Sanmaan and Zee Chitra Gaurav Puraskar for Best Actor, as well as Best Male Playback Singer.

While building his film career, Bhave simultaneously maintained a strong presence on television. He gained widespread popularity with leading roles in Iris Productions' Kalat Nakalat (2007-2009), where he played a greedy man opposite Rujuta Deshmukh and Sunil Barve, and in Applause Entertainment's Kulvadhu (2008-2010), portraying an arrogant character opposite Poorva Gokhale. His chemistry with Gokhale was a hit with audiences and won them Best Actor and Best Couple at the Zee Marathi Utsav Natyancha Awards in 2009.

In 2010, Bhave returned to theatre direction after a decade-long break from his previous work on Safar and co-produced a revival of Purushottam Darvhekar’s classic musical play Katyar Kaljat Ghusali (originally staged in 1967). The production was highly successful, running for over 100 shows. Bhave played the role of royal poet Banke Bihari, performing alongside Rahul Deshpande (as Khansaheb) and Mahesh Kale (as Sadashiv), and received widespread praise.

2011 became a major turning point in Bhave's career with his role in Balgandharva, a biographical musical directed by Ravi Jadhav. He portrayed legendary Marathi singer and theatre actor Bal Gandharva, capturing the artist’s journey from poverty to fame, and his personal sacrifices for art and performance. Balgandharva gained international recognition, having its world premiere at the Cannes Film Festival and being screened at prestigious festivals including Venice, Berlin, and New York. Critics were impressed by Bhave's performance, particularly his portrayal of female characters. Shanta Gokhale of Pune Mirror noted that "Bhave makes as stunning a woman as Balgandharva is said to have done," while Keyur Seta of The Common Man Speaks noted, “His acts as women appear so real that it is difficult to believe a male is portraying them. In short, he forces the viewer to stand up and applaud his act.” The film went on to become the highest-grossing film of his career, earning ₹19 crore (US$2.0 million) at the box office, and won him his third Zee Chitra Gaurav Puraskar for Best Actor along with a nomination at the New York Indian Film Festival. That same year, he starred in Paulwaat, a film about human relationships and struggles. Though it earned moderate box office returns, Bhave’s performance and his onscreen chemistry with veteran actress Jyoti Chandekar were praised by critics.

Following his success in Marathi cinema, Bhave made his Hindi film debut in Aiyyaa (2012), opposite Rani Mukerji, playing the suitor chosen by her family. However, this comedy failed both critically and commercially. He found better success in Marathi films that year, appearing as Chintoo's father in Chintoo, directed by Shrirang Godbole, and as an NRI who reconnects with his Indian roots in Abhijeet Gholap’s Bhartiya. Both films were commercial hits.

The years 2013 and 2014 saw Bhave delivering several noteworthy performances. In Balak Palak, a film about sex education and teenage curiosity, he had a brief but impactful role. The film was both a critical and commercial success, earning ₹12 crore (US$1.2 million) and becoming one of the highest-grossing Marathi films of the year. He also reprised his role in the successful franchise sequel Chintoo 2: Khajinyachi Chittarkatha.

During this period, Bhave collaborated with director Gajendra Ahire on four highly regarded films: Touring Talkies, Anumati, Postcard, and Swami Public Ltd. In Touring Talkies, he played an art house director struggling with the dying culture of tent cinema. Although the film had a limited release, it was screened at the 17th International Film Festival of Kerala. Keyur Seta remarked, “Bhave perfectly fits into the shoes of a realistic filmmaker and delivers a mature act.” His performance as a shrewd businessman in Swami Public Ltd. also received praise, with Mihir Bhanage of The Times of India writing, “Subodh portrays his character, who has shades of grey, with precision.” Among these, Anumati emerged as one of the most critically acclaimed films of the year, featuring Bhave alongside actors Vikram Gokhale, Neena Kulkarni and Sai Tamhankar. The film won the Best Feature Film Award at the New York Indian Film Festival. Bhave also starred opposite Mrinal Kulkarni in the psychological family drama A Rainy Day, which portrayed the downfall of a corrupt and ambitious man whose past is gradually exposed by his wife, leading to personal and emotional collapse. The Times of India praised his performance, writing that "Subodh performs well as the hassled and confused husband."

=== Directorial debut and major commercial success (2015–2018) ===
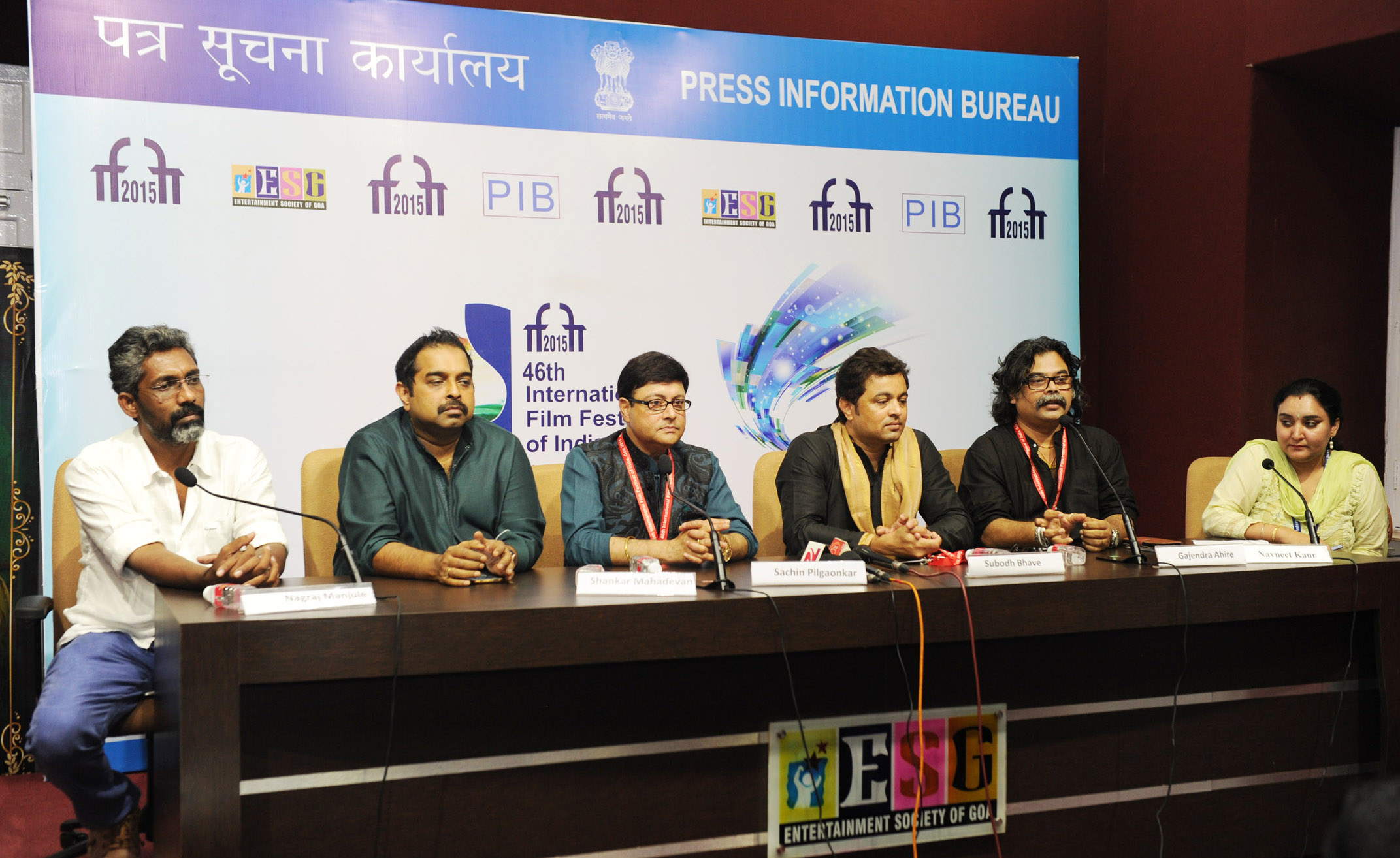
Bhave at a press conference, at the 46th International Film Festival of India, in Panaji, Goa

In 2015, Bhave portrayed the iconic freedom fighter and social reformer Bal Gangadhar Tilak in the acclaimed biographical drama Lokmanya: Ek Yugpurush. To bring authenticity to the role, he even shaved his head. Critics widely praised his performance, with Mihir Bhanage from The Times of India calling it Bhave’s best performance to date and wrote, "Bhave’s brilliant portrayal of Tilak that keeps you rooted and engrossed throughout." The film performed well at the box office, earning ₹13 crore (US$1.3 million), and brought him a Best Actor nomination at the 2nd Filmfare Awards. Bhave made his directorial debut with the film adaptation of the famous musical play Katyar Kaljat Ghusali. In addition to directing, he starred as Sadashiv, a devoted music student who fights to uphold his guru’s legacy. The film featured a stellar cast including Sachin Pilgaonkar, Amruta Khanvilkar and Shankar Mahadevan. It was screened at the 46th International Film Festival of India and released not only across India but also in the UAE, Australia, and Japan. Katyar Kaljat Ghusali proved to be a massive critical and commercial hit, grossing ₹40 crore (US$4.2 million) making it the highest-grossing Marathi film of 2015 and the seventh highest-grossing Marathi film of all time. Sumeet Singh of Indian Nerve wrote, "Bhave has lent his own vision to the story, making it much more appealing to the movie audience." Ganesh Matkari of Pune Mirror praised the film’s ambition and polish, stating, "Katyar is very ambitious and surefooted, in terms of ideas as well as production, and is meticulously presented. The credit for this should go to actor-turned-director Subodh Bhave..." The film won numerous accolades, with Bhave receiving Best Director awards from Filmfare Marathi, Sanskruti Kala Darpan, and Zee Chitra Gaurav Puraskar. That year, he also had two posthumous releases of late director Sanjay Surkar.

He continued his successful streak with the critically acclaimed films Bandh Nylon Che and Bho Bho. In the Hindi musical Ardhangini Ek Ardhsatya, opposite Sreelekha Mitra, he played a progressive aristocrat questioning tradition, a story inspired by Rabindranath Tagore’s novel The Home and the World. Though it was shown at several festivals, the film did not succeed commercially. In the comedy-drama Kiran Kulkarni vs Kiran Kulkarni, he played the titular Kiran Kulkarni, a man whose identity is stolen by a con artist played by Kranti Redkar. His comic timing was well received by critics and audiences alike. His final release of the year was Pinneyum, a Malayalam film directed by the renowned Adoor Gopalakrishnan. The film marked Bhave’s Malayalam debut and was loosely inspired by the infamous 1984 Sukumara Kurup murder case. He played a criminal who undergoes plastic surgery to escape the law. His performance was praised by both critics and audiences.

In 2017, Bhave delivered one of his busiest years with seven film releases. He kicked off the year with the comedy Fugay, co-written with Swapnil Joshi, where they played childhood friends mistaken as a gay couple. Despite its unconventional subject, Fugay was well received, Jaydeep Pathakji of Maharashtra Times wrote, “The hustle and bustle that Swapnil–Subodh bring to the screen is definitely worth seeing.” The film went on to become the seventh highest-grossing Marathi film of the year, earning ₹5.80 crore (US$600,000) at the box office. He then starred in the family drama Karaar alongside Urmila Kothare and Kranti Redkar, which explored emotional and moral dilemmas that arise when legal agreements conflict with human values. Bhave played a calculated and methodical man whose rigid plans are upended by unforeseen emotional developments while his performance was appreciated, The Times of India noted, “Kotian makes Sunil Mokashi turn out to be an outright villain, instead of a man driven by his obsession with financial planning.” In Ti Ani Itar, directed by Govind Nihalani, Bhave played a corporate professional grappling with the decision to act or stay silent after witnessing a violent crime. Bhave’s thoughtful performance was praised for its introspective portrayal of bystander ethics. Bhave reunited with Mukta Barve after eight years for Vikram Phadnis’ Hrudayantar, a touching drama about a family facing their daughter’s leukemia diagnosis. Devesh Sharma of Filmfare wrote, “The film belongs to Mukta Barve and Subodh Bhave, both of whom get under the skin of their characters with consummate ease. Their body language and silences are no less expressive than their dialogues.” His portrayed a workaholic hotelier caught between his luxurious lifestyle and his neglected family, a role that earned him his second Filmfare Award nomination for Best Actor.

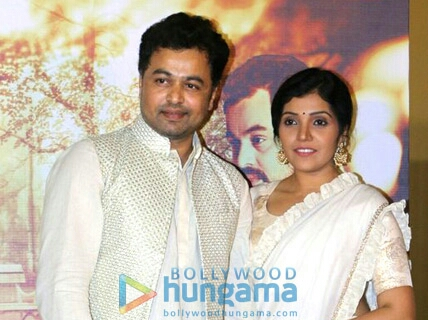
Bhave and Mukta Barve at first look of Hrudayantar

Later, he starred in Tula Kalnnaar Nahi, a romantic drama about a married couple on the verge of separation. The film earned ₹2.3 crore (US$240,000) and was recognized for the strong on-screen chemistry between Bhave and Sonalee Kulkarni, who together captured the emotional ups and downs of reconciliation. Rounding out the year, Bhave appeared in Chhand Priticha, a love-triangle set in the world of traditional lavani folk theatre. He played Rajaram, a blind dholki (drum) player, and gave a restrained, standout performance that kept the film grounded. Ganesh Matkari of Pune Mirror wrote, “The only thing acceptable here is Subodh’s performance. He effectively underplays Rajaram and keeps the film from going overboard.” Reflecting on the project, he stated, “I have not been part of a lavani-centric film in Marathi before."

Bhave made his debut as a producer–writer with the spiritual film Pushpak Vimaan, telling the story of Tatya, a devoted follower of Sant Tukaram who dreams of ascending to heaven in a Pushpak Vimaan just like the saint. Although the film received mixed reviews, Bhave earned a nomination for Best Actor at the MFK Awards. He then ventured into the psychological thriller genre with Savita Damodar Paranjpe, based on Shekhar Tamhane's play and produced by John Abraham. In his third collaboration with director Swapna Waghmare Joshi, he played a man whose peaceful marriage unravels when his wife starts behaving alarmingly, a role that found both box-office and critical success. Bhave’s talent for portraying emotional depth was highlighted in the relationship drama Shubh Lagna Savdhan, and his playful side came through in the slapstick comedy Maza Agadbam. In the same year, Bhave returned to television with the psychological thriller Tula Pahate Re on Zee Marathi, playing the enigmatic Vikrant Saranjame. The show was a massive hit, holding the top TRP spot and earning Bhave the Zee Marathi Utsav Natyancha Award for Best Actor.

The most significant highlight of his year, was his transformation into the legendary Dr. Kashinath Ghanekar in Ani... Dr. Kashinath Ghanekar, a biographical drama tracing the superstar’s journey from dentist to celebrated performer. Bhave initially turned down the film but ultimately accepted the role, losing 12 kg and describing it as one of the toughest of his career. The film was both a critical and commercial success, grossing ₹16 crore (US$1.7 million) at the box office, and Bhave’s performance was widely acclaimed. Sameer Javale of Loksatta called it “effective” and noted, “Bhave has portrayed all these shades perfectly with his worthy acting.” Keyur Seta ascribed, “The subject needed Subodh Bhave to give one of his best performances, and that is exactly what he has done. The actor has lived the character of Ghanekar, displaying various emotions with ease. Despite portraying arrogance, he never lets the character appear negative.” Both Savita Damodar Paranjpe and Ani... Dr. Kashinath Ghanekar were listed among the Best Marathi Films of 2018 by several media outlets.

=== Diverse roles and recent works (2019–Present) ===
In May 2019, he revived Vasant Kanetkar’s iconic play Ashroonchi Zhali Phule, taking on the famous role of Lalya. The limited 51-show run sold out Maharashtra and was so well received that it went on to tour the United States, underscoring Bhave’s dedication to preserving and reinvigorating the legacy of Marathi theatre. In Ek Nirnay… Swatahacha Swatasathi, he portrayed a paediatrician facing ethical dilemmas and family struggles around sperm donation after his new marriage suffers a miscarriage. While it had an average box office performance, Kalpeshraj Kubal of Maharashtra Times wrote, “Bhave has acted beautifully and effortlessly, as befits his reputation.” In Kahi Kshan Premache, opposite Bhargavi Chirmule, was a major failure, and his performance was described as mediocre. Bhave had a supporting role in Sumitra Bhave–Sunil Sukthankar’s acclaimed family drama Welcome Home, and showcased his comic flair in Appa Ani Bappa, Bhave played “Bappa”, a human incarnation of Lord Ganesha, helping a struggling devotee deal with festival-related debts, a performance commended for its warmth and good humor.

He began 2020 with Bhaybheet, a psychological thriller and remake of the 2005 film Hide and Seek, where he portrayed a grieving father whose daughter begins exhibiting erratic behavior after her mother’s death, leading him to suspect supernatural influences. The film earned critical acclaim but saw only moderate commercial success. In the sports drama Vijeta, Bhave played a dedicated mind coach who leads Maharashtra’s underperforming athletes to victory at the National Games. Critics praised his motivating screen presence, although the COVID-19 pandemic limited the film’s theatrical run during its early momentum. On the small screen, Bhave starred in the suspense thriller Chandra Aahe Sakshila on Colors Marathi, earning recognition for his layered portrayal of Shridhar Kale in a story filled with twists and family intrigue.

Bhave again joined director Abhijeet Deshpande for the 2022 historical action epic Har Har Mahadev, the first Marathi film released in five languages. He portrayed the legendary warrior king Chhatrapati Shivaji Maharaj, opposite Sharad Kelkar’s Baji Prabhu Deshpande, in a retelling of the Battle of Pavan Khind. Shalmesh More of Koimoi.com called his performance a “masterclass,” while a Rediff reviewer wrote, “He strikes the perfect balance between drama and theatrics in his body language and expressions, giving us yet another memorable character.” It grossed ₹25 crore (US$2.6 million) worldwide, becoming the third highest-grossing Marathi film of 2022, with Bhave’s portrayal earning him a nomination for Best Supporting Actor at the Maharashtra State Film Awards. In 2023, Bhave co-starred in the dark comedy thriller Vaalvi, playing a psychiatrist who becomes entangled in a twisted murder cover-up. The film proved a hit, grossing ₹7.25 crore (US$750,000), ranking as the year’s Sixth highest grossing Marathi film and winning the National Film Award for Best Feature Film in Marathi. Bhave’s nuanced role earned him nominations for Best Supporting Actor at both the Filmfare Awards Marathi and Zee Chitra Gaurav Puraskar. He went on to play a mentor figure in the musical comedy Phulrani, opposite Priyadarshini Indalkar, and appeared in the satirical comedy Sajini Shinde Ka Viral Video, both of which earned positive reviews for his supporting performances. He also made a notable appearance as Birbal in the 2023 period drama web series Taj: Divided by Blood, sharing the screen with veteran actor Naseeruddin Shah.

Bhave’s first release of 2024 was the ensemble comedy-drama Alibaba Aani Chalishitale Chor, based on the popular play of the same name. Co-starring Atul Parchure, Anand Ingale, Umesh Kamat, Mukta Barve, Madhura Velankar, and Shruti Marathe, the film follows seven friends in their forties whose casual gathering takes a chaotic turn when the lights go out, resulting in a mysterious kiss and an unexpected slap. Critics praised the movie’s interesting premise and relatable humor, though some noted the execution felt uneven. Despite a positive start, the film earned a moderate ₹2.99 crore (US$310,000) at the box office. Another notable 2024 release was the romantic drama Hashtag Tadev Lagnam, where Bhave starred opposite Tejashree Pradhan. The film explored themes of marriage, friendship, and second chances, focusing on a gentle, sincere, and sometimes absent-minded professor played by Bhave. While the movie was well-loved by the audience and critics alike, limited theatrical screenings meant its total earnings were just ₹1.14 crore (US$120,000). He also played the supportive brother of Hanumant Kendre (played and directed by Adinath Kothare) in Paani, a socially driven drama about solving the water crisis in drought-stricken villages. Although the film received critical praise and won the National Film Award for Best Film on Environment Conservation for its socially relevant message, it failed to make a mark commercially and flopped at the box office.

Returning to direction after a decade, Bhave helmed and starred in the ambitious musical Sangeet Manapmaan, inspired by the 1911 Marathi theatre classic of the same name by Krishnaji Prabhakar Khadilkar. Portraying Dhairyadhar, he dove into a rich tale of love, jealousy, and honor alongside Vaidehi Parshurami and Sumeet Raghavan. While reviewers like My Mahanagar wrote, “With excellent writing, direction, music, and acting, Bhave has delivered a true musical gem in the modern era of Marathi cinema” and Maharashtra Times praised him for effectively handling dual responsibilities as actor and director, stating that he “brilliantly portrayed a strong and dignified hero.” The film was appreciated for its grandeur, many felt it fell short of the benchmark set by Katyar Kaljat Ghusali, ultimately struggled at the box office. In the thriller Devmanus, Bhave surprised audiences with his negative turn as inspector in this Marathi remake of the Hindi film Vadh. Additionally, Bhave made his solo lead debut in two Hindi films: His Story of Itihaas and Sant Tukaram. In the former, Bhave played a principled physics teacher who questions how history is taught in schools, a role initially turned down by sixty other actors. Amit Bhatia of ABP Live wrote, “His monologues are powerful and persuasive, capturing the urgency of the subject.” He followed it with the titular role in Sant Tukaram, a biographical film on the 17th-century Marathi poet-saint. Bhave’s deeply spiritual and transformative performance earned critical acclaim with Simran Singh of DNA India called it “his career-best performance,” noting that “his commanding screen presence in the climax will leave viewers teary-eyed.” While both Hindi films received praise for their themes and performances, they saw no commercial success.

== Personal life ==
Bhave married his childhood friend, Manjiri Deshpande, on 12 July 2001; the couple had first met in the eighth grade began dating after rekindling their friendship years later, and dated for ten years before tying the knot. The couple reside in Mumbai with their two sons, Kanha and Malhar.
