= His Story of Itihaas =

2025 Hindi language film by Manpreet Singh

- Directed by: Manpreet Singh Dhami
- Written by: Manpreet Singh Dhami
- Based on: Brainwashed Republic: India's Controlled Systemic Deracination
- Produced by: Manpreet Singh Dhami
- Starring: Subodh Bhave; Yogendra Tikku; Ankur Vikal; Sachin K Jaryal; Vasanti Sundaram
- Cinematography: Vinod Patil
- Edited by: B. Mahanteshwar
- Music by: Advait Sawant
- Production company: Panchkarma Productions
- Release date: 30 May 2025
- Running time: 144 minutes
- Country: India
- Language: Hindi

His Story of Itihaas is a 2025 Indian Hindi-language drama film written, directed, and produced by Manpreet Singh Dhami under Panchkarma Productions. Based on the book Brainwashed Republic: India's Controlled Systemic Deracination, the film predominantly employs Hindutva pseudohistorical narratives and identity politics. It features Subodh Bhave in the lead role, alongside Yogendra Tikku, and Ankur Vikal. The film was released theatrically across India on 30 May 2025.

== Plot ==
The film is based on a physics teacher, named Namit Bharadwaj, from Chandigarh who challenges perceived distorted historical narratives taught in Indian schools. Motivated by a desire to uncover the truth, Bharadwaj uses the Right to Information Act to question long-held accounts presented in history textbooks. The story follows his battle to correct perceived historical falsehoods and biases and his fight against what is perceived to be an indifferent system.

== Cast ==
- Subodh Bhave as Namit Bharadwaj
- Yogendra Tikku as Kamal Subramanian
- Ankur Vikal as Ishaan Kabir
- Sachin K Jaryal as IAS Ashish
- Vasanti Sundaram as Chhaya Mukherjee

== Production and release ==
The movie is based on the book Brainwashed Republic: India's Controlled Systemic Deracination. Manpreet Singh Dhami served as the writer, director, and producer of the film, under the banner of Panchkarma Productions. Prior to Bhave's acceptance of the lead character, the role had been rejected by over 60 actors.

His Story of Itihaas was officially released in movie theatres across India on 30 May 2025.

== Pseudohistorical premises and ideological bias ==
The film primarily plays on Hindutva pseudohistorical narratives and identity politics. It attributes a wide range of significant developments, from scientific discoveries to the origins of various popular food items, all to a glorified vision of India's pre-Mughal and pre-British past. In an interview, Dhami said, "I went to Europe for the first time 13 years ago, and I felt inferior. I later realised my civilisational greatness."

The many historical falsehoods presented as factual information in the film include the depiction of Sati, a historical Hindu practice involving the immolation of widows on their husbands’ funeral pyres, as a solely voluntary act, rather than one carried out under force or social pressure. The film also propagates the erroneous claim that the Indian caste system was a construct introduced by British colonial rulers. Additionally, it suggests, without credible historical evidence, that gurukulas once enrolled a greater number of Shudra students than Brahmins. Another claim made is that religious conversions from Hinduism to other faiths during the Mughal era were motivated by the imposition of taxes on non-Muslims, rather than as a way to escape the caste system. Furthermore, the characters of Chhaya Mukherjee and Ishaan Kabir, portrayed as liberal historians, are depicted as manipulative and conniving.

== See also ==
- Propaganda film
- Hindutva pseudohistory
- Historical negationism
