= Pushpak Vimaan =

- Theatrical release poster
- Directed by: Vaibhav Chinchalkar
- Screenplay by: Chatan Bhila Saundane; Vaibhav Chinchalkar
- Story by: Subodh Bhave
- Produced by: Manjiri Bhave; Arun Joshi; Sunil Phadtare; Minal Indulkar; Varsha Patil
- Starring: Mohan Joshi; Subodh Bhave; Gauri Mahajan
- Cinematography: Mahesh Aney
- Edited by: Ashish Mhatre; Apurva Motiwale
- Music by: Music: Narendra Bhide; Santosh Mulekar; Songs: Sameer Samant; Chetan Bhila Saundane; Score: Santosh Mulekar
- Production companies: Shree Ganesh Marketing and Films; Kanha's Magic; Beyond Media; Maydesh Media
- Distributed by: Zee Studios
- Release date: 3 August 2018
- Running time: 133 minutes
- Country: India
- Language: Marathi

Pushpak Vimaan is a 2018 Indian Marathi-language drama film directed by Vaibhav Chinchalkar in his directorial debut. The film stars Mohan Joshi, Subodh Bhave, and Gauri Mahajan. It was theatrically released on 3 August 2018.

== Plot ==
Tatya is a staunch follower of the sant Tukaram and firmly believes that the pious man Pushpaka Vimaana ascended to heaven. He dreams of following in Tukaram's footsteps.

== Cast ==
- Mohan Joshi as Tatya
- Subodh Bhave as Vilas
- Gauri Mahajan as Smita
- Rahul Deshpande as Sant Tukaram
- Suyash Zunzurke as Firoz

== Release ==
The film was theatrically released on 3 August 2018.

== Critical reception ==
Mukund Kule of The Times of India rated 2.5 out of 5 stars and wrote "The music is the strength of this film and can help Pushpak Vimaan fly through." Sharvari Joshi of Loksatta gave 3 stars out of 5 and praised performances of actors.
