= Ranbhool =

2010 Indian film

- Theatrical release poster
- Directed by: Sanjay Surkar
- Produced by: Pratibha Mendhekar
- Starring: Subodh Bhave; Tejaswini Pandit; Mohan Joshi; Saii Ranade Sane; Vinay Apte
- Music by: Narendra Bhide
- Release date: 14 May 2010
- Country: India
- Language: Marathi

Ranbhool is an Indian Marathi psychological thriller movie released on 14 May 2010.The movie has been produced by Pratibha Mendhekar and directed by Sanjay Surkar.

== Cast ==
The cast includes Subodh Bhave, Tejaswini Pandit, Mohan Joshi, Sai Ranade Sane, Gargi Daftardar, Vinay Apte & Others.

== Soundtrack ==
The music is provided by Narendra Bhide.
