= List of Marathi films of 2015 =

This is a list of Marathi films released in 2015.

== Box office Collection ==
Rank	Film	Director	Studio (s)	Worldwide gross	Ref.
1	Katyar Kaljat Ghusali	Subodh Bhave	Zee Studios; Shree Ganesh Marketing & Films	₹40 crore (US$4.2 million)	
2	Dagadi Chawl	Chandrakant Kanse	Mangalmurti Films; Sai Pooja Film & Entertainment Production	₹37 crore (US$3.8 million)	
3	Timepass 2	Ravi Jadhav	Essel Vision Productions	₹31 crore (US$3.2 million)	
4	Classmates	Aditya Sarpotdar	Mahalasa Entertainment; Media Monks	₹21 crore (US$2.2 million)	
5	Deool Band	Pravin Tarde	Vatavruksha Entertainment	₹20 crore (US$2.1 million)	
6	Double Seat	Sameer Vidwans	Essel Vision Productions	₹20 crore (US$2.1 million)	
7	Mumbai-Pune-Mumbai 2	Satish Rajwade	Yashlita Enterprises Pvt. Ltd.	₹18 crore (US$1.9 million)	
8	Mitwaa	Swapna Waghmare Joshi	Sagar Pictures Entertainment	₹13.5 crore (US$1.4 million)	
9	Lokmanya: Ek Yugpurush	Om Raut	Neena Raut Films	₹13 crore (US$1.3 million)	
10	Baji	Nikhil Mahajan	DAR Motion Pictures; Virtue Entertainment; Blue Drop Films IME Motion Pictures	₹10.79 crore (US$1.1 million)	
11	Killa	Avinash Arun	Essel Vision Productions	₹10 crore (US$1.0 million)	

== January–March ==
Opening		Title	Director	Cast	Ref.
J A N	2	Lokmanya: Ek Yugpurush	Om Raut	Subodh Bhave, Shweta Mahadik, Chinmay Mandlekar, Priya Bapat	
J A N	16	Classmates	Aditya Ajay Sarpotdar	Ankush Choudhary, Sai Tamhankar, Sachit Patil, Sonalee Kulkarni, Siddharth Chandekar, Sushant Shelar, Suyash Tilak, Pallavi Patil	
J A N	23	Balkadu	Atul Kale	Umesh Kamat, Neha Pendse	
J A N	30	Ek Tara	Avdhoot Gupte	Santosh Juvekar, Tejaswini Pandit	
F E B	6	Baji	Nikhil Mahajan	Shreyas Talpade, Amruta Khanvilkar, Jitendra Joshi	
F E B	13	Mitwaa	Swapna Waghmare Joshi	Swwapnil Joshi, Sonalee Kulkarni, Prarthana Behere	
F E B	20	Chitrafit - 3.0 Megapixel	Divakar Ghodake	Ashish Pathode, Seema Azmi, Ravi Patwardhan, Gauri Shankar	
F E B	27	Razzakar (film)	Raj Durge	Siddharth Jadhav, Jyoti Subhash	
M A R	13	Bugadi Maazi Sandli Ga	Manasingh Pawar	Kashyap Parulekar, Manasi Moghe	
M A R	27	Just Gammat	Milind Arun Kavde	Sanjay Narvekar, Jitendra Joshi, Smita Gondkar, Aditi Sarangdhar	

== April–June ==
Opening		Title	Director	Cast	Ref.
A P R	3	Coffee Ani Barach Kahi	Prakash Kunte	Vaibbhav Tatwawdi, Prarthana Behere, Neha Mahajan, Bhushan Pradhan	
A P R	3	Prem At First Sight	Santosh Mainkar	Sumaydh Gaikwad, Shweta Pagar, Suchet Gavai	
A P R	3	Kaay Raav Tumhi	Mrunalini Patil	Ravindra Mahajani, Satish Pulekar, Yatin Karyekar,	
A P R	10	Kaakan	Kranti Redkar	Jitendra Joshi, Urmila Kanetkar, Kranti Redkar	
A P R	17	What About Savarkar?	Rupesh Katare, Nitin Gawde	Sharad Ponkshe, Avinash Narkar, Atul Todankar, Shrikant Bhide, Sara Shravan	
A P R	17	Court	Chaitanya Tamhane	Vivek Gomber, Geetanjali Kulkarni, Vira Sathidar, Pradeep Joshi, Usha Bane, Shirish Pawar	
A P R	17	Te Don Diwas	Devendra Dodke	Mohan Joshi, Alka Kubal, Arun Nalavade, Dr. Vilas Ujawane	
A P R	24	Aatli Batli Phutli	Amol Padave	Smita Talwalkar, Sampada Jogalikar Kulkarni, Sharayu, Aney, Jivan, Shreyali, Viraj, Aditya, Purva	
A P R	24	Mhais	Shekhar Nayak	Jitendra Joshi, Sanjay Mone	
M A Y	1	Timepass 2	Ravi Jadhav	Priya Bapat, Priyadarshan Jadhav, Prathamesh Parab, Ketaki Mategaonkar, Vaibhav Mangle, Bhau Kadam	
M A Y	15	Runh	Vishal D Gaikwad	Omkar Govardhan, Manoj Joshi, Narayani Shastri, Rajeshwari Sachdev	
M A Y	15	Yudh Astitvachi Ladai	Rajiv S Ruia	Rajesh Shringarpure, Tejaswini Pandit, Kranti Redkar	
M A Y	15	Sasu Cha Swayamwar	Omkar Mane	Pushkar Jog, Vishakha Subhedar, Teja Deokar, Vijay Chavan	
M A Y	22	Aga Bai Arechyaa 2	Kedar Shinde	Sonali Kulkarni, Bharat Jadhav, Prasad Oak	
M A Y	22	Dabba Ais Pais	Manish Joshi	Sadashiv Amrapurkar, Ganesh Yadav, Kashmira Kulkarni	
M A Y	22	Pashbandh	Anand Oroskar	Nandita Dhuri	
M A Y	22	Goa 350 KM	Amol Padave	Yatin Karyekar, Sanjay Mone, Madhuri Desai, Gaurav Ghatnekar, Dhanashree	
M A Y	29	Siddhant	Vivek Wag	Vikram Gokhale, Sarang Sathaye, Neha Mahajan	
M A Y	29	Prime Time	Promod Kashyap	Kishore Pradhan, Milind Shintre, Sulekha Talwalkar, Krutika Deo, Nisha Parulekar	
M A Y	29	A Paying Ghost	Surut Bhagwat	Umesh Kamat, Spruha Joshi, Pushkar Shrotri, Sharvani Pillai, Anita Date, Atul Parchure	
M A Y	29	Dhurandhar Bhatawdekar	Kshitij Zarapkar	Mohan Joshi, Mohan Agashe, Kishori Shahane, Tanvi Hegde	
M A Y	29	Guntha Mantri	Sachin Shinde	Makrand Anajpure, Rutuza Patil, Chetan Dalvi, Kishori Ambiye, Baal Dhuri, Usha Naik	
J U N	5	Sandook	Atul Kale	Sumeet Raghavan, Bhargavi Chirmule	
J U N	5	Sata Lota Pan Sagla Khota	Shrabani Deodhar	Adinath Kothare, Siddharth Chandekar, Mrunmayee Deshpande, Pooja Sawant, Makarand Anaspure	
J U N	5	Atithi	Ashish Pujari	Vijay Chavan, Milind Shinde, Sanjay Khapre	
J U N	5	Thakracha Tukya	Jaganath Baban Khandave	Rajesh Nanaware, Shivraj Bhor, Prity Sagvan, Murnal Pathave	
J U N	12	Tujhya Vin Mar Javaan	Murali Nallappa, Ashok Karlekar	Vikas Patil, Prarthana Behere, Prateeksha Lonkar, Atul Parchure	
J U N	12	Nagrik	Jaypraad Desai	Sachin Khedekar, Dr. Shriram Lagoo, Dilip Prabhavalkar, Milind Soman, Devika Daftardar, Rajesh Sharma, Neena Kulkarni, Rajkumar Tangde, Sambhaji Bhagat, Sulabha Deshpande, Madhav Abhyankar	
J U N	12	Sugar Salt Ani Prem	Sonali Bangera	Sonali Kulkarni, Sameer Dharmadhikari, Ajinkya Dev, Shilpa Tulaskar, Prasad Oak, Kranti Redkar	
J U N	19	Time Bara Vait	Rahul Bhatankar	Bhushan Pradhan, Hrishikesh Joshi, Satish Rajwade, Nidhi oza	
J U N	19	Wanted Bayko No. 1	Raju Pareskar	Makarand Anaspure, Sayaji Shinde, Tejaswini Lonari, Smita Gondkar	
J U N	19	2 Premi Premache	Kamal Thakur	Swwapnil Joshi, Girija Oak, Pritee Arora, Arun Bakshi, Anjana Mumta	
J U N	19	Blackboard	Dinesh Deolekar	Arun Nalawade, Madhavi Juvekar, Charles Gomes, Gauri Navalkar	
J U N	26	Killa	Avinash Arun	Parth Bhalerao, Archit Deodhar, Gaurish Gawade, Atharva Upasni, Amruta Subhash	
J U N	26	Welcome Zindagi	Umesh Ghadge	Swwapnil Joshi, Amruta Khanvilkar	
J U N	26	Dream Mall	Suraj Mulekar	Siddharth Jadhav, Neha Joshi	

== July–September ==
Opening	Title	Director	Cast	Genre	Source
3 July	Shutter	V. K. Prakash	Sachin Khedekar, Sonalee Kulkarni, Amey Wagh, Prakash Bare	Thriller, Drama	
3 July	Online Binline	Kedar Gaekwad	Siddharth Chandekar, Hemant Dhome, Rutuja Shinde	Romance, Comedy	
3 July	Dhol Taashe	Ankur Kakatkar	Jitendra Joshi, Abhijeet Khandkekar, Hrishitaa Bhatt, Pradeep Welankar, Ila Bhate, Vidaydhar joshi, Vijay Andalkar, Shekhar Phadke, Rajkumar Anjute, Vinay Apte, Atul Tapkir	Drama	
10 July	Murder Mestri	Rahul Jadhav	Dilip Prabhavalkar, Hrishikesh Joshi, Vikas Kadam, Vandana Gupte, Kranti Redkar	Thriller, Comedy, Mystery	
17 July	Bioscope	Ravi Jadhav, Viju Mane, Girish Mohite, Gajendra Ahire	Veena Jamkar, Mrunmayee Godbole, Kushal Badrike, Neena Kulkarni, Mangesh Desai	Drama	
24 July	Carry On Maratha	Sanjay Londhe	Gashmeer Mahajani, Kashmira Kulkarni	Action, Romance	
24 July	Panhala	Nagesh Bhonsle	Nagesh Bhosle, Sangram Salvi, Samidha Guru, Amruta Sant, Makrand Deshpande	Drama	
24 July	Manaatlya Unhat	Paandurang K. Jadhav	Kailash Waghmare, Mitalee jagtap, Kishor Kadam	Drama	
24 July	Waghi	Sandeep Salgaonkar	Shubhangi Bhujbal, Kavya Mungekar	Drama	
31 July	Deool Band	Pravin Tarde, Pranit Kulkarni	Gashmeer Mahajani, Girija Joshi, Mohan Agashe, [Nivedita Saraf, Shweta Shinde, Satish Alekar	Drama, Thriller	
31 July	Janiva	Rajesh Ranshinge	Satya Manjrekar, Vaibhavi Sandilya, Anuradha Mukharjee, Devdutt Dani, Sanket Agarwal, Kiran Karmarkar, Renuka Shahane, Atul Parchure, Indira Krishnan, Salil Ankola, Usha Nadkarni, Kishor Kadam	Drama	
31 July	Olakh - My Identity	Jameel Khan	Bhushan Patil, Khushboo Tawde, Alka Kubal, Arun Nalawade	Drama	
7 August	Nilkanth Master	Gajendra Ahire	Adinath Kothare, Pooja Sawant, Vikram Gokhale, Kishor Kadam, Neha Mahajan, Omkar Govardhan	Thriller, Action, Drama	
7 August	Gurukul	Rommel Rodrigues	Nagesh Bhosle, Vidyadhar Joshi, Asit Redij, Prashant Mohite, Pradeep Kuwar, Swwapnil Joshi, Sonalee Shewale, Neha Khan, Reenna Limon	Social Drama	
7 August	Shortcut	Harish Raut	Vaibbhav Tatwawdi, Sanskruti Balgude, Rajesh Shringarpure, Naresh Bidkar	Crime, Thriller	
7 August	Superb Plan	Jai Tari	Trupti Bhoir, Satyanand Gaitonde, Girish Pardeshi, Rajendra Shisatkar, Nayna Muke, Vidya Sawale	Action, Drama, Thriller	
14 August	Double Seat	Sameer Vidhwans	Ankush Choudhary, Mukta Barve	Drama	
21 August	Dhinchak Enterprise	Nishant Sapkale	Bhushan Pradhan, Manava Naik	Comedy, Drama	
21 August	Slam Book	Ruturaj Dhalgade	Ritika Shrotri, Shantanu Rangnekar	Romance, Drama	
21 August	3:56 Killari	Deepak Bhagwat	Sai Tamhankar, Jackie Shroff	Suspense Thriller, Drama	
21 August	Nyayaam	Sunil Agresar	Sunil Godbole, Prakash Dhotre, Kratik Chavan, Sima Kulkarni	Drama	
28 August	Dholki	Raju Desai, Vishal Desai	Siddarth Jadhav, Manasi Naik, Kashmira Kulkarni, Sayaji Shinde, Jyoti Chandekar, Sanjay Kulkarni, Dr Vilas Ujawane, Vijay Nikam, Vandana	Drama, Comedy	
28 August	Highway	Umesh Kulkarni	Girish Kulkarni, Mukta Barve, Tisca Chopra, Huma Qureshi, Renuka Shahane, Vidyadhar Joshi, Sunil Barve, Savita Prabhune, Kishor Kadam	Road Movie	
28 August	Shegavicha Yogi Gajanan	Pitambar Kale	Jackie Shroff, Milind Gunaji, Sanjay Khapre, Deepali Sayad, Bharat Ganeshpure	Drama	
28 August	Saangati	Sunilsingh Shivalkar, Ramvijay Waman Parab	Gaurav Ghatnekar, Smita Oak, Satish Pulekar	Drama	
4 September	Tu Hi Re	Sanjay Jadhav	Swwapnil Joshi, Sai Tamhankar, Tejaswini Pandit	Drama, Romance	
4 September	The Shadow	Rohaan Satghare	Manasi Naik, Ashok Pawade	Horror, Drama	
11 September	Vaajlaach Paahije: Game Ki Shinema	R.Vraj	Bhalchandra Kadam, Chinmay Udgirkar, Girija Joshi, Rajesh Bhosle, Aarti Solanki	Romantic comedy	
11 September	Sarva Kahi Priye Fakt Tujhyasathi	Bhimrao Rahate	Bhaskar Kendre Bhimrao Rahate, Kavita Pawaskar, Ajita Kulkarni, Prapti Bane	Romance	
25 September	Vakratunda Mahakaaya	Punarvasu Naik	Vijay Maurya, Naman Jain, Shashank Shende, Prarthana Behere, Rishi Deshpande, Jayant Sawarkar, Usha Nadkarni	Thriller, Drama	

== October–December ==
Opening	Title	Director	Cast	Genre	Source
2 October	Dagadi Chawl	Chandrakant Kanse	Ankush Choudhary, Makarand Deshpande, Pooja SawantRohan Bhosale, Shraddha More- Bhosale	Crime, Action	
2 October	Mungla	Vijay Devkar	Lokesh Gupte, Suhas Palashikar, Ganesh Yadav	Drama	
9 October	Biker's Adda	Rajesh Latkar	Santosh Juvekar, Prarthana Behere	Thriller, Action, Drama	
16 October	Rajwade and Sons	Sachin Kundalkar	Atul Kulkarni, Sachin Khedekar, Mrinal Kulkarni, Satish Alekar, Jyoti Subhash, Amrtriyaan Patil, Alok Rajwade, Siddharth Menon, Mrinmayee Godbole, Krutika Dev	Drama	
16 October	Citizen	Amol Shetge	Raqesh Vashisth, Madhav Deochake, Rajshree Landgey,	Drama	
22 October	Khwada	Bhaurao Karhade	Shashank Shende, Anil Nagarkar, Bhau Shinde, Surekha	Drama	
23 October	Dagadabaichi Chaal	Sunil Wailkar	Rajpal Yadav, Vishakha Subhedar, Sangram Salvi, Mohini Kulkarni, Bhushan Kadu	Comedy	
30 October	Than Than Gopal	Kartik Shetty	Milind Gunaji, Milind Gawali, Vivek Chabukswar, Suzanne Bernert	Drama	
30 October	Te Aath Divas	Shyam Dhanorkar	Tushar Dalvi, Renuka Shahane, Atul Todankar, Aroh Velankar, Deepali Muchrikar, Avinash Masurekar, Sunil Joshi	Drama	
30 October	Bedardi	Sahil Seth	Omkar Kulkarni, Pooja Narang, Arun Nalawade, Rajesh Kamle	Drama	
6 November	Veerat Veer Maratha	Amol Bhave	Arya Jeet, Tanvi Kishore, Reema Lagoo, Harish Sawant	Action, Romantic, Thriller	
6 November	Nazar	Gorakh Jogdand	Teja Devkar, Swapnil Rajshekhar, Ravi Patwardhan, Arun Nalawade	Drama, Thriller	
6 November	Ek Thriller Night	Pradeep Mistry	Khushboo Tawde, Sanskruti Balgude, Ashmit Patel, Elena Kazan, Ketan Pendse	Drama, Thriller	
12 November	Mumbai-Pune-Mumbai 2	Satish Rajwade	Swwapnil Joshi, Mukta Barve	Drama, Romance	
12 November	Katyar Kaljat Ghusali	Subodh Bhave	Subodh Bhave, Amruta Khanvilkar, Mrunmyee Deshpande, Shankar Mahadevan, Sachin Pilgaonkar	Musical, Drama	
27 November	Shinma	Milind Arun Kavde	Ajinkya Deo, Vijay Patkar, Kishori Shahane, Sanskruti Balgude, Gurleen Chopra	Comedy, Drama	
27 November	Mahanayak Vasant Tu	Nilesh Jalamkar	Chinmay Mandalekar, Nisha Parulekar, Bharat Ganeshpure, Ravi Patvardhan, Jayaraj Nayar, Prakash Dhotre	Biopic, Drama	
27 November	Urfi	Vikram Pradhan	Prathamesh Parab, Mitali Mayekar, Upendra Limaye, Kavita Lad, Milind Phatak, Uday Sabnis	Romantic, Thriller	
27 November	Dhangarwada	Sameer Athalye	Sadashiv Amrapurkar, Milind Gawali, Ganesh Yadav, Pooja Pawar	Drama	
27 November	Shalee	Atul Satam	Chetana Bhatt, Vijay Gokhale, Sanjivani Jadhav, Digambar Naik, Jaywant Wadkar, Shivkanta Sutar, Ganesh mane, Abhay Khadapkar, Sahil Gaokar	Drama	
4 December	Partu	Nitin Adsul	Smita Tambe, Kishor Kadam, Navni Parihar	Drama	
4 December	Cinderella	Kiran Nakti	Rupesh Bane, Yashashwi Wengurlekar, Mangesh Desai, Janardan Parab, Yakub Sayed, Vineet Bhonde,	Drama	
4 December	Bai Go Bai	Vijay Pagare	Nirmiti Sawant, Nayan Jadhav, Shital Pathak	Comedy, Thriller	
4 December	Mala Aai Pahije	Laxman More	Milind Gunaji, Nishigandha Wad	Drama	
11 December	Carry On Deshpande	Vijay Patkar	Pushkar Shrotri, Manasi Naik, Sanjay Khapre, Vijay Kadam	Comedy	
11 December	Laathi	Sanjay Surkar	Sachin Khedekar, Subodh Bhave, Smita Tambe, Nagesh Bhosale, Shakti Kapoor, Astad Kale, Vidyadhar Joshi,	Drama	
25 December	Pilantrru	Sanjay Kolte	Chinmay Deshkar, Prabhakar Ambone	Social Drama	
