= List of Marathi films of 2014 =

A list of films produced by the Marathi language film industry based in Maharashtra in 2014.

== January – March ==
	Opening	Title	Director	Cast	Genre	Source
J A N	3	Timepass	Ravi Jadhav	Prathamesh Parab, Ketaki Mategaonkar, Vaibhav Mangle, Bhalchandra Kadam, Meghana Erande, Urmila Kanitkar	Comedy / Romance	
J A N	10	1909	Abhay Kambli	Akshay Shimpi, Rohan Pednekar, Shrikant Bhide	Drama, Action	
J A N	14	Bharla Malwat Rakhtaana	Anup Jagdale	Teja Devkar, Sanjay Khapre, Kavita Radeshyam		
J A N	24					
J A N	31	Pune Via Bihar	Sachin Goswami	Bharat Jadhav, Umesh Kamat, Mrunmayee Deshpande	Thriller	
F E B	7	Sangharsh	Saisparsh	Rajesh Shringarpure, Sangeeta Kapure, Prajakta Mali, Nakul Ghanekar, Anshuman Vichare	Drama	
F E B	14	Fandry	Nagraj Manjule	Somnath Avghade, Rajeshwari Kharat, Kishor Kadam, Chhaya Kadam, Nagraj Manjule	Drama	
F E B	14	Khairlanjichya Mathyawar (film)	Raju Meshram	Kishori Shahane, Vilas Ujawane	Drama	
F E B	14	Priyatama	Satish Motling	Siddarth Jadhav, Girija Joshi, Sanjay Khapre, Charusheela Vacchani, Praful Samant, Sagar Satpute	Romance	
F E B	21	Sau Shashi Deodhar	Amol Shetge	Sai Tamhankar, Ajinkya Deo, Tushar Dalvi	Mystery / Drama	
F E B	28	Akalpith	Prasad Acharekar	Mohan Agashe, Nirmiti Sawant, Renuka Shahane	Horror, Thriller	
M A R	7	Dhag	Shivaji Lotan Patil	Upendra Limaye, Usha Jadhav, Nagesh Bhosale	Drama	
M A R	14	Hello Nandan	Rahul Jadhav	Adinath Kothare, Mrunal Thakur	Thriller	
M A R	28	Taptapadi	Sachin Nagargoje	Veena Jamkar, Kashyap Parulekar, Shruti Marathe, Neena Kulkarni, Sharad Ponkshe, Ashwini Ekbote, Ambarish Deshpande	Drama	

== April – June ==
	Opening	Title	Director	Cast	Genre	Source
A P R	4	Yellow	Vikram shejwal	Mrinal Kulkarni, Upendra Limaye, Hrishikesh Joshi, Manoj Joshi, Aishwarya Narkar	Drama	
A P R	11					
A P R	18	Surajya	Santosh Manjrekar	Vaibbhav Tatwawdi, Mrunal Thakur, Sharad Ponkshe	Drama	
A P R	25	Postcard	Gajendra Ahire	Girish Kulkarni, Kishor Kadam, Subodh Bhave, Vaibhav Mangale, Sai Tamhankar, Vibhavari Deshpande, Radhika Apte, Suhita Thatte, Dilip Prabhavalkar	Drama	
A P R	25	Dhamak	Rajendra Bandivadekar	Aniket Vishwasrao, Girija Joshi, Mohan Joshi, Ashok Samarth, Viju Khote, Jayant Wadkar, Vidhyadhar Joshi, Uma Sardeshmukh	Action, Drama	
M A Y	2	Dusari Goshta	Chandrakant Kulkarni	Siddharth Chandekar, Neha Pendse, Vikram Gokhale	Drama	
M A Y	2	Salaam (2014 film)	Kiran Yadnyopavit	Girish Kulkarni, Kishor Kadam, Sanjay Khapre, Jyoti Chandekar, Atisha Naik	Drama	
M A Y	9	Ek Hazarachi Note	Shrihari Sathe	Usha Naik, Sandeep Pathak, Ganesh Yadav, Shrikant Yadav, Pooja Nayak	Drama	
M A Y	9	Ajoba	Sujay Dahake	Urmila Matondkar, Hrishikesh Joshi, Dilip Prabhavalkar, Neha Mahajan	Drama, Adventure, Thriller	
M A Y	9	Bhakarkhadi 7 km	Umesh Namjoshi	Aniket Vishwasrao, Veena Jamakar, Apurva Nemalekar	Drama	
M A Y	16	Misal Pav (The Movie)	Vishvjit Masal	Anshuman Vichare, Vijay Chavan, Viju Khote	Comedy	
M A Y	23	Aandhali Koshimbir	Aditya Ingale	Ashok Saraf, Vandana Gupte, Aniket Vishwasrao	Comedy	
M A Y	23	Hututu	Kaanchan Adhikkari	Kanchan Adhikari, Hemant Dhome, Jitendra Joshi	Comedy	
J U N	6					
J U N	13					
J U N	20	Daptar - The School Bag	Pundalik Dhumal	Tom Alter, Yash Shah, Tanvi Kamat, Abhay Kamat	Family	
J U N	27	Mukkam Post Dhanori	Sudarshan Warale	Niyati Ghate, Prakash Dhotre, Priya Gamre, Yogesh Shinde	Thriller	

== July – September ==
	Opening	Title	Director	Cast	Genre	Source
J U L	4					
J U L	11	Lai Bhaari	Nishikant Kamat	Ritesh Deshmukh, Radhika Apte, Aaditi Pohankar		
J U L	18					
J U L	19					
J U L	25	Anvatt	Gajendra Ahire	Adinath Kothare, Urmila Kanetkar, Makarand Anaspure	Thriller	
A U G	1	Astu		Mohan Agashe, Milind Soman, Amruta Subhash	Drama	
A U G	1	Poshter Boyz	Sameer Patil	Aniket Vishwasrao, Dilip Prabhavalkar, Hrishikesh Joshi	Comedy	
A U G	8	Rama Madhav	Mrinal Kulkarni	Ravindra Mankani, Mrinal Kulkarni	Historical	
A U G	15	Rege	Abhijeet Panase	Mahesh Manjrekar, Pushkar Shrotri, Santosh Juvekar	Crime	
A U G	15	Vaadhdivsachya Haardik Shubhechcha	Deepak Naidu	Ankush Choudhary, Madhu Sharma, Pushkar Shrotri	Comedy	
A U G	20	Sunrise	Partho Sen-Gupta	Adil Hussain, Tannishtha Chatterjee	Drama	
A U G	22					
S E P	5					
S E P	12	Gulabi	Guddu Dhanoa	Sachin Khedekar, Pakhi Hegde, Vineet Sharma, Vinay Apte, Jaspal Sandhu	Drama	
S E P	12	Guru Pournima	Girish Mohite	Upendra Limaye, Sai Tamhankar, Sulbha Arya	Drama, Romance	
S E P	12	Aamhi Bolato Marathi	Anand Mhasvekar	Vikram Gokhale, Anand Mhasvekar, Arun Nalawade	Drama, Romance	
S E P	19	Nati	Yogesh Jaadhav	Teja Devkar, Ajinkya Deo, Subodh Bhave	Biopic	
S E P	19	Por Bazaar	Manava Naik	Ankush Chaudhari, Sai Tamhankar, Swarangi Marathe, Satya Manjrekar, Anurag Worlikar, Dharmaj Joshi, Sakheel Parchure	Thriller	
S E P	26	Baavare Prem He	Ajay Naik	Siddharth Chandekar, Urmila Kanitkar	Musical, Romance	
S E P	26	Tapaal	Laxman Utekar	Nandu Madhav, Veena Jamkar, Urmila Kanitkar	Drama	
S E P	26	Raakhandaar	Mrunalinni Patil	Ajinkya Deo, Jitendra Joshi, Anuja Sathe	Drama	

== October – December ==
	Opening	Title	Director	Cast	Genre	Source
O C T	2	Sanngto Aika	Satish Rajwade	Sachin Pilgaonkar, Vaibhav Mangle, Milind Shinde	Comedy, Drama	
O C T	10	Dr. Prakash baba Amte	Samruddhi Porey	Nana Patekar, Sonali Kulkarni	Biopic	
O C T	10	Ishq Wala Love	Renu Desai	Adinath Kothare, Sulagna Panigrahi	Romance	
O C T	10	Punha Gondhal Punha Mujra	Balkrushna Shinde	Makarand Anaspure, Sayaji Shinde	Comedy	
O C T	24	Pyaar Vali Love Story	Sanjay Jadhav	Swapnil Joshi, Sai Tamhankar, Urmila Kanitkar, Sameer Dharmadhikari, Upendra Limaye	Comedy, Romance	
O C T	31					
N O V	7					
N O V	14	Elizabeth Ekadashi	Paresh Mokashi	Shrirang Mahajan, Sayali Bhandarkar, Pushkar Lonarkar, Nandita Dhuri	Comedy, Drama	
N O V	14	Dhyaas 3D	Mandar Shinde	Suhas Palshikar	Circus, Drama, 3D	
N O V	21	Vitti Dandu	Ganesh Kadam	Dilip Prabhavalkar, Ashok Samarth, Mrunal Thakur, Ravindra Mankani	Drama, Action	
N O V	21	Mamachya Gavala Jaaoo Yaa	Sameer Joshi	Abhijeet Khandkekar, Mrunmayee Deshpande	Comedy, Thriller	
N O V	28	Happy Journey	Sachin Kundalkar	Atul Kulkarni, Priya Bapat, Pallavi Subhash, Siddharth Menon	Drama, Comedy, Road Movie	
N O V	28	Swami Public Ltd.	Gajendra Ahire	Subodh Bhave, Vikram Gokhale, Chinmay Mandalekar, Vinay Apte, Saunskruti Kher	Drama, Thriller	
D E C	5	Candle March (film)	Sachin Dev	Manva Naik, Tejaswini Pandit, Smita Tambe	Drama	
D E C	12	Premasathi Coming Suun	Ved Prakash	Adinath Kothare, Jitendra Joshi, Neha Pendse, Resham Tipnis, Vijay Patkar, Suhas Joshi, Anchal Poddar	Romcom	
D E C	12	Madhyamvarg: The Middle Class	Hari Fernandes	Siddharth Jadhav, Ravi Kishan, Kashmira Kulkarni	Action	
D E C	12	Miss Match	Girish Vasaikar	Bhushan Pradhan, Mrinmai Kolwalkar, Uday Tikekar	Romance	
D E C	14	Love Factor: Premachi Trilogy	Kishor Vibhandik	Rajesh Shringarpure, Khushboo Tawde	Romance	
D E C	26	Avatarachi Goshta	Nitin Dixit	Ashish Vidyarthi, Adinath Kothare, Leena Bhagwat, Mihiresh Joshi	Comedy, Drama	
D E C	26	IPL The Film	Deepak Kadam	Swapnil Joshi, Santosh Mayekar, Shital K Upare, Kshitija Ghosalkar, Vijay Patkar	Comedy	

== See also ==
- List of Marathi films of 2015
