= Mayur Hardas =

Indian film editor and cinematographer

- Education: Savitribai Phule Pune University
- Known for: Cinematography; Film Editing

Mayur Hardas is an Indian Cinematographer and Editor who predominantly works in Marathi Film Industry. He was nominated for the filmfare award for best editing for Chowk (2023).

== Career ==
He made his directorial debut with the movie DarkLight, which was screened at the 25th edition of Kolkata International Film Festival.

== Filmography ==
=== Films ===
Year	Film	Editor	Cinematograher	Notes	Ref
2013	Postcard	Yes	No		
2014	Anvatt	Yes	No		
2014	Swami Public Ltd	Yes	No		
2014	Avatarachi Goshta	Yes	No		
2015	Coffee Ani Barach Kahi	Yes	No		
2015	Siddhant	Yes	Yes		
2015	Bioscope	Yes	No		
2015	The Silence	Yes	No		
2015	Deool Band	Yes	No		
2016	Mr. and Mrs. Sadachari	Yes	No		
2016	& Jara Hatke	Yes	No		
2017	Ranjan	Yes	No		
2017	TTMM – Tujha Tu Majha Mi	Yes	Yes		
2017	Maza Bhirbhira	Yes	No		
2018	Hostel Days	Yes	No		
2018	Rakshas	Yes	Yes		
2018	Cycle	Yes	No		
2018	Pipsi: a bottle of hope	Yes	No		
2018	Gatmat	Yes	No		
2018	Mulshi Pattern	Yes	No		
2019	Triple Seat	Yes	No		
2020	AB Aani CD	Yes	No		
2020	Ateet	Yes	No		
2022	Dharmaveer	Yes	No		
2022	Sarsenapati Hambirrao	Yes	No		
2023	Maharastra Shahir	Yes	No		
2023	Baloch	Yes	Yes		
2023	Chowk	Yes	Yes	Nominated for Filmfare Award	
2023	Baipan Bhaari Deva	Yes	No		
2023	Territory	Yes	No		
2023	Kaushaljis VS Kaushal	Yes	No		
2024	Aaichya Gavat Marathit Bol	Yes	No		
2024	Shaktiman	Yes	No		
2024	Dharmveer 2	Yes	No		
2024	Yek Number	Yes	No		
2024	Phullwanti	Yes	No		
2024	Paani	Yes	No	Best Film on Environment/Conservation/Preservation	
2024	Sadabahar	Yes	No		
2025	Gulkand	Yes	No		
2025	Vadapav	Yes	No		
2026	Aga Aga Sunbai! Kay Mhantay Sasubai?	Yes	Yes		

=== Web Series ===
Year	Title	Platform	Role	Ref
2018	Date with saie	Zee5	Editor	
2019	Modi: Journey of a Common Man	Prime Video	Editor	
2019	Gondya Ala Re	Zee5	Editor	

=== Shortfilms ===
Year	Title	Notes	Ref
2020	Aashechi Roshnai		
2022	Jakkal	National Award for Best Investigative Documentary	
2022	Soch		
