= Lux Jhakkas Heroine =

- Genre: Reality, Talent hunt
- Directed by: Ajay Khurpe
- Creative director: Sandeep Jagam
- Presented by: Siddharth Chandekar
- Judges: Swapnil Joshi, Sonalee Kulkarni, Umesh Jadhav, Ravi Jadhav, Phulwa Khamkar
- Country of origin: India
- Original language: Marathi
- No. of seasons: 2
- No. of episodes: 6

Production
- Producers: Arjun Baran, Kartik Nishandar
- Cinematography: Avinash Kumar
- Editor: Priyanka Sanas

Original release
- Network: 9X Jhakaas
- Release: 2014 – present

Related
- Mitwaa

Lux Jhakkas Heroine is a Marathi-language reality television talent hunt that aired on 9X Jhakaas in 2014. The series was organized to discover new female acting talent, specifically to cast the lead heroine for the Marathi romantic film Mitwaa. The show ran for two seasons, featuring open auditions, performance challenges, and competitive eliminations.

== Format ==
Aspiring actresses from across Maharashtra participated via state-wide auditions, online submissions, and on-ground events. Thousands of entries were narrowed to a Top 60, then a Top 30, who underwent on-screen performance, grooming, and personality rounds. Contestants were evaluated weekly on acting, dance, screen presence, and adaptability. Judges and mentors from the film industry announced eliminations, leading to a grand finale.

== History ==
=== Season 1 ===
The inaugural season took place in 2014, focusing on casting for Mitwaa. Multi-stage auditions and competitive tasks reflected real-world film scenarios. The Top 10 finalists participated in intensive studio-based and on-location challenges.

=== Season 2 ===
After Season 1 and the success of Mitwaa, the show returned for a second season, continuing the format to unearth new talent for Marathi films.

== Key Participants ==
Notable Top 10 contestants included:

- Prarthana Behere (winner)
- Sayali Sanjeev
- Rasika Sunil
- Sheetal Pandya
- Ketaki Mangale
- Sneha Chauhan
- Deepyasha
- Aishwarya Gorewar
- Sneha Ubil
- Amruta Piyare

== Judges and Host ==
- Host: Siddharth Chandekar
- Judges: Swapnil Joshi, Sonalee Kulkarni, Umesh Jadhav, Ravi Jadhav, Phulwa Khamkar, among other Marathi cinema personalities

== Production ==
- Business Head: Puneet Pandey
- Network Head: Amar Tidke
- Channel Head: Rohan Rane
- Writer: Pralhad
- Creative Director: Sandeep Jagam
- Director & Project Head: Ajay Khurpe
- Project Manager: Abhijeet Naik
- Editor: Priyanka Sanas
- Director of Photography: Avinash Kumar
- Producers: Arjun Baran, Kartik Nishandar

== Episodes and Availability ==
Season 1 featured six episodes covering the full journey from auditions to the grand finale. The series aired on 9X Jhakaas.

== Impact and Legacy ==
Winner Prarthana Behere was cast as the lead heroine Avani in Mitwaa, marking her entry in Marathi cinema. Fellow contestants such as Sayali Sanjeev, Rasika Sunil, and Sheetal Pandya also achieved subsequent recognition in the Marathi entertainment industry.

== Mitwaa (film) ==
Mitwaa is a 2015 Marathi romance film directed by Swapna Waghmare Joshi and starring Swapnil Joshi, Sonalee Kulkarni, and Prarthana Behere, who was selected via Lux Jhakkas Heroine.
