= Anjana Sukhani =

Indian actress and model (born 1978)

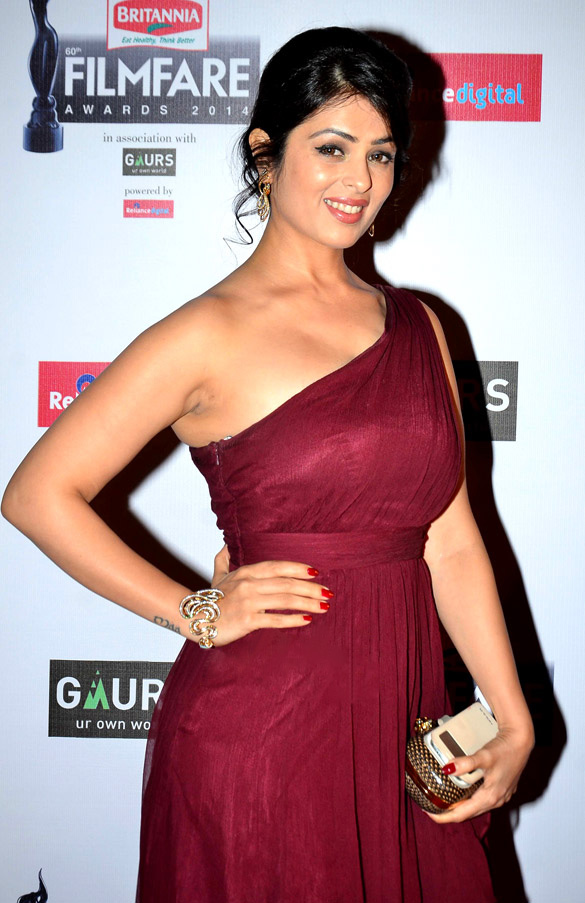
- Sukhani at 59th Filmfare Awards
- Pronunciation: [əɲd͡ʒənaː sʊkʰaːɳiː]
- Born: 10 December 1978 (age 47); Jaipur, Rajasthan, India
- Education: Cardiff Metropolitan University
- Occupations: Actress, model
- Years active: 2002–present

Anjana Sukhani (Sindhi pronunciation: [əɲd͡ʒənaː sʊkʰaːɳiː]; born 10 December 1978) is an Indian actress and model, who predominantly appears in Hindi and a few Telugu films and one Kannada film.

== Early life ==
Anjana was born on 10 December 1978 to a Sindhi Hindu family in Jaipur, to Preethi and Om Sukhani and has an older brother. She received her master's degree from Cardiff Metropolitan University.

== Film and modelling career ==
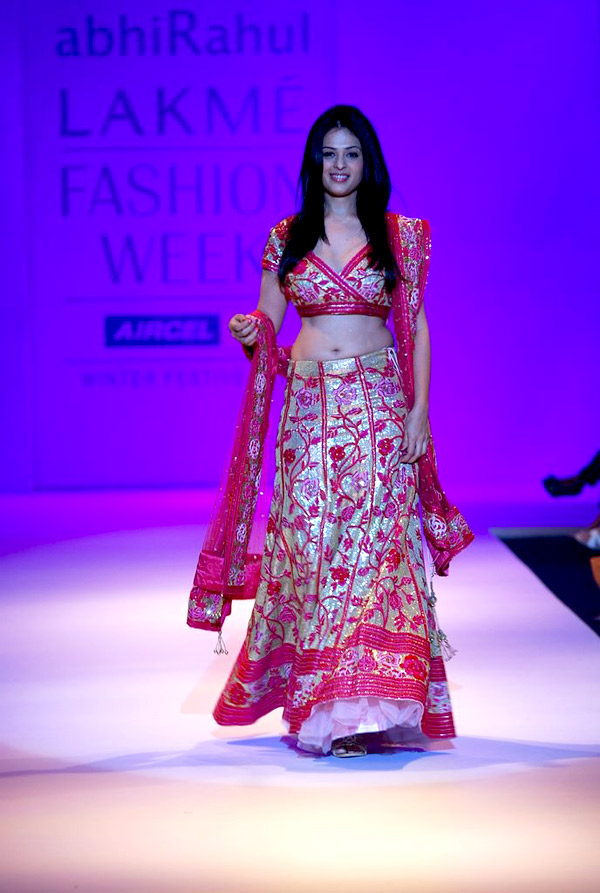
Anjana Sukhani walking the ramp at Lakme Fashion Week

Sukhani put her academic pursuits behind to pursue acting. During the early years of her career, she was cast in a television advertisement for Cadbury Dairy Milk chocolates alongside the Bollywood superstar Amitabh Bachchan. She was also noted for her performance in the remixed Hindi music video for the song Ghar Jayegi. Even though she does not have a film industry background, she has landed sizeable roles, such as in the 2007 multi-starrer blockbuster film Salaam-e-Ishq, following which she starred in Golmaal Returns, a sequel to the 2006 hit film Golmaal. Her other releases were Jai Veeru, Jashnn and her Kannada debut film Maleyali Jotheyali alongside Ganesh and Yuvika Chaudhary. She was cast in Tollywood actor Ravi Teja's film Don Seenu marking her second film in Telugu after Naa Oopiri (2005). In 2016, Anjana made her debut in Marathi cinema opposite Swapnil Joshi in Laal Ishq, a Sanjay Leela Bhansali Production directed by Swapna Waghmare Joshi.

== Filmography ==
Key
†	Denotes films that have not yet been released

Year	Film	Role	Language	Notes
2005	Hum Dum	Rutu Joshi	Hindi	credited as Anjana
2005	Naa Oopiri	Madhu	Telugu	credited as Anjana
2006	Sun Zarra	Trisha	Hindi	credited as Anjana
2006	Jaana: Let's Fall in Love	Madhu Sukhani	Hindi	
2007	Salaam-e-Ishq: A Tribute to Love	Anjali	Hindi	
2008	Sunday	Ritu	Hindi	
2008	De Taali	Anita	Hindi	Special appearance
2008	Golmaal Returns	Daisy Paschisia	Hindi	
2009	Jai Veeru	Divya	Hindi	
2009	Jashnn	Sara	Hindi	
2009	Maleyali Jotheyali	Sandhya	Kannada	Nominated – Filmfare Award for Best Supporting Actress – Kannada
2010	Tum Milo Toh Sahi	Shalini Kasbekar	Hindi	
2010	Don Seenu	Priya	Telugu	
2010	Allah Ke Banday	Sandhya	Hindi	
2012	Department	Bharati	Hindi	
2012	Maximum		Hindi	
2012	Kamaal Dhamaal Malamaal		Hindi	Cameo in song
2013	Saheb, Biwi Aur Gangster Returns		Hindi	Special appearance
2013	Young Malang	Kiran	Punjabi	
2015	Shaandaar	Mrs. Fundwani	Hindi	
2015	Laal Ishq	Jahnvi	Marathi	Marathi film debut opposite Swapnil Joshi
2016	Sardaar Ji 2		Punjabi	Special appearance
2017	Coffee with D	Parull	Hindi	As Parull, Arnab's wife
2019	Good Newwz	Richa Ahuja	Hindi	
2021	Mumbai Saga	Sonali Khaitaan	Hindi	
2022	Saas Bahu Achaar Pvt. Ltd.	Manisha	Hindi	Web series
2025	Bada Naam Karenge	Neeta Jaiswal	Hindi	Television series
2026	Main Vaapas Aaunga	Anjana Grewal	Hindi	

=== TV shows ===
- Fear Factor: Khatron Ke Khiladi on Colors TV

== See also ==
- List of Indian film actresses
