= Sukanya Kulkarni =

Indian actress

Sukanya Kulkarni Mone
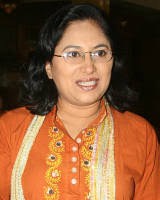
- Kulkarni Mone in 2021
- Born: 23 December 1968 (age 57); Mumbai, India
- Occupation: Actress
- Years active: 1987–present
- Spouse: Sanjay Mone (m. 1998)
- Children: 1

Sukanya Kulkarni Mone (née Kulkarni; born 23 December 1968) is an Indian actress known for her work in Marathi and Hindi cinema, television, and theatre, and is widely regarded as one of the most respected figures in Marathi entertainment. With a career spanning over three decades, she has been acclaimed for her versatility and powerful portrayals of complex female characters across mediums. She has received numerous accolades, including three Maharashtra State Film Awards, a Karnataka State Film Awards, two Filmfare Awards Marathi, a Screen Award Marathi and a Zee Chitra Gaurav Puraskar.

Her artistic journey began on stage with the play Gauri Jhali Durga. She rose to national prominence for her role as Satyabati in Byomkesh Bakshi (1993–1997), and gained recognition in Marathi cinema with award-winning performances in Varsa Laxmicha (1994), Putravati (1996), Sarkarnama (1998) and the Kannada film Pathitha Pavani (1992). She became a household name through memorable serials like Aabhalmaya, Julun Yeti Reshimgathi, and Ghadge & Suun. Alongside her screen work, she has had a prolific career in Marathi theatre, performing in acclaimed plays like Kusum Manohar Lele, Jhulwa, and Naagmandal. In recent years, she has starred in noted films like Ventilator (2016) and Baipan Bhari Deva (2023), both of which earned her nominations for the Filmfare Award for Best Supporting Actress.

She is married to actor-director Sanjay Mone, with whom she has a daughter.

== Early life ==
Kulkarni, born on 23 December 1968 in Mumbai, Maharashtra, into a Marathi family, spent her early years in Dadar, completing her schooling at Balmohan Vidyamandir under the guidance of noted mentors Vidya Patwardhan and Sulabha Deshpande and later graduated from D. G. Ruparel College. During this period, she trained in Bharatanatyam under her gurus Sucheta Bhide Chapekar and Smita Sathe Mahajan, and made her theatrical debut with the play Gauri Jhali Durga, which marked the start of her acting journey.

== Career ==
Kulkarni made her screen debut in 1987 with a brief role in the Marathi comedy Premasathi Vattel Te, followed by a supporting role in K. Viswanath’s Hindi film Eeshwar (1989), where she played Anil Kapoor’s sister—a role she was offered on the recommendation of her mentor, Sulabha Deshpande. She went on to appear in Marathi films like Chambu Gabale (1989) and Eka Peksha Ek (1990), opposite Laxmikant Berde.

The early 1990s marked a pivotal phase in her career as she entered television with Vijaya Mehta's medical drama Lifeline (1991) on DD National, portraying a rape survivor. Her major breakthrough arrived with the iconic series Byomkesh Bakshi (1993–1997), directed by Basu Chatterjee. In this highly acclaimed show based on Sharadindu Bandyopadhyay’s novels, she portrayed Satyabati Bakshi, the wife of the titular detective (played by Rajit Kapur), which brought her widespread recognition.

In 1992, Kulkarni made her Kannada film debut in Aruna Raje’s Pathitha Pavani, her performance was well received and awarded the Karnataka State Film Award for Best Supporting Actress. That same year, she starred in the Marathi film Jagavegali Paij opposite Ajinkya Deo, playing a school teacher who sacrifices her love for his betterment, and also took on a negative role in Taichya Bangadya. Her major breakthrough in Marathi cinema came in 1994 with Varsa Laxmicha, where she portrayed a naïve, newlywed village woman, a performance that won her the Filmfare Award Marathi for Best Actress. That year, she also appeared in the popular television series Shanti, playing a young woman struggling with depression caused by the absence of her mother.

Continuing her success, she delivered a critically acclaimed performance in Putravati (1996), a film about a troubled marriage, infertility struggles, and family rejection. Her portrayal won her the Maharashtra State Film Award for Best Actress, a Screen Award, and a Filmfare nomination. She reunited with Ajinkya Deo in Shrabani Deodhar’s political drama Sarkarnama, won her second Filmfare Award for Best Actress. From 1999 to 2003, she played Professor Sudha Joshi in the widely acclaimed television series Aabhalmaya on Alpha TV, depicting a woman whose husband has an extramarital affair and a daughter with another woman. The show was both critically acclaimed and popular with audiences. She continued to appear in popular serials including Vadalvaat, Agnishikha, and Eka Lagnachi Dusri Goshta, consistently earning praise.

Alongside her screen career, Kulkarni has made significant contributions to Marathi theatre, collaborating with prominent figures such as Dr. Shriram Lagoo, Ashok Saraf, Dr. Girish Oak, Vijay Kenkre, and Vasant Kanetkar. She went on to perform in acclaimed productions such as Kusum Manohar Lele, based on real story of a woman who is under false hopes; Jhulwa, about nuanced exploration of rural and gender issues were widely appreciated; and Naagmandal, based on Girish Karnad’s mythological exploration of identity and desire. Her work in plays like Ti Phulrani, Charchaughi, Janmagath, Lekure Udand Jhali, Akhercha Sawal, and Selfie demonstrated her versatility and deep-rooted presence in Marathi theatre, with roles ranging from deep psychological dramas to contemporary social commentaries.

On television, she earned accolades for her portrayal of Maai in Zee Marathi’s Julun Yeti Reshimgathi, the strong-willed matriarch of the Desai family. Her performance alongside Lalit Prabhakar and Prajakta Mali won her the Zee Marathi Utsav Natyancha Awards for Best Mother and Best Mother-in-law in 2014. She continued to star in several successful serials including Chukbhul Dyavi Ghyavi (2017), Ghadge & Suun (2017-2019), and Aga Aga Sunbai Kay Mhanta Sasubai? (2022-2023).

In cinema, she made an appearance in Ram Gopal Varma’s Rakta Charitra (2010), where she played Radhika Apte’s mother. In 2016, she starred in the family drama Ventilator, directed by Rajesh Mapuskar and produced by Priyanka Chopra. Her portrayal of a spiritually inclined sister with a deep emotional bond to her ailing father was praised by both critics and audiences. Critic Gulshankumar Wankar of Hindustan Times wrote, “Kulkarni Mone and Jitendra Joshi play their characters of Gaju Kaka’s children to perfection.” The film was a critical and commercial success, grossing over ₹25 crore (US$2.7 million) worldwide, and earned her a Filmfare Award nomination for Best Supporting Actress. Kulkarni’s biggest commercial success to date came with Baipan Bhari Deva (2023), directed by Kedar Shinde and co-starring Rohini Hattangadi, Vandana Gupte, Shilpa Navalkar, Suchitra Bandekar, and Deepa Parab. The film, exploring the emotional complexities and shared bond of six sisters, became a cultural blockbuster and grossed over ₹92 crore (US$9.8 million) worldwide, making it the second-highest-grossing Marathi film of all time. Her performance was hailed by critics, with Maharashtra Times reviewer Kalpeshraj Kubal praising her "incredible energy" on screen. She received several award nominations, including Filmfare, Maharashtra State Film Award and Maharashtracha Favourite Kon?, and won the Zee Chitra Gaurav Puraskar for Best Actress.

In 2024, she appeared in three films: Janma Runn, a socially-driven family drama inspired by real-life events, in which she portrayed a mother who files an FIR against her son for abandoning his parents; Nach Ga Ghuma, directed by Paresh Mokashi, where she played the role of Mukta Barve's mother; and Bai Ga, in which she appeared as one of the wives of Swapnil Joshi’s character. Notably, Nach Ga Ghuma became the highest-grossing Marathi film of the year.

== Personal life ==
Kulkarni met veteran Marathi actor and director Sanjay Mone through mutual acquaintances, and despite a nine-year age difference, the two developed a close bond and married in 1998, after which she adopted the surname Mone and became professionally known as Sukanya Kulkarni Mone

The couple’s journey was marked by resilience, as a few years into their marriage, Kulkarni suffered an accident resulting in partial paralysis of her right limb, and during several months of bed rest, she also faced thyroid-related issues and significant weight gain. Although doctors advised against conception and both her husband and mother-in-law discouraged it, she remained steadfast in her desire to become a mother, ultimately taking what she described as “a last chance” and giving birth to Julia, whom she calls her "miracle child." Julia is currently pursuing higher education in Australia, specializing in animal science with a major in wildlife biology, and has made her acting debut by portraying the younger version of her mother’s character in the 2023 Marathi film Baipan Bhaari Deva.

== Filmography ==
=== Films ===
Year	Title	Role	Language	Notes
1987	Premasathi Vattel Te	Sukanya	Marathi	
1988	Halla Gulla	Vasanti	Marathi	
1989	Eeshwar	Chutki	Hindi	
1989	Chambu Gabale	Sukanya	Marathi	
1990	Eka Peksha Ek	Manda Mahimkar	Marathi	
1991	Vedh	Shilpa	Marathi	
1992	Pathitha Pavani		Kannada	
1992	Jigar	Rama	Hindi	
1992	Jagavegali Paij	Vidya	Marathi	
1993	Parwane	Maria D'Souza	Hindi	
1993	Taichya Bangadya	Shalaka	Marathi	
1994	Varsa Laxmicha	Laxmi	Marathi	
1996	Putravati	Swati	Marathi	
1998	Sarkarnama	Renu Pawar	Marathi	
1999	Aai Thor Tujhe Upkar	Sharda's Daughter-in-law	Marathi	
1999	Ghe Bharari	Kamla	Marathi	
1999	Pathrai Aankhon Ke Sapne		Hindi	Television film
1999	Sarfarosh	Ajay's Bhabhi	Hindi	
1999	Tuch Majhi Aai	Cop	Marathi	
2001	Maya	Maya	Hindi	
2007	Saade Maade Teen	Ratan's ex-girlfriend	Marathi	
2008	Guilty		Marathi	
2009	Aamras	Mrs. Sarang	Marathi	
2009	Ek Daav Dhobi Pachhad	Mrs. Dhande	Marathi	
2010	Rakta Charitra	Nandini's mother	Hindi/Telugu	
2014	Ishq Wala Love	Ajinkya's mother	Marathi	
2016	Ventilator	Sarika	Marathi	
2017	Ti Saddhya Kay Karte	Anuraag's mother	Marathi	
2020	Ekaant	Sudha	Marathi	Short film
2023	Baipan Bhaari Deva	Sadhana	Marathi	
2024	Janma Runn	Vasudha	Marathi	
2024	Nach Ga Ghuma	Vandana	Marathi	
2024	Bai Ga	Putlabai	Marathi	
2025	Bin Lagnachi Goshta	Ashay's mother	Marathi	

=== Television ===
Year	Title	Role	Language	Channel	Notes
1991	Lifeline		Hindi	DD National	
1993–1997	Byomkesh Bakshi	Satyabati Bakshi	Hindi	DD National	
1994	Shanti	Maya	Hindi	DD National	
1995	Zameen Aasman		Hindi	DD National	
1996–1997	Dharm Adharm		Hindi	DD National	
1998	Woh	Radhika	Hindi	DD National	
1999	Bandhan	Ayesha's mother	Hindi	DD Metro	
1999–2003	Aabhalmaya	Sudha Joshi	Marathi	Alpha TV Marthi	
2003–2006	Vadalvaat	Vaijayanti Barve-Mujumdar	Marathi	Zee Marathi	
2003–2005	Kkusum	Mr. Sukanya	Hindi	SET India	
2004	Chakravyuh Ek Sangharsh	Arundhati Sapre	Marathi	Alpha TV Marthi	
2006	Agnishikha		Marathi	ETV Marathi	
2007–2009	Kalat Nakalat	Sadhana Pathak	Marathi	Zee Marathi	
2009	Basera	Ketaki's mother	Hindi	Imagine TV	
2010–2014	Lajja		Marathi	Zee Marathi	
2011	Rang Badalti Odhani	Gangu Bai	Hindi	STAR One	
2012	Eka Lagnachi Dusri Goshta	Prachi Atya	Marathi	Zee Marathi	
2013	Aaradhana	Sulabha	Marathi	Star Pravah	
2013–2014	Savar Re		Marathi	ETV Marathi	
2013–2015	Julun Yeti Reshimgathi	Sanjivani Nana Desai (Maai)	Marathi	Zee Marathi	
2017	Chukbhul Dyavi Ghyavi	Malati Joshi	Marathi	Zee Marathi	
2017–2019	Ghadge & Suun	Sadhana Ghadge (Mai)	Marathi	Colors Marathi	
2020–2021	Shubhmangal Online	Anupama Sadavarte	Marathi	Colors Marathi	
2022	Ase He Sundar Aamche Ghar	Subhadra Rajpatil	Marathi	Sony Marathi	
2022–2023	Aga Aga Sunbai Kay Mhanta Sasubai?	Sarita Mantri	Marathi	Zee Marathi	
2025–2026	Kon Hotis Tu, Kay Zalis Tu!	Sulakshana Dharmadhikari	Marathi	Star Pravah	
2025–2026	Baipan Zindabad		Marathi	Colors Marathi	

=== Web series ===
- Anuradha as Prabhavati (2021)

=== Theatre ===
- Gauri Jhali Durga
- Jhulwa
- Janmagath
- Kusum Manohar Lele
- Naagmandal
- Sangam
- Ti Phulrani
- Charchaughi
- Lekure Udand Jhali
- Akhercha Sawal
- Selfie
- Aata Thambvaicha Kasa

== Awards ==
Year	Awards	Category	Work	Result	Ref.
1992	Karnataka State Film Awards	Best Supporting Actress	Pathitha Pavani	Won	
1994	Filmfare Awards Marathi	Best Actress	Varsa Laxmicha	Won	
1996	Screen Awards	Best Actress – Marathi	Putravati	Won	
1996	Maharashtra State Film Awards	Best Actress	Putravati	Won	
1997	Filmfare Awards Marathi	Best Actress	Putravati	Nominated	
1997	Filmfare Awards Marathi	Best Actress	Sarkarnama	Won	
1999	Maharashtra State Film Awards	Special Jury Award	Sarkarnama	Won	
1999	Maharashtra State Film Awards	Best Supporting Actress	Ghe Bharari	Won	
2004	Zee Marathi Utsav Natyancha Awards	Best Supporting Character	Chakravyuh Ek Sangharsh	Nominated	
2014	Zee Marathi Utsav Natyancha Awards	Best Mother	Julun Yeti Reshimgathi	Won	
2014	Zee Marathi Utsav Natyancha Awards	Best Mother-in-law	Julun Yeti Reshimgathi	Won	
2016	Filmfare Awards Marathi	Best Supporting Actress	Ventilator	Nominated	
2018	Maharashtra Times Sanman Awards	Best Actress in a Supporting Role	Ghadge & Suun	Won	
2019	Colors Marathi Awards	Favourite Mother-in-law	Ghadge & Suun	Won	
2019	Colors Marathi Awards	Favourite Mother	Shubhmangal Online	Won	
2023	TV9 Aapla Bioscope Awards	Best Actress in a Supporting Role	Baipan Bhaari Deva	Won	
2024	Maharashtracha Favourite Kon	Special Mention	Baipan Bhaari Deva	Won	
2024	Maharashtracha Favourite Kon	Favourite Actress	Baipan Bhaari Deva	Nominated	
2024	Maharashtra Times Sanman Awards	Special Recognition Award	Baipan Bhaari Deva	Won	
2024	City Cine Awards	The Game Changer	Baipan Bhaari Deva	Nominated	
2024	Zee Chitra Gaurav Puraskar	Best Actress	Baipan Bhaari Deva	Won	
2024	Filmfare Awards Marathi	Best Supporting Actress	Baipan Bhaari Deva	Nominated	
2024	Maharashtra State Film Awards	Best Supporting Actress	Baipan Bhaari Deva	Nominated	
