= Bai Ga =

2024 Indian Marathi-language film

- बाई गं
- Directed by: Pandurang Jadhav
- Written by: Pandurang Jadhav
- Produced by: Dr. Ashish Agarwal; Nitin Prakash Vaidya
- Starring: Swapnil Joshi; Prarthana Behere; Sukanya Kulkarni Mone; Aditi Sarangdhar; Deepti Devi; Namrata Gaikwad; Neha Khan
- Cinematography: Nagraj M.D.
- Edited by: Nilesh Gawand
- Music by: Varun Likhate
- Production companies: ABC Creation; Indradhanush Motion Pictures; Nitin Prakash Vaidya Productions; OMG Media Ventures
- Release date: 12 July 2024
- Running time: Panorama Studios
- Country: India
- Language: Marathi

Bai Ga (transl. Oh Woman) is a 2024 Indian Marathi-language comedy fantasy film written and directed by Pandurang Jadhav. The film stars Swapnil Joshi, Sukanya Kulkarni Mone, Prarthana Behere, Aditi Sarangdhar, Deepti Devi, Namrata Gaikwad and Neha Khan.

It was theatrically released on 12 July 2024. It received a mixed response from critics and audiences and underperformed at the box office.

== Plot ==
When Dhanush questions God about why his life with his wife Aboli is not going well, he comes to realize that he has mistreated his wives across five previous lives. Given a celestial opportunity to make amends, God allows the wives from Dhanush's past lives to re-enter his present life. The film follows Dhanush's humorous and emotional journey of redemption, exploring themes of love, regret, and self-realization.

== Cast ==
- Swapnil Joshi as Dhanush
- Prarthana Behere as Aboli
- Sukanya Kulkarni Mone as Putlabai
- Aditi Sarangdhar as Asawari
- Deepti Devi as Anamika
- Namrata Gaikwad as Shruti
- Neha Khan as Jenny
- Sameer Dharmadhikari as Indra Dev
- Sagar Karande as Shyamrao

== Production ==
Swapnil Joshi and Prarthana Behere collaborated after nine years following their successful venture, Mitwaa (2015).

== Release ==
Bai Ga was released theatrically in India on 12 July 2024.

=== Box office ===
Bai Ga collected a total worldwide gross of approximately ₹1.09 crore, with an India net collection of ₹0.97 crore.

== Soundtrack ==
The music was composed by Varun Likhate.

Tracklisting
No.	Title	Lyrics	Singer(s)	Length
1.	"Bai Ga – Title Track"	Mandar Cholkar	Avadhoot Gupte, Kavita Raam, Mugdha Karhade, Sharayu Date, Shweta Dandekar, Susmirata Dawalkar, Sanchita Morajkar	2:28
2.	"Chand Thambla"	Sameer Samant	Abhay Jodhpurkar, Aanandi Joshi	3:08
3.	"Mi Gori Gori Paan"	Varun Likhate	Pawni Pandey, Varun Likhate	3:38
4.	"Vaghacha Doggy"	Jai Atre	Nakash Aziz, Wrisha Dutta	3:01
5.	"Shambhar Numberi Jodi"	Mandar Cholkar	Nakash Aziz	3:22
6.	"Chand Thambla 2.0"	Sameer Samant	Abhay Jodhpurkar, Aanandi Joshi	3:24
Total length:				19:02

== Reception ==
Anup George of The Times of India gave the film Bai Ga 3 stars, writing that it “holds no airs of being a socially conscious film.”
