= Laal Ishq (film) =

- Directed by: Swapna Waghmare Joshi
- Written by: Shirish Latkar
- Screenplay by: Shirish Latkar
- Produced by: Sanjay Leela Bhansali; Shabina Khan
- Starring: Swwapnil Joshi; Anjana Sukhani; Sneha Chavan
- Cinematography: Prasad Bhende
- Edited by: Jayant Jathar
- Music by: Amitraj; Nilesh Moharir
- Production company: Bhansali Productions
- Distributed by: Bhansali Productions
- Release date: 27 May 2016
- Country: India
- Language: Marathi
- Budget: ₹5−6 crore (US$−620,000)
- Box office: ₹7.37 crore (US$770,000) (5 days)

Laal Ishq is a 2016 Indian Marathi-language romance mystery thriller film, directed by Swapna Waghmare Joshi and produced by Sanjay Leela Bhansali and co-produced by Shabina Khan under the Bhansali Productions banner. The film was scheduled for release on 27 May 2016.

Swwapnil Joshi will be the male lead, while Anjana Sukhani and Sneha Chavan will be in female lead roles respectively. The movie will be debut for Anjana Sukhani in Marathi films.

== Cast ==
- Swwapnil Joshi as Yash Patwardhan
- Anjana Sukhani as Jahnvi
- Sneha Chavan as Shreya
- Samidha Guru as Inspector Ms Nimbalkar
- Kamlesh Sawant as Inspector Kale
- Milind Gawali
- Jayant Wadkar as Poddar
- Priya Berde
- Piyush Ranade as Vinay
- Yashashri Masurkar as Nisha
- Uday Nene

== Plot ==
Laal Ishq is a love story entwined with a murder that takes place in a resort, and the prime suspects for the murder are the two leads of the film.

== Music ==
The Chand Matla Song is composed by Nilesh Moharir and Chimani Chimani and composed by Amitraj. The music rights are acquired by Video Palace.

No.	Title	Lyrics	Music	Singer(s)	Length
1.	"Chand Matla"	Ashwini Shende	Nilesh Moharir	Swapnil Bandodkar, Vaishali Samant	2:18
2.	"Chimani Chimani"	Sachin Pathak	Amitraj	Adarsh Shinde, Amitraj, Swwapnil Joshi, Jayant Wadkar, Piyush Ranade	2:54
34.	Untitled				zuzu
Total length:					4:72

== Box office ==
Laal Ishq opened to good response in Maharashtra. It collected ₹1.34 crore (US$140,000), ₹1.50 crore (US$160,000) and ₹2.02 crore (US$210,000) nett, with the total of ₹4.86 crore (US$500,000) nett and ₹5.45 crore (US$570,000) gross at the box office. The movie net collection ₹7.37 crore (US$770,000) in 5 days.
