= Janma Runn =

2024 Marathi-language film directed by Kanchan Adhikari

- Theatrical release poster
- Directed by: Kanchan Adhikari
- Written by: Kanchan Adhikari; Manjushree Gokhale
- Produced by: Kanchan Adhikkari; Ravi Adhikari; Kailashnath Adhikari
- Starring: Manoj Joshi; Sukanya Kulkarni; RK Tushar; Niharica Raizada
- Cinematography: Suresh Deshmane
- Edited by: Anand Kamat
- Music by: Vaishali Samant
- Production companies: Ganesh Films Production; Sri Adhikari Brothers
- Release date: 22 March 2024
- Country: India
- Language: Marathi

Janma Runn is a 2024 Indian Marathi-language drama film co-written and directed by Kanchan Adhikari and under the banner of Ganesh Films Production and Sri Adhikari Brothers. The film features Manoj Joshi, Sukanya Kulkarni and RK Tushar in the lead roles. The film is inspired by real-life incidents about parents filing an FIR against their son who abandoned them. Upon release, the film received positive reviews, especially for its emotional aspects and performances.

== Plot ==
Dilip gets into an electronic engineering program in Bombay. Before going, he asks his father (Anna) for Rs. 1.50 lakh, but his father only gives him Rs. 10,000, which Dilip refuses.

After finishing his studies, Dilip gets a job in the US. He returns home for a day to ask his father for Rs. 5 lakh, which his father gives him. Dilip then goes to the US.

Eight months later, Dilip comes back and convinces his parents to go to the US with him. He tricks his father into signing over power of attorney instead of visa papers. Dilip misuses this power and never takes his parents to the US.

== Cast ==
- Manoj Joshi as Anna
- Sukanya Kulkarni as Vasudha
- R.K. Tushar as Dilip
- Niharica Raizada
- Anagha Bhagre as Uma
- Sushant Shelar as Ashok Gurav
- Mahesh Thakur
- Sashi Pendse as Vasant Soman
- Kanchan Adhikari

== Production ==
The film is based on Manjushree Gokhale's Marathi novel Avartan and is made on sole intention that children should treat their parents with love and respect. Joshi and Kulkarni, who worked together over twenty years ago in the Marathi cult TV series Aabhalmaya, reunite in this film. It also marks Luxembourgish actress Niharica Raizada Marathi film debut.
