= Aga Aga Sunbai! Kay Mhantay Sasubai? =

2026 Indian film by Kedar Shinde

- Theatrical release poster
- Directed by: Kedar Shinde
- Written by: Vaishali Naik; Omkar Mangesh Datt
- Produced by: Umeshkumar Bansal; Bavesh Janavlekar; Sana Shinde
- Starring: Nirmiti Sawant; Prarthana Behere; Rajan Bhise; Nakul Ghanekar
- Cinematography: Mayur Hardas
- Edited by: Mayur Hardas
- Music by: Kunal Karan; Devdutta Baji; Suraj Dhiraj
- Production companies: Zee Studios; Sunflower Studios
- Release date: 16 January 2026
- Running time: 150 minutes
- Country: India
- Language: Marathi
- Budget: ₹3 crore
- Box office: ₹10 crore

Aga Aga Sunbai! Kay Mhantay Sasubai? is a 2026 Indian Marathi-language drama film directed by Kedar Shinde and produced by Zee Studios and Sunflower Studios. The film stars Nirmiti Sawant, Prarthana Behere, Rajan Bhise, and Nakul Ghanekar in lead roles.

The film was theatrically released on 16 January 2026. The film emerged as commercial success grossed over ₹10 crore worldwide.

== Cast ==
- Nirmiti Sawant as Smita
- Prarthana Behere as Manasvi
- Rajan Bhise as Arun Desai
- Nakul Ghanekar as Saurav
- Abhinay Sawant as Amit
- Swapnil Rajshekhar as Businessman

== Release ==
The film was theatrically released on 16 January 2026. It ran for more than 50 days in theatre.

It was digitally released on 19 March 2026 on ZEE5.

== Critical reception ==
Kalpeshraj Kubal of Maharashtra Times gave 3.5/5 stars and says the music is the heart of the film—the songs add real emotional depth, the visuals feel natural and authentic, and the film succeeds because of its strong emotions, not glamour.

Santosh Bhingarde of Sakal says the film beautifully reuses classic Marathi songs, carefully preserving their soul while giving them a new sound, and that the music strongly supports the story and emotions.

== Soundtrack ==
Track listing
No.	Title	Singer(s)	Length
1.	"Aga Aga Sunbai Kay Mhanata Sasubai"	Vaishali Samant, Priyanka Barve	3:30
2.	"Divas Tuze He Phulauche"	Kunal Ganjawala	2:24
3.	"Daav Modu Nako"	Vaishali Samant, Konkan Kanya	2:16
4.	"Nakshatranche Dene"	Javed Ali	3:21
