= Zee Maharashtra Kusti Dangal =

Indian professional wrestling league

Zee Maharashtra Kusti Dangal (ZMKD)
- Countries: India
- Administrator: Zee Entertainment Enterprises
- First edition: 2018
- Number of teams: 6
- Current champion: Puneri Ustaad

Zee Maharashtra Kusti Dangal (ZMKD) is a professional wrestling league in India, launched on 2 November 2018 and broadcasting on Zee Talkies. Zee Talkies announced the tournament on 12 January 2018 in Mumbai.

== Format ==
Currently, with six teams, each team plays each other twice in the league phase. At the conclusion of the league stage, the top four teams will qualify for the semi-finals. The winners of the semifinal matches will move onto the final to play the ZMKD final match, where the winner will be crowned the Zee Maharashtra Kusti Dangal champions.

== Season 1 ==
The six teams consist of 3 celebrities and 3 dignitaries from different fields, and tournament matches will be held at the Balewadi Stadium in Pune. The first draft event of players for the 6 teams was held on 19 October 2018 in Mumbai.

=== Teams ===
Following the player draft, the names of the final team and their players were announced at the press conference. Swapnil Joshi (Vidharbhache Wagh), Sai Tamhankar (Kolhapuri Mavle), Nagraj Manjule (Veer Marathwada), Purshottam Jadhav (Yashwant Satara), Rajesh Dake (Mumbai Astra) and Shantaram Manve & Paritosh Painter (Puneri Ustad) own six teams in the wrestling tournament.

Teams	Owner(s)
Vidarbhache Wagh	Swapnil Joshi
Kolhapuri Mavle	Sai Tamhankar
Veer Marathwada	Nagraj Manjule
Yashwant Satara	Purshottam Jadhav
Mumbai Astra	Rajesh Dake
Puneri Ustad	Shantaram Manve & Paritosh Painter

== Prize ==
Prize money for the winner of season 1 will be ₹ 50 Lakh. The first and second runners-up will be awarded ₹ 30 lakh and ₹ 20 lakh respectively.
