= Kkehna Hai Kuch Mujhko =

- Genre: Drama
- Created by: Ekta Kapoor
- Written by: Mustaq Shaikh
- Directed by: Swapna Waghmare Joshi
- Starring: See below
- Theme music composer: Vishal–Shekhar
- Opening theme: Kehna Hai Kuch Mujhko by Alka Yagnik
- Country of origin: India
- Original language: Hindi
- No. of seasons: 1

Production
- Producers: Shobha Kapoor; Ekta Kapoor
- Production locations: Mumbai, Maharashtra
- Editor: Vikas Sharma
- Camera setup: Multi-camera
- Running time: 45 min.
- Production company: Balaji Telefilms

Original release
- Network: Sony TV
- Release: 11 March 2004 – 2005

Kkehna Hai Kuch Mujhko (transl. I Have to Say Something) is a TV series by Balaji Telefilms, broadcast on Sony TV, from 11 March 2004 to 2005. The serial showed Pallavi Joshi as Reva Kapoor, and her journey from a dutiful wife and mother to a working woman.

Swapna Waghmare Joshi was the director of the serial and script was by Mushtaq Shaikh.

== Plot ==
Reva, who used to be documentary filmmaker before marriage, has dedicated her life to being a devoted mother and a dutiful wife. Despite this, she has deferred her personal ambitions to manage her demanding children and a controlling husband.

She decides to re-enter the workforce and rediscover her identity as an individual. Reva has a supportive mother-in-law, and a friend, Ishan, who both assist her in this journey.

However, issues with her children and her husband's extra-marital affair complicate matters and create challenges.

== Cast ==
- Pallavi Joshi as Reva Kapoor
- Kiran Karmarkar as Nishchay Kapoor
- Surekha Sikri as Nishchay's mother
- Vivan Bhatena
- Ronit Roy as Ishan Masand
- Preeti Puri

== Production ==
=== Casting ===
Pallavi Joshi was cast to play Reva Kapoor. Kkehna Hai Kuch Mujhko was her return to working in Indian television drama. In an interview with TVF Guide India, regarding her role, she had said:

“The show is essentially about the crisis this middle aged woman goes through. After marriage, the children become her priority. Her association with her husband loosens. Then the children grow up and are on their own and by then the husband is busy with his own life. The woman is left all alone. That’s when she realises she needs to do something,’’ explains Pallavi.

Ronit Roy was cast to play Ishaan Masand. In the same interview, regarding his role, Joshi had said:

“In the show he is like Ekta Kapoor and he asks me to direct a serial for him. They are old buddies. She has to convince her husband that she wants to rediscover herself but that her family is her first priority and will always be,’’ Pallavi adds.
