= Biker's Adda =

Marathi film

Biker’s Adda
- Directed by: Rajesh Latkar
- Produced by: Veejay Haria; Pramod Lokhande
- Starring: Santosh Juvekar; Prarthana Behere
- Cinematography: Shakeel A. Khan
- Edited by: Mansoor Azmi
- Music by: Vishy Neemo
- Release date: 9 October 2015
- Country: India
- Language: Marathi

Biker's Adda is an Indian Marathi language film directed by Rajesh Latkar. The film starring Santosh Juvekar and Prarthana Behere. Music by Vishy Neemo. The film was released on 9 October 2015.

== Synopsis ==
Four youngsters start a biking club in order to fuel their passion and enthusiasm for bike racing. Their lives, however, change when the club slowly transforms into a drug haven.

== Cast ==
- Santosh Juvekar as Vicky
- Jai Aditya Giri as Krish
- Prarthana Behere as Aditi
- Shrikant Moghe
- Hrishikesh Mandke
- Shrikant Wattamwar
- Rahulraj Dongare
- Nikhil Rajeshirke
- Devendra Bhagat
- Anirudh Hariip
- Tanvie Kishore
- Sumit Surve
- Dharmesh Yelande as special appearance in song "Lecture Gyan"

== Soundtrack ==
Biker’s Adda

Soundtrack album by Vishy Neemo
- Released: 2015
- Recorded: 2015
- Genre: Feature film soundtrack
- Length: 15:35
- Language: Marathi

Official audio
- Biker’s Adda – Full Album on YouTube

Track listing
No.	Title	Singer(s)	Length
1.	"Ala Re Ala"	Jasraj Jayant Joshi	3:55
2.	"Tune To Love"	Sidhant Bhosale, Shonaa Gonsalves	3:31
3.	"Rimzim Rimzim"	Priyanka Barve	4:24
4.	"Wallah Wallah"	Shreyas Dharmadhikari, Shalmali Kholgade	4:39
5.	"Lecture Gyan"	Jasraj Jayant Joshi	3:38
Total length:			19:27

== Critical response ==
Biker's Adda film received mixed reviews from critics. Mihir Bhanage of The Times of India gave the film 2 stars out of 5 and wrote "Biker’s Adda might be a genuine and dedicated experiment but a confused execution halts its progress. More action and much less drama would’ve done wonders for the film". Soumitra Pote of Maharashtra Times wrote "The only positive thing about this movie is that the stunts are really thrilling. But only stunts. The rest has nothing to do with anything".
