= Aga Aga Sunbai Kay Mhanta Sasubai? =

2022 Indian Marathi-language comedy series

- Genre: Comedy; Drama
- Starring: See below
- Country of origin: India
- Original language: Marathi
- No. of episodes: 98

Production
- Producer: Manjiri Bhave
- Production locations: Mumbai, Maharashtra, India
- Camera setup: Multi-camera
- Running time: 22 minutes
- Production company: Kanha's Magic

Original release
- Network: Zee Marathi
- Release: 21 December 2022 – 27 May 2023

Aga Aga Sunbai Kay Mhanta Sasubai? (transl. Hey Daughter-in-law, What do you say Mother-in-law?) is an Indian Marathi language comedy series which aired on Zee Marathi. It starred Sukanya Kulkarni and Swanandi Tikekar in lead roles. It is produced by Manjiri Bhave under the banner of Kanha's Magic. The show premiered from 21 December 2022 and ended on 27 May 2023.

== Plot ==
A sarcastic and humorous portrayal of the love-hate relationship between Sarita, a dominating mother-in-law and Ankita, her boisterous daughter-in-law.

=== Special episode (1 hour) ===
- 29 January 2023
- 19 February 2023

== Cast ==
- Sukanya Kulkarni as Sarita Madhav Mantri
- Swanandi Tikekar as Ankita Shantanu Mantri
- Sanchit Chaudhari as Shantanu Madhav Mantri (Pilu)
- Milind Phatak as Madhav Mantri
- Ronak Shinde as Raunak Madhav Mantri
- Mrudula Kulkarni as Madhushree
- Rama Nadgauda as Sulu Aaji
