= Fugay =

- Directed by: Swapna Waghmare Joshi
- Screenplay by: Hemant Dhome; Abhijeet Guru
- Story by: Swwapnil Joshi; Subodh Bhave
- Produced by: Inderraj Kapoor (STV Networks); Arjun Singgh Baran & Kartk D Nishandar
- Starring: Swwapnil Joshi; Subodh Bhave; Prarthana Behere; Neetha Shetty
- Cinematography: Prasad Bhende
- Music by: Rochak Kohli; Amitraj Sawant; Nilesh Moharir
- Distributed by: STV Network
- Release date: 10 February 2017
- Running time: 122 min
- Country: India
- Language: Marathi
- Box office: est. ₹5.80 crore

Fugay (English: Balloons) is a 2017 Marathi-language film. It is directed by Swapna Waghmare Joshi and stars Swwapnil Joshi and Subodh Bhave in lead roles.

== Synopsis ==
Fugay is a story of two best friends played by Swwapnil Joshi and Subodh Bhave.

== Cast ==
- Swapnil Joshi as Aditya/Adya
- Subodh Bhave as Hrishikesh/Hrushya
- Prarthana Behere as Jaai
- Neetha Shetty as Kamini
- Mohan Joshi
- Anand Ingle as Daji
- Suhas Joshi
- Nishikant Kamat as Bairappa

== Release ==
Fugay had its theatrical release on 10 February 2017 with English subtitles in Maharashtra, Gujarat, Goa, Madhya Pradesh and Karnataka.

== Box office ==
The film collected ₹0.87 crore (US$91,000) on the first Friday,₹1.12 crore (US$120,000) on the first Saturday, ₹1.32 crore (US$140,000) on the first Sunday and ₹3.96 crore (US$410,000) in four days. In total, the film grossed ₹5.80 crore (US$610,000).

== Soundtrack ==
Fugay

Soundtrack album by Various
- Released: 9 November 2016
- Genre: Feature film soundtrack
- Length: 15:32
- Language: Marathi
- Label: Zee Music Company

The songs for the film are composed by various artists like Amitraj, Nilesh Moharir and Rochak Kohli and lyrics written by Kshitij Patwardhan and Mandar Cholkar.

No.	Title	Lyrics	Music	Singer(s)	Length
1.	"Hey Fugay"	Mandar Cholkar	Rochak Kohli	Siddharth Mahadevan, Avdhoot Gupte	04:28
2.	"Kahi Kale Tula"	Mandar Cholkar	Nilesh Moharir	Jaanvee Prabhu-Arora, Swapnil Bandodkar	04:04
3.	"Party De"	Kshitij Patwardhan	Amitraj	Amitraj	03:48
4.	"Say You Love Me"	Mandar Cholkar	Nilesh Moharir	Avadhoot Gupte, Jaanvee Prabhu-Arora, Mugdha Karhade	03:12
Total length:					15:32
