= Ghadge & Suun =

Indian television drama

- Genre: Family drama
- Written by: Jitendra Gupta; Ashwini Shende; Abhijit Shende
- Directed by: Chandrakant Lata Gaikwad Swapnil Mahaling
- Starring: See below
- Opening theme: "Ghadge & Sunn" by Savani Ravindra
- Country of origin: India
- Original language: Marathi
- No. of episodes: 774

Production
- Producers: Jitendra Gupta; Mahesh Tagde
- Camera setup: Multi-camera
- Running time: 22 minutes
- Production company: Tell A Tale Media

Original release
- Network: Colors Marathi
- Release: 14 August 2017 – 28 December 2019

Ghadge & Suun (transl. Ghadge & daughter-in-law) is an Indian Marathi language television series which aired on Colors Marathi. It starred Bhagyashree Limaye, Chinmay Udgirkar and Sukanya Kulkarni in lead roles.

== Plot ==
Amruta is married into the traditional Ghadge family, the most renowned jewellers (Ghadge & Sons) in Thane. Amruta, a cheerful girl of contemporary thoughts is keen to make her career in gemmology and believes that men and women are equals. Sadhana (Mai) Ghadge, the matriarch of the Ghadge family, is admired as well as feared by the family members. Mai is a stickler for discipline and believes in women essaying their roles in the kitchen and home. It explores Amruta's relationship with Mai and her efforts to win the hearts of all the Ghadges.

== Cast ==
=== Main ===
- Bhagyashree Limaye as Amruta Akshay Ghadge (nee Prabhune): Akshay's wife, Mai's youngest granddaughter-in-law, Devdatta and Mrudula's daughter-in-law.
- Chinmay Udgirkar as Akshay Ghadge: Amruta's husband, Devdatta and Mrudula's son, Kiara's ex-boyfriend.
- Sukanya Kulkarni as Sadhana Ghadge (Mai): Akshay, Anant and Sharmishtha's paternal grandmother.

=== Recurring ===
- Richa Agnihotri / Pratiksha Mungekar as Kiara Sawant: Akshay's girlfriend
- Atisha Naik as Vasudha Dinkar Ghadge: Akshay's paternal aunt; Mai's eldest daughter-in-law; Anant and Sharmishtha's mother; Bhagyashri's mother-in-law.
- Uday Salvi as Dinkar Ghadge: Vasudha's husband; Anant and Sharmishtha's father; Bhagyashri's father-in-law; Akshay's paternal uncle; Purushottam and Sadhana's elder son.
- Sandip Gaikwad as Anant Ghadge: Vasudha and Dinkar's son; Sharmishtha's real brother; Bhagyashri's widower; Chitra's husband; Akshay's cousin.
- Sonal Pawar as Chitra Ghadge: Anant's second wife, Vasudha and Dinkar's second daughter-in-law.
- Uday Sabnis as Manohar Prabhune: Amruta's greedy uncle.
- Mahesh Joshi as Devdatta Ghadge: Akshay's father; Purushottam and Sadhna's younger son; Mrudula's husband.
- Manjusha Godse / Prajakta Kelkar as Mrudula Ghadge: Akshay's mother; Devdatta's wife; Mai's younger daughter-in-law.
- Swati Limaye as Bhagyashri Ghadge: Anant's wife, Vasudha and Dinkar's daughter-in-law.
- Mayuri Kapadane as Sharmishtha Ghadge: Anant's sister; Dinkar and Vasudha's daughter; Akshay's cousin.
- Prafulla Samant as Purushottam Ghadge (Anna): Sadhana's husband, Devdatta and Dinkar's father, Akshay, Anant, Sharmishtha's grandfather.
- Usha Nadkarni as Aau: Purushottam's mother; Sadhna's mother-in-law, Devdatta and Dinkar's grandmother; Akshay, Anant and Sharmishtha's great grandmother.

=== Guest appearance ===
- Rishi Saxena as Rishi, Amruta's old friend.
- Harshada Khanvilkar as Inspector Saudamini.

== Production ==
=== Casting ===
Bhagyashree Limaye was selected to play the role of Amruta, making her acting debut. Chinmay Udgirkar was selected to play the role of Akshay. Richa Agnihotri was initially roped for the role of Kiara, but was replaced by Pratiksha Mungekar. Rishi Saxena also play the role of Amruta's friend. Harshada Khanvilkar roped for the role of Saudamini, a police officer. Usha Nadkarni also selected to play the role of Aau. Sonal Pawar was selected to play the role of Chitra.

=== Airing history ===
No.	Airing Date	Days	Time (IST)
1	14 August 2017 – 7 September 2019	Mon-Sat (sometimes Sun)	8:30 pm
2	9 September – 14 December 2019	Mon-Sat (sometimes Sun)	7 pm
3	16 – 28 December 2019	Mon-Sat (sometimes Sun)	6 pm

== Adaptations ==
Language	Title	Original release	Network(s)	Last aired	Notes
Marathi	Ghadge & Suun घाडगे & सून	14 August 2017	Colors Marathi	28 December 2019	Original
Bengali	Dutta & Bouma দত্ত & বউমা	30 August 2021	Colors Bangla	23 January 2022	Remake
Gujarati	Moti Baa Ni Nani Vahu મોટી બા ની નાની વહુ	15 November 2021	Colors Gujarati	Ongoing	Remake
