= Mr. & Mrs. Sadachari =

- Theatrical release poster
- Directed by: Ashish Wagh
- Written by: Pravin Tarde; Uma Kulkarni
- Produced by: Utpal Acharya; Ashish Wagh
- Starring: Vaibbhav Tatwawdi; Prarthana Behere
- Cinematography: Balajee Rangha
- Edited by: Mayur Hardas
- Music by: Pankaj Padghan; V. Harikrishna
- Production company: Indian Films Studio
- Distributed by: Indian Films Studio
- Release date: 19 February 2016
- Country: India
- Language: Marathi

Mr. & Mrs. Sadachari is a 2016 Indian Marathi language action romance film, directed by Ashish Wagh and produced by Utpal Acharya and Ashish Wagh under the banner Indian Films Studio. The film released on 19 February 2016 across Maharashtra. It stars Vaibbhav Tatwawdi and Prarthana Behere in lead roles. The hit pair is brought together again after Coffee Ani Barach Kahi. The movie is an official remake of the Kannada film Mr & Mrs Ramachari.

== Plot ==
The Sadachari family is a middle-class Maharashtrian family, with a mother, father, and two sons. Jiva is the tame, docile one, who is a straight-A student, while Shiva (Vaibbhav Tatwawdi) is a hot-headed, street-smart altruistic boy, who idolizes Shivaji Maharaj. Shiva's father (Mohan Joshi) has given up on him, and the father-son have a strained relationship. Shiva avoids his father, college, and responsibilities, among other things. Shiva falls in love with Gargi (Prarthana Behere), who happens to be his best friend Dattu's sister. Dattu doesn't agree with this at first, but being a side-character, he doesn't have much of a choice but to give in. After a few saccharine-sweet romantic days, Gargi and Shiva have a huge fight, in which Gargi (sort of) walks out on Shiva. In fits of rage, they both agree to marry different people, who are brought into their lives by their respective parents. A few twists and turns later. Are they able to reconcile their differences and come back together? forms the crux of story.

== Cast ==
- Vaibbhav Tatwawdi as Shiva Sadachari
- Prarthana Behere as Gargi
- Mohan Joshi as Shiva's father
- Vijay Andalkar
- Uma Sardeshmukh as Shiva's mother
- Uday Nene as Bandya
- Sumukhi Pendse as Gargi's mother
- Prasad Jawade as Datt
- Shalva Kinjawdekar as Young Shiva

== Soundtrack ==
No.	Title	Lyrics	Music	Singer(s)	Length
1.	"Jagdamb"		Pankaj Padghan	Adarsh Shinde, Sayali, Chorus
2.	"Saang Na Re"		Pankaj Padghan	Tushar Joshi, Sayalie Pankaj
3.	"Prem Rutu" (based on "Upavasa" from Mr. and Mrs. Ramachari)		V. Harikrishna	Sagar Phadake
4.	"Mr. & Mrs. Sadachari" (based on the title track from Mr. and Mrs. Ramachari)	Omkar Mangesh Datt	V. Harikrishna	Rohit Raut
