= Sun Zarra =

- Directed by: Rohit Nayyar
- Based on: Sathi (1999)
- Produced by: Salim
- Starring: Samir Aftab; Anjana; Kishori Shahane; Mithun Chakraborty
- Music by: Anu Malik
- Release date: 24 February 2006
- Running time: 125 minutes
- Country: India
- Language: Hindi

Sun Zarra is a 2006 Hindi-language Indian film directed by Rohit Nayyar, starring Samir Aftab, Anjana, Kishori Shahane and Mithun Chakraborty in an extended special appearance. The film is an unofficial remake of Jeet's blockbuster Bengali film Sathi (2002).

== Cast ==
- Samir Aftab as Rohit
- Anjana as Trisha
- Kishori Shahane
- Mithun Chakraborty as Bihari Babu Gauri Shankar
- Renuka Shahane
- Arjun as Landlord

== Soundtrack ==
"Dil Ki Sun Zarra"
