= Love Factor: Premachi Trilogy =

Love Factor (Premachi Trilogy)
- Directed by: Kishor Vibhandik
- Story by: Kishor Vibhandik
- Produced by: Mukund Satav
- Starring: Rajesh Shringarpure, Khushboo Tawde, Kushal Badrike, Harshada Bhawsar.
- Cinematography: Mayuresh Joshi
- Music by: Chinar-Mahesh
- Release date: 14 December 2014
- Country: India
- Language: Marathi

Love Factor is a 2014 Marathi romantic feature film written and directed by Kishor Vibhandik and produced by Mukund Satav. It stars Rajesh Shringarpure, Khushboo Tawde, and Kushal Badrike.

== Cast ==
- Rajesh Shringarpure
- Khushboo Tawde
- Kushal Badrike
- Harshada Bhawsar

== Soundtrack ==
Love Factor

Soundtrack album by Chinar - Mahesh
- Genre: Feature film soundtrack
- Language: Marathi

No.	Title	Lyrics	Singer(s)	Length
1.	"Teri Yad Sataye"	Mangesh Kangne	Chinar - Mahesh	05:11
2.	"Nakalat Datli Hirwal"	Mangesh Kangne	Anusha Dandekar	04:52
3.	"Dil Bole"	Mangesh Kangne	Chinar - Mahesh	04:30
4.	"Tere lafde Main"	Mangesh Kangne	Chinar - Mahesh	04:50
Total length:				18:43
