= Chinmay Udgirkar =

Indian actor

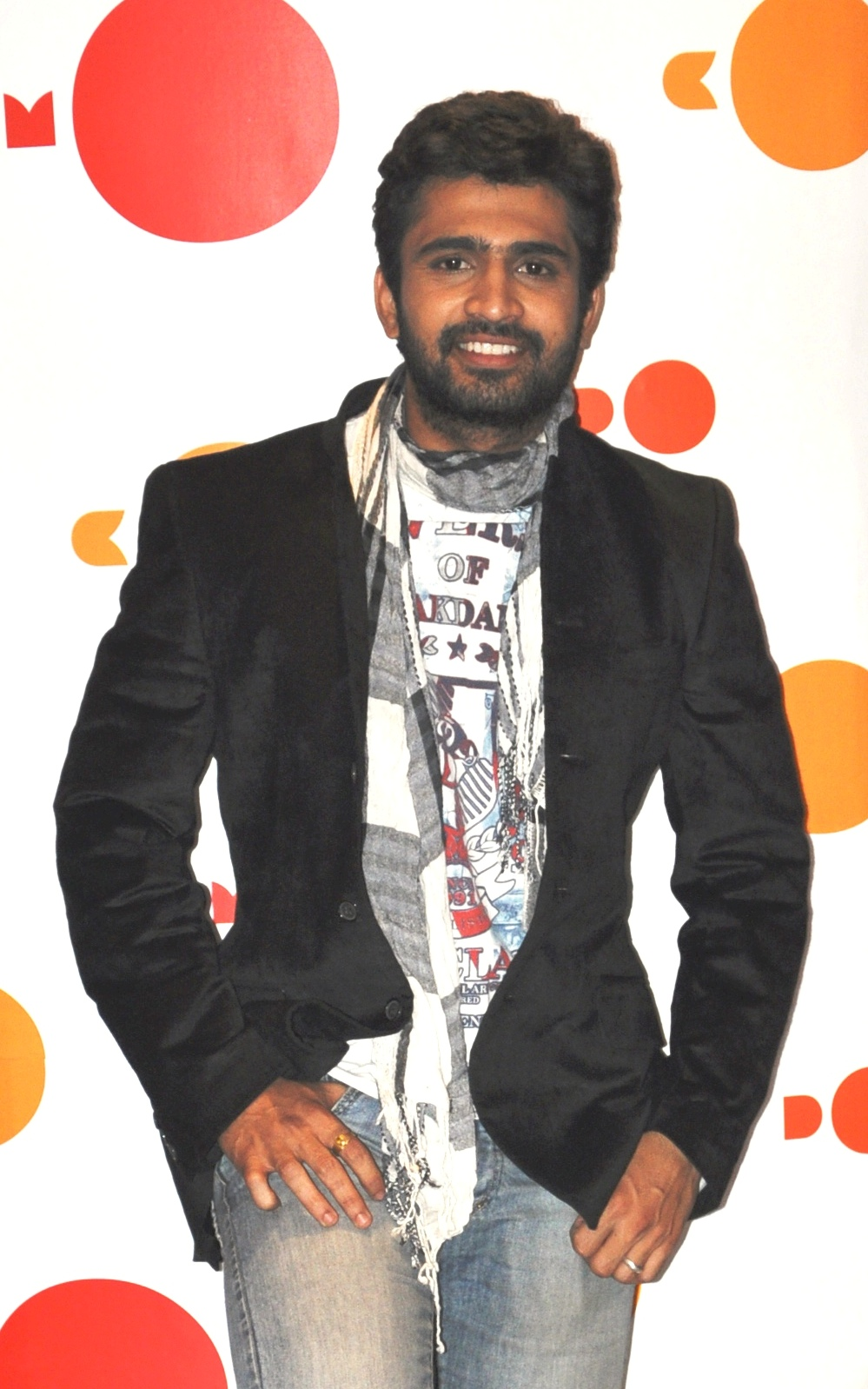
- Udgirkar at premiere of Shyamche Vadil
- Occupation: Actor
- Years active: 2009–present
- Known for: Swapnanchya Palikadle; Ghadge & Suun
- Spouse: Girija Joshi (m. 2015)

Chinmay Udgirkar is an Indian film and television actor. He debuted with a reality show called Maharashtracha Superstar in 2009–2010. He was ranked twenty-fifth in The Times of India's Top 30 Most Desirable Men of Maharashtra in 2019.

== Early life and career ==
Chinmay made his debut on television from the television show Maharashtracha Superstar on Zee Marathi in 2009. Then, he got role in the Marathi serial Swapnanchya Palikadle on Star Pravah in 2010. He played a character of Shreyas Patkar in that serial.

Chinmay also hosted the reality show called Maharashtracha Dancing Superstar Chote Masters (2013). He also played a role in another serial named Nanda Saukhya Bhare (2016) on Zee Marathi.

He made his debut in Marathi film industry with movie Shyamche Vadil in 2012. He played a leading character of Shyam in this movie. He also acted in another film which name was Vaajlaach Pahije. He also performed in the theatre. He acted for few plays like Rim Jhim Rim Jhim, Elkunchwar etc. He acted in Colors Marathi's Ghadge & Suun (2017). He played a lead character of Akshay Ghadge. He was also seen in the lead role of Premwari.

== Personal life ==
He married his co-actor of Vaajlaach Pahije Girija Joshi on 27 November 2015.

== Filmography ==
=== Feature films ===
All movies are in Marathi, unless mentioned.

Year	Film	Role	Ref.
2012	Shyamche Vadil	Shyam	
2015	Vaajlaach Paahije: Game Ki Shinema	Raj	
2018	Gulabjaam	Amey	
2019	Premwaari	Rahul	
2020	Makeup	Neil	
2020	Vajvuya Band Baja	Chinmay	
2023	Urmi	Vishwas	
2023	Ankush	Bhosale Bhai	
2024	Alyad Palyad	Sarkar	
2024	Raghu 350	Shantanu	
2025	Jay Bhim Panther	Siddharth	

=== Television ===
Year	Title	Character	Medium	Ref.
2009-2010	Maharashtracha Superstar	Contestant	Reality show on Zee Marathi	
2011-2014	Swapnanchya Palikadle	Shreyas Patkar	Serial on Star Pravah	
2013	Maharashtracha Dancing Superstar - Chhote Masters	Host	Reality show on Star Pravah	
2015-2016	Nanda Saukhya Bhare	Indranil Jahagirdar	Serial on Television Zee Marathi	
2016	Krantijyoti Savitribai Phule	Jyotirao Phule	DD National	
2017-2019	Ghadge & Suun	Akshay Ghadge	Serial on Colors Marathi	
2021	Sakkhe Shejari	Host	Non-fiction show on Colors Marathi	
2021	Aggabai Sunbai	Anurag Gokhale	Serial on Zee Marathi	

=== Stage ===
Year	Play	Language	Ref.
2014	Rim Jhim Rim Jhim	Marathi	
