= Salaam (2014 film) =

- Directed by: Kiran Yadnyopavit
- Produced by: Gaurav Somani
- Starring: Girish Kulkarni; Kishor Kadam; Atisha Naik
- Music by: Narendra Bhide
- Release date: 2 May 2014
- Country: India
- Language: Marathi

Salaam is an Indian Marathi language film directed and writer by Kiran Yadnyopavit and produced by Calyx Media and Entertainment. The film starring Girish Kulkarni, Kishor Kadam and Atisha Naik and Music by Rahul Ranade. The film was released on 2 May 2014.

== Synopsis ==
Raghunath, the son of a policeman, and Shankar, the son of an army officer, are best friends. However, both of them believe that their father's profession is more prestigious than the other.

== Cast ==
- Girish Kulkarni as Shankar
- Kishor Kadam as School Principal
- Atisha Naik
- Sanjay Khapre as Parshuram
- Vivek Chabukswar as Raghu
- Abhishek Bharate as Sada
- Jyoti

== Soundtrack ==
Salaam

Soundtrack album by Narendra Bhide
- Released: 2014
- Recorded: 2014
- Genre: Feature film soundtrack
- Length: 4:16
- Language: Marathi

Official audio
- Salaam – Full Album on YouTube

Track listing
No.	Title	lyrics(s)	Length
1.	"Tya Drushtila Salam"	Vaibhav Joshi	4:16
Total length:			4:16

== Critical response ==
Salaam received positive reviews from critics. A reviewer from Loksatta wrote " Overall the amazing music of the movie, all the leading artistes and leading child actors have impressed the audience with their performances". Shripad Brahme of Maharashtra Times rated the film 3.5 out of 5 stars and wrote "Do watch 'Salaam' to throw off the masks of artificial life and see the pure, spring-like face inside you and salute the director for this discovery". A reviewer from The Times of India rated the film 3 out of 5 stars and wrote "But where 'Salaam' stands out is in its beautiful portrayal of the good old childhood days. Watch this one to revive those".
