= Surajya =

- Directed by: Santosh Manjrekar
- Screenplay by: Saurabh Bhave
- Story by: Vinayak Prabhu
- Produced by: Vector Projects India Pvt. Ltd.; Umesh Rao; Siya Manjrekar Productions
- Starring: Vaibbhav Tatwawdi; Mrunal Thakur; Sharad Ponkshe; Madhav Abhyankar; Dr. Sriram Patki; Vinayak Bhave
- Cinematography: Vikramkumar Amladi
- Music by: Pankaj Padgham
- Distributed by: Prabhat Enterprises
- Release date: 18 April 2014
- Running time: 1 hr 54 Min
- Country: India
- Language: Marathi

Surajya is a 2014 Indian Marathi language movie. The movie marks the debut of Vaibbhav Tatwawdi and is directed by award-winning Director of Mi Shivaji Raje Bhosale Boltoi fame Santosh Manjrekar. Music and Background score is given by Pankaj Padgham and Cinematography is by Vikramkumar Amladi. Vector Projects mark their entry into the Movie Industry with this movie.

Times of India praised the performances of the actors and commented that the film is "definitely a one-time watch".

== Plot ==
When a young interior designer goes to his native place, the absence of a hospital there shocks him. He them embarks on a quest to get basic medical facilities to his village.

The residents of Mashem in Goa are god-fearing people who are afraid to go against the word of a Godman in the village. Such is the fear in them that they fail to speak up even when they witness money being collected in the name of God and being stacked in the hermitage locker.

Having been posted in Goa, Omkar (Vaibbhav Tatwawdi) decides to spend a week with his parents at his village. His father Ramdas (Sharad Ponkshe) who is the local priest, asks Omkar to go around and collect money from the residents for the renovation of the hermitage. While doing this, Omkar comes across an old lady lying on her deathbed who cannot afford treatment because the nearest hospital is an hour away. By the time Omkar and his friend Bandya (Shriram Patki) get her to the hospital, she dies, and this jolts Omkar. He, along with his love interest Dr Swapna Bhosale (Mrunal Thakur) and Bandya tries to get funds from the hermitage for constructing a hospital but to no effect. That is when they take an oath to fight for the welfare of the people, by hook or by crook.

== Cast ==
- Vaibbhav Tatwawdi as Omkar Prabhu
- Mrunal Thakur as Dr. Swapna Bhosale
- Dr. Sriram Patki as Bandya
- Sharad Ponkshe as Ramdas Prabhu
- Madhav Abhyankar as Swamy Sudarshan Maharaj
- Pournima Manohar as Omkar's Mother
- Vinayak Bhave as Manohar Swamy

== Soundtrack ==
No.	Title	Singer(s)	Music
1	"Ha Nava Bahana"	Rohit Raut	Pankaj Padgham
2	"Mor Pisa"	Sayali Pankaj & Mangesh Borgaonkar	Pankaj Padgham
3	"Surajya Yet Aahe"	Various	Pankaj Padgham
