= Vakratunda Mahakaaya =

- Film poster
- Directed by: Punarvasu Naik
- Written by: Yogesh Vinayak Joshi
- Produced by: Bohra Bros; Anurag Kashyap; Guneet Monga; Anshuman Jain
- Starring: Vijay Maurya; Naman Jain; Shashank Shende; Prarthana Behere; Rishi Deshpande; Jayant Sawarkar; Usha Nadkarni
- Cinematography: Mitesh Mirchandani
- Edited by: Ashish Mhatre; Apurva Motiwale
- Music by: Sanket Naik; Sankarshan Kini
- Distributed by: Relativity B4U
- Release date: 25 September 2015
- Country: India
- Language: Marathi

Vakratunda Mahakaaya is a 2015 Indian Marathi-language film about an attempted terrorist attack in Mumbai during the festival of Ganesh Chaturthi. It is a comedy thriller, directed by Punarvasu Naik and produced by Bohra Bros, Anurag Kashyap, Guneet Monga and Anshuman Jain.

The film features an ensemble cast of Vijay Maurya, Naman Jain, Shashank Shende, Prarthana Behere, Rishi Deshpande, Jayant Sawarkar & Usha Nadkarni.

== Plot ==
A bomb has been planted in a Ganesha soft toy by an unknown terrorist organization. The plan goes haywire when Altaf, a street kid, accidentally picks it up and runs away with it. Altaf develops a bond with the likeness of the elephant headed God, but soon he is whisked away by the cops along with his thief friend, Paplu. Ganesha is left behind alone on a park bench, though only for a short while. He sets off on a journey with people from different paths of life. They all treat him like god, but use him to fulfil their desires at the same time, oblivious to the fact that there is a ticking bomb inside. Ganesha, the omniscient observer continues his journey to salvation.
