= Satish Motling =

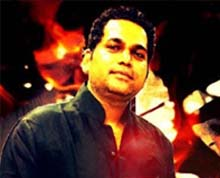

Satish Motling is an Indian film director born on 29 October 1982 who has directed Marathi films such as Agadbam and Matter. His movie Priyatama was released on 14 February 2014. Next upcoming release is 35% kathawar pass & Mile jab chora chori. He is also known for international adfilms.

== Filmography ==
Year	Film	Role	Notes
2008	Tujhya Majhya Sansarala Ani Kay hav	Director	Released - 2008
2010	Agadbam	Director	Released - 8 October 2010
2012	Matter	Director	Released - 2 March 2012
2014	Priyatama	Director	Released - 14 February 2014
2015	Powder	Director	Upcoming Marathi Movie
