= Vaajlaach Paahije: Game Ki Shinema =

- Film poster
- Directed by: R.Viraj
- Written by: Parag Kulkarni
- Produced by: Channel U Entertainment
- Starring: Bhalchandra Kadam; Chinmay Udgirkar; Girija Joshi; Rajesh Bhosale
- Cinematography: Ankush Birajdar
- Edited by: Nilesh Gavand
- Music by: Praful Kalrekar
- Release date: 11 September 2015
- Country: India
- Language: Marathi

Vaajlaach Paahije - Game Ki Shinema (English: The show must go on) is a 2015 Marathi comedy-drama film directed by R.Viraj and produced by Channel U Entertainment. The film features an ensemble cast of Bhalchandra Kadam, Aarti Solanki, Chinmay Udgirkar, Girija Joshi, Rajesh Bhosale.

The film is a tribute to Dada Kondke, a Marathi actor and film Producer, who was known for his double entendre dialogues in the movie. The film was released on 11 September 2015.

== Cast ==
- Bhalchandra Kadam as Bhau Kamdar
- Aarti Solanki as Zatak Chandni
- Chinmay Udgirkar as Raj, struggling actor
- Girija Joshi as Supriya, Yash's sister
- Rajesh Bhosale as Makarand Thokare, alias Yash

== Plot ==
The film revolves around a struggling director, Yash, (Rajesh Bhosale_ and a struggling actor, Raj, Chinmay Udgirkar who try to cross all the hurdles to make a film and make it a big success for themselves. The two goons start their search for a Producer for their film. During the strive to make a film they come across a filthy Producer named Bhau Damdar, Bhalchandra Kadam who agrees to finance only on the condition of getting a beautiful heroine for the film.

Yash describes an unseen girl in such a way that Bhau is enthused and agrees to produce their film. He immediately springs them with advance and asks them to immediately get the heroine to him.

Yash and Raj's hunt for a producer ends here, but the next hunt for the imaginary actress starts here. And their hunt ends at the Kolhapur Film City, where Raj accidentally meets his fake love, Supriya (Girija Joshi). Raj instantly informs Yash about the success of finding the girl. But Yash who stayed back with Bhau to discuss the script is upset as Bhau has finalized a horrendous script called Nal Damayanti- The Intimate Love Story!

Next day, everyone is excited to meet the heroine, particularly Bhau who has been day dreaming of his Damayanti. The plot takes a turn when Raj gets Supriya to Bhau's place...

Bhau with his sinister intentions and desires signs Supriya instantly and hands her a bag full of cash as her signing and another bag of cash to Yash to start the film but the film takes a turn by how they intend to make a genuine film with the allocated funds by deceiving Bhau, is the ultimate crux of the story.

Hereafter begins a hilarious plot of rescuing Supriya from Bhau's clutches and shooting a film of his choice using Bhau's money. Will they succeed in their mission? Raj and Supriya really fall in love? What efforts they take to save Supriya from Bhau and how successfully they complete their film - Producer Jomaat Director Comaat!
