= Girija Joshi =

Indian actress

- Born: Roha, Raigad, Maharashtra, India
- Occupation: Actress
- Years active: 2013–present
- Spouse: Chinmay Udgirkar (m. 2015)

Girija Joshi is an Indian actress who appears in Marathi movies. She made her debut with Govinda in 2013 opposite Swapnil Joshi.

== Personal life ==
Girija was born in Raigad district, Maharashtra. She completed her primary education in K.E.S English Medium School, Roha, Raigad then she moved to Vashi, Navi Mumbai. She has a completed an acting course through St. Joseph's Academy, Dehradun. In 2015, She is married to Chinmay Udgirkar.

== Career ==
Girija started her career in Marathi film Govinda opposite Swapnil Joshi. She will be the co-star of Siddharth Jadhav in Powder movie and Priyatama . In 2014 she appeared in 'Dhamak' opposite Aniket Vishwasrao.

== Filmography ==
Year	Title	Role	Ref.
2013	Govinda	Shravani	
2014	Powder	Pooja	
2014	Priyatama	Gauree	
2014	Dhamak	Gauri	
2015	Deool Band	Radha Shastri	
2015	Vaajlaach Paahije: Game Ki Shinema	Supriya	
2016	Jalsa	Karuna	
2016	Toh Ani Me: Ek Runanubandh	Nidhi Nayak	
2020	Bhaybheet	Special appearance	
