= Vaibhav Tatwawadi =

Indian film actor (born 1988)

Vaibhav Tatwawaadi
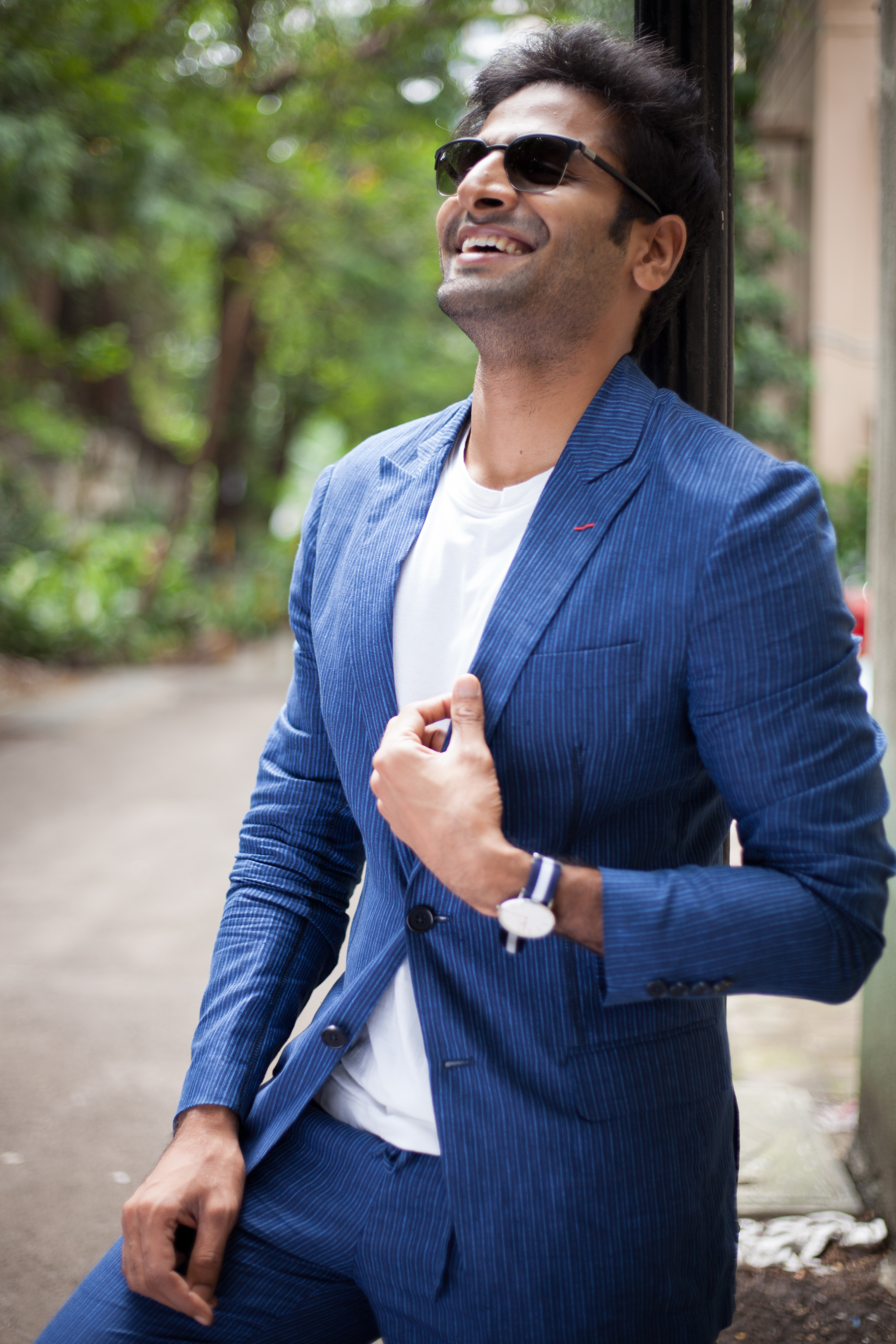
- Born: 25 September 1988 (age 38); Amravati, Maharashtra, India
- Occupation: Actor
- Years active: 2010–present

Vaibhav Tatwawadi (Marathi: वैभव तत्ववादी; born 25 September 1988) is an Indian actor who appears mainly in Marathi films and has also worked in Hindi films.

== Early life ==
Vaibhav was born in Amravati, Maharashtra, to Sheela and Dr. Vivek Tatwawadi. His mother is a home maker and his father heads a local Engineering College. He has a younger brother Gaurav Tatwawadi, who has done his MBA from MDI- Gurgaon. Vaibhav completed his schooling at Somalwar High School, Nagpur before moving to Pune in 2006 to pursue a degree in Metallurgical engineering at College of Engineering, Pune. He started experimenting with theatre while still at school and pursued it actively through his undergraduate years. His versatility and natural flair for acting brought him tremendous success and recognition in the local theatre circuit. He completed his education in 2010 and moved to Mumbai in 2011, to pursue a career in films.

== Career ==
Tatwawadi started his career from couple of prestigious contests of Pune as theatre actor. Officially, he started his career with television and made his Marathi film debut in 2014 with Santosh Manjrekar's Surajya. The film did moderate business at the box office but Tatwawadi mature portrayal of a sensitive, young professional fighting for a social cause garnered critical acclaim. His first release in 2015 was the romantic feature Coffee Ani Barach Kahi alongside Prarthana Behere. The film emerged as a commercial and critical success and Tatwawadi's performance was widely appreciated.

His second release in 2015 was the Hindi adult comedy film Hunterrr which also marked his Bollywood debut. Tatwawadi essayed a powerful supporting role which earned him mention in Filmfare magazine. He closed the year with another strong supporting performance as Chimaji Appa, in Sanjay Leela Bhansali's Bajirao Mastani. Critics were unanimous in their praise with Rajeev Masand (CNN IBN) review and Taran Adarsh review. In 2016, Tatwawadi changed gears with his first action packed role in Mr. and Mrs. Sadachari.

== Media image ==
Most Desirable Men of Maharashtra
Sponsor	Year	Rank	
Sponsor	Year	Film	Ref.
The Times of India, Maharashtra Times	2017	1	
The Times of India, Maharashtra Times	2018	4	
The Times of India, Maharashtra Times	2019	8	
The Times of India, Maharashtra Times	2020	10	

He was ranked thirty-first in The Times of India's Top 50 Most Desirable Men of India in 2017.

== Filmography ==
=== Films ===
Key
†	Denotes films that have not yet been released

Vaibhav Tatwawadi film credits
Year	Title	Role	Language	Notes	Ref.
2011	Fakta Ladh Mhana	Son Of Madhusudan Patil	Marathi		
2013	Kurukshetra	Sagar Thorat	Marathi		
2014	Surajya	Omkar Prabhu	Marathi	Debut as lead	
2015	Hunterrr	Kshitij	Hindi		
2015	Coffee Ani Barach Kahi	Nishad	Marathi		
2015	Shortcut: Disto Pan Nasto	Rohit Pradhan	Marathi		
2015	Bajirao Mastani	Chimaji Appa	Hindi		
2016	Mr. and Mrs. Sadachari	Shiva Sadachari	Marathi		
2016	Cheater	Abhay Agnihotri	Marathi		
2016	Kanha	Malhar Bhosale	Marathi		
2016	Lipstick Under My Burkha	Manoj	Hindi		
2017	Bhetali Tu Punha	Alok Bhave	Marathi		
2018	What's Up Lagna	Aakash	Marathi		
2018	Ranangan	Himself	Marathi	Special appearance in song "Naad Karaycha Naay"	
2019	Manikarnika: The Queen of Jhansi	Puran Singh	Hindi		
2019	Readymix	Sameer	Marathi		
2019	Smile Please	Himself	Marathi	Special appearance	
2019	Indu Aur Voh Chitthi	Karan Agnihotri	Hindi	Short film	
2020	Nice To Meet You	Rajiv	Hindi	Short film	
2021	Tribhanga	Robindro Apte	Hindi		
2021	Grey	Siddhant	Marathi		
2022	Pondicherry	Rohan	Marathi		Nominated - Maharashtra State Film Award for Best Actor
2023	Circuitt	Siddharth Mohite	Marathi		
2023	Gunchakkar	Yau Salunkhe	Hindi	Short film	
2023	Teen Adkun Sitaram	Pushkar	Marathi		
2024	Article 370	Yash Chauhan	Hindi		
2024	Operation Valentine	Shaheen	Telugu	Bilingual film	
2024	Operation Valentine	Shaheen	Hindi	Bilingual film	
2024	Maharaj	Dr Bhau Daji Lad	Hindi		
2024	A Wedding Story	Vikram	Hindi		
2026	Dacoit: A Love Story	Bhaskar	Telugu	Bilingual film	
2026	Dacoit: A Love Story	Bhaskar	Hindi	Bilingual film	

=== Television ===
Vaibhav Tatwawadi television credits
Year	Title	Notes
2010	Discover Maharashtra	
2011	Amarprem	
2011	Lakshya	
2012	Pinjara	
2013	Tuza Maza Jamena	
2017	Prem He...	

=== Web series ===
Vaibhav Tatwawadi web series credits
Year	Title	Role	Language	Notes
2019	Hutatma	Comrade Abhay Sane	Marathi	
2020	Project 9191	Pankaj Dhanawade	Hindi	
2020	Forbidden Love	Dr. Harsh	Hindi	
2022	Nirmal Pathak Ki Ghar Wapsi	Nirmal Pathak	Hindi	
2023	Commando	Kshitij Mehra	Hindi	
2026	Made In India: A Titan Story	Akash Dixit	Hindi	
