= Harish Raut =

Indian artist

- Born: 7 November 1925; Bordi, Thane District, Maharashtra
- Died: 2002 (aged 76–77)
- Citizenship: Indian
- Website: http://www.harishraut.com

Harish Raut (7 November 1925 – 2002) was an Indian artist who developed a distinctive figurative style. Idealized rural women, going about their daily chores was the main subject of his work. His early work was based on the rural realities of his hometown Bordi and the neighbouring town of Bassein, Maharashtra. Rural India continued to inspire him and he found his muse once again in the women of Rajasthan, Madhya Pradesh and Kerala.

Raut graduated with a diploma in painting from the J.J School Fine Art in Mumbai in 1952. For many of his early years he worked as a clerk but continued to paint developing a strong personal signature style. In less than a decade his work was winning awards all over India.

Over the course of his long career he had 53 one man shows in Mumbai, Kolkata, Delhi, Washington, D.C., New York City, and Ottawa.
