= Priyatama (2014 film) =

- Directed by: Satish Motling
- Story by: Sachin Darekar
- Based on: Romeo and Juliet by William Shakespeare
- Produced by: Sejal Shinde
- Starring: Siddarth Jadhav; Girija Joshi
- Cinematography: Satish Motling
- Edited by: Preetam Naik
- Music by: Chaitanya Adkar
- Release date: 14 February 2014
- Running time: 116 minutes
- Country: India
- Language: Marathi

Priyatama (Marathi: प्रियतमा.... खडकाळ माळराणावर फुललेलं एक हळवं प्रीतस्वप्न) is a 2014 Marathi film. The film is the story of Parsha and Gauri in a small village of Maharashtra in 1951, who fall in love despite belonging to different social classes and opposite lifestyles.

Priyatama was released in theaters on 14 February 2014.

== Plot ==
Parsha belongs to a community in Maharashtra, known as "Potraj", who are said to be messengers of Goddess Lakshmi, and devote their entire lives to this service. This community travels around and makes temporary shelters at each village, feeding themselves on grains donated by villagers, as they are not allowed to live normal lives. Members of Potraj carry a whip, called Korda, and regularly practice mortification of the flesh, as a way to please Lakshmi.

Parsha soon meets Gauri, a sweet young village girl belonging to a very rich family. Her father is Sarpanch of that village. Initially Gauri is scared of Parsha, but soon she begins to see a different person in him and they both start developing feelings for each other. Their mutual feelings get stronger with every meeting. Soon, they realize that they cannot live without each other, and conflict arises when they face rough reactions from both ends of society.

The film draws inspiration from Shakespeare's play, Romeo and Juliet.

== Cast ==
- Siddarth Jadhav as Parsha
- Girija Joshi as Gauri
- Sagar Satpute as shiva

== Soundtrack ==
Priyatama

Soundtrack album by Chaitanya Adkar
- Released: 8 May 2014
- Genre: Feature film soundtrack
- Language: Marathi
- Label: Everest Entertainment
External audio
- Audio Jukebox on YouTube

The soundtrack of Priyatama was composed by Chaitanya Adkar while the lyrics were provided by Prakash Holkar and Abhay Inamdar.

Tracklist
No.	Title	Singer(s)	Length
1.	"Ghungarachya Taalavar"	Utkarsh Shinde, Bela Shende	03:14
2.	"Tujhya Roopacha Chandana"	Prasanjeet Kosambi & Aanandi Joshi	04:30
3.	"Laagir"	Adarsh Shinde	02:48
4.	"Udho Udho"	Anand Shinde	02:48
5.	"Daar Ughad"	Adarsh Shinde	04:00
6.	"Priyatama"		01:26
7.	"Priyatama" (Remix Version)		02:38
8.	"Laagir" (Remix Version)		02:14
9.	"Daar Ughad" (Remix Version)		02:46
