= Swapnil Joshi =

Indian television actor (born 1977)

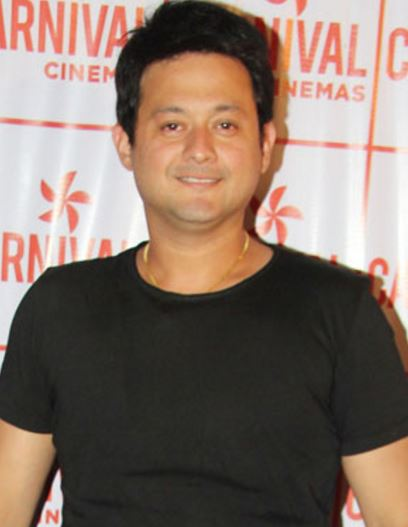
- Joshi at the trailer launch of Mumbai-Pune-Mumbai 2
- Born: 18 October 1977 (age 49); Mumbai, Maharashtra, India
- Education: Sydenham College of Commerce and Economics
- Occupation: Actor
- Years active: 1989–present
- Spouses: Aparna Joshi (m. 2005; div. 2009); Leena Aradhye (m. 2011)
- Children: 2

Swapnil Joshi (born 18 October 1977) is an Indian film and television actor, in Hindi and Marathi languages.

He has done some of the most successful series in television such as Krishna, Eka Lagnachi Dusri Goshta as well as films like Duniyadari, Mumbai-Pune-Mumbai casting him as the lead actor. He has done many comedy shows like Comedy Circus and Papad Pol – Shahabuddin Rathod Ki Rangeen Duniya in Hindi industry. Swapnil owns a wrestling team named 'Vidarbhache Wagh' in Zee Maharashtra Kusti Dangal. He was ranked twelfth in The Times of India's Top 20 Most Desirable Men of Maharashtra in 2017.

== Early life ==
Joshi was born on 18 October 1977 in Girgaon, Mumbai. He attended the Byramjee Jeejeebhoy Parsee Charitable Institution, and later, he pursued a Bachelor of Commerce degree from Sydenham College of Commerce and Economics. While his parents worked in government services, Joshi, on the other hand, is known for his career as an actor. He is the only son of his parents.

== Career ==
=== Debut and breakthrough (1989–2010) ===
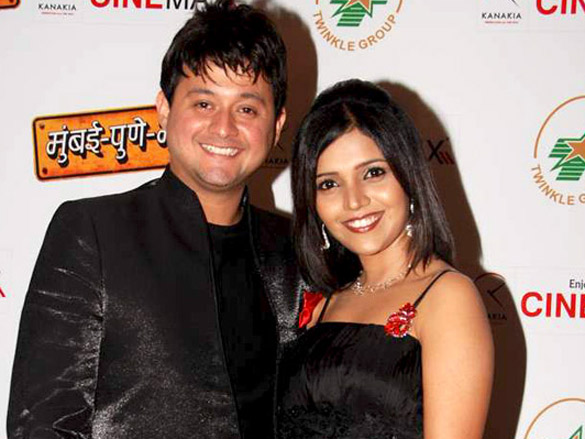
Joshi with costar Mukta Barve at premiere of Marathi film Mumbai-Pune-Mumbai

At the age of nine, Joshi started his acting career with Ramanand Sagar's show Uttar Ramayana, where he played the role of young Kusha. In 1993, he was offered the role of young Krishna in another Ramanand Sagar's show named Krishna. Later, Joshi took a break from acting and made a comeback as a youth actor with Sanjeev Bhattacharya's show Campus. He then continued working in Hindi shows like Hudd Kar Di, Dil Vil Pyar Vyar, Des Mein Niklla Hoga Chand, Hare Kkaanch Ki Choodiyaan to name a few. In 1997, he played the role of Inder in Zee TV's popular show Amanat. Then, he played the role of Dhruv, a parallel lead in the serial Kehta Hai Dil. In 1997, he first played the supporting role of Vikram Dixit in the film Ghulam-E-Mustafa, starring Nana Patekar and Raveena Tandon.

He also portrayed the role of Dr. Prakash in the popular show Bhabhi. He played the role of Arjun, Supriya Pilgaonkar's youngest son in the show Kadvee Khatee Meethi, which was a sequel of super-hit comedy show Tu Tu Main Main. He also hosted the kid's talent show named Chota Packet Bada Dhamaka. In 2008, he participated on Sony TV's show Mr. & Ms. TV, which was judged by Madhur Bhandarkar and Sonali Bendre. He won the show along with actress Purvi Joshi. His first Marathi film was Manini, where he played the lead role of Deepak Rajyadhakshya. In 2008, he acted in the multi-starrer film Checkmate.

He played the role of Chingya in the comedy film Amhi Satpute. He then played the lead character of Yash in the Marathi series Adhuri Ek Kahani opposite Kishori Godbole. He also acted in the comedy show Tere Gharchya Samor. He played the role of Pratap in the show Ardhangini.

=== Established actor (2010–present) ===
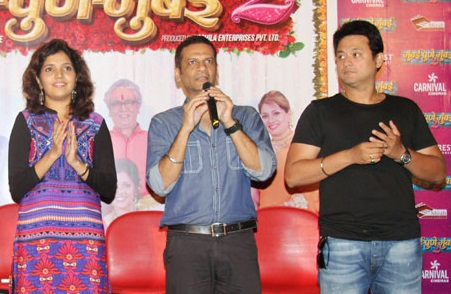
Joshi with Satish Rajwade (center) and Mukta Barve at MPM 2 trailer launch

In 2010, he played the lead role of a boy from Pune in the hit, romantic film Mumbai-Pune-Mumbai opposite Mukta Barve. His chemistry with Barve in the film was compared to that of Shah Rukh Khan and Kajol. He also played the lead role of Yash Kumar in the Hindi film The Life Zindagi in 2011.

Joshi then turned his attention towards comedy shows and participated in the first season of Comedy Circus. He was paired with V.I.P and the duo was declared as runner's up of the show. Later, he was the contestant of various seasons of Comedy Circus like Comedy Circus-Chinchpokli To China, Comedy Circus- 20-20, Comedy Circus Ke Superstars, Comedy Circus Ke Tansen and more. In the eighth season of the show named Comedy Circus- Maha Sangram, he became victorious along with his partner VIP. Joshi also hosted the comedy show Ladies Special on Zee TV. He also played a small role in Sab TV's comedy show Sajan Re Jhoot Mat Bolo. He played the role of Sameer on DD National's show Bajega Band Baaja, which was followed by Sab TV's Papad Pol – Shahabuddin Rathod Ki Rangeen Duniya, where he played the role of Vinaychand. In both the series, he was paired with Ami Trivedi.

In 2012, he played the lead role of Sachin on Sony SAB TV's comedy show Golmaal Hai Bhai Sab Golmaal Hai. In the same year anchored the dance reality show Eka Peksha Ek that aired on Zee Marathi. In 2011, he played an episodic role of Siddhanth, a city boy who is married to a village belle, Gauri (played by Mukta Barve) in the show Madhu Ithe An Chandra Tithe. Later, he judged the comedy reality show Fu Bai Fu and played the role of Ghanashyam Kale in the show Eka Lagnachi Dusri Goshta opposite Mukta Barve on Zee Marathi. He has also had his own Radio show named The Swapnil Joshi Show on Red FM 93.5. In 2013, he portrayed the role of Shreyas Talvalkar opposite Sai Tamhankar in Duniyadari. In the same year, he was once again paired opposite Mukta Barve in the film Mangalashtak Once More where he played Satyajit Pathak.

In 2014, Joshi was seen opposite Sai Tamhankar once again in Sanjay Jadhav's film Pyaar Vali Love Story, which upon the release took good opening and was a hit at the box office. In 2014, Joshi also hosted a talk show Dhabal-Ek Timepass on Star Pravah. In 2015, his first appearance was in the film Mitwaa as Shivam Sarang alongside Sonalee Kulkarni and Prarthana Behere. Mitwaa opened to great response at the box office and was declared “super hit”. His next release was opposite Amruta Khanvilkar, Welcome Zindagi where he played Anand Prabhu. He next featured in Sanjay Jadhav's Tu Hi Re opposite Sai Tamhankar and Tejaswini Pandit. His final release of the year was Satish Rajwade's Mumbai-Pune-Mumbai 2, sequel of Mumbai-Pune-Mumbai opposite Mukta Barve where he played Gautam Pradhan. In 2016, his initial appearance was in R. Madhesh's film, Friends opposite Gauri Nalawde and alongside Sachit Patil.

He later starred in a film Laal Ishq produced by Sanjay Leela Bhansali and directed by Swapna Waghmare Joshi. It also stars Anjana Sukhani for first time in Marathi films. It released on 27 May. He is also starring in a film Fugay along with Subodh Bhave and directed by Swapna Waghmare Joshi. He is also starred in the Marathi film Bhikari directed by Ganesh Acharya.

== Personal life ==
Swapnil married the dentist Aparna in 2005, but they were divorced in 2009. After two years, he married dentist Leena Aradhye. They have two children together, a daughter named Myra and a son named Raghav.

== Filmography ==
=== Films ===
Key
†	Denotes films that have not yet been released

Year	Title	Role	Ref.
1991	Jeeva Sakha	Younger Jeeva	
1997	Ghulam-E-Mustafa	Vikram Dixit	
2002	Dil Vil Pyar Vyar	Anil	
2004	Manini	Deepak Rajyadhakshya	
2008	Checkmate	Mohan Bhave	
2008	Target	Swapnil	
2008	Aamhi Satpute	Chingalya	
2010	Mumbai-Pune-Mumbai	Gautam Pradhan	
2011	The Life Zindagi	Yash 'Nadan' K. Kumar	
2013	Duniyadari	Shreyas Talvalkar	
2013	Govinda	Rajan Mayekar	
2013	Mangalashtak Once More	Satyajit	
2014	Por Bazaar	Special Appearance	
2014	Pyaar Vali Love Story	Amar	
2015	Mitwaa	Shivam Sarang	
2015	2 Premi Premache	Yash	
2015	Welcome Zindagi	Anand Prabhu	
2015	Tu Hi Re	Siddharth	
2015	Mumbai-Pune-Mumbai 2	Gautam Pradhan	
2016	Friends	Neil	
2016	Laal Ishq	Yash Patwardhan	
2017	Fugay	Aditya	
2017	Bhikari	Samrat Jaikar	
2017	Ranangan	Shlok/Avinash/ Sagar	
2018	Mumbai Pune Mumbai 3	Gautam Pradhan	
2019	Mi Pan Sachin	Sachin	
2019	Mogra Phulaalaa	Sunil Kulkarni	
2021	Bali	Shrikant	
2023	Vaalvi	Aniket	
2024	Nach Ga Ghuma	Himself	
2024	Bai Ga	Dhanush	
2024	Navra Maza Navsacha 2	Lambodar Deshpande	
2025	Jilabi	Vijay Karmarkar	
2025	ChikiChiki BooBoomBoom	Vaibhav	
2025	SuSheela SuJeet	Sujeet	
2025	Shubhchintak	Vishwas	
2025	Premachi Goshta 2	Aburao	
2026	Macho		
TBA	Sutka †	TBA	

=== Television ===
Year	Title	Role	Notes	Ref.
1989	Uttar Ramayan	Kush	Television debut	
1993	Shri Krishna	Bal Krishna		
1993-1997	Campus	Krishna	Episode 171 onwards	
1997–2002	Amanat	Inder		
1998–1999	Dil Vil Pyar Vyar	Anil		
1999	Nanhe Jasoos	Detective		
1999–2000	Hudd Kar Di	Neeraj Dhanwa		
2000–03	Kehta Hai Dil	Dhruv		
2002–03	Bhabhi	Dr. Prakash		
2001–05	Des Mein Niklla Hoga Chand	Samarjeet Kent		
2004	Tere Gharchya Samor			
2004–08	Adhuri Ek Kahani	Yash Patwardhan		
2005	Hare Kkaanch Ki Choodiyaan	Sunny		
2006	Kadvee Khattee Meethi	Arjun		
2007	Comedy Circus	Himself	Contestant	
2008	Comedy Circus 2	Himself	Contestant	
2008	Mr. & Ms. TV	Himself	Contestant	
2008	Comedy Circus Kaante Ki Takkar	Himself	Contestant	
2008	Comedy Circus 20 – 20	Himself	Contestant	
2008–09	Chota Packet Bada Dhamaka	Himself	Host	
2008	Ardhangini	Pratap		
2009	Ladies Special	Himself	Host	
2009	Comedy Circus – Chinchpokli To China	Contestant		
2009	Navat Kay Aahe	Himself	Host	
2010	Comedy Circus Dekh India Dekh	Himself	Contestant	
2010	Comedy Circus Maha Sangram	Himself	Contestant	
2009	Ghar Ki Baat Hai	Kapil Kumar		
2009–10	Bajega Band Baaja	Sameer		
2009–12	Sajan Re Jhoot Mat Bolo	Bhavesh Bhavsar		
2010–11	Papad Pol – Shahabuddin Rathod Ki Rangeen Duniya	Vinay Chand Parikh		
2010	Comedy Circus Ke Superstars	Himself	Contestant	
2011	Madhu Ithe An Chandra Tithe	Siddhanth	Guest Appearance	
2011	Comedy Circus Ke Tansen	Himself	Contestant	
2011	Eka Peksha Ek	Himself	Host	
2010-2014	Fu Bai Fu	Himself	Judge	
2012	Eka Lagnachi Dusri Goshta	Ghanashyam Kale		
2012	Golmaal Hai Bhai Sab Golmaal Hai	Sachin		
2014	Dhabal Ek Timepass	Himself	Host	
2014	Jawai Vikat Ghene Aahe	Himself	Guest	
2016	Kon Hoeel Marathi Crorepati	Himself	Host	
2018	Bigg Boss Marathi 1	Himself	Guest	
2019	Kanala Khada	Himself	Guest	
2019	Khatra Khatra Khatra	Himself	Guest	
2019	No. 1 Yaari	Himself	Host	
2019	Jeevlaga	Vishwas Deshpande		
2020–2024	Chala Hawa Yeu Dya	Himself		
2022 – 2023	Tu Tevha Tashi	Saurabh Patwardhan	Lead role	

=== Web series ===
Year	Title	Platform	Role	Ref.
2020	Samantar	MX Player	Kumar Mahajan	
2021	Samantar 2	MX Player	Kumar Mahajan	

=== Theatre ===
- Get Well Soon
- Lagna Panchami

=== Radio ===
- Share it with Swwapnil

=== Dubbing artist ===
- Dhira (2020)

== Awards and nominations ==
Awards from popular organisations
Year	Awards	Category	Work
2002	Pu La Deshpande Tarunai Sanman	Tarunai Award	Dil Vil Pyar Vyar
2008	Maharashtra State Film Awards	Best Supporting Actor	Checkmate
2012	Pu La Deshpande Tarunai Sanman	Tarunai Award	Mumbai-Pune-Mumbai
2013	MICTA	Best Actor	Duniyadari
2013	Maharashtracha Favourite Kon?	Favourite Actor	Duniyadari
2013	Maharashtracha Favourite Kon?	Favourite Style Icon	Duniyadari
2014	Maharashtra State Film Awards	Best Actor	Duniyadari
2014	Raja Paranjape Sanman	Best Actor	Duniyadari
2017	Lokmat Awards	Maharashtra's Most Stylish MI Lokmat	Mumbai-Pune-Mumbai 2
2017	Lokmat Awards	Maharashtra's Most Stylish Readers Choice Awards Lokmat Style Award	Mumbai-Pune-Mumbai 2
2018	Maharashtracha Favourite Kon?	Favourite Style Icon	Mumbai-Pune-Mumbai 3
2019	Lokmat Awards	Maharashtra's Most Stylish Actor Marathi Contribution to Regional Cinema	Mogra Phulaalaa
2019	Sakaal Premier Awards	Best Actor	Mogra Phulaalaa
