= Coffee Ani Barach Kahi =

- Directed by: Prakash Kunte
- Written by: Aditi Moghe
- Produced by: Prakash Kunte
- Starring: Vaibhav Tatwawaadi; Prarthana Behere; Neha Mahajan; Bhushan Pradhan; Suyash Tilak
- Edited by: Mayur Hardas
- Music by: Gajanan Vatve; Aditya Bedekar
- Production company: Motionscape Entertainment
- Distributed by: Everest Entertainment
- Release date: 3 April 2015
- Running time: 101 minutes
- Country: India
- Language: Marathi

Coffee Ani Barach Kahi is a Marathi-language film, directed and produced by Prakash Kunte. It stars Vaibhav Tatwawaadi, Prarthana Behere, Neha Mahajan, Bhushan Pradhan and Suyash Tilak. The film was released on 3 April 2015.

== Synopsis ==
The story of a relationship seen from the different perspectives of two young people. Jaai and Nishad find it difficult to reconcile the feelings they have for each other as they navigate their misunderstandings.

== Cast ==
- Vaibhav Tatwawaadi as Nishad
- Prarthana Behere as Jaai
- Neha Mahajan as Abha (Jaai's Younger Sister)
- Bhushan Pradhan as Anish
- Suyash Tilak as Nikhil
- Sandesh Kulkarni as Paresh (Coffee Shop Manager)
- Anita Date-Kelkar
- Vidyadhar Joshi as Jaai's Father
- Ashwini Ekbote as Jaai's Mother
- Avinash Narkar as Nishad's Father
- Ila Bhate as Nikhil's Mother

== Soundtrack ==
Coffee Ani Barach Kahi

Soundtrack album by Gajanan Vatve & Aditya Bedekar
- Released: 11 March 2015
- Recorded: Dawn Studios, Pune
- Genre: Feature film soundtrack
- Length: 6:53
- Language: Marathi
- Label: Zee Music Company

The music of the film is composed by Late Shri Gajanan Valve and Aditya Bedekar with lyrics are penned by Mangesh Padgaonkar and Yogesh Damle. Aditya Bedekar makes his debut with this film.

=== Track listing ===
No.	Title	Lyrics	Music	Singer(s)	Length
1.	"Rang He Nave Nave"	Yogesh Damle	Aditya Bedekar	Shashaa Tirupati	2:51
2.	"Tu Astis Tar"	Mangesh Padgaonkar	Gajanan Vatve	Pt. Sanjeev Abhyankar	1:53
3.	"Coffee Ani Barach Kahi"	Yogesh Damle	Aditya Bedekar	Rohit Raut & Shashaa Tirupati	2:49
Total length:					6:53

== Critical reception ==
Coffee Ani Barach Kahi received Positive reviews from critics. A reviewer of Maharashtra Times gave the film 3.5 stars out of 5 and says "Prakash Kunte has given a good package in his first movie. Only the life of the story they chose is not very long. The length of the movie seems long in comparison. Sometimes it lingers. But this slowness is overshadowed by the freshness of the arrangement, the music". A Reviewer of Loksatta wrote "Despite being a manageable love story, it is bombarded with songs and avoids the 'typical' scenes of love stories that the audience has seen thousands of times on the silver screen". A Reviewer of Divya Marathi wrote "A beautiful love story has blossomed. However, the film still feels like it moves too slowly. 2 hours are given to tell a story that can be told in 20 minutes or half an hour. This is a family watchable movie".
