= Prarthana Behere =

Indian actress (born 1983)

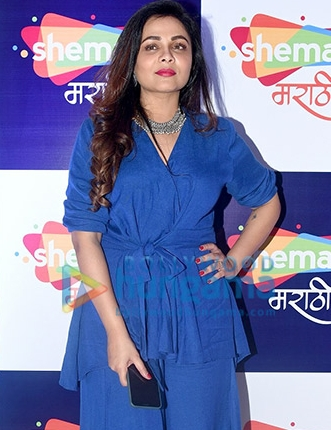
- Behere in 2020
- Born: 5 January 1983 (age 43); Vadodara, Gujarat, India
- Occupation: Actress
- Years active: 2009–present
- Known for: Pavitra Rishta; Majhi Tujhi Reshimgath; Mitwaa
- Spouse: Abhishek Jawkar (m. 2017)

Prarthana Behere (born 5 January 1983) is an Indian actress who works in Hindi television and Hindi and Marathi films. She started her career at 16 and is known for her role in the Zee TV television show Pavitra Rishta as Vaishali Karanjkar. She is the winner of 9X Jhakaas Heroine Hunt Season 1. She debuted on Marathi television in 2021 playing lead character as Neha Kamat in Zee Marathi's Majhi Tujhi Reshimgath.

== Career ==
She started her career with the Marathi film Rita in 2009. She got featured in the Marathi film Mai Lek as Leelavati in the year 2010. She debuted in television with Zee TV's Pavitra Rishta playing the role of Vaishali in 2009. She made her Bollywood film debut with Love U... Mr. Kalakaar! in 2011 as Kamya. In the same year, she appeared in a supporting role in Bodyguard. She made her lead Marathi film in Jai Maharashtra Dhaba Bhatinda as a Punjabi girl Jaspinder Kaur in 2013. After that, she appeared in commercially successful films such as Mitwaa (2015), Coffee Ani Barach Kahi (2015), Vakratunda Mahakaaya (2015), Mr. and Mrs. Sadachari (2016), Fugay (2017) and Ti & Ti (2020).

She played a lead role in Zee Marathi's show Majhi Tujhi Reshimgath from 2021 to 2023.

== Personal life ==
Behere was born on 5 January 1983 in Vadodara, Gujarat in a Marathi family. She married film director and writer, Abhishek Jawkar in November 2017 in Goa.

== Filmography ==
=== Films ===
| Year | Title | Role | Notes | Ref(s) |
|---|---|---|---|---|
| 2009 | Rita | Anuradha Salvi | | |
| 2010 | Mai Lek | Leelavati | | |
| 2011 | Love U...Mr. Kalakaar! | Kamya | Hindi film | |
| 2011 | Bodyguard | | Hindi film | |
| 2013 | Jai Maharashtra Dhaba Bhatinda | Jaspinder Kaur | | |
| 2015 | Mitwaa | Avani | | |
| 2015 | Coffee Ani Barach Kahi | Jaai | | |
| 2015 | Tujhya Vin Mar Javaan | Nisha | | |
| 2015 | Biker’s Adda | Aditi | | |
| 2015 | Vakratunda Mahakaaya | Kishori | | |
| 2016 | Mr. and Mrs. Sadachari | Gargi | | |
| 2016 | Wajah Tum Ho | Rajni | Hindi film | |
| 2017 | Fugay | Jaai | | |
| 2017 | Anaan | Neel | | |
| 2017 | Hostel Days | Ishani | | |
| 2018 | Barayan | Dr. Khushi | | |
| 2018 | What's Up Lagna | Ananya | | |
| 2018 | Ranangan | Priya | | |
| 2018 | Lagna Mubarak | Sara | | |
| 2018 | Maskaa | Maya | | |
| 2019 | Love You Zindagi | Riya | | |
| 2019 | Readymix | Nupur | | |
| 2019 | Ti and Ti | Sai | | |
| 2019 | Smile Please | | | |
| 2021 | Ajinkya | Rittika | | |
| 2024 | Rangeet | Karuna | | |
| 2024 | Bai Ga | Aboli | | |
| 2025 | ChikiChiki BooBoomBoom | Dhanashree | | |
| 2025 | Ambat Shaukin | Ashmita | | |
| 2025 | Better Half Chi Love Story | Mona Mondkar | | |
| 2026 | Aga Aga Sunbai! Kay Mhantay Sasubai? | Manasvi | | |
| 2026 | Sakhe Ga Saajani | Namrata Bhave | | |
| 2026 | Mardini | Anjali Ghorpade | | |

=== Television ===
| Year | Title | Role | Channel | Notes | Ref(s) |
|---|---|---|---|---|---|
| 2009 | Koi Aane Ko Hai | | Colors | | |
| 2009–2011 | Pavitra Rishta | Vaishali Karanjkar | Zee TV | | |
| 2009 | Crime Patrol | Noorie | Sony TV | Episode: In The name of Love (UP Murdercase) | |
| 2014 | Lux Jhakkas Heroine | Contestant | 9X Jhakaas | Winner | |
| 2017 | Love Lagna Locha | | Zee Yuva | Cameo appearance | |
| 2021 | Glitter | Sakshi | Zee5 | | |
| 2021-2022 | Meter Down | Manasi | Hungama Play | | |
| 2021–2023 | Majhi Tujhi Reshimgath | Neha Kamat | Zee Marathi | | |
| 2025 | Baipan Zindabad | | Colors Marathi | | |

== Accolades ==
| Year | Awards | Category | Work | Result | Ref. |
|---|---|---|---|---|---|
| 2016 | Filmfare Award Marathi | Best Supporting Actress | Mitwaa | Nominated | |
| 2016 | Sanskruti Kala Darpan Awards | Best Supporting Actress | Mitwaa | Won | |
| 2016 | Maharashtra State Film Awards | Best Supporting Actress | Mitwaa | Won | |
