= Swapna Waghmare Joshi =

Indian director and producer

- Born: 16 July 1966 (age 60); Vadodara, Gujarat, India
- Occupations: Director, Producer, Actress
- Years active: 1995 – present

Swapna Waghmare Joshi (born 16 July 1966) is a well-known director and producer of TV Serials. She has also directed the Bollywood films. She is well known for her direction of Rang Badalti Odhani and Damadamm. She lastly worked in recently concluded show Sanskaar – Dharohar Apnon Ki which is aired in Colors at 9 pm.

== Personal life ==
She was born in Vadodara in Gujarat.

== Television ==
No.	Name	Role
1.	Runanu Bandh	Director
2.	Ahankaar of DD Metro	Director
3.	Main	
3.	Mano Ya Na Mano	
4.	Captain House	
5.	Karma	
6.	Karam	
7.	Kalash	Director
8.	Kutumb	
9.	Kkehna Hai Kuch Mujhko	Director
10.	Hum 2 Hain Na	Director
11.	Kahaani Ghar Ghar Kii	Creative director
12.	Teen Bahuraniyaan	Director
13.	Rang Badalti Odhani	Director and Producer
14.	Devyani	(Marathi Serial) Producer
15.	Sanskaar – Dharohar Apnon Ki	Creative Producer and also doing a pivotal role of Urmila Patel – Grandmother of Bhoomi (Female Lead).

== Filmography ==
- Damadamm!
- Mitwaa
- Fugay
- Lal ishq
- Savita Damodar paranjpe
