= Mitwaa =

- Theatrical release poster
- Directed by: Swapna Waghmare-Joshi
- Written by: Jay Verma; Shirish Latkar
- Produced by: Meenakshi Sagar; Amrit Sagar; Akash Chopra Shekhar Jyoti
- Starring: Swwapnil Joshi; Sonalee Kulkarni; Prarthana Behere
- Cinematography: Prasad Bhende
- Music by: Shankar–Ehsaan–Loy; Nilesh Moharir; Amitraj & Pankaj Padghan
- Production company: Sagar Arts
- Distributed by: STV networks & Cinema Company India (CCIPL).
- Release date: 13 February 2015
- Running time: 130 minutes
- Country: India
- Language: Marathi
- Box office: ₹13.5 crore (US$1.4 million) (lifetime)

Mitwaa or Mitwa (Marathi: मितवा) is a Marathi movie produced by Sagar Pictures. starring Swwapnil Joshi, Sonalee Kulkarni and Prarthana Behere. Swwapnil Joshi and Sonalee Kulkarni appear opposite each other for the first time. The movie was remade in Bengali in 2017 as Ami Je Ke Tomar starring Ankush.

== Plot ==
Shivam Sarang, a rich hotelier from Goa, doesn't believe in love or the institution of marriage. But when he meets Nandini, a smart woman who starts working in his hotel, he is attracted to her. He proposes to her but she rejects him because of her past.

A few years earlier she was an orphan who was supposed to marry Ashwin Desai. She didn't love him but respected and trusted him. He loved her so much that he treated her like a princess. He started to teach her how to drive. During one driving attempt, they got into an accident. Nandini was safe but Ashwin was hurt while saving her and was hospitalised in a vegetative state. Doctors said he couldn't move his body at all so it was better to let him go but Nandini wasn't ready. She believed he would come back to her and was living in hope.

After much persuading Nandini agrees that she loves Shivam and she is ready to be with him but two hours of her day will be for Ashwin. Due to his insecurities, Shivam goes to meet Ashwin, but after meeting him, Ashwin dies.

Nandini blames Shivam for Ashwin's death because he met him and made him realise that Nandini is now with Shivam and therefore he has no reason to live anymore. But Ashwin's mother thanks Shivam because she believes that after seeing Shivam, Ashwin was relieved that someone was there to look after Nandini and that's the reason he left the world left happily and not in sorrow.

After sometime, Nandini also accepts the fact that she loves Shivam. Eventually they marry and have a daughter, but again when both Shivam and Nandini get into an accident she forgets everything, her marriage, her daughter, the death of Ashwin. She continues to go to hospital for two hours and talks with an empty bed assuming Ashwin is lying there.

== Cast ==
- Swwapnil Joshi as Shivam Sarang
- Sonalee Kulkarni as Nandini
- Prarthana Behere as Avani
- Aruna Irani as Rosie's aunt
- Sangram Salvi as Ashwin Desai
- Ela Bhate as Ashwin's mother
- Bageshree Nimbalkar Deshpande as co-worker

== Production ==
For the second heroine, the director wanted a fresh face. A talent hunt show to find the new face was conducted by Swwapnil Joshi on Marathi Music channel 9X Jhakaas, and Prarthana Behere was selected. The film was released on 13 February 2015.

== Soundtrack ==
"Savar Re Mana", sung by Swapnil Bandodkar, Janhavi Prabhu-Arora and composed by Nilesh Moharir became popular. The song "Dur Dur" sung by Swapnil Bandodkar Bela Shende and Adarsh Shinde also became popular. The second song "Satyam Shivam Sundaram" from the film was released in Zee Gaurav Puraskar on 26 October.

No.	Title	Singer(s)	Length
1.	"Mitwaa Title Track"	Shankar Mahadevan, Janhavi Prabhu Arora
2.	"Satyam Shivam Sundaram"	Siddharth Mahadevan
3.	"Saavar Re Mana"	Janhavi Prabhu Arora, Swapnil Bandodkar
4.	"Ivale Ivale"	Hamsika Iyer
5.	"Dur Dur"	Swanpil Bandodkar, Bela Shende, Adarsh Shinde

== Box office ==
The movie collected ₹5 crore (US$520,000) in its opening weekend. After a long run at the box office, the movie collected ₹13.5 crore (US$1.4 million) in its theatrical run.
