= Chintoo (film) =

2012 Marathi movie by Shrirang Godbole

- Directed by: Shrirang Godbole
- Screenplay by: Shrirang Godbole, Vibhavari Deshpande
- Produced by: Shrirang Godbole, Abhay Gadgil
- Cinematography: Sanjay Jadhav
- Edited by: Abhijeet Balaji Deshpande
- Music by: Saleel Kulkarni
- Production company: Indian Magic Eye Motion Pictures Pvt. Ltd.
- Release date: 18 May 2012
- Country: India
- Language: Marathi

Chintoo is a 2012 Marathi movie in India directed by Shrirang Godbole. Originally based on the popular Marathi comic strip of the same name by Charuhas Pandit, it is the story of a boy named Chintoo and his gang. It was produced by Indian Magic Eye Motion Pictures Pvt. Ltd and on 18 May 2012, the film opened to positive critical and commercial response and was widely appreciated by younger audiences. The film was directed by Shrirang Godbole. Shubhankar Atre plays the lead character of Chintoo. Subodh Bhave, Vibhawari Deshpande, and others played the supporting characters.

== Plot ==
Chintoo, a sweet and naughty boy, lives in an upper middle class, lively neighborhood with his parents. This eight-year-old is extremely popular in his group. Pappu is his best friend and Mini, Raju, Baglya, Neha and the toddler Sonu all together are deemed the unbeatable 'Wanarwede Warriors'.

Chintoo and his gang have big plans for their much awaited summer vacation. They decide to beat their rivals the Vinchoo Biters by making Wanarwede Warriors a stronger cricket team, even strong enough to win The World Cup. They practice hard and also convert the barren piece of land in the society into their very own 'Wanarwede stadium.' The match starts as planned.

Guru, a rogue, forcibly enters that space on the same day and sets up a small Chinese eatery. Akki, a watchman and Sakharam's son, is supposed to run it. The children protest against this intrusion but no one cares. The adults are in fact happy to get an easy access to the Chinese food. No one except Colonel Kaka objects to this illegal entrant and his illegitimate business in the housing complex.

The children try to find space to play cricket but always end up being scolded by adults. They try all means and ways to get their stadium back and also make the adults understand their problem. All their attempts fail until the mastermind Chintoo comes up with his own idea of making a Chinese dragon. Guru worships the dragon and Chintoo believes he will get scared and leave the ground. The Wanarwede Warriors are later joined by the Vinchoo Biters because neither of the teams have ground on which to play. In the end, Chintoo and his friends earn back their ground after their parents realise how important the ground is to them.

== Cast ==
- Chintoo – Shubhankar Atre
- Mini – Suhani Deshpande
- Baglya – Animesh Padhye
- Raju – Ved Ravade
- Pappu – Nishant Bhavsar
- Neha – Rumani Khare
- Sonu – Arjun Jog
- Chintoo's Aai – Vibhavari Deshpande
- Chintoo's Baba – Subodh Bhave
- Chintoo's Ajoba – Shriram Pendse
- Colonel Kaka – Satish Alekar
- Joshi Kaka – Dilip Prabhavalkar
- Joshi Kaku – Bharti Achrekar
- Sakharam Watchman – Vijay Nikam
- Satish Dada – Alok Rajwade
- Guru Dada – Nagesh Bhosale
- Akki – Om Bhutkar
- Art Teacher – Vijay Patwardhan
- Guruji – Prashant Tapasvi
- Chimanee – Mrinmayee Godbole
- Popat – Pankaj Gangan
- Chimanee's Father – Sanjay Lonkar
- Chimanee's Mother – Pournima Ganu Manohar
- Popat's Mother – Sadhana Sarpotdar
- Mini's Aai – Mridul Patwardhan
- Mini's Baba – Sunil Abhyankar
- Raju's Aai – Snehal Tarde
- Raju's Baba – Suraj Satav
- Neha's Aai – Soniya Khare
- Neha's Baba – Ajay Apte
- Pappu's Aai – Chitra Khare
- Pappu's Baba – Amit Patwardhan

== Sequel ==
A sequel to the first film was announced on 11 March 2013, titled "Chintoo 2: Khajinyachi Chittarkatha". The film was released across Maharashtra on 18 April 2013. The film had all the children characters played by the same actors as in the first film.
