= Umesh Jadhav =

Indian choreographer and dancer

- Born: 23 November; Mumbai, India
- Occupations: Choreographer, Dancer
- Spouse: Sonal Jadhav
- Children: 1

Umesh Jadhav is an Indian choreographer known for his work in Marathi and Hindi cinema. Active since the mid-1990s, he has choreographed songs across a wide range of films and received several accolades, including seven Maharashtra State Film Awards and two Filmfare Awards Marathi.

== Early life and career ==
Jadhav began his career in the film industry as an assistant choreographer on the Hindi film Shastra (1996). In the following years, he worked as an assistant on productions such as Sarfarosh (1999) and Khoobsurat (1999). His first independent project as a choreographer came with the Hindi film Encounter: The Killing (2002).

He later moved into Marathi cinema, where he became known for his choreography in films such as Savarkhed Ek Gaon (2004), Duniyadari (2013), Aayna Ka Bayna (2012), and Timepass (2014). Alongside his work in Marathi films, Jadhav has also continued choreographing for Hindi films, including Traffic Signal (2007), Total Siyapaa (2014), and Shaadi Mein Zaroor Aana (2017).

His style incorporates a mix of traditional Indian and contemporary dance forms. Jadhav has stated in interviews that he seeks to adapt international influences, such as Broadway stage performances, into his choreography for Indian cinema.

== Selected filmography ==
Year	Film	Language	Notes
1996	Shastra	Hindi	Assistant choreographer
1997	Dhaal	Hindi	Assistant choreographer
1998	Zor	Hindi	Assistant choreographer
1999	Silsila Hai Pyar Ka	Hindi	Assistant choreographer
1999	Sarfarosh	Hindi	Assistant choreographer
1999	Khoobsurat	Hindi	Assistant choreographer
2000	Khauff	Hindi	Assistant choreographer
2001	Aamdani Atthanni Kharcha Rupaiya	Hindi	Choreographer
2002	Maseeha	Hindi	
2002	Encounter: The Killing	Hindi	
2003	Chura Liyaa Hai Tumne	Hindi	
2004	Savarkhed Ek Gaon	Marathi	Maharashtra State Film Award for Best Choreography
2004	Chot	Hindi	
2005	Jatra: Hyalagaad Re Tyalagaad	Marathi	Maharashtra State Film Award for Best Choreography
2006	Chashme Baddoor	Marathi	Maharashtra State Film Award for Best Choreography
2007	Traffic Signal	Hindi	
2007	Ghat: The Hill Station	Hindi	
2007	Zabardast	Marathi	Maharashtra State Film Award for Best Choreography
2011	Ami Shubhash Bolchi	Bengali	
2011	Huppa Huiyya	Marathi	
2012	Aayna Ka Bayna	Marathi	
2013	Duniyadari	Marathi	
2014	Total Siyapaa	Hindi	
2014	Pyaar Vali Love Story	Marathi	
2015	Timepass 2	Marathi	
2015	Urfi	Marathi	
2017	Vitthala Shappath	Marathi	
2017	Dhamak	Marathi	
2018	Mulshi Pattern	Marathi	
2018	Lagna Mubarak	Marathi	
2019	Menaka Urvashi	Marathi	
2022	Dharmaveer	Marathi	
2022	Dil Dimag Aur Batti	Marathi	
2023	Chowk	Marathi	
2024	Hashtag Tadev Lagnam	Marathi	

== Awards and recognitions ==
=== Maharashtra State Film Awards ===
Year	Film	Nominated work	Category	Result	Ref.
2002	Aadharstambh	"Ya Re Ya"	Best Choreography	Won	
2004	Savarkhed Ek Gaon	"Aai Bhavani Tuzya Krupene"	Best Choreography	Won	
2005	Jatra	"Kombadi Palali"	Best Choreography	Won	
2006	Chashme Baddoor	"Aala Holichya Khelala Rang"	Best Choreography	Won	
2007	Zabardast	"Aaicha Gho"	Best Choreography	Won	
2015	Urfi	"Dhanak Dhanak"	Best Choreography	Nominated	
2017	Ziprya	"Alibaba"	Best Choreography	Nominated	
2018	Menaka Urvashi	"Bhalya Pahate"	Best Choreography	Won	
2022	Dharmaveer	"Ashtami"	Best Choreography	Won	

=== Filmfare Awards Marathi ===
Year	Film	Nominated work	Category	Result	Ref.
2014	Pyaar Vali Love Story	"Aali Lahar Kela Kahar"	Best Choreography	Nominated	
2015	Urfi	"Dhanak Dhanak"	Best Choreography	Won	
2016	Guru	"Filmy Filmy"	Best Choreography	Nominated	
2022	Dharmaveer	"Ashtami"	Best Choreography	Nominated	
2024	Phullwanti	"Phullwanti"	Best Choreography	Won	

=== Zee Chitra Gaurav Puraskar ===
Year	Film	Nominated work	Category	Result	Ref.
2007	Zabardast	"Aaicha Gho"	Best Choreographer	Won	
2011	Huppa Huiyya	"Kuni Lanka Jalali"	Best Choreographer	Won	
2012	Aayna Ka Bayna	"Aayna Ka Bayna"	Best Choreographer	Won	
2016	Urfi	"Dhanak Dhanak"	Best Choreographer	Won	
2017	Guru	"Filmy Filmy"	Best Choreographer	Nominated	
2019	Menaka Urvashi	"Bhalya Pahate"	Best Choreographer	Won	
2022	Dharmaveer	"Ashtami"	Best Choreographer	Nominated	
2024	Phullwanti	"Phullwanti"	Best Choreographer	Won	
