= Filmfare Award for Best Actor – Marathi =

Award in India for Marathi films

Filmfare Marathi Awards for Best Actor
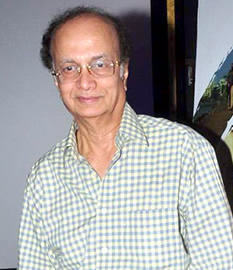
- The 2025 recipient: Dilip Prabhavalkar for Dashavatar
- Awarded for: Best Performance by an Actor in a Leading Role
- Country: India
- Presented by: Filmfare
- First award: Shriram Lagoo, Sugandhi Katta (1974)
- Currently held by: Dilip Prabhavalkar for Dashavatar (2025)
- Website: Filmfare Awards

The Filmfare Marathi Award for Best Actor is presented annually at the Filmfare Awards to an actor via a public vote or jury; it is given by Filmfare for Marathi films. Each individual entry shows the title followed by the production company and the producer. The award was first given in 1974.

== Superlatives ==
Superlative	Actor	Record
Actor with most awards	Ashok Saraf	3
Actor with most nominations	Ashok Saraf; Ankush Chaudhari; Swapnil Joshi; Amey Wagh	4
Actor with most nominations without ever winning	Swapnil Joshi	4
Actor with most nominations in a single year	Swapnil Joshi (2016)	2
Oldest winner	Dilip Prabhavalkar (2025)	82
Oldest nominee	Dilip Prabhavalkar (2025)	82
Youngest winner	Sachin Pilgaonkar (1979)	22
Youngest nominee	Sachin Pilgaonkar (1979)	22

Ashok Saraf holds the record for the most wins in the category, having received the award three times. He also leads with the highest number of nominations, with a total of four along with Swapnil Joshi (without ever winning), Ankush Chaudhari and Amey Wagh with one win each. Several actors have won the award in consecutive years, including Shriram Lagoo (1974–1975), Ashok Saraf (1982–1983), Laxmikant Berde (1984–1985), and Mohan Joshi (1997–1998). Among those with multiple wins, Vikram Gokhale, Sachin Pilgaonkar, Nana Patekar, and Dilip Prabhavalkar have each won the award twice.

On the other hand, Yashwant Dutt and Mahesh Manjrekar were each nominated twice and won once. Mohan Joshi received three nominations and won twice. Jitendra Joshi, Sachin Khedekar and Lalit Prabhakar have also been nominated three times. Other actors with notable nominations include Ravindra Mankani, Riteish Deshmukh, Subodh Bhave, Bhau Kadam, Pranav Raorane, Gashmeer Mahajani, Adinath Kothare, and Siddharth Chandekar, all of whom have been nominated twice.

Notably, Prasad Oak is the only actor to have been nominated twice for portraying the same role (Anand Dighe), winning on his first nomination. Additionally, Chandrakant Kulkarni, Subodh Bhave, and Adinath Kothare are the only individuals to have received nominations for both Best Actor and Best Director, and all three have gone on to win in the latter category. Mahesh Manjrekar and Prasad Oak are the only personalities to have won in both categories: Best Actor and Best Director.

Furthermore, Mahesh Manjrekar is the only individual to have been nominated in all three major categories—Best Actor, Best Director, and Best Supporting Actor. In terms of national crossover, Amol Palekar and Nana Patekar are the only actors to have won both the Marathi and Hindi Filmfare Award for Best Actor. Laxmikant Berde and Deepak Dobriyal have the distinction of winning the Marathi Filmfare Award and also being nominated for the Hindi (main) Filmfare Awards in other categories. Shriram Lagoo, Riteish Deshmukh, and Mohan Agashe have all been nominated in both languages as well. Sayaji Shinde and Atul Kulkarni hold the rare honor of being nominated for Filmfare Awards across three film industries—Marathi, Hindi, and South Indian cinema.

== Winner and nominees ==
=== 1970s ===
Year	Photos of winners	Actor	Role(s)	Film
1974		Shriram Lagoo	Shankar	Sugandhi Katta
1975		Shriram Lagoo	Master	Saamna
1975		No Other Nominee		
1976		Ravindra Mahajani	Arjun Bhausaheb Nanagre	Zhunj
1976		No Other Nominee		
1977		Vikram Gokhale	Deepak	Bhingri
1977		No Other Nominee		
1978		Yashwant Dutt	Bhairu	Bhairu Pailwan Ki Jay
1978		No Other Nominee		
1979		Sachin Pilgaonkar	Balasaheb Inamdar	Ashtavinayak
1979		No Other Nominee		

=== 1980s ===
Year	Photos of winners	Actor	Role(s)	Film
1980		Nilu Phule	Sampatrao Kodge	Sahakar Samrat
1981		Amol Palekar	Mukutrao Shinde	Akriet
1982		Ashok Saraf	Madan Kumar	Gondhalat Gondhal
1983		Ashok Saraf	Namdeo	Goshta Dhamaal Namyachi
1984		Laxmikant Berde	Deepak Waghmare	Lek Chalali Sasarla
1985		Laxmikant Berde	Laxmikant Wakde	Dhoom Dhadaka

=== 1990s ===
Year	Photos of winners	Actor	Role(s)	Film
1994		Vikram Gokhale	Purushottam Kamble	Vazir
1994		Ravindra Mankani	Vasudev Inamdar	Varsa Laxmicha
1994		Mohan Joshi	Dr. Madhukar Hirve	Savat Mazi Ladki
1995		Sayaji Shinde	Sayaji	Aboli
1995		Dilip Kulkarni	Avinash Pradhan	Aai
1996		Ashok Saraf	Vishwasrao	Suna Yeti Ghara
1996		Chandrakant Kulkarni	School Teacher	Bangarwadi
1996		Ravindra Mankani	Shrirang	Limited Manuski
1997		Mohan Joshi	Raosaheb	Raosaheb
1997		Dilip Prabhavalkar	Minister	Sarkarnama
1997		Yashwant Dutt	Uttam Rao	Sarkarnama
1998		Mohan Joshi	Nanasaheb Date	Tu Tithe Mee
1998		Ramesh Bhatkar	Datta	Navsacha Por
1998		Avinash Narkar	Shambhu	Paij Lagnachi
1999		Dilip Prabhavalkar	Shridhar Phadke	Ratra Aarambh
1999		Sachin Khedekar	Vasudha's brother	Gharabaher
1999		Anand Kale	Anant	Ghe Bharari

=== 2010s ===
Year	Photos of winners	Actor	Role(s)	Film	Ref.
2014		Nana Patekar	Prakash Amte	Dr. Prakash Baba Amte – The Real Hero	
2014		Atul Kulkarni	Niranjan	Happy Journey	
2014		Girish Kulkarni	Postman	Postcard	
2014		Mohan Agashe	Dr. Chakrapani Shastri (Appa)	Astu	
2014		Riteish Deshmukh	Mauli/Prince Nimbalkar	Lai Bhaari	
2015		Sachin Pilgaonkar	Khansaheb Aftab Hussain Bareliwale	Katyar Kaljat Ghusali	
2015		Ankush Chaudhari	Amit Naik	Double Seat	
2015		Subodh Bhave	Lokmanya Tilak	Lokmanya: Ek Yugpurush	
2015		Swapnil Joshi	Gautam Pradhan	Mumbai-Pune-Mumbai 2	
2015		Sumeet Raghavan	Vamanrao Ashtaputre	Sandook	
2015		Sachin Khedekar	Shyam Jagdale	Nagrik	
2016		Nana Patekar	Ganpat Belwalkar	Natsamrat	
2016		Akash Thosar	Prashant (Parshya) Kale	Sairat	
2016		Makarand Anaspure	Jumaan	Rangaa Patangaa	
2016		Jitendra Joshi	Prasanna Kamerkar	Ventilator	
2016		Swapnil Joshi	Neil	Friends	
2016		Mangesh Desai	Bhagwan Dada	Ekk Albela	
2017		Amey Wagh	Alok	Muramba	
2017		Ashok Saraf	PSI Pralhad Ghodake	Shentimental	
2017		Sachin Khedekar	Bhaskar Pandit	Baapjanma	
2017		Subodh Bhave	Shekhar Joshi	Hrudayantar	
2017		Sumedh Mudgalkar	Vikram (Vicky)	Manjha	

=== 2020s ===
Year	Photos of winners	Actor	Role(s)	Film	Ref.
2020		Deepak Dobriyal	Madhav	Baba	
2020		Amey Wagh	Nachiket Pradhan	Girlfriend	
2020		Bhau Kadam	Babanrao	Nashibvaan	
2020		Lalit Prabhakar	Gopal Joshi	Anandi Gopal	
2020		Pranav Raorane	Vasant (Vasya)	Aatpadi Nights	
2021		Ankush Chaudhari	Navnath (Dada) Ubhe	Dhurala	
2021		Bhau Kadam	Pandu Havaldar	Pandu	
2021		Gashmeer Mahajani	Aditya Deodhar	Bonus	
2021		Jitendra Joshi	Nandan	Choricha Mamla	
2021		Swapnil Joshi	Shrikant Sathe	Bali	
2021		Pranav Raorane	Preetam	Preetam	
2022		Prasad Oak	Anand Dighe	Dharmaveer	
2022		Jitendra Joshi	Nishikant Deshmukh	Godavari	
2022		Riteish Deshmukh	Satya Jadhav	Ved	
2022		Ankush Chaudhari	Suryakant (Surya) Shinde	Daagadi Chawl 2	
2022		Adinath Kothare	Daulatrao Deshmane	Chandramukhi	
2022		Sharad Kelkar	Baji Prabhu Deshpande	Har Har Mahadev	
2022		Lalit Prabhakar	Indraneel aka Sunny	Sunny	
2023		Shashank Shende	Tatya	Baaplyok	
2023		Amey Wagh	Jaggu Dada	Jaggu Ani Juliet	
2023		Ankush Chaudhari	Shahir Sable	Maharashtra Shahir	
2023		Onkar Bhojane	Bhikaji Vakhre	Sarla Ek Koti	
2023		Swapnil Joshi	Aniket	Vaalvi	
2024		Mahesh Manjrekar	Govind Shridhar Pathak	Juna Furniture	
2024		Adinath Kothare	Hanumant Kendre	Paani	
2024		Gashmeer Mahajani	Venkatadhwari Narasimha Shastri	Phullwanti	
2024		Nana Patekar	Omkar Lele	Ole Aale	
2024		Prasad Oak	Anand Dighe	Dharmaveer 2	
2024		Siddharth Chandekar	Prasanna	Sridevi Prasanna	
2025		Dilip Prabhavalkar	Babuli Mestri	Dashavatar	
2025		Amey Wagh	Prashant Dabhade (Sonu)	Fussclass Dabhade	
2025		Siddharth Chandekar	Kiran Dabhade (Pappu)	Fussclass Dabhade	
2025		Bharat Jadhav	Sakharam Manchekar	Ata Thambaycha Naay!	
2025		Lalit Prabhakar	Amar Randive	Aarpar	
2025		Mahesh Manjrekar	Keshav	Devmanus	
