= Deool Band =

2015 Indian Marathi-language drama film

- Theatrical release poster
- Directed by: Pravin Tarde; Pranit Kulkarni
- Written by: Pranit Kulkarni; Pravin Tarde; Vibhawari Deshpande; Kiran Yadnyopavit; Satish Alekar; Mahesh Manjrekar
- Screenplay by: Pravin Tarde; Pranit Kulkarni
- Story by: Raghav Shastri
- Based on: Swami Samarth
- Produced by: Jayashree Wani; Juili Wani
- Starring: Gashmeer Mahajani; Girija Joshi; Mohan Joshi; Mohan Agashe; Nivedita Saraf
- Cinematography: Prashanth Misale
- Edited by: Mayur Hardas
- Music by: Narendra Bhide; Rohit Nagbhide
- Distributed by: Panorama Studios
- Release date: 31 July 2015 (India)
- Running time: 181 minutes
- Country: India
- Language: Marathi
- Budget: ₹6 crore
- Box office: ₹20 crore

Deool Band (IAST: Dē'ūḷa Banda; lit. 'Temple closed') is a 2015 Indian Marathi-language devotional thriller drama film directed by Pravin Tarde and Pranit Kulkarni in their directorial debut. It released on 31 July 2015. It stars Gashmeer Mahajani and Girija Joshi in the lead roles, with Mohan Joshi portraying Swami Samarth– an incarnation of Lord Dattatreya. It is the story of a scientist who does not believe in god.

== Plot ==
Dr. Raghav Shastri, Indian by origin, is NASA's youngest scientist. He returns to his motherland, only to find out that his country is full of God worshippers. However, Raghav is not one of them. He has been specially invited by the PM to work on a radio frequency project, which will strengthen the coastal security of the country. The people in charge of his security receive a tip-off from their sources that a terrorist group, led by Rashida and Hafiz, have arrived in Pune to kill Raghav Shastri and cripple India's coastal security project. Subsequently, they refuse to arrange his stay at a hotel and relocate him to a posh society in Pune. He becomes agitated to find out a temple of Swami Samarth, a God whom his parents believed in a lot, within his society's premises. Raghav, who has lied to his wife Radha and daughter Popo that his mother is dead, actually has an estranged relationship with her. For so many years, he has accused her of being responsible for the death of his father, Damodar Shastri. Therefore, he decides to finish his project at the earliest and leave. In ISRO, he is warmly welcomed by his superior Dr. Vyas. However, his rival Dr. Ballar, who had previously failed in this project, is agitated at his inclusion in the group. Meanwhile, during a family outing with Raghav, Hafiz tries to kill him by bombing the mall. However, he forgets the bomb in the rickshaw itself, which is later confiscated by the Anti-Terrorism Squad, who begin a hunt for Hafiz and his teammates. The night before the submission of the project to ISRO, Raghav is upset to find out that a festival, dedicated to Swami Samarth, is being celebrated in his society. He angrily storms out of the event and makes a scene. Subsequently, he is manhandled and beaten by the residents. In retaliation, he calls up Dr. Vyas and blackmails him into shutting down the temple permanently, in exchange of the frequency project. Dr. Vyas is forced to call the police and gets the temple shut down. However, unknown to Raghav, in his absence, his daughter accidentally ends up locking his project with a password, that Raghav is unable to remember. However, the big twist happens when God Swami Samarth himself comes to Raghav to test his atheism. Next day, Raghav confides his problem to ISRO, who give him a deadline of 3 days to submit it or else, be ousted from the contract. Raghav's colleague Dr. Deshpande recommends the name of Dr. Satyajit, a world-class hacker to him. He asks him to go to Sriharikota in Andhra Pradesh, to get his project unlocked. Meanwhile Raghav's mother comes and reveals herself to her daughter-in-law and granddaughter. Raghav, reluctantly, leaves with his family for Sriharikota, without informing his security personnel. God Swami Samarth helps him recover the password by giving various hints through a pilgrimage his father was willing to complete before his death at Akkalkot.

Raghav begins his journey with his famkly and Swami Samarth, but his car breaks down and is forced to hand it over to a garage owner named Vallabh, who lends him an ambulance. Later, Raghav receives a call from Dr. Satyajit, who requests him to come to the Shripad Vallabh temple in Pithapur instead. At Pithapur, Satyajit admits he cannot crack the password, but gives Raghav a clue that the password contains five characters, one special character and two numbers.

Later, Raghav returns to pickup his car, only to find out that Vallabh has gone to Kurupuram for his mother's funeral. Raghav retrieves his car keys at the temple in Kurupuram and returns to Pune. Along the way, Raghav is caught in a rojnd road near Ganagapur. His mother heads to Ganagapur and Raghav and his family go there. Later, Raghav falls asleep while driving the car, but Swami Samarth takes him to Akkalkot instead. There, Raghav learns that his father died saving devotees from a collapsing electric pole.

Later, Raghav returns to Pune where he reopens the Swami Samarth temple in the society. Swami Samarth explains that the password has been handed to Raghav Hafiz and his aide plant a bomb in Raghav's car but the undercover RAW agents in the society gun down Hafiz's aide, rescue Popo and retrieve the laptop.

Fearing for their lives, Raghav and his family flee the society and go with an autorickshaw driver to Dindori and Trimbakeshwar. At the temple there, Raghav is shocked that Dr. Satyajit died in an accident on the day Raghav left Pune. He is shocked to encounter all the people he met during his journey, but with different identities. Mystified, Raghav recalls all the clues he found in his journey and decodes the true password- INDIA@11. Hafiz then attempts to shoot Raghav, but his bullet is blocked by Swami Samarth who protects Raghav from Hafiz's assassination attempt by taking the bullet on his own shoulder, and the RAW agents and Anti Terror Squad execute Rashida and Hafiz. Thus, Raghav ends up completing pilgrimage on his father's behalf. The movie ends with Raghav and the devotees acknowledging the greatness of Swami Samarth.

== Cast ==
- Gashmeer Mahajani as Dr. Raghav Shastri
- Girija Joshi as Radha Shastri
- Mohan Joshi as Swami Samarth
- Mohan Agashe as Dr. Vyas (ISRO Head)
- Nivedita Saraf as Rukmini Shastri
- Pravin Tarde as Shiva
- Snehal Tarde as Shanta
- Shweta Shinde as RAW agent Narayani
- Sharvari Jamenis as Rashida - Terrorist
- Ramesh Pardeshi as Hafiz - Terrorist
- Arya Ghare as Sana Shastri
- Kiran Yadnyopavit as undercover RAW agent Jalatkar
- Devika Kotkar
- Sanket Kotkar
- Devendra Gaikwad as Daya Gaikwad
- Arpan Sheth
- Akshay Tanksale as Informer
- Sunil Abhyankar as Dr. Ballal
- Sunil Barve as Dr. Satyajeet / Fruit seller
- Vibhavari Deshpande as South Indian woman / Worker
- Sandeep Pathak as Vallabh (Garage owner) / Pujari
- Ravindra Mahajani as Gajanan Maharaj / Purohita (Performer of Yajña)
- Mahesh Manjrekar as Fakir
- Prasad Oak as Security Person / Boat Rider
- Satish Alekar as Chairman
- Sushant Shelar as Car parking attendant / Politician
- Parardh Tarde as Nanya

== Release ==
The film was theatrically released on 31 July 2015 on around 110 screens throughout Maharashtra.

== Sequel ==
The Deool Band 2 was announced in April 2026 and released on 21 May 2026, become the Second highest grossing Marathi film of 2026 and the third highest grossing Marathi film of the all time.

== Box office ==
Deool Band topped the box office in Maharashtra and grossed over ₹8 crore (US$830,000) in the first four days from its release. It collected around ₹20 crore (US$2.1 million) in its run.
