= Chintoo 2: Khajinyachi Chittarkatha =

- Theatrical release poster
- Directed by: Shrirang Godbole
- Written by: Vibhavari Deshpande; Srirang Godbole
- Produced by: Abhay Gadgil; Hrishikesh Deshpande; Srirang Godbole; Chintamani Vartak; Amit Patwardhan; Rajesh Deshmukh
- Starring: Shubhankar Atre; Animesh Padhye; Amit Patwardhan; Ganesh Mayekar; Chitra Khare; Nagesh Bhonsle; Nishant Bhavsar
- Cinematography: Amalendu Chaudhary
- Edited by: Abhijit Balaji Deshpande
- Music by: Saleel Kulkarni
- Production company: Indian Magic Eye Motion Pictures
- Release date: 18 April 2013
- Running time: 117 minutes
- Country: India
- Language: Marathi

Chintoo 2: Khajinyachi Chittarkatha (transl. Chintoo 2: The Drawing Story of the Treasure) is a 2013 Indian Marathi-language children's adventure film directed by Shrirang Godbole and produced by Indian Magic Eye Motion Pictures. It is a sequel of 2012 film Chintoo. The film starring Shubhankar Atre, Animesh Padhya, Ved Ravade, Nishant Bhavsar, Rumani Khare, Nagesh Bhonsle. It was theatrically released on 18 April 2013.

== Cast ==
- Shubhankar Atre as Chintoo
- Animesh Padhya as Baglya
- Ved Ravade as Raju
- Nishant Bhavsar as Pappu
- Rumani Khare as Neha
- Nagesh Bhonsle as Bhai
- Satish Alekar as Colonel Kaka
- Ganesh Mayekar as Jadya
- Priyadarshan Jadhav
- Suhani Deshpande as Mini
- Vijay Nikam as Mhatara
- Subodh Bhave as Chintoo's father
- Vibhavari Deshpande as Chintoo's mother
- Shreeram Pendse
- Amit Patwardhan as Pappu's father
- Mridul Patwardhan as Mini's brother
- Soniya Khare as Neha's mother
- Shrirang Mahajan as Chitrakathi Kid
- Hrishikesh Joglekar Baglya's father
- Snehal Tarde as Raju's mother
- Suraj Satav
- Nandesh Umap
- Sanket Gurav
- Sushant Bane
- Chitra Khare
- Meena Naik
- Shivani Rangole
- Harshad Rajpathak

== Release ==
The film was theatrically released on 18 April 2013.
