= Filmfare Award for Best Choreography – Marathi =

Indian award for Marathi language films

Filmfare Marathi Awards for Best Choreography
- Awarded for: Best Performance by a Choreographer
- Country: India
- Presented by: Filmfare
- First award: Ganesh Acharya, Lai Bhaari "Aala Holicha San" (2014)
- Currently held by: Stanley D'Costa, April May 99 "Takumba" (2025)
- Website: Filmfare Awards

The Filmfare Marathi Award for Best Choreography is given by the Filmfare magazine as part of its annual Filmfare Awards for Marathi films.

== Winner and nominees ==
=== 2010s ===
Year	Recipient(s)	Song	Film
2014	Ganesh Acharya	Aala Holicha San	Lai Bhaari
2014	Umesh Jadhav	Ali Lahar Kela Kahar	Pyar Vali Love Story
2014	Umesh Jadhav	Yaha Vaha Sara Jahan	Pyar Vali Love Story
2014	Saroj Khan	Loot liyo	Rama Madhav
2015	Umesh Jadhav	Dhanak Dhanak	Urfi
2016	Rahul Thombre, Sanjeev Howladar	O Kaka	YZ
2016	Nagraj Manjule	Zingaat	Sairat
2016	Siddhesh Dalvi	Mitra	Kanha
2016	Umesh Jadhav	Krishna Janmla	Kanha
2016	Umesh Jadhav	Filmy Filmy	Guru
2016	Subhash Nakashe	Jagdamba	Mr & Mrs Sadachari
2017	Phulwa Khamkar	Apne Hi Rang Main	Hampi
2017	Vrushali Chavan	Parikatha	Ti Saddhya Kay Karte
2017	Ganesh Acharya	Kutha Kutha	Boyz
2017	Sujit Kumar	Lagnalu	Boyz
2017	Sujit Kumar	Janu Janu	Bhetali Tu Punha
2017	Rahul - Sanjeev	Deva Ho Deva	Bhikari
2018	NO CEREMONY		
2019	NO CEREMONY		

=== 2020s ===
Year	Recipient(s)	Song	Film
2020	Rahul Thombre	Majhi Story Cute Wali Sweet Wali Love Story	Girlfriend
2020	Rahul Thombre, Sanjeev Howlekar	Premacha Zangadgutta	Aatpadi Nights
2020	Yash, Sapan	Bol Bol Pakya	Wedding Cha Shinema
2020	Subhash Nakashe	Rani Phadakati Lakhoon	Fatteshikast
2021	NOT AWARDED		
2022	Deepali Vichare	Chandra	Chandramukhi
2022	Ashish Patil	Bai Ga	Chandramukhi
2022	Kiran Borkar	Raja Aala	Pawankhind
2022	Ranju Varghese	Angaat Aalaya	Zombivli
2022	Ranju Varghese	Ved Lavlay	Ved
2022	Umesh Jadhav	Ashtami	Dharmaveer
2023	NOT AWARDED		
2024	Umesh Jadhav	Phullwanti Title Track	Phullwanti
2025	Stanley D'Costa	Takumba	April May 99
2025	Pooja Kale	Aavshicho Gho	Dashavatar
2025	Pooja Kale	Jai Hanuman	Dashavatar
2025	Sujith Kumar	Yellow Yellow	Fussclass Dabhade

== See also ==
- Filmfare Awards Marathi
- Filmfare Awards
- Filmfare Award for Best Editing – Marathi
- Filmfare Award for Best Lyricist – Marathi
- Filmfare Award for Best Sound – Marathi
