= Ek Radha Ek Meera =

2025 Indian Marathi film by Mahesh Manjrekar

- Theatrical release poster
- Directed by: Mahesh Manjrekar
- Written by: Kiran Yadnopavit
- Produced by: Avinashkumar Prabhakar Ahaley
- Starring: Gashmeer Mahajani; Mrunmayee Deshpande; Surbhi Bhosale
- Cinematography: Ajit Reddy
- Edited by: Sarvesh Parab
- Music by: Vishal Mishra
- Production company: Ahalay's Movie Magic
- Distributed by: Panorama Studios
- Release date: 7 February 2025
- Running time: 132 minutes
- Country: India
- Language: Marathi

Ek Radha Ek Meera (transl. One Radha, One Meera) is a 2025 Indian Marathi-language romantic drama film directed by Mahesh Manjrekar and written by Kiran Yadnopavit. Produced by Avinashkumar Prabhakar Ahaley under the banner of Ahalay's Movie Magic, the film stars Gashmeer Mahajani, Mrunmayee Deshpande, and Surbhi Bhosale in lead roles. The story revolves around a guy who falls in love while studying abroad and tries to impress the girl, all while meeting a high-society girl.

== Cast ==
- Gashmeer Mahajani as Krishna
- Mrunmayee Deshpande as Manasvi
- Surbhi Bhosale as Sanvi
- Mahesh Manjrekar as Aniruddha
- Medha Manjrekar as Manasvi's Mother
- Sandeep Pathak as Einstein
- Aroh Welankar as Shail

== Production ==
The film was announced in early 2017. Initially, it was titled Rubik's Cube. It is the first Marathi film to be shot in Slovenia and is considered one of the big-budget productions in Marathi cinema.

== Soundtrack ==
The music and background score are done by Vishal Mishra.

Track listing
No.	Title	Lyrics	Singer(s)	Length
1.	"Antaricha"	Spruha Joshi	Vishal Mishra, Neeti Mohan	3:23
2.	"Jara Jara Mi Zurate"	Jitendra Joshi	Neeti Mohan	3:06
Total length:				6:06

== Marketing ==
On 23 February 2017, the music launch event took place in Mumbai, with the cast and crew in attendance, alongside Bollywood superstar Salman Khan and his fiancée, Iulia Vantur. It was also revealed at the event that Khan had provided his voice for one of the songs in the film. In April 2017, just seven days before its release, the film was stalled by the Bombay High Court due to its title. Rubik's Brand Ltd. filed a case, arguing that the commercial use of the brand name could harm its reputation and associated value.

At the end of August 2018, lead actor Gashmeer Mahajani announced the new release date and title Ek Radha Ek Meera, along with the film poster. On 3 September 2018, the film's trailer was released on the T-Series Marathi YouTube channel. On 8 October 2024, the 1 minute 45 seconds teaser of the film was released, and upon its release, the kissing scene between Mahajani and Deshpande quickly became a much-talked-about moment. In December 2024, a motion poster featuring the three main leads was unveiled, along with a new release date. The makers released the song 'Jara Jara Mee Jhurte,' sung by Neeti Mohan with lyrics written by Jitendra Joshi, in January 2025.

== Release ==
The film was initially set to release on 14 April 2017, and later on 23 November 2018. After seven years, it was revealed that the release would be on 10 January 2025, but it was subsequently postponed to 7 February 2025.
