= Deool Band 2 =

2026 Indian Marathi-language drama film

- Theatrical release poster
- Directed by: Pravin Tarde
- Written by: Pravin Tarde
- Based on: Swami Samarth
- Produced by: Kailash Wani; Jayashree Wani; Kailwalya Wani; Juili Wani
- Starring: Snehal Tarde; Mohan Joshi
- Cinematography: Prashanth Misale
- Edited by: Mayur Hardas
- Music by: Tanmay Bhide; Ruturaj Sathe
- Production company: Vatavriksha Entertainment
- Distributed by: AA Films
- Release date: 21 May 2026 (India)
- Running time: 182 minutes
- Country: India
- Language: Marathi
- Budget: ₹8–10 crore
- Box office: est. ₹102.3 crore

Deool Band 2 (transl. Temple Closed 2) is a 2026 Indian Marathi-language devotional drama film written and directed by Pravin Tarde and produced under the banner Vatavruksha Entertainment. It stars Mohan Joshi and Snehal Tarde in the lead roles, while Mangesh Desai, Sanskruti Balgude, Devendra Gaikwad, Savita Malpekar, and Pravin Tarde appear in supporting roles. Mahesh Manjrekar, Prasad Oak, and Om Bhutkar appear in special appearances. It is a sequel to the 2015 film Deool Band. The film addresses the sensitive issue of farmer suicides and explores the conflict between faith and atheism.

The film was theatrically released on 21 May 2026. It received a mainly positive response, with reviewers praising the performances and the film's social commentary on farmer suicides. At the box office, the film emerged as a surprise hit, crossing ₹100 crores at the box office, becoming the second highest-grossing Marathi film of 2026 and the third highest-grossing Marathi film of all time.

== Plot ==
The film revolves around Sangeeta Paygude, a farmer woman struggling with grief and hardship. The story begins near a riverside cremation ground, where a devastated Sangeeta emotionally calls out to God, pleading for divine intervention in her troubled life. In a moment of anger and despair, she throws a stone at an anthill shrine, after which she experiences a vision of Shri Swami Samarth.

The film further follows, Tukaram, a farmer and devoted follower of Swami Samarth, lives in a drought-stricken village where farmers struggle with debt, crop failures, and the consequences of adulterated seeds and fertilisers. Believing that divine intervention will help resolve the crisis, Tukaram leads protests against those responsible for exploiting farmers. However, when his efforts fail to bring change and the villagers continue to suffer, he becomes disillusioned. In a symbolic act of protest against both society and fate, Tukaram locks the village temple dedicated to Swami Samarth and questions the value of faith in the face of relentless hardship.

Tukaram's wife, Sangita, is practical, outspoken, and openly sceptical of religious beliefs. Swami Samarth begins accompanying Sangeeta on her journey back to her village along with her brother-in-law and Rafiq. As financial pressures increase and hope diminishes, tragedy strikes when Tukaram dies, leaving his family and the village devastated. Consumed by grief and anger, Sangita holds Swami Samarth responsible for failing to protect farmers like her husband. Determined to seek answers, she directly challenges Swami Samarth and demands that he witness the suffering endured by farming communities.

Eventually, Swami Samarth appears before Sangita and accompanies her through the village. During their journey, they encounter numerous individuals affected by corruption, debt, social inequality, and agricultural distress. Among them are struggling farmers, labourers, village leaders, moneylenders, and local power brokers whose actions have contributed to the crisis. Sangita repeatedly confronts Swami Samarth with difficult questions about faith, justice, and the apparent silence of God during times of suffering. Swami Samarth responds not through miracles but by encouraging people to recognise their own responsibilities and work collectively toward solutions.

As the story progresses, various social conflicts within the village are exposed. Families divided by disputes are encouraged to reconcile, farmers begin cooperating with one another, and villagers confront those profiting from their misery. Sadu Seth, the broker and other influential figures become involved in the unfolding events as long-standing grievances and hidden truths come to light. Through these experiences, Sangita gradually begins to understand that faith alone cannot solve human problems and that meaningful change requires collective action, compassion, and accountability.

Meanwhile, the villagers unite to address the challenges facing their community. Inspired by Swami Samarth's guidance, they attempt to rebuild trust, support struggling families, and create hope for a better future. Sangita ultimately reconciles her anger and grief, accepting that while divine faith may provide strength, it is human effort that brings lasting change. The temple is reopened, symbolising the restoration of hope and unity within the village. The film ends by highlighting the continuing struggles of farmers while emphasising resilience, social responsibility, and the balance between faith and action.

== Cast ==
- Snehal Tarde as Sangeeta Paygude
- Mohan Joshi as Swami Samarth
- Pravin Tarde as Sadusheth Shinde
- Prasad Oak as Sripada Sri Vallabha
- Mahesh Manjrekar as Sai Baba
- Om Bhutkar as Shankar Maharaj
- Anant Panshikar as Gagangiri Maharaj
- Mukund Vasule as Gajanan Maharaj
- Mangesh Desai as Tukaram Paygude
- Savita Malpekar as Radhakka Paygude; Tukaram's Mother
- Devendra Gaikwad as Dilip Patil
- Sanskruti Balgude as Rupali Shinde
- Jagannath Nivangune as Rupali's father
- Atul Kudle as Dutta Paygude
- Rushikesh Wamburkar as Rafiq
- Ramesh Pardeshi as Police inspector
- Arpita Ghogardare as Raeesa
- Vinod Vanve as Santya
- Sunil Abhyankar as Dinkar Kulkarni
- Kedar Soman as Prabhakar Kulkarni
- Pawan Pote as Digya
- Vaibhav Aaghav as Mangya
- Master Atharva as Gotya
- Komal Patil as Komal
- Amit Nagarkar as Lord Krishna (cameo)
- Gashmeer Mahajani as Dr. Raghav Shastri; special appearance

== Soundtrack ==
Track listing
No.	Title	Singer(s)	Length
1.	"Mauli Swami Samartha"	Adarsh Shinde	5:44
2.	"Khanderaya"	Chandan Kamble	4:48
3.	"Pretaroop"	Shreya Ghoshal	6:16
4.	"Pathanatya"	Urmila Dhangar, Avadhoot Gupte	5:16
Total length:			22:04

== Release ==
The film was officially announced in April 2026 and was theatrically released across Maharashtra on 21 May 2026.

== Reception ==
=== Critical reception ===
Deool Band 2 received a broadly positive response from critics, with particular praise directed at the performances of Snehal Tarde and Mohan Joshi.

Mihir Bhanage of The Times of India gave the film 3 out of 5 stars, praising its performances and exploration of faith, atheism, and farmers' issues, and wrote that "the atheist vs God Mexican standoff between Sneha Tarde and Mohan Joshi's characters give viewers some of the best moments of the film." Santosh Bhingarde of Sakal gave the film 3.5 out of 5 stars, praising Tarde's direction, writing, and acting, as well as the performances of the two leads, calling it a "perfect blend of devotion and faith." Prasad Pawar of Maharashtra Times also gave the film 3.5 out of 5 stars, writing that "Tarde has portrayed every aspect related to the farmer with precision." Anupama Gunde of Pudhari gave the film 3 stars, describing it as "a burning and blunt commentary on the current reality of Baliraja in the circle of believers and atheists, and which stings the eyes of the system and Baliraja." Sameer Ahire of Movie Talkies gave the film 2.5 out of 5 stars, writing that "while it may not qualify as quality cinema in the traditional sense, it succeeds in engaging its target audience."

=== Box office ===
Deool Band 2 crossed 25,000 advance ticket sales on BookMyShow ahead of its opening. On its opening day, the film collected ₹2.91 crore from 1,175 shows at the Indian box office, marking the eighth-biggest opening for a Marathi film in India. Over its four-day extended opening weekend, the film earned ₹15.75 crore net, equal to approximately ₹18.58 crore gross. On Sunday, Pune recorded 79.8% occupancy across 366 shows, while Mumbai saw 71.8% occupancy across 540 shows, with morning shows in Pune starting at 73% and reaching 87% by the evening. This made it the second-best opening weekend for a Marathi film, only behind Riteish Deshmukh's Raja Shivaji (2026).

By the end of its opening week, the film had collected ₹30.20 crore, recording the second-highest opening week for Marathi cinema after Raja Shivaji which had earned ₹57.70 crore. Within seven days, Deool Band 2 surpassed the domestic lifetime collection of Dharmaveer, becoming Tarde's highest-grossing directorial to date. On its tenth day, the film collected ₹1.97 crore from 1,074 shows, bringing its total India net collection to ₹35.27 crore and total India gross to ₹41.47 crore. The film had by then surpassed the lifetime collections of Katyar Kaljat Ghusali (2015), Lai Bhaari (2014), and Pawankhind (2022), becoming the sixth-highest-grossing Marathi film in India.

By its eleventh day, the film's total earnings at the domestic box office stood at ₹44.05 crore net, equal to ₹51.97 crore in gross earnings. Its second weekend collection of ₹14.25 crore surpassed Baipan Bhari Deva (2023), which previously held the record with ₹13.50 crore in its second weekend. The film collected ₹22.4 crore in its second week and earned ₹11.15 crore in its third week. As of its 32nd day, Deool Band 2 had collected ₹72.06 crore net at the Indian box office, surpassing the Marathi-version net collection of ₹70.98 crore of the bilingual film Raja Shivaji. In its fifth week, it earned ₹2.70 crore net, taking its five-week cumulative total to ₹72.67 crore net, equal to ₹85.75 crore gross. As of its theatrical run, the film has grossed ₹91.50 crore from Indian market, with an additional ₹2.45 crore from tent shows and ₹6.55 crore from overseas markets, bringing its total worldwide gross to ₹100.50 crore.
