= Hiten Paintal =

Indian film and television actor (born 1982)

- Born: 19 December 1978 (age 47); Mumbai, Maharashtra, India
- Occupation: Actor
- Years active: 2001–present
- Height: 170 cm (5 ft 7 in)
- Father: Paintal
- Relatives: Gufi Paintal (uncle)

Hiten Paintal (born 19 December 1978) is an Indian film and television actor. He is the son of veteran actor Paintal and made his debut in the 2001 film Tere Liye. He quit television in early 2008 and has since worked in films.

== Filmography ==
=== Films ===
Year	Title	Role	Notes
2001	Tere Liye	Devprakash Tandon	
2004	Dil Maange More	Bunty Kapoor	
2008	Bachna Ae Haseeno	Sachin Kulkarni	
2010	Muskurake Dekh Zara	Prakash Raj	
2010	Krantiveer		Special Appearance
2010	Benny and Babloo	Ronnie	
2011	Rascals	Nano	
2013	Love You Sohniye	Harmeet	Punjabi Film – Guest Appearance
2013	Ik Wari Haan Karde	Jimmy	Punjabi Film – Lead Role
2016	Music Meri Jaan		
2016	30 Minutes	Shashank	Hindi Film – Lead Role
2018	Tukkaa Fitt		
2026	Vibe	Abu Al Sayeed	

=== TV shows ===
- Yeh Hai Mere Apne
- A.D.Av – Acting and Dance Academy
- Ek Ladki Anjaani Si
- Kasauti Zindagi Ki
- C.I.D. (Episodic role)
- Ssshhhh...Koi Hai (Episodic role)
- Akela (Episodic role)
- Raat Hone Ko Hai (Episodic role)
- Muskuraane Ki Vajah Tum Ho as Yash
- Mehndi Wala Ghar as Amit Bansal

=== Web series ===
Year	Title	Role	Platform	Notes
2019	Ragini MMS: Returns	Veer Pratap Singh	ALTBalaji and ZEE5	
