= Sa La Te Sa La Na Te =

Upcoming Indian Marathi-language film

- Theatrical release poster
- Directed by: Santosh Kolhe
- Written by: Santosh Kolhe; Shrikant Bojewar; Tejesh Ghadage
- Produced by: Santosh Kolhe
- Starring: Sainkeet Kamat; Richa Agnihotri; Chhaya Kadam; Upendra Limaye
- Cinematography: Vinayak Jadhav
- Edited by: Sachin Natekar
- Music by: Rohit Nagbhide
- Production company: Studio Logical Thinkers
- Distributed by: Platoon Distributions
- Release dates: 17 December 2023 (MIFF); 7 February 2025
- Running time: 143 minutes
- Country: India
- Language: Marathi

Sa La Te Sa La Na Te is a 2023 Indian Marathi-language drama film directed, co-written, and produced by Santosh Kolhe under the banner of Studio Logical Thinkers. The film features Sainkeet Kamat, Richa Agnihotri, Chhaya Kadam and Upendra Limaye in pivotal roles. It follows the story of a news channel journalist and an environmentalist, exploring their relationship in the Vidarbha region of Maharashtra. The film's cinematography is handled by Vinayak Jadhav, with editing by Sachin Natekar.

== Cast ==
- Sainkeet Kamat as Tejas Deshmukh
- Richa Agnihotri as Samidha Palkar
- Chhaya Kadam as Inspector Jayshree Borade
- Upendra Limaye as Hasanbhai
- Padmanabh Bind
- Mangal Kenkare
- Vandana Vaknis
- Sudesh Mhashilkar
- Ramesh Chandne
- Siddhirupa Karmarkar

== Music ==
A promotional rap song was released a week before the film's release, featuring Sainkeet Kamat and Richa Agnihotri. The song is sung by Sujay Jibberish and Aastha Lohar, with composition by Aniruddha Nimkar.

== Release ==
The film premiered at the 3rd Mysuru International Film Festival, where it received the Best Indian Feature Film - Special Jury Award. It was subsequently screened at the 20th Third Eye Asian Film Festival and the Jaipur International Film Festival.

The first official poster of the film was launched at Sanjay Gandhi National Park in Borivali in the presence of the film's producers, directors and artists. The poster featured a road passing through a forest. On 10 January 2025, the teaser was released in Nagpur by Union Road Transport and Highways Minister Nitin Gadkari. On 23 January, actor-director Nagraj Manjule launched the film's trailer in Pune.

== Reception ==
=== Accolades ===
Year	Award	Category	Nominee (s)	Result	Ref.
2023	Mysuru International Film Festival	Best Indian Feature Film (Special Jury Award)	Sa La Te Sa La Na Te	Won	
2024	Aaryans Sanman	Best Film	Sa La Te Sa La Na Te	Nominated	
2024	Aaryans Sanman	Best Film Critics	Sa La Te Sa La Na Te	Won	
2024	Aaryans Sanman	Best Director	Santosh Kolhe	Nominated	
2024	Aaryans Sanman	Best Story	Santosh Kolhe	Nominated	
2024	Aaryans Sanman	Best Screenplay	Shrikant Bojewar, Tejesh Ghadage	Nominated	
2024	Aaryans Sanman	Best Dialogue	Shrikant Bojewar, Tejesh Ghadage	Nominated	
2024	Aaryans Sanman	Best Actress	Richa Agnihotri	Nominated	
2024	Aaryans Sanman	Best Supporting Actress	Chhaya Kadam	Nominated	
2024	Aaryans Sanman	Best Editor	Sachin Natekar	Won	
