= Shortcut (2015 film) =

- Film poster
- Directed by: Harish Raut
- Produced by: Mukesh Choudhary; B R DEDHIA
- Starring: Vaibbhav Tatwawdi; Sanskruti Balgude; Rajesh Shringarpure
- Music by: Nilesh Moharir; Premanand; Sushant-Shankar; Puneet Dixit; Nickk; Chand Sadhwani
- Release date: 7 August 2015
- Country: India
- Language: Marathi
- Budget: ₹4.5 crore (US$470,000)

Shortcut: Disto Pan Nasto (transl. Shortcut: Seen but not there) is a 2015 Indian Marathi-language romantic thriller film written and directed by Harish Raut and produced by M.K Motion Pictures & Chitrakar Films. Shortcut was scheduled to be theatrically released on 7 August 2015.

It is based on the life of protagonist, Rohit (Vaibbhav Tatwawdi) an ace computer hacker who mysteriously gets into a legal hassle for a huge hacking case. The case is helmed by cop Rajesh Shringarpure, a no nonsense police officer. Meanwhile, his love is tested with Ishika (Sanskruti Balgude).

== Synopsis ==
“Shortcut: Disato Pan Nasato” follows Rohit Pradhan (Vaibbhav Tatwawdi), a 20-year-old man from a middle-class family who is socially withdrawn and has difficulty communicating with others. Since childhood, he has struggled to establish himself socially among his peers. He has an interest in computer algorithms and hacking and spends much of his time developing his computer skills.

Rohit meets Ishika (Sanskruti Balgude), a young woman who is intelligent and strong-willed. Rohit develops feelings for her and uses his computer skills to gain her attention. He later begins using his hacking abilities as a part-time activity, mainly to help people and address social issues. Through these activities, he gradually gains recognition for his skills.

Rohit eventually hacks the system of a leading radio channel and wins an Audi as a result. The incident increases his confidence, and he proposes to Ishika, who responds positively. However, their situation changes when ACP Rajesh Nibalkar arrests Rohit on charges of being a wanted cybercriminal. The police use Rohit’s IP address as evidence against him.

== Filming ==
Shooting of the film started at the end of 2014, in Mumbai And Karjat. It was shot on various locations in Lonavala and Out of Mumbai, and directed by Harish Raut.

== Cast ==
Cast
Rajesh Shringarpure
Vaibbhav Tatwawdi
Sanskruti Balgude
Naresh Bidkar

== Soundtrack ==
Track listing
No.	Title	Lyrics	Music	Singer(s)	Length
1.	"Makhmali"	Mandar Cholkar	Nilesh Moharir	Savani Ravindra, Kaushik Deshpande	4:50
2.	"Man Mera Awara"	Nickk	Nickk	Nick & Raahi	4:34
3.	"Maula Maula"	Puneet Dixit	Puneet Dixit	Mohammad Irfan	3:44
4.	"Gumshuda"	Vinay Narayane	Shankar	Abhishek	4:25
5.	"Tuch Tu"	Vinay Narayane	Prem Anand	Swapnil Bhandodkar	5:31
6.	"Shortcut- Title song"	Vinay Narayane	Chand Sadhwani	Amit Mishra	3:05
7.	"Maula -Reprise"	Hemant Vishwakarma, Protik Majumdar	Puneet Dixit	Asit Tripathy	3:54
