= Tuhya Dharma Koncha =

- Official poster
- Directed by: Satish Manwar
- Starring: Upendra Limaye; Vibhawari Deshpande; Kishor Kadam; Shashank Shende
- Cinematography: Parixit Warrier
- Edited by: Suchitra Sathe
- Music by: Dattaprasad Ranade
- Release date: 15 March 2013
- Country: India
- Language: Marathi

Tuhya Dharma Koncha is a 2013 Marathi language film directed by Satish Manwar, produced by Mohan Damle, Abhay Gadgil and Shrirang Godbole. The film starring Upendra Limaye, Vibhawari Deshpande, Kishor Kadam and Shashank Shende. The film won the National Film Award for Best Film on Other Social Issues at India's 61st National Film Awards. The film was released on 15 March 2013.

== Cast ==
- Upendra Limaye as Kavadu
- Vibhawari Deshpande as Bhulabai
- Suhas Palshikar as Gurudev
- Ramesh Medhekar as Goma
- Kishor Kadam as Father
- Shashank Shende as Bija
- Gouri Konge as Dhunabai
- Sneha Majgaonkar as Nun

== Production ==
Film was shot in Nandurbar

== Reception ==
A critic of Maharashtra Times said, "The characters in this movie speak Ahirani. All those dialects are not easily understood. But even in Satish's 'Gabhri's Rain' there were characters who spoke a different dialect. But the farmer's pain reached us. Why can't the audience 'relate' to Kavadu's character here. Moreover, even when a strong actor like Upendra is in this role, this role basically does not have much scope in the story". Aparna Pallavi from Down to Earth opined "The movie is worth watching, because the problem of religious persecution of tribals and forced conversions is relatively less documented in films; and also for its excellent music and performances".
