= Piccolo (2023 film) =

- Promotional release poster
- Directed by: Abhijeet Mohan Warang
- Story by: Pramod Shelar
- Produced by: Rajesh Muddapur
- Starring: Pranav Raorane; Ashwini Kasar; Kishore Choughule; Abhay Khadapkar; Vivek Walake
- Cinematography: Kartik Parmar
- Edited by: Parag Anil Sawant
- Music by: Anand Lunkad
- Production company: Fortigo Motion Pictures
- Distributed by: Filmastra Studios
- Release date: 26 January 2023
- Running time: 109 minutes
- Country: India
- Language: Marathi

Piccolo is a 2023 Indian Marathi-language musical drama film directed by Abhijeet Mohan Warang and produced by Fortigo Motion Pictures. Pranav Raorane and Ashwini Kasar in lead roles. The film was theatrically released on 26 January 2023.

== Plot ==
A local band led by Victor and Preeti is set in a small picturesque fishing village in the Konkan region of Maharashtra. The Hindu and Christian communities of this village live together in brotherhood. One day there is a fight between the two groups over a property issue and the consequences are so high that it affects Preeti and Victor's music band and members. When matters escalate, the two groups decide to have a deep sea competition, two boats set out to see which group can catch the biggest fish amid news of an impending storm at sea. The villagers, blinded by hatred, do not heed these warnings and leave despite protests from the village women and elders. According to the forecast, a severe storm will hit the village in a few hours with heavy rain and strong winds. The departed boats do not return the next day, and some more able-bodied men go out to sea to search for these fishing boats, the storm continuing. The rest of the village waits anxiously for their men to return, but there is no news for several days, until the police come to the village and tell them that some bodies have been found on the beach 10 km away, but cannot be identified. Big damage from fish bites. Unfortunately the worst is confirmed, the bodies are those of dead men from the village. Although they were strong swimmers, they could not withstand the wrath of the sea. An entire village becomes orphaned in an instant. Only the youth, women and elders are left to pick up the pieces of the destroyed village. Victor, who has always dreamed of going to Goa with his band and performing there, gives up the dream along with Preeti. Deciding that he will stay in his village and help as best he can, he adopts Dasharatha, a young orphan boy, to take care of him. He is in his music and his "piccolo" is a flute-like instrument made of metal. He also decides to teach Dasharatha the instrument. We see the entire village mourning the death of their men who are the only source of income for the village and the suffering they are going through due to their demise. And then one day Victor gets an inspiration. A Charlie Chaplin video on YouTube inspired him to create a different kind of music that would make people forget their sorrows and laugh, just like Charlie Chaplin did. Victor, Preeti and the band start making music from the heart. But he has to endure strong opposition and criticism from other villagers, who see music not only as an art, but as a way to pass the time. But the band doesn't give up. Gradually the resistance of the villagers subsides and we see the village slowly recover and get back on its feet, the women of the village are now seen working for their livelihood and it is they who finally support the band and approve of their efforts and all is well in the village again. But destiny has different plans, Victor suffers chest pains and collapses at a village party. Victor dies and the village once again descends into despair. At the funeral, attended by the entire village, Victor's mother places his piccolo in his grave. But Dasaratha rushes in and pulls out the buried piccolo, he tells the village that Victor didn't want it and starts playing the piccolo. His voice shakes Preeti out of her sobs and grief over losing Victor. She also picks up the guitar and starts playing. Slowly the whole band joins in, their final farewell to the man who saved an entire village with his love of music.

== Cast ==
- Pranav Raorane as Victor
- Ashwini Kasar as Priti
- Kishore Choughule as Rometh
- Abhay Khapadkar as Bhagwan
- Namita Gaonkar as Maria
- Vivek Walake as Ramesh
- Rakesh Kanekar as Peter
- Diksha Puralakar as Rozy
- Vishwajeet Sunil Palav as Rodricks
- Raghu Jagtap as Santosh
- Padma Vengurlekar
- Harshad Jadhav
- Rohan Jadhav
- Millind Gurav
- Shubham Sutar
- Harshad Parab
- Vidyadhar Karlekar

== Release and marketing ==
=== Theatrical ===
The film was theatrically released on 26 January 2023 coinciding Republic day of India.

=== Marketing ===
The trailer of the film was released by Raj Thackeray.

== Music ==
Piccolo

Video by Kabeer Shakya
- Released: 29 January 2023
- Genre: Feature film soundtrack
- Length: 22:32
- Language: Marathi
- Label: Panorama Music
- Producer: Abhijeet Gawde

Official audio
- Piccolo - Video Album on YouTube

Track listing
No.	Title	Lyrics	Singer (s)	Length
1.	"Bajne De Piccolo"	Harry Mallya, Kabeer Shakya	Harry Mallya, Jyotsna, Kabeer Shakya	2:06
