= Agnihotra (TV series) =

Indian Marathi language TV series

- Genre: Family drama
- Directed by: Satish Rajwade; Shrirang Godbole
- Starring: See below
- Country of origin: India
- Original language: Marathi
- No. of seasons: 2
- No. of episodes: 432

Production
- Producer: Shrirang Godbole
- News editor: Prathamesh Patkar
- Production locations: Mumbai, Maharashtra
- Camera setup: Multi-camera
- Running time: 22 minutes
- Production company: Indian Magic Eye Pvt. Ltd.

Original release
- Network: Star Pravah
- Release: 27 November 2008 – 30 April 2010

Related
- Agnihotra 2

Agnihotra (transl. Healing Fire) is an Indian Marathi language television series which aired on Star Pravah. It is directed by Satish Rajwade and produced by Shrirang Godbole under the banner of Indian Magic Eye Productions. It premiered from 27 November 2008 and ended on 30 April 2010.

== Plot ==
The Agnihotri clan has had an important tradition to follow- looking after the upkeep of the auspicious Agnihotra, a special fire enkindled for generations, ever since fire was not easy to come by/make. This traditionally enabled the Agnihotri family to attain prominence in society as a revered and respected household, abundant with knowledge of traditional Hindu rituals and a centre for wisdom and respect.

This story follows the Agnihotris of Guhagar, settled in Nashik since long back, spearheaded by the patriarch, Vinayak (Appa) Ganesh Agnihotri, a respectable figure in the city and the upholder of a staunch tradition of worshipping Lord Ganesha along with the Agnihotra.

Appa has seen the decline of the city people depending on the Agnihotra as fire making became ever so easier over the past few generations, but Appa has kept the city close with a knack of bonding people together, thanks to his knowledge of Ayurveda and his generous and caring nature. However, Appa has also seen his children, Chintamani, Mahadev, Rohini, Shripad, Usha and Dinesh drift apart from one another due to differences, something which he predicted in his astrological predictions.

In the present day, Chintamani's Elder Son, Neel Agnihotri finds out about his family's history, his grandfather's mysterious yet pragmatic personality and the enigma surrounding the Wada from his uncle, Mahadev. Fascinated by learning about his clan's history, Neel sets out on an adventure uncovering uncomfortable truths, some pertaining to the family and their differences, while some being about their traditional Lord Ganesha Idols, all of which have been given to all the separate Agnihotri siblings.

While on the hunt for the answers to these mysteries, Neel encounters a host of problems and surprising truths, many of which test the acceptance, tenacity, understanding and personal biases of the reuniting Agnihotris. As Neel looks for the answers to many of his questions, he finds help from unknown sources, many of which lead him to shocking revelations.

== Cast ==
- Mohan Agashe as Vinayak Ganesh Agnihotri
- Manasi Magikar as Laxmi Vinayak Agnihotri
- Suhas Joshi as Prabha Keshav Risbud
- Vikram Gokhale as Moreshwar Vinayak Agnihotri (Morba/Morya)
- Mohan Joshi as Chintamani Vinayak Agnihotri
  - Om Bhutkar as Young Chintamani
  - Akshay Pendse as Young Chintamani
- Ila Bhate as Mrinalini Chintamani Agnihotri
- Siddharth Chandekar as Neel Chintamani Agnihotri
- Mrinmayee Godbole as Vaidehi Chintamani Agnihotri
- Sharad Ponkshe as Mahadev Vinayak Agnihotri
  - Parth Ketkar as Young Mahadev
- Shubhangi Gokhale as Rohini Vinayak Agnihotri / Rohini Sadanand Rao
- Vinay Apte as Sadanand Rao
- Aastad Kale / Ambarish Deshpande as Abhimanyu Sadanand Rao
- Uday Tikekar as Shripad Vinayak Agnihotri
  - Advait Dadarkar as Young Shripad
- Mukta Barve as Manjula Shripad Agnihotri
- Sulekha Talwalkar as Usha Vinayak Agnihotri / Kranti Band
- Spruha Joshi as Uma Band
- Chinmay Mandlekar as Sharu Band
- Shrirang Godbole as Shrirang Pradhan
- Milind Shinde as Krishna Gurav
- Abhijeet Chavan as Gopinath Wankhede
- Pravin Tarde as Tatya Bawiskar
- Dnyanesh Wadekar as Police Inspector Hardev
- Avinash Narkar / Girish Oak as Dinesh Nimbalkar
  - Sameer Deshpande as Young Dinesh
- Meghana Vaidya as Mrs. Nimbalkar
- Mrunmayee Deshpande as Sai Dinesh Nimbalkar
- Prachi Mate / Prajakta Hanamghar as Mandira Dinesh Nimbalkar
- Anuja Sathe as Dr. Sanjana
- Sunil Abhyankar as Keshav Risbud
- Anjali Valsangkar as Tulasa Shripad Agnihotri
  - Maithili Javkar as Young Tulasa Shripad Agnihotri
- Nagesh Bhonsle as Govind (Bappa) Salunkhe
- Asha Shelar as Indra Salunkhe
- Santosh Juvekar as Captain Sahil Mudholkar
- Satish Rajwade as Police Inspector Dushyant Gambhir
- Leena Bhagwat as Shalini
- Anita Date-Kelkar
- Ramesh Medhekar as Dharma Gurav
