= Upendra Limaye =

Indian actor (b. 1969)

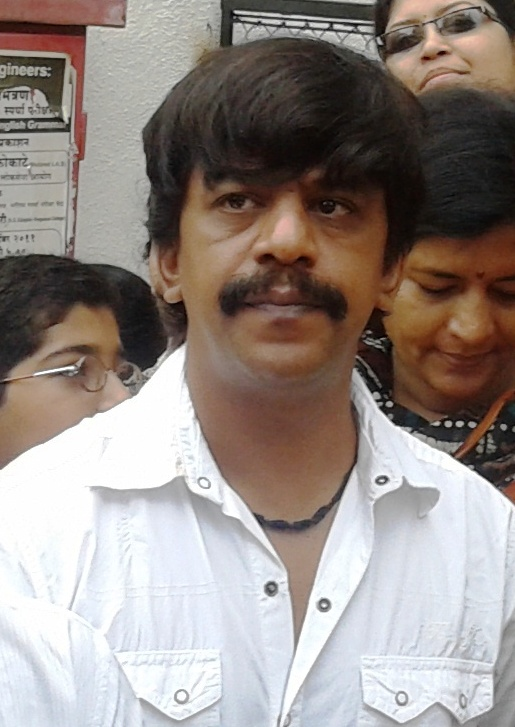
- Limaye in 2012
- Born: 8 November 1969 (age 56); Pune, Maharashtra, India
- Occupation: Actor
- Years active: 1987–present
- Spouse: Swati Limaye (m. 1996)
- Children: 2

Upendra Limaye (born 8 November 1969) is an Indian actor who works primarily in Marathi and Hindi cinema, as well as theatre and television. He has also appeared in Tamil and Telugu films. He is recipient of a National Film Award, two Maharashtra State Film Awards and a Zee Chitra Gaurav Puraskar.

He has spent much of his career working across experimental and commercial theatre alongside cinema. He known for his performances in films including Mukta, Chandni Bar, Jogwa, Yellow, Mulshi Pattern and Animal. On the centenary of Indian cinema in April 2013, Forbes included Limaye's performance in the film Jogwa on its list, "25 Greatest Acting Performances of Indian Cinema."

== Early life ==
Limaye was born on 8 November 1969 in Pune, Maharashtra. He grew up in a family without a professional background in acting and developed an interest in performing arts during his school years. He participated in plays staged as a part of school social gatherings and was more inclined towards extracurricular and cultural activities than academics.

He completed his schooling in Pune and after completing his 12th grade, pursued formal training in dramatic arts at Lalit Kala Kendra. He subsequently studied at Savitribai Phule Pune University, where he completed a Bachelor of Arts in Dramatic and a Master of Arts in Communication. His formal theatre training led him towards experimental theatre. He became associated with experimental theatre from 1987-88 and subsequently worked in Marathi theatre as an actor, director and backstage artist.

== Career ==
=== Early career ===
Limaye made his film debut with Jabbar Patel's Mukta (1994), in which he played a social activist. He subsequently appeared in Amol Palekar's Bangarwadi (1995), based on Venkatesh Madgulkar's novel, and Katha Don Ganpatravanchi (1995). He continued working predominantly in Marathi parallel cinema, appearing in films such as Sarkarnama (1998), Kairee (2000) and Dhyaas Parva (2001). His early film work placed him alongside filmmakers associated with Marathi parallel and socially oriented cinema. His first major Hindi film was Madhur Bhandarkar's Chandni Bar (2001). The film marked his entry into mainstream Hindi cinema, after which he continued to work in both Marathi and Hindi productions. He subsequently appeared as Surshya in Rajiv Patil's Savarkhed: Ek Gaon (2004) and as Inspector Bhosale in Bhandarkar's Page 3 (2005). His association with Bhandarkar continued with Traffic Signal (2007), in which he played Manya Langda. The National Film Awards catalogue lists Chandni Bar, Page 3 and Traffic Signal among his significant Hindi film credits. Limaye made his television debut in 2005 with the Marathi television series Ya Sukhano Ya, which aired on Zee Marathi, in which he played Aakash.

During the mid-2000s, Limaye expanded his work across different genres and languages. In 2006, he appeared in the Marathi film Jatra: Hyalagaad Re Tyalagaad as Ramdas Mali and in Ram Gopal Varma's Shiva as Bapu. The same year marked his Tamil-film debut with Sivappathigaram, in which he played an inspector. In 2007, he appeared as Inspector Bhaskar Reddy in Darling and as Manya Langda in Traffic Signal.

=== Established career ===
After establishing himself through Marathi parallel cinema and Hindi films, Limaye returned to prominent Marathi roles in the late 2000s. In 2008, he appeared in Sanjay Surkar's Tandala as Sawaishankar and in Urus as Mahadev. He also appeared in Ram Gopal Varma's Hindi films Sarkar Raj and Contract, playing Kantilal Vora and Goonga respectively. Tandala revolves around a woman regarded as a goddess by her community, while Contract was a crime thriller. In 2009, Limaye appeared in the Marathi film Made in China as Kailash before receiving his major breakthrough with Rajiv Patil's Jogwa. He played Tayappa, a person forced into the jogta tradition. The film dealt with the exploitation and social marginalization associated with religious customs and gender identity. His performance was widely recognised, and he won the National Film Award for Best Actor, the Maharashtra State Film Award for Best Actor and the Zee Chitra Gaurav Puraskar for Best Actorfor his portrayal. The official National Film Awards record describes his performance as a restrained and powerful portrayal of a complex character.

In 2010, Limaye portrayed Shrihari Sapkal, the husband of social activist Sindhutai Sapkal, in Anant Mahadevan's biographical film Mee Sindhutai Sapkal. The film depicts Sindhutai's journey from an impoverished childhood and an abusive marriage to her work as a social activist and caretaker of abandoned children. He also appeared as Arjun in Amol Palekar's Dhoosar. He continued to appear in Marathi films during the following years. In 2011, he appeared in My Name is 340. In 2013, he played Gautam in Kokanastha and Kavadu, the central character in Satish Manwar's Tuhya Dharma Koncha?. The latter revolves around a tribal family caught between competing religious and social forces over land and livelihood. Limaye's character Kavadu is a tribal man whose life is affected by religious conversion and the struggle for control over his community's land. The film won the National Film Award for Best Film on Other Social Issues. Limaye appeared as Guru opposite Sai Tamhankar in Guru Pournima in 2014. That year, he also played a swimming coach who trains Gauri, a young girl with down syndrome, in Mahesh Limaye's Yellow. The film follows Gauri's development through swimming and her family's efforts to help her live independently. Yellow received the Special Jury Award at the National Film Awards, while Limaye was nominated for the Filmfare Award Marathi for Best Supporting Actor for his performance.

Limaye subsequently appeared in Urfi as Inspector Avinash Kulkarni. In 2017, he portrayed Vithabai Narayangaonkar's husband in the unreleased biographical film Vitha opposite Urmilla Kanetkar. He also played Anna Bhosale, a former kabaddi player who becomes a coach, in Sur Sapata, and API Dilip Thakur in Shentimental. His performance in both earned him a nominations for the Filmfare Award for Best Supporting Actor. In 2018, Limaye played Inspector Vitthal Kadu in Pravin Tarde's Mulshi Pattern. The film portrays the socio-economic conditions of farmers affected by land acquisition around Mulshi and the resulting connection between displacement and organised crime. Limaye's character is a police officer involved in the investigation and law-enforcement side of the story. After a period away from television, he returned to the medium in 2017 with the Marathi series Nakushi – Tarihi Havihavishi, broadcast on Star Pravah.

=== Expansion into Hindi and other-language cinema ===
Following his established work in Marathi films, Limaye increasingly appeared in Hindi-language films during the late 2010s and early 2020s. In 2019, he played an inspector in Satellite Shankar. In the same year, he made his Hindi television debut with Sony Entertainment Television's Tara From Satara, a drama series centered on a young aspiring dancer and her family. He portrayed a supporting character in the series. In 2020, he appeared as Maan Singh in Bansuri: The Flute and as Reddy in Anurag Kashyap's Choked: Paisa Bolta Hai. In 2021, he played Suresh Patil in 200 – Halla Ho and Nanya Bhau in Antim: The Final Truth, the latter being a Hindi adaptation of the Marathi film Mulshi Pattern. He also returned to Marathi cinema with Preetam.

In 2022, Limaye appeared in the Marathi films Faas, as Inspector Ghorpade, and Sarsenapati Hambirrao, in which he portrayed Bahirji Naik, the historical intelligence officer associated with Chhatrapati Shivaji Maharaj. The role marked his portrayal of a historical figure in Marathi cinema. In 2023, he appeared in several Marathi and Hindi productions. In Jaggu Ani Juliet, he played Jaggu's father, a character central to the film's comic family setting. His performance earned him the Best Comedian award at the 61st Maharashtra State Film Awards. He also appeared as Tiger in Chowk and in the Marathi film Salman Society. He gained wider national visibility in Sandeep Reddy Vanga's Hindi-language crime drama Animal (2023), in which he played Freddy Patil, an arms dealer and businessman associated with Vengaskar Ordnance Ltd. His character supplies Ranvijay Singh and Balbir Singh with a large firearm and appears in one of the film's prominent action sequences. The role, although limited in screen time, attracted attention following the film's release and became one of his more recognisable Hindi-film appearances.

In 2024, Limaye appeared in Kunal Khemu's directorial debut Madgaon Express, a Hindi crime comedy produced by Excel Entertainment. He played Mendoza, a gangster who becomes involved with the three protagonists during their chaotic trip to Goa. The film follows childhood friends Dodo, Ayush and Pinku as their long-planned Goa holiday turns into a series of encounters involving criminals, drugs and the police. He also returned to Marathi cinema with Juna Furniture, in which he played Pakya.

=== Continued work across languages ===
In 2025, Limaye continued to work across Marathi, Hindi and Telugu cinema. He played Khushalpur Naresh Dhiren in the Marathi musical period film Sangeet Manapmaan, directed by Subodh Bhave. The film is based on the classic Marathi musical play Manapmaan by Krushnaji Prabhakar Khadilkar and features an ensemble cast including Bhave, Sumeet Raghavan, Vaidehi Parshurami and Nivedita Saraf.

He made his Telugu-film debut with Anil Ravipudi's Sankranthiki Vasthunam, in which he played Jailer George Antony. He subsequently appeared as a sharp shooter in Rosshan Andrrews' Hindi action thriller Deva. In Marathi cinema, he appeared as Hassanbhai in Sa La Te Sa La Na Te, while in Jaat he portrayed a prison inmate. He also appeared as a police officer in Baaghi 4. He expanded his work into Telugu cinema further with They Call Him OG, starring Pawan Kalyan, in which he portrayed the Chief Minister. The action thriller was released in September 2025. He also appeared as Phirangi, a villager and labourer, in Peddi, a Telugu sports drama released in June 2026. The film stars Ram Charan in the title role and revolves around a labourer's athletic ability and his struggle to defend his community's rights. In 2026, Limaye appeared in the Marathi film Man Aatle Manatale. He also appeared as Inspector Balagode in the Hindi comedy film Toaster and as Prithvi in Dhamaal 4.

His upcoming Marathi project Bandhu pairs him with actor Jitendra Joshi for the first time. Directed by Nitin Sindhuvijay Supekar, the film centres on the emotional bond between two brothers.

== Personal life ==
Limaye is married to Dr. Swati Limaye. They have two children, a son named Ved Limaye and a daughter named Bhairavi Limaye. He has credited his wife with providing support throughout his acting career. Bhairavi Limaye married in 2023.

== Filmography ==
Key
†	Denotes films that have not yet been released

=== Films ===
Year	Title	Role	Language	Other notes
1994	Mukta	Social Activist	Marathi	
1995	Bangarwadi	Shekoo	Marathi	
1995	Katha Don Ganpatravanchi	Rohodas	Marathi	
1998	Sarkarnama	Sapkale	Marathi	
2000	Kairee	Deshpande Teacher	Marathi	
2001	Dhyaas Parva	Press Owner	Marathi; Hindi	
2001	Chandni Bar	Gokul	Hindi	
2004	Savarkhed: Ek Gaav	Surshya	Marathi	
2005	Page 3	Inspector Bhonsale	Hindi	
2006	Jatra: Hyalagaad Re Tyalagaad	Ramdas Mali	Marathi	
2006	Blind Game	Karamchand	Marathi	
2006	Shiva	Bapu	Hindi	
2006	Sivappathigaram	Inspector	Tamil	
2007	Darling	Inspector Bhaskar Reddy	Hindi	
2007	Traffic Signal	Manya Langda	Hindi	
2007	Pranali	Sultan	Hindi	
2008	Tandala	Sawaishankar	Marathi	
2008	Urus	Mahadev	Marathi	
2008	Sarkar Raj	Kantilal Vora	Hindi	
2008	Contract	Goonga	Hindi	
2009	Made in China	Kailash	Marathi	
2009	Jogwa	Tayappa	Marathi	
2010	Mee Sindhutai Sapkal	Shrihari	Marathi	
2010	Dhoosar	Arjun	Marathi	
2010	Mahaguru	Shankar	Marathi	
2011	My Name is 340	340	Hindi	
2013	Kokanastha	Gautam	Marathi	
2013	Tuhya Dharma Koncha	Kavadu	Marathi	
2014	Gunaaji	Gunaaji	Konkani; Marathi; Hindi	
2014	Guru Pournima	Guru	Marathi	
2014	Yellow	Swimming Coach	Marathi	
2015	Urfi	Inspector Avinash Kulkarni	Marathi	
2017	Vitha	Vitha's Husband	Marathi	Unreleased
2017	Sur Sapata	Anna Bhosale	Marathi	
2017	Shentimental	API Dilip Thakur	Marathi	
2018	Mulshi Pattern	Inspector Vitthal Kadu	Marathi	
2019	Satellite Shankar	Inspector	Hindi	
2020	Bansuri: The Flute	Maan Singh	Hindi	
2020	Choked: Paisa Bolta Hai	Reddy	Hindi	
2021	200 – Halla Ho	Suresh Patil	Hindi	
2021	Antim: The Final Truth	Nanya Bhau	Hindi	
2021	Preetam	Preetam's Friend	Marathi	
2022	Faas	Inspector Ghorpade	Marathi	
2022	Sarsenapati Hambirrao	Bahirji Naik	Marathi	
2023	Jaggu Ani Juliet	Jaggu's Father	Marathi	
2023	Chowk	Tiger	Marathi	
2023	Salman Society	Unnamed	Marathi	Special appearance
2023	Animal	Freddy Patil	Hindi	
2024	Madgaon Express	Mendoza	Hindi	
2024	Juna Furniture	Pakya	Marathi	
2024	KarmaVirayan		Marathi	
2025	Sangeet Manapmaan	Khushalpur Naresh Dhiren	Marathi	
2025	Sankranthiki Vasthunam	George Antony	Telugu	
2025	Deva	Sharp Shooter	Hindi	
2025	Sa La Te Sa La Na Te	Hassanbhai	Marathi	
2025	Jaat	Prison Inmate	Hindi	
2025	Baaghi 4	Police Officer	Hindi	
2025	They Call Him OG	Chief Minister	Telugu	
2026	Peddi	Phirangi	Telugu	
2026	Man Aatale Manatale	Upendra	Marathi	
2026	Toaster	Inspector Balagode	Hindi	
2026	Dhamaal 4	Prithvi	Hindi	

=== Television ===
Year(s)	Title	Role	Language	Network
2002	Jagawegali	Kumar	Marathi	Zee Marathi
2005-2008	Ya Sukhanno Ya	Aakash	Marathi	Zee Marathi
2016-2017	Nakushi - Tarihi Havihavishi	Ranjit Shinde	Marathi	Star Pravah
2019–2020	Tara From Satara	Sachin Mane	Hindi	SET
2026	Ekaki	Inspector Sangam	Hindi	YouTube

== Accolades ==
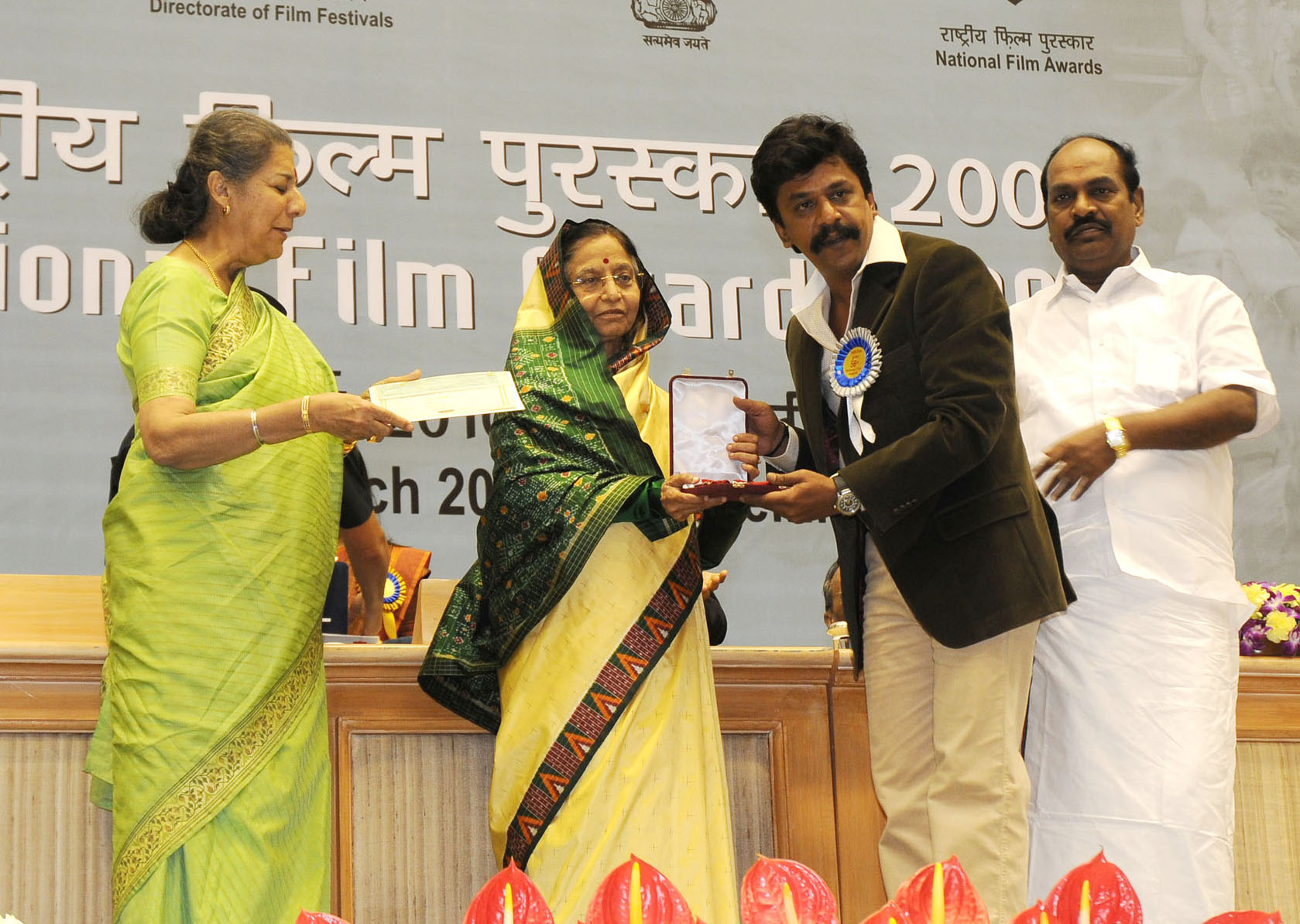
Limaye receiving the National Film Award for his performance in Jogwa at the 56th National Film Awards ceremony, 2010.

Year	Award	Category	Film	Result	Ref.
2025	Ahmedabad International Film Festival	Best Supporting Actor	High Dose	Won	
2015	Filmfare Awards Marathi	Best Supporting Actor	Yellow	Nominated	
2018	Filmfare Awards Marathi	Best Supporting Actor	Shentimental	Nominated	
2021	Filmfare Awards Marathi	Best Supporting Actor	Sur Sapata	Nominated	
2019	Indian Television Academy Awards	Best Actor Drama	Tara From Satara	Nominated	
2008	Maharashtra State Film Awards	Best Actor	Jogwa	Won	
2023	Maharashtra State Film Awards	Best Comedian	Jaggu Ani Juliet	Won	
2009	MaTa Sanman	Best Actor	Jogwa	Won	
2010	National Film Awards	Best Actor in a Leading Role	Jogwa	Won	
1996	Natya Gaurav Awards	Best Actor	Jallai Tuzi Preet	Won	
1996	Kalnirnay Awards	Best Actor	Jallai Tuzi Preet	Won	
2009	Sanskruti Kaladarpan	Best Actor	Jogwa	Won	
2009	V. Shantaram Awards	Best Actor	Jogwa	Nominated	
2009	Zee Chitra Gaurav Puraskar	Best Actor	Jogwa	Won	
2022	Zee Chitra Gaurav Puraskar	Best Actor	Jogwa	Won	
2025	Zee Chitra Gaurav Puraskar	Best Supporting Actor	Juna Furniture	Nominated	
