= Nivdung (2016 film) =

2016 Indian Marathi language film

- Directed by: Munawar Shameem
- Starring: Bhushan Pradhan; Sanskruti Balgude
- Cinematography: A Ken Sebastia
- Music by: Rafique Shaikh
- Release date: 21 October 2016
- Country: India
- Language: Marathi

Nivdung is an Indian Marathi language film directed by Munawar Shameem. The film stars Bhushan Pradhan and Sanskruti Balgude. Music by Rafique Shaikh. The film was released on 21 October 2016.

== Synopsis ==
Having tried his luck in the big city, a struggling young actor returns to his village. Along with him, comes an established theatre actress who falls in love with the place.

== Cast ==
- Bhushan Pradhan
- Sanskruti Balgude
- Sara Shrawan
- Astad Kale
- Prajakta Dighe
- Shekhar Phadke

== Soundtrack ==
Nivdung

Soundtrack album by Rafique Shaikh
- Released: 2016
- Recorded: 2016
- Genre: Feature film soundtrack
- Length: 33:52
- Language: Marathi

Official audio
- Nivdung – Full Album on YouTube

Track listing
No.	Title	Singer(s)	Length
1.	"Vitthala"	Swapnil Bandodkar	6:35
2.	"Majha Jwanila"	Urmila Dhangar	6:38
3.	"Tila Mi Pahile"	Neha Rajpal	5:36
4.	"Majhe Mala"	Neha Rajpal	6:13
5.	"Kuberacha Gharat"	Suresh Wadkar	6:12
6.	"Dhondi Dhondi"	Rafique Shaikh, Chorus	3:18
Total length:			33:52

== Critical response ==
Nivdung film received negative reviews from critics. Mihir Bhanage of The Times of India gave the film 2 stars out of 5 and wrote "Bhushan seriously needs to choose better movies. It would be a shame if his potential goes waste due to bad choices. Sanskruti does the standard village bimbette stuff although her role has scope for other things". Ganesh Matkari of Pune Mirror wrote "Nivdung is a simplistic, shallow melodrama, which is considerably inferior to the idea it springs from. Luckily, for the film, it’s not releasing against a major player in the field". Soumitra Pote of Maharashtra Times gave the film 2 stars out of 5 and wrote "When we say the name of this movie, we remember the old Nivdung. 'Ti geli tevha... Hridaynath Mangeshkar's music and grace's poetry".
