= Muskurake Dekh Zara =

2010 Indian romantic drama film

- Official poster
- Directed by: P. Som Shekar
- Written by: Anurag Kashyap
- Based on: Chiru Navvutho
- Produced by: P. Som Shekar
- Starring: Gashmeer Mahajani; Twinkle Patel; Hiten Paintal
- Music by: Ranjit Barot
- Production company: Chitra Creations
- Release date: 26 March 2010
- Country: India
- Language: Hindi

Muskurake Dekh Zara is a 2010 Indian Hindi-language romantic drama film produced and directed by P. Som Shekar and starring Gashmeer Mahajani, Twinkle Patel, and Hiten Paintal. It is an unofficial remake of the Telugu film Chiru Navvutho.

== Cast ==
- Gashmeer Mahajani as Vivek
- Twinkle Patel as Preeti
- Hiten Paintal as Prakash Raj
- Sunil Sabarwal as Amar
- Simran Suri as Gauri
- Mukesh Bhatt as DLT
- Chirag Sethi as Sunil
- Arijit Sengupta as Sourabh
- Jiten Mukhi as Mishra Ji
- Reshma Merchant as Mrs. Mishra Ji
- Ranjeet as Major
- Tiku Talsania as Chacha
- Om Katare as Anand Singhania
- Sudesh Lehri as Khaatkar
- Atul Parchure as Elton
- Rajshree Choudhary as Priya
- Khayali as Dr. Naseeb

== Production ==
Hiten Paintal plays a negative role for the first time in his career.

== Soundtrack ==
The music was composed by Ranjit Barot and had lyrics written by Mehboob.

== Reception ==
A critic from The Times of India opined that "So, is there anything to talk about when it comes to Muskurake Dekh Zara? Nothing". Taran Adarsh of Bollywood Hungama stated that "On the whole, MUSKURAKE DEKH ZARA has no chances absolutely".
