= Maharashtra State Film Award for Best Choreography =

Indian film award

- Awarded for: Best performance by choreography in a Marathi film
- First award: 1984
- Final award: 2024
- Most recent winner: Umesh Jadhav

Highlights
- Total awarded: 30
- First winner: Manohar Naidu & Pramod Naidu

Maharashtra State Film Award for Best Choreography is an award, begun in 1984, presented annually at the Maharashtra State Film Awards of India to the choreographer for best performance in a Marathi cinema. The awardees are decided by a jury constituted every year. The first award was given to Manohar Naidu & Pramod Naidu for the film Navri Mile Navryala.

== Winners ==
Year	Recipient(s)	Song	Film	Ref.
1984	Manohar Naidu	"Hi Navri Asli"	Navri Mile Navryala	
1984	Pramod Naidu	"Hi Navri Asli"	Navri Mile Navryala	
1985	Subal Sarkar	"Bamchik Bamchik Bam"	Ardhangi	
1986	Madhav Kishan	"Dhagacha Kagad"	Bijli	
1986	Pravin Kumar	"Dhagacha Kagad"	Bijli	
1987	Satyanarayan Badriprasad	"Ishkacha Bharun Dete Pela"	Bhatak Bhawani	
1988	Subal Sarkar	"Raja Ra Majhya Sonya Ra"	Majjach Majja	
1989	Subal Sarkar	"Madhuchandrachi Ratra"	Madhuchandrachi Ratra	
1989	Madhav Kishan	"Re Man Tula Vahile"	Atmavishwas	
1990	Madhav Kishan	"Aala Re Aala Ganpati Aala"	Aamchyasarkhe Aamhich	
1990	Kishan Borhade	"Aala Re Aala Ganpati Aala"	Aamchyasarkhe Aamhich	
1991	Usha Naik	"Kal Ratri Bara Vajta"	Kal Ratri Bara Vajta	
1992	Laxmibai Kolhapurkar	"Bharla Aabhali"	Ek Hota Vidushak	
1993	Prakash Hilge	"Amhi Indraachya Varangana"	Lavanyavati	
1994	Manisha Sathe	"Ya Ga Sayano"	Varsa Laxmicha	
1995	Subal Sarkar	"Tuntuna Bole Dhimdila"	Painjan	
1996	Subal Sarkar	"Tach Tachun Bandha Bharla"	Sugandha	
1997	Narendra Pandit	"Moharle Mi Sajna"	Paij Lagnachi	
1998	Subal Sarkar	"Hee Majhi Satvapariksha"	Satvapariksha	
1999	Sangeeta Sarang	"Baicha Putla"	Aai Thor Tujhe Upkar	
2000	Charusheela Sable	"Sapta Swaranno"	Raju	
2001	Deepali Vichare	"Devki Gaate Angai"	Devki	
2002	Umesh Jadhav	"Yaa Re Yaa"	Aadharstambh	
2003	Narendra Pandit	"Ghe Jhep Udyachi Gagnavar"	Tarunyachya Latevar	
2004	Umesh Jadhav	"Aai Bhavani Tuzya Krupene"	Savarkhed Ek Gaon	
2005	Umesh Jadhav	"Kombadi Palali"	Jatra	
2006	Umesh Jadhav	"Aala Holichya Khelala Rang"	Chashme Bahaddar	
2007	Umesh Jadhav	"Aaicha Gho"	Zabardast	
2008	Dr. Supriya Gadekar	"Gho Mala Asla Hava"	Gho Mala Asla Hava	
2009	Phulwa Khamkar	"Apsara Aali"	Natarang	
2010	Sharvari Jamenis	"Jhananana Baaje"	Samudra	
2011	Rajesh Bidwe	"Majhya Dolyatil Kajal"	Arjun	
2012	Subhash Nakashe	"Lal Holi"	Ajintha	
2013	Vishal Kamble	"Hi Poli Sajuk Tupatli"	Timepass	
2014	Saroj Khan	"Loot Liyo Mohe Shyam"	Rama Madhav	
2015	Raju Khan	"Malhari Martand"	Carry On Maratha	
2016	Subhash Nakashe	"Jhimma Ga Pori"	Dashakriya	
2017	Rajesh Bidwe	"Mohalla"	Shentimental	
2018	Umesh Jadhav	"Bhalya Pahate"	Menaka Urvashi	
2019	Subhash Nakashe	"Shivrajyabhishek Geet"	Hirkani	
2020	Sujith Kumar	"Album Kadhaal Kay"	Choricha Mamla	
2021	Phulwa Khamkar	"Chau Mau Chau Mau"	Luckdown Be Positive	
2022	Umesh Jadhav	"Aai Jagdambe"	Dharmaveer	
2023	Rahul Thombre	"Tu Bi Aan Mi Bi"	Jaggu Ani Juliet	
2023	Sanjeev Hovaladaar	"Tu Bi Aan Mi Bi"	Jaggu Ani Juliet	
2024	Umesh Jadhav	"Madan Manjiri"	Phullwanti	

== Multiple wins ==
Individuals with two or more Best Choreography awards:

Wins	Actress
8	Umesh Jadhav
6	Subal Sarkar
3	Subhash Nakashe; Madhav Kishan
2	Phulwa Khamkar; Rajesh Bidwe; Deepali Vichare; Sujith Kumar; Narendra Pandit
