= The Big Bull =

2021 Indian film by Kookie Gulati

- Poster
- Directed by: Kookie Gulati
- Screenplay by: Kookie Gulati; Arjun Dhawan
- Based on: Harshad Mehta
- Produced by: Ajay Devgn; Anand Pandit; Vikrant Sharma; Kumar Mangat Pathak
- Starring: Abhishek Bachchan; Ileana D'Cruz; Nikita Dutta
- Cinematography: Vishnu Rao
- Edited by: Dharmendra Sharma
- Music by: Songs: Gourov Dasgupta; Wily Frenzy; Mehul Vyas; Background Score: Sandeep Shirodkar
- Production companies: Ajay Devgn FFilms; Anand Pandit Motion Pictures
- Distributed by: Disney+ Hotstar
- Release date: 8 April 2021
- Running time: 154 minutes
- Country: India
- Language: Hindi

The Big Bull is a 2021 Indian Hindi-language crime drama film directed and written by Kookie Gulati, based on stockbroker Harshad Mehta who was involved in financial crimes over a period of 10 years during 1980–1990. The film stars Abhishek Bachchan, Ileana D'Cruz and Nikita Dutta. It entered production in September 2019, and was digitally released on 8 April 2021 on Disney+ Hotstar. The film received mixed reviews, praising Bachchan's performance, but criticized in comparison to the much acclaimed Scam 1992, released the previous year, which was also based on Mehta's life.

== Plot ==
Based on the life of Harshad Mehta, the movie follows the rise and fall of the stock market broker who rose from the chawls of Mumbai and became one of the big players of the Bombay Stock Exchange in the early 1990s, while the country was undergoing major changes in its economy (Economic liberalisation in India).

== Cast ==
- Abhishek Bachchan as Hemant Shah (based on Harshad Mehta)
- Ileana D'Cruz as Meera Rao (based on Sucheta Dalal)
- Nikita Dutta as Priya Patel Shah (based on Jyoti Mehta)
- Sumit Vats as Hari Vyas
- Mahesh Manjrekar as Rana Sawant
- Ram Kapoor as Ashok Mirchandani, Hemant's lawyer (based on Ram Jethmalani)
- Sohum Shah as Viren Shah, Hemant's brother, based on Ashwin Mehta
- Lekha Prajapati as Tara Shah, Viren's wife
- Supriya Pathak as Amiben Shah, Hemant's mother
- Sanjeev Pandey
- Saurabh Shukla as Mannu Malpani, Chairman of Bombay Stock Exchange
- Samir Soni as Sanjeev Kohli
- Shishir Sharma as Rajesh Mishra, Meera's Boss
- Hitesh Rawal as Kantilal
- Kanan Arunachalam as Venkateshwar
- Rio Kapadia as NCC MD Singh
- Trupti Shankadhar as Ashima
- Abhijit Lahiri as Baldev
- Anand Goradia as CBI Officer Nikhil
- Pankaj Vishnu as CBI officer Dheeraj
- Rohit Tiwari as CBI officer Rakesh
- Sanjiv Jotangia as Mr. Patel, Priya Patel's Father
- Aarjav Trivedi as Priya Patel's Fiancé
- Vijay Rajoria as Raman
- Akhil Vaid as Vikram Solanki

== Production ==
In 2018, it was reported that Ajay Devgn will produce the film with Abhishek Bachchan playing the lead role. The film is directed by Kookie Gulati and shows the financial crimes and life of Harshad Mehta. Nikita Dutta and Ileana D'Cruz were brought in to play supporting roles.

The shooting commenced on 16 September 2019. Many shots of the movie has been filmed in Gautam Buddha University.

== Release ==
Due to the COVID-19 pandemic, the film was released for streaming worldwide from 8 April 2021 on Hotstar.

== Soundtrack ==
The Big Bull

Soundtrack album by Gourov Dasgupta, Wily Frenzy and Mehul Vyas
- Released: 26 March 2021
- Recorded: 2020
- Genre: Feature film soundtrack
- Length: 15:33
- Language: Hindi
- Label: Zee Music Company

Official audio
- The Big Bull - Full Album on YouTube

The film's music was composed by Gourov Dasgupta and Mehul Vyas with lyrics written by Kunwar Juneja and Anil Verma. The rap single "Yalgaar" by CarryMinati, with music by Wily Frenzy, served as the theme song. Sandeep Shirodkar composed the background score.

Track listing
No.	Title	Lyrics	Music	Singer(s)	Length
1.	"Ishq Namazaa"	Kunwar Juneja	Gourov Dasgupta	Ankit Tiwari	4:25
2.	"Yalgaar (The Big Bull)"	CarryMinati	Wily Frenzy	CarryMinati	3:15
3.	"Hawaon Ke Sheher Mein"	Kunwar Juneja	Gourov Dasgupta	Yasser Desai	4:57
4.	"Paise Ka Nasha"	Anil Verma	Mehul Vyas	Sunidhi Chauhan	2:56
Total length:					15:33

== Reception ==
On the review aggregator website Rotten Tomatoes, 11% of 9 critics' reviews are positive, with an average rating of 3.6/10.

Saibal Chatterjee of NDTV rated the movie 1.5 out of 5 stars commenting that “the film's problems are rooted in the screenplay, stilted dialogues and arbitrary character arcs.” Writing for Film Companion, Rahul Desai called the movie a “rushed portrait of a slow-burned legacy” further adding that “Abhishek Bachchan’s version of Harshad Mehta is far more compelling than the story it defines.” Jyoti Kanyal of India Today gave the movie 2.5 out of 5 stars calling it “an interesting watch, which often oscillates between boredom and excitement.”

Ronak Kotecha of Times of India graded the film with 3 out of 5 stars and asked not to let the 'stock of expectations rise too high'. He opined that Abhishek Bachchan 'delivered a decent performance'. In conclusion of review he wrote, "Overall, The Big Bull is a decent attempt to tell a dramatic story of one of India’s biggest financial scams, orchestrated by a man, who seemed more like a common man than a con man."
