= Shrikant Bashir =

Indian edgy action-drama series

- Genre: Action-drama
- Written by: Shiraz Ahmed
- Directed by: Santosh Shetty
- Starring: Gashmeer Mahajani; Pooja Gaur; Ashmita Jaggi; Yudhishthir Singh
- Country of origin: India
- Original language: Hindi
- No. of seasons: 1
- No. of episodes: 26

Production
- Producer: Praver Awal
- Cinematography: Madhav Salunke
- Production company: Banijay Asia

Original release
- Network: SonyLIV
- Release: 11 December 2020

Shrikant Bashir is a 2020 Indian edgy action-drama original series, premiered on streaming service SonyLIV on 11 December 2020. It was written by Shiraz Ahmed and helmed by Santosh Shetty, starring Gashmeer Mahajani, Pooja Gor, Ashmita Jaggi, and Yudhishthir Singh in the lead roles. Previously titled as SOT: Surgical Operation Team, the series follows the titular duo who work for an intelligence agency that secretly works to save India from national and international threats. It was made under the production house of Banijay Asia.

== Cast ==
=== Main ===
- Gashmeer Mahajani
- Pooja Gaur
- Ashmita Jaggi
- Yudhishthir Singh
- Bikramjeet Kanwarpal
- Mantra
- Mukul Dev

=== Recurring ===
- Sanjeev Pandey as Manjit Saxena
- Tanuka Laghate
- Dawood Khan
- Kunal Pant
- Imran Javed
- Bharat Patni
- Tareeq Ahmed Khan
- Shivraj Walvekar
- Chirag Bhanot
- Swarnim
- Savita Malpekar
- Rohit Choudhary
- Geetika Mehandru
- Nirbhay Wadhwa
- Sahil Chaddha
- Saurabh Sharma
- Vivana Singh
- Pooran Kiri
- Sushil Johri
- Chaya Devi
- Tarun Dudeja
- Gaurav Nain
- Saurabh Agrawal
- Laveena Tandon
- Vishwa Gulati
- Arun Gosani
- Rasik Dave
- Shyamraj Patil
- Bharat Chawla
- Sanatan Modi
- Rajat Malhotra
- Kunal Sharma
- Shaamraj Shaamraj
- Hitesh Sejpal
- Vishnu Vyas
- Amit Khare
- Pushpendra
- Rohit Chaudhary
- Kanchi Bansali
- Noyrika Bhatheja
- Ajit Shidhaye
- Payas Pandit
- Alok Sunger (raaj sunger)
- Navneet Sharma
- Nikhil Zope
- Mahesh Panavalkar
- Abhinav Attri
- Gargi Joshi
- Mohd Khaliq
- Shrushti Maheshwari
- Sushant Jain
- Deval Joshi
- Lokesh Tewari
- Shekhar Shashank
- Renil Shah
- Pushpendra Tiwari
- Garima Agarwal
- Akanksha Saini
- Rahul Sahu
- Nehika Singh Rajput
- Badrish Chhabra
- Kartik Baba

== Episodes ==
=== Season 1 ===
Series	Episodes	Originally released
1	26	11 December 2020

No. overall	No. in season	Title	Directed by	Written by	Original release date
1	1	"The Stolen Codes"	Santosh Shetty	Shiraz Ahmed	11 December 2020
2	2	"A Tragic Twist"	Santosh Shetty	Shiraz Ahmed	11 December 2020
3	3	"The Scam"	Santosh Shetty	Shiraz Ahmed	11 December 2020
4	4	"Welcome to the Lion's Den"	Santosh Shetty	Shiraz Ahmed	11 December 2020
5	5	"Cheers"	Santosh Shetty	Shiraz Ahmed	11 December 2020
6	6	"The Trojan Horse"	Santosh Shetty	Shiraz Ahmed	11 December 2020
7	7	"Evil: The Genesis"	Santosh Shetty	Shiraz Ahmed	11 December 2020
8	8	"A String Operation"	Santosh Shetty	Shiraz Ahmed	11 December 2020
9	9	"Hunt the Hunter"	Santosh Shetty	Shiraz Ahmed	11 December 2020
10	10	"First Victim"	Santosh Shetty	Shiraz Ahmed	11 December 2020
11	11	"Catch Me If You Can"	Santosh Shetty	Shiraz Ahmed	11 December 2020
12	12	"The Karma"	Santosh Shetty	Shiraz Ahmed	11 December 2020
13	13	"ROF-Ring Of Fire"	Santosh Shetty	Shiraz Ahmed	11 December 2020
14	14	"The Ultimate Chase"	Santosh Shetty	Shiraz Ahmed	11 December 2020
15	15	"The Apocalypse"	Santosh Shetty	Shiraz Ahmed	11 December 2020
16	16	"The Mastermind"	Santosh Shetty	Shiraz Ahmed	11 December 2020
17	17	"Tryst with Destiney"	Santosh Shetty	Shiraz Ahmed	11 December 2020
18	18	"Lockdown"	Santosh Shetty	Shiraz Ahmed	11 December 2020
19	19	"Checkmate"	Santosh Shetty	Shiraz Ahmed	11 December 2020
20	20	"A Quantum Leap"	Santosh Shetty	Shiraz Ahmed	11 December 2020
21	21	"Ray Of Hope"	Santosh Shetty	Shiraz Ahmed	11 December 2020
22	22	"Under Arrest"	Santosh Shetty	Shiraz Ahmed	11 December 2020
23	23	"Plan Of Action"	Santosh Shetty	Shiraz Ahmed	11 December 2020
24	24	"Dead End"	Santosh Shetty	Shiraz Ahmed	11 December 2020
25	25	"The Mission Unfolds"	Santosh Shetty	Shiraz Ahmed	11 December 2020
26	26	"The Surgical Strike"	Santosh Shetty	Shiraz Ahmed	11 December 2020

== Reception ==
=== Critical reviews ===
The series received mixed reviews

Joginder Tuteja of Koimoi, a Bollywood entertainment website, rated the series at a 3/5, saying "Overall though, even if Shrikant Bashir may not go down as totally unique, what works in its favor is the fact that it is fast paced and ensures that audiences are hooked on to the proceedings. Notwithstanding the stock background score pieces that keep repeating themselves time and again, one can give this one as a comfortable watch with the entire family."

A reviewer for Mashable wrote "Gashmeer Mahajani and Yudhishtir Singh are on two ends of the acting spectrum in Shrikant Bashir and everyone else kind of falls somewhere in between."
