= Sanskruti Balgude =

Indian actress

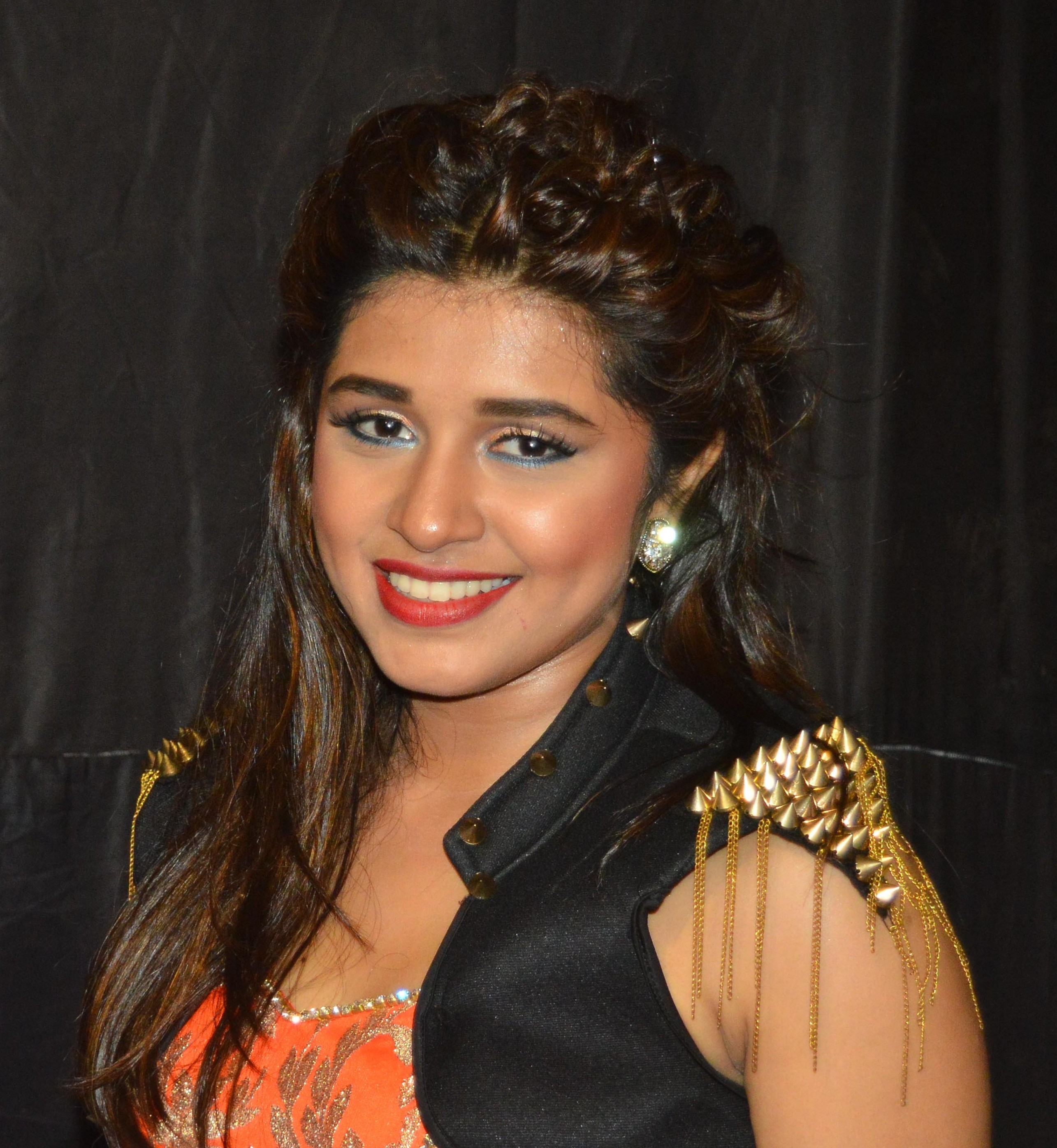
- Balgude in 2016
- Born: 19 December 1992 (age 33); Pune, Maharashtra
- Occupation: Actress
- Years active: 2011-present
- Known for: FU: Friendship Unlimited

Sanskruti Sanjay Balgude (born 19 December 1992) is an Indian actress who appears in the Marathi language entertainment industry. Balgude is best known for her film Sarva Line Vyasta Ahet. She made her debut in the Marathi TV show Pinjara (2011) which aired on Zee Marathi.

== Personal life ==
Sanskruti Balgude was born on 19 December 1992 in Pune, Maharashtra. Her father name is Sanjay Balgude and mother name is Sanjivani Balgude.

== Filmography ==
Key
†	Denotes films that have not yet been released

=== Film ===
Year	Title	Role	Reference(s)
2014	Makadacha Lagin	Gauri	
2014	Sanngto Aika	Mohini	
2015	Shortcut	Ishika	
2015	Shinma		
2016	Nivdung	Sugandha	
2016	Damlelya Babanchi Kahani	Gajanan's daughter	
2017	FU: Friendship Unlimited	Tara	
2017	Ti Dete To Deto Saglech Detat Shivya	Sharwari	
2018	Lagna Mubarak	Idha	
2018	Re Raya	Manya's girlfriend	
2018	Take Care Good Night	Paurnima	
2018	Bhay	Taniya Aapte	
2019	Sarva Line Vyasta Aahet	Tanvi	
2021	Jine	Sarah	
2021	8 Don 75	Kavita	
2022	Dil Dimaag Aur Batti	Jyoti	
2023	Chowk	Kat	
2026	Deool Band 2	Rupali	

=== Television ===
Year	Title	Role	Ref(s)
2011–2012	Pinjara	Anandi	
2013–2014	Vivah Bandhan	Mukta	
2018	Chala Hawa Yeu Dya	Herself (guest)	
2019	Kaale Dhande	Kimaya	OTT released
2021	Me Honar Superstar - Jallosh Dancecha	Host	
