= Snehal Tarde =

Indian actress (born 1985)

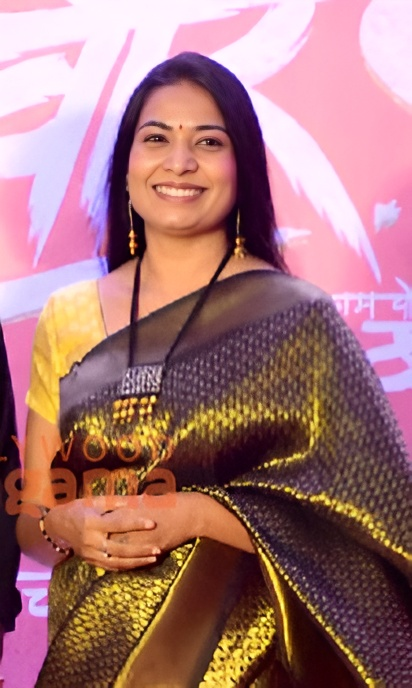
- Born: Snehal Ghayal; 13 November 1985 (age 40); Pune, Maharashtra
- Occupations: Actress; director; lyricist
- Years active: 2007-present
- Spouse: Pravin Tarde (m. 2009)
- Children: 1

Snehal Tarde (born 13 November 1985) is an Indian actress who appears in the Marathi cinema. Tarde is best known for her film Deool Band 2. She made her debut with TV series Abhimaan in 2007.

== Early life ==
Snehal was born on 28 December 1985 in Pune, Maharashtra. She completed a degree in Bachelor of Laws (LL.B.) before pursuing a career in the Marathi cinema.

== Career ==
Snehal began her acting career in 2007 with the Marathi television series Abhimaan on DD Sahyadri, in which she played the lead role of Iccha. She subsequently appeared in several Marathi stage productions and established herself in theatre before moving to films.

Tarde made her Marathi film debut with Chintoo (2012), portraying the mother of the character Raju. She reprised the role in Chintoo 2: Khajinyachi Chittarkatha (2013). In 2015, she appeared as Shanta in Deool Band, followed by a supporting role in Ventilator (2016). After a brief break from films, Tarde returned in 2022 with roles in Dharmaveer, where she portrayed Anita Birje, and the historical film Sarsenapati Hambirrao, in which she played Laxmibai Mohite. She later appeared as Mona in Chowk (2023).

In 2024, Tarde made her directorial debut with Phullwanti, in which she also portrayed Laxmi Venkat Shastri. In 2026, she played a lead role in Deool Band 2, which emerged as second highest-grossing Marathi films of the year.

== Personal life ==
Snehal met actor, writer and filmmaker Pravin Tarde in 2004 while working on a one-act play. Their professional association later developed into a relationship. Their families initially expressed reservations about the relationship because of the age difference between the couple, but subsequently gave their approval.

Snehal and Pravin Tarde married in 2009. The couple have a son, Parardh, who was born in 2011.

== Filmography ==
Year	Film	Role	Notes
2011	Shala	Akka	
2012	Chintoo	Raju's mother	
2013	Chintoo 2: Khajinyachi Chittarkatha	Raju's mother	
2015	Deool Band	Shanta	
2016	Ventilator		
2022	Dharmaveer	Anita Birje	
2022	Sarsenapati Hambirrao	Laxmi Mohite	
2023	Chowk	Mona	
2024	Dharmaveer 2	Anita Birje	
2024	Phullwanti	Laxmi Venkat Shastri	Also director
2026	Deool Band 2	Sangeeta Paygude	Also lyricist
