= Sanjeev Pandey =

Indian actor

- Born: 22 April 1974 (age 52)
- Occupations: Film actor Founder: Gluon Electrical
- Years active: 2013–present

Sanjeev Pandey (born 22 April 1974) is an Indian actor who appears in TV serials like Porus and Sasural Simar Ka. Pandey played the role of Sujoy in Abhishek Bachchan's The Big Bull.

== Television ==
Year	Title	Role	Channel
2013	Savdhaan India	Inspector Ateeq Ansari	Life OK
2015	Crime Patrol	Inspector	Sony TV
2016	Waaris (2016 TV series)	Inspector	&TV
2018	Mega Icons	A. P. J. Abdul Kalam	National Geographic (Indian TV channel)
2018	Sasural Simar Ka	Sarpanch	&TV
2018	Porus (TV series)	King Bessus	Star Plus
2019	Vighnaharta Ganesha	Rishi Janmdagni	Sony TV
2019	Yeh Hai Mohabbatein	Mr. Roy	Star Plus
2019	CID	Dr. Vikrant	Sony TV
2019	Manmohini	Mahapandit	Zee TV
2019	Ram Siya Ke Luv Kush	Augustya Rishi	Colors TV

== Filmography ==
Key
†	Denotes films that have not yet been released

Year	Film	Role	Notes
2019	Scotland	-	Nominated at Oscars
2021	The Big Bull	-	on Disney+ Hotstar
2022	Goodbye	-	Releasing on October 7, 2022

== Web-Series ==
Year	Web-Series	Role	Notes
2020	Shrikant Bashir	Manjit Saxena	Released on SonyLIV
2018 - 2020	Mega Icons	Dr APJ Abdul Kalam	Released on National Geographic Channel
