= Gashmeer Mahajani =

Indian film actor, choreographer, and play director

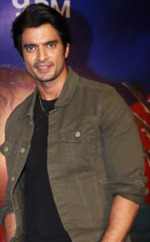
- Mahajani in 2023
- Born: 8 June 1985 (age 41); Pune, Maharashtra, India
- Occupations: Actor; dancer; play director
- Years active: 2010–present
- Spouse: Gauri Deshmukh (m. 2014)
- Children: 1
- Father: Ravindra Mahajani

Gashmeer Mahajani (born 8 June 1985) is an Indian actor who works in films, theatre and television. He is best known for his work in Marathi cinema and Hindi television. He is the son of actor Ravindra Mahajani who worked in Marathi films. In 2024, he participated in Khatron Ke Khiladi 14.

Gashmeer made his silver screen debut with P. Som Shekar's Hindi film Muskurake Dekh Zara (2010), although only in 2015 did he achieve popularity, when Carry On Maratha, which was his Marathi film debut and Deool Band were released and also won him a Filmfare Award Marathi for Best Male Debut

== Personal life ==
He is the son of renowned and veteran Marathi actor Ravindra Mahajani. He married Gauri Deshmukh on 28 December 2014. On 21 December 2019, the couple had their first child, a boy, Vyom. His father died in 2023.

== Media image ==
Most Desirable Men of Maharashtra
Sponsor	Year	Rank	
Sponsor	Year	Film	Ref.
The Times of India, Maharashtra Times	2017	5	
The Times of India, Maharashtra Times	2018	9	
The Times of India, Maharashtra Times	2019	2	
The Times of India, Maharashtra Times	2020	7	

== Career ==
In 2010, Mahajani made his screen debut with a Bollywood film named Muskurake Dekh Zara as Vivek. This film was commercially unsuccessful. Gashmeer next joined Mumbai's Prithvi Theatre, wherein he enacted various roles and directed. In 2015, Gashmeer debuted in the Regional Marathi Film Industry with his popular Marathi debut film Carry On Maratha as Maartand opposite actress Kashmira Kulkarni. In the same year, he also starred in another Marathi film Deool Band, where he portrayed the role of Dr. Raghav Shastri. This film saw some success globally. In 2016, he played Raghu in Kanha and Aditya Rane in One Way Ticket. He also starred in another Bollywood film Dongri Ka Raja as Raja.

In 2017, he was seen as Ajay in Mala Kahich Problem Nahi. In 2018, he did a crime horror show named Anjaan: Special Crimes Unit, an Indian paranormal investigative series, which aired on Discovery Jeet. In 2019, he played Sardar Jankoji Shinde in historical Panipat. In 2020, he portrayed Aditya Deodhar in Bonus. Later he made his web debut with SonyLIV's Shrikant Bashir, an action drama series. From 2020 to 2022, Mahajani was seen in Imlie as Aditya Kumar Tripathi, one of his famous roles, opposite Sumbul Touqeer and Mayuri Deshmukh. In 2022, he was seen in and as Vishu alongside Mrinmayee Godbole. Next, he was seen in Sarsenapati Hambirrao where he portrayed double roles, Shivaji and Sambhaji. He was also seen as a contestant in a dance-based reality show Jhalak Dikhhla Jaa 10, where he finished at 4th place. He was a judge in Zee Marathi's Dance Maharashtra Dance L'il Masters.

In 2023, he was seen in Colors TV’s serial Tere Ishq Mein Ghayal as Armaan Oberoi. In 2024 He was seen in Based on Babasaheb Purandare's Marathi novel Phulwanti, the film is set in the Peshwa era and narrates the story of the dancer Phullwanti and the renowned Peshwa Pandit scholar Venkat Shastri Played by Mahajani. In 2025 Started with his Delayed released Marathi movie Ek Radha Ek Meera and His long return to Hindi Cinema With Chhorii 2 a horror film directed by Vishal Furia and produced by Bhushan Kumar, Krishan Kumar, Vikram Malhotra and Jack Davis. A sequel to Chhorii (2021). In January 2026, he playing Aditya Sahu in Zee TV's Lakshmi Niwas.

== Filmography ==
=== Films ===
Year	Title	Role	Notes	Ref.
2010	Muskurake Dekh Zara	Vivek		
2015	Carry On Maratha	Martand	Marathi Cinema debut	
2015	Deool Band	Dr. Raghav Shastri	Filmfare Award Marathi Best Male Debut	
2016	Kanha	Raghu		
2016	One Way Ticket	Aditya Rane		
2016	Dongri Ka Raja	Raja		
2017	Mala Kahich Problem Nahi	Ajay		
2019	Panipat	Jankoji Shinde	depicts the events that took place during the Third Battle of Panipat	
2020	Bonus	Aditya Deodhar	Also choreographer	
2022	Vishu	Vishu	Also choreographer	
2022	Dharmaveer	Sameer	Extended cameo	
2022	Sarsenapati Hambirrao	Shivaji I / Sambhaji	*Also choreographer: Nominated Zee Chitra Gaurav Puraskar for Best Supporting Actor; Nominated Best Actor in a Supporting Role; Nominated Filmfare Award for Best Supporting Actor – Marathi	
2024	Phullwanti	Venkatadhwari Narasimha Shastri	* Based on Babasaheb Purandare's Marathi novel Phulwanti: Nominated Filmfare Award for Best Actor – Marathi; Winner -Best Actor - NDTV Awards; Nominated Zee Chitra Gaurav Puraskar for Best Actor; Nominated City Cine Awards for best actor; Winner - Sanskruti kala Darpan Awards for best actor	
2025	Ek Radha Ek Meera	Krushna		
2025	SuSheela SuJeet	Shana Kawala	Guest Appearance in a promotional song "Chiu Tai Dar Ughad"	
2025	Chhorii 2	Inspector Samar	first commercial Hindi movie as a male lead	
2026	Salbardi	Gondhali	Cameo appearance	
2026	Deool Band 2	Dr. Raghav Shastri	Cameo appearance	

=== Television ===
Year	Title	Role	Notes	Ref.
2018–2019	Prema Tujha Rang Kasa	Host	Season 1-2	
2018	Anjaan: Special Crimes Unit	ACP Vikrant Singhal		
2020–2022	Imlie	Aditya "Adi" Kumar Tripathi		
2022	Jhalak Dikhhla Jaa 10	Contestant	4th place	
2022	Saavi Ki Savaari	Himself	Guest	
2022	Dance Maharashtra Dance L'il Masters	Judge		
2023	Bigg Boss 16	Himself	Guest	
2023	Tere Ishq Mein Ghayal	Armaan Oberoi		
2024	Fear Factor: Khatron Ke Khiladi 14	Contestant	2nd runner-up	
2026–present	Lakshmi Niwas	Aditya Sahu		
2026	108 Base Hospital – Uri	Dr. Major Aniruddh Jaiswal		

=== Web series ===
Year	Title	Role	Ref.
2020	Shrikant Bashir	S.O.T. Chief Shrikant Mhatre	
2022–2023	Tu Zakhm Hai	Viraj Trehan	
2024	Gunaah	Abhimanyu Nayak	

=== Awards and nominations ===
Year	Awards	Film	Category	Result	Ref.
2015	Filmfare Awards Marathi	Deool Band	Filmfare Award for Best Male Debut – Marathi	Won	
2015	Maharashtra State Film Awards	Carry On Maratha	Best Debut Actor	Won	
2019	Filmfare Awards Marathi	Bonus	Filmfare Award for Best Actor – Marathi	Nominated	
2025	Suvarnaratna Awards		Acting	Won	
