= Chowk (film) =

2023 Indian Marathi-language film directed by Devendra Gaikwad

- Theatrical release poster
- Directed by: Devendra Gaikwad
- Written by: Devendra Gaikwad
- Screenplay by: Devendra Gaikwad
- Story by: Devendra Arun Gaikwad
- Produced by: Vishal Chandane; Dilip Lalasaheb Patil
- Starring: Kiran Gaikwad; Sanskruti Balgude; Pravin Tarde; Snehal Tarde; Akshay Tanksale; Upendra Limaye; Suresh Vishwakarma; Ramesh Pardeshi
- Cinematography: Mayur Hardas
- Edited by: Mayur Hardas
- Music by: Score: Omkar Dhotre; Songs: Sai-Piyush; Omkar Swarup Bagade
- Production company: Anuradha Films Pvt.Ltd
- Distributed by: Zee Studios
- Release date: 2 June 2023
- Running time: 133 minutes
- Country: India
- Language: Marathi
- Box office: ₹4.55 crore

Chowk is a 2023 Indian Marathi-language crime drama film directed by Devendra Gaikwad in his directorial debut and produced by Dilip Lalasaheb Patil under the banner of Anuradha Films. It stars Pravin Tarde, Sanskruti Balgude, Kiran Gaikwad, Upendra Limaye, Akshay Tanksale, Aritra Devendra Gaikwad, Snehal Tarde, Suresh Vishwakarma and Ramesh Pardeshi. It was theatrically released on 2 June 2023.

== Plot ==
A Chowk is like a solid witness that passively observes people, relationships, friendships, festivities, politics, and social interactions. Chowk is about crossroads.

== Cast ==
- Sanskruti Balgude as Kat
- Snehal Tarde as Mona
- Ramesh Pardeshi as Police Inspector Mule
- Akshay Tanksale as Balya
- Devendra Gaikwad as Ex
- Kiran Gaikwad as Sunny Shinde
- Upendra Limaye as Tiger
- Pravin Tarde as Anna
- Ahaveer Hore
- Sagar Pable as Kat's brother
- Aritra Devendra Gaikwad
- Anjali Joglekar as Sunny's mother
- Sunil Abhyankar as Sunny's father
- Shashikant Padwal
- Sandeep Juwatkar as Naresh Chavan
- Shubhankar Ekbote as Adhyaksha
- Dipti Joshi
- Dilip Lalasaheb Patil
- Suresh Vishwakarma as Jailor
- Mahesh Hagawane

== Release ==
=== Theatrical ===
The film was set to be released on 12 May 2023. Due to unknown reasons, the release date was postponed & its release was delayed to 2 June.

== Reception ==
=== Box office ===
Chowk released on approximately 300 screens in India, collected ₹3.5 million on opening day. The film grossed over ₹47.0 million at the box office and became eleventh highest grossing Marathi film of 2023, it is declared semi-hit at box office.

== Music ==
The music of the film is composed by the duo Sai-Piyush and Omkar Swarup Bagade, while background score is composed by Omkar Dhotre.

Track listing
No.	Title	Lyrics	Singer(s)	Length
1.	"Jaal Jaal Zala Re"	Omkar Swaroop	Nagesh Morvekar, Dr Vinaya	4:00
2.	"Dolaychya Dohat"	Suhas Yadav, Vaishali Mhade	Omkar Swaroop	3:43
Total length:				7:43
