= Preetam (film) =

- Theatrical release poster
- Directed by: Sijo Rocky
- Produced by: Faizal Nithin Sijo
- Starring: Pranav Raorane; Nakshatra Medhekar; Upendra Limaye
- Cinematography: Om Narayan
- Edited by: Jayant Jathar
- Music by: Viswajith C T
- Release date: 19 February 2021
- Country: India
- Language: Marathi

Preetam is a 2021 Indian Marathi-language directed by Sijo Rocky. Pranav Raorane and Nakshatra Medhekar in lead role, story of the film is written by Sujit kurup and produce by Faizal Nithin Sijo. It was theatrically released on 19 February 2021.

== Synopsis ==
A milkman struggles with an inferiority complex because of his skin colour. However, everything may change after love knocks at the doors of his heart.

== Cast ==
- Pranav Raorane as Preetam
- Nakshatra Medhekar as Suvarna
- Upendra Limaye
- Ajit Devle
- Sameer Khandekar
- Abha Velankar
- Nayan Jadhav
- Shivraj Walvekar
- Vishwajeet Sunil Palav

== Production ==
In October 2018, Sijo Rocky announced a debut film titled Preetam. On 26 March 2019, principal photography took place in Kokan, Maharashtra Filming was completed on 11 February 2021.

== Reception ==
Mihir Bhanage from The Times of India wrote "While Preetam is still a decent watch, it could've been better with some crisp editing and direction. In the present form, it's not entirely fascinating, but not bad either". Jaideep Pathakji from Maharashtra Times says "In short, Pritam is a love story in a dream. There's a lot that's special about it". Viplav Gupte of News18 India wrote "If edited properly then this film can be more entertaining. Anyway, take a look. This is the story of a town in Konkan. You will like it. Language is not that big a barrier because all are sub title".
