= Chintoo =

Comic strip

- Pappu (left), Chintoo (middle), Mini (right)
- Author(s): Charuhas Pandit and Prabhakar Wadekar
- Website: www.chintoo.com
- Current status/schedule: Running
- Launch date: 21 November 1991
- Genre(s): Humour

Chintoo is a famous Marathi comic strip that appears in Sakal newspaper. Chintoo is written by Charuhas Pandit and Prabhakar Wadekar. For a couple of years, it appeared in Loksatta. Chintoo (sometimes incorrectly spelled as Chintu) has been popular in all age groups since it started. It was first published on 21 November 1991.

== Theme ==
Chintoo, the hero of the strip, represents a typical boy in middle class Marathi family. Normal incidents in his day-to-day life are given a humorous face in this cartoon series. He faces all the problems that other boys of his age face like pressure to study from parents, getting bullied, etc. He also enjoys doing pranks. He gets fun out of simple things. He enjoys watching cricket and stealing mangoes from Joshi Kaku's trees. He loves to have pets, but his parents always refuse to let him have one.

== Characters in the cartoon ==
Pappa

Chintoo's father. He is an engineer by profession.

Aai

Chintoo's mother is a housewife. Her name is Deepa.

Ajji

Chintoo's grandmother is very loving and caring.

Ajoba

Chintoo's grandfather. Chintoo goes to his grandfather whenever he needs a toy who always fulfills Chintoo's demands.

Pappu

Chintoo's best friend. The boy who helps Chintoo when he is in danger. But then, Raju is a bigger danger than anybody can handle. Pappu is an animal lover and he especially likes puppies. He is very naughty as well.

Mini

A girl in the group. She loves going to school, exams, and everything about studies. She is a poet at heart but nobody in the group likes her poems. Chintoo dislikes everything that Mini likes. Chintoo quarrels with Mini all the time.

Bagalya

A geek in the group. His name derives from his lanky frame, much like a stork. Baglya is kind of average Joe.

Raju

The bodily strong but mentally slow person in the group. Likes Mini's poems, but then that is not a praise. He does not understand jokes quickly, even if you make fun of him. So, if you are fast, you can crack jokes about him and get away. If he catches you, you are beaten. Chintoo loves making fun of Raju and keeps getting beaten by Raju.

Joshi Kaku

Chintoo's neighbor, who has a large garden full of fruit trees. Gets the brunt of the group's play, with their cricket resulting mostly in ball going through Joshikaku's glass windows, with predictable results.she loves Chintoo but she doesn't show that.

Joshi Kaka

Joshi Kaku's husband. Appears very rarely in the scene

Sonu

The small child in the group. He always faces troubles and everyone tries to rescue him. He is a typical boy with a handkerchief tied to his shirt.

Banti

The doggy. He is Baglya's small brown-yellow colored pet dog. Chintoo always wants to have a dog in his house like Bunty.

Neha

Another girl in the group. Appears very rarely in the scene.

Satish Dada

Chintoo's neighbour. Very filmy college going guy.

== Android and iPhone Applications ==
Chintoo's Official mobile application has been released on Android and Apple app stores in April 2013. iPhone Application Link: Android Application Link:https://play.google.com/store/apps/details?id=com.Charuhas_Pandit.chintoo

== Books ==
Purandare Prakashan has published a total 30 books before Sakal Prakashan.

Series of books published by Sakal Prakashan, are a collection of the comic strips of Chintoo published in Sakal Newspaper. There are total 14 volumes published till date and 6 more to be launched in 2013.

== Film ==
On 18 May 2012, Indian Magic Eye Motion Pictures Pvt. Ltd. released the feature film version of the comic character and his gang. The film opened to a delightful response and was appreciated by a younger audience. The film, directed by Shrirang Godbole, has Shubhankar Atre playing the lead character of Chintoo. Actors like Subodh Bhave, Vibhawari Deshpande and others played the supporting characters. The film is the first Indian feature which has been adapted from a daily comic strip.

A sequel to the first film was released in 2013, titled Chintoo 2: Khajinyachi Chittarkatha. The film had all the children characters played by the same actors as in the first film.
