= Pranav Raorane =

India actor

- Occupation: Actor

Pranav Raorane is an Indian Marathi actor known for films such as Aatpadi Nights, Preetam and Piccolo.

== Filmography ==
| Year | Film | Role | Notes | Reference |
|---|---|---|---|---|
| 2013 | Duniyadari | Sunil Bhosle (a.k.a. Sorry) | | |
| 2019 | Aatpadi Nights | Vasant Khatmode | | |
| 2021 | Preetam | Preetam | | |
| 2023 | Piccolo | Victor | | |
| 2023 | Musandi | | | |
| 2023 | Aatur | Rane | | |
| 2025 | Mu. Po. Bombilwadi | Bhaskar | | |
