= Shrirang Godbole =

Marathi actor, producer and director

- Born: 15 June 1960 (age 66); Mumbai, Maharashtra, India
- Citizenship: Indian
- Education: Electrical Engineer
- Occupations: Theater, Film, TV Writer, Director, Producer, Actor, Lyricist and Event Designer
- Years active: 38
- Organization(s): Chairman of Indian Magic Eye Pvt.Ltd. Chairman of Censor Board, State Govt. of Maharashtra
- Notable work: Playwright, Director, Important component of Grips Theater Movement for Children in India, works with the National School of Drama's Theater in Education- Agartala Camp, Film writer and Director, Leading Producer of Marathi Television and Cinema, Lyricist for many film songs and TV title songs
- Awards: National Awards for film Tuhya Dharma Koncha, Maharashtra State Award for Best Writer, Director, Zee Talkies Comedy Award for Best Play, Zee Marathi Awards for Best lyricist, Ma Ta Sanman for Best Programming & TV Serials, Ma Ta Sanman Best Lyricist, MICTA Jury Award for Best Play and many more

Shrirang Godbole (born 15 June 1960) is a Marathi theatre, television and film writer, director, actor, and lyricist.

== Career ==
In 1979, he started his career as a stage actor when he joined Theatre Academy, Pune. He acted in Jabbar Patel's Ghashiram Kotwal, Padgham and Satish Alekar's Mahanirvan, Pralay, Bhint, Atireki. In 1986, he started writing his own plays. He started writing for Grips Theatre Movement in India. Godbole has directed many TV serials and films. Many events including Award Ceremonies, Sawai Gandharva Sangeet Mahotsav, The PIFF Bazar are coordinated by him. Recently he has started making content for education and his company, under his guidance, has developed a content making software- CDX (Content Delivery Express).

== Playwright ==
- Make Up (1986)
- Chhan Chhote Waitta Mothe (1986)
- Nako Re Baba (1989)
- Hach Khel Udya Punha (1990)
- Diwas Tuzey Hey (1993)
- Pahile Paan (1995)
- Pan Amhala Khelaychay (1997)
- Sangeet Namunyadakhal (1999)
- Eka Lagnachi Goshta (2005)
- Du & Me (2013)
- Der Gast is Gott (2014)
- "Y" (2017)
- Jamba Bamba Boo (2018)
- Idiots (2019)
- Perplex 1.0 (2021)

== TV serials ==
- Prarabdha (ETV Marathi 2001)
- Pimpalpaan (Alpha Marathi 2003)
- Ghadlay Bighadlay (Alpha Marathi 2003)
- Nakshatranche Dene (Alpha Marathi 2003)
- Agnihotra (Star Pravah 2008)
- Amarprem (Zee Marathi 2009)
- Guntata Hriday He (Zee Marathi 2011)
- Eka Lagnachi Dusri Goshta (Zee Marathi 2012)
- Shejari Shejari Pakke Shejari (Zee Marathi 2013)
- Eka Lagnachi Tisri Goshta (Zee Marathi 2013)
- Dhabal Ek Taas Timepass (Star Pravah 2014)
- Gunda Purush Dev (ETV Marathi 2013)
- Hamma Live (Colors Marathi 2014)
- Ithech Taka Tambu (Zee Yuva 2016)
- Chupke Chupke (&TV 2017)
- Ti Phularani (Sony Marathi 2018)
- Sindhu (Fakt Marathi 2019)
- Agnihotra 2 (Star Pravah 2019)
- 800 Khidkya 900 Dare (Sony Marathi 2020)
- Detective Dhananjay: Rahasyajaal (2026)

== Lyrics ==
=== TV Serial Title Songs ===
- Marathi Paaul Padte Pudhe Title song (Zee Marathi)
- Sa Re Ga Ma Pa Marathi Title song (Zee Marathi)
- Eka Peksha Ek Title song (Zee Marathi)
- Hasyasamrat Title song (Zee Marathi)
- Ghadlay Bighadlay Title song (Zee Marathi)
- Tujhyat Jeev Rangala Title song (Zee Marathi)
- Naktichya Lagnala Yaycha Ha Title song (Zee Marathi)
- Lakha Lakha Chanderi - Zee Talkies Title song (Marathi)
- Beej Jase Ankurate - Zee Gaurav Title song (Marathi)
- Agnihotra Title song (Star Pravah)
- Gunda Purush Dev (ETV Marathi)
- Kon Honar Crorepati (Sony Marathi Promo Song)
- Guntata Hriday He Title song (Zee Marathi)
- Lagnachi Wife Weddingchi Bayku (Zee Marathi)
- Home Minister (New) (Zee Marathi)
- Ti Phularani (Sony Marathi)
- Aggabai Sasubai Title song (Zee Marathi)
- Sindhu Title song (Fakt Marathi)
- Dev Pawala Title song (Fakt Marathi)
- Prem Poison Panga Title song (Zee Yuva)
- 800 Khidkya 900 Dara (Sony Marathi)
- Sahkutumb Sahparivar (Star Pravah)
- Sukh Mhanje Nakki Kay Asta! (Star Pravah)

=== Film Songs ===
- Astitva (Hindi)
- Kaksparsha (Hindi)
- Jabardast
- Vedya Mana
- Full 3 Dhamaal
- Aga Bai Arechyaa 2
- De Dhakka
- Sadhi Manasa
- Chashmebahaddar
- Mumbai-Pune-Mumbai
- Mumbai-Pune-Mumbai 2
- Me Shivajiraje Bhosale Boltoy
- Ti Saddhya Kay Karte
- Vitti Dandu
- F.U.
- Lokmanya Tilak
- Cycle
- Mazee Shala
- Aawhan
- Be Dune Sade Char
- Nau Mahine Nau Diwas
- Porbazar
- Superstar
- Dubhang
- Vees Mhanaje Vees
- Ubuntu
- Pitruroon
- Chintoo 2
- Baji
- Pune 52

== Dialogues ==
- Jis Desh Me Ganga Raheta Hai
- Baji (film)

== Film producer ==
- Pune 52
- Chintoo 1 (2012)
- Chintoo 2 Khajinyachi Chittarkatha (2013)
- Pitrurun
- Tuhya Dharma Koncha

== Executive producer ==
- Harischandrachi Factory

== Personal ==
Godbole's son Suhrud Godbole is married to the Marathi film and television actress Girija Oak. His daughter Mrinmayee Godbole is a film actress.
