= Urfi (film) =

2015 Marathi-language film

- Directed by: Vikram Pradhan
- Starring: Prathamesh Parab; Mitali Mayekar; Upendra Limaye
- Cinematography: Pradeep Khanvilkar
- Music by: Chinar–Mahesh
- Release date: 23 October 2015
- Country: India
- Language: Marathi

Urfi is an Indian Marathi language romantic thriller film directed by Vikram Pradhan. The film starring Prathamesh Parab, Mitali Mayekar and Upendra Limaye. Music by Chinar–Mahesh. The film was released on 23 October 2015.

== Synopsis ==
Deva who works for an estate agent falls in love with the daughter of one of his clients. As he tries to create a good impression on the family and woo the girl, he is unaware of an upcoming hurdle.

== Cast ==
- Prathamesh Parab as Deva
- Mitali Mayekar as Amruta
- Upendra Limaye
- Kavita Lad
- Milind Pathak

== Soundtrack ==
Urfi

Soundtrack album by Chinar–Mahesh
- Released: 2015
- Recorded: 2015
- Genre: Feature film soundtrack
- Length: 10:25
- Language: Marathi

Official audio
- Urfi – Full Album on YouTube

Track listing
No.	Title	Singer(s)	Length
1.	"Dhanak Dhanak"	Siddharth Mahadevan	3:44
2.	"Yaar Bas Tu"	Aanandi Joshi, Rishikesh Kamekar	2:57
3.	"O Maria"	Harshavardhan Wavare	4:24
Total length:			10:25

== Critical response ==
Urfi film received negative reviews from critics. Mihir Bhanage of The Times of India gave the film 2.5 stars out of 5 and wrote "There are inexplicable flaws in the narrative which can only be accepted if, to use a cliched phrase, you leave your brains at home". Dipak Damle of Loksatta wrote "The director has tried to give a twist to the plot. But he did not get that much success. The impossible love story is fast forwarded. But at the same time the seriousness is lost due to meaningless dialogues, jokes and scenes". Baban Bansidhar Lihinar of Maharashtra Times gave the film 2.5 stars out of 5 and wrote "As the unimaginable story unfolds, the breach of expectation falls. Something similar has happened in this movie".
