= Vibhavari Deshpande =

Indian film actress

Vibhawari Deshpande
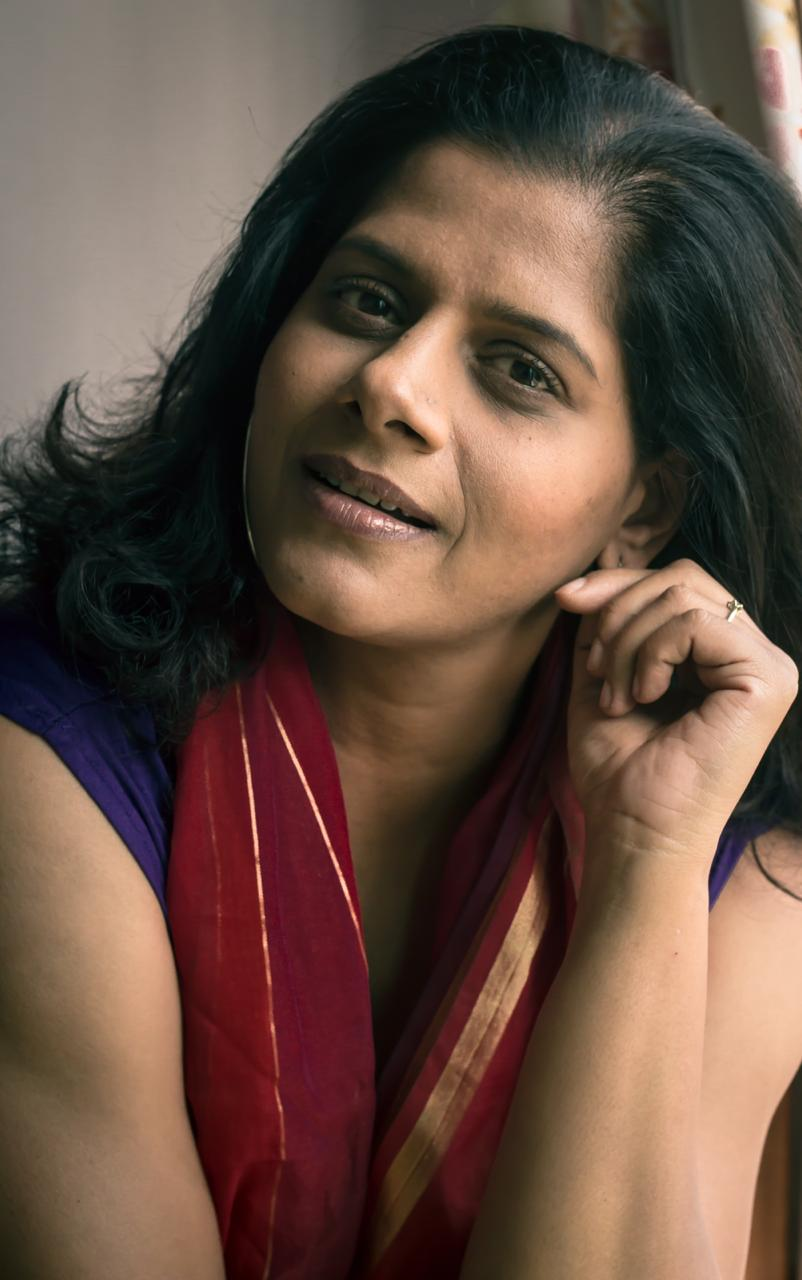
- Deshpande in 2019
- Born: Vibhawari Dixit; Pune, Maharashtra, India
- Occupations: Actress, writer
- Known for: Harishchandrachi Factory
- Spouse: Hrishikesh Deshpande (m. 2001)
- Children: 1

Vibhawari Deshpande is an Indian actress, writer and director who works in Marathi theatre and Marathi cinema.

== Career ==
=== Writer and director ===
Deshpande started her career with acting and off-screen works in college drama. She also attended various courses organised by National School of Drama, Delhi and workshops conducted by noted theatre personality Satyadev Dubey. While working for drama, she mainly worked off-screen in writing department. She has also written dialogues for the Marathi TV serial Agnihotra that aired on Star Pravaha.

Deshpande is active in theater with an Indo-German group "Grips" that produces plays for children. Along with acting and writing scripts, she has also directed a Kannada play Gumma Banda Gumma.

=== Acting ===
Deshpande received her first acting break for a cameo role as a receptionist in the multi-award-winning 2004 film Shwaas. Her next role came in Smita Talwalkar's production Saatchya Aat Gharat. Here she played the role of Ketaki, one of the seven college students around whom the story revolved. She also worked in one of the documentaries directed by Dr. Jabbar Patel.

She later on acted in a few Hindi films doing side roles. Her big break came in 2009 when she played the historical role of Saraswati Phalke, wife of the father of Indian cinema Dadasaheb Phalke, in the film Harishchandrachi Factory. Deshpande's role was of a supportive wife who helped her husband in his journey towards making India's first full-length feature film Raja Harishchandra. She also received the Best Actress award by MICTA for her role of Saraswati. In 2010, she played the role of Dwarka, wife of Guna, in the film Natarang. Based on the novel of same name by Anand Yadav, Dwarka's character was of a wife who dislikes her husband's involvement in Tamasha. In 2011, Deshpande portrayed another historic role of wife of one of the greatest Marathi singers and stage actors, Bal Gandharva. Her role in the film supported the lead title role of Bal Gandharva, who enacted female roles in theater when women did not act.

== Filmography ==
Films
| Year | Title | Role | Notes |
|---|---|---|---|
| 2004 | Shwaas | Receptionist | |
| 2004 | Saatchya Aat Gharat | Ketaki | |
| 2007 | Dum Kaata | Ananya's mother | Hindi film |
| 2008 | Mumbai Meri Jaan | Archana Kadam | Hindi film |
| 2009 | Harishchandrachi Factory | Saraswati Phalke, Dadasaheb Phalke's wife | |
| 2010 | Natarang | Dwaraka Kagalkar | |
| 2011 | Balgandharva | Laxmi, Balgandharva's wife | |
| 2011 | Deool | Poetya's sister-in-law | |
| 2012 | Chintoo | Chintoo's mother | |
| 2012 | Tuhya Dharma Koncha | Bhulabai | |
| 2013 | Postcard | Lisa Khamble | |
| 2017 | Tumhari Sulu | Constable | |
| 2017 | Tikli and Laxmi Bomb | Laxmi | |
| 2024 | Phullwanti | Avanti Devi | |

Web series
| Year | Title | Role |
|---|---|---|
| 2018 | Sacred Games | Gaitonde's Mother |
| 2019 | Mayanagari: City of Dreams | Purushottam's Wife |
| 2020 | Breathe: Into the Shadows | Prakash Kamble's college friend |
| 2020 | Criminal Justice: Behind Closed Doors | Mukta Tai |
| 2025 | Baai Tujhyapayi | Mangal Bai |
| 2026 | Daldal | Isabel Ferreira |

Plays
| Title | Language | Role | Ref. |
|---|---|---|---|
| MH-12 Mukkam Post Pune | Marathi | Actress | |
| Gumma Banda Gumma | Kannada | Director | |
| Gayab Geet | Marathi | Director | |

== Personal life ==
Born Vibhawari Dixit and brought up in Pune, Maharashtra, India, Deshpande did her schooling at Garware High School, Pune. She did her graduation from Fergusson College in Arts and Mass Communication. Her father, Upendra Dixit runs the book store International Book Service set up by her grandfather in Pune in 1931 and her mother Maneesha Dixit was a scholar, writer and theater critic. Her grandmother Muktabai Dixit was also a famous writer and playwright in Marathi.
