= Amruta Khanvilkar filmography =

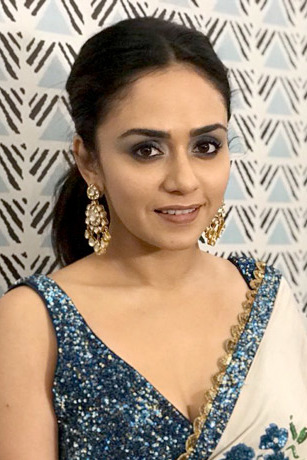
Khanvilkar in 2018

Indian actress Amruta Khanvilkar primarily appears in Marathi and Hindi films. She began her career in 2004 as a contestant on the reality show India's Best Cinestars Ki Khoj and made her acting debut that same year in the FTII short film Saanjh. Khanvilkar made her film debut by playing the dual role in the Marathi-language film Golmaal (2006). The following year, she made her Bollywood debut with the drama Mumbai Salsa (2007), which had an average box office performance, but she gained major success with Ram Gopal Varma's supernatural horror film Phoonk. The comedy Saade Maade Teen (2007) and the big-budget thriller Gaiir (2009) were both huge commercial successes, with the former becoming one of the highest-grossing Marathi films of its time.

Khanvilkar received widespread attention for the song "Wajle Ki Bara" from the film Natarang (2010), due to the popularity of the song she performed at more than ten thousand events. In 2011, she featured as a teacher in the successful romantic drama Shala, portrayed a supportive girlfriend in the hit film Arjun and received critical acclaim for her role as a rural girl in the blockbuster romantic comedy Zhakaas, which also won her the MFK Award for Favourite Actress. In the following years, Khanvilkar played a dance therapist in the acclaimed drama Aayna Ka Bayna, a fearless girl in superhero drama Baji, a depressed girl in romantic drama Welcome Zindagi, and a Muslim artist in the musical Katyar Kaljat Ghusali, all of which were commercial successes. The latter most received her nominations at the Maharashtra State Film Awards and the Filmfare Awards Marathi. However, her subsequent films, One Way Ticket (2016) and Bus Stop (2017), received poor reviews. Khanvilkar subsequently returned to Hindi films after eight years in 2018 with Meghna Gulzar's thriller Raazi and Milap Zaveri's action thriller Satyameva Jayate, while her portrayal as Lady Serial Killer Lovina Birdie in the thriller web series Damaged was highly praised by critics and audiences. Following this, she made her television debut in a lead role on Star Pravah's Jeevlaga, alongside Swapnil Joshi and Siddharth Chandekar, along with two film releases.

She had three notable releases in 2022, a downtrodden girl in Sachin Kundalkar's love drama Pondicherry, a strong-headed homemaker of Maratha army general in Abhijit Deshpande's pan-India historical film Har Har Mahadev, and Chandramukhi, in which she starred as the titular Tamasha performer; all three marked critical and commercial success. Continuing to take on diverse roles across films and web series, Khanvilkar had four web series released in 2024, including the cybercrime thriller Video Cam Scam, a Disney+ Hotstar action drama Lootere and an intense crime thriller 36 Days earned critical acclaim, and also appeared in Like Aani Subscribe, exploring social media issues, and portrayed Maharani Yesubai in the historical epic Dharmarakshak Mahaveer Chhatrapati Sambhaji Maharaj, which became a major box-office success.

She has also produced and starred in the music videos Akkal Yeu De (2022) and Ganaraj Gajanan (2023) under her label Amrit Kala Studios. In 2024, she launched her live theatrical dance production World of Stree in association with the UN-accredited NGO 'earth', blending classical and semi-classical music and dance to explore themes central to womanhood.

== Films ==
Key
| † | Denotes films that have not yet been released |

| Year | Title | Role | Language | Notes | Ref. |
|---|---|---|---|---|---|
| 2004 | Saanjh | Deepa | Hindi | Short film | |
| 2006 | Golmaal | Purva / Apurva (Note: Khanvilkar played dual roles in the film.) | Marathi | | |
| 2007 | Hattrick | Hemendra Patel's daughter | Hindi | | |
| 2007 | Mumbai Salsa | Neha | Hindi | credited as Amruta | |
| 2007 | Saade Maade Teen | Madhura | Marathi | | |
| 2008 | Contract | Divya | Hindi | | |
| 2008 | Phoonk | Aarti | Hindi | | |
| 2008 | Doghat Tisra Aata Sagala Visara | - | Marathi | Cameo appearance in the song "Rang Barse" | |
| 2009 | Gaiir | Neha | Marathi | | |
| 2010 | Natarang | - | Marathi | Cameo appearance in the song "Wajle Ki Bara" | |
| 2010 | Phoonk 2 | Aarti | Hindi | | |
| 2010 | Phillum City | Malti | Hindi | Unreleased | |
| 2011 | Shala | Paranajpe Bai | Marathi | | |
| 2011 | Fakta Ladh Mhana | - | Marathi | Cameo appearance in the song "Daav Ishqacha" | |
| 2011 | Arjun | Anushka (Anu) | Marathi | | |
| 2011 | Zhakaas | Manjula | Marathi | | |
| 2011 | Dhoosar | Carla | Marathi | | |
| 2012 | Satrangi Re | RJ Alisha | Marathi | | |
| 2012 | Aayna Ka Bayna | Shivani | Marathi | | |
| 2013 | Himmatwala | - | Hindi | Cameo appearance in the song "Dhoka Dhoka" | |
| 2013 | Vanshvel | Herself | Marathi | Cameo appearance in the song "Ambe Krupa Kari" | |
| 2014 | LBW (Love Before Wedding) | - | Marathi | Shelved film | |
| 2015 | Baji | Gauri | Marathi | | |
| 2015 | Ek Doosrey Ke Liye | - | Marathi | Shelved film | |
| 2015 | Welcome Zindagi | Meera | Marathi | | |
| 2015 | Katyar Kaljat Ghusali | Zareena | Marathi | | |
| 2015 | Aawhan | Neha | Marathi | | |
| 2016 | One Way Ticket | Shivani | Marathi | | |
| 2017 | Rangoon | Maharani | Hindi | | |
| 2017 | Baaki Itihaas | Vasanthi | Hindi | Cineplay | |
| 2017 | Bus Stop | Sharayu | Marathi | | |
| 2018 | Raazi | Munira | Hindi | | |
| 2018 | Satyameva Jayate | Sarita Rathod | Hindi | | |
| 2018 | Ani...Dr. Kashinath Ghanekar | Chandrakala (Sandhya Shantaram) | Marathi | | |
| 2019 | Rampaat | Herself | Marathi | Cameo appearance in the song "Aaichaan Ra" | |
| 2020 | Choricha Mamla | Shraddha | Marathi | | |
| 2020 | Malang | Teresa Rodrigues | Hindi | | |
| 2021 | Well Done Baby | Meera | Marathi | | |
| 2021 | Deja Vu | Voice | Hindi | | |
| 2022 | Pondicherry | Manasi | Marathi | | |
| 2022 | Chandramukhi | Chandramukhi (Chandra) Umajirao Jhunarkar | Marathi | | |
| 2022 | Har Har Mahadev | Sonabai Deshpande | Marathi | | |
| 2023 | Autograph | Julia | Marathi | | |
| 2024 | Like Aani Subscribe | Deepika | Marathi | | |
| 2024 | Dharmarakshak Mahaveer Chhatrapati Sambhaji Maharaj | Maharani Yesubai Bhonsale | Marathi | | |
| 2025 | Sangeet Manapmaan | Herself | Marathi | Cameo appearance in the song "Vandan Ho" | |
| 2025 | SuSheela SuJeet | Aarti / Chiu Tai | Marathi | Cameo appearance | |
| 2025 | 08:08 | - | English | Short film | |
| 2025 | 08:08 | - | Hindi | Short film | |
| 2025 | Fragile | Aruna | Hindi | Short film | |
| 2025 | The Taj Story | Harsha Patel | Hindi | | |
| 2026 | Tu Yaa Main | Sulochana | Hindi | Cameo appearance | |

== Television ==
Key
| † | Denotes television productions that have not yet been released |

| Year | Title | Role | Language | Notes | Ref. |
|---|---|---|---|---|---|
| 2004 | India's Best Cinestars Ki Khoj | Contestant | Hindi | 3rd place | |
| 2005 | A.D.A | Swati | Hindi | | |
| 2005 | Time Bomb 9/11 | Anu | Hindi | | |
| 2007 | Eka Peksha Ek | Contestant | Marathi | 1st runner-Up | |
| 2008-2009 | Comedy Express | Host | Marathi | | |
| 2009–2010 | Maharashtracha Superstar – Season 1 | Host | Marathi | | |
| 2012 | Dance Maharashtra Dance – Season 1 | Host | Marathi | | |
| 2013 | Maharashtracha Dancing Superstar | Judge | Marathi | | |
| 2015 | Nach Baliye 7 | Contestant | Hindi | Winner | |
| 2016 | 24 | Antara Mane-Shinde | Hindi | Season 2 | |
| 2017 | 2 MAD | Judge | Marathi | | |
| 2017 | Dance India Dance 6 | Host | Hindi | | |
| 2018 | Super Dancer Maharashtra | Judge | Marathi | | |
| 2019 | Jeevlaga | Kavya | Marathi | | |
| 2020 | Fear Factor: Khatron Ke Khiladi 10 | Contestant | Hindi | 8th place | |
| 2022 | Jhalak Dikhhla Jaa 10 | Contestant | Hindi | 9th place | |
| 2024 | Drama Juniors | Judge | Marathi | | |

== Web series ==
| Year | Title | Role | Platform | Language | Notes | Ref. |
|---|---|---|---|---|---|---|
| 2018 | Damaged | Lovina Birdie | Hungama Play | Hindi | Season 1 | |
| 2019 | Famously Filmfare Marathi | Host | MX Player | Marathi | | |
| 2023 | Ticket to Maharashtra with Amruta Khanvilkar | Herself | YouTube | Hindi | | |
| 2024 | Video Cam Scam | Priya Vinay Kumar | Epic On | Hindi | | |
| 2024 | Lootere | Avika Gandhi | Disney+ Hotstar | Hindi | | |
| 2024 | Chacha Vidhayak Hain Humare | Surekha Ji | MX Player | Hindi | Season 3 | |
| 2024 | 36 Days | Lalita Shinde | SonyLIV | Hindi | | |
| 2026 | Taskaree | Mitali Kamath | Netflix | Hindi | | |
| 2026 | Space Gen: Chandrayaan | Madhvi Verma | Disney+ Hotstar | Hindi | | |

== Music videos ==
| Year | Title | Singer | Language | Notes | Ref. |
|---|---|---|---|---|---|
| 2009 | Aye Hip Hopper | Ishq Bector | Hindi | | |
| 2013 | Aao Morey Piya | Abhijeet Sawant | Hindi | from album "Farida" | |
| 2022 | Akkal Yeu De | Abhanga Repost | Marathi | Also producer | |
| 2023 | Ganaraj Gajanan | Rahul Deshpande | Marathi | Also producer | |
| 2026 | Tu Ga Mohini | Abhay Jodhpurkar | Marathi | Also producer | |

== Theatre ==
| Year | Title | Role | Notes | Ref. |
|---|---|---|---|---|
| 2024 | World of Stree | Herself | Also producer | |
| 2025 | Sundari | Herself | | |
| 2026 | Lagna Panchami | Suryaja | Acting debut; also producer | |
