= List of awards and nominations received by Amruta Khanvilkar =

Amruta Khanvilkar awards and nominations
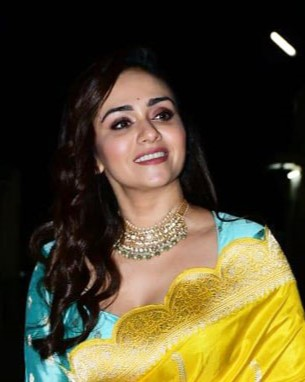
- Khanvilkar in 2022
Awards and nominations
Award	Wins	Nominations
Fakt Marathi Cine Sanman	1	2
Filmfare Awards Marathi	0	3
Maharashtra State Film Awards	1	2
Maharashtracha Favourite Kon?	3	16
Stardust Awards	0	1
Zee Chitra Gaurav Puraskar	1	4

Totals (Note: Certain award groups do not simply award one winner. They acknowledge several different recipients, have runners-up, and have third place. Since this is a specific recognition and is different from losing an award, runner-up mentions are considered wins in this award tally. For simplification and to avoid errors, each award in this list has been presumed to have had a prior nomination.)
- Wins: 22
- Nominations: 44

Amruta Khanvilkar is an Indian actress and producer who appears primarily in Marathi and Hindi films. She has established herself as one of the most popular celebrities in Maharashtra and also one of the highest-paid actors in the Marathi industry. Khanvilkar is also widely known for her dancing, and has appeared in more than 30 films, and has won several accolades, including three Maharashtracha Favourite Kon, one Maharashtra State Film Award, and three Filmfare Awards Marathi nominations.

She made her film debut in the Marathi romantic comedy Golmaal (2006). The following year, she made her Hindi film debut with Mumbai Salsa. Though the film was average commercially, Khanvilkar continued in films and attained commercial success with Saade Maade Teen and Phoonk. The Latter earned her an Exciting New Face nomination at the Stardust Awards. She starred in a string of commercial successes and portrayed a variety of characters—a NRI girl in Gaiir (2009), a strong-encouraging girlfriend in Arjun (2011), and a dashing village girl in Zhakaas (2011)—all of them earning her nominations at the MFK Awards and winning her trophy for Zhakaas. In 2013, she won the Best Actress award at the CineRockom International Film Festival for Aayna Ka Bayna. She played a Muslim artist in the epic musical drama Katyar Kaljat Ghusali, for which she received various nominations, including the 53rd Maharashtra State Film Awards, the 2nd Filmfare Awards Marathi, and the Maharashtracha Favourite Kon in the Supporting Actress category. For portraying a lady serial killer in the crime thriller Damaged, Amruta won a ScreenXX Summit & Awards and IWMBuzz Digital Awards in the Negative Performer category. She won the Zee Talkies Comedy Awards for Best Actress for Choricha Mamla (2020).

In 2022, Khanvilkar portrayed the tamasha dancer in the romantic drama Chandramukhi, which won her numerous awards, including the second MFK Award for Favourite Actress, the Fakt Marathi Cine Sanman, and earned nominations at the Filmfare Award, Zee Chitra Gaurav Puraskar and MaTa Sanman. Also that year, she received nominations at the Filmfare Award for Best Supporting Actress and Pravah Picture Awards for the drama film Pondicherry and the MFK Award for Favourite Supporting Actress for the historical action film Har Har Mahadev.

In addition to acting, Khanvilkar received an award for Lokmat Maharashtra's Most Stylish in 2017. She has also received the Majha Sanman Puraskar for her contribution to the arts, the Lokmat Stylish Awards for her contribution to regional cinema, and the Pune Times Mirror Hall of Fame Award for her contribution in the field of cinema and entertainment. In 2025, she was honored with the Pune Festival Award for Lifetime Achievement, becoming one of the youngest actresses to receive the recognition.

== Major awards ==
=== Fakt Marathi Cine Sanman ===
The Fakt Marathi Cine Sanman is an annual event organized by the Marathi television channel Fakt Marathi to honour excellence in Marathi cinema.

Year	Nominated work	Category	Result	Ref.
2022	Chandramukhi	Best Actress in a Lead Role	Won	
2023	Autograph	Best Actress in a Lead Role	Nominated	

=== Filmfare Awards Marathi ===
The Filmfare Marathi Awards are presented annually by The Times Group for excellence in cinematic achievements in Marathi cinema.

Year	Nominated work	Category	Result	Ref.
2016	Katyar Kaljat Ghusali	Best Supporting Actress	Nominated	
2023	Pondicherry	Best Supporting Actress	Nominated	
2023	Chandramukhi	Best Actress	Nominated	

=== Maharashtra State Film Awards ===
The Maharashtra State Film Awards are presented annually by the Government of Maharashtra for excellence of cinematic achievements in Marathi cinema.

Year	Nominated work	Category	Result	Ref.
2016	Katyar Kaljat Ghusali	Best Supporting Actress	Nominated	
2025	Chandramukhi	Best Actress	Won	

=== Maharashtracha Favourite Kon ===
The Maharashtracha Favourite Kon? are presented annually by the Marathi television channel Zee Talkies to honour excellence in Marathi cinema. Khanvilkar won three awards in two categories from sixteen nominations.

Year	Nominated work	Category	Result	Ref.
2010	Gaiir	Favourite Actress	Nominated	
2010	—N/a	Most Popular Face of the Year	Nominated	
2011	Arjun	Favourite Actress	Nominated	
2012	Zhakaas	Favourite Actress	Won	
2012	—N/a	Most Popular Face of the Year	Nominated	
2014	—N/a	Most Popular Face of the Year	Won	
2015	—N/a	Most Popular Face of the Year	Nominated	
2016	—N/a	Most Popular Face of the Year	Nominated	
2016	Katyar Kaljat Ghusali	Favourite Actress	Nominated	
2017	—N/a	Most Popular Face of the Year	Nominated	
2021	—N/a	Most Popular Face of the Decade	Nominated	
2021	Zhakaas	Favourite Actress of the Decade	Nominated	
2022	Chandramukhi	Favourite Actress	Won	
2022	Har Har Mahadev	Favourite Supporting Actress	Nominated	
2022	—N/a	Most Popular Face of the Year	Nominated	
2023	—N/a	Most Popular Face of the Year	Nominated	

=== Stardust Awards ===
The Stardust Awards are an annual event organized by Magna Publishing Company Limited.

Year	Nominated work	Category	Result	Ref.
2009	Phoonk	Exciting New Face	Nominated	

=== Zee Chitra Gaurav Puraskar ===
The Zee Chitra Gaurav Puraskar are presented annually by the Zee Marathi television network to honour both artistic and technical excellence in the Marathi-language film industry of India.

Year	Nominated work	Category	Result	Ref.
2010	Gaiir	Best Actress	Nominated	
2016	Katyar Kaljat Ghusali	Best Supporting Actress	Nominated	
2016	Katyar Kaljat Ghusali	Natural Performer Of The Year	Won	
2023	Chandramukhi	Best Actress	Nominated	

== Miscellaneous awards ==
Year	Award	Category	Nominated work	Result	Ref.
2013	CineRockom International Film Festival	Best Actress	Aayna Ka Bayna	Won	
2017	Lokmat Maharashtra's Most Stylish	Maharashtra's Most Stylish – Reader's Choice	—N/a	Won	
2018	City Cine Awards	Best Actress	Bus Stop	Nominated	
2018	Majha Sanman Puraskar	Actress for Contribution in Art	—N/a	Honoured	
2019	Lokmat Stylish Awards	Actress for Contribution to Regional Cinema	—N/a	Honoured	
2019	IWMBuzz Digital Awards	Best Performer in a Negative Role (Female)	Damaged	Won	
2019	ScreenXX Summit & Awards	Best Actress in a Negative Role – Hindi Web Originals	Damaged	Won	
2019	Sakal Premier Awards	Special Contribution Award	—N/a	Honoured	
2020	Zee Talkies Comedy Awards	Best Actress	Choricha Mamla	Won	
2021	City Cine Awards	Best Actress	Choricha Mamla	Nominated	
2021	Majja Digital Awards Film	Outstanding Actor in a Lead Role (Female)	Choricha Mamla	Nominated	
2022	Pune Times Mirror Hall of Fame Award	Contribution in the field of Cinema and Entertainment	—N/a	Honoured	
2022	Maharashtra Gaurav Sanman	Best Actress	Chandramukhi	Won	
2022	Navarashtra Planet Marathi Film & OTT Awards	Best Actress	Chandramukhi	Nominated	
2022	Sakal Sanman	Most Talented Actress	—N/a	Won	
2022	Pravah Picture Awards	Best Actress	Chandramukhi	Nominated	
2022	Pravah Picture Awards	Best Supporting Actress	Pondicherry	Nominated	
2022	Maharashtra Times Sanman	Best Actress	Chandramukhi	Nominated	
2023	City Cine Awards	Best Actress	Chandramukhi	Nominated	
2023	Lokmat Sakhi Awards	Best Actor Films	Chandramukhi	Won	
2023	Sakal Premier Awards	Best Actress	Chandramukhi	Nominated	
2024	Mid-Day Showbiz Icons Awards	Marathi Trailblazer of the Year	—N/a	Won	
2024	Sanskruti Kala Darpan	Best Actress	Autograph	Nominated	
2024	Lokmat Stylish Awards	Most Stylish – Actress	—N/a	Won	
2025	Pune Festival Award	Lifetime Achievement Award	—N/a	Honoured	
2025	Influential Leaders Maharashtra	Most Inspirational in the field of Entertainment (Acting)	—N/a	Won	
2026	Times Business Awards	Emerging Brand in Heritage Sareers	Amulya by Amruta	Won	

== See also ==
- List of accolades received by Chandramukhi
