= F. M. (name) =

F. M. or F.M. may refer to:

- F. M. Bailey

- Frederick Manson Bailey (1827–1915), Australian botanist
- Frederick Marshman Bailey (1882–1967), British soldier and explorer

- F. M. Busby (1921-2005), American science fiction writer
- F. M. Cornford (1874-1943), English classical scholar and translator
- F. M. Devienne (1913-2003), French physicist
- F.M. Einheit (born 1958), German industrial and electronic musician and actor
- F. M. Hollams (1877–1963), British painter of horses and dogs
- F. M. Howarth (1864–1908) was an American cartoonist and pioneering comic strip artist
- F. M. Ilyas, Indian film director, screenwriter, and producer
- F. M. Mayor (1872-1932), English novelist and short story writer
- F. M. Powell (1848-1903) was an American physician and medical superintendent
- F. M. Powicke (1879-1963), English medieval historian
- F. M. Simmons (1854-1940), American politician

== See also ==
- FM
