= Amruta Khanvilkar =

Indian actress (born 1984)

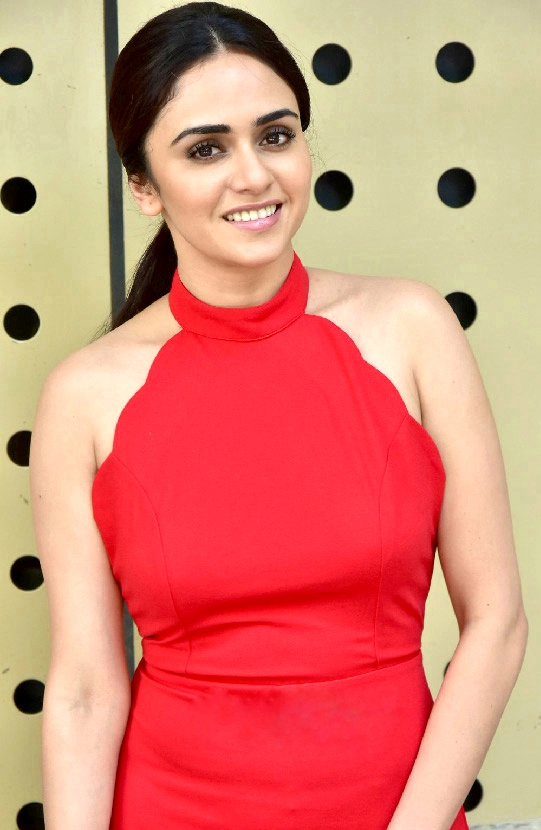
- Khanvilkar in 2022
- Born: 23 November 1984 (age 41); Mumbai, Maharashtra, India
- Occupations: Actress; producer
- Years active: 2004–present
- Works: Full list
- Spouse: Himanshu Malhotra (m. 2015)
- Relatives: Mohit Malhotra (brother-in-law)
- Awards: Full list

Amruta Khanvilkar (pronounced [əmrut̪aː kʰaːnʋilkəɾ]; born 23 November 1984) is an Indian film, television, theatre actress and producer who works primarily in Marathi and Hindi films. She is one of the highest-paid actresses in Marathi cinema and has received several accolades, including a Maharashtra State Film Award, a Zee Chitra Gaurav Puraskar, and three Maharashtracha Favourite Kon awards.

Khanvilkar aspired to be a film actress from an early age and began her career as a contestant on India's Best Cinestars Ki Khoj in 2004. She made her Marathi film debut with Golmaal (2006), followed by her Hindi debut with Mumbai Salsa (2007). This was followed by commercial success with the romcom Saade Maade Teen (2007), the supernatural horror Phoonk (2008) and the suspense thriller Gaiir (2009). She gained popularity in 2010 with her Lavani dance performance "Wajle Ki Bara" from the Marathi film Natarang. Her performance in the highly praised Katyar Kaljat Ghusali in 2015 won her praise and nominations at the Maharashtra State Film Awards and Filmfare Awards Marathi. Her other notable films are Shala (2011), Aayna Ka Bayna (2012), Welcome Zindagi (2015) and Choricha Mamla (2020). Khanvilkar made her mark with roles in the high-profile Hindi films Raazi (2018), Malang (2020) and made her OTT debut with the web series Damaged, all of which received praise for her portrayal of a complex characters.

The titular role of a tragic Tamasha performer in romantic drama Chandramukhi earned her huge critical and commercial acclaim, and gained further success with the drama Pondicherry and epic historical Har Har Mahadev (both 2022). From 2024 onwards, Khanvilkar continued to shine with diverse roles in Hindi web series Lootere, 36 Days and Taskaree.

In addition to her work in films, Khanvilkar has also been in reality shows such as Nach Baliye 7, where she won, and Fear Factor: Khatron Ke Khiladi 10, as well as anchoring Dance Maharashtra Dance – Season 1 (2012), Dance India Dance 6, and Famously Filmfare Marathi (2019).

== Early life and education ==
Khanvilkar was born in Pune on 23 November 1984 into a Marathi family to Ajit and Gauri Khanvilkar. She has a younger sister, Aditi, who is an air hostess. She was raised in a joint family with her four aunts and grandparents in Vile Parle. Initially, she attended Mahila Sangh School, but her family moved to Pune in 1994 following the 1993 Mumbai attacks. There, she continued her education at Karnataka High School and later graduated from Marathwada Mitra Mandal College of Commerce. From a young age, she developed a passion for dance, although her father was initially hesitant to support her in pursuing it.

== Career ==
=== Early work and film debut (2004–2009) ===
Khanvilkar began her career in 2004 as a contestant on one of the first reality shows on Indian television, Zee Cine Star ki Khoj, and the same year she co-starred alongside Amitabh Bhattacharjee in the Hindi short film Saanjh, presented by the Film and Television Institute of India, a film which won the National Film Award for Best Non-Feature Film on Family Welfare. This led to further appearances on the Hindi television shows A.D.A. and Time Bomb 9/11 in 2005.

Khanvilkar made her film debut in the Marathi comedy Golmaal (2006), in which she was paired opposite Bharat Jadhav and Jitendra Joshi, and her performance was well received. In 2007, she made her Hindi film debut in Mumbai Salsa, portraying a nymphomaniac flatmate to Manjari Phadnis' character. The critic Taran Adarsh of Bollywood Hungama found her performance "excellent" in the film. Soon after, she made small appearance in Milan Luthria's Hattrick (2007). Khanvilkar's biggest commercial success of that year was Zee Talkies' Saade Maade Teen, the remake of the 1958 Hindi film Chalti Ka Naam Gaadi. Her character was based on the role played by Madhubala in 1958 film, where she played a rich orphan staying with her uncle and falls in love with the garage proprietor played by Jadhav. The film earned ₹4.50 crore (US$470,000) to become one of the highest grossing Marathi films of that time.

In 2008, she collaborated with director Ram Gopal Verma on two films: Contract and Phoonk. Contract is an action drama film set against the backdrop of terrorism and infiltration. She played an ex-Special Protection Group commando's wife who is killed in a terrorist attack. The film got mixed reviews from critics and audiences upon release and failed commercially. The next release was the supernatural horror film Phoonk, co-starring Sudeep, based on superstition and black magic, Khanvilkar's portrayal of a mature woman with a de-glamorized look was critically acclaimed. A critic approved of her effort, noting that she "comes out well as a worrying mother", and Taran Adarsh called her performance "efficient". She received a Stardust Exciting New Face nomination, and the film was declared a box office blockbuster with an earning of ₹60 crore (US$6.2 million). In 2009, Khanvilkar starred in Gaiir, a big budget Marathi suspense thriller film directed by Satish Rajwade which revolves around a newly married couple. She played an NRI's girl who marries a corporate giant (played by Sandeep Kulkarni), however she finds her husband's duplicate, who is trying to harm her. A review in Marathi Movie World wrote, "The Marathi film industry has got another talented actress in the form of Amruta" and Prasanna Zore of Rediff.com called her, "glamorous for a change compared to her plain-Jane looks" and wrote, "Khanvilkar looks very attractive in the two songs that seem contrived to raise the glamour-quotient of the film." The film generated huge box office returns and she earned her first Best Actress nomination at Zee Chitra Gaurav Puraskar and Maharashtracha Favourite Kon. Also that year, she appeared in the cult single "Aye Hip Hopper" by Ishq Bector.

=== Breakthrough and career advancement (2010–2013) ===
Khanvilkar's career prospects improved in 2010 when she gained widespread popularity for her Lavani performance in the song "Wajle Ki Bara" in Ravi Jadhav's film Natarang, which was sung by Bela Shende. She was not the original choice for the song and entered the song a day prior to its shoot. Khanvilkar reminisced about the experience, "saying yes to 'Wajle Ki Bara' was one of the best decisions of my career." The song made her famous even in the interiors of Maharashtra, reviewer Chetana Panchal described her cameo as "impressive" The same year, she reprised her role as Aarti in Phoonk 2. It was not as well-received as the first film, but Khanvilkar's work was appreciated. Sonia Chopra of Sify noted her as "superb, especially when she's trying to convince Rajiv of the odd goings-on in the house," Komal Nahta of Koimoi.com wrote, "she does justice to her role and is very natural" and DNA's Taran Adarsh found Khanvilkar's portrayal to be "expressive enough." Moreover, the film was average at the box office.

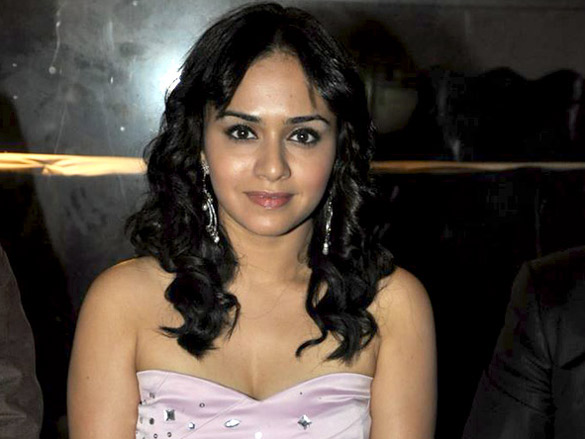
Khanvilkar in 2011 at an event

In 2011, she portrayed Marathi teacher Paranajpe Bai in Sujay Dahake's Shala, based on Milind Bokil's novel of the same name. Keyur Seta opined, "Khanvilkar does well, she should have been given more lines" The film premiered at the New York Indian Film Festival and went on to win the Silver Lotus Award at the 59th National Film Awards. Following that, she appeared as lead in Arjun as a supportive girlfriend opposite Sachit Patil, the film received mixed reviews but did well commercially. Khanvilkar next accepted a role of a village girl opposite Ankush Chaudhari in the Zhakaas, which marked her third collaboration with Zee Talkies. Chetana Panchal wrote that, "it is Amruta Khanvilkar in that typical village type but glamorous looks, invites all the attention. Her perfect accent suited to that character of Manjula has brought liveliness in every scene that she appears." The film was a major success and won three Maharashtracha Favourite Kon Awards, including Favourite Actress for Khanvilkar.

The following year, Khanvilkar was seen in Aditya Sarpotdar's musical Satrangi Re, a story about a group of friends in their final year of graduation who share a common passion for music. She played Alisha, who falls in love with Rego (played by Adinath Kothare) during the contest. Her next release of that year was the musical drama Aayna Ka Bayna, where she portrayed dance therapist for nine talented juveniles to take part in a dance reality show. The film was highly hyped even before its release and upon release, the film garnered a positive response from critics and the audience. Khanvilkar was regarded, "perfect for the role" by The Times of India. Critic Ullhas Shirke wrote, "Khanvilkar, puts up an astounding emotion filled performance..." and further noted, "Her concern for the society is clearly noticed through her body language and spontaneous expressions." Another reviewer called it a, "strong performance" and concluded, "She manages to speak through expressions and is perfect during the dance sequences." Her performance won her Best Actress at the CineRockom International Film Festival.

=== Further career and acclaim (2015–2021) ===
Following a year-long absence, Khanvilkar returned in 2015 with five releases. Her first release was Baji, the first superhero film in Marathi, in which she played a fearless young girl who is the love interest of the titular character, portrayed by Shreyas Talpade. Surabhi Redkar of Koimoi.com marked her "impressive" and stated, "Nothing challenging in her role, but she does a fine job," while The Times of India's Mihir Bhanage found that, "she displays a certain level of maturity while essaying her role." The film was declared a hit at the box office, earning ₹10.79 crore (US$1.1 million). Her next release was Vikram Bhatt's first Marathi production, Ek Doosrey Ke Liye, a production that had been delayed since 2013. Next, she appeared in Welcome Zindagi, opposite Swapnil Joshi a dark comedy about life and death that was a Marathi remake of the Bengali film Hemlock Society. She portrayed an independent girl whose life is unstable and who feels ignored and betrayed in society so she thinks to end her life, but her life changes when a guy enters her life. A review in the Maharashtra Times asserted, "She perfectly embodied the wisdom that comes from training from isolation."

In her next movie from the same year, she gained more recognition for her portrayal of Muslim girl Zareena, in Subodh Bhave's directorial feature film Katyar Kaljat Ghusali, which was based on the play of the same name. Khanvilkar's part required her to master the fine nuances of the Urdu language, which she achieved in pronunciation and diction with the help of her on-screen father, Sachin Pilagaonkar. Khanvilkar's performance was widely acclaimed, with a critic, Amar Udare, calling her "a surprise package," The film was one of the most expensive movies of Marathi cinema; it was chosen as one of the 26 films to be screened in Goa at the 46th International Film Festival of India. Katyar Kaljat Ghusali earned over ₹40 crore (US$4.2 million) and emerge as one of the highest-grossing Marathi films of all time and received eight Filmfare Marathi Awards, including Best Film. Khanvilkar eventually was nominated for the 53rd Maharashtra State Film Awards, Filmfare Marathi Awards and Zee Chitra Gaurav Puraskar in Best Supporting Actress category. Another film in which she has appeared was Aawahan, alongside Bhave and Sachin Khedekar.

Khanvilkar then teamed up on the mystery drama One Way Ticket (2016) with Sachit Patil, Shashank Ketkar, and Gashmeer Mahajani. It was the first Marathi film to be shot on a cruise ship, as well as in locations such as Italy and Spain. The film got mixed reviews, but the performances were acclaimed. In 2017, Khanvilkar made a small appearance as Maharani in the period war drama film Rangoon. She next worked in the Hindi cineplay Baaki Itihaas, directed by Nikhil Mahajan, which was based on the iconic Bengali play by Badal Sarcar of the same name. Her final release of that year was the poorly received Bus Stop where she played a grey shade character of college going girl. Critics found the film to be outdated, but Shalaka Nalawade of The Times of India said about Khanvilkar's performance that she "breaks free from her good-girl image and plays the bindaas, gold-digger Sharayu to the T."

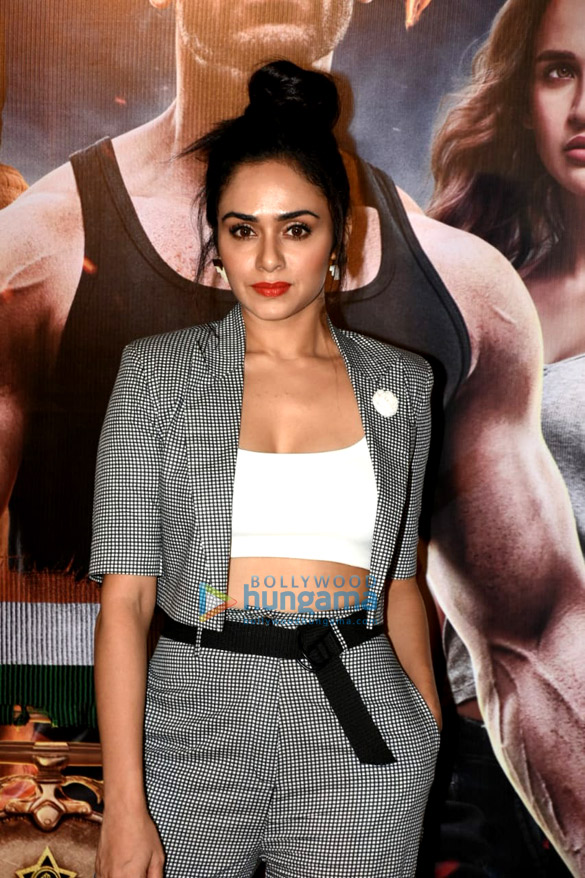
Khanvilkar at trailer launch of Satyameva Jayate (2018)

Subsequently, Khanvilkar was recognized for her contributions to Hindi projects in 2018. In Meghna Gulzar's Raazi, she plays Alia Bhatt's Pakistani widowed sister-in-law Munira. Both reviewers and the public praised her performance. Koimoi.com review credit her as the "eternally beautiful." This also marked her first feature in a Hindi film in eight years. Her next role was as the vivacious and mischievous wife opposite Manoj Bajpayee in Satyameva Jayate, directed by Milap Zaveri. Devesh Sharma of Filmfare opined, "Amruta don't have much to do really, other than looking pretty" and Bollywood Hungama thought that Khanvilkar's talent was completely wasted and that's unfortunate considering that she just gave a memorable performance in Raazi. The film earned ₹110 crore (US$11 million) worldwide gross. She had a brief appearance in the Marathi biographical drama film Ani... Dr. Kashinath Ghanekar, where she enacted Sandhya Shantaram's role of Chandrakala from the Marathi film Pinjra (1972). Later that year, she made her digital debut as Lady Serial Killer, Lavina Birdie, in the first season of the web series titled Damaged, opposite Amit Sial for Hungama Play, playing an unusual and path-breaking character, at first she was reluctant to perform a bold character in front of the camera. In preparation for her part she read several mysterious books. For her portrayal critics wrote, "Amruta probably took up a mighty challenge, but by the end of the show it is hard to imagine any other actor who could have played Lovina better." Another wrote, "She essays the role of the deviant Lovina so well that for one moment you can't distinguish between the actor and the character. Her role, albeit a difficult one, has her toggling through the entire gamut of emotions and she makes it seem like child's play. It's heartening to see stories like this being crafted and roles like these being taken up by such talented actors." She won several awards in Best Actress in a Negative Role category.

In 2019, she made her Marathi television debut as an actress with a leading role in Jeevlaga, alongside Swapnil Joshi and Siddharth Chandekar. The story explore the different shades of relationships, where Khanvilkar plays an unconventional role of Kavya, who has an extramarital affair with her ex-boyfriend. Next, Khanvilkar took on the role of the troubled Catholic wife of upright cop (played by Kunal Khemu) in Mohit Suri's action thriller Malang (2020), with several critics praising her performance with fewer words but a more expressive character. Malang has earned ₹84.50 crore (US$8.8 million) worldwide thus becoming a commercial success. She won the Zee Talkies Comedy Award for Best Actress for Priyadarshan Jadhav's Choricha Mamla, a situational comedy that takes place within a single night. Khanvilkar was cast as a modern married woman who sings and dance and need producer to launch her album. Ajay Parchure of Lokmat wrote, "has also done her best and perfectly portrays the madness of Shraddha's character."

The following year, she acted in the Marathi drama Well Done Baby (2021), which depicts the narrative of a modern young couple attempting to identify the purpose of their relationship while simultaneously dealing with the arrival of a new member into their life. A Mashable critic stated, "She aces it as Meera. Her frustrations, her dilemma, her insecurities, and her urge to gain some kind of normalcy in her life are brought to the fore by Khanvilkar so immaculately." The film was released directly on Amazon Prime Video.

=== Established actress (2022–present) ===
In 2022, She next portrayed a downtrodden girl in Sachin Kundalkar's Pondicherry which was the first Marathi and one of the first Indian feature films to be shot completely on a smartphone. The Times of India's Mihir Bhange described her as "a surprise package" and wrote that "her role is brief, but she does complete justice to it." Suyog Zore of Cinestaan called it as her best performance till now and wrote, "does a fine job as a woman who is finding it hard to come to terms with her mistake." The film received her second Filmfare Best Supporting Actress nomination.

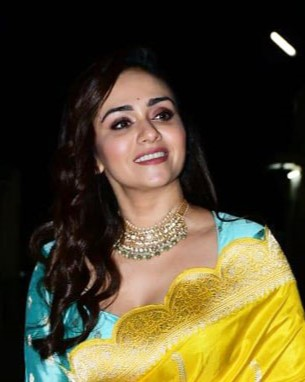
Khanvilkar at the trailer launch of Har Har Mahadev in 2022.

Khanvilkar got her first titular role, as a tragic Tamasha performer in Prasad Oak's Marathi musical love drama Chandramukhi, based on Vishwas Patil's renowned novel of the same name. She was Oak's first choice, but her part was kept fully secret until it was unveiled at the Royal Opera House by a 35-foot-tall cut-out dressed as Chandra. She went through eight months of training to improve her language and diction while also gaining over 15 kg to fit the role. The film and her performance were both anticipated and commercially successful. Shubham Kulkarni of Koimoi.com ascribed her hard work and her expressive eyes and wrote, "[Khanvilkar] is an actor who can do amazing work if given a good director. With a film on her shoulders, she manages to have the depth in her eyes and pain in her demeanour. She is exploited, looked at with a bad gaze, and even tried to be sold." Cinestaan critic, Suyog Zore, saying "...the film belongs to Khanvilkar. The actress has simply poured herself into the character." Chandramukhi won her the Maharashtra State Film Award for Best Actress, the Fakt Marathi Cine Sanman, and the second MFK Award for Favourite Actress, while also earning her first Filmfare Marathi Award for Best Actress nomination. Her next brief appearance was in the pan-Indian Marathi historical action film Har Har Mahadev. The film received positive reviews, with critics praising Khanvilkar for her impressive portrayal of Sonabai. Shaheen Irani of OTTPlay thought her brief role was more impactful than Sharad Kelkar. Both of these films became the fifth and fourth highest grossing Marathi films of the year, respectively. Khanvilkar next reteamed with Satish Rajwade in the romantic drama film Autograph – Ek Japun Thevavi Ashi Lovestory. Collaborating once again with Chaudhari, she played a Malayali girl belonging to a conservative family who falls in love with a Maharashtrian guy. The film was initially going to release in December 2022, but for unknown reasons, it had its direct release on the Star Pravah television channel in May 2023. Autograph received her second Best Actress nomination at Fakt Marathi Cine Sanman.

In 2024, she took on multiple challenging roles across Hindi and Marathi cinema and streaming platforms. She starred in Video Cam Scam, a gripping crime thriller delving into cybercrime and sextortion, where she portrayed an ex-IT cell officer determined to uncover her husband's blackmailers, starring Rajneesh Duggal. Both the series and her performance garnered praise. Next she also appeared in the Disney+ Hotstar action drama series Lootere, revolving around the intense narrative of a Ukrainian trading vessel hijacked by Somali pirates in international waters. Casts as the wife of a self-centered port president (played by Vivek Gomber), her character embarks on a journey to find her maid's missing son. Director Jai Mehta was deeply impressed by her audition, and he remarked, "I was blown away with her spot-on performance." She mentioned that filming the series in South Africa was tough because it involved many dangerous and risky situations. The series opened to universally positive reviews from critics and the audience. Saibal Chatterjee of NDTV hailed her as "terrific" and wrote, "The marital drama strand, bolstered by strong performances from Gomber and Khanvilkar, adds emotional depth to the plot," while Tushar Joshi of India Today noted, "Khanvilkar is in top form, and her scenes with Vivek are one of the highlights of the show." Additionally, she made a memorable appearance in the third season of the acclaimed Amazon miniseries Chacha Vidhayak Hain Humare. She portrays a media-savvy political rival opposite Chacha, her character, who persuades Zakir Khan's character to join her Party. Critics praised her introduction to the series, noting her superb performance as Surekhaji. Her fourth series of the year, 36 Days, an ensemble crime thriller produced by BBC Studios and Applause Entertainment and adapted from the British series 35 Days. She played a Marathi girl with big dreams and lofty aspirations, striving to achieve them through a questionable side hustle, set in the luxurious backdrop of Goa, starred opposite Sharib Hashmi. Her performance was described as a "a refreshing touch of comedic relief amidst the tension" by Bollywood Helpline’s Ravi Sharma, while DNA's Riya Sharma remarked, "Khanvilkar and Hashmi are exceptional and quite convincing as a middle-class couple trying to adjust in a high-class society. Their emotions are what make them most relatable."

In addition to her Hindi projects, Khanvilkar starred in the Marathi film Like Aani Subscribe, a story tackling modern social media issues. She played a social worker helping a girl trapped in a serious predicament. Sameer Ahire of Movie Talkies praised her performance, writing, "Khanvilkar springs a nice surprise as she plays a sophisticated and mature character, far from her glamorous image." Although well received by critics, the film underperformed at the box office. She then portrayed Maharani Yesubai, the wife of the historic Maratha warrior Chhatrapati Sambhaji Maharaj, in Urvita Productions' epic historical war drama Dharmarakshak Mahaveer Chhatrapati Sambhaji Maharaj, co-starring Thakur Anoop Singh. Despite her limited screen time, critics praised her performance. Mudit Bhatnagar of Times Now commended her for bringing "grace and depth" to the role, while Santosh Bhingarde of Sakal described her portrayal as "brilliant," adding that "the tough and strong Maharani is played well by Amruta." The film received rave reviews and grossed ₹12.7 crore (US$1.3 million) at the box office, making it the sixth highest-grossing Marathi film of the year. She was also seen in the Hindi film The Taj Story, marking her return to Hindi cinema after five years, as a documentary filmmaker; however, the film received a largely negative response.

January 2026 proved to be one of the busiest months, beginning with her stage debut in the Marathi play Lagna Panchami, co-starring Swapnil Joshi, which she also co-produced. She appeared as a tough customs officer at Mumbai airport investigating an international smuggling syndicate in the Netflix series Taskaree, created by Neeraj Pandey, alongside Emraan Hashmi and Nandish Sandhu. The series became the first Indian show to top Netflix’s global non-English television list. A reviewer for Bollywood Hungama praised her action sequences as “lovely,” writing that “Khanvilkar gets completely into the skin of the character and raises laughs as well.” She subsequently appeared in Space Gen: Chandrayaan, playing the motivating wife of an ISRO scientist involved in the Chandrayaan mission and its backstory. Following to this, critics observed that her brief cameo in Tu Yaa Main helped to establish the film’s dark and suspenseful tone.

== Personal life ==
Khanvilkar has maintained a strong relationship with her family and lives in Lokhandwala, a neighbourhood in Mumbai. A practicing Hindu, Khanvilkar is a follower of Swami Samarth and she is a regular visitor to the temple. Regarding her religious affiliations, she expressed, "The power of Swami is truly remarkable. I can't really explain it with words; you have to experience it yourself. The tough times I've gotten through, the lows I've been pulled out of—those are personal journeys that are hard to put into words." She met co-participant Himanshu Malhotra on the sets of India's Best Cinestars Ki Khoj and they fell in love. After a decade of dating, the couple married on 24 January 2015, in Delhi. That year, they both won the dancing reality show Nach Baliye season 7. She is reluctant to discuss her personal life, which has been the subject of media attention in India. She remarked, "I'm traditional in my approach. Himmanshoo and I go way back—to a time before Instagram even existed, back in 2004, when we used to take pictures with a camera. We want to safeguard each other's identities and respect that."

At the age of thirty-eight, she began training in Kathak with Manjiri Deo and completed her arangetram in November 2023, earning first place in the university. Speaking about it, Khanvilkar shared, "Every child dreams of doing such and such when they grow up. I also dreamed of learning Kathak. But as a child, our financial situation was dire, so I could not take Kathak training. I am very happy that wish is now coming true."

== Other work and media image ==
Apart from acting, Khanvilkar has been noted for her skills as a dancer and has participated in several stage and reality shows. In 2007, she participated in the first season of the Marathi dance reality show Eka Peksha Ek, where she emerged as the first runner-up. Since the early 2010s, she has been a part of Mahesh Tilekar's "Marathi Taraka" stage production, which has been staged in various cities across India, including Rashtrapati Bhavan. In later years, she hosted Comedy Express (2008–2009), Maharashtracha Superstar – Season1 (2009–2010), and Dance Maharashtra Dance – Season1 (2012). Between 15 and 19 October 2013, she performed for "Marathi Taraka" at the Baramulla border with several other Marathi actresses, including Bhargavi Chirmule, Pooja Sawant, Smita Tambe, and Nehha Pendse.

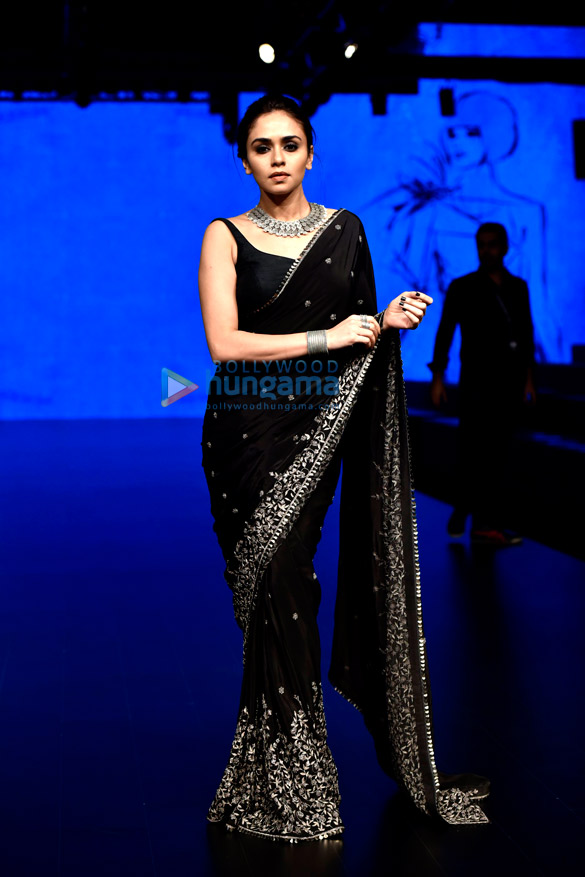
Khanvilkar at Lakmé Fashion Week 2018

She, along with her husband, won the celebrity dance reality show Nach Baliye season 7. In 2015, she walked the runway for designer Manali Jagtap's "Star Walk for Umeed", an NGO that helps disabled children. In 2017, Khanvilkar appeared as a judge in the Marathi dance reality programme 2 MAD alongside Umesh Jadhav and Sanjay Jadhav, and went on to co-host the dance series Dance India Dance Season 6 with Sahil Khattar. At the 2017 Pune Times Fashion Week, she and actor Vaibhav Tatwawadi were the show stoppers for the designer Shruti Mangaaysh. In August 2017, a wax statue of Khanvilkar was displayed in the wax museums of Lonavala and Devgad.

The next year, she co-judged Super Dancer Maharashtra, another Marathi dancing reality show, with Vitthal Patil and Satish Rajwade, and also served as the host of Famously Filmfare Marathi, a chat show where she interviewed prominent actors from the Marathi film industry. Over the years, she has collaborated with various brands on numerous occasions, including S S Nagarkar Jewellers, Indriya Jewels, and MB Ashtekar Jewellers. The Times of India ranked her at 4th and 3rd in their "Maharashtra's Most Desirable Women" list in 2017 and 2019, respectively. Khanvilkar also participated as a contestant in Indian stunt reality serials Fear Factor: Khatron Ke Khiladi 10 and dance show Jhalak Dikhhla Jaa 10, where she ended up finishing in 8th and 9th place, respectively. Her elimination in the latter resulted in significant viewer outrage for the show. In 2021, she started her YouTube channel, where she gives glimpses into her life and dance videos under the name "Amritkala", in which she performed with choreographer Ashish Patil, and in 2023, she presented the travel show Ticket to Maharashtra with Amruta Khanvilkar.

In 2022, as a part of promotion for the film, Khanvilkar was featured on the cover of Filmfare Magazine, becoming the first Marathi actor to grace the cover. On the occasion of Navratri 2022, she made her debut in singing by collaborating with the Abhanga Repost troupe on a Bharud song titled "Akkal Yeu De". In 2023, she presented her first Kathak performance at the National Centre of Performing Arts on Madhubala's renowned song "Mohe Panghat Pe" from Mughal-e-Azam, and also took part in the Maharashtra Premier League's inaugural ceremony at MCA Stadium in Pune. In that very year, she released a devotional Ganpati song Ganaraj Gajanan under her banner Amritkala Studios, which was sung by National Award winner Rahul Deshpande. In an interview with the Pune Mirror, Khanvilkar stated that as a producer, she have a genuine passion for working alongside new and creative minds, as her goal is to make a meaningful contribution to the world of art and creativity. On 11 December 2024, she performed at the International Gita Mahotsav in Ujjain, alongside Adbhut Collective Arts, in a show titled "Tales of Krishna" and judged the children's reality show Drama Juniors. Khanvilkar made her theatre debut with her own production — a 90-minute semi-classical dance musical titled World of Stree, which celebrates the essence of womanhood through four segments, performed along with Ashish Patil and a team of ten dancers. The show premiered with three performances at the Tata Theatre of National Centre for the Performing Arts, Mumbai. She was officially announced as the brand ambassador for Joy n Crew and Medimix Ayurveda in 2025.
