= Farnaz Shetty =

Indian actress

- Citizenship: India
- Occupation: Actress

Farnaz Shetty is an Indian actress who works in the Hindi and Telugu television/film Industries.

== Early life ==
Shetty has stated that her mother had wanted her to pursue a career in aviation or acting. She was approached by a casting director in a coffee shop for her first role in Dil Ki Nazar Se Khoobsurat.

== Filmography ==
=== Television ===
Year	Title	Role	Notes	Ref(s)
2013	Dil Ki Nazar Se Khoobsurat	Tiya	TV debut	
2013	Balika Vadhu	Kanchan		
2013–2015	Ek Veer Ki Ardaas...Veera	Gunjan Kaur Singh		
2015–2016	Suryaputra Karn	Vrushali		
2017	Waaris	Manpreet "Mannu" Pawania Bajwa/ Preet		
2017	Fear Files	Siddhi	Season 3	
2018–2019	Siddhi Vinayak	Siddhi Joshi/ Riddhi Sen		
2019	Laal Ishq	Pari	Episode: "Pretganj Ki Holi"	
2019	Laal Ishq	Tulsi	Episode: "Katila Shaitan"	
2019	Kahaan Hum Kahaan Tum	Raima Sengupta		
2022	Kashibai Bajirao Ballal	Rajkumari Mastani Bundela		
2022	Jai Hanuman - Sankat Mochan Naam Tiharo	Sita		
2023	Swaraj	Avantibai		

=== Films ===
Year	Title	Role	Language	Notes	Ref(s)
2019	Battalion 609	Bijli	Hindi	Film debut	
2022	Induvadana	Indu	Telugu	Telugu debut	

=== Web series ===
Year	Title	Role	Notes	Ref(s)
2021	The Paradox	Rima	Web debut	
2024	Video Cam Scam			
