= Lagna Panchami =

2026 Marathi-language play

- Original language: Marathi
- Written by: Madhugandha Kulkarni
- Music by: Tanmay Bhide; Background score: Sarang Kulkarni
- Lyrics by: Paresh Mokashi
- Genre: Comedy; Drama

Premiere
- Date: 9 January 2026
- Place: Shahu Kala Mandir, Satara
- Directed by: Nipun Dharmadhikari
- Original run: 120 minutes

Lagna Panchami (transl. The Fifth Day of Marriage) is a 2026 Indian Marathi-language comedy drama play written by Madhugandha Kulkarni and directed by Nipun Dharmadhikari. It stars Swapnil Joshi, with Amruta Khanvilkar in the female lead during its first 100 performances, after which she was replaced by Vidula Chougule. The play is produced by Mayasabha and presented by Swapnagandhamrut, the joint banner of Kulkarni, Joshi, Khanvilkar and Trupti Patil.

The play premiered on 9 January 2026 in Satara and completed 100 performances by June 2026.

== Premise ==
The play is about a husband and wife and the everyday ups and downs of their married life. Its central idea is that a person does not marry just one individual, but all the different temperaments and moods that exist within that one person. The story opens with an unexpected fantasy sequence and goes on to look at the tensions, contradictions and misunderstandings of contemporary middle-class marriage through humour.

== Cast ==
- Swapnil Joshi as Satvik
- Amruta Khanvilkar as Suryaja (January–June; August 2026)
  - Vidula Chougule as Suryaja (June 2026–present)
- Madhugandha Kulkarni as Vidhyulata / Satvik's mother
- Sunil Abhyankar as Brushaspati / Yama / Satvik's father
  - Mukesh Jadhav as Brushaspati / Yama / Satvik's father

== Production ==
Lagna Panchami is the first collaboration between Madhugandha Kulkarni and Nipun Dharmadhikari. It was announced for release at the beginning of the new year, 2026.

It marked Swapnil Joshi's return to the stage after twelve years, his previous play having been Get Well Soon, and was Amruta Khanvilkar's theatre debut. Joshi and Khanvilkar had previously appeared together in the Marathi television series Jeevlaga (2019).

== Performances ==
The play premiered on 9 January 2026 at Shahu Kala Mandir, Satara. Subsequent performances were held at Vishnudas Bhave Natya Mandir in Sangli, Yashwantrao Chavan Natya Gruha and Bal Gandharva Rang Mandir in Pune, as well as Master Deenanath Mangeshkar Natyagriha and Prabodhankar Thackeray Auditorium in Mumbai. On 2 May 2026, the play was staged at Tata Theatre, National Centre for the Performing Arts (NCPA), as part of the Pratibimb Marathi Natya Utsav.

In May 2026, a video circulated showing Swapnil Joshi briefly pausing a performance to ask the parents of a crying infant to take the child outside the auditorium before resuming the play. In June 2026, following the completion of 100 performances, Amruta Khanvilkar announced her departure from the cast due to her film commitments. She continued as one of the play's producers, while actress Vidula Chougule replaced her in the role. In August 2026, the play was staged internationally for the first time, with performances in Sydney, Brisbane and Melbourne, featuring Khanvilkar and Swapnil Joshi in the lead roles. It was also staged in the United Arab Emirates in October 2026.

== Reception ==
Rajiv Joshi of Maharashtra Times praised the performances, direction and technical aspects while criticising aspects of the writing and storytelling, noting that “Harmony in any relationship, not husband-wife, is the key issue!”

Actress Prajakta Mali praised the play after attending a performance in September 2026, highlighting Madhugandha Kulkarni's contributions as its writer, producer and actor.
