= Rafuchakkar =

- Genre: Heist; Comedy
- Written by: Arjun Singgh Baran; Kartik Nishandar
- Directed by: Ritam Srivastav
- Starring: Maniesh Paul; Priya Bapat; Aksha Pardasany; Sushant Singh; Chahat Vig; Lekha Prajapati
- Music by: Dewal Parashar
- Country of origin: India
- Original language: Hindi
- No. of seasons: 1
- No. of episodes: 9

Production
- Executive producers: Sunil Dolamani Panda; Rahul Rawat
- Producers: Arjun Singgh Baran; Jyoti Deshpande; Kartik Nishandar
- Production companies: GSEAMS; Jio Studios

Original release
- Network: JioCinema
- Release: 15 June 2023

Rafuchakkar is a 2023 Hindi-language heist comedy TV series on JioCinema. It is written by Arjun Singgh Baran and Kartik Nishandar and directed by Ritam Srivastav. It stars Maniesh Paul, Priya Bapat, Aksha Pardasany, Sushant Singh, Lekha Prajapati and Chahat Vig.

== Plot summary ==
A weird tale of Pawan Kumar, often known as Prince, who is accused of committing odd frauds involving anything from diet cookies to low-cost aeroplanes. A guy of many guises, is he a con artist or simply an upright man caught up in the web built up around him?

== Cast ==
- Maniesh Paul as Prince/ Pawan Kumar Bawariya / Ajay Chauhan
- Priya Bapat as Ritu Arora
- Aksha Pardasany as Shaurya
- Kuldeep Sareen as Pawan Kumar Bawariya's father
- Sushant Singh as Sarvesh Pathania
- Lekha Prajapati as Vinita Pathania
- Chahat Vig as Preeti Gogia
- Aakash Dahiya as Jaidev
- Vikram Kochhar as Ashfaq
- Shirin Sewani as Nupur
- Trupti Khamkar as Dimpy Patel
- Apurva Singh as Komal

== Release ==
Rafuchakkar is scheduled to be released on JioCinema on 15 June 2023.
