= Chahat Vig =

Indian actress

- Born: Pathankot, Punjab, India
- Occupations: Actress, Model
- Years active: 2018–present

Chahat Vig is an Indian actress. She is best known for her performances in 36 Days and Rafuchakkar.

== Biography ==
Chahat Vig was born in Pathankot, Punjab. She is a trained Hindustani classical singer and an alumnus of Whistling Woods International and Anupam Kher’s Actor Prepares.

Chahat began her acting career with a role in the theatrical production Yahudi Ki Ladki. She subsequently appeared in the play Andha Yug.

In 2023, she made her Hindi film debut with Gumraah, which featured Aditya Roy Kapoor and Mrunal Thakur. In the same year, she was also cast in the television series Rafuchakkar, alongside Maniesh Paul and Priya Bapat.

In 2024, she portrayed the character of Sia Walia in 36 Days, a television series produced by BBC India and Applause Entertainment.

== Filmography ==
Year	Film/TV series	Role	Notes
2023	Gumraah	Divya	Debut
2023	Rafuchakkar	Preeti Gogia	
2024	36 Days	Sia Walia	

=== Theatrical production ===
- Yahudi Ki Ladki
- Andha Yug
