= Ganaraj Gajanan =

Single by Rahul Deshpande
- Language: Marathi
- Released: 12 September 2023
- Recorded: 2023
- Studio: Sound Ideaz Studio
- Genre: Devotional; Classical music
- Length: 4:46
- Label: Amritkala Studios
- Composer: Rahul Deshpande
- Lyricist: Sameer Samant
- Producer: Amruta Khanvilkar

Music video
- Ganaraj Gajanan on YouTube

Ganaraj Gajanan is a 2023 Indian Marathi devotional song composed and sung by Rahul Deshpande, and the lyrics are penned by Sameer Samant. The track features actress Amruta Khanvilkar and singer Rahul Deshpande. Khanvilkar also produced it under the banner Amritkala Studios.

== Music video ==
The music video was shot at sets in the city, Bhiwandi, Maharashtra. It features Amruta Khanvilkar performing Kathak dance with six other dancers, along with Rahul Deshpande singing the song in the background.

== Development and release ==
Khanvilkar had a thought of doing this for around six months, which she shared with Deshpande, who started working on its music. She then approached her choreographer friend Ashish Patil and cinematographer Sanjay Memane, with whom she had previously worked for Chandramukhi (2022). The entire song was shot in a single day.

The song was announced with the poster featuring Khanvilkar and Deshpande on 8 September 2023, along with a short teaser of the music video the following day. The song was released on 12 September 2023, coinciding with Ganesh Chaturthi. Khanvilkar says "the song is a tribute to Ganesha as I make my debut as a producer."

== Personnel ==
- Singer & Composer : Rahul Deshpande
- Lyrics : Sameer Samant
- Music Producer & Arranger : Sarang Kulkarni
- Rhythm Arranger : Shikharnaad Qureshi
- Flute : Kiran Vinkar
- Veena : Narayan Mani
- Chorus : Umesh Joshi, Vijay Dhuri, Sagar Lele, Madhura Paranjape, Mrunmayee Dadke, Seema Lele, Rajeshwari Gaikwad
- Recorded & Mixed By : Vinayak Pawar at Sound Ideaz Studio
- Mastered By : Gethin John at Hafod Mastering, United Kingdom
- Label Manager & Music Management : Sumeet Jadhav
- Social Media & Channel Manager : Mohini Dighe
- Producer : Amruta Khanvilkar
- Executive Producer : Savitri Dhami
- Director of Photography : Sanjay Memane
- Choreography & Directed By : Ashish Patil
- Assistant Choreography : Gayatri Sapre
- Head of Kathak Girls : Priya Tipale Deo
- Kathak Artists : Tejashree Muley, Pooja Malkar, Mitali Inamdar, Vipra Samant, Drushti Wagh, Madhuri Karpe
- Editor : Premankur Bose (Promobox Studios LLP)
- Intro Titles & Ganpati Animation : Sachin Sanjay Kadam
- Production Head : Gargee Kadam
- Production Manager : Mithun Patel & Bunny
- Production Designer : Ketki D Ghuge
- Hair & Makeup Stylist : Urvashi Chauhan
- Costume : Ashwini Bhosale (Pratibimb) & Kashmira Sudrik
- Jewellery : Kankshini Studios
- Location : Sets In The City
- Amruta Khanvilkar Staff : Purushottam Joshi & Govind Mistry
- Rahul Deshpande Staff : Ankita Shedge & Akshay Shirke
