= 36 Days (TV series) =

2024 Indian television series

- Genre: Crime-thriller
- Written by: Anahata Menon; Seneca Mendonsa
- Directed by: Vishal Furia
- Starring: Neha Sharma; Purab Kohli; Chandan Roy Sanyal; Sharib Hashmi; Chahat Vig; Amruta Khanvilkar; Shruti Seth; Sushant Divgikar
- Country of origin: India
- Original language: Hindi
- No. of seasons: 1
- No. of episodes: 8

Production
- Executive producers: Swati Patnaik; Prasoon Garg; Deepali Handa
- Producers: Sameer Nair; Deepak Segal; Sameer Gogate
- Cinematography: Quais Waseeq
- Editor: Abhijeet Despande
- Production companies: Applause Entertainment; BBC Studio India

Original release
- Network: SonyLIV
- Release: 12 July 2024

36 Days also known as 36 Days: Secrets are injurious to health is an Indian Hindi-language crime-thriller streaming television series created for SonyLIV, by Vishal Furia and produced by Applause Entertainment and BBC Studios. The series features Neha Sharma, Purab Kohli, Chandan Roy Sanyal, Sharib Hashmi, Chahat Vig, Amruta Khanvilkar, Shruti Seth and Sushant Divgikar in the pivotal roles. Set in a serene suburban housing estate in Goa, this Indian thriller, an official adaptation by Anahata Menon of the British series 35 Days, explores a story of deceit, love, and suspense. When a mysterious woman arrives, she disrupts the neighborhood, leading to unexpected events, including a shocking murder, which intertwines the lives of the residents in a tale of mystery and suspense.

The series was officially announced by the streaming network in April 2023. Principal photography primarily took place in Goa, with key scenes shot in Vasco Da Gama and a few scenes shot in Mumbai.

36 Days premiered on 12 July 2024, to a positive response from audiences, although critics offered mixed reviews. The performances received praise, but the screenplay and predictability were criticized.

== Premise ==
The story begins with the murder of Farah Zaidi, an event that triggers a narrative countdown unfolding backwards from 36 days prior. Set within Casa De Magnolia, an upscale suburban housing complex located in Goa, its various residents are introduced.

Among them is Tony Walia, a chauvinistic womanizer whose outward charm masks a darker, more sinister side, Noel, a menacing drug lord whose presence casts a shadow over the community, Benaifer Machado, an overbearing baker grieving the loss of her daughter, harboring secrets that complicate her relationships, Tara, a transgender artist, who struggles against societal prejudices while seeking acceptance, Lalita, a successful but enigmatic businesswoman, and Dr. Rishikesh Jaykar, a celebrated microbiologist, hides a hidden agenda beneath his professional facade.

== Cast ==
=== Main ===
- Neha Sharma as Farah Zaidi aka Suhana Mohan: Sameera's sister, she is an air hostess seeking revenge for her sister's suicide, who moves into the diverse neighborhood of Casa De Magnolia.
- Purab Kohli as Rishi aka Dr. Rishikesh Jaykar: Radhika's husband, Advait's stepfather and Sameera's ex-boss. He is a writer dealing with unresolved marital issues.
- Chandan Roy Sanyal as Tony Walia: Sia's husband and the owner of Casa De Magnolia's land. He is drawn to Farah's beauty.
- Sharib Hashmi as Vinod Shinde: Lalita's husband and a casino manager who is suspicious of Farah from the start.
- Amruta Khanvilkar as Lalita Shinde: Vinod's wife and Bobo's sister. She is envious of Radhika and has lofty ambitions fulfilled through a shady side hustle involving drug sales.
- Shivam Patil as Bobo aka Baban: Lalita's brother who deals drugs, causing complications in his own relationships and affecting Lalita and Vinod's lives.
- Shruti Seth as Radhika Jaykar: Rishi's wife and an entrepreneur who is insecure about her husband's friendship with Farah.
- Sushant Divgikar as Tara aka Tarun: Sia's ex-lover who desires a sex change operation.
- Shernaz Patel as Benaifer Machado aka Binny: Denzel's wife and the mother of Riad and Pari. She is a home baker deeply affected by the loss of her daughter and feels neglected by her husband.
- Faisal Rashid as Riad Machado: Binny and Denzel's son, Shonali's husband, and Mini's father. He navigates single parenthood after a divorce and deals with parental expectations.
- Keneth Desai as Denzel Machado: Binny's husband, Riad and Pari's father, Rishi and Tony friend, as well as a painter who withdraws into seclusion after a personal tragedy.
- KC Shankar as Noel: Ella's father, Vinod's boss and a close friend of Tony's. He owns the casino and operates as a kingpin in the drug trafficking world.
- Chahat Vig as Sia Walia: Tony's third wife and Tara's ex-lover, who quits her acting aspirations for her husband's desires.

=== Recurring ===
- Ajay Kumar Dutta as Thomas
- Nehal Vadoliya as Seductress4u: The blackmailer on video chat with Denzel
- Aman Desai as Advait: Radhika's son and Rishi's stepchild, who is in a relationship with Ella and Anushka but is forced to leave Goa by Noel.
- Sarah Gesawat as Ella: Advait's lover and Noel's daughter.
- Danish Pandor as Mohit: He is married to Sameera and Mehnaaz. He is the father of Munmun and Sona, and he cheats on Sameera.
- Sharvari Deshpande as Chayya
- Vishal Arora as Drug peddler
- Hardika Sharma as Mini: Raid and Shonali's daughter
- Ganesh Yadav as Savio: Police inspector
- Jagdish Chavan as Mangesh: Police constable
- Ketan Karande as Rodney (Noel's bodyguard)
- Bianca Arora as Anushka: Advait's lover
- Shweta Mehta as Kleo
- Khushi Bhardwaj as Aditi: Rishi and Radhika's daughter who becomes friends with Farah.
- Sapna Rathore as Sameera: Farah's sister and Mohit's wife, and Munmun's mother who commits suicide upon learning of her husband's affair.
- Ashmara Sharma as Pari
- Payal Arora as Dr. Prabhu Desai
- Daivik Balodia & Daivat Balodia as Twins
- Smaran Sahu as Karan: An actor who stars opposite Sia in a movie and eventually falls for her.
- Palash Tiwari as Jugal (House keeping staff)
- Supriya Mishra as Rohini (House keeping staff)
- Palvi Jaswal as Shonali
- Randeep Singh as Sukhwinder watchman
- Zara Khan as Munmun
- Abhijeet Pawar as Magician
- Asha Sharma as Mehnaaz
- Urvi Upadhyay as Sona
- Darshit Lahane as Amar
- Neeva Malik as Anjali

== Episodes ==
No. in series	Title	Directed by	Written by	Original release date
1	"The Intruder's Arrival"	Vishal Furia	Anahata Menon & Seneca Mendonsa	12 July 2024
2	"Hidden Agendas"	Vishal Furia	Anahata Menon & Seneca Mendonsa	12 July 2024
3	"Beneath the Surface"	Vishal Furia	Anahata Menon & Seneca Mendonsa	12 July 2024
4	"Denzel's Dilemma: Seduced and Blackmailed"	Vishal Furia	Anahata Menon & Seneca Mendonsa	12 July 2024
5	"The Facade Cracks"	Vishal Furia	Anahata Menon & Seneca Mendonsa	12 July 2024
6	"Masked Intentions"	Vishal Furia	Anahata Menon & Seneca Mendonsa	12 July 2024
7	"Secrets Unraveled"	Vishal Furia	Anahata Menon & Seneca Mendonsa	12 July 2024
8	"The Poisoned Olive Branch"	Vishal Furia	Anahata Menon & Seneca Mendonsa	12 July 2024

== Production ==
36 Days is the Indian adaptation of the British series 35 Diwrnod, originally in Welsh, which aired from 2014 to 2017 across four seasons. The adaptation was officially undertaken by writer Anahata Menon, who collaborated with Seneca Mendonsa on the screenplay.

In October 2022, it was revealed that Sharib Hashmi, Chandan Roy Sanyal, Sushant Divgikar, Shernaz Patel, Faisal Rashid, Kenneth Desai, among others, were cast in the series. In April 2023, SonyLIV officially announced the series along with the rest of the main cast, including Neha Sharma, Purab Kohli, Shruti Seth and Amruta Khanvilkar. Child actor Zara Khan was cast in October 2023.

Sharma, who portrays the enigmatic airhostess in the series, mentioned that she watched a portion of the original BBC show 35 Diwrnod, describing it as mind-bending. Reflecting on her role, she remarked, "I don't think anyone ever expected me to portray a morally ambiguous character." Initially, Kohli was offered a different role, but due to scheduling conflicts, he had to decline it. However, a few months later, the makers approached Kohli again, this time offering him the role of Rishi. Kohli and Desai reunited after 26 years for this series; they had last worked together in the cult classic television series titled Hip Hip Hurray. Seth, who stars opposite Kohli, shared insights into their bond, saying, "Meeting after so long, we were catching up so much that our director, Vishal, had to request us to stop talking."

The main schedule of principal photography predominantly occurred in Goa, focusing on locations in North Goa, with additional scenes filmed in Mumbai. Quais Waseeq served as the cinematographer, and Abhijeet Deshpande edited the series. The musical duo Clinton Cerejo and Bianca Gomes composed the songs under the band name Shor Police.

== Soundtrack ==
The background score is composed by Roshin Balu, with sound design by Anirban Sengupta. All the songs are composed by the musical duo Shor Police, consisting of Clinton Cerejo and Bianca Gomes.

Track listing
No.	Title	Lyrics	Singer(s)	Length
1.	"Ab Tak"	Siddhant Kaushal	Sushant Divgikar	2:45
2.	"Farebi Zindagi"	Siddhant Kaushal	Sushant Divgikar	3:03
3.	"Yeh Jahaan"	Siddhant Kaushal	Sushant Divgikar	2:26
Total length:				8:14

== Release and reception ==
The makers released the trailer on 28 May 2024, featuring the main star cast. Alongside sharing the trailer, they posed a question: "There are always three sides to every story—your side, my side... and the truth. But what if the truth lies hidden behind a wall of secrets?"

=== Reception ===
The series garnered mixed reviews from critics, who lauded its performances but criticized its writing.

Archika Khurana of The Times of India reviewed the series, awarding 3.5 out of 5 stars and observed, "While the show becomes somewhat predictable midway, the unexpected twists towards the end keep it engaging. The 35-minute episodes manage to maintain a compelling pace despite the dense web of characters and their interconnected lives." Ronit Kawale for Presswire18 commented, "The screenplay is so dull that one feels like watching it in fast forward" despite the decent performances and atmospheric technical elements". Navbharat Times critic Upama Singh, giving 2 stars, praised performances, cinematography, setting, and background score, while remarking, "The screenplay is so sluggish that one feels like fast-forwarding through it. Direction lacks substance too; the initial two-three episodes lack any thrill." Deepa Gahlot of Scroll.in reviewed "The eight-part series moves at a leisurely pace. Everything that happens does not necessarily connect to the murder. The helter-skelter format is more to build suspense and comment on the corrosive effects of pretence or the damage caused by ignoring mental health issues." Risha Ganguly of Times Now, awarding 2.5 out of 5 stars, remarked, "It lacked originality and suspense," adding, "You can predict from the very first episode that the story is following a certain plot. Even the twists and turns ate so dated that you see them coming from a mile." Mitul Kansara of Tellychakkar praised it with 4 stars, stating, "All in all, this has been an amazing watch with good performances, good characters and a pace that could be improved."

Shubhra Gupta of The Indian Express mentioned, "This is an interesting ensemble, and I got pulled into all these questions which swirl around the residents.." but criticizes its excessive use of familiar tropes and a lack of sustained tension and urgency in the storytelling, giving it 2 stars. Vaibhavi Mishra of Gadgets 360 described it as "Overstretched and Predictable," commenting, "the show falls prey to the classic mistake of stuffing unnecessary tropes in thrillers, just to add more faces to point the misdirected finger at". Manik Sharma from OTTPlay observed, "There are plenty of sub-plots to chew on... Instead what we get is short shrift on a bunch of situations, without any real insight into the people dealing with them." A critic from ap7am.com rated it 2.75 out of 5, calling the screenplay "bit faster" and noting, "Although the story is told in the housing complex on the coast, it does not bore much. Photography ... background music ... editing helped this series." Riya Sharma from DNA awarded 2 out of 5 stars, criticizing its predictable plot, lack of genuine suspense, and failure to fully utilize its talented cast, stating, "The show doesn't seem to do justice to an ensemble cast who gives their all and present you with a powerful performance despite a dull, predictable and boring storyline." Critic Simran Kumari of Cinetales gave it 3 out of 5 stars, praising the performances as the "highlight" and summarizing, "...the twists in the narrative also seem quite predictable except for the last few. Therefore, you won't feel the relief at the end since there's no proper build-up."

Shatakshi Ganguly of IWMBuzz criticized the series for faltering despite its promising premise and talented cast, pointing out overindulgence, disjointed storytelling, and a lack of suspense or satisfying payoff, noting, "The sheer volume of characters dilutes the impact of the story, leaving viewers grappling with an ensemble cast that ultimately feels wasted." In contrast, Troy Ribeiro of The Free Press Journal rated it 3 out of 5 stars, highlighting intricate character development and a slow-burn mystery set in Goa's serene backdrop, stating, "The pacing, initially leisurely as a Sunday morning in Goa, might test the patience of those accustomed to breakneck thrillers." Leisure Byte reviewer Archi Sengupta commented, "36 Days has its moments that will arrest you thoroughly, especially as you try to decipher who could've murdered Farah. However, the series isn't able to balance its many storylines, ending in the last episode becoming sort of an exposition dump rushing towards concluding everything quickly." Ravi Sharma of Bollywood Helpline gave 2.5 stars and wrote, "36 Days may appeal to fans of murder mysteries and ensemble dramas, but its shortcomings in narrative execution and pacing prevent it from achieving greatness."
