= Drama Juniors (game show) =

Marathi language reality show

- Genre: Reality
- Presented by: Shreya Bugde
- Judges: Amruta Khanvilkar; Sankarshan Karhade
- Country of origin: India
- Original language: Marathi
- No. of episodes: 36

Production
- Camera setup: Multi-camera
- Running time: 45 minutes
- Production company: Full Screen Entertainment

Original release
- Network: Zee Marathi
- Release: 22 June – 20 October 2024

Related
- India's Best Dramebaaz

Drama Juniors is an Indian Marathi language talent search reality television show which aired on Zee Marathi. This show features drama skit performances by children aged 2 to 14. It is judged by Amruta Khanvilkar and Sankarshan Karhade and hosted by Shreya Bugde.

The show was announced in December 2023 on Zee Marathi's social media handles, along with two other fiction series. In early June 2024, a promotional announcement featuring Khanvilkar, Karhade, Bugde, and a few child actors was launched. The series premiered with the Mega Auditions on 22 June 2024.

== Concept ==
The show format is a talent competition designed to discover and nurture young drama enthusiasts. Featuring a series of acts, it tests the participants' creativity, spontaneity, and acting skills. This showcase highlights the talents of child actors, with performances that encompass acting, dancing, and various performing arts.

== Contestant ==
Contestants	Age	Hometown	Result
Arjun Chougule	12	Kolhapur	Winner
Shivansh Chorghe	8	Parel, Mumbai	1st Runner Up
Swara Mendgule	8	Sangli	2nd Runner Up
Vanshika Sawant	11	Bhandup, Mumbai	2nd Runner Up
Savi Mudrale	9	Kasarde, Kankavli	Eliminated
Adhya Shirgaonkar	5	Sangameshwar, Ratnagiri	Eliminated
Arnav	12	Pimpalgaon, Beed	Eliminated
Ira Tambe	3	Girgaon, Mumbai	Eliminated
Mahi Sasane	8	Ahmedpur, Latur	Eliminated
Arav Aair	8	Kudal, Sindhudurg	Eliminated
Hridan Urunkar	5	Sangli	Eliminated
Vihan Shedge	11	Bhugaon, Pune	Eliminated
Yash Wakale	12	Amravati	Eliminated
Netra Shitole	9	Shirur, Pune	Eliminated
Tanmay More	9	Malegaon, Nashik	Eliminated
Vedanti Bhosale	4	Satara	Eliminated
Durv Dalvi	9	Byculla, Mumbai	Eliminated
Shubra Tilgulkar	9	Badlapur, Thane	Eliminated
