= Uday Tikekar =

Indian film and television actor (born 1960)

- Born: 3 December 1960 (age 65); Mumbai, Maharashtra, India
- Education: Parle Tilak Vidyalaya Marathi Medium Secondary School, University of Mumbai
- Occupation: Actor
- Years active: 1988–present
- Spouse: Arati Ankalikar-Tikekar (m. 1985)
- Children: Swanandi Tikekar

Uday Tikekar (born 3 December 1960) is an Indian film and television actor. He began his career in Marathi theatre, also putting up performances in Hindi theatre. He is married to classical singer Arati Ankalikar-Tikekar, who is a 2-time National Film Award winner. He has appeared in movies including Raees and Madaari, as well as starring in Hindi serials like Kasautii Zindagii Kay, Krishnadasi and Bhagya Lakshmi.

== Personal life ==
He is married to classical singer Arati Ankalikar Tikekar. The couple have a daughter Swanandi Tikekar, who is also an actress.

== Filmography ==
Year	Title	Language
1986	Dhakti Sun	Marathi
1988	Rangat Sangat	Marathi
1990	Prakop	Marathi
1990	Kaafila	Hindi
1992	Shubh Mangal Savdhan	Marathi
1993	Shivrayachi Sun Tararani	Marathi
1993	Game	Hindi
2000	Baaghi	Hindi
2002	Lal Salaam	Hindi
2004	Murder	Hindi
2004	Saatchya Aat Gharat	Marathi
2004	Tumsa Nahin Dekha	Hindi
2007	Saade Maade Teen	Marathi
2009	Anolakhi He Ghar Majhe	Marathi
2009	Gaiir	Marathi
2010	Vroom	Hindi
2011	Arjun	Marathi
2012	Satrangi Re	Marathi
2012	Barfi!	Hindi
2013	Govinda	Marathi
2013	Kho-Kho	Marathi
2014	Lai Bhaari	Marathi
2015	Aawhan	Marathi
2016	Rocky Handsome	Hindi
2016	Madaari	Hindi
2016	Vrundavan	Marathi
2016	Prem Kahani Ek Lapleli Ghoshta	Marathi
2017	Raees	Hindi
2017	Golmaal Again	Hindi
2017	Bus Stop	Marathi
2018	Double Game	Hindi
2018	Simmba	Hindi
2018	Me Shivaji Park	Marathi
2020	Ajinkya	
2021	Sooryavanshi	Hindi
2022	Cirkus	Hindi
2023	Surya	Marathi
2024	KarmaVirayan	Marathi
2024	Cocaine (Bollywood film)	Hindi
2025	Tu Bol Na	Marathi
2026	Cocaine	Hindi

== Television ==
Year	Serial	Role	Channel
2000–2002	Koshish – Ek Aashaa	Neeraj's father	Zee TV
2001	Manzilein Apani Apani	Dinesh Roy	Zee TV
2001–2003	Kohi Apna Sa	Vikram Gill	Zee TV
2004–2005	Ayushmaan	Mr. Jaiswal	Sony Entertainment Television
2005	Oon Paus	Padmakar Sardesai	Zee Marathi
2008-2010	Agnihotra	Shripad Vinayak Agnihotri	Star Pravah
2009–2011	Man Udhan Varyache	Avinash Mohite	Star Pravah
2013–2016	Durva	Devkishan Sarda	Star Pravah
2013–2015	Julun Yeti Reshimgathi	Suresh Kudalkar	Zee Marathi
2016	Krishnadasi	Pradyumna Rao	Colors TV
2017	Dil Dosti Dobara	Captain Cook	Zee Marathi
2017–2018	Tuza Maza Breakup	Sharad Desai	Zee Marathi
2018–2020	Kasautii Zindagii Kay	Moloy Basu	Star Plus
2019	Jeevlaga	Vinod	Star Pravah
2019–2021	Jeev Zala Yedapisa	Yashwant Lashkare	Colors Marathi
2020–2021	Jigarbaaz		Sony Marathi
2021-2023	Bhagya Lakshmi	Virendra Oberoi	Zee TV
2022	Aboli	D.C.P. Kiran Kulkarni	Star Pravah
2023	Thipkyanchi Rangoli	Vinayak Kantikar	Star Pravah
2026	Hey Kay Navin?	Rama's Father	ZEE5
