= Bus Stop (2017 film) =

- Directed by: Sameer Hemant Joshi
- Produced by: Shreyash Jadhav; Poonam Shende; Gajendra Patil; Asoo Nihlani
- Starring: Amruta Khanvilkar; Aniket Vishwasrao; Hemant Dhome; Siddharth Chandekar; Pooja Sawant
- Cinematography: Abhijit D. Abde
- Edited by: Apurwa Motiwale Sahai; Ashish Mhatre
- Music by: Saurabh; Jasraj; Hrushikesh
- Release date: 21 July 2017
- Country: India
- Language: Marathi

Bus Stop is an Indian Marathi language film directed by Sameer Hemant Joshi. The film stars Amruta Khanvilkar, Aniket Vishwasrao, Hemant Dhome, Siddharth Chandekar, Pooja Sawant and Rasika Sunil. Music by Saurabh, Jasraj and Hrushikesh. The film was released on 21 July 2017.

== Synopsis ==
The lives of a group of students, their friendships, relationships, and everyday issues. The friends are all from different backgrounds and want different things in life but each has a complicated relationship with their parents.

== Cast ==
- Amruta Khanvilkar as Sharayu
- Aniket Vishwasrao as Deven
- Hemant Dhome as Keshav
- Siddharth Chandekar as Vineet
- Pooja Sawant as Anushka
- Suyog Gorhe as Sumedh
- Rasika Sunil as Maithili
- Akshay Waghmare as Abhishek
- Madhura Deshpande as Radhika
- Avinash Narkar
- Sanjay Mone
- Sharad Ponkshe
- Uday Tikekar
- Vidyadhar
- Seema Chandekar
- 'Manjusha Godse
- Adhashree Atre

== Soundtrack ==
Bus Stop

Soundtrack album by Saurabh, Jasraj and Hrushikesh
- Released: 2017
- Recorded: 2017
- Genre: Feature film soundtrack
- Length: 14:03
- Language: Marathi

Official audio
- Bus Stop – Full Album on YouTube

Track listing
| No. | Title | Singer(s) | Length |
|---|---|---|---|
| 1. | "Move On" | Rohit Raut | 4:03 |
| 2. | "Aapla Romance" | Shruti Athavale, Jasraj Joshi | 5:40 |
| 3. | "Ghoka Nahitar Hoel Dhoka" | Sagar phadke | 2:54 |
| 4. | "Tujhya Saavalila " | Rupali Moghe | 2:08 |
| Total length: | | | 14:03 |

== Critical reception ==
Bus Stop film received negative reviews from critics. Ganesh Matkari of Pune Mirror says "There is some attempt to address the generation gap issue (nothing new there as well), but that comes much later in the film, and with little or no consistency. Apparently, the film’s title is a metaphor, but it remains unexplained. Although it did remind me of all the places buses could take me to if I could get up and leave". Keyur Seta of Cinestaan.com Wrote "Overall, you would be well advised to skip this Bus Stop". Swati vemul of Loksatta wrote" Overall, 'Bus Stop' feels lost due to the misalignment of the story, clumsiness, a few drawn-out shots and an incomplete ending". Ibrahim Afghan of Maharashtra Times wrote "The absurdity of this film makes you laugh out loud. So how can you say that this film does not entertain?". Raj Chinchankar of Lokmat wrote "If there are not many expectations, it can be given up at once; But despite the best team of artists in the Marathi film industry, nothing is coming out of this film, but the great sadness of the disappointment caused by this film is painful".
