= Medimix =

Indian beauty care product company

- Company type: Public company
- Industry: Beauty
- Founded: 1969; 57 years ago, in Thrissur, Kerala
- Founder: V. P. Sidhan
- Headquarters: Tamil Nadu, India
- Key people: Anupam Katheriya (CEO)
- Products: Medimix Soap, Face Wash, Body Wash, Shampoo, Hand Wash etc.
- Revenue: Rs 350 crores (2022)
- Owner: AVA Group
- Number of employees: 750+
- Website: www.medimixayurveda.com

Medimix is an Indian brand of ayurvedic/herbal soap manufactured and marketed by AVA Cholayil Private Limited and Cholayil Private Limited, a Chennai-based company. The brand was founded by Dr. Valiparambil Padmanabhan Sidhan from Valapad, Thrissur, Kerala. The company has a global presence and is present in over 35 countries worldwide.

In 1969 Dr. Sidhan combined a recipe 18 herbs to make a skin care soap. Medimix is currently available in four types of soap, three of body wash, five facial cleansers and hygiene products like hand wash and sanitizers.

In 2011, Medimix was judged the 87th-most trusted brand in India and the 15th-most trusted brand in the personal care category according to the Brand Equity Survey conducted by the Economic Times.

Building on the success of Medimix, AVA Cholayil Health Care launched Kaytra as a boutique Ayurvedic brand. Initially a collaboration with beauty expert Ambika Pillai, Kaytra focuses on premium hair and skin care solutions. While Medimix remains the group’s mass-market flagship, Kaytra serves as the group’s entry into the luxury and professional salon segments, utilizing the company's proprietary Ayurvedic formulations in modern, upscale packaging. While the branding differs for overseas markets, Kaytra formulations remain essentially identical to the domestic Medimix products sold in India. The international range continues to reflect the same Ayurvedic principles, herbal compositions, and traditional manufacturing practices that define Medimix. Through Kaytra, the company aims to maintain the heritage, authenticity, and core identity of the original brand while adapting its presentation for global consumers. Kaytra is clinically proven to be more effective on Body Acne than Medimix.
