= Welcome Zindagi =

- Title Look Poster
- Directed by: Umesh Ghadge
- Written by: Ganesh Matkari; Srijit Mukherji
- Screenplay by: Ganesh Matkari
- Story by: Srijit Mukherji
- Based on: Hemlock Society by Srijit Mukherji
- Produced by: Ajit Satam; Sanjay Ahluwalia; Bibhas Chhaya
- Starring: Swapnil Joshi; Amruta Khanvilkar
- Cinematography: Prasad Bhende
- Edited by: Pranav Mistry
- Music by: Amitraj; Pankaj Padghan; Soumil-Siddarth
- Production company: Rupali Entertainment
- Release date: 26 June 2015
- Running time: 135 minutes
- Country: India
- Language: Marathi

Welcome Zindagi (Marathi: वेलकम जिंदगी) is a Marathi language film. The film is a dark comedy about a girl who wants to end it all, and a boy who will change her perception of life. The movie is a dark comedy about life and death. The film is a remake of successful Bengali language film, Hemlock Society, which starred Koel Mallick and Parambrata Chatterjee in lead roles.

== Plot ==
Meera, a young media professional, finds herself cornered every step of the way, as she tries to live a normal life. She feels ignored by her father, betrayed by her fiancé, faces trouble at work. The only escape route she can think of, is taking her own life with a massive dose of sleeping pills.

Enters Anand Prabhu, who stops her at a crucial moment, although he has no plans of making her change her mind. His advice instead, is to go about it systematically. Anand is the founder of ‘Happy Ending Society’, an organization that believes that every person has a right to decide his, or her own fate. Anand gladly offers to make Meera an expert in various ways of ending her life by enrolling her in a 3-day suicide camp, organized by Happy Ending.

While Meera is busy making a choice between life and death surrounded by the like-minded students and over enthusiastic staff, Meera’s father Dr Rajwade leaves no stone unturned to find his estranged daughter.

What happens next? Will Meera finally succeed in carrying out her wish? Does Anand have an ulterior motive in keeping Meera at the Suicide camp? Will Meera reunite with her father? And what is the truth behind ‘Happy Ending Society’?

Walking a thin line between comedy and drama, Welcome Zindagi delivers a poignant message in the garb of entertainment.

== Cast ==
- Swapnil Joshi as Anand Prabhu
- Amruta Khanvilkar as Meera Sabnis
- Ashmita Kaur as Priyanka
- Mohan Agashe as Colonel Vagaskar
- Satish Alekar as Prof. Verulkar
- Prashant Damle as Prashant
- Bharti Achrekar as Prof. Dolkar
- Rajeshwari Sachdev as Seema Rajwade
- Vivek Lagoo as Suhas Rajwade
- Pushkar Shrotri as Prof. Mankame
- Murli Sharma as Prof. Setumaharshi
- Urmilla Kothare as Manisha
- Jayant Wadkar as Inspector Jadhav
- Jay Shringarpure as Shantanu
- Aditi Yevale as Neha
- Mahesh Manjrekar as Prof. Shikharkhane (special appearance)

== Soundtrack ==
No.	Title	Singer(s)	Length
1.	"Jaguni Ghe Zara"	Harshavardhan Wavare,	4:31
2.	"Welcome Zindagi"	Avadhoot Gupte, Varun Likhate
3.	"Life Ka Funda"	Jaydeep Bhgwarkar
4.	"Suna Suna"	Mahalakshmi Iyer
