= Autograph (2023 film) =

Autograph – Ek Japun Thevavi Ashi Lovestory
- Television release poster
- Directed by: Satish Rajwade
- Screenplay by: Ashwini Shende Bagwadkar; Satish Rajwade
- Story by: Cheran (uncredited); Satish Rajwade
- Produced by: Sanjay Chhabria, Ashwin Anchan
- Starring: Ankush Chaudhari; Amruta Khanvilkar; Urmilla Kothare; Manasi Moghe
- Cinematography: Suhas Gujarathi
- Edited by: Faisal Mahadik
- Production companies: Everest Entertainment; STV Networks
- Distributed by: Star Pravah
- Release date: 14 May 2023
- Country: India
- Language: Marathi

Autograph – Ek Japun Thevavi Ashi Lovestory (transl. Autograph – A love story to be preserved), also known as Autograph, is a 2023 Indian Marathi-language Romantic Drama film directed by Satish Rajwade and produced by Sanjay Chhabria and Ashwin Anchan under the banners of Everest Entertainment and STV Networks. A remake of the Tamil film Autograph (2004), it stars Ankush Chaudhari, Amruta Khanvilkar, Urmila Kothare, and Manasi Moghe in the lead roles. The story of the film is a unique perspective on relationships, heartbreaks, and the memories that are worth treasuring throughout life.

The film released directly on television for the Star Pravah channel on 14 May 2023, prior to its theatrical or OTT release.

== Cast ==
- Ankush Chaudhari as Samar
- Amruta Khanvilkar as Julia
- Urmila Kothare as Saavni
- Manasi Moghe as Anushka
- Tanvi Malpekar
- Mangala Kenkre

== Production ==
The film was officially announced on 18 July 2022, with the release of a motion poster.

This is Chaudhari and Rajwade's third collaboration; they previously collaborated on Gaiir and Ti Saddhya Kay Karte. Khanvilkar was then a part of Gaiir, while Kothare was a part of Ti Saddhya Kay Karte.

== Soundtrack ==
Track listing
No.	Title	Lyrics	Music	Singer(s)	Length
1.	"Ogha Oghani"	Abhishek khankar	Hrishikesh Saurabh Jasraj	Jasraj Jayant Joshi; Aanandi Joshi	3:00
2.	"Adhure Adhure"	Trupti Garad	Mandar Apte	Mandar Apte	2:58
3.	"Premat Aahe Me"	Kshitij Patwardhan	Troy Arif	Harshavardhan Wavre; Jyotsna Navandar	2:33
4.	"Tulach Disate"	Kshitij Patwardhan	Hrishikesh Saurabh Jasraj	Hrishikesh Ranade	3:15
Total length:					11:46

== Release ==
The film was set to be released in theatres on 30 December 2022, alongside Riteish Deshmukh's Ved. The film's release date was postponed for unknown reasons. The film released directly on television for the Star Pravah channel on 14 May 2023, prior to its theatrical or OTT release.

== Accolades ==
Award	Year	Category	Recipient(s)	Result	Ref.
Fakt Marathi Cine Sanman	2023	Best Actor in a Lead Role	Ankush Chaudhari	Nominated	
Fakt Marathi Cine Sanman	2023	Best Actress in a Lead Role	Amruta Khanvilkar	Nominated	
Fakt Marathi Cine Sanman	2023	Best Actress in a Supporting Role	Urmila Kothare	Nominated	
MaTa Sanman	2024	Best Lyricist	Trupti Garad (for song "Adhure Adhure")	Nominated	
MaTa Sanman	2024	Best Male Playback Singer	Mandar Apte (for song "Adhure Adhure")	Nominated	
MaTa Sanman	2024	Best Art Director	Ajit Dandekar	Nominated	
Sanskruti Kaladarpan	2024	Best Actor	Ankush Chaudhari	Nominated	
Sanskruti Kaladarpan	2024	Best Actress	Amruta Khanvilkar	Nominated	
Sanskruti Kaladarpan	2024	Best Supporting Actress	Urmila Kothare	Nominated	
Sanskruti Kaladarpan	2024	Best Editing	Faisal Mahadik, Imran Mahadik	Nominated	
Sanskruti Kaladarpan	2024	Best Cinematographer	Suhas Gujarathi	Nominated	
Sanskruti Kaladarpan	2024	Best Male Playback Singer	Mandar Apte (for song "Adhure Adhure")	Nominated	
Sanskruti Kaladarpan	2024	Best Lyricist	Trupti Garad (for song "Adhure Adhure")	Nominated	
International Iconic Awards Marathi	2024	Best Actor	Ankush Choudhari	Won	
