= Video Cam Scam =

2024 Indian Series

- Promotional poster
- Genre: Thriller; Crime; Drama
- Created by: Pavan Malu
- Screenplay by: Pavan Malu; Arpit Vageria; Dialogues: Arpit Vageria
- Directed by: Vaibhav Khisti
- Starring: Rajneesh Duggal; Amruta Khanvilkar; Farnaz Shetty; Kunj Anand; Aradhana Sharma; Rahul Singh; Pritam Singh
- Music by: Geet Vani; Reenam Jain
- Country of origin: India
- Original language: Hindi
- No. of seasons: 1
- No. of episodes: 6

Production
- Executive producer: Swapnil Bhangale
- Producer: Pavan Malu
- Cinematography: Amey V. Chavan
- Editor: Ramesh Naidu
- Running time: 26–31 minutes
- Production company: Blue Drop Films

Original release
- Network: Epic On
- Release: 12 January 2024

Video Cam Scam is a 2024 Indian Hindi-language crime thriller streaming television series directed by Vaibhav Khisti for Epic On. It stars Rajneesh Duggal and Amruta Khanvilkar in lead roles, along with Farnaz Shetty, Kunj Anand and Aradhana Sharma in pivotal roles. The series is produced by Blue Drop Films and In10Media Pvt. Ltd. The series is based on real-life events about cybercrime and sextortion.

The series premiered on 12 January 2024, on Epic On.

== Premise ==
The sextortion scam in which Vinay Kumar, an honest 35-year-old police sub-inspector, inadvertently falls prey to the video calling app by Sonu, Tittu, and Sweety, and how his life goes haywire in a snap of a finger. Concerning his wife and family's respect for him and his long-standing reputation, he worries about these things. Despite the challenging times the couple has gone through, his wife plays an important role in identifying the people behind these frauds.

== Cast ==
=== Main ===
- Rajneesh Duggal as Vinay Kumar
- Amruta Khanvilkar as Priya Kumar
- Kunj Anand as Tittu
- Farnaz Shetty as Sweety
- Aradhana Sharma as Sonu
- Rahul Singh as Ajay Singh
- Pritam Singh as Gupta Ji
- Mehul Buch as Vinod Kumar
- Shubhangi Latkar as Poonam Kumar
- Hansika Jangid as Shreya Kumar

=== Recurring ===
- Jitendra Kumar as Babbulal
- Vignesh Pande as News anchor
- Sonali Jhariya as Sakina Khan
- Kapil Yashraj as Jeweller
- Khem Prasad as Nepali watchman
- Noor Mohammad Solanki as Old man
- Deepak Rawat as Smith
- Shyam Jethani as Massage parlour owner
- Vipul Verma as Joseph
- Amit Jat as Corporate employee
- Swapnil Srivastav as Monty
- Aadarash Chaurasiya as Kanpuriya boy

== Production ==
Principal photography took place from May until July 2023. The primary locations for the shooting of the series included Indore and Mumbai.

== Soundtrack ==
No.	Title	Lyrics	Music	Singer(s)	Length
1.	"Raaton ka Nasha"	Geet Vani, Pavan Malu	Geet Vani	Chetna Bhardwaj	1:18
2.	"Money Waar"	Geet Vani, Pavan Malu	Geet Vani	Geet Vani, Mansi Bhardwaj	0:59
Total length:					2:17

== Release ==
In July 2023, Epic On announced the series officially. The trailer was released on 28 December 2023. The series released on 12 January 2024.

Within a month, the series surpassed 100 million streams.
