= Phoonk 2 =

- Theatrical release poster
- Directed by: Milind Gadagkar
- Written by: Milind Gadagkar
- Produced by: Prashant Burra; P. Chandra Shekar
- Starring: Sudeep; Amruta Khanvilkar; Ahsaas Channa; Amit Sadh; Neeru Bajwa; Ashwini Kalsekar
- Music by: Dharmaraj Bhatt; Sandeep Patil
- Release date: 16 April 2010
- Running time: 106 minutes
- Country: India
- Language: Hindi
- Budget: ₹ 8 crores
- Box office: ₹ 9.24 crores

Phoonk 2 (transl. Blow 2) is a 2010 Indian horror film written and directed by Milind Gadagkar in his directorial debut. It is a sequel to Ram Gopal Varma's 2008 film Phoonk (also written by Gadagkar) and stars Sudeep, Amruta Khanvilkar and Ahsaas Channa. The film was released on 16 April 2010 with about 900 prints worldwide including the digital format. The film was also dubbed and released in Tamil as Bommai 2 and in Telugu as Aavaham. The film flopped at the box office.

== Plot ==
On winning a new construction project, Rajiv moves with his family to a new place, one that is both close to the woods and the beach. Rajiv's mother has gone to Rishikesh, so he stays there only with his wife Aarti, two kids, and housemaid Laxmi. Rajiv's kids, Raksha and Rohan, begin exploring the new place and the surroundings – the lonely beach and then the woods behind the house. They are soon visited by Rajiv's sister Arushi and her husband Ranjit aka Ronnie, who have come to spend time with the family.

The terror begins when Raksha and Rohan find a doll in the woods and bring it home. It happens to be a doll controlled by the ghost of Madhu, who has now returned from the dead to take revenge on Rajiv. It then progresses to a series of highly traumatizing experiences for the whole family. Madhu enters Aarti, and she begins to act weirdly. Rajiv soon realizes that Madhu has returned from the grave and wants revenge.

Manja, the exorcist who had killed Madhu, meets a gruesome death at the hands of her ghost. Advised by his friend Vinay, who helped eliminate Madhu before, Rajiv now approaches another exorcist, Jeeva, but he is not of much help. He advises Rajiv to leave the city and go someplace where Madhu cannot reach him, also telling Rajiv and Vinay to find Anshuman, Madhu's husband (from the previous film). Vinay tries to find Anshuman but is killed in a road accident after he sees Madhu's spirit. Eventually, Jeeva is also killed by Madhu's possessed doll, but not before he manages to burn it.

Now the grotesque killings begin. The watchman and Laxmi are murdered brutally, Arushi is drowned in the swimming pool of the house, and Aarti, possessed by Madhu's spirit, acts weirdly. Rajiv is left alone with his two children at home, and Aarti (Madhu) begins to traumatize them from all directions. Rohan and Ronnie are trapped in their room, with no way to help. The ghost attacks Rajiv and Raksha and stabs Rajiv. It then moves to kill Raksha, with a wounded and helpless Rajiv trying his best to protect her in the heavy rain. Finally, they reach the terrace, where Rajiv attacks Aarti and pushes her off the rooftop, and she falls to her death. Rajiv carries Aarti into the house, with a grieving Raksha, Rohan, and Ronnie, leaving the movie with an open ending.

== Cast ==
- Sudeep as Rajiv (voice dubbed by Rajesh Khattar)
- Amruta Khanvilkar as Aarti
- Amit Sadh as Ronnie
- Ahsaas Channa as Raksha
- Rishabh Jain as Rohan
- Anu Ansari as Lakshmi
- Ashwini Kalsekar as Madhu
- Neeru Bajwa as Arushi
- Ganesh Yadav as Vinay
- Zakir Hussain as Manja
- Vikas Shrivastav as Balu
- Rakesh Raj as Property Agent
- Chyan Trivedi as Goswami
- Jeeva as Exorcist
- Dhiraj Regmi as Exorcist #2

== Release ==
=== Marketing ===
A poster for the film was found to be sharing similarities with that of the 2008 South Korean action thriller The Chaser.

Varma claimed that Phoonk 2 was scarier than Phoonk, and announced a contest where a fearless viewer will be shown the film in a theatre alone while being attached to an ECG machine connected to a screen outside the hall. If the heartbeat stays normal, the viewer wins ₹ 500,000.

The person who dared to watch Phoonk 2 alone was Hitesh Sharma from Mumbai. The contest was held at FAME Cinemas. The contestant lost the contest. After the contest Varma told reporters that "The bottom line is the challenger has lost and we won. I am very happy". There were screens outside the hall to monitor his heartbeats and facial expression. After watching the film for 45 minutes, Hitesh took away his face from the screen and waved saying he couldn't take the scares anymore. "There were many scenes, which were really scary but I was controlling myself. Then came a scene which I couldn't bear any more, so I gave up."

Varma offered Hitesh to work with him in Phoonk 3. "I am very happy to be a part for Ramu’s Phoonk 3. I have just learned that he has offered me a role. Nothing was planned. I got scared and I feel Ramu is right when he says "My film is scarier", Hitesh added.

== Reception ==
=== Critical reception ===
lvis D Silva of Rediff quoted as "too much noise" and gave 2.5/5. Sonia Chopra of sify.com gave 2.5/5 and said "Phoonk 2 starts off being scarier and bloodier than the first film, but ends up conforming to the regular horror fare complete with spirit possessions and the white-eyed ghost.". Nikhat Kazmi of THE TIMES OF INDIA said "Phoonk 2 is just another run-of-the-mill horror film and doesn't do anything to lift the genre to another level altogether" and gave 2.5/5. Anupam Chopra of NDTV gave 2/5 and said that "There are a few fun moments here – the tantrik who messed with Madhu in the first film loses his head, literally. But mostly Phoonk 2 is all tease and no pay-off". Rajeev Masand of CNN IBN gave 2/5 and said "Phoonk 2 is not scary enough". Taran Adarsh gave 1.5/5.

=== Box office ===
The film collected 6,86,00,000 in 3 weeks. The boxofficeindia.com has termed that film as a 'theatrically flop' despite the collection being surpassed the budget of 4 crores that is because the film was released with a huge number of prints and the occupancy in the theatre was only 50%. The site also mentioned that the film also made business through satellite rights, thus recovering the costs of the producers. It was aired on ZEE Cinema in 2016.
