= F. M. Ilyas =

Indian film director

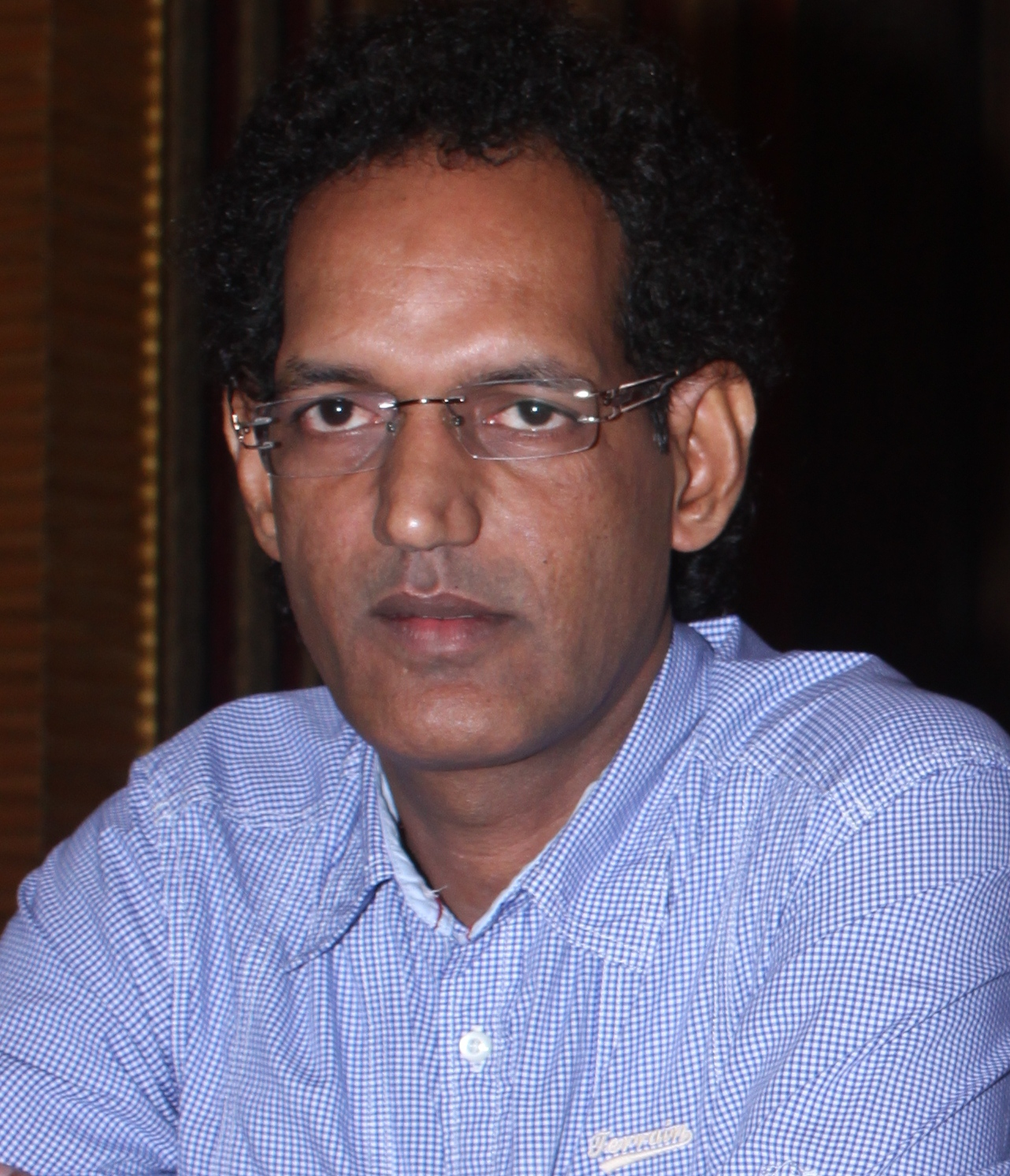
- Director picture
- Occupations: Film director, screenwriter, producer
- Years active: 2011–present

F. M. Ilyas is an Indian film director, screenwriter, and producer who is best known for Arjun.

== Personal life ==
F M Ilyas always wanted to be a writer and director. His school teacher, Qasim Shaikh, a classical music listener, master of English literature, and Hollywood film buff, encouraged Ilyas toward his career in cinema.

Originally from Khed, District Ratnagiri, from Maharashtra, he was born and brought up in a Marathi Muslim family in Kalwa, located in Thane district. His father was employed in Mumbai Port Trust. Schooled at Kalwa-Thane, he later joined Akbar Peerbhoy College to complete higher secondary education studies. He completed his course in interior design and teamed up with his brother to offer interior and decoration services to events like marriages and festivals. He later on did small businesses but was eagerly waiting for an opportunity to work in the film industry. Eventually he started his own entertainment company, Cinematics.

== Career ==
Arjun was his debut film. His current biopic Marathi feature film is Bhai Kotwal ( भाई कोतवाल ), the social reformer and militant freedom fighter from Karjat, Maharashtra, India. It is scheduled for release in 2015

== Filmography ==
- Arjun
- Bhai Kotwal
