= F. M. Bailey =

F. M. Bailey may refer to:

- Frederick Manson Bailey (1827–1915), Australian botanist
- Frederick Marshman Bailey (1882–1967), British soldier and explorer

== See also ==
- Bailey (surname)
