= Damaged (TV series) =

- Genre: Crime; Conspiracy; Thriller; Mystery
- Written by: Shreyes Lowlekar (Seaseon 1-2); Vrushank Juneja (Season 3)
- Directed by: Aarambhh M Singh (Season 1); Ekant Babani (Season 2-3)
- Starring: Amruta Khanvilkar; Amit Sial; Shruti Ulfat; Dhruvaditya Bhagwanani; Hina Khan; Adhyayan Suman; Aamna Sharif; Shrenu Parikh
- Country of origin: India
- Original language: Hindi
- No. of seasons: 3
- No. of episodes: 26

Production
- Executive producers: Sanjeev Lamba; Neeraj Roy; Siddhartha Roy; Abhishek Rege (Season 3); Gaurav Ghokhale (Season 3); Trevellyn Fynn (Season 3); Harish Shah(Season 3)
- Producers: Ekant Babani; Satya Mahapatra; Farhan Sayed
- Production location: Mumbai
- Cinematography: Abhishek Modak
- Editors: Amit Parmar (Season 1); Ambar Vyas (Season 1–2–3)
- Running time: 15–25 minutes
- Production companies: Alligator Media Productions (Season 1-2); Endemol Shine India (Season 3)

Original release
- Network: Hungama Play
- Release: 6 June 2018 – 20 January 2022

Damaged is an Indian mystery crime thriller streaming television series created for Hungama Play. The first two seasons are written by Shreyes Lowlekar and produced under the banner Alligator Media Productions, while the third season is written by Vrushank Juneja and produced under Endelmol Shine India. The series is a psychological crime drama noted for being led by a strong female character in each season. In the first season, the main cast features Amruta Khanvilkar, Amit Sial, Shruti Ulfat and Dhruvaditya Bhagwanani. In the second season, Hina Khan and Adhyayan Suman featured in lead roles, whereas the third season was led by Aamna Sharif and Shrenu Parikh.

The series was filmed across Mumbai. Abhishek Modak served as the cinematographer, and Ambar K. Vyas edited the series.

The first season of Damaged was released on 6 June 2018. The series opened to positive responses from audiences and critics, praising the performances of cast members, particularly Amruta Khanvilkar's, which received rave responses. The second season was released on 14 January 2020 and the third season of the show was released on 20 January 2022.

== Overview ==
=== Season 1 ===
The story begins with the disappearance of a famous painter. Soon the cops realise that his case is just the tip of the iceberg; there are numerous other young men who have gone missing and have never resurfaced. Investigations start, and a suspect emerges: Lovina Berdie. This turns into an intriguing cat-and-mouse game between Lovina and the police, led by Abhay.

=== Season 2 ===
Gauri Batra and Akash Batra run a homestay together. While all may seem idyllic in their beautiful guest house, things begin to unravel when a little girl staying at the homestay goes missing. Investigations begin, suspects emerge, and it is soon learned that the disappearance is not an isolated event. As the prime suspects, Gauri and Akash's twisted lives come under the scanner, and their secrets soon become public.

=== Season 3 ===
A story of two strikingly different personalities who admire each other's persona and develop friendship, but it turns against them when the friendship is taken for granted. Their hurt egos make them destroy each other's public image and unknowingly harm innocent lives, pulling out their damaged selves, which were developed by their dark and layered past.

== Cast ==
=== Season 1 ===
==== Main ====
- Amruta Khanvilkar as Lovina Berdie, the lady serial killer
- Amit Sial as CBI Inspector Abhay Singh Parihaar
- Shruti Ulfat as Inspector Meenaxi Reddy
- Dhruvaditya Bhagwanani as CBI Sub-inspector Dhruv Mullick
- Shreyes Lowlekar as CBI Inspector Dhawre

==== Recurring ====
- Anil Mange as Neil Bhatt, the stalker
- Ajit Shidhaye as Bikram Roy
- Amit Gaur as Apurva
- Auroshikha Dey as Mandira Parihaar
- Suyash Joshi as CBI Inspector Muskaan
- Karim Hajee as Father Patrick
- Kundan Kumar as Wardboy
- Vikas Kumar as Informer
- Rohan Shah as Rohan

=== Season 2 ===
==== Main ====
- Hina Khan as Gauri Batra
- Adhyayan Suman as Akash Batra

==== Recurring ====
- Leysan Karimova as Giselle
- Rahul Singh as Deshraj Duggal
- Sapan Gulati as Manav Sabharwal
- Shreyes Lowlekar as Sattu
- Aakansha Kadre as Poorva Damle
- Sachin Parikh
- Anjana Nathan

=== Season 3 ===
==== Main ====
- Aamna Sharif as DSP Rashmi Singh
- Shrenu Parikh as Shanaya Roy

==== Recurring ====
- Pulkit Bangia as Rehaan
- Vibhuti Upadhyay as Golu
- Yash Bhatia as Aayush
- Arjun Aman as Jayesh Damle
- Akshay Dandekar as Lawyer Bhatia

== Episodes ==
Series	Episodes	Originally released
1	15	6 June 2018
2	6	14 January 2020
3	5	20 January 2022

=== Season 1 ===
No. overall	No. in series	Title	Directed by	Written by	Original release date
1	1	"The Wall"	Aarambhh M Singh	Shreyes Lowlekar	6 June 2018
A case of a missing famous painter is handed over to C.B.I. who is secretly buried in a wall by a beautiful baker.
2	2	"The Victim"	Aarambhh M Singh	Shreyes Lowlekar	6 June 2018
An Urdu poet falls prey to a revengeful baker, while Crime Bureau of Investigation interrogates the key suspects of missing painter's case.
3	3	"The Trust"	Aarambhh M Singh	Shreyes Lowlekar	6 June 2018
Another case of a missing writer is handed over to CBI, while Lovina birdie gathers trust among her close people.
4	4	"The Pattern"	Aarambhh M Singh	Shreyes Lowlekar	6 June 2018
Dhruv Mullick solves a pattern of missing people, while Lovina destroys everything given to her by her ex-boyfriends.
5	5	"The Backstory"	Aarambhh M Singh	Shreyes Lowlekar	6 June 2018
Bijoy narrates a story of a girl who killed her boyfriend and ran, while he captures a stalker and drowns him in a well.
6	6	"The Ego"	Aarambhh M Singh	Shreyes Lowlekar	6 June 2018
An ego clash between Abhay and Dhruv proves fatal to Dhawre's job, while Lovina falls in love with an extremely good guy.
7	7	"The Stalker"	Aarambhh M Singh	Shreyes Lowlekar	6 June 2018
Drunken Dhawre dies while saving Lovina birdie from a surprise attack of the stalker.
8	8	"The Vanisher"	Aarambhh M Singh	Shreyes Lowlekar	6 June 2018
'Vanisher' makes it to the head-lines and Inspector Meenaxi Reddy joins CBI's team.
9	9	"The Perfect Guy"	Aarambhh M Singh	Shreyes Lowlekar	6 June 2018
DIG trusts Dhruv over Abhay and allows him to lead the case, while Lovina is bored by Apurva's good boy image.
10	10	"The Backfire"	Aarambhh M Singh	Shreyes Lowlekar	6 June 2018
The perfect guy meets a dead end, while Dhruv and Meenaxi connect 'Bake and Berry' bakery to their individual investigations.
11	11	"The Fear"	Aarambhh M Singh	Shreyes Lowlekar	6 June 2018
Abhay and Dhruv reach Lovina's house through their personal investigations. Bijoy is scared but the death of father Patrick and lust for Lovina, make him stay.
12	12	"The Trap"	Aarambhh M Singh	Shreyes Lowlekar	6 June 2018
Lovina is called to Police station for the case of missing Rohan, while Rohan is kidnapped by the Stalker. Dhruv's growing ego clashes with his teammates, while Abhay gets closer to Lovina.
13	13	"Keep Your Enemies Closer"	Aarambhh M Singh	Shreyes Lowlekar	6 June 2018
Dhruv is sure about Lovina's involvement and does a thorough research on her, while Meenaxi traces Rohan and learns of the stalker, Neil Bhatt.
14	14	"The Revelation"	Aarambhh M Singh	Shreyes Lowlekar	6 June 2018
The cake delivered to a customer from Bake and Berry bakery arrives with a finger, which happens to be Dhawre's. DIG gives case back to Abhay, making Dhruv angry and vengeful. He investigates and learns the truth about Neil Bhatt.
15	15	"Game Over?"	Aarambhh M Singh	Shreyes Lowlekar	6 June 2018
Everything boils down to Lovina Birdie. Abhay and Dhruv reach Lovina's house to save her but the confusion kills Dhruv and the fear of being caught kills Abhay. Lovina, the Vanisher, survives.

=== Season 2 ===
No. overall	No. in series	Title	Directed by	Written by	Original release date
16	1	"The Folklore"	Ekant Babani	Shreyes Lowlekar	14 January 2020
17	2	"The Search"	Ekant Babani	Shreyes Lowlekar	19 January 2020
18	3	"The Confrontation"	Ekant Babani	Shreyes Lowlekar	19 January 2020
19	4	"The Guilt"	Ekant Babani	Shreyes Lowlekar	19 January 2020
20	5	"The Truth"	Ekant Babani	Shreyes Lowlekar	19 January 2020
21	6	"The Betrayal"	Ekant Babani	Shreyes Lowlekar	19 January 2020

=== Season 3 ===
No. overall	No. in series	Title	Directed by	Written by	Original release date
22	1	"The Mistake"	Ekant Babani	Vrushank Juneja	20 January 2022
It is Shanaya's dream come true when she meets Rashmi for the first time.
23	2	"The Reveal"	Ekant Babani	Vrushank Juneja	20 January 2022
Unfortunate killings are followed by unfortunate news.
24	3	"The Chase"	Ekant Babani	Vrushank Juneja	20 January 2022
Rashmi gets closer to finding the killer while Shanaya touches new heights in her undercover endeavour.
25	4	"The Face Off"	Ekant Babani	Vrushank Juneja	20 January 2022
It is the ultimate face-off but the question is who is more stunned with whose identity.
26	5	"The End"	Ekant Babani	Vrushank Juneja	20 January 2022
A damaging end to an unfortunate journey.

== Release ==
Damaged is the first web series launched by Hungama.

A two-minute trailer for Damaged, featuring the main leads, was released on 6 June 2018, with the tagline "India’s first ground-breaking show about a woman serial killer". After the success of season 1, the makers announced season 2 in late September 2019, with Hina Khan and Adhyayan Suman. The teaser for Damaged 2 was released on 6 January 2020, while the trailer was released on 14 January 2020. Season 2 got more than 43 million views within its the first month of its release. The third season teaser was revealed in the first week of January 2022.

Damaged is available to stream through Hungama Play on Vodafone Play, Idea Movies & TV, Airtel Xstream App, Amazon Fire TV Stick, Tata Sky Binge, MX Player, and Android TVs. Additionally, Hungama's association with Xiaomi will enable consumers to watch the series via Hungama Play on Mi TV.

== Awards and nominations ==
Year	Award	Category	Nominee(s)	Result	Ref.
2019	ScreenXX Summit & Awards	Best Actress in a Negative Role - Hindi Web Originals	Amruta Khanvilkar	Won	
2019	MTV IWMBuzz Digital Awards	Best Performer by an Actress in a Negative Role	Amruta Khanvilkar	Won	
2021	MTV IWMBuzz Digital Awards	Most Popular Actress in a Web Series (Drama)	Hina Khan	Nominated	
2021	MTV IWMBuzz Digital Awards	Best Performer by an Actress in a Negative Role in a Web Series	Hina Khan	Won	
2021	Indian Telly Streaming Awards	Best Actress in a Negative Role (Jury)	Hina Khan	Won	
2021	Indian Telly Streaming Awards	Best Actress in a Negative Role (Popular)	Hina Khan	Nominated	
2021	Indian Telly Streaming Awards	Best actor in a Negative Role	Adhyayan Suman	Nominated	
2021	ScreenXX Summit & Awards	Best Content - Thriller (Critics')	Damaged 2	Won	
2021	ScreenXX Summit & Awards	Most Popular Hindi Web Series - Psychological Thriller	Damaged 2	Won	
2021	ScreenXX Summit & Awards	Best Actor in a Negative Role - Hindi Web Originals - Psychological Thriller	Adhyayan Suman	Won	
2021	ScreenXX Summit & Awards	Best Actress in a Negative Role - Hindi Web Originals	Hina Khan	Won	
2021	ScreenXX Summit & Awards	Best Actress in a Negative Role - Hindi Web Originals - Psychological Thriller	Hina Khan	Won	
2022	ScreenXX Summit & Awards	Best Content - Drama Series (Viewers' Choice)	Damaged 3	Won	
