= Arjun (2011 film) =

- Directed by: F. M. Ilyas
- Screenplay by: F. M. Ilyas
- Produced by: M. A. Burondkar; F. M. Ilyas
- Starring: Sachit Patil; Amruta Khanvilkar
- Cinematography: Najeeb Khan
- Edited by: Faisal Mahadik; Imran Mahadik
- Music by: Lalit Sen
- Release date: 16 September 2011
- Country: India
- Language: Marathi

Arjun is a 2011 (Marathi अर्जुन) Indian action drama film written, directed and produced by F. M. Ilyas. It was released on 16 September 2011 under the banner of Cinematics.

== Plot ==
A youth sets up his own business despite sociocultural and political issues that stand in his way.

== Cast ==
- Sachit Patil As Arjun
- Amruta Khanvilkar As Anushka
- Vidyadhar Joshi As Ratan Shah
- Vinay Apte As Jay Thackeray
- Varsha Usgaonkar As Maya Thackeray
- Arun Nalawade As Bajirao
- Uday Tikekar As Mahajan
- Snigdha Sabnis As Arjun’s Mother
- Kamalesh Sawant As Police Officer
- Uday Sabnis As Advocate
- Anant Jog As Income Tax Officer
- Mamata Soni As Dancer

== Soundtrack ==
The songs were composed by Lalit Sen.

No.	Title	Lyrics	Singer(s)	Length
1.	"Gaar Gaar Ha Pawan Bawra"	Zaheer Kalam	Shreya Ghoshal	5:27
2.	"Pahilya Priticha Gandh ( Female)"	Ibrahim Afghan	Devaki Pandit	4:52
3.	"He Shwas Tuze"	Ashwini Shende	Bela Shende, Kunal Ganjawala	5:24
4.	"Mazya Dolyatil Kajal"	Zaheer Kalam	Vaishali Samant	3:37
5.	"Pahilya Priticha Gandh ( Male)"	Ibrahim afghan	Udit Narayan	4:52
6.	"Roz Kasoti Roz Samna"	Zaheer Kalam	Kavita Krishnamurthy	5:22
7.	"Gaar Gaar Ha Pawan Bawra"	Instrumental	Lalit Sen	5:34
8.	"He Shwas Tuze"	Instrumental	Lalit Sen	5:22

== Release ==
Arjun is the first film to be screened at the Bombay Stock Exchange.

== Reception ==
=== Awards ===
- Best Supporting Actor 2011 Maharashtra State Film Awards
- Best Dialogues 2011 Maharashtra State Film Awards
- Best Singer (Female)2011 Maharashtra State Film Awards
- Best Choreographer 2011 Maharashtra State Film Awards
- Best Editing 2011 Maharashtra State Film Awards

==== Maharashtra Times: Mata Sanman ====
- Best Choreographer

==== Zee Chitra Gaurav Puraskar ====
- Zee Chitra Gaurav Puraskar for Best Playback Singer – Female For Song Pahilya priticha Gandh - Devaki Pandit

=== Maharashtracha Favourite Kon? ===
- MFK Award for Favourite Actress - Amruta Khanvilkar
- MFK Award for Favourite Actor - Sachit Patil

==== Sanskruti Kaladarpan ====
- Best Popular Film
- Best Choreographer

== Sources ==
- BSE opens door to moviedom with Marathi language film, Arjun
- About ‘Sons of the soil’ (page 25 film review)
- अर्जुन येतोय...
- शहराकडे चला...
- नायक नही...
