= Aayna Ka Bayna =

- Directed by: Samit Kakkad
- Screenplay by: Samit Kakkad
- Story by: Raju Khuste; Suchita Sawant
- Produced by: Amar Kakkad; Pushpa Kakkad; Manju Porwal
- Starring: Sachin Khedekar; Amruta Khanvilkar
- Cinematography: Sanjay Jadhav
- Edited by: Rahul Bhatankar
- Music by: Ajit-Sameer
- Production company: Akshara Films Division
- Release date: 30 November 2012
- Running time: 91 minutes
- Country: India
- Language: Marathi

Aayna Ka Bayna also known as Delinquent Dancers is a 2012 Marathi-language musical drama film written and directed by Samit Kakkad. The film stars Sachin Khedekar and Amruta Khanvilkar while Siddesh Pai, Amit Rokade, Dinesh Kamble, Pravin Nair, Anand Chavan, Sanket Farad, Rahul Kulkarni, Akhilesh Vishvakarma and Nikhil Rajemahadik portray pivotal roles. A group of juveniles living in a remand home possess amazing dancing skills, but their path is hindered by their warden. Two dance masters assist and guide these aspirants towards their goal.

The film received positive response from critics and audience upon release. Moreover, it went on to screened at twelve film festivals across the globe and won several accolades, it received two Zee Chitra Gaurav Awards and one Sanskruti Kala Darpan Award while internationally it won ten awards at CineRockom International Film Festival, including Best Feature Film, Best Director (Kakkad), Best Actor (Khedekar) and Best Actress (Khanvilkar).

== Plot ==
The story about group of juveniles living in a remand home who are eagerly trying to sort out their bleak lives. To help them, Shivani uses the dance therapy to counsel them. As a part of it, these boys get a chance to take part in a dance competition. But their strict warden Sathe opposes them. The boys then decide to escape and show their special talent to the world.

== Cast ==
- Sachin Khedekar as Harshwardhan Sathe
- Amruta Khanvilkar as Shivani
- Ganesh Yadav as Kishore Kadam
- Rakesh Vashisht as Sagar
- Siddesh Pai as Chuttan
- Amit Rokade as Sample
- Dinesh Kamble as Putran
- Pravin Nair as Tochan
- Anand Chavan as Mutra
- Sanket Farad as Joseph
- Rahul Kulkarni as Teen Patti
- Akhilesh Vishvakarma as Bike Raja
- Nikhil Rajemahadik as Vikash Pele
- Sulabha Arya as Putran's mother
- Chhaya Kadam as Chuttan's mother
- Jaywant Wadkar as Chuttan's father
- Nandakishor Choughule
- Shaikh Sami Usman
- Kiranraaj Pohe
- Ranbir Chaudhari
- Prashant Rane
- Sagar Satpute as Chillar room boy
- Santosh Juvekar as Anchor (special Appearance)

== Production ==
Kakkad held an open auditions for the role of nine juveniles with the intention to cast dancers with the same background. 400 people showed up, coincidentally one of Rokade's nephews and four students from his dance school were signed for the movie. They underwent a 20 days acting workshop.

== Soundtrack ==
The film songs and background score is composed by Ajit-Sameer. The title track of the film was choreographed by Umesh Jadhav even before the song was written by Vidyadhar Bhave and recorded. He took help of international tracks of Pitbull, Beyonce, Eminem and Michael Jackson among others to choreograph the nine hip-hop dancers. The remaining songs are choreographed by Boogie Woogie winner Rohan Rokade.

Track listing
| No. | Title | Length |
|---|---|---|
| 1. | "Aayna Ka Bayna (Title Track)" | 4:26 |
| 2. | "Maula Mere" | 3:13 |
| 3. | "Stone Paper Scissor" | 2:04 |
| 4. | "Balle Balle" | 1:20 |
| 5. | "Locking Popping Na Sikha" | 6:38 |
| 6. | "Gheuntak" | 1:52 |
| 7. | "Bandh Kar Bandh Kar" | 2:01 |
| Total length: | | 21:34 |

== Release and reception ==
The film had its theatrical release on 30 November 2012 and in 2014 the film was dubbed in Hindi and aired on Sony Max. The film was chosen as a closing film of the Reelworld Film Festival, Toronto in 2013. The film subsequently screened at 39th Seattle International Film Festival, 10th Indian Film Festival Stuttgart.

=== Accolades ===
| Awards | Year | Category | Recipient(s) | Result |
|---|---|---|---|---|
| CineRockom International Film Festival | 2013 | Best Feature Film (Diamond Award) | Samit Kakkad | Won |
| CineRockom International Film Festival | 2013 | Best Director (Gold Award) | Samit Kakkad | Won |
| CineRockom International Film Festival | 2013 | Best Actor (Silver Award) | Sachin Khedekar | Won |
| CineRockom International Film Festival | 2013 | Best Lead Actress (Gold Award) | Amruta Khanvilkar | Won |
| CineRockom International Film Festival | 2013 | Best Music Score (Silver Award) | Ajit Parab | Won |
| CineRockom International Film Festival | 2013 | Best Young Artist (Silver Award) | Siddesh Pai | Won |
| CineRockom International Film Festival | 2013 | Best Young Artist (Blue Award) | Sanket Farad | Won |
| CineRockom International Film Festival | 2013 | Best Editing (Diamond Award) | Rahul Bhatankar | Won |
| CineRockom International Film Festival | 2013 | Best Cinematography (Gold Award) | Sanjay Jadhav | Won |
| CineRockom International Film Festival | 2013 | Best Production Design (Silver Award) | Vasu Patil | Won |
| Marathi Chitrapat Parivaar- Pune | 2013 | Best Screenplay | Samit Kakkad | Won |
| Sanskruti Kala Darpan Awards | 2013 | Best Director | Samit Kakkad | Nominated |
| Sanskruti Kala Darpan Awards | 2013 | Best Actor | Sachin Khedekar | Nominated |
| Sanskruti Kala Darpan Awards | 2013 | Best Cinematography | Sanjay Jadhav | Won |
| Zee Gaurav Awards | 2013 | Best Film | Aayna Ka Bayna | Nominated |
| Zee Gaurav Awards | 2013 | Special Jury Award | Aayna Ka Bayna | Won |
| Zee Gaurav Awards | 2013 | Best Director | Samit Kakkad | Nominated |
| Zee Gaurav Awards | 2013 | Best Background Music | Ajit- Sameer | Nominated |
| Zee Gaurav Awards | 2013 | Best Sound | Manoj Mochemadkar | Nominated |
| Zee Gaurav Awards | 2013 | Best Editor | Rahul Bhatankar | Nominated |
| Zee Gaurav Awards | 2013 | Best Cinematography | Sanjay Jadhav | Nominated |
| Zee Gaurav Awards | 2013 | Best Choreography | Umesh Jadhav, Rohan Rokade | Won |
