= Golmaal (Marathi film) =

Marathi film

- Directed by: Dnyanesh Bhalekar
- Written by: Dnyanesh Bhalekar; Sachin Dharekar
- Produced by: Ashvin; Hema
- Starring: Jitendra Joshi; Amruta Khanvilkar; Bharat Jadhav; Sunil Tawde; Rahul Gore
- Cinematography: Raja Satankar; Rahul Jadhav
- Edited by: Vidhyadhar Pathare
- Music by: Avadhoot Gupte
- Production company: A. V. Telefilms Pvt. Ltd
- Release date: January 2006
- Running time: 138 minutes
- Country: India
- Language: Marathi

Golmaal (transl. scam) also spelled as Goolmaal, is a 2006 Indian Marathi-language romantic comedy film directed by Dnyanesh Bhalekar, written by him and Sachin Darekar, and produced under A. V. Telefilms Pvt. Ltd. The film features Jitendra Joshi, Amruta Khanvilkar in dual roles, Bharat Jadhav, Rahul Gore and Sunil Tawde. The film's story revolves around four guys who fall in love with the same girl and the competition between them to win her. The film was a superhit at the box office.

== Plot ==
Raj, a modern guy, and Soham, a simpleton, are two friends who share an apartment. Soham has loved Purva since his college days but has never proposed to her. Raj comes across Purva and falls in love with her, unaware that she is the same girl. Raj tells Soham that Purva is a flirt and he should distance himself from her, but Soham discovers Raj's plans, and they both decide to find out whether Purva has feelings for either of them. Madhav Malvankar (Mama), a middle-aged, much-married man, also falls in love with Purva. The three are competing with each other to learn about Purva's feelings, but the worst happens when a millionaire Dhiru arrives, whom Purva has known for a long time. But the trio feels he is not what he claims to be and decides to uncover the truth.

== Cast ==
- Jitendra Joshi as Soham Dixit
- Amruta Khanvilkar as Purva Pendse/ Apurva Pendse
- Bharat Jadhav as Dhairyashil Chiplunkar (Dhiru)
- Sunil Tawde as Madhav Malvankar (Mama)
- Rahul Gore as Rajesh Deshmukh (Raj)
- Atul Parchure as Detective Bhanudas Bhinge (Bhabi)
- Savita Malpekar as Gajra Tai
- Dr. Vilas Ujavane as Mr. Pendse
- Shama Nivane as Mrs. Pendse
- Supriya Pathare as Gajra Tai's henchwoman
- Jayraj Nair as Manager
- Mahesh Kokate as Caterer

== Production ==
The film was shot at various locations, including Filmcity, Kamalistan Studio, Gemini Studio, and Sanjay Gandhi National Park. The film marked the debut film for director Bhalekar and actress Khanvilkar in the Marathi industry, while it was Joshi's first film as lead actor.

== Soundtrack ==
Golmaal

Soundtrack album by Avadhoot Gupte
- Released: 2003
- Studios: Studio Geet; Studio In Sync
- Genre: Feature film soundtrack
- Length: 22:38
- Language: Marathi
- Label: Video Palace

Avadhoot Gupte chronology
Golmaal (2003)	Tula Shikwin Changlach Dhada (2007)

The music of the film has been directed by Avadhoot Gupte, while the lyrics have been penned by Gupte and Guru Thakur. This film also marked Gupte's first film as music director. The songs were choreographed by Umesh Jaadhav.

The background score was composed by Sachin-Jigar.

Track listing
No.	Title	Lyrics	Singer(s)	Length
1.	"Golmaal (Title Track)"	Avdhoot Gupte	Avdhoot Gupte; Ravindra Upadhyay	03.33
2.	"Pari Mhanu Ki Sundara"	Guru Thakur	Swapnil Bandodkar; Avdhoot Gupte	04:21
3.	"Hi Gulabi Hawa"	Guru Thakur	Vaishali Samant	05:02
4.	"Tighe Nahi Chaughe"	Avadhoot Gupte	Avadhoot Gupte	02:47
5.	"Zol Zol Zol Karun Taak"	Guru Thakur	Avadhoot Gupte; Nandesh Umap	04:33
6.	"Golmaal (Title Track Remix)"	Avdhoot Gupte	Avdhoot Gupte; Ravindra Upadhyay	03.02
Total length:				22:38

== Release and reception ==
The film was released in early 2006 and received a positive response from critics and the audience.

=== Awards ===
- MaTa Sanman for Best Music Director - Avadhoot Gupte
- MaTa Sanman for Best Female Playback Singer - Vaishali Samant
- Marathi Hasya Sanman for Best Director - Dnyanesh Bhalekar
- Marathi Hasya Sanman for Best Film - Dnyanesh Bhaleka

== See also ==
- List of Marathi films of 2006
