= Phoonk =

- Theatrical release poster
- Directed by: Ram Gopal Varma
- Written by: Milind Gadagkar
- Produced by: Praveen Nischol Nischol; Azam Khan; Parvez Damania
- Starring: Sudeep; Amruta Khanvilkar; Ahsaas Channa; Kenny Desai; Ashwini Kalsekar; Zakir Hussain
- Cinematography: Savita Singh
- Edited by: Amit Parmar; Nipun Gupta
- Release date: August 22, 2008 (India)
- Running time: 110 minutes
- Country: India
- Language: Hindi
- Box office: ₹13.62 crore

Phoonk (transl. Blow) is a 2008 Indian supernatural horror film directed by Ram Gopal Varma and produced by Praveen Nischol. The film stars Sudeep, Amruta Khanvilkar, and Ahsaas Channa in the lead roles, while Kenny Desai, Ashwini Kalsekar, and Zakir Hussain play supporting roles. The film is based on superstition and black magic. The film was released on 22 August 2008 and was declared a blockbuster at the box office by several media outlets. The film marks the debut of lead actor Suddep as his 25th film in Hindi.

Varma derived the idea for the film from a Hindi news channel which telecasts stories on black magic. The storyline of Phoonk is thematically similar to the Telugu thriller novel Tulasi Dalam by Yandamuri Veerendranath. A prize of ₹5 lakh (US$5,200) was announced for those who will watch the film alone in a theatre.

The film was remade in Telugu as Raksha and was dubbed in Tamil as Bommayi. It was followed by a sequel, Phoonk 2, in 2010.

== Plot ==
Civil engineer and atheist Rajiv lives in Mumbai with his wife Aarti, their two children Raksha and Rohan, his mother, and the housemaid Laxmi. Rajiv's most trusted colleagues are Anshuman and Madhu, whom everyone, including Rajiv's friend Vinay and Raksha, feels are not normal. During a party at his house, when he learns that the married couple have cheated him on a valuable contract for an IT firm in Delhi, Rajiv fires both of them after insulting them both. Humiliated and angry at this, they both seek vengeance on Rajiv. Madhu notes that Rajiv is fond of Raksha.

Soon, a series of strange events starts to take place in and around Rajiv's house. Mandar, who is appointed to take the place of Madhu and Anshuman, is mysteriously killed at the construction site. Raksha starts to talk and behave weirdly, much to everyone's shock. Doctors are called for, but the strange behaviour continues, with Raksha levitating, talking in a manly voice, acting in pain. The superstitious and religious grandmother repeatedly says that someone is using black magic on Raksha, but Rajiv and the doctors refuse to believe any of it.

Now at the end of his wits, Rajiv begins to look to God. He also agrees to his construction labourers' demand of making a small shrine at the construction site, which he previously opposed. Vinay suggests asking for the help of Manja, a magician familiar with these things.

Manja analyses the situation, sees Raksha, visits Rajiv's house, and tells the latter that someone is trying to take revenge on him, at which Vinay exclaims that it is none other than Madhu and Anshuman. Manja also tells them that Rajiv's driver has been helping the duo by providing them with necessary objects like Raksha's hair, soil from her foot, and her toys to perform black magic.

Wasting no more time, Rajiv, Vinay, and Manja rush to Madhu's house, where she and Anshuman are found to be performing black magic rituals on a doll, supposedly an effigy of Raksha. Rajiv orders Madhu to stop, but she attacks him with a trishul. Vinay takes on Anshuman. The effect of the black magic seeps into the entire place, pushing everyone away. As Madhu is going to attack Rajiv who is being pushed towards the wall, Manja uses his powers to separate the running ceiling fan, which lands on Madhu's head, decapitating her. All the negative forces stop, and a spider comes out of one of the skulls on the floor and bites the driver, who dies.

Everyone rushes to the hospital to find that Raksha has completely recovered. Rajiv and Vinay see that everyone thinks it is the doctors who have cured Raksha, and they smile at each other.

== Cast ==
- Sudeep as Rajiv (Voice in Hindi by Rajesh Khattar)
- Amruta Khanvilkar as Aarti
- Ahsaas Channa as Raksha
- Kenny Desai as Anshuman
- Ashwini Kalsekar as Madhu
- Ganesh Yadav as Vinay Sonti
- Zakir Hussain as Manja
- Shrey Bawa as Rohan
- Anu Ansari as Laxmi
- Javed Rizvi as Rajiv's driver
- Shankar Sachdev as Shyam
- K. K. Raina as Dr. Pandey
- Lilette Dubey as Dr. Seema Walke
- Bharat Kaul as Mandar
- Jyoti Subhash as Amma
- Geetanjali as Teacher
- Kishore Kadam as Devappa
- Dhiraj Regmi as Mani

== Reception ==
=== Box office ===
Phoonk turned out to be a success at the box office. The movie opened after an effective publicity campaign. which, combined with its success at the box office, turned a good profit for its investors. It was very popular, especially among younger viewers, for the creator's Rs. 5 Lakh challenge.

=== Critical response ===
Critically, the movie received mixed reviews. Taran Adarsh gave it 4 out of 5 and said, "Phoonk is a fascinating cinematic experience on a subject that’s rarely tackled by the dream merchants in Bollywood: Black magic.

== Sequel ==
A sequel, Phoonk 2, was released on 16 April 2010, to mostly negative reviews and a lackluster commercial reception, failing to repeat the success of the original.

== Accolades ==
Ceremony	Categtory	Nominee	Result	Ref
Stardust Awards	Hottest New Film		Nominated	
Stardust Awards	Exciting New Face	Amruta Khanvilkar	Nominated	
Screen Awards	Screen Award for Best Villain	Ashwini Kalsekar	Nominated	
Screen Awards	Screen Award for Best Background Music	Bapi-Tutul	Nominated	
