= Jeevlaga =

Marathi-language romantic drama TV series

- Genre: Romance; Drama
- Based on: Play by Chandrashekhar Phansalkar
- Written by: Parag Kulkarni; Swami Bal
- Directed by: Umesh Namjoshi; Bharat Gaikwad
- Starring: See below
- Music by: Nilesh Moharir
- No. of episodes: 80

Production
- Producer: Vidyadhar Pathare
- Editor: Bhakti Mayaloo
- Camera setup: Multi-camera
- Running time: 20 minutes
- Production company: Iris Productions

Original release
- Network: Star Pravah
- Release: 22 April – 1 August 2019

Jeevlaga (transl. Soulmate) is an Indian Marathi language romantic drama television series that aired on Star Pravah from 22 April 2019 to 1 August 2019. The show starred Swapnil Joshi, Amruta Khanvilkar, Siddharth Chandekar and Madhura Deshpande and was produced by Vidyadhar Pathare under Iris Productions.

The story explores the complexities of love, trust and relationships through the lives of two married couples whose past and present intertwine in unexpected ways. During the COVID-19 pandemic in India, the show was re-telecast from 2 May 2021.

== Cast ==
=== Main ===
- Swapnil Joshi as Vishwas
- Amruta Khanvilkar as Kavya
- Siddharth Chandekar as Nikhil
- Madhura Deshpande as Vidhi

=== Recurring ===
- Uday Tikekar as Vinod
- Sneha Raikar as Kavya's mother
- Seema Deshmukh as Mai, Vidhi's mother
- Rajan Bhise as Abba, Nikhil's father
- Seema Chandekar as Nikhil's mother
- Kiran Bhalerao as Shrinivas

== Production ==
The show was announced in March 2019, featuring the four main cast. It was originally set to premiere on 8 April 2019, but was postponed to 22 April. It was one of the most anticipated shows of the time due to its cast and crew, as Swapnil Joshi and Satish Rajwade, the creative head of the channel, were collaborating after the success of the Mumbai-Pune-Mumbai franchise. Additionally, the show marked Amruta Khanvilkar's debut in a fictional television series. Jeevlaga also featured Siddharth Chandekar alongside his real-life mother, Seema Chandekar, playing the same role. The overall costume department was handled by Sampada Mahadik, while Khanvilkar's costumes were designed by Neha Chaudhari.

=== Music ===
The title track of Jeevlaga was written and composed by Shripad Arun Joshi and sung by Vaishali Samant, Swapnil Bandodkar, Aarya Ambekar and Hrishikesh Ranade. Nilesh Moharir composed the original songs and background score for the show.
