= Gaiir =

- Directed by: Satish Rajwade
- Screenplay by: Parag Kulkarni; Satish Rajwade
- Story by: Parag Kulkarni; Shirish Rajwade
- Produced by: Hasmukh Hirani; G. Prashant; Santosh Navle
- Starring: Sandeep Kulkarni; Ankush Chaudhari; Amruta Khanvilkar; Tejaswini Pandit
- Narrated by: Sachin Khedekar
- Cinematography: Suresh Deshmane
- Edited by: Rajesh Rao
- Music by: Avinash–Vishwajeet
- Production company: Kruti Films
- Release date: 9 November 2009
- Running time: 148 minutes
- Country: India
- Language: Marathi
- Budget: ₹1.5 crore

Gaiir is a 2009 Indian Marathi-language mystery-thriller film, directed by Satish Rajwade and produced by Hasmukh Hirani, G. Prashant and Santosh Navel under Kruti Films. The film stars Sandeep Kulkarni, Ankush Chaudhari, Amruta Khanvilkar and Tejaswini Pandit in the lead roles. It revolves around a man who sets out to find his look-alike after being pursued by his wife. The discovery about the same reveals a sinister plot of deception and treachery for all the people involved.

== Plot ==
Sameer Shroff (Kulkarni) is a business tycoon. Smart, young, attractive, and daring personality. He marries Neha (Khanvilkar), the daughter of an NRI Bhaskar (Vidyadhar Joshi). They, like most newly weds, had expectations for a bright future. Neha becomes aware that Samir's doppelganger lives in the same city. Samir's doppelganger targets Neha and attempts to disrupt both his personal and professional life. Inspector Avinash Sardesai (Chaudhari) assists Sameer in resolving the problem.

== Cast ==
- Sandeep Kulkarni as Sameer Shroff/ Shashank Abhyankar
- Ankush Chaudhari as Inspector Abhijit Sardesai
- Amruta Khanvilkar as Neha
- Tejaswini Pandit as Nethra/ Mansi Deshmukh
- Uday Tikekar as Joseph (Joezi)
- Ila Bhate as Jaishree Shroff/ Jaishree Patil
- Vidyadhar Joshi as NRI Bhaskar
- Amita Khopkar as Jariwala Aunty/ Savita Bhonsale
- Mahesh Joshi as Thakur/ Mahendra Shirod
- Sandeep Pathak as Mohan
- Shrirang Deshmukh as Udaybhan

== Production ==
The film is known for its expensive sets, beautiful locations, fancy cars, and choppers, all of which are unusual in Marathi films.

== Soundtrack ==
The film's songs were composed by Avinash–Vishwajeet.

Track listing
No.	Title	Lyrics	Singer(s)	Length
1.	"Gaiir (Title Track)"			03:16
2.	"Ye Na Mithit Majhya"	Vivek Apte	Hariharan	03:35
3.	"Sahi Kya Hai (Remix)"	Shrirang Godbole	Shreya Ghoshal	04:19
4.	"Tu Ye Na"	Ashwini Shende	Kunal Ganjawala	03:31
Total length:				14:01

== Release and reception ==
The film was released in theaters on 9 November 2009, it received praise from critics and audience. The film was a hit at box office.

=== Awards ===
Year	Award	Category	Recipient(s)	Result	Ref.
2010	Maharashtracha Favourite Kon?	Favourite Actress	Amruta Khanvilkar	Nominated	
2010	Maharashtracha Favourite Kon?	Favourite Villain	Ankush Chaudhari	Nominated	
