= Bhooth Bangla =

2026 Indian film by Priyadarshan

- Theatrical release poster
- Directed by: Priyadarshan
- Screenplay by: Priyadarshan; Rohan Shankar; Abilash Nair
- Dialogues by: Rohan Shankar
- Story by: Aakash Kaushik
- Produced by: Akshay Kumar; Shobha Kapoor; Ekta Kapoor
- Starring: Akshay Kumar; Paresh Rawal; Jisshu Sengupta; Mithila Palkar; Rajpal Yadav; Tabu; Wamiqa Gabbi; Asrani
- Cinematography: Divakar Mani
- Edited by: M. S. Aiyappan Nair
- Music by: Songs: Pritam; Score: Ronnie Raphael
- Production companies: Balaji Motion Pictures; Cape of Good Films
- Distributed by: Pen Marudhar
- Release date: 17 April 2026
- Running time: 164 minutes
- Country: India
- Language: Hindi
- Budget: ₹120 crore
- Box office: ₹247.28 crore

Bhooth Bangla (transl. Haunted Mansion) is a 2026 Indian Hindi-language horror comedy film directed by Priyadarshan and produced by Akshay Kumar, Ekta Kapoor and Shobha Kapoor under Balaji Motion Pictures and Cape of Good Films. The film stars Akshay Kumar, Paresh Rawal, Jisshu Sengupta, Mithila Palkar, Rajpal Yadav, Tabu, Wamiqa Gabbi, and Asrani.

It marked Priyadarshan's second Hindi-language horror comedy film following Bhool Bhulaiyaa (2007), both of which star Kumar, Rawal, Yadav, Asrani, and Manoj Joshi. Bhooth Bangla was theatrically released on 17 April 2026. It grossed ₹247.28 crore worldwide to become the sixth highest-grossing Hindi film of 2026.

== Plot ==
At a storm-battered railway platform in Mangalpur, stranded travellers listen to an old mystic recount the legend of Vadhusur, a demon granted immortality by Lord Shiva who could only be killed by his own hand or bloodline. Betrayed and killed by a celestial apsara during their wedding, Vadhusur's ghost roams the world seeking revenge. He feeds on newly married women and haunts the local Acharya Palace. Years later, Dushyant Acharya (Guruji) fakes his death and leaves the estate to his grandchildren Arjun and Meera. Despite warnings from caretaker Shantaram, Arjun decides to restore the palace for Meera's wedding. On the way, he encounters a writer, Priya, who is searching for her missing sister, and saves her from an accident. At the palace, Arjun is briefly electrocuted and killed in the bathroom, but Priya revives him with CPR.

Guruji's secrets are soon revealed. He had built an automated device that played sacred mantras to keep Vadhusur dormant, but his son Madhav, jealous of a woman named Yashodha, sabotaged it so that the mantras played in reverse. Madhav consequently becomes partially possessed as Vadhusur's physical vessel. Vasudev was forced aside, while Yashodha's true love raised her son Arjun as his own, meaning Arjun is actually Madhav's biological son and carries Vadhusur's bloodline. A priest warns that evil grows in darkness and urges the wedding to take place during the day, with the couple crossing the Ganges before sunset. However, Guruji arranges the wedding at the palace intending to use Meera as the 13th and final sacrifice needed to fully resurrect Vadhusur and free Madhav.

Despite Arjun's objections, the groom's family insists on an auspicious nighttime wedding. Possessed electrician Sunder shuts down the generator, plunging the palace into darkness, and Madhav abducts Meera to a subterranean temple. Vasudev and the priest enter a sealed prayer room to restart the sacred mantra device and weaken Vadhusur, while Arjun confronts his biological father. Using his bloodline, Arjun impales Madhav with a lightning-charged branch from the apsara's sacred tree, destroys the ritual, kills the corrupt Guruji and rescues Meera, who awakens without remembering the ordeal. Arjun angrily confronts the groom's priest for insisting on a nighttime wedding and declares that birth charts are written by humans, not gods.

Later, footage from the group's earlier visit to the temple reveals that 'Priya' is actually the ghost of her murdered twin sister, Chitra. Back at the railway platform, the mystic reveals himself to be an aged Arjun. He explains that the earlier electrocution gave him the ability to see spirits and that he has spent the past 24 years performing rituals to bring peace to the soul of his biological father.

== Cast ==
- Akshay Kumar in a dual role as
  - Arjun Acharya
  - Madhav Acharya / Vadhusur
- Paresh Rawal as Jagdish Manikchand Roopkamal Kewalramani
- Jisshu Sengupta as Dr. Vasudev Acharya, Arjun's adopted father
- Rajpal Yadav as Sunder "Balli" Bajwa
- Tabu as Yashodha, Arjun's mother
- Mithila Palkar as Meera Acharya, Arjun's half-sister
- Wamiqa Gabbi in a dual role as
  - Priya
  - Chitra
- Asrani as Shantaram Yadav / Shambhu Babu, the manager of Acharya palace
- Rajesh Sharma as Dushyant Acharya, Madhav's father and Arjun's grandfather
- Manoj Joshi as Govind Maharaj
- Zakir Hussain as Vashisht Sharma "Vashisht Guruji"
- Bhavna Pani as Ragini
- Perin Malde as Rahul, Meera's fiance
- Manu Menon as Kali
- Alexx O'Nell as Richard Gardener
- Abhishek Bharadwaj as Pandit Ram Shashtri, disciple of Vashisht Guruji
- Chhaya Vora as Rahul's grandmother
- Swatantra Bharat as Groom's brother in the bus

== Production ==
=== Development ===
Bhooth Bangla was officially announced in September 2024 with a motion poster revealed by lead actor Akshay Kumar on his 57th birthday, marking his seventh collaboration with director Priyadarshan, 14 years after Khatta Meetha (2010). The film is produced by Shobha Kapoor and Ekta Kapoor under Balaji Motion Pictures in association with Akshay Kumar's production company, Cape of Good Films. The film's screenplay was written by Rohan Shankar, Abilash Nair and Priyadarshan. Rohan Shankar also wrote the dialogues, while the story was developed by Aakash Kaushik.

Bhooth Bangla is a horror-comedy based on Indian mythology and black magic, with inspiration drawn from ancient texts such as the Vedas and the Mahabharata.

— Priyadarshan

=== Casting ===
Following the film's announcement in September 2024, Paresh Rawal, Rajpal Yadav, and Asrani—longtime collaborators of director Priyadarshan were confirmed as part of the cast. In October 2024, Wamiqa Gabbi was confirmed as the female lead. In January 2025, Tabu and Mithila Palkar were added to the cast, with reports stating that Palkar would portray the sister of Akshay Kumar's character, which was later confirmed by Kumar in his television game show Wheel of Fortune. Palkar later revealed that Kalyani Priyadarshan had recommended her to director Priyadarshan, which helped her secure the role. In March 2025, Jisshu Sengupta was confirmed to have joined the cast, with the announcement made by the makers on his birthday.

=== Filming ===
Principal photography began in December 2024 in Mumbai, Maharashtra. The production later moved to Jaipur, Rajasthan in January 2025 for its next shooting schedule. Portions of the film were shot at several locations, including Galtaji temple, Sisodiya Rani Bagh and Chomu Palace, a location previously used by Priyadarshan for his 2007 film Bhool Bhulaiyaa.

The film's production design was handled by art director Sabu Cyril. In April 2025, the makers shot the climax portions of the film in Hyderabad, where a large palace set was created at Ramoji Film City.

The film was shot extensively in multiple locations including London, Jaipur, Kochi, Mumbai, Chennai and Hyderabad. Principal photography was completed in May 2025, with the shooting of a song sequence featuring Akshay Kumar and Wamiqa Gabbi, with choreography by Pony Verma. M. R. Rajakrishnan worked as the film's sound designer.

== Soundtrack ==
Bhooth Bangla

Soundtrack album by Pritam
- Released: 17 April 2026
- Genre: Feature film soundtrack
- Length: 16:40
- Language: Hindi
- Label: Zee Music Company

Pritam chronology
| Sunny Sanskari Ki Tulsi Kumari (2025) | Bhooth Bangla (2026) | Cocktail 2 (2026) |

Official audio
- Bhooth Bangla – Full Album on YouTube

The film's soundtrack album was composed by Pritam, with lyrics written by Kumaar. The music rights were acquired by Zee Music Company. The first single titled "Ram Ji Aake Bhala Karenge", was released on 26 February 2026. The song's music video was choreographed by Ganesh Acharya. Its lyrics drew comparisons to those of the song "Bhooter Raja Dilo Bor" from Satyajit Ray's 1969 film Goopy Gyne Bagha Byne. The second single titled "Tu Hi Disda", was released on 24 March 2026. According to reports, singer Arijit Singh, who had earlier announced his exit from playback singing, approached the makers to perform the track, saying that he felt a strong connection with the composition and believed he could bring the required emotional depth to the song. The third single titled "O Sundari", was released on 14 April 2026.

Track listing
| No. | Title | Lyrics | Singer(s) | Length |
|---|---|---|---|---|
| 1. | "Ram Ji Aake Bhala Karenge" | Kumaar, Mellow D | Armaan Malik, Aarvan, Mellow D | 3:55 |
| 2. | "Tu Hi Disda" | Kumaar | Arijit Singh, Nikhita Gandhi | 4:37 |
| 3. | "O Sundari" | Kumaar | Vishal Mishra, Nakash Aziz, Antara Mitra | 3:21 |
| 4. | "O Ri O Sanwariya" | Yatindra Mishra | Javed Ali, Shreya Ghoshal, Prithvi Gandharv | 4:47 |
| Total length: | | | | 16:40 |

== Marketing ==
As a part of the film's promotional campaign, several visual assets and motion posters were released ahead of its theatrical release. The first motion poster was unveiled in September 2024 to officially announce the film. In February 2026, the makers shared an additional motion poster featuring lead actor Akshay Kumar seated on a throne. Later that month, Kumar and Wamiqa Gabbi commenced the publicity tour in Nashik, Maharashtra, beginning with a college campus event that included an aerial entry and interaction with students. The makers held a fan screening of the teaser on 11 March 2026, one day before its official unveiling on 12 March. Ahead of the trailer launch, large cutouts of Kumar holding lanterns were installed in cities such as Delhi and Jaipur. The official trailer was released on 6 April 2026.

== Release ==
=== Theatrical ===
Bhooth Bangla was theatrically released on 17 April 2026. The release was subsequently delayed to avoid a box office clash with Dhurandhar: The Revenge. Paid preview night shows were held on 16 April 2026. It was initially scheduled to release on 2 April 2026, before being postponed to 15 May 2026, and later preponed to 10 April 2026.

=== Certification ===
During certification, a few alterations were requested by the Examining Committee, such as the replacement of certain offensive terms and deletion of an inappropriate word in the subtitles near the end of the film. In addition to this, there was a derogatory line targeting women that needed change in the first half, along with certain disclaimers to be added concerning religious and superstitious. Following this, the film received a UA 16+ certificate on 2 April 2026 by the Central Board of Film Certification (CBFC) in a total duration of 174 minutes. However, the makers later made further voluntary cuts, which were approved on 11 April 2026, reducing the runtime to approximately 164 minutes.

=== Home media ===
The film began streaming on Netflix from 12 June 2026.

== Reception ==
On the review aggregator website Rotten Tomatoes, 15% of 13 critics' reviews are positive, with an average rating of 4.7/10.

A critic from Bollywood Hungama rated the film 3.5/5 stars and said that the film worked for its "humour, performances and old-school Priyadarshan-style chaos. While the first half is highly enjoyable and packed with laughs, the second half loses some steam due to an underwhelming backstory and an overlong climax." Dhaval Roy of The Times of India rated the film 3/5 stars and wrote "While the first half of Bhooth Bangla is thoroughly entertaining and keeps one hooked, a crisper narrative and a shorter runtime would have made this horror comedy far more effective. However, the screenplay turns messy, and both the creatures and some of the set pieces come across as gimmicky in places, especially toward the climax. The film’s length also feels plodding, especially in the second half, which loses steam and sharpness." Sana Farzeen of India Today rated the film 2.5/5 stars and opined that the film had "outdated humour, weak storytelling," and that it lacked the excitement "audiences hoped for." Taher Ahmed of Deccan Herald rated the film 2.5/5 stars and opined that the second half "drifts away from horror and leans into comedy, but not in a way that works. What stands out more is the underutilisation of its characters, many of whom feel limited despite their potential."

Nisha Srivastava of The Sunday Guardian reviewed the film and noted that the film struggled due to "repetitive humour, weak storytelling, and underdeveloped characters. The story does not flow smoothly and often feels like a collection of random scenes put together without strong logic." Lachmi Deb Roy of Firstpost rated the film 2.5/5 stars and opined that the film was "All about Akshay Kumar; wish there was more of Tabu and Jisshu Sengupta in a typical Priyadarshan film. It’s time for Akshay to evolve as an actor. He has proved it yet again: it is time for Bollywood to stop obsessing over stars." Radhika Sharma of NDTV rated the film 2 out 5 and held the film as an example, "if you wish to sell nostalgia, at least respect the audiences who have now grown up. Give them something to hold onto besides a dilapidated story structure that can't stand on its own, even on the foundation of nostalgia." Shubhra Gupta from The Indian Express rated 1.5 out of 5 stars and wrote "A couple of crucial slips never let the film recover. First off, the age shows" in that Sengupta had to resort to "heavy grey dye, but no way does he look to be Akshay's dad", and the worst is "Gabbi's cringey romantic track, with all that forced pouting."
