= Laxman Utekar =

Indian filmmaker

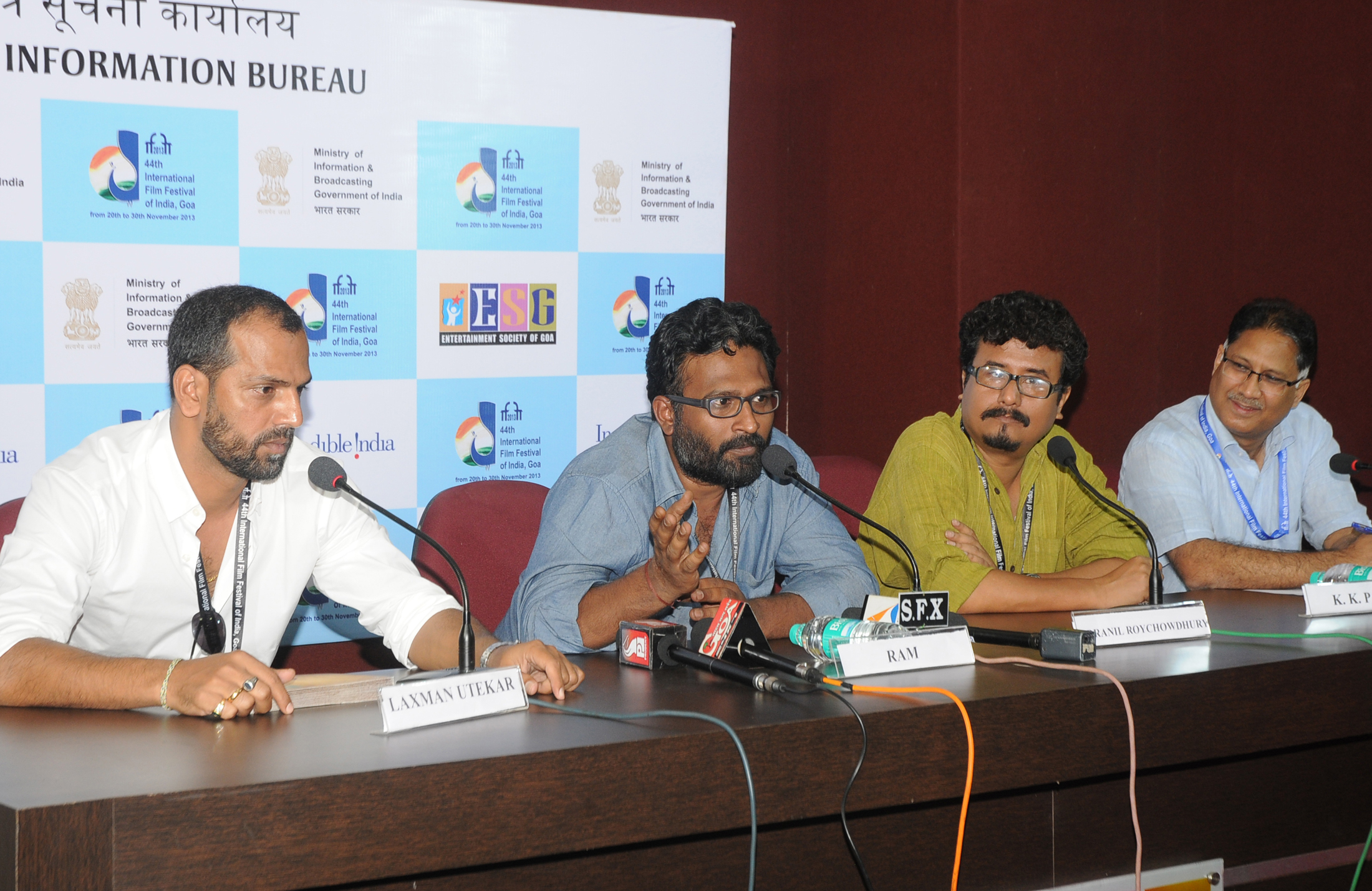
- Utekar at IFFI 2013
- Occupations: Film director; producer; writer; cinematographer
- Years active: 2007–present

Laxman Utekar is an Indian filmmaker and cinematographer known for his work in Hindi and Marathi films. Utekar began his career as a cinematographer in Hindi cinema with English Vinglish (2012) and Dear Zindagi (2016). He made his directorial debut in 2014 with the Marathi film Tapaal. He then went on to direct the Hindi romantic comedies Luka Chuppi (2019) and Zara Hatke Zara Bachke (2023), the comedy-drama Mimi (2021), and the historical action film Chhaava (2025).

== Career ==
Utekar started his career as a director of photography in Hindi cinema in 2007 with Khanna & Iyer. He then went on to work on English Vinglish, Dear Zindagi, Hindi Medium and 102 Not Out. He made his directorial debut in 2014 with Marathi film Tapaal. He then directed Lalbaugchi Rani (2016), a slice of life drama about a mentally challenged girl who gets lost in Mumbai.

Utekar first Hindi film as director was the romantic comedy Luka Chuppi (2019) which starred Kartik Aaryan and Kriti Sanon as a couple in a live in relationship and the chaos ensues when their traditional families assume them to be married to each other. The film received generally positive reviews and emerged as commercial success at the box office, with a total gross collection of ₹128.86 crore (US$13 million).

In 2021, Utekar directed and co-wrote with Rohan Shankar the drama Mimi. A remake of the Marathi film Mala Aai Vhhaychy! (2011). the film reunited him with Sanon, in the titular role of a young woman who opts to be a surrogate mother for a foreign couple. Following the non-existent theatrical releases due to COVID-19 pandemic, the film was released through the streaming services Netflix and JioCinema. The film received positive reviews from critics, with Renuka Vyahare of The Times of India nothing that "it picks a relevant topic and turns it into an engaging, empowering and compassionate tale on humanity and motherhood". Taran Adarsh wrote, “Mimi is a heartwarming saga, aimed at families and it will keep the audience thoroughly entertained.”

In 2023, he directed the romantic comedy Zara Hatke Zara Bachke starring Vicky Kaushal and Sara Ali Khan as a small-town married couple striving to own a home. It received mixed reviews from critics and became a sleeper hit. Produced on a budget of ₹40 crore it grossed ₹115.89 crore worldwide.

In 2024, he co-wrote and co-produced the romantic comedy Kahan Shuru Kahan Khatam, which was the Hindi film debut of singer Dhvani Bhanushali, who starred in the film opposite Aashim Gulati.

In 2025, he co-wrote and directed the epic historical action film Chhaava based on the life of Chhatrapati Sambhaji Maharaj, again starring Vicky Kaushal in the title role. The film received positive reviews from critics and became an all-time blockbuster, grossing over ₹797.34 crore (US$94 million) at the box office. It is the highest-grossing Indian film of 2025 and the eighth highest-grossing Hindi film of all time.

== Filmography ==
Key
†	Denotes films that have not yet been released

Year	Film	Director	Cinematographer	Language	Ref.
2007	Khanna & Iyer		Yes	Hindi	
2009	Blue		Yes	Hindi	
2012	English Vinglish		Yes	Hindi	
2013	Boss		Yes	Hindi	
2014	Tapaal	Yes	Yes	Marathi	
2016	Dear Zindagi		Yes	Hindi	
2016	Lalbaugchi Rani	Yes		Marathi	
2017	Hindi Medium		Yes	Hindi	
2018	102 Not Out		Yes	Hindi	
2019	Luka Chuppi	Yes		Hindi	
2021	Mimi	Yes		Hindi	
2023	Zara Hatke Zara Bachke	Yes		Hindi	
2024	Teri Baaton Mein Aisa Uljha Jiya		Yes	Hindi	
2025	Chhaava	Yes		Hindi	
2026	Eetha	Yes		Hindi	
