= Anvatt =

- Film poster
- Directed by: Gajendra Ahire
- Written by: Gajendra Ahire
- Produced by: Shekhar Jyoti & Urmila Jyoti
- Starring: Adinath Kothare; Urmila Kanetkar; Bhargavi Chirmule; Vibhavari Deshpande; Makarand Anaspure
- Cinematography: Krishna Soren
- Edited by: Mayur Hardas
- Music by: Songs: Hridaynath Mangeshkar; Shankar–Ehsaan–Loy; Background Score: Amar Mohile
- Production company: PSJ Entertainments
- Release date: 1 August 2014
- Running time: 110 min
- Country: India
- Language: Marathi

Anvatt (meaning: Unexpected things) is a 2014 Indian Marathi-language psychological thriller film directed by Gajendra Ahire. Produced by PSJ Entertainment.

== Plot ==
It is a story about Vinay (Adinath Kothare) and Madhura ( Urmila Kanetkar) deciding to spend a year in a remote village as per Vinay's late grandfather's wish. As days pass by, the couple encounters strange experiences. Vinay meets his subordinate Kamath who arranges their stay at an old depilated mansion which has a tragedy associated with a previous owner 'Saibu' who died unfulfilled on his first night after marriage due to a snakebite while out in the forest to get fragrant Kewra flowers for his bride Gulab on her demand. Vinay is a man of science who associates logic and medical science with everything and his wife who is an archaeologist, at times challenges his views with her faith in natural as well as the supernatural.

The couple has a house help Baijama who is a distant relative of the dead previous owner who believes that 'Saibu's restless spirit haunts the mansion and only she can appease it with some rituals. Madhura starts experiencing some unnatural activities in the mansion and starts feeling an unseen presence in the mansion with its frequent power outages which her husband brushes that off as her mind playing tricks on her.

The doctor decides to demolish a shrine dedicated to 'Saibu' on the grounds of the hospital to make a reading room in its place to which the local superstitious population protest and warn the doctor of misfortunes if he does so, nevertheless the doctor himself demolishes the shrine in the villagers' presence.

One rainy night, the doctor is at the hospital working late and his wife is visited by Kamath who seems to be possessed by the spirit of Saibu back to fulfil his desires with Gulab. Kamat ties up the doctor's wife to molest her and in the meantime answers the phone call made by the doctor to inform his wife of him being stuck at the hospital and threatens the doctor that he will kill him if he interferes in his quest.

The doctor panics and rushes to the mansion and has a fist fight with the apparently possessed Kamath in which he gets injured and falls down. In the meantime, the doctor's wife sets herself loose and hits Kamath with a rock on his head and helps the injured doctor up to realise that now her husband is possessed by 'Saibu's spirit as he tries to molest her. The doctor's wife panics and runs back into the mansion to pick up a kitchen knife to defend herself and in the meantime the doctor is able to come to his senses to realise that now his wife is possessed by the spirit and is trying to attack him with the kitchen knife. The doctor tries to help his wife as a person having a psychotic episode because of all the stress by trying to calm her down, but she attacks him with the knife wounding him.

In the meantime, Baijama who is conducting rituals to calm Saibu's spirit runs in with some sacred ash and throws it on the doctor's wife calming her down as the spirit leaves her.

Next day, the police investigate the issue and take statements from everyone involved where Kamath declines to press any charges on the doctor's wife and vice versa. The doctor and his wife move from the village soon to a foreign land where they discuss the recent happenings, during which the doctor confides to his wife about a secret. The doctor says that one of the compounder 'Waman' at the hospital told the doctor that the spirit is real for the people who have experienced it and not for them who haven't, and added more insight to Saibu's story. He told that, Saibu's widow Gulab was attempted to be molested by Kamath under the pretext of possession by Saibu's spirit soon after Saibu's death and he himself stopped the attempt as he coincidently went to the mansion to deliver some medicines to Gulab. Soon after Gulab disappeared from the village and nobody knows her whereabouts. Kamath also tried the same game of Saibu's possession to attempt molestation on a previous doctor's wife who was in the village before him and they left abruptly.

The doctor mentions to his wife that everyone involved had their selfish motives. Kamath might have been a latent schizophrenic who made an imaginary world of himself being Saibu and saw Gulab in every woman and his schizophrenia got activated as the doctor reprimanded him a couple of times for laxness in his work hurting his ego or he might be just a plain pervert taking advantage of the story and the villagers' belief.

Baijama wanted to maintain her importance in the village as the distant relative of Saibu and hence performed the rituals as a medium between the spirit and the superstitious villagers.

The doctor mentions that he acted as being possessed by the spirit as a psychological technique on that night to shock his wife into calmness but was not ready for her to go into a psychotic episode instead.

In the end, the situation is left ambiguous and to the audience interpretation of the movie as the scene cuts back to the village where Kamath watches a marriage procession on his way and sees Gulab instead of the newly wedded bride staring at her incessantly.

== Cast ==
- Adinath Kothare as Dr. Vinay
- Urmila Kanetkar as Madhura
- Bhargavi Chirmule as Gulab
- Vibhawari Deshpande as Baijama
- Makarand Anaspure as Sada Kamat
- Anushree Junnarkar as wife of first doctor
- Nayanaah Mukay as newly wedded bride
- Kishor Kadam as Sahebu
- Manjunath Gujar as Patient
- Subhash Khude as Inspecto
- Amit Koli as compounder

== Soundtrack ==
The film contained two songs, which are originally composed by Pt. Hridaynath Mangeshkar and have been cult classics amongst Marathi music lovers. For the film, both these songs are rearranged by Shankar–Ehsaan–Loy trio.

No.	Title	Singer(s)	Length
1	"Ye Re Ghana"	Vibhavari Apte Joshi	2:55
2	"Tarun Aahe Ratra Ajunahi"	Shankar Mahadevan & Sapna Pathak	3:41
