= Sudhir Pandey =

Indian film and television actor

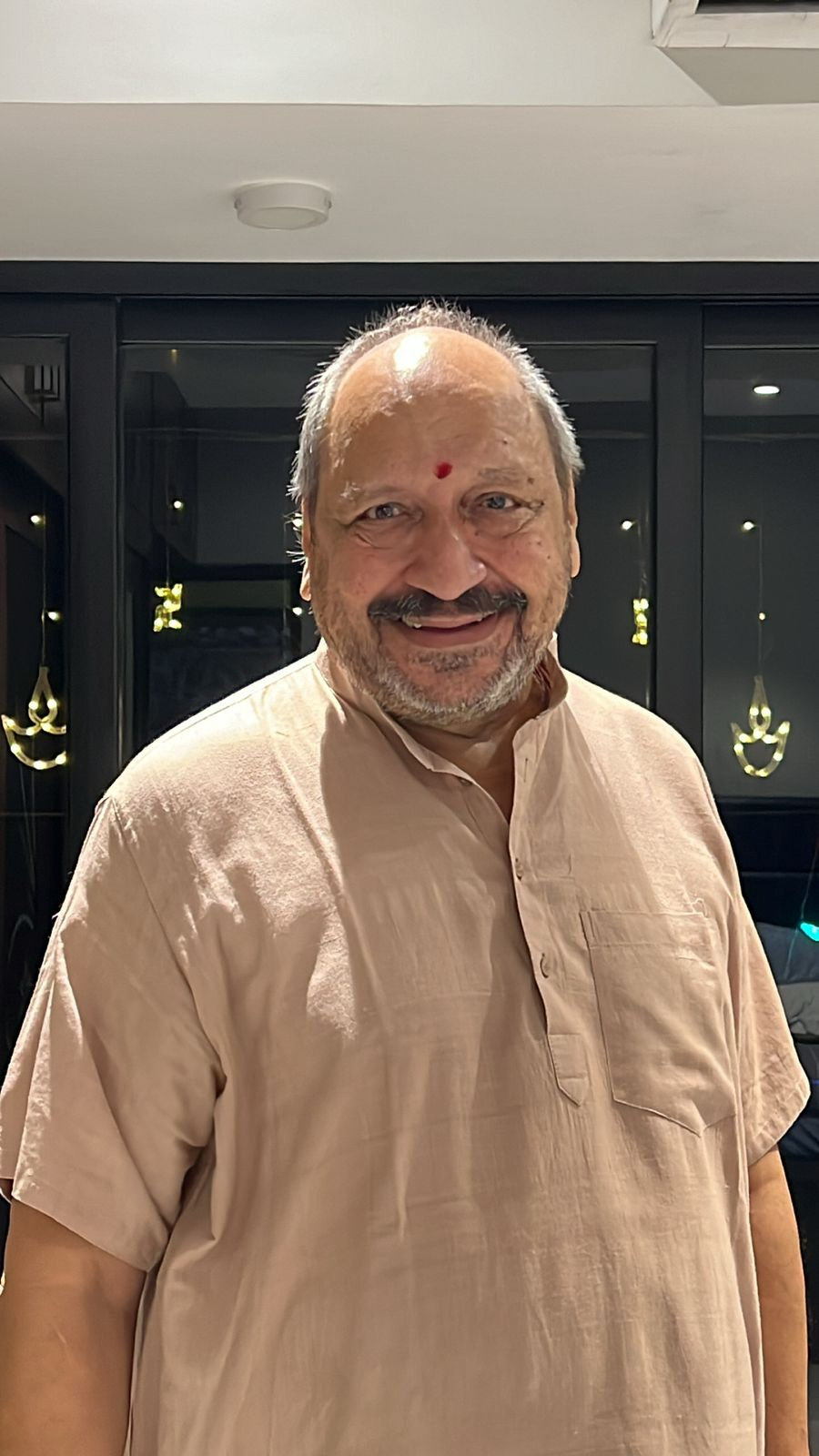
- Born: 22 December 1953; Kashipur, Uttar Pradesh, India (now in Uttarakhand, India)
- Occupation: Actor
- Years active: 1975–present
- Spouse: Rita Rani Kaul
- Children: 1

Sudhir Pandey is an Indian actor known for his work in Hindi-language films, television, and theatre. With a career spanning several decades, he has played a variety of supporting and character roles, often portraying fathers, uncles, or authority figures. He is a Film and Television Institute of India graduate. His father was famous Akashwani news reader Devki Nandan Pandey.

== Selected filmography ==
=== Films ===
- Shaan (1980) as Tiwari
- Chakra (1981) as Bhandari
- Dhuan (1981) as Inspector pandey
- Aagaman (1982)
- Do Dishayen (1982) as Swamiji
- Yeh Nazdeekiyan (1982) as Rajesh
- Shakti (1982) as manohar
- Kalka as Bacchu Singh
- Prerana (1984) as Birju
- Maati Maangey Khoon (1984) as Ram Singh
- Vivek (1985)
- Paththar (1985) as Hiralal
- Surkhiyaan (1985) as Mishra
- Pighalta Aasman (1985) as Lala Karan Singh Rathod
- Saagar (1985)
- Jhanjaar (1986) as Nagoji
- Mera Dharam (1986)
- Uprant (1987)
- Diljalaa (1987) as Shyam
- Mere Baad (1988) as Doctor
- Andha Yudh (1988) as Sampatrao Mahadik
- Waaris (1988) as Thanna Singh
- Sagar Sangam (1988) CID Inspector jaishanker
- Hum To Chale Pardes (1988) as Doctor
- Dayavan (1988) as Chhote Anna
- JailKhana (1989) – Dinu, Prisoner in Jail
- Salim Langde Pe Mat Ro (1989)
- Elaan-E-Jung (1989)
- Gola Barood (1989) – Insp. Mahender Nath
- Kala Bazaar (1989) – Mun. sutlpdt. Thakur
- Bhrashtachar (1989) – Phatte dada
- Main Azaad Hoon (1989) – Gulapchand (Prime minister)
- Jurrat (1989) – Police Inspector pandey
- Abu Kaliya (1990)
- Teri Talash Mein (1990) Police Inspector Dinesh
- Naag Nagin (1990) – Aguri
- College Girl (1990) Digvijay Singh
- Agneepath (1990) Police Inspector Pathan
- Awwal Number (1990) Sundaram
- Tum Mere Ho (1990) Thakur Chaudhary
- Amba (1990) Thakur Jasbir Singh
- Hatyarin (1991) as Shambhu
- Kasam Kali Ki (1991) as Daku Shaitan Singh
- Maut Ki Sazaa (1991) as Pandit Matadin
- Khoon Ka Karz (1991) Hariya
- Benaam Badsha (1991) as Abhinandan Tiwari
- Banjaran (1991) as Sardar Malik, Tribal Leader
- Dil Hi To Hai (1992) as Kamani
- Aakanksha (1993) as Thakur Mehtab Singh
- Khoon Ka Sindoor (1993)
- Sahibaan (1993) as Inder Guide
- Rakhwale (1994) as Din Dayal
- Paandav (1995) as Police Commissioner J.K.Srivastav
- Veergati (1995) as Police Commissioner
- Hahakaar (1996)
- Gehra Raaz (1996)
- Family of Thakurganj†
- Batti Gul Meter Chalu
- A Daughter's Tale Pankh
- Ajji
- Toilet: Ek Prem Katha as Pandit Vimalnath Sharma
- Ekkees Toppon Ki Salaami
- Issaq
- Dekh Tamasha Dekh
- Bombay Talkies
- Journey Bombay to Goa as Charandas
- Tees Maar Khan as Bunty Baweja
- Karzzzz (2008) – John
- Anwar
- Matrubhoomi
- Haasil
- Main Madhuri Dixit Banna Chahti Hoon
- Veergati
- Khooni Panja
- Dayavan
- Insan
- Jhanjhaar
- Saagar
- Yeh Nazdeekiyan
- Love You Loktantra
- Shakti
- Mission Raniganj (2023)
- Yaariyan 2
- Luv Ki Arrange Marriage (2024)
- Ginny Wedss Sunny 2 (2026)

=== Television ===
- Phir Bhi Dil Hai Hindustani
- The Sword of Tipu Sultan
- Maayka
- Sasural Genda Phool – Ambarnath Kashyap
- Balika Vadhu – Premkishore
- Dekho Magar Pyaar Se
- Hum Saath Aath Hain
- Yeh Shaadi Nahin Ho Sakti – Golcha
- Hum Sab Ek Hain (1999–2001) – Retd. Brigadier K. K (Kishan Kumar). Khachroo (after replacing Jatin Kanakia)
- Bombay Blue
- Kareena Kareena
- Tanha
- Mera Sasural
- Mahabharata
- Amanat – Lala Lahori Ram
- Gunwale Dulhania Le Jayenge
- Humko Tumse Ho Gaya Hai Pyaar Kya Kare
- Buniyaad – Lala Gaindamal
- Belan Wali Bahu – Rajnath Awasthi
- Ishaaron Ishaaron Mein – Om Shrivastava
- Zindagi Mere Ghar Aana – Shukhbeer Sakhuja
- Sasural Genda Phool 2 – Ambarnath Kashyap

Web Series

=== Theatre ===
- Bali Aur Shambhu (2017) as Shambhu
- Deewaar (2019) as Lalaji/Zamindar. The play is a remake of the classic play made by Prithviraj Kapoor by the same name in 1945.
- Welcome Zindagi (2023)
