= Mimi (2021 Hindi film) =

2021 Indian film by Laxman Utekar

- Official release poster
- Directed by: Laxman Utekar
- Written by: Laxman Utekar; Rohan Shankar
- Story by: Samruddhi Porey
- Based on: Mala Aai Vhhaychy! by Samruddhi Porey
- Produced by: Dinesh Vijan; Jio Studios
- Starring: Kriti Sanon; Pankaj Tripathi; Sai Tamhankar
- Cinematography: Akash Agarwal
- Edited by: Manish Pradhan
- Music by: A. R. Rahman
- Production companies: Jio Studios; Maddock Originals
- Distributed by: JioCinema; Netflix
- Release date: 30 July 2021
- Running time: 133 minutes
- Country: India
- Language: Hindi

Mimi is a 2021 Indian Hindi-language comedy drama film directed by Laxman Utekar and produced by Dinesh Vijan of Maddock Films. A remake of the 2011 Marathi film Mala Aai Vhhaychy!, it stars Kriti Sanon as the eponymous lead who opts to be a surrogate mother for a foreign couple. Pankaj Tripathi, Sai Tamhankar, Manoj Pahwa, Supriya Pathak, Evelyn Edwards, and Aidan Whytock appear in supporting roles.

Mimi was announced in August 2019. Filming was held in Rajasthan and Mumbai between October 2019 to January 2021, and was delayed due to the COVID-19 pandemic. The film score and soundtrack were composed by A. R. Rahman with lyrics written by Amitabh Bhattacharya. Following non-existent theatrical releases due to the pandemic, Mimi was planned for a digital release through the streaming services Netflix and JioCinema on 30 July 2021. However, it was released through the platforms on 26 July 2021, 4 days prior as the film was released accidentally by JioCinema and went into torrent sites.

At the 69th National Film Awards, Mimi won 2 awards – Best Actress (Sanon) and Best Supporting Actor (Tripathi). At the 67th Filmfare Awards, Mimi received 6 nominations, including Best Music Director (Rahman) and Best Female Playback Singer (Shreya Ghoshal for "Param Sundari"), and won 3 awards – Best Actress (Sanon), Best Supporting Actor (Tripathi) and Best Supporting Actress (Tamhankar).

== Plot ==
Mimi Rathore, a stage dancer in Rajasthan, is hoping to make it big as an actress in Bollywood. After a performance, a taxi driver named Bhanu approaches her with an offer. He introduces Mimi to an American couple, John and Summer, who are looking for a surrogate mother. Summer is unable to conceive, and the couple are willing to pay a surrogate a sum of ₹20 lakh (US$21,000). Mimi agrees, hoping this will help her with her film star aspirations.

The IVF procedure succeeds and Mimi becomes pregnant. Pretending to leave for an outdoor film shoot lasting nine months, Mimi goes into hiding at her friend Shama's place. Meanwhile, Bhanu is tasked by John and Summer to take care of Mimi during her pregnancy.

A few months later, Mimi's doctor informs John and Summer that the baby could be born with down syndrome. John and Summer are shocked, and abruptly change their mind about wanting a child. They ask Mimi to abort and return to the United States.

Mimi rejects the idea of abortion, and decides to carry the child to term. Returning to her parents, she concocts a story involving Bhanu as the father of the child, with whom she has eloped and married. Bhanu and Shama decide to also play along.

Mimi gives birth to a healthy boy with no signs of disability. She names him Raj, after a famous character's name in Bollywood films. Her family and townsfolk are perplexed by Raj's white skin, but he becomes a local wonder in the town. Mimi decides to give up her Bollywood aspirations to care for him.

Four years later, a video of Mimi dancing with Raj goes viral on the internet. Having come across the video, John and Summer decide to return to India and claim Raj. Mimi is furious at their abandonment, and refuses to give up Raj. John and Summer threaten Mimi with legal action, and she relents for Raj's sake so that he wouldn't have to be dragged to court.

Mimi and her family meet the couple to send Raj off, but are surprised to see John with another child, Tara. It is revealed that on the way back from Mimi's house, John and Summer came across an orphanage and felt a connection with Tara, a young girl who was crying from behind the orphanage gate. They decided to adopt her, explaining to Mimi that her affection for Raj made them realize that motherhood extended beyond genetic ties. They return to the U.S. with Tara, while Raj stayed back with Mimi and her family.

== Cast ==
- Kriti Sanon as Mimi Rathore, an aspiring actress from a small town who agrees to become a surrogate to pursue her dreams
- Pankaj Tripathi as Bhanu Pratap Pandey
- Sai Tamhankar as Shama Zafroon, Mimi's best friend
- Manoj Pahwa as Maan Singh Rathore
- Supriya Pathak as Shobha Rathore
- Evelyn Edwards as Summer Roger
- Aidan Whytock as John Roger
- Jacob Smith as Raj Rathore
- Jaya Bhattacharya as Dr. Asha Desai
- Atmaja Pandey as Rekha Pandey
- Nutan Surya as Kaikeyi Pandey
- Amardeep Jha as Mausi Amma
- Sheikh Ishaque Mohammad as Aatif Alam
- Pankaj Jha as Dilshad Ahmed
- Narottam Bain as Tailor Farookh Shaikh
- Gyan Prakash as Abdul Zafroon a.k.a. Maulwi Sahab
- Anil Bhagwat as Lawyer Ashok Bharadwaj
- Satkeer as Musical Guru
- Nadeem Khan as Jolly Singh

== Production ==
=== Development ===
In April 2019, The Times of India reported that Kriti Sanon will lead in a film that will revolve around surrogacy and Amar Kaushik was slated to direct, before being replaced by Utekar. Dinesh Vijan's production house Maddock Films was reported to back the project. The film was officially announced in August 2019 followed by a poster release and Sanon and Pankaj Tripathi were reported to feature in lead roles. It was further confirmed to be based on the Marathi film Mala Aai Vhhayachy (2011). In an interview with India Today, Dinesh Vijan stated that Mimi was a tale based on true events unlike poignant stories. For him, the film explores a beautiful relationship between a woman who never wanted to be a mother and one who can't wait to be one. The unexpected part was called "humor" in the storyline by him. Sanon added: "You will have a lot of humour and situational humour. At the same time, there are a lot of characters you will take back home." For Sanon, Mimi was the film which she signed hearing the idea but not the script. Later, realising that the role has a lot to offer to her as an actor. She gained fifteen kilograms of body weight to fit into the character of a pregnant woman. In an interview with Hindustan Times, she was quoted: "We had to shoot the pregnancy scenes and Laxman Sir was very clear that it was necessary to gain weight for those scenes because he didn't want the character to have a chiseled face". Actress Sai Tamhankar was roped into playing a pivotal character in the film, sharing screen with Tripathi. She was reported to play a Muslim woman from Rajasthan, hence learnt Urdu as well as the Rajasthani dialect for her role.

=== Filming ===
Principal photography commenced at Mandawa, Rajasthan by 29 October 2019. In an interview with Filmfare, Sanon confirmed it to be her first female centric film. By December 2019, the team had completed 40% of the film's production. The next filming schedule was planned from February 2020 for 30–40 days. Filming took place in Jaipur on 10 February 2020, where makers finished shooting major sequences within 4 March 2020. Reportedly, filming was stalled for a few days due to COVID-19 pandemic induced lockdown in India. In June 2020, Utekar confirmed that five days shoot was pending which included an introductory song featuring artists from United Kingdom. The song (later deciphered as "Param Sundari") was planned to be filmed by January 2021. He added that owing to the pandemic situations, big crew and cast traveling back to Rajasthan was not feasible. The international cast was called to Mumbai for the shoot as they were required for the continuity of the film. By May 2021, it was revealed that the entire shooting process has been completed.

== Soundtrack ==
The original score and soundtrack were composed by A. R. Rahman and featured lyrics written by Amitabh Bhattacharya. The soundtrack was released by Sony Music India on 16 July 2021, along with the song "Param Sundari" as the lead single.

== Release ==
Producer Dinesh Vijan had planned for a theatrical release in March 2021 after the release of his production Roohi, which was the first mainstream Hindi film to have a theatrical release post COVID-19 pandemic. However, following the nationwide lockdown due to a rise in COVID-19 cases and the second wave of the pandemic, the makers planned for a digital release in May 2021. The film was distributed worldwide by Netflix and JioCinema (the digital platform for Jio Studios, which co-produced the film) additionally distributed the film in India, with a scheduled release date of 30 July 2021. However, four days before the release, the platform JioCinema released the film earlier for a few minutes on 26 July 2021, resulting in online piracy as it was made available for torrent sites and illegal movie streaming platforms. To counter piracy, both Netflix and JioCinema premiered the film on the same date instead of 30 July.

== Reception ==
On the review aggregator website Rotten Tomatoes, 25% of 12 critics' reviews are positive, with an average rating of 5/10.

Renuka Vyahare of The Times of India gave 4 (out of 5) stars and said "Mimi picks a relevant topic and turns it into an engaging, empowering and compassionate tale on humanity and motherhood". Taran Adarsh, in his review for Bollywood Hungama, wrote "Mimi is a heartwarming saga, aimed at families and it will keep the audience thoroughly entertained. Had it released in cinemas, it had a good chance of becoming a success", giving a rating of 3.5 stars out of five. Sushri Sahu of Mashable India too gave 3.5 stars describing the film as a "feel-good family entertainer" and wrote, "Mimi is a family entertainer that might make you cry, laugh and smile all at the same time; If you're into that, you will enjoy Mimi, which is enriched by Sanon and Tripathi's performances". Calling Sanon's performance in Mimi her career-best, she further wrote, "Sanon has outdone herself. In fact, as you see her shoulder the film with her craft, you will also see her deliver her career-best performance; Mimi is Sanon's labour of love all the way".

Anupama Chopra of Film Companion wrote "Mimi is content to operate at a simplistic, superficial level. Laxman puts together a roster of terrific actors, but Mimi rests on Kriti's shoulders. She also works hard – putting on weight, working with a Rajasthani accent. In the climax, she is able to summon a wellspring of emotion but largely, her efforts are undermined by the script and her own inability to let go of synthetic Bollywood glamour." Jyoti Kanyal of India Today gave 2.5 (out of 5) and said "Mimi is a great attempt at bringing a social taboo like surrogacy to the center stage. However, in trying to make it more entertaining and emotional, the makers lost a good opportunity. The film has some really funny scenes, and if melodrama is something you don't mind, you should definitely give Mimi a watch". Anna M. M. Vetticad of Firstpost gave 1.5 (out of 5) saying "Writer-director Laxman Utekar's new Hindi film is a muddled take on motherhood with clarity only on its conservative mission to condemn abortion. If it had been better written and directed, Mimi might have been considered dangerous anti-women propaganda. To describe it thus would be a compliment though to the director's storytelling abilities".

== In popular culture ==
A romantic comedy film Param Sundari, inspired by a song of the same name from this film, starring Sidharth Malhotra and Janhvi Kapoor was released in 2025.

== Awards and nominations ==
Year	Award	Category	Recipient(s)	Result	Ref.
2022	22nd IIFA Awards	Best Actress	Kriti Sanon	Won	
2022	22nd IIFA Awards	Best Supporting Actress	Sai Tamhankar	Won	
2022	22nd IIFA Awards	Best Female Playback Singer	Shreya Ghoshal (for "Param Sundari")	Nominated	
2022	22nd IIFA Awards	Best Story	Laxman Utekar and Rohan Shankar	Nominated	
2022	Mirchi Music Awards	Female Vocalist of The Year	Shreya Ghoshal (for "Param Sundari")	Nominated	
2022	Mirchi Music Awards	Upcoming Female Vocalist of The Year	Khatija Rahman (for "Rock-A-Bye Baby")	Nominated	
2022	Mirchi Music Awards	Upcoming Female Vocalist of The Year	Rakshita Suresh (for "Yaane Yaane")	Nominated	
2022	Mirchi Music Awards	Best Song Producers (Programming & Arranging)	A. R. Rahman (for "Param Sundari")	Won	
2022	Mirchi Music Awards	Best Song Engineer – Recording & Mixing	Nakul Abhyankar and Suresh Permal (for "Param Sundari")	Nominated	
2022	67th Filmfare Awards	Best Actress	Kriti Sanon	Won	
2022	67th Filmfare Awards	Best Supporting Actor	Pankaj Tripathi	Won	
2022	67th Filmfare Awards	Best Supporting Actress	Sai Tamhankar	Won	
2022	67th Filmfare Awards	Best Music Director	A. R. Rahman	Nominated	
2022	67th Filmfare Awards	Best Female Playback Singer	Shreya Ghoshal (for "Param Sundari")	Nominated	
2022	67th Filmfare Awards	Best Choreography	Ganesh Acharya (for "Param Sundari")	Nominated	
2023	69th National Film Awards	Best Actress	Kriti Sanon (tied with Alia Bhatt for Gangubai Kathiawadi)	Won	
2023	69th National Film Awards	Best Supporting Actor	Pankaj Tripathi	Won	
