= Mera Sasural =

- Created by: Sacchitanand Productions
- Written by: Anjana Sood & Vicky Chandra
- Directed by: Rajesh Babbar
- Starring: see below
- Opening theme: "Mera Sasural" by Sangeeta Kopalkar
- Country of origin: India
- Original language: Hindi
- No. of episodes: 80

Production
- Editor: Rocchak Ahuja
- Running time: approximately 25 minutes

Original release
- Network: Sahara One
- Release: 10 March 2008

Mera Sasural is an Indian television drama series that aired on Sahara One channel in 2008. The story is of two young women, Heer and Goldie, in their in-laws' houses and brings alive the struggles of a woman in her attempt to strike a balance between the world that she is born into and the one that she enters the moment she is married.

== Cast ==
- Darshan Dave
- Ragini Shah
- Urmila Kanetkar
- Sudhir Pandey
- Vishal Puri
- Nitika Anand
- Juhi Patel
