= Lalbaugchi Rani =

- Directed by: Laxman Utekar
- Written by: Rohan Shankar
- Produced by: Boney Kapoor; Sunil Manchanda
- Starring: Veena Jamkar; Parth Bhalerao; Prathamesh Parab; Pratima Joshi; Ashok Shinde
- Cinematography: Lawrence D’Cunha
- Edited by: Dev Rao Jadhav
- Music by: Rohit Nagbhide
- Production company: Mad Entertainment
- Distributed by: Raksha Entertainment
- Release date: 3 June 2016
- Country: India
- Language: Marathi

Lalbaugchi Rani is a 2016 Indian Marathi language slice of life drama film, directed by Laxman Utekar and produced by Boney Kapoor and Sunil Manchanda under the Mad Entertainment banner. The film was released on 3 June 2016.

It stars Veena Jamkar in the lead role and Parth Bhalerao and Prathamesh Parab in supporting roles.

== Plot ==
Journey of a 24 year old mentally challenged girl who gets lost in Mumbai. During this unusual adventure, she meets various people from the society and manages to change their lives.

== Cast ==
- Veena Jamkar as Sandhya Parulekar
- Parth Bhalerao as Govinda
- Prathamesh Parab as Andy
- Ashok Shinde as Nitin Parulekar
- Neha Joshi as Sweety
- Nandita Patkar as Paaro
- Pratima Joshi as Mrs Parulekar
- Reshma Shinde
- Subrat Dutta as Drunk Guy
- Suyash Joshi as Sandhya Parulekar's brother
- Jaywant Wadkar
