= Maayka =

Indian drama television series

- Also known as: Maayka - Saath Zindagi Bhar Ka
- Written by: Mrinal Jha; Brij Mohan; Nikhilesh sharma (dialogues)
- Directed by: Ashwin Verma; Romesh Kalra; Sunand Baranwal; Santosh Bhatt; Niranjan Malhotra
- Starring: Neha Bamb; Vineet Raina; Vivan Bhatena; Kunal Karan Kapoor; Arti Singh; Shilpa Shinde; Kanchi Kaul; Urmila Kanitkar
- Music by: Abhijeet Hegdepatil
- Country of origin: India
- No. of seasons: 3
- No. of episodes: 570

Production
- Producer: Dheeraj Kumar
- Editor: Sameer Gandhi
- Running time: 22 minutes
- Production companies: Classic Productions (2007); Creative Eye Limited (2007-2009)

Original release
- Network: Zee TV
- Release: 15 January 2007 – 13 August 2009

Maayka - Saath Zindagi Bhar Ka is an Indian television series that was aired on Zee TV from 15 January 2007 until 13 August 2009. . The series was originally produced by Classic Productions, but was taken over by Dheeraj Kumar's, Creative Eye Limited due to high overhead costs and delays. Once taken over, Creative Eye replaced almost the entire cast of Maayka by ending their scene with a bomb explosion; the cast members filed a case against the channel with Cine and TV Artistes Association (CINTAA) for blacklisting them.

== Plot ==
The story concerns the Malhotra family's three daughters - Raji, Soni and Mahi and their younger brother Prince live in Jalandhar City of Punjab. Initially, the show focuses on the eldest daughter, Raji, who marries a police officer, Veer and tries hard to adjust to the lifestyle of his family. Mahi falls in love with Veer's brother Jeet but he actually loves Soni though he confuses the two sisters. Mahi is so heartbroken that she tries to commit suicide.

Veer and Jeet's mother Durga Khurana, calls Mr. Sareen (her sister's husband) to create problems for the Malhotra family. Mahi becomes a model and Sareen's son, Shabd falls in love with her, in order to save her family from Mr. Sareen, Mahi marries Shabd, then a bomb explodes at the Malhotras' house, killing Raji and most of her family. The only survivors are Soni and Mahi.

After their maayka (parental home) is destroyed, the girls struggle for survival, Soni, through a twist of fate, marries her sister's former husband, Veer, when Shabd finds out that Mahi is not as successful as he had thought, he feels cheated and begins to hate his new wife, Shabd's uncle and aunt help repair his marriage to Mahi. Mahi finds out that Shabd's sister, Kamya behaves oddly because she witnessed her father burn her mother alive because her mother had supported Kamya's love affair. Mahi exposes Mr. Sareen and takes care of a distraught Shabd.

Shabd realises Mahi's value, Jeet marries Cherry since he thinks Soni betrayed him, when Cherry discovers Soni and Jeet's past, she begins to plot killing Soni, Cherry's plan instead ends with Veer's death, Soni is left a pregnant widow. Later, Jeet and Soni marry, though Soni miscarries. Mohini (Soni and Mahi's mother) is found alive and she goes to live with Mahi at her house.

Misunderstandings arise between the two sisters when Mohini leaves Mahi's home without telling anyone and reaches Patiala to try to build a maayka for their daughters. Mahi gives birth to two daughters, giving one baby to Soni as Soni cannot conceive but after some time, under pressure from Shabd's family, she asks for her daughter back.

== Cast ==
- Urmila Kanitkar as Raji Malhotra Khurana – Mohini and Brij's eldest daughter; Soni, Mahi and Prince's sister; Veer's first wife (2007) (Dead)
- Neha Bamb as Mahi Malhotra Sareen – Mohini and Brij's youngest daughter; Raji, Soni and Prince's sister; Shabd's wife; Ipshita and Ishaani's mother (2007–2009)
- Arti Singh / Shilpa Shinde / Kanchi Kaul as Soni Malhotra Khurana – Mohini and Brij's second daughter; Raji, Mahi and Prince's sister; Veer's widow; Jeet's second wife; Ipshita's adoptive mother (2007) / (2007–2009) / (2009)
- Vineet Raina as Veer Khurana – Durga and Mr. Khurana's elder son; Jeet, Jyoti and Veena's brother; Raji's widower; Soni's first husband (2007–2008) (Dead)
- Vivan Bhatena as Shabd Sareen – Yashwant's son; Kamya's brother; Mahi's husband; Ipshita and Ishaani's father (2007–2009)
- Vikrant Rai / Romit Raj as Jeet Khurana – Durga and Mr. Khurana's younger son; Veer, Jyoti and Veena's brother; Cherry's ex-husband; Soni's second husband; Ipshita's adoptive father (2007) / (2007–2009)
- Sudhir Pandey as Brij Malhotra – Mohini's husband; Raji, Soni, Mahi and Prince's father (2007)
- Nandita Puri / Zarina Wahab as Mohini Malhotra – Brij's wife; Raji, Soni, Mahi and Prince's mother (2007) / (2007–2009)
- Pankaj Berry / Naresh Suri as Mr. Khurana – Lovely's brother; Durga's husband; Veer, Jeet, Jyoti and Veena's father (2007) / (2007–2009)
- Neelima Parandekar / Aruna Irani / Shoma Anand as Durga Khurana – Mr. Khurana's wife; Veer, Jeet, Jyoti and Veena's mother (2007–2009)
- Nisha Sareen as Kamya Sareen – Yashwant's daughter; Shabd's sister (2007-2009)
- Pawan Chopra as Yashwant Sareen – Shabd and Kamya's father (2007)
- Damini Anand as Charanjeet aka Cherry – Harry's niece; Jeet's ex-wife (2007-2009)
- Juhi Singh as Veena Khurana – Durga and Mr. Khurana's elder daughter; Veer, Jeet and Jyoti's sister; Simran's mother (2007) (Dead)
- Karuna Verma as Jyoti Khurana – Durga and Mr. Khurana's younger daughter; Veer, Jeet and Veena's sister; Parmeet's wife (2007-2009)
- Gurpreet Singh as Parmeet – Jyoti's husband (2008)
- Himanshu Sharma (vi) as Mr. Sareen – Yashwant's brother; Billo's husband (2007-2009)
- Jayati Bhatia as Billo Sareen – Mr. Sareen's wife (2007-2009)
- Upasana Singh as Lovely Khurana – Mr. Khurana's sister (2007-2009)
- Raju Kher as Harry – Cherry's uncle (2007-2008)
- Jasveer Kaur as Suhani – Shabd's ex-lover (2007-2008)
- Amrapali Dubey as Tina (2009)
- Parmeet Sethi as Prem Pujari Patiala Wala (2007)
- Shriya Bisht as Sapna (2008-2009)
- Indraneil Sengupta as Angad (2008-2009)
- Kunal Karan Kapoor as Sukhi (2009)
- Arun Bali as Daarji (2009)
- Micckie Dudaaney as Aditya Dhanraj (2009)
- Savita Bajaj as Bua (2008-2009)
- Janvi Chheda as Simran (2009)
