= Rohan Shankar =

Indian screenwriter

Rohan Shankar Ghuge
- Born: Mumbai, Maharashtra, India
- Spouse: Varsha Sharma
- Children: 1

Rohan Shankar is an Indian screenwriter who predominantly works in Hindi films.

== Career ==
Born in Mumbai, Maharashtra, India, Shankar was raised in Kalyan. He began his career in Marathi cinema, as writer for the film Lalbaughchi Rani, directed by Laxman Utekar.

== Filmography ==
Year	Title	Dialogues	Story	Screenplay	Notes	Ref
2016	Lalbaughchi Rani	Yes	Yes	Yes		
2019	Luka Chuppi	Yes	Yes	Yes		
2020	Suraj Pe Mangal Bhari	Yes	No	Yes	Also actor	
2021	Mimi	Yes	Yes	Yes		
2021	Helmet	Yes	No	Yes		
2025	Saiyaara	Yes	No	No		
2026	Bhooth Bangla	Yes	No	Yes	co-written screenplay with Priyadarshan, Abilash Nair	
2026	Haiwaan	Yes	No	Yes		

== Awards and nominations ==
Year	Award	Category	Film	Result	Ref
2022	International Indian Film Academy Awards	Best Story	Mimi	Nominated	
