= Baavare Prem He =

- Directed by: Ajay Kishor Naik
- Screenplay by: Chinmay Kelkar
- Produced by: Nilesh Singh; Nimesh Desai; Virendra Chavan
- Starring: Urmilla Kothare; Siddharth Chandekar; Ashwini Ekbote; Vidyadhar Joshi
- Cinematography: Saleel Sahastrabuddhe
- Edited by: Ashay Gatade
- Music by: Ajay Kishor Naik
- Release date: 26 September 2014
- Country: India
- Language: Marathi

Baavare Prem He (English: "Crazy Love") is a 2014 Indian Marathi language film directed and writer by Ajay Kishor Naik and produced by Nilesh Singh, Nimesh Desai and Virendra Chavan. The film stars Urmilla Kothare, Siddharth Chandekar and Vidyadhar Joshi. The film was released on 26 September 2014.

== Synopsis ==
Neil and Ananya are poles apart but, in spite of their differences, he falls in love with her while in Goa. He pursues her, hoping to get out of the friend zone.

== Cast ==
- Urmilla Kothare as Ananya Shirodkar
- Siddharth Chandekar as Neil Rajadhyaksha
- Vidyadhar Joshi as Gonsalves
- Supriya Vinod as Asmita Shirodkar
- Shantanu Gangane as Mohit Patil
- Ashwini Ekbote as Aarti Rajadhyaksha
- Madhav Abhyankar as Jayant Rajadhyaksha
- Tejashri Dharane as Sonali

== Soundtrack ==
Baavare Prem He

Soundtrack album by Ajay Kishor Naik
- Released: 2014
- Recorded: 2014
- Genre: Feature film soundtrack
- Length: 7:11
- Language: Marathi

Official audio
- Baavare Prem He – Full Album on YouTube

Track listing
No.	Title	lyrics(s)	Length
1.	"Barware Prem He"	Bela Shende, Hrishikesh Ranade	2:30
2.	"Baware Man Ase"	Shaan	2:51
3.	"Ek Coffee Othashi"	Shaan	2:30
Total length:			7:11

== Critical response ==
Baavare Prem He received mixed reviews from critics. Mihir Bhanage of The Times of India rated the film 2.5 out of 5 stars and wrote "Overall, the film, though predictable, hits the right chords and is sure to be a treat for love-story aficionados". Ganesh Matkari of Pune Mirror wrote "The film features some nice enough songs, competent performances, Goan locations, and makes for a decent two hours of viewing". A reviewer from Divya Marathi wrote "Along with weaving a beautiful love story, the director has succeeded in making the audience elated".

== Accolades ==
Awards and nominations for Baavare Prem He
Awards	Category	Nominee	Result	Ref(s)
DD Sahyadri Cine Awards 2015	Best Music Composer	Ajay Kishor Naik	Won	
