= Urmilla Kanetkar =

Indian actress

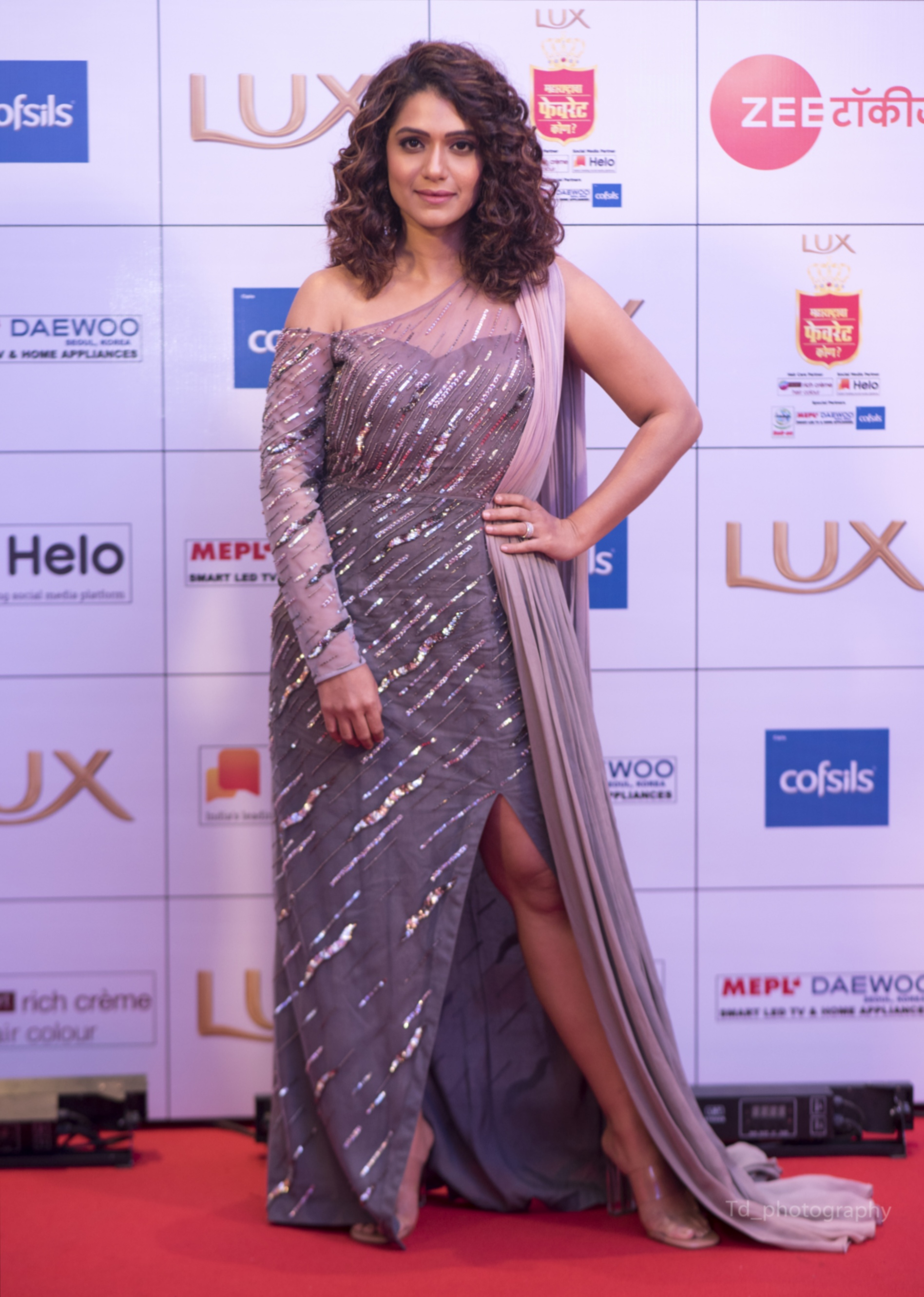
- Kanetkar in 2019
- Born: Urmilla Kanetkar; 4 May 1986 (age 40); Pune, Maharashtra, India
- Education: BA, MA in Kathak
- Alma mater: St. Xavier's College, Mumbai
- Occupations: Actress; dancer; producer
- Years active: 2003–present
- Spouse: Adinath Kothare (m. 2011; div. 2026)
- Children: 1
- Family: Kothare family

Urmilla Kanetkar (pronounced [ʊr.mɪ.l̪a kaː.neː.ʈkər]; born 4 May 1986) is an Indian actress and dancer who primarily works in Marathi films, television and theatre. She is known for her performances in both leading and supporting roles in mainstream productions.

Trained in Kathak and holding a Master's degree, she began her acting career with the Marathi daily soap Tuzyavina (2003–2004). She made her film debut with Shubha Mangal Saavadhan, followed by a few brief roles before appearing in the Hindi television shows Maayka (2007) and Mera Sasural (2008). She earned widespread acclaim in 2011 for her performances in Mala Aai Vhhaychy!, where she portrayed a surrogate mother, and Dubhang, in which she played a loving wife; the former earned her the Zee Chitra Gaurav Puraskar. She went on to appear in several commercial successes, including the romcom Duniyadari (2013), the love story Pyaar Vali Love Story (2014), and the romantic drama Ti Saddhya Kay Karte (2017)—all of which featured her in supporting roles. For Duniyadari, she received the MFK Award for Favourite Supporting Actress. In 2013, she reprised her Mala Aai Vhhaychy! role in its Telugu remake Welcome Obama.

Kanetkar earned critical acclaim for her leading roles in Anvatt (2014) as a conflicted wife, Baavare Prem He (2014) as a bibliophile, Kaakan (2015) as a wealthy young girl, and Karaar (2017) as an emotionally troubled, infertile woman. She made her web series debut in 2018 with the thriller Breathe, and later appeared in two well-received Marathi web shows, RaanBaazaar and Athang (both in 2022). That same year, she returned to television with Tuzech Mi Geet Gaat Aahe. Her recent film appearances include Ekda Kaay Zala (2022) and Autograph (2023).

Beyond her acting career, Kanetkar also runs a dance academy in Mumbai called NitryaAsha. She was married to actor-director Adinath Kothare, and the couple has a daughter.

== Early life ==
Urmila Kanetkar was born on 4 May 1986 into a Marathi family in Pune. She went on to train in Kathak from Asha Joglekar, who kindled her interest in dance at an early age and has a Master of Arts degree in it from the St. Xavier's College, Mumbai. In 1997, she participated in the program held for fiftieth Independence Day Celebrations for India. She has taken lessons in Bhubaneswar from Sujata Mahapatra for Odissi.

== Career ==
=== Early work and recognition (2003–2010) ===
Kanetkar began her acting career with the Marathi television series Tuzyavina (2003–2004) on Zee Marathi, where she appeared alongside Varsha Usgaonkar, Yatin Karyekar and Chinmay Mandlekar. In 2005, she played a brief role in Ankur, a drama directed by Pratima Kulkarni, which also aired on Zee Marathi. In 2006, she made her film debut as the lead in Mahesh Kothare's comedy-drama Shubha Mangal Saavadhan, starring alongside veteran actors Ashok Saraf and Reema Lagoo. She portrayed a young girl who falls in love with a man whose parents disapprove of her father's lifestyle, leading to complications in their married life. The film was a commercial success. The same year, she appeared in a supporting role in Rajendra Talak's critically acclaimed drama Savalee, and also portrayed the younger version of Lagoo's character in Sanjay Surkar's Aai Shappath..!.

In 2007, she returned to television and made her Hindi television debut with Classic Productions' Maayka, which aired on Zee TV. The show initially centered around her character, but her role was eventually written off following a reported fallout between the channel and the production house. Around the same time, she played the lead opposite Darshan Dave in Mera Sasural on Sahara One, a series that depicted a young Kashmiri girl's emotional journey as she adapted to her married life.

She became a household name when she replaced Manasi Salvi in Satish Rajwade's mystery drama Asambhav, opposite Umesh Kamat and Neelam Shirke. The series, based on the concept of reincarnation in Hindu culture, gained significant popularity and was later remade in Bengali and Kannada. Between 2009 and 2011, she appeared in the Marathi television series Gosht Eka Lagnachi and Vegh.

=== Breakthrough and acclaim (2011–2017) ===
Kanetkar received widespread acclaim for her performance in Samruoddhi Porey's drama film Mala Aai Vhhaychy!, in which she played a surrogate mother from the Vidarbha region of Maharashtra. The film, inspired by a real case encountered by Porey during her time as a practicing lawyer at the Bombay High Court, explored the growing phenomenon of surrogacy in India. A critical and commercial success, the film earned praise, Ulhas Shirke of Marathi Movie World wrote, “Kanetkar in the role of Yashoda, who impresses the most with her extraordinary acting skills. She had as many as four most difficult scenes, which only an experienced and matured actress would have done; but young Urmila performs with authority.” For her performance, she won the Zee Chitra Gaurav Puraskar for Best Actress and received a nomination for Maharashtracha Favourite Kon in the Favourite Actress category, as well as the film also won the National Film Award for Best Marathi Feature Film. In the same year, she was seen opposite Adinath Kothare for the first time in Mahesh Kothare's action drama Dubhang, which was notable for being the first Marathi film to utilize Dolby Digital 7.1 sound technology. Though the film received mixed reviews, the lead pairing was well received. Blessy Chettiar of DNA wrote, “The chemistry between the lead pair is the only saving grace of Dubhang,” while Namita Nivas of The Indian Express commented, “Urmila is good as the understanding wife who loves her husband immensely and trusts him blindly.” Her performance earned her a second nomination for the Zee Chitra Gaurav Puraskar. She also had a brief role in Viju Mane’s critically acclaimed drama Khel Mandala, based on a father-daughter relationship. Ulhas Shirke of Marathi Movie World mentioned, “Urmila plays the committed TV News channel Journalist very effectively.”

After a year-long gap, she returned to the screen in a supporting role in the coming-of-age romantic comedy Duniyadari (2013), directed by Sanjay Jadhav and based on the popular novel by late author Suhas Shirvalkar. She portrayed the daughter of a police inspector who is initially targeted by the protagonist, Shreyas, as part of a revenge plan, but eventually becomes his love interest. Upon release, the film received widespread critical acclaim and became a major box office success, running for 50 weeks in theatres and earning ₹32 crore (US$3.8 million) worldwide. It went on to become the highest-grossing Marathi film of its time and later achieved cult status in Marathi cinema. Kothare’s performance was appreciated by critics—Keyur Seta of Marathi Stars noted that “Kanitkar gives a cute as well as mature performance,” whereas Ulhas Shirke wrote, “Though Urmila Kanitkar Kothare finds a limited role, she plays an important character in the film, displaying her emotions clearly.” Kothare won the Maharashtracha Favourite Kon Award for Favourite Supporting Actress for her performance. Next, she made her Telugu film debut in Welcome Obama, the official remake of Mala Aai Vhhaychy!, where she reprised her role of Yashoda from the original. The film received mixed reviews, though Kothare’s performance was singled out for praise. A critic from The Times of India commented, “The acting is all over the top save Urmila, who stands out with a believable portrayal of a village woman.”

In 2014, she had six releases, beginning with Ravi Jadhav’s romantic drama Timepass, in which she appeared in a supporting role. Next, she starred opposite Adinath in Gajendra Ahire’s psychological thriller Anvatt, marking their final on-screen collaboration. The duo portrayed a married couple who relocate to a remote village to honor the last wish of Vinay’s late grandfather. Their on-screen kissing scene also generated significant buzz and became a talking point upon the film’s release. The Times of India noted, “Urmila, who looks every bit the hassled wife torn between her faith in her husband and the fear of the unknown.” The film received critical acclaim, with both actors earning praise for their performances. She was also seen as a Lavani dancer in Laxman Utekar’s critically acclaimed drama Tapaal, adding another memorable character to her diverse portfolio. Additionally, she starred opposite Siddharth Chandekar in the romantic drama Baavare Prem He, where her performance received praise from Mihir Bhanage of The Times of India, who observed, “Urmila’s expressive eyes do half the work for her portrayal and the rest she does through her acting.” Her final release of the year was Jadhav’s Pyaar Vali Love Story, where she appeared alongside Swapnil Joshi and Sai Tamhankar. In the film, she played the outspoken yet endearing Nandini, a role that received considerable praise. Mihir Bhanage of The Times of India remarked, “It is Urmila’s foul-mouthed yet lovable and sensible Nandini that steals the show,” and Ulhas Shirke described her as the “scene-stealer” in the film’s first half.

In 2015, she played the role of a wealthy young woman who falls in love with a dedicated but economically disadvantaged man in the period romantic drama Kaakan, directed by actress Kranti Redkar in her directorial debut; however, their love remains unfulfilled due to class differences. The film was met with critical and audience acclaim. Mihir Bhanage of The Times of India stated, “Urmila, as always, does most of the work through her expressive eyes. She is the perfect person for the role; bubbly, childish yet caring and sensitive." Saumitra Pote of Maharashtra Times also appreciated the on-screen chemistry, noting, “The way they express each other through their eyes alone is amazing.” In the same year, she also appeared in brief roles in Timepass 2, the sequel to Timepass, and the dark comedy Welcome Zindagi. For the latter, critic Keyur Seta of Marathi Stars remarked, “Kothare scores high in a difficult cameo.”

The following year, she had only one release in the romantic action film Guru, opposite Ankush Chaudhari, marking her third collaboration with director Sanjay Jadhav. Mihir Bhanage of The Times of India noted, “In a film that is entirely Ankush’s, Urmila holds fort and prevents herself from being just the glam-quotient of the film by making the most of her role.” The film had an average run at the box office.

She had two major releases in 2017, the first being Satish Rajwade’s romantic drama Ti Saddhya Kay Karte, in which she portrayed the wife of Anurag, played by Chaudhari. The film emerged as one of the most successful Marathi films of the year, earning ₹22.54 crore (US$2.3 million) worldwide. She once again worked in a film based on the concept of surrogacy, but this time portrayed a woman seeking a surrogate mother in the drama Karaar, alongside Subodh Bhave and Kranti Redkar. The film received mixed reviews, but the lead performances were appreciated, Ganesh Matkari of Pune Mirror wrote, "Out of the three main characters, Jayashree has the maximum screen time but the least impact, due to no fault of Urmila, who plays the part. The other two are stronger characters and represent two sides of the conflict." Around the same time, she also played the title role in Vitha, a biographical film based on legendary tamasha dancer Vithabai Narayangaonkar, portraying her dedication, love, and struggle for the stage; however, the film remains unreleased.

=== Career fluctuation and television comeback (2018–present) ===
In 2018, she appeared opposite R. Madhavan in a small role as his wife in Amazon Prime Video’s crime thriller series Breathe. She was next seen in 2021 in the murder mystery SIX, where she portrayed a handicapped girl—one of the six suspects. The series premiered on Disney+ Hotstar as part of their Quix short-format series.

In 2022, she appeared across all three major platforms. Her first release of the year was Abhijit Panse's thriller-mystery series RaanBaazaar. One of the most anticipated shows of the year, it featured her in the role of an ambitious politician determined to rise to power by any means necessary—by hook or by crook. The same year, she once again reteamed with Planet Marathi OTT for the period horror series Athang. Both series received rave reviews and went on to become some of the most successful Marathi web shows. Her next release was the National Film Award-winning family drama Ekda Kaay Zala, directed by Saleel Kulkarni. The film revolves around a father who imparts life lessons to his son through stories and entertainment, with her playing a supportive wife and nurturing mother who often feels sidelined, yet harbors her own unspoken thoughts, desires, and emotional depth. While reviewers noted that her role was limited, they felt she did full justice to it. Jaideep Pathakji of Maharashtra Times commented, "Urmila plays her allotted role very honestly." ABP News critic Vinod Ghatge commented, “Kothare is as important as them both. She does the job of maintaining the balance of the film.” She was also nominated for the Zee Chitra Gaurav Puraskar for Best Supporting Actress. Apart from this, she played Sidharth Malhotra's sister, who is burdened by guilt from their childhood, in Indra Kumar's fantasy comedy Thank God, marking her first Hindi film project. Ganesh Aaglave of FirstPost stated, “Kothare wins our hearts with their superb act in limited screentime.” After twelve years, Kothare made her comeback on television with Star Pravah's Tuzech Mi Geet Gaat Aahe, a remake of the Bengali daily soap Potol Kumar Gaanwala (2017). She portrayed the love interest of a musician who chose music over their love, and who was pregnant during that time. The show was a superhit during its run.

She next reunited with Satish Rajwade in the romantic drama film Autograph, co-starring Chaudhari, Amruta Khanvilkar, and Manasi Moghe. Originally slated for a theatrical release in December 2022, the film instead premiered directly on the Star Pravah television channel in May 2023 for reasons unknown. Her performance earned her nominations for Best Supporting Actress at both the Fakt Marathi Cine Sanman and the Sanskruti Kaladarpan. She also made her Marathi stage debut with Filter Coffee, a play written and directed by Mahesh Manjrekar, in which she portrayed a painter who has lost interest in life after her husband's death but gradually falls in love with a charming and clever man.

== Personal life ==
Urmilla and Adinath Kothare first met in 2006 during the making of the Marathi film Shubha Mangal Saavdhaan, where he was working as an assistant director. In 2011, they both get married. In 2018, The couple welcoming their first baby daughter named Jija Kothare. On 16 July 2026, they announced their separation through a joint statement shared on social media after fifteen years of marriage.

== Other work ==
In 2016, Kanetkar started her classical dance academy named NitryaAsha in Mumbai.

== Filmography ==
=== Films ===
| Year | Movie | Role | Note |
|---|---|---|---|
| 2006 | Shubha Mangal Saavadhan | Supriya | |
| 2006 | Savalee | Radha | |
| 2006 | Aai Shappath..! | Devaki (Young) | |
| 2011 | Mala Aai Vhhaychy! | Yashodha | |
| 2011 | Khel Mandala | Anushka | |
| 2011 | Dubhang | Vishakha | |
| 2013 | Duniyadari | Meenakshi Inamdar | |
| 2013 | Thodi Khatti Thodi Hatti | Iravati | |
| 2013 | Ranbhoomi | | |
| 2013 | Welcome Obama | Yashodha | Telugu film |
| 2014 | Time Pass | Spruha | |
| 2014 | Baavare Prem He | Ananya | |
| 2014 | Anvatt | Madhura | |
| 2014 | Thenga | Sonia | |
| 2014 | Tapaal | | |
| 2014 | Pyaar Vali Love Story | Nandini | |
| 2015 | Kaakan | Sudhamati (Sudha) | |
| 2015 | Timepass 2 | Spruha | |
| 2015 | Welcome Zindagi | Manisha | Special appearance |
| 2016 | Guru | Mango Dolly | |
| 2017 | Ti Saddhya Kay Karte | Radhika | |
| 2017 | Vitha | Vithabai Narayangaonkar | Unreleased film |
| 2017 | Karaar | Jayashree Mokashi | |
| 2022 | Ekda Kaay Zala | Shruti | |
| 2022 | Thank God | Aayan's sister | Hindi film |
| 2023 | Autograph | Saavni | |
| 2026 | Maitreyaa | Herself | Special appearance in the song "Tujhe Naav Gheta" |

=== Web series ===
| Year | Serial | Platform | Role | Notes |
|---|---|---|---|---|
| 2018 | Breathe | Amazon Prime Video | Margaret Mascarenhes | |
| 2021 | Six | Disney+ Hotstar | | |
| 2022 | RaanBaazaar | Planet Marathi OTT | Nisha Jain | |
| 2022 | Athang | Planet Marathi OTT | Lakshmi | |
| 2024 | Zindaginama | SonyLIV | Akriti | Segment: "Purple Duniya" |

=== Television ===
| Year | Serial | Channel | Language | Role | Ref. |
|---|---|---|---|---|---|
| 2003-2004 | Tuzyavina | Zee Marathi | Marathi | Sanisa | |
| 2005 | Ankur | Zee Marathi | Marathi | | |
| 2007-2008 | Maayka | Zee TV | Hindi | Raji Khurana | |
| 2008 | Mera Sasural | Sahara One | Hindi | | |
| 2008-2009 | Asambhav | Zee Marathi | Marathi | Shubhra/Parvati | |
| 2009 | Gosht Eka Lagnachi | Star Pravah | Marathi | Anandi | |
| 2011 | Vegh | Saam TV | Marathi | | |
| 2021 | Sukh Mhanje Nakki Kay Asta! | Star Pravah | Marathi | Cameo appearance | |
| 2021 | Aai Mayecha Kavach | Colors Marathi | Marathi | As producer | |
| 2022–2024 | Tuzech Mi Geet Gaat Aahe | Star Pravah | Marathi | Vaidehi Kamat | |
| 2022 | Aata Hou De Dhingana | Star Pravah | Marathi | Contestant | |

=== Theatre ===
- Filter Coffee (2025) – Anita (Anu)

== Awards and nominations ==
| Year | Award | Category | Work | Result | Ref. |
|---|---|---|---|---|---|
| 2007 | Zee Marathi Utsav Natyancha Awards | Best Actress | Asambhav | Nominated | |
| 2008 | Zee Marathi Utsav Natyancha Awards | Best Actress | Asambhav | Nominated | |
| 2010 | Maharashtra State Film Awards | Best Special Actress | Mala Aai Vhhaychy! | Won | |
| 2011 | Zee Chitra Gaurav Puraskar | Best Actress | Mala Aai Vhhaychy! | Won | |
| 2011 | Maharashtracha Favourite Kon? | Favourite Actress | Mala Aai Vhhaychy! | Nominated | |
| 2011 | Maharashtracha Favourite Kon? | Popular Face of the Year | – | Nominated | |
| 2012 | Zee Chitra Gaurav Puraskar | Best Actress | Dubhang | Nominated | |
| 2013 | Maharashtracha Favourite Kon? | Favourite Supporting Actress | Duniyadari | Won | |
| 2021 | Maharashtracha Favourite Kon? | Favourite Supporting Actress | Duniyadari | Nominated | |
| 2023 | Zee Chitra Gaurav Puraskar | Best Supporting Actress | Ekda Kaay Zala | Nominated | |
| 2024 | Fakt Marathi Cine Sanman | Best Actress in a Supporting Role | Autograph | Nominated | |
| 2024 | Sanskruti Kaladarpan | Best Supporting Actress | Autograph | Nominated | |
