= Tapaal =

2014 Marathi-language film

- Directed by: Laxman Utekar
- Written by: Mangesh Hadawale
- Produced by: Varsha Madhusudan Satpalkar
- Starring: Nandu Madhav; Veena Jamkar; Urmilla Kothare; Milind Gunaji
- Cinematography: Laxman Utekar
- Edited by: K. D. Dilip
- Music by: Rohit Nagbhide
- Production company: Maitreya Mass Media
- Release date: 26 September 2014
- Country: India
- Language: Marathi

Tapaal is an Indian Marathi language film directed by Laxman Utekar and produced by Varsha Madhusudan Satpalkar. The film stars Nandu Madhav, Rohit Utekar, Veena Jamkar, Urmilla Kothare and Milind Gunaji. The film was released on 26 September 2014.

== Synopsis ==
Ranga, a young boy, writes a letter to his childhood girlfriend. Later, he realizes that the letter might go into the wrong hands and tries to get it back with the help of Devram, a postman.

== Cast ==
- Nandu Madhav as Devram
- Rohit Utekar as Ranga
- Veena Jamkar
- Urmilla Kothare
- Jaywant Wadkar
- Ganga Gogavle
- Milind Gunaji

== Production ==
Shooting began on 15 April 2013.

== Soundtrack ==
Tapaal

Soundtrack album by Rohit Nagbhide
- Released: 2014
- Recorded: 2014
- Genre: Feature film soundtrack
- Length: 4:37
- Language: Marathi

Official audio
- Tapaal – Full Album on YouTube

Track listing
No.	Title	Singer(s)	Length
1.	"Man Mohrun Aal"	Swapnil Bandodkar	4:37
Total length:			4:37

== Critical response ==
Tapaal received positive reviews from critics. Mihir Bhanage of The Times of India rated the film 4 out of 5 stars and wrote "Many of us still get nostalgic about handwritten letters but some of us might not have had the opportunity to write or read a postcard or inland letter. For the previous category, this is a chance to re-live the memories and for the latter, this is one tapaal that you surely don’t want to miss". Ganesh Matkari of Pune Mirror wrote "I wouldn’t go into other minor points. In fact, even in the present version, I’d still recommend the film. Other than songs, almost everything adds to the impact. Utekar’s framing is wondrous and the direction is seasoned". Sachin Fulpagare of Maharashtra Times rated the film 3 out of 5 stars and wrote "Overall, 'Tapaal' is a treat to watch. Teamwork is strong. With sincere efforts, Utekar has made his first work of art. It is not a problem to go to the theater and see it once". Divya Marathi wrote "This Tapaal is a must-see for a beautiful blend of human emotions. The content of this is not only to tear the veil of the present hypocritical, mean and hypocritical world, but it is also a reminder to preserve humanity as well as to be joyful".

== Accolades ==
Awards and nominations for Tapaal
Awards	Category	Nominee	Result	Ref(s)
Indian International Film Festival of South Africa	Best Actress	Veena Jamkar	Won	
