= Welcome Obama =

2013 film by Singeetam Srinivasa Rao

- Poster
- Directed by: Singeetham Srinivasa Rao
- Screenplay by: Singeetham Srinivasa Rao; Samruoddhi Porey
- Dialogues by: Rohini
- Based on: Mala Aai Vhhaychy! by Samruoddhi Porey
- Produced by: Bharati Krishna
- Starring: Urmila Kanetkar; Rachel; Esteban
- Cinematography: S. S. Darshan
- Edited by: Suriya
- Music by: Singeetam Srinivasa Rao
- Production company: Sandalwood Media
- Release date: 20 September 2013
- Running time: 120 minutes
- Country: India
- Language: Telugu

Welcome Obama is a 2013 Indian Telugu-language drama film directed by Singeetham Srinivasa Rao, who also composed the music. A remake of the Marathi film Mala Aai Vhhaychy! (2011), it stars Urmila Kanetkar, Rachel and Esteban. The film focuses on a surrogate mother who bears a foreigner's child. It was released on 20 September 2013.

== Plot ==
Lucy, an American woman, comes to India looking for a surrogate mother to bear her a child. She makes a deal with Yashodha, an impoverished single mother. Yashodha has an accidental fall when pregnant and the doctors conjecture that there is a risk of the baby being born deformed, leading to Lucy revoking the contract and returning to the United States. In time, Yashodha delivers a healthy and active boy named Krishna, and everyone calls him "Obama" due to his fair skin. Years later, Lucy gets to know about the boy and comes to India to take him with her. But Yashodha, having developed a strong bond with Krishna, refuses to send him back. How Lucy responds to this forms the rest of the story.

== Cast ==
- Urmila Kanetkar as Yashodha
- Rachel as Lucy
- Esteban as Krishna
- Sanjeev as Yashodha's brother
- Balabhadrapatruni Ramani
- Bhuvana Chandra
- Anantha Sriram

== Production ==
Welcome Obama, directed by Singeetham Srinivasa Rao and produced by Bharati Krishna under Sandalwood Media, is a remake of the Marathi film Mala Aai Vhhaychy! (2011). Urmila Kanetkar, the lead actress of that film, was chosen to reprise her role. British actress Rachel was chosen to portray an American woman, and French child actor Esteban was cast as the surrogate child. The dialogues were written by Rohini. Cinematography was handled by S. S. Darshan. Welcome Obama was shot on Eastmancolor film, as opposed to being shot digitally. Shooting was completed in 33 days.

== Soundtrack ==
The soundtrack was composed by Singeetham Srinivasa Rao, who also wrote the lyrics for all the songs.

Track listing
No.	Title	Singer(s)	Length
1.	"Oh God"	Karthik	4:40
2.	"Puttindi Palakadalilo"	Singeetham Srinivasa Rao, Nikhila Singeetam	4:28
3.	"Bujji Bujji Nadakalatho"	Chinmayi	4:54
4.	"I Am a Hero"	Pravasti	3:26
5.	"Aakasaanante"	Chinmayi	3:58
Total length:			21:26

== Release and reception ==
Welcome Obama was released on 20 September 2013. Sandeep Atreysa of Deccan Chronicle wrote, "Certainly, this is not a runof-the-mill story Telugu audiences would watch often. But what went wrong? Slow-paced narration in the first half and a bad comedy track in second half." Sangeetha Devi Dundoo of The Hindu wrote, "There was a time when Singeetam Srinivasa Rao gave us some of the most entertaining films that broke new grounds both in storytelling and technical departments [...] Now, at the age of 82, when the filmmaker with unbeatable fervour comes up with a story that discusses surrogacy, it is natural to expect a social family drama that tugs at your heart strings while making observations about surrogacy. But as the drama unfolds, you are left looking for the missing magic of a once-brilliant filmmaker."
