= Khooni Panja =

- Directed by: Vinod Talwar
- Written by: Salim Yusuf
- Screenplay by: S. Tahir
- Produced by: Vinod Talwar; S.K. Talwar; Achal Talwar
- Starring: Anil Dhawan; Jagdeep; Mac Mohan; Rita Bhaduri; Sudhir Pandey
- Cinematography: Manish
- Edited by: Tara S. Talwar
- Music by: Surinder Kohli
- Release date: 1991
- Running time: 130 mins
- Country: India
- Language: Hindi

Khooni Panja (transl. The Murderous Claw) is a 1991 Indian Hindi language horror film directed and produced by Vinod Talwar.

== Plot ==
Seema's husband, Ajit, has an affair with another woman, Usha. That night, Seema catches them red-handed (as revealed in the intro that she pretended to go to her mother's residence). Ajit and Usha kill Seema and bury her body secretly in a graveyard with the help of a gardener. Ajit's family included his mother, Ramaa, his sister, and Ajay, his younger brother. After a few days, they've decided on Ajay's alliance with Pinky Mehta, a young girl who also loves Ajay.

That night, a group of young girls plays volleyball near the graveyard. Suddenly, the ball lands in the yard. Pinky goes to get it. Seema's vengeful soul enters Pinky's body, possessing both her body and mind. One of her friends, also named Usha, tries to search for her and reach the gardener's house, but to no avail, after he replies that there is no girl of that name. She then reaches back to Pinky's parents, and both Pinky's father and friend find her lying unconscious. After getting home, Pinky is treated by the doctor. After getting up, she sees Usha keeping an eye on her. Her true form unleashes with white pupils, though it was Seema's soul who was thinking about Usha to kill her.

Ajay and Pinky visit the former's house, leading to the latter discovering that he is the brother of Ajit by the photo, though she doesn't react and is pretending to be normal in front of his mother. Ajit's mother also reveals that he was kicked out of the house due to his bad habits. Pinky advises her to forgive them as he is her son, but she was adamant in her decision. Pinky convinces her to forget the past and live together as a part of a family, which was a part of her plan to kill the perpetrator. Usha disagrees after Ajit says to go back to his house, and the former is adamant in her decision.

One evening, when Pinky's parents go out for a relative's function, Pinky refuses to go and feigns her illness for some reason, so their servant, Babulal, is asked to keep an eye on Pinky. After they're gone, Pinky sets a trap for Babulal, while the latter starts getting drunk with clear intentions of molesting her. While Babulal tries to do so, he sees Pinky's ghastly form with white pupils and her mouth filled with blood, due to which he is frightened and runs away. Taking advantage of his drunken state, Pinky soon starts seducing him. After he is drunk again and tries to molest her for the second time, the ghastly apparition of Seema kills him. Pinky also witnesses this, but to no avail, as she is possessed again. The police arrive at the scene and find out that Pinky is the sole witness to the crime, and an officer also asks her a few questions, but finds nothing and doubts her. Witnessing her behaviour, her father is concerned and doubts that her being possessed by a spirit, which is overheard by Pinky. Later on, she hunts the gardener down after showing her true form. The police arrive at the gardener's house and find Pinky's watch there, due to which she is accused of the murder again. Pinky intervenes and argues with her as the officer had gotten her watch as evidence, which disappears as he tries to take that out. And it is already worn by Pinky; her parents are worried about it again.

Usha arrives at her home and is welcomed by Pinky. The former asks her if nobody is in the house, while the latter is applying makeup. Suddenly, Pinky gets a bit pale due to her friend's locket, so she uses telekinesis and pours the red powder on her friend's hair, thus making her go for a shower, which will also lead to take off her locket. It is revealed that Pinky invited her only to kill her because of how close she was getting to her fiancé at a picnic, which even reminded her of Ajit's girlfriend, Usha. But when her friend tries to call Pinky, she is greeted by Seema's ghastly apparition, leading her to run away from it and find a guard of the booth who is actually drunk but tells her about the telephone booth nearby. She calls Ramaa, but the line is interrupted by the ghost, who also kills the guard. The ghost is after Usha, who starts the abandoned car and tries to escape, while the ghost is still after her. She opens the window of the front door (left) to escape from her and arrives in an abandoned ground, but the ghost kills her after ripping off her scalp.

Pinky's parents want to take her to an exorcist, but are stopped after she reveals her white-eyed form to her mother and threatens that if she tries to take her to an exorcist/calling him inside the house, or tells it to other people, she and her husband would be killed by her. Her mother asks about who she is and why she is doing all this. She answers that she is not Pinky, and Ajay is the only way to get to his house, so she and Ajay should get married in a short period of time.

Without knowing this, Ajay marries Pinky. While the evil spirit is going to take revenge against her in-laws' family, Ajay's mother calls an exorcist after reminding Ramaa's words that something inauspicious is going on ever since Pinky had entered their house, and even Seema's soul also reveals this and warns her not to call the exorcist, or she will die. Even after hearing Seema's side of the story, the exorcist does his job and tells Ajay not to stop while dumping the pot where the soul is kept under its control. While doing his task, he sees a woman getting molested, and when called out for help by the woman and he doesn't respond to her. But the efforts get foiled when he gets mocked by those thugs. Enraged, he keeps the pot aside, thus forgetting his task, and beats them. Seema's soul, after being freed due to the blunder and possessing Pinky back, kills the exorcist and takes the latter's disguise, thus killing Ajit's mother.

After knowing about his mother's death, Ajit then prepares to leave his residence with Usha. She calms him down by saying that it is good news, but beware, he doesn't understand her words. But she calms him down by explaining that half of his mother's property would be theirs now, and Ajay might be taking his family down to take it, which is why she warned him. Even though he was confident about the property what lengths he would go to redeem it. They go to their home and see that Pinky is standing, getting out of her room, and introducing herself sweetly. Ajit gets afraid and starts to ask how these mysterious deaths happen. Ajay replies to him about why he is asking these questions. Ajit starts blaming Pinky for all these deaths, but Ajay doesn't believe him and asks him how it can be. Ajit tells him that an evil spirit possessed her, but Ajay disagrees with his point, leading to an argument that Pinky is either innocent or guilty. But the argument stops when Usha calls Ajit to discuss whether to usurp her mother-in-law's property or mourn her mother-in-law's funeral. He tells her that he saw a glance of Seema in Pinky's body, but she doesn't believe it as they buried her. He tells her that he only buried her corpse, not her soul. He says that he is always victorious and sets a plan to demolish Seema's soul. Seema's soul escapes from Pinky's body and devises a plan to prove that Ajit is lying.

Ajit, along with Usha and Ajay, takes Pinky to another exorcist to check whether Ajit is lying or not. Though the exorcist doesn't believe him, he gives him an amulet to tie on Pinky's neck and tells him that no soul will possess the girl. Meanwhile, Usha feels blood drops falling on her forehead from the ceiling of her room; the blood drops also fall on one of the cushions on her bed. She then runs out of fear and calls, but nobody answers her call, and the phone line is moved by Seema's soul invisibly, experiencing endless fear and seeing Seema's apparition standing in front of her to kill her. She asks as if she knows her or not, Usha then runs out of fear, but sees Seema's soul everywhere, every nook and corner, she sees the soul. Seema's soul threatens her to strip her on this road, exposing her shady past in front of the crowd who run away. The monstrous apparition starts stripping her, strangling her, and drowns her in a can of water.

Ajit and Ajay arrive at their home along with Pinky, who is angry with Ajay for obeying her brother's orders to take her to an exorcist and insult her. Ajay then takes out the amulet from her neck and also takes out his locket for her sake, and they both have a physical relationship with themselves. Ajit arrives home but gets attacked by the monstrous apparition, but manages to escape and starts his jeep, and rides it towards the jungle where he buried her. Ajay and Pinky also go behind Ajit to check whether he's alright. But Seema's soul also appears in front of his jeep, he takes out his revolver and starts firing at her, but to no avail. He then runs his jeep backward, but Seema's soul also takes a turn behind him, blocking the way for him. He then starts the jeep and goes to the front, but Seema's monstrous apparition appears again while chasing him. He stops the jeep, due to which the monstrosity falls. He tries to run over the jeep onto the monstrosity, where he succeeds a little, but it seems short-lived, and she appears on his jeep again to kill him. He rotates the jeep continuously until reaching the graveyard where she was buried. She then starts to attack all his remaining family members, including Ajay and Pinky. But Ajay then runs over the jeep on the monstrous apparition of Seema, whose hand splits off her body to pull Ajit and bury him automatically with God's powers. Ajay takes the sword and stabs it over the burial ground of Ajit.

The film ends with Ajay and Pinky living happily ever after.

== Cast ==
- Javed Khan as Ajay
- Sargam as Pinky
- Anil Dhawan as Pinky's father
- Beena Banerjee as Pinky's mother
- Jagdeep as Murlimanohar
- Mac Mohan as servant Babulal
- Rita Bhaduri as Ajit and Ajay's mother
- Sudhir Pandey as gardener
- Ajit Vachani as Ajit
- Tiku Talsania as Tiku
- Sandhu Raj
- Seema Vaz as
  Seema
  Seema's soul
  Seema's monstrous apparition
- Tina Ghai
