= Mala Aai Vhhaychy! =

2011 Indian film by Samruoddhi Porey

- Poster
- Directed by: Samruoddhi Porey
- Written by: Samruoddhi Porey
- Produced by: Samruoddhi Porey
- Starring: Urmila Kanetkar
- Cinematography: Rahul Jadhav
- Edited by: Deven Murdeshwar
- Music by: Ashok Patki
- Release date: 11 February 2011
- Country: India
- Language: Marathi

Mala Aai Vhhaychay! (transl. I Want to Be a Mother!) is a 2011 Indian Marathi-language film produced and directed by Samruoddhi Porey. The story deals with rising surrogacy instances in India, where women are used as surrogates by foreigners. The film, starring Urmila Kanetkar, is an emotional drama telling the story of one such surrogate who bears a foreigner's child.

The film is critically acclaimed and won National Film Award for Best Feature Film in Marathi in 2011. It was remade in Telugu as Welcome Obama in 2013, in Malayalam as Lucky Star, and in Hindi as Mimi in 2021.

== Plot ==
Mary comes to India to look for a surrogate mother to bear her child. She finds a poor woman Yashoda who accepts the offer. Yashoda gets pregnant successfully. During her pregnancy, doctors inform Mary and Yashoda that due to some complications, the child would probably be born with disabilities. Mary decides to abandon the contract and leaves India though the pregnant Yashoda begs her not to leave. A few years later, Mary decides to return and look for her child.

The film shows the story from a legal and emotional perspective of whom the child should be with; his surrogate mother who gave birth to him and raised him or his biological mother who has a blood relation with him.

== Cast ==
- Urmila Kanetkar as Yashoda
- Stacy Bee as Mary
- Samruoddhi Porey as Nanda
- Aiden Barkley as Madhav
- Vivek Raut as Ganpath
- Sulbha Deshpande as Sindhu tai
- Akshay Deshpande
- Shreya Porey
- Suchitra Bandekar
- Matt Ridde
- Rupali Modak
- Atul Bhardwaj
- Sandip Rajput
- Ronit Malode
- Srushti Porey
- Shubhankar Raut
- Nakshatra Rajgire
- Sumit Ghom

== Production ==
The writer-director-producer of the film, Samruoddhi Porey is a practicing lawyer in Bombay High Court. The story of the film is based on one of the surrogacy cases she came across.

The film completed its shooting in the rural areas near Melghat-Chikhaldara of Amravati district in Maharashtra.

Aiden Barkley, who plays the role of a 4-year-old surrogate child hails from Washington, D.C.. He was selected for the role because of his blonde looks and was then tutored in Marathi, especially the Warhadi dialect. Aiden's father Matt also appears in the film. Matt and his spouse confirmed that Aiden himself was a surrogate child born in India and they were back in India to have their second surrogate child when Porey noticed Aiden and approached them for the role.

== Awards and recognition ==
The film won the National Film Award for Best Feature Film in Marathi. The film was also selected to be shown to President Obama by President Pratibha Patil.

== Soundtrack ==
The music of the film is composed by Ashok Patki on lyrics written by Samruoddhi Porey. Kunal Ganjawala and Vaishali Samant have sung the songs.
