= Sisodiya Rani Bagh =

Palace garden in India, Indiau

Coordinates: 26.8993°N 75.8586°E

Sisodia Rani Garden and Palace
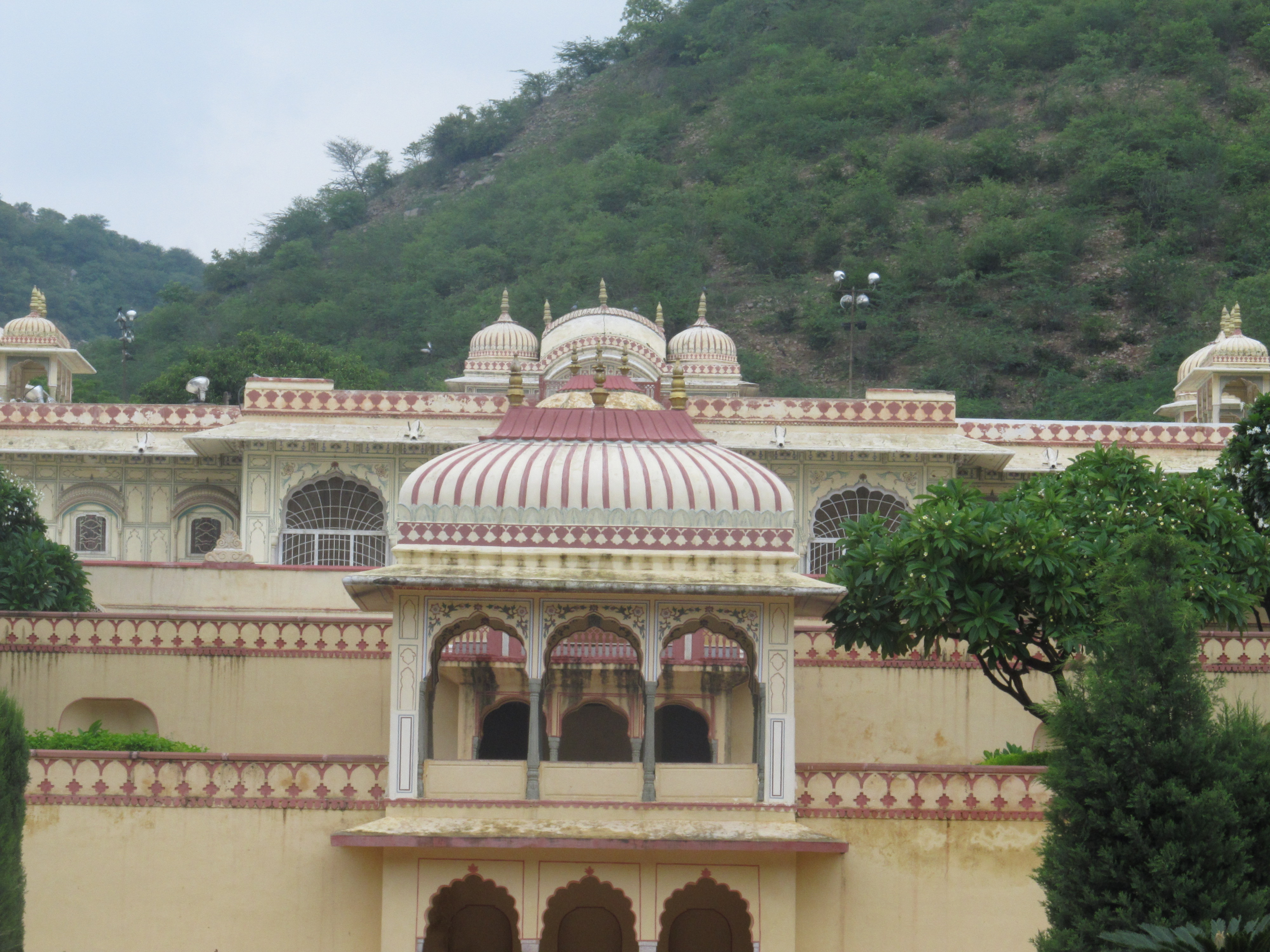
- Rani Sisodia garden overlooks hills
- Interactive map of the Sisodia Rani Garden and Palace area

General information
- Type: Palace garden
- Location: 6 kilometres (3.7 mi) from Jaipur city, Rajasthan, India, India
- Construction started: 1728
- Client: Maharaja Sawai Jai Singh II

Sisodia Rani Garden and Palace is a garden also known for its Rajput architecture garden 6 kilometres (3.7 mi) from Jaipur city in of Rajasthan state in India. It was built by Maharaja Sawai Jai Singh II as a gift of love for his 2nd queen in 1728 . The place consists of tiered multi-level gardens with fountains, watercourses and painted pavilions. A double-storeyed palace occupies the top terrace of the garden. The palace has many galleries, pavilions and murals depicting scenes from the life of lord Krishna. The palace lies on Jaipur Agara highway.

The palace garden derives its name, Sisodia Rani Garden and Palace, from the rani (queen) for whom it was built. She hailed from the Sisodia line of Suryavanshi (Sun dynasty) Rajputs, who ruled and now nominally rule the region of Mewar in Rajasthan.
